= Airi Furukawa =

Airi Furukawa 古川 愛李
- Also known as: Airin
- Born: 13 December 1989 (age 36)
- Origin: Aichi Prefecture, Japan
- Genre: J-pop
- Occupations: Idol; illustrator
- Years active: 2009 – present
- Label: AKS

Airi Furukawa (古川 愛李, Furukawa Airi; born 13 December 1989 in Aichi Prefecture) is an illustrator and former member of the Japanese idol girl group SKE48. She is a former member and leader of SKE48's Team KII.

== Career ==
Furukawa passed SKE48's 2nd generation auditions in March 2009. Her debut was in April 2009. Her first SKE48 Senbatsu was for the single "1! 2! 3! 4! Yoroshiku!".

In the 2012 general elections, Furukawa placed 30th with 11,179 votes. In 2013, she improved her rank to 27th with 24,990 votes.

In February 2014, during the AKB48 Group Shuffle, it was announced she would be appointed the leader of Team KII. In the 2014 general elections, her rank dropped to 37th with 19,315 votes. On February 1, 2015, Furukawa announced her graduation. She graduated on March 31, 2015. She now works as a freelance illustrator.

On April 20, 2016, she released a manga entitled Chibi Airin Would Like To Speak About..., featuring her character Chibi Airin.

On January 1, 2018, she announced via Twitter that she had gotten married and welcomed a baby last year in 2017.

== Discography ==
=== SKE48 singles ===
Year	No.	Title	Role	Notes
2010	2	"Aozora Kataomoi"	B-side	Sang on "Bungee Sengen"
2010	3	"Gomen ne, Summer"	B-side	Sang on "Hazumisaki"
2010	4	"1! 2! 3! 4! Yoroshiku!"	A-side	First A-side. Also sang on "Seishun wa Hazukashii" and "Soba ni Isasete"
2011	5	"Banzai Venus"	A-side	Also sang on "Ai no Kazu" as Team KII
2011	6	"Pareo wa Emerald"	A-side	Also sang on "Tsumiki no Jikan"
2011	7	"Oki Doki"	B-side	Sang on "Hatsukoi no Fumikiri" and "Hohoemi no Positive Thinking"
2012	8	"Kataomoi Finally"	A-side	Also sang on "Kyō made no Koto, Korekara no koto"
2012	9	"Aishite-love-ru!"	A-side	Also sang on "Halation"
2012	10	"Kiss datte Hidarikiki"	A-side	
2013	11	"Choco no Dorei"	A-side	Also sang on "Bike to Sidecar"
2013	12	"Utsukushii Inazuma"	A-side	Also sang on "Futari Dake no Parade" and "Seishun no Mizushibuki"
2013	13	"Sansei Kawaii!"	A-side	Also sang on "Michi wa Naze Tsuzuku no ka" as Aichi Toyota Senbatsu and "Zutto Zutto Saki no Kyou" as Selection 18.
2014	14	"Mirai to wa?"	A-side	Also sang on "Mayflower", "GALAXY of DREAMS" as the same-name-subgroup, "S-ko to Usohakkenki" as Team KII and "Bokura no Kizuna"
2014	15	"Bukiyō Taiyō"	A-side	Also sang on "Coming soon", "Tomodachi no Mama de" and "Sayonara Kinou no Jibun"
2014	16	"12 Gatsu no Kangaroo"	A-side	Also sang on "DA DA Machine Gun" and "Ai no Rule"
2015	17	"Coquettish Juutai Chu"	B-side	Sang on "Konya wa Join us!", "Boku wa Shitteiru" and "Sakura, Oboeteite Kure"

=== AKB48 singles ===
Year	No.	Title	Role	Notes
2012	27	"Gingham Check"	B-side	Ranked 30th in 2012 General Election. Sang on "Nante Bohemian"
2012	29	"Eien Pressure"	B-side	Sang on "Tsuyogari Tokei"
2013	32	"Koi Suru Fortune Cookie"	B-side	Ranked 27th in 2013 General Election. Sang on "Ai no Imi wo Kangaete mita"
2013	34	"Suzukake no Ki no Michi de "Kimi no Hohoemi o Yume ni Miru" to Itte Shimattara Bokutachi no Kankei wa Dō Kawatte Shimau no ka, Bokunari ni Nan-nichi ka Kangaeta Ue de no Yaya Kihazukashii Ketsuron no Yō na Mono"	B-side	Sang on "Escape"
2014	35	"Mae Shika Mukanee"	B-side	Sang on "KONJO"
2014	37	"Kokoro no Placard"	B-side	Ranked 37th in 2014 General Election. Sang on "Hito Natsu no Hankouki"
2014	38	"Kibouteki Refrain"	B-side	Sang on "Utaitai"
2015	39	"Green Flash"	B-side	Sang on "Sekai ga Naiteru Nara"

== Appearances ==
=== Stage units ===
SKE48 KII 1st Stage "Aitakatta" (会いたかった)

1. "Namida no Shounan" (涙の湘南)"
2. "Koi no PLAN" (恋のPLAN)"
3. "Senaka Kara Dakishimete" (背中から抱きしめて)"
4. "Rio no Kakumei" (リオの革命)"

SKE48 Team KII 2nd Stage "Te wo Tsuginagara" (手をつなぎながら)

1. "Ame no Pianist" (雨のピアニスト)

SKE48 Team KII 3rd Stage "Ramune no Nomikata" (ラムネの飲み方)

1. "Manazashi, Sayonara" (眼差しサヨナラ)

SKE48 Team KII 4th Stage "Theater no Megami" (シアターの女神)

1. "Arashi no Yoru ni wa" (嵐の夜には)

SKE48 Team KII 3rd Stage "Ramune no Nomikata" (ラムネの飲み方) (Revival)

1. "Finland Miracle" (フィンランド・ミラクル)
