= Yuria Kizaki =

Japanese actress (born 1996)

Yuria Kizaki 木﨑 ゆりあ
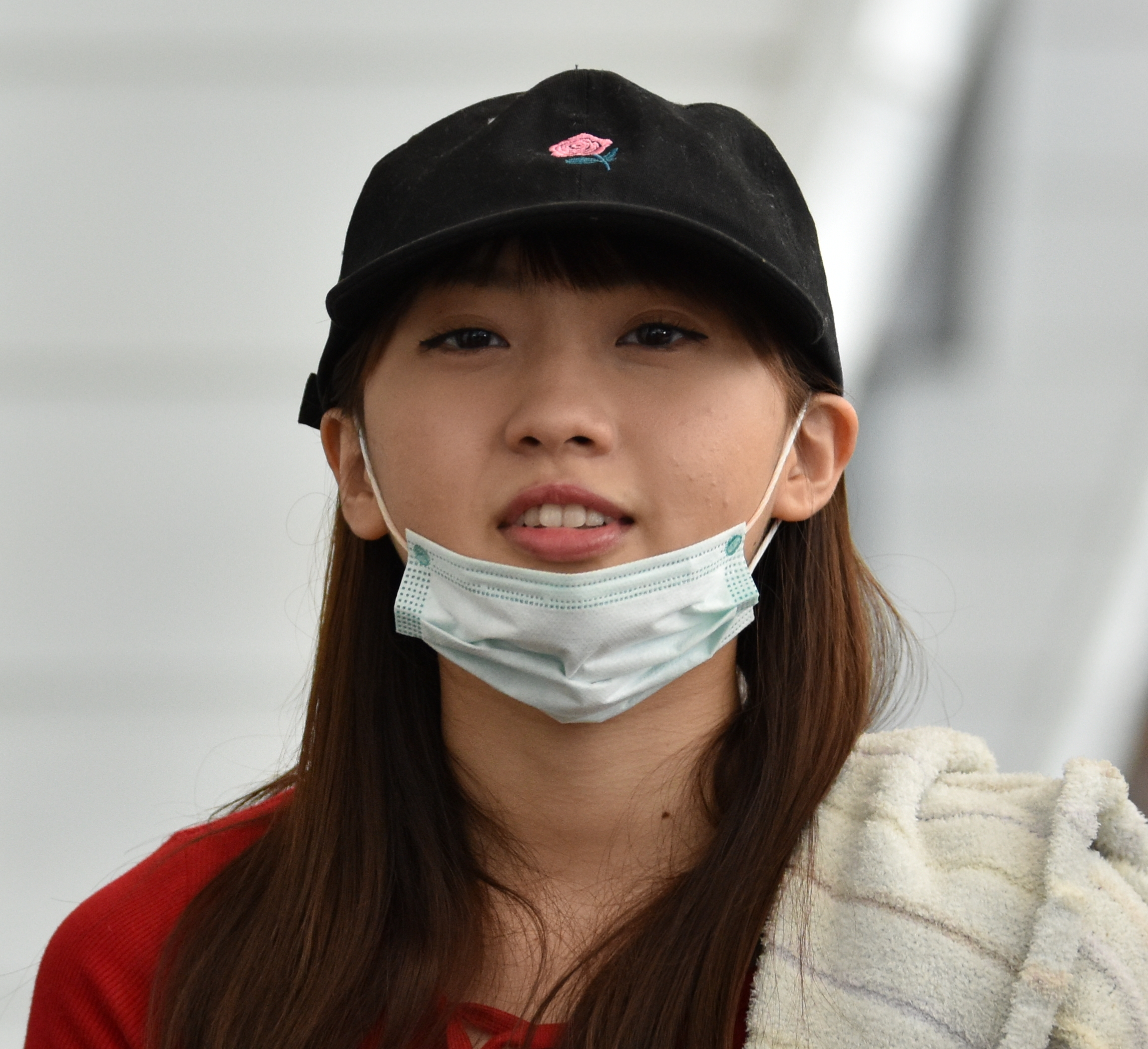

Background information
- Born: February 11, 1996 (age 30); Kasugai, Aichi, Japan
- Genre: J-pop
- Years active: 2007–present (as actress); 2009–2017 (as idol)

Yuria Kizaki (木﨑 ゆりあ, Kizaki Yuria; born February 11, 1996) is a Japanese actress and former member of the Japanese idol girl group AKB48, where she was the captain of Team B.

== Biography ==
Kizaki was born in Kasugai, Aichi.

On November 13, 2009, Kizaki passed SKE48's third-generation auditions. On June 23, 2010, she got promoted to an official member belonging to Team S. Gomen ne, Summer was the single where Kizaki was selected to sing the title track for the first time.

In the 2012 general elections, Kizaki placed 31st. In the 2013 general elections, her rank improved and she placed 22nd.

During AKB48's group shuffle on February 24, 2014, it was announced Kizaki would transfer to AKB48, Team 4. She debuted with AKB48 on April 24, 2014.

On April 12, 2017, Kizaki announced her graduation on AKB48 radio show All Night Nippon. She had her last handshake event on August 13, 2017, had her SKE48 graduation ceremony on September 28, 2017 and graduated from AKB48's Team B on September 30, 2017.

On October 23, 2021, Tristone Entertainment announced that Kizaki will go on hiatus from the entertainment industry due to physical and mental health issues.

== Discography ==
=== AKB48 ===
Year	No.	Title	Role	Notes
2010	18	"Beginner"	B-side (Undergirls)	Sang on "Boku Dake no value"
2012	25	"Give Me Five!"	B-side (Special Girls A)	Sang on "New Ship"
2012	26	"Manatsu no Sounds Good!"	A-side	
2012	27	"Gingham Check"	B-side (Undergirls)	Ranked 31st in the group's general elections, sang on "Nante Bohemian"
2012	28	"Uza"	B-side (Undergirls)	Sang on "Tsugi no Season"
2012	29	"Eien Pressure"	B-side (SKE48)	Sang on "Tsuyogari Tokei" as SKE48 representative
2013	30	"So Long!"	B-Side (Undergirls)	Sang on "Waiting Room"
2013	31	"Sayonara Crawl"	A-side	
2013	32	"Koi Suru Fortune Cookie"	B-side (Undergirls)	Sang on "Ai no Imi wo Kangaeta"
2013	33	"Heart Electric"	B-side (Undergirls)	Sang on "Kaisoku to Doutai Shiryoku"
2013	34	"Suzukake no Ki no Michi de "Kimi no Hohoemi o Yume ni Miru" to Itte Shimattara Bokutachi no Kankei wa Dō Kawatte Shimau no ka, Bokunari ni Nan-nichi ka Kangaeta Ue de no Yaya Kihazukashii Ketsuron no Yō na Mono"	B-side (SKE48)	Sang on "Escape" as SKE48 representative
2014	35	"Mae Shika Mukanee"	B-side (Smiling Lions)	Sang on "Kinou Yori Motto Suki"
2014	36	"Labrador Retriever"	A-side	Also sang on "Heart no Dasshutsu Game" as part of Team 4
2014	37	"Kokoro no Placard"	B-side (Undergirls)	Ranked 23rd in the group's general elections, sang on "Dareka ga Nugeta Ball"
2014	38	"Kibouteki Refrain"	A-side	Also sang on "Me o Aketa mama no First Kiss" as Team 4
2015	39	"Green Flash"	A-side	Also sang on "Majisuka Fight" and "Haru no Hikari Chikadzuita Natsu"
2015	40	"Bokutachi wa Tatakawanai"	A-Side	Also sang on "Kimi no Dai-ni shou"
2015	41	"Halloween Night"	B-side, Undergirls	Ranked 22nd in 2015 General Election. Also sang on "Sayonara Surfboard", "Ippome Ondo" and "Yankee Machine Gun".
2015	42	"Kuchibiru ni Be My Baby"	A-Side	Also sang on "365 Nichi no Kamihikōki" as Asa ga Kita Senbatsu, "Senaka Kotoba", and "Kin no Hane o Motsu Hito yo" as Team B which she is the center with Rena Kato.
2016	43	"Kimi wa Melody"	A-side	Marked as the 10th Anniversary Single. Also sang on "Lalala Message" as Next Generation Senbatsu and "Mazariau Mono" as NogizakaAKB.
2016	44	"Tsubasa wa Iranai"	A-side	Sang on "Koi o Suru to Baka o Miru" as Team B.
2016	45	"Love Trip / Shiawase wo Wakenasai"	B-side (Next Girls)	Also sang "Shinka Shitenee Jan" and "Black Flower".
2016	46	"High Tension"	A-side	Also sang "Happy End" as Renacchis.
2017	47	"Shoot Sign"	A-side	
2017	48	"Negaigoto no Mochigusare"	A-side	
2017	49	"#Sukinanda"	B-side	Last single to participate. Also sang "Give Up wa Shinai".

=== AKB48 Albums ===
- Koko ni Ita koto
  - Koko ni Ita koto
- 1830m
  - Itsuka Mita Umi no Soko
  - Yasashisa no Chizu
  - Aozora yo Sabishikunai ka?
- Tsugi no Ashiato
  - Boy Hunt no Houhou Oshiemasu
  - Ponkotsu Blues
- Koko ga Rhodes da, Koko de Tobe!
  - Koko ga Rhodes da, Koko de Tobe!
  - Namida wa ato Mawashi

=== SKE48 ===
Year	No.	Title	Role	Notes
2010	2	"Aozora Kataomoi"	B-side (Team B.L.T.)	Sang on "Bungee Sengen"
2010	3	"Gomen ne, Summer"	A-side	Kizaki's first A-side
2010	4	"1! 2! 3! 4! Yoroshiku!"	A-side	Also sang on "Seishun wa Hazukashii" as part of Akagumi and "Soba ni Isasete"
2011	5	"Banzai Venus"	A-side	
2011	6	"Pareo wa Emerald"	A-side	Also sang on "Hanabi wa Owaranai" (Selection 8) and "Tsumiki no Jikan"
2011	7	"Okey Dokey"	A-side	Also sang on "Hatsukoi no Fumikiri" and "Utaouyo, Bokutachi no Koka" (Selection 8)
2012	8	"Kataomoi Finally"	A-side	Also sang on "Kyo Made no Koto, Korekara no Koto" and "Kamoku na Tsuki" (Selection 8)
2012	9	"Aishite-love-ru!"	A-side	
2012	10	"Kiss datte Hidarikiki"	A-side	
2013	11	"Choco no Dorei"	A-side	Also sang on "Darkness" (Seven Dancers)
2013	12	"Utsukushii Inazuma"	A-side	Also sang on "Juri-Juri Baby" (Team S) and "Band o Yaro" (Magical Band)
2013	13	"Sansei Kawaii!"	A-side	Also sang on "Michi wa Naze Tsuzuku no ka?" (Aichi Toyota) and "Zutto Zutto Saki no Kyou" (Selection 18)
2014	14	"Mirai to wa?"	A-side	Kizaki's last single with SKE48. Also sang on "Galaxy of Dreams" and "Neko no Shippo ga Pin to Tatteru yo ni" (Team S).

=== SKE48 Albums ===
- Kono Hi no Chime o Wasurenai
  - Hula Hoop de Go! Go! Go!
  - Sunenagara, Ame...
  - Beginner

== Appearances ==
=== Stage units ===
==== AKB48 ====
Team 4 3rd Stage "Idol no Yoake" (アイドルの夜明け)

1. "Kuchi Utsushi no Chocolate" (口移しのチョコレート)

==== SKE48 ====
SKE48 Kenkyuusei Stage "PARTY ga Hajimaru yo" (PARTYが始まるよ)

1. "Skirt, Hirari" (スカート、ひらり)
2. "Hoshi no Ondo" (星の温度)

Team S 3rd Stage "Seifuku no Me" (制服の芽)

1. "Ookami to Pride" (狼とプライド)
2. "Mangekyou" (万華鏡)

Team S 4th Stage "Reset"

1. "Seifuku Resistance" (制服レジスタンス)

=== Variety ===
- Shūkan AKB (週刊AKB) (2009–2012)
- Shuukan AKB (2010–2012)
- AKBingo! (2010–2017)
- SKE48 Gakuen (2010–2014)
- AKB Nemōsu TV (AKBネ申テレビ) (2010–2016)
- Shitte Kaiketsu! SKE48 to Net (2010)
- SKE48 no Idol x Idol (2010)
- Star Hime Sagashi Tarou (2011)
- Itte♡Koi 48 (2011)
- Bananaman no Blog Deka (2011)
- SKE48 Musume ni Ikaga!? (2011)
- SKE48 no Sekai Seifuku Joshi (2011)
- SKE48 no Magical Radio (2011)
- SKE48 no Magical Radio 2 (2012)
- SKE48 no Magical Radio 3 (2013)
- Renai Sousenkyo (2014)

=== Dramas ===
- Strike Love (2010)
- Mousou Deka (2011)
- Asu no Hikari wo Tsukame 2 (2011)
- Majisuka Gakuen 3 (2012) – Peace
- Gyarubasara Gaiden (2012)
- GTO (2014)
- Majisuka Gakuen 4 (2015) – Magic
- Majisuka Gakuen 5 (2015) – Magic
- AKB Horror Night: Adrenaline's Night Ep.1 – Scissors (2015) – Kazumi
- AKB Love Night: Love Factory Ep.27 – Sudden Kiss (2016), Harumi
- Cabasuka Gakuen (2016–2017) – Magic (Gari)
- Tofu Pro-Wrestling (2017) – Yuria Kizaki/Papparā Kizaki
- Ossan's Love: In the Sky (2019) – Tamiyo Arisugawa

=== Movies ===
- Samurai Angel Wars (2011)
- Snow on the Blades (2014)
- Shimajirō to Ehon no Kuni ni (2016) Kicky (voice)
- Double Drive – Ryuu no Kizuna (ダブルドライブ 龍の絆) (2018)
- Grandpa! (2025)

=== Photobooks ===
- Peace (2015)
- Stagedoor (2017)

== Notes ==
- Her surname, Kizaki, uses the kanji 﨑 instead of 崎. Because of this, magazine publishers and fans misspelled her name as 木崎. The Japanese Wikipedia also uses the incorrect kanji due to the limitations of the JIS X 0208 standard.
