= Kaori Matsumura =

Japanese tarento (born 1990)

- 松村 香織
- Born: 17 January 1990 (age 36); Wakō, Saitama Prefecture, Japan
- Other name: Kaotan (かおたん)
- Occupation: Tarento
- Years active: 2009 – present
- Spouse: Unknown (m. 2020)
- Children: 2
- Musical career
- Genres: J-pop
- Instrument: Vocals
- Years active: 2009 – 2019
- Label: AKS
- Formerly of: SKE48 (2009 – 2019)

Kaori Matsumura (松村 香織, Matsumura Kaori; born 17 January 1990 in Wakō, Saitama Prefecture) is a Japanese tarento who is a former member of SKE48's Team KII.

== Career ==
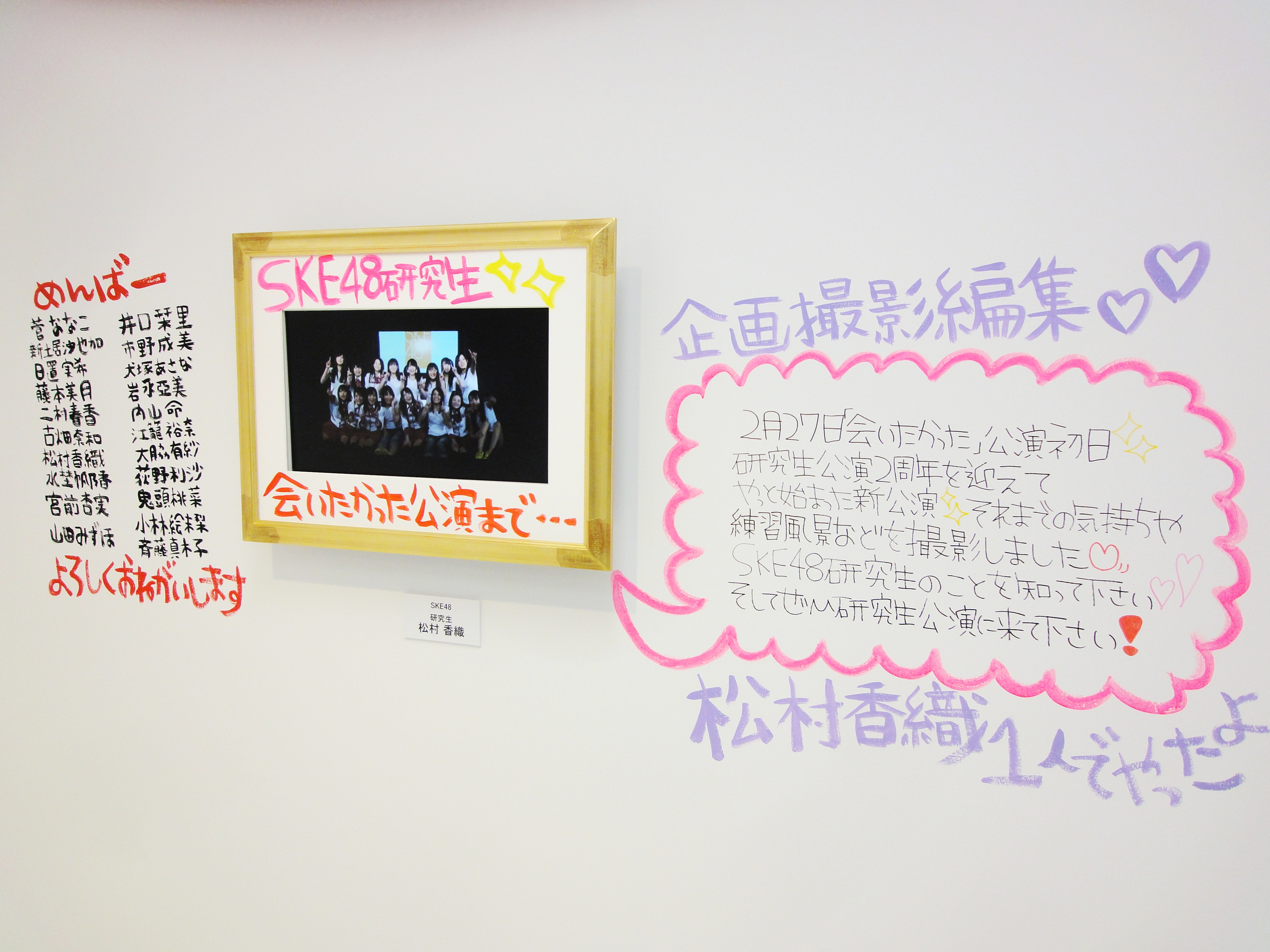
The video display exhibit used for the AKB48 Art Exhibition.

Mastumura applied for SKE48's 2nd generation auditions in March 2009 but failed to make the cut. She passed SKE48's 3rd generation auditions on 13 November 2009. During March 2012, Matsumura was included in the Google+ selection project where she would be involved for the first time with an AKB48 single ("Manatsu no Sounds Good!") for the B-side song "Gugutasu no Sora". The Google+ selection project was a promotion project involving 48 Group members selected by Yasushi Akimoto who had used Google+ to best portray their personality. Prior to this project Matsumura had gained some notoriety using Google+ by most notably regularly uploading a self-created video series titled "BBQ Matsumura Kaori no konyamo ichi komeda" (BBQ松村香織の今夜も1コメダ). The magazine Weekly Playboy first published a weekly serial about SKE48's members and activities for its 23 April release written by Matsumura. On 6 June 2012 the fourth AKB48 general election event was held at the Nippon Budokan indoor arena and was used to determine members who would partake in AKB48's 27th single (Gingham Check) via fan voting. Matsumura was able to obtain 9030 votes placing her 34th and able to participate in a B-side song for the group of members ranked 33rd to 48th collectively called "Next girls". The Next girls were also included in a promotion campaign which involved a television advertisement for the JOYSOUND karaoke brand name. Matsumura included as one of her submissions the only video display for an art exhibition held between 15 June to the 8th of July 2012 showcasing works from various 48 Group members. The video was a self made documentary involving the SKE48 trainees as they rehearsed for a new stage production.

In April 2013, she earned the title of Lifetime Honorary SKE48 Kenkyuusei since she decided to stay as a trainee member for the rest of her career in SKE48. In the 2013 general elections, she placed 24th. In October 2013, Matsumura released her first indie solo single, "Matsumurabu" (マツムラブ), which was produced by HKT48 member Rino Sashihara. The single's first press was only released in 1,000 copies, and Matsumura sold all 1,000 singles personally to fans.

On 24 February 2014, Matsumura received the title of AKB48 Group Kenkyuusei Student Council President (AKB48グループ研究生生徒会会長) at an event rearranging different members from AKB48, SKE48, NMB48, HKT48, and Nogizaka46 into different teams at a concert held at the Zepp DiverCity venue. In the 2014 general elections, she increased her rank and placed 17th. On 26 October 2014, she attended the Yamada town Seafood Tasting Festival (山田の幸 味わい祭り) in Iwate Prefecture where she was appointed the hometown ambassador in a ceremony.

Matsumura's second SKE48 Senbatsu was for the single Coquettish Jūtai Chū. Her previous senbatsu single was "Kiss Datte Hidarikiki".

On 18 September 2018, Matsumura announced that she would be leaving the group. On 5 February 2019, her graduation concert was held at Omiya Sonic City. She officially graduated from the group on 2 May 2019. She currently continues to work in the entertainment industry as a freelancer.

== Personal life ==
On 28 June 2020, Matsumura announced her marriage to a non-celebrity, though the wedding ceremony was not held until September 2022, due to delays brought upon by the COVID-19 pandemic.

On 3 April 2023, Matsumura announced her pregnancy of her first child. On 18 June, she gave birth to a daughter named Mikuri. Her second pregnancy was announced on 18 March 2025. Her second child, a son, was born on 28 July of that year.

== Discography ==
=== Solo singles ===
| Year | No. | Title | Notes |
|---|---|---|---|
| 2013 | 1 | "Matsumurabu" | First indie solo single |

=== SKE48 singles ===
| Year | No. | Title | Role | Notes |
|---|---|---|---|---|
| 2010 | 2 | "Aozora Kataomoi" | B-side | Sang on "Bungee Sengen" |
| 2010 | 3 | "Gomen ne, Summer" | B-side | Sang on "Pinocchio Gun" |
| 2010 | 4 | "1! 2! 3! 4! Yoroshiku!" | B-side | Sang on "Seishun wa Hazukashii" and "Soba ni Isasete" |
| 2011 | 6 | "Pareo wa Emerald" | B-side | Sang on "Tsumiki no Jikan" |
| 2011 | 7 | "Oki Doki" | B-side | Sang on "Hatsukoi no Fumikiri" |
| 2012 | 8 | "Kataomoi Finally" | B-side | Sang on "Kyō made no Koto, Korekara no koto" |
| 2012 | 9 | "Aishite-love-ru!" | B-side | Sang on "Aun no Kiss" |
| 2012 | 10 | "Kiss datte Hidarikiki" | A-side | First SKE48 A-side |
| 2013 | 11 | "Choco no Dorei" | B-side | Sang on "Fuyu no Kamome" |
| 2013 | 12 | "Utsukushii Inazuma" | B-side | Sang on "Seishun no Mizushibuki" |
| 2013 | 13 | "Sansei Kawaii!" | B-side | Sang on "Koko de Ippatsu" and "Zutto Zutto Saki no Kyo" |
| 2014 | 15 | "Bukiyō Taiyō" | B-side | Sang on "Coming Soon" and "Koi Yori mo Dream" |
| 2015 | 17 | "Coquettish Jūtai Chū" | A-side | Also sang on "Boku wa Shitteiru" |
| 2015 | 18 | "Mae Nomeri" | A-side | Also sang on "Shozo ga kono Boku wo Damenisuru" |
| 2016 | 19 | "Chicken Line" | B-side | Sang on "Kiss Position" and "Tabi no Tochū" |
| 2016 | 20 | "Kin no Ai, Gin no Ai" | B-side | Sang on "Ii Hito Ii Hito Sagi" |
| 2017 | 21 | "Igai ni Mango" | B-side | Sang on "En wo Egaku" |
| 2018 | 22 | "Muishiki no Iro" | B-side | Sang on "Because Docchitsukazu" |

=== AKB48 singles ===
| Year | No. | Title | Role | Notes |
|---|---|---|---|---|
| 2012 | 26 | "Manatsu no Sounds Good!" | B-side | Sang on "Gugutasu no Sora" |
| 2012 | 27 | "Gingham Check" | B-side | Ranked 34th in 2012 General Elections. Sang on "Doremifa Onchi" |
| 2013 | 32 | "Koi Suru Fortune Cookie" | B-side | Ranked 24th in 2013 General Elections. Sang on "Ai no Imi o Kangaete mita" |
| 2014 | 35 | "Mae Shika Mukanee" | B-side | Sang on "Konjo" |
| 2014 | 37 | "Kokoro no Placard" | B-side | Ranked 17th in 2014 General Elections. Sang on "Dareka ga Nageta Ball" |
| 2014 | 38 | "Kibouteki Refrain" | B-side | Sang on "Utaitai" |
| 2015 | 39 | "Green Flash" | B-side | Sang on "Yankee Rock" |
| 2015 | 41 | "Halloween Night" | A-side | Ranked 13th in 2015 General Elections. |
| 2017 | 49 | "#sukinanda" | B-side | Ranked 18th in 2017 General Elections. Sang on "Darashinai Aishikata" |
| 2018 | 53 | "Sentimental Train" | B-side | Ranked 17th in 2018 General Elections. Sang on "Sandal ja dekinai koi" |

== Appearances ==
=== Stage units ===
SKE48 Kenkyuusei Stage "Aitakatta" (会いたかった)

1. "Namida no Shonan" (涙の湘南)
2. "Koi no Plan" (恋のPLAN)
3. "Nagisa no Cherry" (渚のCHERRY)
4. "Rio no Kakumei" (リオの革命)

SKE48 Kenkyuusei Stage "Seifuku no Me" (制服の芽)

1. "Mangekyou" (万華鏡)

SKE48 Kenkyuusei Stage "Upcoming Stage Natsu" (アップカミング公演 〜夏〜)

1. "Matsumurabu" (マツムラブ)
2. "Wagamama na Nagareboshi" (わがままな流れ星)
3. "Hanabi wa Owaranai" (花火はおわらない)
4. "Kamoku na Tsuki" (寡黙な月)

=== TV variety ===
- SKE48 no Aichiteru (SKE48のあいちテル) (2011–2013)
- SKE48 no Sekai Seifuku Joshi (SKE48の世界征服女子) (2011-2012)
- AKB48 no Anta Dare? (AKB48のあんた、誰?) (2013)
- SKE48 no Sekai Seifuku Joshi Season 2 (SKE48の世界征服女子 season2) (2013-2014)
- SKE48 no Oyasumi Meigen Doujou (SKE48のおやすみ名言道場) (2013)
- SKE48 no Ebi Friday Night (SKE48のエビフライデーナイト) (2013)
- AKB48SHOW! (2013– )
- SKE48 Ebisho (SKE48 エビショー!) (2014)
- SKE48 Ebi Calcio (SKE48 エビカルチョ!) (2014-2015)

=== TV dramas ===
- Majisuka Gakuen 4 (マジすか学園4) (2015), Zakobosu

=== Musicals ===
- AKB49 Stage Play (2014)
