= Akari Suda =

Former musical artist

Akari Suda 須田 亜香里
- Also known as: Akarin
- Born: 31 October 1991 (age 34)
- Origin: Nagoya, Aichi Prefecture, Japan
- Genres: J-pop
- Occupation(s): Idol, singer
- Instrument: Vocals
- Years active: 2009 – 2022
- Labels: AKS
- Formerly of: SKE48

Akari Suda (須田 亜香里, Suda Akari; born 31 October 1991 in Aichi Prefecture) is a Japanese tarento and a former member of the Japanese idol girl group SKE48 represented by Twin Planet. She was a member of SKE48's Team E.

== Career ==
Suda passed SKE48's 3rd generation auditions on 11 November 2009, and debuted on 8 December 2009 at SKE48's Team S stage performance. On 27 February 2010, she was promoted to Team S. Her first SKE48 Senbatsu was for the single "1! 2! 3! 4! Yoroshiku!".

In the 2011 general elections, Suda placed 36th and entered Undergirls. In April 2013, she was transferred to Team KII. She started activities as a Team KII member in July 2013.

In the 2013 general elections, Suda entered senbatsu at 16th place. In February 2014, during the AKB48 Group Shuffle, it was announced Suda would be transferred to Team E. She climbed up the ranks to 10th place at the 2014 general elections.

== Discography ==
=== SKE48 singles ===
Year	No.	Title	Role	Notes
2010	2	"Aozora Kataomoi"	B-side	Sang on "Bungee Sengen"
2010	3	"Gomen ne, Summer"	B-side	Sang on "Shojo wa Manatsu ni Nani o Suru?"
2010	4	"1! 2! 3! 4! Yoroshiku!"	A-side	First SKE48 A-side. Also sang on "Seishun wa Hazukashii" and "Soba ni Isasete"
2011	5	"Banzai Venus"	A-side	
2011	6	"Pareo wa Emerald"	A-side	Also sang on "Tsumiki no Jikan"
2011	7	"Oki Doki"	A-side	Also sang on "Hatsukoi no Fumikiri"
2012	8	"Kataomoi Finally"	A-side	Also sang on "Kyō made no Koto, Korekara no koto"
2012	9	"Aishite-love-ru!"	A-side	
2012	10	"Kiss datte Hidarikiki"	A-side	
2013	11	"Choco no Dorei"	A-side	Also sang on "Bike to Sidecar"
2013	12	"Utsukushii Inazuma"	A-side	Also sang on "Futari dake no Parade" and "Seishun no Mizushibuki"
2013	13	"Sansei Kawaii!"	A-side	Also sang on "Koko de Ippatsu", "Michi wa Naze Tsuzuku no ka?" and "Zutto Zutto Saki no Kyou"
2014	14	"Mirai to wa?"	A-side	Also sang on "Mayflower", "Galaxy of Dreams" as the same-name-subgroup and "S-ko to Usohakkenki"
2014	15	"Bukiyō Taiyō"	A-side	Also sang on "Coming Soon", "Tomodachi no Mama de", "Banana Kakumei" and "Koi Yori mo Dream"
2014	16	"12 Gatsu no Kangaroo"	A-side	Also sang on "I love Aichi" as Aichi Toyota Senbatsu and "Seishun Curry Rice"
2015	17	"Coquettish Jūtai Chū"	A-side	Also sang on "Boku wa Shitteiru" and "Oto o Keshita Terebi"
2015	18	"Mae Nomeri"	A-side	Also sang on "Nagai Yume no Labyrinth"
2016	19	"Chicken Line"	A-side	Also sang on "Is That Your Secret?", "Bouenkyou no Nai Tenmondai" and "Tabi no Tochū"
2016	20	"Kin no Ai, Gin no Ai"	A-side	Also sang on "Happy Ranking"

=== AKB48 singles ===
Year	No.	Title	Role	Notes	
2011	22	"Flying Get"	B-side	Ranked 36th in 2011 General Elections. Sang on "Dakishimecha Ikenai" as Undergirls.	
2012	27	"Gingham Check"	B-side	Ranked 29th in 2012 General Elections. Sang on "Nante Bohemian"	
2012	29	"Eien Pressure"	B-side	Sang on "Tsuyogari Tokei"	
2013	30	"So Long!"	B-side	Sang on "Waiting Room"	
2013	32	"Koi Suru Fortune Cookie"	A-side	Ranked 16th in 2013 General Elections.	
2013	33	"Heart Electric"	B-side	Sang on "Kaisoku to Doutai Shiryoku"	
2013	34	"Suzukake no Ki no Michi de "Kimi no Hohoemi o Yume ni Miru" to Itte Shimattara Bokutachi no Kankei wa Dō Kawatte Shimau no ka, Bokunari ni Nan-nichi ka Kangaeta Ue de no Yaya Kihazukashii Ketsuron no Yō na Mono"	B-side	Sang on "Mosh & Dive" and "Escape"	
2014	35	"Mae Shika Mukanee"	A-side		
2014	36	"Labrador Retriever"	A-side	Also sang on "Kyo Made no Melody" and "B Garden"	
2014	37	"Kokoro no Placard"	A-side	Ranked 10th in 2014 General Elections.	
2014	38	"Kibouteki Refrain"	A-side		
2015	39	"Green Flash"	B-side	Sang on "Yankee Rock" and "Sekai ga Naiteru Nara"	
2015	40	"Bokutachi wa Tatakawanai"	A-side	Also sang on "Summer side".	
2015	41	"Halloween Night"	B-side	Ranked 18th in 2015 General Elections.	Sang on "Sayonara Surfboard"
2016	43	"Kimi wa Melody"	B-side	Sang on "Gonna Jump"	
2016	45	"Love Trip / Shiawase wo Wakenasai"	A-side		

== Appearances ==
=== Stage units ===
SKE48 Kenkyuusei Stage "Party ga Hajimaru yo" (PARTYが始まるよ)

1. "Skirt, Hirari" (スカート、ひらり)
2. "Hoshi no Ondo" (星の温度)

SKE48 Team S 3rd Stage "Seifuku no Me" (制服の芽)

1. "Onna no Ko no Dairokkan" (女の子の第六感)
2. "Mangekyou" (万華鏡)

SKE48 Team KII 4th Stage "Theater no Megami" (シアターの女神)

1. "Candy" (キャンディー)

SKE48 Team E 4th Stage "Te o Tsunaginagara" (手をつなぎながら)

1. "Ame no Pianist" (雨のピアニスト)

=== TV variety ===
- 'Shukan AKB' (週刊AKB) (2010-2012)
- AKBingo! (2010– )
- 'SKE48 no Idol x Idol' (SKE48のアイドル×アイドル) (2010)
- 'SKE48 no Sekai Seifuku Joshi' (SKE48の世界征服女子) (2011-2012)
- 'SKE48 no Magical Radio' (SKE48のマジカル・ラジオ) (2011)
- 'SKE48 no Magical Radio 2' (SKE48のマジカル・ラジオ2) (2012)
- 'AKB48 to XX' (AKBと××!) (2012)
- 'SKE48 no Ebi Friday Night' (SKE48のエビフライデーナイト) (2013)
- AKB Nemousu TV (AKBネ申テレビ) (2014– )
- 'SKE48 Ebisho' (SKE48 エビショー!) (2014)
- 'SKE48 Zero Position' (SKE48 ZERO POSITION 〜チームスパルタ!能力別アンダーバトル〜) (2014)
- 'SKE48 Ebi Calcio' (SKE48 エビカルチョ!) (2014-2015)

=== TV dramas ===
- Mousou Deka (モウソウ刑事!) (2011)
- Majisuka Gakuen 4 (マジすか学園4) (2015), Tsurishi
- Majisuka Gakuen 5 (マジすか学園5) (2015), Tsurishi
- AKB Horror Night: Adrenaline's Night (AKBホラーナイト アドレナリンの夜) Ep.2 - Soup (2015), Miki

=== Film ===
- Utahime Obaka Miiko (2020), Miiko Okaba
- The Hungry God (2025)

=== Anime ===
- Go! Go! Kaden Danshi (Go!Go!家電男子) (2015), 32 GB Ko

=== Musicals ===
- Musical AKB49 -Renai Kinshi Jourei- - Okabe Ai (2014), Urayama Minoru/Urakawa Minori (2016)
