= Kiss Datte Hidarikiki =

- Kiss Datte Hidarikiki Type A Regular Edition Cover

Single by SKE48
- Released: September 19, 2012 (Japan)
- Genre: J-pop
- Label: Avex Trax

SKE48 singles chronology
"Aishite-love-ru!" (2012)	"Kiss Datte Hidarikiki" (2012)	"Choco no Dorei" (2013)

"Kiss Datte Hidarikiki" (キスだって左利き) is the 10th single by SKE48. It was released on September 19, 2012. It debuted in number one on the weekly Oricon Singles Chart with 511,472 copies sold.

== Background ==
Kaori Matsumura and Nanako Suga were selected to sing the title track for the first time. This was Yuka Nakanishi return to senbatsu, her last selected senbatsu was for 1! 2! 3! 4! Yoroshiku!.

== Track listing ==
=== TYPE-A ===
CD
No.	Title	Artist(s)	Length
1.	"Kiss Datte Hidarikiki" (キスだって左利き)
2.	"Taiikukan de Choushoku wo" (体育館で朝食を)	Shirogumi
3.	"Kamigami no Ryouiki" (神々の領域)
4.	"Kiss Datte Hidarikiki (Off vocal)"
5.	"Taiikukan de Choushoku wo (Off vocal)"
6.	"Kamigami no Ryouiki (Off vocal)"

DVD
No.	Title	Length
1.	"Kiss Datte Hidarikiki (Music Video)"
2.	"Taiikukan de Choushoku wo (Music Video)"
3.	"Bonus Video "Gachi! Taidan -I-" special movie"

=== TYPE-B ===
CD
No.	Title	Artist(s)	Length
1.	"Kiss Datte Hidarikiki" (キスだって左利き)
2.	"Tori wa Aoi Sora no Hate wo Shiranai" (鳥は青い空の涯を知らない)	Akagumi
3.	"Kamigami no Ryouiki" (神々の領域)
4.	"Kiss Datte Hidarikiki (Off vocal)"
5.	"Tori wa Aoi Sora no Hate wo Shiranai (Off vocal)"
6.	"Kamigami no Ryouiki (Off vocal)"

DVD
No.	Title	Length
1.	"Kiss Datte Hidarikiki (Music Video)"
2.	"Taiikukan de Choushoku wo (Music Video)"
3.	"Bonus Video "Gachi! Taidan -II-" special movie"

=== TYPE-C ===
CD
No.	Title	Artist(s)	Length
1.	"Kiss Datte Hidarikiki" (キスだって左利き)
2.	"Atto Iu Ma no Shoujo" (あっという間の少女)	Kouen Ganbatta Gumi
3.	"Kamigami no Ryouiki" (神々の領域)
4.	"Kiss Datte Hidarikiki (Off vocal)"
5.	"Atto Iu Ma no Shoujo (Off vocal)"
6.	"Kamigami no Ryouiki (Off vocal)"

DVD
No.	Title	Length
1.	"Kiss Datte Hidarikiki (Music Video)"
2.	"Bonus Video "Gachi! Taidan -III-" special movie"

=== Theater Edition ===
CD
No.	Title	Artist(s)	Length
1.	"Kiss Datte Hidarikiki" (キスだって左利き)
2.	"Taiikukan de Choushoku wo" (体育館で朝食を)	Shirogumi
3.	"Tori wa Aoi Sora no Hate wo Shiranai" (鳥は青い空の涯を知らない)	Akagumi
4.	"SKE48 10th Single Medley"
5.	"Kiss Datte Hidarikiki (Off vocal)"
6.	"Taiikukan de Choushoku wo (Off vocal)"
7.	"Tori wa Aoi Sora no Hate wo Shiranai (Off vocal)"

== Members ==
=== Kiss Datte Hidarikiki ===
Team S: Masana Oya, Yuria Kizaki, Akari Suda, Yuka Nakanishi, Jurina Matsui, Rena Matsui, Kumi Yagami, Nanako Suga
Team KII: Shiori Ogiso, Akane Takayanagi, Sawako Hata, Airi Furukawa, Manatsu Mukaida, Miki Yakata
Team E: Kanon Kimoto
Kenkyuusei: Kaori Matsumura

=== Taiikukan de Choushoku wo ===
Team S: Mizuki Kuwabara, Kanako Hiramatsu
Team KII: Anna Ishida, Rina Matsumoto, Risako Goto, Riho Abiru, Mieko Sato, Tomoko Kato
Team E: Kyoka Isohara, Aya Shibata, Ami Kobayashi, Makiko Saito, Mikoto Uchiyama
Kenkyuusei: Tsugumi Iwanaga, Yuuna Ego, Sayaka Niidoi

=== Tori wa Aoi Sora no Hate wo Shiranai ===
Team S: Rumi Kato, Yukiko Kinoshita, Shiori Takada, Aki Deguchi, Momona Kito
Team KII: Seira Sato, Shiori Iguchi
Team E: Kasumi Ueno, Madoka Umemoto, Shiori Kaneko, Mai Takeuchi, Minami Hara, Yukari Yamashita, Nao Furuhata
Kenkyuusei: Mitsuki Fujimoto, Emiri Kobayashi

=== Atto Iu Ma no Shoujo ===
Team KII: Ririna Akaeda, Reika Yamada
Team E: Mei Sakai, Yumana Takagi, Rika Tsuzuki
Kenkyuusei: Narumi Ichino, Asana Inuzuka, Arisa Owaki, Risa Ogino, Miki Hioki, Haruka Futamura, Honoka Mizuno, Ami Miyamae, Mizuho Yamada

=== Kamigami no Ryouiki ===
Team S: Masana Oya, Mizuki Kuwabara, Shiori Takada, Aki Deguchi, Yuka Nakanishi, Kanako Hiramatsu, Jurina Matsui, Rena Matsui, Kumi Yagami
Team KII: Seira Sato, Mieko Sato
