= Kanon Kimoto =

Kanon Kimoto 木本 花音
- Also known as: Non
- Born: 11 August 1997 (age 29)
- Origin: Aichi Prefecture, Japan
- Genre: J-pop
- Occupations: Idol; singer
- Years active: 2010 – 2021
- Label: AKS

Kanon Kimoto (木本 花音, Kimoto Kanon; born 11 August 1997, in Aichi Prefecture) is a former member of the Japanese idol girl group SKE48. She was a member of SKE48's Team E, and a former member of HKT48.

== Career ==
Kimoto passed SKE48's 4th generation auditions in September 2010. Her debut was on October 5, 2010. Her first senbatsu was for the single 1! 2! 3! 4! Yoroshiku!. On December 6, 2010, she was promoted to Team E.

In the 2012 general elections, Kimoto placed 56th with 5,982 votes. In 2013, she improved her rank to 31st with 21,385 votes. In 2014, she placed 50th with 16,022 votes.

In February 2014, during the AKB48 Group Shuffle, it was announced she would have a concurrent position in HKT48's Team KIV. On 26 March 2015, it was announced that her concurrent position in HKT48 would be canceled.

On October 27, 2017, she announced that she will graduate from the group during SKE48's performance, she graduated from the group on December 1, 2017.

On April 9, 2021, Kimoto announced her retirement from the entertainment industry. Her contract with Knockout Co.Ltd expired on May 31, 2021.

== Discography ==
=== SKE48 singles ===
Year	No.	Title	Role	Notes
2010	4	"1! 2! 3! 4! Yoroshiku!"	A-side	First A-side. Also sang on "Seishun wa Hazukashii" and "Soba ni Isasete"
2011	5	"Banzai Venus"	A-side	
2011	6	"Pareo wa Emerald"	A-side	Also sang on "Tsumiki no Jikan" and "Hanabi wa Owaranai" as Selection 8.
2011	7	"Oki Doki"	A-side	Also sang on "Hatsukoi no Fumikiri" and "Utaōyo, Bokutachi no Kōka" as Selection 8.
2012	8	"Kataomoi Finally"	A-side	Also sang on "Kyō made no Koto, Korekara no koto" and "Kamoki no Tsuki" as Selection 8.
2012	9	"Aishite-love-ru!"	A-side	
2012	10	"Kiss datte Hidarikiki"	A-side	
2013	11	"Choco no Dorei"	A-side	
2013	12	"Utsukushii Inazuma"	A-side	Also sang on "Shalalana Calendar" and "Band wo Yarou yo"
2013	13	"Sansei Kawaii!"	A-side	Also sang on "Michi wa Naze Tsuzuku no ka" as Aichi Toyota Senbatsu and "Zutto Zutto Saki no Kyou" as Selection 18.
2014	14	"Mirai to wa?"	A-side	Also sang on "GALAXY of DREAMS" as the same-name-subgroup and "Machiawasetai"
2014	15	"Bukiyō Taiyō"	A-side	Also sang on "Tomodachi no Mama de" and "Banana Kakumei"
2014	16	"12 Gatsu no Kangaroo"	A-side	Also sang on "I love AICHI" as Aichi Toyota Senbatsu and "Seishun Curry Rice"

=== HKT48 singles ===
Year	No.	Title	Role	Notes
2014	4	"Hikaeme I Love You!"	A-side	Also sang on "Natsu no Mae" with Team KIV

=== AKB48 singles ===
Year	No.	Title	Role	Notes
2011	20	"Sakura no Ki ni Narō"	B-side	Sang on "Guuzen no Juujiro"
2011	22	"Flying Get"	B-side	Sang on "Yasai Uranai"
2011	23	"Kaze wa Fuiteiru"	B-side	Sang on "Kimi no Senaka"
2012	25	"Give Me Five!"	B-side	Sang on "NEW SHIP"
2012	26	"Manatsu no Sounds Good!"	A-side	First AKB48 A-side
2012	27	"Gingham Check"	B-side	Ranked 56th in 2012 General Election. Sang on "Show Fight!".
2012	28	"Uza"	B-side	Sang on "Tsugi no Season".
2012	29	"Eien Pressure"	B-side	Sang on "Tsuyogari Tokei"
2013	30	"So Long!"	B-side	Sang on "Waiting Room".
2013	31	"Sayonara Crawl"	A-side	
2013	32	"Koi Suru Fortune Cookie"	B-side	Ranked 31st in 2013 General Election. Sang on "Ai no Imi wo Kangaetemita"
2013	33	"Heart Electric"	B-side	Sang on "Kaisoku to Doutai Shiryoku"
2013	34	"Suzukake no Ki no Michi de "Kimi no Hohoemi o Yume ni Miru" to Itte Shimattara Bokutachi no Kankei wa Dō Kawatte Shimau no ka, Bokunari ni Nan-nichi ka Kangaeta Ue de no Yaya Kihazukashii Ketsuron no Yō na Mono"	B-side	Sang on "Escape"
2014	35	"Mae Shika Mukanee"	B-side	Sang on "Kinou Yori Motto Suki"
2014	36	"Labrador Retriever"	A-side	
2014	37	"Kokoro no Placard"	B-side	Ranked 50th in 2014 General Election. Sang on "Seikaku ga Warui Onna no Ko"
2014	38	"Kibouteki Refrain"	B-side	Sang on "Utaitai"
2015	39	"Green Flash"	B-side	Sang on "Sekai ga Naiteru Nara"

== Appearances ==
=== Movies ===
- Shimajirō to Ehon no Kuni ni (2016) Kicky (voice)

=== Dramas ===
- Majisuka Gakuen 2 (2011)
- Majisuka Gakuen 3 (2012)
