= Akane Takayanagi =

Akane Takayanagi 高柳 明音
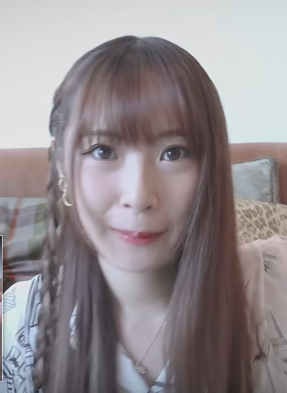

Background information
- Born: November 29, 1991 (age 34)
- Origin: Aichi Prefecture, Japan
- Genre: J-pop
- Occupations: Japanese idol; singer; voice actress
- Years active: 2009 – present
- Labels: Nippon Crown; Avex Group

Akane Takayanagi (高柳 明音, Takayanagi Akane; born November 29, 1991 in Aichi Prefecture) is a former member of the Japanese idol girl group SKE48. She joined SKE48 as a second-generation trainee in March 2009, before being promoted to Team KII. She was a member of SKE48 Team KII, and a former member of NMB48 Team BII.

== AKB48 general elections ==
At the AKB48 27th Single Senbatsu Election in 2012, Takayanagi ranked 24, which earned her a place in the Undergirls.

At the AKB48 53rd Single Senbatsu Election in 2018, Takayanagi ranked 18, which again earned her a place in the Undergirls.

== Personal life ==
Takayanagi's nickname 'Churi' comes from the sound that her pet parakeets make. Takayanagi also has five parakeets named Papi, Pino, Pucho and Popo, Pyuaru.

== Discography ==
=== SKE48 ===
==== Singles ====
| Year | No. | Title | Role | Notes |
|---|---|---|---|---|
| 2009 | 1 | "Tsuyoki Mono yo" | B-side | Sang on Team KII version (Theater Edition) |
| 2010 | 2 | "Aozora Kataomoi" | A-side | |
| 2010 | 3 | "Gomen ne, Summer" | A-side | |
| 2010 | 4 | "1! 2! 3! 4! Yoroshiku!" | A-side | Also sang on "Cosmos no Kioku" as Shirogumi |
| 2011 | 5 | "Banzai Venus" | A-side | Also sang on "Ai no Kazu" as Team KII. |
| 2011 | 6 | "Pareo wa Emerald" | A-side | Also sang on "Hanabi wa Owaranai" as Selection 8. |
| 2011 | 7 | "Okey Dokey" | A-side | Also sang on "Utaōyo, Bokutachi no Kōka" as Selection 8 |
| 2012 | 8 | "Kataomoi Finally" | A-side | Also sang on "Kamoki no Tsuki" as Selection 8; "Kyō made no Koto, Korekara no koto". |
| 2012 | 9 | "Aishite-love-ru!" | A-side | |
| 2012 | 10 | "Kiss Datte Hidarikiki" | A-side | |
| 2013 | 11 | "Choco no Dorei" | A-side | Also sang on "Bike to Sidecar" as 14 Carat. |
| 2013 | 12 | "Utsukushii Inazuma" | A-side | Also sang on ""Seishun no Mizushibuki" as Boat Pier Senbatsu; "Band wo Yarou yo" as Magical Band, "Futari dake no Parade" as Team KII. |
| 2013 | 13 | "Sansei Kawaii!" | A-side | Also sang on "Michi wa Naze Tsuzuku no ka?" as Aichi Toyota Senbatsu, "Zutto Zutto Saki no Kyou" as Selection 18. |
| 2014 | 14 | "Mirai to wa?" | A-side | Also sang on "GALAXY of DREAMS" as the same-name-subgroup; "S-ko to Usohakkenki" as Team KII, "Bokura no Kizuna", "Mayflower" as Dragon Girls. |
| 2014 | 15 | "Bukiyō Taiyō" | A-side | Also sang on "Coming soon" as Boat Pier Senbatsu; "Tomodachi no Mama de" as Selection 10; "Sayonara Kinou no Jibun" as Team KII |
| 2014 | 16 | "12 Gatsu no Kangaroo" | A-side | Also sang on "I love AICHI" as Aichi Toyota Senbatsu; "DADA Machine Gun" as Team KII; "Ai no Rule" as Sentai Hero Unit. |
| 2015 | 17 | "Coquettish Jūtai Chū" | A-side | Also sang on "Boku wa Shitteiru"; "Konya wa Join Us!" as Team KII. |
| 2015 | 18 | "Mae Nomeri" | A-side | Also sang on "Shozo ga kono Boku wo Damenisuru" as Team KII. |
| 2016 | 19 | "Chicken LINE" | A-side | Also sang on "Kiss Position" as Team KII; "Bouenkyou no Nai Tenmondai" as Passion For You Senbatsu. |
| 2016 | 20 | "Kin no Ai, Gin no Ai" | A-side | Also sang on "Happy Rankings." |
| 2017 | 21 | "Igai ni Mango" | A-side | Also sang on "En wo Egaku" as Team KII and "Kiseki no Ryūseigun" as Passion For You Senbatsu. |
| 2018 | 22 | "Muishiki no Iro" | A-side | Also sang on "Yoake no Coyote" as Sagami Chain Senbatsu and "We're Growing Up" as Aichi Toyota Senbatsu. |
| 2018 | 23 | "Ikinari Punch Line" | A-side | Also sang on "Dareka no Mimi" as Team KII and "Hana no Kaori no Symphony" as Passion For You Senbatsu. |
| 2018 | 24 | "Stand by You" | A-side | Also sang on "Ketobashita Nochi de Kuchizuke wo" as Team KII, "Jimotomintachi yo" as Aichi Toyota Senbatsu and "Kamisama wa Misutenai" |
| 2019 | 25 | "Frustration" | A-side | Also sang on "Game Shimasen ka?" as Passion For You Senbatsu. |
| 2020 | 26 | "Sōyūtoko Aru yo ne?" | A-side | Last single to participate. Also sang on "Seishun no Hoseki" which is her graduation song. |

==== Sub-Unit Singles ====
Koppu no Naka no Komorebi

- "Datte, Ame Janai?" / Transit Girls
- "Otanoshimi wa ashita kara" / Aichi Toyota Senbatsu

==== Albums ====
Kono Hi no Chime o Wasurenai

- "Shikatte yo, Darling!" / Team KII
- "Heavy Rotation" / Team KII
- "Sunenagara, Ame..." / Selection 8

Kakumei no Oka

- "Natsu yo, Isoge!"
- "Zero Base"
- "Horizon" / Aichi Toyota Senbatsu

=== NMB48 ===
==== Singles ====
| Year | No. | Title | Role | Notes |
|---|---|---|---|---|
| 2014 | 10 | "Rashikunai" | A-side | Only single with NMB48. Also sang on "Star ni Nante Naritakunai" as Team BII. |

==== Albums ====
Sekai no Chuushin wa Osaka ya ~Namba Jichiku~

- "Ibiza girl"
- "Kimi ni Yarareta" / Team BII
- "Peak"

=== AKB48 ===
==== Singles ====
| Year | No. | Title | Role | Notes |
|---|---|---|---|---|
| 2010 | 17 | "Heavy Rotation" | Under Girls | Ranked 35th in 2010 General Election. Sang on "Namida no Seesaw Game" |
| 2010 | 18 | "Beginner" | Under Girls | Sang on "Boku Dake no Value" |
| 2011 | 20 | "Sakura no Ki ni Narō" | Under Girls | Sang on "Gūzen no Jūjiro" |
| 2011 | 21 | "Everyday, Katyusha" | Under Girls | Sang on "Hito no Chikara" |
| 2011 | 22 | "Flying Get" | Under Girls | Ranked 23rd in 2011 General Election. Sang on "Dakishimecha Ikenai" and "Yasai Uranai" as Yasai Sisters. |
| 2011 | 23 | "Kaze wa Fuiteiru" | Under Girls | Sang on "Kimi no Senaka" |
| 2012 | 25 | "Give Me Five!" | B-side | Sang on "Hitsujikai no Tabi" as Special Girls B. |
| 2012 | 26 | "Manatsu no Sounds Good!" | A-side | First AKB48 A-side. |
| 2012 | 27 | "Gingham Check" | Under Girls | Ranked 24th in 2012 General Election. Sang on "Nante Bohemian" |
| 2012 | 29 | "Eien Pressure" | B-side | Sang on "Tsuyogari Tokei" as SKE48. |
| 2013 | 32 | "Koi Suru Fortune Cookie" | Under Girls | Ranked 23rd in 2013 General Election. Sang on "Ai no Imi wo Kangaete Mita". |
| 2013 | 33 | "Heart Electric" | Under Girls | Sang on "Kaisoku to dōtai shiryoku" . |
| 2013 | 34 | "Suzukake no Ki no Michi de "Kimi no Hohoemi o Yume ni Miru" to Itte Shimattara Bokutachi no Kankei wa Dō Kawatte Shimau no ka, Bokunari ni Nan-nichi ka Kangaeta Ue de no Yaya Kihazukashii Ketsuron no Yō na Mono" | B-side | Sang on "Escape" as SKE48. |
2014
| 2014 | 35 | "Mae shika Mukanee" | Talking Chimpanzees | Sang on "KONJO". |
| 2014 | 37 | "Kokoro no Placard" | Under Girls | Ranked 31st in 2014 General Election. Sang on "Dareka ga Nageta Ball" |
| 2014 | 38 | "Kibōteki Refrain" | B-side | Sang on "Utaitai" as Katareagumi (Cattleya Group). |
2015
| 2015 | 39 | "Green Flash" | B-side | Sang on "Sekai ga Naiteru Nara" as SKE48. |
| 2015 | 41 | "Halloween Night" | A-side | Ranked 14th in 2015 General Election. |
| 2016 | 43 | "Kimi wa Melody" | B-side | Sang on "Gonna Jump" as SKE48. |
| 2016 | 45 | "LOVE TRIP / Shiawase wo Wakenasai" | Under Girls | Ranked 20th in 2016 General Election. Sang on "Densetsu no Sakana" and "Hikari to Kage no Hibi" |
| 2016 | 46 | "High Tension" | Team Vocal | Sang on "Mata Anata no Koto wo Kangaeteta" |
| 2017 | 47 | "Shoot Sign" | B-side | Sang on "Vacancy" as SKE48. |
| 2017 | 48 | "Negaigoto no Mochigusare" | A-side | Also sang on "Anogoro no Gohyaku Yen Dama" |
| 2017 | 49 | "#SukiNanda" | A-side | Ranked 15th in 2017 General Election. |
| 2017 | 50 | "11gatsu no Anklet" | B-side | Sang on "Yosougai no Story" as Vocal Senbatsu. |
| 2018 | 51 | "Jabaja" | B-side | Sang on "Ai no Moake" as SKE48. |
| 2018 | 53 | "Sentimental Train" | Under Girls | Ranked 18th in 2018 General Election. Sang on "Sandal ja Dekinai Koi" |

==== Albums ====
Koko ni Ita Koto

- "Koko ni Ita Koto"

1830m

- "Aozora yo Sabishikunai Ka?"

Tsugi no Ashiato

- "JJ ni Karitamono"

Koko ga Rhodes da, Koko de Tobe!

- "Ikitsuzukeru"

Thumbnail

- "Hibiwareta Kagami"

=== Films ===
- Oretachi no Ashita (2014)
- Jōrei Tantei (2014)

=== TV dramas ===
- Mōsō Deka! (Tōkai Television Broadcasting, 2011)
- Majisuka Gakuen 3 (TV Tokyo, 2012)
- Kintoku Special (NHK, 2014), Misaki Tanba
- AKB Horror Night: Adrenaline's Night Ep.14 – Video Posted (TV Asahi, 2015)
- AKB Love Night: Love Factory Ep.16 – Catch in the Dark (TV Asahi, 2016) as Minami
- Takasugi-san's Obento (Chukyo TV, Nippon TV, 2024) as Asako Marumiya
