= Kono Hi no Chime o Wasurenai =

Kono Hi no Chime o Wasurenai (この日のチャイムを忘れない）

Studio album by SKE48
- Released: September 19, 2012 (JP)
- Recorded: 2009–2012 (Japan)
- Genre: J-pop
- Length: 62:23
- Label: Avex (Avex Trax)
- Producer: Yasushi Akimoto

Singles from Kono Hi no Chime o Wasurenai
- 1. "Tsuyoki Mono yo" Released: August 5, 2009; 2. "Aozora Kataomoi" Released: May 24, 2010; 3. "Gomen ne, Summer" Released: July 7, 2010; 4. "1! 2! 3! 4! Yoroshiku!" Released: November 17, 2010; 5. "Banzai Venus" Released: March 9, 2011; 6. "Pareo wa Emerald" Released: July 27, 2011; 7. "Okey Dokey" Released: November 9, 2011; 8. "Kataomoi Finally" Released: January 25, 2012

Kono Hi no Chime o Wasurenai (この日のチャイムを忘れない, "I don't forget this day's chime") is the first album by the Japanese idol girl group SKE48. It was released in Japan on September 19, 2012 by Avex Group.

== Album information ==
'Kono Hi no Chime o Wasurenai' is the first original album released by SKE48. All of the 63 members of SKE48 had their own music video. This made the Album set a new Guinness World Record, for the most number of music videos on an album with 63 videos.

== Reception ==
The album debuted at number one on the Oricon daily chart, with first day sales of 51,875. It reached number two on Oricon's weekly chart, and stayed on the charts for 25 weeks.

== Track listing ==
The album contains eight of SKE48's previously released singles. Five original songs were written and performed respectively by: Team S, Team KII, Team E, Kenkyuusei, Selection 8, the last of which was a subunit of 8 SKE48 members. These songs were placed on each album version. The SKE48 teams then covered 3 AKB48 singles, "Beginner" by Team S, "Heavy Rotation" by Team KII, and "Ponytail to Shushu" by Team E. The AKB48 cover songs were distributed across different album versions.

=== CD + DVD ===
DISK 1
No.	Title	Artist(s)	Length
1.	"Tsuyoki Mono yo" (強き者よ ”Strong Ones!")
2.	"Aozora Kataomoi" (青空片想い "Unrequited Love Under the Blue Sky")
3.	"Gomen ne, Summer" (ごめんね、SUMMER "Sorry, Summer")
4.	"1! 2! 3! 4! Yoroshiku!" (１！２！３！４！ヨロシク！ "1! 2! 3! 4! I'm Counting on You!")
5.	"Banzai Venus" (バンザイVENUS "Hooray Venus")
6.	"Pareo wa Emerald" (パレオはエメラルド "My Pareo is an Emerald")
7.	"Okey Dokey" (オキドキ)
8.	"Kataomoi Finally" (片想いFinally "Unrequited Love Finally")
9.	"Hula Hoop de GO! GO! GO!" (フラフープでGO!GO!GO! "Hula Hoop GO! GO! GO!")	Team S
10.	"Shikatte yo, Darling!" (叱ってよ、ダーリン！ "I rebuke, Darling!")	Team KII
11.	"Mitsubachi Girl" (みつばちガール "Girl Bees")	Team E
12.	"Sono Saki ni Kimi ga Ita" (その先に君がいた "That you had previously")	Kenkyuusei
13.	"Sunenagara, Ame…" (拗ねながら、雨・・・ "While sulking, Rain...")	Selection 8 (Yuria Kizaki, Akari Suda, Jurina Matsui, Rena Matsui, Shiori Ogiso, Akane Takayanagi, Manatsu Mukaida, Kanon Kimoto)
14.	"Heavy Rotation" (ヘビーローテーション)	Team KII

DISK 2
No.	Title	Artist(s)	Length
1.	"63 Member Music Videos" (６３人６３曲６３ Music Video)	All 63 SKE48 Members

=== CD Only ===
DISK 1
No.	Title	Artist(s)	Length
1.	"Tsuyoki Mono yo" (強き者よ ”Strong Ones!")
2.	"Aozora Kataomoi" (青空片想い "Unrequited Love Under the Blue Sky")
3.	"Gomen ne, Summer" (ごめんね、SUMMER "Sorry, Summer")
4.	"1! 2! 3! 4! Yoroshiku!" (１！２！３！４！ヨロシク！ "1! 2! 3! 4! I'm Counting on You!")
5.	"Banzai Venus" (バンザイVENUS "Hooray Venus")
6.	"Pareo wa Emerald" (パレオはエメラルド "My Pareo is an Emerald")
7.	"Okey Dokey" (オキドキ)
8.	"Kataomoi Finally" (片想いFinally "Unrequited Love Finally")
9.	"Hula Hoop de GO! GO! GO!" (フラフープでGO!GO!GO! "Hula Hoop GO! GO! GO!")	Team S
10.	"Shikatte yo, Darling!" (叱ってよ、ダーリン！ "I rebuke, Darling!")	Team KII
11.	"Mitsubachi Girl" (みつばちガール "Girl Bees")	Team E
12.	"Sono Saki ni Kimi ga Ita" (その先に君がいた "That you had previously")	Kenkyuusei
13.	"Sunenagara, Ame…" (拗ねながら、雨・・・ "While sulking, Rain...")	Selection 8 (Yuria Kizaki, Akari Suda, Jurina Matsui, Rena Matsui, Shiori Ogiso, Akane Takayanagi, Manatsu Mukaida, Kanon Kimoto)
14.	"Ponytail to Shushu" (ポニーテールとシュシュ "Ponytail and Sruchies")	Team E
15.	"Beginner"	Team S

== Oricon charts ==
Release	Oricon Albums Chart	Peak position	Debut sales (copies)
August 15, 2012	Daily Chart	1	51,875
August 15, 2012	Weekly Chart	2	110,613

== Release history ==
Country	Date	Format	Label	Catalog	EAN
Japan	August 15, 2012	CD; CD/DVD; DL	Avex (Avex Trax)	AVCD-38569	4988064385690
Japan	August 15, 2012	CD; CD/DVD; DL	Avex (Avex Trax)	AVCD-38568/B	4988064385683
