= Choco no Dorei =

- Type A cover

Single by SKE48
- Released: January 30, 2013 (Japan)
- Genre: J-pop
- Label: avex trax
- Songwriter: Yasushi Akimoto (lyrics)
- Producer: Yasushi Akimoto

SKE48 singles chronology
"Kiss Datte Hidarikiki" (2012)	"Choco no Dorei" (2013)	"Utsukushii Inazuma" (2013)

Choco no Dorei (チョコの奴隷; A Slave to Chocolate) is the 11th single by Japanese girl group SKE48, released in Japan on January 30, 2013.

== Members ==
=== "Choco no Dorei" ===
(Center: Jurina Matsui)

- Team S: Masana Oya, Yuria Kizaki, Rie Kitahara, Nanako Suga, Akari Suda, Jurina Matsui, Rena Matsui, Kumi Yagami
- Team KII: Anna Ishida, Shiori Ogiso, Akane Takayanagi, Sawako Hata, Airi Furukawa, Manatsu Mukaida, Miki Yakata
- Team E: Kanon Kimoto

=== "Darkness" ===
- Team S: Yuria Kizaki, Yukiko Kinoshita, Mizuki Kuwabara, Jurina Matsui, Kumi Yagami
- Team KII: Anna Ishida
- Team E: Mai Takeuchi

=== "Bike to Sidecar" ===
- Team S: Masana Oya, Akari Suda, Shiori Takada, Aki Deguchi, Yuka Nakanishi, Kanako Hiramatsu, Rena Matsui
- Team KII: Shiori Ogiso, Akane Takayanagi, Mieko Sato, Sawako Hata, Airi Furukawa, Miki Yakata
- Team E: Madoka Umemoto

=== "Fuyu no Kamome" ===
- Team KII: Riho Abiru, Tomoko Kato, Risako Goto, Rina Matsumoto, Reika Yamada
- Team E: Kyoka Ishohara, Mikoto Uchiyama, Ami Kobayashi, Makiko Saito, Mei Sakai, Aya Shibata, Rika Tsuzuki
- Kenkyuusei: Asana Inuzuka, Tsugumi Iwanaga, Yuna Ego, Sayaka Niidoi, Miki Hioki, Haruka Futamura, Kaori Matsumura, Honoka Mizuno, Ami Miyamae

=== "Oikake Shadow" ===
- Team S: Rumi Kato, Momona Kito
- Team KII: Shiori Iguchi, Seira Sato
- Team E: Shiori Kanako, Yumana Takagi, Nao Furuhata, Yukari Yamashita
- Kenkyuusei: Narumi Ichino, Arisa Owaki, Mitsuki Fujimoto, Mizuho Yamada

=== "Sore o Seishun to Yobu Hi" ===
- Team S: Mizuki Kuwabara, Shiori Takada, Kanako Hiramatsu, Kumi Yagami
- Team KII: Ririna Akaeda, Shiori Ogiso
- Team E: Kasumi Ueno, Minami Hara
- Kenkyuusei: Emiri Kobayashi

== Oricon Charts ==
Release	Oricon Singles Chart	Peak position	Debut sales (copies)	Sales total (copies)
January 30, 2013	Daily Chart	1	380,752	632,401
January 30, 2013	Weekly Chart	1	538,914	632,401
January 30, 2013	Monthly Chart	1	538,914	632,401
