= Pareo (disambiguation) =

A pareo is a wraparound skirt worn in Tahiti.

Pareo may also refer to:

- Pareo wa Emerald, the 6th single by Japanese girl group SKE48
- PAREO, the stage name of Reona Nyūbara, a fictional character from BanG Dream!
