= 1! 2! 3! 4! Yoroshiku! =

"1! 2! 3! 4! Yoroshiku! (1！2！3！4！ヨロシク！)"

Single by SKE48
- Released: November 17, 2010 (Japan)
- Genre: J-pop
- Label: Nippon Crown Records
- Songwriter: Yasushi Akimoto (lyrics)
- Producer: Yasushi Akimoto

SKE48 singles chronology
"Gomen ne, Summer" (2010)	"1! 2! 3! 4! Yoroshiku! (1！2！3！4！ヨロシク！)" (2010)	"Banzai Venus" (2011)

"1! 2! 3! 4! Yoroshiku!" ("1！2！3！4！ヨロシク！") is the 4th single by Japanese girl group SKE48. It reached the 2nd place on the weekly Oricon Singles Chart and, as of February 6, 2012 (issue date), has sold 175,027 copies.

This was last full version music video featured on SKE48 official channel (YouTube); starting from "Banzai Venus" only short versions are featured.

== Members ==
=== "1!2!3!4! Yoroshiku" ===
- Team S: Masana Ōya, Yukiko Kinoshita, Yuria Kizaki, Mizuki Kuwabara, Akari Suda, Kanako Hirmatsu, Yuka Nakanishi, Jurina Matsui, Rena Matsui, Kumi Yagami
- Team KII: Anna Ishida, Airi Furukawa, Akane Takayanagi, Manatsu Mukaida
- Kenkyuusei: Kanon Kimoto, Erika Yamada

=== "TWO ROSES" ===
Kinect

- Team S: Jurina Matsui, Rena Matsui

=== "Seishun wa Hazukashii" ===
Akagumi

- Team S: Rumi Kato, Yuria Kizaki, Yukiko Kinoshita, Akari Suda, Shiori Takada, Aki Deguchi, Rena Matsui, Kumi Yagami
- Team KII: Shiori Iguchi, Shiori Ogiso, Momona Kitō, Seira Sato, Airi Furukawa, Mukaida Manatsu
- Kenkyuusei: Mai Imade, Kasumi Ueno, Sawako Hata, Kaori Matsumura, Haruka Mano, Miki Yakata, Madoka Umemoto, Shiori Kaneko, Kanon Kimoto, Emiri Kobayashi, Yumana Takagi, Mai Takeuchi, Marin Nonoyama, Minami Hara, Yukari Yamashita

=== "Cosmos no Kioku" ===
Shirogumi

- Team S: Masana Oya, Haruka Ono, Mizuki Kuwabara, Yuka Nakanishi, Rikako Hirata, Kanako Hiramatsu, Jurina Matsui
- Team KII: Ririna Akaeda, Anna Ishida, Mikoto Uchiyama, Tomoko Kato, Makiko Saito, Mieko Sato, Akane Takayanagi, Rina Matsumoto, Reika Yamada, Tomoka Wakabayashi
- Kenkyuusei: Riho Abiru, Kyoka Isohara, Risako Goto, Erika Yamada, Asana Inuzuka, Ami Kobayashi, Mei Sakai, Aya Shibata, Rika Tsuzuki, Yuka Nakamura, Honoka Mizuno

=== "Soba ni Isasete" ===
All current SKE48 members (57 members)

== Other versions ==
- MNL48, AKB48's sister group in the Philippines, made a Filipino version of the song "1! 2! 3! 4! Yoroshiku!". The song was included on the group's fifth single, "High Tension", officially released on November 25, 2019.
- Indonesian idol group JKT48, a sister group of AKB48, covered the song "1! 2! 3! 4! Yoroshiku!". The song was included on the group's second single, "Apakah Kau Melihat Mentari Senja?", officially released on July 3, 2013.
