= Heart Electric =

2013 single by AKB48

Single by AKB48

from the album Koko ga Rhodes da, Koko de Tobe!
- Released: October 30, 2013
- Genre: J-pop
- Label: You, Be Cool! / King
- Producer: Yasushi Akimoto

AKB48 singles chronology
"Koi Suru Fortune Cookie" (2013)	"Heart Electric" (2013)	"Suzukake no Ki no Michi de...Yaya Kihazukashii Ketsuron no Yō na Mono" (2013)

Music video
- AKB48 "Heart Electric" (Dance Ver.) on YouTube

"Heart Electric" (ハート・エレキ, Hāto Ereki; also "Heart Ereki") is the 33rd single by the Japanese idol girl group AKB48. It was released in Japan on October 30, 2013. The participating members for the title track were given English nicknames. The single reached number one on Oricon and Billboard's weekly charts.

== Promotion and release ==
During AKB48's annual rock-paper-scissors tournament held at the Nippon Budokan area on September 18, 2013, AKB48 announced the lineup for "Heart Electric", and the release date of October 30. Haruna Kojima was announced last and come out with a red skirt in contrast to the blue skirts of the other members; this indicated that she was the center of the single. This marks Kojima's first time as a solo center. The group then performed the song and introduced themselves with English nicknames.

The single was released in nine editions: four regular, four limited, and a theater edition. The limited editions contain a ticket for a handshake event and a randomly selected sticker of one of the 16 nicknamed girls. The regular editions are the same as the limited editions except that they contain one of 48 photos instead of the handshake ticket. The Type-K edition has a DVD documentary about the graduation of Sayaka Akimoto.

== Musical style, writing, composition ==
The song was done by RoopSounds, who had previously done "Skirt, Hirari". The music is described as being like a marching band. During the performance, Kojima does a roll-call of some of the participants, each of whom has an English nickname. This was explained as being according to band protocols.

== Music video ==
The music video for Heart Electric was directed by Shusuke Kaneko who is known for the Heisei Gamera trilogy, Godzilla, Mothra and King Ghidorah: Giant Monsters All-Out Attack, and the live-action film adaptation of Death Note. The video premiered at the group's handshake event at the Osaka Dome. It is described as girls competing for individuality in a band called "The G. Fingers". Kojima, who plays Michelle, said that "there were a lot of scenes we shot for the music video, and remembering all the nicknames for the band members was really difficult."

== Track listing ==
=== Type A ===
CD
No.	Title	Performance	Length
1.	"Heart Electric" (ハート・エレキ)
2.	"Kaisoku to dōtai shiryoku" (快速と動体視力)	Under Girls (アンダーガールズ)
3.	"Kisu made Countdown (Countdown to Kiss)" (キスまでカウントダウン)	Team A
4.	"Heart Electric off vocal ver." (ハート・エレキ off vocal ver.)
5.	"Kaisoku to dōtai shiryoku off vocal ver." (快速と動体視力 off vocal ver.)
6.	"Kisu made Countdown (Countdown to Kiss) off vocal ver." (キスまでカウントダウン off vocal ver.)

DVD
No.	Title	Length
1.	"Heart Electric Music Video" (ハート・エレキ Music Video)
2.	"Heart Electric Music Video -Dance ver.-" (ハート・エレキ Music Video -Dance ver.-)
3.	"Kaisoku to dōtai shiryoku Music Video" (快速と動体視力 Music Video)
4.	"Kisu made Countdown (Countdown to Kiss) Music Video" (キスまでカウントダウン Music Video)

=== Type K ===
CD
No.	Title	Performance	Length
1.	"Heart Electric" (ハート・エレキ)
2.	"Kaisoku to dōtai shiryoku" (快速と動体視力)	Under Girls (アンダーガールズ)
3.	"Sasameyuki Regret (Light snowfall regret)" (細雪リグレット)	Team K
4.	"Heart Electric off vocal ver." (ハート・エレキ off vocal ver.)
5.	"Kaisoku to dōtai shiryoku off vocal ver." (快速と動体視力 off vocal ver.)
6.	"Sasameyuki Regret off vocal ver." (細雪リグレット off vocal ver.)

DVD
No.	Title	Length
1.	"Heart Electric Music Video" (ハート・エレキ Music Video)
2.	"Heart Electric Music Video -Dance ver.-" (ハート・エレキ Music Video -Dance ver.-)
3.	"Kaisoku to dōtai shiryoku Music Video" (快速と動体視力 Music Video)
4.	"Sasameyuki Regret Music Video" (細雪リグレット Music Video)
5.	"Sayaka Akimoto graduation documentary: Between strength and weakness" (秋元才加 卒業ドキュメント「強さと弱さの間で」)

=== Type B ===
CD
No.	Title	Performance	Length
1.	"Heart Electric" (ハート・エレキ)
2.	"Kimi dake ni Chu! Chu! Chu!" (君だけにChu! Chu! Chu!)	てんとうむChu!
3.	"Tiny T-shirt"	Team B
4.	"Heart Electric off vocal ver." (ハート・エレキ off vocal ver.)
5.	"Kimi dake ni Chu! Chu! Chu! off vocal ver." (君だけにChu! Chu! Chu! off vocal ver.)
6.	"Tiny T-shirt off vocal ver."

DVD
No.	Title	Length
1.	"Heart Electric Music Video" (ハート・エレキ Music Video)
2.	"Heart Electric Music Video -Dance ver.-" (ハート・エレキ Music Video -Dance ver.-)
3.	"Kimi dake ni Chu! Chu! Chu! Music Video" (君だけにChu! Chu! Chu! Music Video)
4.	"Tiny T-Shirt Music Video"
5.	"Tentoumu Chu! documentary" (てんとうむChu! ドキュメント)

=== Type 4 ===
CD
No.	Title	Performance	Length
1.	"Heart Electric" (ハート・エレキ)
2.	"Kaisoku to dōtai shiryoku" (快速と動体視力)	Under Girls (アンダーガールズ)
3.	"Seijun Philosophy (Innocent Philosophy)" (清純フィロソフィー)	Team 4
4.	"Heart Electric off vocal ver." (ハート・エレキ off vocal ver.)
5.	"Kaisoku to dōtai shiryoku off vocal ver." (快速と動体視力 off vocal ver.)
6.	"Seijun Philosophy off vocal ver." (清純フィロソフィー off vocal ver.)

DVD
No.	Title	Length
1.	"Heart Electric Music Video" (ハート・エレキ Music Video)
2.	"Heart Electric Music Video -Dance ver.-" (ハート・エレキ Music Video -Dance ver.-)
3.	"Kaisoku to dōtai shiryoku Music Video" (快速と動体視力 Music Video)
4.	"Seijun Philosophy Music Video" (清純フィロソフィー Music Video)
5.	"Team 4・Kenkyuusei Auditions 〜The Feelings that you want to tell before Graduation〜" (チーム4・研究生オーディション ～卒業を前に伝えたい想いがある～)

=== Theater ===
CD
No.	Title	Performance	Length
1.	"Heart Electric" (ハート・エレキ)
2.	"Kaisoku to dōtai shiryoku" (快速と動体視力)	Under Girls (アンダーガールズ)
3.	"Kimi no hitomi wa Planetarium (Your eyes planetarium)" (君の瞳はプラネタリウム)	AKB48 Kenkyusei (AKB48研究生)
4.	"Heart Electric off vocal ver." (ハート・エレキ off vocal ver.)
5.	"Kaisoku to dōtai shiryoku off vocal ver." (快速と動体視力 off vocal ver.)
6.	"Kimi no hitomi wa Planetarium off vocal ver." (君の瞳はプラネタリウム off vocal ver.)

== Personnel ==
=== "Heart Electric" ===
The title track is sung by 16 members; each girl has been given an English nickname:

Center : Haruna Kojima

Team A

- Anna Iriyama - Veronica
- Minami Takahashi - Linda
- Rina Kawaei - Kawaey
- Yui Yokoyama - Mary
- Mayu Watanabe - Elizabeth

Team K

- Yuko Oshima - Lucy

Team B

- Yuki Kashiwagi – Catherine
- Haruna Kojima - Michelle
- Haruka Shimazaki - Angelina

Team 4

- Minami Minegishi - Barbara

Team S

- Jurina Matsui - Caroline

Team E

- Rena Matsui - Sandy

Team N

- Miyuki Watanabe - Josephine
- Sayaka Yamamoto - Rosanna

Team H

- Aika Oota - Margaret
- Rino Sashihara - Laura

=== "Kaisoku to Doutai Shiryoku" ===
The song is performed by Under Girls.

Centers: Rena Kato, Akari Suda.

- Team A: Karen Iwata, Ayaka Kikuchi, Sumire Sato, Juri Takahashi
- Team K: Rie Kitahara, Asuka Kuramochi, Tomu Muto
- Team B: Miori Ichikawa, Ayaka Umeda, Mina Oba, Rena Kato
- SKE48 Team S: Yuria Kizaki
- SKE 48 Team KII: Akane Takayanagi, Akari Suda
- SKE48 Team E: Kanon Kimoto, Nao Furuhata
- NMB48 Team M: Fuuko Yagura
- HKT48 Team H: Haruka Kodama, Sakura Miyawaki
- JKT48 Team J/ AKB48 Team B: Aki Takajo

=== "Kimi Dake ni Chu! Chu! Chu!" ===
Performed by Tentoumu Chu! (てんとうむChu!):

Center: Mako Kojima

- Team 4: Nana Okada, Mako Kojima, Miki Nishino
- SKE48 Kenkyuusei: Ryoha Kitagawa
- NMB48 Kenkyuusei: Nagisa Shibuya
- HKT48 Kenkyuusei: Meru Tashima, Mio Tomonaga

=== ""Kiss made Countdown" ===
Performed by Team A:

Center: Mayu Watanabe

Team A: Rina Izuta, Anna Iriyama, Karen Iwata, Ryoka Oshima, Rina Kawaei, Ayaka Kikuchi, Haruka Kodama, Marina Kobayashi, Yukari Sasaki, Sato Sumire, Mariya Suzuki, Juri Takahashi, Minami Takahashi, Yuuka Tano, Matsui Sakiko, Ayaka Morikawa, Fuuko Yagura, Yui Yokoyama, Mayu Watanabe

=== "Sasameyuki Regret" ===
Performed by Team K:

Centers: Yuko Oshima, Jurina Matsui

Team K:Maria Abe, Mayumi Uchida, Yuko Oshima, Rie Kitahara, Asuka Kuramochi, Kana Kobayashi, Amina Sato, Haruka Shimada, Shihori Suzuki, Rina Chikano, Chisato Nakata, Mariya Nagao, Rena Nozawa, Rina Hirata, Nana Fujita, Nao Furuhata, Ami Maeda, Jurina Matsui, Miho Miyazaki, Tomu Muto

- Team 4: Moe Aigasa
- Kenkyuusei: Ami Yumoto

Note: Moe Aigasa and Ami Yumoto were chosen from a special audition among the 13th, 14th, and 15th generation members in Team 4 and Kenkyuusei, as documented in the Type-4 DVD. They auditioned for Sayaka Akimoto and Tomomi Itano, 2 Team K members who were graduating from AKB48 in 2013. Finally, The winner was announced with Aigasa picked by Akimoto and Yumoto picked by Itano.

=== "Tiny T-shirt" ===
Performed by Team B:

Center: Yuki Kashiwagi

Team B: Haruka Ishida, Miori Ichikawa, Misaki Iwasa, Ayaka Umeda, Mina Oba, Miyuu Omori, Shizuka Oya, Yuki Kashiwagi, Haruka Katayama, Rena Kato, Natsuki Kojima, Haruna Kojima, Haruka Shimazaki, Aki Takajo, Miyu Takeuchi, Miku Tanabe, Mariko Nakamura, Wakana Natori, Misato Nonaka, Reina Fujie, Suzuran Yamauchi, Miyuki Watanabe

=== "Seijun Philosophy" ===
Performed by Team 4:

Center: Mako Kojima

- Team 4: Moe Aigasa, Saho Iwatate, Natsuki Uchiyama, Ayano Umeta, Ayaka Okada, Nana Okada, Saki Kitazawa, Mako Kojima, Shinozaki Ayana, Takashima Yurina, Nishino Miki, Hashimoto Hikari, Maeda Mitsuki, Minegishi Minami, Murayama Yuiri, Mogi Shinobu

=== "Kimi no Hitomi wa Planetarium" ===
Kenkyuusei (研究生) Center: Nana Owada

Kenkyuusei: Ichikawa Manami, Owada Nana, Haruka Komiyama, Sato Kiara, Tsuchiyasu Mizuki, Fukuoka Seina, Mion Mukaichi, Yumoto Ami

== Charts ==
=== Billboard charts ===
Chart (2013)	Peak position
Japan Hot 100 (Billboard)	1

=== Oricon charts ===
Release	Oricon Singles Chart	Peak position	Debut sales (copies)	Sales total (copies)
October 30, 2013	Daily Chart	1	1,020,800	1,203,586
October 30, 2013	Weekly Chart	1	1,203,586	1,203,586
October 30, 2013	Monthly Chart	1	1,203,586	1,203,586

=== G-music (Taiwan) ===
Chart	Peak position
Combo	19

=== Year-end charts ===
Chart (2013)	Position
Billboard Japan Hot 100	10
Billboard Japan Hot Singles Sales	7
Oricon yearly singles	3

== Release history ==
Date	Version	Catalog	Format	Label
October 30, 2013	Type-A	First Press Limited Edition (KIZM-90235~6); Regular Edition (KIZM-235~6)	CD+DVD	King Records
October 30, 2013	Type-K	First Press Limited Edition (KIZM-90237~8); Regular Edition (KIZM-237~8)	CD+DVD	King Records
October 30, 2013	Type-B	First Press Limited Edition (KIZM-90239~40); Regular Edition (KIZM-239~40)	CD+DVD	King Records
October 30, 2013	Type-4	First Press Limited Edition (KIZM-90263~4); Regular Edition (KIZM-263~4)	CD+DVD	King Records
October 30, 2013	Theater	Regular Version (NMAX-1158)	CD	King Records

== SNH48 version ==
"Heart Electric"

Single by SNH48
- B-side: "Kondo Koso Ecstasy"; "Ai no Imi wo Kangaete Mita"; "Zero-sum Taiyō"; "Gingham Check"
- Released: March 12, 2014
- Genre: Pop rock
- Label: Ocean Butterflies Music
- Songwriters: Original Japanese lyrics: Yasushi Akimoto; Chinese lyrics: Shanghai Xingsiba; Composer: Manabu Marutani; Yoshimasa Inoue; Kota Ogawa; Jyunryu; Yusuke Itagaki
- Producer: Yasushi Akimoto

SNH48 singles chronology
"Fortune Cookie of Love" (2013)	"Heart Electric" (2014)	"Halloween Night" (2015)

"Heart Electric" (Chinese: 心电感应; pinyin: Xīndiàn gǎnyìng) was redone in Mandarin for AKB48's sister group in China, SNH48, as the group's fourth single. It was available for ordering on March 12 in the SNH48 official online store.
