= List of Oricon number-one singles of 2011 =

The highest-selling singles in Japan are ranked in the Oricon Weekly Chart, which is published by Oricon Style magazine. The data are compiled by Oricon based on each singles' weekly physical sales.

== Chart history ==
Issue Date	Singles	Artist(s)	Reference(s)
January 3	"Dream On"	Naoya Urata featuring Ayumi Hamasaki	
January 10	"Toilet no Kamisama"	Kana Uemura	
January 17	"Toilet no Kamisama"	Kana Uemura	
January 24	"Dada"	Radwimps	
January 31	"Hadakanbō" (はだかんぼー; Nude)	Tomohisa Yamashita	
February 7	"Why? (Keep Your Head Down)"	TVXQ	
February 14	"Ultimate Wheels"	KAT-TUN	
February 21	"Each Other's Way (Tabi no Tochū)" (Each Other's Way 〜旅の途中〜; Each Other's Way (On the Way to Travel))	Exile	
February 28	"Sakura no Ki ni Narō"	AKB48	
March 7	"Lotus"	Arashi	
March 14	"Eternal"	Jin Akanishi	
March 21	"Banzai Venus" (バンザイVenus; Hooray Venus)	SKE48	
March 28	"Shūmatsu Not Yet" (週末Not yet; Weekend Not Yet)	Not Yet	
April 4	"Greatest the Hits 2011–2011"	Maximum the Hormone	
April 11	"Greatest the Hits 2011–2011"	Maximum the Hormone	
April 18	"Jet Coaster Love"	Kara	
April 25	"Sayonara Kizu Darake no Hibi yo"	B'z	
May 2	"T.W.L/Yellow Pansy Street"	Kanjani Eight	
May 9	"Let Me Cry"	Jang Keun-suk	
May 16	"Shōjo Hikō"	Passpo	
May 23	"My Home"	Kanjani Eight	
May 30	"White"	KAT-TUN	
June 6	"Everyday, Kachūsha"	AKB48	
June 13	"Don't Wanna Lie"	B'z	
June 20	"365 Nichi Kazoku"	Kanjani Eight	
June 27	"Time"	KinKi Kids	
July 4	"Flower"	Atsuko Maeda	
July 11	"OVER"	Hey! Say! JUMP	
July 18	"Naminori Kakigōri" (波乗りかき氷; Surfing Kakigōri)	Not Yet	
July 25	"Fui ni" (ふいに; Suddenly)	Tomomi Itano	
August 1	"Zetsumetsu Kurokami Shōjo"	NMB48	
August 8	"Pareo wa Emerald" (パレオはエメラルド, Pareo wa Emerarudo; Pareo Is Emerald)	SKE48	
August 15	"Run for You"	KAT-TUN	
August 22	"Everybody Go"	Kis-My-Ft2	
August 29	"Tsubusa ni Koi"	Kanjani Eight	
September 5	"Flying Get"	AKB48	
September 12	"Kazoku ni Narō yo/Fighting Pose" (家族になろうよ/fighting pose; Let's Be a Family)	Masaharu Fukuyama	
September 19	"Fighters"	Sandaime J Soul Brothers	
September 26	"Rising Sun/Itsuka Kitto..." (Rising Sun/いつかきっと…; Surely Someday…)	Exile/Exile Atsushi	
October 3	"Magic Power"	Hey! Say! JUMP	
October 10	"Bo Peep Bo Peep"	T-ara	
October 17	"Green a.Live"	Yui	
October 24	"XXX"	L'Arc-en-Ciel	
October 31	"Oh My Gā!"	NMB48	
November 7	"Kaze wa Fuiteiru"	AKB48	
November 14	"Meikyū Love Song"	Arashi	
November 21	"Okie Dokie"	SKE48	
November 28	"Sexy Zone"	Sexy Zone	
December 5	"Saisho no Mail" (最初のメール, Saisho no Mēru; First E-mail)	French Kiss	
December 12	"Birth"	KAT-TUN	
December 19	"Ue kara Mariko"	AKB48	
December 26	"We Never Give Up!"	Kis-My-Ft2	

== See also ==
- 2011 in music
