= Kokoro no Placard =

2014 single by AKB48

- Type-A Regular Edition Cover

Single by AKB48

from the album Koko ga Rhodes da, Koko de Tobe!
- B-side: "Dareka ga Nageta Ball"; "Hito Natsu no Hankouki"; "Seikaku ga Warui Onna no Ko"; "Chewing Gum no Aji ga Naku Naru Made"; "Sailor Zombie"; "Oshiete Mommy"; "47 no Suteki na Machi e"
- Released: August 27, 2014
- Genre: J-pop
- Length: 4:06
- Label: You, Be Cool! / King
- Songwriter(s): Yasushi Akimoto (lyrics)

AKB48 singles chronology
"Labrador Retriever" (2014)	"Kokoro no Placard" (2014)	"Kibōteki Refrain" (2014)

Music video
- AKB48 "Kokoro no Placard" on YouTube

"Kokoro no Placard" (心のプラカード, Kokoro no Purakādo; "The Heart's Placard") is the 37th single by the Japanese idol group AKB48. It was released in Japan on August 27, 2014. It was the 5th best-selling single of the year in Japan, with 1,058,059 copies.

== 2014 general election ==
The lineup for the title track and supporting B-sides was determined by the results from the AKB48's 2014 general election. Mayu Watanabe of AKB48's Team B received the most votes and became the center, or headlining performer, for the single.

== Promotion and release ==
The single was released in five types: Type A (two versions: regular and limited), Type K (regular and limited), Type B (regular and limited), Type D (regular and limited) and the Theater Edition.

The lyrics of the song were written by Yasushi Akimoto, the music composed by Yusuke Itagaki.

The full version of MV has not been released along with the single "Kibouteki Refrain", and due to the delay, was released a week later, on December 1.

== Reception ==
The single debuted at number one in the Oricon Daily Singles Chart with 871,923 copies sold on the first day. It reached number-one on the weekly Oricon Singles Chart.

== Track list ==
=== Type A ===
All lyrics are written by Yasushi Akimoto.

CD
No.	Title	Performing units	Length
1.	"Kokoro no Placard" (心のプラカード)
2.	"Kokoro no Placard 1half" (心のプラカード 1half)
3.	"Dareka ga Nageta Ball" (誰かが投げたボール)	Under Girls (アンダーガールズ)
4.	"Hito Natsu no Hankouki" (ひと夏の反抗期)	Next Girls (ネクストガールズ)
5.	"Kokoro no Placard" (off vocal ver.)
6.	"Dareka ga Nageta Ball" (off vocal ver.)
7.	"Hito Natsu no Hankouki" (off vocal ver.)

DVD
No.	Title	Length
1.	"Kokoro no Placard (music video)"
2.	"Dareka ga Nageta Ball (music video)"
3.	"Hito Natsu no Hankouki (music video)"
4.	"Kokoro no Placard Dance Tutorial"

=== Type B ===
All lyrics are written by Yasushi Akimoto.

CD
No.	Title	Performing units	Length
1.	"Kokoro no Placard" (心のプラカード)
2.	"Kokoro no Placard 1half" (心のプラカード 1half)
3.	"Dareka ga Nageta Ball" (誰かが投げたボール)	Under Girls (アンダーガールズ)
4.	"Seikaku ga Warui Onna no Ko" (性格が悪い女の子)	Future Girls (フューチャーガールズ)
5.	"Kokoro no Placard" (off vocal ver.)
6.	"Dareka ga Nageta Ball" (off vocal ver.)
7.	"Seikaku ga Warui Onna no Ko" (off vocal ver.)

DVD
No.	Title	Length
1.	"Kokoro no Placard (music video)"
2.	"Dareka ga Nageta Ball (music video)"
3.	"Seikaku ga Warui Onna no Ko (music video)"
4.	"Kokoro no Placard Dance Tutorial"

=== Type C ===
All lyrics are written by Yasushi Akimoto.

CD
No.	Title	Performing units	Length
1.	"Kokoro no Placard" (心のプラカード)
2.	"Kokoro no Placard 1half" (心のプラカード 1half)
3.	"Dareka ga Nageta Ball" (誰かが投げたボール)	Under Girls (アンダーガールズ)
4.	"Chewing Gum no Aji ga Naku Naru Made" (チューインガムの味がなくなるまで)	Upcoming Girls (アップカミングガールズ)
5.	"Kokoro no Placard" (off vocal ver.)
6.	"Dareka ga Nageta Ball" (off vocal ver.)
7.	"Chewing Gum no Aji ga Naku Naru Made" (off vocal ver.)

DVD
No.	Title	Length
1.	"Kokoro no Placard (music video)"
2.	"Dareka ga Nageta Ball (music video)"
3.	"Chewing Gum no Aji ga Naku Naru Made (music video)"
4.	"Kokoro no Placard Dance Tutorial"

=== Type D ===
All lyrics are written by Yasushi Akimoto.

CD
No.	Title	Performing units	Length
1.	"Kokoro no Placard" (心のプラカード)
2.	"Kokoro no Placard 1half" (心のプラカード 1half)
3.	"Sailor Zombie" (セーラーゾンビ)	Milk Planet
4.	"Oshiete Mommy" (教えてMommy)
5.	"Kokoro no Placard" (off vocal ver.)
6.	"Sailor Zombie" (off vocal ver.)
7.	"Oshiete Mommy" (off vocal ver.)

DVD
No.	Title	Length
1.	"Kokoro no Placard (music video)"
2.	"Sailor Zombie (music video)"
3.	"Oshiete Mommy (music video)"
4.	"Kokoro no Placard Dance Tutorial"

=== Theater edition ===
All lyrics are written by Yasushi Akimoto.

CD
No.	Title	Performing units	Length
1.	"Kokoro no Placard" (心のプラカード)
2.	"Dareka ga Nageta Ball" (誰かが投げたボール)	Under Girls (アンダーガールズ)
3.	"47 no Suteki na Machi e" (47の素敵な街へ)	Team 8
4.	"Kokoro no Placard 1half" (心のプラカード 1half)
5.	"Kokoro no Placard" (off vocal ver.)
6.	"Dareka ga Nageta Ball" (off vocal ver.)
7.	"47 no Suteki na Machi e" (off vocal ver.)

== Personnel ==
=== "Kokoro no Placard" ===
The lineup for the title track consists of the top 16 members from AKB48's 2014 general election. The center performer for the track is Mayu Watanabe

- AKB48 Team A: Rina Kawaei, Haruna Kojima, Haruka Shimazaki, Minami Takahashi
- AKB48 Team K: Yui Yokoyama
- AKB48 Team B: Yuki Kashiwagi, Mayu Watanabe
- SKE48 Team S: Jurina Matsui
- SKE48 Team E: Aya Shibata, Akari Suda, Rena Matsui
- NMB48 Team N: Sayaka Yamamoto
- HKT48 Team H: Rino Sashihara
- HKT48 Team KIV: Sakura Miyawaki
- SNH48 Team SII: Sae Miyazawa
- Nogizaka46: Rina Ikoma

=== "Dareka ga Nageta Ball" ===
Performed by Undergirls, which consist of members who ranked 17 to 32 in AKB48's 2014 general election.

- AKB48 Team A: Anna Iriyama, Tomu Muto
- AKB48 Team K: Rie Kitahara
- AKB48 Team B: Aki Takajo, Juri Takahashi
- AKB48 Team 4: Rena Kato, Yuria Kizaki, Minami Minegishi
- SKE48 Team S: Masana Oya
- SKE48 Team KII: Akane Takayanagi
- SKE48 Kenkyusei: Kaori Matsumura
- Team M: Nana Yamada
- Team BII: Miyuki Watanabe
- Team H: Haruka Kodama
- Team KIV: Mio Tomonaga, Madoka Moriyasu

=== "Hito Natsu no Hankouki" ===
Performed by Next Girls, which consist of members who ranked 33 to 48 in AKB48's 2014 general election.

- AKB48 Team K: Mako Kojima, Yuka Tano
- AKB48 Team 4: Yukari Sasaki
- SKE48 Team S: Haruka Futamura
- SKE48 Team KII: Yukiko Kinoshita, Airi Furukawa
- SKE48 Team E: Kyoka Isohara, Tsugumi Iwanaga
- Team M: Miru Shiroma, Reina Fujie, Fuuko Yagura
- Team BII: Ayaka Umeda
- Team H: Chihiro Anai, Meru Tashima
- Team KIV: Aika Ota, Aoi Motomura

=== "Seikaku ga Warui Onna no Ko" ===
Performed by Future Girls, which consist of members who ranked 49 to 64 in AKB48's 2014 general election.

- AKB48 Team K - Haruka Ishida, Misaki Iwasa
- AKB48 Team B - Natsuki Uchiyama, Asuka Kuramochi
- AKB48 Team 4 - Nana Okada, Miki Nishino
- SKE48 Team KII - Mina Oba, Nao Furuhata, Yamada Mizuho
- SKE48 Team E - Kanon Kimoto
- NMB48 Team N - Riho Kotani, Kei Jonishi
- NMB48 Team BII - Miori Ichikawa, Shu Yabushita
- HKT48 Team H - Riko Sakaguchi, Natsumi Matsuoka
- Center - Misaki Iwasa

=== "Chewing Gum no Aji ga Naku Naru Made" ===
Performed by Upcoming Girls, which consist of members who ranked 65 to 80 in AKB48's 2014 general election.

== JKT48 Version ==
"Kokoro no Placard -Papan Penanda Isi Hati-"

Single by JKT48

from the album JKT48 Festival Greatest Hits
- B-side: "Iiwake Maybe" "Kurumi to Dialogue" "Lucky Seven" "Message on a Placard"
- Released: 27 August 2014
- Recorded: 2014
- Genre: Pop; J-Pop
- Length: 4:43
- Label: Hits Record; JKT48 Project
- Songwriter(s): Yasushi Akimoto; Shintaro Ito; Yo Keigo; Hiroshi Uesugi
- Producer(s): Yasushi Akimoto

JKT48 singles chronology
"Gingham Check" (2014)	"Kokoro no Placard -Papan Penanda Isi Hati-" (2014)	"Kaze wa Fuiteiru -Angin Sedang Berhembus-" (2014)

JKT48 released their 7th single Papan Penanda Isi Hati -Message on a Placard- on 27 August 2014 with Shania Junianatha as this single's center. This CD (JKT48 Theater and Rakuten version) has tickets to Pensi JKT48 (Art Show).

=== Track listing ===
The single has three versions: Regular Edition distributed by CD Shops (CD+DVD), Regular Edition distributed by JKT48 Theater and Rakuten (CD+DVD), and Theater Edition (CD only).

==== Regular edition ====
Digital download – EP
No.	Title	Length
1.	"Papan Penanda isi Hati"	4:04
2.	"Dialog Kenang Kenari"	3:21
3.	"Lucky Seven"	3:41
4.	"Alasan Maybe - Iwake Maybe"	4:09
5.	"Message no Placard"	4:02

CD
No.	Title	Length
1.	"Kokoro no Placard" (Papan Penanda Isi Hati)
2.	"Kurumi to Dialogue" (Dialog dengan Kenari)
3.	"Lucky Seven"
4.	"Iiwake Maybe" (Alasanku Maybe)
5.	"Kokoro no Placard -English Ver.-" (Papan Penanda Isi Hati -English Ver.-)

DVD
No.	Title	Length
1.	"Papan Penanda Isi Hati Music Video"
2.	"Papan Penanda Isi Hati Behind the Scenes"

Bonus

- Photopack
- PENSI JKT48 Ticket (only on ones distributed by JKT48 Theater and Rakuten)

==== Theater edition ====
CD
No.	Title	Length
1.	"Kokoro no Placard" (Papan Penanda Isi Hati)
2.	"Kurumi to Dialogue" (Dialog dengan Kenari)
3.	"Lucky Seven"
4.	"Iiwake Maybe" (Alasanku Maybe)

Bonus

- JKT48 Trump Card
- Handshake ticket

=== Personnel ===
- Center: Shania Junianatha
- Team J: Beby Chaesara Anadila, Devi Kinal Putri, Haruka Nakagawa, Jessica Vania, Jessica Veranda, Melody Nurramdhani Laksani, Nabilah Ratna Ayu Azalia, Rezky Wiranti Dhike, Thalia Ivanka Elizabeth
- Team KIII: Cindy Yuvia, Ratu Vienny Fitrilya, Rina Chikano, Riskha Fairunissa, Shinta Naomi, Thalia

== Charts ==
Chart (2014)	Peak position
Billboard Japan Hot 100	1
Oricon Daily Singles Chart	1
Oricon Weekly Singles Chart	1
