= Muishiki no Iro =

Single by SKE48
- Released: January 10, 2018 (Japan)
- Genre: J-Pop
- Length: 4:30
- Label: Avex Group Holdings
- Songwriter(s): Yasushi Akimoto

SKE48 singles chronology
| "Igai ni Mango" (2017) | "Muishiki no Iro" (2018) | "Ikinari Punch Line" (2018) |

Short version music video on YouTube
- Muishiki no Iro (Full ver.)

Muishiki no Iro (無意識の色 Unconscious Color) is the 22nd single from Japanese idol girl group SKE48, being released on January 10, 2018. The song reached number one on the Oricon Weekly Singles Chart, selling 278,892 copies in the first week. It also reached number one on the Billboard Japan Hot 100. This is also the first single since "1!2!3!4! YOROSHIKU!" to release a full MV until "Stand by You".

This is the first single since "12gatsu no Kangaroo" to not have a graduation-themed B-side. Also, for this single, Love Crescendo added 4 new members (Isshiki Rena, Inoue Ruka, Nomura Miyo, and Matsumoto Chikako) to their sub-unit; they now have 11 members.

== Track listing ==
=== Type A ===
CD+DVD: AVCD-83952/B, AVCD-83956/B
| No. | Title | Length |
|---|---|---|
| 1. | "Muishiki no Iro" |
| 2. | "Hanshateki Through (Love Crescendo)" |
| 3. | "We're Growing Up (Aichi Toyota Senbatsu)" |
| 4. | "Muishiki no Iro (off vocal)" |
| 5. | "Hanshateki Through (off vocal)" |
| 6. | "We're Growing Up (off vocal)" |

=== Type B ===
CD+DVD: AVCD-83953/B, CD+DVD: AVCD-83957/B
| No. | Title | Length |
|---|---|---|
| 1. | "Muishiki no Iro" |
| 2. | "Yoake no Coyote (Sagami Chain Senbatsu)" |
| 3. | "We're Growing Up (Aichi Toyota Senbatsu)" |
| 4. | "Muishiki no Iro (off vocal)" |
| 5. | "Yoake no Coyote (off vocal)" |
| 6. | "We're Growing Up (off vocal)" |

=== Type C ===
CD+DVD: AVCD-83954/B, CD+DVD: AVCD-83958/B
| No. | Title | Length |
|---|---|---|
| 1. | "Muishiki no Iro" |
| 2. | "Bocchi de Skip (Namae Yobaretai)" |
| 3. | "We're Growing Up (Aichi Toyota Senbatsu)" |
| 4. | "Muishiki no Iro (off vocal)" |
| 5. | "Bocchi de Skip (off vocal)" |
| 6. | "We're Growing Up (off vocal)" |

=== Type D ===
CD+DVD: AVCD-83955/B, CD+DVD: AVCD-83959/B
| No. | Title | Length |
|---|---|---|
| 1. | "Muishiki no Iro" |
| 2. | "Sawaranu Romance (Sakura Love Letter 32)" |
| 3. | "We're Growing Up (Aichi Toyota Senbatsu)" |
| 4. | "Muishiki no Iro (off vocal)" |
| 5. | "Sawaranu Romance (off vocal)" |
| 6. | "We're Growing Up (off vocal)" |

=== Theater version ===
CD: AVC1-83960
| No. | Title | Length |
|---|---|---|
| 1. | "Muishiki no Iro" |
| 2. | "Because Docchitsukazu (Kosanger 7)" |
| 3. | "We're Growing Up (Aichi Toyota Senbatsu)" |
| 4. | "SKE48 22nd Single Medley" |
| 5. | "Muishiki no Iro (off vocal)" |
| 6. | "Because Docchitsukazu (off vocal)" |
| 7. | "We're Growing Up (off vocal) (off vocal)" |

NOTE: Theater version doesn't include a Bonus DVD

== Personnel ==
=== "Muishiki no Iro (Senbatsu)" ===
The performers of the main single are:

- Team S: Kitagawa Ryoha, Jurina Matsui
- Team KII: Ego Yuna, Oba Mina, Obata Yuna, Kitano Ruka, Souda Sarina, Takayanagi Akane, Takeuchi Saki, Hidaka Yuzuki, Furuhata Nao
- Team E: Kamata Natsuki, Kumazaki Haruka, Goto Rara, Sugawara Maya, Suda Akari

=== "Hanshateki Through" ===
"Hanshateki Through" was performed by Love Crescendo, consisting of:

- Team S: Isshiki Rena, Inoue Ruka, Kitagawa Ryoha, Nomura Miyo, Matsumoto Chikako, Matsui Jurina
- Team KII: Ego Yuna, Obata Yuna
- Team E: Kumazaki Haruka, Goto Rara, Sugawara Maya

=== "Yoake no Coyote" ===
"Yoake no Coyote" was performed by the SKE48 grouping Sagami Chain Senbatsu, consisting of:

- Team S: Kitagawa Ryoha, Matsui Jurina
- Team KII: Ego Yuna, Oba Mina, Obata Yuna, Souda Sarina, Takayanagi Akane, Furuhata Nao, Yahagi Yukina
- Team E: Kumazaki Haruka, Goto Rara, Suda Akari

=== "Bocchi de Skip" ===
"Bocchi de Skip" was performed by the SKE48 grouping Namae Yobaretai, consisting of:

- Team KII: Aoki Shiori, Uchiyama Mikoto, Kitano Ruka, Hidaka Yuzuki
- Team E: Ichino Narumi, Saito Makiko

=== "Sawaranu Romance" ===
"Sawaranu Romance" was performed by the SKE48 grouping Sakura Love Letter 32, consisting of:

- Team S: Kamimura Ayuka, Kitagawa Yoshino, Sugiyama Aika, Nojima Kano, Machi Otoha
- Team KII: Arai Yuki, Ota Ayaka, Kataoka Narumi, Shirai Kotono, Takatsuka Natsuki, Mizuno Airi, Yahagi Yukina
- Team E: Aikawa Honoka, Asai Yuka, Ida Reona, Sato Kaho, Suenaga Oka, Takahata Yuki, Fukushi Nao
- Kenkyuusei: Atsumi Ayaha, Ishikawa Saki, Ishiguro Yuzuki, Oshiba Rinka, Okada Miku, Kurashima Ami, Sakamoto Marin, Shirayuki Kohaku, Nakamura Izumi, Nonogaki Miki, Fukai Negai, Morihira Riko, Wada Aina

=== "We're Growing Up" ===
"We're Growing Up" was performed by the SKE48 grouping Aichi Toyota Senbatsu, consisting of:

- Team S: Kitagawa Ryoha, Matsui Jurina
- Team KII: Ego Yuna, Oba Mina, Obata Yuna, Souda Sarina, Takayanagi Akane, Furuhata Nao
- Team E: Kumazaki Haruka, Goto Rara, Sugawara Maya, Suda Akari

=== "Because Docchitsukazu" ===
"Because Docchitsukazu" was performed by the SKE48 grouping Kosanger 7, consisting of:

- Team S: Inuzuka Asana, Tsuzuki Rika, Yamauchi Suzuran, Yamada Juna
- Team KII: Takagi Yumana, Matsumura Kaori
- Team E: Tani Marika

== Release history ==
| Region | Date | Format | Label |
|---|---|---|---|
| Japan | January 10, 2018 | CD; digital download; streaming | Avex |
| South Korea | July 1, 2018 | digital download; streaming | SM; iriver |
