= Tsuyoki Mono yo =

Single by SKE48

from the album Kono Hi no Chime o Wasurenai
- Released: August 5, 2009 (Japan)
- Genre: J-pop
- Label: Lantis; LACM-4638
- Songwriter: Yasushi Akimoto (lyrics)
- Producer: Yasushi Akimoto

SKE48 singles chronology
"Tsuyoki Mono yo" (2009)	"Aozora Kataomoi" (2010)

Music video
- Tsuyoki Monoyo

"Tsuyoki Mono yo" (強き者よ; Dear Mighties) is the first single by Japanese girl group SKE48, their first (and also last) under Lantis. It is an ending theme for Shin Mazinger Shougeki! Z Hen. It reached the 5th place on the weekly Oricon Singles Chart and, as of September 21, 2009 (issue date), has sold 27,295 copies.

This was the only single from SKE48 released by Lantis.

== Members ==
- Team S: Aki Deguchi, Kanako Hiramatsu, Rikako Hirata, Mizuki Kuwabara, Jurina Matsui, Rena Matsui, Yui Matsushita, Sayuki Mori, Yuka Nakanishi, Haruka Ono, Masana Oya, Rina Shinkai, Shiori Takada, Kumi Yagami, Moe Yamashita, Tsukina Takai
