= Sawako Hata =

Japanese singer and voice actress (born 1988)

Sawako Hata 秦 佐和子
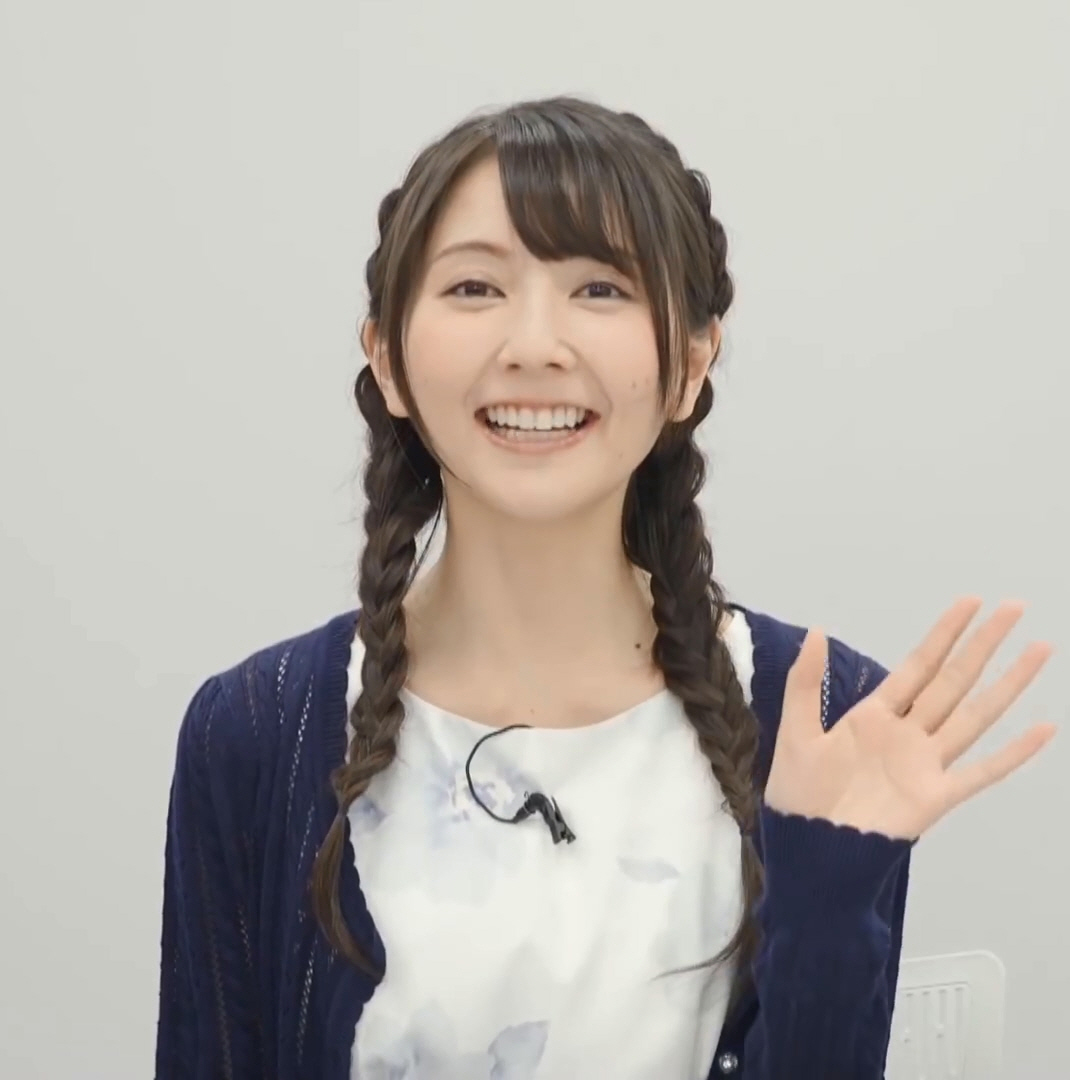
- Hata in 2017

Background information
- Born: September 14, 1988 (age 38)
- Origin: Osaka, Japan
- Genre: J-pop
- Occupations: Singer, idol, voice actress
- Years active: 2010–present
- Labels: Nippon Crown; Defstar Records

Sawako Hata (秦 佐和子, Hata Sawako; born September 14, 1988 in Osaka) is a Japanese singer and voice actress. She was a member of the Japanese girl idol group SKE48, which she joined as a third-generation trainee in November 2009, before being promoted to Team KII. She graduated from the group on March 29, 2013. Hata is currently a member of Pastel Palettes, a unit of the media franchise BanG Dream!.

== Career ==
In 2012, Hata along with six other AKB48 group members, one fellow SKE48 group member, and one NMB48 group member joined the unit No Name. No Name released their debut single, "Kibō ni Tsuite", as the title song for the anime AKB0048. The selected members became the starring voice actresses for the anime, in which Hata voiced Suzuko Kanzaki.

At the AKB48 27th Single Senbatsu Election in 2012, Hata placed 25. From April 2013, following her graduation from SKE48, she began attending a voice acting school. She is currently affiliated with Mausu Promotion.

In 2016, Hata voiced in the Shimajiro film Shimajiro in Bookland as Kurorin. In 2017, Hata joined the media franchise BanG Dream!; she portrays Eve Wakamiya, keyboardist for the idol band Pastel Palettes.

== Appearances ==
=== Singles ===
==== SKE48 ====
- "Pareo wa Emerald" (July 27, 2011)
- "Okey Dokey" (November 11, 2011)
- "Kataomoi Finally" (January 25, 2012)
- "Aishite-love-ru!" (May 16, 2012)
- "Kiss datte Hidarikiki" (September 19, 2012)
- "Choco no Dorei" (January 30, 2013)

==== AKB48 ====
===== B-side(s) =====
- "Flying Get" (December 7, 2011)

"Dakishimecha ikenai" (抱きしめちゃいけない)

- "Gingham Check"

"Nante Bohemian" (なんてボヘミアン)

- "Eien Pressure" (December 5, 2012)

"Tsuyogari Dokei" (強がり時計)

=== Video games ===
- Azur Lane —Fiji, Poltava
- BanG Dream! Girls Band Party! as Eve Wakamiya
- Caravan Stories as Almimi
- Fire Emblem: Three Houses as Marianne von Edmund
- Revived Witch as La Crima

=== Films ===
- Shimajiro in Bookland as Kurorin.
