= Banzai Venus =

"Banzai Venus (バンザイVENUS)"

Single by SKE48

from the album Kono Hi no Chime o Wasurenai
- Released: March 9, 2011 (Japan)
- Genre: J-pop
- Label: Crown Gold; CD: SKE-10004; DualDisc: CRCP-10261
- Songwriter: Yasushi Akimoto (lyrics)
- Producer: Yasushi Akimoto

SKE48 singles chronology
"1! 2! 3! 4! Yoroshiku!" (2010)	"Banzai Venus (バンザイVENUS)" (2011)	"Pareo wa Emerald" (2011)

Banzai Venus (バンザイVENUS) is the 5th single by Japanese girl group SKE48. It was their last release on Crown Gold. It debuted at number-one on the weekly Oricon Singles Chart and, as of February 13, 2012 (issue date), has sold 275,189 copies.

Starting from this single, only short versions are featured on SKE48 official channel, due to restrictions required by Avex.

== Members ==
=== "Banzai Venus" ===
- Team S: Masana Ōya, Rikako Hirata, Yuria Kizaki, Mizuki Kuwabara, Akari Suda, Kanako Hirmatsu, Shiori Takada, Jurina Matsui, Rena Matsui, Kumi Yagami
- Team KII: Anna Ishida, Shiori Ogiso, Airi Furukawa, Akane Takayanagi, Manatsu Mukaida
- Team E: Kanon Kimoto

=== "Ai no Kazu" ===
- Team KII: Ririna Akaeda, Riho Abiru, Anna Ishida, Shiori Ogiso, Tomoko Kato, Risako Goto, Seira Sato, Mieko Sato, Akane Takayanagi, Sawako Hata, Airi Furukawa, Rina Matsumoto, Manatsu Muakida, Miki Yakata, Reika Yamada, Tomoka Wakabayashi

=== "Dareka no Sei ni wa Shinai" ===
Akagumi

- Team S: Rumi Kato, Yukiko Kinoshita, Aki Deguchi, Rena Matsui
- Team KII: Seira Sato, Sawako Hata, Miki Yakata
- Team E: Kasumi Ueno, Madoka Umemoto, Shiori Kaneko, Minami Hara, Yukari Yamashita

=== "Sotsugyoushiki no Wasuremono" ===
Shirogumi

- Team S: Haruka Ono, Yuka Nakanishi, Jurina Matsui
- Team KII: Riho Abiru, Tomoko Kato, Risako Goto, Mieko Sato, Rina Matsumoto, Reika Yamada, Tomoka Wakabayashi
- Team E: Erika Yamada, Yuka Nakamura
