= Aozora Kataomoi =

"Aozora Kataomoi (青空片想い)"

Single by SKE48

from the album Kono Hi no Chime o Wasurenai
- Released: March 24, 2010 (Japan)
- Genre: J-pop
- Label: Crown Gold; CD: SKE-10001; DualDisc: CRCP-10244
- Songwriter: Yasushi Akimoto (lyrics)
- Producer: Yasushi Akimoto

SKE48 singles chronology
"Tsuyoki Mono Yo" (2009)	"Aozora Kataomoi (青空片想い)" (2010)	"Gomen ne, Summer" (2010)

Aozora Kataomoi (青空片想い) is the 2nd single by Japanese girl group SKE48, their first under the Crown Gold label. It reached the 3rd place on the weekly Oricon Singles Chart and, as of July 5, 2010 (issue date), has sold 51,180 copies.

== Members ==
=== "Aozora Kataomoi" ===
- Team S: Jurina Matsui, Rena Matsui, Kumi Yagami, Yukiko Kinoshita
- Team KII: Shiori Ogiso, Akane Takayanagi, Manatsu Mukaida

=== "Bungee Sengen" ===
Team BLT

- Team S: Mizuki Kuwabara, Haruka Ono, Rikako Hirata, Masana Oya, Shiori Takada, Akari Suda, Kanako Hiramatsu
- Team KII: Airi Furukawa, Anna Ishida, Rina Matsumoto
- Kenkyuusei: Erika Yamada
