= Aishite-love-ru! =

Single by SKE48
- Released: May 16, 2012 (Japan)
- Genre: J-pop
- Label: Avex Trax; Type A: AVCD-48416; Type B: AVCD-48417; Type C: AVCD-48418; Theater: AVC1-48419
- Songwriter: Yasushi Akimoto (lyrics)
- Producer: Yasushi Akimoto

SKE48 singles chronology
"Kataomoi Finally" (2012)	"Aishite-love-ru!" (2012)	"Kiss datte Hidarikiki" (2012)

"Aishite-love-ru!" or "Aishiteraburu!" (アイシテラブル!) is the ninth single by Japanese girl group SKE48. It was the tenth best-selling single of 2012 in Japan, with 581,612 copies.

== Members ==
=== "Aishite-love-ru!" ===
- Team S: Masana Ōya, Yuria Kizaki, Akari Suda, Jurina Matsui, Rena Matsui, Kumi Yagami
- Team KII: Shiori Ogiso, Akane Takayanagi, Sawako Hata, Airi Furukawa, Rina Matsumoto, Manatsu Mukaida, Anna Ishida, Miki Yakata
- Team E: Shiori Kaneko, Kanon Kimoto

=== "Me ga Itai Kurai Hareta Sora" ===
- Kenkyuusei: Narumi Ichino, Tsugumi Iwanaga, Yuuna Ego, Risa Ogino, Arisa Oowaki, Nanako Suga, Sayaka Niidol, Miki Hioki, Mizuki Fujimoto, Haruka Futamura, Nao Furuhata, Ami Miyamae, Mizuho Yamada

=== "Aun no Kiss" ===
- Team S: Mizuki Kuwabara, Yuka Nakanishi, Rikako Hirata
- Team KII: Riho Abiru, Mieko Sato, Risako Goto
- Team E: Kyoka Isohara, Ami Kobayashi, Aya Shibata
- Kenkyuusei: Makiko Saito, Sayaka Niidoi, Kaori Matsumura

=== "Nante Ginga wa Arui no Darou" ===
- Team S: Rena Matsui, Rumi Kato, Aki Deguchi, Yukiko Kinoshita, Shiori Takada
- Team KII: Seira Sato
- Team E: Kasumi Ueno, Madoka Umemoto, Minami Hara, Yukari Yamashita
- Kenkyuusei: Momona Kito, Nanako Suga

=== "Halation" ===
- Team S: Aki Deguchi
- Team KII: Anna Ishida, Airi Furukawa, Tomoka Wakabayashi, Mieko Sato
- Team E: Minami Hara, Yukari Yamashita
- Kenkyuusei: Nao Furuhata

== Oricon charts ==
Release	Oricon Singles Chart	Peak position	Debut sales (copies)	Sales total (copies)
May 16, 2012	Daily Chart	1	98,952	581,049
May 16, 2012	Weekly Chart	1	472,327	581,049
May 16, 2012	Monthly Chart	3	538,394	581,049
