= Okey Dokey (SKE48 song) =

Single by SKE48

from the album Kono Hi no Chime o Wasurenai
- Released: November 9, 2011
- Label: Avex Trax; Type A: AVCD-48227; Type B: AVCD-48228; Type C: AVCD-48229; Theater: AVC1-48230
- Songwriter: Yasushi Akimoto
- Producer: Yasushi Akimoto

SKE48 singles chronology
"Pareo wa Emerald" (2011)	"Okey Dokey" (2011)	"Kataomoi Finally" (2012)

Music video
- "Okey Dokey" (preview) on YouTube

"Okey Dokey" (オキドキ, Oki Doki) also "Oki Doki" and "Okie Dokie", is the 7th single by Japanese girl group SKE48. It was released on November 9, 2011. It debuted at number-one on the weekly Oricon Singles Chart and, as of April 30, 2012 (issue date), has sold 474,970 copies.

== Track listing ==
=== Type A ===
CD
No.	Title	Artist(s)	Length
1.	"Okey Dokey" (オキドキ)
2.	"Bazooka Hō Hassha!" (バズーカ砲発射!)	Shirogumi (白組)
3.	"Hatsukoi no Fumikiri" (初恋の踏切)
4.	"Okey Dokey (Off Vocal Ver.)" (オキドキ off vocal ver.)
5.	"Bazooka Hō Hassha! (Off Vocal Ver.)" (バズーカ砲発射! off vocal ver.)
6.	"Hatsukoi no Fumikiri (Off Vocal Ver.)" (初恋の踏切 off vocal ver.)

DVD
No.	Title	Length
1.	"Okey Dokey music video" (オキドキ Music Video)
2.	"Bazooka Hō Hassha! music video" (バズーカ砲発射! Music Video)
3.	"Tokuten eizō 'Gachi! Oyasumi' (Shirogumi) Self Video" (特典映像「ガチ！おやすみ」（白組）self video)

=== Type B ===
CD
No.	Title	Artist(s)	Length
1.	"Okey Dokey" (オキドキ)
2.	"Hohoemi no Positive Thinking" (微笑のポジティブシンキング)	Akagumi (紅組)
3.	"Hatsukoi no Fumikiri" (初恋の踏切)
4.	"Okey Dokey (Off Vocal Ver.)" (オキドキ off vocal ver.)
5.	"Hohoemi no Positive Thinking (Off Vocal Ver.)" (微笑のポジティブシンキング off vocal ver.)
6.	"Hatsukoi no Fumikiri (Off Vocal Ver.)" (初恋の踏切 off vocal ver.)

DVD
No.	Title	Length
1.	"Okey Dokey music video" (オキドキ Music Video)
2.	"Hohoemi no Positive Thinking music video" (微笑のポジティブシンキング Music Video)
3.	"Tokuten eizō 'Gachi! Oyasumi' (Akagumi) Self Video" (特典映像「ガチ！おやすみ」（紅組）self video)

=== Type C ===
CD
No.	Title	Artist(s)	Length
1.	"Okey Dokey" (オキドキ)
2.	"Utaōyo, Bokutachi no Kōka" (歌おうよ、僕たちの校歌)	Selection 8 (セレクション8)
3.	"Hatsukoi no Fumikiri" (初恋の踏切)
4.	"Okey Dokey (Off Vocal Ver.)" (オキドキ off vocal ver.)
5.	"Utaōyo, Bokutachi no Kōka (Off Vocal Ver.)" (歌おうよ、僕たちの校歌 off vocal ver.)
6.	"Hatsukoi no Fumikiri (Off Vocal Ver.)" (初恋の踏切 off vocal ver.)

DVD
No.	Title	Length
1.	"Okey Dokey music video" (オキドキ Music Video)
2.	"Tokuten eizō I 'Gachi! Oyasumi' (32 Nin) Self Video" (特典映像I「ガチ！おやすみ」（32人）self video)
3.	"Tokuten eizō II 'SKE48 7th Single Senbatsu Happyō' Documentary Movie" (特典映像II「SKE48 7thシングル選抜発表」documentary movie)
4.	"Tokuten eizō III 'AKB48 24th Single Janken Taikai (Micchaku! SKE48)' Digest Movie" (特典映像III「AKB48 24thシングル選抜 じゃんけん大会～密着!SKE48～」digest movie)

=== Theater Edition ===
CD
No.	Title	Artist(s)	Length
1.	"Okey Dokey" (オキドキ)
2.	"Bazooka Hō Hassha!" (バズーカ砲発射!)	Shirogumi (白組)
3.	"Hohoemi no Positive Thinking" (微笑みのポジティブシンキング)	Akagumi (紅組)
4.	"SKE48 7th Single Medley"
5.	"Okey Dokey (Off Vocal Ver.)" (オキドキ off vocal ver.)
6.	"Bazooka Hō Hassha! (Off Vocal Ver.)" (バズーカ砲発射! off vocal ver.)
7.	"Hohoemi no Positive Thinking (Off Vocal Ver.)" (微笑みのポジティブシンキング off vocal ver.)

== Members ==
=== "Okey Dokey" ===
- Team S: Masana Ōya, Haruka Ono, Yuria Kizaki, Mizuki Kuwabara, Akari Suda, Kanako Hiramatsu, Jurina Matsui, Rena Matsui, Kumi Yagami, Yukiko Kinoshita
- Team KII: Shiori Ogiso, Akane Takayanagi, Sawako Hata
- Team E: Shiori Kaneko, Kanon Kimoto, Minami Hara

=== "Hatsukoi no Fumikiri" ===
- All Members

=== "Bazooka Hō Hassha!" ===
Shirogumi

- Team S: Yūka Nakanishi, Rikako Hirata, Jurina Matsui
- Team KII: Riho Abiru, Anna Ishida, Mieko Satō, Rina Matsumoto, Tomoka Wakabayashi
- Team E: Kyōka Isohara, Ami Kobayashi, Aya Shibata
- Kenkyūsei: Makiko Saitō

=== "Hohoemi no Positive Thinking" ===
Akagumi

- Team S: Rumi Katō, Shiori Takada, Aki Deguchi, Rena Matsui
- Team KII: Seira Satō, Airi Furukawa, Manatsu Mukaida, Miki Yakata
- Team E: Kasumi Ueno, Madoka Umemoto, Yukari Yamashita
- Kenkyūsei: Momona Kitō

=== "Utaōyo, Bokutachi no Kōka" ===
Selection 8

- Team S: Masana Ōya, Haruka Ono, Yuria Kizaki, Jurina Matsui, Rena Matsui, Kumi Yagami
- Team KII: Shiori Ogiso, Akane Takayanagi
- Team E: Kanon Kimoto

== Oricon Charts ==
Release	Oricon Singles Chart	Peak position	Debut sales (copies)	Sales total (copies)
November 9, 2011	Daily Chart	1	283,011	474,970
November 9, 2011	Weekly Chart	1	382,802	474,970
November 9, 2011	Monthly Chart	2	421,366	474,970
