= Kataomoi Finally =

Single by SKE48

from the album Kono Hi no Chime o Wasurenai
- Released: January 25, 2012
- Genre: J-Pop
- Label: Avex Trax; Type A: AVCD-48342; Type B: AVCD-48343; Type C: AVCD-48344; Theater: AVC1-48345
- Songwriter(s): Yasushi Akimoto
- Producer(s): Yasushi Akimoto

SKE48 singles chronology
"Okey Dokey" (2011)	"Kataomoi Finally" (2012)	"Ai Shite Love Ru!" (2012)

Kataomoi Finally (片想いFinally) is a single by SKE48. It reached number 1 at the Oricon singles charts.

== Track listing ==
=== Type A ===
CD
No.	Title	Artist(s)	Length
1.	"Kataomoi Finally" (片想いFinally)
2.	"Hanikami Lollipop" (はにかみロリーポップ)	Shirogumi (白組)
3.	"Kyō made no Koto, Korekara no koto" (今日までのこと、これからのこと)
4.	"Kataomoi Finally (Off Vocal Ver.)" (片想いFinally off vocal ver.)
5.	"Hanikami Lollipop (Off Vocal Ver.)" (はにかみロリーポップ off vocal ver.)
6.	"Kyō made no Koto, Korekara no koto (Off Vocal Ver.)" (今日までのこと、これからのこと off vocal ver.)

DVD
No.	Title	Length
1.	"Kataomoi Finally music video" (片想いFinally Music Video)
2.	"Hanikami Lollipop music video" (はにかみロリーポップ Music Video)
3.	"Tokuten eizō 'SKE48 Kōhaku Taikō Maruhi Gē Nintē Taikai Part1'" (特典映像「SKE48紅白対抗 マル秘芸認定大会 PART1」)

=== Type B ===
CD
No.	Title	Artist(s)	Length
1.	"Kataomoi Finally" (片想いFinally)
2.	"Koe ga Kasureru Kurai" (声がかすれるくらい)	Akagumi (紅組)
3.	"Kyō made no Koto, Korekara no koto" (今日までのこと、これからのこと)
4.	"Kataomoi Finally (Off Vocal Ver.)" (片想いFinally off vocal ver.)
5.	"Koe ga Kasureru Kurai (Off Vocal Ver.)" (声がかすれるくらい off vocal ver.)
6.	"Kyō made no Koto, Korekara no koto (Off Vocal Ver.)" (今日までのこと、これからのこと off vocal ver.)

DVD
No.	Title	Length
1.	"Kataomoi Finally music video" (片想いFinally Music Video)
2.	"Koe ga Kasureru Kurai music video" (声がかすれるくらい Music Video)
3.	"Tokuten eizō 'SKE48 Kōhaku Taikō Maruhi Gē Nintē Taikai Part2'" (特典映像「SKE48紅白対抗 マル秘芸認定大会 PART2」)

=== Type C ===
CD
No.	Title	Artist(s)	Length
1.	"Kataomoi Finally" (片想いFinally)
2.	"Kamoku na Tsuki" (寡黙な月)	Selection 8 (セレクション8)
3.	"Kyō made no Koto, Korekara no koto" (今日までのこと、これからのこと)
4.	"Kataomoi Finally (Off Vocal Ver.)" (片想いFinally off vocal ver.)
5.	"Kamoku na Tsuki (Off Vocal Ver.)" (寡黙な月 off vocal ver.)
6.	"Kyō made no Koto, Korekara no koto (Off Vocal Ver.)" (今日までのこと、これからのこと off vocal ver.)

DVD
No.	Title	Length
1.	"Kataomoi Finally music video" (片想いFinally Music Video)
2.	"Tokuten eizō I 'SKE48 Kōhaku Taikō Maruhi Gē Nintē Taikai'" (特典映像I「SKE48紅白対抗 マル秘芸認定大会」)
3.	"Tokuten eizō II 'KII Original Kōen e no Kiseki' Documentary Movie" (特典映像II「KIIオリジナル公演への軌跡」documentary movie)

=== Theater Edition ===
CD
No.	Title	Artist(s)	Length
1.	"Kataomoi Finally" (片想いFinally)
2.	"Hanikami Lollipop" (はにかみロリーポップ)	Shirogumi (白組)
3.	"Koe ga Kasureru Kurai" (声がかすれるくらい)	Akagumi (紅組)
4.	"SKE48 8th Single Medley"
5.	"Kataomoi Finally (Off Vocal Ver.)" (片想いFinally off vocal ver.)
6.	"Hanikami Lollipop (Off Vocal Ver.)" (はにかみロリーポップ off vocal ver.)
7.	"Koe ga Kasureru Kurai (Off Vocal Ver.)" (声がかすれるくらい off vocal ver.)

== Members ==
=== "Kataomoi Finally" ===
- Team S: Masana Ōya, Yuria Kizaki, Mizuki Kuwabara, Akari Suda, Kanako Hiramatsu, Jurina Matsui, Rena Matsui, Kumi Yagami
- Team KII: Shiori Ogiso, Akane Takayanagi, Sawako Hata, Airi Furukawa, Rina Matsumoto, Manatsu Mukaida
- Team E: Shiori Kaneko, Kanon Kimoto

=== "Kyō made no Koto, Korekara no koto" ===
- All Members

=== "Hanikami Lollipop" ===
Shirogumi

- Team S: Haruka Ono, Yūka Nakanishi, Rikako Hirata, Jurina Matsui
- Team KII: Riho Abiru, Anna Ishida, Risako Gotō, Tomoka Wakabayashi
- Team E: Kyōka Isohara, Aya Shibata, Erika Yamada
- Kenkyūsei: Makiko Saitō

=== "Koe ga Kasureru Kurai" ===
Akagumi

- Team S: Rumi Katō, Yukiko Kinoshita, Shiori Takada, Aki Deguchi, Rena Matsui
- Team KII: Seira Satō, Miki Yakata
- Team E: Kasumi Ueno, Madoka Umemoto, Minami Hara, Haruka Mano, Yukari Yamashita

=== "Kamoku na Tsuki" ===
Selection 8

- Team S: Yuria Kizaki, Jurina Matsui, Rena Matsui, Kumi Yagami
- Team KII: Anna Ishida, Shiori Ogiso, Akane Takayanagi
- Team E: Kanon Kimoto

== Oricon Charts ==
Release	Oricon Singles Chart	Peak position	Debut sales (copies)	Sales total (copies)
January 25, 2012	Daily Chart	1	285,467	592,947
January 25, 2012	Weekly Chart	1	495,809	592,947
January 25, 2012	Monthly Chart	1	528,480	592,947
