= Gomen ne, Summer =

"Gomen ne, Summer (ごめんね、SUMMER)"

Single by SKE48

from the album Kono Hi no Chime o Wasurenai
- Released: July 7, 2010 (Japan)
- Genre: J-pop
- Label: Crown Gold; CD: SKE-10002; DualDisc: CRCP-10255
- Songwriter: Yasushi Akimoto (lyrics)
- Producer: Yasushi Akimoto

SKE48 singles chronology
"Aozora Kataomoi" (2010)	"Gomen ne, Summer (ごめんね、SUMMER)" (2010)	"1! 2! 3! 4! Yoroshiku!" (2010)

Gomen ne, Summer (ごめんね、SUMMER) is the 3rd single by Japanese girl group SKE48. It reached the 3rd place on the weekly Oricon Singles Chart and, as of February 20, 2012 (issue date), has sold 96,049 copies.
