= Pareo wa Emerald =

2011 single by SKE48

"Pareo wa Emerald (パレオはエメラルド)"

Single by SKE48

from the album Kono Hi no Chime o Wasurenai
- Released: July 27, 2011 (Japan)
- Genre: J-pop
- Label: Avex Trax; Type A: AVCD-48127; Type B: AVCD-48128; Type C: AVCD-48129; Theater: AVC1-48130
- Songwriter: Yasushi Akimoto (lyrics)
- Producer: Yasushi Akimoto

SKE48 singles chronology
"Banzai Venus" (2011)	"Pareo wa Emerald (パレオはエメラルド)" (2011)	"Okey Dokey" (2011)

Pareo wa Emerald (パレオはエメラルド) is the 6th single by Japanese girl group SKE48, and its first under Avex Trax. It debuted at number-one on the weekly Oricon Singles Chart and, as of January 14, 2013 (issue date), has sold 480,916 copies.

Due to restrictions required by Avex, from this single, SKE48 does not release full versions of their music videos, even after the release of the next single (which usually take place through official channels of AKB48 and HKT48 on YouTube). The only exception is "2588 Days" solo single by Rena Matsui, by the time of her graduation, held in August 2015.

== Members ==
=== "Pareo wa Emerald" ===
- Team S: Masana Ōya, Yuria Kizaki, Yukiko Kinoshita, Mizuki Kuwabara, Akari Suda, Kanako Hirmatsu, Jurina Matsui, Rena Matsui, Kumi Yagami
- Team KII: Anna Ishida, Shiori Ogiso, Akane Takayanagi, Sawako Hata, Airi Furukawa, Manatsu Mukaida
- Team E: Kanon Kimoto

=== "Tokimeki no Ashiato" ===
Shirogumi

- Team S: Haruka Ono, Yuuka Nakanishi, Rikako Hirata, Jurina Matsui
- Team KII: Ririna Akaeda, Riho Abiru, Mieko Sato, Rina Matsumoto, Tomoka Wakabayashi
- Team E: Aya Shibata, Yuka Nakamura
- Kenkyuusei: Makiko Saito

=== "Papa wa Kirai" ===
Akagumi

- Team S: Rumi Kato, Shiori Takada, Rena Matsui
- Team KII: Seira Sato, Miki Yakata
- Team E: Kasumi Ueno, Madoka Umemoto, Shiori Kaneko, Mai Takeuchi, Minami Hara, Yukari Yamashita

=== "Tsumiki no Jikan" ===
All SKE48 members at the time of release

=== "Hanabi wa Owaranai" ===
Selection 8

- Team S: Yuria Kizaki, Jurina Matsui, Rena Matsui, Kumi Yagami
- Team KII: Shiori Ogiso, Akane Takayanagi, Manatsu Mukaida
- Team E: Kanon Kimoto

== JKT48 Version ==
"Pareo Adalah Emerald (Pareo Is Your Emerald) (パレオはエメラルド "Pareo Wa Emerald")"

Single by JKT48
- A-side: "Pareo wa Emerald (Pareo adalah Emerald) / Senbatsu"
- B-side: "Bara no Kajitsu (Buah Mawar) / Undergirls"; "Takane no Ringo (Apel Yang Ada Di Puncak) / Tim J"; "Escape / Tim KIII"; "Kinou Yori Motto Suki (Dibanding Kemarin Semakin Suka) / Tim T"; "Pareo is Your Emerald / Senbatsu" (hanya edisi reguler)
- Released: March 3, 2015
- Recorded: 2015; Indonesia
- Genre: Pop
- Label: Hits Records; JKT48 Project
- Songwriter: Yasushi Akimoto (lirik)
- Producer: Yasushi Akimoto

JKT48 singles chronology
"Angin Sedang Berhembus" (2014)	"Pareo Adalah Emerald (Pareo Is Your Emerald) (パレオはエメラルド "Pareo Wa Emerald")" (2015)	"Refrain Penuh Harapan" (2015)

Alternative cover

On March 27, 2015, JKT48 launched the group's 9th single called "Pareo wa Emerald" (Pareo adalah Emerald)

=== Promotion and release ===
This single has the voting tickets for JKT48's 10th single Senbatsu Sosenkyo.

=== Track listing ===
==== Regular edition ====
CD
No.	Title	Writer(s)	Artis	Length
1.	"Pareo wa Emerald" (Pareo adalah Emerald)	Yasushi Akimoto	Senbatsu
2.	"Bara No Kajitsu" (Buah Mawar)		Undergirls
3.	"Takane no Ringo" (Apel Yang Ada Di Puncak)		Tim J
4.	"Escape"		Tim KIII
5.	"Kinou Yori Motto Suki" (Dibanding Kemarin Semakin Suka)		Tim T
6.	"Pareo is Your Emerald" (English Version)		Senbatsu
7.	"Pareo wa Emerald" (off vocal / Instrumental (Khusus Edisi terbatas)

DVD
No.	Title	Length
1.	"Pareo wa Emerald (Pareoa adalah Emerald) Music Video"
2.	"Pareo wa Emerald (Pareoa adalah Emerald) Video Behind the Scenes"

=== Personnel ===
Melody Laksani is the center performer for the title track. The performers are listed as follows:

Team J: Beby Chaesara Anadila, Devi Kinal Putri, Haruka Nakagawa, Jessica Veranda, Melody Nurramdhani Laksani, Nabilah Ratna Ayu Azalia, Rezky Whiranti Dhike, Shania Junianatha

Team KIII : Cindy Yuvia, Jennifer Hanna, Ratu Vienny Fitrilya, Rona Anggreani, Shinta Naomi, Thalia

Team T : Andela Yuwono, Michelle Christo Kusnadi
