= Aki Deguchi =

Japanese singer

Aki Deguchi 出口 陽
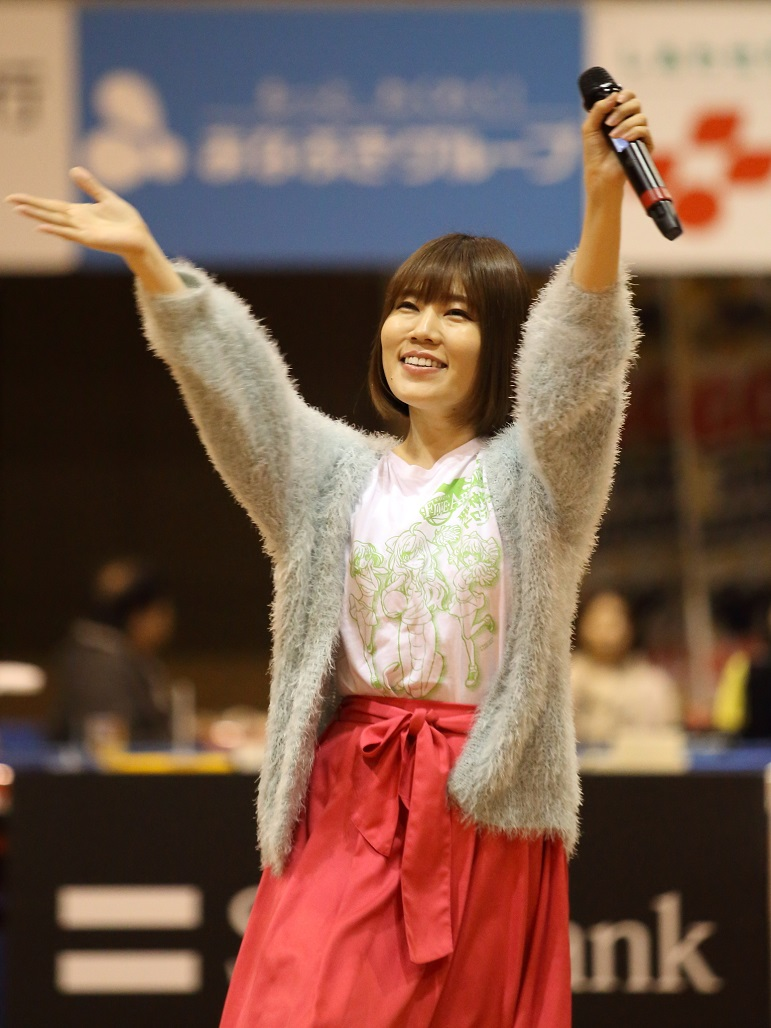
- Deguchi in 2019

Background information
- Also known as: Aki
- Born: 14 March 1988 (age 38); Matsusaka, Mie, Japan
- Genres: j-pop
- Occupation: singer
- Years active: 2007-present
- Label: Universal Music Japan

Aki Deguchi (出口 陽, Deguchi Aki; born 14 March 1988), also known as Aki, is a Japanese singer, as a solo artist and former member of the Japanese idol J-pop group SKE48.

== Career ==
Deguchi participated in AKB48's First AKK Kenky Audience (Force 4), which included 18 people who were accepted as training students on May 27, 2007. Shizuka Ōya, Amina Sato and Reina Fujie were among her contemporaries at AKB48.

At the Sunflower 1st stage theater show "Boku no Taiyou", on November 26, 2007, she announced her departure from AKB48 on the grounds of wanting to continue her studies. But she did not retire from singing. Deguchi re-auditioned, this time for SKE48. She was among the 22 people who passed the audition on July 31, 2008. Deguchi was selected as one of the 16 members of the Senbatsu for the first SKE48 theater performance of Team S 1st Stage "Party ga Hajimaru yo". She took to the stage of the SKE48 Theater for the first time on October 5, 2008. When Team S was formed in March 2009, its members came from 16 members of the theatrical performances senbatsu, including Deguchi.

The television drama series Paranoid detective! starring SKE48 members was her first acting experience. Her role as one of the detectives together with Jurina Matsui, Rikako Hirata, and Haruka Ono. The television drama aired January 12, 2011 to March 30, 2011 on Tokai Television Broadcasting.

She was no longer elected as a senbatsu member since the inaugural single Tsuyoki Mono yo involving all members of SKE48.

In 2014, she left SKE48.

In 2015, she released her first solo single, "FLASHBACK."

== Discography ==
#	Release date	Title	Format	Catalog number	Notes
1	02.25.2015	FLASHBACK	CD	MIUZ-12; MIUZ-13	Type-A; Type B
2	11.16.2016	Zettaiteki Seiten Aozora 絶対的晴天青空	CD	POCS -1509; POCS-1510; POCS-1511	aki Edition; Crane Game Edition; Dark Cherry Edition
3	08.23.2017	Kurione no Akari/Starting Days!! クリオネの灯り/Starting Days!!	CD	POCS-1615; POCS-1616; POCS-1617	aki Edition; Clione's Light Edition; Neptunia Edition
4	05.02.2018	Sakurairo no Cliché 桜色クリシェ	CD	POCS-1687; POCS-1688	aki Edition; Rokuhōdō Yotsuiro Biyori Edition
5	11.20.2019	Biroudo no Kioku ビロードの記憶	CD	XNCD-10001	
6	01.03.2021	Heart	Digital Download		
