= JKT48 discography and filmography =

JKT48 discography
- Studio albums: 4
- Extended plays: 21
- Singles: 27
- Music videos: 31
- Greatest hits albums: 1
- TikTok singles: 1

JKT48 has released a total of 27 singles, four studio albums, seven stage albums, one live album, one mini album, three collaboration songs, and performed a number of unreleased songs.

== Studio albums ==
Title	Album information	Notes	Refs
Heavy Rotation	Released: 16 February 2013; Label: HITS Records; Format: CD, DVD	Type-A (CD+DVD); Type-B (CD only)	
Mahagita -Kamikyokutachi-	Released: 23 March 2016; Label: HITS Records; Format: CD, digital download	Regular version (CD only); Music card (download)	
B•E•L•I•E•V•E	Released: 13 September 2017; Label: HITS Records; Format: CD, digital download	Regular version (CD only); Music card (download)	
Joy Kick! Tears	Released: 9 October 2019; Label: HITS Records; Format: CD, digital download	Regular version (CD only); Music Card (download)	
Mahagita Vol. 2 -Kamikyokutachi Vol. 2-	Released: 27 October 2023; Format: Digital streaming	Streaming service	

== Greatest hits albums ==
Title	Album information	Notes
JKT48 Festival	Released: 9 February 2017; Label: HITS Records; Format: CD; Only sold on KFC Indonesia outlets	Regular version (CD only)

== Mini albums ==
Title	Album information	Notes
This is JKT48 New Era	Released: 14 March 2023; Format: streaming	streaming

== Live albums ==
Title	Album information	Notes
Saishuu Bell Ga Naru - Bel Terakhir Berbunyi (Live)	Released: 1 January 2020; Label: HITS Records; Format: streaming; Audio are taken from the previously released DVD of the stage	streaming

== Stage albums ==
Title	Album information	Notes
Pajama Drive	Released: 13 December 2012; Label: HITS Records; Format: CD, DVD, streaming	streaming
Aturan Anti Cinta	Released: TBA; Label: HITS Records; Format: CD, DVD, streaming	
Demi Seseorang	Released: TBA; Label: HITS Records; Format: CD, DVD, streaming	
Matahari Milikku	Released: TBA; Label: HITS Records; Format: CD, DVD, streaming	
Sambil Menggandeng Erat Tanganku	Released: TBA; Label: HITS Records; Format: CD, DVD, streaming	
Dewi Teater	Released: TBA; Label: HITS Records; Format: CD, DVD, streaming	
Sekarang Sedang Jatuh Cinta	Released: TBA; Label: HITS Records; Format: CD, DVD, digital download, streaming	

== Singles ==
#	Title	Album information	Notes
1	"RIVER"	Released: 11 May 2013; Label: HITS Records; Format: CD, DVD, streaming	Regular version (CD+DVD); Theater version (CD only)
2	"Yuuhi wo Miteiruka?" -Apakah Kau Melihat Mentari Senja?-	Released: 3 July 2013; Label: HITS Records; Format: CD, DVD, streaming; First JKT48 single of to have less than 16 members (10)	Regular version (CD+DVD); Theater version (CD only)
3	"Fortune Cookie yang Mencinta" -Fortune Cookie in Love-	Released: 21 August 2013; Label: HITS Records; Format: CD, DVD, streaming	Regular version (CD+DVD); Theater version (CD only)
4	"Manatsu no Sounds Good!" -Musim Panas Sounds Good!-	Released: 26 November 2013; Label: HITS Records; Format: CD, DVD, streaming	Regular version (CD+DVD); Theater version (CD only)
5	"Flying Get"	Released: 5 March 2014; Label: HITS Records; Format: CD, streaming	Alfa Group version (CD only); Theater version (CD only)
6	"Gingham Check"	Released: 11 June 2014; Label: HITS Records; Format: CD, DVD, streaming	Regular version (CD+DVD); Theater version (CD only)
7	"Papan Penanda Isi Hati" -Message on a Placard-	Release date: 27 August 2014; Label: HITS Records; Format: CD, DVD, streaming	Regular version (CD+DVD); Theater version (CD only)
8	"Angin Sedang Berhembus" -The Wind is Blowing/Kaze wa Fuiteiru-	Release date: 24 December 2014; Label: HITS Records; Format: CD, DVD, streaming	Regular version (CD+DVD); Theater version (CD only)
9	"Pareo adalah Emerald" -Pareo wa Emerald-	Released: 27 March 2015; Label: HITS Records; Format: CD, DVD, streaming	Regular version (CD+DVD); Theater version (CD only)
10	"Refrain Penuh Harapan" -Kibouteki Refrain-	Released: 27 May 2015; Label: HITS Records; Format: CD, DVD, digital download, streaming	Regular version (CD+DVD); Music card (download)
11	"Halloween Night"	Released: 26 August 2015; Label: HITS Records; Format: CD, DVD, digital download, streaming	Regular version (CD+DVD); Music card (download)
12	"Beginner"	Released: 1 January 2016; Label: HITS Records; Format: CD, DVD, digital download, streaming	Regular version (CD+DVD); Music card (download)
13	"Hanya Lihat ke Depan" -Mae Shika Mukanee-	Released: 1 June 2016; Label: HITS Records; Format: CD, DVD, digital download, streaming	Regular version (CD+DVD); Music card (download)
14	"Love Trip"	Released: 21 September 2016; Label: HITS Records; Format: CD, DVD, digital download, streaming	Regular version (CD+DVD); Music card (download)
15	"Luar Biasa" -Saikou Kayo-	Released: 21 December 2016; Label: HITS Records; Format: CD, DVD, digital download, streaming	Regular version (CD+DVD); Music card (download)
16	"So Long!"	Released: 8 March 2017; Label: HITS Records; Format: CD, DVD, digital download, streaming	Regular version (CD+DVD); Music card (download)
17	"Indahnya Senyum Manismu dst." -Kimi no Hohoemi wo Yume ni Miru-	Released: 7 June 2017; Label: HITS Records; Format: CD, DVD, digital download, streaming	Regular version (CD+DVD); Music card (download)
18	"Dirimu Melody" -Kimi wa Melody-	Released: 16 December 2017; Label: HITS Records; Format: CD, DVD, digital download, streaming; First single to contain less than 4 songs, thus did not considered as an EP.	Regular version (CD+DVD); Music card (download)
19	"Everyday, Kachuusha" / "UZA" -Everyday, Katyusha- / UZA	Released: 7 July 2018; Label: HITS Records; Format: CD, DVD, digital download, streaming; First double single of JKT48	Regular version (CD+DVD); Music card (download)
20	"High Tension"	Released: 11 January 2019 (music card), 25 January 2019 (Joox, Spotify), 30 March 2019 (CD+DVD); Label: HITS Records; Format: CD, DVD, digital download, streaming	Regular version (CD+DVD); Music card (download)
21	"Rapsodi"	Released: 22 January 2020; Label: HITS Records; Format: CD, DVD, digital download, streaming; First original single of JKT48	Regular version (CD+DVD); Music card (download)
22	"Cara Ceroboh untuk Mencinta" -Darashinai Aishikata-	Released: 16 March 2021; Format: Digital streaming, CD (limited), audio cassette (limited), USB flash disk (limited)	Streaming service; Deluxe edition (CD, audio cassette and USB flash disk)
23	"Flying High"	Released: 17 June 2022; Format: Digital streaming, CD (limited), USB flash disk (limited); Second original single of JKT48	Streaming service; Deluxe edition (CD and USB flash disk)
24	"Sayonara Crawl"	Released: 11 October 2023; Format: Digital streaming, CD (limited)	Streaming service; Special set (CD)
25	"Magic Hour"	Released: 8 May 2024 (short movies), 9 May 2024 (music video), 10 May 2024 (digital music platforms); Format: Digital streaming; Third original single of JKT48	Streaming service
26	"#KuSangatSuka" -#Sukinanda-	Released: 2 February 2025 (music video), 3 February 2025 (digital music platforms); Format: Digital streaming	Streaming service
27	"Andai 'Ku Bukan Idola" -Idol Nanka Janakattara-	Released: 4 February 2026 (music video, digital music platforms); Format: Digital streaming	Streaming service

=== Senbatsu history ===
Key
(c)	Indicates the single's center(s)

Member's name	Single																											
Member's name	#1	#2	#3	#4	#5	#6	#7	#8	#9	#10	#11	#12	#13	#14	#15	#16	#17	#18	#19		#20	#21	#22	#23	#24	#25	#26	#27
Member's name	#1	#2	#3	#4	#5	#6	#7	#8	#9	#10	#11	#12	#13	#14	#15	#16	#17	#18	EK	U	#20	#21	#22	#23	#24	#25	#26	#27
Adhisty Zara	Not in the group																		c			Not in the group						
Adriani Elisabeth	Not in the group																						Not in the group					
Adzana Shaliha	Not in the group																									Not in the group		
Aki Takajo						Not in the group																						
Alicia Chanzia																						Not in the group						
Amirah Fatin	Not in the group																							Not in the group				
Andela Yuwono	Not in the group											Not in the group																
Angelina Christy	Not in the group																											
Aninditha Rahma C.	Not in the group																							Not in the group				
Ariella C. Ichwan	Not in the group																							Not in the group				
Aurellia	Not in the group																											
Ayana Shahab																				c		Not in the group						
Ayu Safira Oktaviani	Not in the group																					Not in the group						
Azizi Asadel	Not in the group																							c		c	Not in the group	
Beby Chaesara A.																				c			Not in the group					
Cindy Hapsari M. P. P.	Not in the group																								Not in the group			
Cindy Yuvia																					c	Not in the group						
Cornelia Vanisa	Not in the group																											
Delima Rizky													Not in the group															
Della Delila																						Not in the group						
Dena Siti Rohyati																			Not in the group									
Devi Kinal Putri	c																		Not in the group									
Dhea Angelia	Not in the group																								Not in the group			
Diani Amalia R.	Not in the group																						Not in the group					
Dwi Putri Bonita																					Not in the group							
Elaine Hartanto	Not in the group												Not in the group															
Eve A. Ichwan	Not in the group																							Not in the group				
Febriola Sinambela	Not in the group																											
Feni Fitriyanti	Not in the group																										c	
Fiony Alveria Tantri	Not in the group																											c
Flora Shafiq	Not in the group																											Not in the group
Fransisca S. P. D.	Not in the group																								Not in the group			
Freya Jayawardana	Not in the group																											
Frieska A. Laksani																							Not in the group					
Gabriela M. Warouw																									Not in the group			
Gabryela Marcelina	Not in the group																						Not in the group					
Ghaida Farisya															Not in the group													
Gita Sekar Andarini	Not in the group																											
Grace Octaviani	Not in the group																											
Greesella Adhalia	Not in the group																											
Haruka Nakagawa			c													Not in the group												
Helisma Putri	Not in the group																											
Indah Cahya	Not in the group																											
Jennifer Hanna															Not in the group													
Jennifer Rachel N.																						Not in the group						
Jessica Chandra	Not in the group																											
Jessica Vania																	Not in the group											
Jessica Veranda		c						c		c	c		c			c	Not in the group											
Jesslyn Callista	Not in the group																								Not in the group			
Jinan Safa Safira	Not in the group																								Not in the group			
Kathrina Irene	Not in the group																											
Lidya M. Djuhandar																					Not in the group							
Lulu Salsabila	Not in the group																											
Made Devi R. Ningtara	Not in the group																				Not in the group							
Marsha Lenathea	Not in the group																									c		
Melati Putri R. S.	Not in the group																						Not in the group					
Melody N. Laksani	c	c		c	c	c		c	c			c						c	Not in the group									
Michelle Alexandra	Not in the group																											
Michelle C. Kusnadi	Not in the group																					Not in the group						
Mutiara Azzahra	Not in the group																											
Nabilah R. Ayu Azalia															c			Not in the group										
Nadhifa Salsabila	Not in the group															Not in the group												
Nadila Cindi W.																							Not in the group					
Natalia																						Not in the group						
Ni Made A. V. Aurellia	Not in the group																						Not in the group					
Noella Sisterina									Not in the group																			
Nurhayati	Not in the group																						Not in the group					
Priscillia Sari Dewi																					Not in the group							
Puti Nadhira Azalia	Not in the group																						Not in the group					
Ratu Vienny Fitrilya																						Not in the group						
Rena Nozawa						Not in the group																						
Reva Fidela	Not in the group																										Not in the group	
Rezky W. Dhike															Not in the group													
Rica Leyona								Not in the group																				
Rina Chikano	Not in the group																		Not in the group									
Riska Amelia Putri	Not in the group																						Not in the group					
Riskha Fairunissa																					Not in the group							
Rona Anggreani																							Not in the group					
Saktia Oktapyani																					Not in the group							
Sendy Ariani															Not in the group													
Shani Indira Natio	Not in the group																c					c	c		c		Not in the group	
Shania Gracia	Not in the group																											Not in the group
Shania Junianatha							c															Not in the group						
Shinta Naomi																					Not in the group							
Sinka Juliani														c								Not in the group						
Sonia Natalia																						Not in the group						
Stella Cornelia					Not in the group																							
Stephanie P. Indarto P.	Not in the group																					Not in the group						
Tan Zhi Hui Celine	Not in the group																								Not in the group			
Thalia											Not in the group																	
Thalia Ivanka E.																						Not in the group						
Viona Fadrin	Not in the group																						Not in the group					
Viviyona Apriani																						Not in the group						
Yansen Indiani	Not in the group															Not in the group												
Yessica Tamara	Not in the group																									Not in the group		
Zahra Nur	Not in the group																							Not in the group				

== Promotional singles ==
Prior to debut, JKT48 released the following sample CD's under Hits Records on 23 December 2012. Those are covers of AKB48 songs.

- Heavy Rotation: Sample CD Type 01 of 04
- Karena Kusuka Dirimu: Sample CD Type 02 of 04
- Baby! Baby! Baby!: Sample CD Type 03 of 04
- Ponytail dan Shu-shu: Sample CD Type 04 of 04

== Stage performances ==
=== Pajama Drive ===
Pajama Drive is a theater stage that was initially performed by the first generation on 17–20 May 2012 in the Nyi Ageng Serang Building in Kuningan, Jakarta. They followed with performances at Studio 7 Pasaraya Grande Blok M in Jakarta on 14–17 June and on 13–15 July. After their theater's development at fX Sudirman finished, they performed Pajama Drive there from 8 September–13 December 2012. The second generation trainees later performed Pajama Drive from 11 January to 12 May 2013. The third generation trainees performed Pajama Drive at the theater from 24 May 2014 to 17 January 2015, and followed by the members promoted to the newly formed Team T as a waiting stage from 28 January to 6 March 2015. The stage was later performed by Team KIII as a waiting stage, alternately with the revived "Matahari Milikku" between 31 March and 28 July 2015. A combined team of fourth and fifth generation trainees performed the set list between 7 August and 19 November 2016. The stage would later be used for the newly introduced JKT48 academy with members ranging from the fifth and ninth generation. It is currently performed by the tenth generation.

The stage contains sixteen performed songs, preceded by an overture recorded specifically for the group, following its sister groups. A CD and DVD of the stage was released on 13 December 2012.

==== Set list ====
Overture

1. Hari Pertama (Shonichi)
2. Jurus Rahasia Teleport (Hissatsu Teleport)
3. Putri Duyung yang Sedang Sedih (Gokigen Naname na Mermaid)
4. Bersepeda Berdua (Futari Nori no Jitensha)
5. Ekor Malaikat (Tenshi no Shippo)
6. Pajama Drive
7. Prinsip Kesucian Hati (Junjou Shugi)
8. Air Mata Perasaan yang Tak Tersampaikan (Temodemo no Namida)
9. Joan of Arc di Dalam Cermin (Kagami no Naka no Jeanne D'Arc)
10. Two Years Later
11. Cara Menggunakan Hidup (Inochi no Tsukaimichi)
12. Rugi Sudah Dicium (Kiss Shite Son Shichatta)
13. Bunga Sakuraku (Boku no Sakura)

Encore

1. Wasshoi J!
2. Pelaut yang Melihat Mimpi di Tengah Badai (Suifu wa Arashi ni Yume wo Miru)
3. Baju Putih (Shiroi Shirts)

=== Aturan Anti Cinta ===
Aturan Anti Cinta, also known as Renai Kinshi Jourei and literally translated as "Love Ban Rule", is a theater stage first performed by Team J on 26 December 2012 and ended on 28 December 2013. Team T later performed the stage between 7 December 2016 and 22 May 2017. The stage is currently performed by the new formation of JKT48 since March 2021.

The set list contains sixteen performed songs, preceded by an overture recorded specifically for the group, following its sister groups.

==== Set list ====
Overture

1. Cahaya Panjang (Nagai Hikari)
2. Di Tengah Hujan Badai Tiba-Tiba (Squall no Aida Ni)
3. Gadis SMA Putri Tidur (JK Nemurihime)
4. Jatuh Cinta Setiap Bertemu Denganmu (Kimi ni Au Tabi Koi wo Suru)
5. Malaikat Hitam (Kuroi Tenshi)
6. Virus Tipe Hati (Heart Gata Virus)
7. Aturan Anti Cinta (Renai Kinshi Jourei)
8. Tsundere!
9. Mawar Natal Musim Panas (Manatsu no Christmas Rose)
10. Switch
11. 109 (Marukyuu)
12. Jejak Awan Pesawat (Hikoukigumo)
13. Sneakers Waktu Itu (Ano Koro no Sneakers)

Encore

1. JKT Datang! (JKT Sanjou!)
2. Nafas Dalam Air Mata (Namida no Shinkokyuu)
3. Teriakan Berlian (Oogoe Diamond)

=== Matahari Milikku ===
Matahari Milikku, also known as Boku no Taiyou and literally translated as "My Sun", is a theater stage performed by the second generation trainees on 17 May to 25 June 2013 and by those trainees who subsequently promoted to Team KIII from 28 June 2013 to 24 February 2014. The stage was then performed by Team J as a surprise stage between 13 February and 13 March 2015. Team KIII performed the stage again as a waiting stage, alternately with the revived "Pajama Drive" from 6 May to 29 July 2015. Team T later performed the stage from 8 July to 9 December 2017.

The set list contains sixteen performed songs, preceded by an overture recorded specifically for the group, following its sister groups.

==== Set list ====
Overture

1. Dreamin' Girls
2. Run Run Run
3. Buah Masa Depan (Mirai no Kajitsu)
4. Viva! Hurricane
5. Jangan Panggil Aku Idol (Idol Nante Yobanaide)
6. Aku, Juliet dan Jet Coaster (Boku to Juliet to Jet Coaster)
7. Higurashi no Koi
8. Pertahanan dari Cinta (Itoshisa no Defense)
9. Bunga Matahari (Himawari)
10. Kakak Kelasku (Takeuchi Senpai)
11. Dengan Berbagai Alasan (Sonna Konna Wake De)
12. Déja vu
13. Apakah Kau Melihat Mentari Senja? (Yuuhi wo Miteiru ka?)

Encore

1. Lay Down
2. Bingo!
3. Matahari Milikku (Boku no Taiyou)

=== Demi Seseorang ===
Demi Seseorang, also known as Dareka no Tame ni and literally translated as "For Someone", is a theater stage performed by Team J from 18 January 2014 to 26 April 2015. Team T later performed the stage between 10 December 2017 and 18 April 2018.

The set list contains fourteen performed songs, preceded by an overture recorded specifically for the group, following its sister groups.

==== Set list ====
Overture

1. Evening Primrose (Tsukimisou)
2. Warning
3. Malam Ulang Tahun (Tanjoubi no Yoru)
4. Bird
5. Jatuhkan dengan Kiss Bye! (Nage Kiss de Uchi Otose!)
6. Khayalan (Shinkirou)
7. Rider
8. Seragam ini Sangat Mengganggu (Seifuku ga Jama wo Suru)
9. Summer Has Gone (Natsu ga Icchatta)
10. Adyth (Koike)
11. Bentuk Sang Rembulan (Tsuki no Katachi)
12. Demi Seseorang (Dareka no Tame ni ~What can I do for someone?~)

Encore

1. "Medley"
2. Gadis Penjual Air Mata (Namida Uri no Shoujo)

=== Gadis-Gadis Remaja ===
Gadis-Gadis Remaja, also known as Seishun Girls and literally translated as "Youth Girls", is a theater stage performed by Team KIII from 8 March 2014 to 14 Maret 2015. Team T later performed the stage between 20 April and 25 August 2018.

The set list contains fourteen performed songs, preceded by an overture recorded specifically for the group, following its sister groups.

==== Set list ====
Overture

1. Gadis-Gadis Remaja (Seishun Girls)
2. Beach Sandal
3. Sampai Dirimu Menjadi Bintang (Kimi ga Hoshi ni Naru Made)
4. Blue Rose
5. Dua Orang yang Terlarang (Kinjirareta Futari)
6. Kebun Binatang di Saat Hujan (Ame no Doubutsuen)
7. Musim Panas yang Kacau (Fushidara na Natsu)
8. Don't Disturb!
9. Virgin Love
10. Garis Pergantian Hari Cinta (Hizuke Henkousen)
11. Kembang Api Milikku (Boku no Uchiage Hanabi)

Encore

1. Janji ya (Yakusoku yo)
2. Jadilah Batu yang Berputar (Korogaru Ishi ni Nare)
3. Cinderella Tak Akan Tertipu (Cinderella wa Damasarenai)

=== Sambil Menggandeng Erat Tanganku ===
Sambil Menggandeng Erat Tanganku, also known as Te wo Tsunaginagara and literally translated as "While Holding My Hands", is a theater stage performed by Team T from 15 March 2015 to 26 November 2016.

The set list contains sixteen performed songs, preceded by an overture recorded specifically for the group, following its sister groups.

==== Set list ====
Overture

1. Angin Kita (Bokura no Kaze)
2. Mango No.2
3. Sambil Menggandeng Erat Tanganku (Te wo Tsunaginagara)
4. Bel Sekolah adalah Love Song (Chime wa Love Song)
5. Glory Days
6. Barcode Hati Ini (Kono Mune no Barcode)
7. Ajak Aku Pergi Menuju ke Wimbledon (Wimbledon e Tsuretette)
8. Sang Pianis Hujan (Ame no Pianist)
9. Keberadaan Cokelat Itu (Choco no Yukue)
10. Innocence
11. Romance Rocket
12. Arah Sang Cinta dan Balasannya (Koi no Keikou to Taisaku)
13. Aku Sangat Suka (Daisuki)

Encore

1. Tali Persahabatan (Rope no Yuujou)
2. Malam Hari Selasa, Pagi Hari Rabu (Kayoubi no Yoru Suiyobi no Asa)
3. Di Tempat yang Jauh pun (Tooku ni Ite mo)

=== Dewi Theater ===
Dewi Theater, also known as Theater no Megami and literally translated as "Theater Goddesses", is a theater stageperformed by Team J from 17 May 2015 to 27 November 2016.

The set list contains sixteen performed songs, preceded by an overture recorded specifically for the group, following its sister groups. The stage is opened by a "Zenza Girl" (opener girl) singing "Petak Umpet Romansa" before overture. Zenza Girl differs each shows and is performed by trainees.

==== Set list ====
Overture

1. Palu Keberanian (Yuuki No Hammer)
2. Persentase Meteor (Inseki Kakuritsu)
3. Stripper Cinta (Ai no Stripper)
4. Dewi Theater (Theater no Megami)
5. Cinta Pertamaku, Selamat Siang (Hatsukoi yo, Konnichiwa)
6. Pada Malam yang Berbadai (Arashi no Yoru ni wa)
7. Candy
8. Locker Room Boy
9. Perbuatan Angin Malam (Yokaze no Shiwaza)
10. 100 Meter ke Minimarket (100 Meter Conbini)
11. Suka, Suka, Suka (Suki, Suki, Suki)
12. Membeku Karena Selamat Tinggal (Sayonara no Kanashibari)
13. Surat Undangan Sang Angin Laut (Shiokaze no Shoutaijou)

Encore

1. Honest Man
2. Team J Oshi
3. Pesawat Terbang Kertas Milik Kita (Bokutachi no Kamihikouki)

=== Bel Terakhir Berbunyi ===
Bel Terakhir Berbunyi, also known as Saishuu Bell ga Naru and literally translated as "The Final Bell Rings", is a theater stage performed by Team KIII from 1 August 2015 to 27 November 2016.

The set list contains sixteen performed songs, preceded by an overture recorded specifically for the group, following its sister groups.

==== Set list ====
Overture

1. Mammoth
2. Bel Terakhir Berbunyi (Saishuu Bell ga Naru)
3. Cara Mendapatkan Pacar (Boyfriend no Tsukurikata)
4. Tak Ingin Jadi Orang Hebat (Erai Hito ni Naritakunai)
5. Return Match
6. Pencuri Cinta Pertama (Hatsukoi Dorobou)
7. Maafkan, Permataku (Gomen Ne Jewel)
8. Benang Sari, Putik, dan Kupu-Kupu Malam (Oshibe to Meshibe to Yoru no Chouchou)
9. Lagu 18 Bersaudari (18nin Shimai no Uta)
10. Stand Up!
11. Cool Girl
12. Kapasitas Ikan Migrasi (Kaiyuugyou no Capacity)
13. Pergi untuk Bertemu (Ai ni Ikou)

Encore

1. Kucing Siam (Shamu Neko)
2. Jalan Melos (Melos no Michi)
3. Dukungan (Sasae)

=== Team KIII B•E•L•I•E•V•E Show ===
Team KIII B•E•L•I•E•V•E Show was a special theater stage, performed by Team KIII to celebrate the group's 5th anniversary, from 8 December 2016 to 27 February 2018. The stage consists of previously released and unreleased performed songs.

Initially, the stage consisted of 15 songs. The later shows featured an amended set list in which the "unit songs" – the 4th until 7th song – was extended to the eight songs. The "/" below are sorted based on which song was sung first on that order. The songs in each theater show were different and thus had no songs repeated during that particular show.

==== Set list ====
Overture

1. 1! 2! 3! 4! Yoroshiku!
2. Musim Panas Sounds Good! (Manatsu no Sounds Good!)
3. Ponytail dan Shu-shu (Ponytail to Shushu)
4. Blue Rose or Bird or Return Match or Candy or Glory Days
5. Cinta Pertama di Jam 7 Lewat 12 / Joan of Arc di Dalam Cermin / Benang Sari, Putik, dan Kupu-Kupu Malam / Cinta Pertamaku, Selamat Siang / Barcode Hati Ini / Jatuhkan dengan Kiss Bye!
6. Sang Pianis Hujan / Ajak Aku Pergi Menuju ke Wimbledon / Pin Heel Merah dan Profesor / Prinsip Kesucian Hati / Candy
7. Bunga Matahari / Pada Malam yang Berbadai / Pelaut yang Melihat Mimpi di Tengah Badai / Rok Bergoyang / Locker Room Boy / Return Match / Dua Orang yang Terlarang
8. Malaikat Hitam / Pin Heel Merah dan Profesor / Ajak Aku Pergi Menuju ke Wimbledon / Ayo Penuh Skandal
9. Langit Biru Cinta Searah / Kali Ini Ecstasy
10. Kilat yang Indah (Utsukushii Inazuma)
11. Medley (River, Beginner, Escape; later Beloklah Ke Kanan!, How Come?, Don't Look Back!)
12. Kembang Api Milikku (Boku no Uchiage Hanabi)

Encore

1. Scrap & Build / Kamonegix
2. Selamanya Pressure (Eien Pressure)
3. Team KIII Oshi
4. Apakah Kau Melihat Mentari Senja? (Yuuhi wo Miteiru ka?) / Di Tempat yang Jauh pun (Tooku ni Ite mo)

=== Team J B•E•L•I•E•V•E Show ===
Team J B•E•L•I•E•V•E Show was a special theater stage, performed by Team J to celebrate the group's 5th anniversary, from 9 December 2016 to 14 May 2017. The stage consists of previously released and unreleased performed songs.

==== Set list ====
Overture

1. Flying Get
2. Simpati Gravitasi (Juuryoku Sympathy)
3. Cinta Tak Berbalas Finally (Kataomoi Finally)
4. Maafkan Summer (Gomen ne, Summer)
5. Bird
6. Kaca Berbentuk I LOVE YOU (Glass no I LOVE YOU)
7. Classmate
8. Hubungan Antara Kau dan Aku (Kimi to Boku no Kankei)
9. Lagu 22 Bersaudari (22nin Shimai no Uta)
10. Nagiichi
11. Ciuman Juga Kidal (Kiss Datte Hidarikiki)
12. Laptime Gadis Remaja (Seishun no Laptime)
13. Demi Seseorang (Dareka no Tame ni ~What can I do for someone?~)

Encore

1. HA!
2. Pareo adalah Emerald (Pareo wa Emerald)
3. Only Today
4. Pioneer

=== Sekarang Sedang Jatuh Cinta ===
Sekarang Sedang Jatuh Cinta, also known as Tadaima Renaichuu, is a program performed by Team J from 19 May 2017 to 1 March 2019.

Overture

1. Tadaima Renaichuu (Sekarang Sedang Jatuh Cinta)
2. Kuma no Nuigurumi (Boneka Teddy Bear)
3. Only Today
4. 7ji 12fun no Hatsukoi (Cinta Pertama di Jam 7 Lewat 12)
5. Haru ga Kuru Made (Sampai Musim Semi Tiba)
6. Junai no Crescendo (Cinta yang Tulus, Crescendo)
7. Faint
8. Kikyou (Pulang Kampung)
9. Darui Kanji (Rasanya Malas)
10. Mr. Kissman
11. Kimi ga Oshiete Kureta (Kamulah yang Memberitahu Aku)
12. BINGO!
13. Keibetsu Shiteita Aijou (Rasa Sayang yang Dulu Aku Remehkan)

Encore

1. LOVE CHASE
2. Seifuku ga Jama wo Suru (Seragam Ini Sangat Mengganggu)
3. Nante Suteki na Sekai ni Umareta no Darou (Betapa Indahnya Dunia Tempat Kita Lahir)

=== Back Hip Circle ===
Back Hip Circle, also known as Saka Agari, is a theater stage performed by Team KIII from 4 March 2018.

Overture

1. Tenohira (Telapak Tangan)
2. Saka Agari (Back Hip Circle)
3. Hitei no Requiem (Penyangkalan Diri Requiem)
4. Sono Ase wa Uso wo Tsukanai (Keringat itu Tidak Berbohong)
5. End Roll
6. Wagamama na Nagareboshi (Si Bintang Jatuh yang Egois)
7. Ai no Iro (Warna Cinta)
8. Dakishimeraretara (Jika Aku Dipelukmu)
9. Mushi no Ballad (Balada Serangga)
10. Furishite Maneshite (Pura-pura dan Kepalsuan)
11. Umi wo Watare! (Seberangi Lautan)
12. Machikado no Party (Party di Sudut Jalan)
13. Fan Letter

Encore

1. Fugiri (Terhina)
2. Hanpa na Ikemen (Ganteng tapi Nanggung)
3. To Be Continued

=== Fajar Sang Idola ===
Fajar Sang Idola, also known as Idol no Yoake, is a program performed by Team J from 3 March 2019.

Overture

1. Idol no Yoake (Fajar Sang Idola)
2. Minnasan mo go Issho ni (Bersama-sama Semuanya)
3. Haru Ichiban ga Fuku Koro (Angin Musim Semi Pertama)
4. Kobushi no Seigi (Kebenaran Tinju Ini)
5. Zannen Shoujo (Gadis yang Celaka)
6. Kuchi Utsushi no Chocolate (Berikan Coklat dengan Bibir)
7. Kataomoi no Taikakusen (Garis Diagonal Cinta Searah)
8. Tengoku Yarou (Berandalan di Surga)
9. Itoshiki Natasha (Natasha yang 'Ku Cinta)
10. Joshikousei wa Yamerarenai (Tak Bisa Berhenti Jadi Gadis SMA)
11. Suki to Ieba Yokatta (Andai 'Ku Dapat Ungkapkan Cinta)
12. Sobakasu no Kiss (Freckles' Kiss)
13. Tanpopo no Kesshin (Keteguhan Hati Dandelion)

Encore

1. J Stars
2. Yokosuka Curve (Jalan Berkelok Yokosuka)
3. Arigatou (Terima Kasih)

== Unreleased songs ==
JKT48 has performed numerous songs that are yet to be released

- Kitagawa Kenji (2012)
- Tenohira ga Kataru Koto (2013)
- Party ga Hajimaru yo (2014)
- Classmate (2014)
- Nakinagara Hohoende (2014)
- Oteage Lullaby (2014)
- Kini Dake ni Chu! Chu! Chu! (2014)
- Jibun Rashisa (2014)
- Tobenai Agehachou (2015)
- Ue Kara Melody (2015)
- Aisatsu Kara Hajimeyou (2015)
- Scandalous ni Ikou (2015)
- Futari wa Dekiteru (2015)
- Plastic no Kuchibiru (2015)
- Ougon Center (2015)
- Anata to Christmas Eve (2015)
- Band wo Yarou yo (2016)
- Hatsukoi Dash (2016)
- Valentine Day Kiss (2017)
- Ai no Sonzai (2018)
- Tsuyosa to Yowasa no Aida de (2019)
- Seifuku no Me stage songs, except Seifuku no Me (2019)
- Aitakatta stage songs, except Aitakatta and Mirai no Tobira (2023)
- Cosmos no Kioku (2023)
- Sugar Rush (2024)
- Dear J (2025)
- Zankoku na Ame (2025)
- Romantic Snow (2025)
- Jika Aku Harus Merangkumnya (2026)

== Filmography ==
=== Films ===
Year	Title	Group/Individual	Notes
2014	Viva JKT48	Group	8 members as leading casts, 8 members as supporting casts, the rest of Team J and KIII members as bit casts.
2015	Wewe	Individual	Nabilah Ratna Ayu Azalia as supporting actress
2015	JKT48 Journal: Members Life Stories About	Group	Documentary film, direct-to-DVD.
2015	Sunshine Becomes You	Individual	Nabilah Ratna Ayu Azalia as leading actress
2018	Dilan 1990	Individual	Adhisty Zara as bit actress
2018	Partikelir	Individual	Shinta Naomi makes cameo appearance
2018	Dirimu Melody: The Story	Group	Documentary film, direct-to-DVD.
2018	Keluarga Cemara	Individual	Adhisty Zara as leading actress 3 members (Eve Antoinette Ichwan, Melati Putri Rahel Sesilia, Thalia Ivanka Elizabeth) as bit actresses 1 member (Citra Ayu Pranajaya Wibrado) as bit actress leaves the group before the film's release
2019	Dilan 1991	Individual	Adhisty Zara as supporting actress Shania Gracia makes uncredited cameo appearance
2019	Dua Garis Biru	Individual	Adhisty Zara as leading actress 2 members (Ariella Calista Ichwan, Cindy Hapsari M. P. P.) as bit actresses
2019	Ratu Ilmu Hitam	Individual	Adhisty Zara as main actress
2019	Koboy Kampus	Individual	Ratu Vienny Fitrilya as supporting actress
2019	Senior	Individual	Ariella Calista Ichwan as supporting actress
2021	The Heartbreak Club	Individual	Fransisca Saraswati Puspa Dewi as supporting actress
2022	Tainted Soul	Individual	Azizi Asadel as leading actress Gabriela Margareth Warouw as supporting actress graduates from the group before the film's release
2024	Ancika: Dia yang Bersamaku 1995	Individual	Azizi Asadel as leading actress Shania Gracia as supporting actress
2024	Melodate	Individual	Greesella Adhalia as supporting actress The filming process was carried out in 2022, until the film was released 2 years later
2024	Dominion of Darkness	Individual	Freya Jayawardana as supporting actress
2024	Bolehkah Sekali Saja Kumenangis	Individual	Shania Gracia as supporting actress
2024	Aku Jati, Aku Asperger	Individual	Kathrina Irene Indarto Putri as supporting actress The filming process was carried out in 2022, until the film was released 2 years later
2024	Hidup Ini Terlalu Banyak Kamu	Individual	Shania Gracia as supporting actress
2024	A Brother and 7 Siblings	Individual	Freya Jayawardana as leading actress

=== Television shows ===
Year	Title	Channel	Notes
2012	JKT48 School	Global TV	Weekly variety show
2013	JKT48 Missions	Trans7	Weekly variety show
2013	JKT48 Story	RCTI	Weekly variety show
2014–2015	iClub48	NET	Weekly variety show
2014–2015	Yokoso JKT48	Antv (2014–2015); RTV (2015)	Weekly variety show
2015–2016	The Ichiban	RTV	Weekly variety show
