= List of JKT48 performances =

Those are the lists of performances of the Indonesian idol group, JKT48:

== Asian ==
=== Television ===
- CNA News (23 March 2013) on Channel NewsAsia
- Super Japan ''Popcorn Dreams'' with AKB48 (7 March 2014) on Discovery Channel

== Indonesian ==
=== Television show or digital ===
- JKT48 School – "Global TV" at 14:30, every Sunday, 15 April – 3 June 2012 (End)
- JKT48 Missions – "Trans 7" at 10:45, every Sunday, 23 June – 22 September 2013 (Hiatus)
- JKT48 Story – "RCTI" at 16:00, every Saturday, 31 August – 2 November 2013 (Hiatus)
- iClub48 – "NET." at 19:00 (1 November, 16:00), every Saturday – Sunday, 11 October 2014 – 14 March 2015
- Yokoso JKT48 – "ANTV" at 09:00, every Sunday, 14 December 2014 – 8 March 2015
- The Ichiban – "RTV" at 11:00, every Sunday, 13 December 2015 – 14 February 2016
- Tokyo Trip: Luxury or Ordinary – "RTV" at 14:00, every Saturday-Sunday, 17–18 September and 24-25, 2016
- Japantry ''Jepang Itu Asyik" – "JAKTV" at 19:30 – 20:30, every Sunday, 7 January – 26 February 2017
- JKT48 Ureshino Trip -Episode 1-Episode 2

=== Web shows ===
- JKT48 "Obrolan Luar Biasa" – 24 March 2017 – 21 April 2017, every Friday

=== Concerts ===
- J-Pop Culture Festival 2012, Balai Kartini, Jakarta, 25 February 2012
- Konser Cinta Jakarta, RCTI, 22 June 2012
- Konser Terbaik 15th AMI Awards 2012, RCTI, 9 July 2012
- Mega Konser JKT48, RCTI, 17 July 2012
- Mahakarya RCTI 23 Tahun, RCTI, 8 August 2012
- Konser Super Dahsyat, RCTI, 1 September 2012
- Pesta Lamp10n, Global TV, 8 October 2012
- Konser 'AMA21NG' Ulang Tahun Ke-21 MNCTV, MNCTV, 20 October 2012
- 11th Anniversary Concert Kota Wisata Batu (10 November 2012, Alun-alun Kota Batu, East Java)
- HUT Emas Seskoal 50 Anniversary (17 November 2012, Pantai Karnaval Ancol, Jakarta)

=== Television shows ===
Year	Month	Date	Name	TV channel
2011	December	03	100% Ampuh	Global TV
2011	December	17	100% Ampuh	Global TV
2012	January	26	Inbox	SCTV
2012	January	28	I-Pop	SCTV
2012	January	29	100% Ampuh	Global TV
2012	February	10	100% Ampuh	Global TV
2012	February	13	Hitzteria	Indosiar
2012	February	18	A-POP	Sindo TV
2012	February	22	100% Lampion Cinta	Global TV
2012	February	22	Fokus Selebriti	Global TV
2012	February	27	Obsesi	Global TV
2012	March	18	A-POP	Sindo TV
2012	March	10	100% Ampuh	Global TV
2012	March	11	Teenlicious	Global TV
2012	March	12	Inbox	SCTV
2012	March	14	Brownies	Trans7
2012	March	29	Bukan Empat Mata	Trans7
2012	April	01	100% Ampuh	Global TV
2012	April	08	Putih Abu Abu	SCTV
2012	April	08	100% Ampuh	Global TV
2012	April	10	Warna	Trans7
2012	April	14	100% Ampuh	Global TV
2012	April	27	Indonesia Beraksi	MNCTV
2012	May	05	Kungfu Chef	Global TV
2012	May	23	Inter Milan Summer Tour 2012	RCTI
2012	May	27	Teenlicous	Global TV
2012	June	03	Hitam Putih	Trans7
2012	June	04	Comedy Project	Trans TV
2012	July	04	15th AMI Awards 2012	RCTI
2012	July	09	Konser Terbaik 15th AMI Awards 2012	RCTI
2012	August	05	100% Ampuh	Global TV
2012	August	05	Cek & Ricek	RCTI
2012	August	06	Kabar-Kabari	RCTI
2012	August	13	Dahsyat	RCTI
2012	August	15	Cek & Ricek	RCTI
2012	September	01	Konser Super Dahsyat	RCTI
2012	September	03	Kabar-Kabari	RCTI
2012	September	10	Kabar-Kabari	RCTI
2012	September	29	JKT48 2nd Generation Audition	RCTI
2012	September	25	StarTeen	Global TV
2012	October	06	JKT48 2nd Generation Final Audition	RCTI; MNCTV
2012	October	20	Konser 'AMA21NG' Ulang Tahun Ke-21 MNCTV	MNCTV
2012	October	24	Opera Van Java	Trans7
2012	October	27	JKT48 2nd Generation Road To Japan	RCTI
2012	November	17	JKT48 2nd Generation Final Audition in Japan	RCTI
2012	November	21	Sedap Malam	RCTI
2012	December	23	Dahsyat Live from Theater JKT48	RCTI
2013	January	13	Nonton Bareng MU vs Liverpool	Global TV
2013	January	19	Indonesia Mencari Bakat	Trans TV
2013	January	19	Dahsyat	RCTI
2013	January	21	Dahsyat Awards 2013	RCTI
2013	February	03	Idola Cilik	RCTI
2013	February	07	Coboy Junior Show	ANTV
2013	February	12	Insert	Trans TV
2013	February	13	Mel's Update	ANTV
2013	February	15	Insert	Trans TV
2013	February	17	Dahsyat	RCTI
2013	February	17	Ikonia	Metro TV
2013	February	23	Dahsyat	RCTI
2013	February	23	Indonesia Mencari Bakat	Trans TV
2013	March	02	On The Spot 1000 Keajaiban	Trans7
2013	March	03	J-PopZilla	O Channel
2013	March	07	Opera Van Java	Trans7
2013	March	09	Indonesia Now	Metro TV
2013	March	09	Metro Xin Wen	Metro TV
2013	March	11	Bukan Empat Mata	Trans7
2013	March	15	Penta5ketsa	Trans TV
2013	March	17	Viva La Vida	ANTV
2013	March	24	Hut Dahsyat	RCTI
2013	March	25	Spektakuler	Trans TV
2013	March	30	Kiss Pagi	Indosiar
2013	March	31	Insert	Trans TV
2013	April	07	Dahsyat	RCTI
2013	April	13	Idola Cilik	RCTI
2013	April	14	Pas Mantab	Trans7
2013	April	15	Insert	Trans TV
2013	April	15	Seleb @ Seleb	ANTV
2013	April	15	Obsesi	Global TV
2013	April	16	Konser Infiniti	RCTI
2013	April	19	Tunas	MNCTV
2013	April	20	Dahsyat	RCTI
2013	April	21	Selebrita	Trans7
2013	April	21	Konser Seru	Global TV
2013	April	17	Konser Kota Terang Hemat Energi	RCTI
2013	April	21	Selebration Selebrita in Action (Selebrita Awards 2013)	Trans7
2013	April	28	Dahsyat	RCTI
2013	April	29	Dahsyatnya RCTI OK	MNC Music
2013	May	03	Cek & Ricek	RCTI
2013	May	06	7th Anniversary MNC	RCTI
2013	May	09	Inbox	SCTV
2013	May	09	Morning C-News	MNC Lifestyle
2013	May	11	Obsesi Pagi	MNC Lifestyle
2013	May	12	Morning C-News	MNC Lifestyle
2013	May	12	Indonesia Mencari Bakat	Trans TV
2013	May	18	Konser Kota Terang Hemat Energi Palembang	RCTI
2013	May	18	Konser Mega Bintang	RCTI
2013	May	20	Dahsyat	RCTI
2013	May	21	Makan Besar	Trans7
2013	May	23	Hitam Putih	Trans7
2013	May	24	Dahsyat	RCTI
2013	May	25	Insert	Trans TV
2013	May	25	Mantap	ANTV
2013	May	26	Indonesia Mencari Bakat	Trans TV
2013	May	31	Inbox	SCTV
2013	June	02	Dahsyat	RCTI
2013	June	02	Hits Music	MNC Music
2013	June	07	Kiss Pagi	Indosiar
2013	June	15	Indonesia Kids Choice Awards 2013	Global TV
2013	June	16	Just Alvin	Metro TV
2013	June	20	Selebrita Siang	Trans7
2013	June	20	Obsesi	MNC Infotainment
2013	June	21	Extravaganza	Trans TV
2013	June	22	Dahsyat	RCTI
2013	June	22	Konser HUT DKI	SCTV
2013	June	29	HUT Gebyar BCA	Indosiar
2013	July	04	Seleb @ Seleb	ANTV
2013	July	07	Entertainment News	NET.
2013	July	07	Konser "Perkenalkan, Nama Kami JKT48"	Trans7
2013	July	14	PresCon Launching Yuuhi wo Miteiruka	Sindo TV
2013	July	14	PresCon Launching Yuuhi wo Miteiruka	MNC Music
2013	July	20	Dahsyat	RCTI
2013	July	24	Konser I Love Chelsea	MNCTV
2013	July	28	Dahsyat	RCTI
2013	July	29	Konser Menuju Miss World	RCTI
2013	July	31	Cek & Ricek	RCTI
2013	August	03	Telekuis Dapur Fiesta Ramadhan	Trans7
2013	August	11	Konser "Perkenalkan, Nama Kami JKT48" Part 2	Trans7
2013	August	17	Dahsyat	RCTI
2013	August	21	Hitam Putih	Trans7
2013	August	21	Cek & Ricek	MNC Lifestyle
2013	August	22	Entertainment News Sore	NET.
2013	August	25	Dahsyat	RCTI
2013	August	25	Selebrita Siang	Trans7
2013	August	31	Dahsyat	RCTI
2013	September	03	Konser Menuju Miss World	RCTI
2013	September	07	Yuk Keep Smile	Trans TV
2013	September	07	Entertainment News Sore	NET.
2013	September	08	Insert Pagi	Trans TV
2013	September	08	Obsesi	Global TV
2013	September	13	Dahsyat	RCTI
2013	September	14	Entertainment News Sore	NET.
2013	September	15	Yuk Keep Smile	Trans TV
2013	September	18	Grand Final Star Teen 2013	Global TV
2013	October	05	Dahsyat	RCTI
2013	October	07	Dahsyat	RCTI
2013	October	08	Konser HUT ke-11 (Kreas11ndonesia)	Global TV
2013	October	17	Selebrita Siang	Trans7
2013	October	20	Persembahan Cinta 22 (HUT ke-22)	MNCTV
2013	October	24	Celebration of a Decade (HUT ke-10) Insert	Trans TV
2013	October	26	Dahsyat	RCTI
2013	October	27	Pesta FIFA World Cup	ANTV
2013	November	09	Aku Princess	RCTI
2013	November	13	Entertainment News Sore	NET.
2013	November	16	Insert	Trans TV
2013	November	17	Yahoo OMG Awards 2013	Indosiar
2013	November	26	Dahsyat	RCTI
2013	December	02	Hitam Putih	Trans7
2013	December	11	Dahsyat	RCTI
2013	December	13	Konser Bank BJB	RCTI
2013	December	15	HUT 12 Tahun Transmedia	Trans TV
2013	December	15	HUT 12 Tahun Transmedia	Trans7
2013	December	16	Campur Campur	ANTV
2013	December	24	Konser Natal Keajaiban Kasih	RCTI
2013	December	27	Dahsyat	RCTI
2013	December	29	Entertainment News	NET.
2013	December	30	Halo Selebriti	SCTV
2014	January	01	Cek & Ricek	RCTI
2014	January	12	Dahsyat	RCTI
2014	January	12	Insert	Trans TV
2014	January	14	Road to Dahsyatnya Awards 2014	RCTI
2014	January	16	Entertainment News Malam	NET.
2014	January	19	Campur Campur	ANTV
2014	January	19	JKT48 2nd Anniversary Concert Part 1	ANTV
2014	January	21	Dahsyat Awards 2014	RCTI
2014	January	22	Entertainment News	NET.
2014	January	24	Entertainment News	NET.
2014	January	25	Entertainment News	NET.
2014	January	28	JKT48 3rd Generation Audition	RCTI
2014	January	29	Entertainment News	NET.
2014	January	30	Entertainment News	NET.
2014	January	30	Go Spot	RCTI
2014	February	02	Pesta Bintang Honda Mobilio	Trans TV
2014	February	06	Show Imah	Trans TV
2014	February	08	Entertainment News	NET.
2014	February	09	Entertainment News	NET.
2014	February	14	JKT48 2nd Anniversary Concert Part 2	ANTV
2014	February	15	Dahsyat	RCTI
2014	February	15	Tolak Angin Karnaval 2014	SCTV
2014	February	16	Mission X	Trans TV
2014	February	22	Dahsyat	RCTI
2014	February	24	Entertainment News	NET.
2014	February	25	Entertainment News	NET.
2014	February	28	HITS Music "Spesial Handshake Festival JKT48"	Sindo TV
2014	February	28	HITS Music "Spesial Handshake Festival JKT48"	MNC Music
2014	March	01	Dahsyat	RCTI
2014	March	02	Insert	Trans TV
2014	March	02	Metro Kini	Metro TV
2014	March	08	Yuk Keep Smile	Trans TV
2014	March	09	Dahsyat	RCTI
2014	March	06	Entertainment News	NET.
2014	March	08	Yuk Keep Smile	Trans TV
2014	March	09	Dahsyat	RCTI
2014	March	09	City Events	O Channel
2014	March	16	Pesbukers	ANTV
2014	March	18	Newstar	Kompas TV
2014	March	18	Entertainment News	NET.
2014	March	19	Entertainment News	NET.
2014	March	19	Most Pop Solopos.com	Solopos TV
2014	March	22	Dahsyat	RCTI
2014	March	23	Lensa Bisnis	Metro TV
2014	March	24	Hut Dahsyat	RCTI
2014	March	25	Obsesi	Global TV
2014	March	25	Entertainment News	NET.
2014	March	27	HOT Issue	Indosiar
2014	March	28	Entertainment News	NET.
2014	March	29	Insert	Trans TV
2014	March	30	HUT antv	ANTV
2014	April	05	Pesbukers	ANTV
2014	April	06	Dahsyat	RCTI
2014	April	13	Entertainment News	NET.
2014	April	14	Pesbukers	ANTV
2014	April	14	Campur Campur	ANTV
2014	April	18	Eagle Awards Documentary	Metro TV
2014	April	19	Dahsyat	RCTI
2014	April	19	Yuk Keep Smile	Trans TV
2014	April	23	Obsesi	Global TV
2014	April	23	Global Seru Awards 2014	Global TV
2014	April	23	Entertainment News	NET.
2014	April	26	Pemilihan Member Single ke-6 JKT48	ANTV
2014	May	03	Langit Rajawali	Rajawali Televisi
2014	May	03	TEMPURA (Tempur Antar Warga)	Global TV
2014	May	03	Entertainment News	NET.
2014	May	04	Seleb.Kom	Rajawali Televisi
2014	May	08	Entertainment News	NET.
2014	May	10	Dahsyat	RCTI
2014	May	11	Behind The Scene Langit Rajawali	Rajawali Televisi
2014	May	14	Ini Talkshow	NET.
2014	May	17	Dahsyat	RCTI
2014	May	20	Entertainment News	NET.
2014	May	21	Entertainment News	NET.
2014	May	24	Campur Campur	ANTV
2014	May	25	Yuk Keep Smile	Trans TV
2014	May	25	Entertainment News	NET.
2014	May	25	Dahsyat	RCTI
2014	May	29	Indonesia Dalam Angka	Rajawali Televisi
2014	June	05	Was Was	SCTV
2014	June	06	Status Selebritis	SCTV
2014	June	07	Dahsyat	RCTI
2014	June	07	Was Was	SCTV
2014	June	07	Hot Shot	SCTV
2014	June	08	Selebrita	Trans7
2014	June	08	Hot Shot	SCTV
2014	June	08	Entertainment News	NET.
2014	June	09	Was Was	SCTV
2014	June	12	Seleb.Kom	Rajawali Televisi
2014	June	13	Indonesian Kids Choice Awards 2014	Global TV
2014	June	19	AMI Awards 2014	RCTI
2014	June	16	Seleb on Cam	Global TV
2014	June	23	Obsesi	Global TV
2014	June	27	Konser Terbaik Terbaik AMI Award 2014	RCTI
2014	June	30	Ini Sahur	NET.
2014	July	02	Entertainment News	NET.
2014	July	16	Sarah Sechan	NET.
2014	July	01-17	Ini Sahur	NET.
2014	August	09	Weekend List	NET.
2014	August	10	Bukan Sekedar Wayang	NET.
2014	August	11	Ini Talkshow	NET.
2014	August	17	Ini Talkshow	NET.
2014	August	21	Ini Talkshow	NET.
2017	May	19	Pesta Sahabat	Rajawali Televisi
2018	July	01	Inbox	SCTV

=== International licensed television show ===
Name	Date aired	TV channel	Production company(s)	Distributor	Information	Members
New Famili 100	6 November 2014	Indosiar	FremantleMedia	PT Dunia Visitama Produksi	Guessing survey results against Super Girlies	Devi Kinal Putri, Thalia, Haruka Nakagawa, Della Delila, Beby Chaesara Anadila
Super Family 100	20 February 2016	ANTV	FremantleMedia	PT Dunia Visitama Produksi	Guessing survey results against The Rempongz team	Melody Nurramdhani Laksani, Nabilah Ratna Ayu Azalia, Haruka Nakagawa, Jessica Veranda, Maria Genoveva Natalia Desy Purnamasari Gunawan
Celebrity Lipsync Battle Indonesia	10 July 2016	NET.	Spike TV	Viacom Media Networks	Displays the expression and behavior of the members of JKT48 at the time of their favorite song lipsync.	Jessica Vania Widjaja, Devi Kinal Putri, Shania Junianatha
Indonesian Idol Junior	15 January 2017	MNCTV	19 Entertainment; FremantleMedia	PT Dunia Visitama Produksi	Being a guest star in the biggest kids talent shows by performing songs Saikou Ka yo (Luar Biasa) in the first segment and Mae Shika Mukanee (Hanya Lihat Kedepan) in the third segment.	Senbatsu Saikou Ka yo (Luar Biasa) with little member changes.
Indonesian Idol Junior	11 March 2017	MNCTV	19 Entertainment; FremantleMedia	PT Dunia Visitama Produksi	Being a guest star in the biggest kids talent shows by performing songs Fortune Cookie Yang Mencinta and Koko ga Rhodes da, Koko de Tobe! (part of the single So Long!) for the first time in Indonesian television.	Senbatsu So Long!
I Can See Your Voice Indonesia	23 May 2017	MNCTV	CJ Entertainment	CJ E&M Corporation	The JKT48 member will guess whether the contestant's singing is good or not, and the chance to duet with the contestants to choose from.	Melody Nurramdhani Laksani, Jessica Veranda, Shania Gracia, Ayana Shahab, Adhisty Zara, Ratu Vienny Fitrilya, Shani Indira Natio, Rona Anggreani
The Price is Right Indonesia	23 July 2017	RCTI	FremantleMedia	PT Dunia Visitama Produksi	Member JKT48 will be tested his knowledge about goods prices.	35 members of JKT48 (including those playing in the main challenges are Adhisty Zara, Nabilah Ratna Ayu Azalia, Devi Kinal Putri, Shania Junianatha, Melody Nurramdhani Laksani, Della Delila)
Minute to Win It Indonesia	18 September 2017	MNCTV	Friday TV; Endemol Shine Group	NBCUniversal	The members JKT48 compete to win prizes by challenging 10 games in less than 1 minute with simple household goods.	Melody Nurramdhani Laksani
Takeshi's Castle Indonesia	7 November 2017	MNCTV	Tokyo Broadcasting System Television, Inc.	TBS International	JKT48 members race to destroy the Takeshi's castle by going through various obstacles.	Semua member JKT48
