= List of awards and nominations received by JKT48 =

JKT48 awards and nominations
Awards and nominations
Award	Wins	Nominations
100% Ampuh Awards	1	1
Anugerah Musik Indonesia	2	9
Bintang RPTI Awards	2	2
Dahsyatnya Awards	6	8
Global Seru Awards	2	2
Hai Reader's Poll Music Awards	9	12
JPopAsia Music Awards	0	2
KLIK! Awards	1	1
Nickelodeon Indonesia Kids' Choice Awards	3	3
Nickelodeon Kids' Choice Awards	1	1
SCTV Awards	0	1
SCTV Music Awards	0	4
Selebrita Awards	1	1
Showbiz Indonesia Awards	1	1
World Music Awards	3	6
Yahoo! OMG Awards	3	5
Indonesian Digital Awards	1	1

Totals (Note: Certain award groups do not simply award one winner. They acknowledge several different recipients, have runners-up, and have third place. Since this is a specific recognition and is different from losing an award, runner-up mentions are considered wins in this award tally. For simplification and to avoid errors, each award in this list has been presumed to have had a prior nomination.)
- Wins: 40
- Nominations: 71

JKT48 is an Indonesian idol group whose name is derived from its based city of Jakarta and the Japanese idol group, AKB48. This is list awards received by JKT48:

== 100% Ampuh Awards ==
The 100% Ampuh Awards are an awards ceremony were presented by 100% Ampuh and first established in 2013 on Global TV, to awarded for achievement artist who to be appreciated in music. JKT48 has received one award.

Year	Nominee / work	Award	Result	Ref.
2013	JKT48	Best Girlband	Won	

== Anugerah Dangdut Indonesia ==
First established in 2015 on MNCTV, the Anugerah Dangdut Indonesia are an annual dangdut music awards were giving to honour and recognized for talent singer/musician in dangdut field. JKT48 has received one award.

Year	Nominee / work	Award	Result	Ref.
2015	JKT48	Most Popular Dangdut Friend	Won	

== Anugerah Musik Indonesia ==
The Anugerah Musik Indonesia (Indonesian translation: Indonesian Music Awards), is an annual Indonesian major music awards. They have been compared to the American Grammy Awards and British Brit Awards. The award was formalized in 1997 by ASIRI (Association of Indonesia Recording Industry), PAPPRI (Association of Indonesian Singers, Songwriters and Music Record Producers), and KCI (Copyright Office of Indonesia). It is the highest music awards given to outstanding artists in Indonesia. JKT48 has received two awards from 12 nominations.

Year	Nominee / work	Award	Result	Ref.
2013	JKT48	Best Pop Vocal Group	Nominated	
2013	JKT48	Best of the Best Newcomer	Nominated	
2014	JKT48	Best Pop Vocal Group	Nominated	
2014	"River"	Best Vocal Group Production Work	Won	
2015	"Papan Penanda Isi Hati"	Best Vocal Group Production Work	Nominated	
2015	JKT48	Best Pop Vocal Group	Won	
2016	JKT48	Best Pop Vocal Group	Nominated	
2016	"Hanya Lihat Kedepan"	Best Vocal Group Production Work	Nominated	
2017	"JKT Festival"	Best Vocal Group Production Work	Nominated	
2017	JKT48	Best Pop Vocal Group	Nominated	
2020	"Rapsodi"	Best Vocal Group Production Work	Nominated	
2021	"Cara Ceroboh untuk Mencinta (Darashinai Aishikata)"	Best Vocal Group Production Work	Nominated	
2022	"Flying High"	Best Vocal Group Production Work	Nominated	
2023	"Ponytail To Shu-Shu (Ponytail dan Shu-Shu)"	Best Vocal Group Production Work	Nominated	

== Bintang RPTI Awards ==
Year	Nominee / work	Award	Result	Ref.
2013	JKT48 Missions	Favorite Teen Television Show Program	Won	—
2014	JKT48	Favorite Star Advertisement	Won	—

== Dahsyatnya Awards ==
First established in 2009, the Dahsyatnya Awards are annual music awards were presented by the daily Indonesian TV show Dahsyat, to honour for talent singer/musician who had appointed to be outstanding (Indonesian: Terdahsyat). JKT48 has received six awards from 8 nominations.

Year	Nominee / work	Award	Result	Ref.
2013	JKT48	Outstanding Newcomer	Won	
2013	JKT48	Outstanding Stage Act	Nominated	
2014	"River"	Outstanding Song	Won	
2014	JKT48	Outstanding Collaboration Duo/Group	Won	
2014	JKT48	Outstanding Stage Act	Won	
2015	JKT48	Outstanding Duo/Group	Won	
2015	JKT48	Outstanding Most Diligently Performance Artist	Nominated	
2016	JKT48	Outstanding Duo/Group	Won	

== Global Seru Awards ==
The Global Seru Awards are awarded to celebrities who have caught the attention of the public through interesting or exciting accomplishments. JKT48 has received two awards.

Year	Nominee / work	Award	Result	Ref.
2014	JKT48	Most Exciting Action Stage	Won	
2014	"Fortune Cookie Yang Mencinta"	Most Exciting Song	Won	

== Hai Reader's Poll Music Awards ==
The Hai Reader's Poll Music Awards were created by Hai magazine on 2008, to recognized talent artist in music, based on voted by fans in website. JKT48 has received nine awards from 12 nominations.

Year	Nominee / work	Award	Result	Ref.
2012	"Heavy Rotation"	Best Single	Won	
2012	JKT48	Best Costume	Won	
2012	JKT48	Best Stage Performance	Won	
2012	JKT48	Best Freshmeat	Won	
2012	JKT48	Best of the Best	Won	
2013	Perkenalkan, Nama Kami JKT48	Best Concert	Won	
2013	"Fortune Cookie Yang Mencinta"	Best Single	Won	
2013	JKT48	Best Costume	Won	
2013	JKT48	Best Freshmeat	Won	
2013	JKT48	Best Stage Act	Nominated	
2014	"Papan Penanda Isi Hati"	Best Single	Nominated	
2015	"Halloween Night"	Best Single	Nominated	

== Indonesian Social Media Awards ==
Created in 2016 by SCTV, the Indonesian Social Media Awards is an annual award for celebrities who have become trending topics in various social media.

Year	Nominee / work	Award	Result	Ref.
2016	Melody JKT48	Female Celeb Twitter	Nominated	

== JawaPos.com Group Awards ==
The JawaPos.com Readers Choice Awards was an online awards have first established in 2017 by newspaper Jawa Pos, to honour for public figure in music, film and entertainment. JKT48 has received two awards.

Year	Nominee / work	Award	Result	Ref.
2016	JKT48	Best Group/Duo Singer	Won	
2017	JKT48	Favorite Group/Band	Won	

== JPopAsia Music Awards ==
JPopAsia Music Awards is the largest online Asian music awards with its nominees picked by online community.

Year	Nominee / work	Award	Result	Ref.
2012	"Heavy Rotation"	Best Single	Nominated	
2012	"Heavy Rotation"	Best Music Video	Nominated	

== KLIK! Awards ==
The KLIK! Awards was an awards ceremony were established in 2011 and presented by program KLIK!, to honour for artist and clip makers in music. JKT48 has received one award.

Year	Nominee / work	Award	Result	Ref.
2013	"Heavy Rotation"	Favorite Newcomer	Won	

== Mom & Kids Awards ==
First launched in 2016 by MNCTV, the Mom & Kids Awards are awards was appreciate for artists which have been inspiration from mother and kids. JKT48 has received two awards.

Year	Nominee / work	Award	Result	Ref.
2015	JKT48	Favorite Group/Duo/Band	Won	
2016	JKT48	Favorite Idol Singer	Won	

== Nickelodeon Kids' Choice Awards ==
=== Nickelodeon Indonesia Kids' Choice Awards ===
Nickelodeon Indonesia Kids' Choice Awards is the Indonesian version of Nickelodeon Kids' Choice Awards, held since 2008 in Jakarta. JKT48 received three awards.

Year	Nominee / work	Award	Result	Ref.
2013	JKT48	Favorite Boyband/Girlband	Won	
2014	JKT48	Favorite Boyband/Girlband	Won	
2015	JKT48	Favorite Group/Band/Duo	Won	

=== Nickelodeon Kids' Choice Awards (U.S.) ===
Nickelodeon Kids' Choice Awards (U.S.) is an annual awards show that airs on the Nickelodeon cable channel, which airs live and is usually held and telecast live on a Saturday night in late March or early April, that honors the year's biggest television, movie, and music acts, as voted by Nickelodeon viewers. Winners receive a hollow orange blimp figurine. JKT48 has received one award.

Year	Nominee / work	Award	Result	Ref.
2015	JKT48	Favorite Asian Act	Won	

== Oz Radio Bandung FM Awards ==
The Oz Radio Bandung FM Awards are an online radio awards were presented by OZ Radio FM, for talent musician/singer who have listed of 'friendly' in music.

Year	Nominee / work	Award	Result	Ref.
2018	JKT48	Most Friendly Duo/Group Singer	Pending	

== Panasonic Gobel Awards ==
The Panasonic Gobel Awards is an annual award presented to television programs and individual, based on poll results. The poll was originally conducted by the Indonesian tabloid, Citra, but was taken over by Nielsen Media Research in 2004.

Year	Nominee / work	Award	Result	Ref.
2016	JKT48 Ada Banyak Rasa	Favorite Special Event	Nominated	

== Piala Maya ==
Year	Nominee / work	Award	Result	Ref.
2023	Zee JKT48	Newcomer Actress of the Year	Nominated	

== SCTV Awards ==
Presented by SCTV since 2001, the SCTV Awards are an annual awards have been presenting for talent artists who had to be most popular (Indonesian: Paling Ngetop) in entertainment, based on audience votes.

Year	Nominee / work	Award	Result	Ref.
2014	JKT48	Most Famous Boyband/Girlband	Nominated	

== SCTV Music Awards ==
First established in 2003, the SCTV Music Awards are an annual music awards were presented by Indonesian TV station SCTV and have giving to honour for talent musician who had to be most popular (Indonesian: Ngetop), based on voting public through SMS.

Year	Nominee / work	Award	Result	Ref.
2013	JKT48	Most Famous Girlband	Nominated	
2014	JKT48	Most Famous Boyband/Girlband	Nominated	
2015	JKT48	Most Famous Boyband/Girlband	Nominated	
2016	JKT48	Most Famous Boyband/Girlband	Nominated	

== Selebrita Awards ==
The Selebrita Awards are an awards ceremony were established in 2013 and presented by the same-title program, to awarded for celebrity in entertainment. JKT48 has received one award.

Year	Nominee / work	Award	Result	Ref.
2013	JKT48	Newcomer of the Year	Won	

== Showbiz Indonesia Awards ==
Year	Nominee / work	Award	Result	Ref.
2014	JKT48	Band/Group of the Year	Won	

== World Music Awards ==
The World Music Awards is an international awards show founded in 1989 under the patronage of Albert II, Prince of Monaco and based in Monte Carlo. Awards are presented to the world's best selling artist in various categories and to the best-selling artist from each major territory. Sales figures are provided by the International Federation of the Phonographic Industry. JKT48 has received three awards from 6 nominations.

Year	Nominee / work	Award	Result	Ref.
2014	"Fortune Cookie Yang Mencinta"	World's Best Video	Nominated	
2014	JKT48	World's Best Live Act	Nominated	
2014	JKT48	World's Best Group	Nominated	
2014	JKT48	World's Best Indonesian Group (Voted)	Won	
2014	JKT48	World's Best Indonesian Live Act (Voted)	Won	
2014	"Fortune Cookie Yang Mencinta"	World's Best Indonesian Video (Voted)	Won	

== Yahoo! OMG Awards ==
The Yahoo! OMG Awards are an annual online awards were established on 2012 by Yahoo! Indonesia for celebrity in entertainment. JKT48 has received three awards from 5 nominations.

Year	Nominee / work	Award	Result	Ref.
2012	JKT48	Best Group	Won	
2013	JKT48	Best Group	Won	
2013	JKT48	Celeb with Most Die-Hard Fans	Won	
2014	Melody JKT48	Most Wanted Female	Nominated	
2014	Nabilah JKT48	Teenage Idol Girl	Nominated	
