= Haruka Nakagawa =

Indonesia-based Japanese musical artist

- 仲川 遥香
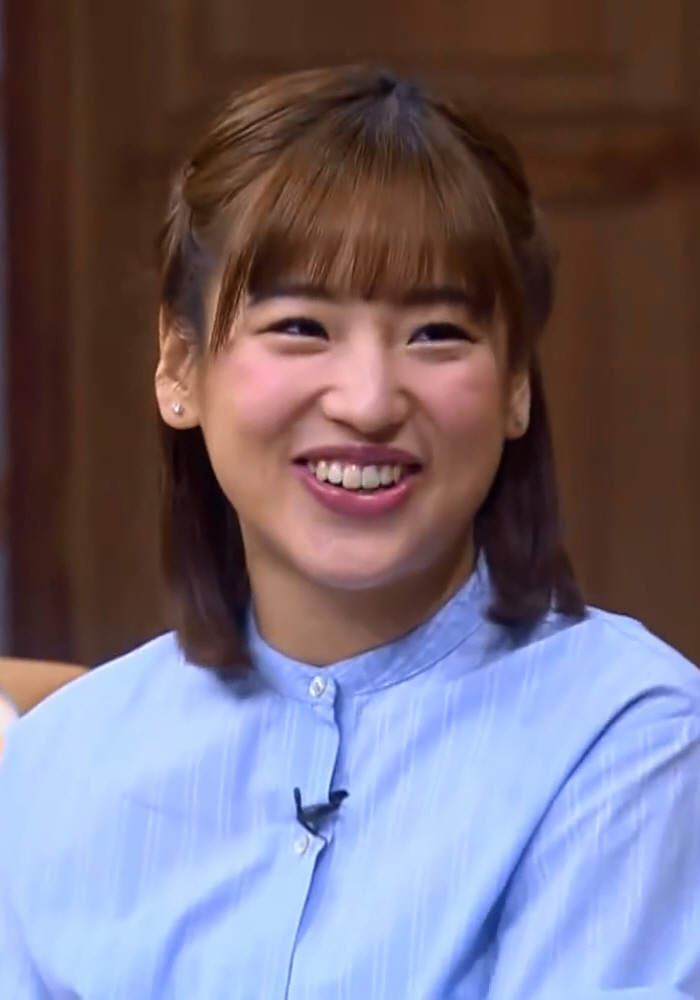
- Haruka Nakagawa in 2016
- Born: February 10, 1992 (age 34); Tokyo, Japan
- Other names: Harugon, Haruka, Harusan, Haruka JKT48, Harugon AKB48
- Occupations: Media personality, Consultant producer of JKT48, Idol (formerly), Singer
- Agents: Production Ogi (former); dentsuXentertainment (now IMN Talent Management) (current)
- Father: Shōgo Nakagawa
- Musical career
- Also known as: Harugon (はるごん), Haruka (はるか)
- Genre: J-pop
- Labels: King Records, Defstar Records, Hits Records, Dentsu Inter Admark Media Group Indonesia
- Formerly of: AKB48, Watarirouka Hashiritai, JKT48, 4 Gulali

Haruka Nakagawa (仲川 遥香, Nakagawa Haruka) is a Japanese media personality based in Indonesia. She is a former member of the Japanese idol group AKB48 and its sub-unit Watarirouka Hashiritai, as well as its Indonesian sister group JKT48, all produced by Yasushi Akimoto.

== Career ==
At the age of 14, Haruka Nakagawa participated in an audition for the addition of a 3rd Generation AKB48 member, and was accepted on 3 December 2006 as an AKB48 Team B. In October 2008, she was placed into a sub-unit named Okashina Sisters of AKB48 which is then renamed to Watarirouka Hashiritai with Ota Aika and Watanabe Mayu her fellow 3rd generation colleagues.

After the night of the 135th anniversary of Yomiuri Shimbun AKB 104 Senbatsu Member Sokaku Matsuri, 23 August 2009, the AKB48 personnel overhaul was announced. Haruka Nakagawa was promoted to AKB48's Team A since October 2009 and started going upstage as a member of Team A since 27 July 2010. On 24 August 2012, the first day of its Tokyo Dome concert series, AKB48 announced a reorganization of its teams. Haruka Nakagawa and Aki Takajo were sent to Jakarta to help AKB48's sister group, JKT48.

As the new AKB48 formation began on 1 November 2012, Haruka Nakagawa was officially transferred to JKT48 since that date. The Diversified Events on RCTI on 9 December 2012 was her first appearance as a member of JKT48. At JKT48's 1st anniversary concert in Gelora Bung Karno Sports Complex on 23 December 2012, Nakagawa was included in Team J together with Takajo and all of the 22 surviving first generation members of JKT48. Nakagawa performed with Team J on the first day of Renai Kinshi Jourei performance at JKT48 Theater on 26 December 2012.

Within a year, Haruka Nakagawa had appeared in 20+ TV commercials and several TV dramas in Indonesia. She also got the center position for JKT48's "Fortune Cookie Yang Mencinta" (Koisuru Fortune Cookie, 恋するフォーチュンクッキー, "The Fall-in-Love Fortune Cookie") MV that was released on 21 August 2013. Nakagawa also taught and guided her fellow JKT48 colleagues.

On 9 February 2014, AKB48's sub-unit Watarirouka Hashiritai held their last concert and the sub-group finally broke up. On 28 December 2014, she joined a new sub-unit of JKT48 named 4 Gulali and is the first sub-group from JKT48 that was formed. Previously, the officials asked the fans for help to contribute by giving ideas of what will become the project's name with the #NAMAHARUKAPROJECT (Haruka's Project Name) tag on Twitter. Members and costumes for the group were determined and decided by Nakagawa herself. They successfully performed their single "Chu Chu Chu Only For You" (Kimi Dake ni Chu! Chu! Chu!) And "Be Yourself" (Jibun Rashisa) at JKT48 3rd Anniversary at Tennis Indoor Senayan, Saturday 27 December 2014.

At the JKT48 Concert Show Hour Setlist Best 30 2016 held on 27 February 2016 at Balai Sarbini, Jakarta, Haruka Nakagawa announced her graduation from JKT48. Not only graduating from JKT48, because Haruka Nakagawa did not want to go back to Japan after graduating from JKT48, she also decided to graduate from the 48 Group. Nakagawa had a farewell concert in Surabaya on 3 June 2016. In a concert titled "Wayahe Suroboyo, Rek!" (Javanese: "It's Time for Surabaya, Guys!") Haruka Nakagawa has also given a special gift, which is cycling for 800 km from Jakarta to Surabaya from 23 May to 3 June 2016. For that, she were crowned the title, "Sang Legenda JKT48" (The Legend of JKT48). On 17 December 2016, Haruka Nakagawa held her graduation concert as well as the 5th anniversary of JKT48 at Trans Luxury Convention Center in Bandung, West Java. On 30 December 2016, Haruka Nakagawa held her graduation performance on the old Team T's side "Holding My Hand" and a new Team J until she was graduated from JKT48. She then also received another title as "Senior JKT48" (JKT48's senior).

After graduating from JKT48, since early January 2017, Haruka Nakagawa started her solo career as a talent and actress under the management of dentsuXentertainment.

She is named one of the Top 10 "Most Influential Women on Twitter" in 2016 and 2017 by the social media analytics firm Brandwatch, placing above Britney Spears, Oprah Winfrey and Alicia Keys. She is the only Japanese person in the list.

In 2018, she is appointed as an ambassador of the "Commemoration of 60 Years of Diplomatic Relations between Japan and Indonesia" and also the ambassador of Goodwill between the two countries.

She is now famous both in Japan and Indonesia, and is also touted as the most famous Japanese in Indonesia in the modern era.

== Personal life ==
In 2011, Haruka Nakagawa revealed that her father is a former professional wrestler, leading fans to speculate that he is Koji Nakagawa of the Frontier Martial-Arts Wrestling promotion, despite the latter's denial; it is revealed much later that his name is Shōgo Nakagawa (仲川昇吾). On her 27th birthday, Haruka Nakagawa revealed on her Instagram account that her parents divorced when she was very young and she and her siblings used to live with their grandmother, and that she has lost contact with her mother.

Her sister died on 4 May 2019 at the age of 28.

On 5 March 2020, Haruka Nakagawa revealed that she was raised in foster care, and had previously lied about her upbringing due to fears it would negatively impact her career.

== Idol groups ==
- AKB48 (2006–2012)
- JKT48 (2012–2016)

=== Sub-unit ===
- Watarirouka Hashiritai (AKB48) (2008–2014)
- 4 Gulali (JKT48) (2014–2016)

== Discography ==
=== JKT48 A-sides ===
- River
- Yuuhi wo miteiru ka?
- Koisuru Fortune Cookie (center)
- Manatsu no Sounds Good!
- Flying Get
- Gingham Check
- Kokoro no Placard
- Kaze wa Fuiteiru
- Pareo wa Emerald
- Kibouteki Refrain
- Halloween Night
- Beginner
- Mae Shika Mukanee
- LOVE TRIP
- Saikou ka yo

=== JKT48 B-sides ===
- Sakura no Shiori (RIVER)
- Kimi ni Autabi Koi wo Suru (RIVER)
- Nagai Hikari (Yuuhi wo miteiru ka?)
- First Rabbit (Koi Suru Fortune Cookie)
- Fortune Cookie in Love (Koi Suru Fortune Cookie) (center)
- BINGO! (Manatsu no Sounds Good!)
- Summer Love Sounds Good! (Manatsu no Sounds Good!)
- Dareka no Tame ni (Flying Get)
- Shoujotachi yo (Flying Get)
- Boku wa Ganbaru (Gingham Check) (center)
- Sakura no Hanabiratachi (Gingham Check)
- Gingham Check (English Version) (Gingham Check)
- Kurumi to Dialogue (Kokoro no Placard)
- Message on a Placard (Kokoro no Placard)
- Juuryoku Sympathy (Kaze wa Fuiteiru)
- The Wind is Blowing (Kaze wa Fuiteiru)
- Takane no Ringo (Pareo wa Emerald)
- Pareo is Your Emerald (Pareo wa Emerald)
- Theater no Megami (Kibouteki Refrain)
- Refrain Full of Hope (Kibouteki Refrain)
- Teppen Tottande! (Halloween Night)
- Halloween Night (English Version) (Halloween Night)
- Suki! Suki! Skip! (Beginner)
- Beginner (English Version) (Beginner)
- Hashire! Penguin (Mae Shika Mukanee)
- Always Looking Straight Ahead (Mae Shika Mukanee)
- Aozora no Soba ni Ite (LOVE TRIP)
- LOVE TRIP (English Version) (LOVE TRIP)
- Yume no Kawa (Saikou ka yo) (center)
- HA! (Saikou ka yo)

=== AKB48 A-sides ===
- Heavy Rotation
- Chance no Junban

=== AKB48 B-sides ===
- Shonichi (Baby! Baby! Baby!)
- Shonichi (Namida Surprise!)
- Kimi no Koto ga Suki dakara (RIVER)
- Boku no YELL (Ponytail to Shushu) (center)
- Boku Dake no value (Beginner)
- Kurumi to Dialogue (Chance no Junban)
- Guuzen no Juujiro (Sakura no Ki ni Narou)
- Hito no Chikara (Everyday, Katyusha) (center with Sato Amina)
- Dakishimecha Ikenai (Flying Get)
- Kimi no Senaka (Kaze wa Fuiteiru)
- Rinjin wa Kizutsukanai (Ue Kara Mariko)
- Jung ya Freud no Baai (GIVE ME FIVE!)
- Gugutasu no Sora (Manatsu no Sounds Good!)
- Do Re Mi Fa Onchi (Gingham Check)
- Watashitachi no Reason (Eien Pressure)

=== Watarirouka Hashiritai 7 A-sides ===
- Hatsukoi Dash/Aoi Mirai
- Yaruki Hanabi
- Kanpeki Gu~no ne
- Akkanbe Bashi
- Seishun no Flag
- Gyu
- Valentine Kiss
- Hetappi Wink
- Kibou Sanmyaku
- Shounen yo Uso wo Tsuke!

=== Watarirouka Hashiritai 7 B-sides ===
- Tenohira (Gyu)
- Gomennasai (Gyu)
- So-Mi-So-Mi-La-Si-La (Valentine Kiss)
- Pajama Drive (Valentine Kiss)
- Mamma, Grazie! (Hetappi Wink)
- Bikini wa Niawanai (Hetappi Wink)
- Chikatetsu no Teddy boy (Hetappi Wink)
- Fuku wo Kita Ousama (Hetappi Wink)
- Inugo wo Hanaseru Otoko no Ko (Kibou Sanmyaku)
- Saru no Cymbal (Kibou Sanmyaku)
- Kimi wa Kangaeru (Shounen yo Uso wo Tsuke!)
- Renai Heavy-kyuu Champion (Shounen yo Uso wo Tsuke!)

=== 4 Gulali ===
- Kimi Dake ni Chu! Chu! Chu!
- Jibun Rashisa
- Kataomoi no Karaage
- Aisatsu Kara Hajimeyou

=== JKT48 albums ===
- Oogoe Diamond (Heavy Rotation)
- Gomen ne, SUMMER (Heavy Rotation)
- Hikoukigumo (Heavy Rotation)
- 365 Nichi no Kamihikouki (Mahagita – Kamikyokutachi)
- Seishun no Lap Time (Mahagita – Kamikyokutachi)
- JKT Festival (JKT48 Festival Greatest Hits)
- Nagiichi (JKT48 Festival Greatest Hits)
- Mirai no Tobira (JKT48 Festival Greatest Hits)

=== AKB48 albums ===
- Anata ga Ite Kureta kara (SET LIST ~Greatest Songs~ Kanzen ban)
- Kimi to Niji to Taiyou to (Kamikyokutachi)
- Overtake (Koko ni Ita koto)
- Koko ni Ita koto (Koko ni Ita koto)
- Hate (1830m)
- Aozora yo Sabishikunai ka? (1830m)
- After Rain (Tsugi no Ashiato)

=== Watarirouka Hashiritai albums ===
- Rouka wa Hashiruna!
- Watarirouka wo Yukkuri Arukitai

== Stage Units ==
B1 (Seishun Girls)

Fushidara na Natsu

B2 (Aitakatta)

Glass no I LOVE YOU

Senaka Kara Dakishimete

B3 (Pajama Drive)

Pajama Drive

B4 (Idol no Yoake)

Tengoku Yarou

A6 (Mokugekisha)

Saboten to Gold Rush

RS1 (Pajama Drive)

Junjou Shugi (Revival)

Temodemo no Namida (Revival)

J1 (Renai Kinshi Jourei)

Heart Gata Virus

J2 (Dareka no Tame ni)

Shinkirou

Seifuku ga Jama wo Suru

Surprise Stage (Boku no Taiyou)

Higurashi no Koi

J3 (Theater no Megami)

Candy

T1 (Te Wo Tsunaginagara)

Wimbledon e Tsureteitte

Kono Mune no Barcode

HW1 (Bunga Matahari)

Itoshisa no defense

Cinderella wa Damasarenai

JSS (Team J B•E•L•I•E•V•E Show)

Classmate

== Filmography ==
=== Films/Movies ===
- Three Day Boys (スリーデイボーイズ) (2009)
- Batsu Game (2010)
- Kusogaki no Kokuhaku (2012)
- Viva JKT48 (2014)

=== Drama series ===
- Majisuka Gakuen (TV Tokyo, 2010)
- Sakura Kara no Tegami: AKB48 Sorezore no Sotugyō Monogatari (NTV, 2011), herself
- Tsuri Keiji 2 "Ai to Kanashimi no Sakana Tachi" (TBS, 2011), Yui Kitasato
- Majisuka Gakuen 2 (TV Tokyo, 2011), as Haruka
- Sabadoru (TV Tokyo, 2012), herself
- BIMA Satria Garuda (RCTI, 2013), Maya
- Onigiri The Series (PocariID/Pocari Sweat Indonesia's YouTube Channel, 2017), as Hana
- Online Offline (Telkomsel/Telkom Digital's YouTube Channel, 2018), as Haruka

=== Variety Shows ===
- AKB 0-ji 59-fun! (AKB0じ59ふん!) ( 5–26 May 2008, Nippon Television)
- AKB48 Nemousu Terebi (Family Gekijo)
- Shukan AKB (10 July 2009 – , not fixed, TV Tokyo)
- AKBingo! (23 December 2009, 6 January, 3–17 March, 2/9 June 2010, Nippon Television)
- Naruhodo! High School (30 May 2010, Nippon Television)
- AKB Kousagi Dojo (17 May 2013)
- JKT48 Missions (23 June 2013 – Hiatus, Trans 7)
- JKT48 Story (31 August 2013 – 2 November 2013, RCTI)
- Ini Sahur (2014 – 2016, NET.)
- Ini Talkshow (2014 – 2015, 2017, NET.)
- IClub48 (11 October 2014 – 14 March 2015, NET.)
- Yokoso JKT48 (14 December 2014 – 8 March 2015, ANTV)
- Nippon Keren Deh (29 March 2015 – 21 June 2015, NET.)
- The Ichiban (13 December 2015 – , RTV)
- Baper ! (Frequently invited guest star, RCTI)
- AKB48 Show (5 November dan 17 December 2016, NHK World Premium)
- Rumah Uya (2017, Trans 7)
- Jalan-jalan ke Tohoku dan Hokkaido, Jepang (2017, RTV)
- Lapor Pak! (2021, Trans 7)
- Masakini Masakitu (2022, NET.)
- Game Zone Indonesia (2023, GTV/Fremantle)
- Hole in The Wall (2023, RCTI)
- Arisan (2023–2024, Trans 7)
- Family 100 (2023–2024, MNCTV)

=== Talkshows ===
- Ini Talkshow (NET.), as herself

Haruka Nakagawa always made an appearance on NET. TV, and always active since 2014 – 2017

== Radio ==
- TOKYO FM, Talk w/ Nakagawa Haruka & Takahashi Minami, 2016

== Commercials ==
- Pocari Sweat (Otsuka Pharmaceutical Co., Ltd. 大塚製薬株式会社)
- YAMAHA (Yamaha Co. ヤマハ株式会社)
- Laurier Go with Thin (Kao Corporation 花王株式会社)
- Pocky (Ezaki Glico Co., Ltd. 江崎グリコ株式会社)
- Bioré (Kao Corporation 花王株式会社)
- Lip Ice (Rohto Pharmaceutical Co., Ltd. ロート製薬株式会社)
- Rakuten.com (Rakuten, Inc. 楽天株式会社)
- IM3 (PT. INDOSAT, Tbk.)
- OXY (PT. OXY Indomed)
- Tolak Angin (PT. Industri Jamu dan Farmasi Sido Muncul, Tbk,)
- CHARM (PT. Uni-Charm Indonesia)
- HONDA (Honda Motor Co., Ltd. 本田技研工業株式会社)
- Aikatsu! Idol Activity アイカツ! アイドルカツドウ (Bandai Namco Entertainment Inc. 株式会社バンダイナムコゲームスエンターテインメント)
- KakaoTalk (Kakao Co. 주식회사 카카오)
- WakuWaku Japan (SKY Perfect JSAT Corporation, Inc. 株式会社スカパーJSATホールディングス)
- LINE (Line Corporation, Ltd. ライン株式会社)
- Ajinomoto 味の素 (Ajinomoto Co., Inc. 味の素株式会社)
- Bali Breeze (PT. Dion Farma Abadi, Natasha Group)
- Oronamin C Drink (Otsuka Pharmaceutical Co., Ltd. 大塚製薬株式会社)

== DVDs ==
Other DVD's

- Hashire Natsuyasumi (タイトル未定) (with Watarirouka Hashiritai) 2010.10.20

== Books ==
=== Japan ===
- ガパパ! (GaPaPa!) (20 November 2016) (ISBN 4907333145, 978-4907333140), 2016 Amazon.jp's Top 10 Best Seller
