= Watarirouka Hashiritai 7 =

Japanese female idol group

Watarirouka Hashiritai 渡り廊下走り隊
- Origin: Akihabara, Tokyo, Japan
- Genres: Pop
- Years active: 2009–2013
- Labels: Pony Canyon
- Past members: Haruka Nakagawa (JKT48); Ayaka Kikuchi; Aika Ota (HKT48); Mayu Watanabe Watarirouka Hashiritai 7 Mika Komori (2011–2013); Misaki Iwasa (2011–2013); Kazumi Urano (2012–2013); Natsumi Hirajima
- Website: watarirouka.com

Watarirouka Hashiritai (渡り廊下走り隊, Watarirō-ka Hashiri-tai; Corridor Running Team) was a Japanese female idol group, and a subgroup of Japanese female idol group AKB48. Under Pony Canyon, the group debuted in January 2009 with the double A-side single "Hatsukoi Dash/Aoi Mirai."

== History ==
In October 2008, Yasushi Akimoto announced that he was going to revive the 1980s girl group Ushirogami Hikaretai, using four members of AKB48 and was renaming the group to Watarirouka Hashiritai. The group debuted under Pony Canyon releasing a double A-side single, "Hatsukoi Dash/Aoi Mirai" on January 28, 2009. The single entered the Oricon single chart at number ten. On April 22, the group released their second single, "Yaruki Hanabi" which charted at number nine.

On November 11, 2009, the group released their third single "Kanpeki Gū no ne" which was used as the first ending theme song for the anime version of the manga Fairy Tail. This single had more success than the other two singles, as it sold over 23,200 copies in its first week and charted at number seven. In February 2010, Ayaka Kikuchi joined the group changing the roster from four members to five.

Their first single in 2010, "AkKanbe Bashi," became the first single from any AKB48 sub-unit to reach number 1 on the Oricon charts.

On June 30, 2010, two members from AKB48, Misaki Iwasa and Mika Komori, were added to Watarirouka Hashiritai to form "Watarirouka Hashiritai7", but the name applied to their "radio-only" activities, as two singles and an album released on and after June 30 were under the name of "Watarirouka Hashiritai", not as "7" since the two newcomers were not included. They eventually debuted as "7" with their seventh single "Valentine Kiss", a cover version of Sayuri Kokushō's single, originally written by Yasushi Akimoto and released 25 years earlier.

In mid-2011, Hirajima announced on the group's official blog that a new single would be released by the group on August 3 of that year. Kikuchi revealed on July 4, 2011, that the title of the song would be "Hetappi Wink". Both Hirajima and Kikuchi described it as "a summer-ish, energetic and bright song". This was the second time a single was released with the "7" in the group's name.

On June 25, 2012, Watarirouka Hashiritai 7 took part in Yubi Matsuri, an idol festival produced by Rino Sashihara from AKB48. The concert was held at Nippon Budokan before a crowd of 8,000 people and featured such girl groups as Idoling!!!, Shiritsu Ebisu Chugaku, Super Girls, Tokyo Girls' Style, Nogizaka46, Passpo, Buono!, and Momoiro Clover Z.

On August 24, 2012, during the AKB48 in TOKYO DOME ~1830m no Yume~ concert tour, it was announced that Aika Ota and Haruka Nakagawa were transferred to HKT48 and JKT48 respectively.

On November 13, 2013, it was revealed that the group would disband on Christmas and at the same time, release their first (and only) best-of album, titled "Watarirouka wo Yukkuri Arukitai".

On February 9, 2014, their final concert was held at ZeppDiver City, Tokyo.

== Members ==
- Haruka Nakagawa (仲川遥香) (JKT48 member on February 9, 2014)
- Ayaka Kikuchi (菊地あやか)
- Mayu Watanabe (渡辺麻友)
- Aika Ota (多田愛佳) (HKT48 member on February 9, 2014)
- Mika Komori (小森美果) (Watarirouka Hashiritai 7)
- Misaki Iwasa (岩佐美咲) (Watarirouka Hashiritai 7)

=== Provisional member ===
- Kazumi Urano (浦野一美) (Former AKB48 Team B member, SDN48 member) on March 10, 2012

=== Former Member ===
- Natsumi Hirajima (平嶋夏海)

== Discography ==
=== Albums ===
Year	Album information	Oricon Albums Charts	Reported sales
2010	Rouka wa Hashiru na! (廊下は走るな!; "Don't Run in the Corridors!"): Released: October 13, 2010; Label: Pony Canyon (PCCA-03276); Formats: CD, digital download	4	33,000

=== Singles ===
Release	Title	Chart positions			Oricon sales
Release	Title	Oricon Singles Charts	Billboard Japan Hot 100	RIAJ digital tracks	Oricon sales
2009	"Hatsukoi Dash/Aoi Mirai" (初恋ダッシュ／青い未来; "First Love Dash/Blue Future")	10	42	–	17,000
2009	"Yaruki Hanabi" (やる気花火; "Motivation Fireworks")	9	25	–	16,000
2009	"Kanpeki Gū no ne" (完璧ぐ～のね; "Perfect Partner")	7	43	–	32,000
2010	"AkKanbe Bashi" (アッカンベー橋; "Akanbe Bridge")	1	8	54	34,000
2010	"Seishun no Flag" (青春のフラッグ; "Youth Flag")	4	5	67	47,000
2010	"Gyu" (ギュッ; "Hug")	2	7	68	38,000
2011	"Valentine Kiss" (バレンタイン・キッス)	2	3	15	127,000
2011	"Hetappi Wink" (へたっぴウィンク; "Unskilled Wink")	2	4	TBA	98,000
2011	"Kibō Sanmyaku" (希望山脈; "Hope Mountain Range")	3	4	TBA	119,000
2012	"Shōnen yo Uso o Tsuke!" (少年よ 嘘をつけ!; "Boys, Tell a Lie!")	3	4	15	80,000
