= Heavy Rotation =

Heavy Rotation may refer to:

- Heavy rotation, the repeated airing of a limited playlist of songs or music videos
- Heavy Rotation (Anastacia album)
- Heavy Rotation (JKT48 album)
- "Heavy Rotation" (song), a song by AKB48
- Heavy Rotation, a 2006 album by Deceptikonz
- "Heavy Rotation", a song by Ciara from Basic Instinct
- "Heavy Rotation", a song by Soul Asylum from Hang Time
