= Sayuri Kokushō =

Japanese actress, singer, and tarento (born 1966)

- Also known as: Sayu-chan (さゆちゃん)
- Born: 國生さゆり; December 22, 1966 (age 59)
- Origin: Kanoya, Kagoshima, Japan
- Genre: J-pop
- Occupations: Singer, actress, tarento
- Years active: 1985–present
- Label: Sony Music Artists
- Website: http://www.sma.co.jp/artists/kokusyosayuri/

Sayuri Kokushō (国生さゆり or 國生さゆり, Kokusho Sayuri; born December 22, 1966 in Kanoya, Kagoshima Prefecture, Japan) is a Japanese actress, singer, and tarento. She was an original member of Onyanko Club. She works for the talent management firm Sony Music Artists. Her debut single, "Valentine Kiss", is the most popular Valentine's Day song in Japan.

== Brief biography ==
Kokushō was named after Sayuri Yoshinaga, of whom her father was a fan. After spending time living in Sasebo, Nagasaki when she was young, she attended Nishihara Elementary School and First Kanoya Junior High School, both Kanoya Municipal schools. She then attended Shimizugaoka High School in Kure, Hiroshima due to her father's transferring from JMSDF Kanoya Air Base to JMSDF Kure Naval Base while in the Japan Maritime Self-Defense Force.

While in high school, she represented the Chūgoku region in the 3rd Miss Seventeen Contest in 1984. While she didn't win the contest, she was scouted by a representative from CBS Sony (two others scouted at the same contest were Misato Watanabe and Shizuka Kudō. Kokushō later appeared on a radio show with Misato Watanabe in 1986.) She moved to Tokyo after becoming a beauty model for Shiseido and the CBS Sony representative suggested she enter the "High School Girl Special" contest on Fuji TV's All Night Fuji, where she made her television debut.

After winning the in-show beauty contest, she made her debut on Yūyake Nyan Nyan("Sunset Meow Meow") (夕やけニャンニャン) as a founding member of Onyanko Club. Because she was attending a high school in Hiroshima Prefecture at the time, she was described as being from Hiroshima. She was the captain of the track and field club during high school.

=== Onyanko Club era ===
On April 1, 1985, Kokushō made her professional debut as a founding member of Onyanko Club (member #8). Because she had already graduated from high school, she was senior to most of the other members of Onyanko Club and became the de facto leader of the group. However, the "public image" leaders of the group were promoted as being Eri Nitta, Miharu Nakajima (中島美春, Nakajima Miharu), Satomi Fukunaga, and Kazuko utsumi (内海和子, Utsumi Kazuko) . Kokushō continued to stand out as a leader of the group, however, even with publicity surrounding the solo debut of fellow member Sonoko Kawai.

Kokushō then had to determine whether she wanted to continue as a member of Onyanko Club or begin a solo career and leave the group. She received some support from Nitta and Kawai, both of whom had started successful solo careers of their own. She made her solo debut on February 1, 1986 with the single "Valentine Kiss", which was backed by Onyanko Club. The single reached No. 2 on the Oricon charts, No. 1 on the Music Lab and Music Research charts, and No. 4 on the music program The Best Ten (ザ・ベストテン) on TBS. The single also won the Japan Gold Disc Award for Best Single of the Year. In a 2006 survey in Japan, Oricon Style found "Valentine Kiss" to be the most popular Valentine's Day song. She was not, however, able to match the Oricon No. 1 position reached by Nitta and Kawai with their respective solo debut releases.

From November 2008 onwards, Kokushō has made sporadic appearances for professional wrestling promotion Oz Academy, working as the manager of the villainous Ozaki-gun alliance.

== Discography ==
=== Singles ===
Year	Title	Details	Peak chart position (Oricon)
1986	"Valentine Kiss" (with Onyanko Club) (バレンタイン・キッス)	Released: February 1, 1986; B-side: "Koi wa Ring Ring Ring" (恋はRing Ring Ring)	#2
1986	Natsu wo Matenai (夏を待てない)	Released: May 10, 1986; B-side: "Samba wo Odorasete" (サンバを躍らせて)	#1
1986	Noble Red no Toki (ノーブルレッドの瞬間(とき))	Released: August 14, 1986; B-side: "Mou Ichido Hashitte Koibito yo" (もう一度走って恋人よ)	#1
1986	Ano Natsu no Bike (あの夏のバイク)	Released: December 3, 1986; B-side: "Yoake made "Happy Birthday!"" (夜明けまで"Happy Birthday!")	#1
1987	Hoshikuzu no Sniper (星屑の狙撃手(スナイパー))	Released: March 11, 1987; B-side: "Kowareta Taiyou" (こわれた太陽)	#2
1987	Sore Ijou, Are Miman (ソレ以上、アレ未満)	Released: May 28, 1987; B-side: "Non-Fiction Shitai" (ノンフィクションしたい)	#2
1987	Koi wa Tooku kara (恋は遠くから)	Released: October 1, 1987; B-side: "Cordon Bleu Jealousy-aji" (コルドンブルー・ジェラシー風味(あじ))	#9
1988	Glass no Mori (ガラスの森)	Released: April 30, 1988; B-side: "WAIT!"	#34
2008	"Valentine Kiss 2008" (バレンタイン・キッス 2008)	Released: January 16, 2008; New version of the 1986 single; B-sides: "Valentine Kiss 2007", "Valentine Kiss"	#135

=== Albums ===
==== Studio albums ====
- Pep Talk (Pep Talk) (1986)
- BALANCE OF HEART (BALANCE OF HEART) (1987)
- SUMMER SNOW (1988)
- Sakana (album)|SAKANA (1989)

==== Compilation albums ====
- TRANSIT (1987)
- Aishuu -Still Loving- (愛執 -Still Loving-) (1988)
- Kokushō Sayuri Best Collection (国生さゆり ベストコレクション) (1997)
- GOLDEN BEST: Kokushō Sayuri SINGLES (GOLDEN☆BEST 国生さゆり SINGLES) (2002)
- Golden Idol Deluxe: Kokushō Sayuri (ゴールデン☆アイドル デラックス 国生さゆり) (2015)

== Filmography ==
=== Film ===
- Eureka (2000) as Yumiko
- One Week Friends (2017) as Shiho Fujimiya

=== Television ===
- Sukeban Deka II: The Legend of the Girl In The Iron Mask (1985) as Saori Kokobun
- The Way of the Househusband (2020) as Mother (episode 9)
