= Valentine Kiss =

1986 single by Sayuri Kokushō

Single by Sayuri Kokushō
- Released: February 1, 1986; January 6, 2008 (new version)
- Genre: J-pop
- Length: 3:34
- Label: CBS Sony
- Songwriter: Yasushi Akimoto

Sayuri Kokushō singles chronology
"Valentine Kiss" (1986)	"Natsu o Matenai" (1986)

"Valentine Kiss" (バレンタイン・キッス, Barentain Kissu) is the solo debut J-pop single from Sayuri Kokushō (though it was billed on the cover as "Sayuri Kokushō with Onyanko Club") released on February 1, 1986, by CBS Sony in Japan. Kokushō was the eighth member of Onyanko Club. The B-side song was "Koi wa Ring Ring Ring" (恋はRing Ring Ring).

The single ranked at number 2 on the Oricon charts, and was rated fourth most popular on music program The Best Ten on TBS. It was also awarded the Japan Gold Disc Award for Best Single of the Year.

While the title of the song is "Valentine Kiss", due to the often repeated chorus line of "Valentine Day kiss", the song is often called "Valentine Day Kiss".

"Valentine Kiss" was reproduced by Kokushō and resold in 2008 by Sony Music Direct. This remake reached number 135 on the Oricon charts.

== History ==
"Valentine Kiss" was the ending theme song for the Monday Drama Land series on Fuji TV in 1986. The single reached number 2 on the Oricon charts, number 1 on the Music Lab and Music Research charts, and number 4 on The Best Ten music program on TBS. The single also won the Japan Gold Disc Award for Best Single of the Year.

The song has become associated with Valentine's Day in Japan, and is regularly used in television programs and commercials which occur around that time. In a 2006 survey of people between 10 and 49 years of age in Japan, Oricon Style found Valentine Kiss to be the most popular Valentine's Day song, while it only sold 317,000 copies. The singles it beat in the ranking were number one selling "Love Love Love" from Dreams Come True (2,488,630 copies), "Valentine's Radio" from Yumi Matsutoya (1,606,780 copies), "Happy Happy Greeting" from the Kinki Kids (608,790 copies). The final song in the top five was "My Funny Valentine" by Miles Davis.

The makeup and hair styling featured in the cover image for the single were done by Kokushō herself. "Valentine Kiss" was sung in 1986 as a feature of the "Today is special..." segment of the Yūyake Nyan Nyan variety show hosted by Onyanko Club. The song was used in the February 14, 2009 "Valentine After School" episode of Chūgakusei Nikki as the opening theme, and Kokushō sang it as the ending theme song as well.

== Tracks ==
The album was a 45 rpm vinyl single with one song on each side:

1. "Valentine Kiss" (バレンタイン・キッス, Barentain Kissu) (3:34, lyrics by Yasushi Akimoto, composed by Hiroaki Sei, arranged by Jun Satō)
2. "Koi wa Ring Ring Ring" (恋はRing Ring Ring) (lyrics by Yasushi Akimoto, composed by Hideya Nakazaki, arranged by Jun Satō)

== Covers ==
=== Watarirouka Hashiritai ===
"Valentine Kiss"

Single by Watarirouka Hashiritai 7
- Released: February 2, 2011
- Recorded: 2011
- Genre: J-pop
- Length: 3:55
- Label: Pony Canyon
- Songwriter: Yasushi Akimoto
- Producer: Yasushi Akimoto

Watarirouka Hashiritai 7 singles chronology
"Gyu" (2010)	"Valentine Kiss" (2011)	"Hetappi Wink" (2011)

"Valentine Kiss" was recorded in 2011 by AKB48 sub-unit Watarirouka Hashiritai, under the name Watarirouka Hashiritai 7. The single debuted at number 2 on the Oricon weekly charts selling around 95,000 copies in its first week. Watarirouka Hashiritai 7's cover of the song is also the first to enter the top 10 and matched the original's ranking.

=== Other covers ===
"Valentine Kiss" has been covered many times since its release. The all-girl ska band The Kitchen Gorilla released an Onyanko Club cover album titled "Onyanko Punk Love" in November 2003 which featured a cover of "Valentine Kiss".

The song was covered as an ending theme song for the May 27, 2007, episode of the anime series Lucky Star, sung by the characters Tsukasa (Kaori Fukuhara) and Konata (Aya Hirano). It was also covered multiple times by multiple characters in the anime series The Prince of Tennis. From February 2004 through January 2013, a total of 13 different versions were released (seven individually, two together, another two together, and the final two alone), then continued well into the Reiwa era for a total of 21 different covers. The first one, featuring the character Keigo Atobe (voiced by Junichi Suwabe) reached number 14 on the Oricon charts.
