= JKT48 =

Indonesian idol group

- JKT48 logo

Background information
- Origin: Jakarta, Indonesia
- Genres: Indo pop; J-pop; pop rock; pop; teen pop; bubblegum pop; dangdut; jazz; ska
- Years active: 17 December 2011; 14 years ago
- Member of: AKB48 Group
- Members: See list
- Website: jkt48.com

PT Indonesia Musik Nusantara
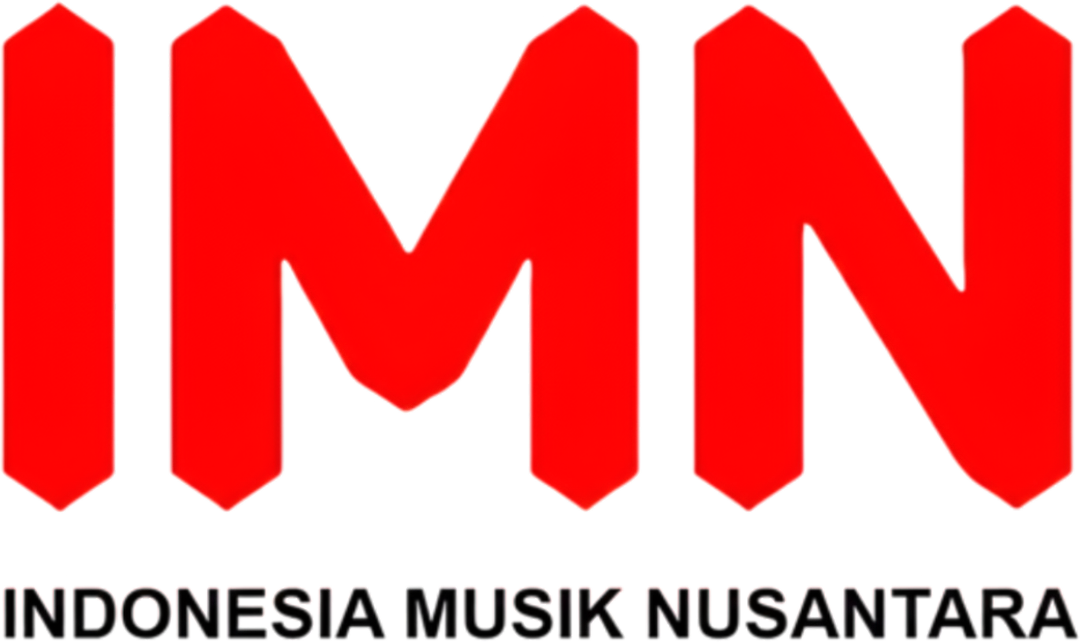
- Indonesia Musik Nusantara logo (since March 2025)
- Trade name: Indonesia Musik Nusantara (IMN, (parent company); JKT48 (main musical group)
- Formerly: PT Dentsu Inter Admark Media Group Indonesia (2011–2022) (via JKT48 Project (2011–2018) and DentsuX Entertainment (2018–2022))
- Type: Limited liability company
- Industry: Music, entertainment
- Genre: Music, dance, entertainment
- Founded: 11 September 2011; 15 years ago (first announced); 2 November 2011; 15 years ago (first generation announced); 17 December 2011; 14 years ago (first debut, set as its anniversary); 8 September 2012; 14 years ago (JKT48 Theater)
- Founders: Yasushi Akimoto; Harris Thajeb; Reino Barack
- Headquarters: Office) Menara Global 3rd floor, Jl. Jenderal Gatot Subroto Kav. 27, Kuningan Timur, Setiabudi, South Jakarta 12950 (JKT48 Theater) fX Sudirman 4th floor, Jl. Jenderal Sudirman No. 1, RT.1/RW.3, Gelora, Tanah Abang, Central Jakarta, Jakarta, Indonesia
- Area served: Indonesia and worldwide
- Key people: Nariaki Terada (CEO of Superball); Winston Utomo (IDN CEO); William Utomo (IDN COO; Ryo Kenjo (head of JKT48); Fritz Fernandez (JKT48 general manager); Melody Nurramdhani Laksani (JKT48 Theater general manager); Shani Indira Natio (JKT48 Theater vice general manager); Toshiaki Gomi (JKT48 creative director); Aokuri (JKT48 creative producer); Raden Rara Freyanashifa Jayawardana (JKT48 captain)
- Products: JKT48 Official Merchandise
- Owners: Dentsu Inter Admark Media Group Indonesia (Dentsu International) (2011–2022); Global Mediacom (MNC Asia Holding) (2011–2021, indirectly); IDN (2022–present)
- Members: 59 (30 August 2026)
- Parent: Dentsu Inter Admark Media Group Indonesia (Dentsu International) (2011–2022); IDN (2022–present) (via Indonesia Creator Economy (2022–present)); Licence: Vernalossom (2011–present) (via Superball (2023–present))
- Divisions: JKT48 Theater (2012–present); JKT48 Team J (2012–2021); JKT48 Team KIII (2013–2021); JKT48 Team T (2015–2019, 2020–2021); IMN Talent Management (2016–present); JKT48 Academy (2018–2021); PAPION (2025–present); JKT48 Team Love (2026–present); JKT48 Team Dream (2026–present); JKT48 Team Passion (2026–present)
- Website: jkt48.com

JKT48 (pronounced J-K-T-forty-eight) is Indonesia's idol girl group, established in 2011 as the first international sister group of Japan's AKB48. Based in Jakarta, the group blends music, fan interaction, and performance. They adopted the concept of "idols you can meet" before switching to "idols that come to meet you" in April 2018.

The group opened its theater, on the fourth floor of the fX Sudirman shopping mall in Central Jakarta, on 8 September 2012. Fans can attend daily performances, which are subject to change.

Although JKT48 membership is not limited to any nationality, applicants must be Indonesian residents. As of 30 August 2026, the group has 59 members.

JKT48 released its first studio album, Heavy Rotation on Hits Records (a division of MNC subsidiary PT Star Media Nusantara) on 16 February 2013. The group typically performs songs by AKB48 and other sister groups by translating their songs into Indonesian. They released their first original single, "Rapsodi", in January 2020.

== Conception ==
Much like AKB48, the female Japanese idol group formed in 2005 in Akihabara, Tokyo, JKT48 is based on the concept of idols with whom fans can greet and develop connections. The group's name is derived from its base city of Jakarta, Indonesia. The country was seen as a potential idol market because of its relatively-young population and the popularity of Japanese manga series. Producer Yasushi Akimoto and Dentsu Media Group Indonesia partnered with Rakuten and Global Mediacom, the country's largest media conglomerate. In an interview on CNN's TalkAsia, Akimoto explained why he selected Indonesia as the first target of AKB48's overseas expansion:

People in Indonesia were interested in AKB48. That is why we decided to try it in Jakarta. Kids watched AKB on the internet and they want to do the same, but they don't know whether they have talent. Also, it's difficult [for them] to go to Japan to audition.

== History ==
=== 2011–2012: Formation ===
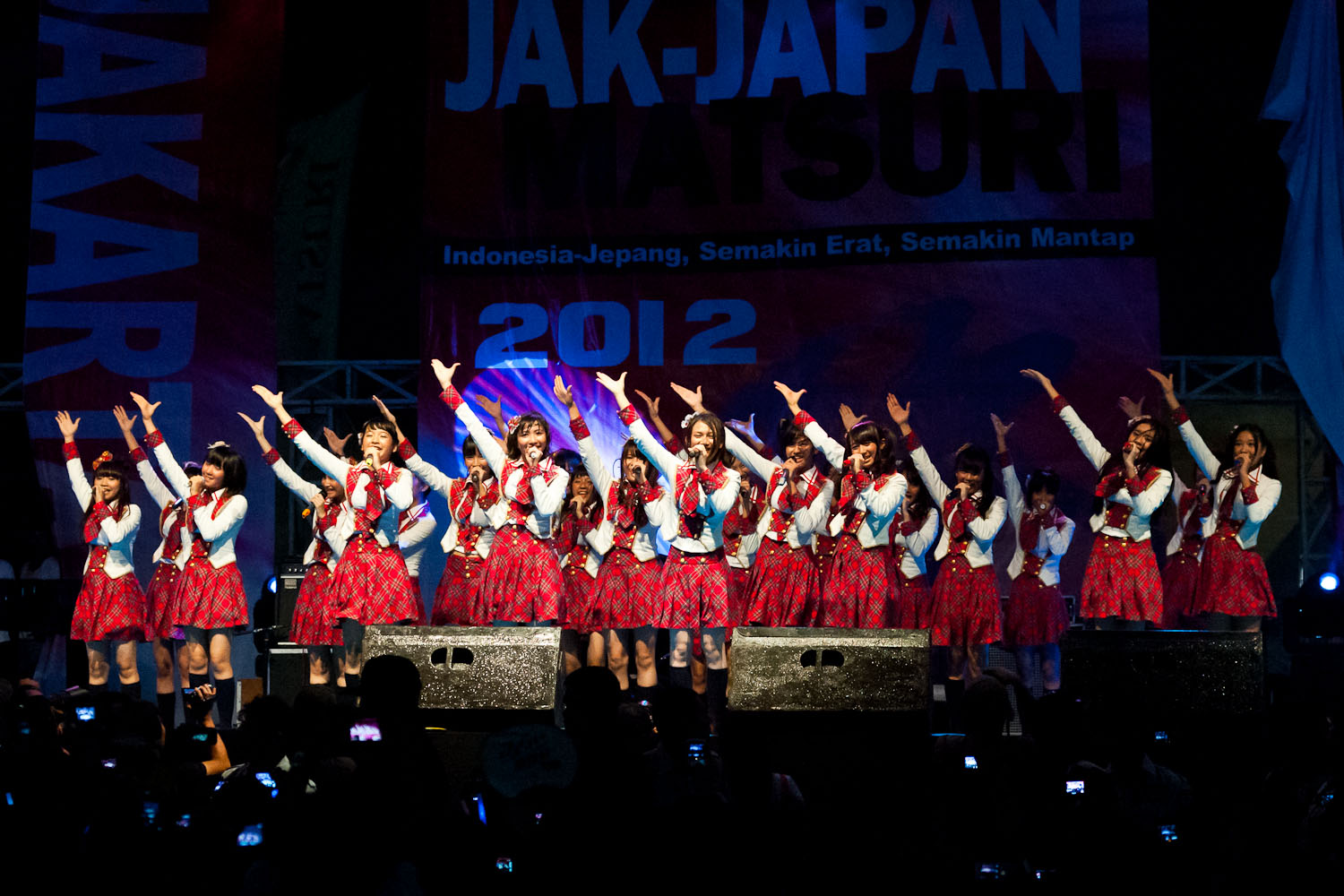
JKT48 performing in September 2012

On 11 September 2011, the formation of JKT48 was announced at an AKB48 event at Makuhari Messe in Chiba, Japan. Applicants were interviewed over the next few weeks, and the first auditions were held on 8–9 October. AKB48 member Minami Takahashi visited Jakarta during the auditions to promote JKT48 among fans of AKB48. Although applicants did not have to be Indonesian citizens, they had to be Indonesian residents. Approximately 1,200 girls auditioned for the group, and 51 were selected for the second round. Finalists were judged based on their dance performance of AKB48's "Heavy Rotation" and their performance of a song of their choice. JKT48's 28 first-generation members, aged 12 to 21, were selected on 2 November. The group made its first public appearance on Global TV's 17 December live-music program 100% Ampuh, performing "Heavy Rotation" with Indonesian lyrics.

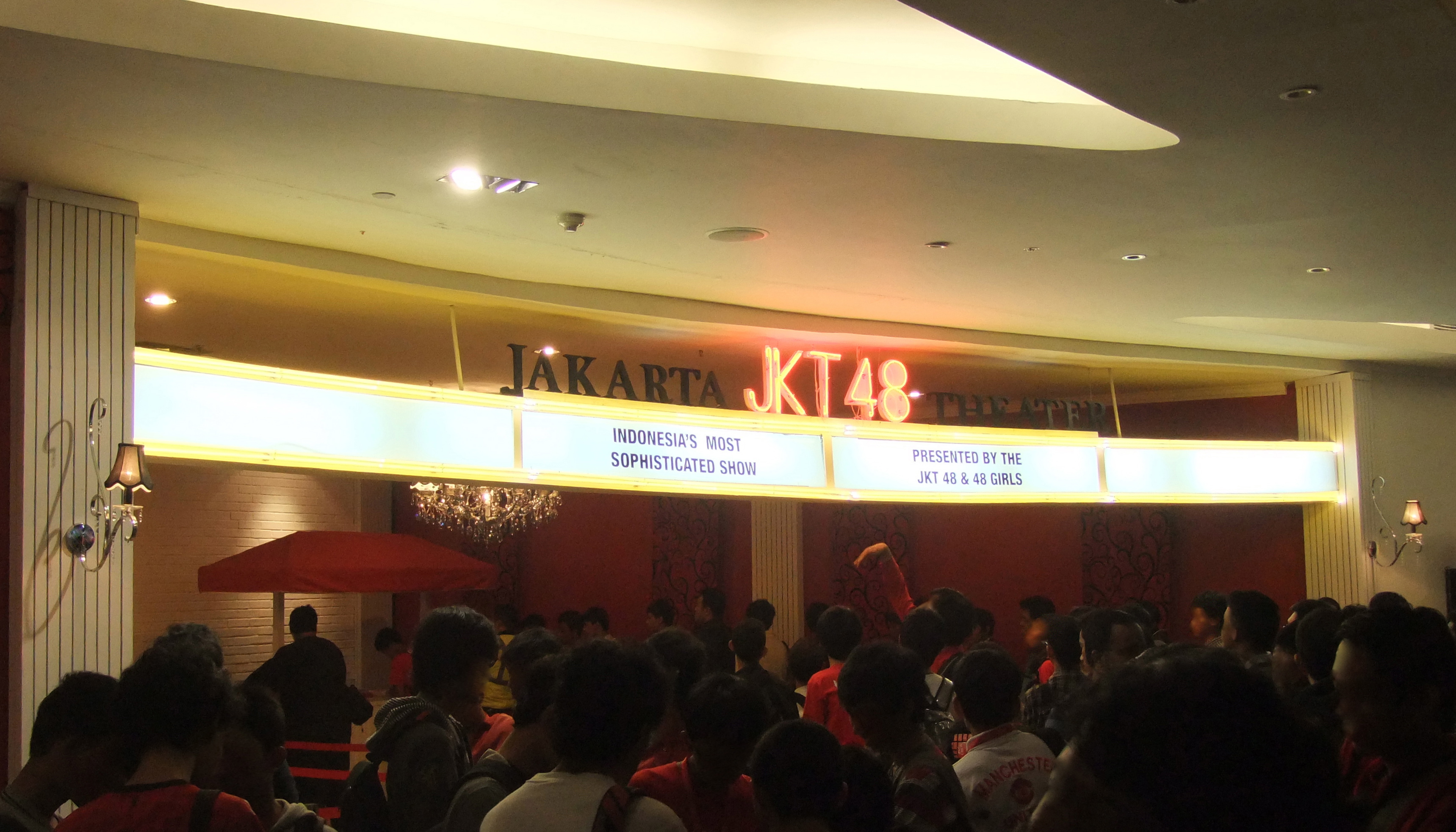
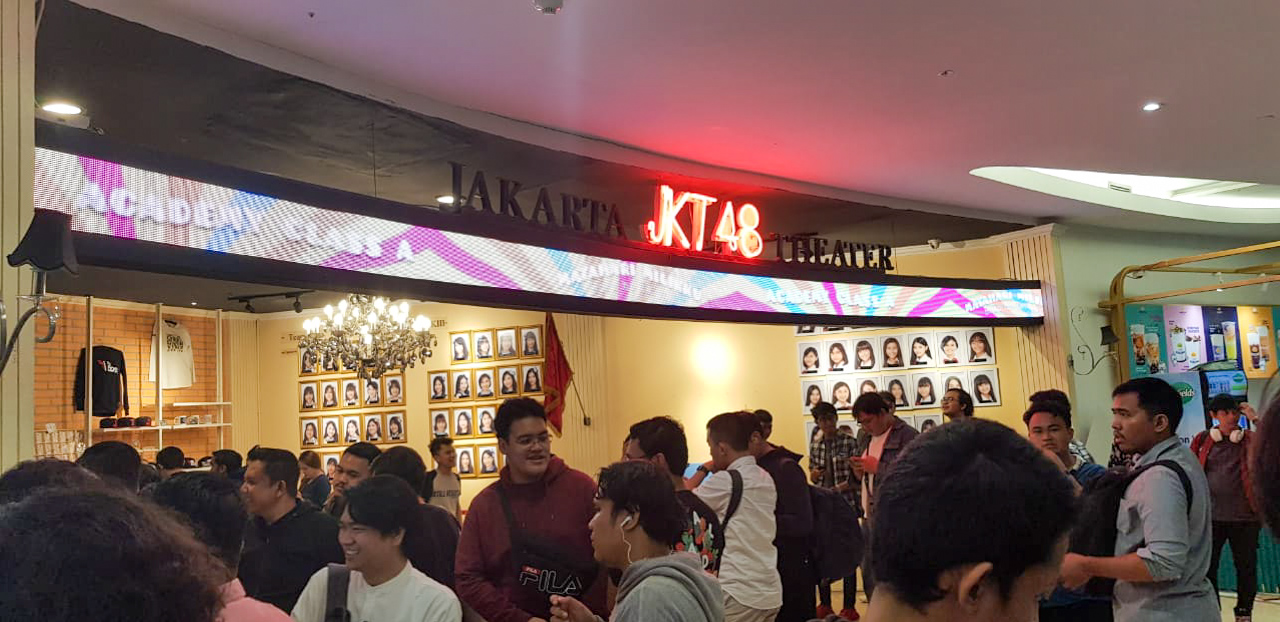
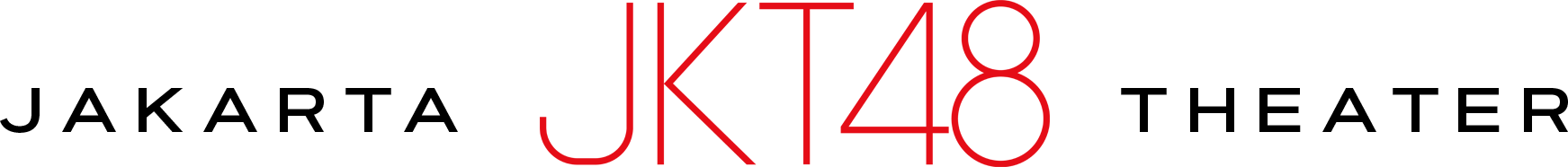
JKT48 Theater at fX Sudirman in 2012 (top) and 2020 (middle), with its logo since 2024 (bottom).

A core feature of AKB48 is daily performances at its theater in Akihabara. Aiming to replicate this model, the JKT48 management team began scouting Jakarta locations for the group's theater in early 2012. An unoccupied site in the fX Sudirman shopping mall was selected as the theater's location, and plans for its renovation began in April. The first theater performances were held on a temporary stage in the Nyi Ageng Serang Building in Kuningan, Jakarta, from 17 to 20 May 2012. The theater opened on 8 September 2012 for daily performances, with a set list of 16 songs translated into Indonesian. The theater had an original seating capacity of 180 and standing room for 30, and its design is a replica of the AKB48 Theater. It presently holds around 350 people, seated and standing.

JKT48 has performed in Japan with other AKB48 sister groups. For its first performance in that country, the group was a surprise guest at the 2011 AKB48 Kōhaku Taikō Uta Gassen and performed the Indonesian version of "Aitakatta". It performed with AKB48 and other sister groups at the 62nd NHK Kōhaku Uta Gassen, with a total of 210 members onstage. The group also participated in the 2012 AKB48 concerts at Saitama Super Arena and Tokyo Dome.

On 13 August 2012, management began accepting applications for second-generation members. Of 4,500 applicants, approximately 200 were selected for interviews the following month. The pool was narrowed from 67 to 31 in a selection round held by RCTI. All 31 finalists were eventually chosen as second-generation members at a final audition on 3 November in Japan. AKB48 members Aki Takajō and Haruka Nakagawa, whose transfers to JKT48 were announced at the Tokyo Dome concert, began their activities with the group on 1 November and made their theater debut on 26 December. Nakagawa became interested in Jakarta during a visit with other members of AKB48 in February 2012.

=== 2013–2017 ===
JKT48 was scheduled to release its debut album in January 2013, but production was hampered because of flooding in Jakarta. For the release, the group's management team distributed 100,000 free CD singles. Each single had an Indonesian version of one of four songs: "Heavy Rotation"; "Kimi no Koto ga Suki Dakara"; "Baby! Baby! Baby!" or "Ponytail to Shushu". Members, some of whom were affected by the flooding, held a fundraiser for the city's relief efforts. The debut album, Heavy Rotation, had a limited release at the JKT48 Theater on 16 February 2013 and went on sale in music stores nationwide on 2 March. All four CD singles were included on the album. That year, JKT48 released four singles: "River" (11 May), "Apakah Apakah Kau Melihat Mentari Senja?" (3 July), "Fortune Cookie yang Mencinta" (21 August), and "Musim Panas Sounds Good!" (26 November). The third single was released concurrently with AKB48.

JKT48 announced the names of 63 finalists as third-generation JKT48 trainees on 28 January 2014. The group announced and performed its fifth single, "Flying Get", on 15 February. Rina Chikano was transferred from AKB48 to JKT48 nine days later, with Aki Takajo and Rena Nozawa's positions cancelled.

On 26 April 2014, JKT48 finished its first annual senbatsu election. The 16 ranked members were scheduled to appear on the group's sixth single, "Gingham Check", which was released on 11 June. JKT48 released "Papan Penanda Isi Hati" on 27 August, with Shania Junianatha taking the center position and Rina Chikano and Thalia Ivanka Elizabeth appearing in the senbatsu for the first time. The single was released concurrently with AKB48's version for the second consecutive year. The group's eighth single, "Angin Sedang Berhembus", was released on 24 December.

On 20 February 2015, JKT48 held a concert with AKB48 in Jakarta. Fifteen members of AKB48 were sent to Jakarta for the concert, including Yui Yokoyama, Rie Kitahara and Asuka Kuramochi. JKT48 released its ninth single, "Pareo wa Emerald", on 27 March.

On 2 May, the group held its second senbatsu election; Jessica Veranda displaced Melody Laksani to win the election. The 16 ranking members appeared on its 10th single, "Kibōteki Refrain". JKT48 released its 11th single ("Halloween Night") on 26 August, the third consecutive year of a concurrent single release with AKB48. JKT48 general manager Jiro Inao died by suicide at his home in South Tangerang, Banten, on 21 March 2017.

=== 2018–2019 ===
On 8 April 2018, Melody Nurramdhani Laksani (general manager of the JKT48 operational team and former first-generation group member) announced a new tagline ("JKT48 RE:BOOST") at the JKT48 Theater. JKT48's motto was changed from "Idol You Can Meet" to "Idol Who Will Come to Meet You".

=== 2020–2021: First original song, crisis, and restructuring ===
The group released its 21st single and first original song, "Rapsodi", with "Bitter & Sweet" on 9 January 2020. "Rapsodi" was centered by Shani Indira Natio, and "Bitter & Sweet" was centered by Maria Genoveva Natalia Desy Purnamasari Gunawan. The single is JKT48's most popular and streamed song in its history.

On 14 February 2020, JKT48 held a solo concert (JKT48 Team KIII Solo Concert "KIII vs KIII") in GOR Bulungan. Although a solo concert, some former Team KIII members were invited to participate. The objective was to challenge the new Team KIII members before Ratu Vienny Fitrilya's graduation by selling 1,000 tickets in less than a month. If they failed the challenge, then the Team KIII fifth stage would be cancelled. For the concert, members were divided into blue and yellow teams.

On 28 September 2020, during the Indonesian pandemic, one member tested positive for COVID-19. Over the next month, two more members also tested positive.

In November, JKT48 announced that it would graduate its members and staff due to the pandemic. The group had announced its 11-person 10th-generation members, but cancelled their debut. The group announced on 11 January 2021, that 26 of its members were leaving, reducing its membership to 33; they left the group in mid-March. All three teams were dissolved, and the academy ceased operations.

The group released its 22nd single, "Cara Ceroboh Untuk Mencinta" or "Darashinai Aishikata" (from AKB48's 49th single, "#Sukinanda"), on 16 March. All 33 remaining members appeared on the single, JKT48's only 2021 release. The group re-introduced 8 of the 11 tenth-generation members on 18 December, and announced a new single produced by Matt Rad and August Rigo.

== Members ==
As of 30 August 2026, JKT48 has 59 members: 41 regular members, eight 13th-generation trainees, and ten 14th-generation trainees.

== Discography ==
=== Singles ===
#	Title	Album information	Notes
1	"RIVER"	Released: 11 May 2013; Label: HITS Records; Format: CD, DVD, streaming	Regular version (CD+DVD); Theater version (CD only)
2	"Yuuhi wo Miteiruka?" -Apakah Kau Melihat Mentari Senja?-	Released: 3 July 2013; Label: HITS Records; Format: CD, DVD, streaming; First JKT48 single of to have less than 16 members (10)	Regular version (CD+DVD); Theater version (CD only)
3	"Fortune Cookie yang Mencinta" -Fortune Cookie in Love-	Released: 21 August 2013; Label: HITS Records; Format: CD, DVD, streaming	Regular version (CD+DVD); Theater version (CD only)
4	"Manatsu no Sounds Good!" -Musim Panas Sounds Good!-	Released: 26 November 2013; Label: HITS Records; Format: CD, DVD, streaming	Regular version (CD+DVD); Theater version (CD only)
5	"Flying Get"	Released: 5 March 2014; Label: HITS Records; Format: CD, streaming	Alfa Group version (CD only); Theater version (CD only)
6	"Gingham Check"	Released: 11 June 2014; Label: HITS Records; Format: CD, DVD, streaming	Regular version (CD+DVD); Theater version (CD only)
7	"Papan Penanda Isi Hati" -Message on a Placard-	Release date: 27 August 2014; Label: HITS Records; Format: CD, DVD, streaming	Regular version (CD+DVD); Theater version (CD only)
8	"Angin Sedang Berhembus" -The Wind is Blowing/Kaze wa Fuiteiru-	Release date: 24 December 2014; Label: HITS Records; Format: CD, DVD, streaming	Regular version (CD+DVD); Theater version (CD only)
9	"Pareo adalah Emerald" -Pareo wa Emerald-	Released: 27 March 2015; Label: HITS Records; Format: CD, DVD, streaming	Regular version (CD+DVD); Theater version (CD only)
10	"Refrain Penuh Harapan" -Kibouteki Refrain-	Released: 27 May 2015; Label: HITS Records; Format: CD, DVD, digital download, streaming	Regular version (CD+DVD); Music card (download)
11	"Halloween Night"	Released: 26 August 2015; Label: HITS Records; Format: CD, DVD, digital download, streaming	Regular version (CD+DVD); Music card (download)
12	"Beginner"	Released: 1 January 2016; Label: HITS Records; Format: CD, DVD, digital download, streaming	Regular version (CD+DVD); Music card (download)
13	"Hanya Lihat ke Depan" -Mae Shika Mukanee-	Released: 1 June 2016; Label: HITS Records; Format: CD, DVD, digital download, streaming	Regular version (CD+DVD); Music card (download)
14	"Love Trip"	Released: 21 September 2016; Label: HITS Records; Format: CD, DVD, digital download, streaming	Regular version (CD+DVD); Music card (download)
15	"Luar Biasa" -Saikou Kayo-	Released: 21 December 2016; Label: HITS Records; Format: CD, DVD, digital download, streaming	Regular version (CD+DVD); Music card (download)
16	"So Long!"	Released: 8 March 2017; Label: HITS Records; Format: CD, DVD, digital download, streaming	Regular version (CD+DVD); Music card (download)
17	"Indahnya Senyum Manismu dst." -Kimi no Hohoemi wo Yume ni Miru-	Released: 7 June 2017; Label: HITS Records; Format: CD, DVD, digital download, streaming	Regular version (CD+DVD); Music card (download)
18	"Dirimu Melody" -Kimi wa Melody-	Released: 16 December 2017; Label: HITS Records; Format: CD, DVD, digital download, streaming; First single to contain less than 4 songs, thus did not considered as an EP.	Regular version (CD+DVD); Music card (download)
19	"Everyday, Kachuusha" / "UZA" -Everyday, Katyusha- / UZA	Released: 7 July 2018; Label: HITS Records; Format: CD, DVD, digital download, streaming; First double single of JKT48	Regular version (CD+DVD); Music card (download)
20	"High Tension"	Released: 11 January 2019 (music card), 25 January 2019 (Joox, Spotify), 30 March 2019 (CD+DVD); Label: HITS Records; Format: CD, DVD, digital download, streaming	Regular version (CD+DVD); Music card (download)
21	"Rapsodi"	Released: 22 January 2020; Label: HITS Records; Format: CD, DVD, digital download, streaming; First original single of JKT48	Regular version (CD+DVD); Music card (download)
22	"Cara Ceroboh untuk Mencinta" -Darashinai Aishikata-	Released: 16 March 2021; Format: Digital streaming, CD (limited), audio cassette (limited), USB flash disk (limited)	Streaming service; Deluxe edition (CD, audio cassette and USB flash disk)
23	"Flying High"	Released: 17 June 2022; Format: Digital streaming, CD (limited), USB flash disk (limited); Second original single of JKT48	Streaming service; Deluxe edition (CD and USB flash disk)
24	"Sayonara Crawl"	Released: 11 October 2023; Format: Digital streaming, CD (limited)	Streaming service; Special set (CD)
25	"Magic Hour"	Released: 8 May 2024 (short movies), 9 May 2024 (music video), 10 May 2024 (digital music platforms); Format: Digital streaming; Third original single of JKT48	Streaming service
26	"#KuSangatSuka" -#Sukinanda-	Released: 2 February 2025 (music video), 3 February 2025 (digital music platforms); Format: Digital streaming	Streaming service
27	"Andai 'Ku Bukan Idola" -Idol Nanka Janakattara-	Released: 4 February 2026 (music video, digital music platforms); Format: Digital streaming	Streaming service

=== Studio albums ===
Title	Album information	Notes	Refs
Heavy Rotation	Released: 16 February 2013; Label: HITS Records; Format: CD, DVD	Type-A (CD+DVD); Type-B (CD only)	
Mahagita -Kamikyokutachi-	Released: 23 March 2016; Label: HITS Records; Format: CD, digital download	Regular version (CD only); Music card (download)	
B•E•L•I•E•V•E	Released: 13 September 2017; Label: HITS Records; Format: CD, digital download	Regular version (CD only); Music card (download)	
Joy Kick! Tears	Released: 9 October 2019; Label: HITS Records; Format: CD, digital download	Regular version (CD only); Music Card (download)	
Mahagita Vol. 2 -Kamikyokutachi Vol. 2-	Released: 27 October 2023; Format: Digital streaming	Streaming service	

== Filmography ==
=== Films ===
Year	Title	Group/Individual	Notes
2014	Viva JKT48	Group	8 members as leading casts, 8 members as supporting casts, the rest of Team J and KIII members as bit casts.
2015	Wewe	Individual	Nabilah Ratna Ayu Azalia as supporting actress
2015	JKT48 Journal: Members Life Stories About	Group	Documentary film, direct-to-DVD.
2015	Sunshine Becomes You	Individual	Nabilah Ratna Ayu Azalia as leading actress
2018	Dilan 1990	Individual	Adhisty Zara as bit actress
2018	Partikelir	Individual	Shinta Naomi makes cameo appearance
2018	Dirimu Melody: The Story	Group	Documentary film, direct-to-DVD.
2018	Keluarga Cemara	Individual	Adhisty Zara as leading actress 3 members (Eve Antoinette Ichwan, Melati Putri Rahel Sesilia, Thalia Ivanka Elizabeth) as bit actresses 1 member (Citra Ayu Pranajaya Wibrado) as bit actress leaves the group before the film's release
2019	Dilan 1991	Individual	Adhisty Zara as supporting actress Shania Gracia makes uncredited cameo appearance
2019	Dua Garis Biru	Individual	Adhisty Zara as leading actress 2 members (Ariella Calista Ichwan, Cindy Hapsari M. P. P.) as bit actresses
2019	Ratu Ilmu Hitam	Individual	Adhisty Zara as main actress
2019	Koboy Kampus	Individual	Ratu Vienny Fitrilya as supporting actress
2019	Senior	Individual	Ariella Calista Ichwan as supporting actress
2021	The Heartbreak Club	Individual	Fransisca Saraswati Puspa Dewi as supporting actress
2022	Tainted Soul	Individual	Azizi Asadel as leading actress Gabriela Margareth Warouw as supporting actress graduates from the group before the film's release
2024	Ancika: Dia yang Bersamaku 1995	Individual	Azizi Asadel as leading actress Shania Gracia as supporting actress
2024	Melodate	Individual	Greesella Adhalia as supporting actress The filming process was carried out in 2022, until the film was released 2 years later
2024	Dominion of Darkness	Individual	Freya Jayawardana as supporting actress
2024	Bolehkah Sekali Saja Kumenangis	Individual	Shania Gracia as supporting actress
2024	Aku Jati, Aku Asperger	Individual	Kathrina Irene Indarto Putri as supporting actress The filming process was carried out in 2022, until the film was released 2 years later
2024	Hidup Ini Terlalu Banyak Kamu	Individual	Shania Gracia as supporting actress
2024	A Brother and 7 Siblings	Individual	Freya Jayawardana as leading actress

=== Television shows ===
Year	Title	Channel	Notes
2012	JKT48 School	Global TV	Weekly variety show
2013	JKT48 Missions	Trans7	Weekly variety show
2013	JKT48 Story	RCTI	Weekly variety show
2014–2015	iClub48	NET	Weekly variety show
2014–2015	Yokoso JKT48	Antv (2014–2015); RTV (2015)	Weekly variety show
2015–2016	The Ichiban	RTV	Weekly variety show

== Promotion and media ==
JKT48 follows AKB48, its Japanese sister group, in boosting record sales with a number of marketing strategies. The main track for each single is sung by a "All Stars" (選抜, senbatsu; selection) of popular members of JKT48's teams, with one girl selected as the center performer. Singles and albums are released with alternate types and voting codes for annual elections. Alan Swarts of MTV Japan has noted that collectors purchasing multiple copies of AKB48 CDs have inflated sales, and is a reason why Japan's music industry has been booming. Six elections have been held, most recently in 2019.

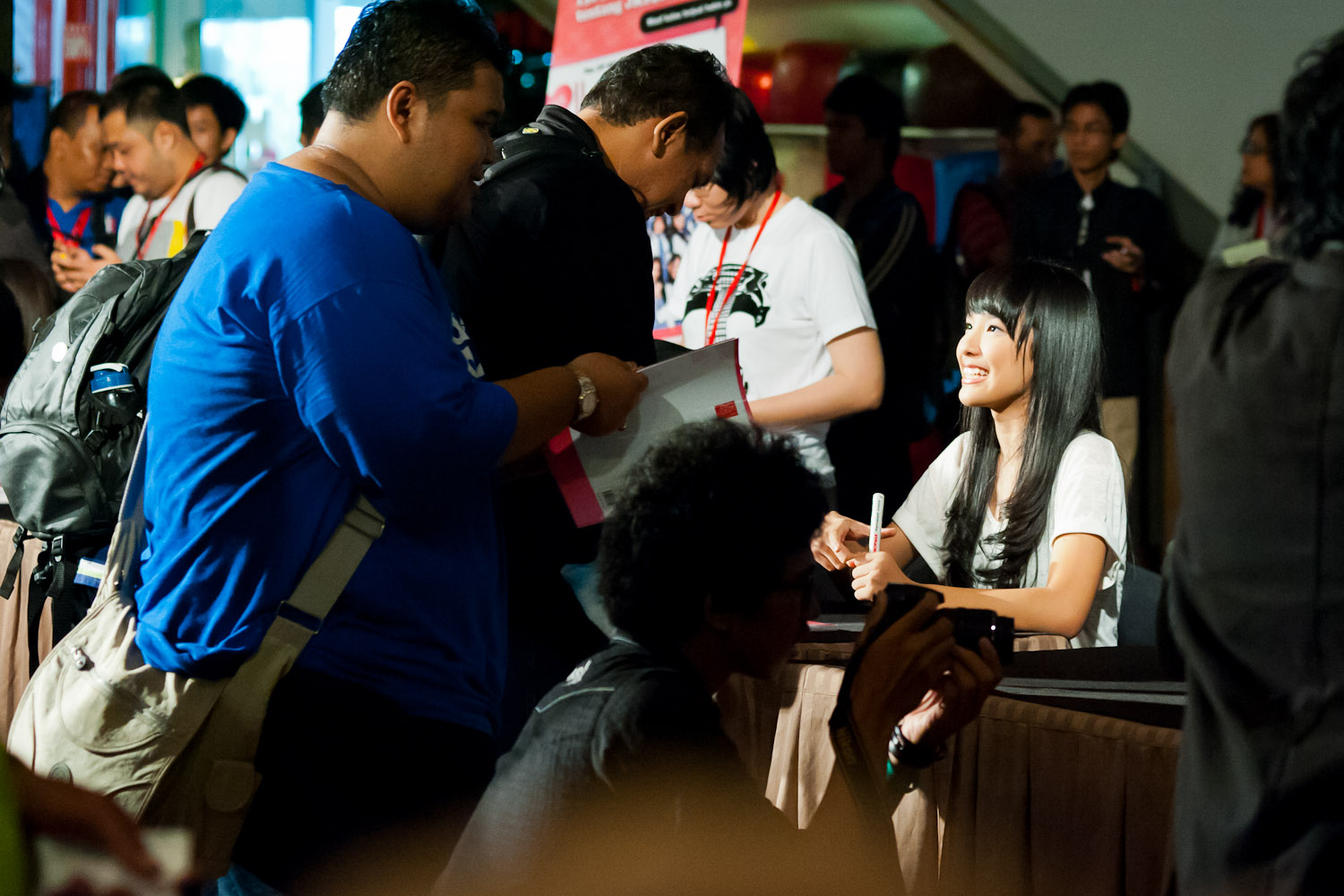
Beby of JKT48 greets fans at a 2012 book signing.

JKT48 is billed as a "unique idol group with Indonesian culture". Harris Thayeb, director of the group's agent Dentsu Media Group Indonesia, believed that the group "will make our idols more down to earth, being always nice and able to be greeted anytime". They were seen as part of "Cool Japan", adopted by the Japanese government to promote the country's culture around the world.

On 25 February 2012, JKT48 held a concert with AKB48 at the Japan Pop Culture Festival at Balai Kartini in Jakarta. The event was sponsored by the Embassy of Japan, the Japanese Agency for Cultural Affairs, and the Indonesian Ministry of Tourism and Creative Economy. According to Junji Shimada, deputy to the Japanese ambassador, AKB48 was invited to perform because of its status as a Japanese pop icon, and the groups represent friendship between Japan and Indonesia.

JKT48 appeared on television almost daily after its debut and in television advertisements by Japanese companies seeking a share of the rapidly-growing Indonesian market. Otsuka Pharmaceutical hired JKT48 to promote the company's Pocari Sweat beverages one month after the group's first members were announced. Sharp Corporation selected JKT48 to appear at the company's promotional events, and Yamaha Motor Company hired the group to promote its line of fuel-efficient Mio J scooters to Indonesian teens. Ezaki Glico featured the group in its advertisements as part of an effort to increase sales in Indonesia to over Rp1 billion.

Teenagers and young, single men are the largest portion of the JKT48 and AKB48 fan base, but some believe that JKT48's idol concept does not suit Indonesian culture.

== See also ==
- List of JKT48 performances

== Bibliography ==
- Galbraith, Patrick W. (2012). "Idols: Desire in Japanese Consumer Capitalism". In Galbraith, Patrick W.; Karlin, Jason G. (eds.). Idols and Celebrity in Japanese Media Culture. Houndmills, Basingstoke, Hampshire: Palgrave Macmillan. ISBN 978-0-230-29830-9.
- Ogino, Toshiyuki; Ohira, Akira (2012). Uchino, Emi; Kuriyama, Haruka; Iwasaki, Haruka (eds.). Love JKT48: The 1st Official Guide Book. Jakarta: Dunia Otomotifindo Mediatama. ISBN 978-979-23-5755-4.
