= Sunshine Becomes You =

2015 film

- Film poster
- Directed by: Rocky Soraya
- Written by: Ilana Tan
- Based on: Sunshine Becomes You by Ilana Tan
- Produced by: Rocky Soraya; Ram Soraya
- Starring: Nabilah Ratna Ayu Azalia; Herjunot Ali; Boy William
- Music by: Profound Music
- Production companies: Hitmaker Studios; E-Motion Entertainment
- Distributed by: Soraya Intercine Films
- Release date: 23 December 2015
- Running time: 120 minutes
- Country: Indonesia
- Languages: Indonesian; English

Sunshine Becomes You is a 2015 Indonesian romance film directed by Rocky Soraya and based on Sunshine Becomes You (book) by Ilana Tan. The film was about love story of a pianist named Alex Hirano and a ballerina named Mia Clark. Shooting location was on New York City, United States.

== Cast ==
- Herjunot Ali as Alex Hirano, a pianist
- Boy William as Ray Hirano, Alex Hirano's brother
- Nabilah JKT48 as Mia Clark, a ballet dancer
- Annabella Jusuf as Lucy
- Sam Brodie as Carl (Alex Hirano's assistant)
