= JKT48 School =

Indonesian TV series

- Created by: Yasushi Akimoto
- Based on: Shukan AKB from TV Tokyo
- Developed by: JKT48 Operation Team; Global TV (MNC Group)
- Starring: JKT48
- Country of origin: Indonesia
- No. of episodes: 8

Production
- Executive producer: Victor Setiawan
- Producer: Anissa Tisnadisastra
- Running time: 30 minutes
- Production companies: Dentsu; AKS; Global TV

Original release
- Release: April 15 – June 3, 2012

JKT48 School is a variety show was aired on Global TV which aims to recognize the members of JKT48 more closely. Hosted by John Martin Tumbel which serves as class guardian, JKT48 School aired on April 15 until June 3, 2012. This show was adopted from TV Tokyo's Shukan AKB.

Each guest star attending JKT48 School will act as a teacher in different fields of study for each episode.

== Casts ==
Every episode, the cast (members) can change at any time.

- Class guardian (host) :

John Martin Tumbel

- Students (JKT48 all members) :

Alissa Galliamova, Ayana Shahab, Beby Chaesara Anadila, Cindy Gulla, Cleopatra Djapri, Delima Rizky, Devi Kinal Putri, Diasta Priswarini, Frieska Anastasia Laksani, Gabriela Margareth Warouw, Ghaida Farisya, Jessica Vania, Jessica Veranda, Melody Nurramdhani Laksani, Nabilah Ratna Ayu Azalia, Neneng Rosediana, Rena Nozawa, Rezky Wiranti Dhike, Rica Leyona, Sendy Ariani, Shania Junianatha, Sonia Natalia, Sonya Pandarmawan, Stella Cornelia

== Episode list ==
Eps	Aired on	Subjects	Guest teacher	Notes
1	15 April 2012	Science	Indy Barends	
2	22 April 2012	Sports	Mario Lawalata	
3	29 April 2012	Indonesian language	Magdalena	
4	6 May 2012	Cooking	Chef Rinrin Marinka	
5	13 May 2012	Music	Budi Doremi	
6	20 May 2012	Social Sciences	Tike Priatnakusumah	
7	27 May 2012	Magic	Demian Aditya	
8	3 June 2012	Art	Edric Tjandra	

== JKT48 News ==
The JKT48 News segment is present at the end of each episode of the program. Contains information related to JKT48, starting from routine activities, member practices, till concerts. This segment hosted by Melody Nurramdhani Laksani (for 2nd episode of JKT48 School, hosted by Shania Junianatha).
