= Heavy Rotation (JKT48 album) =

Studio album by JKT48
- Released: 16 February 2013
- Genre: Pop
- Label: Hits (distributed by Sony Music Indonesia)
- Producer: Yasushi Akimoto

Cover of TYPE B

Heavy Rotation is the first released album of the Indonesian idol group, JKT48, on 16 February 2013 under the label Hits Records, distributed by PT Sony Music Indonesia Tbk. The songs are recycled from the singles of AKB48 & SKE48 translated into Indonesian.

== Release ==
Heavy Rotation was released on 16 February 2013 in two versions: Type-A and Type-B. Type-A has the CD and the DVD., while Type-B has only the CD. The Type-A album extras include an original photo, handshake ticket, and special card for CD promotion. The Type-B album has a special card from special CD promo, and a "janken card".

== Track listing ==
CD
| No. | Title | Length |
|---|---|---|
| 1. | "Heavy Rotation" |
| 2. | "Kimi no Koto ga Suki Dakara -Karena Kusuka Dirimu-" |
| 3. | "Ponytail to Chou-chou -Ponytail dan Shu-shu-" |
| 4. | "Baby! Baby! Baby!" |
| 5. | "Shonichi -Hari Pertama-" |
| 6. | "Wasshoi J!" |
| 7. | "Oogoe Diamond -Teriakan Berlian-" |
| 8. | "Gomenne, Summer -Maafkan, Summer-" |
| 9. | "Namida Surprise! -Air Mata Surprise!-" |
| 10. | "Hikoukigumo -Jejak Awan Pesawat-" |

Type-A DVD
| No. | Title | Length |
|---|---|---|
| 1. | "Heavy Rotation Music Video" |
| 2. | "Memories – Looking Back on the 1st Year" |

== Trivia ==
Heavy Rotation is the 1st cover album released by JKT48 and cover song Heavy Rotation from AKB48's 19th Major Single. This Single features the Senbatsu elected by the fans in the 2nd Senbatsu Election, with Oshima Yuko as center of the single. This single is by far, one of the most-promoted singles AKB48 released with all the song having some kind of tie-in, with 3 of them being of huge campaigns that were used all over Japan and other country like Indonesia and Shanghai China.
