= JKT48 Missions =

- Starring: JKT48
- Opening theme: "Mirai no Kajitsu"; JKT48 Team KIII
- Country of origin: Indonesia
- No. of episodes: 14 episodes

Production
- Executive producer: Mardhatillah
- Producer: Hellen Tanuhanjaya
- Running time: 45 minutes
- Production company: Trans Corp

Original release
- Network: Trans7
- Release: June 23 – September 22, 2013 (Hiatus)

JKT48 Missions is an Indonesian variety show which aired on Trans7 which aims to provide a mission or a challenge to Member JKT48. JKT48 Missions begin airing on Sunday, June 23, 2013 at 10.45 pm, but now is on hiatus.

== Format ==
Missions and challenges that can be a challenge given to all members who perform, or be divided into several teams to compete to be the winner, but in some episodes JKT48 Missions, also often provide a challenge for big events such as Concerts in JKT48 "Perkenalkan, Nama Kami JKT48" or when "Revival Show Pajama Drive JKT48". JKT48 Missions also never given a mission to members only, such as the episode titled "Harvest Time in Okayama", Melody runs its own mission.
