= RTV (Indonesian TV network) =

Indonesian television broadcaster

- Type: Television broadcaster
- Country: Indonesia
- Broadcast area: Nationwide
- Headquarters: Thamrin City, Jl. Thamrin Boulevard, Kebon Melati, Tanah Abang, Central Jakarta 10230

Programming
- Language: Indonesian
- Picture format: 1080i HDTV (downscaled to 16:9 576i for the SDTV feed)

Ownership
- Owner: Rajawali Corpora
- Key people: Artine S. Utomo (CEO)

History
- Launched: 20 October 2008 (trial broadcast); 1 November 2009 (as B Channel); 3 May 2014; 12 years ago (as RTV)
- Founder: Sofia Koswara
- Former names: B Channel (2009–2014)

Links
- Website: www.rtv.co.id

Availability

Terrestrial
- Digital Greater Jakarta: 26 (UHF); Channel 25; Channel 32
- Digital Regional branches: Check local frequencies (on Indonesian language)

Streaming media
- IndiHome TV: Watch live (IndiHome customers only)
- Vidio: Watch live
- Vision+: Watch live

PT Metropolitan Televisindo, operating as Rajawali Televisi (RTV, stylized as rtv) is an Indonesian television broadcaster in Indonesia owned by Rajawali Corpora and licensed by Ministry of Communication and Information Technology. Its frequency is coordinated through the Department of Transportation. Originally launched as B Channel on 1 November 2009 in Jakarta, it later changed its name to RTV to launch Langit Rajawali on 3 May 2014. Broadcasting 24 hours a day, RTV's programs focus on entertainment, soft news, and a variety of animation programs, ranging from anime, tokusatsu, and children's animation.

On 30 March 2017, during a press conference, RTV announced that they would focus more on children's programmes. In February 2018, RTV opened a smaller studio at KidZania Jakarta.
