= List of AKB0048 episodes =

2012 anime television episodes

AKB0048 is a 2012 anime television series produced by Satelight based on the entertainment group, AKB48. Set in the distant future, where many planets have been put under entertainment bans, AKB0048, a group of successors to the original AKB48, travel across the galaxy to provide hope to these planets whilst fighting off the anti-entertainment force, DES. The series follows a group of understudies who train to become the next group of successors. The first season aired in Japan between April 29, 2012, and July 22, 2012. The opening theme is "Speaking About a Hope" (希望について, Kibō ni Tsuite) by No Name (Mayu Watanabe, Sumire Satō, Amina Satō, Sayaka Nakaya, Sawako Hata, Mao Mita, Karen Iwata, Kumi Yagami, & Haruka Ishida) while the ending theme is "Dreams Are Forever Reborn" (夢は何度も生まれ変わる, Yume wa Nando mo Umarekawaru)" by No Name. The second season aired between January 5, 2013, and March 30, 2013. The opening theme is "The Voice with No Master" (主なきその声, Aruji naki sono Koe) by No Name whilst the ending theme is "I Offer These Tears to You" (この涙を君に捧ぐ, Kono Namida o Kimi ni Sasagu) The series is licensed in North America by Sentai Filmworks.

== Episode list ==
=== AKB0048 (2012) ===
No. overall	No. in season	Title	Original release date
1	1	"The Indelible Dream"; Transliteration: "Kesenai Yume" (Japanese: 消せない夢)	April 29, 2012
In a dystopian future where music is deemed illegal, AKB0048, successors to the idol group AKB48, rebel against the government to bring music to people's hearts. In the year 0048, three thirteen-year-old girls, Nagisa Motomiya, Orine Aida and Yūka Ichijō, decide to audition to become members of AKB, although Nagisa has trouble singing due to the restrictions placed upon her by her father. As the girls hear they have passed the first round of auditions, Nagisa becomes downhearted as she would not be allowed to go. However, after hearing about Yūka's and Orine's reasons for wanting to join AKB, Nagisa decides to join Yūka and Orine and head off to the auditions.
2	2	"The Chosen Lights"; Transliteration: "Erabareshi Hikari" (Japanese: 選ばれし光)	May 6, 2012
As Nagisa, Orine and Yūka travel on the ship headed for the auditions, they meet fellow auditioners Suzuko Kanzaki and Makoto Yokomizo, along with a stowaway named Sonata Shinonome. They soon learn that Chieri Sono, the daughter of a corporate CEO who had introduced them to AKB in their childhood, had apparently run away from home and boarded the ship to the auditions. While searching for her, Nagisa encounters a strange kid who tells her she should turn Chieri in if she wants to survive the auditions. Just then, the ship comes under attack from the anti-entertainment force DES who come to capture the auditioners. Just as the girls are about to be captured, AKB0048 arrive to take on the forces. As Nagisa gets caught while retrieving a ribbon her mother gave her, the kid from before rescues her, revealing herself to be none other than Chieri. Chieri gets trapped under a chandelier, but Nagisa refuses to leave her behind. This causes a creature known as a Kirara to glow brightly, which AKB0048 member Yūko Ōshima points out is the symbol of an idol before helping to free Chieri and bringing both her and Nagisa to the escape shuttle, where they blast off into a warp gate.
3	3	"Stardust Selection"; Transliteration: "Hoshikuzu Serekushon" (Japanese: 星屑セレクション)	May 13, 2012
As all the applicants are gathered, they begin intense idol training which, to their surprise, involves combat skills and self defense. The manager, Tsubasa Katagiri, reveals that, in order to be selected, the applicants must protect AKB during a guerrilla concert. As Nagisa and Yūka argue about Chieri's change in attitude, they stumble across AKB0048 practicing and learn how hard they practice and how their occasional squabbles help improve each other. The day of the concert come and the applicants find themselves up against the DES, with many of the girls failing under pressure. As Nagisa and Chieri fight together, Chieri gets shot while protecting Nagisa. Thankfully, it is revealed the DES attack was simply a simulation using paint balls. Having taken note of their friendship and teamwork, Tsubasa announces that Nagisa, Chieri, Yūka, Orine, Suzuko, Makoto and Sonata have all successfully passed and will become the 77th generation understudies.
4	4	"Your Efforts Aren't in Vain"; Transliteration: "Sono Doryoku Uragiranai" (Japanese: その努力裏切らない)	May 20, 2012
As the 77th gen trainees arrive on Akibastar, they are brought to see an AKB concert, which is opened by the two remaining 75th gen trainees, Mimori Kishida and Sonata's older sister Kanata. However, Kanata is not too pleased that Sonata had joined up and ends up arguing with her. Speaking with Mimori, Kanata reveals she joined AKB so she could get revenge on the DES for killing her father and did not want Sonata to face such danger. As dance lessons begin the next day, Kanata becomes frustrated when the instructor, Ushiyama, criticizes her lack of motivation and runs off. However, Mimori reminds her that it is okay to enjoy singing and she soon makes up with Sonata.
5	5	"Their Day Off"; Transliteration: "Sorezore no Kyūjitsu" (Japanese: それぞれの休日)	May 27, 2012
As the trainees are given a day off from their lessons, the girls split off into various groups doing various activities with their seniors. Nagisa decides to follow Chieri as she goes shopping, where they meet up with Yūko, who tells them about the last successor of Atsuko Maeda who disappeared during a concert. Meanwhile, Suzuko and Sonata becomes curious about AKB0048's producer, Sensei-Sensei, while Yūka and Orine meet with Tomomi Itano and her ancestors. As all of the current members teach the trainees about what gives them inspiration, Nagisa and Chieri decide to follow in Yūko's footsteps.
6	6	"The First Handshake Event"; Transliteration: "Hajimete no Akushukai" (Japanese: 初めての握手会)	June 3, 2012
The trainees are to make their public debut at a handshake event in order to make a strong impression on their fans. As the girls have trouble deciding what to wear for the event, Orine, who wants to succeed Sashiko receives a hateful video mail, threatening to bomb the event if Orine doesn't quit, which leaves her shaken up. After some advice from Minami Takahashi that there will always be haters, Orine decides to attend the event. Despite still being a little shaken, she cheers up when she meets her first fan. Just then, as the kid from the video threat shows up, an explosion goes off, though it turns out to not be because of him, but instead a DES attack. As the others fight off the DES, Orine vows to protect her hater so she can learn how to improve herself, before they are backed up by the OTA, fans who fight alongside AKB in times of need. Afterwards, Orine receives another letter from her hater offering compliment and constructive criticism.
7	7	"Kirara of Succession"; Transliteration: "Shūmei Kirara" (Japanese: 襲名キララ)	June 10, 2012
With some of the AKB successors attending a peace ceremony, Kanata, Mimori, Chieri and 76th gen understudy Megumi are chosen to be stand-ins for the next concert. As Chieri's standing in for Yūko invokes jealousy from the 76th gen understudies, they dig up dirt on how her father is a manufacturer of DES weapons. Chieri explains to Nagisa about how she ran away from home when she heard her father's machines were being used by DES. As Kanata chases after Chieri, reminding her that her father should not affect her dream, Minami, Yūko and some other successors who believe Kanata should be made into a successor follow Tsubasa to where she meets Sensei-Sensei. There, they discover a cave full of Kirara, which shows a mirror of who succeeds the original AKB48 member, predicting Kanata will succeed Minami, who does not take it well.
8	8	"To Whom Does That Name Belong?"; Transliteration: "Sono Namae, Dare no Mono?" (Japanese: その名前、誰のもの？)	June 17, 2012
Following the stand-ins concert, Kanata, Mimori and the 77th gen understudies are asked to stand in for a guerilla concert on a planet where the entertainment ban is in full effect, prompting some jealousy from the 76th gen understudies. Meanwhile, Minami is still concerned about what she saw the other day, and acts weird around Kanata. As they make over there, Sae Miyazawa, a former 76th gen understudy, grows concerned about Megumi. As the increased security evokes debate about whether the concert should be cancelled, the ship comes under attack by the DES. Noticing Minami is struggling to stay focused, Yūko and Kanata set off to rescue her as she is overwhelmed by the enemy. As she recovers from her injuries, Minami laments that she does not want to graduate, but she does not want to hold Kanata back either. As Yūko tells Minami that she should focus on her dream above others, Kanata resolves to become stronger.
9	9	"Emotion Relation"; Transliteration: "Kimochi Rirēshon" (Japanese: キモチリレーション)	June 24, 2012
Due to Minami's injuries, Kanata is asked to fill in for her in an upcoming concert on the snowy planet Thundristar, much to Minami's dismay. As the understudies explore the planet and see how people under the entertainment ban are like, they meet a group of young fans who are looking forward to the concert. As Nagisa sings to cheer them up, Tsubasa decides to hold a multiple co-ordinated concert with the understudies in order to distract the DES while the main concert takes place. Before the concert begins, Minami demands to participate despite her injuries, much to Kanata's disappointment. As Kanata escorts Minami after she comes down with a fever at the end of the concert, Minami understands a bit more about Kanata's passion and once again feels she deserves to be Minami more than herself.
10	10	"Miracle of the Waves"; Transliteration: "Namima no Kiseki" (Japanese: 波間のキセキ)	July 1, 2012
Following a meeting with Sensei-Sensei, Tsubasa announces a gravure shoot for all the members, including the understudies. As they arrive on the ocean planet Atamistar, Makoto grows concerned about her appearance, so Suzuko uses a technique to push all the fat up to her breasts. Meanwhile, Yūko confronts Tsubasa, who was a former AKB successor, about the reason why Atsuko disappeared and the center position was abolished, but gets no answers. As Makoto's plan ultimately fails after being stung by a jellyfish, the Kirara glows brightly when Nagisa and Chieri are shot together. As Suzuko explains to Makoto about how she'd rather be an administration member than a successor, Chieri tells Nagisa that she thinks Kirara has chosen her. Meanwhile, Tsubasa meets up with the camerawoman, Mikako Minamino, who is the former successor of Minami Minegishi and a former Center Nova, who shows Tsubasa the picture of Kirara glowing for Chieri and Nagisa. Tsubasa is satisfied for this, but Minami declares she is against the idea of the Center Nova position being resurrected.
11	11	"Return to Lancaster"; Transliteration: "Rankasutā Futatabi" (Japanese: ランカスター再び)	July 8, 2012
Following one of AKB's concerts, it's suddenly announced that the understudies will make their debut performance on Lancaster, Nagisa, Orine, and Yūka's home planet. As the setlist is announced, it is revealed Nagisa will performing a solo song generally sung by those who receive promotions. Meanwhile, Yūka grows concerned when she learns the boy she fell out with back home, Mamoru, doesn't want her to come back. It is soon announced that a new song has been composed by Sensei-Sensei for the understudies, the first since Atsuko's disappearance, irritating Yūko who becomes determined to learn this song herself. As they approach Lancaster, they learn DES have learnt of the concert. As the understudies explore the town and find the school has been abandoned, they encounter Mamoru and his comrade Aoi, who are members of the Entertainment Liberation. They explain what had happened during the past few months, including the arrest of Nagisa's father. As the base comes under attack from the DES and the understudies are forced to run, Orine is cornered by a tank which came from the factory she worked at.
12	12	"The Idol Who Sings of Love"; Transliteration: "Ai o Utau Aidoru" (Japanese: 愛をうたうアイドル)	July 15, 2012
Nagisa, Chieri and Orine manage to evade capture until they are rescued by the WOTA, who offer to help Nagisa rescue her father. Arriving at the detention center, Kanata and Yūka join the WOTA forces in diversionary tactics while the rest of the understudies sneak in underground. However, Nagisa's father refuses to be rescued and they are forced to retreat empty handed. While recouping at Yūka's family restaurant, Nagisa hears from Yūka's parents how her father was arrested because he didn't want Nagisa to be forced to quit AKB0048. Due to all the stress she has been feeling, Nagisa ends up losing her voice, so Chieri decides to fill in for her song. Meanwhile, Minami confesses to Yūko that she intends to graduate after the concert, while Chieri tells Nagisa not to think about quitting until after their performance. As the day of the concert comes, the understudies start their performance while the successors and WOTA defend against the DES, although the concert is cut short due to the overwhelming DES forces. As Yūka says goodbye to Mamoru, who confessed his love for her before the concert, a new Kirara appears.
13	13	"For Their Smiles"; Transliteration: "Egao no Tame ni" (Japanese: 笑顔のために)	July 22, 2012
As Tsubasa recalls some things Atsuko taught her, the understudies, along with the successors, request that they resume the concert. Just then, everyone hears the voice of Atsuko, whose light brings the concert to the detention center. As Chieri offers Nagisa the chance to sing, she gets her voice back upon seeing her family support her and Chieri's Kirara splits in two. The understudies' group performance soon begins, with everyone bathed in a radiant glow as they perform. As Minami fights to protect the understudies from the DES, the Kirara in the holy grounds choose her as Takamina's successor once more, while Sensei-Sensei prophesies that one of the understudies will become the next Center Nova. The camerawoman, who was the former successor of Minami Minegishi, predicted that if they glowed brighter, they would disappear. But didn't at the last minute, she falls on her feet, wondering about the Center Nova. She discovers that the substance called 'Dualium' is the reason why the Center Nova phenomena occurred. After a brief reunion with their family, friends and fans, AKB0048 set off to their next stage.

=== AKB0048: Next Stage (2013) ===
No. overall	No. in season	Title	Original release date
14	1	"The Young Girls' Trial"; Transliteration: "Shōjo Saiban" (Japanese: 少女裁判)	January 5, 2013
Following the understudies' debut, Nagisa has a dream about Atsuko, whilst Yūko ponders about Nagisa and Chieri's potential to be Center Novas. After another performance by the understudies, Tsubasa announces the return of both General Elections, in which fans nominate understudies and successors to participate on a single, and the revival of the Center Nova position, exciting Yūko, who declares she'll be the one to claim it. Whilst resting at a hot spring inn, the DES attack and capture Chieri, Sonata, and Yuki "Yukirin" Kashiwagi, whose real name is revealed to be Ayako Kuroki, taking them to the High Court on Kasumigastar where they put them on a live trial broadcast across the galaxy. As the rest of the group plan a rescue attempt, Chieri decides to plead her defense, exclaiming her faith in AKB0048. Spurred on by her words, AKB0048 arrive on the planet and rescue Chieri and the others. Meanwhile, Chieri's father is planning something using the data gathered from the trial.
15	2	"Shocking New Developments!?"; Transliteration: "Shōgeki no Shintenkai!?" (Japanese: 衝撃の新展開!?)	January 12, 2013
Following the broadcast of the trial, Chieri has seen a popularity boost and has been getting more work. Meanwhile, Tsubasa announces that there will be a new guerilla channel for AKB themed shows, with the understudies to star in a variety show. As Cheri's father is seen developing artificial Kiraras, Tsubasa becomes curious as to how were able to break into Kasumigastar so easily. Meanwhile, Nagisa, who has yet to make a poster for the general elections, notices Chieri hasn't made one either. As Tsubasa becomes disappointed by the quality of the variety shows, Chieri shares her worries with Nagisa, saying she would rather be elected for her skill than for the trial broadcast. They are approached by Yuki and Haruna "Kojiharu" Kojima, who tell them to watch Atsuko's video for the general elections, which also showed Yūko from before she was a successor, when she was known as Hikari Kimishima. As the girls learn the variety shows are being broadcast on planets with the strictest entertainment ban laws, they put more effort into entertaining the audience whilst Nagisa and Chieri complete their posters. Tsubasa soon announced the early results for the general elections, with Chieri ranked in 9th place.
16	3	"The Idol's Dark Before the Dawn"; Transliteration: "Aidoru no Yoakemae" (Japanese: アイドルの夜明け前)	January 17, 2013
As the understudies participate in a pre-election handshake event, Nagisa becomes concerned about Chieri, who has been feeling down since the early result announcement. During the event, Chieri learns of a noodle commercial using footage from her trial to promote their product. Later that night, Nagisa observes Yūko and Minami vowing to compete against each other in the elections before hearing from Mimori about her dedication to her fans. The next day, Chieri meets up with a servant from her family, Yasunaga, who gives her a video message from her father, revealing that his group was involved in her trial and has been promoting her idol career since then. As the day of the elections arrives and the final results are announced, Mimori is ranked in 10th place.
17	4	"New General Elections"; Transliteration: "Shin Senbatsu Sōsenkyo" (Japanese: 新選抜総選挙)	January 26, 2013
Mimori gives Kanata her thanks for helping her get this far, restating her promise that they will both be successors some day. Meanwhile, Chieri is awaiting the results, having said to Tsubasa that she wants to quit 00 if she is announced as she felt she didn't earn her votes, to which Tsubasa responded that if she is elected, she must tell the fans directly that she is quitting. The next set of places go to Sae, Tomochin and Kojiharu, whose speeches help Nagisa understand what the general elections are all about. Conflicted about what she should do, Chieri enters a panicked state when she is announced in sixth place. However, she overcomes her state to announce her love for her fans, saying that she'll continue doing her best. As the next set of places go to Mayuyu, Yukirin and Sayaka, Nagisa starts to have an unnerving feeling. Second place is awarded to Minami, who gives her thanks to everyone who helped her get this far. Yūko is then announced as the winner, where she states her true goal is still to surpass Atsuko and become Center Nova. After the ceremony, Nagisa overcomes her fears and vows to face Chieri head on.
18	5	"The Forbidden Star"; Transliteration: "Kinjirareta Hoshi" (Japanese: 禁じられた星)	February 2, 2013
The elected members are chosen for a concert on Baltistar, a planet completely under the entertainment ban. Meanwhile, the 77th generation of understudies are chosen to infiltrate a nearby military base undercover in order to investigate reports of important business people visiting the base. As the concert begins, drawing out the DES forces, the understudies begin their mission and start gathering intel. During their investigation, Nagisa, Yūka and Makoto discover a hidden casino where elite members gamble on how long the concert will last. As they attempt to investigate further, Makoto inadvertently blows their cover. However, due to an apparent stroke of luck, they manage to escape to a garbage disposal and report their findings to Tsubasa. The girls decide to target the nuclear reactor hidden somewhere in the base so they can shut down the casino and escape, with Orine's team using a stolen mech to help them. As Makoto laments her usefulness, Higashino, the DES guard that helped them escape, gives her his support and helps her to shut down the reactor, gaining her own Kirara in the process.
19	6	"Inheritor of the Light"; Transliteration: "Kagayaki wo Tsugumono" (Japanese: 輝きを継ぐ者)	February 9, 2013
As rumor spreads that Chieri could potentially succeed Atsuko, the Kirara of Succession show the original Atsuko's image, foretelling that someone may succeed her soon. Meanwhile, Mikako is brought in as the group's official camerawoman as they rehearse for a concert. During rehearsals, Yūko has an outburst at both Nagisa and Chieri, feeling they weren't living up to the potential she saw the other day. After talking with Mikako about how those with Center Nova potential have an ability to capture moments of radiance, Yūko takes up photography to try and gain that sense of instinct. Meanwhile, Nagisa is told by Ushiyama that she won't be able to succeed by just mimicking Yūko, and should instead figure out what goal her heart seeks. As Yūko comes to Nagisa, considering her to be a rival for Center Nova, Mimori comes down with a fever, which Tsubasa believes to be a sign of succession. Nagisa is chosen to stand in for her, but Mimori demands to perform on the day of the concert, managing to last til the end of the first performance before Nagisa is brought in. As both Yūko and Chieri shine brightly on the stage, Nagisa publicly states her desire to become Center Nova. Meanwhile, as Mimori starts seeing visions in her fever, something occurs with the Kirara of Succession.
20	7	"Mimori's Revolution"; Transliteration: "Mimori Kakumei" (Japanese: 美森革命)	February 16, 2013
As Mimori awakens from her fever in the hidden temple and undergoes procedures with Tsubasa, Ushiyama reveals to the understudies that the next concert will celebrate Mimori's debut as a successor. Whilst happy for their friend, the girls become anxious as to whether or not Mimori will change from becoming a successor. Elsewhere, Mikako is seen contacting Chieri's father about how to initiate the Center Nova phenomenon. Meanwhile, as Minami gives some encouragement to Kanata, who is secretly downhearted about being the only 75th gen successor left, she learns that Kanata had a fever similar to Mimori's a while back. This leads her to speculate that Kanata was initially supposed to become the next Takamina, but was unable to because of her. When asked what she would do in such a situation, Kanata responds that both Minami and the name of Takamina are important to her. As the day of the concert arrives, it is revealed that Mimori has inherited the name of Mariko Shinoda that Tsubasa previously held. After her debut performance, Mimori brings Kanata on stage to reaffirm their promise to both become successors. Meanwhile, Mikako informs Chieri's father of the three conditions required for initiating the Center Nova phenomenon, who arranges the DES Force to launch an attack on Akibastar.
21	8	"Final Battle on Akibastar"; Transliteration: "Kessen Akibasutā" (Japanese: 決戦アキバスター)	February 23, 2013
Yūko starts practising a lot on the own, causing some worry among her teammates, reminding Tsubasa of how Atsuko was similarly unapproachable when she was Center Nova before she disappeared. Later, Mikako approaches Yūko, telling her that in order to become Center Nova, she will have to embrace her loneliness. The next day during a concert, a DES Battalion launches an attack on Akibastar, putting the city into chaos. Realising this isn't what she wanted, Mikako informs Tsubasa that the organisation behind the DES, Zodiac, are after an element known as Dualium that is hidden in the temple. When AKB struggle against the DES, Mikako changes the battlefield into a guerilla concert to motivate them, unaware that she's playing into Chieri's father's plan. As Tsubasa orders a retreat from Akibastar due to the escalating battle, Yūko takes it upon herself to become the Center Nova, create a large burst of energy that opens a gateway. As this light soon fades away, Yūko is nowhere to be seen.
22	9	"Blue Betrayal"; Transliteration: "Aoi Uragiri" (Japanese: 青い裏切り)	March 2, 2013
As Zodiac begin mining Akibastar for Dualium, AKB0048 barely manage to escape the DES, winding up in the middle of nowhere. Asked about her betrayal, Mikako reveals how Yūko and the previous Center Novae had been taken to another world after obtaining the ultimate radiance. Mikako feared this and abandoned her previous role in AKB, taking the role of a camerawoman to keep others from disappearing like Atsuko did. She then goes on to explain how Chieri's father wanted to capture AKB to use them and the Kirara for military purposes. Tsubasa then explains that Mikako helped him out in the hopes of reaching the other world and rescuing the Center Novae, which is also the reason why Sensei-Sensei resurrected the General Elections. Feeling that there may be a chance to save Yūko, Nagisa decides she wants to become a Center Nova so she can rescue her. When the ship suddenly comes under attack by DES, Mikako breaks free from her cell and goes alone to buy them time to charge their warp drive. Just as Mikako runs out of ammo and comes close to defeat, she is rescued by Minami, with AKB asking for her aid in rescuing Yūko. Recovering Mikako and escaping through the warp gate, the group arrive above a strange planet.
23	10	"Shouting Paradise"; Transliteration: "Zekkyō Paradaisu" (Japanese: 絶叫パラダイス)	March 9, 2013
Whilst the ship undergoes repairs, the understudies are sent to gather data on the planet they landed on. During their exploration, Yūka and Orine come across a strange creature, which Orine decides to name Mofufu. Later that night, the group's campsite is attacked by fierce looking creatures who capture Mofufu. Despite Tsubasa's objections, Orine decides to go on a rescue mission to save Mofufu, with Nagisa, Chieri and Yūka deciding to join her. As the group reach Mofufu's location, Zodiac mechs appear, and start attacking Mofufu's captor, who Orine comes to realise is its mother, but Mikako and the successors manage to hold them off. Mikako explains the planet they are on, Funghistar, is rich in Dualium, with Zodiac plotting to destroy the wildlife in order to mine it. Arriving at a large Dualium crystal, which Orine decides they must defend, the group manage to use the power of song to convince the creatures, the Funghi, they are friendly. The power of the song reacts with the Dualium, producing a light that shuts down the enemy mechs. As a sign of their new friendship, the Funghi give Orine a Dualium crystal shard. Whilst Tsubasa deduces that the resonance between idols and Dualium may help them reclaim Akibastar, Chieri and Nagisa sneak on board one of Zodiac's ships so that Chieri can confront her father face to face.
24	11	"Beyond the Door"; Transliteration: "Tobira no Mukōgawa" (Japanese: 扉の向こう側)	March 16, 2013
Chieri and Nagisa arrive on Sagittariusstar, where they rendezvous with Yasunaga who takes them to Chieri's home whilst he tries to arrange a meeting with her father. Whilst they wait, Chieri tells Nagisa about how she came to learn of AKB0048, leading to her first meeting with Nagisa, Orine and Yūka and the concert they all visited. Following the concert, Chieri had pleaded with her father to let her join AKB, only to be ignored no matter what. Upon learning Zodiac was using weapons against AKB, Chieri ran away from home in order to join the group. As Chieri's father talks with Nagisa's father about his alleged proposal to lift the entertainment ban, he sends his special police to apprehend Nagisa and Chieri. Meanwhile, Tsubasa comes up with a plan to warp directly into Akibastar's underground and cause a Dualium reaction, though it will need all members to reach Center Nova levels of radiance to pull off. Not wanting Nagisa or AKB to be harmed, Chieri goes along with her father's plan to make her a Center Nova. Along the way she runs into Nagisa's father, who explains that even though he and Nagisa walk on different paths, they are still family. Chieri sings for her father and her radiance begins to shine through the door of his office, and as she finishes the song a sudden gunshot is heard. After Yasunaga opens the door, he and Chieri discover her father has been assassinated.
25	12	"The Road to the Stage"; Transliteration: "Gekijō e no Michi" (Japanese: 劇場への道)	March 23, 2013
With Chieri in shock following her father's death, Mamoru and the other WOTA members infiltrate Akibastar, which has been completely taken over by the DGTO, where they rendezvous with Haruna "Kojiharu" Kojima and the 76th gen understudies. Meanwhile, Tsubasa's passion towards wanting to save Akibastar helps encourage the others to push hard with their practise. Just then, a light glows and the AKB members briefly fall unconscious and see a vision in which they ride a mysterious train which arrives at an Akibastar filled with light, indicating they made a reaction with the dualium. However, Nagisa and Chieri remain unconscious as their consciences are still on the train. Arriving at a place Nagisa had seen in her dreams, they spot Yūko struggling to climb a staircase to a theatre where Atsuko and the other Center Novae are, before they both regain consciousness. Tsubasa and Mikako suspect that Yūko wasn't able to fully obtain Center Nova status because of the way she disappeared. As the group prepare to head to Akibastar to put on a concert, Tomomi, who had become able to hear Sensei Sensei, tells them that the key to taking back Akibastar will be the understudy group, No Name. Arriving on Akibastar and beginning their concert, AKB0048 find themselves intimidated by the citizens who felt betrayed by their retreat and turned against them.
26	13	"No Name..."; Transliteration: "Nō Nēmu..." (Japanese: ノーネーム...)	March 30, 2013
Despite the hazing AKB0048 received during their performance, the understudies decide to have faith in their fans and set out to perform, keeping their heads up no matter what insults are thrown at them. Meanwhile, Atsuko appears before Yūko and tells her that the collective unconscious formed through dualium resonance transported the Center Novae to that space to keep on providing hope and light to humanity's unconscious with their entertainment. Back on Akibastar, as the crowd refuse to be swayed from their hatred, Nagisa takes a stand, asking them to not hate entertainment and music. She temporary glows with the resonance of Atsuko and develops the fever of succession, but chooses to keep on performing. During their performance, Yūko appears once again, arranging for photographs of Akibastar to be shown over the concert, reminding the crowd of the love AKB has for its fans. Following the performance, the fans unanimously agree that Nagisa has inherited the name of Atsuko Maeda the 14th. When the DES suddenly attack, Chieri overcomes her desire to avenge her father and instead encourages the others to fight with their music, showing that even DES soldiers have kind hearts and becoming Center Nova in the process. When a DES battleship attempts to stop them, Chieri, Nagisa and the others combine their feelings with the nameless emotions across the galaxy to get the DES fleet to withdraw, returning peace to Akibastar. Afterwards, a special event is held to officially announce Nagisa as Atsuko Maeda the 14th and Chieri as the new Center Nova, followed by a concert with the nine main characters performing.

== Music ==
Opening Theme

- Kibō ni Tsuite by NO NAME (Mayu Watanabe, Sayaka Nakaya, Amina Sato, Haruka Ishida, Kumi Yagami, Sumire Satō, Sawako Hata, Mao Mita, Karen Iwata) (Season 1)
- Aruji Naki Sono Koe by NO NAME (Season 2)

Ending Theme

- Yume wa Nando mo Umarekawaru by NO NAME (Season 1)
- Kono Namida wo Kimi ni Sasagu by NO NAME (Season 2)

Insert Song

- Aitakatta by AKB48 (Episode 1, 3, 8, 9, 21)
- Shōjotachi yo by AKB48 (Episode 1, 15)
- AKB Sanjō! by AKB48 (Episode 2, 17)
- Beginner by AKB48 (Episode 3, 8, 15, 16)
- Ponytail to Shushu by AKB48 (Episode 3, 16, 19)
- Heavy Rotation by AKB48 (Episode 4, 9, 17, 18, 21)
- Shonichi by AKB48 (Episode 4, 14, 16)
- Lemon no Toshigoro by Sumire Satō & Haruka Ishida (Episode 4)
