= List of former members of AKB48 =

The Japanese idol girl group AKB48 has many members who have left the group for various reasons such as focusing on solo careers. Some members have left to help launch AKB48's sister groups. The member lineup often changes as when girls get older, they graduate from the group, and are replaced by members promoted from the trainees. Others have dropped out of the group without any graduation. Yuki Usami was the first member to graduate from the group on March 31, 2006.

Alumnae are presented with the years in which they were on the AKB48 rosters. The list does not include the AKB48 sister group members who were not part of AKB48 proper but might have participated on their singles, events and albums. It also does not include the girls who were exclusively temporary, such as Baito AKB48, unless notable.

== A ==
- Maria Abe (2010–2017)
- Mei Abe (2014–2017)
- Moe Aigasa (2011–2017)
- Sayaka Akimoto (2006–2013)
- Nanami Asai (2016–2024)

== C ==
- Rina Chikano (2007–2014)
- Kurena Cho (2014–2019)

== D ==
- Aki Deguchi (2007)

== E ==
- Aimi Eguchi (2011–2013)

== F ==
- Reina Fujie (2007–2014)
- Natsuki Fujimura (2014–2016)
- Nana Fujita (2012–2019)
- Rei Fujizono (2018–2023)
- Rena Fukuchi (2014–2017)
- Mitsuho Fukutome (2019–2022)
- Nao Furuhata (2014–2015)
- Nazuna Furukawa (2018–2022)

== G ==
- Moe Goto (2013–2019)

== H ==
- Sayuna Hama (2014–2023)
- Riona Hamamatsu (2014–2017)
- Mei Hanada (2024-2026)
- Yuki Harumoto (2017–2021)
- Hikari Hashimoto (2012–2015)
- Yuna Hattori (2016–2023)
- Kaoru Hayano (2006–2009)
- Tsumugi Hayasaka (2014–2018)
- Ayaka Hidaritomo (2014–2023)
- Natsumi Hirajima (2005–2012)
- Hikaru Hirano (2016–2023)
- Rina Hirata (2011–2016)
- Natsuki Hirose (2014–2018)
- Kotone Hitomi (2014-2019)
- Yui Hiwatashi (2015–2019)
- Mai Homma (2016–2021)
- Hitomi Honda (2014–2024)
- Sora Honda (2018–2021)
- Michiru Hoshino (2005–2007)

== I ==
- Manami Ichikawa (2013–2023)
- Miori Ichikawa (2010–2014)
- Miyabi Iino (2014–2018)
- Rina Ikoma (2014–2015)
- Yū Imai (2006–2007)
- Kaori Inagaki (2016–2022)
- Miyuu Inoue (2019–2020)
- Naru Inoue (2007–2009)
- Anna Iriyama (2009–2022)
- Anna Ishida (2012–2013)
- Haruka Ishida (2007–2016)
- Sena Ishiwata (2018–2023)
- Tomomi Itano (2005–2013)
- Kirara Ito (2014–2019)
- Misaki Iwasa (2009–2016)
- Moeka Iwasaki (2014–2016)
- Karen Iwata (2011–2016)
- Rina Izuta (2010–2017)

== K ==
- Yukina Kamachi (2019–2021)
- Tomomi Kasai (2006–2013)
- Yuki Kashiwagi (2007–2024)
- Haruka Katayama (2007–2014)
- Rena Kato (2010–2022)
- Rina Kawaei (2010–2015)
- Misaki Kawahara (2017–2023)
- Saya Kawamoto (2013–2020)
- Nozomi Kawasaki (2005–2009)
- Ayaka Kikuchi (2007–2014)
- Reina Kita (2014–2016)
- Ryoha Kitagawa (2015–2018)
- Rie Kitahara (2007–2015)
- Saki Kitazawa (2011–2023)
- Yuria Kizaki (2014–2017)
- Kana Kobayashi (2006–2016)
- Marina Kobayashi (2010–2015)
- Ran Kobayashi (2018–2023)
- Haruka Kodama (2013–2017)
- Kokone Kohama (2022–2024)
- Haruka Kohara (2007–2010)
- Haruna Kojima (2005–2017)
- Mako Kojima (2012–2019)
- Natsuki Kojima (2010–2018)
- Hitomi Komatani (2005–2008)
- Haruka Komiyama (2013–2025)
- Mika Komori (2008–2013)
- Moeri Kondo (2014–2016)
- Riho Kotani (2012–2013, 2014–2015)
- Satone Kubo (2015–2022)
- Asuka Kuramochi (2007–2015)
- Miyuu Kuramoto (2018–2022)

== M ==
- Chia-ling Ma (2015–2024)
- Ami Maeda (2009–2016)
- Atsuko Maeda (2005–2012)
- Ayaka Maeda (2016–2021)
- Mitsuki Maeda (2012–2015)
- Yuka Masuda (2006–2012)
- Kayano Masuyama (2005–2007)
- Natsumi Matsubara (2006–2013)
- Jurina Matsui (2012–2015)
- Sakiko Matsui (2009–2015)
- Miku Matsumura (2019–2021)
- Yuki Matsuoka (2007–2009)
- Saki Michieda (2016–2023)
- Minami Minegishi (2005-2021)
- Mashiro Mitomo (2018–2022)
- Kaoru Mitsumune (2011–2012)
- Sakura Miyawaki (2014–2018)
- Miho Miyazaki (2007–2022)
- Rira Miyazato (2014–2021)
- Sae Miyazawa (2006–2013)
- Kasumi Mogi (2014–2018)
- Shinobu Mogi (2011–2024)
- Anna Mori (2009–2011)
- Ayaka Morikawa (2010–2015)
- Yui Moriwaki (2014–2015)
- Mion Mukaichi (2013–2026)
- Yuiri Murayama (2011–2025)
- Tomu Muto (2011–2023)

== N ==
- Mariya Nagao (2009–2016)
- Megumi Nagano (2018–2023)
- Haruka Nakagawa (2006–2012)
- Shiori Nakamata (2010–2013)
- Mariko Nakamura (2009–2017)
- Chiyori Nakanishi (2014–2023)
- Rina Nakanishi (2005–2008)
- Yuka Nakanishi (2007–2008)
- Ikumi Nakano (2014–2019)
- Chisato Nakata (2007–2017)
- Tomomi Nakatsuka (2007–2013)
- Sayaka Nakaya (2007–2013)
- Risa Narita (2005–2008)
- Risa Naruse (2007–2009)
- Wakana Natori (2010–2015)
- Rei Nishikawa (2015–2022)
- Miki Nishino (2012–2017)
- Rena Nishiyama (2013–2015)
- Moeno Nito (2007–2013)
- Hinano Noda (2016–2019)
- Reina Noguchi (2007–2009)
- Misato Nonaka (2008–2014)
- Kayo Noro (2006–2010)
- Rena Nozawa (2013–2019)
- Riru Nunoya (2019–2020)

== O ==
- Mina Oba (2009–2014)
- Erina Oda (2014–2024)
- Tomomi Ōe (2005–2008)
- Mayu Ogasawara (2014–2016)
- Megumi Ohori (2006–2010)
- Rin Okabe (2014–2024)
- Ayaka Okada (2011–2017)
- Nana Okada (2012–2023)
- Rina Okada (2018–2023)
- Rio Okawa (2013–2018)
- Manami Oku (2006–2011)
- Chinatsu Okubora (2014)
- Hinako Okuhara (2017–2023)
- Hinano Okumoto (2017–2022)
- Miyu Omori (2011–2023)
- Momoka Onishi (2014–2024)
- Erena Ono (2006–2010)
- Mizuki Onoue (2019–2021)
- Ayumi Orii (2005–2007)
- Mai Ōshima (2005–2009)
- Ryoka Oshima (2011–2017)
- Yuko Oshima (2006–2014)
- Aika Ota (2007–2012)
- Nao Ota (2014–2019)
- Hitomi Ōtake (2018–2024)
- Nana Owada (2013–2017)
- Shizuka Ōya (2007–2021)

== R ==
- Airi Rissen (2018–2021)

== S ==
- Mika Saeki (2007–2009, 2014–2015)
- Haruna Saito (2018–2024)
- Nagisa Sakaguchi (2014–2023)
- Yukari Sasaki (2011–2024)
- Rino Sashihara (2008–2012)
- Akari Sato (2014–2021)
- Amina Sato (2007–2014)
- Kiara Sato (2013–2023)
- Minami Sato (2016–2024)
- Nanami Sato (2014–2019)
- Natsuki Satō (2006–2012)
- Shiori Satō (2014-2019)
- Sumire Sato (2008–2014)
- Yukari Sato (2005–2010)
- Nagisa Shibuya (2014–2018)
- Haruka Shimada (2009–2017)
- Haruka Shimazaki (2009–2016)
- Maria Shimizu (2014–2023)
- Hinana Shimoguchi (2014–2024)
- Mariko Shinoda (2006–2013)
- Ayana Shinozaki (2011–2024)
- Karin Shiobara (2019–2020)
- Miru Shiroma (2015–2018)
- Mariya Suzuki (2009–2017)
- Shihori Suzuki (2009–2015)
- Yuka Suzuki (2019–2021)

== T ==
- Kyoka Tada (2018–2023)
- Manaka Taguchi (2016–2026)
- Ayana Takada (2006–2007)
- Juri Takahashi (2012–2019)
- Minami Takahashi (2005–2016)
- Sayaka Takahashi (2016–2023)
- Aki Takajo (2008–2016)
- Kaoru Takaoka (2014–2023)
- Yurina Takashima (2011–2014)
- Miyu Takeuchi (2009–2019)
- Kayoko Takita (2013–2022)
- Miku Tanabe (2007–2017)
- Yuri Tani (2014–2017)
- Megu Taniguchi (2013–2024)
- Hijiri Tanikawa (2014-2019)
- Yuuka Tano (2011–2018)
- Makiho Tatsuya (2013-2020)
- Misaki Taya (2016–2019)
- Misaki Terada (2016–2019)
- Hana Tojima (2005–2008)
- Mio Tomonaga (2014–2018)
- Mizuki Tsuchiyasu (2013–2015)
- Mariko Tsukamoto (2014)

== U ==
- Mayumi Uchida (2007–2015)
- Natsuki Uchiyama (2012–2016)
- Sorano Uemi (2019–2023)
- Ayako Uemura (2006)
- Ayaka Umeda (2006–2014)
- Ayano Umeta (2011–2017)
- Kazumi Urano (2005–2010)
- Yuki Usami (2005–2006)
- Hatsuka Utada (2016–2023)

== W ==
- Mayu Watanabe (2007–2017)
- Miyuki Watanabe (2012–2014, 2015–2016)
- Shiho Watanabe (2005–2007)

== Y ==
- Nako Yabuki (2015–2017)
- Moka Yaguchi (2014–2018)
- Fuuko Yagura (2013–2015)
- Moeka Yahagi (2018–2020)
- Ayu Yamabe (2015–2023)
- Kyoka Yamada (2017–2023)
- Nanami Yamada (2014–2019)
- Ai Yamamoto (2014–2016)
- Ruka Yamamoto (2014–2020)
- Sayaka Yamamoto (2014–2016)
- Suzuran Yamauchi (2009–2014)
- Kana Yasuda (2016–2022)
- Yuri Yokomichi (2014-2019)
- Aeri Yokoshima (2013–2017)
- Erena Saeed Yokota (2011–2012)
- Yui Yokoyama (Team A) (2010–2021)
- Yui Yokoyama (Team 8) (2014–2021)
- Rumi Yonezawa (2007–2012)
- Karen Yoshida (2015–2023)
- Yuzuka Yoshihashi (2018–2023)
- Nanase Yoshikawa (2014–2023)
- Miyu Yoshino (2014–2017)
- Ami Yumoto (2013–2023)

== See also ==
- List of AKB48 members
