= Give Me Five! (song) =

Single by AKB48

from the album 1830m
- B-side: "Sweet & Bitter"; "New Ship" (Type A); "Hitsujikai no Tabi" (Type B); "Yungu ya Furoito no Baai" (Theater Version)
- Released: February 15, 2012 (Japan)
- Recorded: 2012
- Genre: J-pop, rock
- Label: You, Be Cool! / King
- Songwriter(s): Yasushi Akimoto (lyrics)
- Producer(s): Yasushi Akimoto

AKB48 singles chronology
"Ue kara Mariko" (2011)	"Give Me Five!" (2012)	"Manatsu no Sounds Good!" (2012)

Music videos
- Give Me Five! on YouTube
- Sweet & Bitter (preview) on YouTube

"Give Me Five!" is the 25th single by the Japanese girl idol group AKB48. It is also AKB48's fifth sakura-themed single, and their first single of 2012. This single was released in Japan on February 15, 2012.

Give Me Five! is AKB48's fifth sakura-themed single. However, unlike the previous ones, this single's title doesn't contain the word sakura.

The music video for the song Give Me Five! is a 34-minute Japanese television drama-like style video. This video was directed by Shigemichi Sugita, and it stars AKB48 members Atsuko Maeda, Yuko Oshima, Yuki Kashiwagi, Minami Takahashi. Actor Takanori Jinnai also stars in the music video.

Give Me Five sold approximately 967,000 copies on its debut day, thus making it AKB48's 12th single to achieve No.1 on the Oricon charts.

Not to be confused with another song title, "Give me Five!" by Chihiro Yonekura, for the 3rd Fairy Tail OVA opening intro.

== Production ==
=== Give Me Five! ===
Give Me Five! was sung by a band called Baby Blossom comprising 18 selected members from AKB48 and its sister groups SKE48 and NMB48. The band is led by Atsuko Maeda, who is playing the rhythm guitar, and Yuko Oshima, who is playing a bass guitar. Other members of the band include Minami Takahashi, who is playing the lead guitar, Yuki Kashiwagi, who is in charge of the drums, Mayu Watanabe, who is playing the keyboard, Haruna Kojima, who is on the synthesizer, Rino Sashihara and Minami Minegishi, who are playing the trombones, Rena Matsui and Yui Yokoyama, who are playing the trumpets, Jurina Matsui, who is playing the standing drums, Mariko Shinoda, who plays the tambourine, and Tomomi Itano, who is playing the shaker. Sae Miyazawa, Rie Kitahara, Aki Takajō, Tomomi Kasai and Sayaka Yamamoto are the band's chorus.

This band was formed in secret by AKB48's producer Yasushi Akimoto on 28 August 2011. During the five months prior to the official revelation of the band, the 18 members trained in secret in between their performance schedules. Members of the rock band Gacharic Spin were some of their coaches. Out of the 18 band members, only three had previously played the musical instrument they are playing this time (some of them have played other instruments). They are Yuko Oshima, who played the bass guitar during her high school days, Rena Matsui and Rino Sashihara, who had previously played the trumpet and trombone respectively. Baby Blossom was officially revealed to the public during the 4th and last day of concert AKB48 Request Hour Set List Best 100 2012, held on January 22, 2012. At the event, the members performed the song Give Me Five! for the first time.

=== Music video ===
The music video was directed by director Shigemichi Sugita. The music video stars AKB48 members Atsuko Maeda, Yuko Oshima, Yuki Kashiwagi, Minami Takahashi and actor Takanori Jinnai. The filming of this music video took place in a high school located in Saitama Prefecture during end-November 2011.

This music video tells the story of four students, all of whom comes from troubled backgrounds. Atsuko Maeda plays the role of Atsuko Ogata, a girl whose parents divorced and subsequently went to Tokyo. Yuko Oshima plays Yuko Osawa, a girl who secretly works at a brothel to cover household expenses. Yuki Kashiwagi stars as Yuki Kobayashi, a girl who is mentally troubled after being bullied at school. Minami Takahashi plays the role of Minami Ichikawa, a quick-tempered girl who can never stay in one job for long. Takanori Jinnai stars as the quartet's homeroom teacher. The four of them, on the suggestion of their teacher, formed a music band named Baby Blossom. Together, they mature and gradually become self-confident.Ryosuke Miura as Ankh and Shu Watanabe as Eji Hino from Kamen Rider OOO made a cameo.

The music video is included in both the Type-A and Type-B versions of this single. It was made available for viewing on the group's official YouTube channel on May 22 .

== Announcement ==
Some information on this single was announced on December 12, 2011. However, the title of the single was not revealed in that announcement. The title was later published at the King Records official site on January 2, 2012. On January 22, 2012, AKB48 performed the title song in concert for the first time, during the group's Request Hour Set List Best 100 2012 concert held at Tokyo Dome City Hall. During that performance, it was unveiled that the title track of this single, Give Me Five!, will be performed by a specially-formed band named Baby Blossom. The band comprises selected members who played different musical instruments.

== Release details ==
Give Me Five! was officially released in Japan on February 15, 2012.

The single is available in 5 versions: Type-A Regular and Limited Editions, Type-B Regular and Limited, and Theater Edition.

All regular editions are CD+DVD. They come sealed and include a bonus: the limited editions have a randomly seeded ticket for 1 of 2 nationwide handshake events, and the regular editions have 1 randomly seeded photo of a member out of the 18-photo set created exclusively for the single.

The Theater Edition is CD only. It comes with a ticket for a large release event at AKB48 Theater. Plus, since the edition is intended for being sold at AKB48 Theater, the buyer can in person pick 1 member photo out of a large photoset created especially for the theater edition of the single.

In total, the single sold 967,000 copies on the first day of their release.

== Reception ==
Give Me Five! sold approximately 967,000 copies on its debut day. This makes it the AKB48's third-highest selling single on its release day, behind singles Kaze wa Fuiteiru (which sold 1.046 million copies on its release day) and Flying Get (which sold 1.026 million copies on its release day).

In total, Give Me Five! sold 1.287 million copies on its debut week. This makes it AKB48's 12th single that topped the Oricon charts, and its 6th consecutive million-selling single.

== Track listing ==
=== Type A ===
CD
No.	Title	Artist(s)	Length
1.	"Give Me Five!" (GIVE ME FIVE!)
2.	"Sweet & Bitter" (スイート&ビター)	Selection 6
3.	"New Ship" (NEW SHIP)	Special Girls A
4.	"Give Me Five! (Off Vocal Ver.)" (GIVE ME FIVE! off vocal ver.)
5.	"Sweet & Bitter (Off Vocal Ver.)" (スイート&ビター off vocal ver.)
6.	"New Ship (Off Vocal Ver.)" (NEW SHIP off vocal ver.)

DVD
No.	Title	Length
1.	"Give Me Five! Music Video" (GIVE ME FIVE! Music Video)
2.	"Sweet & Bitter Music Video" (スイート&ビター Music Video)
3.	"New Ship Music Video" (NEW SHIP Music Video)
4.	"Give Me Five! Making Zenpen" (GIVE ME FIVE! MAKING 前編)
5.	"Utsukushī Mix Kōza" (美しいMIX講座)

=== Type B ===
CD
No.	Title	Artist(s)	Length
1.	"Give Me Five!" (GIVE ME FIVE!)
2.	"Sweet & Bitter" (スイート&ビター)	Selection 6
3.	"Hitsujikai no Tabi" (羊飼いの旅)	Special Girls B
4.	"Give Me Five! (Off Vocal Ver.)" (GIVE ME FIVE! off vocal ver.)
5.	"Sweet & Bitter (Off Vocal Ver.)" (スイート&ビター off vocal ver.)
6.	"Hitsujikai no Tabi (Off Vocal Ver.)" (羊飼いの旅 off vocal ver.)

DVD
No.	Title	Length
1.	"Give Me Five! Music Video" (GIVE ME FIVE! Music Video)
2.	"Sweet & Bitter Music Video" (スイート&ビター Music Video)
3.	"Hitsujikai no Tabi Music Video" (羊飼いの旅 Music Video)
4.	"Give Me Five! Making Kōhen" (GIVE ME FIVE! MAKING 後編)
5.	"Utsukushī Overture & Encore Kōza" (美しいoverture&アンコール講座)

=== Theater Version ===
CD
No.	Title	Artist(s)	Length
1.	"Give Me Five!" (GIVE ME FIVE!)
2.	"Sweet & Bitter" (スイート&ビター)	Selection 6
3.	"Yungu ya Furoito no Baai" (ユングやフロイトの場合)	Special Girls C
4.	"Give Me Five! (Off Vocal Ver.)" (GIVE ME FIVE! off vocal ver.)
5.	"Sweet & Bitter (Off Vocal Ver.)" (スイート&ビター off vocal ver.)
6.	"Yungu ya Furoito no Baai (Off Vocal Ver.)" (ユングやフロイトの場合 off vocal ver.)

== Bonus ==
=== Types A, B ===
- (Limited Edition) Random national handshake event ticket (sealed in, 2 kinds in total available)
- (Regular Edition) Random photo of a member (sealed in, one per senbatsu member, i.e. 18 kinds in total, available)

=== Theater Edition ===
- Large handshake event ticket
- Photo of a member (selectable from a set, one kind per member available)

== Members ==
=== "Give Me Five!" ===
Center: Atsuko Maeda

- Team A: Haruna Kojima, Rino Sashihara, Mariko Shinoda, Aki Takajō, Minami Takahashi, Atsuko Maeda
- Team K: Tomomi Itano, Yūko Ōshima, Minami Minegishi, Sae Miyazawa, Yui Yokoyama
- Team B: Tomomi Kasai, Yuki Kashiwagi, Rie Kitahara, Mayu Watanabe
- SKE48 Team S: Jurina Matsui, Rena Matsui
- NMB48 Team N: Sayaka Yamamoto

Note: The selected members are the same as on "Kaze wa Fuiteiru".

=== "Sweet & Bitter" ===
Sung by Selection 6 (セレクション6): Center: Minami Takahashi, Atsuko Maeda

- Team A: Rino Sashihara, Mariko Shinoda, Minami Takahashi, Atsuko Maeda
- Team K: Tomomi Itano, Yūko Ōshima

=== "New Ship" ===
Sung by Special Girls A (スペシャルガールズA): Center: Jurina Matsui, Melody Nurramdhani Laksani

- Team B: Sumire Satō
- Team 4: Miori Ichikawa, Anna Iriyama, Haruka Shimazaki, Suzuran Yamauchi
- Kenkyūsei: Karen Iwata, Rena Katō, Rina Kawaei, Juri Takahashi, Yuka Tano
- SKE48 Team S: Yuria Kizaki, Jurina Matsui
- SKE48 Team E: Kanon Kimoto
- NMB48 Team N: Miyuki Watanabe
- HKT48 (then Kenkyūsei): Haruka Kodama
- JKT48 (then Kenkyūsei): Melody Nurramdhani Laksani

=== "Hitsujikai no Tabi" ===
Sung by Special Girls B (スペシャルガールズB): Center: Yuki Kashiwagi, Mayu Watanabe

- Team A: Misaki Iwasa, Aika Ōta, Haruka Katayama, Asuka Kuramochi, Haruna Kojima, Aki Takajō
- Team K: Sayaka Akimoto, Ayaka Umeda, Ayaka Kikuchi, Reina Fujie, Sakiko Matsui, Minami Minegishi, Sae Miyazawa, Yui Yokoyama
- Team B: Tomomi Kasai, Yuki Kashiwagi, Rie Kitahara, Amina Sato, Yuka Masuda, Mayu Watanabe
- Team 4: Haruka Shimada, Mariya Nagao
- SKE48 Team S: Rena Matsui
- SKE48 Team KII: Akane Takayanagi

=== "Yungu ya Furoito no Baai" ===
Sung by Special Girls C (スペシャルガールズC)

- Team A: Shizuka Ōya, Haruka Nakagawa, Chisato Nakata, Sayaka Nakaya, Ami Maeda, Natsumi Matsubara
- Team K: Mayumi Uchida, Miku Tanabe, Tomomi Nakatsuka, Moeno Nitō, Misato Nonaka, Rumi Yonezawa
- Team B: Haruka Ishida, Kana Kobayashi, Mika Komori, Natsuki Satō, Shihori Suzuki, Mariya Suzuki, Rina Chikano, Natsumi Hirajima, Miho Miyazaki
- Team 4: Maria Abe, Miyu Takeuchi, Shiori Nakamata, Mariko Nakamura
- Kenkyūsei: Rina Izuta, Miyū Ōmori, Natsuki Kojima, Marina Kobayashi, Erena Saeed Yokota, Yukari Sasaki, Rika Suzuki, Wakana Natori, Rina Hirata, Nana Fujita, Tomu Muto, Ayaka Morikawa

== Charts ==
Chart (2012)	Peak position
Japan (Oricon Weekly Singles Chart)	1
Japan (Japan Hot 100)	1
Japan (RIAJ Digital Track Chart)	1
Taiwan G-music Combo	19

=== Sales and certifications ===
Chart	Amount
Oricon physical sales	1,436,519
RIAJ full-length cellphone downloads	Gold (100,000+)
