= Mitsumune =

Mitsumune (written: 光宗) is a Japanese surname. Notable people with the surname include:

- Kaoru Mitsumune (光宗 薫, born 1993), Japanese actress and model
- Shinkichi Mitsumune (光宗 信吉, born 1963), Japanese composer
