= Gingham Check =

2012 single by AKB48

- Regular Edition Type A Cover

Single by AKB48

from the album Tsugi no Ashiato
- B-side: "Yume no Kawa" (Type A & Theater Edition); "Doremifa Onchi" (Type A); "Nante Bohemian" (Type B); "Show fight!" (Type B); "Ano Hi no Fūrin" (Theater Edition)
- Released: August 29, 2012 (Japan)
- Genre: J-pop
- Label: You, Be Cool! / King
- Composer: Yūsuke Itagaki
- Lyricist: Yasushi Akimoto
- Producer: Yasushi Akimoto

AKB48 singles chronology
| "Manatsu no Sounds Good!" (2012) | "Gingham Check" (2012) | "Uza" (2012) |

AKB48 songs singles chronology
| "Sugar Rush" (2012) |

Music videos
- Gingham Check on YouTube
- ""Yume no Kawa" (preview)"
- "Nante Bohemian" / Under Girls (preview) on YouTube

"Gingham Check" (ギンガムチェック, Gingamu Chekku) is the 27th major single by the Japanese idol girl group AKB48. The members were chosen from their placements in the AKB48's 2012 general election. The single was released in Japan on August 29, 2012. It includes the graduation song for long-time headlining member Atsuko Maeda.

== 2012 general election ==
On March 26, 2012, AKB48 announced it would be holding an election to determine the lineup for its 27th major single. The field of candidates consisted of 243 members from AKB48, SKE48, NMB48, and HKT48, and the ballots were available in the group's 26th single, "Manatsu no Sounds Good!" The election results were announced on June 6 at Nippon Budokan and results were broadcast live on TV for the first time. Yuko Oshima came first, followed by Mayu Watanabe and Yuki Kashiwagi.

This is the first single without Atsuko Maeda in the main lineup (excluding rock-paper-scissors singles) as she did not participate as a candidate in the election, and graduated from the group two days before the single's release. This is the second time Yuko Oshima became AKB48's center since "Heavy Rotation". This is also the last senbatsu participation for long-time AKB48 member Tomomi Kasai.

== Promotion and release ==
The single was released in three versions: Type A, Type B and Theater Edition.

== Music video ==
The video is directed by Joseph Kahn. and features actors Hideo Ishiguro (Kamen Rider Den-O), Kouhei Takeda (Hana Kimi, Kamen Rider Kiva), Dori Sakurada (Kamen Rider New Den-O) and Akira Nakao. Yuko Oshima and Mayu Watanabe appeared in the video in two teams of black (Oshima's) and red (Watanabe's). Atsuko Maeda also makes an appearance in the video.

The video consists of three story-lines that parody films: terrorists invade a police department, a schoolgirl explores a haunted hospital and a Golza from Ultraman Tiga attacks a city. It features a battle between the Motorgirls and the Car Devils.

== Track listing ==
=== Type A ===
Disc 1 (CD)
| No. | Title | Artist(s) | Length |
|---|---|---|---|
| 1. | "Gingham Check" (ギンガムチェック) | | 5:27 |
| 2. | "Yume no Kawa" (夢の河) | Atsuko Maeda, Minami Takahashi, Tomomi Itano, Yūko Ōshima, Haruna Kojima, Mariko Shinoda, Yuki Kashiwagi, Mayu Watanabe, Minami Minegishi, Jurina Matsui | 4:35 |
| 3. | "Doremifa Onchi" (ドレミファ音痴) | Next Girls | 4:36 |
| 4. | "Gingham Check off vocal ver." (ギンガムチェック off vocal ver.) | | 5:27 |
| 5. | "Yume no Kawa off vocal ver." (夢の河 off vocal ver.) | | 4:35 |
| 6. | "Doremifa Onchi off vocal ver." (ドレミファ音痴 off vocal ver.) | | 4:36 |

Disc 2 (DVD)
| No. | Title | Length |
|---|---|---|
| 1. | "Gingham Check Music Video" (ギンガムチェック Music Video) |
| 2. | "Yume no Kawa Music Video" (夢の河 Music Video) |
| 3. | "Doremifa Onchi Music Video" (ドレミファ音痴 Music Video) |
| 4. | "27th Single Senbatsu General Election Documentary" (27thシングル選抜総選挙ドキュメント) |

=== Type B ===
Disc 1 (CD)
| No. | Title | Artist(s) | Length |
|---|---|---|---|
| 1. | "Gingham Check" (ギンガムチェック) | | 5:27 |
| 2. | "Nante Bohemian" (なんてボヘミアン) | Under Girls | 3:40 |
| 3. | "Show fight!" (Show fight!) | Future Girls | 3:49 |
| 4. | "Gingham Check off vocal ver." (ギンガムチェック off vocal ver.) | | 5:27 |
| 5. | "Nante Bohemian off vocal ver." (なんてボヘミアン off vocal ver.) | | 3:40 |
| 6. | "Show fight! off vocal ver." (Show fight! off vocal ver.) | | 3:49 |

Disc 2 (DVD)
| No. | Title | Length |
|---|---|---|
| 1. | "Gingham Check Music Video" (ギンガムチェック Music Video) |
| 2. | "Nante Bohemian Music Video" (なんてボヘミアン Music Video) |
| 3. | "Show fight! Music Video" (Show fight! Music Video) |
| 4. | "AKB48 Group Members 『Self Taken Picture Courses』" (AKB48 グループメンバーによる『自撮り講座・釣り講座』) |
| 5. | "AKB48 Group Members 『Self Taken Picture Gallery』" (AKB48 グループメンバーによる『自撮り釣り写真ギャラリー』) |

=== Theater Edition ===
Disc 1 (CD)
| No. | Title | Artist(s) | Length |
|---|---|---|---|
| 1. | "Gingham Check" (ギンガムチェック) | | 5:27 |
| 2. | "Yume no Kawa" (夢の河) | Maeda Atsuko, Minami Takahashi, Tomomi Itano, Yūko Ōshima, Haruna Kojima, Mariko Shinoda, Yuki Kashiwagi, Mayu Watanabe, Minami Minegishi, Jurina Matsui | 4:35 |
| 3. | "Ano Hi no Fūrin" (あの日の風鈴) | Waiting Girls | 4:25 |
| 4. | "Gingham Check off vocal ver." (ギンガムチェック off vocal ver.) | | 5:27 |
| 5. | "Yume no Kawa off vocal ver." (夢の河 off vocal ver.) | | 4:35 |
| 6. | "Ano Hi no Fūrin off vocal ver." (あの日の風鈴 off vocal ver.) | | 4:25 |

== Personnel ==
=== "Gingham Check" ===
The lineup for the title track consists of the top 16 members from AKB48's 2012 general election.
Center: Yūko Ōshima

- Team A: Haruna Kojima, Mariko Shinoda, Minami Takahashi
- Team K: Tomomi Itano, Ayaka Umeda, Yūko Ōshima, Minami Minegishi, Sae Miyazawa, Yui Yokoyama
- Team B: Tomomi Kasai, Yuki Kashiwagi, Rie Kitahara, Mayu Watanabe
- SKE48 Team S / AKB48 Team K: Jurina Matsui
- SKE48 Team S: Rena Matsui
- HKT48 Team H: Rino Sashihara

=== "Yume no Kawa" ===
Atsuko Maeda's graduation song. Maeda had graduated two days prior to the single's release.

- Team A: Haruna Kojima, Mariko Shinoda, Minami Takahashi, Atsuko Maeda
- Team K: Tomomi Itano, Yūko Ōshima, Minami Minegishi
- Team B: Yuki Kashiwagi, Mayu Watanabe
- SKE48 Team S / AKB48 Team K: Jurina Matsui

=== "Nante Bohemian" ===
Performed by Under Girls, which consist of members who ranked 17 to 32 in AKB48's 2012 general election.
Center: Aki Takajō

- Team A: Asuka Kuramochi, Aki Takajō
- Team K: Sayaka Akimoto
- Team B: Amina Satō, Yuka Masuda
- Team 4: Haruka Shimazaki
- SKE48 Team S: Masana Oya, Yuria Kizaki, Akari Suda, Kumi Yagami
- SKE48 Team KII: Shiori Ogiso, Akane Takayanagi, Sawako Hata, Airi Furukawa
- NMB48 Team N / AKB48 Team B: Miyuki Watanabe
- NMB48 Team N: Sayaka Yamamoto

=== "Doremifa Onchi" ===
Performed by Next Girls, which consist of members who ranked 33 to 48 in AKB48's 2012 general election.
Center: Misaki Iwasa

- Team A: Misaki Iwasa, Haruka Katayama, Haruka Nakagawa, Chisato Nakata, Sayaka Nakaya, Ami Maeda
- Team K: Reina Fujie
- Team B: Kana Kobayashi, Miho Miyazaki
- Team 4: Yuka Tano, Mariya Nagao
- SKE48 Team KII: Manatsu Mukaida
- SKE48 Kenkyūsei: Matsumura Kaori
- NMB48 Team N: Aina Fukumoto, Nana Yamada
- HKT48 Team H: Sakura Miyawaki

=== "Show fight!" ===
Performed by Future Girls, which consist of members who ranked 49 to 64 in AKB48's 2012 general election.
Center: Tomu Muto

- Team A: Aika Ōta, Shizuka Ōya
- Team K: Ayaka Kikuchi, Moeno Nito, Sakiko Matsui
- Team B: Haruka Ishida, Mika Komori, Sumire Satō
- Team 4: Miori Ichikawa, Mina Ōba, Suzuran Yamauchi
- Team Kenkyūsei: Tomu Muto
- SKE48 Team S: Yuka Nakanishi
- SKE48 Team KII: Miki Yakata
- SKE48 Team E: Kanon Kimoto
- NMB48 Team N: Mayu Ogasawara

=== "Ano Hi no Fūrin" ===
Performed by Waiting Girls, which consist of members who participated as a candidate for AKB48's 2012 general election, but did not place in the top 64. There were a total of 171 members in this group.

- Team A: Natsumi Matsubara
- Team K: Mayumi Uchida, Miku Tanabe, Tomomi Nakatsuka, Misato Nonaka
- Team B: Natsuki Satō, Shihori Suzuki, Mariya Suzuki, Rina Chikano
- Team 4: Maria Abe, Anna Iriyama, Karen Iwata, Rena Kato, Rina Kawaei, Haruka Shimada, Juri Takahashi, Miyu Takeuchi, Shiori Nakamata, Mariko Nakamura
- Undecided Team: Rina Izuta, Natsuki Kojima, Marina Kobayashi, Wakana Natori, Nana Fujita, Ayaka Morikawa
- Kenkyūsei: Moe Aigasa, Maika Amemiya, Saho Iwatate, Ayano Umeta, Ryoka Oshima, Ayaka Okada, Shiori Kita, Saki Kitazawa, Erena Saeed-Yokota, Yukari Sasaki, Ayana Shinozaki, Yurina Takashima, Haruna Hasegawa, Rina Hirata, Kaoru Mitsumune, Yuiri Murayama, Shinobu Mogi, Sakura Moriyama, Nene Watanabe
- SKE48 Team S: Rumi Kato, Yukiko Kinoshita, Mizuki Kuwabara, Shiori Takada, Aki Deguchi, Kanako Hiramatsu
- SKE48 Team KII: Riirina Akeda, Riho Abiru, Anna Ishida, Tomoko Kato, Risako Goto, Seira Sato, Mieko Sato, Rina Matsumoto, Rieka Yamada
- SKE48 Team E: Kyoka Isohara, Kasumi Ueno, Madoka Umemoto, Shiori Kaneko, Ami Kobayashi, Mei Sakai, Aya Shibata, Yumana Takagi, Mai Takeuchi, Rika Tsuzuki, Minami Hara, Yukari Yamashita
- SKE48 Kenkyūsei: Shiori Iguchi, Narumi Ichino, Asana Inuzuka, Tsugumi Iwanaga, Mikoto Uchiyama, Yuna Ego, Arisa Ōwaki, Risa Ogino, Momona Kitō, Emiri Kobayashi, Makiko Saito, Nanako Suga, Sayaka Niidoi, Miki Hioki, Mizuki Fujimoto, Haruka Futamura, Nao Furuhata, Honoka Mizuno, Ami Miyamae, Mizuho Yamada
- NMB48 Team N: Kanako Kadowaki, Rika Kishino, Haruna Kinoshita, Riho Kotani, Rina Kondō, Kanna Shinohara, Kei Jōnishi, Miru Shiroma, Shiori Matsuda, Yūki Yamaguchi, Akari Yoshida
- NMB48 Team M: Riona Ōta, Ayaka Okita, Rena Kawakami, Momoka Kinoshita, Rena Shimada, Eriko Jo, Yui Takano, Airi Tanigawa, Ayame Hikawa, Runa Fujita, Mao Mita, Ayaka Murakami, Sae Murase, Fūko Yagura, Natsumi Yamagishi, Keira Yogi
- NMB48 Kenkyūsei: Hono Akazawa, Hono Akazawa, Yuki Azuma, Anri Ishizuka, Yūmi Ishida, Anna Ijiri, Mirei Ueda, Mizuki Uno, Mako Umehara, Yūri Ōta, Yūka Kato, Emika Kamieda, Konomi Kusaka, Rina Kushiro, Hazuki Kurokawa, Saki Kōno, Narumi Koga, Rikako Kobayashi, Arisa Koyanagi, Sorai Satō, Nanami Sasaki, Riko Takayama, Sora Tōgō, Hiromi Nakagawa, Rurina Nishizawa, Momoka Hayashi, Riko Hisada, Arisa Miura, Kanako Muro, Shu Yabushita, Tsubasa Yamauchi, Hitomi Yamamoto
- HKT48 Team H: Chihiro Anai, Nao Ueki, Serina Kumazawa, Haruka Kodama, Yui Komori, Yuki Shimono, Yūko Sugamoto, Natsumi Tanaka, Airi Taniguchi, Chiyori Nakanishi, Natsumi Matsuoka, Anna Murashige, Aoi Motomura, Madoka Moriyasu, Haruka Wakatabe
- HKT48 Kenkyūsei: Kyōka Abe, Mina Imada, Sayaka Etō, Ayaka Nakanishi, Maiko Fukagawa

== Charts ==
=== Oricon (Japan) ===
| Release | Oricon Singles Chart | Peak position | Debut sales (copies) | Sales total (copies) |
|---|---|---|---|---|
| August 29, 2012 | Daily Chart | 1 | 906,617 | 1,314,428 |
| August 29, 2012 | Weekly Chart | 1 | 1,181,966 | 1,314,428 |
| August 29, 2012 | Monthly Chart | 1 | 1,181,966 | 1,314,428 |
| August 29, 2012 | Yearly Chart | 3 | 1,303,407 | 1,314,428 |

=== G-music (Taiwan) ===
| Chart | Peak position |
|---|---|
| Combo | 18 |

== Release history ==
| Date | Version | Catalog | Format | Label |
|---|---|---|---|---|
| August 29, 2012 | Type-A | First Press Limited Edition (KIZM-90167~8); Regular Edition (KIZM-167~8) | CD+DVD | King Records |
| August 29, 2012 | Type-B | First Press Limited Edition (KIZM-90169~70); Regular Edition (KIZM-169~70) | CD+DVD | King Records |
| August 29, 2012 | Theater | Regular Version (NMAX-1131) | CD | King Records |

== JKT48 Version ==
"Gingham Check"
- Regular Version

Single by JKT48

from the album JKT48 Festival Greatest Hits
- B-side: "Gingham Check; Utsukushii Inazuma- Kilat yang Indah -; Kondo Koso Ecstasy - Kali ini Ecstasy -; Boku wa Ganbaru - Aku Akan Berjuang -; Sakura no Hanabiratachi - Kelopak-kelopak Bunga Sakura -; Gingham Check-English Version-
- Released: June 11, 2014
- Genre: Pop
- Label: Hits

JKT48 singles chronology
| "Flying Get" (2014) | "Gingham Check" (2014) | "Kokoro no Placard -Papan Penanda Isi Hati-" (2014) |

"Gingham Check" is the sixth released single from the Indonesian idol girl group JKT48.

=== Promotion and release ===
JKT48 held their first Members Election to select members that would participate for this single. The single was released in a dedicated concert on 11 June 2014.

=== Track listing ===
The single has two editions: the regular version (CD+DVD) and theater version (CD only) (one distributed in ALFA MIDI · LAWSON and one from JKT48 theater).

==== Regular version ====
CD
| No. | Title | Length |
|---|---|---|
| 1. | "Gingham Check" |
| 2. | "Utsukushii Inazuma - Kilat yang Indah -" |
| 3. | "Kondo Koso Ecstasy - Kali ini Ecstasy -" |
| 4. | "Boku wa Ganbaru - Aku Akan Berjuang -" |
| 5. | "Sakura no Hanabiratachi - Kelopak-kelopak Bunga Sakura -" |
| 6. | "Gingham Check" (English version) |

DVD
| No. | Title | Length |
|---|---|---|
| 1. | "Gingham Check Music Video" |
| 2. | "Gingham Check Music Video Behind the Scenes" |

Bonus

- Member photo
- Member's autographed card message (First 10,000 buyers)

==== Theater version ====
CD
| No. | Title | Writer(s) | Length |
|---|---|---|---|
| 1. | "Gingham Check" | Yasushi Akimoto |
| 2. | "Utsukushii Inazuma - Kilat yang Indah -" |
| 3. | "Kondo Koso Ecstasy - Kali ini Ecstasy -" |
| 4. | "Boku wa Ganbaru - Aku Akan Berjuang -" |
| 5. | "Sakura no Hanabiratachi - Kelopak-kelopak Bunga Sakura –" |

Bonus

ALFA MIDI · LAWSON

- Call card
- Trump card

JKT48 Theater

- Trump card
- Handshake ticket
