= Manatsu no Sounds Good! =

2012 single by AKB48

- cover for Type-A edition

Single by AKB48

from the album Tsugi no Ashiato
- B-side: "Mittsu no Namida"
- Released: May 23, 2012 (Japan)
- Genre: J-pop
- Label: You, Be Cool! / King
- Songwriter: Yasushi Akimoto (lyrics)
- Producer: Yasushi Akimoto

AKB48 singles chronology
"Give Me Five!" (2012)	"Manatsu no Sounds Good!" (2012)	"Gingham Check" (2012)

Music video
- Manatsu no Sounds Good! (Dance Ver.) on YouTube

"Manatsu no Sounds Good!" (真夏のSounds good !; "Midsummer 'Sounds good !'") (Note: In the Japanese official title, there is a space between "good" and "!". (真夏のSounds good !)) is the 26th single by the Japanese girl idol group AKB48, released in Japan on May 23, 2012.

In its first week, the CD single sold 1,616,795 copies according to Oricon and became AKB48's bestselling single. In August 2012, it was certified "2 Million" by RIAJ. On December 30, 2012, the song won the Grand Prix at the 54th Japan Record Awards, making this their second consecutive win for the group.

The single is Atsuko Maeda and Asuka Kuramochi's final senbatsu recording with the group.

== Release ==
"Manatsu no Sounds Good" comprises various editions released on May 23, 2012.

The first presses of the single came with a ticket to vote in the AKB48 27th Single Senbatsu Election (to choose the members to be featured in the next AKB48's single, to be released in the summer.)

The Type-A edition comes in a CD+DVD set, consisting of six tracks, half of which are off vocal versions, as well as four music videos and a member profile track. The Type-B edition is also a CD+DVD set, composed of the same tracks as Type-A except "Chōdai, Darling!", which is replaced by "Gugutasu no Sora". Both editions are available with an alternative cover on the group's first pressings.

The Theater edition comes in a CD with the same tracks as Type-A but "Chōdai, Darling!", which is replaced by "Kimi no Tame ni Boku Wa".

As of the day of its release, AKB48 shipped a personal record of 2.0 million copies. (Note: In 2013, AKB48's shipment record for a single was broken by "Sayonara Crawl" with 2.3 million copies. - "ＡＫＢ最新曲が過去最多の初回230万枚". Nikkansports. 2013-05-22.)

Instead releasing a normal MV (which was censored due to references of girls suffering), an alternative dance shot MV was released.

== Track listing ==
The first two songs on the CD and their off-vocal versions are the same for all editions. The first 3 music videos on the DVD are the same for both Type-A and Type-B.

=== Type-A ===
CD
No.	Title	Artist(s)	Length
1.	"Manatsu no Sounds Good!" (真夏のSounds good !)		4:35
2.	"Mitsu no Namida" (3つの涙 "Three Types of Tears")	Special Girls	4:30
3.	"Chōdai, Darling!" (ちょうだい、ダーリン!, Chōdai, Dārin!)	AKB48 × Putcho Girls	4:41
4.	"Manatsu no Sounds Good!" (off vocal ver.)		4:35
5.	"Mitsu no Namida" (off vocal ver.)		4:30
6.	"Chōdai, Darling!" (off vocal ver.)		4:39

DVD
No.	Title	Length
1.	"Manatsu no Sounds Good!" (Music Video)
2.	"Manatsu no Sounds Good!" (Music Video -Dance ver.-)
3.	"Mitsu no Namida" (Music Video)
4.	"Chōdai, Darling!" (Music Video)
5.	"AKB48 27th Single Senbatsu Sōsenkyo Shutsuba Member Profile Eizō (Type-A)" (AKB48 27thシングル 選抜総選挙 出馬メンバープロフィール映像<Type-A>)

=== Type-B ===
CD
No.	Title	Artist(s)	Length
3.	"Gugutasu no Sora" (ぐぐたすの空)	Gugutasu(Google+) Senbatsu	4:13
6.	"Gugutasu no Sora" (off vocal ver.)		4:12

DVD
No.	Title	Length
4.	"Gugutasu no Sora" (Music Video)
5.	"AKB48 27th Single Senbatsu Sōsenkyo Shutsuba Member Profile Eizō (Type-B)" (AKB48 27thシングル 選抜総選挙 出馬メンバープロフィール映像<Type-B>)

=== Theater Edition ===
CD
No.	Title	Artist(s)	Length
3.	"Kimi no Tame ni Boku wa..." (君のために僕は… "For Your Sake I'll...")	AKB48 Stage Fighters	5:08
6.	"Kimi no Tame ni Boku wa..." (off vocal ver.)		5:06

== Credits and personnel ==
=== "Manatsu no Sounds Good!" ===
The title track featured 36 members, the largest number of participants on an AKB48 single title track since "Everyday, Katyusha", which featured 26 members.

It was the first AKB48 single title track appearance for 15 people: Team 4's Maria Abe, Miori Ichikawa, Anna Iriyama, Haruka Shimazaki, Haruka Shimada, Miyu Takeuchi, Karen Iwata, Rena Katō, Rina Kawaei, and Juri Takahashi, SKE48's Yuria Kizaki, Akane Takayanagi, and Kanon Kimoto, NMB48's Eriko Jō & HKT48's Haruka Kodama.

- Team A: Asuka Kuramochi, Haruna Kojima, Rino Sashihara, Mariko Shinoda, Aki Takajō, Minami Takahashi, Atsuko Maeda
- Team K: Tomomi Itano, Yūko Ōshima, Minami Minegishi, Sae Miyazawa, Yui Yokoyama
- Team B: Tomomi Kasai, Yuki Kashiwagi, Rie Kitahara, Mayu Watanabe
- Team 4: Maria Abe, Miori Ichikawa, Anna Iriyama, Haruka Shimazaki, Haruka Shimada, Miyu Takeuchi, Suzuran Yamauchi, Karen Iwata, Rena Katō, Rina Kawaei, Juri Takahashi
- Team S / AKB48 Team K: Jurina Matsui
- Team S: Yuria Kizaki, Rena Matsui
- Team KII: Akane Takayanagi
- Team E: Kanon Kimoto
- Team N / AKB48 Team B: Miyuki Watanabe
- Team N: Sayaka Yamamoto
- Team M: Eriko Jō
- Team H: Haruka Kodama

=== "Mitsu no Namida" ===
Performed by Special Girls

- Team A: Misaki Iwasa, Aika Ōta, Shizuka Ōya, Chisato Nakata, Sayaka Nakaya, Ami Maeda, Natsumi Matsubara
- Team K: Sayaka Akimoto, Mayumi Uchida, Ayaka Umeda, Ayaka Kikuchi, Tomomi Nakatsuka, Moeno Nitō, Misato Nonaka
- Team B: Kana Kobayashi, Mika Komori, Amina Satō, Sumire Satō, Natsuki Satō, Mariya Suzuki, Rina Chikano, Yuka Masuda, Miho Miyazaki
- Team 4: Mina Ōba, Yūka Tano, Mariko Nakamura, Mariya Nagao
- Kenkyūsei: : Rina Izuta, Miyū Ōmori, Natsuki Kojima, Marina Kobayashi, Erena Saeed Yokota, Yukari Sasaki, Wakana Natori, Rina Hirata, Nana Fujita, Tomu Mutō, Ayaka Morikawa

=== "Chōdai, Darling!" ===
- Team A: Rino Sashihara, Mariko Shinoda, Minami Takahashi, Atsuko Maeda
- Team K: Tomomi Itano, Yūko Ōshima
- Team B: Kashiwagi Yuki, Mayu Watanabe
- Team 4: Rena Katō, Haruka Shimazaki

=== "Gugutasu no Sora" ===
Center: Haruka Ishida

- Team A: Haruka Katayama, Asuka Kuramochi, Aki Takajō, Haruka Nakagawa
- Team K: Miku Tanabe, Reina Fujie, Sakiko Matsui, Yui Yokoyama
- Team B: Haruka Ishida, Rie Kitahara, Shihori Suzuki
- Team 4: Shiori Nakamata
- SKE48 Team S: Rena Matsui
- SKE48 Kenkyūsei: Kaori Matsumura
- NMB48 Team N: Yūki Yamaguchi, Sayaka Yamamoto

=== "Kimi no Tame ni Boku wa..." ===
Center: Yūko Ōshima

- Team A: Misaki Iwasa
- Team K: Yūko Ōshima, Sae Miyazawa, Yui Yokoyama
- Team B: Yuki Kashiwagi, Rie Kitahara, Mayu Watanabe
- Team 4: Mariya Nagao

== Charts and certifications ==
=== Oricon charts ===
Release	Oricon Singles Chart	Peak position	Debut sales (copies)
May 23, 2012	Daily Chart	1	1,170,554
May 23, 2012	Weekly Chart	1	1,616,795
May 23, 2012	Monthly Chart	1	1,745,399
May 23, 2012	Yearly Chart	1	1,820,056

=== Billboard charts ===
Singles Chart	Peak position
Japan Hot 100	1
Japan Hot 100 for 2012	1

=== Certifications ===
Region	Certification	Certified units/sales
Japan (RIAJ)	2× Million	2,000,000^{^}
^{^} Shipments figures based on certification alone.

== Accolades ==
Year	Ceremony	Award	Result
2012	Billboard Japan Music Awards	Hot 100 of the Year	Won
2012	Billboard Japan Music Awards	Hot 100 Single Sales of the Year	Won
2012	54th Japan Record Awards	Grand Prix	Won
2012	54th Japan Record Awards	Excellent Work Award	Won
2012	54th Japan Record Awards	Lyricist Award	Won
2013	Japan Gold Disc Awards	Single of the Year	Won

== JKT48 version ==
"Manatsu no Sounds Good! - Musim Panas Sounds Good!"

Single by JKT48
- B-side: BINGO!; Kimi to Boku no Kankei – Hubungan Kau Dan Aku; Manatsu no Sounds Good! – Summer Love Sounds Good!
- Released: November 26, 2013
- Genre: Pop
- Label: Hits

JKT48 singles chronology
"Fortune Cookie In Love -Fortune Cookie Yang Mencinta-" (2013)	"Manatsu no Sounds Good! - Musim Panas Sounds Good!" (2013)	"Flying Get" (2014)

"Manatsu no Sounds Good! - Musim Panas Sounds Good!" is the fourth released single from the Indonesian idol girl group JKT48. It was released on November 26, 2013.

=== Promotion and release ===
The AKB48 sister group JKT48 announced the release of "Manatsu no Sounds Good! - Musim Panas Sounds Good!", an Indonesian version of "Manatsu no Sounds Good!", as its fourth single for November 26, 2013.

=== Track listing ===
The single has two editions: Regular Version (CD+DVD) and Theater Version (CD only)

==== Regular Version ====
CD
No.	Title	Length
1.	"Manatsu no Sounds Good! - Musim Panas Sounds Good!"
2.	"BINGO!"
3.	"Kimi to Boku no Kankei – Hubungan Kau Dan Aku" ("Relationship of You and Me")
4.	"Manatsu no Sounds Good! – Summer Love Sounds Good!" (English Ver.)

DVD
No.	Title	Length
1.	"Manatsu no Sounds Good! - Musim Panas Sounds Good! Music Video"
2.	"Manatsu no Sounds Good! - Musim Panas Sounds Good! Music Video Behind the Scenes"

Bonus

- Team J Special Photo
- Team J & Team KIII Photo Group [Member Random]

==== Theater Version ====
CD
No.	Title	Writer(s)	Length
1.	"Manatsu no Sounds Good! - Musim Panas Sounds Good!"	Yasushi Akimoto
2.	"BINGO!"
3.	"Kimi to Boku no Kankei – Hubungan Kau Dan Aku" ("Relationship of You and Me")

Bonus

- Trump Card
- Handshake Event Ticket

== SNH48 version ==
The SNH48 version of this track entitled "盛夏好声音" was released in Summer 2015, and its music video was filmed in March 2015 for 10 days at somewhere in Saipan, United States.

== Notes ==
Preceded by "Flying Get" (AKB48)	Japan Record Award Grand Prix; 2012	Succeeded by "Exile Pride (Konna Sekai o Ai Suru Tame)" (Exile)
