= AKB0048 =

Japanese anime television series

- Official AKB0048 Blu-Ray cover released by Sentai Filmworks
- Genre: Comedy, music, science fiction
- Created by: Shōji Kawamori; Satelight
- Anime television series
- Directed by: Shōji Kawamori (Chief); Yoshimasa Hiraike
- Produced by: Kenjirō Kawahito; Gō Shukuri
- Written by: Mari Okada
- Music by: Hiroshi Takaki; Slavek Kowalewski
- Studio: Satelight
- Licensed by: AUS: Hanabee; NA: Sentai Filmworks
- Original network: tvk, GTV, TVS, SUN, HTV, TBC, GYT, HTB, MTV, Chiba TV, KBS, IBC, FTV, TVQ, Tokyo MX, BS11, NOTTV one
- English network: Anime Network
- Original run: April 29, 2012 – July 22, 2012
- Episodes: 13
- Anime television series

AKB0048: Next Stage
- Directed by: Shōji Kawamori (Chief); Yoshimasa Hiraike
- Produced by: Kenjirō Kawahito; Gō Shukuri
- Written by: Mari Okada; Toshizo Nemoto; Tatsuto Higuchi
- Music by: Hiroshi Takaki; Slavek Kowalewski
- Studio: Satelight
- Licensed by: AUS: Hanabee; NA: Sentai Filmworks
- Original network: tvk, HTB, TBC, FTV, GYT, GTV, TVS, Chiba TV, Tokyo MX, MTV, SUN, KBS, HTV, TVQ, NOTTV one, Anime Network
- Original run: January 5, 2013 – March 30, 2013
- Episodes: 13

AKB0048 (stylized as AKB∞48) is a 2012 Japanese science fiction musical comedy anime television series based on the idol group AKB48. The anime is produced by Satelight, with Shōji Kawamori as chief director. The first season aired in Japan between April and July 2012 whilst the second season aired between January and March 2013.

== Plot ==
At the start of the 21st century, an interplanetary war broke out. Earth's ecosystem was severely damaged, and humanity was forced to flee the planet, thus beginning a new history with the Star Calendar starting from the year 0000. In several planets of this new society led by a totalitarian government, the Deep Galactic Trade Organization [DGTO], things that "disturb the heart" like music and art are forbidden. The legendary idol group AKB48 is later resurrected as the interplanetary troupe AKB0048, made up of girls who carry on the title and spirit of the original members. Since the government sees the existence of the idol group as illegal, the idol group cannot hold their concerts officially. AKB0048 also changed their concept from "idols you can meet" to "idols who see fans". Held as heroines by some and labeled as terrorists by others, they take up arms to bring their music to their fans wherever they are. The story follows a group of young hopefuls as they train to become the next generation of AKB0048.

=== First stage ===
Four years prior to the story, Chieri Sono, while visiting Lancaster with her father, invites Nagisa Motomiya, Orine Aida and Yuuka Ichijo to watch AKB0048's dangerous performance at the planet's mining site as they battle the DES soldiers which attracts and inspires them to join the idol group. Four years later, Star Calendar Year 0048, Nagisa, Orine and Yuuka pass the idol group's first found audition and thus embark on a journey to Akibastar, the homeland of AKB0048 despite Nagisa's father's disapproval of joining the idol group. Meanwhile, Chieri escapes her father who does not approve of her in the same way as Nagisa's father and joins Nagisa, Orine and Yuuka. Also joining are Makoto Yokomizo, the timid girl, Suzuko Kanzaki, a bespectacled girl and Sonata Shinonome, an energetic young girl. All of them pass the second round audition conducted by Tsubasa Katagiri, the manager of AKB0048 and are chosen as the 77th generation trainees.

Arriving at Akibastar, the chosen 77th generation trainees settle down. Joining them are 75th generation trainees, Kanata Shinonome who is Sonata's sister and Mimori Kishida who is Kanata's teammate. Kanata's relationship with her sister is hostile at first because she does not want the latter to risk her life, but soon she comes to accept her as part of the idol group. And so, the trainees undergo a life of concert performance training, singing and dancing, although sometimes they have a monthly day off. All the choreographies are planned by Mr. Ushiyama, a cross dressing man. Inside AKB0048, the trainees come into close relationships with successors Minami Takahashi the 5th (Shiori Arisawa), Yuuko Ooshima the 9th (Hikari Kimishima), Mayu Watanabe Type 3, Sayaka Akimoto the 10th (Akira Igarashi), Yuki Kashiwagi the 6th (Ayako Kuroki), Haruna Kojima the 8th (Chiharu Sakuragi) and Sae Miyazawa the 10th (Youko Asamiya) as they train and perform concerts together and meet fans at both handshake events and concerts held at entertainment-banned planets. Orine meets her hater, who is hostile to her at first but slowly gives her constructive suggestions to help her improve.

Takamina once begins to self-doubt when the kiraras choose Kanata as the ideal successor of Minami Takahashi. So she loses her form and becomes injured while fighting the DES machine. The group performs at Tundrastar, but Takamina forces herself to perform although being forced to be replaced by Kanata and at the end of the concert catches the succession fever in the process, but has recovered since then. After AKB's meeting, a gravure shoot for all the members, including the understudies is held at Atamistar. Tsubasa meets up with the camerawoman, Mikako Minamino, who is the former successor of Minami Minegishi and a former Center Nova. Minami declares she is against the idea of the Center Nova position being resurrected. When the idol group holds its concert at Lancaster, the DES know about it already and enforces stronger control over Lancaster; the WOTA (hardcore fans) protect the idol group along the way. Nagisa's father is caught by the DGTO authorities at the same time. Nagisa becomes worried about her father and soon loses her voice. The concert is held despite the threats and Nagisa's loss of voice but is interrupted in the middle by a DES attack. AKB suddenly hear Acchan's voice, the last Center Nova and with Acchan's voice the idol group is persuaded to fight on. WOTA rescue Nagisa's father and Nagisa later regains the voice back after she finds confidence in herself. Meanwhile, the Kirara are so impressed by Takamina's determination during the concert that they choose her as Minami Takahashi's rightful successor again. But as the DES attack becomes too intense, the concert ends earlier, and the group is forced to move out of Lancaster, heading to their next stage.

=== Next stage ===
In the year since the 77th generation trainees (kenkyūsei, 研究生; also understudies) joined AKB0048, the Deep Galactic Trade Organization [DGTO], a totalitarian galactic government and its national armed force, Destroy Entertainment Soldiers [DES] have stepped up their attacks on entertainment. AKB0048 continue their next stage and performs the concert at Atamistar. Manager Tsubasa announces to bring back the general elections and the Center Nova position. The same night after the concert, Chieri, Ayako and Sonata were caught by the DES to be tried in a High Court in Kasumigastar, the DGTO's capital, but are later freed by the rest of AKB0048 with the help of WOTA. The trial itself made Chieri famous throughout the galaxy and receives more work (such as photoshoots). Chieri's father starts developing artificial Kiraras while Tsubasa becomes curious as to how they were able to break into Kasumigastar so easily earlier. The understudies are now thrown into a new competition directly against the successors especially when the general election is approaching.

Soon later, the results of the general elections are announced with Hikari (Yuuko) announced winner of the top 10 list along with other successors in their respective rankings. Also included in the top 10 list were 77th generation trainee Chieri Sono in 6th place and 75th generation trainee Mimori Kishida in 10th place. The elected members are chosen for a concert on Baltistar, a planet completely under the entertainment ban. Meanwhile, the 77th generation trainees are chosen to infiltrate a nearby military base to undercover and investigate reports of people visiting the base and discover a hidden illegal casino there. The girls target the nuclear reactor hidden in the base, shut down the casino and escape with Higashino, the DES guard helped them in the process. Some time later, the Kirara of Succession show the original Atsuko's image, foretelling that someone may succeed her soon. Mikako is brought in as the group's official camerawoman as the group rehearse for a concert. After the rehearsal, Mimori comes down with a succession fever and Nagisa is chosen to stand in for her in the concert after Mimori collapsed during the break.

Mimori recovers from her fever and debut as a successor, inherited the name of Mariko Shinoda the 8th. Mikako unknowingly informs Chieri's father of the three conditions required for initiating the Center Nova phenomenon. Knowing this, the latter orders his company Zodiac, under the DES to go after an element known as Dualium that is hidden in Akibastar by launching a DES Force attack there one day when AKB hold another concert, putting the city into chaos and forcing AKB to struggle against the DES. AKB retreat from Akibastar due to escalating battle. During DGTO's occupation of Akibastar, AKB0048 barely manage to escape the DES in their ship and arrive above a strange planet to be repaired because it sustained the DES attack. The trainees are sent to gather data on the planet they landed on and in the process meet with the creatures there. A new bond of friendship is made as they defend the planet together and defeat the Zodiac machines that came out of the blue to attack the planet for dualium but sacrificing the nature there. Chieri and Nagisa later sneak on board of one of Zodiac's ships, taking them to Sagittariusstar so that Chieri can confront her father face to face. Chieri finally reaches her father and is told to exhibit her singing skills but witnesses her father assassinated by a person unknown in front of her when it just seems as if the former became friendlier towards her again. Chieri was sad and distraught over the death of her father. Nevertheless, she and her teammates show their fighting spirit to reclaim Akibastar. Back in Akibastar, the people there want AKB0048 dead because DES made them feel betrayed. Despite this, Chieri, Nagisa and the others combine their feelings with the nameless emotions across the galaxy and fight back with love and music, getting the DES to withdraw, the people forgave AKB0048 and returned peace to Akibastar with Nagisa promoted as Atsuko Maeda the 14th and Chieri as the new Center Nova.

== Characters ==
The story focuses mainly on a group of girls who are trainees (研究生, kenkyūsei) in AKB0048. In the Japanese dub, they were voiced by actual members from AKB48 and its sister groups, and are grouped as NO NAME to sing the opening and closing credits. The Successors are veteran members who are titled after members of the original AKB48 troupe, but their roles are performed by professional voice actresses. The other characters are also voiced by professional voice actor and actresses. In contrast to the Japanese dub, in the English dub they are all voiced by professional voice actors and actresses of United States.

=== Main characters ===
Poster featuring the Kenkyūsei members (from left to right: Suzuko, Makoto, Sonata, Mimori, Chieri, Kanata, Orine, Nagisa, and Yūka).

Nagisa Motomiya (本宮 凪沙, Motomiya Nagisa)
Voiced by: Karen Iwata (Japanese); Luci Christian (English)
A thirteen-year-old girl who often does not have a lot of confidence, but aspires to be a true AKB0048 idol alongside her friends. She wears a ribbon given to her by her mother, who supported her decision to audition for AKB despite the disapproval of her father, who works with the government's entertainment-banning activities. Initially, Nagisa is concerned about the competitive nature of AKB, but after the New General Election, in which she sees how passionate everyone is about the group, Nagisa declares Chieri as her rival and vows to face her head on. Like Yūko Ōshima, Nagisa aims to become Center Nova. After Yūko disappears, Nagisa reaffirms her desire to be Center Nova, this time to bring Yūko back from the other world. In the final episode of Next Stage also the final episode of the whole AKB0048 series, she is given the successor title Atsuko Maeda the 14th (14代目 前田 敦子, 14 daime Maeda Atsuko).
Chieri Sono (園 智恵理, Sono Chieri)
Voiced by: Mayu Watanabe (Japanese); Emily Neves (English)
The daughter of a corporate CEO who introduces Nagisa and her friends to AKB when they are younger, and four years later runs away from her father to audition for AKB. Initially, Chieri displays a cool and serious personality, but later becomes more outgoing and friendly. She is very dedicated and passionate about AKB, and never hesitates to put herself at risk for the sake of her friends. Chieri is the first understudy to be accompanied by a Kirara, a small creature that glows whenever it detects the presence of idol radiance, though at first only seems to glow when Nagisa is with her, making Chieri feel inferior to Nagisa until the kirara finally glows for her alone in the last episode of the first season. Yūko Ōshima sees Chieri as a rival for the Center Nova position, and after the New General Election in which Chieri ranks 6th, Nagisa considers her a rival as well. She is nicknamed Cherry by her fans, and Haruna Kojima begins to call her that as well. In the last episode of the series, Chieri becomes the new Center Nova.
Orine Aida (藍田 織音, Aida Orine)
Voiced by: Sayaka Nakaya (Japanese); Brittney Karbowski (English)
One of Nagisa's friends who lost her parents at a young age, and worked at a factory to make ends meet before leaving with her friends to join AKB. She loves tinkering with machinery, but has a surprisingly easygoing personality. She yearns to succeed Sashiko, a previous member of AKB.
Yuuka Ichijou (一条 友歌, Ichijō Yūka)
Voiced by: Amina Sato (Japanese); Monica Rial (English)
A twin-tailed fourteen-year-old who is a thinker who makes things clearer, yet is a little impatient too. However, she is friendly, and is very protective of her friends. She is the only AKB0048's character who has love interest.
Suzuko Kanzaki (神埼 鈴子, Kanzaki Suzuko)
Voiced by: Sawako Hata (Japanese); Caitlynn French (English)
A quiet fourteen-year-old girl with glasses who knows a lot about the history of AKB0048. Sonata often calls her "Linda", because 鈴 (Suzu) can also be read as "Rin," and L and R are not distinguished in Japanese. She is intrigued about learning more about AKB's mysterious commanding officer, Sensei Sensei. She is Sonata's supporter and calls her "Sonati". Rather of wanting to be a successor, Suzuko wants to be AKB0048's supporter like Tsubasa.
Sonata Shinonome (東雲 楚方, Shinonome Sonata)
Voiced by: Kumi Yagami (Japanese); Juliet Simmons (English)
A ten-year-old girl who, after failing the first round of auditions for AKB, sneaks aboard the ship heading towards the second round to try again. She is very supportive of her older sister, Kanata. She has a habit of talking in 3rd person, when talking about herself. Sonata begins to call Makoto Buddha (仏像, butsuzou) because of how worried and negative she is. She yearns to succeed Lovetan who is based on AKB48 member Aika Ota. By the beginning of season two, Sonata is eleven-years-old.
Makoto Yokomizo (横溝 真琴, Yokomizo Makoto)
Voiced by: Mao Mita (Japanese); Molly Searcy (English)
A timid and easily scared sixteen-year-old girl, who often worries and thinks negatively. Because of this, Sonata nicknames her Buddha (仏像, butsuzou). However, she can be very brave when she needs to, eventually gaining a Kirara of her own.
Kanata Shinonome (東雲 彼方, Shinonome Kanata)
Voiced by: Haruka Ishida (Japanese); Genevieve Simmons (English)
Sonata's older sister, who is fifteen and pretty hardheaded. She is part of the 75th generation of trainees, who has yet to become a successor. One of her motivations for joining AKB0048 is vengeance for her father who fell at the hands of the DES army. She passionately supports Takamina. It is believed that she was originally intended to succeed Takamina, but was prevented from doing so because of Takamina's determination to still remain as a member of AKB.
Mimori Kishida (岸田 美森, Kishida Mimori)
Voiced by: Sumire Sato (Japanese); Carli Mosier (English)
With her sensual aura (referred to as pheromones) and caring spirit, Mimori is passionate girl who strives for her best and supports her comrades. She is the only other remaining 75th generation trainee besides Kanata. She ranked 10th in the New General Elections, being one of the two trainees who managed to rank along with Chieri. As of episode 20, she has become a successor bearing the name of Mariko Shinoda the 8th (8代目 篠田 麻里子, 8 daime Shinoda Mariko).
Megumi Wanibuchi (鰐淵 恵, Wanibuchi Megumi)
Voiced by: Momoka Kinoshita (Japanese); Meaghan Avocato (English)
A 76th generation who is sometimes resentful of others succeeding. She is friends with Youko, who was soon promoted to be Sae Miyazawa's successor.

=== Successors ===
The Successors are members of AKB0048 whose stage names are based on AKB48 members along with their ordinal numbers.

Yūko Ōshima the 9th (9代目 大島優子, 9 daime Ōshima Yūko) /Yūko (ゆうこ)
Voiced by: Akemi Kanda (Japanese); Tiffany Terrell (English)
Yuko's dream is to become the Center Nova, a position that was abolished following the disappearance of Atsuko Maeda the 13th. She triggers the Center Nova phenomenon during a DES attack on Akibastar but is unable to control the power and disappears soon after. In the final episode she returns through a gate and joins the other members during a concert on Akibastar. She is titled after Yūko Ōshima, and her real name is Hikari Kimishima (君島 光, Kimishima Hikari).
Minami Takahashi the 5th (5代目 高橋 みなみ, 5 daime Takahashi Minami) /Takamina (たかみな)
Voiced by: Ryoko Shiraishi (Japanese); Cynthia Martinez (English)
Minami is the current captain of AKB0048. She contemplates pushing Kanata for succession but is deterred when she finds out that Kanata has already been chosen to succeed her. Knowing that she is the reason for Kanata's inability to succeed, Takamina begins to doubt herself and her abilities. During their travel to a concert with entertainment ban, they are attacked by DES and due to her wavering heart she is hit and barely escapes alive, causing Kanata to cover her place as an understudy. Wanting Kanata to succeed and not wanting to graduate puts her in a position of self doubt. Yuko then sees her at the infirmary and tells her that the only thing that matter is her own dream, helping her recover her determination to keep being the captain and returning to the stage. She later confronts Kanata and reveals to her that she is the reason she cannot become successor. During the New General Elections she placed second, just behind Yuko Oshima the 9th, but ahead of Sayaka Akimoto the 10th. She is titled after Minami Takahashi and her real name is Shiori Arisawa (有沢 栞, Arisawa Shiori).
Sayaka Akimoto the 10th (10代目 秋元 才加, 10 daime Akimoto Sayaka) /Sayaka (さやか)
Voiced by: Ayako Kawasumi (Japanese); Beth Lazarou (English)
A fitness enthusiast who also tries to force the others to be more active than they already are. She is very head-on with things and a very tough member, but still has a heart of gold. During the New General Elections she ranks third, just behind Minami and ahead of Yukirin. She is titled after Sayaka Akimoto and her real name is Akira Igarashi (五十嵐 アキラ, Igarashi Akira).
Tomomi Itano the 11th (11代目 板野 友美, 11 daime Itano Tomomi) /Tomochin (ともちん)
Voiced by: Kana Ueda (Japanese); Allison Sumrall (English)
Just like all of Tomomi Itano's successors, she is a direct descendant and bears a striking resemblance to Tomomi the 1st. Although she ranks third in the early results for the New General Elections, she ends up in eighth place before Sae and after Kojiharu. Her real name is Tomoyo Itano (板野 友世, Itano Tomoyo).
Yuki Kashiwagi the 6th (6代目 柏木 由紀, 6 daime Kashiwagi Yuki) /Yukirin (ゆきりん)
Voiced by: Yui Horie (Japanese); Margaret McDonald (English)
Yuki assumes the role of Captain whenever Tsubasa steps out, and she is also a nurse. During the New General Elections, she finishes fourth before Mayuyu and after Sayaka. She is titled after Yuki Kashiwagi and her real name is Ayako Kuroki (黒木 綾子, Kuroki Ayako).
Haruna Kojima the 8th (8代目 小嶋 陽菜, 8 daime Kojima Haruna) /Kojiharu (こじはる)
Voiced by: Mamiko Noto (Japanese); Nancy Novotny (English)
Haruna comes from the same generation as Yuko. She is very outgoing and tends to get along with almost everyone she meets. Kojiharu is always cheerful and an upbeat person. In the general elections she is chosen 7th before Tomochin and after Chieri. She is titled after Haruna Kojima and her real name is Chiharu Sakuragi (桜木千春, Sakuragi Chiharu).
Sae Miyazawa the 10th (10代目 宮澤 佐江, 10 daime Miyazawa Sae) /Sae (さえ)
Voiced by: Mai Nakahara (Japanese); Shannon Emerick (English)
She came from the 76th generation. As a successor she doesn't have much free time but she tries her best when she can to rekindle her friendship with Megumi. She is often quiet and seen with Sayaka. In the general elections she is 9th before Mimori and after Tomochin. She is titled after Sae Miyazawa and her real name is Youko Asamiya (朝宮 陽子, Asamiya Yōko)
Mayu Watanabe Type 3 (3型目 渡辺麻友, 3 gatame Watanabe Mayu) /Mayuyu (まゆゆ)
Voiced by: Yukari Tamura (Japanese); Hayley Adams (English)
Mayu Watanabe Android MAYUYU code CG-3 (渡辺 麻友 アンドロイド MAYUYU コード CG-3, Watanabe Mayu Andoroido Mayuyu kōdo CG-3) is a gynoid in the series. Not much is known about her, but she is usually seen with Yukirin if she is not off eating. She has a mechanical forearm with a gun installed inside; and part of her uniform skirt is made of ammo for this weapon. In the general elections she is 5th place after Yukirin and before Chieri. She is based on Mayu Watanabe.
Atsuko Maeda the 13th (13代目 前田 敦子, 13 daime Maeda Atsuko) /Acchan (あっちゃん)
Voiced by: Miyuki Sawashiro (Japanese); Sasha Paysinger (English)
A former member of AKB0048 who was in the Center Nova position and disappeared during a concert. Following her disappearance, the Center Nova position was abolished. She is based on Atsuko Maeda.

=== Others ===
Tsubasa Katagiri (カタギリ ツバサ, Katagiri Tsubasa)
Voiced by: Yumi Kakazu (Japanese); Shelley Calene-Black (English)
AKB0048's manager and producer, and the contact between the girls and Sensei Sensei. Formerly titled Mariko Shinoda the 7th, Tsubasa graduates (and thus has diamonds in her eyes) and enters the administration in order to find out what happened to Atsuko.
Sensei Sensei (先聖センセイ) / S-Quadruple (S.クワドラプル, Esu Kuwadorapuru)
Voiced by: Katsumi Watanabe (Japanese); David Wald (Season 1), Christopher Ayres (Season 2) (English)
The mysterious head of AKB0048 who produces all the songs and choreography for the band.
Ushiyama (牛山先生, Ushiyama-sensei)
Voiced by: Daisuke Ono (Japanese); Illich Guardiola (English)
The effeminate choreographer for AKB0048, who is rather strict in her teachings.
Mikako Minamino (南野 美果子, Minamino Mikako)
Voiced by: Sachiko Kojima (Japanese); Allison Keith-Shipp (English)
A former member of AKB0048 with the title Minami Minegishi the 5th, Mikako works as a camerawoman. She is a former Center Nova, however, during her performance with the group, the Kirara went after her as a Center Nova, but she fled the stage before they could absorb her. She later joins forces with Chieri's father, with the intention of recreating the Center Nova Phenomenon for him, as she looks for a way to bring back Acchan and all other Center Novas who disappeared, but regrets about it when it culminates with DES taking over Akibastar. She redeems herself when she risks her life to protect the others from another DES attack. It is said that her piloting skills are second to none in the 00's history.
Chieri's Father (智恵理の父, Chieri no Chichi)
Voiced by: Shō Hayami (Japanese); David Matranga (English)
The president of the Zodiac Corporation and Chieri's father, his company is a supplier of weaponry for DES and did not seem worried when his daughter fled to join 00. He later appears in the second season investigating the relations between Kiraras, the mineral dualium and the Center Nova phenomenon. His desire is for Chieri to become a Center Nova so he may use the Kirara's power to cross time and space. Once he and Chieri meet for the first time after she leaves to join 00, he is assassinated by unknown reasons.
Nagisa's Father (凪沙の父, Nagisa no Chichi)
Voiced by: Tōru Ōkawa (Japanese); Christopher Ayres (English)
Nagisa's Father is one of the minor characters in the AKB0048 anime series. He is the father of Nagisa Motomiya. He proves to be a serious man and hardworking. Placing his work ahead of his family. After he gets a little side work and shows more importance to his family. He is against Nagisa joining 00 and was against entertainment, but later on has more of an understanding of it.
Chef Papa (パパコック, Papa Kokku)
Voiced by: Itaru Yamamoto (Japanese); John Swasey (English)
Chef Papa is a chef who is affiliated with AKB0048. According to Mimori Kishida, his meals are exquisite. Chef Papa is kind, straight forwarded, and he is always happy and ready to serve anyone his food. Chef Papa also keeps in mind of the likes and dislikes of the food of the people he serves.
Nagisa's Mother (凪沙の母, Nagisa no Kaa)
Voiced by: Kikuko Inoue (Japanese); Nancy Novotny (English)
Nagisa's Mother is one of the minor characters in the AKB0048 anime series. She is the mother of Nagisa Motomiya. She is a housewife and cares for her daughter Nagisa very much. In Episode 1, she made a ribbon for Nagisa to wear when she leaves to audition for AKB0048.
Mamoru (護, Mamoru)
Voiced by: Haruka Ishida (Japanese); Greg Ayres (English)
Mamoru is Yuka's friend from Lancaster. He is also friends with Aoi and a WOTA member. At first, he doesn't seem to like idols. Be when Yuka left Lancaster, he decided to do some research on idols. Since then, he has become very fond of idols, especially Suzuko, however, he secretly fonds over Yuka even more. He tells Yuka that he loves the Yuka that's the 00 member, but no longer loves the Yuka that wasn't. Aoi teased him about whether or not he voted only for Suzuko at the General Elections, implying that she suspects or knows that he loves Yuka, and most likely even more than Suzuko.
Aoi Kouenji (高円寺 葵, Kouenji Aoi)
Voiced by: Airi Furukawa (Japanese); Margaret McDonald (English)
Aoi Koenji is Mamoru's friend from Lancaster. She is also a WOTA member. She is always focused on her mission and works hard as a WOTA member. She often scolds or lectures Mamoru when he is late or not focusing on the task at hand. She is also a fan of Yuka Ichijo. She knows that he is a fan of Suzuko, but also suspects or knows that he loves Yuka as well, possibly even more than Suzuko. This is because she teased him about whether or not he was just rooting for Suzuko when he was trying to get the TV to work so they can watch the General Elections.

== Media ==
=== Manga ===
Prior to the anime's release, four manga series based on original concepts began serialisation in Kodansha's Nakayoshi, Bessatsu Friend, Magazine Special and Bessatsu Shonen Magazine publications during December 2011 and January 2012. These manga are titled AKB0048 Episode 0, AKB0048 Heart-Gata Operation (AKB0048 ハート型オペレーション, AKB0048 Hāto-Gata Operēshon), AKB0048 Gaiden: Fly! AKB Zero Zero Girls' School (AKB0048外伝 とびだせ!AKBぜろぜろ女学園, AKB0048 Gaiden Tobidase! AKB Zero Zero Jogakuen) and AKB0048: The Most Serious Guy in the Universe (AKB0048 宇宙で一番ガチなヤツ!, AKB0048 Uchū de Ichiban Gachi na Yatsu!).

=== Anime ===
The anime by Satelight aired its first season in Japan between April 29, 2012, and July 22, 2012. The series began release on Blu-ray Disc and DVD from June 27, 2012, with a Director's Cut of the first episode included in the first volume. The opening theme is "About a Hope" (希望について, Kibō ni Tsuite) by No Name (Mayu Watanabe, Sumire Satō, Amina Satō, Sayaka Nakaya, Sawako Hata, Mao Mita, Karen Iwata, Kumi Yagami, & Haruka Ishida) while the ending theme is "Dreams Are Forever Reborn" (夢は何度も生まれ変わる, Yume wa Nando mo Umarekawaru) by No Name. The second season aired between January 5, 2013, and March 30, 2013, and was simulcast by Crunchyroll. The opening theme is "The Voice with no master" (主なきその声, Aruji naki sono Koe) by No Name whilst the ending theme is "I Dedicate These Tears to You" (この涙を君に捧ぐ, Kono Namida o Kimi ni Sasagu) Sentai Filmworks have licensed the series in North America. Section23 Films released the first season on DVD and Blu-ray on September 3, 2013 and the Second Season on February 4, 2014.

Chris Beveridge describes the TV series first season like "Footloose meets American Idol meets The Facts of Life.".

==== No Name discography ====
Single	Information	Peak position
"Kibō ni Tsuite" (希望について)	Released: August 1, 2012; Label: Star Child / King Records; Catalog No.: KICM-1410, 1411, 91410, 91411; Format: CD, CD+DVD	3
"Kono Namida wo Kimi ni Sasagu" (この涙を君に捧ぐ)	Released: April 10, 2013; Label: You, Be Cool! / King Records; Catalog No.: KIZM-201, 203; KICM-1443, 1444; Format: CD, CD+DVD	2

=== Video game ===
A collectible card game, AKB0048 ARcarddass, was released in late 2012 for iOS and Android devices, utilising augmented reality to scan special AR Carddass cards. This game is no longer in service as of 2015.

== Reception ==
Writing in the third edition of The Anime Encyclopedia (2015), Jonathan Clements and Helen McCarthy compared AKB0048 to Shōji Kawamori's earlier Macross, considering it inferior but nonetheless entertaining despite being a "shameless promotional tool" for AKB48. They praised Kawamori and Mari Okada for exploring the darker aspects of the Japanese idol industry, including the manipulation of performers and fans, the humiliation of aspiring idols, demanding working conditions and enforced conformity. They compared this critical approach within an ostensibly commercial production to Yoshiyuki Tomino's work on Gundam. However, they criticized the underdeveloped antagonists, Okada's tendency to introduce convoluted plot developments without adequately resolving them, and the interruption of dramatic moments with comedy. Despite these shortcomings, they found it difficult not to surrender to the "sweet, silly charm of it all".

== See also ==
- 22/7 (TV series), an anime television series created for another Yasushi Akimoto idol franchise, 22/7
