= Haruka Ishida =

Japanese actress, voice actress (born 1993)

- 石田 晴香
- Born: December 2, 1993 (age 32); Saitama Prefecture, Japan
- Occupations: Actress; voice actress; tarento
- Years active: 2008–present
- Agent: Horipro
- Musical career
- Genres: J-Pop
- Instrument: Vocals
- Label: King

Haruka Ishida (石田 晴香, Ishida Haruka; born December 2, 1993 in Saitama Prefecture) is a Japanese actress, voice actress and a former member of the Japanese idol girl group AKB48. She has been a co-host on the variety show Dream Creator on TV Tokyo. and has voiced on a handful of anime shows, including Nobunaga the Fool, where she voiced Bianchi Țepeş.

== Career ==
In the 2010 AKB48 general election, Haruka Ishida placed 27th with 3,235 votes. In the first AKB48 rock-paper-scissors tournament, which took place in September 2010, she placed second overall, and as a result, she landed her first appearance on an A-side of an AKB48 single.

In December 2011, Haruka Ishida auditioned for the science-fiction anime series AKB0048. Among the 200 participants, she was selected to be among the main cast of nine, with the role of Kanata Shinonome. In addition to singing the insert songs in the anime, she sang on the theme song as the group "NO NAME" releasing it as a single. She was a center performer of the B-side song "Gugutasu no Sora" which was on Manatsu no Sounds Good!. At AKB48's 2012 general election she ranked 50th, and as a result, appeared on the B-side single "Show Fight" from the group's 27th single Gingham Check. On July 7, 2012, Haruka Ishida appeared as a guest commentator at the Nico Nico 4th Video Awards.

Haruka was a semi-regular guest in 2011 on the variety show Dream Creator, which was broadcast on TV Tokyo. In mid-2012, she became a co-host on the show.

On March 30, 2016, Ishida left the group to pursue a career as a voice actress. She announced it during a live concert at AKB48 Theater.

== Discography ==
=== Singles ===
==== With AKB48 ====
===== A sides =====
- "Chance no Junban"

===== B sides =====
- "River"
  - "Kimi no Koto ga Suki Dakara" - Under Girls
- "Ponytail to Chouchou"
  - "Boku no Yell" - Theater Girls
- "Heavy Rotation"
  - "Namida no Seesaw Game" - Under Girls
  - "Yasai Sisters" - Yasai Sisters
- "Beginner"
  - "Boku Dake no Value" - Under Girls
- "Chance no Junban"
  - "Love Jump" - Team B
- "Sakura no Ki ni Narō"
  - "Gūzen no Jūjiro" - Under Girls
- "Dareka no Tame ni (What Can I Do For Someone?)"
- "Everyday, Katyusha"
  - "Hito no Chikara" - Under Girls
- "Kaze wa Fuiteiru"
  - "Kimi no Senaka" - Under Girls
- "Ue kara Mariko"
  - "Yobisute Fantasy" - Team B
- "Give Me Five!"
  - "Yungu ya Furoito no Baai" - Special Girls C
- "Manatsu no Sounds Good!"
  - "Gugutasu no Sora"
- "Gingham Check"
  - "Show Fight!" - Future Girls
- "Uza"
  - "Seigi no Mikata ja Nai Hero"

==== With No Name ====
- "Kibō ni Tsuite" (August 1, 2012)
- "Kono Namida wo Kimi ni Sasagu" (April 10, 2013)

== Appearances ==
=== TV dramas ===
- Majisuka Gakuen 2 (Final episode, July 1, 2011, TV Tokyo) - Rena
- Kankyō Chōjin Ecogainder|Kankyō Chōjin Ecogainder OX (January 13, 2012 — present, Kids Station)
- Majisuka Gakuen 3 (Episode 8, September 7, 2012, TV Tokyo)

=== Anime ===
- Poyopoyo Kansatsu Nikki (January 8, 2012, TV Tokyo)
- AKB0048 as Kanata Shinonome (April 29 — July 22, 2012)
- AKB0048 Next Stage as Kanata Shinonome (January 5, 2013 - March 30, 2013)
- Nobunaga the Fool as Bianchi (2014)
- W Oh NEW! Panpaka Pants as Haruka (2015)
- Action Heroine Cheer Fruits as Genki Aoyama (eps. 4 - ), Yūki Aoyama (eps. 2 - ) (2017)
- Nana Maru San Batsu as Hosaka (2017)

==== OVA ====
- Nazotoki-hime wa Meitantei|Nazotoki-hime wa Meitantei: Kaizoku no Takara to Komori-uta (August 3, 2012)

==== Video games ====
- Danganronpa V3: Killing Harmony as Miu Iruma (2017)

=== TV variety shows ===
- AKB 0ji 59fun! (AKB0じ59ふん!) (August 25 — September 22, 2008, NTV)
- AKBingo! (July 18, 2012 — present, TV Tokyo)
- Shūkan AKB (週刊AKB) (March 16, 2012 — present, TV Tokyo)
- Ariyoshi AKB Kyōwakoku (有吉AKB共和国) (July 1, 2011 — March 28, 2016, TBS)
- Naruhodo! High School (なるほど!ハイスクール) (NTV)
- AKB48 Conto "Bimyō" (AKB48コント「びみょ〜」) (October 6, 2011 — February 16, 2012, Hikari TV)
- AKB48 no Anta, Dare? (AKB48のあんた、誰?) (NOTTV)
