= Karen Iwata =

Japanese singer (born 1998)

- 岩田 華怜
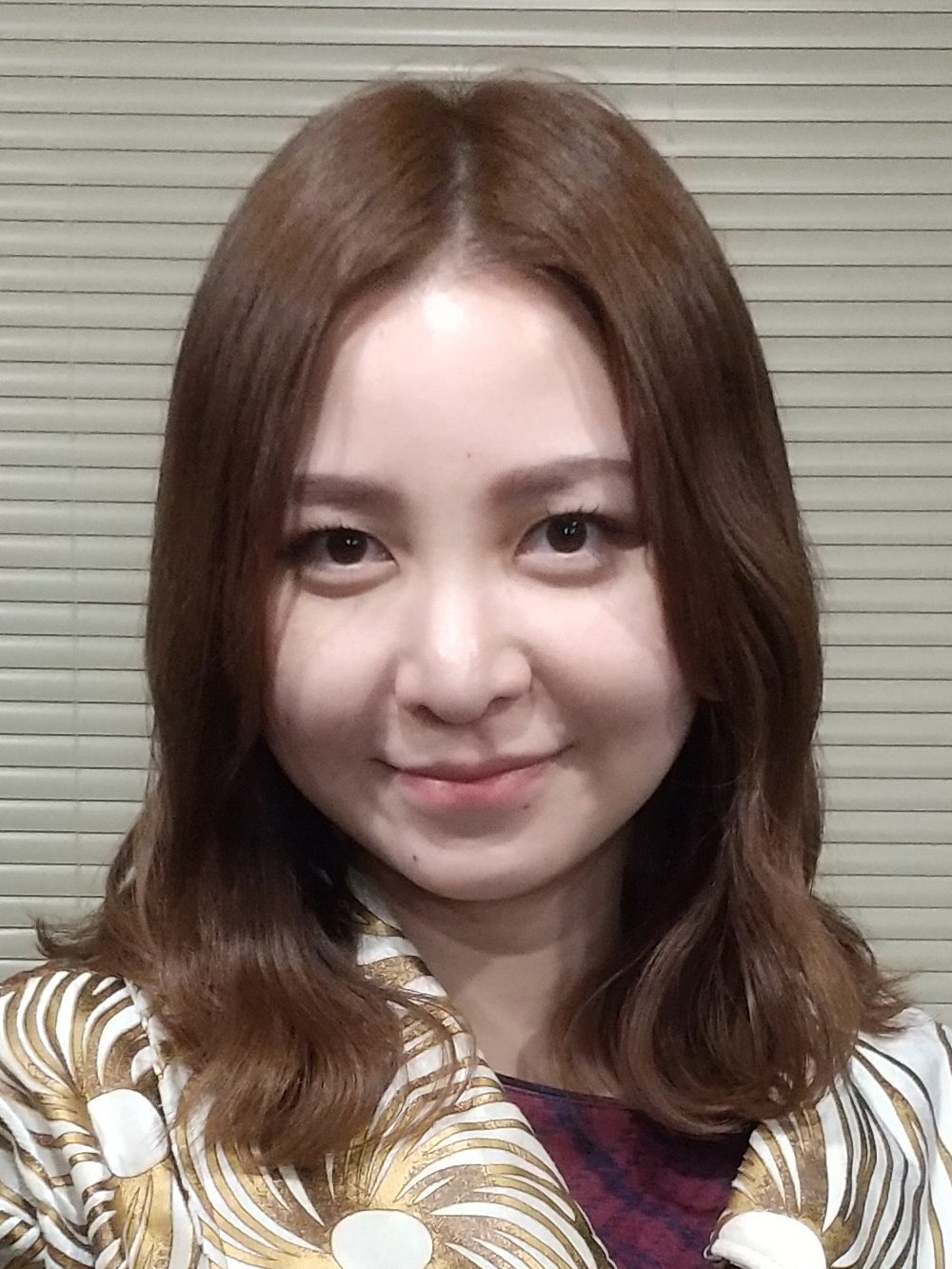
- Iwata at Tokyo, 2024
- Born: May 13, 1998 (age 28); Miyagi Prefecture, Japan
- Education: Nihon University
- Occupations: Actress; Photographer; Singer
- Years active: 1998–present
- Musical career
- Genre: J-pop
- Instrument: Vocals
- Years active: 2011–present
- Formerly of: AKB48 (Team A)
- Website: Official website

Karen Iwata (岩田 華怜, Iwata Karen; born May 13, 1998, in Sendai, Miyagi Prefecture) is an actress and former member of the Japanese idol girl group AKB48 under Team A.

== Biography ==
Iwata was born on May 13, 1998, in Sendai, Miyagi Prefecture. Her mother is Miwa Sugawara, who works as a TV personality in Sendai. As a child, Iwata and her mother appeared in local information programs together, and musicals. Iwata has made appearances in commercials as early as 6 months of age. She auditioned for AKB48, but the Tōhoku earthquake struck just before the final screening and she was affected by the disaster, so she considered withdrawing from the audition. However, the auditions were postponed, so Iwata continued to participate and was selected to join the group as a 12th kenkyusei (trainee) in April 2011.

In December 2011, Iwata auditioned for a role in the TV animated series AKB0048 and was selected to play the main character, Nagisa Motomiya. As part of the anime project, she sang with eight other AKB48 members in the subunit No Name on the show's theme songs. In March 2012, during the Saitama Super Arena concert, Iwata was one of the trainee members who were promoted to full AKB48 members in the new Team 4. She also participated on her first A-side, on the AKB48 single Manatsu no Sounds Good!. In July 2012, Iwata was selected to host a TV program on NHK as part of a series to support the areas affected by the 2011 Tōhoku earthquake and tsunami, which included Sendai. She mentioned that she had lived in a shelter for a while before auditioning for AKB48. On August 24, 2012, AKB48 had a major restructuring, in which Team 4 was dissolved, and Iwata was moved to Team A. On January 5, 2016, Iwata announced she would be leaving the group. AKB48 held her graduation events for Iwata in March 2016.

Just before graduating from AKB48, she moved to the Japanese major talent agency Horipro. She has appeared in numerous stage productions, musicals, films and TV dramas, as well as appearing in concerts organised by Horipro, performing songs and dances from her AKB48 days. In June 2021, she appeared in a concert to celebrate the 10th anniversary of the 12th generation of AKB48, her first appearance in five years at an AKB48 theatre. She played the role of Delphi Diggory in Harry Potter and the Cursed Child in Tokyo from June 2022 to May 2023.

She appeared as the lead actress in The Last Passenger, a film about the Tōhoku earthquake, for which she won the Best Actress Award at the Global Nonviolent Film Festival (2023). This was her first personal award in the field of acting.

Originally, she wanted to be an actress and dreamed of performing in musicals, especially on Broadway. After appearing on the Harry Potter stage, she began to study English again, and in 2024 she obtained a United States O-1B Visa and began her studies in New York City in June. In order to prepare for her studies in the U.S., she left Horipro at the end of June 2023, after which she is working on a freelance basis.

Iwata attended the Faculty of Arts at Nihon University and graduated from Department of Photography in March 2023.

== Discography ==
=== Singles ===
==== With AKB48 ====
===== A sides =====
- "Manatsu no Sounds Good!"

===== B sides =====
- "Kaze wa Fuiteiru"
  - "Tsubomitachi" – Team 4+Kenkyūsei
- "Give Me Five!"
  - "New Ship" – Special Girls A
- "Gingham Check"
  - "Ano Hi no Fūrin" – Waiting Girls
- "Uza"
  - "Tsugi no Season" – Under Girls
  - "Kodoku na Hoshizora" – Team A
- "So Long!"
  - "Ruby" – Team A
- "Sayonara Crawl"
  - "Bara no Kajitsu" – Under Girls
  - "Ikiru Koto" – Team A
- "Heart Electric"
  - "Kaisoku to Doutai Shiryoku" – Under Girls
  - "Kiss made Countdown" – Team A
- "Mae shika Mukanee"
  - "Konjo" – Talking Chimpanzees
- "Labrador Retriever"
  - "Kimi wa Kimagure" – Team A
- "Kokoro no Placard"
  - "Sailor Zombie" – Milk Planet
- "Kibōteki Refrain"
  - "Juujun na Slave" – Team A
  - "Utaitai" – Katareagumi (Cattleya Group)
- "Kuchibiru ni Be My Baby"
  - "Yasashii Place" – Team A
- "Kimi wa Melody"
  - "M.T. ni Sasagu" – Team A

==== With Hana wa Saku Project ====
Title	Release date	Chart position	Notes
Title	Release date	Oricon Weekly Singles Chart	Notes
"Hana wa Saku" (花は咲く)	May 23, 2012	17	Single by Hana wa Saku Project; Participated in the main single and "Hana wa Saku Iwata Karen ver."

==== With No Name ====
- "Kibō ni Tsuite" (August 1, 2012)
- "Kono Namida o Kimi ni Sasagu" (April 10, 2013)

==== With Wake Up, Girls! Project ====
Title	Release date	Chart position	Notes
Title	Release date	Oricon Weekly Singles Chart	Notes
"Wake Up, Best!3"	March 28, 2018	27	as Megumi Yoshikawa, member of I-1 club Participated in "knock out".

== Appearances ==
=== TV dramas ===
- Majisuka Gakuen 2 (Final episode, July 1, 2011, TV Tokyo), as Rena
- Majisuka Gakuen 3 (Episode 8, September 7, 2012, TV Tokyo)
- Sailor Zombie (2014, TV Tokyo), as Milk Planet, Karen
- Majisuka Gakuen 4 (First episode, January 19, 2015, Nippon TV), as Masamune
- Majisuka Gakuen 5 (Episode Nine, October 6, 2015, Hulu), as Anison

=== Films ===
- Solomon's Perjury (2015), as Saori Kawara
- The Magnificent Nine (2016), as Kayo
- Saki Achiga-hen episode of Side-A (2018), as Seiko Matano
- The Last Passenger (2023), as Mizuki
- Eternal New Mornings (2023), as Shoko Miyamoto

=== Anime ===
- AKB0048 (April 29, 2012 – July 22, 2012), as Nagisa Motomiya
- AKB0048 Next Stage (January 5, 2013 – March 30, 2013), as Nagisa Motomiya/Atsuko Maeda the 14th

=== TV variety shows ===
- Tosugeki! Namaiki TV (突撃!ナマイキTV) (2003 – 2010, Higashinippon Broadcasting)
- Ariyoshi AKB Kyōwakoku (有吉AKB共和国) (July 1, 2011 – 2016, TBS)
- Shūkan AKB (週刊AKB) (March 16, 2012 – 2016, TV Tokyo)
- AKBingo! (July 18, 2012 – 2016, Nippon TV)
- Ashita e 1 min "Karen no Fukkō Calendar" (August 28, 2012 – March 7, 2016, NHK General TV) — host
- Zenryoku Ōen! NHK-hai Fugure 2012: Ginban Athlete-tachi (November 11–15, 2012, NHK General TV, NHK BS1) — host

=== Stages ===
- Broadway Musical Footloose (September 15 – October 12, 2014), as Wendy Joe
- Danganronpa: Trigger Happy Havoc (June 16 – July 16, 2016), as Aoi Asahina
- Wake Up, Girls! Record of Green Leaves (Aoba no Kiroku) (January 19 – 22, 2017), as Megumi Yoshikawa
- Silent Möbius (March 29 – April 2, 2017), as Katsumi Liqueur
- CEDAR Produce vol.3 The Robbers (May 31 – June 3, 2018), as Amalia von Edelreich
- Kami no Kiba: Jinga (January 5, 2019), Guest appearance
- CEDAR Produce vol.5 Demons (January 23 – 29, 2020), as Lizaveta Nikolaevna Tushina (Liza)
- Brighton Beach Memoirs (September 18 – October 13, 2021), as Laurie Morton
- Harry Potter and the Cursed Child (June 16, 2022 – May 28, 2023), as Delphi Diggory
