= Yuko Oshima =

Japanese actress and singer (born 1988)

- 大島 優子
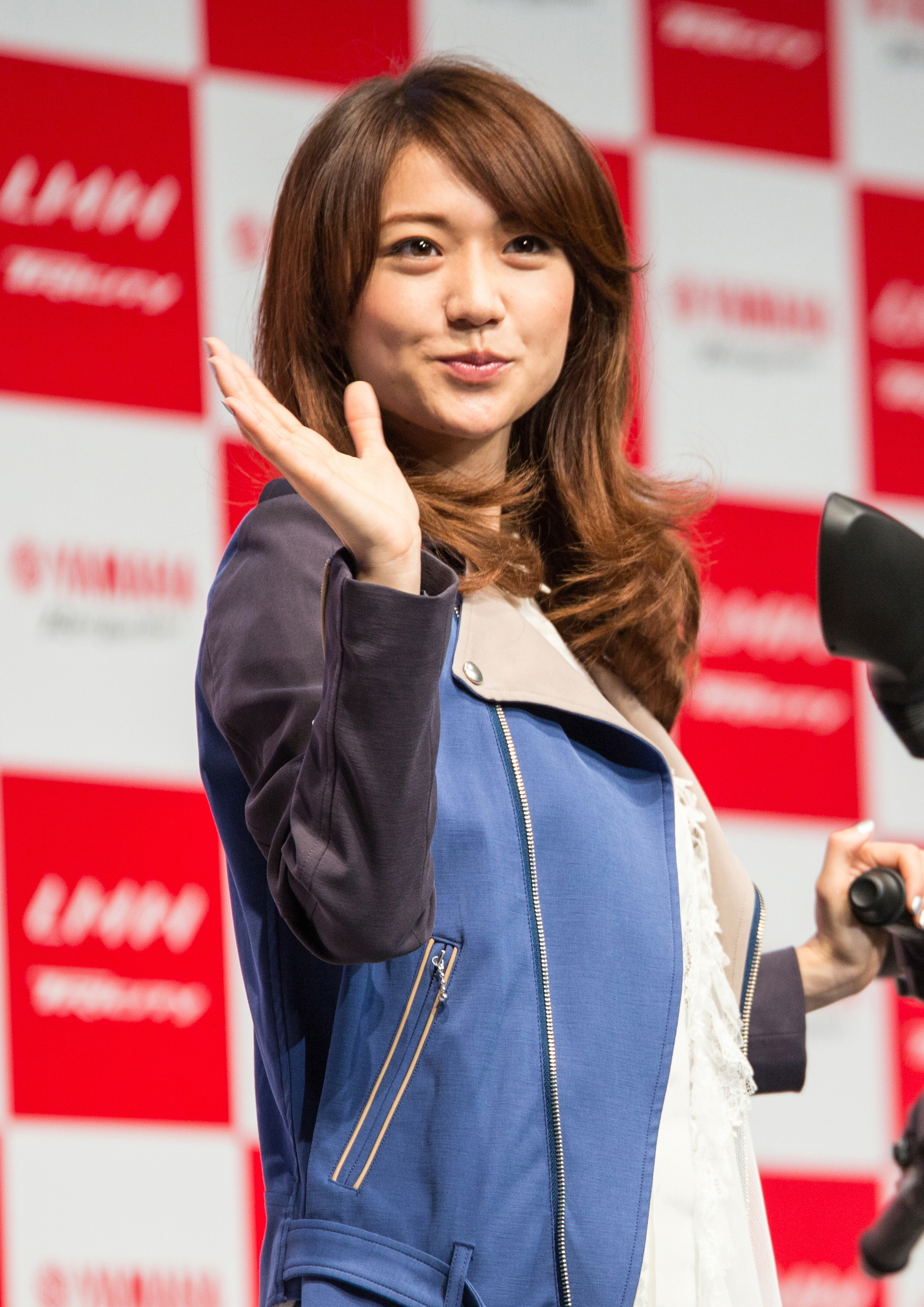
- Oshima at the Yamaha Tricity launching event in 2014
- Born: October 17, 1988 (age 37); Mibu, Tochigi, Japan
- Occupations: Actress; singer
- Years active: 1996–present
- Spouse: Kento Hayashi (m. 2021)
- Children: 2
- Musical career
- Genre: J-pop
- Instruments: Vocals; bass guitar
- Years active: 2006–2014
- Labels: King (AKB48); Nippon Columbia (Not Yet)
- Website: Official website

Yuko Oshima (大島 優子, Ōshima Yūko; born October 17, 1988) is a Japanese actress and former member of idol girl group AKB48, of which she was the captain of Team K. She was also a member of the AKB48 subunit Not Yet. In addition to the singles that involved the rock-paper-scissors tournaments, she sang on the title tracks for all of AKB48's singles since Aitakatta in October 2006. She placed among the top two of the annual AKB48 general elections from 2009 to 2013. Oshima is currently represented with Ohta Production.

== Biography ==
Oshima was born in Yokohama, and was raised in Mibu, Tochigi Prefecture. Her mother is from Hokkaido. Oshima is 3/4 Japanese and 1/4 American. Her parents divorced 6 months after her family moved to Mibu. Oshima lived with her father while she only saw her mother once after the divorce. In 1996, she signed as a child actor with Central Kodomo Gekidan. In 2005, she began working as a junior idol in a short-lived idol project Doll's Vox, which was produced by The Alfee vocalist Toshihiko Takamizawa. In 2006, at the AKB48's second audition to form Team K, she was selected out of a pool of 12,000 applicants to join the team. In April, she began working full-time with the group, which debuted with the single, "Aitakatta", in October 2006.

On August 24, 2012, AKB48 announced a reorganization of the teams, and appointed Oshima to be the captain of Team K.

On December 31, 2013, Oshima announced on Kohaku Uta Gassen that she would be leaving the group. On February 26, 2014, the last single for her as a member of AKB48 and as the center performer of that, "Mae shika Mukanee" was released. She graduated from AKB48 on June 9, 2014, by the performance at the AKB48 theatre.

On July 29, 2021, Oshima married actor and Scarlet co-star Kento Hayashi. She gave birth to their first child on January 5, 2023.

== AKB48 general elections ==
Oshima has placed in the top two in the first five AKB48 general elections. In 2009 she placed second overall, losing only to Atsuko Maeda. In 2010, she received the most votes and became the center performer in the single "Heavy Rotation". In the 2011 general election, she placed second to Maeda once again. In the 2012 general election, she placed first with 108,837 votes and became the center performer in the single "Gingham Check". In the 2013 general election, she was voted second overall with 136,503 votes and lost to Rino Sashihara with 150,570 votes.

== Discography ==
=== Singles with AKB48 ===
Year	No.	Title	Role	Notes
2006	1	"Aitakatta"	A-side	Debut with Team K.
2007	2	"Seifuku ga Jama o Suru"	A-side	
2007	3	"Keibetsu Shiteita Aijō"	A-side	
2007	4	"Bingo!"	A-side	
2007	5	"Boku no Taiyō"	A-side	
2007	6	"Yūhi o Miteiru ka?"	A-side	
2008	7	"Romance, Irane"	A-side	
2008	8	"Sakura no Hanabiratachi 2008"	A-side	
2008	9	"Baby! Baby! Baby!"	A-side	
2008	10	"Ōgoe Diamond"	A-side	
2009	11	"10nen Sakura"	A-side	Also sang on "Sakurairo no Sora no Shita de"
2009	12	"Namida Surprise!"	A-side	
2009	13	"Iiwake Maybe"	A-side	Ranked 2nd in 2009 General Election.
2009	14	"River"	A-side	
2010	15	"Sakura no Shiori"	A-side	Also sang on "Majisuka Rock 'n' Roll".
2010	16	"Ponytail to Shushu"	A-side	Also sang on "Majijo Teppen Blues"
2010	17	"Heavy Rotation"	A-side, Center	Ranked 1st in 2010 General Election. Also sang on "Yasai Sisters" and "Lucky Seven".
2010	18	"Beginner"	A-side	
2010	19	"Chance no Junban"	B-side	Did not sing on title track; lineup was determined by rock-paper-scissors tournament. Sang on "Yoyakushita Christmas"; and "Alive" with Team K.
2011	20	"Sakura no Ki ni Narō"	A-side	
2011	--	"Dareka no Tame ni - What can I do for someone?"	--	charity single
2011	21	"Everyday, Katyusha"	A-side	Also sang on "Korekara Wonderland" and "Yankee Soul".
2011	22	"Flying Get"	A-side	Ranked 2nd in 2011 General Election. Also sang on "Seishun to Kizukanai Mama", "Ice no Kuchizuke", and "Yasai Uranai".
2011	23	"Kaze wa Fuiteiru"	A-side, Center	
2011	24	"Ue kara Mariko"	A-side	Did not sing on title track; lineup was determined by rock-paper-scissors tournament; She sang on "Noël no Yoru"; and on "Zero-sum Taiyō" as Team K.
2012	25	"Give Me Five!"	A-side (Baby Blossom), Selection 6	Played bass in Baby Blossom; She also sang on "Sweet & Bitter" as Selection 6.
2012	26	"Manatsu no Sounds Good!"	A-side, AKB48 Stage Fighters	Also sang on "Choudai, Darling!"; and "Kimi no Tame ni Boku wa..." as AKB48 Stage Fighters
2012	27	"Gingham Check"	A-side, Center	Ranked 1st in 2012 General Election. Also sang on "Yume no Kawa".
2012	28	"Uza"	A-side, Center, New Team K	Also sang on "Scrap & Build" as New Team K.
2012	29	"Eien Pressure"	B-side, OKL48	Did not sing on title track; lineup was determined by rock-paper-scissors tournament. Sang on "Totteoki Christmas"; and "Eien Yori Tsuzuku Yō ni" as part of OKL48.
2013	30	"So Long!"	A-side	Also sang on "Yuuhi Marie" as Team K.
2013	31	"Sayonara Crawl"	A-side, Center	Also sang on "How come?" as Team K. One of four centers for the single.
2013	32	"Koi Suru Fortune Cookie"	A-side	Ranked 2nd in 2013 General Election. Also sang on "Namida no Sei Janai" and "Saigo no Door".
2013	33	"Heart Electric"	A-side	Given an English nickname Lucy. Also sang on "Sasameyuki Regret" as Team K.
2013	34	"Suzukake no Ki no Michi de "Kimi no Hohoemi o Yume ni Miru" to Itte Shimattara Bokutachi no Kankei wa Dō Kawatte Shimau no ka, Bokunari ni Nan-nichi ka Kangaeta Ue de no Yaya Kihazukashii Ketsuron no Yō na Mono"	B-side	Did not sing on title track; lineup was determined by rock-paper-scissors tournament. Sang on "Mosh & Dive" and "Party is over".
2014	35	"Mae shika Mukanee"	A-side, Center	Last Single in AKB48
2014	36	"Labrador Retriever"	B-side	Did not participate in title song. Participated in "Kyō made no Melody" which was also her graduation song.
2016	43	"Kimi wa Melody"	A-side	Marked as the 10th Anniversary Single. Participated as graduated member.

=== Singles with SKE48 ===
Year	No.	Title	Role	Notes
2016	19	"Chicken Line"	B-side	Sang on "Tabi no Tochū". Participated as graduated member.

== Stage units ==
Team K 1st Stage Party ga Hajimaru yo (PARTYが始まるよ)

- "Skirt, Hirari" (スカートひらり)

Team K 2nd Stage Seishun Girls (青春ガールズ)

- "Kinjirareta Futari" (禁じられた二人)
- "Fusidara na Natsu" (ふしだらな夏)

Team K 3rd Stage Nōnai Paradise (脳内パラダイス)

- "Nakinagara Hohoende" (泣きながら微笑んで) (Solo Unit)

Himawarigumi 1st Stage Boku no Taiyō (僕の太陽)

- "Boku to Juliet to Jet Coaster" (僕とジュリエットとジェットコースター)

Himawarigumi 2nd Stage Yume o Shinaseru Wake ni Ikanai (夢を死なせるわけにいかない)

- "Confession"

Team K 4th Stage Saishū Bell ga Naru (最終ベルが鳴る)

- "Gomen ne Jewel" (ごめんねジュエル)

Team K 5th Stage Sakaagari (逆上がり)

- "End Roll"

Team K 6th Stage Reset

- "Kokoro no Hashi no Sofa" (心の端のソファー)

Team K Waiting Stage

- "Glory Days"
- "Higurashi no Koi" (new units)

== Filmography ==
=== Films ===
Year	Title	Role	Notes	Ref.
2009	Teketeke	Kana Ōhashi	Leading role	
2009	Teketeke 2	Kana Ōhashi		
2013	SPEC: Close~Incarnation	white woman		
2013	SPEC: Close~Reincarnation	white woman		
2014	Pale Moon	Keiko Aikawa		
2015	Do It! Anpanman: Miija and the Magic Lamp	Miija		
2020	All the Things We Never Said	Natsumi		
2021	The Great Yokai War: Guardians	Yuki-onna		
2021	Tomorrow's Dinner Table	Yōko		
2021	We Couldn't Become Adults	Megumi Ishida		
2022	To Be Killed by a High School Girl	Satsuki Fukagawa		
2022	Tombi: Father and Son	Yukie		
2022	7 Secretaries: The Movie	Miwa Kazama		
2022	The Three Sisters of Tenmasou Inn	Nozomi		
2023	Nemesis: The Mystery of the Golden Spiral	Kiiko Uehara		
2026	Kyojo: Reunion	Shinobu Kusumoto		

=== Dramas ===
Year	Title	Role	Notes	Ref.
2015	Yamegoku: Helpline Cop	Bakushū Nagamitsu	Leading role	
2016	Here Comes Asa!	Raicho Hiratsuka	Asadora	
2017	Tokyo Tarareba Musume	Koyuki		
2019	Scarlet	Teruko	Asadora	
2020	Kyojo	Shinobu Kusumoto	Miniseries	
2020	7 Secretaries	Miwa Kazama		
2021	Nemesis	Kiiko Uehara		
2021	Reach Beyond the Blue Sky	Itō Kaneko	Taiga drama	
2022	Because We Forget Everything			
2024	Antihero	Rin Shiraki		

=== Japanese dub ===
Year	Title	Role	Notes	Ref.
2012	Brave	Mérida		
2018	Ralph Breaks the Internet	Mérida		
2024	Madame Web	Cassandra Webb/Madame Web (Dakota Johnson)		
2026	Paw Patrol: The Dino Movie	Harper Cutlass		

=== Variety shows ===
- AKBingo!
- Shūkan AKB (週刊AKB)
- AKB48 Nemōsu TV (AKB48ネ申テレビ)
- AKB とＸＸ！ (AKB48とＸＸ！)
- Hoko x Tate
- Naruhodo High School
- AKB48 kousagi (AKB子兎道場)
- AKB48 SHOW!
- Woman On the Planet

== Other media ==
=== Photobooks ===
- [2001.07.10] Charm (with Tajima Honami) ISBN 4883026280
- [2003.10.18] かがやくきもち (Kagayaku Kimochi) ISBN 4821125765
- [2008.12.19] ゆうらりゆうこ (Yuurari Yūko) ISBN 9784812436936
- [2009.10.17] 優子のありえない日常 (Yūko no Arienai Nichijou) ISBN 9784847042089
- [2010.08.25] 君は、誰のもの? (Kimi wa, Dare no Mono?) (aka Oshima Yuko L.A.) ISBN 9784334901752
- [2011.06.17] 優子 (Yūko) ISBN 9784063895735
- [2014.09.18] 脱ぎやがれ! (Nugiyagare! Photographed by Mika Ninagawa) ISBN 9784344026285

=== Magazines ===
- smart, Takarajimasha 1995-, since 2011

=== Radio shows ===
- AKB48 Ashita Made Mō Chotto. (AKB48明日までもうちょっと。)
- AKB48 no All Night Nippon (AKB48のオールナイトニッポン)

== Awards and nominations ==
Year	Award	Category	Nominated work	Result
2011	5th Bridal Jewelry Princess			Won
2011	Blog of the Year 2011	Female Category		Won
2012	23rd Japan Jewelry Best Dresser Award	20s category		Won
2012	6th JAPAN CUTS: The New York Festival of Contemporary Japanese Cinema	Cut Above Award for Outstanding Debut	Ushijima the Loan Shark	Won
2013	36th Japan Academy Prize	Most Popular Actor	Ushijima the Loan Shark	Won
2014	27th Shogakukan DIME Trend Awards	Most Talked About Personality		Won
2014	39th Hochi Film Awards	Best Supporting Actress	Pale Moon	Won
2015	36th Yokohama Film Festival	Best Supporting Actress	Pale Moon	Won
2015	24th Tokyo Sports Film Award	Best Supporting Actress	Pale Moon	Won
2015	69th Mainichi Film Awards	Best Supporting Actress	Pale Moon	Nominated
2015	57th Blue Ribbon Awards	Best Supporting Actress	Pale Moon	Nominated
2015	38th Japan Academy Prize	Outstanding Performance by an Actress in a Supporting Role	Pale Moon	Nominated
2015	85th The Television Drama Academy Award	Best Actress	Yamegoku: Yakuza Yamete Itadakimasu	Won
