= Kaoru Mitsumune =

Japanese actress, artist, model, artist, and performer (born 1993)

- 光宗 薫
- Born: 26 April 1993 (age 33); Ehime Prefecture, Japan
- Occupations: Actress and model
- Years active: 2011–present
- Agent: Flave Entertainment
- Height: 1.68 m (5 ft 6 in)
- Website: flave.co.jp/pages/talent/mitsumune_kaoru/index (in Japanese)

Kaoru Mitsumune (光宗 薫, Mitsumune Kaoru; born April 26, 1993, in Ehime Prefecture) is a Japanese actress, model and a former member of Japanese idol girl group AKB48.

== Career ==
Mitsumune was born in Ehime Prefecture in 1993. As her parents moved around for work, she spent time in Chiba, Hiroshima and Kanagawa Prefectures before settling in Osaka for high school. In March 2011, Mitsumune won the Grand Prix at the Kobe Collection Model Audition 2011. In December of the same year, she joined AKB48 as part of the 13th generation trainee members. She made her television drama debut in Ataru aired on TBS in April 2012. On October 24, 2012, she announced that she would leave the group due to her poor physical condition. She played the lead role for the first time in the film Joshi Camera, and it was released on November 24, 2012.

Mitsumune made a comeback to the entertainment industry appearing in the film Gekijōban Ataru The First Love & The Last Kill released on September 14, 2013. In April 2014, it was announced that she belonged to the agency Flave Entertainment, and she resumed her activity in full swing.

== Discography ==
=== Singles with AKB48 ===
Year	No.	Title	Role	Notes
2012	27	"Gingham Check"	Waiting Girls	"Ano Hi no Fūrin"
2012	28	"Uza"	New Team K	"Scrap & Build"

=== Albums with AKB48 ===
1830m

- "Sakuranbo to Kodoku" (Kenkyūsei)
- "Aozora yo Sabishikunai Ka?" (AKB48 + SKE48 + NMB48 + HKT48)

== Stage units ==
Team A 6th Stage "Mokugekisha"

Team K 6th Stage "Reset"

- "Kiseki wa Maniawanai"

Team B 5th Stage "Theater no Megami"

- "Romance Kakurenbo"

AKB48 Kenkyūsei Stage "Reset"

- "Kiseki wa Maniawanai"
- "Ashita no Tame ni Kiss o"

AKB48 Kenkyūsei Stage "Boku no Taiyō"

- "Boku to Juliet to Jet Coaster"

== Appearances ==
=== Movies ===
- Gekijōban Shiritsu Bakaleya Koukou (2012), Sayuri Tokimune
- Joshi Camera (2012), Miki Yoshizawa
- Gekijōban Ataru The First Love & The Last Kill (2013), Yui Ishikawa
- Piece of Cake (2015), Akari Narita(Naomi Shibuya)
- Room Laundering (2018)

=== Television ===
- Shiritsu Bakaleya Koukou (NTV, 2012), Sayuri Tokimune
- Ataru (TBS, 2012), Yui Ishikawa
- Mare (NHK, 2015), Yukari Adachi
- Ushijima the Loan Shark (MBS, 2016), Mayumi Uehara
- Kakusei Hunter Omegahorn (TV Asahi, 2026), Baasaa the Soaring Guide

=== Dubbing ===
- The Blacklist Season 2 Episode 1 (Super! Drama TV, 2015), Rowan Mills

=== Commercials ===
- Asahi Soft Drinks - Wanda Morning Shot (2012)
- Hewlett-Packard Japan (2012)
- Sunstar Group - Sunstar Tonic (2014)

=== Music videos ===
- Shinsei Kamattechan - Jibun Rashiku (2015)

=== Events ===
- Girls Award 2014 S/S, 2014 A/W
- Tokyo Runway 2014 S/S, 2014 A/W, 2015 S/S
- Kobe Collection 2011 Shanghai, 2014 S/S, 2014 A/W, 2016 S/S
- Kansai Collection 2014 S/S, 2016 S/S

== Bibliography ==
=== Magazines ===
- Oggi, Shogakukan 1991-, as a regular model since December 2014 issue

== Awards ==
- Kobe Collection Model Audition (2011): Grand Prix
