= Kibō ni Tsuite =

Single by NO NAME
- Released: 1 August 2012
- Genre: J-pop, anison
- Label: King/Star Child
- Songwriter: Yasushi Akimoto
- Producer: Yasushi Akimoto

NO NAME singles chronology
"Kibō ni Tsuite" (2012)	"Kono Namida o Kimi ni Sasagu" (2013)

Kibō ni Tsuite (希望について) is a 2012 single by No Name. It reached the third place at the Oricon Weekly Singles Chart in the week of 30 July to 5 August 2012. It has sold around 47,000 copies. It is the opening song for the anime television series AKB0048.

== Tracking listing ==
No.	Title	Length
1.	"Kibō ni Tsuite" (希望について)	4:06
2.	"Yume wa Nando mo Umarekawaru" (夢は何度も生まれ変わる)	4:20
3.	"Niji no Ressha" (虹の列車)	3:17
4.	"Kibō ni Tsuite" (off vocal ver.)	4:06
5.	"Yume wa Nando mo Umarekawaru" (off vocal ver.)	4:20
6.	"Niji no Ressha" (off vocal ver.)	3:17
