= Rion Azuma =

Japanese tarento (born 1996)

- 東 李苑
- Born: November 13, 1996 (age 29); Sapporo, Hokkaido, Japan
- Other name: Azumarion
- Occupation: Tarento
- Years active: 2017–present
- Agent: Deep Skill
- Height: 1.60 m (5 ft 3 in)
- Spouse: Hiyo (m. 2023)
- Musical career
- Genres: J-pop
- Instrument: Vocals
- Years active: 2012–2017
- Formerly of: Team Crerekko (2012); SKE48 (2013-2017)
- Website: azumarion-fc.jp

Rion Azuma (東 李苑, Azuma Rion; born 13 November 1996 in Sapporo, Hokkaido Prefecture) is a Japanese tarento. She is a former member of the Japanese idol girl group SKE48 and was a member of Teams E and S.

She is currently affiliated with Deep Skill.

== Career ==
Azuma passed Team Crerekko's (a Hokkaido-based idol group) 4th generation auditions in October 2012, but resigned in December 2012. She later applied for SKE48's 6th generation auditions in January 2013 and passed. Her debut was on February 28, 2013. Her debut stage performance was on March 26, 2013, at SKE48's Kenkyuusei Stage. On April 13, 2013, she was promoted to Team E. This made Azuma the member who spent the shortest period, 18 days, as a trainee member. In February 2014, during the AKB48 Group Shuffle, it was announced she would be transferred to Team S. She first entered SKE48's Senbatsu for the single Mirai to wa?.

Her lightstick colours were pink, black and white.

She graduated from SKE48 on March 31, 2017. She then ended her idol activities, moved back to her hometown of Sapporo and became a local tarento there.

On June 1, 2018, Azuma became affiliated with the Sapporo-based entertainment company CREATIVE OFFICE CUE. She left the agency on September 30, 2022. The day after, she expanded her range of operations to Tokyo.

On February 9, 2023, Azuma announced her move to the Tokyo-based entertainment company Deep Skill. On August 9 of the same year, she announced her marriage to the Hokkaido-born influencer Hiyo.

== Discography ==
=== SKE48 singles ===
| Year | No. | Title | Role | Notes |
|---|---|---|---|---|
| 2013 | 12 | "Utsukushii Inazuma" | B-side | Sang on "Shalala na Calendar" as Team E |
| 2013 | 13 | "Sansei Kawaii!" | B-side | Sang on "Itsunomanika, Yowaimonoijime" |
| 2014 | 14 | "Mirai to wa?" | A-side | Also sang on "Machiawasetai" |
| 2014 | 15 | "Bukiyō Taiyō" | A-side | Also sang on "Houkago Race" and "Tomodachi no Mama de" |
| 2014 | 16 | "12 Gatsu no Kangaroo" | A-side | Also sang on "I love AICHI" as Aichi Toyota Senbatsu; "Kesenai Honō" as Team S. |
| 2015 | 17 | "Coquettish Jūtai Chū" | A-side | Also sang on "DIRTY" as Team S and "Yoru no Kyoukasho". |
| 2015 | 18 | "Mae Nomeri" | A-side | Also sang on "Suteki na Zaiakukan" as Team S. |
| 2016 | 19 | "Chicken Line" | A-side | Also sang on "Kanojo ga Iru" as Team S. |
| 2016 | 20 | "Kin no Ai, Gin no Ai" | A-side | |

=== AKB48 singles ===
| Year | No. | Title | Role | Notes |
|---|---|---|---|---|
| 2013 | 34 | "Suzukake no Ki no Michi de "Kimi no Hohoemi o Yume ni Miru" to Itte Shimattara Bokutachi no Kankei wa Dō Kawatte Shimau no ka, Bokunari ni Nan-nichi ka Kangaeta Ue de no Yaya Kihazukashii Ketsuron no Yō na Mono" | B-side | Sang on "Escape" |
| 2014 | 35 | "Mae Shika Mukanee" | B-side | Sang on "Himitsu no Diary" |
| 2014 | 38 | "Kibouteki Refrain" | B-side | Sang on "Ambulance" |
| 2015 | 39 | "Green Flash" | B-side | Sang on "Sekai ga Naiteru Nara" |
| 2015 | 41 | "Halloween Night" | B-side | Sang on "Kimi ni Wedding Dress o..." as Future Girls |
| 2016 | 43 | "Kimi wa Melody" | B-side | Sang on "Gonna Jump" as SKE48 |
| 2016 | 46 | "High Tension" | B-side | Sang on "Mata Anata no Koto o Kangaeteta" as Team Vocal |

== Appearances ==
=== Stage units ===
SKE48 Kenkyuusei Stage "Aitakatta" (会いたかった)

1. ""Namida no Shounan" (涙の湘南)"
2. ""Koi no PLAN" (恋のPLAN)"
3. ""Senaka Kara Dakishimete" (背中から抱きしめて)"
4. ""Rio no Kakumei" (リオの革命)"

SKE48 Team E 3rd Stage "Boku no Taiyou" (僕の太陽)

1. "Higurashi no Koi" (ヒグラシノコイ)

SKE48 Team S 3rd Stage "Seifuku no Me" (制服の芽) (Revival)

1. "Ookami to Pride" (狼とプライド)
2. "Kareha no Station" (枯葉のステーション)
