= Muteki =

Japanese adult video company

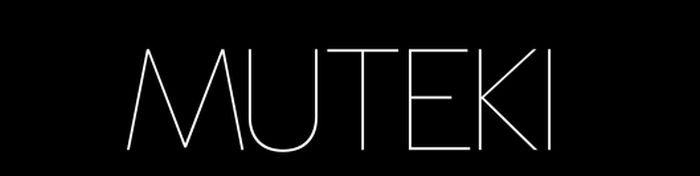
- Industry: Pornography
- Founded: 2008
- Headquarters: Japan
- Products: Pornographic films
- Parent: Hokuto Corporation
- Website: www.mutekimuteki.com/top.html

Muteki is a Japanese adult video company which specializes in casting mainstream entertainers, usually gravure idols or mainstream actresses, in their adult video debuts. It is part of the Hokuto Corporation's roster of companies. The label's first movie was released in September 2008.

Entertainers who have worked under this label include film actresses Yoko Shimada, Tsugumi, Mai Gotō, Chiharu Komatsu, stage actress Chiaki Minase, gravure idols Kimika Yoshino, Fuko, Haruna Hana, Megu Fujiura, and singers Sachiko Suzuki and Akie Harada. Several former members of the AKB48 group have also had their debut at Muteki like Risa Naruse (as Osaka Haruna), former SKE48 member Momona Kitō (Yua Mikami) and Rumi Yonezawa. While most debuts at Muteki were limited to one or a few films, the studio also started the AV careers of many high profile and famous actresses including Hana Haruna, Kaori, Rika Hoshimi, Emiri Okazaki, Yuri Oshikawa and Usa Miharu. Other famous actresses who made their debuts with Muteki include former NMB48 trainee member Risako Okada (as Miko Matsuda) and former Bakusute Sotokanda Icchome member Yu Ito (as Sakura Moko), both of whom were later members of Yua Mikami's own idol group Honey Popcorn.

On December 1, 2018, for Muteki's 10th anniversary, the studio released These Two Have No Equal (TEK-097) co-starring their most famous actresses: Yua Mikami and Shoko Takahashi). The four-hour film was released along with a 3D VR film also starring Mikami and Takahashi. It became one of the label's highest selling films and the second highest selling Japanese adult film of 2018.

== Filmography ==
	Name	Titles (release date)	Main activity	Notes
01	Mio Saegusa	Scandal (September 1, 2008); Sexual (October 1, 2008); Wonderful (November 1, 2008)	Actress, gravure idol	
02	Kimika Yoshino	Impact (October 1, 2008)	Gravure idol	
03	Mika Kayama	Perfect (November 1, 2008); Dynamite (December 1, 2008); Glamorous (January 1, 2009)	Gravure idol	former stage name: Arisa Oda
04	Serena Kozakura	Decameron (December 1, 2008)	Actress, gravure model	
05	Megu Fujiura	Dream (January 1, 2009)	Gravure idol	
06	Fuko	Great (February 1, 2009); Bomber (March 1, 2009); Max (April 1, 2009)	Gravure idol	
07	Tsukimi Shiori	Temptation (April 1, 2009)	Gravure idol, TV personality	
08	Shoko Mimura	Fresh (May 1, 2009)	Gravure idol	
09	Noriko Hamada	Revenge of Love (June 1, 2009)	Singer, member of Saint Four and Pink Jaguar	
10	Sachiko Suzuki	September Shock (September 1, 2009)	Singer, member of Wink	
11	Ira Toda	Cute （October 1, 2009)）	Singer, member of Toys Carnival	
12	Kaori	Perfume (December 1, 2009); Sexsexsex (January 1, 2010); Venus (January 1, 2010); Fuck! (May 1, 2010); Erotic (April 1, 2010); Honey (May 1, 2010); VIP Hip Sex (June 1, 2010); Bitch! (July 1, 2010)	Race queen, gravure idol	
13	Yukari Fujima	Junior Idol (January 1, 2010)	Gravure idol	
14	Shuho Narumi	Young Female Weather Woman (February 1, 2010)	Race queen, actress (stage name Aki Narumi)	
15	Chiaki Minase	Sienne (March 1, 2010)	Takarazuka Revue stage actress	
16	An Nanairo	Yes Ban your AV Girl (April 1, 2010)	Tarento	real name: Eri Ishikawa
17	Seiko	Celebrity Impersonation (June 1, 2010)	Madonna impersonator	
18	Haruna Hana	K Cup Miracle (July 1, 2010); Real Sex (August 1, 2010); Last Sex (September 1, 2010)	Gravure idol	
19	Mai Gotō	Mai lovers (August 1, 2010)	Actress, gravure idol	
20	Yuki Kobayashi	Mosaic nude (September 1, 2010)	Gravure idol	
21	Akie Harada	Purity Saint (November 1, 2010)	Singer, member of Muh	
22	Tsugumi	Actress (December 1, 2010); Clandestine (January 1, 2011)	Actress	
23	Yoko Shimada	Assignation (January 1, 2011); Unfaithful Love (February 1, 2011)		
24	Chiharu Komatsu	Confessions (February 1, 2011); Fate (December 1, 2011)	Actress	
25	Yuri Seino	Virgin Doll AV Liberation (March 1, 2011)	Chakuero idol	
26	Mayuka Okada	Love Body (April 1, 2011); Love Again (May 1, 2011); Love Training (January 1, 2012)	Gravure idol	
27	Rika Hoshimi	AV Decision (September 1, 2011)	Gravure idol	former stage name: Nana Satonaka
28	Saki Kozai	Race Queen (October 1, 2011)	Race queen	
29	Emiri Okazaki	Beauty Girl (November 1, 2011)	Gravure model	
30	Riho Hasegawa	I will have SEX in public! (May 1 '12)	gravure idol	
31	Haruka Nishimoto	Don't you know? (August 1, 2012)	Actress, tarento	
32	Rin Aika	Hat Trick (December 1, 2012)	Fashion model	
33	Azumi Uehara	Azumi Colorless (January 1, 2013)	Singer	
34	Saryu Usui	Real Beauty (February 1, 2013); Suteki (March 1, 2013)	Actress	
35	Rin Ogawa	Super Woman (April 1, 2013)	actress, tarento	
36	Ran Niyama	Bazooka (May 1, 2013)	gravure idol	
37	Yuri Oshikawa	Idol (July 1, 2013)	Gravure model, singer, member of Ebisu Muscats	
38	Miku	Akiba café girl AV debut (August 1, 2013)	Idol	
39	Osaka Haruna	National Icon (October 1, 2013)	singer, member of AKB48	former stage name: Lisa Naruse
40	Asuka Miyama	HEROINE (October 1, 2013); CHANGE (November 1, 2013)	gravure idol	
41	Kamon Yoko	Encounter (November 1, 2013)	actress, tarento	
42	Risa Goto	Desire (December 1, 2013)	actress, gravure idol	
43	Reo Hoshitsuki	AV Debut (March 1, 2014)	gravure idol	
