= Yua Mikami =

Japanese singer and former pornographic actress (born 1993)

- 三上 悠亜
- Mikami in 2018
- Born: Momona Kitō (鬼頭 桃菜); August 16, 1993 (age 33); Nagoya, Aichi Prefecture, Japan
- Occupations: Japanese pornographic film actress; singer
- Height: 1.59 m (5 ft 3 in)
- Musical career
- Genre: J-pop
- Years active: 2009–2014, 2015–present
- Member of: Honey Popcorn
- Formerly of: SKE48; Ebisu Muscats

YouTube information
- Channel: Yua Channel
- Years active: 2016–present
- Genre: Vlog
- Subscribers: 1,130,000
- Views: 177,975,071
- Last updated: 20 October 2026
- Website: mikamiyua.tv

Momona Kitō (Japanese: 鬼頭 桃菜, Hepburn: Kitō Momona; born August 16, 1993), known professionally as Yua Mikami (Japanese: 三上 悠亜, Hepburn: Mikami Yua), is a Japanese singer, YouTuber, and former adult video and film actress. She debuted as a member of the idol group SKE48 in 2009 before leaving in 2014. She entered the adult entertainment industry in 2015 under the Muteki label and became one of the most popular and best-selling contemporary AV idols, winning several awards in the process. Mikami performed under the S1 No. 1 Style label and has appeared in over 200 adult films (including compilations and VR-based AVs as well). In 2023, at the height of her popularity, Mikami retired from the AV industry and continues her career as a social media influencer and a businesswoman.

Apart from performing in adult films, Mikami also remained active as a singer and idol. She is a member of the idol groups Ebisu Muscats since 2015 and Honey Popcorn since 2018. She also appears in the video games Yakuza 6 and Yakuza Kiwami 2.

== Early life ==
Yua Mikami was born as Momona Kitō on August 16, 1993, in Nagoya.

== Career ==
=== 2006–2014: SKE48 activities ===
At age 13, Mikami auditioned for Morning Musume's 8th generation in 2006 but was eliminated during the first round. In March 2009, she debuted as a second generation member of the idol group SKE48 on Team E. Her career in SKE48 saw numerous setbacks, including a demotion to kenkyuusei (trainee) status in December 2010, as well as an underage drinking/dating scandal that broke out in July 2013. On March 16, 2014, she announced her graduation from the group and her last performance with the group was on April 9, 2014. During her tenure, she appeared in eight B-side singles with SKE, as well as an appearance on the sister group AKB48's B-side single "Ano Hi no Fūrin".

=== 2015–present: AV debut, return to music and AV retirement ===
On June 1, 2015, she debuted in the adult entertainment industry under the name Yua Mikami with her first video, Princess Peach, produced by Muteki, a label that specialized on the adult film debuts for former gravure idols and minor celebrities. While Mikami originally planned it as a one-film career, Princess Peach turned out to be a huge success, becoming one of Muteki's highest selling film and one of the highest selling AV's of 2015. The unexpected positive reaction of her debut motivated Mikami to remain in the industry as an active performer. On November 12, 2015, she launched her official website. Her Twitter, and Instagram accounts were also created on the same day. In an interview, Mikami stated: "I entered the world of AV without consulting with anyone. It is my life, so I have to choose for myself."

Her second AV, Pleasure, was released on January 1, 2016. Mikami's first titles were under the Muteki label (becoming one of a few AV actresses who has done more than one title under the studio), before transferring to S1 No. 1 Style in November 2016. On May 13, 2016, Mikami won her first major award at the 2016 DMM Adult Awards at the "Best New Actress" category presented to her by fellow AV actress Moe Amatsuka. On April 13, 2016, she joined the Ebisu Muscats as a second-generation member. She was the poster girl for the 2016 AV Open along with Masami Ichikawa and Rika Hoshimi. She was the event campaign girl for the National Fan Thanksgiving Festival 2016 along with Hibiki Ōtsuki.

Mikami's popularity continued to grow, as she became one of S1's "flagship" actresses, with her films regularly appearing on the best selling charts. In 2018, when Fanza did a research on the Top 10 highest selling AV actresses of the year, Mikami came out at No. 8 at digital downloads and No. 5 at physical DVD/Blu-Ray sales. Mikami won her second major award, at the "Best Actress" category in the 2017 DMM Adult Awards. She also presented the "Best New Actress" award to former gravure idol and debuting AV actress Shoko Takahashi. With both of them debuting at Muteki and being Nagoya-based, Mikami and Takahashi formed a close friendship and started to appear in the variety show SHOW YOUR ROCKETS. For Muteki's tenth anniversary, the pair appeared in their first joint AV-title, These Two Have No Equal released on December 1, 2018. The four-hour-long film was also accompanied by a two-hour-long VR-based adult release. It also became the second best-selling Japanese adult film of 2018.

Mikami also appeared in S1's 15th-anniversary special, along with the studio's other exclusive performers: Tsukasa Aoi, Ayami Shunka, Moe Amatsuka, Arina Hashimoto, Usa Miharu, and Nene Yoshitaka. Mikami currently continues her AV career at S1 and appeared in over 200 titles so far. In 2019 and 2020, according to Fanza, she became the second highest selling AV actress of the year next to Yui Hatano and popular industry newcomer Ichika Matsumoto. In 2021, she reached the number one position, solidifying Mikami's status, as Japan's most popular adult performer.

Despite mainly being an adult performer, Mikami stayed close to her musical roots. On November 22, 2016, she released a solo single, "Ribbon". In 2018, she debuted as a member of the South Korean-based idol group Honey Popcorn with AV idols Moko Sakura and Miko Matsuda. The group was funded by Mikami herself as a passion project. However the group's debut proved to be controversial due to the member's line of work which went against the "pure" image associated with Korean idols. The group was forced to cancel their debut concert due to the outrage and a petition with over 50,000 signatures was passed to the Blue House, demanding the group's ban. Due to the intense backlash Matsuda left Honey Popcorn in December 2018, but Mikami managed to revive the group with three new members, and they released their second EP, De-aeseohsta in July 2019.

In 2017, she was crowned the Best Actress at the DMM Adult Awards, which marked her last appearance at a major industry-related event. In the same year, Mikami also started her own clothing brand, "YOUR'S" (later rebranded as "miyour's", now “MISTREASS”), a career choice largely inspired by her close friend and AV idol Kirara Asuka.

On June 27, 2020, Mikami guest starred in Malaysian singer-songwriter Namewee's new music video titled "I Shot You" (Chinese: 不小心). The video gained 1.4 million views in just over a day.

In June 2022 on the seventh anniversary of her debut, Mikami announced her separation from her representative office One's Double and the establishment of her own "Miss Co., Ltd." in January of the same year, allowing management independecy for Mikami. Her AV activities will continue in a business alliance with One's Double with the possibility of collaborating with other studios.

On March 13, 2023, Mikami announced her retirement from the AV industry on her 30th birthday, August 16, 2023, through her YouTube video.

Her last adult film, Complete AV retirement, the last day. Yua Mikami’s Last Sex, was released on August 15, 2023.

Mikami also owns Majette, a colored contact lens brand, Miss Lash, an eyelash serum brand, and Misshelly, a hair product brand.

In April 2026, Mikami announced the launch of Mieloa, a night bra brand in collaboration with Dazzy Co. Ltd’s lingerie brand DRW. On May 12, Mikami awarded the Most Popular Cheerleader of the Year of the TPBL in 2025–26 season.

== Personal life ==
In July 2013, while she was a member of SKE48, Shūkan Bunshun published pictures of her kissing Yuya Tegoshi, while being allegedly drunk, and staying overnight at his house in May 2013. It caused an uproar, as Mikami was pictured with alcohol and had been under the legal drinking age at that time.

== Filmography ==
=== Television ===
- She was a regular cast member of Muscat Night from April 14, 2016, to March 30, 2017.
- On April 6, 2017, she became a regular cast member of Muscat Night Fever!!!.
- On October 2, 2016, she became a cast member of variety show, Show Your Rockets, along with Shouko Takahashi.
- She has produced over 150 adult films to date, a large number of them under S1 No. 1 Style.

=== Adult films ===
Release date	Title	ID	Company
June 1, 2015	Princess Peach	TEK-067	Muteki
January 1, 2016	Pleasure 快感	TEK-071	Muteki
February 1, 2016	Climax 4 Times 絶頂×4本番	TEK-072	Muteki
April 1, 2016	My Girlfriend is Yua Mikami ボクのカノジョは三上悠亜	TEK-073	Muteki
May 1, 2016	The Finest 5-Star Hotel Where an Idol Will Serve You アイドルがご奉仕してくれる最高級5つ星ソープランド	TEK-076	Muteki
June 1, 2016	Doing Naughty Things with the Female Student Idol After School 女子校生アイドルと放課後にエッチしよっ	TEK-079	Muteki
July 1, 2016	Saliva Intertwined Deep Kissing Sex 唾液を絡める濃厚接吻セックス	TEK-080	Muteki
August 1, 2016	Pleasure Splash! Experiencing a Climax That Feels Too Good for the First Time 快感スプラッシュ!はじめての気持ち良すぎる潮吹き	TEK-081	Muteki
September 1, 2016	Sex That Repeatedly Gives Pleasure and Climax to an Unmovable Idol 身動き出来ないアイドルの快感と絶頂を繰り返すSEX	TEK-083	Muteki
November 25, 2016	Exclusive No.1 Style Yua Mikami's S1 Debut – Lightning Fast Company Transfer – Four Penetrations in Four Hours 専属NO.1 STYLE 三上悠亜エスワンデビュー 電撃移籍4時間×4本番スペシャル	SNIS-786	S1 No.1 Style
December 19, 2016	Mingling Body Fluids, Intense Sex – Completely Uncut Special 交わる体液、濃密セックス 完全ノーカットスペシャル	SNIS-800	S1 No.1 Style
January 25, 2017	Ultra Copious Dream Facials of a National Idol 国民的アイドルに超大量一撃ドリーム顔射	SNIS-825	S1 No.1 Style
February 19, 2017	The National Idol, Yua Mikami's 31 Cosplays! Yua's Daily Masturbation While Cosplaying – Four Hours Transformation Special 国民的アイドル三上悠亜の31コス! コスった悠亜で毎日シコって4時間31変化SP	SNIS-850	S1 No.1 Style
March 19, 2017	92 Orgasms! 3600 Convulsions! 2300cc of Vaginal Discharge! National Idol Is Sexually Awakened by a Huge Convulsion Special 激イキ92回!痙攣3600回!イキ潮2300cc!国民的アイドル エロス覚醒 はじめての大・痙・攣スペシャル	SNIS-872	S1 No.1 Style
April 19, 2017	The National Idol's Sudden Penetration Prank, Four Times, Instantly Connect Everywhere, Climaxing at Anywhere 国民的アイドルいきなり即ハメドッキリ4本番 いつでも即合体、どこでも即絶頂	SNIS-896	S1 No.1 Style
May 19, 2017	Welcome to the Idol Sex Service Mansion of the Highest Class – Mikami Yua's Close Contact Sexual Techniques 150 Full Course 最高級アイドル風俗マンションへようこそ 三上悠亜の密着性感テクニック150分フルコース	SNIS-919	S1 No.1 Style
June 19, 2017	The National Idol Is a Lotion Applying Maid That Only Serves Me 国民的アイドルは僕だけのローションぬるぬるご奉仕メイド	SNIS-940	S1 No.1 Style
July 20, 2017	The National Idol's Serious Juice Leaking Sexual Intercourse 汁汗だくだく唾液涎ダラダラ国民的アイドルの本気汁全漏らし性交	SNIS-964	S1 No.1 Style
August 20, 2017	The National Idol's Adrenaline Explosion! Sexual Desire Bare Teasing After A Month of Abstinence 国民的アイドル アドレナリン大爆発！禁欲1ヶ月後の性欲剥き出し焦らされトラン	SNIS-986	S1 No.1 Style

== Discography ==
=== Singles with SKE48 ===
Release date	No.	Title	Role
November 17, 2010	4	1! 2! 3! 4! Yoroshiku!	B-Side
November 9, 2011	7	Okey Dokey	B-Side
May 16, 2012	9	Aishite-love-ru!	B-Side
September 19, 2012	10	Kiss Datte Hidarikiki	B-Side
January 30, 2013	11	Choco no Dorei	B-Side
July 17, 2013	12	Utsukushii Inazuma	B-Side
November 20, 2013	13	Sansei Kawaii!	B-Side
March 19, 2014	14	Mirai to wa?	B-Side

=== Singles with AKB48 ===
Release date	No.	Title	Role
August 29, 2012	27	Gingham Check	B-Side

== Awards ==
- On May 7, 2016, she received the Best New Actress Award from DMM Adult Award.
- On March 3, 2016, she received the Best Works and FLASH award from Adult Broadcasting Awards.
- On April 23, 2017, she received the Best Actress Award from DMM Adult Award.
