= Tamagawa, Is That You? =

Japanese manga series

- First tankōbon volume cover

玉川さん 出てました? (Tamagawa-san Detemashita?)
- Genre: Erotic comedy
- Manga
- Written by: Ume Matsutake
- Illustrated by: Komikan Matsumoto
- Published by: Square Enix
- English publisher: NA: Square Enix
- Imprint: Young Gangan Comics
- Magazine: Young Gangan
- Original run: December 6, 2024 – present
- Volumes: 5

Tamagawa, Is That You? (玉川さん 出てました?, Tamagawa-san Detemashita?) is a Japanese manga series written by Ume Matsutake and illustrated by Komikan Matsumoto. It began serialization in Square Enix's seinen manga magazine Young Gangan in December 2024.

== Synopsis ==
Shikishima, a man who works in a convenience store, is devastated when he heard the news that his favorite AV idol Yuri Miyama has retired. One day, he is asked to interview a woman named Tamagawa for a part-time job at the store. Then when he approaches her, he is stunned at her resemblance to Yuri Miyama, and left wondering whether if Tamagawa is actually her.

== Media ==
=== Manga ===
Written by Ume Matsutake and illustrated by Komikan Matsumoto, Tamagawa, Is That You? began serialization in Square Enix's seinen manga magazine Young Gangan on December 6, 2024. Its chapters have been collected in five tankōbon volumes as of October 2026.

During their panel at Anime Expo 2026, Square Enix Manga & Books announced that they had licensed the manga for English publication, with the first volume set to release in January 2027.

| No. | Original release date | Original ISBN | English release date | English ISBN |
|---|---|---|---|---|
| 1 | June 25, 2025 | 978-4-7575-9914-7 | January 19, 2027 | 979-8-8991-0096-3 |
| 2 | October 24, 2025 | 978-4-301-00128-7 | — | — |
| 3 | February 25, 2026 | 978-4-301-00341-0 | — | — |
| 4 | June 25, 2026 | 978-4-301-00595-7 | — | — |
| 5 | October 23, 2026 | 978-4-301-00831-6; 978-4-301-00832-3 (SE) | — | — |

=== Other ===
A photoshoot collaboration between the series and former AV idol Yua Mikami was included in the 21st 2025 issue of Young Gangan on October 17, 2025.

In commemoration of the release of the second volume on October 24, 2025, a promotional video containing narration from Tomokazu Sugita was uploaded to Square Enix's YouTube channel that same day.

== Reception ==
The series was ranked 10th in the seventh Sanyodo Bookstore Comic Awards in 2026.
