= Hoshimi =

Hoshimi (written: 星美 or ほしみ in hiragana) may refer to:

- Rika Hoshimi (星美 りか) (born 1990), Japanese gravure model and AV idol
- Hoshimi Station (ほしみ駅, Hoshimi-eki), train station in Teine-ku, Sapporo, Hokkaidō, Japan
