= Honey Popcorn =

South Korean girl group

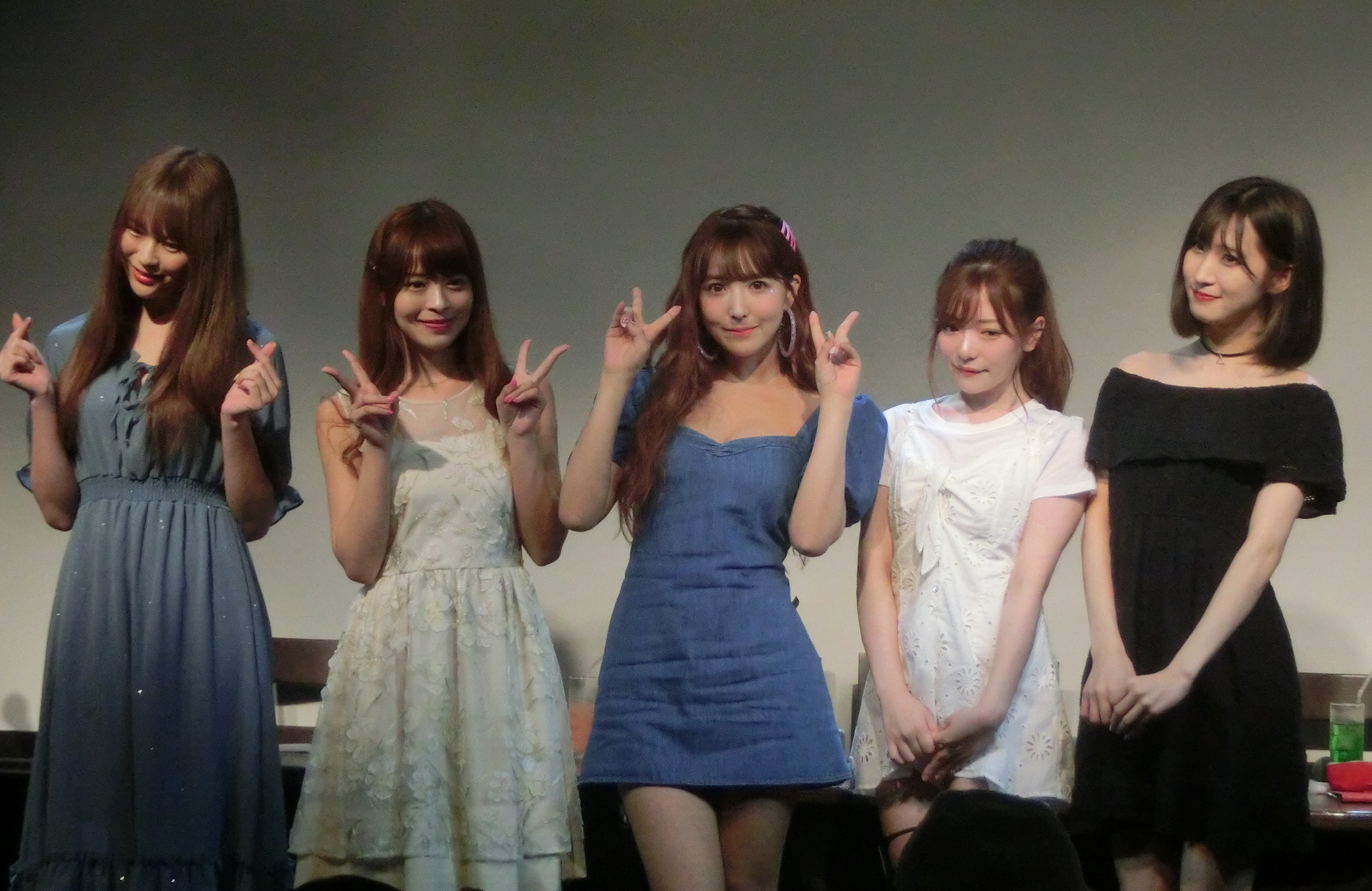

Background information
- Origin: South Korea
- Genres: K-pop; Dance-pop
- Years active: 2018–2021
- Label: Kyun Create
- Members: Yua Mikami; Moko Sakura; Ruka Tajima; Sara Izumi
- Past members: Miko Matsuda; Nako Miyase

Honey Popcorn (Korean: 허니팝콘) was a girl group based in South Korea formed by Kyun Create, consisting of Yua Mikami, Moko Sakura, Ruka Tajima, and Sara Izumi. The group debuted on March 21, 2018, with album Bibidi Babidi Boo.

== History ==
In February 2018, Yua Mikami announced that she would debut in South Korea with a new girl group with Miko Matsuda and Moko Sakura. Prior to this, all three girls had worked as idol singers in Japan, with Mikami as a member of SKE48, Matsuda as a member of NMB48, and Sakura as a member of Bakusute Sotokanda Icchome (a sub-unit of Akihabara Backstage Pass). The group was funded by Mikami herself as a passion project. Their debut was met with controversy by South Korean media outlets due to the members being adult film actresses. On December 23, 2018, Miko Matsuda announced on her Twitter that she will be graduating from the group. In June 2019, Nako Miyase, Ruka Tajima and Sara Izumi joined the group. In December 2020, Nako Miyase left the group. On January 16, 2021, Nako Miyase announced on Twitter that the group had disbanded, but corrected her statement a few days later. Since then, Honey Popcorn is on an indefinite hiatus.

== Discography ==
=== Extended plays ===
Title	Album details	Peak chart positions	Sales
Title	Album details	KOR	Sales
Bibidi Babidi Boo	Released: March 21, 2018; Label: Kyun Create, LOEN Entertainment; Formats: CD, digital download; Track listing: 1. Bibidi Babidi Boo (비비디바비디부); 2. First Kiss; 3. Pretty Lie; 4. Bibidi Babidi Boo Inst. (비비디바비디부 Inst.)	18	KOR: 1,500
De-aeseohsta (디에세오스타)	Released: July 5, 2019; Label: Kyun Create, Genie Music; Formats: CD, digital download; Track listing: 1. De-aeseohsta (디에세오스타 ) 2. 바보야; 3. Violet (피어나)	32	KOR: 1,682

=== Singles ===
Title	Year	Album
"Bibidi Babidi Boo"	2018	Bibidi Babidi Boo
"Pretty Lie 喜歡和你一起"	2018	Non-album single
"De-aeseohsta"	2019	De-aeseohsta (디에세오스타)
