= Igai ni Mango =

Single by SKE48
- Released: July 19, 2017 (Japan)
- Genre: J-Pop
- Length: 4:01
- Label: Avex Group Holdings
- Songwriter(s): Yasushi Akimoto

SKE48 singles chronology
| "Kin no Ai, Gin no Ai" (2016) | "Igai ni Mango" (2017) | "Muishiki no Iro" (2018) |

Short version music video on YouTube
- Igai ni Mango (Short ver.)

Igai ni Mango (意外にマンゴー Surprisingly Mango) is the 21st single from Japanese idol girl group SKE48, being released on July 19, 2017. The song reached number one on the Oricon Weekly Singles Chart, selling 272,872 copies in the first week. It also reached number one on the Billboard Japan Hot 100.

This is the last single to feature Masana Ōya .

== Track listing ==
=== Type A ===
CD+DVD: AVCD-83835/B, AVCD-83839/B
| No. | Title | Length |
|---|---|---|
| 1. | "Igai ni Mango" |
| 2. | "Party ni wa Ikitakunai (Team S)" |
| 3. | "Kiseki no Ryuuseigun (Passion For You Senbatsu)" |
| 4. | "Igai ni Mango (off vocal)" |
| 5. | "Party ni wa Ikitakunai (off vocal)" |
| 6. | "Kiseki no Ryuuseigun (off vocal)" |

=== Type B ===
CD+DVD: AVCD-83836/B, CD+DVD: AVCD-83840/B
| No. | Title | Length |
|---|---|---|
| 1. | "Igai ni Mango" |
| 2. | "En wo Egaku (Team KII)" |
| 3. | "Kiseki no Ryuuseigun (Passion For You Senbatsu)" |
| 4. | "Igai ni Mango (off vocal)" |
| 5. | "En wo Egaku (off vocal)" |
| 6. | "Kiseki no Ryuuseigun (off vocal)" |

=== Type C ===
CD+DVD: AVCD-83837/B, CD+DVD: AVCD-83841/B
| No. | Title | Length |
|---|---|---|
| 1. | "Igai ni Mango" |
| 2. | "Oretoku (Team E)" |
| 3. | "Kiseki no Ryuuseigun (Passion For You Senbatsu)" |
| 4. | "Igai ni Mango (off vocal)" |
| 5. | "Oretoku (off vocal)" |
| 6. | "Kiseki no Ryuuseigun (off vocal)" |

=== Type D ===
CD+DVD: AVCD-83838/B, CD+DVD: AVCD-83842/B
| No. | Title | Length |
|---|---|---|
| 1. | "Igai ni Mango" |
| 2. | "Eien no Legacy (Masana Ōya's graduation song )" |
| 3. | "Kiseki no Ryuuseigun (Passion For You Senbatsu)" |
| 4. | "Igai ni Mango (off vocal)" |
| 5. | "Eien no Legacy (off vocal)" |
| 6. | "Kiseki no Ryuuseigun (off vocal)" |

=== Theater version ===
CD: AVC1-83843
| No. | Title | Length |
|---|---|---|
| 1. | "Igai ni Mango" |
| 2. | "Yume no Kaidan wo Nobore! (SKE48 Kenkyuusei)" |
| 3. | "Kiseki no Ryuuseigun (Passion For You Senbatsu)" |
| 4. | "SKE48 21st Single Medley" |
| 5. | "Igai ni Mango (off vocal)" |
| 6. | "Yume no Kaidan wo Nobore! (off vocal)" |
| 7. | "Kiseki no Ryuuseigun (off vocal)" |

NOTE: Theater version doesn't include a Bonus DVD

== Personnel ==
=== "Igai ni Mango (Senbatsu)" ===
The performers of the main single are:

- Team S: Kitagawa Ryoha, Jurina Matsui
- Team KII: Ego Yuna, Oba Mina, Obata Yuna, Kitano Ruka, Souda Sarina, Takayanagi Akane, Takeuchi Saki, Hidaka Yuzuki, Furuhata Nao
- Team E: Kimoto Kanon, Kumazaki Haruka, Goto Rara, Suda Akari
- Kenkyuusei: Yahagi Yukina

=== "Party ni wa Ikitakunai" ===
"Party ni wa Ikitakunai" was performed by Team S members, consisting of:

- Team S: Isshiki Rena, Inuzuka Asana, Oya Masana, Kamimura Ayuka, Kitagawa Ryoha, Goto Risako, Sugiyama Aika, Tsuzuki Rika, Nojima Kano, Futamura Haruka, Machi Otoha, Matsui Jurina, Matsumoto Chikako, Yamauchi Suzuran, Yamada Juna

=== "En wo Egaku" ===
"En wo Egaku" was performed by Team KII members, consisting of:

- Team KII: Aoki Shiori, Arai Yuki, Uchiyama Mikoto, Ego Yuna, Ota Ayaka, Oba Mina, Obata Yuna, Kitano Ruka, Shirai Kotono, Souda Sarina, Takagi Yumana, Takatsuka Natsuki, Takayanagi Akane, Takeuchi Saki, Hidaka Yuzuki, Furuhata Nao, Matsumura Kaori, Mizuno Airi

=== "Oretoku" ===
"Oretoku" was performed by Team E members, consisting of:

- Team E: Asai Yuka, Ida Reona, Ichino Narumi, Kamata Natsuki, Kimoto Kanon, Kumazaki Haruka, Goto Rara, Saito Makiko, Sato Sumire, Suenaga Oka, Sugawara Maya, Suda Akari, Takatera Sana, Takahata Yuki, Tani Marika, Fukushi Nao

=== "Eien no Legacy" ===
"Eien no Legacy" was performed by Masana Ōya:

- Team S: Masana Ōya

=== "Yume no Kaidan wo Nobore!" ===
"Yume no Kaidan wo Nobore!" was performed by Kenkyuusei members, consisting of:

- Kenkyuusei: Aikawa Honoka, Atsumi Ayaha, Ishikawa Saki, Ishiguro Yuzuki, Inoue Ruka, Oshiba Rinka, Okada Miku, Kataoka Narumi, Kitagawa Yoshino, Kurashima Ami, Sakamoto Marin, Sato Kaho, Shirayuki Kohaku, Nakamura Izumi, Nonogaki Miki, Nomura Miyo, Fukai Negai, Morihira Riko, Yahagi Yukina, Wada Aina

=== "Kiseki no Ryuuseigun" ===
"Kiseki no Ryuuseigun" was performed by the SKE48 grouping Passion For You Senbatsu, consisting of:

- Team S: Oya Masana, Goto Risako, Futamura Haruka, Matsui Jurina, Matsumoto Chikako
- Team KII: Aoki Shiori, Arai Yuki, Ego Yuna, Ota Ayaka, Oba Mina, Shirai Kotono, Takayanagi Akane, Takeuchi Saki, Furuhata Nao
- Team E: Kamata Natsuki, Suda Akari

== Release history ==
| Region | Date | Format | Label |
|---|---|---|---|
| Japan | July 19, 2017 | CD; digital download; streaming | Avex |
| South Korea | July 31, 2017 (all types combined) | digital download; streaming | SM; iriver |

== MNL48 Version ==
SKE48's sister group in Manila, Philippines, MNL48 released a cover of the song with the same name. MNL48's version was released as a coupling song on their third single "365 Araw ng Eroplanong Papel". This MNL48 version is performed by Team L, a sub-team within the group. The center for the music video is MNL48 Sela, the second most popular member of the group based on their election. The music video was released on YouTube in June 2019 and was shot in Star City.
