= Yui Matsushita =

- 松下 唯
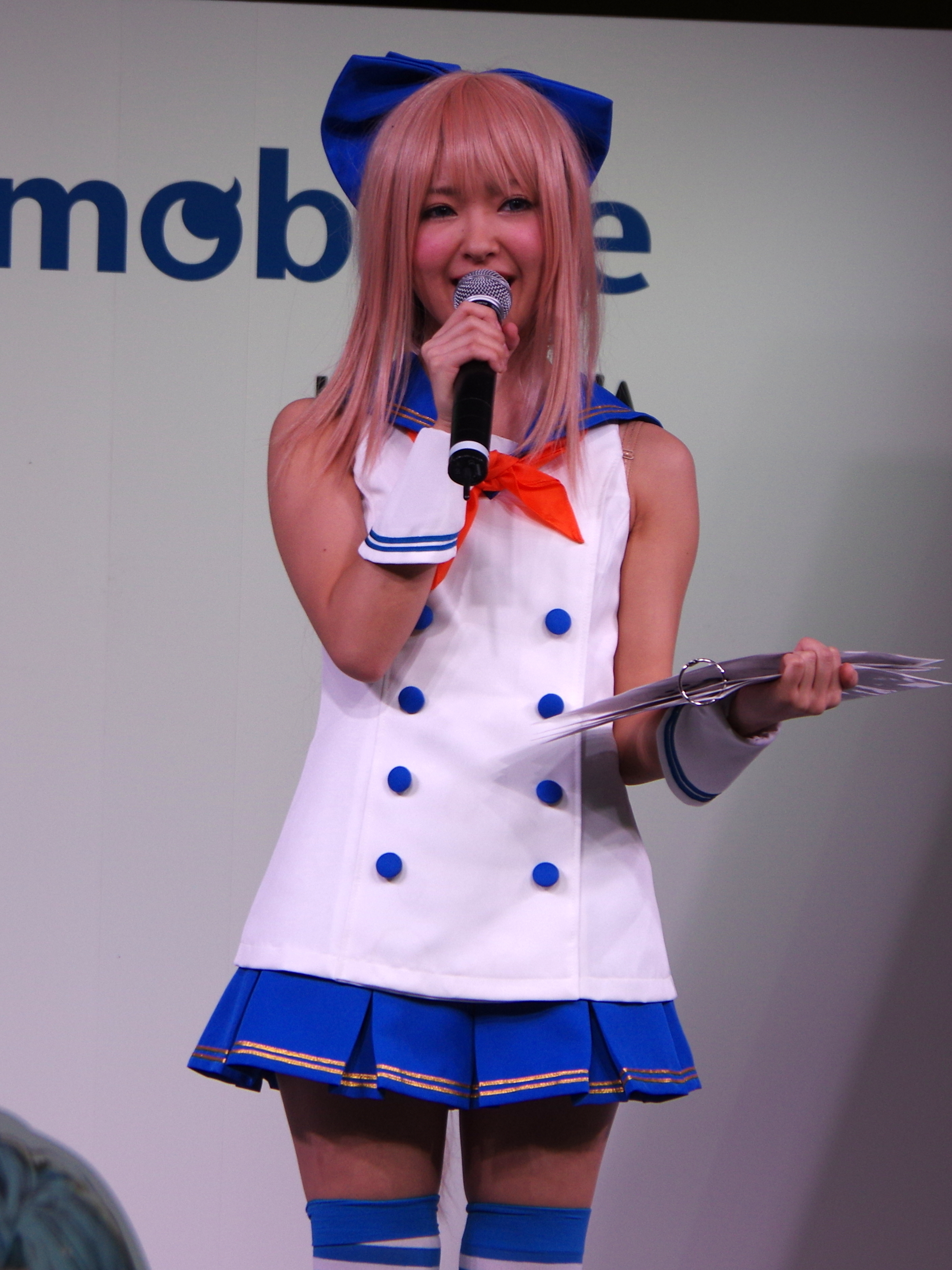
- Matsushita in 2014
- Born: July 25, 1988 (age 37); Fukuoka Prefecture, Japan
- Musical career
- Instrument: Vocals
- Years active: 2008–2015
- Formerly of: SKE48

Yui Matsushita (松下唯, Matsushita Yui; born July 25, 1988 in Fukuoka Prefecture) is a Japanese female idol, voice actress and singer, formerly a member of the Japanese idol girl group SKE48.

== Biography ==
Born on 25 July 1988 in Fukuoka Prefecture. She commenced her performing career in July 2008 upon passing the auditions for the Nagoya-based idol group SKE. As a member of the group's first generation, she also served as inaugural president of the group's Anime, Manga and Games Society, an in-house club for members passionate about anime, manga and gaming.

In February 2010 she was diagnosed with osteochondritis dissecans affecting both ankles and entered a long-term hiatus from theatre performances in order to undergo surgery and rehabilitation. She formally graduated from SKE48 at the end of September 2011 after it became clear that a full return to intensive dance performance would be difficult.

After leaving SKE48 she resumed work in the entertainment industry in early 2012, combining acting jobs, voice acting and live appearances with plans for a solo music career. On 22 May 2013, she released the debut solo single "Shooting Star". On 9 October 2013, she released the anime song cover album Schoolgirl Anthem: A Collection of School Anime Songs, an album featuring nine newly recorded anime themes alongside three original songs including "Shooting Star". That same month, she stated in an interview that she had been fond of anime since childhood, with her two hobbies being eating ramen and cosplay.

In November 2015, she announced on Twitter her resignation from Birth Entertainment and withdrawal from the entertainment industry. While she did not disclose the reasons for stepping down, she stated, "I have so much I wish to convey and so much gratitude to express, but as I cannot quite find the words, I have simply made this report."
