= Rena Matsui =

Japanese actor, singer, and novelist

- 松井 玲奈
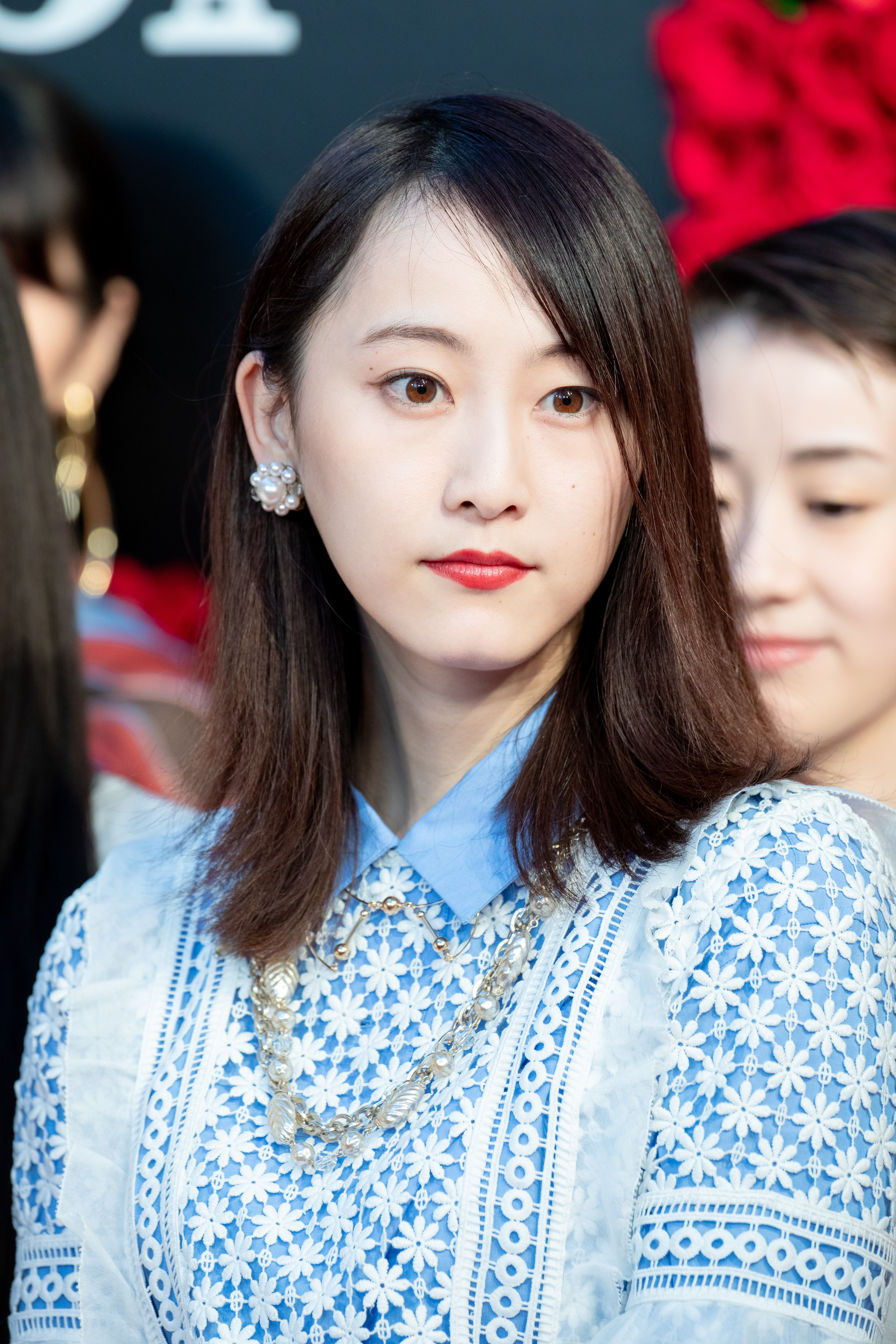
- Matsui at the Tokyo International Film Festival 2018
- Born: 27 July 1991 (age 35); Toyohashi, Aichi, Japan
- Occupations: Actress; novelist
- Years active: 2008–present
- Spouse: Akihisa Kondo (m. 2024)
- Musical career
- Genres: J-pop
- Instruments: vocals; trumpet
- Labels: Nippon Crown; Avex Trax; Sony Records/N46Div
- Formerly of: SKE48; Nogizaka46; AKB48

Rena Matsui (松井 玲奈, Matsui Rena; born July 27, 1991) is a Japanese actress, novelist, and former singer. Matsui is a former member of the Japanese idol girl groups SKE48 and Nogizaka46. As a member of the former, she also participated in the main lineup of AKB48's singles. As an actress, she has played roles in numerous films and television series, including Kamen Rider Build the Movie: Be the One and the 99th NHK asadora Manpuku.

== Early life ==
Matsui was born in Toyohashi, Aichi Prefecture on July 27, 1991. She participated in the first SKE48 audition, held in July 2008, and was selected to join the group.

== Career ==
=== SKE48 and Nogizaka46 ===
Team S made its debut on October 5, 2008. She was also chosen to be in the main lineup for AKB48's single "10nen Zakura". Her first photobook, titled Kingyo, was published on March 1, 2012. In April 2013, SKE48 reorganized the teams, and Matsui was appointed the captain of Team E. In AKB48's 2013 General Election, she placed seventh overall with 73,173 votes.

In the AKB48 Group Daisokaku Matsuri, held February 24, 2014, she became a member of Nogizaka46 while remaining in SKE48's Team E. She made her debut as a member of Nogizaka46 during the group's handshake event for their single "Kizuitara Katamoi" at the Makuhari Messe convention center in Chiba on April 13, 2014. For her first performance with Nogizaka46, Rena Matsui performed "Kizuitara Kataomoi" with the other members of the group. She published her second photobook, titled Hemeretto, on April 1, 2014. In AKB48's 2014 General Election, she placed fifth overall with 69,790 votes. On March 26, 2015, during a concert at Saitama Super Arena, it was announced that her concurrent position in Nogizaka46 would be cancelled.

On June 11, 2015, she announced that she would graduate from SKE48 at the end of August. Her graduation concert, titled "Matsui Rena SKE48 Graduation Concert in Toyota Stadium: 2588 Days" was held on August 30, 2015, at Toyota Stadium. Her last performance with SKE48 occurred the following day.

=== Acting ===
Since graduating from SKE48, Matsui has worked as an actress in several TV series and films, including Kamen Rider Build the Movie: Be the One and the ninety-ninth NHK asadora Manpuku. Matsui opened her YouTube channel in 2021.

=== Writing ===
Matsui made her debut as a fiction writer in 2018, publishing the short story "Nugutte mo, nugutte mo" in the literary journal Subaru. The story was included in her first short story collection, titled Camouflage, which was published by Shueisha in 2019. Her second book of fiction, titled Ruirui and consisting of five connected stories, was published by Shueisha in 2021. That same year a collection of previously published and new essays about her experiences with food, titled Secret Food, was published by Magazine House.

== Personal life ==
On January 3, 2024, Matsui and singer-songwriter Akihisa Kondo jointly announced through their respective social media accounts that they had officially married.

== Bibliography ==
=== Photobooks ===
Year	Title	Source
2012	Kingyo	
2014	Hemeretto	

== Filmography ==
=== Films ===
Year	Title	Role	Notes	Source
2014	Gift	Saori Yamane	Lead role	
2017	Opening Night	Rina		
2017	Laughing Lucky Cats	Honda Akako	Lead role	
2017	Megamisama	Rika Sakura	Lead role	
2018	Kamen Rider Build the Movie: Be the One	Ryoka Saiga/Scissors Lost Smash		
2019	Bento Harassment	Wakaba Mochimaru		
2019	21st Century Girl		Anthology film	
2019	Wachigaiya Itosato	Yoshie		
2019	Blood Friends			
2020	Looking for Magical Doremi	Mire Yoshizuki (voice)	Lead role	
2021	Zokki			
2021	Back to That Day	Manami Saitō	Lead role	
2022	The Nighthawk's First Love	Aiko	Lead role	
2023	Dependence	Kyoko		
2023	Saga Saga	Kyoko Oyamada	Lead role	
2024	Gold Boy	Shizuka		
2024	Cha-Cha			

=== Television drama ===
Year	Title	Role	Notes	Source
2010	Okagesamade!			
2010	Chuugakusei Nikki	Rena Morikawa		
2011	Mousou Deka	Herself (Celebrity judge)		
2011	Oshare ni Koi Shita Cinderella: Okarie ga Yumi o Kanaeru Made	Matsuoka Rie		
2011	Shin Anata no Shiranai Sekai	Rie	One episode	
2012	Gakkou no Kaidan			
2012-17	Nagoya Iki Saishuu Ressha			
2016	Fragile	Naomi Hibako		
2017	Million Yen Women	Hitomi Tsukamoto		
2018	Manpuku	Toshiko Kano	Asadora	
2019	Sherlock: Untold Stories	Mari Mizuno	Episode 1	
2020	Yell	Gin Sekiuchi	Asadora	
2020	30 Kin Sore wa 30-sai Miman Okotowari no Koi	Shino Moriyama		
2021	Promise Cinderella	Kikuno/Akira Kagami		
2022	Boy's Abyss	Yuri Shibasawa		
2023	What Will You Do, Ieyasu?	Oman	Taiga drama	
2024	Omusubi	Mika "Chanmika" Aihara	Asadora	

=== Television animation ===
Year	Title	Role	Notes	Source
2015	Ultimate Otaku Teacher	Suzune Kagami		
2023–present	Sydney Sailboat	Sydney	Japanese dubbing	

=== Other television ===
Year	Title	Notes	Source
????	Dera SKE		
2011-12	SKE48 no Sekai Seifuku Joshi		
2011-13	SKE48 no Magical Radio		
2014-15	NogiBingo!		
2015	Animaga		

=== Theater ===
Year	Title	Role	Venue(s)	Source
2014	16-nin no Principal Trois		Akasaka ACT Theater	
2015	Majisuka Gakuen Stage Play	Gekikara	AiiA Theater	

== Discography ==
=== Singles with SKE48 ===
Year	No.	Title	Role	Notes
2009	1	"Tsuyoki Mono yo"	A-side	Debut with Team S.
2010	2	"Aozora Kataomoi"	A-side	
2010	3	"Gomen ne, Summer"	A-side	
2010	4	"1! 2! 3! 4! Yoroshiku!"	A-side	
2011	5	"Banzai Venus"	A-side, Akagumi, Center	Also sang on "Dareka no Sei ni wa Shinai" as subgroup Akagumi.
2011	6	"Pareo wa Emerald"	A-side, Akagumi, Selection 8	Also sang on "Tsumiki no Jikan"; "Papa wa Kirai" as Akagumi; "Hanabi wa Owaranai" as Selection 8.
2011	7	"Okey Dokey"	A-side, Akagumi, Selection 8	Also sang on "Hatsukoi no Fumikiri"; "Hohoemi no Positive Thinking" as Akagumi; "Utaōyo, Bokutachi no Kōka" as Selection 8
2012	8	"Kataomoi Finally"	A-side, Akagumi, Selection 8	Also sang on "Kyō made no Koto, Korekara no koto"; "Koe ga Kasureru Kurai" as Akagumi; "Kamoki no Tsuki" as Selection 8.
2012	9	"Aishite-love-ru!"	A-side	Also sang on "Nante Ginga wa Arui no Darou".
2012	10	"Kiss Datte Hidarikiki"	A-side, Center	
2013	11	"Choco no Dorei"	A-side	Also sang on "Bike to Sidecar".
2013	12	"Utsukushii Inazuma"	A-side, Center, Boat Pier Senbatsu	First single as member of Team E. Also sang on ""Seishun no Mizushibuki" as Boat Pier Senbatsu; "Shalala na Calendar" as Team E.
2013	13	"Sansei Kawaii!"	A-side, Center	
2014	14	"Mirai to wa?"	A-side	Also sang on "GALAXY of DREAMS"; "Machiawasetai"
2014	15	"Bukiyō Taiyō"	A-side	
2014	16	"12 Gatsu no Kangaroo"	A-side	
2015	17	"Coquettish Jūtai Chū"	A-side, Center	
2015	18	"Mae Nomeri"	A-side, Center	First Center and last to participate of the Single in SKE48. Also sang on "Nagai Yume no Labyrinth" and "2588 Days" which is her graduation song.

=== Singles with AKB48 ===
Year	No.	Title	Role	Notes
2009	11	"10nen Sakura"	A-side	First single with AKB48 as member of SKE48.
2009	12	"Namida Surprise!"	A-side	
2009	13	"Iiwake Maybe"	Under Girls	Ranked 29th in 2009 General Election. Sang on "Tobenai Agehachō".
2009	14	"River"	Under Girls	Sang on "Kimi no Koto ga Suki Dakara".
2010	15	"Sakura no Shiori"	B-side	Sang on "Majisuka Rock 'n' Roll"
2010	16	"Ponytail to Shushu"	Under Girls	Sang on "Nusumareta Kuchibiru" and "Majijo Teppen Blues".
2010	17	"Heavy Rotation"	A-side	Ranked 11th in 2010 General Election. Also sang on "Yasai Sisters".
2010	18	"Beginner"	A-side	
2011	20	"Sakura no Ki ni Narō"	A-side	
2011	–	"Dareka no Tame ni - What can I do for someone?"	–	Charity single
2011	21	"Everyday, Katyusha"	A-side	Also sang on "Yankee Soul".
2011	22	"Flying Get"	A-side	Ranked 10th in 2011 General Election.
2011	23	"Kaze wa Fuiteiru"	A-side	
2011	24	"Ue kara Mariko"	B-side	Did not sing on A-side; lineup was determined by a rock-paper-scissors tournament. Sang on "Noel no Yoru"
2012	25	"Give Me Five!"	A-side (Baby Blossom), Special Girls B	Played trumpet in Baby Blossom. Also sang on "Hitsujikai no Tabi" as Special Girls B.
2012	26	"Manatsu no Sounds Good!"	A-side	Also sang on "Gugutasu no Sora".
2012	27	"Gingham Check"	A-side	Ranked 10th in 2012 General Election.
2012	28	"Uza"	A-side	
2012	29	"Eien Pressure"	B-side	Did not sing on A-side; lineup was determined by a rock-paper-scissors tournament. Sang on "Tsuyogari Tokei" with SKE48.
2013	30	"So Long!"	A-side	
2013	31	"Sayonara Crawl"	A-side	
2013	32	"Koi Suru Fortune Cookie"	A-side	Ranked 7th in 2013 General Election.
2013	33	"Heart Electric"	A-side	
2013	34	"Suzukake no Ki no Michi de "Kimi no Hohoemi o Yume ni Miru" to Itte Shimattara Bokutachi no Kankei wa Dō Kawatte Shimau no ka, Bokunari ni Nan-nichi ka Kangaeta Ue de no Yaya Kihazukashii Ketsuron no Yō na Mono"	B-side	Did not participate in the A-side. Lineup was determined by a rock-paper-scissors tournament. Sang on "Mosh & Dive" and "Escape"
2014	35	"Mae shika Mukanee"	A-side	
2014	36	"Labrador Retriever"	A-side	
2014	37	"Kokoro no Placard"	A-side	Ranked 5th in 2014 General Election.
2014	38	"Kibouteki Refrain"	A-side	
2015	39	"Green Flash"	A-side	
2015	40	"Bokutachi wa Tatakawanai"	A-side	Last single she participated in.

=== Singles with Nogizaka46 ===
Year	No.	Title	Role	Notes
2014	9	"Natsu no Free & Easy"	A-side	First single with Nogizaka46 as concurrent member. Also sang on "Sono Saki no Deguchi"
2014	10	"Nandome no Aozora ka?"	A-side	Also sang on "Korogatta Kane o Narase!"
2015	11	"Inochi wa Utsukushii"	A-side	Last single with Nogizaka46

=== Solo singles ===
Year	No.	Title	Role	Notes
2016	1	"Shabon"	With Charan-Po-Rantan	Solo debut single.

== Stage units ==
=== Team S 1st Stage ===
- クラスメイト (Classmate)
- 星の温度 (Hoshi no ondo)

=== Team S 2nd Stage ===
- 雨のピアニスト (Ame no Pianist (1st Unit))
- チョコの行方 (Choco no Yukue (2nd Unit))

=== Team S 3rd Stage ===
- 枯葉のステーション (Kareha no Station (Solo))
- Omoide Ijou (2nd Unit)

=== Team E 3rd Stage ===
- ヒグラシノコ (Higurashi no Koi)

=== Team E 4th Stage ===
- この胸のバーコード (Kono Mune no Barcode)
