= Mirai to wa? =

- Mirai to Wa Type A Regular Edition Cover

Single by SKE48
- Released: March 19, 2014 (Japan)
- Genre: J-pop
- Label: Avex Trax

SKE48 singles chronology
"Sansei Kawaii!" (2013)	"Mirai to wa?" (2014)	"Bukiyō Taiyō" (2014)

"Mirai to wa?" (未来とは?) is the 14th single by SKE48. It was released on March 19, 2014. It debuted in number one on the weekly Oricon Singles Chart. It was the best-selling single in March and the 13th best-selling single of the year in Japan, with 503,917 copies. It debuted in number one on the Billboard Japan Hot 100.

== Track listing ==
=== TYPE-A ===
CD
No.	Title	Artist(s)	Length
1.	"Mirai to Wa?" (未来とは?, CM song for GMO Internet's "お名前.com", ASBee's "ASBee x SKE48" and famima.com)		4:59
2.	"GALAXY of DREAMS" (CM song for Samsung Japan)	GALAXY of DREAMS	3:26
3.	"Mayflower"	Dragon Girls	4:23
4.	"Mirai to Wa? (Off vocal)"
5.	"GALAXY of DREAMS (Off vocal)"
6.	"Mayflower (Off vocal)"

DVD
No.	Title	Length
1.	"Mirai to Wa? (Music Video)"
2.	"Mirai to Wa? ~2014.02.02 Toukekki Shuukai. "Hako de Ose!" @ Nagoya Dome~"
3.	"GALAXY of DREAMS (Music Video)"
4.	"Bonus Video I Kenkyuusei "Matsumura no Aikata Sagashi Kikaku" ~Kenkyuusei ni Nise Saimin Jutsushi ga Hatsu Dokkiri!~"

=== TYPE-B ===
CD
No.	Title	Artist(s)	Length
1.	"Mirai to Wa?" (未来とは?, CM song for GMO Internet's "お名前.com", ASBee's "ASBee x SKE48" and famima.com)		4:59
2.	"Neko no Shippo ga Pin to Tatteru you ni" (猫の尻尾がピンと立ってるように)	Team S	5:39
3.	"Mayflower"	Dragon Girls	4:23
4.	"Mirai to Wa? (Off vocal)"
5.	"Neko no Shippo ga Pin to Tatteru you ni (Off vocal)"
6.	"Mayflower (Off vocal)"

DVD
No.	Title	Length
1.	"Mirai to Wa? (Music Video)"
2.	"Mirai to Wa? ~2014.02.02 Toukekki Shuukai. "Hako de Ose!" @ Nagoya Dome~"
3.	"Neko no Shippo ga Pin to Tatteru you ni (Music Video)"
4.	"Bonus Video II Team S "Hajimete no Joshikai" ~Member no Honne wo Profiling~"

=== TYPE-C ===
CD
No.	Title	Artist(s)	Length
1.	"Mirai to Wa?" (未来とは?, CM song for GMO Internet's "お名前.com", ASBee's "ASBee x SKE48" and famima.com)		4:59
2.	"S-ko to Usohakkenki" (S子と嘘発見器)	Team KII	3:19
3.	"Mayflower"	Dragon Girls	4:23
4.	"Mirai to Wa? (Off vocal)"
5.	"S-ko to Usohakkenki (Off vocal)"
6.	"Mayflower (Off vocal)"

DVD
No.	Title	Length
1.	"Mirai to Wa? (Music Video)"
2.	"Mirai to Wa? ~2014.02.02 Toukekki Shuukai. "Hako de Ose!" @ Nagoya Dome~"
3.	"S-ko to Usohakkenki (Music Video)"
4.	"Bonus Video III Team KII "Freestyle RAP battle with Dasu Radar" ~KII Member ga Hatsu Rap ni Chousen~"

=== TYPE-D ===
CD
No.	Title	Artist(s)	Length
1.	"Mirai to Wa?" (未来とは?, CM song for GMO Internet's "お名前.com", ASBee's "ASBee x SKE48" and famima.com)		4:59
2.	"Machi Awasetai" (待ち合せたい)	Team E	4:34
3.	"Mayflower"	Dragon Girls	4:23
4.	"Mirai to Wa? (Off vocal)"
5.	"Machi Awasetai (Off vocal)"
6.	"Mayflower (Off vocal)"

DVD
No.	Title	Length
1.	"Mirai to Wa? (Music Video)"
2.	"Mirai to Wa? ~2014.02.02 Toukekki Shuukai. "Hako de Ose!" @ Nagoya Dome~"
3.	"Machi Awasetai (Music Video)"
4.	"Bonus Video IV Team E "Member no Naka ni Iru Hetare~ze wo Sagase!" ~Hajimete no Uragiri~"

=== Theater Edition ===
CD
No.	Title	Length
1.	"Mirai to Wa?" (未来とは?, CM song for GMO Internet's "お名前.com", ASBee's "ASBee x SKE48" and famima.com)	4:59
2.	"Bokura no Kizuna" (僕らの絆)	4:51
3.	"SKE48 14th Single Medley"	5:07
4.	"Mirai to Wa? (Off vocal)"
5.	"Bokura no Kizuna (Off vocal)"

== Members ==
=== Mirai to Wa? ===
Team S: Anna Ishida, Masana Ona, Yuria Kizaki, Jurina Matsui
Team KII: Mina Oba, Aya Shibata, Akari Suda, Akane Takayanagi, Airi Furukawa, Mizuho Yamada
Team E: Rion Azuma, Madoka Umemoto, Kanon Kimoto, Nao Furuhata, Rena Matsui
Kenkyuusei: Ryoha Kitagawa

=== Mayflower ===
Team S: Anna Ishida
Team KII: Rumi Kato, Akari Suda, Akane Takayanagi, Mai Takeuchi, Haruka Futamura, Airi Furukawa
Team E: Madoka Umemoto, Yukiko Kinoshita

=== GALAXY of DREAMS ===
Team S: Yuria Kizaki, Jurina Matsui
Team KII: Aya Shibata, Akari Suda, Akane Takayanagi, Airi Furukawa
Team E: Kanon Kimoto, Nao Furuhata, Rena Matsui
Kenkyuusei: Ryoha Kitagawa

=== Neko no Shippo ga Pin to Tatteru you ni ===
Team S: Riho Abiru, Anna Ishida, Kyoka Isohara, Yuna Ego, Masana Oya, Yuria Kizaki, Risako Goto, Makiko Saito, Rika Tsuzuki, Aki Deguchi, Yuka Nakanishi, Jurina Matsui, Manatsu Mukaida, Miki Yakata

=== S-ko to Usohakkenki ===
Team KII: Mikoto Uchiyama, Mina Oba, Tomoko Kato, Rumi Kato, Ami Kobayashi, Mieko Sato, Aya Shibata, Akari Suda, Yumana Takagi, Akane Takayanagi, Mai Takeuchi, Haruka Futamura, Airi Furukawa, Rina Matsumoto, Yukari Yamashita, Mizuho Yamada

=== Machi Awasetai ===
Team E: Rion Azuma, Shiori Iguchi, Narumi Ichino, Tsugumi Iwanaga, Madoka Umemoto, Shiori Kaneko, Momona Kito, Yukiko Kinoshita, Kanon Kimoto, Mei Sakai, Nao Furuhata, Rena Matsui, Honoka Mizuno, Ami Miyamae, Reika Yamada

=== Bokura no Kizuna ===
Team S: Riho Abiru, Anna Ishida, Kyoka Isohara, Makiko Saito, Manatsu Mukaida
Team KII: Mikoto Uchiyama, Tomoko Kato, Rumi Kato, Akane Takayanagi, Airi Furukawa, Rina Matsumoto
Team E: Shiori Iguchi, Momona Kito, Reika Yamada
