= Kin no Ai, Gin no Ai =

Single by SKE48
- Released: August 17, 2016 (Japan)
- Genre: J-Pop
- Length: 4:21
- Label: Avex Group Holdings
- Songwriter(s): Yasushi Akimoto

SKE48 singles chronology
"Chicken Line" (2016)	"Kin no Ai, Gin no Ai" (2016)	"Igai ni Mango" (2017)

Short version music video on YouTube
- Kin no Ai, Gin no Ai (Short ver.)

Kin no Ai, Gin no Ai (金の愛、銀の愛 Golden Love, Silver Love) is the 20th single from Japanese idol girl group SKE48, being released on August 17, 2016. The song reached number one on the Oricon Weekly Singles Chart, selling 251,639 copies in the first week. It also reached number one on the Billboard Japan Hot 100.

The title track is the main theme for the television drama Death Cash, which also starts SKE48 member Jurina Matsui and is her first lead actress role.

The song was released on multiple CD editions which came with a full version of a music video, which will not be released on YouTube. (Note: Even after the release of the 21st single, the official SKE48 channel did not release the full version of their music video on YouTube.) The only performance for the full song, aired on AKB48 SHOW, on August 20, 2016. This is the last single to feature Aya Shibata.

== Track listing ==
=== Type A ===
CD+DVD: AVCD-83594/B, AVCD-83598/B
No.	Title	Length
1.	"Kin no Ai, Gin no Ai"
2.	"Happy rankings (Ranking Girls)"
3.	"Kon'ya wa Shake it ! (Love Crescendo)"
4.	"Kin no Ai, Gin no Ai (off vocal)"
5.	"Happy rankings (off vocal)"
6.	"Kon'ya wa Shake it ! (off vocal)"

=== Type B ===
CD+DVD: AVCD-83595/B, CD+DVD: AVCD-83599/B
No.	Title	Length
1.	"Kin no Ai, Gin no Ai"
2.	"Madogiwa LOVER (Next Selection)"
3.	"Kon'ya wa Shake it ! (Love Crescendo)"
4.	"Kin no Ai, Gin no Ai (off vocal)"
5.	"Madogiwa LOVER (off vocal)"
6.	"Kon'ya wa Shake it ! (off vocal)"

=== Type C ===
CD+DVD: AVCD-83600/B, CD+DVD: AVCD-83597/B
No.	Title	Length
1.	"Kin no Ai, Gin no Ai"
2.	"Sayonara ga Utsukushikute (Aya Shibata's graduation song)"
3.	"Kon'ya wa Shake it ! (Love Crescendo)"
4.	"Kin no Ai, Gin no Ai (off vocal)"
5.	"Sayonara ga Utsukushikute (off vocal)"
6.	"Kon'ya wa Shake it ! (off vocal)"

=== Type D ===
CD+DVD: AVCD-83601/B
No.	Title	Length
1.	"Kin no Ai, Gin no Ai"
2.	"ii Hito ii Hito Sagi (Yanchana Tenshi to Yasashi Akuma)"
3.	"Kon'ya wa Shake it ! (Love Crescendo)"
4.	"Kin no Ai, Gin no Ai (off vocal)"
5.	"ii Hito ii Hito Sagi (off vocal)"
6.	"Kon'ya wa Shake it ! (off vocal)"

=== Theater version ===
CD: AVC1-83602
No.	Title	Length
1.	"Kin no Ai, Gin no Ai"
2.	"Kon'ya wa Shake it ! (Love Crescendo)"
3.	"SKE48 20th Single Medley"
4.	"Kin no Ai, Gin no Ai (off vocal)"
5.	"Kon'ya wa Shake it ! (off vocal)"

NOTE: Theater version doesn't include a Bonus DVD

== Personnel ==
=== "Kin no Ai, Gin no Ai" ===
The performers of the main single are:

- Team S: Azuma Rion, Oya Masana, Kitagawa Ryoha, Futamura Haruka, Jurina Matsui
- Team KII: Ego Yuna, Oba Mina, Souda Sarina, Takayanagi Akane, Furuhata Nao, Takeuchi Saki, Hidaka Yuzuki
- Team E: Kimoto Kanon, Kumazaki Haruka, Goto Rara, Saito Makiko, Suda Akari, Tani Marika

=== "Happy Rankings" ===
"Happy Rankings was performed by the SKE48 grouping Ranking Girls, consisting of:

- Team S: Kitagawa Ryoha, Takeuchi Mai, Futamura Haruka, Matsui Jurina, Miyamae Ami, Yamauchi Suzuran
- Team KII: Ego Yuna, Oba Mina, Souda Sarina, Takayanagi Akane, Takeuch Sakii, Hidaka Yuzuki, Furuhata Nao
- Team E: Kamata Natsuki, Kimoto Kanon, Kumazaki Haruka, Sakai Mei, Sato Sumire, Suda Akari, Tani Marika

=== "Madogiwa Lover" ===
"Madogiwa Lover" was performed by the SKE48 grouping Next Selection, consisting of:

- Team S: Noguchi Yume, Matsumoto Chikako
- Team KII: Arai Yuki, Kitano Ruka
- Team E: Ichino Narumi, Kamata Natsuki, Takatera Sana, Fukushi Nao

=== "Sayonara ga Utsukushikute" ===
The performers of this song are:

- Team S: Inuzuka Asana, Takeuchi Mai, Tsuzuki Rika
- Team KII: Takagi Yumana
- Team E: Kimoto Kanon, Sakai Mei, Shibata Aya

=== "ii Hito ii Hito Sagi" ===
"ii Hito ii Hito Sagi" was performed by the SKE48 grouping Yanchana Tenshi to Yasashi Akuma, consisting of:

- Team S: Goto Risako, Sugiyama Aika, Nojima Kano, Yakata Miki, Yamada Juna
- Team S Draftee: Isshiki Rena, Kamimura Ayuka
- Team KII: Aoki Shiori, Ishida Anna, Uchiyama Mikoto, Obata Yuna, Shirai Kotono, Takatsuka Natsuki, Matsumura Kaori
- Team KII Draftee: Mizuno Airi
- Team E: Ida Reona, Sugawara Maya
- Trainee: Aikawa Honoka, Asai Yuka, Ota Ayaka, Kataoka Narumi, Kawasaki Narumi, Suenaga Oka, Takahata Yuki, Machi Otoha, Murai Junna, Wada Aina

=== "Kon'ya wa Shake it!" ===
Kon'ya wa Shake it! was performed by Love Crescendo.

== Release history ==
Region	Date	Format	Label
Japan	August 17, 2016	CD; digital download; streaming	Avex
South Korea	August 22, 2016 (Type A) August 23, 2016 (Type B) August 24, 2016 (Type C) August 25, 2016 (Type D)	digital download; streaming	SM; iriver
