= Sansei Kawaii! =

2013 single by SKE48

- Type A cover

Single by SKE48
- Released: November 20, 2013 (Japan)
- Genre: J-pop
- Label: Avex Trax
- Songwriter: Yasushi Akimoto (lyrics)
- Producer: Yasushi Akimoto

SKE48 singles chronology
"Utsukushii Inazuma" (2013)	"Sansei Kawaii!" (2013)	"Mirai to wa?" (2014)

Music video
- Sansei Kawaii! (Special edit ver.) on YouTube

Sansei Kawaii! (賛成カワイイ!) is the 13th single by Japanese girl group SKE48, released in Japan on November 20, 2013.

== Track listing ==
=== TYPE-A ===
CD
No.	Title	Artist(s)	Length
1.	"Sansei Kawaii!" (賛成カワイイ！)
2.	"Koko de Ippatsu" (ここで一発)	Dasu & Tsuma
3.	"Michi wa Naze Tsuzuku no ka?" (道は なぜ続くのか？)	Aichi Toyota Senbatsu
4.	"Zutto Zutto Saki no Kyou" (ずっとずっと先の今日)	Selection 18
5.	"Sansei Kawaii! (Off vocal)"
6.	"Koko de Ippatsu (Off vocal)"
7.	"Michi wa Naze Tsuzuku no ka? (Off vocal)"
8.	"Zutto Zutto Saki no Kyou (Off vocal)"

DVD
No.	Title	Length
1.	"Sansei Kawaii! (Music Video)"
2.	"Koko de Ippatsu (Music Video)"
3.	"Bonus I"

=== TYPE-B ===
CD
No.	Title	Artist(s)	Length
1.	"Sansei Kawaii!" (賛成カワイイ！)
2.	"Itsunomanika, Yowaimonoijime" (いつのまにか、弱い者いじめ)	Selection 8
3.	"Michi wa Naze Tsuzuku no ka?" (道は なぜ続くのか？)	Aichi Toyota Senbatsu
4.	"Zutto Zutto Saki no Kyou" (ずっとずっと先の今日)	Selection 18
5.	"Sansei Kawaii! (Off vocal)"
6.	"Itsunomanika, Yowaimonoijime (Off vocal)"
7.	"Michi wa Naze Tsuzuku no ka? (Off vocal)"
8.	"Zutto Zutto Saki no Kyou (Off vocal)"

DVD
No.	Title	Length
1.	"Sansei Kawaii! (Music Video)"
2.	"Itsunomanika, Yowaimonoijime (Music Video)"
3.	"Bonus II"

=== TYPE-C ===
CD
No.	Title	Artist(s)	Length
1.	"Sansei Kawaii!" (賛成カワイイ！)
2.	"Canaria Syndrome" (カナリアシンドローム)	Shirogumi
3.	"Michi wa Naze Tsuzuku no ka?" (道は なぜ続くのか？)	Aichi Toyota Senbatsu
4.	"Zutto Zutto Saki no Kyou" (ずっとずっと先の今日)	Selection 18
5.	"Sansei Kawaii! (Off vocal)"
6.	"Canaria Syndrome (Off vocal)"
7.	"Michi wa Naze Tsuzuku no ka? (Off vocal)"
8.	"Zutto Zutto Saki no Kyou (Off vocal)"

DVD
No.	Title	Length
1.	"Sansei Kawaii! (Music Video)"
2.	"Canaria Syndrome (Music Video)"
3.	"Bonus III"

=== TYPE-D ===
CD
No.	Title	Artist(s)	Length
1.	"Sansei Kawaii!" (賛成カワイイ！)
2.	"Zakuro no Miwa Yuutsu ga Nantsubu Tsumatte Iru?" (石榴の実は憂鬱が何粒詰まっている?)	Akagumi
3.	"Michi wa Naze Tsuzuku no ka?" (道は なぜ続くのか？)	Aichi Toyota Senbatsu
4.	"Zutto Zutto Saki no Kyou" (ずっとずっと先の今日)	Selection 18
5.	"Sansei Kawaii! (Off vocal)"
6.	"Zakuro no Miwa Yuutsu ga Nantsubu Tsumatte Iru? (Off vocal)"
7.	"Michi wa Naze Tsuzuku no ka? (Off vocal)"
8.	"Zutto Zutto Saki no Kyou (Off vocal)"

DVD
No.	Title	Length
1.	"Sansei Kawaii! (Music Video)"
2.	"Zakuro no Miwa Yuutsu ga Nantsubu Tsumatte Iru? (Music Video)"
3.	"Bonus IV"

=== Theater Edition ===
CD
No.	Title	Artist(s)	Length
1.	"Sansei Kawaii!" (賛成カワイイ！)
2.	"Michi wa Naze Tsuzuku no ka?" (道は なぜ続くのか？)	Aichi Toyota Senbatsu
3.	"Zutto Zutto Saki no Kyou" (ずっとずっと先の今日)	Selection 18
4.	"SKE48 13th Single Medley"
5.	"Sansei Kawaii! (Off vocal)"
6.	"Michi wa Naze Tsuzuku no ka? (Off vocal)"
7.	"Zutto Zutto Saki no Kyou (Off vocal)"

== Personnel ==
=== "Sansei Kawaii!" ===
Center: Jurina Matsui, Rena Matsui

- Team S: Anna Ishida, Masana Ōya, Yuria Kizaki, Yūka Nakanishi, Jurina Matsui, Manatsu Mukaida
- Team KII: Mina Ōba, Aya Shibata, Akari Suda, Akane Takayanagi, Airi Furukawa
- Team E: Kanon Kimoto, Nanako Suga, Nao Furuhata, Rena Matsui
- Kenkyūsei: Ryoha Kitagawa

=== "Koko de Ippatsu" ===
Performed by Dasu & Tsuma

- Team KII: Akari Suda
- Kenkyūsei: Kaori Matsumura

=== "Michi wa Naze Tsuzuku no ka?" ===
Performed by Aichi Toyota Senbatsu

- Team S: Masana Ōya, Yuria Kizaki, Jurina Matsui, Manatsu Mukaida
- Team KII: Aya Shibata, Akari Suda, Akane Takayanagi, Airi Furukawa
- Team E: Kanon Kimoto, Nao Furuhata, Rena Matsui
- Kenkyūusei: Kitagawa Ryōha

=== "Zutto Zutto Saki no Kyou" ===
Performed by Selection 18

- Team S: Kyoka Isohara, Masana Ōya, Yuria Kizaki, Makiko Saitō, Yūka Nakanishi, Jurina Matsui
- Team KII: Mina Ōba, Ami Kobayashi, Aya Shibata, Akari Suda, Akane Takayanagi, Airi Furukawa, Rina Matsumoto
- Team E: Madoka Umemoto, Shiori Kaneko, Kanon Kimoto, Rena Matsui
- Kenkyūsei: Matsumura Kaori

=== "Itsunomanika, Yowaimonoijime" ===
Performed by Selection 8

- Team S: Yuna Ego, Niidoi Sayaka
- Team KII: Futamura Haruka
- Team E: Rion Azuma, Ichino Narumi, Iwanaga Tsugumi, Mizuno Honoka, Miyamae Ami

=== "Canaria Syndrome" ===
Performed by Shirogumi

- Team S: Riho Abiru, Kyoka Isohara, Risako Gotō, Makiko Saitō, Rika Tsuzuki
- Team KII: Mikoto Uchiyama, Tomoko Katō, Ami Kobayashi, Mieko Satō, Rina Matsumoto
- Team E: Mei Sakai, Reika Yamada
- Kenkyūsei: Asana Inuzuka, Risa Ogino, Ruka Kitano, Yuna Kitahara

=== "Zakuro no Miwa Yuutsu ga Nantsubu Tsumatte Iru?" ===
Performed by Akagumi

- Team S: Seira Satō, Aki Deguchi, Miki Yakata
- Team KII: Rumi Katō, Yumana Takagi, Mai Takeuchi, Yukari Yamashita, Mizuho Yamada
- Team E: Shiori Iguchi, Madoka Umemoto, Shiori Kaneko, Momona Kito, Yukiko Kinoshita
- Kenkyūsei: Shiori Aoki, Arisa Ōwaki, Haruka Kumazaki

== Charts ==
=== Billboard charts ===
Chart (2013)	Peak position
Japan (Japan Hot 100)	1

=== Oricon charts ===
Release	Oricon Singles Chart	Peak position	Debut sales (copies)	Sales total (copies)
November 20, 2013	Daily Chart	1	349,835	418,368
November 20, 2013	Weekly Chart	1		418,368

== Release history ==
Date	Version	Catalog	Format	Label
November 20, 2013	Type-A	Limited Edition (AVCD-48845/B); Regular Edition (AVCD-48849/B)	CD+DVD	Avex
November 20, 2013	Type-B	Limited Edition (AVCD-48846/B); Regular Edition (AVCD-48850/B)	CD+DVD	Avex
November 20, 2013	Type-C	Limited Edition (AVCD-48847/B); Regular Edition (AVCD-48851/B)	CD+DVD	Avex
November 20, 2013	Type-D	Limited Edition (AVCD-48848/B); Regular Edition (AVCD-48852/B)	CD+DVD	Avex
November 20, 2013	Theater	Regular Version (AVC1-48853)	CD	Avex

== CGM48 version ==
"เธออะ Kawaii! (Sansei Kawaii!)"

Single by CGM48
- A-side: "Sansei Kawaii!"
- B-side: "Yume wa Nigenai"; "Hotei Sokudo to Yuuetsukan"
- Released: 2023
- Genre: T-pop
- Label: iAM

CGM48 singles chronology
"2565" (2022)	"เธออะ Kawaii! (Sansei Kawaii!)" (2023)

The Thai idol group CGM48, a sister group of AKB48, covered the song with the same title. It is their sixth single to be released in the first half of 2023.

=== Track listing ===
- **Bold** indicates centers.

No.	Title	Performers	Length
1.	"Sansei Kawaii! (Thai: เธออะ Kawaii!)" (A cover of SKE48's "Sansei Kawaii!")	Team C: Angel, Aom, Champoo, Fortune, Kaiwan, Kaning, Marmink, **Nenie**, **Pim**, Punch, Sita; Trainee: Jingjing, Lookked, Mei, Nana, Twobam
2.	"Yume wa Nigenai (Thai: จะไม่หนีจากความฝัน)" (A cover of NMB48's "Yume wa Nigenai")	2nd Generation Trainee: Emma, Ginna, **Jingjing**, Lookked, Nana, Papang, Twobam
3.	"Hotei Sokudo to Yuuetsukan (Thai: ซิ่งให้สุด...หยุดที่เธอ)" (A cover of AKB48's "Hotei Sokudo to Yuuetsukan")	Team C: Angel, Aom, Champoo, Fortune, Kaiwan, Kaning, Marmink, Nenie, Pim, Punch, **Sita**; Trainee: Jingjing, Lookked, Mei, Nana, Twobam
4.	"Sansei Kawaii!" (off vocal version)
5.	"Yume wa Nigenai" (off vocal version)
6.	"Hotei Sokudo to Yuuetsukan" (off vocal version)		5:31
