= Rika Hoshimi =

Japanese AV idol, gravure model and actress

- 星美りか
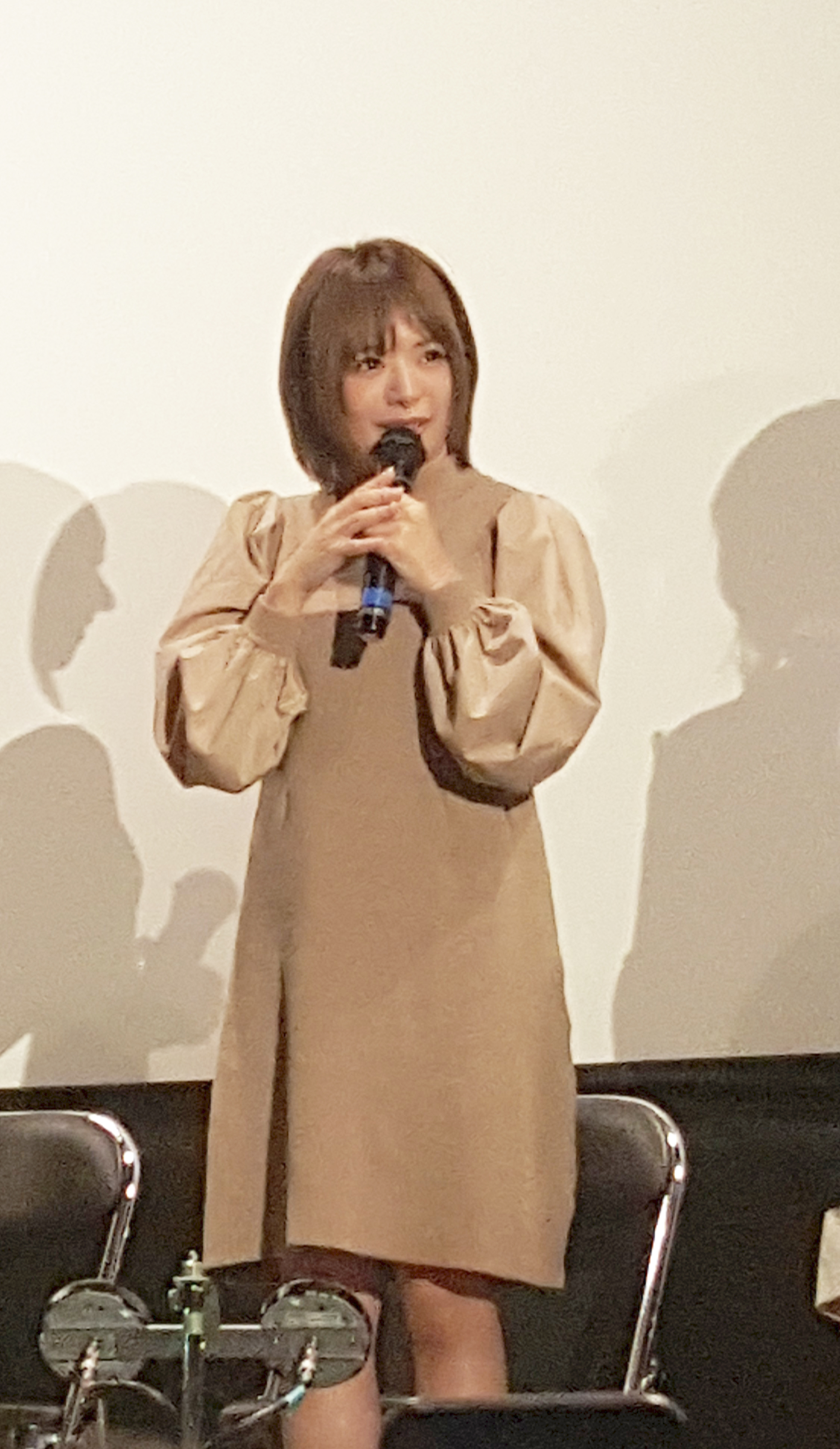
- Rika Hoshimi in 2019
- Born: 20 September 1990 (age 35); Numazu, Shizuoka, Japan
- Years active: 2011 – 2016
- Height: 150 cm (4 ft 11 in)

Rika Hoshimi (Japanese: 星美りか, Hepburn: Hoshimi Rika) is a Japanese former AV idol, gravure model and actress.

== Life and career ==
Hoshimi was born on September 20, 1990, in Numazu, Shizuoka, Japan. She was first active as a centerfold model, and she debuted on video in May 2010 with the gravure (non-nude) release Emanechio (エマネチオ), which was filmed in Bali.

In September 2011 she switched from gravure modeling to the adult video (AV) industry, debuting in AV Decision, released by Muteki, a label specializing in celebrities making their adult video debuts. Four months later she debuted at the studio Idea Pocket with First Impression Rika Hoshimi, directed by Tadanori Usami, released on January 1, 2012. She became an exclusive actress for the studio between 2012 and 2014. She also appeared in IP PLATINUM GIRLS COLLECTION 2012, released on November 19, 2012. The film shows Hoshimi partaking in a special photo session in America organized by the studio and accompanied by other famous AV actresses signed under Idea Pocket including Kaho Kasumi, Jessica Kizaki, Rio, Aino Kishi, Minori Hatsune and Emiri Okazaki.

In 2013 Hoshimi starred in the Haruhi Oguri's youth-oriented drama film Bad Communication. She also appeared in several other films like Schoolgirl Blackboard Jungle and Undressing Mahjong Gakuen Z On April 19, 2014, she starred in her last AV with Idea Pocket Gang Bang Rika Hoshimi. She transferred to veteran AV studio K.M. Produce and debuted on June 13, 2014, with Hyper Super Star Rika Hoshimi, directed by Zack Arai. Hoshimi remained an exclusive performer for K.M. Produce for the next two years, appearing along with the studio's other actresses Sakura Kizuna, Yuu Aisaka and Miko Sakasaki in Million Dream 2014 Absolute Body Battle Ikamon and "Ika" Se Great Battle Special where the four girls perform in a large variety of situations and costumes. She also starred in the AV Best Blend 6 where she performed her first (and only) girl-on-girl scene with Sakura Kizuna. She appeared in several VR releases as well.

Hoshimi retired from the AV industry at the end of 2016. Her last film, Retirement Rika Hoshimi, directed by Tiger Kosakai was released on December 9, 2016. The film is notable for being shot in documentary style of Hoshimi taking a trip to Thailand while also engaging in sexual activity. Despite her retirement from AV, she remained active on social media.

== Filmography ==
=== Films ===
- BAD communication (2013)
- Schoolgirl Blackboard Jungle (2013)
- Mysterious Gaia Sentai Ranger (2013)
- High and Low (Datsui-mâjan gakuen Z) (2013)
- Sister of Summer (2014)

=== Gravure Videos ===
- Emanechio (E-Net Frontier, May 21, 2010)
- Living with Africa (Air Control, July 25, 2010)
- Approaching (Air Control, September 25, 2010)

=== Adult Videos ===
- AV Decision (Muteki, September 2011)
- First Impression (Idea Pocket, January 2012)
- Beautiful idol star Rika (Idea Pocket, February 2012)
- Squid Comfortably Star (Idea Pocket, March 2012)
- Let's at school! (Idea Pocket, April 2012)

=== Television ===
- Please! Index (Asahi TV)
- Talk gravure audition (Fuji TV)
- Gyarusa (NTV)
- Girls On Film (MONDO21)
- BONZO big advance TV!! (TOKYO MX/MONDO21)
- Ani rub Chao (TV Tsukuba)
- PE time (TV Tsukuba)
- SHAKE! FREE TV (Aichi, TOKYO MX, Kyushu Broadcasting TVQ)
- Rank Kingdom (TBS)
- Peach Whisper (MONDO21)

== Works ==
=== Photo Books ===
- STARIKA (July 2011, photographed by: K. Yamaguchi), ISBN 9784575303384
- ＊ asterisk (September 2012, photographed by: Nogawa Isamu), ISBN 9784775605240

=== Magazines ===
- Young Jump "Schoolgirl Uniform national collection" (Shueisha)
- Young Magazine "Girls BUTA fine black" (Kodansha)
- SPA! (Fuso)
