= Utsukushii Inazuma =

- Type A cover

Single by SKE48
- B-side: "Jyuri-Jyuri Baby" (Type-A); "Through the Night" (Type-A); "Futari dake no Parade" (Type-B); "Seishun no Mizushibuki" (Type-B); "Shalala na Calendar" (Type-C); "Band wo Yarou yo" (Type-C); "Yuudachi no Mae" (Theater Edition)
- Released: July 17, 2013 (Japan)
- Genre: J-pop
- Label: avex trax
- Songwriters: Yasushi Akimoto, Takashi Fukuda
- Producer: Yasushi Akimoto

SKE48 singles chronology
"Choco no Dorei" (2013)	"Utsukushii Inazuma" (2013)	"Sansei Kawaii!" (2013)

Utsukushii Inazuma (美しい稲妻) is the 12th single by Japanese girl group SKE48, released in Japan on July 17, 2013.

== Track listing ==
=== Type-A ===
CD
No.	Title	Artist(s)	Length
1.	"Utsukushii Inazuma" (美しい稲妻)
2.	"Jyuri-Jyuri Baby"	Team S
3.	"Through the Night" (スルー・ザ・ナイト)	Selection 8
4.	"Utsukushii Inazuma (Off vocal)"
5.	"Jyuri-Jyuri Baby (Off vocal)"
6.	"Through the Night (Off vocal)"

DVD
No.	Title	Length
1.	"Utsukushii Inazuma (Music Video)"
2.	"Jyuri-Jyuri Baby (Music Video)"
3.	"SKE48 Team Taikou! Inazuma! Gachi Cooking Battle Part 1"

=== Type-B ===
CD
No.	Title	Artist(s)	Length
1.	"Utsukushii Inazuma" (美しい稲妻)
2.	"Futari dake no Parade" (2人だけのパレード)	Team KII
3.	"Seishun no Mizushibuki" (青春の水しぶき)	Boat Pier Senbatsu
4.	"Utsukushii Inazuma (Off vocal)"
5.	"Futari dake no Parade (Off vocal)"
6.	"Seishun no Mizushibuki (Off vocal)"

DVD
No.	Title	Length
1.	"Utsukushii Inazuma (Music Video)"
2.	"Futari dake no Parade (Music Video)"
3.	"SKE48 Team Taikou! Inazuma! Gachi Cooking Battle Part 2"

=== Type-C ===
CD
No.	Title	Artist(s)	Length
1.	"Utsukushii Inazuma" (美しい稲妻)
2.	"Shalala na Calendar" (シャララなカレンダー)	Team E
3.	"Band wo Yarou yo" (バンドをやろうよ)	Magical Band
4.	"Utsukushii Inazuma (Off vocal)"
5.	"Shalala na Calendar (Off vocal)"
6.	"Band wo Yarou yo (Off vocal)"

DVD
No.	Title	Length
1.	"Utsukushii Inazuma (Music Video)"
2.	"Shalala na Calendar (Music Video)"
3.	"SKE48 Team Taikou! Inazuma! Gachi Cooking Battle Part 3"

=== Theater Edition ===
CD
No.	Title	Artist(s)	Length
1.	"Utsukushii Inazuma" (美しい稲妻)
2.	"Yuudachi no Mae" (夕立の前)	Kenkyūsei
3.	"12th single medley"
4.	"Utsukushii Inazuma (Off vocal)"
5.	"Yuudachi no Mae (Off vocal)"

== Member ==
=== "Utsukushii Inazuma" ===
(Center: Jurina Matsui, Rena Matsui)

- Team S: Anna Ishida, Masana Ōya, Yuria Kizaki, Sayaka Niidoi, Jurina Matsui, Manatsu Mukaida, Miki Yakata
- Team KII: Mina Ōba, Akari Suda, Akane Takayanagi, Airi Furukawa
- Team E: Yukiko Kinoshita, Kanon Kimoto, Nanako Suga, Nao Furuhata, Rena Matsui

=== "Jyuri-Jyuri Baby" ===
Team S

- Team S: Riho Abiru, Anna Ishida, Kyōka Isohara, Yūna Ego, Masana Ōya, Yuria Kizaki, Risako Gotō, Makiko Saitō, Seira Satō, Rika Tsuzuki, Aki Deguchi, Yūka Nakanishi, Sayaka Niidoi, Jurina Matsui, Manatsu Mukaida, Miki Yakata

=== "Through the Night" ===
Selection 8

- Team S: Seira Satō, Aki Deguchi
- Team KII: Mai Takeuchi, Haruka Futamura
- Team E: Tsugumi Iwanaga, Shiori Kaneko, Momona Kitō, Nanako Suga

=== "Futari dake no Parade" ===
Team KII

- Team KII: Mikoto Uchiyama, Tomoko Katō, Rumi Katō, Mina Ōba, Ami Kobayashi, Mieko Satō, Aya Shibata, Akari Suda, Yumana Takagi, Akane Takayanagi, Mai Takeuchi, Haruka Futamura, Airi Furukawa, Rina Matsumoto, Yukari Yamashita

=== "Seishun no Mizushibuki" ===
Boat Pier Senbatsu

- Team S: Masana Ōya, Miki Yakata
- Team KII: Akari Suda, Akane Takayanagi, Airi Furukawa
- Team E: Rena Matsui
- Kenkyūsei: Matsumura Kaori

=== "Shalala na Calendar" ===
Team E

- Team E: Rion Azuma, Shiori Iguchi, Narumi Ichino, Tsugumi Iwanaga, Madoka Umemoto, Shiori Kaneko, Momona Kitō, Yukiko Kinoshita, Kanon Kimoto, Mei Sakai, Nanako Suga, Nao Furuhata, Rena Matsui, Honoka Mizuno, Ami Miyamae, Reika Yamada

=== "Band wo Yarou yo" ===
Magical Band

- Team S: Yuria Kizaki
- Team KII: Akane Takayanagi
- Team E: Kanon Kimoto
- AKB48 Team K: Rie Kitahara
- Former members: Shiori Ogiso, Sawako Hata, Kumi Yagami

=== "Yuudachi no Mae" ===
Kenkyūsei

- Kenkyūsei: Kaori Matsumura, Asana Inuzuka, Arisa Ōwaki, Risa Ogino, Mizuho Yamada, Aoki Shiori, Reona Ida, Akane Ito, Aisa Orito, Natsuki Kamata, Ryōha Kitagawa, Ruka Kitano, Yuna Kitahara, Haruka Kumazaki, Mayuko Gotō, Yuka Sasaki, Miyuka Sora, Saki Takeuchi, Yume Noguchi, Yuzuki Hidaka, Azuki Yano, Juna Yamada, Yuka Yamamoto

== Oricon Charts ==
Release	Oricon Singles Chart	Peak position	Debut sales (copies)	Sales total (copies)
July 17, 2013	Daily Chart	1	416,341	659,542
July 17, 2013	Weekly Chart	1	510,673	659,542
July 17, 2013	Monthly Chart			659,542
