= SKE48 =

Japanese idol group

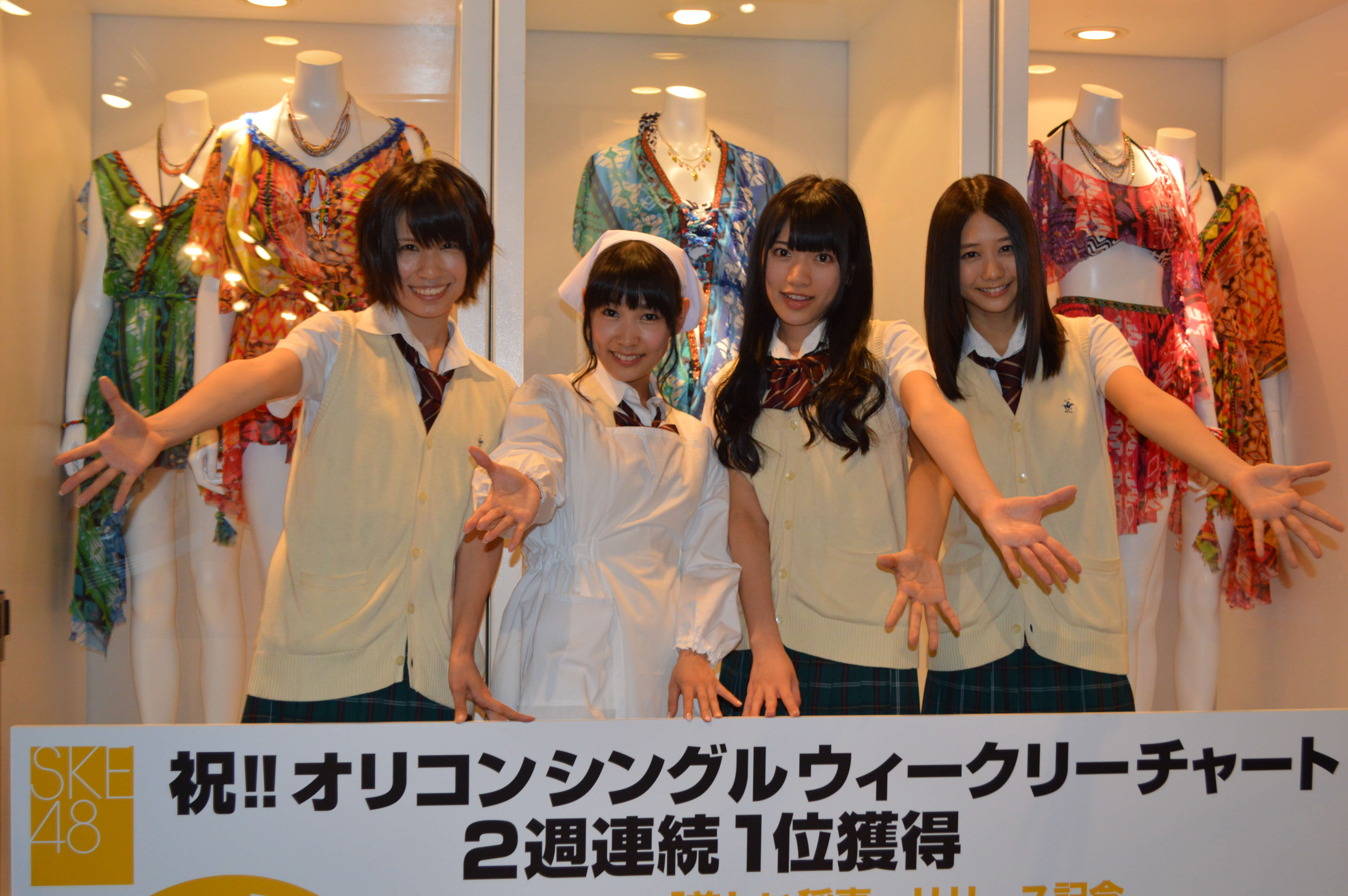

Background information
- Origin: Nagoya, Japan
- Genres: J-pop; teen pop; bubblegum pop
- Years active: 2008–present
- Labels: Nippon Crown; Lantis; Avex Group; Zest; SKE Inc.
- Member of: AKB48 Group
- Members: Team S Details; Team KII Details; Team E Details
- Website: ske48.co.jp

SKE48 (S.K.E. Forty-eight) is a Japanese idol group produced by Yasushi Akimoto. SKE48 is named after the Sakae district in Nagoya of Aichi Prefecture, where the group is based. The group performs at SKE48 Theater on 2F of Sunshine Sakae, a shopping center in Sakae, Nagoya. Avex Group is its current official label. The group has sold nearly 11 million CDs in Japan.

== Concept ==
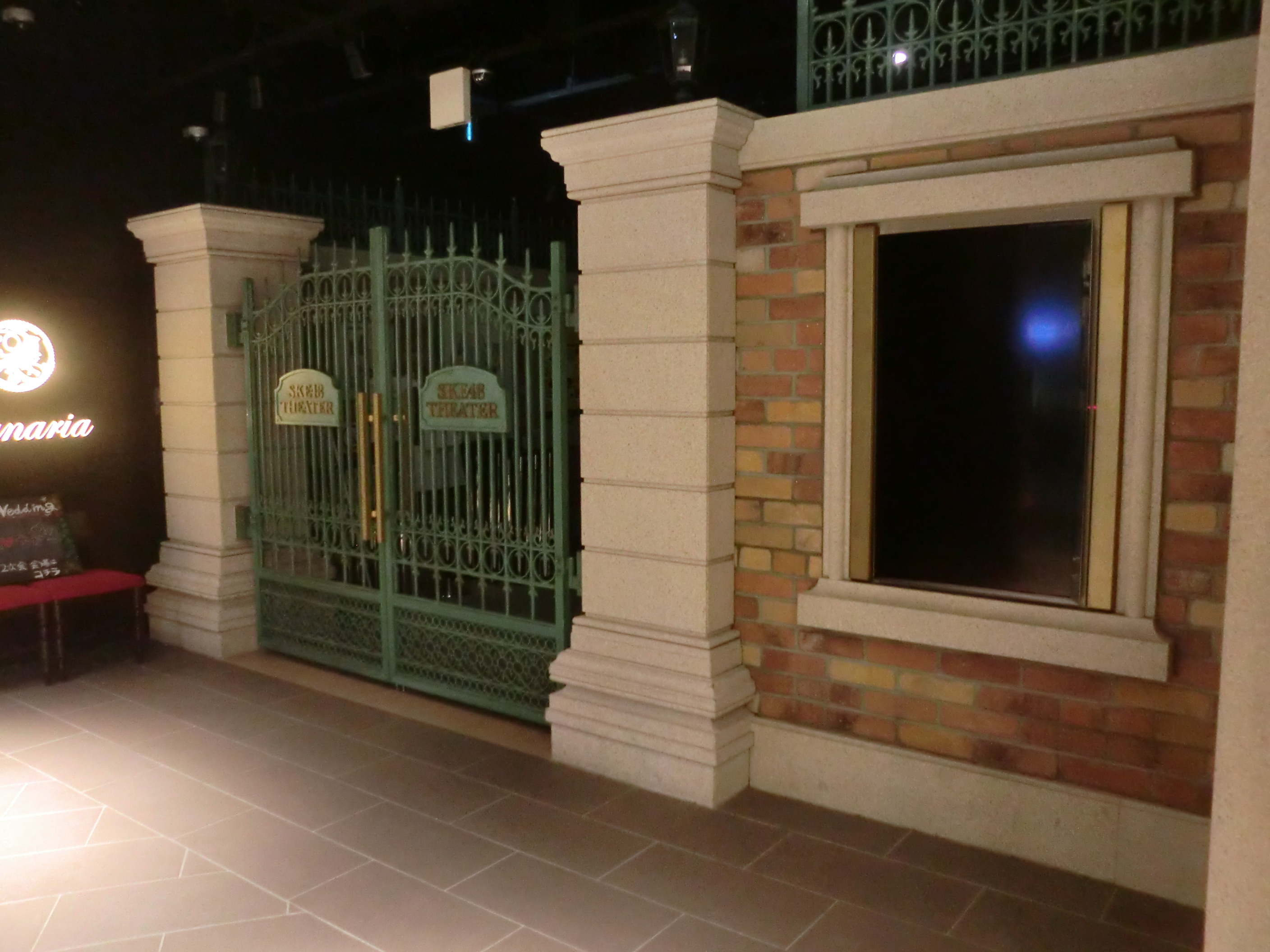
Entrance of SKE48 Theater

SKE48 was founded based on the concept of "idols you can meet". The group's chief producer Yasushi Akimoto once said that his aim was to create an idol group that is unlike any other ordinary idol groups (who only give occasional concerts and are mostly seen on TV). SKE48 would perform in its own theater regularly, and fans would always be able to watch the girls performing live. The SKE48 Theater is in the Sunshine Sakae of Nagoya, Aichi. Members of this group are dispatched into three groups, chronologically named "Team S", "Team KII" and "Team E". Kenkyūsei (trainees) is the group of members training to be promoted into one of these teams.

== History ==
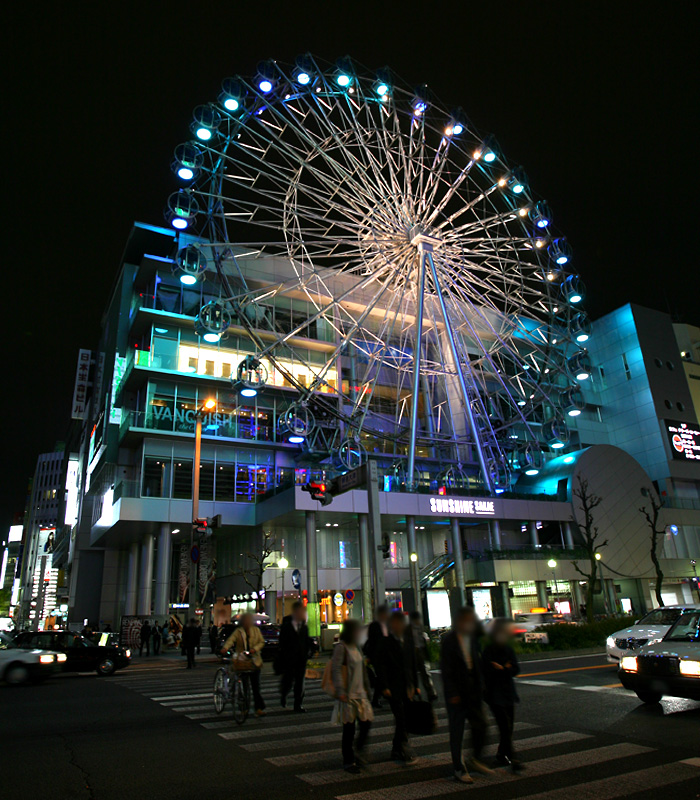
Sunshine Sakae

Yasushi Akimoto was offered the chance to start a production in Nagoya along with the renewal of the Sunshine Sakae 2F, when he was thinking of expanding his "48 project" nationwide. He had offers from outside Japan, but he decided to use Nagoya as the place to move on with the project. Akimoto said that selected members from AKB48 and SKE48 may release a single together. They released their first single in 2009.

In AKB48's single "Ōgoe Diamond", Jurina Matsui became the center and the first and only member of SKE48 to be featured on a single cover and in the song itself. Including Matsui, some members of SKE48 have appeared in the PV, marking the first collaboration made by the two groups so far.

On May 28, 2011, Avex picked up SKE48 and were to release their debut single under the label called "Pareo wa Emerald" on July 27, 2011.

On August 25, it was announced that SKE48 member Yui Matsushita would leave the group at the end of September 2011 due to ankle injuries.

On August 7, 2012, SKE48 member and captain of Team S, Hirata Rikako announced her graduation to pursue a career as a reporter.

On the first day of the Tokyo Dome Concert held on August 24, 2012, it was announced that Rie Kitahara of AKB48, Team K would hold a concurrent position in SKE48. Anna Ishida of Team KII would hold a concurrent position in AKB48, Team B.

On November 1, it was announced that Kumi Yagami, one of the group's first generation members, would graduate but the date was not announced.

On December 9, SKE48CAFE&SHOP with AKB48 was opened to the building 5F with a theater. There is a cooking menu that the members of SKE48 devised.

On January 15, 2013, it was announced that eight members, three from Team S, two each from Team KII and E, and one kenkyusei, would graduate from the group, along with Yagami (whose graduation was already announced in November 2012) sometime in the spring 2013. On April 13, it was announced that teams were to be reorganized and nine kenkyusei members would be promoted to full members. Yuka Nakanishi became the captain of SKE48 as well as leader of Team S, and Rena Matsui was promoted to leader of Team E. Rie Kitahara, who was in both SKE48 and AKB48, was removed from SKE48's lineup during the final concert of "AKB48 Group Rinji Soukai" concert series at the Nippon Budokan on 28 April, with her final theater performance as a SKE48 member on May 9.

On February 24, 2014, it was announced that Rena Matsui would hold a concurrent position with Nogizaka46 after teams were reorganized and kenkyusei members were promoted to full members. Concurrent member with SKE48 and AKB48 Mina Ōba was fully transferred to SKE48 Team KII and other members from AKB48, NMB48, and HKT48 were permanently transferred or given concurrent positions in SKE48. Former Team K member Miyazawa Sae was transferred from SNH48 and appointed the new leader of Team S.

On March 15, 2015, the members who passed the seventh generation audition were revealed. On June 6, 2015, SKE48 became the first sister group to have more members rank in the annual Single Senbatsu Sousenkyo than AKB48. In 2015, SKE48 released two singles. A third release was published under the label "Love Crescendo" and was promoted as SKE48's first sub project.

On March 11, 2016, 2 members of SKE48 members Yuria Kizaki and Kanon Kimoto voiced in the Live action Anime film Shimajiro in Bookland.

On February 7, 2020, Jurina Matsui announced her graduation from SKE48. In July 2020, Kazuya Ebine, an executive from SKE48's managing company Zest, was arrested for allegedly paying two underage girls to have sex in his car in November 2019.

In September 2025, SKE48 was officially appointed as the 2026 Asian Games supporters in Aichi-Nagoya.

== Members ==
=== Team S ===
Team S is associated with the color yellow, the current leader is Honoka Aikawa and the vice-leader is Haruka Kumazaki.

Name	Birth date (age)	generation	Election rank									
Name	Birth date (age)	generation	1	2	3	4	5	6	7	8	9	10
Honoka Aikawa (相川暖花, Aikawa Honoka)	October 22, 2003 (age 23)	7th							N/A	N/A	N/A	N/A
Yuzuki Ishiguro (石黒友月, Ishiguro Yuzuki)	October 11, 2003 (age 23)	8th									N/A	N/A
Kokomi Itō (伊藤虹々美, Itō Kokomi)	December 8, 2008 (age 17)	12th										
Sayaka Iriuchijima (入内嶋涼, Iriuchijima Sayaka)	May 13, 1999 (age 27)	9th										
Haruka Kumazaki (熊崎晴香, Kumazaki Haruka)	August 10, 1997 (age 29)	6th					N/A	N/A	73	67	63	46
Ami Kurashima (倉島杏実, Kurashima Ami)	June 28, 2005 (age 21)	8th									N/A	N/A
Tsubaki Kuwahara (桒原椿, Kuwahara Tsubaki)	February 25, 2006 (age 20)	13th										
Marin Sakamoto (坂本真凛, Sakamoto Marin)	February 2, 2002 (age 24)	8th									N/A	N/A
Riina Sugimoto (杉本りいな, Sugimoto Riina)	September 20, 2008 (age 18)	11th										
Kokona Suzuki (鈴木恋奈, Suzuki Kokona)	December 28, 2003 (age 22)	9th										
Miyo Nomura (野村実代, Nomura Miyo)	February 1, 2003 (age 23)	8th									N/A	N/A
Yūne Hara (原優寧, Hara Yūne)	November 23, 2001 (age 24)	11th										
Miyu Matsukawa (松川みゆ, Matsukawa Miyu)	April 15, 2008 (age 18)	12th										
Coco Minamisawa (南澤恋々, Minamisawa Coco)	October 26, 2007 (age 19)	12th										
Sakura Yamamura (山村さくら, Yamamura Sakura)	September 20, 2006 (age 20)	11th										

=== Team KII ===
Team KII is associated with the color red, the current leader is Miki Itō and the vice leader is Natsuki Kamata.

Name	Birth date (age)	generation	Election rank									
Name	Birth date (age)	generation	1	2	3	4	5	6	7	8	9	10
Himeka Arano (荒野姫楓, Arano Himeka)	January 9, 2002 (age 24)	9th										
Miki Itō (伊藤実希, Itō Miki)	August 11, 2002 (age 24)	10th										
Ruka Inoue (井上瑠夏, Inoue Ruka)	June 12, 2001 (age 25)	8th									N/A	N/A
Kokoha Okuno (奥野心羽, Okuno Kokoha)	February 20, 2005 (age 21)	12th										
Natsuki Kamata (鎌田菜月, Kamata Natsuki)	August 29, 1996 (age 30)	6th					N/A	N/A	70	74	44	59
Yoshino Kitagawa (北川愛乃, Kitagawa Yoshino)	January 24, 2001 (age 25)	8th									N/A	N/A
Hana kuramoto (倉本羽菜, kuramoto Hana)	September 13, 2004 (age 22)	12th										
Sana Kumoi (雲井紗菜, Kumoi Sana)	November 23, 2005 (age 20)	13th										
Mikoto Kondō (近藤海琴, Kondō Mikoto)	November 25, 2003 (age 22)	13th										
Kaho Satō (佐藤佳穂, Satō Kaho)	May 16, 1997 (age 29)	8th									N/A	N/A
Kyōka Shinohara (篠原京香, Shinohara Kyōka)	June 3, 2004 (age 22)	11th										
Chikako Matsumoto (松本慈子, Matsumoto Chikako)	November 19, 1999 (age 27)	D1st						N/A	N/A	N/A	N/A	N/A

=== Team E ===
Team E is associated with the color light sea green, the current leader is Kimie Akahori and Rika Aoki as the vice-leader.

Name	Birth date (age)	generation	Election rank									
Name	Birth date (age)	generation	1	2	3	4	5	6	7	8	9	10
Rika Aoki (青木莉樺, Aoki Rika)	December 2, 1999 (age 26)	10th										
Kimie Akahori (赤堀君江, Akahori Kimie)	January 21, 2002 (age 24)	9th										
Yūka Asai (浅井裕華, Asai Yūka)	November 10, 2003 (age 23)	7th							N/A	N/A	N/A	N/A
Reona Ida (井田玲音名, Ida Reona)	December 3, 1998 (age 27)	6th					N/A	N/A	N/A	N/A	N/A	N/A
Ayaka Ōta (太田彩夏, Ōta Ayaka)	August 17, 2000 (age 26)	7th							N/A	N/A	N/A	N/A
Manae Ōta (太田愛恵, Ōta Manae)	December 16, 2007 (age 18)	13th										
Anzu Ōmura (大村杏, Ōmura Anzu)	September 20, 2005 (age 21)	11th										
Yua kawamura (河村優愛, kawamura Yua)	January 31, 2006 (age 20)	12th										
Ena Suzuki (鈴木愛菜, Suzuki Ena)	January 9, 2004 (age 22)	9th										
Miyu Nakasaka (中坂美祐, Nakasaka Miyu)	June 11, 2005 (age 21)	9th										
Izumi Nakamura (仲村和泉, Nakamura Izumi)	March 15, 2000 (age 26)	8th									N/A	N/A
Mio Nishii (西井美桜, Nishii Mio)	March 16, 2001 (age 25)	10th										
Miyabi Hasegawa (長谷川雅, Hasegawa Miyabi)	November 20, 2010 (age 15)	12th										
Kurumi Morimoto (森本くるみ, Morimoto Kurumi)	September 3, 2007 (age 19)	11th										

=== Kenkyuusei ===
Name	Birth date (age)	generation
Saya Takamura (高村紗弥, Takamura Saya)	July 4, 2004 (age 22)	12th
Syōko Kawamura (川村昇子, Kawamura Syōko)	September 15, 2007 (age 19)	13th
Rei Kubota (久保田怜, Kubota Rei)	November 23, 2009 (age 16)	13th
Nozomi Sasaki (佐々木希美, Sasaki Nozomi)	October 19, 2010 (age 16)	13th
Ayame Tachibana (立花菖, Tachibana Ayame)	June 24, 2009 (age 17)	13th
Mayu Tamura (田村真悠, Tamura Mayu)	September 18, 2007 (age 19)	13th
Haruka Hijiri (聖遥花, Hijiri Haruka)	February 4, 2007 (age 19)	13th
Rinka Miyamoto (宮本倫花, Miyamoto Rinka)	September 10, 2007 (age 19)	13th
Shiho Yokoi (横井志穂, Yokoi Shiho)	November 8, 2011 (age 15)	13th
Yura Iida (飯田ゆら, Iida Yura)	July 4, 2012 (age 14)	14th
Arisa Ikeda (池田有沙, Ikeda Arisa)	August 25, 2011 (age 15)	14th
Marika Takeshita (竹下茉莉花, Takeshita Marika)	December 17, 2005 (age 20)	14th
Fuka Nakao (中尾楓華, Nakao Fuka)	January 17, 2007 (age 19)	14th
Nagi Yajima (矢島凪, Yajima Nagi)	September 9, 2008 (age 18)	14th

== Captaincy history ==
=== Group captaincy ===
Name	Birth date	Current age	Date in office	Age at start date	Length (days)
Yuka Nakanishi	24 January 1989	37	13 April 2013 – 24 February 2014	24	317
Vacant	N/A	N/A	25 February 2014 – 3 March 2016	N/A	737
Makiko Saito	28 June 1994	32	4 March 2016 – 3 July 2024	21	3,043
Vacant	N/A	N/A	4 July 2024 – 4 July 2025	N/A	365
Chikako Matsumoto	19 November 1999	27	5 July 2025 – present	25	502

=== Team captaincy ===
==== Team S ====
Name	Birth date	Current age	Date in office	Age at start date	Length (days)
Rikako Hirata	7 August 1989	37	5 October 2008 – 23 October 2012	19	1,479
Vacant	N/A	N/A	23 October 2012 – 13 April 2013	N/A	172
Yuka Nakanishi	24 January 1989	37	13 April 2013 – 24 February 2014	24	317
Sae Miyazawa	13 August 1990	36	24 February 2014 – 4 March 2016	23	739
Miki Yakata	29 June 1992	34	4 March 2016 – 26 February 2017	23	359
Ryoha Kitagawa	9 October 1998	28	26 February 2017 – 30 September 2019	18	946
Vacant	N/A	N/A	30 September 2019 – 16 February 2020	N/A	139
Chikako Matsumoto	19 November 1999	27	16 February 2020 – 31 March 2025	20	1,870
Honoka Aikawa	22 October 2003	23	1 April 2025 – now	21	597

==== Team KII ====
Name	Birth date	Current age	Date in office	Age at start date	Length (days)
Akane Takayanagi	29 November 1991	34	25 May 2009 – 24 February 2014	17	1,736
Airi Furukawa	13 December 1989	36	24 February 2014 – 30 March 2015	24	399
Mina Oba	3 April 1992	34	30 March 2015 – 21 May 2022	22	2,609
Ayaka Ota	17 August 2000	26	22 May 2022 – 31 March 2025	21	1,044
Miki Ito	11 August 2002	24	1 April 2025 – now	22	597

==== Team E ====
Name	Birth date	Current age	Date in office	Age at start date	Length (days)
Madoka Umemoto	17 July 1992	34	6 December 2010 – 13 April 2013	18	859
Rena Matsui	27 July 1991	35	13 April 2013 – 24 February 2014	21	317
Akari Suda	31 October 1991	35	24 February 2014 – 1 November 2022	22	3,172
Kaho Sato	16 May 1997	29	1 November 2022 – 31 March 2025	25	881
Kimie Akahori	12 January 2002	24	1 April 2025 – now	23	597

== Graduated members ==
Name _{(Birthdate)}	Generation	Team	Election										Notes
Name _{(Birthdate)}	Generation	Team	1	2	3	4	5	6	7	8	9	10	Notes
Kirara Suzuki (鈴木きらら) (July 31, 1993)	1st	S											Graduated on November 24, 2008.
Tsukina Takai (高井つき奈) (July 6, 1995)	1st	S	N/A										Graduated on August 31, 2009.
Yuri Ichihara (市原佑梨) (May 15, 1987)	2nd	KII	N/A										Graduated on November 30, 2009.
Moe Yamashita (山下もえ) (October 27, 1992)	1st	S	N/A										Graduated on December 25, 2009.
Yui Matsushita (松下唯) (July 25, 1988)	1st	S	N/A	N/A	N/A								Graduated on September 30, 2011.
Yūka Nakamura (中村優花) (July 4, 1997)	4th	E			N/A								Graduated on December 31, 2011.
Haruka Ono (小野晴香) (November 24, 1987)	1st	S	N/A	N/A	N/A								Graduated on March 26, 2012.
Haruka Mano (間野春香) (April 27, 1995)	2nd	E	N/A	N/A	N/A								Graduated on March 28, 2012.
Erika Yamada (山田恵里伽) (December 26, 1995)	3rd	E		N/A	N/A								Graduated on March 28, 2012.
Tomoka Wakabayashi (若林倫香) (April 23, 1996)	2nd	KII	N/A	N/A	N/A	N/A							Graduated on July 22, 2012.
Rikako Hirata (平田璃香子) (August 7, 1989)	1st	S	N/A	N/A	N/A	N/A							Graduated on October 23, 2012.
Sawako Hata (秦佐和子) (September 14, 1988)	3rd	KII		N/A	33	25							Graduated on March 29, 2013.
Mitsuki Fujimoto (藤本美月) (September 21, 1995)	5th	KII				N/A							Graduated on April 28, 2013.
Kumi Yagami (矢神久美) (June 13, 1994)	1st	S	N/A	38	N/A	28							Graduated on May 6, 2013.
Mizuki Kuwabara (桑原みずき) (February 2, 1992)	1st	S	N/A	N/A	N/A	N/A							Graduated on May 6, 2013.
Shiori Takada (高田志織) (July 19, 1990)	1st	S	N/A	N/A	N/A	N/A							Graduated on May 6, 2013.
Kanako Hiramatsu (平松可奈子) (November 14, 1991)	1st	S	N/A	N/A	N/A	N/A							Graduated on May 6, 2013.
Ririna Akaeda (赤枝里々奈) (July 3, 1996)	2nd	KII	N/A	N/A	N/A	N/A							Graduated on May 6, 2013.
Shiori Ogiso (小木曽汐莉) (September 15, 1992)	3rd	KII		N/A	N/A	32							Graduated on May 6, 2013.
Kasumi Ueno (上野圭澄) (June 29, 1994)	3rd	E		N/A	N/A	N/A							Graduated on May 6, 2013.
Minami Hara (原望奈美) (December 24, 1995)	4th	E			N/A	N/A							Graduated on May 6, 2013.
Sayaka Niidoi (新土居沙也加) (February 21, 1994)	5th	S				N/A	N/A						Graduated on November 30, 2013.
Rie Kitahara (北原里英) (June 24, 1991)	AKB5th	S	13	16	13	13	21	19	11	12	10		Canceled concurrent position with SKE48 on May 8, 2013.
Nanako Suga (菅なな子) (November 11, 1996)	5th	E				N/A	N/A						Graduated on December 22, 2013.
Seira Satō (佐藤聖羅) (April 30, 1992)	1st	S	N/A	N/A	N/A	N/A							Graduated on February 27, 2014.
Manatsu Mukaida (向田茉夏) (May 10, 1996)	2nd	S	N/A	N/A	N/A	35							Graduated on March 23, 2014.
Aki Deguchi (出口陽) (March 14, 1988)	1st	S	N/A	N/A	N/A	N/A	N/A						Graduated on April 29, 2014.
Rina Matsumoto (松本梨奈) (September 3, 1993)	2nd	KII	N/A	N/A	N/A	N/A	41						Graduated on April 29, 2014.
Momona Kito (鬼頭桃菜) (August 16, 1993)	2nd	E	N/A	N/A	N/A	N/A							Graduated on April 29, 2014.
Shiori Iguchi (井口栞里) (March 29, 1995)	2nd	E	N/A	N/A	N/A	N/A	N/A						Graduated on April 29, 2014.
Shiori Kaneko (金子栞) (June 13, 1995)	4th	E				N/A	63						Graduated on April 29, 2014.
Arisa Ōwaki (大脇有紗) (April 1, 1999)	5th	E				N/A		N/A					Graduated on July 30, 2014.
Tomoko Katō (加藤智子) (April 28, 1987)	2nd	KII	N/A	N/A	N/A	N/A	N/A						Graduated on September 29, 2014.
Yukiko Kinoshita (木下有希子) (December 20, 1993)	3rd	KII		N/A	N/A	N/A	N/A	40					Graduated on November 27, 2014.
Honoka Mizuno (水埜帆乃香) (September 1, 1995)	4th	KII				N/A	N/A						Graduated on December 26, 2014.
Reika Yamada (山田澪花) (July 28, 1995)	2nd	E	N/A	N/A	N/A	N/A	N/A	N/A					Graduated on December 25, 2014.
Mizuho Yamada (山田みずほ) (May 25, 1997)	5th	KII				N/A	N/A	54					Graduated on February 28, 2015.
Tsugumi Iwanaga (岩永亞美) (May 10, 1994)	5th	E				N/A	N/A	46					Graduated on February 27, 2015.
Mieko Satō (佐藤実絵子) (June 24, 1986)	1st	S	N/A	N/A	N/A	N/A	N/A	N/A					Graduated on April 12, 2015.
Yūka Nakanishi (中西優香) (January 24, 1989)	1st (AKB4th)	S	N/A	N/A	N/A	63	64						Graduated on April 12, 2015.
Airi Furukawa (古川愛李) (December 13, 1989)	2nd	KII	N/A	N/A	N/A	30	27	37					Graduated on March 31, 2015.
Ami Kobayashi (小林亜実) (January 12, 1993)	4th	E			N/A	N/A	47	77					Graduated on March 19, 2015.
Nana Yamada (山田菜々) (April 3, 1992)	NMB1st	KII			N/A	46	28	29					Canceled concurrent position with SKE48 on March 26, 2015.
Natsumi Tanaka (田中菜津美) (August 10, 2000)	HKT1st	S				N/A	N/A	N/A	N/A	89	50		Canceled concurrent position with SKE48 on March 26, 2015.
Sae Miyazawa (宮澤佐江) (August 13, 1990)	AKB2nd	S	14	9	11	11	10	12	8				Graduated on April 1, 2016.
Ami Miyamae (宮前杏実) (September 9, 1997)	5th	S				N/A	N/A	N/A	45	65			Graduated on September 28, 2016.
Miki Yakata (矢方美紀) (June 29, 1992)	3rd	S		N/A	N/A	62	N/A	73					Graduated on February 26, 2017.
Yume Noguchi (野口由芽) (April 17, 1998)	6th	S					N/A	N/A	N/A	85			Graduated on February 28, 2017.
Rion Azuma (東李苑) (November 13, 1996)	6th	S					N/A	N/A	61	83			Graduated on March 31, 2017.
Mai Takeuchi (竹内舞) (August 31, 1993)	4th	S			N/A	N/A	N/A	N/A	76	54			Graduated on May 29, 2017.
Haruka Futamura (二村春香) (May 14, 1996)	5th	S				N/A	N/A	34	38	49			Graduated on July 31, 2017.
Masana Ōya (大矢真那) (November 6, 1990)	1st	S	N/A	24	30	27	29	30	20		22		Graduated on November 29, 2017.
Risako Gotō (後藤理沙子) (May 29, 1997)	3rd	S		N/A	N/A	N/A	N/A	N/A	52	100			Graduated on December 18, 2017.
Asana Inuzuka (犬塚あさな) (March 19, 1994)	4th	S			N/A	N/A	N/A	N/A	N/A	N/A	N/A		Graduated on July 11, 2018.
Otoha Machi (町音葉) (November 6, 2001)	7th	S							N/A	N/A	N/A	N/A	Graduated on November 29, 2018.
Rena Isshiki (一色嶺奈) (February 15, 2002)	D2nd	S								N/A	N/A	56	Resigned on December 29, 2018.
Juna Yamada (山田樹奈) (May 25, 1998)	6th	S					N/A	N/A	N/A	N/A	N/A	N/A	Graduated on February 10, 2019.
Miku Okada (岡田美紅) (November 13, 1997)	8th	S									N/A	78	Graduated on May 1, 2019.
Ryōha Kitagawa (北川綾巴) (October 9, 1998)	6th	S					N/A	N/A	66	64	64	27	Graduated on September 30, 2019.
Jurina Matsui (松井珠理奈) (March 8, 1997)	1st	S	19	10	14	9	6	4	5	3	3	1	Graduated on April 30, 2021.
Kano Nojima (野島樺乃) (September 6, 2001)	7th	S							N/A	N/A	N/A	N/A	Graduated on June 30, 2021.
Suzuran Yamauchi (山内鈴蘭) (December 8, 1994)	AKB9th	S		36	N/A	54	61	69	63	71	N/A	N/A	Graduated on November 30, 2021.
Aika Sugiyama (杉山愛佳) (March 5, 2002)	7th	S							N/A	N/A	N/A	110	Graduated on December 31, 2021.
Riho Abiru (阿比留李帆) (July 17, 1993)	2nd	KII	N/A	N/A	N/A	N/A	N/A	74					Graduated on April 30, 2015.
Saki Goudo (神門沙樹) (January 29, 1996)	D1st	KII						N/A	N/A				Graduated on November 19, 2015.
Yukari Yamashita (山下ゆかり) (March 12, 1996)	4th	KII			N/A	N/A	N/A	N/A	N/A				Graduated on March 31, 2016.
Anna Ishida (石田安奈) (May 27, 1996)	2nd	KII	N/A	N/A	N/A	N/A	N/A	N/A	77				Graduated on May 26, 2017.
Natsuki Takatsuka (髙塚夏生) (August 29, 2000)	D1st	KII							N/A	N/A	N/A		Graduated on April 30, 2018.
Yukina Yahagi (矢作有紀奈) (March 13, 1995)	8th	KII									N/A	N/A	Graduated on November 30, 2018.
Yuna Obata (小畑優奈) (December 18, 2001)	7th	KII							N/A	N/A	72	34	Graduated on March 27, 2019.
Kaori Matsumura (松村香織) (March 13, 1995)	3rd	KII		N/A	N/A	34	24	17	13		18	17	Graduated on May 2, 2019.
Yumana Takagi (高木由麻奈) (August 23, 1993)	4th	KII			N/A	N/A	N/A	N/A	N/A		N/A	N/A	Graduated on May 18, 2019.
Mikoto Uchiyama (内山命) (November 14, 1995)	2nd	KII	N/A	N/A	N/A	N/A	N/A	N/A	N/A	N/A	81	42	Graduated on May 30, 2019.
Rinka Ōshiba (大芝りんか) (October 29, 2001)	8th	KII									N/A	N/A	Graduated on November 30, 2020.
Yukino Shirai (白井友紀乃) (September 28, 2000)	9th	KII											Graduated on December 31, 2020.
Narumi Kataoka (片岡成美) (March 13, 2003)	7th	KII							N/A	N/A	N/A	N/A	Graduated on January 20, 2021.
Kotono Shirai (白井琴望) (January 21, 2002)	D2nd	KII								N/A	N/A	N/A	Graduated on January 31, 2021.
Akane Takayanagi (高柳明音) (November 29, 1991)	2nd	KII	N/A	35	23	24	23	31	14	20	15	18	Graduated on April 30, 2021.
Saki Takeuchi (竹内彩姫) (November 24, 1999)	6th	KII					N/A	N/A	N/A	31	56	51	Graduated on May 31, 2021.
Sarina Soda (惣田紗莉渚) (January 18, 1993)	D1st	KII						N/A	55	30	8	11	Graduated on June 30, 2021.
Hayaka Igarashi (五十嵐早香) (September 19, 2001)	10th	KII											Graduated on February 28, 2022.
Mina Oba (大場美奈) (April 3, 1992)	AKB9th	KII		N/A	35	57	48	56	27	22	26	8	Graduated on May 21, 2022.
Nao Furuhata (古畑奈和) (September 15, 1996)	5th	KII				N/A	N/A	55	24	29	14	15	Graduated on September 30, 2022.
Rena Matsui (松井玲奈) (July 27, 1991)	1st	E	29	11	10	10	7	5					Graduated on August 31, 2015.
Kyōka Isohara (磯原杏華) (August 8, 1996)	2nd	E	N/A	N/A	N/A	N/A	58	44	53				Graduated on January 25, 2016.
Kumiko Koishi (小石公美子) (August 4, 1995)	D1st	E						N/A	N/A				Graduated on February 23, 2016.
Madoka Umemoto (梅本まどか) (July 17, 1992)	4th	E			N/A	N/A	39	68	68				Graduated on February 24, 2016.
Rumi Katō (加藤るみ) (March 9, 1995)	2nd	E	N/A	N/A	N/A	N/A	N/A		62				Graduated on May 29, 2016.
Aya Shibata (柴田阿弥) (April 1, 1993)	4th	E			N/A	N/A	17	15	15				Graduated on August 31, 2016.
Mei Sakai (酒井萌衣) (December 13, 1997)	4th	E			N/A	N/A	N/A	N/A	N/A	63			Graduated on March 25, 2017.
Kanon Kimoto (木本花音) (August 11, 1997)	4th	E			N/A	56	31	50	48	68	88		Graduated on December 1, 2017.
Sumire Satō (佐藤すみれ) (November 20, 1993)	AKB7th	E	N/A	31	34	61	52	N/A	49	75	68		Graduated on January 7, 2018.
Sana Takatera (高寺沙菜) (November 15, 1999)	D1st	E						N/A	N/A	N/A	N/A		Graduated on January 29, 2018.
Narumi Ichino (市野成美) (April 14, 1999)	5th	E				N/A	N/A	N/A	N/A	N/A	99		Graduated on March 27, 2018.
Kohaku Shirayuki (白雪希明) (August 30, 1998)	8th	E									N/A	N/A	Graduated on May 1, 2019.
Rara Gotō (後藤楽々) (July 23, 2000)	7th	E							N/A	N/A	46		Graduated on September 30, 2019.
Miki Nonogaki (野々垣美希) (October 7, 1999)	8th	E									N/A	N/A	Graduated on December 8, 2019.
Marina Nishi (西満里奈) (January 16, 2000)	D3rd	E										N/A	Graduated on March 31, 2021.
Shiina Hirata (平田詩奈) (August 22, 1999)	D3rd	E										N/A	Graduated on March 31, 2021.
Kanon Ishikawa (石川花音) (December 19, 1997)	9th	E											Graduated on May 31, 2021.
Negai Fukai (深井ねがい) (January 16, 2003)	8th	E									N/A	N/A	Graduated on January 31, 2022.
Akari Suda (須田亜香里) (October 31, 1991)	3rd	E		N/A	36	29	16	10	18	7	6	2	Graduated on December 1, 2022.

== Discography ==
=== Studio albums ===
List of studio albums, with selected chart positions, sales and certifications
Title	Details	Peak chart positions	Sales			Certifications
Title	Details	JPN	Oricon		Billboard Japan	Certifications
Title	Details	JPN	First week	Total	Billboard Japan	Certifications
Kono Hi no Chime o Wasurenai (この日のチャイムを忘れない)	Released: September 19, 2012; Label: Avex Trax; Formats: CD, CD+DVD, digital download	2	110,613	150,835	—N/a	RIAJ: Gold
Kakumei no Oka (革命の丘)	Released: February 22, 2017; Label: Avex Trax; Formats: CD, CD+DVD, digital download	2	99,646	126,720	136,479	RIAJ: Gold

=== Stage albums ===
List of stage albums, with selected chart positions
Title	Details	Peak chart positions
Title	Details	JPN
Te o Tsunaginagara (手をつなぎながら)	Released: February 10, 2010 (Team S); Label: Crown Gold; Formats: CD, digital download	21
Te o Tsunaginagara (手をつなぎながら)	Released: March 3, 2010 (Team KII); Label: Crown Gold; Formats: CD, digital download	59
Seifuku no Me (制服の芽)	Released: April 28, 2010 (Team S); Label: Crown Gold; Formats: CD, digital download	22
Ramune no Nomikata (ラムネの飲み方)	Released: March 14, 2012 (Team KII); Label: Avex Trax; Formats: CD, digital download	6
SKE Festival (SKEフェスティバル)	Released: September 27, 2017 (Team E); Label: Avex Trax; Formats: CD, digital download	10
Ai o Kimi ni, Ai o Boku ni (愛を君に、愛を僕に)	Released: June 8, 2022 (Team S); Label: Zest Records; Formats: CD, digital download	3
Jikan ga Nai (時間がない)	Released: December 21, 2022 (Team KII); Label: Zest Records; Formats: CD, digital download	12
Koe Dashite Ikōze!!! (声出していこーぜ！！！)	Released: August 2, 2023 (Team E); Label: Zest Records; Formats: CD, digital download	11

=== Singles ===
List of singles, with selected chart positions, showing year released, sales, certifications and album name
No.	Title	Year	Peak chart positions		Sales			Certifications	Albums
No.	Title	Year	JPN	JPN Hot	Oricon		Billboard Japan	Certifications	Albums
No.	Title	Year	JPN	JPN Hot	First week	Total	Billboard Japan	Certifications	Albums
1	"Tsuyoki Mono yo" (強き者よ)	2009	5	91	22,624	27,259	—N/a	—N/a	Kono Hi no Chime o Wasurenai
2	"Aozora Kataomoi" (青空片想い)	2010	3	47	34,747	51,180	—N/a	—N/a	Kono Hi no Chime o Wasurenai
3	"Gomen ne, Summer" (ごめんね、SUMMER)	2010	3	6	62,078	96,049	—N/a	RIAJ: Gold (phy.)	Kono Hi no Chime o Wasurenai
4	"1! 2! 3! 4! Yoroshiku!" (1!2!3!4! ヨロシク!)	2010	2	6	119,913	175,027	—N/a	RIAJ: Gold (phy.)	Kono Hi no Chime o Wasurenai
5	"Banzai Venus" (バンザイVenus)	2011	1	2	206,608	275,189	—N/a	RIAJ: Platinum (phy.)	Kono Hi no Chime o Wasurenai
6	"Pareo wa Emerald" (パレオはエメラルド)	2011	1	1	378,747	480,916	—N/a	RIAJ: 2× Platinum (phy.); RIAJ: Gold (dig.)	Kono Hi no Chime o Wasurenai
7	"Okey Dokey" (オキドキ)	2011	1	1	382,802	474,970	—N/a	RIAJ: 2× Platinum (phy.); RIAJ: Gold (dig.)	Kono Hi no Chime o Wasurenai
8	"Kataomoi Finally" (片想いFinally)	2012	1	1	495,809	592,947	—N/a	RIAJ: 2× Platinum (phy.); RIAJ: Gold (dig.)	Kono Hi no Chime o Wasurenai
9	"Aishite-love-ru!" (アイシテラブル!)	2012	1	1	472,327	581,874	—N/a	RIAJ: 2× Platinum (phy.); RIAJ: Gold (dig.)	Kakumei no Oka
10	"Kiss Datte Hidarikiki" (キスだって左利き)	2012	1	1	511,472	598,011	—N/a	RIAJ: 2× Platinum (phy.)	Kakumei no Oka
11	"Choco no Dorei" (チョコの奴隷)	2013	1	1	538,914	671,623	—N/a	RIAJ: 2× Platinum (phy.)	Kakumei no Oka
12	"Utsukushii Inazuma" (美しい稲妻)	2013	1	1	510,673	661,557	—N/a	RIAJ: 2× Platinum (phy.)	Kakumei no Oka
13	"Sansei Kawaii!" (賛成カワイイ!)	2013	1	1	449,003	569,566	—N/a	RIAJ: 2× Platinum (phy.)	Kakumei no Oka
14	"Mirai to wa?" (未来とは?)	2014	1	1	397,874	504,576	—N/a	RIAJ: 2× Platinum (phy.)	Kakumei no Oka
15	"Bukiyō Taiyō" (不器用太陽)	2014	1	1	324,076	464,116	—N/a	RIAJ: 2× Platinum (phy.)	Kakumei no Oka
16	"12gatsu no Kangaroo" (12月のカンガルー)	2014	1	2	386,495	452,543	—N/a	RIAJ: 2× Platinum (phy.)	Kakumei no Oka
17	"Coquettish Jūtai Chū" (コケティッシュ渋滞中)	2015	1	2	573,074	702,299	—N/a	RIAJ: Platinum (phy.)	Kakumei no Oka
18	"Maenomeri" (前のめり)	2015	1	1	370,135	461,604	—N/a	RIAJ: 2× Platinum (phy.)	Kakumei no Oka
19	"Chicken Line" (チキンLINE)	2016	1	1	257,095	365,328	464,298	RIAJ: Platinum (phy.)	Kakumei no Oka
20	"Kin no Ai, Gin no Ai" (金の愛、銀の愛)	2016	1	1	251,639	327,598	436,451	RIAJ: Platinum (phy.)	Kakumei no Oka
21	"Igai ni Mango" (意外にマンゴー)	2017	1	1	272,872	341,514	484,188	RIAJ: Platinum (phy.)	Non-album singles
22	"Muishiki no Iro" (無意識の色)	2018	1	1	278,892	386,683	453,363	RIAJ: Platinum (phy.)	Non-album singles
23	"Ikinari Punch Line" (いきなりパンチライン)	2018	1	1	240,126	390,770	491,438	RIAJ: Platinum (phy.)	Non-album singles
24	"Stand by You"	2018	1	1	234,008	419,763	533,418	RIAJ: Platinum (phy.)	Non-album singles
25	"Frustration"	2019	1	1	320,614	450,035	577,840	RIAJ: Platinum (phy.)	Non-album singles
26	"Sōyūtoko Aru yo ne?" (ソーユートコあるよね?)	2020	1	1	289,471	325,609	403,847	RIAJ: Platinum (phy.)	Non-album singles
27	"Koiochi Flag" (恋落ちフラグ)	2021	1	1	190,570	267,089	318,835	RIAJ: Platinum (phy.)	Non-album singles
28	"Ano Koro no Kimi o Mitsuketa" (あの頃の君を見つけた)	2021	1	1			351,318	RIAJ: Platinum (phy.)	Non-album singles
29	"Kokoro ni Flower" (心にFlower)	2022	1	3	213,371		341,174	RIAJ: Platinum (phy.)	Non-album singles
30	"Zettai Inspiration" (絶対インスピレーション)	2022	1	1	225,424		404,872	RIAJ: Platinum (phy.)	Non-album singles
31	"Suki ni Nacchatta" (好きになっちゃった)	2023	1	3	313,448		580,242	RIAJ: Platinum (phy.)	Non-album singles
32	"Ai no Hologram" (愛のホログラム)	2024	1	2	271,122		691,192	RIAJ: Platinum (phy.)	Non-album singles
33	"Kokuhaku Shinpakusu" (告白心拍数)	2024	1	2	209,878		519,739	RIAJ: Platinum (phy.)	Non-album singles
34	"Tick Tack Zack"	2025	2	3	191,297		421,479	RIAJ: Platinum (phy.)	Non-album singles
35	"Karma"	2025	3	4	231,594			RIAJ: Platinum (phy.)	Non-album singles
36	"Sandal Daze" (サンダルだぜ)	2026	2	3	188,214			RIAJ: Platinum (phy.)	Non-album singles
37	"Tameiki Mirai" (ため息未来)	2026	2	4	234,278			RIAJ: Platinum (phy.)	Non-album singles

== See also ==
- AKB48
- NMB48
- HKT48
- JKT48
- NGT48
- STU48
- BNK48
- MNL48
- TPE48
- TSH48
- SGO48
- CGM48
- DEL48
