= Love Trip / Shiawase o Wakenasai =

"Love Trip / Shiawase wo Wakenasai"

Single by AKB48

from the album Thumbnail
- A-side: Love Trip; Shiawase wo Wakenasai
- B-side: Hikari to Kage no Hibi; Densetsu no Sakana (Type A); Shinka Shite Nējan (Type B); Kishi ga Mieru Umi Kara (Type C); 2016 Nen no Invitation (Type D); Hikari no Naka e (Type E); Black Flower (Theater Edition)
- Released: August 31, 2016
- Genre: J-pop
- Length: #1 5:50 #2 4:54
- Label: You, Be Cool! / King; Genie Music; Stone Music Entertainment
- Songwriter(s): Yasushi Akimoto (lyrics)
- Producer(s): Yasushi Akimoto

AKB48 singles chronology
"Tsubasa wa Iranai" (2016)	"Love Trip / Shiawase wo Wakenasai" (2016)	"High Tension" (2016)

Music video
- LOVE TRIP on YouTube

"Love Trip / Shiawase wo Wakenasai" (LOVE TRIP/しあわせを分けなさい) is the 45th single by the Japanese idol girl group AKB48. It was released in Japan on August 31, 2016. It was number-one on the Oricon Weekly Singles Chart with 1,177,769 copies sold. The song also reached number-one on the Billboard Japan Hot 100.

== Background ==
The member lineup for the title track and several supporting B-sides was determined by the results from the annual election held by AKB48 and its several sister groups. Rino Sashihara, having won the election for the third time, serves as the center (choreography center) in the title song.

== Track listing ==
=== Type-A ===
CD
No.	Title	Length
1.	"LOVE TRIP"	5:50
2.	"Shiawase wo Wakenasai (しあわせを分けなさい)"	4:54
3.	"Hikari to Kage no Hibi (光と影の日々)"	4:27
4.	"Densetsu no Sakana (伝説の魚) (Under Girls)"	4:19
5.	"LOVE TRIP (off vocal ver.)"	5:50
6.	"Shiawase wo Wakenasai (off vocal ver.)"	4:54
7.	"Hikari to Kage no Hibi (off vocal ver.)"	4:27
8.	"Densetsu no Sakana (off vocal ver.)"	4:17

DVD
No.	Title	Length
1.	"LOVE TRIP"
2.	"Shiawase wo Wakenasai (しあわせを分けなさい)"
3.	"Hikari to Kage no Hibi (光と影の日々)"
4.	"Densetsu no Sakana (伝説の魚)"

=== Type-B ===
CD
No.	Title	Length
1.	"LOVE TRIP"	5:50
2.	"Shiawase wo Wakenasai (しあわせを分けなさい)"	4:54
3.	"Hikari to Kage no Hibi (光と影の日々)"	4:27
4.	"Shinka Shite Nējan (進化してねえじゃん) (Next Girls)"	3:45
5.	"LOVE TRIP (off vocal ver.)"	5:50
6.	"Shiawase wo Wakenasai (off vocal ver.)"	4:54
7.	"Hikari to Kage no Hibi (off vocal ver.)"	4:27
8.	"Shinka Shite Nējan (off vocal ver.)"	3:45

DVD
No.	Title	Length
1.	"LOVE TRIP"
2.	"Shiawase wo Wakenasai (しあわせを分けなさい)"
3.	"Hikari to Kage no Hibi (光と影の日々)"
4.	"Shinka Shite Nējan (進化してねえじゃん)"

=== Type-C ===
CD
No.	Title	Length
1.	"LOVE TRIP"	5:50
2.	"Shiawase wo Wakenasai (しあわせを分けなさい)"	4:54
3.	"Hikari to Kage no Hibi (光と影の日々)"	4:27
4.	"Kishi ga Mieru Umi Kara (岸が見える海から) (Future Girls)"	5:13
5.	"LOVE TRIP (off vocal ver.)"	5:50
6.	"Shiawase wo Wakenasai (off vocal ver.)"	4:54
7.	"Hikari to Kage no Hibi (off vocal ver.)"	4:27
8.	"Kishi ga Mieru Umi Kara (off vocal ver.)"	5:12

DVD
No.	Title	Length
1.	"LOVE TRIP"
2.	"Shiawase wo Wakenasai (しあわせを分けなさい)"
3.	"Hikari to Kage no Hibi (光と影の日々)"
4.	"Kishi ga Mieru Umi Kara (岸が見える海から)"

=== Type-D ===
CD
No.	Title	Length
1.	"LOVE TRIP"	5:50
2.	"Shiawase wo Wakenasai (しあわせを分けなさい)"	4:54
3.	"Hikari to Kage no Hibi (光と影の日々)"	4:27
4.	"2016 Nen no Invitation (2016年のInvitation) (Upcoming Girls)"	4:19
5.	"LOVE TRIP (off vocal ver.)"	5:50
6.	"Shiawase wo Wakenasai (off vocal ver.)"	4:54
7.	"Hikari to Kage no Hibi (off vocal ver.)"	4:27
8.	"2016 Nen no Invitation (off vocal ver.)"	4:18

DVD
No.	Title	Length
1.	"LOVE TRIP"
2.	"Shiawase wo Wakenasai (しあわせを分けなさい)"
3.	"Hikari to Kage no Hibi (光と影の日々)"
4.	"2016 Nen no Invitation (2016年のInvitation)"

=== Type-E ===
CD
No.	Title	Length
1.	"LOVE TRIP"	5:50
2.	"Shiawase wo Wakenasai (しあわせを分けなさい)"	4:54
3.	"Hikari to Kage no Hibi (光と影の日々)"	4:27
4.	"Hikari no Naka e (光の中へ) (Baito AKB Paruru Senbatsu)"	4:50
5.	"LOVE TRIP (off vocal ver.)"	5:50
6.	"Shiawase wo Wakenasai (off vocal ver.)"	4:54
7.	"Hikari to Kage no Hibi (off vocal ver.)"	4:27
8.	"Hikari no Naka e (off vocal ver.)"	4:49

DVD
No.	Title	Length
1.	"LOVE TRIP"
2.	"Shiawase wo Wakenasai (しあわせを分けなさい)"
3.	"Hikari to Kage no Hibi (光と影の日々)"
4.	"Hikari no Naka e (光の中へ)"
5.	"Shiawase wo Wakenasai (しあわせを分けなさい) (Long ver.)"

=== Theater Edition ===
CD
No.	Title	Length
1.	"LOVE TRIP"	5:50
2.	"Shiawase wo Wakenasai (しあわせを分けなさい)"	4:54
3.	"Hikari to Kage no Hibi (光と影の日々)"	4:27
4.	"BLACK FLOWER"	3:20
5.	"LOVE TRIP (off vocal ver.)"	5:50
6.	"Shiawase wo Wakenasai (off vocal ver.)"	4:54
7.	"Hikari to Kage no Hibi (off vocal ver.)"	4:27
8.	"BLACK FLOWER (off vocal ver.)"	3:09

== Personnel ==
=== Love Trip and Shiawase wo Wakenasai ===
16 members, ranked 1st to 16th of the 45th single general election, were selected for the song. The choreography center is Rino Sashihara.

- AKB48 Team A: Haruka Shimazaki, Yui Yokoyama, Haruna Kojima
- AKB48 Team A/HKT48 Team KIV: Sakura Miyawaki
- AKB48 Team K: Tomu Muto, Mion Mukaichi
- AKB48 Team K/HKT48 Team H: Haruka Kodama
- AKB48 Team B/NGT48 Team NIII: Yuki Kashiwagi
- AKB48 Team B: Mayu Watanabe
- AKB48 Team 4: Nana Okada, Juri Takahashi
- SKE48 Team S: Jurina Matsui
- SKE48 Team E: Akari Suda
- NMB48 Team N: Sayaka Yamamoto
- HKT48 Team H: Rino Sashihara
- NGT48 Team NIII: Rie Kitahara

=== Hikari to Kage no Hibi ===
- AKB48 Team A: Anna Iriyama, Yui Yokoyama
- AKB48 Team A/HKT48 Team KIV: Sakura Miyawaki
- AKB48 Team A/NMB48 Team M: Miru Shiroma
- AKB48 Team K/HKT48 Team H: Haruka Kodama
- AKB48 Team B: Mayu Watanabe
- AKB48 Team B/NGT48 Team NIII: Yuki Kashiwagi
- AKB48 Team 4/SKE48 Team S: Ryoha Kitagawa
- SKE48 Team S: Jurina Matsui
- SKE48 Team KII: Akane Takayanagi
- NMB48 Team N: Sayaka Yamamoto
- NMB48 Team M: Fuuko Yagura
- HKT48 Team H: Rino Sashihara
- NGT48 Team NIII: Rie Kitahara, Minami Kato, Moeka Takakura

=== Densetsu no Sakana ===
16 members, ranked 17th to 32nd of the 45th single general election, are called Under Girls and sing this song.

- AKB48 Team A: Anna Iriyama
- AKB48 Team A/NMB48 Team M: Miru Shiroma
- AKB48 Team K: Minami Minegishi
- AKB48 Team B: Rena Katō, Ryōka Ōshima
- AKB48 Team B/HKT48 Team H: Nako Yabuki
- AKB48 Team 4: Mako Kojima, Haruka Komiyama, Saya Kawamoto
- AKB48 Team 4/HKT48 KIV: Mio Tomonaga
- SKE48 Team KII: Akane Takayanagi, Mina Ōba, Nao Furuhata, Sarina Sōda, Saki Takeuchi
- NMB48 Team M: Ayaka Okita

=== Shinka Shite Nējan ===
16 members, ranked 33rd to 48th of the 45th single general election, are called Next Girls and sing this song.

- AKB48 Team A: Yukari Sasaki
- AKB48 Team K: Shinobu Mogi
- AKB48 Team B: Yuria Kizaki
- AKB48 Team 8: Narumi Kuranoo
- SKE48 Team KII: Yuna Ego
- NMB48 Team N: Ririka Sutō
- NMB48 Team M: Fūko Yagura, Reina Fujie
- NMB48 Team BII: Shu Yabushita
- HKT48 Team H: Meru Tashima, Miku Tanaka, Natsumi Matsuoka, Yuriya Inoue
- HKT48 Team KIV: Aoi Motomura, Mai Fuchigami, Asuka Tomiyoshi

=== Kishi ga Mieru Umi Kara ===
16 members, ranked 49th to 64th of the 45th single general election, are called Future Girls and sing this song.

- AKB48 Team A: Nana Owada
- AKB48 Team 4: Saho Iwatate, Ayaka Okada, Miki Nishino
- AKB48 Team 4/SKE48 Team S: Ryoha Kitagawa
- AKB48 Team 4/NMB48 Team BII: Nagisa Shibuya
- SKE48 Team S: Haruka Futamura, Mai Takeuchi
- SKE48 Team E: Marika Tani, Mei Sakai
- NMB48 Team N: Yūri Ōta
- HKT48 Team H: Yui Kōjina, Riko Sakaguchi, Hiroka Komada
- HKT48 Team KIV: Madoka Moriyasu, Nao Ueki

=== 2016 Nen no Invitation ===
16 members, ranked 65th to 80th of the 45th single general election, are called Upcoming Girls and sing this song.

- AKB48 Team A: Megu Taniguchi, Miho Miyazaki
- AKB48 TeamB/Team 8: Nagisa Sakaguchi
- AKB48 Team 4: Miyū Ōmori
- SKE48 Team S: Ami Miyamae, Suzuran Yamauchi
- SKE48 Team KII: Yuzuki Hidaka
- SKE48 Team E: Haruka Kumazaki, Kanon Kimoto, Natsuki Kamata, Sumire Satō
- NMB48 Team N: Rika Kishino, Akari Yoshida
- HKT48 Team H: Yuka Akiyoshi
- HKT48 Team KIV: Anna Murashige
- NGT48 Team NIII: Minami Katō

=== Hikari no Naka e ===
Baito AKB Paruru Senbatsu members.

- AKB48 Team A: Haruka Shimazaki
- Fuyuka Shigefuji
- Yūka Hinode

=== Black Flower ===
This song is used as the featured song for Crow's Blood. The word in parentheses is the role name.

- AKB48 Team A: Anna Iriyama (Aoi Nojiri), Yui Yokoyama (Chisa Furugōri)
- AKB48 Team A/HKT48 Team KIV: Sakura Miyawaki (Maki Togawa)
- AKB48 Team K: Mion Mukaichi (Nami Katayama)
- AKB48 Team B: Mayu Watanabe (Kaoru Isozaki), Yuria Kizaki (Hikari Yanaka), Rena Katō (Keiko Yodogawa)
- AKB48 Team B/NGT48 Team NIII: Yuki Kashiwagi (Mai Utsui)
- SKE48 Team S: Jurina Matsui (Shinobu Matsumura)

== Release history ==
Region	Date	Format	Label
Japan	August 31, 2016	CD; digital download; streaming	King Records (YOU BE COOL division)
Hong Kong, Taiwan	August 31, 2016	CD; digital download; streaming	King Records
South Korea	September 21, 2018	digital download; streaming	Stone Music Entertainment; Genie Music; King

== Charts ==
Chart (2016)	Peak position
Japan (Oricon Weekly Singles Chart)	1
Japan (Billboard Japan Hot 100)	1

== Works cited ==
- AKB48 (31 August 2016a). Love Trip / Shiawase wo Wakenasai (Type-A ed.). You, Be Cool! / King. ASIN B01H6JHMR6. KIZM-90441/2.
- AKB48 (31 August 2016b). Love Trip / Shiawase wo Wakenasai (Type-B ed.). You, Be Cool! / King. ASIN B01H6JHPIW. KIZM-90443/4.
- AKB48 (31 August 2016c). Love Trip / Shiawase wo Wakenasai (Type-C ed.). You, Be Cool! / King. ASIN B01H6JHS2U. KIZM-90445/6.
- AKB48 (31 August 2016d). Love Trip / Shiawase wo Wakenasai (Type-D ed.). You, Be Cool! / King. ASIN B01H6JHMPI. KIZM-90447/8.
- AKB48 (31 August 2016e). Love Trip / Shiawase wo Wakenasai (Type-E ed.). You, Be Cool! / King. ASIN B01H6JHS98. KIZM-90449/50.
- AKB48 (31 August 2016t). Love Trip / Shiawase wo Wakenasai (Theater ed.). You, Be Cool! / King. ASIN B01L8772FE. NMAX-1243.
