= Negaigoto no Mochigusare =

Single by AKB48

from the album Bokutachi wa, Ano Hi no Yoake wo Shitteiru
- A-side: "Negaigoto no Mochigusare"
- Released: May 31, 2017
- Genre: J-pop; Folk
- Length: 3:05
- Label: You, Be Cool! / King; Genie Music; Stone Music Entertainment
- Songwriter(s): Yasushi Akimoto (lyrics); Shiori Uchiyama (music); Junko Yokoyama (arrangement)
- Producer(s): Yasushi Akimoto

AKB48 singles chronology
"Shoot Sign" (2017)	"Negaigoto no Mochigusare" (2017)	"#sukinanda" (2017)

Music video
- "Negaigoto no Mochigusare" on YouTube

Negaigoto no Mochigusare (願いごとの持ち腐れ; "Useless Wish") is the 48th single by AKB48, released on May 31, 2017. The title song was first performed live on NCON, a traditional school choir contest promoted by NHK, and later on other shows Minna no Uta and AKB48 Show where this song made their its TV appearances.

The single was number-one on the Oricon weekly Singles Chart, with 1,305,747 copies sold, and was also number-one the Billboard Japan Hot 100.

== Abstract ==
The song is reminiscent of Russian folk songs, and moves at an almost waltzing tempo.

An original song performed by STU48, "Setouchi no Koe", was included as coupling song, however, as the Theater Edition does not come with bonus DVD included, the full MV was released on the official STU48 channel and later included in the bonus disc from debut single "Kurayami".

== Release and promotion ==
This single will be released in seven versions: three limited editions (Types A, B and C), three regular editions (Types A, B and C) and Theater edition. All types will include the voting tickets for the AKB48 49th Single Senbatsu Sousenkyo to be held in Okinawa on June 17, 2017.

For this single, Jurina Matsui & Sakura Miyawaki will serve as double center.

Two versions of music video (Short and Full) were released on AKB48 official channel on May 2, 2017. The Full MV lasts 11 minutes and 6 seconds, marking the third longest AKB48 A-Side music video released on YouTube ("Bokutachi wa Tatakawanai" music video has 11'54", and "Kuchibiru ni Be My Baby" has 13'05"). Due to the length, PlayTV only aired the short version (instead of full version) on Interferência Ichiban on May 8, 2017. This is the first single to release after Kojima Haruna graduated from the group.

== Track listing ==
=== Type A ===
No.	Title	Length
1.	"Negaigoto no Mochigusare (願いごとの持ち腐れ) (performed by Senbatsu)"	2:59
2.	"Ima Para (イマパラ)"	3:19
3.	"Maebure (前触れ)"
4.	"Negaigoto no Mochigusare (off-vocal)"	2:59
5.	"Ima Para (off-vocal)"	3:19
6.	"Maebure (off-vocal)"

DVD
No.	Title	Length
1.	"Negaigoto no Mochigusare Music Video"	11:06
2.	"Ima Para Music Video"
3.	"Maebure Music Video"

=== Type B ===
No.	Title	Length
1.	"Negaigoto no Mochigusare (願いごとの持ち腐れ) (performed by Senbatsu)"	2:59
2.	"Ima Para (イマパラ)"	3:19
3.	"Tenmetsu Pheromone (点滅フェロモン)"
4.	"Negaigoto no Mochigusare (off-vocal)"	2:59
5.	"Ima Para (off-vocal)"	3:19
6.	"Tenmetsu Pheromone (off-vocal)"

DVD
No.	Title	Length
1.	"Negaigoto no Mochigusare Music Video"
2.	"Ima Para Music Video"
3.	"Tenmetsu Pheromone Music Video"

=== Type C ===
No.	Title	Length
1.	"Negaigoto no Mochigusare (願いごとの持ち腐れ) (performed by Senbatsu)"	2:59
2.	"Ima Para (イマパラ)"	3:19
3.	"Anokoro no Gohyaku Yen Dama (あの頃の五百円玉)"	5:02
4.	"Negaigoto no Mochigusare (off-vocal)"	2:59
5.	"Ima Para (off-vocal)"	3:19
6.	"Anokoro no Gohyaku Yen Dama"	5:02

DVD
No.	Title	Length
1.	"Negaigoto no Mochigusare Music Video"
2.	"Ima Para Music Video"
3.	"Anogoro no Gohyaku Yen Dama Music Video"

=== Theater Edition ===
CD Only (Theater edition doesn't include a Bonus DVD)
No.	Title	Length
1.	"Negaigoto no Mochigusare (願いごとの持ち腐れ) (performed by Senbatsu)"	2:59
2.	"Ima Para (イマパラ)"	3:19
3.	"Setouchi no Koe (瀬戸内の声) (performed by STU48)"	5:28
4.	"Negaigoto no Mochigusare (off-vocal)"	2:59
5.	"Ima Para (off-vocal)"	3:19
6.	"Setouchi no Koe (off-vocal)"	5:28

== Release history ==
Region	Date	Format	Label
Japan	March 31, 2017	CD; digital download; streaming	King Records (YOU BE COOL division)
Hong Kong, Taiwan	March 31, 2017	CD; digital download; streaming	King Records
South Korea	August 31, 2018	digital download; streaming	Stone Music Entertainment; Genie Music; King

== Personnel ==
（35 Members） The performers for the main single "Negaigoto no Mochigusare" are:

- AKB48 Team A: Anna Iriyama, Shizuka Oya, Yui Yokoyama
- AKB48 Team K: Minami Minegishi, Mion Mukaichi, Tomu Muto
- AKB48 Team B: Yuki Kashiwagi, Rena Kato, Yuria Kizaki, Mayu Watanabe
- AKB48 Team 4: Nana Okada, Saya Kawamoto, Mako Kojima, Haruka Komiyama, Juri Takahashi
- AKB48 Team 8: Yui Oguri, Erina Oda
- AKB48 Kenkyuusei: Satone Kubo
- SKE48 Team S: Jurina Matsui
- SKE48 Team KII: Akane Takayanagi, Nao Furuhata
- NMB48 Team N: Miori Ichikawa, Ayaka Yamamoto, Sayaka Yamamoto
- NMB48 Team M: Miru Shiroma, Akari Yoshida
- HKT48 Team H: Haruka Kodama, Rino Sashihara
- HKT48 Team KIV: Mio Tomonaga, Sakura Miyawaki
- HKT48 Team TII: Hana Matsuoka
- NGT48 Team NIII: Rie Kitahara, Rika Nakai

=== "Ima Para" ===
(25 Members) Rino Sashihara Center

- Team A: Miyazaki Miho
- Team 4: Nana Okada
- Team 8: Onishi Momoka, Sato Nanami
- AKB48 Kenkyuusei: Asai Nanami
- Team KII: Mina Oba, Soda Sarina, Hidaka Yuzuki
- Team E: Kimoto Kanon, Kumazaki Haruka, Goto Rara, Sato Sumire, Akari Suda, Marika Tani
- Team N: Ririka Suto
- Team BII: Yuuri Ota
- Team H: Sashihara Rino, Nako Yabuki
- Team KIV: Ueki Nao, Tomiyoshi Asuka, Murashige Anna, Motomura Aoi
- Team NIII: Yuka Ogino, Kitahara Rie, Rika Nakai

=== "Maebure" ===
(22 Members) (Mayu Watanabe Center)

- Team A: Hiwatashi Yui
- Team B: Fukuoka Seina, Ma Chia-ling, Watanabe Mayu
- Team 4: Saya Kawamoto, Mako Kojima, Haruka Komiyama
- Team 8: Yui Oguri, Nagisa Sakaguchi
- AKB48 Kenkyuusei: Kubo Satone, Manaka Taguchi, Erī Chiba
- Team S: Ryoha Kitagawa
- Team KII: Ego Yuna, Obata Yuna, Takeuchi Saki
- Team H: Tashima Meru, Miku Tanaka
- Team KIV: Mio Tomonaga, Miyawaki Sakura
- Team TII: Hana Matsuoka
- Team NIII: Moeka Takakura

=== "Tenmetsu Pheromone" ===
(21 Members) (Jurina Matsui Center)

- Team A: Megu Taniguchi
- Team K: Yuka Tano, Mion Mukaichi, Tomu Muto, Mogi Shinobu
- Team B: Kizaki Yuria, Moe Goto
- Team 4: Juri Takahashi
- Team 8: Okabe Rin, Kuranoo Narumi, Yamada Nanami
- AKB48 Kenkyuusei: Yamauchi Mizuki
- Team S: Jurina Matsui, Suzuran Yamauchi
- Team N: Yamamoto Ayaka
- Team M: Miru Shiroma
- Team BII: Okita Ayaka
- Team H: Yuka Akiyoshi, Inoue Yuriya, Matsuoka Natsumi
- Team NIII: Minami Kato

=== "Ano Koro no Gohyaku Yen Dama" ===
(21 Members) (Yamamoto Sayaka Center)

- Team A: Anna Iriyama, Yukari Sasaki, Yokoyama Yui
- Team K: Minegishi Minami
- Team B: Yuki Kashiwagi, Kato Rena
- Team 4: Saho Iwatate, Omori Miyuu
- Team S: Futamura Haruka
- Team KII: Akane Takayanagi, Nao Furuhata
- Team E: Kamata Natsuki
- Team N: Yamamoto Sayaka
- Team M: Nagisa Shibuya, Akari Yoshida
- Team BII: Fuuko Yagura
- Team H: Yui Kojina, Komada Hiroka, Sakaguchi Riko
- Team KIV: Fuchigami Mai, Moriyasu Madoka

=== "Setouchi no Koe" ===
STU48 Senbatsu (16 Members)Yumiko Takino Center

STU48 1st Generation: Isogai Kanon, Ichioka Ayumi, Iwata Hina, Okada Nana, Ozaki Mami, Kadota Momona, Sashihara Rino, Takino Yumiko, Taniguchi Mahina, Cho Orie, Torobu Yuri, Fukuda Akari, Fujiwara Azusa, Mishima Haruka, Mori Kaho, Yabushita Fu
