= Nao Furuhata =

Japanese singer (born 1996)

Nao Furuhata 古畑 奈和
- Also known as: Nao
- Born: 15 September 1996 (age 29)
- Origin: Aichi Prefecture, Japan
- Genres: J-pop
- Occupations: Idol; singer
- Instruments: Vocals; Saxophone
- Years active: 2011 – present
- Label: AKS

Nao Furuhata (古畑 奈和, Furuhata Nao; born 15 September 1996) is a former member of the Japanese idol girl group SKE48. She is a former member of SKE48's Team KII, and a former member of AKB48.

== Career ==
Furuhata was born in Aichi Prefecture, and passed SKE48's 5th generation auditions in October 2011. Her audition song was SKE48's Aozora Kataomoi. Her debut was on November 26, 2011. On August 29, 2012, she was promoted to Team E. She held a concurrent position in AKB48's Team K from April 2013 to February 2014.

Her first SKE48 Senbatsu was for the single Utsukushii Inazuma.

In February 2014, during the AKB48 Group Shuffle, it was announced she would be transferred to Team KII and her concurrent position would be shifted to Team A. In the 2014 general elections, she ranked for the first time, placing 55th with 14,634 votes.

On 26 March 2015, it was announced that she would be relieved of her concurrent position in AKB48.

Furuhata released three music videos in collaboration with the metal band Bridear on April 4, 2020, where they covered songs from SKE48 and her 2018 solo EP. The two acts were originally scheduled to perform together in Tokyo and Osaka, but the concerts were cancelled due to the COVID-19 pandemic in Japan.

== Appearances ==
=== TV dramas ===
- Yamegoku: Yakuza Yamete Itadakimasu Episode 3 (TBS, 2015), Ai Kazami
- Majisuka Gakuen 4 (2015) as Diva
- Majisuka Gakuen 5 (2015) as Snake
- AKB Horror Night: Adrenaline's Night Ep.4 - Wrong Number (2015)
- Gekijōrei Kara no Shōtaijō Episode 5 (2015) as Haruka Ishizuka
- AKB Love Night: Love Factory Ep.14 - Right Hook Girlfriend (2016) as Misa

=== Stages ===
- Musical AKB49: Ren'ai Kinshi Jōrei (14–15 March 2015, Chunichi Theatre), Minori Urakawa/Minoru Urayama
- Hana Yori Dango The Musical (January–February 2016), Shizuka Tōdou

=== Anime ===
- Kizuna no Allele (2023) as Zoe

== Discography ==
=== Solo singles ===
- Alface (オルフェス) (October 13, 2017) Labels: Showroom Records
- Hikari Sasu (ひかりさす) (August 24, 2022) Labels: Zest

=== SKE48 ===
==== Singles ====
Year	No.	Title	Role	Notes
2012	8	"Kataomoi Finally"	B-side	Also sang on "Kyō made no Koto, Korekara no koto"
2012	9	"Aishite-love-ru!"	B-side	Sang on "Halation" as Selection 8 and "Me ga Itai Kurai Hareta Sora" as SKE48 5th Generation.
2012	10	"Kiss datte Hidarikiki"	B-side	Sang on "Tori wa Aoi Sora no Hate wo Shiranai" as Akagumi.
2013	11	"Choco no Dorei"	B-side	Sang on "Oikake Shadow" as Akagumi.
2013	12	"Utsukushii Inazuma"	A-side	First A-side. Also sang on "Shalalana Calendar" as Team E.
2013	13	"Sansei Kawaii!"	A-side	Also sang on "Michi wa Naze Tsuzuku no ka" as Aichi Toyota Senbatsu.
2014	14	"Mirai to wa?"	A-side	Also sang on "GALAXY of DREAMS" as the same-name-subgroup and "Machiawasetai" as Team E.
2014	15	"Bukiyō Taiyō"	A-side	Also sang on "Tomodachi no Mama de" as Selection 10 and "Sayonara Kinou no Jibun" as Team KII.
2014	16	"12 Gatsu no Kangaroo"	A-side	Also sang on "I love AICHI" as Aichi Toyota Senbatsu and "DA DA Machine Gun" as Team KII.
2015	17	"Coquettish Jūtai Chū"	A-side	Also sang on "Konya wa Join Us!" as Team KII, "Yoru no Kyoukasho" as Selection 17 and "Boku wa Shitteiru"
2015	18	"Mae Nomeri"	A-side	Also sang on "Shōsō ga Kono Boku o Dame ni Suru" as Team KII.
2016	19	"Chicken Line"	A-side	Also sang on "Kiss Position"
2016	20	"Kin no Ai, Gin no Ai"	A-side	Also sang on "Happy Rankings"
2017	21	"Igai ni Mango"	A-side	Also sang on "En wo Egaku" as Team KII and "Kiseki no Ryūseigun" as Passion For You Senbatsu.
2018	22	"Muishiki no Iro"	A-side	Also sang on "Yoake no Coyote" as Sagami Chain Senbatsu and "We're Growing Up" as Aichi Toyota Senbatsu.
2018	23	"Ikinari Punch Line"	A-side	Also sang on "Dareka no Mimi" as Team KII.
2018	24	"Stand by You"	A-side	Also sang on "Ketobashita Nochi de Kuchizuke wo" as Team KII, "Jimotomintachi yo" as Aichi Toyota Senbatsu and "Kamisama wa Misutenai"
2019	25	"Frustration"	A-side, center	
2020	26	"Sōyūtoko Aru yo ne?"	A-side	
2021	27	"Koiochi Flag"	A-side	
2021	28	"Ano Koro no Kimi wo Mitsuketa"	A-side	
2022	29	"Kokoro ni Flower"	A-side	Last single to participate.

==== Sub-Unit Singles ====
Koppu no Naka no Komorebi

- "Aishiteru to ka, Aishiteta to ka" / Furumarion
- "Otanoshimi wa ashita kara" / Aichi Toyota Senbatsu

==== Albums ====
Year	No.	Title	Participated song
2012	1	Kono Hi no Chime o Wasurenai	"Mitsubachi Girl" as Team E; "Ponytail to Shushu" as Team E
2017	2	Kakumei no Oka	"Natsu yo, Isoge!"; "Horizon" as Aichi Toyota Senbatsu; "Ai no Tame ni Nani wo Suteru?"

=== AKB48 ===
==== Singles ====
Year	No.	Title	Role	Notes
2012	27	"Gingham Check"	B-side	Sang on "Ano Hi no Fuurin" as Waiting Girls.
2013	30	"So Long!"	B-side	Sang on "Waiting Room" as Under Girls.
2013	31	"Sayonara Crawl"	B-side	Sang on "Bara no Kajitsu" as Under Girls.
2013	33	"Heart Electric"	B-side	Sang on "Kaisoku to Doutai Shiryoku" as Under Girls and "Sasemeyuki Regret" as Team K.
2013	34	"Suzukake no Ki no Michi de "Kimi no Hohoemi o Yume ni Miru" to Itte Shimattara Bokutachi no Kankei wa Dō Kawatte Shimau no ka, Bokunari ni Nan-nichi ka Kangaeta Ue de no Yaya Kihazukashii Ketsuron no Yō na Mono"	A-side	First AKB48 A-side. Placed 15th in Rock paper scissors tournament. Also Sang on "Escape" as SKE48.
2014	35	"Mae Shika Mukanee"	B-side	Sang on "Kimi no Uso wo Shitteita" as Beauty Giraffes.
2014	36	"Labrador Retriever"	A-side	Also sang on "Kimi wa Kimagure" as Team A.
2014	37	"Kokoro no Placard"	B-side	Ranked 55th in 2014 General Election. Sang on "Seikaku ga Warui Onna no Ko" as Future Girls.
2014	38	"Kibouteki Refrain"	B-side	Sang on "Juujun na Slave" as Team A and "Ambulance" as Yurigumi.
2015	39	"Green Flash"	B-side	Sang on "Sekai ga Naiteru Nara" as SKE48.
2015	41	"Halloween Night"	B-side	Ranked 24th in 2015 General Election. Sang on "Sayonara Surfboard" as Under Girls.
2016	43	"Kimi wa Melody"	B-side	Sang on "Gonna Jump" as SKE48.
2016	45	"LOVE TRIP / Shiawase wo Wakenasai"	B-side	Ranked 29th in 2016 General Election. Sang on "Densetsu no Sakana" as Under Girls.
2016	46	"High Tension"	B-side	Sang on "Mata Anata no Koto wo Kangaeteta" as Team Vocal.
2017	47	"Shoot Sign"	B-side	Sang on "Vacancy" as SKE48.
2017	48	"Negaigoto no Mochigusare"	A-side	Also sang on "Anogoro no Gohyaku Yen Dama"
2017	49	"#SukiNanda"	A-side	Ranked 14th in 2017 General Election. Also sang on "Give Up wa Shinai" as Tofu Pro Wrestling.
2018	51	"Jabaja"	B-side	Sang on "Ai no Moake" as SKE48.
2018	53	"Sentimental Train"	A-side	Ranked 15th in 2018 General Election.
2018	54	"No Way Man"	B-side	Sang on "Soredemo Kanojo wa" as Otona Senbatsu.

==== Albums ====
Year	No.	Title	Participated song
2012	4	1830m	"Aozora yo Sabishikunai ka?"
2014	5	Tsugi no Ashiato	"10 Krone to Pan"; "Kyouhansha" as Team K
2015	6	Koko ga Rhodes da, Koko de Tobe!	"Oh! Baby!" as Team A; "Koko ga Rhodes da, Koko de Tobe!"
2017	8	Thumbnail	"Subete wa Tochuu Keika"
