= High Tension (song) =

2016 single by AKB48

Single by AKB48

from the album Thumbnail
- A-side: "High Tension"
- B-side: Osae Kirenai Shoudou; Happy End (type A); Better (type B); Hoshizora o Kimi ni (type C); Shishunki no Adrenaline (type D); Junjō Tired (type E); Mata Anata no Koto o Kangaeteta (theater edition)
- Released: November 16, 2016
- Genre: J-pop; club music; hip-hop
- Label: You, Be Cool! / King; Genie Music; Stone Music Entertainment
- Songwriter(s): Yasushi Akimoto (lyrics); Satori Shiraishi (music); Hiroshi Sasaki (arrangement)
- Producer(s): Yasushi Akimoto

AKB48 singles chronology
"Love Trip / Shiawase wo Wakenasai" (2016)	"High Tension" (2016)	"Shoot Sign" (2017)

Music video
- High Tension on YouTube

High Tension (ハイテンション, Hai Tenshon) is the 46th single by Japanese idol girl group AKB48. It was released on November 16, 2016 through You, Be Cool!/King Records. This is the final single appearance of Haruka Shimazaki, who left the group shortly after the release. The single's choreography is also centered by Shimazaki. The title song is used as the theme song of their drama Cabasuka Gakuen premiered on October 30, 2016 and was used for one of the team battles during Produce 48's group battle stage.

The single's title is an example of Wasei-eigo and refers to a state of high excitement instead of any of the usual meanings of "tension" in English.

== Track listing ==
=== Type-A ===
CD
No.	Title	Length
1.	"High Tension (ハイテンション)"
2.	"Osae Kirenai Shoudou (抑えきれない衝動)" (performed by Waiting Circle)
3.	"Happy End (ハッピーエンド)" (performed by Renacchiizu)
4.	"High Tension" (off vocal ver.)
5.	"Osae Kirenai Shoudou" (off vocal ver.)
6.	"Happy End" (off vocal ver.)

DVD
No.	Title	Length
1.	"High Tension (ハイテンション) Music Video"
2.	"Osae Kirenai Shoudou (抑えきれない衝動) Music Video"
3.	"Happy End (ハッピーエンド) Music Video"

=== Type-B ===
CD
No.	Title	Length
1.	"High Tension (ハイテンション)"
2.	"Osae Kirenai Shoudou (抑えきれない衝動)" (performed by Waiting Circle)
3.	"Better" (Haruka Shimazaki's graduation song)
4.	"High Tension" (off vocal ver.)
5.	"Osae Kirenai Shoudou" (off vocal ver.)
6.	"Better" (off vocal ver.)

DVD
No.	Title	Length
1.	"High Tension (ハイテンション) Music Video"
2.	"Osae Kirenai Shoudou (抑えきれない衝動) Music Video"
3.	"Better Music Video"

=== Type-C ===
CD
No.	Title	Length
1.	"High Tension (ハイテンション)"
2.	"Osae Kirenai Shoudou (抑えきれない衝動)" (performed by Waiting Circle)
3.	"Hoshizora o Kimi ni (星空を君に)" (performed by Team 8 EAST)
4.	"High Tension" (off vocal ver.)
5.	"Osae Kirenai Shoudou" (off vocal ver.)
6.	"Hoshizora o Kimi ni" (off vocal ver.)

DVD
No.	Title	Length
1.	"High Tension (ハイテンション) Music Video"
2.	"Osae Kirenai Shoudou (抑えきれない衝動) Music Video"
3.	"Hoshizora o Kimi ni (星空を君に) Music Video"

=== Type-D ===
CD
No.	Title	Length
1.	"High Tension (ハイテンション)"
2.	"Osae Kirenai Shoudou (抑えきれない衝動)" (performed by Waiting Circle)
3.	"Shishunki no Adrenaline (思春期のアドレナリン)" (performed by Team 8 WEST)
4.	"High Tension" (off vocal ver.)
5.	"Osae Kirenai Shoudou" (off vocal ver.)
6.	"Shishunki no Adrenaline" (off vocal ver.)

DVD
No.	Title	Length
1.	"High Tension (ハイテンション) Music Video"
2.	"Osae Kirenai Shoudou (抑えきれない衝動) Music Video"
3.	"Shishunki no Adrenaline (思春期のアドレナリン) Music Video"

=== Type-E ===
CD
No.	Title	Length
1.	"High Tension (ハイテンション)"
2.	"Osae Kirenai Shoudou (抑えきれない衝動)" (performed by Waiting Circle)
3.	"Junjō Tired (清純タイアド)" (performed by Tentoumu Chu!)
4.	"High Tension" (off vocal ver.)
5.	"Osae Kirenai Shoudou" (off vocal ver.)
6.	"Junjō Tired" (off vocal ver.)

DVD
No.	Title	Length
1.	"High Tension (ハイテンション) Music Video"
2.	"Osae Kirenai Shoudou (抑えきれない衝動) Music Video"
3.	"Junjō Tired (清純タイアド) Music Video"

=== Theater edition ===
CD
No.	Title	Length
1.	"High Tension (ハイテンション)"
2.	"Osae Kirenai Shoudou (抑えきれない衝動)" (performed by Waiting Circle)
3.	"Mata Anata no Koto o Kangaeteta (また あなたのことを考えてた)" (performed by Team Vocal)
4.	"High Tension" (off vocal ver.)
5.	"Osae Kirenai Shoudou" (off vocal ver.)
6.	"Mata Anata no Koto o Kangaeteta" (off vocal ver.)

== Senbatsu members ==
=== "High Tension" ===
The center performer is Haruka Shimazaki.

- AKB48 Team A: Anna Iriyama, Haruna Kojima, Haruka Shimazaki (center, last single), Yui Yokoyama
- Team K: Mion Mukaichi
- Team B: Yuki Kashiwagi, Rena Katō, Yuria Kizaki, Mayu Watanabe
- Team 4: Nana Okada, Saya Kawamoto, Mako Kojima, Haruka Komiyama, Juri Takahashi
- Team 8: Yui Oguri
- SKE48 Team S: Jurina Matsui
- NMB48 Team N: Sayaka Yamamoto
- HKT48 Team H: Haruka Kodama, Rino Sashihara
- Team KIV: Sakura Miyawaki
- Team TII: Hana Matsuoka
- NGT48 Team NIII: Rika Nakai

=== "Osae Kirenai Shoudou" ===
This song was performed by this single's unit, Waiting Circle which consists of the following members:

- Team A: Megu Taniguchi, Yui Hiwatashi
- Team K: Tomu Muto
- Team B: Ryoka Oshima, Moe Gotō, Seina Fukuoka (center)
- Team 4: Yuiri Murayama
- Team 8: Narumi Kurano, Nanami Yamada, Nagisa Sakaguchi
- Kenkyusei: Satone Kubo, Kira Takahashi

=== "Happy End" ===
This song is performed by this single's unit Renacchis, a unit that was created on "Renacchi's Sousenkyo" made by member Rena Katō as a joke on the app "755".

- Team A: Natsuki Kojima
- Team K: Yūka Tano, Mion Mukaichi, Mogi Shinobu
- Team B: Ryoka Oshima, Rena Katō, Yuria Kizaki
- Team 4: Ayaka Okada,
- Team 8: Yui Oguri (center), Kurena Cho
- Team KII: Yumana Takagi
- Team E: Sumire Sato
- Team BII: Miori Ichikawa
- Team H: Natsumi Tanaka
- Team TII: Hana Matsuoka
- Team NIII: Rika Nakai, Maho Yamaguchi

=== "Better" ===
This song serves as Haruka Shimazaki's graduation song, with the Senbatsu members being her good friends from AKB48's 9th Generation.

- Team A: Haruka Shimazaki (center), Mariko Nakamura, Yui Yokoyama
- Team K: Haruka Shimada
- Team B: Miyu Takeuchi
- Team S: Suzuran Yamauchi
- Team KII: Mina Oba
- Graduates: Mariya Nagao

=== "Hoshizora no Kimi ni" ===
This song is performed by Team 8 EAST, with members belonging from the eastern region of Japan, where their prefectures belong.

- Team 8: Mei Abe, Yui Oguri (center), Erina Oda, Nagisa Sakaguchi (center), Akari Sato, Shiori Sato, Nanami Sato, Maria Shimizu, Ayane Takahashi, Hijiri Tanikawa, Kurena Cho, Haruna Hashimoto, Yuna Hattori, Tsumugi Hayasaka, Ayaka Hidaritomo, Hitomi Honda, Kasumi Mogi, Yuri Yokomichi, Yui Yokoyama, Nanase Yoshikawa, Hinano Noda, Hatsuka Utada

=== "Shishunki no Adrenaline" ===
This song is performed by Team 8 WEST, with members belonging from the western region of Japan, where their prefectures belong.

- Team 8: Mei Abe, Nao Ota, Momoka Onishi, Yurina Gyoten, Narumi Kuranoo (center), Miu Shitao, Karin Shimoaoki, Kaoru Takaoka, Yuri Tani, Ikumi Nakano, Serika Nagano, Sayuna Hama, Riona Hamamatsu, Kotone Hitomi, Natsuki Hirose, Rena Fukuchi, Rira Miyazato, Karen Yoshida, Moka Yaguchi, Nanami Yamada, Ruka Yamamoto, Miyu Yoshino, Misaki Terada

=== "Seijun Tired" ===
This song is sung by the unit "Tentoumu Chu!", which was originally a Kenkyuusei unit soon turned into active unit.

- Team 4: Nana Okada, Mako Kojima (center), Miki Nishino
- Team S: Ryoha Kitagawa
- Team BII: Nagisa Shibuya
- Team H: Meru Tashima
- Team KIV: Mio Tomonaga

=== "Mata Anata no Koto o Kangaeteta" ===
This song is sung by this single's unit Team Vocal, who are known to be the best vocalists of their Teams.

- Team A: Miho Miyazaki
- Team K: Yūka Tano, Minami Minegishi (center)
- Team 8: Erina Oda
- Team S: Rion Azuma, Suzuran Yamauchi
- Team KII: Akane Takayanagi, Nao Furuhata
- Team N: Natsuko Akashi
- Team M: Miru Shiroma
- Team TII: Erena Sakamoto

== Release history ==
Region	Date	Format	Label
Japan	November 16, 2016	CD; digital download; streaming	King Records (YOU BE COOL division)
Hong Kong, Taiwan	November 16, 2016	CD; digital download; streaming	King Records
South Korea	September 7, 2018	digital download; streaming	Stone Music Entertainment; Genie Music; King

== MNL48 version ==
"High Tension"

Single by MNL48
- Released: 25 November 2019
- Genre: P-Pop; J-pop
- Length: 26:22
- Label: Star Music
- Producer(s): Yasushi Akimoto; Yasunari Okada; Paulo Kurusawa

MNL48 singles chronology
"Ikaw ang Melody" (2019)	"High Tension" (2019)	"River" (2020)

Music video
- "High Tension" on YouTube

The Filipino idol group MNL48, a sister group of AKB48, covered the song with the same title. It is their Fifth single released on November 25, 2019.

=== Tracklisting ===
- **Bold** indicates centers.

No.	Title	Performers	Length
1.	"High Tension"	Team MII: Alice Margarita De Leon, Ashley Nicole Somera, Dana Yzabel Divinagracia, Faith Shanrae Santiago, Francinne Rifol, Lorelaine Sañosa, Maria Jamie Beatrice Alberto, Shekinah Arzaga Team NIV: Abelaine Trinidad, Aubrey Ysabelle Delos Reyes, Jhona Alyanah Padillo Team L: Chelsey Yssacky Bautista, Dian Marie Mercado, **Gabrielle Skribikin**, Kaede Ishiyama, Marsela Mari Guia	3:47
2.	"1!2!3!4! YOROSHIKU! ("1!2!3!4! NICE TO MEET YOU!")"	Team NIV: Abelaine Trinidad, Alyssa Nicole Garcia, **Aubrey Binuya**, Aubrey Ysabelle Delos Reyes, **Coleen Trinidad**, Daniella Mae Palmero, Daryll Matalino, Ericka Joyce Sibug, Jemimah Caldejon, Jennifer Nandy Villaruel, Jhona Alyanah Padillo, Lara Mae Layar, Loulle Angelyn Villaflores, Miho Hoshino, Ruther Marie Lingat, Valerie Joyce Daita	5:04
3.	"Green Flash"	Team MII: Alice Margarita De Leon, Ashley Nicole Somera, Dana Yzabel Divinagracia, Faith Shanrae Santiago, Francinne Rifol, Lorelaine Sañosa, Maria Jamie Beatrice Alberto, Shekinah Arzaga Team NIV: Abelaine Trinidad, Aubrey Ysabelle Delos Reyes, Jhona Alyanah Padillo Team L: **Chelsey Yssacky Bautista**, Dian Marie Mercado, **Gabrielle Skribikin**, Kaede Ishiyama, Marsela Mari Guia	4:30
4.	"High Tension" (Off Vocal Version)		3:47
5.	"1!2!3!4! YOROSHIKU!" (Off Vocal Version)		5:04
6.	"Green Flash" (Off Vocal Version)		4:30
Total length:			26:22
