= Bukiyō Taiyō =

- Bukiyou Taiyou Type A Limited Edition Cover

Single by SKE48
- Released: July 30, 2014 (Japan)
- Genre: J-pop
- Label: Avex Trax

SKE48 singles chronology
"Mirai to wa?" (2014)	"Bukiyō Taiyō" (2014)	"12 Gatsu no Kangarū" (2014)

"Bukiyō Taiyō" (不器用太陽) is the 15th single by SKE48. It was released on July 30, 2014. It debuted in number one on the weekly Oricon Singles Chart. It was the second best-selling single in July. It has sold a total of 409,535 copies. It reached number one on the Billboard Japan Hot 100. It was the 14th best-selling single of the year in Japan, with 461,539 copies.

== Track listing ==
=== TYPE-A ===
CD
No.	Title	Artist(s)	Length
1.	"Bukiyō Taiyō" (不器用太陽)		5:11
2.	"Houkago Race" (放課後レース)	Team S	3:48
3.	"Coming soon"	Boat Pier Senbatsu	5:47
4.	"Tomodachi no Mama de" (友達のままで)	Selection 10	4:02
5.	"Bukiyō Taiyō (Off vocal)"
6.	"Houkago Race (Off vocal)"
7.	"Coming soon (Off vocal)"
8.	"Tomodachi no Mama de (Off vocal)"

DVD
No.	Title	Length
1.	"Bukiyō Taiyō (Music Video)"
2.	"Houkago Race (Music Video)"
3.	"Bonus Video "Team S no Kiseki ～SKE48 Hatsu no Sokaku (2013.4.13) →Zepp Nagoya（2014.5.12）~" documentary movie"

=== TYPE-B ===
CD
No.	Title	Artist(s)	Length
1.	"Bukiyō Taiyō" (不器用太陽)		5:11
2.	"Sayonara Kinou no Jibun" (サヨナラ 昨日の自分)	Team KII	3:49
3.	"Coming soon"	Boat Pier Senbatsu	5:47
4.	"Tomodachi no Mama de" (友達のままで)	Selection 10	4:02
5.	"Bukiyō Taiyō (Off vocal)"
6.	"Sayonara Kinou no Jibun (Off vocal)"
7.	"Coming soon (Off vocal)"
8.	"Tomodachi no Mama de (Off vocal)"

DVD
No.	Title	Length
1.	"Bukiyō Taiyō (Music Video)"
2.	"Sayonara Kinou no Jibun (Music Video)"
3.	"Bonus Video "Team KII no Kiseki ～SKE48 Hatsu no Sokaku (2013.4.13) →Zepp Namba（2014.5.13）~" documentary movie"

=== TYPE-C ===
CD
No.	Title	Artist(s)	Length
1.	"Bukiyō Taiyō" (不器用太陽)		5:11
2.	"Banana Kakumei" (バナナ革命)	Team E	4:05
3.	"Coming soon"	Boat Pier Senbatsu	5:47
4.	"Tomodachi no Mama de" (友達のままで)	Selection 10	4:02
5.	"Bukiyō Taiyō (Off vocal)"
6.	"Banana Kakumei (Off vocal)"
7.	"Coming soon (Off vocal)"
8.	"Tomodachi no Mama de (Off vocal)"

DVD
No.	Title	Length
1.	"Bukiyō Taiyō (Music Video)"
2.	"Banana Kakumei (Music Video)"
3.	"Bonus Video "Team E no Kiseki ～SKE48 Hatsu no Sokaku (2013.4.13) →Zepp Sapporo（2014.5.13）~" documentary movie"

=== TYPE-D ===
CD
No.	Title	Artist(s)	Length
1.	"Bukiyō Taiyō" (不器用太陽)		5:11
2.	"Koi Yori mo Dream" (恋よりもDream)	Dasu, Tsuma & Nita	4:46
3.	"Coming soon"	Boat Pier Senbatsu	5:47
4.	"Tomodachi no Mama de" (友達のままで)	Selection 10	4:02
5.	"Bukiyō Taiyō (Off vocal)"
6.	"Koi Yori mo Dream (Off vocal)"
7.	"Coming soon (Off vocal)"
8.	"Tomodachi no Mama de (Off vocal)"

DVD
No.	Title	Length
1.	"Bukiyō Taiyō (Music Video)"
2.	"Koi Yori mo Dream (Music Video)"
3.	"Bonus Video "SKE48 Shin Team Iseki ・ Kennin Member no Kiseki ~Nananin Sorezore no Shintenchi e no Chousen~" documentary movie"

=== Theater Edition ===
CD
No.	Title	Artist(s)	Length
1.	"Bukiyō Taiyō" (不器用太陽)		5:11
2.	"Coming soon"	Boat Pier Senbatsu	5:47
3.	"Tomodachi no Mama de" (友達のままで)	Selection 10	4:02
4.	"SKE48 15th Single Medley"
5.	"Bukiyō Taiyō (Off vocal)"
6.	"Coming soon (Off vocal)"
7.	"Tomodachi no Mama de (Off vocal)"

== Members ==
=== Bukiyō Taiyō ===
Team S: Rion Azuma, Masana Oya, Ryoha Kitagawa, Haruka Futamura, Jurina Matsui, Sae Miyazawa, Miyuki Watanabe
Team KII: Mina Oba, Akane Takayanagi, Airi Furukawa, Nao Furuhata, Nana Yamada
Team E]: Tsugumi Iwanaga, Madoka Umemoto, Kanon Kimoto, Haruka Kumazaki, Sumire Sato, Aya Shibata, Akari Suda, Rena Matsui

=== Coming soon ===
Team KII: Mina Oba, Akane Takayanagi, Airi Furukawa
Team E: Sumire Sato, Aya Shibata, Akari Suda, Rena Matsui
Kenkyuusei: Kaori Matsumura

=== Tomodachi no Mama de ===
Team S: Rion Azuma, Ryoha Kitagawa, Jurina Matsui
Team KII: Mina Oba, Akane Takayanagi, Airi Furukawa, Nao Furuhata
Team E: Kanon Kimoto, Akari Suda, Rena Matsui

=== Houkago Race ===
Team S: Rion Azuma, Masana Oya, Ryoha Kitagawa, Risako Goto, Mieko Sato, Mai Takeuchi, Natsumi Tanaka, Rika Tsuzuki, Yuka Nakanishi, Haruka Futamura, Jurina Matsui, Chikako Matsumoto, Sae Miyazawa, Ami Miyamae, Miki Yakata, Suzuran Yamauchi, Miyuki Watanabe

=== Sayonara Kinou no Jibun ===
Team KII: Riho Abiru, Yuki Arai, Anna Ishida, Mikoto Uchiyama, Yuna Ego, Mina Oba, Tomoko Kato, Ruka Kitano, Yukiko Kinoshita, Saki Goudo, Sarina Souda, Yumana Takagi, Natsuki Takatsuka, Akane Takayanagi, Yuzuki Hidaka, Airi Furukawa, Nao Furuhata, Honoka Mizuno, Yukari Yamashita, Nana Yamada, Mizuho Yamada

=== Banana Kakumei ===
Team E: Kyoka Isohara, Narumi Ichino, Tsugumi Iwanaga, Madoka Umemoto, Arisa Owaki, Rumi Kato, Kanon Kimoto, Haruka Kumazaki, Kumiko Koishi, Ami Kobayashi, Makiko Saito, Mei Sakai, Sumire Sato, Aya Shibata, Akari Suda, Sana Takatera, Marika Tani, Nao Fukushi, Rena Matsui, Reika Yamada

=== Koi Yori mo Dream ===
Team E: Akari Suda, Marika Tani
Kenkyuusei: Kaori Matsumura
