= Aya Shibata =

Aya Shibata 柴田 阿弥
- Also known as: Ayachan
- Born: 1 April 1993 (age 33)
- Origin: Aichi Prefecture, Japan
- Genres: J-pop
- Occupations: Idol; announcer; singer
- Instruments: Vocals; Piano
- Years active: 2010 – present
- Label: AKS
- Formerly of: SKE48

Aya Shibata (柴田 阿弥, Shibata Aya; born 1 April 1993 in Aichi Prefecture) is a former member of the Japanese idol girl group SKE48. She was a member of SKE48's Team E.

She started her career as an announcer after graduation from SKE48.

== Career ==
Shibata passed SKE48's 4th generation auditions in September 2010. Her audition song was "Stay with me" by Kaoru Amane. On December 6, 2010, she was selected to form Team E.

She went on a hiatus from February 2011 to March 2011.

In April 2013, during SKE48's shuffle, Shibata was transferred to Team KII. Later in June 2013, she ranked for the first time in AKB48's general elections, placing 17th with 39-739 votes. Her first SKE48 Senbatsu was for the single "Sansei Kawaii!".

In February 2014, during the AKB48 Group Shuffle, it was announced she would be transferred back to Team E. In AKB48's 2014 general elections, she placed 15th with 39-264 votes.

Her future dream is to be a talent.

On 26 August 2016, her graduation concert, titled "Shibata Aya Sotsugyō Kanshasai: Demo Aya-chan Kara wa Sotsugyō Shimasen!" was held at Zepp Nagoya. Her last theater performance was held at SKE48 Theater on August 31, 2016.

== Discography ==
=== SKE48 singles ===
Year	No.	Title	Role	Notes
2010	4	"1! 2! 3! 4! Yoroshiku!"	B-side	Sang on "Cosmos no Kioku" and "Soba ni Isasete"
2011	6	"Pareo wa Emerald"	B-side	Sang on "Tsumiki no Jikan" and "Tokimeki no Ashiato" as Shirogumi
2011	7	"Oki Doki"	B-side	Sang on "Hatsukoi no Fumikiri" and "Bazooka Hō Hassha!" as Shirogumi
2012	8	"Kataomoi Finally"	B-side	Also sang on "Kyō made no Koto, Korekara no koto" and "Hanikami Lollipop" as Shirogumi
2012	9	"Aishite-love-ru!"	B-side	Sang on "Aun no Kiss" as Shirogumi
2012	10	"Kiss datte Hidarikiki"	B-side	Sang on "Taiikukan de Asashoku wo" as Shirogumi
2013	11	"Choco no Dorei"	B-side	Sang on "Fuyu no Kamemo" as Shirogumi
2013	12	"Utsukushii Inazuma"	B-side	Sang on "Futari Dake no Parade" as Team KII
2013	13	"Sansei Kawaii!"	A-side	First SKE48 A-side. Also sang on "Michi wa Naze Tsuzuku no ka" as Aichi Toyota Senbatsu and "Zutto Zutto Saki no Kyou" as Selection 18.
2014	14	"Mirai to wa?"	A-side, Center	Also sang on "GALAXY of DREAMS" as the same-name-subgroup and "S-ko to Uso Hakkenki" as Team KII.
2014	15	"Bukiyō Taiyō"	A-side	Also sang on "Coming soon" and "Banana Kakumei" as Team E.
2014	16	"12 Gatsu no Kangaroo"	A-side	Also sang on "I love AICHI" as Aichi Toyota Senbatsu and "Seishun Curry Rice" as Team E.
2015	17	"Coquettish Jūtai Chū"	A-side	Also sang on "Boku wa Shitteiru" and "Oto o Keshita Terebi" as Team E.
2015	18	"Mae Nomeri"	A-side	Also sang on "Nagai Yume no Labyrinth" as Team E.
2016	19	"Chicken Line"	A-side	Also sang on "Is That Your Secret?" as Team E and "Tabi no Tochū"
2016	20	"Kin no Ai, Gin no Ai"	A-side	Also sang on "Sayonara ga Utsukushikute"

=== AKB48 singles ===
Year	No.	Title	Role	Notes
2012	27	"Gingham Check"	B-side	Sang on "Ano Hi no Fuurin"
2013	32	"Koi Suru Fortune Cookie"	B-side	Ranked 17th in 2013 General Election. Sang on "Ai no Imi wo Kangaetemita"
2013	34	"Suzukake no Ki no Michi de "Kimi no Hohoemi o Yume ni Miru" to Itte Shimattara Bokutachi no Kankei wa Dō Kawatte Shimau no ka, Bokunari ni Nan-nichi ka Kangaeta Ue de no Yaya Kihazukashii Ketsuron no Yō na Mono"	B-side	Sang on "Escape"
2014	35	"Mae Shika Mukanee"	B-side	Sang on "KONJO"
2014	37	"Kokoro no Placard"	A-side	Ranked 15th in 2014 General Election.
2014	38	"Kibouteki Refrain"	B-side	Sang on "Utaitai"
2015	39	"Green Flash"	B-side	Sang on "Sekai ga Naiteru Nara"
2015	41	"Halloween Night"	A-side	Ranked 15th in 2015 General Election.
2016	43	"Kimi wa Melody"	B-side	Sang on "Gonna Jump"

== Appearances ==
=== Dramas ===
- Fortune Cookies (Fuji TV, 2013)
- AKB Horror Night Adrenalin's Night Episode 18 (TV Asahi, 2015)
