= Green Flash (song) =

- Type A Limited Edition Cover

Single by AKB48

from the album 0 to 1 no Aida
- B-side: "Majisuka Fight"; "Haru no Hikari Chikadzuita Natsu"; "Yankee Rock"; "Sekai ga Naiteru Nara"; "Hakimono to Kasa no Monogatari"; "Punkish"; "Aisatsu kara Hajimeyou"; "Otona Ressha"; "Hatsukoi no Oshibe"
- Released: March 4, 2015
- Genre: J-pop; R&B; Rap
- Length: 4:35
- Label: You, Be Cool! / King
- Songwriter(s): Yasushi Akimoto (lyrics)

AKB48 singles chronology
"Kibōteki Refrain" (2014)	"Green Flash" (2015)	"Bokutachi wa Tatakawanai" (2015)

Music video
- AKB48 "Green Flash" on YouTube

"Green Flash" is the 39th single by the Japanese idol girl group AKB48, released in Japan on March 4, 2015. This single was first revealed during the group's Request Hour 2015 concert.

The single sold 860,269 copies on the first day. It sold 1,001,393 copies in its first week, achieving number 1 on Oricon's Weekly Charts. This single is the 20th consecutive million seller single, and the 21st overall. This single is also the 26th consecutive one that topped Oricon's charts, breaking Ayumi Hamasaki's record of 25 consecutive singles.

On 9 February 2025, Thai version of "Green Flash" has been sung by the members of BNK48.

== Background ==
Yuki Kashiwagi and Haruna Kojima are the center performers for this single. This is Kashiwagi's first time being a center performer since her debut 9 years ago. This single is a medium-tempo one, with Minami Takahashi and Sayaka Yamamoto rapping in the song.

This single is released in 5 types: Type A (Limited/Regular), Type S (Limited/Regular), Type N (Limited/Regular), Type H (Limited/Regular) and Theater edition.

== Tie-in ==
"Majisuka Fight" is the theme song for the group's TV drama show Majisuka Gakuen 4. "Yankee Rock" is the ending theme song.

"Hakimono to Kasa no Monogatari" was a song that was used for NHK program Minna no Uta in 2015. The music video depicts the story of two grandmothers who run neighboring shops: one that sells shoes, and the other umbrellas.

== Artwork ==
The cover art for each CD single features head shots of four members from the 16 girls who sang on the title track. In the limited editions, the girls are looking downward, as if they were watching a sunset, and with tears streaming from their eyes. In the regular editions, the girls look directly at the camera, but still have tears in their eyes.

Edition	Members in cover picture	Ref
Type A	Haruna Kojima, Yuki Kashiwagi, Jurina Matsui, Sakura Miyawaki	
Type S	Minami Takahashi, Sayaka Yamamoto, Rina Kawaei, Haruka Shimazaki	
Type N	Rino Sashihara, Yui Yokoyama, Yuria Kizaki, Rina Ikoma	
Type H	Mayu Watanabe, Anna Iriyama, Mako Kojima, Rena Matsui	
Theater Edition	Haruna Kojima, Yuki Kashiwagi	

== Track listing ==
=== Type A ===
All lyrics are written by Yasushi Akimoto

CD: KIZM-323, KIZM-90323
No.	Title	Music	Performance	Length
1.	"Green Flash"	Carlos K. (composer); Hiroshi Sasaki (arranger)		4:28
2.	"Majisuka Fight" (マジすかFight)	Tomonori Inoue (composer); Kushita Mine (arranger)		4:07
3.	"Haru no Hikari Chikadzuita Natsu" (春の光 近づいた夏, Light of Spring Summer is Near)	Amber (composer); Yo Keigo (arranger)	AKB48	4:54
4.	"Green Flash" (off vocal ver.)	Carlos K. (composer); Hiroshi Sasaki (arranger)		4:28
5.	"Majisuka Fight" (off vocal ver.)	Tomonori Inoue (composer); Kushita Mine (arranger)		4:07
6.	"Haru no Hikari Chikadzuita Natsu" (off vocal ver.)	Amber (composer); Yo Keigo (arranger)		4:54
Total length:				25:78

DVD: KIZM-324, KIZM-90324
No.	Title	Director	Length
1.	"Green Flash Music Video"	Hirokazu Kore-eda	4:48
2.	"Majisuka Fight Music Video" (マジすかFight Music Video)		4:09
3.	"Haru no Hikari Chikadzuita Natsu Music Video" (春の光 近づいた夏 Music Video)		4:54

=== Type S ===
All lyrics are written by Yasushi Akimoto

CD: KIZM-325, KIZM-90325
No.	Title	Music	Performance	Length
1.	"Green Flash"	Carlos K. (composer); Hiroshi Sasaki (arranger)		4:28
2.	"Yankee Rock" (ヤンキーロック)	Chalaza (composer); Yuichi "Masa" Nonaka (arranger)		4:10
3.	"Sekai ga Naiteru Nara" (世界が泣いてるなら, If the World is Crying)	Yuma Kawashima (composer); Yuchi "Masa" Nonoka (arranger)	SKE48	3:27
4.	"Green Flash" (off vocal ver.)	Carlos K. (composer); Hiroshi Sasaki (arranger)		4:28
5.	"Yankee Rock" (off vocal ver.)	Chalaza (composer); Yuichi "Masa" Nonaka (arranger)		4:10
6.	"Sekai ga Naiteru Nara" (off vocal ver.)	Yuma Kawashima (composer); Yuchi "Masa" Nonoka (arranger)		3:27
Total length:				23:30

DVD: KIZM-326, KIZM-90326
No.	Title	Director	Length
1.	"Green Flash Music Video"	Hirokazu Kore-eda	4:48
2.	"Yankee Rock Music Video" (ヤンキーロック Music Video)		4:10
3.	"Sekai ga Naiteru Nara Music Video" (世界が泣いてるなら Music Video)		4:00

=== Type N ===
All lyrics are written by Yasushi Akimoto

CD: KIZM-327, KIZM-90327
No.	Title	Music	Performance	Length
1.	"Green Flash"	Carlos K. (composer); Hiroshi Sasaki (arranger)		4:28
2.	"Hakimono to Kasa no Monogatari" (履物と傘の物語, Story of Footwear and Umbrella)	Shutaro Katagiri		4:51
3.	"Punkish" (パンキッシュ)	Mami Nishijima, Takeru Rikimaru	NMB48	3:40
4.	"Green Flash" (off vocal ver.)			4:28
5.	"Hakimono to Kasa no Monogatari" (off vocal ver.)	Shutaro Katagiri		4:51
6.	"Punkish" (off vocal ver.)			3:40
Total length:				24:38

DVD: KIZM-328, KIZM-90328
No.	Title	Music	Director	Length
1.	"Green Flash Music Video"		Hirokazu Koreeda	4:48
2.	"Hakimono to Kasa no Monogatari" (履物と傘の物語 Music Video)	Shutaro Katagiri		4:51
3.	"Punkish Music Video" (パンキッシュ Music Video)			4:31

=== Type H ===
All lyrics are written by Yasushi Akimoto

CD: KIZM-329, KIZM-90329
No.	Title	Music	Performance	Length
1.	"Green Flash"	Carlos K. (composer); Hiroshi Sasaki (arranger)		4:28
2.	"Aisatsu Kara Hajimeyou" (挨拶から始めよう, Let's start from Greetings)	Yuuki Kimura	Team 8	4:10
3.	"Otona Ressha" (大人列車, Adult Train)	Daisuke Toyama (composer); Yuichi "Masa" Nonaka (arranger)	HKT48	4:13
4.	"Green Flash" (off vocal ver.)	Carlos K. (composer); Hiroshi Sasaki (arranger)		4:28
5.	"Aisatsu kara Hajimeyou" (off vocal ver.)	Yuuki Kimura		4:10
6.	"Otona Ressha" (off vocal ver.)	Daisuke Toyama (composer); Yuichi "Masa" Nonaka (arranger)		4:13
Total length:				25:02

DVD: KIZM-330, KIZM-90330
No.	Title	Director	Length
1.	"Green Flash Music Video"	Hirokazu Kore-eda	4:48
2.	"Aisatsu kara Hajimeyou Music Video" (挨拶から始めよう Music Video)		4:13
3.	"Otona Ressha Music Video" (大人列車 Music Video)		10:28

=== Theater edition ===
All lyrics are written by Yasushi Akimoto

CD: NMAX-1186
No.	Title	Music	Performance	Length
1.	"Green Flash"	Carlos K. (composer); Hiroshi Sasaki (arranger)		4:28
2.	"Hakimono to Kasa no Monogatari" (履物と傘の物語, Story of Footwear and Umbrella)			4:51
3.	"Hatsukoi no Oshibe" (初恋のおしべ)		Tentoumu Chu! & Kabutomu Chu!	4:13
4.	"Green Flash" (off vocal ver.)	Carlos K. (composer); Hiroshi Sasaki (arranger)		4:28
5.	"Hakimono to Kasa no Monogatari" (off vocal ver.)	Shutaro Katagiri		4:51
6.	"Hatsukoi no Oshibe" (off vocal ver.)			4:13
Total length:				25:84

== Personnel ==
=== "Green Flash" ===
The performers for the main single was posted with the group's short music video. The center performers are Haruna Kojima and Yuki Kashiwagi.

- Yuki Kashiwagi (AKB48 Team B / NMB48 Team N)
- Haruna Kojima (AKB48 Team A)
- Minami Takahashi (AKB48 Team A)
- Sayaka Yamamoto (NMB48 Team N / AKB48 Team K)
- Mayu Watanabe (AKB48 Team B)
- Rino Sashihara (HKT48 Team H)
- Yui Yokoyama (AKB48 Team K)
- Rena Matsui (SKE48 Team E / Nogizaka46)
- Sakura Miyawaki (HKT48 Team KIV / AKB48 Team A)
- Jurina Matsui (SKE48 Team S / AKB48 Team K)
- Rina Kawaei (AKB48 Team A)
- Haruka Shimazaki (AKB48 Team A)
- Rina Ikoma (Nogizaka 46 / AKB48 Team B)
- Yuria Kizaki (AKB48 Team 4)
- Mako Kojima (AKB48 Team K)
- Anna Iriyama (AKB48 Team A)

=== "Majisuka Fight" ===
The performers for the song are: Anna Iriyama, Rina Kawaei, Yuria Kizaki, Haruka Shimazaki, Minami Takahashi, Sakura Miyawaki, Sayaka Yamamoto, Yui Yokoyama and Miyuki Watanabe.

=== "Haru no Hikari Chikadzuita Natsu" ===
The performers for the song are: Anna Iriyama, Nana Owada, Yuki Kashiwagi, Rena Kato, Rina Kawaei, Saya Kawamoto, Yuria Kizaki, Rie Kitahara, Haruna Kojima, Mako Kojima, Haruka Shimazaki, Minami Takahashi, Minami Minegishi, Mion Mukaichi, Yui Yokoyama, and Mayu Watanabe.

=== "Yankee Rock" ===
The performers for the song are: Natsuki Uchiyama, Ryoka Oshima, Nana Owada, Rena Kato, Mako Kojima, Miru Shiroma, Akari Suda, Juri Takahashi, Natsuki Uchiyama, Kaori Matsumura, Mion Mukaichi and Fuuko Yagura

=== "Sekai ga Naiteru Nara" ===
The performers for the song are: Rion Azuma, Yuna Ego, Mina Oba, Ryoha Kitagawa, Kanon Kimoto, Sumire Sato, Aya Shibata, Akari Suda, Akane Takayanagi, Marika Tani, Airi Furukawa, Nao Furuhata, Jurina Matsui, Rena Matsui, Sae Miyazawa, and Ami Miyamae.

=== "Hakimono to Kasa no Monogatari" ===
The performers for the song are Minami Takahashi, Haruna Kojima, Mayu Watanabe, Haruka Shimazaki, Jurina Matsui, Rino Sashihara, Yuki Kashiwagi and Yui Yokoyama.

=== "Punkish" ===
The performers for the song are: Miori Ichikawa, Ayaka Umeda, Yuuka Kato, Riho Kotani, Nagisa Shibuya, Kei Jonishi, Miru Shiroma, Airi Tanigawa, Reina Fujie, Sae Murase, Fuuko Yagura, Shū Yabushita, Nana Yamada, Sayaka Yamamoto, Akari Yoshida, and Miyuki Watanabe.

=== "Aisatsu kara Hajimeyou" ===
The performers for the song are: Nagisa Sakaguchi, Yui Yokoyama, Hijiri Tanaka, Nanami Sato, Tsumugi Hayasaka, Akari Sato, Kasumi Mougi, Rin Okabe, Hitomi Honda, Ayane Takahashi, Nanase Yoshikawa, Yui Oguri, Erina Oda, Shiori Sato, Ayaka Hidaritomo, Natsuki Fujimura, Yuri Yokomichi, Yuno Hattori, Ai Yamamoto, Haruna Hashimoto, Reina Kita, Kurena Cho, Moeri Kondo, Serika Nagano, Nao Ota, Nanami Yamada, Ruka Yamamoto, Onishi Momoka, Sayuna Hama, Ikumi Nakano, Mei Abe, Kotone Hitomi, Yuri Tani, Miu Shitao, Riona Hamamatsu, Yurina Tyoten, Kaoru Takaoka, Natsuki Hirose, Rena Fukuchi, Moeka Iwasaki, Narumi Kuranoo, Miyu Yoshino, Moka Yaguchi, Karin Shimoaoki, and Rira Miyazato.

=== "Otona Ressha" ===
The performers for the song are: Yuka Akiyoshi, Chihiro Anai, Aika Ota, Haruka Kodama, Hiroka Komada, Riko Sakaguchi, Rino Sashihara, Meru Tashima, Miku Tanaka, Asuka Tomiyoshi, Mio Tomonaga, Natsumi Matsuoka, Sakura Miyawaki, Aoi Motomura, Madoka Moriyasu, and Nako Yabuki.

=== "Hatsukoi no Oshibe" ===
The performers for the song are from Tentoumu Chu! and Kabotumu Chu!:

- Nana Okada, Ryoha Kitagawa, Mako Kojima, Nagisa Shibuya, Meru Tashima, Mio Tomonaga, Miki Nishino
- Natsuki Uchiyama, Hikari Hashimoto, Mizuki Maeda

== Charts ==
Chart (2015)	Peak position
Billboard Japan Hot 100	1
Oricon Daily Singles Chart	1
Oricon Weekly Singles Chart	1
