= 12 Gatsu no Kangaroo =

- 12-gatsu no Kangaroo Cover Type A Limited Edition Cover

Single by SKE48
- Released: December 10, 2014 (Japan)
- Label: Avex Trax

SKE48 singles chronology
"Bukiyō Taiyō" (2014)	"12 Gatsu no Kangaroo" (2014)	"Coquettish Jūtai Chū" (2015)

"12 Gatsu no Kangaroo" (12月のカンガルー; December's Kangaroo) is the 16th single by Japanese idol girl group SKE48. It was released on December 10, 2014. It debuted in number one on the weekly Oricon Singles Chart and, as of December 22, 2014 (issue date), has sold 386,495 copies. It also reached number two on the Billboard Japan Hot 100.

Due to restrictions from Avex Trax, only a short version is available on SKE48 Official Channel. Full version MV is included only in limited editions, and wasn't released on YouTube.

== Track listing ==
=== TYPE-A ===
CD
No.	Title	Artist(s)	Length
1.	"12 Gatsu no Kangaroo" (12月のカンガルー)		4:08
2.	"Kesenai Honoo" (消せない炎)	Team S	5:12
3.	"I love AICHI"	Aichi Toyota Senbatsu	5:47
4.	"12 Gatsu no Kangaroo (Off vocal)"
5.	"Kesenai Honoo (Off vocal)"
6.	"I love AICHI (Off vocal)"

DVD
No.	Title	Length
1.	"12 Gatsu no Kangaroo (Music Video)"
2.	"Kesenai Honoo (Music Video)"
3.	"Bonus Video "SKE48 Shuushin Meiyo Kenkyuusei / AKB48 Group Kenkyuusei Kai Kaichou Matsumura Kaori ~Matsumura Kaori teki Idol no Aishikata~" documentary movie"

=== TYPE-B ===
CD
No.	Title	Artist(s)	Length
1.	"12 Gatsu no Kangaroo" (12月のカンガルー)		4:08
2.	"DADA Machine Gun" (DA DA マシンガン)	Team KII	4:06
3.	"I love AICHI"	Aichi Toyota Senbatsu	5:47
4.	"12 Gatsu no Kangaroo (Off vocal)"
5.	"DADA Machine Gun (Off vocal)"
6.	"I love AICHI (Off vocal)"

DVD
No.	Title	Length
1.	"12 Gatsu no Kangaroo (Music Video)"
2.	"DADA Machine Gun (Music Video)"
3.	"Bonus Video "Gekijou Debut 6shuunen Tokubetsu Kouen (2014.10.05)-Zenpen-" live movie"

=== TYPE-C ===
CD
No.	Title	Artist(s)	Length
1.	"12 Gatsu no Kangaroo" (12月のカンガルー)		4:08
2.	"Seishun Curry Rice" (青春カレーライス)	Team E	3:51
3.	"I love AICHI"	Aichi Toyota Senbatsu	5:47
4.	"12 Gatsu no Kangaroo (Off vocal)"
5.	"Seishun Curry Rice (Off vocal)"
6.	"I love AICHI (Off vocal)"

DVD
No.	Title	Length
1.	"12 Gatsu no Kangaroo (Music Video)"
2.	"Seishun Curry Rice (Music Video)"
3.	"Bonus Video "Gekijou Debut 6shuunen Tokubetsu Kouen (2014.10.05)-Chuuhen-" live movie"

=== TYPE-D ===
CD
No.	Title	Artist(s)	Length
1.	"12 Gatsu no Kangaroo" (12月のカンガルー)		4:08
2.	"Ai no Rule" (愛のルール)	Sentai Hero Unit	3:39
3.	"I love AICHI"	Aichi Toyota Senbatsu	5:47
4.	"12 Gatsu no Kangaroo (Off vocal)"
5.	"Ai no Rule (Off vocal)"
6.	"I love AICHI (Off vocal)"

DVD
No.	Title	Length
1.	"12 Gatsu no Kangaroo (Music Video)"
2.	"Ai no Rule (Music Video)"
3.	"Bonus Video "Gekijou Debut 6shuunen Tokubetsu Kouen (2014.10.05)-Kouhen-" live movie"

=== Theater Edition ===
CD
No.	Title	Artist(s)	Length
1.	"12 Gatsu no Kangaroo" (12月のカンガルー)		4:08
2.	"I love AICHI"	Aichi Toyota Senbatsu	5:47
3.	"SKE48 16th Single Medley"
4.	"12 Gatsu no Kangaroo (Off vocal)"
5.	"I love AICHI (Off vocal)"

== Members ==
=== 12 Gatsu no Kangaroo ===
Team S: Rion Azuma, Masana Oya, Ryoha Kitagawa, Haruka Futamura, Jurina Matsui, Ami Miyamae, Sae Miyazawa, Miyuki Watanabe, Suzuran Yamauchi
Team KII: Mina Oba, Akane Takayanagi, Airi Furukawa, Nao Furuhata, Sarina Souda, Nana Yamada
Team E: Tsugumi Iwanaga, Kanon Kimoto, Marika Tani, Sumire Sato, Aya Shibata, Akari Suda, Rena Matsui

=== Kesenai Honoo ===
Team S: Rion Azuma, Asana Inuzuka, Masana Oya, Ryoha Kitagawa, Risako Goto, Mieko Sato, Mai Takeuchi, Natsumi Tanaka, Rika Tsuzuki, Yuka Nakanishi, Yume Noguchi, Haruka Futamura, Jurina Matsui, Chikako Matsumoto, Sae Miyazawa, Ami Miyamae, Miki Yakata, Suzuran Yamauchi, Miyuki Watanabe

=== DADA Machine Gun ===
Team KII: Riho Abiru, Yuki Arai, Anna Ishida, Mikoto Uchiyama, Yuna Ego, Mina Oba, Ruka Kitano, Saki Goudo, Sarina Souda, Yumana Takagi, Natsuki Takatsuka, Akane Takayanagi, Yuzuki Hidaka, Airi Furukawa, Nao Furuhata, Honoka Mizuno, Yukari Yamashita, Nana Yamada, Mizuho Yamada

=== Seishun Curry Rice ===
Team E: Kyoka Isohara, Narumi Ichino, Tsugumi Iwanaga, Madoka Umemoto, Arisa Owaki, Rumi Kato, Kanon Kimoto, Haruka Kumazaki, Kumiko Koishi, Ami Kobayashi, Makiko Saito, Mei Sakai, Sumire Sato, Aya Shibata, Akari Suda, Sana Takatera, Marika Tani, Nao Fukushi, Rena Matsui

=== Ai no Rule ===
Team KII: Mina Oba, Akane Takayanagi, Airi Furukawa
Team E: Sumire Sato
