= Marika Tani =

- 谷 真理佳
- Born: 5 January 1996 (age 30); Fukuoka Prefecture, Japan
- Other name: Marika
- Occupations: Voice actress Formerly: Idol; singer
- Years active: 2012 – present
- Agent(s): Zest, Inc.
- Musical career
- Genres: J-pop
- Instruments: Vocals; Piano
- Years active: 2012–2024
- Formerly of: HKT48; SKE48

Marika Tani (谷 真理佳, Tani Marika; born 5 January 1996 in Fukuoka Prefecture) is a former member of the Japanese idol girl group SKE48. She is a former member of HKT48's Team KIV and now currently a member of SKE48's Team E. She is represented by Zest, Inc.

== Career ==
Tani passed HKT48's second generation auditions on 23 June 2012. Her debut was on 23 September 2012 at HKT48's Team H stage performance. Her debut stage performance was on 30 September 2012, at HKT48's Kenkyusei Stage.

Tani was first selected for HKT48's general election for the single Melon Juice. On 11 January 2014, Tani was promoted to newly formed Team KIV during HKT48's Concert. However, in February 2014, during the AKB48 Group Shuffle, it was announced she would be transferred to SKE48's Team E. Her last HKT48 activity was on 21 April 2014, during the last day of HKT48's Kenkyusei Stage. She started activities as a Team E member in May 2014.

After her transfer to SKE48, Tani featured on two A-sides, "12 Gatsu no Kangaroo" and "Coquettish Jūtai Chū". In 2015, she participated in AKB48's 41st single general election, and ranked 23rd with 26,051 votes, for her first ever ranking.

On 24 January 2024, at SKE48's Team E 6th Stage, Tani announced her graduation from SKE48. She graduated on 31 March of the same year, at Tokyo Joshi Pro-Wrestling's Grand Princess '24 event. The following day, she became fully affiliated with the talent agency Zest Inc. and would continue her entertainment career as a voice actress.

== Discography ==
=== SKE48 singles ===
Year	No.	Title	Role	Notes
2014	15	"Bukiyō Taiyō"	B-side	Sang on "Banana Kakumei" and "Koi Yori mo Dream"
2014	16	"12 Gatsu no Kangaroo"	A-side	First SKE48 A-side. Also sang on "I Love Aichi" as Aichi Toyota Senbatsu and "Seishun Curry Rice" as Team E
2015	17	"Coquettish Jūtai Chū"	A-side	Also sang on "Oto o Keshita Terebi" as Team E
2015	18	"Maenomeri"	A-side	Also sang on "Nagai Yume no Labyrinth" as Team E.
2016	19	"Chicken LINE"	A-side	Also sang on "Is that your secret?" as Team E.
2016	20	"Kin no Ai, Gin no Ai"	A-side	Also sang on "Happy Rankings"
2017	21	"Igai ni Mango"	B-side	Sang on "Oretoku" as Team E.
2018	22	"Muishiki no Iro"	B-side	Sang on "Because Docchitsukazu"
2018	23	"Ikinari Punch Line"	B-side	Sang on "Otona no Sekai" and "Kimi wa Ramune" as Team E.
2018	24	"Stand by You"	B-side	Sang on "Kamisama wa Misutenai" and "Iriguchi" as Team E.
2019	25	"Frustration"	B-side	Sang on "Ano Hi no Secret Base" with Shirogumi.
2020	26	"Sōyūtoko Aru yo ne?"	B-side	Sang on "Straight na Junjō"
2021	27	"Koiochi Flag"	A-side	
2021	28	"Anogoro no Kimi wo Mitsuketa"	B-side	Sang on "Sekai no Superhero"
2022	29	"Kokoro ni Flower"	B-side	Sang on "Nakama yo"
2022	30	"Zettai Inspiration"	B-side	Sang on "Kataomoi Forever"
2023	31	"Suki ni Nacchatta"	B-side	Sang on "Katariaukoto kara Hajime you"

=== HKT48 singles ===
Year	No.	Title	Role	Notes
2013	1	"Suki! Suki! Skip!"	B-side	Sang on "Ima ga Ichiban"
2013	2	"Melon Juice"	A-side	First HKT48 A-side
2014	3	"Sakura, Minnade Tabeta"	B-side	Sang on "Mukashi no Kareshi no Oniichan to Tsukiau to Iu Koto"
2014	4	"Hikaeme I Love You!"	B-side	Sang on "Ima Kimi o Omou"

=== AKB48 singles ===
Year	No.	Title	Role	Notes
2013	31	"Sayonara Crawl"	B-side	Sang on "Bara no Kajitsu" as Under Girls.
2014	35	"Mae Shika Mukanee"	B-side	Sang on "Konjo"
2014	38	"Kibouteki Refrain"	B-side	Sang on "Utaitai"
2015	39	"Green Flash"	B-side	Sang on "Yankee Rock" and "Sekai ga Naiteru Nara" as SKE48.
2015	41	"Halloween Night"	B-side, Under Girls	Ranked 23rd in 2015 General Election. Sang on "Sayonara Surfboard"
2016	43	"Kimi wa Melody"	B-side	Marked as the 10th Anniversary Single. Sang on "Gonna Jump" as SKE48
2016	45	"LOVE TRIP / Shiawase wo Wakenasai"	B-side, Future Girls	Ranked 55th in 2016 General Election. Sang on "Kishi ga Mieru Umi Kara"
2017	47	"Shoot Sign"	B-side	Sang on "Vacancy" as SKE48
2017	48	"Negaigoto no Mochigusare"	B-side	Sang on "Ima Para"
2017	49	"#SukiNanda"	B-side, Upcoming Girls	Ranked 66th in 2017 General Election. Sang on "Tsuki no Kamen"
2018	53	"Sentimental Train"	B-side	Ranked 89th in 2018 General Election. Sang on "Nami ga Tsutaeru Mono"

== Appearances ==
=== Stage units ===
HKT48 Kenkyusei Stage "Party ga Hajimaru yo" (PARTYが始まるよ)

1. "Classmate"

HKT48 Himawarigumi Stage "Pajama Drive" (パジャマドライブ)

1. "Pajama Drive" (パジャマドライブ)

HKT48 Kenkyusei Stage "Nonai Paradise" (脳内パラダイス)

1. "Kurukurupa" (くるくるぱー)

SKE48 Team E 4th Stage "Te o Tsunaginagara" (手をつなぎながら)

1. "Ame no Pianist" (雨のピアニスト)

=== TV variety ===
- HKT48 no Odekake! (HKT48のおでかけ！)
- SKE48 Ebishow! (SKE48 エビショー！)(2014)
- SKE48 Ebicalcio! (SKE48 エビカルチョ！)(2014－2015)

=== TV dramas ===
- Tsuna Girl: Ashitani Yell (ツナガール ～明日にエール～) (2013)
- Himitsu (秘密) (2013)
- Majisuka Gakuen 4 (マジすか学園4) (2015), KY
- Majisuka Gakuen 5 (マジすか学園5) (2015), KY

=== Radio ===
- SKE48 1×1wa1janaiyo! (SKE48♥1×1は1じゃないよ!) (2014), personality
- Nagaoka×Scramble (ナガオカ×スクランブル) (2015－), assistant
