= Ami Miyamae =

Ami Miyamae 宮前 杏実
- Also known as: Ami
- Born: 9 September 1997 (age 28)
- Origin: Aichi Prefecture, Japan
- Genres: J-pop
- Occupations: Idol; singer
- Years active: 2011 – present
- Labels: AKS

Ami Miyamae (宮前 杏実, Miyamae Ami; born 9 September 1997) is a Japanese singer who is a former member of the idol girl group SKE48. She was a member of SKE48's Team S.

== Biography ==
Miyamae was born in Aichi Prefecture.

Miyamae passed SKE48's 5th generation auditions in October 2011. Her debut was on November 26, 2011. On April 13, 2013, she was promoted to Team E during SKE48's shuffle. She started activities as a Team E member in July 2013.

In February 2014, during the AKB48 Group Shuffle, it was announced she would be transferred to Team S. She first entered SKE48's Senbatsu for the single 12 Gatsu no Kangaroo. In this single, Miyamae and Ryoha Kitagawa were appointed the centers. This is the first time Jurina Matsui is not the center.

On September 28, 2016, her graduation concert was held at SKE48 theater. Her last activity date as SKE48 was set for September 30.

== Discography ==
=== SKE48 singles ===
Year	No.	Title	Role	Notes
2012	8	"Kataomoi Finally"	B-side	Sang on "Kyou Made no Koto, Korekara no Koto"
2012	9	"Aishite-love-ru!"	B-side	Sang on "Me ga Itai Kurai Hareta Sora"
2012	10	"Kiss Datte Hidarikiki"	B-side	Sang on "Atto Iu Ma no Shoujo"
2013	11	"Choco no Dorei"	B-side	Sang on "Fuyu no Kamome"
2013	12	"Utsukushii Inazuma"	B-side	Sang on "Shalala na Calendar" as Team E
2013	13	"Sansei Kawaii!"	B-side	Sang on "Itsunomanika, Yowaimonoijime"
2014	14	"Mirai to wa?"	B-side	Sang on "Machiawasetai" as Team E
2014	15	"Bukiyō Taiyō"	B-side	Sang on "Houkago Race" as Team S
2014	16	"12 Gatsu no Kangaroo"	A-side, center	Also sang on "Kesenai Honō" as Team S
2015	17	"Coquettish Jūtai Chū"	A-side	Also sang on "Dirty" as Team S, "Boku wa Shitteiru" and "Yoru no Kyoukasho"
2015	18	"Mae Nomeri"	B-side	Sang on "Suteki na Zaiakukan" as Team S
2016	19	"Chicken Line"	B-side	Sang on "Kanojo ga Iru" as Team S
2016	20	"Kin no Ai, Gin no Ai"	B-side	Sang on "Happy rankings"

=== AKB48 singles ===
Year	No.	Title	Role	Notes
2012	27	"Gingham Check"	B-side	Sang on "Ano Hi no Fuurin"
2015	39	"Green Flash"	B-side	Sang on "Sekai ga Naiteru Nara"
2015	41	"Halloween Night"	B-side	Sang on "Mizu no Naka no Dendōritsu"
2016	45	"Love Trip / Shiawase wo Wakenasai"	B-side	Sang on "2016 Nen no Invitation"

== Appearances ==
=== Stage units ===
SKE48 Kenkyuusei Stage "PARTY ga Hajimaru yo" (PARTYが始まるよ)

1. ""Skirt, Hirari" (スカート、ひらり)"

SKE48 Kenkyuusei Stage "Aitakatta" (会いたかった)

1. ""Nageki no Figure" (嘆きのフィギュア)"
2. ""Glass no I LOVE YOU" (ガラスの I LOVE YOU)"
3. ""Senaka Kara Dakishimete" (背中から抱きしめて)"

SKE48 Team E 3rd Stage "Boku no Taiyou" (僕の太陽)

1. "Boku to Juliet to Jet Coaster" (僕とジュリエットとジェットコースター)

SKE48 Team S 3rd Stage "Seifuku no Me" (制服の芽) (Revival)

1. "Mangekyou" (万華鏡)
