= Suzuran Yamauchi =

Japanese tarento (born 1994)

- 山内 鈴蘭
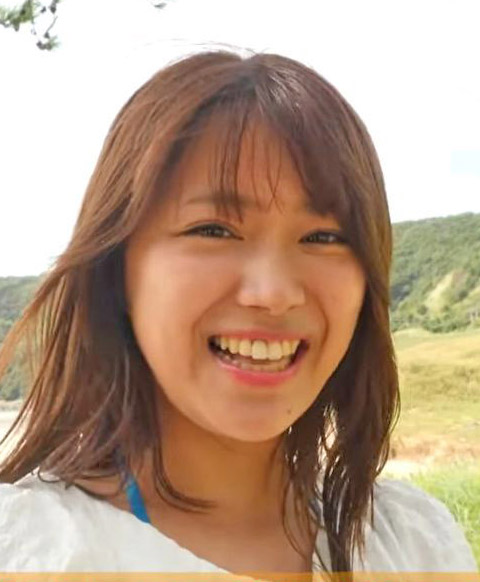
- Yamauchi in 2022
- Born: December 8, 1994 (age 31); Ichihara, Chiba Prefecture, Japan
- Other name: Ranran (らんらん)
- Occupation: Tarento
- Years active: 2009–present
- Agent: Horipro
- Spouse: unknown (m. 2026)
- Musical career
- Genres: J-pop
- Instrument: Vocals
- Years active: 2009–2021
- Formerly of: AKB48 (2009–2014); SKE48 (2014–2021)

YouTube information
- Channel: Suzuran Golf Channel
- Years active: 2021–present
- Genres: Vlog; sports
- Subscribers: 64,700
- Views: 19.5 million
- Last updated: 4 August 2026

Suzuran Yamauchi (山内 鈴蘭, Yamauchi Suzuran; born December 8, 1994, in Ichihara, Chiba Prefecture, Japan) is a Japanese tarento who is represented by the talent agency Horipro. She is a former member of Team S of the female idol group SKE48, and is a former member of its senior group AKB48.

Aside from being an idol, Yamauchi is an avid golfer and has been part of several golf television shows. Her best score so far is 80. She has played from a young age and aimed to become a professional golf player in the future like her parents; Masahiro Kuramoto, a pro golfer who was partnered with her in a pro-am tournament in 2011, commented that she had the potential. One of her mentors was former pro golfer Miho Koga.

On October 7, 2021, Yamauchi announced her graduation from SKE48. She officially graduated from the group on November 30, at the SKE48 Theater.

After graduation, Yamauchi hopes to become a golf coach while continuing entertainment activities as a tarento. Unfortunately, on June 9, 2022, she announced that she had failed the first stage of the teaching license examination course of the PGA of Japan.

On July 1, 2022, Yamauchi opened her own golf studio, Choco. The golf studio has its own Italian restaurant, BeleMoco.

On January 2, 2024, Yamauchi announced that she has passed a caddy training course.

== Personal life ==
On May 1, 2026, Yamauchi announced that she had gotten married.

== Discography ==
=== Singles ===
AKB48

Title	Notes
"Ponytail to Shushu"	Team Kenkyūsei "Boku no Yell"
"Heavy Rotation"	Team Kenkyūsei "Namida no See-Saw Game"
"Chance no Junban"	Team Kenkyūsei "Fruit Snow"
"Sakura no Ki ni Narō"	Team Kenkyūsei "Ōgon Center"
"Everyday, Katyusha"	"Yankee Seoul"; Team Kenkyūsei "Anti"
"Flying Get"	
"Kaze wa Fuiteiru"	Under Girls "Kimi no Senaka"; Team4+Kenkyūsei "Tsubomitachi"
"Ue kara Mariko"	Team 4 "Hashire! Penguin"
"Give Me Five!"	Special Girls A "New Ship"
"Manatsu no Sounds Good!"	
"Gingham Check"	Future Girls "Show fight!"
"Uza"	New Team B "Seigi no Mikata ja Nai Hero"
"Eien Pressure"	"Watashitachi no Reason"
"So Long!"	Team B "Sokode Inu no Unchi Funjau kane?"
"Sayonara Crawl"	Team B "Romance Kenjū"
"Koi Suru Fortune Cookie"	Future Girls "Suitei Marmalade"
"Heart Electric"	Under Girls "Kaisoku to Doutai Shiryoku"; Team B "Tiny T-shirt"
"Mae shika Mukanee"	Talking Chimpanzees "Konjo"
"Kokoro no Placard"	Upcoming Girls "Chewing Gum no Aji ga Naku Naru Made"
"Kibōteki Refrain"	Katareagumi "Utaitai"
"Halloween Night"	Future Girls "Kimi ni Wedding Dress o..."
"Love Trip / Shiawase o Wakenasai"	Upcoming Girls "2016 Nen no Invitation"
"High Tension"	AKB48 9th Generation "Better"; Team Vocal "Mata Anata no Koto o Kangaeteta"
"Negaigoto no Mochigusare"	"Tenmetsu Pheromone"

SKE48

Title	Notes
"Bukiyō Taiyō"	Team S "Houkago Race"
"12 Gatsu no Kangaroo"	Team S "Kesenai Honoo"
"Coquettish Jūtai Chū"	Team S "Dirty"; "Yoru no Kyoukasho"
"Mae Nomeri"	Team S "Suteki na Zaiakukan"
"Chicken Line"	Team S "Kanojo ga Iru"
"Kin no Ai, Gin no Ai"	Ranking Girls "Happy Rankings"
"Igai ni Mango"	Team S "Party ni wa Ikitakunai"
"Muishiki no Iro"	Kosanger 7 "Because Docchitsukazu"
"Ikinari Punch Line"	Team S "Parting Shot"; B・LAVIERE "Otona no Sekai"
"Stand By You"	"Kamisama wa Misutenai"; "Team S "Kogoeru Mae ni"
"Frustration"	SKE48 Akagumi "Jinsei no Mudazukai"
"Sōyūtoko Aru yo ne?"	Jewel Box "Straight na Junjōu"
"Koiochifuragu"	
"Anogoro no Kimi wo Mitsuketa"	"Sekai no Superhero"

=== Albums ===
AKB48

Title	Notes
Koko ni Ita Koto	Team Kenkyūsei "High School Days"; AKB48 + SKE48 + SDN48 + NMB48 "Koko ni Ita Koto"
1830m	"First Rabbit"; Team 4 "Chokkaku Sunshine"; AKB48 + SKE48 + NMB48 + HKT48 "Aozora yo Sabishikunai Ka?"
Tsugi no Ashiato	"Taningyōgi na Sunset Beach"; "Ponkotsu Blues"; Team B "Kanashiki Kinkyori Renai"
Koko ga Rhodes da, Koko de Tobe!	AKB48 + SKE48+ NMB48 + SNH48 "Ikitsuzukeru"

==== SKE48 ====
Title	Notes
Kakumei no Oka	"Zero Base"

==== Other ====
Year	Title	Notes
2011	Ojarumaru Sisters "Hatsukoi wa Minoranai"	Ending theme of NHK anime, Ojarumaru

=== Theater performances ===
Title	Notes
Kenkyūsei: Idol no Yoake	"Kuchiutsushi no Chocolate"
Kenkyūsei: Renai Kinshi Jōrei	"Tsundere!"
Kenkyūsei: Theater no Megami	"Locker Room Boy"
Team B 5th Stage: Theater no Megami	"Romance Kakurenbo"; "Locker Room Boy"
Team A 6th Stage: Mokugeki-sha	"Miniskirt no Yōsei"
Team K 6th Stage: Reset	"Remon no Toshigoro"; "Kokoro no Hashi no Sofa"
Team 4 1st Stage: Boku no Taiyō	"Idoru Nante Yobanaide"; "Aishi-sa no Defense"
Umeda Team B Waiting	"Omoide Ijō"; "Gomen ne Jewel"
Team S 5th Stage: Seifuku no Me	"Omoide Ijō"; "Onnanoko no Dairokkan"

== Filmography ==
=== Drama ===
Year	Title	Role	Network	Notes
2010	Majisuka Gakuen	Umajisuka Jogakuen student	TV Tokyo	Final Episode
2011	Majisuka Gakuen 2	Tsuri	TV Tokyo	
2012	Majisuka Gakuen 3	Bunker	TV Tokyo	
2013	So Long!	Erina Shirasaka	NTV	Episode 3

=== Variety series ===
Year	Title	Network	Notes
2010	Ariyoshi AKB Kyōwakoku	TBS	Irregular appearances
2010	AKB48 Nemōsu TV	Family Gekijo	
2011	AKBingo!	NTV	Irregular appearances
2011	AKB48 Konto: Bimyo	Hikari TV Channel	
2012	AKB48 no Anta, Dare?	NOTTV	Irregular appearances
2012	Bimyo na Tobira AKB48 no Gachichare	Hikari TV Channel	
2013	Sports Paradise	SATV	
2013	World Touring Car Championship	TV Tokyo	

=== Golf series ===
Year	Title	Network	Notes
2011	Mitsui Sumitomo Visa Taiheiyo Masters	TBS	
2012	Golf Nadeshiko	TV Tokyo	
2013	PGA Tour	NHK G	
2014	Shigeo Nagashima Invitational Sega Sammy Cup	Ustream	
2015	SKE48 no Koi Suru Dorakon	Tokyo MX	

=== Stage performances ===
Year	Title	Role	Notes	Ref.
2013	Shippo no Nakama-tachi 3		The Galaxy Theatre	
2015	AKB49: Ren'ai Kinshi Jōrei	Sayuri Mayama	Chunichi Theatre	

=== Radio series ===
Year	Title	Network	Notes
2013	Listen?: Live 4 Life	NCB	
2014	SKE48 1+1 wa 2 Janai yo!	Tokai Radio	

=== Events ===
Year	Title	Notes
2012	Suzuran Yamauchi no "Ranran" Golf Kōza	AKB48 Cafe & Shop Akihabara Theater Area
2013	Horida Shimono (Kari) Vol.1: Watashitachiha Tettai Shimasen	Tokyo FM Hall
2013	Horida Shimono (Kari) Vol.2: Jan Ken wa Sumimasendeshita	Laforet Museum Roppongi
2013	Higashinihon Fukkō Shien Charity Concert: Song for You 2013	The Galaxy Theatre
2014	Tottori Marathon 2014	Tottori Sand Dunes, Tottori, Tottori / Tottori Prefectural Government
2014	Biratori Suzuran Kanshō-kai	Biratori, Hokkaido
2014	Horida Shimono (Kari) Vol.3: Tsuini Zōzeidearu	Shibuya Cultural Center Owada Sakura Hall
