= Mina Ōba =

Japanese singer and actress (born 1992)

- 大場 美奈
- Born: April 3, 1992 (age 34); Kanagawa Prefecture, Japan
- Occupations: Singer; actress
- Years active: 2009–2022
- Spouse: Shuta Ishikawa (m. 2023)
- Musical career
- Formerly of: AKB48; SKE48

Mina Ōba (大場 美奈, Ōba Mina; born April 3, 1992) is a former member of the Japanese idol girl group SKE48 of which she was captain of Team KII. Before, she was a member and captain of Team 4, but she was suspended due to her scandal and she returned in January 2012, she was transfer to Team B in 2012 when original Team 4 was disbanded in AKB48.

On October 9, 2021, Ōba announced that she will graduate from SKE48 and leave the idol industry in April 2022, the time of her 30th birthday. Her 3-part graduation concert was on April 1 to 3 (the final day being her 30th birthday celebration). Her final theater performance was on April 23. She was supposed to officially graduate from the group on April 30, but she tested positive for COVID-19 on April 29, the day before her planned graduation. Her graduation date was postponed to May 21.

== Personal life ==
On January 28, 2023, Oba announced her marriage to Fukuoka SoftBank Hawks baseball player Shuta Ishikawa.

== Discography ==
=== AKB48 singles ===
Year	No.	Title	Role	Notes
2010	16	"Ponytail to Shushu"	B-side	Sang on "Boku no Yell"
2010	19	"Chance no Junban"	B-side	Sang on "Fruit Snow"
2011	20	"Sakura no Ki ni Narō"	B-side	Sang on "Ōgon Center"
2011	21	"Everyday, Katyusha"	B-side	Sang on "Yankee Soul"
2011	22	"Flying Get"	B-side	Sang on "Dakishimecha Ikenai" and "Seishun to Kizukanai Mama"
2012	26	"Manatsu no Sounds Good!"	B-side	Sang on "Mitsu no Namida"
2012	27	"Gingham Check"	B-side	Sang on "Show fight!"
2012	28	"Uza"	B-side	Sang on "Seigi no Mikata ja Nai Hero"
2012	29	"Eien Pressure"	B-side	Sang on "Watashitachi no Reason"
2013	30	"So Long!"	B-side	Sang on "Sokode Inu no Unchi Funjau kane?" and "Waiting Room"
2013	31	"Sayonara Crawl"	B-side	Sang on "Romance Kenjū"
2013	32	"Koi Suru Fortune Cookie"	B-side	Sang on "Kondo Koso Ecstasy"
2013	33	"Heart Electric"	B-side	Sang on "Kaisoku to Doutai Shiryoku" and "Tiny T-shirt"
2013	34	"Suzukake Nanchara"	A-side	First A-side. Also sang on "Escape" as a concurrent member of SKE48
2014	35	"Mae shika Mukanee"	B-side	Sang on "Konjo"
2014	36	"Labrador Retriever"	A-side	
2014	37	"Kokoro no Placard"	B-side	Sang on "Seikaku ga Warui Onna no Ko"
2014	38	"Kibōteki Refrain"	B-side	Sang on "Utaitai"
2015	39	"Green Flash"	B-side	Sang on "Sekai ga Naiteru Nara"
2015	41	"Halloween Night"	B-side	Sang on "Sayonara Surfboard"
2016	43	"Kimi wa Melody"	B-side	Sang on "Gonna Jump"
2016	45	"Love Trip / Shiawase o Wakenasai"	B-side	Sang on "Densetsu no Sakana"
2016	46	"High Tension"	B-side	Sang on "Better", Haruka Shimazaki's graduation song
2017	47	"Shoot Sign"	B-side	Sang on "Vacancy"
2017	48	"Negaigoto no Mochigusare"	B-side	Sang on "Ima Para"
2017	49	"#sukinanda"	B-side	Sang on "Darashinai Aishikata"
2018	51	"Jabaja"	B-side	Sang on "Ai no Moake"
2018	53	"Sentimental Train"	A-side	
2018	54	"No Way Man"	B-side	Sang on "Soredemo Kanojo wa"

=== SKE48 singles ===
Year	No.	Title	Role	Notes
2013	12	"Utsukushii Inazuma"	A-side	First single with SKE48 as a concurrent member. Also sang on "Futari dake no Parade"
2013	13	"Sansei Kawaii!"	A-side	Also sang on "Zutto Zutto Saki no Kyou"
2014	14	"Mirai to wa?"	A-side	Last single as a concurrent member. Also sang on "S-ko to Usohakkenki"
2014	15	"Bukiyō Taiyō"	A-side	First single after she was fully moved to SKE48's Team KII. Also sang on "Coming soon", "Tomodachi no Mama de" and "Sayonara Kinou no Jibun"
2014	16	"12 Gatsu no Kangaroo"	A-side	Also sang on "DADA Machine Gun" and "Ai no Rule"
2015	17	"Coquettish Jūtai Chū"	A-side	Also sang on "Konya wa Join us!" and "Yoru no Kyoukasho"
2015	18	"Maenomeri"	A-side	Also sang on "Shozo ga kono Boku wo Damenisuru"
2016	19	"Chicken LINE"	A-side	Also sang on "Tabi no Tochuu" and "Kiss Position"
2016	20	"Kin no Ai, Gin no Ai"	A-side	Also sang on "Happy Rankings"
2017	21	"Igai ni Mango"	A-side	Also sang on "En wo Egaku" and "Kiseki no Ryuuseigun"
2018	22	"Muishiki no Iro"	A-side	Also sang on "Yoake no Coyote" and "We're Growing Up"
2018	23	"Ikinari Punch Line"	A-side	Also sang on "Dareka no Mimi" and "Hana no Kaori no Symphony "
2018	24	"Stand by You"	A-side	Also sang on "Ketobashita Nochi de Kuchizuke wo", "Jimotomintachi yo" and "Kamisama wa Misutenai"
2019	25	"Frustration"	A-side	Also sang on "Game Shimasen ka?"
2020	26	"Sōyūtoko Aru yo ne?"	A-side	
2021	27	"Koiochi Flag"	A-side	
2021	28	"Ano Koro no Kimi wo Mitsuketa"	A-side	
2022	29	"Kokoro ni Flower"	A-side	Last Single where she participated in. Also sang on "Umare Kawatte mo", her graduation song

== Television ==
- Majisuka Gakuen (2010)
- Hanazakari no Kimitachi e (2011)
- Majisuka Gakuen 2 (2011)
- Shiritsu Bakaleya Koukou (2012)
- Majisuka Gakuen 3 (2012)
- So Long! (2013)
- AKB Horror Night: Adrenaline's Night Ep.6 - Stain (2015)

== Filmography ==
- Shiritsu Bakaleya Kōkō (2012)
- Hell Girl (2019)
