= Coquettish Jūtai Chū =

- Coquettish Jūtai Chū Type A Limited Edition Cover

Single by SKE48
- Released: March 31, 2015 (Japan)
- Genre: J-Pop
- Length: 4:06
- Label: Avex Trax

SKE48 singles chronology
"12 Gatsu no Kangaroo" (2014)	"Coquettish Jūtai Chū" (2015)	"Mae Nomeri" (2015)

Music video
- SKE48 "Coquettish Jūtai Chū" on JPOPSUKI

"Coquettish Jūtai Chū" (コケティッシュ渋滞中) is the 17th single by Japanese idol girl group SKE48. It was released on March 31, 2015. This single and NMB48's Don't Look Back! were released on the same day, and SKE48 placed 1st in Oricon's Daily Charts on its first day with 573,074 copies sold.

== Background ==
This single was released in 9 versions: Type A (Limited/Regular), Type B (Limited/Regular), Type C (Limited/Regular), Type D (Limited/Regular) and Theater Edition. The title song was first performed on Music Station on February 20, 2015. Full song and music video wasn't leaked on social networks prior to single release.

== Track listing ==
=== TYPE-A ===
CD
No.	Title	Artist(s)	Length
1.	"Coquettish Jūtai Chū" (コケティッシュ渋滞中)
2.	"DIRTY"	Team S
3.	"Boku wa Shitteiru" (僕は知っている)
4.	"Coquettish Jūtai Chū (off-vocal)"
5.	"DIRTY (off-vocal)"
6.	"Boku wa Shitteiru (off-vocal)"

DVD
No.	Title	Length
1.	"Coquettish Jūtai Chū (Music Video)"
2.	"DIRTY (Music Video)"
3.	"Bonus Footage "SKE48 Fan Akushukai Stimulation""

=== TYPE-B ===
CD
No.	Title	Artist(s)	Length
1.	"Coquettish Jūtai Chū" (コケティッシュ渋滞中)
2.	"Konya wa Join us!" (今夜はJoin us!)	Team KII
3.	"Boku wa Shitteiru" (僕は知っている)
4.	"Coquettish Jūtai Chū (off-vocal)"
5.	"Konya wa Join us! (off-vocal)"
6.	"Boku wa Shitteiru (off-vocal)"

DVD
No.	Title	Length
1.	"Coquettish Jūtai Chū (Music Video)"
2.	"Konya wa Join us! (Music Video)"
3.	"Bonus Footage "SKE48 no Kami Tai Sokutei presented by BSFuji""

=== TYPE-C ===
CD
No.	Title	Artist(s)	Length
1.	"Coquettish Jūtai Chū" (コケティッシュ渋滞中)
2.	"Oto wo Keshita Terebi" (音を消したテレビ)	Team E
3.	"Boku wa Shitteiru" (僕は知っている)
4.	"Coquettish Jūtai Chū (off-vocal)"
5.	"Oto wo Keshita Terebi (off-vocal)"
6.	"Boku wa Shitteiru (off-vocal)"

DVD
No.	Title	Length
1.	"Coquettish Jūtai Chū (Music Video)"
2.	"Oto wo Keshita Terebi (Music Video)"
3.	"Bonus Footage "SKE48 Kenkyuusei no Mushashugyou ~Ice Skate Volume~"

=== TYPE-D ===
CD
No.	Title	Length
1.	"Coquettish Jūtai Chū" (コケティッシュ渋滞中)
2.	"Sakura, Oboete Itekure" (桜、覚えていてくれ)
3.	"Boku wa Shitteiru" (僕は知っている)
4.	"Coquettish Jūtai Chū (off-vocal)"
5.	"Sakura, Oboete Itekure (off-vocal)"
6.	"Boku wa Shitteiru (off-vocal)"

DVD
No.	Title	Length
1.	"Coquettish Jūtai Chū (Music Video)"
2.	"Sakura, Oboete Itekure (Music Video)"
3.	"Bonus Footage "Sotsugyou Documentary Nakama no Shi ~Sayonara no Yokogao~""

=== Theater Edition ===
CD
No.	Title	Length
1.	"Coquettish Jūtai Chū" (コケティッシュ渋滞中)
2.	"Yoru no Kyoukasho" (夜の教科書, Theme song for AKB49 Stage Play)
3.	"Boku wa Shitteiru" (僕は知っている)
4.	"SKE48 17th Single Medley"
5.	"Coquettish Jūtai Chū (off-vocal)"
6.	"Yoru no Kyoukasho (off-vocal)"
7.	"Boku wa Shitteiru (off-vocal)"

== Members ==
=== Coquettish Jūtai Chū ===
Team S: Rion Azuma, Masana Oya, Ryoha Kitagawa, Haruka Futamura, Jurina Matsui, Ami Miyamae, Sae Miyazawa
Team KII: Yuna Ego, Mina Oba, Saki Goudo, Akane Takayanagi, Nao Furuhata, Sarina Souda
Team E: Kyoka Isohara, Kanon Kimoto, Marika Tani, Sumire Sato, Aya Shibata, Akari Suda, Rena Matsui
Kenkyuusei: Kaori Matsumura

=== DIRTY ===
Team S: Rion Azuma, Asana Inuzuka, Masana Oya, Ryoha Kitagawa, Risako Goto, Mieko Sato, Mai Takeuchi, Natsumi Tanaka, Rika Tsuzuki, Yuka Nakanishi, Yume Noguchi, Haruka Futamura, Jurina Matsui, Chikako Matsumoto, Sae Miyazawa, Ami Miyamae, Miki Yakata, Suzuran Yamauchi

=== Boku wa Shitteiru ===
Team S: Masana Oya, Ryoha Kitagawa, Risako Goto, Mieko Sato, Yuka Nakanishi, Haruka Futamura, Jurina Matsui, Sae Miyazawa, Ami Miyamae, Miki Yakata
Team KII: Riho Abiru, Anna Ishida, Mikoto Uchiyama, Yuna Ego, Akane Takayanagi, Airi Furukawa, Nao Furuhata
Team E: Kyoka Isohara, Madoka Umemoto, Rumi Kato, Kanon Kimoto, Ami Kobayashi, Makiko Saito, Aya Shibata, Akari Suda, Rena Matsui
Kenkyuusei: Kaori Matsumura

=== Konya wa Join Us! ===
Team KII: Riho Abiru, Yuki Arai, Anna Ishida, Mikoto Uchiyama, Yuna Ego, Mina Oba, Ruka Kitano, Saki Goudo, Sarina Souda, Yumana Takagi, Natsuki Takatsuka, Akane Takayanagi, Yuzuki Hidaka, Airi Furukawa, Nao Furuhata, Yukari Yamashita

=== Oto wo Keshita Terebi ===
Team E: Kyoka Isohara, Narumi Ichino, Madoka Umemoto, Rumi Kato, Kanon Kimoto, Haruka Kumazaki, Kumiko Koishi, Ami Kobayashi, Makiko Saito, Mei Sakai, Sumire Sato, Aya Shibata, Akari Suda, Sana Takatera, Marika Tani, Nao Fukushi, Rena Matsui

=== Sakura, Oboete Itekure ===
Team S: Mieko Sato, Yuka Nakanishi
Team KII: Airi Furukawa

=== Yoru no Kyoukasho ===
Team S: Rion Azuma, Ryoha Kitagawa, Haruka Futamura, Ami Miyamae, Miki Yakata, Suzuran Yamauchi
Team KII: Mina Oba, Saki Goudo, Akane Takayanagi, Yuzuki Hidaka, Nao Furuhata
Team E: Madoka Umemoto, Rumi Kato, Haruka Kumazaki, Mei Sakai, Sumire Sato
Kenkyuusei: Juna Yamada
