= Ue kara Mariko =

"Ue Kara Mariko"

Single by AKB48

from the album 1830m
- B-side: "Noël no Yoru"; "Rinjin wa Kizutsukanai" (Type A); "Zero-sum Taiyō" (Type K); "Yobisute Fantasy" (Type B); "Hashire! Penguin" (Theater Edition)
- Released: December 7, 2011 (Japan)
- Recorded: 2011
- Genre: J-pop
- Length: 4:40
- Label: You, Be Cool! / King
- Songwriter(s): Yasushi Akimoto (lyrics)
- Producer(s): Yasushi Akimoto

AKB48 singles chronology
"Kaze wa Fuite Iru" (2011)	"Ue Kara Mariko" (2011)	"Give Me Five!" (2012)

Music videos
- Ue kara Mariko on YouTube
- Noël no Yoru (preview) on YouTube

"Ue Kara Mariko" (上からマリコ, "Mariko From Above") is the 24th major single by the Japanese girl idol group AKB48, released on December 7, 2011.

== Release history and information ==
The AKB48 members participating in the single were determined in the rock-paper-scissors tournament held on September 20, 2011, at Nippon Budokan, so called AKB48 24th Single Senbatsu Janken Taikai. The 16 members from the group who advanced into the semi-final and final rounds of the tournament are those that were featured in this single. From this, the Top 8 were chosen to be the main vocalists while member Mariko Shinoda, who came at first place in the tournament, is in the center position.

The single's title song was announced to be "Ue Kara Mariko" on October 29 at the Flying Get handshake event at Ajinomoto Stadium.

The single was released in 4 versions: Type A, Type K, Type B, and Theater Edition.

It has sold 959,280 copies on its first day and later on sold over 1 million by the end of its first week making it the fourth most successful single from the group to sell over a million.

== Concept and artwork ==
The name Mariko in "Ue Kara Mariko" ("Mariko from Above", "Mariko from the Top") refers to Mariko Shinoda, the member of the group whom the single will be centered around for the first time, having won the rock-paper-scissors tournament. This is also the first song by the group with a member name in the title. The words "ue kara" ("from above", "from the top") might be seen as referring either to Mariko being the eldest or the tallest in the group, or both.

It was also revealed that title song was originally planned to be "Hashire! Penguin" ("Penguin, Run!") but was changed to fit Mariko Shinoda's image. "Hashire! Penguin" was instead sung by Team 4 and appears only on the Theater Edition of the single.

== Track listing ==
=== Type A ===
CD
No.	Title	Music	Artist(s)	Length
1.	"Ue Kara Mariko" (上からマリコ)	Masahiro Kawaura		4:40
2.	"Noël no Yoru" (ノエルの夜)
3.	"Rinjin wa Kizutsukanai" (隣人は傷つかない)		Team A
4.	"Ue Kara Mariko (Off Vocal Ver.)" (上からマリコ off vocal ver.)	Masahiro Kawaura		4:40
5.	"Noël no Yoru (Off Vocal Ver.)" (ノエルの夜 off vocal ver.)
6.	"Rinjin wa Kizutsukanai (Off Vocal Ver.)" (隣人は傷つかない off vocal ver.)

DVD
No.	Title	Length
1.	"Ue Kara Mariko music video" (上からマリコ Music Video)
2.	"Noël no Yoru music video" (ノエルの夜 Music Video)
3.	"Rinjin wa Kizutsukanai music video" (隣人は傷つかない Music Video)
4.	"24 Single Senbatsu Janken Taikai Document Eizō (Zenpen)" (24thシングル 選抜じゃんけん大会ドキュメント映像（前編）)

=== Type K ===
CD
No.	Title	Music	Artist(s)	Length
1.	"Ue Kara Mariko" (上からマリコ)	Masahiro Kawaura		4:40
2.	"Noël no Yoru" (ノエルの夜)
3.	"Zero-sum Taiyō" (ゼロサム太陽)		Team K
4.	"Ue Kara Mariko (Off Vocal Ver.)" (上からマリコ off vocal ver.)	Masahiro Kawaura		4:40
5.	"Noël no Yoru (Off Vocal Ver.)" (ノエルの夜 off vocal ver.)
6.	"Zero-sum Taiyō (Off Vocal Ver.)" (ゼロサム太陽 off vocal ver.)

DVD
No.	Title	Length
1.	"Ue Kara Mariko music video" (上からマリコ Music Video)
2.	"Noël no Yoru music video" (ノエルの夜 Music Video)
3.	"Zero-sum Taiyō music video" (ゼロサム太陽 Music Video)
4.	"24 Single Senbatsu Janken Taikai Document Eizō (Chūhen)" (24thシングル 選抜じゃんけん大会ドキュメント映像（中編）)

=== Type B ===
CD
No.	Title	Music	Artist(s)	Length
1.	"Ue Kara Mariko" (上からマリコ)	Masahiro Kawaura		4:40
2.	"Noël no Yoru" (ノエルの夜)
3.	"Yobisute Fantasy" (呼び捨てファンタジー)		Team B
4.	"Ue Kara Mariko (Off Vocal Ver.)" (上からマリコ off vocal ver.)	Masahiro Kawaura		4:40
5.	"Noël no Yoru (Off Vocal Ver.)" (ノエルの夜 off vocal ver.)
6.	"Yobisute Fantasy (Off Vocal Ver.)" (呼び捨てファンタジー off vocal ver.)

DVD
No.	Title	Length
1.	"Ue Kara Mariko music video" (上からマリコ Music Video)
2.	"Noël no Yoru music video" (ノエルの夜 Music Video)
3.	"Yobisute Fantasy music video" (呼び捨てファンタジー Music Video)
4.	"24 Single Senbatsu Janken Taikai Document Eizō (Kōhen)" (4.24thシングル 選抜じゃんけん大会ドキュメント映像（後編）)
5.	"Shinoda Mariko Gachi Interview, Interviewer: Putchokun" (篠田麻里子ガチインタビュー インタビュアーぷっちょくん)

=== Theater Edition ===
CD
No.	Title	Music	Artist(s)	Length
1.	"Ue Kara Mariko" (上からマリコ)	Masahiro Kawaura		4:40
2.	"Noël no Yoru" (ノエルの夜)
3.	"Hashire! Penguin" (走れ!ペンギン)		Team 4
4.	"Ue Kara Mariko (Off Vocal Ver.)" (上からマリコ off vocal ver.)	Masahiro Kawaura		4:40
5.	"Noël no Yoru (Off Vocal Ver.)" (ノエルの夜 off vocal ver.)
6.	"Hashire! Penguin (Off Vocal Ver.)" (走れ!ペンギン off vocal ver.)

== Members ==
=== "Ue Kara Mariko" ===
Center: Mariko Shinoda

- Team A: **Shizuka Ōya**, Haruna Kojima, **Mariko Shinoda (#1)**, **Ami Maeda**
- Team K: **Sayaka Akimoto**, Ayaka Umeda, **Reina Fujie (#2)**, **Minami Minegishi (#3)**
- Team B: Tomomi Kasai, Rie Kitahara, **Sumire Satō**
- Team 4: Suzuran Yamauchi
- Kenkyūsei: **Marina Kobayashi (#4)**
- SKE48 Team S: Mizuki Kuwabara
- NMB48 Team N: Yūki Yamaguchi
- NMB48 Kenkyūsei: Ayame Hikawa

Top 8 members are in bold.

=== "Noël no Yoru" ===
- Team A: Aika Ōta, Haruna Kojima, Rino Sashihara, Mariko Shinoda, Aki Takajō, Minami Takahashi, Atsuko Maeda
- Team K: Tomomi Itano, Yūko Ōshima, Minami Minegishi, Sae Miyazawa, Yui Yokoyama
- Team B: Tomomi Kasai, Yuki Kashiwagi, Rie Kitahara, Sumire Satō, Mayu Watanabe
- SKE48 Team S: Jurina Matsui, Rena Matsui
- NMB48 Team N: Sayaka Yamamoto

=== "Rinjin wa Kizutsukanai" ===
sung by Team A

- Team A: Misaki Iwasa, Aika Ōta, Shizuka Ōya, Haruka Katayama, Asuka Kuramochi, Haruna Kojima, Rino Sashihara, Shinoda Mariko, Aki Takajō, Minami Takahashi, Haruka Nakagawa, Chisato Nakata, Sayaka Nakaya, Aika Ōta, Ami Maeda, Natsumi Matsubara

=== "Zero-sum Taiyō" ===
sung by Team K

- Team K: Sayaka Akimoto, Tomomi Itano, Mayumi Uchida, Ayaka Umeda, Yūko Ōshima, Ayaka Kikuchi, Miku Tanabe, Tomomi Nakatsuka, Moeno Nitō, Misato Nonaka, Reina Fujie, Sakiko Matsui, Minami Minegishi, Sae Miyazawa, Yui Yokoyama, Rumi Yonezawa

=== "Yobisute Fantasy" ===
sung by Team B

- Team B: Haruka Ishida, Tomomi Kasai, Yuki Kashiwagi, Rie Kitahara, Kana Kobayashi, Mika Komori, Amina Satō, Sumire Satō, Natsuki Satō, Shihori Suzuki, Mariya Suzuki, Rina Chikano, Natsumi Hirajima, Yuka Masuda, Miho Miyazaki, Mayu Watanabe

=== "Hashire! Penguin" ===
sung by Team 4 (Note: Mina Ōba is absent.)

- Team 4: Maria Abe, Miori Ichikawa, Anna Iriyama, Haruka Shimazaki, Haruka Shimada, Miyu Takeuchi, Mariya Nagao, Shiori Nakamata, Mariko Nakamura, Suzuran Yamauchi

== Oricon Charts ==
Release	Oricon Singles Chart	Peak position	Debut sales (copies)	Sales total (copies)
December 7, 2011	Daily Chart	1	959,280	1,304,312
December 7, 2011	Weekly Chart	1	1,198,864	1,304,312
December 7, 2011	Monthly Chart	1	1,273,748	1,304,312
