= Yuna Ego =

Yuna Ego 江籠 裕奈
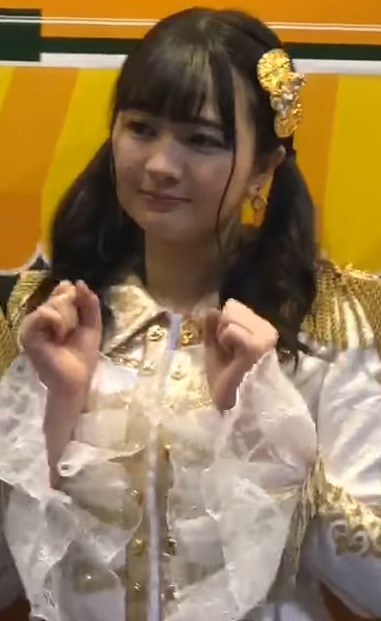

Background information
- Also known as: Egochan
- Born: 29 March 2000 (age 26); Nagoya, Aichi Prefecture, Japan
- Genres: J-pop
- Occupation: singer
- Instrument: Vocals
- Years active: 2011 – present
- Formerly of: SKE48 (2011 – 2023)
- Website: https://egoyuna.com/

Yuna Ego (江籠 裕奈, Ego Yūna; born 29 March 2000 in Nagoya, Aichi Prefecture) is a Japanese singer. She is a former member of the Japanese idol girl group SKE48 and its team, Team KII.

She is affiliated with Zest, Inc.

== Biography ==
Miyamae passed SKE48's 5th generation auditions in October 2011. Her debut was on 26 November 2011. On 13 April 2013, she was promoted to Team S during SKE48's shuffle. She started activities as a Team S member in July 2013.

In February 2014, during the AKB48 Group Shuffle, it was announced she would be transferred to Team KII.

Her future dream is to be a model.

She made her solo debut on 20 July 2022, with "Kimi ga Daisuki, Mitai Nandesu".

On 18 July 2023, Ego announced her graduation from SKE48. Her graduation was on 31 December of the same year.

On 1 January 2024, Ego announced that she will continue her musical activity as a solo singer. Her next solo single will be released on Spring 2024. Additionally, she was to hold her birthday concert on 29 March of that year.

== Discography ==
=== SKE48 singles ===
| Year | No. | Title | Role | Notes |
|---|---|---|---|---|
| 2012 | 8 | "Kataomoi Finally" | B-side | Sang on "Kyou Made no Koto, Korekara no Koto" |
| 2012 | 9 | "Aishite-love-ru!" | B-side | Sang on "Me ga Itai Kurai Hareta Sora" |
| 2012 | 10 | "Kiss datte Hidarikiki" | B-side | Sang on "Taiikukan de Choushoku wo" |
| 2013 | 11 | "Choco no Dorei" | B-side | Sang on "Fuyu no Kamome" |
| 2013 | 12 | "Utsukushii Inazuma" | B-side | Sang on "JYURI-JYURI BABY" as Team S |
| 2013 | 13 | "Sansei Kawaii!" | B-side | Sang on "Itsunomanika, Yowaimonoijime" |
| 2014 | 14 | "Mirai to wa?" | B-side | Sang on "Neko no Shippo ga Pin to Tatteru you ni" as Team S |
| 2014 | 15 | "Bukiyō Taiyō" | B-side | Sang on "Sayonara Kinou no Jibun" as Team KII |
| 2014 | 16 | "12 Gatsu no Kangaroo" | B-side | Sang on "DA DA Machine Gun" as Team KII |
| 2015 | 17 | "Coquettish Jūtai Chū" | A-side | Also sang on "Boku wa Shitteiru"; "Konya wa Join Us!" as Team KII |
| 2015 | 18 | "Mae Nomeri" | A-side | Also sang on "Shozo ga kono Boku wo Damenisuru" as Team KII; "Seihuku wo Kita Meitantei" as Dreaming Girls |
| 2016 | 19 | "Chicken LINE" | A-side | Also sang on "Kiss Position" as Team KII; "Bouenkyou no Nai Tenmondai" as Passion For You Senbatsu |
| 2016 | 20 | "Kin no Ai, Gin no Ai" | A-side | Also sang on "Happy Rankings."; "konya wa Sheke It!" as Love Crescendo |

=== AKB48 singles ===
| Year | No. | Title | Role | Notes |
|---|---|---|---|---|
| 2012 | 27 | "Gingham Check" | B-side | Sang on "Ano Hi no Fuurin" |
| 2014 | 38 | "Kibouteki Refrain" | B-side | Sang on "Ima, Happy" |
| 2015 | 39 | "Green Flash" | B-side | Sang on "Sekai ga Naiteru Nara" |

=== Solo Singles ===
| Title | Release date | Chart positions | | | Sales (Oricon) | | Album |
| Title | Release date | Oricon Weekly Singles Chart | Billboard Japan Hot 100 | RIAJ Digital Track Chart^{*} | First week | Total | Album |
|---|---|---|---|---|---|---|---|
| "Kimi ga Daisuki, Mitai Nandesu" (君が大好き、みたいなんです, Kimi ga Daisuki, Mitai Nandesu; "It's Like I Love You") | July 20, 2022 | | | | | | Non-album singles |
| TBA | 2024 | | | | | | Non-album singles |

== Appearances ==
=== Stage units ===
SKE48 Kenkyuusei Stage "PARTY ga Hajimaru yo" (PARTYが始まるよ)

1. ""Hoshi no Ondo" (星の温度)"

SKE48 Kenkyuusei Stage "Aitakatta" (会いたかった)

1. ""Glass no I LOVE YOU" (ガラスの I LOVE YOU)"
2. ""Senaka Kara Dakishimete" (背中から抱きしめて)"
3. ""Rio no Kakumei" (リオの革命)"

SKE48 Team S 4th Stage "RESET"

1. "Ashita no Tame ni Kiss wo" (明日のためにキスを)

SKE48 Team KII 3rd Stage "Ramune no Nomikata" (ラムネの飲み方) (Revival)

1. "Usotsuki na Dachou" (嘘つきなダチョウ)
