= Thumbnail (album) =

Studio album by AKB48
- Released: January 25, 2017
- Recorded: 2015–2016
- Genre: J-pop
- Label: You, Be Cool! / King
- Producer: Yasushi Akimoto

AKB48 chronology
0 to 1 no Aida (2015)	Thumbnail (2017)	Bokutachi wa, Ano Hi no Yoake wo Shitteiru (2018)

Thumbnail (サムネイル) is the fifth studio album by Japanese idol girl group AKB48, released on 25 January 2017. This album features the singles "Kuchibiru ni Be My Baby", "High Tension", as well as "365 Nichi no Kamihikouki", the main theme from NHK's Asadora series, Asa ga Kita. This is the last album to feature long-time member and former AKB48 Team A Haruna Kojima.

== Track listing ==
Thumbnail – Type A
No.	Title	Music	Performers	Length
1.	"Kuchibiru ni Be My Baby"	Yoshifumi Kōchi		4:40
2.	"365 Nichi no Kamihikouki"	Toshikazu Kadono, Hiroki Aoba		4:40
3.	"Kimi wa Melody"	you-me	AKB48 ft. Graduated Members	4:42
4.	"Tsubasa wa Iranai"	Makoto Wakatabe		4:35
5.	"Love Trip"	Haruyuki	8th Sousenkyo Senbatsu Members	5:50
6.	"Shiawase wo Wakenasai"	Michihiko Yanai	8th Sousenkyo Senbatsu Members	4:50
7.	"Hikari to Kage no Hibi"	Shūtarō Katagiri		4:28
8.	"High Tension"	Satori Shiraishi		3:48
9.	"Ano Hi no Jibun"			4:09
10.	"Get you!"	Yūsuke Itagaki	Sashining Musume	3:45
11.	"Tanjobi TANGO"			4:20
12.	"Coin Toss"		Nana Okada	3:41
13.	"Hibiwareta Kagami"			4:31
14.	"Ayamachi"		Sayaka Yamamoto featuring Junichi Inagaki	4:51

Type B
No.	Title	Length
1.	"Kuchibiru ni Be My Baby"	4:40
2.	"365 Nichi no Kamihikouki"	4:40
3.	"Kimi wa Melody"	4:42
4.	"Tsubasa wa Iranai"	4:35
5.	"Love Trip"	5:50
6.	"Shiawase wo Wakenasai"	4:50
7.	"Hikari to Kage no Hibi"	4:28
8.	"High Tension"	3:48
9.	"Ano Hi no Jibun"	4:09
10.	"Aokusai Rock"	3:54
11.	"Runner's High"	3:50
12.	"Dakara Kimi ga Sukina no ka?"	4:20
13.	"Baguette"	4:24

== Personnel ==
Graduated Members

- Haruka Shimazaki
- Minami Takahashi (on tracks 1–3)
- Yuko Oshima (on "Kimi wa Melody")
- Atsuko Maeda (on "Kimi wa Melody")
- Tomomi Itano (on "Kimi wa Melody")
- Mariko Shinoda (on "Kimi wa Melody")

Guests

- Morning Musume '17 (on "Get You!")
- Junichi Inagaki (on "Ayamachi")

== Release history ==
Region	Date	Format	Label
Japan	January 25, 2017	CD; digital download; streaming	King Records (YOU BE COOL division)
Hong Kong, Taiwan	January 25, 2017	CD; digital download; streaming	King Records
South Korea	July 13, 2018	digital download; streaming	Stone Music Entertainment; Genie Music; King
