= Ryoha Kitagawa =

Japanese idol (born 1998)

Ryoha Kitagawa 北川 綾巴
- Also known as: Uha
- Born: 9 October 1998 (age 27)
- Origin: Aichi Prefecture, Japan
- Genres: J-pop
- Occupations: Idol; singer; model; music producer
- Years active: 2013 – present
- Label: AKS

Ryoha Kitagawa (北川 綾巴, Kitagawa Ryōha; born 9 October 1998, in Aichi Prefecture) is a Japanese singer and model. She is a former member of the idol groups SKE48 and AKB48, where she was a member of Team S and Team 4, respectively. She is the producer of the Nagoya-based idol group Onegai! Full House, which debuted in September 2021.

== Career ==
Kitagawa passed SKE48's 6th generation auditions on January 1, 2013. Her debut was on February 28, 2013. Her debut stage performance was on April 20, 2013, at SKE48's Kenkyuusei Stage. In July 2013, together with Mako Kojima, Nana Okada, Miki Nishino, Nagisa Shibuya, Meru Tashima and Mio Tomonaga, they formed the sub-unit Tentoumu Chu!. Kitagawa's first SKE48 Senbatsu was for the single Sansei Kawaii!.

In February 2014, during the AKB48 Group Shuffle, it was announced that Kitagawa would be promoted to SKE48's Team S. On November 2, 2014, during SKE48's Request Hour Setlist Best 242 2014, SKE48's 16th single 12 Gatsu no Kangaroo was performed and Kitagawa and Ami Miyamae were the centers. This is the first time Jurina Matsui is not the center.

Kitagawa held a concurrent position in AKB48's Team 4 from March 26, 2015. On May 18, 2018, it was terminated.

Kitagawa's lightstick colours are pink, purple and pink.

=== Post-SKE48 ===
On November 2, 2021, Kitagawa released her first photobook, titled Kimi no Taiyou (君の太陽; lit. 'Your Sun') and photographed in Shinojima, Aichi Prefecture.

== Discography ==
=== SKE48 singles ===
Year	No.	Title	Role	Notes
2013	12	"Utsukushii Inazuma"	B-side	Sang on "Yuudachi no Mae"
2013	13	"Sansei Kawaii!"	A-side	Also sang on "Michi wa Naze Tsuzuku no ka" as Aichi Toyota Senbatsu
2014	14	"Mirai to wa?"	A-side	Also sang on "GALAXY of DREAMS" as the same-name-subgroup
2014	15	"Bukiyō Taiyō"	A-side	Also sang on "Tomodachi no Mama de" and "Houkago Race"
2014	16	"12 Gatsu no Kangaroo"	A-side	Also sang on "I love AICHI" as Aichi Toyota Senbatsu; "Kesenai Honō" as Team S.
2015	17	"Coquettish Jūtai Chū"	A-side	Also sang on "DIRTY" as Team S and "Boku wa Shitteiru"
2015	18	"Maenomeri"	A-side	Also sang on "Sutekina Zaiakukan" as Team S.
2016	19	"Chicken LINE"	A-side	Also sang on "Kanojo ga Iru" and "Tabi no Tochuu"
2016	20	"Kin no Ai, Gin no Ai"	A-side	Also sang on "Happy Ranking"

=== AKB48 singles ===
Year	No.	Title	Role	Notes
2013	32	"Koi Suru Fortune Cookie"	B-side	Sang "Aozora Cafe"
2013	33	"Heart Electric"	B-side	Sang "Kimi Dake ni Chu! Chu! Chu!" as Tentoumu Chu!
2013	34	"Suzukake no Ki no Michi de "Kimi no Hohoemi o Yume ni Miru" to Itte Shimattara Bokutachi no Kankei wa Dō Kawatte Shimau no ka, Bokunari ni Nan-nichi ka Kangaeta Ue de no Yaya Kihazukashii Ketsuron no Yō na Mono"	B-side	Sang on "Erande Rainbow" and "Escape"
2014	35	"Mae Shika Mukanee"	B-side	Sang on "Kinou Yori Motto Suki"
2014	36	"Labrador Retriever"	A-side	First AKB48 A-side.
2014	38	"Kibouteki Refrain"	B-side	Sang on "Ima, Happy"
2015	39	"Green Flash"	B-side	Sang on "Sekai ga Naiteru Nara" and "Hatsukoi no Oshibe"
2016	43	"Kimi wa Melody"	B-side	Sang on "Gonna Jump"

== Appearances ==
=== Stage units ===
SKE48 Kenkyuusei Stage "Aitakatta" (会いたかった)

1. ""Nageki no Figure" (嘆きのフィギュア)"
2. ""Koi no PLAN" (恋のPLAN)"
3. ""Senaka Kara Dakishimete" (背中から抱きしめて)"
4. ""Rio no Kakumei" (リオの革命)"

SKE48 Kenkyuusei Stage "Seifuku no Me" ((制服の芽)

1. "Ookami to Pride" (狼とプライド)

SKE48 Team S 3rd Stage "Seifuku no Me" ((制服の芽) (Revival)

1. "Omoide Ijou" (思い出以上)

=== TV variety ===
- AKBingo!
- Tentoumu Chu! no Sekai o Muchuu ni Sasemasu Sengen (てんとうむChu!の世界をムチューにさせます宣言!) (2014)

=== TV dramas ===
- Joshikou Keisatsu (女子高警察) (2014)
