= Sumire Satō =

Japanese singer and actress

- 佐藤 すみれ
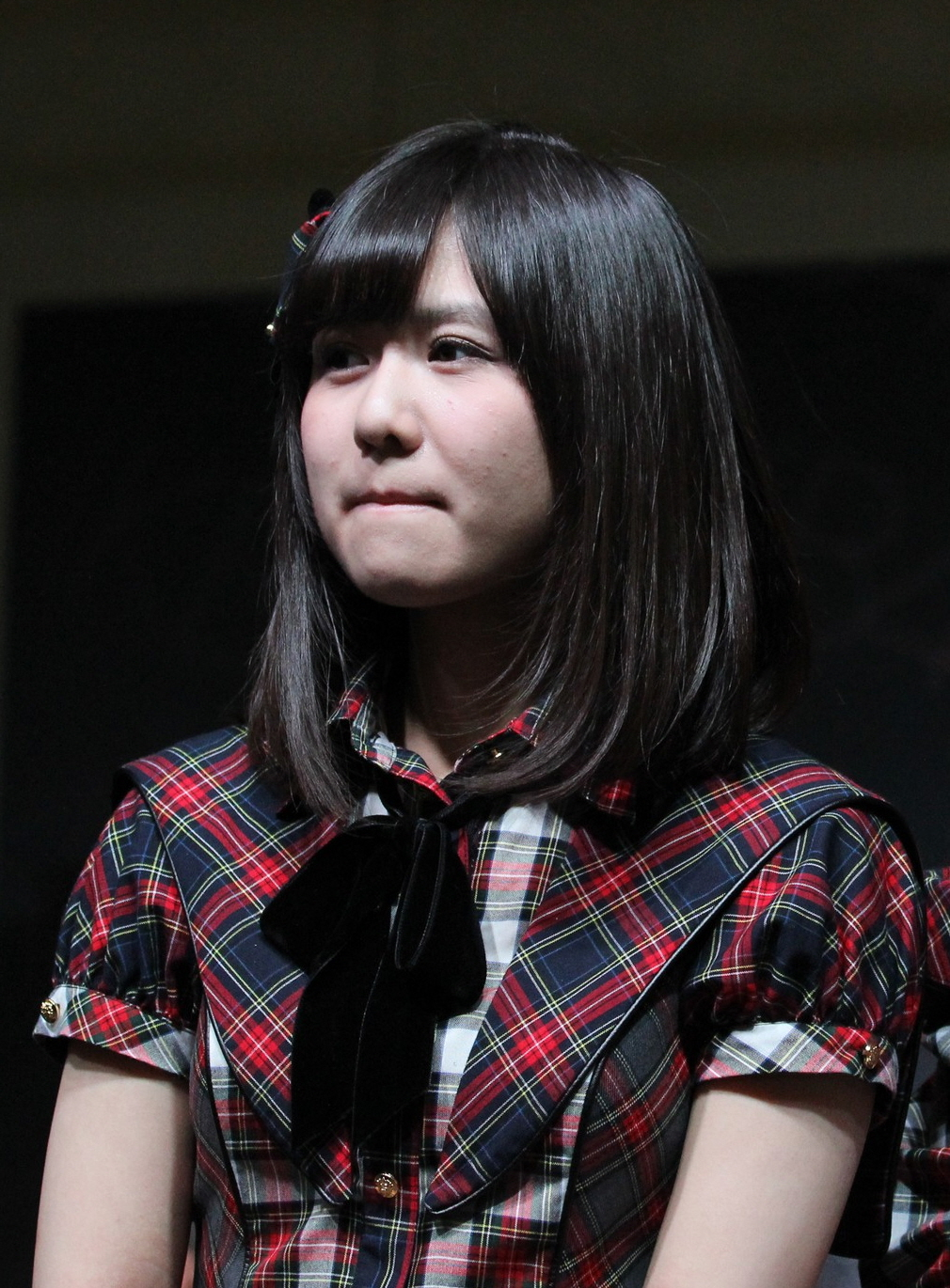
- Sumire Satō
- Born: November 20, 1993 (age 32); Saitama Prefecture, Japan
- Years active: 2008–2018
- Spouse: Ryo Aitaka (m. 2021)
- Children: 2
- Musical career
- Genres: J-pop
- Occupations: Singer; actress
- Instruments: Vocals; Drums
- Labels: King (AKB48); Avex Group (SKE48)
- Formerly of: AKB48, SKE48

Sumire Satō (佐藤 すみれ, Satō Sumire) is a Japanese singer and actress. She began her career as a member of the girl group AKB48 and later transferred to its sister group SKE48. In 2016, she starred in a live-action film based on Sanami Suzuki's manga adaptation of The Little Match Girl.

== Career ==
Satō was a finalist in Morning Musume's Happy 8 Ki Audition.

She joined AKB48 on December 20, 2008 as a seventh-generation member of its Kenkyusei (trainees). Her first participation in an AKB48 single was on the B-side track of "River" called "Kimi no Koto ga Suki Dakara" where she performed in the grouping Under Girls.

She was promoted to full member in AKB48.

On August 20, 2009, she took part in the AKB48 election and nationwide tour. On December 7, 2009, she joined Horipro. Her first A-side single for the group was "Chance no Junban". On May 21, 2010, she was promoted to Team B during Team shuffle.

On August 24, 2012, she was shuffled to become a member of Team A.

On April 25, 2014, she was transferred to SKE48's Team E.

She graduated from SKE48 Team E on January 7, 2018. She retired from the entertainment industry afterward. On June of the same year, she became a freelance creator.

== Private life ==
On January 1, 2021, Sato married kickboxer Ryo Aitaka and announced her pregnancy. She gave birth to their first child, a daughter named Hinano on June 24. On September 6, 2023, Sato gave birth to their second child, a son named Ritsu.

== Discography ==
=== Singles ===
==== AKB48 A-Sides ====
- Chance no Junban
- Everyday, Kachuusha
- Ue kara Mariko

==== AKB48 B-Sides ====
- Kimi no Koto ga Suki Dakara (River)
- Nusumareta Kuchibiru (Ponytail to Chouchou)
- Namida no Seesaw Game (Heavy Rotation)
- Yasai Sisters (Heavy Rotation)
- Boku Dake no value (Beginner)
- Love Jump (Chance no Junban)
- Guuzen no Juujiro (Sakura no Ki ni Narō)
- Yankee Soul (Everyday, Kachuusha)
- Dakishimechaikenai (Flying Get)
- Seishun to Kizukanai Mama (Flying Get)
- Yasai Uranai (Flying Get)
- Kimi no Senaka (Kaze wa Fuiteiru)
- Noel no Yoru (Ue kara Mariko)
- Yobisute Fantasy (Ue kara Mariko)
- New Ship (Give Me Five!)
- Mitsu no Namida (Manatsu no Sounds Good!)
- Show Fight! (Gingham Check)
- Kodoku na Hoshizora (Uza)

=== AKB48 albums ===
- Jibun Rashisa (Kamikyokutachi)
- Wagamama Collection (Koko ni Ita Koto)

== Appearances ==
=== Concerts ===
- Coco Smile Family Concert Volume 2: Legend (8 January 2006)
- End of the Year Thanksgiving: We're going to shuffle AKB! Give your regards to SKE as well (20 December 2008)
- AKB48 Request Hour Set List Best 100 2009 (18 January 2009)
- AKB48 Bunshin no Jutsu Tour (15 August 2009)
- AKB48 Natsu no Saruobasan Matsuri (13 September 2009)
- AKB48 New York concert at Webster Hall (27 September 2009)
- J-Pop Culture Festival, Jakarta (February 2012)

=== Musicals ===
- Coco Smile 3: Nijiiro no Melody (18–22 August 2004)
- Coco Smile 4: Kinsei no Stage (24–28 August 2005)
- Happa no Freddie Inochi no Tabi (July 2006 - August 2006)
- Happa no Freddie Inochi no Tabi (July 2007 - August 2007)
- Coco Smile 4: Kinsei no Stage (14 August 2008 - 19 August 2008)
- Peter Pan - Wendy Darling (2012-2015)

=== Drama ===
- Majisuka Gakuen ( Short moment in the last ep)
- Majisuka Gakuen 2 (April 15 - July 1, 2011, as Sanshoku)

=== Anime ===
- AKB0048 (April 29, 2012 - July 22, 2012) as Mimori Kishida.
- AKB0048 Next Stage (January 4, 2013 - March 30, 2013) As Mimori Kishida/Shinoda Mariko The 8th.

=== Movies ===
- Ultraman Saga (24 March 2012, as Lisa)
- The Little Match Girl
