= Chicken Line =

- Theater edition cover

Single by SKE48
- B-side: "Kanojo ga Iru" (Type A); "Kiss Position" (Type B); "Is That Your Secret?" (Type C); "Tabi no Tochū" (Type D); "Bouenkyo no nai Tenmondai" (All Types)
- Released: March 30, 2016 (Japan)
- Genre: J-Pop
- Length: 4:53
- Label: Avex Trax
- Songwriter(s): Yasushi Akimoto

SKE48 singles chronology
"Mae Nomeri" (2015)	"Chicken Line" (2016)	"Golden Love, Silver Love" (2016)

Music video
- Chicken LINE (Short ver.) on YouTube

Chicken Line (stylized as "Chicken LINE"; チキンLINE) is the 19th single by Japanese idol girl group SKE48. It was released on March 30, 2016. The song debuted at number one on the Oricon Weekly Singles Chart, selling 257,095 copies in the first week. It also reached number one on the Billboard Japan Hot 100.

The title track is the main theme from the movie PriPara Mi~nna no Akogare ♪ Let's Go ☆ PriPari. This is the first single without the graduated member Rena Matsui, and the first after the release of Love Crescendo debut single, "Cup no Naka no Komorebi".

Unlike AKB48 and HKT48 (which release full versions of previous single, whenever a new one is released), SKE48 does not release full versions of their music videos on YouTube as of 2011, due to restrictions imposed by Avex Trax, which currently belongs. A short version of music video was published on March 7. The full version is included only on limited editions, and was not published on YouTube. As "Coquettish Jūtai Chū", the full version from MV wasn't leaked prior to its release.

This is the last appearance of Sae Miyazawa on a 48G single, as she attended for a last time on an AKB48 single prior to her graduation. Miyazawa was featured previously on Kimi wa Melody (released March 9), and "Tabi no Tochū" is her graduation song which is featured on Type D. Sae graduated from SKE48 in a concert held on Nippon Gaishi Hall on March 4, then from SNH48, on a special graduation stage on March 16, 2016.

Types A, B, C and D covers were changed, due to similarities with Body Language, by Australian singer Kylie Minogue.

== Lineup ==
=== Chicken LINE (Senbatsu) ===
- Team S: Azuma Rion, Oya Masana, Kitagawa Ryoha, Futamura Haruka, Matsui Jurina
- Team KII: Ego Yuna, Oba Mina, Souda Sarina, Takayanagi Akane, Furuhata Nao
- Team E: Kimoto Kanon, Kumazaki Haruka, Goto Rara, Shibata Aya, Sugawara Maya, Suda Akari, Tani Marika

The member marked in RED is the song center.

=== Kanojo ga Iru (Team S) ===
- Team S: Azuma Rion, Inuzuka Asana, Oya Masana, Kitagawa Ryoha, Goto Risako, Sugiyama Aika, Takeuchi Mai, Tsuzuki Rika, Noguchi Yume, Nojima Kano, Futamura Haruka, Matsui Jurina, Matsumoto Chikako, Miyazawa Sae, Miyamae Ami, Yakata Miki, Yamauchi Suzuran, Yamada Juna

=== Kiss Position (Team KII) ===
- Team KII: Aoki Shiori, Arai Yuki, Ishida Anna, Uchiyama Mikoto, Ego Yuna, Oba Mina, Obata Yuna, Kitano Ruka, Shirai Kotono, Souda Sarina, Takagi Yumana, Takatsuka Natsuki, Takayanagi Akane, Takeuchi Saki, Hidaka Yuzuki, Furuhata Nao, Matsumura Kaori, Yamashita Yukari

=== Is That Your Secret? (Team E) ===
- Team E: Ida Reona, Ichino Narumi, Kato Rumi, Kamata Natsuki, Kimoto Kanon, Kumazaki Haruka, Koishi Kumiko, Goto Rara, Saito Makiko, Sakai Mei, Sato Sumire, Shibata Aya, Sugawara Maya, Suda Akari, Takatera Sana, Tani Marika, Fukushi Nao

=== Bouenkyo no nai Tenmondai ===
Performed by Passion For You Senbatsu

=== Tabi no Tochū ===
Sae Miyazawa's graduation song

== Track list ==
Type A
No.	Title	Length
1.	"Chicken Line"
2.	"Kanojo ga Iru (Team S)"
3.	"Bouenkyo no nai Tenmondai (Passion For You)"
4.	"Chicken Line (off vocal)"
5.	"Kanojo ga Iru (off vocal)"
6.	"Bouenkyo no nai Tenmondai (off vocal)"

Type B
No.	Title	Length
1.	"Chicken Line"
2.	"Kiss Position (Team KII)"
3.	"Bouenkyo no nai Tenmondai (Passion For You)"
4.	"Chicken Line (off vocal)"
5.	"Kiss Position (off vocal)"
6.	"Bouenkyo no nai Tenmondai (off vocal)"

Type C
No.	Title	Length
1.	"Chicken Line"
2.	"Is that your secret? (Team E)"
3.	"Bouenkyo no nai Tenmondai (Passion For You)"
4.	"Chicken Line (off vocal)"
5.	"Is that your secret? (off vocal)"
6.	"Bouenkyo no nai Tenmondai (off vocal)"

Type D
No.	Title	Length
1.	"Chicken Line"
2.	"Tabi no Tochū (Sae Miyazawa's graduation song)"
3.	"Bouenkyo no nai Tenmondai (Passion For You)"
4.	"Chicken Line (off vocal)"
5.	"Tabi no Tochū (off vocal)"
6.	"Bouenkyo no nai Tenmondai (off vocal)"

Theater
No.	Title	Length
1.	"Chicken Line"
2.	"Bouenkyo no nai Tenmondai (Passion For You)"
3.	"SKE48 19th Single Medley"
4.	"Chicken Line (off vocal)"
5.	"Bouenkyo no nai Tenmondai (off vocal)"

NOTE: Theater version doesn't include a bonus DVD.

== Charts ==
Chart (2016)	Peak position
Japan (Oricon Daily Singles Chart)	1
Japan (Oricon Weekly Singles Chart)	1
Japan (Billboard Japan Hot 100)	1
