= Oh My Pumpkin! =

2025 single by AKB48

- Pre-release cover for digital distribution (Note: Five different cover designs were used for this single. The cover used on the release date was labeled as the “Special Edition.”)

Single by AKB48
- B-side: "Ishi no Taiboku"; "Aidoru da yo, Jinsei wa..."; "Sumaho, Miteru Baai Janai"
- Released: August 13, 2025
- Recorded: 2025
- Studio: Studio Recolte
- Genre: J-pop
- Length: 5:02
- Label: EMI; UMJ
- Lyricist: Yasushi Akimoto
- Producer: Shinsuke Akimoto

AKB48 singles chronology
"Masaka no Confession" (2025)	"Oh My Pumpkin!" (2025)	"Nagori Sakura" (2026)

Alternative cover
- Physical Regular Edition cover

Music videos
- "Oh My Pumpkin! on YouTube

"Oh My Pumpkin!" is the 66th single by Japanese idol girl group AKB48. It was released on August 13, 2025. Member Yui Oguri served as both lead singer and choreographic center.

"Oh My Pumpkin!" topped the Oricon chart, marking the group’s 53rd consecutive No. 1 ranking since "River" in 2009, making them the only Japanese artist to achieve the most No. 1 hits on this chart.

The lead song from this single has been covered in seven languages by the overseas sister groups, each in their respective language and released simultaneously. This single received Planning Award at the 67th Japan Record Awards.

== Background and release ==
This single was marketed to celebrate the group's 20th anniversary since their debut. On May 31, during their handshake event, which was also streamed worldwide on YouTube, it was announced that the group would release their 66th single on August 13. The single would feature 11 members from AKB48, along with one member from each overseas sister group, plus four graduated members: Minami Takahashi, Haruna Kojima, Rino Sashihara, and Atsuko Maeda. It was also announced that each overseas sister group would release their version of the lead song at the same time. This is the first time since 2016 that a graduated member has participated in a lead song with "Kimi wa Melody". It is also the first time overseas sister group members have participated in AKB48's discography since "Sentimental Train" in 2018.

On July 11, the single title, CD version, tracklist, and album covers were announced. This single was released in three different version with different tracklist and covers: Regular, Limited, and Official Shop edition. It was also revealed that the pre-release would be available digitally on July 19.

Prior the release day, it was reported that a shipping error affecting the Official Shop edition caused many customers to receive a different number of CDs than they had ordered. The management issued an apology and asked customers to return the extra items.

== Promotion and live performance ==
Prior to release date, several retailers held limited campaigns for fans. Tower Records and HMV released special posters under specific circumstances, Amazon Japan gave out solo trading cards, and 7net offered solo acrylic stands.

To commemorate the release of this single, handshake events were held at Intex Osaka on August 31 and at Makuhari Messe on October 13. The group also held a live tour, performing in Aichi from August 16 to 18, at Grand Cube Osaka on September 14, Hiroshima Bunka Gakuen HBG Hall on September 15, Tokyo Electron Hall in Miyagi on October 4, and Nippon Budokan in Tokyo from December 4 to 7.

The group also held an overseas performance and fan meeting in Jakarta on October 26. A concert in Shanghai was scheduled to take place from September 26 to 27 at the NECC, Shanghai but was later postponed to 2026. The group also held a concert at HKCEC, Hong Kong on October 7.

Besides the group's concert and regular theater performances, they also made appearances on various television programs, including TBS's annual program "Music Day" on July 19, TV Asahi's "Music Station" on August 22 2025, and Nippon TV's "Buzz Rhythm 02" on September 12, The group also performed at Tokyo Idol Festival on August 1, 2025. and Japan Record Awards on December 30.

== Cover versions ==
With the participation of members from overseas sister groups of different nationalities, language barriers occurred during the making of this single. Lead song from this single has been covered in various languages by each overseas sister groups: Bahasa Indonesia and Javanese by JKT48, Thai by BNK48, mix of Tagalog and English by MNL48, Mandarin by TSH48 and AKB48 Team TP, Lanna by CGM48, Malay by KLP48.

== Receptions and commercial performance ==
Besides commemorating the group’s 20th anniversary since their debut, the release of this single was generally viewed as aiming for a “second golden age of AKB48.”

This single debuted atop the Oricon Singles Chart, selling 283,813 copies on its release day and topping Oricon’s singles daily chart. The single also ranked first on Billboard Japan’s daily singles chart with 447,946 copies on its first day of release and topped the singles sales chart for the period from August 11 to 13.

On the weekly chart, this single topped Oricon’s Weekly Singles Chart with 351,337 copies sold, marking the group’s 53rd consecutive No. 1. The single also topped Billboard Japan’s Weekly Singles Chart with 526,580 copies sold. On the Japan Hot 100, the single ranked fourth in its release week.

This single received Double Platinum certification by RIAJ on August and rewarded Planning Award by Japan Record Awards on November.

Meanwhile, on the annual sales charts, this single ranked tenth on Billboard Japan and twentieth on Oricon.

== Music video ==
The music video showed the current members of AKB48 and their graduates along with their overseas sister groups members.

Unlike previous releases, the music video for the lead song was not released until the single’s release date. Member Oguri stated through her Tweet on Twitter that they were unable to release it. However, during the group’s tour at Nippon Budokan, the music video was unexpectedly shown to the audience and was later uploaded to the group’s YouTube channel.

The music video was directed by Noboru Mada, who previously worked with Nogizaka46's "Hodōkyō" photo jacket, ≠Me's "Gekkabijin" music video, Da-ice and many more.

The music video consists of two main scenes: one featuring the members dancing against a floral backdrop, and another set at the beach. Maeda, one of the graduated members, was unable to attend the dancing scene due to schedule conflict; as a result, the beach scene was added to include her appearance. Although CJ from MNL48 was part of the lineup, she does not appear in the music video due to her travel documentation issues.

== Artwork and packaging ==
This single was released in three physical versions, each featuring different artwork and track listings: the Regular Edition, Limited Edition, and Official Shop Edition. For digital distribution was also issued with different artwork and track listings. For the pre-release, only the lead track was made available released on July 19 prior the first television performance, while the Special Edition included all songs from the physical release except for the instrumental versions.

All versions of the single, except for the Limited Edition, include only a CD and a lyric booklet. The Limited Edition additionally includes a Blu-ray disc that contains some performance from the AKB48 20th Year Spring Concert 2025. The contents of the lyric booklet vary depending on the version. Each package also includes a randomly selected trading card and a postcard-sized member photo.

== Track listing ==
=== Regular and Official Shop edition ===
CD
No.	Title	Music	Arrangement	Length
1.	"Oh My Pumpkin!"	Kenta Urashima, ShinQ	ShinQ	5:02
2.	"Ishi no Taiboku" (意思の大木)	Yanagisawa Hideki	Yanagisawa Hideki	4:20
3.	"Sumaho, Miteru Baai Janai" (スマホ、見てる場合じゃない)	Nazca	Stella	4:25
4.	"Oh My Pumpkin!" (Instrumental)	Urashima, ShinQ	ShinQ	5:02
5.	"Ishi no Taiboku" (Instrumental)	Hideki	Hideki	4:20
6.	"Sumaho, Miteru Baai Janai" (Instrumental)	Nazca	Stella	4:25
Total length:				27:34

=== Limited edition ===
CD
No.	Title	Music	Arrangement	Length
1.	"Oh My Pumpkin!"	Kenta Urashima, ShinQ	ShinQ	5:02
2.	"Ishi no Taiboku" (意思の大木)	Yanagisawa Hideki	Yanagisawa Hideki	4:20
3.	"Aidoru da yo, Jinsei wa..." (アイドルだよ、人生は…)	Takarot, Shoma Yamamoto, Funk Uchino	Takarot, Shoma Yamamoto	3:56
4.	"Oh My Pumpkin!" (Instrumental)	Urashima, ShinQ	ShinQ	5:02
5.	"Ishi no Taiboku" (Instrumental)	Hideki	Hideki	4:20
6.	"Aidoru da yo, Jinsei wa..." (Instrumental)	Takarot, Yamamoto, Uchino	Takarot, Yamamoto	3:56
Total length:				26:36

Blu-ray
No.	Title	Length
1.	"Skipping Stone"
2.	"Harewataru" (晴れ渡る)
3.	"Taimu Mashin Fuyōron" (タイムマシン不要論)
4.	"Masaka no Confession" (まさかのConfession)
5.	"Sakura no Hanabiratachi 2025" (桜の花びらたち 2025)
6.	"Yuirii" (ゆいりー)
7.	"Shōjotachiyo" (少女たちよ)

=== Notes ===
- All tracks are written by Akimoto Yasushi except the instrumental.
- "Oh My Pumpkin!" is stylized as "Oh my pumpkin!".

== Participating members ==
Adapted from the album's liner notes.

=== "Oh My Pumpkin!" ===
Performed by selection All Stars performers, consisting of:

- AKB48: Yuna Akiyama, Sae Arai, Yui Oguri, Narumi Kuranō, Airi Satō, Erī Chiba, Mion Mukaichi, Azuki Yagi, Mizuki Yamauchi, Momoka Ito, Mei Hanada.
- JKT48: Shania Gracia
- BNK48: Patalee "Hoop" Prasertteerachai
- MNL48: Christine Joyce "CJ" Dela Cruz
- TSH48: Gui Chuchu
- AKB48 Team TP: Lin Yu-hsin
- CGM48: Pimlapas "Lookked" Suwannoi
- KLP48: Foo Yi Shyan
- Graduates: Atsuko Maeda, Minami Takahashi, Haruna Kojima, Rino Sashihara

For "AKB48 Member ver." the performers are Yuna Akiyama, Sae Arai, Maho Omori, Yui Oguri, Narumi Kuranō, Hiyuka Sakagawa, Miu Shitao, Airi Satō, Manaka Taguchi, Erī Chiba, Remi Tokunaga, Ayami Nagatomo, Yuki Hirata, Mayū Masai, Miyu Mizushima, Mion Mukaichi, Azuki Yagi, Mizuki Yamauchi, Yui Yamaguchi, Sora Yamazaki, Momoka Ito, and Mei Hanada.

=== "Ishi no Taiboku" ===
"Ishi no Taiboku" (意思の大木) lit. 'Big Tree of Will' performed by selection Under Girls performers, consisting of: Saho Iwatate, Ōta Yuki, Kasumi Kudo, Hiyuka Sakagawa, Yumemi Sako, Miu Shitao, Kurumi Suzuki, Ayane Takahashi, Manaka Taguchi, Remi Tokunaga, Ayami Nagatomo, Serika Nagano, Kohina Narita, Eriko Hashimoto, Haruna Hashimoto, Nozomi Hatakeyama, Seina Fukuoka, Moka Hotei, Mayū Masai, Orin Mutō, and Yui Yamaguchi.

=== "Sumaho, Miteru Baai Janai" ===
"Sumaho, Miteru Baai Janai" (スマホ、見てる場合じゃない) lit. 'This Is Not the Time to Be Looking at Your Smartphone' performed by Momoka Ito, Hinano Kubo, Erī Chiba, Yuki Hirata, and Azuki Yagi.

=== "Aidoru da yo, Jinsei wa..." ===
"Aidoru da yo, Jinsei wa..." (アイドルだよ、人生は…) lit. 'Idols, Life is...' performed by Maho Omori, Mizushima Miyu, and Sora Yamazaki.

== Charts ==
=== Weekly charts ===
Weekly chart performance for "Oh My Pumpkin!"
Chart (2025)	Peak position
Japan (Japan Hot 100)	4
Japan (Oricon)	1

=== Monthly charts ===
Monthly chart performance for "Oh My Pumpkin!"
Chart (2025)	Position
Japan (Oricon)	1

=== Year-end charts ===
Year-end chart performance for "Oh My Pumpkin!"
Chart (2025)	Position
Japan (Oricon)	20

== Certifications and sales ==
Certifications for "Oh My Pumpkin!"
Region	Certification	Certified units/sales
Japan (RIAJ)	2× Platinum	500,000^{^}
^{^} Shipments figures based on certification alone.

Sales for "Oh My Pumpkin!"
Country	Sales	Ref.
Japan (Oricon)	430,390 (Note: This figure is based on the Oricon monthly single rankings from August to October. The figure is not updated because sales numbers are only available for the Top 50 rankings.)	
Japan (Billboard/SoundScan)	646,524 (Note: Billboard Japan sales figures are from the top 50 only. Exact sales figures are not available as Billboard Japan does not count sales below the top 50. Figure is not updated as of January 2026 (out of charts).)	

== Release history ==
List of release dates showing region, date, formats, editions and label
Region	Date	Format(s)	Edition(s)	Catalog Number	Label	Ref.
Various	July 19, 2025	Streaming	Pre-release	—N/a	Universal Music Japan	
Various	August 13, 2025	Streaming	Special	—N/a	Universal Music Japan	
Japan	August 13, 2025	CD	Standard	UPCH-80629	Universal Music Japan	
Japan	August 13, 2025	CD	Official Shop	PRON-5120	Universal Music Japan	
Japan	August 13, 2025	CD; Blu-ray	Limited	UPCH-89617	Universal Music Japan	
South Korea	August 13, 2025	CD; Blu-ray	Limited	—N/a	DH; Universal Music	
South Korea	August 13, 2025	CD	Standard	—N/a	DH; Universal Music	
Indonesia	October 26, 2025	CD	Standard	—N/a	Universal Music	
