= Rina Izuta =

Japanese singer

- 伊豆田 莉奈
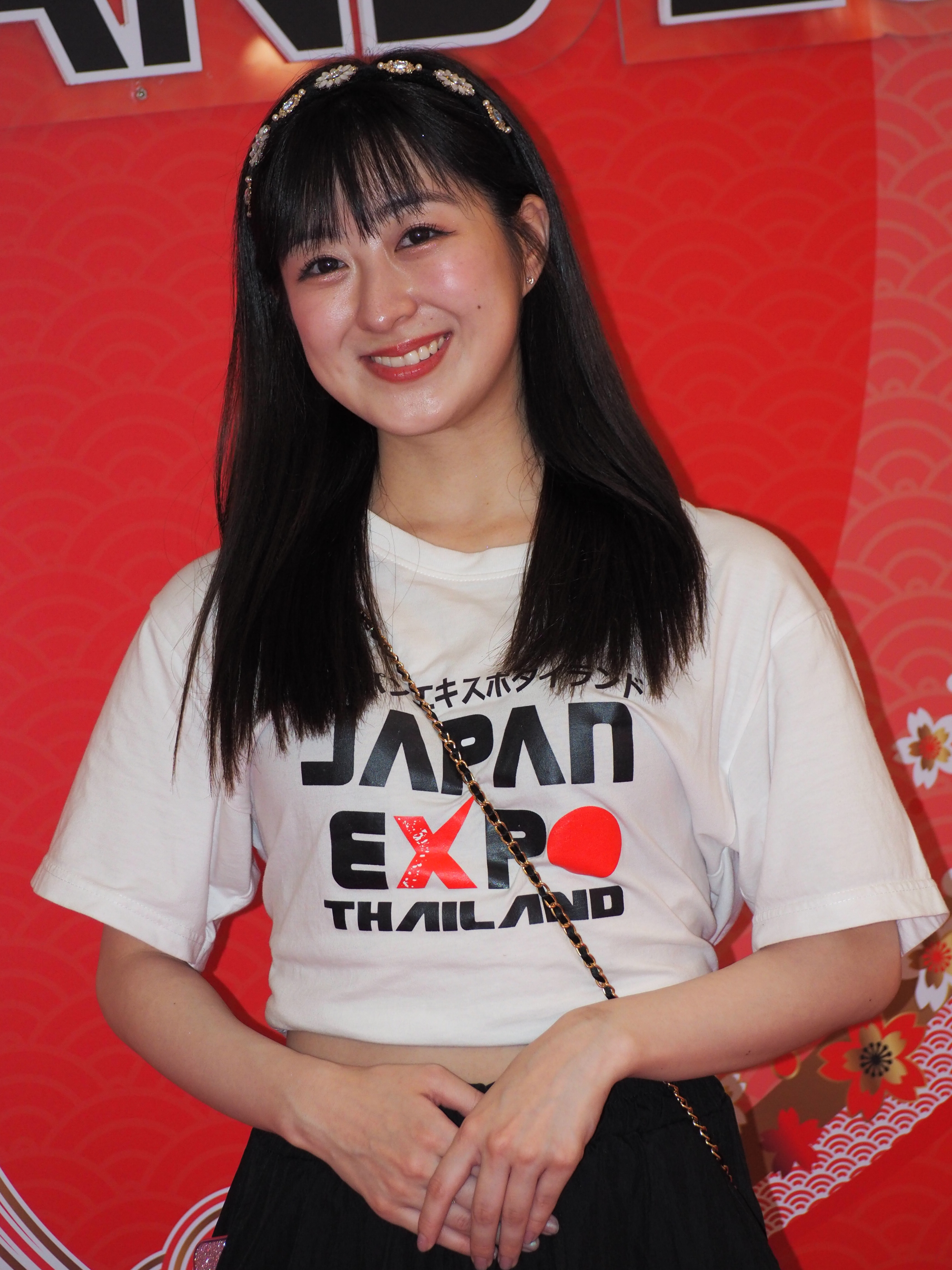
- Izuta in 2025
- Born: 26 November 1995 (age 30); Saitama Prefecture, Japan
- Other name: Izurina (いずりな)
- Occupation: Singer
- Years active: 2010–present
- Musical career
- Genres: J-pop, Thai pop
- Instrument: Vocals
- Labels: iAM; Superball; IC45 Entertainment

Japanese name
- Kanji: 伊豆田 莉奈
- Hiragana: いずた りな
- Katakana: イズタ リナ
Transcriptions
- Romanization: Izuta Rina

Rina Izuta (伊豆田 莉奈, Izuta Rina; born 26 November 1995) is a Japanese singer. She is a former member of AKB48, BNK48, and CGM48. She is also a former general manager of CGM48.

== Career ==
Izuta was born in Saitama Prefecture, and joined AKB48's 10th generation lineup in March 2010. On June 19, 2010, she was drafted into the Kenkyusei (research members) position within the group. On June 24, 2012, she is promoted to being a members of Team Unknown and later moved to Team A in August 2012.

After staying as Team A member, on 2014 at AKB48's Group Grand Reformation Festival she was moved to the group Team B. In 2015 she is moved to Team 4.

In July 2017 she was fully transferred to newly formed AKB48 overseas sister group BNK48. In the same year she got her first senbatsu position for the Thai version of "Koi Suru Fortune Cookie" and was also promoted to the formation of BNK48's Team BIII.

In January 2019 Izuta ranked #21 at her group single election. This also marked her first position at election during her AKB48 Group career. In July she announced that she would become CGM48's general manager. This also marked her position from BNK48 members to become CGM48 members. In 2020 she was part of CGM48 debut single senbatsu performer and filled the formation of CGM48's Team C.

In summary, she is experienced as part of three different groups: AKB48, BNK48, and CGM48. She is also a part of AKB48's Team Unknown, Team A, Team B, and Team 4; BNK48's Team BIII; and CGM48's Team C.

== AKB48 group general election placements ==
Izuta's first election was in the third edition of the AKB48 general election in 2011, while her first election in BNK48 was in 2019. Here are her placements:

BNK48 Senbatsu general election

Edition	Year	Final rank	Number of votes	Position on single	Single	Song	Ref
1	2019	21	9,305	Under Girls	Beginner	Kimi no Koto ga Suki Dakara	
2	2020	30	3,885	Under Girls	Heavy Rotation	Hashire! Penguin	
3	2022	27	7,392.29	Under Girls	Believers	Make Noise	
4	2024	38	7,122.2	Next Girls	Kiss Me!	Kurumi to Dialogue	

AKB48 general election

Edition	Year	Final rank	Number of votes	Position on single	Single
3	2011	Not ranked			-
4	2012	Not ranked			-
5	2013	Not ranked			-
6	2014	Not ranked			-
7	2015	Not ranked			-
8	2016	Not ranked			-
9	2017	Not ranked			-
10	2018	Not ranked			-

== Discography ==
=== Singles ===
AKB48

Release year	Single	Song	Part of
2010	"Chance no Junban"	"Fruits Snow"	Team Kenkyūsei
2011	"Sakura no Ki ni Narō"	"Ōgon Center"	Team Kenkyūsei
2011	"Everyday, Katyusha"	"Anti"	Team Kenkyūsei
2011	"Kaze wa Fuiteiru"	"Tsubomitachi"	Team 4 + Kenkyūsei
2012	"Give Me Five!"	"Jung ya Freud no Baai"	Special Girls C
2012	"Manatsu no Sounds Good!"	"Mitsu no Namida"	Special Girls
2012	"Gingham Check"	"Ano Hi no Fuurin"	Waiting Girls
2012	"Uza"	"Kodoku na Hoshizora"	New Team A
2012	"Eien Pressure"	"Watashitachi no Reason"	
2013	"So Long!"	"Ruby"	Team A
2013	"Sayonara Crawl"	"Ikiru koto"	Team A
2013	"Heart Electric"	"Kiss made Countdown"	Team A
2014	"Mae shika Mukanee"	"Koi toka..."	
2014	"Labrador Retriever"	"B Garden"	Team B
2014	"Kibōteki Refrain"	"Loneliness Club"	Team B
2014	"Kibōteki Refrain"	"Reborn"	Team Surprise (Center)
2015	"Kuchibiru ni Be My Baby"	"Nanka, Chotto, Kyuu ni..."	Team 4
2016	"Tsubasa wa Iranai"	"Kangaeru Hito"	Team 4

BNK48

Release year	Single	Song	Notes
2017	"Koisuru Fortune Cookie - คุกกี้เสี่ยงทาย (Khukki Siangthai)"	"Koi Suru Fortune Cookie (Khukki Siangthai)"	First A-side single
2017	"Koisuru Fortune Cookie - คุกกี้เสี่ยงทาย (Khukki Siangthai)"	"BNK48 (Bangkok48)"	
2018	"Shonichi - วันแรก (Wan Raek)"	"Namida Surprise! - ประกายน้ำตาและรอยยิ้ม! (Prakai Namta Lae Roiyim)"	
2018	"Kimi wa Melody - เธอคือ...เมโลดี้ (Thoe Khue Melodi)"	"Yume e no Route - หมื่นเส้นทาง (Muen Sen Thang)"	
2019	"Beginner"	"Kimi no Koto ga Suki Dakara - ก็เพราะว่าชอบเธอ (Ko Phro Wa Chop Thoe)"	Undergirls
2020	"Heavy Rotation"	"Hashire! Penguin - วิ่งไปสิ.. เพนกวิน (Wing Pai Si.. Penguin)"	Undergirls

CGM48

Release year	Single	Song	Notes
2020	Chiang Mai 106	"Chiang Mai 106"	
2020	Chiang Mai 106	"Onegai Valentine - วาเลนไทน์...โชคดี (Valentine Chok Dee)"	
2020	Chiang Mai 106	"CGM48 (Chiang Mai 48)"	WCenter with Punyawee Jungcharoen.
2020	Melon Juice	"Melon Juice"	
2020	Melon Juice	"Dareka no Tame ni - เพื่อใครสักคน (Phuea Khai Sak Khon)"	The song is dedicated to all health workers during the COVID-19 and fire fighter during the forest fires in Chiang Mai.
2021	Mali	"Mali" - มะลิ (Jasmine)"	
2021	Mali	"Chain of love"	
2021	Mali	"Anata ga ite kureta kara - บ้านแห่งหัวใจ (Baan Haeng Hua Jai)"	

Other

Release year	Title	Notes
2020	"Touch by Heart"	Released in order to support people suffering from COVID-19.
2020	"Touch by Heart (Lanna version)"	Released in order to support people suffering from COVID-19.
2020	"Touch by Heart (Japanese version)"	Released in order to support people suffering from COVID-19.
2020	"Touch by Heart (Special version)"	Released in order to support people suffering from COVID-19.
2021	"Let's go all the way" (ไปต่อ)	The title song for the movie Hao Peng Jah Yah Gang Nong.

=== Albums ===
AKB48

Release year	Album	Song
2011	Koko ni Ita Koto	"High school days"
2011	Koko ni Ita Koto	"Koko ni Ita Koto (AKB48 + SKE48 + SDN48 + NMB48)"
2012	1830m	"Miniskirt no Yosei"
2012	1830m	"Aozora yo Sabishikunai Ka? (AKB48 + SKE48 + NMB48 + HKT48)"
2014	Tsugi no Ashiato	"Kakushin ga Moterumono"
2015	Koko ga Rhodes da, Koko de Tobe!	"To go de"
2015	0 to 1 no Aida	"Nakigoto Time"

BNK48

Release year	Album	Song	Notes
2019	Jabaja	"Reborn"	Center performer.

== Filmography ==
=== Movie ===
Year	Title	Role	Notes	Ref.
2018	BNK48: GIRLS DON'T CRY	herself	BNK48 documentary	
2020	BNK48: One Take	herself	BNK48 documentary	
2021	God Bless The Trainees Too!	herself		

=== Television ===
Year	Title	Role	Network
2010–2017	AKBINGO!	Rotational	Nippon TV
2012	AKB48 Nemousu Terebi (Season 9)	Herself	Tohokushinsha
2017	BNK48 Show	Herself	3SD
2018	Victory BNK48	Herself	Workpoint
