= AKB48 China =

AKB48 China may refer to:

- AKB48 Team SH, official sister group of AKB48 in mainland China, replacing SNH48
- AKB48 Team TP, official sister group of AKB48 in Taiwan, replacing TPE48
