= KLP48 =

Malaysian idol girl group

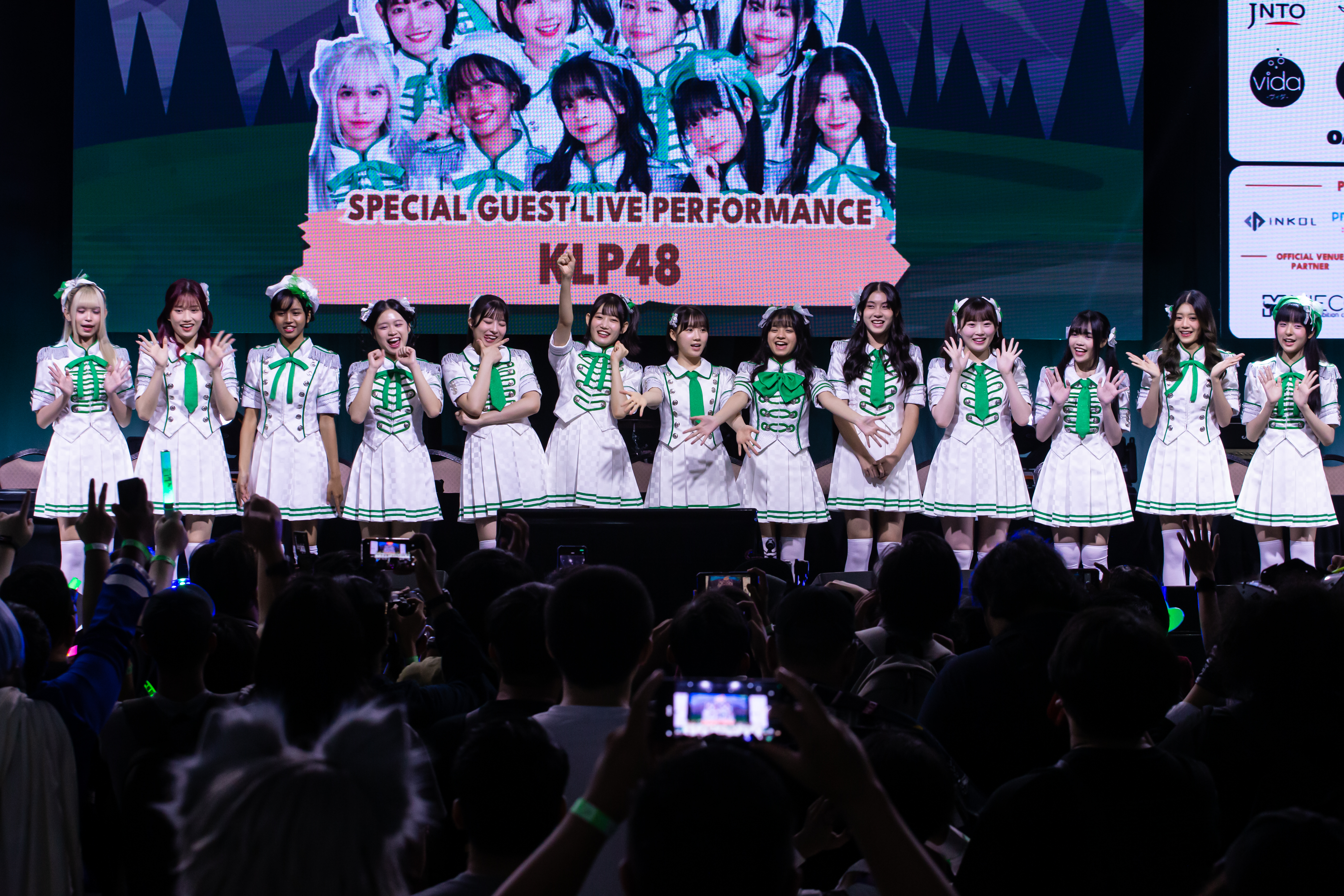
- KLP48 in August 2024; L–R: Lucine, Yi Shyan, Amanda, Ann Drea, Yurina, Haruka, Cocoa, Salwa, Khalies, Suzuha, Tiffany, Devi, and Hillary

Background information
- Origin: Kuala Lumpur, Malaysia
- Genres: J-pop; M-pop
- Years active: 2024–present
- Labels: 48 Entertainment SDN. BHD. (2024–present); Sony Music Malaysia Sdn. Bhd. (distributor, 2024–present)
- Member of: AKB48 Group
- Members: See List
- Website: https://klp48.my/

KLP48 (read as K.L.P. Forty-Eight) is a Malaysian idol girl group based in Kuala Lumpur. They are the tenth international sister group of AKB48, after Indonesia's JKT48, China's SNH48 (dissociated), Thailand's BNK48, Philippines's MNL48, China's TSH48, Taiwan's TPE48, Vietnam's SGO48 (disbanded), Thailand's CGM48, and India's DEL48 (disbanded). The group was announced on January 1, 2024. The 1st generation members were announced on July 27, 2024.

== History ==
=== Formation and early days (2024–present) ===
KLP48 (short for Kuala Lumpur) was announced on January 1, 2024, as the 10th international sister group of the Japanese idol group AKB48, marking the first sister group in Malaysia.The group is managed by 48 Entertainment SDN. BHD.

On April 17, 2024, the transfer of four members from other AKB48 groups to KLP48 was announced. The members included AKB48's Haruka Kurosu, Yurina Gyoten, Suzuha Yamane, and STU48's Kokoa Kai. Their official transfer date was on June 1, 2024.

Former AKB48 and SKE48 member Jurina Matsui was announced as KLP48's player manager in the same month. This partnership was later terminated on July 11, 2024. In April, they announced that they will have their first theater in Lalaport Bukit Bintang City Centre, which opened on 28 December 2025.

== Members ==
=== 1st generation ===
The first generation members were formally announced on 27 July 2024.

Stage name	Birth name	Birth date	Birth place	Note
Amanda	Elley Amanda Wong	13 February 2007 (age 19)	Kuala Lumpur, Malaysia	
Ann Drea	Ann Drea Tey	6 August 2008 (age 18)	Selangor, Malaysia	
(Indonesia) Devi	Made Devi Ranita Ningtara	18 November 2000 (age 25)	Bali, Indonesia	Former JKT48 member Oldest member of the group
(Hong Kong) Hillary	Shuen Hiu Yau (孫曉柔, Syun1 Hiu2 Jau)	22 November 2008 (age 17)	Hong Kong, China	
Khalies	Tan Zi Tong	27 August 2008 (age 18)	Kuala Lumpur, Malaysia	
Salwa	Salwa Sunanda	17 July 2007 (age 19)	Kuala Lumpur, Malaysia	
Tiffany	Elvyone Tiffany Ticha Anak Donaldin	23 September 2009 (age 16)	Sarawak, Malaysia	
Yi Shyan	Foo Yi Shyan	28 June 2004 (age 22)	Perak, Malaysia	Group Captain

=== 2nd generation ===
The second generation members were formally announced by Amanda and Hillary (2 first generation members) on KLP48's official YouTube Channel on 24 September 2025.

Stage name	Birth name	Birth date	Birth place	Note
(Kazakhstan) Aisha	Turysbek Aisha (Тұрысбек Айша)	25 May 2008 (age 18)	Almaty, Kazakhstan	
Alice	Alice Wong Vei Yew	30 April 2004 (age 22)	Selangor, Malaysia	
(Indonesia) Cindy	Cindy Alexandria	17 May 2008 (age 18)	South Tangerang, Banten, Indonesia	Former UPgirls trainee (with her stagename was "Icy") Currently on Hiatus. (Since 11 August 2026)
(Indonesia) Diva	Diva Nurhaliza	11 May 2004 (age 22)	Cirebon, West Java, Indonesia	Former member of Twenty Nine Teens (2022) and UPgirls (with her stagename was "Liz", 2023)
(Indonesia) Hana	Sekar Wejayanti Mumtahanah	24 February 2004 (age 22)	Tegal, Central Java, Indonesia	
Isabel	Wee Xi Ting	11 September 2008 (age 18)	Kuala Lumpur, Malaysia	
Joo	Jocelyna Marcelly	27 November 2005 (age 20)	Sabah, Malaysia	
(Indonesia) Kei	Kei Annisa Adnan	16 April 2009 (age 17)	Selangor, Malaysia	
Maia	Maia Fae Chong	6 October 2010 (age 15)	Selangor, Malaysia	Youngest member of the group
(Japan) Mashiro	Mashiro Ueda (植田真白, Ueda Mashiro)	29 January 2003 (age 23)	Nara, Japan	Former member of WONDER∞WANDER (2021) and iiiidolll (2024); Concurrent position with QUADLIPS (since 2025).
Sharleez	Sharifah Sharleez Binty Syed Affendi	19 February 2009 (age 17)	Kuala Lumpur, Malaysia	
Shu Zhen	Kuak Shu Zhen	20 August 2001 (age 25)	Perak, Malaysia	
Tara	Tara Tan	2 August 2010 (age 16)	Selangor, Malaysia	

== Former Members ==
=== 2025 Graduates ===
Stage name	Birth name	Birth date	Birth place	Generations	Status	Membership history
Lucine	Mireille Chin Yi Ling	11 November 2004 (age 21)	Kuala Lumpur, Malaysia	1st	Graduated on 19 October 2025	(27 July 2024 – 19 October 2025)

=== 2026 Graduates ===
Stage name	Birth name	Birth date	Birth place	Generations	Status	Membership history
(Japan) Cocoa	Kokoa Kai (甲斐心愛, Kai Kokoa)	28 November 2003 (age 22)	Hiroshima, Japan	1st (STU48)	Transferred back to STU48 on 1 March 2026	(1 June 2024 - 1 March 2026)
(Japan) Haruka	Haruka Kurosu (黒須遥香, Kurosu Haruka)	28 February 2001 (age 25)	Saitama, Japan	16th (AKB48)	Transferred back to AKB48 on 1 March 2026	(1 June 2024 - 1 March 2026)
(Japan) Suzuha	Suzuha Yamane (山根涼羽, Yamane Suzuha)	11 August 2000 (age 26)	Hyogo, Japan	16th (AKB48)	Transferred back to AKB48 on 1 March 2026	(1 June 2024 - 1 March 2026)
(Japan) Yurina	Yurina Gyoten (行天優梨奈, Gyoten Yurina)	14 March 1999 (age 27)	Kagawa, Japan	Team 8 (AKB48)	Transferred back to AKB48 on 1 March 2026	(1 June 2024 - 1 March 2026)

== Discography ==
=== Extended plays ===
List of Extended plays, showing album name, album details, and track list
Album	Details	Track list
First Cry	Released: June 13, 2025; Formats: Digital download, streaming	1. "Aitakatta" (Japanese ver.); 2. "Shonichi" (Chinese ver.); 3. "High Tension" (Japanese ver.); 4. "Namida Surprise" (English ver.)

=== Singles ===
#	Title	Details
1	"Heavy Rotation"	Released: August 16, 2024; Formats: Digital download, streaming
2	"Alasanku Maybe"	Released: April 18, 2025; Formats: Digital download, streaming
3	"Flying Get"	Released: May 30, 2025; Formats: Digital download, streaming
4	"Oh My Pumpkin!"	Released: August 13, 2025; Formats: Digital download, streaming
5	"Green Flash"	Released: September 12, 2025; Formats: Digital download, streaming
6	"Kerana Ku Suka"	Released: June 3, 2026; Formats: Digital download, streaming
7	"Jeritan Permata Intan"	To be released
