= DEL48 =

Indian idol group

- Origin: Delhi, India
- Genres: Pop, Indian pop, J-pop, teen pop, bubblegum pop
- Years active: 2019–2022
- Labels: YKBK48 Entertainment Pvt Ltd
- Members: DEL48 Members
- Past members: See more...
- Website: del48.com

DEL48 (read D.E.L. Forty-Eight) was an Indian idol group whose name is derived from its based city in New Delhi, India. They are the ninth international sister group of AKB48, after Indonesia's JKT48, China's SNH48 (former), Thailand's BNK48, Philippines's MNL48, China's TSH48, Taiwan's TPE48, Vietnam's SGO48 (disbanded), and Thailand's CGM48. Adopting the concept of "idols you can meet". Formed in 2019, the group went on a hiatus in October 2020 due to the COVID-19 pandemic and later disbanded in July 2022.

== History ==
=== 2018: Planning of MUM48 ===
During a livestream in December 2017, AKB48's general manager Yui Yokoyama announced the formation of MUM48, AKB48's supposed 8th sister group based in Mumbai, India. The group will be operated by Rashmi Raj Media Pvt. Ltd., a company by producer Rashmi Sharma. An event was held to promote the group, with "girls power" and "women empowerment" as the theme of the group. Audition was soon held, but stopped abruptly in July 2018; the website became inaccessible and their social media platform stopped posting.

=== 2019: Creation of DEL48 and MUB48 ===
On 19 June 2019, an event was held to announce the formation of DEL48 and MUB48. Both groups will be managed by AKS and YKBK48 Entertainment Pvt. ltd., a company headquartered in Gurgaon, with Yoshiya Kato serving as chairman and Rohit Bakshi as CEO of the company. The groups would be an addition to the AKB48 overseas sister group, following JKT48, BNK48, MNL48, AKB48 Team SH, AKB48 Team TP, SGO48, and CGM48. The groups took their name from the proposed base location of New Delhi and Mumbai, India. The groups are based on the concept of 'idols with whom fans can meet' and will be involved in the entertainment industry including theater performance, concert, other entertainment events, music record release, movies, media appearance, etc. Following the announcement, DEL48 launched its own YouTube channel and announced that it would be accepting applications from girls aged between 12 and 20. The first round of the first DEL48 audition took place from 19 to 31 July 2019, attracting more than 10,000 applicants. Each audition was five-minutes long, consisting of a singing, acting, and dancing test.

Ahead of AKB48's performance on NHK's 2019 Kouhaku Uta Gassen, it was announced the performance will also include a member of DEL48. On 30 December 2019, Glory is introduced in AKB48's theater in Tokyo, becoming the first member to be revealed. The remaining 21 members were announced the next day, while Glory performed with AKB48 Group to sing Koi Suru Fortune Cookie. The group was confirmed to debut in Spring 2020 by Glory in a Japanese interview.

=== 2020–2022: Debut plans, hiatus, and disbandment ===
The plan to debut the group in early 2020 was postponed as a result of the COVID-19 pandemic. The group released its Overture in March 2020, followed by the release of its members' official Instagram and TikTok page. An official TikTok page for the group was also opened, featuring the members dancing to AKB48 and BNK48's Koi Suru Fortune Cookie and the latter's High Tension. The group later began a weekly upload on their Instagram and YouTube page with each members having their own contents.

In May 2020, DEL48 members, Reyna, Glory and Beanie, were featured alongside their sister groupmates in AKB48's performance on One Love Asia, an online charity concert organized by WebTVAsia and YouTube as part of UNICEF ASIA's #Reimagine global campaign to raise funds for children and families affected by the pandemic.

In early October 2020, DEL48 members stopped posting on the group's official Instagram page and reopened their personal accounts, leading to rumors about disbandment. DEL48's producer, Deepak Nandal, later confirmed that YKBK48 Entertainment had terminated its members' contract. He also confirmed the group have recorded its debut music video, an Indian version of Flying Get. However, on 16 October 2020, DEL48 issued an official statement confirming the group is on indefinite suspension with the possibility of coming back in the future.

On 13 July 2022, it was announced YKBK48 Entertainment Pvt. Ltd. will be closing up its operation, officially ending DEL48 and MUB48.

== Members ==
On 30 December 2019, the first generation of the group was announced, consisting of 22 members.

1st Generation members
Stage name	Katakana	Birth name	Birth date (age)
Akki	アッキ	Aakanksha Bakshi (アーカンクシャ・バクシー)	14 June 1997 (age 28)
Anvi	アンヴィ	Sanvi Arora (サンヴィ・アロラ)	8 August 1998 (age 27)
Ashley	アシュレイ	Ashwin Virk (アシュウィン・ヴィルク)	26 August 2005 (age 20)
Beanie	ビーニー	Binita Budathoki (ビニダ・ブダトキ)	16 November 1996 (age 29)
Coco	ココ	Manasvini Pant (マナスヴァニ・パント)	9 April 2001 (age 24)
Eli	エリ	Eliza Sehgal (エリザ・セガル)	21 September 1997 (age 28)
Elsa	エルサ	Dhwani Singh (ドゥワニ・シン)	15 March 2002 (age 23)
Frey	フレイ	Freya Grover (フレヤ・グローバー)	5 October 2000 (age 25)
Glitter	グリッター	Vidushi (ビドゥシ)	12 October 2002 (age 23)
Glory	グローリー	Khushi Dua (クシ・ドゥア)	27 August 2003 (age 22)
Grace	グレース	Diksha Parmar (ディクシャ・パルマー)	27 October 1997 (age 28)
IKA	イカ	Bhavika Chadha (バヴィカ・チャダ)	27 September 1998 (age 27)
Iqra	イクラ	Iqra Khan (イクラ・カン)	22 May 2005 (age 20)
Kwin	クウィン	Sonali Singh (ソナリ・シン)	1 January 1998 (age 28)
Manna	マンナ	Mannat Sandhu (マンナト・サンドゥ)	21 December 1996 (age 29)
Mishaa	ミシャー	Mahika Sharma (マビカ・シャルマ)	12 November 1998 (age 27)
Mithu	ミトゥー	Loveena Nandwani (ロビナ・ナントワニ)	1 August 1998 (age 27)
Nina	ニーナ	Sonali Talwar ソナリ・タルワール	17 May 1997 (age 28)
Rach	ラチ	Rachna (ラチュナ)	23 December 1996 (age 29)
Reyna	レイナ	Shivangi Negi (シヴァンギ・ネギ)	2 July 1999 (age 26)
Sasha	サシャ	Samragyi Bansal (サムラキィ・バンサル)	30 October 2000 (age 25)
Tina	ティナ	Kiran (キラン)	16 August 1996 (age 29)
