= Cerita Cinta di Teater Idola =

- Genre: Drama; Television series
- Written by: Cassandra Massardi; Rizky H. Pratama; Fannyco
- Directed by: Thomas Nawilis; Thaleb Wirachman
- Starring: Novi Herlina; Christian Loho; Masaji Wijayanto; Adhi Sastro; Jessica Veranda; Nadya Arina; Ben Kasyafani; Nobuyuki Suzuki; Haruka Nakagawa; Bobby Samuel; Bacun Hakim; Member and staff of JKT48
- Opening theme: Kamu Yang Memberi Tahu Aku – JKT48 Tim J
- Country of origin: Indonesia
- Original language: Bahasa Indonesia

Production
- Executive producer: Dody Firmansah
- Producers: Melody N. Laksani; Andica Giovanni
- Production location: Indonesia
- Cinematography: Dede S. Chandra
- Editor: Gita Miaji (GITSTUDIO)
- Running time: 60 min. (with adv.)
- Production companies: Dentsu Aegis Network Indonesia; AKS, Co., Ltd. i-ma-gin-e Films

Original release
- Network: Indonesia NET. Japan TBS
- Release: 2018

Cerita Cinta di Teater Idola is a television series aired on NET. In collaboration with i-ma-gin-e Films, AKS, Co., Ltd., and Dentsu Inter Admark. The series also featured the 6th anniversary of JKT48 Theater. This series starred by Novi Herlina, Christian Loho, Masaji Wijayanto, Adhi Sastro, Jessica Veranda, Nadya Arina, and others. The series also involves the members of JKT48 who also joined the acting.

== Synopsis ==
The figure of a woman named Karin (Novi Herlina) with her work as a junior creative leader in the biggest idol group in Indonesia, JKT48 does not make it difficult. With her subtle, courteous nature, and creative thinking, she always making new colors for the members of JKT48, along with her close friend 10 years, Reva (Jessica Veranda) and Windy (Nadya Arina). The three of them were originally incorporated in a local Japanese group idol, named "3Sakura", until finally 5 years later decided the group had disbanded based on the management decision that overshadowed the local group due to the popularity of national group idol like JKT48, so Karin and 2 friends also split up. 5 years did not meet, he reunited in one place the teen idol achieve dreams.

However, his work was briefly blocked by love. While chasing time to the JKT48 Theater, Karin hurriedly bumped into a JKT48 fan named Robby (Christian Loho), along with 2 colleagues Kevin (Masaji Wijayanto) and Gio (Adhi Sastro). That's where the love journey in the theater begins. Will Karin and Robby make a special relationship?
