= Vernalossom =

Japanese talent agency

Vernalossom Co., Ltd.
- Native name: 株式会社Vernalossom
- Romanized name: Kabushiki-gaisha Vernalossom
- Formerly: AKS Co., Ltd. (2006-2020)
- Type: Kabushiki gaisha
- Industry: Service industry
- Founded: January 20, 2006; 20 years ago
- Headquarters: Sotokanda, Chiyoda, Tokyo, Japan
- Key people: Natsuko Yoshinari (President)
- Brands: AKB48 Group members outside Japan
- Services: Artist management
- Owner: Natsuko Yoshinari
- Website: vernalossom.jp

Vernalossom Co., Ltd. (株式会社 Vernalossom, Kabushiki-gaisha Vernalossom), formerly AKS Co., Ltd. (株式会社AKS, Kabushiki-gaisha AKS), is a Japanese talent agency headquartered in Tokyo, Japan. The company is involved in various entertainment-related industries, including music, film and merchandise production.

== History ==
AKS has managed the Japanese idol groups AKB48, SKE48, NMB48, HKT48, and NGT48, as well as the Japanese promotional activities of South Korean-Japanese idol group, Iz*One.

AKB48 employed a so-called "transfer system" for the first to tenth generation members, where members started out under AKS management, and should receive a contract offer from other artist management companies after a predetermined period. Members in the next generations would be managed directly by AKS, although they could still accept offers to transfer to other agencies.

In 2016, ownership of NMB48 was transferred from Kyoraku Yoshimoto Holdings to AKS, putting all the 48 groups at the time under AKS's banner.

In 2019, the talent agency KeyHolder acquired SKE48 and placed it under the management of its subsidiary SKE, Inc., renamed in June to Zest, Inc.; AKS received a 20% stake in the subsidiary. It was also announced that Yasushi Akimoto is no longer part of AKS management, but still being involved as the creative producer. In June, NMB48 was sold back to Kyoraku Yoshimoto Holdings.

In 2020, AKS was restructured into Vernalossom and transferred ownership of their three remaining Japanese idol groups to three independent business entities, while Vernalossom would retain control of the AKB48 sister groups outside Japan. AKB48 would be managed by DH, headed by Kazuki Uchimura, who is also the CEO of the AKB48 Group costume maker, Osare Company. HKT48 would be managed by Mercury and NGT48 by Flora, both of which are subsidiaries of the holding company Sproot, itself co-owned by Line Corporation, Septeni Holdings, and the advertising company Piala. In May, it was announced that KeyHolder has also bought out Vernalossom's subsidiary North River, Inc., a transportation company which also owned 50% of Nogizaka46's management company.

On 1 April 2023, it was announced on Vernalossom's homepage that all of the company's business operations would be transferred to a branch subsidiary company named Superball, effective from the same day.

== Artists ==
=== Current artists (under the Superball brand) ===
==== Units ====
- JKT48 (2011–present) (based in Jakarta, Indonesia, with PT Indonesia Musik Nusantara (part of IDN))
- BNK48 (2017–present) (based in Bangkok, Thailand, with Independent Artist Management (iAM))
- TSH48 (2018–present) (previously AKB48 Team SH, based in Shanghai, China, with Shanghai Sengyu Culture Development (AKB48 China))
- TPE48 (2018–present) (based in Taipei, Taiwan, with Soundwave)
- CGM48 (2019–present) (based in Chiang Mai, Thailand, with Independent Artist Management (iAM))
- QUADLIPS (2024–present) (based in Bangkok, Thailand)
- KLP48 (2024–present) (based in Kuala Lumpur, Malaysia, with 48 Entertainment Sdn. Bhd.)

=== Former artists ===
==== Pre-Superball (until 2023) ====
- AKB48 (Transfer to DH, Co. Ltd.)
- SKE48 (Transfer to Keyholder/ZEST, Co. Ltd.)
- NMB48 (Transfer to Kyoraku Yoshimoto, Co. Ltd.)
- HKT48 (Transfer to Mercury, Co. Ltd.)
- NGT48 (Transfer to Flora, Co. Ltd.)
- SDN48 (2010–2012)
- IZ*ONE (2018–2021, co-managed by Off The Record)
- Sakura Miyawaki (Transfer to A.M. Entertainment in Japan and SOURCE MUSIC in South Korea (with LE SSERAFIM))
- Hitomi Honda (Transfer to DH, Co. Ltd. in Japan, now under iNKODE in South Korea)
- DEL48 (2019–2020)
- SGO48 (2018–2021)
- MNL48 (2018–2026)
- Nako Yabuki (transferred to Twin Planet)

==== Superball era (since 2023) ====
- MNL48 (2018–2026) (based in Manila, Philippines, with P.O.S Inc.)
- Cocoa Kai (STU48 member, former KLP48 member, transferred to Next Leap)
