= CGM48 =

Thai idol girl group

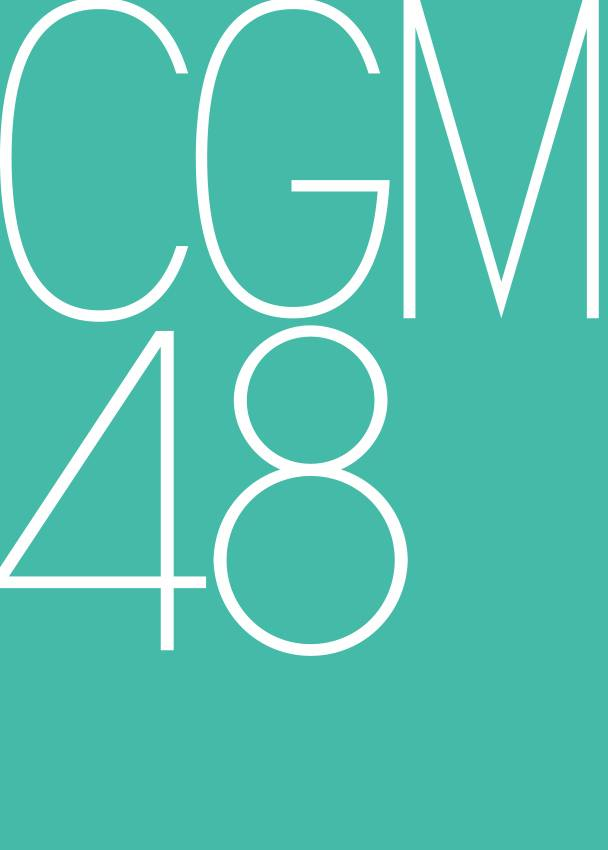
- CGM48 Logo

Background information
- Origin: Chiang Mai, Thailand
- Genres: Teen-pop; J-pop; T-pop; Bubblegum Pop
- Years active: 2019–present
- Label: iAM
- Members: 22 (list)
- Past members: 28 (list)
- Website: https://cgm48official.com/

CGM48 (read C.G.M. Forty-eight) is a Thai idol girl group. It is the first domestic sister group of the Thai idol group BNK48, and the eighth international sister group of AKB48, after Indonesia's JKT48, China's SNH48 (former), Thailand's BNK48, Philippines's(disbanded) MNL48, China's TSH48, Taiwan's TPE48, and Vietnam's SGO48 (disbanded). The group is named after Chiang Mai, a city in Northern Thailand, where it will be based.

== Formation ==
The formation of the group was announced at a BNK48 event in Chiang Mai on 2 June 2019. On 10 June 2019, it was announced that BNK48 members Izurina and Aom would be transferred to the group as its manager and leader, respectively. The first audition of the group took place from 15 June to 15 July 2019.

== Members ==
=== Team C ===
Stage name	Birth name	Birth date (age)	Gen.	BNK48 Election rank			Remarks
Stage name	Birth name	Birth date (age)	Gen.	4	5	6	Remarks
Else (Thai: เอลฟ์)	Ananya Kusolkrong (Thai: อนัญญา กุศลครอง)	12 August 2003 (age 23)	4th			43	
Ginna (Thai: จีนน่า)	Munchupa Moonklang (Thai: มัญชุภา มูลกลาง)	10 December 2006 (age 19)	2nd	64	45	56	
Jingjing (Thai: จิงจิง)	Arunya Kaewmalai (Thai: อรัญญา เเก้วมาลัย)	30 January 2002 (age 24)	2nd	30	26	35	Team C Captain
Kwan (Thai: ขวัญ)	Thidatip Jiraphan (Thai: ธิดาทิพย์ จิระพันธุ์)	4 March 2008 (age 18)	3rd		43	40	
Lingling (Thai: หลิงหลิง)	Sirathreethip Panachanapat (Thai: ศิรตรีทิพย์ พนาชนาภัทร์)	20 July 2002 (age 24)	3rd		40	23	
Lookked (Thai: ลูกเกด)	Pimlapas Suwannoi (Thai: พิมพ์ลภัส สุวรรณน้อย)	6 July 2000 (age 26)	2nd	17	30	25	CGM48 Captain; Oldest member of the group
Nana (Thai: นานา)	Penpichaya Boonsaner (Thai: เพ็ญพิชญา บุญเสนอ)	27 February 2003 (age 23)	2nd	23	14	14	CGM48 Vice Captain
Nisha (Thai: นิชา)	Nutthanisha Supapong (Thai: ณัฏฐณิชา สุภาพงษ์)	4 September 2009 (age 17)	4th			34	
Prae (Thai: แพร)	Nattapond Pinyoying (Thai: ณัฐภรณ์ ภิญโญยิ่ง)	3 January 2005 (age 21)	3rd		46	17	Team C Vice Captain
Ploen (Thai: เพลิน)	Panalee Aksornvanich (Thai: ปณลี อักษรวนิช)	26 February 2008 (age 18)	3rd		35	32	

=== Trainees ===
Stage name	Birth name	Birth date (age)	Gen.	BNK48 Election rank			Remarks
Stage name	Birth name	Birth date (age)	Gen.	4	5	6	Remarks
Emma (Thai: เอมม่า)	Sasicha Wongwatanaanan (Thai: ศศิชา วงศ์วัฒนอนันต์)	12 February 2004 (age 22)	2nd	63	42	9	
Hongyok (Thai: หงษ์หยก)	Hongyok Khuanpradit (Thai: หงษ์หยก ควรประดิษฐ์)	27 January 2004 (age 22)	4th			55	
Praifa (Thai: ปลายฟ้า)	Kawintra Keereesattayakul (Thai: กวินตรา คีรีสัตยกุล)	4 January 2012 (age 14)	4th			45	
Satangpound (Thai: สตางค์ปอนด์)	Matatsinee Aowtrakul (Thai: เมธัสสินี อ่าวตระกูล)	26 October 2007 (age 19)	4th			54	
Shenae (Thai: ชีเน่)	Pawarisa Singphet (Thai: ปวริศา สิงห์เพ็ชร)	7 November 2006 (age 20)	4th			37	
Valentine (Thai: วาเลนไทน์)	Ranchana Keereesattayakul (Thai: รัญชนา คีรีสัตยกุล)	14 February 2008 (age 18)	4th			47	
Chifa (Thai: ชิฟา)	Jinnipa Jongpum (Thai: จิณห์นิภา จงพุ่ม)	17 October 2008 (age 18)	5th			58	
Lewlew (Thai: หลิวหลิว)	Nutnicha Lertkiattikun (Thai: ณัฐณิชา เลิศเกียรติคุณ)	24 December 2006 (age 19)	5th			38	
Namphet (Thai: น้ำเพชร)	Phetphailin Makmee (Thai: เพชรไพลิน มากมี)	24 February 2008 (age 18)	5th			51	
Punpon (Thai: ปันผล)	Patcharasron Kengtangdee (Thai: พัชรสรณ์ เก่งทางดี)	12 January 2009 (age 17)	5th			53	
Tara (Thai: ธารา)	Tara Kokeatimanon (Thai: ธารา โฆเกียรติมานนท์)	5 June 2013 (age 13)	5th			57	Youngest member of the group

== Former members ==
Like its sister group, the leaving of the group is known as graduation. The graduated members are as follows:

Stage name	Birth name	Birth date (age)	Gen.	Graduation date	Ref		
Nicha (Thai: ณิชา)	Nicharee Sungkhathat Na Ayudhya (Thai: ณิชารีย์ สังขทัต ณ อยุธยา)	26 August 2004 (age 22)	Gen.	Graduation date	Ref	1st	12 December 2021 (resigned)
Pepo (Thai: ปีโป้)	Jirattikan Tasee (Thai: จิรัฐิกาล ทะสี)	21 September 2006 (age 20)	1st	31 March 2022			
Parima (Thai: ปะริมะ)	Chutipapha Rattanakornyannawut (Thai: ชุติปภา รัตนกรญาณวุฒิ)	29 July 2005 (age 21)	1st	16 September 2023			
Jayda (Thai: เจย์ดา)	Ravinda Alan (Thai: รวินดา อลัน)	16 December 2006 (age 19)	1st	7 October 2023			
Twobam (Thai: ทูแบม)	Pitchaporn Whathanathongtin (Thai: พิชชาพร วัฒนาทองทิน)	10 February 2006 (age 20)	2nd	8 October 2023			
Milk (Thai: มิลค์)	Chayanan Jedpeenongruamjai (Thai: ชยานันท์ เจ็ดพี่น้องร่วมใจ)	6 December 2005 (age 20)	1st	11 January 2024 (dismissed)			
Aom (Thai: ออม)	Punyawee Jungcharoen (Thai: ปุณยวีร์ จึงเจริญ)	20 September 1995 (age 31)	2nd (BNK48)	30 April 2024			
Izurina (Japanese: いずりな)	Rina Izuta (Japanese: 伊豆田 莉奈)	26 November 1995 (age 30)	10th (AKB48)	7 July 2024			
Papang (Thai: พะแพง)	Suphatchaya Khamngern (Thai: ศุภัชญา คำเงิน)	17 August 2007 (age 19)	2nd	31 August 2024			
Fortune (Thai: ฟอร์จูน)	Pundita Koontawee (Thai: ปัณฑิตา คูณทวี)	18 August 1999 (age 27)	1st	31 October 2024			
Meilli (Thai: เหมยลี่)	Phichayapha Showtale (Thai: พิชญาภา โชว์ทะเล)	21 August 2008 (age 18)	4th	15 May 2025 (dismissed)			
Angel (Thai: แองเจิ้ล)	Napassanan Thambuacha (Thai: นภัสนันท์ ธรรมบัวชา)	6 April 2002 (age 24)	1st	03 September 2025			
Champoo (Thai: แชมพู)	Kodchaporn Leelatheep (Thai: กชพร ลีละทีป)	10 October 2005 (age 21)	1st	03 September 2025			
Kaiwan (Thai: ไข่หวาน)	Manita Chanchai (Thai: มานิตา จันทร์ฉาย)	6 January 2004 (age 22)	1st	03 September 2025			
Kaning (Thai: คนิ้ง)	Vithita Srasreesom (Thai: วิทิตา สระศรีสม)	15 December 2004 (age 21)	1st	03 September 2025			
Kyla (Thai: เคียล่า)	Kyla Ziyun Khoo (Thai: เคียล่า ซือหยุน คู)	25 January 2007 (age 19)	1st	03 September 2025			
Latin (Thai: ลาติน)	Pimnara Rumruaymunkong (Thai: พิมพ์นารา ร่ำรวยมั่นคง)	28 January 2006 (age 20)	1st	03 September 2025			
Marmink (Thai: มามิ้งค์)	Manichar Aimdilokwong (Thai: มาณิฌา เอี่ยมดิลกวงศ์)	7 November 1999 (age 27)	1st	03 September 2025			
Nenie (Thai: นีนี่)	Phitchayapha Supanya (Thai: พิชญาภา สุปัญญา)	1 November 2002 (age 24)	1st	03 September 2025			
Pim (Thai: พิม)	Pronwarin Wongtrakulkit (Thai: พรวารินทร์ วงศ์ตระกูลกิจ)	25 December 2005 (age 20)	1st	03 September 2025			
Ping (Thai: ปิ๊ง)	Pinpana Saengboon (Thai: พิณพณา แสงบุญ)	25 July 2003 (age 23)	1st	03 September 2025			
Punch (Thai: พั้นซ์)	Wacharee Danphasukkul (Thai: วัชรี ด่านผาสุกกุล)	16 February 2006 (age 20)	1st	03 September 2025			
Sita (Thai: สิตา)	Sita Teeradechsakul (Thai: สิตา ธีรเดชสกุล)	25 June 2003 (age 23)	1st	03 September 2025			
Fahsai (Thai: ฟ้าใส)	Phattaratida Chongprasankiat (Thai: ภัทรธิดา จงประสานเกียรติ)	23 May 2007 (age 19)	1st	03 September 2025			
Jjae (Thai: เจเจ)	Supapit Sripairoj (Thai: ศุภาพิชญ์ ศรีไพโรจน์)	27 July 2006 (age 20)	1st	03 September 2025			
Meen (Thai: มีน)	Pitchayathida Sonthisakwanna (Thai: พิชญธิดา สนธิศักดิ์วรรณะ)	5 March 2003 (age 23)	1st	03 September 2025			
Mei (Thai: เหมย)	Rapeephan Chaemcharoen (Thai: รพีพรรณ แช่มเจริญ)	16 September 2004 (age 22)	1st	03 September 2025			
Nena (Thai: นีน่า)	Nattarika Boontua (Thai: ณัฐริกา บุญตั๋ว)	12 September 2000 (age 26)	1st	03 September 2025			
Runma (Thai: รันม่า)	Tantaya Shishida (Thai: แทนทยา ชิชิดะ)	19 January 2003 (age 23)	3rd	7 March 2026			

== Discography ==
=== Singles ===
No.	Title	Release	Album	Ref.
1	"Chiang Mai 106" (เชียงใหม่ 106)	9 February 2020	Eien Pressure	
2	"Melon Juice"	31 October 2020	Eien Pressure	
3	"Mali" (มะลิ)	21 March 2021	Eien Pressure	
4	"Maeshika Mukanee" (สุดเส้นทาง)	28 May 2022	Hisashiburi no Lip Gloss	
5	"2565"	24 December 2022	Hisashiburi no Lip Gloss	
6	"Sansei Kawaii!" (เธออะ Kawaii!)	7 June 2023	Hisashiburi no Lip Gloss	
7	"LOVE TRIP"	18 May 2024	Hokori no Oka	
8	"Sakura, Minna de Tabeta"(ซากุระแห่งความทรงจำ)	September 2024	Hokori no Oka	
9	"Totsuzen Do love me!"(โทษทีนะ...รักกันได้ไหม?)	February 2025	Hokori no Oka	
10	"Dai (Daai) Mai"(ได้ (ด้าย) ไหม)	November 2025	TBA	
11	"Koi Tsun Jatta"(Let me know!)	July 2026	TBA	

=== Special Singles ===
Year	No.	Title	Sales	Streaming
2025	CGM48's 1st Generation Special Single	"Kaze wo Matsu"		
2025	Celebrate AKB48 20th Anniversary	"Oh my pumpkin!"		

=== Music video ===
Year	Title	Director(s)	Ref(s)
2020	"Chiang Mai 106"	Chookiat Sakveerakul (Thai: ชูเกียรติ ศักดิ์วีระกุล); Boyzuke (Thai: สุรชาญ มั่นคงวงศ์ศิริ)	
2020	"Melon Juice"	Boyzuke (Thai: สุรชาญ มั่นคงวงศ์ศิริ)	
2021	"มะลิ (Mali)"	Boyzuke (Thai: สุรชาญ มั่นคงวงศ์ศิริ); Natthaphong Aroonnet (Thai: ณัฐพงษ์ อรุณเนตร์)	
2021	"ผูกพันนิรันดร์ (Eien Pressure)"	Boyzuke (Thai: สุรชาญ มั่นคงวงศ์ศิริ)	
2022	"สุดเส้นทาง (Maeshika Mukanee)"	Aussada Likitboonma (Thai: อัศฎา ลิขิตบุญมา)	
2022	"2565"	Aussada Likitboonma (Thai: อัศฎา ลิขิตบุญมา)	
2023	"จะไม่หนีจากความฝัน (Yume wa Nigenai)"	Aussada Likitboonma (Thai: อัศฎา ลิขิตบุญมา)	
2023	"เธออะ Kawaii!! (Sansei Kawaii!!)"	Aussada Likitboonma (Thai: อัศฎา ลิขิตบุญมา)	
2023	"Lip Gloss ที่คิดถึง (Hisashiburi no Lip Gloss)"	Too Aussada (Thai: อัศฎา ลิขิตบุญมา); Nutsorr (Thai: สรวิชญ์ เมืองแก้ว)	

=== With others ===
Year	Artist	Single No.	Album	Title	Member	Ref(s)
2020	BNK48, CGM48	9	Warota People	"Hashire! Penguin"	Pim, Aom, Izurina	
2020	BNK48, CGM48	9	Warota People	"Wink wa Sankai"	Fortune, Sita, Kaning, Marmink, Kaiwan	
2020	BNK48, CGM48		Warota People	"Warota People"	Kyla, Milk, Nicha, Parima, Nena	
2022	BNK48, CGM48	11	Gingham Check	"Sayonara Crawl"	Champoo (Center), Aom, Fortune, Kaning, Marmink, Sita	
2022	BNK48, CGM48	12	Gingham Check	"Believers"	Pim, Kaning, Marmink, Aom	
2022	BNK48, CGM48	12	Gingham Check	"Make Noise"	Sita, Fortune, Champoo, Izurina, Kaiwan	
2022	BNK48, CGM48	12	Gingham Check	"Kinou Yori Motto Suki"	Mei (Center), Angel, Jayda, Nenie, Ping, Punch	
2023	BNK48, CGM48		Gingham Check	"Gingham Check"	Angel (Center), Nana, Kaiwan, Champoo, Milk, Meen, Nenie, Kyla	
2023	BNK48, CGM48	15		"Kibouteki Refrain"	Kaning (Center), Fortune, Marmink, Nana, Pim, Sita	
2024	BNK48, CGM48	16		"Kiss Me!"	Pim (Center), Kaning, Sita, Punch, Marmink, Champoo, Kaiwan, Nenie	
2024	BNK48, CGM48			"Dare no Koto wo Ichiban Aishiteru?"	Lookked (Center), Fortune, Nana, Aom, Angel, Jingjing, Mei	
2024	BNK48, CGM48			"Kurumi to Dialogue"	Jjae, Meen, Izurina, Ping, Nena, Fahsai, Latin	
2025	BNK48, CGM48	19		"Colorcon Wink"	Kaning, Nenie, Champoo, Sita	
2025	BNK48, CGM48			"Chouhatsu no Aozora"	Nana, Mei	
2025	BNK48, CGM48			"11-gatsu no Anklet"	Jingjing, Lookked, Ploen	
2025	AKB48, JKT48, BNK48, MNL48, AKB48 Team SH, AKB48 Team TP, CGM48, KLP48	66		"Oh my pumpkin!"	Lookked	

=== Movie ===
Year	Title	Member	Ref.
2021	"God Bless The Trainees Too" (ห้าวเป้งจ๋า อย่าแกงน้อง)	All	
2022	"The Cheese Sisters"	Kaning, Marmink	
