= AKB48 Group =

Series of Japanese idol group

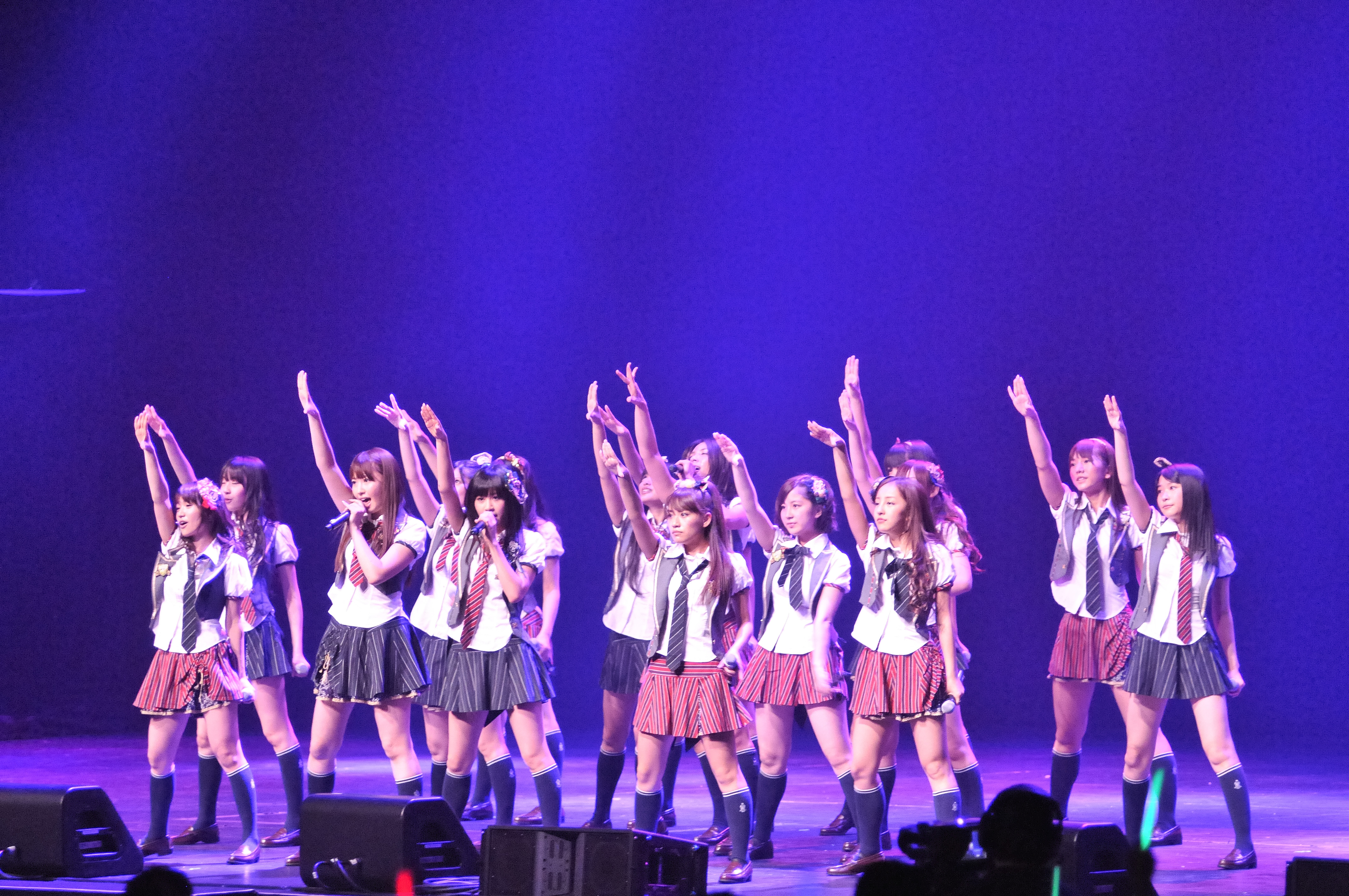
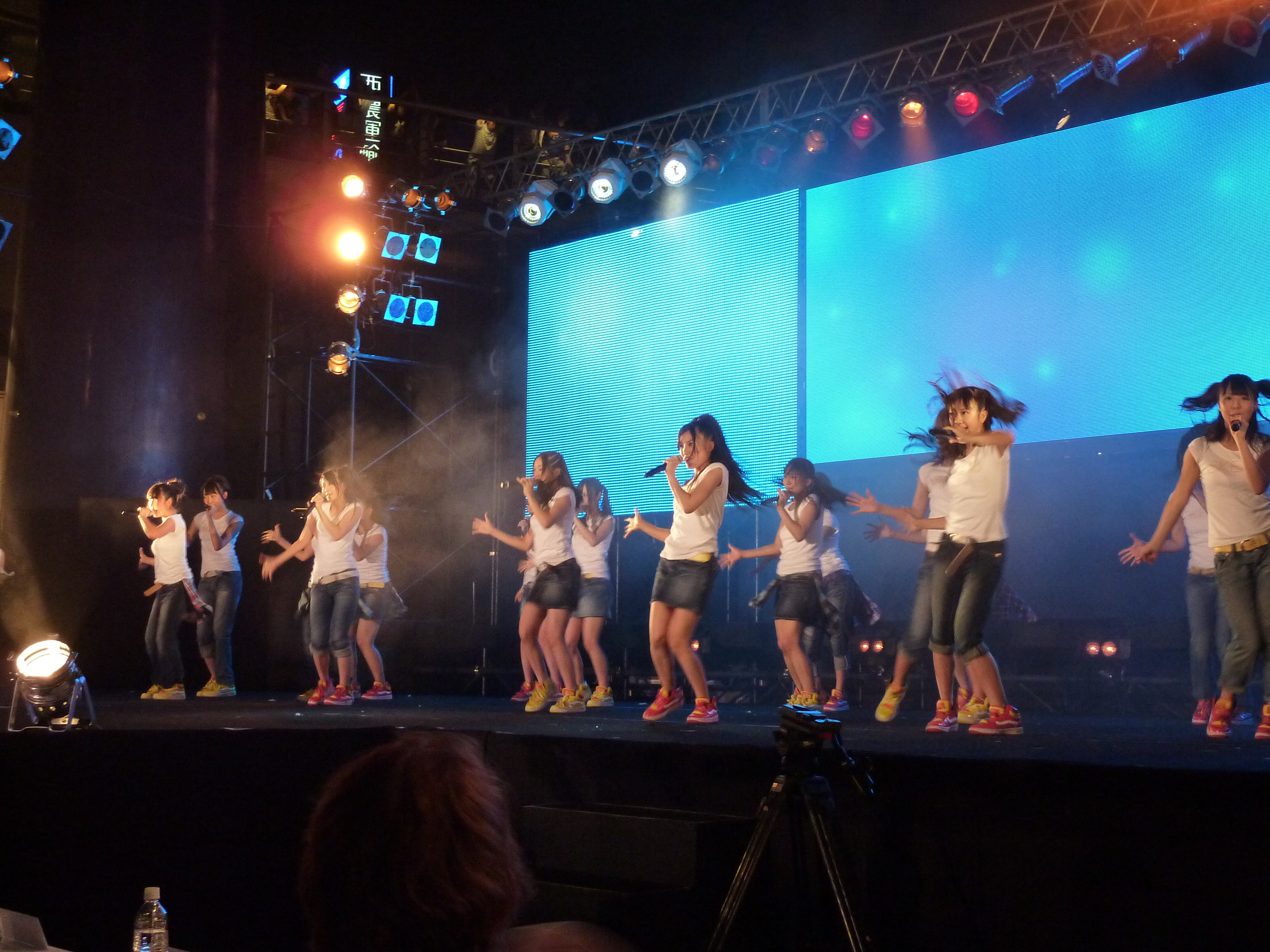
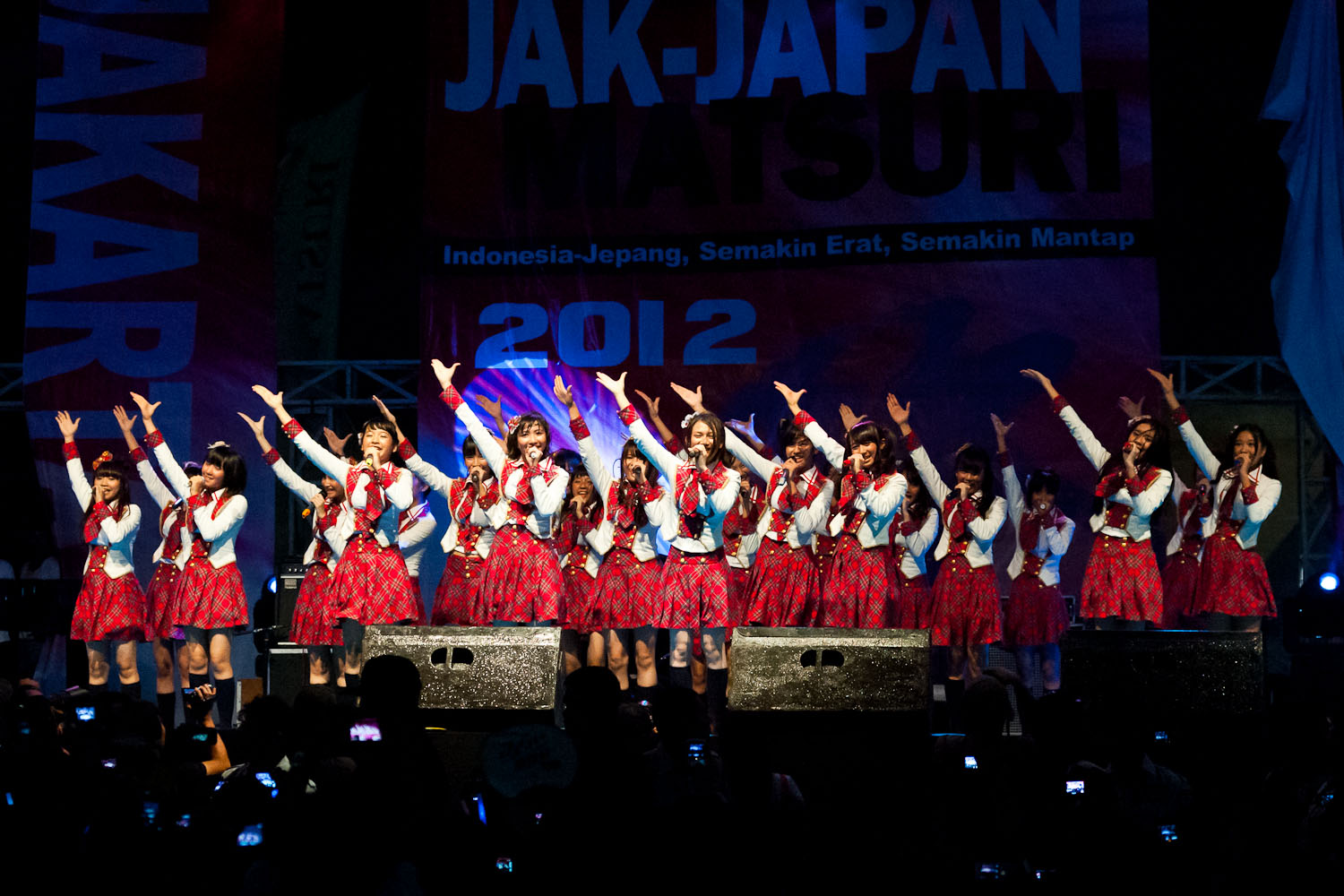
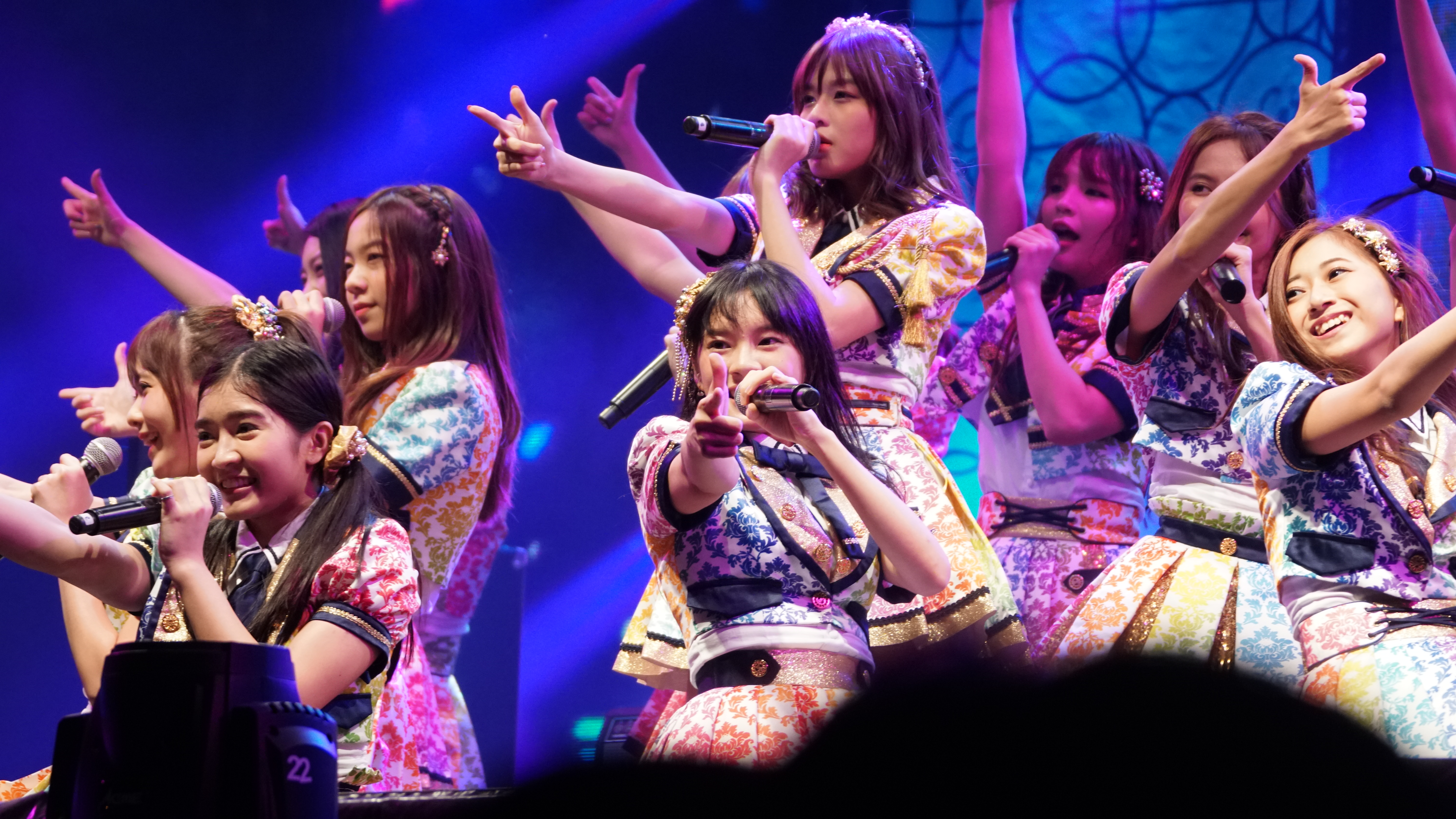
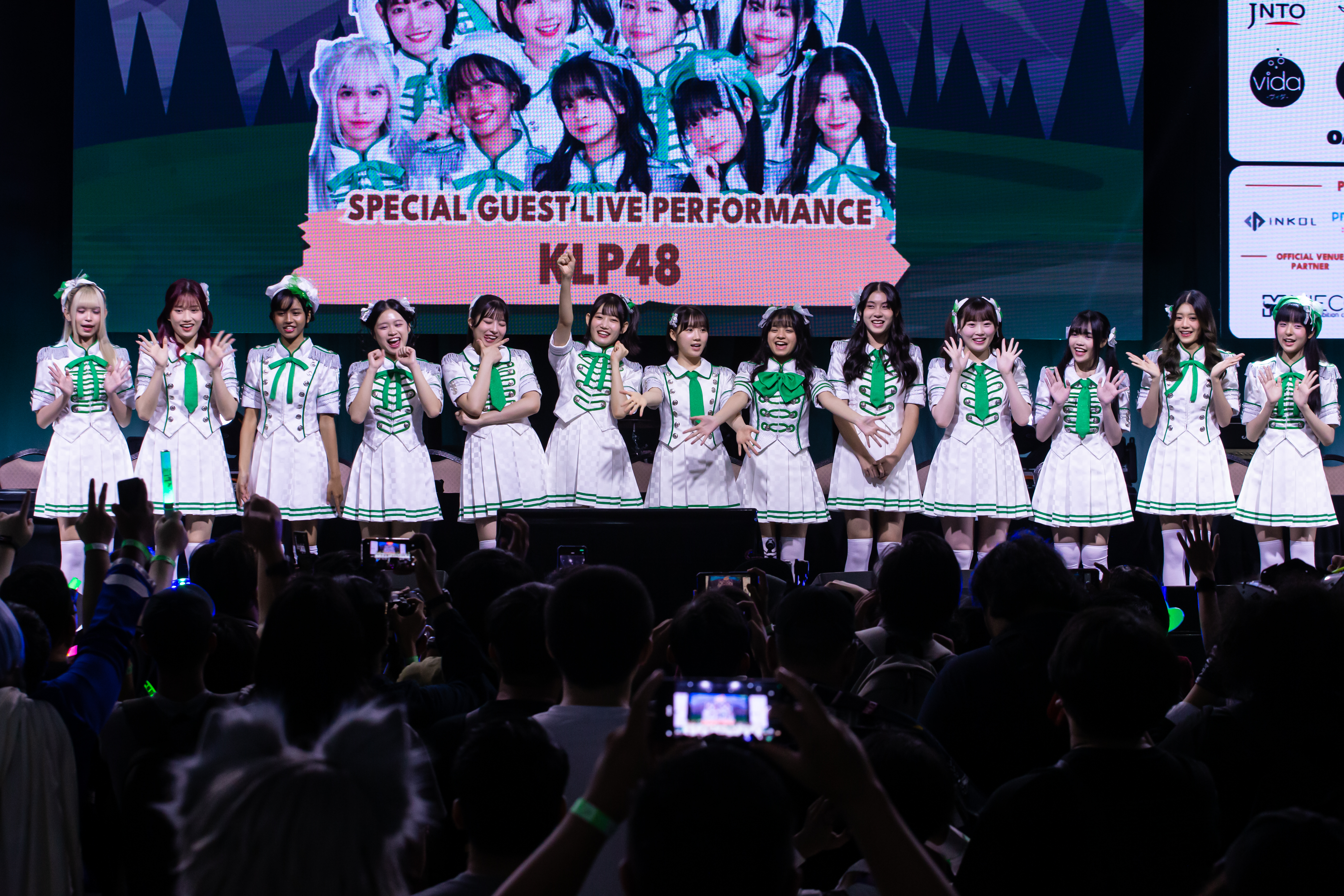
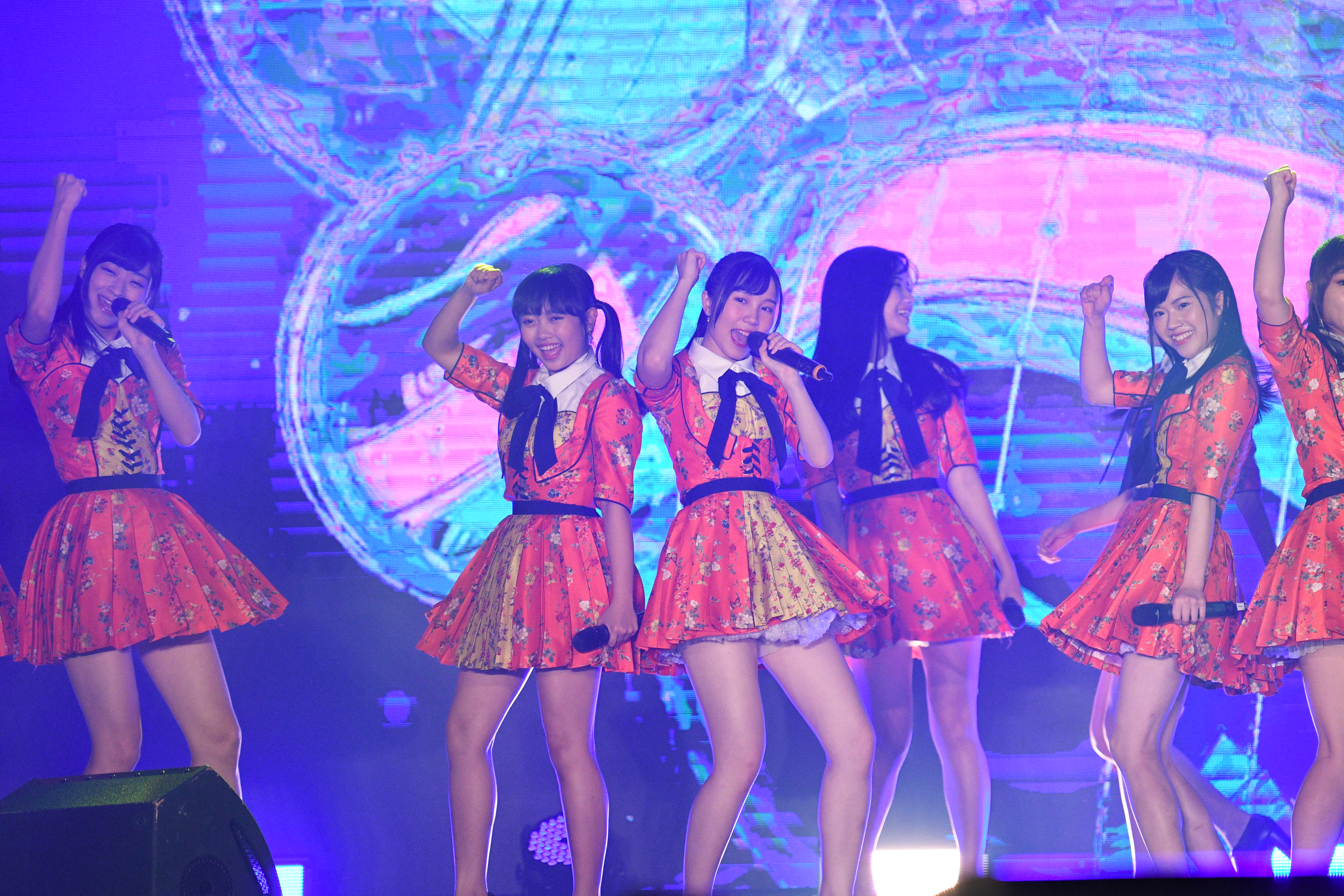
- Top left: AKB48 in Akihabara, Tokyo; Top right: SKE48 in Sakae, Nagoya; Middle left: JKT48 in Jakarta, Indonesia; Middle right: BNK48 in Bangkok, Thailand; Bottom left: KLP48 in Kuala Lumpur, Malaysia; Bottom right: TPE48 in Taipei, Taiwan

Background information
- Origin: East Asia; Japan (6, former: 1); China (1, former: 1); Taiwan (1); South Korea (former: 1); South Asia; India (former: 2); Southeast Asia; Indonesia (1); Thailand (3); Philippines (former: 1); Vietnam (former: 1); Malaysia (1)
- Genres: J-pop; electronica; dance; R&B; teen pop; bubblegum pop
- Years active: 2008–present
- Members: Current groups
- Past members: Former groups

AKB48 Group (Japanese: AKB48グループ, Hepburn: AKB48 gurūpu), or AKB48 sister groups, shortened to 48 Group or 48g, refers to the sister groups of the Japanese idol girl group AKB48. Based on the same "idols you can meet" concept, it currently consists of five sister groups in locations across Japan and six (DEL, SGO, MUB, MNL excluded) sister groups in major Asian cities overseas from Indonesia to Thailand. The Japan-based sister groups not only release their own singles, but also perform on some of the AKB48 singles and events. They also send participants in the AKB48 annual events such as the AKB48 general election. The sister groups outside Japan release local-language versions of the AKB48 singles. In their early development, they are often supported by temporary, concurrent members of AKB48, such as Jurina Matsui and Miyuki Watanabe.

== History ==
AKB48's first sister group, SKE48, was formed in 2008 with its theater in Sakae, Nagoya. SDN48 ("Saturday Night"), NMB48 ("Namba") and HKT48 ("Hakata") were later formed. NGT48 was launched in 2015, and is located in Niigata. STU48, the latest Japanese sister group, was announced during the AKB48 rock-paper-scissors tournament on October 10, 2016. It is based on the seven prefectures adjoining the coast of the Seto Inland Sea and they performed on a ship for a while. Following the assault on NGT48 member Maho Yamaguchi, the management of AKB48 faced severe public criticism. In response, it was announced to significantly change AKB48 management structures, with individual companies independently running each of the Japanese groups.

In 2011 AKB48's first sister group outside Japan, JKT48, was announced; the group is based in Jakarta, Indonesia. JKT48 was followed by SNH48 based in Shanghai, China. On June 6, 2016, AKB48 announced it had suspended its partnership with SNH48 due to the latter's contract violations. Following the statement, SNH48 declared that it had been completely independent from AKB48 from the beginning and SNH48 management had never made any form of partnership with AKS.

On October 12, 2016, AKS announced the "AKB48 China" project; two members were selected and participated in Produce 101 China. The first group of the project, AKB48 Team SH, was launched in early 2018 and audition began in April 2018.

The creation of the TPE48 was announced on October 10, 2011, in AKB48's official blog. At that time, AKS cooperated with Yoshimoto Kogyo Taipei Branch and expected to start audition in 2012. However, the two sides failed to reach a consensus in the preparation work, and thus they were discontinued after the second half of 2012. Three new overseas sister groups were announced in March 2016: BNK48, based in Bangkok, Thailand; MNL48, based in Manila, the Philippines and TPE48, based in Taipei, Taiwan. On July 30, 2018, AKS canceled a joint venture and license agreement with TPE48's management and created AKB48 Team TP. The formation of CGM48, named after and based in Chiang Mai, Thailand, as a domestic sister group of BNK48 was announced in Chiang Mai on 2 June 2019.

On December 27, 2017, Yui Yokoyama, the general manager of AKB48, announced the formation of MUM48, based in Mumbai, India, through a Showroom live broadcast. AKS cooperated with Rashmi Raj Media Pvt. ltd, and audition began in early 2018. However, the group's official site was closed in July 2018. On June 19, 2019, DEL48 and MUB48, based on India's New Delhi and Mumbai respectively, were announced. The group went on an indefinite suspension in November 2020 and later disbanded in July 2022 due to the COVID-19 pandemic.

On June 21, 2018, AKS announced the formation of SGO48, based in Ho Chi Minh City (Saigon), Vietnam. On December 5, 2021, it was announced SGO48 will disband after their 3rd anniversary on December 22, 2021, due to the COVID-19 pandemic.

On January 1, 2024, the formation of KLP48, based in Kuala Lumpur, Malaysia, was announced in AKB48's official social media accounts and KLP48's official page. They are set to debut in August 2024.

AKB48 Group also has their "official" rival group, the Sakamichi Series, also produced by Akimoto Yasushi. The Sakamichi Series consists of groups Nogizaka46, Sakurazaka46, Hinatazaka46, and Yoshimotozaka46.

SNH48 Group is also known to be a big rival against AKB48 Group: After creating their own sister groups BEJ48, GNZ48, SHY48, CKG48, CGT48, IDOLS Ft and JNR48, the group got more recognition in China. Their single "Forest Theorem" was bought 200,000 times in just a few minutes.

== Produce 48 and Iz*One ==
=== Produce 48 ===
On June 15, 2018, AKB48 groups participated in the Korean reality competition show Produce 48, which acted as the third season for the Mnet series Produce 101. The show brought in 96 girls from South Korea, Taiwan, and Japan to compete for a spot in a 12-member girl group that would promote in both Korea and Japan for two and a half years. Of those 96 contestants, 57 were from Korean talent agencies while 39 were from the AKB48 group. On August 31, 2018, the show's final episode aired and the final contestants were chosen to debut in a new group named Iz*One. Among the 12 members chosen to debut were AKB48's Hitomi Honda, HKT48's Nako Yabuki and Sakura Miyawaki.

=== Iz*One ===
Iz*One was an immediate success, with their debut showcase at the Olympic Hall selling out within minutes. On October 29, 2018, the group's first extended play COLOR*IZ was released, and sold over 34,000 units (as reported by Hanteo Chart), setting a new record for the highest number of albums sold on the first day of a Korean-based girl group's debut release. The music video for the lead single "La Vie en Rose" achieved more than 4.5 million views within 24 hours of its release on YouTube, making it the most-watched debut music video by a Korean act in 24 hours. Since their debut, the group has earned multiple awards, including Best New Artist at the Mnet Asian Music Awards.

On November 11, the group was scheduled to release their first studio album. However, the release was postponed due to the Mnet vote manipulation investigation, which revealed that the Produce 48 producer Ahn Joon-young had selected the twelve members of Iz*One from the top 20 just before the airing of the finale. As a result, Iz*One's showcases, promotions, and several guest appearances were cancelled or put on hold, which included the release of their concert film, Eyes on Me: The Movie and their Japanese promotions. On January 6, 2020, the members' agencies and CJ ENM reached an agreement to resume the group's activities. In April 2021, they officially disbanded and all 12 members returned to their respective agencies.

== Current groups ==
List of AKB48 groups based in Japan
Group name	Band color	Years active	Teams (if split)	Location (Japan)	Management company	Parent company	Label	Notes
AKB48	Pink	2005–present	Regular, Kenkyuusei/Trainee	Akihabara, Tokyo	DH, Co., Ltd.		EMI Records Japan (Universal Music Japan)	The main group
SKE48	Golden Yellow	2008–present	Team S, Team KII, Team E, Kenkyuusei	Sakae, Nagoya, Aichi	Zest, Co., Ltd.	80% Keyholder, Inc.; 20% Vernalossom, Co., Ltd.	Avex trax	First sister group
NMB48	Leopard Pattern	2010–present	Regular, Kenkyuusei	Namba, Osaka	Showtitle	Kyoraku Yoshimoto	Universal Sigma (Universal Music Japan)	The only Japanese sister group to hold their own Senbatsu General Election
HKT48	Black	2011–present	Team H, Team KIV, Kenkyuusei	Hakata, Fukuoka	Mercury, Co., Ltd.	Sproot, Co., Ltd. Shareholders: Line Corporation; Septeni Holdings; Piala, Co., Ltd.	EMI Records Japan (Universal Music Japan)	
NGT48	White – Red	2015–present	1st Generation, 3rd Draft, 2nd Generation, 3rd Generation, 4th Generation, 5th Generation, Kenkyuusei	Niigata, Niigata	Flora, Co., Ltd.	Sproot, Co., Ltd. Shareholders: Line Corporation; Septeni Holdings; Piala, Co., Ltd.	EMI Records Japan (Universal Music Japan)	Team Nlll and G were disbanded
STU48	Blue – White	2017–present	1st Generation, 3rd Draft, 2nd Generation, 2.5th Generation, 3rd Generation, 4th Generation, Kenkyuusei	Setouchi Region	STU, Co., Ltd.	Setouchi Brand Corporation	You, Be Cool! (King Records)	Currently has no permanent theater

List of AKB48 groups based outside Japan (under license from parent company Superball, a subsidiary of Vernalossom)
Group name	Band color	Years active	Teams (if split)	Management company	Label	Location	Notes
JKT48	Red	2011–present	Team Love, Team Dream, Team Passion, Trainee	IDN / JKT48 Operation Team (PT Indonesia Musik Nusantara)	IDN / JKT48 Operation Team (PT Indonesia Musik Nusantara)	Jakarta, Indonesia	First overseas sister group
BNK48	Orchid	2017–present	Team BIII, Team NV, Trainee	Independent Artist Management (iAM)	Independent Artist Management (iAM)	Bangkok, Thailand	Also has a sister group, CGM48
TSH48	Pink – White	2018–present	1st Generation, 2nd Generation, 3rd Generation, 4th Generation, 5th Generation, 6th Generation, 7th Generation, 8th Generation, 9th Generation, Trainee	Shanghai N.S.E Culture Media (NSE Cosmos)	Noi2e Lab	Shanghai, China	Replaced SNH48 in China, formerly AKB48 Team SH
TPE48	Mango – White	2018–present	Team TIII, Team P, Trainee	Soundwave	Sony Music Taiwan	Taipei, Taiwan	Previously called AKB48 Team TP
CGM48	Mint	2019–present	Team C, Trainee	Independent Artist Management (iAM)	Independent Artist Management (iAM)	Chiang Mai, Thailand	First domestic sister group of BNK48
KLP48	Green	2024–present	1st Generation, 2nd Generation	48 Entertainment Sdn. Bhd.	48 Entertainment Sdn. Bhd.	Kuala Lumpur, Malaysia	

List of AKB48 global groups
Group name	Band color	Years active	Members	Management company	Label	Location	Notes
Quadlips	White – Black	2024–present	Cole (Philippines), Fame (BNK48), Feni (JKT48) (group leader and producer), Mashiro (KLP48) (Note: Mashiro from KLP48 joined Quadlips on 1 October 2025, replacing Hina who graduated from the group on 28 September 2025 due to returning to SKE48.)	Superball	Superball	Bangkok, Thailand	First global group

== Former groups ==
List of former AKB48 groups based in Japan
Group name	Band Color	Years active with AKB48 Group	Teams (if split) / Former members	Location	Notes
SDN48	Teal	2009–2012	1st Generation, 2nd Generation (later 2nd+3rd Generation) (Note: For SDN48, the 3rd Generation members were combined with the 2nd Generation to form the "2nd+3rd Generation" stage team)	Akihabara, Tokyo, Japan	Shows for fans age 18 and up. Disbanded in 2012

List of former AKB48 groups based outside Japan
Group name	Band Color	Years active with AKB48 Group	Teams (if split) / Former members	Location	Notes
SNH48	Light Blue	2013–2016	Team SII, Team NII, Team HII, Team X, Trainee (Note: For SNH48, the team listing also include teams and sister groups formed after the divestment from AKB48)	Shanghai, China	Declared independence from AKB48 in 2016, still active
SGO48	Lotus	2018–2021	Trainee	Ho Chi Minh City (Saigon), Vietnam	FanDebut on December 22, 2018. Disbanded due to the COVID-19 pandemic in Vietnam.
Iz*One	Pink White	2018–2021	Kwon Eun-bi (group leader), Sakura Miyawaki (HKT48), Kang Hye-won, Choi Ye-na, Lee Chae-yeon, Kim Chae-won, Kim Min-ju, Nako Yabuki (HKT48), Hitomi Honda (AKB48), Jo Yu-ri, An Yu-jin, Jang Won-young	Seoul, South Korea	Formed from Produce 48
DEL48	Orange - White	2019–2020	Trainee	Delhi, India	1st generation members selected. Failed debut and indefinitely closing following cessation of operations during the COVID-19 pandemic in India.
MUB48	Green - White	-	-	Mumbai, India	Formerly MUM48. Failed to plan and indefinitely closing following cessation of operations during the COVID-19 pandemic in India.
MNL48	Blue	2018–2026	1st Generation, 2nd Generation, 3rd Generation, 4th Generation, 5th Generation	Manila, Philippines	The last activity in May 2026.

== AKB48 Group timeline ==
AKB48 Group timeline

== Distribution map ==
Geographic distribution of sister groups of AKB48 inside Japan
Geographic distribution of sister groups and a global group of AKB48 outside Japan
Geographic distribution of former sister groups of AKB48

== See also ==
- Sakamichi Series, (Nogizaka46, Sakurazaka46, and Hinatazaka46) official AKB48's rival group by the same producer
- SNH48 Group, groups under the SNH48 brand in China
- Iz*One, a South Korean-Japanese girl group formed from the television competition show Produce 48, of which its Japanese contestants were from the AKB48 groups
- List of songs recorded by AKB48
- 22/7, a voice actress idol group produced by the same producer
- Onyanko Club and Musukko Club, two groups who were popular back in the 80s and 90s produced by the same producer.
- Last Idol, an idol group from the same producer which was formed through a music competition show
