= TSH48 =

Chinese idol group

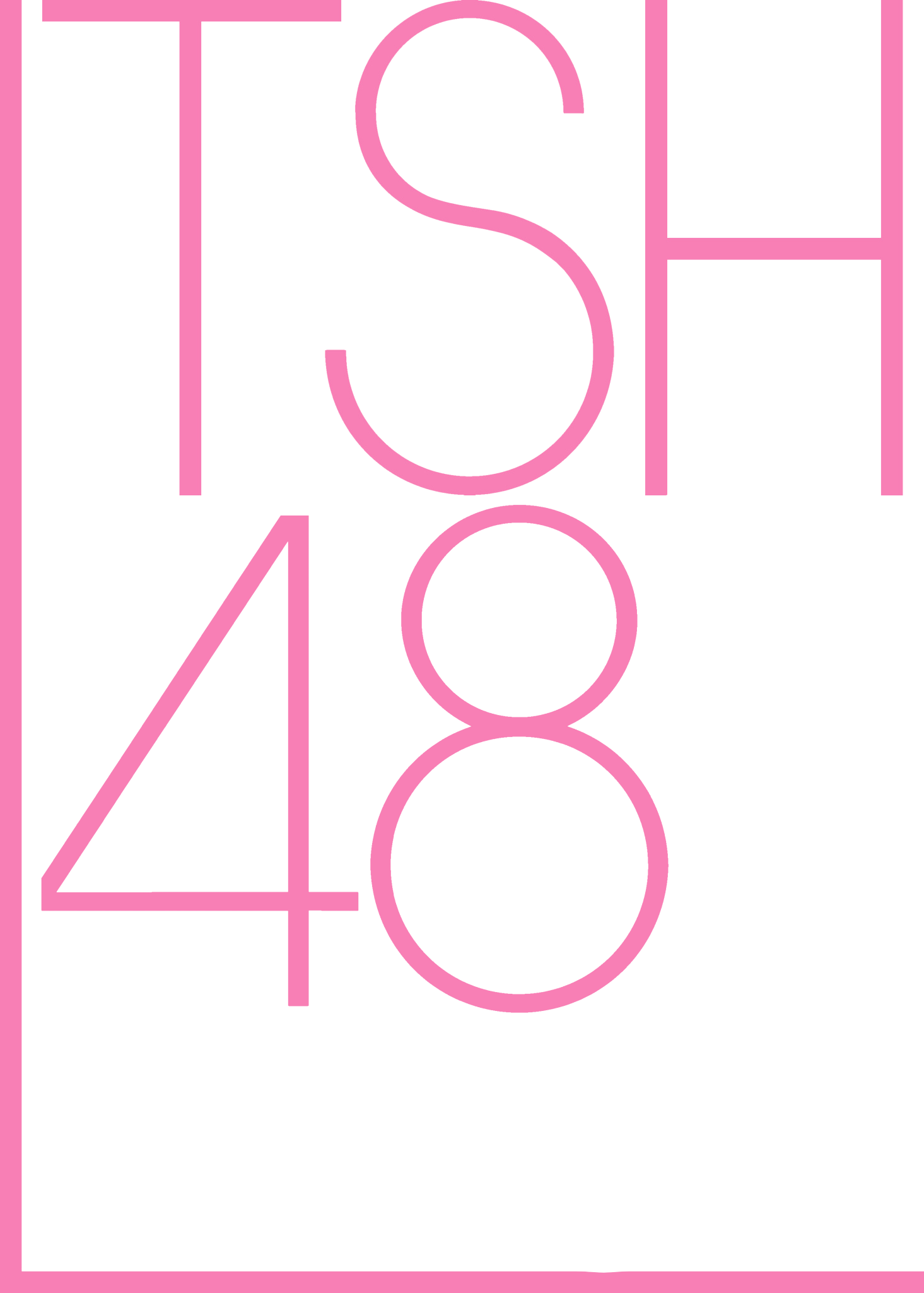

Background information
- Origin: Shanghai, China
- Genres: Pop, J-pop, Mandopop
- Years active: December 3, 2018 – present (age 7)
- Member of: AKB48 Group
- Website: TSH48 Official Webcite

TSH48 (read as T.S.H. Forty-eight), formerly known as AKB48 Team SH is a Chinese idol group based in Shanghai, China and an official sister group of the Japanese idol girl group AKB48. (Note: also known as 冲吧少女组合 (Chong Ba Shaonu Zuhe)) It was established in 2018 after the dissolution of AKB48's relationship with the girl group SNH48 back in 2016. The group is short for Team Shanghai 48, a re arrangement of the group's former name.

== History ==
On April 10, 2018, the application process was opened for the formation of Team SH, in which 38,066 girls registered by May. The applications were reviewed, and the second round consisted of interviews that were held in six cities. A third round was conducted in Shanghai, of which 62 girls were finalists and performed in singing and dancing. On July 25, it was announced that 34 members have been selected for the first generation of Team SH. Two of the members, Liu Nian and Mao WeiJia had previously participated in the idol competition show Produce 101.
In 2025, the group's licensing company, Superball, announced that the group would adopt a new name starting in 2026. Later, the new group name was revealed as TSH48.

== Members ==
Initially, in 2018, they announced 21 people as the first-generation members.
As of today, they have 21 active members, consisting of 15 official members and 6 trainees.

=== Official members ===
Name	Date of birth (age)	Generation	Place of birth	Election Rank	Notes
Name	Date of birth (age)	Generation	Place of birth	1	Notes
Dong Fangchi (董芳池)	October 8, 2002 (age 23)	1st Generation	Jilin	N/A	
Gong Luwen (龚露雯)	March 16, 2001 (age 25)	2nd Generation	Hubei	N/A	
Gui Chuchu (桂楚楚)	March 10, 1999 (age 27)	2nd Generation	Hunan	9	
Jian Qiangwei (渐蔷薇)	November 21, 1997 (age 28)	2nd Generation	Shandong	14	
Kong Kexin (孔珂昕)	October 17, 1997 (age 28)	2nd Generation	Shandong	15	
Li Shiqi (李诗绮)	October 26, 1999 (age 26)	1st Generation	Guizhou	N/A	All activities are being stopped on the 02 of Jan,2020
Liang Shi'an (梁时安)	April 2, 1998 (age 28)	2nd Generation	Beijing	11	
Mao Weijia (毛唯嘉)	March 16, 1995 (age 31)	AKB48 China Audition; 1st Generation	Shanghai	8	
Qiu Di'er (邱笛尔)	January 27, 2000 (age 26)	3rd Generation	Zhejiang	N/A	
Shen Ying (沈莹)	March 2, 2000 (age 26)	1st Generation	Shanghai	7	
Shi Aibei (施蔼倍)	September 15, 2000 (age 26)	2nd Generation	Sichuan	N/A	
Shi Keyan (施可妍)	July 30, 2001 (age 25)	1st Generation	Jiangsu	20	
Song Xinran (宋欣然)	January 22, 1998 (age 28)	1st Generation	Jiangsu	N/A	
Tan Junxi (谭珺兮)	May 19, 1998 (age 28)	2nd Generation	Sichuan	16	
Wan Fangzhou (万芳舟)	July 20, 1998 (age 28)	1st Generation	Jiangxi	17	All activities are being stopped on the 14 of May,2021
Wang Anni (王安妮)	February 19, 2000 (age 26)	3nd Generation	Zhejiang	N/A	
Wei Xin (魏新)	September 5, 1998 (age 28)	1st Generation	Chongqing	N/A	
Wu Anqi (吴安琪)	April 3, 2002 (age 24)	1st Generation	Zhejiang	4	
Xie Wenjie (谢雯婕)	January 8, 2001 (age 25)	3rd Generation	Fujian	N/A	
Xiong Fangni (熊芳妮)	August 15	2nd Generation	Zhejiang	N/A	All activities are being stopped on 6 July 2020
Ye Zhi'en (叶知恩)	October 13, 1999 (age 26)	1st Generation	Guangdong	6	
Yuan Ruixi (袁瑞希)	July 17, 1996 (age 30)	1st Generation	Guangdong	N/A	
Zhai Yujia (翟羽佳)	September 29, 1996 (age 29)	1st Generation	Tianjin	N/A	
Zhang Qianfei (张倩霏)	July 25, 1998 (age 28)	2nd Generation	Hebei	13	
Ziang Qiaoyu (张乔瑜)	June 5, 1998 (age 28)	2nd Generation	Shandong	12	All activities are being suspended on 11 January 2022
Zeng Sichun (曾鸶淳)	September 11, 1998 (age 28)	2nd Generation	Sichuan	1	
Zhou Nianqi (周念琪)	August 24, 2002 (age 24)	1st Generation	Jiangxi	18	
Zhu Ling (朱苓)	October 18, 2001 (age 24)	1st Generation	Sichuan	3	
Zhuang Xiaoti (庄晓媞)	December 6, 1998 (age 27)	1st Generation	Sichuan	N/A	
Zou Ruonan (邹若男)	April 23, 1998 (age 28)	2nd Generation	Jiangsu	5	

=== Trainees ===
Name	Date of birth (age)	Generation	Place of birth	Election Rank	Notes
Name	Date of birth (age)	Generation	Place of birth	1	Notes
Chen Jiayi (陈嘉意)	May 23, 1996 (age 30)	4th Generation	Guangxi		
Cheng Anzi (程安子)	March 12, 2002 (age 24)	2nd Generation	Hubei	19	
Li Jiahui (李佳慧)	December 11, 2000 (age 25)	3rd Generation	Shanghai	N/A	
Li Yumiao (李于淼)	July 11, 2001 (age 25)	2nd Generation	Shanghai	N/A	All activities are being stopped on 17 March 2021
Liu Nian (刘念)	February 2, 2001 (age 25)	AKB48 China Audition; 1st Generation	Henan	2	All activities are being stopped on 11 January 2022
Ma Xiaoyu (马小雨)	June 12, 2002 (age 24)	3rd Generation	Jiangsu	N/A	
Peng Luxuan (彭露萱)	August 1, 2000 (age 26)	3rd Generation	Jiangsu	N/A	
Pu Zhiying (蒲祉颖)	July 28, 1999 (age 27)	2nd Generation	Sichuan	N/A	
Wang Xiaoyang (王晓阳)	May 14, 2000 (age 26)	4th Generation	Beijing		
Wang Xuanya (王暄雅)	July 9, 2006 (age 20)	3rd Generation	Taiwan	N/A	
Wu Fan (吴凡)	June 26, 2004 (age 22)	4th Generation	Shanghai		
Wu Yiting (吴怡婷)	November 19, 1999 (age 26)	2nd Generation	Zhejiang	21	
Xu Yiting (徐依婷)	September 17, 1999 (age 27)	1st Generation	Shanghai	N/A	
Zeng Yi (曾艺)	September 14, 1997 (age 29)	4th Generation	Sichuan		
Zhang Jiazhe (张嘉哲)	March 8, 1998 (age 28)	3rd Generation	Jiangsu	N/A	
Zhang Yilin (张艺琳)	September 12, 2005 (age 21)	4th Generation	Beijing		
Zhang Yinglu (张樱璐)	January 2, 1999 (age 27)	2nd Generation	Anhui	N/A	
Zhou-Chen Yuxuan (周陈雨轩)	July 26, 2002 (age 24)	3rd Generation	Fujian	N/A	
Zhu Jingchen (朱景晨)	October 31, 1998 (age 27)	4th Generation	Zhejiang		

=== Former members ===
Name	Notes
Liu Hui	Left on December 27, 2018
Liu Yihan	Left on December 27, 2018
Liu Liu	Graduated on November 4, 2019
Risa	Left on April 2, 2020
Chen Yixin	Graduated on July 31, 2020
Guan Tiantian	Graduated on July 31, 2020
Dai Ziyan	Graduated on September 8, 2020
Chen-Zhang Yuan	Dismissed on October 5, 2020
Wang Yuduo	Left on July 12, 2022
Wang Yuran	Left on February 22, 2023
Pan Qiuyi	Dismissed on May 17, 2023
Hu Xinyin	Graduated on October 28, 2023

== Discography ==
=== Single ===
#	Released date	Title	Version	Recorded tracks
1st	January 14, 2019	"ChuRi" 《初日》	Type-A（CD） Type-B（CD+DVD）	CD: 1. 初日 （AKB48 "Shonichi" Chinese Version）; 2. 爱的旅程 （AKB48 "Love Trip" Chinese Version）; 3. 闪亮的幸运 （AKB48 "Heavy Rotation" Chinese Version）; 4. 初日 (off vocal ver.); 5. 爱的旅程 (off vocal ver.); 6. 闪亮的幸运 (off vocal ver.); DVD: 1. 爱的旅程 MV
2nd	May 24, 2019	"So Long!" 《So long!》	Regular Version（CD）	1. So long! （AKB48 "So long!" Chinese Version）; 2. 关于你 （AKB48 "Kimi ni Tsuite" Chinese Version）; 3. So long!（off vocal ver.）; 4. 关于你（off vocal ver.）
3rd	July 29, 2019	"Chong Ba! ShaoNuMen" 《冲吧！少女们》	Regular Version（CD） Collector Version（CD+DVD）	CD: 1. 冲吧！少女们 （AKB48 "Shōjotachi yo" Chinese Version）; 2. 试着思考爱的意义 （AKB48 "Ai no Imi o Kangaete Mita" Chinese Version）; 3. Baby! Baby! Baby! （AKB48 "Baby! Baby! Baby!" Chinese Version）; 4. NO WAY MAN （AKB48 "No Way Man" Chinese Version）; 5. 冲吧！少女们（off vocal ver.）; 6. 试着思考爱的意义（off vocal ver.）; 7. Baby! Baby! Baby!（off vocal ver.）; 8. NO WAY MAN（off vocal ver.）; DVD: 1. 冲吧！少女们 MV
4th	September 14, 2020	"Ying Xiang WeiLai De Feng" 《迎向未来的风》	Limit Version（CD） Regular Version（CD+DVD）	CD: 1. 迎向未来的风 （AKB48 "Kaze wa Fuite Iru" Chinese Version）; 2. 为何银河如此明亮 （SKE48 "Nante Ginga wa Arui no Darou" Chinese Version）; 3. 糖果 （AKB48 "Candy" Chinese Version）; 4. 迎向未来的风（off vocal ver.）; 5. 为何银河如此明亮（off vocal ver.）; 6. 糖果（off vocal ver.）; DVD: 1. 迎向未来的风 MV; 2. 迎向未来的风 MV Making
5th	April 8, 2021	"JieKou ErYi Maybe" 《借口而已Maybe》	A Version（CD） B Version（CD+DVD）	CD: 1. 借口而已Maybe （AKB48 "Iiwake Maybe" Chinese Version）; 2. 唯独你渐染秋意 （AKB48 "Kimi dake ga Akimeiteita" Chinese Version）; 3. Blue rose （AKB48 "Blue rose" Chinese Version）; 4. 借口而已Maybe（off vocal ver.）; 5. 唯独你渐染秋意（off vocal ver.）; 6. Blue rose（off vocal ver.）; DVD: 1. 借口而已Maybe MV; 2. 借口而已Maybe MV Making
6th	September 30, 2021	"QianQiu Ling" 《千秋令》	Regular Version（CD+DVD）	CD: 1. 千秋令（original song）; 2. RIVER （AKB48 "River" Chinese Version）; 3. 千秋令（off vocal ver.）; 4. RIVER（off vocal ver.）; DVD: 1. 千秋令 MV; 2. 千秋令 MV Making
7th	April 1, 2022	"Da Sheng ZuanShi" 《大声钻石》	Regular Version（CD） Collector Version（CD+DVD）	CD: 1. 大声钻石 （AKB48 "Ōgoe Diamond" Chinese Version）; 2. 机会的顺序 （AKB48 "Chance no Junban" Chinese Version）; 3. 拥有你! （AKB48 "Get you!" Chinese Version）; 4. 昔日的运动鞋 （AKB48 "Anogoro no sunika" Chinese Version）; 5. 大声钻石（off vocal ver.）; 6. 机会的顺序（off vocal ver.）; 7. 拥有你!（off vocal ver.）; 8. 昔日的运动鞋（off vocal ver.）; DVD: 1. 大声钻石 MV; 2. 大声钻石 MV Making

== See also ==
- TPE48
- MNL48
- SGO48
- BNK48
- JKT48
- AKB48
