= TPE48 =

Taiwanese idol group

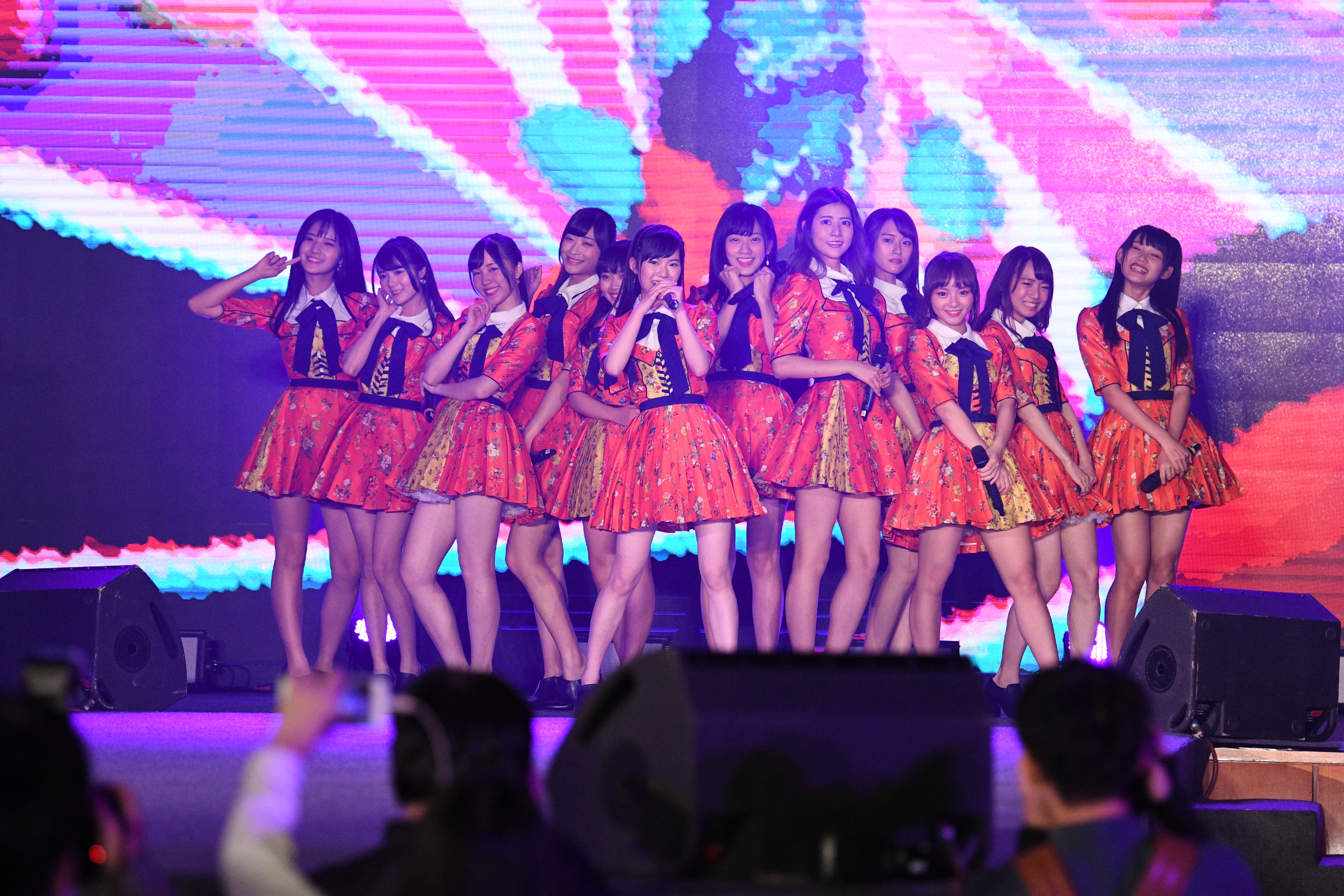
- TPE48 (Then: AKB48 Team TP) performed at the Cool Japan Fest 2018 on December 8, 2018.

Background information
- Origin: Taipei, Taiwan
- Genres: Pop; J-pop; Mandopop
- Years active: 2018–present
- Labels: Muses & Nymph Entertainment, Good Talk Media
- Member of: AKB48 Group
- Members: List of members
- Past members: List of former members
- Website: www.tpe48.tw

TPE48, formerly known as AKB48 Team TP, is a Taiwanese idol group and the sixth international sister group of AKB48, after Indonesia's JKT48, China's SNH48 (former), Thailand's BNK48, Philippines's MNL48, and China's TSH48. The group is named after Taipei, the capital city of Taiwan.

== History ==
=== 2011–2012: Creation ===
AKB48 Team TP Logo

On October 10, 2011, AKB48 announced the creation of TPE48, and will build the theater next year summer. At that time, AKS cooperated with Yoshimoto Kogyo and expected to start audition work in 2012. However, the two sides failed to reach a consensus in the preparation work, and thus they were discontinued after the second half of 2012.

=== 2014–2015: AKB48 Taiwan Audition ===
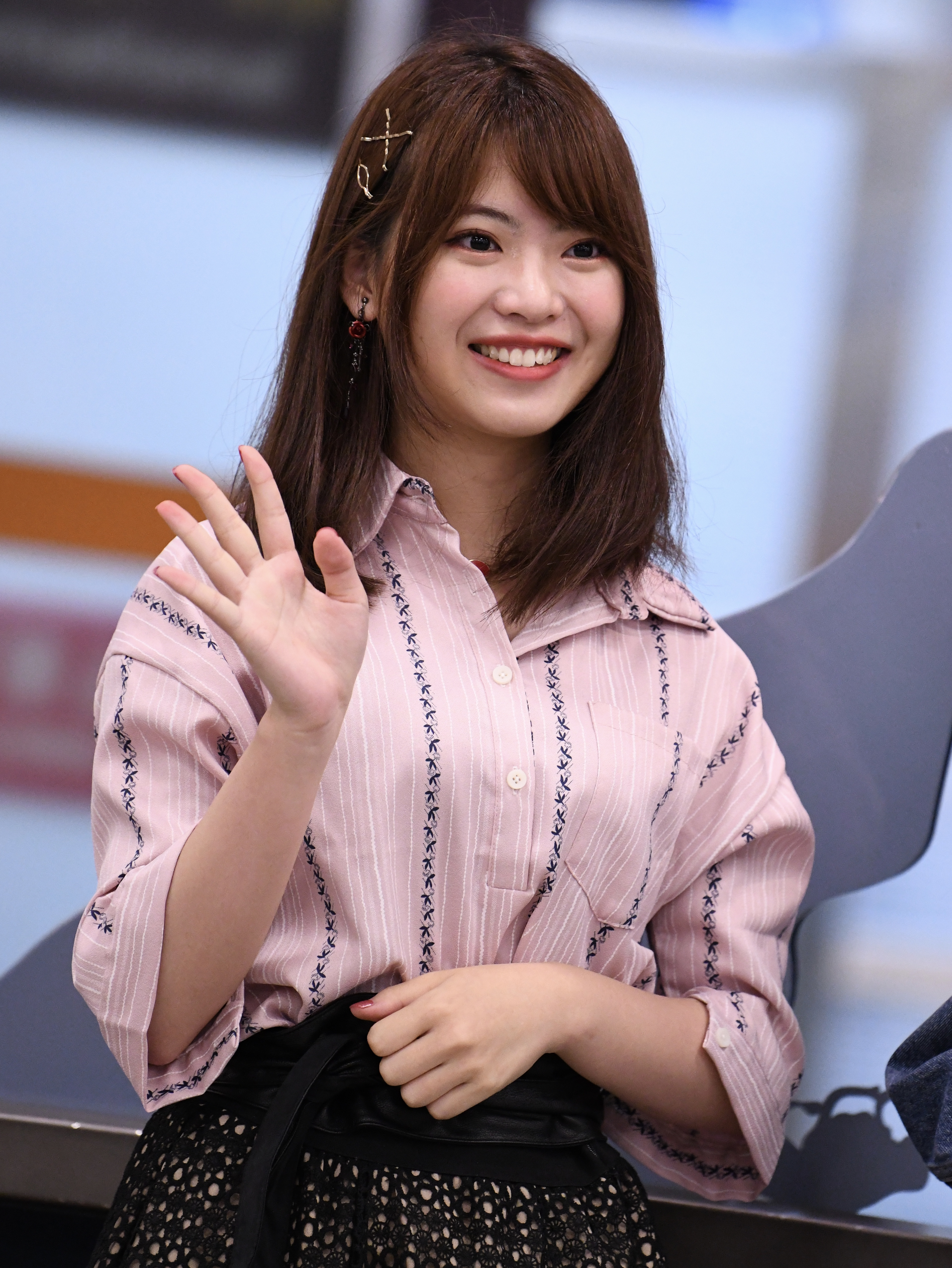
Ma Chia-ling

On December 7, 2014, during HKT48's Taipei concert, AKB48 announced that they will hold an audition for members of the AKB48 in Taiwan someday, but it was unclear whether the audition is related to TPE48. Subsequently, AKB48 officially announced its will hold the "AKB48 Taiwan Audition" on April 1, 2015, which is the first AKB48 audition event held besides Japan. From 2,152 who auditioned, 17 were chosen as member of the "AKB48 Taiwan Kenkyusei" (AKB48台灣研究生) to have completed the audition on August 17, 2015.

Ma Chia-ling was passed the audition and debuted in December 2015 in AKB48 Kouhaku Utagassen (AKB48紅白対抗歌合戦). February 21, 2016, she promoted as the "Taiwan Ryugakusei" (台灣留學生) to AKB48 Team B, and becomes first foreign member of AKB48 and the fastest AKB48 member to be promoted.

=== 2016–2017: Resume ===
March 26, 2016, the creation of TPE48, BNK48 and MNL48 was announced at the Takahashi Minami's concert.

Later on July 9, 2017, AKB48 announced specially will hold audition for 1st generation members of TPE48 in September during the Kizaki Yuria, Yokoyama Yui and Shimada Haruka's event "AKB48 Fan Meeting in TAIWAN". September 1, TPE48 runs audition and all members of AKB48 Taiwan Kenkyusei were become the seed members in audition. The same day, Abe Maria, a member of AKB48 Team K, says will transfer form AKB48 to TPE48. In the end, on November 30, 2017, Abe Maria performed the final performance at AKB48 Theater and officially transferred to TPE48 next day.

=== 2018–present ===
February 4, 2018, 72 girls were selected for the final round, next 45 girls were revealed for 1st generation members. But at the end, only 40 girls were formally joined into the group, 13 of whom were official members and 27 were trainees. In 2019, their TTP Festival and 看見夕陽了嗎？(Kan chien hsi yang le ma) rank No.1 and No.4 in Guangnan 2019 yearly chart and No.6 and No.11 in Fivemusic yearly chart.

==== Financial crisis and group restructure ====
On June 16, 2018, TPE48 Entertainment (熙曜娛樂), TPE48's management company, suffered a financial crisis, members and staff didn't get paid about 3 months ago. On July 30, 2018, AKS had canceled a joint venture and license agreement with TPE48 Entertainment and created AKB48 Team TP. In January 2026, it was announced that the group would return to its original name, TPE48.

== Members ==
- Unit T and Unit P were debuted on January 15, 2023, after Unit Daisy, Unit Bellflower and Unit Sakura disbanded.
- The full name of two units Unit TIC TAC TOE and Unit Peek A Boo were announced on February 18, 2023.
- Team TIII and Team P will debut on August 1, 2026, after Unit TIC TAC TOE and Unit Peek A Boo disband.
- Member list as of August 25, 2026:

=== Unit TIC TAC TOE ===
- The unit color is blue (R=60, G=168, B=201)
- The captain is Lau Hiu-ching

Official members／Trainees	Name	Date of birth (age)	Place of birth	Generation	Date of promotion	Notes	Former Unit
Official members	Lau Hiu-ching (劉曉晴)	August 2, 2000 (age 26)	Hong Kong	1st	June 15, 2019	Unit TIC TAC TOE Captain; Former Unit Sakura Captain; Oldest Member; Announced graduation on June 28, 2026	Sakura → Peek A Boo
Official members	Lin Yu-hsin (林于馨)	January 14, 2002 (age 24)	Yilan County	1st	June 15, 2019	Former AKB48 Taiwan Kenkyusei (Dropout during the debut)	Sakura
Official members	Huang Yi-lin (黃奕霖)	April 24, 2002 (age 24)		3rd	April 5, 2026		
Official members	Meng Ting-yun (孟庭筠)	November 28, 2002 (age 23)		4th	April 3, 2026		
Official members	Yi Pin (伊品)	April 26, 2003 (age 23)		4th	May 24, 2025		
Official members	Chang Shao-tong (張少瞳)	February 28, 2008 (age 18)		3rd	May 24, 2025		
Trainees	Chen Zhao-Ni (陳昭霓)	September 6, 2005 (age 21)		4th			
Trainees	Tang Ching (唐靜)	March 29, 2002 (age 24)		5th			
Trainees	Lin Wei-ting (林瑋庭)	October 19, 2002 (age 23)		5th		Currently on hiatus since December 22, 2025	
Trainees	Chen Tai-ling (陳泰琌)	June 22, 2004 (age 22)		5th			
Trainees	Chen Jia-yi (陳嘉儀)	December 25, 2004 (age 21)		5th			
Trainees	Yang Ya-yun (楊亞芸)	April 7, 2007 (age 19)		5th			

=== Unit Peek A Boo ===
- The unit color is red (R=220, G=72, B=58)
- The captain is Tsai Ya-en

Official members／Trainees	Name	Date of birth (age)	Place of birth	Generation	Date of promotion	Notes	Former Unit
Official members	Lin Yi-yun (林易沄)	November 21, 2000 (age 25)	New Taipei	1st	January 22, 2022	TPE48 Captain	Sakura → TIC TAC TOE
Official members	Tsai Ya-en (蔡亞恩)	October 21, 2000 (age 25)	Keelung City	1st	January 19, 2020	Unit Peek A Boo Captain	Daisy → TIC TAC TOE
Official members	Chang Yu-ling (張羽翎)	July 11, 2003 (age 23)	Hualien County	AKB48 Taiwan Audition			Sakura
Official members	Chen Ying-zhen (陳穎臻)	January 2, 2004 (age 22)		4th	December 19, 2025		
Trainees	Huang Yu-yan (黃昱燕)	June 8, 2006 (age 20)	Keelung City	3rd			
Trainees	Su Heng-yu (蘇姮羽)	December 26, 2010 (age 15)	New Taipei City	3rd			
Trainees	Chen Yi-ling (陳以凌)	October 19, 2005 (age 20)		4th			
Trainees	Tsai Chiao-yin (蔡喬茵)	May 13, 2005 (age 21)		5th			
Trainees	Chen Chiao-yi (陳巧儀)	July 31, 2005 (age 21)		5th			
Trainees	Liu Zi-fei (劉子菲)	May 4, 2009 (age 17)		5th			

=== 6th generation trainees ===
Official members／Trainees	Name	Date of birth (age)	Place of birth	Generation	Notes
Trainees	Lin Yun-Hsi (林昀希)	April 18, 2003 (age 23)		6th	
Trainees	Hu Yung-Ching (胡詠晴)	April 21, 2003 (age 23)		6th	
Trainees	Yang Chia-Yi (楊家宜)	January 1, 2004 (age 22)		6th	
Trainees	Xu Chun-Yuan (許淳媛)	March 16, 2004 (age 22)		6th	
Trainees	Yu Zi-Lei (郁子蕾)	June 21, 2008 (age 18)		6th	
Trainees	Chang Hsin-Chiao (張鈊喬)	November 23, 2008 (age 17)		6th	
Trainees	Lu Hsin-En (呂昕恩)	January 1, 2011 (age 15)		6th	Currently on hiatus since January 1, 2026 due to academic purposes
Trainees	Liu Yan-Ning (劉曣甯)	December 16, 2011 (age 14)		6th	Youngest member

=== Former members ===
Unit	Official members／Trainees	Name	Date of birth (age)	Place of birth	Generation	Notes
TPE48
	Trainees	Chang Ching (張競)	June 5, 2002 (age 24)	Taipei	1st	Left in March 2018, Girls Planet 999's former contestant, ILY:1 Member
	Trainees	Chan Ka-hei (陳嘉希)	March 9, 1999 (age 27)	Hong Kong	1st	Left in March 2018
	Trainees	Chen Wei (陳暐)	January 3, 2000 (age 26)	Taichung	1st	Left in March 2018
	Trainees	Huang Tzu-ching (黃子晴)	March 31, 2000 (age 26)	Kaohsiung	1st	Left in March 2018
	Trainees	Lee En-yun (李恩妘)	August 3, 2000 (age 26)	Taipei	1st	Left in March 2018
	Trainees	Wen Chen-chun (溫晨君)	August 28, 1997 (age 29)	Taipei	1st	Left in March 2018
	Official members	Chen Shih-yuan (陳詩媛)	April 24, 1995 (age 31)	Taipei	AKB48 Taiwan Audition	Left in August 2018 before the AKB48 Team TP debuted Twin sister of Chen Shih-ya; Former 5TEAM and Rakuten Girls member
	Trainees	Lee Chen-si (李晨熙)	July 25, 2000 (age 26)	Tainan	1st	Left in August 2018 before the AKB48 Team TP debuted
	Trainees	Wen Li-fei (翁立霏)	February 11, 2000 (age 26)	Taipei	1st	Left in August 2018 before the AKB48 Team TP debuted
	Trainees	Chen Lin (陳琳)	January 3, 2006 (age 20)	Taipei	1st	Left in August 2018 before the AKB48 Team TP debuted
	Trainees	Liu Yen-ting (劉姸廷)	October 13, 2003 (age 22)	Taipei	1st	Left in August 2018 before the AKB48 Team TP debuted
AKB48 Team TP
	Official members	Maria Abe (阿部瑪利亞)	November 29, 1995 (age 30)	Kanagawa Prefecture, Japan	AKB48 10th	Graduated from AKB48 and AKB48 Team TP on AKB48 in Taipei 2019 event: "Are You Ready For It?"
Bellflower	Official members	Liu Jie-ming (劉潔明)	April 19, 1997 (age 29)	Taipei	1st	On hiatus since January 30, 2020 until the personal profile on the official website had been deleted on September 10, 2020
Sakura	Official members	Honda Yuzuka (本田柚萱)	March 15, 2006 (age 20)	Hsinchu City	1st	Graduated from AKB48 Team TP on March 25, 2021, due to poor health condition
Sakura	Official members	Tseng Shih-yu (曾詩羽)	February 12, 1995 (age 31)	Yunlin County	1st	Left from AKB48 Team TP on November 9, 2021, due to poor health condition
Sakura	Trainees	Lin Chia-ying (林家瑩)	December 4, 2000 (age 25)	New Taipei	1st	Left from AKB48 Team TP on November 9, 2021, due to poor health condition
Daisy	Official members	Chen Shih-ya (陳詩雅)	April 24, 1995 (age 31)	Taipei	AKB48 Taiwan Audition	Graduated from AKB48 Team TP on August 28, 2022; Former AKB48 Team TP Captain; Former Unit Daisy Captain; Twin sister of Chen Shih-yuan; Joined Muse Girls on September 5, 2023; Joined Dragon Beauties on September 10, 2023
TIC TAC TOE	Official members	Po Ling (柏靈)	September 13, 1999 (age 27)	Taipei	1st	On hiatus since April 1, 2023, due to academic purposes until left from AKB48 Team TP on April 21, 2023。
Peek A Boo	Trainees	Lin Jia-ni (林佳霓)	January 16, 2005 (age 21)	New Taipei	2nd	On hiatus since October 2, 2022, due for rule violations until left from AKB48 Team TP on May 17, 2023
TIC TAC TOE	Official members	Fujii Mayu (藤井麻由)	November 30, 1998 (age 27)	Osaka Prefecture, Japan	1st	Left from AKB48 Team TP on June 7, 2023, due for rule violations
TIC TAC TOE	Official members	Lin Chieh (林倢)	February 14, 2001 (age 25)	Hsinchu County	AKB48 Taiwan Audition	Graduated from AKB48 Team TP on August 20, 2023; Joined Luxy Girls on November 9, 2023
TIC TAC TOE	Official members	Zhou Jia-yu (周佳郁)	November 19, 1997 (age 28)	Taipei	1st	Graduated from AKB48 Team TP on August 20, 2023; The final activity date was September 17, 2023
TIC TAC TOE	Official members	Gao Yun-jue (高云珏)	October 20, 2001 (age 24)	Taichung	1st	Graduated from AKB48 Team TP on August 20, 2023; The final activity date was September 17, 2023
TIC TAC TOE	Official members	Chang Fa-fa (張法法)	December 27, 2001 (age 24)	Taipei City	1st	Graduated from AKB48 Team TP on August 20, 2023; The final activity date was September 17, 2023
TIC TAC TOE	Official members	Oyama Mirei (小山美玲)	June 28, 2002 (age 24)	Fukuoka Prefecture, Japan	1st	Graduated from AKB48 Team TP on August 20, 2023; The final activity date was September 17, 2023
TIC TAC TOE	Official members	Lin Chieh-hsin (林潔心)	March 27, 2003 (age 23)	New Taipei	1st	Graduated from AKB48 Team TP on August 20, 2023; The final activity date was September 17, 2023
TIC TAC TOE	Official members	Lo Jui-ting (羅瑞婷)	August 6, 2004 (age 22)	Taipei	1st	Graduated from AKB48 Team TP on August 20, 2023; The final activity date was September 17, 2023; Former Honeys member
Peek A Boo	Official members	Chiu Pin-han (邱品涵)	December 24, 1999 (age 26)	New Taipei City	AKB48 Taiwan Audition	Graduated from AKB48 Team TP on August 20, 2023; The final activity date was September 17, 2023; Joined Taishin Wonders on September 2, 2025; Former Honeys member
Peek A Boo	Official members	Wang Yi-chia (王逸嘉)	November 18, 2001 (age 24)	Chiayi City	1st	Graduated from AKB48 Team TP on August 20, 2023; The final activity date was September 17, 2023; Former Unit Peek A Boo Captain
Peek A Boo	Official members	Lee Meng-chun (李孟純)	June 4, 2002 (age 24)	Pingtung County	1st	Graduated from AKB48 Team TP on August 20, 2023; The final activity date was September 17, 2023
Peek A Boo	Official members	Cheng Yu-wei (鄭妤葳)	November 11, 2003 (age 22)	Tainan	1st	Graduated from AKB48 Team TP on August 20, 2023; The final activity date was September 17, 2023
Peek A Boo	Official members	Cheng Chia-yu (鄭佳郁)	April 28, 2004 (age 22)	Taipei	1st	Graduated from AKB48 Team TP on August 20, 2023; The final activity date was September 17, 2023
Peek A Boo	Official members	Kao Yen-chen (高硯晨)	July 16, 2006 (age 20)	New Taipei	1st	Graduated from AKB48 Team TP on August 20, 2023; The final activity date was September 17, 2023
TIC TAC TOE	Official members	Liu Yu-ching (劉語晴)	July 14, 1996 (age 30)	Taoyuan	1st	Graduated from AKB48 Team TP on August 20, 2023; The final activity date was October 6, 2023; Former AKB48 Team TP Captain; Former Unit TIC TAC TOE Captain; Former Unit Bellflower Captain
Peek A Boo	Official members	Sin Tik-kei (冼迪琦)	February 13, 1999 (age 27)	Hong Kong	1st	Graduated from AKB48 Team TP on August 20, 2023; The final activity date was October 6, 2023; Joined Passion Sisters on September 9, 2023
Peek A Boo	Official members	Li Cai-jie (李采潔)	March 15, 2004 (age 22)	Taipei	1st	Graduated from AKB48 Team TP on August 20, 2023; The final activity date was October 6, 2023; Younger sister of Li Jia-li
Peek A Boo	Official members	Li Jia-li (李佳俐)	November 5, 2001 (age 24)	Taipei	1st	Graduated from AKB48 Team TP on August 20, 2023; The final activity date was October 29, 2023; Older sister of Li Cai-jie; Joined Fubon Angels on November 6, 2023
TIC TAC TOE	Trainees	Chia I-chen (賈宜蓁)	August 18, 1999 (age 27)	Hsinchu City	1st	Left from AKB48 Team TP on October 14, 2023
TIC TAC TOE	Official members	Kuo Shin-yu (國興瑀)	October 11, 2002 (age 23)	Taipei	AKB48 Taiwan Audition	Graduated from AKB48 Team TP on October 19, 2024; The final activity date was October 27, 2024
TIC TAC TOE	Official members	Yuan Tzu-chu (袁子筑)	May 7, 1999 (age 27)	New Taipei	2nd	Joined Muse Girls on September 5, 2023; Graduated from AKB48 Team TP on December 22, 2024
Peek A Boo	Official members	Lin Ting-li (林亭莉)	June 1, 1999 (age 27)	Taoyuan	2nd	Graduated from AKB48 Team TP on December 22, 2024; The final activity date was April 26, 2025
Peek A Boo	Official members	Wu Wan-ling (吳婉淩)	August 10, 2004 (age 22)	Taipei	2nd	Graduated from AKB48 Team TP on December 22, 2024; The final activity date was April 26, 2025
TIC TAC TOE	Official members	Weng Tung-hsun (翁彤薰)	May 19, 1997 (age 29)	Taipei	2nd	Graduated from AKB48 Team TP on March 23, 2025
TIC TAC TOE	Official members	Wu Chi-hui (吳騏卉)	October 25, 1998 (age 27)	Taipei	2nd	Graduated from AKB48 Team TP on March 23, 2025; The final activity date was April 26, 2025
Peek A Boo	Official members	Miyata Ruka (宮田留佳)	April 22, 1996 (age 30)	Yamanashi Prefecture, Japan	2nd	Graduated from AKB48 Team TP on March 23, 2025; The final activity date was April 27, 2025
Peek A Boo	Official members	Chou Chia-an (周家安)	October 9, 2003 (age 22)	Taichung	2nd	Graduated from AKB48 Team TP on March 23, 2025; The final activity date was April 27, 2025
Peek A Boo	Official members	Tung Zih-syuan (董子瑄)	December 4, 2003 (age 22)	Taipei	1st	Graduated from AKB48 Team TP on May 25, 2025
TIC TAC TOE	Trainees	Li Pei-yi (李佩宜)	July 6, 2010 (age 16)		5th	Left from AKB48 Team TP on June 30, 2025, due to poor health condition
TIC TAC TOE	Official members	Pan Tzu-yi (潘姿怡)	July 28, 1996 (age 30)	Taipei	1st	Graduated from AKB48 Team TP on August 24, 2025
Peek A Boo	Trainees	Fan Chiang Yu-en (范姜又恩)	March 20, 2003 (age 23)		4th	Left from AKB48 Team TP on December 9, 2025, due for rule violations
Peek A Boo	Trainees	Yu Yan-ci (余嬿慈)	February 25, 2006 (age 20)		5th	On hiatus since May 30, 2025 until left from AKB48 Team TP on January 5, 2026, due for rule violations
Peek A Boo	Trainees	Hsu Pei-wan (徐沛婠)	January 23, 2006 (age 20)		4th	Left from TPE48 on May 25, 2026, due to poor health condition
Peek A Boo	Official members	Tsai Yi-jou (蔡伊柔)	July 15, 2001 (age 25)	New Taipei	1st	Graduated from TPE48 on July 19, 2026
TIC TAC TOE	Trainees	Wong Mann-ling (翁曼綾)	December 23, 2006 (age 19)		4th	On hiatus since July 1, 2024 due to academic purposes until left from TPE48 on August 8, 2026
TIC TAC TOE	Trainees	Chiu Yi-ching (邱宜靚)	October 23, 2005 (age 20)		5th	On hiatus since January 1, 2026 due to academic purposes until left from TPE48 on August 8, 2026
Peek A Boo	Trainees	Peng Yu-ting (彭鈺婷)	September 24, 2004 (age 21)		5th	On hiatus since February 14, 2026 due to poor health condition until left from TPE48 on August 8, 2026

=== Captain history ===
Overall team captain

1st	2nd	3rd
Chen Shih-ya （August 26, 2018－June 30, 2022）	Liu Yu-ching （July 1, 2022－July 30, 2023）	Lin Yi-yun （August 1, 2023－）

Unit captain

Unit Daisy	Unit Bellflower	Unit Sakura
Chen Shih-ya （December 21, 2019－August 28, 2022）	Liu Yu-ching （December 21, 2019－January 14, 2023）	Lau Hiu-ching （December 21, 2019－January 14, 2023）

	Unit TIC TAC TOE	Unit Peek A Boo
1st	Liu Yu-ching （January 15, 2023－August 20, 2023）	Wang Yi-chia （January 15, 2023－August 20, 2023）
2nd	Lau Hiu-ching （August 21, 2023－July 31, 2026）	Tsai Ya-en （August 21, 2023－July 31, 2026）

Team captain

	Team TIII	Team P
1st	Chang Shao-tong （August 1, 2026－）	Meng Ting-yun （August 1, 2026－）

== Discography ==
=== Singles ===
No.	Year	Title	Details
1	2018	Mae shika Mukanee (勇往直前)	Released date: December 25, 2018; Label: Universal Music Taiwan
1	2018	Sakura no Hanabiratachi (櫻花瓣)	Released date: December 25, 2018; Label: Universal Music Taiwan
2	2019	Sougen no Kiseki (綠草地上的奇蹟)	Released date: April 15, 2019; Label: Universal Music Taiwan
2	2019	TTP Festival	Released date: July 26, 2019; Label: Universal Music Taiwan
2	2019	LOVE Shugyou (LOVE修行)	Released date: July 26, 2019; Label: Universal Music Taiwan
3	2019	Yūhi o Miteiru ka? (看見夕陽了嗎？)	Released date: December 25, 2019; Label: Universal Music Taiwan
3	2019	Only Today	Released date: December 25, 2019; Label: Universal Music Taiwan
3	2019	Heart gata Virus (心型病毒)	Released date: December 25, 2019; Label: Universal Music Taiwan
4	2020	UHHO UHHOHO (嗚吼嗚吼吼)	Released date: September 17, 2020; Label: Universal Music Taiwan
4	2020	Hashire! Penguin (奔跑吧！企鵝)	Released date: September 17, 2020; Label: Universal Music Taiwan
4	2020	Hello CENTER (哈囉CENTER)	Released date: September 17, 2020; Label: Universal Music Taiwan
5	2021	Ticktock Promise (一秒一秒約好)	Released date: October 15, 2021; Label: Universal Music Taiwan
5	2021	Mirai no Kajitsu (未來的果實)	Released date: October 15, 2021; Label: Universal Music Taiwan
5	2021	Chance no Junban (機會的順序)	Released date: October 15, 2021; Label: Universal Music Taiwan
6	2022	Nemohamo Rumor (無根無據Rumor)	Released date: October 14, 2022; Label: Sony Music Taiwan
6	2022	Kimi no Koto ga Suki Dakara (因為喜歡你)	Released date: October 14, 2022; Label: Sony Music Taiwan
6	2022	Yume no Kawa (夢之河)	Released date: October 14, 2022; Label: Sony Music Taiwan
7	2023	11gatsu no Anklet (11月的腳鍊)	Released date: July 21, 2023; Label: Sony Music Taiwan
7	2023	Yume e no Route (夢之路)	Released date: July 21, 2023; Label: Sony Music Taiwan
7	2023	Go Now	Released date: July 21, 2023; Label: Sony Music Taiwan
8	2024	24/7 Shining	Released date: August 20, 2024; Label: Sony Music Taiwan
8	2024	Jiushi Hao Xihuan (就是好喜歡)	Released date: August 20, 2024; Label: Sony Music Taiwan
9	2025	Team UP	Released date: February 14, 2025; Label: Sony Music Taiwan
9	2025	Qiji Shunjian (奇蹟瞬間)	Released date: February 14, 2025; Label: Sony Music Taiwan
9	2025	Weixiao ED (微笑ED)	Released date: February 14, 2025; Label: Sony Music Taiwan
10	2025	Ni Hui Deng Wo Ma? / Oh my pumpkin! (你會等我嗎？ / Oh my pumpkin!)	Released date: August 29, 2025; Label: Sony Music Taiwan

== Filmography ==
=== Television and radio shows ===
- Team TP Youth Weekly (Team TP 青春週記) (KKBox, March 14, 2019 – present)

=== Commercials and endorsements ===
- Aikatsu! (Sega Amusements Taiwan, 2018–present)
- Breeze Nan Shan (Breeze Center, 2019)
