= AKB48 discography =

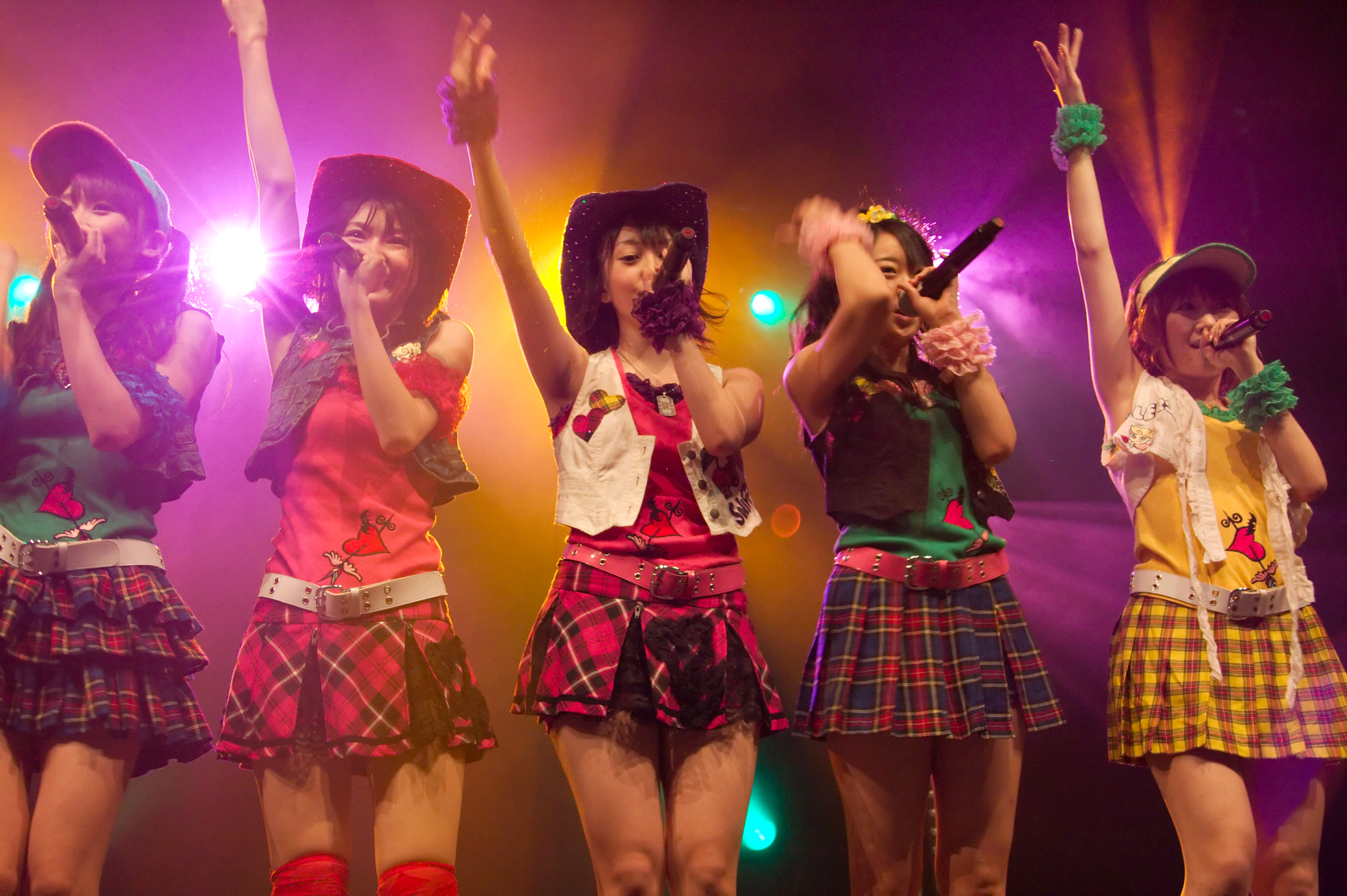
- Studio albums: 7
- Soundtrack albums: 1
- Live albums: 12 (reg) + 20 (SRC)
- Compilation albums: 3
- Singles: 600
- Music videos: 286

The discography of AKB48 consists of 70 singles (68 major singles and 2 indie singles), seven studio albums, three compilation albums, and 32 stage albums (12 regular stage albums and 20 as Studio Recordings Collection). The major singles have title tracks that are sung by a selection of the AKB48 singers, some of whom are from AKB48's sister groups. Some of the singles are considered annual "election singles", that is, they contain ballots for a popularity contest to determine the line-up for the next single. Other singles have line-ups that are determined by rock-paper-scissors tournaments that are held annually. The group was created and currently produced by Yasushi Akimoto, who also writes the lyrics for all of the group's songs. They released 2 compilation albums before released their debut album titled Koko ni Ita Koto.

== Albums ==
=== Studio albums ===
Title	Details	Peak chart positions	Sales	Certification
Title	Details	JPN	Sales	Certification
Koko ni Ita Koto (ここにいたこと)	Released: June 8, 2011; Label: King Records; Formats: CD, digital download	1	JPN: 883,267	RIAJ: Million
1830m	Released: August 15, 2012; Label: King Records; Formats: CD, digital download	1	JPN: 1,042,879	RIAJ: Million
Tsugi no Ashiato (次の足跡)	Released: January 22, 2014; Label: King Records; Formats: CD, digital download	1	JPN: 1,041,951	RIAJ: Million
Koko ga Rhodes da, Koko de Tobe! (ここがロドスだ、ここで跳べ!)	Released: January 21, 2015; Label: King Records; Formats: CD, digital download	1	JPN: 780,591	RIAJ: 3× Platinum
Thumbnail (サムネイル)	Released: January 25, 2017; Label: King Records; Formats: CD, digital download	1	JPN: 632,615	RIAJ: 3× Platinum
Bokutachi wa, Ano Hi no Yoake o Shitteiru (僕たちは、あの日の夜明けを知っている)	Released: January 24, 2018; Label: King Records; Formats: CD, digital download	1	JPN: 611,056	RIAJ: 2× Platinum
Nantettatte AKB48 (なんてったってAKB48)	Released: December 25, 2024; Label: EMI, Universal Japan; Formats: CD, digital download	1	JPN: 184,764	RIAJ: Gold

=== Compilation albums ===
Title	Details	Peak chart positions	Sales	Certification
Title	Details	JPN	Sales	Certification
Set List: Greatest Songs 2006–2007 (SET LIST～グレイテストソングス 2006–2007～)	Released: January 1, 2008; Label: Defstar Records; Formats: CD, digital download	29	JPN: 53,583	RIAJ: Platinum
Set List: Greatest Songs 2006–2007 (SET LIST～グレイテストソングス 2006–2007～)	Re-released: July 14, 2010 (as Set List: Greatest Songs Kanzenban); Label: Defstar Records; Formats: CD, digital download	2	JPN: 169,730	RIAJ: Gold
Kamikyokutachi (神曲たち)	Released: April 7, 2010; Label: King Records; Formats: CD, digital download	1	JPN: 564,298	RIAJ: 2× Platinum
0 to 1 no Aida (0と1の間)	Released: November 18, 2015; Label: King Records; Formats: CD, digital download	1	JPN: 715,109	RIAJ: 3× Platinum

=== Theater albums ===
Title	Catalog number	Release date	Peak chart positions	Sales
Title	Catalog number	Release date	JPN	Sales
Defstar Records
Team A 1st Stage "Party ga Hajimaru yo" (チームA 1st Stage「PARTYが始まるよ」)	DFCL-1351	March 7, 2007	180	1,365
Team A 2nd Stage "Aitakatta" (チームA 2nd Stage「会いたかった」)	DFCL-1352	March 7, 2007	181	1,958
Team A 3rd Stage "Dareka no Tame ni" (チームA 3rd Stage「誰かのために」)	DFCL-1353	March 7, 2007	160	2,186
Team K 1st Stage "Party ga Hajimaru yo" (チームK 1st Stage「PARTYが始まるよ」)	DFCL-1354	March 7, 2007	247	1,242
Team K 2nd Stage "Seishun Girls" (チームK 2nd Stage「青春ガールズ」)	DFCL-1355	March 7, 2007	190	1,516
Team K 3rd Stage "Nōnai Paradise" (チームK 3rd Stage「脳内パラダイス」)	DFCL-1356	March 7, 2007	188	3,121
AKS
Team A 5th Stage "Ren'ai Kinshi Jōrei" (チームA 5th Stage「恋愛禁止条例」)	AKB-D2021	August 11, 2009	Sold only at the AKB48 Theater and online	
Team K 5th Stage "Saka Agari" (チームK 5th Stage「逆上がり」)	AKB-D2022	August 11, 2009	Sold only at the AKB48 Theater and online	
Team B 4th Stage "Idol no Yoake" (チームB 4th Stage「アイドルの夜明け」)	AKB-D2023	August 11, 2009	Sold only at the AKB48 Theater and online	
Team K 6th Stage "Reset" (チームK 6th Stage「RESET」)	AKB-D2057	August 7, 2010	Sold only at the AKB48 Theater and online	
Team B 5th Stage "Theater no Megami" (チームB 5th Stage「シアターの女神」)	AKB-D2058	August 7, 2010	Sold only at the AKB48 Theater and online	
Team A 6th Stage "Mokugekisha" (チームA 6th Stage「目撃者」)	AKB-D2059	September 18, 2010	Sold only at the AKB48 Theater and online	

==== Studio Recordings Collection ====
On New Year's Day of 2013, AKB48 released the Studio Recordings Collection. It was planned to have the set lists of 20 performances. Eight of the albums had been previously unreleased. Each 2-disc album includes extra songs and karaoke tracks not on previous versions.

Title	Cat. no.	Release date	Peak chart positions	Sales
Title	Cat. no.	Release date	JPN	Sales
Team A 1st Stage "Party ga Hajimaru yo" (Studio Recordings Collection) (Team A 1st stage「PARTYが始まるよ」～studio recordings コレクション～)	DFCL-1861/2	January 1, 2013	73	4,063
Team A 2nd Stage "Aitakatta" (Studio Recordings Collection) (Team A 2nd stage「会いたかった」～studio recordings コレクション～)	DFCL-1863/4	January 1, 2013	88	3,442
Team A 3rd Stage "Dareka no Tame ni" (Studio Recordings Collection) (Team A 3rd stage「誰かのために」～studio recordings コレクション～)	DFCL-1865/6	January 1, 2013	84	3,592
Team A 4th Stage "Tadaima Ren'aichū" (Studio Recordings Collection) (Team A 4th stage「ただいま恋愛中」～studio recordings コレクション～)	DFCL-1867/8	January 1, 2013	27	10,205
Team A 5th Stage "Renai Kinshi Jōrei" (Studio Recordings Collection) (Team A 5th stage「恋愛禁止条例」～studio recordings コレクション～)	KICS-1861/2	January 1, 2013	47	7,474
Team A 6th Stage "Mokugekisha" (Studio Recordings Collection) (Team A 6th Stage「目撃者」～studio recordings コレクション～)	KICS-1863/4	January 1, 2013	40	8,363
Team K 1st Stage "Party ga Hajimaru yo" (Studio Recordings Collection) (Team K 1st stage「PARTYが始まるよ」～studio recordings コレクション～)	DFCL-1869/70	January 1, 2013	115	2,528
Team K 2nd Stage "Seishun Girls" (Studio Recordings Collection) (Team K 2nd stage「青春ガールズ」～studio recordings コレクション～)	DFCL-1871/2	January 1, 2013	93	3,105
Team K 3rd Stage "Nōnai Paradise" (Studio Recordings Collection) (Team K 3rd stage「脳内パラダイス」～studio recordings コレクション～)	DFCL-1873/4	January 1, 2013	85	3,542
Team K 4th Stage "Saishū Bell ga Naru" (Studio Recordings Collection) (Team K 4th stage「最終ベルが鳴る」〜studio recordings コレクション〜)	KICS-1865/6	January 1, 2013	22	11,407
Team K 5th Stage "Saka Agari" (Studio Recordings Collection) (Team K 5th stage「逆上がり」～studio recordings コレクション～)	KICS-1867/8	January 1, 2013	52	6,484
Team K 6th Stage "Reset" (Studio Recordings Collection) (Team K 6th Stage 「RESET」～studio recordings コレクション～)	KICS-1869/70	January 1, 2013	37	8,967
Team B 1st Stage "Seishun Girls" (Studio Recordings Collection) (Team B 1st stage「青春ガールズ」～studio recordings コレクション～)	DFCL-1875/6	January 1, 2013	91	3,370
Team B 2nd Stage "Aitakatta" (Studio Recordings Collection) (Team B 2nd stage「会いたかった」～studio recordings コレクション～)	DFCL-1877/8	January 1, 2013	83	3,706
Team B 3rd Stage "Pajama Drive" (Studio Recordings Collection) (Team B 3rd Stage「パジャマドライブ」～studio recordings コレクション～)	KICS-1871/2	January 1, 2013	17	15,087
Team B 4th Stage "Idol no Yoake" (Studio Recordings Collection) (Team B 4th Stage「アイドルの夜明け」～studio recordings コレクション～)	KICS-1873/4	January 1, 2013	53	6,230
Team B 5th Stage "Theater no Megami" (Studio Recordings Collection) (Team B 5th Stage 「シアターの女神」～studio recordings コレクション～)	KICS-1875/6	January 1, 2013	43	7,901
Himawarigumi 1st Stage "Boku no Taiyō" (Studio Recordings Collection) (ひまわり組 1st stage「僕の太陽」～studio recordings コレクション～)	DFCL-1879/80	January 1, 2013	30	9,195
Himawarigumi 2nd Stage "Yume o Shinaseru Wake ni Ikanai" (Studio Recordings Collection) (ひまわり組 2nd Stage「夢を死なせるわけにいかない」～studio recordings コレクション～)	KICS-1877/8	January 1, 2013	31	6,914
Team 4 1st Stage "Boku no Taiyō" (Studio Recordings Collection) (Team 4 1st Stage 「僕の太陽」～studio recordings コレクション～)	KICS-1879/80	January 22, 2013	22	6,963

== Singles ==
List of singles, with selected chart positions, showing year released, certifications and album name
Title	Year	Peak chart positions			Total sales	Certifications	Albums
Title	Year	JPN	JPN Hot	JPN RIAJ (Note: RIAJ Digital Track Chart was established in April 2009 and cancelled in July 2012.)	Total sales	Certifications	Albums
"Sakura no Hanabiratachi" (桜の花びらたち) (Note: Independently released)	2006	10	—	—	46,274		Set List: Greatest; Songs; 2006–2007
"Skirt, Hirari" (スカート、ひらり)	2006	13	—	—	20,609		Set List: Greatest; Songs; 2006–2007
"Aitakatta" (会いたかった)	2006	12	—	32 (Note: Charted in 2010)	55,308	RIAJ: Gold (phy.); 2× Platinum (dig.); 2× Platinum (rt.)	Set List: Greatest; Songs; 2006–2007
"Seifuku ga Jama o Suru" (制服が邪魔をする)	2007	7	—	—	21,989		Set List: Greatest; Songs; 2006–2007
"Keibetsu Shiteita Aijō" (軽蔑していた愛情)	2007	8	—	—	22,671		Set List: Greatest; Songs; 2006–2007
"Bingo!"	2007	6	—	—	25,611		Set List: Greatest; Songs; 2006–2007
"Boku no Taiyō" (僕の太陽)	2007	6	—	—	28,840		Set List: Greatest; Songs; 2006–2007
"Yūhi o Miteiru ka?" (夕陽を見ているか?)	2007	10	—	—	18,429		Set List: Greatest; Songs; 2006–2007
"Romance, Irane" (ロマンス、イラネ)	2008	6	22	—	23,209		Set List: Greatest; Songs; Kanzenban
"Sakura no Hanabiratachi 2008" (桜の花びらたち2008) (Note: Major label re-recording/re-release from "Sakura no Hanabiratachi" (2006 version))	2008	10	26	—	25,482		Set List: Greatest; Songs; Kanzenban
"Baby! Baby! Baby!" (Note: Digital single)	2008	—	—	—			Kamikyokutachi
"Ōgoe Diamond" (大声ダイヤモンド)	2008	3	13	51	96,566	RIAJ: Gold (phy.); Gold (dig.); Platinum (rt.)	Kamikyokutachi
"10nen Zakura" (10年桜)	2009	3	13	—	124,700	RIAJ: Gold (phy.); Platinum (dig.); Gold (rt.)	Kamikyokutachi
"Namida Surprise!" (涙サプライズ！) (Note: Contained a voting card for AKB48 general elections)	2009	2	5	28	168,826	RIAJ: Gold (phy.); Platinum (dig.); Gold (rt.)	Kamikyokutachi
"Iiwake Maybe" (言い訳Maybe) (Note: Lineup determined by general election)	2009	2	2	11	145,776	RIAJ: Gold (phy.); Platinum (dig.); Platinum (rt.)	Kamikyokutachi
"River"	2009	1	2	17	260,553	RIAJ: Platinum (phy.); 2× Platinum (dig.); Platinum (rt.)	Kamikyokutachi
"Sakura no Shiori" (桜の栞)	2010	1	1	15	404,696	RIAJ: Platinum (phy.); Platinum (dig.); Gold (rt.)	Kamikyokutachi
"Ponytail to Shushu" (ポニーテールとシュシュ)	2010	1	1	4	740,291	RIAJ: 3× Platinum (phy.); Million (dig.); 2× Platinum (rt.)	Koko ni Ita; Koto
"Heavy Rotation" (ヘビーローテーション)	2010	1	1	1	881,519	RIAJ: 3× Platinum (phy.); 2× Platinum (dig.); 3× Platinum (rt.); Million (rt.)	Koko ni Ita; Koto
"Beginner"	2010	1	1	2	1,039,362	RIAJ: Million (phy.); Million (dig.); 2× Platinum (rt.)	Koko ni Ita; Koto
"Chance no Junban" (チャンスの順番) (Note: Lineup determined by rock-paper-scissors tournament.: "Chance no Junban"; "Ue kara Mariko"; "Eien Pressure"; "Suzukake Nanchara")	2010	1	1	12	694,042	RIAJ: 3× Platinum (phy.); Platinum (dig.); Gold (rt.)	Koko ni Ita; Koto
"Sakura no Ki ni Narō" (桜の木になろう)	2011	1	1	3	1,081,686	RIAJ: Million (phy.); 2× Platinum (dig.); Platinum (rt.)	1830m
"Everyday, Katyusha" (Everyday、カチューシャ)	2011	1	1	1	1,608,299	RIAJ: Million (phy.); Million (dig.); 2× Platinum (rt.); 2× Platinum (rt.)	1830m
"Flying Get" (フライングゲット)	2011	1	1	1	1,625,849	RIAJ: Million (phy.); Million (dig.); 2× Platinum (rt.)	1830m
"Kaze wa Fuiteiru" (風は吹いている)	2011	1	1	1	1,457,113	RIAJ: Million (phy.); 2× Platinum (dig.); Platinum (rt.)	1830m
"Ue kara Mariko" (上からマリコ)	2011	1	1	3	1,304,903	RIAJ: Million (phy.); Platinum; Gold (rt.)	1830m
"Give Me Five!"	2012	1	1	1	1,436,519	RIAJ: Million (phy.); 2× Platinum (dig.); Gold (rt.)	1830m
"Manatsu no Sounds Good!" (真夏のSounds good!)	2012	1	1	2	1,822,220	RIAJ: 2× Million (phy.); 2× Platinum (dig.); Gold (rt.)	Tsugi no Ashiato
"Gingham Check" (ギンガムチェック)	2012	1	1	*	1,316,240	RIAJ: Million (phy.); Platinum (dig.); Gold (rt.)	Tsugi no Ashiato
"Uza"	2012	1	1	*	1,263,148	RIAJ: Million (phy.); Gold (dig.)	Tsugi no Ashiato
"Eien Pressure" (永遠プレッシャー)	2012	1	1	*	1,206,869	RIAJ: Million (phy.); Gold (dig.)	Tsugi no Ashiato
"So Long!"	2013	1	1	*	1,132,853	RIAJ: Million (phy.); Gold (dig.)	Tsugi no Ashiato
"Sayonara Crawl" (さよならクロール)	2013	1	1	*	1,955,800	RIAJ: 2× Million (phy.); Gold (dig.)	Tsugi no Ashiato
"Koi Suru Fortune Cookie" (恋するフォーチュンクッキー)	2013	1	1	*	1,549,343	RIAJ: Million (phy.); Million (dig.); Gold (rt.)	Tsugi no Ashiato
"Heart Electric" (ハート・エレキ)	2013	1	1	*	1,294,197	RIAJ: Million (phy.); Gold (dig.)	Koko ga Rhodes da, Koko de Tobe!
"Suzukake Nanchara" (鈴懸なんちゃら) (Note: Full title is "Suzukake no Ki no Michi de 'Kimi no Hohoemi o Yume ni Miru' to Itte Shimattara Bokutachi no Kankei wa Dō Kawatte Shimau no ka, Bokunari ni Nannichi ka Kangaeta Ue de no Yaya Kihazukashii Ketsuron no Yō na Mono" (鈴懸の木の道で「君の微笑みを夢に見る」と言ってしまったら僕たちの関係はどう変わってしまうのか、僕なりに何日か考えた上でのやや気恥ずかしい結論のようなもの).)	2013	1	1	*	1,086,491	RIAJ: Million (phy.)	Koko ga Rhodes da, Koko de Tobe!
"Mae shika Mukanee" (前しか向かねえ)	2014	1	1	*	1,153,906	RIAJ: Million (phy.); Gold (dig.)	Koko ga Rhodes da, Koko de Tobe!
"Labrador Retriever" (ラブラドール･レトリバー)	2014	1	1	*	1,787,367	RIAJ: Million (phy.); Gold (dig.)	Koko ga Rhodes da, Koko de Tobe!
"Kokoro no Placard" (心のプラカード)	2014	1	1	*	1,061,976	RIAJ: Million (phy.); Gold (dig.)	Koko ga Rhodes da, Koko de Tobe!
"Kibōteki Refrain" (希望的リフレイン)	2014	1	1	*	1,199,429	RIAJ: Million (phy.); Gold (dig.)	Koko ga Rhodes da, Koko de Tobe!
"Green Flash"	2015	1	1	*	1,045,492	RIAJ: Million (phy.)	0 to 1 no Aida
"Bokutachi wa Tatakawanai" (僕たちは戦わない)	2015	1	1	*	1,782,897	RIAJ: Million (phy.)	0 to 1 no Aida
"Halloween Night" (ハロウィン・ナイト)	2015	1	1	*	1,331,573	RIAJ: Million (phy.); Gold (dig.)	0 to 1 no Aida
"Kuchibiru ni Be My Baby" (唇にBe My Baby)	2015	1	1	*	1,093,559	RIAJ: Million (phy.)	Thumbnail
"Kimi wa Melody" (君はメロディー)	2016	1	1	*	1,470,789	RIAJ: Million (phy.)	Thumbnail
"Tsubasa wa Iranai" (翼はいらない)	2016	1	1	*	2,507,403	RIAJ: 2× Million (phy.)	Thumbnail
"Love Trip"	2016	1	1	*	1,412,112	RIAJ: Million (phy.)	Thumbnail
"Shiawase o Wakenasai" (しあわせを分けなさい)	2016	1	29	*	1,412,112	RIAJ: Million (phy.)	Thumbnail
"High Tension" (ハイテンション)	2016	1	1	*	1,469,811	RIAJ: Million (phy.)	Thumbnail
"Shoot Sign" (シュートサイン)	2017	1	1	*	1,353,450	RIAJ: Million (phy.)	Bokutachi wa, Ano Hi no Yoake wo Shitteiru
"Negaigoto no Mochigusare" (願いごとの持ち腐れ)	2017	1	1	*	2,649,234	RIAJ: 2× Million (phy.)	Bokutachi wa, Ano Hi no Yoake wo Shitteiru
"#Sukinanda" (#好きなんだ)	2017	1	1	*	1,493,543	RIAJ: Million (phy.)	Bokutachi wa, Ano Hi no Yoake wo Shitteiru
"11gatsu no Anklet" (11月のアンクレット)	2017	1	1	*	1,533,025	RIAJ: Million (phy.)	Bokutachi wa, Ano Hi no Yoake wo Shitteiru
"Jabaja" (ジャーバージャ)	2018	1	1	*	1,260,919	RIAJ: Million (phy.)	Non-album singles
"Teacher Teacher"	2018	1	1	*	2,922,460	RIAJ: 3× Million (phy.)	Non-album singles
"Sentimental Train" (センチメンタルトレイン)	2018	1	1	*	1,639,898	RIAJ: Million (phy.)	Non-album singles
"No Way Man"	2018	1	1	*	1,383,997	RIAJ: Million (phy.)	Non-album singles
"Jiwaru Days" (ジワるDAYS)	2019	1	1	*	1,460,302	RIAJ: Million (phy.)	Non-album singles
"Sustainable" (サステナブル)	2019	1	1	*	1,628,184	RIAJ: Million (phy.)	Non-album singles
"Shitsuren, Arigatō" (失恋、ありがとう)	2020	1	1	*	1,414,077	RIAJ: Million (phy.)	Non-album singles
"Nemohamo Rumor" (根も葉もRumor)	2021	1	1	*	554,247	RIAJ: 2× Platinum (phy.)	Non-album singles
"Motokare Desu" (元カレです)	2022	1	3	*	537,081	RIAJ: 2× Platinum (phy.)	Non-album singles
"Hisashiburi no Lip Gloss" (久しぶりのリップグロス)	2022	1	4	*	568,608	RIAJ: 2× Platinum (phy.)	Non-album singles
"Dōshitemo Kimi ga Suki da" (どうしても君が好きだ)	2023	1	3	*	700,740	RIAJ: 2× Platinum (phy.)	Non-album singles
"Idol Nanka Janakattara" (アイドルなんかじゃなかったら)	2023	1	4	*	700,318	RIAJ: 3× Platinum (phy.)	Non-album singles
"Colorcon Wink" (カラコンウインク)	2024	1	2	*	648,599	RIAJ: 2× Platinum (phy.)	Non-album singles
"Koi Tsunjatta" (恋 詰んじゃった)	2024	1	3	*	644,685	RIAJ: 2× Platinum (phy.)	Non-album singles
"Masaka no Confession" (まさかのConfession)	2025	1	3	*	624,790	RIAJ: 2× Platinum (phy.)	Non-album singles
"Oh My Pumpkin!"	2025	1	4	*	647,524	RIAJ: 2× Platinum (phy.)	Non-album singles
"Nagorizakura" (名残り桜)	2026	1	3	*	773,054	RIAJ: 3× Platinum (phy.)	Non-album singles
"Suki-ish" (好きish)	2026	1	2	*	864,042	RIAJ: 3× Platinum (phy.)	Non-album singles
"—" denotes releases that did not chart.

== Other charted songs ==
Title	Year	Peak chart positions		Certifications	Albums
Title	Year	JPN Hot	JPN RIAJ	Certifications	Albums
"Kimi no Koto ga Suki Dakara" (君のことが好きだから)	2009	—	—	RIAJ: Gold (dig.)	"River"
"Majisuka Rock 'n' Roll" (マジスカロックンロール)	2010	—	14	RIAJ: Gold (rt.)	"Sakura no Shiori"
"Enkyori Poster" (遠距離ポスター) (Team Play-Boy)	2010	—	96	*	"Sakura no Shiori"
"Jibun Rashisa" (自分らしさ)	2010	—	54	*	Kamikyokutachi
"Kimi to Niji to Taiyō to" (君と虹と太陽と)	2010	35	25	*	Kamikyokutachi
"Majijo Teppen Blues" (マジジョテッペンブルース)	2010	—	55	RIAJ: Gold (dig.)	"Ponytail to Shushu"
"Anata ga Ite Kureta Kara" (あなたがいてくれたから)	2010	97	22	*	Set List: Greatest Songs Kanzenban
"Yasai Sisters" (野菜シスターズ)	2010	—	73	RIAJ: Gold (dig.)	"Heavy Rotation"
"Yoyakushita Christmas" (予約したクリスマス)	2010	—	26	*	"Chance no Junban"
"Kurumi to Dialogue" (胡桃とダイアローグ)	2010	—	71	*	"Chance no Junban"
"Dareka no Tame ni: What Can I Do for Someone?" (誰かのために〜What can I do for someone?〜)	2011	17	2	RIAJ: Gold (dig.)	Digital charity single
"Yankee Soul" (ヤンキーソウル)	2011	74	—	RIAJ: Gold (dig.)	"Everyday, Katyusha"
"Kimi no Tame ni Boku wa…" (君のために僕は...)	2012	69	—	*	"Manatsu no Sounds Good!"
"First Rabbit" (ファースト・ラビット)	2012	43	*	*	1830m
"Yume no Kawa" (夢の河)	2012	38	*	*	"Gingham Check"
"Jūryoku Sympathy" (重力シンパシー) (Team Surprise)	2012	—	*	RIAJ: Gold (dig.)	Non-album single
"Sugar Rush"	2012	— (Note: "Sugar Rush" peaked at number 11 on Billboard Japan Hot Animation chart.)	*	*	Wreck-It Ralph (Original Motion Picture Soundtrack)
"Tenohira ga Kataru Koto" (掌が語ること)	2013	83	*	*	Free charity single
"After Rain"	2014	21	*	*	Tsugi no Ashiato
"Koko ga Rhodes da, Koko de Tobe!" (ここがロドスだ、ここで跳べ!)	2015	46	*	*	Koko ga Rhodes da, Koko de Tobe!
"365nichi no Kamihikōki" (365日の紙飛行機)	2015	6	*	RIAJ: 3× Platinum (dig.)	"Kuchibiru ni Be My Baby"
"Hikari to Kage no Hibi" (光と影の日々)	2016	48	*	*	"Love Trip / Shiawase o Wakenasai"
"Dare no Koto o Ichiban Aishiteru?" (誰のことを一番 愛してる？)	2017	37	*	*	"Shoot Sign"
"—" denotes releases that did not chart.

== DVDs ==
=== PV collections ===
Title	Release date	Total
Nogashita Sakanatachi ~Single Video Collection~ Kanzen Seisan Genteiban	July 14, 2010	86,372
AKB ga Ippai ~The Best Music Video~ (AKBがいっぱい ～ザ・ベスト・ミュージックビデオ～)	June 24, 2011	524,908
Million ga Ippai 〜AKB48 Music Video Shuu〜 (ミリオンがいっぱい～AKB48ミュージックビデオ集～)	September 11, 2013	
Ano Koro ga Ippai〜AKB48 Music Video Shuu〜 (あの頃がいっぱい〜AKB48ミュージックビデオ集〜)	October 4, 2017	

=== Theater DVDs ===
Year	No.	Title	Release date	Notes
AKS
2006	—	Team A Party ga Hajimaru yo ~1st Stage~ (チームA PARTYが始まるよ 〜1st stage〜)	August 11, 2006	Lim. ed. 1,000 copies
Defstar Records
2007	1	Team A 1st Stage "Party ga Hajimaru yo" (チームA 1st Stage「PARTYが始まるよ」)	March 21, 2007	
2007	2	Team A 2nd Stage "Aitakatta" (チームA 2nd Stage「会いたかった」)	March 21, 2007	
2007	3	Team A 3rd Stage "Dareka no Tame ni" (チームA 3rd Stage「誰かのために」)	March 21, 2007	
2007	4	Team K 1st Stage "Party ga Hajimaru yo" (チームK 1st Stage「PARTYが始まるよ」)	March 21, 2007	
2007	5	Team K 2nd Stage "Seishun Girls" (チームK 2nd Stage「青春ガールズ」)	March 21, 2007	
2007	—	Starter Kit "Ima Kara Demo Maniau AKB48!!" (スターターキット「今からでも間に合うAKB48!!」)	March 21, 2007	Lim. ed. box set
2007	6	Team A 4th Stage "Tadaima Ren'aichū" (チームA 4th Stage「ただいま恋愛中」)	November 28, 2007	
2007	7	Team K 3rd Stage "Nōnai Paradise" (チームK 3rd Stage「脳内パラダイス」)	November 28, 2007	
2008	8	Team B 1st Stage "Seishun Girls" (チームB 1st Stage「青春ガールズ」)	March 26, 2008	
2008	9	Himawarigumi 1st Stage "Boku no Taiyō" (ひまわり組 1st Stage「僕の太陽」)	April 23, 2008	
AKS
2008	10	Team B 2nd Stage "Aitakatta" (チームB 2nd Stage「会いたかった」)	September 26, 2008	
2008	11	Himawarigumi 2nd Stage "Yume o Shinaseru Wake ni Ikanai" (ひまわり組 2nd Stage「夢を死なせるわけにいかない」)	October 5, 2008	
2009	12	Team B 3rd Stage "Pajama Drive" (チームB 3rd Stage「パジャマドライブ」)	April 3, 2009	
2009	13	Team K 4th Stage "Saishū Bell ga Naru" (チームK 4th Stage「最終ベルが鳴る」)	September 11, 2009	
2010	14	Team K 5th Stage "Saka Agari" (チームK 5th Stage「逆上がり」)	April 24, 2010	
2010	15	Team B 4th Stage "Idol no Yoake" (チームB 4th Stage「アイドルの夜明け」)	June 12, 2010	
2010	16	Team A 5th Stage "Ren'ai Kinshi Jōrei" (チームA 5th Stage「恋愛禁止条例」)	June 19, 2010	
2013	17	Minogashita Kimitachi e 2 "AKB48 Group Zenkōen" (見逃した君たちへ2 〜AKB48グループ全公演〜)	February 28, 2012	

=== Concert DVDs ===
DefStar Records Label

- 「会いたかった~柱はないぜ!~」in 日本青年館 Normal Version
- 「会いたかった~柱はないぜ!~」in 日本青年館 Shuffle Version
- AKB48 春のちょっとだけ全国ツアー 〜まだまだだぜAKB48!〜 in 東京厚生年金会館(Tokyo Kōsei Nenkin Kaikan)

AKS Label

- AKB48 リクエストアワーセットリストベスト100 2008(Request Hour Setlist Best100 2008, at Shibuya-AX)
- ライブDVDは出るだろうけど、やっぱり生に限るぜ! AKB48夏祭り(Live DVD wa Derudaroukedo, Yappari Nama ni Kakgiruze! AKB48 Natsumatsuri "Live DVD Will Come Out, But There is Still Best Live! AKB48 Summer Festival", at Hibiya Open-Air Concert Hall)
- AKB48 まさか、このコンサートの音源は流出しないよね?(Masaka, Kono Concert no Ongen wa Ryusyutsu Shinaiyone? "Surely Flow Out of the Sound Source of Concert?", at NHK Hall)
- 年忘れ感謝祭 シャッフルするぜ、AKB! SKEもよろしくね(Toshiwasure Kansyasai Reshuffle Suruze, AKB! SKE mo Yoroshikune "Year-end Thanksgiving Will Reshuffle AKB! Please Treats SKE to", at JCB Hall)
- AKB48 リクエストアワーセットリストベスト100 2009(Request Hour Setlist Best100 2009, at Shibuya-AX)
- 「神公演予定」* 諸般の事情により、神公演にならない場合もありますので、ご了承ください。
- AKB48 分身の術ツアー/AKB104選抜メンバー組閣祭り
- AKB48 分身の術ツアー
- AKB104選抜メンバー組閣祭り (Senbatsu Member Sokaku Matsuri "Allstars Government Festival" Full Version)
- AKB104選抜メンバー組閣祭り("Allstars Government Festival" 3rd Stage Version, at Nippon Budokan)
- AKB48 リクエストアワーセットリストベスト100 2010(Request Hour Setlist Best100 2010, at Shibuya-AX)
- AKB48 満席祭り希望 賛否両論(Manseki Matsuri Kibou Sanpiryouron "Hope Full House Festival The Pros and Cons", at Yokohama Arena)
- AKB48 サプライズはありません(Surprise wa Arimasen "There is no surprise", at Yoyogi National Gymnasium)
- AKB48がやって来た!!(AKB48 ga Yattekita!! "Cames AKB48!!")
- AKB48 リクエストアワーセットリストベスト100 2011(Request Hour Setlist Best100 2011, at Shibuya-AX)
- AKB48 よっしゃぁ～行くぞぉ～!in西武ドーム(Yossha-ikuzo- in Seibu Dome)
- AKBがいっぱい～SUMMER TOUR 2011～(AKB ga ippai-SUMMER TOUR 2011– "Full of AKB")
- AKB48 in a-nation 2011
- AKB48 紅白歌対抗合戦 2011 (AKB48 Kouhaku Taikou Utagassen 2011 "AKB48 Red and White Songs Battle 2011", at Tokyo Dome City Hall
- AKB48 リクエストアワーセットリストベスト100 2012 (AKB48 Request Hour Setlist Best 100 2012 at Tokyo Dome City Hall)
- 日本語タイトル: 前田敦子 涙の卒業宣言! in さいたまスーパーアリーナ 〜業務連絡。頼むぞ、片山部長!〜 スペシャルBOX (Maeda Atsuko Namida no Sotsugyou Sengen! in Saitama Super Arena – Gyomu Renraku. Tanomuzo, Katayama Bucho! – Special Box, "Business Contract. I'll Ask, Katayama Director! in Saitama Super Arena")
- AKB48全国ツアー2012 野中美郷、動く。～47都道府県で会いましょう～TeamK沖縄公演 (AKB48 Zenkoku Tour 2012 Nonaka Misato, Ugoku. -47 Todoufuken de Aimashou- Team K Okinawa Kouen, "AKB48 Whole Country Tour 2012. Nonaka Misato, I Move. ～See you in 47 Prefectures～ Team K Okinawa Performance")
- AKB48 in TOKYO DOME ～1830mの夢～ (AKB48 in TOKYO DOME ~1830m no Yume~,"AKB48 in TOKYO DOME ~The 1830m Dream" at Tokyo Dome) – Sales: TBA (DVD), 51,112(Blu-ray)
- AKB48 紅白歌対抗合戦 2012 (AKB48 Kouhaku Taikou Utagassen 2012 "AKB48 Red and White Songs Battle 2012", at Tokyo Dome City Hall) – Sales: 34,469(DVD), 16,630(Blu-ray)
- AKB48 リクエストアワーセットリストベスト100 2013 (AKB48 Request Hour Setlist Best 100 2013 at Tokyo Dome City Hall) – Sales: 22,002(DVD), TBA(Blu-ray)

== Bibliography ==
=== Manga ===
- AKB49: Renai Kinshi Jourei (AKB49 ~恋愛禁止条例~)
- AKB48 Satsujin Jiken (AKB48殺人事件)
- AKB0048 Episode 0

== Documentaries ==
- Documentary of AKB48 To Be Continued: 10nen go, Shōjotachi wa Ima no Jibun ni Nani o Omou Nodarō? (DOCUMENTARY of AKB48 to be continued 10年後、少女たちは今の自分に何を思うのだろう?) (2011)
- Documentary of AKB48 Show Must Go On: Shōjotachi wa Kizutsuki Nagara, Yume o Miru (DOCUMENTARY of AKB48 Show must go on 少女たちは傷つきながら、夢を見る) (2012)
- Documentary of AKB48 No Flower Without Rain: Shōjotachi wa Namida no Ato ni Nani o Miru? (DOCUMENTARY of AKB48 NO FLOWER WITHOUT RAIN 少女たちは涙の後に何を見る?) (2013)
- Documentary of AKB48 The Time Has Come: Shōjotachi wa, Ima, Sono Senaka ni Nani o Omou? (DOCUMENTARY of AKB48 The time has come 少女たちは、今、その背中に何を想う?) (2014)
- Raison D'etre: Documentary of AKB48 (存在する理由 DOCUMENTARY OF AKB48) (2016)
