= Macyarin =

Taiwanese gaijin tarento

- 真楪伶
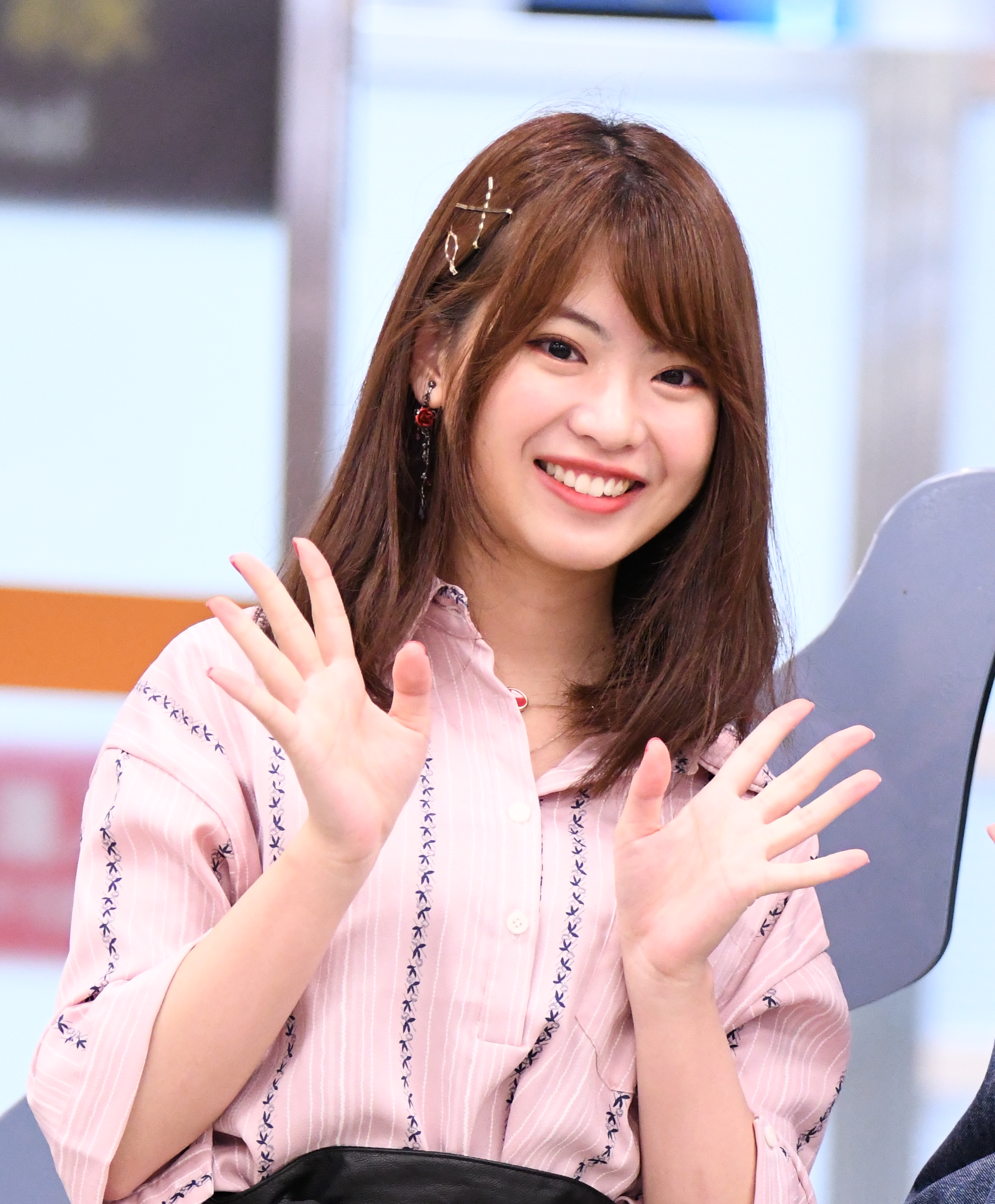
- Macyarin in 2019
- Born: Ma Chia-ling; 21 December 1996 (age 29); Kaohsiung, Taiwan
- Years active: 2015–present
- Agent(s): Elixir Co., Ltd.

Chinese name
- Chinese: 馬嘉伶
Transcriptions
Standard Mandarin
- Hanyu Pinyin: Mǎ Jiālíng

Japanese name
- Kanji: 真 楪伶
- Kana: マ・チャリン
Transcriptions
- Romanization: Ma Charin

YouTube information
- Channel: Macyarin, Tokidoki Pamii Mo Iru Yo
- Years active: 2023–present
- Genre: Vlog
- Subscribers: 4 thousand
- Views: 96 thousand
- Last updated: 21 February 2024
- Musical career
- Genre: J-pop
- Instrument: Vocals
- Years active: 2015 – 2024
- Label: King Records
- Formerly of: AKB48
- Website: https://lit.link/macyarin

Ma Chia-ling (Chinese: 馬嘉伶; pinyin: Mǎ Jiālíng; born 21 December 1996), currently known under the stage name Macyarin (真(ま) 楪伶(ちゃりん), Ma Charin), is a Taiwanese tarento based in Japan. She was a member of the Japanese idol girl group AKB48. She was also the first and so far only member of AKB48 who is not Japanese. Her nickname is "Macharin" (まちゃりん). Má Ka-lêng is her Hokkien name.

== Career ==
Ma debuted on 16 December 2015 at a concert of AKB48. She sang "Heavy Rotation" which was a mix of Japanese and Chinese. On 21 February 2016, she was officially promoted to Team B.

Ma entered the Senbatsu for AKB48's 51st single "Jabaja", which was released on March 14, 2018. She was also the lead performer for the unit Macharin and Friends. (まちゃりんと仲間たち。, Macharin to Nakamatachi.) which performed the coupling song "Tomodachi ga Dekita" (友達ができた).

On May 25, 2020, Ma announced her agency transfer from AKS to JPEG, Co. Ltd., as well as the launching of her YouTube channel. In 2022, she later changed her agency to CANVAS, an agency owned by stage production company ILLUMINUS.

On November 30, 2023, Ma announced that she will be graduating from AKB48. Her graduation was on February 20, 2024. After graduation, she aims to become a gaijin tarento and actress under the name of Macyarin (真 楪伶, Ma Charin), pronounced the same way in Japanese as her real name but written with different kanji characters.

Ma's first photobook, titled Kiseki to Deatta Toki (奇跡と出会った瞬間(とき); lit. 'The Time I Encountered a Miracle'), was released on July 11, 2024, published by Kadokawa and photographed in Bali, Indonesia. The title is a reference to her stage name: the second kanji of her name, 楪, which represents the yuzuriha tree, contains two ki (木) and one se (世) radicals, which form a homophone to the word kiseki (奇跡; lit. 'miracle').

On November 30, 2024, Ma's contract with CANVAS expired, and she announced that she is going independent. However, her freelance days were short, since on January 1, 2025, she became affiliated with Elixir Co., Ltd.

== Discography ==
=== Singles with AKB48 ===
Year	No.	Title	Role	Notes
2016	44	"Tsubasa wa Iranai"	B-side	Sang on "Koi wo Suru to Baka wo Miru" as Team B. First single with Team B.
2017	48	"Negaigoto no Mochigusare"	B-side	Sang on "Maebure".
2017	49	"#Sukinanda"	B-side	Sang on "Private Summer" as Showroom Senbatsu.
2018	51	"Jabaja"	A-side	Also sang on "Tomodachi ga Dekita" as Ma Chia-ling & Friends.
2018	52	"Teacher Teacher"	B-side	Sang on "Neko Allergy" as Team 4.
2018	53	"Sentimental Train"	B-side	Sang on "Nami ga Tsutaeru Mono" and "Yuri wo Sakaseru ka?".
2021	58	"Nemohamo Rumor"	B-side	Sang on "Ōsawagi Tengoku".
2022	59	"Motokare Desu"	B-side	Sang on "Okubyō na Namake Mono".
2022	60	"Hisashiburi no Lip Gloss"	B-side	Sang on "Unmei no Uta".
2023	61	"Dōshitemo Kimi ga Suki da"	B-side	Sang on "Da Re Da".
2023	62	"Idol Nankaja Nakattara"	B-side	Sang on "In any way".

== Filmography ==
=== Television ===
Year	Title	Role	Network	Notes
2018	Majimuri Gakuen	Rin	Nippon TV	Supporting role
2022	Mellow Love	Rin	SET Metro	Lead role, Taiwanese-Japanese production
