= Tomu Muto =

Japanese tarento

Tomu Mutō
- 武藤十夢
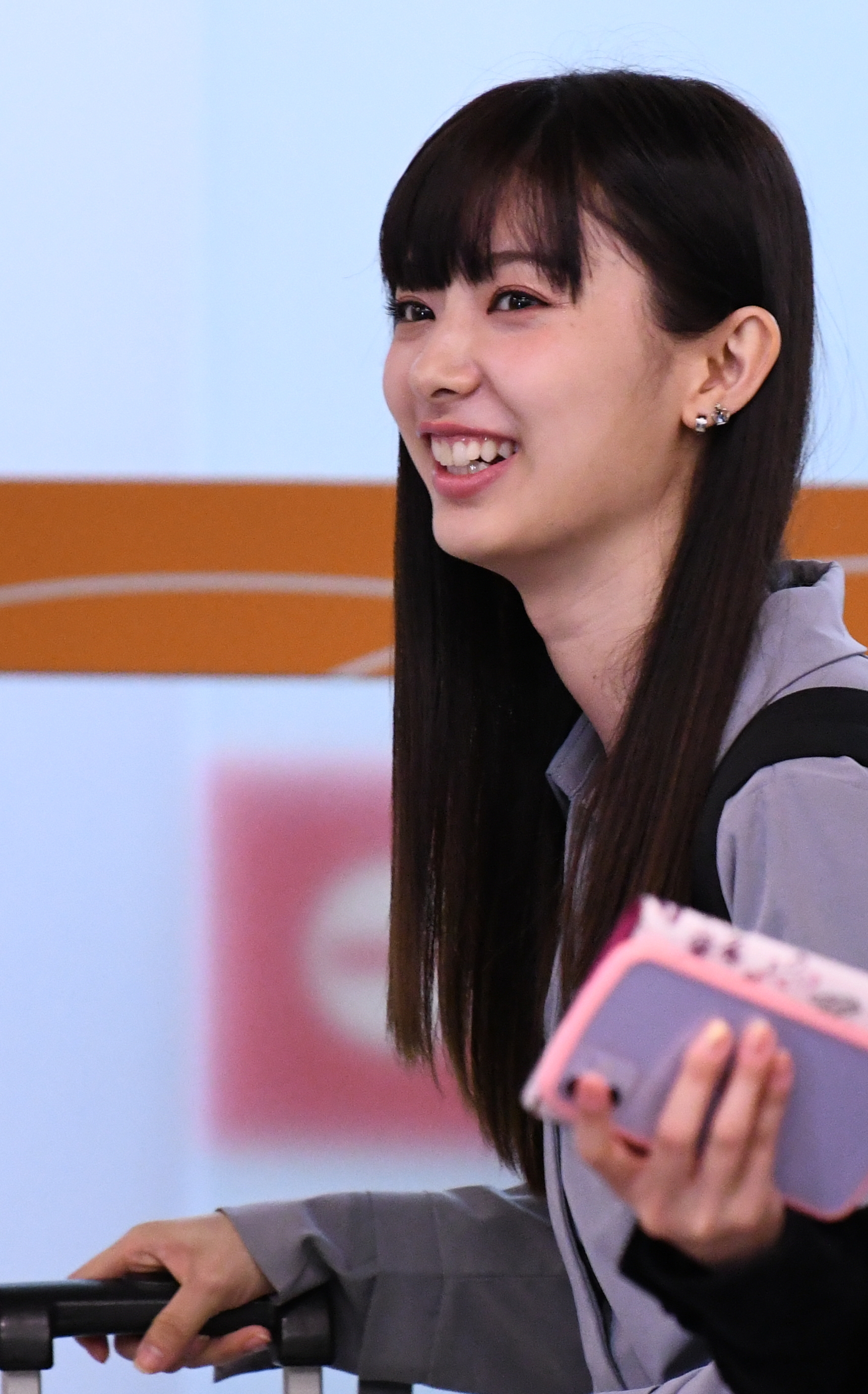
- Muto in 2018
- Born: 25 November 1994 (age 31); Katsushika, Tokyo, Japan
- Occupations: Tarento; Japanese idol, singer (formerly)
- Years active: 2011 – present
- Agent: FIRST AGENT
- Musical career
- Genres: J-pop
- Years active: 2011 – 2023
- Formerly of: AKB48
- Website: mutoutomu.jp

Tomu Mutō (Japanese: 武藤十夢, Hepburn: Mutō Tomu; born November 25, 1994 in Katsushika, Tokyo) is a Japanese tarento, actress, and former idol. She was a member of the idol group AKB48 under Team K. She is an alumna of Seijo University, where she studied economics and also earned her postgraduate degree, as well as a certified weather presenter, financial planner, disaster prevention specialist and a career counselor.

== Career ==
=== 2011 ===
Muto passed the AKB48 12th generation audition for the trainee section in February 2011. She was featured in AKB48 Single for the first time in Kaze wa Fuiteiru, in the coupling song "Tsubomitachi". She didn't qualify in rock-paper-scissors tournament on September 20, 2011.

=== 2012 ===
She was promoted to Team K after the AKB48 Tokyo Dome Shuffle on August 24, 2012. In the elections for the 27th single of AKB48, she placed 49th overall with 6,428 votes and became the center of Future Girls. She is the center of Gingham Check's coupling song, "Show Fight!". "Show Fight!" remained one of few songs to rank on every Request Hour since first participation. She didn't qualify in rock-paper-scissors tournament on September 18, 2012.

=== 2013 ===
In the elections for the 32nd single of AKB48, she placed 45th overall with 16,221 votes and became Next Girls and was featured in Koi Suru Fortune Cookie's coupling song, "Kondo Koso Ecstasy". She was eliminated in first round in rock-paper-scissors tournament on September 18, 2013, she was lost to Jurina Matsui, who would win that tournament. Even though she didn't place in the tournament, she was featured in Suzukake Nanchara's coupling song, "Mosh & Dive".

=== 2014 ===
On January 9, 2014, she was being selected as one of the 50 winners of the Young Jump Gravure Competition. On February 24, 2014, during the AKB48 Group Daisokaku Matsuri, it was announced that she was transferred to team A. In the elections for the 37th single of AKB48, she placed 24th overall with 30,097 votes and became Undergirls and was featured in Kokoro no Placard's coupling song, "Dareka ga Nageta Ball". She became senbatsu for the first time in Kibōteki Refrain. She was eliminated in second round in rock-paper-scissors tournament on September 17, 2014.

=== 2015 ===
She was transferred back to Team K after the AKB48 Spring Shuffle 2015 on March 26, 2015. She was being chosen for senbatsu in Bokutachi wa Tatakawanai, which contained a voting card for AKB48 41st Single Senbatsu Sousenkyo. She was also featured in Bokutachi wa Tatakawanai's coupling song, "Summer side". In the elections for the 41st single of AKB48, she placed 16th overall with 44,637 votes and became senbatsu of Halloween Night. She was eliminated in second round in rock-paper-scissors tournament on September 16, 2015. She got the 2nd place in the last round voting for the audition held by Young Magazine and won a 1-year exclusive gravure contract with the magazine. Her first solo gravure under the contract was published on November 9, 2015.

=== 2016 ===
She was being chosen for senbatsu again in Tsubasa wa Iranai, which contained a voting card for AKB48 45th Single Senbatsu Sousenkyo. In the elections for the 45th single of AKB48, she placed 10th overall with 58,624 votes and became senbatsu of Love Trip / Shiawase o Wakenasai. She was eliminated in first round in rock-paper-scissors tournament on October 10, 2016.

=== 2017 ===
Muto graduated from the economics department of Seijo University. She enrolled into a master's degree program the same year.

She was being chosen for senbatsu again in Shoot Sign and Negaigoto no Mochigusare, both of two singles she was featured as media senbatsu for the first time. She applied for the AKB48 49th Single Senbatsu Sousenkyo, but retired her application on April 12, 2017. She formed "Okapa-zu" unit with Nao Furuhata and Nana Fujita to participate in AKB48 Group Unit Janken Tournament 2017. They were eliminated in first round in rock-paper-scissors tournament on September 24, 2017.

=== 2018 ===
She featured in Teacher Teacher's coupling song, "Shuuden no Yoru". This was the first time she was featured in an AKB48 single since Negaigoto no Mochigusare. In the elections for the 45th single of AKB48, she placed 7th overall with 62,611 votes and became senbatsu of AKB48 53rd Single. She also joined Produce 48 as one of 39 girls from AKB48 to form a Korean-Japanese group that will promote for two and a half years. They will adopt the AKB48's concept of "idols you can meet and greet" and be able to perform in their own theatre. Members of the group will be able to promote under their own agencies concurrently. In the grade evaluation, she was given a D grade and stayed in Class D after the re-evaluation. In the battle evaluation, she was one of members who performed GFriend's Love Whisper as Team 1. They lost the battle to Team 2 and didn't receive a benefit of 1000 votes. As of Episode 5, she ranked 33 and survived the elimination round. In the position evaluation, she was in the team which chose the song "HandClap" by Fitz and The Tantrums, she ranked 5th place out of the 6 people in her group, she did not get any benefit. As of Episode 8, she ranked 38 and was eliminated.

=== 2019 ===
In April, it was announced that Muto had passed the weather presenter certification examination held by the Japan Meteorological Business Support Center, which has a success rate of 5.5%, after multiple previous attempts. In November 2019, Muto acted in Battles Without Honor and Humanity: On'na-tachi no Shitō-hen, a stage adaptation of the Battles Without Honor and Humanity yakuza film series. She played the role of Tetsuya Sakai, based on Hiroki Matsukata's original portrayal.

=== 2020 ===
On March 23, Muto announced that she has completed her postgraduate study at Seijo University.

=== 2021 ===
On August 17, Muto announced that she joined Ikushima Planning Office (formed by ex-TBS announcer Hiroshi Ikushima) as her new agency, this follows the tradition of AKB48 members transferring from in-house to major agencies such as fellow members Nana Okada and Rin Okabe. It's unknown if Orin will follow suit.

=== 2022 ===
During the second day of AKB48's 60th single release commemorative concert in Nippon Budokan, she announced her graduation from the group. She stated that Hisashiburi no Lip Gloss is her last participated single. She participated in B-side titled "Unmei no Uta" in which she centered. Meanwhile, she would still be active within group activities until March 8, 2023.

=== 2023 ===
On October 2, Muto announced that she had passed the SDGs (Sustainable Development Goals) Certification Exam.

=== 2024 ===
On April 18, Muto announced that she had undergone a tonsillectomy.

On April 22, she announced on her Instagram that she had passed the career consultant exam.

On September 30, it was announced that she has been appointed as a spokesperson for the cybersecurity company ACT.

== Personal life ==
Muto's younger sister, Orin, also joined AKB48 as a 16th Generation member, and from 2018 to 2022, both of them are in Team K until Orin was transferred to Team A in April 2022. She also has a younger brother, who is older than Orin. They own a pet beagle named Oguri.

== Discography ==
=== Singles with AKB48 ===
Year	No.	Title	Role	Songs
2011	23	"Kaze wa Fuiteiru"	Team 4 + Kenkyuusei Members	"Tsubomitachi"
2012	25	"Give Me Five!"	Special Girls C	"Jung ya Freud no Baai"
2012	26	"Manatsu no Sounds Good!"	Special Girls	"Mittsu no Namida"
2012	27	"Gingham Check"	Future Girls	"Show Fight!"
2012	28	"Uza"	Under Girls	"Tsugi no Season"
2012	28	"Uza"	Team K	"Scrap & Build"
2012	29	"Eien Pressure"		"Watashitachi no Reason"
2013	30	"So Long!"	Oshima Team K	"Yuuhi Marie"
2013	31	"Sayonara Crawl"	Under Girls	"Bara no Kajitsu"
2013	31	"Sayonara Crawl"	Team K	"How come?"
2013	32	"Koisuru Fortune Cookie"	Next Girls	"Kondokoso Ecstasy"
2013	33	"Heart Electric"	Undergirls	"Kaisoku to Doutai Shiryoku"
2013	33	"Heart Electric"	Team K	"Sasameyuki Regret"
2013	34	"Suzukake no Ki no Michi de "Kimi no Hohoemi o Yume ni Miru" to Itte Shimattara Bokutachi no Kankei wa Dō Kawatte Shimau no ka, Bokunari ni Nannichi ka Kangaeta Ue de no Yaya Kihazukashii Ketsuron no Yō na Mono"		"Mosh & Dive"
2014	35	"Mae shika Mukanee"	Beauty Giraffes	"Kimi no Uso wo Shitteita"
2014	36	"Labrador Retriever"	Team A	"Kimi wa Kimagure"
2014	37	"Kokoro no Placard"	Undergirls	"Dareka ga Nageta Ball"
2014	38	"Kibouteki Refrain"	Senbatsu	"Kibouteki Refrain"
2014	38	"Kibouteki Refrain"	Team A	"Juujun na Slave"
2015	40	"Bokutachi wa Tatakawanai"	Senbatsu	"Bokutachi wa Tatakawanai"
2015	40	"Bokutachi wa Tatakawanai"	Selection 16	"Summer Side"
2015	41	"Halloween Night"	Senbatsu	"Halloween Night"
2015	42	"Kuchibiru ni Be My Baby"	Jisedai Senbatsu	"Kimi o Kimi o Kimi o..."
2015	42	"Kuchibiru ni Be My Baby"	Team K	"Onēsan no Hitorigoto"
2016	43	"Kimi wa Melody"	AKB48 Jisedai Senbatsu	"LALALA Message"
2016	44	"Tsubasa wa Iranai"	Senbatsu	"Tsubasa wa Iranai"
2016	44	"Tsubasa wa Iranai"	Team K	"Aishū no Trumpeter"
2016	45	"Love Trip / Shiawase o Wakenasai"	Senbatsu	"Love Trip / Shiawase o Wakenasai"
2016	46	"High Tension"	Waiting Circle	"Osaekirenai Shoudou"
2017	47	"Shoot Sign	Senbatsu	"Shoot Sign"
2017	48	"Negaigoto no Mochigusare"	Senbatsu	"Negaigoto no Mochigusare"
2017	48	"Negaigoto no Mochigusare"		"Tenmetsu Pheromone"
2018	52	Teacher Teacher	Team K	"Shuuden no Yoru"
2018	53	Sentimental Train	Senbatsu (Kami 7)	"Sentimental Train"
2018	54	NO WAY MAN	PRODUCE48 Senbatsu	"Wakariyasukute Gomen"
2019	55	Jiwaru DAYS		"Generation Change"
2019	56	Sustainable	Senbatsu	"Sustainable"
2020	57	"Shitsuren, Arigatō"	Senbatsu	"Shitsuren, Arigatō"
2020		"Hanarete Ite mo"		"Hanarete Ite mo"
2021	58	"Nemohamo Rumor"	Senbatsu	"Nemohamo Rumor"
2022	59	"Motokare Desu"	Senbatsu	"Motokare Desu"
2022	60	"Hisashiburi no Lip Gloss"	First Generation	"Unmei no Uta"

=== Albums with AKB48 ===
Koko ni Ita Koto

- "High school days" (Kenkyuusei)
- "Koko ni Ita Koto" (AKB48 + SKE48 + NMB48)

1830m

- "Lemon no Toshigoro"
- "Sakuranbo to Kodoku" (Kenkyuusei)
- "Aozora yo Sabishikunai Ka?" (AKB48 + SKE48 + NMB48 + HKT48)

Tsugi no Ashiato

- "Kyouhansha" (Team K)

Koko ga Rhodes da, Koko de Tobe!

- "Oh! Baby" (Team A)
- "Downtown Hotel 100 Goushitsu"

0 to 1 no Aida

- "Ai no Shisha" (Team K)
- "Hajimari no Yuki"

Thumbnail

- "Ano Hi no Jibun"
- "Subete wa Tochuu Keika"

== Appearances ==
=== Movies ===
- Lady Maiko (2014)
- Hiroshima Piano (2020), Nanako Eguchi
- Hoarder On The Border (2023)
- Zagin de Shisu!? (2024)

=== Dramas ===
- So long! Episode 2 (NTV, 2013)
- Majisuka Gakuen 4 (2015)
- Majisuka Gakuen 5 (2015)
- Kyabasuka Gakuen (2016)
- AKB Horror Night Adrenaline no Yoru (2015)
- AKB Love Night Koi Koujou (2016)

=== Survival show ===
- Produce 48 (2018)

=== Variety shows ===
- AKBINGO!
- Shukan AKB
- AKB48 no Anta, Dare?
- Bimyo-na Tobira AKB48 no GachiChallenge
- Ariyoshi AKB Kyowakoku
- AKB48 Konto "Nani mo Soko Made..."
- AKB48 Konto "Bimyo~"
- AKB48 SHOW!
- AKB Shirabe
- AKB Kousagi Dojo

=== Radio ===
- AKB48 no All Night Nippon
- Bayfm ON8+1
- AKB Radio Drama Gekijou
- LISTEN? ~Live 4 Life~
- LISTEN 2 to 3
- AKB48 Konya wa Kaeranai
- Recomen!
- Appare yattema-su!

=== Commercials ===
- Shinsei Bank Lake (Paripipo, Nandemo Share, Jiwajiwakuru Shiawase) (2015-2016)
- Breathe Right Web Campaign (2015-2016)
