= Idol Nanka Janakattara =

2023 single by AKB48

"Idol Nanka Janakkatara"
- Type A limited edition cover

Single by AKB48
- Language: Japanese
- B-side: "Shittakaburi no Sono Shita ni"; "Do the dance!"; "Zenryoku Hankōki"; "Kimi wa Boku wo Oboeterukana?"; "In any way"
- Released: September 27, 2023
- Genre: J-pop
- Length: 4:13
- Label: Universal Music Japan
- Composer: YSU
- Lyricist: Yasushi Akimoto
- Producer: Yasushi Akimoto

AKB48 singles chronology
"Dōshitemo Kimi ga Suki da" (2023)	"Idol Nanka Janakkatara" (2023)	"Colorcon Wink" (2024)

"Idol Nanka Janakattara" (Japanese: アイドルなんかじゃなかったら; lit. "If I weren't an idol") is a song by Japanese idol group AKB48. It was released as the group's 62nd single on September 27, 2023, through Universal Music Japan. Upon release, it topped the weekly Oricon chart and ranked fourth on the Billboard Japan Hot 100. Yui Oguri served as the lead singer and choreographic center for the single.

== Background and release ==
On July 28, 2023, the selected members were announced during a live broadcast on AKB48's official YouTube channel. Sixteen members were selected; Eriko Hashimoto was selected for the first time. Miu Shitao was selected for the first time in a year since "Hisashiburi no Lip Gloss". Yui Oguri served as the center for the second time, ten releases after "Teacher Teacher". Hitomi Honda announced her graduation on August 30, making "Idol Nanka Janakattara" her last single with the group. This is the final single to feature the teams A, K, B, and 4 before they disbanded in October.

Team S, who also choreographed "Dōshitemo Kimi ga Suki da", were in charge of choreography for the single.

The single was released in seven formats: Type A, Type B, Type C, first limited edition, regular edition, and Official Shop edition.

== Track listings ==
All lyrics are written by Yasushi Akimoto except for off vocal (instrumental) version tracks.

=== Type A ===
Type A (CD)
No.	Title	Music	Arrangement	Length
1.	"Idol Nanka Janakattara (アイドルなんかじゃなかったら; lit. 'If I Wasn't an Idol')"	YSU	APAZZI	4:13
2.	"Shittakaburi no Sono Shita ni (知ったかぶりのその下に; lit. 'Beneath the Pretense of Knowing')"	Masahiro Kawaura; Toshikazu.K	Tsutanaohiko	3:57
3.	"Do the dance!"	A-NOTE; S-TONE	A-NOTE; S-TONE	4:39
4.	"Idol Nanka Janakattara (off vocal ver.) (知ったかぶりのその下に (off vocal ver.))"	YSU	APAZZI	3:57
5.	"Shittakaburi no Sono Shita ni (off vocal ver.) (知ったかぶりのその下に (off vocal ver.))"	Masahiro Kawaura; Toshikazu.K	Tsutanaohiko	3:57
6.	"Do the dance! (off vocal ver.)"	A-NOTE; S-TONE	A-NOTE; S-TONE	4:37
Total length:				25:36

Type A (DVD)
No.	Title	Length
1.	"Dōshitemo Kimi ga Suki da / April 29, 2023 "AKB48 Spring Concert 2023 -Sukida! to Yobō-" (どうしても君が好きだ / 2023年4月29日「AKB48 春コンサート2023〜好きだ！と叫ぼう〜」)"
2.	"Netafuri / April 29, 2023 "AKB48 Spring Concert 2023 -Sukida! to Yobō-" (寝たふり / 2023年4月29日「AKB48 春コンサート2023〜好きだ！と叫ぼう〜」)"
3.	"Sayonarajanai / April 30, 2023 "AKB48 Team 8 Spring Final Festival 9 Years of Miracles Night Section" (サヨナラじゃない / 2023年4月30日「AKB48チーム8 春の総決算祭り 9年間のキセキ 夜の部」)"
4.	"Da Re Da / April 29, 2023 "AKB48 Spring Concert 2023 -Sukida! to Yobō-" (Da Re Da / 2023年4月29日「AKB48 春コンサート2023〜好きだ！と叫ぼう〜」)"

=== Type B ===
Type B (CD)
No.	Title	Music	Arrangement	Length
1.	"Idol Nanka Janakattara (アイドルなんかじゃなかったら; lit. 'If I Wasn't an Idol')"	YSU	APAZZI	4:13
2.	"Shittakaburi no Sono Shita ni (知ったかぶりのその下に; lit. 'Beneath the Pretense of Knowing')"	Masahiro Kawaura; Toshikazu.K	Tsutanaohiko	3:57
3.	"Zenryoku Hankōki (全力反抗期; lit. 'Full-On Rebellious Period')"	Nobuyuki Nakatani	Nobuyuki Nakatani	4:59
4.	"Idol Nanka Janakattara (off vocal ver.) (知ったかぶりのその下に (off vocal ver.))"	YSU	APAZZI	3:57
5.	"Shittakaburi no Sono Shita ni (off vocal ver.) (知ったかぶりのその下に (off vocal ver.))"	Masahiro Kawaura; Toshikazu.K	Tsutanaohiko	3:57
6.	"Zenryoku Hankōki (off vocal ver.) (全力反抗期 (off vocal ver.))"	Nobuyuki Nakatani	Nobuyuki Nakatani	4:58
Total length:				26:17

Type B (DVD)
No.	Title	Length
1.	"Dōshitemo Kimi ga Suki da / April 29, 2023 "AKB48 Spring Concert 2023 -Sukida! to Yobō-" (どうしても君が好きだ / 2023年4月29日「AKB48 春コンサート2023〜好きだ！と叫ぼう〜」)"
2.	"Netafuri / April 29, 2023 "AKB48 Spring Concert 2023 -Sukida! to Yobō-" (寝たふり / 2023年4月29日「AKB48 春コンサート2023〜好きだ！と叫ぼう〜」)"
3.	"Ano Natsu no Bōhatei / April 29, 2023 "AKB48 Spring Concert 2023 -Sukida! to Yobō-" (あの夏の防波堤 / 2023年4月29日「AKB48 春コンサート2023〜好きだ！と叫ぼう〜」)"
4.	"Da Re Da / April 29, 2023 "AKB48 Spring Concert 2023 -Sukida! to Yobō-" (Da Re Da / 2023年4月29日「AKB48 春コンサート2023〜好きだ！と叫ぼう〜」)"

=== Type C ===
Type C (CD)
No.	Title	Music	Arrangement	Length
1.	"Idol Nanka Janakattara (アイドルなんかじゃなかったら; lit. 'If I Wasn't an Idol')"	YSU	APAZZI	4:13
2.	"Shittakaburi no Sono Shita ni (知ったかぶりのその下に; lit. 'Beneath the Pretense of Knowing')"	Masahiro Kawaura; Toshikazu.K	Tsutanaohiko	3:57
3.	"Kimi wa Boku wo Oboeterukana? (君は僕を覚えてるかな?; lit. 'Do You Remember Me?')"	Tomonori Inoue	Main Kushita	4:20
4.	"Idol Nanka Janakattara (off vocal ver.) (知ったかぶりのその下に (off vocal ver.))"	YSU	APAZZI	3:57
5.	"Shittakaburi no Sono Shita ni (off vocal ver.) (知ったかぶりのその下に (off vocal ver.))"	Masahiro Kawaura; Toshikazu.K	Tsutanaohiko	3:57
6.	"Kimi wa Boku wo Oboeterukana? (off vocal ver.) (君は僕を覚えてるかな? (off vocal ver.))"	Tomonori Inoue	Main Kushita	4:18
Total length:				24:58

Type C (DVD)
No.	Title	Length
1.	"Dōshitemo Kimi ga Suki da / April 29, 2023 "AKB48 Spring Concert 2023 -Sukida! to Yobō-" (どうしても君が好きだ / 2023年4月29日「AKB48 春コンサート2023〜好きだ！と叫ぼう〜」)"
2.	"Netafuri / April 29, 2023 "AKB48 Spring Concert 2023 -Sukida! to Yobō-" (寝たふり / 2023年4月29日「AKB48 春コンサート2023〜好きだ！と叫ぼう〜」)"
3.	"Wonderland / April 29, 2023 "AKB48 Spring Concert 2023 -Sukida! to Yobō-" (Wonderland / 2023年4月29日「AKB48 春コンサート2023〜好きだ！と叫ぼう〜」)"
4.	"Da Re Da / April 29, 2023 "AKB48 Spring Concert 2023 -Sukida! to Yobō-" (Da Re Da / 2023年4月29日「AKB48 春コンサート2023〜好きだ！と叫ぼう〜」)"

=== Official Shop edition ===
Official Shop edition
No.	Title	Music	Arrangement	Length
1.	"Idol Nanka Janakattara (アイドルなんかじゃなかったら; lit. 'If I Wasn't an Idol')"	YSU	APAZZI	4:13
2.	"Shittakaburi no Sono Shita ni (知ったかぶりのその下に; lit. 'Beneath the Pretense of Knowing')"	Masahiro Kawaura; Toshikazu.K	Tsutanaohiko	3:57
3.	"In any way"	Kenta Urashima; TETTA	TETTA	3:40
4.	"Idol Nanka Janakattara (off vocal ver.) (知ったかぶりのその下に (off vocal ver.))"	YSU	APAZZI	3:57
5.	"Shittakaburi no Sono Shita ni (off vocal ver.) (知ったかぶりのその下に (off vocal ver.))"	Masahiro Kawaura; Toshikazu.K	Tsutanaohiko	3:57
6.	"In any way (off vocal ver.)"	Kenta Urashima; TETTA	TETTA	3:38
Total length:				23:38

== Participating members ==
=== "Idol Nanka Janakattara" ===
"Idol Nanka Janakattara" ("アイドルなんかじゃなかったら") performed by selection senbatsu performers, consisting of:

- Team A: Erii Chiba, Hitomi Honda, Mion Mukaichi, Rin Okabe
- Team K: Erina Oda, Momoka Onishi, Mizuki Yamauchi
- Team B: Yuki Kashiwagi, Yui Oguri, Maho Omori
- Team 4: Narumi Kuranō, Yuiri Murayama, Miu Shitao
- Trainees: Eriko Hashimoto, Airi Satō, Sora Yamazaki

== Charts ==
Weekly chart position for "Idol Nanka Janakattara"
Chart (2023)	Peak position
Japan (Japan Hot 100)	4
Japan (Oricon)	1
Japan Combined Singles (Oricon)	1

== Certifications ==
Certifications for "Idol Nanka Janakattara"
Region	Certification	Certified units/sales
Japan (RIAJ)	3× Platinum	750,000^{^}
^{^} Shipments figures based on certification alone.
