= Nemohamo Rumor =

2021 single by AKB48

- Regular Type-B cover

Single by AKB48
- B-side: "Hanarete Ite mo"; "Ōsawagi Tengoku" (Type-A); "Seikōtōtei" (Type-B); "Kimi ga Inaku Naru 12gatsu" (Type-C); "Black Jaguar" (Theater Edition)
- Released: September 29, 2021
- Recorded: 2020–2021
- Genre: J-pop
- Label: King Records
- Lyricist: Yasushi Akimoto

AKB48 singles chronology
"Shitsuren, Arigatō" (2020)	"Nemohamo Rumor" (2021)	"Motokare Desu" (2022)

Music videos
- "Nemohamo Rumor" (根も葉もRumor) on YouTube
- "Kimi ga Inaku Naru 12gatsu" (君がいなくなる12月) on YouTube

"Nemohamo Rumor" (Japanese: 根も葉もRumor (ねもはもルーマー）, romanized: Nemohamo Rūmā, lit. 'Groundless Rumor') is the 58th single by Japanese idol girl group AKB48. It was released on September 29, 2021. Member Nana Okada served as both lead singer and choreographic center.

== Background and release ==
It was released a year and a half (560 days) after, "Shitsuren, Arigatō" and was marketed as the first single in which only AKB48 members participated since 2010's "Chance no Junban". The single was released in seven physical editions, comprising both regular and limited editions of Type A, Type B, and Type C, and a theater version. The single's release was first announced at the group's 15th anniversary on May 23, 2021 at Pia Arena MM. The groupmembers who would participate in the A-side track were announced on July 7, 2021.

This marked the last single for member Yui Yokoyama, the first single in which Hitomi Honda participated after returning from Iz*One, and the first single released after Minami Minegishi's graduation. Nana Okada returned to the center position for the first time since Jabaja in 2018.

"Nemohamo Rumor" was first performed on the TBS program "THE MUSIC DAY 2021" on July 17, 2021. During Yuki Kashiwagi's hiatus for health reasons, her choreography was performed by Erina Oda. The choreography is in a locking style and was choreographed by Jun Kandabashi, the dance teacher of the Mie High School dance club "Serious Flavor", who also appears in the music video.

=== B-sides ===
"Hanarete Ite mo" (離れていても; Even When We're Apart) was first released in 2020 as a charity single performed by all the group's current members and some of the notable graduates, but was later credited to the senbatsu members from the single Shitsuren, Arigatō and graduates only. Every active member in the group participated in either the A-side or one of the B-sides.

== Track list ==
All the lyrics were written by Yasushi Akimoto.

=== Type A ===
Type A was released in regular and limited-edition version, with different covers but the same track list.

Type-A - CD
No.	Title	Music	Arrangement	Length
1.	"Nemohamo Rumor" (根も葉もRumor)
2.	"Hanarete Ite mo" (離れていても)	Jun Aiba	Nonaka "Masa" Yuichi
3.	"Ōsawagi Tengoku" (大騒ぎ天国)
4.	"Nemohamo Rumor" (off vocal version)
5.	"Hanarete Ite mo" (off vocal version)	Jun Aiba	Nonaka "Masa" Yuichi
6.	"Ōsawagi Tengoku" (off vocal version)

Type-A – DVD
No.	Title	Director(s)	Length
1.	"Nemohamo Rumor" (music video)	Yoshi Tomohisa
2.	"Nemohamo Rumor" (dance version)	Yoshi Tomohisa
3.	"Hanarete Ite mo" (music video)	Dai Isomi

=== Type B ===
Type B was released in regular and limited-edition version, with different covers but the same track list.

Type-B - CD
No.	Title	Music	Arrangement	Length
1.	"Nemohamo Rumor" (根も葉もRumor)
2.	"Hanarete Ite mo" (離れていても)	Jun Aiba	Nonaka "Masa" Yuichi
3.	"Seikōtōtei" (西高東低)
4.	"Nemohamo Rumor" (off vocal version)
5.	"Hanarete Ite mo" (off vocal version)	Jun Aiba	Nonaka "Masa" Yuichi
6.	"Seikōtōtei" (off vocal version)

Type-B – DVD
No.	Title	Director(s)	Length
1.	"Nemohamo Rumor" (music video)	Yoshi Tomohisa
2.	"Nemohamo Rumor" (dance version)	Yoshi Tomohisa
3.	"Hanarete Ite mo" (music video)	Dai Isomi

=== Type C ===
Type C was released in regular and limited-edition version, with different covers but the same track list.

Type-C - CD
No.	Title	Music	Arrangement	Length
1.	"Nemohamo Rumor" (根も葉もRumor)
2.	"Hanarete Ite mo" (離れていても)	Jun Aiba	Nonaka "Masa" Yuichi
3.	"Kimi ga Inaku Naru 12gatsu" (君がいなくなる12月)	Kenta Urashima, Takumi Yamamoto	Takumi Yamamoto
4.	"Nemohamo Rumor" (off vocal version)
5.	"Hanarete Ite mo" (off vocal version)	Jun Aiba	Nonaka "Masa" Yuichi
6.	"Kimi ga Inaku Naru 12gatsu" (off vocal version)	Kenta Urashima, Takumi Yamamoto	Takumi Yamamoto

Type-C – DVD
No.	Title	Director(s)	Length
1.	"Nemohamo Rumor" (music video)	Yoshi Tomohisa
2.	"Nemohamo Rumor" (dance version)	Yoshi Tomohisa
3.	"Kimi ga Inaku Naru 12gatsu" (music video)	Yui Yokoyama

=== Theater edition ===
Theater edition - CD
No.	Title	Music	Arrangement	Length
1.	"Nemohamo Rumor" (根も葉もRumor)
2.	"Hanarete Ite mo" (離れていても)	Jun Aiba	Nonaka "Masa" Yuichi
3.	"Black Jaguar" (ブラックジャガー)
4.	"Nemohamo Rumor" (off vocal version)
5.	"Hanarete Ite mo" (off vocal version)	Jun Aiba	Nonaka "Masa" Yuichi
6.	"Black Jaguar" (off vocal version)

== Participating members ==
=== "Nemohamo Rumor" ===
"根も葉もRumor" ("Nemohamo Rumor") performed by selected senbatsu members, consisting of:

- Team A: Erī Chiba, Mion Mukaichi, Rei Nishikawa, Yui Yokoyama
- Team K: Tomu Muto
- Team B: Yuki Kashiwagi, Megu Taniguchi, Satone Kubo
- Team 4: Nana Okada, Mizuki Yamauchi, Yuiri Murayama
- Team 8: Hitomi Honda, Momoka Onishi, Miu Shitao, Narumi Kuranoo, Rin Okabe, Yui Oguri, Yui Yokoyama

=== "Hanarete Ite mo" ===
"Hanarete Ite mo" (離れていても; Even When We're Apart) performed by selected senbatsu and graduate members, consisting of:

- Team A: Mion Mukaichi, Yui Yokoyama
- Team K: Tomu Muto
- Team B: Yuki Kashiwagi, Satone Kubo, Seina Fukuoka
- Team 4: Nana Okada, Mizuki Yamauchi, Yuiri Murayama
- Team 8: Rin Okabe, Yui Oguri
- Graduates: Atsuko Maeda, Haruna Kojima, Jurina Matsui, Mariko Shinoda, Minami Minegishi, Minami Takahashi, Rino Sashihara, Sayaka Yamamoto, Tomomi Itano, Yuko Oshima

=== "Ōsawagi Tengoku" ===
"Ōsawagi Tengoku" (大騒ぎ天国; Uproar Paradise), performed by selected Second Generation members, consisting of:

- Team A: Erī Chiba, Kurumi Suzuki, Manaka Taguchi, Minami Satō, Nazuna Furukawa, Rei Nishikawa, Saki Michieda, Suzuha Yamane
- Team K: Ayami Nagatomo, Kana Yasuda, Megumi Nagano, Orin Muto, Ran Kobayashi, Rina Okada
- Team B: Ayu Yamabe, Haruna Saito, Hitomi Otake, Maho Omori, Satone Kubo
- Team 4: Haruka Kurosu, Kyoka Tada, Kaori Inagaki, Ma Chia-ling, Mai Homma, Mizuki Yamauchi, Miyū Kuramoto, Nanami Asai, Sena Ishiwata, Yuzuka Yoshihashi

=== "Seikōtōtei" ===
"Seikōtōtei" (西高東低; High Pressure in the West and Low in the East), performed by Team 8, consisting of: Mitsuho Fukutomo, Yurina Gyoten, Hiyuka Sakagawa, Sayūna Hama, Yuki Harumoto, Haruna Hashimoto, Yūna Hattori, Ayaka Hidaritomo, Hikaru Hirano, Hitomi Honda, Misaki Kawahara, Narumi Kuranoo, Mashiro Mitomo, Serika Nagano, Erina Oda, Yūi Oguri, Rin Okabe, Hinako Okuhara, Hinano Okumoto, Nagisa Sakaguchi, Maria Shimizu, Miu Shitao, Yūka Suzuki, Ayane Takahashi, Sayaka Takahashi, Kaoru Takaoka, Remi Tokunaga, Sorano Uemi, Hatsuka Utada, Kyoka Yamada, Yui Yokoyama, Karen Yoshida, Nanase Yoshikawa, Momoka Ōnishi

=== "Kimi ga Inaku Naru Juunigatsu" ===
"君がいなくなる12月" ("Kimi ga Inaku Naru Juunigatsu"; "December When You Leave") performed by Yui Yokoyama

=== "Black Jaguar" ===
"ブラックジャガー" ("Black Jaguar") performed by selected First Generation performers, consisting of:

- Team A: Anna Iriyama, Ayana Shinozaki, Miho Miyazaki, Rena Kato
- Team K: Ami Yumoto, Haruka Komiyama, Hinana Shimoguchi, Manami Ichikawa, Shinobu Mogi
- Team B: Chiyori Nakanishi, Kayoko Takita, Saho Iwatate, Saki Kitazawa, Seina Fukuoka, Shizuka Ōya, Yukari Sasaki
- Team 4: Kiara Satō, Miyū Omori

== Charts ==
=== Weekly charts ===
Weekly chart performance for "Nemohamo Rumor"
Chart (2021)	Peak position
Japan (Japan Hot 100)	1
Japan (Oricon)	1

=== Year-end charts ===
2021 year-end chart performance for "Nemohamo Rumor"
Chart (2021)	Position
Japan (Oricon)	19

2022 year-end chart performance for "Nemohamo Rumor"
Chart (2022)	Position
Japan (Oricon)	96

== Certifications ==
Certifications for "Nemohamo Rumor"
Region	Certification	Certified units/sales
Japan (RIAJ)	2× Platinum	500,000^{^}
^{^} Shipments figures based on certification alone.

== Release history ==
Release dates and formats for "Nemohamo Rumor"
Country	Date	Format	Version	Catalog number	Label	Ref.
Various	September 22, 2021	Digital download; streaming	All version	—N/a	You, Be Cool!; King	
Japan	September 29, 2021	CD+DVD	Type-A	KIZM-90697～8 (Limited), KIZM-697～8 (Regular)	You, Be Cool!; King	
Japan	September 29, 2021	CD+DVD	Type-B	KIZM-90699～700 (Limited), KIZM-699～700 (Regular)	You, Be Cool!; King	
Japan	September 29, 2021	CD+DVD	Type-C	KIZM-90701～2 (Limited), KIZM-701～2 (Regular)	You, Be Cool!; King	
Japan	September 29, 2021	CD	Theater	NMAX-1372	You, Be Cool!; King	
