= Manaka Taguchi =

Japanese singer

- 田口 愛佳
- Born: December 12, 2003 (age 22); Kanagawa Prefecture, Japan
- Years active: 2016–present
- Musical career
- Genres: J-pop
- Instrument: Vocals
- Formerly of: AKB48

Manaka Taguchi (田口 愛佳, Taguchi Manaka; born December 12, 2003 in Kanagawa Prefecture) is a Japanese singer. She is a former member of the Japanese idol girl group AKB48.

== Career ==
Taguchi joined the Japanese idol group AKB48 as a 16th generation trainee. In December 2017, she became a regular member.

Her first selection for AKB48's main performance group came in May, 2022, when she was selected for AKB48's 59th single "Motokare Desu".

== Filmography ==
=== Television ===
Year	Title	Role	Notes	Ref.
2024	Stardust Telepath			

=== Stage play ===
Year	Title	Role	Notes	Ref.
2023	Odd Taxi: Diamond wa Kizutsukanai	Ichimura Shiho		

=== Web drama ===
Year	Title	Role	Notes	Ref.
2023	Sentika F8ABA6 Jisariz	Ayuka		
