= Motokare Desu =

2022 single by AKB48

- Theater edition cover (Note: There was nine different cover used for this single. For digital distribution, the group use Theater edition cover with addition "Special Edition" text.)

Single by AKB48
- B-side: "Kowasanakya Ikenai Mono"; "Okubyō na Namake Mono" (Type-A); "Loss of Time" (Type-B); "Yarakasou" (Type-C); "Angie" (Theater Edition)
- Released: May 18, 2022
- Recorded: 2022
- Studio: ZeeQ
- Genre: J-pop; rock ballad
- Length: 3:48
- Label: King Records
- Lyricist: Yasushi Akimoto

AKB48 singles chronology
"Nemohamo Rumor" (2021)	"Motokare Desu" (2022)	"Hisashiburi no Lip Gloss" (2022)

Music videos
- "Motokare Desu" (元カレです) on YouTube
- "Motokare Desu" (元カレです) Dance ver. on YouTube
- "Kowasanakya Ikenai Mono" (壊さなくちゃいけないもの) on YouTube

"Motokare Desu" (Japanese: 元カレです, romanized: Motokare Desu, lit. 'My Ex-Boyfriend') is the 59th single by Japanese idol girl group AKB48. It was released on May 18, 2022. Member Hitomi Honda served as both lead singer and choreographic center.

"Motokare Desu" managed to top Oricon chart, the group 46th consecutive No.1 ranking since "River" in 2009.

== Background and release ==
On February 22 midnight, during their TV Tokyo's "AKB48, Saikin Kiita? ~Issho ni Nanka Yatte Mimasen ka?" program, it was announced that the group would release their 59th single on May 18 with 20 AKB-only participating members for A-track. Hitomi Honda would take the center position for the first time after her departure from Iz*One. In the next morning on February 23, TV Tokyo Music Festival broadcasting live their music video on shot.

On March 28, the single title was first revealed and performed for the first time at TBS broadcasting program "CDTV LIVE! LIVE!". It was also revealed that "Motokare Desu" was choreographed by Ganmi who also made the choreography for BTS's "Butter".

On April 3, during their commemorative concert "AKB48 LIVE SHOW ~AKBINGO! The Final Goodbye Mr. Mouri~" the group performed the song for the first time in front of fans audience. Later it was also informed that this single would have Team song and member Nana Okada solo song as B-side.

On April 18, the music video for "Motokare Desu" was announced that it was set to be released on April 20 along with the dance version of "Motokare Desu" as well. On the next day at midnight, pre-release single of "Motokare Desu" out digitally prior music video release.

On April 30, B-side title was announced through the group's official Showroom channel. Each B-side title also previewed for the first time as well. It was also announced that Nana Okada's solo song would have its music video. It was her reward for winning the competition of "AKB48 Group Fourth Singing Contest".

== Promotion and live performance ==
The group collaborating with ABC-Mart and New Balance showcasing the group specialized dance performances. The group also collaborating with YouTube Music showing the snippet of "Motokare Desu" music video at Shibuya Crossing. To attract more public audience, short video of Motokare Desu featured a solo of 20 participating members showed at Shinagawa Station. Prior release date, several retailer hold a limited campaign for fans. Tower Records, Tsutaya Records, and HMV would release a special poster for a specific circumstances, while Amazon Japan would giving a solo autographed postcard. All of retail campaign only to feature member Hitomi Honda, Mion Mukaichi, and Yuiri Murayama.

In addition to promote the single, the group made many appearances on radio and television including TV Asahi's Music Station on May 13, TBS's CDTV LIVE! LIVE! for a second time on May 16, NHK's Utacon on May 17, Nippon TV's Buzz Rhythm 02 on May 20, TV Tokyo's Premium MelodiX! on May 23, and Fuji TV's Music Fair on May 28.

== Receptions and commercial performance ==
"Motokare Desu" was described as a dance-oriented performances with K-pop influences, hence the return of Hitomi Honda from South Korean-Japanese girl group, Iz*One. Her first ever center position was praised for great influence for the group complicated dance performance.

The single sold 288,562 copies on release day and topping the daily chart of Oricon. Based on Billboard Japan, "Motokare Desu" managed to sold 382,356 copies for first-day release and topping the single sales for the period of May, 16 - May, 18.

This single is also charted in South Korea. On Bugs J-pop chart, pre-release of "Motokare Desu" is debuting at 66th on April 24 and reached it is highest peak at 58th on May 8. At same chart, Special Edition release of "Motokare Desu" is debuting at 2 along with "Kowasanakya Ikenai Mono" at 40th, "Okubyō na Namake Mono" at 41th, and "Angie" at 58th on release day.

== Music video ==
Prior the release of music video, preview from music video set was first revealed in the morning of April 20. Later at the evening of 8 p.m JST, music video of "Motokare Desu" premiered at YouTube. It was directed by Minoru Fujimoto who also participated in LED works at 2020 Tokyo Paralympics opening ceremony. The music video showing variety technology of LED performance such as LED pole who will changing shapes imitating the members hand gestures and so on. Later revealed it took two days to filming the music videos.

On May 10, music video for B-side "Kowasanakya Ikenai Mono" was released on YouTube. It was directed by Toshitsugu Ohno who previously directed Twice's "Stuck in My Head", STU48's "Omoidasete Yokatta" and many more.

== Artwork and packaging ==
Regular (first top row) and Limited cover for Motokare Desu. From L-R: Type-A, Type-B, Type-C.

"Motokare Desu" released in four different version with different artwork issues as well, the version are Type-A, Type-B, Type-C and Theater edition. Each version except Theater edition released in Regular and Limited version. Pre-release version which out digitally also issuing different artworks. For digital distribution, Motokare Desu was issued as Special Edition which contain all songs from every version minus off-vocal (instrumental). Special Edition of Motokare Desu use Theater edition artwork with addition "Special Edition" text. Thus in total, "Motokare Desu" issuing nine different artworks.

The artworks was released on April 20 prior music videos release. The Theater version cover is Hitomi Honda's first ever solo cover of AKB48 discography.

All versions of Motokare Desu except Theater edition contain CD, DVD, and lyric booklet. The content of lyric booklet are different depending the version. The package also contain a random postcard-size photo of 20 participating members. For regular version the photos are taken inside music video set and limited version was taken outside the set. Tower Records release a special postcard-size photo that was taken during cover art shoot. A two shot photo from specific members also released for specific retailer: Tower Records for a two shot of Hitomi Honda and Yui Oguri, HMV for Hitomi Honda and Mizuki Yamauchi, Shinseido - WonderGoo for Yuki Kashiwagi and Erī Chiba, Tsutaya Records for Nana Okada and Yuiri Murayama, Yodobashi for Okabe Rin and Hitomi Honda, Guruguruking for Okada Nana and Manaka Taguchi, Amazon Japan for Yui Oguri and Mizuki Yamauchi, Rakuten Books for Kashiwagi Yuki and Mion Mukaichi, 7net for Narumi Kuranō and Nagisa Sakaguchi, Neowing for Miu Shitao and Mizuki Yamauchi, Lammtarra for Megu Taniguchi and Yuiri Murayama, Joshin for Momoka Onishi and Megu Taniguchi, Coach and four Store for Nagisa Sakaguchi and Seina Fukuoka, Bic Camera for Narumi Kuranō and Tomu Muto, Gyokkodo Inc. for Yui Oguri and Erina Oda, AKB48 shop for Nanami Asai and Seina Fukuoka, lastly King E-shop for Momoka Onishi and Maho Omori.

== Track listing ==
All lyrics are written by Yasushi Akimoto except off-vocal (instrumental) version tracks.

=== Type-A ===
Type-A - CD
No.	Title	Music	Arrangement	Length
1.	"Motokare Desu" (元カレです)	Satori Shiraishi	Shiraishi	3:48
2.	"Kowasanakya Ikenai Mono" (壊さなくちゃいけないもの)	Keisuke Yamada	Nonaka "Masa" Yuichi	4:58
3.	"Okubyō na Namake Mono" (臆病なナマケモノ)	Shuho Mitani	Mitani	4:45
4.	"Motokare Desu" (off vocal version)	Shiraishi	Shiraishi	3:48
5.	"Kowasanakya Ikenai Mono" (off vocal version)	Yamada	"Masa"	4:58
6.	"Okubyō na Namake Mono" (off vocal version)	Mitani	Mitani	4:44
Total length:				27:01

Type-A – DVD
No.	Title	Director(s)	Length
1.	"Motokare Desu" (Music video)	Minoru Fujimoto
2.	"Motokare Desu" (Dance version)	Fujimoto
3.	"Kowasanakya Ikenai Mono" (Music video)	Toshitsugu Ohno

=== Type-B ===
Type-B - CD
No.	Title	Music	Arrangement	Length
1.	"Motokare Desu" (元カレです)	Satori Shiraishi	Shiraishi	3:48
2.	"Kowasanakya Ikenai Mono" (壊さなくちゃいけないもの)	Keisuke Yamada	Nonaka "Masa" Yuichi	4:58
3.	"Loss of Time"	Chocolate Mix	APAZZI	3:44
4.	"Motokare Desu" (off vocal version)	Shiraishi	Shiraishi	3:48
5.	"Kowasanakya Ikenai Mono" (off vocal version)	Yamada	"Masa"	4:58
6.	"Loss of Time" (off vocal version)	Chocolate Mix	APAZZI	3:44
Total length:				25:00

Type-B – DVD
No.	Title	Director(s)	Length
1.	"Motokare Desu" (Music video)	Minoru Fujimoto
2.	"Motokare Desu" (Dance version)	Fujimoto
3.	"Kowasanakya Ikenai Mono" (Music video)	Toshitsugu Ohno

=== Type C ===
Type-C - CD
No.	Title	Music	Arrangement	Length
1.	"Motokare Desu" (元カレです)	Satori Shiraishi	Shiraishi	3:48
2.	"Kowasanakya Ikenai Mono" (壊さなくちゃいけないもの)	Keisuke Yamada	Nonaka "Masa" Yuichi	4:58
3.	"Yarakasou" (ヤラカソウ)	Kenta Urashima, Miki Arashi, Yūki Katō	Katō	4:36
4.	"Motokare Desu" (off vocal version)	Shiraishi	Shiraishi	3:48
5.	"Kowasanakya Ikenai Mono" (off vocal version)	Yamada	"Masa"	4:58
6.	"Yarakasou" (off vocal version)	Urashima, Arashi, Katō	Katō	4:36
Total length:				26:44

Type-C – DVD
No.	Title	Director(s)	Length
1.	"Motokare Desu" (Music video)	Minoru Fujimoto
2.	"Motokare Desu" (Dance version)	Fujimoto
3.	"Kowasanakya Ikenai Mono" (Music video)	Toshitsugu Ohno

=== Theatrical edition ===
CD
No.	Title	Music	Arrangement	Length
1.	"Motokare Desu" (元カレです)	Satori Shiraishi	Shiraishi	3:48
2.	"Kowasanakya Ikenai Mono" (壊さなくちゃいけないもの)	Keisuke Yamada	Nonaka "Masa" Yuichi	4:58
3.	"Angie" (アンジー)	Mayu Miyazaki	Takahashi Shūhei	4:35
4.	"Motokare Desu" (off vocal version)	Shiraishi	Shiraishi	3:48
5.	"Kowasanakya Ikenai Mono" (off vocal version)	Yamada	"Masa"	4:58
6.	"Angie" (off vocal version)	Miyazaki	Shūhei	4:35
Total length:				26:42

=== Notes ===
- Loss of Time (Type-B) stylized as Loss of time.

== Participating members ==
=== "Motokare Desu" ===
"元カレです" ("Motokare Desu") performed by selection senbatsu performers, consisting of:

- Team A: Erī Chiba, Mion Mukaichi, Nana Okada, Seina Fukuoka
- Team K: Manaka Taguchi, Mizuki Yamauchi, Tomu Muto
- Team B: Nanami Asai, Yuki Kashiwagi, Maho Omori
- Team 4: Megu Taniguchi, Yuiri Murayama
- Team 8: Hitomi Honda, Erina Oda, Momoka Onishi, Miu Shitao, Nagisa Sakaguchi, Narumi Kuranō, Rin Okabe, Yui Oguri

=== "Kowasanakya Ikenai Mono" ===
"Kowasanakya Ikenai Mono" (壊さなくちゃいけないもの) lit. 'Things that need to be destroyed' performed by Nana Okada.

=== "Okubyō na Namake Mono" ===
"Okubyō na Namake Mono" (臆病なナマケモノ) lit. 'Timid Sloth' performed by AKB48's Team A, consisting of: Chiyori Nakanishi, Ma Chia-ling, Erī Chiba, Haruka Komiyama, Haruna Saito, Hitomi Honda, Hitomi Otake, Maria Shimizu, Mashiro Mitomo, Mion Mukaichi, Nana Okada, Orin Muto, Rin Okabe, Saho Iwatate, Saki Michieda, Sayaka Takahashi, Seina Fukuoka, Serika Nagano, Yuzuka Yoshinashi.

=== "Loss of Time" ===
"Loss of Time" performed by AKB48's Team K, consisting of: Ami Yumoto, Ayane Takahashi, Ayu Yamabe, Erina Oda, Hinako Okuhara, Hinana Shimoguchi, Manaka Taguchi, Manami Ichikawa, Mizuki Yamauchi, Momoka Onishi, Ran Kobayashi, Sayuna Hama, Shinobu Mogi, Sorano Uemi, Suzuha Yamane, Tomu Muto, Yuna Hattori.

=== "Yarakasou" ===
"Yarakasou" (ヤラカソウ) lit. 'Cheerful' performed by AKB48's Team B, consisting of: Ayaka Hidaritomo, Ayana Shinozaki, Haruna Hashimoto, Hikaru Hirano, Mitsuho Fukutome, Kurumi Suzuki, Kyoka Yamada, Maho Omori, Megumi Nagano, Minami Sato, Nagisa Sakaguchi, Nanami Asahi, Rei Fujizono, Remi Tokunaga, Saki Kitazawa, Sena Ishiwata, Kaori Inagaki, Yui Oguri, Yuki Kashiwagi.

=== "Angie" ===
"Angie" (アンジー) performed by AKB48's Team 4, consisting of: Ayami Nagatomo, Haruka Kurosu, Hatsuka Utada, Hiyuka Sakagawa, Kaoru Takaoka, Karen Yoshida, Kiara Sato, Kyoka Tada, Megu Taniguchi, Misaki Kawahara, Miu Shitao, Miyū Omori, Narumi Kuranō, Nanase Yoshikawa, Rina Okada, Yuiri Murayama, Yukari Sasaki, Yurina Gyoten.

== Charts ==
=== Weekly charts ===
Weekly chart performance for "Motokare Desu"
Chart (2022)	Peak position
Japan (Japan Hot 100)	3
Japan (Oricon)	1

=== Year-end charts ===
Year-end chart performance for "Motokare Desu"
Chart (2022)	Position
Japan (Oricon)	21

== Certifications and sales ==
Certifications for "Motokare Desu"
Region	Certification	Certified units/sales
Japan (RIAJ)	2× Platinum	500,000^{^}
^{^} Shipments figures based on certification alone.

Sales for "Motokare Desu"
Country	Sales	Ref.
Japan (Oricon)	325,779 (Note: This figure is based Oricon weekly and daily single ranking from May 18, 2022. Figure is still updating as June 8, 2022.)	
Japan (Billboard/SoundScan)	535,403 (Note: Billboard Japan sales figures are from the top 50 only. Exact sales figures are not available as Billboard Japan does not count sales below the top 50. Figure is still updating as August 28, 2022.)	

== Release history ==
Release dates and formats for "Motokare Desu"
Country	Date	Format	Version	Catalog number	Label	Ref.
South Korea	April 20, 2022	Digital download; streaming	Pre-release	—N/a	C&L Music; KING RECORDS	
Various	April 20, 2022	Digital download; streaming	Pre-release	NOPA-3211	You, Be Cool!; KING RECORDS	
South Korea	May 18, 2022	Digital download; streaming	Special Edition	—N/a	C&L Music; KING RECORDS	
Various	May 18, 2022	Digital download; streaming	Special Edition	NOPA-3307	You, Be Cool!; KING RECORDS	
Japan	May 18, 2022	CD+DVD	Type-A	KIZM-90725～6 (Limited), KIZM-725～6 (Regular)	You, Be Cool!; KING RECORDS	
Japan	May 18, 2022	CD+DVD	Type-B	KIZM-90727～8 (Limited), KIZM-727～8 (Regular)	You, Be Cool!; KING RECORDS	
Japan	May 18, 2022	CD+DVD	Type-C	KIZM-90729～30 (Limited), KIZM-729～30 (Regular)	You, Be Cool!; KING RECORDS	
Japan	May 18, 2022	CD	Theater	NMAX-1385	You, Be Cool!; KING RECORDS	
