= Dōshitemo Kimi ga Suki da =

- Type A limited edition cover

Single by AKB48
- B-side: "Neta Furi"; "Sayonara Janai" (Type-A); "Wonderland" (Type-B); "Ano Natsu no Bohatei" (Type-C); "Da Re Da" (Official Shop Edition)
- Released: April 26, 2023
- Recorded: 2023
- Genre: J-pop
- Label: EMI/Universal Music Japan
- Lyricist: Yasushi Akimoto

AKB48 singles chronology
"Hisashiburi no Lip Gloss" (2022)	"Dōshitemo Kimi ga Suki da" (2023)	"Idol Nankaja Nakattara" (2023)

Music videos
- "Doushitemo Kimi ga Suki da." (どうしても君が好きだ) on YouTube

"Dōshitemo Kimi ga Suki da" (Japanese: どうしても君が好きだ, romanized: Dōshitemo Kimi ga Suki da, lit. 'No matter what, I still love you') is the 61st single by Japanese idol girl group AKB48. It is released on April 26, 2023. Member Hitomi Honda served as both lead singer and choreographic center.

This is the first single released under Universal Music label.

== Background and release ==
The first official information about the single was announced on December 7, 2022, during the broadcast of the variety programme "Sayanora Mouri-san", where it was revealed that the winning team of the "Cooking Senbatsu" competition, which began on the live streaming app Showroom on September 29, 2022, will be performing a B-side song in a single scheduled to release the following year. Following a competition to sell the most plates of their specified dish in a cafe event, the winning team and the participating members were announced on the January 13, 2022 broadcast of "Sayonara Mouri-san".

The release of the 61st single, the A-side participating members, as well as the label change from King Records to Universal Music Japan was officially announced on February 27, 2023 via a teaser trailer on YouTube. Trainees Sora Yamazaki and Yuki Hirata were selected for the first time, joining fellow trainee Airi Sato who was also selected to take part in the 60th single. Details on the track titles, B-side participating members, and jacket covers were later revealed on March 15, 2023.

== Track listings ==
All the lyrics were written by Yasushi Akimoto

Type A
No.	Title	Length
1.	"Dōshitemo Kimi ga Suki da (どうしても君がすきだ; No matter what I still love you)"	4:16
2.	"Neta Furi (寝たふり; Pretend to sleep)"	4:16
3.	"Sayonara Janai (サヨナラじゃない; It's Not Goodbye)"	3:51
4.	"Dōshitemo Kimi ga Suki da" (off vocal version)	4:16
5.	"Neta Furi" (off vocal version)	4:16
6.	"Sayonara Janai" (off vocal version)	3:51
Total length:		24:46

Type B
No.	Title	Length
1.	"Dōshitemo Kimi ga Suki da (どうしても君がすきだ; No matter what I still love you)"	4:16
2.	"Neta Furi (寝たふり; Pretend to sleep)"	4:16
3.	"Wonderland"	4:33
4.	"Dōshitemo Kimi ga Suki da" (off vocal version)	4:16
5.	"Neta Furi" (off vocal version)	4:16
6.	"Wonderland" (off vocal version)	4:33
Total length:		26:10

Type C
No.	Title	Length
1.	"Dōshitemo Kimi ga Suki da (どうしても君がすきだ; No matter what I still love you)"	4:16
2.	"Neta Furi (寝たふり; Pretend to sleep)"	4:16
3.	"Ano Natsu no Bōhatei (あの夏の防波堤; That Summer Breakwater)"	4:12
4.	"Dōshitemo Kimi ga Suki da" (off vocal version)	4:16
5.	"Neta Furi" (off vocal version)	4:16
6.	"Ano Natsu no Bōhatei" (off vocal version)	4:12
Total length:		25:28

Official Store Edition
No.	Title	Length
1.	"Dōshitemo Kimi ga Suki da (どうしても君がすきだ; No matter what I still love you)"	4:16
2.	"Neta Furi (寝たふり; Pretend to sleep)"	4:16
3.	"Da Re Da (Who. Is. It.)"	4:37
4.	"Dōshitemo Kimi ga Suki da" (off vocal version)	4:16
5.	"Neta Furi" (off vocal version)	4:16
6.	"Da Re Da" (off vocal version)	4:37
Total length:		26:18

== Participating members ==
=== "Doushitemo Kimi ga Suki da" ===
"Doushitemo Kimi ga Suki da" (どうしても君がすきだ; No matter what I still love you) performed by selection "senbatsu" members

- Team A: Erī Chiba, Mion Mukaichi
- Team K: Shinobu Mogi, Mizuki Yamauchi
- Team B: Yuki Kashiwagi, Maho Omori
- Team 4: Yuiri Murayama
- Team 8: Hitomi Honda, Erina Oda, Momoka Onishi, Narumi Kuranoo, Rin Okabe, Yui Oguri
- Trainees: Airi Sato, Sora Yamazaki, Yuki Hirata

=== "Neta Furi" ===
"Neta Furi" (寝たふり; Pretend to sleep) performed by AKB48 Cooking Senbatsu Dessert Club, Seina Fukuoka Center

- Team A: Saho Iwatate, Seina Fukuoka
- Team K: Ran Kobayashi, Ayu Yamabe
- Team B: Sena Ishiwata, Ayana Shinozaki
- Team 8: Rin Okabe

=== "Sayonara Janai" ===
"Sayonara Janai" (サヨナラじゃない; It's Not Goodbye) performed by Team 8, Yui Oguri and Narumi Kuranoo Centers

- Team 8: Sorano Uemi, Hatsuka Utada, Rin Okabe, Hinako Okuhara, Yui Oguri, Erina Oda, Momoka Onishi, Misaki Kawahara, Narumi Kuranoo, Yurina Gyoten, Hiyuka Sakagawa, Nagisa Sakuguchi, Miu Shitao, Maria Shimizu, Kaoru Takaoka, Ayana Takahashi, Sayaka Takahashi, Remi Tokunaga, Serika Nagano, Haruna Hashimoto, Yuna Hattori, Sayuna Hama, Hikaru Hirano, Ayaka Hidaritomo, Rei Fujizono, Hitomi Honda, Kyouka Yamada, Nanase Yoshikawa, Karen Yoshida

Note: Team 8’s last song before their suspension and went to hiatus

=== "Wonderland" ===
"Wonderland" performed by AKB48 SURREAL, SURRY (Remi Tokunaga) Center

- Team A: Erii Chiba
- Team K: Mizuki Yamauchi
- Team 8: Yui Oguri, Narumi Kuranoo, Miu Shitao
- Virtual Member: RERRY (Hiyuka Sakagawa), SURRY (Remi Tokunaga)

=== "Ano Natsu no Bōhatei" ===
"Ano Natsu no Bōhatei" (あの夏の防波堤; That Summer Breakwater) performed by Kenkyūsei, Airi Sato Center

- Kenkyūsei: Yuna Akiyama, Sae Arai, Yuki Ota, Kasumi Kudo, Hinano Kubo, Kokone Kohama, Yumemi Sako, Airi Satō, Kohina Narita, Eriko Hashimoto, Nozomi Hatakeyama, Yuki Hirata, Moka Hotei, Mayuu Masai, Miyuu Mizushima, Azuki Yagi, Yui Yamaguchi, Sora Yamazaki

=== "Da Re Da" ===
"Da Re Da" (Who. Is. It.) performed by Universe Girls, Nanami Asai, Ayami Nagatomo and Manaka Taguchi Centers

- Team A: Hitomi Otake, Haruka Komiyama, Haruna Saito, Chiyori Nakanishi, Ma Chia-Ling, Saki Michieda, Orin Muto, Yuzuka Yoshihashi
- Team K: Manami Ichikawa, Hinana Shimoguchi, Manaka Taguchi, Suzuha Yamane, Ami Yumoto
- Team B: Nanami Asai, Saki Kitazawa, Minami Sato, Kurumi Suzuki
- Team 4: Rina Okada, Miyuu Omori, Haruka Kurosu, Yukari Sasaki, Kiara Sato, Kyoka Tada, Megu Taniguchi, Ayami Nagatomo

== Charts ==
Chart performance for "Dōshitemo Kimi ga Suki da"
Chart (2023)	Peak position
Japan (Japan Hot 100)	3
Japan (Oricon)	1
Japan Combined Singles (Oricon)	1
Japanese Digital Albums (Oricon) Special Edition	25

== Certifications ==
Certifications for "Dōshitemo Kimi ga Suki da"
Region	Certification	Certified units/sales
Japan (RIAJ)	2× Platinum	500,000^{^}
^{^} Shipments figures based on certification alone.
