= Hisashiburi no Lip Gloss =

- Digital EP and type A limited edition cover

Single by AKB48
- B-side: "Sugar Night"; "Wonderful Love" (Type-A); "Wagamama Metaverse" (Type-B); "Majika" (Type-C); "Unmei no Uta" (Theater Edition)
- Released: October 19, 2022
- Recorded: 2022
- Genre: J-pop
- Label: King Records
- Lyricist: Yasushi Akimoto

AKB48 singles chronology
"Motokare Desu" (2022)	"Hisashiburi no Lip Gloss" (2022)	"Dōshitemo Kimi ga Suki da" (2023)

Music videos
- "Hisashiburi no Lip Gloss Music video SNS ver." (久しぶりのリップグロス) on YouTube

"Hisashiburi no Lip Gloss" (久しぶりのリップグロス, Hisashiburi no rippugurosu; lit. Lip Gloss After Some Time)) is 60th single by Japanese girl group AKB48. It was released on October 19, 2022. Member Erii Chiba served as both lead singer and choreographic center for the first time.

This single topped Oricon weekly singles chart after its release.

This was the last single released under King Records.

== Background and release ==
The very first official information about this single was announced on July 18, 2022, as the group collaborated with Showroom to select B-side participating members with the result announced on August 3, 2022.

On August 6, 2022, through the group official YouTube stream, A-side participation members known as senbatsu were officially announced as 16 formation members, first time after 4 years since "Sentimental Train" in 2018. Like their previous works, this single were sung by AKB-only members. Member Shinobu Mogi and Airi Satō were selected for the first time. Shinobu was selected for the first time since her debut in December 2011, while Airi who joined the group as trainees was selected after 5 month since her announcement as 17th generation members in May 2022. Airi was the first trainees to be chosen as A-side participated members after Satone Kubo who was selected for 48th single "Negaigoto no Mochigusare" in 2017. This is the last single to feature Tomu Muto, who announced her graduation from the group on October 8, 2022, at MX Matsuri! AKB48 60th Single "Hisashiburi no Lipgloss" Announcement Commemoration Concert in Budokan 2022 (MX祭り！AKB48 60th Single 「久しぶりのリップグロス」発表記念コンサートin武道館2022) after performing Show Fight! And will graduate from the group in March 2023.

On August 29, 2022, the group made an appearances at TBS's CDTV LIVE! LIVE! performing "Hisashiburi no Lip Gloss" for the first time.

On September 7, 2022, midnight pre-release single was released digitally. The artwork showing a solo silhouette of member Erī Chiba applying a lip gloss, this is her first ever solo artwork cover. A vertical music video that was shot in Okinawa for "Hisashiburi no Lip Gloss" were also released at 8 p.m. JST.

== Participating members ==
=== "Hisashiburi no Lip Gloss" ===
"久しぶりのリップグロス" ("Hisashiburi no Lip Gloss") performed by selection senbatsu performers, consisting of:

- Team A: Erī Chiba, Mion Mukaichi, Nana Okada
- Team K: Shinobu Mogi, Mizuki Yamauchi
- Team B: Yuki Kashiwagi, Maho Omori
- Team 4: Yuiri Murayama
- Team 8: Hitomi Honda, Erina Oda, Momoka Onishi, Miu Shitao, Narumi Kuranō, Rin Okabe, Yui Oguri
- Trainees: Airi Satō

=== "Sugar Night" ===
"Sugar Night" performed by chosen Showroom Senbatsu performers, consisting of:

- Team A: Hitomi Otake, Saho Iwatate
- Team K: Suzuha Yamane
- Team B: Ayana Shinozaki
- Team 8: Hitomi Honda, Erina Oda, Momoka Onishi, Yui Oguri

=== "Wonderful Love" ===
17th Generation Kenkyuusei (17期研究生) (10 members) (Sato Airi & Mizushima Miyuu Centers)

Kenkyuusei: Ota Yuki, Kohama Kokone, Sato Airi, Hashimoto Eriko, Hatakeyama Nozomi, Hirata Yuki, Hotei Moka, Masai Mayuu, Mizushima Miyuu, Yamazaki Sora

=== "Wagamama Metaverse" ===
AKB48 SURREAL (6 Members) (Tokunaga Remi (SURRY) Center)

- Team A: Chiba Erii
- Team K: Yamauchi Mizuki
- Team 8: Oguri Yui, Kuranoo Narumi, Shitao Miu
- Virtual Member: SURRY (Tokunaga Remi)

=== "Majika" ===
Second Generation (26 members) (Sakagawa Hiyuka Center)

- Team A: Saito Haruna, Michieda Saki
- Team K: Kobayashi Ran, Shimoguchi Hinana, Taguchi Manaka, Yamabe Ayu
- Team B: Ishiwata Sena, Sato Minami, Suzuki Kurumi, Nagano Megumi
- Team 4: Kurosu Haruka
- Team 8: Uemi Sorano, Utada Hatsuka, Okuhara Hinako, Kawahara Misaki, Sakagawa Hiyuka, Takahashi Sayaka, Tokunaga Remi, Nagano Serika, Hattori Yuna, Hama Sayuna, Hirano Hikaru, Fujizono Rei, Mitomo Mashiro, Yamada Kyoka, Yoshida Karen

=== "Unmei no Uta" ===
First Generation (27 members) (Muto Tomu Center)

- Team A: Komiyama Haruka, Nakanishi Chiyori, Fukuoka Seina, Ma Chia-Ling, Muto Orin, Yoshihashi Yuzuka
- Team K: Ichikawa Manami, Muto Tomu, Yumoto Ami
- Team B: Asai Nanami, Inagaki Kaori, Kitazawa Saki
- Team 4: Omori Miyuu, Okada Rina, Sato Kiara, Tada Kyoka, Taniguchi Megu, Nagatomo Ayami, Sasaki Yukari
- Team 8: Gyoten Yurina, Sakaguchi Nagisa, Shimizu Maria, Takaoka Kaoru, Takahashi Ayane, Hashimoto Haruna, Hidaritomo Ayaka, Yoshikawa Nanase

== Charts ==
=== Weekly charts ===
Weekly chart performance for "Hisashiburi no Lip Gloss"
Chart (2022)	Peak position
Japan (Japan Hot 100)	4
Japan (Oricon)	1

=== Monthly charts ===
Monthly chart performance for "Hisashiburi no Lip Gloss"
Chart (2022)	Peak position
Japan (Oricon)	3

=== Year-end charts ===
Year-end chart performance for "Hisashiburi no Lip Gloss"
Chart (2022)	Position
Japan (Oricon)	23
Japan Top Singles Sales (Billboard Japan)	21

== Certifications ==
Certifications for "Hisashiburi no Lip Gloss"
Region	Certification	Certified units/sales
Japan (RIAJ)	Platinum	250,000^{^}
^{^} Shipments figures based on certification alone.

== Release history ==
Release dates and formats for "Hisashiburi no Lip Gloss"
Country	Date	Format	Version	Catalog number	Label	Ref.
South Korea	September 7, 2022	Digital download; streaming	Pre-release	—N/a	C&L Music; KING RECORDS	
Various	September 7, 2022	Digital download; streaming	Pre-release	NOPA-3684	You, Be Cool!; KING RECORDS	
South Korea	October 19, 2022	Digital download; streaming	Special Edition	—N/a	C&L Music; KING RECORDS	
Various	October 19, 2022	Digital download; streaming	Special Edition	NOHR-653	You, Be Cool!; KING RECORDS	
Japan	October 19, 2022	CD+DVD	Type-A	KIZM-90739～40 (Limited), KIZM-739～40 (Regular)	You, Be Cool!; KING RECORDS	
Japan	October 19, 2022	CD+DVD	Type-B	KIZM-90741～2 (Limited), KIZM-741～2 (Regular)	You, Be Cool!; KING RECORDS	
Japan	October 19, 2022	CD+DVD	Type-C	KIZM-90743～4 (Limited), KIZM-743～4 (Regular)	You, Be Cool!; KING RECORDS	
Japan	October 19, 2022	CD	Theater	NMAX-1401	You, Be Cool!; KING RECORDS	
