= Documentary of AKB48 Show Must Go On =

- Film poster

Japanese name
- Kanji: DOCUMENTARY of AKB48 Show must go on 少女たちは傷つきながら、夢を見る
Transcriptions
- Revised Hepburn: Documentary of AKB48 Show Must Go On: Shoujotachi wa Kizutsukinagara, Yume o Miru
- Directed by: Eiki Takahashi
- Produced by: Yoshihiro Furusawa; Kumiko Isono (Akimoto Yasushi Jimusho; Takumi Matsumura (AKS); Akihiro Makino (AKS); Kaori Kishibe)
- Starring: AKB48; SKE48; NMB48; HKT48; SDN48; JKT48
- Narrated by: Mamiko Noto
- Cinematography: Taku Murakami
- Edited by: Junichi Ito
- Music by: Hiroto Otsubo
- Production company: Toho
- Distributed by: Toho Co. Ltd
- Release date: January 27, 2012
- Running time: 115 minutes
- Country: Japan
- Language: Japanese

Documentary of AKB48 Show Must Go On (DOCUMENTARY of AKB48 Show must go on 少女たちは傷つきながら、夢を見る, Documentary of AKB48 Show Must Go On: Shoujotachi wa Kizutsukinagara, Yume o Miru) is a Japanese production documentary film about Japanese idol AKB48 released January 27, 2012. The film is the second documentary about AKB48, the continuation of the first document "Documentary of AKB48 To Be Continued".

As with the first film, the film contains AKB48's career documentation for a year throughout 2011, along with interviews with members. Contents ranging from AKB48 2011 election, AKB48 2011 rock-cutting tournament, Dareka no Tame ni: What Can I Do for Someone? Project, to the atmosphere behind the three-day concert stage at Seibu Dome, 22–24 July 2011.

The film was directed by Eiki Takahashi who handled AKB48's music video, from the beginning of their debut, "Keibetsu Shiteita Aijō" (2007) to "Ue kara Mariko" (2011). The theme song of this movie is "First Rabbit".

This documentary film became a best-selling film in Japan. On the weekly ranking of the best-selling film Kogyo Tsushinsha January 30, 2012, the film went straight in the 7th.
