= Hitomi Honda =

Japanese singer and actress (born 2001)

- Honda in 2024
- Born: 6 October 2001 (age 24); Tochigi Prefecture, Japan
- Occupations: Singer; actress
- Years active: 2014–present
- Musical career
- Genres: J-pop; K-pop
- Instrument: Vocals
- Labels: Inkode; Off the Record (Note: As a member of Iz*One only.)
- Member of: Say My Name
- Formerly of: Iz*One; AKB48

Japanese name
- Kanji: 本田 仁美
- Hiragana: ほんだ ひとみ
- Romanization: Honda Hitomi

Korean name
- Hangul: 혼다 히토미
- Revised Romanization: Honda Hitomi
- McCune–Reischauer: Honda Hit'omi

Signature
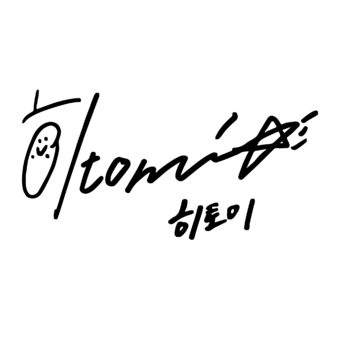

Hitomi Honda (本田 仁美; born 6 October 2001) is a Japanese singer and actress based in South Korea. She is the leader of the South Korean girl group Say My Name, and former member of South Korean–Japanese project girl group Iz*One and Japanese girl group AKB48.

== Career ==
=== 2012–2017: Early career and debut in AKB48 ===
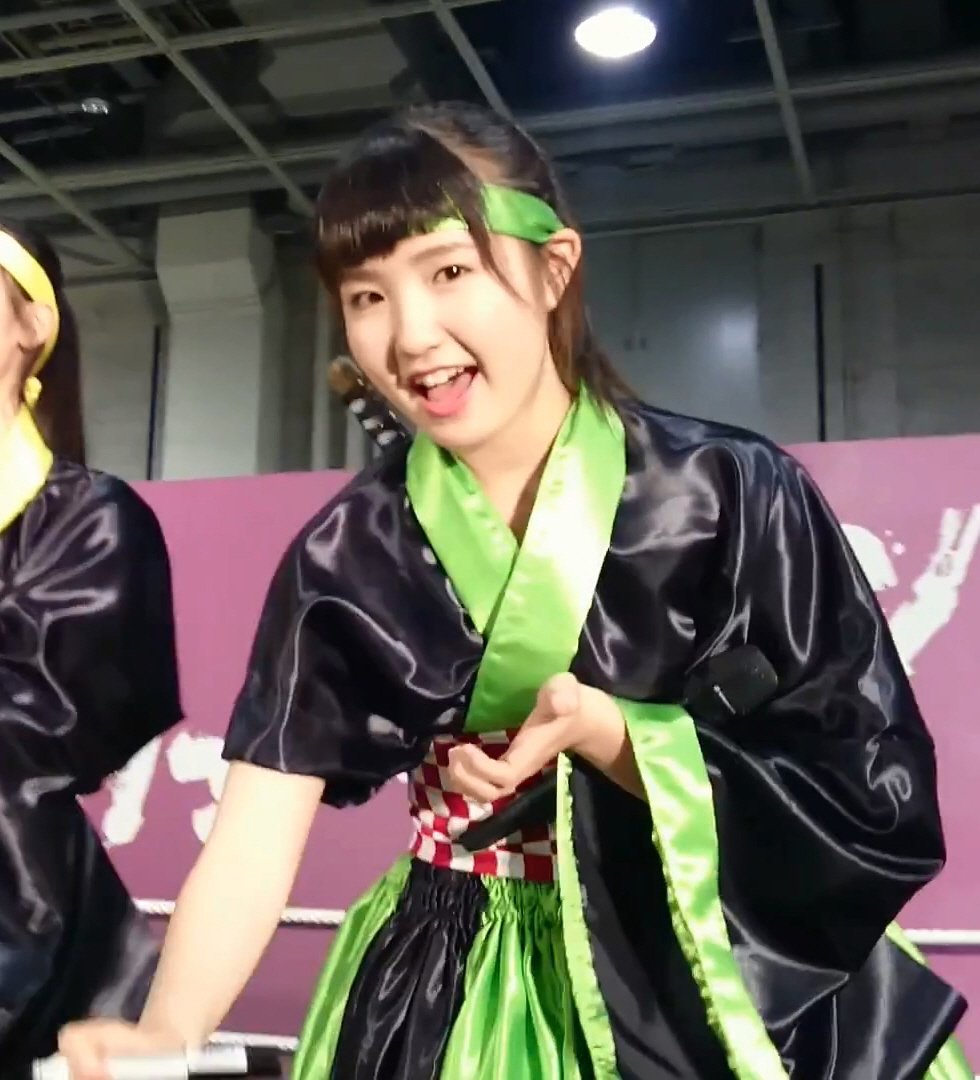
Honda at an AKB48 handshake event in 2017

From 2012 to 2014, when Honda was in elementary school, she appeared on Kodomojikan, a local program in her hometown.

Honda auditioned for AKB48's Team 8 in 2014 and was accepted into the group at the age of 12, representing Tochigi Prefecture. On 3 December 2024, she was appointed the Tochigi Future Ambassador by the Governor of Tochigi Prefecture.

In 2017, she was the main reporter for a local program on Tochigi Television, introducing information about Tochigi Prefecture.

=== 2018–2021: Breakthrough, Produce 48, and Iz*One ===
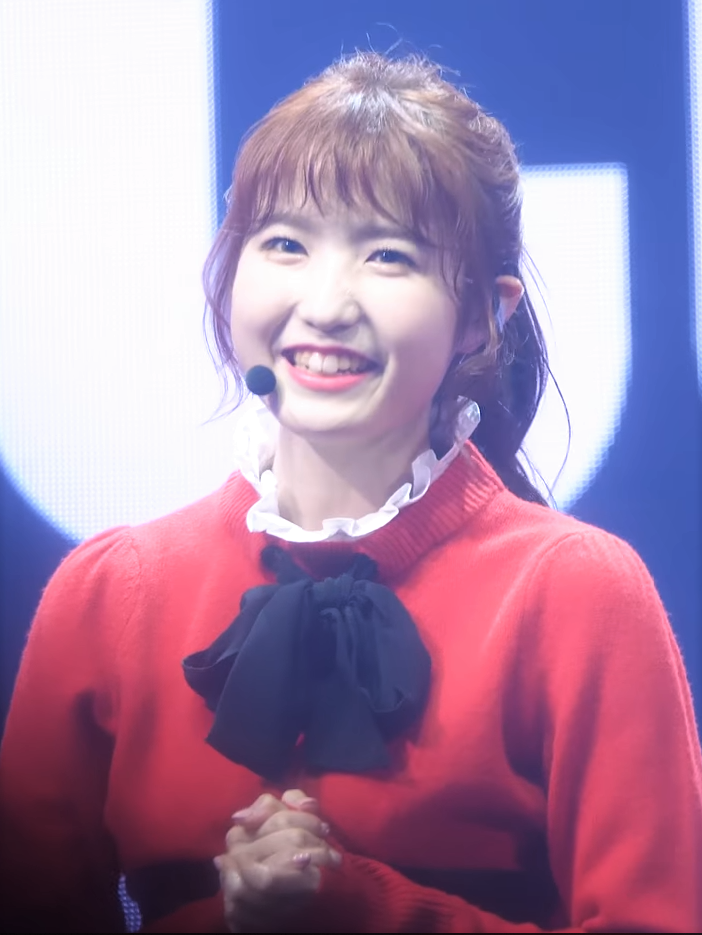
Honda in October 2018

In April 2018, she hosted a radio program, Toyota Rental Lease Presents: Honda Hitomi Heat Is On, on Radio Berry.

In the 2018 AKB48 General Election from May to June, she ranked 82nd, entering the rankings for the first time.

In August, Honda placed 9th on the reality girl group survival show, Produce 48, becoming a member of the Korean-Japanese idol group Iz*One.

In September, it was announced that Honda would be appearing on an AKB48 title track for the first time with the release of "No Way Man" in November. On the same day, she announced that she would be taking a 2.5-year-long hiatus from AKB48 to focus on her activities with Iz*One.

In October, she debuted as a member of Iz*One with the release of "La Vie en Rose".

In October 2020, Hitomi was the model for the Japanese brand titty&co for their Winter 2020 Collection; she later became the brand's exclusive model in 2021.

On 29 April 2021, Honda concluded activities with Iz*One with the expiration of her contract. In May, she appeared in the final performance for the AKB48 Team 8 national tour, her first appearance as a member of the group after her hiatus.

On 8 October, she launched her own cosmetic beauty brand named NOTONE. Honda ended her management contract with Vernalossom on 31 December, transferring to DH a day later.

=== 2022–2023: Post-Iz*One activities ===
On 23 February 2022, it was announced that Honda would serve as the A-side lead singer and the choreographic center for AKB48's 59th single, Moto Kare desu (元カレです), which marks her first time in both positions. She was appointed as the brand muse for Utena's haircare product Matomage in March. On 1 July, it was announced that DH was transferred to Mama & Son, affiliated with Production Ogi. Honda made her acting debut later that month with a cameo in the third episode of Octo: Kanjou Sousakan Shinno Akari. In October, she starred in Hokuo Kojirase Nikki, her first leading role.

Due to the suspension of AKB48 Team 8 activities in April 2023, Honda became a member of Team A starting 1 May. In July, she played the supporting role of Enami Misato in the show The Greatest Teacher. On 30 August 2023, Honda announced that she would be graduating from AKB48. Her last single with the group was "Idol Nanka Janakattara", AKB48's 62nd single which released on 27 September.

In December, she hosted the pre-ceremony red carpet event for the 2023 Melon Music Awards with fellow former Iz*One member Nako Yabuki and Ha Ji-young.

=== 2024–present: Graduation from AKB48 and debut with Say My Name ===
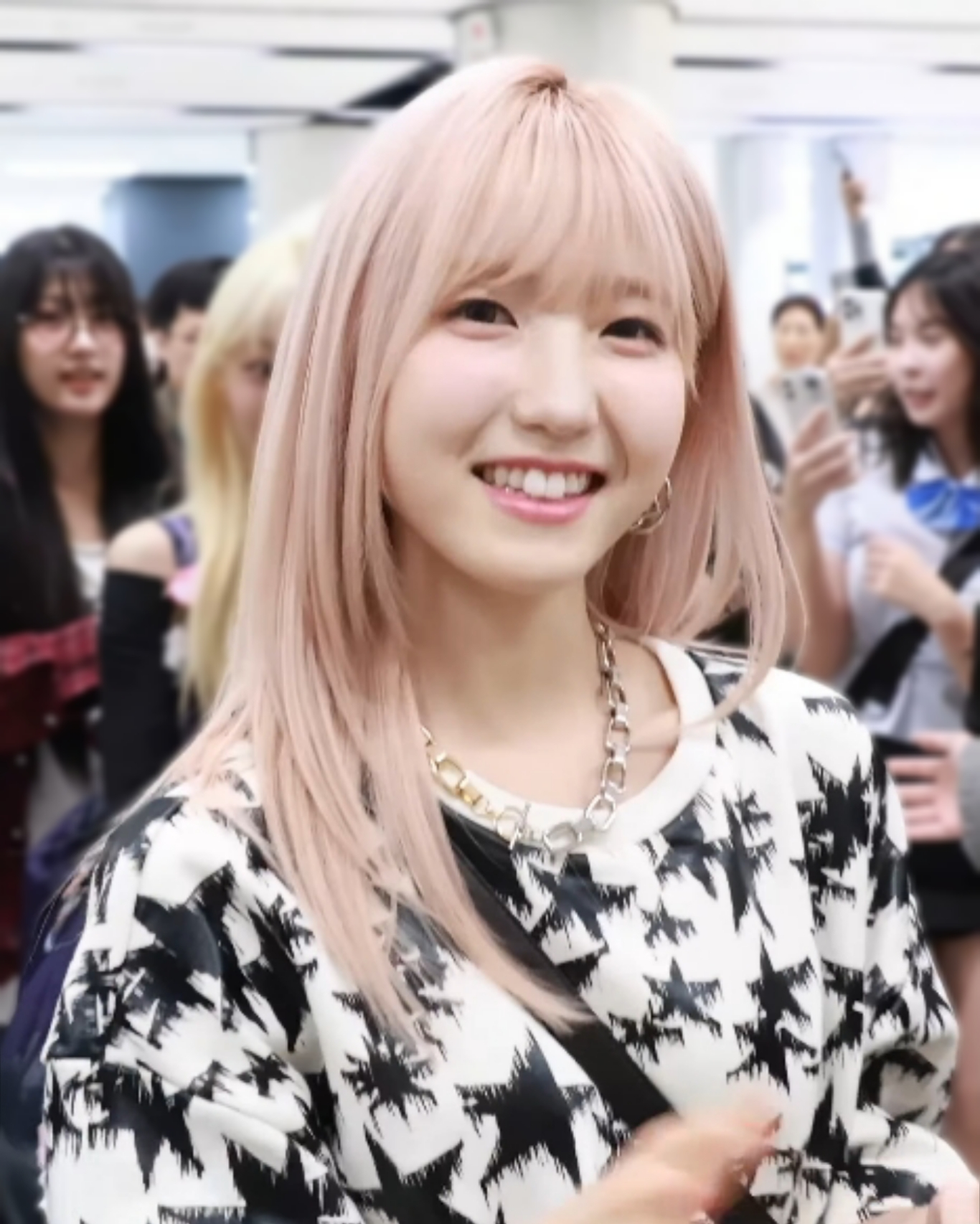
Honda in October 2024

Her graduation concert was held on 26 January 2024, at Pacifico Yokohama, and she held her graduation and last theater live performance at the AKB48 Theater on 28 January 2024. Honda left Mama & Son Entertainment on 1 May 2024.

On 13 September 2024, Honda was announced as the final member of the 7-member South Korean girl group Say My Name. She was named as the leader of the group during the group's debut showcase on October 15. The group officially debuted the next day with an eponymous EP and "WaveWay" as its lead single.

== Personal life ==
Honda was born on 6 October 2001 at Tochigi Prefecture, Japan. Honda's family consists of her mother, father, and an elder brother and sister. She is a fan of the Utsunomiya Brex basketball team, and from 4th to 6th grade she took part in their cheerleading school.

== AKB48 General Election Placements ==
Since her debut in 2014, Honda has taken part in sixth edition of AKB48's annual general election. This is her ranking placement :

Edition	Year	Final rank	Number of votes	Position on single	Single
6	2014	Not ranked	Not ranked	Not ranked	Not ranked
7	2015	Not ranked	Not ranked	Not ranked	Not ranked
8	2016	Not ranked	Not ranked	Not ranked	Not ranked
9	2017	Not ranked	Not ranked	Not ranked	Not ranked
10	2018	82	17,656	First Row; Commemorative Category	"Nami ga Tsutaeru Mono"

== Discography ==
=== Songwriting credits ===
Year	Song	Album	With
2019	"Really Like You"	Heart*Iz	YOSKE, Kim Min-ju, Alive Knoh
2020	"Merry-Go-Round"	Oneiric Diary	N/A
2020	"La Vie en Rose (Japanese Ver.)"	Twelve	MosPick
2024	"Be a Star" (난 오늘 밤하늘에서 가장 빛나는 별이된다)	Say My Name	Chase, 1Take, REIDD
2025	"음 만난 그날처럼 (He Told Me)"	My Name Is...	1Take (NEWTYPE), Remain (NEWTYPE)
2025	"UFO (Attent!on)"	&Our Vibe	bay, Cha On, Dawnon, Dohee, Etta Zelmani, INFX, Kanny, Kim Caeah, Kim Hye Jung, Lee Angdoo, Lua, Rasmus Palmgren, Yeon Bora

== Filmography ==
=== Television series ===
Year	Title	Role	Notes	Ref.
2022	Octo: Kanjou Sousakan Shinno Akari	Hinami Sumire	Guest (Ep. 3)	
2022	Hokuo Kojirase Nikki	Ootori Shimako	Main lead	
2023	The Greatest Teacher	Enami Misato	Support Role	
2024	Patisserie Mon	Tsukahara Kiyomi	Support Role	

=== Television shows ===
Year	Title	Notes	Ref.
2018	Produce 48	Placed 9th Survival show determining Iz*One members	

=== Web shows ===
Year	Title	Role	Notes	Ref.
2022	Adola Travel Agency: Cheat-ing Trip	Cast member	Season 3	
2025	Geek World	Host	Season 2	

=== Radio shows ===
Year	Title	Notes	Ref.
2018–2019	Toyota Rental Lease Presents: Honda Hitomi Heat Is On	Solo DJ	
2019	Nezas presents: Iz*One Honda Hitomi no World Get You	Solo DJ	
2023–2024	Idol Champ presents: Pop-K Top 10	Solo DJ	
2025–2026	Say My Name's Say Your Name♡!!	With Mei	
