= Sentimental Train =

2018 single by AKB48

- Sentimental Train CD+DVD Type-C (Limited Edition) cover. From top left, clockwise: Mina Oba, Tomu Muto, Nana Okada, Yui Yokoyama

Single by AKB48
- Released: September 19, 2018
- Genre: J-Pop
- Label: You, Be Cool! / King; Genie Music; Stone Music Entertainment
- Lyricist: Yasushi Akimoto
- Producer: Yasushi Akimoto

AKB48 singles chronology
"Teacher Teacher" (2018)	"Sentimental Train" (2018)	"No Way Man" (2018)

Music video
- Sentimental Train (Complete Version)

"Sentimental Train" (センチメンタルトレイン, Senchimentaru Torein) is the 53rd single by Japanese idol girl group AKB48. It was released in Japan by King Records on September 19, 2018. The single would feature Jurina Matsui as the center performer, but due to health issues, she was absent from the music video and the first performances.

== Background ==
On June 16, 2018, the results of the 10th AKB48 Group general election, in which fans voted which members of AKB48 and its sister groups would participate in the AKB48 53rd single, was announced at the Nagoya Dome. Jurina Matsui of SKE48 placed first overall with 194,453 votes, making her the center performer for the single's titular main song. On the same day, it was announced that the single will be released on September 19 in five versions. On July 7, it was revealed that the title for the 53rd single would be "Sentimental Train".

== Release ==
Jurina Matsui went on hiatus due to poor health shortly after the election announcement, and she did not participate in early recordings and live performances of the single. In the music video, released on YouTube on August 22, her likeness was alternately replaced by a body double, a computer-animated model, and hand-drawn illustrations. King Records announced that when Jurina returns from hiatus, the music video and single will be re-recorded with her participating.

Matsui returned from hiatus on September 6 and performed the song for the first time on Music Station the next day. The music video with Jurina is available for physical disc owners with a code allowing for users to view a re-recorded version of the music video and a new cover. On June 16, 2019, the complete version was released on YouTube.

== Commercial performance ==
"Sentimental Train" debuted atop the Oricon Singles Chart in its daily chart on September 18, 2018, maintaining the spot for the next four days. It fell to number 2 in its sixth day and to number 4 in its seventh day. On the day of release, Billboard Japan reported that the single sold 1,551,061 copies in its first day.

The song debuted atop the Oricon Singles Chart for the week of October 1, 2018, with 1,448,900 physical copies sold. The song debuted at number 86 on Billboard Japan Hot 100. In its second week, the song rose to number 79 and topped the chart a week later.

"Sentimental Train" was the best-selling single of September 2018, with 1,457,758 physical copies sold.

The song was the 2nd best-selling single of 2018 on Oricon. The song placed at number 32 at Billboard Japan's Hot 100 Year End and placed at number 2 on the Top Singles Sales Year End chart.

== Track listing ==
Type A
No.	Title	Length
1.	"Sentimental Train" (センチメンタルトレイン)
2.	"Sandal ja Dekinai Koi" (サンダルじゃできない恋)
3.	"Tomodachi ja nai ka?" (友達じゃないか?)
4.	"Sentimental Train" (Off vocal version)
5.	"Sandal ja Dekinai Koi" (Off vocal version)
6.	"Tomodachi ja nai ka?" (Off vocal version)

Type B
No.	Title	Length
1.	"Sentimental Train"
2.	"Sandal ja Dekinai Koi"
3.	"Aru Hi Fui ni…" (ある日 ふいに…)
4.	"Sentimental Train" (Off vocal version)
5.	"Sandal ja Dekinai Koi" (Off vocal version)
6.	"Aru Hi Fui ni..." (Off vocal version)

Type C
No.	Title	Length
1.	"Sentimental Train"
2.	"Sandal ja Dekinai Koi"
3.	"Hitonatsu no Dekigoto" (ひと夏の出来事)
4.	"Sentimental Train" (Off vocal version)
5.	"Sandal ja Dekinai Koi" (Off vocal version)
6.	"Hitonatsu no Dekigoto" (Off vocal version)

Type D
No.	Title	Length
1.	"Sentimental Train"
2.	"Sandal ja Dekinai Koi"
3.	"Nami ga Tsutaeru Mono" (波が伝えるもの)
4.	"Sentimental Train" (Off vocal version)
5.	"Sandal ja Dekinai Koi" (Off vocal version)
6.	"Nami ga Tsutaeru Mono" (Off vocal version)

Type E
No.	Title	Length
1.	"Sentimental Train"
2.	"Sandal ja Dekinai Koi"
3.	""Suki" no Tane" (“好き”のたね)
4.	"Sentimental Train" (Off vocal version)
5.	"Sandal ja Dekinai Koi" (Off vocal version)
6.	""Suki" no Tane" (Off vocal version)

Theater Edition
No.	Title	Length
1.	"Sentimental Train"
2.	"Sandal ja Dekinai Koi"
3.	"Yuri wo Sakaseru ka?" (百合を咲かせるか？)
4.	"Sentimental Train" (Off vocal version)
5.	"Sandal ja Dekinai Koi" (Off vocal version)
6.	"Yuri wo Sakaseru ka?" (Off vocal version)

== Charts ==
=== Weekly charts ===
Chart (2018)	Peak position
Japan (Oricon)	1
Japan (Japan Hot 100)	1

=== Year-end charts ===
Chart (2018)	Peak position
Japan (Oricon)	2
Japan (Japan Hot 100)	32

== Certifications ==
Country	Provider	Certifications
Japan	RIAJ	Million

== Release history ==
Region	Date	Format	Label
Japan	September 19, 2018	CD; digital download; streaming	King Records (YOU BE COOL division)
Hong Kong, Taiwan	September 19, 2018	CD; digital download; streaming	King Records
South Korea	October 12, 2018	digital download; streaming	Stone Music Entertainment; Genie Music; King
