= 53rd Japan Record Awards =

2011 Japanese music awards ceremony

- Date: December 30, 2011
- Venue: New National Theater, Tokyo
- Country: Japan
- Hosted by: Masaaki Sakai, Norika Fujiwara

Television/radio coverage
- Network: TBS

The 53rd Japan Record Awards (第53回日本レコード大賞) took place at the New National Theater in Tokyo on December 30, 2011. The ceremony was televised in Japan on TBS.

== Presenters ==
- Masaaki Sakai
- Norika Fujiwara
- Shinichirō Azumi (TBS commentator)
- Sylwia Kato (TBS commentator)
- Erina Masuda (TBS commentator)

Radio

- Masao Mukai (TBS commentator)

== Winners and winning works ==
=== Grand Prix ===
- AKB48 — "Flying Get"

=== Best Singer Award ===
- Fuyumi Sakamoto

=== Best New Artist Award ===
- Fairies

=== Best Album Award ===
- Kazumasa Oda — Dōmo (どーも)

=== New Artist Award ===
The artists who are awarded the New Artist Award are nominated for the Best New Artist Award.

- Miyu Itō (伊藤 美裕)
- Super Girls
- 2NE1
- Fairies
