= Flying Get =

2011 single by AKB48

- Regular Edition Type A cover

Single by AKB48

from the album 1830m
- B-side: "Dakishimecha Ikenai"; "Seishun to Kizukanai Mama"; "Ice no Kuchizuke"
- Released: August 24, 2011 (Japan)
- Recorded: 2011
- Genre: J-pop; Latin rock
- Length: 4:14:00
- Label: You, Be Cool! / King
- Songwriter: Yasushi Akimoto (lyrics)
- Producer: Yasushi Akimoto

AKB48 singles chronology
"Everyday, Katyusha" (2011)	"Flying Get" (2011)	"Kaze wa Fuiteiru" (2011)

Music videos
- Flying Get (preview) on YouTube
- Flying Get (Dancing Version) on YouTube
- Dakishimecha Ikenai (preview) on YouTube

"Flying Get" (フライングゲット, Furaingu Getto) (Note: *Flying get (フライングゲット, lit. "flying score", "flying win", "flying target") is the Japanese Internet slang word for buying a computer game, a music CD, etc. more than a day earlier than its official release date specified by manufacturer.) is the 22nd single by the Japanese idol girl group AKB48, released on August 24, 2011. Its members were chosen by the AKB48 2011 general election. It won the Grand Prix of Japan Record Awards, which was the first time a female group accomplished it.

== 2011 general election ==
The participating members were chosen by AKB48's 2011 general election. Each of AKB48's 21st single "Everyday, Kachusha" contained a ballot that allows the buyer to register a vote for one of the member candidates for the group's 22nd single. The top 21 vote-getters would get to participate in the title track, and the top 12 from the lineup would be prominently featured in its promotions. The winner of the general election was Atsuko Maeda, with Yuko Oshima as runner up. The members who were ranked 22 to 40 were grouped as "Under Girls" and recorded on one of the B-sides.

List of top 21 members from the AKB48 general election
Rank	Name	Team	Number of votes
1	Atsuko Maeda	AKB48 Team A	139,892
2	Yuko Oshima	AKB48 Team K	122,843
3	Yuki Kashiwagi	AKB48 Team B	74,252
4	Mariko Shinoda	AKB48 Team A	60,539
5	Mayu Watanabe	AKB48 Team B	59,118
6	Haruna Kojima	AKB48 Team A	52,920
7	Minami Takahashi	AKB48 Team A	52,790
8	Tomomi Itano	AKB48 Team K	50,403
9	Rino Sashihara	AKB48 Team A	45,227
10	Rena Matsui	SKE48 Team S	36,929
11	Sae Miyazawa	AKB48 Team K	33,500
12	Aki Takajo	AKB48 Team A	31,009
13	Rie Kitahara	AKB48 Team B	27,957
14	Jurina Matsui	SKE48 Team S	27,804
15	Minami Minegishi	AKB48 Team K	26,070
16	Tomomi Kasai	AKB48 Team B	22,857
17	Sayaka Akimoto	AKB48 Team K	17,154
18	Amina Sato	AKB48 Team B	16,574
19	Yui Yokoyama	AKB48 Team K	16,455
20	Yuka Masuda	AKB48 Team B	14,137
21	Asuka Kuramochi	AKB48 Team A	12,387

== Tie-ins ==
The title track was the theme song for the Fuji TV drama series Hanazakari no Kimitachi e 'Ikemen Paradise' 2011, which starred AKB48 member Atsuko Maeda. The track was also featured in a television commercial for Peach John's lingerie brand "Heart Bra", and starred AKB48 members Yuko Oshima, Haruna Kojima and Tomomi Kasai.

== Music video ==
The music video for "Flying Get" was directed by Yukihiko Tsutsumi. Its full version (included only in bonus disc for its single) lasts over 18 minutes and features a plot similar to those of action films. Instead releasing a normal MV on AKB48's official YouTube channel, a dance shot version (with the full song) was uploaded. The dance shot version focuses on the group's choreography while retaining the song's full length.

== Reception ==
The single sold 1,025,952 copies on the first day of its release, becoming the first single in Oricon history to sell over one million copies on its first day of release.

Flying Get hit No.1 in Rekochok monthly download ranking, and has been downloaded more than 1 Million copies.

Flying Get hit No.1 in weekly Hot 100, Hot Top Airplay, Hot Singles Sales, Adult Contemporary Airplay of Billboard Japan, and No.2 in Billboard Japan Hot 100 Year End.

"Flying Get" outsold the group's previous single, "Everyday, Katyusha", in the last week of sales in 2011, and became the overall number-one selling single of 2011.

== Awards ==
Year	Ceremony	Award	Result
2011	53rd Japan Record Awards	Grand Prix	Won
2011	53rd Japan Record Awards	Excellent Work Award	Won
2011	70th Television Drama Academy Awards	Best Theme Song	Won
2011	44th Japan Cable Awards	Excellent Music Award	Won
2012	26th JAPAN GOLD DISC AWARDS	Best 5 singles	Won
2013	JASRAC Awards	Silver Award	Won

== Track listing ==
Type-A CD
No.	Title	Length
1.	"Flying Get" (フライングゲット Furaingu Getto)	4:14
2.	"Dakishimecha Ikenai" (抱きしめちゃいけない)	5:37
3.	"Seishun to Kizukanai Mama" (青春と気づかないまま)	5:14
4.	"Flying Get" (Off Vocal Ver.)	4:14
5.	"Dakishimecha Ikenai" (Off Vocal Ver.)	5:37
6.	"Seishun to Kizukanai Mama" (Off Vocal Ver.)	5:13
Total length:		30:11

Type-A DVD
No.	Title	Length
1.	"Flying Get" (Music Video)
2.	"Dakishimecha Ikenai" (Music Video)
3.	"Seishun to Kizukanai Mama" (Music Video)
4.	"Butō Eiga 'Kurenai Hachigatsu ~ Chōjō Kessen-hen'" (武闘映画「紅い八月〜頂上決戦篇」)
5.	"Flying Get" (Dancing Version)

Type-B CD
No.	Title	Length
1.	"Flying Get"	4:14
2.	"Dakishimecha Ikenai"	5:36
3.	"Ice no Kuchizuke" (アイスのくちづけ Aisu no Kuchizuke)	4:16
4.	"Flying Get" (Off Vocal Ver.)	4:14
5.	"Dakishimecha Ikenai" (Off Vocal Ver.)	5:36
6.	"Ice no Kuchizuke" (Off Vocal Ver.)	4:15
Total length:		28:13

Type-B DVD
No.	Title	Length
1.	"Flying Get" (Music Video)
2.	"Dakishimecha Ikenai" (Music Video)
3.	"Ice no Kuchizuke" (Music Video)
4.	"Dai 3kai AKB48 Sōsenkyo Document Eizō" (第3回AKB48総選挙 ドキュメント映像)
5.	"Butō Eiga 'Kurenai Hachigatsu ~ Chōjō Kessen-hen - Yokoku'" (武闘映画「紅い八月～頂上決戦篇・予告」)

Theater Edition CD
No.	Title	Length
1.	"Flying Get"	4:14
2.	"Dakishimecha Ikenai"	5:36
3.	"Yasai Uranai" (野菜占い)	3:51
4.	"Flying Get" (Off Vocal Ver.)	4:14
5.	"Dakishimecha Ikenai" (Off Vocal Ver.)	5:37
6.	"Yasai Uranai" (Off Vocal Ver.)	3:50
Total length:		27:25

== Music review ==
Even though the "single CD" has several coupling songs, the review below talks about flying get mostly.

Review from Hotexpress describe this song has "electric guitar sings on the rhythm full of Latin flavor", “refrain like a roller coaster” and "this work would pioneer a new realm of idol music, and has a party tune that changes Japan to midsummer throughout the year, to everyone." Review from CDjournal states that it has "soulful sound and the hot positive message featuring the sound of passionate horn." Review in TokyoHeadline wrote that "Flying Get is a Latin rock-like music that starts with the samba rhythm reminiscent of a carnival", and the music video "likes a conspiracy and action-packed short film" and "is out of the ordinary".

== Members ==
=== "Flying Get" ===
The lineup for the main single consists of the top 21 members from AKB48's 2011 general election. The top 12 members were given additional media promotion.
The number in brackets indicates the member's ranking.

- Team A: Haruna Kojima (6), Asuka Kuramochi (21), Atsuko Maeda (1), Rino Sashihara (9), Mariko Shinoda (4), Minami Takahashi (7), Aki Takajō (12)
- Team K: Sayaka Akimoto (17), Tomomi Itano (8), Minami Minegishi (15), Sae Miyazawa (11), Yūko Ōshima (2), Yui Yokoyama (19)
- Team B: Tomomi Kasai (16), Yuki Kashiwagi (3), Rie Kitahara (13), Yuka Masuda (20), Amina Satō (18), Mayu Watanabe (5)
- SKE48 Team S: Jurina Matsui (14), Rena Matsui (10)

=== "Dakishimecha Ikenai" ===
Performed by Under Girls, which consist of members who ranked 22 to 40 in AKB48's 2011 general election.
The number in brackets indicates the member's ranking.
Center: Ayaka Umeda (22)

- Team A: Ami Maeda (37), Haruka Nakagawa (24), Aika Ōta (25), Shizuka Ōya (29),
- Team K: Reina Fujie (40), Sakiko Matsui (38), Moeno Nito (31), Ayaka Umeda (22)
- Team B: Natsumi Hirajima (26), Mika Komori (32), Miho Miyazaki (27), Sumire Satō (34)
- Team 4: Miori Ichikawa (39), Mina Oba (35)
- SKE48 Team S: Masana Ōya (30), Akari Suda (36)
- SKE48 Team KII: Sawako Hata (33), Akane Takayanagi (23),
- NMB48 Team N: Sayaka Yamamoto (28)

=== "Seishun to Kizukanai Mama" ===
The ending theme of Majisuka Gakuen 2

Center: Atsuko Maeda

- Team A: Aika Ota, Asuka Kuramochi, Haruna Kojima, Rino Sashihara, Mariko Shinoda, Aki Takajo, Minami Takahashi, Atsuko Maeda, Ami Maeda
- Team K: Sayaka Akimoto, Tomomi Itano, Yuko Oshima, Ayaka Kikuchi, Moeno Nito, Minami Minegishi, Sae Miyazawa, Yui Yokoyama
- Team B: Tomomi Kasai, Yuki Kashiwagi, Rie Kitahara, Mika Komori, Sumire Sato, Miho Miyazaki, Mayu Watanabe
- Team 4: Miori Ichikawa, Mina Oba, Haruka Shimazaki, Haruka Shimada, Mariya Nagao, Suzuran Yamauchi
- Team S: Jurina Matsui, Rena Matsui

=== "Ice no Kuchizuke" ===
Performed by a special unit formed to promote Ezaki Glico's Ice no Mi, a bite-sized frozen candy. Gained worldwide headlines after the promotional campaign announced it would 'debut' a new member in the form of Aimi Eguchi, later revealed to the shock of many to be an advanced, CG-created amalgamation of six of the most popular members of the group voiced by 12th-generation kenkyūsei Yukari Sasaki.

- Team A: Atsuko Maeda, Mariko Shinoda, Minami Takahashi
- Team K: Tomomi Itano, Yuko Oshima
- Team B: Mayu Watanabe
- Kenkyūsei: Aimi Eguchi (Yukari Sasaki)

=== "Yasai Uranai" ===
Performed by Yasai Sisters, a special unit for AKB48 single, "Heavy Rotation", where they sang Yasai Sisters and used in Kagome CM.

Center: Atsuko Maeda

- Team A: Team A: Aika Ota, Asuka Kuramochi, Haruna Kojima, Rino Sashihara, Mariko Shinoda, Aki Takajo, Minami Takahashi, Atsuko Maeda, Ami Maeda
- Team K: Sayaka Akimoto, Tomomi Itano, Yuko Oshima, Moeno Nito, Minami Minegishi, Sae Miyazawa, Yui Yokoyama
- Team B: Tomomi Kasai, Yuki Kashiwagi, Rie Kitahara, Mika Komori, Sumire Sato, Miho Miyazaki, Mayu Watanabe
- Team S: Jurina Matsui, Rena Matsui
- Team KII: Akane Takayanagi, Manatsu Mukaida
- Team E: Kanon Kimoto
- Team N: Sayaka Yamamoto, Miyuki Watanabe

== Charts and certifications ==
=== Oricon Charts (Japan) ===
Release	Oricon Singles Chart	Peak position	Debut sales (copies)
24 August 2011	Daily Chart	1	1,025,952
24 August 2011	Weekly Chart	1	1,354,492
24 August 2011	Monthly Chart	1	1,354,492

=== Taiwan Weekly Chart ===
G-Music	Peak position
Combo Chart	14

=== Sales and certifications ===
Region	Certification	Certified units/sales
Japan (RIAJ)	Million	1,587,229
Japan (RIAJ) Digital single	Million	1,000,000^{*}
Japan (RIAJ) Ringtone	2× Platinum	500,000^{*}
^{*} Sales figures based on certification alone.

== SNH48 version ==
"Flying Get"
- Regular Edition

Single by SNH48
- B-side: "Ponytail to Shushu"; "Chance no Junban"
- Released: August 2, 2013
- Genre: Pop rock
- Label: Ocean Butterflies Music
- Songwriters: Original Japanese lyrics: Yasushi Akimoto; Chinese lyrics: Gu Rui; Gou Qing; Composer: Shinya Sumida; Shinya Tada; Yuko Konishi
- Producer: Yasushi Akimoto

SNH48 singles chronology
"Heavy Rotation" (2013)	"Flying Get" (2013)	"Fortune Cookie of Love" (2013)

"Flying Get" (Chinese: 飞翔入手; pinyin: Fēixiáng rùshǒu) was redone in Mandarin for AKB48's sister group in China, SNH48, as the group's second single; it was released on August 2, 2013. This EP also contains Mandarin tracks for Ponytail to Shushu (Chinese: 马尾与发圈, Pinyin: Mǎwěi yǔ fā quān) and Chance no Junban (Chinese: 石头剪刀布, Pinyin: Shítou jiǎndāo bù).

=== Personnel ===
The track was sung by the first generation members of SNH48:

- Wu Zhehan, Gu Xiangjun, Kong Xiaoyin, Jiang Yuxi, Xu Jiaqi, Xu Chenchen, Dai Meng, Tang Min, Qiu Xinyi, Chen Guanhui, Chen Si, Qian Beiting, Zhao Jiamin, Zhang Yuge, Ding Ziyan, Dong Zhiyi, Mo Han, Li Yuqi

=== Development ===
On July 2, 2013, SNH48 announced the filming of "Flying Get" to be held at the Shanghai World Financial Center. Fans had an opportunity to participate in the video by wearing a SNH48 "Flying Get" T-shirt.

== JKT48 version ==
"Flying Get"
- Alpha Group version

Single by JKT48

from the album Flying Get
- B-side: "Malu-Malu Lollypop (Hanikami Lollypop), Demi seseorang (Dareka no Tameni), Jadilah Batu yang berputar (Korogaru Ishi ni Nare), Heavy Rotation, Ingin Bertemu (Aitakata), Baby!Baby!Baby!, RIVER, Fortune Cookie in Love/Fortune Cookie Yang Mencinta, Gadis Remaja (Shoujotachi yo) "
- Released: March 5, 2014
- Genre: Pop
- Label: Hits Records
- Songwriter: Yasushi Akimoto (Original Japanese lyrics)
- Producer: Yasushi Akimoto

JKT48 singles chronology
"Manatsu no Sounds Good! - Musim Panas Sounds Good!" (2013)	"Flying Get" (2014)	"Gingham Check" (2014)

Alternative cover
- Theater Version

On February 15, 2014, JKT48 announced the group's fifth single to be "Flying Get".

=== Promotion and release ===
This single has the voting tickets for JKT48's 6th single Senbatsu Sosenkyo.

=== Personnel ===
Melody Laksani is the center performer for the title track. The performers are listed as follows:

- Team J: Ayana Shahab, Devi Kinal Putri, Ghaida Farisya, Haruka Nakagawa, Jessica Vania, Jessica Veranda, Melody Nurramdhani Laksani, Nabilah Ratna Ayu Azalia, Rezky Whiranti Dhike, Sendy Ariani, Shania Junianatha
- Team KIII : Alicia Chanzia, Cindy Yuvia, Ratu Vienny Fitrilya, Shinta Naomi, Viviyona Apriani

== Notes ==
Preceded by "I Wish for You" (Exile)	Japan Record Award Grand Prix; 2011	Succeeded by "Manatsu no Sounds Good!" (AKB48)
