= AKB48 =

Japanese idol group

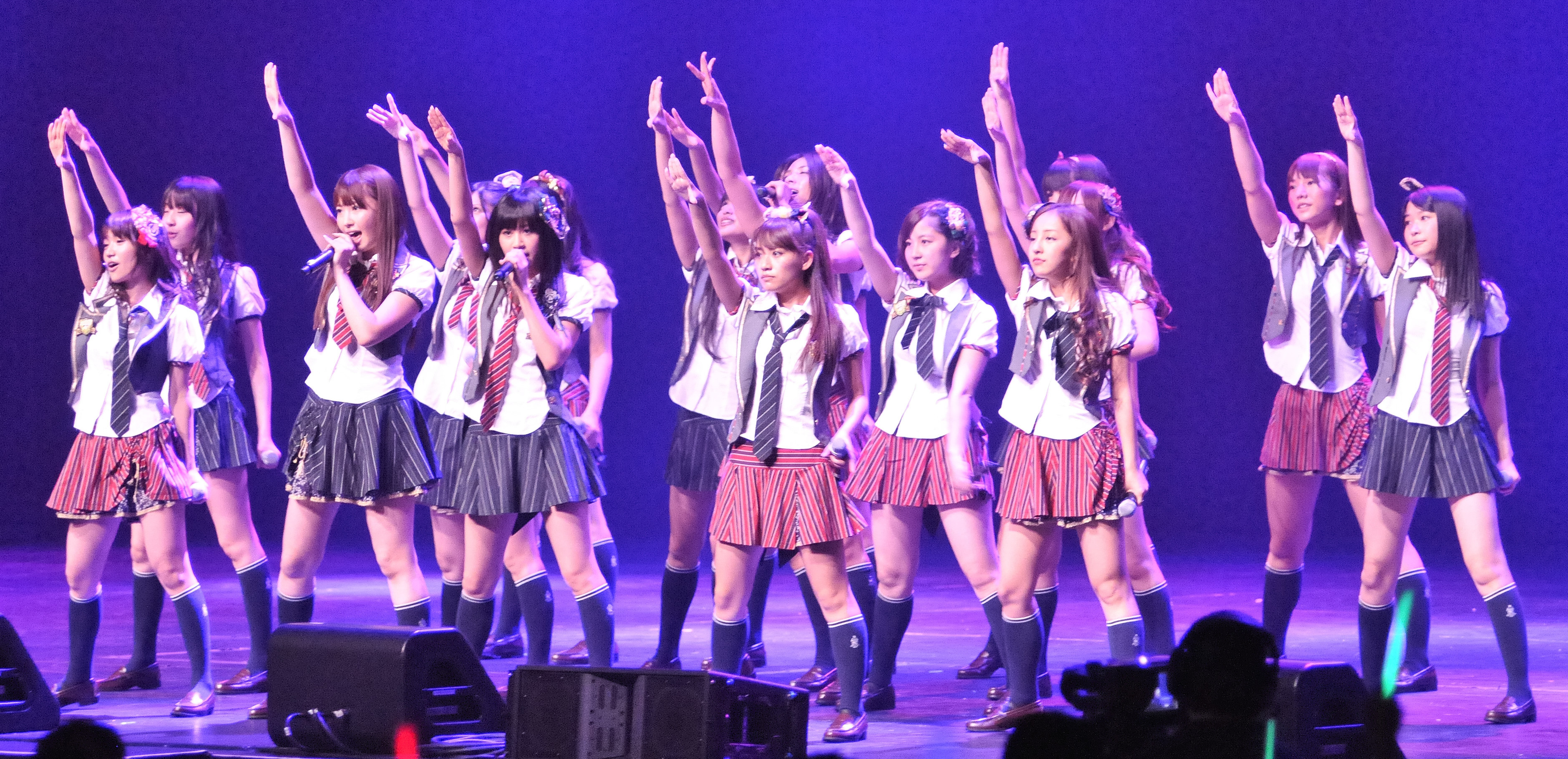
- AKB48 performing at the Nokia Theater (now Peacock Theater) in Los Angeles, California, in July 2010

Background information
- Origin: Akihabara, Tokyo, Japan
- Genre: J-pop
- Years active: 2005–present
- Labels: Defstar; You, Be Cool! / King; Avex Trax; Avex Group; Galaxy; Stone Music; Genie Music; Universal Music Japan
- Member of: AKB48 Group
- Members: See List of AKB48 members
- Past members: See List of former members of AKB48
- Website: akb48.co.jp

AKB48 (pronounced A.K.B. Forty-Eight) is a Japanese idol musical girl group named after the Akihabara area in Tokyo, where the group's theater is located. AKB48 has sold more records than any other female musical act in Japanese history. The group was founded and is comprehensively produced by lyricist Yasushi Akimoto, who serves as its general producer, writes the lyrics for all of the group's songs, and oversees its creative direction and business model. Akimoto wanted to form a girl group with its own theater and performing daily so fans could always see them live (which is not the case with usual pop groups giving occasional concerts and seen on television). This "Idols You Can Meet" concept includes teams which can rotate performances and perform simultaneously at several events and "handshake" events, where fans can meet group members. Akimoto also devised participatory marketing strategies such as the annual "Senbatsu General Elections," in which fans purchased CD singles to vote for their favorite members to be featured in promotional lineups. Over its history, the group has launched the careers of numerous prominent Japanese entertainers, most notably the original "Kami 7" ("God Seven")—the seven core members who occupied the top seven spots in both the first (2009) and second (2010) general elections and defined the group's golden era: Atsuko Maeda, Yuko Oshima, Mariko Shinoda, Mayu Watanabe, Minami Takahashi, Haruna Kojima, and Tomomi Itano—as well as other highly successful members who later ranked in the top seven, such as Yuki Kashiwagi and Rino Sashihara. Furthermore, Akimoto has expanded the AKB48 concept to several sister girl groups within Japan, and internationally in China, Indonesia, Thailand, Taiwan, the Philippines, and Malaysia.

AKB48 have been characterized as a social phenomenon. They are among the highest-earning musical acts in Japan, and are the sixth-best-selling girl group worldwide. For example, their 2012 sales from record and DVD/Blu-ray releases reached $226 million, earning the group the top spot in the 2012 artist ranking. By April 2019, the group had sold over 60 million records, including over 6 million albums. At least 35 of AKB48's singles have topped the Oricon Weekly Singles Chart, with at least 30 singles selling over a million copies each, making the group the highest-selling musical act in Japan in terms of singles sold. Their highest-selling single, "Teacher Teacher", sold over 3 million copies in 2018 according to Billboard / Soundscan. Between 2010 and 2019, AKB48's singles occupied at least the top two spots of the Oricon Yearly Singles Chart for ten consecutive years. As of the release of their 61st single, the group had surpassed 70 million total copies sold, and with the release of their 66th single, they achieved 53 consecutive number-one singles on the Oricon chart, a streak that began with "River" in 2009.

== Concept ==
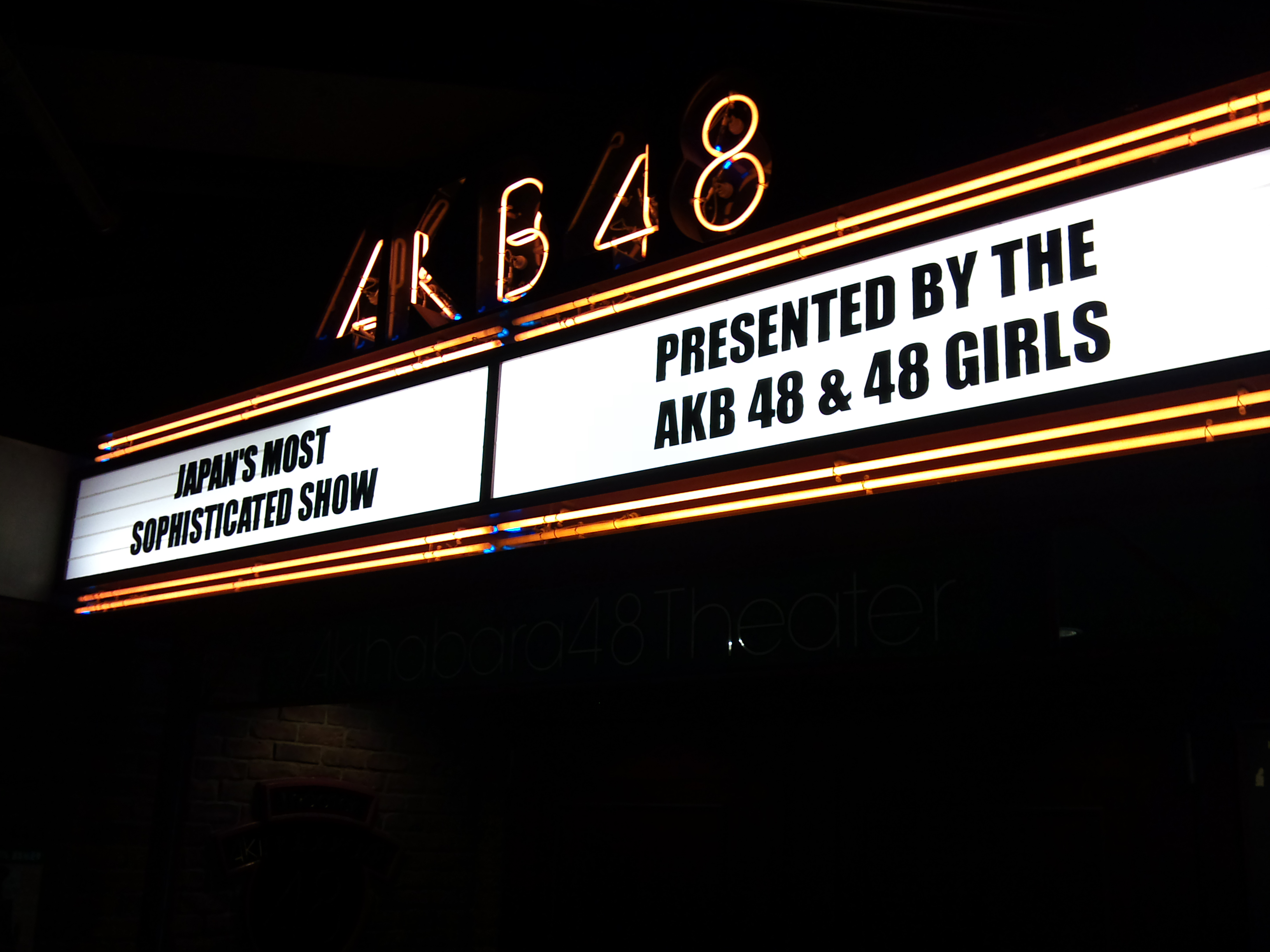
AKB48 Theater in Akihabara, Tokyo

AKB48 was founded as "idols you can meet". Japanese idols are entertainers/performers who appeal directly to fans for support. Close interactions between fans and idols allow idols to cultivate and maintain loyal fan followings. The group's chief producer, Yasushi Akimoto, said that his goal was to create a unique idol group which, unlike other idol groups which perform occasional concerts and appear primarily on television, would perform regularly in its own theater. (Note: Although AKB48 performs at the theater daily, tickets are distributed via a lottery only due to the high demand. (The theater offers 145 seats and 105 standing)) The AKB48 Theater is in the Don Quijote store in Akihabara, Tokyo.

The group is split into several teams, reducing its members' workload (since the theater's near-daily performance is by only one team at a time) and enabling AKB48 to perform simultaneously in several places. According to former member Misaki Iwasa, each team has its own theme. Team A represents freedom; Team B is idol-like, with cute costumes, and Team K has a strong, powerful image. According to an early press release, the group was intended to have 16 members on each of three teams, for a total membership of 48; but its membership has varied over time, and has exceeded 120 people. The team concept was abolished in 2023. New members are called trainees (研究生, kenkyūsei) who are understudies for the group, performing occasionally in the theater as a team.

The group members' ages range from their early teens to over 30, and they are selected from regular auditions. Members are not allowed to date, and must be well-behaved; any violation of these restrictions is to be punished, possibly by expulsion from the group. AKB48 has a system that allows members to "graduate" from the group when they are older and are replaced by trainees who are promoted. Monica Hesse of The Washington Post described the AKB48 audition process as "rolling American Idol-esque".

== History ==
=== 2005–2006: Creation and independent releases ===
In July 2005, Yasushi Akimoto held an audition for a new theater-based idol girl group. Of the 7,924 who auditioned, 24 were chosen as first-generation group members. On December 8, 20 members debuted as Team A in the AKB48 Theater performing "Party ga Hajimaru yo" (PARTYが始まるよ) to an audience of seven; attendance quickly increased. In January 2006, AKB48 cafe waitress Mariko Shinoda joined Team A as a "1.5 generation" member when her popularity with patrons prompted Akimoto to give her a special audition.

The group's second audition was held in cooperation with telecommunications company NTT DoCoMo in February 2006, with applicants submitting audition videos on mobile phones.

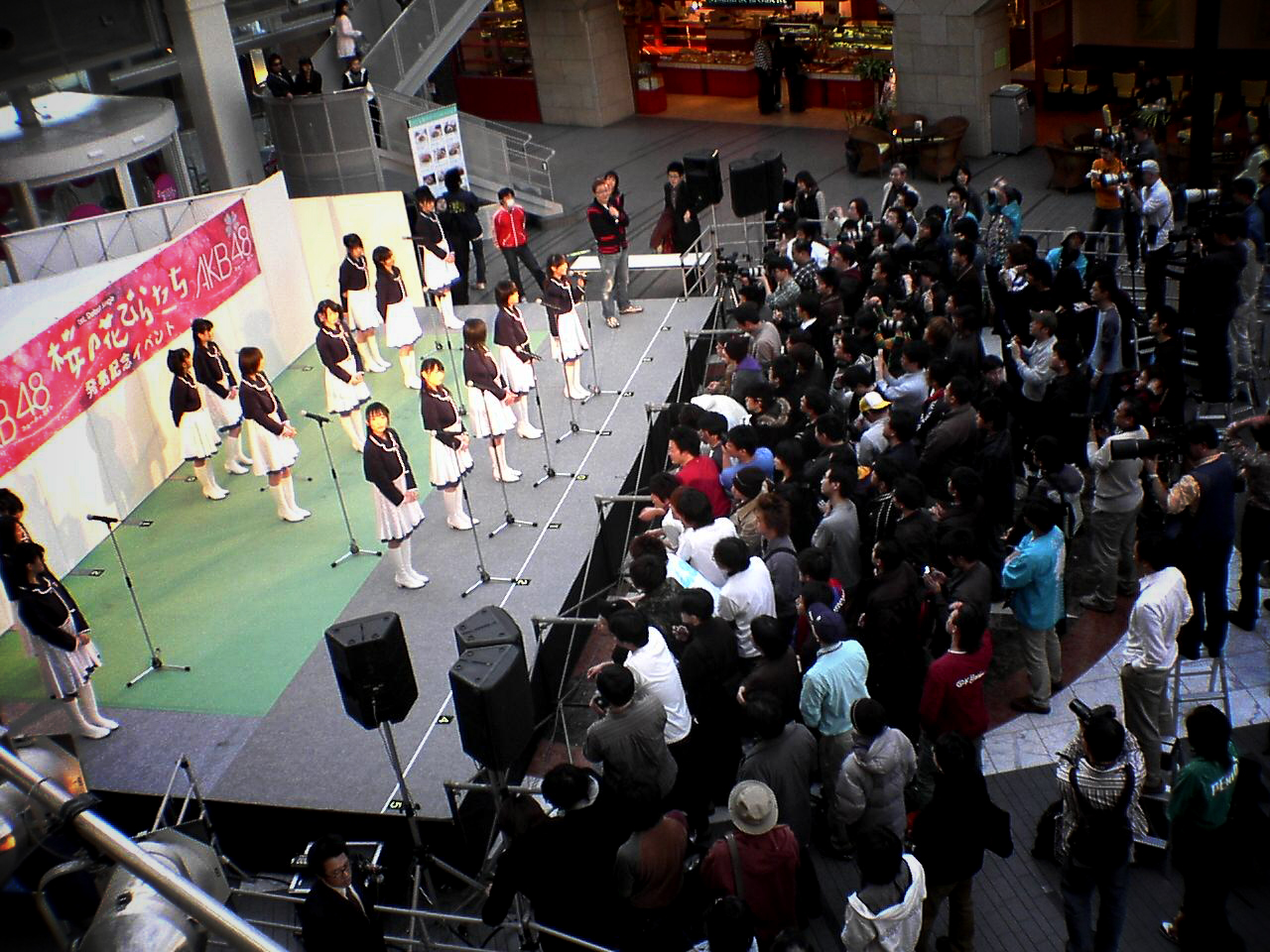
AKB48 preparing for its debut on March 26, 2006

Of 11,892 applicants, 19 were selected, and 18 joined AKB48 as Team K in April. Team K performed Party ga Hajimaru yo and Team A moved to a new stage program, Aitakatta.

AKB48 released its first independent-label single, "Sakura no Hanabiratachi", in February 2006. It entered Oricon's weekly Top 10 chart, with first-week sales of 22,011 (a rarity for an indie-label group). On March 31, Yuki Usami became the first member to "graduate" from the group. On June 7 AKB48 released its second independent single, "Skirt, Hirari", which sold 13,349 copies on its first day. The group made its first television appearance two days later, and signed a contract with DefStar Records (a subsidiary of Sony Music Entertainment) in August.

=== 2006–2007: Set List: Greatest Songs 2006–2007 ===
AKB48's logo

In October 2006 AKB48 announced auditions for Team B, and 13 girls were chosen out of 12,828 applicants in December. The group's first DefStar Records single, "Aitakatta", was recorded by 20 members of Teams A and K and released on October 25. It debuted at number 12 on the Oricon weekly singles chart, selling 25,544 copies in its first six weeks, and remained on the chart for a total of 65 weeks. On November 3–4 AKB48 performed its first concert, "AKB48 First Concert: Aitakatta ~Hashira wa Nai ze!~" at Nippon Seinenkan in Shinjuku. The group performed "Aitakatta" on the New Year's Eve TV program 58th NHK Kōhaku Uta Gassen as a part of the "Nihon ga Hokoru Saisentan! Special Medley". At 43 members, the group set a program record for the most people in one group onstage simultaneously. AKB48 made its first lineup change in December, transferring Kazumi Urano, Shiho Watanabe and Natsumi Hirajima from Team A to Team B as supporting members.

AKB48's second major-label single, "Seifuku ga Jama o Suru", was released on January 31, 2007 and debuted at number seven on the Oricon Top 10 chart. Its music video and lyrics hinted at the subject of enjo kōsai (compensated dating, remotely related to escort services outside Japan), triggering controversy and negative reviews. On March 18 AKB48 released "Keibetsu Shiteita Aijō"; debuting at number eight on the Oricon chart, it dropped to number 98 in its second week. The group's second concert, "AKB48 Haru no Chotto dake Zenkoku Tour ~Madamada daze AKB48!~" on March 10, had poor ticket sales.

In April 2007 AKB48 posted its Team B roster on its website, with five fewer members than originally announced; for the first time, its membership numbered 48. The group's fourth single, "Bingo!", was released on July 18. AKB48's sixth single, "Yūhi o Miteiru ka?", was released on Halloween 2007 and sold 18,429 copies (the least of all the group's singles).

=== 2008–2010: Kamikyokutachi ===
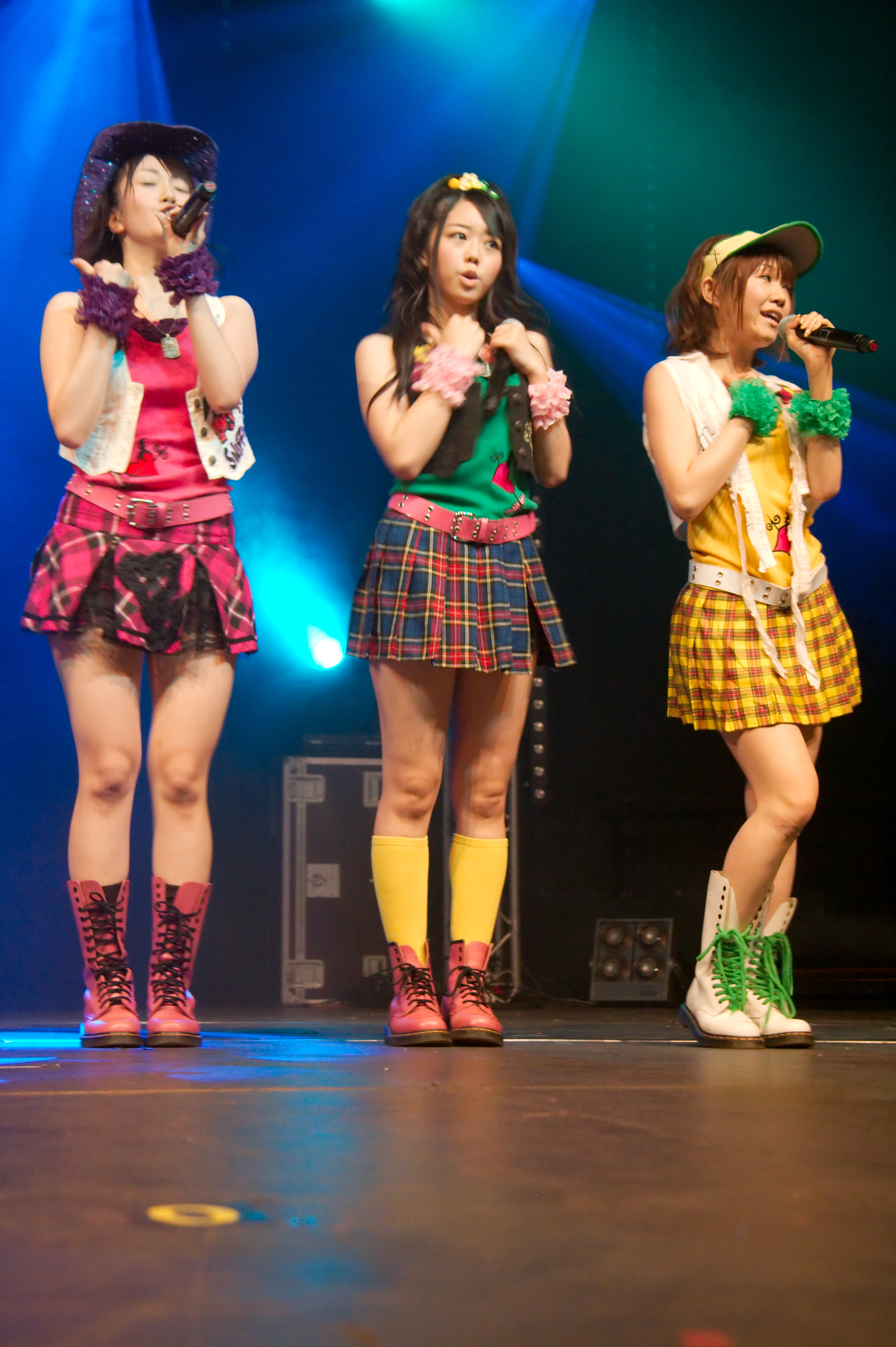
AKB48 live at Japan Expo 2009 (Paris)

On New Year's Day 2008, AKB48 released its first album, Set List: Greatest Songs 2006–2007, a collection of the group's singles and live song lists. The group's seventh major-label single (its ninth overall), "Romance, Irane", was released on January 23 and reached number six on the Oricon Top 10 chart in its first week.

On February 27, the group released its eighth major-label single, "Sakura no Hanabiratachi 2008", a reprise of its Team A debut single. This version featured ten members from Team A, six from Team K and five from Team B. The single's CD included a poster, and a promotion was planned in which fans who collected all 44 posters would be invited to a special event. The promotion was later canceled by DefStar Records amid concerns about possible violations of antitrust laws.

In June 2008, AKB48 announced plans to launch a sister group, SKE48, in Sakae, Nagoya. In August, the group moved from DefStar Records to King Records. That month Ayaka Kikuchi was the first member to be fired from the group, for "immature behavior" involving a leaked purikura photo of her with a boyfriend. Kikuchi returned to the group after a 2010 audition.

On October 22, AKB48's tenth single, "Ōgoe Diamond", was released on King Records' You Be Cool label. With 11-year-old SKE48 member Jurina Matsui as the single's center and cover girl, it was the first single featuring a member of AKB48's sister group and debuted at number three on the Oricon Top 10 weekly chart.

The group released its 11th major-label single, "10nen Sakura", on March 4, 2009. Also reaching number three on the Oricon charts in its first week, it was the group's first single to sell over 100,000 copies. The group's 12th major-label single, "Namida Surprise!", was released on June 24. Promotions included a handshaking-event ticket and a ballot for a member to headline its next single. "Namida Surprise!" sold 104,180 copies in its first week on the Oricon charts. AKB48's 13th single, "Iiwake Maybe", was released on August 26. Outselling rival SMAP's single, it reached number one on the Oricon Daily Singles Chart and number two on the Oricon Weekly Singles Chart.

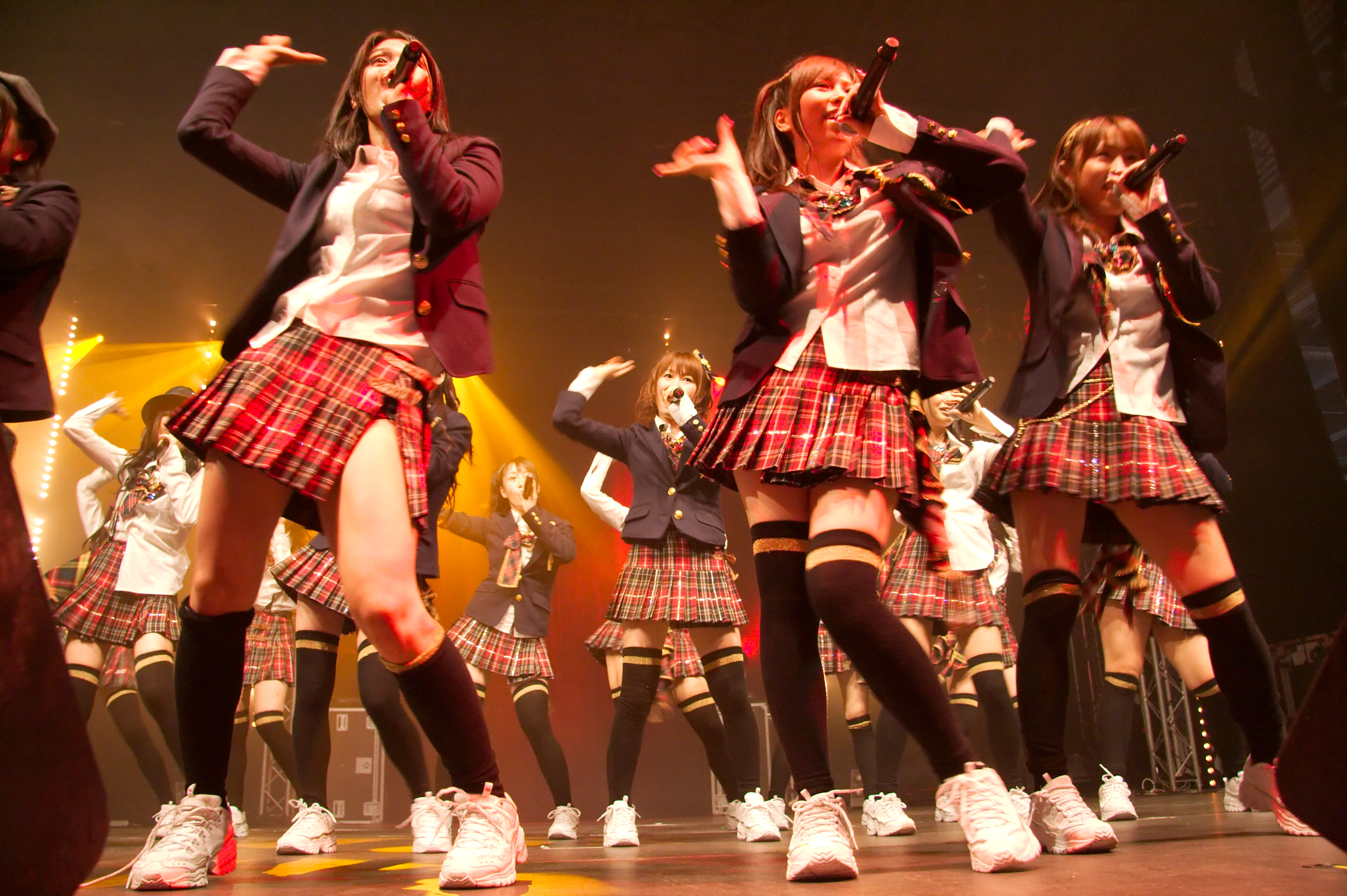
AKB48 at Japan Expo in Paris, 2009

AKB48's Team A was a guest of honor at the Japan Expo in Paris from July 2–5, 2009, performing an English version of "Ōgoe Diamond". The group made its U.S. debut with a show at Webster Hall in New York City on September 27.

In October, three AKB48 singles ("10nen Sakura", "Namida Surprise!" and "Iiwake Maybe") were certified gold by the Recording Industry Association of Japan. Its 14th single, "River" released on October 21, debuted atop the Oricon Top 10 weekly chart and was the group's first number one.

AKB48 released its 15th major-label single, "Sakura no Shiori", on February 17, 2010. In its first week, the single topped the Oricon chart with over 300,000 copies sold, the most by a Japanese female artist in seven years. This was the group's last single until the release of their first King Records album, Kamikyokutachi, which would top the Oricon album chart and be certified double platinum by the RIAJ for sales of over 500,000 copies.

=== 2010–2011: Koko ni Ita Koto ===
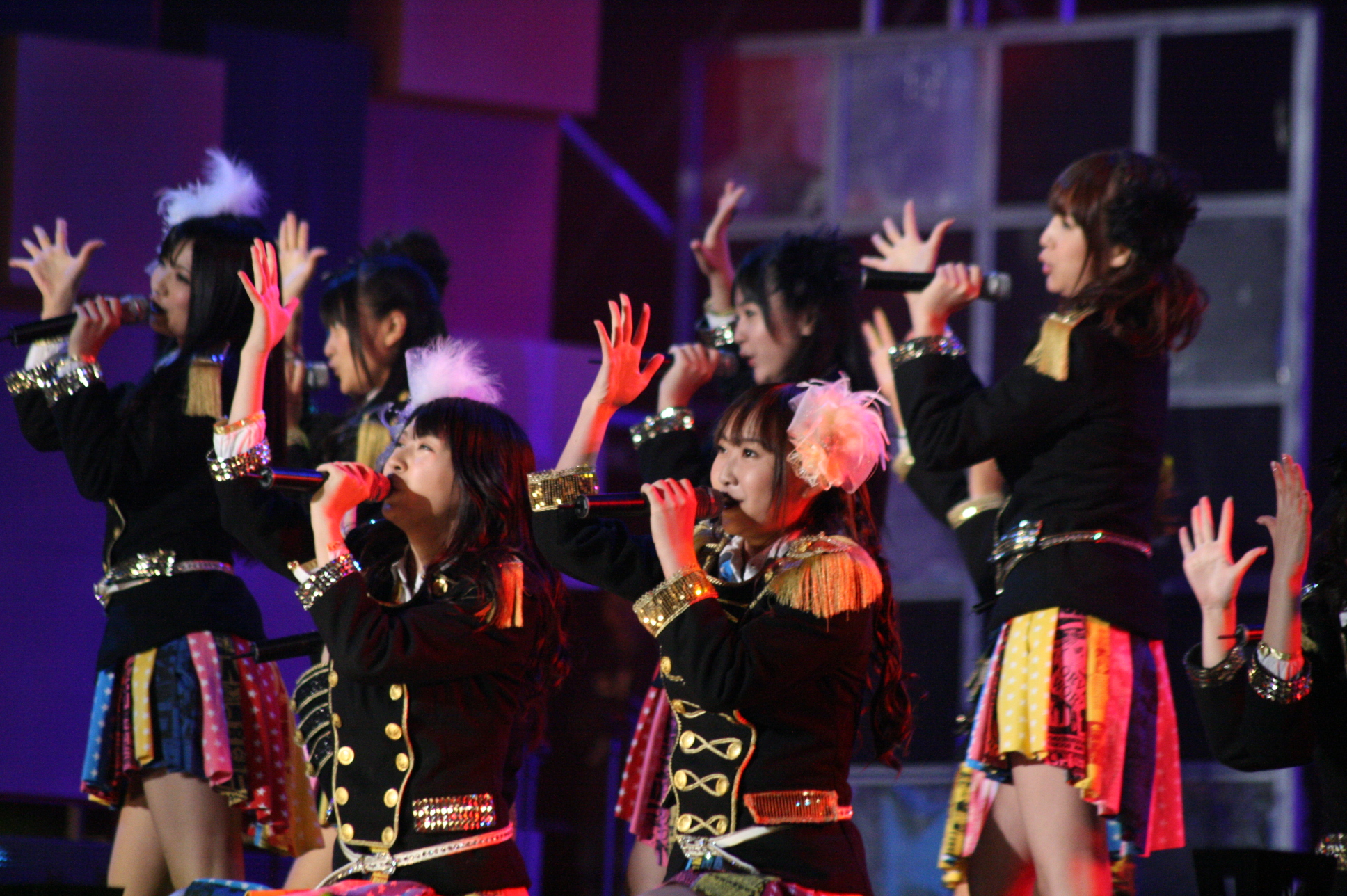
AKB48 at the 2010 Asia Song Festival

AKB48's 16th single, "Ponytail to Chouchou", was released on May 26, 2010. Its sales exceeded those of the previous single, with over 400,000 copies sold on its first day and over 513,000 in its first week. On April 27, Anime Expo, the largest anime convention in the United States, announced that AKB48 would be a guest of honor, and the group performed on July 1 at the Nokia Theatre.

On October 23, AKB48 represented Japan at the seventh Asia Song Festival, organized by the Korea Foundation for International Culture Exchange, at Seoul Olympic Stadium. Four days later the group released its 18th single, "Beginner". It sold 826,989 copies in its first week, the highest first-week sales for a female idol group single. AKB48 member Mayu Watanabe appeared on the cover of the December issue of the idol magazine UP to boy with Airi Suzuki from the Japanese girl group Cute, the first gravure collaboration between Hello! Project and AKB48.

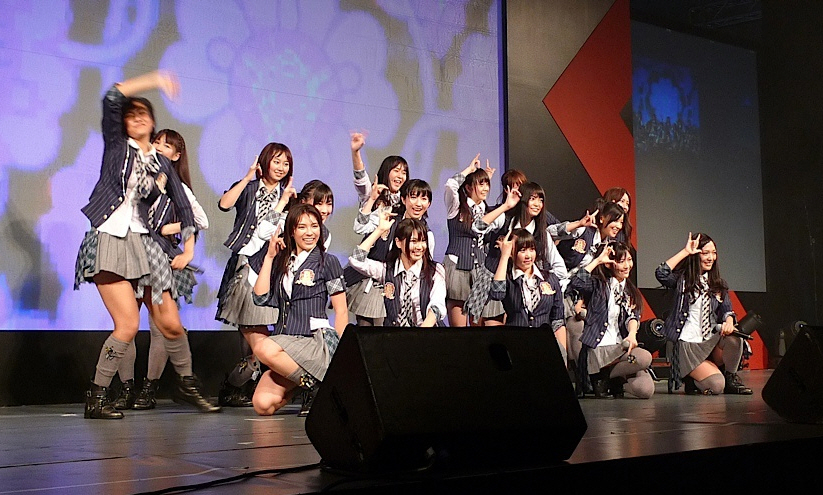
AKB48 on Cool Japan Night, as part of the November 2010 Anime Festival Asia X in Singapore

In November 2010, AKB48 participated in several events outside Japan. On November 20, 12 members of the group performed at the Japanese Pop Culture Festival in Moscow. AKB48 performed at the Cool Japan forum in Singapore as part of Anime Festival Asia X, and at the Singapore Toy, Games and Comics Convention. Group graduates in 2010 included second-generation member Erena Ono, who left on September 27 to pursue an acting career overseas.

The group's first 2011 single, "Sakura no Ki ni Narō", was released on February 16. It sold 655,000 copies on its first day, surpassing "Beginner's" first-day sales of 568,000. By the end of its first week the single sold 942,479 copies, the group's best and the fastest sales in Japan since 2000.

On February 21, AKB48 announced its first studio album, Koko ni Ita Koto (ここにいたこと), which would include 11 new tracks and was scheduled for an April 6 release. Due to the 2011 Tōhoku earthquake and tsunami, the group stopped its AKB48 Theater performances and canceled some of its public events. (Note: On March 14, 2011, AKB48 canceled its concert Takamina ni tsuite ikimasu (たかみなについて行きます; lit. "(We) will follow Takamina"), scheduled to be held on March 25–27 at Yokohama Arena, but later refashioned it into a charity event to support victims of the 2011 Tōhoku earthquake and tsunami.) AKB48 began the "Dareka no Tame ni" (誰かのために, lit. "For someone's sake") project, collecting donations for earthquake and tsunami relief. One of its concert venues, the Yokohama Arena, was used for a two-day charity event beginning on March 26 and 12 AKB48 members attended the Okinawa International Movie Festival that day for the same purpose. On March 15, AKB48 announced that ¥500 million would be donated by the group, its sister groups SKE48, SDN48 and NMB48 and associates of AKS, its management company. Koko ni Ita Koto's release was postponed until June 8, with part of the album's proceeds donated to disaster victims. On April 1 the group released the charity single "Dareka no Tame ni (What can I do for someone?)" (誰かのために -What can I do for someone?-) on the Recochoku website as a digital download, with all proceeds earmarked for earthquake and tsunami relief.

=== 2011–2012: 1830 m ===
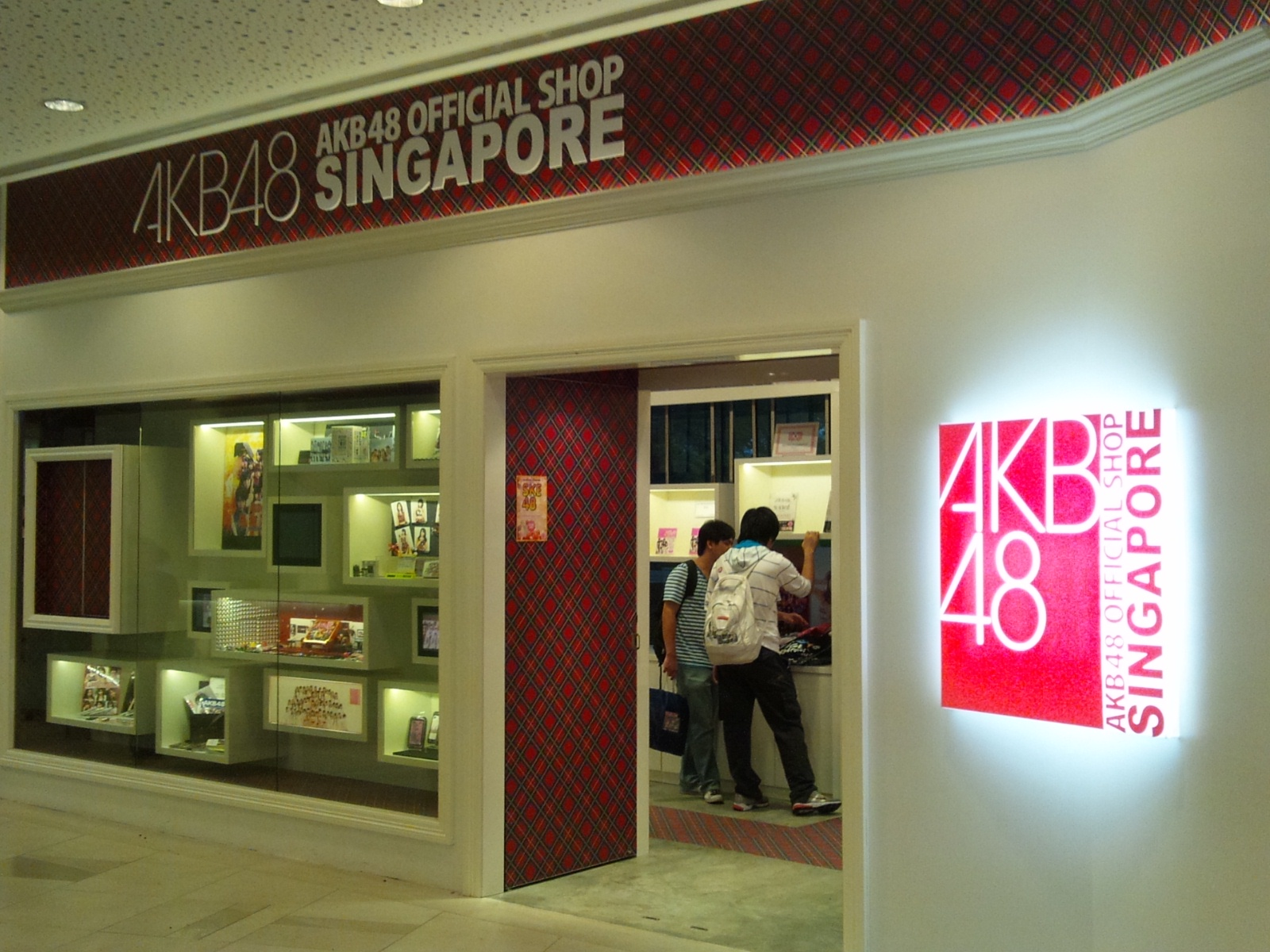
AKB48 shop in Singapore, 2011

On May 1, AKB48 announced a new sister group: HKT48, based in Fukuoka, Kyushu, with its theater in the Hawks Town Mall of Fukuoka's Chuo ward. On May 3, The Straits Times reported the opening of AKB48's first overseas theater in Singapore. The theater, in *scape Youth Park, would host 16 members from AKB48 and its sister groups for two shows a day two days a month. It had an adjacent AKB48 shop for merchandise and an AKB48 Cafe, serving Japanese fusion cuisine and desserts. In June, AKB48 was invited as a perform guest in 22nd Golden Melody Awards in Taiwan.

AKB48 released its 21st major-label single, "Everyday, Kachūsha", on May 25. An "election single", it contained ballots for determining who would headline the group's next single and set Japanese records for first-day (942,475 copies) and first-week sales (1,333,969 copies). On June 22, Oricon reported that for the first half of 2011 AKB48 topped the album sales charts and had the best- and second-best-selling singles ("Everyday, Kachūsha" and "Sakura no Ki ni Narō"). The group amassed ¥6.66 billion in merchandise sales.

On June 7, before its nationwide concert tour, AKB48 announced the creation of Team 4. The 16-member team would be captained by Mina Ōba, and the word "team" was dropped from "Team Kenkyūsei" for the group's alternates. Four days later the group announced at a handshake event that Aimi Eguchi, who supposedly auditioned for NMB48, would join AKB48 as a trainee. It later became known that Eguchi was not a real person, but a composite of AKB48 members' facial features created to promote Glico's Ice no Mi. On June 28, AKB48 producer Yasushi Akimoto announced plans to create another group as AKB48's "official rival". Nogizaka46 (乃木坂46) would debut with about 20 members, and Akimoto would join Sony Music Japan to produce the new group.

AKB48 released its 22nd single, "Flying Get" (フライングゲット, Furaingugetto), on August 24. It sold 1,025,952 copies on its first day, and became the group's fourth single to sell over a million copies (1.354 million) in its first week. On September 20, AKB48 held its second rock-paper-scissors tournament to determine the lineup for the group's 24th single. The group's 23rd single, "Kaze wa Fuiteiru", was released on October 26 and sold 1,045,937 copies on its first day. The next single, "Ue kara Mariko" (released on December 7), sold 1.199 million copies in its first week.

At the end of 2011, AKB48 topped seven of 16 Oricon rankings: total sales by an artist, copies sold for a single, total sales for a single, total sales by an artist (for singles), copies sold for a music Blu-ray disc, total sales for a music Blu-ray disc and total Blu-ray sales by an artist. The group set records for the most million-selling singles in a year, best-selling single by a female group and highest-earning female group. AKB48 won the Grand Prix in the 53rd Japan Record Awards for "Flying Get".

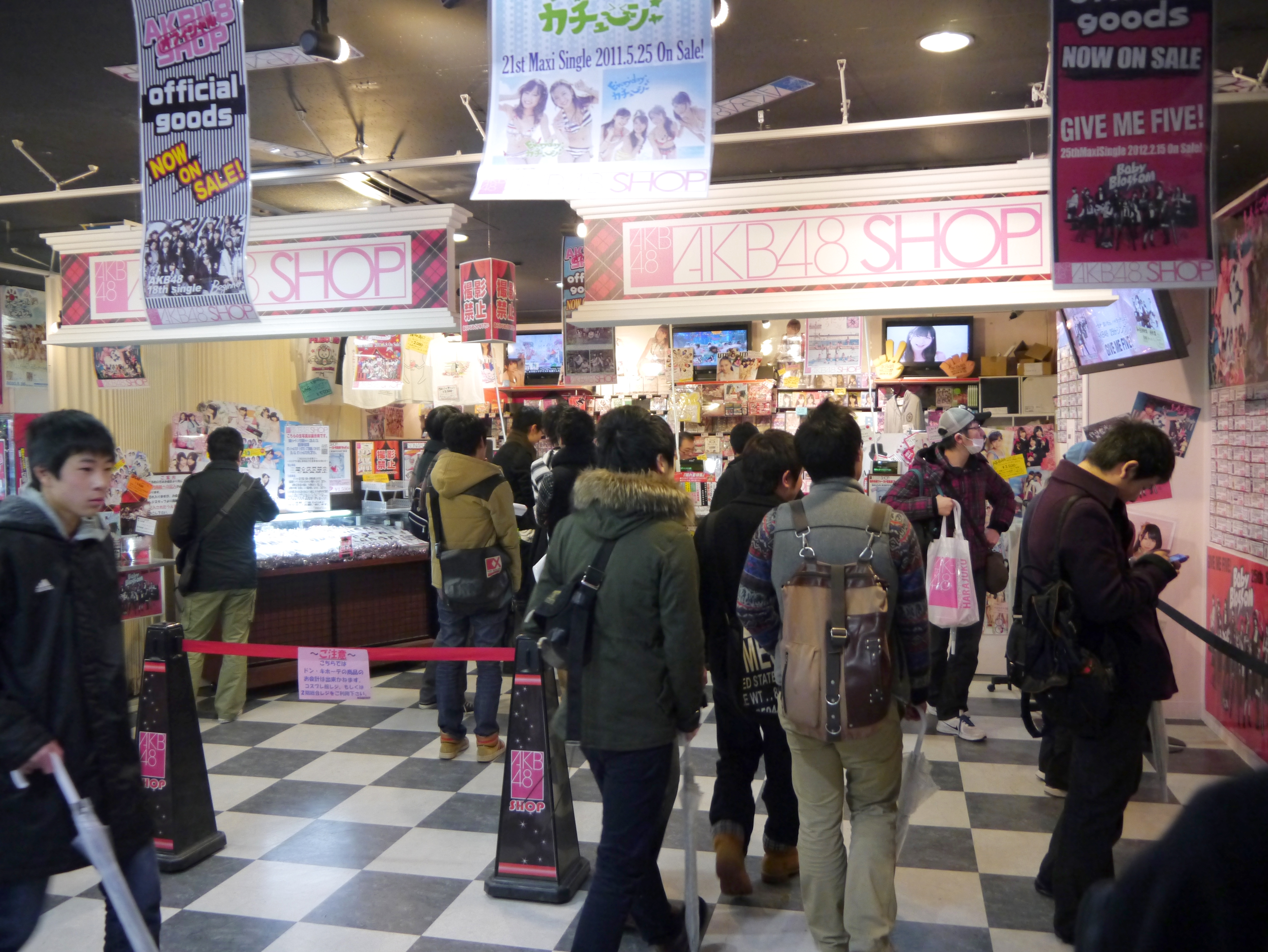
AKB48 Shop in Akihabara selling "Everyday, Kachūsha" and "Give Me Five!" merchandise in March 2012

Oricon announced on January 6, 2012, that AKB48 had sold 11,787,000 copies of its CD singles, surpassing girl group Morning Musume's Japanese record for a female group of 11,774,000. On January 22 (the final day of its "AKB48 Request Hour Set List Best 100 2012" concert series at Tokyo Dome City Hall) AKB48 members performed the new "Give Me Five!" as Baby Blossom, playing guitars, keyboards, percussion and horns. The Baby Blossom members had spent five months learning to play musical instruments, and some had little (or no) previous experience. "Give Me Five!" was released on February 15.

AKB48's second documentary film, Documentary of AKB48: Show Must Go On Shōjo-tachi wa Kizutsuki Nagara, Yume wo Miru, opened on January 27 in seventh place at the box office and grossed nearly $4 million by February 19. An anime series, AKB0048, was developed by Satelight and aired from April 29 to July 22. It was directed by Yoshimasa Hiraike, with group producer Akimoto aiding with planning and supervision. Nine members of AKB48 and its sister groups voiced the main characters, singing its opening and closing themes as No Name.

After photographs with their boyfriends surfaced, Natsumi Hirajima and Rumi Yonezawa resigned from the group and were replaced by Jurina Matsui of SKE48 and Miyuki Watanabe of NMB48. On March 24 AKB48 announced that five trainees would be promoted to Team 4, expanding its roster to 16. It was also announced that the group would perform at the Tokyo Dome stadium, one of AKB48's main goals since it was founded.

On March 25, longtime headliner Atsuko Maeda announced her graduation from the group. AKB48 announced that Maeda would graduate after the Tokyo Dome concerts; her final performance (and graduation ceremony) took place in the AKB48 theater on August 27, and was streamed live on YouTube.

On March 26 AKB48 announced an election for the lineup for the group's 27th major-label single, "Gingham Check". The candidates were 243 members of AKB48, SKE48, NMB48 and HKT48, and ballots were included with the group's 26th single ("Manatsu no Sounds Good!"). The election was held June 6 at Nippon Budokan, with the results telecast live. Yuko Oshima finished first, followed by Mayu Watanabe and Yuki Kashiwagi.

On April 23 AKB48 announced the creation of its third overseas sister group, SNH48, based in Shanghai. It was announced on June 17 that Rino Sashihara would be transferred to HKT48 in July as a "restart" because of an alleged scandal involving her ex-boyfriend. On June 24 AKB48 announced the promotion of six trainees from the 10th and 11th generations and its third rock-paper-scissors tournament (scheduled for September 18) to determine the lineup for the group's 29th single, "Eien Pressure".

On August 15 the group released its second studio album, 1830m, and on August 24 (the first day of its Tokyo Dome concert series) AKB48 announced a reorganization of its teams. Team 4 was dissolved, with its members transferred to the other three teams. Aika Ōta was transferred to HKT48, Aki Takajō and Haruka Nakagawa to Jakarta-based JKT48 and Sae Miyazawa and Mariya Suzuki to SNH48. Minami Takahashi became general manager of AKB48, with Mariko Shinoda replacing her as Team A captain. Yuko Oshima became Team K captain, and Ayaka Umeda captain of Team B.

=== 2012–2014: Tsugi no Ashiato ===
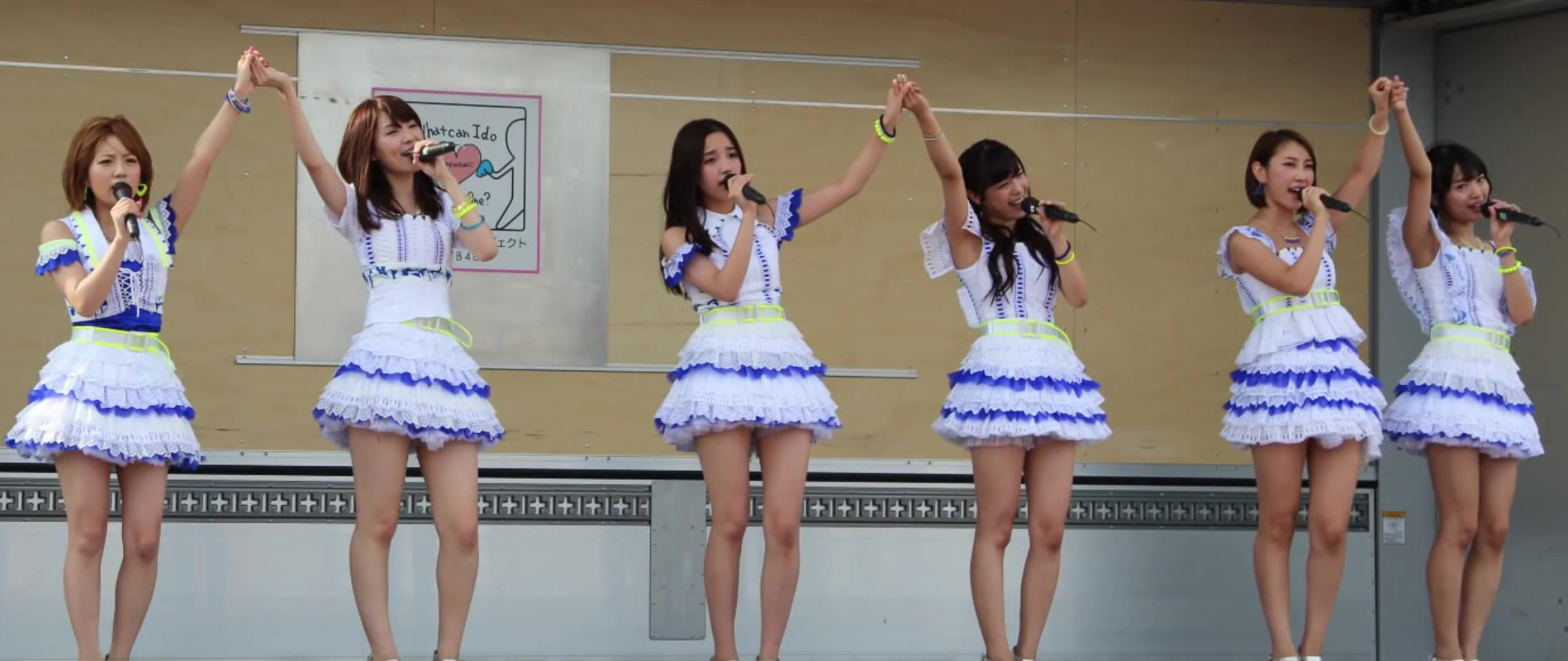
AKB48 in Tokyo in 2013

AKB48 recorded "Sugar Rush" for the 2012 Disney animated film, Wreck-It Ralph, and the group set a Guinness World Record for the most pop singers in a video game (its dating simulation game, AKB1/149 Ren'ai Sōsenkyo). It won a second consecutive Japan Record Award, for "Manatsu no Sounds Good!". The group was the number one artist by total sales revenue in Japan in 2012, with ¥19.098 billion. The AKB0048 anime series was renewed for a second season, AKB0048 Next Stage, and aired from January 5 to March 30, 2013. In January 2013 AKB48 played its Request Hour Set List Best 100 concert at Tokyo Dome City Hall, announcing future shows at Nippon Budokan and Nissan Stadium (the first show by a female artist at the latter). On February 1, the film Documentary of AKB48: No Flower Without Rain: Shōjo Tachi wa Namida no Ato ni Nani o Miru?. opened in tenth place at the box office, and grossed $2.2 million by February 17. During a meet-and-greet event for the film, first-generation member Tomomi Itano announced that she was leaving the group. On April 28, after a Nippon Budokan concert, AKB48's general manager announced another reorganization of the teams (including the girls who were also members of its sister groups). Nito Moeno and Tomomi Kasai also made their final appearances with the group.

AKB48 released its 31st single, "Sayonara Crawl" (an election single), on May 22. It sold more than 1.9 million copies in its first month, breaking Speed's White Love 1997 record for the highest single sales by a female group. The election candidates were 246 girls from AKB48, its sister groups and former members. On June 8 the results were broadcast on Fuji TV and streamed live on YouTube, the latter with Japanese and English commentary. The winner was HKT48 member Rino Sashihara, a former member of AKB48. During the event, Team A captain Mariko Shinoda (who placed fifth) announced that she would leave the group in July. On July 31, during AKB48's summer concert series at the Sapporo Dome, guest and former group headliner Atsuko Maeda sang her new solo single ("Time Machine Nante Iranai").

On August 21 the group released its 32nd single, "Koisuru Fortune Cookie". Its music video had 3,800 extras, the most for any AKB48- and sister group-related video. On August 24 the group announced the restoration of Team 4, with Minami Minegishi as captain and members promoted from the 13th and 14th generation of trainees.

On September 18, AKB48 held its annual rock-paper-scissors tournament at Nippon Budokan to determine the lineup for its 34th single, with Jurina Matsui the winner. After the event the group announced the lineup and performed its 33rd single, "Heart Electric", which was released in October. Its music video was directed by Shusuke Kaneko, known for the Heisei Gamera trilogy Godzilla, Mothra and King Ghidorah: Giant Monsters All-Out Attack and the live-action film version of Death Note. On December 11 the group released its 34th single, "Suzukake no Ki no Michi de 'Kimi no Hohoemi o Yume ni Miru' to Itte Shimattara Bokutachi no Kankei wa Dō Kawatte Shimau no ka, Bokunari ni Nan-nichi ka Kangaeta Ue de no Yaya Kihazukashii Ketsuron no Yō na Mono", and on December 31 longtime member Yuko Oshima announced on Kōhaku Uta Gassen that she was leaving the group. The group was the 2nd artist by total sales revenue in Japan in 2013, with ¥13.254 billion.

On January 22, 2014, AKB48 released the third studio album Tsugi no Ashiato. It reached number one on the weekly Oricon Albums Chart, selling 962,000 copies. The group's 35th single, "Mae shika Mukanee", was released on February 26 and sold 970,413 copies on its first day.

AKB48 announced plans for a fifth team, Team 8, with one member from each of Japan's 47 prefectures. On February 24, during the group's Grand Reformation Festival event at Zepp DiverCity Tokyo, the group announced a team reorganization. This included a captain and co-captain of each team, promotion of AKB48 trainees to regular membership (with assignment to the four teams) and the transfer of members between AKB48 and its sister groups. On April 3 AKB48 introduced its 47-member Team 8 as "the idols who come to you". (Note: The debut of Team 8 was the first time the group has featured an idol from the Ishikawa, Tottori, Toyama, Tokushima, Yamagata, Okayama, Kōchi, and Okinawa prefectures.) Akimoto announced auditions for an Otona adult member over 30 years old, to participate in events and be the centerpiece of a Glico Papico commercial. On April 16, AKB48 announced the Otona member: Mariko Tsukamoto, a 37-year-old housewife and mother of two.

On May 21 the group released its 36th single, "Labrador Retriever", which sold over 1,462,000 copies on its first day.

On June 7, AKB48 and its related groups announced the results of the annual election to determine the lineup for its 37th single. The winner was Mayu Watanabe with 159,854 votes, and Rino Sashihara was runner-up with 141,954 votes. The top eighty candidates were ranked in five groups of sixteen.

In August, AKB48 announced the Baito AKB project, which allows girls to join AKB48 part-time using the job search site Baitoru. 13,246 girls applied for Baito AKB, and after several screening rounds, 53 girls were selected to sign a five-month contract with a possible three-month extension in February. After the end of the project, 11 of the former Baito AKB members entered the yearly Draft Kaigi event aiming to become full members, while others expressed their desire to take part in the auditions for the newly planned NGT48 group.

On December 8, long-time member and general manager Minami Takahashi announced she will leave the group in December 2015 for the group's tenth anniversary. She recommended that Team K captain Yui Yokoyama be her successor.

The group ranked second overall in Oricon's Artist Total Sales Revenue for the 2014 year, with ¥13.075 billion.

==== Assault at handshake event ====
At a May 25, 2014 handshake event at the Iwate Industry Culture and Convention Center in Takizawa, Iwate, group members Rina Kawaei, Anna Iriyama and a staff member were attacked by a 24-year-old man with a handsaw. The suspect was arrested for attempted murder, (Note: The assailant was revealed to be an unemployed man who had no previous interest or fan connection to AKB48. He was frustrated that such idols were well-paid. In December 2014, he pleaded guilty to charges of bodily injury and infringement of weapon regulations.: 「AKBに特別な思い入れない」と供述. NHK (in Japanese). May 26, 2014. Archived from the original on May 26, 2014.; AKB襲撃:容疑者の母「大変なことをした」 携帯通じず. Manichi (in Japanese). May 26, 2015. Archived from the original on May 25, 2014.; "Man who attacked AKB48 members with saw pleads guilty". The Japan Times. November 5, 2014.) and the three were treated at a hospital for fractures and cuts. AKB48 canceled its theater performances through the end of May, and handshake and photo-shoot fan events in May and June were postponed. In response to security concerns, the Manseibashi Police Station of the Tokyo Metropolitan Police Department asked AKS to conduct security checks of audience members at the theater entrance. The man eventually pleaded guilty to charges of bodily injury. Although sister groups SKE48, NMB48 and HKT48 did not suspend their theater performances, they introduced security measures: metal detectors, not using the theaters' front rows, suspending post-performance "high-five" events and increasing the number of security guards. On May 30, AKB48 resumed its television appearances, and on June 2, the group resumed theater performances with security measures similar to those of its sister groups. Security and bag checks were added at the general-election-results event and Yuko Oshima's graduation concert.

=== 2015: Koko ga Rhodes da, Koko de Tobe! and 0 to 1 no Aida ===
On January 21, 2015, the group released its fourth studio album, Koko ga Rhodes da, Koko de Tobe!. On March 4, the group released the single "Green Flash". The group became the first group who sold their 20 consecutive singles in 1 million on the first week. On March 26, member Rina Kawaei announced her graduation from the group in order to continue her acting career on her own, stating that the previous incident and long period of rest brought her to reflect on her future without depending on the group.

On May 10, AKB48 was invited to the annual Japan Day festival in New York, their second performance in the city since 2009. A small away team consisting of members Rina Hirata, Ryoka Oshima, Haruna Kojima, Tomu Mutou, Saho Iwatate and Rina Nozawa performed a total of five songs cheered by a crowd of 5000 attendees.

On May 20, the group released the single "Bokutachi wa Tatakawanai".

June 6 saw the announcement of the seventh general election results. The event was broadcast live from Fukuoka Dome on Fuji TV, which reported an average viewer rating of 18.8% with a peak of 23.4%. A record 3.2 million votes were cast, with Rino Sashihara winning the poll for the second time with a record 194,049 votes.

On August 26, the group released the single "Halloween Night".

On October 25, 2015, during the handshake and autograph event at Pacific Yokohama had announced the details of AKB48's 42nd Single and Request Hour 2016. The 42nd single was released on December 9, 2015. Minami Takahashi was the Center in her final appearance on an AKB48 single.

On November 18, the group released its third compilation album, 0 to 1 no Aida. This album marks the 10th anniversary of Japanese group, founded in 2005.

The group's 42nd single "Kuchibiru ni Be My Baby" sold 813,044 copies on its first day of release. This brought their combined single sales to over 36,158,000 single albums sold, making them the artist with the highest number of single album sales in Japan, surpassing rock group B'z.

=== 2016–2017: Thumbnail ===
On January 24, 2016, during the final day of the Request Hour 2016 at Tokyo Dome City, AKB48 performed their 43rd single "Kimi wa Melody" which released on March 9, 2016. Kimi Wa Melody is the second single to bring back graduates Atsuko Maeda, Yuko Oshima, Mariko Shinoda and Tomomi Itano being featured on the main track. The single was centred by Sakura Miyawaki being her first time to have a solo centre on an AKB48 track.

In February 2016, a Taiwanese girl Chia-ling Ma was added to the group as "Taiwan Kenkyūsei". This is the first foreign member in the group.

On June 1, 2016, the group released the 44th single "Tsubasa wa Iranai", the single included ballots for the group's General Election for that year. Results of the election were announced on June 18 at the Hard Off Eco Stadium in Niigata on BS Sky TV Premium and Fuji TV, where Rino Sashihara placed first with 243,011 votes. On August 31, the group released the 45th single "LOVE TRIP / Shiawase wo Wakenasai".

On October 3, Haruka Shimazaki announced her graduation from AKB48 during a new TV commercial presentation of Baitoru. On November 16, the group released the 46th single "High Tension".

On December 12, Mayu Watanabe, Rina Izuta and Saya Kawamoto announced a new subsidiary to the AKB48 group known as 'AKB48 China' during a Shanghai press conference and fan meet. Unlike the established Shanghai sister group SNH48, AKB48 China will act as bridge between Japan and China, bringing Japanese members to the upcoming AKB48 China Theatre. Upcoming promotions include a television drama being filmed and a new online game.

On January 25, 2017, the group released the fifth studio album Thumbnail. On March 15, the group released their 47th single "Shoot Sign", and Haruna Kojima announced she would be graduating. On May 31, the group released their 48th single Negaigoto no Mochigusare, which contained ballots for the general election. Rino Sashihara won the poll for the third consecutive year, this time with 246,376 votes, and served as the center performer for their 49th single "#sukinanda", released on August 30. On November 22, their 50th single "11gatsu no Anklet" was released. At the December 2017 team shuffle event, it was announced that the Team 8 members are to hold concurrent positions (kennin (兼任)) with one of the other AKB48 Teams A, K, B, and 4. Mayu Watanabe graduated from the group at the end of the year.

=== 2018–2021: Produce 48, impact of COVID-19 pandemic ===
In June, 39 members of AKB48 and their sister groups participated in the South Korean television competition Produce 48, from which Iz*One was formed. Sakura Miyawaki, Nako Yabuki, Hitomi Honda finished high enough to earn a spot in the group. For the first time, Jurina Matsui topped the 10th installment of the AKB48 general elections with 194,453 votes. In July, the RIAJ certified "Teacher Teacher" as a triple million, making the group the first girl group to achieve it. Shortly after Produce 48, Stone Music Entertainment and Genie Music signed a deal with King Records and AKS and became the official digital distributors of AKB singles in South Korea. On March 13, 2019, the group's 55th single "Jiwaru Days" was released, with Rino Sashihara serving as the center performer in her last single with AKB48. The single's third song arose from a collaboration between AKB48, Nogizaka46 and Iz*One. On September 18, 2019, the group released the 56th single "Sustainable", their first release of the Reiwa period and first in six months. On October 19, 2019, AKB48 held a concert in Taipei Arena with AKB48 Team TP.

Following the assault on NGT48 member Maho Yamaguchi, the management of AKB48 faced severe public criticism. The year 2019 marked some major changes for the group, as AKBingo and AKB48 Show!, two long running nationally broadcast variety shows featuring the group, were eventually cancelled. The Akihabara-based AKB48 Cafe and Shop was closed after eight years of operation. In 2019, three regular annual events were discontinued, including the general election, according to the AKS then-board director "because it exhausted its set purpose after its 10th iteration". For the first time in the group's history, only two singles were released in a year. 2020 began with the announcement of plans to significantly change AKB48 management structures, with individual companies independently running each of the Japanese groups. On March 18, 2020, the group released the 57th single "Shitsuren, Arigatō".

In April 2020, in response to the COVID-19 pandemic and the resulting stay-at-home order, the group launched the OUC48 project, named after the Japanese word for "home", o-uchi (お家), where the members perform regular stage plays from their own homes using group video chat, which is broadcast in real time via YouTube. This project is an expansion of an earlier video montage of 103 members singing "365 Nichi no Kami Hikōki" from their homes, personally edited into a single video by General Manager Mion Mukaichi, which was received favorably. They did not participate in the NHK's 71st Kōhaku Uta Gassen due to COVID-19.

On May 22, 2021, the last 1st Generation member, Minami Minegishi held her graduation concert entitled Minegishi Minami Graduation Concert ～Sakura no Sakanai Haru Wanai～ on Pia Arena MM. Also, Team 8 held the last leg of their Team 8 National Tour ~47 no Suteki na Machi e~ in Kanagawa, marking the official return of Hitomi Honda to AKB from her Iz*One activities. And, they also held their Tandoku Concert, performing 48 songs non-stop, with the setlist being made by Yuki Kashiwagi. In that concert, the long-awaited 58th single was finally announced, "Nemohamo Rumor" with the senbatsu also being an AKB-only senbatsu, a first since Chance no Junban in 2010. Yui Yokoyama announced her graduation from the group September 12, her graduation concert will be held on December 9 at AKB48 Theater.

On December 8, 2021, at their 16th Anniversary concert, the group announced auditions for their 17th Generation. On top of this, a Team Shuffle was also announced, with the changes taking effect on February 6, 2022. Mion Mukaichi, Manaka Taguchi, Nanami Asai and Narumi Kuranoo were appointed captains of Team A, K, B and 4 respectively. On December 12, long-time member Miho Miyazaki announced her graduation from the group. Four days later, on December 16, Rena Kato announced her graduation from the group. They both graduated in February 2022.

=== 2022–present: Comeback after COVID-19, transfer to Universal Music Group and 20th Anniversary ===
On February 23, 2022, the group announced their 59th single "Motokare Desu" during the group's television show AKB48, Saikin Kiita? with Hitomi Honda serving as center position. This single would be sung by 20 members of AKB-only senbatsu and released on May 18, 2022.

On May 4, 2022, 11 new trainees from 17th generation members were introduced to the public for the first time. On October 9, 2022, the group announced auditions for their 18th Generation, and released their 60th single "Hisashiburi no Lip Gloss" on October 19, 2022, with Erii Chiba serving as the center for the single. On February 27, 2023, AKB48 announced that their 61st single "Doushitemo Kimi ga Suki da" will be released on April 26, 2023, and Hitomi Honda will serve the center position for the single, they also announced on YouTube that they will work with Universal Music Group (through their EMI Records banner) from now on. On April 9, 2023, 8 new trainees from 18th generation made their debut at the Theater. On April 29, 2023, the group announced that they are ending their team and captain system, with the last performances for the current teams to be held in August 2023. On July 28, 2023, AKB48 announced that their 62nd single will be released on September 27, 2023, and Yui Oguri will serve the center position for the single.

On October 20, 2023, long-time member Yuki Kashiwagi announced her graduation at AKB48's Nippon Budokan 3-day concert. Her graduation concert was held on March 16, 2024 at Pia Arena MM and her last official activity with the group was concluded in April. On October 22, at the final day of AKB48's Nippon Budokan concert, the group announced auditions for their 19th Generation. On December 8, AKB48 announced at AKB48 Theater's 18th anniversary that they will release their 63rd single on 13 March 2024, which also served as Yuki Kashiwagi's graduation single, marking her first time serving as the solo center for the single, and her second overall after serving as a double center in Green Flash in 2015.

On October 6, 2024, AKB48 announces their cover album and tenth overall Nantettatte AKB48 to be released on December 25, 2024, with Yuiri Murayama serving the center position for the album. On 20 December 2024, the group's 20th Generation members were unveiled at the theatre. Their 65th single "Masaka no Confession", released on 2 April 2025, was centered by trainee Azuki Yagi, marking the first time an AKB48 single was centered by a trainee.

AKB48's 66th single "Oh My Pumpkin!", centered by Yui Oguri, was released on 13 August 2025 as part of the group's 20th anniversary celebrations. As such, the single also involved members from each current overseas sister groups, as well as graduated members Atsuko Maeda, Minami Takahashi, Haruna Kojima and Rino Sashihara, the first time graduated members has taken part in a single since Kimi wa Melody in 2016. In December 2025, it was also confirmed that other graduated members will also be invited to perform at the group's 20th anniversary concerts at Nippon Budokan, AKB48 also announced that they will participate in the 76th NHK Kōhaku Uta Gassen for the first time in 6 years.

== AKB48 Group ==
AKB48 has sister groups created domestically and overseas, which are collectively referred to as AKB48 Group.

Group name	Full name	Country	Status	Franchise
AKB48	Akihabara48	Japan	Active	AKB48 Group
SKE48	Sakae48	Japan	Active	AKB48 Group
NMB48	Namba48	Japan	Active	AKB48 Group
HKT48	Hakata48	Japan	Active	AKB48 Group
NGT48	Niigata48	Japan	Active	AKB48 Group
STU48	Setouchi48	Japan	Active	AKB48 Group
SDN48	Saturday Night48	Japan	Disbanded	AKB48 Group
JKT48	Jakarta48	Indonesia	Active	AKB48 Group
SNH48	Shanghai48	China	Active	AKB48 Group (until 2016)
BNK48	Bangkok48	Thailand	Active	AKB48 Group
CGM48	Chiang Mai48	Thailand	Active	AKB48 Group
MNL48	Manila48	Philippines	Disbanded	AKB48 Group
TSH48	Team Shanghai48	China	Active	AKB48 Group
TPE48	Taipei48	Taiwan	Active	AKB48 Group
KLP48	Kuala Lumpur48	Malaysia	Active	AKB48 Group
SGO48	Saigon48	Vietnam	Disbanded	AKB48 Group
DEL48	Delhi48	India	Disbanded	AKB48 Group
MUB48	Mumbai48	India	Disbanded	AKB48 Group

== Musical style ==
Andrew Joyce and Kenneth Maxwell of The Wall Street Journal described the music as "sugar-sweet pop tunes and sometimes-suggestive lyrics". During AKB48 performances, "members perform a revue of simply choreographed routines in front of a roughly 95-percent-male audience. The music is typical Japanese pop: fast-paced numbers with high-pitched, singalong choruses."

== Promotion and media ==
AKB48 and its sister groups boost their record sales by a variety of marketing strategies. The main track for each single is recorded by a team of "All Stars" (選抜, senbatsu; selection) consisting of popular members from AKB48's teams and, in earlier years, its sister groups, with one of the girls selected as the center performer or Center. This creates a competitive atmosphere between members and fan groups. The singles and albums are released in different editions and types with alternate album-cover pictures, B-side tracks, video DVDs, collectible member pictures, and voting codes for several annual election contests. Record purchases come with tickets for fan meetings, including handshake events or photo sessions. Customers can choose the members they want to meet in an online pre-order system. All these strategies motivate fans to buy more than one copy of each release. Alan Swarts of MTV Japan has noted that collectors purchasing multiple copies of AKB48 CDs have inflated the market, and is one of the reasons Japan's music industry has been booming.

=== Events ===
The group has publicized special events to choose the promotional and recording lineups for some of its singles. In 2009, the concept of senbatsu sōsenkyo (選抜総選挙; "selection general election") was introduced, which allowed fans to vote their favorite members into the promotional line up for one of their annual singles. Ballots are obtained by purchasing the group's latest "election single", or, alternatively, through the group's mobile app products and fan club subscriptions. Top vote-getting members are heavily promoted, with the winner getting the centerpiece of the group's live performances of the single. The total pool of votes counted has exceeded three million votes for individual events since 2015. Fans have reportedly bought hundreds of copies of singles to vote for their favorite members.

Another selection method, AKB48's rock-paper-scissors tournaments, was introduced in 2010 for the group's 19th single ("Chance no Junban") and has recurred as an annual event. Members of AKB48 and its sister groups compete in the knockout tournament to be part of the recording and promotional lineup for the group's next single, with participants wearing a variety of costumes. Starting with 2014, the tournament does not determine the promotional line up of a single anymore. Instead, the winner would debut as a soloist or, if she was already a soloist, would perform a solo concert.

AKB48 has also used the general election scheme to determine set lists for an annual Request Hour (リクエストアワー, rikuesuto awā) show. Other annual events include an AKB48 group only version of Kōhaku Uta Gassen and the AKB group draft meeting (AKB48グループ ドラフト会議, AKB48 gurūpu dorafuto kaigi), in which all teams from any of the sister groups chose new members from a pre-selected group of applicants.

In 2019, the general election, the Janken tournament, and Kōhaku Uta Gassen were not held.

=== Documentaries ===
Four AKB48 documentaries have been released in theaters since 2011. The first, Documentary of AKB48 – To Be Continued, was released in Japan on January 22, 2011 and on DVD in North America on December 1. The second, Documentary of AKB48: Show Must Go On Shōjo-tachi wa Kizutsuki Nagara, Yume wo Miru, was released on January 27, 2012 and earned $3,984,152 at the Japanese box office. The third, Documentary of AKB48: No Flower Without Rain: Shōjo Tachi wa Namida no Ato ni Nani o Miru?, was released on February 2, 2013 and earned $2,269,118 at the Japanese box office. The fourth, Documentary of AKB48 The Time has come Shōjo-tachi wa, Ima, Sono Senaka ni Nani wo Omou?, was released on July 4, 2014 and (as of July 13, 2014) grossed $984,757 at the Japanese box office. Each film chronicled events and issues encountered by the group during the previous year. The most recent film was Sonzai Suru Riy: Documentary of AKB48 was released on July 8, 2016.

=== Manga and anime ===
The manga AKB49: Ren'ai Kinshi Jōrei revolves around AKB48, featuring group members in the story as supporting characters.

The 2012 anime series AKB0048 is a science-fiction series based on the group, with production supervised by Yasushi Akimoto. Nine characters in the anime are voiced by members of AKB48 and its sister groups. First airing in Japan in the spring of 2012, a second season was broadcast in 2013.

A manga titled AKB48 Murder Case (AKB48 殺人事件), published in nine chapters in manga magazine Weekly Shōnen Sunday in the summer of 2012, conceived by Yasushi Akimoto, written by Case Closed (Detective Conan) creator Gosho Aoyama and drawn by Masaki Gotou, was part of a promotional campaign for Ezaki Glico's Ice no Mi fruit candy ice confection. The campaign also featured a series of commercials and a website. Atsuko Maeda, about to graduate from the group and dreaming of a career as a private detective, has to find out which of the many girls in AKB48 is responsible for the murders of three of the groups' best-known members.

=== Video games ===
The group has its own visual novel-dating sim series. In the first installment, AKB1/48: Idol to Koishitara... (released December 23, 2010), the player engages in a relationship with one of the members. The second installment, AKB1/48: Idol to Guam de Koishitara... (released October 10, 2011, with a similar storyline) is set in Guam. The third installment, AKB1/149 Ren'ai Sōsenkyo (released December 20, 2012), expands the scenarios to AKB48 sister groups SKE48, NMB48 and HKT48. The three games were released for PlayStation Portable, with Ren'ai Sousenkyo also released for PlayStation Vita and PlayStation 3. In 2014 Namco Bandai developed Sailor Zombie: AKB48 Arcade Edition, as a tie-in for the television drama going by the same name, in which AKB48 members are also the main cast. In this arcade game, the player must use a light gun to shoot vaccine bullets at zombified AKB48 members. The game includes a rhythm game in which the zombie idols dance. In April 2014, a rhythm game was released for Android and iOS, in which the players select their favourite line up and may compete in various community events. In 2012, AKB48+Me was published for the Nintendo 3DS, which let the players try to become a member of AKB48. An ad for Super Smash Bros. for Nintendo 3DS also featured Miis of the group, specifically showing off former members Yuki Kashiwagi, Mayu Watanabe and Minami Takahashi.

=== Other media ===
AKB48's producers have developed several television shows to promote the group. AKBingo!, AKB48 Show!, AKB to XX, and Nemōsu TV were variety shows. The Majisuka Gakuen series and Sakura Karano Tegami feature group members in dramatic roles. Outside the self-developed house shows, members of AKB48 have appeared in high-profile programs such as Mecha-Mecha Iketeru!, Waratte Iitomo! or SMAPxSMAP. Members frequently appear in gravure magazines. Since 2016, the streaming platform 'Showroom' collaborates with the AKB48 group and offers a steady supply of rotating group members streaming in private situations. AKB48 will open their community on Hybe's global fan platform Weverse from April 27, 2023, their Weverse DM services will start on May 2, and 16 AKB48 61st single's senbatsu idols will join first.

== Reception ==
Tower Records Japan CEO Ikuo Minewaki described AKB48 as a popular act, and the group has been characterized as a social phenomenon in Japan. In 2012 AKB48 had record sales in Japan of over $226 million. Total sales of over $128 million were reported for 2013, and of over $96 million in 2015. According to Oricon, as of January 6, 2012, AKB48 sold a total of 11,787,000 singles, setting a record for "the most singles sold in Japan by a female group". The group's last 35 singles have topped the weekly Oricon Singles Chart. In 2010 "Beginner" and "Heavy Rotation" placed first and second, respectively, on the list of Japan's bestselling singles of the year; From 2010 to 2019, AKB48's singles have occupied at least the top two, and sometimes the top four or five spots of the Oricon Yearly Singles Chart. By June 2018, the group has sold over 60 million records, including over 6 million albums. AKB48 is the highest selling musical act in Japan in terms of singles sold. However, AKB48's 42nd single "Kuchibiru ni Be My Baby" failed to sell more than one million copies in the first week after its release, ending a run of single releases achieving this feat, starting with "Everyday, Katyusha" in 2011.

Beside CD sales, AKB48 enjoys commercial success in other areas as well. The group has six singles certificated by RIAJ for reaching a million downloads each. According to Joysound, AKB48 has been named the karaoke artist of the year for four years in a row (2011–2014). In 2011, eight positions of annual top 10 photobook sales were occupied by group members. In 2012, six members topped the individual rankings of advertisement campaigns. AKB48 is also one of the most viewed Japanese artists on YouTube.

AKB48 holds several Guinness World Records, including being recognized on December 1, 2010, as the "largest pop group" when it numbered 48 members. It set a record for "most same-product television endorsements within 24 hours" on February 28, 2012, after 90 group members appeared in 90 different commercials aired in the Kanto, Kansai and Tokai regions of Japan. Japanese ambassador to the United States Ichirō Fujisaki, on meeting the group during its visit to Washington, D.C., said that "AKB" stood for "adorable, kind and beautiful". On February 1, 2012, Japan Post issued a stamp commemorating the group.

== Controversies ==
One of the group's risqué music videos has been considered controversial. "Heavy Rotation"'s video was criticized by Western reporters for showing AKB48 members in lingerie and underwear, hugging, kissing and sharing a bath. Its director, Mika Ninagawa, said that she wanted to appeal to men and women with a creative, fun video because of the group's increasing popularity among girls. In an interview, she accepted responsibility for its content: "Mr. Akimoto left everything to me. He did not give me any tips at all...I tried to show how AKB48 is in real life, in the video. In the dressing room, they seemed very close to each other. Then I came up with the concept [of a] girls' high school."

In February 2013, group member Minami Minegishi had her head shaved and appeared in a YouTube video to apologise after it was reported by a tabloid that she had spent the night with a man in violation of her contract; she was demoted to the status of trainee. Although her shaved head was self-inflicted in an apologetic response to her fans and peers for her demotion, it was seen as an overreaction and attracted criticism of how the situation was handled.

A 2016 NHK documentary reported that the popularity of AKB48's handshake sessions may contribute to the decline of romantic relationships among young Japanese people, including "herbivore men", which triggered debates. According to the report, some fans would rather spend their time supporting their favourite idols than actively pursuing love interests.

In June 2026, it was announced member Mei Hanada's contract had been terminated effective immediately, the first instance of such within the group. Hanada had been on hiatus for several months beforehand, with the publicly stated reason being health concerns. In their official statement announcing Hanada's departure, AKB48 staff claimed that she had violated her contract through having a special relationship with a specific fan, and that she would only communicate to them through her lawyer. Hanada repeatedly claimed management had asked her to shave her head, mirroring Minami Minegishi's scandal, and later read out a statement about the situation on video appearing to have shaved her hair.

== Theater ==
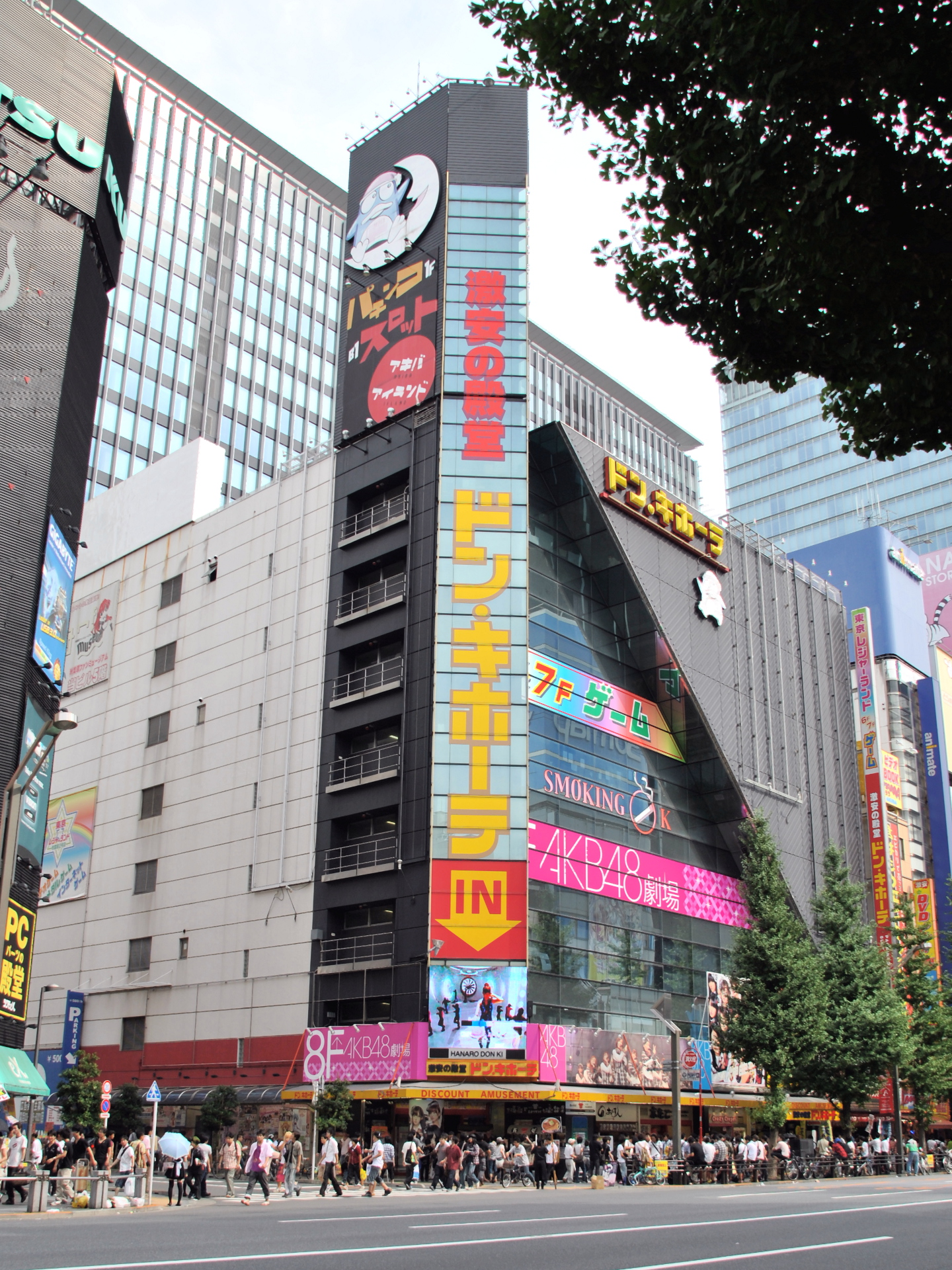
AKB48 Theater on the 8th floor

The AKB48 Theater (AKB48劇場) is a live performance venue created especially for performances by AKB48, based around the concept of AKB48 being "idols you can meet". The AKB48 Theater is located on the 8th Floor of the Don Quixote Akihabara Building in Kanda, Chiyoda City, Tokyo. The Theater has a capacity of 250 people (including standing audience members); the seats are located very close to the stage. Performances by the different AKB48 teams and by AKB48 trainees are held on a more or less daily basis, and the Theater is very popular with AKB48's enthusiastic fans.

AKB48 Theater had been temporarily closed for several reasons over the years, most recently due to the impact of the COVID-19 pandemic. A cafeteria & shop were open inside the theater since 2011, however they both closed after 8 years.

The current theater manager is Hiroshi Yuasa, and Shinobu Kayano is General Theater Manager of all 48 Groups.

To celebrate Atsuko Maeda's graduation from AKB48, a photo mosaic was created with 10,000 pictures sent by fans. The poster was displayed at AKB48 Theater between August 27 through September 3.

On 17 March 2024, it was announced that after 19 years of operations, the theatre will undergo renovations from September, with the last performance at the original theatre to be held on 1 September 2024. The new theater was officially opened on the day of AKB48's 19th anniversary on 8 December 2024. Changes include an increased seat count, revamped entrance area, as well as LED panels installed on the theater's iconic pillars

== Philanthropy ==
In February 2012 AKB48 said it would donate ¥580 million to the Japanese Red Cross, and later it was reported that the group had raised a total of over ¥1.25 billion for earthquake and tsunami relief. On March 8, 2013, the group released "Tenohira ga Kataru Koto", another song dedicated to the March 2011 disaster victims, on its website for free digital download. On the second anniversary of the disaster AKB48 and its sister groups visited the affected areas, performing at schools and the AKB48, SKE48, NMB48 and HKT48 theaters with proceeds aiding the ongoing recovery.

== Members ==
AKB48's line up has frequently changed due to departures, admissions, team rotations, and transfers between AKB48 and its various sister groups. The group consists of 45 active members, including 37 official members and 8 trainees who initially serve on specific teams as understudies until they are promoted. Some sister group members have held concurrent positions with AKB48 in the past, however, the practice has ended and since 2018, no sister group member has held a concurrent position with AKB48. Narumi Kuranoo is the current AKB48 captain and current general manager of AKB48 and its sister groups.

== Discography ==
- Koko ni Ita Koto (2011)
- 1830m (2012)
- Tsugi no Ashiato (2014)
- Koko ga Rhodes da, Koko de Tobe! (2015)
- Thumbnail (2017)
- Bokutachi wa, Ano Hi no Yoake wo Shitteiru (2018)
- Nantettatte AKB48 (2024)

== Awards and honors ==
The following table lists some of the major awards received by the group.

Year	Ceremony	Award	Nominated work	Result
2009	51st Japan Record Awards	Special Award		Won
2009	11th Mnet Asian Music Awards	Asia Recommended Award (Japan)	"River"	Won
2010	24th Japan Gold Disc Award	Special Award		Won
2010	Billboard Japan Music Awards	Top Pop Artists		Won
2010	GOOD DESIGN AWARD	Entertainment Project Design		Won
2011	25th Japan Gold Disc Award	Single of the Year	"Beginner"	Won
2011	25th Japan Gold Disc Award	The Best 5 singles	Beginner, Heavy Rotation, Ponytail to Shushu	Won
2011	Billboard Japan Music Awards	Artist of the Year		Won
2011	Billboard Japan Music Awards	Top Pop Artists		Won
2011	Billboard Japan Music Awards	Hot 100 of the Year	"Everyday, Katyusha"	Won
2011	53rd Japan Record Awards	Grand Prix	"Flying Get"	Won
2011	70th Television Drama Academy Awards	Best Theme Song Award	"Flying Get"	Won
2012	Billboard Japan Music Awards	Artist of the Year		Won
2012	Billboard Japan Music Awards	Top Pop Artists		Won
2012	Billboard Japan Music Awards	Hot 100 of the Year	"Manatsu no Sounds Good!"	Won
2012	Billboard Japan Music Awards	Hot 100 Singles Sales of the Year	"Manatsu no Sounds Good!"	Won
2012	54th Japan Record Awards	Grand Prix	"Manatsu no Sounds Good!"	Won
2012	26th Japan Gold Disc Award	Artist of the Year (Japan Domestic)		Won
2012	26th Japan Gold Disc Award	Single of the Year	"Everyday, Katyusha"	Won
2012	26th Japan Gold Disc Award	The Best 5 singles	Everyday, Katyusha, Kaze wa Fuiteiru, Sakura no Ki ni Narō, Chance no Junban, Flying Get	Won
2012	11th CCTV-MTV Music Award	The Asia's Most Popular Group (special award)		Won
2012	14th Mnet Asian Music Awards	Best Asian Artist Japan		Won
2013	Billboard Japan Music Awards	Artist of the Year		Won
2013	Billboard Japan Music Awards	Top Pop Artists		Won
2013	Billboard Japan Music Awards	Hot 100 of the Year	"Koi Suru Fortune Cookie"	Won
2013	27th Japan Gold Disc Award	Artist of the Year (Japan Domestic)		Won
2013	27th Japan Gold Disc Award	Single of the Year	"Manatsu no Sounds Good!"	Won
2013	27th Japan Gold Disc Award	Best 5 singles	Ue kara Mariko, Uza, Give Me Five!, Gingham Check, Manatsu no Sounds Good!	Won
2013	55th Japan Record Awards	Gold Award	"Koi Suru Fortune Cookie"	Won
2013	55th Japan Record Awards	Grand Prix	"Koi Suru Fortune Cookie"	Nominated
2014	56th Japan Record Awards	Grand Prix	"Labrador Retriever"	Nominated
2014	28th Japan Gold Disc Award	Artist of the Year (Japan Domestic)		Won
2014	28th Japan Gold Disc Award	Single of the Year	"Sayonara Crawl"	Won
2014	28th Japan Gold Disc Award	Best 5 singles	Eien Pressure, Koi Suru Fortune Cookie, Sayonara Crawl, Suzukake Nanchara, Heart Electric	Won
2014	47th Japan Cable Awards	Cable Music Excellence [Outstanding Performance] Award	"Kokoro no Placard"	Won
2014	18th space shower music video award	Special Award	"Koi Suru Fortune Cookie"	Won
2015	57th Japan Record Awards	Grand Prix	"Bokutachi wa Tatakawanai"	Nominated
2015	29th Japan Gold Disc Award	Single of the Year	"Labrador Retriever"	Won
2015	29th Japan Gold Disc Award	Album of the Year (Japan Domestic)	"Tsugi no Ashiato"	Won
2015	29th Japan Gold Disc Award	Best 5 singles	Kibōteki Refrain, Kokoro no Placard, Mae shika Mukanee, Labrador Retriever	Won
2015	29th Japan Gold Disc Award	Best 5 Albums	Tsugi no Ashiato	Won
2015	48th Japan Cable Awards	Cable Music Excellence [Outstanding Performance] Award	"Kuchibiru ni Be My Baby"	Won
2015	17th Mnet Asian Music Awards	Best Asian Artist Japan		Won
2015	The 3rd V Chart Awards	Favorite Artist Of The Year		Won
2015	The 3rd V Chart Awards	Top Group – Japan		Won
2016	Billboard Japan Music Awards	Artist of the year		Won
2016	Billboard Japan Music Awards	Hot 100 of the Year	"Tsubasa wa Iranai"	Won
2016	30th Japan Gold Disc Award	Single of the Year	"Bokutachi wa Tatakawanai"	Won
2016	30th Japan Gold Disc Award	Best 5 singles	Kuchibiru ni Be My Baby, Green Flash, Halloween Night, Bokutachi wa Tatakawanai	Won
2016	30th Japan Gold Disc Award	Best 5 Albums	"Koko ga Rhodes da, Koko de Tobe!" "0 to 1 no Aida"	Won
2016	11th Taisho Ryou Music Award	Grand Prix	"365 Nichi no Kamihikouki"	Won
2016	88th Television Drama Academy Awards	Best Theme Song Award	"365 Nichi no Kamihikouki"	Won
2016	8th Dahsyatnya Awards	Best Guest Award (Bintang Tamu Terdahsyat)		Won
2017	31st Japan Gold Disc Award	Single of the Year	"Tsubasa wa Iranai"	Won
2017	31st Japan Gold Disc Award	Best 5 singles	Kimi wa Melody, Tsubasa wa Iranai, High Tension, Love Trip / Shiawase o Wakenasai	Won
2017	19th Mnet Asian Music Awards	Best Asian Artist Japan		Won
2018	32nd Japan Gold Disc Award	Single of the Year	"Negaigoto no Mochigusare"	Won
2018	32nd Japan Gold Disc Award	Best 5 singles	11gatsu no Anklet, Shoot Sign, Negaigoto no Mochigusare, #SukiNanda	Won
2018	32nd Japan Gold Disc Award	Best 5 Albums	"Thumbnail"	Won
2018	60th Japan Record Awards	Grand Prix	"Teacher Teacher"	Nominated
2018	Billboard Japan Music Awards	Top Singles Sales of the Year	"Teacher Teacher"	Won
2019	61st Japan Record Awards	Grand Prix	"Sustainable"	Nominated
2019	33rd Japan Gold Disc Award	Single of the Year	"Teacher Teacher"	Won
2019	33rd Japan Gold Disc Award	Best 5 singles	Sentimental Train, Teacher Teacher, No Way Man	Won
2019	33rd Japan Gold Disc Award	Best 5 Albums	"Bokutachi wa, Ano Hi no Yoake o Shitteiru"	Won
2020	34th Japan Gold Disc Award	Single of the Year	"Sustainable"	Won
2020	34th Japan Gold Disc Award	Best 5 singles	Sustainable, Jiwaru Days	Won
2021	35th Japan Gold Disc Award	Best 5 singles	Shitsuren, Arigatō	Won
2021	63rd Japan Record Awards	Grand Prix	Nemohamo Rumor	Nominated
2021	63rd Japan Record Awards	Excellent Work Award	Nemohamo Rumor	Won

=== Records set ===
The group and its songs have set the following records:

- Guinness World Record for Largest Pop Group — In November 2010, Guinness named AKB48 the world's largest pop group.
- Guinness World Record for Most Number of Pop Singers Featured in a Video Game — In December 2012, the group's dating simulation game AKB1/149 Ren'ai Sōsenkyo featured 149 members.
- Guinness World Record for Broadcasting the Most Same-Product Television Endorsements Within 24 Hours — In February 2012 AKB48 members appeared in 90 commercials for Asahi's Wonda Coffee Morning Shot, breaking the previous record of 60 commercials.
- Most singles sold in Japan by a female artist — In May 2013, after the release of the group's 31st single ("Sayonara Crawl"), combined sales figures for AKB48 singles reached 21.852 million since its 2006 debut in 2006 (breaking Ayumi Hamasaki's previous record of 21.416 million).
- Highest Japanese sales of a female-group single — In June 2013 "Sayonara Crawl"'s sales reached 1,872,000 copies, breaking Speed's 1997 record for "White Love". The single's total sales reached 1,955,800.
- Most consecutive million-selling singles sold in Japan — In October 2013 AKB48's 33rd single ("Heart Electric") sold 1,021,000 copies on its first day, becoming the group's 14th consecutive million-selling single and breaking the previous record of 13 held by B'z.
- Most million-selling singles in Japan — In December 2013, the group's 34th single ("Suzukake no Ki no Michi de "Kimi no Hohoemi o Yume ni Miru" to Itte Shimattara Bokutachi no Kankei wa Dō Kawatte Shimau no ka, Bokunari ni Nan-nichi ka Kangaeta Ue de no Yaya Kihazukashii Ketsuron no Yō na Mono") sold 1,033,000 copies during its first week. AKB48's 16th million-selling single, it broke the previous record held by B'z for 13 years and nine months.
- Highest Japanese sales of a female single — In June 2017, the group's 48th single ("Negaigoto no Mochigusare") sold 2,555,912 copies during its first week. It broke the previous record held by Dreams Come True.
- Highest Japanese single sales of a musical act — AKB48's 60 singles' total sales reached 73.5 million copies.

== See also ==
- AKB0048
- Oricon
- Count Down TV
- Japan Record Awards
- Billboard Japan Music Awards
- Kōhaku Uta Gassen
- List of best-selling girl groups
- Handshake Event
