= Aimi Eguchi =

- Corporate promotion character
- Aimi Eguchi as she appears in the Ezaki Glico commercial
- First appearance: June 2011
- Created by: Ezaki Glico
- Portrayed by: Yukari Sasaki (in concerts)
- Voiced by: Yukari Sasaki

In-universe information
- Gender: Female
- Occupation: Singer
- Nationality: Japanese
- Birth date: February 11, 1995 (age 30)

Aimi Eguchi (江口 愛実, Eguchi Aimi) is a fictional Japanese singer. As a collaboration between the Japanese girl group AKB48 and confectionery company Ezaki Glico, she was created and featured in June 2011 as a promotional model for Glico's Ice no Mi ice cream product. Eguchi is a CGI composite of various features of seven members from AKB48.

== History ==
Eguchi was announced as the group's newest member in June 2011. According to an official profile she was 16 years old, born on February 11, 1995, and from Saitama, north of Tokyo. She was featured in the Japanese magazine Weekly Playboy, and appeared in a television commercial for the confectionery company, Ezaki Glico. Suspicions arose amongst AKB48 fans and on June 19, 2011, Glico finally admitted that Eguchi was a fake created by the company, disappointing many fans. As of May 2013, she is no longer listed on the official website as a trainee. Yukari Sasaki, the member who voiced (and in concerts, portrayed) Eguchi, also eventually departed from the group in early 2024.

== CGI contributors ==
- Atsuko Maeda (eyes)
- Tomomi Itano (nose)
- Mariko Shinoda (mouth)
- Yuko Oshima (hair/body)
- Minami Takahashi (outline)
- Mayu Watanabe (eyebrows)
