= Masao Mukai =

Japanese choir conductor

Masao Mukai (向井 正雄, Mukai Masao) is a Japanese choir conductor.

He was born and raised in the city of Matsusaka, Mie Prefecture, Japan, and graduated from the School of Education at Mie University.

In 1992, he founded the Tsu Ensemble Chorus, officially known as "Vocal Ensemble 《EST》", which he still conducts. He also conducts the Yachimata Choir and, on occasion, the Ritsumeikan University Choir.

He specializes in church choir music from European Renaissance and has received numerous awards for his work both in Europe and his native Japan. In 2007 he was included in the book "Who's Who in Choral Music".

When not conducting, Masao Mukai teaches high school Math. In recent years he taught at Ujiyamada High School in the city of Ise, Mie Prefecture where, as conductor of the chorus club, he led the school to numerous appearances in the final chorus competition at the national level and won first place twice. He now teaches at Matsusaka Technical High School. He also occasionally gives lectures and acts as a judge at choral competitions.

== Awards ==
- The Conductor's Prize for the best interpretation of a contemporary work at the 7th International Chamber Choir Competition Marktoberdorf, Germany (2001)
- Gold Medal (ten times) at the Takarazuka International Chamber Chorus Contest
- Gold Medal (four times) at the All Japan Choral Competition.
