= Chung Su-bin =

South Korean actress (born 1998)

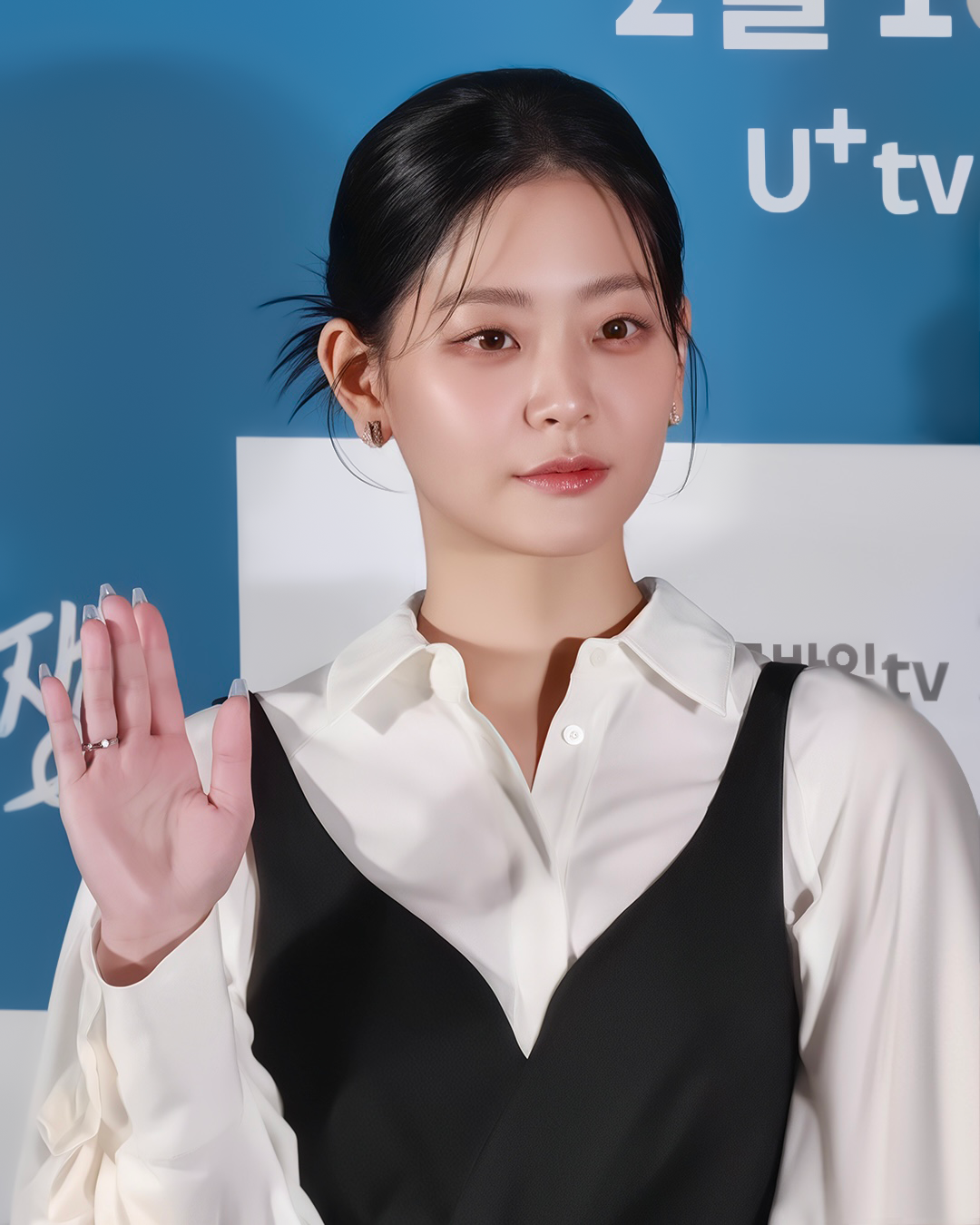
- Chung in 2025
- Born: August 17, 1998 (age 28); Seoul, South Korea
- Education: Korea National University of Arts
- Occupation: Actress
- Years active: 2020–present
- Agent(s): J,Wide-Company

Korean name
- Hangul: 정수빈
- RR: Jeong Subin
- MR: Chŏng Subin

Chung Su-bin (Korean: 정수빈; born August 17, 1998) is a South Korean actress. She is notable for her appearances in Revenge of Others (2022), Trolley (2022–2023), and Friendly Rivalry (2025).

== Career ==
Chung Su-bin graduated from Korea National University of Arts and debuted in 2020 in Live On.

From 2022 to 2024, she appeared in several supporting roles in dramas, notably Rookie Cops, Juvenile Justice, Revenge of Others, and Chief Detective 1958 among them. Her first main role was Kim Soo-bin, a mysterious girl in 2022 SBS drama Trolley. She received significant attention and positive reviews for her acting, and won the Best New Actress award at the 2023 SBS Drama Awards.

Her first movie appearance was in 2021 South Korean film A Lonely Island in the Distant Sea. It was followed by 2023 South Korean film It's Okay!, which premiered at both the 28th Busan International Film Festival and 74th Berlin International Film Festival. It was released in theaters in South Korea on February 26, 2025.

In 2025, she was cast in a major role in Friendly Rivalry, alongside Lee Hye-ri, Kang Hye-won, and Oh Woo-ri. She gained significant attention and positive reviews for her portrayal as transfer student Woo Seul-gi.

== Filmography ==
=== Film ===
Year	Title	Role	Ref.
2021	A Lonely Island in the Distant Sea	Yeon-hee	
2023	It's Okay!	Na-ri	

=== Television series ===
Year	Title	Role	Ref.
2020	Live On	Lee Sun-joo	
2021	Dark Hole	A female student	
2022	Juvenile Justice	Baek Mi-joo	
2022	Rookie Cops	Baek Sun-yu	
2022	Revenge of Others	Tae So-yeon	
2022–2023	Trolley	Kim Soo-bin	
2022–2023	Island	Lee Su-ryun	
2024	Chief Detective 1958	Bong Nan-sil	
2025	Friendly Rivalry	Woo Seul-gi	

== Awards and nominations ==
Name of the award ceremony, year presented, category, nominee of the award, and the result of the nomination
Award ceremony	Year	Category	Nominee / Work	Result	Ref.
APAN Star Awards	2025	Best Couple Award	Chung Su-bin (with Lee Hye-ri); Friendly Rivalry	Won	
APAN Star Awards	2025	Asia Star Award	Chung Su-bin	Won	
Blue Dragon Series Awards	2025	Best New Actress	Friendly Rivalry	Nominated	
Global OTT Awards	2025	Best New Actress	Friendly Rivalry	Won	
Korea Drama Awards	2025	Best New Actress	Friendly Rivalry	Won	
Korea Drama Awards	2025	Hot Star – Female	Friendly Rivalry	Won	
Korea Drama Awards	2025	Best Couple	Chung Su-bin (with Lee Hye-ri); Friendly Rivalry	Won	
SBS Drama Awards	2023	Best New Actress	Trolley	Won	
