= 2025 International Streaming Festival =

2025 Global OTT Awards

- Global OTT Awards
- Official poster
- Awarded for: The achievements of excellent content made for TV, OTT, and online across Asia
- Date: Opening: August 22, 2025; Global OTT Awards: August 24, 2025; Closing: August 25, 2025
- Venue: BIFF Theater, Busan Cinema Center, Busan
- Country: South Korea
- Presented by: Ministry of Science and ICT; Busan Metropolitan City; Korea International Streaming Festival; National IT Industry Promotion Agency
- Hosted by: Joo Jong-hyuk; Lee Hye-sung

Highlights
- Most wins: When Life Gives You Tangerines (3)
- Most nominations: When Life Gives You Tangerines (6)
- Best Creative: When Life Gives You Tangerines
- Best OTT Original: Nine Puzzles
- People's Choice Award (Male): Bai Jingting
- People's Choice Award (Female): Bai Lu
- Website: www.kisf.kr/kor/

Television/radio coverage
- Network: YouTube; U+ Mobile TV

The 2025 International Streaming Festival (Korean: 2025 국제스트리밍페스티벌), presented by Ministry of Science and ICT and Busan Metropolitan City, took place from August 22 to August 25, 2025, at BIFF Theater, Busan Cinema Center, Busan, South Korea.

The main event of the International Streaming Festival the Global OTT Awards is an enhanced and restructured version of Asia Contents Awards & Global OTT Awards, previously held in conjunction with the 2023 and 2024 Busan International Film Festival. It debuted as an official event of the 2025 International Streaming Festival and waw jointly hosted by the Korea International Streaming Festival and the Information and Communication Industry Promotion Agency. It was held on August 24, 2025 at Film Archive Outdoor Theater at 19:00 (KST).

The awards ceremony hosted by actor Joo Jong-hyuk and announcer Lee Hye-sung was held on August 24, 2025. Best Creative award was won by When Life Gives You Tangerines.

== Awards and nominations ==
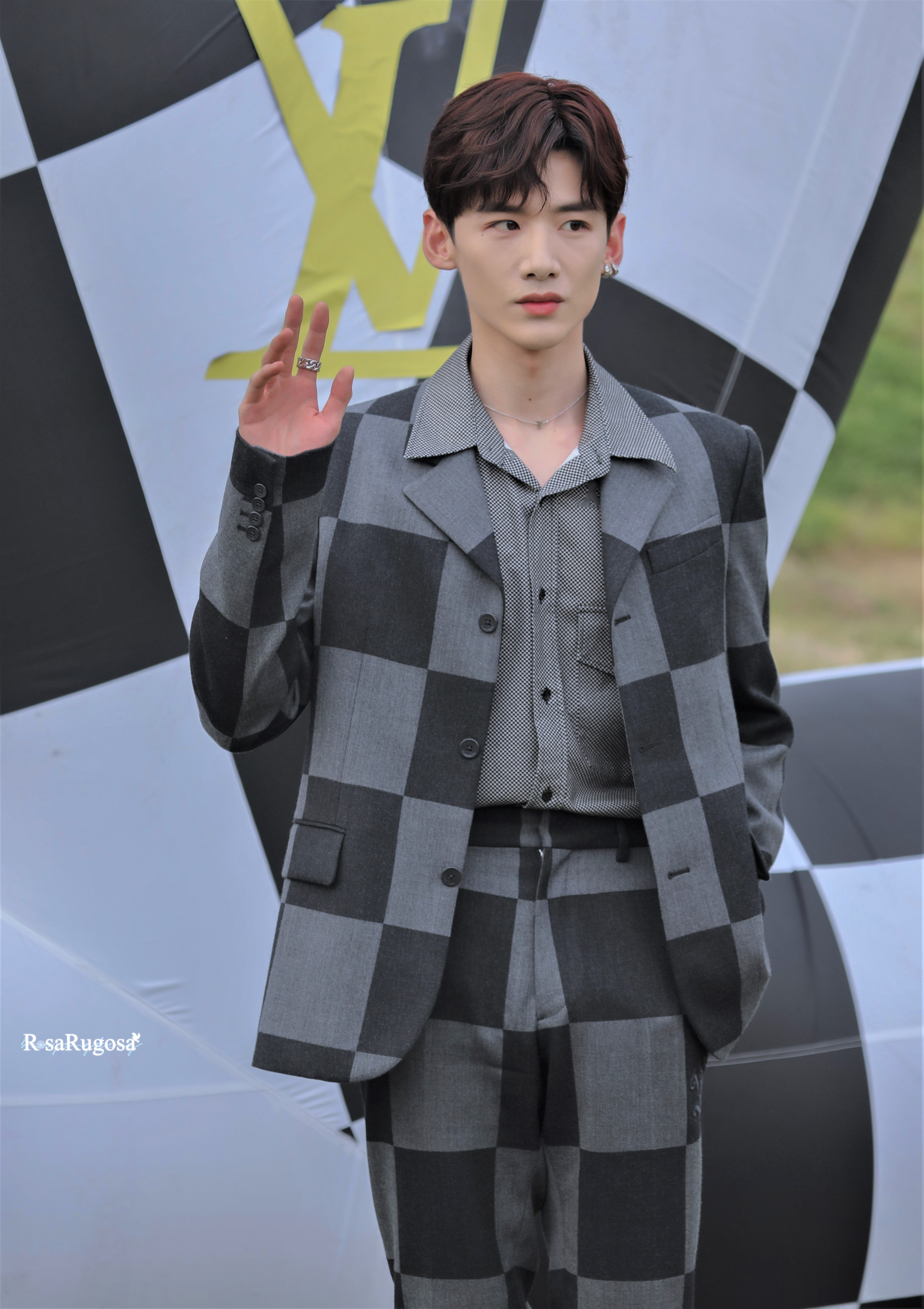
Bai Jingting winner of the People's Choice Award (Male)

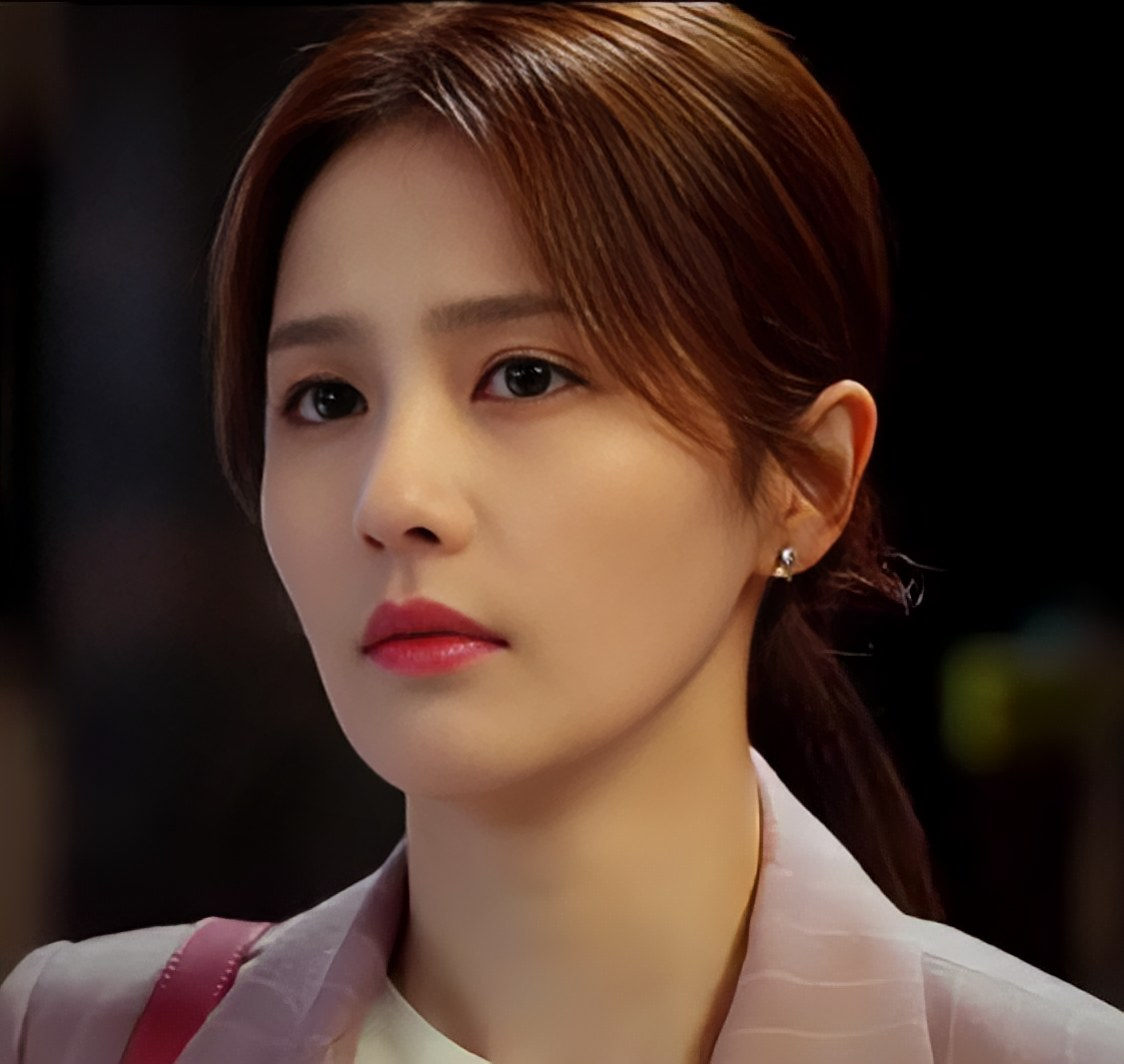
Bai Lu winner of the People's Choice Award (Female)

Nominees and winners (winners will be denoted in bold):

Awards were announced on August 24, 2025.

=== Open competition ===
Best Creative	Best OTT Original
(South Korea) **When Life Gives You Tangerines – Netflix**; (India) Black Warrant – Netflix; (Thailand) Mad Unicorn – Netflix; (China) Northward (TV series) – iQIYI; (South Korea) Our Unwritten Seoul – tvN	(South Korea) **Nine Puzzles – Disney+**; (Taiwan) Born for the Spotlight – Netflix; (South Korea) Family Matters – Coupang Play; (China) The First Frost – Youku; (South Korea) Study Group – TVING; (Malaysia) Yesterday's You – Viu
Best Asian TV Series	Best Reality & Variety
(Taiwan) **The Outlaw Doctor – PTS**; (South Korea) 4°C – TV+; (Philippines) Saving Grace – Prime Video; (Japan) Timeless Love Letters for My Classmates – Yomiuri Telecasting; (Hong Kong) What If – Viu	(South Korea) **World of Street Woman Fighter – CJ ENM**; (South Korea) Kian's Bizarre B&B – Netflix; (Singapore) Old Taste Detective 5 – meWATCH; (South Korea) SNL Korea Season 7 – Coupang Play
Best Director	Best Writer
(China) **Yao Xiaofeng – Northward – iQIYI**; (South Korea) Shim Na-yeon – Good Boy – JTBC; (Thailand) Nottapon Boonprakob – Mad Unicorn – Netflix; (Ukraine) Volodymyr Yanoschuk – The Train – Channel DIM; (South Korea) Kim Won-seok – When Life Gives You Tangerines – Netflix	(South Korea) **Lim Sang-choon – When Life Gives You Tangerines – Netflix**; (Japan) Tokuo Koji & Ichinoe Yoshino – Light of My Lion – TBS Television; (South Korea) Kang Pool – Light Shop – Disney+; (Taiwan) Chang Shi-hsien & Wen Yu-fang – The Outlaw Doctor – PTS; (South Korea) Lee Kang – Our Unwritten Seoul – tvN; (Hong Kong) Ho Ching-yi – What If – Viu
Best Lead Actor	Best Lead Actress
(Japan) **Kentaro Sakaguchi – What Comes After Love – Coupang Play**; (Kazakhstan) Berik Aichanov – 4°C – TV+; (China) Bai Jingting – The First Frost – Youku; (South Korea) Park Bo-gum – Good Boy – JTBC; (Thailand) Nattarut Noparattayaporn – Mad Unicorn – Netflix; (South Korea) Joo Ji-hoon – The Trauma Code: Heroes on Call – Netflix	(South Korea) **Park Eun-bin – Hyper Knife – Disney+**; (China) Bai Lu – Northward – iQIYI; (South Korea) Park Bo-young – Our Unwritten Seoul – tvN; (South Korea) IU – When Life Gives You Tangerines – Netflix; (Japan) Hirose Suzu – Who Saw the Peacock Dance in the Jungle? – TBS Television
Best Supporting Actor	Best Supporting Actress
(South Korea) **Oh Jung-se – Good Boy – SLL**; (China) Wang Qianyuan – Drifting Away – iQIYI; (Hong Kong) Francis Ng – Escape From the Trilateral Slopes – Youku; (Japan) Ryota Bando – Light of My Lion – TBS Television; (South Korea) Choi Dae-hoon – When Life Gives You Tangerines – Netflix	(South Korea) **Yeom Hye-ran – When Life Gives You Tangerines – Netflix**; (Taiwan) Chung Hsin-ling – Born for the Spotlight – Third Man Entertainment, Netflix; (China) Wen Qi – I Am Nobody: The Showdown Between Yin & Yang – Youku; (Japan) Ono Machiko – Light of My Lion – TBS Television; (South Korea) Jang Young-nam – Our Unwritten Seoul – Studio Dragon, tvN, TVING
Best Newcomer Actor	Best Newcomer Actress
(South Korea) **Kang You-seok – Resident Playbook – tvN, TVING**; (India) Zahan Kapoor – Black Warrant – Applause Entertainment, Netflix; (Thailand) Hirunkit Changkham & Wongravee Nateetorn – High School Frenemy – GMMTV; (China) Shi Pengyuan – A Life For A Life – iQIYI; (South Korea) Choo Young-woo – The Trauma Code: Heroes on Call – Netflix	(South Korea) **Chung Su-bin – Friendly Rivalry – STUDIO X+U (LG U+)**; (Taiwan) **Suri Lin – Born for the Spotlight – Third Man Entertainment, Netflix**; (China) Xu Ruohan – The Best Thing – iQIYI; (South Korea) Lee Su-hyun – Family Matters – Coupang Play
Best Visual Effects	Best Original Song
(China) **I Am Nobody: The Showdown Between Yin & Yang – Youku**; (South Korea) Heavenly Ever After – SLL; (South Korea) Light Shop – Disney+; (China) What a Wonderful World – iQIYI	(Japan) **ADO – Who Saw the Peacock Dance in the Jungle? – TBS Television**; (South Korea) 'Heavenly Ever After' – Lim Young-woong – Heavenly Ever After – SLL; (China) 'The First Frost' – Mayday – Nan Hong – Youku; (South Korea) 'Sunset' – 10cm – Our Unwritten Seoul – Studio Dragon, tvN, TVING; (South Korea) 'That Day' – Tomorrow X Together – Resident Playbook – eggiscoming, tvN, TVING

=== Invitation ===
Rising Star of the Year
(China) **Shi Pengyuan – A Life For A Life – iQIYI**; (South Korea) **Lee Su-hyun – Family Matters – Coupang Play**
Creative Beyond Border	New Technology
(South Korea) **Life Line – Independent**	(South Korea) **BINGE Korea**
People's Choice Award
Male	Female
**Bai Jingting** for The First Frost	**Bai Lu** for Northward
