= Revenge of Others =

2022 South Korean television series

- Promotional poster
- Hangul: 3인칭 복수
- Lit.: Third Person Revenge
- RR: 3inching boksu
- MR: 3inch'ing poksu
- Genre: Teen drama; Thriller
- Written by: Lee Hee-myung
- Directed by: Kim Yoo-jin
- Starring: Shin Ye-eun; Lomon
- Music by: Ha Geun-young
- Country of origin: South Korea
- Original language: Korean
- No. of episodes: 12

Production
- Executive producers: Park Young-soo (SBS); Cho Seung-hoon (CP)
- Producers: Han Jeong-hwan; Yoon-seon
- Running time: 59–62 minutes
- Production company: Studio S

Original release
- Network: Disney+
- Release: November 9 – December 14, 2022

Revenge of Others (Korean: 3인칭 복수; RR: 3inching boksu) is a South Korean television series starring Shin Ye-eun and Lomon. It premiered on Disney+ on November 9, 2022.

== Synopsis ==
Shooting champion Ok Chan-mi does not believe that her twin brother committed suicide. Just as the police begin to wrap up the case, Chan-mi transfers to her brother's school to find his killer. She meets and gets involved with Ji Soo-heon, a boy with many adversities in his life who also seeks justice, but in a rather dangerous way. Together, they work towards a common goal; getting revenge on perpetrators, despite knowing the risk.

== Cast ==
=== Main ===
- Shin Ye-eun as Ok Chan-mi, the twin sister of Ok Chan-kyu who transferred to Yong-Tan High School to find his murderer, because she does not believe that he committed suicide.
- Lomon as Ji Soo-heon, a suffering student in Class 3 of Yong-Tan High School who needs money. He helps bullied students take revenge on their bullies by beating up the bullies and thus gets paid for it.

=== Supporting ===
==== Yongtan High School Students ====
- Seo Ji-hoon as Seok Jae-beom, a student of Class 4 in Yong-Tan High School, who is the son of a wealthy family. He recently woke up from a six-month coma, making him resit the year as a senior, and has lost all of his memories.
- Chae Sang-woo as Gi Oh-sung, the manipulative class president of Class 4 in Yong-Tan High School, who was Jae-beom's friend before Jae-beom lost all his memories and tries to help Jae-beom get his memories back. He is the primary antagonist of the series.
- Lee Soo-min as Kuk Ji-hyun, Gi Oh-sung's stepsister
- Chung Su-bin as Tae So-yeon, an albino girl.
- Yeon Oh as Im Seung-woo
- Wooyeon as Hong Ah-jeong, Park Won-seok's girlfriend.
- Kang Yeol as Ok Chan-kyu/Park Won-seok, Ok Chan-mi's twin brother who died.
- Jin Ho-eun as Sa Jung-gyeong, a bully who sexually assaulted Seon-ha when they were previously in the same photography club.
- Hwang Bo-un as Seo Da-yeon
- Ahn Hyun-ho as Min Seon-ha, a victim of bullying who was previously in the same photography club as Jung-kyung, where he sexually assaulted her.
- Moon Ye-jin as Park Na-rin, Kuk Ji-Hyeon's friend who often gets involved is school events and hates Gi-Ohsung.

==== Police ====
- Kim Joo-ryoung as Jin So-jeong, a detective who was in charge of investigating Park Won-seok's death.
- Jang Hyun-sung as Gi Wang-do, Chief of Yongtan Police Station and Gi Oh-sung's father.
- Shin Su-ho as Hyun Jong-kook

==== Other ====
- Kim Do-yeon as Ahn Ji-won.
- Seo Hye-rin as Yang Hye-jeong, Kuk Ji-hyeon's mother.
- Kang Yi-seok as Kwon Se-jin
- Yoon Jin-sung as Shin Yu-kyung, Ji Soo-heon's mother.

== Production ==
On September 7, 2022, the cast was announced to include Shin Ye-eun and Lomon who had already been confirmed as the lead roles.
