= A Lonely Island in the Distant Sea =

- Directed by: Kim Mi-young
- Written by: Kim Mi-young
- Produced by: Lee Se-jin
- Starring: Park Jong-hwan; Lee Yeon; Kang Kyung-hun; Park Hyun-suk; Chung Su-bin; Jang Jun-whee; Kang Gil-woo
- Cinematography: Lee Jin-geun
- Edited by: Kim Mi-young
- Music by: Cho Kwang-ho
- Production companies: Bori and Odi Film
- Distributed by: Eye M MOVement
- Release date: September 27, 2023 (South Korea)
- Country: South Korea
- Language: Korean
- Box office: $13,126

A Lonely Island in the Distant Sea (Korean: 절해고도; RR: Jeolhaegodo) is a 2021 South Korean drama film written and directed by Kim Mi-young. The film won the 2021 DGK MEGABOX Award at the Busan International Film Festival.

== Premise ==
A divorced sculptor decides to become a monk.

== Reception ==
Marie Claire Korea found the film explored the various forms of loneliness in our societies.
