= Living (2023 TV series) =

2023 Taiwanese television series

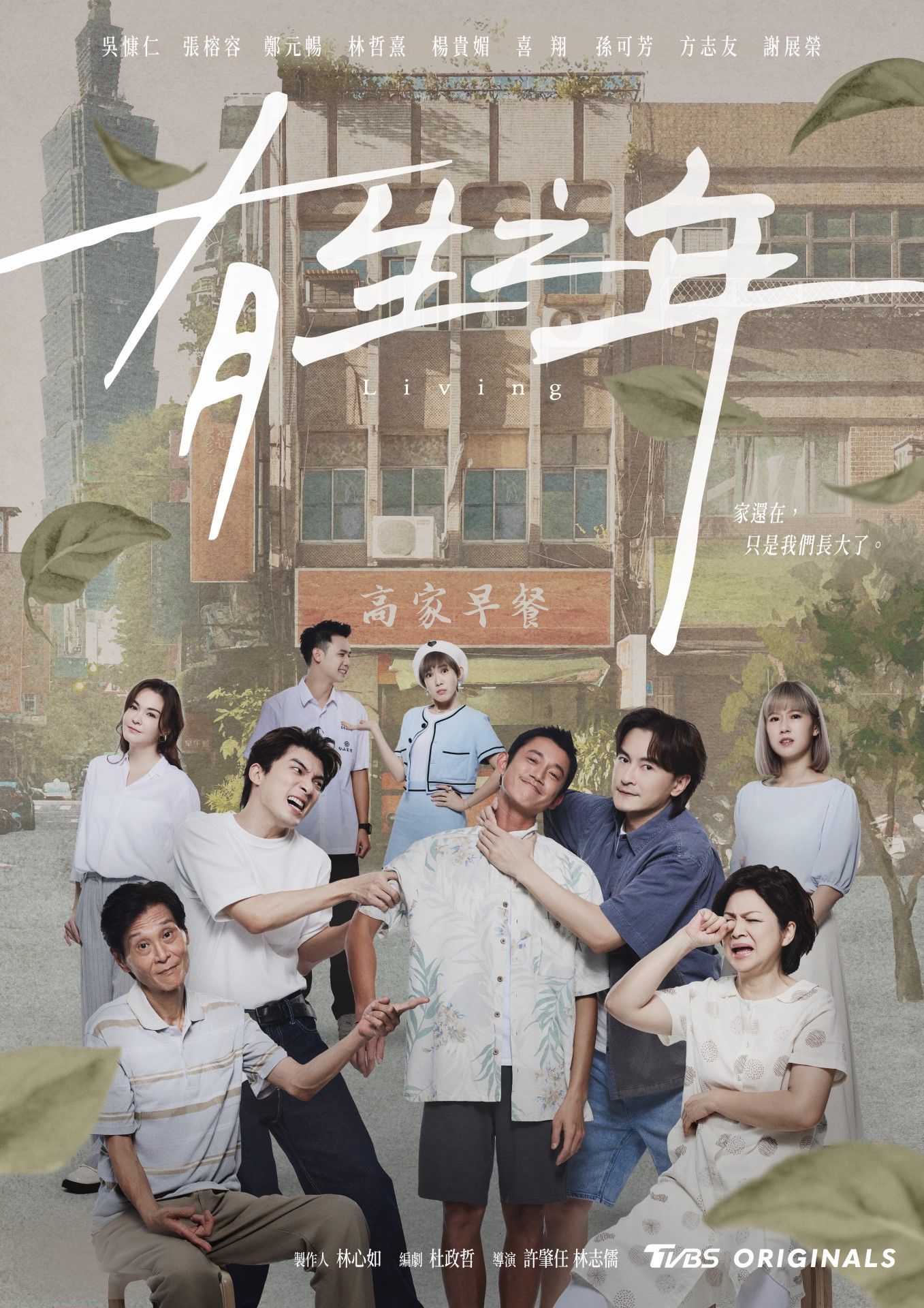
- 有生之年
- Screenplay by: Tu Cheng-che
- Directed by: Hsu Chao-jen; Lin Chih-ju
- Starring: Wu Kangren; Sandrine Pinna; Joe Cheng; JC Lin; Yang Kuei-Mei; Jason King
- Country of origin: Taiwan
- Original language: Taiwanese

Production
- Producer: Ruby Lin
- Production company: TVBS

Original release
- Network: GTV; CTS
- Release: 17 September – 22 October 2023

Living (Chinese: 有生之年) is a 2023 TVBS Taiwanese television series written by Tu Cheng-che, and directed by Hsu Chao-jen and Lin Chih-ju. Starring Wu Kangren, Sandrine Pinna, Joe Cheng, JC Lin, Yang Kuei-Mei, and Jason King. The series premiered on GTV Drama Channel and CTS Main Channel on September 17, 2023. It was simultaneously released on streaming platforms such as Netflix Taiwan, Hami Video+, IQIYI International (excluding China, Hong Kong, and Macau), Astro QJ (Malaysia and Brunei), and Viu (Hong Kong and Macau), followed by a release on TVBS Channel 42 on September 23, 2023.

== Plot ==
The series follows the Gao family, starting with Gao Jiayue, who is facing challenges in both his love life and career. He initially intends to return home to visit his family before bidding farewell to the world. However, he discovers that everyone is not living well than he expected.

== Cast ==
- Wu Kangren as Gao Jiayue
- Sandrine Pinna as Hsu Ya-hsin
- Joe Cheng as Gao Jiayang
- JC Lin as Gao Jiakai
- Yang Kuei-mei as Chen Liying
- Jason King as Gao Zhenglong
- Sun Ke-fang as Hong Shishi
- Beatrice Fang as Zhuang Xiuling
- Xie Zhanrong as Gao Chengyou
- Suri Lin as Ye Ning

== Accolades ==
Awards and nominations
Year	Award	Category	Nominee(s) / work(s)	Result	Ref.
2024	59th Golden Bell Awards	Best Television Series	Living	Won	
2024	59th Golden Bell Awards	Best Director in Television Series	Hsu Chao-jen and Lin Chih-ju	Won	
2024	59th Golden Bell Awards	Best Leading Actress in a Television Series	Yang Kuei-mei	Won	
2024	59th Golden Bell Awards	Best Leading Actor in a Television Series	Wu Kangren	Won	
2024	59th Golden Bell Awards	Best Supporting Actor in a Television Series	Joe Cheng	Won	
2024	59th Golden Bell Awards	Best Supporting Actress in a Television Series	Beatrice Fang	Nominated	
2024	59th Golden Bell Awards	Most Promising Newcomer in a Television Series	Xie Zhanrong	Won	
2024	59th Golden Bell Awards	Best Editing	Lin Zixian	Nominated	
2024	59th Golden Bell Awards	Best Costume Design	Ye Zhuzhen	Nominated	
2024	6th Asia Contents Awards & Global OTT Awards	Best Lead Actor	Wu Kangren	Nominated	
