= 4th Blue Dragon Series Awards =

2025 South Korean television awards ceremony

- Official poster
- Awarded for: Excellence in OTT television
- Date: July 18, 2025
- Site: Paradise City, Incheon
- Hosted by: Jun Hyun-moo; Lim Yoona
- Organised by: Sports Chosun
- Most wins: When Life Gives You Tangerines (3); The Trauma Code: Heroes on Call (3)
- Most nominations: When Life Gives You Tangerines (6)
- Website: bsa.blueaward.co.kr/series/

Television/radio coverage
- Network: KBS2

The 4th edition of the Blue Dragon Series Awards ceremony, organised by Sports Chosun was held on July 18, 2025, at Paradise City, Incheon, at 20:30 KST. It was hosted by Jun Hyun-moo and Lim Yoona and broadcast live through KBS2, CHZZK, TVING and Prizm.

The nominees were announced on June 27, 2025. The series which were produced and invested in by over-the-top (OTT) media platforms, and released from June 1, 2024, to May 31, 2025, were eligible for nominations.

== Winners and nominees ==
Winners are listed first and emphasized in bold.

**Blue Dragon's Choice (Grand Prize)**
**When Life Gives You Tangerines**
**Best Drama**	**Best Entertainment Program**
**The Trauma Code: Heroes on Call**; Family Matters; Way Back Love; Karma; When Life Gives You Tangerines	**Culinary Class Wars**; Kian’s Bizarre B&B; The Devil’s Plan: Death Room; My Name is Gabriel; Game of Blood 3
**Best Actor**	**Best Actress**
**Ju Ji-hoon – The Trauma Code: Heroes on Call**; Park Bo-gum – When Life Gives You Tangerines; Park Hae-soo – Karma; Lee Byung-hun – Squid Game 2; Lee Joon-hyuk – Dongjae, the Good or the Bastard	**IU – When Life Gives You Tangerines**; Park Eun-bin – Hyper Knife; Seo Hyun-jin – The Trunk; Lee Hye-ri – Friendly Rivalry; Cha Joo-young – The Queen Who Crowns
**Best Supporting Actor**	**Best Supporting Actress**
**Lee Kwang-soo – Karma**; Park Byung-eun – Hyper Knife; Yoon Kyung-ho – The Trauma Code: Heroes on Call; Lee Jun-young – Weak Hero Class 2; Choi Dae-hoon – When Life Gives You Tangerines	**Yeom Hye-ran – When Life Gives You Tangerines**; Gong Seung-yeon – Karma; Kim Gook-hee – Family Matters; Claudia Kim – Gyeongseong Creature 2; Jung Eun-chae – Your Honor
**Best New Actor**	**Best New Actress**
**Choo Young-woo – The Trauma Code: Heroes on Call**; Kang You-seok – When Life Gives You Tangerines; Lomon – Family Matters; Bae Hyun-sung – Gyeongseong Creature 2; Heo Nam-jun – Your Honor	**Kim Min-ha – Way Back Love**; Lee Su-hyun – Family Matters; Lee Yi-dam – The Queen Who Crowns; Chung Su-bin – Friendly Rivalry; Ha Young – The Trauma Code: Heroes on Call
**Best Male Entertainer**	**Best Female Entertainer**
**Kian84 – Kian’s Bizarre B&B**; Kim Won-hoon – SNL Korea 6 / SNL Korea 7; Shin Dong-yup – SNL Korea 6 / SNL Korea 7; Jang Dong-min – Bloody Game 3; Choo Sung-hoon – Try? Choo-ry!	**Lee Soo-ji – SNL Korea 6 / SNL Korea 7**; Gabi – My Name is Gabriel; Uhm Ji-yoon – Becoming a Baseball Nerd; Hyeri – Agents of Mystery; Ji Ye-eun – Kian’s Bizarre B&B
**Best New Male Entertainer**	**Best New Female Entertainer**
**Moon Sang-hoon – The Blank Menu For You**; Yoon Nam-no – Culinary Class Wars; Lee Jin-hyuk – SNL Korea 6 / SNL Korea 7; Jung Geun-woo – Kim Seong Geun’s Winter Vacation; Jung Hyun-gyu – The Devil’s Plan: Death Room	**Mimi – Kian is CEO**; Seo Hye-won – SNL Korea 6; Yoon So-hee – The Devil’s Plan: Death Room; Risabae – The Influencer; Tsuki – Zombieverse: New Blood
**LG Uplus Positive Influence Award**	**TIRTIR Popular Star Awards**
**Ji Ye-eun**	**Park Bo-gum**; **IU**; **Lee Hye-ri**; **Lee Joon-hyuk**
**OST Popularity Award**
**Yeonjun – "Boyfriend" (Cinderella at 2 AM)**

=== Television programs with multiple wins ===
The following television programs received multiple wins:

Wins	Television programs
3	When Life Gives You Tangerines
3	The Trauma Code: Heroes on Call

=== Television programs with multiple nominations ===
The following television programs received multiple nominations:

Nominations	Television programs
6	When Life Gives You Tangerines
5	Karma
5	The Trauma Code: Heroes on Call
5	SNL Korea Season 6
4	Family Matters
2	Friendly Rivalry
2	Way Back Love
2	Gyeongseong Creature 2
2	Hyper Knife
2	Your Honor
2	The Queen Who Crowns
2	Kian’s Bizarre B&B
2	The Devil’s Plan: Death Room

== Presenters and performers ==
The following individuals, listed in order of appearance, presented awards or performed musical numbers.

=== Presenters ===
Presenter(s)	Award(s)	Ref.
Kwak Joon-bin and Yoon Ga-i	Best New Male Entertainer and Best New Female Entertainer	
Lee Jung-ha and Go Youn-jung	Best New Actor and Best New Actress	
Ahn Jae-hong and Geum Hae-na	Best Supporting Actor and Best Supporting Actress	
Shin Dong-yup and Jang Do-yeon	Best Male Entertainer and Best Female Entertainer	
Im Si-wan and Park Bo-young	Best Actor and Best Actress	
Uhm Tae-goo and Park Ji-hyun	Best Entertainment Program	
Jang Ki-yong and Ahn Eun-jin	Best Drama	
Jeon Do-yeon	Blue Dragon's Choice (Grand Prize)	

=== Performers ===
Name(s)	Performed	Ref.
Jatsby		
KiiiKiii	Intro + "I Do Me"	
Im Si-wan		
