= Kim Min-ha =

South Korean actress (born 1995)

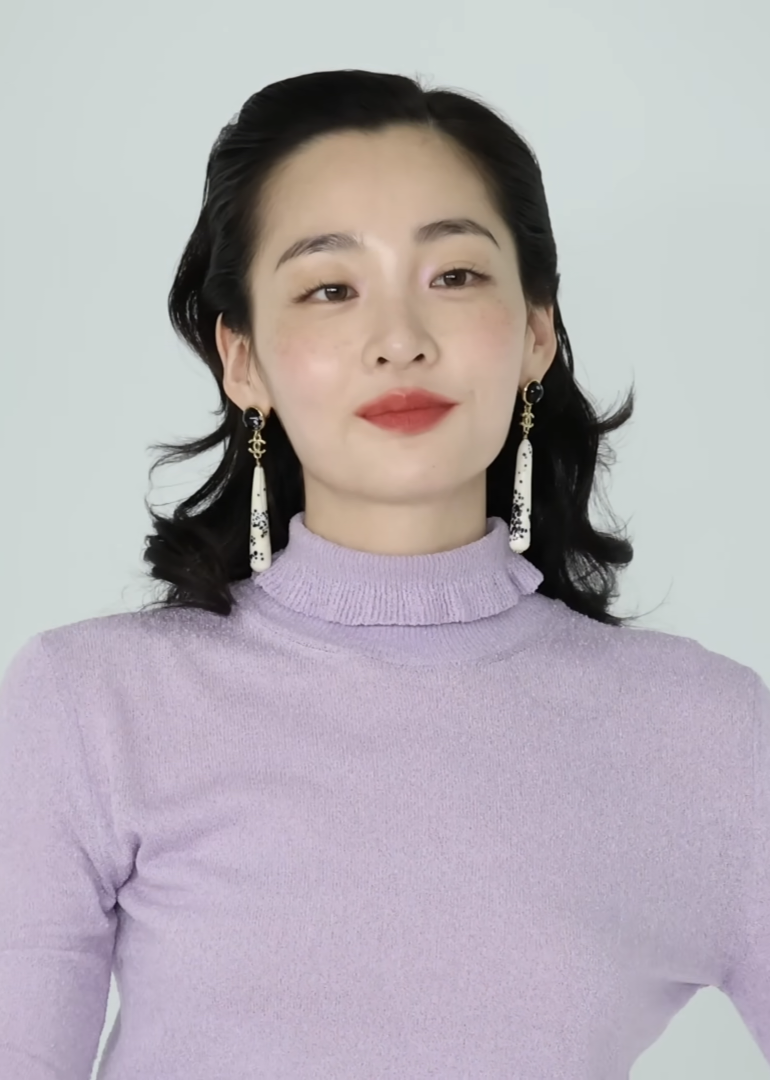
- Kim in May 2026
- Born: September 1, 1995 (age 31); Seoul, South Korea
- Education: Hanyang University
- Occupation: Actor
- Years active: 2016–present
- Agent: Noon Company

Korean name
- Hangul: 김민하
- RR: Gim Minha
- MR: Kim Minha

Kim Min-ha (Korean: 김민하; born September 1, 1995) is a South Korean actress. She debuted in 2016 through the web drama "Two Women's Season 2" and gained international recognition for her role as the young adult Sunja in Apple TV+ series Pachinko in 2022.

== Career ==
Kim Min-ha studied theatrical and film studies at Hanyang University. She made her debut in 2016, in the web drama Two Women Season Two, followed by School 2017, Gun Law Men and Women, and It's Okay to be Insignificant.

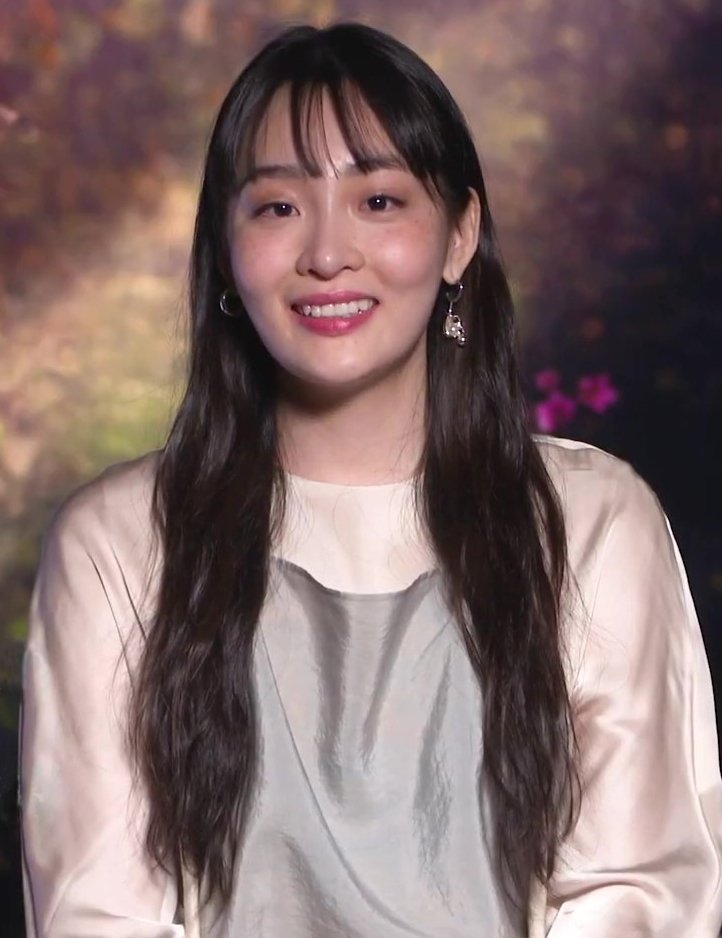
Kim in 2022

In 2022, Kim won the "Beyond Cinema Award" at the 8th Marie Claire Asia Star Awards hosted by Busan International Film Festival. This new award is given to an actor who has performed in a topical work that has been released through various platforms. Kim's performance in Apple TV+ Pachinko, increased her global popularity which contributed to her winning the first award.

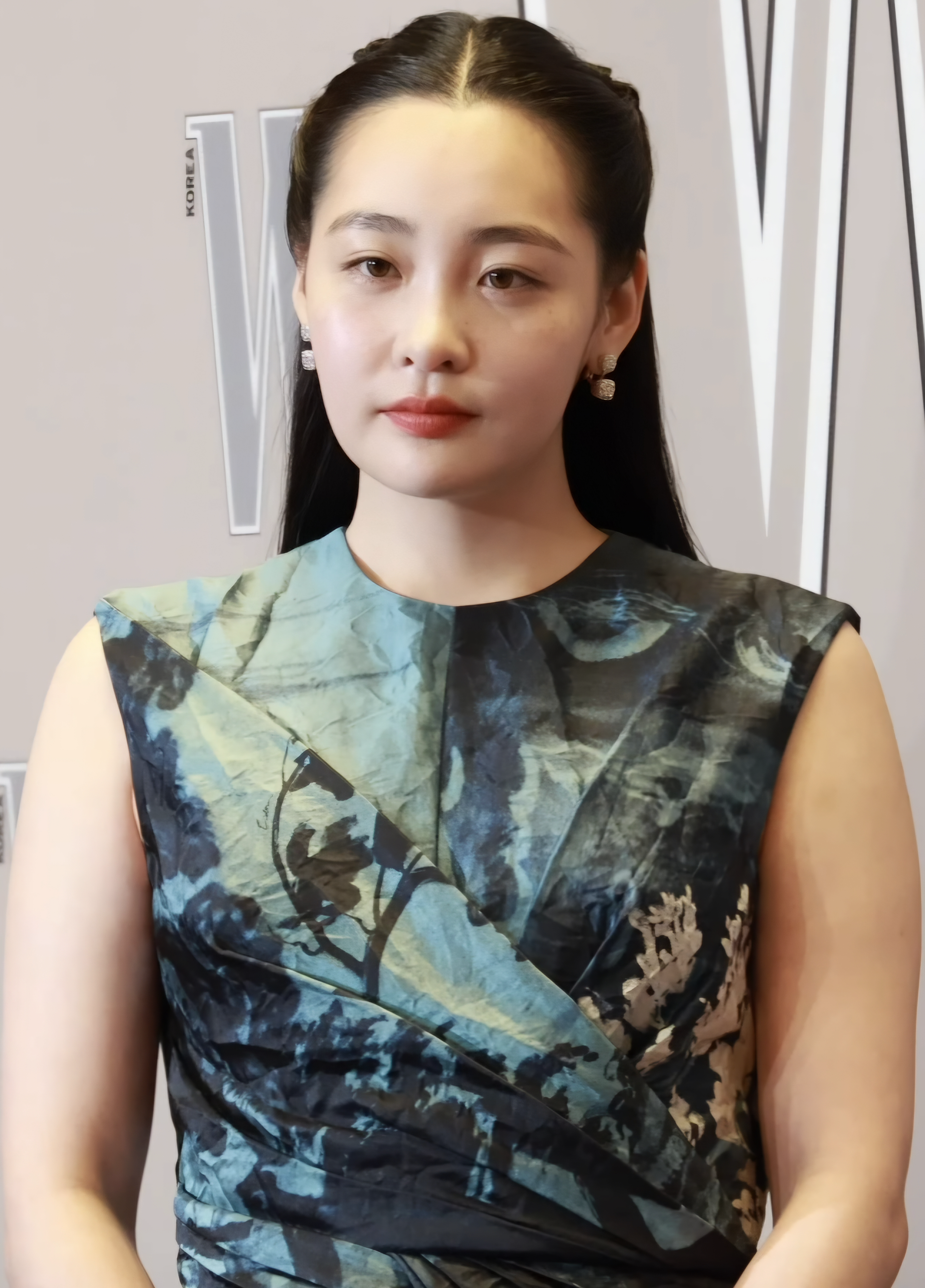
Kim in 2024

In 2026, she was selected as the host of the opening ceremony of 31st Busan International Film Festival to be held from October 6 to 15.

== Filmography ==
=== Film ===
Key
†	Denotes films that have not yet been released

Year	Title	Role	Notes	Ref.
2018	After Spring	Hyeon-jeong	Short film	
2020	Main Street	Ga-young	Short film	
2020	Killer Swell: Our Space	Eugene	Short film	
2020	The Call	young Seon-hee	Netflix film	
2020	Homecoming	Hyejeong		
2025	Hana Korea	Hye-sun		
2026	Made in Korea	Shenbagam (voice)	Korean dub	
2026	The Table: Day and Night		Opening film of BIFF	
TBA	A Girl with Closed Eyes †	In-seon		
TBA	Messily Ever After †	Su-hyun		

=== Television series ===
Year	Title	Role	Notes	Ref.
2017	School 2017	Yeo Seung-eun		
2018	Partners for Justice	Park Mi-young		
2022–2024	Pachinko	Teenage and young adult Sunja	Season 1–2	
2024	Light Shop	Seon-hae		
2025	Way Back Love	Jeong Hee-wan		
2025	Typhoon Family	Oh Mi-seon		
2026	Dead-End Job	Ji-yoon		

=== Web series ===
Year	Title	Role	Notes	Ref.
2016	Two Girls 2	Girl 2		

=== Television shows ===
Year	Title	Role	Ref.
2022	Off the Grid	Main Cast	

=== Music video appearances ===
Year	Song title	Artist	Ref.
2023	"Expectation"	Doh Kyung-soo	
2024	"Come Back to Me"	RM	

== Discography ==
=== Singles ===
Title	Year	Album
"Fallin" (with Doyoung)	2022	Non-album single

== Ambassadorship ==
- Ambassador for the 2022 Cultural Heritage Visiting Campaign

== Accolades ==
=== Awards and nominations ===
Name of the award ceremony, year presented, category, nominee of the award, and the result of the nomination
Award ceremony	Year	Category	Nominee / Work	Result	Ref.
Asian Academy Creative Awards	2025	Best Actress in a Leading Role (Korea)	Pachinko Season 2	Won	
Asia Contents Awards	2022	Rising Star Award	Pachinko	Won	
Blue Dragon Series Awards	2025	Best New Actress	Way Back Love	Won	
ContentAsia Awards	2026	Best Female Lead in a TV Programme/Series Made in Asia	Way Back Love	Nominated	
Gotham Awards	2022	Outstanding Performance in a New Series	Pachinko	Nominated	
Kinolights Awards	2022	Actress of the Year (Domestic)	Pachinko	5th	
Korea First Brand Awards	2026	Actress – Rising Star	Kim Min-ha	Won	
Marie Claire Asia Star Awards	2022	Beyond Cinema Award	Pachinko	Won	
Marie Claire Asia Star Awards	2024	Face of Asia Award	Kim Min-ha	Won	
Marie Claire Asia Star Awards	2026	Marie Claire Award	Kim Min-ha	Won	
Marie Claire Film Festival	2024	Radiance Award	Kim Min-ha	Won	
Seoul International Drama Awards	2025	Best Actress	Pachinko Season 2	Won	
Seoul Webfest Film Festival	2022	Best Actress (Shorts)	Main Street	Nominated	

=== Listicles ===
Name of publisher, year listed, name of listicle, and placement
Publisher	Year	Listicle	Placement	Ref.
Forbes	2022	Korea Power Celebrity Rising Star	Placed	
Gold House	2022	A100 List (with Pachinko Creators & Stars)	Placed	
