= Lomon =

Uzbek and South Korean actor (born 1999)

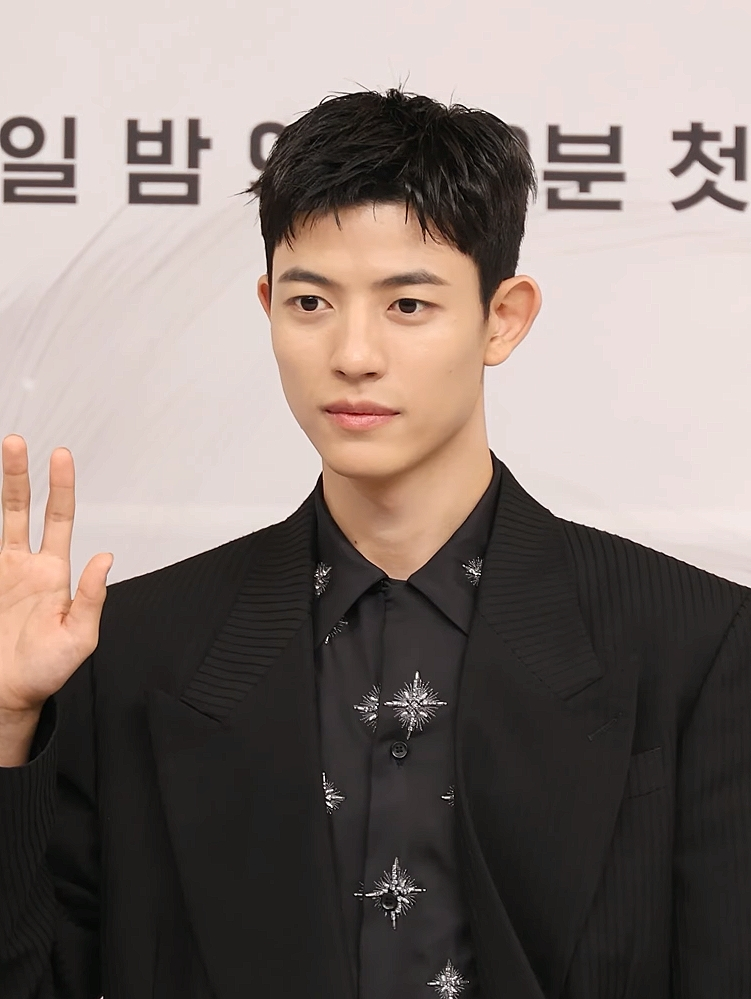
- Lomon in January 2026
- Born: Park Solomon; November 11, 1999 (age 26); Tashkent, Uzbekistan
- Education: Apgujeong High School
- Occupations: Actor; model
- Years active: 2014–present
- Agent: Big Smile Entertainment

Korean name
- Hangul: 박솔로몬
- RR: Bak Solromon
- MR: Pak Sollomon

Park Solomon (Korean: 박솔로몬; born November 11, 1999), also known by his stage name Lomon (로몬), is an Uzbek and South Korean actor. Having debuted in 2014, he is best known for his leading roles in Sweet Revenge (2017), All of Us Are Dead (2022), and Revenge of Others (2022).

== Name ==
In an interview, he explained the meaning of his name:

"My father named me. I am not religious. At the time, my father was reading the Bible and gave me this name with the hope that I would live wisely. I am working hard to live up to my name. I will try to live wisely."

== Early life and education ==
Lomon was born on November 11, 1999, in Tashkent, to a Korean father and a mother of Koryo-saram descent. As a child, he and his family lived in Russia and later moved to South Korea. Finishing his elementary in South Korea, Park graduated from Apgujeong High School in Seoul's Gangnam District.

He said he originally wanted to be a singer but changed to acting after deciding that his voice was not good enough. He is also into b-boying.

== Career ==
=== 2014–2019: Career beginnings ===
Lomon made his debut in 2014 with two drama series, Bride of the Century and 4 Legendary Witches. After appearing in several other roles in the following years, he gained initial heightened attention with his lead role in Sweet Revenge in 2017.

In 2019, Lomon starred in the Chinese drama Lookism, having learned Mandarin for the role.

=== 2022–present: Rising popularity ===
He made his return to the small screen after two years when he starred as Lee Su-hyeok in the Netflix zombie-themed series All of Us Are Dead in 2022. Following the international success of the series, Lomon gained a huge following of 2 million followers on Instagram in less than a week. In the same year, Lomon was cast as the lead male character in the Disney+ series Revenge of Others opposite of Shin Ye-eun.

On January 19, 2022, Lomon signed an exclusive contract with Big Smile Entertainment. In 2023, Lomon was cast as the main character for 2024 U+ Mobile TV web series Branding in Seongsu, where he plays the role of So Eun-ho.

In 2024, Lomon was announced as the male lead alongside Kim Hye-yoon in the upcoming SBS TV fantasy drama No Tail to Tell. This drama marks his return to television since 2017, having focused on web series during his rise to fame.

== Filmography ==
=== Film ===
| Year | Title | Role | Ref. |
|---|---|---|---|
| 2015 | The Empty Home | Yoon Chan | |
| 2015 | Earth to the Galaxy | Ji-gu | |
| 2016 | Horror Stories 3 | PZ3000 | |

=== Television series ===
| Year | Title | Role | Ref. |
|---|---|---|---|
| 2014 | Bride of the Century | Choi Kang-joo (young) | |
| 2014 | 4 Legendary Witches | Ma Do-hyun (young) | |
| 2015 | The Doctors | Hong Ji-hong (teen) | |
| 2016 | Shopping King Louie | | |
| 2017 | The Guardians | Yoon Si-wan | |
| 2026 | No Tail to Tell | Kang Si-yeol | |

=== Web series ===
| Year | Title | Role | Notes | Ref. |
|---|---|---|---|---|
| 2017 | Sweet Revenge | Shin Ji-hoon | | |
| 2019 | Lookism | "Handsome" Tuo Wen Shuai/Kris | Chinese-language series | |
| 2022–present | All of Us Are Dead | Lee Su-hyeok | Season 1–present | |
| 2022 | Revenge of Others | Ji Soo-heon | | |
| 2024 | Branding in Seongsu | So Eun-ho | | |
| 2024 | Family Matters | Baek Ji-hoon | | |

== Awards and nominations ==
Name of the award ceremony, year presented, category, nominee of the award, and the result of the nomination
| Award ceremony | Year | Category | Nominee / Work | Result | Ref. |
|---|---|---|---|---|---|
| Asian Television Awards | 2025 | Best Actor in a Supporting Role | Family Matters | Nominated | |
| Blue Dragon Series Awards | 2025 | Best New Actor | Family Matters | Nominated | |
| Director's Cut Awards | 2023 | Best New Actor in Television | All of Us Are Dead | Nominated | |
| MBC Drama Awards | 2017 | Best Young Actor | The Guardians | Nominated | |
