= Branding in Seongsu =

2024 South Korean television series

- Promotional poster
- Hangul: 브랜딩 인 성수동
- Hanja: 브랜딩 인 聖水洞
- Lit.: Branding in Seongsu-dong
- RR: Beuraending in Seongsu-dong
- MR: Pŭraending in Sŏngsu-dong
- Genre: Romantic thriller
- Created by: Choi Sun-mi
- Written by: Choi Sun-mi; Jeon Sun-young
- Directed by: Jung Heon-soo
- Starring: Kim Ji-eun; Lomon; Yang Hye-ji; Kim Ho-young
- Music by: Jung Seung-hyun
- Country of origin: South Korea
- Original language: Korean
- No. of episodes: 24

Production
- Executive producers: Ahn Ji-hoon (CP; Choi Seung-eop; Kang Bo-yoon
- Producers: Lee Deok-jae; Lee Kyung-sun; Lee Won-seok; Choi Sun-mi; Shin Jung-soo; Jung Hee-seok; Hong Seung-chul
- Cinematography: Seok Min; Lee Jae-young
- Editors: Baek Eun-ja; Lim Shin-mi
- Running time: 30 minutes
- Production companies: Studio X+U; Studio Vplus Co. Ltd.; Higround

Original release
- Network: U+ Mobile TV
- Release: February 5 – March 14, 2024

Branding in Seongsu (Korean: 브랜딩 인 성수동) is a 2024 South Korean romantic thriller mid-form series created by Choi Sun-mi, co-written by Choi and Jeon Sun-young, directed by Jun Heon-soo, and starring Kim Ji-eun, Lomon, Yang Hye-ji, and Kim Ho-young. It was released on U+ Mobile TV from February 5, to March 14, 2024. It is also available for streaming on Lemino in Japan, and Viki and Viu in selected regions.

== Synopsis ==
It is a relationship-reversal romantic thriller set in the branding mecca of Seongsu-dong that follows the soul-swapping story of Kang Na-eon, a tough marketing team leader, and So Eun-ho, a flirtatious intern.

== Cast and characters ==
=== Main ===
- Kim Ji-eun as Kang Na-eon

The youngest marketing team leader who succeeds in every project she touches.

- Lomon as So Eun-ho

A veteran intern who is responsible for the cuteness of a marketing agency with his sad look and youthful appearance.

- Yang Hye-ji as Do Yu-mi

A cute and bubbly marketer but sometimes an idiot.

- Kim Ho-young as Cha Jeong-wu

The art director of Seongsu Agency and Na-eon's best friend of eight years.

=== Supporting ===
- Ahn Yeon-hong as Min Hee-jung

CEO of Seongsu Agency and Na-eon's mentor.

- Park Gi-deok as Han Yi-jae

An executive of Segye Group, the parent company of Seongsu Agency.

- Kim Byul as Nam Byeol

Seongsu Agency's marketing team 2 leader and keeps Na-eon in check.

- Jung Yi-rang as Ri Yeong-ae

A veteran marketer who has been with the agency since its foundation but became part of the underdog team after being hit by young marketers.

- Jeon Joon-ho as Joo Rex

A very popular guy with his world-warming appearance and style, and has a good personality, but in fact has a big twist.

- Chae Soo-ah as Park Jenny

An influencer who epitomizes the MZ generation and a member of the Seongsu Agency who entered the underdog team as a high school graduate.

- Yeon Ji-hyun as Seo Wool-soop

An intern at Seongsu Agency.

- Kim Young-jae as Seong Su-dong

An intern at Seongsu Agency. He is a talented person with a cool appearance and personality, who listens and sympathizes with Eun-ho.

- Ahn Jin-ah as Namgung Da-eun

Eun-ho's first love.

- Park Young-woon as Nam Yun-hyeok

A top star celebrity.

- Lee Kwang-hee as Hwang Jae-ha

A charming third generation chaebol who is cheeky but impossible to hate.

=== Special appearance ===
- Shin Hyun-soo as Kim Jin-seok

CEO of beauty brand XU who has a cool-headed personality that puts people's abilities unlike his gentle smile. (episode 1–4)

== Production ==
Produced and planned by LG Uplus' content production division Studio X+U with Studio Vplus and Higround as co-producers, created by Choi Sun-mi, directed by Jung Heon-soo, who worked on Twelve Nights (2018), and co-written by Choi and Jeon Sun-young.

Kim Ji-eun and Lomon were confirmed as the main cast of the series. Later, Yang Hye-ji and Kim Ho-young were added to the main list.

The OST singing lineup of Branding in Seongsu — consists of Bang Ye-dam, Yoo Sung-eun, MRCH, Yoo Yeon-jung (WJSN), The Bain (Choi Bo-hoon), and Bora (Cherry Bullet) — was released through OST production company Vlending Co., Ltd. and Studio X+U social media accounts includes various styles of vocals and fresh and trendy artists, drawing expectations from music and drama fans even before the series air.

== Release ==
Studio X+U confirmed the release date which would be on February 5, 2024, and each episode was released every Monday to Thursday okn U+ Mobile TV. In addition, it is available to stream on OTT platforms such as Viki in 190 countries, Lemino in Japan, and Viu in 16 countries.

== Original soundtrack ==
=== Part 1 ===
Released on February 8, 2024
No.	Title	Lyrics	Music	Artist	Length
1.	"On My Hill"	Kim Ho-kyung	Jung Seung-hyun; Park Tae-hyun	U Sung-eun	3:16
2.	"On My Hill" (Inst.)		Jung Seung-hyun; Park Tae-hyun		3:16
Total length:					6:32

=== Part 2 ===
Released on February 15, 2024
No.	Title	Lyrics	Music	Artist	Length
1.	"Lemon"	Kim Ho-kyung	Jung Seung-hyun; Park Tae-hyun	Yoo Yeon-jung (WJSN)	3:52
2.	"Lemon" (Inst.)		Jung Seung-hyun; Park Tae-hyun		3:52
Total length:					7:44

=== Part 3 ===
February 22, 2024
No.	Title	Lyrics	Music	Artist	Length
1.	"My All" (나의 낮과 밤이 너라서)	Kim Ho-kyung	Jung Seung-hyun; Park Tae-hyun	Bang Ye-dam	3:14
2.	"My All" (나의 낮과 밤이 너라서; Inst.)		Jung Seung-hyun; Park Tae-hyun		3:14
Total length:					6:28

=== Part 4 ===
February 29, 2024
No.	Title	Lyrics	Music	Artist	Length
1.	"Breaking Rocks"	Kim Ho-kyung	Jung Seung-hyun; Park Tae-hyun	The Vane	2:54
2.	"Breaking Rocks" (Inst.)		Jung Seung-hyun; Park Tae-hyun		2:54
Total length:					5:48

=== Part 5 ===
March 7, 2024
No.	Title	Lyrics	Music	Artist	Length
1.	"Star" (함께 띄운 별)	Kim Ho-kyung	Jung Seung-hyun; Park Tae-hyun	Bora (Cherry Bullet)	3:27
2.	"Star" (함께 띄운 별; Inst.)		Jung Seung-hyun; Park Tae-hyun		3:27
Total length:					6:54

=== Part 6 ===
March 14, 2024
No.	Title	Lyrics	Music	Artist	Length
1.	"Only for You" (너로부터야)	Kim Ho-kyung	Jung Seung-hyun; Park Tae-hyun	MRCH	3:38
2.	"Only for You" (너로부터야; Inst.)		Jung Seung-hyun; Park Tae-hyun		3:38
Total length:					7:16
