= It's Okay! =

2023 film by Kim Hye-young

- Theatrical release poster
- Hangul: 괜찮아 괜찮아 괜찮아!
- Lit.: It's okay, it's okay, it's okay!
- RR: Gwaenchana gwaenchana gwaenchana!
- MR: Kwaench'ana kwaench'ana kwaench'ana!
- Directed by: Kim Hye-young
- Written by: Cho Hong-jun; Kim Hye-young
- Produced by: Song Won-seok
- Starring: Lee Re; Jin Seo-yeon; Chung Su-bin; Lee Jung-ha; Son Suk-ku
- Cinematography: Lee Seok-min
- Edited by: Lee Gang-hee
- Music by: Kim Jun-seok
- Production company: Twomen Film
- Release dates: October 6, 2023 (BIFF); February 26, 2025 (South Korea)
- Running time: 102 minutes
- Country: South Korea
- Language: Korean
- Box office: US$691,275

It's Okay! (Korean: 괜찮아 괜찮아 괜찮아!) is a 2023 South Korean coming-of-age drama film co-written and directed by Kim Hye-young in her directorial debut. The film starring Lee Re, Jin Seo-yeon, and Chung Su-bin, follows In-yeong (Lee Re), a high school student who loses her mother and hides in her art group school basement, but is discovered by the strict art director Seol-ah (Jin Seo-yeon), and they unexpectedly end up living together.

It was selected in the Generation Kplus section at the 74th Berlin International Film Festival, where it had its International premiere on 18 February, and won Children's Jury Generation Kplus: Crystal Bear for Best Feature Film.

== Plot ==
The ever-optimistic girl In-yeong, who is happiest when on stage, ends up living under the same roof as Seol-ah, a lonely perfectionist and the strict director of an arts troupe. Then there is Na-ri, the star and perpetual top performer of the troupe, who considers In-yeong her one-sided rival. Do-yoon, In-yeong's one and only male friend, confesses his feelings daily, blurring the line between love and friendship. And Dong-wook, a quirky pharmacist and In-yeong's neighborhood friend, offers both words of advice and medicine prescriptions.

== Cast ==
- Lee Re as In-yeong
- Jin Seo-yeon as Seol-ah
- Chung Su-bin as Na-ri
- Lee Jung-ha as Do-yoon
- Son Suk-ku as Dong-wook

== Release ==
It's Okay! had its premiere at 28th Busan International Film Festival in Korean Cinema Today - Panorama section on October 6, 2023. It had its International premiere on February 18, 2024, as part of the 74th Berlin International Film Festival, in Generation Kplus, where it won Children's Jury Generation Kplus: Crystal Bear for Best Feature Film.

The film was showcasesd in Family section of the 71st Sydney Film Festival on June 17, 2024.

It was released in theaters in South Korea on February 26, 2025.

== Reception ==
The film was released on February 26, 2025 on 588 screens. The film opened with 17,126 cumulative audience on the first day of its release.

As of March 19, 2025, the film has grossed US$691,275 from 164,320 admissions at the South Korean box office.

== Accolades ==
Award	Date of ceremony	Category	Recipient(s)	Result	Ref.
Berlin International Film Festival	25 February 2024	Children's Jury Generation Kplus: Crystal Bear for Best Feature Film	Kim Hye-young	Won	
Blue Dragon Film Awards	November 19, 2025	Best New Director	Kim Hye-young	Won	
