= Family Matters (South Korean TV series) =

2024 South Korean television series

- Promotional poster
- Hangul: 가족계획
- Lit.: Family Plan
- RR: Gajokgyehoek
- MR: Kajokkyehoek
- Genre: Thriller
- Created by: Kim Jung-min
- Written by: Kim Jung-min
- Directed by: Kim Gok (Season 1); Kim Sun (Season 1); Kim Jung-min (Season 2)
- Starring: Bae Doona; Ryoo Seung-bum; Baek Yoon-sik; Lomon; Lee Soo-hyun
- Country of origin: South Korea
- Original language: Korean
- No. of episodes: 6

Production
- Running time: 50 minutes
- Production companies: KeyEast; Ordinary Gem; Monster Union; Borderless Film

Original release
- Network: Coupang Play
- Release: November 29 – December 27, 2024

Family Matters (Korean: 가족계획) is a 2024 South Korean thriller drama starring Bae Doona, Ryoo Seung-bum, Baek Yoon-sik, Lomon, and Lee Soo-hyun. The series depicts about a woman who received harsh training in an unknown facility as a child, escapes the facility, and lives as an ordinary family member, but encounters cruel villains and punishes them with even more cruel and strange abilities. It was released on Coupang Play from November 29 to December 27, 2024, every Friday at 20:00 (KST). On November 19, 2025, the production of the second season was confirmed, with the return of all the main cast, except Ryoo Seung-bum and with screenwriter Kim Jung-min replacing Kim Gok and Kim Sun as the new director.

== Plot ==
Family Matters revolves around people with extraordinary abilities who form a fake family to protect themselves from an evil criminal organization. The Baek family consists of a mother, father, grandfather, and two teenage siblings – each harboring secrets and special powers.

As the Baek family navigates the challenges of pretending to be a normal one, they find themselves entangled in dangerous situations involving heinous criminals. Despite their differences, the family begins to form real emotional bonds, discovering the meaning of family, trust, and love along the way.

== Cast ==
=== Main ===
- Bae Doona as Han Young-soo
- Ryoo Seung-bum as Baek Cheol-hee
- Baek Yoon-sik as Baek Kang-seong
- Lomon as Baek Ji-hoon
- Lee Soo-hyun as Baek Ji-woo, the seventeen-year-old daughter.

=== Supporting ===
==== Introduced in season 1 ====
- Kim Si-eun as Kwon Min-jeong
- Kim Gook-hee as Oh Gil-ja

==== Introduced in season 2 ====
- Park Byung-eun as Baek Cheol-yong

== Production ==
=== Development ===
Family Matters was created and written by Kim Jung-min, co directed by Kim Gok and Kim Sun, and produced by KeyEast, Ordinary Gem, Monster Union and Borderless Film.

=== Casting ===
On October 5, 2023, it was reported by Star News that Bae Doona had been cast and confirmed to appear in the series.

In the second season, Ryu Seung-bum, who played the father, Chul-hee, in the first season, left the series, and Park Byung-eun joined. Bae Doona, grandfather Baek Yeon-sik, son Lomon, and daughter Lee Soo-hyun continued to appear. Directors Kim Guk and Kim Sun, who directed the first season, also stepped down, and Kim Jung-min, the screenwriter of the first season, took over as the new director.

=== Filming ===
Principal photography began in late December 2023.

== Release ==
Family Matters was scheduled to premiere on Coupang Play on November 29, 2024, and would air every Friday at 20:00 (KST).

== Accolades ==
=== Awards and nominations ===
Award ceremony	Year	Category	Nominee	Result	Ref.
Asian Television Awards	2025	Best Original Drama Series (OTT)	Family Matters	Nominated	
Asian Television Awards	2025	Best Direction (Drama)	Kim Gok, Kim Sun	Won	
Asian Television Awards	2025	Best Original Screenplay	Kim Jeong-min	Nominated	
Asian Television Awards	2025	Best Actress in a Leading Role	Bae Doo-na	Nominated	
Asian Television Awards	2025	Best Actress in a Supporting Role	Lee Soo-hyun	Nominated	
Asian Television Awards	2025	Best Actor in a Supporting Role	Lomon	Nominated	
Baeksang Arts Awards	2025	Best Supporting Actress	Kim Gook-hee	Nominated	
Baeksang Arts Awards	2025	Best Screenplay	Kim Jung-min	Nominated	
Blue Dragon Series Awards	2025	Best Drama	Family Matters	Nominated	
Blue Dragon Series Awards	2025	Best Supporting Actress	Kim Gook-hee	Nominated	
Blue Dragon Series Awards	2025	Best New Actor	Lomon	Nominated	
Blue Dragon Series Awards	2025	Best New Actress	Lee Soo-hyun	Nominated	
ContentAsia Awards	2025	Best Male Lead in a TV Programme/Series Made in Asia	Ryu Seung-beom	Won; Silver Prize	
ContentAsia Awards	2025	Best Female Lead in a TV Programme/Series Made in Asia	Bae Doo-na	Won; Gold Prize	
Director's Cut Awards	2025	Best Director (Series)	Kim Gok, Kim Sun	Nominated	
Director's Cut Awards	2025	Best Actress (Series)	Bae Doona	Won	
Director's Cut Awards	2025	Best Actor (Series)	Ryoo Seung-bum	Nominated	
Director's Cut Awards	2025	Best New Actress (Series)	Lee Soo-hyun	Nominated	
Director's Cut Awards	2025	Best New Actor (Series)	Lomon	Nominated	
Global OTT Awards	2025	Best OTT Original	Family Matters	Nominated	
Global OTT Awards	2025	Best Newcomer Actress	Lee Soo-hyun	Nominated	
Global OTT Awards	2025	Rising Star of the Year	Lee Soo-hyun	Won	
