= What If (Hong Kong TV series) =

- 三命
- Screenplay by: Ho Ching Yi, Wong Po Yin, Ho Chung Kan, Milkyway Image
- Directed by: Vicky Wong, Jonathan Li, Jeff Cheung
- Starring: Ernesto de Sousa, Power Chan, Ashley Lam, Skye Chan, Chrissie Chau
- Country of origin: Hong Kong
- Original language: Cantonese
- No. of episodes: 12

Production
- Production location: Hong Kong
- Running time: Episode1: 120 minutes Episode 2 to 12: 60 minutes

Original release
- Network: ViuTV
- Release: 31 March – 13 April 2025

What If (Chinese: 三命; Jyutping: saam1 ming6) is a 2025 Hong Kong television drama produced by Milkyway Image and MakerVille. The series aired on ViuTV from March 31 to April 13, 2025, and spans 12 episodes. Directed by Vicky Wong, Jonathan Li, and Jeff Cheung, the drama explores themes of fate, choice, and the ripple effects of seemingly minor decisions across six decades of Hong Kong history.

The series is also available on Viu in selected regions, such as Singapore, Malaysia and Thailand.

== Synopsis ==
The story follows Lok Chak Shun, a premature baby born in 1960s Hong Kong, whose life diverges into three distinct paths after a pivotal moment in his youth. As a comic enthusiast, Shun creates and circulates his own comics in school, only to discover that someone has secretly altered their content. Alongside his classmate Kan, he sets a trap to expose the culprit, who turns out to be a charismatic girl about to leave school.

On the day Shun plans to apologize, he encounters a broken kite—an event that triggers a temporal ripple, leading him to three alternate life trajectories:

1. Comic Artist Path: Shun becomes a successful comic artist, marries his muse Carol Lam, and experiences personal and professional highs and lows, including the loss of his wife in a car accident and a return to art after retirement.
2. Civil Servant Path: Shun abandons his artistic dreams to pursue a stable career in public service, navigating bureaucratic challenges, family dynamics, and ethical dilemmas.
3. Triad Path: Shun is drawn into the criminal underworld, rising through the ranks of a triad organization, facing betrayal, violence, and eventual downfall.

Each path reflects different facets of Hong Kong society and history, including major events such as the 1987 stock market crash, the 1997 handover, the SARS outbreak, and urban redevelopment controversies.

== Cast ==
The role of Lok Chak Shun is portrayed by multiple actors across different life stages and timelines:

- Ernesto de Sousa – Lok Chak Shun (Adult)
- Power Chan – Lok Chak Shun (Middle-aged)
- Tomi Ng – Lok Chak Shun (Teenage)
- Ng Wing Sze, Ashley Lin, Chrissie Chau, Ben Yuen, Tony Wu, Emotion Cheung, Pancy Chan, and Yiyi Zhao play key supporting roles across the three timelines

== Release ==
"What If" premiered on ViuTV on March 31, 2025, airing weekdays at 21:30. The final two episodes were broadcast consecutively on April 13, 2025. A "full version" with extended scenes was later made available online. The series was also released on Bilibili for mainland Chinese audiences, albeit with some edited content.

== Awards and nominations ==
Award ceremony	Year	Category	Nominee / Work	Result	Ref.
Asian Content Awards & Global OTT Awards	2025	Best Asian TV Series	What If	Nominated	
Asian Content Awards & Global OTT Awards	2025	Best Screenplay	Ho Ching-yi	Nominated	
