= Suri Lin =

Taiwanese actress (born 2000)

- 林廷憶
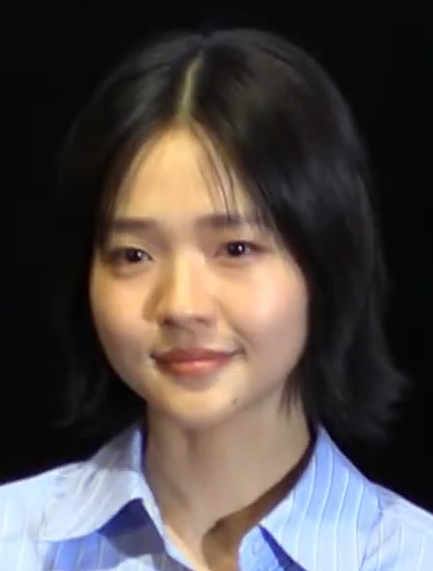
- Lin in May 2026
- Born: Lin Ting-yi; 19 November 2000 (age 25)
- Other name: Suri Lin
- Education: National Sun Yat-sen University
- Occupation: Actress
- Years active: 2020-present

Suri Lin Tin-yi (Chinese: 林廷憶, born 19 November 2000) is a Taiwanese actress. Her performance in Born for the Spotlight (2024) earned her Best Newcomer Actress at the 7th Global OTT Awards and received a nomination for Best Leading Actress in a Television Series at the 60th Golden Bell Awards.

== Biography ==
Lin was born on 19 November 2000 and studied at the Department of Foreign Languages and Literature, National Sun Yat-sen University.

In 2020, Lin began her acting career with the short film One Summer's Day . In 2023, she starred in PTS Student Drama Showcase A Moving Day and appeared in TVBS Living as Ye Ning.

In 2024, Lin gained recognition for her role as Shi Aima in Born for the Spotlight, for which she won the Best Newcomer Actress award at the 7th Global OTT Awards and received a nomination for Best Leading Actress in a Television Series at the 60th Golden Bell Awards.

In 2025, she starred in Netflix's The Resurrected as An Chi. That same year, Lin took on her first lead role in the Japanese television series Queen of Mars portraying Lili-E1102, a visually impaired girl.

== Filmography ==
=== Film ===
Year	Title	Role	Notes	Ref.
2020	One Summer's Day	Jiaqi	Short Film	
2021	Blossom		Short Film	
2022	Breathing Practice		Short Film	

=== Television Series ===
Year	Title	Role	Notes	Ref.
2023	A Moving Day		TV Film	
2023	Living	Ye Ning		
2024	Born for the Spotlight	Shi Aima		
2025	The Resurrected	An Chi		
2025	Queen of Mars	Lili-E1102	Lead Role	

=== Music video appearances ===
Year	Artist	Song title	Ref.
2024	I'mdifficult	Last Summer (月亮惹的禍)	
2024	MC	小心碰頭 Mind Your Ex	
2025	Accusefive	我天生 - 有夢版 True Colors - Dreamers	

== Awards and nominations ==
Year	Award	Category	Work	Result	Ref.
2021	15th Myfone Mobile Creation Award	Best Actress	Blossom	Won	
2025	7th Asia Contents Awards & Global OTT Awards	Best Newcomer Actress	Born for the Spotlight	Won	
2025	60th Golden Bell Awards	Best Leading Actress in a Television Series	Born for the Spotlight	Nominated	
