= OnlyOneOf =

South Korean boy group

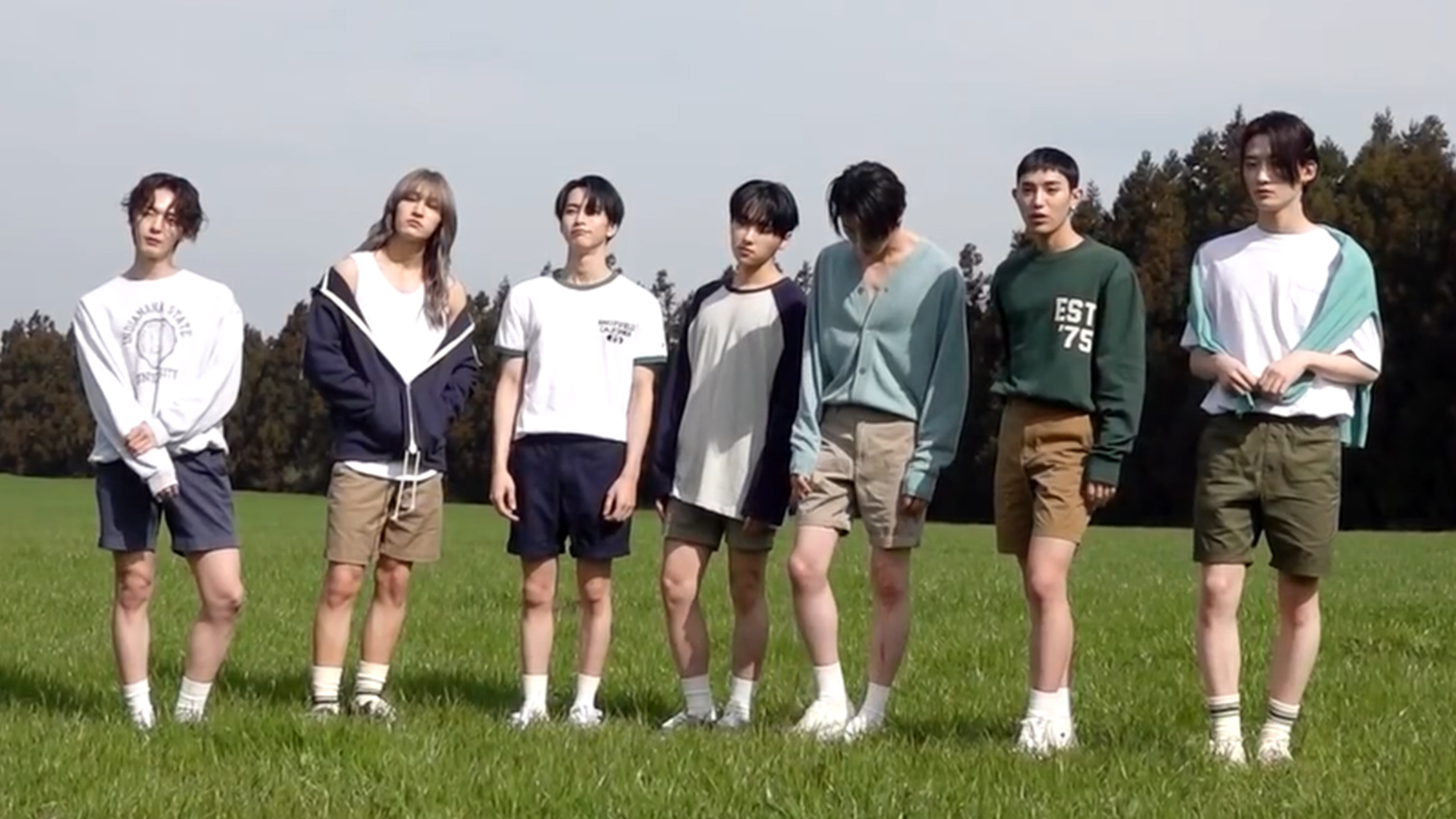
- OnlyOneOf on Produced by [Myself] photoshoot From left to right: KB, Junji, Nine, Rie, Love, Mill, and Yoojung.

Background information
- Origin: Seoul, South Korea
- Genre: K-pop
- Years active: 2019–present
- Labels: 8D; Teichiku
- Members: KB; Rie; Yoojung; Junji; Mill; Nine
- Past members: Love
- Website: onlyoneof-official.com

OnlyOneOf (Korean: 온리원오브) is a South Korean boy band formed by 8D Entertainment in 2019. They debuted on May 28, 2019, with Dot Point Jump. OnlyOneOf was originally a seven-member group; Love departed on August 2, 2021.

== History ==
=== 2019: Debut with Dot Point Jump and first comeback Line Sun Goodness ===
On May 1, 2019, 8D Creative announced the debut of a seven-member group called OnlyOneOf, which stands for "someone's only one". The style pursued by the group was described as "ubersexual," indicating a mix of softness and strong masculine sexiness. The members trained for three years, coming up with songs, stage composition, costumes and concepts themselves for the weekly evaluations.

The group debuted on May 28 with "Savanna" and "Time Leap" from their mini album Dot Point Jump; only the two songs were released on that day along with the music videos, while the other four tracks were revealed sequentially for each 5,555 use of the hashtag "#OnlyOneOf" on Twitter. Members KB, Love and Nine participated in writing and composing two songs. "Savanna" was considered a viral YouTube hit, gaining more than 10 million views in five months.

As part of the promotions of their first EP, the group performed on music shows for seven weeks, held a 4-hour fansigning event, and worked as baristas in Seoul, Busan and Gwangju. Starting October 1, they released the 8-part reality show OnlyOneOf Love Unlock through Mnet and M2.

They released their second mini album Line Sun Goodness the following October 30. Due to technical difficulties, the music video for the title track "Sage" was not released until three days later, on November 2. The song explores, both in the lyrics and through the visuals of the music video, temptation and redemption, and the mythology and characters behind OnlyOneOf's concept, which has been developed by creative director and producer Jaden Jeong over three years taking inspiration from religion and the Bible. KB, Love and Nine once again wrote lyrics, music, and arrangements for three out of six tracks.

Following the release of their second EP, OnlyOneOf toured Malaysia from November 22 to November 24.

=== 2020: Unknown Art Pop 2.1 and Produced by [ ] series ===
On January 30, OnlyOneOf released the single album Unknown Art Pop 2.1, featuring the songs "Dora Maar" and "Picasso," which talk about the relationship between Pablo Picasso and Dora Maar from two different perspectives. At the same time, they launched a contest for participants to write English lyrics for "Dora Maar", with the winner receiving a cash prize of $100,000, as well as having their version released as the official international version at a later date. Praising their "avant-guarde approach," Billboard named them one of the K-pop rookie groups to watch in 2020.

On April 30, it was announced that OnlyOneOf would launch the Produced by [ ] series, which would act as a parenthesis among the group's regular releases: the first one, Produced by [ ] Part 1, was produced by Gray, Boycold, and Cha Cha Malone. The three-track single album was released on May 21 along with the title track "Angel", an EDM and hip-hop song by Gray, who declared he had wanted to collaborate with OnlyOneOf for the traditional K-pop atmosphere and elegant vibe of their music.

The second single album, Produced by [ ] Part 2, featured three songs by GroovyRoom, Samuel Seo, and JR Groove: it was released on August 27 with the title track "A Song of Ice & Fire", which was based on the omonymous novel series by George R. R. Martin. Compared to the first installment of the series, Produced by [ ] Part 2 presented more melodic than hip-hop music.

=== 2021: Instinct Part. 1, Produced by [Myself], and Love's departure ===
On April 8, 2021, OnlyOneOf released their third mini album Instinct Part. 1 with the title track "Libido", a song about sexual instinct and impulses that saw KB and Nine participating in composition and arrangement. The group explained that it had always been debated whether the topic was art or obscenity, and that they wanted to break a taboo never dealt with by other groups. Overall, the whole album explores the theme of instinct, and deals with the sexy concept Jaden Jeong had in mind when OnlyOneOf was created.

The members touching each other's bodies and using strings in the choreography caused a controversy for being too suggestive as soon as they performed "Libido" on M Countdown on April 9, to which OnlyOneOf responded that it emphasized the theme of the music and that they hoped the public could focus on the overall aesthetic and expressive power. Instinct Part. 1 recorded the highest daily sales for the group since debut – 27,926 copies according to the Hanteo Chart and 25,872 copies for the Gaon Chart – and exceeded 50,000 as of April 14. On the same day, OnlyOneOf released the Guilty Pleasure version of the "Libido" music video. At the end of the year, "Libido" was chosen as the best Korean music video of 2021 by Rolling Stone India for breaking boundaries and representing the LGBTQ+ community.

In May, KB, Love and Rie sang "Into You" for the webseries The Sweet Blood. On July 15, OnlyOneOf released their third single album Produced by [Myself], whose songs were entirely self-written and self-composed by the members.

On August 2, Love withdrew from the group for personal reasons.

On September 10, the group unexpectedly released the single album Unknown Ballad 2.3, containing the song "Mono" written and composed by Nine. Another single album, WarmWinterWishes, was released on December 23.

=== 2022: Japanese debut, Instinct Part. 2 and Underground Idol ===
On January 12, 2022, OnlyOneOf made their Japanese debut with the compilation album OnlyOneOf Japan Best Album, which comprised the Japanese version of "Angel" and the hybrid Korean-Japanese versions of five previous released songs.

On January 14, the group released its fourth extended play Instinct Part. 2 with the title track "Skinz", which stresses the importance of individuality and being yourself. On May 2, they held the OnlyOneOf Japan Live 2022 at the Zepp DiverCity Tokyo, their first performance in Japan, in front of 3,000 people; it was followed by the release of the Japanese single album Suit Dance (Japanese ver.) on May 18, which ranked fifth on the Oricon Weekly Singles Chart.

In the second half of the year the members embarked in the Underground Idol project, which saw them release a solo song each every month, accompanied by an "art pop" remix of one of the group's songs. The first member was Yoojung, who released "Begin" and its music video on June 27. He was followed by KB with "Be Free" on July 27, and Junji with "Be Mine" on August 25. In the meantime, they performed at the 2022 G-Kpop Concert on July 15.

After a pause for the group's second Japanese single album Cunning Woman (ズルい女) – a remake of the 1995 song by Sharam Q – and a three-stop tour in Japan at the beginning of October for the OnlyOneOf 2nd Japan Live 2022, the Underground Idol project continued: on October 27, Rie released "Because", followed by Mill on November 28 with "Beat". On November 11, it was announced that OnlyOneOf had all been cast in the gay webseries Bump Up Business.

On January 4, 2023, the Underground Idol project ended with Nine's release, the single "Beyond". Overall, the project was appreciated for showcasing OnlyOneOf's abilities in singing, composition, arrangement, and acting.

=== 2023–2025: Seoul Collection, Things I Can't Say Love, world tour and contract expiration ===
On March 2, 2023, OnlyOneOf released their first Korean extended play as a group after one year, Seoul Collection. The album tells the stories of young people hurt by others wandering in Seoul; Nine and KB participated in writing, composing and arranging the seven songs.

The group embarked on the OnlyOneOf Grand America Tour on March 29. Of the 16 stops, seven sold out as soon as ticketing opened at the beginning of January 2023. The tour ended on April 30, followed by OnlyOneOf's first Korean concerts on May 27 and 28.

On December 14, 2023, they announced their comeback with their sixth mini album, Things I Can't Say Love, released on January 10, 2024. On March 9–10 they performed at Sungshin University in Seoul, kicking off the OnlyOneOf 2024 dOpamine World Tour. The tour continued in Latin America, North America, Southeast Asia, Oceania and Europe until the summer.

On February 5, 2025, the group released the digital single "Stay." They held eleven shows in Osaka from March 8 to March 16 to celebrate White Day, then embarked in a North America tour in March and April. They performed once again in Tokyo for eight shows from May 14 to May 17, with the exception of Rie, who was serving in the military at the time.

On October 30, 2025, 8D Entertainment announced that the group's contract had expired and it would no longer manage them.

== Members ==
- KB (규빈)
- Rie (리에)
- Yoojung (유정)
- Junji (준지)
- Mill (밀)
- Nine (나인)
- Love (러브) (2019–2021)

== Discography ==
=== Compilation albums ===
Title	Details
OnlyOneOf Japan Best Album	Released: January 12, 2022 (JPN); Label: Techiku Entertainment; Formats: CD, digital download, streaming; Track listing: 1. "Angel (prod. Gray) (Japanese ver.)" 2. "Blossom (JP+KR Hybrid ver.)" 3. "Sage (JP+KR Hybrid ver.)" 4. "Dora Maar (JP+KR Hybrid ver.)" 5. "Boss (JP+KR Hybrid ver.)" 6. "Savanna (JP+KR Hybrid ver.)"

=== Extended plays ===
Title	Details	Peak chart positions		Sales
Title	Details	KOR	JPN	Sales
Dot Point Jump	Dot Point Jump Vol.1; Released: May 28, 2019; Label: RSVP, 8D Creative, Kakao M; Formats: CD, digital download, streaming; Track listing: 1. "Time Leap"; 2. "Savanna"; 3. "Blossom"	27	—	KOR: 5,077
Dot Point Jump	Dot Point Jump Vol.2; Released: June 4, 2019; Label: RSVP, 8D Creative, Kakao M; Formats: CD, digital download, streaming; Track listing: 1. "OnlyOneOf You"; 2. "Picasso"; 3. "Fragile"	27	—	KOR: 5,077
Line Sun Goodness	Released: October 30, 2019; Label: RSVP, 8D Creative, Kakao M; Formats: CD, digital download, streaming; Track listing: 1. "Sage"; 2. "Time Machine"; 3. "Boss"; 4. "Desert"; 5. "Heartbreak Terminal"; 6. "OnlyOneOf Me"	31	—	KOR: 6,072
Instinct Part. 1	Released: April 8, 2021; Label: 8D Entertainment, Genie Music, Stone; Formats: CD, digital download, streaming; Track listing: 1. "Libido"; 2. "Instinct"; 3. "Byredo"; 4. "Tear of God"	5	—	KOR: 57,961
Instinct Part. 2	Released: January 14, 2022; Label: 8D Entertainment, Genie Music, Stone; Formats: CD, digital download, streaming; Track listing: 1. "Skinz"; 2. "Suit Dance"; 3. "Gaslighting"; 4. "Ultimate Bliss"	5	—	KOR: 51,090
Chrome Arts	Released: February 15, 2023; Label: Imperial; Formats: CD, digital download, streaming; Track listing: 1. "Suit Dance (Japanese ver.)" 2. "Chrome Arts"; 3. "ズルい女"; 4. "Libido (Japanese ver.)" 5. "Dora Maar (Japanese ver.)" 6. "Boss (Japanese ver.)"	—	5	JPN: 8,087
Seoul Collection	Released: March 2, 2023; Label: 8D Entertainment, Genie Music, Stone; Formats: CD, digital download, streaming; Track listing: 1. "Chrome Hearts"; 2. "Seoul Drift"; 3. "Mirage"; 4. "Candy Bomb"; 5. "Blueblueseoul"; 6. "Nabi"; 7. "Dora Maar (English ver.)"	3	—	KOR: 47,852
Things I Can't Say Love	Released: January 10, 2024; Label: 8D Entertainment, Genie Music, Stone; Formats: CD, digital download, streaming; Track listing: 1. "Things I Can't Say Love - Instrumental"; 2. "Dopamine"; 3. "Give Me the Love, Bitxx"; 4. "O"; 5. "Gravity"	10	—	KOR: 49,961

=== Single albums ===
Title	Details	Peak chart positions	Sales
Title	Details	KOR	Sales
Produced by [ ] Part 1	Released: May 21, 2020; Label: RSVP, 8D Creative, Genie Music, Stone; Formats: CD, digital download, streaming; Track listing: 1. "Designer (prod. by Boycold)"; 2. "Angel (prod. by Gray)"; 3. "Heartbreak Theatre (prod. by Cha Cha Malone)"	11	KOR: 20,072
Produced by [ ] Part 2	Released: August 27, 2020; Label: RSVP, 8D Creative, Genie Music, Stone; Formats: CD, digital download, streaming; Tracklisting: 1. "Bloom (prod. by Samuel Seo)"; 2. "A Song of Ice & Fire (prod. by GroovyRoom)"; 3. "Off Angel (prod. by JR Groove)"	8	KOR: 31,618
Produced by [Myself]	Released: July 15, 2021; Label: 8D Entertainment, Genie Music, Stone; Formats: CD, digital download, streaming; Track listing: 1. "Coy"; 2. "? (Question Mark)"; 3. "Night Flight"	—	—N/a

=== Singles ===
List of singles, showing year released, selected chart positions, and album
Title	Year	Peak chart positions			Sales	Album
Title	Year	KOR	JPN	JPN Hot	Sales	Album
Korean
"Time Leap"	2019	—	—	—	—N/a	Dot Point Jump
"Savanna"	2019	—	—	—	—N/a	Dot Point Jump
"Sage"	2019	—	—	—	—N/a	Line Sun Goodness
"Dora Maar"	2020	—	—	—	—N/a	Unknown Art Pop 2.1
"Money (OnlyOneOf Ver.)"	2020	—	—	—	—N/a	Yours Only 2.2
"Angel"	2020	—	—	—	—N/a	Produced by [ ] Part 1
"A Song Of Ice & Fire"	2020	—	—	—	—N/a	Produced by [ ] Part 2
"Libido"	2021	—	—	—	—N/a	Instinct Part. 1
"Mono"	2021	—	—	—	—N/a	Unknown Ballad 2.3
"Melting Snowman"	2021	—	—	—	—N/a	WarmWinterWishes
"Skinz"	2022	—	—	—	—N/a	Instinct Part. 2
"Seoul Drift"	2023	—	—	—	—N/a	Seoul Collection
"Evergreen"	2023	—	—	—	—N/a	Bump Up Business OST
"lOve me"	2023	—	—	—	—N/a	Bump Up Business OST
"D0pamine"	2024	—	—	—	—N/a	Things I Can't Say Love
"Stay"	2025	—	—	—	—N/a	Stay
Japanese
"Suit Dance"	2022	—	5	—	JPN: 13,227 (phy.)	Chrome Arts
"Cunning Woman" (ズルい女)	2022	—	13	92	JPN: 15,232 (phy.)	Chrome Arts
"Chrome Arts"	2023	—	—	—	—	Chrome Arts
"—" denotes a recording that did not chart or was not released in that territory.

== Filmography ==
=== Web series ===
Year	Title	Notes	Ref.
2023	Bump Up Business	All members	

== Concerts and tours ==
=== OnlyOneOf Grand America Tour ===
Date	City	Country	Venue	Ref.
March 29 & 31, 2023	Jersey City	United States	White Eagle Hall	
April 2, 2023	Chicago	United States	Park West	
April 4, 2023	Minneapolis	United States	The Lyric at The Skyway	
April 5, 2023	Atlanta	United States	The Masquerade	
April 7, 2023	Dallas	United States	South Side Music Hall	
April 9, 2023	San Juan, Puerto Rico	United States	Sala Sinfonica at Bellas Artes	
April 12, 2023	Phoenix	United States	Orpheum Theatre	
April 14, 2023	Monterrey	Mexico	Teatro de la Anda	
April 16, 2023	Mexico City	Mexico	Fronton Mexico	
April 19, 2023	Brasília	Brazil	Toinha Brasil Show	
April 21, 2023	São Paulo	Brazil	Vip Station	
April 23, 2023	Bogotá	Colombia	Teatro Ecci El Dorado	
April 25, 2023	Orlando	United States	The Plaza Live	
April 27, 2023	Toronto	Canada	George Weston Recital Hall	
April 29, 2023	San Francisco	United States	Fort Mason Cowell Theatre	
April 30, 2023	Los Angeles	United States	Avalon Hollywood	

=== OnlyOneOf dOpamine World Tour ===
Date	City	Country	Venue	Ref.
March 9–10, 2024	Seoul	South Korea	Sungshin University, Woonjung Green Campus	
March 27, 2024	Osaka	Japan	Gorilla Hall	
March 29, 2024	Tokyo	Japan	1000 Club	
April 4, 2024	São Paulo	Brazil	Studio Stage	
April 6, 2024	Montevideo	Uruguay	Montevideo Music Box	
April 10, 2024	Medellín	Colombia	City Hall El Rodeo	
April 12, 2024	Monterrey	Mexico	Foro Tims	
April 14, 2024	Mexico City	Mexico	Foro Puebla	
April 17, 2024	Vancouver	Canada	Vogue Theatre	
April 19, 2024	Chicago	United States	Copernicus Center	
April 21, 2024	New York	United States	United Palace Theatre	
April 24, 2024	Toronto	Canada	Queen Elizabeth Theatre	
April 26, 2024	Atlanta	United States	The Eastern	
April 28, 2024	San Juan	United States	Teatro Inter Bayamòn	
April 30, 2024	Orlando	United States	The Plaza Theatre	
May 1, 2024	Dallas	United States	South Side Music Hall	
May 3, 2024	San Francisco	United States	The Regency Ballroom	
May 5, 2024	Los Angeles	United States	The Novo	
June 2, 2024	London	United Kingdom	Heaven	
June 4, 2024	Paris	France	Yoyo - Palais de Tokyo	
June 6, 2024	Amsterdam	Netherlands	Panama	
June 7, 2024	Cologne	Germany	Carlswerk Victoria	
June 9, 2024	Munich	Germany	Tonhalle München	
June 12, 2024	Warsaw	Poland	Progesja	
June 14, 2024	Milan	Italy	Fabrique	
June 16, 2024	Madrid	Spain	La Nuevo Cubierta	
June 18, 2024	Barcelona	Spain	Sala 2 Razzmatazz	
July 2, 2024	Taipei	Taiwan	Zepp New Taipei	
July 4, 2024	Hong Kong	China		
July 5, 2024	Macau	China		
July 6, 2024	Manila	Philippines	Teatrino Promenade	
July 9, 2024	Ho Chi Minh	Vietnam		
July 11, 2024	Singapore			
July 13, 2024	Bangkok	Thailand		
July 16, 2024	Jakarta	Indonesia		
July 19, 2024	Sydney	Australia		
July 21, 2024	Melbourne	Australia		
