= 8D Creative =

Korean organization

8D Entertainment
- Native name: 에잇디엔터테인먼트
- Type: Private
- Industry: Music; Entertainment
- Genre: K-pop; R&B; EDM
- Founded: March 24, 2017; 9 years ago
- Founder: Kim Shin-ae
- Headquarters: B1, 27, Samseong-ro 95-gil, Gangnam-gu, Seoul, South Korea
- Area served: Asia
- Key people: Kim Shin-ae (founder and executive director); Park Jin-hyoung (president and CEO); Kim Kyung-jin (executive director)
- Products: Albums; Concerts; Music videos Movies; Fashion; Food service
- Services: Publishing records Music copyright Artist management Film/TV production Entertainment agency
- Owner: Kyungnam Pharm Healthcare (100%)
- Number of employees: 30
- Parent: Kyungnam Pharm Healthcare (since 2018)
- Website: http://8denter.com/en/home/

8D Entertainment (Korean: 에잇디크리에이티브) is a privately held entertainment and service group based in Seoul. It previously managed the group OnlyOneOf.

== History ==
The company was formed by Kim Shin-ae on March 23, 2017, as a food and beverage service company, operating the "8D Seoul Cafe" in Dosan Park Gangnam. Prior to founding 8D Creative, Kim had experience in founding the bakery goodovening (굿오브닝; later sold to a Japanese company) and the pizza chain Mick Jones's Pizza (믹존스 피자). The name "8D" is based on the :D (happy face) emoticon, which symbolizes both her experiences as a businesswoman and divorced single mom, as well as her mission to create a "funky" workplace.

8D Creative was later sold to ESV (now Kyungnam Pharm Healthcare), with Kim Shin-ae staying as president and CEO. The acquisition propelled the company's diversification to other industries including music and entertainment.

In the first half of 2018, 8D Creative trainee Kang Hye-won was sent to participate in the survival girl group television show Produce 48. She finished eighth and debuted as part of Iz*One.

On June 15, 2018, actor Kam Woo-sung signed the exclusive contract with 8D. On October 10, actress Yoo In-young also joined the company.

On April 30, 2019, 8D Creative established two new subsidiaries, an actor-specialized management WIP and an idol-specialized label RSVP.

On November 12, 2020, RSVP was renamed as 8D Entertainment and 8D Creative was integrated into the company. Kim Shin-ae became the executive director of the company, with Park Jin-hyoung replacing her as president and CEO.

== Former artists ==
- Choi Yoo-ha (2018–2019)
- Jeong Kang-hee (2018–2019)
- Kim Ki-beom (2018–2019)
- Lee So-ra (2018–2019)
- Tashiro Erina (2018–2019)
- Park Ji-yeon (2018–2020)
- Shin Ye-ji (2018–2020)
- Kang Ye-seul (2018–2021)
- Ko Sung-min (2018–2021)
- Yoo In-young (2018–2021)
- Gam Woo-sung
- Jeon Sa-ra
- Kim Ha-kyeong
- Kim I-ni
- Kim Min-jung
- Ko Tae-kyung
- Park Shin-ah
- Park Yoo-na
- Yang Mi-kyung
- Choi HEART (2022–2024)
- Kang Hye-won (2018–2025)
- OnlyOneOf (2019-2025)

== Discography ==
Artist	Title	Date	Format	Language	Distribution
Ko Sung-min	"Don't Let Me Know"	August 26, 2018	Digital single	Korean	Kakao M
OnlyOneOf	dot point jump	May 28, 2019	Extended play	Korean	Kakao M
Kang Ye-seul	Pongdang Pongdang	September 17, 2019	Digital single	Korean	Genie Music, Stone Music Entertainment
OnlyOneOf	line sun goodness	October 30, 2019	Extended play	Korean	Kakao M
OnlyOneOf	unknown art pop 2.1	January 30, 2020	Digital single	Korean	Kakao M
OnlyOneOf	yours only 2.2	April 10, 2020	Digital single	Korean	Genie Music, Stone Music Entertainment
OnlyOneOf	Produced by [] Pt. 1	May 21, 2020	Single album	Korean	Genie Music, Stone Music Entertainment
OnlyOneOf	Produced by [] Pt. 2	August 27, 2020	Single album	Korean	Genie Music, Stone Music Entertainment
OnlyOneOf	Instinct, Pt. 1	April 8, 2021	Extended play	Korean	Genie Music, Stone Music Entertainment
OnlyOneOf	Produced by [myself]	July 15, 2021	Single album	Korean	Genie Music, Stone Music Entertainment
OnlyOneOf	unknown ballad 2.3	September 10, 2021	Single album	Korean	Genie Music, Stone Music Entertainment
Kang Hye-won	W	December 22, 2021	Single album	Korean	Genie Music, Stone Music Entertainment
OnlyOneOf	WarmWinterWishes	December 23, 2021	Single album	Korean	Genie Music, Stone Music Entertainment
OnlyOneOf	OnlyOneOf JAPAN BEST ALBUM	January 12, 2022	Compilation album	Japanese	Teichiku Records
OnlyOneOf	Instinct, Pt. 2	January 14, 2022	Extended play	Korean	Genie Music, Stone Music Entertainment
Choi HEART	"Elastic Love"	February 7, 2022	Digital single	Korean	Genie Music, Stone Music Entertainment
Choi HEART	"Elastic Love (Japanese Ver.)"	February 23, 2022	Digital single	Japanese	Teichiku Records
OnlyOneOf	suit dance (Japanese ver.)	May 18, 2022	Extended play	Japanese	Teichiku Records
YooJung (OnlyOneOf)	undergrOund idOl #1	June 27, 2022	Single album	Korean	Genie Music, Stone Music Entertainment
KB (OnlyOneOf)	undergrOund idOl #2	July 26, 2022	Single album	Korean	Genie Music, Stone Music Entertainment
Kang Hye-won	"Like a Diamond (With. Stella Jang)"	June 9, 2022	Digital single	Korean	Genie Music
Choi HEART	"Million"	August 20, 2022	Digital single	Korean	Genie Music, Stone Music Entertainment
JunJi (OnlyOneOf)	undergrOund idOl #3	August 25, 2022	Single album	Korean	Genie Music, Stone Music Entertainment
OnlyOneOf	ズルい女	October 19, 2022	Extended play	Japanese	Teichiku Records
Rie (OnlyOneOf)	undergrOund idOl #4	October 26, 2022	Single album	Korean	Genie Music, Stone Music Entertainment
Mill (OnlyOneOf)	undergrOund idOl #5	November 28, 2022	Single album	Korean	Genie Music, Stone Music Entertainment
Nine (OnlyOneOf)	undergrOund idOl #6	January 4, 2023	Single album	Korean	Genie Music, Stone Music Entertainment
OnlyOneOf	chrOme arts	February 15, 2023	Extended play	Japanese	Teichiku Records
OnlyOneOf	seOul cOllectiOn	March 2, 2023	Extended play	Korean	Genie Music, Stone Music Entertainment
Choi HEART	"5min to heartbreak"	April 10, 2023	Digital single	Korean	Genie Music, Stone Music Entertainment
Choi HEART	"No.5"	July 14, 2023	Digital single	Korean	Genie Music, Stone Music Entertainment
