= Way Back Love =

2025 South Korean television series

- Promotional poster
- Hangul: 내가 죽기 일주일 전
- Hanja: 내가 죽기 一週日 前
- Lit.: A Week Before I Die
- RR: Naega jukgi iljuil jeon
- MR: Naega chukki ilchuil chŏn
- Genre: Coming-of-age; Romantic fantasy
- Created by: Roh Deok
- Based on: Way Back Love by Seo Eun-chae
- Written by: Song Hyeon-ju; Jang In-jung
- Directed by: Choi Ha-na
- Starring: Gong Myung; Kim Min-ha
- Country of origin: South Korea
- Original language: Korean
- No. of episodes: 6

Production
- Running time: 45 minutes
- Production companies: CJ ENM; Mondo Studio

Original release
- Network: TVING
- Release: April 3 – April 17, 2025

Way Back Love (Korean: 내가 죽기 일주일 전) is a 2025 South Korean coming-of-age romantic fantasy television series created by Roh Deok, written by Song Hyeon-ju and Jang In-jung, directed by Choi Ha-na, and starring Gong Myung and Kim Min-ha. Based on the novel of the same name by Seo Eun-chae. It was released on TVING from April 3–17, 2025. It is also available for streaming on Viki and Viu in selected regions.

Way Back Love was invited as one of the six drama series in the On Screen section of the 29th Busan International Film Festival.

== Synopsis ==
It tells the story of how 24-year-old Jeong Hee-wan, who has been living like a hikikomori with no will to live, is told she will die in a week by her childhood friend and first love, Kim Ram-woo, who appears to her as a grim reaper.

== Cast and characters ==
=== Main ===
- Gong Myung as Kim Ram-woo
- Kim Min-ha as Jeong Hee-wan

=== Supporting ===
- Jung Gun-joo as Lee Hong-seok
- Oh Woo-ri as Yoon Tae-kyung
- Ko Chang-seok as Jeong Il-beom
- Seo Young-hee as Kim Jung-sook
- Jeon Chae-eun as Jeong Hee-joo
- Jeon Jun-ho as Seung-ho

=== Special appearances ===
- Shim Eun-kyung as Young-hyun
- Krystal Jung as a senior grim reaper

== Production ==
=== Development ===
The series is based on the novel of the same name by Seo Eun-chae. Director Roh Deok, who directed the films Very Ordinary Couple (2013) and The Exclusive: Beat the Devil's Tattoo (2015), and Netflix's series Glitch (2022) participated as the creator and producer while director Choi Ha-na, who directed More Than Family (2020), took the megaphone. It is written by Song Hyeon-ju and Jang In-jung, planned and produced by the film division of CJ ENM along with Studio Mondo.

=== Casting ===
Both Gong Myung and Kim Min-ha were confirmed as lead actors for the series in November 2023. Two months later, TVING revealed the casting lineup namely Gong, Kim, Jung Gun-joo, Oh Woo-ri, Ko Chang-seok, and Seo Young-hee.

== Original soundtrack ==
=== Part 1 ===
The song is the original soundtrack of drama A Girl Who Sees Smells by Loco & Yuju which was re-arranged by Moon Jung-wook and Yuju for this drama

Released on March 9, 2024
No.	Title	Lyrics	Music	Artist	Length
1.	"Spring Is Gone By Chance" (우연히 봄)	Choi Jae-woo; Yuju	Crazy Park; Peter Pan; Noheul	Yuju	3:38
2.	"Spring Is Gone By Chance" (우연히 봄; Inst.)		Crazy Park; Peter Pan; Noheul		3:38
Total length:					7:16

=== Part 2 ===
Released on April 6, 2025
No.	Title	Lyrics	Music	Artist	Length
1.	"Best Luck"	Loco; Dennis Chang	Dennis Chang	Loco & Jaeyeon	3:16
2.	"Best Luck" (Inst.)		Dennis Chang		3:16
Total length:					6:32

=== Part 3 ===
Released on April 10, 2025
No.	Title	Lyrics	Music	Artist	Length
1.	"If You"	8hoop; Kim Min	Kim Min; 8hoop	Kim Tae-rae (Zerobaseone)	3:42
2.	"If You" (Inst.)		Kim Min; 8hoop		3:42
Total length:					7:24

== Release ==
In November 2024, TVING revealed its 2025 original content lineup and Way Back Love is one of the series to be released in 2025. In March 2025, the series was confirmed to premiere on April 3, with two episodes release each week at 12:00 (KST). It is also available for streaming on Viki and Viu in selected regions.

The series was invited as one of the six drama series in the On Screen section of the 29th Busan International Film Festival on October 2–11, 2024, where three out of six episodes had its world premiere.

== Reception ==
=== Accolades ===
Award ceremony	Year	Category	Nominee	Result	Ref.
Blue Dragon Series Awards	2025	Best Drama	Way Back Love	Nominated	
Blue Dragon Series Awards	2025	Best New Actress	Kim Min-ha	Won	
ContentAsia Awards	2026	Best Female Lead in a TV Programme/Series Made in Asia	Kim Min-ha	Nominated	
