= Kang Hye-won =

South Korean actress and singer (born 1999)

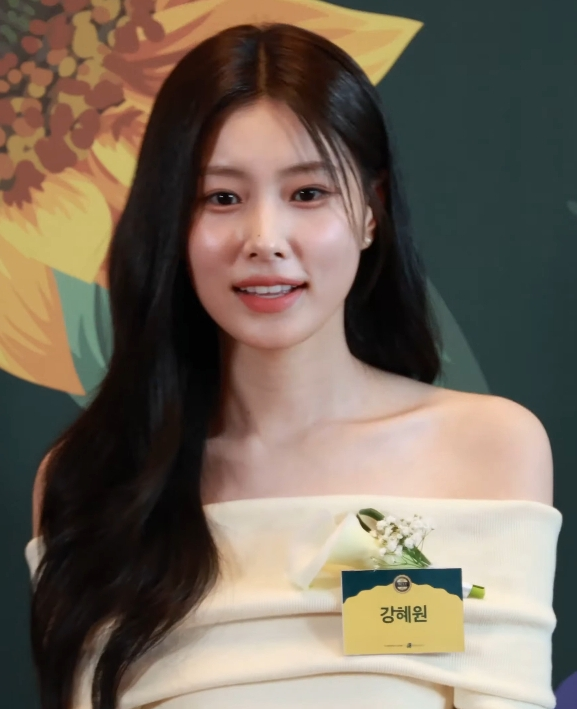
- Kang in May 2024
- Born: July 5, 1999 (age 27); Yangsan, South Korea
- Education: Hanlim Multi Art School
- Occupations: Actress; singer
- Years active: 2018–present
- Agent: Peace Entertainment
- Musical career
- Genres: K-pop; J-pop
- Instruments: Vocals
- Years active: 2018–2022
- Labels: 8D Entertainment; Off the Record (Note: As a member of Iz*One only.); EMI
- Formerly of: Iz*One

Korean name
- Hangul: 강혜원
- RR: Gang Hyewon
- MR: Kang Hyewŏn

Signature
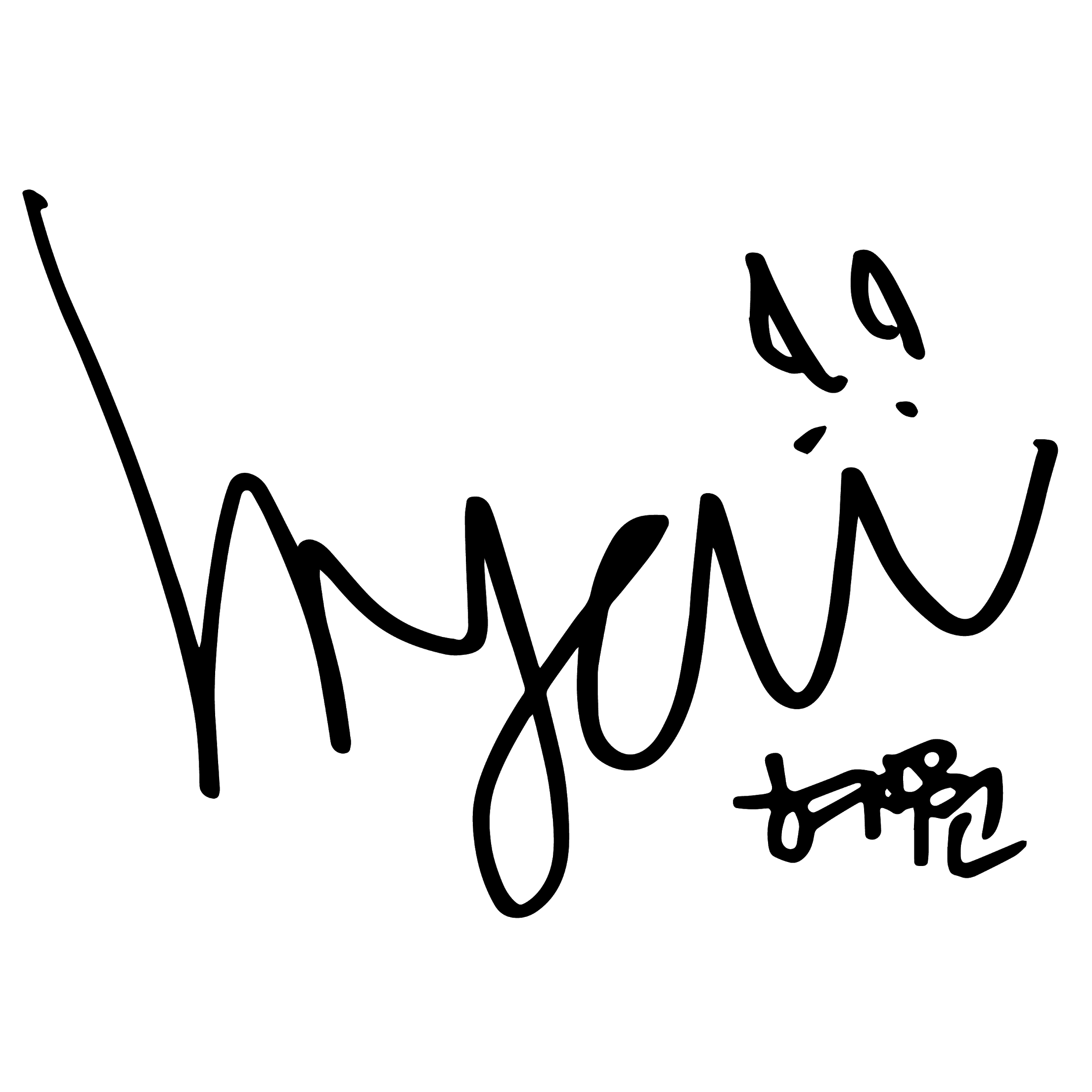

Kang Hye-won (Korean: 강혜원; born July 5, 1999) is a South Korean actress and former singer. She was a member of the South Korean–Japanese girl group Iz*One from 2018 to 2021. As an actress, she has starred in works including Boyhood (2023) and Friendly Rivalry (2025).

== Early life ==
Kang was born in Yangsan, South Korea, on July 5, 1999. She attended Bokwang High School in Yangsan, then she transferred to Hanlim Multi Art School.

== Career ==
=== 2018: Produce 48 & debut with Iz*One ===
Kang was announced to be a part of Produce 48 in 2018. She finished in 8th place with 248,432 votes securing her place in Iz*One. The group made their official debut on October 29, 2018, with the song titled "La Vie en Rose", from their debut extended play Color*Iz.

=== 2021–2022: Solo activities, W, and acting debut ===
After Iz*One officially concluded activities on April 29, 2021, Kang returned to being a trainee under 8D Creative. On July 21, Kang made her acting debut in the third season of the web series Best Mistake, portraying the character Jin Se-hee. On July 27, she made an appearance in Parc Jae-jung's "Hobby" music video. In August, Kang was confirmed as a cast member of MBC's variety show How A Family is Made.

On December 8, a teaser video was revealed on her YouTube channel, announcing the upcoming release of a winter special album, W. On December 22, she released the album with "Winter Poem" as the lead single.

On June 9, 2022, Kang released the single "Like A Diamond", featuring Stella Jang.

On July 6, Playlist Studio announced Kang as one of the casts in Seasons of Blossom, a webdrama adaptation of webtoon of the same name. Kang will portray the role of Yoon Bo-mi.

=== 2023–present: Rising popularity ===
In August 2023, it was revealed that Kang starred in a Coupang Play series Boyhood which aired on November 24, 2023. Boyhood became a hit in South Korea, experiencing viewers increase during its airing, it stayed within Top 10 most watched OTT Drama until its finale. A total of 2,914% viewers increase during the finale compared to the first week was recorded. As a result of Boyhood's popularity and success, the Entertainment Industry Insiders mentioned Kang as one of the "2024 Rising Actress to Look Forward to". On April 29, 2025, Kang departed 8D Entertainment and signed a contract with Peace Entertainment. On September 30, 2025, Kang made her first leading role in the Japanese drama Gimbap and Onigiri alongside Eiji Akaso.

== Endorsements ==
On November 12, 2021, Kang landed her first CF deal with the camera app SODA. On December 24, the global sports brand New Balance announced Kang as their pictorial model for their new backpack with the theme "MBTI Concept New Semester Backpack".

On January 13, 2022, through her own YouTube channel, Kang announced a collaboration with a skincare line, Uriid, where she was in charge of the promotional design of the new product, Uriid Neroli Garden Ampoule Stick. According to Uriid, after the promotional video with Kang was released on her YouTube channel, the product started selling high on social media and online stores, particularly in Hyundai Home Shopping. On March 30, Kang collaborated with Onitsuka Tiger Korea to promote their shoes collection with a fashion pictorial on Elle Korea. On May 30, Kang was chosen by the British premium bag brand, Radley London, to promote their new 2022 Spring/Summer Collection bags Forest Way-Smoking and Duke Place through a pictorial on atstar1 magazine. On June 8, a South Korean clothing brand, General Idea, announced Kang as their new muse and fashion brand model for their 2022 Summer Collection with the theme "Bloomy Sunday". Kang continued working with General Idea as their muse for their 22FW Woman Part.2 Collection by dropping new pictorials on September 13. On June 27, Nexon announced Kang as their advertising model for their online game Mabinogi. On July 18, Kang announced a collaboration with LEGO to promote their three-dimensional reproduction of Vincent van Gogh's Starry Night. On October 6, ma:nyo, a Korean cosmetic brand, announced Kang Hye-won as their new ambassador for their lipstick collection, No Mercy Spell Mood Stick, and for their skincare collection, V.collagen Heart Fit.

On January 9, 2023, Korean clothing company Roem announced Kang as their 2023 Spring/Summer season campaign model. Kang continued working for Roem throughout half of 2023, also modeling for the Fall collection. Their collaboration with Kang created a new slogan for Roem, "Romantic Is Everywhere", and it was reported that Roem sales increased by 30% after choosing Kang as their muse. On March 2, 2023, Nexon announced Kang as their special character for their game Sudden Attack.

On February 8, 2024, Korean sport fashion brand MLB announced Kang as their pictorial model for their Varsity spring collection through Vogue Korea. On April 12, 2024, Vaseline Korea announced on their Instagram that Kang has become the model for their Lip Therapy product. On April 30, Unilever Korea announced Kang as the official 24th brand ambassador of Vaseline Korea for their Lip Therapy campaign. On May 22, 2024, Kang was announced as Narciso Rodriguez Korea's pictorial model for their summer perfume collection. On November 15, 2024, Wacky Willy released a cinematic video featuring Kang Hye-won and Ko Kyung-pyo for their Black Friday sales campaign.

On January 31, 2025, Nexon announced Kang as their special character for their game Sudden Attack. On February 14, 2025, Korean beauty brand, MIMZ announced Kang as their model. On April 14, 2025, Japanese fashion brand, SNIDEL announced Kang as their summer collection model.

== Discography ==
=== Extended plays ===
List of extended plays, showing selected details, selected chart positions, and sales figures
Title	Details	Peak chart positions	Sales
Title	Details	KOR	Sales
W	Released: December 22, 2021; Label: 8D, Stone Music, Genie Music; Formats: CD, digital download, streaming; Track listing: 1. "W"; 2. "Winter Poem"; 3. "Snowy Day" (눈이 오는 날); 4. "First Love Letter"; 5. "Winter Again" (내년 겨울에도 기억해줘)	6	KOR: 19,999

=== Singles ===
List of singles, showing year released, chart positions, and album name
Title	Year	Peak chart positions	Album
Title	Year	KOR	Album
"First Love Letter"	2021	— (Note: "First Love Letter" did not enter Gaon Digital Chart, but peaked at position 188 on component Download Chart.)	W
"Winter Poem"	2021	— (Note: "Winter Poem" did not enter Gaon Digital Chart, but peaked at position 66 on component Download Chart.)	W
"Like A Diamond" (with Stella Jang)	2022	— (Note: "Like A Diamond" did not enter Gaon Digital Chart, but peaked at position 150 on component Download Chart.)	Non-album single
"—" denotes a recording that did not chart or was not released in that region.

=== Other charted songs ===
List of other charted songs, showing year released, chart positions, and album name
Title	Year	Peak chart positions	Album
Title	Year	KOR	Album
"Snowy Day" (눈이 오는 날)	2021	— (Note: "Snowy Day" did not enter Gaon Digital Chart, but peaked at position 182 on component Download Chart.)	W
"—" denotes a recording that did not chart or was not released in that region.

=== Songwriting credits ===
All song credits are adapted from the Korea Music Copyright Association's database unless stated otherwise.

List of songs, showing year released, artist name, and name of the album
Title	Year	Artist	Album	Notes
"With*One"	2020	Iz*One	Oneiric Diary	As lyricist

== Videography ==
=== Music videos ===
Title	Year	Director(s)	Ref.
"First Love Letter"	2021	Unknown	
"Winter Poem"	2021	Unknown	

== Filmography ==
=== Television series ===
Year	Title	Role	Notes	Ref.
2024	The Player 2: Master of Swindlers	Miyoo	Cameo, Episode 2	
2025	Oh My Ghost Clients	Lee Yeo-jin	Special appearance, Episode 2 & 8	
2025	To the Moon	Seon-hwa	Cameo, Episode 1	
2026	Gimbap and Onigiri	Park Rin	Japanese drama	

=== Web series ===
Year	Title	Role	Ref.
2022	Best Mistake 3	Jin Se-hee	
2022	Seasons of Blossom	Yoon Bo-mi	
2023	Boyhood	Kang Seon-hwa	
2025	Friendly Rivalry	Joo Ye-ri	
2025	Spirit Fingers	An Ye-rim	

=== Television shows ===
Year	Title	Role	Notes	Ref.
2018	Produce 48	Contestant	Finished 8th	
2021	We Became A Family	Cast member		

=== Web show ===
Year	Title	Role	Notes	Ref.
2021–2022	Adola Travel Agency: Cheat-ing Trip	Host	Season 1–2	

=== Music video appearances ===
Year	Title	Artist	Ref.
2021	"Hobby"	Parc Jae-jung	
2022	"Winner"	Ravi	
2025	"1,2,3,4,5"	Coogie	
2026	"幸せの色 (shiawase no iro)"	Masanori Otoda	

== Bibliography ==
Year	Title	Publisher	Type	Ref.
2021	Kang Hye Won 1st Edition Photo Book: Beauty Cut	8D Entertainment, Danal Entertainment	Solo photobook	
2021	Collection of Essay	8D Entertainment	Season Greetings	
2022	Fleur	8D Entertainment, Wonderwall	Photobook	
2023	Hyem's Candy	8D Entertainment	Season Greetings	
2024	quatre saisons	8D Entertainment	Season Greetings	

== Awards and nominations ==
Name of the award ceremony, year presented, category, nominee of the award, and the result of the nomination
Award ceremony	Year	Category	Nominee / Work	Result	Ref.
APAN Star Awards	2024	Best New Actress	Boyhood	Nominated	
Brand Customer Loyalty Award	2024	Female Actress – Rookie	Kang Hye-won	Won	
Korea Drama Awards	2024	Best New Actress	Boyhood	Won	
