= Oh Woo-ri =

South Korean actress (born 1996)

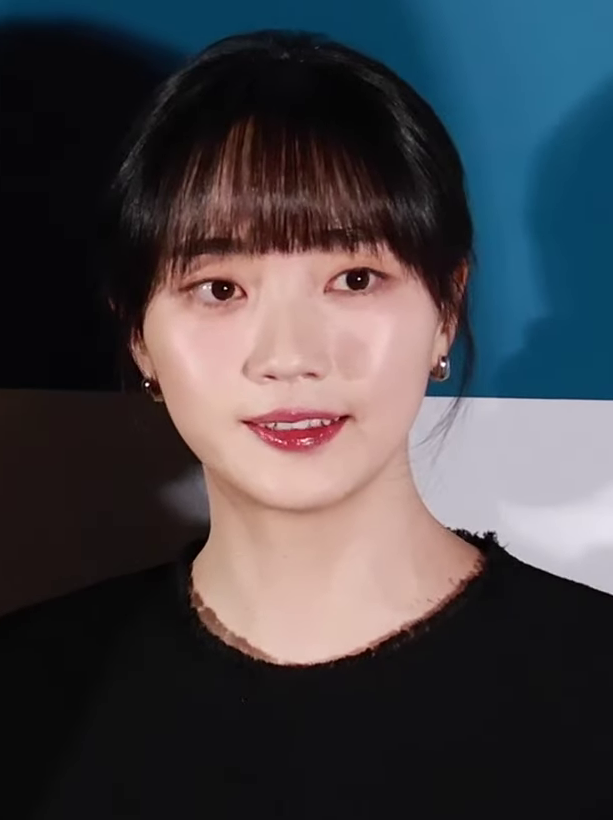
- Oh in 2025
- Born: August 6, 1996 (age 30); South Korea
- Education: Soongsil University – Department of Theater and Film
- Occupation: Actress
- Years active: 2022–present
- Agent: Saram Entertainment

Korean name
- Hangul: 오우리
- RR: O Uri
- MR: O Uri

Oh Woo-ri (Korean: 오우리; born August 6, 1996) is a South Korean actress. She is well known for her character Choi Kyung in Friendly Rivalry.

== Career ==
Oh Woo-ri, who completed a major in Soongsil University's Department of Theater and Film, debuted in 2022 through a major role in Hail to Hell. She was awarded with the Creative Artist Award at the 11th Muju Film Festival for her performance in the movie itself. Oh's early works also include You and I (2023), One Day Off (2023) and Welcome to Samdal-ri (2023–24).

In 2024, Oh appeared in No Way Out: The Roulette, and she portrayed Park Eun-jeong, a police officer who helps the main protagonist, Detective Baek Joong-sik (played by Cho Jin-woong), to find his missing daughter. Oh's character gained attention from viewers and left a strong impression with her detailed acting.

In 2025, Oh appeared as high school girl Choi Kyung, who was always in second place in her class and school, in Friendly Rivalry. Her performance as the character garnered widespread attention and praise from viewers. Oh is set to appear on upcoming romantic fantasy drama Way Back Love, which is set to air on April 3, 2025.

== Filmography ==
=== Television ===
- One Day Off (2023) as Kim Yoon-seo
- Welcome to Samdal-ri (2023–24) as Bu Mi-ja (young)
- A Killer Paradox (2024) as Kang Mi-yeong
- No Way Out: The Roulette (2024) as Park Eun-jeong
- Friendly Rivalry (2025) as Choi Kyung
- Way Back Love (2025) as Yoon Tae-kyung

=== Film ===
- Hail to Hell (2022) as Na-mi
- You and I (2023) – role unknown
- I, the Executioner (2024) – role unknown
