= Friendly Rivalry =

2025 South Korean television series

- Promotional poster
- Hangul: 선의의 경쟁
- RR: Seonuiui gyeongjaeng
- MR: Sŏnŭiŭi kyŏngjaeng
- Genre: Teen drama; Mystery; Thriller
- Based on: Friendly Rivalry by Song Chae-yoon and Shim Jae-young
- Written by: Kim Tae-hee; Min Ye-ji
- Directed by: Kim Tae-hee
- Starring: Lee Hye-ri; Chung Su-bin; Kang Hye-won; Oh Woo-ri
- Music by: Kim Dong-wook
- Country of origin: South Korea
- Original language: Korean
- No. of episodes: 16

Production
- Running time: 30 minutes
- Production companies: Ylab Plex; Studio X+U

Original release
- Network: U+ Mobile TV
- Release: February 10 – March 6, 2025

Friendly Rivalry (Korean: 선의의 경쟁) is a South Korean teen mystery thriller television series based on the webtoon of the same name by Song Chae-yoon and Shim Jae-young, starring Lee Hye-ri, Chung Su-bin, Kang Hye-won, and Oh Woo-ri. It was released on U+ Mobile TV from February 10, to March 6, 2025, every Monday to Thursday at 00:00 (KST).

== Plot ==
Woo Seul-gi, a girl who grew up in an orphanage after getting lost during a school trip as a child, transfers to Chaehwa Girls' High School, one of the top 1% in South Korea. While facing a cutthroat college entrance exam competition, she gets entangled in the mystery surrounding the suspicious death of her father, who was a member of the CSAT committee.

== Cast ==
=== Main ===
- Lee Hye-ri as Yoo Jae-yi
- Chung Su-bin as Woo Seul-gi
- Kang Hye-won as Joo Ye-ri
- Oh Woo-ri as Choi Kyung
- Choi Young-jae as Nam Byeong-jin
- Kim Tae-hoon as Yoo Tae-joon

=== Supporting ===
- Chae Seo-eun as Jo A-ra
- Kim Sang-ji as Kim Bum-soo
- Na Hyun-jin as Goo Chae-ryung
- Chu Ye-jin as Yoo Je-na
- Han Lee-ie as Lee Si-woo
- Ma Hyeon-ji as Park Byung-hee
- Go Da-hyun as Kim Na-ri

== Production ==
=== Development ===
The series was planned by Studio X+U and produced by Ylab Plex and Studio X+U. It is a dramatization of the webtoon of the same name written by Song Chae-yoon, illustrated by Shim Jae-young and produced by Ylab, and, compared to the original work, it added the mystery surrounding Woo Do-hyuk's death.

Friendly Rivalry was directed by Kim Tae-hee, who co-wrote the script together with Min Ye-ji. At the series' press conference, Kim stated that she accepted the offer to direct it immediately when she was first asked to write the script in 2021 because, "First, there was no good person among the characters, and second, the fact that there were a lot of women was appealing." She also thought that it would be fun to picture "these slightly crazy girls, each hiding their own secrets, engaging in a bloody competition and alternatively becoming friends or enemies." As for the script, Kim said that she wanted the drama to be persuasive to the viewers and hoped that the characters would be ultimately understandable, stating "Our work is a story about everyone who has not learned how to lose in a society that only teaches how to win. If you know that there's definitely a next chapter in life even if you fall and fail, you just have to dust yourself off and get back up and start your own race again. I wrote and directed with the hope that Jae-yi, Seul-gi, Ye-ri, and Kyung will know that the true competition in life begins from that moment." During the four years of development, the director met with female high school students, and consulted with psychiatrists and teachers.

=== Casting ===
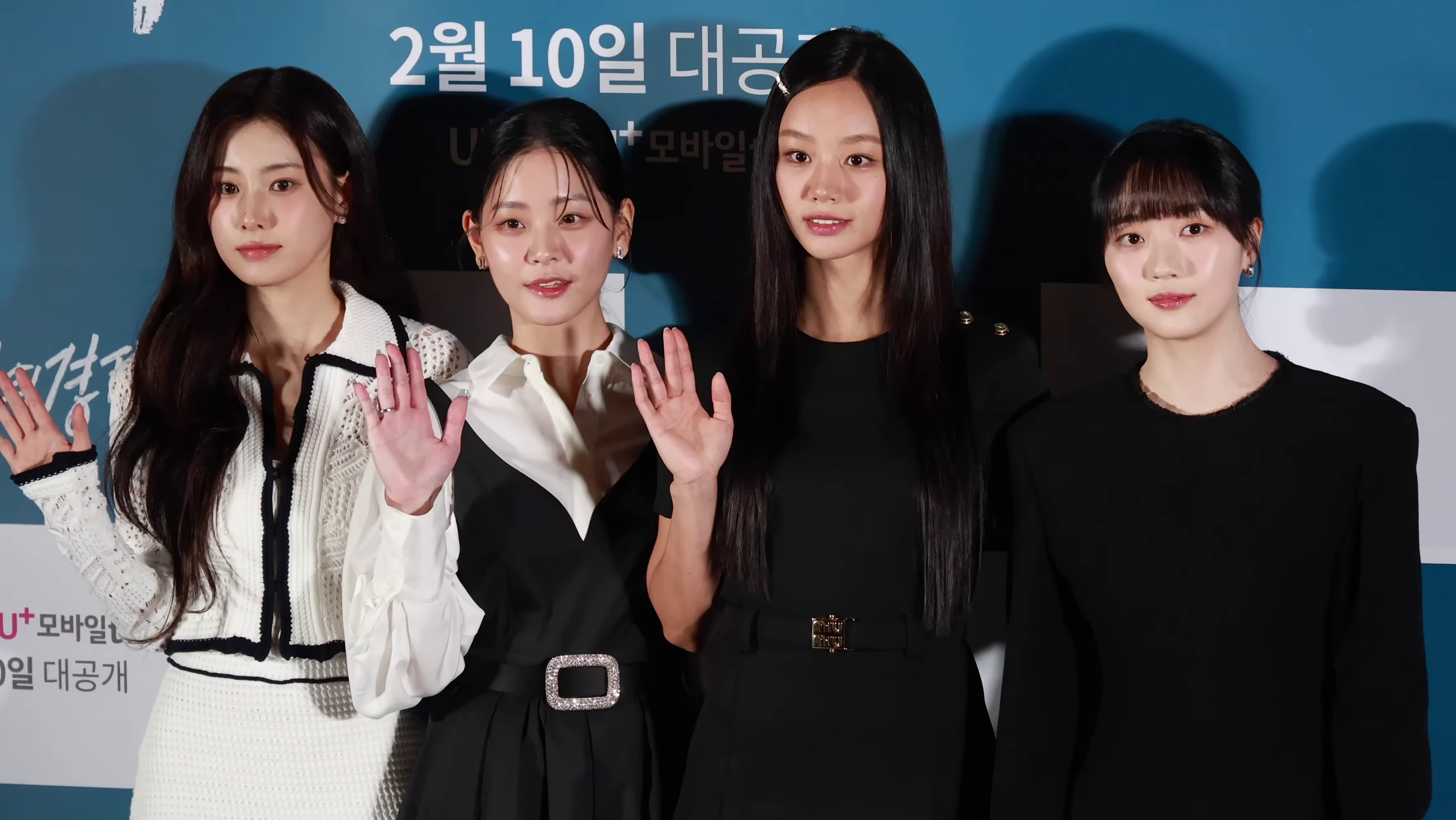
The main cast of Friendly Rivalry. From left to right: Kang, Chung, Lee, and Oh.

On July 23, 2024, Studio X+U announced that Lee Hye-ri, Chung Su-bin, Kang Hye-won, and Oh Woo-ri would work together to tell the story of high school girls. On July 24, Andbut Company stated that Choi Young-jae had been cast for the series.

Lee Hye-ri stars as Yoo Jae-yi, the top student of Chaehwa Girls' High School and a hospital director's daughter. When questioned about the reasons behind her decision to take on a role that involved smoking and a same-sex kissing scene, she said that, despite being burdensome in some ways, she really wanted to participate, explaining: "When I looked into the story, I thought that there were parts that could only be understood when you are in your late 20s. That's why I took courage regardless of my age. It's not easy to participate in a school drama as time goes by, so I became even greedier." As for the same-sex kiss scene with co-star Chung Su-bin, Lee Hye-ri commented that she wasn't worried because she thought it could clearly show the two characters' conflicts and obsessions. She also added that Jae-yi was starkly different from her previous, warm and smiling roles. Chung Su-bin said that she auditioned because it was a scenario never seen before in Korea that broke away from the framework of existing dramas. Kang Hye-won shared that she had found the "girl thriller" genre attractive and interesting, with Oh Woo-ri adding that the charm of each character was the most important part.

=== Filming and release ===
Filming started in August 2024; as of October, more than half was done.

Friendly Rivalry was given a youth viewing restriction. Director Kim Tae-hee stated that they had in mind from the beginning that it was not intended for teenagers because they wanted to reflect reality.

== Episodes ==
No.	Title	Directed by	Written by	Original release date
1	"Episode 1"	Kim Tae-hee	Kim Tae-hee, Min Ye-ji	February 10, 2025
After living in an orphanage, Woo Seul-gi enrolls at a prestigious high school with the goal of finding her father, but stumbles into the most well known student at the school in the process.
2	"Episode 2"	Kim Tae-hee	Kim Tae-hee, Min Ye-ji	February 11, 2025
As Seul-gi participates in an exam, she realizes that the questions are the same as her practice ones. As they had been sent by an anonymous source, she questions how this is possible, causing her to adventure to a local academy, where she faces Jae-yi.
3	"Episode 3"	Kim Tae-hee	Kim Tae-hee, Min Ye-ji	February 12, 2025
Due to an unfortunate event that happened at the prestigious high school, Seul-gi has been gifted a new uniform from Jae-yi, leading her to trust Jae-yi more and try to rekindle their complex relationship.
4	"Episode 4"	Kim Tae-hee	Kim Tae-hee, Min Ye-ji	February 13, 2025
As Seul-gi and Jae-yi's relationship grows, Seul-gi ends up having a sleepover at Jae-yi's home. Restless, Seul-gi awakes to see a startling notification on Jae-yi's phone that changes everything.
5	"Episode 5"	Kim Tae-hee	Kim Tae-hee, Min Ye-ji	February 17, 2025
After completing a test, Seul-gi successfully receives the top score. As Jae-yi reacts to this information differently than her classmates, Seul-gi is left unbothered.
6	"Episode 6"	Kim Tae-hee	Kim Tae-hee, Min Ye-ji	February 18, 2025
Although Seul-gi and Jae-yi's relationship has been growing, a turn of events leaves Seul-gi feeling betrayed. With the stress of midterms coming up, Seul-gi has no choice but to turn back to her past illegal activities to retrieve her medication.
7	"Episode 7"	Kim Tae-hee	Kim Tae-hee, Min Ye-ji	February 19, 2025
Seul-gi's accomplishments within school lead her to be top of her class, along with Jae-yi. With medical check ups coming soon, Seul-gi is concerned that her medication will impact the results of the exam.
8	"Episode 8"	Kim Tae-hee	Kim Tae-hee, Min Ye-ji	February 20, 2025
After the shocking betrayal, Seul-gi determines that she's willing to try and trust Jae-yi again. However, during their school festival, Jae-yi seems to have ulterior motives that leads to a surprising discovery.
9	"Episode 9"	Kim Tae-hee	Kim Tae-hee, Min Ye-ji	February 24, 2025
An unfortunate event leads to Seul-gi being admitted to the hospital. However, Jae-yi's discovery leads to her running into an individual within their school.
10	"Episode 10"	Kim Tae-hee	Kim Tae-hee, Min Ye-ji	February 25, 2025
After the tragedy at the school festival, Jae-yi visits Seul-gi at the hospital. Unfortunately, Seul-gi is painted as the villain and this leads Jae-yi to have to make a finalizing decision.
11	"Episode 11"	Kim Tae-hee	Kim Tae-hee, Min Ye-ji	February 26, 2025
Seul-gi and Jae-yi are on a mission to find Jae-yi's missing sister. Jae-yi faces a close friend of hers who may know about her sister's disappearance. Ultimately, they receive a phone call that may provide them with find about Jae-yi's sister's location.
12	"Episode 12"	Kim Tae-hee	Kim Tae-hee, Min Ye-ji	February 27, 2025
Jae-yi confronts some of her friends about her sister's disappearance, which leads to some resolution about the issue. Soon, Jae-yi receives a phone call that contains unfortunate news.
13	"Episode 13"	Kim Tae-hee	Kim Tae-hee, Min Ye-ji	March 3, 2025
Seul-gi is able to determine more information about Jae-yi's sister, finding out the truth while looking for one of their classmates. This allows Jae-yi and Seul-gi to work to team up.
14	"Episode 14"	Kim Tae-hee	Kim Tae-hee, Min Ye-ji	March 4, 2025
As the search for Jae-yi's sister continues, Jae-yi's father leaves a terrifying threat against Seul-gi that would lead Jae-yi to make a shocking decision.
15	"Episode 15"	Kim Tae-hee	Kim Tae-hee, Min Ye-ji	March 5, 2025
After the final exams concluded, the high school sees a shift in the class rankings. Seul-gi and Jae-yi face their past trust issues again due to Jae-yi's unpredictability. Jae-yi's father offers Seul-gi help with the test that may benefit her with college entrance exams.
16	"Episode 16"	Kim Tae-hee	Kim Tae-hee, Min Ye-ji	March 6, 2025
Seul-gi and Jae-yi face trouble when their plans clash, and this leads to another betrayal.

== Original soundtrack ==
=== Part 1 ===
Released on February 10, 2025
No.	Title	Lyrics	Music	Artist	Length
1.	"Burn It Down"	Park Shin-ae; Jeon Hae-jeong; Lee Gwan-hyung	Lee Kwan-hyung; Jeon Hae-jeong; Park Shin-ae	Kim Ye-ji (Kardi)	03:34
2.	"Burn It Down" (Inst.)		Lee Kwan-hyung; Jeon Hae-jeong; Park Shin-ae		03:34
Total length:					07:08

=== Part 2 ===
Released on February 17, 2025
No.	Title	Lyrics	Music	Artist	Length
1.	"Eternal Maze"	Jung So-hyun	Jung So-hyun; Shin Hye-won; Park Seong-min	Elaine	3:17
2.	"Eternal Maze" (Inst.)		Jung So-hyun; Shin Hye-won; Park Seong-min		3:17
Total length:					6:34

=== Part 3 ===
Released on February 24, 2025
No.	Title	Lyrics	Music	Artist	Length
1.	"BloodStain"	Jayde; Lim So-young; Jo Ho-jin	Jayde; Lim So-young; Jo Ho-jin	Yezi; Yel (Fiestar)	3:03
2.	"BloodStain" (Inst.)		Jayde; Lim So-young; Jo Ho-jin		3:03
Total length:					6:06

=== Part 4 ===
Released on March 4, 2025
No.	Title	Lyrics	Music	Artist	Length
1.	"PainDrop"	Choi Jaegyu; Jeon Haejeong; Lee Gwan-hyeong	Lee Gwan-hyeong; Jeon Haejeong; Choi Jaegyu	Seoyeon, Jiwoo, Yubin and Sohyun (TripleS)	3:32
2.	"PainDrop" (Inst.)		Lee Gwan-hyeong; Jeon Haejeong; Choi Jaegyu		3:32
Total length:					7:04

== Reception ==
Before release, Friendly Rivalry garnered attention due to an effective promotional campaign and word of mouth. As soon as the first episode was released on February 10, 2025, the series took first place in number of views, number of viewers and number of new viewers among U+ Mobile TV and U+ TV original works, and continued to top the charts for three weeks. It was released simultaneously in Japan, Taiwan, Thailand and Vietnam, achieving good results: in Japan, it ranked first among Asian dramas on Hulu, and first among Korean dramas on Abema and Watcha, while in Taiwan, it ranked first on OTT Friday and second on the drama chart on IQIYI. Due to domestic viewers' requests to make the series available on more accessible platforms, it was subsequently released on TVING in March and in approximately 190 countries around the world through Rakuten Viki.

Friendly Rivalry was also popular in China, where it wasn't officially released due to the Korean Wave contents ban: it recorded over 68,000 fans on the overseas drama section of Weibo, and posts on Xiaohongshu analizing the relationships between the characters and their psychology received thousands of likes. Kim Heon-sik, a popular culture critic, listed the suspicious deaths and drug problems amidst the college entrance exam competition, and the atypical GL romance, as the reasons behind its popularity.

It received favorable reviews for the unique setting and characters, suspenseful storyline, fast-paced development, fresh and unique directing, and acting, with some considering it a turning point in Lee Hye-ri's career and her life's character. Yoo Jung-min of iMBC praised the combination between a densely composed story and sensual directing, stating that the relationships between the characters, which crossed friendship and solidarity, trust and suspicion, admiration and jealousy, left a strong impression, expecting it "to be remembered by viewers for a long time as a well-made genre piece where everything was perfect." In her review of the first four episodes, Xportsnews Jung Min-kyung stated that, although the work was intended as a "mystery girl thriller," they focused more on Woo Seul-gi's subtle emotional changes towards Yoo Jae-yi, with many elements that, to viewers, felt closer to GL; on the other hand, reporter Ha Kyung-heon of Sports Kyunghyang felt that it wasn't a queer story, but not a thriller yet. Ize commented that, unlike the original work, which focused on friendship and growth, the drama focused on fierce competition and tense narratives, highlighting the minor character of Woo Seul-gi's father and developing the story into a more three-dimensional one by strengthening the mysterious elements of medical accidents and suspicious deaths. It also noted that the characters were reborn into more realistic ones thanks to a more complex background and motivation, and praised the acting performances.

Pierce Conran of the South China Morning Post rated Friendly Rivalry 3.5 out of 5 stars, writing "The kinetic energy derived from all the emotional fireworks drives a show that is electrically staged and rhythmically edited. It should be said, however, that while the series thrives on mystery, it has a habit of running out of steam after its many reveals ... After a very strong start, Friendly Rivalry delves deeper and deeper into a mess of drugs, medical malpractice and exam cheating, but more often than not these prove to be distractions from the show's greatest assets – its characterisations and the titular relationship between its leads." According to Elle Vietnam, the series' story is both realistic and dramatic, and makes the audience ponder the price of success in a society that values achievements while also being a story about the journey of maturity, where young people are pushed into confrontation before they have time to understand the true value of life. The Midgard Times called Friendly Rivalry "a masterclass in cinematic storytelling," a disorienting and unpredictable drama "[that] thrives not on clean resolutions but on the chaos of its characters' choices," and rated it 7 out of 10.

The series' success sparked a renewed interest in the original webtoon, which rose to number one on Naver Webtoon's Top 30 Most Popular Webtoons and saw average daily sales increase twentyfold compared to the month before. The number of weekly paid transactions increased by over 470% compared to the same period before its broadcast.

=== Accolades ===
Award ceremony	Year	Category	Nominee	Result	Ref.
APAN Star Awards	2025	Best Couple	Lee Hye-ri and Chung Su-bin	Won	
Asia Artist Awards	2025	Best Actress	Lee Hye-ri	Won	
Bechdel Day	2025	Bechdel Choice 10	Friendly Rivalry	Placed	
Blue Dragon Series Awards	2025	Best Actress	Lee Hye-ri	Nominated	
Blue Dragon Series Awards	2025	Best New Actress	Chung Su-bin	Nominated	
Korea Drama Awards	2025	Best Couple	Lee Hye-ri and Chung Su-bin	Won	
SEC Awards	2026	Best LGBTQ+ Series	Friendly Rivalry	Nominated	
SEC Awards	2026	Best Actress in a Teen Series	Lee Hye-ri	Nominated	
SEC Awards	2026	Favorite Couple/Ship	Seul-gi and Jae-yi	Nominated	
