= List of Produce 48 contestants =

Produce 48 is a 2018 South Korean competition television show on Mnet in which a girl group is formed from a large pool of South Korean and Japanese idols, most of whom are represented by major idol talent agencies such as AKB48 Group. The show starts with 96 contestants, with occasional rounds of competition and voting, some of which result in elimination from the contest. Of the 96 contestants, 57 of them are from South Korean management companies, and 39 of them are from Japanese idol groups, composed of current members of AKB48 and their sister groups. The final 12 contestants, with no nationality caps, as voted only by Korean viewers, will promote as a group for two and a half years.

== Contestants ==
The spelling of names in English is according to the official website. The Korean contestants are presented in Eastern order (family name, given name), while the names of the Japanese contestants are presented in Western order (given name, family name) and also with their Japanese names. The age listed is according to the East Asian age reckoning.

Color key:

Final member of Iz*One
Contestant was eliminated in Episode 12
Contestant was eliminated in Episode 11
Contestant was eliminated in Episode 8
Contestant was eliminated in Episode 5
Contestant left the show
Contestant finished in that week's top 12

Company/Group	Name	Age	Judges evaluation		Ranking												
Company/Group	Name	Age	Judges evaluation		Ep. 1	Ep. 2	Ep. 3	Ep. 5		Ep. 8		Ep. 9	Ep. 11		Ep. 12		Final
Company/Group	Name	Age	Ep. 1	Ep. 2	#	#	#	#	Votes	#	Votes	#	#	Votes	#	Votes	#
Individual Trainee (개인연습생)	Park Seoyoung (박서영)	19	C	D	34	26	35	42	112,060	55	172,714	Eliminated					55
Individual Trainee (개인연습생)	Park Jinny (박진희)	20	C	F	52	49	61	69	52,495	Eliminated							69
8D Creative (에잇디크리에이티브)	Kang Hyewon (강혜원)	19	F	F	38	40	41	25	222,716	3	927,362	3	4	311,212	8	248,432	8
A Team	Kim Choyeon (김초연)	17	A	C	68	75	37	41	115,687	50	240,058	Eliminated					50
Banana Culture (바나나컬쳐)	Kim Nayoung (김나영)	16	C	A	55	63	58	38	139,350	21	572,848	21	21	188,617	Eliminated		21
Banana Culture (바나나컬쳐)	Kim Dahye (김다혜)^{1}	16	A	C	80	89	78	75	42,377	Eliminated							75
Blockberry Creative (블록베리 크리에이티브)	Go Yujin (고유진)	18	C	A	24	34	26	26	220,375	31	469,647	Eliminated					31
CNC	Lee Yujeong (이유정)	14	C	C	33	48	49	49	76,345	51	204,599	Eliminated					51
CNC	Yoon Eunbin (윤은빈)	14	B	B	54	68	65	65	57,364	Eliminated							65
CNC	Kim Dayeon (김다연)	15	B	B	60	65	70	70	48,458	Eliminated							70
CNC	Hong Ye-ji (홍예지)	16	B	F	76	76	80	78	39,465	Eliminated							78
CNC	Kim Yubin (김유빈)	16	B	D	90	93	93	88	34,070	Eliminated							88
Collazoo Company (콜라주컴퍼니)	Kim Hyunah (김현아)	23	B	B	67	72	64	55	67,037	46	253,880	Eliminated					46
Cube Entertainment (큐브)	Han Chowon (한초원)	16	D	B	64	79	88	47	89,134	9	765,895	13	13	243,234	13	213,259	13
Fave Entertainment (페이브)	Shin Su-hyun (신수현)^{2}	22	D	F	42	57	62	61	63,471	Eliminated							61
FENT (에프이엔티)	Kim Doah (김도아)^{13}	15	A	C	31	25	31	34	166,662	23	557,987	22	23	167,012	Eliminated		23
FNC Entertainment	Park Haeyoon (박해윤)	22	A	D	59	35	43	43	109,158	18	594,672	18	20	204,678	19	96,612	19
FNC Entertainment	Cho Ahyeong (조아영)	17	C	B	83	78	86	72	46,320	Eliminated							72
HOW	Kim Minseo (김민서)	16	C	C	62	39	47	53	69,913	44	257,679	Eliminated					44
HOW	Yu Minyoung (유민영)	18	A	B	86	32	46	51	75,698	54	191,306	Eliminated					54
HOW	Wang Ke (왕크어) / (王珂)	18	B	D	92	33	44	45	101,292	56	167,709	Eliminated					56
Million Market (밀리언마켓)	Son Eunchae (손은채)	19	C	B	95	85	53	32	175,744	32	366,555	Eliminated					32
Million Market (밀리언마켓)	Cho Sarang (조사랑)	15	B	F	89	90	91	89	34,038	Eliminated							89
MMO Entertainment	Won Seoyeon (원서연)	18	C	F	81	77	90	92	30,103	Eliminated							92
MND17	Park Minji (박민지)^{3}	19	B	B	49	56	60	54	68,130	53	193,759	Eliminated					53
MND17	Park Chanju (박찬주)	19	C	D	85	69	71	68	52,903	Eliminated							68
MND17	Lee Chaejeong (이채정)	19	C	C	96	94	92	79	38,711	Eliminated							79
MNH Entertainment	Lee Haeun (이하은)	14	A	A	51	58	33	35	164,273	48	250,748	Eliminated					48
Pledis Entertainment (플레디스)	Lee Gaeun (이가은)^{4}	24	A	A	5	1	1	1	633,511	8	808,425	5	5	307,723	14	209,252	14
Pledis Entertainment (플레디스)	Huh Yunjin (허윤진)	17	C	F	19	15	21	22	247,281	11	730,282	27	26	96,954	Eliminated		26
RBW	Na Goeun (나고은)	19	A	A	36	20	28	29	178,233	29	488,056	28	29	79,892	Eliminated		29
RBW	Park Jieun (박지은)	21	C	F	77	70	79	80	37,826	Eliminated							80
Starship Entertainment (스타쉽)	Jang Won-young (장원영)	14	B	B	3	4	4	3	539,596	1	1,010,555	8	7	277,922	1	338,366	1
Starship Entertainment (스타쉽)	An Yujin (안유진)	15	B	A	2	2	2	2	607,823	4	910,191	10	14	238,959	5	280,487	5
Starship Entertainment (스타쉽)	Cho Kahyeon (조가현)	15	B	B	65	36	38	48	89,074	57	137,680	Eliminated					57
Stone Music Entertainment (스톤뮤직)	Jo Yuri (조유리)^{5}	17	A	F	10	19	18	19	289,180	10	747,120	16	18	213,237	3	294,734	3
Stone Music Entertainment (스톤뮤직)	Jang Gyuri (장규리)^{5}	21	B	F	6	14	14	17	296,913	26	525,854	25	25	129,098	Eliminated		25
Stone Music Entertainment (스톤뮤직)	Lee Sian (이시안)^{5}	19	C	D	8	18	27	23	235,777	19	589,732	30	30	75,969	Eliminated		30
Stone Music Entertainment (스톤뮤직)	Bae Eunyeong (배은영)^{5}	21	C	B	18	30	34	37	149,092	36	334,027	Eliminated					36
Music Works (뮤직웍스)	Yoon Haesol (윤해솔)	21	B	D	40	50	55	52	73,457	35	343,299	Eliminated					35
Music Works (뮤직웍스)	Choi Soeun (최소은)	17	B	C	86	92	89	90	31,436	Eliminated							90
Urban Works Media (얼반웍스미디어)	Kim Minju (김민주)	17	D	C	13	17	19	15	307,334	6	860,341	20	15	227,786	11	227,061	11
Wellmade Yedang (웰메이드예당)	Hwang Soyeon (황소연)	18	A	A	90	46	51	60	63,482	Eliminated							60
Wellmade Yedang (웰메이드예당)	Kang Damin (강다민)	14	B	A	70	74	75	62	60,709	Eliminated							62
WM Entertainment	Lee Chaeyeon (이채연)^{6}	18	A	A	29	10	10	10	368,218	17	597,256	12	3	327,445	12	221,273	12
WM Entertainment	Lee Seunghyeon (이승현)	17	B	C	66	60	68	73	45,759	Eliminated							73
WM Entertainment	Cho Yeongin (조영인)	17	B	C	74	62	74	84	36,672	Eliminated							84
Woollim Entertainment (울림)	Kwon Eunbi (권은비)^{7}	23	A	C	25	3	5	5	507,633	5	906,981	11	12	247,556	7	250,212	7
Woollim Entertainment (울림)	Kim Chaewon (김채원)	18	B	B	21	21	30	28	179,387	15	602,360	15	19	210,781	10	238,192	10
Woollim Entertainment (울림)	Kim Sohee (김소희)	15	C	B	48	44	48	50	75,898	43	269,233	Eliminated					43
Woollim Entertainment (울림)	Kim Suyun (김수윤)	17	C	C	58	51	54	57	66,438	47	251,208	Eliminated					47
YGKPlus (YG케이플러스)	Choi Yeonsoo (최연수)	19	D	F	47	52	57	66	56,200	Eliminated							66
YGKPlus (YG케이플러스)	Ahn Yewon (안예원)	17	F	F	82	88	84	86	35,795	Eliminated							86
Yuehua Entertainment (위에화)	Choi Yena (최예나)	19	A	B	7	6	7	9	390,483	16	601,295	19	16	215,828	4	285,385	4
Yuehua Entertainment (위에화)	Kim Sihyeon (김시현)^{3}	19	B	A	15	13	17	20	262,648	24	549,741	29	27	96,036	Eliminated		27
Yuehua Entertainment (위에화)	Wang Yiren (왕이런) / (王怡人)	18	B	C	11	7	9	8	404,888	14	643,901	26	28	94,304	Eliminated		28
ZB Label (지비레이블)	Alex Christine (알렉스 크리스틴)^{8}	22	B	C	88	86	85	82	37,536	Eliminated							82
AKB48	Hitomi Honda (本田仁美) / (혼다 히토미)	17	C	A	30	47	22	12	333,670	12	716,204	9	11	250,011	9	240,418	9
AKB48	Miho Miyazaki (宮崎美穂) / (미야자키 미호)	25	D	D	17	16	15	21	256,613	27	504,339	1	2	347,998	15	184,765	15
AKB48	Juri Takahashi (高橋朱里) / (타카하시 쥬리)	21	B	A	20	29	20	18	289,547	20	579,050	17	17	213,508	16	164,285	16
AKB48	Miyu Takeuchi (竹内美宥) / (타케우치 미유)	22	A	B	39	11	8	11	362,417	30	487,842	4	6	303,379	17	158,052	17
AKB48	Miu Shitao (下尾みう) / (시타오 미우)	17	D	D	41	45	39	36	160,881	22	562,216	6	10	261,023	18	129,113	18
AKB48	Moe Goto (後藤萌咲) / (고토 모에)	17	F	C	16	8	6	6	461,078	28	491,582	24	24	153,955	Eliminated		24
AKB48	Erii Chiba (千葉恵里) / (치바 에리이)	15	F	F	27	38	23	24	228,389	33	359,859	Eliminated					33
AKB48	Mako Kojima (小嶋真子) / (코지마 마코)	21	C	B	12	23	25	31	177,040	34	353,790	Eliminated					34
AKB48	Chiyori Nakanishi (中西智代梨) / (나카니시 치요리)	23	D	C	22	37	40	39	127,714	37	308,280	Eliminated					37
AKB48	Tomu Muto (武藤十夢) / (무토 토무)	24	D	D	23	28	32	33	175,038	38	299,255	Eliminated					38
AKB48	Minami Sato (佐藤美波) / (사토 미나미)	15	D	F	57	66	59	58	64,511	39	293,650	Eliminated					39
AKB48	Saho Iwatate (岩立沙穂) / (이와타테 사호)	24	B	D	46	24	24	27	189,308	40	288,890	Eliminated					40
AKB48	Nanami Asai (浅井七海) / (아사이 나나미)	18	F	D	26	41	42	46	96,530	42	269,995	Eliminated					42
AKB48	Ikumi Nakano (中野郁海) / (나카노 이쿠미)	18	D	B	43	53	50	59	64,172	Eliminated							59
AKB48	Shinobu Mogi (茂木忍) / (모기 시노부)	21	F	D	44	59	55	63	57,697	Eliminated							63
AKB48	Erina Oda (小田えりな) / (오다 에리나)	21	C	F	56	67	69	64	57,612	Eliminated							64
AKB48	Serika Nagano (永野芹佳) / (나가노 세리카)	17	F	F	72	81	76	77	40,131	Eliminated							77
AKB48	Manami Ichikawa (市川愛美) / (이치카와 마나미)	19	F	C	79	83	87	81	37,685	Eliminated							81
AKB48	Ayana Shinozaki (篠崎彩奈) / (시노자키 아야나)	22	F	F	84	87	77	91	30,489	Eliminated							91
HKT48	Sakura Miyawaki (宮脇咲良) / (미야와키 사쿠라)	20	A	A	1	5	3	4	532,273	7	824,058	2	1	373,783	2	316,105	2
HKT48	Nako Yabuki (矢吹奈子) / (야부키 나코)	17	F	A	14	27	16	7	449,722	2	947,642	7	9	264,209	6	261,788	6
HKT48	Bibian Murakawa (村川緋杏) / (무라카와 비비안)	19	F	F	28	31	29	30	178,024	45	255,391	Eliminated					45
HKT48	Misaki Aramaki (荒巻美咲) / (아라마키 미사키)	17	F	F	50	61	66	56	66,659	49	240,798	Eliminated					49
HKT48	Aoi Motomura (本村碧唯) / (모토무라 아오이)	21	D	B	37	42	36	44	103,611	52	201,013	Eliminated					52
HKT48	Natsumi Matsuoka (松岡菜摘) / (마츠오카 나츠미)	22	F	C	35	55	52	67	54,450	Eliminated							67
HKT48	Mina Imada (今田美奈) / (이마다 미나)	21	D	C	53	64	67	76	40,155	Eliminated							76
HKT48	Sae Kurihara (栗原紗英) / (쿠리하라 사에)	22	F	D	73	84	81	83	37,330	Eliminated							83
HKT48	Miku Tanaka (田中美久) / (타나카 미쿠)^{10}	17	F	C	63	71	72	Left the Show									93
HKT48	Amane Tsukiashi (月足天音) / (츠키아시 아마네)^{10}	19	F	F	78	91	Left the Show										94
NGT48	Noe Yamada (山田野絵) / (야마다 노에)	19	C	F	45	9	11	14	314,400	41	270,992	Eliminated					41
NGT48	Rena Hasegawa (長谷川玲奈) / (하세가와 레나)	17	D	F	61	54	63	71	47,766	Eliminated							71
NMB48	Miru Shiroma (白間美瑠) / (시로마 미루)	21	B	D	9	22	13	16	297,902	13	657,285	14	8	268,609	20	94,386	20
NMB48	Sae Murase (村瀬紗英) / (무라세 사에)	21	D	C	32	43	45	40	120,865	25	546,533	23	22	174,576	Eliminated		22
NMB48	Yuuka Kato (加藤夕夏) / (카토 유우카)	21	C	B	71	73	73	74	43,570	Eliminated							74
NMB48	Kokoro Naiki (内木志) / (나이키 코코로)	21	D	C	75	82	82	87	34,463	Eliminated							87
NMB48	Cocona Umeyama (梅山恋和) / (우메야마 코코나)^{9}	15	F		94	95	Left the Show										95
NMB48	Azusa Uemura (植村梓) / (우에무라 아즈사)^{9}	19	F		93	96	Left the Show										96
SKE48	Jurina Matsui (松井珠理奈) / (마츠이 쥬리나)^{11}	21	B	B	4	12	12	13	329,455	58	127,714	Eliminated					58
SKE48	Yuka Asai (浅井裕華) / (아사이 유우카)	15	F	D	69	80	83	85	35,929	Eliminated							85

== Group Battle Performances (Episode 3–4) ==
Color key

- Winning team
- Leader
- Center
- Leader and center

Bold denotes the person who picked the team members. Sakura Miyawaki chose her team first, and 14 other captains were randomly selected to choose their members afterwards. Team "SNACK" was made up of contestants who were left over and not picked.

Performance			Team		Contestant			
#	Original artist(s)	Song	Name	Votes (Average)	Position	Name	Votes	Bonus
1	GFriend	"Love Whisper"	칠전팔기 (Never Give Up!)	334	Main vocal	Wang Ke	28	
1	GFriend	"Love Whisper"	칠전팔기 (Never Give Up!)	334	Sub vocal 1	**Tomu Muto**	52	
1	GFriend	"Love Whisper"	칠전팔기 (Never Give Up!)	334	Sub vocal 2	Son Eunchae	88	
1	GFriend	"Love Whisper"	칠전팔기 (Never Give Up!)	334	Sub vocal 3	Serika Nagano	22	
1	GFriend	"Love Whisper"	칠전팔기 (Never Give Up!)	334	Sub vocal 4	Noe Yamada	106	
1	GFriend	"Love Whisper"	칠전팔기 (Never Give Up!)	334	Sub vocal 5	Manami Ichikawa	38	
1	GFriend	"Love Whisper"	자이언트 베이비 (Giant Baby)	488	Main vocal	**Nako Yabuki**	330	+1000
1	GFriend	"Love Whisper"	자이언트 베이비 (Giant Baby)	488	Sub vocal 1	Yoon Eunbin	42	+1000
1	GFriend	"Love Whisper"	자이언트 베이비 (Giant Baby)	488	Sub vocal 2	Kim Nayoung	32	+1000
1	GFriend	"Love Whisper"	자이언트 베이비 (Giant Baby)	488	Sub vocal 3	Misaki Aramaki	30	+1000
1	GFriend	"Love Whisper"	자이언트 베이비 (Giant Baby)	488	Sub vocal 4	Sae Kurihara	18	+1000
1	GFriend	"Love Whisper"	자이언트 베이비 (Giant Baby)	488	Sub vocal 5	Kang Damin	36	+1000
2	Red Velvet	"Peek-a-Boo"	피카chu (pikachu)	348	Main vocal	Jang Gyuri	78	
2	Red Velvet	"Peek-a-Boo"	피카chu (pikachu)	348	Sub vocal 1	Alex Christine	4	
2	Red Velvet	"Peek-a-Boo"	피카chu (pikachu)	348	Sub vocal 2	Lee Gaeun	74	
2	Red Velvet	"Peek-a-Boo"	피카chu (pikachu)	348	Sub vocal 3	Bae Eunyeong	28	
2	Red Velvet	"Peek-a-Boo"	피카chu (pikachu)	348	Sub vocal 4	**Jurina Matsui**	110	
2	Red Velvet	"Peek-a-Boo"	피카chu (pikachu)	348	Sub vocal 5	Wang Yiren	54	
2	Red Velvet	"Peek-a-Boo"	흐흥이 난 여우 (Kiss Blowers)	474	Main vocal	Hong Yeji	92	+1000
2	Red Velvet	"Peek-a-Boo"	흐흥이 난 여우 (Kiss Blowers)	474	Sub vocal 1	Kim Dahye	26	+1000
2	Red Velvet	"Peek-a-Boo"	흐흥이 난 여우 (Kiss Blowers)	474	Sub vocal 2	Lee Yujeong	98	+1000
2	Red Velvet	"Peek-a-Boo"	흐흥이 난 여우 (Kiss Blowers)	474	Sub vocal 3	Miu Shitao	116	+1000
2	Red Velvet	"Peek-a-Boo"	흐흥이 난 여우 (Kiss Blowers)	474	Sub vocal 4	Yuuka Kato	102	+1000
2	Red Velvet	"Peek-a-Boo"	흐흥이 난 여우 (Kiss Blowers)	474	Sub vocal 5	**Kim Yubin**	40	+1000
3	AOA	"Short Hair"	빼꼼빼꼼 (Sneak a Peak)	442 (73.7)	Main vocal	Jo Yuri	152	+1000
3	AOA	"Short Hair"	빼꼼빼꼼 (Sneak a Peak)	442 (73.7)	Sub vocal 1	Juri Takahashi	52	+1000
3	AOA	"Short Hair"	빼꼼빼꼼 (Sneak a Peak)	442 (73.7)	Sub vocal 2	Kim Sihyeon	64	+1000
3	AOA	"Short Hair"	빼꼼빼꼼 (Sneak a Peak)	442 (73.7)	Sub vocal 3	**Mako Kojima**	120	+1000
3	AOA	"Short Hair"	빼꼼빼꼼 (Sneak a Peak)	442 (73.7)	Rapper 1	Yu Minyoung	28	+1000
3	AOA	"Short Hair"	빼꼼빼꼼 (Sneak a Peak)	442 (73.7)	Rapper 2	Kim Minseo	26	+1000
3	AOA	"Short Hair"	하이클래스 (High Class)	340 (68)	Main vocal	Lee Sian	148	
3	AOA	"Short Hair"	하이클래스 (High Class)	340 (68)	Sub vocal 2	Rena Hasegawa	50	
3	AOA	"Short Hair"	하이클래스 (High Class)	340 (68)	Sub vocal 3	**Natsumi Matsuoka**	90	
3	AOA	"Short Hair"	하이클래스 (High Class)	340 (68)	Rapper 1	Ahn Yewon	16	
3	AOA	"Short Hair"	하이클래스 (High Class)	340 (68)	Rapper 2	Mina Imada	36	
4	Kara	"Mamma Mia!"	아이섀도우 (Eyeshadow)	422 (84.4)	Main vocal	Park Minji	66	+1000
4	Kara	"Mamma Mia!"	아이섀도우 (Eyeshadow)	422 (84.4)	Sub vocal 1	**Park Jieun**	32	+1000
4	Kara	"Mamma Mia!"	아이섀도우 (Eyeshadow)	422 (84.4)	Sub vocal 2	Chiyori Nakanishi	48	+1000
4	Kara	"Mamma Mia!"	아이섀도우 (Eyeshadow)	422 (84.4)	Sub vocal 3	Sae Murase	138	+1000
4	Kara	"Mamma Mia!"	아이섀도우 (Eyeshadow)	422 (84.4)	Sub vocal 4	Kim Hyunah	138	+1000
4	Kara	"Mamma Mia!"	(오마이갓) 어떡하조? ((OMG) What to do?)	368 (61.3)	Main vocal	Cho Sarang	18	
4	Kara	"Mamma Mia!"	(오마이갓) 어떡하조? ((OMG) What to do?)	368 (61.3)	Sub vocal 1	Shin Suhyun	88	
4	Kara	"Mamma Mia!"	(오마이갓) 어떡하조? ((OMG) What to do?)	368 (61.3)	Sub vocal 2	Miho Miyazaki	92	
4	Kara	"Mamma Mia!"	(오마이갓) 어떡하조? ((OMG) What to do?)	368 (61.3)	Sub vocal 3	**Bibian Murakawa**	86	
4	Kara	"Mamma Mia!"	(오마이갓) 어떡하조? ((OMG) What to do?)	368 (61.3)	Sub vocal 4	Ayana Shinozaki	28	
4	Kara	"Mamma Mia!"	(오마이갓) 어떡하조? ((OMG) What to do?)	368 (61.3)	Sub vocal 5	Choi Soeun	56	
5	AKB48	"High Tension"	파워레인보 (Power Rainbow)	278 (46.3)	Main vocal	Yoon Haesol	40	
5	AKB48	"High Tension"	파워레인보 (Power Rainbow)	278 (46.3)	Sub vocal 1	Kim Dayeon	46	
5	AKB48	"High Tension"	파워레인보 (Power Rainbow)	278 (46.3)	Sub vocal 2	**Saho Iwatate**	56	
5	AKB48	"High Tension"	파워레인보 (Power Rainbow)	278 (46.3)	Sub vocal 3	Cho Yeongin	28	
5	AKB48	"High Tension"	파워레인보 (Power Rainbow)	278 (46.3)	Rapper 1	Shinobu Mogi	58	
5	AKB48	"High Tension"	파워레인보 (Power Rainbow)	278 (46.3)	Rapper 2	Ikumi Nakano	50	
5	AKB48	"High Tension"	텐션업걸즈 (Tension-up Girls)	504 (101.2)^{12}	Main vocal	Miyu Takeuchi	84	+1000
5	AKB48	"High Tension"	텐션업걸즈 (Tension-up Girls)	504 (101.2)^{12}	Sub vocal 1	**Erina Oda**	60	+1000
5	AKB48	"High Tension"	텐션업걸즈 (Tension-up Girls)	504 (101.2)^{12}	Sub vocal 2	Huh Yunjin	188	+1000
5	AKB48	"High Tension"	텐션업걸즈 (Tension-up Girls)	504 (101.2)^{12}	Rapper 1	Cho Ahyeong	160	+1000
5	AKB48	"High Tension"	텐션업걸즈 (Tension-up Girls)	504 (101.2)^{12}	Rapper 2	Kim Suyun	12	+1000
6	Blackpink	"Boombayah"	BLACK WORLD	326 (65.2)	Main rapper	**Lee Chaejeong**	54	
6	Blackpink	"Boombayah"	BLACK WORLD	326 (65.2)	Sub rapper 1	Go Yujin	198	
6	Blackpink	"Boombayah"	BLACK WORLD	326 (65.2)	Sub rapper 2	Park Chanju	22	
6	Blackpink	"Boombayah"	BLACK WORLD	326 (65.2)	Vocal 1	Won Seoyeon	22	
6	Blackpink	"Boombayah"	BLACK WORLD	326 (65.2)	Vocal 2	Kim Sohee	30	
6	Blackpink	"Boombayah"	SNACK	448 (74.7)	Main rapper	Kang Hyewon	44	+1000
6	Blackpink	"Boombayah"	SNACK	448 (74.7)	Sub rapper 1	Erii Chiba	102	+1000
6	Blackpink	"Boombayah"	SNACK	448 (74.7)	Sub rapper 2	Minami Sato	86	+1000
6	Blackpink	"Boombayah"	SNACK	448 (74.7)	Vocal 1	Han Chowon	42	+1000
6	Blackpink	"Boombayah"	SNACK	448 (74.7)	Vocal 2	Nanami Asai	144	+1000
6	Blackpink	"Boombayah"	SNACK	448 (74.7)	Vocal 3	Yuka Asai	30	+1000
7	Twice	"Like Ooh-Ahh (Japanese version)"	푱 (Pop)	442	Main vocal	Park Haeyoon	50	+1000
7	Twice	"Like Ooh-Ahh (Japanese version)"	푱 (Pop)	442	Sub vocal 1	Kim Chaewon	104	+1000
7	Twice	"Like Ooh-Ahh (Japanese version)"	푱 (Pop)	442	Sub vocal 2	Moe Goto	172	+1000
7	Twice	"Like Ooh-Ahh (Japanese version)"	푱 (Pop)	442	Sub vocal 3	Lee Seunghyeon	26	+1000
7	Twice	"Like Ooh-Ahh (Japanese version)"	푱 (Pop)	442	Rapper 1	**Hwang Soyeon**	10	+1000
7	Twice	"Like Ooh-Ahh (Japanese version)"	푱 (Pop)	442	Rapper 2	Kim Doah	80	+1000
7	Twice	"Like Ooh-Ahh (Japanese version)"	너꺼야♡ (NeoKkeoYa♡)	342	Main vocal	Lee Haeun	86	
7	Twice	"Like Ooh-Ahh (Japanese version)"	너꺼야♡ (NeoKkeoYa♡)	342	Sub vocal 1	Cho Kahyeon	14	
7	Twice	"Like Ooh-Ahh (Japanese version)"	너꺼야♡ (NeoKkeoYa♡)	342	Sub vocal 2	**Kokoro Naiki**	86	
7	Twice	"Like Ooh-Ahh (Japanese version)"	너꺼야♡ (NeoKkeoYa♡)	342	Sub vocal 3	Park Seoyoung	72	
7	Twice	"Like Ooh-Ahh (Japanese version)"	너꺼야♡ (NeoKkeoYa♡)	342	Rapper 1	Park Jinny	38	
7	Twice	"Like Ooh-Ahh (Japanese version)"	너꺼야♡ (NeoKkeoYa♡)	342	Rapper 2	Choi Yeonsoo	46	
8	I.O.I	"Very Very Very"	믹스주스 (MixJuice)	440	Main vocal	Choi Yena	64	+1000
8	I.O.I	"Very Very Very"	믹스주스 (MixJuice)	440	Sub vocal 1	Na Goeun	42	+1000
8	I.O.I	"Very Very Very"	믹스주스 (MixJuice)	440	Sub vocal 2	Miru Shiroma	112	+1000
8	I.O.I	"Very Very Very"	믹스주스 (MixJuice)	440	Sub vocal 3	Hitomi Honda	70	+1000
8	I.O.I	"Very Very Very"	믹스주스 (MixJuice)	440	Rapper 1	**An Yujin**	62	+1000
8	I.O.I	"Very Very Very"	믹스주스 (MixJuice)	440	Rapper 2	Jang Won-young	90	+1000
8	I.O.I	"Very Very Very"	베리베리 라즈베리 (BerryBerry Raspberry)	356	Main vocal	Lee Chaeyeon	34	
8	I.O.I	"Very Very Very"	베리베리 라즈베리 (BerryBerry Raspberry)	356	Sub vocal 1	Kwon Eunbi	24	
8	I.O.I	"Very Very Very"	베리베리 라즈베리 (BerryBerry Raspberry)	356	Sub vocal 2	**Sakura Miyawaki**	164	
8	I.O.I	"Very Very Very"	베리베리 라즈베리 (BerryBerry Raspberry)	356	Sub vocal 3	Aoi Motomura	46	
8	I.O.I	"Very Very Very"	베리베리 라즈베리 (BerryBerry Raspberry)	356	Rapper 1	Kim Minju	34	
8	I.O.I	"Very Very Very"	베리베리 라즈베리 (BerryBerry Raspberry)	356	Rapper 2	Kim Choyeon	54	

== Position Evaluation Performances (Episode 6–7) ==
Each contestant chose to perform in either the Vocal/Rap or Dance position on a particular song, starting with Noe Yamada, who ranked #14 in the previous episode. The top 12 from the previous episode were then allowed to choose a filled group and replace the lowest-ranking contestant, forcing them to choose a mystery song for either Vocal/Rap (BoA's "Merry Chri") or Dance (Jax Jones's "Instruction"). The top contestant for each song received a 5,000 vote bonus, while the top contestant among all Vocal/Rap songs and the top contestant among all Dance songs received a 100,000 vote bonus. For the Vocal/Rap position, final rankings of only several girls were shown. Also, the number of votes received by "Merry Chri" team members was not posted.

Color key

- Winner for each song
- Leader
- Center
- Leader and center

Performance				Name	Results		
Position	#	Artist	Song	Name	Votes	Rank	Bonus
Vocal & Rap	1	Wanna One	"Energetic"	Jo Yuri	511	1	+5000
Vocal & Rap	1	Wanna One	"Energetic"	Kim Sihyeon	376	3	
Vocal & Rap	1	Wanna One	"Energetic"	Na Goeun	382	2	
Vocal & Rap	1	Wanna One	"Energetic"	Nanami Asai	273	5	
Vocal & Rap	1	Wanna One	"Energetic"	Noe Yamada	356	4	
Vocal & Rap	2	Heize	"Don't Know You"	Park Minji	360	4	
Vocal & Rap	2	Heize	"Don't Know You"	Han Chowon	585	1	+5000, +100,000
Vocal & Rap	2	Heize	"Don't Know You"	Kang Hyewon	400	3	
Vocal & Rap	2	Heize	"Don't Know You"	Yu Minyoung	499	2	
Vocal & Rap	4	BoA	"Merry Chri" (Japanese version)	Park Haeyoon	543	1	+5000
Vocal & Rap	4	BoA	"Merry Chri" (Japanese version)	Kim Nayoung	-	3	
Vocal & Rap	4	BoA	"Merry Chri" (Japanese version)	Kim Sohee	-	6	
Vocal & Rap	4	BoA	"Merry Chri" (Japanese version)	Yoon Haesol	-	2	
Vocal & Rap	4	BoA	"Merry Chri" (Japanese version)	Misaki Aramaki	-	4	
Vocal & Rap	4	BoA	"Merry Chri" (Japanese version)	Minami Sato	-	5	
Vocal & Rap	6	Girls' Generation	"Into the New World" (Ballad Version)	Huh Yunjin	537	2	
Vocal & Rap	6	Girls' Generation	"Into the New World" (Ballad Version)	Moe Goto	293	4	
Vocal & Rap	6	Girls' Generation	"Into the New World" (Ballad Version)	Nako Yabuki	511	3	
Vocal & Rap	6	Girls' Generation	"Into the New World" (Ballad Version)	Erii Chiba	287	5	
Vocal & Rap	6	Girls' Generation	"Into the New World" (Ballad Version)	Kim Chaewon	550	1	+5000
Vocal & Rap	8	BTS	"The Truth Untold"	Jang Gyuri	298	2	
Vocal & Rap	8	BTS	"The Truth Untold"	Miyu Takeuchi	289	4	
Vocal & Rap	8	BTS	"The Truth Untold"	Miho Miyazaki	559	1	+5000
Vocal & Rap	8	BTS	"The Truth Untold"	Saho Iwatate	294	3	
Vocal & Rap	11	Blackpink	"Ddu-Du Ddu-Du"	Kim Doah	488	1	+5000
Vocal & Rap	11	Blackpink	"Ddu-Du Ddu-Du"	Park Seoyoung	352	4	
Vocal & Rap	11	Blackpink	"Ddu-Du Ddu-Du"	Sakura Miyawaki	384	3	
Vocal & Rap	11	Blackpink	"Ddu-Du Ddu-Du"	Juri Takahashi	432	2	
Vocal & Rap	11	Blackpink	"Ddu-Du Ddu-Du"	Bibian Murakawa	311	5	
Vocal & Rap	11	Blackpink	"Ddu-Du Ddu-Du"	Cho Kahyeon	176	6	
Dance	3	Ariana Grande	"Side to Side"	Lee Sian	358	5	
Dance	3	Ariana Grande	"Side to Side"	Lee Gaeun	411	3	
Dance	3	Ariana Grande	"Side to Side"	Jang Won-young	446	2	
Dance	3	Ariana Grande	"Side to Side"	Wang Yiren	391	4	
Dance	3	Ariana Grande	"Side to Side"	Miru Shiroma	469	1	+5000
Dance	5	Demi Lovato	"Sorry Not Sorry (Freedo Remix)"	Kwon Eunbi	450	1	+5000
Dance	5	Demi Lovato	"Sorry Not Sorry (Freedo Remix)"	An Yujin	403	2	
Dance	5	Demi Lovato	"Sorry Not Sorry (Freedo Remix)"	Choi Yena	364	4	
Dance	5	Demi Lovato	"Sorry Not Sorry (Freedo Remix)"	Lee Chaeyeon	397	3	
Dance	5	Demi Lovato	"Sorry Not Sorry (Freedo Remix)"	Ko Yujin	337	5	
Dance	7	Fitz and the Tantrums	"HandClap"	Aoi Motomura	312	6	
Dance	7	Fitz and the Tantrums	"HandClap"	Mako Kojima	442	3	
Dance	7	Fitz and the Tantrums	"HandClap"	Tomu Muto	313	5	
Dance	7	Fitz and the Tantrums	"HandClap"	Sae Murase	477	1	+5000, +100,000
Dance	7	Fitz and the Tantrums	"HandClap"	Kim Choyeon	446	2	
Dance	7	Fitz and the Tantrums	"HandClap"	Kim Minseo	387	4	
Dance	9	Jax Jones	"Instruction"	Son Eunchae	438	1	+5000
Dance	9	Jax Jones	"Instruction"	Lee Haeun	287	6	
Dance	9	Jax Jones	"Instruction"	Chiyori Nakanishi	358	3	
Dance	9	Jax Jones	"Instruction"	Wang Ke	313	5	
Dance	9	Jax Jones	"Instruction"	Kim Hyunah	382	2	
Dance	9	Jax Jones	"Instruction"	Kim Suyun	335	4	
Dance	10	Little Mix	"Touch (Muffin Remix)"	Miu Shitao	369	3	
Dance	10	Little Mix	"Touch (Muffin Remix)"	Hitomi Honda	395	2	
Dance	10	Little Mix	"Touch (Muffin Remix)"	Kim Minju	423	1	+5000
Dance	10	Little Mix	"Touch (Muffin Remix)"	Bae Eunyeong	329	4	
Dance	10	Little Mix	"Touch (Muffin Remix)"	Lee Yujeong	304	5	

== Concept Evaluation (Episode 9–10) ==
The Concept Evaluation votes came from the studio audience. The winning team was the group that performed "Rollin' Rollin'"; they received a bonus of 20,000 votes each, with the top vote getter within the team, Miru Shiroma, receiving 50,000 votes.

Color key

- Winner
- Leader
- Center

Performance					Contestant				
#	Concept	Producer	Song	Votes	Position	Name	Votes	Rank	Bonus
1	Contemporary Girls Pop	oReO	"1000%"	138	Main vocal	Lee Chaeyeon	18	24	
1	Contemporary Girls Pop	oReO	"1000%"	138	Sub vocal 1	Miho Miyazaki	42	13	
1	Contemporary Girls Pop	oReO	"1000%"	138	Sub vocal 2	Moe Goto	28	19	
1	Contemporary Girls Pop	oReO	"1000%"	138	Sub vocal 3	Kim Minju	10	28	
1	Contemporary Girls Pop	oReO	"1000%"	138	Sub vocal 4	Miu Shitao	37	15	
2	New Jack Swing	Masked Rider (Kamen Rider)	"To Reach You" (너에게 닿기를)	242	Main vocal	Na Goeun	27	20	
2	New Jack Swing	Masked Rider (Kamen Rider)	"To Reach You" (너에게 닿기를)	242	Sub vocal 1	Nako Yabuki	76	3	
2	New Jack Swing	Masked Rider (Kamen Rider)	"To Reach You" (너에게 닿기를)	242	Sub vocal 2	Jo Yuri	59	6	
2	New Jack Swing	Masked Rider (Kamen Rider)	"To Reach You" (너에게 닿기를)	242	Sub vocal 3	Jang Gyuri	16	26	
2	New Jack Swing	Masked Rider (Kamen Rider)	"To Reach You" (너에게 닿기를)	242	Sub vocal 4	Kim Chaewon	63	5	
3	Hip Hop / R&B Pop	Full8loom	"I Am"	89	Main vocal	Huh Yunjin	9	30	
3	Hip Hop / R&B Pop	Full8loom	"I Am"	89	Sub vocal 1	Choi Yena	26	21	
3	Hip Hop / R&B Pop	Full8loom	"I Am"	89	Sub vocal 2	An Yujin	22	23	
3	Hip Hop / R&B Pop	Full8loom	"I Am"	89	Rapper 1	Lee Gaeun	17	25	
3	Hip Hop / R&B Pop	Full8loom	"I Am"	89	Rapper 2	Juri Takahashi	15	27	
4	Tropical Pop Dance	WonderKid & Shin Kung	"Rollin' Rollin'"	266	Main vocal	Kim Nayoung	36	16	+20,000
4	Tropical Pop Dance	WonderKid & Shin Kung	"Rollin' Rollin'"	266	Sub vocal 1	Hitomi Honda	50	10	+20,000
4	Tropical Pop Dance	WonderKid & Shin Kung	"Rollin' Rollin'"	266	Sub vocal 2	Miru Shiroma	79	2	+50,000
4	Tropical Pop Dance	WonderKid & Shin Kung	"Rollin' Rollin'"	266	Sub vocal 3	Jang Won-young	53	9	+20,000
4	Tropical Pop Dance	WonderKid & Shin Kung	"Rollin' Rollin'"	266	Rapper	Kim Doah	46	11	+20,000
5	Moombahton / Trap	EDEN	"Rumor"	241	Main vocal	Kwon Eunbi	65	4	
5	Moombahton / Trap	EDEN	"Rumor"	241	Sub vocal 1	Lee Sian	44	12	
5	Moombahton / Trap	EDEN	"Rumor"	241	Sub vocal 2	Sae Murase	56	7	
5	Moombahton / Trap	EDEN	"Rumor"	241	Rapper 1	Han Chowon	41	14	
5	Moombahton / Trap	EDEN	"Rumor"	241	Rapper 2	Kim Sihyeon	35	17	
6	Pop Dance	Lee Daehwi	"See You Again" (다시 만나)	222	Main vocal	Park Haeyoon	55	8	
6	Pop Dance	Lee Daehwi	"See You Again" (다시 만나)	222	Sub vocal 1	Miyu Takeuchi	35	17	
6	Pop Dance	Lee Daehwi	"See You Again" (다시 만나)	222	Sub vocal 2	Wang Yiren	10	28	
6	Pop Dance	Lee Daehwi	"See You Again" (다시 만나)	222	Sub vocal 3	Kang Hyewon	23	22	
6	Pop Dance	Lee Daehwi	"See You Again" (다시 만나)	222	Sub vocal 4	Sakura Miyawaki	99	1	

== Debut Evaluation Performances (Episode 12) ==
Color key

- Leader
- Center
- Leader and center

Performance			Contestant	
#	Producer	Song	Position	Name
1	Yasushi Akimoto	"Suki ni Nacchau Darō? (반해버리잖아? / 好きになっちゃうだろう？)"	Main vocal	Kwon Eunbi
1	Yasushi Akimoto	"Suki ni Nacchau Darō? (반해버리잖아? / 好きになっちゃうだろう？)"	Sub vocal 1	Choi Yena
1	Yasushi Akimoto	"Suki ni Nacchau Darō? (반해버리잖아? / 好きになっちゃうだろう？)"	Sub vocal 2	Sakura Miyawaki
1	Yasushi Akimoto	"Suki ni Nacchau Darō? (반해버리잖아? / 好きになっちゃうだろう？)"	Sub vocal 3	Lee Gaeun
1	Yasushi Akimoto	"Suki ni Nacchau Darō? (반해버리잖아? / 好きになっちゃうだろう？)"	Sub vocal 4	Miru Shiroma
1	Yasushi Akimoto	"Suki ni Nacchau Darō? (반해버리잖아? / 好きになっちゃうだろう？)"	Sub vocal 5	Kang Hyewon
1	Yasushi Akimoto	"Suki ni Nacchau Darō? (반해버리잖아? / 好きになっちゃうだろう？)"	Sub vocal 6	Kim Chaewon
1	Yasushi Akimoto	"Suki ni Nacchau Darō? (반해버리잖아? / 好きになっちゃうだろう？)"	Sub vocal 7	Miu Shitao
1	Yasushi Akimoto	"Suki ni Nacchau Darō? (반해버리잖아? / 好きになっちゃうだろう？)"	Sub vocal 8	Juri Takahashi
1	Yasushi Akimoto	"Suki ni Nacchau Darō? (반해버리잖아? / 好きになっちゃうだろう？)"	Sub vocal 9	Han Chowon
2	Han Sung-soo	"앞으로 잘 부탁해 (We Together)"	Main vocal	Miyu Takeuchi
2	Han Sung-soo	"앞으로 잘 부탁해 (We Together)"	Sub vocal 1	Hitomi Honda
2	Han Sung-soo	"앞으로 잘 부탁해 (We Together)"	Sub vocal 2	Miho Miyazaki
2	Han Sung-soo	"앞으로 잘 부탁해 (We Together)"	Sub vocal 3	Jo Yuri
2	Han Sung-soo	"앞으로 잘 부탁해 (We Together)"	Sub vocal 4	Jang Won-young
2	Han Sung-soo	"앞으로 잘 부탁해 (We Together)"	Sub vocal 5	An Yujin
2	Han Sung-soo	"앞으로 잘 부탁해 (We Together)"	Sub vocal 6	Kim Minju
2	Han Sung-soo	"앞으로 잘 부탁해 (We Together)"	Sub vocal 7	Park Haeyoon
2	Han Sung-soo	"앞으로 잘 부탁해 (We Together)"	Sub vocal 8	Nako Yabuki
2	Han Sung-soo	"앞으로 잘 부탁해 (We Together)"	Sub vocal 9	Lee Chaeyeon

== Notes ==
- ^{1}Kim Da-Hye is of Korean and Japanese descent. Her Japanese name (Cocoa Shimazu (しまづ ここあ)) is now shown on her name tag.
- ^{2}Shin Su-hyun was a contestant on the survival show Mix Nine.
- ^{3}MND17 trainee Park Min-ji and Yuehua Entertainment trainee Kim Si-hyeon were contestants on the first season of Produce 101
- ^{4}Lee Ga-eun is a member of After School where she goes by Kaeun.
- ^{5}Bae Eun-yeong, Lee Si-an, Jang Gyu-ri and Jo Yu-ri were contestants on the survival show Idol School. Jang Gyu-ri made it into the final line-up and is now a member of Fromis 9.
- ^{6}Lee Chae-yeon was a contestant on the survival show Sixteen and the third season of K-pop Star.
- ^{7}Kwon Eun-bi is a former member of Ye-A under the stage name Kazoo.
- ^{8}Alex Christine was a winner from the first season of Soompi's Rising Legends and the final winner of the second season.
- ^{9}NMB48's Azusa Uemura and Cocona Umeyama left the show before the first episode aired due to a drone incident.
- ^{10}HKT48's Miku Tanaka and Amane Tsukiashi participated in the evaluations but left the show afterwards due to leg injuries.
- ^{11}The average vote for the second High Tension team was posted on the broadcast as 101.2. It should have been 100.8, given the sum of the votes was 504.
- ^{12}Kim Doah is a member of FENT's pre-debut group called FANATICS, and is a member of the subunit 'Flavor'.
