= Miyu Takeuchi =

Japanese singer (born 1996)

Miyu Takeuchi 竹内 美宥
- Also known as: MiyuMiyu
- Born: January 12, 1996 (age 30); Tokyo, Japan
- Genres: J-pop; K-pop
- Occupations: Singer; actress
- Instruments: Vocals; piano
- Label: King Records
- Formerly of: AKB48; Mini Skirt; Fruits

Miyu Takeuchi (竹内 美宥, Takeuchi Miyu; born January 12, 1996, in Tokyo, Japan), known professionally as MiyuMiyu, is a Japanese singer and YouTuber. She is a former member of AKB48.

== Career ==
=== 2004–2008: Pre-debut ===
Prior to joining AKB48, Takeuchi signed a contract with Stardust Promotion in 2004 and appeared in Little By Little's music video for "Ameagari no Kyū na Sakamichi". She was a member of girl group Fruits, born out of the audition TV show "Songs Star !!". In 2008, the group debuted with the single "Koi no Saison" and they disbanded the following year, in 2009.

=== 2009–2018: AKB48 and Produce 48 ===
Takeuchi passed AKB48 auditions in 2009. While she was a trainee, she was part of the sub-unit Mini Skirt and released the song "Mini Skirt no Yōsei" to promote the arcade game Pretty Rhythm: Mini Skirt, which later featured a likeness of her as a playable character during the Season 2 update. She was promoted to full member status in 2010, and was announced as a member of AKB48's newly formed Team 4 in 2011. In May, Takeuchi was selected to be part of the subunit "Ojarumaru Sisters" in order to sing "Hatsukoi wa Mitsuru", used as the ending theme of the anime Ojarumaru.

Takeuchi signed to OH Enterprise in 2012. Later that year, Team 4 was disbanded, and Takeuchi was moved to AKB48's Team B. During this time, Takeuchi uploaded home recordings of song covers on social media. In 2014, she began to post song covers on her YouTube channel. In 2021, Her YouTube Channel has amassed 230.000+ subscribers.

In 2018, Takeuchi participated in the South Korean competition series Produce 48 as one of the Japanese contestants from AKB48 and its sister groups. She finished in 17th place.

=== 2018–present: Departure from AKB48, South Korean career ===
Four days after the Produce 48 finale, on September 4, 2018, Takeuchi announced her departure from AKB48. Her last performance with AKB48 took place on December 25, 2018, and her contract with OH Enterprise ended on December 31, 2018.

On March 8, 2019, South Korean entertainment company Mystic Story announced that they had signed an official contract with Takeuchi. On October 22, 2019, Takeuchi released her first solo single, as well as her first Korean single and first single in Mystic Story, titled "My Type" (내 타입) as part of Mystic Story's CEO Yoon Jong-shin's Yoon Jong Shin Monthly Project 2019. In February 2020, Takeuchi was announced as a member of Mystic Rookies, pre-debut trainee group within the company.

On February 24, 2021, Takeuchi released her second solo single titled "Forbidden Game" (왠지 그럼 안될 것 같아) as part of Yoon Jong Shin's Yoon Jong Shin Monthly Repair Project . On May 3, 2021, Takeuchi announced the end of her exclusive contract with Mystic Story. On May 5, 2021, Takeuchi uploaded a video to her YouTube channel explaining her departure from the company, stating that she originally signed a contract to debut as a solo artist and left when they instead arranged for her to debut in a girl group. In the same year, she was featured on the song "Sentimental" in Night Tempo's 2021 album Ladies in the City.

On February 23, 2024, Takeuchi announced that she would release music under the stage name MiyuMiyu and released the song "Matome" digitally on the same day.

== Personal life ==
Takeuchi was accepted to Keio University in 2013, attending classes at Keio University's Shonan Fujisawa campus while continuing to perform at the AKB48 theater in Akihabara.

== Discography ==
=== As main artist ===
Title	Year	Album
"My Type" (내 타입)	2019	Yoon Jong Shin Monthly Project 2019: October
"Forbidden Game" (왠지 그럼 안될 것 같아)	2021	

=== As featured artist ===
Title	Year	Album
"Oyoge! Taiyaki-kun" (with Junichi Inagaki)	2015	A Man and A Woman 5
"Kimi ni Todoke" (with Kobasolo)	2017	Collection
"Sangatsu Kokonoka" (with Kobasolo)	2017	Collection
"Baby I Love U" (with Kobasolo)	2019	Collection 2
"Sentimental" (with Night Tempo)	2021	Ladies in The City

=== Singles with AKB48 ===
Title	Year	Album
"Manatsu no Sounds Good!	2012	Tsugi no Ashiato
"Eien Pressure"	2012	Tsugi no Ashiato
"No Way Man"	2018	Non-album single

=== Other appearances ===
Title	Year	Album
"Nekkoya (Pick Me)" (Produce 48 theme song)	2018	Non-album single
"See You Again"	2018	30 Girls 6 Concepts
"We Together"	2018	Produce 48 – Final

== Filmography ==
=== Film ===
Year	Title	Role	Notes
2012	Shiritsu Bakaleya Koukou	Nozomi Yuusa	
2014	Nemurihime: Dream On Dreamer	Hiiragi	

=== Television series ===
Year	Title	Role	Network	Notes
2012	Majisuka Gakuen	Miyu	TV Tokyo	Season 3

=== Television shows ===
Year	Title	Role	Network	Notes
2010–2018	AKBingo!	Herself	Nippon TV	Variety show regular
2011–2017	AKB48 Nemousu TV	Herself	Family Gekijo	Variety show regular
2013–2018	AKB48 Show!	Herself	NHK	Variety show regular
2018	Produce 48	Herself	Mnet	Reality competition show

=== Game ===
Year	Title	Role	Notes
2010	Pretty Rhythm: Mini Skirt	Miyumiyu	Season 2

== Radio shows ==
Year	Title	Role	Network
2013–2015	AKB48 Konya wa Kaeranai ("AKB48 Not Going Home Tonight")	Host (with Karen Iwata, Tomu Muto)	Chubu-Nippon Broadcasting
