= I Really Like You (disambiguation) =

I Really Like You is a song by Carly Rae Jepsen from 2015.

I Really Like You may also refer to:

- "I Really Like You", the literal meaning of the television series Count Your Lucky Stars
- "I Really Like You", a song by Melissa Etheridge from the album Your Little Secret
- "I Really Like You", a song by Jewelry from the album Beloved
- "I Really Like You", a song by Pharrell Williams from the album In My Mind
- "I Really Like You (Not Him)", a song by Pia Zadora from the album When the Lights Go Out
- "Really Like You", a song by Iz*One from the EP Heart*Iz

== See also ==
- "I Really Like It", a song that was released by Harlem World in 1999
- "I Really Love You", a song that was released by The Stereos in 1961
- "I Really Want You", a song that was released by James Blunt in 2008
- "I Don't Really Like You", a song that was released by Skye Sweetnam in 2004
- "Hate (I Really Don't Like You)", a song that was released by The Plain White T's in 2006
- I Like You (disambiguation)
