= Pick Me =

Pick Me may refer to:

- PickMe, a taxi-hailing app based in Sri Lanka
- Pick Me!, a daytime game show from the UK (2015)
- "Pick Me" (song), a 2015 hit song used as the theme for the South Korean TV contest show Produce 101
  - "It's Me (Pick Me)", a 2017 song used as the theme for Produce 101 Season 2
  - "Nekkoya (Pick Me)", a 2018 song used as the theme for Produce 48
- "Pick Me", a song by Girl in Red from I'm Doing It Again Baby! (2024)
