= Color*Iz =

- Digital and "Color" version cover

EP by Iz*One
- Released: October 29, 2018
- Recorded: September – October 2018
- Genres: K-pop; J-pop
- Length: 25:27 (Digital); 30:06 (Physical)
- Languages: Korean; Japanese
- Labels: Off the Record; Stone Music; Genie

Iz*One chronology
Color*Iz (2018)	Heart*Iz (2019)

Singles from Color*Iz
- 1. "La Vie en Rose" Released: October 29, 2018

Color*Iz (stylized in all caps; pronounced "colorize") is the debut extended play (EP) by South Korean–Japanese girl group Iz*One, a project group formed through the 2018 Mnet reality competition show Produce 48. The album was released on October 29, 2018 by Off the Record Entertainment. It is available in two versions: "Rose" and "Color", and contains seven tracks (eight for the physical edition) with "La Vie en Rose" as its lead single.

The album broke the record for highest first week sales of a debut album by a girl group and became the fourth highest first week sales of an album by a South Korean girl group on Hanteo. It debuted atop both the Oricon Weekly Album Chart and Oricon Weekly Digital Album Chart in Japan while in South Korea, it charted at number two on the Gaon Album Chart on its first week. Color Iz also peaked at number nine on Billboard's World Albums chart while "La Vie en Rose" peaked at number six on the World Digital Songs chart, making Iz*One only the eighth Korean girl group to have their debut release appear on both the World Albums and World Digital Songs charts.

== Background and release ==
Iz*One was formed through the reality show Produce 48, the third season of Mnet's Produce 101 series of competition shows, in collaboration with Yasushi Akimoto's AKB48 Group, which aimed to create a "global" girl group primarily active in both South Korea and Japan. With the show wrapping up in August 2018, the group's label, Off the Record, announced that Iz*One will make their official debut later that year in October. Iz*One immediately started preparations for their debut after the show's finale and the members were put on a tight schedule as they recorded their debut album and filmed for various shows and their title track's music video, making it difficult for member Chaewon who also had to prepare for the College Scholastic Ability Test in South Korea.

The debut EP, titled Color*Iz, was announced two weeks prior to its release. Iz*One completed filming the music video for the album's lead single, "La Vie en Rose" on October 18, 2018.

Color*Iz was released on October 29, 2018, along with the lead single's music video, through various music platforms, including Melon, Apple Music, and Spotify. On November 4, 2018, Iz*One released a choreography video of "La Vie en Rose" on YouTube

== Composition ==
The lead single "La Vie en Rose" is described by Billboard as a vibrant, groovy electropop track that blends a wide range of elements like ambient synths, stomping beats, tinny snare and echoing strings. The album also contains Iz*One's versions of "We Together", "You're in Love, Right?" and "As We Dream" which were featured on and originally performed by the contestants of Produce 48.

== Promotion ==
Iz*One held a debut showcase concert, entitled "COLOR*IZ Show-Con", on October 29, 2018 at the Olympic Hall in Seoul, South Korea. The tickets to the showcase were sold-out within a minute of being on sale. The showcase was broadcast live on YouTube and Facebook. The group filmed for the South Korean variety show Idol Room on October 17, and the episode was aired on October 30 on JTBC. They also appeared on the October 31 episode of Weekly Idol.

The group made their debut stage on November 1, performing "O' My!" and "La Vie en Rose" on Mnet's M Countdown, followed by KBS' Music Bank and MBC's Show! Music Core. The group earned their first music show win on November 8, 2018 on M! Countdown, making them the fastest female group to win on a music show since debuting with a record of 10 days.

=== Music video ===
The official music video for "La Vie en Rose" is inspired by the color red, as the title is French for "The Life in Pink", with the twelve members seen singing and dancing in red-and-leather outfits. It was choreographed entirely by Chae Da-som, with the exception of the pre-chorus which was modified by member Kwon Eun-bi. It achieved more than 4.5 million views in the first 24 hours of its release on YouTube, surpassing the previous record held by Stray Kids for most views of a K-pop group's debut music video within 24 hours. Four days later, the music video exceeded 10 million views on YouTube.

== Reception ==
Tamar Herman of Billboard opined that the lead single is "Captivating from the get-go" and that the group served up an introductory track that is "all at once powerful and delicate". She further added that "Rather than coming off as contradictory, the duality featured in Iz*One's debut song and video hints to the act's potential amid one of the most experimental pop music scenes in the world and highlights why these 12 were handpicked from among the nearly 100 women who competed for a spot in the group on this year's Produce 48".

== Commercial performance ==
South Korea's Hanteo Chart reported that Color*Iz broke the record for highest first week sales of a debut album for girl groups by selling more than 34,000 units on the day of its release. Iz*One subsequently became the fourth highest K-pop girl group in first week album sales after selling of about 80,000 copies, as recorded by Hanteo. Color*Iz charted at number two on the Gaon Album Chart on its first week, while the single "La vie en Rose" charted at number 14 on the Gaon Digital Chart. All seven tracks debuted on the Gaon Download Chart and with only three days to accumulate points, the album charted at number 4 on the Monthly Gaon Album Chart, selling 98,311 copies in October. In Japan, the album debuted atop both the Oricon Weekly Album Chart and Oricon Weekly Digital Album Chart, selling 12,000 physical copies and 3,000 digital copies respectively for the week of October 29 – November 4, 2018. The album also charted at number nine on Billboard's World Albums chart while "La Vie en Rose" debuted at number six on the World Digital Songs chart. According to Nielsen Music, it sold 1,000 copies from October 26 to November 1 and was the week's best-selling k-pop song. Iz*One became only the eight Korean girl group to have their debut release appear on both the World Albums and World Digital Songs charts.

== Track listing ==
Credits adapted from Melon and Apple Music.

Color*Iz – Digital download
No.	Title	Lyrics	Music	Arrangement	Length
1.	"Colors" (아름다운 색; aleumdaun saeg; lit: Beautiful Colors)	Tenzo; Kebee; Fixman	Choi Jae-sung(Tenzo); Fixman	Choi Jae-sung(Tenzo); Fixman; Muna	3:38
2.	"O' My!"	Hidden Sound (HSND); Han Kang (HSND); Shin Jae-young (HSND); Jo Yoon-kyung	Hidden Sound (HSND); Han Kang (HSND); Shin Jae-young (HSND)	Hidden Sound (HSND); Han Kang (HSND); Shin Jae-young (HSND)	3:23
3.	"La Vie en Rose" (라비앙로즈; labianglojeu; lit: The Life in Pink)	MosPick	MosPick	MosPick	3:39
4.	"Memory" (비밀의 시간; bimil-ui sigan; Secret Time)	Boombastic	Boombastic	Boombastic	3:23
5.	"We Together (Iz*One ver.)" (앞으로 잘 부탁해; ap-eulo jal butaghae; lit: Thank You In The Future)	Baekgom; Bbaekkom	Baekgom; Park Ki-tae (Prismfilter)	Park Ki-tae (Prismfilter)	3:46
6.	"Suki ni Nacchau Darō? (Iz*One ver.)" (반해버리잖아? / 好きになっちゃうだろう? / You're in Love, Right?)	Yasushi Akimoto	Hayakawa Hirotaka; Belex	Hayakawa Hirotaka; Belex	4:09
7.	"Yume wo Miteiru Aida (Iz*One ver.)" (꿈을 꾸는 동안 / 夢を見ている間 / As We Dream)	Yasushi Akimoto	Iggy; Yong-bae	Iggy; Yong-bae	3:29
Total length:					25:31

Color*Iz – Physical edition
No.	Title	Lyrics	Music	Arrangement	Length
8.	"Pick Me (Iz*One ver.)" (내꺼야; naekkeoya; lit: It's Mine)	Produce 48	Flow Blow; airair; Louise Frick Sveen	Flow Blow; airair	4:39
Total length:					30:11

== Charts ==
=== Weekly charts ===
Chart (2018)	Peak position
French Digital Albums (SNEP)	184
Japanese Albums (Oricon)	1
Japan Hot Albums (Billboard)	3
South Korean Albums (Gaon)	2
US World Albums (Billboard)	9

=== Year-end charts ===
Chart (2018)	Position
South Korean Albums (Gaon)	24

== Certifications and sales ==
Region	Certification	Certified units/sales
South Korea (KMCA)	Platinum	250,000^{^}
^{^} Shipments figures based on certification alone.

== Release history ==
Region	Date	Format	Label
South Korea	October 29, 2018	CD; digital download; streaming	Off the Record Entertainment; Stone Music Entertainment; Genie Music
Various	October 29, 2018	Digital download, streaming	Off the Record Entertainment; Stone Music Entertainment; Genie Music
