= I Like You =

I Like You may refer to:

- "I Like You" (Phyllis Nelson song), 1985
- "I Like You (A Happier Song)" by Post Malone, 2022
- "I Like You", a song by Ciipher, 2021
- I Like You (A Lot), a 1999 album by Ralph Carney
- I Like You (TV series), a South Korean series also known as Only Because It's You

== See also ==
- Bade Achche Lagte Hain (disambiguation) (lit. 'I Like You' in Hindi)
