= Produce 48 – Final =

EP by Produce 48 contestants
- Released: September 1, 2018
- Genre: K-pop; J-pop
- Label: Stone Music Entertainment

Produce 48 contestants chronology
30 Girls 6 Concepts (2018)	Produce 48 – Final (2018)

Produce 48 – Final is an extended play by contestants of the South Korean survival show Produce 48. It was released as a digital album on September 1, 2018, by Stone Music Entertainment.

== Background and release ==
Produce 48 was a South Korean survival show that aired on Mnet from June 15, 2018, to August 31, 2018, where 96 trainees from various entertainment companies competed to debut in a 12-member girl group, which would promote for two and a half years.

The EP was released as a digital album through several music portals, including MelOn and iTunes.

== Commercial performance ==
The songs failed to enter the main chart on the Gaon Digital Chart, but three songs debuted on the componing Download Chart on the week ending September 1: "Yume wo Miteiru Aida (Korean Ver.)" at number 80, "We Together" at 94 and "Suki ni Nacchau Daro?" at 96. In a second week, "Suki ni Nacchau Daro?" peaked at number 91, meanwhile "Yume wo Miteiru Aida (Korean Ver.)" placed at number 89 and "We Together" at 95.

== Track listing ==
Digital download
No.	Title	Lyrics	Music	Arrangement	Length
1.	"앞으로 잘 부탁해 (We Together)"	Baekgom; Bbaekkom; Bernard	Baekgom; Park Gi-tae	Park Gi-tae	4:03
2.	"Suki ni Nacchau Darō? (好きになっちゃうだろう？)"	Yasushi Akimoto	Hirotaka Hayakawa; Belex	Hirotaka Hayakawa; Belex	4:09
3.	"Yume o Miteiru Aida (Korean Version)" (꿈을 꾸는 동안 (夢を見ている間) Korean Ver.)	Yasushi Akimoto	Iggy (OREO); Youngbae (RBW)	Iggy (OREO); Youngbae (RBW)	3:28
4.	"Yume o Miteiru Aida (Japanese Version)" (꿈을 꾸는 동안 (夢を見ている間) Japanese Ver.)	Yasushi Akimoto	Iggy (OREO); Youngbae (RBW)	Iggy (OREO); Youngbae (RBW)	3:28
