= Heart*Iz =

- Digital and "Violeta" version cover

EP by Iz*One
- Released: April 1, 2019
- Recorded: March 2019
- Genre: K-pop; pop; tropical house
- Length: 28:21
- Language: Korean
- Label: Off the Record; Stone Music

Iz*One chronology
Color*Iz (2018)	Heart*Iz (2019)	Bloom*Iz (2020)

Singles from Heart*Iz
- 1. "Violeta" Released: April 1, 2019

Heart*Iz (stylized in all caps, pronounced "heart eyes") is the second extended play (EP) by South Korean–Japanese girl group Iz*One, a project group formed through the 2018 Mnet reality competition show Produce 48. The EP was released on April 1, 2019 by Off the Record Entertainment. It is available in two versions: "Violeta" and "Sapphire", and consists of eight tracks with "Violeta" serving as its lead single.

== Background and release ==
The music video for the lead single "Violeta" was released on April 1, 2019 on YouTube, alongside the physical and digital release of the EP through various music sites.

Off the Record released a special video in commemoration of achieving 40 million views for "Violeta" music video.

== Promotion ==
A comeback showcase, entitled "Heart To", was held at the Blue Square on the same day as the album's release, where Iz*One performed the songs from the EP for the first time. It was broadcast live via Mnet and Stone Music's YouTube channel. The group recorded for variety show Idol Room and was broadcast on JTBC on April 2, 2019.

== Commercial performance ==
On March 29, 2019, Off the Record reported that the pre-order sales for Heart*Iz had surpassed 200,000 copies. The EP sold 132,109 copies in the first week, setting a new record for the highest number of sales for girl groups in its first week of release at the time. Heart*Iz subsequently topped in both Gaon Album and Oricon Overseas Album Charts.

== Awards and nominations ==
Awards and nominations for Heart*Iz
Organization	Year	Award	Result
Golden Disc Awards	2020	Disc Bonsang	Nominated
Seoul Music Awards	2020	Bonsang Award	Nominated

== Track listing ==
No.	Title	Lyrics	Music	Arrangement	Length
1.	"해바라기" (Hey. Bae. Like It.; lit. Sunflower)	Tenzo; Kebee; EB	Tenzo; MUNA	MUNA	3:32
2.	"비올레타" (Violeta)	Choi Hyun-joon; Kim Seung-soo	Choi Hyun-joon; Kim Seung-soo	Park Seul-gi	3:20
3.	"Highlight"	Lee Tae-hoon	Lee Tae-hoon; Sam Carter; RAMI NU; bK	Lee Tae-hoon	3:28
4.	"Really Like You"	YOSKE; Kim Min-ju; Hitomi Honda; Alive Knoh	EastWest (1by1); YOSKE	EastWest (1by1)	3:10
5.	"Airplane"	Lee Dae-hwi; So Jay; Jo Yoon-kyung; Jang Yeo-jin	Lee Dae-hwi; 리시; Simpson	리시; Simpson	3:03
6.	"하늘 위로" (Up; lit: Above the Sky)	KZ	KZ; Nthonius	KZ; Nthonius	3:12
7.	"고양이가 되고 싶어" (Neko ni Naritai; Korean version; lit. I Wanna Be a Cat)	Yasushi Akimoto; (Korean version; adapted by) Kim Min-ju	Shintaro Fujiwara	Shintaro Fujiwara	4:16
8.	"기분 좋은 안녕" (Gokigen Sayonara; Korean version; lit. Happy Goodbye)	Yasushi Akimoto; (Korean version; adapted by) Lee Chae-yeon	Toshihiko Watanabe	Toshihiko Watanabe	4:20
Total length:					28:32

== Charts ==
=== Weekly charts ===
Chart (2019)	Peak position
Japanese Albums (Oricon)	4
Japanese Hot Albums (Billboard Japan)	5
South Korean Albums (Gaon)	1
US World Albums (Billboard)	6

=== Year-end charts ===
Chart (2019)	Position
South Korean Albums (Gaon)	21

== Certifications and sales ==
Region	Certification	Certified units/sales
South Korea (KMCA)	Platinum	250,000^{^}
^{^} Shipments figures based on certification alone.

== Release history ==
Region	Date	Format	Label
South Korea	April 1, 2019	CD; digital download; streaming	Off the Record Entertainment; Stone Music Entertainment
Various	April 1, 2019	Digital download, streaming	Off the Record Entertainment; Stone Music Entertainment

== See also ==
- List of Gaon Album Chart number ones of 2020
- List of K-pop albums on the Billboard charts
