= Bade Achche Lagte Hain =

Bade Achche Lagte Hain (lit. 'I Like You' in Hindi) may refer to:

- "Bade Achche Lagte Hain" (song), a song by Amit Kumar from the 1976 Indian film Balika Badhu
- Bade Achhe Lagte Hain, a 2011 Indian soap opera
  - Bade Achhe Lagte Hain 2 (2021), its second season
  - Bade Achhe Lagte Hain 3 (2023), its third season
  - Bade Achhe Lagte Hain 4 (2025), its fourth season

== See also ==
- I Like You (disambiguation)
