= 30 Girls 6 Concepts =

EP by Produce 48 contestants
- Released: August 18, 2018
- Genre: K-pop
- Language: Korean
- Label: Stone Music Entertainment

Produce 48 contestants chronology
30 Girls 6 Concepts (2018)	Produce 48 – Final (2018)

30 Girls 6 Concepts is an EP by contestants of the South Korean survival show Produce 48. It was released digitally on August 18, 2018 by Stone Music Entertainment.

== Background ==
Produce 48 was a South Korean survival show that aired on Mnet from June 15, 2018, to August 31, where 96 female trainees from various entertainment companies competed to debut in a 12-member girl group which would promote for two and a half years under Stone Music Entertainment.

== Commercial performance ==
All six songs from the EP entered the Gaon Digital Chart on the week ending August 25: "Rumor" at number 24, "To Reach You" at 57, "Rollin' Rollin'" at 66, "1000%" at 70, "See You Again" at 80 and "I Am" at 92. All the songs also entered the Kpop Hot 100 on the week ending August 26. In its second week, three songs remained on the Digital Chart: "Rumor" placed at number 57, "To Reach You" at 85, "Rollin' Rollin'" at 95. Also four songs remained on the Hot 100: "Rumor" placed at number 58, "To Reach You" at 81, "Rollin' Rollin'" at 91 and "1000%" at 98. In its third week, "Rumor" placed at number 66 on the Digital Chart and at 68 on the Hot 100, meanwhile "To Reach You" at 97 on the latest. In its fourth week, "Rumor" placed at number 80 on the Digital Chart and at 77 on the Hot 100. In a fifth week, "Rumor" placed at number 99 on the Digital Chart and at 94 on the Hot 100.

"Rumor" was the 83rd best-selling song of August 2018.

== Track listing ==
No.	Title	Lyrics	Music	Arrangement	Length
1.	"Rollin' Rollin'" (Love Potion)	Dally; Sin-kung; Wonderkid	Sin-kung; Wonderkid	Dally; Sin-kung; Wonderkid	2:55
2.	"To Reach You" (너에게 닿기를; Memory Fabricators)	Lee Sang-ho; Yong-bae (RBW)	Lee Sang-ho; Yong-bae (RBW)	Lee Sang-ho; Yong-bae (RBW)	3:30
3.	"Rumor" (H.I.N.P)	SCORE; Megatone; EDEN; J.rise	SCORE(Lee Kwan); Megatone(Kim Byeong Seok); EDEN	SCORE; Megatone; EDEN	3:17
4.	"See You Again" (다시 만나; The Promise)	Lee Dae-hwi	Lee Dae-hwi; Lissie; Simpson	Lee Dae-hwi; Lissie; Simpson	3:07
5.	"1000%" (Summer Wish)	Iggy (Oreo); Cino (Oreo); Uh-kim (Oreo)	Iggy (Oreo); Cino (Oreo); Uh-kim (Oreo)	Cino (Oreo); Uh-kim (Oreo)	3:36
6.	"I Am" (1AM)	Jinri (Full8loom)	Glory Face (Full8oom); Jake K (Full8loom); Jinri (Full8loom)	Glory Face (Full8oom); Jake K (Full8loom)	3:24

== Charts ==
Chart (2018)	Peak position
US World Albums (Billboard)	9

=== Songs ===
Title	Year	Peak chart positions	
Title	Year	KOR	KOR Hot.
"Rumor"	2018	24	37
"To Reach You" (너에게 닿기를)	2018	57	61
"Rollin' Rollin'"	2018	66	66
"1000%"	2018	70	68
"See You Again" (다시 만나)	2018	80	79
"I Am"	2018	92	90
