= This Is! Ralph Carney =

Studio album by Ralph Carney
- Released: March 25, 2003
- Studio: Rugbeaters' Studio (San Francisco)
- Genre: Avant-garde; experimental
- Length: 59:53
- Label: Black Beauty
- Producer: Ralph Carney

Ralph Carney chronology
I Like You (1999)	This Is! Ralph Carney (2003)	Ralph Carney's Serious Jass Project (2009)

This Is! Ralph Carney is an avant-garde and experimental studio album by American multi-instrumentalist, singer and composer Ralph Carney, released on March 25, 2003, by Black Beauty Records.

== Critical reception ==
Professional ratings
Review scores
Source	Rating
Robert Christgau	2/5 stars

Music journalist Robert Christgau gave the album two stars, and called Carney "a Buckeye Hornman--not quite as funny as a Hoosier Hotshot, but sweeter ("Turkey Neck," "Jug Gland Music")."

== Track listing ==
Side one

1. "Jug Gland Band" – 2:32
2. "Get Yur Bargain" – 4:52
3. "Swamp Horse" – 2:22
4. "Pele Mele" – 4:25
5. "Ultra Bowl" – 1:49
6. "Man Don't Come" – 2:21
7. "Tis Sad" – 5:07
8. "Marshall Allen Plan" – 1:26

Side two

9. "Heckraiser" – 8:06
10. "Cow Lap" – 2:44
11. "March of the Annunaki" – 2:19
12. "Turkey Neck" – 3:14
13. "Hell Week" – 2:53
14. "15 April 2002" – 12:43
15. "Solitude" – 3:00
