= I Like You (A Lot) =

Studio album by Ralph Carney
- Released: 1999
- Studio: Rugbeaters Studio (San Francisco)
- Genre: Avant-garde; Experimental
- Length: 51:34
- Label: Akron Cracker; Birdman
- Producer: Deena Zacharin

Ralph Carney chronology
Ralph Sounds (1997)	I Like You (A Lot) (1999)	This Is! Ralph Carney (2003)

Professional ratings
Review scores
Source	Rating
AllMusic	4/5 stars

I Like You (A Lot) is an avant-garde/experimental music album by American multi-instrumentalist/singer Ralph Carney. It was released via Akron Cracker/Birdman Records in 1999.

== Critical reception ==
AllMusic thought that "Carney's sound imagineering defies classification (maybe it's skronk), though it has far more in common with the jazz avant garde of Ornette Coleman and John Coltrane than anything rock." SF Weekly stated that "Carney plays a dizzying array of instruments—countless saxophones, clarinet, oud, banjo, trombone, violin, mandolin, cello, saw, harmonica—but each song seems to have a beginning, middle, and end." Keyboard wrote that "there's more going on than just Spike Jones on marijuana ... 'Mile's Corner' serves up a serious slice of jazz."

== Track listing ==
1. Fun House 3:09
2. Chant of the Weed 3:04
3. I Like You 3:39
4. Hawaiian Eye 1:47
5. Mile's Corner 5:08
6. Eye Protection 3:07
7. Far Oud 4:30
8. Tube Socks 1:39
9. Death Don't Come Easy 3:45
10. Funky Fred From France 3:18
11. Dirge Part 2 3:08
12. Fluids 3:06
13. Brian The Beach Man 3:20
14. Helga 2:39
15. Christopher Columbus (1936 Chu Berry Andy Razaf) 2:25
16. Circling Laguardia 2:44
17. The End 0:15
