= Produce 48 =

South Korean reality competition series

- Promotional poster
- Genre: Reality competition
- Created by: Kim Young-bum for Mnet
- Directed by: Ahn Joonyoung
- Presented by: Lee Seung-gi
- Opening theme: "Nekkoya (Pick Me)" by all contestants
- Country of origin: South Korea
- Original languages: Korean; Japanese
- No. of episodes: 12

Production
- Executive producers: Kim Han-soo; Kim Young-bum
- Running time: 140–160 minutes 240 minutes (Finale)
- Production companies: AKATV; CJ E&M

Original release
- Network: Mnet
- Release: June 15 – August 31, 2018

Produce 48 (Korean: 프로듀스 48) is the third season of the South Korean reality competition series Produce 101. It was a large-scale project in which the public "produces" a girl group by voting for members out of a pool of 96 contestants from South Korea and Japan, as well as voting for the group's concept, name and debut single. The show was a collaboration between the Mnet series Produce 101 and the J-pop idol group AKB48. The winning 12 contestants, with no nationality caps, as voted only by Korean viewers, would promote as a group for two years and six months. The show announced the final 12 members who made it into, as well as the official name of the group Iz*One during the finale on August 31, 2018.

Produced by AKATV (the company that also produced the second season of Produce 101) for Mnet, the show premiered on June 15, 2018, and concluded on August 31, 2018, with 12 episodes. It was directed and produced by Ahn Joon-young, who also directed the first two seasons of Produce 101.

Following irregularities in the patterns of votes, an investigation into Mnet in 2019 found that Ahn and seven others had pre-determined the lineups of Produce 101 groups, and subsequently manipulated vote counts to favor certain contestants, in exchange for financial favors. Ahn and the show's executive producer, Kim Young-bum, were sentenced to prison in 2021 on charges of fraud and bribery.

== Concept and format ==
Produce 48 brought together 96 girls from idol groups and entertainment companies in Japan and South Korea to form a 12-person Korean-Japanese group that would promote for two and a half years. Formed as a collaboration between Mnet and Yasushi Akimoto, the project planned to adopt the AKB48's concept of "idols you can meet and greet" and be able to perform in a designated theatre. Members of the group are able to promote under their own agencies concurrently, as the show, and the groups' promotions thereafter, are recorded in batches.

The show started with 96 contestants, who were initially grouped into several classes. Episodic competitions were featured in which girls performed in teams on various songs, and were voted by the studio audience, with the winning teams receiving a number of bonus votes to apply to their overall vote count. The viewer-submitted votes were then applied and the girls were ranked, with certain episodes being elimination rounds to reduce the remaining number of contestants.

Of the 96 contestants, 57 of them were from South Korean idol groups and companies, and the other 39 were from Japanese idol groups, consisting of current members of AKB48 and their sister groups. The final 12 were selected regardless of nationality.

== Promotions and broadcast ==
The concept for Produce 48 was revealed at the 2017 Mnet Asian Music Awards in Japan on November 29, 2017, following a joint performance by AKB48 and South Korean artists Weki Meki, Chungha, Pristin, Idol School and Fromis 9. In February 2018, Mnet stated that it would not use the speculated format of having 48 girls from South Korea and 48 girls from Japan competing separately, or that six members of each country would be selected.

The first teaser for the show was released on April 11, 2018. On April 22, the series' theme song "Nekkoya (Pick Me)" (내꺼야 (Pick Me)) was recorded by the contestants of the show with HKT48's Sakura Miyawaki and Lee Ka-eun as center. The winners of the previous series, I.O.I and Wanna One, made appearances at the recording. Produce 48's contestants performed the theme song on Episode 570 of M Countdown in May 2018.

The show premiered on June 15, 2018, on Mnet in South Korea and Mnet Japan. It is also being broadcast in Japan on BS Sky PerfecTV. CJ E&M is also live streaming the series on their TVing Global service. The series was broadcast on tvN Asia in Hong Kong, Singapore, Macau, Malaysia, Indonesia, Taiwan, Thailand, Sri Lanka, the Philippines, Cambodia and Myanmar where it premiered on June 21, 2018.

== Staff members ==
The series was presented by Lee Seung-gi. Other artists featured as cast members:

- Vocal trainers:
  - Lee Hong-gi
  - Soyou
- Dance trainers:
  - Bae Yoon-jeong
  - Choi Young-jun
  - May J Lee
- Rap trainer:
  - Cheetah
- Special MC's:
  - Jeon So-mi (Episodes 1 and 5)
  - Kang Daniel (Episode 1)
  - Kim Chung-ha (Episode 5)
  - Bora (Position Evaluation - Episodes 6 and 7)

One-day Dance Judge: Kahi (Episode 1-2)

One-day Healing Mentor: Bora (Episode 11)

== Contestants ==
Color key (In order of contestant's rank on the show)

Final members of Iz*One
Contestants eliminated in the finale
Contestants eliminated in the third elimination round
Contestants eliminated in the second elimination round
Contestants eliminated in the first elimination round
Contestants that left the show

96 contestants
Jang Won-young (장원영)	Sakura Miyawaki (宮脇咲良)	Jo Yu-ri (조유리)	Choi Ye-na (최예나)	An Yu-jin (안유진)
Nako Yabuki (취내자)	Kwon Eun-bi (권은비)	Kang Hye-won (강혜원)	Hitomi Honda (전인미)	Kim Chaewon (김채원)
Kim Min-ju (김민주)	Lee Chae-yeon (이채연)	Han Cho-won (한초원)	Lee Ga-eun (이가은)	Miho Miyazaki (김미호)
Juri Takahashi (고주리)	Miyu Takeuchi (죽미유)	Miu Shitao (하미우)	Park Hae-yoon (박해윤)	Miru Shiroma (백미류)
Kim Na-young (김나영)	Sae Murase (村瀬紗英)	Kim Do-ah (김도아)	Moe Goto (後藤萌咲)	Jang Gyu-ri (장규리)
Huh Yunjin (허윤진)	Kim Si-hyeon (김시현)	Wang Yiren (왕이런)	Na Go-eun (나고은)	Lee Si-an (이시안)
Go Yu-jin (고유진)	Son Eun-chae (손은채)	Erii Chiba (千葉恵里)	Mako Kojima (소도진자)	Yoon Hae-sol (윤해솔)
Bae Eun-yeong (배은영)	Chiyori Nakanishi (서대리)	Tomu Muto (武藤十夢)	Minami Sato (좌미파)	Saho Iwatate (이사호)
Noe Yamada (전야회)	Nanami Asai (정칠해)	Kim So-hee (김소희)	Kim Min-seo (김민서)	Vivian Murakawa (천비행)
Kim Hyun-ah (김현아)	Kim Su-yun (김수윤)	Lee Ha-eun (이하은)	Misaki Aramaki (황미소)	Kim Cho-yeon (김초연)
Lee Yu-jeong (이유정)	Aoi Motomura (本村碧唯)	Park Min-ji (박민지)	Yu Min-young (유민영)	Park Seo-young (박서영)
Wang Ke (왕크어)	Cho Ka-hyeon (조가현)	Jurina Matsui (松井珠理奈)	Ikumi Nakano (중욱해)	Hwang So-yeon (황소연)
Shin Su-hyun (신수현)	Kang Da-min (강다민)	Shinobu Mogi (茂木忍)	Erina Oda (전리나)	Yoon Eun-bin (윤은빈)
Choi Yeon-soo (최연수)	Natsumi Matsuoka (松岡菜摘)	Park Chan-ju (박찬주)	Park Jinny (박진희)	Kim Da-yeon (김다연)
Rena Hasegawa (장영내)	Cho Ah-yeong (조아영)	Lee Seung-hyeon (이승현)	Yuuka Kato (加藤夕夏)	Kim Da-hye (김다혜)
Mina Imada (이미나)	Serika Nagano (야근가)	Hong Ye-ji (홍예지)	Lee Chae-jeong (이채정)	Park Ji-eun (박지은)
Manami Ichikawa (천애미)	Alex Christine (알렉스 크리스틴)	Sae Kurihara (율사영)	Cho Yeong-in (조영인)	Yuka Asai (정유화)
Ahn Ye-won (안예원)	Kokoro Naiki (内木志)	Kim Yu-bin (김유빈)	Cho Sa-rang (조사랑)	Choi So-eun (최소은)
Ayana Shinozaki (기채내)	Won Seo-yeon (원서연)	Miku Tanaka (전미구)	Cocona Umeyama (매연화)	Amane Tsukiashi (월천음)
Azusa Uemura (식재사)				

== Episodes ==
No.	Title	Original release date
1	"Episode 1"	June 15, 2018
The contestants enter the studio, where seats are arranged in a pyramid numbered from 1 to 96. Each contestant is introduced according to their company or group, with their self-predicted rankings shown on a monitor above the stage. After all 96 girls are seated, Jeon So-mi and Kang Daniel, the first place winners of the past two seasons, enter as special MC's to explain the rules of the competition. They reveal that top producers Han Sung-soo and Yasushi Akimoto will be involved in producing the debut album of the final group, which will be composed of 12 members. The contestants then perform in front of the mentors for evaluation. Each individual is given a letter grade from A to F based on their overall talents, organizing them into temporary classes for training. At the end, the popularity ranking is shown with HKT48's Sakura Miyawaki taking first place.
2	"Episode 2"	June 22, 2018
After the contestants are grouped according to their grades, the mentors announce that they will be performing on M Countdown with Produce 48's theme song "Nekkoya (Pick Me)", which has a Korean and a Japanese version. Their line distribution and positioning on stage will be determined by their grades, with A having the most while F are backup dancers. The contestants are given three days to memorize the choreography and the lyrics to both versions of the song, after which they will undergo a re-evaluation and have their grades reassigned. The contestants film themselves performing the song individually - once in Korean and once in Japanese. Each video is then watched and evaluated by the mentors. The girls are then given their new grades and asked to move into their new practice rooms. The episode ends with an A-class contestant being moved down to F, a first in Produce history.
3	"Episode 3"	June 29, 2018
The contestants move to their new groups, after which the new A class girls compete for the center position in "Nekkoya (Pick Me)". Each girl is given one minute to appeal to the lower classes, who proceed to vote for their center pick. HKT48's Sakura Miyawaki is chosen to be the center. After the live performance on M Countdown, the girls have their first meeting with producer Lee Seung-gi. Lee explains that the next event is a group battle: contestants are organized into 16 teams of 5-6 members; 2 teams compete against each other on a pop song. The options are "High Tension" by AKB48, "Peek-a-Boo by Red Velvet", "Very Very Very" by I.O.I, "Short Hair" by AOA, "Love Whisper" by GFriend, "Like Ooh-Ahh (Japanese version)" by Twice, "Mamma Mia (Japanese version)" by Kara, and "Boombayah" by Blackpink. The teams practice and then perform the songs, with each individual being voted on separately by the studio audience, and with the members on the winning team for their song receiving a bonus of 1000 votes.
4	"Episode 4"	July 6, 2018
The rehearsals and performances of the rest of the teams are shown. Afterwards, the contestants are shown their rankings based purely on their individual votes without the group bonus. HKT48's Nako Yabuki takes first place, and is further revealed to have taken first place overall as her team won the group battle.
5	"Episode 5"	July 13, 2018
Lee Seung-gi gives words of advice to the girls. I.O.I members from the previous Produce 101 contest meet with the girls and host a dance battle, where in AKB48's Moe Goto is crowned the "Dancing Queen". The girls vote on the top 11 "visual centers", in which Wang Yi-ren takes 1st place. With online votes included, the ranks of the girls are announced from 57th place to 1st place; Lee Ga-eun is voted 1st while Minami Sato is voted 58th. The girls that are ranked 59-92 are eliminated from the competition. This episode also marks Jurina Matsui's departure from the show due to health issues, despite being voted 13th.
6	"Episode 6"	July 20, 2018
Trainer Soyou met the girls this time. The trainees are tasked to perform live in groups based on positions they want to debut in: vocal/rap or dance. There are five songs for vocals and rap (Girls' Generation's "Into The New World", BTS' "The Truth Untold", Heize's "Don't Know You", Blackpink's "Ddu-Du Ddu-Du" and Wanna One's "Energetic") and four songs for dance (Fitz and the Tantrums' "HandClap", Ariana Grande's "Side to Side", Demi Lovato's "Sorry Not Sorry" and Little Mix's "Touch"). Each song has a member limit and would be picked by each trainee, starting from the 13th trainee. The top 12 trainees are the last to pick and can choose filled groups. The remaining trainees would be given extra songs (Jax Jones' "Instruction" for dance and BoA's "Merry Chri" for vocal/rap). The winner for each song will receive a 5,000 vote bonus, and the overall winner for each of the two categories will receive a 100,000 vote bonus. Also, for the next round of general voting, only 30 contestants will move on. Bora shows up as a special MC for the position battle. Vocal/rap and dance teams are shown and after each performance, they are ranked in their groups.
7	"Episode 7"	July 27, 2018
The remaining teams are shown and are ranked in their groups first and then overall in the categories. Han Cho Won emerged as the winner in the vocal/rap category and Murase Sae emerged as the winner in the dance category, both of them earning the bonus 100,000 votes.
8	"Episode 8"	August 3, 2018
Trainer Cheetah announces the beginning of the next evaluation prior to the second round of eliminations, meaning that all 58 girls that have survived so far will continue to practice for the performances, but not all of them may get to perform. The evaluation is revealed to be a concept evaluation where viewers chose group formations from a poll online. Trainer Cheetah introduces the six songs: Contemporary Girls Pop "1000%" (OREO), R&B/Hip-Hop "I Am" (Full8loom, Jake K, and Jin Lee), New Jack Swing "To Reach You" (Mask Rider), Moombahton/Trap "Rumor" (EDEN), Tropical Pop Dance "Rollin' Rollin'" (Wonderkid and Shin Kung) and Pop Dance "See You Again" (Lee Dae-hwi). The second round of eliminations takes place during the second half of the episode with the remaining 58 contestants from each company are seen entering the main studio. Names of the top 30 trainees are called by Lee Seung-gi one by one starting from rank 29. The contenders for 1st place were Ahn Yu-jin, Jang Won-young, Yabuki Nako and Kang Hye-won. It is then announced that Jang Won-young ranked at 1st place. Meanwhile, the contenders for 30th place were Takeuchi Miyu, Son Eun-chae, Go Yu-jin and Chiba Erii. It is announced that Takeuchi Miyu ranked at 30th, just escaping elimination.
9	"Episode 9"	August 10, 2018
Lee Seung-gi announced that since there's an uneven number of members after the last eliminations, groups with more than five people (Rollin' Rollin', To Reach You, Rumor and I AM) need to vote on who stays. Lee Chae-yeon is kicked out from I Am team, Goto Moe is kicked out from Rollin' Rollin' Team, Shitao Miu is kicked out from Rumor Team, and Miyawaki Sakura and Kim Min-ju are kicked out from To Reach You Team. Then, the trainees who are kicked out of their respective songs need to move to the songs with less than five members (See You Again, 1000%). Starting from the song that has the trainee with the highest rank, See You Again team gets to choose which trainee they want in their team first thanks to Kang Hye-won, who was 3rd, in which they selected Miyawaki Sakura. The rest of the trainees automatically joined 1000% team. Then, Lee Seung-gi visits the girls to give them advice and answer to their questions. The girls then divide their parts and competed for the positions they wanted and had also went to the studio of the producer's of their respective songs to check if the positions were matched well with the contestants. Right after that, they faced an evaluation in front of Lee Seung-gi, their trainers and the songs' composers and choreographers. No performances are aired in this episode.
10	"Episode 10"	August 17, 2018
This episode shows the live performances for all six concept evaluations. Rollin' Rollin' group (composed of Shiroma Miru, Honda Hitomi, Jang Won-young, Kim Do-ah and Kim Na-young) are declared the winners of the concept evaluation, resulting in a total benefit of 130,000 votes (20,000 per member and 50,000 for the first in the group). To Reach You group came in 2nd, Rumor came in 3rd, See You Again group came in 4th, 1000% group came in 5th and I AM group came in last. All six groups performed on MCountdown.
11	"Episode 11"	August 24, 2018
Amidst the eliminations, the girls undergo make-up lessons, attend a therapy session to share about their current feelings with the special participation of Bora. They are also asked to pick a contestant that they would've voted as producers with Yuehua's Choi Yena taking 1st place and Pledis Entertainment's Lee Ga-eun and Woollim Entertainment's Kwon Eunbi taking 2nd and 3rd place, respectively. At the elimination, Lee Seung-gi reveals that only 20 trainees will advance to the final stage. Miyazaki Miho, Kang Hye-won, Lee Chae-yeon and Miyawaki Sakura are called up as the contenders for 1st, revealing Miyawaki Sakura as the first place. The contenders for 20th place are then called up: FNC Entertainment's Park Hae-yoon and Banana Culture's Kim Na-young. Park Hae-yoon survives from being eliminated. With the top 20 confirmed, Lee Seung-gi announces the next and final mission: the debut song evaluation. He introduces "We Together" (produced by Han Sung-soo, Pledis Entertainment's producer) and "You're in love, right? (produced by Akimoto Yasushi, AKB48's producer) as the final line-up's debut songs. He explains that they will be split into two teams of 10, each team composed of one main vocal and nine sub vocals. The girls choose their positions beginning with rank 20 up to 1, with the higher ranked girls being given the advantage of replacing the lower ranked girls and bumping them into another position. After positions are confirmed, the girls begin practicing the choreography and memorizing the lyrics in preparation for the final stage.
12	"Episode 12"	August 31, 2018
The episode begins showing the girls' audition tapes, as well as their final confessional interviews. Throughout the episode, the trainees currently ranked and aiming for the 12th are revealed to encourage people to vote. The debut evaluation starts off with the eliminated trainees joining the top 20 for a performance of "You're Mine". Lee Seung-gi then reveals the group name as Iz*One. The episode then flashes back to the guerilla concert held by the top 20 girls in Japan, where they performed the theme song from the show, with NGT48's Yamada Noe acting as the MC. The episode also shows the last preparations for the two final songs, showing the clip for the two contenders for center position and announcing the final center on stage. WM Entertainment's Lee Chae-yeon is chosen for "We Together" and Yuehua Entertainment's Choi Ye-na for "You're in Love, Right?". Lee Seung-gi had also showed the contenders for 12th position during the live voting which were Takeuchi Miyu, Kim Chaewon, Han Cho-won and Honda Hitomi. The girls are also showed recording a final song sang by all the top 20 trainees titled "While Dreaming", with lyrics describing their journey through the show. The trainees share their final thanks to the trainers and also watch their audition tapes, and finally, reading letters they had written to themselves from earlier episodes. Voting soon comes to a close, and ranking announcements begin. The ranking announcement started from the contestant who ranked at 11th place which was Urban Work's Kim Min-ju followed by Woolim's Kim Chaewon at 10th, AKB48's Honda Hitomi at 9th, 8D Creative's Kang Hye-won at 8th, Woolim's Kwon Eun-bi at 7th, HKT48's Yabuki Nako at 6th, Starship's Ahn Yu-jin at 5th, Yuehua's Choi Ye-na at 4th, and Stone Music's Jo Yu-ri at 3rd, confirming them for debut. Then, HKT48's Miyawaki Sakura and Starship's Jang Won-young are called up as contenders for 1st, with Won-young taking the first place, confirming her position as Iz One's center. The contenders for 12th place were Cube's Han Cho-won, Pledis' Lee Ga-eun, AKB48's Miyazaki Miho and WM's Lee Chae-yeon. It was then announced that the 12th and final spot for Iz*One went to Lee Chae-yeon.

== Ranking ==
The top 12 contestants were chosen through popularity online voting (open internationally) at Produce 2020's homepage and audience's live voting. The results were shown at the end of each episode. This ranking determined the 12 trainees who would form the unit girl group.

Color key

New Top 12

Produce 48 Top 12
No.	Ep.1	Ep.2	Ep.3	Ep.5	Ep.8	Ep.9	Ep.11	Ep.12
1	Sakura Miyawaki	Lee Ga-eun ↑4	Lee Ga-eun =	Lee Ga-eun =	Jang Won-young ↑2	Miho Miyazaki ↑24	Sakura Miyawaki ↑1	Jang Won-young ↑6
2	Ahn Yu-jin	Ahn Yu-jin =	Ahn Yu-jin =	Ahn Yu-jin =	Nako Yabuki ↑5	Sakura Miyawaki ↑5	Miho Miyazaki ↓1	Sakura Miyawaki ↓1
3	Jang Won-young	Kwon Eun-bi ↑22	Sakura Miyawaki ↑2	Jang Won-young ↑1	Kang Hye-won ↑22	Kang Hye-won =	Lee Chae-yeon ↑9	Jo Yu-ri ↑15
4	Jurina Matsui	Jang Won-young ↓1	Jang Won-young =	Sakura Miyawaki ↓1	Ahn Yu-jin ↓2	Miyu Takeuchi ↑26	Kang Hye-won ↓1	Choi Ye-na ↑12
5	Lee Ga-eun	Sakura Miyawaki ↓4	Kwon Eun-bi ↓2	Kwon Eun-bi =	Kwon Eun-bi =	Lee Ga-eun ↑3	Lee Ga-eun =	Ahn Yu-jin ↑9
6	Jang Gyu-ri	Choi Ye-na ↑1	Moe Goto ↑2	Moe Goto =	Kim Min-ju ↑9	Miu Shitao ↑16	Miyu Takeuchi ↓2	Nako Yabuki ↑3
7	Choi Ye-na	Wang Yi-ren ↑4	Choi Ye-na ↓1	Nako Yabuki ↑9	Sakura Miyawaki ↓3	Nako Yabuki ↓5	Jang Won-young ↑1	Kwon Eun-bi ↑5
8	Lee Si-an	Moe Goto ↑8	Miyu Takeuchi ↑3	Wang Yi-ren ↑1	Lee Ga-eun ↓7	Jang Won-young ↓7	Miru Shiroma ↑6	Kang Hye-won ↓4
9	Miru Shiroma	Noe Yamada ↑36	Wang Yi-ren ↓2	Choi Ye-na ↓2	Han Cho-won ↑38	Hitomi Honda ↑3	Nako Yabuki ↓2	Hitomi Honda ↑2
10	Jo Yu-ri	Lee Chae-yeon ↑19	Lee Chae-yeon =	Lee Chae-yeon =	Jo Yu-ri ↑9	Ahn Yu-jin ↓6	Miu Shitao ↓4	Kim Chaewon ↑9
11	Wang Yi-ren	Miyu Takeuchi ↑28	Noe Yamada ↓2	Miyu Takeuchi ↓3	Huh Yunjin ↑11	Kwon Eun-bi ↓6	Hitomi Honda ↓2	Kim Min-ju ↑4
12	Mako Kojima	Jurina Matsui ↓8	Jurina Matsui =	Hitomi Honda ↑10	Hitomi Honda =	Lee Chae-yeon ↑5	Kwon Eun-bi ↓1	Lee Chae-yeon ↓9

=== Result ===
The finale was held on August 31, 2018, and was broadcast live. Lee Seung-gi announced the unit girl group name, IZ*ONE (아이즈원).

#	Episode 12 (Total votes)		
#	Name	Votes	Company
1	Jang Won-young	338,366	Starship
2	Sakura Miyawaki	316,105	HKT48
3	Jo Yu-ri	294,734	Stone Music
4	Choi Ye-na	285,385	Yuehua
5	Ahn Yu-jin	280,487	Starship
6	Nako Yabuki	261,788	HKT48
7	Kwon Eun-bi	250,212	Woollim
8	Kang Hye-won	248,432	8D Creative
9	Hitomi Honda	240,418	AKB48
10	Kim Chaewon	238,192	Woollim
11	Kim Min-ju	227,061	Urban Works
12	Lee Chae-yeon	221,273	WM

== Discography ==
=== Extended plays ===
Title	Details	Peak chart positions			Sales
Title	Details	JPN Hot	JPN Dig	US World	Sales
30 Girls 6 Concepts	Released: August 18, 2018; Label: Stone Music Entertainment; Formats: Digital download	14	7	9	JPN: 2,473
Produce 48 – Final	Released: September 1, 2018; Label: Stone Music Entertainment; Formats: Digital download	22	—	—	

=== Singles ===
Title	Year	Peak positions			Album
Title	Year	KOR	KOR Hot 100	JPN Hot 100	Album
"Pick Me" (내꺼야; Nekkoya)	2018	— (Note: "Nekkoya (Pick Me)" did not enter the Gaon Digital Chart, but peaked at number 55 on the Mobile Chart and number 100 on the BGM Chart.)	—	— (Note: "Nekkoya (Pick Me)" did not enter the Japan Hot 100, but peaked at number 56 on the Japan Hot 100 Download Chart.)	Non-album single
"Rollin' Rollin'"	2018	66	66	—	30 Girls 6 Concepts
"To Reach You" (너에게 닿기를)	2018	57	61	—	30 Girls 6 Concepts
"Rumor"	2018	24	37	—	30 Girls 6 Concepts
"See You Again" (다시 만나)	2018	80	79	—	30 Girls 6 Concepts
"1000%"	2018	70	68	—	30 Girls 6 Concepts
"I Am"	2018	92	90	—	30 Girls 6 Concepts
"We Together" (앞으로 잘 부탁해)	2018	— (Note: "We Together" did not enter the Gaon Digital Chart, but peaked at number 94 on the Download Chart.)	—	—	Produce 48 – Final
"Suki ni Nacchau Darō?" (好きになっちゃうだろう？)	2018	— (Note: "Suki ni Nacchau Darō?" did not enter the Gaon Digital Chart, but peaked at number 91 on the Download Chart.)	—	—	Produce 48 – Final
"Yume wo Miteiru Aida" (꿈을 꾸는 동안) (Korean version)	2018	— (Note: "Yume wo Miteiru Aida (Korean Version)" did not enter the Gaon Digital Chart, but peaked at number 80 on the Download Chart.)	—	—	Produce 48 – Final
"Yume wo Miteiru Aida" (夢を見ている間) (Japanese version)	2018	—	—	—	Produce 48 – Final
"—" denotes releases that did not chart or were not released in that territory.

== Ratings ==
In the table below, the blue numbers represent the lowest ratings and the red numbers represent the highest ratings.

Ep.	Broadcast date	Average audience share	
Ep.	Broadcast date	AGB Nielsen	
Ep.	Broadcast date	Nationwide	Seoul
1	June 15, 2018	1.132%	NR
2	June 22, 2018	1.913%	1.768%
3	June 29, 2018	1.999%	2.098%
4	July 6, 2018	2.833%	3.068%
5	July 13, 2018	2.538%	2.732%
6	July 20, 2018	2.479%	3.080%
7	July 27, 2018	2.075%	2.266%
8	August 3, 2018	2.397%	2.399%
9	August 10, 2018	2.561%	2.790%
10	August 17, 2018	2.594%	3.087%
11	August 24, 2018	2.435%	2.556%
12	August 31, 2018	3.085%	3.299%
Average		2.338%	

- NR rating means "not reported". The rating is low.

== Aftermath ==
- Iz*One released their debut extended play (EP) Color*Iz on October 29, 2018. Since then, they have released two studio albums (one in Korean and one in Japanese), four EPs and three Japanese singles. After two and a half years of activities, Iz*One disbanded on April 29, 2021, following their contract expiration.
  - Hitomi Honda returned to activities with AKB48 until her graduation on January 28, 2024. She later signed with iNKODE and debuted in their new girl group Say My Name on October 16, 2024, with their first mini album of the same name.
  - Nako Yabuki returned to HKT48 until her graduation on April 1, 2023, to focus on her acting career.
  - Kwon Eun-bi debuted as a soloist on August 24, 2021, with her first EP, Open.
  - Jo Yu-ri debuted as a soloist on October 7, 2021, with her first single album, Glassy. She made her acting debut in 2022 by playing Oh-Rosi in the TV mini series Mimicus. She went on to play Kim Jun-hee, also known as Player 222, in seasons 2 and 3 ^{(2024-25)} of the TV series Squid Game.
  - Kim Min-ju and Urban Works announced in October 2021 that she would focus on her acting career. She later left Urban Works and signed with Management SOOP in September 2022.
  - Jang Won-young and An Yu-jin debuted in Starship Entertainment's new girl group Ive with their first single album, Eleven, on December 1, 2021.
  - Kang Hye-won debuted as a soloist on December 22 with her first extended play, W. She also debuted as an actress in the third season of web drama Best Mistake, which began airing on December 28.
  - Choi Ye-na starred in the second season of the web drama The World of My 17 and hosted several variety shows. She debuted as a soloist on January 17, 2022, with her first mini-album, Smiley.
  - Sakura Miyawaki and Kim Chaewon (alongside former Pledis Entertainment trainee Huh Yunjin) signed with Hybe and Source Music and debuted in their new girl group Le Sserafim on May 2, 2022, with their first mini album, Fearless. Miyawaki had graduated from HKT48 and held her graduation concert on June 19, 2021, while Chae-won had left Woollim Entertainment. Although their signing was reported by external outlets in mid-2021, their status as Source artists was confirmed in March 2022.
  - Lee Chae-yeon competed on Street Woman Fighter as part of the WANT dance crew. She debuted as a soloist with her first EP, Hush Rush, on October 12, 2022. She then competed on Queendom Puzzle but withdrew before the show's premiere.
Other contestants
- Other 48 Group members returned to their respective groups and continued with releasing singles and music videos, including "No Way Man," "Mimi wo Fusage!" and "Wakariyasukute Gomen".
  - "NO WAY MAN" was a normal AKB48 single and included Produce48 winners Honda Hitomi, Miyawaki Sakura and Yabuki Nako in addition to the other four Japanese finalists Miyazaki Miho, Takeuchi Miyu, Shiato Miu, and Shiroma Miru. The single also featured Tanaka Miku, who resigned from the show, along with other AKB48 group members. "Wakariyasukute Gomen", one of the single's B-Sides, featured members of the AKB48 groups that made it past the 1st elimination round but were eliminated before the finals (their ranks varied from 22nd to 52nd). The other B-side from the singe, "Mimi wo Fusage!", was performed by Japanese contestants who were eliminated in the first round of voting (ranks varied from 59th to 91st), not including those who resigned.
  - AKB48's Minami Sato (39th) was promoted from Kenkyusei to team A on September 12, 2019.
  - AKB48's Erii Chiba (33rd) participated in the Mnet reality TV show "UHSN".
  - AKB48's Miu Shitao (18th), Erii Chiba (33rd), Nanami Asai (42nd), and Serika Nagano (77th) participated in OUT OF 48.
- Some trainees returned to their original groups or set to debut in rookie groups by their respective agencies:
  - Stone Music's Jang Gyu-ri (25th) returned as a member of Fromis 9 for their first single album From.9 on October 10, 2018 & departed from the group after her original contract with Off The Record Entertainment expired on July 31, 2022.
  - FNC's Park Hae-yoon (19th) debuted in girl group Cherry Bullet on January 21, 2019.
  - Music Works's Yoon Hae-sol (35th) debuted in girl group Aqua on November 16, 2018. The group is said to have quietly disbanded.
  - FENT's Kim Do-ah (23rd) debuted in Flavor, the first sub-unit of girl group FANATICS, on November 26, 2018, and the full group on August 6, 2019.
  - Yuehua Entertainment's Kim Si-hyeon (ranked 27) and Wang Yi-ren (ranked 28) debuted in the girl group Everglow on March 18, 2019.
  - Woollim's Kim So-hee (43rd) & Kim Su-yun (47th), and former AKB48 member Juri Takahashi (16th) debuted in girl group Rocket Punch on August 7, 2019.
  - Individual trainee Park Jinny (69th) joined Vine Entertainment and debuted in girl group Secret Number on May 19, 2020.
  - RBW's Na Goeun (29th) and Park Jieun (80th) debuted in girl group Purple Kiss on March 15, 2021. Ji-eun left the group on November 18, 2022.
  - Han Chowon (13th) debuted in Cube Entertainment's girl group Lightsum alongside former Banana Culture trainee Kim Nayoung (21st), and former CNC Entertainment trainee Lee Yujeong (51st) on June 10, 2021.
  - A Team's Kim Choyeon (50th) and former Million Market trainee Son Eunchae (32nd) debuted in girl group BugAboo on October 25, 2021. The group disbanded on December 8, 2022. After the group's disbandment both Kim Choyeon and Son Eunchae left A Team and joined Carrie TV.
- Some trainees debuted as soloists:
  - ZB Label's Alex Christine (82nd) debuted as a soloist under the moniker AleXa, and released her debut single Bomb on October 21, 2019.
  - (Former) AKB48's Miyu Takeuchi (17th) released a solo single, My Type (내 타입) on October 22, 2019, under Mystic Entertainment.
  - Park Seoyoung (55th) debuted as a soloist under the moniker ROYA, and released her debut single Butterfly on May 9, 2020.
  - (Former) NMB48's Miru Shiroma (20th) released her debut single, Shine Bright, on July 6, 2022, under Universal Music Japan.
  - Kim Do-ah (23rd) debuted as a soloist on May 23, 2023 with the digital single "Dream Walking".
- Some trainees left their agencies/joined new agencies:
  - NMB48's Azusa Uemura (left) graduated on December 3, 2018, and began her career as a YouTuber.
  - AKB48's Miyu Takeuchi (17th) graduated on December 25, 2018. She then signed a contract with Mystic Entertainment before leaving on May 3, 2021.
  - AKB48's Juri Takahashi (16th) graduated from the group on May 2, 2019. She then signed a contract with Woollim Entertainment and debuted in Rocket Punch. She departed from the group after her original contract expired on May 24, 2024.
  - AKB48's Mako Kojima (34th) graduated on May 12, 2019.
  - NGT48's Rena Hasegawa (71st) graduated on May 19, 2019. She then signed a contract with Crocodile and began her career as a voice actress.
  - AKB48's Ikumi Nakano (59th) graduated on May 30, 2019.
  - NMB48's Kokoro Naiki (87th) graduated on August 11, 2019.
  - AKB48's Moe Goto (24th) graduated on August 13, 2019. She then signed a contract with Twin Planet and debuted as a soloist.
  - HKT48's Amane Tsukiashi (left) graduated on March 31, 2020.
  - NMB48's Sae Murase (22nd) graduated on December 23, 2020.
  - SKE48's Jurina Matsui (left) graduated on April 30, 2021.
  - NMB48's Miru Shiroma (20th) graduated on August 31, 2021.
  - NGT48's Noe Yamada (41st) graduated on February 28, 2022.
  - HKT48's Mina Imada (76th) graduated on April 4, 2022.
  - NMB48's Cocona Umeyama (left) graduated on April 4, 2022.
  - AKB48's Miho Miyazaki (15th) graduated on April 14, 2022, announcing that she plans on moving to South Korea.
  - HKT48's Natsumi Matsuoka (67th) graduated on August 31, 2022.
  - HKT48's Bibian Murakawa (45th) graduated on November 1, 2022.
  - AKB48's Tomu Muto (38th) graduated on March 8, 2023.
  - HKT48's Aoi Motomura (52nd) graduated on July 23, 2023.
  - NMB48's Yuuka Kato (74th) graduated on August 1, 2023.
  - AKB48's Chiyori Nakanishi (37th) graduated on August 28, 2023.
  - AKB48's Manami Ichikawa (81st) graduated on August 31, 2023.
  - HKT48's Miku Tanaka (left) graduated on December 29, 2023.
  - AKB48's Shinobu Mogi (63rd) graduated on January 19, 2024.
  - AKB48's Nanami Asai (42nd) graduated on January 31, 2024.
  - AKB48's Ayana Shinozaki (91st) graduated on February 10, 2024.
  - AKB48's Erina Oda (64th) graduated on April 23, 2024.
  - AKB48's Minami Sato (39th) graduated on July 1, 2024.
  - HKT48's Misaki Aramaki (49th) graduated on December 27, 2024.
  - Hwang So-yeon (60th) and Kang Da-min (62nd) left Wellmade Yedang, then Hwang signed a contract with M&H Entertainment while Kang is now under Starship Entertainment.
  - Lee Ga-eun (14th) left After School and Pledis Entertainment and released her final single under Pledis, "Remember You," on July 12, 2019. Lee then signed a contract with High Entertainment.
  - Go Yu-jin (31st) left Blockberry Creative, then she signed a contract with 8D Creative before leaving in spring 2020.
  - Son Eun-chae (32nd) left Million Market and signed with A Team Entertainment before debuting with BugAboo on October 25, 2021.
  - Lee Yu-jeong (51st), Yoon Eun-bin (65th), Kim Da-yeon (70th) and Hong Ye-ji (78th) left CNC Entertainment, then signed with Stardium Entertainment. Both Lee Yujeong and Kim Dayeon then left Stardium Entertainment; Lee signed with Cube Entertainment in December 2019 and debuted in Lightsum, while Kim signed with Jellyfish Entertainment.
  - Shin Su-hyun (61st) left FAVE Entertainment. She then signed with Sublime Artist Agency.
  - Cho Ah-yeong (72nd) left FNC Entertainment. She then signed a contract with UPVOTE Entertainment.
  - Kim Da-hye (75th) and Kim Nayoung left Banana Culture. Kim Nayoung then signed with Cube Entertainment and debuted in Lightsum.
  - Yu Min-young (54th) left HOW Entertainment and signed a contract with 8D Creative.
  - Lee Chae-jeong (79th) and Park Minji (53rd) left MND17. Lee signed with Hunus Entertainment and was added as a new member to girl group Elris for their fourth extended play Jackpot. Park signed with Vine Entertainment and joined Secret Number as a new member, making her debut with their single album Fire Saturday on October 27, 2021.
  - Kim Yu-bin (88th) left CNC Entertainment. She then signed a contract with MAJOR9 Entertainment and debuted in Bling Bling.
  - Kim Minseo (44th) and Wang Ke (56th) left HOW Entertainment following its closure.
  - Cho Yeongjin (84th) and Lee Seunghyeon (73rd) left WM Entertainment. Lee joined Grandline Group and debuted in the group H1-KEY on January 5, 2022, under the stage name Riina.
  - Huh Yunjin (26th) left Pledis Entertainment. She later joined Hybe and Source Music, where she debuted with their girl group Le Sserafim alongside former Iz*One members Sakura Miyawaki and Kim Chaewon on May 2, 2022.
- Some trainees participated in other survival shows:
  - Kim Do-ah (23rd) and Kim Da-yeon (70th) participated in the audition program Girls Planet 999. Kim Da-yeon placed fourth, making her debut with Kep1er under Wake One Entertainment and Swing Entertainment.
  - Juri Takahashi (16th), Miru Shiroma (20th), Kim Suyun (47th), and Lee Seunghyeon (73th) participated in Queendom Puzzle.
  - Wang Ke (56th) participated in the Thai audition program Chuang Asia: Thailand. She placed 6th in the finale and will make her debut as part of Gen1es

=== Vote manipulation investigation ===
Following allegations of electoral fraud on the final episode of Produce X 101, 272 viewers filed a lawsuit against Mnet. On August 20, 2019, a search warrant was issued on CJ E&M offices and a text voting company by the Seoul Metropolitan Police Agency. During their first search, the police uncovered voice recordings of the staff members discussing vote manipulation on the previous seasons of the show, resulting in them extending their investigation to all four seasons of the Produce 101 series and Idol School. On November 6, 2019, producers Ahn Joon-young and Kim Yong-bum were arrested. During questioning, Ahn admitted to having manipulated the rankings for Produce 48 and Produce X 101. Police also found that Ahn had been using services from adult entertainment establishments in Gangnam paid for by various talent agencies approximately 40 times beginning from the second half of 2018, estimating to ₩100 million. On November 7, 2019, the police revealed that the final rankings of the top 20 trainees during Produce 48 and Produce X 101 had already been predetermined by the producers before the final performances were recorded and broadcast. On November 18, 2020, the trial of appeals was held for the "Produce 101" series manipulation case. The court revealed that the fourth round of voting of the show was manipulated, with trainees Lee Gaeun (14th) and Han Chowon (13th) supposed to be in the 5th and 6th place, respectively.
