= BugAboo =

South Korean girl group

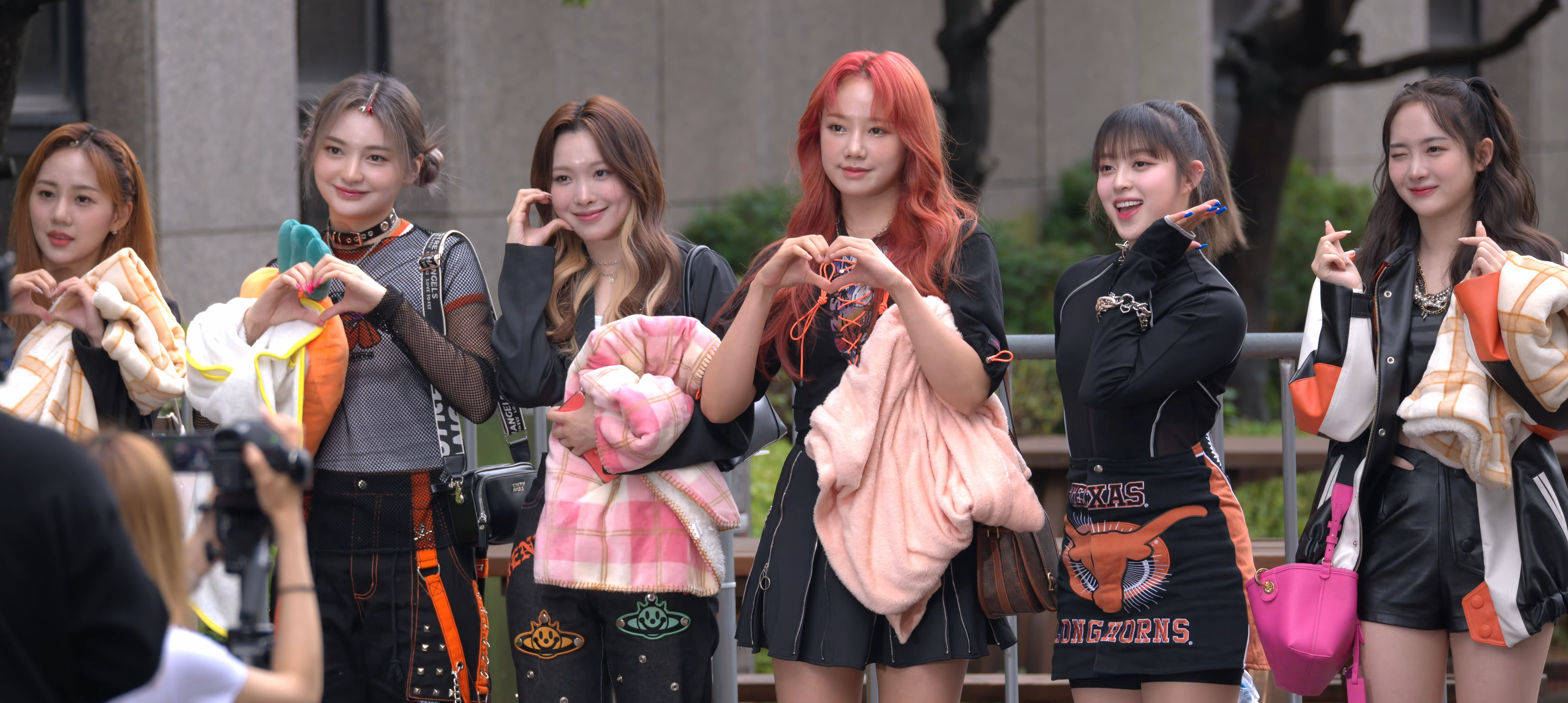
- BugAboo in July 2022; L–R: Eunchae, Choyeon, Rainie, Zin, Yoona, Cyan

Background information
- Origin: Seoul, South Korea
- Genre: K-pop
- Years active: 2021–2022
- Labels: A Team; JG Star
- Past members: Eunchae; Yoona; Rainie; Cyan; Choyeon; Zin
- Website: Official website

BugAboo (/ˈbʌɡəbuː/; Korean: 버가부; RR: Beogabu, commonly stylized as bugAboo) was a South Korean girl group formed and managed by A Team Entertainment, a past subsidiary of JYP Entertainment. The group was composed of six members: Eunchae, Yoona, Rainie, Cyan, Choyeon, and Zin. The group made their debut on October 25, 2021, with the release of their eponymous single album. After a year and two months of activities, the group officially disbanded on December 8, 2022.

== Name ==
The name BugAboo represents a fearful and surprising existence in the imagination, containing determination and saying "Let's overcome the fearful existence in our hearts together and realize our dreams". It was also revealed by A Team that the name was also inspired by Peek-a-boo.

== History ==
=== 2018–2021: Pre-debut activities ===
In 2018, Eunchae (then representing Million Market) and Choyeon competed in Produce 48, finishing 32nd and 50th, respectively. In September 2020, Cyan had starred in VAV's music video for Made for Two. It was revealed in an interview with Ryan S. Jhun, the group's producer and CEO of A Team Entertainment, that BugAboo was originally scheduled to debut in 2020, but it was postponed and then moved to the fall of 2021. The group went by the tentative name A Team Dream, and they covered songs on their now-defunct YouTube channel.

=== 2021–2022: Introduction, BugAboo, Pop and disbandment ===
The group released an official logo motion teaser and a silhouette teaser on September 1, 2021, announcing their debut in October 2021. BugAboo was the first group to make their debut under the company in six years, following the debut of their first boy group VAV. Two days prior to the release, they held a special debut showcase called Prick or BugAboo, which was live telecast on SBS MTV. On October 25, 2021, the group released their self-titled debut single album BugAboo.

On June 13, 2022, BugAboo released their second single album, Pop. On December 8, 2022, A Team Entertainment shared that after long discussions, the company and the members had decided to disband the group and terminate the contracts of all members.

== Members ==
- Choyeon (초연) – leader
- Eunchae (은채)
- Yoona (유우나)
- Rainie (레이니)
- Cyan (시안)
- Zin (지인)

== Discography ==
=== Single albums ===
List of single albums, showing selected details, selected chart positions, and sales figures
Title	Details	Peak chart positions	Sales
Title	Details	KOR	Sales
BugAboo	Released: October 25, 2021; Label: A Team Entertainment, Kakao Entertainment; Formats: CD, digital download, streaming; Track listing: 1. "BugAboo"; 2. "All Night Play"; 3. "BugAboo" (Instrumental)	42	KOR: 6,481
Pop	Released: June 13, 2022; Label: A Team Entertainment, Kakao Entertainment; Formats: CD, digital download, streaming; Track listing: 1. "Pop"; 2. "Easy Move"; 3. "Pop" (Instrumental)	46	KOR: 1,324

=== Singles ===
List of singles, showing year released, selected peak positions, sales figures, and name of the album
Title	Year	Peak chart positions	Album
Title	Year	KOR Down.	Album
"BugAboo"	2021	—	BugAboo
"Pop"	2022	86	Pop
"—" denotes a recording that did not chart or was not released in that territory

== Videography ==
=== Music video ===
Year	Title	Director	Ref.
2021	"BugAboo"	Purple Straw Film	
2022	"Pop"	Sunny Visual	
