= Secret Number =

South Korean girl group

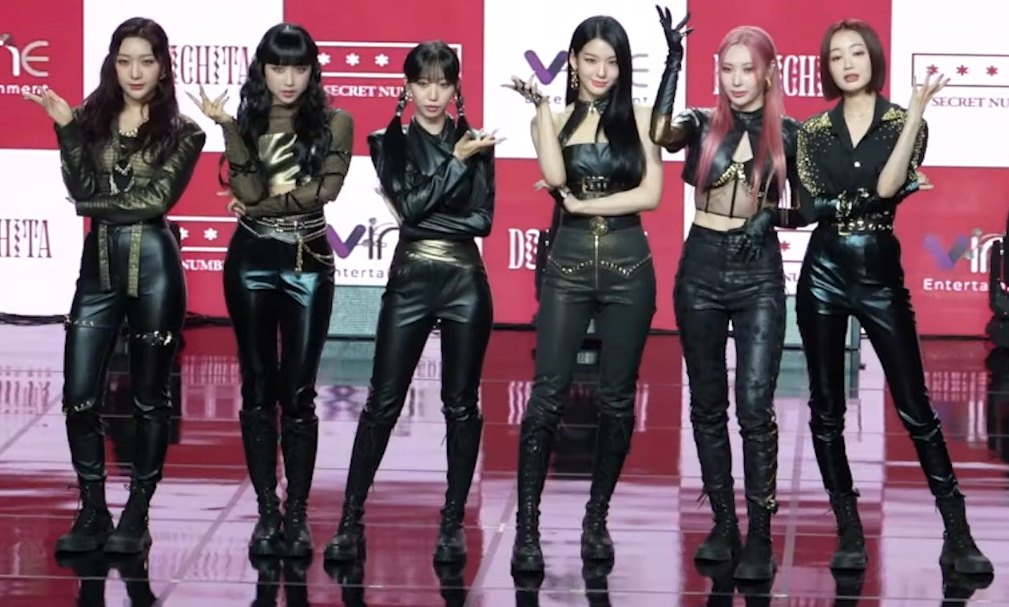
- Secret Number in June 2022; L–R: Minji, Dita, Zuu, Soodam, Jinny, and Léa

Background information
- Origin: Seoul, South Korea
- Genres: K-pop
- Years active: 2020–present
- Label: Vine Entertainment
- Members: Navi; Dinda; Ebin; Min C
- Past members: Léa; Dita; Jinny; Minji; Soodam; Zuu; Denise
- Website: Official website

Secret Number (Korean: 시크릿넘버; stylized in all-caps) is a South Korean girl group formed by Vine Entertainment. The current lineup consists of four members: Navi, Dinda, Ebin, and Min C.

Originally consisting of Léa, Dita, Jinny, Soodam, and Denise, the group debuted on May 19, 2020, with the single album Who Dis?. They would release another single album, Got That Boom, on November 4. Following Denise's indefinite hiatus due to contract disputes, eventually departing the group on February 5, 2022, Minji and Zuu would join the group in October, 2021, and released the single album Fire Saturday (on October 27), followed with Doomchita (on June 8, 2022), and Tap (on November 16). In 2023, Secret Number released their first Japanese extended play (EP) Like It Like It, with the single of the same name (on April 5), followed by two single albums Doxa (on May 24) and Starlight (on August 16).

Léa, Dita, Jinny, and Minji left the group in April 2025, following the expiration of their contracts. Navi, Dinda, Ebin and Min C would join the group on August 14, and released the single album Don't Touch on August 19. Soodam left the group in December 2025, following the expiration of her contract. In April 2026, Zuu left the group following the expiration of her contract.

== Name ==
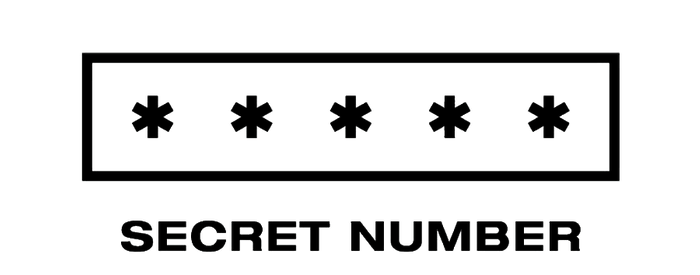
Secret Number's official logo

According to the group, their name means that "Everyone has a secret number [for a password or PIN code], which is usually a birthday, anniversary, or some other special number. We want to hold such special meaning in public. Our logo is designed like a password box with five stars, representing the five of us."

== History ==
=== 2011–2020: Pre-debut activities ===
Léa was previously a member of Singaporean-South Korean girl group Skarf between 2011 and 2014 under the stage name Hana. She later participated in Mix Nine under her birth name Mizuki Ogawa in 2017 where she finished in 109th place.

Jinny was previously a trainee under YG Entertainment between 2013 and 2017. She later participated in Produce 48 where she finished in 69th place.

Minji previously participated in the survival program Produce 101 but was eliminated in episode 5, and like Jinny, Minji also participated in Produce 48 and finished in 53rd place

Soodam was once a member of a traditional dance group Little Angels Children's Folk Ballet of Korea

Denise previously participated in a Korean reality television show competition titled K-pop Star 5 and became a member of the Mazinga S unit. Then, in May 2016, Denise became a YG Entertainment trainee for 2 years and chose to leave.

On March 12, 2020, Vine Entertainment announced that the group was initially scheduled for debut on March 26, 2020, however there was a push back due to COVID-19 pandemic.

=== 2020–2021: Introduction, debut with Who Dis?, Got That Boom, Fire Saturday, and new members ===
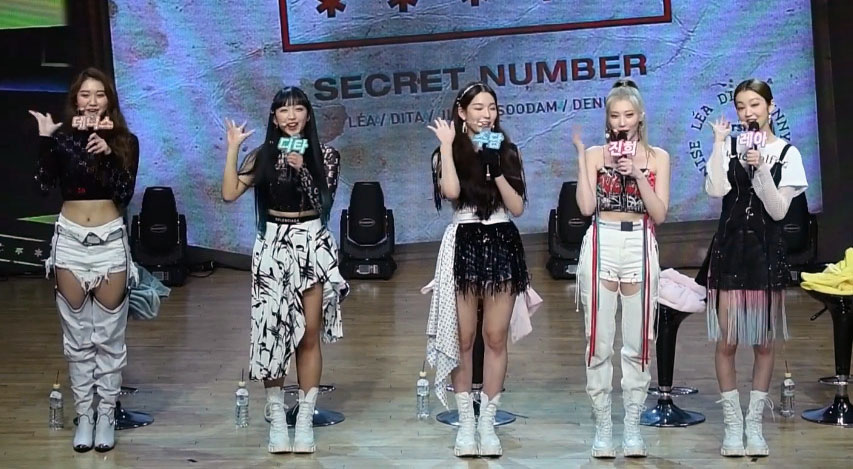
Secret Number at Who Dis? debut showcase on May 19, 2020.

On April 29, 2020, the members were revealed in a dance cover video published on YouTube along with the group name Secret Number. On May 6, 2020, Vine Entertainment announced that Secret Number would release their debut single album Who Dis? on May 19. The members were officially introduced individually from May 11 to 14 (in order: Jinny, Léa, Soodam, Dita, and Denise). The debut single album consisting of two tracks, lead single "Who Dis?" and "Holiday", was released on May 19. The group made their broadcast debut on KBS2's Music Bank on May 22 where they performed their lead single "Who Dis?". On May 23, it was announced that the music video "Who Dis?" has more than 5 million views.

On October 22, 2020, Vine Entertainment announced that Secret Number would release their second single album Got That Boom on November 4. The single album, consisting of two tracks, lead single "Got That Boom" and "Privacy", was released on November 4.

Secret Number's commercial success in their first five months earned them several rookie awards at major Korean year-end music award shows, including the Asia Artist Awards, APAN Music Awards, and Asian Pop Music Awards. Additionally, Billboard Korea named them as one of the Rookie K-pop Groups of 2020.

On September 30, 2021, Vine Entertainment announced through their Instagram account that Denise would not be participating in the group's upcoming third album promotions due to contract negotiation matters.

On October 8, 2021, Vine Entertainment announced that Secret Number would release their third single album Fire Saturday on October 27. On October 16, Zuu was introduced as a new member of Secret Number. A day later, Minji was introduced as the second new member.

=== 2022–2023: Denise's departure, Doomchita, and Japanese debut ===
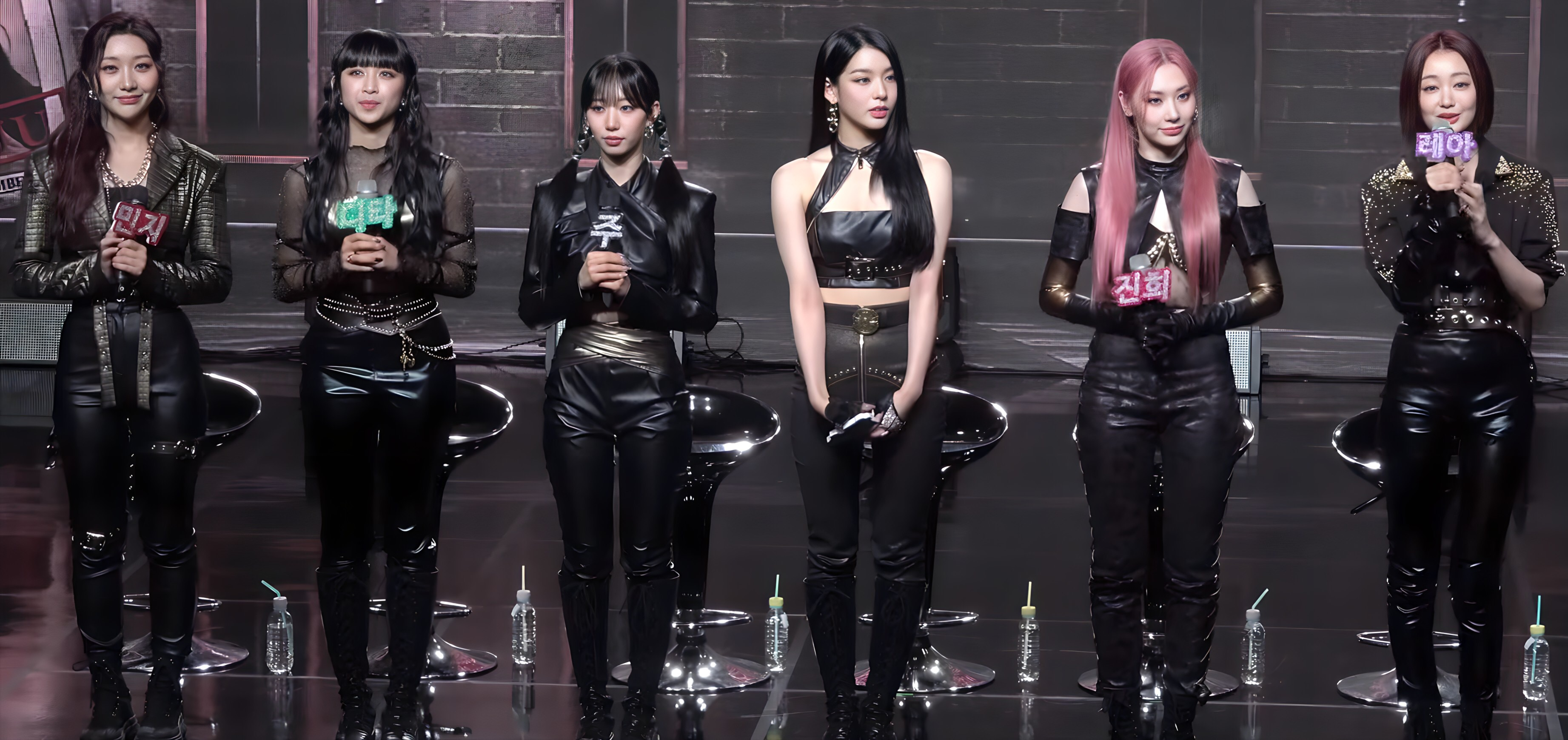
Secret Number at the showcase event for the 4th single album 'Doomchita', on June 8 2022.

On February 5, 2022, Denise announced her departure from the group and Vine Entertainment on her Instagram account.

On May 12, 2022, Vine Entertainment announced that Secret Number would release their fourth single album Doomchita on June 8.

On August 5, 2022, Secret Number entered into an exclusive cooperation contract agreement with the company SP & Co., Ltd. for promotion and distribution in Japan

On November 9, 2022, Vine Entertainment announced that Secret Number would release their fifth single album Tap on November 16.

On March 3, 2023, Secret Number released their Japanese debut single "Like It Like It" digitally. It was also announced that the extended play of the same name containing six tracks, including the Japanese debut single, would be released on April 5, 2023. On May 24, 2023, Secret Number released their sixth single album entitled Doxa. And three months later, namely on August 16, 2023, through their social media accounts, Secret Number released their seventh single album entitled Starlight.

On August 31, 2023, Dita was selected as the ambassador for bilateral relations between Indonesia and South Korea, and was inaugurated by the Indonesian ambassador to South Korea, Gandi Sulistiyanto.

On September 25, 2023, Vine Entertainment cooperate with the platform Koong to release a special NFT album Love, Bye performed by Dita, Jinny, and Minji.

=== 2024–present: US debut tour, first solo concert, members' departure and lineup changes ===
In early 2024, Secret Number announced their debut concert tour in the United States through Studio PAV as promoter titled Unlock. They visited eight cities chosen by polls, starting from Chicago on July 26, 2024, and ending in Los Angeles on August 10. On September 28, 2024, Vine Entertainment collaborated with Chan Entertainment and Tiptip as promoters to hold their first solo concert titled Passworld in Indonesia, which was held at Tennis Indoor Senayan, Jakarta.

On April 2, 2025, Léa left the group after contract expiration. The next day, three other members Dita, Jinny, and Minji also left the group after the contract expired.

On August 14, 2025, Ebin, Min C, Dinda, and Nabi officially joined the group. On August 8, 2025, the group dropped a "coming soon" teaser on their official social media channels, hinting at their upcoming comeback.

On August 12, 2025, it was announced that the group would be releasing their eighth single album "Don't Touch" on August 19.

On December 11, 2025, Soodam exited the group after contract expiration. She was the final member of the original lineup to do so, leaving it with no founding members.

On April 8, 2026, Zuu exited the group following her contract expiration.

== Endorsements ==
On October 5, 2020, Dita was announced as the brand ambassador for global cosmetic brand Nacific Indonesia, while in April 2024, she was chosen to be the ambassador for the health product brand Femmy Fyber.

== Members ==
- Navi (나비)
- Dinda (딘다)
- Ebin (에빈)
- Min C (민씨)

=== Former members ===
- Léa (레아) – vocalist, rapper
- Dita (디타) – dancer, vocalist
- Jinny (진희) – rapper
- Minji (민지) – vocalist
- Soodam (수담) – vocalist
- Zuu (주) – vocalist
- Denise (데니스) – vocalist

== Discography ==
=== Extended plays ===
List of extended plays, showing selected details
Title	Details
Like It Like It	Released: April 5, 2023 (JPN); Label: SPC Music; Formats: CD, digital download, streaming

=== Single albums ===
List of single albums, showing selected details, selected chart positions, and sales figures
Title	Details	Peak chart positions	Sales
Title	Details	KOR	Sales
Who Dis?	Released: May 19, 2020; Label: Vine Entertainment; Formats: CD, digital download, streaming; Track listing: 1. "Who Dis?"; 2. "Holiday"	19	KOR: 6,178
Got That Boom	Released: November 4, 2020; Label: Vine Entertainment; Formats: CD, digital download, streaming; Track listing: 1. "Got That Boom"; 2. "Privacy"	20	KOR: 6,979
Fire Saturday	Released: October 27, 2021; Label: Vine Entertainment; Formats: CD, digital download, streaming; Track listing: 1. "Fire Saturday" (불토); 2. "Dangerous in Love"	23	KOR: 5,999
Doomchita	Released: June 8, 2022; Label: Vine Entertainment; Formats: CD, digital download, streaming; Track listing: 1. "Doomchita" (둠치타); 2. "Hola"	21	KOR: 12,386
Tap	Released: November 16, 2022; Label: Vine Entertainment; Formats: CD, digital download, streaming; Track listing: 1. "Tap"; 2. "Slam"	57	KOR: 3,880
Doxa	Released: May 24, 2023; Label: Vine Entertainment; Formats: CD, digital download, streaming; Track listing: 1. "Doxa (독사)"; 2. "Beautiful One"	32	KOR: 3,417
Starlight	Released: August 24, 2023; Label: Vine Entertainment; Format: Digital download, streaming; Track listing: 1. "Starlight"; 2. "Crazy Love"	—	—N/a

=== Singles ===
List of singles, showing year released, selected chart positions, and name of the album
Title	Year	Peak chart positions	Album
Title	Year	KOR Down.	Album
Korean
"Who Dis?"	2020	123	Who Dis?
"Got That Boom"	2020	81	Got That Boom
"Fire Saturday" (불토)	2021	73	Fire Saturday
"Doomchita" (둠치타)	2022	76	Doomchita
"Tap"	2022	50	Tap
"Doxa" (독사)	2023	45	Doxa
"Starlight"	2023	183	Starlight
"Don't Touch"	2025	132	Non-album single
"Bitter Sweet"	2025	—	Non-album single
Japanese
"Like It Like It"	2023	122	Like It Like It

=== Soundtrack appearances ===
List of soundtrack appearances, showing year released, selected chart positions, and name of the album
Title	Year	Peak chart positions		Album
Title	Year	KOR Down.	KOR BGM	Album
"Love, Maybe" (사랑인가 봐) (Sung by Dita, Zuu, and Soodam)	2022	84	17	Business Proposal OST Part 5
"Fall In Love" (Sung by Minji, Zuu, and Soodam)	2023	—	—	Love Alarm Clap! Clap! Clap! OST
"Love Love" (Sung by Zuu and Soodam)	2024	—	—	Serendipity's Embrace OST Part 1
"—" denotes a recording that did not chart or was not released in that territory

=== Other charted songs ===
List of other charted songs, showing year released, selected chart positions, and name of the album
Title	Year	Peak chart positions	Album
Title	Year	KOR Down.	Album
"Holiday"	2020	189	Who Dis?
"Dangerous in Love"	2021	188	Fire Saturday
"Hola"	2022	75	Doomchita
"Slam"	2022	69	Tap
"Beautiful One"	2023	46	Doxa

== Videography ==
=== Music videos ===
Title	Year	Director(s)	Ref.
"Who Dis?"	2020	Hong Won-ki (Zanybros)	
"Got That Boom"	2020	Hong Won-ki (Zanybros)	
"Fire Saturday"	2021	Yoo Sung-kyun (Sunny Visual)	
"Doomchita"	2022	Hong Won-ki (Zanybros)	
"Tap"	2022	Hong Won-ki (Zanybros)	
"Slam"	2022	Hong Won-ki (Zanybros)	
"Like it like it"	2023	Yu-ya Hara (Almas)	
"Doxa"	2023	Hong Won-ki (Zanybros)	
"Starlight"	2023	Yang Si-wook (Memud)	
"Don't Touch"	2025		
"Bitter Sweet"	2025		

== Filmography ==
=== Web series ===
Year	Title	Role	Notes	Ref.
2022	Road To Max	Contestant	Road To Mama Finalist	

== Concert and tours ==
=== Headlining concerts ===
Secret Number pasSworLd concert
Date	City	Country	Venue	Opening act	Attendance	Ref.
September 28, 2024	Jakarta	Indonesia	Tennis Indoor Senayan	Tiara Andini	3,300	

=== Showcase ===
The 1st U.S Show(k)ase tour : UNLOCK
Date	City	Country	Venue	Ref.
July 26, 2024	Chicago	United States	Distro Music Hall	
July 28, 2024	Minneapolis	United States	Cedar Cultural Center	
July 31, 2024	Charlotte	United States	Blackbox Theatre	
August 2, 2024	Fort Worth	United States	Ridglea Theatre	
August 4, 2024	Boulder	United States	Fox Theatre	
August 6, 2024	Phoenix	United States	The Rebel Lounge	
August 8, 2024	Seattle	United States	Nectar Lounge	
August 10, 2024	Los Angeles	United States	The Roxy Theatre	

=== Joint tours, concerts, and music festivals ===
Event	Date	Country	Venue	Ref.
Asia Song Festival	October 10, 2020	South Korea	Gyeongju	
Joyland Festival	November 5, 2022	Indonesia	Gelora Bung Karno Softball Stadium	
K-Pop World Festival	October 27, 2023	South Korea	Changwon	
KBS World Radio: Beyond Borders	August 15, 2023	South Korea	N/A	
KCON	October 1, 2022	Saudi Arabia	Boulevard Riyadh City	
Kstyle Party	February 25, 2024	Japan	Ariake Arena	
SBS Super Concert	October 31, 2021	South Korea	Daegu Stadium	
World K-Pop Festival	July 22, 2023	South Korea	Daecheon Beach	
World K-Pop Festival	December 31, 2023	South Korea	Dongdaemun Design Plaza	

Cancelled dates
Event	Date	Country	Venue	Reason	Ref.
GMO Sonic	January 27, 2024	Japan	Saitama Super Arena	Due to various circumstances	

== Award and nominations ==
Name of the award ceremony, year presented, category, nominee of the award, and the result of the nomination
Award ceremony	Year	Category	Nominee(s) / Work(s)	Result	Ref.
APAN Music Awards	2020	Best Female Group	Secret Number	Nominated	
Asia Artist Awards	2020	Best New Female Artist	Secret Number	Won	
Asia Artist Awards	2020	Female Idol Group Popularity Award	Secret Number	Nominated	
Asia Artist Awards	2021	Female Idol Group Popularity Award	Secret Number	Nominated	
Asia Artist Awards	2021	U+ Idol Live Popularity Award (Female Group)	Secret Number	Nominated	
Asia Artist Awards	2023	Female Idol Group Popularity Award	Secret Number	Nominated	
Asian Pop Music Awards (Note: Hosted by the Hong Kong Asia Pacific International Group and Sunway Records, the Asian Pop Music Awards bases its winners on "Asian Pop Music Chart", which began in September 2019.)	2020	Best New Artist (Overseas)	"Who Dis?"	Nominated	
Asian Pop Music Awards	2020	Outstanding Newcomer	Secret Number	Won	
Brand of the Year Awards (Note: It is a large-scale brand award that selects and awards the best brands that shined in the year through direct consumer voting.)	2020	Best Rookie Female Idol Award	Secret Number	Nominated	
Circle Chart Music Awards	2023	Idolplus Global Artist Award	Secret Number	Nominated	
Forbes Korea K-Pop Awards	2021	Female Popularity Award	Secret Number	Nominated	
Indonesian Hallyu Fans Choice Awards	2021	Girl Group Song of the Year	"Fire Saturday"	Won	
K-World Dream Awards (Note: Hosted by the Awards Organizing Committee, Celeb Media, and YJ Partners and sponsored by Sports Today, the K World Dream Awards honors K-pop artists at the center of world culture as part of the Hallyu Wave.)	2022	Popularity Award (Girl Group)	Secret Number	Nominated	
K-World Dream Awards	2023	Popularity Award (Girl Group)	Secret Number	Nominated	
K-World Dream Awards	2023	4th Gen Hot Icon Female Award	Secret Number	Won	
K-World Dream Awards	2023	K-Global Next Leader Award	Secret Number	Won	
Korea First Brand Awards (Note: The Korea First Brand Awards is hosted by the Korea Consumer Brand Committee and the Korea Consumer Forum. Awards are based on a nationwide survey held in South Korea.)	2021	Rookie Female Idol Award	Secret Number	Nominated	
Korea First Brand Awards	2026	Favorite Female Idol	Secret Number	Pending	
MAMA Awards	2020	Best New Female Artist	Secret Number	Nominated	
MAMA Awards	2020	Artist of the Year	Secret Number	Nominated	
MAMA Awards	2020	Worldwide Icon of the Year	Secret Number	Nominated	
MAMA Awards	2022	Road to Max Award	Secret Number	Nominated	
Seoul Music Awards	2021	Rookie of the Year	Secret Number	Nominated	
Seoul Music Awards	2021	K-wave Popularity Award	Secret Number	Nominated	
Seoul Music Awards	2021	Popularity Award	Secret Number	Nominated	
Seoul Music Awards	2021	Fan PD Artist Award	Secret Number	Nominated	
Seoul Music Awards	2021	WhosFandom Award	Secret Number	Nominated	
The Fact Music Awards	2020	Fan N Star Choice Award (Artist)	Secret Number	Nominated	
The Fact Music Awards	2020	TMA Popularity Award	Secret Number	Nominated	
The Fact Music Awards	2021	U+ Idol Live Popularity Award	Secret Number	Nominated	
The Fact Music Awards	2022	Fan N Star Choice Award (Artist)	Secret Number	Nominated	
The Fact Music Awards	2022	Four Star Awards	Secret Number	Nominated	
The Fact Music Awards	2022	Idolplus Popularity Award	Secret Number	Nominated	
The Fact Music Awards	2023	Best Music Summer	"Doxa"	Nominated	
The Fact Music Awards	2023	Best Music Fall	"Starlight"	Nominated	
Tokopedia WIB Indonesia K-pop Awards	2021	Multi Language Group Award	Secret Number	Won	
Universal Superstar Awards (Note: Hosted by KM Chart and Doohub, organized by USA Organizing Committee and Korea Management Federation. The Universal Superstar Awards (U.S.A) is the annual settlement awards of KM Chart and is a global award ceremony that selects and awards artists loved by the world's public and fans through K-Music.)	2024	Universal Best Popularity (Female)	Secret Number	Won	
Universal Superstar Awards	2024	Universal Golden Best	Secret Number	Won	
Universal Superstar Awards	2024	KM Chart Top 6 – Best Hot Choice (Female)	Secret Number	Won	

=== Listicles ===
Name of publisher, year listed, name of listicle, and placement
Publisher	Year	Listicle	Placement	Ref.
Billboard Korea	2020	Best Rookie	Placed	
