= Urban Works Media =

South Korean artist management company

- Native name: 얼반웍스미디어
- Type: Small and medium-sized enterprises
- Industry: Entertainment
- Founded: March 12, 2009
- Founder: Heo Geon
- Headquarters: 4th & 7th floors of Daehak building, 325 OMok-ro, Yangcheon District, Seoul, South Korea
- Key people: Heo Geon (CEO)
- Services: Merchandising and licensing; Planning and production of cultural content; Broadcasting
- Revenue: Less than 5~10 billion won (December 2016)
- Number of employees: 40~70 (December 2014)
- Parent: RBW (2023–2024)
- Subsidiaries: Urbanworks ENT; Urbanworks New Media; Urbanworks Film
- Website: www.urbanworks.co.kr

Urban Works Media (Korean: 얼반웍스미디어) is a South Korean production company founded by Heo Geon in 2009.

On December 29, 2022, it was announced that RBW acquired the company.

On June 1, 2023, Urban Works Media's actor management were taken over by RBW's subsidiary DSP Media.

In September, 2024, RBW sold 50 percent of its stake in Urban Works Media, relinquishing the company from their consolidated subsidiaries.

== Productions ==
=== Television programs ===
Year	Title	Original title	Program Format	Network	Notes
2008	Mystery Special Forces	미스터리 특공대	Variety show	SBS TV	
2008–2009	Solomon TV Law Firm	TV로펌 솔로몬	Variety show	SBS TV	
2008–2010	Family Outing	패밀리가 떴다	Variety show	SBS TV	
2008–2009	Alone in Love	연애시대	Variety show	SBS TV	
2009–2010	Inkigayo	인기가요	Music program	SBS TV	
2009–2010	Love Taxi	러브택시	Variety show	QTV	
2009–2010	Idol Show Season 5	아이돌 군단의 떴다! 그녀 시즌5	Variety show	MBC every1	
2010	Elegant Life	우아한 인생	Variety show	MBC every1	
2010	TaeGukGi: Brotherhood of War	태극기 휘날리며	Special program	SBS TV	2010 World Cup Special program
2010	Cheers for the Women	여자만세	Reality show	QTV	
2010–2011	Kim Jung-eun's Chocolate	김정은의 초콜릿	Music program	SBS TV	
2011	The King of Idols	설날특집 아이돌의 제왕	Special program	SBS TV	Lunar New Year's Day special program
2011	I'm Real Song Joong-ki	I'm Real 송중기	Variety show	QTV	
2011	Kim Yuna's Kiss & Cry	김연아의 키스 & 크라이	Reality show	SBS TV	
2011	2011 Super Model Competition	2011 슈퍼모델 선발대회	Competition show	SBS TV	
—N/a	—N/a	어린이 기호식품 신호등 표시제	—N/a	—N/a	Made for the South Korean Ministry of Health and Welfare Food and Drug Administration
2011–2012	Law of the Jungle Season 1	정글의 법칙 시즌1	Variety show	SBS TV	
2016	Would You Like Girls (My Cosmic Diary)	우주 LIKE 소녀 (김덕후의 덕질일기)	Reality show	Mnet	

=== TV series ===
Year	Title	Original title	Network	Notes	Ref.
2012	Hero	히어로	OCN		
2014	Bad Guys	나쁜녀석들	OCN		
2017	Naked Fireman	맨몸의 소방관	KBS2		
2017	Bad Guys 2	나쁜 녀석들: 악의 도시	OCN		
2018	Radio Romance	라디오 로맨스	KBS2	Co-produced with Plusis Media	
2018	Drama Stage: The Woman Who Makes the Last Meal	드라마 스테이지: 마지막 식사를 만드는 여자	tvN	Co-produced with Studio Dragon	
2019	Black Dog: Being A Teacher	블랙독	tvN	Co-produced with Studio Dragon	
2023	Love Class 2	수업중입니다2	TVING, KT Alpha	Co-produced with Studio Poppy	
2023	Song of the Bandits	도적: 칼의 소리	Netflix	Co-produced with Baram Pictures and Studio Dragon	

== Former Artists ==
=== Artists moved to DSP Media ===
- Lee Seo-young
- Ju Hyeon
- Seong Tae
- Hwang Kyung-ha
- Han Jei
- Kang Dae-hyun
- Kim Chae-won

=== Departed artists ===
- Cho Seung-hee
- Choi Kyu-hwan
- Choi Soo-han
- Choi Sun-il
- Gil Sang
- Han Seo-ul
- Hwang Seung-eon
- Kang Ji-sub
- Kim Eun-Soo
- Kim Jong-kook
- Kim Min-ju
- Lee Bit-na
- Shin So-i
- Lee Cho-ah
- Oh Jae-woong
- Nam Ji-hyun
- V-HAWK
- Kriesha Chu
