= Nekkoya (Pick Me) =

- International artwork. Korean artwork has "Naekkeoya" written in Hangul.

Single by Produce 48
- Released: May 10, 2018
- Recorded: 2018
- Genre: EDM
- Length: 4:39
- Label: Stone Music Entertainment
- Songwriters: Flow Blow; airair; Louise Frick Sveen

"Nekkoya (Pick Me)" (Korean: 내꺼야 (Pick Me); lit. 'You're Mine (Pick Me)') is a song performed by the contestants of the competition show Produce 48 and serves as the show's theme song. It was released as a digital single on May 10, 2018 by CJ E&M and Stone Music Entertainment, along with a music video.

== Track listing ==
Digital downloads as shown on iTunes. The Korean version was listed as the lead track. The piano version was listed separately.

Nekkoya (Pick Me) – digital download
No.	Title	Music	Arranger(s)	Length
1.	"Pick Me" (Korean version)	Flow Blow, airair, Louise Frick Sveen	Flow Blow, airair	4:39
2.	"Nekkoya (Pick Me)" (Japanese version)			4:39
Total length:				9:18

Nekkoya (Pick Me) – piano version
No.	Title	Length
1.	"Nekkoya (Pick Me)"	3:44
Total length:		3:44

== Reception ==
In South Korea, the song did not enter the Gaon Digital Chart, but peaked at number 61 on the Mobile Chart and number 100 on the BGM Chart. In Japan, the song did not enter the Billboard Japan Hot 100, but peaked at number 56 on the Japan Hot 100 Download Chart.
