= Iz*One discography =

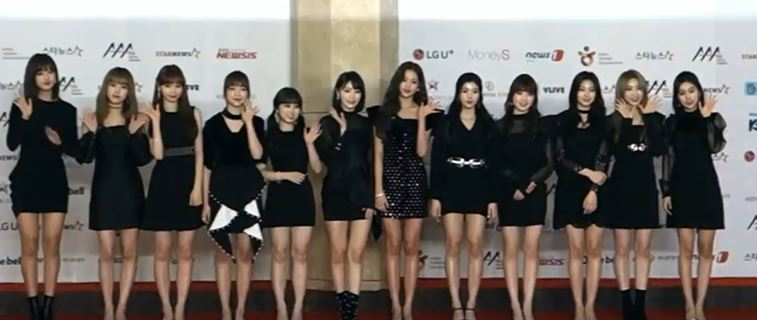
- Studio albums: 2
- EPs: 4
- Singles: 9
- Promotional singles: 2
- Collaborations: 1

The discography of the South Korean–Japanese girl group Iz*One consists of two studio albums, four extended plays and seven singles. As of May 2021, Iz*One has sold over 2.79 million combined albums.

The duodecet's debut release, the Color*Iz EP, was released on October 29, 2018. The Korean release was followed by the group's Japanese debut single, "Suki to Iwasetai", released on February 6, 2019, under UMG's EMI Records label. It subsequently became the group's first release to receive a Platinum certification.

== Studio albums ==
List of studio albums, with selected details, chart positions, sales, and certifications
Title	Details	Peak chart positions					Sales	Certifications
Title	Details	KOR	JPN	JPN Comb	JPN Hot	US World	Sales	Certifications
Bloom*Iz	Released: February 17, 2020 (KOR); Label: Off the Record; Formats: CD, digital download, streaming	2	3	2	6	15	KOR: 493,061; JPN: 23,960; US: 1,000	KMCA: Platinum
Twelve	Released: October 21, 2020 (JPN); Label: EMI; Formats: CD, digital download, streaming	—	1	1	1	—	JPN: 135,113	RIAJ: Gold

== Extended plays ==
List of extended plays, with selected details, chart positions, sales, and certifications
Title	Details	Peak chart positions						Sales	Certifications
Title	Details	KOR	FRA Dig.	JPN	JPN Comb (Note: The Oricon Combined Albums Chart was established on December 24, 2018.)	JPN Hot	US World	Sales	Certifications
Korean
Color*Iz	Released: October 29, 2018; Label: Off the Record; Formats: CD, digital download, streaming	2	184	1	22	3	9	KOR: 282,816; JPN: 48,734; US: 2,000	KMCA: Platinum
Heart*Iz	Released: April 1, 2019; Label: Off the Record; Formats: CD, digital download, streaming	1	—	4	4	5	6	KOR: 315,602; JPN: 40,065	KMCA: Platinum
Oneiric Diary	Released: June 15, 2020; Label: Off the Record, Swing; Formats: CD, digital download, streaming	2	—	4	4	3	—	KOR: 567,351; JPN: 40,987	KMCA: 2× Platinum
One-reeler / Act IV	Released: December 7, 2020; Label: Off the Record, Swing; Formats: CD, digital download, streaming	1	—	8	7	11	—	KOR: 464,860	KMCA: Platinum
Japanese
Suki to Iwasetai	Released: February 5, 2019; Label: EMI; Formats: Digital download, streaming	—	—	—	—	—	—	JPN: 2,555	
Buenos Aires (Note: Special edition extended play.)	Released: June 21, 2019; Label: EMI; Formats: Digital download, streaming	—	—	—	—	—	—	JPN: 1,407	
Vampire	Released: September 25, 2019; Label: EMI; Formats: Digital download, streaming	—	—	—	—	—	—	JPN: 860	

== Singles ==
=== As lead artist ===
List of singles, with selected chart positions, showing year released, sales, certifications and album name
Title	Year	Peak chart positions								Sales (Note: Sales figures for tracks are based on digital downloads, except noted.)	Certifications	Album
Title	Year	KOR	KOR Hot	JPN	JPN Comb (Note: The Oricon Combined Singles Chart was established on December 24, 2018.)	JPN Hot	MYS	SGP	US World	Sales	Certifications	Album
Korean
"La Vie en Rose" (라비앙로즈)	2018	14	11	—	—	21	19	9	6	US: 6,000	RIAJ: Gold (St.)	Color*Iz
"Violeta" (비올레타)	2019	18	5	—	28	13	—	—	8			Heart*Iz
"Fiesta"	2020	3	2	—	24	6	—	—	13		RIAJ: Gold (St.)	Bloom*Iz
"Secret Story of the Swan" (환상동화)	2020	6	9	—	38	14	—	—	11			Oneiric Diary
"Panorama"	2020	22	23	—	47	33	—	—	22		RIAJ: Platinum (St.)	One-reeler / Act IV
Japanese
"Suki to Iwasetai" (好きと言わせたい)	2019	—	—	2	2	2	—	—	—	JPN: 244,284 (Phy.); JPN: 7,016	RIAJ: Platinum (Phy.)	Twelve
"Buenos Aires"	2019	—	—	1	1	1	—	—	—	JPN: 229,428 (Phy.)	RIAJ: Platinum (Phy.)	Twelve
"Vampire"	2019	—	52	1	1	1	—	—	—	JPN: 227,203 (Phy.)	RIAJ: Gold (Phy.)	Twelve
"Beware"	2020	—	—	—	—	75	—	—	—			Twelve
"—" denotes releases that did not chart or were not released in that region.

=== Promotional singles ===
Title	Year	Peak chart positions		Album
Title	Year	KOR	US World	Album
"D-D-Dance" (Promotional Single for Universe)	2021	72	25	Non-album single
"Zero:Attitude" (Soyou, Iz*One (Note: Only Kwon Eun-bi, Sakura Miyawaki, Kim Min-ju, Jo Yu-ri and Jang Won-young participated.) featuring pH-1)	2021	119	—	2021 Pepsi X Starship

=== Collaborations ===
Title	Year	Album
"Rise" (Jonas Blue featuring Iz*One)	2019	Blue

== Other charted songs ==
List of other charted songs, with selected chart positions, showing year released and album name
Title	Year	Peak chart positions		Album
Title	Year	KOR	KOR Hot	Album
"Eyes"	2020	125	—	Bloom*Iz
"Dreamlike"	2020	127	—	Bloom*Iz
"Ayayaya"	2020	110	74	Bloom*Iz
"So Curious"	2020	120	—	Bloom*Iz
"Spaceship"	2020	130	96	Bloom*Iz
"Destiny" (우연이 아니야)	2020	134	—	Bloom*Iz
"You & I"	2020	144	—	Bloom*Iz
"Daydream"	2020	162	—	Bloom*Iz
"Pink Blusher"	2020	167	—	Bloom*Iz
"Someday" (언젠가 우리의 밤도 지나가겠죠)	2020	132	—	Bloom*Iz
"Open Your Eyes"	2020	164	—	Bloom*Iz
"Welcome"	2020	131	91	Oneiric Diary
"Pretty"	2020	122	92	Oneiric Diary
"Merry-Go-Round" (회전목마)	2020	92	65	Oneiric Diary
"Rococo"	2020	160	93	Oneiric Diary
"With*One"	2020	152	—	Oneiric Diary
"Sequence"	2020	183	—	One-reeler / Act IV
"O Sole Mio"	2020	200	—	One-reeler / Act IV
"—" denotes releases that did not chart.

== Guest appearances ==
List of non-single guest appearances, showing year released, other artist(s) featured, and album name
Title	Year	Other artist(s)	Album
"Hitsuzensei" (必然性) (IZ4648 (Note: Unit consisting of Jang Won-young, Sakura Miyawaki, Jo Yu-ri, Nako Yabuki, Kwon Eun-bi, Hitomi Honda and select members of AKB48, SKE48, HKT48, Nogizaka46 and Keyakizaka46.))	2019	AKB48	Jiwaru Days
"3!4!" (Originally by Roo'ra)	2021	None	Rewind : Blossom

== Videography ==
=== Music videos ===
Title	Year	Album	Director(s)	Ref.
Korean
"La Vie en Rose" (라비앙로즈)	2018	Color*Iz	Paranoid Paradigm (VM Project Architecture)	
"Violeta" (비올레타)	2019	Heart*Iz	Digipedi	
"Fiesta"	2020	Bloom*Iz	Yoon Rima, Jang Dongju (Rigend Film Studio)	
"Secret Story of the Swan" (환상동화)	2020	Oneiric Diary	Ziyong Kim (FantazyLab)	
"Panorama"	2020	One-Reeler / Act IV	Vishop (Vikings League)	
Japanese
"Suki to Iwasetai" (好きと言わせたい)^{1}	2019	Suki To Iwasetai	Kazuma Ikeda	
"Gokigen Sayonara" (ご機嫌サヨナラ)	2019	Suki To Iwasetai	Yasuhiro Arafune	
"Neko ni Naritai" (猫になりたい)	2019	Suki To Iwasetai	bait Saito	
"Buenos Aires"^{1}	2019	Buenos Aires	Kyotaro Hayashi	
"Target"	2019	Buenos Aires	Mitsunori Yokobori	
"Toshishita Boyfriend" (年下Boyfriend)	2019	Buenos Aires	Yasuhiro Arafune	
"Vampire"^{1}	2019	Vampire	Takehiro Shiraishi	
"Beware"	2020	Twelve	Vishop (Vikings League)	
Promotional singles
"D-D-Dance" (Promotional single for Universe)	2021	Non-Album Single	Young-Ji Choi (PINKLABEL VISUAL)	
"Zero:Attitude" (Soyou, Iz*One featuring pH-1)	2021	2021 Pepsi X Starship	Young-Ji Choi (PINKLABEL VISUAL)	

^1: All Re-Released on Twelve

=== Other videos ===
Title	Year	Director	Ref.
"Concept Trailer: What IZ your color?"	2018	SUNNYVISUAL STUDIO	
"Concept Trailer: Where HEART IZ?"	2019	Digipedi	
"Concept Trailer: When IZ your BLOOMing Moment?"	2019	Rima Yoon, Dongju Jang (Rigend Film)	
"Oneiric Diary Album Trailer"	2020	Unknown	

=== DVD ===
Title	Album details	Sales
IZ*ONE [Secret Time] Photobook	Released: March 22, 2019; Label: Stone Music, Off the Record; Format: DVD + Photobook	—N/a
IZ*ONE – SPRING COLLECTION [SECRET DIARY]	Released: March 31, 2020; Label: Stone Music, Off the Record; Format: DVD + Photobook/ Calendar	—N/a
IZ*ONE – 1ST CONCERT IN SEOUL [EYES ON ME]	Released: October 23, 2020; Label: Stone Music, Off the Record; Format: DVD, BLURAY, Kit	—N/a
IZ*ONE – ONLINE CONCERT [ONEIRIC THEATER]	Released: January 29, 2021; Label: Stone Music, Off the Record; Format: BLURAY, Kit	—N/a
