= List of Iz*One concert tours =

This is a list of concerts and tours by South Korean–Japanese girl group Iz*One. The group held their first standalone concert, Iz*One "Color*Iz" Show-Con, on October 29, 2018, in conjunction with the release of their debut Korean extended play Color*Iz. Their second standalone concert, Iz*One Japan Debut Showcase, was held on January 20, 2019, in support of their debut Japanese single "Suki to Iwasetai". From June 7, 2019, to September 25, 2019, Iz*One headlined their only Asia tour, Iz*One 1st Concert "Eyes On Me", with 11 shows in 5 countries, drawing a total audience of 81,000. On September 13, 2020, the group held their first online concert, "Oneiric Theater", as in-person concerts were not possible due to the COVID-19 pandemic. Their final concert, "One, the Story", also in virtual format, was broadcast On March 13 and 14, 2021, ahead of the group's disbandment.

== Concert tours ==
=== Iz*One 1st Concert "Eyes On Me" ===
Iz*One 1st Concert "Eyes On Me"
- Asia tour by Iz*One
- Location: South Korea; Thailand; Taiwan; Hong Kong; Japan
- Associated album: Color*Iz; Heart*Iz
- Start date: June 7, 2019
- End date: September 25, 2019
- Legs: 5
- No. of shows: 11

Iz*One concert chronology
- Iz*One Japan Debut Showcase (2019); Iz*One 1st Concert "Eyes On Me" (2019); Iz*One Online Concert "Oneiric Theater" (2020)

In May 2019, Iz*One was announced to be headlining their first Asia tour titled "Eyes on Me". After tickets for the first two initial dates–June 8 and 9–were sold out, Off the Record added an additional concert date on June 7. The tour began on June 7, 2019, at the Jamsil Indoor Stadium in Seoul, South Korea, and concluded on September 25, 2019, at the Saitama Super Arena in Saitama, Japan. During the tour, Iz*One performed two new songs, "Ayayaya" and "So Curious", as sub-units. Overall, the group visited eight cities in five territories, with 81,000 attendance in total. The tour was documented in a documentary film titled Eyes on Me: The Movie. Originally scheduled for November 2019, the film's release was postponed indefinitely after Iz*One entered a hiatus due to the Mnet vote manipulation investigation. It was released on June 10, 2020.

==== Set list ====
1. "Hey. Bae. Like It."
2. "O' My!"
3. "We Together"
4. "Nekoni Naritai" (Korean version)
5. "Gokigen Sayonara" (Korean version)
6. "Airplane"
7. "Yume wo Miteiru Aida"
8. "Really Like You"
9. "Colors"
10. "To Reach You"
11. "Rollin' Rollin'"
12. "I Am"
13. "Nekkoya (Pick Me)"
14. "So Curious" (Exclusive Track)
15. "Ayayaya" (Exclusive Track)
16. "Suki to Iwasetai"
17. "Suki ni Nacchau Darō?"
18. "Highlight"
19. "La Vie en Rose"
20. "Rumor"
21. "Violeta"
22. "Memory"
23. "Up"

==== Tour dates ====
Date	City	Country	Venue	Est. Attendance
June 7, 2019	Seoul	South Korea	Jamsil Arena	18,000
June 8, 2019	Seoul	South Korea	Jamsil Arena	18,000
June 9, 2019	Seoul	South Korea	Jamsil Arena	18,000
June 16, 2019	Bangkok	Thailand	MCC Hall, The Mall Bangkapi	4,000
June 29, 2019	New Taipei City	Taiwan	Xinzhuang Gymnasium	4,000
July 13, 2019	Hong Kong		AsiaWorld–Expo	5,000
August 21, 2019	Chiba	Japan	Makuhari Messe	14,000
September 1, 2019	Kobe	Japan	World Memorial Hall	20,000
September 1, 2019	Kobe	Japan	World Memorial Hall	20,000
September 8, 2019	Fukuoka	Japan	Marine Messe Fukuoka	20,000
September 25, 2019	Saitama	Japan	Saitama Super Arena	16,000
Total				81,000

== Standalone concerts ==
=== Iz*One "Color*Iz" Show-Con ===
Iz*One "Color*Iz" Show-Con
- Concert by Iz*One
- Associated album: Color*Iz
- Date: October 29, 2018

Iz*One concert chronology
- Iz*One "Color*Iz" Show-Con (2018); Iz*One Online Concert "One, the Story" (2019)

On October 29, 2018, Iz*One held their first concert titled "Iz*One "Color*Iz" Show-Con" in conjunction with the release of their debut EP at the Olympic Hall in Seoul, South Korea. Tickets for the concert were sold out within a minute of being on sale.

==== Set list ====
1. "We Together"
2. "You Are in Love, Right?"
3. "Memory"
4. "O' My!"
5. "1000%"
6. "Rumor"
7. "La Vie en Rose"
8. "Nekkoya (Pick Me)"

=== Iz*One Japan Debut Showcase ===
Iz*One Japan Debut Showcase
- Concert by Iz*One
- Date: January 20, 2019

Iz*One concert chronology
- Iz*One "Color*Iz" Show-Con (2018); Iz*One Japan Debut Showcase (2019); Iz*One 1st Concert "Eyes On Me" (2019)

On January 20, 2019, Iz*One held a concert titled "Iz*One Japan Debut Showcase" at the Tokyo Dome City Hall to promote their debut in Japan and the release of their debut Japanese single "Suki to Iwasetai".

==== Set list ====
1. "La Vie en Rose"
2. "We Together"
3. "Suki ni Nacchau Darō?"
4. "Neko ni Naritai"
5. "I Am"
6. "Gokigen Sayonara"
7. "See You Again"
8. "Dance wo Omoidasu Made"
9. "Yume wo Miteiru Aida" (Japanese version)
10. "Suki to Iwasetai"
11. "O' My!"
12. "Nekkoya (Pick Me)" (Japanese version)

== Online concerts ==
=== Iz*One Online Concert "Oneiric Theater" ===
Iz*One Online Concert "Oneiric Theater"
- Online concert by Iz*One
- Associated album: Oneiric Diary
- Date: September 13, 2020

Iz*One concert chronology
- Iz*One 1st Concert "Eyes On Me" (2019); Iz*One Online Concert "Oneiric Theater" (2020); Iz*One Online Concert "One, the Story" (2021)

In August 2020, Iz*One announced an upcoming concert titled "Oneiric Theater" which was to be held virtually due to restrictions related to the COVID-19 pandemic. The concert was broadcast on September 13, 2020.

==== Set list ====
1. "Welcome"
2. "Secret Story of the Swan"
3. "Merry-Go-Round"
4. "Rococo"
5. "O' My!"
6. "Pretty"
7. "You & I"
8. "Memory"
9. "Someday"
10. "Catallena" (Orange Caramel cover; performed by Hyewon, Chaewon, and Wonyoung)
11. "Coming of Age Ceremony" (Park Ji-yoon cover, performed by Minju, Nako, Hitomi, and Yuri)
12. "Monster" (Red Velvet - Irene & Seulgi cover; performed by Eunbi and Sakura)
13. "Gangsta (Kehlani cover; performed by Yena, Chaeyeon, and Yujin)
14. "La Vie en Rose"
15. "Violeta"
16. "Fiesta"
17. "Up"
18. "Airplane"
19. "Spaceship"
20. "Destiny"
21. "Yume wo Miteiru Aida"
22. "With*One"

=== Iz*One Online Concert "One, the Story" ===
Iz*One Online Concert "One, the Story"
- Online concert by Iz*One
- Associated album: One Reeler / Act IV
- Date: March 13–14, 2021
- No. of shows: 2

Iz*One concert chronology
- Iz*One Online Concert "Oneiric Theater" (2020); Iz*One Online Concert "One, the Story" (2021)

On February 11, 2021, Iz*One announced their second and final online concert titled "One, the Story". The concert was broadcast on March 13 and 14.

==== Set list ====
1. "La Vie en Rose"
2. "Mise-en-Scène"
3. "Colors"
4. "O' My!"
5. "Really Like You"
6. "Hey. Bae. Like it."
7. "Highlight"
8. "Violeta"
9. "Señorita" (Camila Cabello and Shawn Mendes cover; performed by Eunbi)
10. "All Hands on Deck (Tinashe cover; performed by Hitomi)
11. "Señorita" (Camila Cabello and Shawn Mendes cover; performed by Eunbi and Hitomi)
12. "Full Moon" (Sunmi cover; performed by Sakura, Chaeyeon, and Minju)
13. "Adrenaline" (Girls' Generation-TTS cover; performed by Chaewon, Yuri, and Yujin)
14. "Sunny" (Boney M cover; performed by Hyewon, Yena, Nako, and Wonyoung)
15. "Roly-Poly" (T-ara cover; performed by Hyewon, Yena, Nako, and Wonyoung)
16. "Open Your Eyes"
17. "Up"
18. "Airplane"
19. "Spaceship"
20. "Fiesta"
21. "Rococo"
22. "Merry-Go-Round"
23. "Secret Story of the Swan"
24. "Panorama"
25. "Sequence"
26. "With*One"
27. "Lesson"
28. "Slow Journey"
