= List of awards and nominations received by Iz*One =

Iz*One awards and nominations
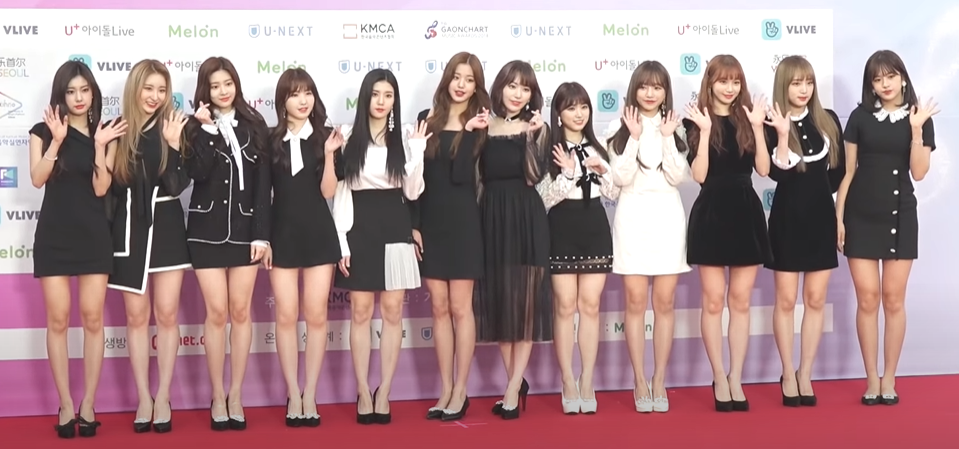
- Iz*One at the 2019 Gaon Chart Music Awards
Awards and nominations
Award	Wins	Nominations
APAN Music Awards	2	3
Asia Artist Awards	3	6
Asian Pop Music Awards	1	2
The Fact Music Awards	1	2
Gaon Chart Music Awards	2	7
Genie Music Awards	2	7
Golden Disc Awards	1	4
Japan Gold Disc Awards	2	2
Melon Music Awards	1	6
Mnet Asian Music Awards	3	15
MTV Europe Music Awards	0	1
Seoul Music Awards	2	11
Soribada Best K-Music Awards	2	4
Space Shower Music Awards	0	1
V Live Awards	2	3

Totals (Note: Certain award groups do not simply award one winner. They acknowledge several different recipients, have runners-up, and have third place. Since this is a specific recognition and is different from losing an award, runner-up mentions are considered wins in this award tally. For simplification and to avoid errors, each award in this list has been presumed to have had a prior nomination.)
- Wins: 24
- Nominations: 74

Iz*One was a twelve-member South Korean and Japanese girl group formed in 2018 through Produce 48, a music competition reality show. The group achieved significant commercial success with its debut extended play Color*Iz (2018), released under Off the Record Entertainment, and won several new artist awards, including Best New Artist at the 20th Mnet Asian Music Awards, Rookie of the Year at the 33rd Golden Disc Awards, and the New Artist Award at the 28th Seoul Music Awards. The group's second EP, Heart*Iz (2019), was released to greater commercial success than its predecessor, and received Disc Bonsang (Note: A bonsang (Korean: 본상), which translates to "main prize", is a major award given at a South Korean award ceremony. At music award ceremonies, bonsangs are awarded to the top ten or twelve best-selling (physical and digital) artists of the year.) nominations at the 34th Golden Disc Awards and the 29th Seoul Music Awards respectively. The EP's lead single, "Violeta", received a nomination for Song of the Year at the 21st Mnet Asian Music Awards.

The group earned its first ever daesang (Note: A daesang (Korean: 대상), which translates to "grand prize", is the highest honor given out at South Korean music award ceremonies in recognition of the artist with the greatest physical and digital achievements for the year.) award nominations for its first studio album Bloom*Iz, released in February 2020. The album was nominated for Album of the Year at both the 12th Melon Music Awards and the 10th Gaon Chart Music Awards, while its lead single "Fiesta" was also nominated at both ceremonies for Best Dance – Female and Song of the Year – February respectively. Iz*One did not win any of the nominations but the group received its second Artist of the Year bonsang at the Melon Music Awards. Bloom*Iz garnered an additional Bonsang Award nomination at the 30th Seoul Music Awards. The group's follow-up EP, Oneiric Diary, released in June 2020, was also nominated alongside its predecessor at the Gaon Awards, for Album of the Year – 3rd Quarter. The group won its third Artist of the Year bonsang at the 3rd Fact Music Awards in December 2020.

== Awards and nominations ==
Name of the award ceremony, year presented, category, nominee(s) of the award, and the result of the nomination
Award ceremony	Year	Category	Nominee(s)/work(s)	Result	Ref.
APAN Music Awards	2020	APAN Top 10 (Bonsang)	Iz*One	Won	
APAN Music Awards	2020	Idol Champ Fan's Pick – Group	Iz*One	Won	
APAN Music Awards	2020	Idol Champ Global Pick – Group	Iz*One	Nominated	
Asia Artist Awards	2018	Rookie of the Year (Music)	Iz*One	Won	
Asia Artist Awards	2019	Popularity Award – Music	Iz*One	Nominated	
Asia Artist Awards	2019	StarNews Popularity Award – Female Group	Iz*One	Longlisted	
Asia Artist Awards	2020	Best Musician Award	Iz*One	Won	
Asia Artist Awards	2020	Potential Award	Iz*One	Won	
Asia Artist Awards	2020	Popularity Award	Iz*One	Longlisted	
Asian Pop Music Awards	2020	Best Female Group (Overseas)	Bloom*Iz	Nominated	
Asian Pop Music Awards	2020	Outstanding Group of the Year	Iz*One	Won	
The Fact Music Awards	2020	Artist of the Year (Bonsang)	Iz*One	Won	
The Fact Music Awards	2020	TMA Popularity Award	Iz*One	Nominated	
Gaon Chart Music Awards	2018	New Artist of the Year	Iz*One	Won	
Gaon Chart Music Awards	2020	Album of the Year – 1st Quarter	Bloom*Iz	Nominated	
Gaon Chart Music Awards	2020	Album of the Year – 3rd Quarter	Oneiric Diary	Nominated	
Gaon Chart Music Awards	2020	The Hot Performance of the Year	Iz*One	Won	
Gaon Chart Music Awards	2020	MuBeat Female Global Choice	Iz*One	Nominated	
Gaon Chart Music Awards	2020	Song of the Year – February	"Fiesta"	Nominated	
Gaon Chart Music Awards	2021	Album of the Year – 1st Quarter	One-reeler / Act IV	Won	
Gaon Chart Music Awards	2021	Artist of the Year (Digital Music) – December	"Panorama"	Nominated	
Genie Music Awards	2019	Best Dance Performance (Female)	Iz*One	Won	
Genie Music Awards	2019	M2 Most Popular Artist	Iz*One	Won	
Genie Music Awards	2019	Best Female Group	Iz*One	Nominated	
Genie Music Awards	2019	Genie Music Popularity Award	Iz*One	Nominated	
Genie Music Awards	2019	Global Popularity Award	Iz*One	Nominated	
Genie Music Awards	2019	Top Artist	Iz*One	Nominated	
Genie Music Awards	2020	Singer of the Year	Iz*One	Nominated	
Golden Disc Awards	2019	Rookie of the Year	Iz*One	Won	
Golden Disc Awards	2019	Most Popular K-pop Star	Iz*One	Nominated	
Golden Disc Awards	2019	Popularity Award	Iz*One	Nominated	
Golden Disc Awards	2020	Disc Bonsang	Heart*Iz	Nominated	
Japan Gold Disc Awards	2020	Best 3 New Artist (Asia)	Iz*One	Won	
Japan Gold Disc Awards	2020	New Artist of the Year (Asia)	Iz*One	Won	
Melon Music Awards	2018	Best New Female Artist	Iz*One	Nominated	
Melon Music Awards	2020	Top 10 (Bonsang Award)	Iz*One	Won	
Melon Music Awards	2020	Album of the Year (Daesang)	Bloom*Iz	Nominated	
Melon Music Awards	2020	Artist of the Year (Daesang)	Iz*One	Nominated	
Melon Music Awards	2020	Best Dance – Female	"Fiesta"	Nominated	
Melon Music Awards	2020	Netizen Popularity Award	Iz*One	Nominated	
Mnet Asian Music Awards	2018	Best New Female Artist	Iz*One	Won	
Mnet Asian Music Awards	2018	New Asian Artist	Iz*One	Won	
Mnet Asian Music Awards	2018	Artist of the Year	Iz*One	Longlisted	
Mnet Asian Music Awards	2019	Artist of the Year	Iz*One	Longlisted	
Mnet Asian Music Awards	2019	Best Dance Performance (Female Group)	Iz*One	Nominated	
Mnet Asian Music Awards	2019	Best Female Group	Iz*One	Nominated	
Mnet Asian Music Awards	2019	Qoo10 Favorite Female Artist	Iz*One	Nominated	
Mnet Asian Music Awards	2019	Song of the Year	"Violeta"	Longlisted	
Mnet Asian Music Awards	2019	Worldwide Fans' Choice Top 10	Iz*One	Nominated	
Mnet Asian Music Awards	2020	Favorite Female Group	Iz*One	Won	
Mnet Asian Music Awards	2020	Artist of the Year	Iz*One	Longlisted	
Mnet Asian Music Awards	2020	Best Dance Performance – Female Group	Iz*One	Nominated	
Mnet Asian Music Awards	2020	Best Female Group	Iz*One	Nominated	
Mnet Asian Music Awards	2020	Song of the Year	"Secret Story of the Swan"	Longlisted	
Mnet Asian Music Awards	2020	Worldwide Icon of the Year	Iz*One	Longlisted	
MTV Europe Music Awards	2019	Best Korean Act	Iz*One	Nominated	
Seoul Music Awards	2018	New Artist Award	Iz*One	Won	
Seoul Music Awards	2018	Hallyu Special Award	Iz*One	Nominated	
Seoul Music Awards	2018	Popularity Award	Iz*One	Nominated	
Seoul Music Awards	2019	Bonsang Award	Heart*Iz	Nominated	
Seoul Music Awards	2019	Hallyu Special Award	Iz*One	Nominated	
Seoul Music Awards	2019	Most Popular K-Pop Artist Award	Iz*One	Nominated	
Seoul Music Awards	2019	Popularity Award	Iz*One	Nominated	
Seoul Music Awards	2020	Bonsang Award	Bloom*Iz	Won	
Seoul Music Awards	2020	Hallyu Special Award	Iz*One	Nominated	
Seoul Music Awards	2020	Popularity Award	Iz*One	Nominated	
Soribada Best K-Music Awards	2019	Bonsang Award	Iz*One	Nominated	
Soribada Best K-Music Awards	2019	Popularity Award (Female)	Iz*One	Nominated	
Soribada Best K-Music Awards	2020	Bonsang Award	Iz*One	Won	
Soribada Best K-Music Awards	2020	Global Hot Trend Award	Iz*One	Won	
Space Shower Music Awards	2020	People's Choice	Iz*One	Nominated	
V Live Awards	2019	Global Top 12	Iz*One	Won	
V Live Awards	2019	Rookie Top 5	Iz*One	Won	
V Live Awards	2019	Most Loved Artist	Iz*One	Nominated	
