= Twelve (Iz*One album) =

2020 studio album by Iz*One

- Physical cover (Artwork from Type A version cover)

Studio album by Iz*One
- Released: October 21, 2020
- Recorded: 2018–2020
- Genre: J-pop
- Length: 49:46
- Language: Japanese
- Label: EMI; Universal Japan; Off the Record
- Producer: Toshihiko Watanabe; Chocolate Mix; Apazzi; Hirotaka Hayakawa; Belex; Detune3; MosPick; Park Seul-gi; Choi Hyun-joon; Kim Seung-soo; Iggy; Yongbae; Masaki Iehara

Iz*One chronology
Oneiric Diary (2020)	Twelve (2020)	One-reeler / Act IV (2020)

Singles from Twelve
- 1. "Suki to Iwasetai" Released: February 5, 2019; 2. "Buenos Aires" Released: June 26, 2019; 3. "Vampire" Released: September 25, 2019; 4. "Beware" Released: October 6, 2020

Twelve is the first and only Japanese-language studio album (second and final overall) by South Korean–Japanese girl group Iz*One. It was released on October 21, 2020. The album was released in three different physical versions with seven different cover issues. It also contains selected tracks from previous Korean-language records re-released in Japanese.

== Commercial performance ==
The album debuted at number one on both the Japanese Oricon chart and the Billboard Japan Hot Albums chart becoming their first project to do so. The album sold over 124,178 units on its opening day breaking the record of the highest first-day album sales by a K-pop girl group in Japan, a record previously held by #Twice2 by Twice which sold 95,825 units on its release day.

== Track listing ==
Twelve – Special Edition version (digital)
No.	Title	Lyrics	Music	Arrangement	Length
1.	"Beware"	Yasushi Akimoto	Miki Watanabe	Watanabe	4:10
2.	"Vampire"	Akimoto	Chocolate Mix	Chocolate Mix	3:48
3.	"Suki to Iwasetai" (好きと言わせたい)	Akimoto	Chocolate Mix	APAZZI	4:01
4.	"Waiting"	Akimoto	Toshihiko Watanabe	Toshihiko Watanabe; Hirotaka Hayakawa	4:12
5.	"Buenos Aires"	Akimoto	Miki Watanabe	Watanabe	4:23
6.	"Suki ni Nacchau Darō?" (好きになっちゃうだろう？; IZ*ONE version)	Akimoto	Hirotaka Hayakawa; Belex	Hirotaka Hayakawa; Belex	4:10
7.	"Yummy Summer"	Miyawaki Sakura	Miyawaki Sakura; 4713; Coll!n; J6; Detune3; ZaddY; WebbY	Detune3	3:26
8.	"La vie en Rose" (Japanese version)	MosPick; Hitomi Honda	MosPick	MosPick	3:41
9.	"Violeta" (Japanese version)	Choi Hyun-joon; Kim Seung-soo; Nako Yabuki	Choi Hyun-joon; Kim Seung-soo	Park Seul-gi	3:22
10.	"Fiesta" (Japanese version)	Seo Ji-eum; Go Hyun-jung (Jam Factory (music publisher)); Choi Hyun-joon; Kim Seung-soo; Miyawaki	Choi Hyun-joon; Kim Seung-soo	Choi Hyun-joon; Kim Seung-soo	3:41
11.	"Yume o Miteiru Aida" (夢を見ている間; IZ*ONE version)	Akimoto	Iggy; Yongbae (SYB)	Iggy; Yongbae (SYB)	3:30
12.	"Dō Sureba Ii?" (どうすればいい？)	Akimoto	Shō Watanabe	Masaki Iehara	2:54
13.	"Shy boy"	Akimoto	Miki Watanabe	Watanabe	4:23
Total length:					0:50:00

Twelve – Type A version (CD)
No.	Title	Lyrics	Music	Arrangement	Length
1.	"Beware"	Yasushi Akimoto	Miki Watanabe	Watanabe	4:10
2.	"Vampire"	Akimoto	Chocolate Mix	Chocolate Mix	3:48
3.	"Suki to Iwasetai" (好きと言わせたい)	Akimoto	Chocolate Mix	APAZZI	4:01
4.	"Waiting"	Akimoto	Toshihiko Watanabe	Toshihiko Watanabe; Hirotaka Hayakawa	4:12
5.	"Buenos Aires"	Akimoto	Miki Watanabe	Watanabe	4:23
6.	"Suki ni Nacchau Darō?" (好きになっちゃうだろう？; IZ*ONE version)	Akimoto	Hirotaka Hayakawa; Belex	Hirotaka Hayakawa; Belex	4:10
7.	"Yummy Summer"	Miyawaki Sakura	Miyawaki Sakura; 4713; Coll!n; J6; Detune3; ZaddY; WebbY	Detune3	3:26
8.	"La vie en Rose" (Japanese version)	MosPick; Hitomi Honda	MosPick	MosPick	3:41
9.	"Violeta" (Japanese version)	Choi Hyun-joon; Kim Seung-soo; Nako Yabuki	Choi Hyun-joon; Kim Seung-soo	Park Seul-gi	3:22
10.	"Fiesta" (Japanese version)	Seo Ji-eum; Go Hyun-jung (Jam Factory (music publisher)); Choi Hyun-joon; Kim Seung-soo; Miyawaki	Choi Hyun-joon; Kim Seung-soo	Choi Hyun-joon; Kim Seung-soo	3:41
11.	"Yume o Miteiru Aida" (夢を見ている間; IZ*ONE version)	Akimoto	Iggy; Yongbae (SYB)	Iggy; Yongbae (SYB)	3:30

Twelve – Type A version (DVD)
No.	Title	Length
1.	"Beware" (Music video)
2.	"IZ*ONE JAPAN 1st Fan Meeting" (Live Performance (9 songs))

Twelve – Type B version CD
No.	Title	Lyrics	Music	Arrangement	Length
1.	"Beware"	Yasushi Akimoto	Miki Watanabe	Watanabe	4:10
2.	"Vampire"	Akimoto	Chocolate Mix	Chocolate Mix	3:48
3.	"Suki to Iwasetai" (好きと言わせたい)	Akimoto	Chocolate Mix	APAZZI	4:01
4.	"Waiting"	Akimoto	Toshihiko Watanabe	Toshihiko Watanabe; Hirotaka Hayakawa	4:12
5.	"Buenos Aires"	Akimoto	Miki Watanabe	Watanabe	4:23
6.	"Suki ni Nacchau Darō?" (好きになっちゃうだろう？; IZ*ONE version)	Akimoto	Hirotaka Hayakawa; Belex	Hirotaka Hayakawa; Belex	4:10
7.	"Dō Sureba Ii?" (どうすればいい？)	Akimoto	Shō Watanabe	Masaki Iehara	2:54
8.	"La vie en Rose" (Japanese version)	MosPick; Hitomi Honda	MosPick	MosPick	3:41
9.	"Violeta" (Japanese version)	Choi Hyun-joon; Kim Seung-soo; Nako Yabuki	Choi Hyun-joon; Kim Seung-soo	Park Seul-gi	3:22
10.	"Fiesta" (Japanese version)	Seo Ji-eum; Go Hyun-jung (Jam Factory (music publisher)); Choi Hyun-joon; Kim Seung-soo; Miyawaki	Choi Hyun-joon; Kim Seung-soo	Choi Hyun-joon; Kim Seung-soo	3:41
11.	"Yume o Miteiru Aida" (夢を見ている間; IZ*ONE version)	Akimoto	Iggy; Yongbae (SYB)	Iggy; Yongbae (SYB)	3:30

Twelve – Type B version (DVD)
No.	Title	Length
1.	"Beware" (Music video)
2.	"Beware" (Music Video Making)
3.	"好きと言わせたい (Suki to Iwasetai)" (Music Video)
4.	"ご機嫌サヨナラ (Gokigen Sayonara)" (Music Video)
5.	"猫になりたい (Neko ni Naritai)" (Music Video)
6.	"Buenos Aires" (Music Video)
7.	"Target" (Music Video)
8.	"年下Boyfriend (Toshisita Boyfriend)" (Music Video)
9.	"Vampire" (Music Video Making)
10.	"IZ*ONE JAPAN 1st Fan Meeting" (Making)

Twelve – WIZ*ONE version (CD)
No.	Title	Lyrics	Music	Arrangement	Length
1.	"Beware"	Yasushi Akimoto	Miki Watanabe	Watanabe	4:10
2.	"Vampire"	Akimoto	Chocolate Mix	Chocolate Mix	3:48
3.	"Suki to Iwasetai" (好きと言わせたい)	Akimoto	Chocolate Mix	APAZZI	4:01
4.	"Waiting"	Akimoto	Toshihiko Watanabe	Toshihiko Watanabe; Hirotaka Hayakawa	4:12
5.	"Buenos Aires"	Akimoto	Miki Watanabe	Watanabe	4:23
6.	"Suki ni Nacchau Darō?" (好きになっちゃうだろう？; IZ*ONE version)	Akimoto	Hirotaka Hayakawa; Belex	Hirotaka Hayakawa; Belex	4:10
7.	"Shy boy"	Akimoto	Miki Watanabe	Watanabe	4:23
8.	"La vie en Rose" (Japanese version)	MosPick; Hitomi Honda	MosPick	MosPick	3:41
9.	"Violeta" (Japanese version)	Choi Hyun-joon; Kim Seung-soo; Nako Yabuki	Choi Hyun-joon; Kim Seung-soo	Park Seul-gi	3:22
10.	"Fiesta" (Japanese version)	Seo Ji-eum; Go Hyun-jung (Jam Factory (music publisher)); Choi Hyun-joon; Kim Seung-soo; Miyawaki	Choi Hyun-joon; Kim Seung-soo	Choi Hyun-joon; Kim Seung-soo	3:41
11.	"Yume o Miteiru Aida" (夢を見ている間; IZ*ONE version)	Akimoto	Iggy; Yongbae (SYB)	Iggy; Yongbae (SYB)	3:30

== Charts ==
=== Weekly charts ===
Weekly chart performance of Twelve
Chart (2020)	Peak position
Japan Hot Albums (Billboard Japan)	1
Japanese Albums (Oricon)	1

=== Year-end charts ===
Year-end chart performance of Twelve
Chart (2020)	Position
Japanese Albums (Oricon)	25

== Sales ==
Sales for Twelve
Region	Certification	Certified units/sales
Japan	—	135,113
