= D-D-Dance =

2021 promotional single by Iz*One

Promotional single by Iz*One
- Language: Korean
- Released: January 26, 2021
- Genre: Dance-pop
- Length: 3:25
- Label: Klap; Kakao M
- Songwriter: Full8loom

"D-D-Dance" is a song recorded by South Korean-Japanese girl group Iz*One. It was released on January 26, 2021 with Universe which is a global fandom platform that allows users to enjoy various fandom activities anytime on mobile. Iz*One was previously revealed as the very first artist to join the platform. "D-D-Dance" is a dance-pop song with lively and rhythmic guitar and synth sounds.

This was the very last song released by the group as a whole before their disbandment in April of the same year.

== Background ==
On November 12, 2020, Iz*One was announced as the first member to join South Korean web platform Universe. Then on January 17, 2021, Universe revealed a teaser schedule for a new release from Iz*One titled "D-D-DANCE". The song was then announced to drop on January 26 and a schedule for the song's release was also announced. Concept photos for the song were released from January 18 to January 24 followed by two teasers on January 24 and 26 respectively. The concept photo features the group members all wearing Royal Blue uniform outfits with traditional patterns all over them. The official music video for the song was released on January 28 on the Universe app.

== Composition ==
The song is composed in the key B minor and has 125 beats per minute and a running time of 3 minutes and 25 seconds. It is a dance-pop song with a lively and rhythmical guitar and synth sounds. The song was produced by Full8loom who had previously worked with girl groups like Twice, Lovelyz and WJSN.

== Music video ==
The first teaser for the video was released on January 21 and it features the group members opening the door to another dimension where gravity works differently. The second teaser released on January 24 features the members primarily in school uniforms and performing in a disco hall. The teaser ends with a huge disco ball. The video was produced by Young-Ji Choi and directed by MIKA. Member Sakura Miyawaki confirmed that the video was shot in 2020 before the video for their single "Panorama". The official music video was released on the Universe app on January 28 and a preview of the video was released on YouTube the same day. The video features the members enter a new dimension as they unlock their anti-gravity powers. The full video was made available on Youtube on December 5.

== Charts ==
Chart performance for "D-D-Dance"
Chart (2021)	Peak position
South Korea (Gaon)	72
US World Digital Songs (Billboard)	25

== Release history ==
Release history and formats for "D-D-Dance"
Region	Date	Format	Label
Various	January 26, 2021	Digital download; streaming	Klap; Kakao M
