= Mnet vote manipulation investigation =

K-pop TV show scandal involving electoral fraud

- Native name: 엠넷의 서바이벌 프로그램 투표 조작 사건
- Date: July 19, 2019; 6 years ago
- Location: South Korea
- Arrests: Ahn Joon-young; Kim Yong-bum; Producer Lee; Starship Entertainment Executive Kim; Shin Hyung-kwan; 5 others
- Convicted: Ahn Joon-young; Kim Yong-bum; Producer Lee; Kim Shi-dae; Starship Entertainment Executive Kim; Lee; Ryu; Around Us Entertainment employee Kim

The South Korean television channel Mnet has been accused of electoral fraud in several of its reality competition series. Among them are the Produce 101 series and Idol School, which were intended to create K-pop groups with members selected by audience vote.

In July 2019, during the final episode of the Produce 101 series' fourth season, Produce X 101, several viewers suspected that the total votes were manipulated after noticing numerical patterns. On August 1, 2019, 272 viewers filed a lawsuit against Mnet, as their on-site text voting service charged ₩100 per vote, prompting an investigation led by the Seoul Metropolitan Police.

Ahn Joon-young and Kim Yong-bum, producers for the Produce 101 series, were arrested on November 5, 2019. Ahn later admitted to manipulating the rankings to all four seasons of the Produce 101 series. On December 3, 2019, Ahn, Kim, and six other entertainment agency representatives were indicted for charges including obstruction of business, fraud, and bribery. A court trial began on December 20, 2019.

The investigation has affected promotions for the groups produced by Mnet's franchises, with X1 later being disbanded by the agencies and Iz*One going on hiatus, as well as public perception of Mnet's ongoing competition reality series.

== Background ==
Iz*One (left) and Fromis 9 (right)
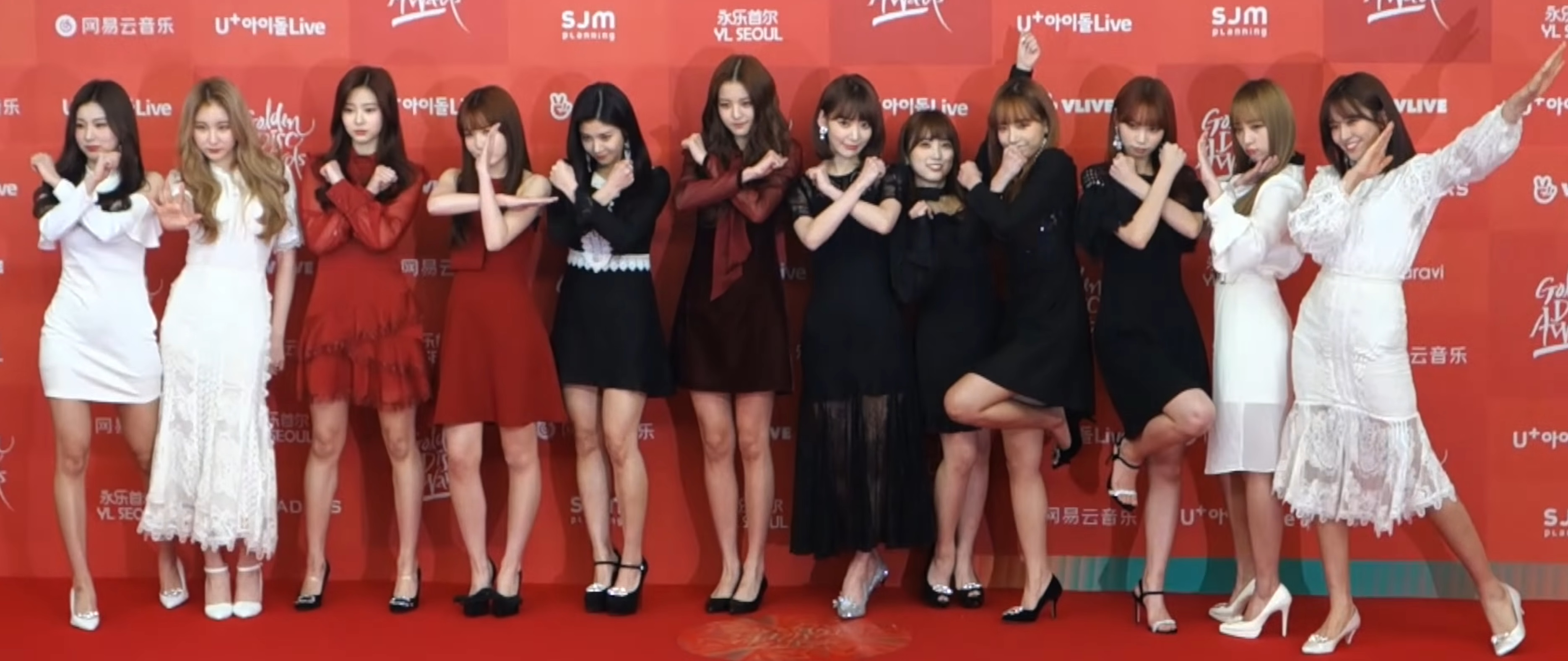
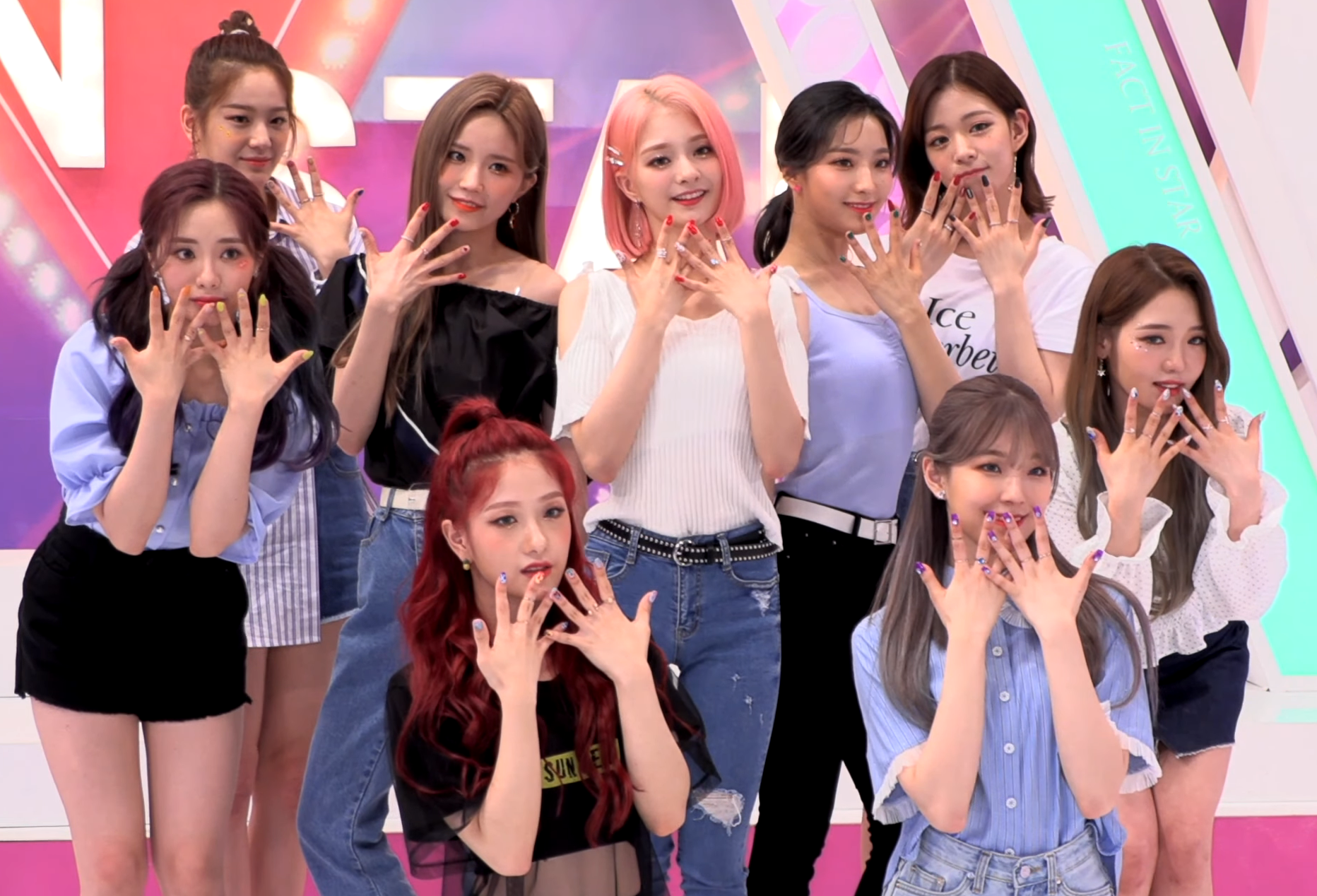

In 2009, South Korean cable television channel Mnet produced their first reality competition series, Superstar K, which immediately became popular, creating a boom of audition program franchises. In 2016, they launched Produce 101, aiming to create a short-term K-pop project group of 101 contestants with all 11 members selected by audience vote. The group formed from that show, I.O.I, was successful throughout their one-year contract, and due to their popularity, Mnet subsequently continued the series, creating its own franchise. The next two seasons, Produce 101 Season 2 and Produce 48 (a collaboration with the AKB48 Group), formed Wanna One and Iz*One respectively, with both groups finding individual success in the music market. The fourth season, Produce X 101, which was broadcast in 2019, created the group X1. In addition to the Produce 101 series, Mnet launched Idol School in 2017 with a similar premise, which created the girl group Fromis 9.

== Investigation ==
=== Incident and lawsuit ===
During the live broadcast of the final episode of Produce X 101 on July 19, 2019, several viewers suspected that Mnet had tampered with the total votes after noticing irregular patterns in the voting numbers. First, viewers noticed that when they compiled a list of the differences in the number of votes between each rank, a lot of them were the same. In particular, a difference of exactly 29,978 votes was observed five times. Furthermore, a difference of either 7,494 or 74,945 votes was observed six times. Viewers also realized that when the average individual vote count and divided that by 100, they got 7,494.442. They then realized that each of the top 20 individuals vote counts were a multiple of 7,494.442. Furthermore, viewers realized that by multiplying 7,494.442 by 2,000, they got the total number of votes. Some viewers then tried using the same formula on the individual vote counts of the final 20 Produce 48 members. This time, viewers realized that each of the top 20 individuals vote count were a multiple of 445.2178. In addition, they were able to get the total number of votes after multiplying 445.2178 by 10,000, rather than by 2,000. In response to the allegations, Mnet admitted that there were errors in calculation, but also maintained that the final rankings were correct and that there was no intention of changing X1's member line-up. Fourteen representatives from the entertainment agencies of the 20 finalists held a meeting on July 29, 2019, and agreed to support Produce X 101's outcome and X1's debut. On August 1, 2019, 272 viewers filed a lawsuit against Mnet for electoral fraud, as their on-site text voting service charged ₩100 per vote.

=== First police raids and witness allegations ===
On August 20, 2019, a search warrant was issued on CJ E&M offices and a text voting company by the Seoul Metropolitan Police Agency. During their first search, the police uncovered voice recordings of the staff members discussing vote manipulation on the previous seasons of the show, resulting in them extending their investigation to all four seasons of the Produce 101 series, Idol School, Show Me the Money, and Superstar K.

==== Produce X 101 ====
On October 1, 2019, the Seoul Metropolitan Police Agency confirmed that votes from eliminated trainees were added to the total votes of the members who debuted in X1, a process that affected 2-3 trainees who were originally in the top 11. The police issued a search and seizure warrant on the offices of Starship Entertainment, Woollim Entertainment, and MBK Entertainment. The police also investigated several agencies involved in Produce 48. Reportedly, per contract signed with CJ E&M, the entertainment agencies were paid ₩100,000 for every episode their talent appeared in. An anonymous trainee alleged only ₩1 million was given to their talent agencies for participating in a song, while each participant would only get a small percentage, and CJ E&M would keep additional profits if the song performed well. Some entertainment agencies who disagreed would request their talents to be eliminated at the last minute to withdraw them.

On October 15, 2019, MBC broadcast a feature on the vote rigging controversy on PD Note. Participants of Produce X 101 and Idol School and agency officials alleged anonymously that the production teams were biased towards trainees they preferred, such as forcing song producers to give certain trainees more lines and providing them with more screen time; one of them alleged that a contestant had his screen time completely removed after raising a complaint against a staff member, who had yelled at him to wake up. An anonymous trainee alleged that one trainee, under pressure from Starship Entertainment, was secretly informed about a mission in advance by one of the choreographers. He also alleged that some trainees knew the final rankings before the results were announced, and that a trainee from Woollim Entertainment was told by a representative that only one person from their company would debut in X1.

Two trainees alleged that the center position for the theme song, "X1-MA", was originally assigned to a different contestant chosen by trainee vote before the producers changed it to audience vote at the last minute. A fourth trainee claimed that many participants felt the show was biased towards trainees from Starship Entertainment. Staff members anonymously alleged that, for the final ranking results, only one off-site producer had counted the votes in a separate room and sent them the results via text message.

==== Idol School ====
On October 3, 2019, a trainee of Idol School alleged anonymously that only three to four of the 4,000 applicants had auditioned to appear on the show, indicating that the majority of the contestants did not have to go through an audition process to compete. In an interview with MBC, a trainee alleged that, throughout their six-month training period, the contestants were only given clothes appropriate for the summer and had to wear them in cold weather. In addition to that, they were cut off from outside communication, were only allowed to buy daily necessities once a month, and were not given enough food to eat.

During the October 15 broadcast of PD Note, several trainees anonymously claimed that their living quarters had poor ventilation and some girls developed rashes from dust. The trainees also claimed that they were so malnourished that some of them did not menstruate or had periods lasting for two months.

=== Bribery investigation, arrests, and indictments ===
On October 16, 2019, the police began investigating whether the producers had accepted money for manipulating the votes. On November 5, 2019, after approval from the Seoul National District Court, the police issued arrest warrants and travel bans for director Ahn Joon-young, chief producer Kim Yong-bum, a producer with the surname Lee, and Starship Entertainment's vice president Kim Kang-hyo, after they had attempted to destroy evidence. By evening, Ahn and Kim Yong-bum were arrested. During questioning, Ahn initially admitted to having manipulated the rankings for Produce 48 and Produce X 101 only, but he later also admitted to partially manipulating the rankings for the first two seasons as well.

On November 7, 2019, the police revealed that the final rankings of the top 20 trainees during Produce 48 and Produce X 101 had already been predetermined by the producers before the final performances were recorded and broadcast. A total of 10 people, including the previously reported four individuals, were arrested on November 12, 2019. One of the other six people arrested was Shin Hyung-kwan, the vice president of CJ ENM.

On December 3, 2019, Ahn, Kim Yong-bum, and Lee were indicted for obstruction of business and fraud; executives Kim Shi-dae and Kim (first name not revealed) from Starship Entertainment, former Woollim Entertainment employee Lee, former 8D Creative employee Ryu, and Around Us Entertainment employee Kim were indicted for bribery and violating the Improper Solicitation and Graft Act. The indictment revealed that Ahn and Kim Yong-bum had met with one other professional two days before the live finale of Produce X 101 to determine the final 11 members of X1 based on pre-finale online votes and had wanted to exclude contestants they did not prefer, particularly those who had already debuted in other groups. Ahn and Kim Yong-bum held a similar meeting in August 2018 before the live finale of Produce 48 to choose Iz*One's final 12 members. Ahn swapped rankings for one trainee who was supposed to debut in Wanna One. A later report mentioned that the indictment also revealed rankings for one trainee who was supposed to debut in I.O.I were swapped.

In addition to this, Ahn had also swapped rankings for other contestants in the earlier evaluations. One trainee from Produce X 101 had originally passed the first elimination had been swapped for another, while the same method was used for the third elimination. He also swapped rankings for two trainees from Produce 101 and one trainee from Produce 101 Season 2, all of whom had originally passed the first elimination. Ahn and Kim Yong-bum stated in the indictment that they had predetermined the line-up for Iz*One and X1 because they were pressured by Wanna One's success.

CJ ENM had earned ₩124.65 million from the paid text messaging votes from Produce 48 and Produce X 101. Police previously found that Ahn had used services from adult entertainment establishments in Gangnam. This was paid for 40 times by various talent agencies, beginning from the second half of 2018, the cost of which estimated to ₩100 million. The indictment, however, clarified that, from January 2018 to July 2019, Ahn received services 47 times, estimating ₩46.83 million, that were paid for by the five talent agency representatives in exchange for giving their trainees favorable screentime. In response to this report, 8D Creative stated that Ryu was no longer working for their agency and was being indicted for bribery on Produce X 101 through his own agency, Enfant Terrible. Around Us Entertainment stated that their employee Kim purchased alcohol for Ahn but they were not involved in bribery.

On February 14, 2020, the Seoul Metropolitan Police issued arrest warrants for two people who were on the production staff of Idol School.

== Trial ==
The first trial was held on December 20, 2019. During the trial, the defendants admitted to the charges while also requesting a closed trial to avoid disclosing the names of the trainees whose rankings were changed.

A second trial was held on January 14, 2020, and attended by the legal representatives of the defendants and the prosecution. Ahn and Kim, through their legal team, maintained that while they manipulated the rankings, their actions were not illegal. Han Dong-chul, the chief producer of the first season of Produce 101, and a staff member with the surname Park appeared at the hearing as witnesses; both had been suspected of manipulating the rankings for the first season of the show. The prosecution requested Lee Hae-in and another Produce 101 season 1 contestant as witnesses, but Lee's summoning was delayed and her lawyer stated that she would appear at the next hearing. Han and Park were also scheduled to be interrogated at the next hearing.

On February 7, 2020, all eight defendants were present. Ahn and Kim's lawyer stated that the votes were rigged in favor of the trainees from the first two seasons wanting to leave the program. In addition, Ahn claimed that while he violated the Improper Solicitation and Graft Act, he only drank with entertainment agency representatives without accepting bribes, a statement that was supported by the other defendants. The third hearing took place on March 6, 2020.

On November 18, 2020, the trial of appeals for the case of Produce 101 series was held, the court revealed the list of contestants who were eliminated due to manipulation.

== Sentencing ==
Final arguments were heard on 12 May 2020 with the prosecution requesting prison sentences of three years each for producing director (PD) Ahn Joon-young and chief producer (CP) Kim Yong-bum; two years for assistant PD Lee Mi-kyung; and one year for each of the five agency representatives charged with collusion.

The sentencing hearing took place on 29 May at Seoul District Court; all eight defendants heard guilty verdicts. PD Ahn Joon-young was fined ₩37 million and sentenced to two years; CP Kim Yong-beom was sentenced to 20 months; and assistant PD Lee Mi-kyung was fined ₩10 million. Agency representatives identified only as "Kim", "Lee", and "Ryu" were fined ₩7 million a piece, while two additional representatives both identified as "Kim" were each fined ₩5 million.

== Reactions ==
=== Mnet's response ===
Mnet issued an apology after the vote investigation allegations first broke in July 2019. Despite the backlash, in the midst of investigation, Mnet announced on October 21, 2019, that they were launching another reality competition series, Teen Singer, in 2020. On November 5, 2019, Mnet issued a statement mentioning that they were cooperating with the police after arrest warrants were issued. Following Ahn Joon-young and Kim Yong-bum's arrests, Mnet stated that their current and future reality programs, such as Queendom and Teen Singer, will be implementing an "observer system", where ordinary people and third parties will be overseeing the votes. In addition, their current program, World Klass, is implementing a system where winners will be selected through evaluations from industry experts and V Live votes, while removing paid text message voting. On November 18, 2019, Mnet announced they were withdrawing all four seasons of the Produce 101 series from video on demand services.

On December 3, 2019, Mnet issued another apology regarding the results of the investigation and announced that they will soon disclose future plans for Iz*One and X1. On December 18, 2019, Kang Ji-hoon, the contents operation manager at Mnet, announced that Mnet will no longer be producing audition programs and were discussing how to compensate trainees who were unfairly eliminated.

=== Impact on music acts ===
After the lawsuit was filed in August 2019, several brands cancelled their endorsement deals with X1 or put them on hold. The agencies of several of the members refused to sign contracts with CJ ENM until the allegations were cleared up. In spite of this, X1's debut proceeded as planned. After their appearance at the 2019 V Live Awards V Heartbeat was cancelled, Mnet announced that there were currently no plans for the group to promote.

Iz*One's first studio album, Bloom*Iz, was originally scheduled for release on November 11, 2019, with the lead single "Fiesta". Both the album and song were postponed after Ahn Joon-young's questioning on November 6. In addition, Iz*One's showcases, promotions, and several guest appearances were cancelled or put on hold, as well as their concert film, Eyes on Me: The Movie. On November 28, 2019, Iz*One's Japanese promotions were also suspended, including Sakura Miyawaki and Hitomi Honda's individual radio shows. On December 4, 2019, Iz*One's official Japanese fan club suspended activity, closing registrations for new members and refunding current members.

On December 30, 2019, Mnet and CJ ENM announced that both Iz*One and X1 will begin discussing future plans for the groups, and that the eliminated trainees will be fairly compensated. Both Iz*One and X1 were dropped from the nominations for the 34th Golden Disc Awards. On January 6, 2020, X1 disbanded after the members' agencies failed to reach an agreement on the group's future, while the agencies of Iz*One's members agreed to continue promoting. Iz*One disbanded on April 29, 2021.

=== Public response ===
Following initial accusations in July 2019, politician Ha Tae-keung (Bareunmirae member at the time, now with People Power Party) condemned Mnet, stating that some of the numbers had a low probability of naturally occurring. On October 17, 2019, Korea Communications Standards Commission revealed that they may fine Mnet up to ₩30 million for violating the Enforcement Decree of the Broadcasting Act.

The production committee for Produce 101 Japan, the 2019 Japanese spin-off of the original Produce 101 franchise, stated on their official website that they are not affiliated with the Korean production team and have a separate voting system, with votes analyzed by a group of third-party lawyers.

After Ahn Joon-young admitted the first two seasons of the show were rigged, an image that Mnet had posted on their official Facebook account coinciding with the finale of Produce 101 Season 2 went viral. The image had originally included Kang Dong-ho, Samuel Kim, and Kim Jong-hyun as the winners of the show instead of Yoon Ji-sung, Kim Jae-hwan and Ha Sung-woon, but Mnet had stated it was a mistake and deleted it shortly after posting it.

==== Responses from contestants ====
In October 2019, the father of Lee Hae-in, a contestant on the first season of Produce 101 and Idol School, alleged through her fan site that CJ ENM suggested during her audition that she sign with their subsidiary agency to ensure that she would be able to debut after elimination, and she had done so out of fear of not being accepted into Idol School. However, after being eliminated, CJ ENM did not follow up and she was unable to sign contracts with other agencies, before finally signing up with The Groove Company in 2020. In response, CJ ENM issued an apology. Following the news, Lee revealed on Instagram and on the October 15 broadcast of PD Note the poor conditions she and other contestants worked under.

After Ahn Joon-young and Kim Yong-bum's arrests, Shiori Niwa, another contestant of the first season, posted and later deleted tweets alleging that some of the trainees already knew the lyrics and choreography to "Pick Me" by the time she heard it. Jung Dong-soo, a contestant of Produce 101 Season 2, called for the culprits to be punished and later stated that, while he had suspected the ranks were manipulated, he was "shocked" and "angry". At the same time, both voiced support for all trainees in the show. Lee Dae-hwi and Park Hee-seok, who were also contestants on Produce 101 Season 2, voiced their support for Iz*One and X1.
