= One-reeler / Act IV =

- Digital and "Scene #2 Becoming One version" cover

EP by Iz*One
- Released: December 7, 2020
- Recorded: November 2020
- Genres: K-pop; electropop
- Language: Korean
- Labels: Off the Record; Swing Entertainment
- Producers: Jung Ho-hyun; Ung Kim; FAB; NZ; Nthonius; Yoske; Alive Knob; Sean Oh; Score; Megatone; Eden; Iggy; Yongbae

Iz*One chronology
Twelve (2020)	One-reeler / Act IV (2020)

Singles from One-reeler
- 1. "Panorama" Released: December 7, 2020

One-reeler / Act IV is the fourth and final extended play by South Korean–Japanese girl group Iz*One. It was released through Off the Record Entertainment on December 7, 2020. The album is available in three versions: Scene #1, Scene #2 and Scene #3, and consists of six tracks including the lead single, "Panorama".

== Background and release ==
In early November, it was announced that Iz*One would be having a comeback before the end of the year. On November 17, it was confirmed that the group would release their fourth mini-album One-reeler / Act IV on December 7. Group teaser photos and individual photos began to release from November 23 onwards, showing three different concepts titling, 'The Color of Youth', 'Becoming One' and 'Stay Bold'. The first teaser image that shows a ticket with all of the members' names, along with the words "One-reeler: Act IV." The photo also features the album release date. Apart from this, a clip was also uploaded, and it presents a screen with a date that seems to be displayed through a projector. The first music video teaser was released a week later on December 2, with the highlight medley being released on the next day. Their second music video teaser was released on December 4. The clip was about 30 seconds and shows individual shots of the members while the instrumental version of "Panorama" was being played as a music background.

Fans wait in anticipation for new music to come from IZ*ONE, which has finished the 'Flower' series with "La Vie en Rose" (2018), "Violeta" (2019) and "Fiesta" (2020), followed by the mystical vibe of "Secret Story of the Swan" (2020)

— Swing Entertainment announcing One Reeler/Act IV

== Promotion ==
The group held a two-hour premier titled "IZ*ONE One-reeler Premiere" on December 7 at 6 p.m. KST that was broadcast globally through K-Pop channels such as Mnet, M2, and Mnet Kpop, as well as through different social media platforms including Stone Music's YouTube channel, Iz*One's TikTok, VLive and YouTube channel. The group also performed "Panorama" and "Sequence" during the premiere.

The group premiered "Panorama" with a performance at the 2020 Mnet Asian Music Awards on December 6.

== Commercial performance ==
The group achieved a double crown on the week ending December 12 after topping both the physical album chart with the mini-album and the digital download chart with its title track "Panorama". The mini-album became the group second project to top the Korean albums chart after Heart*Iz (2019). Not only did the mini album debut at number one on the week's physical album chart, but the "Kit version" of the album also entered the chart separately at number five. Despite being a Korean release, the mini-album entered the top ten of the Japanese Oricon albums chart peaking at number eight.

== Track listing ==
One-reeler / Act IV track listing
No.	Title	Lyrics	Music	Arrangement	Length
1.	"Mise-en-Scène"	Jung Ho-hyun (e.one)	Jung Ho-hyun (e.one)	Jung Ho-hyun (e.one)	3:19
2.	"Panorama"	KZ; B.O.; FAB	KZ; Nthonius; B.O.; FAB; Jayins; Ji Ye-joon	Ung Kim; FAB; KZ; Nthonius	3:42
3.	"Island"	YOSKE; Alive Knob	YOSKE; Alive Knob	YOSKE; Alive Knob; Sean Oh	3:13
4.	"Sequence"	Jung Ho-hyun (e.one)	Jung Ho-hyun (e.one)	Jung Ho-hyun (e.one)	3:10
5.	"O Sole Mio"	SCORE (13); MEGATONE (13); EDEN (13)	SCORE (13); MEGATONE (13); EDEN (13)	SCORE (13); MEGATONE (13); EDEN (13)	3:30
6.	"Slow Journey" (느린 여행; Neurin yeohaeng)	Iggy; Yongbae; Kim Chae-won	Iggy; Yongbae; Kim	Iggy; Yongbae	3:19
Total length:					20:13

== Charts ==
Sales chart performance of One-reeler / Act IV
Chart (2020)	Peak position
Japan Hot Albums (Billboard Japan)	11
Japanese Albums (Oricon)	8
South Korean Albums (Gaon)	1

== Certification and sales ==
Region	Certification	Certified units/sales
South Korea	—	450,549

== Release history ==
Region	Date	Format	Label
South Korea	December 7, 2020	CD; digital download; streaming	Off the Record Entertainment; Stone Music Entertainment
Various	December 7, 2020	Digital download; streaming	Off the Record Entertainment; Stone Music Entertainment
