= Bloom*Iz =

- Digital and "I*Will" version cover

Studio album by Iz*One
- Released: February 17, 2020
- Recorded: September – October 2019
- Genres: K-pop; synth-pop; bubblegum pop
- Length: 40:31
- Language: Korean
- Labels: Off the Record; Stone Music; Genie

Iz*One chronology
Heart*Iz (2019)	Bloom*Iz (2020)	Oneiric Diary (2020)

Singles from Bloom*Iz
- 1. "Fiesta" Released: February 17, 2020

Bloom*Iz (pronounced "bloom eyes") is the first and only Korean-language studio album by South Korean–Japanese girl group Iz*One, a project group formed through the 2018 Mnet reality competition show Produce 48. The album was released on February 17, 2020 by Off the Record Entertainment and distributed by Stone Music Entertainment and Genie Music. It features 12 tracks, including the lead single "Fiesta".

The album was originally scheduled for release on November 11, 2019, but it was postponed following the Mnet vote manipulation investigation, it was the group's first full-length album since their debut in October 2018, and their first Korean release since Heart*Iz the previous year.

The album is available in three different versions: "I Was", "I Am", and "I Will".

== Release ==
On October 29, 2019, a concept trailer titled "When Iz Your Blooming Moment?" was uploaded on the group's YouTube channel. Its concept, featuring flowers in full bloom and the members in various states of waking, was called "colorful and sensual". The group's official website was also re-branded. The track listing was revealed through the group's social media on November 3. However, following the Mnet vote manipulation investigation, where the Produce 48 producer Ahn Joon-young admitted he had manipulated the rankings for Produce 48 during his November 5 arrest, Off the Record announced that the album's release had been postponed.

On January 23, 2020, an official statement from Mnet was released, stating that promotions for Iz*One, including the release of Bloom*Iz, would resume in mid-February. On February 2, Iz*One's official Twitter account announced the release of Bloom*Iz for February 17, 2020. Three days later, Mnet M2MPD's Twitter account revealed that the group's comeback showcase will be aired simultaneously on Mnet, M2, and Stone Music's YouTube and Facebook. Over February 6–7, unreleased photos of the members were revealed as part of their early promotions for the upcoming comeback.

== Promotion ==
Iz*One promoted the single "Fiesta" on the music shows M Countdown, Music Bank, Music Core, Inkigayo, The Show, and Show Champion which started on February 17.

== Critical reception ==
Billboard described the title track "Fiesta" as a "festive synth pop song which takes its name to heart with the sliding, synth pop throbber of a track that explodes into a brass led dance breakdown" and reported that the mixed emotions portrayed in the other tracks of the album show power in the group coming together in moments of collective delicate vulnerability.

Kat Moon of Time named the album as one of the best K-pop releases of 2020 noticing how fierce and bold girl crush image has become increasingly popular in K-pop but Iz*One's image has stayed unapologetically sweet and cute. She called the album a welcome addition to the group's "kaleidoscopic" discography describing how the album showcases the group at its best, serving up a sonic palette of colors that demonstrates the varied hues and tints in bubblegum pop.

== Commercial performance ==
The album topped in its first week of pre-order availability across various Korean and Japanese websites, including Aladin, Yes24, and Tower Records. In addition, the album topped the Japanese Tower Records online pre-order chart and Synnara Records' real-time chart in 2019 with 150,000 sales six days before its release. However, the release was postponed following the Mnet vote manipulation investigation, and orders were cancelled and refunded.

On February 17, on their first day of sales, Iz*One took the record for the most albums sold on the first day for a girl group, with about 184,000 copies sold. The album also broke the record of girl group's first week sales on Hanteo, with 356,313 copies sold on its first 7 days. This record stood until it was broken by the group's next album four months later.

== Track listing ==
Bloom*Iz track listing
No.	Title	Lyrics	Music	Arrangement	Length
1.	"Eyes"	Jo Yoon-kyung, Andy Love, Andreas Öberg, David Amber, Ryan S. Jhun	Andy Love, Andreas Öberg, David Amber, Ryan S. Jhun	David Amber	3:37
2.	"Fiesta"	Seo Ji-eum, Go Hyun-jung (JamFactory), Choi Hyun-joon, Kim Seung-soo	Choi Hyun-joon, Kim Seung-soo	Choi Hyun-joon, Kim Seung-soo	3:37
3.	"Dreamlike" (Kwon Eun-bi, Sakura Miyawaki, Kang Hye-won, Choi Ye-na, Hitomi Honda, Jang Won-young)	Jang Won-young, Yoon Sang-jo, Kang Yeon-wook	Yoon Sang-jo, Kang Yeon-wook	Yoon Sang-jo, Kang Yeon-wook	3:46
4.	"Ayayaya" (Kwon Eun-bi, Sakura Miyawaki, Kang Hye-won, Lee Chae-yeon, Kim Chae-won, Kim Min-ju, Nako Yabuki, Jo Yu-ri, An Yu-jin)	Inner Child (MonoTree)	Yoon Jong-sung (MonoTree), Anna Timgren, Shin Min-kyung	Yoon Jong-sung (MonoTree), Shin Min-kyung	3:22
5.	"So Curious" (Choi Ye-na, Lee Chae-yeon, Kim Chae-won, Kim Min-ju, Nako Yabuki, Hitomi Honda, Jo Yu-ri, An Yu-jin, Jang Won-young)	Tenzo, Kebee	Tenzo, MUNA, Loogone, Shaun Kim	MUNA, Loogone	3:22
6.	"Spaceship"	Kwon Eun-bi, Elum (Prismfilter), Anchor (Prismfilter)	Kwon Eun-bi, Nmore (Prismfilter), Elum (Prismfilter), Anchor (Prismfilter)	Nmore (Prismfilter)	2:51
7.	"Destiny" (우연이 아니야; Uyeon-i aniya; lit. Not a Coincidence)	Iggy, Yongbae, Lee Seu-ran	Iggy, Yongbae	Iggy, Yongbae	3:21
8.	"You & I"	Kim Hyun-ah, Kim Min-ju	Park Tae-jin	Park Tae-jin	3:24
9.	"Daydream" (Kwon Eun-bi, Lee Chae-yeon, Kim Min-ju, An Yu-jin)	danke (Lalala Studio), Min Yeon-jae	AiRPLAY, Nash Overstreet, Sidnie Tipton	AiRPLAY	3:23
10.	"Pink Blusher" (Sakura Miyawaki, Kang Hye-won, Nako Yabuki, Hitomi Honda, Jang Won-young)	Boombastic	Boombastic	Boombastic	3:14
11.	"Someday" (언젠가 우리의 밤도 지나가겠죠; Eonjenga uriui bamdo jinagagetjyo; lit. Someday Our Night Will Pass (Choi Ye-na, Kim Chae-won, Jo Yu-ri))	Jo Yu-ri	Jo Yu-ri, Nmore (Prismfilter), Building Owner (Prismfilter)	Nmore (Prismfilter), Building Owner (Prismfilter)	3:17
12.	"Open Your Eyes"	Black Edition, EastWest, Bull$EyE, yuka (Full8loom)	Black Edition, EastWest, Bull$EyE, yuka (Full8loom)	EastWest, Bull$EyE, yuka (Full8loom)	3:17
Total length:					40:44

== Charts ==
Chart performance of Bloom*lz
Chart (2020)	Peak position
Japan Hot Albums (Billboard Japan)	6
Japanese Albums (Oricon)	3
South Korean Albums (Gaon)	2
US World Albums (Billboard)	15

== Certifications and sales ==
Certifications and sales for Bloom*Iz
Region	Certification	Certified units/sales
South Korea (KMCA)	Platinum	250,000^{^}
^{^} Shipments figures based on certification alone.
