= Love Berry =

Japanese fashion magazine

- Cover of August 2010 issue
- Categories: Fashion
- Frequency: Monthly(December 2001 - February 2012)→Bimonthly(August 2016 - )
- Publisher: Tokuma Shoten
- First issue: 1 December 2001; December 25, 2015
- Final issue: 1 February 2012
- Country: Japan
- Based in: Tokyo
- Language: Japanese
- Website: https://www.love-berry.net/

Love Berry (ラブベリー, Rabuberi) was a monthly fashion magazine published in Tokyo by Tokuma Shoten. The magazine targets girls from early- to mid-teens. The magazine was known for its models (called LoveBerrina). Love Berry is often abbreviated LB.

== History and profile ==
Love Berry was started in 2001. The magazine was usually published on the first of every month. On 5 December 2011, Love Berry announced on its blog that Meredith had discontinued the magazine.

== Models ==
=== Current (Lovemo) ===
Exclusive models as of December 2017.

- Koharu Itō (Fuwa Fuwa)
- Hina Hiratsuka (Fuwa Fuwa)
- Yuriya Kimura
- Kokoro Kurokawa
- Maria Makino (Morning Musume)
- Ruka Mishima (The World Standard)
- Riko Nakayama (Shiritsu Ebisu Chugaku)
- Yūno Ōhara
- Yui Oguri (AKB48)
- Rion Seki
- Miku Tanaka (HKT48)
- Nako Yabuki (HKT48)

=== Former (LoveBerrina) ===
- Hau Dan (June 2009 – February 2011)

== See also ==
- Pichi Lemon
- Nicola
