= Vampire (Iz*One song) =

2019 single by Iz*One

- Type A cover

Single by Iz*One

from the album Twelve
- Language: Japanese
- Released: September 25, 2019
- Genre: J-pop
- Label: EMI; Universal Japan
- Producer(s): Yasushi Akimoto

Iz*One singles chronology
"Buenos Aires" (2019)	"Vampire" (2019)	"Fiesta" (2020)

Music video
- "Vampire" on YouTube

"Vampire" is the third Japanese single by South Korean–Japanese girl group Iz*One. It was released in Japan by EMI Records on September 25, 2019.

== Lyrics ==
The lyrics of the song talk about wanting to be a vampire so the members can turn a love they long for into an invulnerable one.

== Track listing ==
Physical releases include DVDs with music video for the title track.

All lyrics written by Yasushi Akimoto. Track "Love Bubble" is written by Cho Yoon-kyung, Sakura Miyawaki and Kim Min-ju.

Type A
No.	Title	Music	Arrangement	Length
1.	"Vampire"	Chocolate Mix	Chocolate Mix	3:48
2.	"Kimi Igai" (君以外)	Hara Kazuhiro	Hara Kazuhiro	3:32
3.	"Love Bubble"	Dro, Bin, Capitalist	Dro	3:17

Type A – physical edition
No.	Title	Length
4.	"Vampire" (Instrumental)	3:48
5.	"Kimi Igai" (Instrumental)	3:32
6.	"Love Bubble" (Instrumental)	3:17

Type A – DVD
No.	Title	Director(s)	Length
1.	"Vampire" (Music video)	Takahiro Shiraishi
2.	"Our Time [first part]" (Special Video)

Type B
No.	Title	Music	Arrangement	Length
1.	"Vampire"	Chocolate Mix	Chocolate Mix	3:48
2.	"Kimi Igai"	Hara Kazuhiro	Hara Kazuhiro	3:32
3.	"Shigaisen Nanka Buttobase" (紫外線なんかぶっとばせ)	Maesako Junya, Rikimaru Takeru	Rikimaru Takeru	4:13

Type B – physical edition
No.	Title	Length
4.	"Vampire" (Instrumental)	3:48
5.	"Kimi Igai" (Instrumental)	3:32
6.	"Shigaisen Nanka Buttobase" (Instrumental)	4:13

Type B – DVD
No.	Title	Director(s)	Length
1.	"Vampire" (Music video)	Takahiro Shiraishi
2.	"Our Time [last part]" (Special Video)
3.	"Making of Vampire Music Video"

Wiz*One Edition
No.	Title	Music	Arrangement	Length
1.	"Vampire"	Chocolate Mix	Chocolate Mix	3:48
2.	"Kimi Igai"	Hara Kazuhiro	Hara Kazuhiro	3:32
3.	"Fushigi Lucy" (不機嫌Lucy)	Chocolate Mix, The Show	Chocolate Mix, The Show	3:33

Wiz*One – physical edition
No.	Title	Length
4.	"Vampire" (Instrumental)	3:48
5.	"Kimi Igai" (Instrumental)	3:32
6.	"Fushigi Lucy" (Instrumental)	3:33

== Charts ==
Weekly charts
Chart (2019)	Peak position
Japan (Japan Hot 100)	1
Japan (Oricon)	1
South Korea (K-pop Hot 100)	52

Year-end charts
Chart (2019)	Position
Japan (Japan Hot 100)	84

== Certifications ==
Region	Certification	Certified units/sales
Japan (RIAJ)	Gold	100,000^{^}
^{^} Shipments figures based on certification alone.
