= Buenos Aires (Iz*One song) =

2019 single by Iz*One

- Type A cover

Single by Iz*One

from the album Twelve
- Language: Japanese
- Released: June 26, 2019
- Genre: J-pop
- Length: 4:20
- Label: EMI; Universal Japan
- Producer(s): Yasushi Akimoto

Iz*One singles chronology
| "Violeta" (2019) | "Buenos Aires" (2019) | "Vampire" (2019) |

Music video
- "Buenos Aires" on YouTube

"Buenos Aires" is the second Japanese single by South Korean–Japanese girl group Iz*One. It was released in Japan by EMI Records on June 26, 2019.

== Promotion ==
On May 3, was revealed that Iz*One would release their second Japanese single. "Buenos Aires" was released in 16 editions: two regular CD+DVD editions, a limited WIZ*ONE CD edition sold on Iz*One's official Japanese web store that comes with one photo and event participation, twelve CD member solo jacket editions that come with one member photo, and a CD box set edition that includes the WIZ*ONE edition and all member editions.

The music video teaser for "Buenos Aires" was released on May 27.

== Track listing ==
Physical releases include DVDs with music videos for the title track and one B-side. Credits adapted from Spotify.

All lyrics written and songs produced by Yasushi Akimoto.

Type A
| No. | Title | Music | Arrangement | Length |
|---|---|---|---|---|
| 1. | "Buenos Aires" | Miki Watanabe | Miki Watanabe | 4:20 |
| 2. | "Tomorrow" | GRP; NIYA | GRP | 3:05 |
| 3. | "Target" | Daisuke Mori | Daisuke Mori | 3:41 |

Type A – physical edition
| No. | Title | Length |
|---|---|---|
| 4. | "Buenos Aires" (Instrumental) | 4:20 |
| 5. | "Tomorrow" (Instrumental) | 3:05 |
| 6. | "Target" (Instrumental) | 3:41 |

Type A – DVD
| No. | Title | Director(s) | Length |
|---|---|---|---|
| 1. | "Buenos Aires" (Music video) | Kyotaro Hayashi |
| 2. | "Target" (Music video) |

Type B
| No. | Title | Music | Arrangement | Length |
|---|---|---|---|---|
| 1. | "Buenos Aires" | Miki Watanabe | Miki Watanabe | 4:20 |
| 2. | "Tomorrow" | GRP; NIYA | GRP | 3:05 |
| 3. | "Toshishita Boyfriend" (年下Boyfriend; lit. Younger Boyfriend) | Yūsuke Itagaki | APAZZI | 3:53 |

Type B – physical edition
| No. | Title | Length |
|---|---|---|
| 4. | "Buenos Aires" (Instrumental) | 4:20 |
| 5. | "Tomorrow" (Instrumental) | 3:05 |
| 6. | "Toshishita Boyfriend" (Instrumental) | 3:53 |

Type B – DVD
| No. | Title | Director(s) | Length |
|---|---|---|---|
| 1. | "Buenos Aires" (Music video) | Kyotaro Hayashi |
| 2. | "Toshishita Boyfriend" (Music video) |

Wiz*One edition
| No. | Title | Music | Arrangement | Length |
|---|---|---|---|---|
| 1. | "Buenos Aires" | Miki Watanabe | Miki Watanabe | 4:20 |
| 2. | "Tomorrow" | GRP; NIYA | GRP | 3:05 |
| 3. | "Human Love" | Takafumi Fujino | APAZZI | 3:57 |

Wiz*One – physical edition
| No. | Title | Length |
|---|---|---|
| 4. | "Buenos Aires" (Instrumental) | 4:20 |
| 5. | "Tomorrow" (Instrumental) | 3:05 |
| 6. | "Human Love" (Instrumental) | 3:57 |

== Charts ==
Weekly charts
| Chart (2019) | Peak position |
|---|---|
| Japan (Japan Hot 100) | 1 |
| Japan (Oricon) | 1 |

Year-end charts
| Chart (2019) | Position |
|---|---|
| Japan (Japan Hot 100) | 93 |

== Certifications ==
| Region | Certification | Certified units/sales |
|---|---|---|
| Japan (RIAJ) | Platinum | 250,000^{^} |
^{^} Shipments figures based on certification alone.
