= Nako Yabuki =

Japanese actress (born 2001)

- 矢吹 奈子
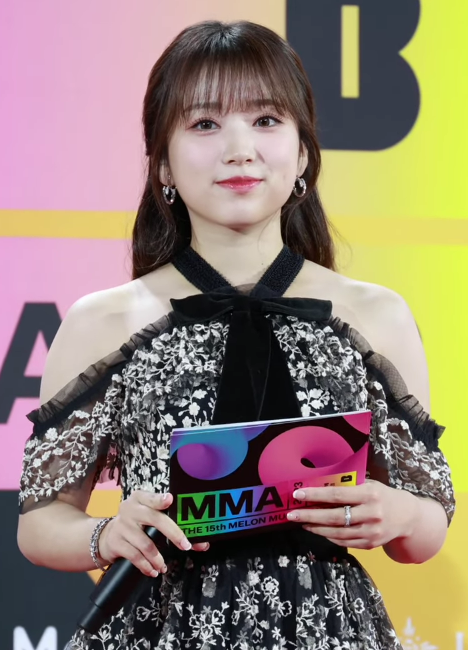
- Yabuki in December 2023 at the 2023 Melon Music Awards
- Born: 18 June 2001 (age 25); Setagaya, Tokyo, Japan
- Occupation: Actress
- Years active: 2005–present
- Agent: Twin Planet
- Musical career
- Genres: J-pop; K-pop
- Instrument: Vocals
- Years active: 2013–2023
- Labels: EMI Records (Note: As a member of HKT48 only.); Off The Record (Note: As a member of Iz*One only.); Vernalossom
- Formerly of: AKB48; Iz*One; HKT48

Japanese name
- Kanji: 矢吹 奈子
- Hiragana: やぶき なこ
- Romanization: Yabuki Nako

Korean name
- Hangul: 야부키 나코
- Revised Romanization: Yabuki Nako
- McCune–Reischauer: Yabuk'i Nak'o

Nako Yabuki (矢吹 奈子; born 18 June 2001) is a Japanese actress and former singer. She is a former member of the Japanese idol girl group HKT48 and the South Korean-Japanese girl group Iz*One, having finished sixth in the competition television show Produce 48. As an actress, she is known for her role as young Minami Asakura in the film Touch (2005).

She joined HKT48 in November 2013, and was a concurrent member of AKB48 from 2015 to 2017. She is an exclusive model for Japanese magazine Love Berry since 2016.

== Career ==
Yabuki made her film debut as young Minami Asakura in the coming-of-age film Touch in 2005. Two years later, she appeared in JCB and Dainichi (ja) commercials. In 2009, she appeared in the made for television films Detective Samonji Susumu and My Father's Longest Day. She appeared in a Koala's March commercial in 2011. In 2012, she appeared in the short film On the Shinhori River. The following year, she appeared in the tokusatsu superhero film Gatchaman.

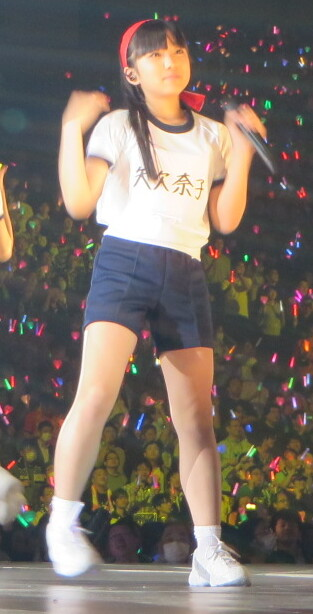
Yabuki during an AKB48 performance in 2012

Yabuki is a fan of Rino Sashihara. During an AKB48 handshake event, she met Sashihara, who told her to audition for the group. Yabuki decided to audition for HKT48 instead, after Sashihara was demoted and transferred to HKT48. In 2013, she passed the third generation auditions for HKT48.

In 2018, Nako participated in reality girl group survival show Produce 48, and after ranking #6 in the final ranking, she placed in the top twelve, and became a member of Korean-Japanese idol group Iz*One. She and the other two Japanese members of the group took a hiatus from their respective Japanese groups until their contracts with Iz*One expired in April 2021.

On April 29, 2021, her contract with Iz*One officially expired and she and the other two Japanese members returned to Japan. On May 15, 2021, Nako officially resumed HKT48 activities with a theater appearance.

On October 16, 2022, during HKT48's 11th-anniversary concert, she announced her graduation from the group with a graduation concert which was held on April 1, 2023. After graduation, she continued her career as an actress.

On January 28, 2023, Yabuki's contract with Vernalossom expired. On June 18, it was announced that Yabuki had signed on with Twin Planet.

== AKB48 general election placements ==
Since her debut in 2013, Yabuki has taken part in five of AKB48's annual general elections. Her placements were as follows :

Edition	Year	Final rank	Number of votes	Position on single	Single
6	2014	Not ranked	Not ranked	Not ranked	Not ranked
7	2015	Not ranked	Not ranked	Not ranked	Not ranked
8	2016	28	28,276	Undergirls	Densetsu no Sakana
9	2017	37	25,364	Next Girls	Tomadotte Tameratte
10	2018	9	51,650	Senbatsu	Sentimental Train

== Discography ==
=== Songwriting credits ===
Year	Song	Album	With
2020	"Secret Story of the Swan (Japanese Ver.)"	Oneiric Diary	MosPick, Sakura Miyawaki
2020	"Violeta (Japanese Ver.)"	Twelve	Seung-soo

== Filmography ==
=== Film ===
Year	Title	Role	Notes	Ref.
2005	Touch	young Minami Asakura		
2012	On the Shinhori River		Short film	
2013	Gatchaman	Dr. Nambu's daughter		
2022	The Mukoda Barber Shop	Shizuku Ōhara		
2025	My Special One	Emi Nanase		

=== Television series ===
Year	Title	Role	Notes	Ref.
2009	Detective Samonji Susumu	young Natsume	Television film	
2009	My Father's Longest Day		Television film	
2015	Fukuoka Love White Paper	Wakana		
2015	Majisuka Gakuen 0: Kisaradzu Rantō-hen	Namaiki		
2016	AKB Love Night Love Factory	Rin	Episode: "Graduation"	
2021	Kao Dake Sensei	Sanjo Aika		
2022	Convenience Store Heroes	Mizuki Shimamura	Cameo	
2022	Kasouken no Onna Season 22	Fukawa Misato	Cameo	
2023	Numaru. Minato-ku Joshikosei	Yuzuki Kotona		
2023	Iyashi no Otonari-san ni wa Himitsu ga aru	Tanabe Manami		
2023	18-sai, Niizuma, Furin Shimasu	Sanjo Meika		
2023	Renai no Susume	Takada Hanako		
2025	Mr. Mikami's Classroom	Nao Hareyama		

=== Television shows ===
Year	Title	Role	Notes	Ref.
2018	Produce 48	Contestant	Finished 6th	
2022–2023	The Idol Band: Boy's Battle	Host	with Rowoon	
2023	Produce 101 Japan The Girls	Ambassador		

=== Hosting ===
Year	Title	Notes	Ref.
2022	Gala Show 2022 Asia Artist Awards	with Hwang Min-hyun	

== Bibliography ==
=== Magazines ===
- Love Berry, Tokuma Shoten (2001), exclusive model since 2016.
