= Suki to Iwasetai =

2019 single by Iz*One

- Type A cover

Single by Iz*One

from the album Twelve
- Language: Japanese
- Released: February 5, 2019
- Genre: J-pop
- Label: EMI; Universal Japan
- Producer: Yasushi Akimoto

Iz*One singles chronology
"La Vie en Rose" (2018)	"Suki to Iwasetai" (2019)	"Rise" (2019)

Music video
- "Suki to Iwasetai (好きと言わせたい)" on YouTube

"Suki to Iwasetai" (好きと言わせたい; lit. "Tell Me You Love Me") is the Japanese debut single by South Korean–Japanese girl group Iz*One, a project group formed through the 2018 Mnet reality competition show Produce 48. It was released in Japan by EMI Records on February 6, 2019.

== Promotion ==
Iz*One held their Japanese debut showcase at Tokyo Dome City Hall on January 20, 2019.

== Music video ==
The music video was released on January 25, 2019, and achieved more than 1.7 million views in the first 24 hours of its release on YouTube. It exceeded more than 5 million views within six days of its release.

== Commercial performance ==
"Suki to Iwasetai" debuted atop the daily ranking of the Oricon Singles Chart on its first day with 193,469 physical copies sold. With this, Iz*One also set the highest first day sales for a female Korean group, surpassing Twice's "Wake Me Up". It ended up at number 2 on the weekly Oricon Singles Chart with 221,640 units sold, while Billboard Japan recorded 303,745 sales from February 4 to February 10, 2019.

== Track listing ==
Physical releases include DVDs with music videos for the title track and one B-side.

All lyrics are written by Yasushi Akimoto.

Suki to Iwasetai – special edition
No.	Title	Music	Arrangement	Length
1.	"Suki to Iwasetai" (好きと言わせたい; lit. Tell Me You Love Me)	Chocolate Mix	Apazzi	3:59
2.	"Kenchanayo" (ケンチャナヨ; lit. It's OK)	no_my	no_my	4:16
3.	"Gokigen Sayonara" (ご機嫌サヨナラ; lit. Happy Goodbye)	Toshihiko Watanabe	Toshihiko Watanabe; Hirotaka Hayakawa	4:22
4.	"Neko ni Naritai" (猫になりたい; lit. I Wanna Be a Cat)	Shintaro Fujiwara	Shintaro Fujiwara	4:16
5.	"Dance o Omoidasumade" (ダンスを思い出すまで; lit. Until You Remember Our Dance)	Yurika Ohishi	Yurika Ohishi	4:33
Total length:				21:26

Suki to Iwasetai – Type A digital download
No.	Title	Music	Arrangement	Length
1.	"Suki to Iwasetai"	Chocolate Mix	Apazzi	4:01
2.	"Kenchanayo"	no_my	no_my	4:19
3.	"Gokigen Sayonara"	Toshihiko Watanabe	Toshihiko Watanabe; Hirotaka Hayakawa	4:25
Total length:				12:45

Suki to Iwasetai – Type A physical edition
No.	Title	Music	Arrangement	Length
4.	"Suki to Iwasetai" (Instrumental)	Chocolate Mix	Apazzi	4:02
5.	"Kenchanayo" (Instrumental)	no_my	no_my	4:18
6.	"Gokigen Sayonara" (Instrumental)	Toshihiko Watanabe	Toshihiko Watanabe; Hayakawa Hirotaka	4:23
Total length:				12:43

Suki to Iwasetai – Type A DVD
No.	Title	Director(s)	Length
1.	"Suki to Iwasetai" (Music video)	Kazuma Ikeda
2.	"Gokigen Sayonara" (Music video)	EPOCH
Total length:			0

Suki to Iwasetai – Type B digital download
No.	Title	Music	Arrangement	Length
1.	"Suki to Iwasetai"	Chocolate Mix	Apazzi	4:01
2.	"Kenchanayo"	no_my	no_my	4:19
3.	"Neko ni Naritai"	Shintaro Fujiwara	Shintaro Fujiwara	4:19
Total length:				12:39

Suki to Iwasetai – Type B physical edition
No.	Title	Music	Arrangement	Length
4.	"Suki to Iwasetai" (Instrumental)	Chocolate Mix	Apazzi	4:02
5.	"Kenchanayo" (Instrumental)	no_my	no_my	4:18
6.	"Neko ni Naritai" (Instrumental)	Shintaro Fujiwara	Shintaro Fujiwara	4:16
Total length:				12:36

Suki to Iwasetai – Type B DVD
No.	Title	Director(s)	Length
1.	"Suki to Iwasetai" (Music video)	Kazuma Ikeda
2.	"Neko ni Naritai" (Music video)	bait
Total length:			0

Suki to Iwasetai – Wiz*One edition digital download
No.	Title	Music	Arrangement	Length
1.	"Suki to Iwasetai"	Chocolate Mix	Apazzi	4:01
2.	"Kenchanayo"	no_my	no_my	4:19
3.	"Dance o Omoidasumade"	Yurika Ohishi	Yurika Ohishi	4:34
Total length:				21:27

Suki to Iwasetai – Wiz*One edition physical edition
No.	Title	Music	Arrangement	Length
4.	"Suki to Iwasetai" (Instrumental)	Chocolate Mix	Apazzi	4:02
5.	"Kenchanayo" (Instrumental)	no_my	no_my	4:18
6.	"Dance o Omoidasumade" (Instrumental)	Yurika Ohishi	Yurika Ohishi	4:34

== Charts ==
Chart (2019)	Peak position
Japan (Japan Hot 100)	2
Japan (Oricon)	2

== Certifications ==
Region	Certification	Certified units/sales
Japan (RIAJ)	Platinum	250,000^{^}
^{^} Shipments figures based on certification alone.
