= Iz*One =

South Korean–Japanese girl group

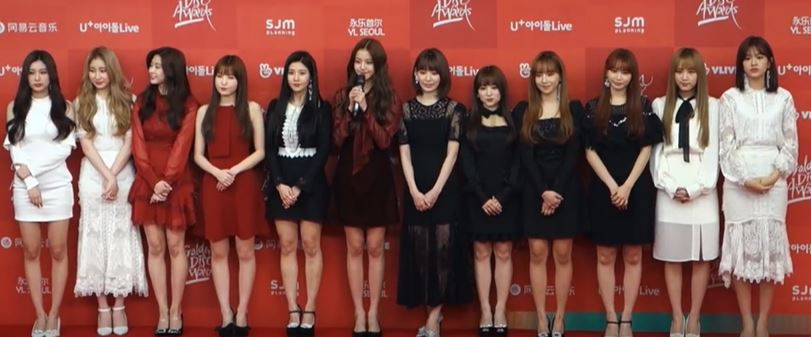
- Iz*One at the 33rd Golden Disc Awards in 2019; L–R: Hyewon, Chaeyeon, Minju, Hitomi, Eunbi, Wonyoung, Sakura, Nako, Yuri, Chaewon, Yena, and Yujin

Background information
- Origin: Seoul, South Korea
- Genres: K-pop; J-pop
- Years active: 2018–2021
- Labels: Off the Record; Swing; EMI; Vernalossom
- Past members: Kwon Eun-bi; Sakura Miyawaki; Kang Hye-won; Choi Ye-na; Lee Chae-yeon; Kim Chae-won; Kim Min-ju; Nako Yabuki; Hitomi Honda; Jo Yu-ri; An Yu-jin; Jang Won-young
- Website: iz-one.co.kr

Iz*One (/ˈaɪz wʌn/ EYEZ-wun; Korean: 아이즈원; RR: Aijeuwon; Japanese: アイズワン, romanized: Aizuwan; stylized in all caps) was a South Korean–Japanese girl group formed through the Mnet reality competition show Produce 48. The group was composed of twelve members: Jang Won-young, Sakura Miyawaki, Jo Yu-ri, Choi Ye-na, An Yu-jin, Nako Yabuki, Kwon Eun-bi, Kang Hye-won, Hitomi Honda, Kim Chae-won, Kim Min-ju, and Lee Chae-yeon. They were managed by Off the Record and Swing Entertainment.

Iz*One made their official debut on October 29, 2018, with their first extended play (EP) Color*Iz. The EP was commercially successful upon release, selling over 225,000 units and peaking at number two on the South Korean Gaon Album Chart. In addition, the EP and its lead single "La Vie en Rose" charted on Billboard World Albums and World Digital Songs, respectively. The early success subsequently earned them as the New Artist of the Year title at several awards ceremonies, including Golden Disc Awards and Seoul Music Awards.

The group's Japanese debut single, "Suki to Iwasetai", was released on February 6, 2019, under the Universal Music Group subsidiary EMI Records. Peaking at number two on Oricon Singles Chart and with over 250,000 unit sales, the single was certified platinum by the Recording Industry Association of Japan (RIAJ).

Iz*One released two studio albums (one Korean and one Japanese) and seven extended plays (four Korean and three Japanese). Despite initial talks of a possible contract extension, the group officially disbanded on April 29, 2021.

== Name ==
The group's name, Iz*One (stylized in all caps), was suggested by netizens through the official Produce 48 website and chosen by CJ ENM. "IZ" is a numeronym for the number 12, a homage to their twelve members, while "One" implies their unity as a group. The asterisk between "IZ" and "One" symbolizes the astrological signs of the zodiac.

== History ==
=== Formation through Produce 48 ===
Iz*One was formed through the reality competition show Produce 48, which aired on Mnet from June 15 to August 31, 2018. The show was billed as a collaboration between the Korean Produce 101 franchise and the Japanese idol AKB48 Group. Out of ninety-six initial contestants, the final twelve were announced via live television broadcast.

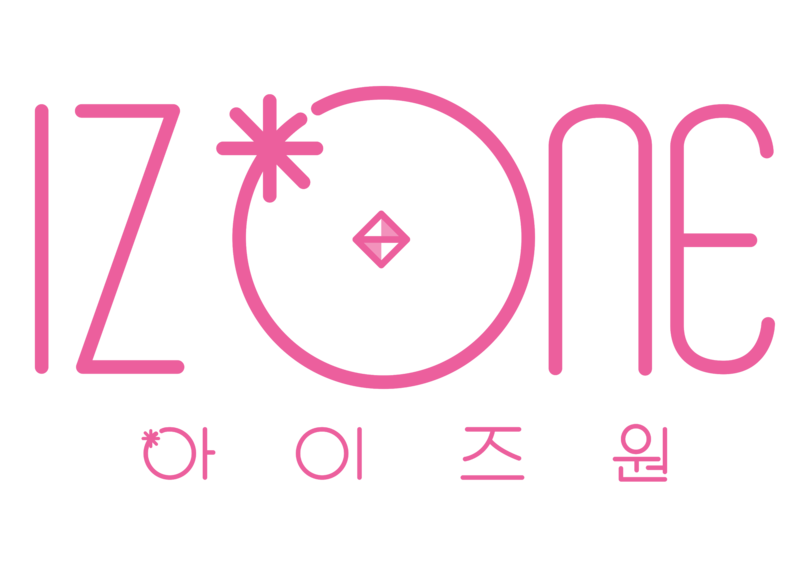
Iz*One's logo

Prior to appearing on the show, several members had been active in the entertainment industry. Hitomi Honda previously made her debut as a member of AKB48. Sakura Miyawaki appeared in a Shiki Theatre Company musical production of The Lion King (2008–2009) prior to joining HKT48, while Nako Yabuki played roles in the 2005 film Touch and various Japanese television dramas and commercials. Kwon Eun-bi previously debuted with Ye-A in 2014 under the stage name Kazoo, but later left the group. Kang Hye-won was a potential member for the groups DayDay and the Ark. Lee Chae-yeon previously competed in SBS' K-pop Star 3 and JYP Entertainment's reality competition show Sixteen. Jo Yu-ri was a contestant on the 2017 Mnet competition show Idol School, where she placed fifteenth. Kim Min-ju had appeared as an actress in music videos and Korean dramas, notably the 2018 MBC television series Tempted, in which she portrayed the young Choi Soo-ji (Moon Ga-young). An Yu-jin had also appeared as an actress in commercials and music videos, most notably in an Acuvue Vita commercial.

In September 2018, Off the Record announced that they would be taking over the management of Iz*One from Stone Music and Pledis Entertainment. All three Japanese members took hiatuses from their respective groups to promote with Iz*One.

=== 2018: Korean debut with Color*Iz ===
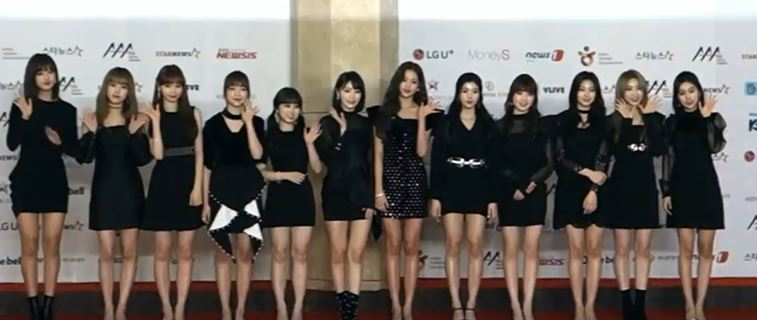
Iz*One at the 2018 Asia Artist Awards

The group's debut extended play (EP) Color*Iz was released on October 29, 2018, with "La Vie en Rose" as its lead single. A debut showcase concert, the Color*Iz Show-Con, was held in conjunction with the album's release at the Olympic Hall in Seoul, South Korea; tickets were sold out within one minute. Iz*One's first music program performance aired on November 1 on Mnet's M Countdown. They garnered their first music program win one week later on M Countdown, ten days after their official debut, breaking the record for the fastest girl group to receive a music program win at the time. The EP recorded sales over 34,000 units in its first day of release, setting a new record for the highest number of albums sold on the first day of a girl group's debut release; the music video for "La Vie en Rose" was viewed more than 4.5 million times in its first 24 hours on YouTube, making it the most-watched debut music video by a Korean act in 24 hours at the time. Color*Iz peaked at number two on the Gaon Album Chart and sold over 225,000 copies. It received a platinum certification from the Korea Music Content Association (KMCA) on July 9, 2020, 20 months after release, after surpassing 250,000 shipment figures. The group ended promotions for Color*Iz on November 23 on KBS's Music Bank. With the group's early commercial success, Iz*One won the New Artist of the Year category at several awards ceremonies, including the Mnet Asian Music Awards, Golden Disc Awards, and Seoul Music Awards. Their debut was considered by Billboard to be one of the best K-pop debuts of 2018. On December 5, Iz*One performed at the 2018 FNS Music Festival in Japan, the group's first overseas activity.

On December 6, Off the Record announced that Iz*One had signed a recording contract with Universal Music Japan's EMI Records label in preparation for their Japanese debut, which was revealed to be on February 6, 2019. On December 15, Sakura Miyawaki and Nako Yabuki returned to Japan for HKT48's eighth anniversary concert. Although the news received criticism initially, Off the Record responded that the two would participate in the concert as Iz*One members.

=== 2019: Japanese debut, subsequent releases and temporary hiatus ===
Iz*One held their Japanese debut showcase at Tokyo Dome City Hall on January 20, where they performed their debut Japanese single "Suki to Iwasetai" for the first time. The music video for the single was released on January 25, five days after the event, while the single itself was released on February 6. It peaked at number two on both the Oricon Singles Chart and Billboard Japan Hot 100, selling over 200,000 copies in its first week. On March 8, it was certified platinum by the Recording Industry Association of Japan (RIAJ) with over 250,000 unit sales, the group's first platinum certification.

On March 9, English DJ and producer Jonas Blue released a new version of his 2018 hit single "Rise", featuring Iz*One's vocals.

The group released their second EP, Heart*Iz, on April 1. Domestic pre-orders for the EP exceeded 200,000 copies. Upon release, it topped in both the Gaon Album and Oricon Overseas Album Charts and sold more than 130,000 copies in its first week, a new record for a K-pop girl group at the time. The EP was certified platinum on October 10 by the KMCA; it peaked at number six on Billboard World Albums chart. Meanwhile, the lead single "Violeta" peaked at numbers 18 and five on Gaon Digital Chart and Billboard K-pop Hot 100, respectively. It also charted at number eight on the Billboard World Digital Songs chart. The song received its first music program win on SBS MTV's The Show on April 9.

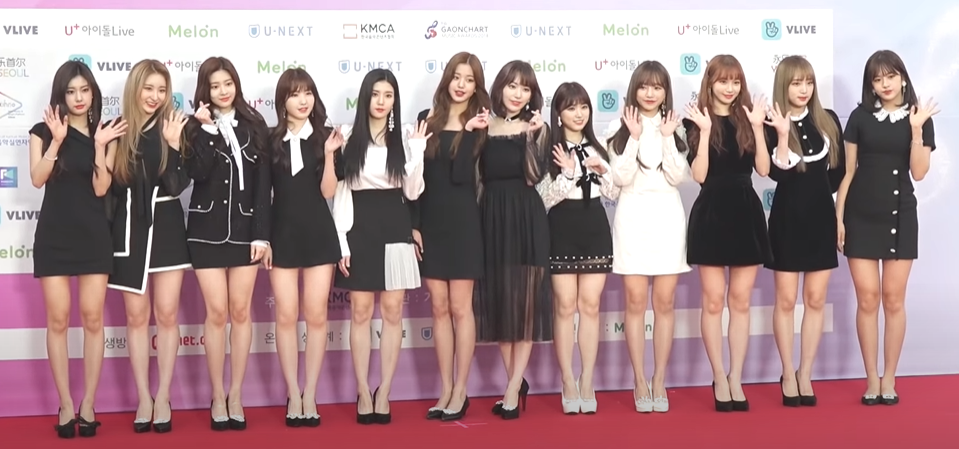
IZ*ONE in 2019

Iz*One embarked on their first headlining tour, Eyes on Me, at the Jamsil Indoor Stadium in Seoul, South Korea. After tickets for the first two initial dates (June 8 and 9) sold out, Off the Record added an additional concert show on June 7. During the tour, they performed two new songs, "Ayayaya" and "So Curious", in sub-units. The group visited eight cities in five territories, with a total attendance of 81,000 people. On July 6, the group participated in the annual music festival KCON, held at the Madison Square Garden in New York City, their first U.S. performance.

The group released their second Japanese single, "Buenos Aires", on June 26. It debuted atop on both the Oricon Singles Chart and Billboard Japan Hot 100, receiving a platinum certification from the RIAJ in July 2019. On September 25, Iz*One released their third Japanese single, titled "Vampire". Like the previous release, it topped both domestic charts in Japan with first week sales exceeding 200,000 copies, leading to a gold certification from the RIAJ. "Vampire" was also the group's only Japanese release to chart on Billboard K-pop Hot 100, peaking at number 52. Following their commercial success, the group became Oricon's best-selling new artist for the first half of 2019, accounting for an estimated ¥510 million (₩5.5 billion) of total sales in Japan between December 10, 2018, and June 9, 2019. Iz*One participated in the 2019 Tokyo Girls Collection events in three cities, the first guest performer to do so.

The group was scheduled to release their first studio album on November 11. However, the release was postponed due to the Mnet vote manipulation investigation. Investigations revealed that the Produce 48 producer Ahn Joon-young had selected the twelve members of Iz*One from the top 20 just before the airing of the finale. As a result, Iz*One's showcases, promotions, and several guest appearances were cancelled or put on hold, which included the release of their concert film, Eyes on Me: The Movie, and their Japanese promotions.

=== 2020–2021: Bloom*Iz, Oneiric Diary, Twelve, One-reeler / Act IV, final concert and disbandment ===
On January 6, 2020, the Iz*One members' agencies and CJ ENM reached an agreement that the group would resume promotional activities. On February 17, the group released their first studio album Bloom*Iz alongside lead single "Fiesta". On February 23, the album broke the then-record for the highest first-week sales on Hanteo for an album by a girl group, selling 356,313 copies; it also became the first album by a girl group to surpass the 300,000 copies mark in Hanteo history. Bloom*Iz was certified platinum by the KMCA on April 9, selling over 390,000 units in shipments. Bloom*Iz also topped Oricon Overseas Album Chart.

On June 15, Iz*One released their third EP, Oneiric Diary, and its lead single "Secret Story of the Swan". The single's music video was originally scheduled to be released on the same day as the EP but was postponed to June 16. The group held a comeback showcase to promote the EP on Mnet's second channel M2. Oneiric Diary peaked at number two on the Gaon Album Chart and has recorded over 510,000 sales. It was one of the first two albums by a girl group to be certified double platinum by the KMCA (the other the one being Twice's More & More). On September 13, Iz*One held their first online concert, titled Oneiric Theater. On October 21, they released their first Japanese studio album, Twelve. The album debuted atop the Oricon Albums Chart. On December 7, Iz*One released their fourth EP, One-reeler / Act IV, accompanied by its lead single "Panorama". The EP debuted at number one on the Gaon Album Chart.

On January 26, 2021, Iz*One released a promotional single titled "D-D-Dance" for the mobile application Universe. On February 11, the group announced that they would hold their final online concert—One, the Story—on March 13 and 14, ahead of their contract expiration in April. The announcement on its extension was not yet announced. On February 15, 2021, five Iz*One members (Kwon Eun-bi, Sakura Miyawaki, Kim Min-ju, Jo Yu-ri and Jang Won-young) participated in the release of a promotional single, "Zero:Attitude", with singer Soyou (who previously trained the group in Produce 48) and rapper pH-1. The song was released in collaboration with Pepsi and Starship Entertainment as a part of their Pepsi X Starship campaign. Iz*One participated in the compilation album Rewind : Blossom and remade Roo'ra's popular song 3!4!.

Iz*One's official fanbase, Wiz*One, began an initiative called Parallel Universe on April 21, 2021, in an attempt to prevent the group's upcoming disbandment. The name "Parallel Universe" was chosen to pay homage to a song of the same name that was released during the One, the Story concert. The initiative raised ₩1,000,000,000 (roughly US$900,000), its funding goal; however, Iz*One disbanded as planned on April 29, 2021.

On June 19, 2021, CJ ENM confirmed that discussion with the Iz*One members' agencies was underway to potentially relaunch the group. Negotiations ultimately fell through in July, and the group's reunion was cancelled.

== Endorsements ==
Prior to their debut, Iz*One endorsed and collaborated with brands such as Overhit, Salewa, and Skoolooks. As an active group, Iz*One endorsed and collaborated with G-Market, Fever Basket, Olive Young's Colorgram:TOK, Sudden Attack, Miche Bloomin', and PepsiCo. The group also featured in numerous magazines, including Non-no and Elle.

== Members ==
Korean members are listed in Eastern name order. Japanese members are listed in Western name order with both Japanese and Korean transliterations in parentheses.

- Kwon Eun-bi (권은비) – leader (Note: In the second episode of Iz*One Chu, Kwon Eun-bi was selected to be the leader of the group.)
- Sakura Miyawaki (宮脇咲良; 미야와키 사쿠라)
- Kang Hye-won (강혜원)
- Choi Ye-na (최예나)
- Lee Chae-yeon (이채연)
- Kim Chae-won (김채원)
- Kim Min-ju (김민주)
- Nako Yabuki (矢吹奈子; 야부키 나코)
- Hitomi Honda (本田仁美; 혼다 히토미)
- Jo Yu-ri (조유리)
- An Yu-jin (안유진)
- Jang Won-young (장원영)

== Discography ==
Korean albums

- Bloom*Iz (2020)

Japanese albums

- Twelve (2020)

== Filmography ==
=== Film ===
Year	Title	Role	Notes	Ref.
2020	Eyes on Me: The Movie	Themselves	Concert film	

=== Reality shows ===
Year	Title	Notes	Ref.
2018	Iz*One Chu	Debut reality show	
2019	Iz*One's First Steps in Japan	Pre-debut guide to Japanese variety shows	
2019	Iz*One City		
2019	Iz*One Chu – Secret Friend		
2020	Iz*One Chu – Fantasy Campus		
2020	Iz*One Eat-ing Trip		
2020	Iz*One Chu – ON:TACT		
2021	Iz*One Eat-ing Trip 2		
2021	Fantastic I*z: Hidden School		
2021	Iz*One Eat-ing Trip 3		

== Concerts ==
=== Concert tour ===
- Iz*One 1st Concert "Eyes on Me" (2019)

=== One-off concerts ===
- Color*Iz Show-Con Showcase (2018)
- Iz*One Japan Debut Showcase 1st Single "Suki to Iwasetai" Release Commemoration Event (2019)

=== Online concerts ===
- Iz*One 1st Online Concert "Oneiric Theater" (2020)
- Iz*One 2nd Online Concert "One, the Story" (2021)
