= Sakura Miyawaki =

Japanese singer and actress (born 1998)

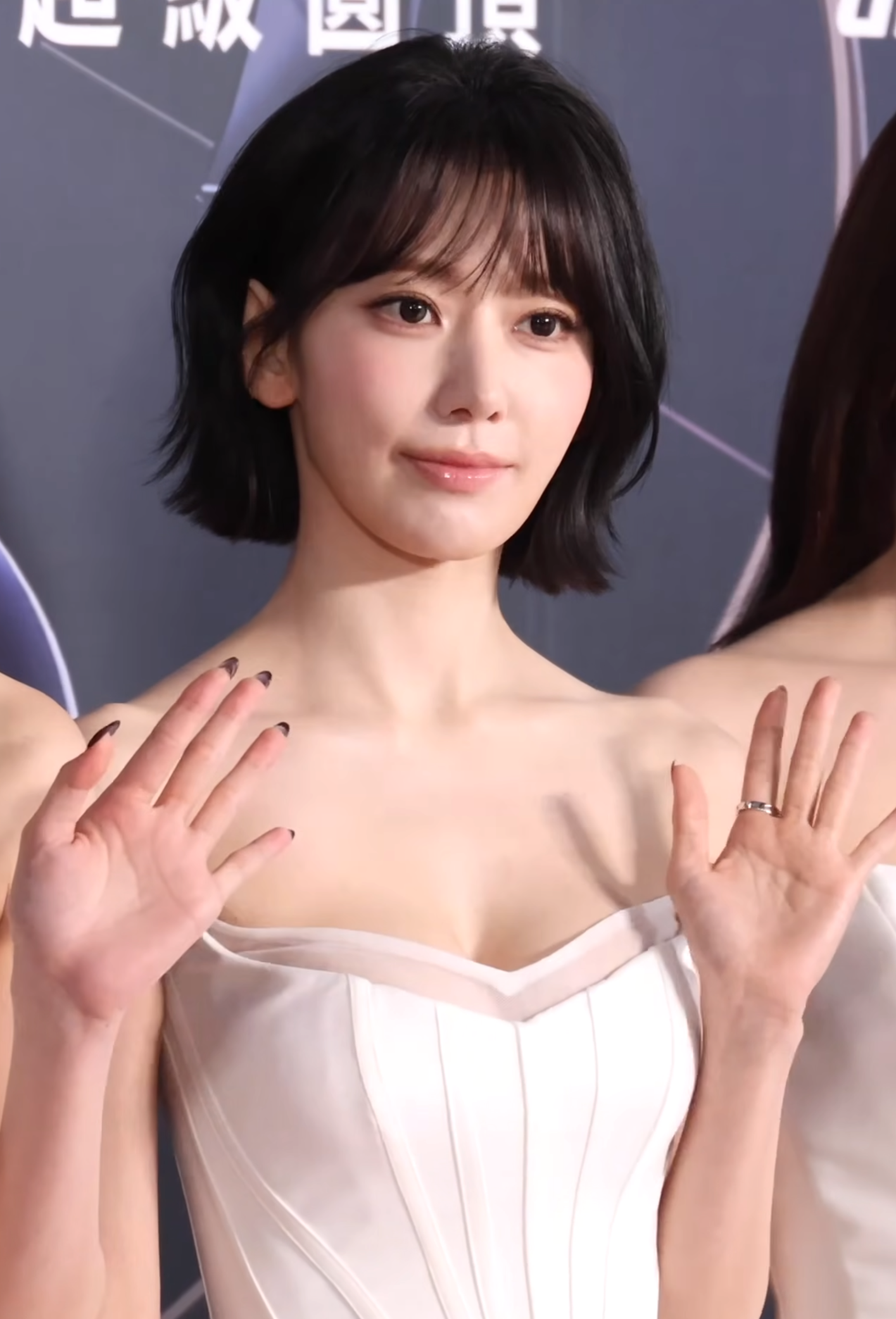
- Miyawaki in 2026
- Born: March 19, 1998 (age 28); Kagoshima, Japan
- Education: Maria Musical Academy
- Occupations: Singer; actress
- Years active: 2011–present
- Agent: A.M.
- Musical career
- Genres: J-pop; K-pop
- Instrument: Vocals
- Labels: AKS; Off The Record (Note: As a member of Iz*One only.); EMI (Note: As a member of Iz*One (2018–2021) and Le Sserafim (since 2023) only.); Source; Geffen (Note: As a member of Le Sserafim only.)
- Member of: Le Sserafim
- Formerly of: HKT48; AKB48; Iz*One

Japanese name
- Kanji: 宮脇 咲良
- Hiragana: みやわき さくら
- Romanization: Miyawaki Sakura

Sakura Miyawaki (宮脇咲良, Miyawaki Sakura; born March 19, 1998), also known mononymously as Sakura, is a Japanese singer and actress based in South Korea. She is a member of the South Korean girl group Le Sserafim, and a former member of South Korean–Japanese girl group Iz*One and Japanese girl groups AKB48 and its sister group HKT48.

Miyawaki began her music career with the girl group HKT48 in 2011 and was a concurrent member of their sister group AKB48 from 2014 to 2018. During her tenure, she held center positions for the singles "Kimi wa Melody" and "No Way Man". Miyawaki took a hiatus from HKT48 in 2018 after placing second in the reality competition show Produce 48, joining the girl group Iz*One until 2021, then leaving HKT48 a few months later to pursue her idol career in South Korea by joining Le Sserafim, which debuted in May 2022.

== Life and career ==
=== Early life ===
Sakura Miyawaki was born on March 19, 1998, in Kagoshima City, Kagoshima Prefecture, Japan, where she was raised. Her parents divorced when she was a year old. She has a younger half-brother, twelve years her junior, from her mother's second marriage. Influenced by her mother, she began attending a local musical school at a young age, and at the age of 10, she appeared as Young Nala in the Shiki Theatre Company's musical The Lion King. In 2010, she participated in "The Broadway Experience" in New York, where she received intensive dance, singing, and acting lessons from Broadway musical actors and choreographers for a week. She later graduated from the Maria Musical Academy in her hometown of Kagoshima.

=== 2011–2017: Career beginnings ===
Miyawaki joined HKT48 as a first-generation trainee in July 2011. She made her first official appearance as an HKT48 member on October 23 at a national handshake event for the song "Flying Get". She made her theater debut on November 26 with a revival of SKE48 Team S stage "Te wo Tsunaginagara".

Miyawaki was officially promoted to full member status of HKT48 Team H on March 4, 2012, along with 15 other trainees. That year, Miyawaki became the first HKT48 member to have ranked in the AKB48 general election. She received 6,635 votes, placing her at the 47th position. In October, she landed her first A-side participation on AKB48's 28th single "Uza". Although she did not make the A-side for the 29th and 30th singles, she appeared on the A-side for the 31st single, "Sayonara Crawl", released on May 22, 2013, and placed 26th overall in AKB48's 2013 general election with 25,760 votes. In the same year, Miyawaki made her first A-side participation with HKT48 on their first single "Suki! Suki! Skip!" (Like! Like! Skip!) and Melon Juice.

On January 11, 2014, it was announced during the first day of HKT48's Kyushu 7 Prefecture Tour at Oita, that Miyawaki would be transferred to the newly formed Team KIV. Later, at AKB48's Group Grand Reformation Festival, she was promoted to vice captain of Team KIV and given a concurrent position in AKB48 Team A.

Miyawaki participated in the 2014 AKB48 general election and placed 11th overall with 45,538 votes, landing her a position on the A-side for "Kokoro no Placard". In that year's rock-paper-scissors tournament, Miyawaki lost in the 3rd round of the preliminary competition. However, management decided she would share the lead position with winner Mayu Watanabe for AKB48's 38th single, "Kiboteki Refrain", and became the first local HKT48 member to have lead position on an A-side single.

In 2015, Miyawaki was given a lead role in AKB48's drama Majisuka Gakuen 4 along with Haruka Shimazaki. The season premiered on January 19. She placed 7th overall in the general election the same year with 81,422 votes. In July, she released her first photobook, Sakura, which peaked at number 1 on the weekly Oricon photobook chart and number 3 on the general book chart. She achieved her first solo lead position on AKB's 43rd single with "Kimi wa Melody", released on March 9, 2016.

=== 2018–2021: Produce 48, Iz*One, graduation from HKT48 ===
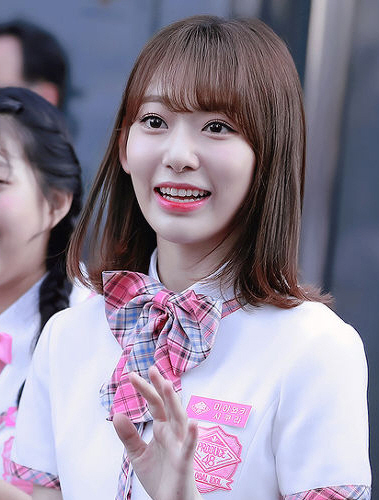
Miyawaki in 2018, as a contestant on Produce 48

In 2018, Miyawaki participated and placed second in reality girl group survival show Produce 48, and became a member of Korean-Japanese idol group Iz*One that debuted in October of the same year. She knew very little Korean upon joining the group, but improved her skills with the help of Lee Chae-yeon and other Korean members of the group who could speak Japanese. Miyawaki and the other two Japanese members of the group took a hiatus from their respective Japanese groups until their contracts with Iz*One expired in April 2021. She also launched her own video gaming channel on YouTube in 2018, which had over 717,000 subscribers and 25 million video views by March 16, 2025.

After Iz*One's disbandment, a preview of Miyawaki's interview with the July issue of Vivi leaked that she was leaving HKT48. On May 15, 2021, Miyawaki confirmed her departure, with a graduation concert scheduled to be held on June 19. At the concert, held in Fukuoka, Miyawaki was joined by other former AKB48 and HKT48 members including Nako Yabuki, Rino Sashihara, and Haruka Kodama to perform their groups' songs; she also sang several of her solo songs including "Yume de Kiss Me". A short version for the music video of her graduation song, "Omoide ni Suru ni wa Mada Hayasugiru" (思い出にするにはまだ早すぎる; lit. "It's Too Early to Turn it Into a Memory Yet"), was uploaded to YouTube on June 14, while the official audio was released on June 20. Her final performance with HKT48 was on June 27. On November 1, 2021, Vernalossom announced that Miyawaki's contract with them had concluded.

=== 2022–present: Debut with Le Sserafim ===
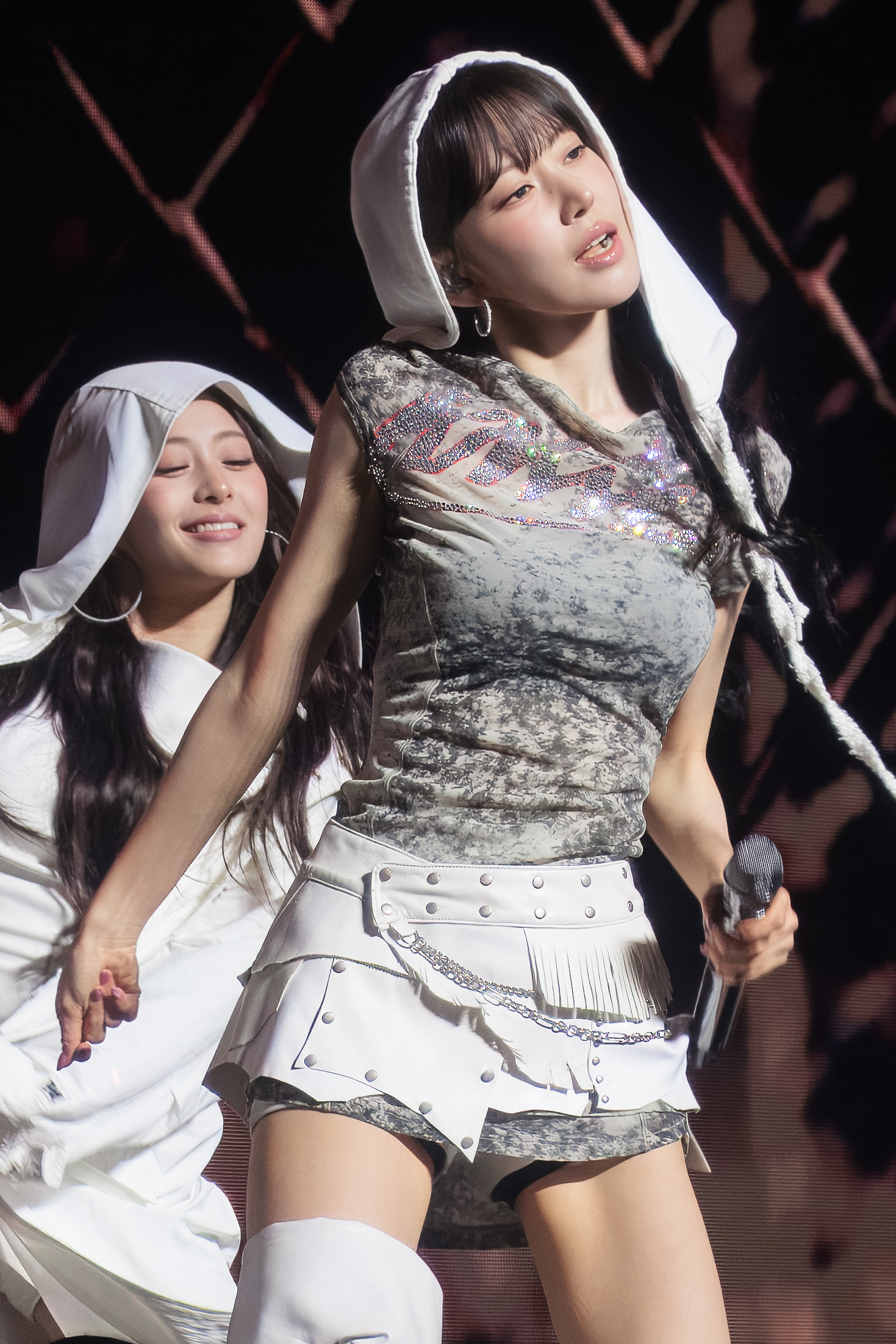
Miyawaki performing with Le Sserafim in 2025

On March 14, 2022, Miyawaki, alongside former Iz*One member Kim Chaewon and former Produce 48 contestant Huh Yunjin, signed exclusive contracts with Source Music, and were confirmed to debut as members of Le Sserafim in May. On March 21, 2022, she joined Japanese talent agency A.M. Entertainment for individual activities in Japan. On May 2, 2022, Le Sserafim made their debut with the extended play, Fearless.

In April 2024, Le Sserafim performed at the Coachella Valley Music and Arts Festival. The performance drew criticism of the members' live vocals, and Miyawaki responded in a post on the fan platform Weverse, writing that the group had learned a great deal while preparing and had given performance their full effort. In April 2025, Le Sserafim began their first world tour, Easy Crazy Hot, at Inspire Arena in Incheon, where reviewers noted that the members' vocals had noticeably improved since Coachella.

In 2026, Miyawaki was included on the Forbes Japan 30 Under 30 list.

== Other ventures ==
=== Endorsements ===
On November 14, 2015, Miyawaki was chosen as the model for the "Kagoshima Roman Theater" campaign, aimed at promoting tourism and showcasing various attractions in Kagoshima. In September 2016, Miyawaki collaborated with Erika Kenko Dojo to promote the champagne drink "Yukousen," alongside four of her HKT48 bandmates. In October 2016, a new campaign starring Miyawaki was announced to promote World Heritage Sites in Kagoshima City, including the Shōko Shūseikan.

In 2019, Miyawaki was selected as the main model for the Japanese color contact lens brand Molak. In May 2021, Miyawaki was selected as the Asian brand ambassador for the Chinese cosmetics brand Flower Knows, and the face of the hair care brand Kérastase Japan, representing its "Blond Absolu" line. In 2022, she was selected as the main model for the Japanese clothing brand Lily Brown, collaborating on its seasonal collections. In 2023, South Korean skincare brand Primera appointed her as its global ambassador. In January 2026, Miyawaki was appointed the first K-pop global ambassador for the Japanese lifestyle company Felissimo, launching a collaborative yarn craft line under the "SAKURA MIYAWAKI × Couturier" brand. The partnership involved in-depth product planning and a television appearance on NHK to showcase the crochet kits. In June 2026, Miyawaki was selected as the brand ambassador for Maybelline New York's new line of mascara products.

=== Business ===
Miyawaki launched her cosmetic brand Cran by Molak in 2021, as a partnership with the brand Molak, which she modeled for. The brand ceased operations on November 30, 2022. In January 2025, she launched a personalized knitting and crochet brand called "Kkurochet", and participated in the design and planning of the project.

== AKB48 General Election placements ==
Miyawaki's placements in AKB48's annual general elections:

Edition	Year	Final rank	Number of votes	Position on single	Single	Ref.
4	2012	47	6,635	Next Girls	Doremifa Onchi	
5	2013	26	25,760	Undergirls	Ai no Imi o Kangaete Mita	
6	2014	11	45,538	Senbatsu	Kokoro no Placard	
7	2015	7	81,422	Senbatsu	Halloween Night	
8	2016	6	78,279	Senbatsu	Love Trip / Shiawase o Wakenasai	
9	2017	4	82,803	Senbatsu	#Sukinanda	
10	2018	3	141,106	Senbatsu	Sentimental Train	

== Discography ==
=== Composition credits ===
All song credits are adapted from the Korea Music Copyright Association's database, unless otherwise noted.

Title	Year	Artist	Album	Lyrics	Music
"Love Bubble"	2019	Iz*One	Vampire	Yes	No
"With*One"	2020	Iz*One	Oneiric Diary	Yes	No
"Secret Story of the Swan" (Japanese version)	2020	Iz*One	Oneiric Diary	Yes	No
"Yummy Summer"	2020	Iz*One	Twelve	Yes	Yes
"Fiesta" (Japanese version)	2020	Iz*One	Twelve	Yes	No
"Zuttomo Project"	2021	=Love	Weekend Citron	Yes	No
"Good Parts (when the quality is bad but I am)"	2022	Le Sserafim	Antifragile	Yes	Yes
"피어나 (Between you, me and the lamppost)"	2023	Le Sserafim	Unforgiven	Yes	No
"Swan Song"	2024	Le Sserafim	Easy	Yes	Yes
"Crazy"	2024	Le Sserafim	Crazy	Yes	Yes
"Spaghetti"	2025	Le Sserafim	Spaghetti	Yes	Yes
"Liminal Space"	2026	Le Sserafim	Pureflow Pt. 1	Yes	No

== Filmography ==
=== Film ===
Year	Title	Role	Notes	Ref.
2016	Documentary of HKT48: The Night Theatre Manager Ozaki Cried	Herself	Documentary film	
2016	Raison D'etre: Documentary of AKB48	Herself	Documentary film	
2019	Diner	Waitress	Cameo	

=== Television series ===
Year	Title	Role	Notes	Ref.
2012	Ano Hito no Ano Hi	Nazuna Imagawa	Television film	
2013	Himitsu	Mari	Television film	
2015	Majisuka Gakuen 4	Herself		
2015	Majisuka Gakuen 5	Herself		
2015	AKB Horror Night: Adrenaline's Night	Juri	Episode 5: "Doppelgänger"	
2015	Majisuka Gakuen 0	Herself	Television film	
2016	Crow's Blood	Maki Togawa		
2016	AKB Love Night: Love Factory	Herself		
2016	The Hero Yoshihiko and the Seven Chosen Ones	School idol group member	Cameo (Episode 9)	
2016–2017	Cabasuka Gakuen	Herself		
2017	Tofu Pro-Wrestling	Herself / Cherry Miyawaki		

=== Web series ===
Year	Title	Role	Notes	Ref.
2016	AKB48 General Elections Special: The Akiba Papers	Herself		
2016	Doctor-Y: Surgeon Hideki Kaji	Haruka Mifune		
2018	Shanghai Love Map	Herself	Cameo	

=== Web shows ===
Year	Title	Role	Ref.
2022–present	Fearless Kkura	Host	

=== Television shows ===
Year	Title	Role	Notes	Ref.
2018	Produce 48	Contestant	Finished 2nd	
2018	Everyone's Kitchen	Cast member	Pilot broadcast	
2019	Everyone's Kitchen	Cast member		
2025	Knowing International High School	Cast member		

=== Radio show ===
Year	Title	Network	Role	Ref.
2017–2021	Tonight Under the Sakura Tree	Bay FM	Host	

== Bibliography ==
=== Solo photobooks ===
Title	Release date	Charts		Publisher
Title	Release date	JP		Publisher
Title	Release date	Oricon PB	Oricon Books	Publisher
Sakura Miyawaki First Photobook "Sakura" (宮脇咲良ファースト写真集「さくら」)	July 2015	1	3	Shueisha
Sakura Miyawaki Graduation Visual Booklet (宮脇咲良 卒業ビジュアルブックレット)	May 2021	—N/a		Mercury; Media Pal
