= Panorama (Iz*One song) =

2020 single by Iz*One

Single by Iz*One

from the EP One-reeler / Act IV
- Language: Korean
- Released: December 7, 2020
- Recorded: 2020
- Genre: Electropop; house
- Length: 3:42
- Label: Off The Record; Swing
- Composers: KZ; Nthonius; B.O.; FAB; Jayins; Ji Ye-joon
- Lyricists: KZ; B.O.; FAB

Iz*One singles chronology
"Beware" (2020)	"Panorama" (2020)

Music video
- "Panorama" on YouTube

"Panorama" is a song recorded by the South Korean-Japanese girl group Iz*One. It was released on December 7, 2020, as the first single from their fourth mini-album One-reeler / Act IV. "Panorama" is an electropop and house song that bounds forward on a propulsive dance beat, melded with aggressive synths and sprightly bass. This was the last single released by Iz*One before their disbandment in April 2021.

== Background ==
The first teaser for the song was released on December 2, 2020, with the highlight medley being released on the next day. The second music video teaser was released on December 4, 2020. The 30-second clip shows individual shots of the members from the music video while the instrumental version of the song was being played in the background.

== Lyrics and composition ==
"Panorama" is an electropop and house track composed and written by KZ, B.O., and FAB. Nthonius, Jayins, and Ji Ye Joon also took part in writing the lyrics, which are about treasuring the radiant memories in life. The song is composed in A minor and has a tempo of 126 beats per minute. The song is arranged in a way that evokes the image of a beautiful landscape, and the emotional melody line highlights groups desire to remember their shining moments together forever. The beat of the song is multifaceted and the song features an underlying bass, electronic sounds, synths and clapping beats. The intensity and tempo of the song increase leading to the chorus which has been described as both explosive and powerful.

== Live performance ==
The song was performed for the first time during the group's live premiere for the album alongside another song from the album titled "Sequence". The group also performed the song at the 2020 Mnet Asian Music Awards on December 6.

== Charts ==
=== Weekly charts ===
Weekly chart performance for "Panorama"
Chart (2020)	Peak position
Japan (Japan Hot 100)	33
South Korea (Gaon)	22
South Korea (K-pop Hot 100)	23
US World Digital Songs (Billboard)	22

=== Year-end charts ===
Year-end chart performance for "Panorama"
Chart (2021)	Position
South Korea (Gaon)	117

== Accolades ==
Iz*One took their first win for the song on December 15, on The Show winning against Momoland's "Ready Or Not" and Enhypen's "Given Taken". Winning a total of five awards the song became the group's second most award song only behind "Violeta" and "Secret Story of the Swan" both of which had seven wins each.

=== Music program wins ===
Program	Date	Ref.
The Show (SBS MTV)	December 15, 2020	
M Countdown (Mnet)	December 17, 2020	
M Countdown (Mnet)	December 24, 2020	
Music Bank (KBS)	December 18, 2020	
Inkigayo (SBS)	December 20, 2020	

== Release history ==
Region	Date	Format	Label
Various	December 7, 2020	Digital download; streaming	Off The Record; Swing

== See also ==
- List of Inkigayo Chart winners (2020)
- List of M Countdown Chart winners (2020)
- List of Music Bank Chart winners (2020)
