= La Vie en Rose (Iz*One song) =

2018 debut single by Iz*One

Single by Iz*One

from the album Color*Iz
- Language: Korean
- Released: October 29, 2018
- Genre: Electropop
- Length: 3:39
- Label: Off the Record; Stone Music
- Songwriter: MosPick
- Producer: MosPick

Iz*One singles chronology
"La Vie en Rose" (2018)	"Suki to Iwasetai" (2019)

Music video
- "La Vie en Rose" on YouTube

"La Vie en Rose" (Korean: 라비앙로즈) is the debut single by South Korean–Japanese girl group Iz*One, released on October 29, 2018, by Off the Record Entertainment as the lead single from their debut extended play (EP) Color*Iz. It was written, composed and produced by the MosPick Music Producing Group from Cube Entertainment.

== Composition ==
"La Vie en Rose"
Pre-chorus up to the Chorus part of "La Vie en Rose", a vibrant, groovy electro-pop track.

"La Vie en Rose", which is composed in the key of F major with a tempo of 116 bpm, is described as a vibrant, groovy electropop track. Captivating from the get-go, "La Vie en Rose" blends a wide range of elements – ambient synths, stomping beats, tinny snare and echoing strings drive much of the track – in its attempt at achieving midtempo pop perfection. The melody soars with the members' vocals, exploding with a pre-chorus build and sudden drop to the more restrained titular hook, serving up an introductory track that is all at once powerful and delicate. The song was composed and produced by the MosPick Music Producing Group from Cube Entertainment, which is known for producing successful releases such as 4Minute's "Crazy" and HyunA's "Lip & Hip".

The song was initially composed and recorded for the girl group CLC, who had planned it as a follow-up to their 2018 track "Black Dress." However, the song was reassigned to Iz*One for their debut by Cube Entertainment's internal decision-making, even though CLC members had already completed recording. CLC member Jang Yeeun later acknowledged the industry's flexibility with song assignments, expressing support and noting that the track found a "better fit" with Iz*One.

== Music video ==
On October 29, "La Vie en Rose" was released along with its music video through various sites and music portals, including YouTube, Melon and Naver TV. Directed by VM Project Architecture, the music video is inspired by the color red, with the twelve members seen singing and dancing in red-and-leather outfits, and "counters the more impactful outfits with softer feminine ones".

The music video achieved more than 4.5 million views in the first 24 hours of its release on YouTube, surpassing the previous record held by Stray Kids for most views of a K-pop group's debut music video within 24 hours. It exceeded more than 10 million views within four days of its release.

== Commercial performance ==
"La Vie en Rose" debuted at number 6 on the Billboard World Digital Song Sales chart, selling 1,000 downloads in the week ending November 1, 2018, according to Nielsen Music, and was the week's third-biggest-selling K-pop song.

== Charts ==
Chart (2018)	Peak position
Japan (Japan Hot 100)	22
Malaysia (RIM)	19
Singapore (RIAS)	9
South Korea (Gaon)	14
South Korea (Kpop Hot 100)	11
US World Digital Songs (Billboard)	6

== Accolades ==
Decade-end lists
Publication	Accolade	Rank	Ref.
Paper	Paper's Top 20 K-Pop Songs of 2018	8	
BuzzFeed	30 Songs That Helped Define K-Pop In 2018	19	
Billboard	The 100 Greatest K-Pop Songs of the 2010s	62	
Billboard	The 20 Best K-pop Songs of 2018: Critics' Picks	9	

=== Music program wins ===
Program	Date	Ref.
M Countdown (Mnet)	November 8, 2018	
The Show (SBS MTV)	November 13, 2018	
The Show (SBS MTV)	November 20, 2018	

== Certifications ==
Certifications for "La Vie en Rose"
Region	Certification	Certified units/sales
Streaming
Japan (RIAJ)	Gold	50,000,000^{†}
^{†} Streaming-only figures based on certification alone.

== See also ==
- List of M Countdown Chart winners (2018)
