= Violeta (Iz*One song) =

2019 single by Iz*One

Single by Iz*One

from the album Heart*Iz
- Language: Korean
- Released: April 1, 2019
- Genre: Pop; tropical house; future bass
- Length: 3:20
- Label: Off the Record; Stone
- Songwriters: Choi Hyun-joon; Kim Seung-soo
- Producers: Choi Hyun-joon; Kim Seung-soo

Iz*One singles chronology
"Rise" (2019)	"Violeta" (2019)	"Buenos Aires" (2019)

Music video
- "Violeta" on YouTube

"Violeta" (Korean: 비올레타) is a song recorded by South Korean–Japanese girl group Iz*One, released on April 1, 2019 by Off the Record Entertainment as the lead single from their second extended play (EP) Heart*Iz.

== Composition ==
"Violeta" is a pop track with tropical house beats and a future bass intro, inspired by the story "The Happy Prince" lyrically. It is described by Jeff Benjamin of Billboard as having "a color and floral theme as the ladies try to conjure and coax a lover into opening up to them like a flower on the verge of blooming". It offers a more uptempo and choreography-focused than the previous Korean song "La Vie en Rose". Jack Wannan of LWOS Life praised the song as "[an] amazing production".

== Commercial performance ==
In South Korea the song peaked at number 18. On the K-Pop Hot 100 the song peaked at number five making it the group's highest charting song on the chart. On the US World chart the song peaked at number 8 becoming their second top 10 hit. Despite being a Korean single the song was successful in Japan too peaking at number 13 on the Billboard Japan Hot 100.

== Music video ==
The music video for "Violeta" was released on April 1, 2019. Directed by Digipedi, the video gives a "vibrant and nature-themed imagery [...] featuring meadow flowers, glowing prisms, splashing water and more aesthetically pleasing designs".

As at March 22, 2021, the music video achieves more than 70 million views. Off the Record released a special video in commemoration of achieving 40 million views.

== Personnel ==
Credits adapted from the liner notes of Heart*Iz.

- Iz*One – primary vocals
- Choi Hyun-joon – composer, lyrics, vocal direction
- Kim Seung-soo – composer, lyrics
- Park Seul-gi – arrangement, computer programming, instrument
- Kim So-ri – chorus
- Kim Min-hee – recording engineer
- Choi Hyun-jun – vocal editing
- Mr. Cho – mixing engineer
- Kwon Nam-woo – mastering engineer

== Charts ==
Chart (2019)	Peak position
Japan (Japan Hot 100)	13
South Korea (Gaon)	18
South Korea (K-pop Hot 100)	5
US World Digital Songs (Billboard)	8

== Accolades ==
=== Music program wins ===
Program	Date	Ref.
M Countdown (Mnet)	April 11, 2019	
M Countdown (Mnet)	April 18, 2019	
The Show (SBS M)	April 9, 2019	
The Show (SBS M)	April 16, 2019	
Show Champion (MBC M)	April 10, 2019	
Show Champion (MBC M)	April 17, 2019	
Music Bank (KBS)	April 12, 2019	

== See also ==
- List of M Countdown Chart winners (2019)
