= Fiesta (Iz*One song) =

2020 single by Iz*One

Single by Iz*One

from the album Bloom*Iz
- Language: Korean
- Released: February 17, 2020
- Recorded: 2019–2020
- Genre: Synth-pop, EDM
- Length: 3:37
- Label: Off The Record; Stone Music
- Songwriters: Seo Ji-eum; Go Hyun-jung (JamFactory); Choi Hyun-joon; Kim Seung-so

Iz*One singles chronology
"Vampire" (2019)	"Fiesta" (2020)	"Secret Story of the Swan" (2020)

Music video
- "Fiesta" on YouTube

"Fiesta" is a song recorded by South Korean–Japanese girl group Iz*One. It was released on February 17, 2020, serving as the title track for their first studio album Bloom*Iz.

== Composition ==
Billboard described the song as a "festive synth pop song which takes its name to heart with the sliding, synth pop throbber of a track that explodes into a brass led dance breakdown".

== Background and release ==
On October 29, 2019, Iz*One released a concept trailer titled When IZ your BLOOMing moment?, signaling their return for a new comeback. On November 3, the track listing for their album was revealed, revealing the lead single to be "Fiesta" along with 11 other tracks in the album. On November 7, Off the Record released an official statement in a press release, that they would cancel their showcase, which was set on November 11. It was also announced by MNET that the broadcast would be canceled due to controversy over the Produce 48 rankings being manipulated. On January 23, 2020, another official statement was released by MNET, announcing that Iz*One would be resuming activities in February. On February 3, a teaser photo was released, revealing the official date for their "Fiesta" release. It was set for February 17. On February 12, a vivid teaser was released for their "Fiesta" music video.

== Promotion ==
Iz*One made their comeback stage premiere on February 17, 2020, on their MNET comeback show that was previously canceled. They performed an opening with "Spaceship" where they performed other tracks from their album. On February 22, Iz*One released an official statement on their fancafe, concerning Eunbi. It announced that member Kwon Eun-bi would be halting from promotional activities after the doctor recommended she rest. The group earned their first win for February 25, on The Show.

== Music video ==
Directed by Yoon Rima, Jang Dongju (Rigend Film Studio) versus the original being directed by Digipedi, was released on February 17, 2020, with the bold and glamorous manner through the image of "festivals".

== Commercial performance ==
In South Korea the song peaked at number three, becoming the group's first ever top 10 hit in the country. The song also hit number two on the K-pop Hot 100, becoming their highest-peaking song on the chart. On the US World Digital Song Sales chart, the song peaked at number 13. Despite being a Korean release, the song also entered the Billboard Japan Hot 100, peaking at number 6.

== Charts ==
=== Weekly charts ===
Chart (2020)	Peak position
Japan (Japan Hot 100)	6
South Korea (Circle Digital Chart)	3
South Korea (Kpop Hot 100)	2
US World Digital Songs (Billboard)	13

=== Year-end charts ===
Chart (2020)	Peak position
South Korea (Circle Digital Chart)	52

== Accolades ==
=== Music program wins ===
Program	Date	Ref.
The Show (SBS MTV)	February 25, 2020	
The Show (SBS MTV)	March 3, 2020	
Show Champion (MBC Music)	February 26, 2020	
M Countdown (Mnet)	February 27, 2020	

== See also ==
- List of M Countdown Chart winners (2020)
