= Run to You =

Run to You may refer to any of these songs:

- "Run to You" (Bryan Adams song)
- "Run to You" (Roxette song)
- "Run to You" (Whitney Houston song)
- "Run to You", a song by Flo Rida
- "Run to You", a song by Dina Carroll
- "Run to You", a song by Plus One
- "Run to You", a song by Anne Haigis
- "Run to You", a song by Quiet Riot from their second self-titled album
- "Run to You", a song by new age composer Ryan Farish
- "Run to You", a song by Twila Paris
- "Run to You", a song by LEDApple
- "Run to You", a song by Pentatonix from their album PTX, Vol. II
- "Run 2 U", a song by Jewel from her album 0304
- "Run2U", a song by STAYC
- "Run to You", a song by Lea Michele from her album Places
- "Run to You" (Planetboom song)

== Films ==
- Run to You (film), 2025 South Korean romantic sports drama

== See also ==
- "I Run to You", a song by Lady Antebellum
- Run with U (disambiguation)
