= Kwon Eun-bi =

South Korean singer (born 1995)

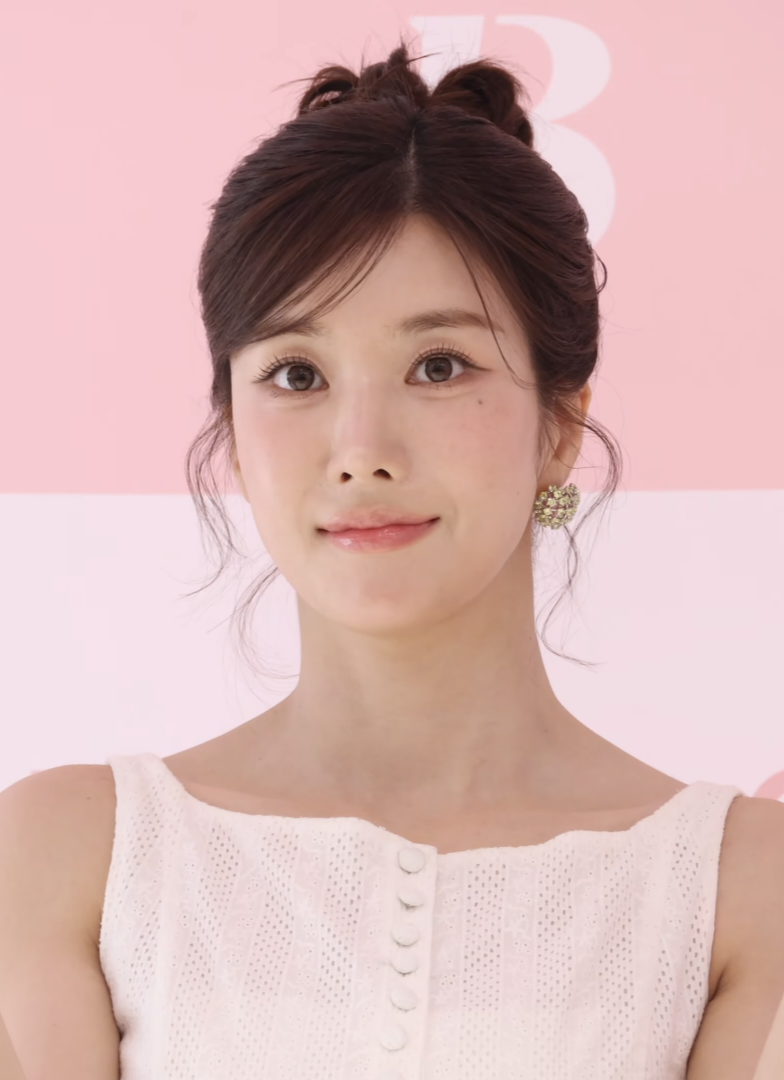
- Kwon in May 2026
- Born: September 27, 1995 (age 31); Seoul, South Korea
- Education: Dong-ah Institute of Media and Arts; School of Performing Arts Seoul
- Occupations: Singer; actress
- Relatives: Kang Ji-yong (cousin)
- Musical career
- Genre: K-pop
- Instrument: Vocals
- Years active: 2014–present
- Labels: Woollim; Off the Record (Note: As a member of Iz*One only.); EMI; RBW
- Formerly of: Ye-A; Iz*One
- Website: Official website

Korean name
- Hangul: 권은비
- RR: Gwon Eunbi
- MR: Kwŏn Ŭnbi

Kwon Eun-bi (Korean: 권은비; born September 27, 1995) is a South Korean singer and actress. She debuted as a member of the short lived girl group Ye-A under the stage name Kazoo. She participated in the Mnet reality competition series Produce 48, where she finished in 7th place and became a member and leader of the South Korean–Japanese girl group Iz*One on August 31, 2018.

Following Iz*One's disbandment in April 2021, she made her solo debut on August 24, 2021, with the release of her first mini album Open.

== Life and career ==
=== 1995–2017: Early life and pre-debut activities ===
Kwon Eun-bi was born on September 27, 1995, in Geumcheon District, Seoul. Her family consists of her parents and an older brother. She attended Dong-il Middle School and graduated from School of Performing Arts Seoul. In middle school, she expressed to her parents her desire to attend a dance academy. Her parents were initially against her becoming a singer, and told her to attend a dance academy only as a hobby, wanting her to focus on her studies instead. Determined to become a singer, she finally persuaded her parents by sending a letter to her other family members, asking for help in convincing her parents to let her attend an arts high school. When she was 17, she was a backup dancer for girl groups such as Secret and Girl's Day, and was encouraged by member Hyeri (who was her senior in high school) to pursue her aspirations of becoming an idol. During this time, she was also working part-time at a Paris Baguette store. Kwon debuted in the Kiroy Company-managed eight-member girl group Ye-A under the stage name 'Kazoo' on July 18, 2014, with the single "National Treasure". She presumably left the group along with fellow member Chai after they both were removed from the groups' Twitter bio. She auditioned for several entertainment companies afterwards, and signed a contract with Woollim Entertainment.

=== 2018–2020: Produce 48 and debut with Iz*One ===
Kwon Eun-bi was one of four trainees from Woollim Entertainment who participated on the Mnet girl group survival show Produce 48, a collaboration between the Mnet series Produce 101 and the J-pop idol group AKB48. She consistently ranked among the Top 12, eventually finishing in 7th place, which allowed her to debut as a member of Iz*One, alongside fellow Woollim Entertainment trainee Kim Chae-won, and was named the group's leader. They debuted on October 29, 2018, with the single "La Vie en Rose".

In 2019, she became a permanent cast member of the JTBC show Respect Your Style, Real Life alongside Jung Hyung-don and Ahn Jung-hwan which first aired in May and ended in August of the same year.

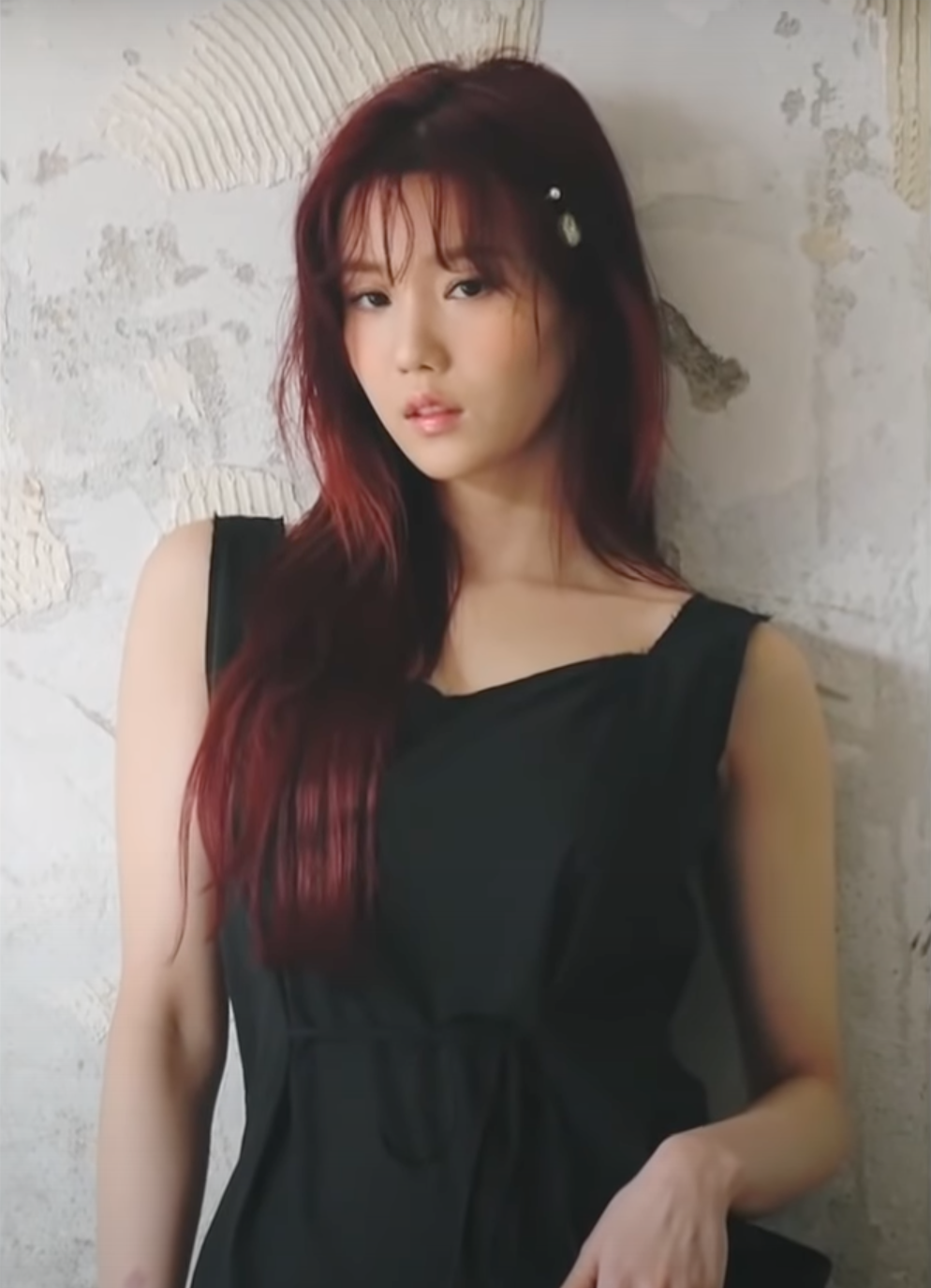
Kwon for Marie Claire Korea in May 2020

In February 2020, she made her debut as a songwriter and wrote and composed the song "Spaceship" which was released as a track for Iz*One's first studio album Bloom*Iz. The song charted at No. 130 on the Gaon Digital Chart. She wrote another song for their third mini-album Oneiric Diary entitled "With*One" as part of a songwriting team called Psycho Rabbit. It was released on June 15, 2020, and debuted at No. 152 on the Gaon Digital Chart.

=== 2021–present: Solo activities and solo debut ===
On March 29, 2021, her Woollim Entertainment labelmate Sungkyu released the music video for his single "Hush", in which she played the female lead.

After wrapping up Iz*One's promotions on April 29, with a final concert in March, Kwon returned to Woollim Entertainment with labelmate Kim Chae-won as trainees. On June 29, she became the new host of FashionN's beauty program Follow Me along with Ha Sung-woon, Pentagon's Kino, and Freezia. On August 4, Kwon's labelmates Rocket Punch released their debut Japanese album Bubble Up! which includes a track written and co-produced by Kwon titled "Let's Dance".

On August 5, Woollim Entertainment announced that Kwon was preparing to debut as a solo artist and would release her debut album at the end of the month. On August 24, Kwon released her first extended play Open, on which she received writing credits on two of the songs, including the lead single "Door." Following her debut as a soloist, Kwon was nominated for Rookie of the Year at the 36th Golden Disc Awards, Best New Female Artist at the 2021 Mnet Asian Music Awards and Rookie of the Year at the 31st Seoul Music Awards, and won Best Emotive Singer at the 2021 Asia Artist Awards. On December 28, Kwon and labelmate Rocket Punch's Juri Takahashi released the song "I'll Be Your Energy" as part of the soundtrack for Smilegate's mobile RPG Epic Seven.

From January 2022 to January 2023, Kwon hosted the monthly show Mubeat Live. On February 23, 2022, she released the song "Time" as part of the soundtrack for the Disney+ web series Rookie Cops. On March 10, Kwon released the promotional single "Esper" through Universe Music for the mobile application Universe. On March 24, Kwon Eun-bi was announced as a cast member for the musical Midnight Sun as Seo Haena, with Ha Sung-woon, Shinee's Onew, Pentagon's Jinho, Song Geon-hee, Golden Child's Y, Apink's Kim Nam-joo, and Lee Sang-a. On April 4, Kwon released her second extended play Color along with the title track "Glitch". On May 9, Woollim Entertainment announced that Kwon would hold her first solo concert "Secret Doors" on June 18 and 19. Later in May, Kwon was selected alongside KCM and Vromance's Park Hyun-kyu as hosts of the LGU+ music-based variety show Why Not Crew. In June, she was selected as a mentor in Mnet's band survival competition show Great Seoul Invasion. Later that month, she released the song "Oh My Boy" as part of the soundtrack for the TVING web series New Normal Zine.

On August 11, it was announced that Kwon's 'Rubi's Room' fan meeting would be held on October 30 and November 3 at Merpark in Osaka and Toyosu PIT in Tokyo; this was her first solo fan meeting to be held in Japan. On August 17, she released the song "Light" as part of the soundtrack for K-pop CTzen, a metaverse project based on Web3. On September 20, her agency Woollim Entertainment released a comeback poster for her third extended play, Lethality, through its official SNS channel. The EP was released on October 12. On November 7, Woollim Entertainment announced that Kwon would hold her second solo concert "Next Door" in Seoul on December 17 and 18.

In May 2023, she acted opposite Hyun Woo in the music video for KCM's "Even if You Call Me a Fool". The same month, she was confirmed to return for the second season of Why Not Crew. On June 23, Kwon received attention for her viral performance at Waterbomb Seoul 2023, which led to media outlets such as The Korea Economic Daily and Hankook Ilbo dubbing her as "Waterbomb Goddess" and the new "Summer Queen". Following her viral performance, "Underwater" resurged on Korean music charts, eventually peaking at number 78 on Circle Digital Chart, forty-five weeks after the single's release. Also in June, she was selected as the new radio DJ for the daily SBS Power FM radio show Young Street, with her first broadcast scheduled for July 3. Also in July, she was selected to host Maepjjiri Crossing the Line, a web variety show where Kwon tried various spicy foods.

On August 2, Kwon released her first single album, The Flash, along with the lead single of the same name. On August 8, she achieved her first music show win as a soloist on SBS M's The Show. On September 6, it was announced that Kwon would be holding her third solo concert "Queen" at the Blue Square Mastercard Hall in Seoul on October 7 and 8. On October 24, she released the digital single "Like Heaven", a collaboration with hip-hop artist Paul Blanco. On November 7, it was announced that Kwon had been cast as a host of the MBC dating show Alumni Lovers. On December 8, it was announced that Kwon would be making her acting debut in the Japanese film Stolen Identity 3. Five days later, she released "Can We Go Back to the Good Old Days" as part of the soundtrack of the Disney+ drama series Soundtrack 2.

On June 3, 2024, Woollim Entertainment announced that Kwon would be releasing her second single album Sabotage on June 18. On August 2, it was announced that Kwon would step down as the host of Kwon Eun-bi's Youngstreet. Her final broadcast was on August 4. On August 13, she featured on Hui's digital single "Easy Dance".

On January 7, 2025, Kwon released her digital single "Snowfall", which features Coogie. On April 2, Woollim Entertainment announced that Kwon would be releasing a digital single "Hello Stranger" on April 14.

On March 31, 2026, Kwon departed Woollim Entertainment and signed a contract with RBW on April 22. On August 20, RBW announced that Kwon would be releasing a digital single "Dejavu" on September 3, marking her first release under the agency.

== Endorsements ==
Kwon has modeled for various brands, including brands such as Sprite, beauty brand Nine Wishes, colored contact lens brand Lenstown, massage brand Spaal, chicken brand Jadam Chicken, shower filter brand Dr. P.L., and health food brand Phytotics. In December 2023, SPOTV noted Kwon's global influence as a rising model in the advertising world.

== Discography ==
=== Extended plays ===
Title	Details	Peak positions		Sales
Title	Details	KOR	JPN	Sales
Open	Released: August 24, 2021; Label: Woollim Entertainment; Formats: CD, digital download	8	34	KOR: 58,183; JPN: 1,696
Color	Released: April 4, 2022; Label: Woollim Entertainment; Formats: CD, digital download	4	—	KOR: 57,947
Lethality	Released: October 12, 2022; Label: Woollim Entertainment; Formats: CD, digital download	13	—	KOR: 46,188

=== Single albums ===
Title	Details	Peak positions	Sales
Title	Details	KOR	Sales
The Flash	Released: August 2, 2023; Label: Woollim Entertainment; Formats: CD, digital download; Track listing: 1. "The Flash"; 2. "Comet"; 3. "Beautiful Night"	19	KOR: 24,807
Sabotage	Released: June 18, 2024; Label: Woollim Entertainment; Formats: CD, digital download; Track listing: 1. "Sabotage"; 2. "Unnatural"; 3. "Bad Blood"	19	KOR: 11,711

=== Singles ===
==== As lead artist ====
Title	Year	Peak chart positions			Album
Title	Year	KOR	KOR Songs	US World	Album
"Door"	2021	— (Note: "Door" did not enter the Circle Digital Chart, but peaked at number 14 on the Circle Download Chart.)	—	3	Open
"Mirror"	2022	— (Note: "Mirror" did not enter the Circle Digital Chart, but peaked at number 61 on the Circle Download Chart.)	—	—	Non-album single
"Glitch"	2022	— (Note: "Glitch" did not enter the Circle Digital Chart, but peaked at number 13 on the Circle Download Chart.)	—	—	Color
"Underwater"	2022	78	19	—	Lethality
"The Flash"	2023	— (Note: "The Flash" did not enter the Circle Digital Chart, but peaked at number 32 on the Circle Download Chart.)	—	—	The Flash
"Like Heaven" (featuring Paul Blanco)	2023	— (Note: "Like Heaven" did not enter the Circle Digital Chart, but peaked at number 49 on the component Circle Download Chart.)	—	—	Non-album single
"Sabotage"	2024	— (Note: "Sabotage" did not enter the Circle Digital Chart, but peaked at number 21 on the component Circle Download Chart.)	—	—	Sabotage
"Please Summer!" (여름아 부탁해)	2024	135	—	—	Non-album singles
"Snowfall" (눈이 와) (featuring Coogie)	2025	— (Note: "Snowfall" did not enter the Circle Digital Chart, but peaked at number 26 on the component Circle Download Chart.)	—	—	Non-album singles
"Hello Stranger"	2025	— (Note: "Hello Stranger" did not enter the Circle Digital Chart, but peaked at number 20 on the component Circle Download Chart.)	—	—	Non-album singles
"Dejavu"	2026	— (Note: "Dejavu" did not enter the Circle Digital Chart, but peaked at number 24 on the component Circle Download Chart.)	—	—	Non-album singles
"—" denotes releases that did not chart or were not released in that region.

==== As featured artist ====
Title	Year	Peak chart positions	Album
Title	Year	KOR DL	Album
"Easy Dance" (Hui featuring Kwon Eun-bi)	2024	41	Non-album single

=== Promotional singles ===
Title	Year	Peak chart positions	Album
Title	Year	KOR DL	Album
"Esper" (Promotional single for Universe)	2022	60	Non-album single

=== Soundtrack appearances ===
List of soundtrack appearances, showing year released and album name
Title	Year	Peak chart positions	Album
Title	Year	KOR DL	Album
"I'll Be Your Energy" (with Juri Takahashi)	2022	147	Epic Seven OST
"Time"	2022	144	Rookie Cops OST Part 4
"Oh My Boy"	2022	127	New Normal Zine OST
"Light"	2022	175	K-Pop CTzen OST
"Can We Go Back to the Good Old Days"	2023	84	Soundtrack #2 OST

=== Other charted songs ===
List of songs, showing year released and album name
Title	Year	Peak chart positions	Album
Title	Year	KOR DL	Album
"Open"	2021	96	Open
"Amigo" (with Lee Su-jeong)	2021	72	Open
"Blue Eyes"	2021	80	Open
"Rain" (비 오는 길)	2021	78	Open
"Eternity"	2021	85	Open
"The Colors of Light"	2022	162	Color
"Magnetic"	2022	106	Color
"Colors"	2022	105	Color
"Speed of Love" (우리의 속도)	2022	128	Color
"Off"	2022	126	Color
"Wave"	2022	179	Lethality
"Croquis"	2022	139	Lethality
"Simulation"	2022	154	Lethality
"Flash"	2022	148	Lethality
"Off"	2022	146	Lethality
"Comet"	2023	111	The Flash
"Beautiful Night"	2023	108	The Flash
"Unnatural"	2024	102	Sabotage
"Bad Blood"	2024	104	Sabotage

=== Songwriting credits ===
All song credits are adapted from the Korea Music Copyright Association's database unless stated otherwise.

Title	Year	Album	Artist	Lyrics		Music	
Title	Year	Album	Artist	Credited	With	Credited	With
"Spaceship"	2020	Bloom*Iz	Iz*One	Yes	Elum (Prismfilter), Anchor (Prismfilter)	Yes	Nmore (Prismfilter), Elum (Prismfilter), Anchor (Prismfilter)
"With*One"	2020	Oneiric Diary	Iz*One	Yes	Iz*One	Yes	Jung Sung-min (Psycho Rabbit), Shin Yong-soo (Psycho Rabbit)
"Parallel Universe"	2021	Non-album single	Iz*One	Yes	e.one	Yes	e.one
"Let's Dance"	2021	Bubble Up!	Rocket Punch	No	N/A	Yes	Jung Sung-min (Psycho Tension), Shin Yong-soo (Psycho Tension), Mollo (Psycho Tension)
"Door"	2021	Open	Herself	Yes	e.one, Hwang Hyun (MonoTree)	No	N/A
"Rain"	2021	Open	Herself	Yes	e.one	Yes	e.one
"Mirror"	2022	Non-album Single	Herself	Yes	Jung Sung-min (Psycho Tension), Jang Woo-yong, Shin Ji-hoo (Postmen)	Yes	Jung Sung-min (Psycho Tension), Shin Ji-hoo (Postmen)
"Off"	2022	Color	Herself	No	N/A	Yes	Han-gil
"Hi"	2022	Lethality	Herself	Yes	—	Yes	Frants, Melanie Fontana
"Beautiful Night"	2023	The Flash	Herself	Yes	Zaya, Chai Lin, Lijune, True, Bay, Won Jae-yi, Koo Sam-young	No	N/A
"Snowfall" (with Coogie)	2025	Non-album Single	Herself	Yes	Coogie	Yes	Gray, Coogie

== Videography ==
=== Music videos ===
Title	Year	Director(s)	Ref.
"Door"	2021	Kim Ja Kyoung (Flexible Pictures)	
"Glitch"	2022	PARADOX CHILD	
"Esper"	2022	Yuri Lee (SL8 Visual Lab)	
"Underwater"	2022	PARADOX CHILD	
"The Flash"	2023	PARADOX CHILD	
"Like Heaven"	2023	Kim Jiwoo	
"Sabotage"	2024	Kim Ja Kyoung (Flexible Pictures)	
"Please Summer!" (여름아 부탁해)	2024	Lee Yoo-young, Lee Jae-hyun (SNP Film)	
"Hello Stranger"	2025	Novv Kim	
"Dejavu"	2026	Daehee Han (Myamya)	

=== Music video appearances ===
Year	Title	Artist	Ref.
2021	"Hush"	Sungkyu	
2023	"Even if I Call You a Fool"	KCM	
2024	"Voice"	Soran	

== Filmography ==
=== Film ===
Year	Title	Role	Notes	Ref.
2024	Stolen Identity: Final Hacking Game	Soo-min	Japanese film	

=== Television shows ===
Year	Title	Role	Notes	Ref.
2018	Produce 48	Contestant	Survival show that determined Iz*One members Finished 7th	
2019	Respect Your Style, Real Life	Cast member		
2021	Follow Me 14: Truth of Taste	Host		
2022	Great Seoul Invasion	Mentor		
2022	The Travel Blog	Cast member	with Lee Chae-yeon	
2023	Rustically: In Ulsan	Cast member	The second version of the fortified version of Rustically: In the Secret Island.	
2023	Alumni Lovers	Host		
2024	Starlight Boys	Guider	with Lee Seung-gi, Daesung, Choi Young-joon, Hanhae, Hui, Eric, Yoon	
2025	Undercover	Judge		

=== Web shows ===
Year	Title	Role	Notes	Ref.
2022–2023	Mubeat Live	Host		
2022–2023	Why Not Crew	Host		
2023	Maepjjiri Crossing the Line	Host		
2024	Zombieverse	Regular member	Season 2	

=== Radio shows ===
Year	Title	Role	Notes	Ref.
2022	Turn up the volume	Special DJ	August 18–19	
2023–2024	Kwon Eun-bi's Youngstreet	DJ	July 3, 2023 – August 4, 2024	

== Theater ==
Year	Title	Korean title	Role	Ref.
2022	ONAIR		DJ / Herself	
2022	Midnight Sun	태양의 노래	Seo Hae-na	

== Accolades ==
=== Awards and nominations ===
Name of the award ceremony, year presented, award category, nominee(s) of the award, and the result of the nomination
Award ceremony	Year	Category	Nominee / Work	Result	Ref.
Asia Artist Awards	2021	Best Emotive Singer Award	Kwon Eun-bi	Won	
Asia Artist Awards	2021	Female Solo Singer Popularity Award	Kwon Eun-bi	Nominated	
Asia Artist Awards	2023	Best Musician Award	Kwon Eun-bi	Won	
Asia Artist Awards	2026	Popularity Award – Solo (Female)	Kwon Eun-bi	Pending	
Asian Pop Music Awards (Note: Hosted by the Hong Kong Asia Pacific International Group and Sunway Records, the Asian Pop Music Awards bases its winners on "Asian Pop Music Chart" which opened in September 2019.)	2021	Best New Artist (Overseas)	Open	Nominated	
The Fact Music Awards	2023	Best Performer Award	Kwon Eun-bi	Won	
Hanteo Music Awards	2023	Emerging Artist Award	Kwon Eun-bi	Nominated	
Golden Disc Awards	2022	Rookie of the Year	Kwon Eun-bi	Nominated	
Golden Disc Awards	2022	Seezn Most Popular Artist Award	Kwon Eun-bi	Nominated	
MBC Entertainment Awards	2023	Rookie Award – Variety Show (Female)	Kwon Eun-bi	Nominated	
Mnet Asian Music Awards	2021	Album of the Year	Open	Longlisted	
Mnet Asian Music Awards	2021	Artist of the Year	Kwon Eun-bi	Longlisted	
Mnet Asian Music Awards	2021	Best New Female Artist	Kwon Eun-bi	Nominated	
SBS New Year Party	2024	Special Award – Radio DJ	Kwon Eun-bi's Youngstreet	Won	
Seoul Music Awards	2021	K-wave Popularity Award	Kwon Eun-bi	Nominated	
Seoul Music Awards	2021	Popularity Award	Kwon Eun-bi	Nominated	
Seoul Music Awards	2021	Rookie of the Year	Kwon Eun-bi	Nominated	
Seoul Music Awards	2021	U+Idol Live Best Artist Award	Kwon Eun-bi	Nominated	
Universal Superstar Awards	2024	Universal Hot Trend Icon	Kwon Eun-bi	Won	

=== Honors ===
Name of organization, year given, and the name of the honor
Organization	Year	Honor	Ref.
Newsis K-EXPO Cultural Awards (Note: Established in 2019 and co-sponsored by Korea's Ministry of Culture, Sports and Tourism, Ministry of Foreign Affairs, Korea Creative Content Agency, Seoul Metropolitan Council and the Seoul Tourism Organization, it awards cultural icons, businesses, and individuals who have contributed greatly to Hallyu, the Korean wave.)	2023	Seoul Tourism Organization CEO Award	
