= Open (Kwon Eun-bi EP) =

- Digital and "In" version cover

EP by Kwon Eun-bi
- Released: August 24, 2021
- Recorded: 2021
- Genre: K-pop
- Length: 18:46
- Language: Korean
- Labels: Woollim; Kakao

Kwon Eun-bi chronology
Open (2021)	Color (2022)

Singles from Open
- 1. "Door" Released: August 24, 2021

Professional ratings
Review scores
Source	Rating
IZM	3/5 stars

Open is the debut extended play by South Korean singer Kwon Eun-bi. The album consists of six songs including the lead single, "Door". It was released digitally and physically on August 24, 2021 by Woollim Entertainment and distributed by Kakao Entertainment.

== Background ==
After wrapping up promotions with her former group Iz*One on April 29, 2021, Kwon Eun-bi stated through an interview with Esquire magazine in July that she was planning on releasing an album sometime within the year. On August 5, 2021, South Korean media outlet Star News reported that Kwon Eun-bi would be the first member from Iz*One to make her solo debut and was filming the music video and doing photoshoots for her upcoming album which would be released at the end of August. Woollim Entertainment then confirmed on the same day that she was "working on making the final touches on her solo album". On August 9, it was revealed through a teaser image that the album would be released on August 24, 2021. On August 11, another teaser image was uploaded on the artist's official SNS accounts, revealing the title of the EP, Open. On August 19, it was confirmed through the album preview that the lead single would be called "Door". During the showcase for the album on August 24, Eunbi stated that she chose the title 'Open' for the album because she "wanted to open a new version of herself as a solo artist".

== Composition ==
The lead single "Door" is described as an electro swing song that uses brass instruments and has elements of jazz. The song was composed by Hwang Hyun (Monotree) and Jung Ho-hyun (e.one) whom Eunbi had previously worked with several times when she was a member of Iz*One. Its lyrics were co-written by Hwang Hyun, Jung Ho-hyun and Eunbi. The album also includes five other tracks. "Open" serves as the album's intro. "Amigo" is a moombahton and trap song written and composed by Inner Child (MonoTree) which features her labelmate Babysoul of Lovelyz. "Blue Eyes", written and composed by both DD! and James Keys, is described as an R&B and pop song that has a "dreamlike" synthesizer sound. "Rain" is an emotional ballad about heartbreak co-written and co-composed by Eunbi with Jung Ho-hyun (e.one). The final track "Eternity" is an acoustic pop song that is dedicated to her fans and is composed by Park Tae-jin with lyrics written by Kim Hyun-ah.

Eunbi was heavily involved in the overall concept, stage performance and album production and said "I tried to participate as much as I could in the production process, and I thought hard about how I could show various concepts and genres through the EP".

== Promotion ==
To promote the album, Woollim Entertainment released several concept photos and lyrics photos for each of the album's tracks. The singer also opened her official SNS accounts on Twitter, Instagram, YouTube and V Live. Track teasers for each song from the album were then released through the artist's official YouTube channel. Woollim Entertainment also announced that Eunbi would be holding online video fansigns and an album showcase through her V Live channel on August 24. A music video teaser for the lead single "Door" was released on August 22. The music video for "Door" was released on August 24 along with the EP. Eunbi held a showcase for the album on the day of its release where she performed three tracks from the album; "Door", "Blue Eyes" and "Eternity". The singer also made her debut stage on M! Countdown on August 26 where she performed the lead single "Door". She then continued to promote the song on several music programs in South Korea such as Music Bank, Show! Music Core, Inkigayo, The Show and Show Champion. She also appeared on various radio shows to promote the album such as Kim Shin Young's Noon Song of Hope and Wendy's Young Street.

=== Music video ===
For the music video, Eunbi drew inspiration from children's books, particularly Alice in Wonderland, where Eunbi can be seen navigating through colorful hallways and entering numerous doors into a fantasy world while wearing a crown with bunny ears. The singer also wanted the song and music video to feel like a musical, so she watched different musicals such as Fame, Chicago and Burlesque for references and stated that she "tried to pepper in a lot of musical elements for her choreography to highlight the visual aspects of her music". She explained that for the performance, she suggested decorating the stage as a Broadway musical and added "I think I was able to pull out dance moves with the dancers, and we were able to create a high-quality performance".

== Commercial performance ==
The lead single "Door" debuted at No. 3 on Billboard's World Digital Songs chart. In Japan, the album debuted at No. 34 on the Oricon Albums Chart. In South Korea, the album debuted at No. 8 on the Gaon Album Chart while "Door" debuted at No. 14 on the Gaon Download Chart. All of the album's other tracks also charted on the Gaon Download Chart.

== Track listing ==
Open track listing
No.	Title	Lyrics	Music	Arrangement	Length
1.	"Open"	Jung Ho-hyun (e.one); Hwang Hyun (Monotree)	Jung Ho-hyun (e.one); Hwang Hyun (Monotree)	Jung Ho-hyun (e.one); Hwang Hyun (Monotree)	0:56
2.	"Door"	Kwon Eun-bi; Jung Ho-hyun (e.one); Hwang Hyun (Monotree)	Jung Ho-hyun (e.one); Hwang Hyun (Monotree)	Jung Ho-hyun (e.one); Hwang Hyun (Monotree)	3:19
3.	"Amigo" (featuring Babysoul of Lovelyz)	Inner Child (MonoTree)	Inner Child (MonoTree)	Inner Child (MonoTree)	3:30
4.	"Blue Eyes"	DD!; James Keys	DD!; James Keys	James Keys	3:18
5.	"Rain" (Korean: 비 오는 길; RR: Bi Oneun Gil; lit. 'Rainy Day')	Kwon Eun-bi; Jung Ho-hyun (e.one)	Kwon Eun-bi; Jung Ho-hyun (e.one)	Jung Ho-hyun (e.one); BYMORE	4:17
6.	"Eternity"	Kim Hyun-ah	Park Tae-jin	Park Tae-jin	3:23
Total length:					18:46

== Charts ==
Chart performance for Open
Chart (2021)	Peak position
Japanese Albums (Oricon)	34
South Korean Albums (Gaon)	8

== Release history ==
Release dates and formats for Open
Region	Date	Format	Label	Ref.
Various	August 24, 2021	CD; digital download; streaming	Woollim	
South Korea	August 24, 2021	CD; digital download; streaming	Woollim; Kakao	
