= Color (EP) =

- Digital and B cover

EP by Kwon Eun-bi
- Released: April 4, 2022
- Recorded: 2022
- Genre: K-pop
- Length: 18:57
- Language: Korean
- Labels: Woollim; Kakao

Kwon Eun-bi chronology
Open (2021)	Color (2022)	Lethality (2022)

Singles from Color
- 1. "Glitch" Released: April 4, 2022

Color is the second extended play by South Korean singer Kwon Eun-bi. The album consists of six songs including the lead single, "Glitch". It was released digitally and physically on April 4, 2022 by Woollim Entertainment and distributed by Kakao Entertainment.

== Background ==
On March 21, alongside a series of teasers, it was officially announced that Kwon would be making her comeback in April with her second mini album Color. Alongside the first teaser image, four images titled "Color Mood" were released. Two of the images depict a hazy vibe with shafts of sunlight peeking through clouds of smoke, the other two images take on a blue hue. On March 22, the teaser schedule as well as three colour pieces was released. Following this, on March 23, two more underwater concept photos were released. The palette film and concept photo were released on March 24. On March 25, the third palette film and concept photo, showing a bright and bold red theme from the previously released piece. The fourth concept teaser, sound painting and music video teaser were released on March 26, 29 and 31 respectively.

On April 4, the second mini album along with the music video for the lead single "Glitch" were released.

== Composition ==
The EP consists of six tracks. The singer explained that "Glitch" illustrates that despite being "incomplete and flawed", even that side of her is "charming" and she "still has confidence" in herself.

== Track listing ==
Color track listing
No.	Title	Lyrics	Music	Arrangement	Length
1.	"The Colors of Light"		TAK	TAK	1:22
2.	"Glitch"	TAK; Corbin (NEWTYPE)	TAK; Corbin (NEWTYPE)	TAK; Corbin (NEWTYPE)	3:44
3.	"Magnetic"	진리 (Full8loom)	영광의 얼굴들 (Full8loom); 진리 (Full8loom)	영광의 얼굴들 (Full8loom)	3:03
4.	"Colors"	원택 (1Take)	원택 (1Take)	원택 (1Take)	3:39
5.	"Speed of Love" (Korean: 우리의 속도; RR: Uri-ui Sokdo; lit. 'We Speed')	이주형 (MonoTree)	이주형 (MonoTree); 김해론	이주형 (MonoTree)	3:55
6.	"Off"	Kassy, Han-gil	Kwon Eun-bi, Han-gil	Han-gil	3:12
Total length:					18:57

== Charts ==
Chart performance for Color
Chart (2022)	Peak position
South Korean Albums (Gaon)	4

== Release history ==
Release dates and formats for Color
Region	Date	Format	Label	Ref.
Various	April 4, 2022	CD; digital download; streaming	Woollim	
South Korea	April 4, 2022	CD; digital download; streaming	Woollim; Kakao	
