= Lethality (EP) =

- Digital cover

EP by Kwon Eun-bi
- Released: October 12, 2022
- Recorded: 2022
- Genre: K-pop
- Length: 17:06
- Language: Korean
- Label: Woollim; Kakao

Kwon Eun-bi chronology
Color (2022)	Lethality (2022)

Singles from Lethality
- 1. "Underwater" Released: October 12, 2022

Lethality is the third extended play by South Korean singer Kwon Eun-bi. The album consists of six songs including the lead single, "Underwater". It was released digitally and physically on October 12, 2022, by Woollim Entertainment and distributed by Kakao Entertainment.

== Background ==
On September 20, with a poster, Kwon announced her comeback with her third mini album, Lethality, which was released on October 12, around six months after her second EP, Color. The teaser image was released on September 23 while the scheduler was released on September 24. The concept photos 1 and 2 were released on September 28 and 30 respectively. The track list was released on October 3. The third and fourth concept photo were released on October 5 and 7 respectively.

== Track listing ==
Lethality track listing
No.	Title	Lyrics	Music	Arrangement	Length
1.	"Wave"		TAK	TAK	1:27
2.	"Underwater"	Cho Yoon-kyung	Toyo, Gabriel Brandes, Arineh Karim	Toyo	2:50
3.	"Croquis"	TAK, Corbin	TAK, Corbin	TAK, Corbin	3:07
4.	"Simulation"	DD!, James Keys	DD!, James Keys	James Keys	3:10
5.	"Flash" (produced by Park Moon-chi)	Park Moon-chi, Heo Seong-ju, Yoon Da-hye, Deulrejang	Park Moon-chi, Heo Seong-ju, Yoon Da-hye, Deulrejang	Park Moon-chi	3:18
6.	"Hi"	Kwon Eun-bi	Frants, Melanie Joy Fontana, Kwon Eun-bi	Frants	3:14
Total length:					17:06

== Charts ==
=== Weekly charts ===
Weekly chart performance for Lethality
Chart (2022)	Peak position
South Korean Albums (Circle)	13

=== Monthly charts ===
Monthly chart performance for Lethality
Chart (2022)	Peak position
South Korean Albums (Circle)	35

== Release history ==
Release dates and formats for Lethality
Region	Date	Format	Label	Ref.
Various	October 12, 2022	CD; digital download; streaming	Woollim	
South Korea	October 12, 2022	CD; digital download; streaming	Woollim; Kakao	
