= Absolute Value of Romance =

2026 South Korean television series

- Promotional poster
- Hangul: 로맨스의 절댓값
- RR: Romaenseuui jeoldaetgap
- MR: Romaensŭŭi chŏltaekkap
- Genre: Romantic comedy; Teen drama
- Written by: Lee Min-joo
- Directed by: Lee Tae-gon; Kim Jun-hyung
- Starring: Kim Hyang-gi; Cha Hak-yeon; Kim Jae-hyun; Son Jeong-hyeok; Kim Dong-gyu
- Country of origin: South Korea
- Original language: Korean
- No. of episodes: 16

Production
- Production companies: Good Wave, Inc.; Borderless Film; Mediacorp

Original release
- Network: Coupang Play
- Release: April 17 – May 29, 2026

Absolute Value of Romance (Korean: 로맨스의 절댓값) is a 2026 South Korean television series written by Lee Min-joo and directed by Lee Tae-gon and Kim Jun-hyung. Starring Kim Hyang-gi, Cha Hak-yeon, Kim Jae-hyun, Son Jeong-hyeok, and Kim Dong-gyu, the series follows a high school girl who writes BL romance novels featuring her handsome teachers, only to find herself unexpectedly entangled with them in real life. It premiered on Coupang Play on April 17, 2026, at 20:00 (KST) and is also available for streaming on Amazon Prime Video internationally.

== Synopsis ==
Yeo Eui-ju is an ordinary high school sophomore. Secretly, she is also a failed BL web novel writer. Across 100 serialized episodes, her story gets at most two views. One day, her life changes with the arrival of four attractive teachers who inspire her stories: Ga Ui-su, a math genius scarred by past trauma; Noh Da-ju, a charismatic polyglot and Ui-su's close friend since third grade; Jung Gi-jeon, a kind former athlete who recognizes Eui-ju's athletic talent; and Yoon Dong-ju, a Korean literature expert with a calm and respectful demeanor. She includes all four of them in her new novel, which, to her surprise, finally becomes a hit. But her math teacher, Ui-su, her worst enemy, discovers her secret. She accepts the deal he offers in exchange for his silence, but while gaining popularity, she must also face the challenge of finishing her math homework and managing her personal life.

== Cast and characters ==
=== Main ===
- Kim Hyang-gi as Yeo Eui-ju

A student by day and a BL writer by night. Passionately writing BL web novels under the pen name Imuk, while dreaming of literary success. Though she’s dedicated, her stories initially go unnoticed. Eui-ju is observant and empathetic, yet when it comes to love, she’s inexperienced and often insecure in real life. She effortlessly blurs the lines between reality and imagination, with her own distinctive flair. Her identity as a BL novel writer is kept hidden from others; only her brother knows.

- Cha Hak-yeon as Ga U-su

A cold, brilliant math prodigy born into a family of renowned mathematicians, he abandoned his plans to study abroad after a life-changing incident nearly blinded him.

- Kim Jae-hyun as Noh Da-ju

A polyglot. He is a mischievous Japanese teacher from a wealthy family, who is U-su's longtime friend.

- Son Jeong-hyeok as Jung Gi-jeon

A PE teacher, who recognizes Eui-ju’s exceptional running talent and sees her as his next prodigy. He became the first Korean athlete to place fourth in the league at the Winter Games.

- Kim Dong-gyu as Yoon Dong-ju

A Korean literature teacher, who treats students with courtesy, uses honorifics without fail, and keeps his temper no matter what. Often mistaken for the youngest due to his youthful looks, he’s in fact the oldest of the four teachers.

=== Supporting ===
- Kim So-hee as Choi Go-ya

Eui-ju's best friend, who is a talented art student.

- Yoon Hye-rim as Choi Ji-ah

Eui-ju's classmate with emotional scars from her life.

- Jung Da-on as Na Deu-rim

A Mathematics teacher in Eui-ju's school, she is the first Korean Fields Medalist.

- Jang Jae-young as Kim Dan-ji

Eui-ju's friend.

- Han Se-hee as Kim Young-jae

Eui-ju's friend.

- Noh Joo-eun as Eun Ha-soo

Eui-ju's classmate who is also a Mathematics genius.

- Gladys Bay as Jenny

Eui-ju's friend, who is an exchange student from Singapore.

- Yang So-min as Yun-ju

Eui-ju's mother.

== Production ==
In late 2025, Kim Hyang-gi, Kim Jae-hyun, and Cha Hak-yeon were reportedly cast, and filming commenced. By February 2026, Kim Hyang-gi, Cha Hak-yeon, Kim Jae-hyun, Son Jeong-hyeok, and Kim Dong-gyu were officially confirmed to lead the drama Absolute Value of Romance. Lee Tae-gon, who helmed Hello, My Twenties! (2017) and True to Love (2023), was attached to co-direct with Kim Jun-hyung, and the screenplay is written by Lee Min-joo. The production is handled by Good Wave, Inc. and Borderless Film, with co-production by Singaporean broadcasting company Mediacorp.

== Release ==
Absolute Value of Romance premiered on Coupang Play on April 17, 2026, at 20:00 (KST) and is also available for streaming on Amazon Prime Video internationally.

== Original soundtrack ==
=== Part 1 ===
Released on April 17, 2026
No.	Title	Lyrics	Music	Artist	Length
1.	"Real Fantasy"	Mao	Song Hyeon-jong; Viola; Naiv	Viola	3:02
2.	"Real Fantasy" (Inst.)		Song Hyeon-jong; Viola; Naiv		3:02
Total length:					6:04

=== Part 2 ===
Released on April 25, 2026
No.	Title	Lyrics	Music	Artist	Length
1.	"Sweet & Sour"	16	16; Do.ne	Say My Name	3:24
2.	"Sweet & Sour - Male Version"		16; Do.ne	16	3:26
3.	"Sweet & Sour" (Inst.)		16; Do.ne		3:24
4.	"Sweet & Sour - Male Version" (Inst.)		16; Do.ne		3:26
Total length:					13:41

=== Part 3 ===
Released on May 1, 2026
No.	Title	Lyrics	Music	Artist	Length
1.	"Why the Night"	Viola	Viola; Son Hyeon-jong	Cha Hak-yeon; Gongwon	5:09
2.	"Why the Night" (Inst.)		Viola; Son Hyeon-jong		5:08
Total length:					10:19
