= Run with U =

Run with U may refer to:

- "Run with U" (Fairies song), 2014
- "Run with U" (Mamagama song), 2025

== See also ==
- "(Til I) Run With You" by The Lovin' Spoonful from Revelation: Revolution '69, 1968
- Run to You (disambiguation)
