= Dahyun =

South Korean singer and actress (born 1998)

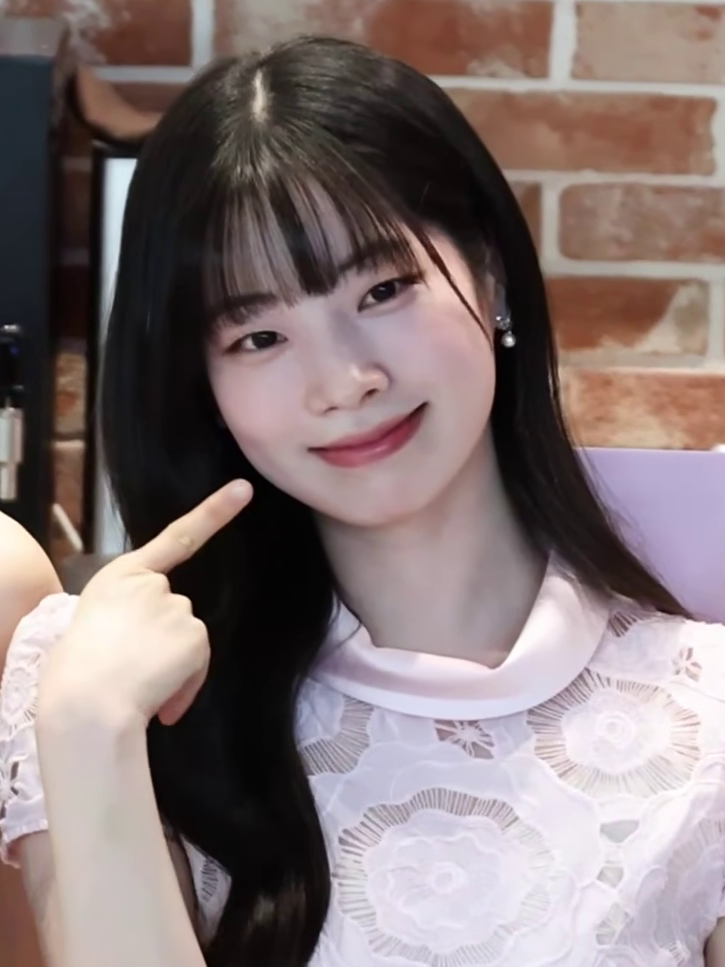
- Dahyun in 2026
- Born: Kim Da-hyun; May 28, 1998 (age 28); Seongnam, South Korea
- Education: Hanlim Multi Art School
- Occupations: Singer; rapper; actress
- Musical career
- Genres: K-pop; J-pop
- Instrument: Vocals
- Years active: 2015–present
- Labels: JYP; Warner Japan; Republic
- Member of: Twice; JYP Nation

Korean name
- Hangul: 김다현
- RR: Gim Dahyeon
- MR: Kim Tahyŏn

Kim Da-hyun (Korean: 김다현; born May 28, 1998), known mononymously as Dahyun, is a South Korean singer, rapper, and actress. She is a member of the South Korean girl group Twice, formed by JYP Entertainment in 2015.

Dahyun made her acting debut in 2025 with the film You Are the Apple of My Eye, where she received several Best New Actress awards. She later appeared in the independent film Run to You (2025) and in the television series Love Me (2025–2026).

== Early life and education ==
Dahyun was born in Seongnam, Gyeonggi, on May 28, 1998. She grew up with her parents and an older brother. As a child, she sang in her Christian church choir and took part in school talent shows. She considered becoming a piano teacher or a prosecutor before pursuing a career in entertainment. Dahyun graduated from Hanlim Multi Art School in 2017. She later became the first member of Twice to pursue acting and said it had been a long-standing goal supported by her mother since childhood.

== Career ==
=== Pre-debut activities ===
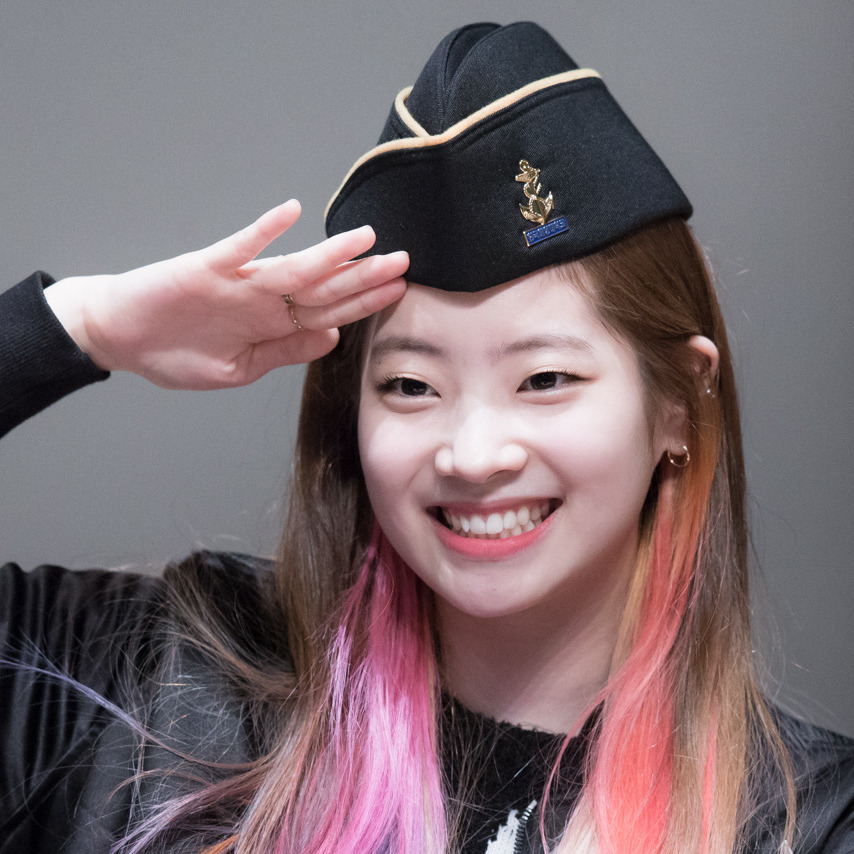
Dahyun in 2015

Dahyun first gained attention in the sixth grade after performing a dance at church, which came to be known as the "eagle dance". The dance was later uploaded to YouTube, where it gained further attention. She later auditioned for SM, YG, and JYP and was accepted by all three agencies. After being scouted at a dance festival, she chose to join JYP and trained there for over three years. In 2014, she appeared as the main female character in the music video for Got7's "Stop Stop It". The following year, she competed in Sixteen, a reality television show that determined the lineup of JYP's new girl group. She finished among the nine selected contestants and debuted in Twice as a singer and rapper.

=== 2015–present: Debut with Twice and acting career ===
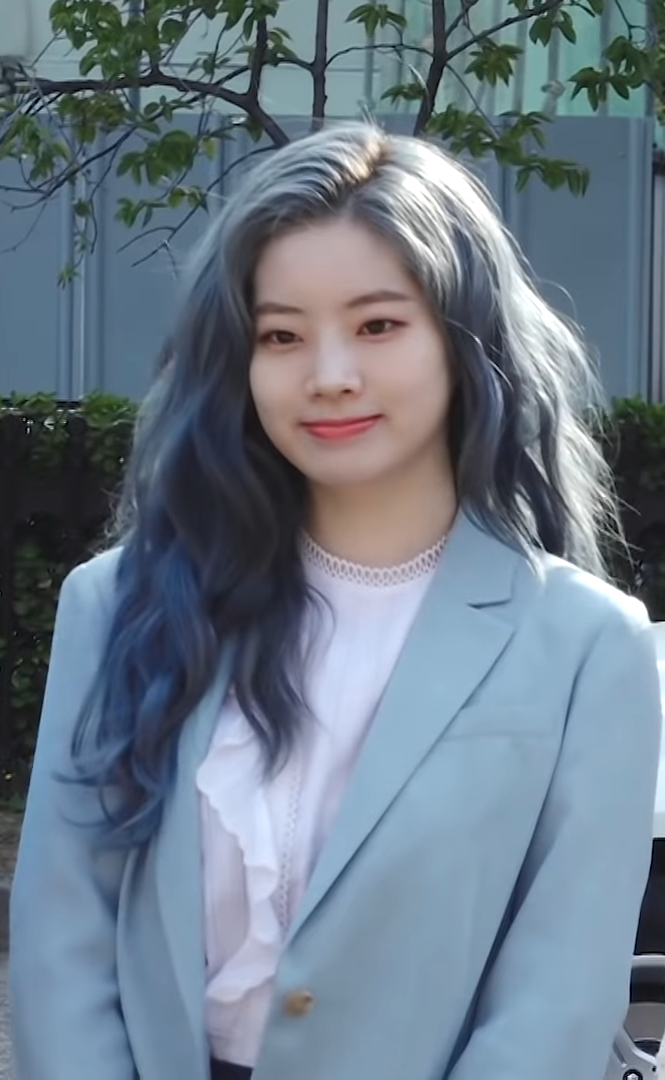
Dahyun at the KBS Music Bank 2019

Dahyun debuted with Twice in October 2015 with the release of the extended play (EP), The Story Begins. Its lead single "Like Ooh-Ahh" later became the first K-pop debut song to reach 100 million views on YouTube. In February 2016, she joined the cast of the variety show Real Man, which followed celebrities experiencing military life. In 2017, Dahyun ranked seventeenth in Gallup Korea's annual poll of the most popular idols in South Korea. In subsequent years, she appeared as a host on several South Korean music and variety television programs.

In November 2018, right-wing Japanese lawmaker Masaru Onodera criticized Dahyun for wearing a T-shirt produced by Marymond, an organization that raises funds to support comfort women who were victims of sexual slavery by the Imperial Japanese Army during World War II. Following the criticism, The Korea Times criticized J. Y. Park, founder of JYP Entertainment, for not publicly defending her.

Beginning with Feel Special (2019), Dahyun increased her contributions to the group's music by writing multiple songs and established herself as one of Twice's primary lyricists. In 2023, she appeared as the female lead in the music video for "Nothing But" by Young K of Day6.

On May 4, 2024, it was announced that Dahyun would make her acting debut in the independent film Run to You. She was also cast in You Are the Apple of My Eye, a Korean remake of the 2011 Taiwanese film of the same name. The film premiered at the 29th Busan International Film Festival in October 2024. The performance received positive critical attention, and she later received the Rising Star Award at the Busan International Film Festival, the Best New Actress award at the Seoul Global Movie Awards, and the New Star Award at the 29th Chunsa Film Art Awards.

In 2025, Dahyun was cast as Ji Hye-on, an aspiring novelist, in the melodrama Love Me, a Korean remake of the Swedish television series Älska mig (2019–2020). Reviews of the series noted her development as an actress following her film debut, and her performance earned her a nomination for Best Newcomer at the Global OTT Awards. That year, her first solo track "Chess" was included in Twice's tenth anniversary album Ten: The Story Goes On.

On February 11, 2026, JYP announced that Dahyun had sustained an ankle fracture and would miss the remaining North American dates of the group's This Is For World Tour. On April 24, 2026, it was confirmed that she would resume activities beginning with the group's performances at Japan's National Stadium. On September 22, 2026, it was announced that Dahyun had been cast as the lead in the romance film Cloudy with love alongside Cha Woo-min. On October 24, 2026, Dahyun moderated a film masterclass featuring Michel Hazanavicius, director of the Academy Award-winning film The Artist at the Bucheon International Animation Festival.

== Artistry ==
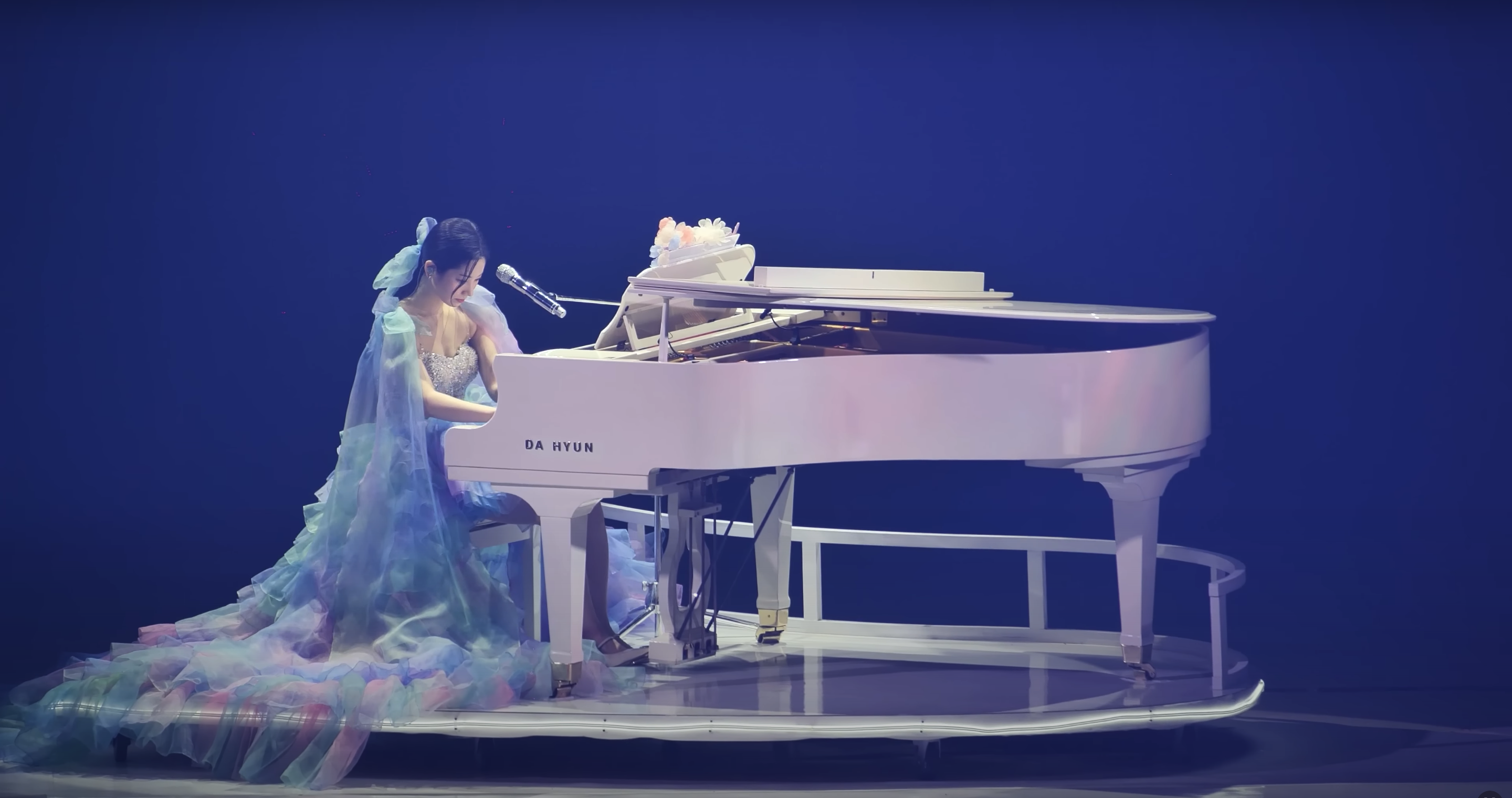
Dahyun performing at Twice's 5th World Tour "Ready to Be"

Dahyun is known to have absolute pitch. She plays several instruments, most notably the piano, which she has performed during Twice's tours. She has also demonstrated the ability to play the drums. Brea Cubit of Elle described her as a skilled pianist. Her piano performance during Twice's Ready to Be World Tour was noted by critics, including writer Bobby Olivier of NJ.com, who highlighted the group's MetLife Stadium show as a moment where a member displayed their proficiency with an instrument. Dahyun has stated that the piano provides her with "comfort" and "peace". As a rapper, she is noted for her punchy line delivery and expressiveness.

=== Songwriting and influences ===
Dahyun began contributing lyrics to Twice's music in 2017 with "Missing U". Her contributions became more regular starting with the release of Feel Special in 2019. Since then, she has written numerous tracks, including "Cruel", "Gone", and "Crazy Stupid Love", which explore themes of love and heartbreak. Tanu I. Raj of NME commented on her lyrics in songs such as "Cruel" and "Scandal", noting her developing role as a lyricist within the group. Her song "Blame It on Me", from the twelfth EP Ready to Be, was included on Dazed's list of the 50 best K-pop tracks of 2023. She also contributed to the songwriting and composition of the soundtrack for the film You Are the Apple of My Eye. Dahyun has said she often gets ideas for lyrics while traveling and has cited 2PM, Wonder Girls and Rain as early influences on her as a performer.

== Other activities ==
=== Fashion and endorsements ===
In March 2021, Dahyun and bandmate Sana were selected as the models for the skincare brand A'pieu. In April 2022, she renewed her contract with A'pieu until 2024. In July 2023, Dahyun was announced as the global brand ambassador for the American fashion brand Michael Kors. On September 10, 2024, Dahyun made her runway debut at New York Fashion Week, wearing the Michael Kors 2025 Spring/Summer collection.

Dahyun has appeared in various fashion magazines including GQ Korea, Vogue Japan, Elle Japan, and Allure Korea. She was featured on the cover of Nylon Japan's April 2025 issue and on the cover of the 2026 spring issue of MAPS Korea for the magazine's 20th anniversary.

=== Philanthropy ===
In 2020, Dahyun donated ₩50 million (equivalent to ₩58.3 million or US$43,500.37 in 2025) to the Community Chest of Korea to help prevent the spread of the COVID-19 virus. In March 2025, she donated ₩50 million (US$37,305.75) to the Community Chest of Korea to support the recovery efforts from the Ulsan wildfires. In 2026, she donated ₩30 million (US$22,383.45) to the Community Chest of Korea to fund medical treatment costs for leukemia patients in Ulsan.

== Discography ==
=== Soundtrack appearances ===
List of soundtrack appearances, showing year released, and name of the album
Title	Year	Peak chart positions	Album
Title	Year	KOR Down.	Album
"You Are the Apple of My Eye" (with Jinyoung)	2025	88	You Are the Apple of My Eye OST

=== Other charted songs ===
List of other charted songs, showing year released, selected chart positions and name of the album
Title	Year	Peak chart positions	Album
Title	Year	KOR Down.	Album
"Chess" (Note: credited to Twice, but the track is a solo by Dahyun)	2025	188	Ten: The Story Goes On

=== Songwriting credits ===
All song credits are adapted from the Korea Music Copyright Association's database unless stated otherwise.

List of songs, showing year released, artist name, and name of the album
Title	Year	Artist	Album	Notes	Ref
"Missing U"	2017	Twice	Twicetagram	As lyricist	
"Trick it"	2019	Twice	Feel Special	As lyricist	
"21:29"	2019	Twice	Feel Special	As lyricist	
"Bring It Back"	2020	Twice	Eyes Wide Open	As lyricist	
"Queen"	2020	Twice	Eyes Wide Open	As lyricist	
"Scandal"	2021	Twice	Taste of Love	As lyricist	
"SOS"	2021	Twice	Taste of Love	As lyricist	
"Cruel"	2021	Twice	Formula of Love: O+T=<3	As lyricist	
"Celebrate"	2022	Twice	Celebrate	As lyricist	
"Tick Tock"	2022	Twice	Celebrate	As lyricist	
"That's All I'm Saying"	2022	Twice	Celebrate	As lyricist	
"Gone"	2022	Twice	Between 1&2	As lyricist	
"When We Were Kids"	2022	Twice	Between 1&2	As lyricist	
"Blame It on Me"	2023	Twice	Ready to Be	As lyricist	
"Crazy Stupid Love"	2023	Twice	Ready to Be	As lyricist	
"You Get Me"	2024	Twice	With You-th	As lyricist	
"Keeper"	2024	Twice	Strategy	As lyricist	
"Mamushi (Remix)"	2024	Megan Thee Stallion (featuring Twice)	Megan: Act II	As lyricist	
"You Are the Apple of My Eye"	2025	Jinyoung, Dahyun	You Are the Apple of My Eye Original Soundtrack	As lyricist and composer	
"Up to You"	2025	Twice	Enemy	As lyricist	
"Glow"	2025	Twice	Enemy	As lyricist	
"Me+You"	2025	Twice	Ten: The Story Goes On	As lyricist	
"Chess" (Dahyun solo)	2025	Twice	Ten: The Story Goes On	As lyricist	

== Filmography ==
=== Film ===
Year	Title	Role	Ref.
2025	You Are the Apple of My Eye	Oh Sun-ah	
2025	Run to You	Ji-eun	

=== Television series ===
Year	Title	Role	Ref.
2025–2026	Love Me	Ji Hye-on	

=== Television shows ===
Year	Title	Role	Note	Ref.
2015	Sixteen	Contestant	Survival show which determined Twice members, finished 3rd	
2016	Weekly Idol	Fixed panelist	"Idols are the Best" corner (Episode 249–283)	
2016	Real Man	Cast member	Female edition 4	
2018	2018 KBS Song Festival	MC	with Chanyeol (Exo) and Jin (BTS)	
2019	2019 Idol Star Lunar New Year Athletics Bowling Archery Rhythmic Gymnastics Penalty Shoot-out Championships	Announcer		
2020	2020 Lunar New Year Idol Star Championships	Announcer		
2022	2022 Chuseok Idol Star Championships	Host		

=== Music video appearances ===
Year	Song title	Artist	Ref.
2014	"Stop stop it" (하지하지마)	Got7	
2023	"Nothing But" (이것밖에는 없다)	Young K	

== Bibliography ==
=== Photobooks ===
Title	Release date	Publisher	Ref.
Yes, I am Dahyun.	April 26, 2022	JYP Entertainment	

== Awards and nominations ==
Name of the award ceremony, year presented, category, work nominated, and award result
Award ceremony	Year	Category	Nominee / Work	Result	Ref.
Busan International Film Festival with Marie Claire Asia Star Awards	2024	Rising Star Award	You Are the Apple of My Eye	Won	
Asia Star Entertainer Awards	2025	Fan Choice Artist (Actress)	Dahyun	Nominated	
Asia Star Entertainer Awards	2025	Fan Choice (Character)	Dahyun (as Oh Sun-ah); You Are the Apple of My Eye	Nominated	
Asia Star Entertainer Awards	2025	Fan Choice (Couple)	Dahyun (with Jinyoung); You Are the Apple of My Eye	Nominated	
Chunsa International Film Festival	2025	New Star Award	You Are the Apple of My Eye	Won	
Seoul Global Movie Awards	2025	Best New Actress	You Are the Apple of My Eye	Won	
Global OTT Awards	2026	People's Choice Award (Female)	Love Me	Nominated	
Global OTT Awards	2026	Best Newcomer (Female)	Love Me	Nominated	
Global OTT Awards	2026	Rising Star of the Year	Love Me	Won	
