= Oneiric Diary =

- Digital and "Oneiric 환상" version cover

EP by Iz*One
- Released: June 15, 2020
- Recorded: May 2020
- Genre: K-pop; pop; dancehall; disco
- Length: 24:00
- Language: Korean; Japanese
- Label: Off the Record; Swing Entertainment
- Producer: MosPick; Real-fantasy; Bull$EyE; Jung Ho-hyun; KZ; HoneySweet; Psycho Rabbit

Iz*One chronology
Bloom*Iz (2020)	Oneiric Diary (2020)	Twelve (2020)

Singles from Oneiric Diary
- 1. "Secret Story of the Swan" Released: June 15, 2020

Oneiric Diary (Korean: 환상일기; Hanja: 幻想日記; RR: Hwansang ilgi) is the third extended play by South Korean–Japanese girl group Iz*One. It was released on June 15, 2020, by Off the Record Entertainment. The album is available in three versions: Diary, Oneiric and 3D, and consists of eight tracks including the lead single, "Secret Story of the Swan".

== Background ==
On May 12, it was announced that they would be having a summer comeback and would be releasing the 3rd season of their reality show Iz*One Chu. On May 19, it was confirmed that the group would release their third mini-album Oneiric Diary on June 15. On June 15, the company announced that the music video release will be postponed to June 16, while the performance video and album will be released on the original schedule given. The group held the comeback showcase for their album on Mnet's second channel M2.

== Commercial performance ==
On June 22, it was reported that the album broke the record of first week sales on Hanteo among girl groups, with 389,334 copies sold on its first 7 days.

== Track listing ==
Oneiric Diary track listing
No.	Title	Lyrics	Music	Arrangement	Length
1.	"Welcome" (Intro)	MosPick	MosPick	MosPick	1:25
2.	"Secret Story of the Swan" (환상동화; Hwansangdonghwa; lit. Fantasy Fairytale)	MosPick	MosPick	MosPick	3:12
3.	"Pretty"	Bull$EyE; real-fantasy; Green	real-fantasy; Bull$EyE	real-fantasy; Bull$EyE	3:19
4.	"Merry-Go-Round" (회전목마; Hoejeonmongma)	Hitomi Honda	Jung Ho-hyun (e.one)	Jung Ho-hyun (e.one)	3:00
5.	"Rococo"	KZ; B.O.; PUYO	KZ; HONEYSWEAT; B.O.; PUYO	KZ; HONEYSWEAT	3:13
6.	"With*One"	Iz*One	Psycho Rabbit (Note: Consists of Kwon Eun-bi, Jung Sung-min and Shin Yong-soo)	Psycho Rabbit	3:39
7.	"Secret Story of the Swan (Japanese Ver.)" (幻想童話; Gensō Dōwa)	MosPick; Sakura Miyawaki; Nako Yabuki	MosPick	MosPick	3:12
8.	"Merry-Go-Round (Japanese Ver.)"	Hitomi Honda	Jung Ho-hyun (e.one)	Jung Ho-hyun (e.one)	3:00
Total length:					24:04

== Charts ==
Sales chart performance of Oneiric Diary
Chart (2020)	Peak position
Japan Hot Albums (Billboard Japan)	3
Japanese Albums (Oricon)	4
South Korean Albums (Gaon)	2

== Certifications and sales ==
Region	Certification	Certified units/sales
South Korea (KMCA)	2× Platinum	500,000^{^}
^{^} Shipments figures based on certification alone.

== See also ==
- List of certified albums in South Korea

== Release history ==
Region	Date	Format	Label
South Korea	June 29, 2020	CD; digital download; streaming	Off the Record Entertainment; Stone Music Entertainment
Various	June 29, 2020	Digital download, streaming	Off the Record Entertainment; Stone Music Entertainment
