= 2020 Lunar New Year Idol Star Championships =

- Also known as: 2020 Idol Star Championships Lunar New Year Special
- Genre: Sports; Variety show
- Presented by: Jun Hyun-moo; Leeteuk; Dahyun(Twice)
- Country of origin: South Korea
- Original language: Korean
- No. of episodes: 9

Production
- Production location: Namdong Gymnasium
- Running time: 180 minutes

Original release
- Network: MBC
- Release: January 24 – January 27, 2020

The 2020 Idol Star Championships Lunar New Year Special (Korean: 2020 설특집 아이돌스타 선수권대회) was held at Namdong Gymnasium in Incheon was broadcast on MBC on 24–27 January 2020.

== Cast ==
=== Presenters ===
Jun Hyun-moo, Super Junior's Leeteuk and Dahyun (Twice).

=== Main ===
Full 2020 ISAC Lunar New Year's line-up

== Results ==
=== Men ===
Athletics

| Event | Gold | Silver | Bronze |
|---|---|---|---|
| 60 m | YunSung (Noir) | Hwalchan (GreatGuys) | Bang Chan (Stray Kids) |
| 4 × 100 m | Golden Child | VERIVERY | DONGKIZ |

Archery

| Event | Gold | Silver | Bronze |
|---|---|---|---|
| Men's Team | NCT Dream | Monsta X | No Winner |

Ssireum

| Event | Gold | Silver | Bronze |
|---|---|---|---|
| Men's Team | Ateez | Golden Child | No Winner |

Penalty Shoot-out

| Event | Gold | Silver | Bronze |
|---|---|---|---|
| Penalty Shoot-out | SF9 | Kim Jae-hwan, Jeong Se-woon, Ha Sung-woon | Golden Child |

=== Women ===
Athletics

| Event | Gold | Silver | Bronze |
|---|---|---|---|
| 60 m | May (Cherry Bullet) | Yuji (3YE) | Jiwon (Cherry Bullet) |
| 4 × 100 m | Cherry Bullet | Nature | Cosmic Girls |

Archery

| Event | Gold | Silver | Bronze |
|---|---|---|---|
| Women's Team | Gugudan | Cosmic Girls | No Winner |

Ssireum

| Event | Gold | Silver | Bronze |
|---|---|---|---|
| Women's Team | Cherry Bullet | Momoland | |

Pitching

| Event | Gold | Silver | Bronze |
|---|---|---|---|
| Women | Bomi (Apink) | Yeji (Itzy) | Chuu (Loona) |

Fastest Pitch : Chuu (Loona)

=== Mixed ===
Esports

| Event | Gold | Silver | Bronze |
|---|---|---|---|
| Fifa Online 4 | Kim Jae-hwan, Ha Sung-woon | PENTAGON | |
| PUBG Solo | Ha Sung-woon | Park Ji-hoon | Y (Golden Child) |
| PUBG Squad | United team | SF9 | N.Flying |
| PUBG Practice Solo | Park Ji-hoon | Nayun (Momoland) | |

Horseback riding

| Event | Gold | Silver | Bronze |
|---|---|---|---|
| Individual | Haknyeon (The Boyz) | Kenta (JBJ95) | Dayoung (Cosmic Girls) |

== Ratings ==
| Episode # | Original broadcast date | AGB Nielsen Ratings |
| Episode # | Original broadcast date | Nationwide |
|---|---|---|
| 1 | January 24, 2020 | 3.8% |
| 2 | January 25, 2020 | 2.3% |
| 3 | January 26, 2020 | 4.2% |
