= Soundtrack 1 =

2022 South Korean web series

Soundtrack #1
- Promotional poster
- Also known as: Soundtrack No. 1
- Hangul: 사운드트랙 #1
- RR: Saundeuteuraek #1
- MR: Saundŭt'ŭraek #1
- Genre: Romance; Music
- Created by: NHN Bugs (planning and production investment)
- Written by: Ahn Sae-bom
- Directed by: Kim Hee-won
- Starring: Park Hyung-sik; Han So-hee
- Music by: Park Se-joon
- Country of origin: South Korea
- Original language: Korean
- No. of episodes: 4

Production
- Running time: 40 minutes
- Production companies: Red Nine Pictures; Xanadu Entertainment

Original release
- Network: Disney+
- Release: March 23 – April 13, 2022

Related
- Soundtrack #2

Soundtrack #1 (Korean: 사운드트랙 #1) is a South Korean television series starring Park Hyung-sik and Han So-hee. It was released on Disney+ on March 23, 2022, in selected territories.

Soundtrack #2, a standalone sequel to the series, was released in 2023.

== Synopsis ==
A man and a woman who have been best friends for 20 years, get to know each other while staying in the same house for two weeks.

== Cast ==
=== Main ===
- Park Hyung-sik as Han Seon-woo, a photographer.
- Han So-hee as Lee Eun-soo, a lyricist.

=== Supporting ===
- Yoon Byung-hee as Dong-hyeon
- Kim Joo-hun as Kang Woo-il
- Lee Jung-eun as Eun-soo's mother

=== Special appearances ===
- Park Hoon as Gyeol-han
- Park Min-jung as Ma-ri
- Seo In-guk as Jay Jun
- Yoon Seo-ah as Kim Seo-yeon

== Original soundtrack ==
1. Released on December 30, 2021
No.	Title	Lyrics	Music	Artist	Length
1.	"Love beyond words" (사랑은 말로 표현하는게 아니래요)	Doko	Doko	Kyuhyun (Super Junior)	3:53
2.	"Love beyond words" (사랑은 말로 표현하는게 아니래요; Inst.)		Doko		3:53
Total length:					7:54

2. Released on January 6, 2022
No.	Title	Lyrics	Music	Artist	Length
1.	"Want to be happy" (행복해지고 싶어)	Lee Rae-eon; Park Bo-ram	Lee Rae-eon	Park Bo-ram	3:33
2.	"Want to be happy" (행복해지고 싶어; Inst.)		Lee Rae-eon		3:33
Total length:					7:06

3. Released on January 20, 2022
No.	Title	Lyrics	Music	Artist	Length
1.	"Your tender heart hurts me" (소녀 같은 맘을 가진 그댈 생각하면 아파요)	Doko	Doko	Davichi	3:40
2.	"Your tender heart hurts me" (소녀 같은 맘을 가진 그댈 생각하면 아파요; Inst.)		Doko		3:40
Total length:					7:20

4. Released on January 27, 2022
No.	Title	Lyrics	Music	Artist	Length
1.	"My Love"	Lee Yong-min; With; TLL; D-Won	Lee Yong-min	Kim Jong-kook	3:28
2.	"My Love" (Inst.)		Lee Yong-min		3:28
Total length:					6:56

5. Released on February 6, 2022
No.	Title	Lyrics	Music	Artist	Length
1.	"Talk to me" (나에게 말해요)	Bark; Jung Ki-chang; Kim Hyun-ah	Bark; Jung Ki-chang; Rosie K	Kim Jae-hwan	4:17
2.	"Talk to me" (나에게 말해요; Inst.)		Bark; Jung Ki-chang; Rosie K		4:17
Total length:					8:34

6. Released on February 14, 2022
No.	Title	Lyrics	Music	Artist	Length
1.	"Prettiest One" (너만 예뻐)	Kim Seong-tae; With	Kim Seong-tae	Standing Egg	3:08
2.	"Prettiest One" (너만 예뻐; Inst.)		Kim Seong-tae		3:08
Total length:					6:16

7. Released on February 22, 2022
No.	Title	Lyrics	Music	Artist	Length
1.	"A little more" (아주 조금만 더)	Lee Yong-min; Choi In-hwan; With; TLL; D-Won	Lee Yong-min; Choi In-hwan	Doyoung (NCT)	3:22
2.	"A little more" (아주 조금만 더; Inst.)		Lee Yong-min; Choi In-hwan		3:22
Total length:					6:44

8. Released on March 2, 2022
No.	Title	Lyrics	Music	Artist	Length
1.	"Wanna be your lover" (이젠 친구에서 연인이 되고 싶어)	Monday Kiz	Monday Kiz; Drei	Monday Kiz	4:26
2.	"Wanna be your lover" (이젠 친구에서 연인이 되고 싶어; Inst.)		Monday Kiz; Drei		4:26
Total length:					8:52

9. Released on March 14, 2022
No.	Title	Lyrics	Music	Artist	Length
1.	"We'll shine brighter than any other stars" (우린 어떠한 별보다 빛날 거야)	Doko; Lee Ki-hwan	Doko; Lee Ki-hwan	Lee Hi	3:49
2.	"We'll shine brighter than any other stars" (우린 어떠한 별보다 빛날 거야; Inst.)		Doko; Lee Ki-hwan		3:49
Total length:					7:38

10. Released on March 23, 2022
No.	Title	Lyrics	Music	Artist	Length
1.	"Love Love Love"	Lee Yong-min; With; TLL; D-Won	Lee Yong-min	Seobin	3:16
2.	"Love Love Love" (Inst.)		Lee Yong-min		3:16
Total length:					6:32

11. Released on March 29, 2022
No.	Title	Lyrics	Music	Artist	Length
1.	"miss you more, I'm sorry" (더 보고 싶고 미안하고 그래)	Seumusal	Seumusal	Lee Ye-joon	3:20
2.	"miss you more, I'm sorry" (더 보고 싶고 미안하고 그래; Inst.)		Seumusal		3:20
Total length:					6:40

12. Released on April 6, 2022
No.	Title	Lyrics	Music	Artist	Length
1.	"Love beyond words"	Doko; Gui-yoon	Doko	Doko	3:53
2.	"Love beyond words" (Inst.)		Doko		3:53
Total length:					7:46

13. Released on April 13, 2022
No.	Title	Lyrics	Music	Artist	Length
1.	"I'm more sorry and miss you" (더 미안하고 보고 싶고 그래)	Twenty	Twenty	Twenty	3:11
2.	"I'm more sorry and miss you" (더 미안하고 보고 싶고 그래; Inst.)		Twenty		3:11
Total length:					6:22

== Reception ==
=== Audience viewership ===
Soundtrack #1 was ranked first among the most-watched series on Disney+ in South Korea, Japan, Singapore, Hong Kong, and Taiwan, during the week of March 26, 2022.

=== Critical reception ===
Ayushi Agrawal of Pinkvilla found the series reassuring and homely, stating that while it does not bring something new, the show manages to be a convincing love story, and praised the performances of Park Hyung-sik and Han So-hee. Tanu I. Raj of New Musical Express rated the series 4 out of 5 stars and found it to be "one of the most sublime offerings of this summer." Raj called the relationship between the lead characters intimate, realistic, and sensitive, and praised the dialogues and the visuals, while complimenting the performances of the actors. Amit Adarsh states that "This series captures more emotions than 90% of the sixteen episodes romantic drama out there."
