= Demian (singer) =

South Korean singer and actor (born 1994)

- Born: Son Jeong-hyeok; March 12, 1994 (age 32); South Korea
- Education: Korea University
- Occupations: Singer-songwriter; actor
- Musical career
- Genre: K-pop
- Instrument: Vocals
- Years active: 2020–present
- Labels: MSTeam Entertainment; SME Korea
- Website: Official website

Korean name
- Hangul: 손정혁
- RR: Son Jeonghyeok
- MR: Son Chŏnghyŏk

Son Jeong-hyeok (Korean: 손정혁; born March 12, 1994), known professionally as Demian (데미안), is a South Korean singer, songwriter and actor. He made his music debut with the single "Cassette" in March 2020, and made his acting debut in 2023, playing the role of Kei in Soundtrack 2.

== Life and career ==
=== Pre-debut ===
Demian was born and raised in South Korea, and started singing in elementary school when he joined a singing quartet. In 2008 he studied abroad in Canada for middle school where he was introduced to alternative forms of music. What started as a hobby became a serious career choice while serving in the military as a university student at Korea University's Department of Business Administration when he was 22. He initially released music on SoundCloud before signing with Sony Music Entertainment Korea during his fourth year of university. His stage name is based on the 1919 book of the same name.

=== 2020—present: Success with debut single "Cassette" and acting ventures ===
Demian made his debut with the single "Cassette" in March 2020. The single topped the iTunes K-pop charts in 4 countries including South Africa, Luxembourg, and Italy and gained 2 million streams on Spotify within the first 5 months of its release. This success was followed with the release of the single "Karma" in June, which entered the Top 10 of the same charts in 8 countries. His third single "Yes" was released in August that same year. Demian then released his first and only single album A Blue not Blues in March 2021, with the title track "Love%" featuring Dawn, who he reached out to following the song's completion.

Demian made his first feature on the single "Room 201" by Steven in February 2022, then took a break from releasing music following the release of "Basement Boy" in May 2022, focusing on acting which he initially took lessons for to aid in producing music. He made his acting debut in the 2023 web series Soundtrack 2, where he played the role of Kei. Prior to this, his contract with his previous company had ended and he signed with MSTeam Entertainment. Demian plays the role of Jung Gi-jeon in the television series Absolute Value of Romance, which premiered in April 2026.

== Discography ==
=== Singles ===
==== As lead artist ====
List of singles as lead artist, showing year released, and album name
Title	Year	Album
"Cassette"	2020	Non-album singles
"Karma"	2020	Non-album singles
"Yes"	2020	Non-album singles
"Love%" (feat. Dawn)	2021	A Blue Not Blues
"Basement Boy"	2022	Non-album single

==== As featured artist ====
List of singles as featured artist, showing year released, and album name
Title	Year	Album
"Room 201" Steven (feat. Demian)	2022	A Youth in 1969

=== Soundtrack appearances ===
List of soundtrack appearances, showing year released, and album name
Title	Year	Album
"A Simple Man"	2023	Race OST
"Memory of Us"	2025	You Are the Apple of My Eye OST

=== Composition credits ===
All song credits are adapted from the Korea Music Copyright Association's database unless stated otherwise.

List of songs, showing year released, artist name, and name of the album
Title	Year	Artist	Album	Lyricist	Composer	Producer
"Cassette"	2020	Himself	Non-album singles	Yes	Yes	Yes
"Karma"	2020	Himself	Non-album singles	Yes	Yes	No
"Yes"	2020	Himself	Non-album singles	Yes	Yes	No
"Love" (feat. Dawn)	2021	Himself	A Blue not Blues	Yes	Yes	Yes
"One More Night"	2021	Himself	A Blue not Blues	Yes	Yes	No
"Room 201" (feat. Demian)	2022	Steven	A youth in 1969	Yes	Yes	No
"Basement Boy"	2022	Himself	Non-album single	Yes	Yes	No
"Meaning of Love" (사랑한다는 말의 뜻을 알아가자)	2024	NCT 127	Walk	Yes	Yes	No
"Born To Love You" (보다)	2025	Gyubin	Flowering	Yes	Yes	No
"Midnight Special"	2025	Fifty Fifty	Day & Night	Yes	No	No
"Love Will Find a Way" (나무가될게)	2025	Young K	Good Boy OST	Yes	No	No
"Love Chat"	2025	Evnne	Love Anecdote(s)	Yes	No	No
"Mako"	2025	Evnne	Love Anecdote(s)	Yes	No	No
"Summer Rain"	2025	Aimers	Full Count	Yes	Yes	No
"Truth & Dare" (비밀)	2025	Aimers	Full Count	No	Yes	No
"Scent"	2025	Xlov	Uxlxve	Yes	No	No
"Drip Drip"	2025	Xlov	Uxlxve	Yes	No	No
"Red (Beggin')"	2025	Verivery	Lost and Found	Yes	No	No
"Hard to Love" (사랑이어려운이유)	2026	Sondia	Positively Yours OST	Yes	No	No

== Filmography ==
=== Film ===
Year	Title	Role	Ref.
2025	You Are the Apple of My Eye	Ahn Sung-bin	

=== Television series ===
Year	Title	Role	Notes	Ref.
2023	Soundtrack 2	Kei		
2024	Bad Guy's Guide to Love	Seong Ji-hun		
2025	Love.exe	Park Chang	Guest	
2026	Absolute Value of Romance	Jung Gi-jeon		

=== Television shows ===
Year	Title	Role	Notes	Ref.
2021	Superband	Contestant	Season 2	
2022	Never a Dull Moment	Himself		
2022–23	Love Alarm Clap! Clap! Clap!	Himself		
