= You Are the Apple of My Eye (2024 film) =

2024 film by Cho Young-myoung

- Theatrical release poster
- Hangul: 그 시절, 우리가 좋아했던 소녀
- Lit.: The Girl We Liked Back Then
- RR: Geu sijeol, uriga joahaetdeon sonyeo
- MR: Kŭ sijŏl, uriga choahaettŏn sonyŏ
- Directed by: Cho Young-myoung
- Screenplay by: Cho Young-myoung
- Based on: The Girl We Chased Together in Those Years by Giddens Ko
- Produced by: Song Dae-chan
- Starring: Jinyoung; Dahyun
- Cinematography: Hong Jae-sik
- Edited by: Kim Man-guen
- Music by: Lee Jong-myoung (Ecobridge)
- Production companies: Studio Take; Jayuro Pictures
- Distributed by: CJ CGV/WYSIWYG Studios (South Korea); K-Movie Entertainment (international)
- Release dates: October 3, 2024 (BIFF); February 21, 2025 (South Korea)
- Country: South Korea
- Language: Korean
- Box office: US$1 million

You Are the Apple of My Eye (Korean: 그 시절, 우리가 좋아했던 소녀) is a 2024 South Korean coming-of-age romance film. It is based on the semi-autobiographical novel of the same name by Taiwanese author Giddens Ko. The film, the feature directorial debut of Cho Young-myoung, is a remake of the 2011 Taiwanese film of the same name. It follows immature Jin-woo (Jung Jin-young), who spent countless days before confessing to his first love Seon-ah (Dahyun) at the age of 18.

The film had its world premiere at the 29th Busan International Film Festival on October 3, 2024. It was released in theaters on February 21, 2025.

== Synopsis ==
Jin-woo and his friends each navigating the highs and lows of adolescence. However, they all share a fascination with Seon-ah, the graceful and beautiful model student who seems like an unattainable dream, despite being in the same class. Despite their different personalities and academic standings, Jin-woo and Seon-ah form a close bond by appreciating each other's unique qualities. Their relationship traverses challenging phases of high school.

== Cast ==
- Jung Jin-young as Goo Jin-woo
- Dahyun as Oh Seon-ah
- Son Jeong-hyuk as Ahn Sung-bin
- Kim Yo-han as Oh Dong-hyun
- Lee Min-goo as Byun Tae-wan
- Lee Seung-jun as Han Byeong-ju
- Kim Min-ju as Yoon Ji-soo
- Jo Dal-hwan as Teacher
- Park Sung-woong as Jin-woo's father
- Shin Eun-Jung as Jin-woo's mother
- Son Woo-hyeon as Seon-ah's groom

== Production ==
In May 2024, JYP Entertainment reported that Dahyun was cast as the female lead in the Korean remake of You Are the Apple of My Eye. They further reported, "We have received an offer for the work and are currently reviewing it." Jung Jin-young's agency Management Run also confirmed his appearance in the film.

After completing the casting, principal photography began in early June 2024.

== Original soundtrack ==
You Are the Apple of My Eye

Soundtrack album by Various
- Released: February 20, 2025
- Recorded: 2024
- Genre: Soundtrack
- Length: 8:19
- Languages: Korean; English
- Labels: Most Content; Studio Take
- Producer: Echo Bridge
Audio Albums
- You Are the Apple of My Eye OST Part.1 on YouTube
- You Are the Apple of My Eye OST Part.2 on YouTube

The album was released for pre-order on February 20, 2025.

=== Part 1 ===
Released on February 5, 2025
No.	Title	Lyrics	Music	Artist	Length
1.	"Now Do You"	Ancode	Lee Seon-haeng	Maudy Ayunda	4:06

=== Part 2 ===
Released on February 20, 2025
No.	Title	Lyrics	Music	Artist	Length
1.	"The Girl We Liked Back Then" (그 시절, 우리가 좋아했던 소녀)	Jinyoung, Dahyun, Jo Young-myeong	Jinyoung, Dahyun, Kang Myeong-shin	Jinyoung, Dahyun	4:13

== Release ==
You Are the Apple of My Eye premiered at the 29th Busan International Film Festival in Korean Cinema - Panorama section on October 3, 2024. It was released on February 21, 2025, in South Korea by CJ CGV and WYSIWYG Studios.

The film has been sold overseas in 8 countries including Indonesia, Singapore, Malaysia, Brazil and Thailand.

== Reception ==
The film was released on February 21, 2025 on 660 screens. The film opened with 25,695 cumulative audience on the first day of its release.

As of March 19, 2025, the film has grossed US$1,003,952 from 164,320 admissions at the South Korean box office.

=== Accolades ===
Award	Year	Category	Recipient(s)	Result	Ref.
Busan International Film Festival with Marie Claire Asia Star Awards	October 3, 2024	Rising Star Award	Dahyun	Won	
Golden Cinematography Awards	October 2, 2025	Best New Director Award	Cho Young-myoung	Won	
Seoul Global Movie Awards	December 10, 2025	Best New Actress	Dahyun	Won	
Chunsa Film Art Awards	December 23, 2025	New Star Award	Dahyun	Won	
