= Soundtrack 2 =

2023 South Korean web series

Soundtrack #2
- Promotional poster
- Also known as: Soundtrack No. 2
- Hangul: 사운드트랙 #2
- RR: Saundeuteuraek #2
- MR: Saundŭt'ŭraek #2
- Genre: Romance; Music
- Written by: Jung Hye-seung
- Directed by: Choi Jung-kyu; Kim Hee-won
- Starring: Noh Sang-hyun; Keum Sae-rok; Son Jeong-hyuk
- Country of origin: South Korea
- Original language: Korean
- No. of episodes: 6

Production
- Running time: 40 minutes
- Production companies: Red Nine Pictures; Xanadu Entertainment

Original release
- Network: Disney+
- Release: December 6 – December 20, 2023

Related
- Soundtrack #1

Soundtrack #2 (Korean: 사운드트랙 #2) is a South Korean television series written by Jung Hye-seung, and directed by Choi Jung-kyu and Kim Hee-won. It is produced by Red Nine Pictures and Xanadu Entertainment, and starring Noh Sang-hyun, Keum Sae-rok and Son Jeong-hyuk. It aired on Disney+ from December 6 to 20, 2023, in selected territories.

The series is a standalone sequel to the 2022 series Soundtrack #1.

== Cast ==
- Noh Sang-hyun as Ji Su-ho
- Keum Sae-rok as Do Hyun-seo
- Son Jeong-hyuk as Kei
- Park Bo-kyung as Kim Soo-min
- Kwon Seung-woo as Chang-sik
- Jeon Hye-jin as Kim Jin-kyeong

== Production ==
The series was announced by Disney+ consisting of six episodes. The principal photography of the series commenced in 2023, with Noh Sang-hyun and Keum Sae-rok joining the cast. The teaser and trailer for the series were released in November 2023.

== Episodes ==
Episode #	Summary
1	Piano teacher Do Hyunseo struggles to retain clients and does side hustles of delivery and line sitting to make ends meet. She delivers to a student of her old music academy, where she had excelled at piano in her time as a student there. During the conversation with the student and her best friend Jinkyeong, it is revealed that Hyunseo is thinking of closing her piano business to open a tteokbokki shop, since piano is not working out well for her. Ji Suho, CEO of Playing, Inc. an online talent and creator management company is ordered by his doctor and COO Hong Changsik to rest for a month after he collapsed due to tinnitus from overwork and stress. Changsik orders him to stay home and take piano lessons as part of his recovery. Changsik hires Hyunseo as the piano teacher, with neither Suho or Hyunseo knowing about each other's identities. Bored at home because Changsik took away his computer, Suho scrolls TikTok and comes across a promising musician named K and reaches out to work together. When Hyunseo arrives at Suho's house for the lesson, both of them are taken aback and Hyunseo storms out. It is then revealed that Suho and Hyunseo were in a relationship four years ago, but broke up when Hyunseo stood up Suho at the airport when they were about to leave for the Camino Santiago Trail. Suho follows her and convinces her to continue to teach him.
2	Suho revisits the breakup with Hyunseo, and expresses he hated her and wished she would suffer as much he did. In the morning, he sets up a meeting with K to discuss working together on a song. While preparing for her piano lessons with Suho, she comes across some old music books and reminisces about her past relationship with him; she taught him how to play years ago. When she shows up for the lesson, there are strong undertones of Suho flaunting his wealth and accomplishments to Hyunseo. He displays all his awards and trophies and drives her home in his Lamborghini. When Hyunseo arrives home, she accepts a line sitting job. In a flashback, Suho was not rich and successful when he was dating Hyunseo; she was actually the one who was supposed to be successful since she was the top student at the music academy. However, she doesn't think Suho has any ambition because he is just focused on making slime videos for YouTube, and they fight over this. Hyunseo meets K at her line sitting job, who is also line sitting. They bond over their love of music and start composing a song together. When Hyunseo shows up to Suho's house for the next lesson, she runs into K, who has agreed to work with Suho.
3	At Suho's house, K and Hyunseo start working on a song together, and Suho appears to get jealous. Later that evening, K praises her piano talent and formally asks her to join him on the project. Suho's jealousy leads him to show up to Hyunseo's place to sign the contract to work on K's song. He is visibly upset and interrogates Hyunseo about her feelings for K, but she rebuffs him. Now that the three of them are working together, Jinkyeong warns Hyunseo not to revisit her past relationship with Suho and to take note of her developing friendship with K, hoping it might turn romantic. As K and Hyunseo move into Suho's house to work on the project, Suho attempts to get between Hyunseo and K getting closer, and the two of them think Suho's behavior is strange. Another flashback shows Hyunseo getting home after a long day only to find Suho had spent the entire day on YouTube analyzing YouTubers and trends and did nothing around the house. That night in the present, Hyunseo takes a walk to clear her mind, but Suho follows. They confront each other about how Hyunseo hated Suho's dream to be a YouTuber in the past and Suho loves to rub it in her face that YouTube had made him rich and successful.
4	Changsik shows up with next morning to check up on Suho, and is angry to find out he has been working after all behind his back. Changsik knows about Suho's past with Hyunseo and is even more annoyed thinking they have rekindled their relationship. Hyunseo, Suho, and K go to a record store, where Suho's jealousy triggers his tinnitus, causing him to collapse. He is pleased to find out Hyunseo was worried about him collapsing. Jinkyeong reminds Hyunseo that no good came come from rekindling the romance with Suho. The next day, K, Hyunseo, and Suho go out around Seoul to scout for locations for their music video. K reveals his feelings to Hyunseo and asks her to think about her feelings for him. That night, Hyunseo moves out since the song is finished, and Changsik and Suho decide to take Hyunseo out to Jinkyeong's bar to celebrate. The four of them have a great time and Changsik starts flirting with Jinkyeong. Hyunseo decides to go home for the night and Suho walks her home. It starts raining, so Hyunseo invites him in. The start drinking again and end up playing the piano together again and share a kiss.
5	Hyunseo and Suho wake up in bed together, seemingly with no regrets. Jinkyeong and Changsik come over early and discovers Suho's phone and wallet, telling them that he spent the night with Hyunseo. K and Hyunseo record the song and go out to dinner that night. After dinner, K thanks Suho for everything and tells him he is preparing to go back to the US. That night, Suho and Hyunseo fall asleep on the phone to each other. The next day the crew film the music video for K's song, and everyone celebrates afterwards except for K, who had to go to work. That night, as Suho is reviewing the raw footage from the music video shoot, he discovers a hot mic and learn that K had told Hyunseo his feelings for her, but she does not reciprocate, which Suho celebrates. The next day at their piano lesson, Suho confesses that he heard the conversation between her and K and asks what he is to her. She confesses that she's terrified of her feelings for him and they share a kiss again.
6	The episode begins with Hyunseo and Suho reminiscing about their rekindled relationship, but it is bittersweet as they have broken up again and deleted their photos of each other. Hyunseo is also renovating her place for the tteokbokki restaurant, but runs into budget issues. K's song is starting to do well and asks Hyunseo to go out to celebrate, which she does but has to leave early for a line-sitting job. Suho is annoyed by this, since Hyunseo can't borrow money from him because she can't be indebted to anyone. Hyunseo finds out Suho had paid her rent for a full year, and she's miffed that Suho didn't ask her first, since she has pride about taking charity. They decide to take a break from their relationship. K call's Hyunseo to catch up, and reveals that his song was inspired by Hyunseo and Suho's love story. Hyunseo learns that she never loved herself and doesn't feel like she could be in a relationship until she works on herself. She breaks up with Suho and plans to hike the Camino Santiago herself. She runs into Suho at the airport, and they decide to take the trip together.

== Reception ==
Arshi Khanam of OTTPlay rated the series 2.5/5 stars. Carmen Chin of NME rated the series 3 out of 5 stars in her review.
