= Run to You (film) =

2025 film by Lee Seung-hoon

- Theatrical release poster
- Hangul: 전력질주
- RR: Jeollyeok jilju
- MR: Chŏllyŏk chilchu
- Directed by: Lee Seung-hoon
- Written by: Lee Seung-hoon
- Produced by: An Hee-jin; Yu Sung-kwon
- Starring: Ha Seok-jin; Lee Shin-young; Dahyun
- Music by: Koo Bon-chun
- Production company: Heyday Production
- Distributed by: 300 & Co.; Redice Entertainment
- Release date: September 10, 2025
- Running time: 93 minutes
- Country: South Korea
- Language: Korean
- Box office: $105,593

Run to You (Korean: 전력질주) is a 2025 South Korean romantic sports drama film written and directed by Lee Seung-hoon in his feature debut. Starring Ha Seok-jin, Lee Shin-young and Dahyun, the film is inspired by the real-life Korean men's 100M record of Kim Kuk-young, which has remained unbroken since 2017.

Produced by Korea’s Heyday Production, the film follows an experienced runner who gets one final chance to win back the woman he loves, and a cheerful high school boy who does everything he can to make Ji Eun fall for him.

It was released theatrically on September 10, 2025 in South Korea.

== Cast ==
- Ha Seok-jin as Kang Goo-yeong
- Lee Shin-young as Kang Seung-yeol
- Dahyun as Ji-eun
- Lee Soon-won
- Yoon Seo-bin as Jang Geun Jae

== Production ==
In October 2024, Yoon Seo-bin joined the cast of the film.

From October 5 to 8, 2024, the in-production film was presented at the Asian Contents & Film Market (ACFM), a Hub for the Future of Asian Content, which is held in Busan, South Korea, in conjunction with the Busan International Film Festival.

== Release ==
Run to You was released in South Korean theaters on September 10, 2025 at Lotte Cinema.

Los Angeles-based sales company Myriad Pictures acquired the international rights of the film in October 2024.

== Reception ==
=== Box office ===
The film was released on September 10, 2025 on 168 screens.

As of October 3, 2025, the film has grossed US$105,456 from 17,487 admissions.
