= List of JKT48 members =

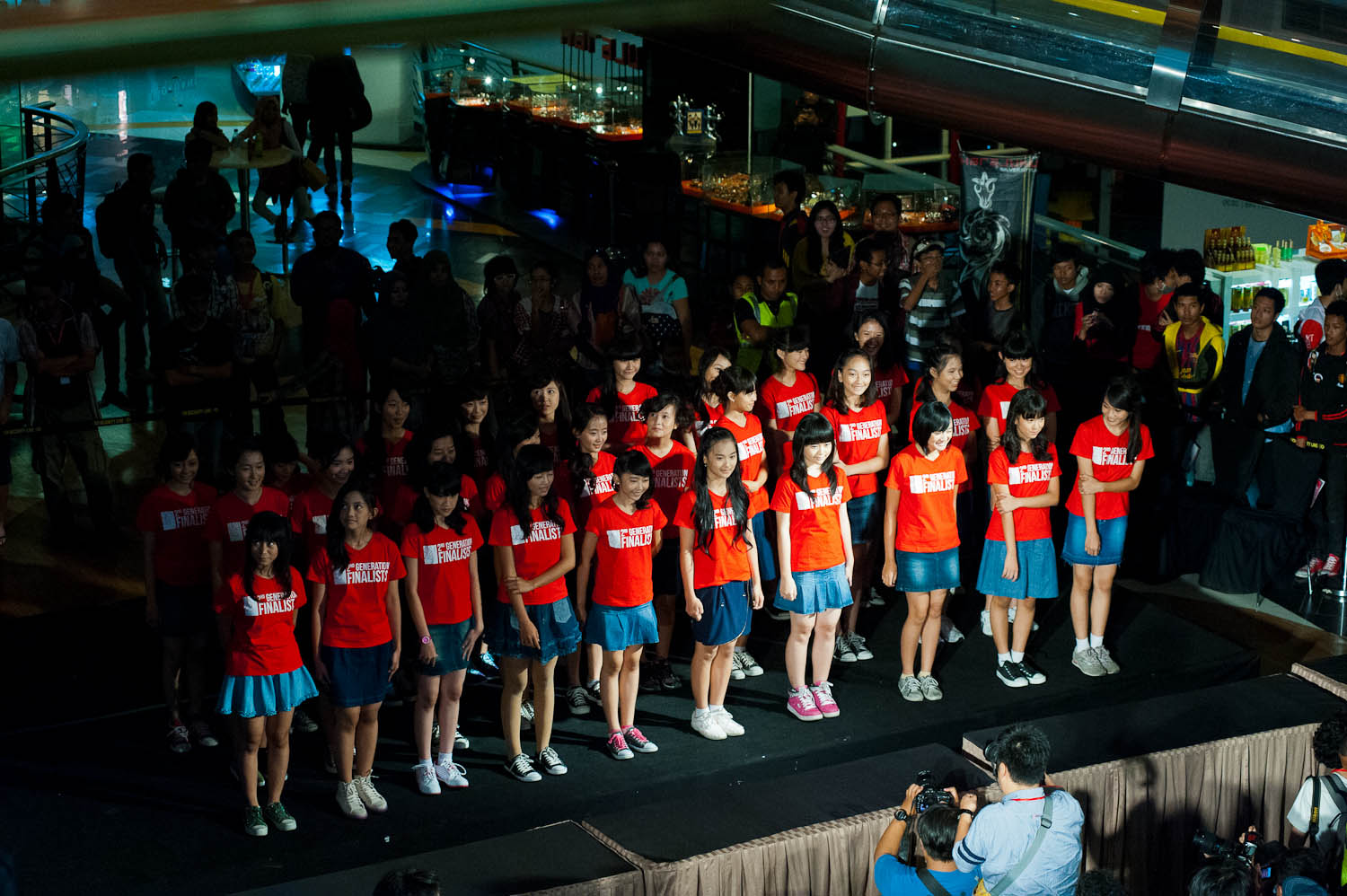
JKT48's second generation members (then still audition finalists) were introduced on 14 October 2012 at fX Sudirman, Central Jakarta, Jakarta.

JKT48 is an Indonesian girl group formed in 2011 as a sister group of the Japanese idol group AKB48. Since 2021, members are selected through auditions in Jakarta, Indonesia. Among the members are Trainees who serve as understudies for the main members. Those who leave the group on amiable terms are considered "graduates" and given a last theater show, sometimes accompanied with either a special graduation show or concert.

On 11 January 2021, it was announced that the group would forcibly mass-graduate 26 of its members as it was hit by a crisis caused by the COVID-19 pandemic and government-imposed large-scale social restrictions. They officially left the group in mid-March 2021.

Most of the group's members are Indonesians, however there have been some Japanese in the group, as well as a Malaysian and an Australian. Non-Indonesian members are denoted with a flag before their name. As of 7 September 2026, the group individually consists of 58 members.

== Overview ==
As of 7 September 2026, the group individually consists of 58 members: 40 regular members, eight trainees from the 13th generation, and 10 trainees from the 14th generation. From the regular members, 15 are in Team Passion, 13 are in Team Love, and the other 12 are assigned in Team Dream.

== Current members and their election record ==
=== Team members ===
Between 2 November 2011 and 23 December 2012 and later from 15 March 2021 to 31 March 2026, no teams existed within the group. In between, members were grouped into three teams. The teams were:

- Team J, identified with the color red. It existed continuously from 23 December 2012 to 14 March 2021.
- Team KIII, identified with the color yellow and blue. It existed continuously from 25 June 2013 to 13 March 2021.
- Team T, identified with the color magenta. It existed continuously from 24 January 2015 to 31 December 2019. This team was initially inactive until 31 May 2020, but due to the COVID-19 pandemic in Indonesia which postponed the announcement event (originally planned on 28 March 2020), the team's reestablishment was postponed as well. The announcement of the team's members was eventually held in parts and broadcast live on the group's YouTube channel every evening from 26 May to 4 June 2020. Those who were selected would have officially enter the team on 1 August 2020, subject to the pandemic's development. However, due to the increasing number of COVID-19 cases, the official reestablishment was pushed further into the month; the team officially resumed its activities on 22 August. The team was disbanded again after its last show on 12 March 2021.

There were also an Academy, which replaced the term of Research Students or Trainees (Japanese: 研究生, Hepburn: Kenkyūsei) since 8 April 2018. The academy—existed between 15 April 2018 and 11 March 2021—was divided into two classes, Class A and Class B.

On 20 December 2025, it was announced that the three-team system would return, but the teams were renamed to "Love", "Dream", and "Passion". The system commenced on 1 April 2026.

Name outside "( )" are those listed in the member's personal profile on JKT48 website.

Key
(c)	Indicates group captain
(c)	Indicates team captain
(vc)	Indicates team vice-captain
	Indicates a member who did not participate in the year's JKT48 General Election since she was yet to become a JKT48 member or was barred from participation (as Class B Academy member or any other reason)
nr	Indicates a member who was unranked in the year's JKT48 General Election
dnp	Indicates an active member who did not participate in the year's JKT48 General Election

==== Team Love ====
Name	Birth date	Election rank							Notes
Name	Birth date	2014 rank	2015 rank	2016 rank	2017 rank	2018 rank	2019 rank	2024 rank	Notes
Anindya Ramadhani (Purnomo)	18 October 2005 (age 21)							nr	
Aurellia	29 October 2002 (age 23)							10	
Aurhel Alana (Tirta)	14 September 2006 (age 20)							15	
Celline Thefani (sic; Thefannie)	9 April 2007 (age 19)							nr	
Cynthia Yaputera	22 November 2003 (age 22)							nr	
Fiony Alveria (Tantri)	4 February 2002 (age 24)						nr	4	
Fritzy Rosmerian	28 July 2008 (age 18)							nr	
Grace Octaviani (Tanujaya)	18 October 2007 (age 19)							17	
(United States) Hillary Abigail (Mantiri)	19 October 2007 (age 19)							nr	
Indah Cahya (Nabilla)	20 March 2001 (age 25)							13	Announced graduation on 9 October 2026.
Jazzlyn (Agatha) Trisha (Indra Putri)	16 February 2011 (age 15)							nr	Youngest team member.
Michelle Alexandra (Suandi)	22 April 2009 (age 17)							nr	
(Japan) Nayla Suji (Aurelia Araki)	18 June 2007 (age 19)							nr	

==== Team Dream ====
Name	Birth date	Election rank							Notes
Name	Birth date	2014 rank	2015 rank	2016 rank	2017 rank	2018 rank	2019 rank	2024 rank	Notes
Adeline Wijaya	1 September 2007 (age 19)							24	
Febriola Sinambela	26 February 2005 (age 21)						nr	14	
(Raden Rara) Freya(nashifa) Jayawardana (c)	13 February 2006 (age 20)						nr	6	
Gabriela Abigail (Mewengkang)	7 August 2006 (age 20)							23	
Gita Sekar Andarini	30 June 2001 (age 25)					nr	nr	7	
Greesella (Sophina) Adhalia	10 January 2006 (age 20)							21	
Helisma (Mauludzunia) Putri (Kurnia)	15 June 2000 (age 26)					nr	15	22	
Jesslyn (Septiani) Elly	13 September 2001 (age 25)							nr	
Marsha Lenathea (Lapian)	9 January 2006 (age 20)							9	
Nina Tutachia (Browning Chapman)	16 October 2009 (age 17)							nr	Announced graduation on 4 October 2026.
Oline Manuel (Chay)	3 November 2007 (age 18)							nr	
Sha(h)bilqis Naila (Bustomi)	1 September 2008 (age 18)							nr	

==== Team Passion ====
Name	Birth date	Election rank							Notes
Name	Birth date	2014 rank	2015 rank	2016 rank	2017 rank	2018 rank	2019 rank	2024 rank	Notes
Abigail Rachel (Lie)	6 August 2008 (age 18)							nr	
Angelina Christy	5 December 2005 (age 20)					nr	13	2	
Catherina Vallencia (Kurniawan)	21 August 2007 (age 19)							18	
Cornelia (Syafa) Vanisa	26 July 2002 (age 24)						nr	12	
Dena Natalia (Ang)	16 December 2005 (age 20)							nr	First twins to enter the group.
Desy Natalia (Ang)	16 December 2005 (age 20)							nr	First twins to enter the group.
Feni Fitriyanti	16 January 1999 (age 27)	nr	nr	nr	nr	4	2	1	Oldest member in the group.
Jessica (Rich) Chandra	23 September 2005 (age 21)						nr	3	
Kathrina Irene (Indarto Putri)	26 July 2006 (age 20)							19	
Lulu (Azkiya) Salsabila	23 October 2002 (age 24)						nr	11	
Michelle Levia (Arifin)	24 January 2009 (age 17)							nr	
Mutiara Azzahra (Umandana)	12 July 2004 (age 22)					nr	nr	5	
Raisha Syifa (Wardhana)	11 November 2007 (age 18)							nr	
Ribka Budiman	13 January 2009 (age 17)							nr	
Victoria Kimberly (Lukitama)	8 March 2010 (age 16)							nr	

=== Trainees ===
The current trainees are nine members from the 13th generation and ten from the 14th generation.

Name	Birth date	Election rank							Notes
Name	Birth date	2014 rank	2015 rank	2016 rank	2017 rank	2018 rank	2019 rank	2024 rank	Notes
Afera Thalia (Putri Eysteinn)	20 October 2012 (age 14)								Fourteenth generation member. Youngest member in the group.
Astrella Virgiananda (Nugraha)	6 August 2010 (age 16)								Thirteenth generation member. Due to be promoted to Team Love.
Bong Aprilli (Paskah)	1 April 2010 (age 16)								Thirteenth generation member. Due to be promoted to Team Dream.
Carissa Dini (Asmaranti)	2 February 2012 (age 14)								Fourteenth generation member.
Christabella Bonita (Claura Chandra)	2 March 2011 (age 15)								Fourteenth generation member.
Fahira Putri (Kirana)	13 August 2012 (age 14)								Fourteenth generation member.
Fatimah Azzahra	30 August 2010 (age 16)								Fourteenth generation member.
Hagia Sopia	1 July 2008 (age 18)								Thirteenth generation member. Due to be promoted to Team Dream.
Heidi Suyangga	27 August 2008 (age 18)								Fourteenth generation member.
Humaira Ramadhani (Salfiandi)	13 August 2011 (age 15)								Thirteenth generation member. Due to be promoted to Team Love.
Jacqueline Immanuela (Jonathan)	9 July 2009 (age 17)								Thirteenth generation member. Due to be promoted to Team Love.
Jemima Evodie (Mayra Lijaya)	9 November 2009 (age 16)								Thirteenth generation member. Due to be promoted to Team Passion.
Maxine Faye Lee	2 December 2011 (age 14)								Fourteenth generation member.
Mikaela Kusjanto	15 December 2007 (age 18)								Thirteenth generation member. Due to be promoted to Team Dream.
Nur Intan	24 February 2006 (age 20)								Thirteenth generation member. Due to be promoted to Team Dream.
Putry Jazyta	12 March 2011 (age 15)								Fourteenth generation member.
Ralyne Van Irwan	15 October 2011 (age 15)								Fourteenth generation member.
Sona Kalyana (Purboprasetyani)	1 December 2011 (age 14)								Fourteenth generation member.

== Election rank of former members ==
These tables only include members who participated at least once during their tenure in the group.

Name outside "( )" or inside "{ }" are those listed on the member's personal profile on JKT48 website.

Key
	Indicates a member who did not participate in the year's JKT48 General Election since she was yet to become JKT48 member
nr	Indicates a member who did not rank in the year's JKT48 General Election
dnp	Indicates a still-active member who did not participate in the year's JKT48 General Election
do	Indicates a member who was dropped from candidacy from the year's JKT48 General Election midway through

Still active during the 2014 election process
Name	2014 rank
Anggie Putri Kurniasari	nr
Kezia Putri Andinta	nr
Milenia Christien Glory Goenawan	nr
Noella Sisterina	nr
Rica Leyona	7
Rizka Khalila	nr
Shaffa [sic; Shafa] Nabila (Kaleb)	nr
Zebi Magnolia Fawwaz	nr

Still active during the 2015 election process
Name	2014 rank	2015 rank
Alycia Ferryana (Mamahit)	nr	nr
Andela Yuwono	nr	4
Delima Rizky	nr	nr
Farina Yogi Devani	nr	nr
Indah Permata Sari	nr	nr
Nina Hamidah	nr	nr
Novinta Dhini (Soetopo)	nr	nr
Putri Farin Kartika	nr	nr
Thalia	13	22
Triarona Kusuma	nr	nr

Still active during the 2016 election process
Name	2014 rank	2015 rank	2016 rank
Chikita Ravenska Mamesah	nr	nr	dnp
Elaine Hartanto	nr	17	dnp
Ghaida Farisya	9	13	2
(Japan) Haruka Nakagawa	3	2	3
Jennifer Hanna (Sutiono)	15	23	nr
Martha Graciela	nr	nr	dnp
Nadhifa Salsabila	nr	nr	32
Rezky Wiranti Dhike	nr	30	nr
Sendy Ariani	nr	15	25
Sofia Meifaliani	nr	nr	dnp
Yansen Indiani	nr	nr	nr

Still active during the 2017 election process
Name	2014 rank	2015 rank	2016 rank	2017 rank
Amanda Dwi Arista	nr	nr	nr	nr
Christi [sic; Christy Chriselle]			nr	nr
Citra Ayu Pranajaya Wibrado				nr
Dena Siti Rohyati	nr	nr	14	31
Devi Kinal Putri	8	5	10	15
Elizabeth Gloria Setiawan				nr
Fakhriyani (Harrya) Shafariyanti	nr	nr	nr	28
Jessica Vania (Widjaja)	16	26	31	dnp
Jessica Veranda (Tanumihardja)	2	1	1	dnp
Melody Nurramdhani Laksani	1	3	5	3
Nabilah Ratna Ayu Azalia	6	10	8	16
Priscillia Sari Dewi	nr	8	7	nr
Regina Angelina				nr
(Japan) Rina Chikano		18	9	6
Ruth Damayanti Sitanggang				nr
Sri Lintang (Wulan Lisdiyanti)			nr	nr
Violeta {Burhan}				19
Zahra Yuriva Dermawan			nr	nr

Still active during the 2018 election process
Name	2014 rank	2015 rank	2016 rank	2017 rank	2018 rank
Dwi Putri Bonita	nr	28	15	nr	dnp
Lidya Maulida Djuhandar	nr	31	nr	30	dnp
Putri Cahyaning Anggraini					do
Amanda Priscella (Solichin)					nr
Made Devi Ranita Ningtara			nr	7	dnp
Riskha Fairunissa	nr	11	21	nr	dnp
Shinta Naomi	nr	24	23	nr	dnp
Erika Sintia					nr
Erika Ebisawa Kuswan					nr
Della Delila	nr	nr	28	27	nr
Saktia Oktapyani	nr	nr	18	9	nr
Ayu Safira Oktaviani	nr	nr	nr	17	6
Shania Junianatha	4	6	6	8	25
Graciella Ruth Wiranto					nr
Natalia	nr	nr	24	nr	28
Cindy Yuvia	12	9	4	5	1
Alicia Chanzia [sic; Chensia] (Ayu Kumaseh)	nr	nr	nr	29	nr
Rifa Fatmasari					nr

Still active during the 2019 election process and left before March 2021
Name	2014 rank	2015 rank	2016 rank	2017 rank	2018 rank	2019 rank
Stephanie Pricilla Indarto Putri	nr	nr	nr	nr	7	dnp
Sinka Juliani	nr	27	17	nr	3	dnp
Hasyakyla Utami Kusumawardhani				nr	nr	dnp
Adhisty Zara (Sundari Kusumawardhani)				23	32	dnp
Thalia Ivanka Elizabeth (Frederik)	nr	nr	16	nr	17	dnp
Sonia Natalia (Winarto)	nr	nr	nr	nr	26	dnp
(Japan) Ayana Shahab	14	14	19	2	10	dnp
Syahfira Angela Nurhaliza	nr	nr	nr	32	nr	dnp
Viviyona Apriani	10	25	30	24	12	dnp
Reva Adriana (Ramadhani)						nr
Jennifer Rachel Natasya (Nalenan)	nr	nr	nr	nr	nr	dnp
Michelle Christo Kusnadi	nr	20	12	13	15	dnp
Pamela Krysanthe (Adidjaya)						nr
Ratu Vienny Fitrilya	11	7	29	22	9	dnp
Devytha Maharani (Putri)						nr
Eriena Kartika (Dewi)						nr
Puti Nadhira Azalia				nr	nr	23
Aiko Harumi (Nangin)						nr
Salma Annisa						nr
Shalza Grasita					nr	nr
Melati Putri Rahel Sesilia			nr	25	20	11
Nyimas Ratu Rafa (Futuhni Kamil)						nr
Gabryela Marcelina (Djaja)				nr	16	6
Ni Made Ayu Vania Aurellia	nr	nr	27	nr	nr	24
Maria Genoveva Natalia Desy; Purnamasari Gunawan	nr	29	nr	21	18	17
Nadila Cindi Wantari	nr	nr	20	nr	23	5
Rona (Ariesta) Anggreani	nr	21	nr	11	21	18
Frieska [sic; Frizka] Anastasia Laksani	nr	19	nr	12	31	20
Beby Chaesara Anadila [sic; Anadilla]	5	12	22	14	11	8

Still active during the 2019 election process and left in or after March 2021
Name	2014 rank	2015 rank	2016 rank	2017 rank	2018 rank	2019 rank
Cindy Nugroho						nr
Febi [sic; Feby] Komaril					nr	27
Febrina Diponegoro						nr
Gabriella Stevany (Loide Lenggana Harahap)						nr
Keisya Ramadhani						nr
Aurel Mayori (Putri)					nr	31
Umega Maulana (Sinambela)						nr
Viona Fadrin					nr	16
Anastasya Narwastu Tety Handuran					nr	nr
Fidly Immanda Azzahra			nr	nr	24	28
Kandiya Rafa Maulidita					nr	nr
Nurhayati				26	5	4
Rinanda Syahputri					nr	32
Adriani Elisabeth			nr	nr	nr	nr
Amanina Afiqah (Ibrahim)						nr
Diani Amalia Ramadhani				nr	nr	14
Gabriel Angelina (Laeman)					nr	nr
Nabila (Yussi) Fitriana					nr	25
Riska Amelia Putri					nr	3
Sania Julia Montolalu				nr	nr	19
Zahra Nur (Khaulah)						nr
Amirah Fatin (Yasin)						nr
Ariella Calista Ichwan					nr	29
Eve Antoinette Ichwan				nr	19	nr
Aninditha Rahma Cahyadi	nr	nr	nr	10	13	21
Cindy Hapsari Maharani Pujiantoro Putri			nr	20	27	7
(Malaysia) Tan Zhi Hui Celine			nr	18	22	9
Gabriela Margareth [sic; Margaret] Warouw	nr	16	13	nr	29	22
Dhea Angelia					nr	26
Jinan Safa Safira			nr	nr	14	12
Jesslyn Callista						nr
Fransisca Saraswati Puspa Dewi	nr	nr	nr	nr	30	nr
Yessica Tamara					nr	30
Shani Indira Natio	nr	32	26	1	2	1
Azizi (Shafaa) Asadel					nr	nr

Still active during the 2024 election process
Name	2014 rank	2015 rank	2016 rank	2017 rank	2018 rank	2019 rank	2024 rank
Reva Fidela (Adel Pantjoro)						nr	dnp
Callista Alifia (Wardhana)							nr
Flora Shafiq(a Riyadi)						nr	nr
Letycia Moreen (Praditya)							nr
Regina Wilian (Hapsari)							nr
Indira (Putri) Seruni							16
Shania Gracia	nr	nr	11	4	8	10	8
Amanda (Puspita) Sukma (Mulyadewi)							nr
(Australia) Chelsea Davina (Norman)							nr
Gendis Mayrannisa (Setiawan)							nr
Cathleen Nixie (Yap)							20
Alya Amanda (Fatihah)							nr

== Members by generation ==
Here are all those who has ever been a JKT48 member. They are divided by "generation", or recruitment batch. Names listed below are written in registered form only, except for those whose names were not listed in above sections or those who have their names added on.

=== First generation ===
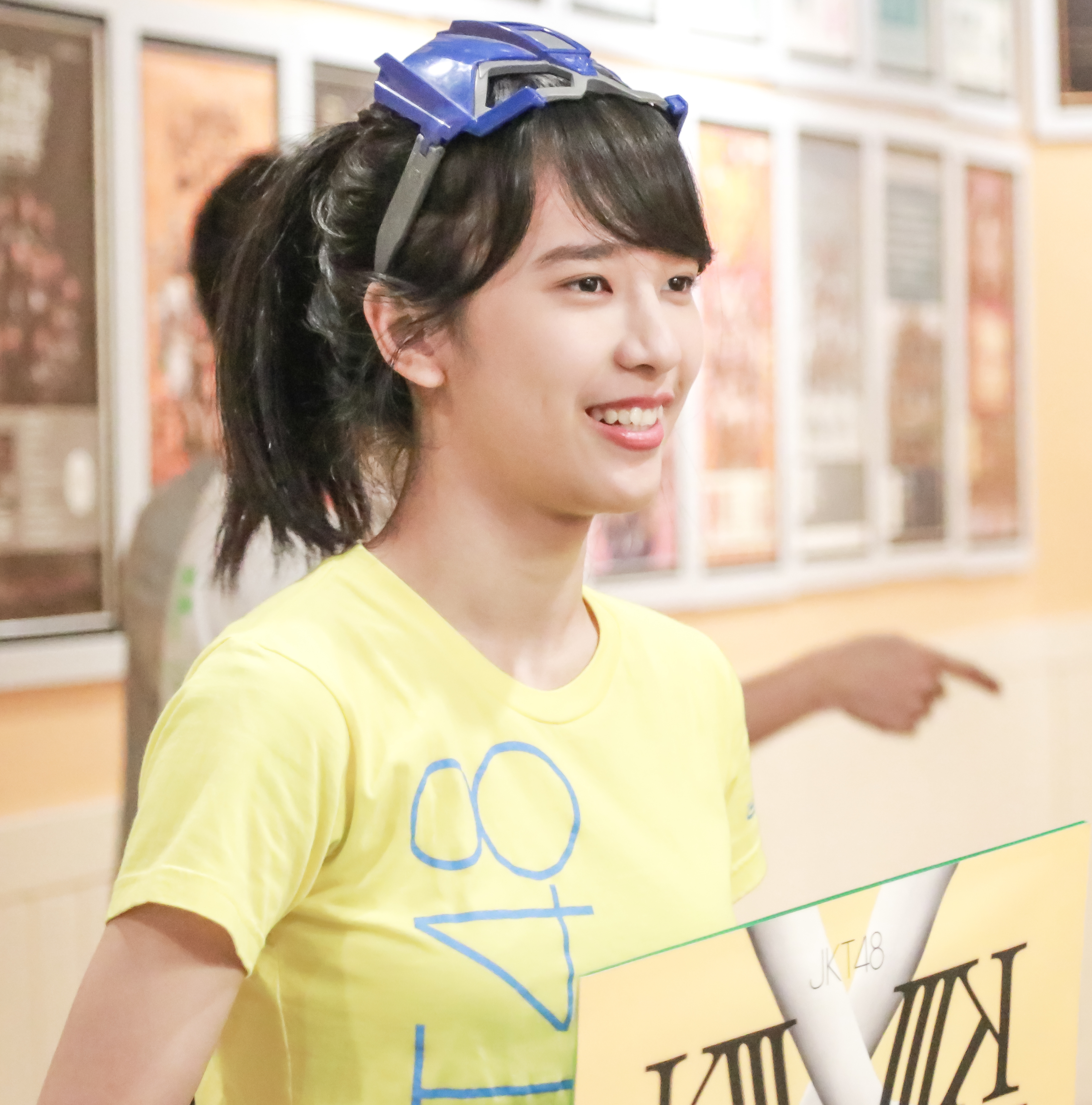
Beby C. Anadilla, the only member to be always ranked in the first six JKT48 single's members elections.

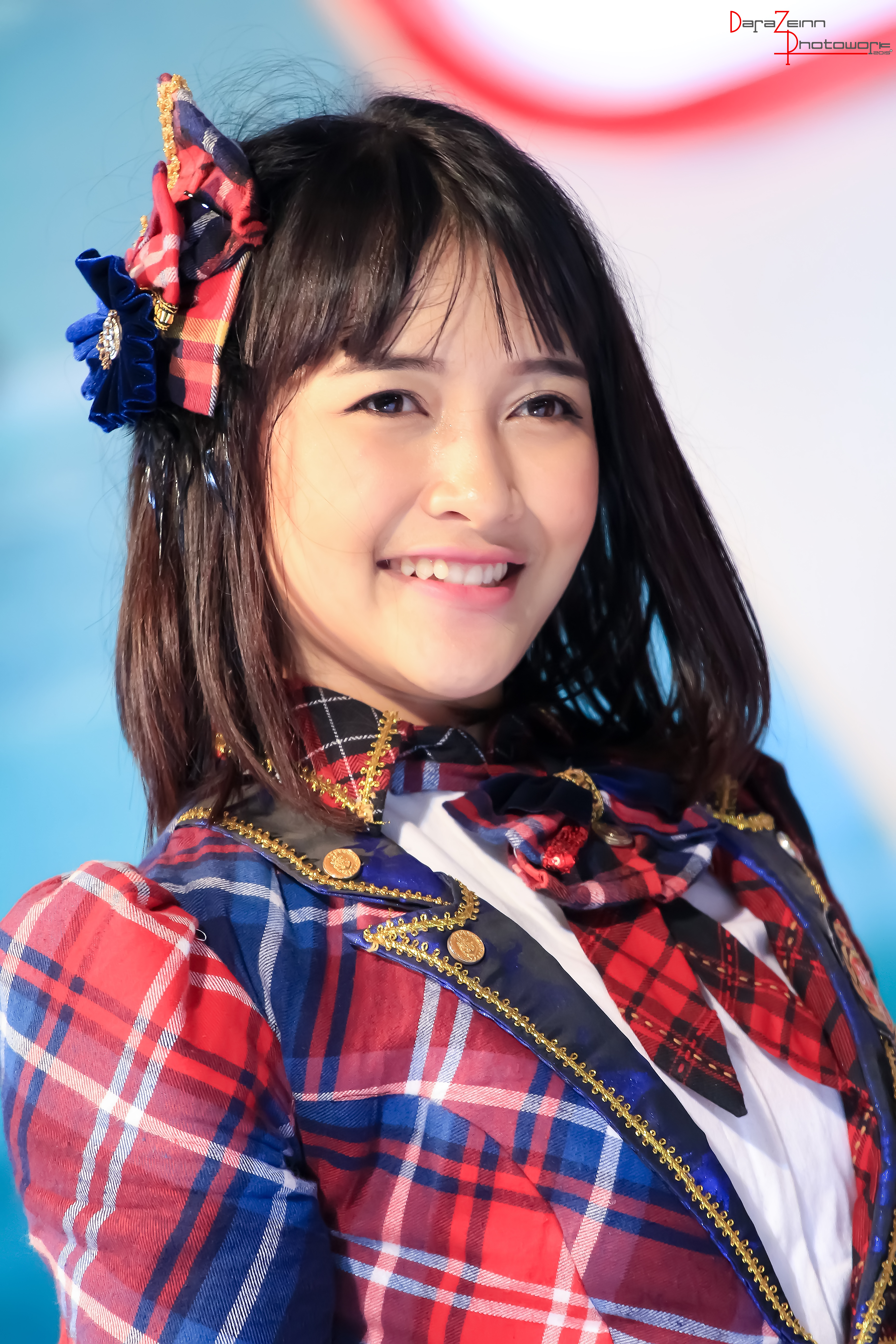
Devi Kinal Putri, member with the most consecutive single appearances (3rd–18th singles, 2013–2018)

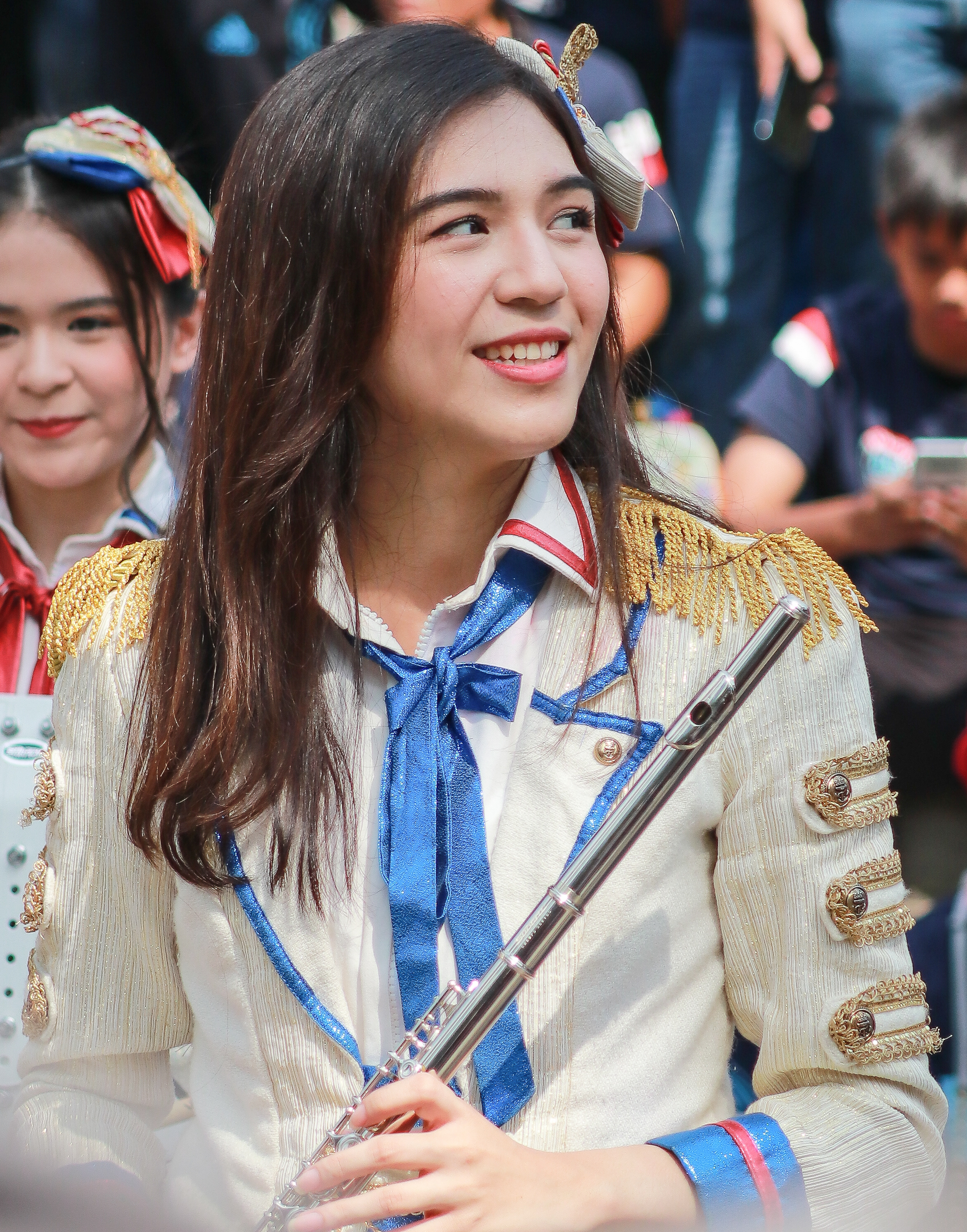
Gabriela Warouw, record holder for longest uninterrupted single team membership (8 years, 2 months and 19 days in Team J) and the group's last pre-2014 member.

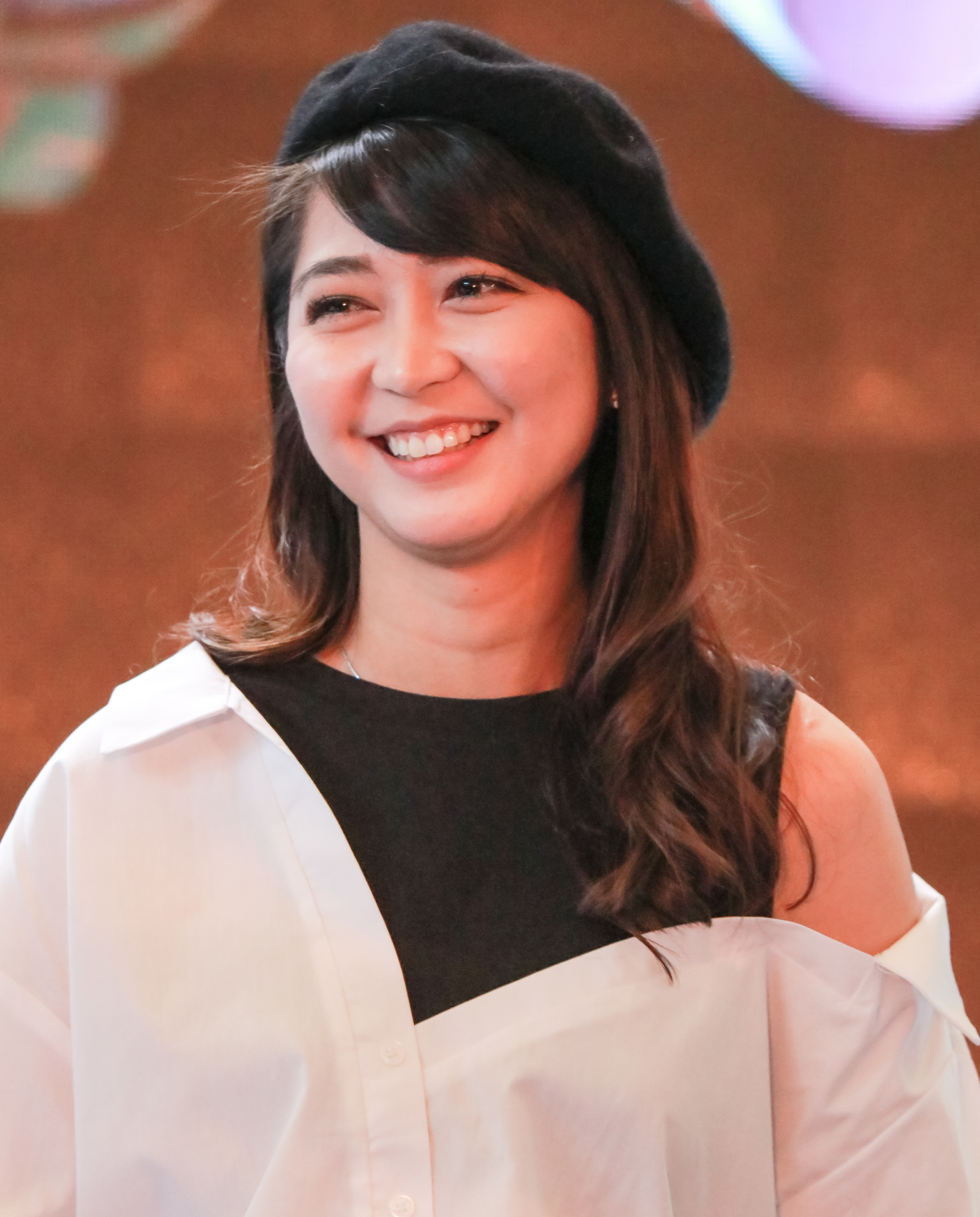
Jessica Veranda

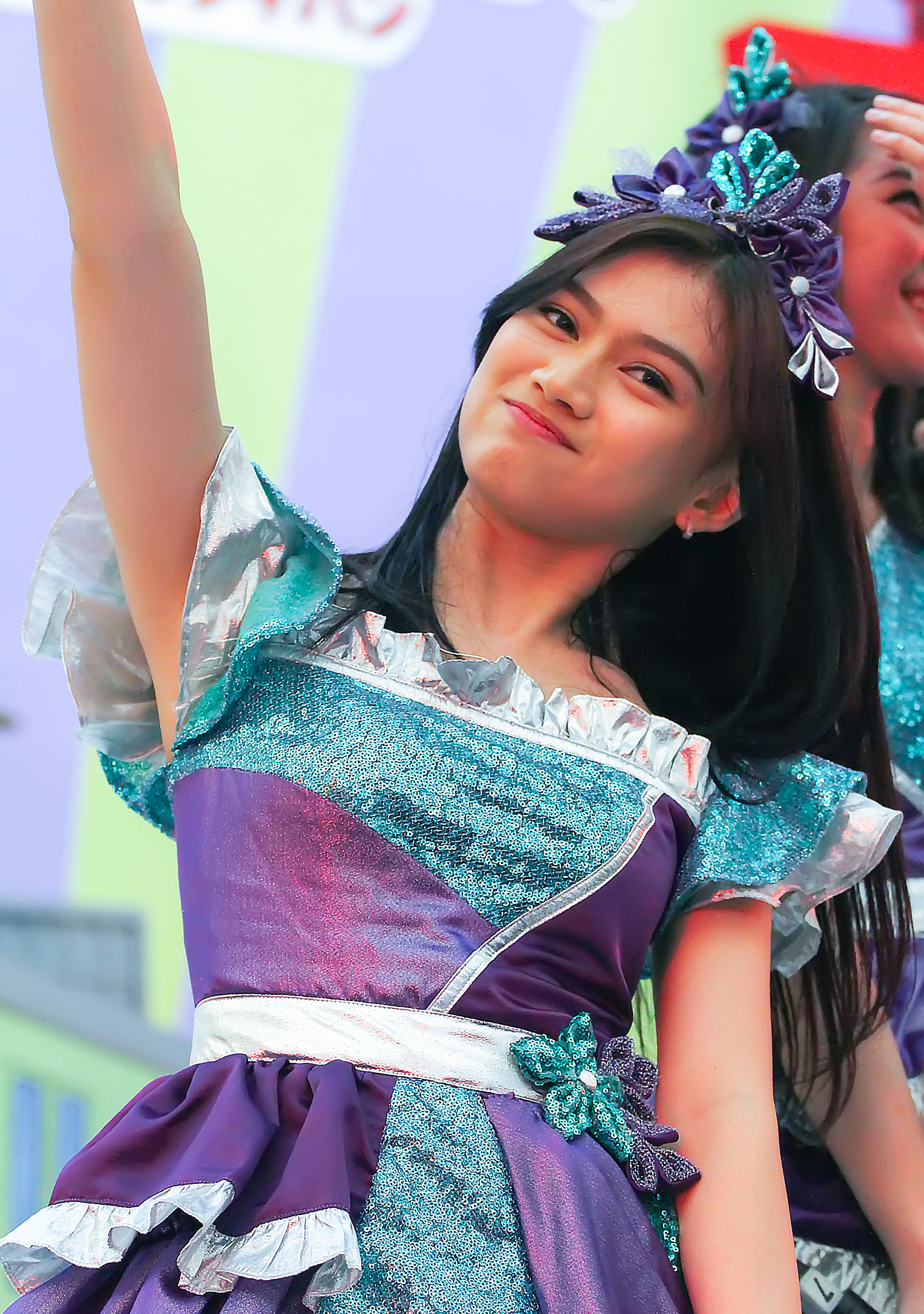
Melody Laksani

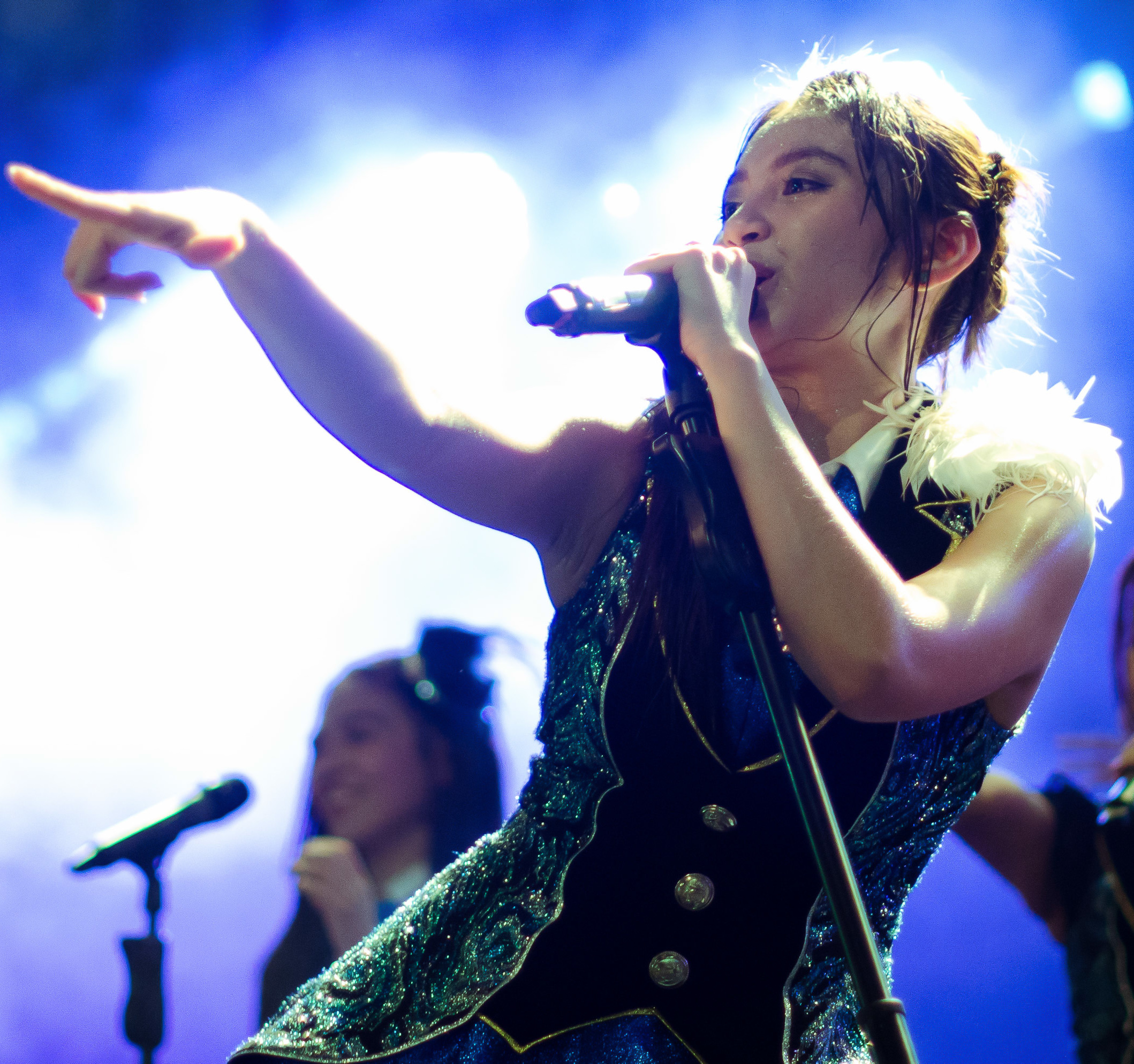
Nabilah Ratna has the longest tenure as the group's youngest member (2011–2014)

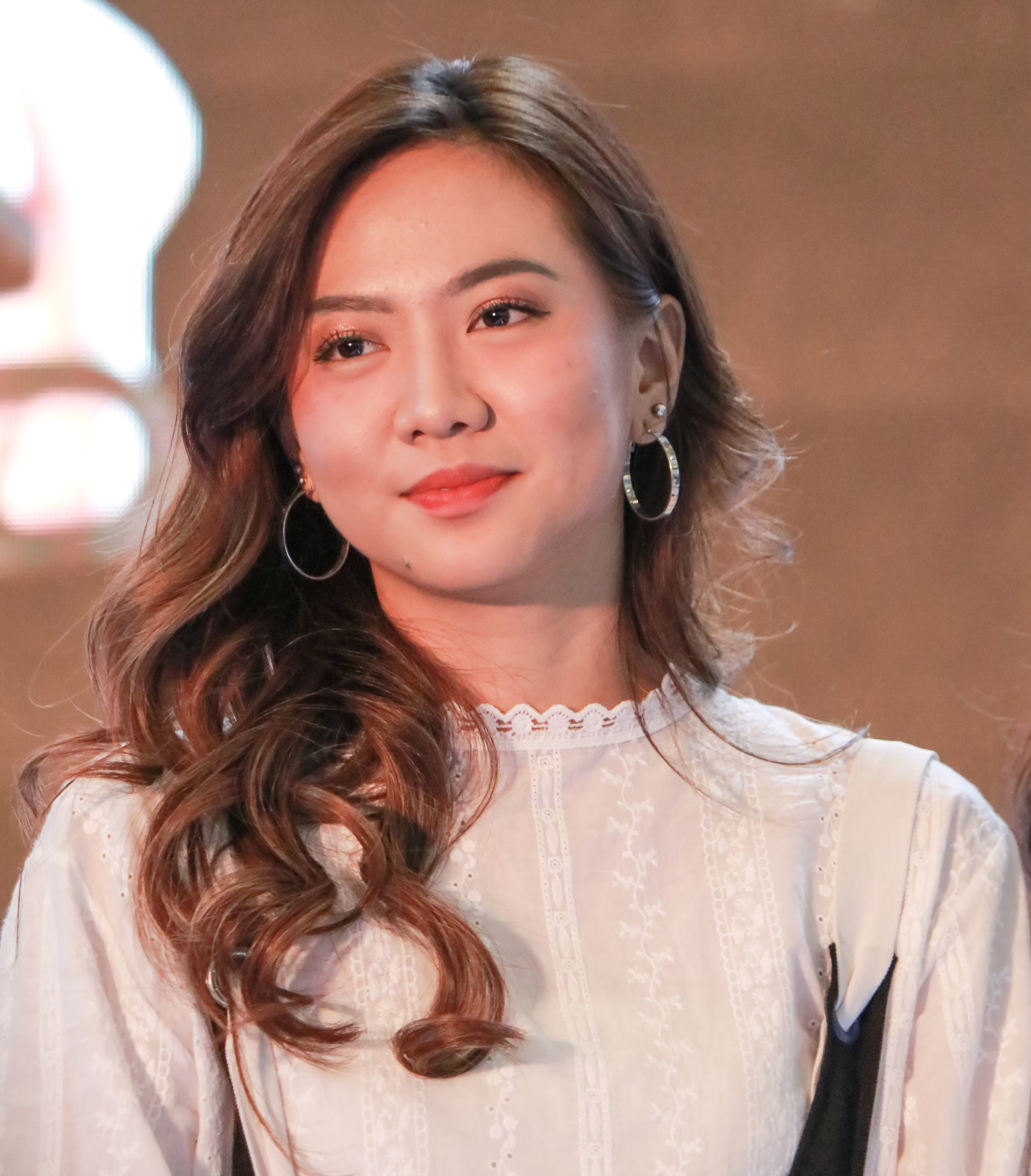
Shania Junianatha, the joint-most featured member in JKT48 singles; she appeared in 18 of its first 21 A-side singles (2013–2018).

The 28 first generation members of JKT48 were selected out of approximately 1,200 applicants. Following interviews in September 2011 and auditions held on 8–9 October 2011, 51 candidates were selected to proceed to the second round. These finalists were judged based on their dance performance to AKB48's single "Heavy Rotation", and singing a song of their choice. Members were announced following a six-hour final audition session on 2 November 2011. They were placed in Team J.

Rena Nozawa was the only first generation member who was not an Indonesian and also the first Japanese member in the group.

Upon Gabriela Margaret Warouw's graduation on 14 August 2022, this generation became the third batch to fully graduate from the group.

Name	Birth date	Status	Membership history
Alissa Galliamova	28 August 1993 (age 33)	Graduated on 21 January 2013	Active member (2 November 2011 – 23 December 2012); Team J (23 December 2012 – 21 January 2013)
Allisa Astri	23 June 1990 (age 36)	Contract terminated on 10 May 2012	Active member (2 November 2011 – 10 May 2012)
(Japan) Ayana Shahab	3 June 1997 (age 29)	Graduated on 8 December 2019	Active member (2 November 2011 – 23 December 2012); Team J (23 December 2012 – 30 November 2016); Team KIII (1 December 2016 – 30 June 2018); Team T (1 April 2018 – 8 December 2019)
Beby Chaesara Anadilla	18 March 1998 (age 28)	Graduated on 21 February 2021	Active member (2 November 2011 – 23 December 2012); Team J (23 December 2012 – 30 November 2016); Team KIII (1 December 2016 – 21 February 2021)
Cindy Christina Gulla	29 May 1997 (age 29)	Dismissed on 16 February 2014	Active member (2 November 2011 – 23 December 2012); Team J (23 December 2012 – 16 February 2014)
Cleopatra Djapri	20 December 1993 (age 32)	Graduated on 10 December 2012	Active member (2 November 2011 – 10 December 2012)
Delima Rizky	25 October 1997 (age 29)	Dismissed on 18 March 2016	Active member (2 November 2011 – 23 December 2012); Team J (23 December 2012 – 18 March 2016)
Devi Kinal Putri	2 January 1996 (age 30)	Graduated on 30 June 2018; JKT48 Academy Headmistress (15 April 2018 – 11 March 2021)	Active member (2 November 2011 – 23 December 2012); Team J (23 December 2012 – 31 July 2015); Team KIII (1 August 2015 – 30 November 2016); Team J (1 December 2016 – 30 June 2018)
Diasta Priswarini	9 September 1991 (age 35)	Graduated on 22 December 2013	Active member (2 November 2011 – 23 December 2012); Team J (23 December 2012 – 22 December 2013)
Fahira Al Idrus	27 July 1998 (age 28)	Contract terminated on 10 May 2012	Active member (2 November 2011 – 10 May 2012)
Frieska Anastasia Laksani	4 March 1996 (age 30)	Graduated on 20 February 2021	Active member (2 November 2011 – 23 December 2012); Team J (23 December 2012 – 30 November 2016); Team KIII (1 December 2016 – 30 June 2018); Team J (1 July 2018 – 20 February 2021)
Gabriela Margaret Warouw	11 April 1998 (age 28)	Graduated on 14 August 2022	Active member (2 November 2011 – 23 December 2012); Team J (23 December 2012 – 14 March 2021); Active member (15 March 2021 – 14 August 2022)
Ghaida Farisya	29 May 1995 (age 31)	Graduated on 20 November 2016	Active member (2 November 2011 – 23 December 2012); Team J (23 December 2012 – 20 November 2016)
Intania Pratama Ilham	19 July 1991 (age 35)	Resigned on 12 February 2012	Active member (2 November 2011 – 12 February 2012)
Jessica Vania Widjaja	22 January 1996 (age 30)	Graduated on 12 March 2017	Active member (2 November 2011 – 23 December 2012); Team J (23 December 2012 – 12 March 2017)
Jessica Veranda Tanumihardja	19 August 1993 (age 33)	Graduated on 25 May 2017	Active member (2 November 2011 – 23 December 2012); Team J (23 December 2012 – 25 May 2017)
Melody Nurramdhani Laksani	24 March 1992 (age 34)	Graduated on 31 March 2018; General Manager of JKT48 Theater (1 August 2015 – present)	Active member (2 November 2011 – 23 December 2012); Team J (23 December 2012 – 31 March 2018); Team T (1 December 2016 – 31 March 2018)
Nabilah Ratna Ayu Azalia	11 November 1999 (age 26)	Resigned on 31 October 2017	Active member (2 November 2011 – 23 December 2012); Team J (23 December 2012 – 31 October 2017)
Neneng Rosdiana	24 January 1999 (age 27)	Graduated on 25 November 2012	Active member (2 November 2011 – 25 November 2012)
(Japan) Rena Nozawa	6 May 1998 (age 28)	Transferred to AKB48 Team B, concurrent position revoked on 24 February 2014	Active member (2 November 2011 – 23 December 2012); Team J (23 December 2012 – 24 February 2014)
Rezky Wiranti Dhike	22 November 1995 (age 30)	Graduated on 13 September 2016	Active member (2 November 2011 – 23 December 2012); Team J (23 December 2012 – 13 September 2016)
Rica Leyona	19 August 1991 (age 35)	Resigned on 7 December 2014	Active member (2 November 2011 – 23 December 2012); Team J (23 December 2012 – 7 December 2014)
Sendy Ariani	12 August 1993 (age 33)	Dismissed on 1 December 2016	Active member (2 November 2011 – 23 December 2012); Team J (23 December 2012 – 30 November 2016); Team KIII (1 December 2016)
Shania Junianatha	27 June 1998 (age 28)	Graduated on 28 April 2019	Active member (2 November 2011 – 23 December 2012); Team J (23 December 2012 – 28 April 2019)
Siti Gayatri Abhirma	11 March 1993 (age 33)	Resigned on 12 February 2012	Active member (2 November 2011 – 12 February 2012)
Sonia Natalia Winarto	17 December 1997 (age 28)	Graduated on 7 December 2019	Active member (2 November 2011 – 23 December 2012); Team J (23 December 2012 – 30 November 2016); Team KIII (1 December 2016 – 30 June 2018); Team T (1 July 2018 – 7 December 2019)
Sonya Pandarmawan	18 May 1996 (age 30)	Graduated on 22 December 2013	Active member (2 November 2011 – 23 December 2012); Team J (23 December 2012 – 22 December 2013)
Stella Cornelia Winarto	3 November 1994 (age 31)	Graduated on 28 December 2013	Active member (2 November 2011 – 23 December 2012); Team J (23 December 2012 – 28 December 2013)

=== Second generation ===
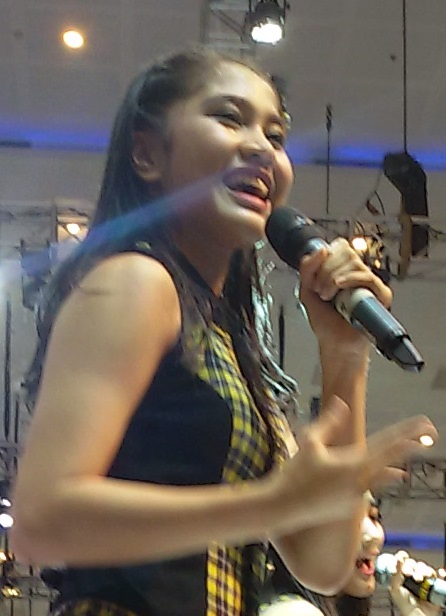
Alicia C. A. Kumaseh

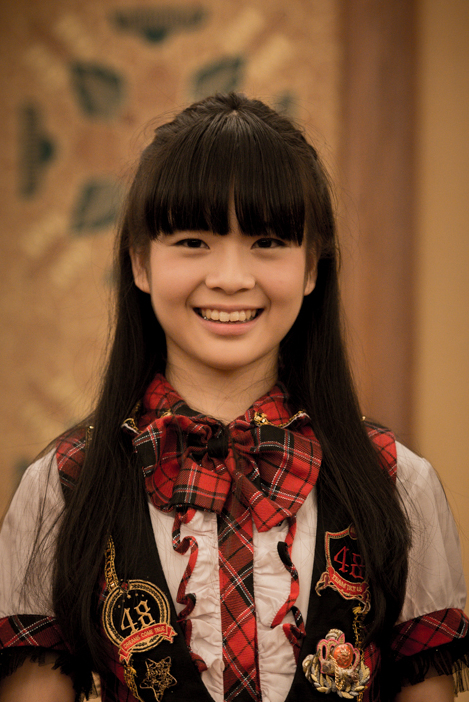
Cindy Yuvia, the joint-most featured member in JKT48 singles; she appeared in 18 of its first 21 A-side singles (2013–2019).

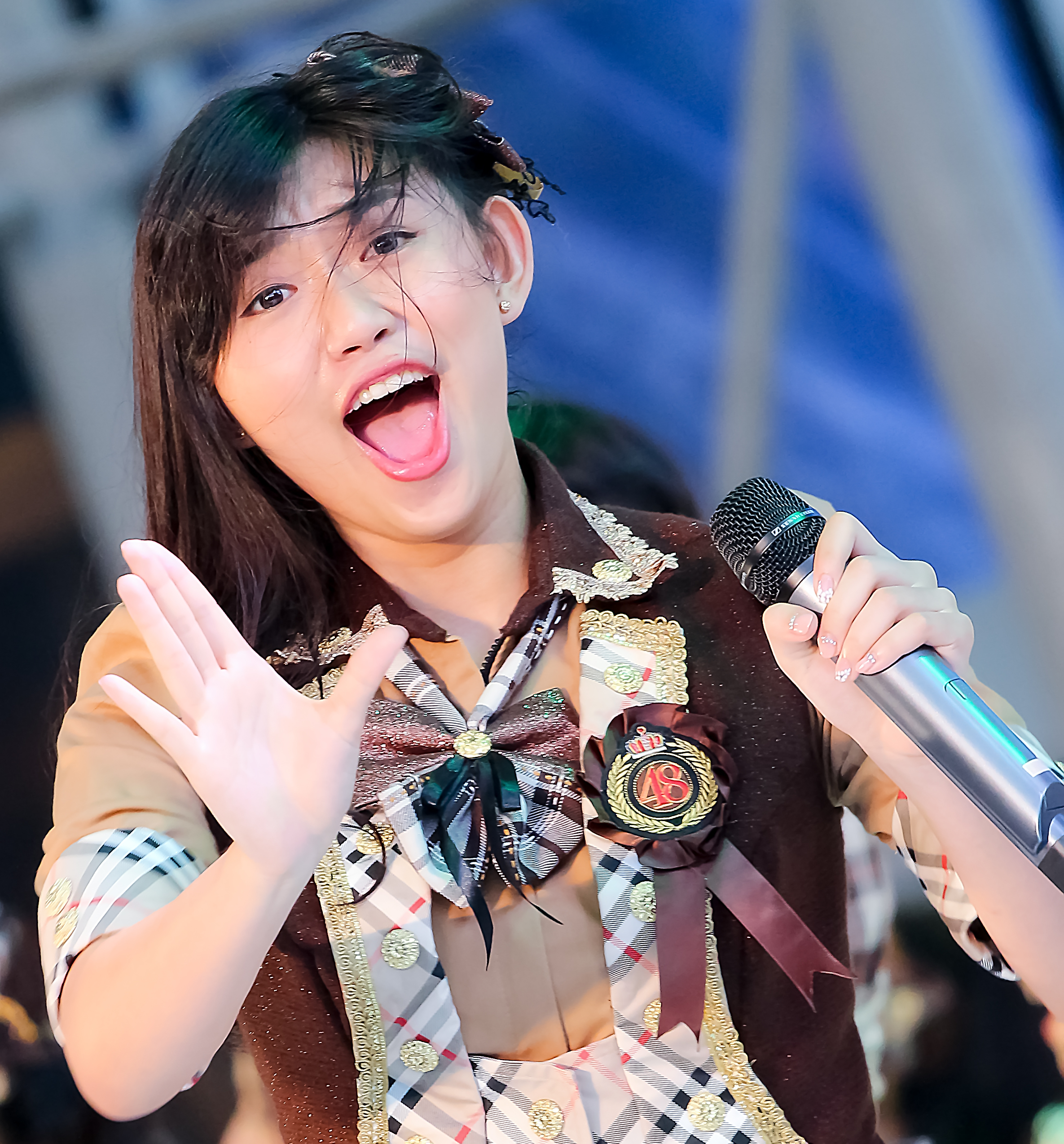
Hanna Sutiono

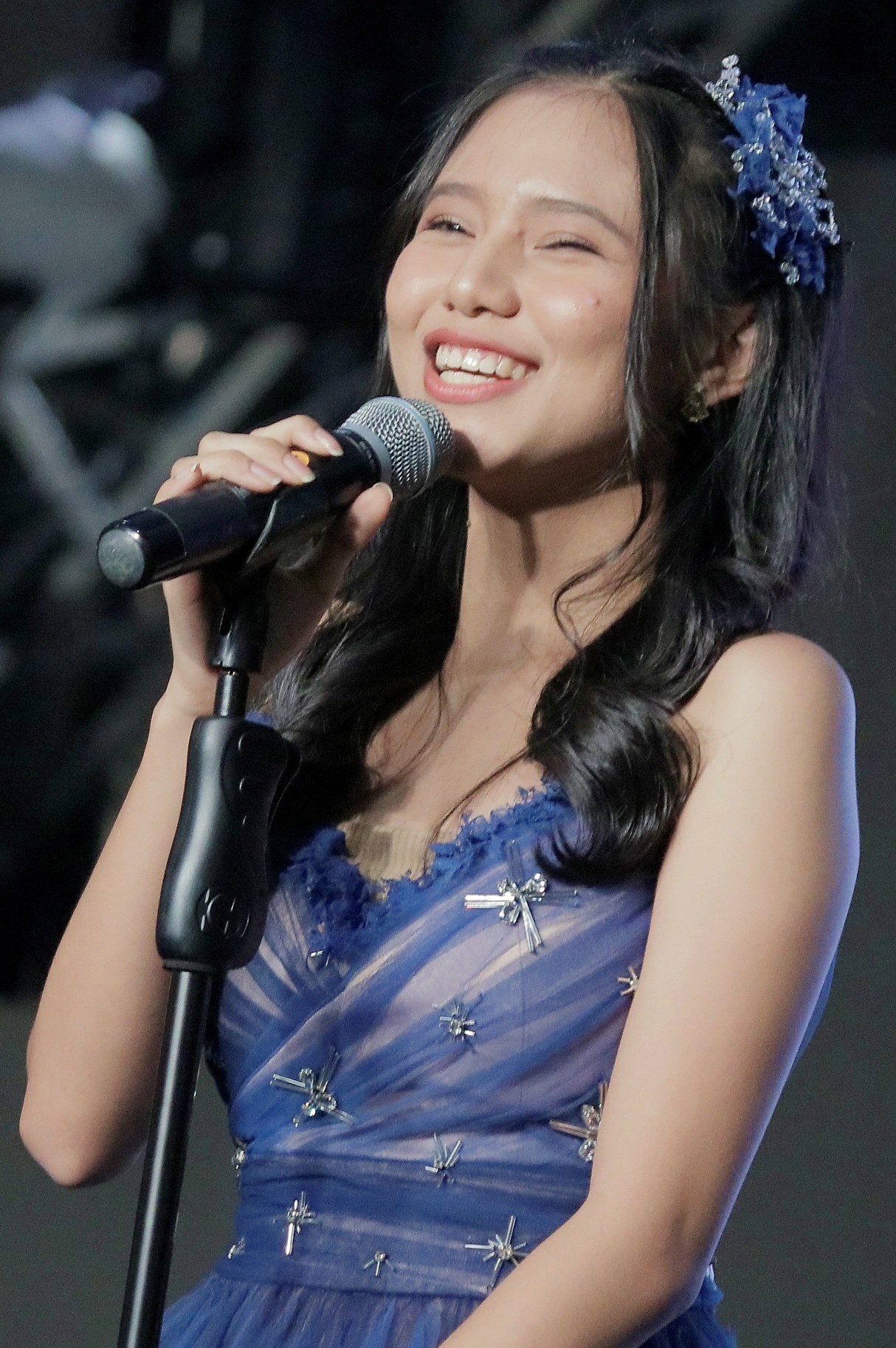
J. Rachel Natasya Nalenan

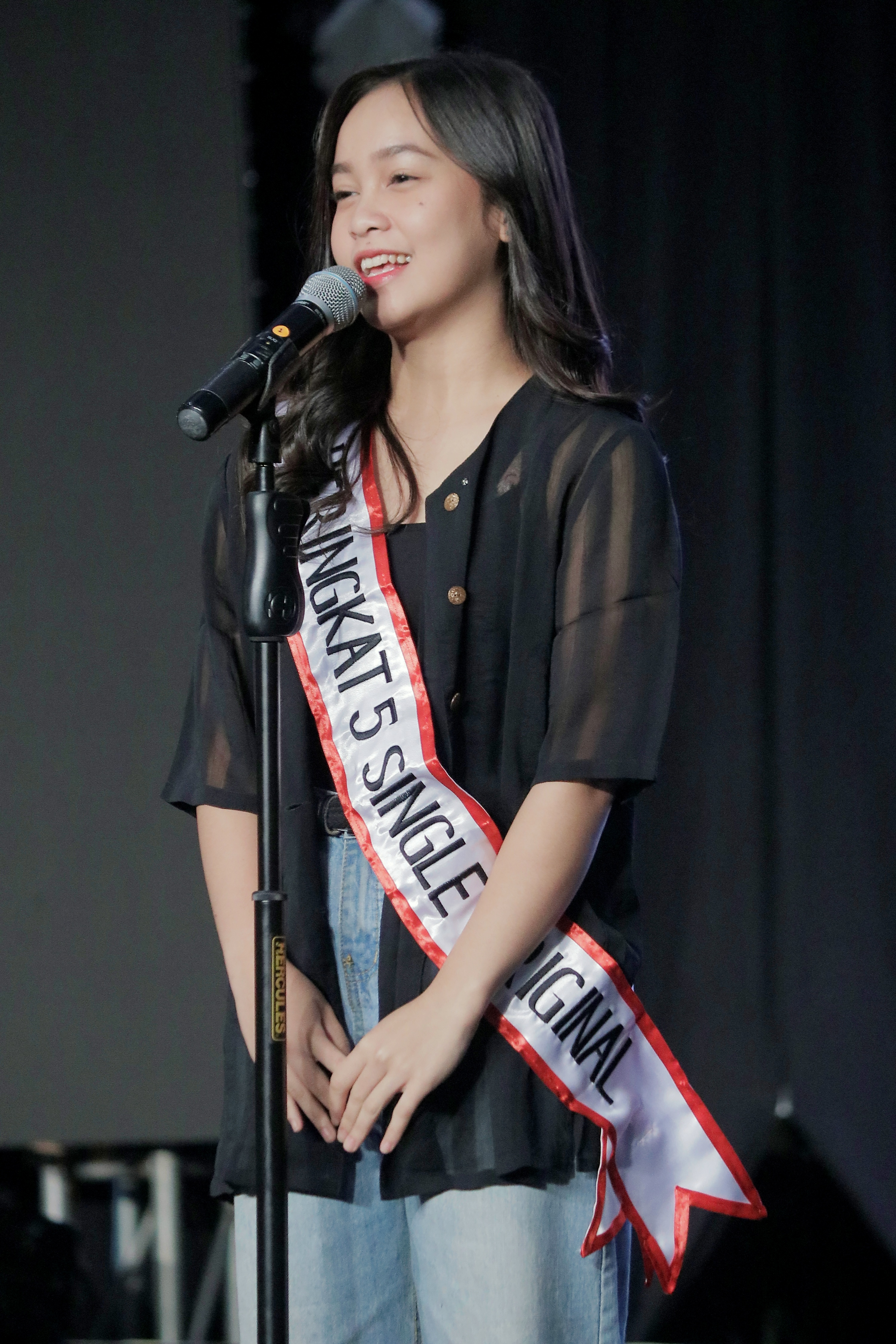
Nadila Cindi Wantari

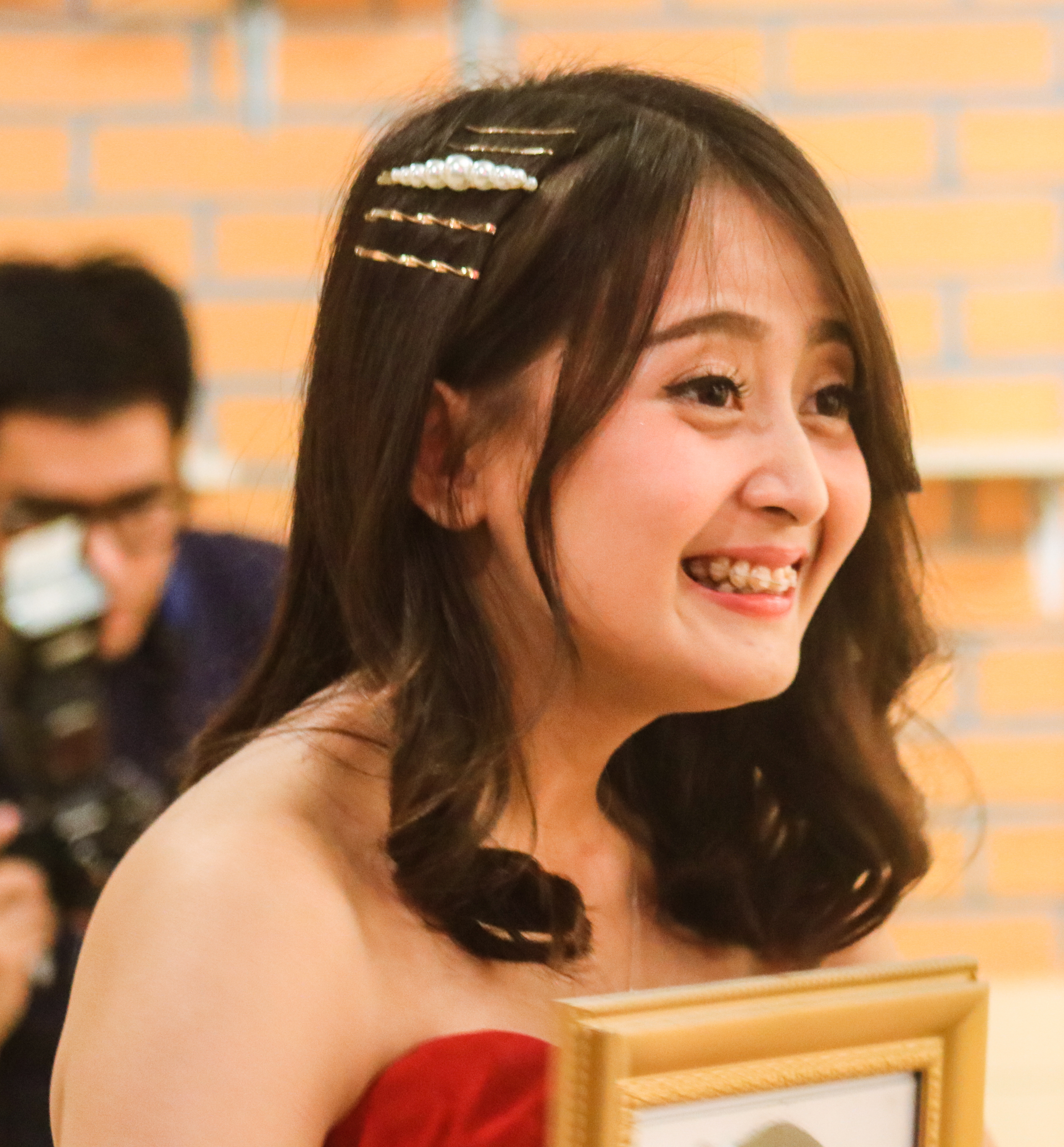
Natalia

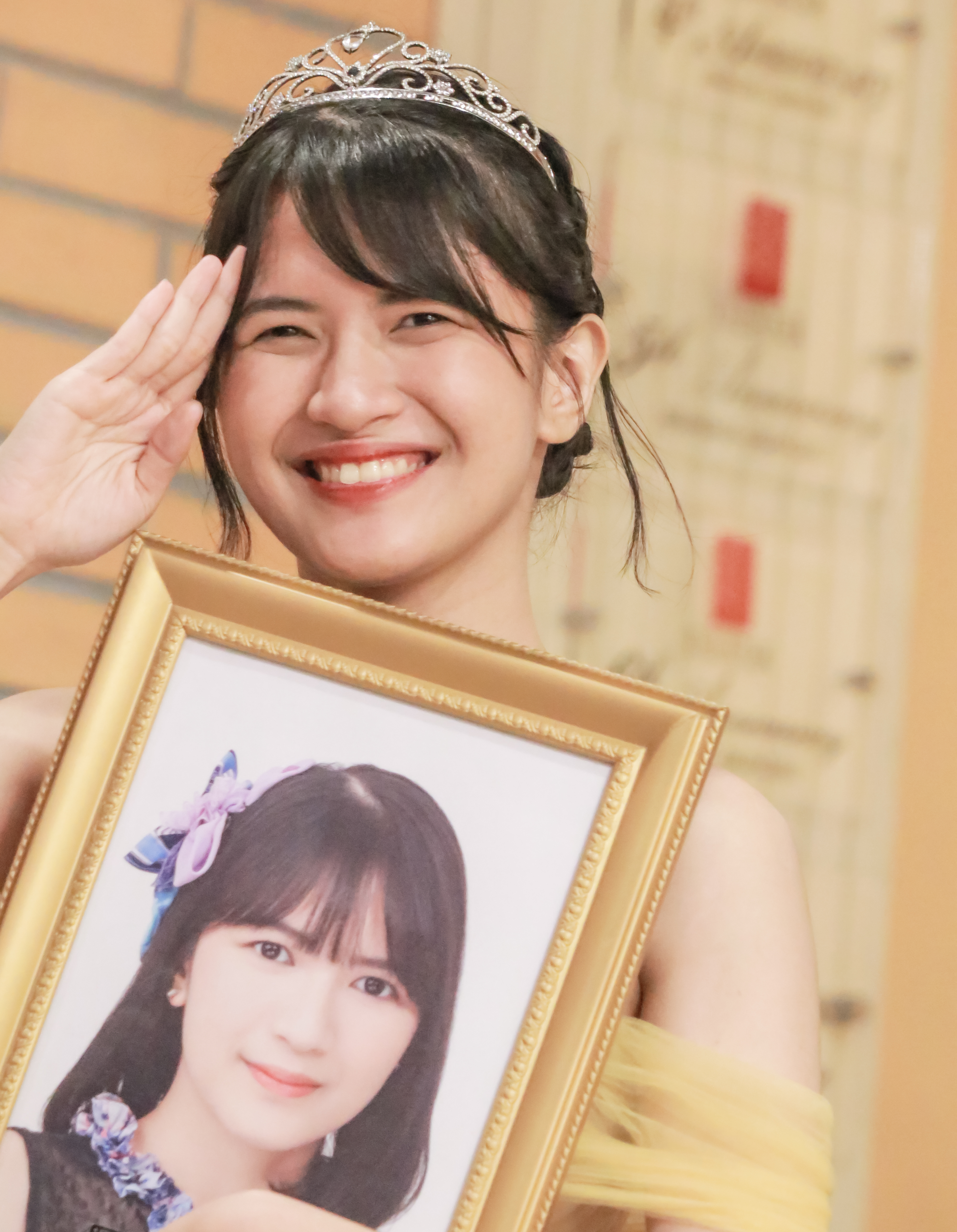
Ratu Vienny Fitrilya, the only member to captain the same team more than once.

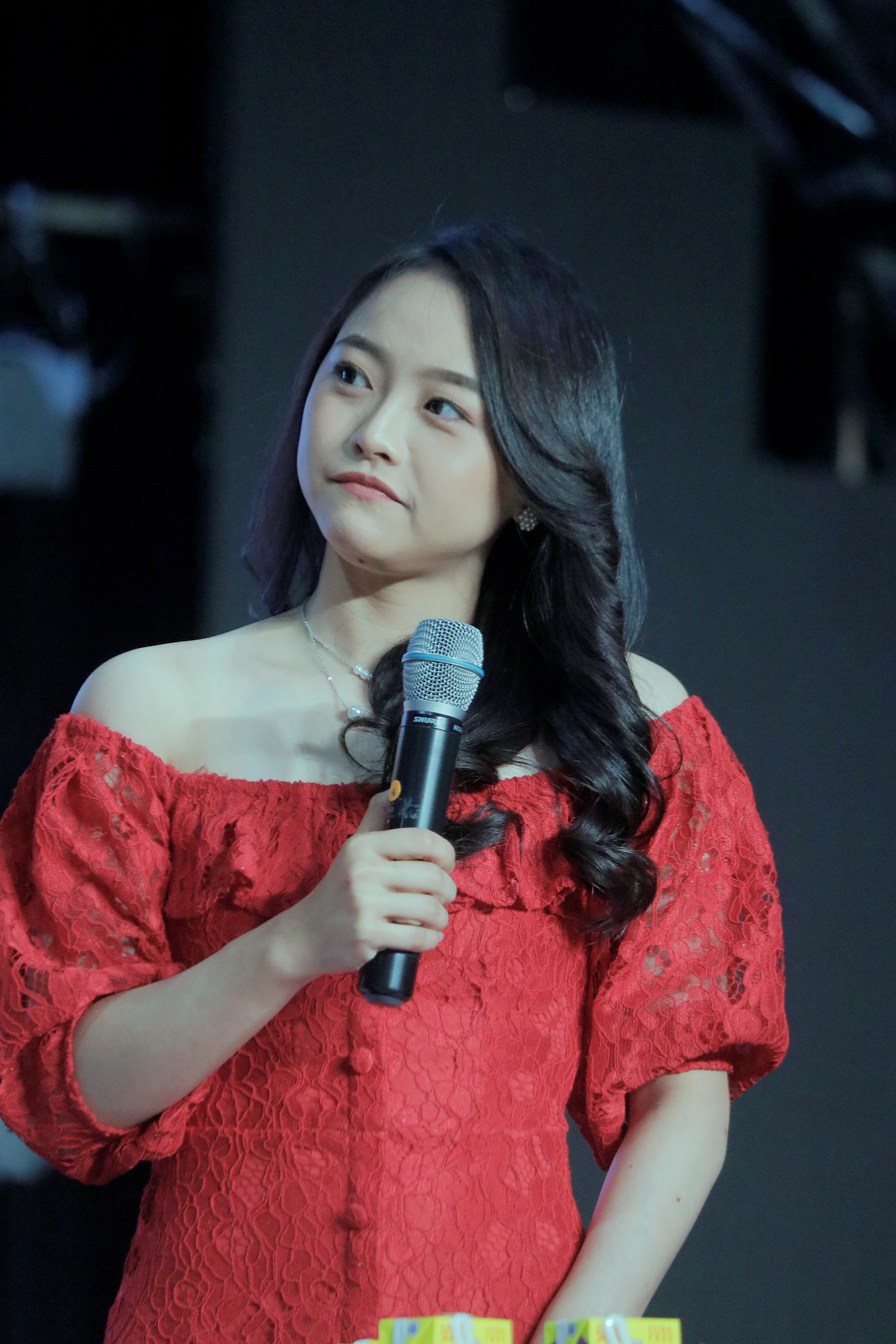
Rona Ariesta Anggreani

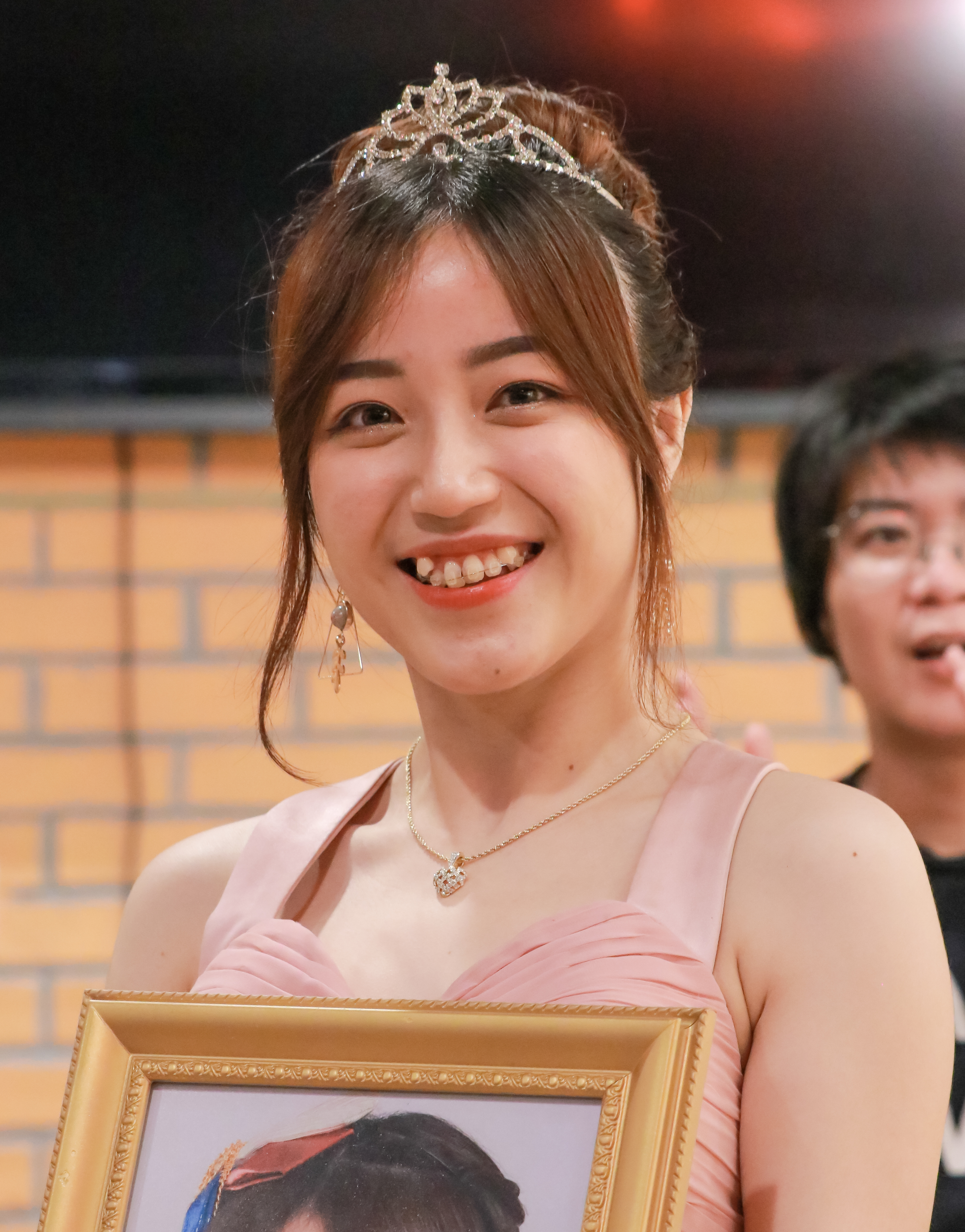
Sinka Juliani

The group's management began accepting applications for second generation members on 13 August 2012. Of the 4,500 applicants, approximately 200 were selected for interviews the following month. The pool was then narrowed down from 67 to 31 in a selection round broadcast by partnering television channel RCTI. All 31 finalists were eventually chosen as second-generation members at a final audition on 3 November 2012 in Japan. Of the second-generation members, 18 were chosen as part of the original Team KIII formed on 25 June 2013, while the rest were grouped as trainees. This is, as of the 13th generation (2024), the only generation never to have any of its members as the group's youngest member.

Upon Rona Ariesta Anggreani's graduation on 15 February 2021 and not counting the then-cancelled tenth generation, this generation became the first to fully graduate from the group.

Name	Birth date	Status	Membership history
Alicia Chensia Ayu Kumaseh	24 May 1999 (age 27)	Graduated on 4 August 2019	Active member (3 November – 23 December 2012); Trainee (23 December 2012 – 25 June 2013); Team KIII (25 June 2013 – 4 August 2019)
Althea Callista	11 July 1997 (age 29)	Graduated on 10 January 2013	Active member (3 November – 23 December 2012); Trainee (23 December 2012 – 10 January 2013)
Annisa Athia Zainun Faqiha (written as Annisa Athia)	8 October 1997 (age 29)	Resigned on 9 September 2013	Active member (3 November – 23 December 2012); Trainee (23 December 2012 – 9 September 2013)
Cindy Yuvia	14 January 1998 (age 28)	Graduated on 27 July 2019	Active member (3 November – 23 December 2012); Trainee (23 December 2012 – 25 June 2013); Team KIII (25 June 2013 – 30 June 2018); Team J (1 July 2018 – 27 July 2019)
Della Delila	15 November 1998 (age 27)	Graduated on 31 March 2019	Active member (3 November – 23 December 2012); Trainee (23 December 2012 – 25 June 2013); Team KIII (25 June 2013 – 30 November 2016); Team J (1 December 2016 – 31 March 2019)
Dellia Erdita	19 December 1996 (age 29)	Resigned on 30 November 2013	Active member (3 November – 23 December 2012); Trainee (23 December 2012 – 30 November 2013)
Dena Siti Rohyati	15 March 1997 (age 29)	Resigned on 5 April 2018	Active member (3 November – 23 December 2012); Trainee (23 December 2012 – 18 May 2014); Team J (18 May 2014 – 1 December 2017); Trainee (1 December 2017 – 5 April 2018)
Dwi Putri Bonita	17 November 1997 (age 28)	Graduated on 30 September 2018	Active member (3 November – 23 December 2012); Trainee (23 December 2012 – 25 June 2013); Team KIII (25 June 2013 – 30 November 2016); Team J (1 December 2016 – 30 September 2018)
Fakhriyani Harrya Shafariyanti	14 July 1995 (age 31)	Graduated on 25 March 2018	Active member (3 November – 23 December 2012); Trainee (23 December 2012 – 18 May 2014); Team KIII (18 May 2014 – 25 March 2018)
Hanna Sutiono (written as Jennifer Hanna)	26 January 1998 (age 28)	Graduated on 27 September 2016	Active member (3 November – 23 December 2012); Trainee (23 December 2012 – 25 June 2013); Team KIII (25 June 2013 – 27 September 2016)
Intar Maylica Putri Kariina (written as Intar Putri Kariina)	23 October 1997 (age 29)	Resigned on 9 September 2013	Active member (3 November – 23 December 2012); Trainee (23 December 2012 – 25 June 2013); Team KIII (25 June – 9 September 2013)
Jennifer Rachel Natasya Nalenan	10 April 1999 (age 27)	Graduated on 5 January 2020	Active member (3 November – 23 December 2012); Trainee (23 December 2012 – 23 February 2014); Team J (23 February 2014 – 30 November 2016); Team KIII (1 December 2016 – 5 January 2020)
Lidya Maulida Djuhandar	17 August 1996 (age 30)	Graduated on 27 October 2018	Active member (3 November – 23 December 2012); Trainee (23 December 2012 – 25 June 2013); Team KIII (25 June 2013 – 27 October 2018)
Nadhifa Karimah	24 November 1995 (age 30)	Resigned on 30 November 2013	Active member (3 November – 23 December 2012); Trainee (23 December 2012 – 30 November 2013)
Nadila Cindi Wantari	23 September 1998 (age 28)	Graduated on 7 February 2021	Active member (3 November – 23 December 2012); Trainee (23 December 2012 – 25 June 2013); Team KIII (25 June 2013 – 20 July 2019); Team J (21 July 2019 – 7 February 2021)
Natalia	28 December 1996 (age 29)	Graduated on 20 July 2019	Active member (3 November – 23 December 2012); Trainee (23 December 2012 – 25 June 2013); Team KIII (25 June 2013 – 20 July 2019)
Noella Sisterina	16 November 1997 (age 28)	Resigned on 27 February 2015	Active member (3 November – 23 December 2012); Trainee (23 December 2012 – 25 June 2013); Team KIII (25 June 2013 – 27 February 2015)
Novinta Dhini Soetopo	26 November 1995 (age 30)	Resigned on 17 August 2015	Active member (3 November – 23 December 2012); Trainee (23 December 2012 – 18 May 2014); Team KIII (18 May 2014 – 17 August 2015)
Nurhalimah Oktavianti (written as Nurhalima Oktavianti)	18 October 1996 (age 30)	Graduated on 10 January 2013	Active member (3 November – 23 December 2012); Trainee (23 December 2012 – 10 January 2013)
Octi Sevpin Cahyaning Ayu (written as Octi Sevpin)	7 October 1997 (age 29)	Resigned on 23 January 2014	Active member (3 November – 23 December 2012); Trainee (23 December 2012 – 25 June 2013); Team KIII (25 June 2013 – 23 January 2014)
(Netherlands) Olivia Shafira Robberecht (written as Olivia Robberecht)	21 May 1997 (age 29)	Resigned on 12 April 2013	Active member (3 November – 23 December 2012); Trainee (23 December 2012 – 12 April 2013)
Priscillia Sari Dewi	5 April 1999 (age 27)	Resigned on 31 July 2018	Active member (3 November – 23 December 2012); Trainee (23 December 2012 – 18 May 2014); Team KIII (18 May 2014 – 30 November 2016); Team J (1 December 2016 – 7 June 2018); Class A Academy (7 June – 31 July 2018)
Ratu Vienny Fitrilya	23 February 1996 (age 30)	Graduated on 23 February 2020	Active member (3 November – 23 December 2012); Trainee (23 December 2012 – 25 June 2013); Team KIII (25 June 2013 – 12 October 2017); Trainee (12 October 2017 – 23 February 2018); Team KIII (23 February 2018 – 23 February 2020)
Riskha Fairunissa	22 March 1996 (age 30)	Graduated on 29 December 2018	Active member (3 November – 23 December 2012); Trainee (23 December 2012 – 25 June 2013); Team KIII (25 June 2013 – 30 November 2016); Team J (1 December 2016 – 29 December 2018)
Rona Ariesta Anggreani	19 March 1995 (age 31)	Graduated on 15 February 2021	Active member (3 November – 23 December 2012); Trainee (23 December 2012 – 25 June 2013); Team KIII (25 June 2013 – 20 July 2019); Team J (21 July 2019 – 15 February 2021)
Saktia Oktapyani	1 October 1995 (age 31)	Graduated on 31 March 2019	Active member (3 November – 23 December 2012); Trainee (23 December 2012 – 18 May 2014); Team KIII (18 May 2014 – 30 November 2016); Team J (1 December 2016 – 31 March 2019)
Shinta Naomi	4 June 1994 (age 32)	Graduated on 29 December 2018	Active member (3 November – 23 December 2012); Trainee (23 December 2012 – 25 June 2013); Team KIII (25 June 2013 – 31 July 2015); Team J (1 August 2015 – 30 November 2016); Team KIII (1 December 2016 – 29 December 2018)
Sinka Juliani	4 July 1996 (age 30)	Graduated on 5 October 2019	Active member (3 November – 23 December 2012); Trainee (23 December 2012 – 25 June 2013); Team KIII (25 June 2013 – 30 November 2016); Team J (1 December 2016 – 5 October 2019)
Thalia	22 December 1996 (age 29)	Left on 26 August 2015	Active member (3 November – 23 December 2012); Trainee (23 December 2012 – 25 June 2013); Team KIII (25 June 2013 – 26 August 2015)
Thalia Ivanka Elizabeth Frederik	29 June 1999 (age 27)	Graduated on 6 December 2019	Active member (3 November – 23 December 2012); Trainee (23 December 2012 – 23 February 2014); Team J (23 February 2014 – 30 June 2018); Team T (1 July 2018 – 6 December 2019)
Viviyona Apriani	13 April 1994 (age 32)	Graduated on 21 December 2019	Active member (3 November – 23 December 2012); Trainee (23 December 2012 – 25 June 2013); Team KIII (25 June 2013 – 30 November 2016); Team J (1 December 2016 – 31 January 2018); Team KIII (1 February 2018 – 21 December 2019)

=== Third generation ===
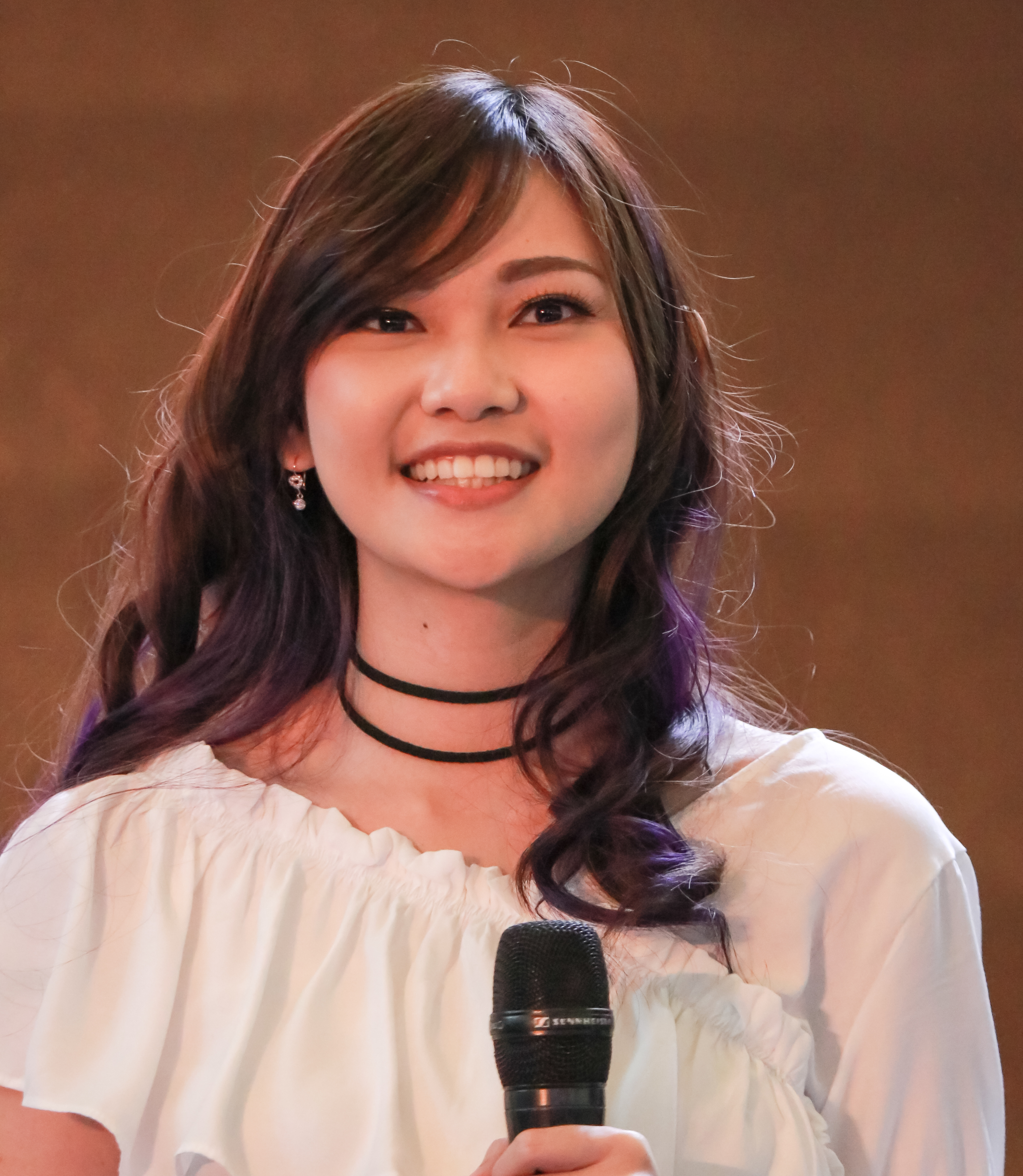
Andela Yuwono

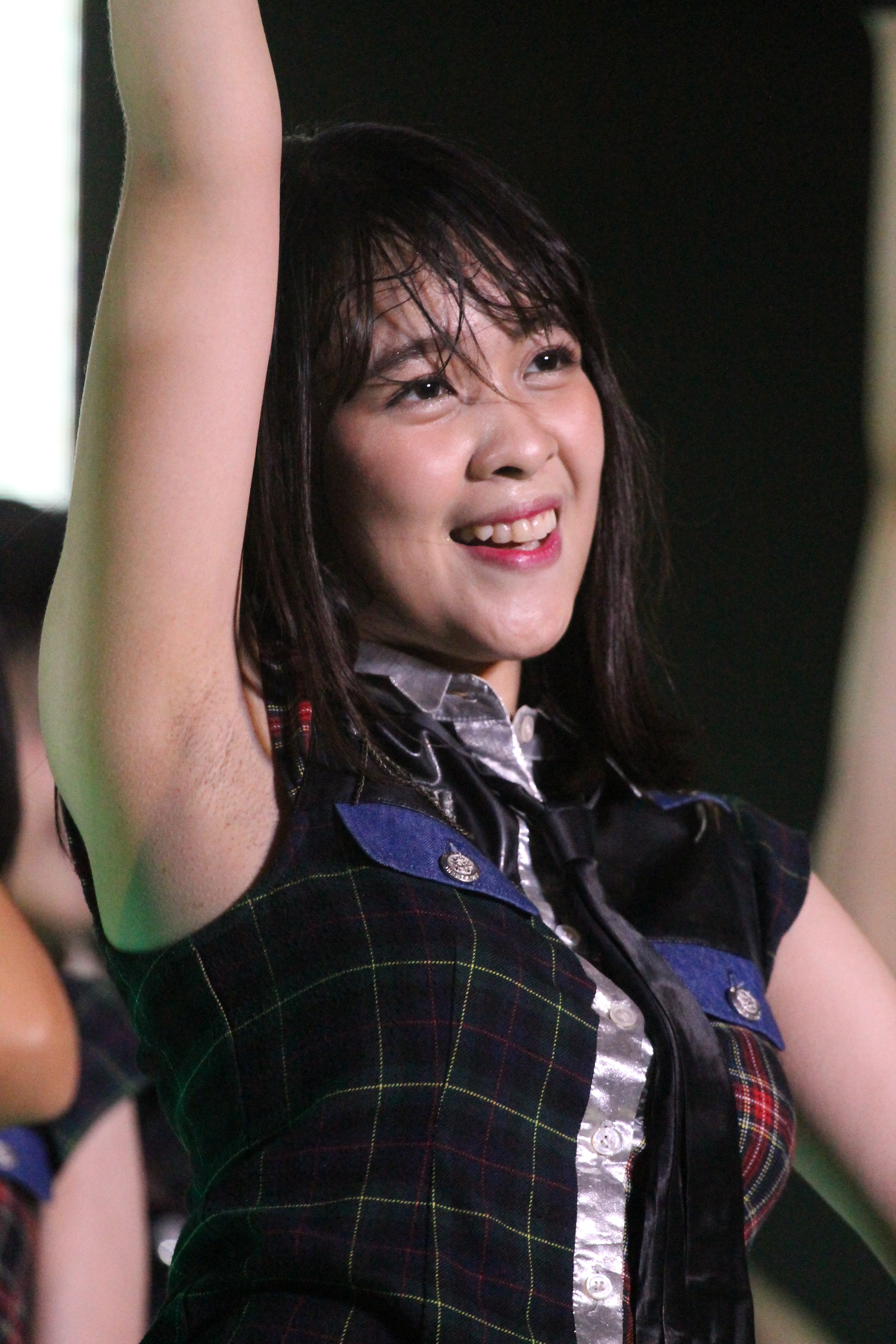
Aninditha R. Cahyadi, the only one to ever become member of JKT48's all three teams concurrently.

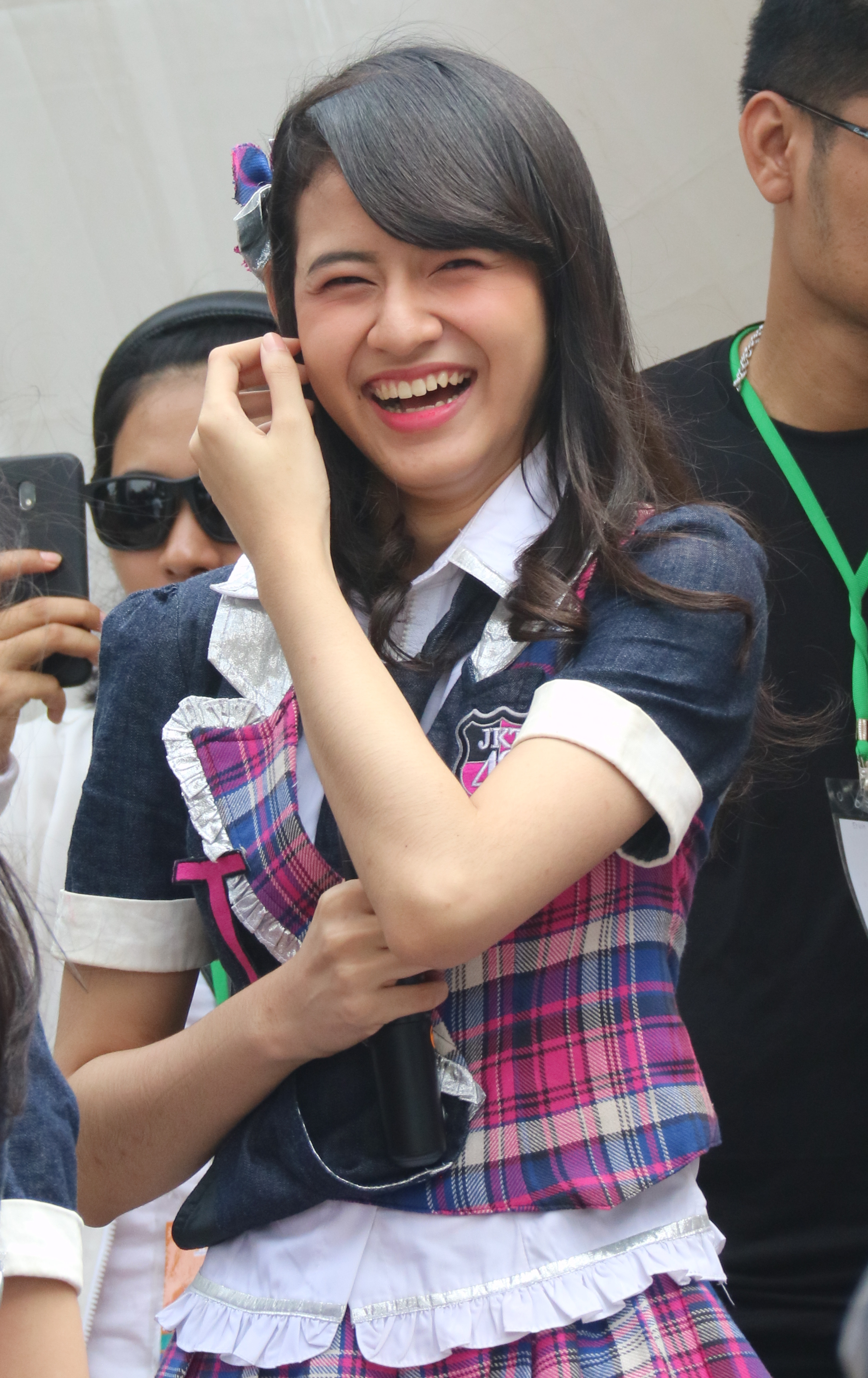
Ayu Safira Oktaviani

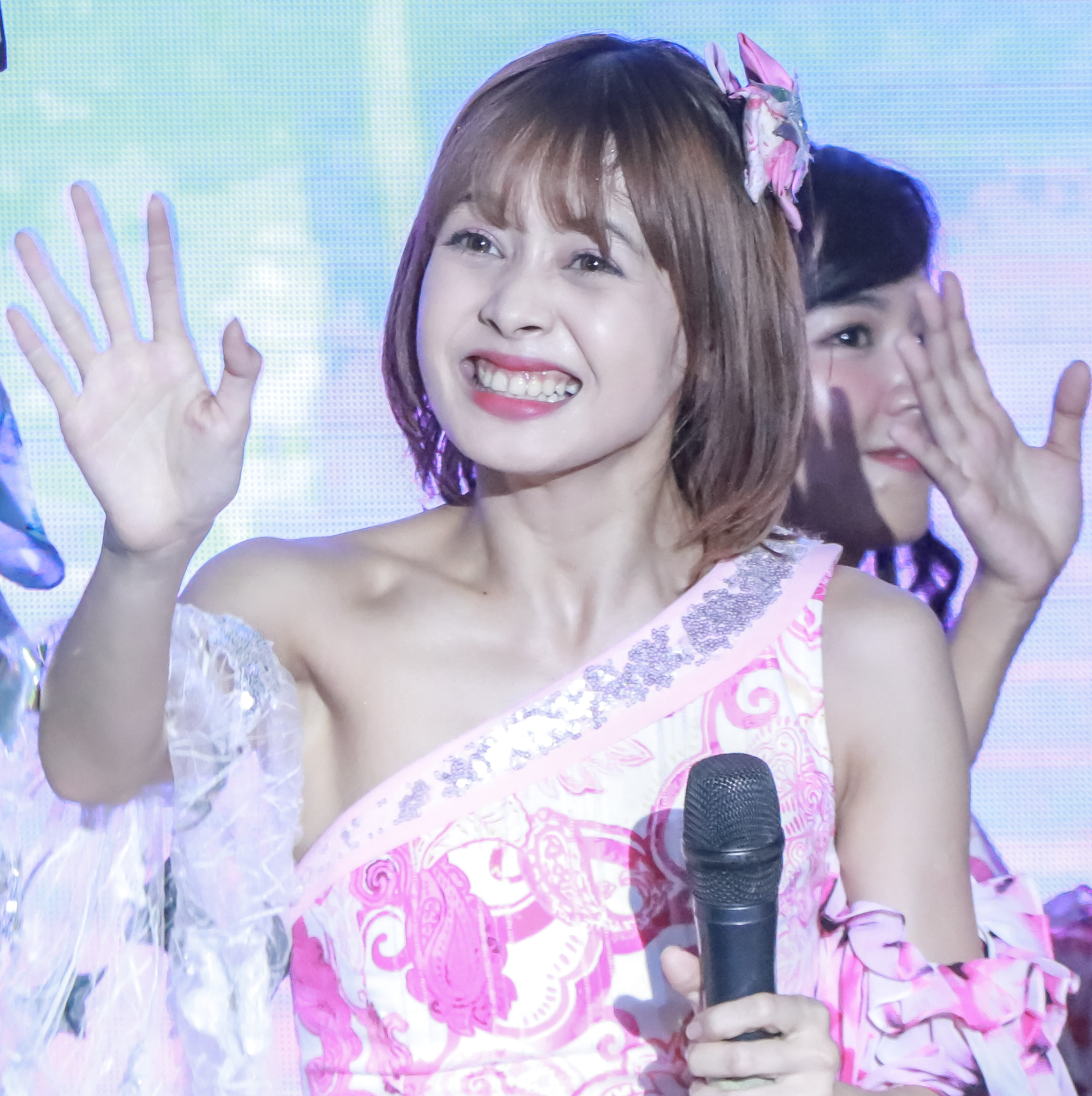
Feni Fitriyanti, the group's last remaining pre-2018 member.

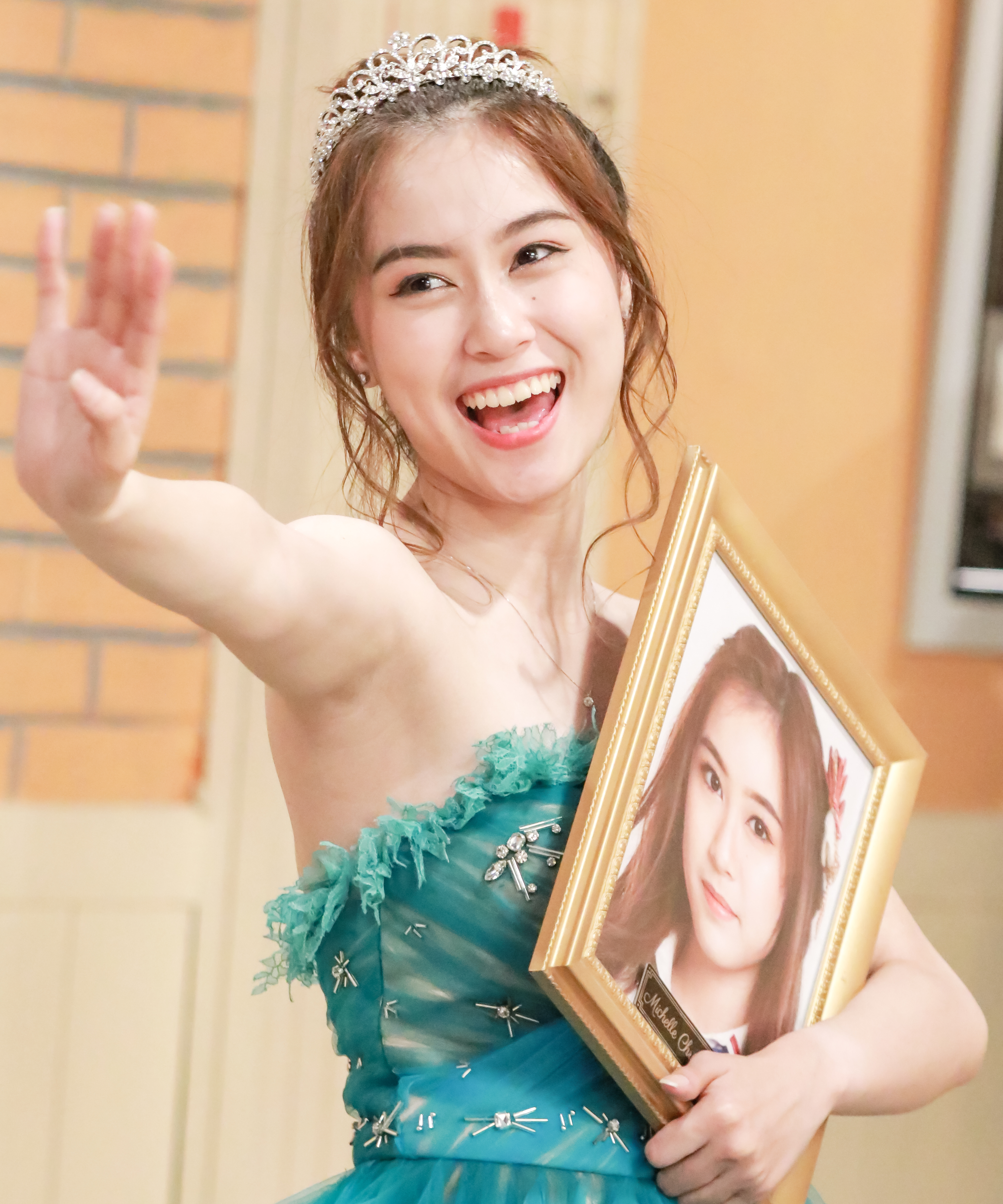
Michelle C. Kusnadi

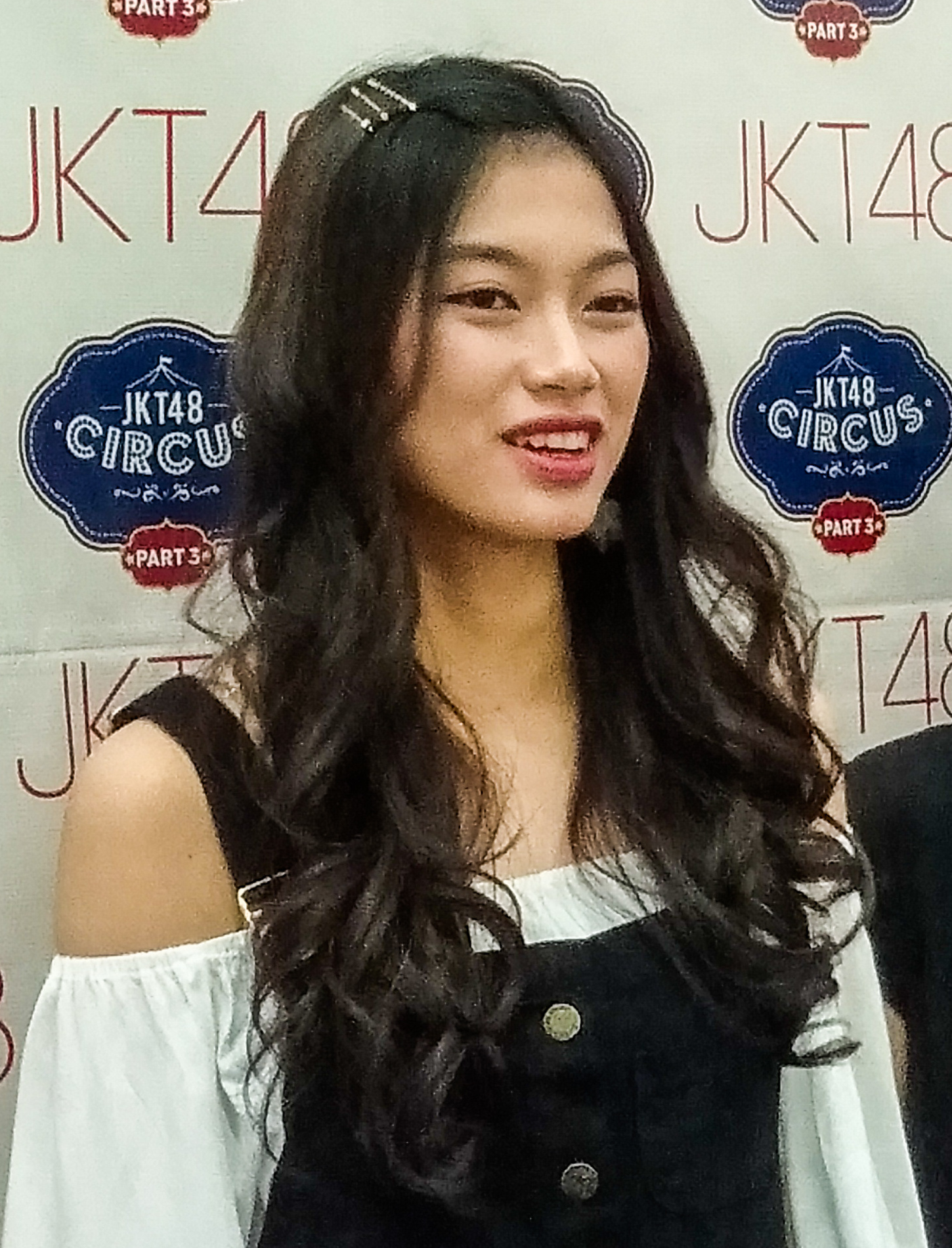
Maria G. Natalia Desy P. Gunawan

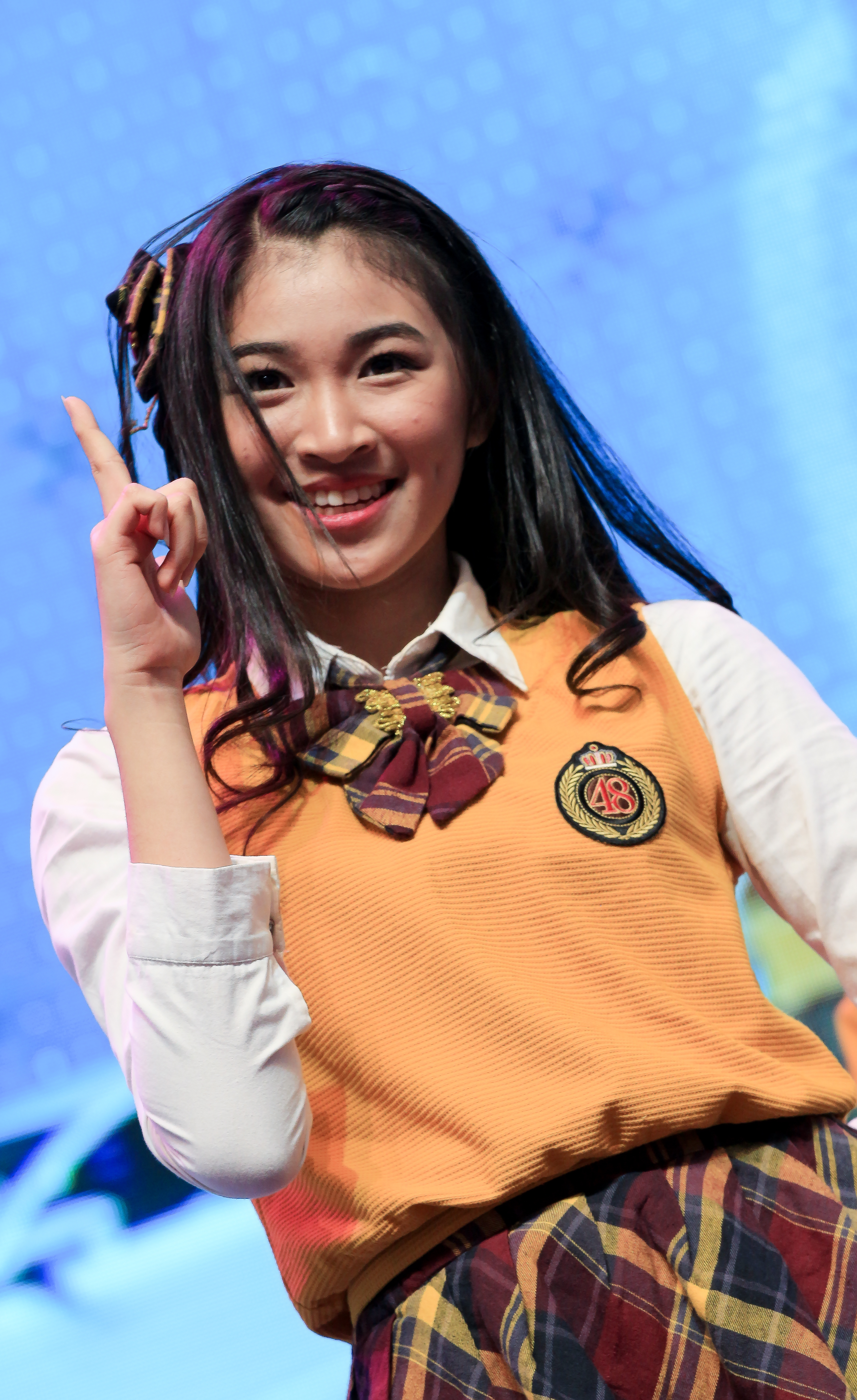
Shani I. Natio, the first non-original JKT48 member to become the group's captain.

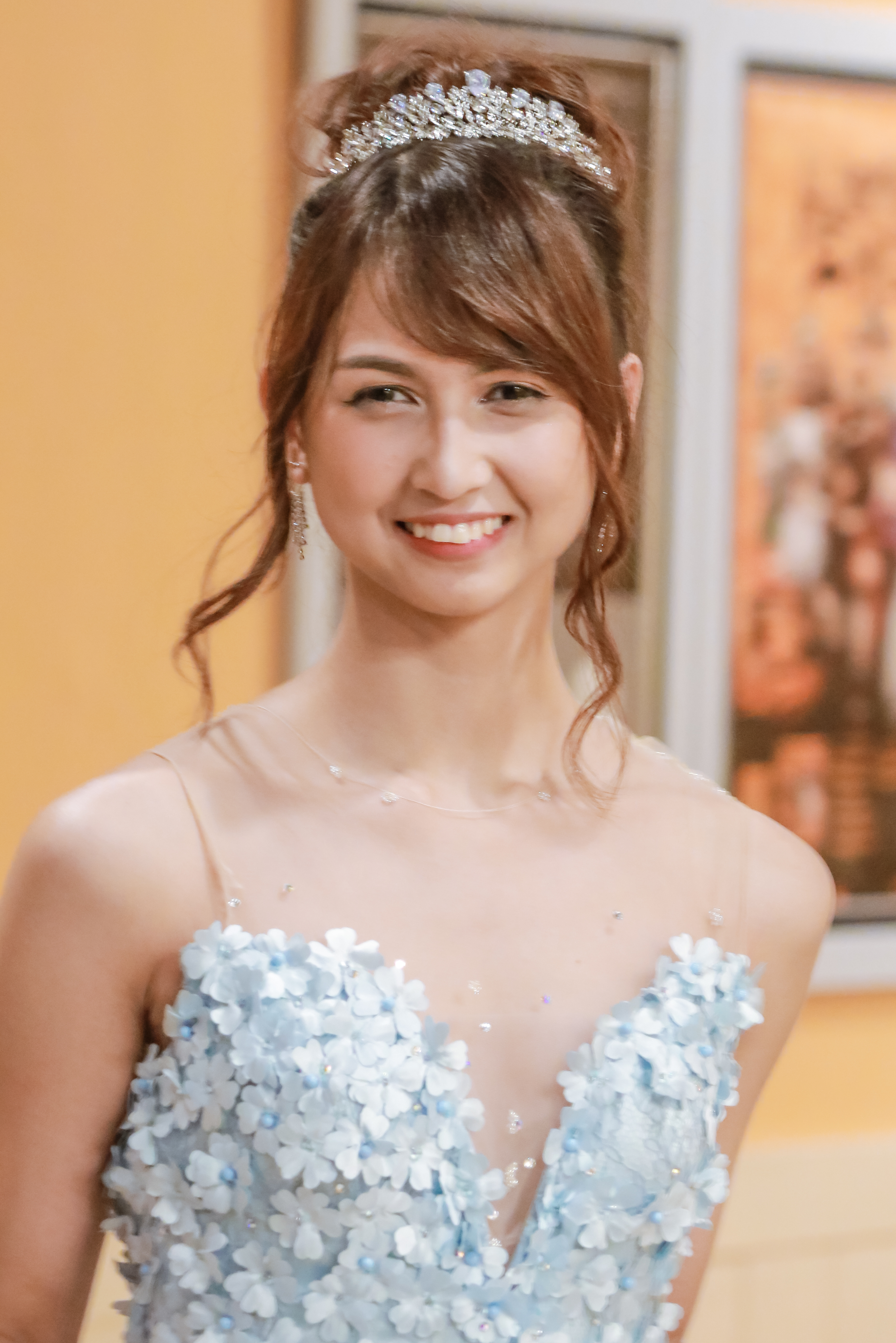
Stephanie Pricilla I. P., the first to ever become member of JKT48's all three teams.

On 4 February 2014, JKT48 announced the names of 63 finalists that are vying to become JKT48 trainees in the third generation.

On 15 March 2014, JKT48 announced selected candidates to become JKT48 newest trainees. This generation brought Kezia Putri Andinta as the first member to be born in the 21st century, on 28 January 2001 to be exact.

Pipit Ananda became the first trainee of this generation to leave the group. She left only nine days into her membership, the shortest ever tenure in JKT48 history until Kanya Caya broke the record on 6 October 2018 with seven days.

Name	Birth date	Status	Membership history
Alycia Ferryana Mamahit	22 May 1998 (age 28)	Left on 1 February 2016	Trainee (15 March 2014 – 1 February 2016)
Amanda Dwi Arista	24 March 1997 (age 29)	Resigned on 23 May 2018	Trainee (15 March 2014 – 24 January 2015); Team T (24 January 2015 – 30 November 2016); Team KIII (1 December 2016 – 1 December 2017); Trainee (1 December 2017 – 15 April 2018); Class A Academy (15 April – 23 May 2018)
Andela Yuwono	25 April 1997 (age 29)	Left on 4 September 2015	Trainee (15 March 2014 – 24 January 2015); Team T (24 January – 4 September 2015)
Anggie Putri Kurniasari	13 March 1996 (age 30)	Resigned on 23 March 2015	Trainee (15 March 2014 – 23 March 2015)
Aninditha Rahma Cahyadi	5 January 1999 (age 27)	Graduated on 29 May 2022	Trainee (15 March 2014 – 24 January 2015); Team T (24 January 2015 – 30 November 2016); Team KIII (1 December 2016 – 13 March 2021); Team T (21 July 2019 – 31 December 2019); Team J (1 January 2020 – 14 March 2021); Team T (22 August 2020 – 12 March 2021); Active member (15 March 2021 – 29 May 2022)
Ayu Safira Oktaviani	1 October 1999 (age 27)	Resigned on 23 April 2019	Trainee (15 March 2014 – 24 January 2015); Team T (24 January 2015 – 30 November 2016); Team KIII (1 December 2016 – 1 December 2017); Trainee (1 December 2017 – 15 April 2018); Class A Academy (15 April – 30 June 2018); Team T (1 July 2018 – 23 April 2019)
Chikita Ravenska Mamesah	18 March 1996 (age 30)	Graduated on 29 May 2016	Trainee (15 March 2014 – 24 January 2015); Team T (24 January 2015 – 29 May 2016)
Elaine Hartanto	3 April 1996 (age 30)	Graduated on 3 April 2016	Trainee (15 March 2014 – 24 January 2015); Team T (24 January – 31 July 2015); Team J (1 August 2015 – 3 April 2016)
Farina Yogi Devani	11 May 1999 (age 27)	Left on 1 February 2016	Trainee (15 March 2014 – 1 February 2016)
Feni Fitriyanti	16 January 1999 (age 27)	Team Passion member	Trainee (15 March 2014 – 24 January 2015); Team T (24 January 2015 – 30 November 2016); Team J (1 December 2016 – 14 March 2021); Active member (15 March 2021 – 31 March 2026); Team Passion (1 April 2026 – present)
Fransisca Saraswati Puspa Dewi	24 February 2000 (age 26)	Graduated on 2 September 2023	Trainee (15 March 2014 – 24 January 2015); Team T (24 January 2015 – 30 November 2016); Team KIII (1 December 2016 – 20 July 2019); Team J (21 July 2019 – 14 March 2021); Active member (15 March 2021 – 2 September 2023)
Indah Permata Sari	19 January 1998 (age 28)	Left on 1 February 2016	Trainee (15 March 2014 – 1 February 2016)
Kezia Putri Andinta	28 January 2001 (age 25)	Left on 22 November 2014	Trainee (15 March – 22 November 2014)
Martha Graciela	5 March 1999 (age 27)	Graduated on 22 April 2016	Trainee (15 March 2014 – 24 January 2015); Team T (24 January 2015 – 22 April 2016)
Michelle Christo Kusnadi	28 October 1999 (age 26)	Graduated on 18 January 2020	Trainee (15 March 2014 – 24 January 2015); Team T (24 January 2015 – 30 November 2016); Team J (1 December 2016 – 18 January 2020)
Milenia Christien Glory Goenawan	12 March 2000 (age 26)	Left on 22 November 2014	Trainee (15 March – 22 November 2014)
Nadhifa Salsabila	7 March 1999 (age 27)	Resigned on 16 February 2017	Trainee (15 March 2014 – 24 January 2015); Team T (24 January 2015 – 30 November 2016); Team J (1 December 2016 – 16 February 2017)
Natalia Desy Purnamasari Gunawan (written as Maria Genoveva; Natalia Desy Purnamasari Gunawan)	25 December 1996 (age 29)	Graduated on 26 December 2020	Trainee (15 March 2014 – 24 January 2015); Team T (24 January 2015 – 30 November 2016); Team KIII (1 December 2016 – 26 December 2020)
Ni Made Ayu Vania Aurellia	8 August 1999 (age 27)	Resigned on 13 December 2020	Trainee (15 March 2014 – 24 January 2015); Team T (24 January 2015 – 30 November 2016); Team KIII (1 December 2016 – 20 July 2019); Team J (21 July 2019 – 13 December 2020)
Nina Hamidah	2 March 2000 (age 26)	Left on 1 February 2016	Trainee (15 March 2014 – 31 July 2015); Team T (1 August 2015 – 1 February 2016)
Pipit Ananda	6 February 1998 (age 28)	Resigned on 24 March 2014	Trainee (15–24 March 2014)
Putri Farin Kartika	5 September 1996 (age 30)	Left on 1 February 2016	Trainee (15 March 2014 – 1 February 2016)
Rizka Khalila	19 February 1999 (age 27)	Resigned on 23 March 2015	Trainee (15 March 2014 – 23 March 2015)
Shafa Nabila Kaleb	6 March 1998 (age 28)	Resigned on 11 August 2014	Trainee (15 March – 11 August 2014)
Shani Indira Natio	5 October 1998 (age 28)	Graduated on 11 May 2024; Vice General Manager of JKT48 Theater (11 May 2024 – present)	Trainee (15 March 2014 – 24 January 2015); Team T (24 January 2015 – 30 November 2016); Team KIII (1 December 2016 – 13 March 2021); Active member (14 March 2021 – 11 May 2024)
Shania Gracia	31 August 1999 (age 27)	Graduated on 27 December 2025	Trainee (15 March 2014 – 24 January 2015); Team T (24 January 2015 – 30 November 2016); Team KIII (1 December 2016 – 13 March 2021); Active member (14 March 2021 – 27 December 2025)
Sofia Meifaliani	23 April 1998 (age 28)	Graduated on 27 April 2016	Trainee (15 March 2014 – 31 July 2015); Team J (1 August 2015 – 27 April 2016)
Stephanie Pricilla Indarto Putri	19 November 2000 (age 25)	Graduated on 28 September 2019	Trainee (15 March 2014 – 31 July 2015); Team T (1 August 2015 – 30 November 2016); Team KIII (1 December 2016 – 31 January 2018); Team J (1 February 2018 – 12 April 2019); Class A Academy (12 April – 10 September 2019); Team KIII (10–28 September 2019)
Syahfira Angela Nurhaliza	20 December 2000 (age 25)	Graduated on 13 December 2019	Trainee (15 March 2014 – 24 January 2015); Team T (24 January 2015 – 30 November 2016); Team J (1 December 2016 – 30 June 2018); Team T (1 July 2018 – 13 December 2019)
Triarona Kusuma	6 December 1996 (age 29)	Left on 1 February 2016	Trainee (15 March 2014 – 1 February 2016)
Yansen Indiani	15 June 1999 (age 27)	Left on 2 March 2017	Trainee (15 March 2014 – 31 July 2015); Team T (1 August 2015 – 30 November 2016); Team J (1 December 2016 – 2 March 2017)
Zebi Magnolia Fawwaz	10 November 2000 (age 25)	Contract terminated on 26 December 2014	Trainee (15 March – 26 December 2014)

=== Fourth generation ===
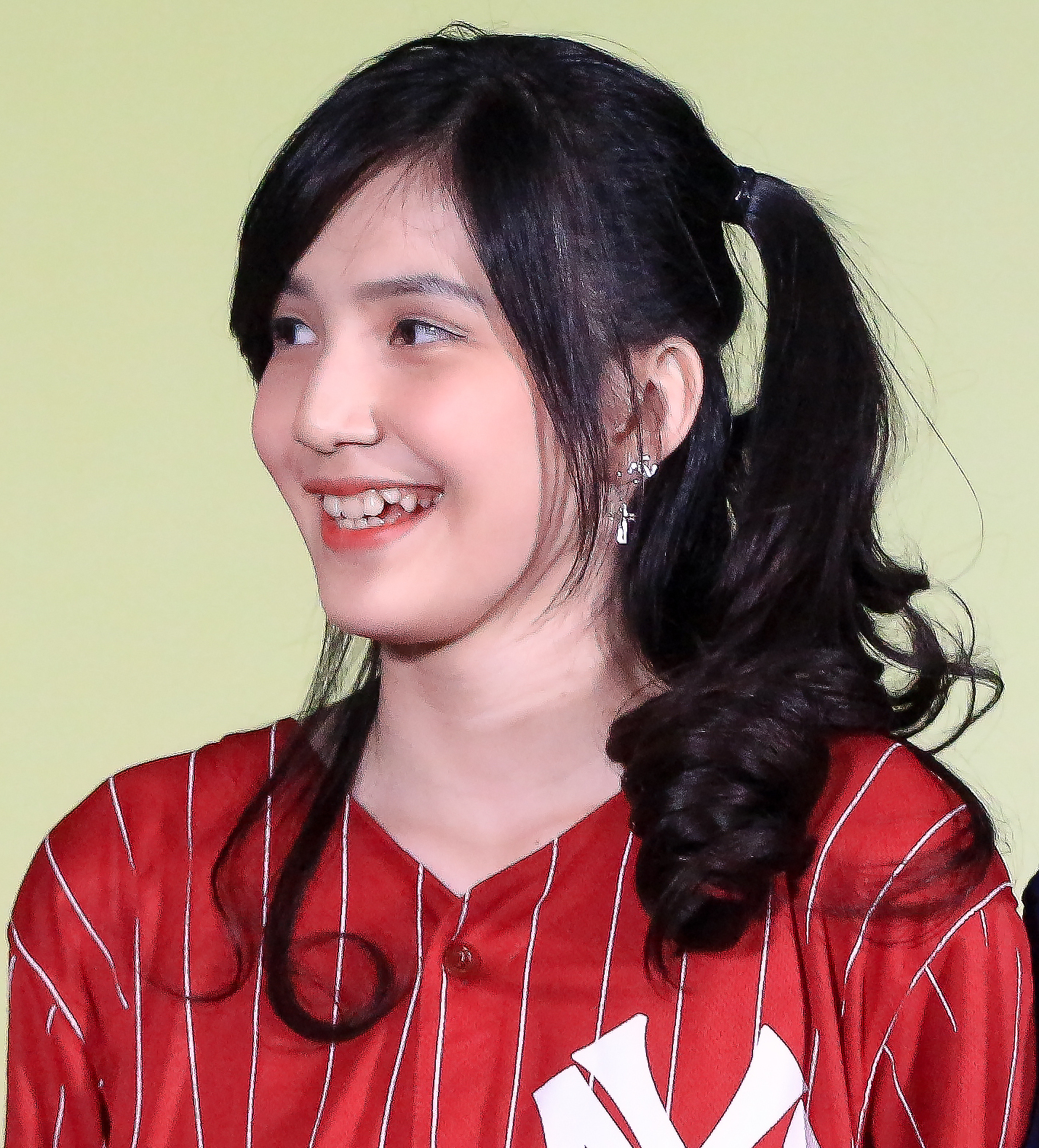
Christy Chriselle

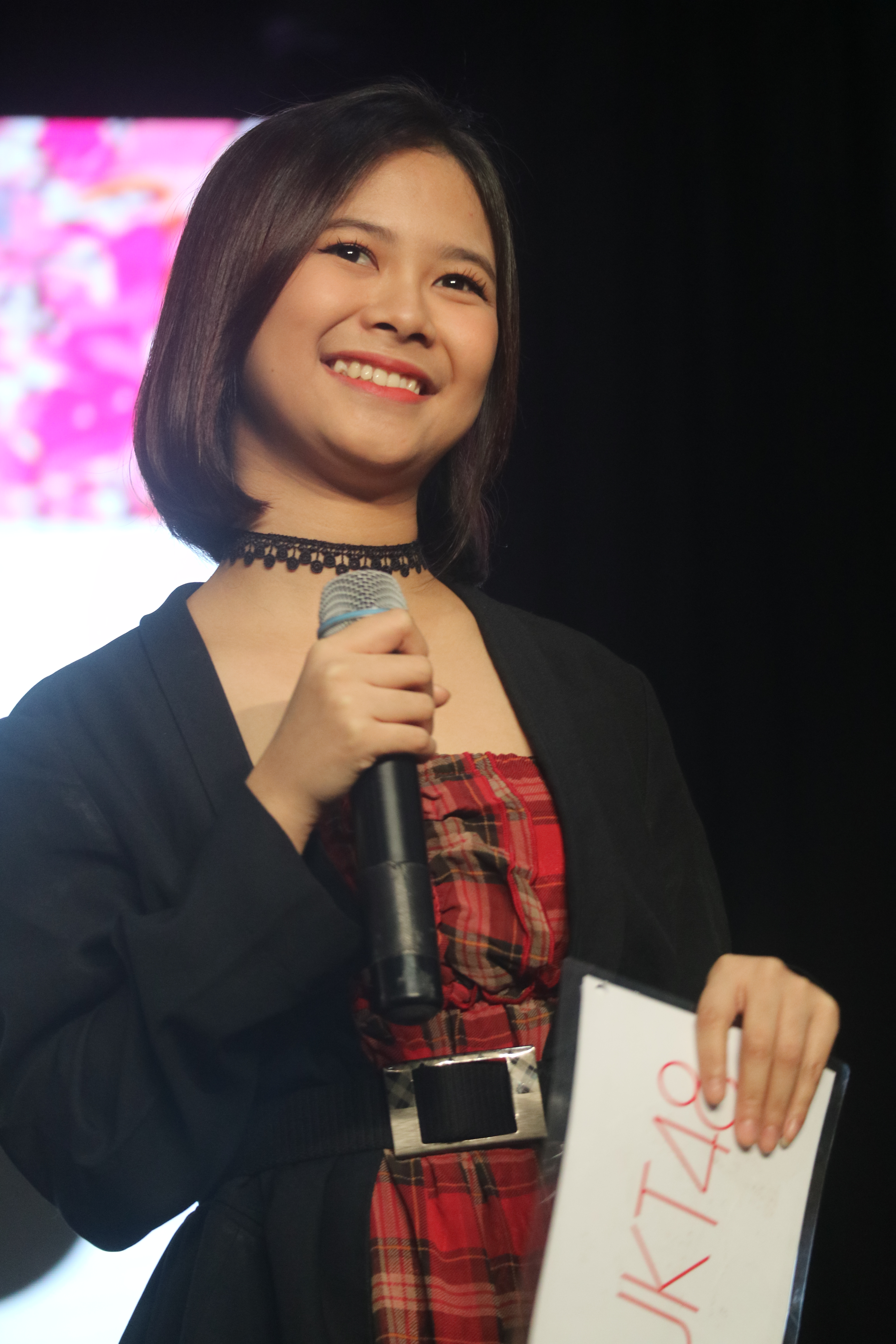
Fidly Immanda Azzahra

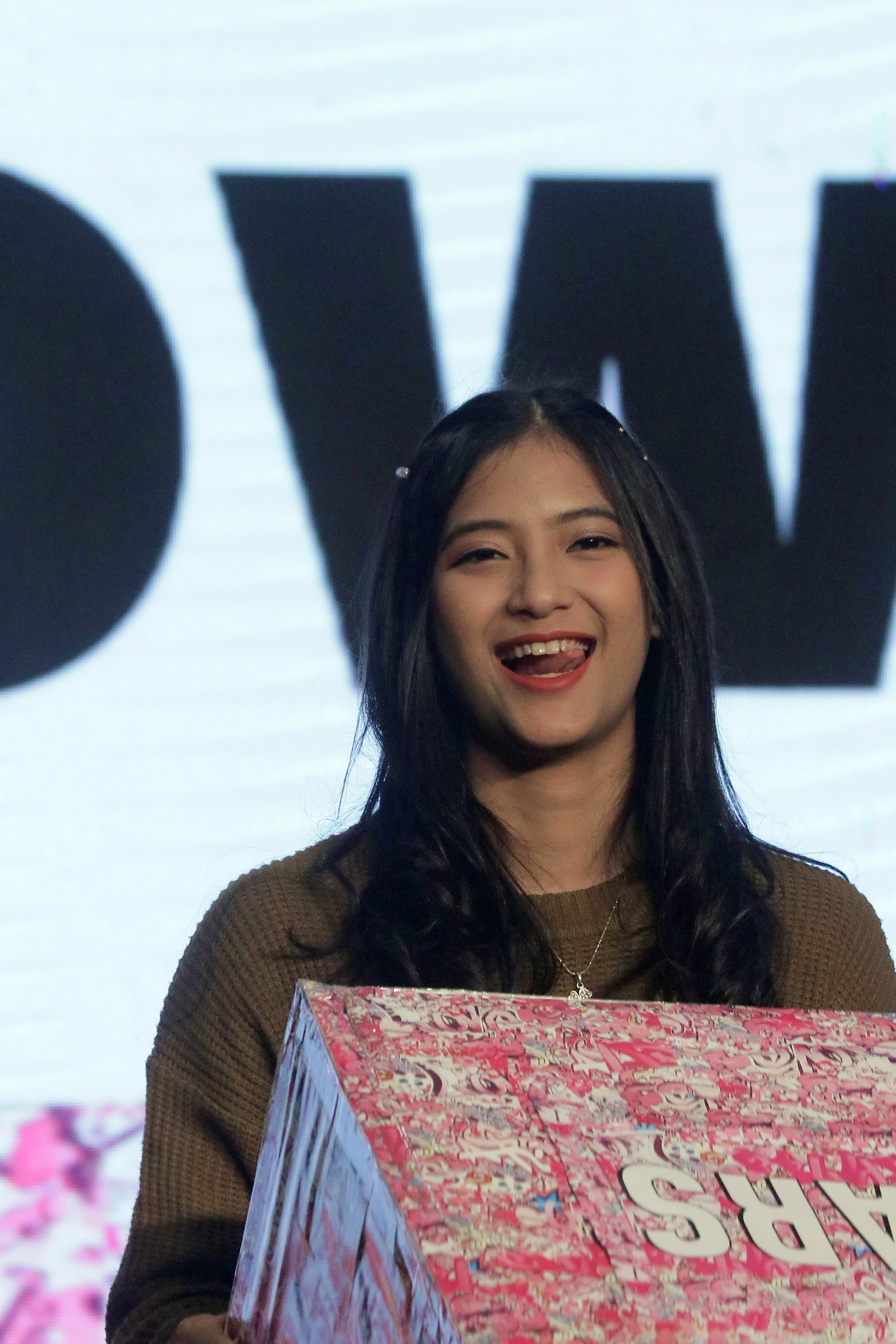
Jinan Safa Safira

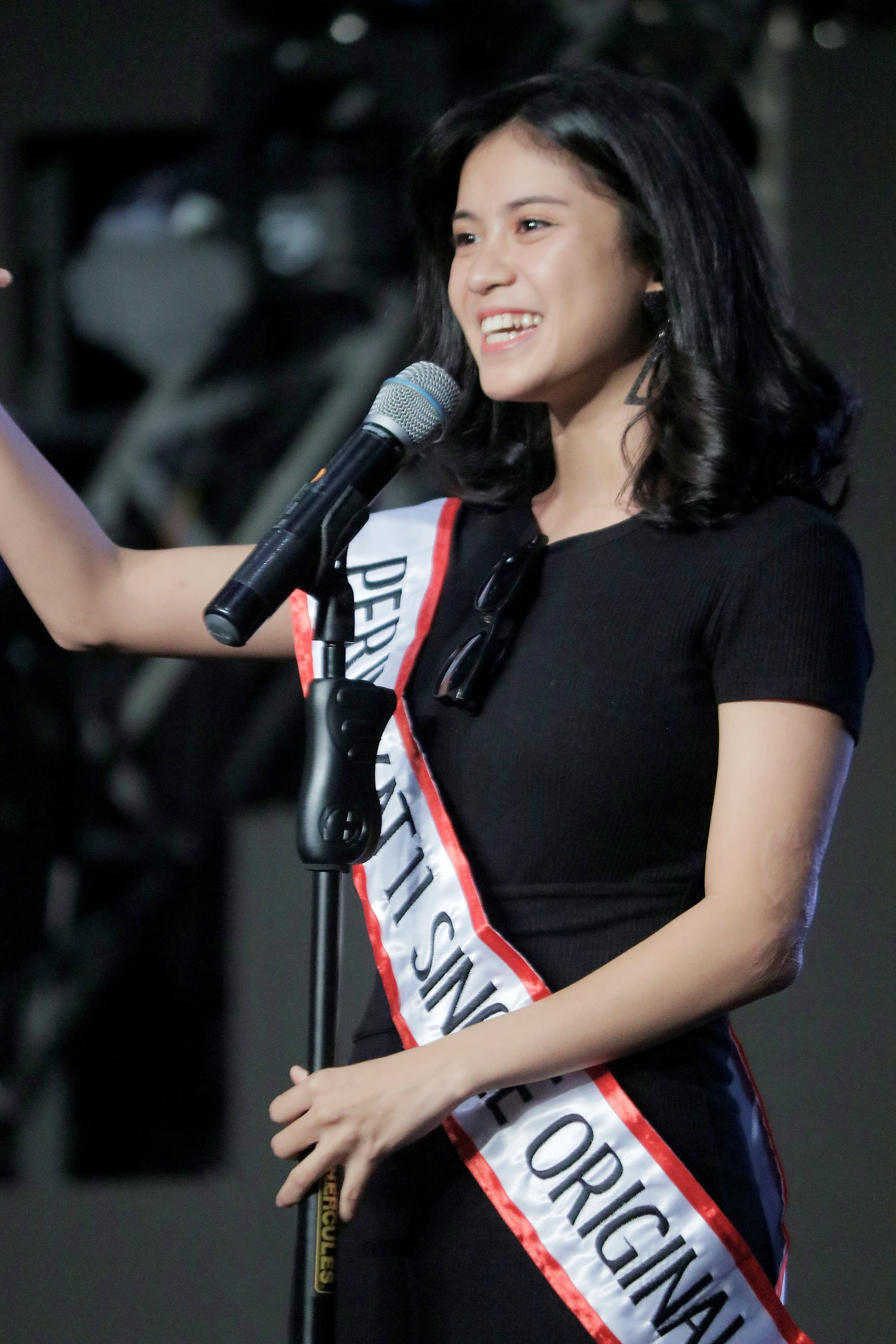
Melati Putri Rahel Sesilia

Twelve candidates for trainees from this generation were announced on 16 May 2015 during the Pareo wa Emerald Handshake Festival. From those, ten would eventually promoted as trainees on 31 October 2015.

Tan Zhi Hui Celine became the first Malaysian national to be a JKT48 member and also the first member who is neither Indonesian nor Japanese, albeit she is half-Indonesian by blood.

Upon Jinan Safa Safira's graduation on 18 March 2023, the fourth generation became the fourth to fully graduate from the group.

Name	Birth date	Status	Membership history
Adriani Elisabeth	10 May 2000 (age 26)	Graduated on 14 March 2021	Trainee Candidate (16 May – 31 October 2015); Trainee (31 October 2015 – 30 November 2016); Team T (1 December 2016 – 31 December 2019); Team J (1 January 2020 – 14 March 2021)
Christy Chriselle	14 November 1999 (age 26)	Graduated on 21 October 2017	Trainee Candidate (16 May – 31 October 2015); Trainee (31 October 2015 – 30 November 2016); Team T (1 December 2016 – 21 October 2017)
Cindy Hapsari Maharani; Pujiantoro Putri	13 September 1998 (age 28)	Graduated on 17 July 2022	Trainee Candidate (16 May – 31 October 2015); Trainee (31 October 2015 – 30 November 2016); Team T (1 December 2016 – 31 January 2018); Team J (1 February 2018 – 14 March 2021); Active member (15 March 2021 – 17 July 2022)
Fidly Immanda Azzahra	19 March 2001 (age 25)	Graduated on 13 March 2021	Trainee Candidate (16 May – 31 October 2015); Trainee (31 October 2015 – 30 November 2016); Team T (1 December 2016 – 31 December 2019); Team KIII (1 January 2020 – 13 March 2021)
Jessica Berliana Ekawardani	4 July 1999 (age 27)	Left on 31 October 2015 (Note: Never officially announced, left out from promotion on said date and profile got erased. As of 6 September 2015, she was still in the group.)	Trainee Candidate (16 May – 31 October 2015)
Jinan Safa Safira	8 June 1999 (age 27)	Graduated on 18 March 2023	Trainee Candidate (16 May – 31 October 2015); Trainee (31 October 2015 – 30 November 2016); Team T (1 December 2016 – 31 December 2019); Team KIII (1 January 2020 – 13 March 2021); Active member (14 March 2021 – 18 March 2023)
Made Devi Ranita Ningtara	18 November 2000 (age 25)	Graduated on 27 December 2018	Trainee Candidate (16 May – 31 October 2015); Trainee (31 October 2015 – 30 November 2016); Team T (1 December 2016 – 27 December 2018)
Mega Suryani	9 July 2002 (age 24)	Left on 31 October 2015	Trainee Candidate (16 May – 31 October 2015)
Melati Putri Rahel Sesilia	1 January 2000 (age 26)	Graduated on 24 October 2020	Trainee Candidate (16 May – 31 October 2015); Trainee (31 October 2015 – 30 November 2016); Team T (1 December 2016 – 31 December 2019); Team J (1 January – 24 October 2020)
Sri Lintang Wulan Lisdiyanti	5 November 2000 (age 25)	Resigned on 7 December 2017	Trainee Candidate (16 May – 31 October 2015); Trainee (31 October 2015 – 30 November 2016); Team T (1 December 2016 – 4 March 2017); Team J (4 March – 7 December 2017)
(Malaysia) Tan Zhi Hui Celine	21 August 2001 (age 25)	Graduated on 13 August 2022	Trainee Candidate (16 May – 31 October 2015); Trainee (31 October 2015 – 30 November 2016); Team T (1 December 2016 – 31 December 2019); Team J (1 January – 21 August 2020); Team T (22 August 2020 – 12 March 2021); Active member (13 March 2021 – 13 August 2022)
Zahra Yuriva Dermawan	10 July 2000 (age 26)	Resigned on 10 February 2018	Trainee Candidate (16 May – 31 October 2015); Trainee (31 October 2015 – 30 November 2016); Team T (1 December 2016 – 4 March 2017); Team J (4 March 2017 – 10 February 2018)

=== Fifth generation ===
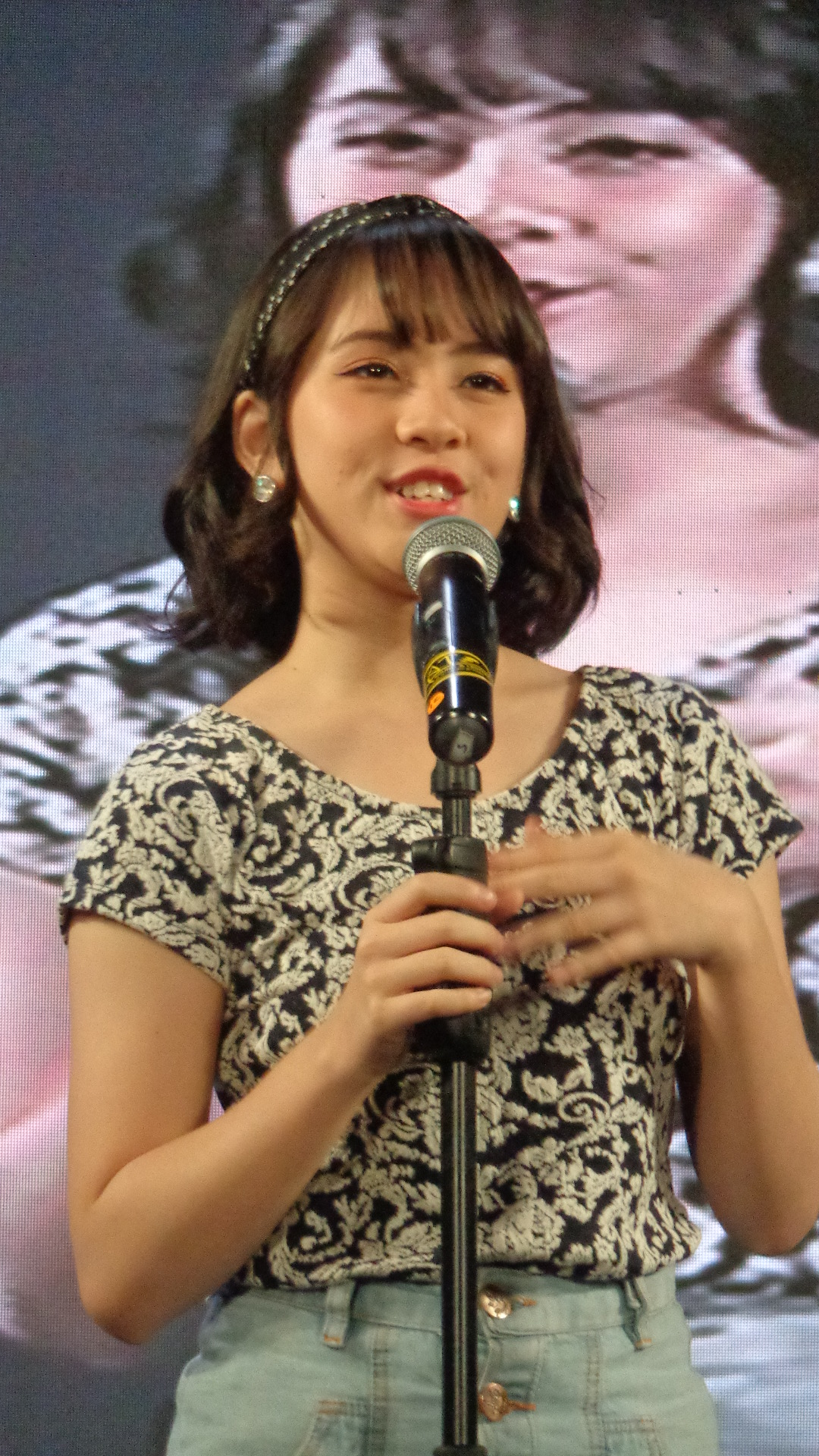
Adhisty Zara S. Kusumawardhani

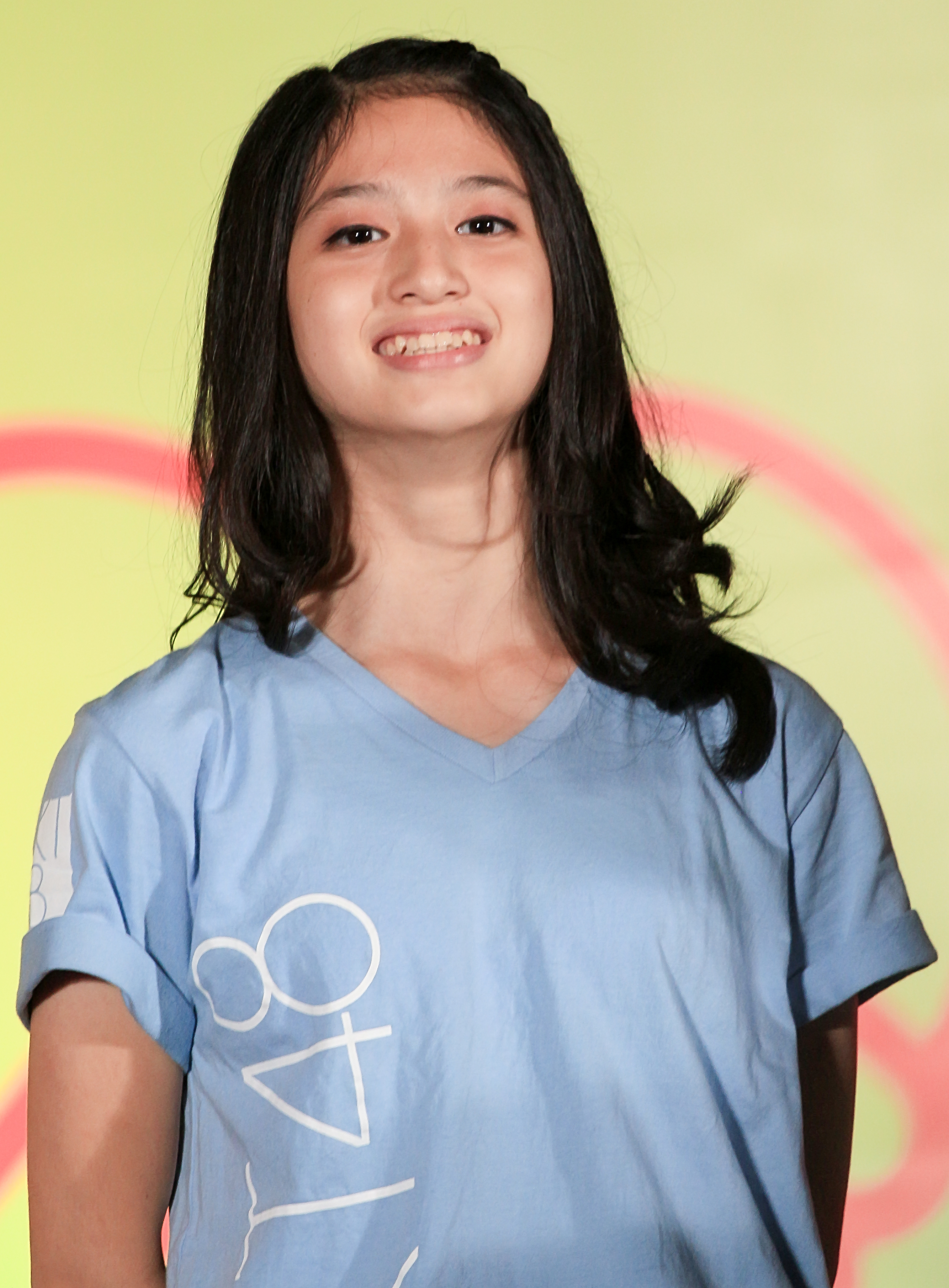
Eve A. Ichwan

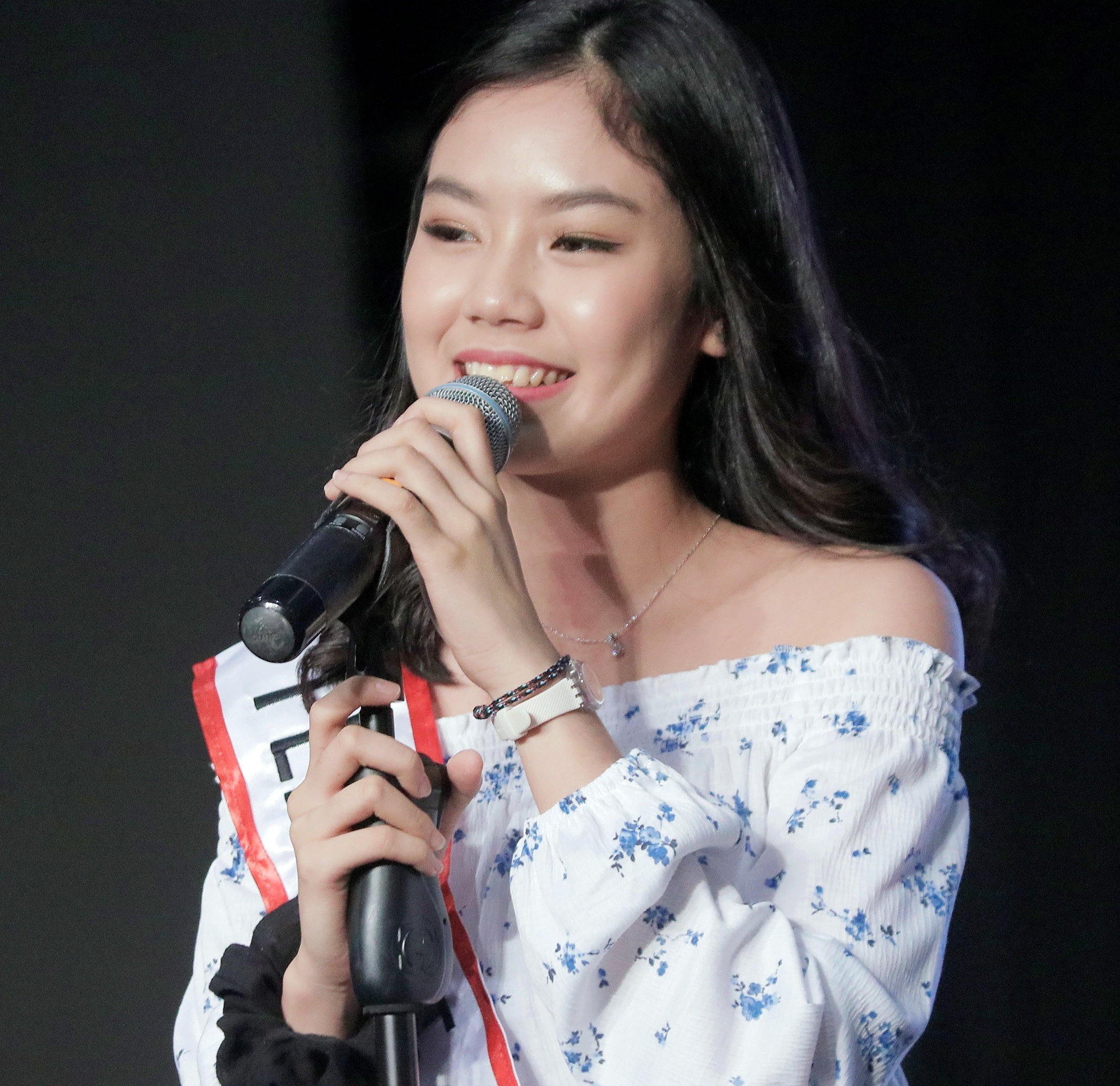
Gabryela Marcelina Djaja

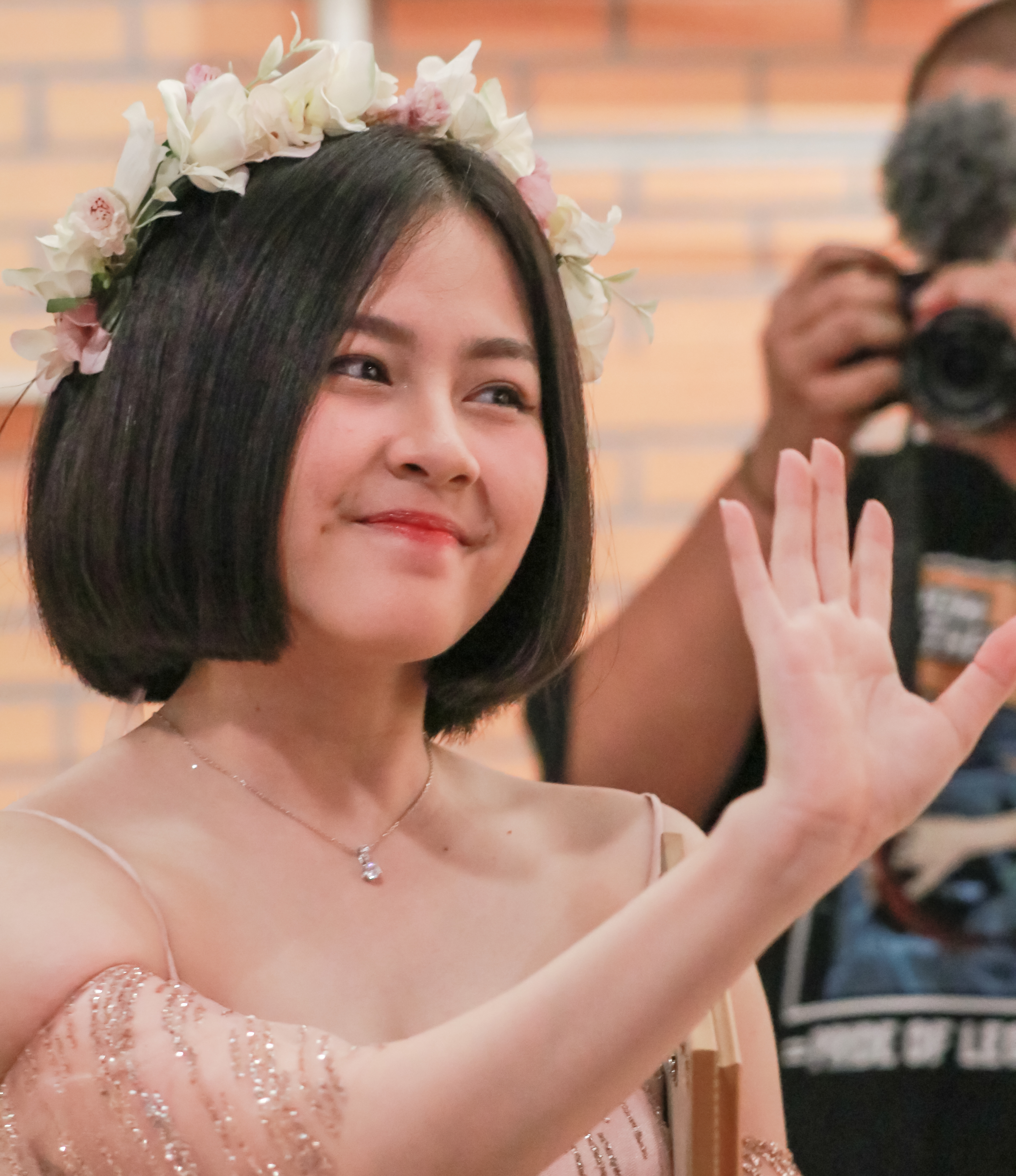
Hasyakyla Utami Kusumawardhani

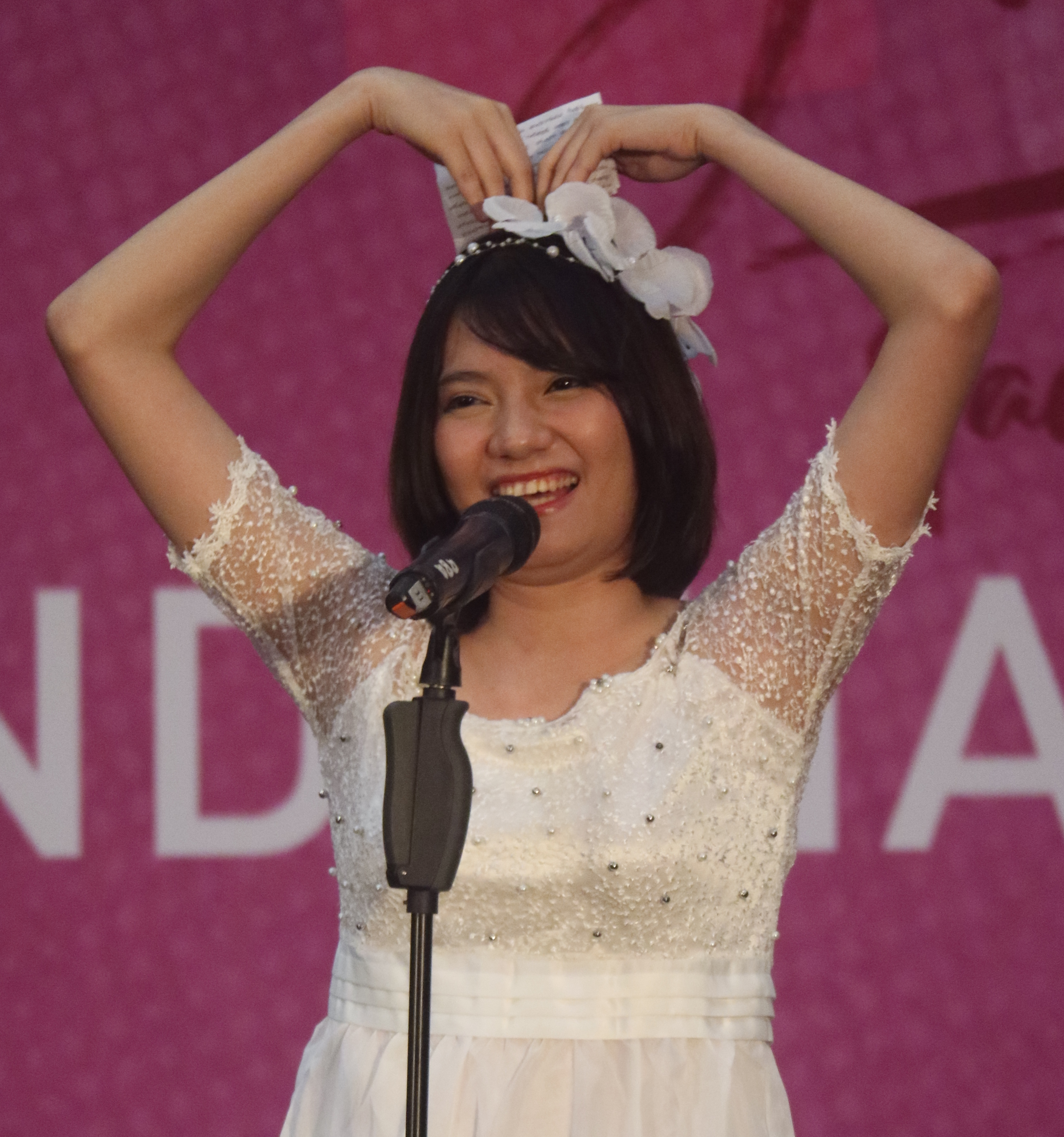
Ruth Damayanti Sitanggang

Seventeen candidates for trainees from this generation were announced on 28 May 2016 during the Mahagita Handshake Festival in Jakarta. Eight of them were directly promoted as Team T members while six were promoted as trainees on 11 September 2016 during a grand shuffle. The shuffled configuration was effective from 1 December 2016. This is, as of 27 October 2026, the earliest and only fully graduated generation never to have any of its members as captain or vice-captain in any level.

Upon Eve Antoinette Ichwan's graduation on 13 February 2022, this generation became the second batch to fully graduate from the group.

Name	Birth date	Status	Membership history
Adhisty Zara Sundari Kusumawardhani	21 June 2003 (age 23)	Graduated on 4 December 2019	Trainee Candidate (28 May – 30 November 2016); Team T (1 December 2016 – 4 December 2019)
Anggita Destiana Dewi	26 December 2001 (age 24)	Left on 27 June 2016	Trainee Candidate (28 May – 27 June 2016)
Chintya Hanindhitakirana Wirawan	29 December 1999 (age 26)	Resigned on 16 February 2017	Trainee Candidate (28 May – 30 November 2016); Trainee (1 December 2016 – 16 February 2017)
Citra Ayu Pranajaya Wibrado	25 August 1999 (age 27)	Resigned on 30 June 2018	Trainee Candidate (28 May – 30 November 2016); Trainee (1 December 2016 – 4 March 2017); Team T (4 March 2017 – 30 June 2018)
Diani Amalia Ramadhani	5 January 1999 (age 27)	Graduated on 14 March 2021	Trainee Candidate (28 May – 30 November 2016); Trainee (1 December 2016 – 15 April 2018); Class A Academy (15 April – 30 September 2018); Team J (1 October 2018 – 14 March 2021)
Elizabeth Gloria Setiawan	14 February 2002 (age 24)	Resigned on 13 April 2018	Trainee Candidate (28 May – 30 November 2016); Team T (1 December 2016 – 13 April 2018)
Eve Antoinette Ichwan	17 October 2003 (age 23)	Graduated on 13 February 2022	Trainee Candidate (28 May – 30 November 2016); Team T (1 December 2016 – 7 November 2018); Class A Academy (7 November 2018 – 7 April 2019); Team J (8 April 2019 – 14 March 2021); Active member (15 March 2021 – 13 February 2022)
Gabryela Marcelina Djaja	6 September 2001 (age 25)	Dismissed on 16 November 2020	Trainee Candidate (28 May – 30 November 2016); Trainee (1 December 2016 – 15 April 2018); Class A Academy (15 April – 22 December 2018); Team T (22 December 2018 – 31 December 2019); Team KIII (1 January – 16 November 2020)
Hasyakyla Utami Kusumawardhani	20 May 2002 (age 24)	Graduated on 10 November 2019	Trainee Candidate (28 May – 30 November 2016); Trainee (1 December 2016 – 31 January 2018); Team T (1 February 2018 – 10 November 2019)
Helma Sonya	20 March 1999 (age 27)	Left on 9 September 2016	Trainee Candidate (28 May – 9 September 2016)
Nurhayati	18 October 1997 (age 29)	Graduated on 13 March 2021	Trainee Candidate (28 May – 30 November 2016); Team T (1 December 2016 – 31 January 2018); Team J (1 February 2018 – 20 July 2019); Team KIII (21 July 2019 – 13 March 2021)
Puti Nadhira Azalia	7 June 2000 (age 26)	Graduated on 18 May 2020	Trainee Candidate (28 May – 30 November 2016); Team T (1 December 2016 – 31 December 2019); Team KIII (1 January – 18 May 2020)
Regina Angelina	9 May 2001 (age 25)	Dismissed on 1 November 2017	Trainee Candidate (28 May – 30 November 2016); Team T (1 December 2016 – 1 November 2017)
Rissanda Putri Tuarissa	4 August 1999 (age 27)	Left on 9 September 2016	Trainee Candidate (28 May – 9 September 2016)
Ruth Damayanti Sitanggang	12 November 1998 (age 27)	Resigned on 30 June 2018	Trainee Candidate (28 May – 30 November 2016); Team T (1 December 2016 – 30 June 2018)
Sania Julia Montolalu	18 July 2001 (age 25)	Graduated on 14 March 2021	Trainee Candidate (28 May – 30 November 2016); Trainee (1 December 2016 – 15 April 2018); Class A Academy (15 April – 30 June 2018); Team J (1 July 2018 – 14 March 2021)
Violeta Burhan	4 January 2002 (age 24)	Left on 3 July 2018	Trainee Candidate (28 May – 30 November 2016); Team T (1 December 2016 – 3 July 2018)

=== Sixth generation ===
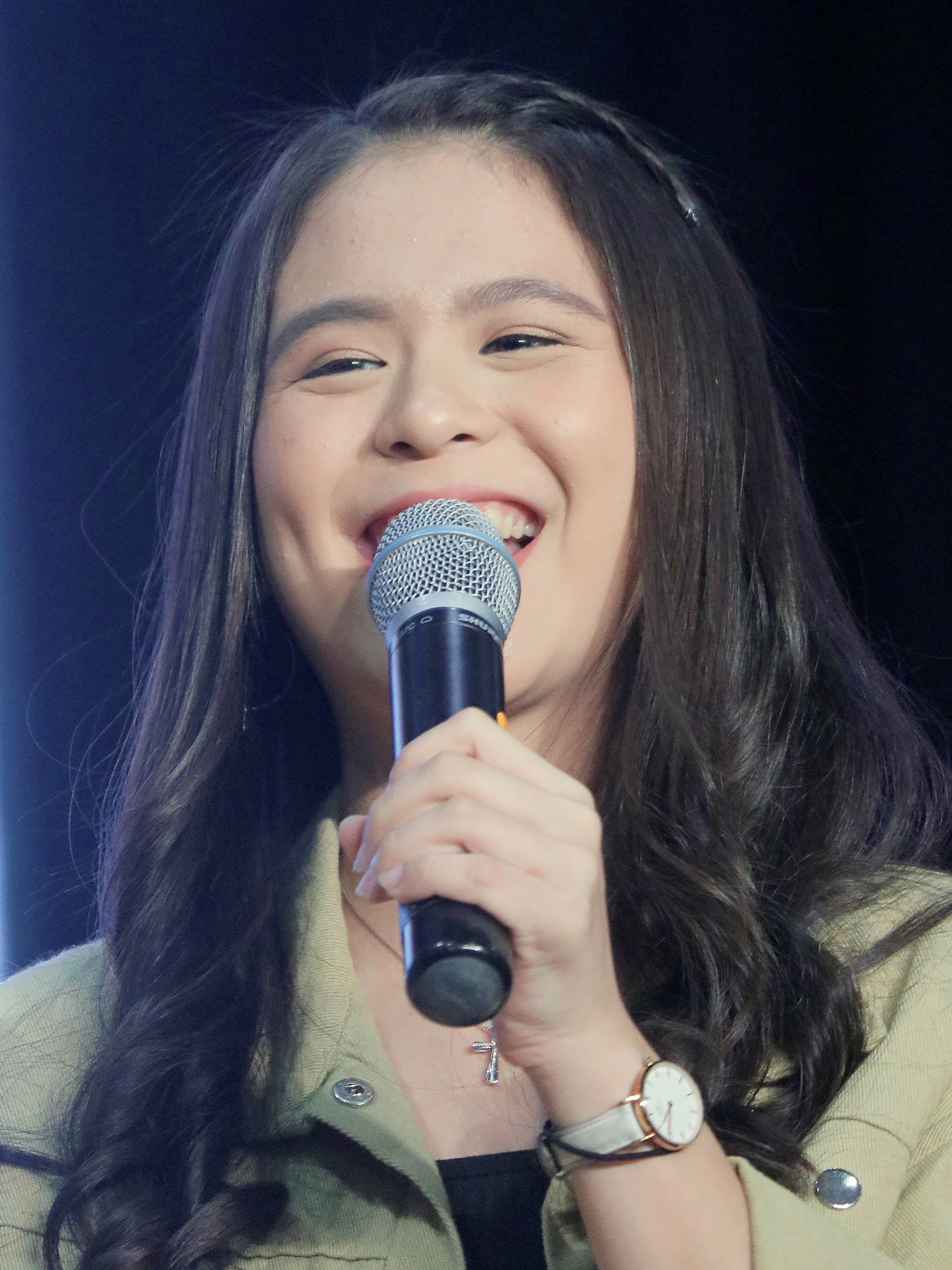
Ariella C. Ichwan

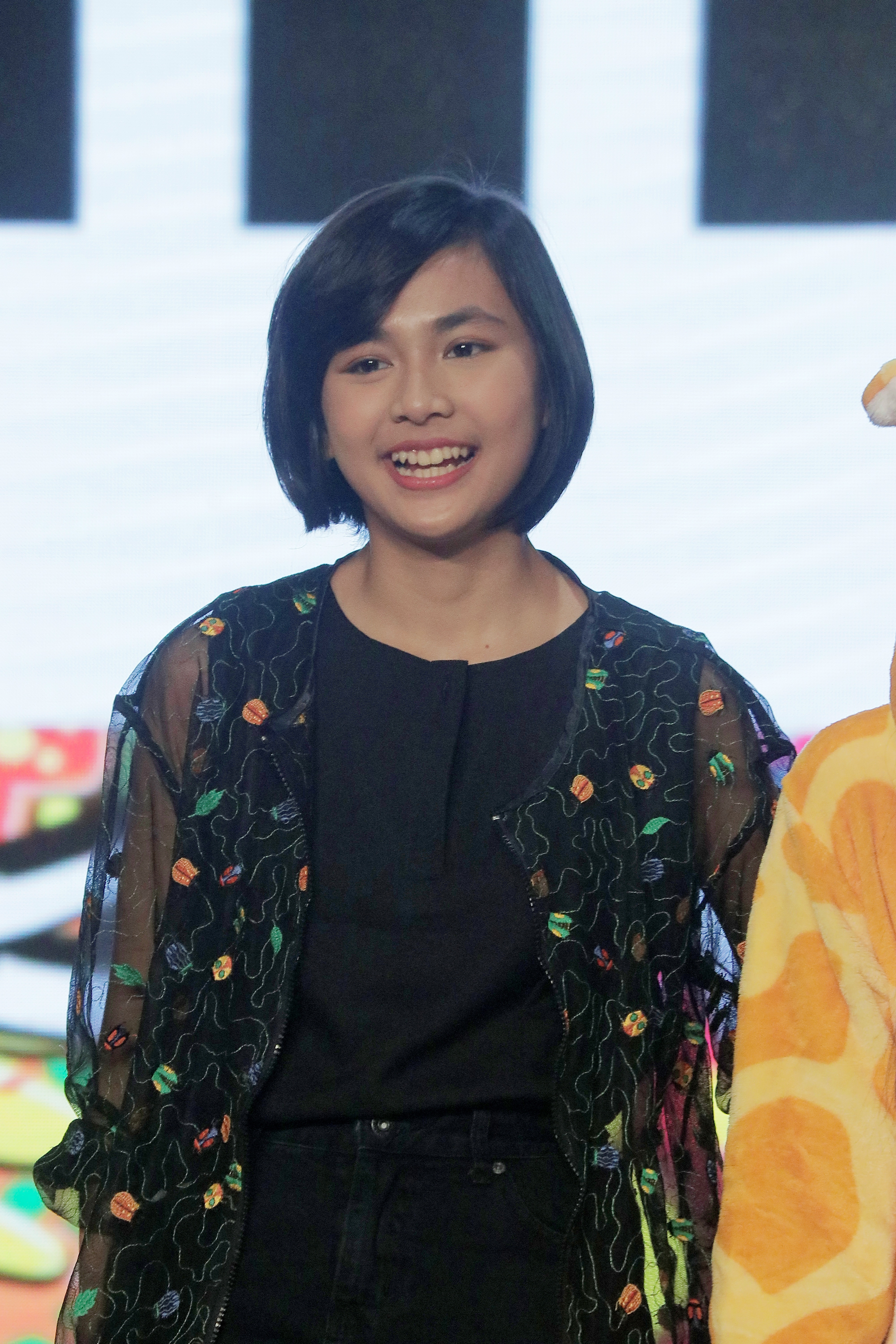
Gita Sekar A.

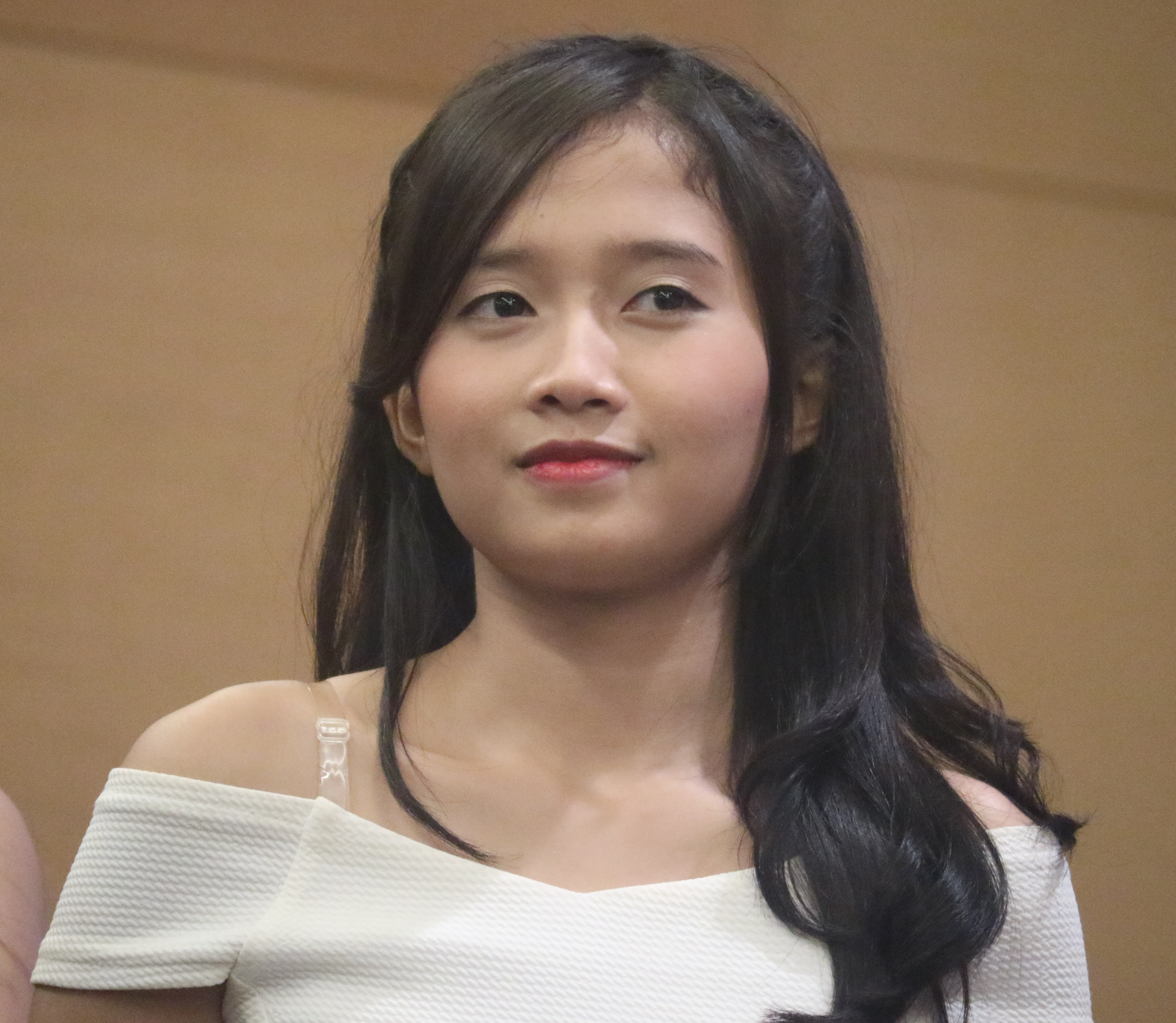
Putri C. A.

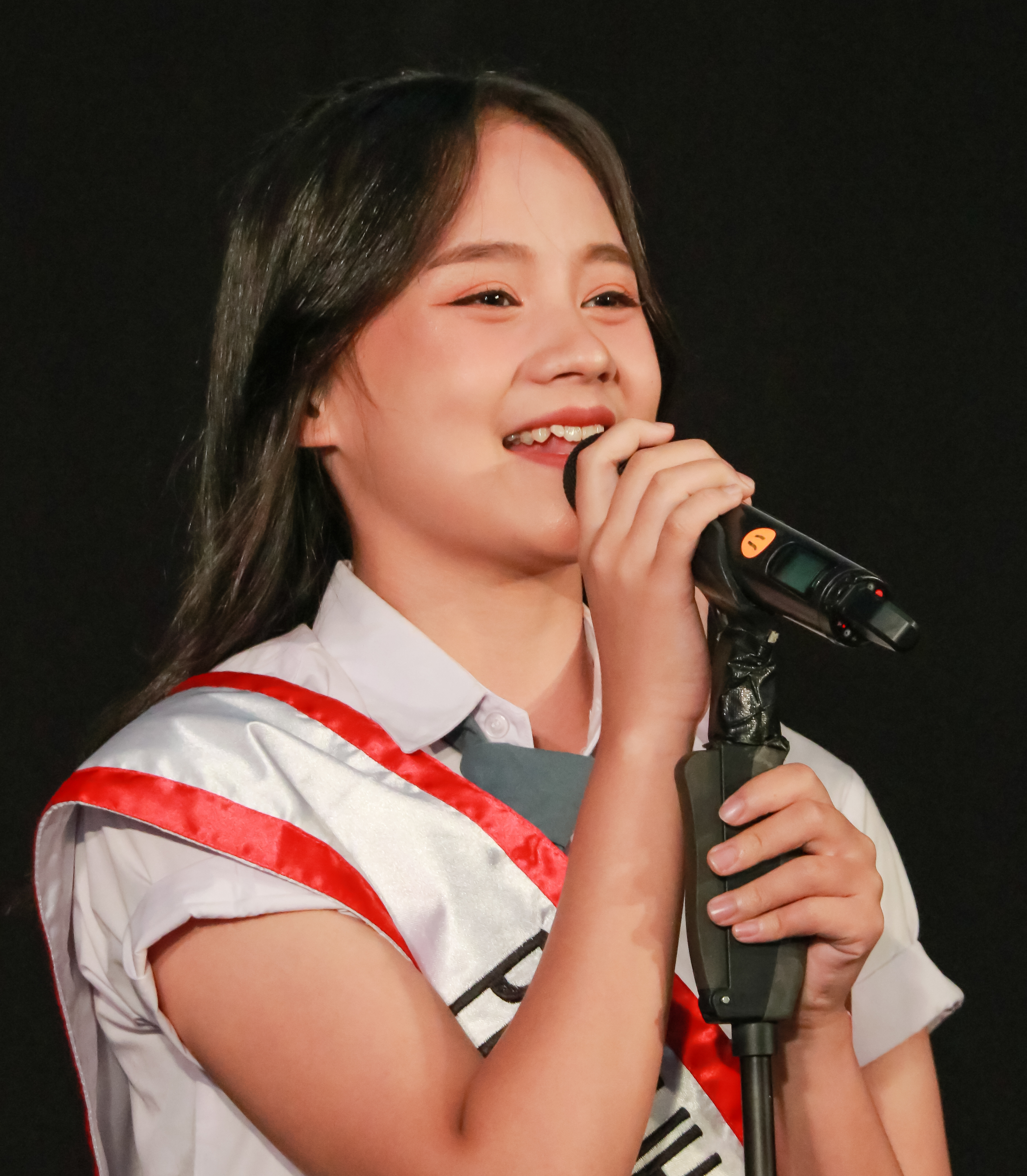
Rinanda S.

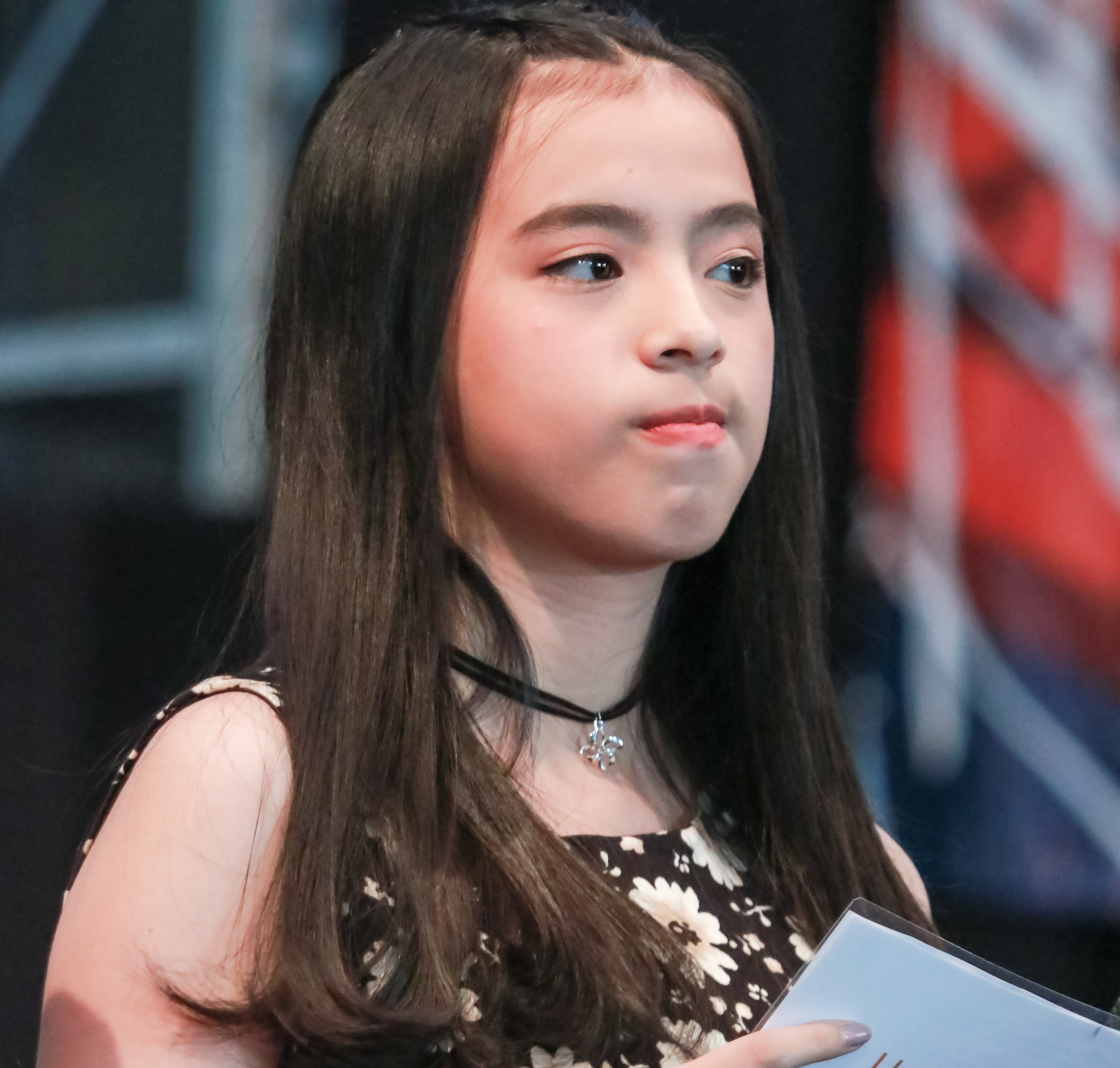
Shalza Grasita

Fourteen recruits from this generation were introduced on 8 April 2018 during a dedicated announcement event in the JKT48 Theater. They went straight into the newly-established JKT48 Academy as the Class B Academy members.

Name	Birth date	Status	Membership history
Amanda Priscella Solichin	20 August 2003 (age 23)	Resigned on 12 December 2018	Class B Academy (8 April – 10 June 2018); Class A Academy (10 June – 12 December 2018)
Anastasya Narwastu; Tety Handuran	16 June 2000 (age 26)	Graduated on 13 March 2021	Class B Academy (8 April – 10 June 2018); Class A Academy (10 June 2018 – 20 July 2019); Team KIII (21 July 2019 – 13 March 2021)
Ariella Calista Ichwan	12 May 2000 (age 26)	Graduated on 13 February 2022	Class B Academy (8 April – 10 June 2018); Class A Academy (10 June – 30 September 2018); Team J (1 October 2018 – 14 March 2021); Active member (15 March 2021 – 13 February 2022)
Denise Caroline	23 December 2001 (age 24)	Resigned on 21 August 2018	Class B Academy (8 April – 10 June 2018); Class A Academy (10 June – 21 August 2018)
Erika Ebisawa Kuswan	15 October 1999 (age 27)	Resigned on 9 February 2019	Class B Academy (8 April – 10 June 2018); Class A Academy (10 June – 27 October 2018); Team KIII (28 October 2018 – 9 February 2019)
Erika Sintia	16 April 2000 (age 26)	Left on 24 January 2019	Class B Academy (8 April – 10 June 2018); Class A Academy (10 June 2018 – 24 January 2019)
Gita Sekar Andarini	30 June 2001 (age 25)	Team Dream member	Class B Academy (8 April 2018 – 12 August 2018); Class A Academy (12 August 2018 – 20 July 2019); Team KIII (21 July 2019 – 13 March 2021); Active member (14 March 2021 – 31 March 2026); Team Dream (1 April 2026 – present)
Graciella Ruth Wiranto	5 March 2004 (age 22)	Resigned on 15 June 2019	Class B Academy (8 April – 10 June 2018); Class A Academy (10 June 2018 – 15 June 2019)
Jihan Miftahul Jannah	13 January 2001 (age 25)	Resigned on 21 April 2018	Class B Academy (8–21 April 2018)
Kandiya Rafa Maulidita	14 May 2003 (age 23)	Graduated on 13 March 2021	Class B Academy (8 April – 10 June 2018); Class A Academy (10 June – 30 December 2018); Team KIII (30 December 2018 – 13 March 2021)
Putri Cahyaning Anggraini	25 December 2001 (age 24)	Dismissed on 1 November 2018	Class B Academy (8 April – 10 June 2018); Class A Academy (10 June – 1 November 2018)
Rinanda Syahputri	13 September 2003 (age 23)	Graduated on 13 March 2021	Class B Academy (8 April – 10 June 2018); Class A Academy (10 June – 30 September 2018); Team T (1 October 2018 – 31 December 2019); Team KIII (1 January 2020 – 13 March 2021)
Riska Amelia Putri	18 March 2000 (age 26)	Graduated on 14 March 2021	Class B Academy (8 April – 10 June 2018); Class A Academy (10 June 2018 – 7 April 2019); Team J (8 April 2019 – 14 March 2021)
Shalza Grasita	7 October 2004 (age 22)	Dismissed on 22 September 2020	Class B Academy (8 April – 10 June 2018); Class A Academy (10 June 2018 – 22 September 2020)

=== Seventh generation ===
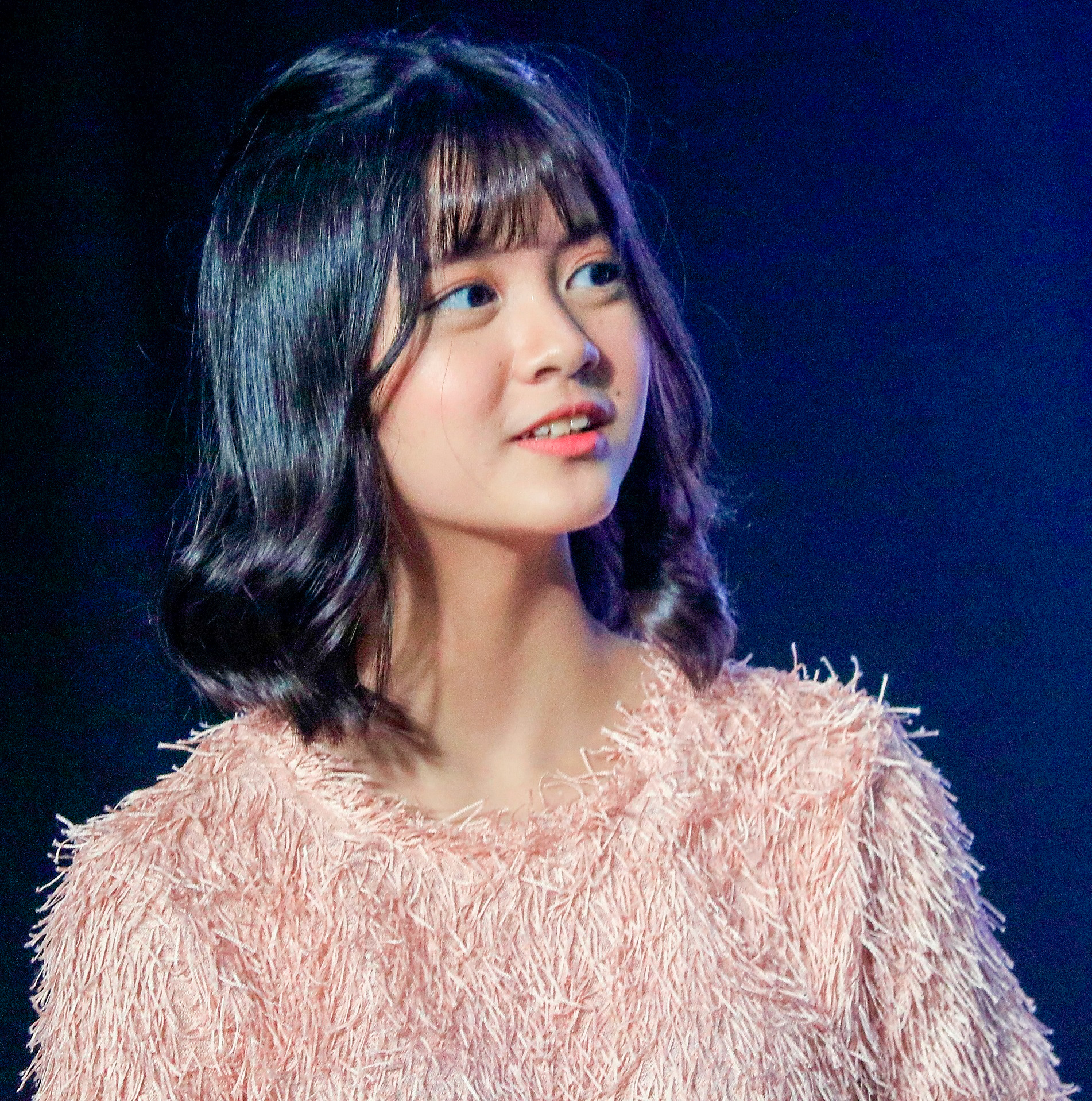
Angelina Christy

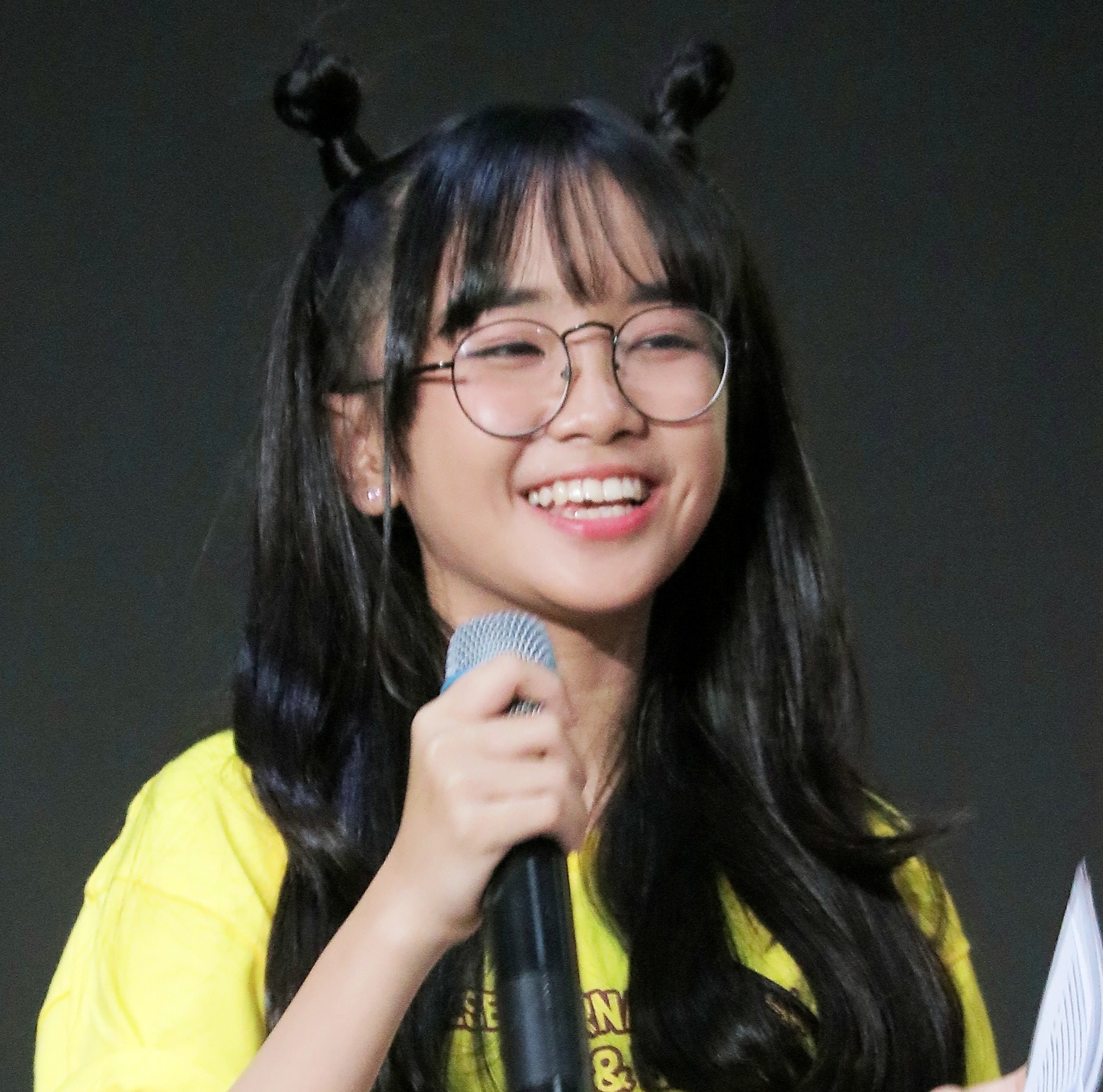
Aurel Mayori Putri

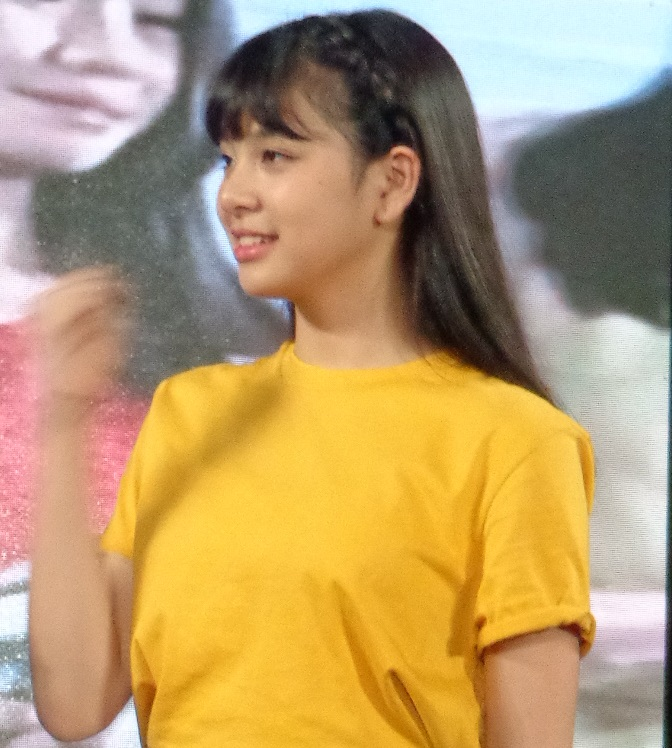
Azizi S. A.

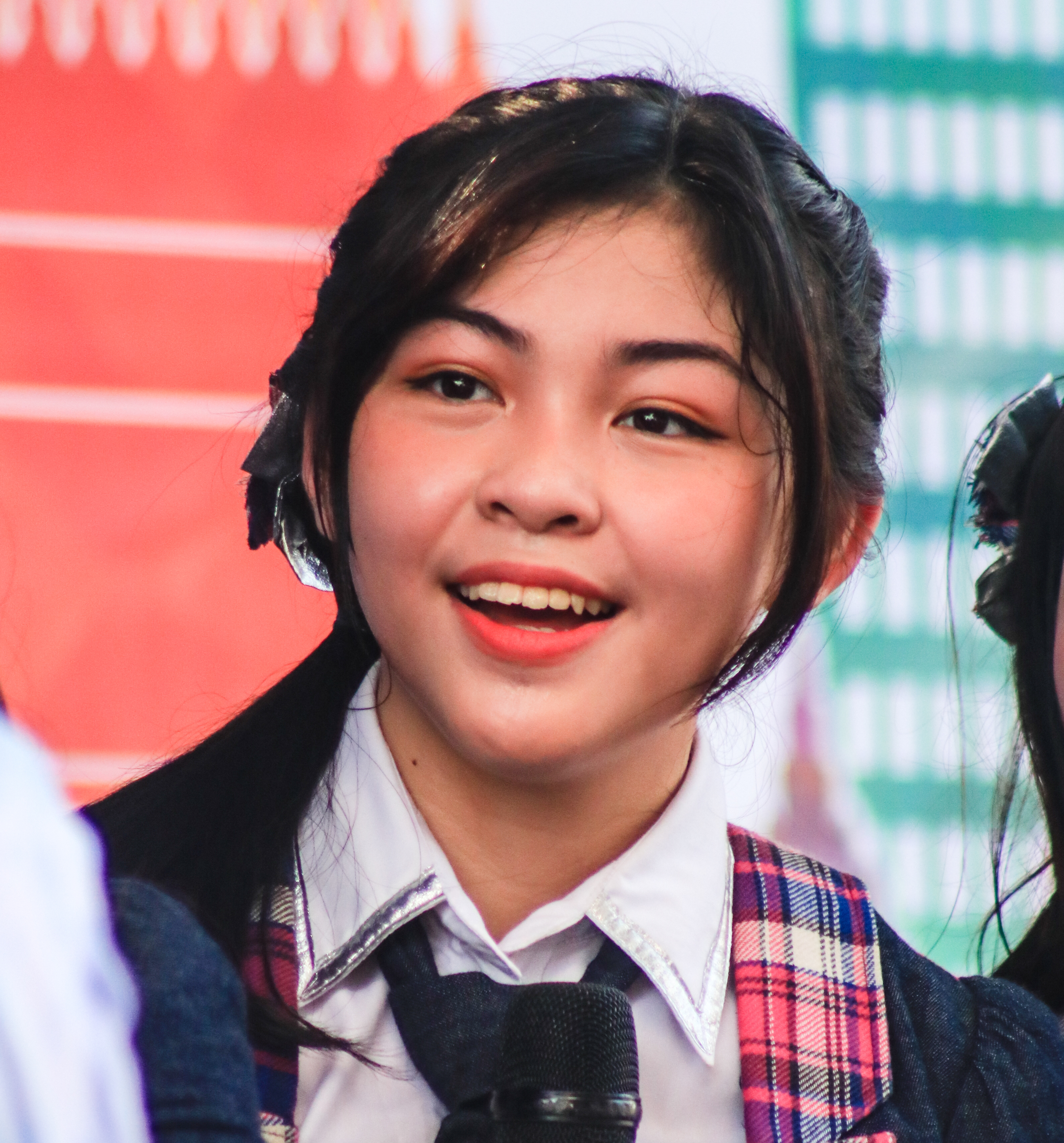
Gabriel A. Laeman

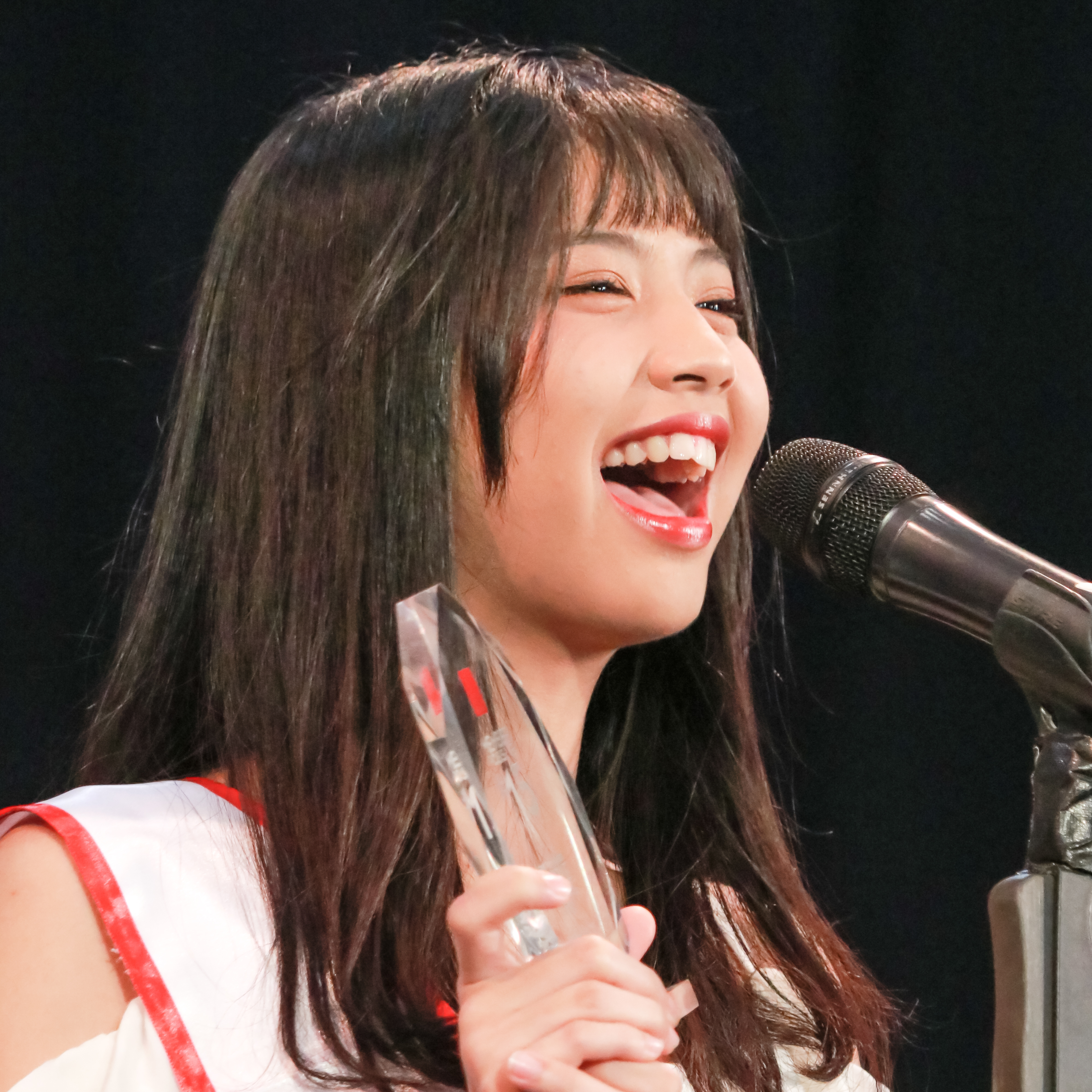
Helisma M. P. K.

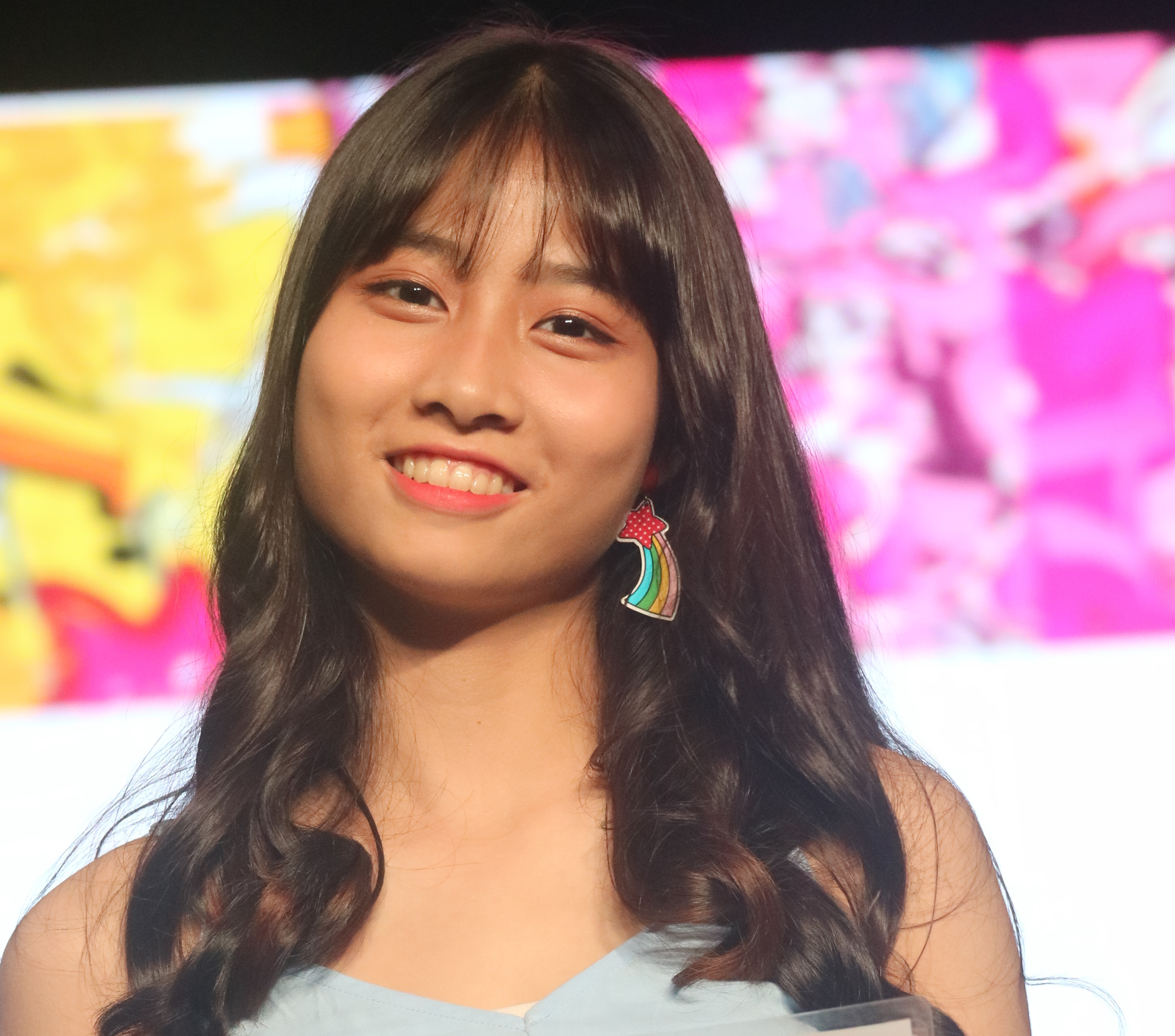
Mutiara A. Umandana

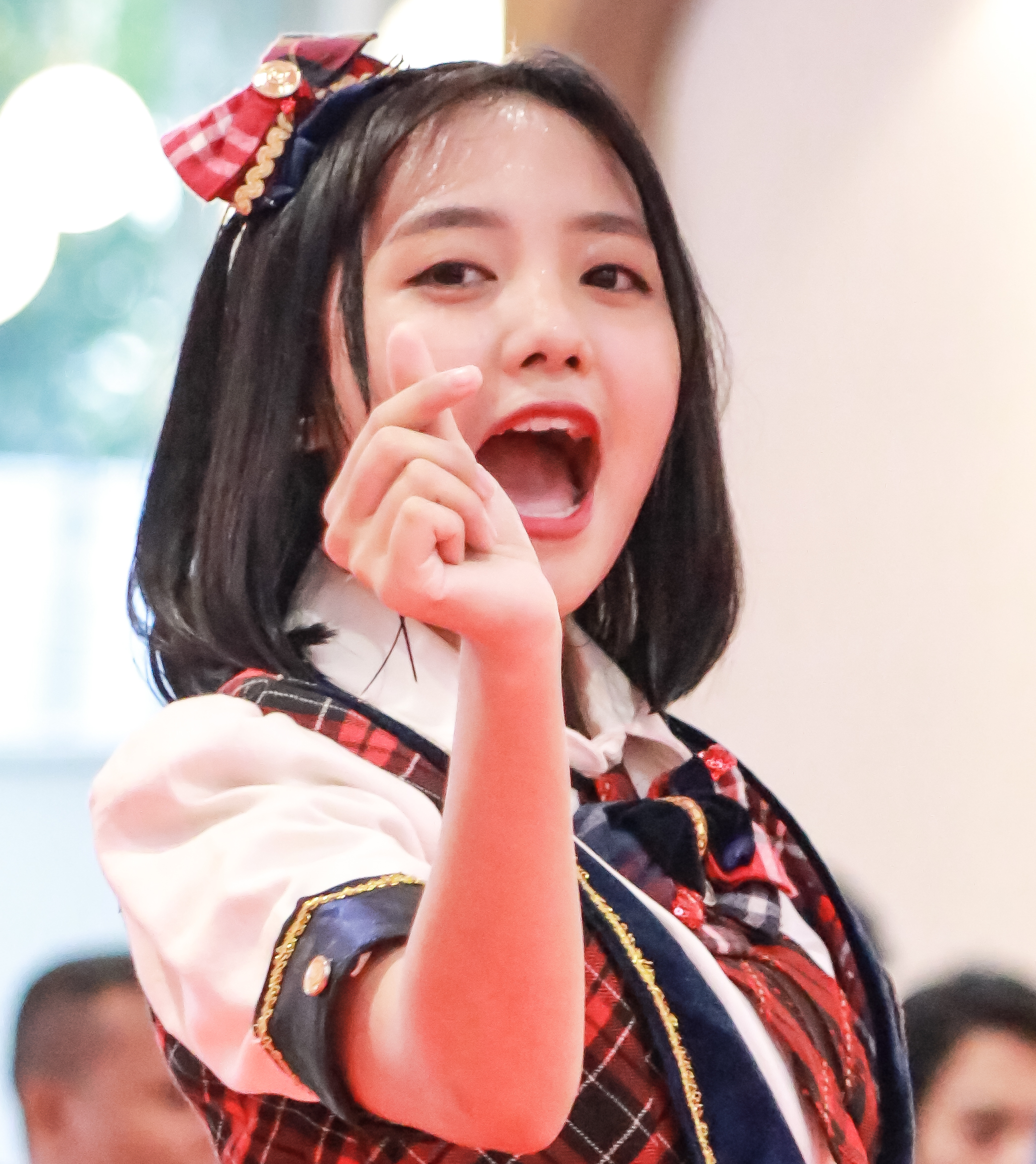
Nabila Y. F.

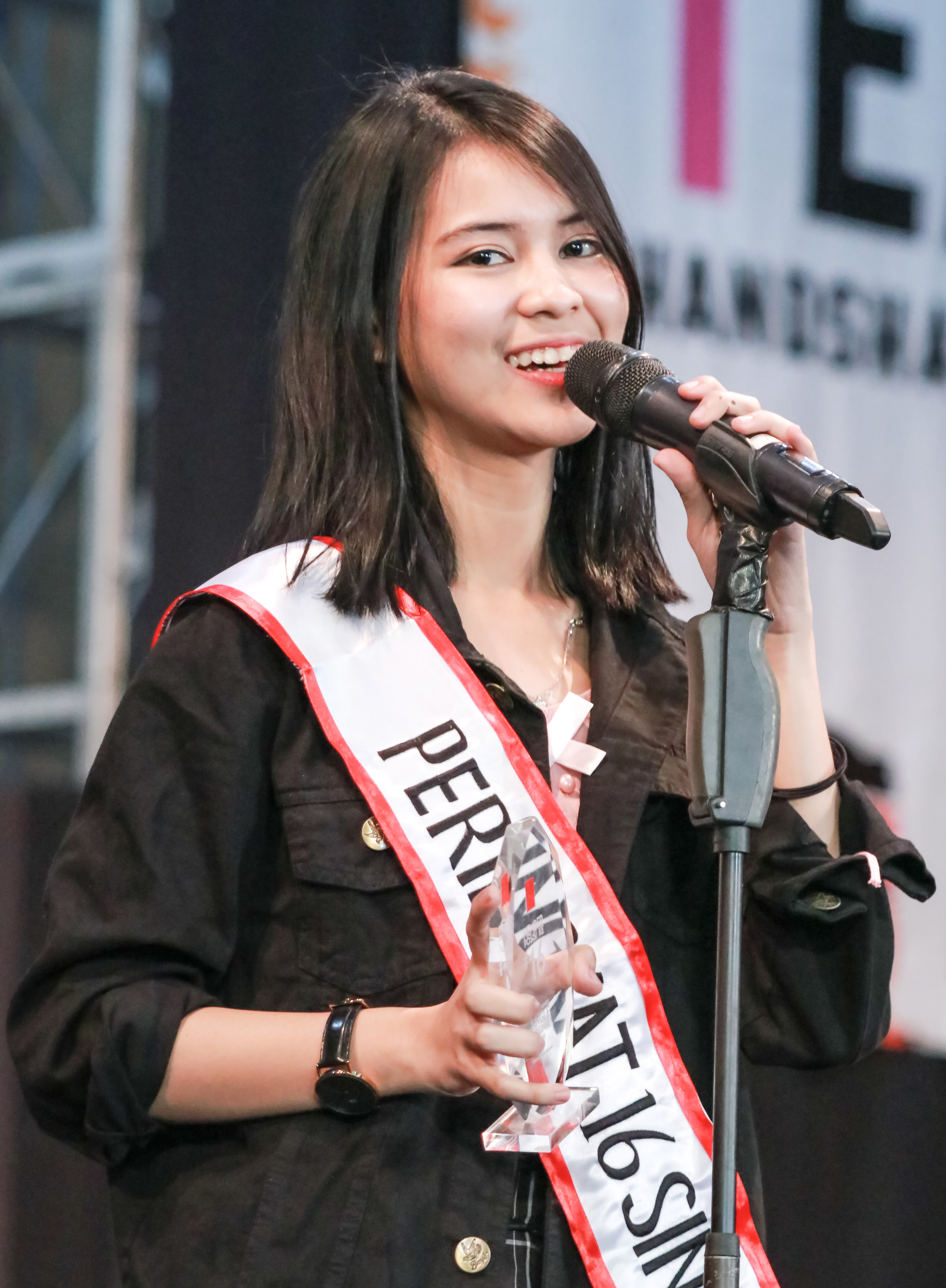
Viona Fadrin

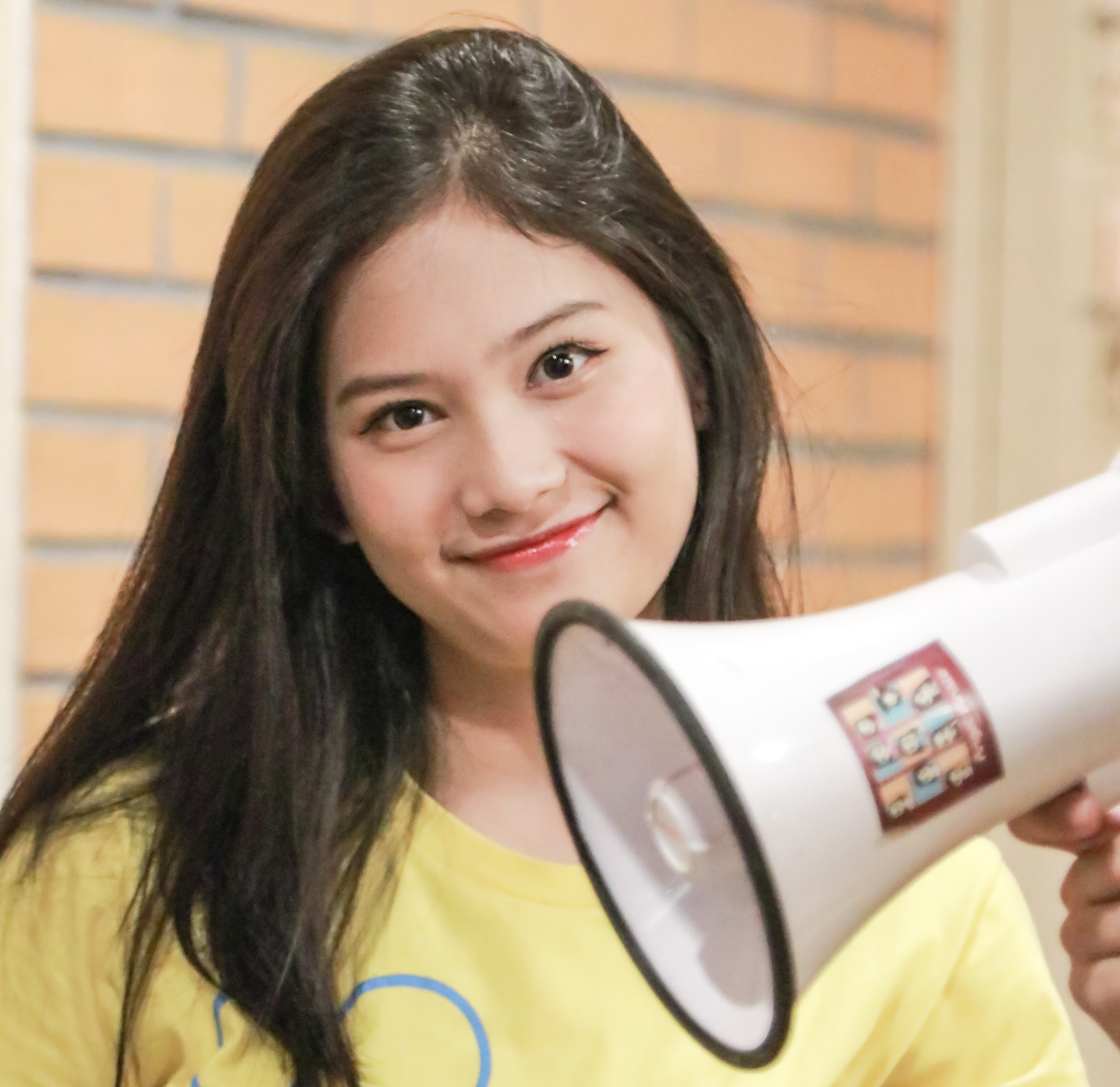
Yessica Tamara

On 29 September 2018, the seventh generation members were announced.

Kanya Caya broke the record for shortest membership tenure in the group's history, resigning only seven days after her introduction.

Name	Birth date	Status	Membership history
Aiko Harumi Nangin	23 March 2002 (age 24)	Left on 29 July 2020	Class B Academy (29 September – 16 December 2018); Class A Academy (16 December 2018 – 29 July 2020)
Angelina Christy	5 December 2005 (age 20)	Team Passion member	Class B Academy (29 September – 28 October 2018); Class A Academy (28 October 2018 – 20 July 2019); Team KIII (21 July 2019 – 13 March 2021); Active member (14 March 2021 – 31 March 2026); Team Passion (1 April 2026 – present)
Aurel Mayori Putri	14 May 2006 (age 20)	Graduated on 12 March 2021	Class B Academy (29 September – 28 October 2018); Class A Academy (28 October 2018 – 6 October 2019); Team J (7 October 2019 – 21 August 2020); Team T (22 August 2020 – 12 March 2021)
Azizi Shafaa Asadel	16 May 2004 (age 22)	Graduated on 25 August 2024	Class B Academy (29 September – 28 October 2018); Class A Academy (28 October 2018 – 6 October 2019); Team J (7 October 2019 – 14 March 2021); Active member (15 March 2021 – 25 August 2024)
Calista Lea Jaya (written as Calista Lea)	15 July 2002 (age 24)	Left on 24 January 2019	Class B Academy (29 September 2018 – 24 January 2019)
Dhea Angelia	18 August 2001 (age 25)	Graduated on 23 February 2023	Class B Academy (29 September – 28 October 2018); Class A Academy (28 October 2018 – 21 August 2020); Team T (22 August 2020 – 12 March 2021); Active member (13 March 2021 – 23 February 2023)
Feby Komaril	3 February 2000 (age 26)	Graduated on 11 March 2021	Class B Academy (29 September – 28 October 2018); Class A Academy (28 October 2018 – 11 March 2021)
Febrina Diponegoro	17 February 2002 (age 24)	Graduated on 11 March 2021	Class B Academy (29 September – 16 December 2018); Class A Academy (16 December 2018 – 11 March 2021)
Febriola Sinambela	26 February 2005 (age 21)	Team Dream member	Class B Academy (29 September – 16 December 2018); Class A Academy (16 December 2018 – 21 August 2020); Team T (22 August 2020 – 12 March 2021); Active member (13 March 2021 – 31 March 2026); Team Dream (1 April 2026 – present)
Raden Rara Freyanashifa Jayawardana	13 February 2006 (age 20)	Team Dream, group captain	Class B Academy (29 September – 16 December 2018); Class A Academy (16 December 2018 – 21 August 2020); Team T (22 August 2020 – 12 March 2021); Active member (13 March 2021 – 31 March 2026); Team Dream (1 April 2026 – present)
Gabriel Angelina Laeman	17 July 2004 (age 22)	Graduated on 14 March 2021	Class B Academy (29 September – 28 October 2018); Class A Academy (28 October 2018 – 20 July 2019); Team T (21 July 2019 – 31 December 2019); Team J (1 January 2020 – 14 March 2021)
Helisma Mauludzunia Putri Kurnia	15 June 2000 (age 26)	Team Dream member	Class B Academy (29 September – 28 October 2018); Class A Academy (28 October 2018 – 4 August 2019); Team KIII (5 August 2019 – 13 March 2021); Active member (14 March 2021 – 31 March 2026); Team Dream (1 April 2026 – present)
Jessica Rich Chandra	23 September 2005 (age 21)	Team Passion member	Class B Academy (29 September 2018 – 26 January 2019); Class A Academy (26 January 2019 – 21 August 2020); Team T (22 August 2020 – 12 March 2021); Active member (13 March 2021 – 31 March 2026); Team Passion (1 April 2026 – present)
Jesslyn Callista	20 April 2000 (age 26)	Graduated on 29 July 2023	Class B Academy (29 September – 16 December 2018); Class A Academy (16 December 2018 – 21 August 2020); Team T (22 August 2020 – 12 March 2021); Active member (13 March 2021 – 29 July 2023)
Kanya Caya	22 November 2004 (age 21)	Resigned on 6 October 2018	Class B Academy (29 September – 6 October 2018)
Mutiara Azzahra Umandana	12 July 2004 (age 22)	Team Passion member	Class B Academy (29 September – 28 October 2018); Class A Academy (28 October 2018 – 4 August 2019); Team KIII (5 August 2019 – 13 March 2021); Active member (14 March 2021 – 31 March 2026); Team Passion (1 April 2026 – present)
Nabila Yussi Fitriana	29 December 2000 (age 25)	Graduated on 14 March 2021	Class B Academy (29 September – 28 October 2018); Class A Academy (28 October 2018 – 20 July 2019); Team T (21 July 2019 – 31 December 2019); Team J (1 January 2020 – 14 March 2021)
Rifa Fatmasari	10 May 2000 (age 26)	Resigned on 13 September 2019	Class B Academy (29 September – 28 October 2018); Class A Academy (28 October 2018 – 13 September 2019)
Viona Fadrin	8 November 2000 (age 25)	Graduated on 12 March 2021	Class B Academy (29 September – 28 October 2018); Class A Academy (28 October 2018 – 21 August 2020); Team T (22 August 2020 – 12 March 2021)
Yessica Tamara	24 September 2002 (age 24)	Graduated on 20 January 2024	Class B Academy (29 September – 28 October 2018); Class A Academy (28 October 2018 – 20 July 2019); Team KIII (21 July 2019 – 13 March 2021); Active member (14 March 2021 – 20 January 2024)

=== Eighth generation ===
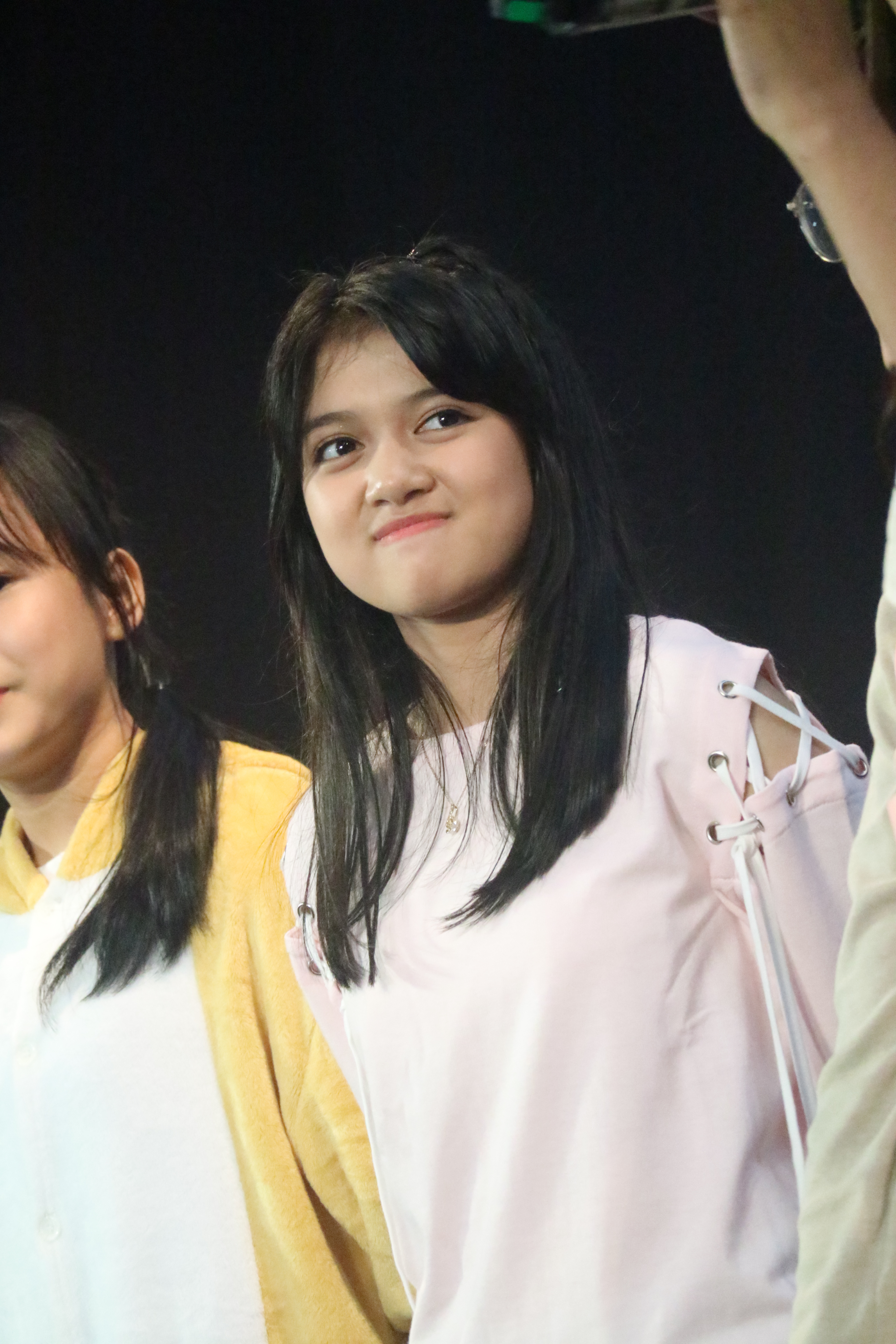
Amanina Afiqah I.

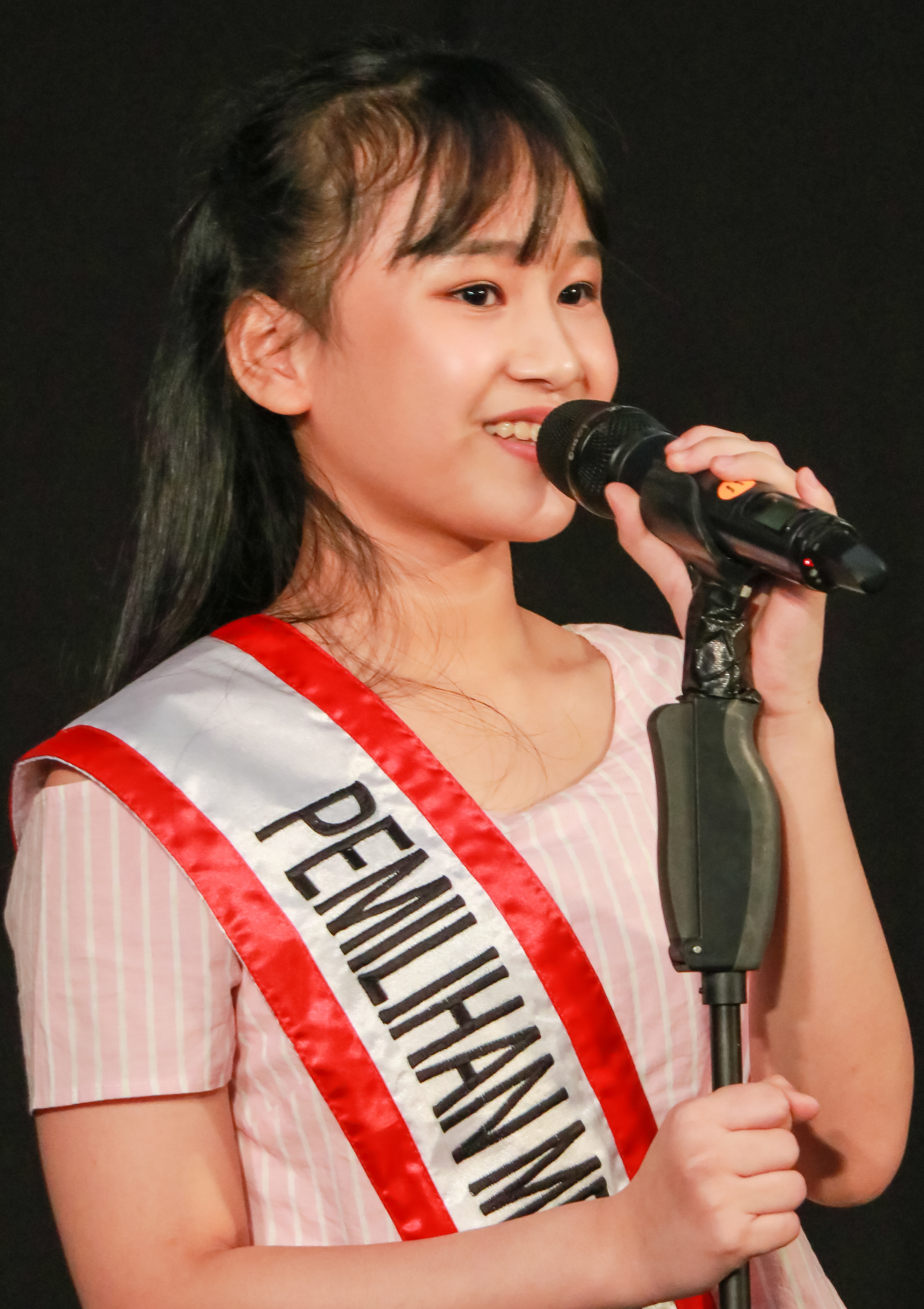
Cindy Nugroho

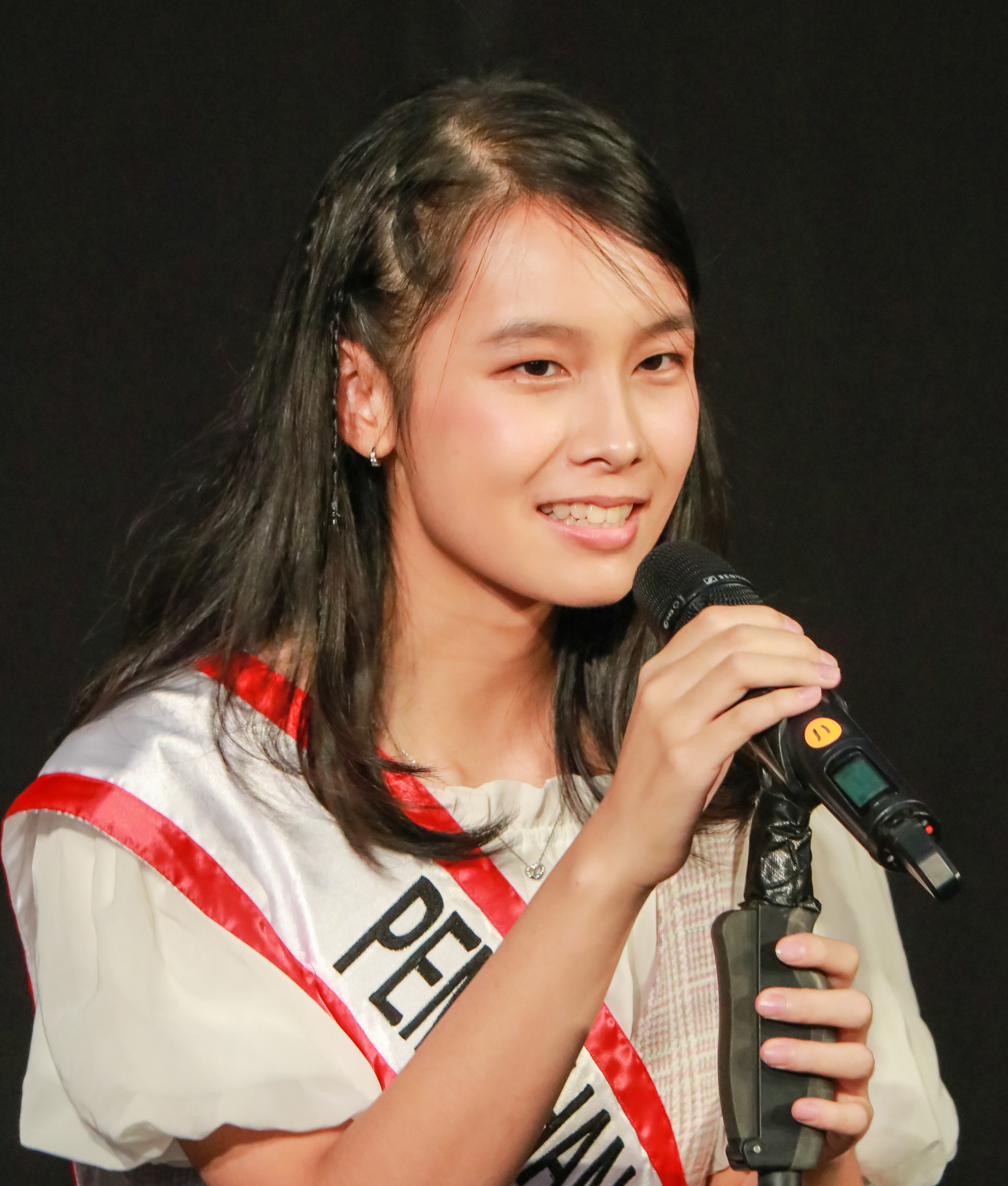
Devytha M. P.

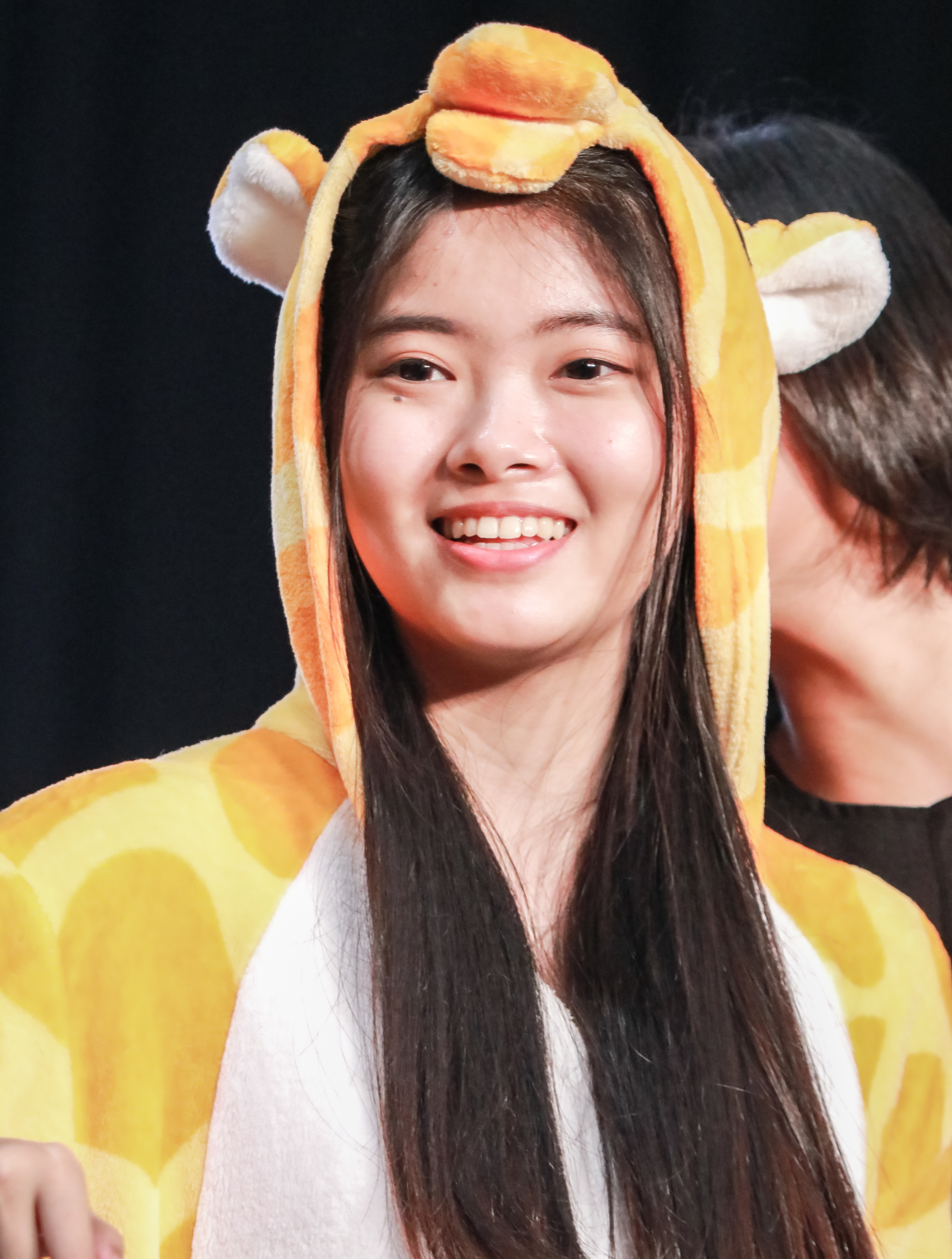
Fiony Alveria T.

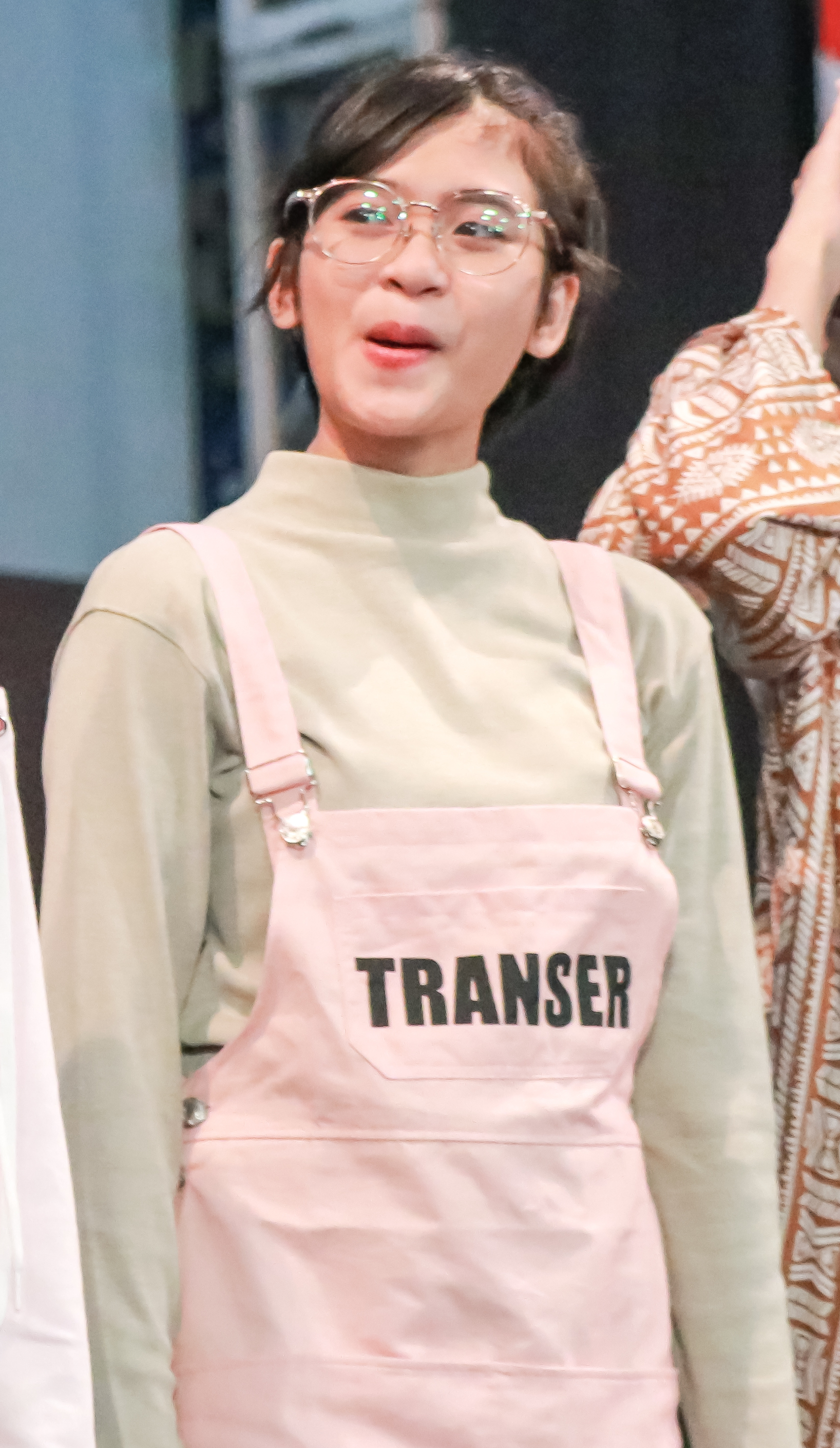
Flora Shafiqa R.

The eighth generation members were announced on 27 April 2019. This generation brought two girls as the last members to be born in the 20th century.

Name	Birth date	Status	Membership history
Amanina Afiqah Ibrahim	6 January 2006 (age 20)	Graduated on 14 March 2021	Class B Academy (27 April – 26 May 2019); Class A Academy (26 May 2019 – 21 August 2020); Team J (22 August 2020 – 14 March 2021)
Amirah Fatin Yasin	12 October 2000 (age 26)	Graduated on 27 November 2021	Class B Academy (27 April – 30 June 2019); Class A Academy (30 June 2019 – 21 August 2020); Team T (22 August 2020 – 12 March 2021); Active member (13 March – 27 November 2021)
Cindy Nugroho	9 June 2007 (age 19)	Graduated on 11 March 2021	Class B Academy (27 April – 3 August 2019); Class A Academy (3 August 2019 – 11 March 2021)
Cornelia Syafa Vanisa	26 July 2002 (age 24)	Team Passion member	Class B Academy (27 April – 26 May 2019); Class A Academy (26 May 2019 – 21 August 2020); Team T (22 August 2020 – 12 March 2021); Active member (13 March 2021 – 31 March 2026); Team Passion (1 April 2026 – present)
Devytha Maharani Putri	22 November 2002 (age 23)	Left on 30 March 2020	Class B Academy (27 April – 30 June 2019); Class A Academy (30 June 2019 – 30 March 2020)
Eriena Kartika Dewi	18 April 2003 (age 23)	Left on 16 May 2020	Class B Academy (27 April – 26 May 2019); Class A Academy (26 May 2019 – 16 May 2020)
Fiony Alveria Tantri	4 February 2002 (age 24)	Team Love member	Class B Academy (27 April – 30 June 2019); Class A Academy (30 June 2019 – 21 August 2020); Team T (22 August 2020 – 12 March 2021); Active member (13 March 2021 – 31 March 2026); Team Love (1 April 2026 – present)
Flora Shafiqa Riyadi	4 April 2005 (age 21)	Resigned on 5 March 2025	Class B Academy (27 April – 3 August 2019); Class A Academy (3 August 2019 – 21 August 2020); Team T (22 August 2020 – 12 March 2021); Active member (13 March 2021 – 5 March 2025)
Gabriella Stevany Loide; Lenggana Harahap	22 May 2002 (age 24)	Graduated on 11 March 2021	Class B Academy (27 April – 28 May 2019); Class A Academy (28 May 2019 – 11 March 2021)
Keisya Ramadhani	10 November 2004 (age 21)	Graduated on 11 March 2021	Class B Academy (27 April – 30 June 2019); Class A Academy (30 June 2019 – 11 March 2021)
Lulu Azkiya Salsabila	23 October 2002 (age 24)	Team Passion member	Class B Academy (27 April – 28 May 2019); Class A Academy (28 May 2019 – 21 August 2020); Team T (22 August 2020 – 12 March 2021); Active member (13 March 2021 – 31 March 2026); Team Passion (1 April 2026 – present)
Nyimas Ratu Rafa Futuhni Kamil	1 July 2005 (age 21)	Resigned on 9 November 2020	Class B Academy (27 April – 3 August 2019); Class A Academy (3 August 2019 – 21 August 2020); Team T (22 August – 9 November 2020)
Pamela Krysanthe Adidjaya	3 October 2003 (age 23)	Left on 7 February 2020	Class B Academy (27 April – 28 May 2019); Class A Academy (28 May 2019 – 7 February 2020)
Reva Adriana Ramadhani	3 November 2004 (age 21)	Resigned on 30 December 2019	Class B Academy (27 April – 26 May 2019); Class A Academy (26 May – 30 December 2019)
Reva Fidela Adel Pantjoro	14 July 2006 (age 20)	Graduated on 12 October 2024	Class B Academy (27 April – 30 June 2019); Class A Academy (30 June 2019 – 21 August 2020); Team T (22 August 2020 – 12 March 2021); Active member (13 March 2021 – 12 October 2024)
Salma Annisa	16 August 2000 (age 26)	Resigned on 1 September 2020	Class B Academy (27 April – 28 May 2019); Class A Academy (28 May 2019 – 1 September 2020)
Umega Maulana Sinambela	27 March 2004 (age 22)	Graduated on 12 March 2021	Class B Academy (27 April – 3 August 2019); Class A Academy (3 August 2019 – 21 August 2020); Team T (22 August 2020 – 12 March 2021)
Zahra Nur Khaulah	5 August 2003 (age 23)	Dismissed on 25 August 2021	Class B Academy (27 April – 26 May 2019); Class A Academy (26 May 2019 – 21 August 2020); Team KIII (22 August 2020 – 13 March 2021); Active member (14 March – 25 August 2021)

=== Ninth generation ===
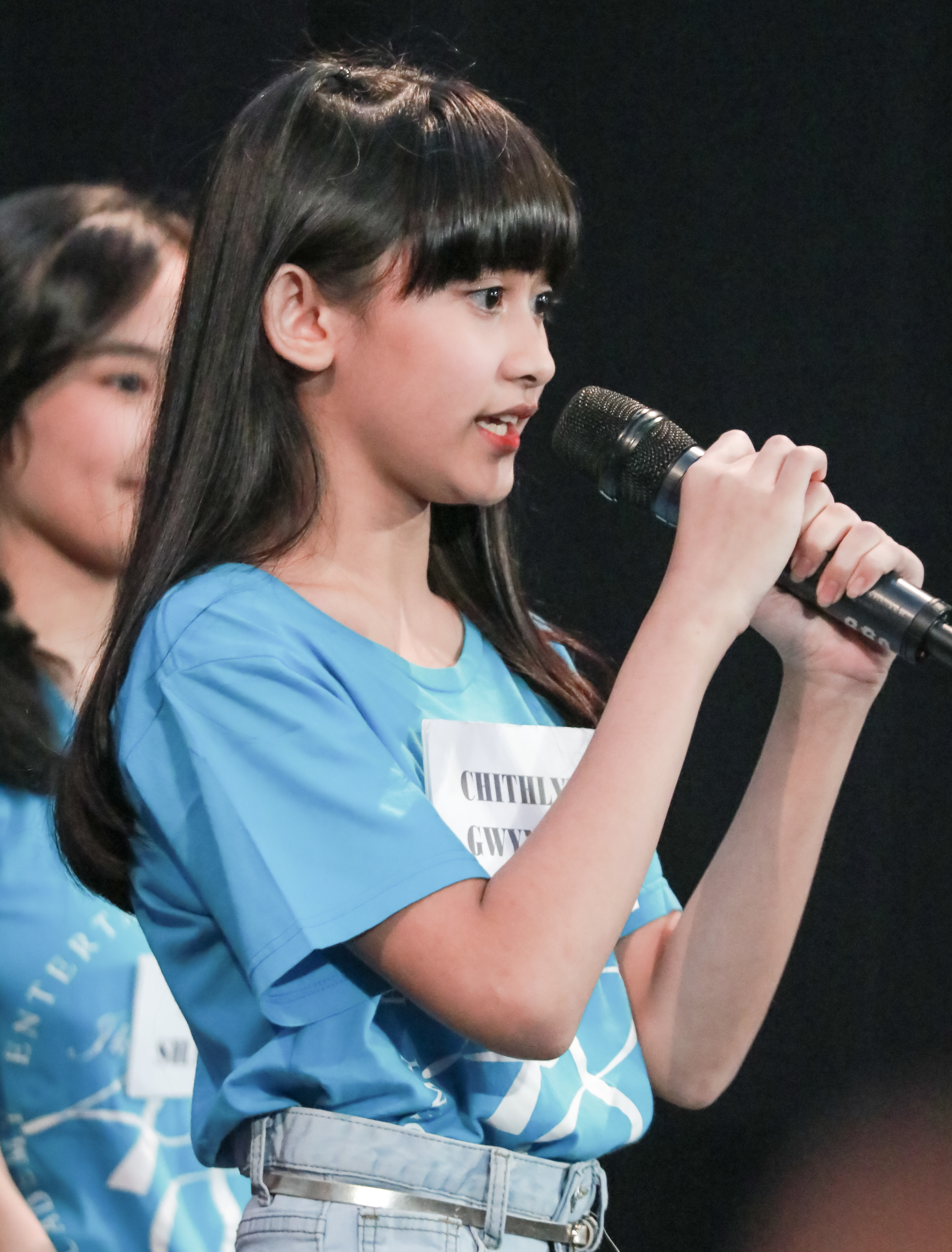
Caithlyn Gwyneth Santoso, who until 2022 is the latest-born JKT48 member. She entered the group when she was 10 and graduated just 15 days before her 12th birthday.

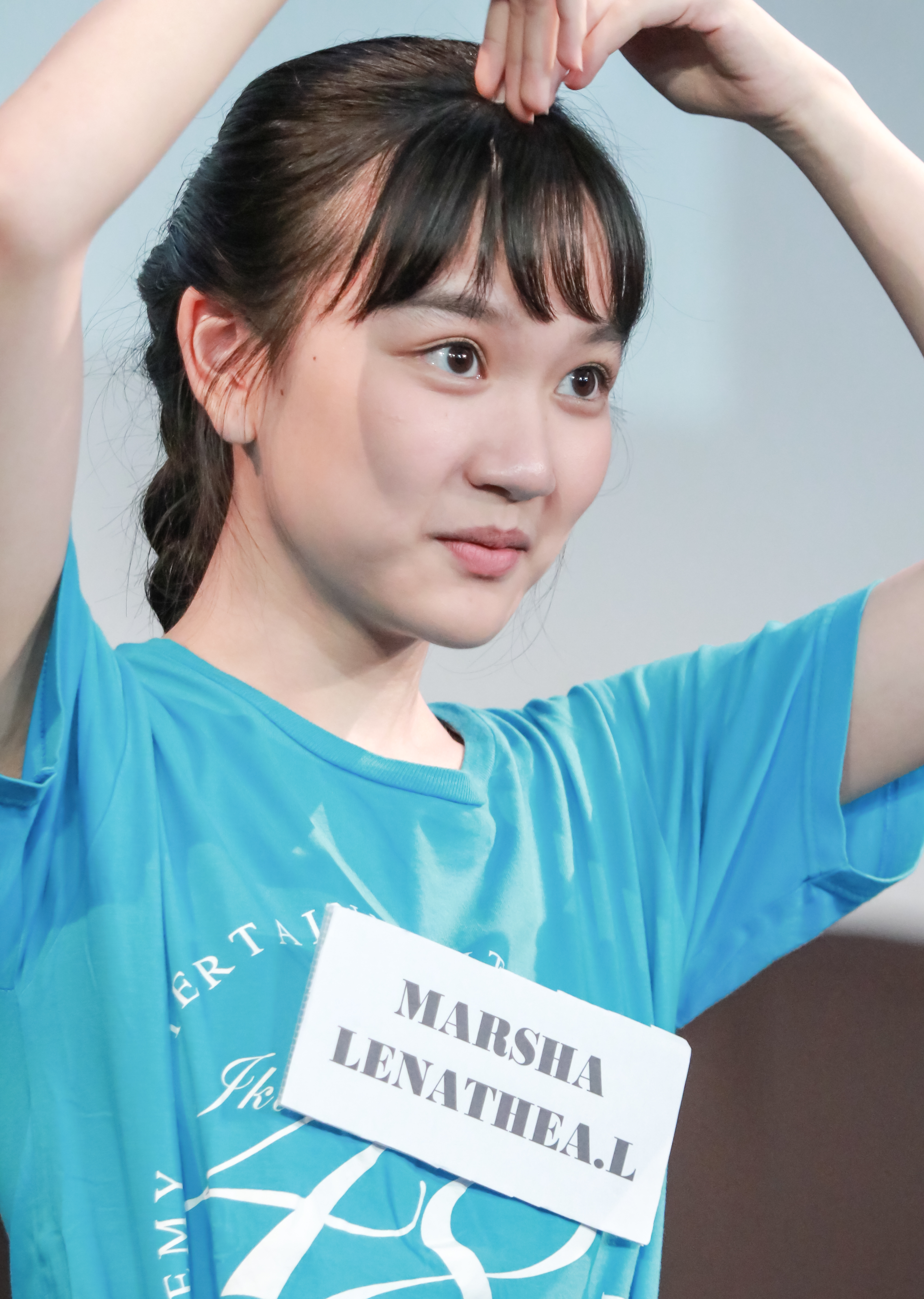
Marsha Lenathea Lapian

The ninth generation members were announced on 1 December 2019.

Name	Birth date	Status	Membership history
Adzana Shaliha Alifyaa	8 January 2005 (age 21)	Graduated on 11 February 2024	Class B Academy (1 December 2019 – 25 January 2020); Class A Academy (25 January 2020 – 11 March 2021); Active member (12 March 2021 – 11 February 2024)
Caithlyn Gwyneth Santoso	26 March 2009 (age 17)	Graduated on 11 March 2021	Class B Academy (1 December 2019 – 25 January 2020); Class A Academy (25 January 2020 – 11 March 2021)
Chalista Ellysia Sugianto	1 March 2006 (age 20)	Graduated on 11 March 2021	Class B Academy (1 December 2019 – 25 January 2020); Class A Academy (25 January 2020 – 11 March 2021)
Christabel Angela Jocelyn Santoso	17 August 2007 (age 19)	Graduated on 11 March 2021	Class B Academy (1 December 2019 – 25 January 2020); Class A Academy (25 January 2020 – 11 March 2021)
Indah Cahya Nabilla	20 March 2001 (age 25)	Team Love member	Class B Academy (1 December 2019 – 25 January 2020); Class A Academy (25 January 2020 – 11 March 2021); Active member (12 March 2021 – 31 March 2026); Team Love (1 April 2026 – present)
Iris Vevina Prasetio	5 August 2003 (age 23)	Resigned on 30 December 2019	Class B Academy (1–30 December 2019)
Kathrina Irene Indarto Putri	26 July 2006 (age 20)	Team Passion member	Class B Academy (1 December 2019 – 25 January 2020); Class A Academy (25 January 2020 – 11 March 2021); Active member (12 March 2021 – 31 March 2026); Team Passion (1 April 2026 – present)
Lian Olivia Payten (written as Olivia Payten)	13 October 2003 (age 23)	Left on 17 February 2020	Class B Academy (1 December 2019 – 25 January 2020); Class A Academy (25 January – 17 February 2020)
Marsha Lenathea Lapian	9 January 2006 (age 20)	Team Dream member	Class B Academy (1 December 2019 – 25 January 2020); Class A Academy (25 January 2020 – 11 March 2021); Active member (12 March 2021 – 31 March 2026); Team Dream (1 April 2026 – present)
Nabila Gusmarlia Putri	22 June 2005 (age 21)	Graduated on 11 March 2021	Class B Academy (1 December 2019 – 25 January 2020); Class A Academy (25 January 2020 – 11 March 2021)
Putri Elzahra	19 May 2006 (age 20)	Graduated on 11 March 2021	Class B Academy (1 December 2019 – 25 January 2020); Class A Academy (25 January 2020 – 11 March 2021)
Shinta Devi Sujaya	7 June 2003 (age 23)	Graduated on 11 March 2021	Class B Academy (1 December 2019 – 25 January 2020); Class A Academy (25 January 2020 – 11 March 2021)
Tiara Sasi Kirana Putri (written as Tiara Sasi)	29 March 2001 (age 25)	Left on 17 February 2020	Class B Academy (1 December 2019 – 25 January 2020); Class A Academy (25 January – 17 February 2020)

=== Tenth generation ===
The 11 tenth generation members were announced via live streaming on 27 August 2020. On 4 December 2020, their memberships were cancelled due to the internal crisis caused by the COVID-19 pandemic. On 18 December 2021, eight of them returned to the group.

Name	Birth date	Status	Membership history
Abieza Syabira	5 April 2002 (age 24)	Membership cancelled on 4 December 2020	Class B Academy (27 August – 4 December 2020)
Alia Giselle Maharani	20 December 2006 (age 19)	Resigned on 3 April 2023	Class B Academy (27 August – 4 December 2020); Trainee (18 December 2021 – 3 April 2023)
Amanda Puspita Sukma Mulyadewi	17 December 2004 (age 21)	Graduated on 29 March 2026	Class B Academy (27 August – 4 December 2020); Trainee (18 December 2021 – 7 May 2023); Active member (8 May 2023 – 29 March 2026)
Aurellia	29 October 2002 (age 23)	Team Love member	Class B Academy (27 August – 4 December 2020); Trainee (18 December 2021 – 7 May 2023); Active member (8 May 2023 – 31 March 2026); Team Love (1 April 2026 – present)
Callista Alifia Wardhana	8 August 2005 (age 21)	Left on 20 December 2024	Class B Academy (27 August – 4 December 2020); Trainee (18 December 2021 – 7 May 2023); Active member (8 May 2023 – 20 December 2024)
Danessa Valerie Hertanto	4 April 2002 (age 24)	Membership cancelled on 4 December 2020	Class B Academy (27 August – 4 December 2020)
Gabriela Abigail Mewengkang	7 August 2006 (age 20)	Team Dream member	Class B Academy (27 August – 4 December 2020); Trainee (18 December 2021 – 7 May 2023); Active member (8 May 2023 – 31 March 2026); Team Dream (1 April 2026 – present)
Indira Putri Seruni	26 April 2004 (age 22)	Graduated on 12 September 2025	Class B Academy (27 August – 4 December 2020); Trainee (18 December 2021 – 7 May 2023); Active member (8 May 2023 – 12 September 2025)
Jesslyn Septiani Elly	13 September 2001 (age 25)	Team Dream member	Class B Academy (27 August – 4 December 2020); Trainee (18 December 2021 – 7 May 2023); Active member (8 May 2023 – 31 March 2026); Team Dream (1 April 2026 – present)
Naura Safinatunnajah	20 August 2003 (age 23)	Membership cancelled on 4 December 2020	Class B Academy (27 August – 4 December 2020)
Raisha Syifa Wardhana	11 November 2007 (age 18)	Team Passion member	Class B Academy (27 August – 4 December 2020); Trainee (18 December 2021 – 7 May 2023); Active member (8 May 2023 – 31 March 2026); Team Passion (1 April 2026 – present)

=== Eleventh generation ===
The 14 eleventh generation members were announced during a Halloween event on 31 October 2022. This generation brought Gendis Mayrannisa Setiawan as the first member to be born in the 2010s, Dena and Desy Natalia Ang as the first twins to enter the group, and Chelsea Davina Norman as the first non-Asian national in the group.

Name	Birth date	Status	Membership history
Alya Amanda Fatihah	26 August 2006 (age 20)	Graduated on 6 September 2026	Trainee (31 October 2022 – 31 October 2024); Active member (1 November 2024 – 31 March 2026); Team Love (1 April – 6 September 2026)
Anindya Ramadhani Purnomo	18 October 2005 (age 21)	Team Love member	Trainee (31 October 2022 – 31 October 2024); Active member (1 November 2024 – 31 March 2026); Team Love (1 April 2026 – present)
Aulia Asyira Basarestu	19 January 2007 (age 19)	Resigned on 3 April 2023	Trainee (31 October 2022 – 3 April 2023)
Cathleen Nixie Yap	28 May 2009 (age 17)	Graduated on 15 August 2026	Trainee (31 October 2022 – 31 October 2024); Active member (1 November 2024 – 31 March 2026); Team Love (1 April – 15 August 2026)
Celline Thefannie	9 April 2007 (age 19)	Team Love member	Trainee (31 October 2022 – 31 October 2024); Active member (1 November 2024 – 31 March 2026); Team Love (1 April 2026 – present)
(Australia) Chelsea Davina Norman	23 December 2009 (age 16)	Graduated on 30 May 2026	Trainee (31 October 2022 – 31 October 2024); Active member (1 November 2024 – 31 March 2026); Team Dream (1 April – 30 May 2026)
Cynthia Yaputera	22 November 2003 (age 22)	Team Love member	Trainee (31 October 2022 – 31 October 2024); Active member (1 November 2024 – 31 March 2026); Team Love (1 April 2026 – present)
Dena Natalia Ang	16 December 2005 (age 20)	Team Passion member	Trainee (31 October 2022 – 31 October 2024); Active member (1 November 2024 – 31 March 2026); Team Passion (1 April 2026 – present)
Desy Natalia Ang	16 December 2005 (age 20)	Team Passion member	Trainee (31 October 2022 – 31 October 2024); Active member (1 November 2024 – 31 March 2026); Team Passion (1 April 2026 – present)
Gendis Mayrannisa Setiawan	23 June 2010 (age 16)	Resigned on 25 July 2026	Trainee (31 October 2022 – 31 October 2024); Active member (1 November 2024 – 31 March 2026); Team Dream (1 April – 25 July 2026)
Grace Octaviani Tanujaya	18 October 2007 (age 19)	Team Love member	Trainee (31 October 2022 – 31 January 2024); Active member (1 February 2024 – 31 March 2026); Team Love (1 April 2026 – present)
Greesella Sophina Adhalia	10 January 2006 (age 20)	Team Dream member	Trainee (31 October 2022 – 31 January 2024); Active member (1 February 2024 – 31 March 2026); Team Dream (1 April 2026 – present)
Jeane Victoria Kurniawan	5 June 2006 (age 20)	Dismissed on 22 May 2024	Trainee (31 October 2022 – 22 May 2024)
Michelle Alexandra Suandi	22 April 2009 (age 17)	Team Love member	Trainee (31 October 2022 – 31 October 2024); Active member (1 November 2024 – 31 March 2026); Team Love (1 April 2026 – present)

=== Twelfth generation ===
On 18 November 2023, the group announced 17 newly recruited trainees from the twelfth generation. They were all promoted as regular members from 1 January 2026.

Name	Birth date	Status	Membership history
Abigail Rachel Lie	6 August 2008 (age 18)	Team Passion member	Trainee (18 November 2023 – 31 December 2025); Active member (1 January 2026 – 31 March 2026); Team Passion (1 April 2026 – present)
Adeline Wijaya	1 September 2007 (age 19)	Team Dream member	Trainee (18 November 2023 – 31 December 2025); Active member (1 January 2026 – 31 March 2026); Team Dream (1 April 2026 – present)
Aisa Maharani Napitupulu	31 January 2006 (age 20)	Resigned on 26 June 2024	Trainee (18 November 2023 – 26 June 2024)
Aurhel Alana Tirta	14 September 2006 (age 20)	Team Love member	Trainee (18 November 2023 – 30 April 2025); Active member (1 May 2025 – 31 December 2025); Active member (1 January 2026 – 31 March 2026); Team Love (1 April 2026 – present)
Catherina Vallencia Kurniawan	21 August 2007 (age 19)	Team Passion member	Trainee (18 November 2023 – 31 December 2025); Active member (1 January 2026 – 31 March 2026); Team Passion (1 April 2026 – present)
Fritzy Rosmerian	28 July 2008 (age 18)	Team Love member	Trainee (18 November 2023 – 30 April 2025); Active member (1 May 2025 – 31 December 2025); Active member (1 January 2026 – 31 March 2026); Team Love (1 April 2026 – present)
(United States) Hillary Abigail	19 October 2007 (age 19)	Team Love member	Trainee (18 November 2023 – 31 December 2025); Active member (1 January 2026 – 31 March 2026); Team Love (1 April 2026 – present)
Jazzlyn Agatha Trisha Indra Putri	16 February 2011 (age 15)	Team Love member	Trainee (18 November 2023 – 31 December 2025); Active member (1 January 2026 – 31 March 2026); Team Love (1 April 2026 – present)
Letycia Moreen Praditya	7 June 2010 (age 16)	Resigned on 1 May 2025	Trainee (18 November 2023 – 1 May 2025)
Michelle Levia Arifin	24 January 2009 (age 17)	Team Passion member	Trainee (18 November 2023 – 31 December 2025); Active member (1 January 2026 – 31 March 2026); Team Passion (1 April 2026 – present)
(Japan) Nayla Suji Aurelia Araki	18 June 2007 (age 19)	Team Love member	Trainee (18 November 2023 – 31 December 2025); Active member (1 January 2026 – 31 March 2026); Team Love (1 April 2026 – present)
Nina Tutachia Browning Chapman	16 October 2009 (age 17)	Team Dream member	Trainee (18 November 2023 – 31 December 2025); Active member (1 January 2026 – 31 March 2026); Team Dream (1 April 2026 – present)
Oline Manuel Tjay	3 November 2007 (age 18)	Team Dream member	Trainee (18 November 2023 – 31 December 2025); Active member (1 January 2026 – 31 March 2026); Team Dream (1 April 2026 – present)
Regina Wilian Hapsari	10 December 2009 (age 16)	Resigned on 18 August 2025	Trainee (18 November 2023 – 18 August 2025)
Ribka Budiman	13 January 2009 (age 17)	Team Passion member	Trainee (18 November 2023 – 31 December 2025); Active member (1 January 2026 – 31 March 2026); Team Passion (1 April 2026 – present)
Shahbilqis Naila Bustomi	1 September 2008 (age 18)	Team Dream member	Trainee (18 November 2023 – 31 December 2025); Active member (1 January 2026 – 31 March 2026); Team Dream (1 April 2026 – present)
Victoria Kimberly Lukitama	8 March 2010 (age 16)	Team Passion member	Trainee (18 November 2023 – 31 December 2025); Active member (1 January 2026 – 31 March 2026); Team Passion (1 April 2026 – present)

=== Thirteenth generation ===
On 31 October 2024, the group announced nine newly recruited trainees for the 13th generation, the lowest ever number of members recruited in one cycle.

Name	Birth date	Status	Membership history
Astrella Virgiananda Nugraha	6 August 2010 (age 16)	Trainee	Trainee (31 October 2024 – present)
Aulia Riza Firdausy Effendi	14 July 2007 (age 19)	Resigned on 30 August 2026	Trainee (31 October 2024 – 30 August 2026)
Bong Aprilli Paskah	1 April 2010 (age 16)	Trainee	Trainee (31 October 2024 – present)
Hagia Sopia	1 July 2008 (age 18)	Trainee	Trainee (31 October 2024 – present)
Humaira Ramadhani Salfiandi	13 August 2011 (age 15)	Trainee	Trainee (31 October 2024 – present)
Jacqueline Immanuela Jonathan	9 July 2009 (age 17)	Trainee	Trainee (31 October 2024 – present)
Jemima Evodie Mayra Lijaya	9 November 2009 (age 16)	Trainee	Trainee (31 October 2024 – present)
Mikaela Kusjanto	15 December 2007 (age 18)	Trainee	Trainee (31 October 2024 – present)
Nur Intan	24 February 2006 (age 20)	Trainee	Trainee (31 October 2024 – present)

=== Fourteenth generation ===
On 14 February 2026, the group announced eleven newly recruited trainees for the 14th generation. This generation brought six members who were born after the group's establishment in November 2011.

Name	Birth date	Status	Membership history
Afera Thalia Putri Eysteinn	20 October 2012 (age 14)	Trainee	Trainee (14 February 2026 – present)
Carissa Dini Asmaranti	2 February 2012 (age 14)	Trainee	Trainee (14 February 2026 – present)
Christabella Bonita Claura Chandra	2 March 2011 (age 15)	Trainee	Trainee (14 February 2026 – present)
Fahira Putri Kirana	13 August 2012 (age 14)	Trainee	Trainee (14 February 2026 – present)
Fatimah Azzahra	30 August 2010 (age 16)	Trainee	Trainee (14 February 2026 – present)
Heidi Suyangga	27 August 2008 (age 18)	Trainee	Trainee (14 February 2026 – present)
Maegan Jovanka Andhita Putri	21 December 2011 (age 14)	Resigned on 9 March 2026	Trainee (14 February – 9 March 2026)
Maxine Faye Lee	2 December 2011 (age 14)	Trainee	Trainee (14 February 2026 – present)
Putry Jazyta	12 March 2011 (age 15)	Trainee	Trainee (14 February 2026 – present)
Ralyne Van Irwan	15 October 2011 (age 15)	Trainee	Trainee (14 February 2026 – present)
Sona Kalyana Purboprasetyani	1 December 2011 (age 14)	Trainee	Trainee (14 February 2026 – present)

=== Overseas transfers ===
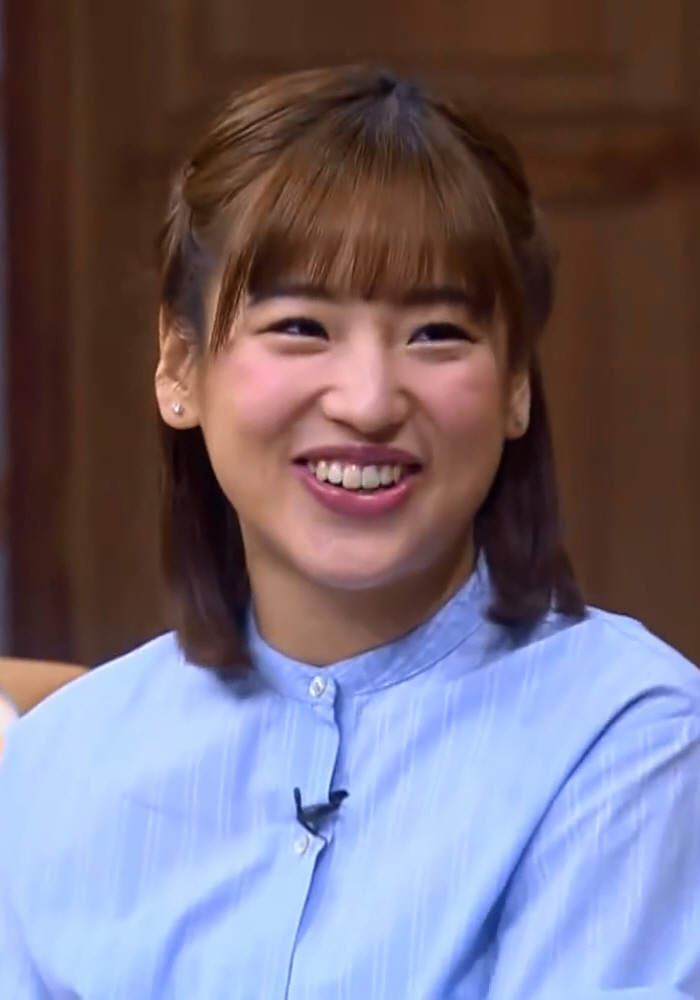
Haruka Nakagawa, the only member to have been appeared in all 15 of JKT48's earliest singles (2013–2016).

During its existence, several Japanese AKB48 members have been transferred to its Jakarta sister group. In 2012, Aki Takajo and Haruka Nakagawa, whose transfers were announced on 24 August, officially joined on 1 November, entered the newly-assembled Team J on 23 December, and made their theater debut on 3 days later. Nakagawa became interested in Jakarta during a visit with other members of AKB48 in February 2012. On 24 February 2014, at the AKB48 Group Dai Sokaku Matsuri (Grand Organization Festival), Takajo was announced to return to AKB48 while Rina Chikano was transferred to JKT48. Chikano then assigned to Team KIII on 11 June 2014. Both Nakagawa and Chikano would graduate here.

During the Jak-Japan Matsuri event on 9 September 2018 in Jakarta which featured both groups, Saya Kawamoto was sent in an exchange program for roughly a month. Going the other way was Stephanie Pricilla Indarto Putri, an Indonesian.

(Japan) Name	Birth date	Date joined	Status	Membership history
Rina Chikano	23 April 1993 (age 33)	11 June 2014	Transferred from AKB48; Graduated on 25 March 2018.	Yet to join group (24 February – 11 June 2014); Team KIII (11 June 2014 – 25 March 2018)
Saya Kawamoto	31 August 1998 (age 28)	15 September 2018	Member exchanged from AKB48; Returned on 19 October 2018.	Not assigned (15–16 September 2018); Team T (16 September – 19 October 2018)
Haruka Nakagawa	10 February 1992 (age 34)	1 November 2012	Transferred from AKB48; Graduated on 30 December 2016.	Not assigned (1 November – 23 December 2012); Team J (23 December 2012 – 31 July 2015); Team T (1 August 2015 – 30 November 2016); Team J (1–30 December 2016)
Aki Takajo	3 October 1991 (age 35)	1 November 2012	Transferred from AKB48; Concurrency dropped, returned on 24 February 2014.	Not assigned (1 November – 23 December 2012); Team J (23 December 2012 – 24 February 2014)

== Leadership history ==
Below is the timeline of leaderships within the group.

=== Group leadership ===
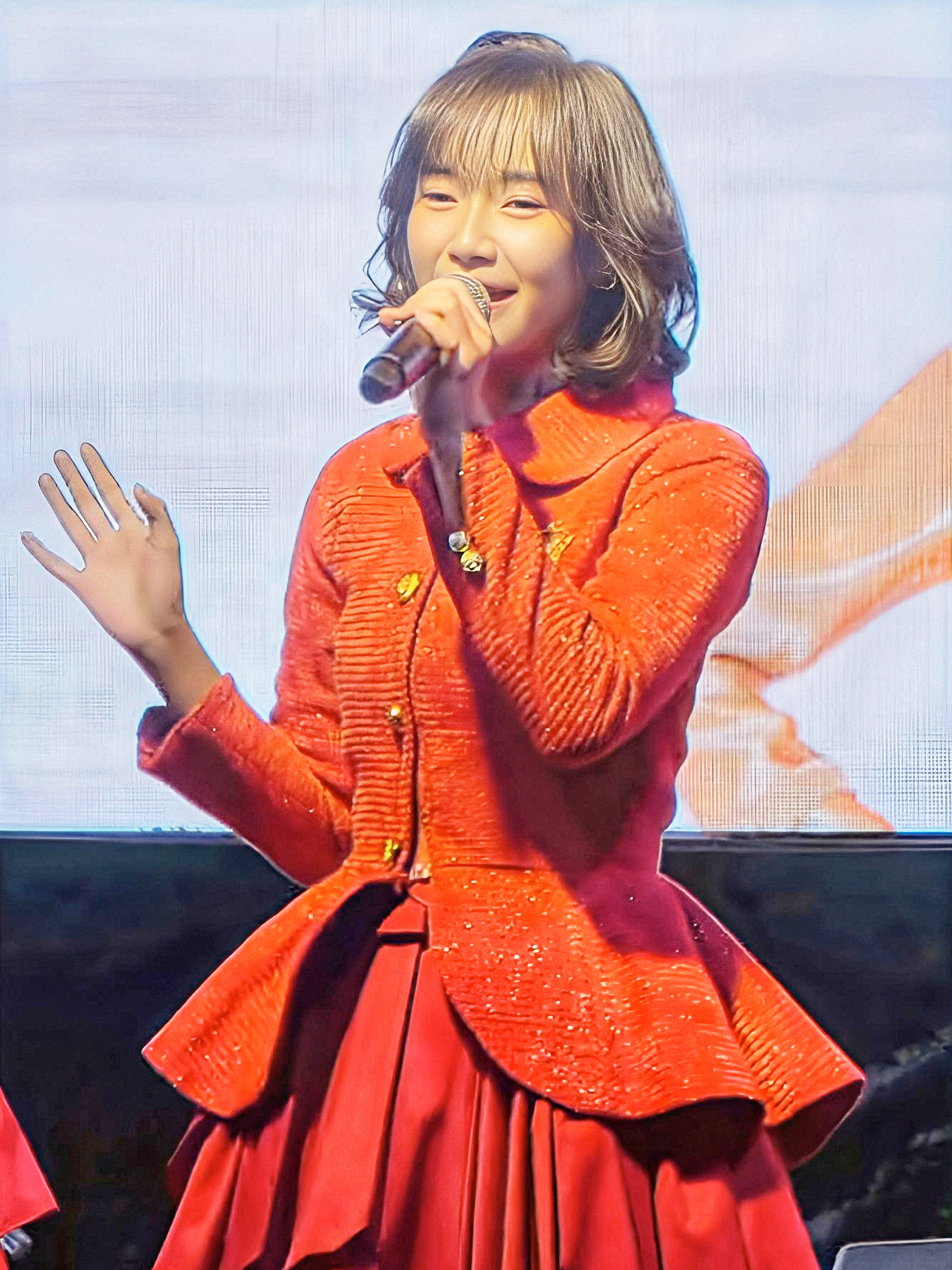
R.Rr. Freyanashifa Jayawardana is the group's first captain to have been born in the 21st century.

==== JKT48 captaincy ====
Name	Birth date	Date in office	Age at start date	Length (days)
Melody Nurramdhani Laksani	24 March 1992 (age 34)	21 December 2013 – 31 March 2018	21	1,561
Shania Junianatha	27 June 1998 (age 28)	1 April 2018 – 27 April 2019	19	391
Beby Chaesara Anadilla	18 March 1998 (age 28)	27 April 2019 – 21 February 2021	21	666
Gabriela Margaret Warouw	11 April 1998 (age 28)	22 February – 14 March 2021	22	20
Vacant		15 March – 18 December 2021	N/A	278
Shani Indira Natio	5 October 1998 (age 28)	18 December 2021 – 11 May 2024	23	875
Shania Gracia	31 August 1999 (age 27)	11 May 2024 – 27 December 2025	24	595
Raden Rara Freyanashifa Jayawardana	13 February 2006 (age 20)	28 December 2025 – present	19	303

==== JKT48 vice-captaincy ====
Name	Birth date	Date in office	Age at start date	Length (days)
Gabriela Margaret Warouw	11 April 1998 (age 28)	22 December 2019 – 21 February 2021	21	427
Vacant		22 February – 18 December 2021	N/A	299
Jinan Safa Safira	8 June 1999 (age 27)	18 December 2021 – 18 March 2023	22	455
Vacant		18 March 2023 – present	N/A	1,319

=== Teams leadership ===
==== Team J captaincy ====
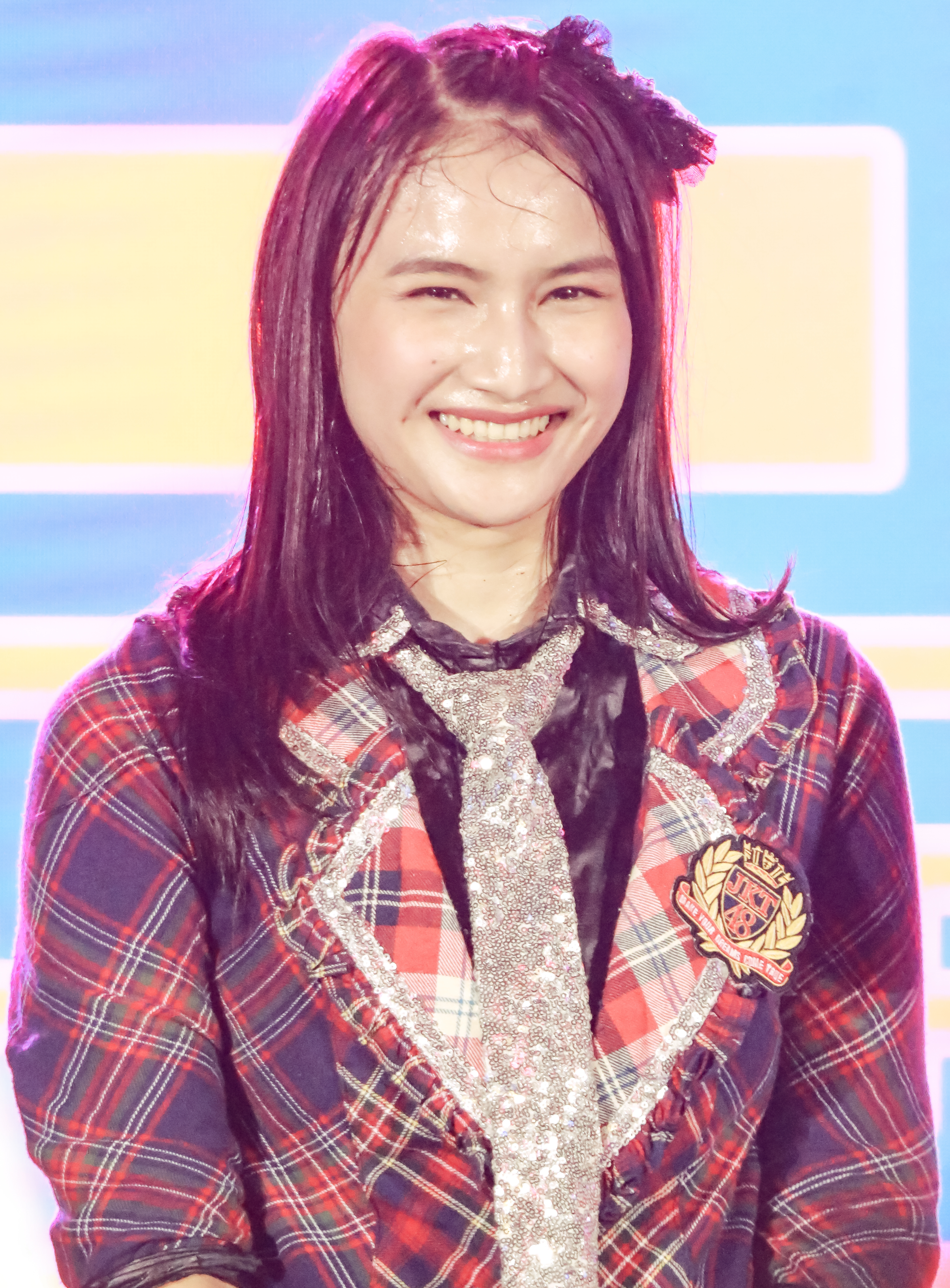
Frizka A. Laksani

Name	Birth date	Date in office	Age at start date	Length (days)
Devi Kinal Putri	2 January 1996 (age 30)	23 December 2012 – 31 July 2015	16	950
Shania Junianatha	27 June 1998 (age 28)	1 August 2015 – 31 March 2018	17	973
Priscillia Sari Dewi	5 April 1999 (age 27)	1 April – 7 June 2018	18	67
Vacant		7 June – 1 July 2018	N/A	24
Gabriela Margaret Warouw	11 April 1998 (age 28)	1 July 2018 – 6 June 2020	20	706
Frizka Anastasia Laksani	4 March 1996 (age 30)	6 June 2020 – 20 February 2021	24	259
Vacant		21 February – 14 March 2021	N/A	21

==== Team KIII captaincy ====
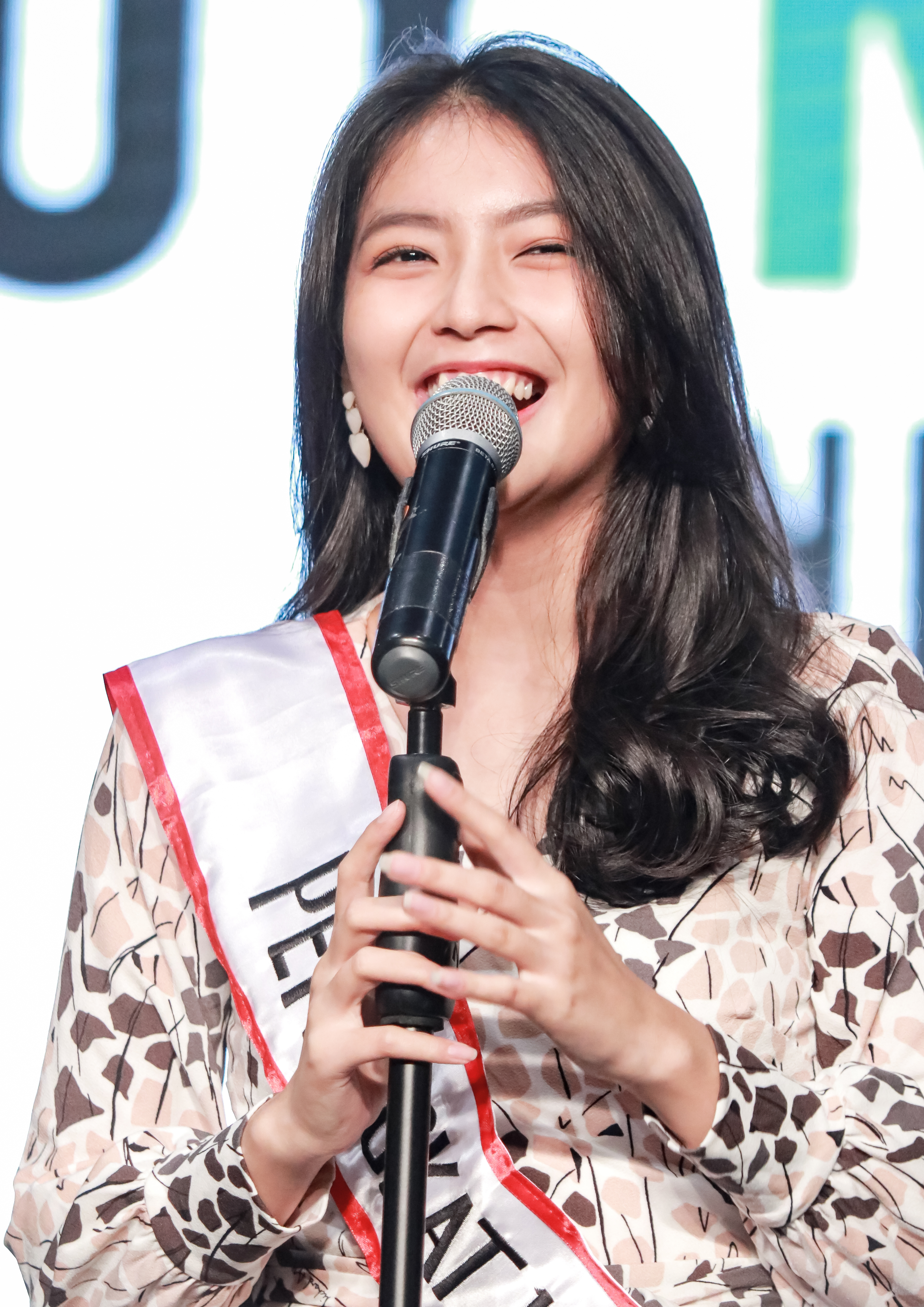
Shania Gracia was the last former team captain or vice-captain to leave the group.

Name	Birth date	Date in office	Age at start date	Length (days)
Vacant		25 June – 3 July 2013	N/A	8
Shinta Naomi	4 June 1994 (age 32)	3 July 2013 – 31 July 2015	19	758
Devi Kinal Putri	2 January 1996 (age 30)	1 August 2015 – 30 November 2016	19	487
Ratu Vienny Fitrilya	23 February 1996 (age 30)	1 December 2016 – 12 October 2017	20	315
Vacant		12 October 2017 – 31 January 2018	N/A	111
Viviyona Apriani	13 April 1994 (age 32)	1 February 2018 – 21 December 2019	23	688
Ratu Vienny Fitrilya	23 February 1996 (age 30)	22 December 2019 – 23 February 2020	23	63
Vacant		23 February – 6 June 2020	N/A	104
Shania Gracia	31 August 1999 (age 27)	6 June 2020 – 13 March 2021	20	280

==== Team T captaincy ====
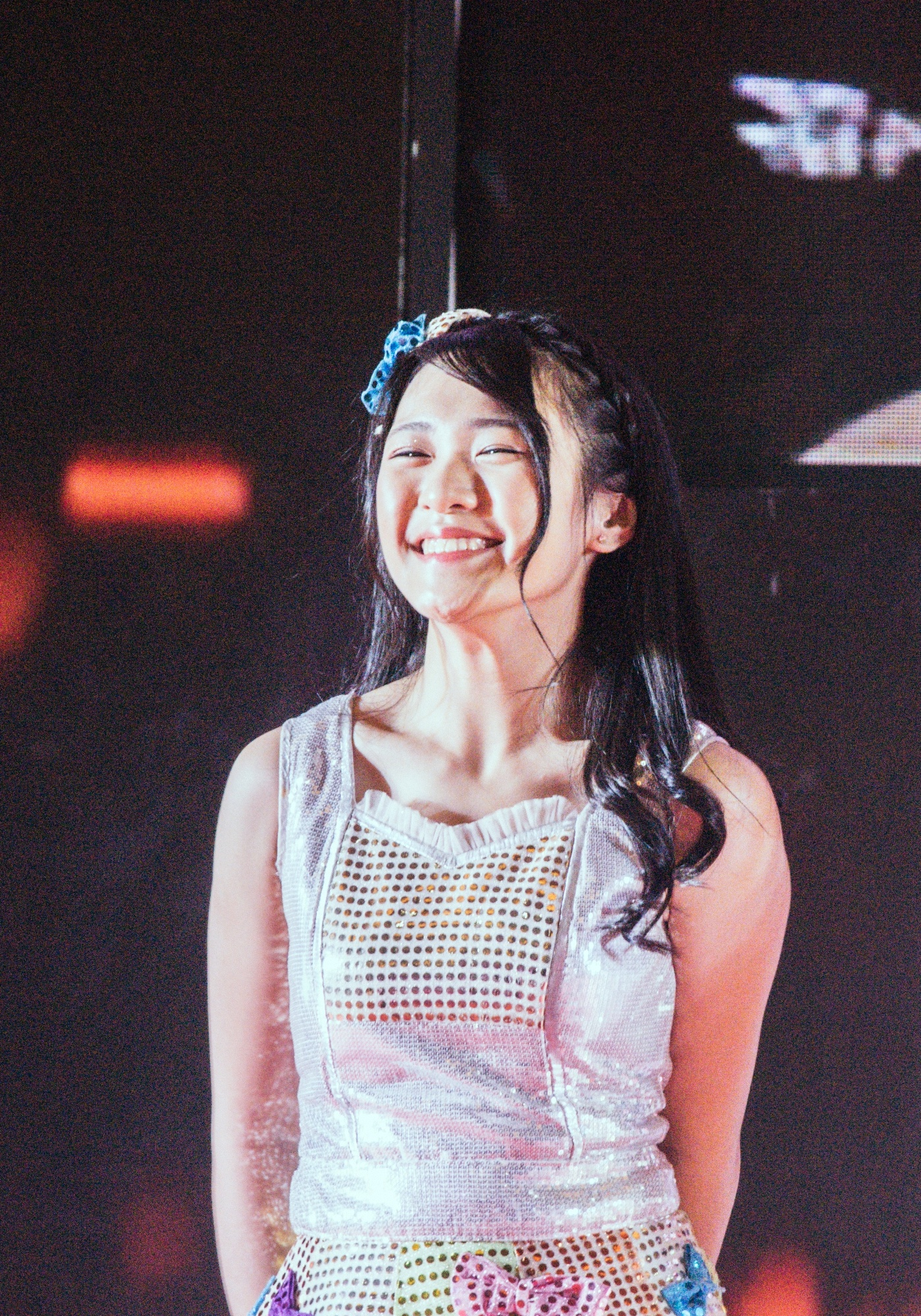
Tan Zhi Hui Celine

Name	Birth date	Date in office	Age at start date	Length (days)
Vacant		24 January – 31 July 2015	N/A	188
(Japan) Haruka Nakagawa	10 February 1992 (age 34)	1 August 2015 – 30 November 2016	23	487
Melody Nurramdhani Laksani	24 March 1992 (age 34)	1 December 2016 – 31 March 2018	24	485
(Japan) Ayana Shahab	3 June 1997 (age 29)	1 April 2018 – 8 December 2019	20	616
Vacant		9–31 December 2019	N/A	22
Team disbanded between 1 January and 22 August 2020 (234 days)
(Malaysia) Tan Zhi Hui Celine	21 August 2001 (age 25)	22 August 2020 – 12 March 2021	19	202

==== Team T vice-captaincy ====
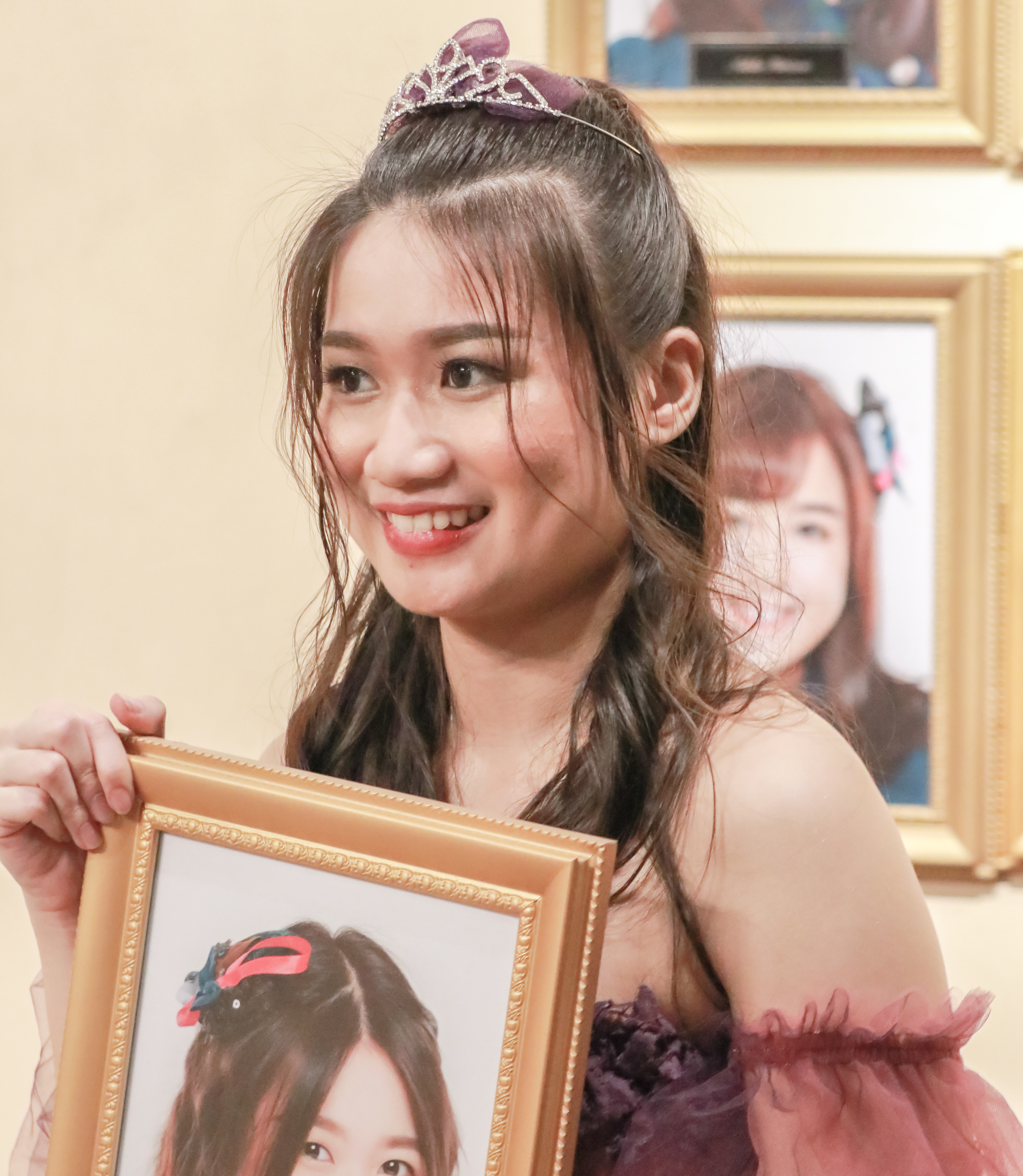
Sonia N. Winarto

Name	Birth date	Date in office	Age at start date	Length (days)
Sonia Natalia Winarto	17 December 1997 (age 28)	15 July 2018 – 7 December 2019	20	510
Vacant		8 December 2019 – 12 March 2021	N/A	460

== Longevity records ==
=== Longest tenure ===
Name	Generation	Tenure	Length (days)
Feni Fitriyanti	3rd	15 March 2014 – present	4609 (Note: As of 27 October 2026)
Shania Gracia	3rd	15 March 2014 – 27 December 2025	4305
Gabriela Margaret Warouw	1st	2 November 2011 – 14 August 2022	3938
Shani Indira Natio	3rd	15 March 2014 – 11 May 2024	3710

=== Shortest tenure ===
Name	Generation	Tenure	Length (days)
Kanya Caya	7th	29 September – 6 October 2018	7
Pipit Ananda	3rd	15–24 March 2014	9
Jihan Miftahul Jannah	6th	8–21 April 2018	13
Maegan Jovanka Andhita Putri	14th	14 February – 9 March 2026	23

== Age-related records ==
=== Oldest in group ===
Name	Generation	Birth date	Age when became oldest	Age when leaving (Current age if current holder)	Term	Length (days)	Reason for replacement
Allisa Astri	1st	23 June 1990	21 years, 132 days	21 years, 322 days	2 November 2011 – 10 May 2012	190	Contract terminated
Rica Leyona	1st	19 August 1991	20 years, 265 days	23 years, 110 days	10 May 2012 – 7 December 2014	941	Resigned
Haruka Nakagawa	3rd (AKB48)	10 February 1992	22 years, 301 days	24 years, 324 days	8 December 2014 – 30 December 2016	753	Graduated
Melody Nurramdhani Laksani	1st	24 March 1992	24 years, 282 days	26 years, 7 days	31 December 2016 – 31 March 2018	455	Graduated
Viviyona Apriani	2nd	13 April 1994	23 years, 353 days	25 years, 252 days	1 April 2018 – 21 December 2019	629	Graduated
Rona Ariesta Anggreani	2nd	19 March 1995	24 years, 278 days	25 years, 333 days	22 December 2019 – 15 February 2021	421	Graduated
Frizka Anastasia Laksani	1st	4 March 1996	24 years, 349 days	24 years, 353 days	16–20 February 2021	4	Graduated
Nurhayati	5th	18 October 1997	23 years, 126 days	23 years, 146 days	21 February – 13 March 2021	20	Graduated
Gabriela Margaret Warouw	1st	11 April 1998	22 years, 337 days	24 years, 125 days	14 March 2021 – 14 August 2022	518	Graduated
Shani Indira Natio	3rd	5 October 1998	23 years, 314 days	25 years, 219 days	15 August 2022 – 11 May 2024	635	Graduated
Feni Fitriyanti	3rd	16 January 1999	25 years, 116 days	27 years, 284 days	11 May 2024 – present	899	Incumbent

=== Youngest in group ===
Name	Generation	Birth date	Age when became youngest	Age when replaced (Current age if current holder)	Term	Length (days)	Reason for replacement
Nabilah Ratna Ayu Azalia	1st	11 November 1999	11 years, 356 days	14 years, 124 days	2 November 2011 – 15 March 2014	864	New recruitment
Kezia Putri Andinta	3rd	28 January 2001	13 years, 46 days	13 years, 298 days	15 March – 22 November 2014	252	Resigned
Syahfira Angela Nurhaliza	3rd	20 December 2000	13 years, 337 days	14 years, 147 days	22 November 2014 – 16 May 2015	175	New recruitment
Mega Suryani	4th	9 July 2002	12 years, 311 days	13 years, 114 days	16 May – 31 October 2015	168	Left
(Malaysia) Tan Zhi Hui Celine	4th	21 August 2001	14 years, 71 days	14 years, 281 days	31 October 2015 – 28 May 2016	210	New recruitment
Eve Antoinette Ichwan	5th	17 October 2003	12 years, 224 days	14 years, 173 days	28 May 2016 – 8 April 2018	680	New recruitment
Shalza Grasita	6th	7 October 2004	13 years, 183 days	13 years, 357 days	8 April – 29 September 2018	174	New recruitment
Aurel Mayori Putri	7th	14 May 2006	12 years, 138 days	12 years, 348 days	29 September 2018 – 27 April 2019	210	New recruitment
Cindy Nugroho	8th	9 June 2007	11 years, 322 days	12 years, 175 days	27 April – 1 December 2019	218	New recruitment
Caithlyn Gwyneth Santoso	9th	26 March 2009	10 years, 250 days	11 years, 350 days	1 December 2019 – 11 March 2021	466	Graduated
Kathrina Irene Indarto Putri	9th	26 July 2006	14 years, 229 days	15 years, 145 days	12 March – 18 December 2021	282	New recruitment
Raisha Syifa Wardhana	10th	11 November 2007	14 years, 37 days	14 years, 354 days	18 December 2021 – 31 October 2022	317	New recruitment
Gendis Mayrannisa Setiawan	11th	23 June 2010	12 years, 130 days	13 years, 148 days	31 October 2022 – 18 November 2023	383	New recruitment
Jazzlyn Agatha Trisha Indra Putri	12th	16 February 2011	12 years, 275 days	13 years, 258 days	18 November 2023 – 31 October 2024	348	New recruitment
Humaira Ramadhani Salfiandi	13th	13 August 2011	13 years, 79 days	14 years, 185 days	31 October 2024 – 14 February 2026	471	New recruitment
Afera Thalia Putri Eysteinn	14th	20 October 2012 (age 14)	13 years, 117 days	14 years, 7 days	14 February 2026 – present	255	Incumbent

== Bibliography ==
- Ogino, Toshiyuki; Ohira, Akira (2012). Uchino, Emi; Kuriyama, Haruka; Iwasaki, Haruka (eds.). Love JKT48: The 1st Official Guide Book. Jakarta: Dunia Otomotifindo Mediatama. ISBN 978-979-23-5755-4.
