= Rapsodi =

Rapsodi may refer to:

- Rapsodi, a genre of traditional music in Kosovo
- Rapsodi (Olamide album), a 2011 album by Olamide
- Rapsodi, a 2006 album by Kirsten Johnson, Çesk Zadeja, and Feim Ibrahimi
- "Rapsodi", a 1975 composition by Inger Wikström
- "Rapsodi", a 2020 song and single by JKT48
