= JKT48 single's members election =

Annual event held by idol group JKT48

JKT48 single's members election is an annual event held by idol group JKT48 to determine the selected members who would participate in a single. It was held annually since 2014. Originally held between March and May, in 2018 and 2019 it was held between September and November.

As a result of the COVID-19 pandemic in Indonesia during most of 2020, the annual election was not held for the first time. It was then held again in late 2024.

== 2014 ==
JKT48 6th Single's Members Election
- Date: 5 March – 22 April 2014 (voting period); 26 April 2014 (final results announcement)
- Presenters: Irgi Ahmad Fahrezi; Christie Julia
- Venue: ANTV Epicentrum Studio Complex, South Jakarta, Jakarta Capital Special Region
- Broadcaster: antv
- Entrants: 40 members (initial); 71 members (final)
- Winner: Melody Nurramdhani Laksani (Team J)

JKT48 6th Single's Members Election (Indonesian: Pemilihan Member Single ke-6 JKT48) was a chain of annual event to determine the selected members who would participate in the JKT48's 6th single. This event was the first edition, following the same event held by AKB48 and its local sister groups. The election determined the top 16 members with the most votes to fill 16 positions on two songs; the top 16 (Japanese: senbatsu (選抜)) would be featured in the main single. The order of blocking (dancing position) was determined by the result of the vote from the fans. In this case, the number one position would place the member as the center on the single. The election result was revealed at the ANTV Epicentrum Studio Complex in South Jakarta and broadcast live on antv on 26 April 2014. The event was emceed by Irgi Ahmad Fahrezi, former host of Indonesian series of Idols, Indonesian Idol in first and second seasons, and Christie Julia. All 40 of JKT48 members active as of 5 March 2014 participated. On 25 March, all 31 remaining members from the newly-introduced third generation members entered the contest.

The top 16 members were featured in the single "Gingham Check", released on 11 June 2014.

=== Timeline ===
- 5 March 2014: Voting period opened for serial numbers obtained from JKT48 single "Flying Get", JKT48 Official Fan Club privilege, and ballots distributed after every theater show.
- 15 March 2014: First round results announcement
- 16–22 March 2014: Voting period for serial numbers obtained by downloading the said single in the official mobile content menu.
- 25 March 2014: Second round results announcement
- 23 April 2014, midnight: Voting period closed at all
- 26 April 2014: Final results announcement

=== Candidates ===
All 40 JKT48 members active as of 5 March 2014 participated. On 25 March, all 31 remaining members from the newly-introduced third generation members entered the contest, making the number of candidates up to 71. As she was yet to officially join the group, AKB48 newly transferred-in member Rina Chikano did not participate in the election.

=== Election results ===
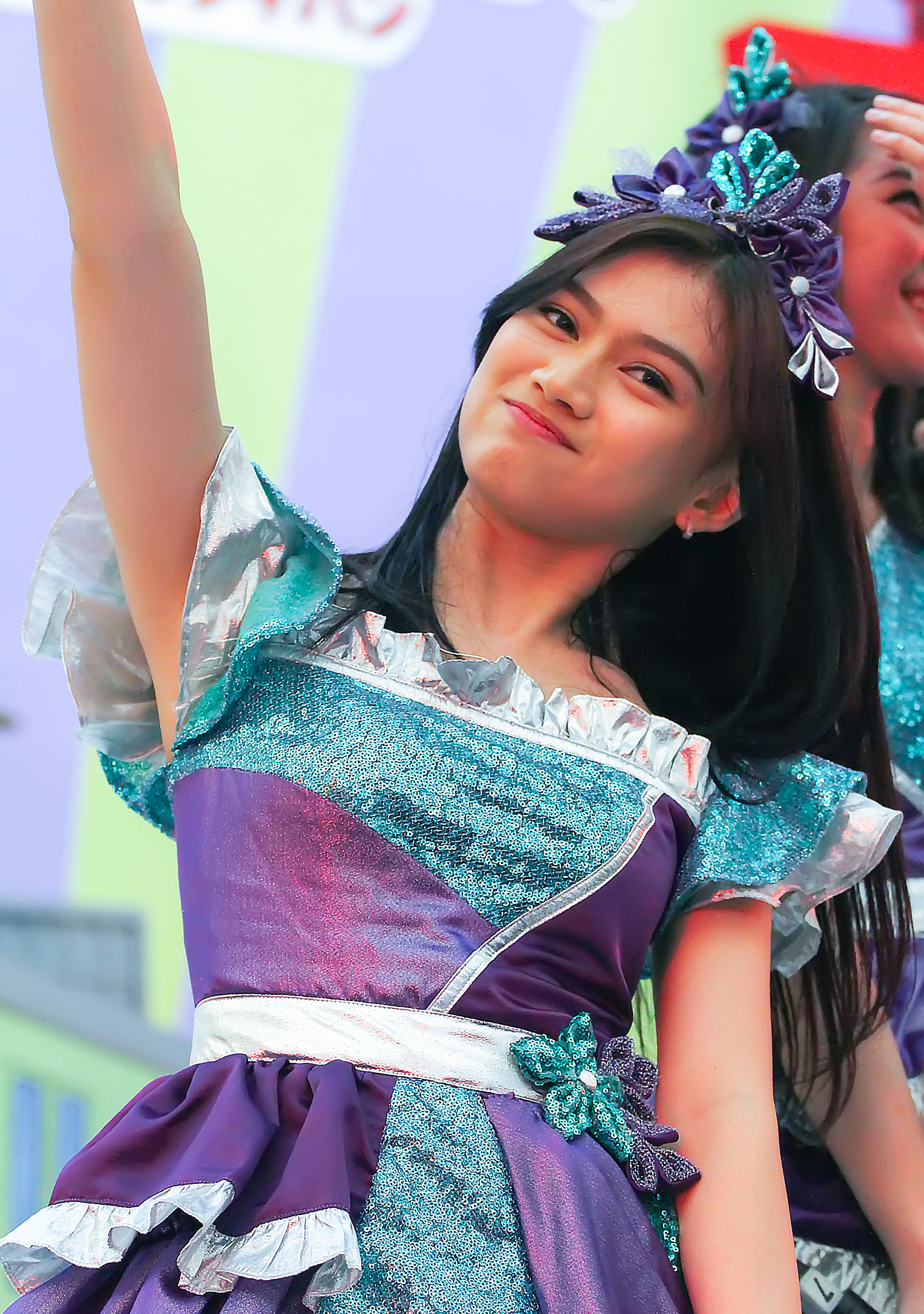
Melody Nurramdhani Laksani, the election winner

Final rank	Name	Team	Popular vote	Second preliminary result		First preliminary result	
Final rank	Name	Team	Popular vote	Popular vote	Rank	Popular vote	Rank
1	Melody Nurramdhani Laksani	J	14,541	7,969	1	475	1
2	Jessica Veranda	J	13,285	6,465	2	370	7
3	Haruka Nakagawa	J	13,276	2,718	14	460	2
4	Shania Junianatha	J	12,859	2,741	13	342	8
5	Beby Chaesara Anadila	J	12,015	6,059	3	415	4
6	Nabilah Ratna Ayu Azalia	J	11,872	2,587	15	371	6
7	Rica Leyona	J	11,732	5,914	5	N/A	N/A
8	Devi Kinal Putri	J	10,031	6,013	4	396	5
9	Ghaida Farisya	J	9,044	4,156	7	239	14
10	Viviyona Apriani	KIII	8,917	4,439	6	N/A	N/A
11	Ratu Vienny Fitrilya	KIII	7,149	2,980	10	434	3
12	Cindy Yuvia	KIII	6,669	N/A	N/A	254	11
13	Thalia	KIII	6,290	2,934	11	N/A	N/A
14	Ayana Shahab	J	6,259	N/A	N/A	340	9
15	Jennifer Hanna	KIII	5,144	3,015	8	N/A	N/A
16	Jessica Vania	J	4,718	2,995	9	242	13
nr	Rona Anggreani	KIII	N/A	2,797	12	N/A	N/A
nr	Lidya Maulida Djuhandar	KIII	N/A	2,316	16	N/A	N/A
nr	Thalia Ivanka Elizabeth	J	N/A	N/A	N/A	338	10
nr	Sinka Juliani	KIII	N/A	N/A	N/A	246	12
nr	Sendy Ariani	J	N/A	N/A	N/A	238	15
nr	Saktia Oktapyani	Trainee	N/A	N/A	N/A	211	16

=== Post-election ===
- Melody Nurramdhani Laksani became the center of a JKT48 single for the fifth time. By winning this election, she centered five out of the six JKT48 singles at the time.
- Until 2024, Saktia Oktapyani was the only member to ever enter the table as a "Trainee" in any phase, entering only in the first preliminary result.

== 2015 ==
JKT48 10th Single's Members Election
- Date: 27 March – 30 April 2015 (voting period); 2 May 2015 (final results announcement)
- Presenters: Adi Nugroho; Tiffany Orie
- Venue: Tanah Airku Theater, Taman Mini Indonesia Indah, East Jakarta, Jakarta Capital Special Region
- Broadcaster: NET
- Entrants: 64 members
- Winner: Jessica Veranda (Team J)

JKT48 10th Single's Members Election (Indonesian: Pemilihan Member Single ke 10 JKT48) was a chain of annual event to determine the selected members who would participate in the 10th single of idol group JKT48. This event was the second edition and the first to feature members ranked 17th to 32nd. It followed the same event held by AKB48 and its local sister groups. The election determined the top 32 members with the most votes to fill 32 positions on two songs; the top 16 (Japanese: senbatsu (選抜)) would be featured in the main single and the rest on the coupling song. The order of blocking (dancing position) was determined by the result of the vote from the fans. In this case, the number one position would place the member as the center on the single. The election result was revealed at Tanah Airku Theater, inside the Taman Mini Indonesia Indah in East Jakarta, on 2 May 2015. It was broadcast live on NET and hosted by Adi Nugroho, former host of Indonesian version of La Academia, Akademi Fantasi Indosiar, and Tiffany Orie, contestant of Indonesian Idol in fifth season.

The top 16 members were featured in JKT48's 10th single, "Refrain Penuh Harapan" and the members ranked 17th to 32nd sang the B-side "Value Milikku Saja"; the recording was released on 27 May 2015.

=== Timeline ===
- 27 March 2015: Voting period opened for serial numbers obtained from JKT48 single "Pareo wa Emerald", JKT48 Official Fan Club privilege, and ballots distributed after every theater show.
- 7 April 2015: First round results announcement
- 8–12 April 2015: Voting period for serial numbers obtained by downloading the said single in the official mobile content menu.
- 14 April 2015: Second round results announcement
- 1 May 2015, midnight: Voting period closed at all
- 2 May 2015: Final results announcement

=== Categorization ===
The top 16 would sing the main single, while members ranked 17th to 32nd, called Under Girls, would sing the B-side.

=== Candidates ===
All 64 JKT48 members active as of 27 March 2015 participated. This, as of the 2024 election, remains the only time when all of the group's active members were participating throughout the entire election process.

=== Election results ===
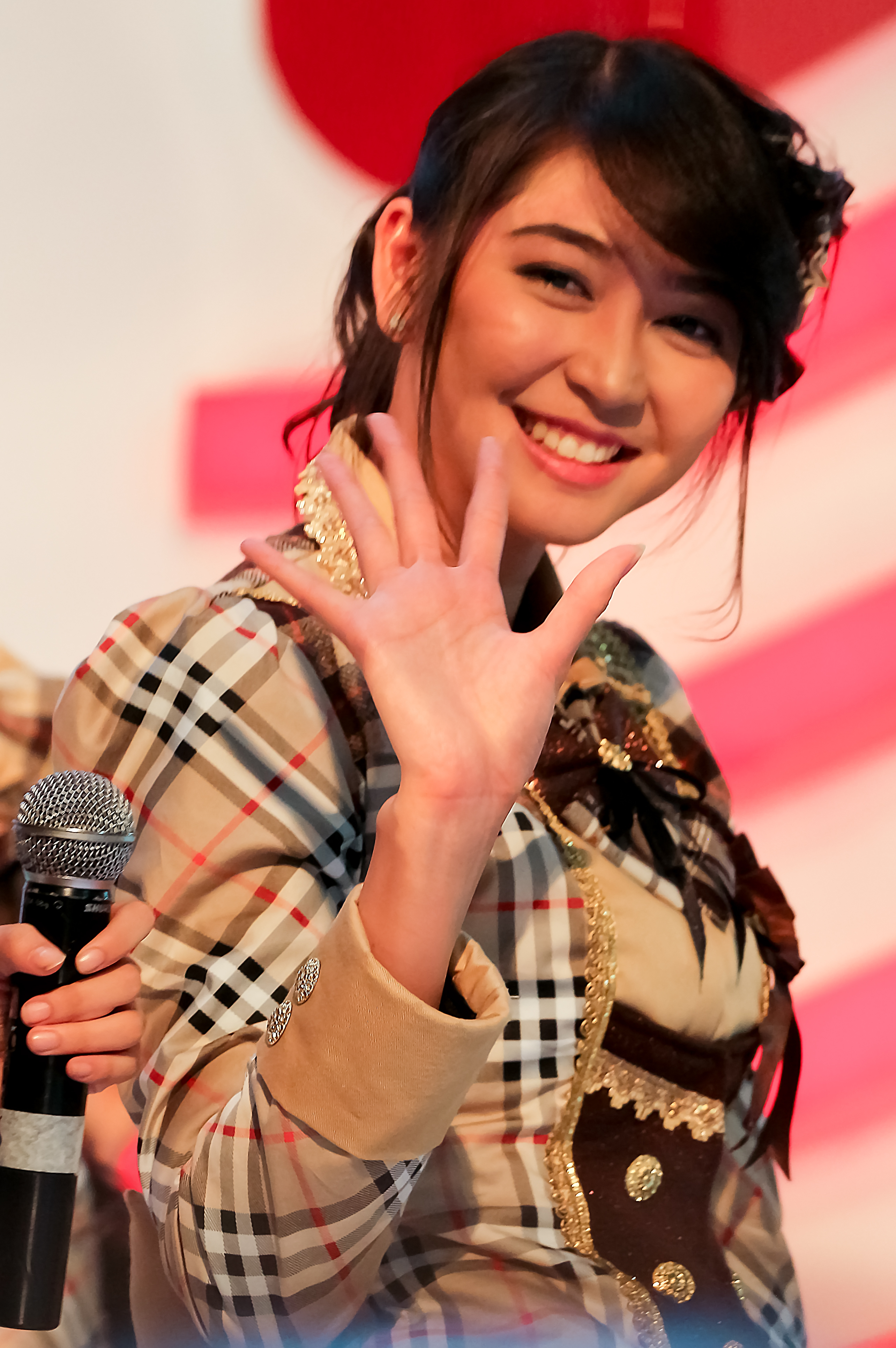
Jessica Veranda, the election winner

Final rank	Name	Team	Popular vote	Progress from 2014	Second preliminary result		First preliminary result	
Final rank	Name	Team	Popular vote	Progress from 2014	Popular vote	Rank	Popular vote	Rank
1	Jessica Veranda	J	22,404	▲1	9,567	2	1,693	4
2	Haruka Nakagawa	J	21,882	▲1	3,440	13	1,044	12
3	Melody Nurramdhani Laksani	J	20,107	▼2	10,180	1	840	17
4	Andela Yuwono	T	17,610	New entry	4,395	10	1,593	4
5	Devi Kinal Putri	J	16,574	▲3	7,126	4	616	25
6	Shania Junianatha	J	15,984	▼2	7,695	3	1,361	7
7	Ratu Vienny Fitrilya	KIII	15,875	▲4	4,355	11	1,232	8
8	Priscillia Sari Dewi	KIII	15,188	New entry	6,293	6	2,727	1
9	Cindy Yuvia	KIII	14,919	▲3	3,422	14	759	22
10	Nabilah Ratna Ayu Azalia	J	14,853	▼4	6,335	5	1,167	10
11	Riskha Fairunissa	KIII	14,846	New entry	4,498	9	2,580	2
12	Beby Chaesara Anadila	J	13,105	▼7	3,154	20	760	21
13	Ghaida Farisya	J	12,908	▼4	5,152	7	676	23
14	Ayana Shahab	J	12,631	0	3,045	21	763	20
15	Sendy Ariani	J	12,585	New entry	4,645	8	1997	3
16	Gabriela Margareth Warouw	J	11,959	New entry	3,267	18	1,019	14
17	Elaine Hartanto	T	10,861	New entry	3,418	15	1,536	6
18	Rina Chikano	KIII	10,276	New entry	3,850	12	1,147	11
19	Frieska Anastasia Laksani	J	10,025	New entry	3,004	22	1,168	9
20	Michelle Christo Kusnadi	T	8,106	New entry	2,205	31	672	24
21	Rona Anggreani	KIII	7,517	New entry	3,233	19	766	19
22	Thalia	KIII	6,327	▼9	2,864	25	792	18
23	Jennifer Hanna	KIII	5,852	▼8	2,487	27	600	26
24	Shinta Naomi	KIII	5,624	New entry	2,720	26	897	16
25	Viviyona Apriani	KIII	5,505	▼15	3,349	16	540	28
26	Jessica Vania	J	5,332	▼10	2,885	24	N/A	N/A
27	Sinka Juliani	KIII	5,111	New entry	2,108	32	547	27
28	Dwi Putri Bonita	KIII	4,999	New entry	2,395	28	329	31
29	Maria Genoveva Natalia; Desy Purnamasari Gunawan	T	4,866	New entry	3,291	17	912	15
30	Rezky Wiranti Dhike	J	4,420	New entry	2,904	23	1,031	13
31	Lidya Maulida Djuhandar	KIII	4,005	New entry	2,231	30	433	30
32	Shani Indira Natio	T	3,710	New entry	2,331	29	N/A	N/A
nr	Ayu Safira Oktaviani	T	N/A	Steady	N/A	N/A	485	29
nr	Aninditha Rahma Cahyadi	T	N/A	Steady	N/A	N/A	307	32

=== Post-election ===
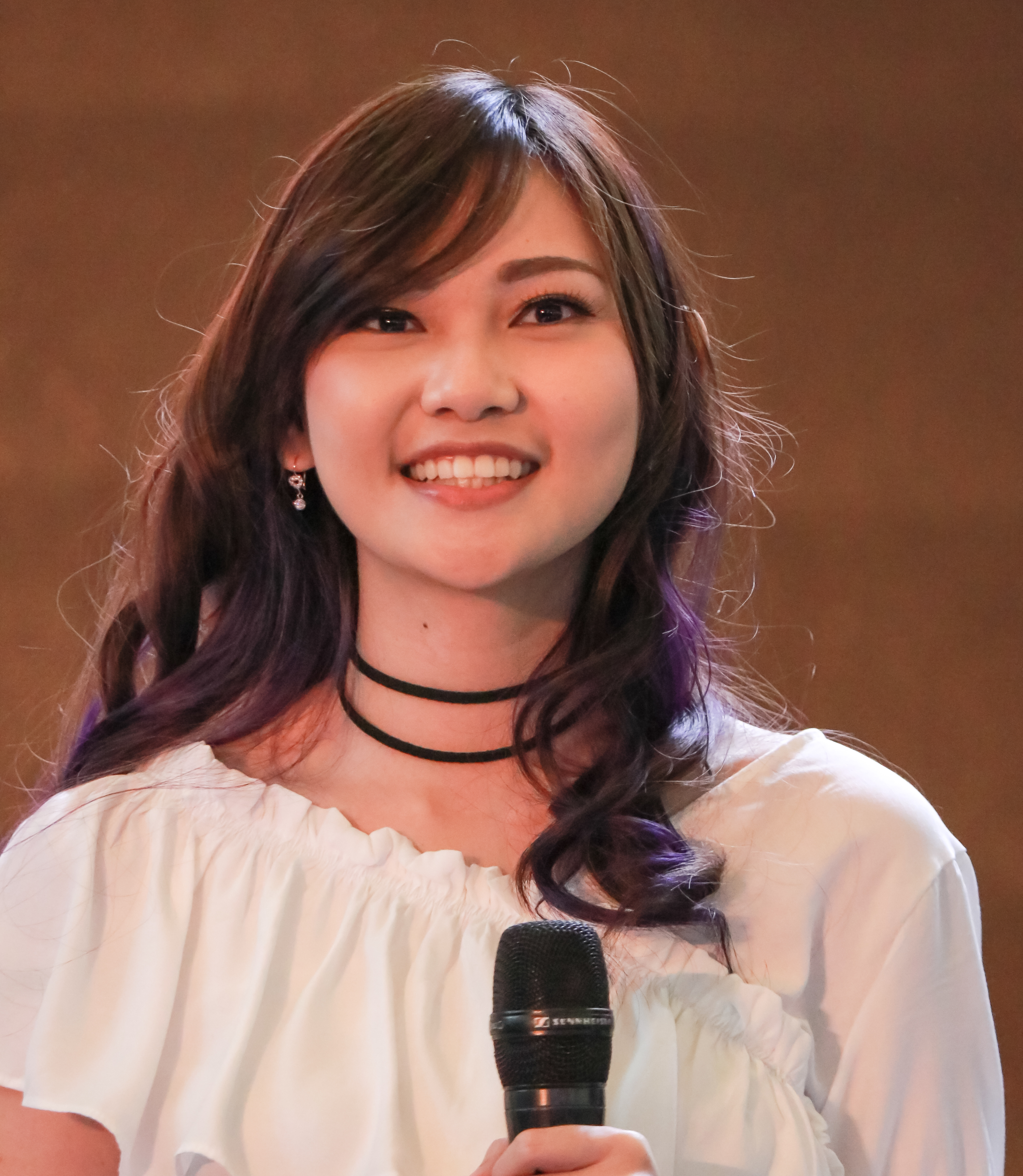
Andela Yuwono

- Jessica Veranda solely became the center of a JKT48 single for the first time.
- Haruka Nakagawa recorded the highest finish for a non-Indonesian member (2nd).
- Andela Yuwono became the highest-ranked new entry and the highest-ranked non-Team J member by finishing fourth. Remarkably, this was only her second election participation and first full cycle election, having entered the election halfway through in 2014. This would be her last Senbatsu, as she resigned from the group later that year.
- For the first time there were more than one non-Indonesian member in the top 32: Nakagawa and Rina Chikano.
- Ayana Shahab became the first member to have a steady rank compared to the previous election (14th).
- The 7-vote gap between Nabilah Ratna Ayu Azalia and Riskha Fairunissa broke the record for tightest margin set in the previous year between Nakagawa and 2nd-placed Jessica Veranda (9 points).
- Seventeen out of the top 32 members were new entries; the most in any JKT48 election until 2024. Twelve of them went to Under Girls, also the most in such election.
- Five members made their first top 16 (and top 32) finish: Andela Yuwono, Priscillia Sari Dewi, Riskha Fairunissa, Sendy Ariani, and Gabriela Margareth Warouw. Only the first two were making their Senbatsu debut.
- Members with all-time high rank after this election (ever ranked at least twice) were Jessica Veranda, Haruka Nakagawa, Devi Kinal Putri, Ratu Vienny Fitrilya, Cindy Yuvia, Priscillia Sari Dewi, Michelle Christo Kusnadi, Gabriela Margareth Warouw, Sinka Juliani, Shinta Naomi, and Shani Indira Natio.
- Members with all-time low rank after this election (ever ranked at least twice) were Melody Nurramdhani Laksani, Shania Junianatha, Nabilah Ratna Ayu Azalia, Beby Chaesara Anadila, Ghaida Farisya, Thalia, Jennifer Hanna, Viviyona Apriani, and Jessica Vania.

== 2016 ==
JKT48 13th Single's Members Election
- Date: 23 March – 5 May 2016 (voting period); 7 May 2016 (final results announcement)
- Presenters: Adi Nugroho; Reinita Arlin
- Venue: Gelora Bung Karno Stadium, Central Jakarta, Jakarta Capital Special Region
- Broadcaster: RTV
- Entrants: 60 members
- Winner: Jessica Veranda (Team J)
- Slogan: Membuat Perubahan (Make A Change)

JKT48 13th Single's Members Election (Indonesian: Pemilihan Member Single ke-13 JKT48) was a chain of event to determine the selected members who would participate in the 13th single of idol group JKT48. This event was the third edition, having been held annually since 2014. The election determined the top 32 members with the most votes to fill 32 positions on two songs; the top 16 (Japanese: senbatsu (選抜)) would be featured in the main single and the rest on the coupling song. The order of blocking (dancing position) was determined by the result of the vote from the fans. In this case, the number one position would place the member as the center on the single. The election result was revealed at the Gelora Bung Karno Stadium in Central Jakarta on 7 May 2016 and broadcast live on RTV. The event was emceed by Adi Nugroho, who had been emceed the same event previously, and Reinita Arlin. This was one of the last events hosted by the stadium before its closure for renovation due to the 2018 Asian Games.

The top 16 members were featured in JKT48's 13th single, "Hanya Lihat ke Depan" and the members ranked 17th to 32nd sang the B-side "Tidak Boleh Pelukan"; the recording was released on 1 June 2016.

=== Timeline ===
- 23 March 2016: Voting period opened for serial numbers obtained from JKT48 album Mahagita, JKT48 Official Fan Club privilege, and ballots distributed after every theater show.
- 6 April 2016: First round results announcement
- 7–17 April 2016: Voting period for serial numbers obtained by downloading the said album in the official mobile content menu.
- 15 April 2016: Second round results announcement
- 6 May 2016, midnight: Voting period closed at all
- 7 May 2016: Final results announcement

=== Categorization ===
The top 16 would sing the main single, while members ranked 17th to 32nd, called Under Girls, would sing the B-side.

=== Candidates ===
Sixty of 64 JKT48 members active as of 23 March 2016 participated. Five members had announced their graduation earlier that year and all but Haruka Nakagawa did not participate in the election. Three of them would eventually leave the group amid the election process.

=== Election results ===
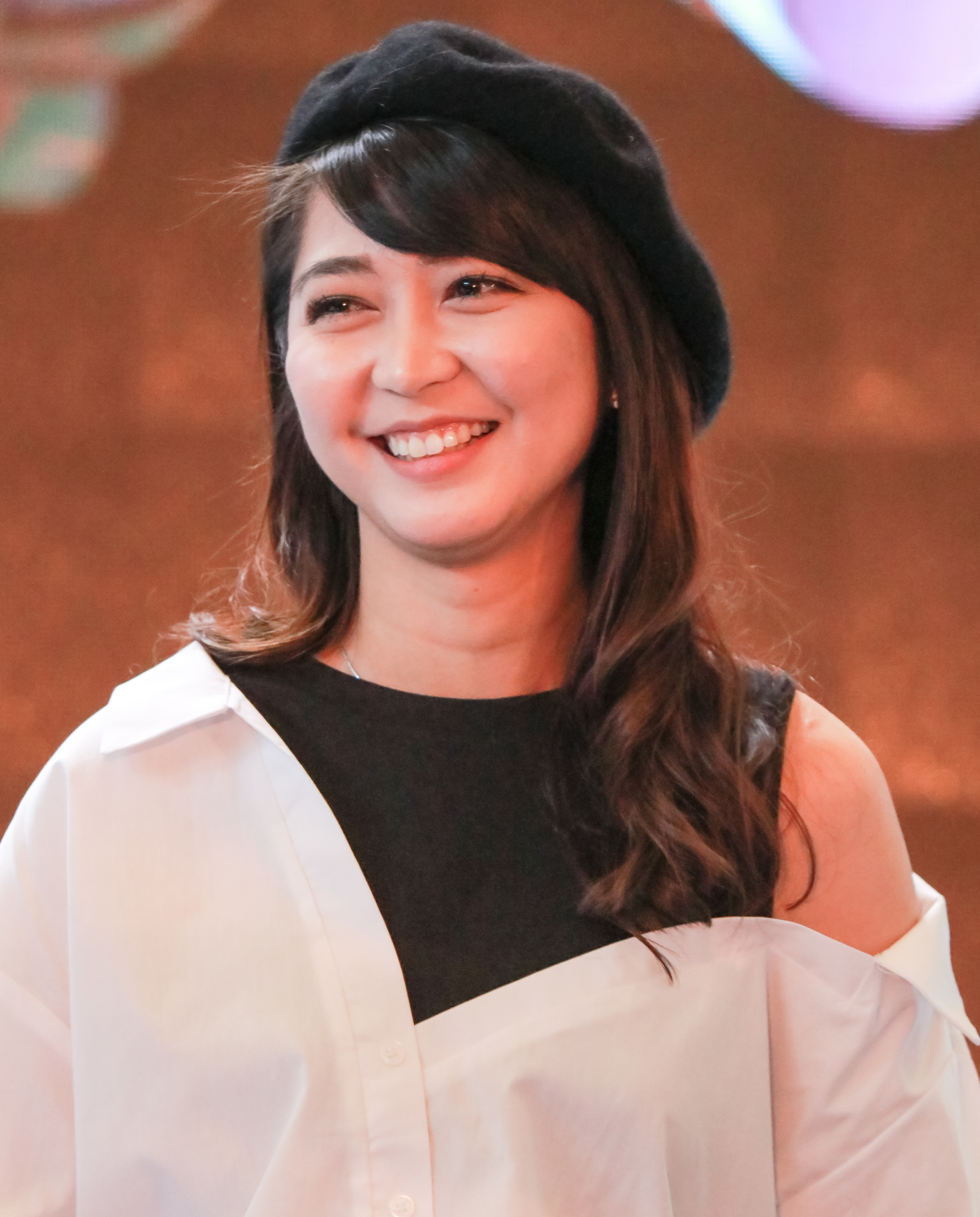
Jessica Veranda, the election winner

Final rank	Name	Team	Popular vote	Progress from 2015	Second preliminary result		First preliminary result	
Final rank	Name	Team	Popular vote	Progress from 2015	Popular vote	Rank	Popular vote	Rank
1	Jessica Veranda	J	42,005	0	11,256	3	2,920	5
2	Ghaida Farisya	J	41,918	▲11	16,116	1	6,371	1
3	Haruka Nakagawa	T	40,413	▼1	5,244	12	1,431	18
4	Cindy Yuvia	KIII	27,008	▲5	10,897	4	1,299	21
5	Melody Nurramdhani Laksani	J	25,679	▼2	5,733	10	1,501	15
6	Shania Junianatha	J	25,532	0	9,912	5	1,515	14
7	Priscillia Sari Dewi	KIII	25,521	▲1	8,791	6	N/A	N/A
8	Nabilah Ratna Ayu Azalia	J	23,992	▲2	4,397	16	1,701	12
9	Rina Chikano	KIII	23,897	▲9	12,027	2	4,378	2
10	Devi Kinal Putri	KIII	20,022	▼5	3,620	19	644	28
11	Shania Gracia	T	19,782	New entry	5,798	9	nr	N/A
12	Michelle Christo Kusnadi	T	19,683	▲8	4,543	15	1,761	11
13	Gabriela Margareth Warouw	J	19,659	▲3	N/A	N/A	N/A	N/A
14	Dena Siti Rohyati	J	17,312	New entry	6,343	8	N/A	N/A
15	Dwi Putri Bonita	KIII	17,157	▲13	4,584	14	1,113	24
16	Thalia Ivanka Elizabeth	J	16,011	New entry	4,052	18	2,233	8
17	Sinka Juliani	KIII	15,988	▲10	2,531	27	1,455	16
18	Saktia Oktapyani	KIII	15,383	New entry	4,153	17	2,678	6
19	Ayana Shahab	J	15,202	▼5	N/A	N/A	N/A	N/A
20	Nadila Cindi Wantari	KIII	15,130	New entry	5,441	11	3,232	4
21	Riskha Fairunissa	KIII	13,004	▼10	3,487	22	1,877	10
22	Beby Chaesara Anadila	J	12,862	▼10	2,901	25	N/A	N/A
23	Shinta Naomi	J	12,592	▲1	6,347	7	3,716	3
24	Natalia	KIII	9,808	New entry	3,573	21	2,482	7
25	Sendy Ariani	J	8,257	▼10	3,076	24	1,526	13
26	Shani Indira Natio	T	8,221	▲6	3,611	20	667	27
27	Ni Made Ayu Vania Aurellia	T	8,213	New entry	3,420	23	1,132	23
28	Della Delila	KIII	8,173	New entry	2,276	30	1,444	17
29	Ratu Vienny Fitrilya	KIII	8,165	▼22	2,317	29	861	25
30	Viviyona Apriani	KIII	8,147	▼5	N/A	N/A	N/A	N/A
31	Jessica Vania	J	8,133	▼5	2,164	32	542	32
32	Nadhifa Salsabila	T	8,130	New entry	4,878	13	1,310	20
nr	Syahfira Angela Nurhaliza	T	N/A	Steady	2,876	26	2,196	9
nr	Jennifer Hanna	KIII	N/A	▼ ≥10	2,473	28	1,256	22
nr	Alicia Chanzia	KIII	N/A	Steady	2,214	31	1,422	19
nr	Frieska Anastasia Laksani	J	N/A	▼ ≥14	N/A	N/A	767	26
nr	Feni Fitriyanti	T	N/A	Steady	N/A	N/A	635	29
nr	Rona Anggreani	KIII	N/A	▼ ≥12	N/A	N/A	599	30
nr	Aninditha Rahma Cahyadi	T	N/A	Steady	N/A	N/A	597	31

=== Post-election ===
- Jessica Veranda became the first member to be reelected as center.
- Haruka Nakagawa became the first and—as of the 2024 election—only member to contest the election after her graduation announcement. She also became the then-highest ranked non-Team J member by finishing third.
- For the first time there were more than one foreign member in the top 16: Nakagawa and Rina Chikano (both Japanese).
- Nadhifa Salsabila became the most-voted bottom-rank member, obtaining 8,130 votes. The 3-point gap between her and 31st-placed Jessica Vania broke the record for tightest margin set in the previous year between Nabilah Ratna Ayu Azalia and Riskha Fairunissa (7 points).
- Nine out of the top 32 members were new entries; the then-least in any JKT48 election. Six went to Under Girls, three went to the Senbatsu, the then-record low for both in such election.
- Six members made their first top 16 finish: Rina Chikano, Shania Gracia, Michelle Christo Kusnadi, Dena Siti Rohyati, Dwi Putri Bonita, and Thalia Ivanka Elizabeth. Gracia, Dena, and Thalia Ivanka made their first top 32 finish; the first two and Putri Bonita were making their Senbatsu debut. This would be the only Senbatsu appearance for the Dena and Putri Bonita.
- Members with all-time high rank after this election (ever ranked at least twice) were Ghaida Farisya, Cindy Yuvia, Priscillia Sari Dewi, Rina Chikano, Michelle Christo Kusnadi, Gabriela Margareth Warouw, Sinka Juliani, Shinta Naomi, and Shani Indira Natio.
- Members with all-time low rank after this election (ever ranked at least twice) were Haruka Nakagawa (joint-worst), Melody Nurramdhani Laksani, Shania Junianatha (joint-worst), Devi Kinal Putri, Ayana Shahab, Riskha Fairunissa, Beby Chaesara Anadila, Sendy Ariani, Ratu Vienny Fitrilya, Viviyona Apriani, and Jessica Vania.

== 2017 ==
JKT48 17th Single's Members Election
- Date: 8 March – 20 April 2017 (voting period); 22 April 2017 (final results announcement)
- Presenters: Adi Nugroho; Rey Utami
- Venue: Balai Sarbini, South Jakarta, Jakarta Capital Special Region
- Broadcaster: RTV
- Entrants: 64 members
- Winner: Shani Indira Natio (Team KIII)
- Slogan: Siapa yang Akan Membuat Zaman Baru? (Who Will Make the New Age?)

JKT48 17th Single's Members Election (Indonesian: Pemilihan Member Single ke-17 JKT48) was a chain of event to determine the selected members who would participate in the 17th single of idol group JKT48. This event was the fourth edition, having been held annually since 2014. The election determined the top 32 members with the most votes to fill 32 positions on two songs; the top 16 (Japanese: senbatsu (選抜)) would be featured in the main single and the rest on the coupling song. The order of blocking (dancing position) was determined by the result of the vote from the fans. In this case, the number one position would place the member as the center on the single. The election result was revealed at the Balai Sarbini in South Jakarta on 22 April 2017 and broadcast live on RTV. The event was emceed by Adi Nugroho – who had emceed the two previous elections result announcement – and Rey Utami.

The top 16 members were featured in JKT48's 17th single, "Indahnya Senyum Manismu..." and the members ranked 17th to 32nd sang the B-side "Sedikit Saja I Love You!"; the recording was released in music card on 8 June 2017 and in CD-DVD on 4 August 2017.

=== Timeline ===
- 8 March 2017: Voting period opened for serial numbers obtained from JKT48 single "So Long!", greatest hits album "JKT48 Festival Greatest Hits", JKT48 Official Fan Club privilege, and ballots distributed after every theater show.
- 18 March 2017: First round results announcement
- 1 April 2017: Second round results announcement
- 3–7 April 2017: Period for obtaining serial numbers by downloading the said single in the official mobile content menu.
- 3–9 April 2017: Voting period for serial numbers obtained by downloading from the official mobile content menu.
- 21 April 2017, midnight: Voting period closed at all
- 22 April 2017: Final results announcement

=== Categorization ===
The top 16 would sing the main single, while members ranked 17th to 32nd, called Under Girls, would sing the B-side.

=== Candidates ===
Sixty-four out of 66 individual JKT48 members active as of 8 March 2017 participated. The two remaining, Jessica Vania and Jessica Veranda, had announced their graduation earlier that year and thus did not participate in the election. Melody Nurramdhani Laksani was stated twice in the source (counted once here) due to her dual-membership back then.

=== Election results ===
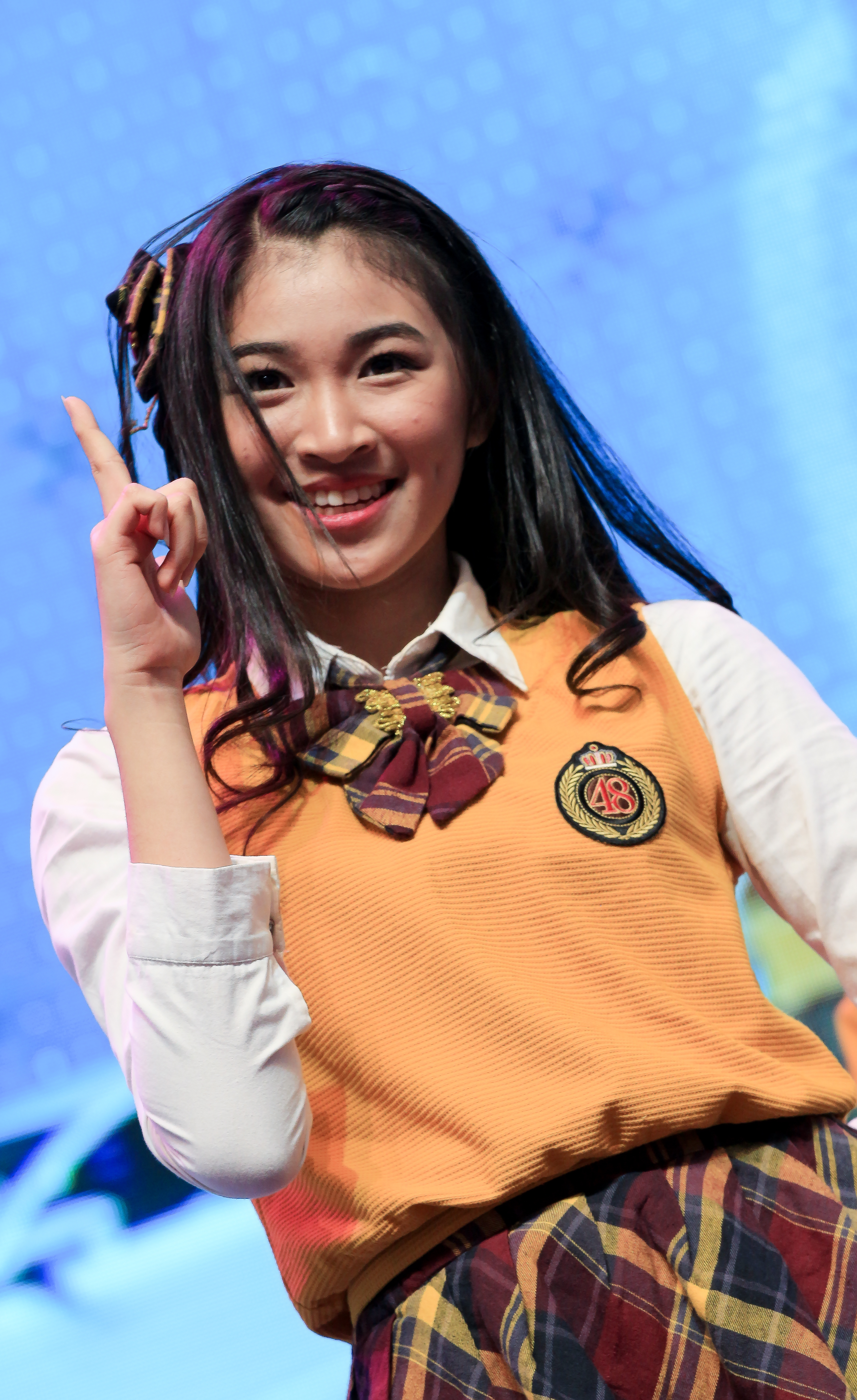
Shani Indira Natio, the election winner

Final rank	Name	Team	Popular vote	Progress from 2016 or last elected	Second preliminary result		First preliminary result	
Final rank	Name	Team	Popular vote	Progress from 2016 or last elected	Popular vote	Rank	Popular vote	Rank
1	Shani Indira Natio	KIII	47,717	▲25	13,582	1	5,856	2
2	Ayana Shahab	KIII	44,034	▲17	7,980	3	6,068	1
3	Melody Nurramdhani Laksani	J, T	41,684	▲2	4,061	12	2,613	5
4	Shania Gracia	KIII	40,685	▲7	9,012	2	3,146	4
5	Cindy Yuvia	KIII	37,477	▼1	4,163	11	2,172	10
6	Rina Chikano	KIII	34,976	▲3	4,357	8	484	29
7	Made Devi Ranita Ningtara	T	33,618	New entry	4,946	6	1,568	20
8	Shania Junianatha	J	31,765	▼2	2,451	18	1,943	13
9	Saktia Oktapyani	J	27,092	▲9	7,111	4	2,052	11
10	Aninditha Rahma Cahyadi	KIII	22,637	New entry	6,133	5	2,413	7
11	Rona Anggreani	KIII	22,611	▲ ≥22 ▲10 (2015)	3,183	15	2,282	8
12	Frieska Anastasia Laksani	KIII	21,264	▲ ≥21 ▲7 (2015)	2,419	19	N/A	N/A
13	Michelle Christo Kusnadi	J	19,315	▼1	2,721	17	1,824	16
14	Beby Chaesara Anadila	KIII	17,004	▲8	4,656	7	2,450	6
15	Devi Kinal Putri	J	15,803	▼5	1,097	31	574	28
16	Nabilah Ratna Ayu Azalia	J	15,134	▼8	1,333	29	395	30
17	Ayu Safira Oktaviani	KIII	14,661	New entry	4,241	10	1,875	15
18	Tan Zhi Hui Celine	T	14,389	New entry	4,328	9	3,313	3
19	Violeta Burhan	T	13,619	New entry	1,384	27	838	27
20	Cindy Hapsari; Maharani Pujiantoro Putri	T	12,038	New entry	3,034	16	941	25
21	Maria Genoveva Natalia; Desy Purnamasari Gunawan	KIII	11,725	▲ ≥12 ▲8 (2015)	3,483	14	1,909	14
22	Ratu Vienny Fitrilya	KIII	11,094	▲7	2,277	20	1,538	21
23	Adhisty Zara	T	9,173	New entry	1,825	23	1,480	22
24	Viviyona Apriani	J	8,468	▲6	3,609	13	2,231	9
25	Melati Putri Rahel Sesilia	T	7,470	New entry	1,159	30	1,122	24
26	Nurhayati	T	7,379	New entry	2,036	22	1,989	12
27	Della Delila	J	6,801	▲1	978	32	927	26
28	Fakhriyani Shafariyanti	KIII	6,584	New entry	2,232	21	1,749	17
29	Alicia Chanzia	KIII	6,345	New entry	N/A	N/A	N/A	N/A
30	Lidya Maulida Djuhandar	KIII	6,188	▲ ≥3 ▲1 (2015)	N/A	N/A	N/A	N/A
31	Dena Siti Rohyati	J	6,065	▼17	1,381	28	1,360	23
32	Syahfira Angela Nurhaliza	J	5,690	New entry	1,582	26	N/A	N/A
nr	Fransisca Saraswati Puspa Dewi	KIII	N/A	Steady	1,728	24	1,673	19
nr	Dwi Putri Bonita	J	N/A	▼ ≥18	1,725	25	1,717	18
nr	Sinka Juliani	J	N/A	▼ ≥16	N/A	N/A	301	31
nr	Christi	T	N/A	Steady	N/A	N/A	273	32

=== Post-election ===
- Shani Indira Natio became the first non-Team J member and the maiden non-first generation member to be elected as center. She also became the first third generation member to center any JKT48 single. Hopping 25 ranks from the 2016 election, she also broke the record of best progress for any members elected consecutively to the top 32, as well as best progress for election winners.
- For the first time there was no Team J member in the top two.
- The elected centers for both Senbatsu and Under Girls were from the same generation for the first time (3rd generation).
- Twelve out of the top 32 members were new entries; the then-most in any JKT48 election when the preceding edition was also using the 32-rank system. Ten went to Under Girls, two went to the Senbatsu, the record low for the latter in such election.
- Five members made their first top 16 finish: Made Devi Ranita Ningtara, Saktia Oktapyani, Aninditha Rahma Cahyadi, Rona Anggreani, and Frieska Anastasia Laksani. Made Devi and Aninditha made the top 32 for the first time. Only Made Devi and Rona who were not making their Senbatsu debut.
- Members with all-time high rank after this election (ever ranked at least twice) were Shani Indira Natio, Ayana Shahab, Shania Gracia, Rina Chikano, Saktia Oktapyani, Rona Anggreani, Frieska Anastasia Laksani, Maria Genoveva Natalia Desy Purnamasari Gunawan, Della Delila, and Lidya Maulida Djuhandar.
- Members with all-time low rank after this election (ever ranked at least twice) were Dena Siti Rohyati, Nabilah Ratna Ayu Azalia, Devi Kinal Putri, and Shania Junianatha.

== 2018 ==
JKT48 20th Single's Members Election
- Date: 8 September – 14 November 2018 (voting period); 17 November 2018 (final results announcement)
- Presenters: Jeremy Teti; Hana Qosim
- Venue: Sleman City Hall, Sleman, Yogyakarta Special Region
- Broadcaster: Upme (streaming)
- Entrants: 55 members (initial); 54 members (later); 66 members (final)
- Winner: Cindy Yuvia (Team J)
- Slogan: Re:Boost

JKT48 20th Single's Members Election (Indonesian: Pemilihan Member Single ke-20 JKT48) was a chain of event to determine the selected members who would participate in the 20th single of idol group JKT48. This event was the fifth edition, having been held annually since 2014. The election determined the top 32 members with the most votes to fill 32 positions on two songs; the top 16 (Japanese: senbatsu (選抜)) would be featured in the main single and the rest on the coupling song. The order of blocking (dancing position) was determined by the result of the vote from the fans. In this case, the number one position would place the member as the center on the single. The election result was revealed at Sleman City Hall in Sleman, Yogyakarta Special Region on 17 November 2018; for the first time the final result announcement was not held in Jakarta. It was emceed by former news anchor-turned-host Jeremy Teti and Hana Qosim.

The top 16 members sang in JKT48's 20th single, "High Tension" and the members ranked 17th to 32nd sang the B-side "Musim yang Selanjutnya"; the recording was released in January and February 2019.

=== Timeline ===
- 8 September 2018: Voting period opened for serial numbers obtained from JKT48 double single "UZA / Everyday, Kachuusha", JKT48 Circus music cards, JKT48 Official Fan Club privilege, and ballots distributed after every theater show.
- 29 September 2018: First round results announcement
- 30 September 2018: Release of Saka Agari music card, accompanied with serial numbers.
- 26 October 2018: Second round results announcement
- 5–9 November 2018: Period for obtaining serial numbers by downloading a song in the official mobile content menu.
- 15 November 2018, midnight: Voting period closed at all
- 17 November 2018: Final results announcement

=== Categorization ===
The top 16 would sing the main single, while members ranked 17th to 32nd, called Under Girls, would sing the B-side.

=== Candidates ===
Fifty-five out of 60 JKT48 members active as of 8 September 2018 participated. The other five had announced their graduation earlier that year and thus did not participate in the election. Two of them would eventually leave the group amid the election process. This was the first JKT48 election to not feature a Japanese national.

On 1 November 2018, Putri Cahyaning Anggraini became the first member to ever drop her candidacy. She was dismissed by the management.

On 2 November 2018, twelve seventh-generation members who had been promoted to the Class A of the Academy entered the election. When the voting period was over, there were 66 out of 76 members still in the race. The additional 7 members not participating were the remaining seventh generation members, who were still in the Class B of the Academy.

=== Election results ===
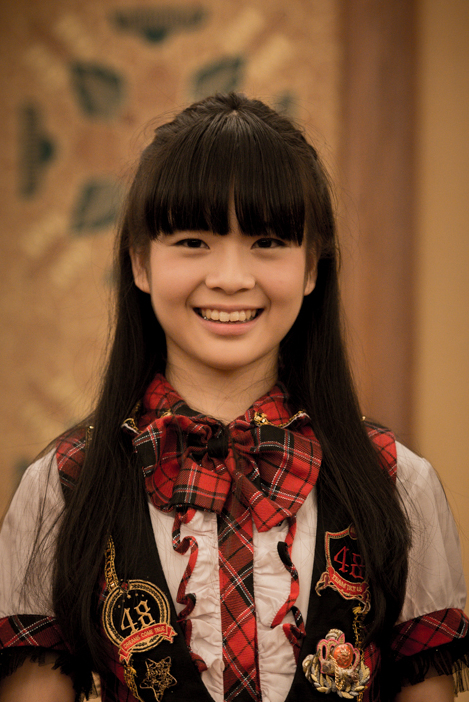
Cindy Yuvia, the election winner

Final rank	Name	Team	Popular vote	Progress from 2017 or last elected	Second preliminary result		First preliminary result	
Final rank	Name	Team	Popular vote	Progress from 2017 or last elected	Popular vote	Rank	Popular vote	Rank
1	Cindy Yuvia	J	68,031	▲4	27,350	1	14,101	1
2	Shani Indira Natio	KIII	47,654	▼1	27,349	2	3,562	11
3	Sinka Juliani	J	39,652	▲ ≥30 ▲14 (2016)	18,483	3	9,102	3
4	Feni Fitriyanti	J	37,220	New entry	11,804	7	6,406	5
5	Nurhayati	J	27,259	▲21	13,643	5	6,238	6
6	Ayu Safira Oktaviani	T	26,487	▲11	9,146	11	1,327	22
7	Stephanie Pricilla Indarto Putri	J	26,283	New entry	9,576	10	5,196	7
8	Shania Gracia	KIII	24,670	▼4	17,415	4	2,234	16
9	Ratu Vienny Fitrilya	KIII	22,554	▲13	4,492	20	2,002	17
10	Ayana Shahab	T	22,291	▼8	7,220	13	1,690	19
11	Beby Chaesara Anadila	KIII	22,065	▲3	10,800	8	5,163	8
12	Viviyona Apriani	KIII	19,237	▲12	8,201	12	7,207	4
13	Aninditha Rahma Cahyadi	KIII	17,824	▼3	10,318	9	2,897	13
14	Jinan Safa Safira	T	17,511	New entry	12,694	6	10,133	2
15	Michelle Christo Kusnadi	J	14,116	▼2	5,188	18	1,211	25
16	Gabryela Marcelina	Academy A	13,587	New entry	2,258	27	N/A	N/A
17	Thalia Ivanka Elizabeth	T	10,510	▲ ≥16 ▼1 (2016)	5,559	15	3,205	12
18	Maria Genoveva Natalia; Desy Purnamasari Gunawan	KIII	10,276	▲3	5,431	16	2,445	14
19	Eve Antoinette Ichwan	Academy A	9,901	New entry	3,075	23	2,365	15
20	Melati Putri Rahel Sesilia	T	9,839	▲5	6,498	14	N/A	N/A
21	Rona Anggreani	KIII	8,747	▼10	5,391	17	3,657	10
22	Tan Zhi Hui Celine	T	8,076	▼4	2,388	26	1,373	21
23	Nadila Cindi Wantari	KIII	7,848	▲ ≥10 ▼3 (2016)	2,939	24	575	29
24	Fidly Immanda Azzahra	T	7,528	New entry	4,259	21	1,741	18
25	Shania Junianatha	J	7,481	▼17	5,126	19	4,064	9
26	Sonia Natalia	T	6,193	New entry	3,930	22	1,314	23
27	Cindy Hapsari; Maharani Pujiantoro Putri	J	5,239	▼7	1,753	30	813	27
28	Natalia	KIII	4,474	▲ ≥5 ▼4 (2016)	1,750	31	757	28
29	Gabriela Margareth Warouw	J	4,295	▲ ≥4 ▼16 (2016)	2,699	25	1,254	24
30	Fransisca Saraswati Puspa Dewi	KIII	3,977	New entry	2,101	28	1,187	26
31	Frieska Anastasia Laksani	J	3,350	▼19	2,018	29	1,603	20
32	Adhisty Zara	T	1,867	▼9	1,264	32	481	30
nr	Erika Ebisawa Kuswan	KIII	N/A	Steady	N/A	N/A	451	31
nr	Hasyakyla Utami Kusumawardhani	T	N/A	Steady	N/A	N/A	347	32

=== Post-election ===
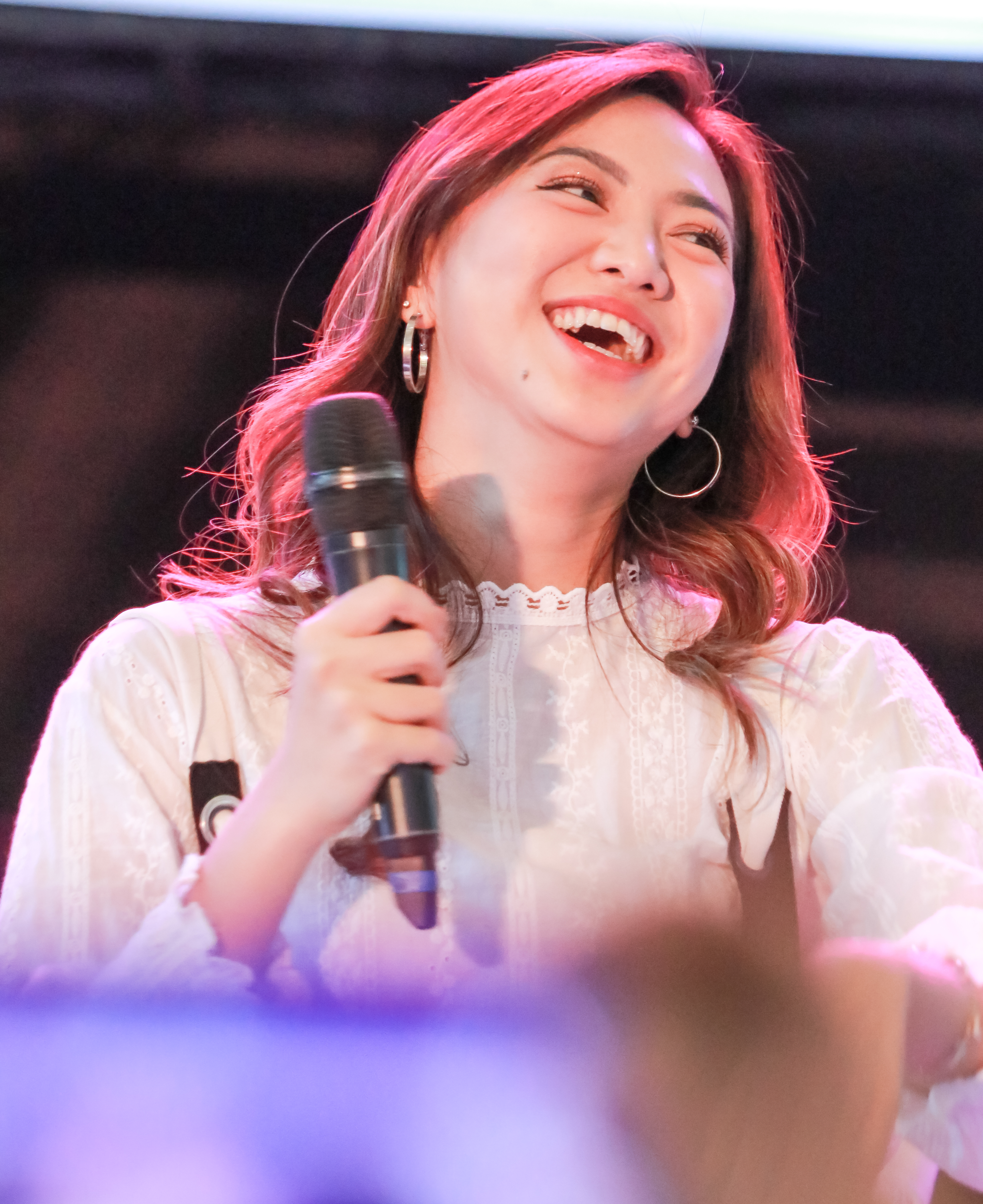
Shania Junianatha

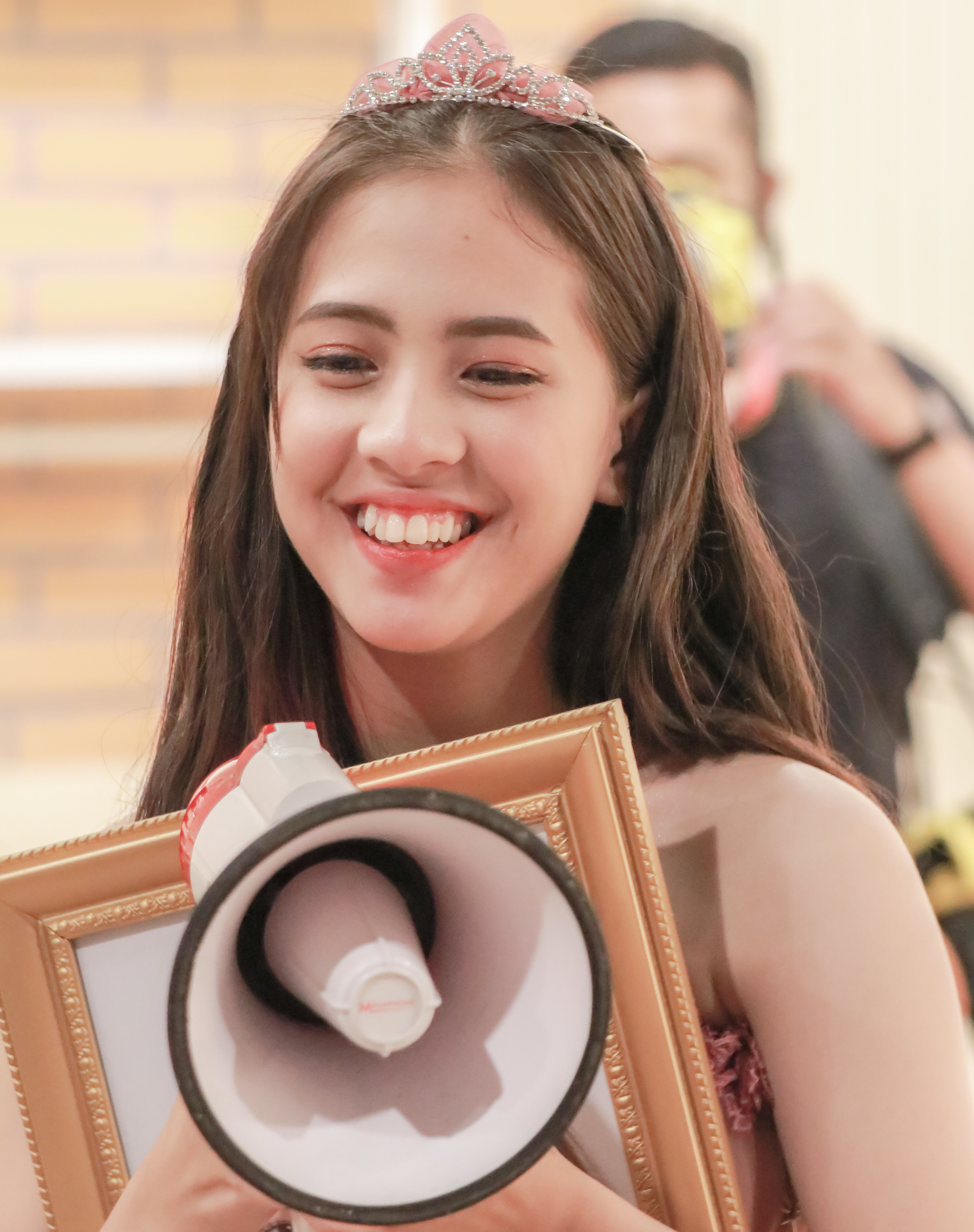
Adhisty Zara

- Cindy Yuvia became the fourth distinctive election winner. She also became the then-most voted member in a single election and created the then-highest winning margin (20,377 votes). She also became the first and eventually the only second generation member to win a JKT48 election, as well as the only member to consistently finish in the top 16 in each of the first five elections.
- Third-placed Sinka Juliani broke the record of best progress for any members who were not in the top 32 in the previous election.
- Fourth-place finisher Feni Fitriyanti equaled the record for highest finish by a new entry. The record was set by Andela Yuwono in 2015. However, Feni finished as high in her fifth attempt; Andela was only in her second participation and only full cycle election.
- For the first time there were Academy members (formerly called Trainees) elected to the top 32. Gabryela Marcelina became only the second Academy member to be a Senbatsu and the first since Adriani Elisabeth in "Love Trip" (2016).
- The elected centers for both Senbatsu and Under Girls were from the same generation for the second consecutive time (2nd generation), and the first not to come from 3rd generation.
- Adhisty Zara set the record as the least-voted top 32 member by getting 1,867 votes. The previous record-holder was Shani Indira Natio who also finished 32nd but earned 3,710 votes (2015), nearly twice as much.
- Eight out of the top 32 members were new entries; the least in any JKT48 election. This was split evenly between Under Girls and the Senbatsu, the record low for the former in such election.
- Seven members made their first top 16 finish: Sinka Juliani, Feni Fitriyanti, Nurhayati, Ayu Safira Oktaviani, Stephanie Pricilla Indarto Putri, Jinan Safa Safira, and Gabryela Marcelina. Feni, Stephanie, Jinan, and Gabryela made their first top 32 finish. Only Ayu and Gabryela who were making their Senbatsu debut.
- Group captain Shania Junianatha reached her new all-time low election result, which was – as of the 2024 election – the only time a sitting group captain failed to finish higher than ninth place. During her acceptance speech, she announced her graduation.
- Other members with all-time low rank after this election (ever ranked at least twice) were Adhisty Zara, Gabriela Margareth Warouw, Frieska Anastasia Laksani, Natalia, Cindy Hapsari Maharani Pujiantoro Putri, Nadila Cindi Wantari, Tan Zhi Hui Celine, Thalia Ivanka Elizabeth, and Aninditha Rahma Cahyadi.
- Members with all-time high rank after this election (ever ranked at least twice) were Cindy Yuvia, Sinka Juliani, Nurhayati, Ayu Safira Oktaviani, Maria Genoveva Natalia Desy Purnamasari Gunawan, and Melati Putri Rahel Sesilia.

== 2019 ==
JKT48 Original Single's Members Election
- Date: 14 September – 28 November 2019 (voting period); 30 November 2019 (final results announcement)
- Presenters: Dwi Andhika; Yesica Amami
- Venue: BRP SMESCO Convention Hall, South Jakarta, Jakarta Capital Special Region
- Broadcaster: RCTI+ (streaming)
- Entrants: 66 members
- Winner: Shani Indira Natio (Team KIII)

JKT48 Original Single's Members Election (Indonesian: Pemilihan Member Single Original JKT48) was a chain of event to determine the selected members who would participate in the 21st single; the first original (Indonesian-made rather than translated from Japanese) single of idol group JKT48. This event was the sixth edition, having been held annually since 2014. The election determined the top 32 members with the most votes to fill 32 positions on two songs; the top 16 (Japanese: senbatsu (選抜)) would be featured in the main single and the rest on the coupling song. The order of blocking (dancing position) was determined by the result of the vote from the fans. In this case, the number one position would place the member as the center on the single. The election result was revealed at BRP SMESCO Convention Hall in South Jakarta. It was emceed by actor and famous host from teen shows Planet Remaja antv, Dwi Andhika and Yesica Amami.

The top 16 members sang in JKT48's 21st single and first original single, "Rapsodi" (Rhapsody) and the members ranked 17th to 32nd sang the B-side "Sweet & Bitter"; the CD and DVD set was released on 29 February 2020 following the music card release on 22 January 2020.

=== Timeline ===
- 14 September 2019: Voting period opened for serial numbers obtained from records (CD+DVDs and music cards)
- 5 October 2019: First round results announcement
- 9 October 2019: Release of JOY KICK! TEARS music card, accompanied with serial numbers.
- 3 November 2019: Second round results announcement
- 20–25 November 2019: Period for obtaining serial numbers by downloading the song "Otona Ressha" in the official mobile content menu.
- 28 November 2019, midnight: Voting period closed at all, it was later postponed for 12 hours due to technical issues.
- 30 November 2019: Final results announcement

=== Categorization ===
The top 16 sang the original, main single titled "Rapsodi" (Rhapsody). The members ranked 17th to 32nd, called Under Girls, sang the B-side, "Sweet & Bitter".

=== Candidates ===
Sixty-six out of 78 individual JKT48 members active as of 14 September 2019 participated. Twelve members had announced their graduation earlier that year and thus did not participate in the election. Three of them would eventually leave the group amid the election process. Aninditha Rahma Cahyadi was stated twice in the source (counted once here) due to her dual-membership back then.

=== Election results ===
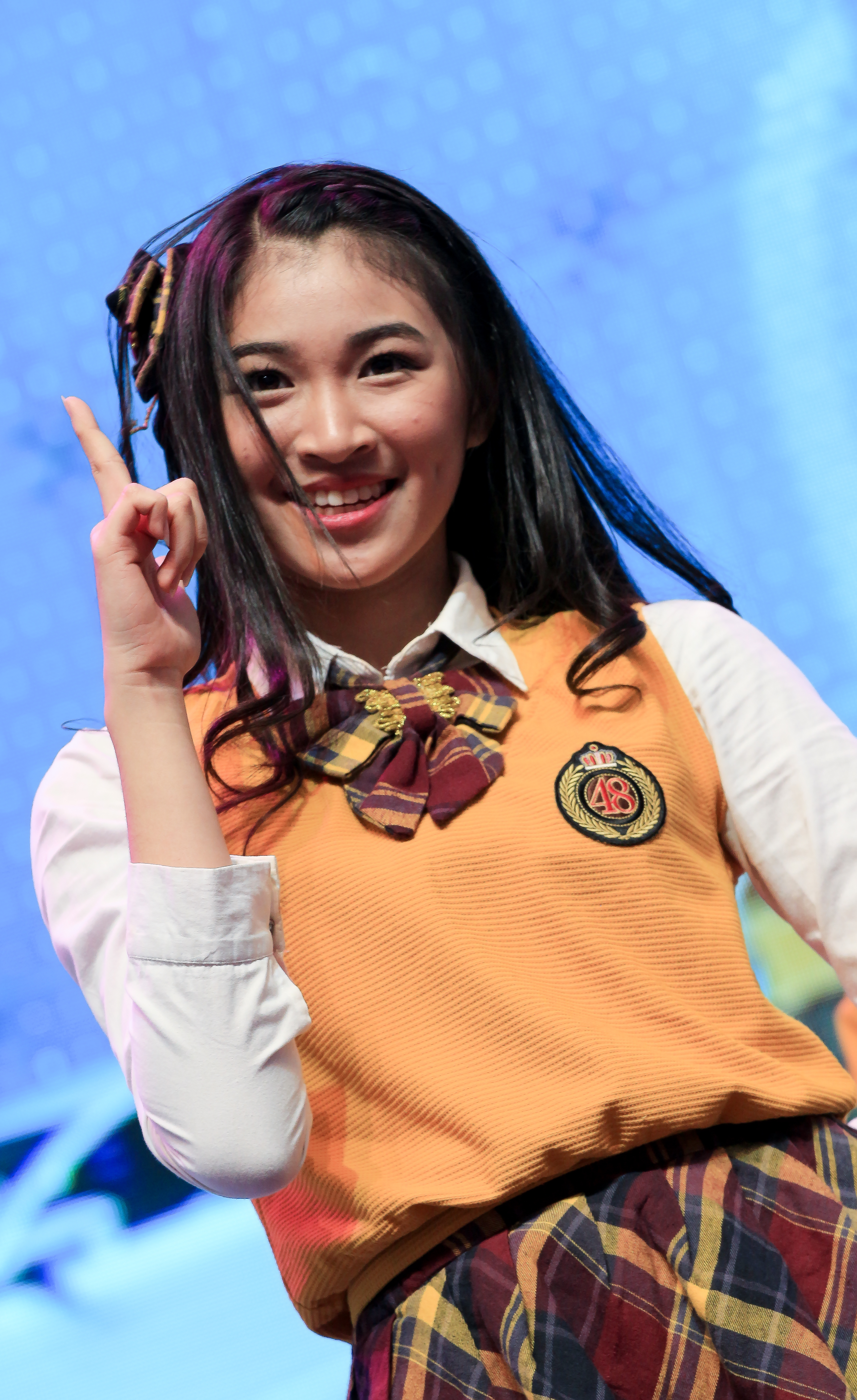
Shani Indira Natio, the election winner

Final rank	Name	Team	Popular vote	Progress from 2018 or last elected	Second preliminary result		First preliminary result	
Final rank	Name	Team	Popular vote	Progress from 2018 or last elected	Popular vote	Rank	Popular vote	Rank
1	Shani Indira Natio	KIII	72,707	▲1	39,680	1	15,194	1
2	Feni Fitriyanti	J	44,434	▲2	14,811	3	6,375	3
3	Riska Amelia Putri	J	31,367	New entry	12,035	7	5,059	6
4	Nurhayati	KIII	28,440	▲1	15,278	2	4,667	7
5	Nadila Cindi Wantari	J	24,798	▲18	9,836	9	2,676	12
6	Gabryela Marcelina	T	23,404	▲10	12,739	5	5,138	5
7	Cindy Hapsari; Maharani Pujiantoro Putri	J	22,525	▲20	12,040	6	2,379	15
8	Beby Chaesara Anadila	KIII	21,792	▲3	13,421	4	3,648	9
9	Tan Zhi Hui Celine	T	21,350	▲13	9,299	10	4,509	8
10	Shania Gracia	KIII	20,601	▼2	5,153	16	1,025	29
11	Melati Putri Rahel Sesilia	T	19,342	▲9	2,207	31	1,031	28
12	Jinan Safa Safira	T	18,064	▲2	10,494	8	7,010	2
13	Angelina Christy	KIII	17,477	New entry	3,873	22	1,545	22
14	Diani Amalia Ramadhani	J	15,951	New entry	8,375	11	5,457	4
15	Helisma Putri	KIII	15,842	New entry	6,556	13	N/A	N/A
16	Viona Fadrin	Academy A	14,566	New entry	3,926	21	2,323	16
17	Maria Genoveva Natalia; Desy Purnamasari Gunawan	KIII	13,390	▲1	5,848	14	2,692	11
18	Rona Anggreani	J	13,039	▲3	6,600	12	2,585	13
19	Sania Julia Montolalu	J	11,330	New entry	5,458	15	2,061	17
20	Frieska Anastasia Laksani	J	10,410	▲11	3,852	23	1,272	26
21	Aninditha Rahma Cahyadi	KIII, T	9,661	▼8	4,835	17	1,523	23
22	Gabriela Margareth Warouw	J	7,758	▲7	2,901	28	1,549	21
23	Puti Nadhira Azalia	T	7,724	New entry	3,960	20	2,516	14
24	Ni Made Ayu Vania Aurellia	J	7,641	▲ ≥9 ▲3 (2016)	3,510	25	1,811	19
25	Nabila Fitriana	T	7,505	New entry	4,796	18	1,890	18
26	Dhea Angelia	Academy A	7,334	New entry	2,137	32	1,049	27
27	Febi Komaril	Academy A	6,552	New entry	3,462	27	1,347	25
28	Fidly Immanda Azzahra	T	6,279	▼4	4,011	19	2,706	10
29	Ariella Calista Ichwan	J	5,966	New entry	2,702	29	1,374	24
30	Yessica Tamara	KIII	5,888	New entry	3,464	26	N/A	N/A
31	Aurel Mayori Putri	J	5,701	New entry	3,769	24	1,606	20
32	Rinanda Syahputri	T	5,681	New entry	2,437	30	849	30
nr	Azizi Asadel	J	N/A	Steady	N/A	N/A	791	31
nr	Jessica Chandra	Academy A	N/A	Steady	N/A	N/A	742	32

=== Post-election ===
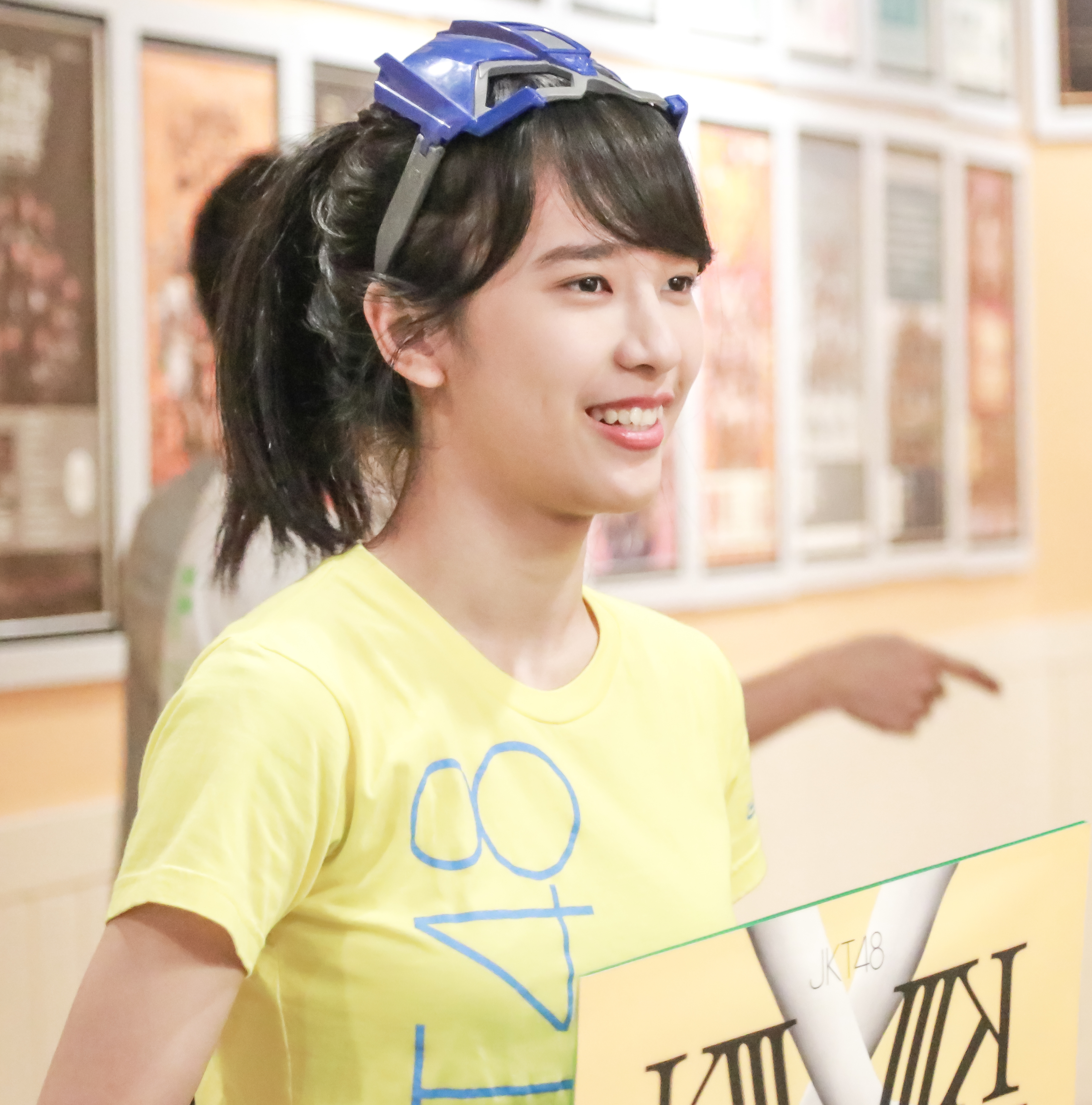
Beby Chaesara Anadila

- Shani Indira Natio became the new most-voted member in a single election and broke the record for highest winning margin (28,273 votes). She also became the first non-Team J member to be reelected as center, and also the first center to be reelected non-consecutively.
- By finishing third, Riska Amelia Putri broke the record for highest finish by a new entry. The previous record (fourth) was set by Andela Yuwono in 2015 and was equaled by Feni Fitriyanti in 2018. However, Feni finished as high in her fifth attempt; Andela and Riska were only in their second participation and the former was in her only full cycle election.
- Finishing eighth, Beby Chaesara Anadila became the first and only member to be ranked in the first six JKT48 elections. She was already the only ranked member in the first election (2014) to participate this year.
- The elected centers for both Senbatsu and Under Girls were from the same generation for the third consecutive time (3rd generation), and the first time that the same generation won both centers more than once (previously in 2017).
- Fourteen out of the top 32 members were new entries; the most in any JKT48 election when the preceding edition was also using the 32-rank system. Nine went to Under Girls, five went to the Senbatsu, the joint-record high for the latter in such election.
- Seven members made their Senbatsu debut by finishing in the top 16, which also their first top 16 finish: Riska Amelia Putri, Nadila Cindi Wantari, Tan Zhi Hui Celine, Angelina Christy, Diani Amalia Ramadhani, Helisma Putri, and Viona Fadrin. Remarkably, this was only the second election participation for Riska, Christy, Helisma, and Viona. These four members, along with Diani, made their first ever top 32 finish as well. Malaysian national Tan Zhi Hui Celine's finish (ninth) marked Rapsodi as the first JKT48 single to feature a member who is neither Japanese nor Indonesian.
- For the second consecutive time there were Academy members (formerly called Trainees) elected to the top 32. With three, this was the most of all time; having had only two in 2018 and none before. Earning 14,566 votes, Viona Fadrin became the most-voted Academy member, surpassing Gabryela Marcelina (13,587), who also finished 16th in 2018.
- Members with all-time high rank after this election (ever ranked at least twice) were Feni Fitriyanti, Nurhayati, Nadila Cindi Wantari, Gabryela Marcelina, Cindy Hapsari Maharani Pujiantoro Putri, Tan Zhi Hui Celine, Melati Putri Rahel Sesilia, Jinan Safa Safira, Maria Genoveva Natalia Desy Purnamasari Gunawan, and Ni Made Ayu Vania Aurellia.
- Members with all-time low rank after this election (ever ranked at least twice) were Fidly Immanda Azzahra and Aninditha Rahma Cahyadi.

== 2024 ==
JKT48 26th Single's Members Election
- Date: 1 September – 9 December 2024 (voting period); 15 December 2024 (final results announcement)
- Presenters: Dwi Andhika; Shani Indira Natio; Melody Nurramdhani Laksani
- Venue: Indonesia Arena, Central Jakarta, Jakarta
- Broadcaster: JKT48 via YouTube
- Sponsor: Erigo; Chatime
- Entrants: 51 members
- Winner: Feni Fitriyanti
- Slogan: The Chance is Now

JKT48 26th Single's Members Election (Indonesian: Pemilihan Member Single ke-26 JKT48) was a chain of event to determine the selected members who would participate in the 26th single of idol group JKT48. This event was the seventh edition and the first time since 2019, having been previously held annually since 2014. Due to the long pause, this election was the first (discounting the first ever edition) not to be contested any previous winner, as all of them had graduated from the group. The election determined the top 24 members with the most votes to fill 24 positions on two songs; the top 12 (Japanese: senbatsu (選抜)) would be featured in the main single and the rest on the coupling song. The order of blocking (dancing position) was determined by the result of the vote from the fans. In this case, the number one position would place the member as the center on the single. The election results was announced at the Indonesia Arena, Central Jakarta, Jakarta on 15 December 2024 and was broadcast live on the group's official YouTube channel.

=== Timeline ===
- 1 September 2024, 18:00 UTC+7: Voting period opened
- 28 September 2024: First round results announcement
- 31 October 2024: Second round results announcement
- 30 November 2024: Sales of voting codes period closed
- 9 December 2024, 12:00 UTC+7: Voting period closed
- 15 December 2024: Final results announcement

=== Categorization ===
The top 12 members would sing the title song of JKT48's 26th single, "#Sukinanda" and the members ranked 13th to 24th would sing a coupling song or B-side based on the blocking order determined by fan votes; it was released on digital music platforms in February 2025.

=== Candidates ===
Featuring 51 of the 52 active members of the group as of 1 September 2024, this election had the least number of participants—bar the first edition's initial 40 members, which then ballooned to 71 by the end of the cycle. Among the 71, only two of them—the later added third generation members—that were still taking part ten years on, which meant no active member had fully taken part in all elections for the first time ever.

=== Election results ===
Final rank	Name	Status	Popular vote	Progress from 2019	Second preliminary result		First preliminary result	
Final rank	Name	Status	Popular vote	Progress from 2019	Popular vote	Rank	Popular vote	Rank
1	Feni Fitriyanti	Member	219,616	▲1	77,770	1	31,520	1
2	Angelina Christy	Member	141,111	▲11	62,487	2	24,020	2
3	Jessica Chandra	Member	123,033	New entry	39,643	5	13,924	6
4	Fiony Alveria	Member	103,818	New entry	50,830	3	10,362	9
5	Mutiara Azzahra	Member	103,670	New entry	31,241	8	23,696	3
6	Freya Jayawardana	Member	77,328	New entry	40,026	4	17,867	5
7	Gita Sekar Andarini	Member	65,313	New entry	32,559	7	18,307	4
8	Shania Gracia	Member	63,277	▲2	34,101	6	12,910	8
9	Marsha Lenathea	Member	52,551	New entry	26,135	9	13,326	7
10	Aurellia	Member	47,904	New entry	20,616	15	7,151	13
11	Lulu Salsabila	Member	47,502	New entry	24,271	10	N/A	N/A
12	Cornelia Vanisa	Member	46,314	New entry	20,902	14	8,270	12
13	Indah Cahya	Member	45,716	New entry	21,538	11	8,586	11
14	Febriola Sinambela	Member	45,028	New entry	15,017	22	6,282	19
15	Aurhel Alana	Trainee	42,213	New entry	21,314	13	5,549	21
16	Indira Seruni	Member	39,086	New entry	14,027	24	5,373	22
17	Grace Octaviani	Member	38,029	New entry	17,777	17	9,564	10
18	Catherina Vallencia	Trainee	37,957	New entry	16,830	18	5,592	20
19	Kathrina Irene	Member	34,359	New entry	18,025	16	6,551	17
20	Cathleen Nixie	Member	34,080	New entry	21,440	12	4,969	24
21	Greesella Adhalia	Member	33,241	New entry	14,256	23	6,984	15
22	Helisma Putri	Member	28,925	▼7	15,925	20	6,790	16
23	Gabriela Abigail	Member	28,172	New entry	15,797	21	6,490	18
24	Adeline Wijaya	Trainee	26,947	New entry	N/A	N/A	N/A	N/A
nr	Flora Shafiq	Member	N/A	Steady	16,378	19	7,141	14
nr	Celline Thefani	Member	N/A	Steady	N/A	N/A	5,195	23

=== Post-election ===
- Feni Fitriyanti became the new most-voted member in a single election, tripling the previous record (Shani Indira Natio, 72,707 votes, 2019), thus top it by a staggering 146,909 votes. She also broke the record for the highest winning margin (78,505 votes). In fact, the former record was broken six times, as all members who finished from sixth to first (in order: Freya Jayawardana, Mutiara Azzahra, Fiony Alveria, Jessica Chandra, Angelina Christy, and Feni) earned more than 72,707 votes.
- By finishing third, Jessica Chandra equaled the record for highest finish by a new entry. The record was previously set by Riska Amelia Putri in 2019.
- Finishing eighth, Shania Gracia equaled the record for most finishes in the senbatsu zone (five).
- Twenty out of the top 24 members were new entries; the most in any JKT48 election and the highest by percentage (83.33%) for an election held after 2014. Eleven went to Under Girls, nine went to the Senbatsu, the record high for the latter in such election.
- Only one made their Senbatsu debut by finishing in the top 12 (Aurellia). She became the first tenth generation member to feature in the group's main single.
- Ninth generation member Indah Cahya became the first member recruited after 2014 (fourth generation and after) to finish a members election as either a senbatsu or Under Girls center.
- For the third consecutive time there were Trainee or Academy members to be ranked. With three, this was the joint-most of all time; having had only two in 2018 and none before. Ranked 15th and earning 42,213 votes, Aurhel Alana became both the most-voted and the highest-ranked Trainee or Academy member, surpassing Viona Fadrin, who finished 16th in 2019 with 14,566 votes. However, Viona's 16th-placed finish was enough to place her as a senbatsu, while Aurhel's 15th was not. The most-voted record itself was already broken twice before, with both Adeline Wijaya and Catherina Vallencia earning more than 26,000 votes each.
- Adeline Wijaya became the first candidate to be ranked having been unnamed in the first two preliminary results since 2017.
- Members with all-time high rank after this election (ever ranked at least twice) were Feni Fitriyanti and Angelina Christy.
- Member with all-time low rank after this election (ever ranked at least twice) was Helisma Putri.

== Statistics ==
Accurate for elections from 2014 to 2024.

Elections won per person
Rank	Name	Wins
1	Jessica Veranda	2
1	Shani Indira Natio	2
3	Cindy Yuvia	1
3	Feni Fitriyanti	1
3	Melody Nurramdhani Laksani	1

Elections won per team (2014–2019 only)
Rank	Team	Members	Wins
1	Team J	3	4
2	Team KIII	1	2

Elections won per generation
Rank	Generation	Members	Wins
1	1st	2	3
1	3rd	2	3
3	2nd	1	1

Under Girls center won per person
Rank	Name	Wins
1	Ayu Safira Oktaviani	1
1	Elaine Hartanto	1
1	Indah Cahya	1
1	Maria Genoveva Natalia Desy; Purnamasari Gunawan	1
1	Sinka Juliani	1
1	Thalia Ivanka Elizabeth	1

Under Girls center won per team (2014–2019 only)
Rank	Team	Members	Wins
1	Team KIII	3	3
2	Team T	2	2

Under Girls center won per generation
Rank	Generation	Members	Wins
1	3rd	3	3
2	2nd	2	2
3	9th	1	1

Ranked finish per person
Rank	Name	Senbatsu finish	Under Girls finish	Total
1	Beby Chaesara Anadila	5	1	6
2	Cindy Yuvia	5	0	5
2	Shania Gracia	5	0	5
4	Ayana Shahab	4	1	5
4	Shania Junianatha	4	1	5
6	Ratu Vienny Fitrilya	3	2	5
6	Shani Indira Natio	3	2	5
8	Viviyona Apriani	2	3	5
9	Devi Kinal Putri	4	0	4
9	Melody Nurramdhani Laksani	4	0	4
9	Nabilah Ratna Ayu Azalia	4	0	4

Senbatsu finish per person
Rank	Name	Wins
1	Beby Chaesara Anadila	5
1	Cindy Yuvia	5
1	Shania Gracia	5
4	Ayana Shahab	4
4	Devi Kinal Putri	4
4	Melody Nurramdhani Laksani	4
4	Nabilah Ratna Ayu Azalia	4
4	Shania Junianatha	4
9	Feni Fitriyanti	3
9	Ghaida Farisya	3
9	Haruka Nakagawa	3
9	Jessica Veranda	3
9	Michelle Christo Kusnadi	3
9	Ratu Vienny Fitrilya	3
9	Shani Indira Natio	3

Under Girls finish per person
Rank	Name	Wins
1	Maria Genoveva Natalia Desy; Purnamasari Gunawan	4
2	Frieska Anastasia Laksani	3
2	Rona Anggreani	3
2	Viviyona Apriani	3

== See also ==
- JKT48 discography and filmography
- List of JKT48 members
