= Kosovan folk music =

Albanian Folk Music from Kosovo is rich with rare and unique elements. Kosovo's folklore claims roots in the 6th–5th centuries BC.

== Genesis ==
In the past, epic poetry in Kosovo and northern Albania was sung on a lahuta (a one-string fiddle) and then a more tuneful çiftelia was used which has two strings – one for the melody and one for drone. Kosovar music is influenced by Turkish music since the entire region spent 500 years as part of the Ottoman Empire but the Kosovar folklore preserved originality. Archaeological researches tells about how old this tradition is and how it was developed in a parallel way with other traditional music in Balkan. Many roots were found in the 5th century BC like paintings in stones showing singers with instruments (In the famous the portrait "Pani" was shown holding an instrument similar to a flute).

== Genres ==
=== Rapsodi ===
Rapsodi is a special traditional music genre. Rapsodi are poetry mainly about homeland, war and famous warriors. They are always accompanied with original Kosovar Albanian instruments such as Ciftelia or Sharkia. In a special way, they are patriotic songs which are dedicated to brave warriors, continuous wars against the Turks and Serbians. Rapsodi is also known for its charismatic interpretation, for the old traditional Kosovo away from every oriental element that represents, for the clear pronunciation of the word, for its distinctive vocals, gestures, and acting in singing as well. Their topics were very real because they always tell a homeland story by singing.
Here are some famous rapsodi verses:
E n’Prishtinë atje pikë s’ pari
Krisi topi o me duhi
Atje gjaku o i shqiptarit
Ra në tokë me bi përsëri...

=== Sofrat ===
Sofrat represents a group of male artists and singers who sing together siting around the table. Their songs are mostly folklore with different social topics which are followed by generations. These songs are accompanied with many instruments. The musicians are also part of sofra. Sofrat, organized into traditional orders represent a precious treasure of cultural heritage in Kosovo. Many traditional artists have become famous from their interpretations in Sofra. Depending from the rhythm, sofra songs can be accompanied with various traditional dances. Most popular sofras are Sofra Pejane, Sofra Gjakovare, etc. Nowadays, sofra continues to be very popular and present at almost every wedding. It happens to be organized also as a part of cultural program in some cities.

=== Wedding songs ===
These songs are characteristic for weddings. They are separated into two parts. The first part are songs for the bride before she gets married. They are usually accompanied with Def – a traditional instrument and are similar to poetry. Most of those songs are original creations that are a spontaneous dedication to the person getting married. The second part are songs for the couple. They are accompanied by many instruments and have interesting topics. Some of them express congratulations for the couple, characteristics of living together, etc. Wedding songs usually go together with specific traditional dance, therefore they are interesting and important because they also represent Kosovar Albanian tradition.
One of the most famous Wedding Song is:
Sonte kemi dasem
Hajde Marshalla'
Hidheni vallen goca
Hajde me sevda

=== Dirge (Kenge Vaji) ===
It is one of the most famous Albanian characteristics. They represent an original and very emotional creations which are dedicated to a close and beloved person after their death. It is specific because it is an art born from the suffering. This genre is almost the oldest. It has many variations and it is very popular because it has to do with a special condition that people confront in their daily life. Dirge can be created by from one or more persons. The most difficult and rarest variation is the polyphonic Dirge because it needs four participants to be in a harmony.

Vocal Characteristics of Polifonic Dirge

| Voices | Description | Role |
|---|---|---|
| First Voice | Sings | Thrill Voice |
| Second Voice | Sings | Thriller Voice |
| Third Voice | Sings | Speaker |
| Fourth Voice | Sings | Lament |

=== Lullabies ===
Lullabies are short poetic monologues, where the parents express their wishes about their children before sleep. The most usual artistic and literary techniques that are used are comparison and personification. They are also lyrical. Their characteristic is that most of them start with "Nani-nani djalin/vajzen" or "Nina-nana". Lullabies are the finest representation about expressing parental love and the irreplaceable role of family in Kosovo tradition.

Well-known kosovar lullaby is:
Nina-nina, more pllum
Flej se nana te don shum
T'i m'u rritsh-o nafaklum

== Traditional music instruments ==
=== Ciftelia ===
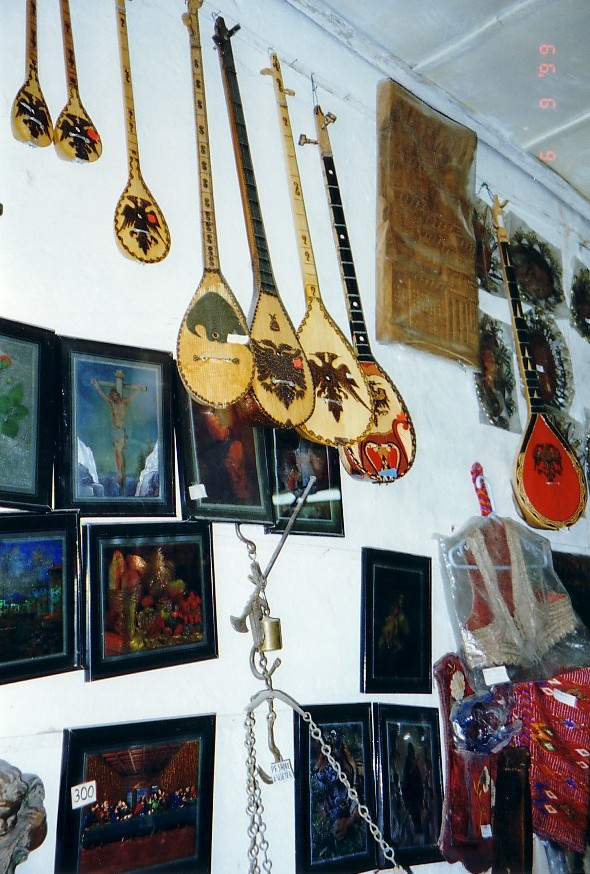
Disa Cifteli

Ciftelia is an original unique instrument in Kosovo. This is a two-stringed instrument in which one string is used for the drone and one for the melody. It is a wooden instrument with a small head and a long tail. It is used in a style of dance and pastoral songs, mostly on Kosovo and it is known as a Gheg Instrument. Together with Sharkia it represent a strongly traditional instrument and has characteristics of rapsodian genre.

=== Sharkia ===
Sharkia is a traditional instrument usually with five wires (2+1+2). There are also some other kinds of sharkia, one of them is with 12 wires. Sharkia's sounds are deep and vibrant. Often this instrument is accompanied with a good part of lyrical and epic songs, as well as various popular traditional dance. Sharkia is known as a complex instrument, is used alone or in orchestral formations as the main tool. The most characteristic thing about sharkia, is that its playing focuses primarily on the first wire, two others run iso. In entrances and ends of phrases the third wire is included, which gives basic tone. This creates a special effect, which is characteristic of this instrument.

=== Lahuta ===
Lahuta is a typical Kosovar Albanian instrument which is formed by an arc and chord consisting of horse hair since 1950. Lahuta's shape is semi-spherical and covered with tanned leather which grips the sides of its wooden pegs. Lahuta often is decorated with symbols of ancient cults such as the head of the goat, snake, or historical figures. Lahuta's sound is nasal and fits very well with the content of epic songs. From 2011 this old traditional instrument is protected by UNESCO. "Lahuta e xhubleta në UNESCO me kreshnikët", Gazeta Shqiptare, 29 March 2011, paragraph 1,4.

== Traditional music festivals ==
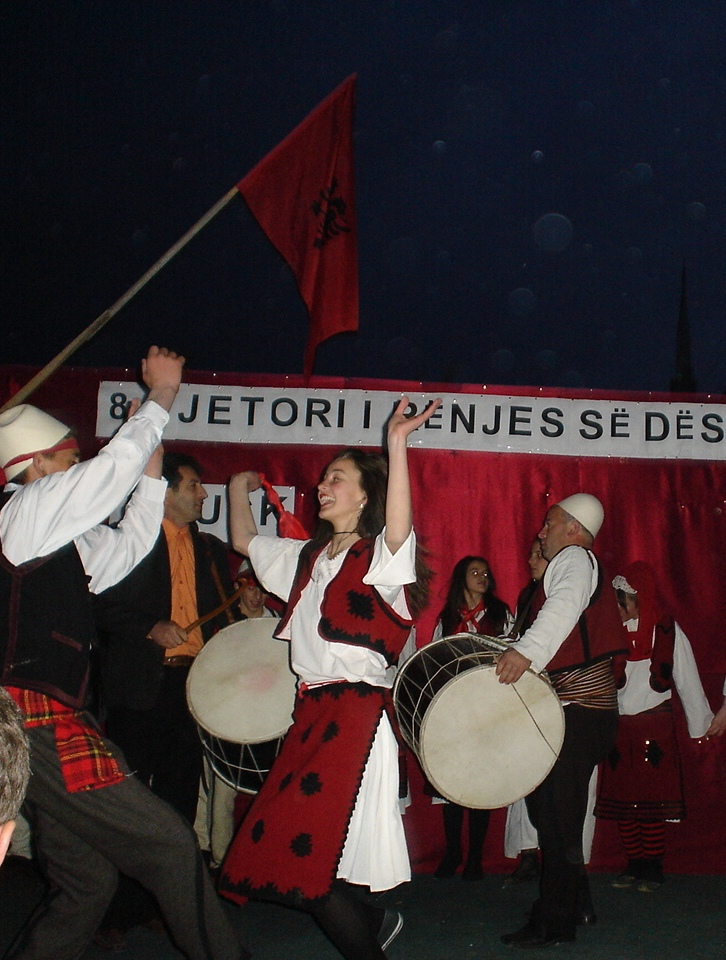
Kosovo Albanians dancing

There are many traditional music festivals in Kosovo that are held during one calendar year. Some of them are traditional and are held every year and others are held just once but have been successful. Many artists and large audiences participate. Here are listed some of most important folklore festivals in Kosovo:

- Festivali Flakadani I Karadakut 2012
- Festivali Shqiponjat e Medvegjës
- Gala Koncert i Ansamblit profesional "Rexho Mulliqi"
- Festivali Folklorik "Hasi Jehon" SHAK "Malsori"nga Gjonaj
- Festivali Folklorik "Kushtrimi i Karadakut"
- Festivali Kosovarja Këndon
- Programe me melodi instrumenetale me instrumente frymore tradicionale
- Festivali Rapsodia Shqiptare – Skenderaj
- Festivali folklorik "I Këndojmë Lirisë"
- Festivali Kaçaniku 2012' FSHAKA Kaçaniku
- Festivali Zambaku i Prizrenit

== Authors, singers and composers ==
=== Dervish Shaqa ===
Dervish Shaqa was the most famous rapsod in Kosovo. He was born in 1912 near Deçan. Because of the historical circumstances, in which was Kosovo the time he was alive, almost all of his songs are about war, brave warriors and his homeland. Poetry accompanied with cifteli, was the characteristic of Dervish Shaqa's creations. He is also known as epic songwriter, because of topics of his songs such as: "Great Patriarchies Tanzimat", and "Independence National Renaissance", the period of the lands joining Montenegro and Serbia and songs for great historical personalities, which has made Dervish Shaqa the most anticipated rapsod in Kosovo.

=== Bajrush Doda ===
Bajrush Doda was born in Maznik, Deçan, in 1936. From a young age, Bajrush Doda developed his passion for music and became one of the most prominent rapsodi in the first generation of folk music. Bajrush was one of the foremost rapesodi of the first generation post-war Albanian folk singers from Kosovo, whose voice became known through Radio Prishtina from the late 1960s. Accompanied with his çifteli, he had sung about brave front warriors such as: Isa Boletini, Bajram Curri, Mehmet Pasha, etc. Bajrush Doda is regarded as one of the most notable figures in Albanian folk music from the region of Kosovo and his work influenced generations of listeners.

=== Qamili i Vogel ===
Qamil Muhaxhiri aka Qamili I Vogel, was born in 1923 in Gjakova. He was inspired from traditional musicians in Albania to create a Cultural and Artistic Association in Kosovo. He is well known traditional singer in Kosovo and in Albania for his artistic songs which mostly were dedicated to romance and love. Some of his famous songs are: "Eja t'vejme kurore", "Hajde moj buzeburbuqe", "Na leu dielli", etc. During his career Qamili I Vogel, has collaborated with famous singer such as: Tahir Drenica, Mazllom Mezini, Bajrush Doda, Ismet Peja, Hashim Shala, Nexhmije Pagarusha, etc.

=== Idajet Sejdiu ===
Idajet Sejdiu was born in 1961 near the Šar mountain. He started singing very young, inspired by his grandfather Jusuf. The characteristic about Idajet Sejdiu is that he firstly started to sing without music, his own original lyrics, and he was followed in vocals by other musicians.

== See also ==
- Shkurte Fejza
