= Shkurte Fejza =

Albanian singer (born 1961)

- Born: 18 November 1961 (age 64); Mushtisht, Therandë, Yugoslavia
- Occupations: singer; songwriter; recording artist
- Years active: 1974–present
- Notable work: Oj Kosovë, oj nana ime; Për mëmëdhenë; E kam emrin Kosovar
- Musical career
- Genres: folk; traditional Albanian music

Shkurte Fejza (born 18 November 1961) is a Kosovo Albanian singer best known for her performances in traditional Albanian folk music. She is considered one of the most prominent figures in Kosovo's folk music industry, with a career spanning several decades.

== Early life ==
Shkurte Fejza was born on 18 November 1961 in the village of Mushtisht, in the Therandë (Suhareka) region of Kosovo, then part of the Socialist Federal Republic of Yugoslavia. She completed her primary education in Mushtisht, continued secondary studies in Therandë and later attended school in Prizren and Pristina.

== Career ==
Fejza began her musical career as a young performer in school programs, where her vocal talent was first recognized. In May 1975, she participated in the "Takimet e Majit" festival in Prizren and won the award for “Most Successful Debutante”. She subsequently became a member of the cultural and artistic society "Afërdita", which helped introduce her to audiences throughout Albanian-speaking regions.

During the late 1970s and early 1980s, Fejza regularly performed in music festivals and concerts, including an appearance at the Festival of Gjirokastër in 1978 and at the World Festival of Folklore in the United States, in 1994. She became known for her powerful interpretations of patriotic, lyrical and socially themed folk songs rooted in Albanian tradition.

Under the political restrictions of the 1980s in Yugoslavia, her music was banned from radio and television broadcasts; nevertheless, her recordings continued to spread through video and audio tapes among audiences in Kosovo and beyond.

Fejza's repertoire includes many popular songs that celebrate Albanian identity and history, such as “Oj Kosovë, oj nana ime”, “Mora fjalë”, “Ani mori nuse” and others that often touch on subjects of homeland, family and resilience.

== Awards and recognition ==
In 2013, Fejza was awarded the honorary title "Mjeshtër i Madh" (Great Master) by the President of Albania, Bujar Nishani, recognizing her outstanding contribution to Albanian music and culture.

Over her long career, she has influenced generations of listeners and contributed to the preservation and popularization of traditional Albanian songs in Kosovo and the wider Balkans region.

== Discography ==
- Ç’ke Kosovë që po lëshon za (1987)
- Gurrë e shkrepa (1988)
- Oj Kosovë, oj nana ime (1989)
- Mbahu nëno, mos ke frikë (1990)
- Për mëmëdhenë (1991)
- Kam një lot m’pikon si ar (1992)
- Vdekje s’ka (1995)
- E kam emrin Kosovar (1997)
- Bashkojmë krushqit për Kosovën (1998)
- Këngë e lot (1998)
- Jo nuk ndahet Mitrovica (2000)
- Të dua Kosovë (2002)
- Shqiptari të dua (2005)
