= Rapsodi (JKT48 single) =

Single by JKT48
- A-side: "Rapsodi"
- B-side: "Sweet & Bitter"; "Menanti"; "Mimpi yang Hina - Gesu na Yume"; "Siapa yang Membuat Kita Berdua Bertemu - Dare ga Futari wo Deawaseta no ka?"
- Released: January 9, 2020 (Music Card); January 22, 2020 (Digital download & streaming, "Rapsodi" music video ) February 1, 2020 (streaming, "Sweet & Bitter" music video ) February 29, 2020 (CD+DVD)
- Recorded: December 2019 – Januari 2020
- Studio: Studio 168 (Audio); Plankton Labs ("Rapsodi" Music Video)
- Genre: Pop
- Label: Indonesia Musik Nusantara
- Songwriter: Laleilmanino
- Producers: JKT48 Management & Laleilmanino

Singe singles chronology
| "High Tension" (2019) | "Rapsodi" (2020) | "Cara Ceroboh Untuk Mencinta" (2021) |

Music video
- "Rapsodi" on YouTube "Sweet & Bitter" on YouTube

"Rapsodi" is the 21st single from the idol group JKT48 and is also the first original single from JKT48. This original single was released by Hits Records (for the last time) and dentsuXentertainment, which is now under the license of Indonesia Musik Nusantara since 2022. This single is the result of the JKT48 Original Single Member Selection which was announced on November 30, 2019, with Team KIII member Shani Indira Natio as center. The download card was released on January 9, 2020, and the Regular (CD+DVD) was released on February 29, 2020.

"Rapsodi" was nominated for the category Best Vocal Group Production Work at the AMI Awards 2020.

== Tracklisting ==
CD
| No. | Title | Lyrics | Music | Unit/Singer | Length |
|---|---|---|---|---|---|
| 1. | "Rapsodi" | Laleilmanino | Laleilmanino | Senbatsu | 3:59 |
| 2. | "Sweet & Bitter" | Yasushi Akimoto | Hisashi Shibata | Undergirls | 4:12 |
| 3. | "Menanti" | Astono Handoko, Ramadhan Handyanto Jiwatama | Astono Handoko, Ramadhan Handyanto Jiwatama | Shani Indira Natio | 3:40 |
| 4. | "Mimpi yang Hina" ((Gesu na Yume)) | Yasushi Akimoto | Shinya Sumida | Feni Fitriyanti, Gabriela Margareth Warouw | 4:13 |
| 5. | "Siapa yang Membuat Kita Berdua Bertemu?" (Dare ga Futari wo Deawaseta no ka?) | Yasushi Akimoto | Tatsuji Ueda | Riska Amelia Putri, Ariella Calista Ichwan, Anastasya Narwastu Tety Handuran | 4:28 |

DVD
| No. | Title | Length |
|---|---|---|
| 1. | "Rapsodi (Music Video)" |
| 2. | "Sweet & Bitter (Music Video)" |
| 3. | "MV Rapsodi Behind the Scene" |

Download Card Download Card can choose to download the provided song/download photo content.

| # | Title | Artist |
|---|---|---|
| 1. | Rapsodi | Senbatsu |
| 2. | Sweet & Bitter | Undergirls |

Bonus:

- Purchase of Download Card will get bonus 1 handshake ticket.
- Purchase of CD Album will get bonus 1 random photopack inside.

== Tracklist, members, and trivia ==
=== "Rapsodi" ===
- The first original single from JKT48 written, arranged, and composed by Laleilmanino (Arya Aditya Ramadhya and Ilman Ibrahim from Maliq & D'Essentials, and Anindyo Baskoro from RAN) with the approval of Yasushi Akimoto as the total producer and most of the songwriters of the 48 Group.
- The filming process for the video "Rapsodi" was carried out at Tirtha Bridal, Uluwatu, Badung Regency, Bali.
- "Rapsodi" means an expression of joy according to KBBI. The word was coined by one of the members of the JKT48 management team to replace the word "Melody" during the song-making process with Laleilmanino.
- This song tells the story of a promise between two people to move on to a higher level, namely marriage.
- Front center position: Shani.
- The first senbatsu for Amel, Nadila, Celine, Christy, Diani, Eli, dan Vivi.
- The debut single for the 6th and 7th generation members.
- The last Senbatsu (members chosen to perform the title song/single) for Beby who is the only member of the 1st generation on this single for the last time, and Nadila who is the only member of the 2nd generation who is chosen to perform this single only once.
  - In addition, members of Senbatsu and the last single for Melati, Aby, and Aya, and only once for Diani, Amel, and Vivi.
- The song was first performed at JKT48's 8th Anniversary concert event at Tunjungan Convention Hall, Tunjungan Plaza, Surabaya, East Java on December 22, 2019, and was first performed on television at the "Indosiar 25th Anniversary Special Extraordinary Concert: Indonesian Soccer Awards 2020" event which was broadcast live on Indosiar on January 10, 2020.
- This song was performed on the live broadcast of the JKT48 2 team theater performance, which was broadcast on RCTI+ as an additional song, namely:
  - Team KIII performed this song with Shani in the front center position, before performing the 16th song "To Be Continued" in the setlist "Saka Agari" special 2 years and 200th show on Friday, March 6, 2020.
  - Team J performed this song with Feni in the front center position, before performing the 13th song "Keteguhan Hati Dandelion (Tanpopo no Kesshin)" in the Setlist "Fajar Sang Idola (Idol no Yoake)" special 99th show on Friday, March 13, 2020.
- This song is ranked 39th in JKT48 Request Hour 2021 Setlist Best 30 (2021).
- This song is used as one of the soundtracks of the "Princess Mermaid" miniseries starring Raisya Bawazier, Kenny Austin, Naomi Zaskia, and Cinta Brian. The miniseries produced by Starvision Plus and aired on SCTV from March 16 to April 3, 2020.
- This song was covered by one of the contestants of the talent search competitions Indonesian Idol XII at RCTI, namely Rahman in the 2nd Showcase round, with a unique arrangement concept.
- List of performers by team:
  - Team J: Cindy Hapsari Maharani Pujiantoro Putri (7), Diani Amalia Ramadhani (14), Feni Fitriyanti (2), Nadila Cindi Wantari (5), Riska Amelia Putri (3).
  - Team KIII: Angelina Christy (13), Beby Chaesara Anadila (8), Helisma Mauludzunia Putri Kurnia (15), Nurhayati (4), Shani Indira Natio (1), Shania Gracia (10).
  - Team T: Gabryela Marcelina (6), Jinan Safa Safira (12), Melati Putri Rahel Sesilia (11), Tan Zhi Hui Celine (9).
  - Academy Class A: Viona Fadrin (16).

=== "Sweet & Bitter" ===
- A remake of the song of the same title released as the coupling song for AKB48's 25th single titled Give Me Five.
- In the original song/first released by AKB48, it was performed by 6 members (Selection 6), while in the JKT48 version, it was performed by 16 Undergirls members (a group under Senbatsu).
- Front center position: Desy (who was selected as the 17th position through "JKT48 Original Single Member Selection").
- Last single for Pucchi, Aurel, Desy, Frieska, Rona, Julie, Lala, Fia, Nanda, Yori, and Febi.
- The song was first performed at JKT48's 8th Anniversary concert event at Tunjungan Convention Hall, Tunjungan Plaza, Surabaya, East Java on December 22, 2019.
- List of performers by team:
  - Team J: Ariella Callista Ichwan (29), Aurel Mayori Putri (31), Frieska Anastasia Laksani (20), Gabriela Margareth Warouw (22), Ni Made Ayu Vania Aurellia (24), Rona Anggreani (18), Sania Julia Montolalu (19).
  - Team KIII: Maria Genoveva Natalia Desy Purnamasari Gunawan (17), Yessica Tamara (30).
  - Team T: Fidly Immanda Azzahra (28), Nabila Yussi Fitriana (25), Puti Nadhira Azalia (23), Rinanda Syahputri (32).
  - Team KIII/T: Aninditha Rahma Cahyadi (21)
  - Academy Class A: Dhea Angelia (26), Febi Komaril (27).

=== "Menanti" ===
- The original song was awarded to 1st ranked member in the JKT48 Original Single Member Selection.
- This song was written, arranged, and made into music by Astono Handoko (RAN) and Ramadhan Handy (Soulvibe) with the approval of Yasushi Akimoto as the Total Producer and also the songwriter of most of the 48 Group (same as the Rapsodi song).
- The song was first performed at JKT48's 8th Anniversary concert event at Tunjungan Convention Hall, Tunjungan Plaza, Surabaya, East Java on December 22, 2019.
- This song is performed by Shani Indira Natio (Team KIII) who won first place in the JKT48 Original Single Member Selection.

=== "Mimpi yang Hina (Gesu na Yume)" ===
- A remake of the unit song Team NIII 3rd Stage from Japanese sister group NGT48 and from AKB48 Team Surprise 3rd Stage with the original title in Japanese "Gesu na Yume (下衆な夢)".
- This song was awarded to 2nd ranked member in the JKT48 Original Single Member Selection, namely Feni Fitriyanti.
- The song was first performed at JKT48's 8th Anniversary concert event at Tunjungan Convention Hall, Tunjungan Plaza, Surabaya, East Java on December 22, 2019.
- Lagu ini dibawakan oleh 2 orang: Feni Fitriyanti (Team J) dan Gabriela Margareth Warouw (Team J).

=== "Siapa yang Membuat Kita Berdua Bertemu? (Dare ga Futari wo Deawaseta no ka?)" ===
- A remake version of AKB48 Team Surprise's 2nd Stage Song/Showing Setlist titled "BARA no Gishiki" with its original Japanese title "Dare ga Futari wo Deawaseta no ka? (誰が2人を出合わせたのか？).
- This song was awarded to 3rd ranked member in the JKT48 Original Single Member Selection, namely Riska Amelia Putri.
- The song was first performed at JKT48's 8th Anniversary concert event at Tunjungan Convention Hall, Tunjungan Plaza, Surabaya, East Java on December 22, 2019.
- Tasya is the only non-ranked member in JKT48 Original Single Member Selection who participated in this song.
- Last single for Amel dan Tasya.
- This song is performed by 3 people: Riska Amelia Putri (Team J), Ariella Callista Ichwan (Team J), dan Anastasya Narwastu Tety Handuran (Team KIII) yang sama-sama segenerasi.

== Charts ==
| Chart (2020) | Peak position |
|---|---|
| Indonesia (Billboard Indonesia Top 100) | 21 |
