= Hetaretachi yo =

- Theater edition cover, featuring Yumiko Takino and Nana Okada

Single by STU48
- B-side: "Kōkai Nanka Aruwakenai" (Type-A); "Yume wo Glass Bin no Naka ni" (Type-B); "Ki ni Naranai Kodoku" (Theater)
- Released: October 20, 2021
- Genre: J-pop
- Label: King Records
- Lyricist: Yasushi Akimoto
- Producer: Yasushi Akimoto

STU48 singles chronology
| "Hitorigoto de Kataru Kurainara" (2021) | "Hetaretachi yo" (2021) | "Hana wa Dare no Mono?" (2022) |

Music video
- "Hetaretachi yo" on YouTube
- "Yume wo Glass Bin no Naka ni" on YouTube

"Hetaretachi yo" (Japanese: ヘタレたちよ; lit. 'Hey, Losers') is the seventh single by Japanese idol group STU48, released on October 20, 2021. Yumiko Takino served as lead performer for the title song. The single is the last one featuring Nana Okada, the group's first captain. It topped the Japanese music charts in its release week.

== Production and release ==
The music video for the title song depicts a glamping trip at the uninhabited Kujira Island in Okayama Prefecture and features the members enjoying activities such as fishing, kayaking, and barbecue. For the campfire scene, Takino wrote an actual letter on the shooting day to read to Okada.

The B-side "Ki ni Naranai Kodoku" (気にならない孤独; lit. 'Unconcerned Solitude') is a solo song performed by Yura Ikeda, who took first place at the third AKB48 Group No.1 Singing Ability Contest in December 2020. "Kōkai Nanka Aruwakenai" (後悔なんかあるわけない; "There is No Regret") is Okada's farewell song, performed by all members. "Yume wo Glass Bin no Naka ni" (夢をガラス瓶の中に; "Dreams in A Glass Bottle") was performed by the subunit Katte ni! Shikoku Kanko Taishi, and the music video features the appearance of selected fans, who appeared on the backdrop screens via Zoom video conference.

The album was released in three editions, five including Limited Editions.

== Setorock contest ==
In November, the group announced the Setorock contest, where high school bands from the Setouchi region were invited to send their cover versions of the title song for the chance to serve as backup band at the STU48 Christmas concert and win audio equipment from contest sponsor Yamaha. The group's own rock band subunit, Aoi Himawari, also published their cover version on November 26. The band Crampton from Hiroshima Funairi High School won the contest and performed with the group at the Okayama Civic Hall on December 24, 2021.

== Reception ==
"Hetaretachi yo" sold about 235,000 copies in its release week according to Billboard Japan and placed first in both the Oricon Singles and Billboard Japan Hot 100 charts.

== Track listing ==
=== CD ===
1. "Hetaretachi yo" (ヘタレたちよ)
2. Different tracks on each type:
  - Type A: "Kōkai Nanka Aru Wakenai" (後悔なんかあるわけない)
  - Type B: "Yume wo Garasu Bin no Naka ni" (夢をガラス瓶の中に)
  - Theater: "Ki ni Naranai Kodoku" (気にならない孤独)
3. "Hetaretachi yo" (off-vocal)
4. Instrumental version of track 2

=== DVD ===
1. "Hetaretachi yo" Music Video
2. Different on each type:
  - Type-A: "Nana Okada MV Making and Interview, Part 1" (岡田奈々MV撮影メイキング&インタビュー①)
  - Type-B: "Nana Okada MV Making and Interview, Part 2" (岡田奈々MV撮影メイキング&インタビュー②)

== Personnel ==
=== "Hetaretachi yo" ===
Center: Yumiko Takino

Chiho Ishida, Minami Ishida, Mitsuki Imamura, Hina Iwata, Nana Okada, Cocoa Kai, Miyuna Kadowaki, Yumiko Takino, Akari Fukuda, Honoka Yano, Yuka Oki, Mai Nakamura, Aiko Kojima, Sayaka Takao, Miho Tanaka, Momoka Rissen

=== "Kōkai Nanka Aru Wakenai" ===
Center: Nana Okada

Chiho Ishida, Minami Ishida, Mitsuki Imamura, Hina Iwata, Nana Okada, Cocoa Kai, Miyuna Kadowaki, Miyu Sakaki, Yumiko Takino, Mahina Taniguchi, Aoi Hyōdo, Akari Fukuda, Arisa Mineyoshi, Maiha Morishita, Honoka Yano, Yuka Oki, Soraha Shinano, Mai Nakamura, Yura Ikeda, Miria Imaizumi, Rine Utsumi, Serika Ōsaki, Anna Kawamata, Yūna Kawamata, Riko Kudō, Aiko Kojima, Himeka Sako, Sara Shimizu, Ayaka Suzuki, Sayaka Takao, Reika Taguchi, Miho Tanaka, Yayoi Nakahiro, Sayaka Harada, Yurina Minami, Rika Muneyuki, Rinko Yoshizaki, Sara Yoshida, Momoka Rissen, Natsuki Watanabe

=== "Yume wo Garasu Bin no Naka ni" ===
Center: Miyu Sakaki, Akari Fukuda

Miyu Sakaki, Mahina Taniguchi, Aoi Hyōdo, Akari Fukuda, Yuka Oki, Mai Nakamura, Anna Kawamata, Miho Tanaka, Yayoi Nakahiro, Rika Muneyuki, Rinko Yoshizaki, Momoka Rissen

=== "Ki ni Naranai Kodoku" ===
Yura Ikeda
