= Daisuki na Hito =

- Type A edition cover

Single by STU48
- English title: Beloved Person
- B-side: "Umi no Iro o Shitteiru ka?"; "Which is which?" (Type-A); "Koi wa Kebyo chu" (Type-B); "Ippai no Mizu" (Type-C); "Suki ni Nareta Dakede Shiawase da" (Type-D); "Aoi Lemon" (Theater)
- Released: July 31, 2019
- Genre: J-pop
- Label: King Records
- Lyricist: Yasushi Akimoto
- Producer: Yasushi Akimoto

STU48 singles chronology
"Kaze o Matsu" (2019)	"Daisuki na Hito" (2019)	"Mubō na Yume wa Sameru Koto ga Nai" (2020)

Music video
- "Daisuki na Hito" on YouTube
- "Umi no Iro o Shitteiru ka?" on YouTube

"Daisuki na Hito" (Japanese: 大好きな人; lit. 'Beloved Person') is the third single by Japanese idol group STU48. It was released on July 31, 2019. Yumiko Takino served as lead performer for the title song. It is the first single released after the completion of the group's theater ship, which is featured in the music video. It topped the Japanese music charts in its release week.

== Production and release ==
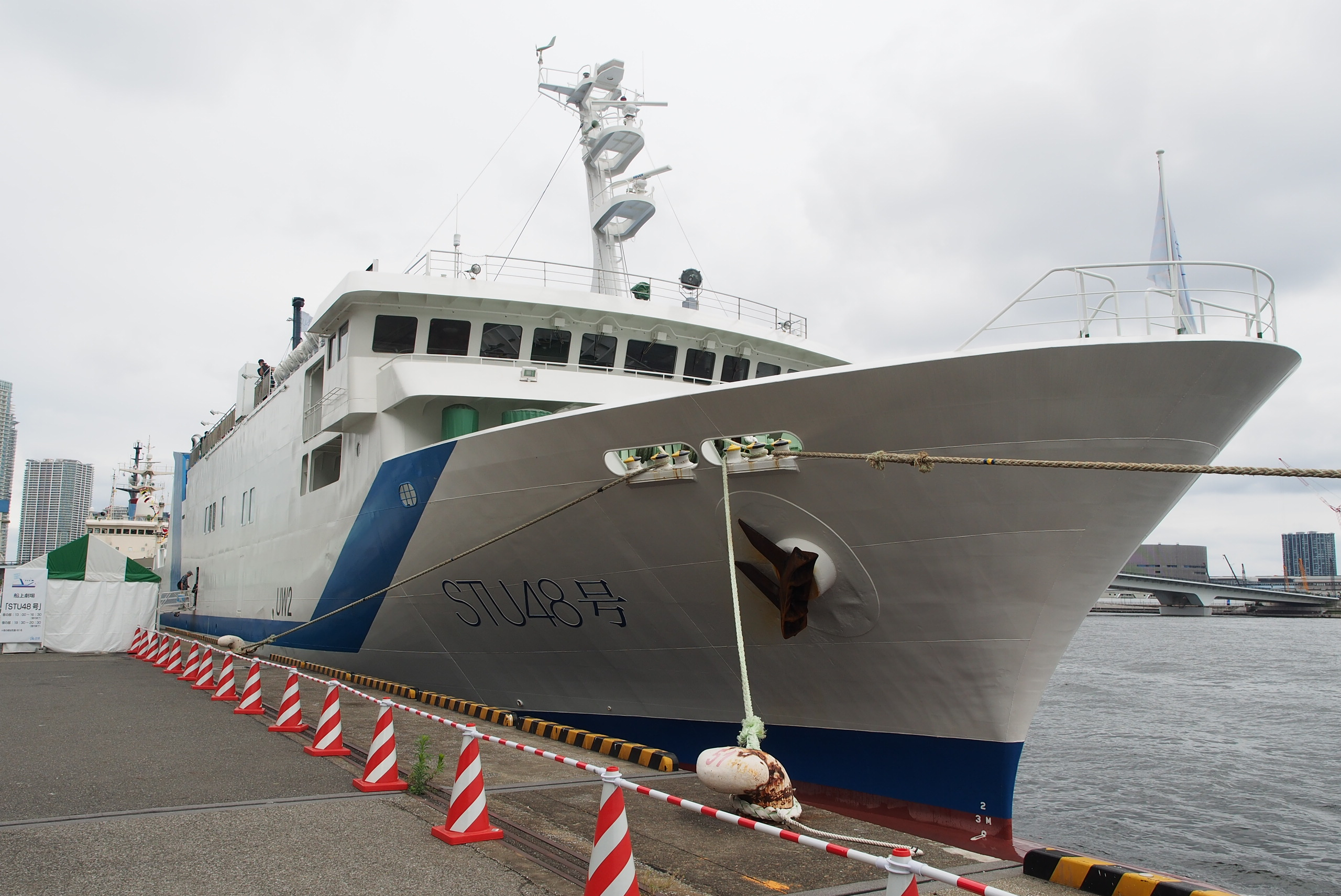
STU48-go

"Daisuki na Hito" is the group's first title song to be performed by all active members and trainees (Fū Yabushita was on health leave), led by Yumiko Takino. The music video was primarily filmed on the STU48-go, the group's theater ship which was in service from 2019 to 2021 and was the first ship in Japan with a shipboard theater. It also features the appearance of around 500 extras recruited through the group's fan club.

The single was released in five editions (nine including Limited Editions). Each edition features a different B-side song performed by an STU48 subunit or the trio STU48 Vocal Senbatsu (STU48ボーカル選抜; lit. 'STU48 Vocalist Selection'). The song by the subunit Katte ni! Shikoku Kanko Taishi, titled "Umi no Iro o Shitteiru ka?", (Note: 海の色を知っているか？; lit. 'Do You Know the Color of the Sea?') was the only one included in all editions and to have a music video, as reward for its members obtaining the highest average score in the "academic ability test" (Japanese language, math, and science) on the group's variety show STU48 Imousu TV (STU48 イ申テレビ). The music video features Shikoku local specialties such as Sanuki udon and "orange juice faucet".

=== Subunit songs ===
These are the subunit songs included in each edition.

Edition	Title	Subunit	Notes
All	"Umi no Iro o Shitteiru ka?"	Katte ni! Shikoku Kanko Taishi	
Type-A	"Which is which?"	STUDIO	
Type-B	"Koi wa Kebyo chu" (Note: 恋は仮病中; lit. 'Love is a Temporary Disease')	Charming Trip	
Type-C	"Ippai no Mizu" (Note: 一杯の水; lit. 'A Glass of Water')	Seto7	
Type-D	"Suki ni Nareta Dakede Shiawase da" (Note: 好きになれただけで幸せだ; lit. 'I'm Happy Just Being in Love With You')	Setomaiku	
Theater	"Aoi Lemon" (Note: 青い檸檬; lit. 'Blue Lemon')	STU48 Vocal Senbatsu	One-shot unit

== Reception ==
"Daisuki na Hito" sold 296,000 copies in its release week according to Billboard Japan and placed first on both the Oricon Singles and Billboard Japan Hot 100 charts.

== Track listing ==
Track list obtained from official website.

=== CD ===
1. "Daisuki na Hito" (大好きな人)
2. "Umi no Iro wo Shitteru ka?" (海の色を知ってるか？)
3. Different tracks on each type:
  - Type A: "Which is Which?"
  - Type B: "Koi wa Kebōchū" (恋は仮病中)
  - Type C: "Ippai no Mizu" (一杯の水)
  - Type D: "Suki ni Nareta Dakede Shiawase da" (好きになれただけで幸せだ)
  - Theater: "Aoi Lemon" (青い檸檬)
4. "Daisuki na Hito" (off-vocal)
5. "Umi no Iro wo Shitteru ka?" (off-vocal)
6. Instrumental version of track 3

=== DVD ===
1. "Daisuki na Hito" Music Video
2. "Umi no Iro wo Shitteru ka?" Music Video

== Personnel ==
Personnel list obtained from official website.

"Daisuki na Hito"

- Center: Yumiko Takino
- Chiho Ishida, Minami Ishida, Kanon Isogai, Ayumi Ichioka, Mitsuki Imamura, Hina Iwata, Nana Okada, Marina Ōtani, Cocoa Kai, Miyuna Kadowaki, Miyu Sakaki, Nonoka Shintani, Yumiko Takino, Kōko Tanaka, Mahina Taniguchi, Yuri Torobu, Aoi Hyōdo, Akari Fukuda, Azusa Fujiwara, Haruka Mishima, Arisa Mineyoshi, Kaho Mori, Maiha Morishita, Honoka Yano, Yuka Oki, Soraha Shinano, Mai Nakamura, Akari Yura

"Umi no Iro wo Shitteru ka?"

- Center: Mai Nakamura
- Miyu Sakaki, Mahina Taniguchi, Aoi Hyōdo, Akari Fukuda, Haruka Mishima, Kaho Mori, Mai Nakamura

"Which is Which?"

- Center: Mitsuki Imamura
- Kanon Isogai, Mitsuki Imamura, Marina Ōtani, Miyuna Kadowaki, Arisa Mineyoshi, Akari Yura

"Koi wa Kebōchū"

- Center: Chiho Ishida
- Chiho Ishida, Minami Ishida, Hina Iwata, Nonoka Shintani, Kōko Tanaka, Yuri Torobu

"Ippai no Mizu"

- Center: Yumiko Takino
- Cocoa Kai, Yumiko Takino, Azusa Fujiwara, Haruka Mishima, Maiha Morishita, Soraha Shinano

"Suki ni Nareta Dakede Shiawase da"

- Center: Honoka Yano
- Nonoka Shintani, Honoka Yano, Cocoa Kai, Yuka Oki, Soraha Shinano, Mai Nakamura

"Aoi Lemon"

- Center: Nana Okada
- Nana Okada, Miyuna Kadowaki, Honoka Yano
