= STU48 =

Japanese idol group

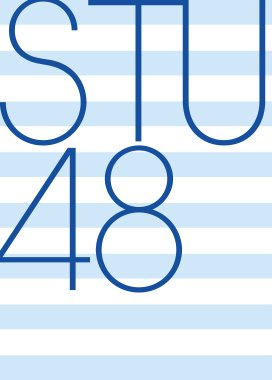

Background information
- Origin: Setouchi Region, Japan
- Genre: J-pop
- Years active: 2017–present
- Label: You, Be Cool!/King Records
- Spinoff of: AKB48 Group
- Members: STU48 members
- Website: www.stu48.com

STU48 (Setouchi48) is a Japanese idol group and sister group of AKB48 named after the Setouchi Region. The group had a shipboard theater (船上劇場, senjō gekijō) from 2019 to 2021. It is co-owned by the tourism board of Setouchi Region and is highly involved in tourism promotions of the region.

== History ==
=== 2016–2017: Foundation ===
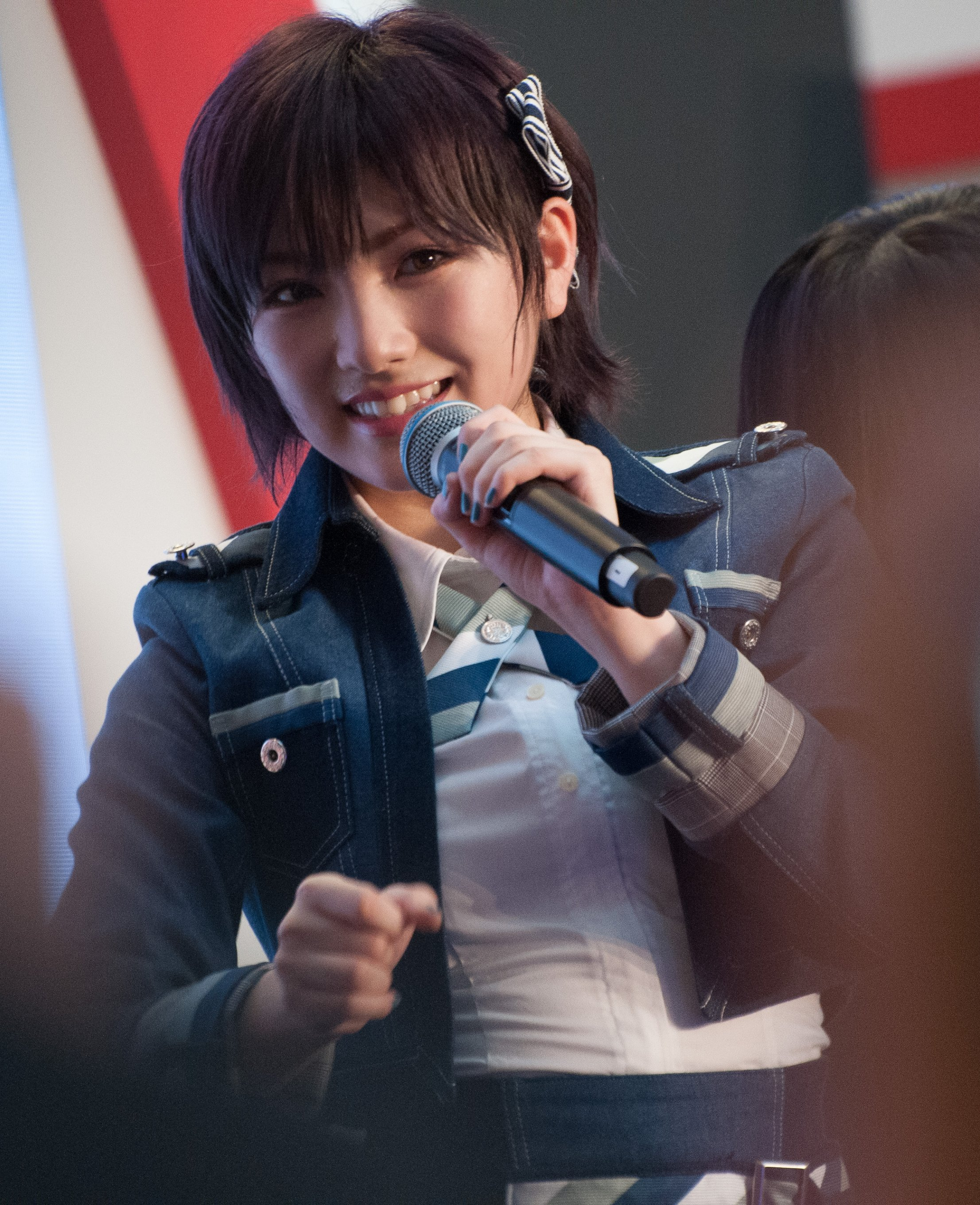
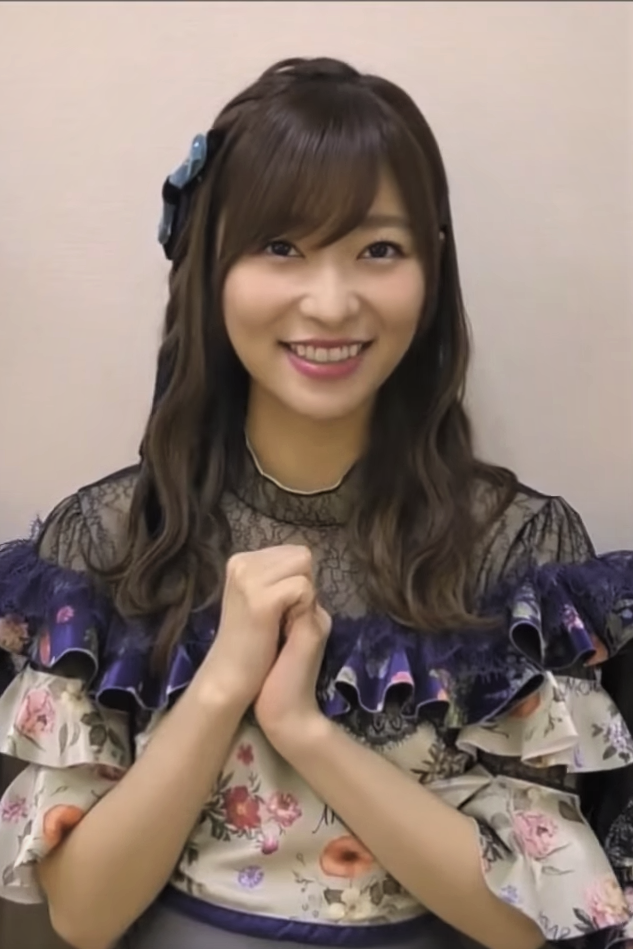
Nana Okada and Rino Sashihara, the first two members of STU48

The formation of STU48 was announced in October 2016. The application period for new members was open from January to February 5, 2017. AKB48 members Mayu Watanabe and Yuki Kashiwagi visited the governments of seven Setouchi prefectures (Hiroshima, Yamaguchi, Ehime, Hyogo, Okayama, Tokushima and Kagawa) between them to promote the auditions. On February 22, it was announced that Nana Okada of AKB48 and Rino Sashihara of HKT48 would be concurrent members of STU48 and respectively hold the positions of captain and theater manager. On March 19, 44 applicants who passed the auditions to become first generation members were introduced, and STU48's first generation was formed with 31 members on March 31.

In April, Setouchi Destination Marketing Organization (DMO), the tourism board of Setouchi Region, announced their support of STU48 in the forms of capital investment, business development support, and assistance in coordinating with local governments.

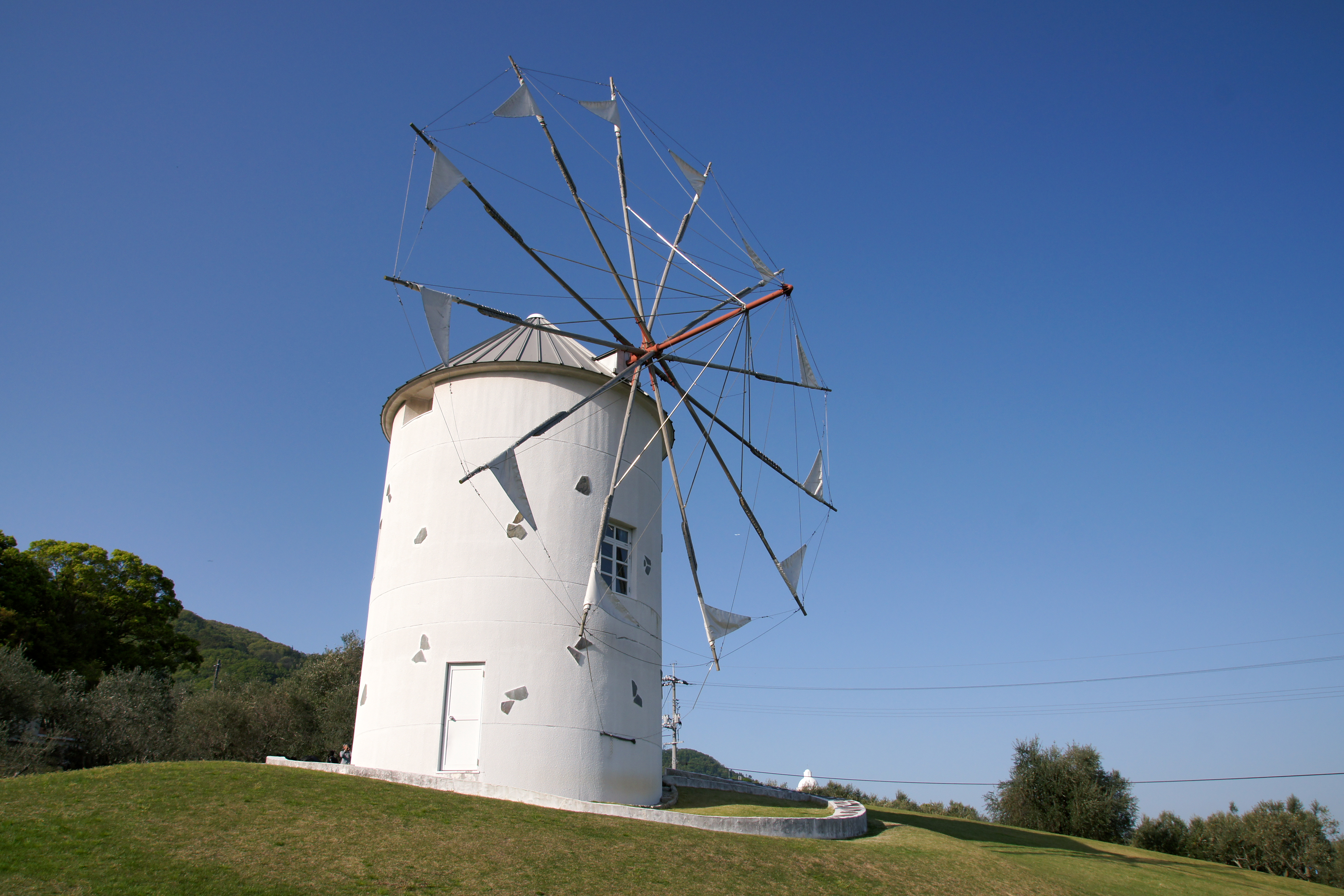
The "Omoidasete Yokatta" music video was filmed at the Shōdoshima Olive Park, Kagawa Prefecture

STU48 made their debut performance on May 3 at the Hiroshima Peace Memorial Park as part of the 2017 Hiroshima Flower Festival. Their first independent live show was on June 3 at the Okayama Mirai Hall. Their first music video, "Setouchi no Koe", was also released in June, and the song was included in the AKB48 single "Negaigoto no Mochigusare". They also participated in the AKB48 single "11gatsu no Anklet", performing the B-side "Omoidasete Yokatta".

On November 25, Rino Sashihara canceled her concurrent position to focus on her activities with HKT48.

=== 2018: Debut single, New Artist Award ===
On January 16, the variety show STU48 no Setobingo! (STU48のセトビンゴ！; STU48's Setobingo!; Unlike the other Bingo! shows, the title is customarily rendered in katakana instead of romaji), based on AKBingo! and hosted by the comedy duo Maple Chōgōkin (Kazlaser and Natsu Ando), started airing on Nippon TV. It would run for 11 episodes.

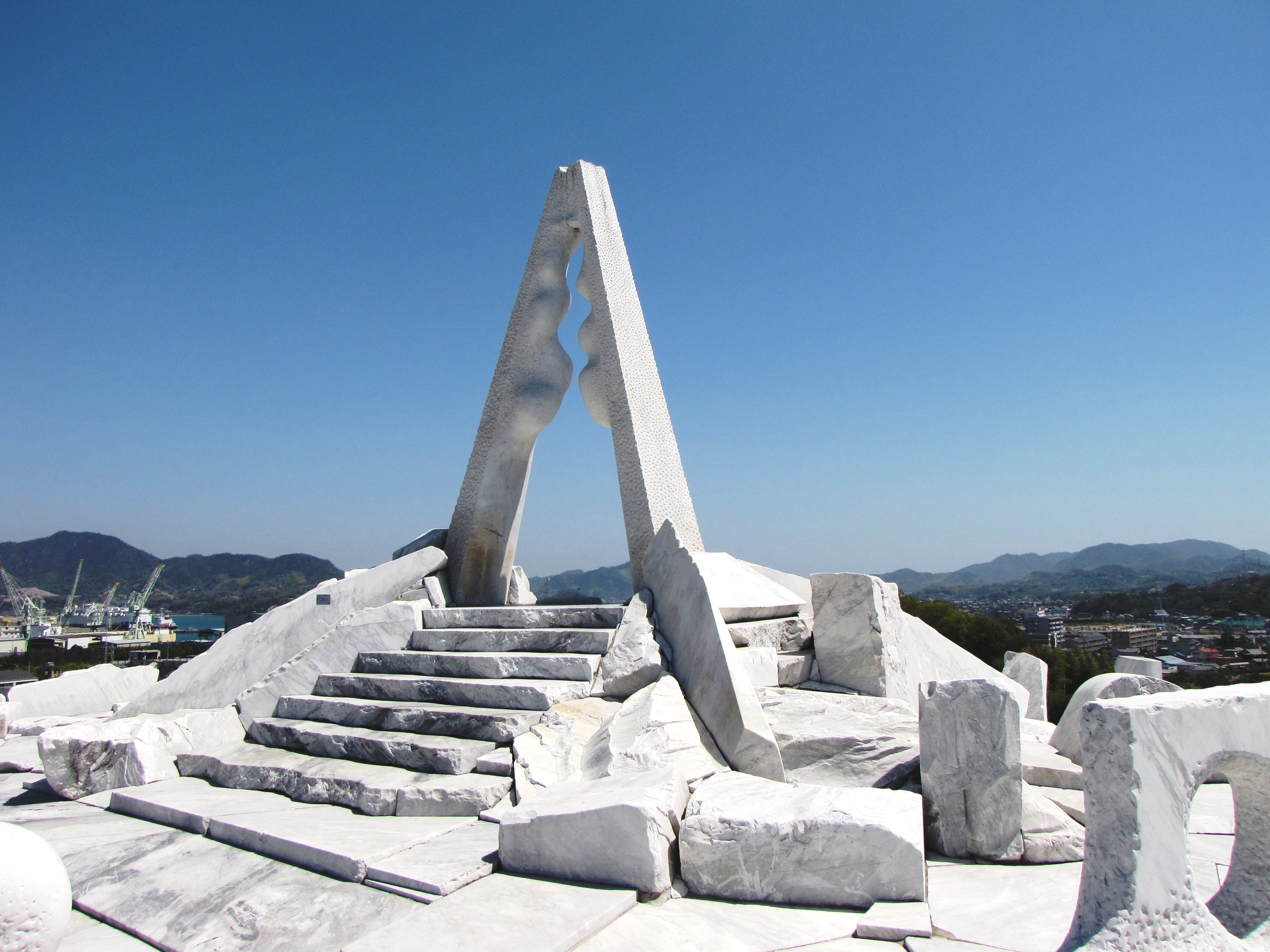
The "Pedal to Sharin to Kita Michi to" music video was filmed at the Hill of Hope in Onomichi

STU48's first single, "Kurayami" (暗闇; "Darkness"), was released on January 31. It sold an estimated 152,003 copies in its first week, according to Billboard Japan. The group also participated in the AKB48 single "Jabaja" released in March, performing the B-side "Pedal to Sharin to Kita Michi to".

On April 14, STU48 theater manager Manabu Yamamoto revealed the ship that would be used for the STU48 theater and announced that it would start operating in summer 2018. However, due to the 2018 Japan floods and other factors, the launch date would be delayed to spring 2019. The release date of their second single, originally planned for August 29, was also postponed to February 13, 2019.

In October, the group announced the formation of five "extra-curricular" subunits. Besides performing music, each of these subunits would also focus on different types of activities. They released their first member guidebook titled Mirai Kōro (未来航路; Future Course) on December 25.

In November, the group was selected as one of the New Artists of The Year for the 60th Japan Record Awards, making them a candidate to win the Japan Record Award for Best New Artist. They are the first group in the AKB48 Group to earn the distinction.

=== 2019: Theater ship launch, second generation recruitment ===
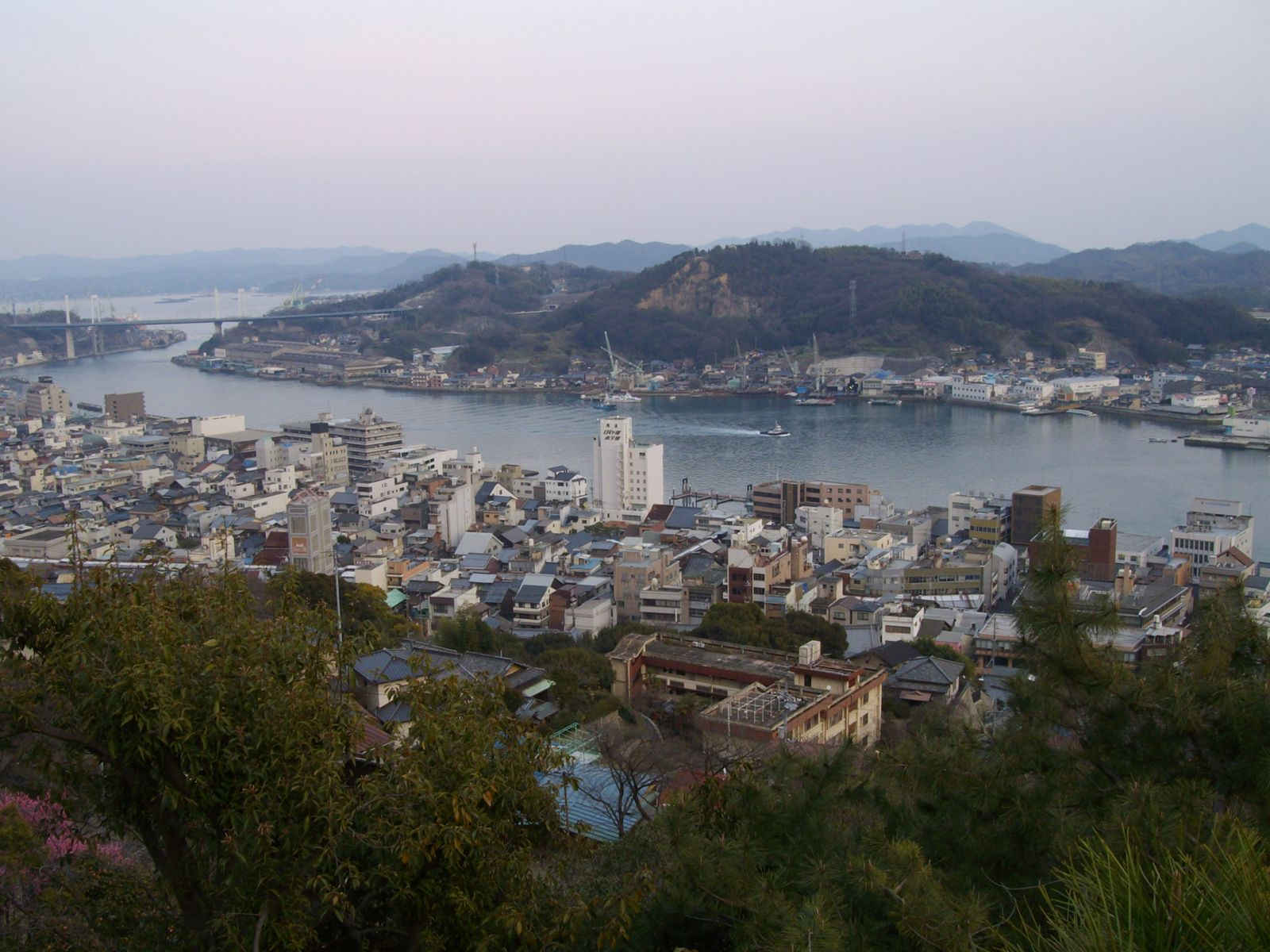
Onomichi cityscape, shown in "Kaze o Matsu" MV

On February 13, STU48 released their second single in five versions. The bonus content included DVDs featuring the members modelling the real-life uniforms of Setouchi schools. First week sales reached an estimated 276,000 copies according to Oricon, doubling that of their debut single. The music video for the title song, "Kaze wo Matsu" (風を待つ; "Waiting for the Wind"), was shot as one long take by quadcopter drone in Onomichi, Hiroshima and released earlier on December 26, 2018.

On April 16, the group's newly remodeled ship, the STU48-go, was officially launched in a ship commissioning ceremony at Hiroshima Port. The event was live streamed on Showroom and attended by Hiroshima Prefecture governor Hidehiko Yuzaki and other government officials. STU48 performed live in the shipboard theater for the first time that evening, with an original stage play titled "GO! GO! little SEABIRDS!!" produced by Nezumi Imamura.

The group's third single was released on July 31. The title song, "Daisuki na Hito" (大好きな人; "Beloved Person"), was performed by all 29 active members and trainees (Fu Yabushita would be absent as she was on hiatus for health reasons), and each subunit would have their own songs. The music video for the title song was released on July 2.

24 new members joined the group as second generation trainees, or "research students" (研究生, kenkyūsei). Their debut performance took place on the STU48-go on December 21 and 22.

=== 2020: Mitsuki Imamura appointed captain, AKB48 Group singing contest ===
STU48's second original stage set list, titled "Bokutachi no Koi no Yokan" (僕たちの恋の予感; "Premonition of Our Love") and produced by then captain Nana Okada, was performed for the first time at the STU48 Theater on the STU48-go on January 11, and included the song "Teokure Caution" (手遅れcaution; "Missed Chance Caution") by =LOVE, an idol group produced by former STU48 and HKT48 member Rino Sashihara. In several interviews, various members commented that the stage play was "interesting" and "difficult to express" since there are several songs with themes unfamiliar to the group, such as "queens and slaves" (dominance and submission) and yuri, but also a good learning experience.

On January 18, during STU48's concert at Tokyo Dome City Hall, Nana Okada announced that she would step down as the group's captain and appointed Mitsuki Imamura as her successor and Akari Fukuda as deputy captain, but would retain her concurrent membership. The fourth single title song, "Mubō na Yume wa Sameru Koto ga Nai" (無謀な夢は覚めることがない; lit. 'Reckless Dreams Never Wake Up'), was performed live for the first time at the concert. The music video was recorded at the Chichibugahama Beach in Kagawa Prefecture and Ushimado Olive Garden in Okayama Prefecture, and features one of the group's most intense dance routines.

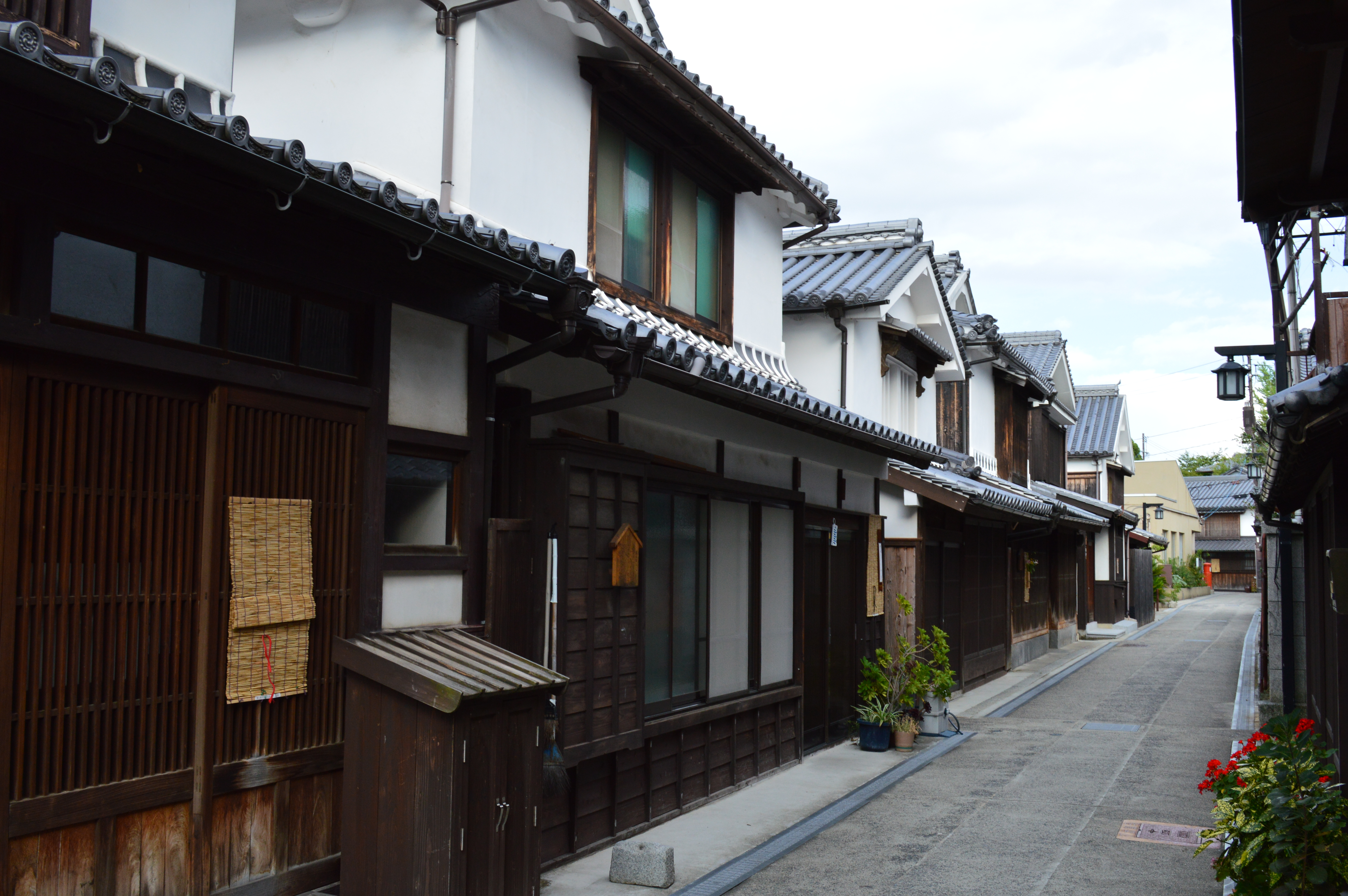
Mitarai preservation district, Kure

On March 28, due to the COVID-19 pandemic, STU48's third anniversary celebration was held via live streaming on the video service Niconico, where the fifth single was announced to be released on May 27. The music video for the title song, "Omoidaseru Koi wo Shiyō" (思い出せる恋をしよう; lit. 'Let's Create A Memorable Love'), was filmed at the Mitarai preservation district in Kure, Hiroshima and released in two versions for the full members and trainees. The single would include ballots to vote for members of a new subunit called the Setouchi PR Unit, which results were announced on October 18.

In June, the group announced the renewal of the subunits and the formation of sister subunits to the existing ones for the second generation trainees. In July, the online community Setouchi Library was launched, in which members can learn and collaborate in projects related to the Setouchi Region with the group's members and subject matter experts. The service was shut down in March 2022.

On December 1, Yura Ikeda and Nana Okada won the first and third places, respectively, at the third AKB48 Group No. 1 Singing Ability Contest (AKB48グループ歌唱力No.1決定戦, AKB 48 gurūpu kashō-ryoku nanbā 1 kettei-sen). Honoka Yano also ranked among the top 8 finalists. Among the six member groups of the AKB48 Group, STU48 had the most members advancing to the finals with seven contestants: Yura Ikeda, Honoka Yano, Nana Okada (represented both STU48 and AKB48), Aiko Kojima, Arisa Mineyoshi, Mahina Taniguchi, and Sara Shimizu (dropped out due to health issues). In an interview, Okada commented that the group's achievements in the contest could be attributed to many members having trained since childhood, naming Actor's School Hiroshima as one of the training grounds, and that singing abilities, while not essential for idols, would open many new opportunities for them.

=== 2021–2022: Theater ship final tour, Nana Okada's departure, New Wave Project ===
On January 15, 2021, STU48 appeared in its first concert at the Nippon Budokan, where they announced the release of their sixth single on February 17 and performed the title song live for the first time. The STU48-go went on its final tour from April 10 to May 23, with the last stop of the tour being Hiroshima Port in Hiroshima City.

On September 12, during the last day of the STU48 summer tour at Hiroshima Sun Plaza Hall, the seventh single was announced. It was also announced that effective October 2021, all active second generation trainees would be promoted into full members. Nana Okada also announced that she would end her concurrency with STU48 after the promotions of the single has ended. Her last concert with the group was on March 18, 2022, at the Kobe Kokusai Hall.

On September 20, STU48 announced a collaboration with Actor's School Hiroshima called the "New Wave Project", an STU48 trainee recruitment project exclusively for active ASH students, at the 2021 ASH Autumn Act. Four New Wave Project participants were announced to have been accepted as STU48 trainees in February 2022 and started their activities in May.

In January 2022, STU48 members took five of the top 8 finalist positions at the fourth AKB48 Group No. 1 Singing Ability Contest, including the top three: Nana Okada (1st place), Yura Ikeda (2nd), Honoka Yano (3rd), Sara Shimizu (5th), and Mitsuki Imamura (7th). Their eighth single "Hana wa Dare no Mono?" was released on April 13. They held their first concert at the Hiroshima Green Arena on July 11 for their fifth anniversary celebration.

=== 2023–2025: Mitsuki Imamura's graduation, Azumi Okada appointed captain ===
On December 24, 2023, during STU48's annual Christmas concert, captain Mitsuki Imamura announced that she will be graduating from the group. Her graduation concert was on March 31, 2024, at the Hiroshima International Conference Center. 2.5th Generation member Azumi Okada took Imamura's place as captain.

=== 2026–present: Abolishment of captain and vice-captain positions ===
In the group's 9th anniversary concert at Kanadevia Hall, Tokyo, on May 30, 2026, captain Azumi Okada and vice-captain Akari Fukuda announced the abolishment of their positions, in order for all members to share equal "sense of ownership" and "responsibility" towards the group. Cocoa Kai, who had been part of Malaysia-based sister group KLP48 for two years and became the first member to return after leaving the group, was announced as the center for the upcoming fourteenth single.

== Former shipboard theater ==
STU48-go
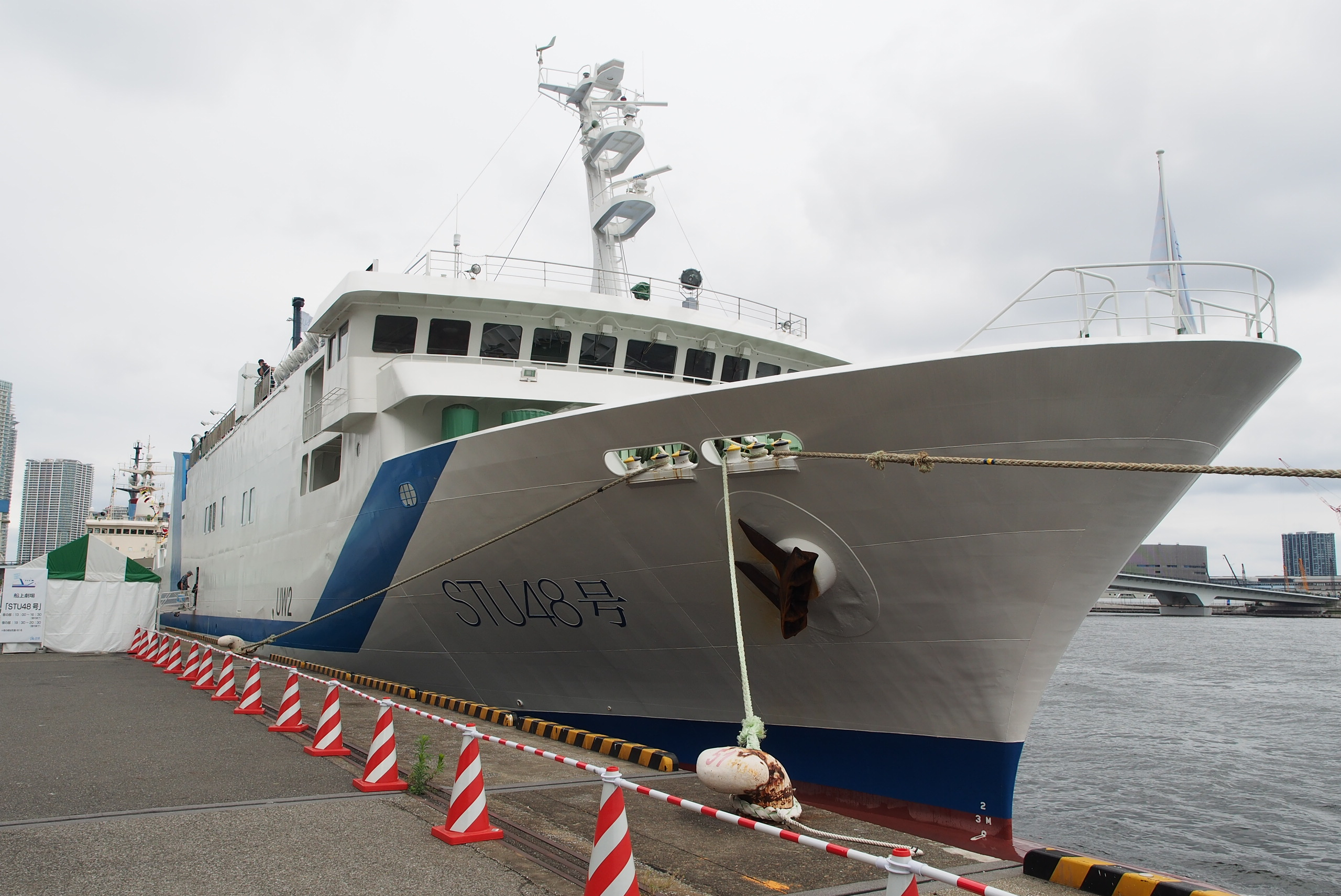
- STU48-go at Harumi Pier, Tokyo

History

Japan
- Name: STU48-go (former), New Izena (former), Mikasa (current)
- Port of registry: Hiroshima Port, Hiroshima, Japan
- Builder: Yamanaka Shipbuilding
- Christened: June 30, 2018
- Completed: May 1998
- In service: April 16, 2019
- Out of service: May 23, 2021
- Identification: Official number: 133761; IMO number: 9199517; MMSI number: 431680121
- Fate: Decommissioned May 23, 2021, ship name reverted to "Mikasa" soon afterward

General characteristics
- Type: passenger ship
- Tonnage: 857 GRT
- Length: 77.8 m
- Beam: 12.5 m
- Draught: 3.2 m
- Depth: 8.24 m
- Installed power: two diesel engines, 5,600 PS
- Speed: 19 knots
- Capacity: 300 guests
- Crew: 14

The former STU48 Theater was situated on a ferry named STU48-go (STU48号) and was the first shipboard theater in Japan. The ship was formerly called Mikasa (みかさ) and operated by Iki-Tsushima Sea Line, and has previously been a passenger ship and a roll-on/roll-off (RORO) cargo ship before acquired by the STU48 management.

The name of the ship was decided through contest, which was announced on May 11, 2018, by the STU48 management. From around 2000 names which were submitted, 24 were chosen by the members for the final voting by fans on June 30 through the streaming app SHOWROOM, and STU48-go earned the most votes (9.8%), making it the new name of the ship.

The remodeling of STU48-go was carried out at the Japan Marine United facilities in Onomichi, Hiroshima with technical support from the Ministry of Land, Infrastructure, Transport and Tourism, especially concerning safety measures. Several STU48 members visited the shipyard during the process, and Azusa Fujiwara and Honoka Yano personally painted the ship's name on her bow. On January 22, 2019, the group released a music video for the song "Shukkō" (出航; "Setting Sail") from their then upcoming second single, which was shot on the ship and unfinished onboard theater and performed by all 33 members and trainees active at the time.

On February 25, the group released a list of ports in the Setouchi Region where the ship was planned to dock for performances. On March 19, the certificate of nationality for the ship was issued. The ship was officially commissioned on April 16.

The port and starboard hulls of the ship bore the code "UW2", which means "Welcome" in maritime flag signaling.

On July 15, STU48-go was present at the Marine Day event organized by the C to Sea Project, held at the Port of Tokyo.

On July 9, 2020, the STU48 management announced that the shipboard theater would be decommissioned in the spring of 2021, and that performances would be held around the Setouchi Region with no fixed venue. On February 7, 2021, the ship's last tour was announced, starting on April 10 and ending on May 23, with the last stop of the tour being Hiroshima Port in Hiroshima City. The ship has since been returned to Iki-Tsushima Sea Line and renamed back to Mikasa.

== Reception ==
In a January 23, 2019 article, Tokyo Sports remarked that STU48 has the "highest level of stage performance" in the AKB48 Group, and that many of its members have a "neat" image similar to that of Nogizaka46. Since Nogizaka46 and the other Sakamichi Series groups do not have their own theaters, STU48 has the opportunity to win over fans who wish for closer interaction through their regular theater performances. The article also predicted that the NGT48 assault scandal, which came to light earlier that month, might cause that group's fans to switch to STU48, in part due to captain Nana Okada's "dislike of disturbance" and "ability to keep the members disciplined".

== Awards ==
The following table lists some of the major awards received by the group.

Year	Ceremony	Award	Nominated work	Result
2018	60th Japan Record Awards	New Artist Award	STU48	Won
2019	11th CD Shop Awards	Shikoku Block Award	"Kurayami"	Won

== Subunits ==
These are the active subunits as of June 2026. All members belong to at least one subunit.

=== Girls' journey units ===
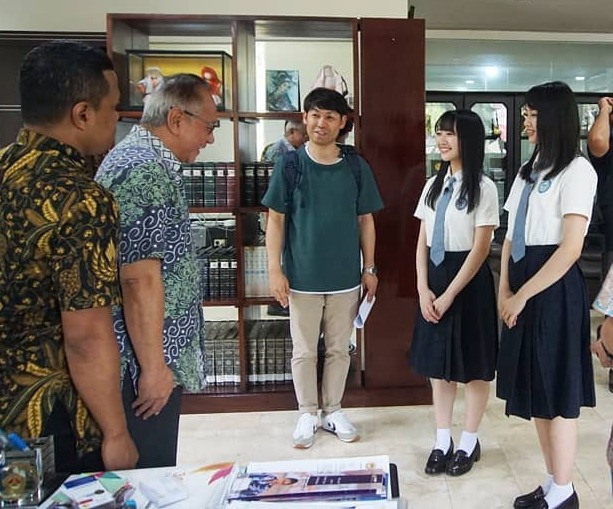
Charming Trip leader Chiho Ishida and STU48 center Yumiko Takino visiting Darma Persada University, Jakarta, Indonesia (2019)

The theme of "girls' journey" refers to literally visiting Setouchi tourism destinations and promoting them domestically and overseas and exploring the world of beauty and fashion. They have their own travel-related television programs, such as STU48 no IttekimaSU! (STU48の行ってきまSU!; "STU48's We're Leaving!") on Shinhiroshima Telecasting and STU48 Furusato Senden LABO (STU48 ふるさと宣伝LABO; "STU48 Hometown Promotion Lab") on Yamaguchi Broadcasting.

==== Charming Trip ====
Native name	Charming Trip
Theme	Girls' Journey (女子旅)
Leader	Sara Yoshida
Members	Sayaka Takao, Sayaka Harada, Natsuki Watanabe, Yuka Kurushima, Ria Arai, Yuina Okuda

==== little Charming Trip ====
Native name	little Charming Trip
Theme	Girls' Journey (女子旅)
Members	None

=== Shikoku units ===
These units promote Shikoku, one of Japan's five major islands, especially its less-known interesting places and activities.

==== Katte ni! Shikoku Kanko Taishi ====
Native name	勝手に！四国観光大使 (Do As You Like! Shikoku Tourism Ambassadors)
Theme	Shikoku Island Tourism
Leader	Akari Fukuda
Members	Mahina Taniguchi, Aoi Hyōdo (concurrently with STUDIO), Mai Nakamura, Rika Muneyuki, Azumi Okada, Yūna Ishihara, Ichigo Kitazawa

==== Katte ni! Shikoku Kanko Guide ====
Native name	勝手に！四国観光ガイド (Do As You Like! Shikoku Tourism Guides)
Theme	Shikoku Island Tourism
Members	None

=== Performance units ===
The performance units focus on singing and dancing skills.

==== STUDIO ====
Native name	STUDIO
Theme	Performance (singing and dancing)
Leader	Yura Ikeda
Members	Aoi Hyōdo (concurrently with Katte ni! Shikoku Kanko Taishi), Himeka Sako, Sara Shimizu, Rio Okamura, Himena Morisue

On November 15, 2018, Imamura and Miyuna Kadowaki were two of the three 48 Group members (the third being Hijiri Tanikawa of AKB48) selected to become the lead performers for the "No Way Man" live performance in Best Hits Kayosai, replacing the members who transferred to IZ*ONE (namely Hitomi Honda of AKB48 and Sakura Miyawaki and Nako Yabuki of HKT48), after passing the dance audition held by Yomiuri TV.

==== mini STUDIO ====
Native name	mini STUDIO
Theme	Performance (singing and dancing)
Members	None

=== MC & sports units ===
==== MiKER! ====
Native name	MiKER!
Theme	MC & Sports
Leader	Soraha Shinano
Members	Cocoa Kai, Rine Utsumi, Serika Osaki, Yūna Kawamata, Riko Kudō, Noa Morokuzu, Hibiki Hamada

MiKER! is a merger between the former MC unit Setomaiku (せとまいく) and sports unit Seto 7 (瀬戸7). Kai and Shinano were members of both units.

On November 3, 2018, Kai, Takino, and former Seto 7 member Maiha Morishita participated in the 38th Hiroshima International Peace Marathon.

==== pin MiKER! ====
Native name	pin MiKER!
Theme	MC & Sports
Members	None

=== Aoi Himawari ===
Native name	青い向日葵 (Blue Sunflower)
Theme	Girl Band
Leader	
Members	Aoi Hyōdo (bass), Akari Fukuda (keyboard)

Aoi Himawari is the only unit which includes a former STU48 member, Miyu Sakaki, and all the other members are concurrently members of other units.

On September 26, 2021, they held their first solo live at the Cave-Be live house in Hiroshima.

=== Setouchi PR Unit ===
==== Original ====
Native name	瀬戸内PR部隊
Theme	Setouchi Region public relations
Members (by votes)	Chiho Ishida Yūka Oki Yumiko Takino Akari Fukuda Hina Iwata
Former members	Miyuna Kadowaki (#1) Fū Yabushita (#5)

Membership into this unit was based on fan voting using the ballots included with the fifth single.

==== Season 2 ====
Native name	瀬戸内PR部隊Season2
Theme	Setouchi Region public relations
Members (by votes)	Chiho Ishida Yuka Oki Akari Fukuda Serika Osaki Mai Nakamura Rinko Yoshizaki Sayaka Takao

The voting for the second Setouchi PR Unit took place from April 13 to May 2, 2022, using ballots included with the eighth single. The results were announced on May 23.

== Members ==
=== Regular members ===
==== 1st Generation ====
The first generation members of STU48 originally consisted of 31 people and joined the group on March 31, 2017.

Name	Birth date	Remarks			
Name	Birth date	Remarks	Cocoa Kai (甲斐心愛)	November 28, 2003 (age 22)	Transferred to KLP48 on June 1, 2024. Returned in 2026.
Mahina Taniguchi (谷口茉妃菜)	February 3, 2000 (age 26)				
Aoi Hyōdo (兵頭葵)	January 18, 2001 (age 25)				
Akari Fukuda (福田朱里)	March 29, 1999 (age 27)				

==== 3rd Draft ====
The 3rd Draft members were recruited at the third AKB48 Group Draft Conference, a joint audition for AKB48 and all its Japan-based sister groups. Originally consisting of five people, they debuted as trainees in January 2018. Two trainees left the group and the three remaining ones became full members on August 3, 2019.

Name	Birth date	Remarks		
Name	Birth date	Remarks	Soraha Shinano (信濃宙花)	August 9, 2003 (age 23)
Mai Nakamura (中村舞)	April 4, 1999 (age 27)			

==== 2nd Generation ====
The second generation member recruitment began in August 2019. 24 people who passed the auditions debuted as trainees in December 2019 and the remaining ones became full members in October 2021.

Name	Birth date	Remarks
Yura Ikeda (池田裕楽)	February 8, 2004 (age 22)	
Utsumi Rine (内海里音)	November 5, 2002 (age 23)	
Serika Osaki (尾崎世里花)	November 16, 1997 (age 28)	
Yūna Kawamata (川又優菜)	December 10, 2003 (age 22)	
Riko Kudō (工藤理子)	March 29, 2002 (age 24)	
Himeka Sako (迫姫華)	March 14, 2007 (age 19)	
Sara Shimizu (清水紗良)	February 12, 2006 (age 20)	
Sayaka Takao (高雄さやか)	December 4, 1998 (age 27)	
Reika Taguchi (田口玲佳)	June 2, 2001 (age 25)	
Sayaka Harada (原田清花)	June 19, 2001 (age 25)	
Rika Muneyuki (宗雪里香)	June 15, 2000 (age 26)	
Sara Yoshida (吉田彩良)	February 19, 2002 (age 24)	
Natsuki Watanabe (渡辺菜月)	December 12, 2000 (age 25)	

==== 2.5th Generation ====
This batch was recruited through the New Wave recruitment project, held exclusively for Actor's School Hiroshima students, and was originally referred to as the New Wave Project trainees. Four candidates who passed the auditions debuted as trainees in May 2022. It was officially designated 2.5th Generation during the group's sixth anniversary concert.

On April 1, 2024, following Mitsuki Imamura's graduation, all its members became full members.

Name	Birth date	Remarks
Azumi Okada (岡田あずみ)	January 20, 2003 (age 23)	
Rio Okamura (岡村梨央)	October 8, 2008 (age 18)	
Yuka Kurushima (久留島優果)	September 24, 2005 (age 21)	
Noa Morokuzu (諸葛望愛)	November 11, 2009 (age 16)	

==== 3rd Generation ====
Name	Birth date	Remarks
Ria Arai (新井梨杏)	October 5, 2008 (age 18)	
Yūna Ishihara (石原侑奈)	August 7, 2004 (age 22)	
Yuina Okuda (奥田唯菜)	July 7, 2006 (age 20)	
Ichigo Kitazawa (北澤苺)	December 27, 2004 (age 21)	
Hibiki Hamada (濵田響)	January 23, 2003 (age 23)	
Himena Morisue (森末妃奈)	June 20, 2002 (age 24)	

=== Trainees ===
==== 4th Generation ====
Name	Birth date	Remarks
Haruna Ishimatsu (石松陽菜)	January 3, 2009 (age 17)	
Kurea Inoue (井上久伶杏)	March 28, 2010 (age 16)	
Mana Kabutake (蕪竹真奈)	April 4, 2005 (age 21)	
Hinayo Kihara (木原姫花世)	October 12, 2012 (age 14)	
Nayu Komatsu (小松奈侑)	December 8, 2005 (age 20)	
Towana Sakaki (坂木叶愛)	December 15, 2011 (age 14)	
Ai Sakazaki (坂崎愛)	September 5, 2004 (age 22)	
Sayaka Shimada (島田紗香)	June 2, 2007 (age 19)	
Ako Sogabe (曽我部あこ)	March 27, 2009 (age 17)	
Shiori Takamura (髙村栞里)	June 30, 2002 (age 24)	Former member of Fujikoes
Nanako Tanaka (田中奈菜子)	January 27, 2006 (age 20)	
Runa Dōho (道保琉南)	November 2, 2007 (age 18)	
Rio Nonaka (野中莉央)	October 26, 2012 (age 13)	Youngest member of STU48
Mii Hamada (濵田美惟)	June 19, 2008 (age 18)	
Amu Fujita (藤田愛結)	August 23, 2010 (age 16)	
Maaya Miyoshi (三好真綺)	April 17, 2011 (age 15)	
Yūna Yagi (屋木優菜)	February 11, 2008 (age 18)	
Yuina Yokoi (横井結菜)	September 27, 2007 (age 19)	

=== Former members ===
Name	Birth date	Notes			
Name	Birth date	Notes	Yui Kuroiwa (黒岩唯)	August 11, 2002 (age 24)	Graduated on November 18, 2017
Rino Sashihara (指原莉乃)	November 21, 1992 (age 33)	Concurrent position ended on November 25, 2017			
Mami Ozaki (尾﨑舞美)	December 18, 2000 (age 25)	Graduated on March 25, 2018			
Orie Cho (張織慧)	October 18, 2001 (age 25)	Graduated on April 13, 2018			
Aiko Mizoguchi (溝口亜以子)	August 20, 2001 (age 25)	Graduated in March 2019			
Akari Yura (由良朱合)	March 12, 1999 (age 27)	Graduated in August 2019			
Ayumi Ichioka (市岡愛弓)	August 21, 2003 (age 23)	Graduated in August 2019. Joined ≒Joy under the name Ayumi Ichihara			
Maemura Himea (前村姫亜)	June 14, 2007 (age 19)	Graduated in December 2019			
Kanon Isogai (磯貝花音)	June 1, 2000 (age 26)	Joined Sophià la Mode in January 2026			
Momona Kadota (門田桃奈)	August 26, 1999 (age 27)				
Saki Sugahara (菅原早記)	November 14, 2001 (age 24)				
Haruka Sano (佐野遥)	August 16, 1995 (age 31)				
Hinako Shioi (塩井日奈子)	January 7, 2000 (age 26)				
Yuri Torobu (土路生優里)	March 24, 1999 (age 27)				
Azusa Fujiwara (藤原あずさ)	May 10, 1998 (age 28)				
Haruka Mishima (三島遥香)	April 18, 1998 (age 28)				
Kaho Mori (森香穂)	June 1, 1997 (age 29)				
Arisu Kondō (近藤ありす)	February 13, 2003 (age 23)				
Nonoka Shintani (新谷野々花)	May 23, 2004 (age 22)	Graduated on July 31, 2020			
Kōko Tanaka (田中皓子)	June 16, 1996 (age 30)	Graduated on March 21, 2021			
Marina Otani (大谷満理奈)	February 14, 2004 (age 22)	Graduated on June 4, 2021			
Natsuki Tamura (田村菜月)	August 4, 2002 (age 24)	Graduated on July 25, 2021			
Fū Yabushita (薮下楓)	October 7, 2000 (age 26)	Graduated on August 8, 2021; retired from entertainment afterward			
Miria Imaizumi (今泉美莉愛)	October 5, 2001 (age 25)	Resigned on October 12, 2021			
Yayoi Nakahiro (中廣弥生)	March 29, 2002 (age 24)	Resigned on October 12, 2021			
Yurina Minami (南有梨菜)	December 18, 2002 (age 23)	Resigned on October 12, 2021			
Miyuna Kadowaki (門脇実優菜)	March 13, 2003 (age 23)	Graduated on November 18, 2021			
Miyu Sakaki (榊美優)	April 28, 2002 (age 24)	Graduated on December 28, 2021. Joined the group Level7			
Nana Okada (岡田奈々)	November 7, 1997 (age 28)	Concurrent position ended on March 18, 2022			
Honoka Yano (矢野帆夏)	August 6, 1999 (age 27)	Graduated on September 23, 2022; planned to retire from entertainment afterward but returned in 2023			
Miho Tanaka (田中美帆)	September 3, 2002 (age 24)	Graduated on March 26, 2023; joined the group My Fav			
Rinko Yoshizaki (吉崎凜子)	September 8, 2002 (age 24)	Graduated on April 29, 2023			
Anna Kawamata (川又あん奈)	November 4, 2002 (age 23)	Graduated on November 5, 2023; joined the group My Fav			
Yumiko Takino (瀧野由美子)	September 24, 1997 (age 29)	Graduated on November 30, 2023			
Mitsuki Imamura (今村美月)	February 19, 2000 (age 26)	Graduated on March 31, 2024			
Minami Ishida (石田みなみ)	October 11, 1998 (age 28)	Graduated on April 6, 2024			
Momoka Rissen (立仙百佳)	November 30, 2004 (age 21)	Graduated on April 7, 2024			
Hina Iwata (岩田陽菜)	February 23, 2003 (age 23)	Graduated on April 20, 2024			
Yūka Oki (沖侑果)	December 1, 1999 (age 26)	Graduated on April 20, 2024			
Ayaka Suzuki (鈴木彩夏)	August 24, 2000 (age 26)	Graduated on April 29, 2024			
Noa Hasegawa (長谷川乃彩)	September 19, 2004 (age 22)	Resigned on June 14, 2024			
Kasumi Iwasaki (岩﨑春望)	April 7, 2006 (age 20)	Withdrew from the group on June 30, 2024.			
Rie Fujii (藤井里詠)	November 3, 2005 (age 20)	Withdrew from the group on July 20, 2024. Joined the agency Asobinext on September 1, 2024.			
Maiha Morishita (森下舞羽)	October 4, 2004 (age 22)	Graduated on July 31, 2024			
Aiko Kojima (小島愛子)	December 7, 1997 (age 28)	Graduated on November 30, 2024			
Miu Kajiwara (梶原未羽)	August 11, 2009 (age 17)	Withdrew from the group on December 8, 2024.			
Arisa Mineyoshi (峯吉愛梨沙)	September 2, 2004 (age 22)	Graduation performance on March 30, 2025. Joined girl group BNSI under the name Lisa on August 3, 2025.			
Kanau Ide (井出叶)	November 2, 2004 (age 21)	Graduation performance on April 15, 2025. Joined Asobisystem girl group log you.			
Saki Sogawa (曽川咲葵)	August 19, 2005 (age 21)	Graduation performance on April 11, 2026.			
Chiho Ishida (石田千穂)	March 17, 2002 (age 24)	Graduation performance on June 7, 2026.			

== Discography ==
=== Singles ===
Title	Year	Peak chart positions		Sales		
Title	Year	JPN	JPN Hot	Oricon		Billboard Japan
Title	Year	JPN	JPN Hot	First week	Total	Billboard Japan
"Kurayami" (暗闇)	2018	1	1	136,456	186,276	201,772
"Kaze wo Matsu" (風を待つ)	2019	1	1	276,316	308,983	337,906
"Daisuki na Hito" (大好きな人)	2019	1	1	254,007	266,797	311,353
"Mubō na Yume wa Sameru Koto ga Nai" (無謀な夢は覚めることがない)	2020	1	1	287,713	292,738	332,691
"Omoidaseru Koi o Shiyō" (思い出せる恋をしよう)	2020	1	1	164,000	213,940	219,515
"Hitorigoto de Kataru Kurainara" (独り言で語るくらいなら)	2021	2	2	175,092	236,317	239,438
"Hetaretachi yo" (ヘタレたちよ)	2021	1	1	185,975	238,285	291,407
"Hana wa Dare no Mono?" (花は誰のもの？)	2022	2	2	157,539	280,684	429,998
"Iki o Suru Kokoro" (息をする心)	2023	2	2	217,153		399,265
"Kimi wa Nani o Kokai Suru no ka?" (君は何を後悔するのか?)	2023	1	4	176,587	—	389,655
"Chiheisen o Miteiru ka?" (地平線を見ているか？)	2025	1	3	110,341	—	272,616
"Kizutsuku Koto ga Seishun da" (傷つくことが青春だ)	2025	1	4	126,374	—	
"Sukisugite Naku" (好きすぎて泣く)	2026	1	4	121,385	—	
"Fuyufuku ni Kigaetara" (冬服に着替えたら)	2026	2	4	129,038	—	

=== AKB48 single B-sides ===
- "Setouchi no Koe" ("Negaigoto no Mochigusare", 2017), included again in "Kurayami" in 2018
- "Omoidasete Yokatta" ("11gatsu no Anklet", 2017)
- "Pedal to Sharin to Kita Michi to" ("Jabaja", 2018)
