= Kurayami =

- Type-A cover, featuring Yumiko Takino

Single by STU48
- B-side: "Setouchi no Koe"; "STU48" (7 regional variants + all-Setouchi version); "Hizenryoku" (Type-A & Type-B); "Kataomoi no Iriguchi" (Type-C & Type-D); "Bokutachi wa Sinbad da" (Type-E & Type-F); "Dareka ga Itsuka Suki da to Itte Kureru Hi Made" (Type-G & Theater)
- Released: January 31, 2018
- Genre: J-pop
- Label: King Records
- Lyricist: Yasushi Akimoto
- Producer: Yasushi Akimoto

STU48 singles chronology
"Kurayami" (2018)	"Kaze o Matsu" (2019)

Music video
- "Kurayami" on YouTube
- "Setouchi no Koe" on YouTube

"Kurayami" (Japanese: 暗闇; lit. 'Darkness') is the debut single by Japanese idol group STU48, released on January 31, 2018. Yumiko Takino served as lead performer for the title song. It topped the Japanese music charts in its release week.

== Production and release ==
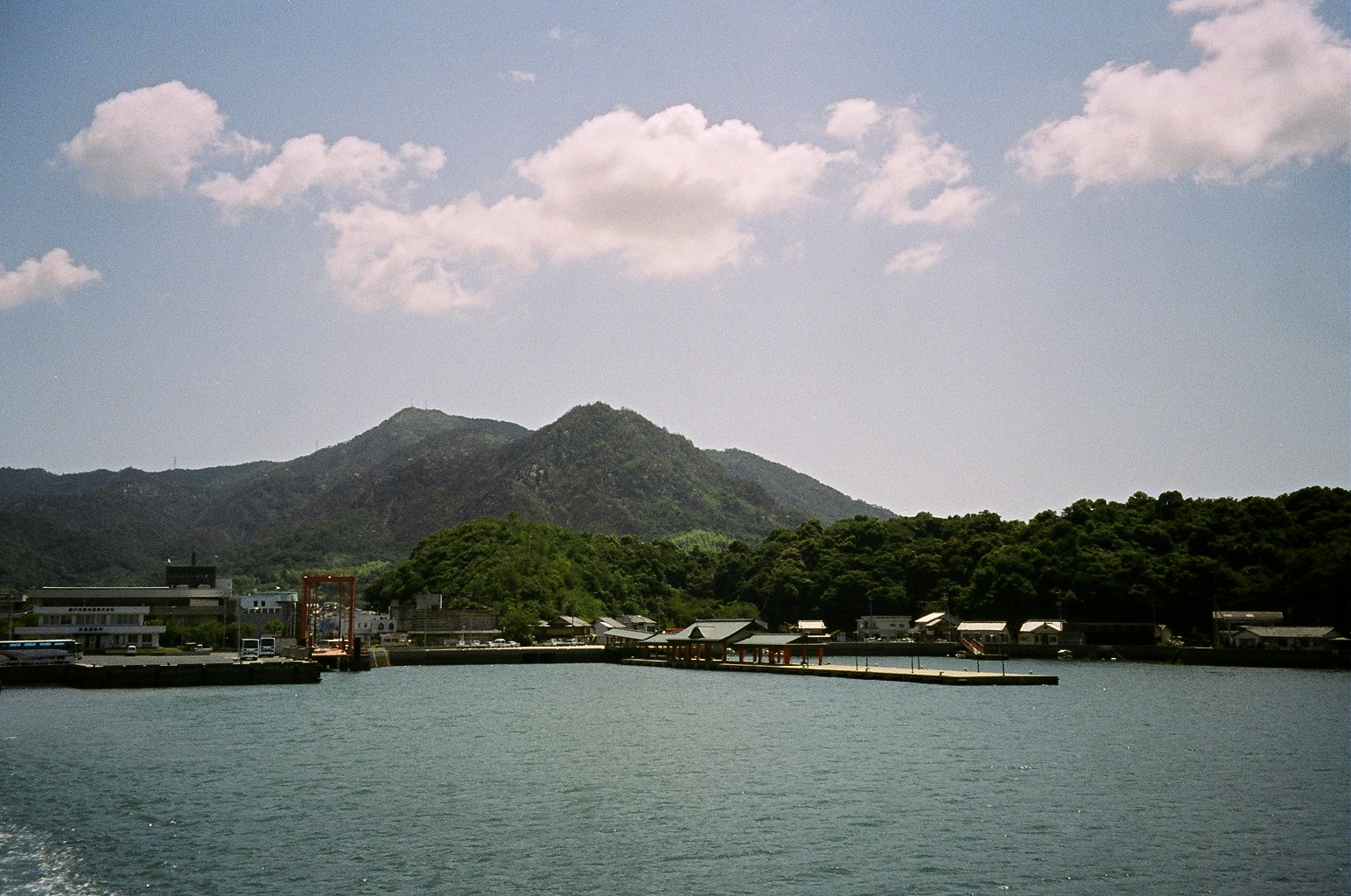
Miyaura Port in Omishima appears in the "Kurayami" MV

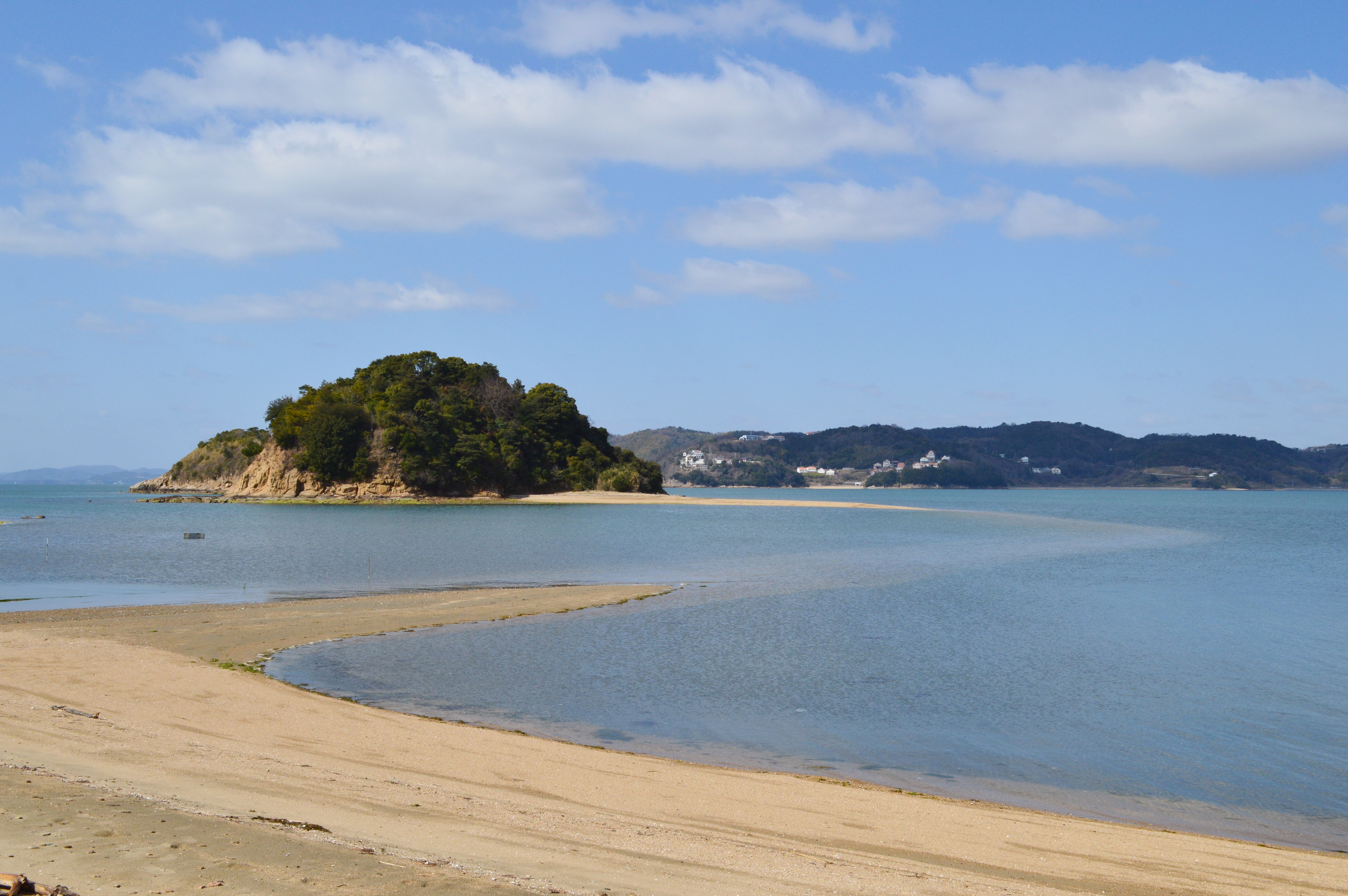
The Kuroshima Venus Road, Okayama Prefecture, featured in the "Setouchi no Koe" MV final scene

The music video for the title song, filmed on the islands of Omishima and Hakatajima in Ehime Prefecture, was released on December 25, 2017. The music video for "Setouchi no Koe", the group's first original song, was filmed at various locations in seven Setouchi region prefectures and was released earlier on June 5, and is the only STU48 music video featuring founding member Rino Sashihara, who left the group in November 2017.

The title song has different dance routines for the music video and live performances, with the music video choreographed by Hiroshima-based Flex Dance Agency and live performances by Cre8boy. "Setouchi no Koe" was also choreographed by Flex Dance Agency.

The single was released in eight editions, fifteen including Limited Editions. The B-side of each edition features a different version of the song "STU48" representing one of seven Setouchi region prefectures and its local dialect, plus one "Setouchi version" in the Theater edition. "Setouchi no Koe" was included in all editions and has previously been included in the AKB48 single "Negaigoto no Mochigusare", released on May 31, 2017.

== Reception ==
"Kurayami" sold around 152,000 copies in its release week according to Billboard Japan, and placed first in both the Oricon Singles and Billboard Japan Hot 100 charts. It won the Shikoku Block Award at the 2019 CD Shop Awards.

== Track listing ==
=== CD ===
1. "Kurayami" (暗闇)
2. "Setouchi no Koe" (瀬戸内の声)
3. Different tracks on each type:
  - Type A: "STU48 (Hyogo ver.)" (STU48 兵庫ver.)
  - Type B: "STU48 (Okayama ver.)" (STU48 岡山ver.)
  - Type C: "STU48 (Hiroshima ver.)" (STU48 広島ver.)
  - Type D: "STU48 (Yamaguchi ver.)" (STU48 山口ver.)
  - Type E: "STU48 (Tokushima ver.)" (STU48 徳島ver.)
  - Type F: "STU48 (Kagawa ver.)" (STU48 香川ver.)
  - Type G: "STU48 (Ehime ver.)" (STU48 愛媛ver.)
  - Theater: "STU48 (Setouchi ver.)" (STU48 瀬戸内ver.)
4. Different tracks on each type:
  - Type A, Type B: "Hi Zenryoku" (非全力)
  - Type C, Type D: "Kataomoi no Iriguchi" (片想いの入り口)
  - Type E, Type F: "Bokutachi wa Sinbad da" (僕たちはシンドバッドだ)
  - Type G, Theater: "Dareka ga Itsuka Suki da to Itte Kureru Hi Made" (誰かがいつか 好きだと言ってくれる日まで)
5. "Kurayami" (instrumental)
6. "Setouchi no Koe" (instrumental)
7. Instrumental version of track 3
8. Instrumental version of track 4

=== DVD ===
1. Kurayami Music Video
2. Setouchi no Koe Music Video
3. Different on each type:
  - Type-A: STU48 Setouchi 7 Prefecture Tour ~ Hajimemashite, STU48 desu. Renzoku Chouhen Live Documentary Series Vol. 5 Hyogo
  - Type-B: STU48 Setouchi 7 Prefecture Tour ~ Hajimemashite, STU48 desu. Renzoku Chouhen Live Documentary Series Vol. 2 Okayama
  - Type-C: STU48 Setouchi 7 Prefecture Tour ~ Hajimemashite, STU48 desu. Renzoku Chouhen Live Documentary Series Vol. 7 Hiroshima
  - Type-D: STU48 Setouchi 7 Prefecture Tour ~ Hajimemashite, STU48 desu. Renzoku Chouhen Live Documentary Series Vol. 6 Yamaguchi
  - Type-E: STU48 Setouchi 7 Prefecture Tour ~ Hajimemashite, STU48 desu. Renzoku Chouhen Live Documentary Series Vol. 1 Tokushima
  - Type-F: STU48 Setouchi 7 Prefecture Tour ~ Hajimemashite, STU48 desu. Renzoku Chouhen Live Documentary Series Vol. 4 Kagawa
  - Type-G: STU48 Setouchi 7 Prefecture Tour ~ Hajimemashite, STU48 desu. Renzoku Chouhen Live Documentary Series Vol. 3 Ehime

== Personnel ==
=== "Kurayami" ===
Center: Yumiko Takino

- 1st row: Yumiko Takino
- 2nd row: Hina Iwata, Nana Okada, Yuri Torobu
- 3rd row: Mitsuki Imamura, Ayumi Ichioka, Haruka Sano, Fū Yabushita, Kanon Isogai
- 4th row: Akari Fukuda, Kaho Mori, Minami Ishida, Chiho Ishida, Azusa Fujiwara, Miyuna Kadowaki, Kōko Tanaka

=== "Setouchi no Koe" ===
Center: Yumiko Takino

Kanon Isogai, Ayumi Ichioka, Hina Iwata, Nana Okada, Mami Ozaki, Momona Kadota, Rino Sashihara, Yumiko Takino, Mahina Taniguchi, Orie Cho, Yuri Torobu, Akari Fukuda, Azusa Fujiwara, Haruka Mishima, Kaho Mori, Fū Yabushita

=== "STU48" ===
Chiho Ishida, Minami Ishida, Kanon Isogai, Ayumi Ichioka, Mitsuki Imamura, Hina Iwata, Nana Okada, Marina Ōtani, Mami Ozaki, Kokoa Kai, Momona Kadota, Miyuna Kadowaki, Miyu Sakaki, Haruka Sano, Hinako Shioi, Nonoka Shintani, Saki Sugahara, Yumiko Takino, Kōko Tanaka, Mahina Taniguchi, Orie Cho, Yuri Torobu, Aoi Hyōdo, Akari Fukuda, Azusa Fujiwara, Haruka Mishima, Arisa Mineyoshi, Kaho Mori, Maiha Morishita, Honoka Yano, Fū Yabushita

=== "Hi Zenryoku" ===
Center: Miyuna Kadowaki

Chiho Ishida, Marina Ōtani, Miyuna Kadowaki, Miyu Sakaki, Orie Cho, Aoi Hyōdo, Haruka Mishima

=== "Kataomoi no Iriguchi" ===
Center: Ayumi Ichioka, Hina Iwata

Ayumi Ichioka, Hina Iwata, Nonoka Shintani, Arisa Mineyoshi

=== "Bokutachi wa Sinbad da" ===
Center: Yuri Torobu

Minami Ishida, Momona Kadota, Haruka Sano, Kōko Tanaka, Yuri Torobu, Akari Fukuda, Azusa Fujiwara, Kaho Mori, Honoka Yano

=== "Dareka ga Itsuka Suki da to Itte Kureru Hi Made" ===
Center: Yumiko Takino

Kanon Isogai, Mitsuki Imamura, Nana Okada, Yumiko Takino, Fū Yabushita
