= Iki o Suru Kokoro =

- Theater edition cover

Single by STU48
- Language: Japanese
- English title: Breathing Heart
- B-side: "Shizentōta Shugi" (Note: 自然淘汰主義; lit. 'Law of Natural Selection') (Type-A); "Egao no Chance" (Note: 笑顔のチャンス; lit. 'Chance for Smile') (Type-B); "Kamisama mo Akireru Kurai ni" (Note: 神様も呆れるくらいに; lit. 'Even God Would be Astonished') (Theater); "Hana wa Dare no Mono?" − The First Take version
- Released: March 15, 2023
- Genre: J-pop
- Label: King Records
- Lyricist: Yasushi Akimoto
- Producer: Yasushi Akimoto

STU48 singles chronology
"Hana wa Dare no Mono?" (2022)	"Iki o Suru Kokoro" (2023)	"Kimi wa Nani wo Kokai Suru no ka?" (2023)

Music video
- "Iki o Suru Kokoro" on YouTube
- "Iki o Suru Kokoro" (dance QR version) on YouTube
- "Kamisama mo Akireru Kurai ni" on YouTube
- "Egao no Chance" on YouTube
- "Hana wa Dare no Mono?" − The First Take version on YouTube

"Iki o Suru Kokoro" (Japanese: 息をする心; lit. 'Breathing Heart') is the ninth single by Japanese idol group STU48. It was released on March 15, 2023, with Chiho Ishida as lead performer.

== Production and release ==
On December 24, 2022, during their Christmas concert at the Hiroshima Bunka Gakuen Hall, STU48 announced that their ninth single would be released on March 1, 2023, with Chiho Ishida as center (lead performer). However, the release was later postponed for two weeks due to "production reasons".

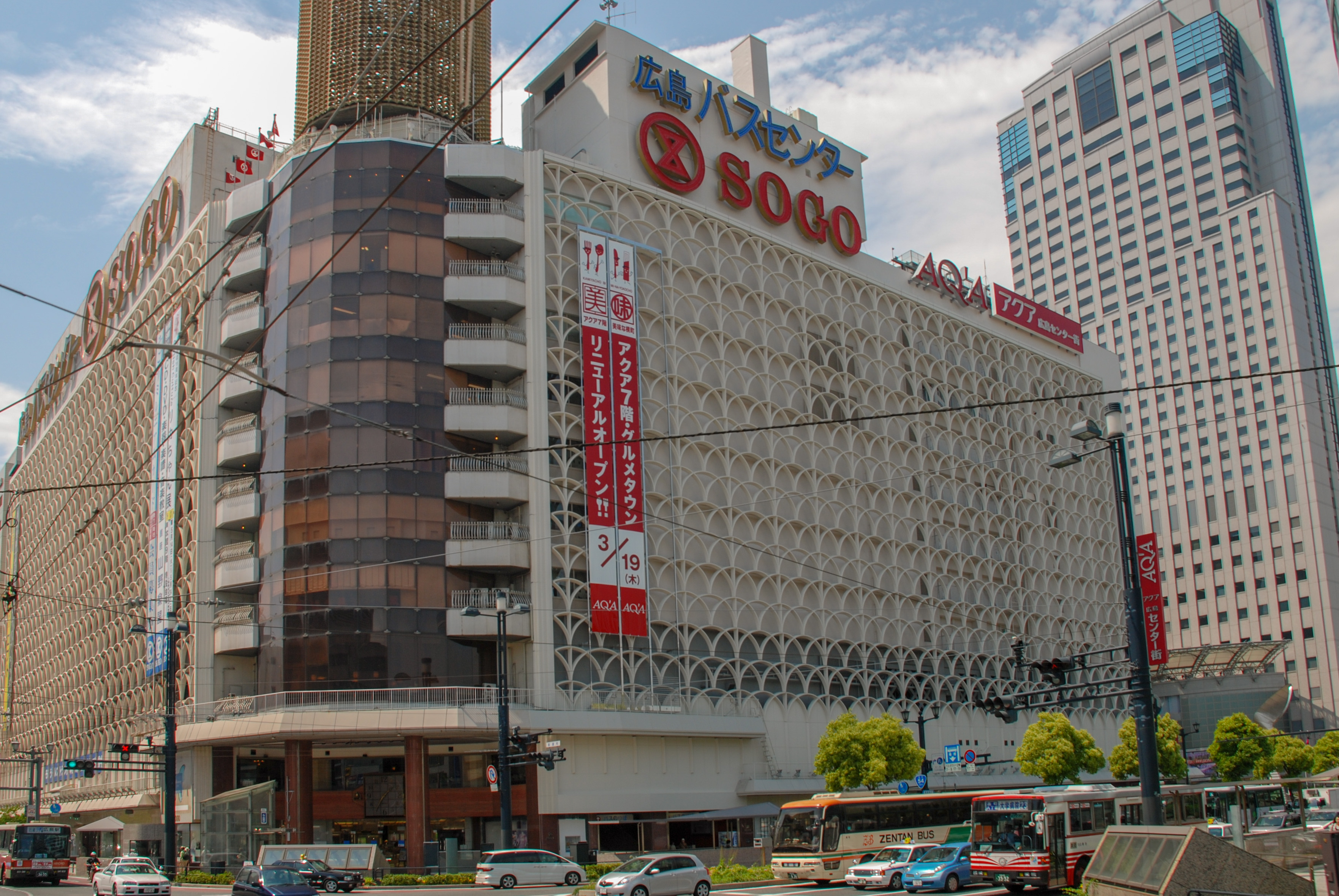
The Sogo department store building in Hiroshima is prominently visible in the dance QR video

The music video for the title song, released on March 1, 2023, features multiple storylines about characters facing problems that make them feel like they "cannot breathe", befitting the song title. The chorus is performed on a stage on the rooftop of the Gojinsha Hiroshima Kamiya-cho Building in downtown Hiroshima and features QR codes on the stage and the hands of each performer, which provide access to group and individual members' bonus short videos. An alternate "dance QR" video was released on March 13, which depicts the complete choreography and displays the QR codes more prominently for easier scanning.

The music video for "Egao no Chance" depicts a meeting in the "S7 summit", a reference to the 49th G7 summit which would be held in Hiroshima that year. It was performed by members of the Setouchi PR Club Season 2 subunit, who were elected by fans using ballots included in the previous single.

The single was released in five editions, which are the Special and regular editions of Types A and B and a Theater edition. All editions included Ishida's solo performance of "Hana wa Dare no Mono?" from the YouTube channel The First Take, which is the first performance by an AKB48 Group member on that channel.

== Reception ==
"Iki o Suru Kokoro" sold 217 thousand copies in its release week according to Oricon and placed second on both the Oricon Singles and Billboard Japan Hot 100 charts.

== Track listing ==
=== CD ===
1. "Iki o Suru Kokoro" (息をする心) / Senbatsu
2. Different track on each edition:
  - Type-A: "Shizentōta Shugi" (自然淘汰主義)
  - Type-B: "Egao no Chance" (笑顔のチャンス), by Setouchi PR Unit Season 2
  - Theater: "Kamisama mo Akireru Kurai ni" (神様も呆れるくらいに), by SHOWROOM Senbatsu
3. "Hana wa Dare no Mono?" - The First Take version (花は誰のもの? - From THE FIRST TAKE)
4. "Iki o Suru Kokoro" (off-vocal)
5. Different off-vocal track on each edition:
  - Type-A: "Shizentōta Shugi"
  - Type-B: "Egao no Chance"
  - Theater: "Kamisama mo Akireru Kurai ni"

=== DVD ===
- Type-A: "Iki o Suru Kokoro" Music Video
- Type-B: "Egao no Chance" Music Video

=== Special Edition (streaming services) ===
1. "Iki o Suru Kokoro"
2. "Shizentōta Shugi"
3. "Egao no Chance"
4. "Kamisama mo Akireru Kurai ni"

== Personnel ==
=== "Iki o Suru Kokoro" ===
Chiho Ishida (lead), Minami Ishida, Mitsuki Imamura, Hina Iwata, Kokoa Kai, Yumiko Takino, Akari Fukuda, Yuka Oki, Mai Nakamura, Serika Osaki, Anna Kawamata, Aiko Kojima, Sayaka Takao, Rinko Yoshizaki, Sara Yoshida, Momoka Rissen

=== "Shizentōta Shugi" ===
Mahina Taniguchi, Aoi Hyodo, Arisa Mineyoshi, Rika Muneyuki, Maiha Morishita, Soraha Shinano (lead), Yura Ikeda, Rine Utsumi, Yuna Kawamata, Riko Kudo, Himeka Sako, Sara Shimizu, Ayaka Suzuki, Miho Tanaka, Sayaka Harada, Natsuki Watanabe, Azumi Okada, Rio Okamura, Yuka Kurushima, Noa Morokuzu

=== "Egao no Chance" ===
Members of Setouchi PR Unit Season 2:

Chiho Ishida (lead), Akari Fukuda, Yuka Oki, Mai Nakamura, Serika Osaki, Sayaka Takao, Rinko Yoshizaki

=== "Hana wa Dare no Mono? - From The First Take" ===
Chiho Ishida

=== "Kamisama mo Akireru Kurai ni" ===
Mitsuki Imamura, Kokoa Kai, Yumiko Takino (lead), Akari Fukuda, Sayaka Takao
