= Yumiko Takino =

Japanese tarento, former member of STU48

- 瀧野 由美子
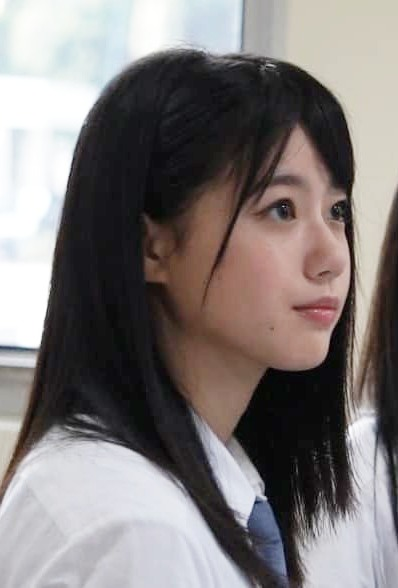
- Yumiko Takino in 2019
- Born: 24 September 1997 (age 28); Yamaguchi Prefecture, Japan
- Occupations: Tarento; model; television presenter; actress Idol singer (formerly)
- Years active: 2017–present
- Notable work: "Setouchi no Koe"
- Height: 164 cm (5 ft 5 in)
- Musical career
- Also known as: Yumirin (ゆみりん)
- Instruments: Vocals, saxophone
- Years active: 2017–2023
- Formerly of: STU48
- Website: https://takinoyumiko.com/

Yumiko Takino (Japanese: 瀧野 由美子, Hepburn: Takino Yumiko; born 24 September 1997) is a Japanese tarento, model, presenter, actress and former idol singer. She was a member of STU48 and the lead performer for the title songs in the group's first five singles, and is also known for her saxophone playing.

== Biography ==
Takino had wanted to become an idol since she was a primary school student, but did not actively pursue that dream until she found out about STU48 since it would not be realistic to become an idol in rural areas. She moved from Yamaguchi to Hiroshima in 2016 to attend university and took the audition for STU48 in Hiroshima. On March 19, 2017, Takino passed the STU48 final audition and was accepted into the group. In a post-acceptance interview, she said that she wanted "to be in a group that makes many people feel the goodness of Setouchi."

In April, Takino was included as one of 100 members most discussed in social media in the AKB48 General Election Official Guidebook 2017, published by Kodansha. She also graced the cover of Weekly Shōnen Magazine released on May 31, becoming the fastest member to appear on a manga magazine cover among the AKB48 Group, Nogizaka46, and Keyakizaka46, 73 days after passing the audition.

Takino made her debut performance with STU48 on May 3 at the Hiroshima Peace Memorial Park, as part of the 2017 Hiroshima Flower Festival. She served as center (lead performer) for STU48's first original song "Setouchi no Koe", first performed at the Okayama Mirai Hall on June 3 and released as part of AKB48's 48th single, "Negaigoto no Mochigusare". She was also the center for the title song of STU48's debut single "Kurayami", released on January 31, 2018.

In August, Takino made her runway debut at the Kansai Collection 2017 Autumn/Winter fashion show in Osaka, appearing with other AKB48 Group members. She also appeared at the GirlsAward fashion show in September 2018, modeling for Bershka, and the TGC Kitakyushu in October 2019.

In June 2018, Takino ranked #74 in the AKB48 Senbatsu Sousenkyo, being one of only two STU48 original members to rank in along with Chiho Ishida at #99 (Nana Okada, who ranked fifth, is concurrently an AKB48 member). Both of them also took part in AKB48's performance of "Sustainable" at the 70th NHK Kōhaku Uta Gassen on December 31, 2019.

Takino made her television series debut as the character Manji in the television drama Majimuri Gakuen, which was aired from July to September 2018 on Nippon TV. As a railway enthusiast, she hosted her first self-titled variety show about the Shinkansen, STU48 Takino Yumiko no Koisuru Seishun 48 Kippu, (Note: 瀧野由美子の恋する青春48きっぷ ("STU48 Yumiko Takino's Love Youth 48 Ticket"), similar to both the AKB48 song "Koi Suru Fortune Cookie" and the Seishun 18 Ticket) which has released two episodes in October 2018 and October 2019 on TV Asahi CS satellite channel. In January 2021, she started as regular reporter for the Yamaguchi Broadcasting local information show Nekketsu TV.

On March 28, 2020, during STU48's third anniversary celebration, AKB48 Group General Manager Mion Mukaichi announced that Takino has signed with the Mama&Son talent agency. The agency also represents Mukaichi herself and several former AKB48 members.

In June, Takino started her studies for university entrance in collaboration with the online yobikō Tadayobi and parts of her tutoring sessions have been published on YouTube. She was a university student when she joined STU48, but dropped out after her fourth semester to focus on her work activities. In spring of 2022, she passed multiple university exams and enrolled in an undisclosed "prestigious" women's university.

Takino's first photobook was released on September 22, 2021, published by Kodansha. Titled Kimi no Koto o Mada Yoku Shiranai, (Note: 君のことをまだよく知らない ("I Don't Know You Well Yet")) the photography took place on Ishigaki Island and her home prefecture of Yamaguchi, including the Akiyoshidai Quasi-National Park and her actual family residence. The book sold an estimated 9000 copies in its first week and placed third on the Oricon weekly photobook chart. Real Sound reported in June 2022 that the photobook was sold out in several online stores following an "unexpected" viewership spike in a recent Showroom live streaming session, and several reprints have been ordered since then.

Takino was featured in an episode of the German documentary series Länder – Menschen – Abenteuer on NDR Fernsehen about the San'yō Shinkansen, aired in June 2022.

On July 29, 2023, during the first day of STU48 Zenkoku Tour 2023, Takino announced her graduation from STU48. Her graduation concert was on November 3 of the same year at the Hiroshima Green Arena.

On August 1, 2023, she announced that her contract with Mama&Son has been terminated the day before. She states that she will continue her entertainment activities even after graduation from STU48.

On November 1, 2023, Takino's official fanclub was opened. She officially graduated from STU48 on November 30, 2023. She aims to become an actress after graduation.

Takino's second photobook, titled Mindscape, was released on January 11, 2024, and sold 4000 copies in its first week, placing it first on the Oricon weekly photobook chart.

On May 18, 2024, she will make her solo acting debut in the stage play adaptation of the 2016 film Her Love Boils Bathwater.

== Personal life ==
Takino first became interested in the saxophone during elementary school and played the alto saxophone in the brass bands of her middle and high school. She studied the saxophone at university and has performed with the Elisabeth University of Music ensemble. STU48 theater manager Manabu Yamamoto remarked that her saxophone skills are "clearly at a professional level," and that she is "a member who will increase the expectation for future activities".

Takino has an older sister and a younger brother. They own a pet dog named Anko, who appeared in her 2021 photobook. She is a railfan since childhood and collects N gauge railway models with her family. She loves the Shinkansen Iron character and recommends Setouchi visitors to ride the steam train SL Yamaguchi.

Takino is a supporter of Hiroshima Toyo Carp. Prior to becoming an idol, she has worked part-time as beer vendor at the club's home Mazda Stadium and consistently placed in the top three in sales. In 2018, she threw out a ceremonial first pitch at the same stadium as representative of STU48.

== Discography ==
Takino has performed in all STU48 title songs, and has been the center (lead performer) or co-center in all of them except "Hitorigoto de Kataru Kurainara" (2021). She also represented STU48 in AKB48's single title songs from "11gatsu no Anklet" (2017) to "Shitsuren, Arigatō" (2020, the last AKB48 title song to feature representatives from all sister groups), except for "Sentimental Train" (2018), which lineup was determined by election. Other notable appearances include:

- "Setouchi no Koe" (AKB48 single "Negaigoto no Mochigusare" B-side, 2017), first STU48 music release
- "Hitonatsu no Dekigoto" ("Sentimental Train" B-side, 2018), performed by the Upcoming Girls (ranks 65-80) of the 10th AKB48 Group general election
- "Yuri wo Sakaseru ka?" ("Sentimental Train" B-side, 2018), Majimuri Gakuen theme song
- "Hatsukoi Door" (AKB48 single "Jiwaru Days" B-side, 2019), performed with Sakamichi AKB, a collaboration between AKB48 Group and Sakamichi Series

== Appearances ==
=== Television ===
- AKBingo! (Nippon TV, 2018–2019), irregular appearances
- Setobingo! (Nippon TV, 2018), regular cast
- STU48 Takino Yumiko no Koisuru Seishun 48 Kippu (STU48瀧野由美子の恋する青春48きっぷ) (TV Asahi CS, 2018), co-host
- Majimuri Gakuen (Nippon TV, 2018), as Manji
- STU48 Furusato Senden LABO (STU48 ふるさと宣伝LABO; "STU48 Hometown Promotion Lab"), chapter 2 (Yamaguchi Broadcasting, October 2019)
- Nekketsu TV (Yamaguchi Broadcasting, 2021–2023), regular reporter
- Länder – Menschen – Abenteuer (NDR Fernsehen, 2022)

== Bibliography ==
Title	Release date	Publisher	ISBN
Kimi no Koto o Mada Yoku Shiranai (Note: 君のことをまだよく知らない ("I Don't Know You Well Yet"))	September 22, 2021	Kodansha	ISBN 978-4065257029
Mindscape	January 11, 2024	Wani Books	
