= Chiho Ishida =

Japanese tarento (born 2002)

- 石田千穂
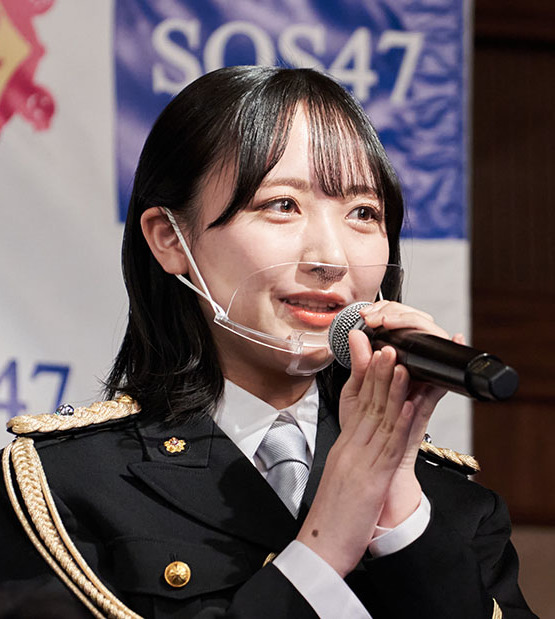
- Chiho Ishida in 2021, as a National Police Agency ambassador
- Born: March 17, 2002 (age 24); Hiroshima Prefecture, Japan
- Occupation: Tarento
- Years active: 2012–present
- Musical career
- Genre: J-pop
- Years active: 2012–2026
- Formerly of: peony; MAX♡GIRLS; STU48

Chiho Ishida (石田千穂, Ishida Chiho; born March 17, 2002) is a Japanese tarento. She is a member candidate for the girl group ≠Me and was a member of the girl group STU48. She was the first STU48 member to hold a solo concert and release a photo book, and was thrice the lead performer for the group's singles.

== Biography ==
=== 2012–2016: Actor's School Hiroshima ===
Ishida has worked as a model since childhood. In 2012, she was admitted as a 26th generation student of Actor's School Hiroshima. While a student, she became a member of the idol groups peony and MAX♡GIRLS managed by the school. That year, she also won the Grand Prix in the Fairies NEXT auditions, organized by Rising Production to form a junior unit to the girl group Fairies, but the unit never debuted.

=== 2017–2019: STU48, AKB48 Group, overseas work ===
On March 19, 2017, Ishida passed the audition for STU48's first generation and graduated from ASH the next day. She later became the leader of STU48's travel and beauty subunit Charming Trip, formed in October 2018. Although she is not an exclusive model, she has been featured on several beauty columns and booklets and aims to introduce STU48 to more female fans through beauty activities.

In June 2018, Ishida ranked #99 in the AKB48 Senbatsu Sousenkyo, being one of only two STU48 original members to rank in, the other being Yumiko Takino at #74 (Nana Okada, who ranked fifth, is concurrently an AKB48 member). In 2019, Ishida became a member of the subunit Sucheese, which consisted of the "next generation leaders" of AKB48 and its five Japanese sister groups, and their song "Okujō Kara Sakebu" was included in AKB48's 55th single, "Jiwaru Days". Ishida and Takino also represented STU48 in the lineup for the title song of AKB48's 56th single, "Sustainable", and performed with them at the 70th NHK Kōhaku Uta Gassen on December 31.

In October 2019, Yamaguchi Broadcasting aired the television program STU48 Furusato Senden LABO (STU48 ふるさと宣伝LABO; "STU48 Hometown Promotion Lab"), which featured Ishida and Takino's visit to Indonesia as Setouchi Region tourism ambassadors.

=== 2020: Solo activities, joining Twin Planet ===
On January 24, 2020, Ishida held her first solo concert at Tokyo Dome City Hall. A total of 29 songs were performed, and Ishida read a letter to her fans in the end announcing her goal of becoming the "strongest idol".

In March, Ishida's first self-titled web series, STU48 Ishida Chiho no Hataraku Ishida Chiho (STU48石田千穂のはたらく石田千穂; STU48 Chiho Ishida's Chiho Ishida at Work), was launched on Hulu Japan. It features Ishida and several other STU48 members trying their hands at various part-time jobs and ran for four episodes.

On July 7, 2020, Ishida announced during a solo performance at the STU48 Theater that she has signed to Wild Planet, a section for actors and actresses within the agency Twin Planet, with the intention to pursue acting in addition to her current activities. SKE48 member Akari Suda, who is signed to the same agency, offered her congratulations in a recorded video message.

On October 26, Ishida announced that her photobook, titled Lemon no Kisetsu (檸檬の季節; "Lemon Season"), would be released on December 2. With a theme of "past and present", the "past" section was photographed in Hiroshima Prefecture, where she grew up, and the "present" in Okinawa Prefecture. it would be both the first solo photobook and the first swimsuit photoshoot by an STU48 original member. The book placed fifth in the Oricon photobook sales ranking for the week of its release, with approximately 4,266 copies sold.

Ishida was known to perform live streaming on the SHOWROOM platform every day. As of August 2020, she had reached 1200 consecutive days of live streaming.

=== 2021–2026: STU48 center, stage acting ===
Ishida became title song center (lead performer) for the first time in STU48's sixth single, "Hitorigoto de Kataru Kurainara" (2021). She was also elected into the group's fan-voted Setouchi PR Unit, which would perform the song "Boku wa Kono Umi o Nagameteru" (僕はこの海を眺めてる; "I'm Looking at This Sea") included in the single. She became a title song center again for "Hana wa Dare no Mono?" (2022), in which the center position would be rotated for each performance between her and fellow members Yumiko Takino and Mai Nakamura in a novel "triangle center" system. She was also elected as the leader of the second iteration, or "Season 2", of the Setouchi PR Unit.

In December 2021, Ishida represented STU48 in a National Police Agency campaign to combat phone fraud.

Ishida made her acting debut in July 2022 in a stage adaptation of the novel Parade by Shuichi Yoshida. She went on to portray Shuna in the stage adaptations of the That Time I Got Reincarnated as a Slime for three installments in 2024 and 2026, as well as scientist Rakshata Chawla in Code Geass: Lelouch of the Rebellion Musical in 2026.

On November 23, 2022, Ishida became the first AKB48 Group member to appear on the YouTube channel The First Take with a solo performance of "Hana wa Dare no Mono?".

Ishida's second photobook, titled Taiyō tte Nani Iro? (太陽って何色?; lit. 'What Color is the Sun?'), was published by Akita Shoten on October 25, 2024. With a theme of "growth", it was photographed in Taiwan.

=== 2026–present: Departure from STU48, ≠Me candidacy ===
On February 10, 2026, Ishida announced that she would leave STU48. To commemorate her departure, her third photobook, titled Tenshoku (天職; lit. 'Calling') and photographed in Singapore, was published by Shueisha on April 22; a digital edition with extra photos titled Tenshoku: Another was published on the Weekly Playboy website on July 20. Her "graduation" concert was held at the Kanadevia Hall (formerly Tokyo Dome City Hall) in Tokyo on May 31, where she had held her first solo concert in 2020 and the same day as boy group Arashi's farewell concert at the nearby Tokyo Dome. Several former fellow STU48 founding members performed on stage with her, including founding captain Nana Okada. She officially left the group following one last performance at the Hiroshima Prefectural Cultural Center on June 7.

On September 13, Ishida announced that she had parted ways with Twin Planet on July 25. The next day, she was revealed as a new member candidate for the girl group ≠Me, produced by fellow former STU48 member Rino Sashihara, alongside several other former AKB48 Group members.

== Reception ==
In 2015, About ASH described Ishida as the "sleeping talent" of Actor's School Hiroshima, referring to her passing the Fairies NEXT audition not long after joining the school.

In 2020, Tokyo Sports mentioned that Ishida's appeal lies in the contrast between her "innocent" looks and her "unexpected" variety of skills, including dancing. She is also described as a genuine classic idol, in a time when idols tend to aim for a more modern "cool" image, with the potential to surpass Mayu Watanabe. Meanwhile, Encount and Entame Next similarly praised her perseverance and strong relationship with fans.

== Personal life ==
Ishida's family home is in Kumano, which she described as a "mountainous" area some distance from Hiroshima city. She has an older brother. Her family has always been supportive of her entertainment career, and it was her father who recommended that she audition for STU48.

Ishida's role model is Yuki Kashiwagi.

== Discography ==
Ishida has performed in all STU48 title songs and has been the center (lead performer) of "Hitorigoto de Kataru Kurainara" (2021) and "Iki o Suru Kokoro" (2023), as well as co-center in "Hana wa Dare no Mono?" (2022). Other notable appearances include:

- "Setouchi no Koe" (AKB48 single "Negaigoto no Mochigusare" B-side, 2017), first STU48 music release
- "Nami ga Tsutaeru Mono"" (AKB48 single "Sentimental Train" B-side, 2018), performed by the "10th World General Election Commemorative Group" (ranks 81-100) of the 10th AKB48 Group general election
- "'Suki' no Tane" (AKB48 single "Sentimental Train" B-side, 2018), performed by the top 16 participants of the 2018 Showroom Appeal Event (online side contest of the 10th AKB48 Group general election)
- "Koi wa Kebyo chu" ("Daisuki na Hito", 2019), first time as center, first Charming Trip music release
- "Okujo Kara Sakebu" (AKB48 single "Jiwaru Days" B-side, 2019), performed with Sucheese
- "Sustainable" (2019), first AKB48 title song participation
- "Omoide My Friend" ("Shitsuren, Arigatō", 2020), performed with 1st Campus, AKB48 Group selected young members unit

== Bibliography ==
Title	Release date	Publisher	ISBN
Lemon no Kisetsu (檸檬の季節; "Lemon Season", photobook)	December 2, 2020	Kodansha	ISBN 978-4065217849
Taiyō tte Nani Iro? (太陽って何色?; lit. 'What Color is the Sun?', photobook)	October 25, 2024	Akita Shoten	ISBN 4253011276
Tenshoku (天職; lit. 'Calling', photobook)	April 22, 2026	Shueisha	ISBN 4087902404

== Appearances ==
=== Television ===
- AKBingo! (Nippon TV, 2018–2019), irregular appearances
- Setobingo! (Nippon TV, 2018)
- STU48 Furusato Senden LABO (STU48 ふるさと宣伝LABO; "STU48 Hometown Promotion LABO"), chapter 2 (Yamaguchi Broadcasting, October 2019)
- STU48 Ishida Chiho no Hataraku Ishida Chiho (STU48石田千穂のはたらく石田千穂; STU48 Chiho Ishida's Chiho Ishida at Work) (Hulu Japan, 2020)

=== Concert ===
- STU48 Ishida Chiho Solokonsāto ~Ie-! ni kaeru made ga Chihokon desu~ (STU48 石田千穂ソロコンサート～いえっ！に帰るまでがちほコンです。～; "STU48 Chiho Ishida Solo Concert ~It's ChihoCon until We Go Home with a 'Yay!'~") (Tokyo Dome City Hall, January 24, 2020)

=== Stage plays ===
- Parade (2022), Kotomi Ogakiuchi
- That Time I Got Reincarnated as a Slime (2024), Shuna
- That Time I Got Reincarnated as a Slime Stage 2: Demon Lord Attack Arc & Human-Monster Interaction Arc (2024), Shuna
- Code Geass: Lelouch of the Rebellion Musical (2026), Rakshata Chawla
- That Time I Got Reincarnated as a Slime Stage 3: Demon Lord's Awakening & Octagram Soars Arc (2026), Shuna
