= Hitorigoto de Kataru Kurainara =

- Theater edition cover, featuring Chiho Ishida

Single by STU48
- B-side: "Sunglasses Days" (Type A); "Boku wa Kono Umi o Nagameteru" (Type B); "Soshite Boku wa Boku Janaku Naru" (Theater)
- Released: February 17, 2021
- Genre: J-pop
- Label: King Records
- Lyricist: Yasushi Akimoto
- Producer: Yasushi Akimoto

STU48 singles chronology
"Omoidaseru Koi o Shiyō" (2020)	"Hitorigoto de Kataru Kurainara" (2021)	"Hetaretachi yo" (2021)

Music video
- "Hitorigoto de Kataru Kurainara" on YouTube
- "Boku wa Kono Umi o Nagameteru" on YouTube

"Hitorigoto de Kataru Kurainara" (Japanese: 独り言で語るくらいなら; lit. 'Rather Than Talking to Myself') is the sixth single by Japanese idol group STU48, released on February 17, 2021. The title song features Chiho Ishida in her first lead performer role.

== Production and release ==
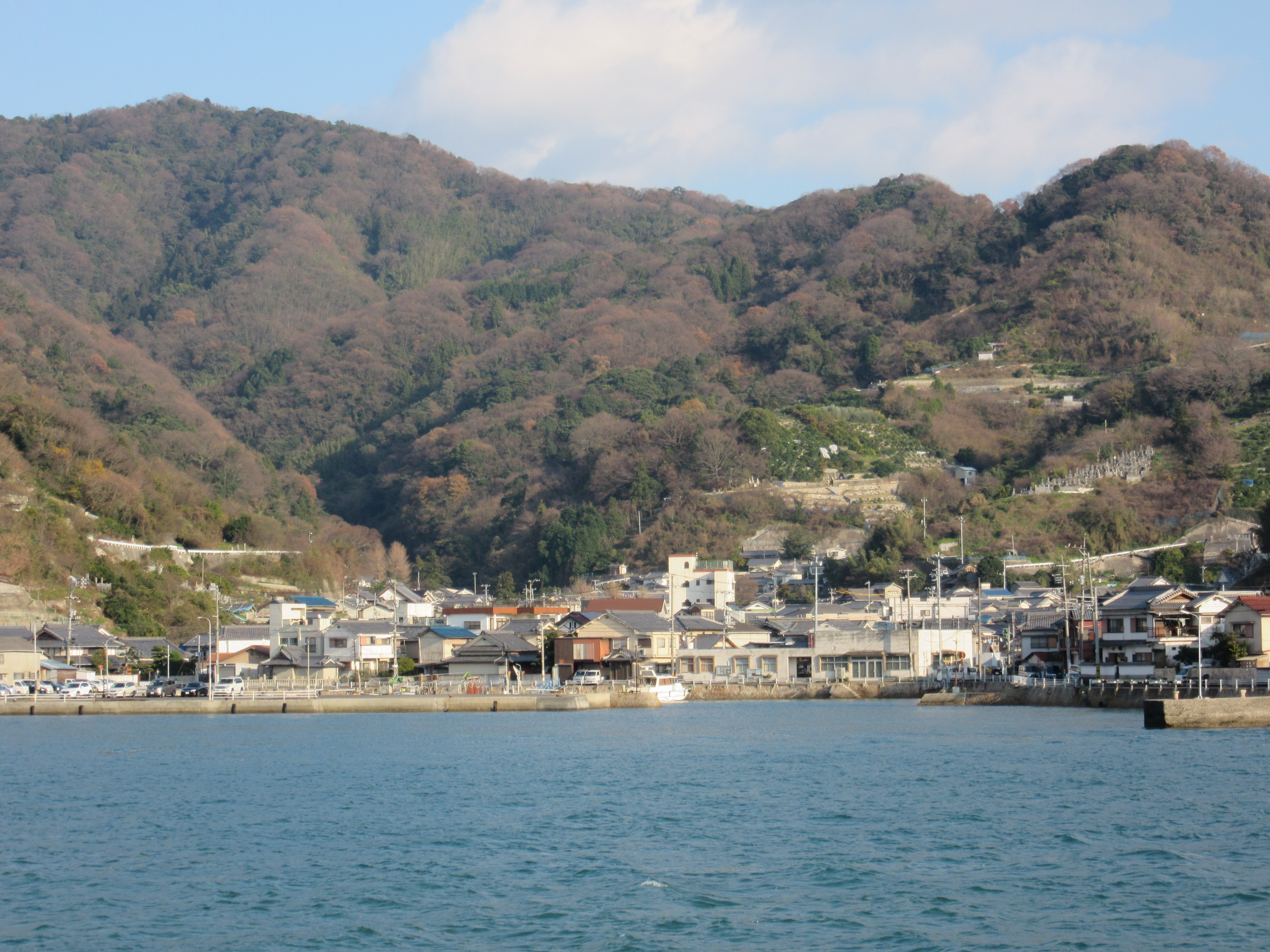
Kamikamagari Island

The single was announced on January 15, 2021, during STU48's first Nippon Budokan concert, followed by the first live performance of the title song. The song uses quadruple meter except for the chorus, during which it switches to triple meter. The music video is the first one from STU48 to heavily utilize computer graphics along with outdoor scenes filmed on Kamikamagari Island in Kure, Hiroshima, in contrast to the group's usual full location shootings at Setouchi region points of interest, due to the COVID-19 pandemic. The choreography was created by Tomohiko Tsujimoto, who has choreographed several STU48 songs and envisioned a fantasy-like atmosphere for this music video, in which the performers meet their "alternate selves".

"Hitorigoto de Kataru Kurainara" became the theme song for the 2021 animated short film Santa Company: Midsummer Merry Christmas (サンタ・カンパニー 〜真夏のメリークリスマス〜, Santa Kanpanī ~Manatsu no Merī Kurisumasu~), which was part of a Nippon Foundation campaign to raise awareness about marine debris. Members Marina Otani and Miyuna Kadowaki also served as voice actresses.

The B-side song "Soshite Boku wa Boku Janaku Naru" (そして僕は僕じゃなくはる; lit. 'And I'm No Longer Me') was performed by the six members who appeared on the final stages of the third AKB48 Group No. 1 Singing Ability Contest in December 2020. The Setouchi PR Unit, which members were elected using ballots included with the previous single, performed "Boku wa Kono Umi o Nagameteru" (僕はこの海を眺めてる; lit. 'I'm Looking at This Sea') led by top-voted member Miyuna Kadowaki. "Sunglasses Days" was performed by all full members (excluding trainees).

The single was released on February 17, 2021, in five versions: limited and regular editions of Types A and B and a Theater edition.

== Reception ==
"Hitorigoto de Kataru Kurainara" sold 194,000 copies in its release week according to Billboard Japan and placed second in both the Oricon Singles and Billboard Japan Hot 100 charts.

== Track listing ==
=== CD ===
1. "Hitorigoto de Kataru Kurainara" (独り言で語るくらいなら)
2. Different tracks on each type:
  - Type A: "Sunglasses Days" (サングラスデイズ)
  - Type B: "Boku wa Kono Umi o Nagameteru" (僕はこの海を眺めてる)
  - Theater: "Soshite Boku wa Boku Janaku Naru" (そして僕は僕じゃなくなる)
3. "Hitorigoto de Kataru Kurainara" (off-vocal)
4. Instrumental version of track 2

=== DVD ===
1. Different on each type:
  - Type-A: "Hitorigoto de Kataru Kurainara" Music Video
  - Type-B: "Boku wa Kono Umi wo Nagameteru" Music Video

== Personnel ==
=== "Hitorigoto de Kataru Kurainara" ===
Center: Chiho Ishida

Chiho Ishida, Minami Ishida, Mitsuki Imamura, Hina Iwata, Marina Ōtani, Nana Okada, Cocoa Kai, Miyuna Kadowaki, Yumiko Takino, Akari Fukuda, Honoka Yano, Fū Yabushita, Yuka Oki, Mai Nakamura, Sayaka Takao, Sayaka Harada

=== "Sunglasses Days" ===
Center: Mitsuki Imamura

Chiho Ishida, Minami Ishida, Mitsuki Imamura, Hina Iwata, Marina Ōtani, Cocoa Kai, Miyu Sakaki, Yumiko Takino, Mahina Taniguchi, Aoi Hyōdo, Akari Fukuda, Arisa Mineyoshi, Maiha Morishita, Honoka Yano, Fū Yabushita, Yuka Oki, Soraha Shinano, Mai Nakamura

=== "Boku wa Kono Umi wo Nagameteru" ===
Center: Miyuna Kadowaki

Chiho Ishida, Hina Iwata, Miyuna Kadowaki, Yumiko Takino, Akari Fukuda, Fū Yabushita, Yuka Oki

=== "Soshite Boku wa Boku Janaku Naru" ===
Center: Nana Okada, Yura Ikeda

Nana Okada, Mahina Taniguchi, Arisa Mineyoshi, Honoka Yano, Yura Ikeda, Aiko Kojima
