= Kobe Kokusai Hall =

Concert hall in Chūō-ku, Kobe, Japan

Kobe Kokusai Hall is a 2,112-seat concert hall located in Chūō-ku, Kobe, Japan. Notable past performers include The Beach Boys, Bon Jovi and Barry Manilow.
