= Nana Okada =

Japanese singer-songwriter and actor (born 1997)

Nana Okada 岡田 奈々
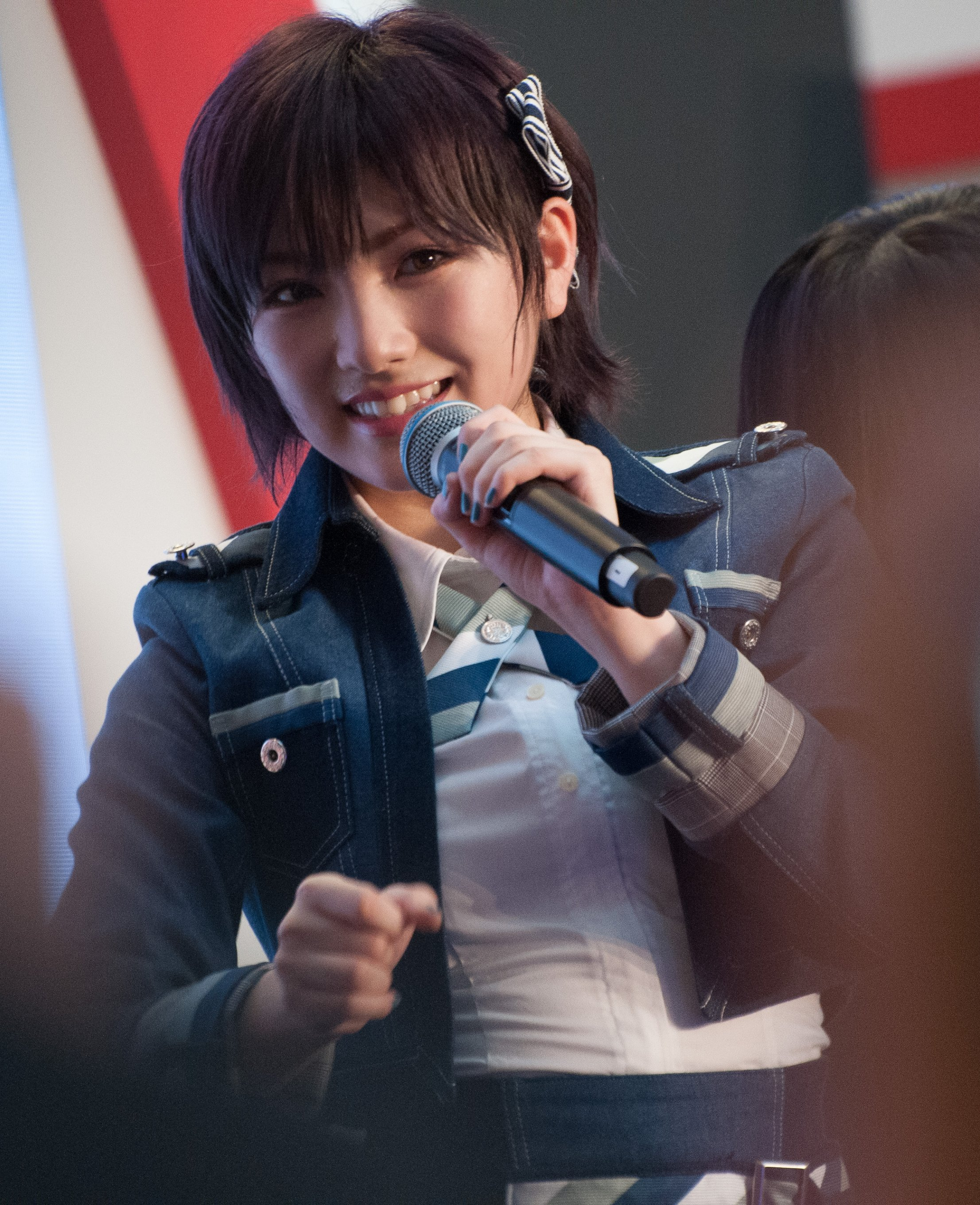
- Nana Okada in 2019

Background information
- Born: November 7, 1997 (age 29); Neyagawa, Osaka, Japan
- Origin: Kanagawa Prefecture, Japan
- Genre: J-pop
- Occupations: Singer-songwriter; actor
- Years active: 2012–present
- Label: Avex Trax
- Member of: Yunaris
- Formerly of: AKB48; STU48
- Website: Official website

YouTube information
- Channels: YuuNaaMogiOn Channel; Nana Okada's Pitfall Channel (岡田奈々の落とし穴チャンネル)
- Genres: vlog; comedy; music
- Subscribers: 132,000; 52,800
- Views: 46,432,111; 6,862,351
- Last updated: 26 July 2025

Nana Okada (岡田 奈々, Okada Nana; born November 7, 1997) is a Japanese singer-songwriter and actor. She is a former member of the girl groups AKB48 and STU48. She was a fixture on AKB48's major single lineups from 2016 to 2022 and is considered one of the best singers to have been part of the group.

Okada joined AKB48 in 2012, and since 2016 has been part of the group's main lineup, performing in all the title tracks of their singles, including twice as lead singer. From 2017 to 2022, she was concurrently a member of AKB48's fifth Japan-based sister group STU48, based in Setouchi region, and served as captain since its founding until 2020. She was a finalist in all the AKB48 Group No. 1 Singing Competitions, taking first place in the fourth event in 2022, and has released two solo songs as part of AKB48's releases. She has held solo concerts in 2018 and 2022 and a duo concert with fellow AKB48 member Yuiri Murayama in 2020. She was signed to Avex Asunaro from 2021 to 2025, and after leaving AKB48 in 2023, she has released the solo albums Asymmetry (2023), Contrust (2024), and Unformel (2025), writing all of the lyrics herself. In 2026, she reunited with Yuiri Murayama in the duo Yunaris.

As an actor, Okada has appeared in several AKB48 television series and starred in stage productions such as Majimuri Gakuen (2018), its sequel Majimuri Gakuen: Loudness (2021), and an all-female stage adaptation of Battles Without Honor and Humanity (2019). After joining Avex Asunaro, Okada has appeared in productions outside the group, such as the television series Stolen Love, High School Teacher (2021) and the stage musical adaptation of Magi: The Labyrinth of Magic (2022).

== Career ==
=== 2012–2015: Early career ===
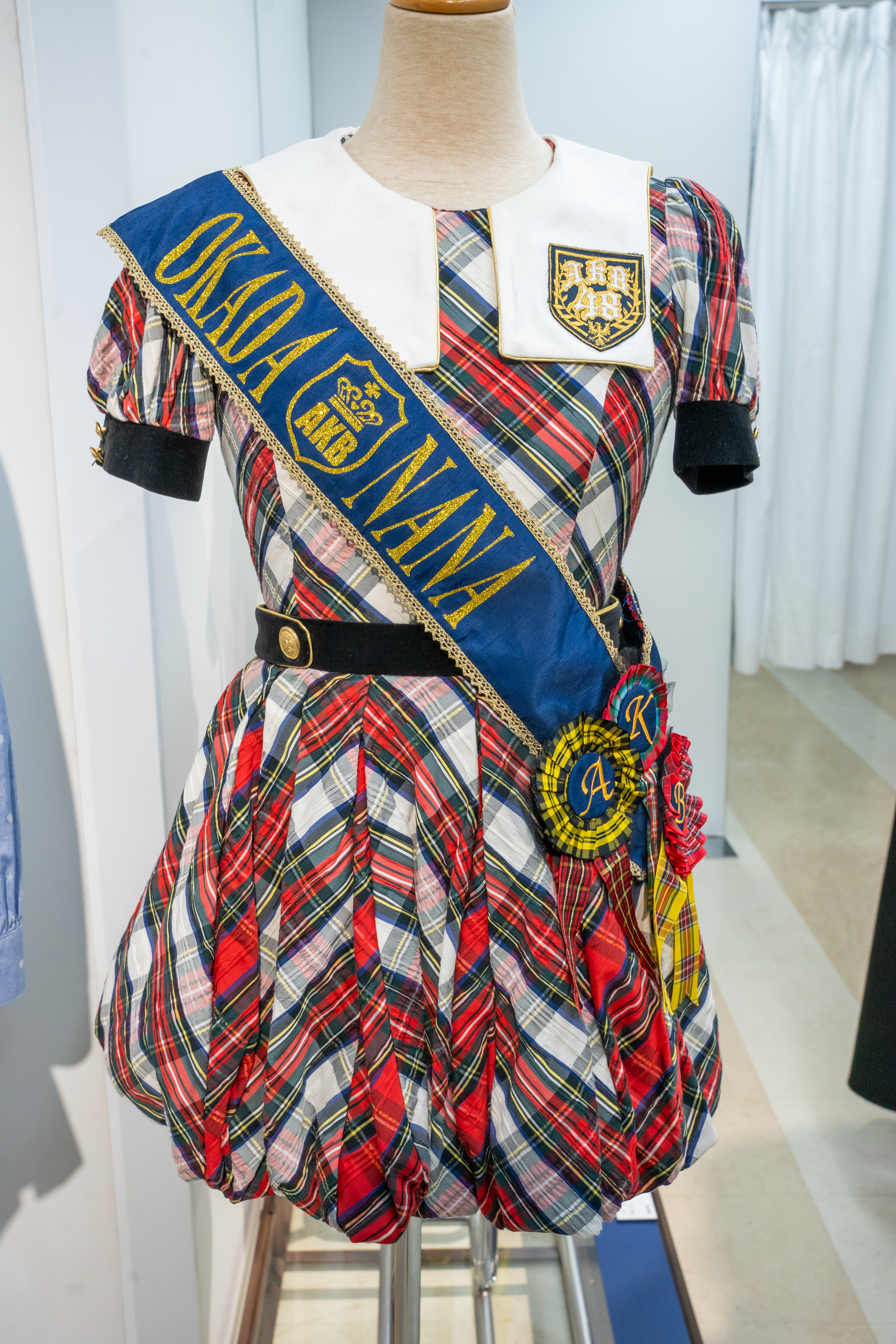
An AKB48 costume from Okada's trainee days.

Okada joined AKB48 in 2012 as part of the 14th generation trainees, after failing to pass the 13th generation audition the previous year. On March 31, 2013, the AKB48 sub-unit Tentōmu Chu! (てんとうむChu!) was revealed, consisting of the most promising trainee members from AKB48, SKE48, NMB48 and HKT48. The selected members are Okada, Mako Kojima, Miki Nishino, Ryoha Kitagawa, Nagisa Shibuya, Meru Tashima and Mio Tomonaga; Okada, Kojima, and Nishino, the three AKB48 members of the unit, also became known as the Three Musketeers. (Note: 三銃士, Sanjūshi) The Three Musketeers were later promoted to Team 4 in August 2013, during the third day of the group's Tokyo Dome concert.

On January 29, 2014, Okada and fellow Kanagawa native members Ryoka Oshima and Rina Kawaei formed "Team Kanagawa" to promote the new trains in the Yokohama Line. Later in May, she was selected to sing AKB48's 36th single title track "Labrador Retriever".

In the sixth AKB48 Group general election to determine the lineup for their 37th single, Okada ranked for the first time in 51st place, becoming part of Future Girls (Note: Members who placed 49th to 64th) which performed the song "Seikaku ga Warui Onna no Ko" in the single "Kokoro no Placard".

In September, Okada was part of the cast for the AKB48 stage adaptation of the manga AKB49: Ren'ai Kinshi Jōrei, playing Haruko Mizuno. In the group's fifth Janken Tournament, (Note: Rock-paper-scissors tournament) she placed 14th and appeared in the B-side of the winner Miyuki Watanabe's solo single. For the group's 38th single "Kibouteki Refrain", Okada was not selected to sing the title track, but was assigned as one of the centers (lead performers) along with Nagisa Sakaguchi for one of the B-sides, "Ima, Happy".

In June 2015, Okada placed 29th in the seventh AKB48 Group general election.

=== 2016–2019: Rise to prominence, appointed STU48 captain ===
On May 28, 2016, Okada went on hiatus due to poor health. She returned three weeks later, a day before the 8th AKB48 Group general election in which she placed 14th, thus entering the elected Senbatsu (Note: 選抜 (lit. 'Selection'), members selected to perform the title song of a single, which were ranks 1-16 in the 2016 election. For non-election singles, the lineups are decided by the group's management team.) for the first time. In her acceptance speech, she revealed that her hiatus was due to functional hypoglycemia and that she had considered leaving the group. This was later elaborated in her solo documentary, aired in November on TBS as the fourth episode of the series AKB48 Inside Story, (Note: AKB48裏ストーリー, AKB48 Ura Story) titled "Nana Okada, 19 Years Old: The Price of a Dream". (Note: 岡田奈々19歳、夢の代償, Okada Nana, 19-sai, Yume no Daishō)

Since then, Okada has become part of AKB48's main lineup and performed in all the title tracks of their singles, as well as her first solo song "Coin Toss" in the AKB48 album Thumbnail (2017). On February 22, 2017, Okada announced that she would be holding a concurrent position in the new sister group STU48 and serve as the group's captain; she would later cite this appointment as what solidified her decision to continue in the entertainment industry. In July, Okada placed ninth in the 9th AKB48 Group general election.

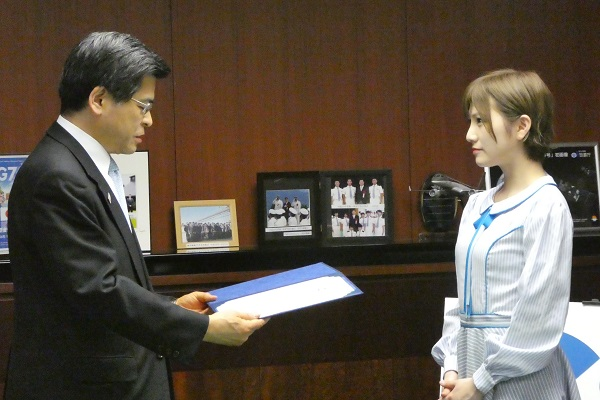
Minister Keiichi Ishii presenting letter of appointment of STU48 as "C to Sea Project" ambassador to Okada as captain, 2018.

On January 16, 2018, Okada held her first solo concert at Tokyo Dome City Hall, billed "Nana Okada Solo Concert: My Precious Things", in which she performed 23 songs. She also released her first photobook, titled Kazaranai Hoseki (Note: 飾らない宝石 (lit. 'Undecorated Jewelry')) and photographed in Hawaii, on February 27, and became the center (lead performer) of an AKB48 title track for the first time in the 56th single "Jabaja", released on March 14.

Okada co-starred in the stage adaptation of the television drama Majimuri Gakuen (2018) as Nero, who seeks to start a war between two rival schools and was partly inspired by the Roman emperor Nero. She later portrayed main character Shozo Hirono in an all-female stage adaptation of Battles Without Honor and Humanity directed by Shutaro Oku, titled Battles Without Honor and Humanity: Women's Battle to the Death (2019) and performed at the Hakata-za in Fukuoka in a collaboration to commemorate the theater's twentieth anniversary.

In June 2018, Okada placed fifth in the tenth AKB48 Group general election with 75,067 votes, thus becoming a Kami 7. (Note: 神7 (lit. 'God 7'), AKB48 Group members who placed within the top seven ranks) In her acceptance speech, she encouraged the idol otakus to take pride in their support of AKB48 Group. It would be the last general election held by the group.

Okada underwent surgery for vocal cord nodules in August and was unable to speak for some time while recovering. In December, the AKB48 Group held its first AKB48 Group No. 1 Singing Ability Competition, (Note: AKB48グループNo. 1歌唱力決定戦, AKB48 Group Number 1 Kashō-ryoku Kettei-sen) spanning all six Japan-based groups. Okada earned the highest score in the qualification round, in which 155 members participated, and placed third in the finals. In the second event held in October 2019, she placed first again in the qualification round, but did not place within the top three in the finals.

STU48's second single "Kaze o Matsu", released in February 2019, would include "Shukkō" (出航; transl. Setting Sail), the first and only STU48 song with Okada as solo lead singer. (Note: Okada would co-lead with Yura Ikeda in "Soshite Boku wa Boku Janaku Naru" from STU48's sixth single in 2021.) On March 14, the training and publishing company Benesse released an original promotional anime which featured Okada in her first voice acting role and "Shukkō" as its ending song.

On July 27, Okada took part in AKB48's first ever live performance in Malaysia, which was part of the Japan Expo Malaysia 2019 at Pavilion Kuala Lumpur.

=== 2020–2023: YouTube channels, solo activities, departure from STU48 and AKB48 ===
Okada stepped down as STU48 captain on January 18, 2020 and continued as a regular member until she officially left the group in March 2022, after her final single participation in "Hetaretachi yo" (2021). Her farewell concert, billed "STU48 Nana Okada Last Concert: Sailing day from Nana", (Note: STU48 岡田奈々ラストコンサート 〜Sailing day from NANA〜) was held at the Kobe Kokusai Hall on March 18. During her time with the group, Okada had also taken on her first stage producer role for STU48's second original stage set list, titled Bokutachi no Koi no Yokan. (Note: 僕たちの恋の予感 (lit. 'Premonition of Our Love'))

Okada and fellow AKB48 members Yuiri Murayama, Shinobu Mogi, and Mion Mukaichi launched their joint YouTube channel, the YuuNaaMogiOn Channel (ゆうなぁもぎおんチャンネル), on January 21, 2020. The next day, Okada and Murayama, together known as "YuuNaa" (ゆうなぁ), performed in a duo concert billed "YuuNaa Independent Concert: Irreplaceable Time" (Note: "Irreplaceable time" is the meaning of the apple mint in hanakotoba, and Murayama and Okada are associated with the apple and mint (particularly mint chocolate), which were also referenced in the concert. However, this connection has never been officially confirmed.) at the Tokyo Dome City Hall. Several AKB48 members participated as guest performers, including Mogi, Mukaichi, and former Team 4 captain Minami Minegishi, and the rock band Gacharic Spin served as backup band. Backstage reporting of the concert by Mogi and Mukaichi was released on the YouTube channel.

Okada took third place in the 3rd AKB48 Group No. 1 Singing Ability Competition in December 2020 and joined the vocal group consisting of the event's top nine finalists, later named Nona Diamonds and represented by the agency Zest. In AKB48's 58th single "Nemohamo Rumor" (2021), Okada was appointed title song center for the second time after "Jabaja". She reprised her role as Nero in the stage play Majimuri Gakuen: Loudness (2021), where in contrast to previous installments of the Gakuen series, Nero calls for peace between the opposing factions in the end; idol journalist Hana Inukai connected this to AKB48's recent trend of reducing internal rivalry to present a united front. She took first place in the fourth Singing Ability Competition in January 2022 and was rewarded with her second solo song, "Kowasanakucha Ikenai Mono", (Note: 壊さなくちゃいけないもの (lit. 'Something that needs to be destroyed')) which was released as part of AKB48's 59th single "Motokaredesu" (2022). The song is a rock ballad and the music video depicted her as a "fallen angel" singing on a building rooftop against a cityscape. In April 2022, Okada was officially transferred to AKB48 Team A, leaving Team 4 after eight years and eight months of service.

In July 2021, Okada launched her individual YouTube channel and announced that she has joined the Avex Asunaro talent agency with the goal of expanding her solo activities. These include appearances in the television drama Stolen Love, High School Teacher (2021) and a stage play adaptation of Magi (2022). She also held her second solo concert in commemoration of her decade in the entertainment industry, titled "Starting Over" in English, on July 3, 2022 at the Hitomi Memorial Hall in Tokyo with an additional performance scheduled for July 10 at the Kanagawa Kenmin Hall, which would also be livestreamed. During the concert, she performed the first song for which she wrote all the lyrics, titled "Kono Yo Kara Boku Dake ga Kieru Koto ga Dekitara". (Note: この世から僕だけが消えることができたら (If I Alone Could Disappear from This World))

Okada wrote the lyrics for Bangkok-based group BNK48's 12th single "Believers" (2022). She had previously contributed lyrics for BNK48 and its sister group CGM48, based in Chiang Mai. Yuiri Murayama would produce the choreography for the single.

On November 7, 2022, coinciding with her 25th birthday, Okada announced her first solo national tour, titled "Timeless Flag", which would take place from January to February 2023, with eight shows in seven prefectures. Following reports published by Shūkan Bunshun alleging that she and actor Hiroki Ino were in a relationship, on November 23, 2022, Okada announced that she was leaving AKB48. Her farewell concert took place on April 1, 2023, at the Kanagawa Kenmin Hall, followed by her final performance at the AKB48 Theater in Akihabara the next day.

=== 2023–present: Solo career ===
Okada's official fan club, later named Nanairo ("seven colors" in Japanese), was launched on June 14, 2023, and she announced her debut solo album during its launch commemoration event in Shinsaibashi, Osaka. The album, titled Asymmetry, was released on November 7, her 26th birthday. All the lyrics were written by her, and the Blu-ray bonus content included footage from the "Starting Over" and "Timeless Flag" concerts. However, the Asymmetry tour, scheduled for early 2024, was cancelled as she went into hiatus for health reasons.

On January 1, 2026, Okada announced that she had left Avex Asunaro (now Avex AY Factory) the previous day, stating that she would continue her activities "at her own pace". She would star alongside Yuiri Murayama in the double-bill production Kōhei Tsuka Revolutionary Musical Doubles: Hiryuden/Bakumatsu Junjoden, scheduled to run from November 5 to November 22, 2026, at the Kinokuniya Southern Theatre Takashimaya in Tokyo. Both of them were double cast as lead character Michiko Kanbayashi in Hiryuden. Additionally, through their collaboration in this project, the duo formed the musical unit Yunaris, performing new original songs featured within the show.

== Public image ==
Early in her entertainment career, Okada presented a majime (真面目; lit. 'serious' or 'earnest') persona, such as by establishing rules of conduct for her fellow 14th generation members and consistently speaking in a formal manner. While she is still described as such, the persona has evolved into an "eccentric" image as her career progressed.

Okada is a supporter of the LGBT community and is a member of it, coming out as non-binary before the release of her album Asymmetry.

Okada is known for her continuing close friendship with fellow former AKB48 member Yuiri Murayama; both of them had been members of Team 4 since they became full AKB48 members, until Okada was transferred to Team A in April 2022. They are referred to by the blended name "YuuNaa" (ゆうなぁ), which is later officially used as their duo concert title and part of their joint YouTube channel name with Shinobu Mogi and Mion Mukaichi, themselves known as "MogiOn" (もぎおん). In 2026, they reunited as the duo Yunaris.

== Personal life ==
Okada is named after the number seven (七, nana), the day of her birth. She lives in Kanagawa Prefecture, but was born in Neyagawa in Osaka Prefecture and lived there until she was three years old. She has two older brothers and a younger sister. Her eldest brother is a medical professional and often gives her dietary advice. Her sister, Rina, occasionally accompanies her in live streaming sessions and public appearances, notably at the 2016 AKB48 Janken Tournament where they cosplayed as characters from the anime series Re:Zero − Starting Life in Another World. The family has owned two Toy Poodles.

In a November 2023 interview with Aera Dot, Okada revealed that she was a non-binary and was in a relationship with a man. She had been attracted to both men and women in the past, and had considered herself a lesbian while in AKB48, particularly around July 2017 when she was in a relationship with a woman who "wholeheartedly supported" her.

Before joining AKB48, Okada had aspired to become a doctor. Her personal hero is former AKB48 Group General Manager Minami Takahashi.

== Discography ==
=== Solo ===
==== Studio albums ====
List of studio albums, with selected peak chart positions and sales
Title	Details	Peak chart positions		Sales	Notes
Title	Details	JPN	JPN Hot	Sales	Notes
Asymmetry	Released: November 7, 2023; Label: Avex Trax; Formats: CD, CD+DVD, digital download	9	11	JPN: 9,508	
Contrust	Release: November 27, 2024; Label: Avex Trax; Formats: CD, CD+DVD, digital download	16	16	JPN: 6,095	
Unformel	Release: November 12, 2025; Label: Avex Trax; Formats: CD, CD+Blu-ray, digital download	22	—	JPN: 4,113	Placed 64th on the Billboard Japan Top Albums Sales chart (1st week of December 2025)

=== AKB48 ===
Okada's first participation in an AKB48 title song was in "Labrador Retriever" (2014), followed by "Bokutachi wa Tatakawanai" (2015), and she has been part of all title song lineups since "Tsubasa wa Iranai" (2016) until "Hisashiburi no Lip Gloss" (2022). Notable appearances include:

- "Otona e no Michi" ("Uza" B-side, 2012), first appearance in a single (as trainee)
- "Kimi Dake ni Chu! Chu! Chu!" ("Heart Electric" B-side, 2013), first Tentōmu Chu! song
- "Ima, Happy" ("Kibouteki Refrain" B-side, 2014), first co-center
- "Love Trip" (2016), first appearance as elected Senbatsu
- "Dare no Koto wo Ichiban Aishiteiru?" ("Shoot Sign" B-side, 2017), AKB48 Group collaboration with Sakamichi Series
- "Jabaja" (2018), first title song center
- "Sentimental Train" (2018), first appearance as Kami 7
- "Hitsuzensei" ("Jiwaru Days" B-side, 2019), AKB48 Group collaboration with Sakamichi Series and Iz*One
- "Mata Aeru Hi Made" ("Shitsuren, Arigatō" B-side, 2020), Minami Minegishi's graduation song
- "Nemohamo Rumor" (2021), center

==== Solo songs ====
- "Coin Toss" (Thumbnail, 2017)
- "Kowasanakucha Ikenai Mono" ("Motokare Desu" B-side, 2022)
- "Kono Yo Kara Boku Dake ga Kieru Koto ga Dekitara" (also songwriter, live only, 2022)

=== STU48 ===
Okada has also been part of all STU48 title song lineups from "Kurayami" (2018) to "Hetaretachi yo" (2021). Notable appearances include:

- "Setouchi no Koe" ("Negaigoto no Mochigusare" B-side, 2017), first STU48 original song
- "Shukkō" ("Kaze wo Matsu" B-side, 2019), center
- "Soshite Boku wa Boku Janaku naru" ("Hitorigoto de Kataru Kurainara" B-side, 2021), performed with 3rd AKB48 Group No. 1 Singing Ability Competition finalists from STU48
- "Kōkai Nanka Aruwakenai" ("Hetaretachi yo" B-side, 2021), farewell song

=== Nona Diamonds ===
- "Hajimari no Uta" (2021), placed 14th on the Weekly Oricon Singles chart

== Bibliography ==
Year	Title	ISBN	Notes
2018	Kazaranai Hoseki (飾らない宝石, Undecorated Jewelry)	ISBN 9784847049989	Photobook

== Appearances ==
=== Variety and talk shows ===
- Tentoumu-Chu! no Sekai o Muchu ni Sasemasu Sengen! (てんとうむChu!の世界をムチューにさせます宣言!; Tentoumu Chu! Declaration to Dazzle the World!) (Nippon TV, 2014), regular cast
- Mirai Monster (Fuji TV, 2022–present), co-host
- AKB48 Sayonara Mōri-san (AKB48 サヨナラ毛利さん) (Nippon TV, 2022–present), irregular appearances

=== TV dramas ===
- Joshikouseisatsu (女子高警察; High School Girl Police) (Fuji TV, 2013–2014), herself
- Majisuka Gakuen 4 (Nippon TV, 2015), Katabutsu
- Majisuka Gakuen 5 (Hulu Japan, 2015), Katabutsu
- AKB Horror Night: Adrenaline's Night, Ep. 34 "The Way Home" (2016)
- AKB Love Night: Love Factory, Ep. 23 "The Look of the Love Sky" (2016), Manami
- Kyabasuka Gakuen (Nippon TV, 2016), Katabutsu (Karei)
- Stolen Love, High School Teacher (奪い愛、高校教師, Ubai Ai, Kōkō Kyōshi) (TV Asahi, 2021), Akari Hoshino

=== Theater ===
- AKB49: Ren'ai Kinshi Jōrei stage adaptation (2014), Haruko Mizuno
- Majisuka Gakuen: Lost in The Supermarket (2016), Katabutsu
- Romeo and Juliet (2018), Juliet (Theater Renacchi production)
- Majimuri Gakuen Stage Play (2018), Nero
- Battles Without Honor and Humanity: Women's Battle to the Death (仁義なき戦い～彼女(おんな)たちの死闘篇～, Jinji Naki Tatakai ~Onnatachi no Shitōhen~) (2019), Shozo Hirono
- Majimuri Gakuen: Loudness (2021), Nero
- Yayoi, Sanatsu – Kimi wo Aishita 30nen- (2022), Sakura Watanabe
- Musical "Magi" – Dungeon Kumikyoku (2022), Morgiana

=== Solo and independent concerts ===
- "Nana Okada Solo Concert: My Precious Things" (岡田奈々ソロコンサート～私が大切にしたいもの～, Okada Nana Solo Concert ～Watashi ga Taisetsu ni Shitaimono～) (2018)
- "YuuNaa Independent Concert: Irreplaceable Time" (ゆうなぁ単独コンサート〜かけがえのない時間〜, YuuNaa Tandoku Concert 〜Kakegae no Nai Jikan〜) (2020)
- Nana Okada 10th Anniversary Concert "Starting Over" (2022)

=== Fashion show ===
- MyNavi Tokyo Girls Collection 2021 Autumn/Winter

== Production ==
=== Stage ===
- STU48 2nd original stage set list Bokutachi no Koi no Yokan (僕たちの恋の予感, "Premonition of Our Love") (2020–2022)

=== Music ===
- BNK48 12th single "Believers" (2022), as lyricist
