= Hana wa Dare no Mono? =

Single by Japanese group STU48

- Theater edition cover

Single by STU48
- B-side: "Fune kara Orita Bokutachi wa…" (Type-A); "Ponytail o Hodoita Kimi o Mita" (Type-B); "Sure, Jā ne" (Theater)
- Released: April 13, 2022
- Genre: J-pop
- Label: King Records
- Composer: Masaharu Tsuruku
- Lyricist: Yasushi Akimoto
- Producer: Yasushi Akimoto

STU48 singles chronology
"Hetaretachi yo" (2021)	"Hana wa Dare no Mono?" (2022)	"Iki o Suru Kokoro" (2023)

Music video
- "Hana wa Dare no Mono?" on YouTube
- "Hana wa Dare no Mono?" (dance-lyrics MV) on YouTube

"Hana wa Dare no Mono?" (Japanese: 花は誰のもの？; lit. 'Who Does the Flower Belong To?') is the eighth single by Japanese idol group STU48, released on April 13, 2022. The lead performer for the title song rotates between Yumiko Takino, Chiho Ishida, and Mai Nakamura in an unusual "triangle center" system. A short film featuring the performers of the title song was released on YouTube as part of the single's promotion.

== Production and release ==
"Hana wa Dare no Mono?" is the first single released after the departure of former STU48 captain Nana Okada in March 2022. The single was first announced on February 11 and the title was revealed in mid-March. It was released in five editions: regular and limited editions of Types A and B and a Theater edition. The limited editions included digital ballots to vote for the group's Setouchi PR Unit.

According to songwriter and AKB48 Group producer Yasushi Akimoto, the title song lyrics were inspired by the 2022 Russian invasion of Ukraine and the threat of nuclear war, and he assigned the song to STU48 as they are primarily active in Hiroshima, the first city in history to have been devastated by a nuclear bomb. It utilizes an unusual "triangle center" system, where the center (lead performer) position would rotate between Yumiko Takino, Chiho Ishida, and Mai Nakamura for each performance. This has been compared to the "three arrows" parable, attributed to the feudal lord Mōri Motonari, who was based in Aki Province.

On November 23, 2022, the song became the first AKB48 Group song to be featured on the YouTube channel The First Take, performed solo by Ishida.

On May 4, 2023, during the "Hiroshima Mirai Baton" show at Edion Stadium Hiroshima, held to commemorate the 49th G7 summit, the group performed "Hana wa Dare no Mono?" with parts of it translated to the languages of the other G7 countries: English, Italian, French, and German.

== Short film ==
Hikari wa Kimi ni, Ano Hibi ni
- Full film
- Trailer

A 31-minute short film or "drama music video", titled Hikari wa Kimi ni, Ano Hibi ni (光は君に、あの日々に。, lit. 'The Light for You, in Those Days') and directed by Junichi Kanai, was released on March 31, 2022 on the group's YouTube channel, with English subtitles, as part of the single's promotion. The filming took place at the Kirara Beach and other locations in Yamaguchi. All performers of the title song appear in the drama, and Hiroshima-born singer Hitomi Shimatani portrayed the choir club teacher. The music video for the title song depicts scenes from the film.

=== Plot ===
Yumiko, Chiho, and Mai are good friends who were members of the choir club in middle school. They have a falling out when they enter high school because Yumiko opts to enter the photography club instead of continuing in the choir club as the three had promised. Despite that, Yumiko takes to watching the choir club practice from the photography club room. In their third year, an important choir contest that the club have been practicing for has been cancelled due to the COVID-19 pandemic. So that their training would not go to waste, Yumiko offers the photography club's help to document the choir club's performance at a beach near the school. She also reveals that she did not join the choir club due to sudden hearing loss and had planned to join them if her hearing improved. Chiho and Mai agree and the three reconcile. Years later, they meet at the same beach and reminisce over the photos still stored in Yumiko's camera.

== Reception ==
"Hana wa Dare no Mono" sold about 157,500 copies in its release week according to Oricon and placed second in both the Oricon Singles and Billboard Japan Hot 100 charts. The song also placed on the top three of the Weekly Usen Hit J-Pop Ranking chart in July, three months after its release. The dance-lyrics music video, published in May, reached 3 million views in October. The group also made its first appearances on the prime-time shows Music Station on TV Asahi in August and Music Blood on Nippon TV in September to perform the song, which was considered unusual for a music release already past its promotional period. A re-release titled the "Extra Edition" was announced for release on November 2, and as of October 7, the single has sold over 440,000 copies, surpassing the group's previous best-selling 2020 single "Mubō na Yume wa Sameru Koto ga Nai".

Sports Nippon partly attributed the song's public recognition to its first line, Moshi kono sekai kara kokkyō ga kietara (もしこの世界から国境が消えたら, If borders disappear from this world), which is often misheard as Moshi kono sekai kara Tōkyō ga kietara (もしこの世界から東京が消えたら, If Tokyo disappears from this world) and drove unfamiliar listeners to find more information about the song.

== Track listing ==
1. "Hana wa Dare no Mono?" (花は誰のもの？)
2. Different song on each edition:
  - Type-A: "Fune Kara Orita Bokutachi wa..." (船から降りた僕たちは・・・)
  - Type-B: "Ponytail o Hodoita Kimi o Mita" (ポニーテールをほどいた君を見た)
  - Theater Edition: "Sure, Jā ne" (Sure、じゃあね)
3. Hana wa Dare no Mono? (off-vocal)
4. Off-vocal version of track 2

=== DVD ===
1. Different video on each edition:
  - Type-A: "Hana wa Dare no Mono?" Music Video
  - Type-B: Hikari wa Kimi ni, Ano Hibi ni Drama Music Video

== Personnel ==
=== "Hana wa Dare no Mono?" ===
Centers: Chiho Ishida, Yumiko Takino, Mai Nakamura

Minami Ishida, Chiho Ishida, Mitsuki Imamura, Hina Iwata, Akari Fukuda, Arisa Mineyoshi, Kokoa Kai, Yumiko Takino, Yūka Oki, Mai Nakamura, Anna Kawamata, Aiko Kojima, Sayaka Takao, Rinko Yoshizaki, Sara Yoshida, Momoka Rissen

=== "Fune Kara Orita Bokutachi wa..." ===
Mahina Taniguchi, Aoi Hyōdō, Maiha Morishita, Honoka Yano, Soraha Shinano, Yura Ikeda, Rine Utsumi, Serika Osaki, Yūna Kawamata, Riko Kudo, Himeka Sako, Sara Shimizu, Ayaka Suzuki, Miho Tanaka, Sayaka Harada, Rika Muneyuki, Natsuki Watanabe

=== "Ponytail o Hodoita Kimi o Mita" ===
Minami Ishida, Yumiko Takino, Akari Fukuda, Yūka Oki, Mai Nakamura

=== "Sure, Jā ne" ===
Chiho Ishida, Hina Iwata, Kokoa Kai, Momoka Rissen

== Charts ==
2022 year-end chart performance for "Hana wa Dare no Mono"
Chart (2022)	Position
Japan (Oricon)	28
