= Shinichiro Kobayashi =

Japanese photographer

- 小林 伸一郎
- Born: October 19, 1956 (age 69); Bunkyō-ku, Tokyo
- Education: Senshu University
- Occupation: Photographer
- Website: https://kobayashi-shinichiro.com/

Shinichiro Kobayashi (小林 伸一郎, Kobayashi Shin'ichirō) (born 19 October 1956) is a Japanese photographer, and "the leading practitioner if not the founder of the ever-popular 'Ruins' or 'Urban Exploration' genre of photography".

== Life and career ==
Born in Bunkyō-ku, Tokyo, on 19 October 1956, Kobayashi graduated from the Economics department of Senshu University in 1978. After working for studios and publishing, he went freelance in 1984, and set up Studio Rise (Sutajio Raizu, スタジオライズ) in 1988. He won various photography awards in the 1990s.

Prints from Kobayashi's Deathtopia series are in the permanent collection of the Tokyo Metropolitan Museum of Photography.

== Awards ==
- 38th Kōdansha publishing culture prize for photography, 2007, for 亡骸劇場 (Nakigara gekijō) and 東京ディズニーシー (Tokyo Disneysea).

== Solo exhibitions ==
- Building the Chanel Lumière Tower. Tokyo Metropolitan Museum of Photography, March–April 2005. About the creation of the Chanel Ginza building.
- Umihito 1977–1988 = 海人1977〜1988. Nakata Museum (Onomichi, Hiroshima Prefecture), October–November 2008.
- Hachinohe City. Kōdansha K-Square building, near Gokoku-ji, Tokyo, October 2009.
- Shimanami Setouchi-kai (島波 瀬戸内海). Nakata Museum, March–May 2011.
- Torigoe now (鳥越NOW). Ueno Royal Museum, July 2019. About Torigoe.
