= Onomichi City Museum of Art =

Museum in Onomichi, Hiroshima Prefecture, Japan

- 尾道市立美術館
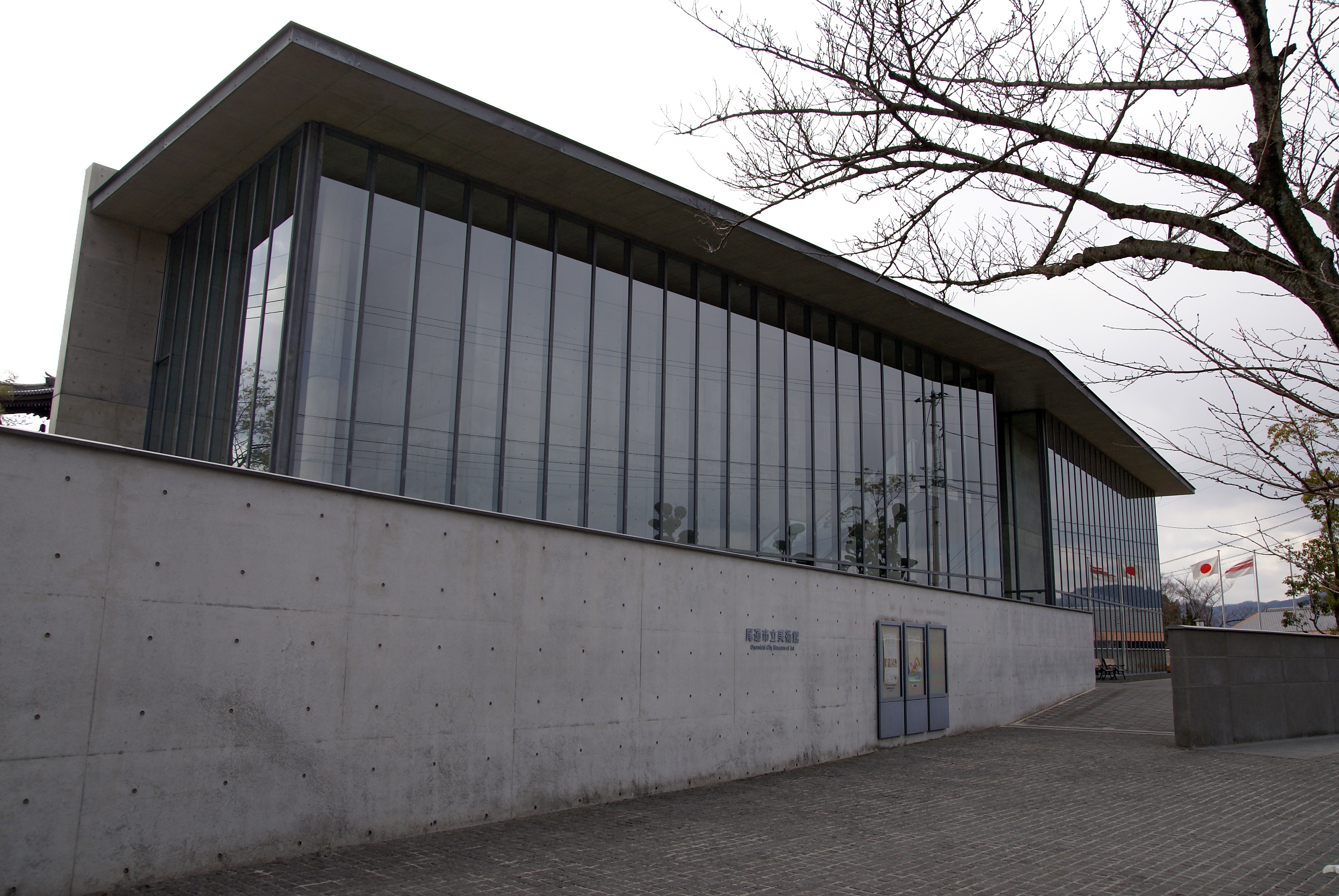
- Interactive map of the Onomichi City Museum of Art area

General information
- Location: 17−19 Nishitsuchidō-chō, Onomichi, Hiroshima Prefecture, Japan
- Coordinates: 34°24′36″N 133°11′45″E
- Opened: 1980
- Renovated: 11 January 2003

Design and construction
- Architect: Tadao Ando

Website
- www.onomichi-museum.jp

Onomichi City Museum of Art (尾道市立美術館, Onomichi shiritsu bijutsukan) opened in Senkō-ji Park in Onomichi, Hiroshima Prefecture, Japan, in 1980. The Museum reopened to a design by Tadao Ando in 2003. The collection includes works by Kobayashi Wasaku (小林和作) and Wada Eisaku (和田英作).

The museum has become notable on the Internet for being visited on a regular basis by two cats, whom the museum guards have to repeatedly turn away due to the museum's strict "no animals" policy. One of the cats, Ken-chan, passed away in September 2025, and the museum has produced a 2026 calendar in its memory.

== Collection ==
The museum contains artworks by artists connected to the city, such as Guilin-in Hirata and Wasaku Kobayashi, as well as artworks by well known foreign artists such as French painter Georges Rouault.

== Access ==
The Museum is located in Senkō-ji Park, roughly 20 minutes walk from Onomichi station.

== See also ==
- Nakata Museum
- List of Cultural Properties of Japan - paintings (Hiroshima)
