= Kaze o Matsu =

- Theater edition cover, featuring Yumiko Takino

Single by STU48
- B-side: "Shukkō"; "Yume Chikara" (Type-A); "Seifuku no Omosa" (Type-B); "Genten" (Type-C); "Yagate Nanohana ga Saku Koro" (Type-D); "Dareka to Itai" (Theater)
- Released: February 13, 2019
- Genre: J-pop
- Label: King Records
- Lyricist: Yasushi Akimoto
- Producer: Yasushi Akimoto

STU48 singles chronology
"Kurayami" (2018)	"Kaze o Matsu" (2019)	"Daisuki na Hito" (2019)

Music video
- "Kaze o Matsu" on YouTube
- "Shukkō" on YouTube

"Kaze o Matsu" (Japanese: 風を待つ; lit. 'Waiting for the Wind') is the second single by Japanese idol group STU48, released on February 13, 2019. Yumiko Takino served as lead performer for the title song. It topped the Japanese music charts in its release week.

== Production and release ==
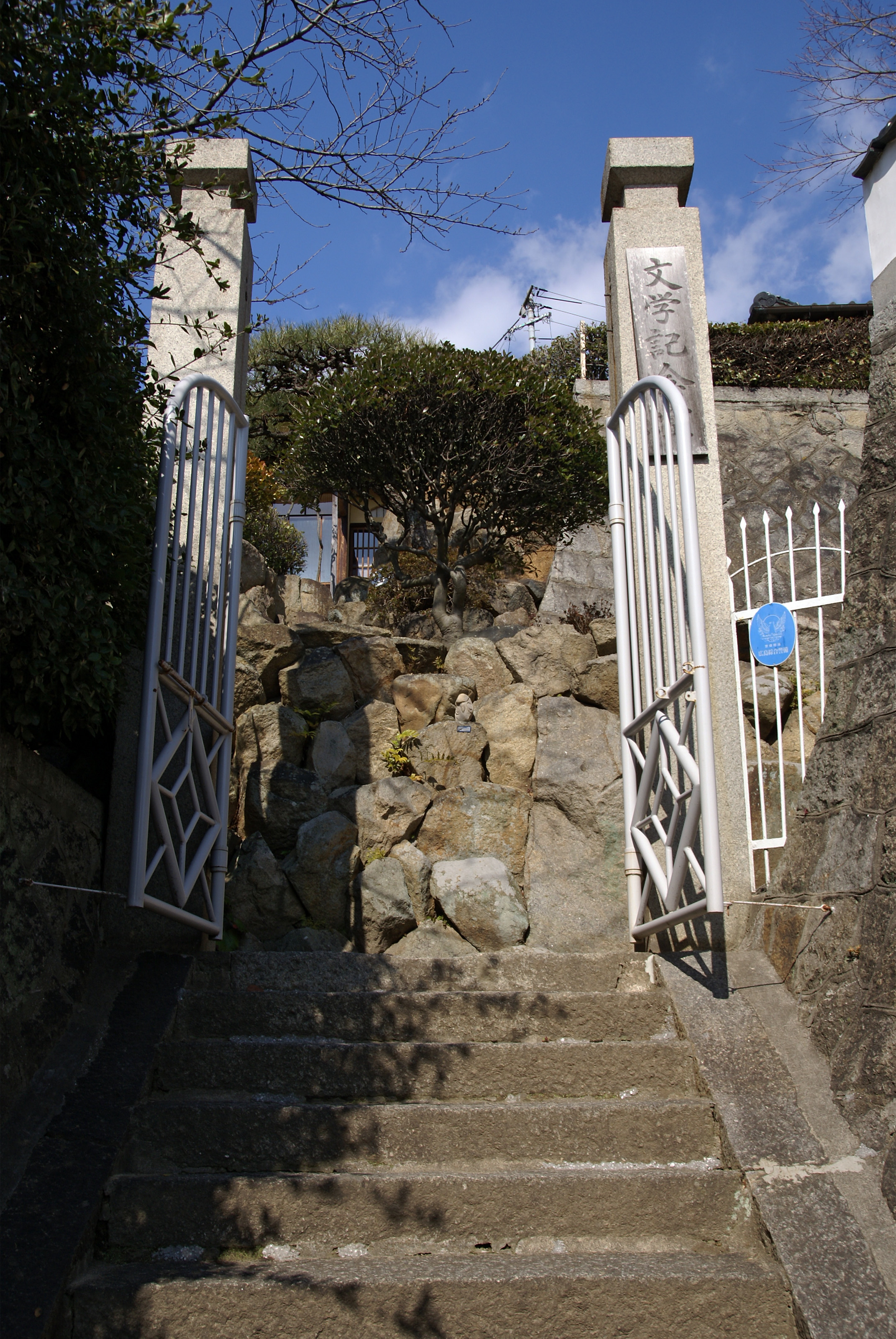
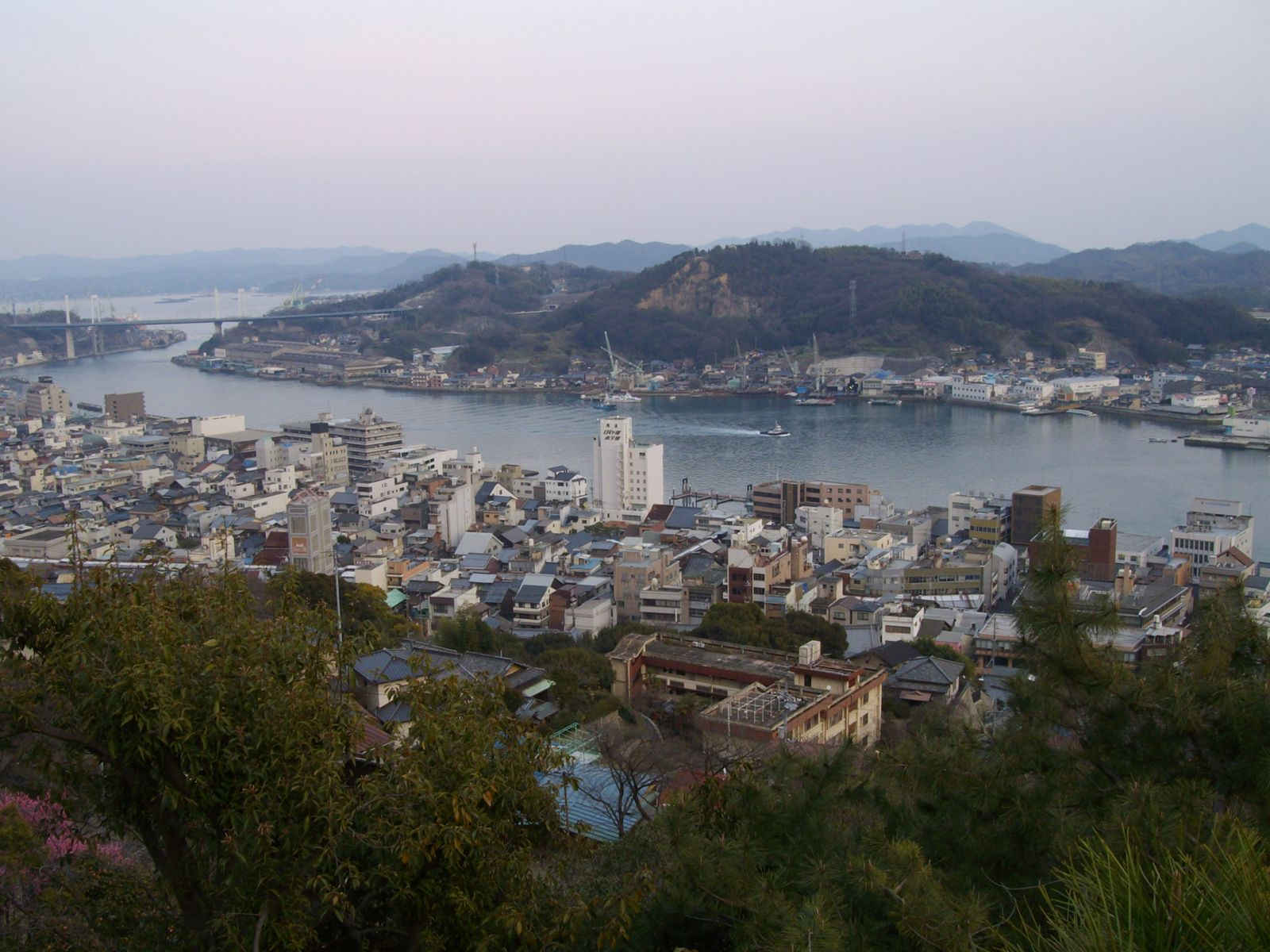
The MV starts at the entrance to the Literature Memorial Chamber and ends with a bird's eye view of the Onomichi cityscape

The music video for the title song was filmed in one long take by quadcopter drone on location near the Senkō-ji temple in Onomichi, Hiroshima. It depicts the members dancing up the Onomichi hill and was released on December 26, 2018. Production took place over two days and ten full takes were filmed. Several alternate takes were published on the single's website.

The single was released in five editions. The B-side "Shukkō" (出航; lit. 'Setting Sail'), included in all editions, features the first appearance in a music video of the group's theater ship STU48-go, the first ship with an onboard theater in Japan which was still under remodeling during production, and was performed by all 33 members and trainees, led by captain Nana Okada. B-side "Yume Chikara" (Note: 夢力; "Dream Power") was originally produced for a commercial for the Cream Genmai Bran candy bar and performed by the one-shot subunit CGB41, also led by Takino and called Asahi Food's "first idol group". "Seifuku no Omosa" (Note: 制服の重さ; "Weight of the Uniform") was performed by members born in the 20th century, while "Genten" (Note: 原点; "Starting Point") was performed by those born in the 21st century. "Yagate Nanohana ga Saku Koro" (Note: やがて菜の花が咲く頃; "Soon, When the Rapeseed Blossoms Bloom") was performed by the five trainees recruited from the third AKB48 Group Draft (a joint audition between AKB48 and its Japan-based sister groups), and "Dareka to Itai" (Note: 誰かといたい; "I Want to Be With Someone") was performed by the trio Yuri Torobu, Mitsuki Imamura, and Kōko Tanaka (ToroMichuKokko). The Limited Edition releases included the "STU48 Setouchi School Uniform Guide" bonus video content, featuring the members modelling the real-life uniforms of schools in the Setouchi region.

== Reception ==
"Kaze o Matsu" sold an estimated 302,533 copies in its release week according to Billboard Japan, doubling that of the previous single and placing it first in both the Oricon Singles and Billboard Japan Hot 100 charts.

== Track listing ==
=== CD ===
1. "Kaze o Matsu" (風を待つ)
2. "Shukkō" (出航)
3. Different tracks on each type:
  - Type A: "Yume Chikara" (夢力)
  - Type B: "Seifuku no Omosa" (制服の重さ)
  - Type C: "Genten" (原点)
  - Type D: "Yagate Nanohana ga Saku Koro" (やがて 菜の花が咲く頃)
  - Theater: "Dareka to Itai" (誰かといたい)
4. "Kaze wo Matsu" (instrumental)
5. "Shukkō" (instrumental)
6. Instrumental version of track 3

=== DVD ===
1. "Kaze wo Matsu" Music Video
2. "Shukkō" Music Video
3. Different on each type:
  - Type-A: STU48 Setouchi School Uniform Books vol.1
  - Type-B: STU48 Setouchi School Uniform Books vol.2
  - Type-C: STU48 Setouchi School Uniform Books vol.3
  - Type-D: STU48 Setouchi School Uniform Books vol.4

== Personnel ==
=== "Kaze wo Matsu" ===
Center: Yumiko Takino

- 1st row: Yumiko Takino
- 2nd row: Fū Yabushita, Hina Iwata, Nana Okada
- 3rd row: Chiho Ishida, Kanon Isogai, Mitsuki Imamura, Ayumi Ichioka, Akari Fukuda
- 4th row: Yuri Torobu, Kōko Tanaka, Minami Ishida, Yuka Oki, Mai Nakamura, Miyuna Kadowaki, Cocoa Kai

=== "Shukkō" ===
Center: Nana Okada

Chiho Ishida, Minami Ishida, Kanon Isogai, Ayumi Ichioka, Mitsuki Imamura, Hina Iwata, Nana Okada, Marina Ōtani, Cocoa Kai, Momona Kadota, Miyuna Kadowaki, Miyu Sakaki, Haruka Sano, Nonoka Shintani, Saki Sugahara, Yumiko Takino, Kōko Tanaka, Mahina Taniguchi, Yuri Torobu, Aoi Hyōdo, Akari Fukuda, Azusa Fujiwara, Haruka Mishima, Arisa Mineyoshi, Kaho Mori, Maiha Morishita, Honoka Yano, Fū Yabushita, Yuka Oki, Soraha Shinano, Mai Nakamura, Aiko Mizoguchi, Akari Yura

=== "Yume Chikara" ===
Center: Yumiko Takino

Chiho Ishida, Kanon Isogai, Ayumi Ichioka, Mitsuki Imamura, Hina Iwata, Miyuna Kadowaki, Yumiko Takino, Yuri Torobu, Fū Yabushita

=== "Seifuku no Omosa" ===
Center: Fū Yabushita

Minami Ishida, Kanon Isogai, Nana Okada, Mitsuki Imamura, Momona Kadota, Haruka Sano, Yumiko Takino, Kōko Tanaka, Mahina Taniguchi, Yuri Torobu, Akari Fukuda, Azusa Fujiwara, Haruka Mishima, Kaho Mori, Honoka Yano, Fū Yabushita

=== "Genten" ===
Center: Marina Ōtani

Chiho Ishida, Ayumi Ichioka, Hina Iwata, Marina Ōtani, Cocoa Kai, Miyuna Kadowaki, Miyu Sakaki, Nonoka Shintani, Saki Sugahara, Aoi Hyōdo, Arisa Mineyoshi, Maiha Morishita

=== "Yagate Nanohana ga Saku Koro" ===
Center: Mai Nakamura

Yuka Oki, Soraha Shinano, Mai Nakamura, Aiko Mizoguchi, Akari Yura

=== "Dareka to Itai" ===
Center: Mitsuki Imamura

Mitsuki Imamura, Kōko Tanaka, Yuri Torobu
