= Jikō-ji =

Buddhist temple in Hiroshima Prefecture, Japan

Coordinates: 34°24′26″N 133°11′45″E

Jikō-ji (持光寺)
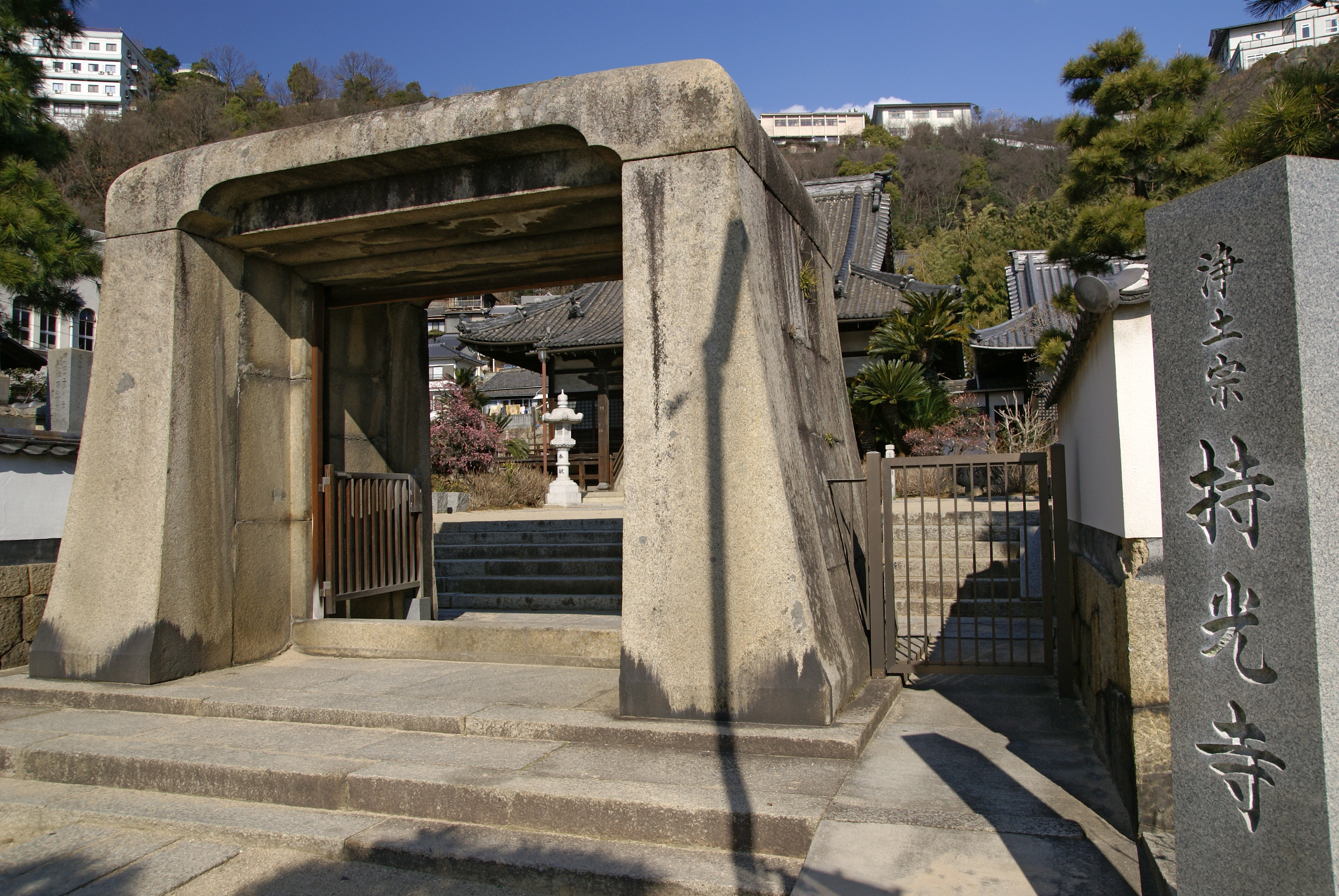

Religion
- Affiliation: Buddhism

Location
- Location: Onomichi, Hiroshima
- Country: Japan
- Interactive map of Jikō-ji (持光寺)

Architecture
- Completed: 834

Jikō-ji (持光寺) is a Buddhist temple in Onomichi, Hiroshima Prefecture, belonging to the Seizan Zenrin-ji of Jōdo-shū Buddhism. Its principal image is a seated image of Amida Nyōrai. The temple houses a National Treasure, an 1153 Heian Period hanging scroll of Fugen Enmei (Samantabhadra).

Statues of the Four Heavenly Kings of Jikō-ji, Takasago, Hyōgo, Japan.

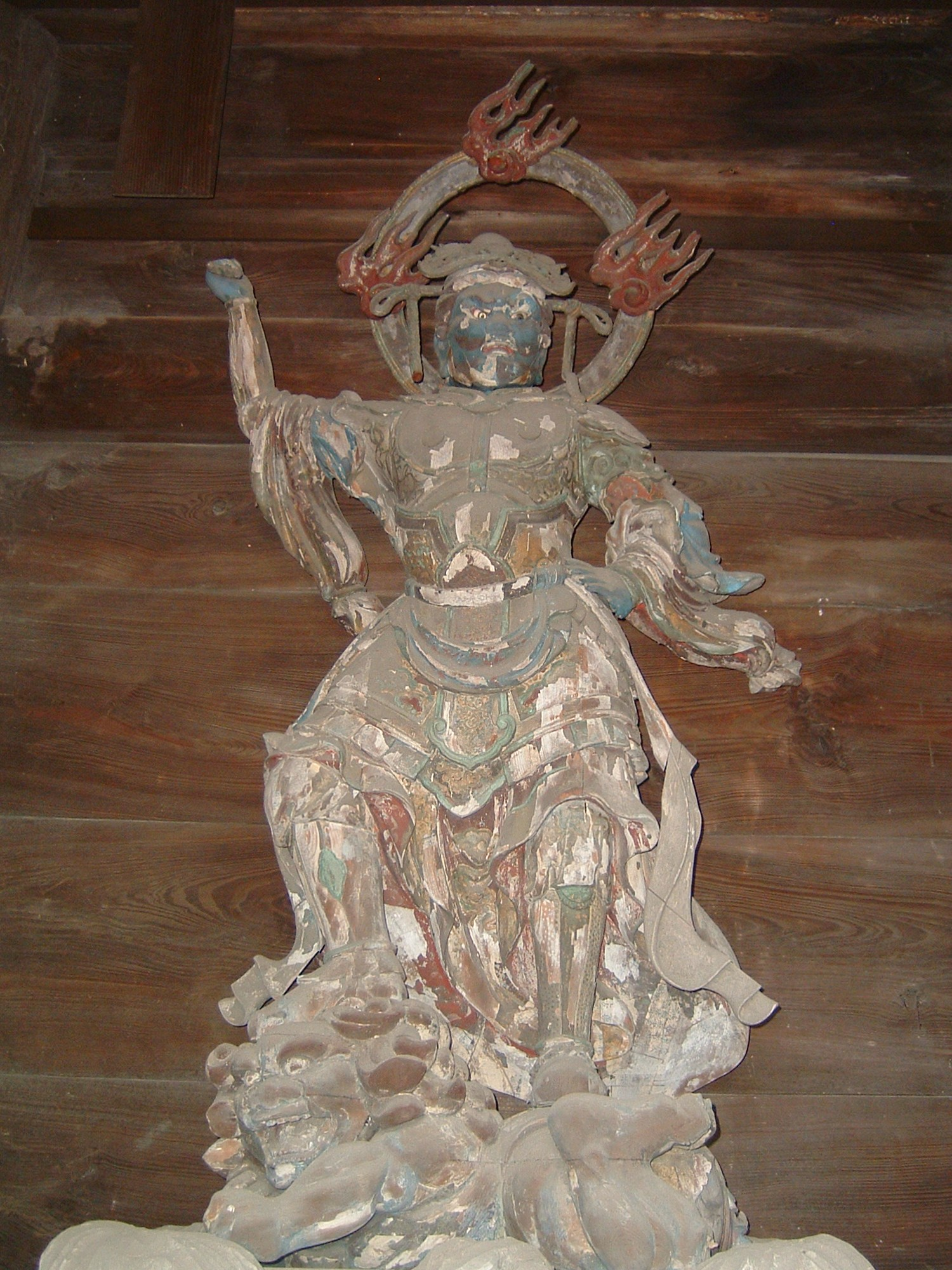
Jikoku-ten (east)

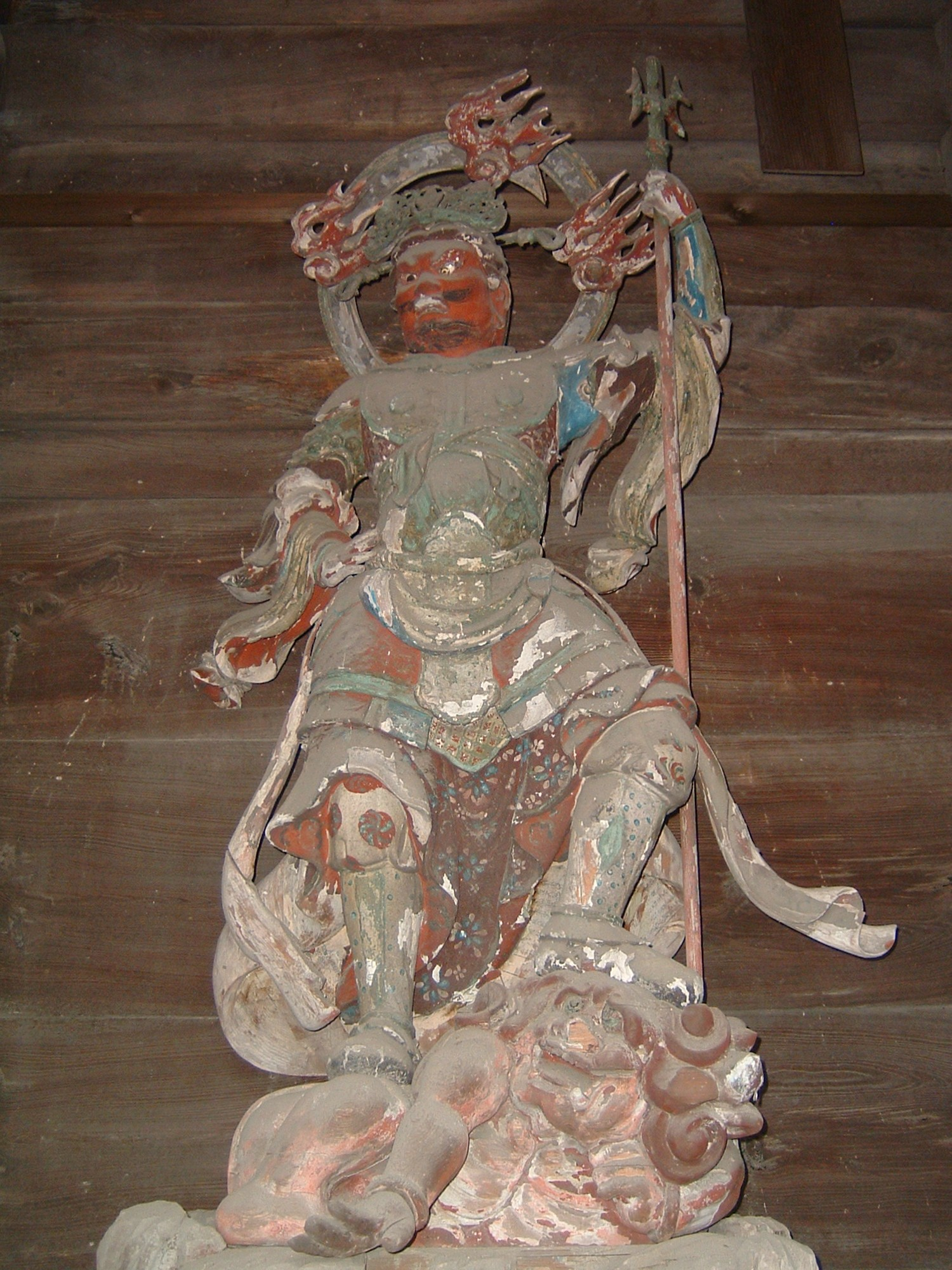
Zōjō-ten (south)

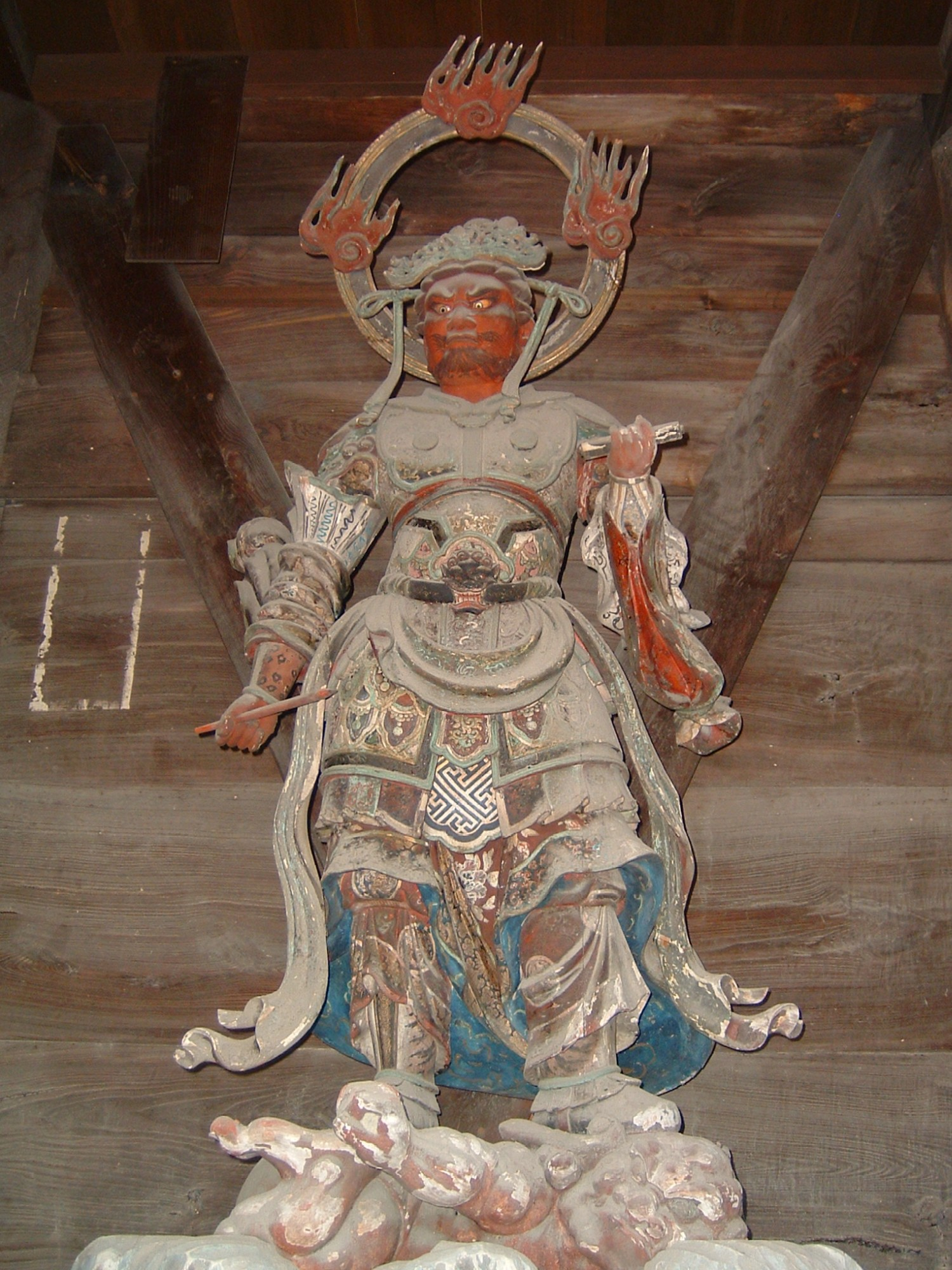
Kōmoku-ten (west)

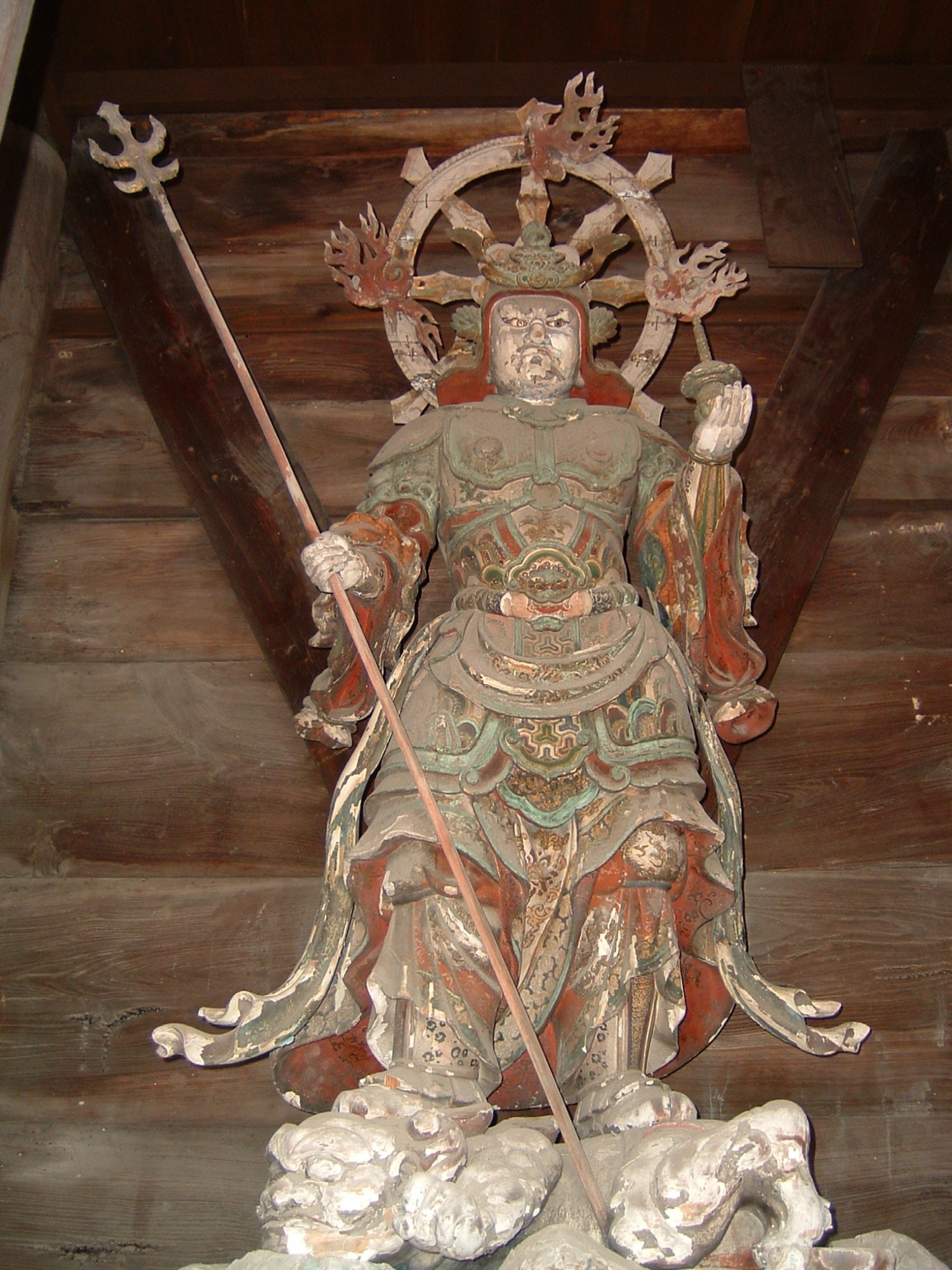
Tamon-ten (north)

== See also ==
- List of National Treasures of Japan (paintings)
