= Omoidaseru Koi o Shiyō =

- Theater Edition cover, featuring Yumiko Takino and Momoka Rissen

Single by STU48
- A-side: "Omoidaseru Koi o Shiyō" (full member and trainee versions)
- B-side: "Seishun Kakueki Teisha" (Type-A); "Ano Hi Kara Boku wa Kawatta" (Type-B); "Tanjitsu Shokubutsu" (Theater)
- Released: September 2, 2020
- Genre: J-pop
- Label: King Records
- Lyricist: Yasushi Akimoto
- Producer: Yasushi Akimoto

STU48 singles chronology
"Mubō na Yume wa Sameru Koto ga Nai" (2020)	"Omoidaseru Koi o Shiyō" (2020)	"Hitorigoto de Kataru Kurainara" (2021)

Music video
- "Omoidaseru Koi o Shiyō" on YouTube
- "Tanjitsu Shokubutsu" on YouTube

"Omoidaseru Koi o Shiyō" (Japanese: 思い出せる恋をしよう; lit. 'Let's Create a Memorable Love') is the fifth single by Japanese idol group STU48, released on September 2, 2020. Yumiko Takino and Momoka Rissen served as lead performers for the title song. The title song is the first one to feature the second generation trainees, who debuted in December 2019. It topped the Japanese music charts in its release week.

== Production and release ==
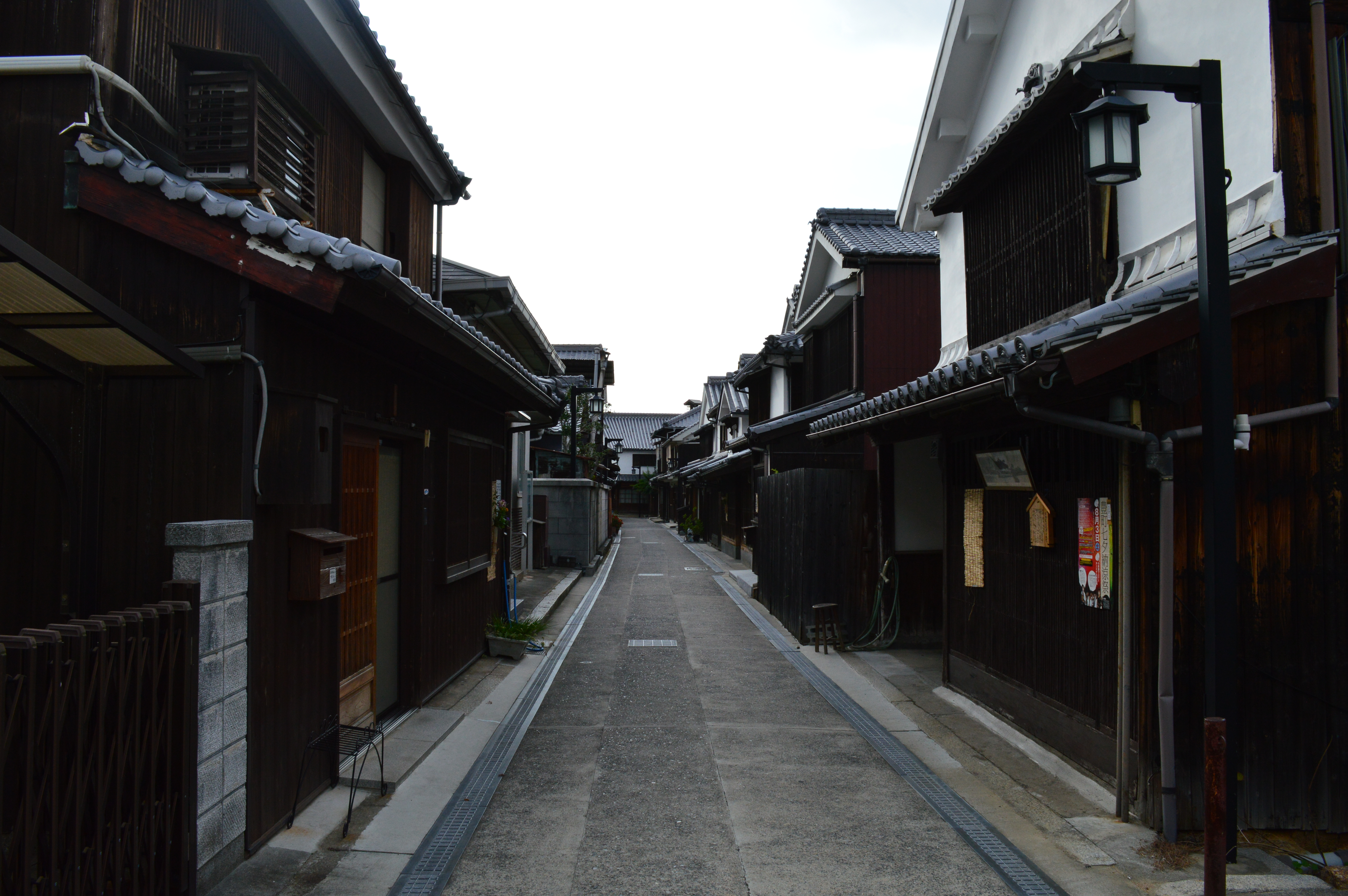
Mitarai Preservation District

The title song was released with two different lineups for all 21 full members, led by Yumiko Takino, and 23 trainees, led by Momoka Rissen. It is the first one in the AKB48 Group to have the music video produced in two versions, (Note: AKB48's "Sentimental Train" (2018) has a temporary "unfinished version" music video due to Jurina Matsui's health leave, which was superseded by the complete version after her return.) filmed at the Mitarai preservation district in Ōsakishimojima and representing the "past" and "present", in which the second generation trainees and the full members portrayed the high school and adult versions of the same group of people. The two music videos were included on the Limited Edition releases, while a combined version was published on YouTube on July 23.

The B-side "Tanjitsu Shokubutsu" (Note: 短日植物; lit. 'Short-day Plant') was performed by Fū Yabushita and Chiho Ishida (FūChiho), who also produced and edited the music video. "Seishun Kakueki Teisha" (Note: 青春各駅停車; lit. 'Local Train of Youth') is the first appearance on a single by the group's rock band subunit, Aoi Himawari, while "Ano Hi Kara Boku wa Kawatta" (Note: あの日から僕は変わった; lit. 'I've Changed Since That Day') was performed by the quartet of Takino, Kōko Tanaka, Yabushita, and Mai Nakamura.

The single was released in three editions and two Limited Editions. The Limited Editions included digital ballots to vote for the inclusion of members into a new subunit called the Setouchi PR Unit, which results were announced on October 18.

== Reception ==
"Omoidaseru Koi o Shiyō" sold 159,000 copies in its release week according to Billboard Japan, and placed first on both the Oricon Singles and Billboard Japan Hot 100 weekly charts.

== Track listing ==
=== CD ===
1. "Omoidaseru Koi o Shiyō" (1st Generation & 3rd Draft ver.) (思い出せる恋をしよう)
2. "Omoidaseru Koi o Shiyō" (2nd Generation ver.) (思い出せる恋をしよう)
3. Different tracks on each type:
  - Type A: "Seishun Kakueki Teisha" (青春各駅停車)
  - Type B: "Ano Hi Kara Boku wa Kawatta" (あの日から僕は変わった)
  - Theater: "Tanjitsu Shokubutsu" (短日植物)
4. "Omoidaseru Koi o Shiyō" (off-vocal)
5. Different instrumental tracks on each type:
  - Type A: "Seishun Kakueki Teisha" (off-vocal)
  - Type B: "Ano Hi Kara Boku wa Kawatta" (off-vocal)
  - Theater: "Tanjitsu Shokubutsu" (off-vocal)

=== DVD ===
1. Different on each type:
  - Type-A: "Omoidaseru Koi o Shiyō" Music Video (1st Generation & 3rd Draft ver.)
  - Type-B: "Omoidaseru Koi o Shiyō" Music Video (2nd Generation ver.)

== Personnel ==
=== "Omoidaseru Koi o Shiyō" (1st Generation & 3rd Draft ver.) ===
Center: Yumiko Takino

Chiho Ishida, Minami Ishida, Mitsuki Imamura, Hina Iwata, Marina Ōtani, Nana Okada, Cocoa Kai, Miyuna Kadowaki, Miyu Sakaki, Yumiko Takino, Kōko Tanaka, Mahina Taniguchi, Aoi Hyōdo, Akari Fukuda, Arisa Mineyoshi, Maiha Morishita, Honoka Yano, Fū Yabushita, Yuka Oki, Soraha Shinano, Mai Nakamura

=== "Omoidaseru Koi o Shiyō" (2nd Generation ver.) ===
Center: Momoka Rissen

Yura Ikeda, Miria Imaizumi, Rine Utsumi, Serika Ōsaki, Anna Kawamata, Yūna Kawamata, Riko Kudō, Aiko Kojima, Himeka Sako, Sara Shimizu, Ayaka Suzuki, Sayaka Takao, Reika Taguchi, Miho Tanaka, Natsuki Tamura, Yayoi Nakahiro, Sayaka Harada, Yurina Minami, Rika Muneyuki, Rinko Yoshizaki, Sara Yoshida, Momoka Rissen, Natsuki Watanabe

=== "Seishun Kakueki Teisha" ===
Center: Mitsuki Imamura

Mitsuki Imamura, Miyu Sakaki, Yumiko Takino, Aoi Hyōdo, Akari Fukuda

=== "Ano Hi Kara Boku wa Kawatta" ===
Center: Mai Nakamura

Yumiko Takino, Kōko Tanaka, Fū Yabushita, Mai Nakamura

=== "Tanjitsu Shokubutsu" ===
Chiho Ishida, Fū Yabushita
