= Mona Yamamoto =

Japanese television announcer and presenter

- 山本 モナ
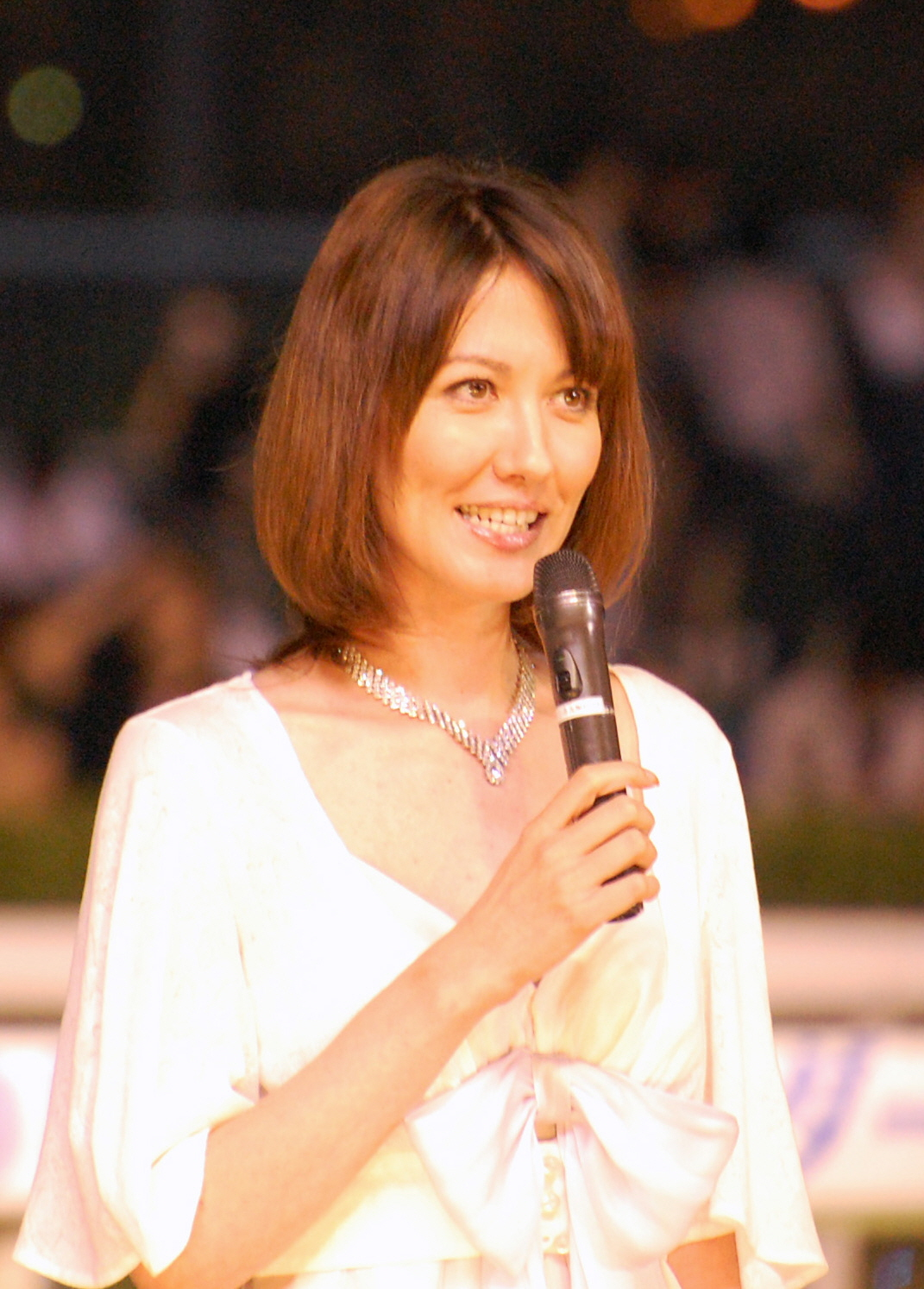
- Mona Yamamoto at Ohi Racecourse, on July 9, 2008
- Born: February 11, 1976 (age 50); Onomichi, Japan
- Occupation: Television host/presenter
- Years active: 2000–2011, 2013–present
- Notable work: Asahi Broadcasting Corporation, Fuji Television
- Children: 3

Mona Yamamoto (山本 モナ, Yamamoto Mona; born February 11, 1976, Onomichi, Hiroshima Prefecture, Japan) is a Japanese TV announcer and presenter. Her father is Norwegian and she became a naturalized Japanese citizen at the age of 6.

== Biography ==
After graduating from Gakushuin University, Mona joined the Asahi Broadcasting Corporation as an announcer. She presented the TV series Jackass in Japan. In September 2006 she worked for five days on the Tokyo Broadcasting System news program News23 before stepping down due to a love affair with married Democratic Party of Japan executive Goshi Hosono.

Returning to television in 2008 as an anchor for Fuji Television News, she lost her job after visiting a love hotel with married sportsman Tomohiro Nioka of the Yomiuri Giants baseball team.

In 2010 she married the president of a real estate investment company. She briefly returned to entertainment in 2011 before announcing her retirement from public life. In September 2012, she gave birth to her first child, a daughter.

However in March 2013, she returned to entertainment industry.
