= Nakata Museum =

Museum in Onomichi, Hiroshima Prefecture, Japan

- なかた美術館
- Interactive map of the Nakata Museum area

General information
- Location: 6-11 Shiomi-chō, Onomichi, Hiroshima Prefecture, Japan
- Coordinates: 34°24′33″N 133°11′13″E
- Opened: February 1997

Website
- Official website

Nakata Museum (なかた美術館, Nakata bijutsukan) opened in Onomichi, Hiroshima Prefecture, Japan, in 1997. The collection includes works by Corot, Renoir, Cézanne, Kobayashi Wasaku (小林和作), and Umehara Ryūzaburō.

== See also ==
- Onomichi City Museum of Art
- List of Cultural Properties of Japan - paintings (Hiroshima)
