= Onomichi FM =

FM Onomichi 79
- Japan
- Broadcast area: Onomichi/ Fukuyama/ Mihara
- Frequency: 79.4 MHz
- Branding: "JOZZ8AF-FM"

Programming
- Format: news, talk, music

History
- First air date: June 1, 1999
- Call sign meaning: Onomichi FM

Technical information
- ERP: 20 watts

Links
- Website: FM Onomichi 79.4

Onomichi FM (JOZZ8AF-FM 79.4 MHz) is a Japanese community FM radio station in Onomichi, Hiroshima Prefecture, Japan.

The station was founded on April 19, 1999 and went on the air on June 1, 1999.
