= Bokuyō Katayama =

Japanese painter

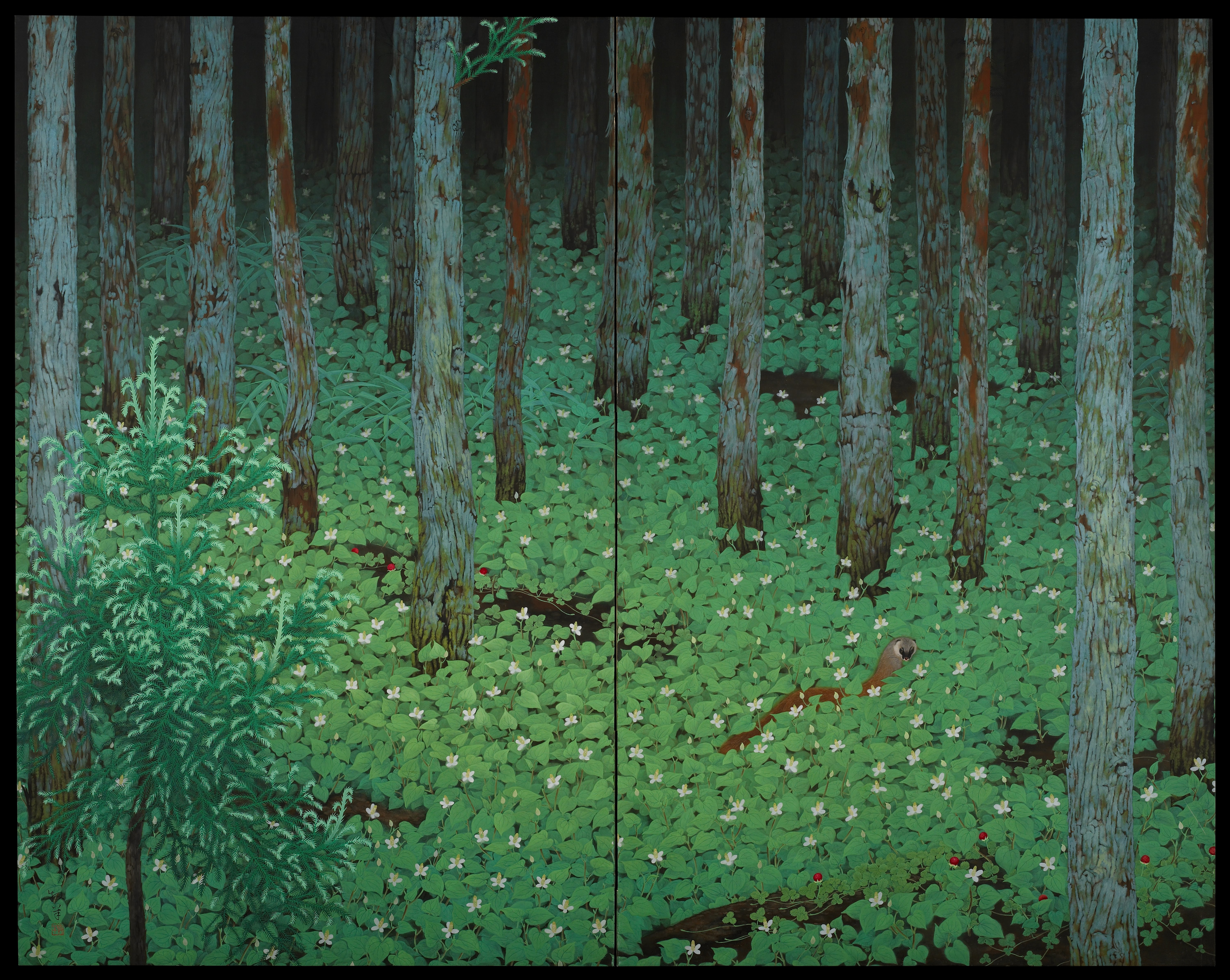
The Forest (1928)

Bokuyō Katayama (Japanese: 片山牧羊, Hepburn: Katayama Bokuyō; born 1900, died 26 August 1937) was a Japanese painter of the nihonga style active in the Shōwa era. Bokuyō claimed Yugen as the keyword of his art, and used traditional materials such as silk, ink and mineral pigments to draw traditional subjects of Japanese art with influence of Western painting.

== Life ==
Bokuyō Katayama was born in Nagae Town in Onomichi in 1900 (Meiji 33) as Kenzō Katayama (Bokuyō was his art name). His father, Tatsunosuke Katayama, was a scholar of Chinese language. Starting from 1915, he studied nanga in Osaka and calligraphy under Sunzu Aikawa. Since 1917, he studied Japanese painting under Tsurutomo Shoda in Kyoto. He also learned calligraphy from Toyama Yamamoto. Around this time, he created a tanka collection 曼珠華沙. Bokuyō moved to Tokyo in 1921, where he began to study Japanese painting in earnest under Tsutaya Ryuko.

In 1927, his "Oboro" (currently in collection of Hiroshima Prefectural Art Museum) was awarded the grand prize (tokusen) at Japan's 8th annual Imperial Juried Exhibition (Teiten), ran by Imperial Fine Arts Academy. The next year, at 9th Exhibition, he showcased "The Forest" (currently in collection of Minneapolis Institute of Art), which awarded him the status of mukansa, (literally "non-vetted"), meaning that any work he would submit to the next exhibitions would be automatically included. In 1929, he showcased Gyoson Shunrai (漁村春懶, currently in collection of Fukuyama Museum of Art). In this year, Yoshitaka Yanagi became his student. In 1930, he submitted Loneliness (破寂) to the 11th Teiten. In 1931, Yanagi changed his field to textile art and left Bokuyō's tutelage. His place was taken by Hideo Shiode who moved to Tokyo from Fukuyama to study painting. In 1931, Bokuyō submitted Kagerou (かげろう) to the 12th Teiten. It was his last exhibition, with his career being cut short there by an illness. In 1932, he returned to his wife's parents' home in Fukuyama, Hiroshima. In 1935, he traveled to Saipan, and returned to Japan in the same year. He died because of his illness on August 26, 1937.

== Gallery ==
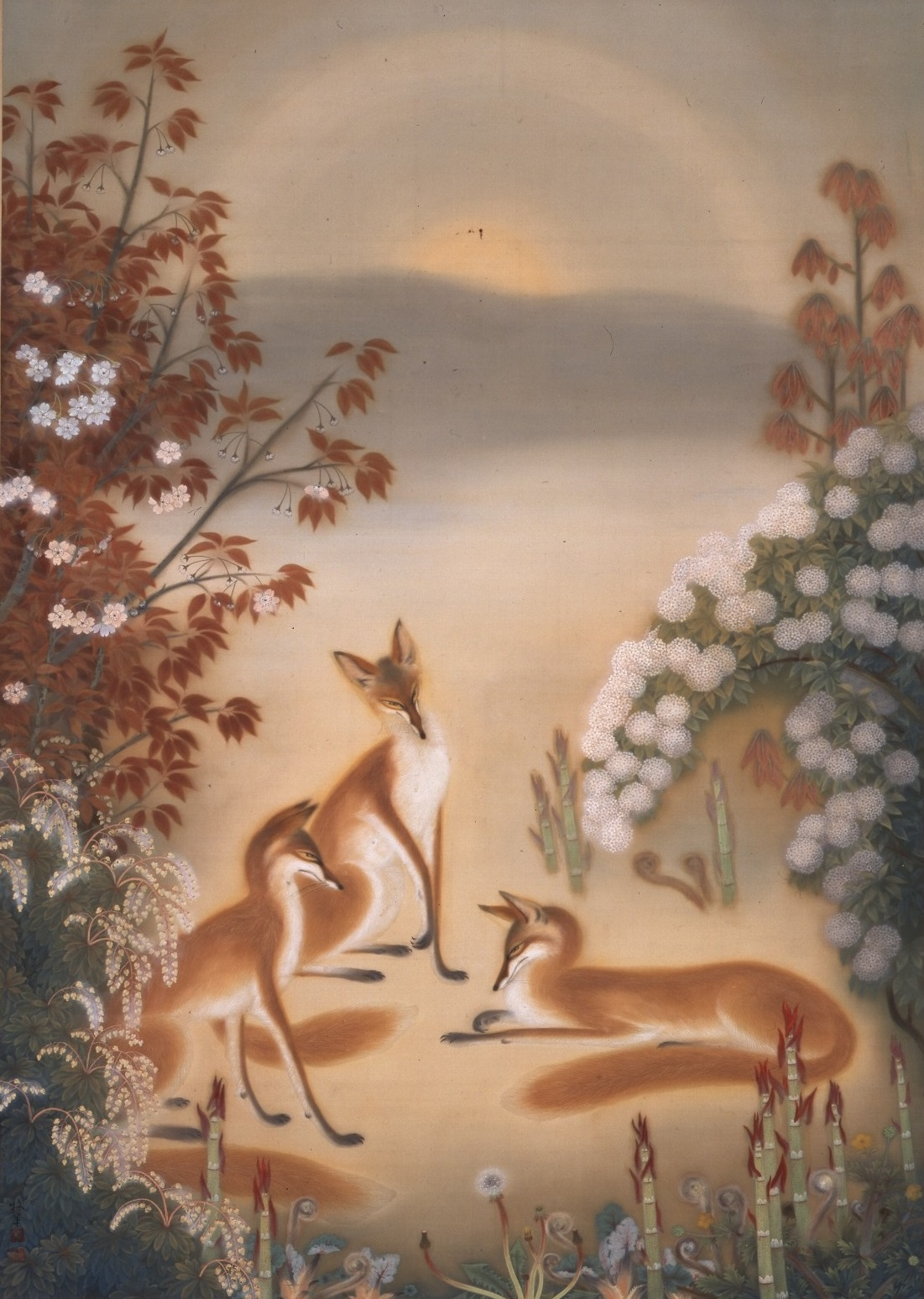
Oboro (1927)

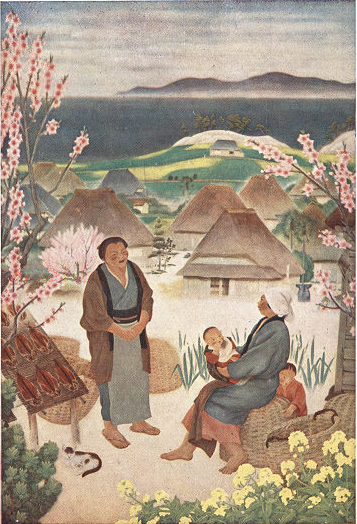
Gyoson Shunrai (1929)

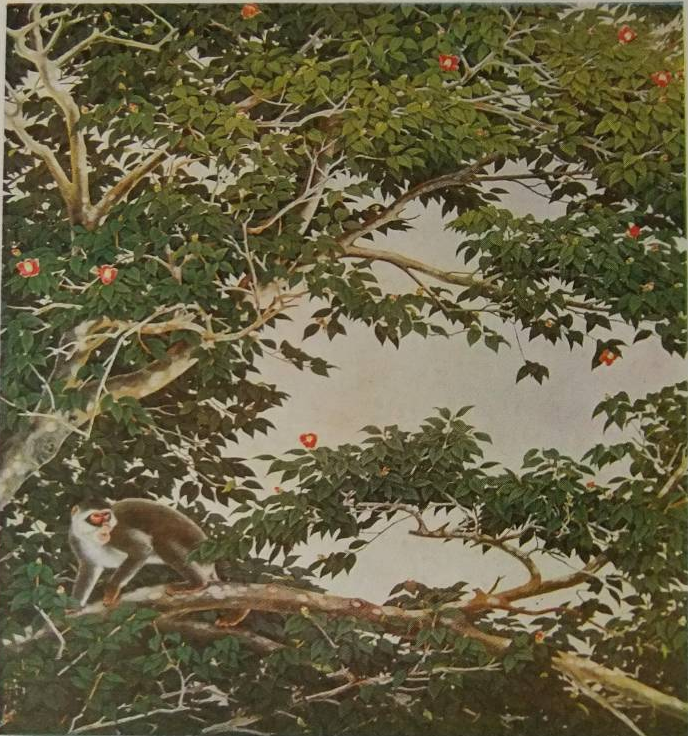
Loneliness (1930)

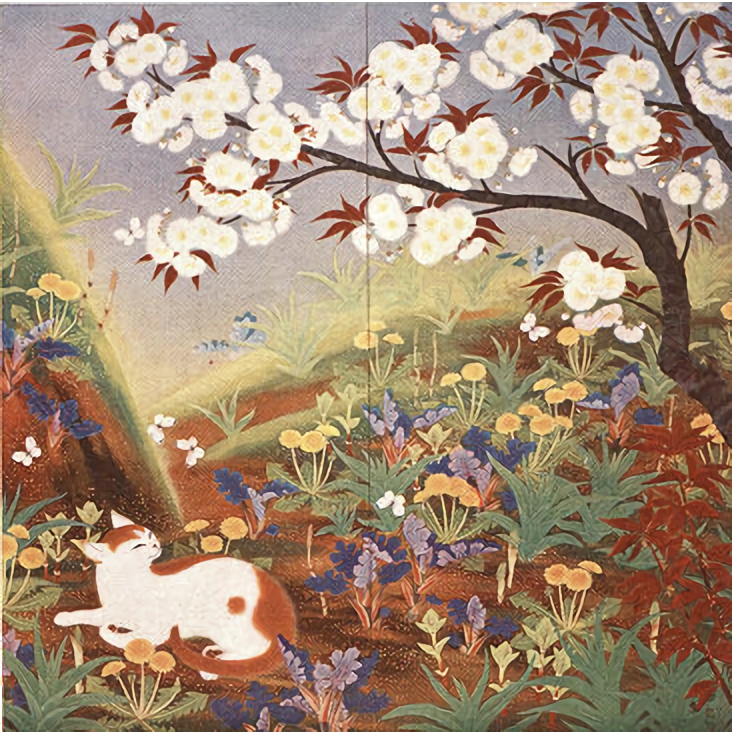
Kagerou (1931)
