= Onomichi City University =

Coordinates: 34°25′28″N 133°09′41″E

- 尾道市立大学
- Type: Public
- Established: Founded 1946; Chartered 2001
- President: Hidekazu Adachi
- Faculty: 57 full-time
- Students: 1,400
- Undergraduates: 1,358
- Postgraduates: 42
- Location: Onomichi, Hiroshima, Japan
- Campus: Suburb
- Website: www.onomichi-u.ac.jp

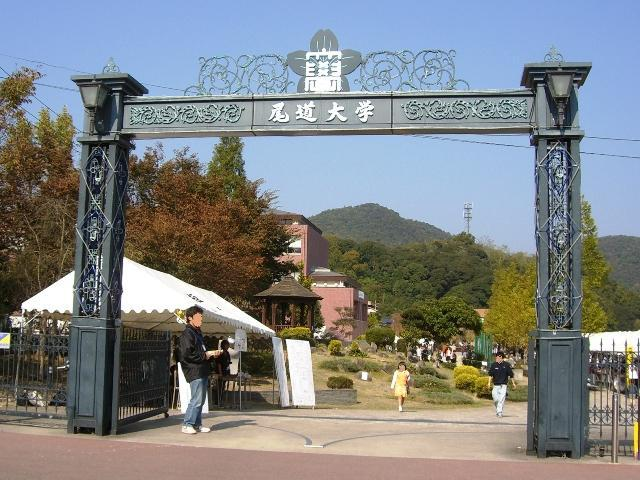
The main gate

Onomichi City University (尾道市立大学, Onomichi shiritsu daigaku) is a municipal university in Japan. It is located in Hisayamada-cho, Onomichi City, Hiroshima Prefecture.

== History ==
The university was founded in 1946 as Onomichi Municipal Women's College (尾道市立女子専門学校, Onomichi shiritsu joshi semmon gakkō), a three-year college for ages 17–20 or above. In 1950 the school was developed into Onomichi Junior College (尾道短期大学, Onomichi tanki daigaku), a co-educational college, under Japan's new educational system.

At first the junior college had one department: the Department of Japanese Literature. In 1951 the Department of Economics was added. In 1962 it was removed to the present campus. In 1988 the Department of Business Administration and Information Science was added.

In 2001 the junior college was developed into Onomichi University, a four-year university with two faculties: the Faculty of Economics, Management & Information Science and the Faculty of Artistic Culture. In 2005 the Graduate Schools were added (Master's courses only). In April 2012 the university was incorporated as a public university corporation and renamed Onomichi City University.

== Organization ==
=== Undergraduate schools ===
- Faculty of Economics, Management & Information Science
- Faculty of Art and Culture
  - Department of Japanese Literature
  - Department of Art & Design

=== Graduate schools ===
- Graduate School of Economics, Management & Information Science (Master's courses only)
- Graduate School of Japanese Literature (Master's courses only)
- Graduate School of Art & Design (Master's courses only)

=== Institutes ===
- Library
- Center for Cooperative R&D
- Onomichi Shirakaba Museum of Art
