= Mubō na Yume wa Sameru Koto ga Nai =

- Theater edition cover

Single by STU48
- B-side: "Isshun no Thrill" (Type-A); "Bokura no Shunkashūtō" (Type-B); "Setouchi no Imōto" (Type-C); "Kiseki to Iu Na no Story" (Theater)
- Released: January 29, 2020
- Genre: J-pop
- Label: King Records
- Lyricist: Yasushi Akimoto
- Producer: Yasushi Akimoto

STU48 singles chronology
"Daisuki na Hito" (2019)	"Mubō na Yume wa Sameru Koto ga Nai" (2020)	"Omoidaseru Koi o Shiyō" (2020)

Music video
- "Mubō na Yume wa Sameru Koto ga Nai" on YouTube

"Mubō na Yume wa Sameru Koto ga Nai" (Japanese: 無謀な夢は覚めることがない; lit. 'Reckless Dreams Never Wake Up') is the third single by Japanese idol group STU48, released on January 29, 2020. Yumiko Takino served as lead performer for the title song. It topped the Japanese music charts in its release week.

== Production and release ==
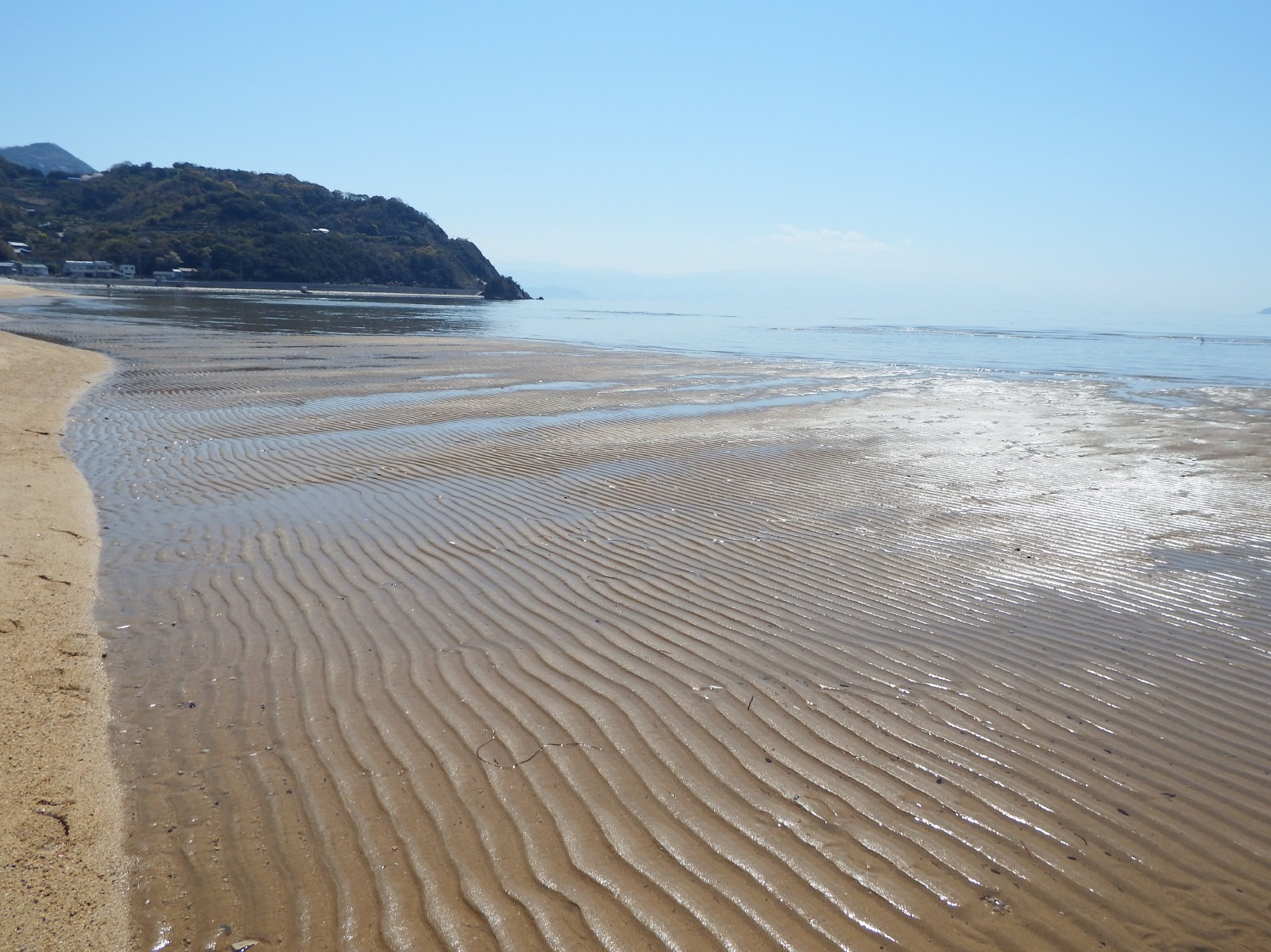
Chichibugahama

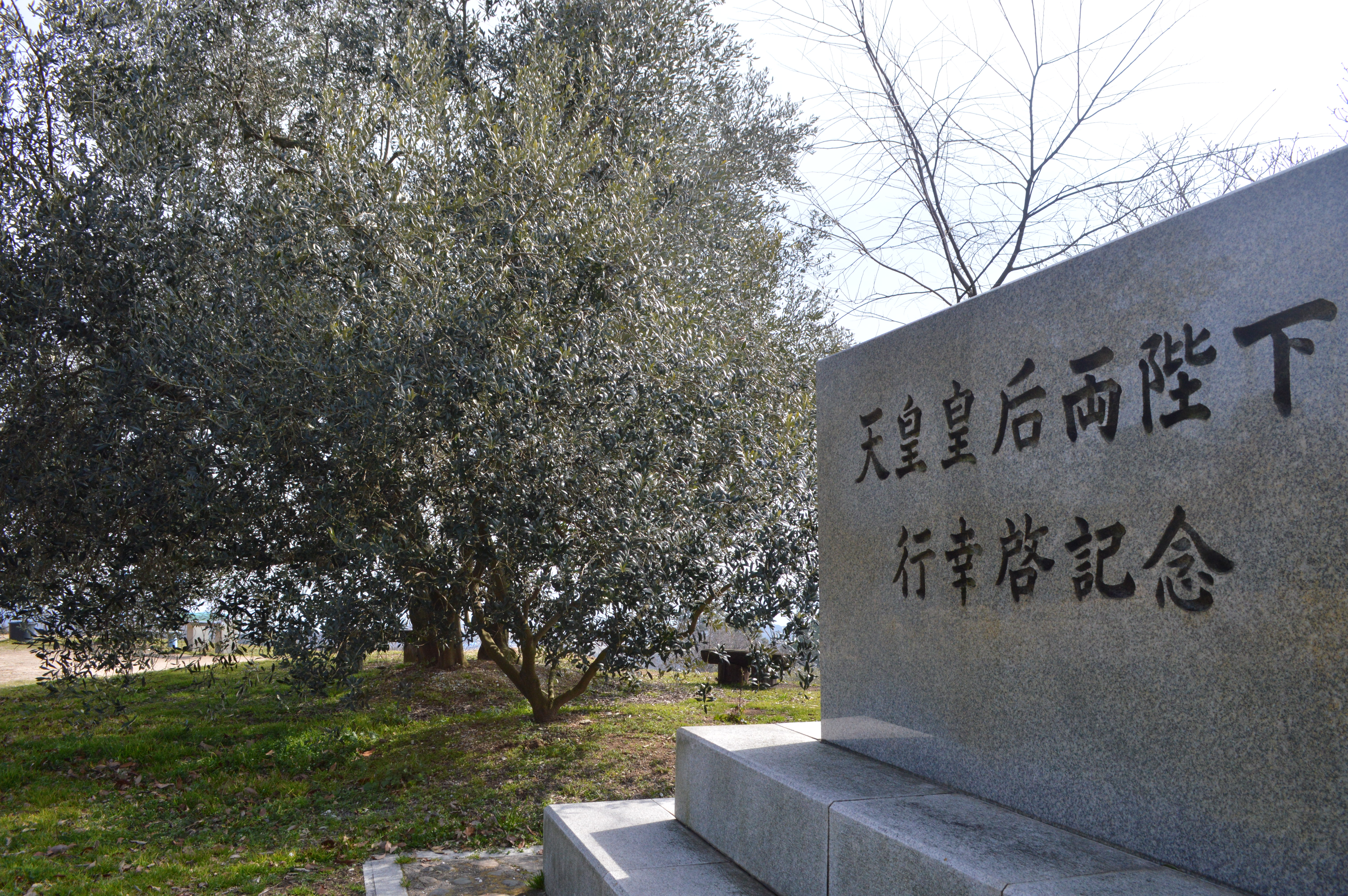
Ushimado Olive Land

The title song music video was recorded at the Chichibugahama beach in Kagawa Prefecture, also known as the "Seto Inland Sea Sky Mirror", (Note: 瀬戸内海の天空の鏡, Setonaikai no tenkū no kagami) and Ushimado Olive Land in Okayama Prefecture. It features the group's most intense dance routine at the time, choreographed by Tomohiko Tsujimoto, who had previously worked with the group on "Kaze wo Matsu". The song was performed live for the first time during the STU48 concert at the Tokyo Dome City Hall on January 18, 2020.

The single was released in four editions, seven including Limited Editions. B-side "Bokura no Shunkashūtō" (Note: 僕らの春夏秋冬; transl. Our Four Seasons) is the first appearance in a single of the group's second generation trainees, who debuted in December 2019. "Setouchi no Imōto" (Note: 瀬戸内の妹; lit. 'Setouchi's Little Sister') was the theme song for a commercial for Hiroshima Telecasting's Bridal Information Center and performed by members who appeared in the ad. "Kiseki to iu Na no Story" (Note: 奇跡という名のストーリー; lit. 'A Story Named Miracle') was created for the group's second original stage set list "Bokutachi no Koi no Yokan" and performed by all full members (excluding trainees).

== Reception ==
"Mubō na Yume wa Sameru Koto ga Nai" sold 333,000 copies in its release week according to Billboard Japan and placed first on both the Oricon Singles and Billboard Japan Hot 100 charts.

== Track listing ==
=== CD ===
1. "Mubō na Yume wa Sameru Koto ga Nai" (無謀な夢は覚めることがない)
2. Different tracks on each type:
  - Type A: "Isshun no Thrill" (一瞬のスリル)
  - Type B: "Bokura no Shunkashūtō" (僕らの春夏秋冬)
  - Type C: "Setouchi no Imōto" (瀬戸内の妹)
  - Theater: "Kiseki to Iu Na no Story" (奇跡という名のストーリー)
3. "Mubō na Yume wa Sameru Koto ga Nai" (off-vocal)
4. Different instrumental tracks on each type:
  - Type A: "Isshun no Thrill" (off-vocal)
  - Type B: "Bokura no Shunkashūtō" (off-vocal)
  - Type C: "Setouchi no Imōto" (off-vocal)
  - Theater: "Kiseki to Iu Na no Story" (off-vocal)

=== DVD ===
1. "Mubō na Yume wa Sameru Koto ga Nai" Music Video

== Personnel ==
=== "Mubō na Yume wa Sameru Koto ga Nai" ===
Center: Yumiko Takino

Chiho Ishida, Minami Ishida, Mitsuki Imamura, Hina Iwata, Nana Okada, Marina Ōtani, Cocoa Kai, Miyuna Kadowaki, Nonoka Shintani, Yumiko Takino, Kōko Tanaka, Akari Fukuda, Honoka Yano, Fu Yabushita, Yuka Oki, Mai Nakamura

=== "Isshun no Thrill" ===
Center: Kanon Isogai

Kanon Isogai, Miyu Sakaki, Mahina Taniguchi, Aoi Hyōdo, Azusa Fujiwara, Arisa Mineyoshi, Maiha Morishita, Soraha Shinano

=== "Bokura no Shunkashūtō" ===
Center: Momoka Rissen

Yura Ikeda, Miria Imaizumi, Rine Utsumi, Serika Ōsaki, Anna Kawamata, Yūna Kawamata, Riko Kudō, Aiko Kojima, Arisu Kondō, Himeka Sako, Sara Shimizu, Ayaka Suzuki, Sayaka Takao, Reika Taguchi, Miho Tanaka, Natsuki Tamura, Yayoi Nakahiro, Sayaka Harada, Yurina Minami, Rika Muneyuki, Rinko Yoshizaki, Sara Yoshida, Momoka Rissen, Natsuki Watanabe

=== "Setouchi no Imōto" ===
Center: Mitsuki Imamura

Minami Ishida, Mitsuki Imamura, Yumiko Takino, Kōko Tanaka, Akari Fukuda, Yuka Oki, Mai Nakamura

=== "Kiseki to Iu Na no Story" ===
Center: Yumiko Takino

Chiho Ishida, Minami Ishida, Kanon Isogai, Mitsuki Imamura, Hina Iwata, Marina Ōtani, Cocoa Kai, Miyuna Kadowaki, Yumiko Takino, Kōko Tanaka, Akari Fukuda, Honoka Yano, Fu Yabushita, Yuka Oki, Soraha Shinano, Mai Nakamura
