= Isao Kiso =

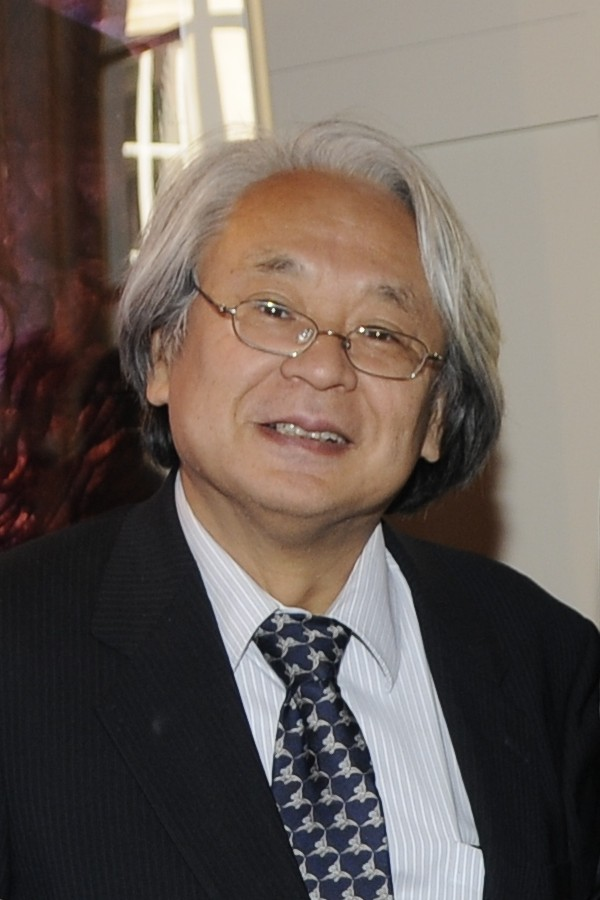
2011

Isao Kiso (木曽 功, Isao Kiso; born 11 February 1952) is a Special Advisor to the Cabinet and a former official of the Ministry of Education, Culture, Sports, Science and Technology in Japan. He has held positions as the Director of Cultural Properties Department at the Agency for Cultural Affairs, the Head of Minister's Secretariat International Affairs Division at the Ministry of Education, Culture, Sports, Science and Technology, and the Ambassador Extraordinary and Plenipotentiary of Japan, Permanent Delegate to UNESCO.

== Early life and education ==
He was born in Onomichi, Hiroshima Prefecture in 1952, and moved to Fukuyama, another city in Hiroshima Prefecture, in 1959. After graduating from Fukuyama Junior and Senior High School Attached to Hiroshima University in 1970, he entered the University of Tokyo in 1971, where he graduated in 1975 with a bachelor's degree in law. The following year, he started his career at the Ministry of Education, Sports, Science and Culture.

== Career highlights ==
- May 1981 Graduated from Yale University School of Management
- February 1987 Appointed First Secretary at the Embassy of Japan in France
- 2003 Received Chevalier, Ordre des Palmes Académiques of France
- July 2007 Appointed Head of Minister's Secretariat International Affairs Division, Ministry of Education, Japan
- August 2010 Appointed Ambassador Extraordinary and Plenipotentiary of Japan, Permanent Delegate to UNESCO (retired November 2013)
- April 2014 Special Advisor to the Cabinet of Japan
