= Senkō-ji (Onomichi) =

Buddhist temple in Onomichi, Japan

Coordinates: 34°24′39″N 133°11′56″E

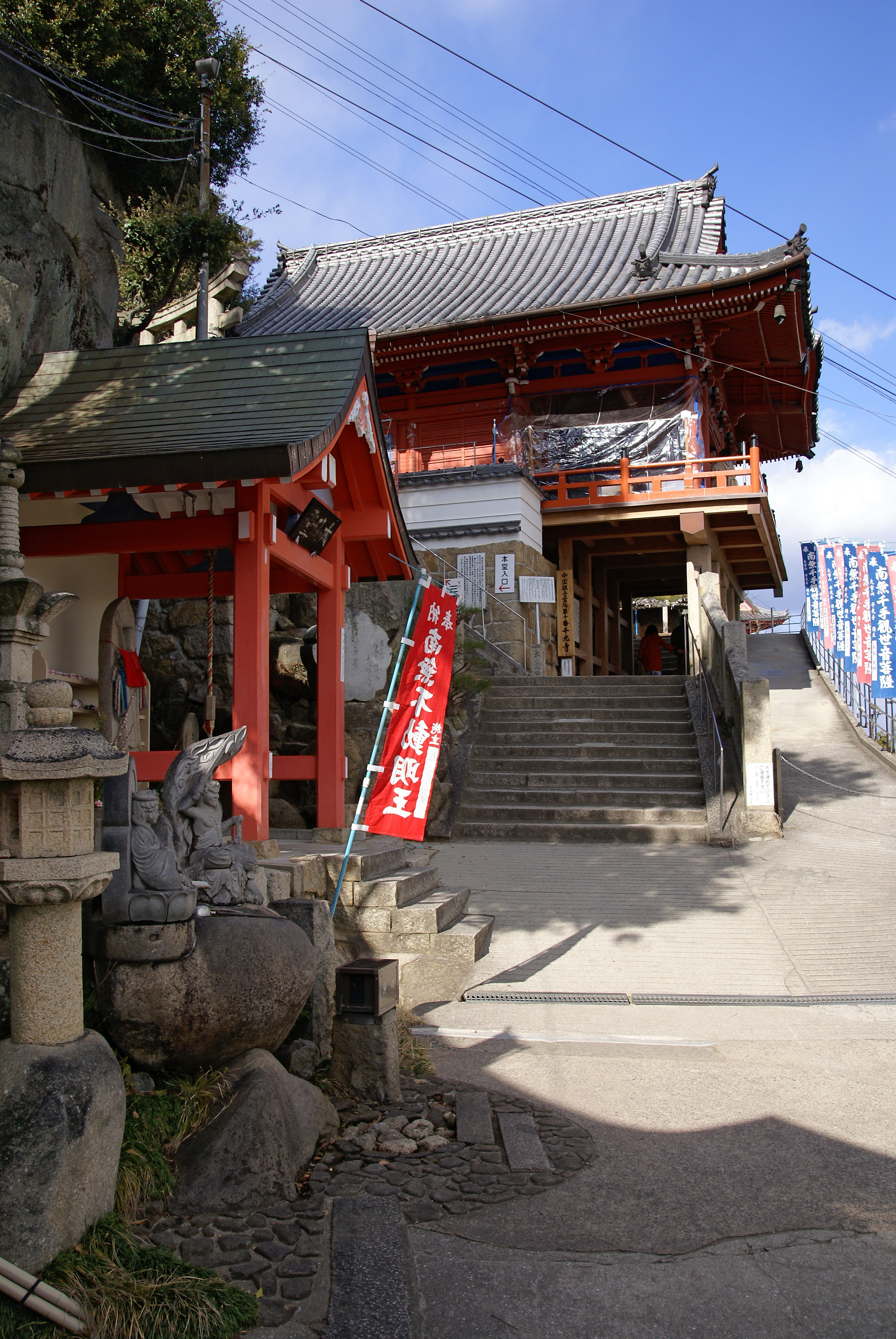

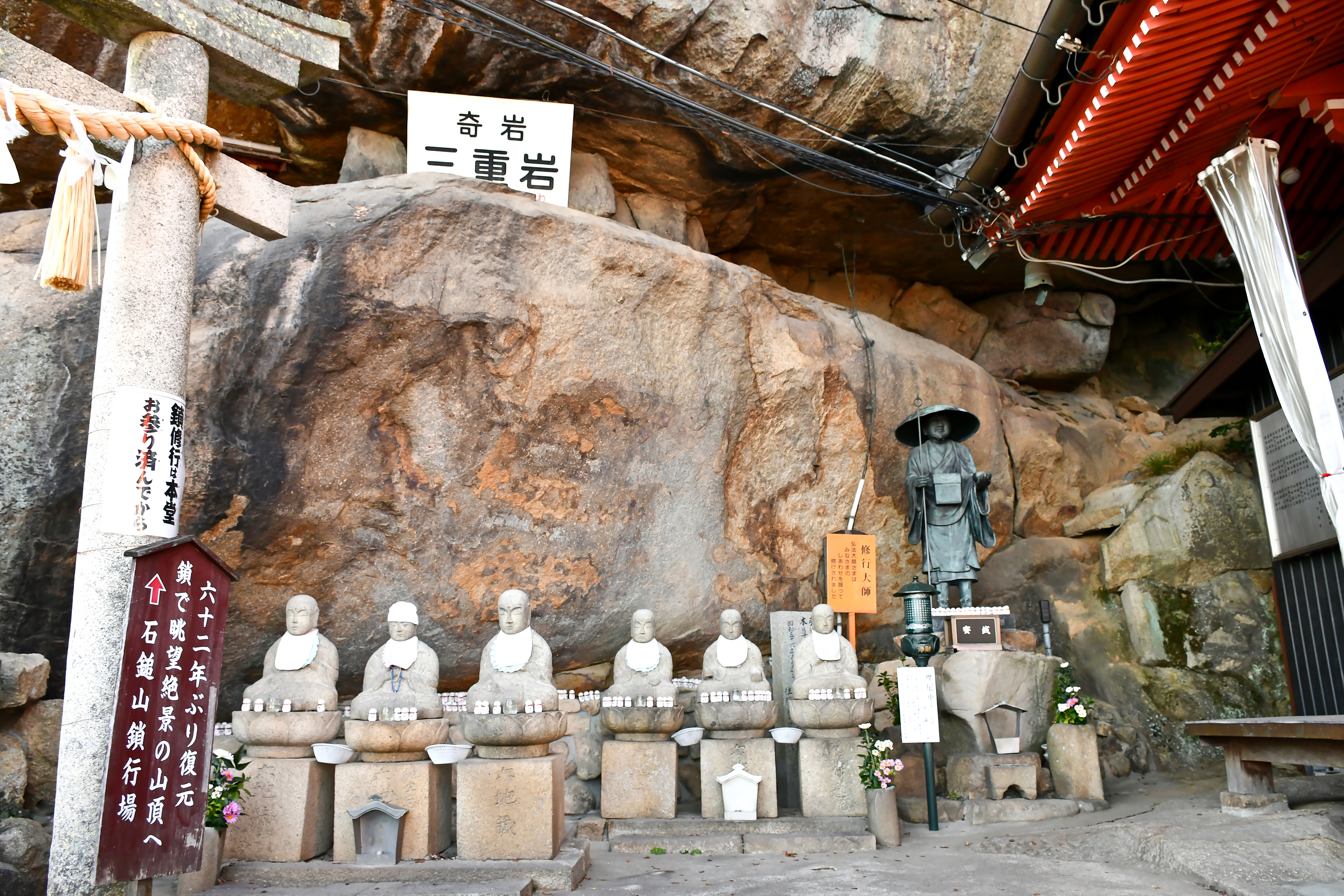
Stone Jizō statues beside main temple complex.

Senkō-ji (千光寺) is a historic Japanese temple in Senko-ji Park in Onomichi, Hiroshima, Japan.

== History ==
Senkō-ji was founded in the year 806, the 1st year of the Daidō era.

Senkō-ji is the 10th site of the Chūgoku 33 Kannon Pilgrimage.

== Attractions ==
From Senkō-ji, visitors can view the downtown of Onomichi and the Seto Inland Sea.

There is a Bungaku no komichi (文学のこみち(Path of Literature)) about 25 authors related to Onomichi, including Shiga Naoya and Fumiko Hayashi.

== In popular culture ==
The temple was featured as major landmark in the video game, Yakuza 6: The Song of Life.

== See also ==
- Senkōji Ropeway
- Chūgoku 33 Kannon Pilgrimage
- Shiga Naoya
- Fumiko Hayashi
