= Onomichi =

Onomichi 尾道市
- City
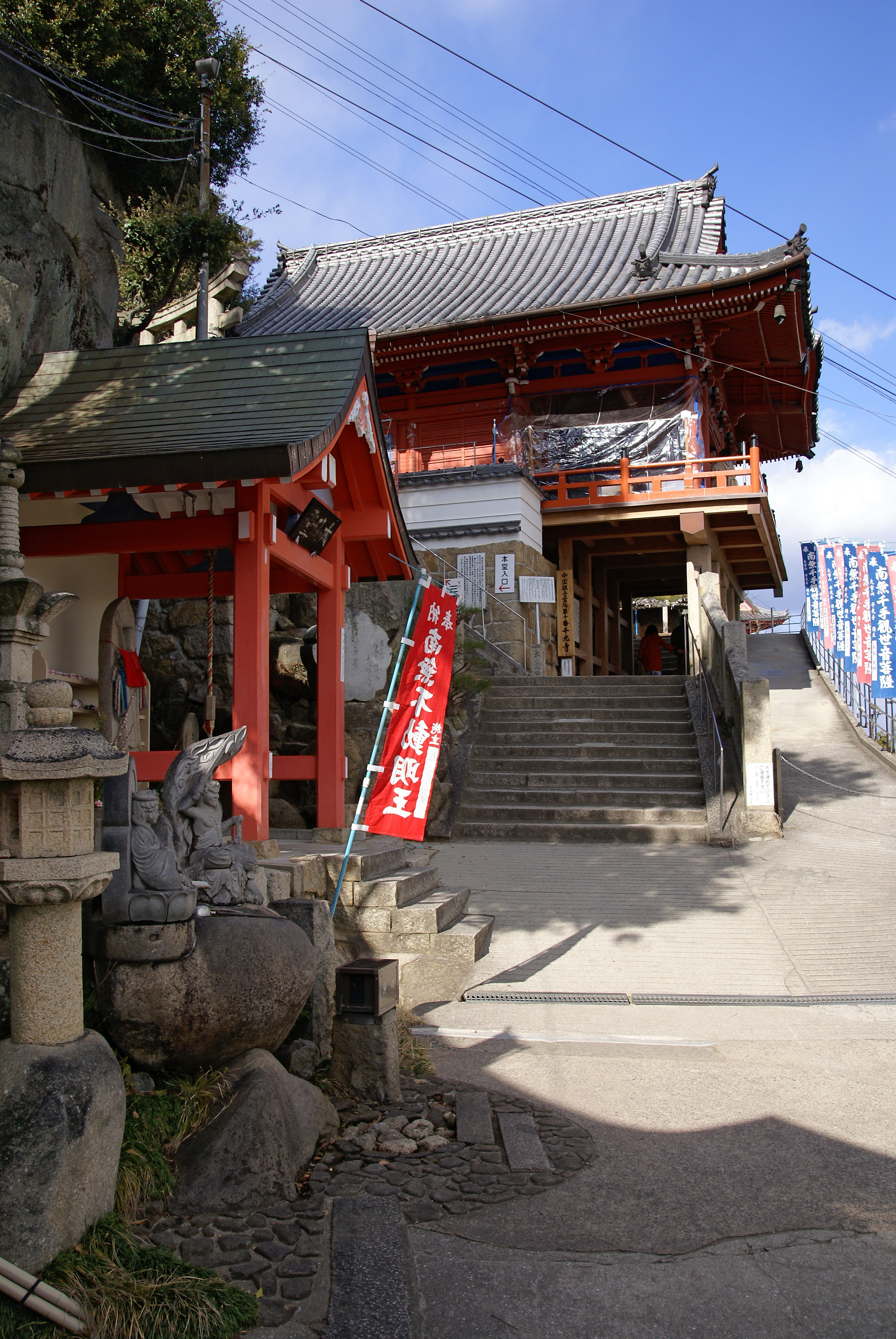

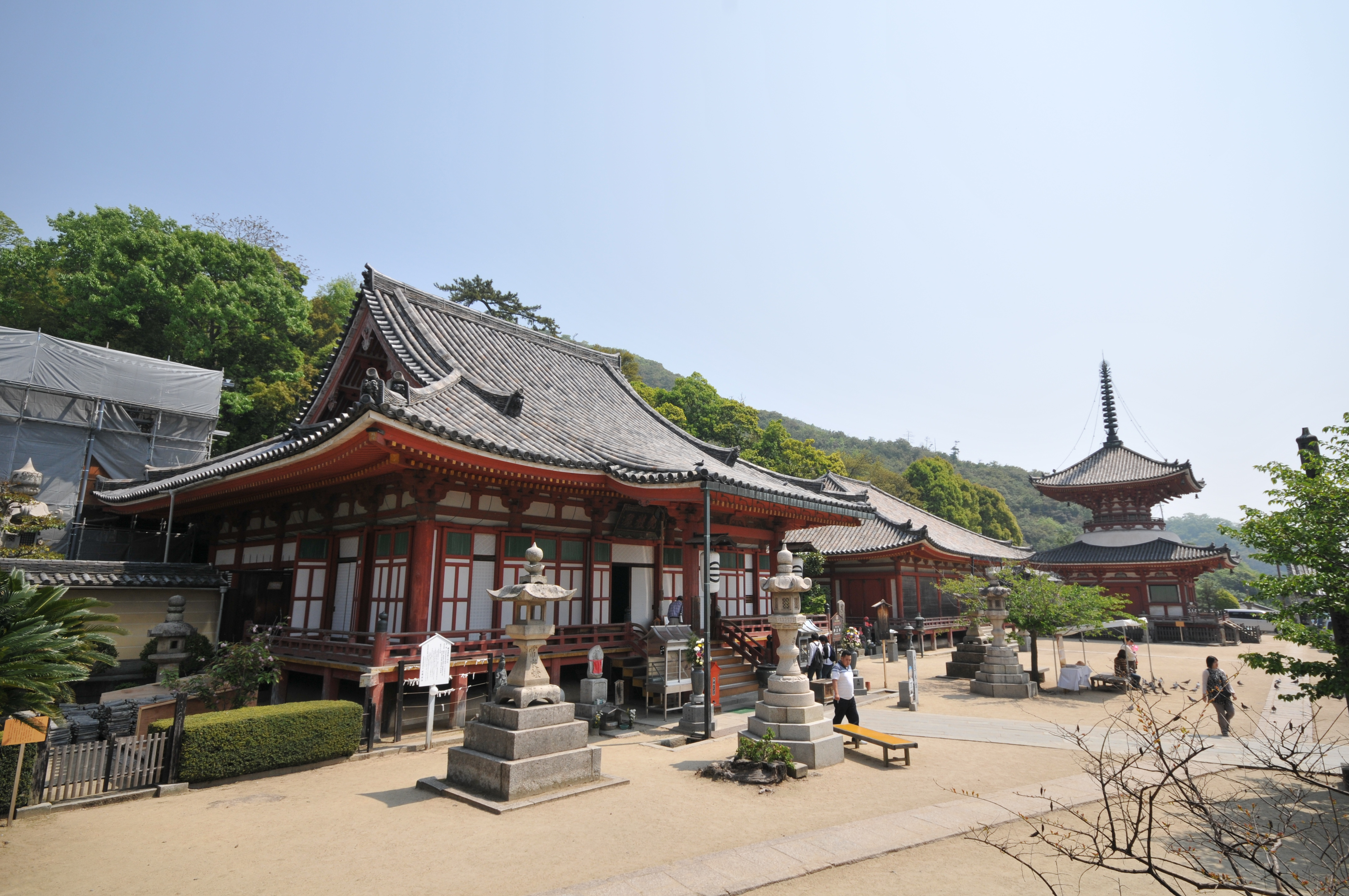

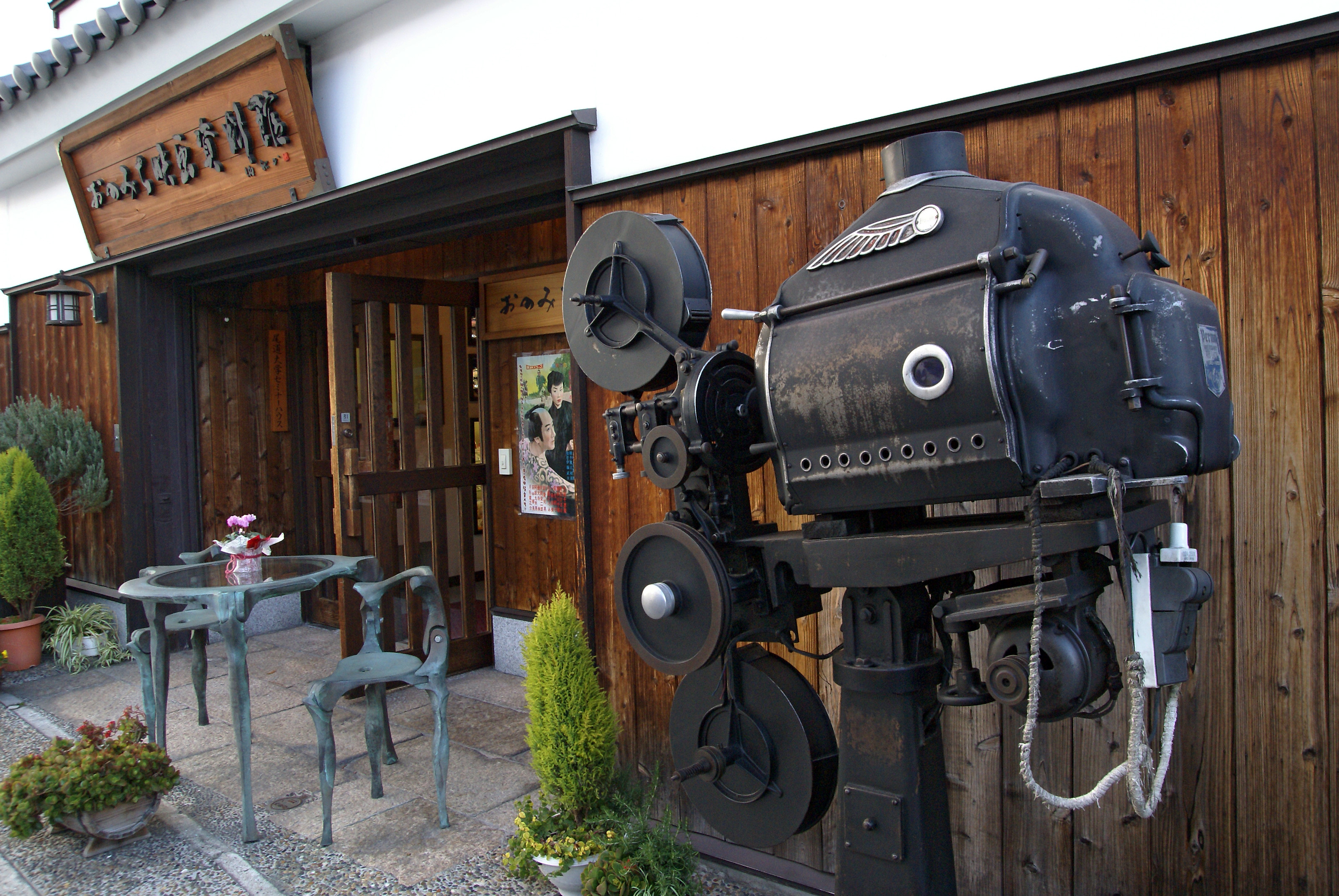

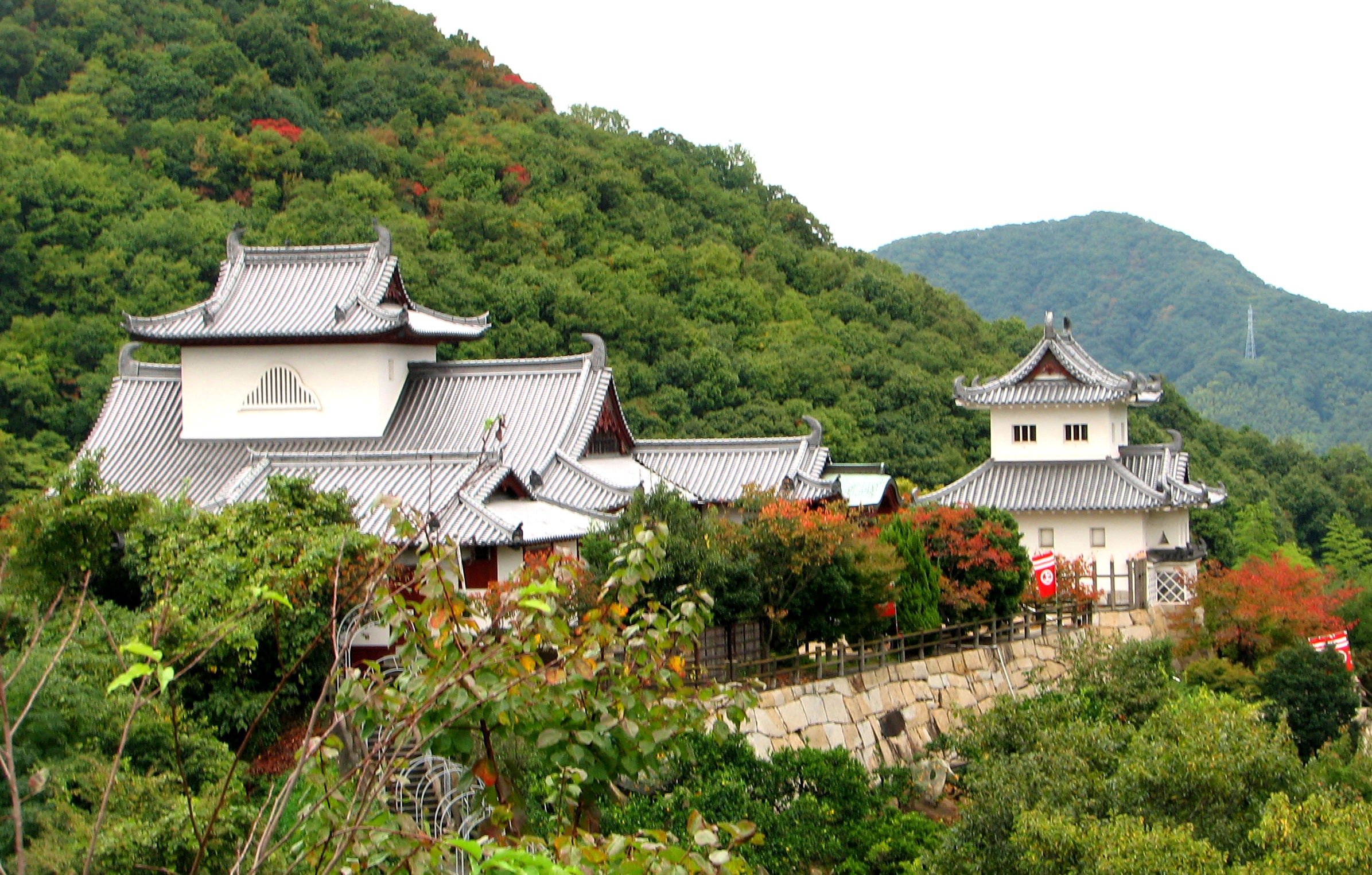

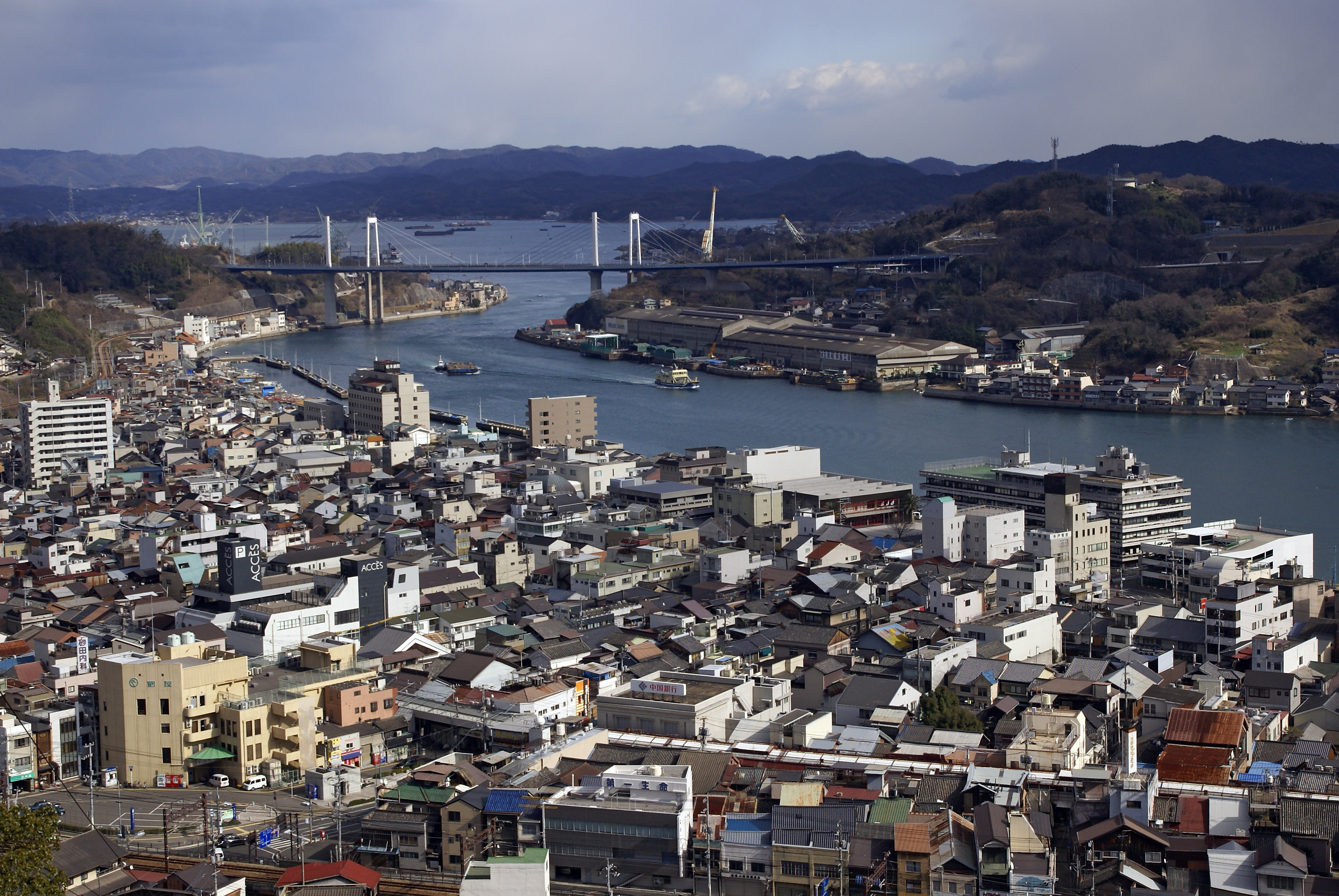
Senkō-ji	Jōdo-ji
Onomichi Movie Museum	Innoshima Castle
Onomichi Panorama
- Flag Seal
- Location of Onomichi in Hiroshima Prefecture

- Location in Japan
- Coordinates: 34°25′N 133°12′E
- Country: Japan
- Region: Chūgoku (San'yō)
- Prefecture: Hiroshima Prefecture

Government
  - Mayor: Yuko Hiratani

Area
  - Total: 285.11 km^{2} (110.08 sq mi)

Population (March 31, 2023)
  - Total: 129,314
  - Density: 453.56/km^{2} (1,174.7/sq mi)
- Time zone: UTC+09:00 (JST)
- City hall address: 1-15-1 Kubo, Onomichi-shi, Hiroshima-ken 722-8501
- Climate: Cfa
- Website: www.city.onomichi.hiroshima.jp
- Symbols
- Flower: Sakura
- Tree: Sakura

Onomichi (尾道市, Onomichi-shi; Japanese pronunciation: [ò̞.nó̞.mʲì.c̟͡ɕì, -mʲí.c̟͡ɕi̥.ɕì]) is a city located in Hiroshima Prefecture, Japan.

As of 31 January 2023, the city had an estimated population of 129,314 in 64055 households and a population density of 450 people per km^{2}. The total area of the city is 285.11 square kilometers (110.08 sq mi).

== Geography ==
Onomichi is located in southeastern Hiroshima Prefecture. It faces the Seto Inland Sea to the south, and the coastline is intricate and forms part of the Setonaikai National Park. The main urban concentration is in a narrow band on the coast, where there is very little flat land. Because of its unique scenery, it is often used as a filming location for movies.

=== Adjoining municipalities ===
Hiroshima Prefecture

- Fuchū
- Fukuyama
- Mihara
- Sera

=== Climate ===
Onomichi has a humid subtropical climate (Köppen climate classification Cfa) characterized by cool to mild winters and hot, humid summers. The average annual temperature in Onomichi is 15.9 °C (60.6 °F). The average annual rainfall is 1,138.4 mm (44.82 in) with July as the wettest month. The temperatures are highest on average in August, at around 27.5 °C (81.5 °F), and lowest in January, at around 5.7 °C (42.3 °F). The highest temperature ever recorded in Onomichi was 37.8 °C (100.0 °F) on August 15, 2024; the coldest temperature ever recorded was −6.3 °C (20.7 °F) on 26 February 1981.

Climate data for Ikuchi-jima, Onomichi (1991−2020 normals, extremes 1979−present)
Month	Jan	Feb	Mar	Apr	May	Jun	Jul	Aug	Sep	Oct	Nov	Dec	Year
Record high °C (°F)	16.4 (61.5)	20.4 (68.7)	23.4 (74.1)	27.5 (81.5)	32.0 (89.6)	34.2 (93.6)	36.0 (96.8)	37.8 (100.0)	36.0 (96.8)	33.0 (91.4)	25.1 (77.2)	20.9 (69.6)	37.8 (100.0)
Mean daily maximum °C (°F)	9.5 (49.1)	9.9 (49.8)	13.0 (55.4)	18.1 (64.6)	22.9 (73.2)	26.0 (78.8)	30.0 (86.0)	31.9 (89.4)	28.3 (82.9)	22.8 (73.0)	17.2 (63.0)	11.9 (53.4)	20.1 (68.2)
Daily mean °C (°F)	5.7 (42.3)	5.8 (42.4)	8.6 (47.5)	13.4 (56.1)	18.1 (64.6)	21.8 (71.2)	25.9 (78.6)	27.5 (81.5)	24.1 (75.4)	18.6 (65.5)	12.9 (55.2)	8.0 (46.4)	15.9 (60.6)
Mean daily minimum °C (°F)	1.6 (34.9)	1.3 (34.3)	3.8 (38.8)	8.5 (47.3)	13.4 (56.1)	18.2 (64.8)	22.5 (72.5)	24.0 (75.2)	20.6 (69.1)	14.6 (58.3)	8.7 (47.7)	3.8 (38.8)	11.8 (53.2)
Record low °C (°F)	−4.7 (23.5)	−6.3 (20.7)	−4.0 (24.8)	−1.2 (29.8)	3.4 (38.1)	9.8 (49.6)	15.6 (60.1)	17.4 (63.3)	11.4 (52.5)	4.7 (40.5)	−0.6 (30.9)	−3.0 (26.6)	−6.3 (20.7)
Average precipitation mm (inches)	39.5 (1.56)	49.7 (1.96)	84.4 (3.32)	88.9 (3.50)	108.3 (4.26)	172.3 (6.78)	177.6 (6.99)	89.5 (3.52)	126.8 (4.99)	95.9 (3.78)	59.2 (2.33)	46.2 (1.82)	1,138.4 (44.82)
Average precipitation days (≥ 1.0 mm)	5.3	6.9	9.2	9.1	8.5	10.8	9.1	6.2	8.5	7.0	6.2	6.3	93.1
Mean monthly sunshine hours	141.9	140.1	177.0	192.1	206.5	149.7	189.9	220.7	163.7	169.8	146.2	140.8	2,047.1
Source: Japan Meteorological Agency

=== Demographics ===
Per Japanese census data, the population of Onomichi in 2020 is 131,170 people. Onomichi has been conducting censuses since 1960.

Historical population
Year	Pop.	±%
1950	185,084	—
1955	183,338	−0.9%
1960	182,497	−0.5%
1965	181,038	−0.8%
1970	183,325	+1.3%
1975	185,503	+1.2%
1980	180,901	−2.5%
1985	177,532	−1.9%
1990	166,930	−6.0%
1995	159,890	−4.2%
2000	155,200	−2.9%
2005	150,225	−3.2%
2010	145,217	−3.3%
2015	138,626	−4.5%
2020	131,170	−5.4%
Onomichi population statistics

== History ==
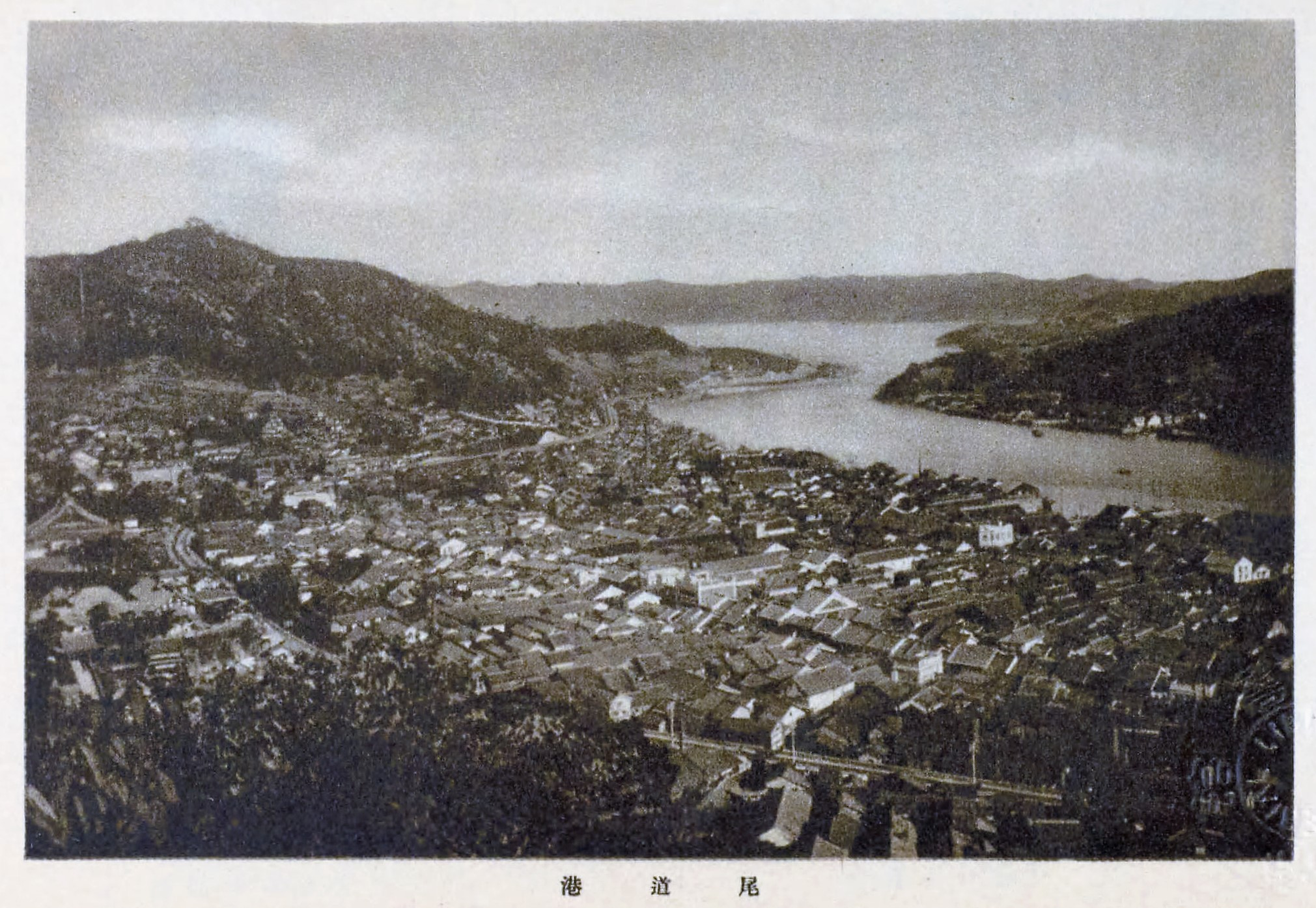
Onomichi in 1930

The port of Onomichi opened in 1168, serving for the next five centuries as a significant rice shipment center and a hub for foreign trade. While its commercial importance shifted during the Edo period, it remained a vital maritime location. On April 1, 1898, Onomichi Town in Mitsugi District was officially incorporated as the second city in Hiroshima Prefecture.

The city expanded significantly through the 20th century. In 1935, the notable ocean liner RMS Adriatic was scrapped at the city's docks. Between 1937 and 1970, Onomichi incorporated numerous neighboring municipalities, including the town of Kurihara and the village of Yoshiwa (1937), Sanba (1939), Fukada (1951), and several other villages from Mitsugi and Numakuma Districts through the 1950s. The town of Mukaihigashi joined the city in 1970.

In the 21st century, the city's boundaries reached their current form through major mergers. The towns of Mitsugi and Mukaishima were merged into Onomichi on March 28, 2005, followed by the incorporation of Innoshima and Setoda on January 10, 2006.

== Government ==
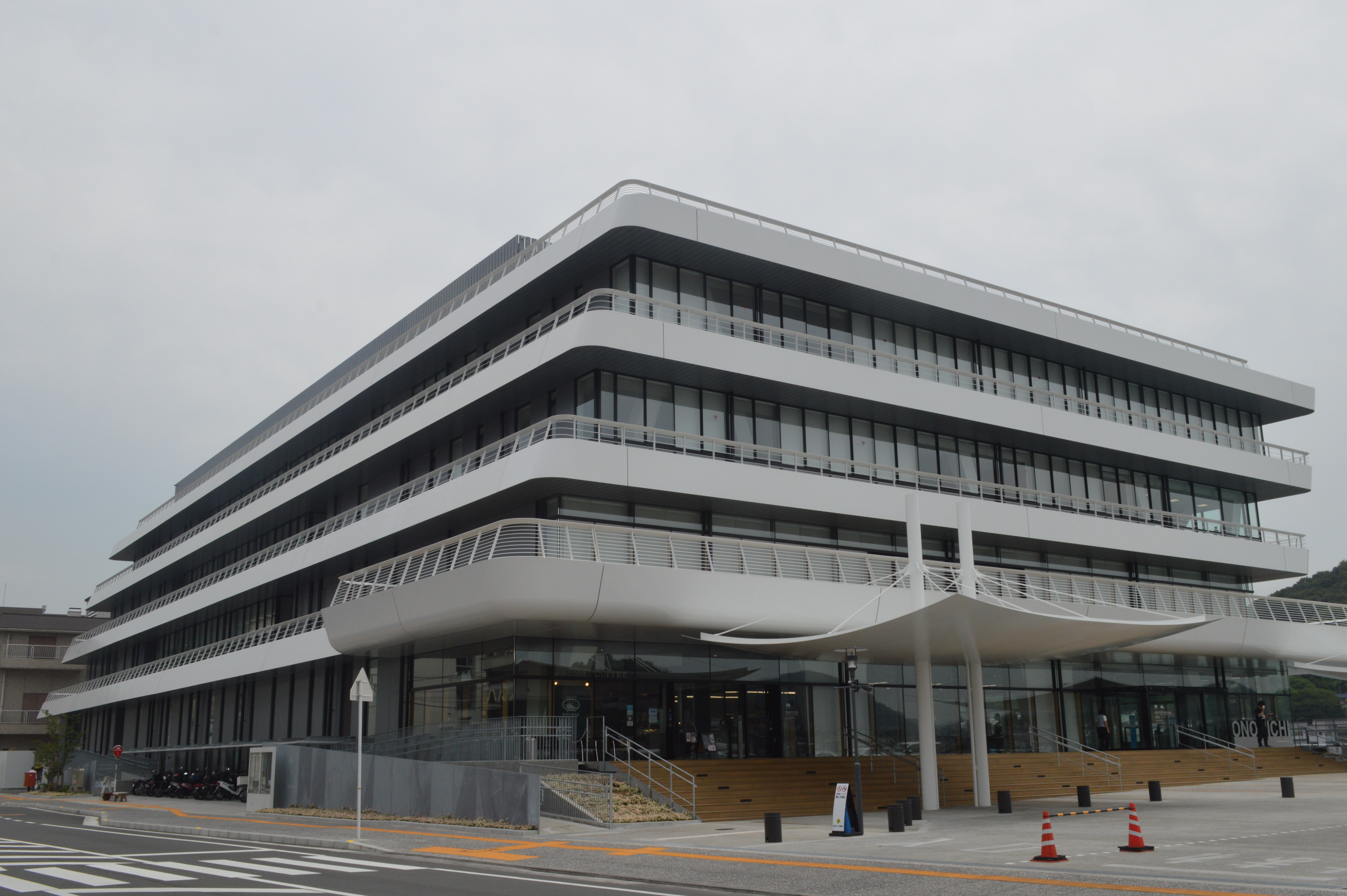
Onomichi City Hall

Onomichi has a mayor-council form of government with a directly elected mayor and a unicameral city council of 26 members. Onomichi contributes three members to the Hiroshima Prefectural Assembly. In terms of national politics, Onomichi is part of the Hiroshima 5th district of the lower house of the Diet of Japan. Prior to 2022, part of the city was in Hiroshima 6th district.

=== Crime and safety ===
The Kyodo-kai yakuza syndicate is based in Onomichi. The Kyodo-kai is the second largest yakuza group in the Chugoku region after the Hiroshima-based Kyosei-kai.

== Economy ==
Onomichi has prospered as a port town and a commercial city. Before World War II, it had an economy comparable to that of Hiroshima City. Shipyards have existed in Onomichi, Mukaishima, and Innoshima for a long time due to their location, which is blessed with water transport. In recent years, the shipbuilding industry has been in decline.

=== Manufacturing ===
==== Shipbuilding ====
- Hitachi Zosen Corporation Onomichi dock
- JFE Shoji Trade Shipbuilding
- Mukaishima Dock
- Naikai Shipbuilding
- Onomichi Dockyard
- Tsuneishi Shipbuilding
- Universal Shipbuilding Onomichi dock

==== Metalworking ====
- Press Kogyo
- Union Plate Onomichi plant

==== Chemistry ====
- Nitto Denko Onomichi plant
- Yokohama Rubber Company Onomichi plant

=== Agriculture ===
- Mikan, Grape, Juncus effusus, Scallion

=== Fishery ===
- Kamaboko, Stockfish, Tsukudani

=== Media ===
- Onomichi FM
- Onomichi Cable Television

=== Bookselling ===
- Keibunsha

== Education ==
Onomichi features 24 public elementary schools, 16 public junior high schools, and one public high school operated by the City Government. Additionally, six public high schools fall under the administration of the Hiroshima Prefectural Board of Education. The city also hosts one private middle school and one private high school, contributing to a diverse educational landscape. Moreover, the prefecture operates two special education schools for individuals with disabilities. It is also the location of Onomichi City University, a municipal university.

== Transportation ==
=== Railway ===
JR West – San'yō Shinkansen

- Shin-Onomichi

JR West (JR West) - San'yō Main Line

- Onomichi - Higashi-Onomichi

=== Highways ===
Most major expressways in the region intersect at the Onomichi Interchange.

Major Highways in Onomichi
Prefecture	Location	km	Road	Notes
Hiroshima	Onomichi	0	San'yō Expressway	Main east-west artery
Hiroshima	Onomichi	—	Onomichi Expressway	Connection to Chūgoku Expressway
Hiroshima	Onomichi	—	National Route 2	National Route 2

== Sister city relations ==
- Chiayi, Taiwan
- Imabari, Ehime, Japan
- Higashiizumo, Shimane, Japan
- Honfleur, France
- Jung District, Busan, Korea
- Taichung, Taiwan

== Local attractions ==
The city is known for its many temples such as the Buddhist Senkō-ji Temple (founded in the 9th century), has a shipbuilding yard and a motor factory. It offers a steamship service to ports of northern Shikoku and islands in the Inland Sea.

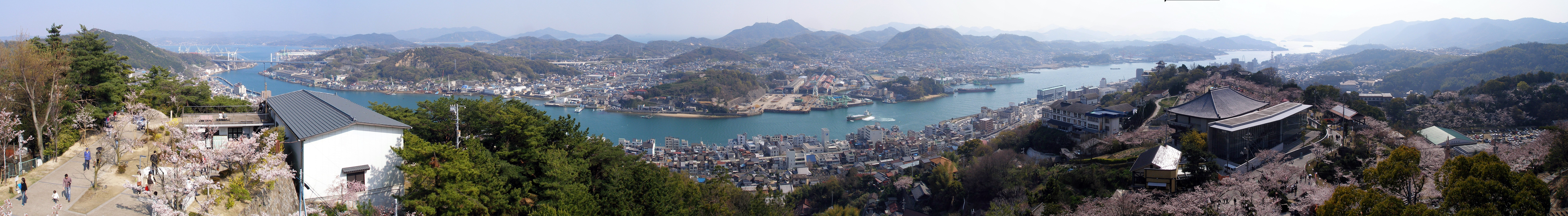
A panoramic view of Onomichi

=== Temples ===
- Senkō-ji – Chūgoku 33 Kannon Pilgrimage No. 10
- Kōmyō-ji
- Tennei-ji
- Jōdo-ji – Chūgoku 33 Kannon Pilgrimage No. 9
- Saigō-ji
- Saikoku-ji – Chūgoku 33 Kannon Pilgrimage
- Kongō-ji
- Kōsan-ji in Setoda, Hiroshima
- Kōjō-ji in Setoda – Chūgoku 33 Kannon Pilgrimage No.11
- Jikō-ji
- Kaifuku-ji
- Jōsen-ji
- Syōjyu-in
- Jikan-ji
- Myōsen-ji
- Taisan-ji

=== Shrines ===
- Misode-tenman-gū
- Ushitora Shrine – the oldest shrine in Onomichi
- Kubohachiman Shrine

=== Castles ===
- Innoshima Suigun Castle
- Onomichi Castle
- Fukuyama Domain Bansho site

=== Parks and gardens ===
- Senkoji Park on Mt. Senkoji – connected by Senkōji Ropeway from Onomichi Station
- Senkoji Park Green Land (1965–2007)
- Bingo Regional Sports Park
  - Onomichi Shimanami Baseball Stadium – NPB game held twice a year as Hiroshima Carp home game.
- Mukaishima Orchid Center
- Innoshima Flower Center
- Citrus Park Setoda
- Innoshima Ohashi Memorial Park
- Mt. Takami National Park
- Tachibana Nature Village
- The Island's Blooms – The Pyrethrum
- Hyakka Park
- Souraiken Garden
- Mitsugi Greenland
- Marine Youth Center
- Mitsugi Softball Ballpark
- Chojabara Sports Center
- Mukaishima Sports Park
- Innoshima Sports Park
- Innoshima Amenity Pool
- Kaibutsu-en Ato (The remains of Kaibutsu-en) – The garden of the House of Tomishima (Tenmaya)

=== Museums ===
- Onomichi City Museum of Art
- Ikuo Hirayama Museum of Art – by named after Ikuo Hirayama
- Musee Nakata
- Onomichi Literature Museum
- Entsuba Katsuzo Sculpture Museum
- Honinbo Shusaku Igo Memorial Museum – by named after Honinbo Shusaku
- Museum of Setoda History and Folklore
- Onomichi Historical Museum
- Innoshima History Museum
- Island-Wide Art Museum
- Onomichi Motion Picture Museum

=== Beaches ===
- Shimanami Beach
- Ohamasaki Camp Site
- Setoda Sunset Beach
- Setoda B & G Marine Center
- Tachibana Beach
- Iwashijima Beach on Iwashijima Island

=== Hot springs ===
- Harada-cho Yujin Hot spring
- Mitsugi Yu Yu-Kan
- Natural Spa Onomichi Fureai no Sato
- Yoro onsen

=== Others ===
- Literature Path
- Nishiseto Expressway – "Shimanami Expressway" connects Onomichi and Imabari, Ehime
- Innoshima Suigun Skyline
- Kaneyoshi Bus Stop
- Statue of Fumiko Hayashi
- Onomichi City Library
- Tsureshio Stone Monuments
- Shimanami Koryu-kan – "Teatro Shell-rune"
- Bel Canto Hall
- Crossroad Mitsugi

=== Festivals ===
- Onomichi Minato Matsuri – the Port Festival – April
- Onomichi Sumiyoshi Hanabi Matsuri – Fireworks – the last Sunday of July
- Innoshima Suigun Matsuri – at Suigun Castle – August
- Onomichi Betcha Matsuri – November 1–3

== In popular culture ==
The city is featured in the Japanese film Tokyo Story (1953) directed by Yasujirō Ozu, and became more famous during 80s and 90s decade thanks to Nobuhiko Obayashi movies, such as Exchange Students (1982), The Girl Who Leapt Through Time (1983), Lonely Heart (1985) or Goodbye for Tomorrow (also distributed under the titles Tomorrow or Ashita) (1995), that were very popular between 80s teen generation. It is the setting for the fantasy 2005 anime series Kamichu! which faithfully depicts many of the city's features and landmarks. Events of the Blue Drop series also happen in this city. It is also the setting of the romantic manga Pastel by Toshihiko Kobayashi. The video game Yakuza 6: The Song of Life features a fictional district of Onomichi named Jingaicho based on the downtown area of the city as the main location in the story.

=== Books ===
- A Dark Night's Passing (1921) by Naoya Shiga
- Diary of a Vagabond (1930) by Fumiko Hayashi
- The Accordion and the Fish Town (1931) by Fumiko Hayashi
- Akumyō (1961) by Tōkō Kon
- Four Seasons in Japan (2023) by Nick Bradley

=== Films ===
- Tokyo Story by Yasujirō Ozu (1953)
- Films by Kaneto Shindō
  - Kanashimi wa onna dakeni (1958)
  - The Naked Island (1960)
- Akumyō series by Tokuzo Tanaka, Kazuo Mori, Kimiyoshi Yasuda, Masahiro Makino, Yasuzo Masumura, Seiji Izumi (1961–2001)
- Nikui an-chikushô by Koreyoshi Kurahara (1962)
- Boy by Nagisa Oshima (1969)
- Films by Nobuhiko Obayashi
  - Exchange Students (1982)
  - The Girl Who Leapt Through Time (1983)
  - Lonely Heart (1985)
  - Chizuko's Younger Sister (1991)
  - Goodbye for Tomorrow (also distributed under the titles Tomorrow or Ashita) (1995)
  - One Summer's Day (1999)
  - His Motorbike, Her Island (1986)
  - Bound for the Fields, the Mountains, and the Seacoast (1986)
  - The Stupid Teacher (1998)
- Yamato by Junya Sato (2005)

=== Drama ===
- Teppan (2010)
- A Girl & Three Sweethearts (2016)

=== Manga ===
- Hikaru no Go (1998–2003)
- Parallel (2000–2002)
- Pastel (2002–2017)
- Shimanami Tasogare by Yuhki Kamatani (2015–2018)

=== Anime ===
- Kamichu! (2005–2007)
- Blue Drop (2007)
- Pon no Michi (2024)
- Zatsu Tabi: That's Journey (2025)

=== Video games ===
- Boku no Natsuyasumi 4 (2009)
- Yakuza 6: The Song of Life (2016)
- Between the Sky and Sea (2017–2019)

== Notable people from Onomichi ==
=== Politicians ===
- Isao Kiso

=== Musicians ===
- Porno Graffitti
- Masami Shiratama

=== Go players ===
- Dogen Handa

=== TV ===
- Mona Yamamoto

=== Sports ===
- Hideto Tanihara
- Mariko Yoshida

=== Authors/artists ===
- Katayama Bokuyō
- Kiyotaka Haimura
- Ikuo Hirayama
- Kaiji Kawaguchi
- Eiko Minami
- Nobuhiko Obayashi
- Genichiro Takahashi
- Masami Teraoka

=== Voice Actor ===
- Yoshimasa Hosoya
