= Majisuka Gakuen =

Japanese television drama series

- Majisuka Gakuen 4 Promotion
- Also known as: Majisuka Academy
- Kanji: マジすか学園
- Genre: Teen drama Action; Comedy
- Created by: Yasushi Akimoto; AKB48
- Directed by: Futoshi Sato; Keisuke Toyoshima; Yoichi Matsunaga
- Starring: AKB48
- Theme music composer: Yasushi Akimoto
- Opening theme: "Majisuka Rock N' Roll" (Season 1) "Yankee Soul" (Season 2) "Ponkotsu Blues" (Season 3) "Majisuka Fight" (Season 4) "Yankee Machinegun" (Season 5) "Yuri o Sakaseru ka? (Season 7)
- Ending theme: "Sakura no Shiori" (Season 1) "Seishun to Kizukanai Mama" (Season 2) "Dōki" (Season 3) "Yankee Rock" (Season 4) "Gunzō"(Season 5)
- Country of origin: Japan
- Original language: Japanese
- No. of seasons: 8
- No. of episodes: 58

Production
- Producers: Junpei Nakagawa; Shinji Okabe; Kazuhiko Abiru; Yuji Ishida; Saya Hidemi
- Running time: 30 Minutes
- Production companies: TV Tokyo (Seasons 1-3); Dentsu; AKS

Original release
- Network: TV Tokyo Seasons 1-3; Nippon TV Season 4 & part of Season 5 Hulu Japan Season 5
- Release: January 9, 2010 – October 26, 2015

Related
- AKBingo! AKB48 Show! Innocent Lilies; Cabasuka Gakuen

Majisuka Gakuen (マジすか学園) (lit. "Majisuka Academy") is a Japanese television drama series about high school delinquents, starring members of idol group AKB48.

The first season aired in 2010 on TV Tokyo. A second season Majisuka Gakuen 2 was aired the following year.

The third season is set in a different continuity from the previous seasons, and was aired on July 13, 2012.

In 2015, the series moved to NTV and the fourth season, which returned to the same continuity as seasons 1 and 2, was aired on January 19, 2015. On the same year, a fifth season was announced and for the first time will be aired exclusively on internet, by the streaming site Hulu Japan, because NTV only broadcast the first two episodes on August 24 due to various scenes of violence, which did not justify full season showing on TV.

A special spin-off from the fourth and fifth seasons of the series, titled Majisuka Gakuen 0: Kisarazu Rantōhen (マジすか学園0 木更津乱闘編; Majisuka Academy 0: The story of the Brawl at Kisarazu), is a prequel to season 4. It was the first to feature members of HKT48 as the main cast and was produced in collaboration with the rock band Kishidan. It was aired on November 28, 2015, on NTV at 25:05 JST and run for half an hour.

Another spinoff titled Cabasuka Gakuen aired from October 2016 to January 2017. It is set after the events of an unresolved alternate ending to the fourth season. In a departure from the fist-fighting theme of previous seasons, it saw the girls opening and running a hostess club in order to save their school from shutting down as it had gone bankrupt.

The latest iteration of the series is Majimuri Gakuen, aired in July 2018, which features an entirely new cast and continuity, and was set at a different school.

== Seasons ==
Season	Episodes	Premiere	Finale	Main character	Network
1	12	January 9, 2010	March 27, 2010	Atsuko Maeda	TV Tokyo
2	12	April 16, 2011	July 2, 2011	Atsuko Maeda	TV Tokyo
3	12	July 14, 2012	October 6, 2012	Haruka Shimazaki	TV Tokyo
4	10	January 20, 2015	March 30, 2015	Haruka Shimazaki; Sakura Miyawaki	Nippon Television
5	12	August 24, 2015	October 27, 2015	Haruka Shimazaki; Sakura Miyawaki	Hulu; NTV aired only episodes 1 & 2
0 (Spin-off Special)	1	November 28, 2015	November 28, 2015	HKT48	Nippon Television, Hulu

== 1st Season Cast ==
=== Majisuka All-Girls High School (also known as Majijo) ===
==== Homeroom 2-C ====
- Transfer Students
  - Atsuko Maeda as the character with the same name
  - Nachu as Daruma Onizuka
- Team Hormone
  - Rino Sashihara as Wota: Team Hormone Leader
  - Moeno Nitō as Bungee / Banjī: Team Hormone Sub-Leader
  - Aki Takajō as Akicha: Team Hormone Treasurer
  - Rie Kitahara as Unagi
  - Mika Komori as Mukuchi

==== Rappappa - "Top of Majijo" ====
- Yūko Ōshima as the character with the same name, Rappappa Leader
- Mariko Shinoda as Sado, Rappappa Sub-Leader
- The Four Heavenly Queens
  - Haruna Kojima as Torigoya
  - Rena Matsui as Gekikara
  - Yuki Kashiwagi as Black / Burakku
  - Tomomi Itano as Shibuya
- 1st Year Students
  - Sayaka Nakaya as Anime
  - Miku Tanabe as Jumbo / Janbo
  - Rumi Yonezawa as Rice / Raisu
  - Haruka Katayama as Shōwa

==== Other Students ====
- 3rd Year
  - Sayaka Akimoto as Chōkoku
- 2nd Year
  - The Kabuki Sisters
    - Tomomi Kasai as Dai Kabuki: The older Kabuki sister.
    - Asuka Kuramochi as Kō Kabuki: The younger Kabuki sister.
  - Sae Miyazawa as Gakuran
  - Minami Minegishi as the character with the same name: The self-proclaimed Student Council President.
- 1st Year
  - The Sanshō Sisters
    - Miho Miyazaki as Myao
    - Aika Ōta as Love-tan
    - Manami Oku as Manamana
  - Mayu Watanabe as Nezumi
  - Kumi Yagami as Dance / Dansu: Underling of Shibuya.
  - Jurina Matsui as Center / Sentā
  - Erena Ono as the character with the same name: The younger sister of Minami Ono.
- Year Unknown
  - Kinmayu-kai
    - Miho Wakizawa as Leader (Unnamed)
    - Mayu Co. as Unnamed Officer
    - Anzu Momoto as Unnamed Member
    - Anzu Ikehata as Unnamed Member
    - SHIN-YONG as Unnamed Member
    - Sonomi Miyahayashi as Unnamed Member
  - Shizuka Ōya as Miki: She was seen being beaten up by the Sanshō Sisters in Episode 4.

==== Faculty ====
- Eri Fuse as Yuriko Nojima: Headmaster of Majijo, Former Rappappa Leader.
- Toru Tezuka as Kiken: Doctor at Majijo.
- Susumu Kobayashi as Kūki: Homeroom 2-C Math Teacher at Majijo.

=== Yabakune All-Girls High School ===
- Asami Hihara as School Gang Leader
- Natsu Andō as Migiude: 2nd in Command at Yabakune.
- Amina Satō as Chiharu
- Yukari Satō as Sanae

=== Yagi All-Girls High School ===
- Minami Takahashi as Minami Ono: Atsuko's best friend and Erena Ono's older sister. In a flashback from Episodes 9 and 10, she was killed by a group of yankees that were after Atsuko.

=== Atsuko's Parents ===
- Masahiro Komoto as Yoshiro Maeda: Atsuko's father.
- Sawa Suzuki as Sachiko Maeda: Atsuko's mother, ex-Yabakune Leader.

== 2nd Season Cast ==
=== Majisuka All-Girls High School (also known as Majijo) ===
==== Rappappa - "Top of Majijo" ====
- Atsuko Maeda as the character with the same name: Rappappa Sub-Leader.
- Yui Yokoyama as Otabe: Rappappa Leader.
- The Four Heavenly Queens
  - Minami Minegishi as Shaku: She was the Student Council President from the 1st season.
  - Rena Matsui as Amakuchi/Chūkara/Gekikara
  - Kabuki Sisters (Nō・Kyōgen Sisters)
    - Tomomi Kasai as Dai Kabuki (Big Kabuki)
    - Asuka Kuramochi as Ko Kabuki (Small Kabuki)
  - Sae Miyazawa as Yōran: She formerly used the name "Gakuran" in the 1st season.
- Nachu as Daruma Onizuka
- Team Hormone
  - Rino Sashihara as Wota: Team Hormone Leader
  - Moeno Nitō as Bungee / Banjī: Team Hormone Sub-Leader
  - Aki Takajō as Akicha: Team Hormone Treasurer
  - Rie Kitahara as Unagi
  - Mika Komori as Mukuchi

==== Tsu no Ji Rengō ====
- Mayu Watanabe as Nezumi
- Jurina Matsui as Center / Sentā

==== Other Students ====
2nd Year

- Team Under
  - Sayaka Nakaya as Anime
  - Miku Tanabe as Jumbo / Janbo
  - Rumi Yonezawa as Rice / Raisu
  - Haruka Katayama as Shōwa
- Team Fondue
  - Haruka Shimada as Docchi
  - Suzuran Yamauchi as Tsuri
  - Haruka Shimazaki as Kanburi
  - Miori Ichikawa as Lemon / Remon
  - Mina Oba as Toshima

==== Faculty ====
- Eri Fuse as Yuriko Nojima: Headmaster of Majijo, Former Rappappa Leader before Yuko Oshima.

=== Majijo Graduates ===
- Yūko Ōshima as the character with the same name: The Former Rappappa Leader who had died before the events of the 2nd season.
- Mariko Shinoda as Sado: Former Rappappa Sub-Leader.
- Haruna Kojima as Torigoya: Former Rappappa Queen.
- Yuki Kashiwagi as Black / Burakku: Former Rappappa Queen.
- Tomomi Itano as Shibuya: Former Rappappa Queen. She joined Yabakune as their leader in Episode 2.
- Sayaka Akimoto as Chōkoku

=== Yabakune All-Girls High School ===
- Hadashi no Kai (Habu)
  - 3rd Year
    - Tomomi Itano as Shibuya: Yabakune Leader, Former Rappappa Queen. She became Yabakune's leader in Episode 2.
    - Amina Satō as Chiharu
    - Yukari Satō as Sanae
    - Mayumi Uchida as Janken
  - 2nd Year
    - Kumi Yagami as Dance / Dansu: Underling of Shibuya.
    - Ayaka Kikuchi as Comeback
    - Ami Maeda as Mayuge / Mayu-ge
    - Sumire Satō as Sanshoku / San-Shoku
    - Mariya Nagao as Mariyagi
    - The Sanshō Sisters > Nimaiba
      - Miho Miyazaki as Myao
      - Aika Ōta as Love-tan
  - 1st Year
    - Kanon Kimoto as Miso

==== Other Students (appearing only in Episode 12) ====
- Misaki Iwasa
- Shizuka Ōya
- Haruka Nakagawa
- Natsumi Matsubara
- Ayaka Umeda
- Tomomi Nakatsuka
- Misato Nonaka
- Reina Fujie
- Sakiko Matsui
- Haruka Ishida
- Kana Kobayashi
- Shihori Suzuki
- Natsuki Sato
- Natsumi Hirajima
- Yuka Masuda
- Anna Mori
- Rina Izuta
- Rena Kato
- Rina Kawaei
- Natsuki Kojima
- Marina Kobayashi
- Wakana Natori
- Nana Fujita
- Ayaka Morikawa

=== Yabakune Graduates (appearing only in Episode 12) ===
- Asami Hihara as the Former Yabakune Gang Leader
- Natsu Andō as Migiude: Former Yabakune Gang 2nd in Command

=== Sutegoro High School ===
- Shiori Nakamata as Nakamata
- Maria Abe as Maria
- Anna Iriyama as Anna
- Miyu Takeuchi as Miyu
- Mariko Nakamura as Mariko

=== Others ===
- Yūko Ōshima as Yuka / Yuki: Yuko Oshima's two surviving triplet sisters.
- Minami Takahashi as Police Inspector

== 3rd Season Cast ==
=== Prison "HOPE" ===
==== Team Habu ====
- Haruka Shimazaki as Paru
- Yuria Kizaki as Peace / Pīsu
- Mina Oba as Dāsu
- Kumi Yagami as Komimi
- Rina Kawaei as Nanashi
- Kanon Kimoto as Nantene
- Maria Abe as Tetsuo / Tetsuwo
- Haruka Shimada as Uruseeyo
- Jurina Matsui as Nobunaga: The original leader who had disappeared before the events of the 3rd season. She returned in the fifth episode.

==== Team Mongoose ====
- Anna Iriyama as An'nin
- Miyu Takeuchi as Miyu
- Rena Kato as Shokakku
- Miori Ichikawa as Sudachi
- Suzuran Yamauchi as Bunker / Banka
- Juri Takahashi as Messi / Messhi
- Mariya Nagao as Yagi
- Anna Murashige as Jovijovich

==== Other Prisoners ====
- Rie Kitahara, Shiori Nakamata, Yuka Tano, Karen Iwata, Mariko Nakamura, and Akane Takayanagi as Unnamed Prisoners

==== Prison Staff ====
- Yoriko Dōguchi as Prison Head: In the twelfth episode, she is revealed to be Peace's mother.
- Yasuji Kimura as Nozomu Dedokoro: Prison Warden
- Koiku Misawa, Tomoyasu Yamamoto, Daisuke Hibari, Yuichiro Suzuki, and Kenzo Fukutsu as Jailers

=== Others ===
- Kazuki Fukuyama as Keita Yoyogi

== 4th Season Cast ==
=== Majisuka All-Girls High School (also known as Majijo) ===
- Sakura Miyawaki as the character with the same name: 2nd Year Transfer Student from Kagoshima

==== Rappappa - "Top of Majijo" ====
- Haruka Shimazaki as Salt / Soruto, Rappappa Leader
- The Four Heavenly Queens
  - Yui Yokoyama as Otabe: Former Rappappa Leader before Salt.
  - Yuria Kizaki as Magic / Majikku
  - Rina Kawaei as Bakamono
  - Anna Iriyama as Yoga

==== Team Hinabe (2nd Year) ====
- Juri Takahashi as Uonome
- Rena Kato as Dodobusu
- Ryōka Ōshima as Kusogaki
- Mion Mukaichi as Jisedai
- Natsuki Uchiyama as Kenpō

==== Kamisori & Zombie (1st Year) ====
- Mako Kojima as Kamisori
- Nana Owada as Zombie / Zonbi

==== 3rd Year ====
- Rino Sashihara as Scandal / Sukyandaru (repeating 3rd Year)

==== 2nd Year ====
- Karen Iwata as Masamune
- Chiyori Nakanishi as Busakawa
- Mizuki Tsuchiyasu as Yosakoi
- Yuiri Murayama as Dokuringo
- Nana Okada as Katabutsu
- Hikari Hashimoto as Muneatsu
- Rena Nozawa as Perapera
- Seina Fukuoka as Hidarī
- Rina Izuta as Yanzuna
- Saho Iwatate as Erinki
- Wakana Natori as Ojō
- Rina Hirata as Kurofune
- Moe Goto as Uirō
- Miyabi Ino as Meshiuma
- Ayano Umeta as Umeta
- Moe Aigasa as Yankee / Yankī
- Miki Nishino as Over / Ōbā
- Miori Ichikawa as Lemon / Remon
- Mitsuki Maeda as Dekakawa
- Natsuki Kojima as Eikō
- Manami Ichikawa as Sabasaba
- Mayu Ogasawara as Biriken
- Haruka Shimada as Shimada

=== Gekioko High School Nursing Department ===
==== 3rd Year ====
- Sayaka Yamamoto as Antonio: School Gang Leader
- Miyuki Watanabe as Coby / Kobii: School Gang Sub-Leader

==== 2nd Year ====
- Akari Suda as Tsurishi
- Marika Tani as KY
- Kaori Matsumura as Zakoboss / Zakobosu
- Miru Shiroma as Shirogiku
- Fūko Yagura as Kurobara

==== Year Unknown (Most Likely 1st Year) ====
- Nao Furuhata as Diva
- Rina Kondo as Bukkomi
- Kei Jonishi as Demekin
- Natsumi Tanaka as 170
- Anna Murashige as Siberia
- Shu Yabushita as Kimotama
- Kanako Kadowaki as Ibukuro
- Anna Ijiri as Ijirī
- Eriko Jo as Joe
- Sae Murase as Tekitō
- Mai Fuchigami as Otenki
- Serina Kumazawa as Hamster
- Airi Tanigawa as Handsome
- Michelle Christo Kusnadi as Michelle

=== Majijo Graduates ===
- Haruna Kojima as Kojiharu: Pop Star, Former Rappappa Queen.
- Minami Takahashi as the character with the same name: Owner of Casual Diner Asobina, Former Rappappa Queen.
- Nachu as Daruma Onizuka: Housewife.
- Jurina Matsui as Center / Sentā: Nurse.
- Mayu Watanabe as Nezumi

=== Yabakune All-Girls High School ===
- Mariya Nagao as Gekkō: A Candidate for Gang Leader who appeared only in Episode 10. The real leader appeared only in Episode 8 and was played by an unknown actress.
- Tomu Mutō as Tsun
- Saya Kawamoto as Rookie / Rūkī

=== 4th Season Gaiden ===
Episodes

1. Team Hinabe and Kamisori & Zombie, Seriously Battle (チーム火鍋とカミソリ&ゾンビ、マジでバトる, Chīmu Hinabe to Kamisori and Zombie, maji de batoru)
2. Dodobusu seriously renamed!? (ドドブスがマジで改名!?, Dodobusu ga maji de kaimei!?)
3. Kamisori is seriously a Slump!? (カミソリがマジでスランプ!?, Kamisori ga maji de suranpu!?)
4. Seriously Gekioko Sneaks In! (マジで激尾高が潜入!, Maji de Gekiokō ga Sennyū!)
5. Seriously Transfer Student Comes In! (マジで転校生がやってくる!, Maji de Tenkōsei ga Yatte kuru!)
6. Uonome, Seriously Reasoning (ウオノメ、マジで推理する, Uonome, maji de suiri suru)

== 5th Season Cast ==
=== Majisuka All-Girls High School (also known as Majijo) ===
==== Rappappa - "Top of Majijo" ====
- The Four Heavenly Queens
  - Sakura Miyawaki as the character with the same name: Rappappa Sub-Leader
  - Yui Yokoyama as Otabe
  - Yuria Kizaki as Magic / Majikku
  - Anna Iriyama as Yoga
- Haruka Shimazaki as Salt / Soruto: Rappappa Leader. At the final moments of Episode 1, she was shot to death by an unknown assailant

==== Team Hinabe ====
- Juri Takahashi as Uonome
- Rena Kato as Dodobusu
- Ryoka Oshima as Kusogaki
- Mion Mukaichi as Jisedai
- Natsuki Uchiyama as Kenpō

==== 1st Year Students ====
- Mako Kojima as Kamisori
- Nana Ōwada as Zombie / Zonbi

==== Other students ====
- Nana Okada as Katabutsu
- Haruka Kodama as Katsuzetsu: Transfer Student

==== Staff ====
- Toshiya Sakai as Satoru Mōri: Headmaster of Majijo. In Episode 12, he was revealed to be Salt's killer.

=== Gekioko High School Nursing Department ===
- Sayaka Yamamoto as Antonio: School Gang Leader.
- Miyuki Watanabe as Coby / Kobii: School Gang Sub-Leader.
- Akari Suda as Tsurishi
- Marika Tani as KY
- Kaori Matsumura as Zakoboss / Zakobosu
- Miru Shiroma as Shirogiku
- Fūko Yagura as Kurobara
- Akari Yoshida as Red / Reddo
- Kei Jonishi as Demekin

=== Yabakune All-Girls High School ===
- Megu Taniguchi as Head / Heddo: Fifteenth Generation Gang Leader
- Mariya Nagao as Gekkō
- Tomu Mutō as Kaibun
- Saya Kawamoto as Rookie / Rūkī
- Yuiri Murayama as Candy / Kyandī
- Nao Furuhata as Snake / Sunēku
- Yuka Tano as Amon

=== Majijo Graduates ===
- Rina Kawaei as Bakamono: Former Rappappa Queen
- Minami Takahashi as the character with the same name: Owner of Casual Diner Asobina, Raised by the Ryūtō Clan, Former Rappappa Queen.
- Jurina Matsui as Center / Sentā: She quit being a nurse after she saw the news of Salt killed by an assassin.

=== Cameo appearance ===
- Miyū Ōmori as Kaidan (ep.1), Cloud (ep.9)
- Ayana Shinozaki as Donkame (ep.1)
- Atsuko Maeda as the character with the same name (ep.2)
- Yūko Ōshima as either the character with the same name or one of that character's sisters (Yuka and Yuki) (ep.2)
- Yuki Kashiwagi as Black / Burakku (ep.2)
- Haruna Kojima as Torigoya/Kojiharu (ep.2)
- Mayu Watanabe as Nezumi (ep.2)
- Miyabi Ino as Meshiuma (ep.9)
- Ayaka Okada as Okamochi (ep.9)
- Haruka Shimada as Okami (ep.9)
- Karen Iwata as Anison (ep.9)
- Rena Nozawa as Speak / Supīku (ep.9)
- Miki Nishino as Chicken / Chikin (ep.9)
- Miona Hori as Nogi Female Student (ep.10)

=== 5th Season Gaiden ===
Episodes

1. Lost Child Center (迷子センター, Maigo Sentā)
2. Letter to Mother (お母さんへの手紙, Okāsan e no Tegami)
3. Moving (引越し, Hikkoshi)
4. Family Restaurant's Job Interview (ファミレスの面接, Fami Resu no Mensetsu)
5. Graduation Ceremony (卒業式, Sotsugyōshiki)

== Spin-Off Special: Kisarazu Rantōhen ==
=== Shekarashika Joshi Shōgyō ===
- Sakura Miyawaki as the character with the same name: In prior to change school to Majisuka All-Girls High School, her hair is a long ponytail before it was cut short. She also tried to avoid fighting other Yankee.
- Haruka Kodama as Katsuzetsu: Always together with Sakura.
- Rino Sashihara as Ageman: Show's ex. girlfriend. She was previously a former Majisuka student of Team Hormone's leader as Wota.
- Chihiro Anai as Neji
- Yui Kojina as Narushi
- Riko Sakaguchi as Fukurotoji
- Meru Tashima as Megaphone
- Miku Tanaka as Otona
- Natsumi Matsuoka as Oshiri
- Nako Yabuki as Namaiki
- Aika Ota as Ogi
- Mio Tomonaga as Bōyomi
- Mai Fuchigami as Chikoku
- Aoi Motomura as Gōkyū
- Madoka Moriyasu as Kakuni
- Emiri Yamashita as Katakana

=== Kisarazu Yankee Corps ===
- Show Ayanocozey as Show; Ageman's ex.boyfriend
- Hikaru Saotome as Mimiuchi
- Hitomi Saionji as Teigaku
- Hoshi Grandmarnier as Taigaku
- Shouchikubai Shiratori as Master

== Majimuri Gakuen (2018) ==
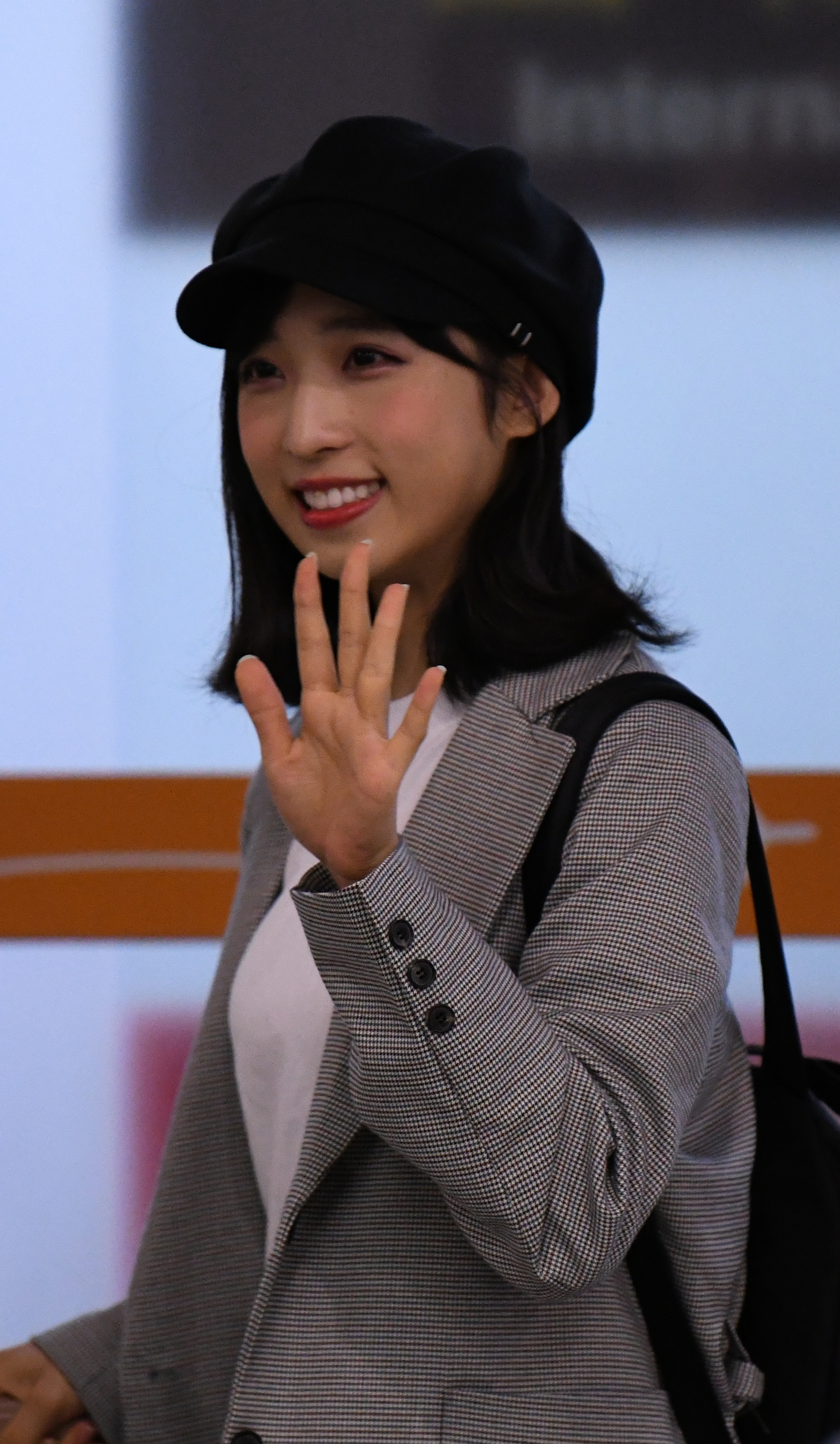
Yui Oguri (Lily)

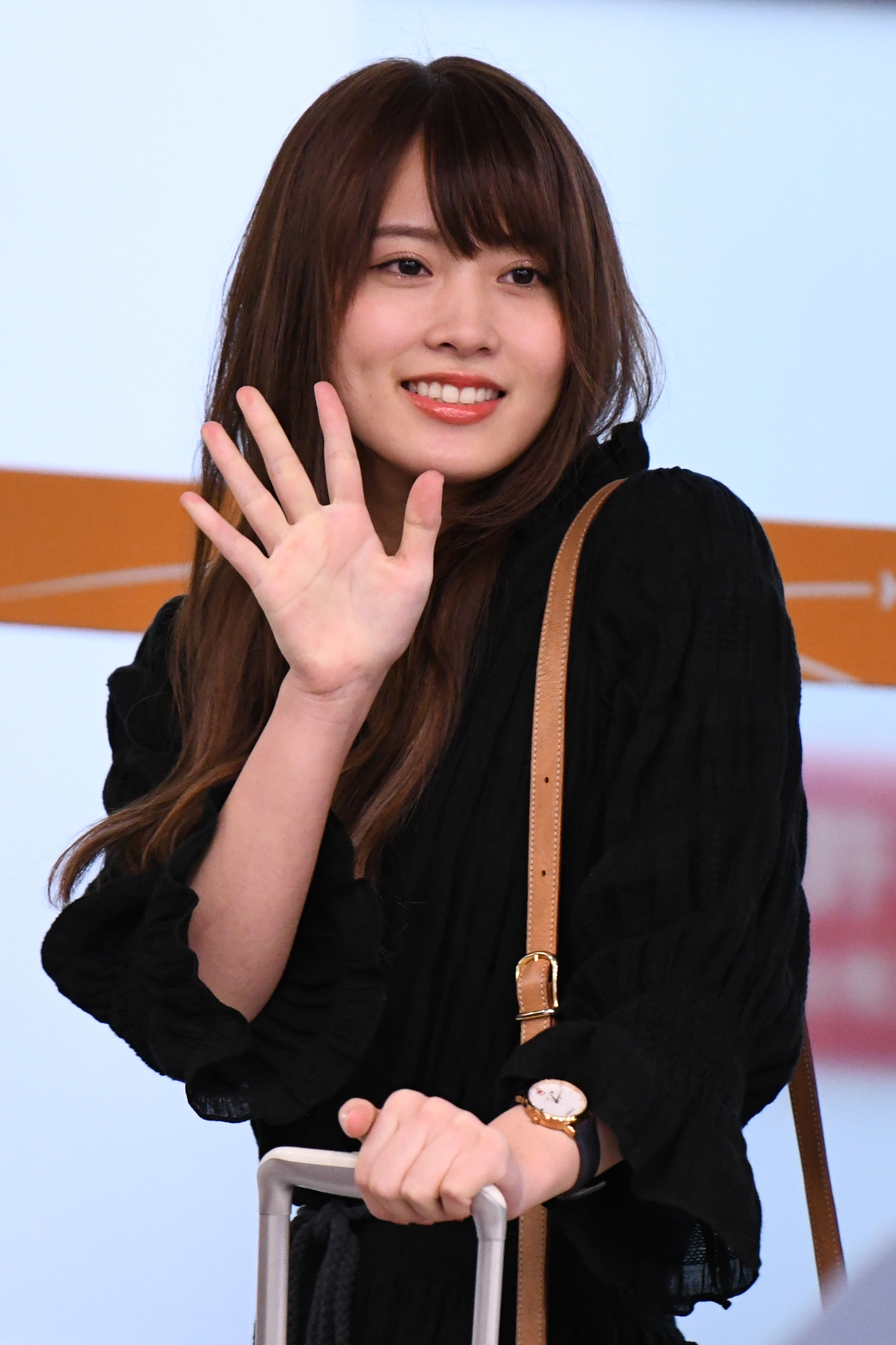
Rin Okabe (Hina)

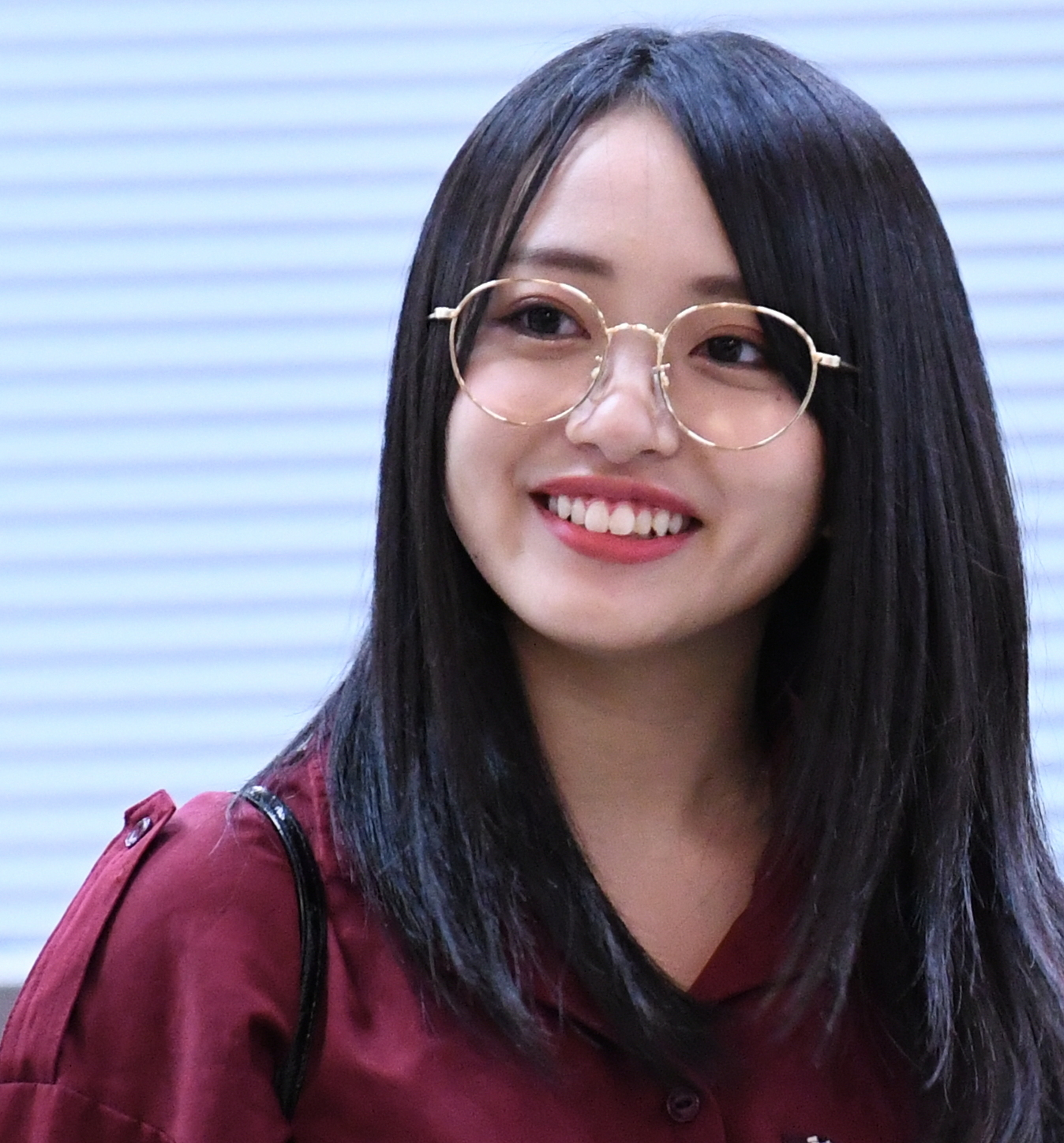
Mion Mukaichi (Bara)

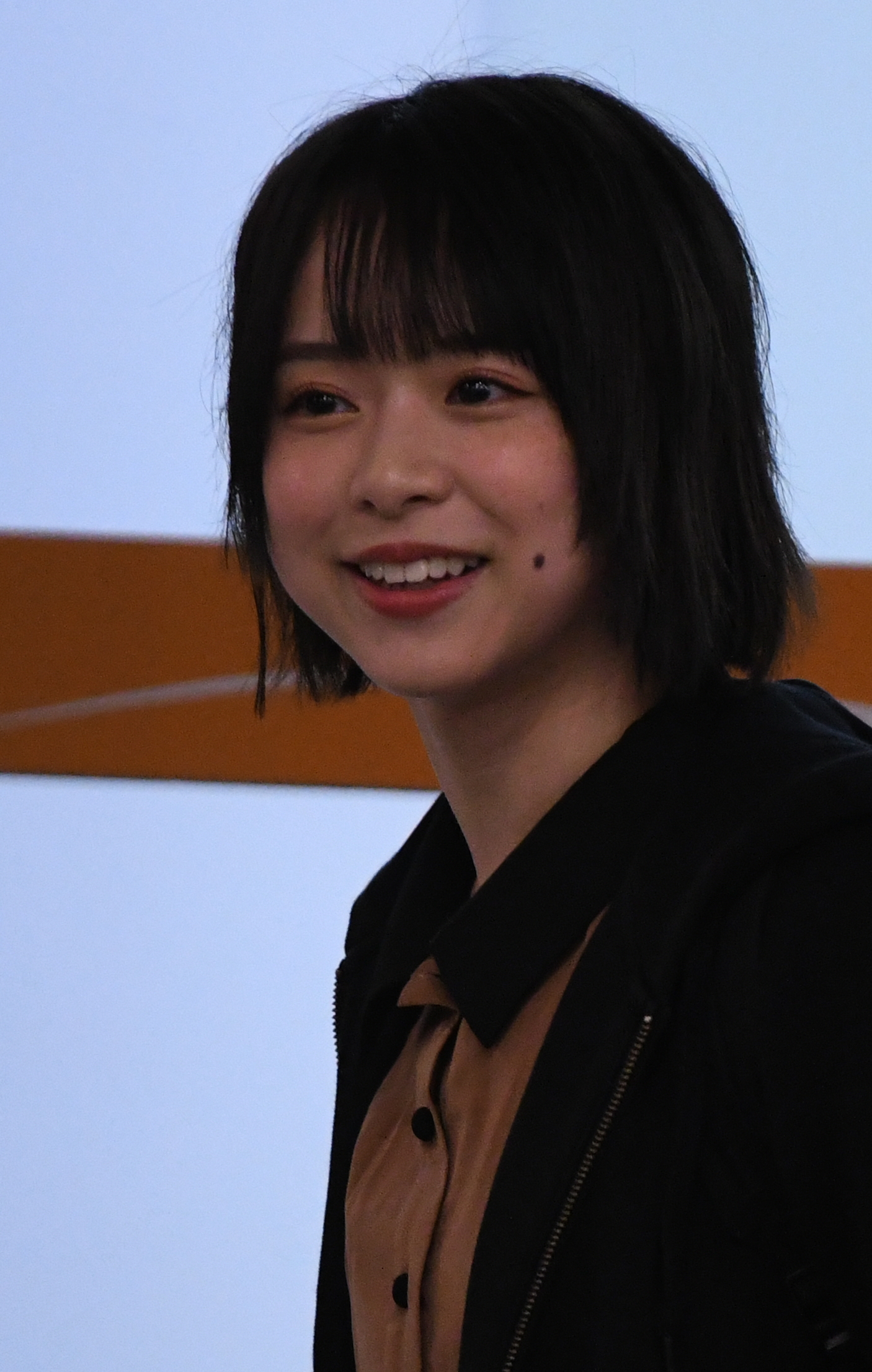
Narumi Kuranoo (Sumire)

Majimuri Gakuen main cast

The story is set at Utopia Arashigaoka, a new town created by the real estate company Gosaki Land. In the Arashigaoka Gakuen private school, the students are divided into "elite" (選民, senmin) and "commoner" (平民, heimin) statuses with a strict social hierarchy, with Aran Gosaki, also known as Kaiser (Hinata Honma), at the top as the student council president. Sayuri "Lily" Shimizu (Yui Oguri), a mysterious girl with formidable fighting skills, transferred to the school and become friends with Hina Asahi (Rin Okabe), Ikumi "Bara" Kuwabara (Mion Mukaichi), and Sumire Yamamoto (Narumi Kuranoo). Calling themselves the Hana-gumi (花組; "Flower Group"), they fight to put an end to the school hierarchy and Kaiser's tyranny, while also facing the impending threat from the Arechi Technical School led by Manji (Yumiko Takino).

Unlike previous installments, this season features co-educational schools and brawls between female and male students. Some of the male fighters are portrayed by real-life pro wrestlers and martial artists, such as kickboxer Yasuhiro Kido, pro wrestler Yukio Sakaguchi, and former Estonian sumo wrestler Baruto Kaito.

The series was adapted into a stage play, which was performed on October 19–28, 2018 at the Nippon Seinenkan Hall, Tokyo. The stage play returned to an all-female cast lineup, and with the exception of Yui Kojina of HKT48 and the guest stars, all the named characters were portrayed by AKB48 members. Nana Okada portrayed the main antagonist, Nero.

=== Majimuri Gakuen: Rai (2021) ===
In February 2021, it was announced that a second stage play, titled Majimuri Gakuen: Rai (マジムリ学園 蕾-RAI-; Majimuri Gakuen: Flower Buds) would be produced and performed in the end of March. This stage play would be part of the seventh anniversary celebration of AKB48 Team 8, of which most of the series' main cast are members, and all the regular characters would be portrayed by members of that team.

The play is set two years after the events of the first stage play, when the Hana-gumi have become senior students and gone their separate ways. While Lily is still the highly respected leader of the Hana-gumi, Hina has become the new student council president under the name "Null" and Sumire has reinvented herself as "Yasha" (夜叉) and formed her own group, the Hyakki Yagyō (百鬼夜行).

=== Majimuri Gakuen: Loudness (2021) ===
In July 2021, a third stage play was announced, titled Majimuri Gakuen: LOUDNESS (マジムリ学園-Loudness), and will be presented as a combination of stage play and concert.

The play is set two years after the events of the drama, with Nero and König set to confront Null, who has become the leader of Arashigaoka Student council.
