= Everyday, Katyusha =

- Regular Edition cover featuring Atsuko Maeda and Tomomi Itano

Single by AKB48

from the album 1830m
- B-side: "Kore Kara Wonderland"; "Yankee Soul"; "Hito no Chikara"; "Anti"
- Released: May 25, 2011
- Recorded: 2011
- Genre: J-pop
- Length: 5:14
- Label: You, Be Cool! / King
- Songwriter(s): Yasushi Akimoto
- Producer(s): Yasushi Akimoto

AKB48 singles chronology
"Sakura no Ki ni Narō" (2011)	"Everyday, Katyusha" (2011)	"Flying Get" (2011)

Music videos
- Everyday, Katyusha on YouTube
- Kore kara Wonderland (preview) on YouTube

"Everyday, Katyusha" (Everyday、カチューシャ, Eburidei, Kachūsha) is the 21st single by Japanese idol girl group AKB48, released on May 25, 2011.

== Release information ==
The first presses of the single came with a ticket to vote in the AKB48 22nd Single Senbatsu Election (to choose the members to be featured in the next AKB48's single, to be released in the summer).

"Everyday, Katyusha" was used as the theme song for the film Moshidora, which stars AKB48 members Atsuko Maeda and Minami Minegishi, and the song "Yankee Soul" will be the title track for the television drama Majisuka Gakuen 2 by TV Tokyo. It was announced that part of the proceeds from this album will be donated to help the victims of the 2011 Tōhoku earthquake and tsunami. "Everyday, Katyusha" sold a total of 942,475 copies on its release day alone, and it set a new sales record with sales of 1.33 million albums on its debut week.

== Track listing ==
All lyrics are written by Yasushi Akimoto.

Type-A CD
No.	Title	Music	Length
1.	"Everyday, Katyusha (Everyday、カチューシャ, Everyday, Kachūsha)"	Yoshimasa Inoue	5:14
2.	"Korekara Wonderland (これからWonderland)"	Inoue	4:27
3.	"Yankee Soul (ヤンキーソウル, Yankī Sōru)"	TJMixx	3:32
4.	"Everyday, Katyusha" (off vocal version)	Inoue	5:14
5.	"Korekara Wonderland" (off vocal version)	Inoue	4:27
6.	"Yankee Soul" (off vocal version)	TJMixx	3:32

Type-A DVD
No.	Title	Length
1.	"Everyday, Katyusha Music Clip"
2.	"Korekara Wonderland Music Clip"
3.	"Yankee Soul Music Clip"
4.	"Everyday, Katyusha Music Clip" (Drama version)
5.	"AKB48 Cho no Zoku: Short Con Cho 3 Renpatsu! (AKB48ちょの続・ショートコンちょ3連発!)" (Type-A)

All lyrics are written by Yasushi Akimoto, except credited below.

Type-B CD
No.	Title	Lyrics	Music	Length
1.	"Everyday, Katyusha"		Yoshimasa Inoue	5:14
2.	"Korekara Wonderland"		Inoue	4:27
3.	"Hito no Chikara (人の力; Power of the People)"	Junjiro Seki	Seki	4:28
4.	"Everyday, Katyusha" (off vocal version)		Inoue	5:14
5.	"Korekara Wonderland" (off vocal version)		Inoue	4:27
6.	"Hito no Chikara" (off vocal version)	Seki	Seki	4:28

Type-B DVD
No.	Title	Length
1.	"Everyday, Katyusha Music Clip"
2.	"Korekara Wonderland Music Clip"
3.	"Hito no Chikara Music Clip"
4.	"Everyday, Katyusha Music Clip" (Dance version)
5.	"AKB48 Cho no Zoku: Short Con Cho 3 Renpatsu! (AKB48ちょの続・ショートコンちょ3連発!)" (Type-B)

All lyrics are written by Yasushi Akimoto, except listed below.

Theater Edition CD
No.	Title	Lyrics	Music	Length
1.	"Everyday, Katyusha"		Yoshimasa Inoue	5:14
2.	"Korekara Wonderland"		Inoue	4:27
3.	"Anti (アンチ, Anchi)"	Tadashi Tsukida	Tsukida	4:11
4.	"Everyday, Katyusha" (off vocal version)		Inoue	5:14
5.	"Korekara Wonderland" (off vocal version)		Inoue	4:27
6.	"Anti" (off vocal version)		Tsukida	4:11

== Contributing members ==
=== "Everyday, Katyusha" ===
Center: Atsuko Maeda

- Team A: Aika Ota, Asuka Kuramochi, Haruna Kojima, Rino Sashihara, Mariko Shinoda, Aki Takajo, Minami Takahashi, Atsuko Maeda
- Team K: Tomomi Itano, Yuko Oshima, Ayaka Kikuchi, Minami Minegishi, Sae Miyazawa, Yui Yokoyama
- Team B: Tomomi Kasai, Yuki Kashiwagi, Rie Kitahara, Mika Komori, Sumire Sato, Yuka Masuda, Miho Miyazaki, Mayu Watanabe
- Team S (SKE48): Jurina Matsui, Rena Matsui
- Team N (NMB48): Sayaka Yamamoto, Miyuki Watanabe

=== "Korekara Wonderland" ===
- Team A: Haruna Kojima, Rino Sashihara, Mariko Shinoda, Aki Takajo, Minami Takahashi, Atsuko Maeda
- Team K: Tomomi Itano, Yuko Oshima, Minami Minegishi, Sae Miyazawa, Yui Yokoyama
- Team B: Tomomi Kasai, Yuki Kashiwagi, Rie Kitahara, Mayu Watanabe

=== "Yankee Soul" ===
- Team A: Aika Ota, Asuka Kuramochi, Haruna Kojima, Rino Sashihara, Mariko Shinoda, Aki Takajo, Minami Takahashi, Atsuko Maeda, Ami Maeda
- Team K: Sayaka Akimoto, Tomomi Itano, Yuko Oshima, Ayaka Kikuchi, Moeno Nito, Minami Minegishi, Sae Miyazawa, Yui Yokoyama
- Team B: Tomomi Kasai, Yuki Kashiwagi, Rie Kitahara, Mika Komori, Sumire Sato, Miho Miyazaki, Mayu Watanabe
- Team Kenkyuusei: Mina Oba, Haruka Shimazaki, Haruka Shimada, Mariya Nagao, Suzuran Yamauchi, Miori Ichikawa
- Team S (SKE48): Jurina Matsui, Rena Matsui

=== "Hito no Chikara" ===
"Hito no Chikara " was performed by Undergirls. The center performers are Amina Sato and Haruka Nakagawa.

- Team A: Misaki Iwasa, Shizuka Oya, Haruka Katayama, Haruka Nakagawa, Chisato Nakata, Sayaka Nakaya, Natsumi Matsubara
- Team K: Mayumi Uchida, Ayaka Umeda, Miku Tanabe, Tomomi Nakatsuka, Reina Fujie, Sakiko Matsui, Rumi Yonezawa
- Team B: Haruka Ishida, Kana Kobayashi, Amina Sato, Natsuki Sato, Mariya Suzuki, Rina Chikano, Natsumi Hirajima
- Team Kenkyuusei: Miyu Takeuchi, Mariko Nakamura, Anna Mori, Shiori Nakamata
- Team S (SKE48): Kumi Yagami
- Team KII (SKE48): Akane Takayanagi, Manatsu Mukaida
- Team N (NMB48): Nana Yamada

=== "Anti" ===
"Anti" was performed by Team Kenkyūsei which consisted of the following members:

- 9th Generation: Mina Oba, Haruka Shimazaki, Haruka Shimada, Miyu Takeuchi, Mariya Nagao, Mariko Nakamura, Anna Mori, Suzuran Yamauchi
- 10th Generation: Maria Abe, Rina Izuta, Miori Ichikawa, Anna Iriyama, Rena Kato, Yuki Kanazawa, Marina Kobayashi, Nakamata Shiori, Nana Fujita
- 11th Generation: Sara Ushikubo, Rina Kawaei, Natsuki Kojima, Shihori Suzuki, Wakana Natori, Ayaka Morikawa, Nau Yamaguchi

== Reception ==
"Everyday, Katyusha" set a new sales record for singles in Japan, selling a total of 1.334 million singles on its debut week and beating the previous record set by Mr. Children in February 1996. The single is also the third million-selling single by the band AKB48, together with their previous singles "Sakura no Ki ni Narō" with sales of 1.15 million album and "Beginner" with sales of 1.07 million albums. The single also crossed the 1.5 million album sales mark, becoming the fifth single by a female group to cross that mark. It also achieved that mark at a record pace, and it also became the first single since 2005 to achieve that mark.

== Charts and certifications ==
=== Charts ===
Weekly charts	Peak position
Billboard Japan Hot 100	1
Oricon daily singles	1
Oricon weekly singles	1
Oricon monthly singles	1
Oricon yearly singles (2011)	2
Oricon yearly singles (2012)	330
RIAJ Digital Track Chart weekly top 100	1

Year-end charts	Peak position
Billboard Japan Hot 100	1

=== Sales and certifications ===
Region	Certification	Certified units/sales
Japan (RIAJ)	Million	1,586,840
Japan (RIAJ) digital	Million	1,000,000^{*}
^{*} Sales figures based on certification alone.

== Awards ==
Year	Ceremony	Award	Nominated work	Result
2011	Billboard Japan Music Awards	Hot 100 of the Year	"Everyday, Katyusha"	Won
2011	Billboard Japan Music Awards	Hot 100 Single Sales of the Year	"Everyday, Katyusha"	Won
2012	Japan Gold Disc Award	Single of the Year	"Everyday, Katyusha"	Won
2013	31st JASRAC Awards	Bronze Award	"Everyday, Katyusha"	Won
