= So Long! (AKB48 song) =

- Type A single cover

Single by AKB48

from the album Tsugi no Ashiato
- B-side: "Waiting Room"
- Released: February 20, 2013
- Genre: J-pop
- Label: You, Be Cool! / King
- Songwriter: Yasushi Akimoto
- Producer: Yasushi Akimoto

AKB48 singles chronology
"Eien Pressure" (2012)	"So Long!" (2013)	"Sayonara Crawl" (2013)

Music video
- "So Long!" on YouTube "Waiting Room" (preview) on YouTube

"So Long!" (stylized as "So long !" with a space before the exclamation mark) is the 30th major single by the Japanese idol girl group AKB48. It is also AKB48's sixth cherry blossom-themed single, and its first single of 2013. This single was released in Japan on February 20 in four different versions.

The 64-minute-long music video for the title track is directed by director Nobuhiko Obayashi. The Nippon Television network aired a 3-episode special television drama based on the title track from 11–13 February 2013. This is also the last single to feature long-time members Tomomi Kasai, Moeno Nitō, and Sayaka Nakaya.

== Composition ==
As with many of AKB48's songs, the lyrics were written by Yasushi Akimoto. They begin:

"So long! …微笑んで So long! …じゃあ またね, 枝にいくつかの硬い蕾(つぼみ) 桜前線 まだ来ないのに"

which is romanized as: "So long! …hohoende! So long! ..jā matane, eda ni ikutsu ka no katai tsubomi, sakurazensen mada konainoni" and translated as: "So long! ..smiling! So long! ..yeah bye for now, in the branch some hard buds, before the cherry tree still doesn't come"

== Music video ==
The music video for the song "So Long!" is directed by Nobuhiko Obayashi and produced by Yasushi Akimoto. With a duration of 64 minutes, it is AKB48's longest music video to date. Shot on location at Chuetsu High School in Niigata Prefecture, this music video revolves around the students at the school.

Mayu Watanabe plays the role of Yume (lit: Dreams), a girl that dreams of becoming an actress. This is Watanabe's first "center" role in an AKB48 music video. SKE48 member Jurina Matsui plays the role of Mirai (lit: Future), a student who transferred to the school from Minamisoma, Fukushima Prefecture after the 2011 Tōhoku earthquake and tsunami. Other supporting cast includes members Haruka Shimazaki (Ayu), Yuko Oshima (Shiori) (lit: Bookmark), Minami Takahashi (Sora) (lit: Sky), Tomomi Itano (Akari) and Yuki Kashiwagi (Kii).

All the students at the school lend their support to Mirai because all of them have had experienced the 2004 Chūetsu earthquake and understand her predicament. Over time, Mirai starts to make friends with the other students in the school and become emotionally stronger. Singer Mickey Curtis makes a special guest appearance in this video.

== Release ==
The title track of this single was first unveiled on Tokyo Broadcasting System's Kayo Kyoku music programme on 22 January 2013. A six-minute version of the music video was subsequently unveiled on 24 January 2013 during the AKB48 Request Hour Set List Best 100 2013 performance series. "So Long!" was released in Japan on February 20, 2013 in four different versions: Type A, Type K, Type B, and the Theater versions.

== Track listing ==
=== Type-A ===
CD
No.	Title	Artist(s)	Length
1.	"So Long!"
2.	"Waiting Room" (アンダーガールズ)	Under Girls
3.	"Ruby"	Team A
4.	"So Long! off vocal ver."
5.	"Waiting Room off vocal ver."
6.	"Ruby off vocal ver."

DVD
No.	Title	Length
1.	"So Long Music Video"
2.	"Waiting Room Music Video"
3.	"Ruby Music Video"
4.	"Dai 2 Kai AKB48 Kohaku Taiko Uta Gassen: Soshu Hen"

=== Type-K ===
CD
No.	Title	Artist(s)	Length
1.	"So Long!"
2.	"Waiting Room" (アンダーガールズ)	Under Girls
3.	"Yūhi Marie" (夕陽マリー)	Team K
4.	"So Long! off vocal ver."
5.	"Waiting Room off vocal ver."
6.	"Yūhi Marie off vocal ver."

DVD
No.	Title	Length
1.	"So Long! Music Video"
2.	"Waiting Room Music Video"
3.	"Yūhi Marie Music Video"
4.	"Dai 2 Kai AKB48 Kohaku Taiko Uta Gassen: Akagumi Digest"

=== Type-B ===
CD
No.	Title	Artist(s)	Length
1.	"So Long!"
2.	"Waiting Room" (アンダーガールズ)	Under Girls
3.	"Sokode Inu no Unchi Funjau kane?" (そこで犬のうんち踏んじゃうかね?)	Team B
4.	"So Long! off vocal ver."
5.	"Waiting Room off vocal ver."
6.	"Sokode Inu no Unchi Funjau kane? off vocal ver."

DVD
No.	Title	Length
1.	"So Long! Music Video"
2.	"Waiting Room Music Video"
3.	"Sokode Inu no Unchi Funjau kane? Music Video"
4.	"Dai 2 Kai AKB48 Kohaku Taiko Uta Gassen: Shirogumi Digest"
5.	"Sugar Rush Music Video"

=== Theater Edition ===
CD
No.	Title	Artist(s)	Length
1.	"So Long!"		6:05
2.	"Waiting Room" (アンダーガールズ)	Under Girls	4:33
3.	"Tsuyoi Hana" (強い花)	Trainees
4.	"So Long! off vocal ver."
5.	"Waiting Room off vocal ver."
6.	"Tsuyoi Hana off vocal ver."

== Members ==
=== "So Long!" ===
Center: Mayu Watanabe

- Team A: Mariko Shinoda, Minami Takahashi, Mayu Watanabe, Yui Yokoyama
- Team K: Tomomi Itano, Yūko Ōshima
- Team B: Yuki Kashiwagi, Haruna Kojima, Haruka Shimazaki
- AKB48 Trainees: Minami Minegishi
- SKE48 Team S / AKB48 Team K: Jurina Matsui, Rie Kitahara
- SKE48 Team S: Rena Matsui
- NMB48 Team N / AKB48 Team B: Miyuki Watanabe
- NMB48 Team N: Sayaka Yamamoto
- HKT48 Team H: Rino Sashihara

=== "Waiting Room" ===
The song is performed by Under Girls.

Center: Rina Kawaei, Meru Tashima

- Team A: Anna Iriyama, Ryoka Oshima, Rina Kawaei, Ayaka Kikuchi, Juri Takahashi
- Team K: Mariya Nagao, Haruka Shimada
- Team B: Mina Oba, Rena Katō, Reina Fujie
- SKE48 Team S: Yuria Kizaki, Nanako Suga, Akari Suda
- SKE48 Team E: Kanon Kimoto, Nao Furuhata
- NMB48 Team N: Nana Yamada
- NMB48 Team M: Fūko Yagura
- NMB48 Team BII: Shu Yabushita
- HKT48 Team H: Aika Ota, Haruka Kodama, Sakura Miyawaki
- HKT48 Trainees: Meru Tashima

=== "Ruby" ===
- Team A: Karen Iwata, Rina Izuta, Anna Iriyama, Ryōka Ōshima, Tomomi Kasai (Last Single), Rina Kawaei, Ayaka Kikuchi, Riho Kotani, Marina Kobayashi, Sumire Satō, Mariko Shinoda, Juri Takahashi, Minami Takahashi, Yūka Tano, Tomomi Nakatsuka, Shiori Nakamata, Moeno Nitō (Last Single), Sakiko Matsui, Ayaka Morikawa, Yui Yokoyama, Mayu Watanabe

=== "Yūhi Marie" ===
- Team K: Sayaka Akimoto, Maria Abe, Tomomi Itano, Yūko Ōshima, Mayumi Uchida, Rie Kitahara, Asuka Kuramochi, Kana Kobayashi, Amina Satō, Haruka Shimada, Shihori Suzuki, Rina Chikano, Chisato Nakata, Sayaka Nakaya (Last Single), Mariya Nagao, Nana Fujita, Ami Maeda, Jurina Matsui, Natsumi Matsubara, Miho Miyazaki, Tomu Muto

=== "Sokode Inu no Unchi Funjau kane?" ===
- Team B: Anna Ishida, Haruka Ishida, Miori Ichikawa, Misaki Iwasa, Ayaka Umeda, Mina Ōba, Shizuka Ōya, Yuki Kashiwagi, Haruka Katayama, Rena Katō, Natsuki Kojima, Haruna Kojima, Mika Komori, Haruka Shimazaki, Miyu Takeuchi, Miku Tanabe, Mariko Nakamura, Wakana Natori, Misato Nonaka, Reina Fujie, Minami Minegishi, Suzuran Yamauchi, Miyuki Watanabe

=== "Tsuyoi Hana" ===
- Trainees: Miyu Omori, Yukari Sasaki, Rina Hirata, Moe Aigasa, Saho Iwatate, Ayano Umeta, Ayaka Okada, Saki Kitazawa, Ayana Shinozaki, Yurina Takashima, Yuiri Murayama, Shinobu Mogi, Hikari Hashimoto, Mako Kojima, Mitsuki Maeda, Miki Nishino, Nana Okada, Natsuki Uchiyama

== Charts ==
=== Billboard charts ===
Chart (2013)	Peak position
Japan (Billboard Japan Hot 100)	1
Japan (Recochoku)	1

=== Oricon charts ===
Release	Oricon Singles Chart	Peak position	Debut sales (copies)	Sales total (copies)
February 20, 2013	Daily Chart	1	817,530	1,126,674
February 20, 2013	Weekly Chart	1	1,035,986	1,126,674
February 20, 2013	Monthly Chart	1	1,086,389	1,126,674

=== G-music (Taiwan) ===
Chart	Peak position
Combo	16

=== Year-end charts ===
Chart (2013)	Position
Billboard Japan Hot 100	6
Billboard Japan Hot Singles Sales	5
Oricon yearly singles	4
