= Uza (song) =

- Type-A Regular Edition cover

Single by AKB48

from the album Tsugi no Ashiato
- B-side: "Tsugi no Season"; "Kodoku no Hoshizora" (Type-A); "Scrap & Build" (Type-K); "Seigi no Mikata ja Nai Hero" (Type-B); "Otona e no Michi" (Theater Edition)
- Released: October 31, 2012 (Japan)
- Genre: J-pop, electropop
- Label: You, Be Cool! / King
- Composer: Yoshimasa Inoue
- Lyricist: Yasushi Akimoto
- Producer: Yasushi Akimoto

AKB48 singles chronology
"Gingham Check" (2012)	"Uza" (2012)	"Eien Pressure" (2012)

AKB48 songs singles chronology
"Sugar Rush" (2012)

Music videos
- Uza (preview) on YouTube
- Uza (Dance Ver.) on YouTube
- Tsugi no Season (preview) on YouTube

"Uza" (stylized in Japanese as "UZA", meaning "Annoying" and pronounced "oo-zah") is the 28th major single by the Japanese female idol group AKB48, released in Japan on October 31, 2012.

== Background ==
The single was first announced on Yasushi Akimoto's Google+ and the title song premiered live on September 18, 2012, at the AKB48's rock-paper-scissors tournament at Nippon Budokan. This is also the first single without ace Maeda Atsuko, and this is also the first senbatsu participation of Sakura Miyawaki.

Mayu Watanabe was originally one of the centers, along with Jurina Matsui, however due to heavy choreography involved in this song, Yuko Oshima, a more experienced dancer, later replaced Watanabe's center position.

It was released in four versions: Type-A, Type-K, Type-B, and Theater Edition.

The music video for the title song was directed by Joseph Kahn, the director of the music video for "Gingham Check".

== Track listing ==
=== Type-A ===
CD
No.	Title	Artist(s)	Length
1.	"Uza" (UZA, "Annoying")
2.	"Tsugi no Season" (次のSeason, "Next Season")	Under Girls
3.	"Kodoku na Hoshizora" (孤独な星空, "Lonely Starry Sky")	New Team A
4.	"Uza off vocal ver."
5.	"Tsugi no Season off vocal ver."
6.	"Kodoku no Hoshizora off vocal ver."

DVD
No.	Title	Length
1.	"Uza Music Video"
2.	"Uza Music Video -Dance ver.-"
3.	"Tsugi no Season Music Video"
4.	"Kodoku na Hoshizora Music Video"
5.	"Gingham Check Music Video (Directed by Eiki Takahashi)" (ギンガムチェック Music Video 〜高橋栄樹監督ver.〜)

=== Type-K ===
CD
No.	Title	Artist(s)	Length
1.	"Uza" (UZA, "Annoying")
2.	"Tsugi no Season" (次のSeason, "Next Season")	Under Girls
3.	"Scrap & Build" (スクラップ&ビルド)	New Team K
4.	"Uza off vocal ver."
5.	"Tsugi no Season off vocal ver."
6.	"Scrap & Build off vocal ver."

DVD
No.	Title	Length
1.	"Uza Music Video"
2.	"Uza Music Video -Dance ver.-"
3.	"Tsugi no Season Music Video"
4.	"Scrap & Build Music Video"
5.	"Gingham Check Music Video (Directed by Eiki Takahashi)" (ギンガムチェック Music Video 〜高橋栄樹監督ver.〜)

=== Type-B ===
CD
No.	Title	Artist(s)	Length
1.	"Uza" (UZA, "Annoying")
2.	"Tsugi no Season" (次のSeason, "Next Season")	Under Girls
3.	"Seigi no Mikata ja Nai Hero" (正義の味方じゃないヒーロー, "Hero who is not on the Side of Justice")	New Team B
4.	"Uza off vocal ver."
5.	"Tsugi no Season off vocal ver."
6.	"Seigi no Mikata ja Nai Hero off vocal ver."

DVD
No.	Title	Length
1.	"Uza Music Video"
2.	"Uza Music Video -Dance ver.-"
3.	"Tsugi no Season Music Video"
4.	"Seigi no Mikata ja Nai Hero Music Video"
5.	"Gingham Check Music Video (Directed by Eiki Takahashi)" (ギンガムチェック Music Video 〜高橋栄樹監督ver.〜)

=== Theater Edition ===
CD
No.	Title	Artist(s)	Length
1.	"Uza" (UZA, "Annoying")
2.	"Tsugi no Season" (次のSeason, "Next Season")	Under Girls
3.	"Otona e no Michi" (大人への道, "Road to Adulthood")	Kenkyūsei
4.	"Uza off vocal ver."
5.	"Tsugi no Season off vocal ver."
6.	"Otona e no Michi off vocal ver." (大人への道 off vocal ver.)

== Members ==
=== "Uza" ===
Center: Yūko Ōshima, Jurina Matsui.

- Team A: Mariko Shinoda, Minami Takahashi, Mayu Watanabe
- Team K: Tomomi Itano, Yūko Ōshima
- Team B: Haruna Kojima, Yuki Kashiwagi, Haruka Shimazaki, Minami Minegishi
- AKB48 Team A / NMB48 Team N: Yui Yokoyama
- SKE48 Team S / AKB48 Team K: Jurina Matsui
- SKE48 Team S: Rena Matsui
- NMB48 Team N / AKB48 Team B: Miyuki Watanabe
- NMB48 Team N: Sayaka Yamamoto
- HKT48 Team H: Rino Sashihara, Sakura Miyawaki

=== "Tsugi no Season" ===
The song is performed by Under Girls. Center: Rina Kawaei

- Team A: Karen Iwata, Yūka Tano, Anna Iriyama, Juri Takahashi, Rina Kawaei, Ryōka Ōshima
- Team K: Mariya Nagao, Tomu Muto
- Team B: Rena Katō, Miori Ichikawa, Miyu Takeuchi
- SKE48 Team S: Yuria Kizaki
- SKE48 Team KII: Manatsu Mukaida
- SKE48 Team E: Kanon Kimoto
- NMB48 Team N: Nana Yamada
- HKT48 Team H: Haruka Kodama

=== "Kodoku na Hoshizora" ===
- New Team A: Karen Iwata, Rina Izuta, Anna Iriyama, Ryōka Ōshima, Tomomi Kasai, Rina Kawaei, Ayaka Kikuchi, Riho Kotani, Marina Kobayashi, Sumire Satō, Natsuki Satō, Mariko Shinoda, Juri Takahashi, Minami Takahashi, Yūka Tano, Tomomi Nakatsuka, Shiori Nakamata, Moeno Nitō, Sakiko Matsui, Ayaka Morikawa, Yui Yokoyama, Mayu Watanabe

=== "Scrap & Build" ===
- New Team K: Sayaka Akimoto, Maria Abe, Tomomi Itano, Yūko Ōshima, Mayumi Uchida, Rie Kitahara, Asuka Kuramochi, Kana Kobayashi, Amina Satō, Haruka Shimada, Shihori Suzuki, Rina Chikano, Chisato Nakata, Sayaka Nakaya, Mariya Nagao, Nana Fujita, Ami Maeda, Yuka Masuda, Jurina Matsui, Natsumi Matsubara, Kaoru Mitsumune, Miho Miyazaki, Tomu Muto

=== "Seigi no Mikata ja Nai Hero" ===
- New Team B: Anna Ishida, Haruka Ishida, Miori Ichikawa, Misaki Iwasa, Ayaka Umeda, Mina Ōba, Shizuka Ōya, Yuki Kashiwagi, Haruka Katayama, Rena Katō, Natsuki Kojima, Haruna Kojima, Mika Komori, Haruka Shimazaki, Miyu Takeuchi, Miku Tanabe, Mariko Nakamura, Wakana Natori, Misato Nonaka, Reina Fujie, Minami Minegishi, Suzuran Yamauchi, Miyuki Watanabe

=== "Otona e no Michi" ===
The song is performed by kenkyūsei (trainees).

Moe Aigasa, Saho Iwatate, Natsuki Uchiyama, Ayano Umeta, Miyū Omori, Ayaka Okada, Nana Okada, Saki Kitazawa, Mako Kojima, Erena Saeed Yokota, Yukari Sasaki, Ayana Shinozaki, Yurina Takashima, Miki Nishino, Hikari Hashimoto, Rina Hirata, Mitsuki Maeda, Yuiri Murayama, Shinobu Mogi

== Charts ==
=== Oricon ===
Release	Oricon Singles Chart	Peak position	Debut sales (copies)	Sales total (copies)
October 31, 2012	Daily Chart	1	884,602	1,257,867
October 31, 2012	Weekly Chart	1	1,128,696	1,257,867
October 31, 2012	Monthly Chart	1	1,128,696	1,257,867
October 31, 2012	Yearly Chart	4	1,215,079	1,257,867

=== G-music (Taiwan) ===
Chart	Peak position
Combo	20
