= Kyabasuka Gakuen =

Japanese television series

- Promotional poster
- Also known as: Cabasuka Gakuen
- Japanese: キャバすか学園
- Genre: Drama
- Created by: Yasushi Akimoto
- Starring: Sakura Miyawaki; Jurina Matsui
- Theme music composer: Yasushi Akimoto
- Opening theme: "High Tension"
- Country of origin: Japan
- Original language: Japanese
- No. of episodes: 10

Production
- Production companies: Nippon TV; AX-ON; Image Field; AKS

Original release
- Network: Nippon Television
- Release: October 29, 2016 – January 14, 2017

Related
- Majisuka Gakuen

Kyabasuka Gakuen (Japanese: キャバすか学園; lit. 'Cabasuka Academy') is a 2016 Japanese television drama series starring Sakura Miyawaki and Jurina Matsui. It is set after the events of Majisuka Gakuen 4, but Salt actually graduates (rather than not graduate), meaning the events of Majisuka Gakuen 5 (a season where mostly every major yankee student character, including Salt, was killed off in a war between the yankees and yakuza) have never happened. In order to save Majisuka All-Girls High School from shutting down as it had gone bankrupt, the girls decide to open and work at a hostess bar called "Aquarium" (水族館, Suizokukan). It started airing on October 29, 2016 on Nippon Television and concluded on January 14, 2017.

== Cast ==
- Sakura Miyawaki as the character with the same name (Same)
- Yui Yokoyama as Otabe (Maguro)
- Haruka Kodama as Katsuzetsu (Tai)
- Yuria Kizaki as Magic (Gari)
- Nana Okada as Katabutsu (Karei)
- Juri Takahashi as Uonome (Iwashi)
- Ryoka Oshima as Kusogaki (Ankō)
- Mion Mukaichi as Jisedai (Fugu)
- Mako Kojima as Kamisori (Ika)
- Haruka Komiyama as Ikizama (Isoginchaku)
- Rika Nakai as Shūkai (Nodoguro)
- Mio Tomonaga as Bōyomi (Tatsuno-otoshigo)
- Yui Kojina as Mirror (Kiss)
- Jurina Matsui as Center (Kurage)
- Toshio Kakei as Saionji, Cabaret Club Producer
- Suekichi-kun as Satoshi
- Sayaka Yamamoto as Antonio
- Miru Shiroma as Shirogiku
- Fūko Yagura as Kurobara
- Ririka Suto as Tetsugaku
- Nagisa Shibuya as Hachikō
- Tomu Mutō as Tsun
- Saya Kawamoto as Rookie
- Akari Yoshida as Red
- Toshiya Sakai as Satoru Mōri
- Kyosuke Yabe
- Koki Okada
- Akimasa Haraguchi
- Kazumasa Koura
- Ryohei Abe
- Zen Kajiwara

=== Guest appearance ===
- Nanase Nishino as Nogi Female Student (ep.1)
- Mayu Watanabe as Nezumi (Utsubo) (ep.3)
- Yu Inaba as Tsuyoshi Tsujimoto, System Engineer (ep.3 - 6, 10)
- Haruna Kojima as Kojiharu (Konbu) (ep.4)
- Yuki Kashiwagi as either Black / Burakku or a totally different character with the same name (Anago) (ep.4 - 5)
- Maria Abe as probably a character with the same name (ep.5)
- Rena Kato as Dodobusu (Namazu), Fortune Teller (ep.5 - 10)
- Hana Matsuoka as the character with the same name (Wakasagi) (ep.7)
- Rino Sashihara as Scandal / Sukyandaru (ep.8)
- Anna Iriyama as Yoga (Iruka) (ep.8 - 10)
- Kaori Matsumura as the character with same name, Hostess (ep.8, mentioned only)
- Nao Furuhata as the character with same name, Hostess (ep.8, mentioned only, 10)
- Akane Takayanagi as the character with same name, Hostess (ep.8, mentioned only)
- Akari Suda as the character with same name, Hostess (ep.8, mentioned only)
- Sarina Sōda as the character with same name, Hostess (ep.8, mentioned only)
- Haruka Futamura as the character with same name, Hostess (ep.8, mentioned only)
- Haruka Shimazaki as Salt / Soruto (Plankton) (ep.8 - 9)
- Mai Shiraishi as Nogi Female Student (ep.10)
