= Mejiro University =

Private university in Shinjuku, Tokyo, Japan

- 目白大学
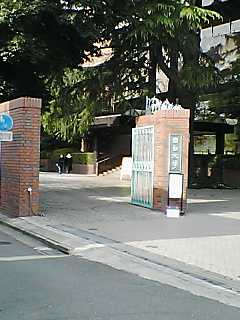
- Type: Private
- Established: 1923
- Location: Shinjuku, Tokyo, Japan
- Campus: Urban
- Website: mejiro.ac.jp

Mejiro University (目白大学, Mejiro Daigaku) is a private university in Shinjuku, Tokyo, Japan. Established in 1923, it was chartered as a women's junior college in 1963, and expanded into a four-year university in 1994. The institution also has facilities in Saitama, Saitama Prefecture, including the Iwatsuki Campus and the National Saitama Hospital Campus.

== History ==
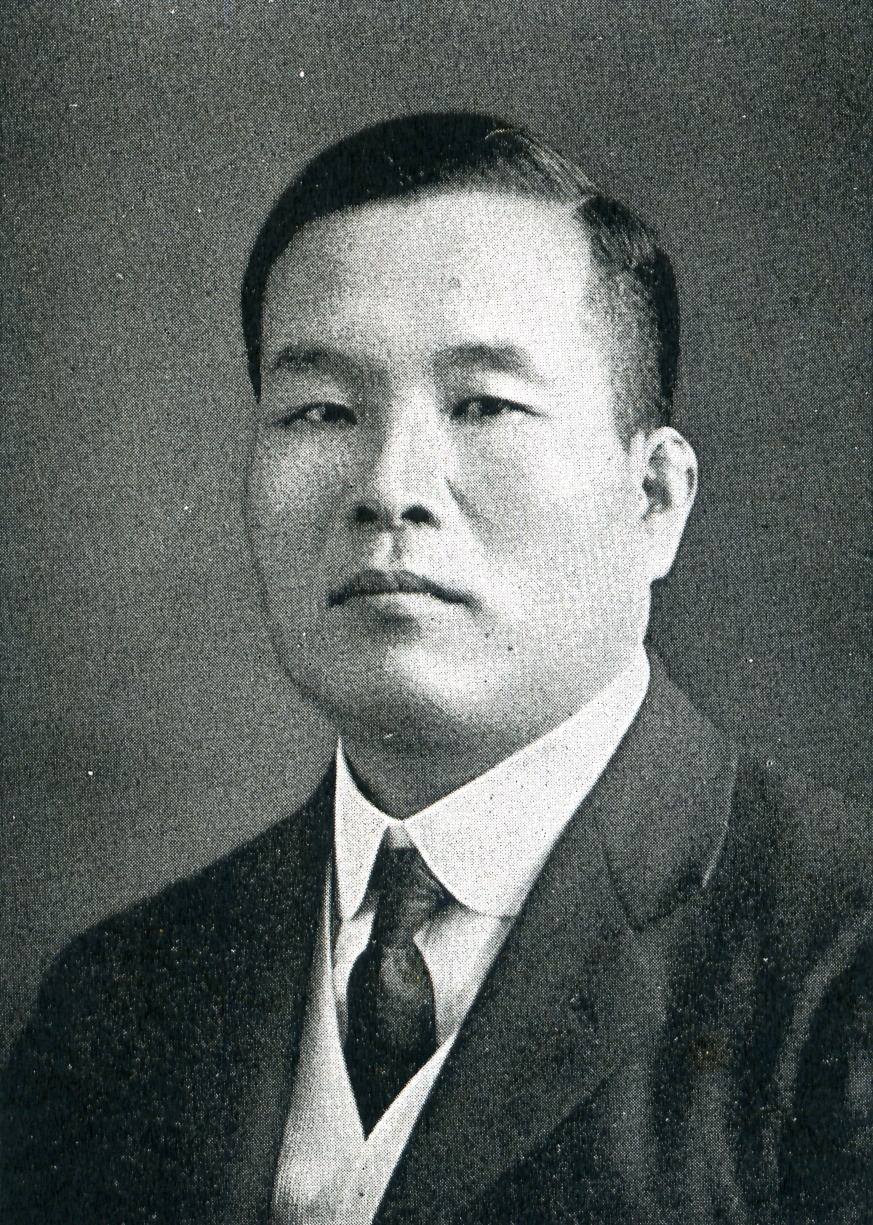
Satō Jūen (1887–1964), the founder of Mejiro University

Mejiro University was founded as Kenshin Gakuen in Ochiai, Tokyo City (present-day Shinjuku) by businessman and politician Satō Jūen (1887-1964) and his wife Fuyu in April 1923. The predecessor of the school was founded 1918 in Kumamoto, Kumamoto Prefecture. Satō Jūen served as the first president of the academy. In 1930, Mejiro Commercial School was established.

In 1963, Mejiro Women's Junior College and the Department of English Literature were established, and the next year, the departments of Japanese Literature and Human Life Science were established.

In 1994, Mejiro University was re-established as a four-year university with the Faculty of Humanities, Department of Regional Culture Studies and Department of Linguistics and Cultural Studies. The Iwatsuki Campus was established in Iwatsuki, Saitama Prefecture the same year. In 1999, Mejiro University Graduate School was established with the Graduate School of International Studies.

Between 2002 and 2007, the university established the faculties of Foreign Languages, Business Administration, Health Sciences, and Nursing, as well as the graduate schools of Psychology, Business Administration, and Life Welfare. In 2008, the Mejiro University Clinic was established, and in 2009, the National Saitama Hospital Campus was established in Wakō, Saitama Prefecture.

The Graduate School of Rehabilitation was established in 2012, and the Faculty of Media was established in 2018. In 2020, the Faculty of Psychology was established.

== Organization ==
=== Faculties ===
- Faculty of Psychology
- Faculty of Human Studies
- Faculty of Sociology
- Faculty of Media
- Faculty of Business Administration
- Faculty of Foreign Languages
- Faculty of Health Sciences
- Faculty of Nursing

=== Graduate schools ===
- Graduate School of Psychology
- Graduate School of Business Administration
- Graduate School of International Studies
- Graduate School of Social Work Services
- Graduate School of Language and Culture Studies
- Graduate School of Nursing
- Graduate School of Rehabilitation

== Notable people ==
=== Notable staff ===
- Agnes Chan, affiliate professor, singer
- Natsue Washizu, professor, singer

=== Notable alumni ===
- Yuu Kashii, actress
- Neko Hiroshi, comedian and marathon runner
- Nachu, media personality
- Ōsaki Hatsune, professional Mahjong player
