= Haruka Shimada =

Japanese businessperson and former idol

- 島田 晴香
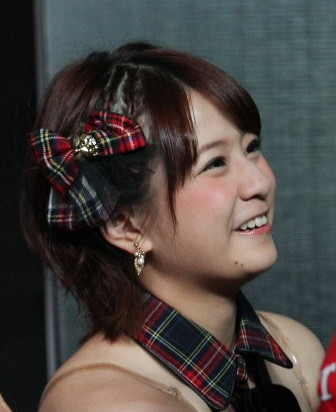
- Haruka Shimada in 2013
- Born: 16 December 1992 (age 33); Atami, Shizuoka Prefecture, Japan
- Occupations: Businessperson; singer (former); actress (former)
- Agent: Flave Entertainment (2009–2017)
- Height: 1.61 m (5 ft 3 in) (2010)
- Spouse: Unknown (m. 2023)
- Children: 1
- Musical career
- Also known as: Harū (はるぅ); Shimagon (しまごん); Shima-chan (島ちゃん); Ura Banchō (裏番長); Gian (ジャイアン, Jaian)
- Years active: 2009–2017
- Formerly of: AKB48 (2009–2017)

Haruka Shimada (島田 晴香, Shimada Haruka; born 16 December 1992) is a Japanese businessperson and former singer and actress. She is a former member of AKB48, and has founded two companies aiming to provide second career options for aspiring and active entertainers.

== Biography ==
Shimada joined AKB48 in 2009. During her time with the group, she had served as the vice-captain of Team K. In April 2017, Shimada announced that she would graduate from the group in September 2017 and retire from the entertainment industry. Her graduation live concert was held on November 13, and she released her photo book the same month. She posted her farewell message on her official Twitter and Instagram accounts on December 31, 2017 and stated that she will only maintain her Instagram account going forward.

In 2018, Shimada moved to London and lived there for about a year to learn English. She worked at an advertising agency after returning to Japan, and went on to establish the company Dct Inc. in May 2021. Drawing from her own experiences, the company offers courses to prepare Japanese idols for the general workforce should they decide to retire from the entertainment industry, considering that they often start out while in school and have little or no work experience outside the industry such as part-time work, although they might have an advantage in communication skills. Former AKB48 members have enrolled in the courses, three of whom found employment in January 2022. She later established a second company named Clover Academy, which offers a combined course of performing arts training and child care qualification for high school graduates who aspire to enter show business, similarly to provide an option for a second career should they later retire.

Shimada also helps manage her family's ryokan, Tachibana, in her hometown of Atami. After the 2021 Atami landslide, she launched a crowdfunding project for reconstruction of the affected areas, which managed to collect 3,331,000 yen.

== Personal life ==
On November 22, 2023, Shimada announced her marriage to a general businessman. On May 12, 2024, she gave birth to her first child.

== AKB48 participation ==
=== Singles ===
Single	Song	Member of	Ref.
"Ponytail to Shushu"	"Boku no Yell"	Theater Girls	
"Chance no Junban"	"Fruits Snow"	Team Kenkyūsei	
"Sakura no Ki ni Narō"	"Kogane Center"	Team Kenkyūsei	
"Everyday, Katyusha"	"Yankee Soul"		
"Everyday, Katyusha"	"Anti"	Team Kenkyūsei	
"Flying Get"	"Seishun to Kizukanai mama"		
"Kaze wa Fuiteiru"	"Vamos"	Under Girls Bara-gumi	
"Kaze wa Fuiteiru"	"Tsubomi-tachi"	Team 4+Kenkyūsei	
"Ue kara Mariko"	"Hashire! Penguin"	Team 4	
"Give Me Five!"	"Hitsujikai no Tabi"	Special Girls B	
"Manatsu no Sounds Good!"			
"Gingham Check"	"Ano Ni no Fūrin"	Waiting Girls	
"Uza"	"Scrap & Build"	Team K	
"Eien Pressure"	"Watashitachi no Reason"		
"So Long!"	"Waiting room"	Under Girls	
"So Long!"	"Yūhi Mary"	Oshima Team K	
"Sayonara Crawl"	"How come?"	Team K	
"Heart Electric"	"Sasameyuki Regret"	Team K	
"Mae shika Mukanee"	"Konjo"	Talking Chimpanzees	
"Labrador Retriever"	"Itoshiki Rival"	Team K	
"Kibōteki Refrain"	"Hajimete no Drive"	Team K	
"Kuchibiru ni Be My Baby"	"Onēsan no Hitorigoto"	Team K	
"Tsubasa wa Iranai"	"Aishū no Trumpeter"	Team K	
"High Tension"	"Better"		

=== Albums ===
Year	Title	Member of
Koko ni Ita Koto	"High school days"	Team Kenkyūsei
Koko ni Ita Koto	"Koko ni Ita Koto"	AKB48+SKE48+SDN48+NMB48
1830m	"Chokkaku Sunshine"	Team 4
1830m	"Aozora yo: Sabishikunai ka?"	AKB48+SKE48+NMB48+HKT48
Tsugi no Ashiato	"Ponkotsu Bruce"	
Tsugi no Ashiato	"Kyōhan-sha"	Team K
Koko ga Rhodes da, Koko de Tobe!	"Conveyor"	Yokoyama Team K
0 to 1 no Aida	"Ai no Shisha"	Team K

=== Other songs ===
Year	Title	Notes
2011	"Hatsukoi wa Minoranai"	Member of Ojarumaru Sisters

=== Stage units ===
Title	Song	Notes
Kenkyūsei: Idol no Yoake	"Itoshiki Natasha"	
Kenkyūsei: Renai Kinshi Jōrei	"Heart Gata Virus"	
Kenkyūsei: Theater no Megami	"Arashi no Yoru ni wa"	
Kenkyūsei: Theater no Megami	"Candy"	
Team B 5th Stage: Theater no Megami	"Romance kakurenbo"	Zenza Girl
Team B 5th Stage: Theater no Megami	"Arashi no Yoru ni wa"	Under Miho Miyazaki
Team B 5th Stage: Theater no Megami	"Candy"	Under Tomomi Kasai
Team B 5th Stage: Theater no Megami	"Locker Room Boy"	Under Rie Kitahara
Team A 6th Stage: Mokugeki-sha	"Miniskirt no Yōsei"	Zensa Girls
Team A 6th Stage: Mokugeki-sha	"Enjō Rosen"	Under Aki Takajo
Team K 6th Stage: Reset	"Remon no Toshigoro"	Zensa Girls
Team K 6th Stage: Reset	"Seifuku Resistance"	Under Tomomi Itano
Team 4 1st Stage: Boku no Taiyō	"Boku to Juliet to Jet Coaster"	
Himawari-gumi 1st Stage: Boku no Taiyō	"Himawari"	
Team S 2nd Stage: Te o tsunaginagara	"Glory days"	
Team K 5th Stage: Gyaku Agari	"End Roll"	
Team K Waiting Kōen II: Saishū Bell Ganaru	"Return Match"	
Team K 7th Stage: Reset	"Ashita no tame ni Kiss o"	
Team K 7th Stage: Reset	"Kiseki wa Maniawanai"	Unit under Haruka Kodama
Masahiro Tanaka: Boku ga koko ni iru Riyū	"Seishun no Ki More Yō"	No3b "Kimi shika" track song, Minami Takahashi or Haruna Kojima's position
Team K 8th Stage: Saishū Bell Ganaru	"Gomen ne: Jewel"	
Team K 8th Stage: Saishū Bell Ganaru	"22-Ri Shimai no Uta"	Unit under Minami Minegishi, Aki Takajo, Mariya Suzuki
Team K 8th Stage: Saishū Bell Ganaru	"Return Match"	Unit under Shinobu Motegi
Revial Kōen: Boku no Taiyō	"Himawari"	Mariya Suzuki, Mihimo Nishino's standby
Team 4 4th Stage: Yume o Shina seru wake ni ikanai	"Kioku no Dilemma"	Under Rina Izuta

== Filmography ==
=== TV dramas ===
Year	Title	Role	Network	Notes	Ref.
2010	Majisuka Gakuen	Majisuka Gakuen student	TV Tokyo	Final Episode	
2011	Majisuka Gakuen 2	Docchi	TV Tokyo		
2012	Shiritsu Bakaleya Koukou	Anne Miyata	NTV		
2012	Majisuka Gakuen 3	Uruseeyo	TV Tokyo		
2013	So long!		NTV	Episode 3	
2015	Majisuka Gakuen 4	Shimada	NTV	Episode 10	
2017	Tōfu Pro-Wres	Yuko Shimada	TV Asahi		

=== Variety ===
Year	Title	Network	Notes	Ref.
2010	Ariyoshi AKB Kyōwakoku	TBS	Irregular appearances	
2010	Shūkan AKB	TV Tokyo	Occasional appearances	
2010	AKBingo!	NTV	Irregular appearances	
2010	AKB48 Neshin TV	Family Gekijo		
2011	AKB48 Conte: Bimyō	Hikari TV Channel		
2012	AKB48 no anta, Dare?	NotTV	Irregular appearances	
2012	Bimyō na Tobira AKB48 no Gachichare	Hikari TV Channel		
2012	AKB Ko Usagi Dōjō	TV Tokyo	Occasional appearances	
2013	HaKaTa Hyakkaten 2-gōkan	NTV		
2013	AKB Kanko-Taishi	Fuji TV One		
2013	AKB48 Conte: Nani mo soko made...	Hikari TV Channel	Irregular appearances	
2014	Renai Sō Senkyo	Fuji TV		
2014	Tentoumu Chu! No Sekai o Muchū ni sa semasu Sengen!	NTV		
2014	SKE48 Ebi Calcio!	NTV		
2014	AKB Shirabe	NTV		
2015	Bokura ga Kangaeru Yoru	Fuji TV	Irregular appearances	
2015	AKB48 Tabi Shōjo	NTV		
2015	AKB48 no Konya wa o Tomari'	NTV		
2015	Sashihara Kaiwaizu	Fuji TV		

=== Other TV programmes (mainly tennis related) ===
Year	Title	Network	Ref.
2015	Sunday Sports	NHK-G	
2015	Kei Nishikori: Chōten no Chōsen ATP Tennis Tour Final Chokuzen Tokushū	NHK BS1	
2015	The Nonfiction (documentary)	Fuji TV	

=== Stage ===
Year	Title	Role	Notes	Ref.
2016	Kenran toka Ranman toka	Sue Kobayashi	(Note: The cast members are Ryoka Oshima, Nana Okada, Shimada and Miho Miyazaki.)	

=== Radio ===
Year	Title	Network	Notes
2011	AKB48 Konya wa Kaeranai...	CBC Radio	Irregular appearances
2011	Kakedase!	NHK Radio 1, NHK World Radio Japan	
2012	AKB48 no All Night Nippon	NBS	Irregular appearances
2013	Listen? Live 4 Life	NCB	Irregular appearances

=== Films ===
Year	Title	Role	Ref.
2012	Ultraman Saga	Hina Hamamatsu	

=== Events ===
Year	Title
2012	Haruka Shimada no Mike 1-Pon Shōbu!! Urusakattara Gomennasai
2012	87th Nikke All Japan Tennis Championships ceremonial first pitch

=== Internet ===
Year	Title	Role	Website	Notes
2015	Majisuka Gakuen 5	Unnamed student	Hulu	Episode 9
2015	AKB48 Team 8!! 2015 Natsu: Zenkoku Jūdan! Shimada-Nakamura-Nakanishi no Team 88 Latch!!		LoGirl	

== Bibliography ==
=== Books ===
Year	Title	ISBN	Notes
2015	Senkyo ttena 'ndarou!? 18-Sai kara no Seiji-gaku Nyūmon	ISBN 978-4-569-82785-8	Co-authored with Masahiko Kōmura
2017	Such a Way of Life (そんな生き方, Sonna Ikikata)	ISBN 9784801912700	Photo book and memoir

=== Calendars ===
Year	Title
2011	Haruka Shimada 2012-nen Calendar
2012	Takujō Haruka Shimada 2013-nen Calendar
2013	Takujō Haruka Shimada Calendar 2014-nen
