= Miku Tanabe =

Japanese idol (born 1992)

- 田名部 生来
- Born: 2 December 1992 (age 33); Ōmihachiman, Shiga Prefecture, Japan
- Other names: Tanamin (たなみん)
- Years active: 2007–
- Agent: AKS
- Height: 164 cm (5 ft 5 in)

Miku Tanabe (田名部 生来, Tanabe Miku; born 2 December 1992, in Ōmihachiman, Shiga Prefecture) is a Japanese idol who is a former member of AKB48's Team B. In April 2017, she announced that she would be "graduating" (or leaving the group). She finally graduated on July 23, 2017.

Tanabe is currently represented by AKS. She formerly belonged to Mousa.

== AKB48 discography ==
=== Singles ===
Single	Song	As
"Baby! Baby! Baby!"	Shonichi	
"Ōgoe Diamond"	Ōgoe Diamond (team B ver.)	Team B
"Namida Surprise!"	Shonichi	Team B
"River"	Hikōkigumo	Theater Girls
"Ponytail to Shushu"	Boku no Yell	Theater Girls
"Beginner"	Nakeru Basho	Diva
Chance no Junban	Alive	Team K
"Sakura no Ki ni Narō"	Area K	Diva
"Everyday, Katyusha"	Hito no Chikara	Under Girls
"Kaze wa Fuiteiru"	Vamos	Under Girls Bara-gumi
"Ue kara Mariko"	Zero Sam Taiyō	Team K
"Give Me Five!"	Jung ya Freud no Baai	Special Girls C
"Manatsu no Sounds Good!"	Guguta su no Sora	
"Gingham Check"	Ano Ni' no Fūrin	Waiting Girls
"Uza"	Seigi no Mikata janai Hero	Team B
"Eien Pressure"	Watashitachi no Reason	
"So Long!"	Sokode Inu no unchi Fun jau ka ne?	Umeda Team B
"Sayonara Crawl"	Romance Kenjū	Team B
"Heart Electric"	Tiny T-shirt	Team B
"Mae shika Mukanee"	Koi toka...	
"Labrador Retriever"	B Garden	Team B
"Kokoro no Placard"	Chewing Gum no Aji ga nakunaru made	Upcoming Girls
"Kibōteki Refrain"	Utaitai	Katorea-gumi
"Kibōteki Refrain"	Loneliness Club	Team B
"Kibōteki Refrain"	Reborn	Team Surprise
"Kuchibiru ni Be My Baby"	Kin no Hane o Motsu Hito yo	Team B
"Tsubasa wa Iranai"	Koi o suruto Baka o Miru	Team B

=== Albums ===
Album	Song	As
Kamikyokutachi	"Kimi to Niji to Taiyō to"	
Koko ni Ita Koto	"Boku ni dekiru koto"	Team K
Koko ni Ita Koto	"Koko ni Ita Koto"	
1830m	"Iede no Yoru"	Team K
1830m	"Aozora yo Sabishikunai ka?"	
Tsugi no Ashiato	"Kanashiki Kinkyori Renai"	Team B
Koko ga Rhodes da, Koko de Tobe!	"To go de"	Kuramochi Team B
0 to 1 no Aida	"Music Junkie"	Team B

=== Stage units ===
Stage	Song
Team B 1st Stage Seishun Girls	Fushidarana Natsu
Team B 2nd Stage Aitakatta	Nagisa no Cherry
Team B 3rd Stage Pajama Drive	Kagami no Naka no Jeanne d 'Arc
Team B 4th Stage Idol no Yoake	Itoshiki Natasha
Theatre G-Rosso Yume o Shina seru wake ni ikanai	Kioku no Dilema
Team K 6th Stage Reset	Ashita no tame ni Kiss o
Team K 6th Stage Reset	Seifuku Resistance
Umeda Team B Waiting	Namida ni Shizumu Taiyō
Umeda Team B Waiting	Gomen ne Jewel
Team B 6th Stage Pajama Drive	Kagami no Naka no Jeanne d 'Arc
Soichiro Tahara Do naru?! Do suru?! AKB48	1994-Nen no Raimei
Team B 7th Stage Tadaima Renai-chū	Junai no Crescendo
Revival Kōen Boku no Taiyō	Boku to Juliet to Jet Coaster
Team 4 4th Stage Yume o Shina seru wake ni ikanai	

== Filmography ==
=== TV dramas ===
Year	Title	Role	Network	Ref.
2010	Majisuka Gakuen	Jumbo	TV Tokyo	
2011	Majisuka Gakuen 2	Jumbo	TV Tokyo	
2013	So long !		NTV	
2013	Shomuni 2013	Galactica 3 Sisters	Fuji TV	
2014	Kōshū Senki Sakuraizar		YBS	

=== Variety ===
Year	Title	Network
2008	AKB 1Ji 59 fun!	NTV
2009	Suiensaa	NHK E
	AKBingo!	NTV
	Shūkan AKB	TV Tokyo
	AKB48 Show!	NHK BS Premium
2011	Pigoo Radio	Pigoo HD, Enta! 371
2011	AKB48 Neshin TV	Family Gekijo
2011	AKB48 Conte "Bimyo"	Hikari TV Channel
2012	Tanabu Club de dōdeshou	BBC
2012	AKB48 no anta, Dare?	Not TV
2012	Bimyo na Tobira AKB48 no Gachichare	Hikari TV Channel
2014	Ariyoshi AKB Kyōwakoku	TBS
2014	Renai Sō Senkyo	Fuji TV
2014	AKB de Arubaito	Fuji TV
2015	Bokura ga Kangaeru Yoru	Fuji TV

=== Films ===
Year	Title	Ref.
2012	Angel Kurumaisu no Natsu	

=== Stage ===
Year	Title	Role
2009	Infinity	Maid
2011	Jikuu Keisatsu Wecker SIGHT	Nurse Miku
2012	I was Light	
2013	Poppoya	Kayo
2013	Goshiki Rocket enpitsu	
2013	Ōmaiga'!	
2013	Hitoribotchi no Chikyūjin feat. Ultra Seven	Yuriko Ichihara
2014	Reimei Roman Tan -Rei Mei Romantic-	
2014	Star	
2014	Yawarakai Fuku o Kite	
2014	Buddy Buddy Buddy Buddy	
2014	Lack.	
2015	Tsunagu!	
2015	Bank Bang Bang Lesson Soon	
2015	Denroku Torimono Jō Koi/Kataki	

=== Radio ===
Year	Title	Network	Ref.
2010	AKB48 Ashita made mō chotto.	NCB	
2010	AKB48 no Zenryoku de Kikanakya Damejan!!	Star Digio	
2011	AKB48 no All Night Nippon	NBS	
2012	Miku Tanabe no Mikku Miku World	FM Shiga	
2014	Ore-tachi Gocha ma ze'!〜 Atsumare Yan Yan	MBS Radio	
2014	Aeon Lake Town presents Chisato Nakata no Chisatalk	Nack 5	
2014	Listen? Live 4 Life	NCB	

=== Video games ===
Year	Title	Role
2008	Moeru Mājan Moejan!	Yan Riku, Hozumi Kano
2010	AKB1/48 Idol to Koi shitara...	Herself
2011	AKB1/48 Idol to Guam de Koi shitara...	Herself

=== Internet ===
Year	Title	Website	Ref.
2012	Tanabu Sōsa-kan, Sennyū seyo!	Toei Mobile	
2014	Miku Tanabe no Konshū no Ippai	Mainichi Sponichi Tap-i AKB Bessatsu	
2014	Hide wa Full Throttle!?	Globe Enterbrains	

=== Events ===
Year	Title	Ref.
2011	Dai 1-kai Kojima Presents Digital Manga Matsuri in Utsunomiya	
2012	Miku Tanabe no Mune Netsu Night	
2014	Yatsui Festival! 2014	
2014	AKB48 37th Single Senbatsu Sō Senkyo 71-i Kinen Event Miku Tanabe Dai Kansha-sai –Kandō! Kangeki!! Kanpai!!!–	
2015	Miku Tanabe Kōshiki Off-kai (Kari)	

== Bibliography ==
=== Magazine, newspaper serials ===
Year	Title
2012	Go! Go! Guitar

=== Calendars ===
Year	Title
2011	Miku Tanabe 2012-nen Calendar
2012	Takujō Miku Tanabe 2013-nen Calendar
2013	Takujō Miku Tanabe 2014-nen Calendar

=== Book ===
Year	Title	Code
2013	Bessatsu Tanabu-jima Miku Tanabe no Otaku Culture Taizen	ISBN 978-4-8002-1028-9
