= Nachu (SDN48 member) =

Japanese tarento (born 1984)

- なちゅ
- Born: 23 December 1984 (age 41); Toyonaka, Osaka, Japan
- Other name: Nachuhamu (なちゅはむ)
- Education: Mejiro University
- Occupation: Tarento
- Years active: 2007–
- Height: 161 cm (5 ft 3 in)

Nachu (なちゅ; born 23 December 1984, in Osaka Prefecture) is a Japanese tarento who is a former member of the female idol group SDN48. Her real name is Natsuko Takekawa (竹川 奈津子, Takekawa Natsuko).

Nachu grew up in Tokyo. She is represented with Watanabe Entertainment.

== SDN48 discography ==
=== Singles ===
SDN48

Single	Song	Member of
"Gagaga"	"Eros no Trigger"	Under Girls A
"Ai, Choseyo"	"Awajishima no Tamanegi"	Under Girls B
"Min-Min-Min"	"Abazare"	Under Girls B
"Kudokinagara Azabujūban duet with Monta Mino"	"Camjatan Bojō"	Under Girls A
"Makeoshimi Congratulation"	"Ue kara Natsuko"	Under Girls A

AKB48

Single	Song
"Ponytail to Shushu"	"Majijo Tappen Blues"

=== Stage units ===
Title	Notes
SDN48 1st Stage: Yūwaku no Garter	Did not participate any units

== Filmography ==
=== Variety ===
Year	Title	Network	Notes	Ref.
	Koi no kara Sawagi	NTV	13th generation	
	Star Kan: Legend	A'! Tōdoroku		
2008	Kusano Kid	TV Asahi		
2009	Waratte Iitomo!	Fuji TV	Appeared at the end of "Detai Dol!"	
	AKBingo!	NTV	Appears as a sample for the punishments in "Mucha-buri Dodgeball"	
	Happy Music	NTV	Quasi-regular	
2010	Suppon no Onna-tachi	TV Asahi	As a member of SDN48	

=== TV dramas ===
Year	Title	Role	Network	Notes
2009	Ten tere Drama: Miracle Shutter		NHK-E	Episode 4
2010	Majisuka Gakuen	Daruma Onizuka	TV Tokyo	
2014	10-Buna Gakkyū-kai	Hiniku	ABC	
2014	Tenchū: Yami no Shioki Hito	Store clerk	Fuji TV	Episode 4
2015	Majisuka Gakuen 4	Daruma Onizuka	NTV	Episode 6

=== Stage ===
Year	Title	Role
	Ō! –Hoero! Sakebe! Uchikudake! Subete no Kubiki o Hikichigire!–	
2013	Pirates Of The Desert	Karla

== Bibliography ==
Year	Title	Notes
	E Everystar "Sakka Tokku Nachu Shōsetsu: Samurai Gyaru"	
	Shukan Shincho "Nachu-ralism"	
2014	Nikkan Gendai "Nachu no ano Paisen ni aita Issu!!"	Irregular serials
