= Haruka Shimazaki =

Japanese singer & actress (born 1994)

- 島崎 遥香
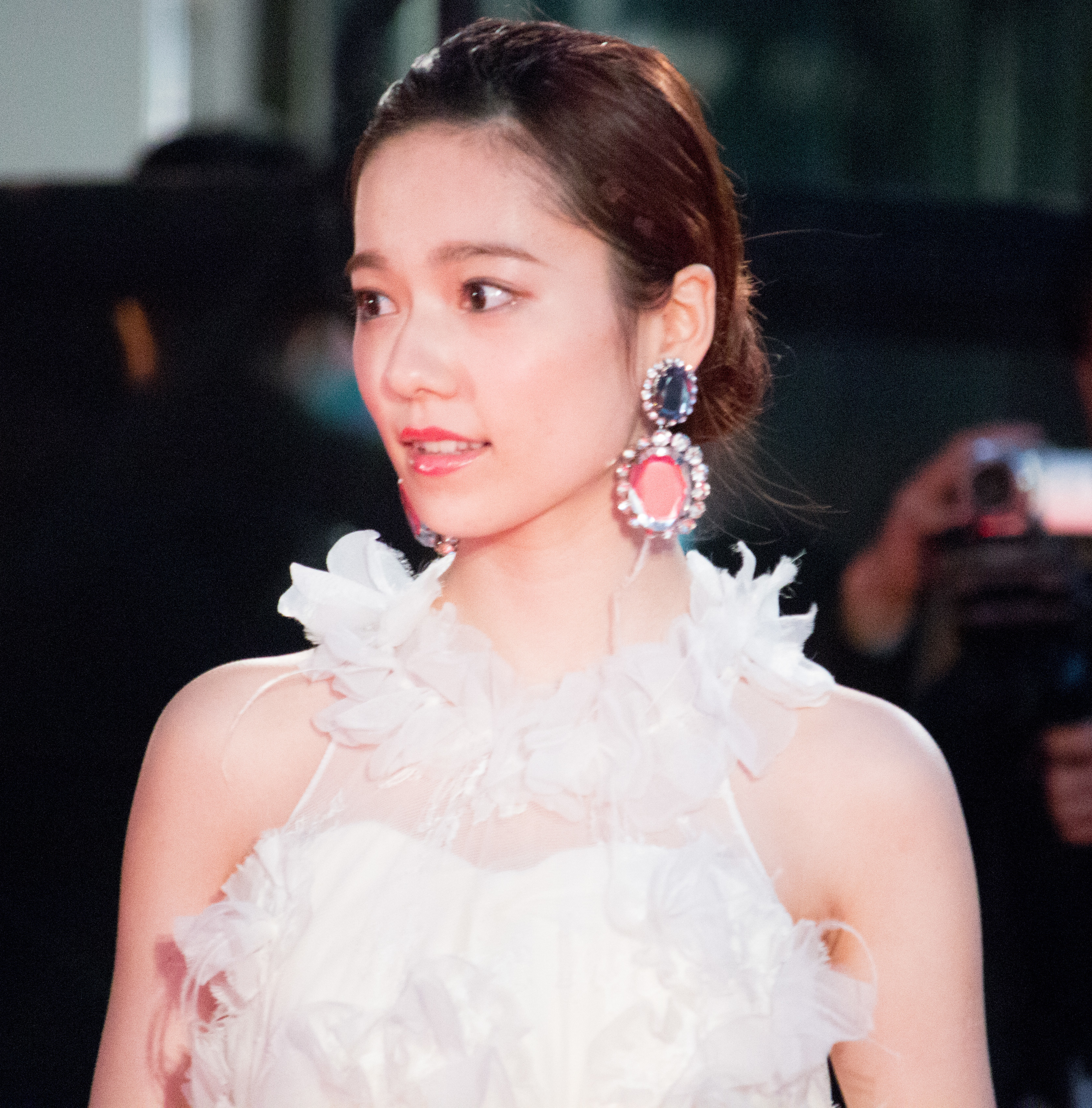
- Shimazaki at the Tokyo International Film Festival in October 2015
- Born: March 30, 1994 (age 32); Saitama Prefecture, Japan
- Occupations: Actress; television personality
- Years active: 2009–present
- Musical career
- Genre: J-pop
- Years active: 2009–2016
- Label: King Records
- Formerly of: AKB48

YouTube information
- Channel: Paruroom
- Years active: 2020–present
- Genre: Vlog
- Subscribers: 325,000
- Views: 36,311,673
- Last updated: 14 July 2026
- Website: Official website

Haruka Shimazaki (島崎 遥香, Shimazaki Haruka; born March 30, 1994) is a Japanese actress, television personality, and former member of the Japanese idol group AKB48. Her supposed apathetic attitude toward idol fans led to the popularity of the buzzword "salty treatment" (塩対応, shio taiō) in Japanese media. Since leaving AKB48 in 2016, Shimazaki has worked as an actress, including roles in Hiyokko, Nisekoi, and Tonde Saitama. She started her own YouTube channel on March 30, 2020.

== Career ==
Haruka Shimazaki was born in Saitama Prefecture, and began her entertainment career in 2009 by successfully auditioning for AKB48 in the 6th Kenkyūsei Audition (9th generation AKB48 audition). Her official nickname, Paruru, was coined by then fellow member Rumi Yonezawa. In the AKB48 17th single senbatsu election, which took place from May to June 2010, Shimazaki ranked 28th, the highest of all trainees. In June 2011 it was announced that she would be promoted to a newly created Team 4. In the AKB48 27th single senbatsu election, which took place from May to June 2012, Shimazaki ranked 23rd. In August 2012 she was transferred to Team B after Team 4 was disbanded. In September 2012 she won the 3rd AKB48 rock-paper-scissors tournament, held in Nippon Budokan, earning the center position in AKB48's single "Eien Pressure," which was released on December 5, 2012.

In 2012, Shimazaki appeared in the movie Gekijōban Shiritsu Bakaleya Kōkō, which was based on the 2012 TV series Shiritsu Bakaleya Kōkō. Later the same year she appeared together with Minami Takahashi in an automated external defibrillator (AED) training session, sponsored by the Japanese Red Cross. On February 23, 2013, she appeared on the cover of the April issue of the Japanese fashion magazine Smart. In October, the fashion magazine CanCam published an article about her signature look, dubbed the "troubled face make-up" (困り顔メイク, komari-gao meiku); this term went on to become one of the Top 50 Japanese Buzzwords of 2013, compiled by the publisher Jiyu Kokuminsha. In 2014, Shimazaki appeared in a recruiting commercial for the Japan Self-Defense Forces. Later that year, the phrase "salty treatment" (塩対応, shio taiō), which referred to her supposed apathetic attitude toward her fans during meet-and-greet events, was again included as one of the Top 50 Japanese Buzzwords for the year.

On October 3, 2016, during a promotional appearance for the brand Baitoru, Shimazaki announced her graduation from AKB48. For the group's 46th single "High Tension", released on November 16, 2016, Shimazaki served as the choreographic center in her final appearance on an AKB48 single. She attended the 67th NHK Kōhaku Uta Gassen and graduated from AKB48 on December 31, 2016. Since graduating from AKB48, Shimazaki has pursued an acting career, playing a supporting role in the 96th NHK asadora Hiyokko, appearing alongside veteran actor Kōji Yakusho in a series of television commercials for the national Jumbo Lottery, and playing the role of Marika Tachibana in Nisekoi, the 2018 film adaptation of the manga by Naoshi Komi.

On her 26th birthday on March 30, 2020, Shimazaki launched her official YouTube channel, called Paruroom (ぱるるーむ). It released a new video every day at 7:00 pm JST. The channel reached 100,000 subscribers on May 2 and has featured other former AKB48 members such as Mariya Nagao and Tomomi Itano. The channel's opening jingle was created by singer-songwriter Hana Tsuruuchi.

On November 14, 2026, Shimazaki announced that she had parted ways with her agency, Big Apple, and become an independent talent. (Note: Shimazaki has previously revealed her independence in a now-deleted video on her YouTube channel, published on July 14, 2020.)

== Personal life ==
Shimazaki has a younger brother. When they were children, both of their parents worked and their grandmother often took care of them. Before she entered the entertainment industry, Shimazaki had aspired to become a veterinarian.

== Filmography ==
=== Films ===
Year	Title	Role	Remarks	Ref(s)
2012	Gekijōban Shiritsu Bakaleya Kōkō	Fumie Shingyōji	Co-lead	
2013	Ataru The First Love & The Last Kill	Rumi Mizuno		
2014	Yo-kai Watch: The Movie	Yukippe (voice)		
2015	Ghost Theater	Sara Mizuki	Lead	
2016	Haunted Campus	Koyomi Nada		
2018	Nisekoi	Marika Tachibana		
2019	Fly Me to the Saitama	Aimi Sugawara		
2022	Nagi's Island	Mizuki Kono		
2022	The Fish Tale	Yurie Tanizaki		
2023	We're Millennials. Got a Problem?: The Movie	Yutori Sakama		

=== TV dramas ===
Year	Title	Role	Remarks	Ref(s)
2010	Majisuka Gakuen	Unnamed student	Final episode	
2011	Majisuka Gakuen 2	Kanburi		
2012	Shiritsu Bakaleya Kōkō	Fumie Shingyōji		
2012	Majisuka Gakuen 3	Paru		
2013	Ataru Special: New York kara no Chōsenjō (ATARU スペシャル ～ニューヨークからの挑戦状!!～)			
2013	So long!			
2013	Fortune Cookie			
2014	Honto ni Atta Kowai Hanashi 15-shunen Special "Sasoi no Mori"	Aoi Sumida		
2015	Majisuka Gakuen 4	Salt		
2015	Majisuka Gakuen 5	Salt		
2015	AKB Horror Night: Adrenaline's Night	Mariko	Ep.24 "Music Box"	
2016	We're Millennials. Got a Problem?	Yutori Sakama		
2016	AKB Love Night: Love Factory	Haruko	Ep. 33 "Marriage Reason"	
2016	Keishichō Nasi Goreng-ka	Kyoko Kazahaya	Lead role	
2016	Kyabasuka Gakuen	Salt/Plankton		
2017	Hiyokko	Yuka Makino		
2018	Repeat (リピート)	Yuko Machida		
2018	Legal V: Ex-lawyer Shoko Takanashi	Rena Mineshima	Episode 4	
2022	Harem Marriage	Koharu Date		
2022	DCU: Deep Crime Unit	Akemi Totsuka	Episode 8	
2026	Mō Ichido Fūfu ni Narimasuka?: Camouflage Fūfu (もう1度夫婦になりますか？〜カモフラージュ夫婦〜; lit. 'Shall We Become a Couple Once More?: Camouflage Couple')	Sawako Shigemoto		
2026	Mikon Sagi (未婚詐欺; lit. 'Unmarried Fraud')	Mao Yuki		

=== TV variety shows ===
- Ariyoshi AKB Kyōwakoku (March 29, 2010 — March 28, 2016, TBS)
- Shūkan AKB (週刊AKB) (August 13, 2010, TV Tokyo)
- AKBingo! (December 22, 2010–present, TV Tokyo)
- AKB48 Nemōsu TV (AKB48ネ申テレビ) (Family Gekijō)
  - Special: Atarashii Jibun ni Annyeong Haseyo Kankoku Kaiheitai (スペシャル〜新しい自分にアニョハセヨ韓国海兵隊〜) (July 17, 2011)
  - Season 7
  - Season 8
- Atsushi Paruru no OO baito! (2015–2016)

== Discography ==
=== Singles with AKB48 ===
Year	No.	Title	Role	Notes
2010	16	"Ponytail to Shushu"	Theatre Girls	Sang "Boku no Yell"
2010	17	"Heavy Rotation"	Under Girls	Sang "Namida no See-Saw game
2010	19	"Chance no Junban"	Team Kenkyusei	Sang "Fruit Snow"
2011	20	"Sakura no Ki ni Narō"	Team Kenkyusei	Sang "Ōgon Center"
2011	21	"Everyday, Katyusha"	Team Kenkyusei	Sang "Anti" & "Yankee Soul"
2011	22	"Flying Get"	Team 4	Sang "Seishun to Kizukanai Mama"
2011	23	"Kaze wa Fuiteiru"	Under Girls, Tem 4 + Kenkyusei	Sang "Kimi no Senaka" & "Tsubomitachi"
2011	24	"Ue kara Mariko"	Team 4	Sang "Hashire! Penguin"
2012	25	"Give Me Five!"	Special Girls A	Sang "New Ship"
2012	26	"Manatsu no Sounds Good!"	A-side	Also sang on "Choudai, Darling!"
2012	27	"Gingham Check"	Under Girls	Sang "Nante Bohemian"
2012	28	"Uza"	A-side, Team B	Also sang "Seigi no Mikata ja Nai Hero "
2012	29	"Eien Pressure"	A-side, Center	Also sang "Totteoki Christmas"
2013	30	"So Long!"	A-side	Also sang on "Sokode Inu no Unchi Funjau kane?" as Team B.
2013	31	"Sayonara Crawl"	A-side, Center	Also sang on "Romance Kenjuu" as Team B & "Haste&Waste" as BKA 48 .
2013	32	"Koi Suru Fortune Cookie"	A-side	Ranked 12th in 2013 General Election. Also sang on "Namida no Sei Janai" and "Saigo no Door".
2013	33	"Heart Electric"	A-side	Also sang on "Tiny Shirt" as Team B.
2013	34	"Suzukake no Ki no Michi de "Kimi no Hohoemi o Yume ni Miru" to Itte Shimattara Bokutachi no Kankei wa Dō Kawatte Shimau no ka, Bokunari ni Nan-nichi ka Kangaeta Ue de no Yaya Kihazukashii Ketsuron no Yō na Mono"	B-side	Sang on "Mosh & Dive" and "Party is over".
2014
2014	35	"Mae shika Mukanee"	A-side	
2014	36	"Labrador Retriever"	A-side	Also sang "Kimi wa Kimagure" .
2014	37	"Kokoro no Placard"	A-side	Also sang "Oshiete Mommy" .
2014	38	"Kibōteki Refrain"	A-side	Also sang "Jūjun na Slave" as Team A.
2015
2015	39	"Green Flash"	A-side	Also sang "Majisuka Fight", "Haru no Hikari Chikazuita Natsu", Hakimono to Kasa no Monogatari.
2015	40	"Bokutachi wa Tatakawanai"	A-side, Center	Also sang "Barebare Bushi" as Wonda Senbatsu & "Kimi no Dai Ni Shō".
2015	41	Halloween Night	A-side	Ranked 9th in 2015 General Election. Also sang "Ippome Ondo", "Yankee Machine Gun", and "Gunzou".
2015	42	Kuchibiru ni Be My Baby	A-side	Also sang "365 Nichi no Kamihikōki", Senaka Kotoba", and "Yasashii place".
2016	43	"Kimi wa Melody"	A-side	Marked as the 10th Anniversary Single. Also sang "Mazariau Mono" as NogizakaAKB and "M.T. ni Sasagu" as Team A.
2016	44	"Tsubasa wa Iranai"	A-side	Also sang "Set me free" as Team A.
2016	45	"Love Trip / Shiawase wo Wakenasai"	A-side	Also sang "Hikari no Naka e" as Baito AKB Paruru Selection.
2016	46	"High Tension"	A-side, Center	Last Single to participate. Also sang "Better" which is her graduation song.

=== Albums ===
Koko ni Ita Koto

- "High School Days" (Team Kenkyūsei)
- "Koko ni Ita Koto" (AKB48+SKE48+SDN48+NMB48)

1830m

- "First Rabbit"
- "Chokkaku Sunshine" (Team 4)
- "Itsuka Mita Umi no Soko" (Up-and-coming Girls)
- "Yasashisa no Chizu"
- "Aozora yo Sabishikunai Ka?" (AKB48 + SKE48 + NMB48 + HKT48)

Tsugi no Ashiato

- "After Rain"
- "Boy Hunt no Houhou Oshiemasu"
- "Boku wa Ganbaru"
- "Ponkotsu Blues"
- "Dōki"
- "Kanashiki Kinkyori Renai"

Koko ga Rhodes da, Koko de Tobe!

- "Ai no Sonzai"
- "Oh! Baby!" (Takahashi Team A)
- "Tomodachi de Irareru Nara"

0 to 1 no Aida

- "Toy Poodle to Kimi no Monogatari"
- "Clap" (Team A)

Thumbnail

- "Ano Hi no Jibun"

=== AKB48 theater acts ===
Team Kenkyūsei "Idol no Yoake"

1. "Kataomoi no Taikakusen" (片思いの対角線)

Team B 4th Stage "Idol no Yoake"

1. "Kataomoi no Taikakusen"
  substitute for Moeno Nitō

Team Kenkyūsei "Renai Kinshi Jōrei"

1. "Tsundere!" (ツンデレ!)

Team A 5th Stage "Renai Kinshi Jōrei"

1. "Squall no Aida ni" (スコールの間に) (dancer)
2. "Manatsu no Christmas Rose" (真夏のクリスマスローズ) (dancer)
3. "Tsundere!"
  substitute for Tomomi Itano

Team Kenkyūsei "Theater no Megami"

1. "Candy" (キャンディー)

Team B 5th Stage "Theater no Megami"

1. "Romance Kakurenbo" (ロマンスかくれんぼ) (as part of zenza girls, i.e. the opening number performed by trainees)
2. "Candy"
  substitute for Amina Satō

Team A 6th Stage "Mokugekisha"

1. "Miniskirt no Yōsei" (ミニスカートの妖精) (zenza girls)
2. "Ude o Kunde" (腕を組んで)
  substitute for Sayaka Nakaya

Team K 6th Stage "Reset"

1. "Lemon no Toshigoro" (檸檬の年頃) (zenza girls)
2. "Gyakuten Ōjisama" (逆転王子様)
  substitute for Tomomi Nakatsuka

Team 4 1st Stage "Boku no Taiyō"

1. "Idol Nante Yobanaide" (アイドルなんて呼ばないで)

Team B Waiting Stage

1. "Kimi no C/W" (君のC/W)

Team A Renai Kinshi Jōrei

1. "Heart Gata Virus" (ハート型ウイルス)

Team A 7th Stage "M.T. ni Sasagu"

1. "Risuke" (リスケ)

== Bibliography ==
=== Magazines ===
- Myojo, Shueisha
- SEDA, Hinode Publishing

=== Photobooks ===
- Paruru, Komaru. (July 19, 2013, Shueisha) ISBN 9784087806885
- ParU (November 20, 2015, Shufu to Seikatsu Sha) ISBN 9784391147797
