= Mariko Shinoda =

Japanese actress and model (born 1986)

- 篠田 麻里子
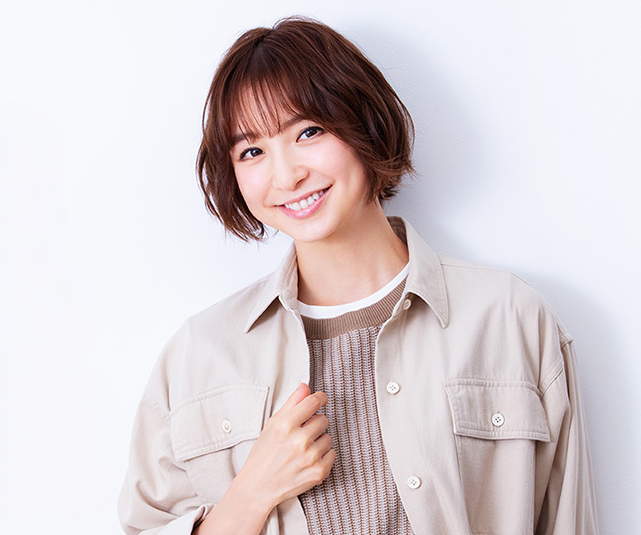
- Mariko Shinoda in 2021
- Born: 11 March 1986 (age 40); Itoshima, Fukuoka, Japan
- Other name: Mariko-sama (麻里子さま)
- Years active: 2006–present
- Spouses: Unknown (m. 2019; div. 2023); Koji Asano (m. 2026)
- Children: 1
- Musical career
- Genre: J-pop
- Occupations: Actress; model; singer (formerly)
- Label: King (AKB48)
- Past members: AKB48
- Website: mariko-shinoda.net

Mariko Shinoda (篠田 麻里子, Shinoda Mariko; born 11 March 1986 in Itoshima, Fukuoka) is a Japanese singer, actress, fashion model, and former member of the Japanese idol group AKB48, in which she was the captain of Team A.

== Career ==
In October 2005, she auditioned for AKB48's first generation roster but failed the audition. Shortly after her audition, Shinoda began working AKB48's theater café – then known as Akihabara 48 – as a café attendant serving customers and handing out promotional flyers on the street. Shinoda became quite popular among patrons who soon learned of her failing her audition. To show their support, patrons began submitting her name on hand-written ballots for the weekly performer polls. Yasushi Akimoto, general producer of AKB48, took notice of her popularity and gave her a chance to join AKB48 on the condition that she learn the group's 12 songs and dances in four days. She became AKB48's first non-generation, or "1.5 generation", member with her debut on Team A on 22 January 2006. Her first single as part of the main group was on "Aitakatta". On 30 March 2011, she began to host a show with her own name, Mariko-sama no Oriko-sama (麻里子さまのおりこうさま!) on NHK. She has appeared individually in television commercials and was cited as the "queen of TV commercials" (CM joō) for 2012 for having more contracts (a total of 20) with companies to appear in their ads than any other female tarento (fellow AKB48 member Tomomi Itano was tied at 20).

In August 2012, AKB48 Theater's manager Tomonobu Togasaki announced sweeping team changes that placed Shinoda as the new captain of Team A.

In 2013, Shinoda launched her clothing brand "ricori" which featured clothing that she had designed and produced. She stated that starting her own line of clothing had been a dream of hers before joining AKB48. In July 2014, ricori ceased operation and closed down its stores. Shinoda stated she was working as an adviser for the label only until 2013.

Shinoda placed fifth overall in the 2013 AKB48 General Election. On 8 June, during the broadcast of the election results, Shinoda announced that she would be leaving the group. Her graduation ceremony was held on 21 July at the Fukuoka PayPay Dome, and her final performance at the AKB48 theater was on 22 July.

On 24 January 2016, Shinoda appeared as the lead actress in Korean rapper Zico's 'It Was Love' music video. He sang the song with Luna, the main vocalist of South Korean girl group f(x).

== Personal life ==
On 20 February 2019, Shinoda announced her marriage on Instagram to a non-celebrity man working in the business industry. The couple was engaged after only a few months of dating and got married on 16 February 2019. On April 1, 2020, Shinoda's mother announced on her Instagram that Mariko gave birth to a daughter named Mei.

In December 2022, reports were circulating that Shinoda and her husband of three years were separated since August 2022 due to her alleged infidelity, and were fighting over parental rights of their daughter. Despite several audio recordings leaked onto the internet by a source, Shinoda later denied the allegations. On March 27, 2023, Shinoda announced that she and her husband had finalized their divorce amicably.

On March 29, 2026, Shinoda announced her second marriage to a businessman, Koji Asano, who is seven years her senior via her personal Instagram account.

== Discography ==
=== AKB48 main singles ===
Year	No.	Title	Role	Notes
2006	Ind-2	"Skirt, Hirari"	Supporting	The girls who did not sing on the main single participated as backup dancers. Debut with Team A.
2006	1	"Aitakatta"	A-side	
2007	2	"Seifuku ga Jama o Suru"	A-side	
2007	3	"Keibetsu Shiteita Aijō"	A-side	
2007	4	"Bingo!"	A-side	
2007	5	"Boku no Taiyō"	A-side	
2008	7	"Romance, Irane"	A-side	
2008	8	"Sakura no Hanabiratachi 2008"	A-side	
2008	9	"Baby! Baby! Baby!"	A-side	
2008	10	"Ōgoe Diamond"	A-side	
2009	11	"10nen Sakura"	A-side	
2009	12	"Namida Surprise!"	A-side	
2009	13	"Iiwake Maybe"	A-side	Ranked 3rd in 2009 General Election.
2009	14	"River"	A-side	
2010	15	"Sakura no Shiori"	A-side	Also sang on "Majisuka Rock 'n' Roll".
2010	16	"Ponytail to Shushu"	A-side	Also sang on "Majijo Teppen Blues".
2010	17	"Heavy Rotation"	A-side	Ranked 3rd in 2010 General Election. Also sang on "Yasai Sisters" and "Lucky Seven"
2010	18	"Beginner"	A-side	
2010	19	"Chance no Junban"	B-side	Did not place in rock-paper-scissors tournament. Sang on "Yoyakushita Christmas" and "Kurumi to Dialougue" (as Team A)
2011	20	"Sakura no Ki ni Narō"	A-side	
2011	21	"Everyday, Katyusha"	A-side	Also sang on "Korekara Wonderland" and "Yankee Soul".
2011	22	"Flying Get"	A-side	Ranked 4th in 2011 General Election. Also sang on "Seishun to Kizukanai Mama", "Ice no Kuchizuke", "Yasai Uranai"
2011	23	"Kaze wa Fuiteiru"	A-side	
2011	24	"Ue kara Mariko"	A-side, Center	Won 2011 rock-paper-scissors tournament. First AKB48 single to be titled after a member.
2012	25	"Give Me Five!"	A-side (Baby Blossom)	Played tambourine in Baby Blossom.
2012	26	"Manatsu no Sounds Good!"	A-side	Also sang on "Chōdai, Darling!"
2012	27	"Gingham Check"	A-side	Ranked 5th in 2012 General Election. Also sang on "Yume no Kawa".
2012	28	"Uza"	A-side	Also sang on "Kodoku na Hoshizora".
2012	29	"Eien Pressure"	A-side	Placed 5th in 2012 rock-paper-scissors tournament.
2013	30	"So Long!"	A-side	Also sang on "Ruby"
2013	31	"Sayonara Crawl"	A-side	Also sang on "Ikiru Koto"
2013	32	"Koi Suru Fortune Cookie"	A-side	Ranked 5th in 2013 General Election.
2016	43	"Kimi wa Melody"	A-side	Marked as the 10th Anniversary Single. Participated as graduated member.

=== Other AKB48 singles ===
- "Dareka no Tame ni – What can I do for someone?" (2011)
- "Sugar Rush" (2012)

=== Events ===
- Tokyo Girls Collection (2009–2010)
- Kobe Collection (2011)
- Girls Award (2012–2013)
- Kansai Collection (2013–2014)
- Tokyo Runway (2014)
- Fukuoka Asia Collection (2014)

== Stage units ==
A listing of Shinoda's participation in AKB48's theatre programs, called stages:

- 2005–2006: Team A 1st Stage: "Party ga Hajimaruyo" (PARTYが始まるよ)
  - small group songs: "Kiss wa Dameyo (2nd unit)
- 2006: Team A 2nd Stage: "Aitakatta" (会いたかった)
  - small group songs: "Namida no Shōnan", "Senaka Kara Dakishimete", "Rio no Kakumei"
- 2006–2007: Team A 3rd Stage: Dareka no Tame ni (誰かのために)
  - small group songs: "Bird" and "Seifuku ga Jama o Suru"
- 2007, 2008: (Note: Team A would return to performing the 4th Stage program from April–October 2008) Team A 4th Stage: Tadaima Renaichuu (ただいま 恋愛中)
  - small group songs: "Kikyō"
- 2007: Himawari-gumi 1st Stage: Boku no Taiyou (僕の太陽)
  - small group songs: "Himawari"
- 2007–2008: Himawari-gumi 2nd Stage: Yume o Shinaseru Wake ni Ikanai (夢を死なせるわけにいかない)
  - small group songs "Confession"
- 2008–2010: Team A 5th Stage: Renai Kinshi Jourei (恋愛禁止条例)
  - small group songs: "Manatsu no Christmas Rose"
- 2010–2012: Team A 6th Stage: Mokugekisha (目撃者)
  - small group songs "Saboten to Gold Rush"
- 2012–2013: Team A 1st Waiting Stage
  - Shonichi subgroup, small group songs "Kuroi Tenshi"

== Filmography ==
=== Films ===
Year	Title	Role	Reference
2011	Documentary of AKB48: To Be Continued	Self	
2011	All About My Dog (a.k.a. Inu to Anata no Monogatari: Inu no Eiga (犬とあなたの物語 いぬのえいが))	Sudo-san	
2011	Samurai Angel Wars	Nene	
2011	Salaryman NEO	Mao	
2012	Ouran High School Host Club (桜蘭高校ホスト部, Ōran Kōkō Hosuto Kurabu)	Michelle	
2015	Tag	Keiko	
2016	Terra Formars	Sorae Osako	
2016	Re:Born	Newt	
2017	Vigilante	Miki	
2018	Gangoose	Ageha	
2025	Blazing Fists	Haruka Yagura	

=== Dramas ===
Year	Title	Role	Reference
2009	Love Game episode 11	Ruka	
2009	Gine Sanfujinka no onna tachi (ja:ギネ 産婦人科の女たち, Gyne Ladies of ob-gyn)	Toda	
2010	Majisuka Gakuen	Sado	
2011	Taisetsu na koto wa subete kimi ga oshiete kureta (ja:大切なことはすべて君が教えてくれた, You taught me all important things)	Sayaka Tōdō	
2011	Fukuoka Renai Hakusho	Kumiko	
2011	Sakura kara no tegami (桜からの手紙 〜AKB48 それぞれの卒業物語〜)	Mariko Shinoda	
2011	Majisuka Gakuen 2	Sado	
2013	So long!	Kirie Hara	
2013	Wanda×AKB48 Short Story "Fortune Cookie"	Eriko Sudō	
2013	Umi no Ue no Shinryōjo episode 2	Kaoru Tachibana	
2014	Zenijo	Miho Shirai	
2014	Kazokugari	Mayumi Ishikura	
2015	NHK Special: Next World Watashitachi no Mirai	Android Mannequin	
2015	Itsutuboshi Tourist Saikō no Tabi, Goannai Shimasu!!	Misono Higure	
2016	Happy Marriage!?	Shitara Misaki	
2018	Magic x Warrior Magimajo Pures!	Tiara	
2019	Mistresses	Rei Sudō	

=== Television ===
Year	Title	Role
2007	Faitenshon Depāto (ja:ファイテンション☆デパート, Fight Tention Depart)	Self
2008	AKB 1:59 (ja:AKB1じ59ふん!, AKB 1ji 59fun)	Self
2008	AKB 0:59 (ja:AKB0じ59ふん!, AKB 0ji 59fun)	Self
2008	Gold House (ja:ゴールドハウス)	Self
2008–2011	AKBingo!	Self
2008–2009	AKB48 Nemousu TV (ja:AKB48ネ申テレビ)	Self
2008–2010	Jichael Mackson (ja:ジャイケルマクソン)	Self
2009–2010	Omoikkiri Pon! (ja:おもいッきりPON!)	Self
2009–2011	Shukan AKB48 (ja:週刊AKB, Weekly AKB)	Self
2009–2011	Nobunaga (ja:ノブナガ)	Self
2010	AKB600sec.	Self
2010–	Uma Pro (ja:うまプロ)	Self
2010–2013	AKB to ××! (ja:AKBと××!)	Self
2011	Documentary of AKB48	Self
2011	Mariko-sama no Orikousama!	Self
2021	Ani x Para World	Self

=== Dubbing ===
- In Time, Sylvia Weis (Amanda Seyfried)

== Bibliography ==
- Mariko no Orikousama! (Poplar Publishing, October 2011) ISBN 9784591126196
- Shinoda Mariko no 150-ji de Kotaenasai (Ascom, November 2011) ISBN 9784776207023

=== Magazines ===
- More, Shueisha 1977–, as an exclusive model since September 2008

=== Photobooks ===
- Pendulum (Wani Books, August 2008) ISBN 9784847041082
- Super Mariko (Wani Books, 27 May 2009) ISBN 9784847041792
- Mariko (Shueisha, 2 July 2010)
- MARIKO magazine (Shueisha, 28 October 2011) ISBN 9784081021307
- IQueen Vol.10 Shinoda Mariko (Plup Series, 27 July 2012) ISBN 4891949724
- Yes and No Mariko Shinoda (Shueisha, 28 November 2012) ISBN 9784087806618
