= Natsuki Uchiyama =

Japanese copywriter and former idol (born 1995)

- 内山 奈月
- Born: 25 September 1995 (age 30); Kanagawa Prefecture, Japan
- Education: Keio University
- Occupations: copywriter; tarento (former); Japanese idol (former)
- Employer: Hakuhodo
- Agents: AKS (2012–2016); Horipro (2017–2018)
- Musical career
- Genres: J-pop
- Years active: 2012–2016
- Formerly of: AKB48

Natsuki Uchiyama (内山 奈月, Uchiyama Natsuki; born 25 September 1995) is a Japanese copywriter and former idol. She is a former member of the Japanese idol girl group AKB48, where she was part of Team B.

== Biography ==
Uchiyama passed AKB48's 14th generation auditions on 13 May 2012 and debuted on 9 July. In August 2013, she was promoted to the newly formed Team 4. In February 2014, during the AKB48 Group Shuffle, it was announced that Uchiyama would be transferred to Team B. In April 2014, she enrolled in Keio University.

In the 2014 AKB48 Group general election, Uchiyama ranked for the first time at 63rd place.

Uchiyama's special skill as an idol was to recite articles of the Japanese Constitution. In July 2014, she collaborated with Shigeru Minamino, then an associate professor at Kyushu University School of Law, to write a book titled Constitutionalism: The Essence Unwritten in the Text (憲法主義: 条文には書かれていない本質, Kenpō shugi: jōbun ni wa kaka rete inai honshitsu) regarding the Japanese Constitution. They co-wrote the book with the hope that Japanese teenagers would get a basic grounding and become interested in constitutional discourse, since although the voting age in Japan has been lowered to 18 years old, education on the matter was considered lacking.

On 1 November 2015, Uchiyama announced her upcoming departure from AKB48. Her "graduation" performance took place on 31 January 2016 and she completed her final activity as a member on February 21.

As of October 2017, Uchiyama was signed to Horipro and was billed as a "Constitutional Idol" (憲法アイドル, Kenpō aidoru). From January to March 2018, she was a participant in Parliament Member GO (議員ＧＯ, Giin Go), a political variety show inspired by Pokémon Go, which was broadcast on the Internet television channel AbemaNews.

In March 2018, Uchiyama graduated from the Faculty of Economics of Keio University and left Horipro. She joined the Hakuhodo advertising agency the same year. In 2020, her team won the Grand Prix in the Brain Online Video Award competition.

== Discography ==
=== AKB48 singles ===
Year	No.	Title	Role	Notes
2012	28	"Uza"	B-side	Sang on "Otona e no Michi"
2012	29	"Eien Pressure"	B-side	Sang on "Watashitachi no Reason"
2013	30	"So Long!"	B-side	Sang on "Tsuyoi Hana"
2013	31	"Sayonara Crawl"	B-side	Sang on "Love Shugyou"
2013	33	"Heart Electric"	B-side	Sang on "Seijun Philosophy" as Team 4
2014	35	"Mae Shika Mukanee"	B-side	Sang on "Koi to Ka..."
2014	36	"Labrador Retriever"	B-side	Sang on "B Garden"
2014	37	"Kokoro no Placard"	B-side	Ranked 63rd in 2014 General Election. Sang on "Seikaku ga Warui Onna no Ko"
2014	38	"Kibouteki Refrain"	B-side	Sang on "Ambulance" and "Loneliness Club"
2015	39	"Green Flash"	B-side	Sang on "Yankee Rock" and "Hatsukoi no Oshibe"

== Appearances ==
=== Stage units ===
AKB48 Kenkyuusei Stage "Boku no Taiyou" (僕の太陽)

1. "Higurashi no Koi" (ヒグラシノコイ)

Team 4 2nd Stage "Te wo Tsunaginagara" (手をつなぎながら)

1. "Choco no Yukue" (チョコの行方)

AKB48 Team B 3rd Stage "Pajama Drive" (パジャマドライブ) (Revival)

1. "Tenshi no Shippo" (天使のしっぽ)

=== TV variety ===
- AKBingo!

=== TV dramas ===
- Majisuka Gakuen 4 (マジすか学園4) (2015), Kenpou (Team Hinabe)
- Majisuka Gakuen 5 (マジすか学園5) (2015), Kenpou (Team Hinabe)

== Bibliography ==
- "Constitutionalism: The Essence Unwritten in the Text" (憲法主義: 条文には書かれていない本質, Kenpō shugi: jōbun ni wa kaka rete inai honshitsu) (2014), ISBN 9784569764801, co-authored with Shigeru Minamino
