= Sayaka Nakaya =

- 仲谷 明香
- Born: October 15, 1991 (age 34); Iwate, Japan
- Occupations: Voice actress; singer
- Years active: 2007–present
- Agent: Amuleto
- Musical career
- Genres: J-pop; Anison
- Instruments: Vocals; clarinet

Sayaka Nakaya (仲谷 明香, Nakaya Sayaka; born October 15, 1991) is a Japanese voice actress and former member of the Japanese idol girl group AKB48. She is from Iwate. While with AKB48 she was a member of the subunit No Name. Her biggest role as a voice actress was as the title character Chitose Sakuraba in the anime series Chitose Get You!!.

== Career ==
Nakaya passed AKB48's generation 3 audition on December 3, 2006. She is one of 20 girls who passed from among 12.828 candidates. She was first on stage at AKB48 Theater as part of Team B on April 8, 2007. On August 23, 2009, a reshuffle was announced and Nakaya was transferred to Team A.

On December 2, 2010, an audio book of Moshidora read by her received "Audio Book Award 2010". The audio book gets awarded based on consumer votes in FeBe! audio book website. She also provided voice in the anime series of Moshidora.

Along with fellow member from Team K Miku Tanabe, Nakaya formed a unit called Baby Gamba. The unit released a single DVD "Ee Janaika" (ええじゃないか) under label Avex on September 14, 2011. Baby Gamba is a character in anime series Ganba no Bōken, a series based on kids book "Bōkentachi Gamba to 15-hiki no Nakama" by Otsuka Saito.

On December 13, 2011, her name was chosen along with 9 other members to voice characters in AKB48's original anime series AKB0048.

An autobiography of her, titled "Hisenbatsu Idol" was published in 2012. When she was a member, she was one of 4 AKB48's anime fan who is called "wota 4".

On Team K Waiting Stage on March 2, 2013, at night, Nakaya suddenly announces her departure as an AKB48 member to taking part in a voice acting audition. 4 days later at the same stage, she had her last and graduation concert as an AKB48 member. At the same time, she also quit from her former agency Mousa.

== Filmography ==
=== Anime ===
- Aikatsu Stars! as Haruka Ruka
- AKB0048 as Orine Aida
- AKB0048 Next Stage as Orine Aida
- Chaos;Child as Hana Kazuki
- Asako Get You!! as Chitose Sakuraba
- Chitose Get You!! as Chitose Sakuraba
- HappinessCharge PreCure! as Olina/Cure Wave
- Idol Incidents as Ume Momoi
- Kiznaiver as Ruru
- Magical Somera-chan as Somera Nonomoto
- Momokuri as Yuzuki Shimada
- Moshidora as Ayano Hōjō
- Tales of the Abyss as maid 1 (episode 1)
- The Idolm@ster as boy (episode 1)
- The Lost Village as girl (episode 6); Naana
- The Magnificent Kotobuki as Kate
- Triage X as Kaname Makishi

=== Video games ===
- Atelier Sophie as Tess Heitzmann
- Chaos;Child as Hana Kazuki
- Chōginga Sendan as Yuki Katsumura
- Himedatsu! Demon Saga as Charles
- Hyperdimension Neptunia Mk2 as Mina Nishizawa
- Idol Jihen as Shion Kagaya
- Moeru Mahjong Moejan! as Ayumu Honrō
- Thousand Memories as Hanabishi no An'yakusha Isabel
- Uchi no Himesama ga Ichiban Kawaii as Condemned Princess Gabriella

=== Narration ===
- Harapeko Yamagami-kun
- Zenryoku Ōen! NHK-hai Figure 2012 navigator

== Discography ==
=== Singles with AKB48 ===
| Year | No. | Title | Role | Notes |
|---|---|---|---|---|
| 2009 | 12 | "Namida Surprise" | B-side | Sang on "Shonichi" |
| 2009 | 14 | "River" | B-side | Sang on "Hikokigumo" with Theater Girls |
| 2010 | 16 | "Ponytail to Shushu" | B-side | Sang on "Boku no YELL" with Theater Girls |
| 2010 | 18 | "Beginner" | B-side | Sang on "Nakeru Basho" with DIVA |
| 2010 | 19 | "Chance no Junban" | B-side | Sang on "Kurumi to Dialogue" with Team A |
| 2011 | 20 | "Sakura no Ki ni Naro" | B-side | Sang on "Area K" with DIVA |
| 2011 | 21 | "Everyday, Katyusha" | B-side | Sang on "Hito no Chikara" with Under Girls |
| 2011 | 23 | "Kaze wa Fuiteiru" | B-side | Sang on "Vamos" with Under Girls Baragumi |
| 2011 | 24 | "Ue kara Mariko" | B-side | Sang on "Rinjin wa Kizutsukanai" with Team A |
| 2012 | 25 | "Give Me Five" | B-side | Sang on "Jung ya Freud no Baai" with Special Girls C |
| 2012 | 26 | "Manatsu no Sounds Good!" | B-side | Sang on "Mitsu no Namida" with Special Girls |
| 2012 | 27 | "Gingham Check" | B-side | Sang on "Do Re Mi Fa Onchi" with Next Girls |
| 2012 | 28 | "Uza" | B-side | Sang on "Scrap & Build" with Team K |
| 2012 | 29 | "Eien Pressure" | B-side | Sang on "Watashitachi no Reason" |
| 2012 | 30 | "So Long!" | B-side | Sang on "Yuuhi Marie" with Team K |

=== Collaborations and character songs ===
| Single | Information | Peak position |
|---|---|---|
| "Happiness Charge Precure! Wow!" (ハピネスチャージプリキュア!WOW!); Sayaka Nakaya and Hitomi Yoshida; HappinessCharge PreCure! opening song | Released: March 5, 2014; Label: Marvelous AQL; Catalog No.: MJSS-09114/5 | 13 |
| "Prism Max ~Heisei Ishin Full HD Remastered Edition~" (プリズムMAX 〜平成維新フルHDリマスター版〜); Sayaka Nakaya, Kaede Hondo, Rika Momokawa, & Maria Naganawa; Fushigi na Somera-chan opening song | Released: November 21, 2015; Label: Studio Chant; Catalog No.: STCH-0012 | |
