= Mariya Nagao =

Japanese television personality

Mariya Nagao 永尾 まりや
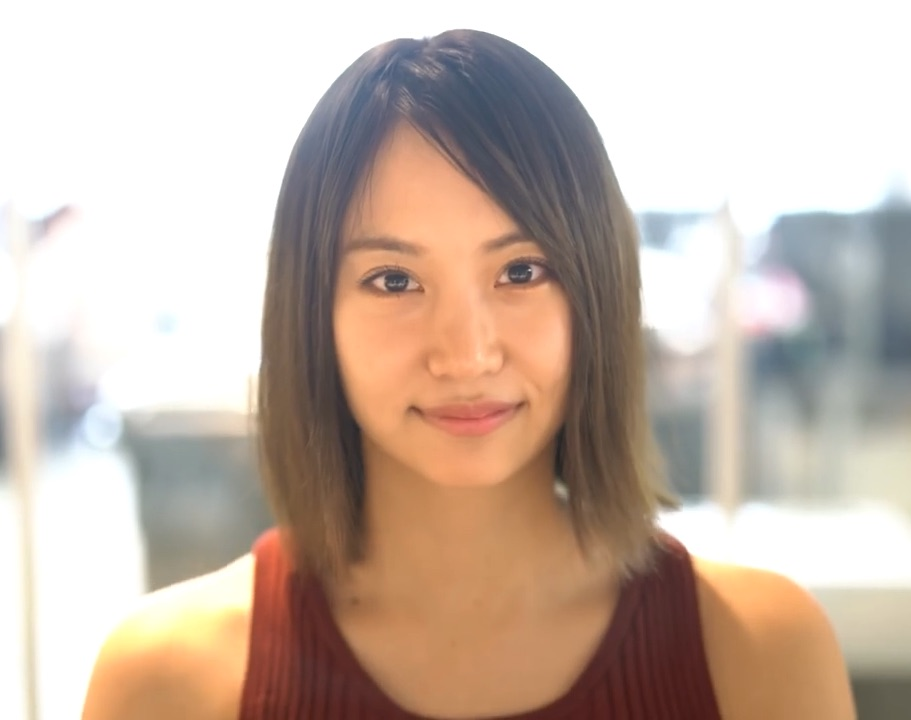
- Nagao in 2016

Background information
- Born: 10 March 1994 (age 32)
- Origin: Yokohama, Kanagawa Prefecture, Japan
- Genres: J-pop
- Occupation: Singer
- Years active: 2009–present

Mariya Nagao (永尾 まりや, Nagao Mariya; born March 10, 1994) is a Japanese television personality and former member of the Japanese idol girl group AKB48. Nagao is represented by Irving.

== Career ==
Mariya Nagao joined AKB48 as a 9th generation trainee in late 2009. On December 8, 2010, together with Mina Oba, Haruka Shimazaki, Haruka Shimada, Miyu Takeuchi, Mariko Nakamura, Anna Mori, and Suzuran Yamauchi, she was promoted to a full member, but stayed unassigned to any of the three teams until 2011 when Team 4 was formed. In the 2012 AKB48 elections (AKB48 27th Single Senbatsu Sōsenkyo) Mariya Nagao placed 39th.

On November 1, 2012, she was transferred to Team K. In 2013 she was assigned to be one of the members to sing the title track on the AKB48's 31st single "Sayonara Crawl". In the 2013 AKB48 elections (AKB48 32nd Single Senbatsu Sōsenkyo) Mariya Nagao placed 35th. In the 2014 AKB48 elections (AKB48 37th Single Senbatsu Sōsenkyo) she placed 65th. In the 2015 AKB48 elections (AKB48 41st Single Senbatsu Sōsenkyo) she placed 69th. On December 7, 2015 Mariya Nagao announced her graduation from AKB48. On March 10, 2016, shortly before officially leaving the group (the graduation ceremony was due March 19), Mariya Nagao released her first photobook, titled Utsukushii Saibō. With approximately 7,000 copies sold in the first week (according to Oricon), it debuted in the first place of the Oricon Photobook Chart. Her 3rd photobook titled "JOSHUA" release in August 2019.

== Appearances ==
=== TV dramas ===
- Majisuka Gakuen 2 (TV Tokyo, 2011) as Mariyagi
- Hanazakari no Kimitachi e (Fuji TV, 2011)
- Shiritsu Bakaleya Koukou (NTV, 2012) as Mana Honsō
- Majisuka Gakuen 3 (TV Tokyo, 2012) as Yagi
- Majisuka Gakuen 4 (NTV, 2015) as Gekkou
- JK wa Yukionna (MBS, 2015) as Kaori Yamashita
- Majisuka Gakuen 5 (NTV, 2015) as Gekkou
- Kazoku no Katachi (TBS, 2016) as Mariya Koyama
- Saki (MBS and TBS, 2016) as Touka Ryūmonbuchi
- Koe Girl! (TV Asahi, 2018) as Ineba Ren
- Investor Z (TV Tokyo, 2018) as Hiroko Machida
- Perfect Crime (TV Asahi, 2019)

=== Film ===
- Ghost Master (2019)

=== Events ===
- GirlsAward (2014 A/W, 2015 S/S)

=== Clothing ===
- Mariya Nagao x Kiks Tyo Kiks Girls Tees (2020)

== Bibliography ==
=== Photobooks ===
- Nagao Mariya First Photobook "Utsukushii Saibō" (永尾まりやファースト写真集 美しい細胞) (10 March 2016, Tokuma Shoten) ISBN 978-4198641214
- Mabui! Mariya (マブイ!まりや) (2017, Wani Books) ISBN 9784847049491
