= Ryoka Oshima =

Japanese singer

Ryoka Oshima 大島 涼花
- Born: 21 October 1998 (age 27)
- Origin: Kanagawa Prefecture, Japan
- Genres: J-pop
- Occupation: Actress
- Years active: 2011 – present
- Label: AKS
- Formerly of: AKB48

Ryoka Oshima (大島 涼花, Oshima Ryoka; born 21 October 1998 in Kanagawa Prefecture) is a Japanese actress and former singer. She is a former member of the Japanese idol girl group AKB48. She was a member of AKB48's Team B.

== Career ==
Oshima passed AKB48's 13th generation auditions on 9 September 2011. Her debut was on 8 December 2011 at AKB48's 6th anniversary stage performance. In August 2012, she was promoted to Team A. She started activities as a Team A member in November 2012. In February 2014, during the AKB48 Group Shuffle, it was announced Oshima would be transferred to Team B.

In the group's general elections in 2014, Oshima ranked for the first time at 80th position. Her first senbatsu single was Kibouteki Refrain, and she was the first 13th generation member to be selected for senbatsu.

On March 23, 2017 during AKB48 Team B's concert, it was announced that Ryoka would graduate from AKB48 soon. On 8 June 2017, Oshima graduated from AKB48.

== Discography ==
=== AKB48 singles ===
| Year | No. | Title | Role | Notes |
|---|---|---|---|---|
| 2012 | 27 | "Gingham Check" | Waiting Girls | Did not rank in 2012 General Election. Sang on "Ano Hi no Fuurin". |
| 2012 | 28 | "Uza" | Under Girls | Sang on "Tsugi no Season" and "Kodoku na Hoshizora" as Team A. |
| 2012 | 29 | "Eien Pressure" | B-side | Sang on "Watashitachi no Reason" |
| 2013 | 30 | "So Long!" | Under Girls | Sang on "Waiting Room" and "Ruby" as Team A. |
| 2013 | 31 | "Sayonara Crawl" | Under Girls | Sang on "Bara no Kajitsu" and "Ikiru Koto" |
| 2013 | 33 | "Heart Electric" | Team A | Sang on "Kiss Made Countdown" |
| 2014 | 35 | "Mae Shika Mukanee" | Baby Elephants | Sang on "Himitsu no Diary" |
| 2014 | 36 | "Labrador Retriever" | Team B | Sang on "B Garden" |
| 2014 | 37 | "Kokoro no Placard" | Upcoming Girls | Ranked 80th in 2014 General Election. Sang on "Chewing Gum no Aji ga Naku Naru Made" |
| 2014 | 38 | "Kibouteki Refrain" | A-side | First A-side. Also sang on "Loneliness Club" as Team B. |
| 2015 | 39 | "Green Flash" | B-side | Sang on "Yankee Rock" |
| 2015 | 40 | "Bokutachi wa Tatakawanai" | A-Side | Sang on "Bokutachi wa Tatakawanai" without participating in the music video. Also sang on "Summer Side" as Selection 16. |
| 2015 | 41 | "Halloween Night" | B-side | Did not rank in 2015 General Election. Sang on "Yankee Machine Gun" |
| 2015 | 42 | "Kuchibiru ni Be My Baby" | B-side | Sang on "Kimi wo Kimi wo Kimi wo..." as Jisedai Senbatsu, "Madonna no Sentaku" as Renacchi's Sousenkyo Senbatsu, and "Kin no Hane wo Motsu Hito yo" as Team B. |

== Appearances ==
=== Stage units ===
AKB48 Kenkyuusei Stage "RESET"

1. "Kokoro no Hashi no Sofa" (心の端のソフャー)

Team A Waiting Stage

1. "Skirt, Hirari" (スカート、ひらり)
2. "Tenshi no Shippo" (天使のしっぽ)
3. "Tsundere!" (ツンデレ!)

AKB48 Team B 3rd Stage "Pajama Drive" (パジャマドライブ) (Revival)

1. "Pajama Drive" (パジャマドライブ)

=== TV variety ===
- Ariyoshi AKB Kyowakoku (有吉AKB共和国) (2012–2016 )
- AKB Nemousu TV (AKBネ申テレビ) (2012–2016 )
- AKB48 no Anta Dare? (AKB48のあんた、誰?) (2012–2016 )
- AKBingo! (2013–2016 )

=== TV dramas ===
- Sailor Zombie (セーラーゾンビ) (2014)
- Majisuka Gakuen 4 (マジすか学園4) (2015), Kusogaki (Team Hinabe)
- Majisuka Gakuen 5 (マジすか学園5) (2015), Kusogaki (Team Hinabe)
- AKB Horror Night: Adrenline's Night (AKBホラーナイト アドレナリンの夜) Ep.12 – Grandma (2015), Moe
- Cabasuka Gakuen (キャバすか学園) (2016), Kusogaki (Ankou)
- Ultraman Taiga (ウルトラマンタイガ) Ep.11 & 12 (2019), Maria
- Informa (インフォーマ) (2023) Arimura

=== Musicals ===
- AKB49 Stage Play (2014)
