= Kazumi Urano =

Japanese singer

- 浦野 一美
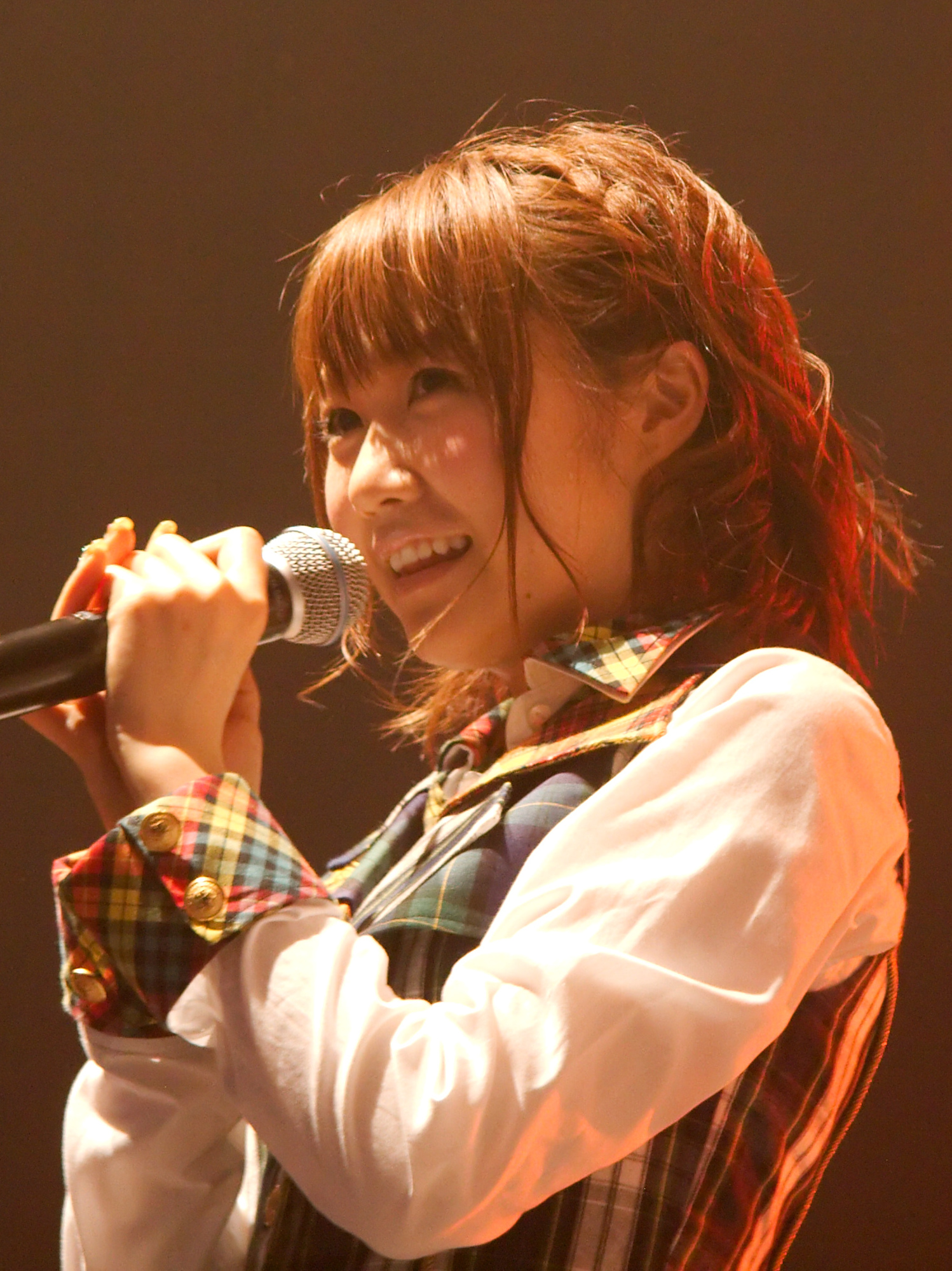
- Born: 23 October 1985 (age 39); Sakado, Saitama, Japan
- Other names: CinDy
- Occupations: Idol; actress
- Years active: 2005–
- Known for: Former SDN48 member (former AKB48 Team B and original Team A member); Former Watarirouka Hashiritai 7 provisional member; Former net idol
- Modeling information
- Height: 154 cm (5 ft 1 in)
- Agency: Production Ogi

Kazumi Urano (浦野 一美, Urano Kazumi, born 23 October 1985) is a Japanese singer and tarento. She is represented by Production Ogi and is a former provisional member of the female idol group Watarirouka Hashiritai 7, and former member of AKB48 and SDN48.

== Biography ==
- Urano was born on 23 October 1985 in Sakado, Saitama
- She passed the AKB48 Opening Member Audition on 30 October 2005 (Total number of entries: 7,924, final passed: 24).
- On 8 December 2005, she joined team A of AKB48.
- In February 2007, she transferred to the former team B as a support member. After the change, she later became captain of the former team B.
- On 11 October 2007, at the Team B 2nd Stage "Aitakatta" show she announced her transfer from AKS to Production Ogi.
- She was seventeenth in the AKB48 13th Single Senbatsu Sō Senkyo "Kamisama ni Chikatte Gachidesu competition which was carried out from June to July 2009.
- From 1 August 2009, together with Yukari Sato, Megumi Ohori, and Kayo Noro, she would also be active in SDN48.
- On the evening performance of the Yomiuri Shimbun's 135th Anniversary Concert AKB104 Selected Membership Cabinet Festival held on 23 August 2009, it was announced that she would be fully transferred to SDN48 from 2010 and would graduate from AKB48 at the same time. After that, she graduated from AKB48 on 16 April 2010.
- She appeared in AKB48 Request Hour Set List Best 100 for three consecutive years in 2008, 2009 and 2010 ("Sakura no Hanabiratachi", "Shonichi", and "Iiwake Maybe"). Urano is the only original member of all three songs.
- She appeared in the performance of SDN48 1st Stage "Yuuwaku no Garter" on 4 May 2011. Since the AKB48 era at the AKB48 Theater she had made 828 appearances during her enrolment in AKB48 and SDN48
- On 10 March 2012, Yasushi Akimoto announced a provisional membership of Watarirouka Hashiritai 7 on Google+. Urano is the first former member of AKB48 to join a derived unit of AKB48.
- Her first appearance as a member of the Watarirouka Hashiritai 7 was at the AKB48 concert Gyōmu Renraku. Tanomu zo, Katayama Buchō! in Saitama Super Arena on 23 March 2012.
- She graduated from SDN48 with the SDN48 Concert "Next Encore" in NHK Hall held at NHK Hall on 31 March 2012.
- From February 2014, the activities of SDN48 ended.

== Personal life ==
Under the influence of her uncle who is a pastry chef, Urano studied cooking and considered becoming a pâtissier if her music career ceased.

== Participating songs when enrolled with SDN48 and AKB48 ==
=== Single CD Selected Songs ===
With AKB48

- Sakura no Hanabiratachi
  - Dear my teacher – as Team A
- Included in "Skirt, Hirari"
  - Aozora no sobanīte – as Team A
- Included in "Aitakatta"
  - Dakedo... – as Team A
- Included in "Keibetsu Shiteita Aijō"
  - Namidauri no Shōjo
- Included in "Baby! Baby! Baby!"
  - Shonichi
- Included in "Ōgoe Diamond"
  - Ōgoe Diamond (team B ver.)
- Included in "Namida Surprise!"
  - Shonichi – as Team B
- Iiwake Maybe

With SDN48

- Gagaga
  - Kodokuna Runner
- Included in "Ai, Chuseyo"
  - Tengoku no Door wa 3-kai-me no Bell de Hiraku – as Under Girls A
- Included in "Min-Min-Min"
  - Onedari Shanpan – as Under Girls A
  - Everyday, Katyusha (SDN48 ver.)
- Kudokinagara Azabujūban duet with Monta Mino
- Makeoshimi Congratulation
  - Owaranai Encore

=== Album CD Selected Songs ===
With AKB48

- Included in Kamikyokutachi
  - Kimi to Niji to Taiyō to
- Included in Koko ni Ita Koto
  - Koko ni Ita Koto – as AKB48+SKE48+SDN48+NMB48

With SDN48

- Included in Next Encore
  - 1-Gallon no Ase

=== Other participating songs ===
- Single CD "Shōnen yo Uso o tsuke!" (with "Watarirouka Hashiritai 7")
- Shōnen yo Uso o tsuke!
- Kimi wa Kangaeru
- Shimai donburi – Mayu Watanabe-Kazumi Urano

=== Theatre performance unit songs ===
With AKB48

- Team A 1st Stage "Party ga Hajimaru yo" performance
  - Kiss wa dameyo (1st Unit)
  - Classmate (2nd Unit)
- Team A 2nd Stage "Aitakatta" performance
  - Koi no Plan
  - Rio no Kakumei
- Team A 3rd Stage "Dareka no tame ni" performance
  - Rider
- Team B 1st Stage "Seishun Girls" performance
  - Blue rose
  - Fushidarana Natsu
- Team B 2nd Stage "Aitakatta" performance
  - Namida no Shōnan
  - Rio no Kakumei
- Team B 3rd Stage "Pajama Drive" performance
  - Kagami no Naka no Jeanne d'Arc
- Team B 4th Stage "Idol no Yoake" performance
  - Tengoku Yarō

With SDN48

- SDN48 1st Stage "Yuuwaku no Garter" performance
  - Jajauma Lady

== Works ==
=== Videos ===
- Kazumi Urano/Cinderella Story (22 Aug 2014, E-Net Frontier)

== Appearances ==
=== TV dramas ===
- Gokusen Dai 3 Series Episode 3 (3 May 2008, NTV)
- Tokumei Kakarichō Hitoshi Tadano 4th Season Totsunyū SP (3 Jan 2009, EX) – as Marina Ueda.
- Tokumei Kakarichō Hitoshi Tadano 4th Season (8 Jan – 12 Mar 2009, EX) – as Marina Ueda.
- Drifting Net Cafe (10 Apr – 19 Jun 2009, MBS TV) – as Miku.
- Untouchable –Jiken Kisha Ryoko Narumi– (16 Oct – 18 Dec 2009, ABC-TV Asahi co-production) – as Rika Nishio.
- Majisuka Gakuen Final Episode (26 Mar 2010, TX) – as Umajisuka Jo Gakuen student.
- Keibuho Kenzo Yabe Episode 3 (23 Apr 2010, EX) – as herself.
- Honto ni atta Kowai Hanashi Natsu no Tokubetsu-hen 2010 AKB48 marugoto Jōrei Special "Raincoat no Onna" (24 Aug 2010, CX) – as herself.

=== Variety ===
- AKB1-ji 59-fun! (21 Feb – 27 Mar 2008, NTV)
- AKB0-ji 59-fun! (5–26 May 2008, NTV)
- AKB48 Nemōsu TV (13 Jul 2008 – occasionally, Family Gekijo)
- Suiensaa (8 Nov 2008, 7 Apr, 16 Jun 2009, 19 Jan 2010, NHK E)
- Omoikkiri Don! (25 Sep 2009, NTV) (Note: Appeared in the corner of "Kento Handa no Dodonpa Shōwa Meikyoku Tanbō" on behalf of Minami Takahashi (AKB48).)
- Suppon no Onna-tachi (16 Jun, 4, 11 Aug, 2 Sep 2010 –, EX)
- Pon! (2 Jul 2010 – occasionally, NTV) – On behalf of No3b's appearance in the corner of "Ikeba Daikichi! Shūmatsu 'Kamaru' Spot." (Note: Together with Kuro-chan (Yasuda Dai Circus) and Shinomiya Akatsuki (Ojinozborn) who co-starred on 2 July, 13 August 2010 and 7 January 2011.)
- AKB48 no anta, Dare? (10 Apr – 30 Oct 2013, NotTV) – Wednesday MC.

=== TV anime ===
- Crayon Shin-chan (16 Mar 2007, EX) (Note: Along with Mai Oshima, Yu Imai, Kayo Noro and Ayumi Orii, she sang the opening song "Yuru Yuru de De-O!" at the unit of Crayon Friends from AKB48.)

=== Films ===
- Crayon Shin-chan: The Storm Called: The Singing Buttocks Bomb (published 21 Apr 2007, Toho) – as Appeared in a film drama with the role of UNTI female member (newcomer).
- Gekijō-ban Trick Rei Nōryoku-sha Battle Royale (8 May 2010, Toho) – as herself. (Note: Appearance only for photos, but posted on the ending cast list.)

=== Video games ===
- Moeru Mājan Moejan! (2008, Hudson Soft, PSP software) – as Sakura Miyakoura, owner.

=== Radio ===
- AKB48 Ashita made mō chotto. (19 Nov 2007 – 26 Mar 2012, occasional appearances, NCB)
- Holiday Special bayfm meets AKB48 3rd Stage –Real– (15 Sep 2008, bayfm)
- DJ Tomoaki's Radio Show! (23 Oct 2008, Shimokita FM)
- Yamahan Presents Music Salad From U-kari Studio (25 Feb 2009, bayfm)
- CinDy Syndrome (2 Apr 2009 – 29 Mar 2012, bayfm)
- Listen –Live 4 Life– (5 Nov 2009, 25 Feb 2014, NCB)
- AKB48 no All Night Nippon SDN48 Special (18 Jun 2010, NBS)
- SDN48 no All Night Nippon R Radio Charity Musicthon Special (24 Dec 2010, NBS)
- –Idol Showcase– i-Ban! (18 Dec 2011, Nack5)
- Watarirouka Hashiritai 7 (25 Mar 2012 –, occasional appearances, NBS)
- The Nutty Radio Show Onitamashī (7 Jan 2015, Nack5) – As a surrogate personality.
- Sogo Chiba Shop Aurora Mall Junnu presents Junnu Cafe (28 Apr 2013, bayfm) – Yukari Sato's surrogate personality.
- Mozaiku Night (2 Apr 2014 – 30 Mar 2016, bayfm) – Wednesday DJ.

=== Internet TV ===
- Daimaou Kosaka no Katsuage! (Apr 2012, Ameba Studio) – 6th apprentice. (Note: Monthly regular for April 2012.)

=== Music videos ===
- Aqua Timez "Plumeria (Hana Uta)" (2009)

=== Stage ===
- Nakano Blondies (20–25 Dec 2008, New National Theatre Tokyo – as Otoki.
- Gekidan Taishū Shōsetsuka Kimazuge –Ainokotoba– (29 Apr – 5 May 2010, Tokyo Metropolitan Theatre) – as Teruno Asahina.
- Breakthrough Japan 2010 Himi. (14 Aug 2010, Shinjuku Space 107) – as Kami-sama.
- Atelier Dancan Produce Music Play Act Kyōka Izumi (1–24 Oct 2010, Panasonic Globe Theatre-Sendai Power Hall-Nagasaki Civic Auditorium-Kyoto Arts Theater Spring and Autumn-Hokuriku Newspaper Akabane Hall) – as Kamehime, etc.
- Dump Show! (16–31 Jul 2011: Sunshine Theatre, 10–14 Aug: Sankei Hall Breezé) – as Hikaru.
- Nakano Blondies (6–10 Oct 2011: Sunshine Theatre, 19–27: Shin Kobe Oriental Theater) – as Yuzuka.
- Go, Jet! Go! Go! –I Love You ga Ienakute– (24–28 Oct 2012, Shinjuku Space 107)
- Prince of the Sleepless Town (29 Nov – 2 Dec 2012, Total Clearance Hall Space Zero)
- –Mihama Seishi Graffiti– Chiba Soul (15, 16 Mar 2013, Mihama Cultural Hall Main Hall, Chiba City)
- Go, Jet! Go! Go! –I Love You ga Ienakute– Saien (8–12 May 2013, Shinjuku Space 107)
- Cornflakes 10th memorial performance Hakase to Tarō no Ijōna Aijō (24–30 Jul 2013, Haiyuza Theater)
- 10th Tokyo Performers Club Produce Performance Asakusa acharaka (7 Nov – 1 Dec 2013, Haiyuza Theater)
- Chiba Soul II (8 Mar 2014, Mihama Cultural Hall Main Hall, Chiba City)
- Chiba Soul III (14, 15 (planned) Mar 2015, Mihama Cultural Hall Main Hall, Chiba City)
- Share House -O-Mo-Te-Na-Shi- Bangai-hen –CinDy no Orushuban– (29 Oct – 3 Nov 2015, Aqua Studio)

=== Events ===
- P Ark presents Makuhari Messe Dokidoki Flea Market 2009 (3 May 2009, Makuhari Messe, International Exhibition Hall 1 bayfm Special Stage)
- Kazumi Urano (CinDy) (Note: Notation in () is the event name notation in AKB48 Cafe&Shop Akihabara.) no Tsumaranai Hanashi o Kikinagara Oishiku Sweets o Taberu-kai (6 Feb 2012, AKB48 Cafe&Shop Akihabara)
- Kazumi Urano (CinDy) no Sōtō Tsumaranai Hanashi o Kikinagara Oishiku Sweets o Taberu-kai (13 Feb 2012, AKB48 Cafe&Shop Akihabara)

== Bibliography ==
=== Calendars ===
- Kazumi Urano 2011-nen Calendar (30 Sep 2010, Hagoromo)
- Kazumi Urano 2014-nen Calendar (23 Oct 2013, Triax)
- Kazumi Urano 2015-nen Calendar (4 Oct 2014, Triax)
