= Haruka Katayama =

Japanese musical artist

Haruka Katayama 片山 陽加
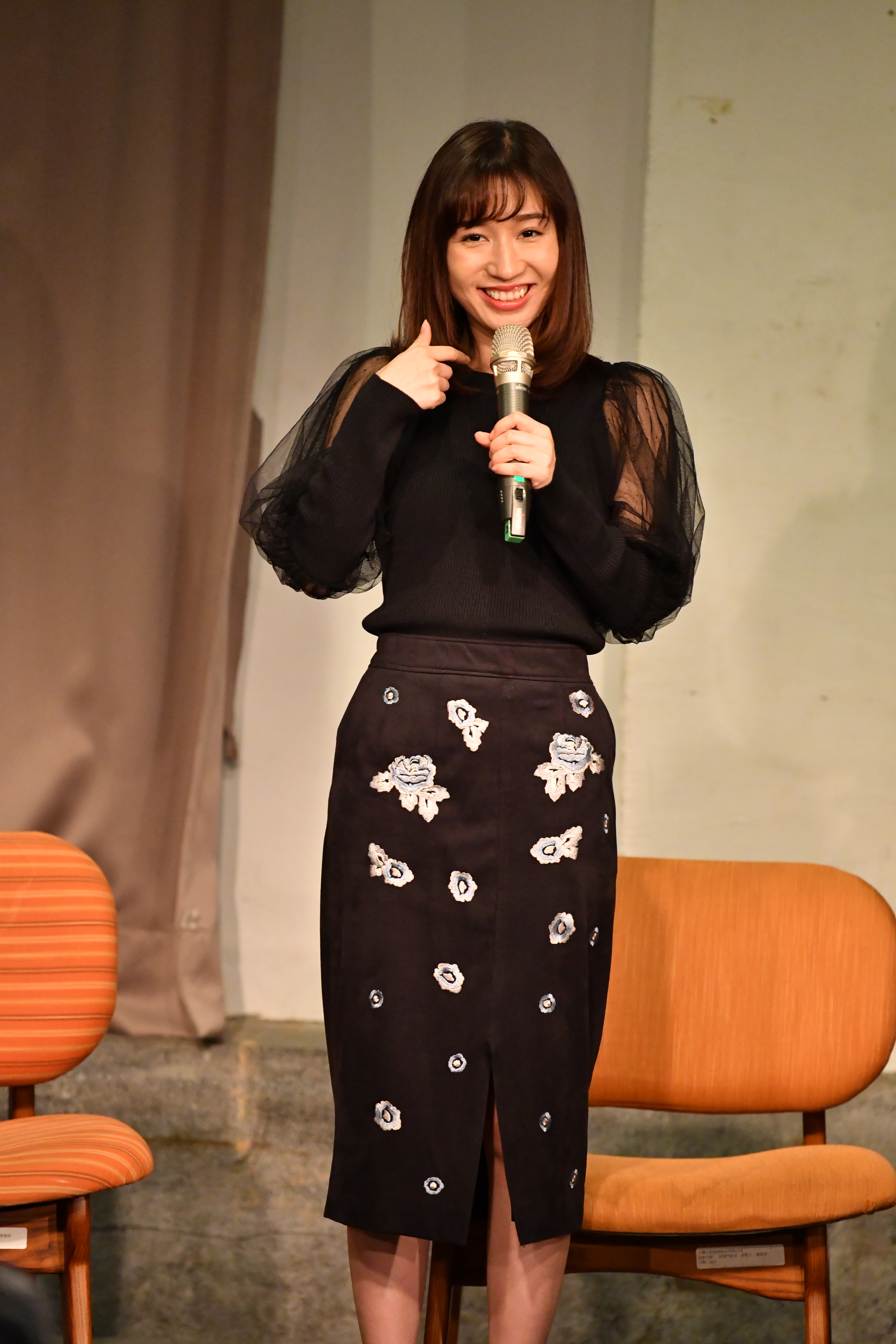

Background information
- Also known as: Hāchan (はーちゃん); Kataharu (かたはる); Shōwa (昭和)
- Born: 10 May 1990 (age 36); Aichi Prefecture, Japan
- Genres: J-pop
- Occupations: Actress; tarento
- Years active: 2007–present
- Label: DefStar Records
- Formerly of: B; A

Haruka Katayama (片山 陽加, Katayama Haruka; born 10 May 1990), is a Japanese actress and tarento who is a former member of the idol group AKB48's team A produced by Yasushi Akimoto. She debuted in 2007 with team B, joined team A in 2010, and returned to team B in 2012.

Katayama is represented with Irving.

== AKB48 appearances ==
=== Singles ===
Single	Song	Part of
"Ōgoe Diamond"	"Ōgoe Diamond (Team B ver.)"	Team B
"Namida Surprise!"	"Shonichi"	Team B
"Iiwake Maybe"	"Tobenai Agehachō"	Under Girls
"River"	"Kimi no koto ga sukidakara"	Under Girls
"Ponytail to Shushu"	"Nusuma reta Kuchibiru"	Under Girls
"Heavy Rotation"	"Namida no Seesaw Game"	Under Girls
"Beginner"	"Boku dake no value"	Under Girls
"Beginner"	"Kimi ni tsuite"	Mint
"Chance no Junban"	"Kurumi to Dialogue"	Team A
"Sakura no Ki ni Narō"	"Kiss made 100 Mile"	Mint
"Everyday, Katyusha"	"Hito no Chikara"	Under Girls
"Kaze wa Fuiteiru"	"Gondola Lift"	Under Girls Yuri-gumi
"Ue kara Mariko"	"Rinjin wa Kizutsukanai"	Team A
"Give Me Five!"	"Hitsujikai no Tabi"	Special Girls B
"Manatsu no Sounds Good!"	"Guguta su no Sora"	
"Gingham Check"	"Do Re Mi Fa Onchi"	Next Girls
"Uza"	"Seigi no Mikata janai Hero"	Team B
"Eien Pressure"	"Watashitachi no Reason"	
"So Long!"	"Sokode Inu no unchi Fun jau ka ne?"	Umeda Team B
"Sayonara Crawl"	"Romance Kenjū"	Team B
"Koi Suru Fortune Cookie"	"Kondokoso Ecstacy"	Next Girls
"Heart Electric"	"Tiny T-shirt"	Team B
"Mae shika Mukanee"	"Koi toka..."	
"Labrador Retriever"	"Kimi wa Kimagure"	Team A

=== Stage units ===
Title	Song	Notes
Team B 1st Stage: Seishun Girls	"Ame no Doubutsuen"	
Team B 2nd Stage: Aitakatta	"Namida no Shonan"	
Team B 2nd Stage: Aitakatta	"Koi no Plan"	
Team B 2nd Stage: Aitakatta	"Rio no Kakumei"	Although it is a participation song for all members, she appeared front member (Ski-Hira Seven) of "Skirt, Hirari"
Team B 3rd Stage: Pajama Drive	"Junjou Shugi"	
Team B 4th Stage: Idol no Yoake	"Itoshiki Natasha"	
Team B 4th Stage: Idol no Yoake	"Kataomoi no Taikakusen"	Moeno Nito's understudy song
Team K 5th Stage: Gyaku agari	"Wagamamana Nagareboshi"	Erena Ono's understudy
Team K 5th Stage: Gyaku agari	"Dakishime raretara"	Reina Fujie's understudy song
Theatre G-Rosso: Yume o Shina seru wake ni ikanai	"Hajimete no Jellybeans"	Natsuki Sato and Sumire Satō's understudy
Team A 6th Stage: Mokugeki-sha	"Saboten to Gold Rush"	
Team A 6th Stage: Mokugeki-sha	"Aishi-sa no Axel"	Minami Takahashi's understudy song
Team S 3rd Stage: Seifuku no Me	"Omoide Ijō"	
Team A 7th Stage: Renai Kinshi Jōrei	"Renai Kinshi Jōrei"	Karen Iwata's understudy
Team A 7th Stage: Renai Kinshi Jōrei	"Tsundere!"	Chiyori Nakanishi and Minami Takahashi's understudy

== Publications ==
=== Videos ===
Year	Title
2012	Chikyū Bōei Girls P9
2012	Junjō-dōri 3-chōme 2525-banchi
2016	Aru Hi

== Filmography ==
=== TV dramas ===
Year	Title	Role	Network	Notes
2010	Majisuka Gakuen	Showa	TV Tokyo	
2011	Sakura kara no Tegami: AKB48 sorezore no Sotsugyō Monogatari		NTV	
2013	So long!	Kanako Eguchi	NTV	Episode 3

=== Variety ===
Year	Title	Network	Notes
2009	AKBingo!	NTV	Irregular appearances
2009	AKB48 Neshin TV	Family Gekijo	
2009	Shūkan AKB	TV Tokyo	
2010	Nekketsu Bo-So TV	CTC	Irregular appearances
2010	Naruhodo! High School	NTV	Irregular appearances
2010	Ariyoshi AKB Kyōwakoku	TBS	Irregular appearances
2010	AKB to ××	YTV	
2011	AKB48 Conte: Bimyō	Hiakri TV	
2012	AKB48 no anta, Dare?	NotTV	
2012	Jinmyaku-tsukuri Variety Haruka Katayama no Sugo to mo'!	Pigoo HD	First crown programme
2012	Bimyō: na Tobira AKB48 no Gachichare	Hikari TV Channel	
2013	AKB48 Conte: Nani mo soko made...	Hikari TV Channel	
2014	Maasa no Heya ni yōkoso!	NotTV	
2016	Keibayoso Variety: Umanori	NotTV	

=== Other TV programmes ===
Year	Title	Network	Notes
2010	Suiensaa	NHK-E	
2011	Girls News: Girls Pop	Pigoo HD, Enta! 371	First MC
2013	AKB48 no Yūyū Taipei	BS NTV	
2016	Utae! Shōwa no Best Ten	BS NTV	

=== Films ===
Year	Title	Role
2011	Chikyū Bōei Girls P9	Mahachi Tsuchiura

=== Anime television ===
Year	Title	Role	Network
2008	Tales of the Abyss	Maid	MBS

=== Stage ===
Year	Title	Role	Notes
2009	Infinity	Underclass person	
2010	Act Kyoka Izumi		
2011	Blues in the Night	Girl	
2012	Show Girl no Jikan Ryokō		
2013	Shinkansen osōji no Tenshi-tachi	Nanako Fujita	
2013	Sempo	Setsuko Sugihara	Dual cast with Ami Sato
2014	Island: Katsute kono Shima de	Te Morne	
2014	Anata ni Okuru Kiss 2	Kotone Harusawa	
2014	Ribbon no Kishi: Washio Kōkō Engeki-bu Funtō-ki	Mayumi Ikeda	Lead role
2014	Fantasy Planet	Alice	Lead role
2014	Kurukuru to Shi to Shitto	Tamaru-kun's lover	Guest
2015	Live Airline	Sakura Yoshimura	
2015	Gendai-ban Wakakusa Monogatari: Little Woman	Haru	Lead role
2015	Gekirin Android	Ringo	
2015	Mother: Tokkō no Haha Torihama Tome Monogatari	Reiko Torihama	
2016	Atai Senkin no Cabaret	Melt	Lead role
2016	Yuki no Princess		
2016	Oyado kawasemi		
2016	Peter Pan	Wendy	Double cast with Mari Iriki
2016	Ōkina Niji no ato de: Fudō 4 Kyōdai		

=== Advertisements ===
Year	Title
2016	Auto Bell

=== Radio ===
Year	Title	Network	Notes
2008	AKB48 Ashita made mō chotto.	NCB	Irregular
2010	AKB48 Konya wa Kaeranai...	CBC Radio	
2010	AKB48 no All Night Nippon	NBS	Irregular
2011	AV Music Channel	Air-G'	"Hāchan Tsūshin"
2012	Listen? Live 4 Life	NCB	
2014	Wataru Takeuchi to Haruka Katayama no myūjikku horikku	Radio Nippon	

=== Video games ===
Year	Title	Role
2008	Moeru Mājan: Moejan!	Kyoko Suzuri

=== Internet ===
Year	Title	Network	Notes
2011	unjō-dōri 3-chōme 2525-banchi	Niconico Banboo chan'neru	
2014	Gyōmu Renraku. Tanomu zo, Katayama-sachō!	Ameba Studio	
2014	Daimaou Kosaka no Katsuage!	Ameba Studio	Apprentice MC
	Katayama dotto Komu	showroom	
2016	Sashimeshi		
2016	Hideki Nishiura no Mezase Kōhaku! Nico-sei Special Session	Niconico Live	
2016	Umanushinarita Girl!	Wallop	

=== Events ===
Year	Title	Notes
2012	Gyōmu Renraku. Atsumare, Katayama Family! In AKB48 Cafe	
2014	Treasure of my life: Korekara mo Konosaki mo	
2014	Haruka Katayama Sotsugyō-jun Kaien Shōai in Taiwan	
2015	Haruka Katayama: Seitan Live & fan meeting	
2015	AJ Girls Music Festival	
2015	Asakusa Yume Dōchū Kayō Show	
2015	Share House –O-Mo-Te-Na-Shi– Bangai-hen –CinDy no Orushuban–	
2015	Umajo ttenani!? Arima Kinen no Miryoku: Tettei Bunseki!	
2015	thank	
2016	Bashi's bar Vol. 29	Guest

== Bibliography ==
=== Calendars ===
Year	Title
2011	Haruka Katayama 2012-nen Calendar
2012	Takujō Haruka Katayama 2013-nen Calendar
2013	Takujō Haruka Katayama 2014-nen Calendar
