= Natsumi Hirajima =

Japanese tarento and actress (born 1992)

- 平嶋 夏海
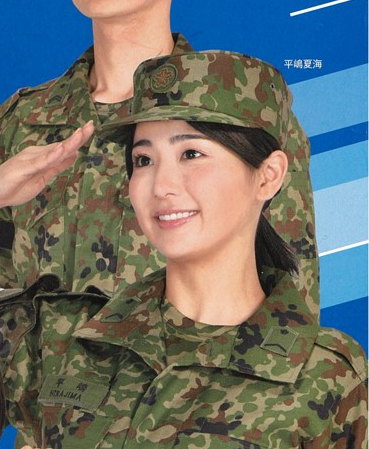
- Hirajima in August 2021
- Born: 28 May 1992 (age 34); Tokyo, Japan
- Other name: Natchan (なっちゃん)
- Occupations: Singer; actress; tarento
- Years active: 2005–present
- Agents: One Eight Promotion (2015–); Production Ogi (2008–15)
- Height: 154 cm (5 ft 1 in) (2015)
- Spouse: Unknown (m. 2026)

Natsumi Hirajima (平嶋 夏海, Hirajima Natsumi; born 28 May 1992), is a Japanese tarento and actress. She is a former first generation member of the idol girl group AKB48. She was born in Tokyo. She is represented by One Eight Promotion.

== Personal life ==
On July 23, 2026, Hirajima announced via an open letter posted on her official social media account that she had registered her marriage to her non-celebrity partner.

== Participating songs with AKB48 ==
=== Single CD selection music ===
Single	Song	As
Sakura no Hanabiratachi	Dear my teacher	Team A
Skirt, Hirari	Aozora no sobanīte	Team A
"Aitakatta"	Dakedo...	Team A
"Keibetsu Shiteita Aijō"	Namidauri no Shōjo	
Bingo!		
Sakura no Hanabiratachi	Saigo no Seifuku	
"Baby! Baby! Baby!"	Shonichi	
"Ōgoe Diamond"	Ōgoe Diamond (team B ver.)	Team B
"Namida Surprise!"	Shonichi	Team B
"Iiwake Maybe"	Tobenai Agehachō	Under Girls
"River"	Hikōkigumo	Theater Girls
"Ponytail to Shushu"	Boku no Yell	Theater Girls
"Heavy Rotation"	Namida no Seesaw Game	Under Girls
"Beginner"	Boku dake no value	Under Girls
"Chance no Junban"	Love Jump	Team B
"Sakura no Ki ni Narō"	Area K	Diva
"Everyday, Katyusha"	Hito no Chikara	Under Girls
"Flying Get"	Dakishimecha ikenai	Under Girls
"Kaze wa Fuiteiru"	Vamos	Under Girls Haragumi
"Ue kara Mariko"	Yobisute Fantasy	Team B
"Give Me Five!"	Jung ya Freud no baai	Special Girls C
"Koi Suru Fortune Cookie"	Suitei Marmalade	Future Girls

=== Theatre unit songs ===
Title	Songs	Notes
Team A 1st Stage Party ga Hajimaru yo	Hoshi no Ondo (2nd Unit)	
Team A 2nd Stage Aitakatta	Nagisa no Cherry	
Team A 2nd Stage Aitakatta	Rio no Kakumei	
Team A 3rd Stage Dareka no tame ni	Nage Kiss de Uchi Otose!	
Team B 1st Stage Seishun Girls	Ame no Dōbutsuen	
Team B 1st Stage Seishun Girls	Fushidarana Natsu	
Team B 2nd Stage Aitakatta	Glass no I Love You	
Team B 2nd Stage Aitakatta	Senaka kara Dakishimete	
Team B 2nd Stage Aitakatta	Rio no Kakumei	Although it is an all-participation song, she appears in the front member (SkaHira Seven) at "Skirt, Hirari"
Team B 3rd Stage Pajama Drive	Pajama Drive	
Team B 4th Stage Idol no Yoake	Kuchiutsushi no Chocolate	
Theatre G-Rosso Yume o Shina seru wake ni ikanai	Bye Bye Bye	Minami Minegishi and Haruka Ishida's standby
Team B 5th Stage Theater no Megami	Locker Room Boy	
Team B 5th Stage Theater no Megami	Arashi no Yoru ni wa	Mariya Suzuki's unit understudy

== Works ==
=== Videos ===
Date	Title	Publisher
17 Jul 2014	Natsumi	E-Net Frontier
23 Jan 2015	Hajimete no Natsu	Takeshobo
23 Oct 2015	Natsu Shōjo	E-Net Frontier
20 Mar 2016	Amanatsu	Idol One
5 Aug 2016	Momonatsu	E-Net Frontier
17 Feb 2017	Natsuhisoka	E-Net Frontier
25 Aug 2017	Natsuhada	Takeshobo

== Filmography ==
=== Films ===
Date	Title	Role	Distributor	Notes	Ref.
28 Apr 2007	Ashita no Watashi no tsukurikata	Hinako's classmate	Nikkatsu		
Apr 2012	×Game 2	Yuko Hagiwara	Jolly Roger		
1 Feb 2013	Documentary of AKB48 No flower without rain Shōjo-tachi wa Namida no Nochi ni Nani o Miru?		Toho		
9 Nov 2013	Undressed Minako	Noelle	Chance In		
28 May 2016	Onna Hierarchy Teihen Shōjo	Momoko Kube	Canter	Lead role	
24 Sep 2016	Make Room 2	Shunkashūtō Mariko	Canter		

=== Television ===
Date	Title	Network	Notes	Ref.
21 Feb – 6 Mar 2008	AKB 1ji 59 fun!	NTV		
12 Oct 2008	AKB48 Neshin TV Season 1	Family Gekijo		
3–17 Mar 2010	AKBingo!	NTV		
19 Mar – 2 Apr 2010	Shūkan AKB	TX		
1, 8 Aug 2010	AKB48 Neshin TV Season 4	Family Gekijo		
30 Aug, 21 Oct 2010	Ariyoshi AKB Republic	TBS		
1 Jul 2011	Majisuka Gakuen 2	TX	Final Episode; as Natsumi	
20 Oct – 3, 17 Nov, 1–15 Dec 2011	AKB48 Conte: Bimyo	Hikari TV Channel		
13, 20 Nov 2011	AKB48 Neshin TV Season 8	Family Gekijo		
2 Jun 2013	AKB48 no Shinjitsu: Senbatsu Sō Senkyo Chokuzen SP	CX		
14 Dec 2013	AKB48 Show!	NHK BS1		
1 Jan 2014	CDTV Special! Toshikoshi Premier Live	TBS		
23 Jan 2014	Music Japan	NHK G	"Dissolving Across the Street Corner Running Corps Soon"	
10 Mar 2015	Ōen-bi Joshi!	CTC		
16 Aug 2015	Idream!	Kawaiian TV		
9 Dec 2015, 24 Mar 2016	Onegai! Ranking	EX		
16 Jan 2016	Doyō Special: Fuyu no Tōhoku: Yukimi & Konyoku meguri Tabi	TX		
13 Mar 2016	Beach Angels: Natsumi Hirajima in Guam	TBS Channel 1		
22 Jul 2016	Yurui	MXTV	Episode 3	
Sep, Nov–Dec 2016, Jan–Aug 2017	Shūkan Bike TV	CTC	Assistant	
2 Feb 2017	Atsushi Tamura no Chijōhade wa Dame! Zettai!	BS SukaPā!		
27 Feb 2017	Yoroi Bijo	Fuji TV One		
26 Mar 2017	Rank Ōkoku	TBS		
15 Apr 2017	Goddotan	TX		
28 Apr 2017	London Hearts	EX		

=== Concerts ===
Dates	Title	Location
8 Jun 2013	AKB48 Super Festival –Nissan Stadium Chitche'! Chitcha kunaishi!	Nissan Stadium
7–8 Aug 2013	AKB48 2013 Manatsu no Dome Tour –Madamada, yaranakya ikenai koto ga aru–	Kyocera Dome Osaka
16–17 Aug 2013	AKB48 2013 Manatsu no Dome Tour –Madamada, yaranakya ikenai koto ga aru–	Nagoya Dome
22–25 Aug 2013	AKB48 2013 Manatsu no Dome Tour –Madamada, yaranakya ikenai koto ga aru–	Tokyo Dome
20 Dec 2013	"Stray Dog" X'mas Live!	Hatsudai Doors
27 Jan 2014	AKB48 Unit Matsuri	Tokyo Dome City Hall
9 Feb 2014	Watarirouka Hashiri-tai Kaisan Concert	Zepp DiverCity
8 Jan 2016	"Stray Dog" Shinnenkai Live! 2016	Hatsudai Doors
27 Mar 2016	AKB48 Group Minami Takahashi Sotsugyō Concert	Yokohama Stadium
22 Feb 2017	Kojimatsuri –Haruna Kojima Kansha-sai–	National Yoyogi Stadium First Gymnasium

=== Stage ===
Dates	Title	Role	Locations	Notes
27 Feb – 1 Mar 2009	Arts Fusion 2008 in Kanagawa Drill Tamashī: Yokohama Genba-hen		Kanagawa Prefectural Youth Center Hall	
30, 31 Oct 2009	Ran-Doh		The Galaxy Theatre	
3–5 Jan 2010	Ran-Doh –Voice in City– Saien		Aoyama Theatre	
26– Feb 2010	Arts Fusion 2008 in Kanagawa Drill Tamashī: Yokohama Gachinko-hen		Kanagawa Prefectural Youth Center Hall	
6–14 Aug, 3, 4 Sep 2011	2011 Tōhoku earthquake and tsunami charity performance Pochitto na. -Switching On Summer-		Sotetsu Honda Gekijo, Gunma Prefectural Civic Center	
24–28 Oct 2012	Go, Jet! Go! Go! –I Love You ga Ienakute–		Space107	
15, 16 Mar 2013	–Mihama Seishun Graffiti– Chiba Soul		Chiba City Mihama Cultural Hall Main Hall	
25–29 Apr 2013	Asakusa acharaka		Haiyuza Theater	
8–13 May 2013	Go, Jet! Go! Go! –I Love You ga Ienakute– Saien		Space107	
Jul–Aug 2013	My House		Hep Hall, Space107, Theater Green	
Jul–Aug 2013	Onna no Ko Monogatari	Nori Takahara	Space107, Theater Green	Lead role
7–8 Mar 2014	Chiba Soul II		Chiba City Mihama Cultural Hall Main Hall	
12–13 Apr 2014	Haha no Sakura ga Chitta Yoru		Hep Hall	
16–20 Apr 2014	Haha no Sakura ga Chitta Yoru		Theatre Sunmall	
16–20 Apr 2014	Keibō no Araiguma		Theatre Sunmall	
5–6 May 2014	"StrayDog" Produce Onna no Ko Monogatari	Nori Takahara	Theater Green	Lead role
17–18 May 2014	"StrayDog" Produce Onna no Ko Monogatari	Nori Takahara	ABC Hall	Lead role
4–9 Jun 2014	Cornflakes Dai 11-kai Kōen Goodbye Shakespeare!!		Nakameguro Kinko Theater	
2–3 Aug 2014	"StrayDog" Produce 2014-Nen Natsuyasumi Tokubetsu Kikaku Mondai no nai Watashi-tachi	Yayoi Ichinose	Hep Hall	Lead role
8–10 Aug 2014	"StrayDog" Produce 2014-Nen Natsuyasumi Tokubetsu Kikaku Mondai no nai Watashi-tachi	Yayoi Ichinose	Auru Supotto	Lead role
3–14 Sep 2014	Kiss Me You –Ganbatta Simp―Tachi e–		Nakameguro Kinko Theater	
22–25 Nov 2014	Share House O-Mo-Te-Na-Shi		Aqua studio	
17–22 Feb 2015	Share House II O-Mo-Te-Na-Shi		Aqua studio	
17–22 Feb 2015	Chiba Soul III		Chiba City Mihama Cultural Hall Main Hall	
15–19 Apr 2015	Satsujinki Fujiko no Shōdō		Space Zero	
4–6 May 2015	"StrayDog" Produce Kōen Godzil no La	Mio Sasaoka	Shinjuku Theater Molière	Leaf role
15, 17 May 2015	"StrayDog" Produce Kōen Godzil no La	Mio Sasaoka	Hep Hall	Leaf role
3–6 Sep 2015	Tengoku no Kyakuhon-ka: Sae Shima Kōki –Watashi no Kyakuhon de, Mōichido Jinsei o Yarinaoshite Mimasen ka–		Ueno Storehouse	
20–23 Sep 2015	"StrayDog" Bangai Kōen =M&M= Frozen Beach		Yawata Mountain Warsall Theater	
3 Nov 2015	Share House O-Mo-Te-Na-Shi Bangai-hen –CinDy no Orushuban–		Aqua studio	
1–6 Mar 2016	"Nobunyaga no Yabō" Bangai Kōen Neko-gungi –Kai neko wa Doitsu Nya?–		Sasazuka Factory	
11–22 May 2016	Gekidan Jikan Seisaku Dai Jū-kai Kōen Hinikunimo Ame wa Furu		Theater Momo	
3–4 Dec 2016	Benibara Usagidan Hon Kōen vol.20 Paraiso no Umi –Chīsana Hana no Yotsuyu ni Utsuru Ysuki–		Shinjuku Village Live	
20–23 Apr 2017	Gekidan Tagumi. Dai 13-kai-me Kōen Mayu o hisomete, Boku o Waratte		Yokohama Red Brick Warehouse No.1 Building 3F Hall	
26 Aug 2017	Kūsō Pell Climb / Les Nankayaru		Nakameguro Kinko Theater	

=== Radio ===
Dates	Title	Network
2010–13	AKB48 no All Night Nippon	NBS
5 May 2013	i-Ban!!	Nack5
24, 31 Jul 2016	Re.Ra.Ku presents Navi Cars Cafe	FM Fuji
28 Nov, 5 Dec 2016	Garyū Jinsei: Tanoshikunakutcha Imiganai	TBS Radio
31 May, 7 Jun 2017	Life on the Wheels powered by Navi Cars	Tokyo FM

=== Video games ===
Year	Title	Role	Publisher
2008	Moeru Mājan: Moejan!	Heiko	Hudson PSP Soft
2017	Idol Festival: Sunshine Stars!		DMM Games
2020	D4DJ Groovy Mix	Rika Seto	Bushiroad

=== Internet ===
Dates	Title	Website
2013–15	Natsumi Hirajima Premiere Hōsō!	AmebaStudio
9 Dec 2015, 24 Mar 2016	Onegai! Ranking: Jidori-tai	TV Asahi
26 Feb 2016	Yū-bari Kokusai Fantastic Eigamatsuri kara Nama Chūkei 2-nichi-me: Natsumi Hirajima to Meguru Eigamatsuri	Niconico Live Broadcast
23 Mar 2016	Sashimeshi #71	Line Live
3 Nov 2016	Amestage: Natsumi Hirajima Special	AmebaStudio
	Akogareno Shigoto Bijo #1	360channel
2 May, 7 Jun 2017	One Eight Channel	live.me
3 Jul 2017	Rakuten Shopping Live TV	Rakuten
8 Aug 2017	Buru-pen –Ima masani Yo ni Deyou to shite iru Attamatta Hitobito ga Tōjō!–	Ustream

=== Internet programs ===
Dates	Title	Website	Ref.
18 Apr 2016	Onegai! Ranking Channel	AbemaTV	
17 Jun 2016, 20 Jan, 27 Mar 2017	Geinō Maru Hi Channel	AbemaTV	
24 Aug 2016	Otona Onagokai	AbemaTV	
12–16 Sep 2016	Bijo Lunch #110-114	AbemaTV	
12 Jul 2017	Onegai! Sō Senkyo	AbemaTV	

== Bibliography ==
=== Photo albums ===
Date	Title	Publisher	Photographer	ISBN
29 Sep 2016	Natsukoi	Kodansha	Takao Tonoki	ISBN 978-4-06-352854-1

=== Calendars ===
Date	Title	Publisher
19 Nov 2011	Natsumi Hirajima 2012-nen Calendar	Hagoromo
4 Oct 2014	Natsumi Hirajima 2015-nen Calendar	Triax
8 Oct 2016	Natsumi Hirajima 2017-nen Calendar	Triax
7 Oct 2017	Natsumi Hirajima 2018-nen Calendar	Triax

=== Trading cards ===
Date	Title	Publisher
20 Sep 2014	Natsumi Hirajima First Trading Card	Hit's
