= List of MNL48 live performances =

MNL48 live performances
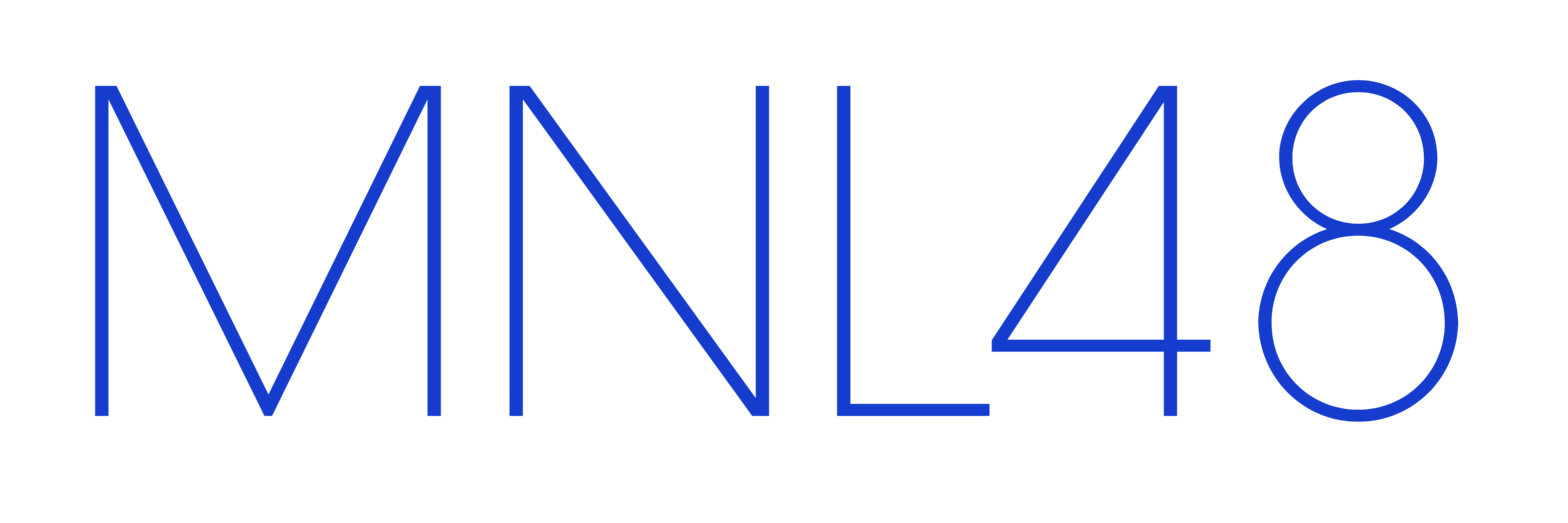
- The group's logo
- Standalone concerts: 3
- International concerts: 3
- Mini concerts: 5
- Collaborative concerts: 2
- Online concerts: 3

This is the list of live performances by the all-girl Filipino idol group MNL48. The group held their first mini concert, MNL48: Christmas Mini Concert 2015 on December 24, 2015, at Movie Stars Cafe, Quezon City. It is their first ever live concert since their debut on April 28, 2015. They also had their first international concert with AKB4 Group, AKB48 Group Asia Festival 2019 in Bangkok on January 27, 2019, at Impact Arena Muang Thong Thani Bangkok, Thailand. On April 6 of the same year, MNL48 held their first major concert, MNL48 First Generation: Living the Dream Concert at New Frontier Theater, Quezon City. On December 20, 2020, the group had their first fundraising concert, KTnX ANG BABAIT NINYO: THE KTX FUNDRAISING CHRISTMAS SPECIAL — P-Pop Rise with P-pop groups Bini, BGYO, and PHP.

== Standalone concerts ==
=== MNL48 First Generation: Living the Dream Concert ===
MNL48 First Generation: Living The Dream Concert
- Major concert by MNL48
- Living the Dream official promotional poster
- Location: Quezon City
- Venue: New Frontier Theater
- Date: April 6, 2019
- Guests: Idol Fairytale
- Producers: Hallo-Hallo Entertainment; Star Music

MNL48 concert chronology
- MNL48 First Generation: Living The Dream Concert; MNL48 Team Concert: No To Oshihen!

On April 6, 2019, MNL48 Held their first major concert at New Frontier Theater, Quezon City, Philippines. This concert featured the first generation members of the group where its tickets were confirmed sold out through their bookings and/or reservations. The show was the first idol concert in the country, and it was directed by GB Sampedro.

==== Setlist ====
1. Aitakatta - Gustong Makita
2. Tara PARTY
3. Manila48
4. First Rabbit (Team MII)
5. Labrador Retriever (Team MII)
6. 1!2!3!4! YOROSHIKU! (Team NIV)
7. Palusot Ko'y Maybe (Team NIV)
8. Umiindak na Saya (Team L)
9. Igai ni Mango (Team L)
10. Amazing Grace (MNL48 Gospel Unit)
11. 365 Araw ng Eroplanong Papel (Senbatsu)
12. BINGO! (Senbatsu)
13. Heavy Rotation (Senbatsu)
14. Aisatsu kara Hajimeyou
15. Talulot ng Sakura

==== Encore ====
1. Placard ng Aking Puso
2. Pag-Ibig Fortune Cookie

=== MNL48 Team Concert: No To Oshihen! ===
MNL48 Team Concert: No To Oshihen!
- Team concert by MNL48
- No To Oshihen promotional poster
- Venue: Movie Stars Cafe (Team MII and Team NIV); TIU Theater (Team L)
- Start date: October 6, 2019
- End date: October 20, 2019
- Producers: Hallo-Hallo Entertainment; Star Music

MNL48 concert chronology
- MNL48 First Generation: Living the Dream Concert; MNL48 Team Concert: No To Oshihen!; MNL48: Magical Night of Love Christmas Concert

This is MNL48's first solo team concerts that was held on October 6, 2019, to October 20, 2019, at Movie Stars Cafe and TIU Theater.

==== Setlist ====
===== Team MII Concert at Movie Stars Cafe on October 6, 2019 =====
1. Fighter (Christina Aguillera cover)
2. We Will Rock You (Queen cover)
3. First Rabbit
4. Labrador Retriever
5. Bohemian Rhapsody (Queen cover)
6. Last Dance (Donna Summer cover)
7. You Can't Stop The Beat (Hairspray cover)
8. This is Me (The Greatest Showman cover)
9. So long!
10. Ikaw ang Melody
11. Aitakatta - Gustong Makita
12. 365 Araw ng Eroplanong Papel
13. Placard ng Aking Puso
14. Talulot ng Sakura

====== Team MII Encore ======
1. Manila48
2. Pag-Ibig Fortune Cookie

===== Team NIV Concert at Movie Stars Cafe on October 13, 2019 =====
1. 1!2!3!4! YOROSHIKU!
2. BINGO!
3. PARTY ga Hajimaru yo
4. Dances Around the World
5. Locked Out of Heaven (Bruno Mars Cover)
6. Señorita/Let's Get Loud (Camella Cabello/Jennifer Lopez Cover)
7. Sumayaw Ka (Gloc9 Cover)
8. Sweet But Psycho (Ava Max Cover)
9. Fansa (HoneyWorks feat. Mona Cover)
10. Scars to Your Beautiful (Alessia Cara Cover)
11. Pag-Ibig Fortune Cookie
12. 365 Araw ng Eroplanong Papel and Ikaw ang Melody Medley (Acoustic version)
13. Talulot ng Sakura

====== Team NIV Encore ======
1. Palusot Ko'y Maybe
2. Manila48

===== Team L Concert at TIU Theater on October 20, 2019 =====
1. Igai ni Mango
2. PARTY ga Hajimaru yo
3. Manila48
4. Sugar Rush / Candy
5. Nekkoya
6. Glass wo Ware!
7. Mr. Taxi (SNSD JP ver.)
8. Imagine Dragons
9. 365 Araw ng Eroplanong Papel
10. Umiindak na Saya
11. Aitakatta - Gustong Makita
12. Pag-Ibig Fortune Cookie
13. Dalawang Pag-ibig Niya

==== Team L Encore ====
1. Talulot ng Sakura (Acoustic version)
2. Aisatsu kara Hajimeyou

=== MNL48 Christmas Concert: Magical Night of Love ===
MNL48 Christmas Concert "Magical Night of Love"
- Christmas concert by MNL48
- Location: San Juan
- Venue: Music Museum
- Date: December 15, 2022
- Producer: Hallo-hallo Entertainment

MNL48 concert chronology
- MNL48 Team Concert: No To Oshihen!; MNL48 Christmas Concert "Magical Night of Love"

This concert happened on December 15, 2022, at Music Museum, San Juan. MNL48's overall captain announced her first Solo Song "Tell Me" that was released on December 21, of the same year.

==== Setlist ====
1. RIVER
2. Talulot ng Sakura
3. NO WAY MAN
4. Labrador Retriever
5. Gingham Check
6. Ikaw ang Melody
7. 1!2!3!4! YOROSHIKU!
8. Umiindak na Saya
9. BINGO! (Band Version)
10. Igai ni Mango (Band Version)
11. Palusot Ko'y Maybe (Band Version)
12. Santa Tell Me (cover of Ariana Grande)
13. Time After Time
14. O Holy Night (Shekinah Arzaga)
15. Paskong Kasama ka
16. First Rabbit
17. 365 Araw ng Eroplanong Papel (Christmas Remix)
18. Manila48
19. Aitakatta - Gustong Makita
20. Pag-Ibig Fortune Cookie

== International concerts ==
=== AKB48 Group Asia Festival 2019 in Bangkok ===
AKB48 Group Asia Festival 2019 in Bangkok
- International concert by MNL48 with AKB48 Group
- AKB48 Asia Festival Bangkok promotional poster
- Location: Bangkok, Thailand
- Venue: IMPACT Arena,
- Date: January 27, 2019
- Producer: Shanda Games

MNL48 with AKB48 Group concert chronology
- AKB48 Group Asia Festival 2019 in Bangkok; AKB48 Group Asia Festival 2019 in Shanghai

On December 11, 2018, AKS announced that MNL48 will join the "AKB48 Group Asia Festival 2019" that was held on January 27, 2019, in Bangkok, Thailand at the IMPACT Arena, Muang Thong Thani. The group will perform with their sister groups AKB48, JKT48, BNK48, AKB48 Team SH, AKB48 Team TP and SGO48. MNL48 members Abby, Brei, Coleen, Faith, Gabb, Jem, Mari, Rans, Sela and Sheki went to the event. it featured MNL48 with AKB48 Group.

==== MNL48 Mini Concert Setlist ====
1. Aitakatta - Gustong Makita (Acoustic version)
2. Paluost Ko'y Maybe (Acoustic version)
3. Pag-Ibig Fortune Cookie (Acoustic version)

==== MNL48 Main Concert Setlist ====
1. Tara PARTY
2. First Rabbit
3. Palusot Ko'y Maybe
4. Heavy Rotation (Abby and Sheki with WRD48)
5. Blue rose (Shekinah Arzaga with Cindy Yuvia, Punsikorn Tiyakorn (Pun), Võ Phan Kim Khánh)
6. End Roll (Abelaine Trinidad with Mao WeiJia, Shani Indira Natio, Jennis Oprasert)
7. Kimi no Koto ga Suki Dakara (with AKB48 Group)
8. After Rain (with AKB48 Group)
9. Everyday, Kachuusha (with AKB48 Group)
10. Sakura no Hanabiratachi (with AKB48 Group)

===== Encore =====
1. AKB Festival (with AKB48 Group)
2. Koi Suru Fortune Cookie (with AKB48 Group)

=== AKB48 Group Asia Festival 2019 in Shanghai ===
AKB48 Group Asia Festival 2019 in Shanghai
- International concert by MNL48 with AKB48 Group
- AKB48 Asia Festival Shanghai promotional poster
- Location: Shanghai, China
- Venue: National Exhibition and Convention Center
- Date: August 24, 2019

MNL48 with AKB48 Group concert chronology
- AKB48 Group Asia Festival 2019 in Bangkok; AKB48 Group Asia Festival 2019 in Shanghai; AKB48 Group Asia Festival 2021 Online

A total of eight members from MNL48 will be flying to Shanghai, China for the AKB48 Group Asia Festival 2019 Shanghai, to be held at the National Exhibition and Convention Center on August 24. They will join AKB48 themselves, AKB48's Team SH and Team TP, and their other international sister groups based in Thailand, Indonesia, and Vietnam. This is the second time MNL48 will be performing abroad, with the first being in the AKB48 Asia Festival in Bangkok last January. Their performance of their a cappella rendition of their single, "365 Araw ng Eroplanong Papel." then went viral on twitter.

==== MNL48 Mini Concert Setlist ====
1. Time After Time (Song By Cyndi Lauper)
2. Tala
3. 365 Araw ng Eroplanong (Acapella version)

==== MNL48 Main Concert Setlist ====
1. AKB Sanjou! (with AKB48 Group)
2. Aitakatta (with AKB48 Group)
3. Only Today (with AKB48 Group)
4. BINGO!
5. Ikaw ang Melody
6. RIVER (Abby and Sheki with WRD48)
7. Kimi Dake ni Chu! Chu! Chu! (Rans and Colleen with Oguri Yui, Lin Yu-hsin, Sin Tik-kei, Li ShiQi, and Zhu Ling)
8. Kiseki wa Ma ni Awanai (Sheki with Mao WeiJia, and Sachi)
9. Confession (Abby with Liu Yu-ching, Shani Indira Natio, and Liu Nian)
10. Nante Suteki na Sekai ni Umareta no Darou (with AKB48 Group)
11. Honest Man (with AKB48 Group)
12. EDM Remix Medley (with AKB48 Group)
13. Yuuhi wo Miteiru ka? (with AKB48 Group)

===== Encore =====
1. AKB Festival (with AKB48 Group)
2. Koi Suru Fortune Cookie (with AKB48 Group)
3. Kimi to Niji to Taiyou to (with AKB48 Group)

=== AKB48 Group Asia Festival 2021 Online ===
==== MNL48 Mini Concert Setlist ====
1. High Tension (Gabrielle Skribikin Center)

==== MNL48 Main Concert Setlist ====
1. Aitakatta (with AKB48, AKB48 Team SH, BNK48 and JKT48)
2. MC (with AKB48 Group)
3. 365nichi no Kamihikouki (with AKB48 Group)

== Mini concerts ==
No.	Title	Date(s)	Place	Notes	Ref(s)
1	MNL48: Christmas Mini Concert 2018	December 14, 2018	Movie Stars Cafe, Quezon City	First mini concert	
2	MNL48 Valentine's Mini Live Concert	February 17, 2019	Movie Stars Cafe, Quezon City		
3	MNL48 Coslandia Mini Concert	November 2, 2019	SMX Convention Center Aura, Taguig	Coslandia day 2, 5th single promotion.	
4	MNL48 Christmas Live Mini Concert: Give Love on Christmas Day	December 22, 2019	Movie Stars Cafe, Quezon City		
5	MNL48 In Love: Valentines Mini Live Concert	February 16, 2020	Movie Stars Cafe, Quezon City		

== Collaborative concerts ==
=== PPOPCON ===
Pinoy Pop Convention and Concert
- Concert by various P-pop artists
- PPOPCON logo
- Location: Quezon City
- Venue: New Frontier Theater; Araneta Coliseum

MNL48 graced the first-ever Pinoy Pop Convention (PPOPCON) in the country, the P-Pop Con 2022. The concert kicked off at the New Frontier Theater on April 9, 2022, while the much-anticipated concert took place in the Big Dome the next day, April 10. Aside from MNL48, other groups that attended the PPOPCON are BGYO, BINI, SB19, Alamat, Press Hit Play, G22, KAIA, VXON, and 4th Impact.

PPOPCON Events
No.	Event	Date(s)	Setlist	Personnel
1	PPOPCON 2022	April 9–10, 2022	Palusot Ko'y Maybe; High Tension; NO WAY MAN	Abby, Andi, Coleen, Dana, Dian, Ella, Jamie, Jan, Jem, Lara, Lyza, Princess, Rianna, Ruth, Sheki, Yzabel
2	PPOPCON 2023	July 14–16, 2023	Pag-ibig Fortune Cookie; Green Flash; Manila48 (PPOPCON version); Tell Me (Sheki solo)	Amy, CJ, Cole, Coleen, Dana, Ella, Jem, Kath, Klaire, Klaryle, Lara, Lyza, Miho, Rachel, Sheki, Yzabel

=== Tugatog: Filipino Music Festival ===
Tugatog: Filipino Music Festival
- Concert by Various P-Pop artists
- Tugatog official poster
- Location: Pasay
- Venue: Mall of Asia Arena
- Date: July 15, 2022
- Producers: Ant Savvy Creatives, Inc. KUMU; Realme; Ulam Mama.

On July 15, 2022, A total of 18 P-POP acts including MNL48 joined forces for the first-ever Tugatog: Filipino Music Festival,at the SM Mall of Asia Arena in Pasay City. This music festival was produced by Ant Savvy Creatives, Inc. and co-presented by KUMU, realme, and powered by Ulam Mama. The line-up also includes other P-Pop groups like BGYO, BINI, ALAMAT, PPOP Generation, VXON, LITZ, first.One, Press Hit Play, Dione, Calista, R Rules, G22, DAYDREAM, and YARA. Fifteen members of MNL48 started the music festival as they march their way to the stage and performed their sixth single "River." The group also performed the songs "Pag-ibig Fortune Cookie" and "Ikaw Ang Melody" onstage, and during the group's performance of their song "365 Araw ng Eroplanong Papel", the concert hall was filled with paper plains as fans started flying them on air. MNL48 also collaborated with BGYO and performed a mash-up version of their songs "High Tension" and "Sabay."

==== MNL48 Setlist ====
1. River (with BINI and PPop Generation)
2. Pag-Ibig Fortune Cookie
3. Ikaw ang Melody
4. 365 Araw ng Eroplanong Papel
5. High Tension (with BGYO)

== Online concerts ==
No.	Title	Date(s)	Place	Notes	Ref(s)
1	ONE LOVE ASIA	May 27, 2020	live-streamed on YouTube and WebTV ASIA	Various Asian idol groups are on the setlist	
2	KTnX ANG BABAIT NINYO: THE KTX FUNDRAISING CHRISTMAS SPECIAL — P-Pop Rise	December 20, 2020	ABS-CBN Broadcasting Center, Quezon City	Collaboration with P-Pop Groups Bini, BGYO, and PHP.	
3	AKB48 Group Asia Festival 2021 Online	June 27, 2021	Tokyo Dome City Hall, Tokyo, Japan	Featuring MNL48 with AKB48 Group.	

== Live shows ==
No.	Title	Date(s)	Place	Notes	Ref(s)
1	Santa Maria Town Fest	February 16, 2019	La Purisima Concepcion Parish, Santa Maria, Bulacan	Non-senbatsu members	
2	Lipa Love Fest	February 16, 2019	Olan's Place, Lipa, Batangas	Non-senbatsu members	
3	Pokémon Sword and Shield Launch	November 17, 2019	Robinsons Magnolia, Quezon City		
4	Fumiya: Amazing 'Di Ba?	November 19, 2019	Music Museum, San Juan	Special guests	
5	Grab Philippines All-Out Summer	April 17, 2023	Market! Market! Taguig		
6	MNL48 in Archon Cebu 2023	November 18–19, 2023	IC3 Convention Center; Cebu City	First MNL48 event in Visayas	
7	Playlist Live Festival	March 3, 2024	Tritan Point; Bandung, Indonesia		
