= Romance, Irane =

Single by AKB48

from the album Set List: Greatest Songs Complete Edition
- B-side: "Ai no Mōfu"
- Released: January 23, 2008
- Genre: Pop
- Length: 4:40:00
- Label: Defstar
- Songwriter(s): Yasushi Akimoto, Rie, Hideki Naruse
- Producer(s): Yasushi Akimoto

AKB48 singles chronology
"Yūhi o Miteiru ka?" (2007)	"Romance, Irane" (2008)	"Sakura no Hanabiratachi 2008" (2008)

Romance, Irane' (ロマンス、イラネ, Romansu, Irane, Romance, no need) is Japanese idol group AKB48's ninth single, and the seventh major single released through DefSTAR Records, on January 23, 2008. This song was sung with 16 "Senbatsu" members, six members more than the previous single "Yūhi o Miteiru ka?". Therefore, five members were chosen as Senbatsu members again, and Ayaka Kikuchi was selected for the first time.

- Team A - Tomomi Itano, Haruna Kojima, Atsuko Maeda, Minami Minegishi, Mai Oshima, Yukari Sato, Mariko Shinoda, Minami Takahashi, Hana Tojima
- Team K - Sayaka Akimoto, Tomomi Kasai, Sae Miyazawa, Erena Ono, Yuko Oshima
- Team B - Ayaka Kikuchi, Mayu Watanabe

== Promotion ==
"Romance, Irane" was the third single released within 4 month since "BINGO!"'s release.

Video clip of "Romance, Irane" was filmed by Wataru Takeishi, who filmed a music clip of "BINGO!". Video clip was filmed at a studio in Tokyo Tower.

As same as previous single "Yūhi o Miteiru ka?", CDs were released in 3 different editions. Each of "Shokai Seisan Genteiban A" (初回生産限定版A, The first edition A) included a bonus DVDs with "Romance, Irane"'s video clip and its making clip, but "Shokai Seisan Genteiban B" (初回生産限定版B, The first edition B) and "Tsūjōban" (通常版, Regular Edition) did not include giveaway.

Although not chosen as Senbatsu members, Kayo Noro from Team K and Natsuki Sato from Team B were appeared on video clip as well as TV commercial.

== Reception ==
The single charted 5 weeks in the top 200 with the highest rank at #6. "Romance, Irane" sold 23,209 copies during its 5 weeks on the Oricon charts.

== Track listing ==
Regular Edition (通常版) Limited First Edition A (初回限定版A)

No.	Title	Writer(s)	Arranger	Length
1.	"Romance, Irane" (ロマンス、イラネ)	Yasushi Akimoto, Rie	CHOKKAKU	4:40
2.	"Ai no Mōfu"	Akimoto, Hideki Naruse	Nobuhiko Kashiwara	5:01
3.	"Romance, Irane (Original Mix, Instrumental)"	Akimoto, Rie	CHOKKAKU	4:40
4.	"Ai no Mōfu (Instrumental)"	Akimoto, Naruse	Kashiwara	5:01
Total length:				19:20

Limited First Edition B (初回限定版B)

No.	Title	Writer(s)	Arranger	Length
1.	"Romance, Irane" (ロマンス、イラネ)	Yasushi Akimoto, Rie	CHOKKAKU	4:40
2.	"Ai no Mōfu"	Akimoto, Hideki Naruse	Nobuhiko Kashiwara	5:01
3.	"Romance, Irane (Himawari 2.0 Mix)"	Akimoto, Rie	CHOKKAKU	4:40
4.	"Romance, Irane (Himawari 2.1 Mix)"	Akimoto, Rie	CHOKKAKU	4:40
5.	"Romance, Irane (Original Mix, Instrumental)"	Akimoto, Rie	CHOKKAKU	4:40
6.	"Ai no Mōfu (Instrumental)"	Akimoto, Naruse	Kashiwara	5:01
Total length:				28:43

== Charts ==
Chart	Peak position
Romance, Irane
Oricon Weekly Chart	6

=== Reported sales ===
Chart	Amount
Oricon physical sales	23,000
