= Yūhi o Miteiru ka? =

Single by AKB48

Single by AKB48

from the album Set List: Greatest Songs 2006–2007
- B-side: "Viva!Hurricane"
- Released: October 31, 2007
- Genre: J-pop; R&B
- Length: 4:58
- Label: Defstar
- Songwriter(s): Yasushi Akimoto, Mio Okada, Yoshimasa Inoue
- Producer(s): Yasushi Akimoto

AKB48 singles chronology
"Boku no Taiyō" (2007)	"Yūhi o Miteiru ka?" (2007)	"Romance, Irane" (2008)

Yūhi o Miteiru ka?' (夕陽を見ているか?, Are You Watching the Sunset?) is Japanese idol group AKB48's eighth single, and the sixth major single released through DefSTAR Records, on October 31, 2007. Although it reached only number 10 on the Oricon charts, it is considered one of the group's favorite songs.

== Promotion ==
The title track was sung with only ten members, the least number since the selection (選抜, senbatsu) process was introduced for the group. Four members who had sung on the group's previous single, "Boku no Taiyō", were not chosen. "Yūhi o Miteiru ka?" was the third single released within four months since "BINGO!"'s release, and the fifth single released in 2007.

Music clip of "Yūhi o Miteiru ka?" was filmed by Eiki Takahashi, who filmed a music clip of "Keibetsu Shiteita Aijō. Outdoor scenes were filmed in Nagano Prefecture, including Yagisawa Station of Ueda Electric Railway Bessho Line.

Each of "Shokai Seisan Genteiban A" (初回生産限定版A, The first edition A) included a bonus DVDs with previous single "Boku no Taiyō"'s video clip and its making clip, and each of "Shokai Seisan Genteiban B" (初回生産限定版B, The first edition B) and "Tsūjōban" (通常版, Regular Edition) included a ticket for fan events in Tokyo and Osaka.

== Members ==
=== Yūhi o Miteiru ka? ===
The title track was sung by the following members:

- Team A: Tomomi Itano, Haruna Kojima*, Atsuko Maeda*, Minami Minegishi, Minami Takahashi
- Team K: Tomomi Kasai*, Sae Miyazawa*, Erena Ono, Yuko Oshima
- Team B: Mayu Watanabe*

The center performers for the single were Haruna Kojima and Atsuko Maeda.

== Reception ==
The single charted only 3 weeks in the top 200 with the highest rank at number 10. "Yūhi o Miteiru ka?" only sold 18,429 copies, the lowest performing single to date., although Yasushi Akimoto assumed it as his best song before releasing it and he and many AKB48 members claim it as their favorite song in the AKB48 repertoire.

== Track listing ==
Regular Edition (通常版)

All lyrics are written by Yasushi Akimoto

No.	Title	Music	Arranger	Length
1.	"Yūhi o Miteiru ka?" (夕陽を見ているか?)	Mio Okada	Tomoaki Takashima	4:58
2.	"Viva!Hurricane"	Yoshimasa Inoue	Inoue	4:00
3.	"Yūhi o Miteiru ka? (Original Mix, Instrumental)"	Okada	Takashima	4:58
Total length:				13:57

Limited First Edition A (初回限定版A)

All lyrics are written by Yasushi Akimoto

No.	Title	Music	Arranger	Length
1.	"Yūhi o Miteiru ka?" (夕陽を見ているか?)	Mio Okada	Tomoaki Takashima	4:58
2.	"Viva!Hurricane"	Yoshimasa Inoue	Inoue	4:00
3.	"Yūhi o Miteiru ka? (Original Mix, Instrumental)"	Okada	Takashima	4:58
4.	"Viva!Hurricane (Instrumental)"	Inoue	Inoue	4:00
Total length:				17:56

Limited First Edition B (初回限定版B)

All lyrics are written by Yasushi Akimoto

No.	Title	Music	Arranger	Length
1.	"Yūhi o Miteiru ka?" (夕陽を見ているか?)	Mio Okada	Tomoaki Takashima	4:58
2.	"Viva!Hurricane"	Yoshimasa Inoue	Inoue	4:00
3.	"Yūhi o Miteiru ka? (Himawari 2.0 Mix)"	Okada	Takashima	4:55
4.	"Yūhi o Miteiru ka? (Himawari 2.1 Mix)"	Okada	Takashima	4:55
5.	"Yūhi o Miteiru ka? (Original Mix, Instrumental)"	Okada	Takashima	4:58
6.	"Viva!Hurricane (Instrumental)"	Inoue	Inoue	4:00
Total length:				27:57

== Charts ==
Chart	Peak position	Sales
Oricon Weekly Chart	10	18,429

== JKT48 version ==
"Yuuhi wo miteiru ka? -Apakah Kau Melihat Mentari Senja?-"
- Regular Edition

Single by JKT48
- B-side: Nagai Hikari -Cahaya Panjang-; 1! 2! 3! 4! Yoroshiku; Viva! Hurricane (Regular Edition)
- Released: July 3, 2013
- Genre: Pop
- Label: Hits

JKT48 singles chronology
"River" (2013)	"Yuuhi wo miteiru ka? -Apakah Kau Melihat Mentari Senja?-" (2013)	"Fortune Cookie In Love -Fortune Cookie Yang Mencinta-" (2013)

An Indonesian version of the song, "Yuuhi wo miteiru ka? -Apakah Kau Melihat Mentari Senja?-", was released on July 3, 2013 by AKB48's sister group JKT48. It would mark the group's second single release, as well as the first single that involved the newly formed Team KIII.

=== Release ===
The single has two versions: Regular Edition (CD+DVD) and Theater Edition (CD only). The Regular Edition contained a photo. The first ten thousand CDs contained a special photo of Team KIII. The Theater Edition came with a trump card and a handshake ticket.

=== Track listing ===
==== Regular Edition ====
CD
No.	Title	Writer(s)	Length
1.	"Yuuhi wo miteiru ka? -Apakah Kau Melihat Mentari Senja?-"	Yasushi Akimoto	4:55
2.	"Nagai Hikari -Cahaya Panjang-"		6:00
3.	"1! 2! 3! 4! Yoroshiku!"		5:03
4.	"Viva! Hurricane"		3:58

DVD
No.	Title	Length
1.	"Yuuhi wo miteiru ka? -Apakah Kau Melihat Mentari Senja?- Music Video"
2.	"Yuuhi wo miteiru ka? -Apakah Kau Melihat Mentari Senja?- Making Video Behind the Scenes"

==== Theater Edition ====
CD
No.	Title	Writer(s)	Length
1.	"Yuuhi wo miteiru ka? -Apakah Kau Melihat Mentari Senja?-"	Yasushi Akimoto
2.	"Nagai Hikari -Cahaya Panjang-"
3.	"1! 2! 3! 4! Yoroshiku!"

=== JKT48 Personnel ===
==== "Yuuhi wo miteiru ka? -Apakah Kau Melihat Senja?-" ====
Center: Jessica Veranda, Melody Nurramdhani Laksani

- Team J: Haruka Nakagawa, Jessica Veranda, Melody Nurramdhani Laksani, Nabilah Ratna Ayu Azalia, Shania Junianatha
- Team KIII: Cindy Yuvia, Natalia, Ratu Vienny Fitrilya, Rona Anggreani, Shinta Naomi

==== " Nagai Hikari- Cahaya Panjang -" ====
- Team J: Aki Takajo, Ayana Shahab, Beby Chaesara Anadila, Cindy Gulla, Devi Kinal Putri, Gabriela Margareth Warouw, Ghaida Fairsya, Haruka Nakagawa, Jessica Vania, Jessica Veranda, Melody Nurramdhani Laksani, Nabilah Ratna Ayu, Rena Nozawa, Rezky Wiranti Dhike, Sendy Ariani, Shania Junianatha

==== "1! 2! 3! 4! Yoroshiku!" ====
- Team KIII: Alicia Chanzia, Cindy Yuvia, Della Delila, Intar Putri Kariina, Jennifer Hanna, Lidya Maulida Djuhandar, Nadila Cindy Wantari, Natalia, Noella Sisterina, Ratu Vienny Fitrilya, Riskha Fairunissa, Rona Anggreani, Shinta Naomi, Sinka Juliani, Thalia, Viviyona Apriani

==== "Viva! Hurricane" ====
- Team KIII: Alicia Chanzia, Cindy Yuvia, Della Delila, Intar Putri Kariina, Jennifer Hanna, Lidya Maulida Djuhandar, Nadila Cindy Wantari, Natalia, Noella Sisterina, Ratu Vienny Fitrilya, Riskha Fairunissa, Rona Anggreani, Shinta Naomi, Sinka Juliani, Thalia, Viviyona Apriani
