= Set List: Greatest Songs 2006–2007 =

Set List: Greatest Songs 2006-2007

Greatest hits album by AKB48
- Released: January 1, 2008
- Genre: J-pop
- Label: Defstar

AKB48 chronology
Set List: Greatest Songs 2006-2007 (2008)	Kamikyokutachi (2010)
Kamikyokutachi (2010)	Set List: Greatest Songs Kanzenban (2010)	Koko ni Ita Koto (2011)

Alternative covers
- Limited edition featuring Megumi Ōhori.

Alternative cover
- Kanzenban edition cover.

Set List: Greatest Songs 2006–2007 (SET LIST～グレイテストソングス 2006-2007～) is a greatest hits album by AKB48, released on January 1, 2008. It was re-released on July 14, 2010 as Set List: Greatest Songs Kanzenban (SET LIST～グレイテストソングス～完全盤, Complete Edition) with four new tracks: the singles "Romance, Irane" and Sakura no Hanabiratachi 2008", along with brand new songs "Seventeen" and "Anata ga Ite Kureta Kara" (あなたがいてくれたから, Because You Were with Me).

AKB48 had released six albums prior to the release of this album, but those were just a collection of songs each team sang at the AKB48 theater. They are also known as stage albums. This is the first album that they have released as a group. There are 33 tracks in total. However, songs are only recorded up to the 13th track; the rest are 20 members who were chosen to say, "Aitakatta" (wanted to meet you).

Limited edition cover is the back view of Team K member, Megumi Ohori. The first pressing of the Kanzenban edition comes in a cardboard slip cover with a random member photo and an application card.

== Track listings ==
=== Set List: Greatest Songs 2006-2007 (Regular Edition CD) ===
DFCL-1431

1. "Aitakatta" (会いたかった)
2. "Bingo!"
3. "Yūhi o Miteiru ka?" (夕陽を見ているか?)
4. "Boku no Taiyō" (僕の太陽)
5. "Mirai no Kajitsu" (未来の果実)
6. "Dear My Teacher" (Team A Ver.)
7. "Skirt, Hirari" (スカート、ひらり) (Album Mix)
8. "Seifuku ga Jama o Suru" (制服が邪魔をする)
9. "Virgin Love" (Album Mix)
10. "Keibetsu Shiteita Aijō" (軽蔑していた愛情)
11. "Tanjōbi no Yoru" (誕生日の夜) (Team A)
12. "Korogaru Ishi ni Nare" (転がる石になれ) (Team K)
13. "Sakura no Hanabiratachi" (桜の花びらたち)
14. "Aitakatta (Akimoto Sayaka ver.)" (会いたかった (秋元才加ver.))
15. "Aitakatta (Itano Tomomi ver.)" (会いたかった (板野友美ver.))
16. "Aitakatta (Umeda Ayaka ver.)" (会いたかった (梅田彩佳ver.))
17. "Aitakatta (Ohe Tomomi ver.)" (会いたかった (大江朝美ver.))
18. "Aitakatta (Oshima Mai ver.)" (会いたかった (大島麻衣ver.))
19. "Aitakatta (Oshima Yuko ver.)" (会いたかった (大島優子ver.))
20. "Aitakatta (Ono Erena ver.)" (会いたかった (小野恵令奈ver.))
21. "Aitakatta (Kasai Tomomi ver.)" (会いたかった (河西智美ver.))
22. "Aitakatta (Kobayashi Kana ver.)" (会いたかった (小林香菜ver.))
23. "Aitakatta (Kojima Haruna ver.)" (会いたかった (小嶋陽菜ver.))
24. "Aitakatta (Shinoda Mariko ver.)" (会いたかった (篠田麻里子ver.))
25. "Aitakatta (Takahashi Minami ver.)" (会いたかった (高橋みなみver.))
26. "Aitakatta (Tojima Hana ver.)" (会いたかった (戸島花ver.))
27. "Aitakatta (Nakanishi Rina ver.)" (会いたかった (中西里菜ver.))
28. "Aitakatta (Narita Risa ver.)" (会いたかった (成田梨紗ver.))
29. "Aitakatta (Noro Kayo ver.)" (会いたかった (野呂佳代ver.))
30. "Aitakatta (Maeda Atsuko ver.)" (会いたかった (前田敦子ver.))
31. "Aitakatta (Matsubara Natsumi ver.)" (会いたかった (松原夏海ver.))
32. "Aitakatta (Minegishi Minami ver.)" (会いたかった (峯岸みなみver.))
33. "Aitakatta (Miyazawa Sae ver.)" (会いたかった (宮澤佐江ver.))

=== Set List: Greatest Songs 2006-2007 (Limited Edition CD+DVD) ===
DFCL-1429/30

1. "Aitakatta" (会いたかった)
2. "Bingo!"
3. "Yūhi o Miteiru ka?" (夕陽を見ているか?)
4. "Boku no Taiyō" (僕の太陽)
5. "Mirai no Kajitsu" (未来の果実)
6. "Dear My Teacher" (Team A Ver.)
7. "Skirt, Hirari" (スカート、ひらり) (Album Mix)
8. "Seifuku ga Jama o Suru" (制服が邪魔をする)
9. "Virgin Love" (Album Mix)
10. "Keibetsu Shiteita Aijō" (軽蔑していた愛情)
11. "Tanjōbi no Yoru" (誕生日の夜) (Team A)
12. "Korogaru Ishi ni Nare" (転がる石になれ) (Team K)
13. "Sakura no Hanabiratachi" (桜の花びらたち)

DVD:

1. "Yūhi o Miteiru ka?" (夕陽を見ているか?) (Video Clip)
2. Making of "Yūhi o Miteiru ka?" (夕陽を見ているか?)
3. "Kibun wa Chotto, Oshōgatsu" (気分はちょっと、お正月・・・。)

=== Set List: Greatest Songs Kanzenban (Re-release CD) ===
DFCL-1653

1. "Aitakatta" (会いたかった)
2. "Bingo!"
3. "Yūhi o Miteiru ka?" (夕陽を見ているか?)
4. "Boku no Taiyō" (僕の太陽)
5. "Mirai no Kajitsu" (未来の果実)
6. "Dear My Teacher" (Team A Ver.)
7. "Skirt, Hirari" (スカート、ひらり) (Album Mix)
8. "Seifuku ga Jama o Suru" (制服が邪魔をする)
9. "Virgin Love" (Album Mix)
10. "Keibetsu Shiteita Aijō" (軽蔑していた愛情)
11. "Tanjōbi no Yoru" (誕生日の夜) (Team A)
12. "Korogaru Ishi ni Nare" (転がる石になれ) (Team K)
13. "Sakura no Hanabiratachi" (桜の花びらたち)
14. "Romance, Irane" (ロマンス、イラネ)
15. "Sakura no Hanabiratachi 2008" (桜のはなびらたち 2008)
16. "Seventeen"
17. "Anata ga Ite Kureta Kara" (あなたがいてくれたから)

== Release history ==
Region	Date	Format	Label
Japan	January 1, 2008	CD; digital download; streaming	SME Records
South Korea	November 9, 2018	digital download; streaming	Sony Music Korea
