= Ayaka Kikuchi (singer) =

Japanese singer and actress (born 1993)

Ayaka Kikuchi 菊地 あやか
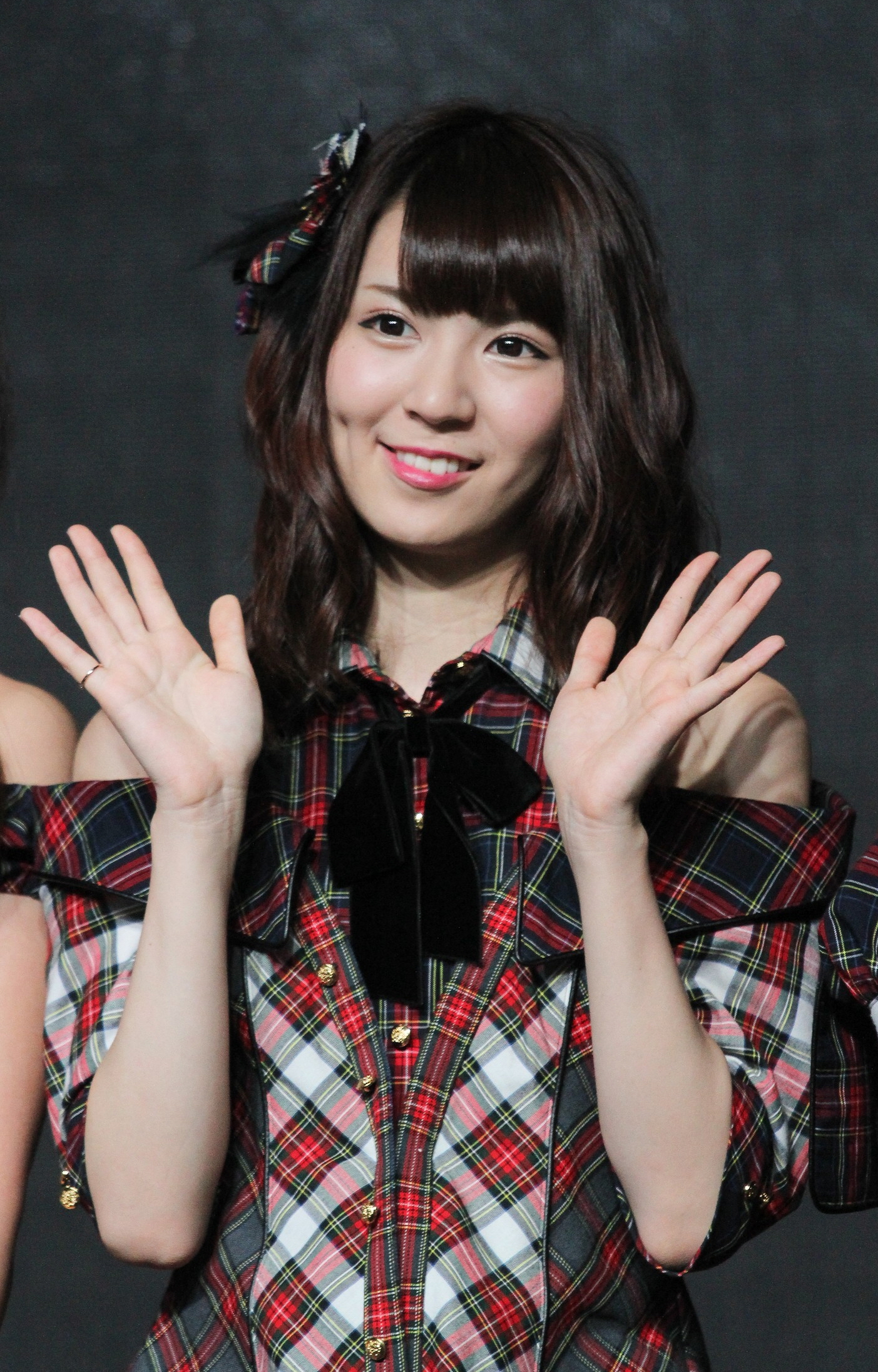
- Ayaka Kikuchi as a member of AKB48

Background information
- Also known as: Ayarin (あやりん); Kikuji (きくぢ)
- Born: 30 June 1993 (age 32); Katsushika, Tokyo, Japan
- Genres: J-pop
- Occupations: Singer, model, actress
- Years active: 2007 –
- Labels: King Records
- Formerly of: Watarirouka Hashiritai 7

Ayaka Kikuchi (菊地 あやか, 菊地 彩香, Kikuchi Ayaka) (born 30 June 1993) is a Japanese singer, actress, former model and former member of idol group AKB48.

== Biography ==
Kikuchi was born in Katsushika, Tokyo. She was a member of AKB48, but was fired after it was revealed that she broke the "boyfriend's prohibited" policy of her management agency. She was a member of Team B and had returned to AKB48 as one of the seventh generation AKB48 Research Students, later Team K and finally Team A. She was represented by AKS and Production Ogi until 2016.

== Discography ==
=== Singles ===
Single	Song	Member of	Ref.
"Romance, Irane"			
"Sakura no Hanabiratachi"			
"Baby! Baby! Baby!"			
"River"	"Kimi no koto ga Sukidakara"	Under Girls	
"Sakura no Shiori"	"Choose me!"	Team YJ	
"Ponytail to Shushu"	"Nusuma reta Kuchibiru"	Under Girls	
"Beginner"	"Boku dake no value"	Under Girls	
"Chance no Junban"	"Alive"	Team K	
"Sakura no Ki ni Narō"	"Gūzen no Jūjiro"	Under Girls	
"Everyday, Katyusha"			
"Flying Get"	"Seishun to Kizukanai mama"		
"Kaze wa Fuiteiru"	"Kimi no Senaka"	Under Girls	
"Ue kara Mariko"	"Zero Sam Taiyō"	Team K	
"Give Me Five!"	"Hitsujikai no Tabi"	Special Girls B	
"Manatsu no Sounds Good!"	"3Ttsu no Namida"	Special Girls	
"Gingham Check"	"Show fight!"	Future Girls	
"Uza"	"Kodokuna Hoshizora"	Team A	
"Eien Pressure"	"Watashitachi no Reason"		
"So Long!"	"Waiting room"	Under Girls	
"So Long!"	"Ruby"	Shinoda Team A	
"Sayonara Crawl"	"Ikirukoto"	Team A	
"Koi Suru Fortune Cookie"	"Suitei Marmalade"	Future Girls	
"Heart Electric"	"Kaisoku to Dōtai Shiryoku"	Under Girls	
"Heart Electric"	"Kiss made Countdown"	Team A	
"Suzukake no Ki no Michi de "Kimi no Hohoemi o Yume ni Miru" to Itte Shimattara Bokutachi no Kankei wa Dō Kawatte Shimau no ka, Bokunari ni Nannichi ka Kangaeta Ue de no Yaya Kihazukashii Ketsuron no Yō na Mono"			
"Mae shika Mukanee"	"Kimi no Uso o Shitteita"	Beauty Giraffes	

=== Albums ===
Album	Song	Member of
Kamikyokutachi	"Baby! Baby! Baby! Baby!"	
Kamikyokutachi	"Kimi to Niji to Taiyō to"	
Koko ni Ita Koto	"Boku nidekirukoto"	Team K
Koko ni Ita Koto	"Wagamama Collection"	
Koko ni Ita Koto	"Koko ni Ita Koto"	
1830m	"Iede no Yoru"	Team K
1830m	"Aozora yo: Sabishikunai ka?"	AKB48+SKE48+NMB48+HKT48
Tsugi no Ashiato	"Kakushin ga moteru mono"	Team A

=== Stage ===
Title	Song
Team B 1st Stage "Seishun Girls"	"Ame no Dōbutsuen"
Team B 2nd Stage "Aitakatta"	"Nageki no Figure"
Team B 2nd Stage "Aitakatta"	"Glass no I Love You"
Team B 2nd Stage "Aitakatta"	"Senaka kara Dakishimete"
Team B 2nd Stage "Aitakatta"	"Rio no Kakumei"
Team B 3rd Stage "Pajama Drive"	"Kagami no Naka no Jeanne d 'Arc"
Team K 4th Stage "Saishū Bell ga Naru"	"Gomen ne Jewel"
Team A 5th Stage "Renai Kinshi Jōrei"	"Squall no Ma ni"
Team A 5th Stage "Renai Kinshi Jōrei"	"Manatsu no Christmas Rose"
Team A 5th Stage "Renai Kinshi Jōrei"	"Tsundere!"
Team A 5th Stage "Renai Kinshi Jōrei"	"Kuroi Tenshi"
Team B 4th Stage "Idol no Yoake"	"Kataomoi no Taikakusen"
Team B 4th Stage "Idol no Yoake"	"Zannen Shōjo"
Team Research Students "Idol no Yoake"	"Zannen Shōjo"
Team K 5th Stage "Gyaku Agari"	"Dakishime raretara"
Theatre G-Rosso "Yume o Shina seru wake ni ikanai"	"Confession"
Team K 6th Stage "Reset"	"Ashita no tame ni Kiss o"
Team A 2nd Stage "Aitakatta"	"Glass no I Love You"

== Filmography ==
=== TV dramas ===
Year	Title	Role	Network
2010	Majisuka Gakuen	Majisuka Gakuen student	TV Tokyo
2011	Majisuka Gakuen 2	Comeback	TV Tokyo
2013	So long !		NTV

=== Variety ===
Year	Title	Network
2008	AKB 1-ji 59 fun!	NTV
2008	AKB 0-ji 59 fun!	NTV
2009	Shūkan AKB	TV Tokyo
2009	AKBingo!	NTV
2010	AKB48 Neshin TV	Family Gekijo
2010	Nekketsu Bo-So TV	CTV
2011	AKB to ××	YTV
2011	AKB48 Conte: Bimyō	Hikari TV Channel
2012	AKB48 no anta, Dare?	NotTV
2012	Bimyō na Tobira AKB48 no Gachichare	Hikari TV Channel
2013	Junji Inagawa no Kowai Hanashi: Honke Honmoto 7 Yoru Renzoku	NotTV

=== Anime television ===
Year	Title	Role	Network
2012	Crayon Shin-chan	Ayorin	TV Asahi

=== Films ===
Year	Title	Role
2009	Three Day Boys	
2010	X Game	Rika Meiji
2011	Mary-san no Denwa	Mayuko
2012	Shinobido	Uchimatsu
2014	Sukima Onna: Gekijō-ban	Koharu Tamo

=== Stage ===
Year	Title
2010	Arts Fusion in Kanagawa Drill Tamashī Yokohama Gachinko-hen

=== Radio ===
Year	Title	Network
2007	On 8 Hashira Night! with AKB48	Bay FM
2008	AKB48 Ashita made mō chotto.	NCB
2009	AKB48 Odaiba Fitain	Decks Tokyo Bay Studio
2011	AKB48 no All Night Nippon	NBS
2014	Listen –Live 4 Life–	NCB

=== Advertisements ===
Year	Title
2013	Will Selection "Disney Marie Collection"
2013	Tōkai Dō Hyō Kawa Mooncake

=== Video games ===
Year	Title	Role
2008	Moeru Mājan: Moejan!	Monkuki Honda
2010	AKB1/48 Idol to Koi shitara...	Herself
2011	AKB1/48 Idol to Guam de Koi shitara...	Herself
2012	AKB1/149 Ren'ai Sōsenkyo	Herself

=== Music videos ===
Year	Title
2014	Yunhak from Supernova "Kimi no subetewo Aishite ita yo"

== Bibliography ==
=== Magazine ===
Year	Title	Ref.
2014	Maquia	

=== Calendars ===
Year	Title
2011	Ayaka Kikuchi 2012-nen Calendar
2012	Takujō: Ayaka Kikuchi 2013-nen Calendar
2013	Takujō: Ayaka Kikuchi 2014-nen Calendar
