= Ayaka Kikuchi =

Ayaka Kikuchi may refer to:

- Ayaka Kikuchi (singer) (菊地 あやか, born 1993), Japanese singer, actress, model and idol
- Ayaka Kikuchi (speed skater) (菊池 彩花, born 1987), Japanese speed skater
