= Boku no Taiyō =

Single by AKB48

from the album Set List: Greatest Songs 2006–2007
- B-side: "Mirai no Kajitsu"
- Released: August 8, 2007
- Genre: Pop
- Length: 4:55
- Label: Defstar
- Songwriters: Yasushi Akimoto, Yoshimasa Inoue, Mio Okada
- Producer: Yasushi Akimoto

AKB48 singles chronology
"Bingo!" (2007)	"Boku no Taiyō" (2007)	"Yūhi o Miteiru ka?" (2007)

"Boku no Taiyō" (僕の太陽, My sun) is Japanese idol group AKB48's seventh single, and the fifth major single released through DefSTAR Records, on August 8, 2007.

== Promotion ==
"Boku no Taiyō" was also the title of a series of stage performances from July 1, 2007, by Himawari gumi (ひまわり組, Sunflower group), an inter-group unit, as well as the signature song within its performances. "Boku no Taiyō" was released only 3 weeks after "Bingo!"'s release, video clip was filmed by Masaki Takehisa, the same director who filmed Morning Musume.'s video clip. "Boku no Taiyō" was selected as the second opening theme song of anime adaptation of the series Deltora Quest, broadcast through TV Aichi and TXN, includes TV Tokyo.

The B-side song, "Mirai no Kajitsu" (未来の果実, Fruit of the future), was also used as the theme song for KBC Kyushu Asahi Broadcasting's "Mizu to Midori no Campaign 2007" (水と緑のキャンペーン2007, Water and Green Campaign 2007), and they performed at a live concert event in Fukuoka, as a part of KBC's events. Mirai no Kajitsu is sung by 16 members, includes all 14 Senbatsu members of "Boku no Taiyō" and Yuka Masuda and Ayaka Umeda from Team K.

Unlike previous singles, "Shokai Genteiban" (初回限定版, The first edition) CDs were not released, but each first press one also includes a sticker with one of characters of "Deltora Quest", as well as a CD jacket in different design, but did not come with a bonus DVD with a video clip of "Boku no Taiyō", which was included in the next single "Yūhi o Miteiru ka?.

Purchasers of the first press of the single were invited to an exclusive handshaking event to meet their favorite member. Each was given an amount of time proportional to the number of copies purchased, which led to some fans to buy the single in bulk.

== Reception ==
The single charted only four weeks in the top 200 with the highest rank at #6, tied with their then-highest record as "Bingo!", "Boku no Taiyō" sold 28,840 copies.

== Track listing ==
No.	Title	Writer(s)	Arranger	Length
1.	"Boku no Taiyō" (僕の太陽)	Yasushi Akimoto, Yoshimasa Inoue	Inoue	4:55
2.	"Mirai no Kajitsu"	Akimoto, Mio Okada	Tomoaki Takashima	4:54
3.	"Boku no Taiyō (Instrumental)"	Akimoto, Inoue	Ouchi	4:55
4.	"Mirai no Kajitsu (Instrumental)"	Akimoto, Okada	Takashima	4:54
Total length:				19:37

== Charts ==
Chart	Peak position
Boku no Taiyō
Oricon Weekly Chart	6

=== Reported sales ===
Chart	Amount
Oricon physical sales	29,000

== Personnel ==
The title track was sung with only 14 members, therefore, four members who sang on the previous single "Bingo!" were not chosen.

- Team A - Tomomi Itano, Haruna Kojima, Atsuko Maeda, Minami Minegishi, Rina Nakanishi, Mai Oshima, Mariko Shinoda, Minami Takahashi,
- Team K - Sayaka Akimoto, Tomomi Kasai, Sae Miyazawa, Erena Ono, Yuko Oshima
- Team B - Mayu Watanabe
