= 10nen Sakura =

- Regular Edition cover

Single by AKB48

from the album Kamikyokutachi
- B-side: "Sakurairo no Sora no Shita de"
- Released: March 4, 2009 (Japan)
- Genre: J-pop
- Label: You, Be Cool! / King
- Songwriters: Yasushi Akimoto, Yoshimasa Inoue
- Producer: Yasushi Akimoto

AKB48 singles chronology
| "Ōgoe Diamond" (2008) | "10nen Sakura" (2009) | "Namida Surprise!" (2009) |

Music video
- "10nen Zakura" on YouTube

"10nen Sakura" (10年桜, Jūnen Zakura; "10-year Cherry Blossom", "10th Graduation Anniversary") is the 11th major single by the Japanese idol group AKB48, released on March 4, 2009.

It's a school graduation song.

The single peaked at number 3 in the Oricon Weekly Singles Chart.

10 years after the song was released, as well as the same day, the other center and now graduate, Atsuko Maeda, gave birth to her son. Some of the fans joked that they had named the child Sakura/Zakura in commemoration of the anniversary.

== Track listing ==
The single was released in two versions: Regular Edition (通常盤) (CD+DVD, catalog number KIZM-25/6) and Theater Edition (劇場盤) (CD only, catalog number NMAX-1080).

=== Regular Edition ===
CD

| No. | Title | Writer(s) | Arranger | Length |
|---|---|---|---|---|
| 1. | "10nen Sakura" (10年桜) | Yasushi Akimoto, Yoshimasa Inoue | Yoshimasa Inoue |
| 2. | "Sakurairo no Sora no Shita de" (桜色の空の下で) | Yasushi Akimoto, Hiroshi Uesugi | Yūichi "Masa" Nonaka |
| 3. | "10nen Sakura (off vocal ver.)" | Akimoto, Inoue |
| 4. | "Sakurairo no Sora no Shita de (off vocal ver.)" | Akimoto, Uesugi |
| Total length: | | | | 19:11 |

DVD

| No. | Title | Length |
|---|---|---|
| 1. | "10nen Sakura (music video)" (10年桜 ビデオクリップ) |
| 2. | "Making of "10nen Sakura"" (Making of 「10年桜」) |
| 3. | "Bonus 1: "Kisu Shite" video" (特典映像1 永久保存版「キスして」映像) |
| 4. | "Bonus 2: SKE48 backstage hidden camera video" (特典映像2 SKE48楽屋盗撮映像) |

Bonus (First press limited edition only)

- Nationwide handshake meeting entry ticket (location of your choice)

=== Theater Edition ===
CD

See Regular Edition CD

Bonus

- Handshake meeting ticket
- Random photo of a member (Teams A, K, B, Kenkyūsei, SKE48)

== Members ==
(Team affiliation at the time of the release. The members featured on the cover of the Theater Edition are in bold.)

Centers: Atsuko Maeda and Jurina Matsui

- Team A: **Tomomi Itano**, **Mai Ōshima**, Rie Kitahara, **Haruna Kojima**, **Mariko Shinoda**, **Minami Takahashi**, Reina Fujie, **Atsuko Maeda**, Minami Minegishi, Miho Miyazaki
- Team K: **Yūko Ōshima**, **Erena Ono**, Tomomi Kasai, Asuka Kuramochi, Sae Miyazawa, **Sayaka Akimoto**
- Team B: Yuki Kashiwagi, Rino Sashihara, **Mayu Watanabe**
- SKE48: **Jurina Matsui**, Rena Matsui

== Charts ==
| Chart (2009) | Peak position |
|---|---|
| Japan (Oricon Weekly Singles Chart) | 3 |
| Japan Hot 100 (Billboard) | 13 |
| Japan (RIAJ Digital Track Chart) | didn't chart |
