= Seifuku ga Jama o Suru =

Single by AKB48

from the album Set List: Greatest Songs 2006–2007
- B-side: "Virgin Love"
- Released: January 31, 2007
- Genre: J-pop
- Length: 4:45:00
- Label: Defstar
- Songwriter(s): Yasushi Akimoto, Yoshimasa Inoue
- Producer(s): Yasushi Akimoto

AKB48 singles chronology
"Aitakatta" (2006)	"Seifuku ga Jama o Suru" (2007)	"Keibetsu Shiteita Aijō" (2007)

"Seifuku ga Jama o Suru" (制服が邪魔をする, (School) uniform is getting in the way) is Japanese idol group AKB48's fourth single, and the second major single released through DefSTAR Records, on January 31, 2007. The title track was sung with 14 members, 6 members fewer than their last single "Aitakatta".

== Music video ==
"Seifuku ga Jama o Suru" drew public attention with its controversial music video, which is a literal visualization of the lyrics, somewhat hinting at the subject of enjo kosai. Even the sales copy on TV commercial was "Otousan, gomennasai" (お父さん、ごめんなさい, Sorry, dad), a comment made by Maeda, who played a key role on its video clip. As its lyrics indicates, the video clip was filmed in Shibuya.

Each "Shokai Genteiban" (初回限定版, The first edition) CD also includes 2 DVDs, one is video clip and the other is "Making of "Seifuku ga Jama o Suru", as well as following premiums.

- Original Trading Cards (one of 3 different designs)
- A flyer for premium application
- CD sleeve in different design

There was a surprise live performance at two locations in Shibuya on the release date January 31, 2007.

== Reception ==
Since many "Aitakatta" limited editions remained unsold, the Seifuku ga Jama wo Suru limited sets were produced in a smaller quantity, making it one of the rarer to find releases. The single charted 5 weeks in the top 200 with the highest rank at #7, the highest ever record for AKB48. But "Seifuku ga Jama o Suru" wasn’t quite as well received as it only sold 21,989 copies.

== Track listing ==
No.	Title	Writer(s)	Length
1.	"Seifuku ga Jama o Suru" (制服が邪魔をする)	Yasushi Akimoto, Yoshimasa Inoue	4:45
2.	"Virgin Love"	Akimoto, Inoue	4:11
3.	"Seifuku ga Jama o Suru (Instrumental)"	Akimoto, Inoue	4:45
4.	"Virgin Love (Instrumental)"	Akimoto, Inoue	4:11
Total length:			17:57

== Charts ==
Chart (2007)	Peak position	Sales
Japan (Oricon Weekly Singles Chart)	7	22,000

== Personnel ==
The performers of the title track are as follows:

Center: Minami Takahashi, Atsuko Maeda

- Team A - Tomomi Itano, Haruna Kojima, Atsuko Maeda, Minami Minegishi, Rina Nakanishi, Mai Oshima, Mariko Shinoda, Minami Takahashi,
- Team K - Sayaka Akimoto, Tomomi Kasai, Yuka Masuda, Sae Miyazawa, Erena Ono, Yuko Oshima
