= Sakura no Shiori =

- Type A cover, featuring Atsuko Maeda.

Single by AKB48

from the album Kamikyokutachi
- B-side: "Choose Me!"; "Enkyori Poster"; "Majisuka Rock 'n Roll"
- Released: February 17, 2010
- Genre: J-pop, choir
- Length: 3:58
- Label: You, Be Cool! / King
- Songwriter(s): Yasushi Akimoto, Hiroshi Uesugi
- Producer(s): Kenichi Mitsuda

AKB48 singles chronology
| "River" (2009) | "Sakura no Shiori" (2010) | "Ponytail to Shushu" (2010) |

Music videos
- Sakura no Shiori on YouTube
- Majisuka Rock 'n' Roll on YouTube
- Enkyori Poster on YouTube
- Choose me! on YouTube

"Sakura no Shiori" (桜の栞, "Cherry Blossom Bookmark") is the 15th single by Japanese idol girl group AKB48; it was released on February 17, 2010. The title track is a school graduation song. The song was used as the theme song to the AKB48-related drama Majisuka Gakuen, which stars Atsuko Maeda and many members from AKB48 and its sister groups.

In its first week, the song sold 318,000 copies - the biggest opening sales for a female group single since Morning Musume's "Mr. Moonlight (Ai no Big Band)" in July 2001. The song has been certified platinum for physical sales by the RIAJ.

== Composition ==
The song is composed by Hiroshi Uesugi and written by Yasushi Akimoto. It is sung with AKB48 members singing together in a school choir. The song is a graduation song, with a theme of cherry blossoms.

== Tie-in ==
"Sakura no Shiori" was used not only as the theme song for the drama Majisuka Gakuen, but also in commercials for Aoki and Recochoku. The B-side "Majisuka Rock 'n Roll" was used as the opening theme song for the same drama.

== Track listing ==
All lyrics are written by Yasushi Akimoto

Type A track list
| No. | Title | Music | Arranger | Length |
|---|---|---|---|---|
| 1. | "Sakura no Shiori (桜の栞, Cherry Blossom Bookmark)" | Hiroshi Uesugi | Kenichi Mitsuda | 3:58 |
| 2. | "Majisuka Rock 'n Roll (マジスカロックンロール, Majisuka Rokkun Rōru)" | Candy&Megane | Yuichi "Masa" Nonaka | 3:37 |
| 3. | "Enkyori Poster (遠距離ポスター, Long Distance Poster)" (Team Play-Boy) | Kōta Ogawa | Nonaka | 3:18 |
| 4. | "Sakura no Shiori (Off Vocal Ver.)" | Uesugi | Mitsuda | 3:58 |
| 5. | "Majisuka Rock 'n Roll (Off Vocal Ver.)" | Candy&Megane | Nonaka | 3:37 |
| Total length: | | | | 18:42 |

All lyrics are written by Yasushi Akimoto

Type B track list
| No. | Title | Music | Arranger | Length |
|---|---|---|---|---|
| 1. | "Sakura no Shiori" | Uesugi | Mitsuda | 3:58 |
| 2. | "Majisuka Rock 'n Roll" | Candy&Megane | Nonaka | 3:37 |
| 3. | "Choose Me!" (Team Young Jump) | Yusuke Yamamoto | Yūichi Ichikawa | 4:04 |
| 4. | "Sakura no Shiori (Off Vocal Ver.)" | Uesugi | Mitsuda | 3:58 |
| 5. | "Majisuka Rock 'n Roll (Off Vocal Ver.)" | Candy&Megane | Nonaka | 3:37 |
| Total length: | | | | 19:27 |

All lyrics are written by Yasushi Akimoto

Theatre version track list
| No. | Title | Music | Arranger | Length |
|---|---|---|---|---|
| 1. | "Sakura no Shiori" | Uesugi | Mitsuda | 3:58 |
| 2. | "Majisuka Rock 'n Roll" | Candy&Megane | Nonaka | 3:37 |
| 3. | "Enkyori Poster" (Team Play-Boy) | Ogawa | Nonaka | 3:18 |
| 4. | "Choose Me!" (Team Young Jump) | Yamamoto | Ichikawa | 4:04 |
| Total length: | | | | 14:57 |

== Personnel ==
=== Sakura no Shiori ===
"Sakura no Shiori" was performed by the following members:

- Team A: Haruna Kojima, Mariko Shinoda, Minami Takahashi, Atsuko Maeda, Miho Miyazaki
- Team K: Tomomi Itano, Yuko Oshima, Sae Miyazawa
- Team B: Mayu Watanabe, Rie Kitahara, Yuki Kashiwagi
- SKE48: Jurina Matsui

The center for the track was Atsuko Maeda.

=== Majisuka Rock 'n Roll ===
The song centred on Atsuko Maeda.

- Team A: Haruna Kojima, Mariko Shinoda, Minami Takahashi, Atsuko Maeda.
- Team K: Tomomi Itano, Sayaka Akimoto, Erena Ono, Yuko Oshima
- Team B: Yuki Kashiwagi, Mayu Watanabe

=== Enkyori Poster ===
The unit of girls who sung this song performed under the name "Team Play-Boy." The song centred on Yuki Kashiwagi.

- Team A: Aki Takajō, Aika Ōta, Ami Maeda
- Team K: Sae Miyazawa, Moeno Nito
- Team B: Yuki Kashiwagi, Miho Miyazaki

=== Choose Me! ===
The unit of girls who sung this song performed under the name "Team Young Jump." The song centred on Rie Kitahara.

- Team A: Haruka Nakagawa, Rino Sashihara, Asuka Kuramochi
- Team K: Minami Minegishi, Ayaka Kikuchi
- Team B: Tomomi Kasai, Rie Kitahara

== Chart rankings ==
| Chart | Peak position |
|---|---|
| Billboard Adult Contemporary Airplay | 13 |
| Billboard Japan Hot 100 | 1 |
| Billboard yearly Japan Hot 100 | 43 |
| Oricon weekly singles | 1 |
| Oricon yearly singles | 12 |
| RIAJ Digital Track Chart weekly top 100 | 15 |
| RIAJ Digital Track Chart yearly top 100 | 96 |

=== Reported sales ===
| Chart | Amount |
|---|---|
| Oricon physical sales | 398,000 |
