= Bingo! (AKB48 song) =

Single by AKB48

from the album Set List: Greatest Songs 2006–2007
- B-side: "Only Today"
- Released: July 18, 2007
- Genre: Pop
- Length: 4:09
- Label: Defstar
- Songwriters: Yasushi Akimoto, Hideki Naruse, Tetsuya Ouchi
- Producer: Yasushi Akimoto

AKB48 singles chronology
"Keibetsu Shiteita Aijō" (2007)	"Bingo!" (2007)	"Boku no Taiyō" (2007)

Bingo! (stylised as BINGO!) is Japanese idol group AKB48's sixth single, and the fourth major single released through DefSTAR Records, on July 18, 2007.

== Promotion ==
The music video was filmed by the same director filmed "Seifuku ga Jama o Suru", although the theme is totally different. All 46 members of AKB48 participated in the video clip, filmed in Onjuku, Chiba and Makuhari Messe.

Each "Shokai Genteiban" (初回限定版, The first edition) CD also includes 2 DVDs, one is video clip and the other is "Making of "Bingo!".

Sony Music offered high resolution closeup portraits of the 18 Senbatsu members as wallpaper downloads on their website for the limited duration of 36 hours after the song's release.

== Reception ==
The single charted 5 weeks in the top 200 with the highest rank at #6, then-highest ever record for AKB48. "Bingo!" sold 25,611 copies.

== Track listing ==
No.	Title	Writer(s)	Arranger	Length
1.	"Bingo!"	Yasushi Akimoto, Hideki Naruse,	Tetsuya Ouchi	4:09
2.	"Only Today"	Akimoto, Ouchi	Ouchi	4:17
3.	"Bingo! (Instrumental)"	Akimoto, Naruse	Ouchi	4:09
4.	"Only Today (Instrumental)"	Akimoto, Ouchi	Ouchi	4:17
Total length:				17:00

== Charts ==
Chart	Peak position
Bingo!
Oricon Weekly Chart	6

=== Reported sales ===
Chart	Amount
Oricon physical sales	26,000

== Personnel ==
Center: Minami Takahashi, Atsuko Maeda

The title track was sung by 18 members, including 3 members chosen from Team B. It was also the debut for then-youngest member Manami Oku.

- Team A - Tomomi Itano, Haruna Kojima, Atsuko Maeda, Minami Minegishi, Rina Nakanishi, Mai Oshima, Mariko Shinoda, Minami Takahashi,
- Team K - Sayaka Akimoto, Tomomi Kasai, Yuka Masuda, Sae Miyazawa, Manami Oku, Erena Ono, Yuko Oshima
- Team B - Natsumi Hirajima, Yuki Kashiwagi, Mayu Watanabe
