= Iiwake Maybe =

- Regular Edition cover

Single by AKB48

from the album Kamikyokutachi
- B-side: "Tobenai Agehachō"
- Released: August 26, 2009 (Japan)
- Genre: J-pop
- Length: 4:09
- Label: You, Be Cool! / King
- Songwriters: Yasushi Akimoto, Shunryū
- Producer: Yasushi Akimoto

AKB48 singles chronology
"Namida Surprise!" (2009)	"Iiwake Maybe" (2009)	"River" (2009)

Music videos
- Iiwake Maybe on YouTube
- Tobenai Agehachō on YouTube

"Iiwake Maybe" (言い訳Maybe; "An Excuse, Maybe") is the 13th major single by the Japanese idol group AKB48, released on August 26, 2009. It was the first AKB48's single which participating members were chosen by election. The single surprisingly outsold SMAP on its first day, taking the 1st place in the daily chart, but eventually placed 2nd in the Oricon Weekly Singles Chart. Their sister groups JKT48, MNL48, AKB48 Team SH, BNK48, and KLP48 made their own version.

== Track listing ==
The single was released in two versions: Regular Edition (通常盤) (CD+DVD, catalog number KIZM-37/8) and Theater Edition (劇場盤) (CD only, catalog number NMAX-1086).

=== Regular Edition ===
CD

No.	Title	Writer(s)	Length
1.	"Iiwake Maybe" (言い訳Maybe)	Yasushi Akimoto, Shunryū	4:09
2.	"Tobenai Agehachō" (飛べないアゲハチョウ)	Yasushi Akimoto, Yoshimasa Inoue	3:41
3.	"Iiwake Maybe (off vocal ver.)"	Akimoto, Shunryū
4.	"Tobenai Agehachō (off vocal ver.)"	Akimoto, Inoue
Total length:			15:49

DVD

No.	Title	Length
1.	"Iiwake Maybe (music video)" (「言い訳Maybe」ビデオクリップ)
2.	"Tobenai Agehachō (music video)" (「飛べないアゲハチョウ」ビデオクリップ)
3.	"AKB48 General Election documentary" (AKB48総選挙ドキュメント)

Bonus (First press limited edition only)

- Handshake event ticket

=== Theater Edition ===
CD

See Regular Edition CD

== Members ==
Participating members were chosen by election. Top 21 members sang the A-side "Iiwake Maybe". Those, who were voted 22nd to 30th, sang the B-side "Tobenai Agehachō" under the name of Under Girls.

=== "Iiwake Maybe" ===
1. Atsuko Maeda (Team A) (4630 votes)
2. Yūko Ōshima (Team K) (3345)
3. Mariko Shinoda (Team A) (2852)
4. Mayu Watanabe (Team B) (2625)
5. Minami Takahashi (Team A) (2614)
6. Haruna Kojima (Team A) (2543)
7. Tomomi Itano (Team A) (2281)
8. Amina Satō (Team A) (2117)
9. Yuki Kashiwagi (Team B) (1920)
10. Tomomi Kasai (Team K) (1890)
11. Erena Ono (Team K) (1838)
12. Sayaka Akimoto (Team K) (1599)
13. Rie Kitahara (Team A) (1578)
14. Sae Miyazawa (Team K) (1547)
15. Yukari Satō (Team A) (1539)
16. Minami Minegishi (Team A) (1414)
17. Kazumi Urano (Team B) (1395)
18. Miho Miyazaki (Team A) (1373)
19. Jurina Matsui (SKE48) (1371)
20. Aika Ōta (Team B) (1365)
21. Asuka Kuramochi (Team K) (1355)

=== "Tobenai Agehachō" ===
Under Girls

22. Rumi Yonezawa (Team B) (1352)
23. Aki Takajō (Team A) (1322)
24. Megumi Ohori (Team K) (1316)
25. Yuka Masuda (Team K) (1247)
26. Natsumi Hirajima (Team B) (1216)
27. Rino Sashihara (Team B) (1170)
28. Haruka Katayama (Team B) (1089)
29. Rena Matsui (SKE48) (1073)
30. Natsumi Matsubara (Team K) (1050)

== Charts ==
Chart (2009)	Peak position
Japan (Oricon Weekly Singles Chart)	2
Japan Hot 100 (Billboard)	2
Japan (RIAJ Digital Track Chart)	11

=== Sales and certifications ===
Chart	Amount
Oricon physical sales	145,776
RIAJ full-length cellphone downloads	Platinum (250,000+)
