= Kamikyokutachi =

- Regular Edition cover

Compilation album by AKB48
- Released: April 7, 2010 (Japan)
- Genre: J-pop, pop
- Length: 65:23
- Label: You, Be Cool! / King
- Producer: Yasushi Akimoto

AKB48 chronology
Set List: Greatest Songs 2006–2007 (2008)	Kamikyokutachi (2010)	Set List: Greatest Songs Kanzenban (2010)

Singles from Kamikyokutachi
- 1. "Ōgoe Diamond" Released: October 22, 2008; 2. "Jūnen Zakura" Released: March 4, 2009; 3. "Namida Surprise!" Released: June 24, 2009; 4. "Iiwake Maybe" Released: August 26, 2009; 5. "RIVER" Released: October 21, 2009; 6. "Sakura no Shiori" Released: February 17, 2010

Alternative cover
- Theater Edition cover featuring Atsuko Maeda

Kamikyokutachi (神曲たち; "Masterpieces") is the second compilation album by the Japanese idol group AKB48. It was released in Japan on April 7, 2010, and contains 16 songs, 14 of which had been previously released as singles. The album topped the weekly Oricon Albums Chart.

== Release ==
The regular edition was released by King Records as a CD+DVD. The CD features 16 music tracks and the DVD has four video clips, three of which are choreography videos. In Japan, the album came with a photo of one of the 12 cover girls. (Note: The overseas Asian edition did not feature the separate bonus photo.)

A theater edition was also released by King Records. It consists of 14 of the 16 music tracks. Instead of the DVD, there is a bonus CD with an audio commentary by the group on the 14 songs. It is packaged with an autograph signing ticket event held at Makuhari Messe International Exhibition Hall.

== Track listing ==
All songs performed by the AKB48 title track singers except as listed below.

All lyrics are written by Yasushi Akimoto (Note: Akimoto lyrics credit shown on each track according to album insert.)

CD (KIZC-65/6)
No.	Title	Writer(s)	Performance	Length
1.	"River"	Yoshimasa Inoue		4:43
2.	"Baby! Baby! Baby! Baby!"	Hiroshi Uesugi		4:01
3.	"Ōgoe Diamond" (大声ダイヤモンド)	Inoue		4:08
4.	"Kimi no Koto ga Suki Dakara" (君のことが好きだから)	Tetsuro Oda	Undergirls	4:09
5.	"Shonichi" (初日)	Mio Okada	AKB48 Team B	3:50
6.	"10nen Sakura" (10年桜)	Inoue		4:15
7.	"Tobenai Agehachō" (飛べないアゲハチョウ)	CandzZy&Megane, Inoue	Undergirls	3:42
8.	"Namida Surprise!" (涙サプライズ!)	Inoue		4:42
9.	"Choose me!"	Yusuke Yamamoto	Team YJ (Team Young Jump)	4:02
10.	"Enkyori Poster" (遠距離ポスター)	Kota Ogawa	Team PB (Team Play-Boy)	3:18
11.	"Iiwake Maybe" (言い訳Maybe)	Shun Ryu		4:10
12.	"Hikōkigumo" (ひこうき雲)	Hideki Naruse	Theater Girls	4:01
13.	"Majisuka Rock 'n Roll" (マジスカロックンロール)	CandzZy&Megane		3:41
14.	"Sakura no Shiori" (桜の栞)	Hiroshi Uesugi		4:01
15.	"Jibun Rashisa (Note: This song was not included on the Theater edition of the album.)" (自分らしさ)	Motoi Okuda	Erena Ono, Sumire Satō, Mayu Watanabe	5:02
16.	"Kimi to Niji to Taiyō to" (君と虹と太陽と)	Shun Ryu		3:38

DVD
No.	Title	Length
1.	"Ōgoe Diamond (choreography video)" (大声ダイヤモンド 振り付けビデオ)
2.	"Iiwake Maybe (choreography video)" (言い訳Maybe 振り付けビデオ)
3.	"River (choreography video)" (River 振り付けビデオ)

== Charts ==
Chart	Peak position
JPN Weekly Albums Chart	1
Taiwan Five Music J/K-pop Chart	4

=== Sales and certifications ===
Chart	Amount
Oricon sales	562,000
RIAJ physical shipping certification	Double Platinum

== Release history ==
Region	Date	Format	Label
Japan	April 7, 2010	CD; digital download; streaming	King Records (YOU BE COOL division)
Various parts of Asia	April 7, 2010	CD; digital download; streaming	King Records
South Korea	August 10, 2018	digital download; streaming	Stone Music Entertainment; Genie Music; King
