= Suiensā =

- すイエんサー
- Genre: Variety show
- Starring: See below
- Country of origin: Japan
- Original language: Japanese

Production
- Production location: Tokyo

Original release
- Network: NHK
- Release: March 31, 2009 – March 27, 2023

Suiensaa (すイエんサー) is a scientific variety show broadcast in Japan by NHK Educational TV.

== Presenters ==
- Yu Shinagawa
- Tomoharu Shōji
- Mai Oshima
