= Keibetsu Shiteita Aijō =

Single by AKB48

from the album Set List: Greatest Songs 2006–2007
- B-side: "Namida Uri no Shōjo"
- Released: April 18, 2007
- Genre: J-Pop
- Length: 4:18:00
- Label: Defstar
- Songwriter(s): Yasushi Akimoto, Yoshimasa Inoue
- Producer(s): Yasushi Akimoto

AKB48 singles chronology
"Seifuku ga Jama o Suru" (2007)	"Keibetsu Shiteita Aijō" (2007)	"Bingo!" (2007)

"Keibetsu Shiteita Aijō" (軽蔑していた愛情; "Scorned Love") is Japanese idol group AKB48's fifth single, and the third major single released through DefSTAR Records, on April 18, 2007. The title track was sung with 16 members, 14 of whom appeared on the previous single, "Seifuku ga Jama o Suru".

== Promotion ==
The theme of "Keibetsu Shiteita Aijō" is school bullying, which results in suicide by jumping off the school roof. The music video, which is directed by Eiki Takahashi and launched on the SMEJ-owned Music On! TV, starts with following subtitle;

"You are not a bird. I'd like you to walk on the earth with your feet. If you have a hardship, you have a future beyond. Time can serve as an eraser of your memory" (君は鳥じゃない。大地に足をつけて歩いて欲しい。つらいことがあっても、その先には未来がある。時はいつだって、記憶の消しゴムだから。)

The video clip has flash insertion of insidious email messages like "Do you think that anyone who likes you even exists in this world?" (あんたの事好きな人間がこの世にいると思ってんの?), "Everyone hates you" (みんなあんたの事嫌いだから), "Don't come to school The school will be polluted if you just come!! Air also!! Do not let us breathe the same air" (学校来るな あんたが来るだけで学校がけがれる!! 空気もけがれる!! 同じ空気吸わせるな), "You are creepy, annoying, die already?" (お前マジきもい ウザい 一回死んでくれない?).

The sales copy on TV commercial was "Minnano koto ga kirai deshita" (みんなの事が、嫌いでした, (I) hated everyone), a comment made by Tomomi Kasai, although Yuko Oshima was the one who played a key role on its video clip.

Even the background design of CD jacket was like a newspaper article reporting suicide caused by school bullying.

Each "Shokai Genteiban" (初回限定版, The first edition) CD also includes 2 DVDs, one is video clip and the other is "Making of "Keibetsu Shiteita Aijō", as well as following premiums.

- Original Trading Cards (one of 3 different designs)
- A flyer for premium lucky draw application

== Reception ==
The single charted 4 weeks in the top 200 with the highest rank at #8, a week and a rank less than their previous single, "Seifuku ga Jama o Suru". "Keibetsu Shiteita Aijō" sold 22,671 copies.

== Personnel ==
Center: Minami Takahashi

- Team A - Tomomi Itano, Haruna Kojima, Atsuko Maeda, Minami Minegishi, Rina Nakanishi, Mai Oshima, Mariko Shinoda, Minami Takahashi,
- Team K - Sayaka Akimoto, Tomomi Kasai, Kana Kobayashi, Yuka Masuda, Sae Miyazawa, Erena Ono, Yuko Oshima, Natsuki Sato

== Track listing ==
No.	Title	Writer(s)	Length
1.	"Keibetsu Shiteita Aijō" (軽蔑していた愛情)	Yasushi Akimoto, Yoshimasa Inoue	4:18
2.	"Namida Uri no Shōjo"	Akimoto, Inoue	4:38
3.	"Keibetsu Shiteita Aijō (Instrumental)"	Akimoto, Inoue	4:18
4.	"Namida Uri no Shōjo (Instrumental)"	Akimoto, Inoue	4:38
Total length:			17:53

== Charts ==
Chart	Peak position
Seifuku ga Jama o Suru
Oricon Weekly Chart	8

=== Reported sales ===
Chart	Amount
Oricon physical sales	23,000
