= Erena Ono =

Japanese singer (born 1993)

Erena Ono 小野 恵令奈
- Born: November 26, 1993 (age 32); Tokyo, Japan
- Genres: J-pop
- Years active: 2006–2014
- Labels: DefSTAR, Warner Music Japan
- Formerly of: AKB48

Erena Ono (小野 恵令奈, Ono Erena; born November 26, 1993), is a former member of the Japanese idol girl group AKB48. She was in "Team K" and her talent agency was Ohta Production. She was also part of AKB48 subgroups "Honegumi from AKB48", "AKBIdoling !! " and "ICE from AKB48".

== Career ==
Ono was born in Tokyo. AKB48 released "Aitakatta" on DefStar Records. For this song, 20 members were selected from the 36 members in TeamA & TeamK; Ono was among those selected.

Erena was also one of the focal members of Team K, taking part in most group activities. During AKB48's concert at the Yoyogi National Gymnasium in July 2010, it was announced that Team K member Erena Ono would be graduating from AKB48 to study acting abroad. Erena graduated from AKB48 on September 27, 2010 in a Team K theater performance. Her blog was closed soon after, on 4 November. She opened a new blog again on July 27, 2011 and in early October 2011, it closed again. In October 2011, she opened a new blog. Ono said that she was going to study in London, but then decided to change her mind and stay in Tokyo. She stated that the reason was because she could not live outside the entertainment world. Now, she is working under LesPros Entertainment and training hard to become an actress.

In 2012, it was announced that Ono would have her solo debut with her debut single, "Erepyon". In 2013, it was announced that she would release her first album, titled "Erena". She's the first AKB graduated member to release an original album.

She appeared in the 58th Annual Kohaku Utagassen. She appeared at the 2013 Tokyo Idol Festival.

Ono won New Artist award from Japan Record Award and became nominee for Best New Artist. But she lost to Leo Ieiri.

On July 7, 2014, she announced her retirement on her blog, and her contract with LesPros Entertainment expired on July 15, 2014.

== Discography ==
=== Studio albums ===
Erena (2013)

=== Solo singles ===
- 2012-06-13 "Erepyon" (えれぴょん) – Sales: 32,938
- 2012-10-03 "Erenyan" (えれにゃん) – Sales: 13,519
- 2012-12-26 "Say !! Ippai" (Say !! いっぱい) – Sales: 7,706
- 2013-03-06 "Kimi ga Anohi Waratteita Imi wo" (君があの日笑っていた意味を) – Sales: 5,964
- 2013-05-29 "Fighting☆Hero" (ファイティング☆ヒーロー) – Sales: 5,967

=== Singles with AKB48 ===
- "Aitakatta"
- "Seifuku ga Jama o Suru"
- "Keibetsu Shiteita Aijō"
- "Bingo!"
- "Boku no Taiyō"
- "Yūhi o Miteiru ka?"
- "Romance, Irane"
- "Sakura no Hanabiratachi 2008"
- "Baby! Baby! Baby!" (Digital Single)
- "Ōgoe Diamond"
- "10nen Zakura"
  - "Sakurairo no Sora no Shita de"
- "Namida Surprise!"
- "Iiwake Maybe"
- "River"
- "Sakura no Shiori"
  - "Majisuka Rock 'n' Roll"
- "Ponytail to Chouchou"
  - "Majijo Teppen Blues"
- "Heavy Rotation"
  - "Yasai Sisters"

== Stage Units ==
Team K 1st Stage Party ga Hajimaru yo (PARTYが始まるよ)

- "Classmate" (クラスメイト)

Team K 2nd Stage Seishun Girls (青春ガールズ)

- "Ame no Doubutsuen" (雨の動物園)

Team K 3rd Stage Nōnai Paradise (脳内パラダイス)

- "Honehone Waltz" (ほねほねワルツ)

Himawarigumi 1st Stage Boku no Taiyō (僕の太陽)

- "Idol nante Yobanaide" (アイドルなんて呼ばないで)

Himawarigumi 2nd Stage Yume o Shinaseru Wake ni Ikanai (夢を死なせるわけにいかない)

- "Tonari no Banana" (となりのバナナ)

Team K 4th Stage Saishū Bell ga Naru (最終ベルが鳴る)

- "Hatsukoi Dorobou" (初恋泥棒)

Team K 5th Stage Sakaagari (逆上がり)

- "Wagamama na Nagareboshi" (わがままな流れ星)

Team K 6th Stage Reset

- "Seifuku Resistance" (制服レジスタンス)

== Filmography ==
=== Dramas ===
- Cat's Street (2008)
- Majisuka Gakuen (2010) as Erena
- Tank Top Fighter (2013) as Kai

=== Movies ===
- Densen Uta (「伝染歌」) (2007)
- Higurashi no Naku Koro ni (「ひぐらしのなく頃に」) (2008) as Satoko Hōjō (北条沙都子)
- Sankaku (さんかく) (2010)
- The Snow White Murder Case (2014)

=== Anime ===
- ICE (anime) (2007) as Yuki (voice only)

== Awards ==
=== Japan Record Awards ===
The Japan Record Awards is a major music awards show held annually in Japan by the Japan Composer's Association.

Year	Nominee / work	Award	Result
2012	Erena Ono	New Artist Award	Won
2012	Erena Ono	Best New Artist Award	Nominated
