= Namida Surprise! =

- Regular Edition cover

Single by AKB48

from the album Kamikyokutachi
- B-side: "Shonichi"; "First Love" / Erena Ono
- Released: June 24, 2009 (Japan)
- Genre: J-pop
- Label: You, Be Cool! / King
- Songwriters: Yasushi Akimoto, Yoshimasa Inoue
- Producer: Yasushi Akimoto

AKB48 singles chronology
"10nen Sakura" (2009)	"Namida Surprise!" (2009)	"Iiwake Maybe" (2009)

Music video
- AKB48 "Namida Surprise!" on YouTube

"Namida Surprise!" (涙サプライズ!, Namida Sapuraizu!) is the 12th major single by the Japanese idol group AKB48, released on June 24, 2009. The single peaked at number 2 in the Oricon weekly singles chart.

It is a Birthday song.

== Track listing ==
The single was released in two versions: Regular Edition (通常盤) (CD+DVD, catalog number KIZM-33/4) and Theater Edition (劇場盤) (CD only, catalog number NMAX-1081). The first press of the Regular Edition came with a voting card for the AKB48 election, selecting the members who would participate in the next single, and a handshake event ticket.

=== Regular Edition ===
CD

No.	Title	Writer(s)	Arranger	Length
1.	"Namida Surprise!" (涙サプライズ!)	Yasushi Akimoto, Yoshimasa Inoue	Yoshimasa Inoue
2.	"Shonichi / Team B" (初日 / teamB)	Yasushi Akimoto, Mio Okada	Yūichi Ichikawa
3.	"First Love / Erena Ono" (First Love / 小野恵令奈)	Yasushi Akimoto, Akira Umehara	Yūichi "Masa" Nonaka
4.	"Namida Surprise! (off vocal ver.)"	Akimoto, Inoue
Total length:				19:11

DVD

No.	Title	Length
1.	"Namida Surprise! (music video)" (「涙サプライズ!」ビデオクリップ)
2.	"Making of" (メイキング映像)
3.	"Bonus" (特典映像)

Bonus (First press only)

- AKB48 election voting card with a serial number
- Handshake event ticket (Sapporo, Fukuoka, Nagoya, Osaka, Tokyo)

=== Theater Edition ===
CD

See Regular Edition CD

== Members ==
(Team affiliation at the time of the release.)

Center: Atsuko Maeda

- Team A: Tomomi Itano, Rie Kitahara, Haruna Kojima, Mariko Shinoda, Minami Takahashi, Reina Fujie, Atsuko Maeda, Minami Minegishi, Miho Miyazaki
- Team K: Yūko Ōshima, Erena Ono, Tomomi Kasai, Sae Miyazawa
- Team B: Yuki Kashiwagi, Rino Sashihara, Moeno Nitō, Mayu Watanabe
- Kenkyūsei: Mika Komori
- SKE48: Jurina Matsui, Rena Matsui

It was the first selection for Moeno Nitō. Mika Komori became the first trainee to be selected for an A-side.

== Charts ==
Chart (2009)	Peak position
Japan (Oricon Weekly Singles Chart)	2
Japan Hot 100 (Billboard)	5
Japan (RIAJ Digital Track Chart)	28

== Sales and certifications ==
- Total Sales in 2009: 145,503

- Total Sales in 2010: 17,133

- Total Sales in 2011: 6,190*

- Total Reported Sales: 168,826*

== Achievements ==
- The fifth best-selling single of July 2009.
- The 39th best-selling single of 2009.
- First AKB48 single to rank second in both the Weekly and Daily Categories of the Oricon Charts.
- First AKB48 Single to sell over 100,000 copies in its first week.
- Following the trend set by 10nen Zakura, this single outsold all the previous AKB48 singles only in its first week.
- The 8th Music Video to reach 20,000,000 views on YouTube.

== Other versions ==
- The Thai idol group BNK48, a sister group of AKB48, covered the song and named it "Prakai Namta Lae Roiyim" (Thai: ประกายน้ำตาและรอยยิ้ม; IPA: [prà.ka:j ná:m.ta: lɛ́ʔ rɔ:j.jím]; "Sparkle of Tears and Smiles"). It was included on the group's third single, "Shonichi – Wan Raek", released on 7 May 2018.
- The Vietnamese sister idol group SGO48 performed the song in Vietnamese at the AKB48 Group Asia Festival in Shanghai on August 24, 2019.
