= Skirt, Hirari =

Single by AKB48

from the album Set List: Greatest Songs 2006–2007 & 0 to 1 no Aida
- B-side: "Aozora no Soba ni Ite" (青空のそばにいて)
- Released: June 7, 2006 (Indies)
- Genre: J-pop; Funk
- Length: 4:02
- Label: AKS, Avex Distribution
- Songwriters: Yasushi Akimoto, Mio Okada, Yuichi Yaegaki
- Producer: Yasushi Akimoto

AKB48 singles chronology
"Sakura no Hanabiratachi" (2006)	"Skirt, Hirari" (2006)	"Aitakatta" (2006)

"Skirt, Hirari" (スカート、ひらり, Sukāto, Hirari) is Japanese idol group AKB48's second single, released independently through AKS on June 7, 2006. The song was sung by 7 members of AKB48 Team A, Tomomi Itano, Haruna Kojima, Atsuko Maeda, Rina Nakanishi, Risa Narita, Mai Oshima, and Minami Takahashi, and other members of Team A were back dancers. The center of the song is Minami Takahashi and Atsuko Maeda.

== Promotion ==
Launching of "Skirt, Hirari" was held at the off-theater live promoting event at Akihabara UDX with some 1,500 attendees on June 4, 2006, 3 days prior the release date. During this event, all AKB48 members, 20 members of Team A and 17 members of Team K, performed on the stage together first time, although "Skirt, Hirari" itself was recorded with Team A members only.

They made their first appearances on TV music programs to perform as a group of singers, such as "Music Station", "Music Fighter", etc. on June 9, two days after the release of CD.

The song was used as the theme song of the "Odaiba Gakuen 2006 (Bunkasai)" (お台場学園2006〜文化祭〜, Odaiba School 2006 (School Festival)), series of summer event held by Fuji Television. The B-side "Aozora no soba ni ite" was used as the ending theme song for the variety show Mitake Uranai.

Each "Shokai Genteiban" (初回限定版, The first edition) CD included a postcard, which was for a lucky draw with following awards.

- Award A - Participation right for "AKB48 member to iku Hanayashiki Tour (AKB48メンバーと行く「花やしき」ツアー, Tour to Hanayashiki Theme Park with AKB48 members)
- Award K - Participation right for watching a rehearsal of "3rd Stage" with AKB48 staffs
- Award B - AKB48 Team A "1st stage" DVD
- Sticker with all AKB48 members
- Sticker with self-portrait of members (1 out of 20 members)

'Because of some chance mischief, I happened to pass you My heart nearly stopped And I purposely pretended to ignore you as I walked by How stupid am I? When I like you so much I fall into a pit of self-hate Alone in the crowd at the station'

== Reception ==
The single charted 6 weeks in the top 200 with the highest rank at #13, but sold 20,609 copies, which was about a half of their debut single, "Sakura no Hanabiratachi".

== Track listing ==
No.	Title	Writer(s)	Arranger	Length
1.	"Skirt, Hirari" (スカート、ひらり)	Yasushi Akimoto, Mio Okada	Atsushi Umebori	4:02
2.	"Aozora no soba ni ite"	Akimoto, Yuichi Yaegashi	Ichinen Yamazaki	5:08
3.	"Skirt, Hirari (Karaoke Version)"	Akimoto, Okada	Umebori	4:02
4.	"Aozora no soba ni ite(Karaoke Version)"	Akimoto, Yaegashi	Yamazaki	5:08
Total length:				18:19

== Charts ==
Chart	Peak position
Skirt, Hirari
Oricon Weekly Chart	13

=== Reported sales ===
Chart	Amount
Oricon physical sales	20,000

== Other versions ==
- The Thai idol group BNK48, an international sister group of AKB48, covered the song and named it "Phlio" (Thai: พลิ้ว; IPA: [pʰlíw]; "Fluttering"). It was released as a B-side track of the group's second single, "Koi Suru Fortune Cookie – Cookie Siangthai", in 2017.
- The Filipino idol group MNL48, an international sister group of AKB48, covered the song with the tagalized title "Umiindak Na Saya". It was released as a B-side track for the group’s debut single “Aitakatta-Gustong Makita”, in 2018.
- JKT48 also have an indonesian version of the song named "Rok Bergoyang".
