= Family Gekijo =

- Country: Japan
- Broadcast area: Nationwide
- Headquarters: Akasaka, Minato, Tokyo, Japan

Programming
- Language: Japanese
- Picture format: HDTV 1080i

Ownership
- Owner: Family Gekijo Company, Limited

History
- Launched: January 1, 1996

Links
- Website: www.fami-geki.com

Family Gekijo (ファミリー劇場, Famirī Gekijō; "Family Theatre") is a Japanese cable television station which was founded during Japan's cable TV boom of late 1990s. It carries mostly domestic TV programs and has several popular anime titles on its program list. The channel is owned by a number of investors, including Tohokushinsha Film Corporation.

Distributed by Sky PerfecTV and Dish Network (since April 2, 2018). Its channel number on Sky PerfecTV is currently 73.
