= Sakura no Hanabiratachi =

Single by AKB48

Single by AKB48

from the album Set List: Greatest Songs 2006–2007 and 0 to 1 no Aida
- B-side: "Dear My Teacher"
- Released: February 1, 2006
- Genre: J-pop
- Length: 5:24
- Label: AKS, Avex Distribution
- Songwriters: Yasushi Akimoto, Hiroshi Uesugi
- Producers: Nobuhiko Kashiwara, Yasushi Kubota, Kotaro Shiba

AKB48 singles chronology
"Sakura no Hanabiratachi" (2006)	"Skirt, Hirari" (2006)

"Sakura no Hanabiratachi" (桜の花びらたち, Cherry Blossom Petals) is Japanese idol group AKB48's debut single, released independently through AKS on February 1, 2006. The single was the highest debuting girl group single since Morning Musume's "Morning Coffee", released in 1998. The song was composed by Hiroshi Uesugi and written by Yasushi Akimoto. The song was re-recorded and released again in 2008 as the group's final single with major label DefStar Records. The song was sung by the original 21 members of AKB48 that later formed Team A. The center of the 2006 version was Minami Takahashi. while the center of the 2008 version was Atsuko Maeda. and the center of the 2025 version is Yui Oguri.

== Promotion ==
The launching of "Sakura no Hanabiratachi" was held on February 1, 2006, at the AKB48 theater. During this event, a video presentation of the events that occurred during the formation of Team A was shown. 20 Members of AKB48 Team A then performed "Sakura no Hanabiratachi" and "Dear My Teacher," and later introduced themselves one by one to the public. Notable during this event was the absence of Tomomi Ōe due to school activities.

The song was used as the theme song of the TBS drama Desu yo Nee., along with being used in videophone commercials for NTT docomo. The B-side "Dear My Teacher" was used as the ending theme song for the variety show Mitake Uranai.

The re-released version had several tie-ups. The lead track was used as an ending theme song for the variety show Arabiki-dan, while the B-side "Saigo no Seifuku" was used as an image song for the 26th Yokohama International Women's Ekiden.

== 2008 version ==
"Sakura no Hanabiratachi 2008"
- Sakura no Hanabiratachi 2008

Single by AKB48

from the album Set List: Greatest Songs Kanzenban & 0 to 1 no Aida
- B-side: "Saigo no Seifuku"
- Released: February 27, 2008
- Genre: J-Pop
- Length: 5:20
- Label: DefStar
- Songwriters: Yasushi Akimoto, Hiroshi Uesugi
- Producers: Nobuhiko Kashiwara, Yasushi Kubota, Kotaro Shiba

AKB48 singles chronology
"Romance, Irane" (2008)	"Sakura no Hanabiratachi 2008" (2008)	"Baby! Baby! Baby!" (2008)

The Team K and Team B members were invited to join in creating a new 2008 version of the song, "Sakura no Habiratachi 2008" (桜の花びらたち2008). A poster was given for a purchase of any version of this single at the AKB48 Theater Café. Since only one member from AKB48 was featured on each poster, 44 different types of posters were available. These posters were handed out randomly to any purchaser. Anyone who had collected all 44 types had been invited to a Spring Festival with AKB48. DefSTAR Records later announced, however, that this offer would be cancelled, due to the apparent scandal of attracting purchasers to effectively buy a special reward by spending an inordinate amount of money chasing down all 44 versions of the poster.

A special B-side is featured on the type B limited edition, where the song is rearranged into the form of a school choir performance.

== 2010 version ==
"Sakura no Hanabiratachi HaruUta 2010 Special" (桜の花びらたち 春うた2010スペシャル), with special lyrics written by Yasushi Akimoto applied at the very last part of the song, was sung by the members appeared on "HaruUta 2010" (春うた2010, Spring Songs 2010), live broadcast on March 27, 2010, by NHK.

== 2015 version ==
For the group's 10th anniversary, a new version of the song (along with Skirt, Hirari) was recorded for the opening track of the album 0 to 1 no Aida, featuring current members.

== 2025 version ==
For the group's 20th anniversary, a new version of the song was recorded as a coupling song for the single Masaka no Confession, featuring the current members, and Yui Oguri as the center.

== Reception ==
The single debuted at #10 in its first week, with 22,000 copies sold. It charted for a further three weeks in the top 50, before finally leaving the top 200 eight weeks after its initial chart entry, having doubled the sales from the first week.

The 2008 version was less commercially successful. While it also debuted at #10 with 22,000 copies sold in its first week, it only spent a single week in the top 50, leaving the charts five weeks after its initial week, selling a total of 25,000 copies.

This was the best-selling single from AKB48's independent period and their time under major label DefStar Records. The record would only be broken by their first single with King Records in 2008, "Ōgoe Diamond", which sold over 80,000 copies.

== Track listing ==
No.	Title	Writer(s)	Arranger	Length
1.	"Sakura no Hanabiratachi" (桜の花びらたち "Cherry Blossom Petals")	Yasushi Akimoto, Hiroshi Uesugi	Nobuhiko Kashiwara	5:24
2.	"Dear My Teacher"	Akimoto, Mion Okada	Jun Kageie	4:15
3.	"Sakura no Hanabiratachi (Karaoke version)"	Akimoto, Uesugi	Kashiwara	5:24
4.	"Dear My Teacher (Karaoke version)"	Akimoto, Okada	Kageie	4:15
Total length:				19:18

2008 regular/type A track list
No.	Title	Writer(s)	Arranger	Length
1.	"Sakura no Hanabiratachi 2008"	Akimoto, Uesugi	Kashiwara	5:20
2.	"Saigo no Seifuku" (最後の制服 "Final Uniform")	Akimoto, Shintaro Ito	Ito	4:36
3.	"Sakura no Hanabiratachi 2008 (instrumental)"	Akimoto, Uesugi	Kashiwara	5:20
4.	"Saigo no Seifuku (instrumental)"	Akimoto, Ito	Ito	4:33
Total length:				19:49

2008 type B track list
No.	Title	Writer(s)	Arranger	Length
1.	"Sakura no Hanabiratachi 2008"	Akimoto, Uesugi	Kashiwara	5:20
2.	"Saigo no Seifuku"	Akimoto, Ito	Ito	4:36
3.	"Sakura no Hanabiratachi 2008 (Gakkō Mix)" (桜の花びらたち2008（学校 Mix） "Cherry Blossom Petals 2008 (school mix)")	Akimoto, Uesugi	Akiyuki Tateyama	5:31
4.	"Sakura no Hanabiratachi 2008 (instrumental)"	Akimoto, Uesugi	Kashiwara	5:20
5.	"Saigo no Seifuku (instrumental)"	Akimoto, Ito	Ito	4:33
Total length:				25:19

== Charts ==
Chart	Peak position
Sakura no Hanabiratachi
Oricon Weekly Chart	10
Sakura no Hanabiratachi 2008
Oricon Weekly Chart	10
Billboard Japan Hot 100	26

=== Reported sales ===
Chart	Amount
Oricon physical sales	46,000
Oricon physical sales (2008 ver.)	25,000

== Personnel ==
- Produced By: Yasushi Akimoto
- Executive Producer: Yasushi Kubota, Kotaro Shiba
- Creative Direction and Photography and Edit: Yasumasa Yonehara
- Photography: Hirohisa Sako
- Hair and Make Up: Hiromi Kawano
- Design: Takumi Matsubara

== Other versions ==
- The Indonesian idol group JKT48, a sister group of AKB48, covered the song and named it "Kelopak-Kelopak Bunga Sakura". It was included on single Gingham Check. It was also performed on funerary of Inao Jiro, general manager.
- The Thai idol group BNK48, a sister group of AKB48, covered the song and named it "Khwamsongcham Lae Kham-amla" (Thai: ความทรงจำและคำอำลา; IPA: [kʰwaːm.soŋ.t͡ɕam lɛ́ʔ kʰam.ʔam.laː]; "Memories and Farewell"). It was included in the group's third single, "Shonichi – Wan Raek", released on 7 May 2018. The ghost of a girl reportedly appeared while this song was performed at the group's theatre, BNK48 The Campus, giving rise to the rumour that the place was haunted.
- The Filipino idol group MNL48, a sister group of AKB48, covered the song and named it "Talulot ng Sakura" It was released as a B-side to their debut single "Aitakatta - Gustong Makita", in 2018.
- The Chinese idol group SNH48, a former sister group of AKB48, covered the song and named it "Qingchun de Huaban" (青春的花瓣)
- The Taiwanese idol group AKB48 Team TP, covered the song and named it "Yinghua pan" (櫻花瓣), a coupling song from their debut single Yungwang chihch'ien.
