= Mai Oshima =

- 大島 麻衣
- Born: September 11, 1987 (age 38)
- Occupations: Japanese idol; singer; actress
- Musical career
- Genres: Pop
- Years active: 2005–present
- Labels: Defstar; Avex Trax
- Formerly of: AKB48
- Website: http://avexnet.or.jp/maimai/

Mai Oshima (大島 麻衣, Ōshima Mai; born September 11, 1987 in Noda, Chiba, Japan) is a singer and a former member of the Japanese all-girl pop group AKB48.

== Biography ==
In December 2005, Oshima became one of the 24 inaugural members of AKB48's Team A. Over the course of her career, she participated in most of AKB48's A-side singles. On April 26, 2007, it was announced that her contract would be transferred to Horipro. Upon joining the new talent agency, she was put on the roster of Xanadu loves NHC, a futsal team consisting of idols from Horipro; her jersey number was 18. Oshima made her first appearance on Kouhaku Uta Gassen, an annual music show where the most successful artists compete, with AKB48 on December 31, 2007.

On March 24, 2008, she participated in the opening party of Channel Café, a channel broadcasting simulator event, at Roppongi Hills, Tokyo. From April 2008, Oshima appeared regularly on the Movie Plus navigating show, Plus Style.

On February 21, 2009, she announced that she would be leaving AKB48, and, on April 26, she gave her final performance at NHK Hall.

Oshima made her solo debut in 2010 with the single "Mendokusai Aijō". It reached number seven and charted for 5 weeks. In 2012, she debut as an actress in the NHK drama Honjitsu wa Taian Nari.

== Discography ==
=== Singles ===
- "Mendokusai Aijō" (メンドクサイ愛情; "Troublesome Love") (May 5, 2010) – Oricon Peak: 7, sales: 16,447
- "Ai tte Nandahō" (愛ってナンダホー; "What The Hell Is Love?") (August 11, 2010) – Oricon Peak: 25, sales: 6,501
- "Second Lady" (July 27, 2011) – Oricon peak: 44, sales: 2,804

== Filmography ==
=== Films ===
- Crayon Shin-chan: The Storm Called: The Singing Buttocks Bomb (2007), Sarara
- Torihada: Gekijōban 2 (2014)

=== Dubbing ===
- The Three Musketeers (2011)

=== TV dramas ===
Year	English title	Japanese title	Role
2006	Densha Otoko Deluxe	電車男デラックス	Herself
2012	Honjitsu wa Taian Nari	本日は大安なり	Asuka Mita

== Bibliography ==
=== Photobooks ===
- B.L.T. vivid 2 (Tokyo News Service, March 21, 2008) ISBN 9784863360006
- Benkyō Sasete Itadakimashita (Wani Books, September 10, 2008) ISBN 9784847041235
- Fairy Tale (Wani Books, January 25, 2010) ISBN 9784847042454
