= Bokutachi wa Tatakawanai =

Single by AKB48

from the album 0 to 1 no Aida
- A-side: "Bokutachi wa Tatakawanai"
- B-side: "Summer Side" (Types A, B, C, and the Theater Edition); "Danshi wa Kenkyū Taishō" (Type A); "Kafka to Dendenmu Chu!" (Type B); "Kegarete Iru Shinjitsu" (Type C); "Barebare Bushi" (Type D); "Kimi no Dai Ni Shō" (Type D); "Deai no Hi, Wakare no Hi" (Theater Edition)
- Released: May 20, 2015
- Genre: J-pop; Electro-pop; Alternative Rock
- Length: 5:26
- Label: You, Be Cool! / King; Genie Music; Stone Music Entertainment
- Songwriters: Lyrics: Yasushi Akimoto; Music: Yo-He, Hiroshi Sasaki, Yasuhiro Mizushima, etc.
- Producer: Yasushi Akimoto

AKB48 singles chronology
"Green Flash" (2015)	"Bokutachi wa Tatakawanai" (2015)	"Halloween Night" (2015)

"Bokutachi wa Tatakawanai" Music Video
- Short version on YouTube
- Full version on JPOPSUKI
- Long version on YouTube

"Bokutachi wa Tatakawanai" (僕たちは戦わない; "We Won't Fight") is the 40th single by the Japanese idol girl group AKB48. It was released in Japan on May 20, 2015. AKB48's Chinese sister group, AKB48 Team SH, made their own Chinese version of the song.

== Background ==
Haruka Shimazaki serves as choreography center of this single's title song. It is also the last AKB48 single featuring members Rina Kawaei, SKE48 member Rena Matsui, and Nogizaka46 member Rina Ikoma, both two members (except Ikoma, who was a concurrent member of AKB48 and cancelled her concurrency after AKB48 Spring Shuffle will took effect) left the AKB48 group after the release of this single. Despite being the last single whom she appeared in, Kawaei is still featured in their next single Halloween Night (song), but in the coupling song “Yankee Machine Gun” as a graduated member.

== Release ==
The single was released in several versions: Type A (two editions: limited and regular), Type B (limited and regular), Type C (limited and regular), Type D (limited and regular), and a version called the "Theater Edition". All versions, except the Theater Edition, include a DVD with several music videos.

The first presses of the single came with a ticket to vote in the AKB48 41st Single Senbatsu Election (to choose the members to be featured in the next AKB48's single, to be released in the summer.)

== Music video ==
The music video for the title track was directed by Keishi Ōtomo, best known as the director of the Ruroni Kenshin movie series. Unlike other Summer-themed AKB48 singles, this single's MV does not have a paradise scenery and girls in bathing suits. Instead, they focused more on action and most complex choreography that had been set aside in "Kibōteki Refrain".

== Reception ==
The single debuted at number one on Oricon's daily singles chart for the day of May 19, 2015, with sales of 1,472,375 copies. It also topped the weekly Oricon Singles Chart on the June 1 week, selling 1,673,211 copies. It also reached number one on the Billboard Japan Hot 100.

== Track listings ==
=== Type A ===
All lyrics are written by Yasushi Akimoto.

CD
No.	Title	Music	Length
1.	"Bokutachi wa Tatakawanai" (僕たちは戦わない)	Yo-Hey	5:26
2.	"Summer Side" (Summer side) (performed by Selection 16)	Yasuhiro Mizushima	4:53
3.	""Danshi" wa Kenkyū Taishō" (“ダンシ”は研究対象) (performed by Tentōmu Chu!)	Daisuke Itō	4:21
4.	"Bokutachi wa Tatakawanai" (off-vocal ver.)		5:26
5.	"Summer Side" (off-vocal ver.)		4:53
6.	""Danshi" wa Kenkyū Taishō" (off-vocal ver.)		4:19
Total length:			29:20

DVD
No.	Title	Length
1.	"Bokutachi wa Tatakawanai" (music video)
2.	"Summer Side" (music video)
3.	""Danshi" wa Kenkyū Taishō" (music video)

=== Type B ===
All lyrics are written by Yasushi Akimoto.

CD
No.	Title	Music	Length
1.	"Bokutachi wa Tatakawanai"		5:26
2.	"Summer Side" (performed by Selection 16)		4:54
3.	"Kafka to Dendenmu Chu!" (カフカとでんでんむChu!) (performed by Dendenmu Chu!)	you-me	5:04
4.	"Bokutachi wa Tatakawanai" (off-vocal ver.)		5:26
5.	"Summer Side" (off-vocal ver.)		4:54
6.	"Kafka to Dendenmu Chu!" (off-vocal ver.)		5:01
Total length:			30:47

DVD
No.	Title	Length
1.	"Bokutachi wa Tatakawanai" (music video)
2.	"Summer Side" (music video)
3.	"Kafka to Dendenmu Chu!" (music video)

=== Type C ===
All lyrics are written by Yasushi Akimoto.

CD
No.	Title	Length
1.	"Bokutachi wa Tatakawanai"	5:26
2.	"Summer Side" (performed by Selection 16)	4:54
3.	"Kegarete Iru Shinjitsu" (汚れている真実) (performed by Team 8 Sembatsu)	4:17
4.	"Bokutachi wa Tatakawanai" (off-vocal ver.)	5:26
5.	"Summer Side" (off-vocal ver.)	4:54
6.	"Kegarete Iru Shinjitsu" (off-vocal ver.)	4:15
Total length:		29:13

DVD
No.	Title	Length
1.	"Bokutachi wa Tatakawanai" (music video)
2.	"Summer Side" (music video)
3.	"Kegarete Iru Shinjitsu" (music video)

=== Type D ===
All lyrics are written by Yasushi Akimoto.

CD
No.	Title	Length
1.	"Bokutachi wa Tatakawanai"	5:26
2.	"Barebare Bushi" (バレバレ節) (performed by Wonda Sembatsu)	5:40
3.	"Kimi no Dai Ni Shō" (君の第二章)	5:42
4.	"Bokutachi wa Tatakawanai" (off-vocal ver.)	5:26
5.	"Barebare Bushi" (off-vocal ver.)	5:40
6.	"Kimi no Dai Ni Shō" (off-vocal ver.)	5:40
Total length:		33:37

DVD
No.	Title	Length
1.	"Bokutachi wa Tatakawanai" (music video)
2.	"Barebare Bushi" (music video)
3.	"Kimi no Dai Ni Shō" (music video)

=== Theater Edition ===
All lyrics are written by Yasushi Akimoto.

CD
No.	Title	Length
1.	"Bokutachi wa Tatakawanai"	5:26
2.	"Summer Side" (performed by Selection 16)	4:54
3.	"Deai no Hi, Wakare no Hi" (出逢いの日、別れの日) (performed by Gensō & Jikisō)
4.	"Bokutachi wa Tatakawanai" (off-vocal ver.)	5:26
5.	"Summer Side" (off-vocal ver.)	4:54
6.	"Kimi no Dai Ni Shō" (off-vocal ver.)

== Members ==
=== "Bokutachi wa Tatakawanai" ===
The sembatsu (member selection) for the song consists of 32 members. The center is Haruka Shimazaki.

- AKB48 Team A: Nana Owada, Rina Kawaei, Haruna Kojima, Haruka Shimazaki, Minami Takahashi, Yui Yokoyama
- AKB48 Team K: Yuka Tano, Minami Minegishi, Mion Mukaichi, Tomu Muto
- AKB48 Team B: Ryoka Oshima, Yuki Kashiwagi, Rena Kato, Yuria Kizaki, Mayu Watanabe
- AKB48 Team 4: Nana Okada, Saya Kawamoto, Mako Kojima, Juri Takahashi
- AKB48 Team 8: Ikumi Nakano, Nagisa Sakaguchi
- SKE48 Team S: Ryoha Kitagawa, Jurina Matsui
- SKE48 Team E: Akari Suda, Rena Matsui
- NMB48 Team N: Sayaka Yamamoto
- NMB48 Team BII: Miyuki Watanabe
- HKT48 Team H: Haruka Kodama, Rino Sashihara
- HKT48 Team KIV: Sakura Miyawaki
- SNH48 Team SII: Sae Miyazawa
- Nogizaka46: Rina Ikoma

=== "Summer Side" ===
The song is performed by a unit called Selection 16, consisting of 16 members, who sang in the title track, but didn't appear in the music video.

- AKB48 Team A: Nana Owada
- AKB48 Team K: Yuka Tano, Minami Minegishi, Tomu Muto
- AKB48 Team B: Ryoka Oshima
- AKB48 Team 4: Nana Okada, Saya Kawamoto, Mako Kojima, Juri Takahashi
- AKB48 Team 8: Ikumi Nakano, Nagisa Sakaguchi
- SKE48 Team S: Ryoha Kitagawa
- SKE48 Team E: Akari Suda
- NMB48 Team BII: Miyuki Watanabe
- HKT48 Team H: Haruka Kodama
- SNH48 Team SII: Sae Miyazawa

=== "Barebare Bushi" ===
The song is performed by a unit called Wonda Sembatsu (WONDA選抜), consisting of 5 members.

- AKB48 Team A: Haruka Shimazaki, Minami Takahashi, Yui Yokoyama
- AKB48 Team B: Yuki Kashiwagi, Mayu Watanabe

=== "'Danshi' wa Kenkyū Taishō" ===
The song is performed by a unit called Tentōmu Chu! (てんとうむChu!), consisting of 7 members.

- AKB48 Team 4: Nana Okada, Mako Kojima, Miki Nishino
- SKE48 Team S: Ryoha Kitagawa
- NMB48 Team BII: Nagisa Shibuya
- HKT48 Team H: Meru Tashima
- HKT48 Team KIV: Mio Tomonaga

=== "Kafka to Dendenmu Chu!" ===
The song is performed by a unit called Dendenmu Chu! (でんでんむchu!), consisting of 7 members.

- AKB48 Team A: Nana Owada, Megu Taniguchi
- AKB48 Team K: Mion Mukaichi
- AKB48 Team 4: Yuiri Murayama, Saya Kawamoto
- HKT48 Team H: Nako Yabuki, Miku Tanaka

=== "Kegarete Iru Shinjitsu" ===
The song is performed by selected members from AKB48's Team 8 (チーム8選抜}; "Team 8 Sembatsu").

- AKB48 Team 8: Nagisa Sakaguchi, Yui Yokoyama, Hijiri Tanikawa, Nanami Sato, Hitomi Honda, Yuri Yokomichi, Serika Nagano, Nanami Yamada, Ikumi Nakano, Narumi Kuranoo

=== "Kimi no Dai Ni Shō" ===
It is Rina Kawaei's graduation song.

- AKB48 Team A: Rina Kawaei, Anna Iriyama, Haruna Kojima, Haruka Shimazaki, Minami Takahashi, Yui Yokoyama
- AKB48 Team B: Yuki Kashiwagi, Yuria Kizaki, Mayu Watanabe
- AKB48 Team 4: Juri Takahashi
- SKE48 Team S: Jurina Matsui
- NMB48 Team N: Sayaka Yamamoto
- HKT48 Team H: Rino Sashihara

=== "Deai no Hi, Wakare no Hi" ===
The song performed by the duet Gensō & Jikisō (ゲンソー&ジキソー).

- AKB48 Team A: Minami Takahashi, Yui Yokoyama

== Charts ==
Chart (2015)	Peak position	Initial sales
Billboard Japan Hot 100	1	
Oricon Daily Singles Chart	1	1,472,375
Oricon Weekly Singles Chart	1	1,673,211

== Release history ==
Region	Date	Format	Label
Japan	May 20, 2015	CD; digital download; streaming	King Records (YOU BE COOL division)
Hong Kong, Taiwan	May 20, 2015	CD; digital download; streaming	King Records
South Korea	November 16, 2018	digital download; streaming	Stone Music Entertainment; Genie Music; King
