= Ōgoe Diamond =

- Regular Edition cover featuring Jurina Matsui

Single by AKB48

from the album Kamikyokutachi
- B-side: "109 (Marukyū)"
- Released: October 22, 2008 (Japan)
- Genre: J-pop
- Label: You, Be Cool! / King
- Songwriters: Yasushi Akimoto, Yoshimasa Inoue
- Producer: Yasushi Akimoto

AKB48 singles chronology
"Baby! Baby! Baby!" (2008)	"Ōgoe Diamond" (2008)	"10nen Zakura" (2009)

Music video
- "Ōgoe Diamond" on YouTube

"Ōgoe Diamond" (大声ダイヤモンド, Ōgoe Daiyamondo) is the 10th major single by the Japanese idol group AKB48, the 12th overall and the first on King Records, released on October 22, 2008. It was the first single for Jurina Matsui from SKE48 and also the first AKB48's single to feature a member of the sister group. It reached number 3 in the Oricon weekly singles chart.

== Release ==
The single was released in two versions, CD+DVD both: Regular Edition (通常盤) (catalog number KIZM-23/4) and Theater Edition (劇場盤) (catalog number NKZM-1001/2). This song is also used as the theme song for the AKB48 unit, no3b's drama, "Mendol ~Ikemen Idol~".

== Track listing ==
=== Regular edition ===
All lyrics are written by Yasushi Akimoto.

CD
No.	Title	Music	Arranger	Length
1.	"Ōgoe Diamond" (大声ダイヤモンド)	Yoshimasa Inoue	Yoshimasa Inoue
2.	"109 (Marukyū)" (109（マルキュー）)	Shintaro Ito	Yūichi "Masa" Nonaka
3.	"Ōgoe Diamond / Team A"	Inoue
4.	"Ōgoe Diamond / Team B"	Inoue
Total length:				16:21

DVD

No.	Title	Length
1.	"Ōgoe Diamond (music video)" (「大声ダイヤモンド ビデオクリップ)
2.	"Making of 'Ōgoe Diamond'" (Making of 「大声ダイヤモンド」)

Bonus (First press only)

- Handshake event ticket (Tokyo, Aichi, Osaka, Fukuoka)
- Another jacket (19 kinds, all selected members except Jurina Matsui)

=== Theater Edition ===
CD

All lyrics are written by Yasushi Akimoto.

No.	Title	Music	Arranger	Length
1.	"Ōgoe Diamond" (大声ダイヤモンド)	Yoshimasa Inoue	Yoshimasa Inoue
2.	"109 (Marukyū)" (109（マルキュー）)	Shintaro Ito	Yūichi "Masa" Nonaka
3.	"Ōgoe Diamond / Team K"	Inoue
4.	"Ōgoe Diamond / Kenkyusei"	Inoue
5.	"Ōgoe Diamond / SKE48"	Inoue
Total length:				16:21

DVD

No.	Title	Writer(s)	Length
1.	"Ōgoe Diamond (music video)" (「大声ダイヤモンド ビデオクリップ)
2.	"Kokuhaku Eizō" (告白映像)
3.	"SKE48 no Kiseki" (告白映像)	SKE48の軌跡

Bonus (First press only)

- Handshake event ticket (AKB48 Theater, SUNSHINE STUDIO)
- One photo (of 90 different kinds: Team A, K, B, Kenkyusei, SKE48)

== Selected members ==
It was the first selection for Rie Kitahara, Miho Miyazaki, Rino Sashihara, Jurina Matsui. While Rina Nakanishi, Ayaka Umeda, Megumi Ohori, who participated in "Baby! Baby! Baby!", didn't make the selection this time.

(Team affiliation at the time of the release.)

Center : Jurina Matsui.

- Team A: Tomomi Itano, Mai Ōshima, Nozomi Kawasaki, Rie Kitahara, Haruna Kojima, Yukari Satō, Mariko Shinoda, Minami Takahashi, Atsuko Maeda, Minami Minegishi, Miho Miyazaki
- Team K: Sayaka Akimoto, Yūko Ōshima, Erena Ono, Tomomi Kasai, Sae Miyazawa
- Team B: Yuki Kashiwagi, Rino Sashihara, Mayu Watanabe
- SKE48: Jurina Matsui

== Charts ==
Chart	Peak position
Japan (Oricon Weekly Singles Chart)	3
Japan Hot 100 (Billboard)	13
Japan (RIAJ Digital Track Chart)	51*

*charted in 2010.

== Other versions ==
- The Thai idol group BNK48, a sister group of AKB48, covered the song and named it "Ko Chop Hai Ru Wa Chop" (Thai: ก็ชอบให้รู้ว่าชอบ; IPA: [kɔ̂: t͡ɕʰɔ̂:p hâj rú: wâ: t͡ɕʰɔ̂:p]; "I Like You, So I Let You Know That I Like You"). First performed on 2 June 2017 at the group's debut event in Bangkok, the song was included on the group's debut single, "Aitakatta – Yak Cha Dai Phop Thoe", officially released on 8 August 2017.
- On June 1, 2022, Spy, a shuffle unit of WACK featuring Yuki Kashiwagi released a cover of the song as a B-side on their single "Anata wo Nerai Uchi♡" (あなたを狙い撃ち♡).
