= Labrador Retriever (song) =

- Type-A Regular Edition Cover

Single by AKB48

from the album Koko ga Rhodes da, Koko de Tobe!
- B-side: "Kyō made no Melody"; "Itoshiki Rival"; "B Garden"; "Heart no Dasshutsu Game"; "Futari wa Dekiteru"
- Released: May 21, 2014
- Genre: J-pop
- Length: 4:55
- Label: You, Be Cool! / King
- Songwriter: Yasushi Akimoto (lyrics)
- Producer: Yasushi Akimoto

AKB48 singles chronology
"Mae shika Mukanee" (2014)	"Labrador Retriever" (2014)	"Kokoro no Placard" (2014)

Music video
- AKB48 "Labrador Retriever" on YouTube

"Labrador Retriever" (ラブラドール・レトリバー, Raburadōru Retoribā) is the 36th single by the Japanese idol girl group AKB48. It was released in Japan on May 21, 2014 by King Records. This single was first performed at AKB48's concert in the National Olympic Stadium on March 29. It was the best-selling single of the year in Japan, with 1,786,825 copies.

== Synopsis ==
The song tells the story of two young lovers who meet again at the beach resort where they had first met during the previous summer. They have arrived early this year, because they had not had enough time together the year before for their relationship to even progress to their first kiss—she asks if they should do that now. They had met when chasing the girl's childhood pet, a Labrador Retriever, as he played along the water's edge; this inspired her to give her new love the nickname "Labrador." The three of them chase across the beach as they had that first day, and she calls her love into her arms and asks (for the third time) if they should have their first kiss.

This song plays on not only the theme of first love, but also of the ways that people will "break the ice" by finding outside factors—in this case, chasing the dog—upon which to focus as an excuse to slowly come closer to a relationship. Her fear is exhibited by making a point of wearing a less-revealing 1970s-style bikini, then suggesting that she wore it because it's HIS favorite style. Having arranged to meet early (before their parents had arrived), the dog is once again the outside factor that provides a non-embarrassing reason to be together, while trying to overcome their inexperience with love. The protagonist is eager yet shy, so she talks about her pet as she works up her courage to call him into her arms, then to ask for that first kiss.

== Music video ==
The promotional video for Labrador Retriever begins with a woman in a kitchen, as she pours dog food into a metal bowl. The sound echoes through the house, surrounding sleeping teen girl Mayu Watanabe, and inspiring a dream in which she and other members of the group dance on a beach, in 1970s-style bikinis. As they dance, a Labrador Retriever approaches some of those same girls "in town," wearing street clothing. The dog is wearing a distinctive necklace, which is recognized by one of the girls as having been worn by their friend. As the dog runs away, they follow. The dog makes contact with other groups of girls, who take up the chase. As they arrive at the beach, the "town girls" and dancers pause to look at each other in confusion, then the Labrador runs toward the dancers. As the girls from town follow, the dancers hold out their arms in invitation and we then see that those running are now dogs. As they reach the dancers, they are once again girls, prancing like dogs excitedly greeting their people; visual effects make it possible for girls to be with themselves. The dancers are suddenly again with dogs, who run away and return to their earlier activities (this time as dogs rather than as girls). Watanabe wakes from her dream, and sits up in bed, as her Labrador watches. She turns to smile at the dog—then barks!

While not obvious the first time the video is viewed, a connection is easily made in subsequent plays when the Labrador first appears, running away from the dress and girl's shoes that Watanabe wears as a "town girl."

== Background ==
The lyrics were written by Yasushi Akimoto. In this single, Watanabe returns as the center of the main song after the release of "So Long !" 1 year and 3 months earlier. The main song in this single, "Labrador Retriever", was revealed to the public on March 29, 2014 during the encore session of their first concert at the National Olympic Stadium.

This single will be released in five types; Type A (Normal / Limited Edition), Type K (Normal / Limited Edition), Type B (Normal / Limited Edition), Type 4 (Normal / Limited Edition) and Theater Edition.

The first presses of the single came with a ticket to vote in the AKB48 37th Single Senbatsu Election (to choose the members to be featured in the next AKB48's single, to be released in the summer.)

AKB48 has been releasing a summer-themed CD in May every year since "Ponytail to Shushu", which was released in May 2010. 36 members were chosen to participate in the A-side song "Labrador Retriever", which has the same number as their 2012 single "Manatsu no Sounds Good!", but 4 more than last year's summer single, "Sayonara Crawl", that featured only 32 members. This is also their first single to release after AKB48 Group Grand Team Reshuffling Festival 2014 (AKB48 Group Daisokaku Matsuri / AKB48 グループ大組閣祭り). This single included the Graduation song of Yuko Oshima. This single marks as the first single to have Nogizaka46 member included in this single (Rina Ikoma).

== Track listing ==
The first two songs on the CDs and the first two music videos on the DVDs are the same for all versions.

=== Type A ===
All lyrics are written by Yasushi Akimoto.

CD: KIZM-283, KIZM-90283
No.	Title	Music	Performing units	Length
1.	"Labrador Retriever" (ラブラドール・レトリバー)	Manabu Marutani
2.	"Kyō made no Melody" (今日までのメロディー, "The Melody Until Today", Yuko Oshima's graduation song)	Yoshimasa Inoue
3.	"Kimi wa Kimagure" (君は気まぐれ, "You Are Fickle")	Shintarō Itō	Team A
4.	"Labrador Retriever" (off vocal ver.)
5.	"Kyō made no Melody" (off vocal ver.)
6.	"Kimi wa Kimagure" (off vocal ver.)

DVD: KIZM-284, KIZM-90284
No.	Title	Director	Length
1.	"Labrador Retriever Music Video"	Tatsuyuki Kobayashi
2.	"Kyō made no Melody Music Video" (今日までのメロディー Music Video)
3.	"Kimi wa Kimagure Music Video" (君は気まぐれ Music Video)
4.	"Nakamura 'Kengai' Mariko's Hosaremen Talk" (中村"圏外"麻里子の干されメン講座)

=== Type K ===
All lyrics are written by Yasushi Akimoto.

CD: KIZM-285, KIZM-90285
No.	Title	Music	Performing units	Length
3.	"Itoshiki Rival" (愛しきライバル "My Dear Rival")	Fuku Takafumi	Team K
6.	"Itoshiki Rival" (off vocal ver.)

DVD: KIZM-286, KIZM-90286
No.	Title	Length
3.	"Itoshiki Rival Music Video" (愛しきライバル Music Video)
4.	"Making of Labrador Retriever First Part" (Making of ラブラドール・レトリバー 前編)

=== Type B ===
All lyrics are written by Yasushi Akimoto.

CD: KIZM-287, KIZM-90287
No.	Title	Music	Performing units	Length
3.	"B Garden" (Bガーデン)	Katsuhiko Yamamoto	Team B
6.	"B Garden" (off vocal ver.)

DVD: KIZM-288, KIZM-90288
No.	Title	Length
3.	"B Garden Music Video" (Bガーデン Music Video)
4.	"Making of Labrador Retriever Latter Part" (Making of ラブラドール・レトリバー 後編)

=== Type 4 ===
All lyrics are written by Yasushi Akimoto.

CD: KIZM-289, KIZM-90289
No.	Title	Music	Performing units	Length
3.	"Heart no Dasshutsu Game" (ハートの脱出ゲーム "The Heart Escape Game")	Fuku Takafumi	Team 4
6.	"Heart no Dasshutsu Game" (off vocal ver.)

DVD: KIZM-290, KIZM-90290
No.	Title	Length
3.	"Heart no Dasshutsu Game Music Video" (ハートの脱出ゲーム Music Video)
4.	"Yuria Kizaki's Team 4 Music Video Micchaku Report" (木崎ゆりあのTeam 4 Music Video密着レポート)

=== Theater Edition ===
All lyrics are written by Yasushi Akimoto.

CD: NMAX-1166
No.	Title	Music	Length
3.	"Futari wa Dekiteru" (2人はデキテル, "We Were Cheating")	Kazuya Izumi
6.	"Futari wa Dekiteru" (off vocal ver.)

== Members ==
=== "Labrador Retriever" ===
The center performer for the title track is Mayu Watanabe. The list of performers is as follows:

- AKB48：Anna Iriyama, Rina Kawaei, Haruna Kojima, Haruka Shimazaki, Minami Takahashi, Rie Kitahara, Mako Kojima, Yui Yokoyama, Nana Owada, Juri Takahashi, Mayu Watanabe, Yuki Kashiwagi, Nana Okada, Rena Katō, Yuria Kizaki, Miki Nishino, Minami Minegishi
- SKE48: Ryoha Kitagawa, Jurina Matsui, Mina Ōba, Nao Furuhata, Akari Suda, Kanon Kimoto, Rena Matsui
- NMB48: Sayaka Yamamoto, Fūko Yagura, Miori Ichikawa, Shu Yabushita, Nagisa Shibuya, Miyuki Watanabe
- HKT48: Rino Sashihara, Meru Tashima, Haruka Kodama, Aika Ōta, Sakura Miyawaki, Mio Tomonaga

=== "Kyou Made no Melody" ===
Yuko Oshima's graduation song.

- Team A: Rina Kawaei, Haruna Kojima, Haruka Shimazaki, Minami Takahashi
- Team K: Yuko Oshima, Rie Kitahara, Mako Kojima, Kana Kobayashi, Yui Yokoyama
- Team B: Yuki Kashiwagi, Asuka Kuramochi, Mayu Watanabe
- Team 4: Minami Minegishi
- SKE48 Team S: Jurina Matsui
- NMB48 Team BII: Ayaka Umeda
- SNH48 Team SII: Sae Miyazawa
- Graduates: Sayaka Akimoto, Yu Imai, Megumi Ohori, Tomomi Kasai, Natsuki Sato, Ayana Takada, Kayo Noro, Kaoru Hayano, Yuka Masuda, Natsumi Matsubara

=== "Kimi wa Kimagure" ===
- Team A: Manami Ichikawa, Anna Iriyama, Karen Iwata, Haruka Katayama, Rina Kawaei, Natsuki Kojima, Haruna Kojima, Haruka Shimazaki, Minami Takahashi, Kayoko Takita, Makiho Tatsuya, Chisato Nakata, Chiyori Nakanishi, Mariko Nakamura, Rena Nishiyama, Nana Fujita, Nao Furuhata (SKE48 Team KII), Ami Maeda, Sakiko Matsui, Sakura Miyawaki (HKT48 Team KIV), Tomu Muto, Ayaka Morikawa, Fuuko Yagura (NMB48 Team M)

=== "Itoshiki Rival" ===
- Team K: Moe Aigasa, Maria Abe, Haruka Ishida, Misaki Iwasa, Mayumi Uchida, Rie Kitahara, Mako Kojima, Haruka Kodama (HKT48 Team H), Kana Kobayashi, Moe Gotou, Haruka Shimada, Hinana Shimoguchi, Shihori Suzuki, Mariya Suzuki (SNH48 Team SII), Yuka Tano, Mariya Nagao, Jurina Matsui (SKE48 Team S), Miho Miyazaki, Sayaka Yamamoto (NMB48 Team N), Ami Yumoto, Yui Yokoyama

=== "B Garden" ===
- Team B: Rina Ikoma (Nogizaka46), Rina Izuta, Natsuki Uchiyama, Ayano Umeta, Ryoka Oshima, Shizuka Oya, Nana Owada, Mayu Ogasawara, Yuki Kashiwagi (NMB48 Team N), Saya Kawamoto, Asuka Kuramochi, Aki Takajo, Juri Takahashi, Miyu Takeuchi, Miku Tanabe, Mio Tomonaga (HKT48 Team KIV), Wakana Natori, Rena Nozawa, Hikari Hashimoto, Rina Hirata, Seina Fukuoka, Aeri Yokoshima, Mayu Watanabe

=== "Heart no Dasshutsu Game" ===
- Team 4: Saho Iwatate, Rio Okawa, Miyu Omori, Ayaka Okada, Nana Okada, Rena Kato, Yuria Kizaki, Saki Kitazawa, Riho Kotani (NMB48 Team N), Marina Kobayashi, Haruka Komiyama, Yukari Sasaki, Kiara Sato, Ayana Shinozaki, Nagisa Shibuya (NMB48 Team BII), Yurina Takashima, Mizuki Tsuchiyasu, Miki Nishino, Mitsuki Maeda, Minami Minegishi, Mion Mukaichi, Yuiri Murayama, Shinobu Mogi

=== "Futari wa Dekiteru" ===
- Team A: Haruna Kojima
- AKB48 Group Staff: Kenji Kitagawa

== Release history ==
Date	Version	Catalog	Format	Label
May 28, 2014	Type-A	First Press Limited Edition (KIZM-90283~4) Regular Edition (KIZM-283~4)	CD+DVD	King Records
May 28, 2014	Type-K	First Press Limited Edition (KIZM-90285~6) Regular Edition (KIZM-285~6)	CD+DVD	King Records
May 28, 2014	Type-B	First Press Limited Edition (KIZM-90287~8) Regular Edition (KIZM-287~8)	CD+DVD	King Records
May 28, 2014	Type-4	First Press Limited Edition (KIZM-90289~90290) Regular Edition (KIZM-289~290)	CD+DVD	King Records
May 28, 2014	Theater	Regular Version (NMAX-1166)	CD	King Records

== Charts ==
Chart (2014)	Peak position
Billboard Japan Hot 100	1
Oricon Daily Singles Chart	1
Oricon Weekly Singles Chart	1
