= Nana Owada =

Japanese television personality and actress (born 1999)

Owada Nana 大和田 南那
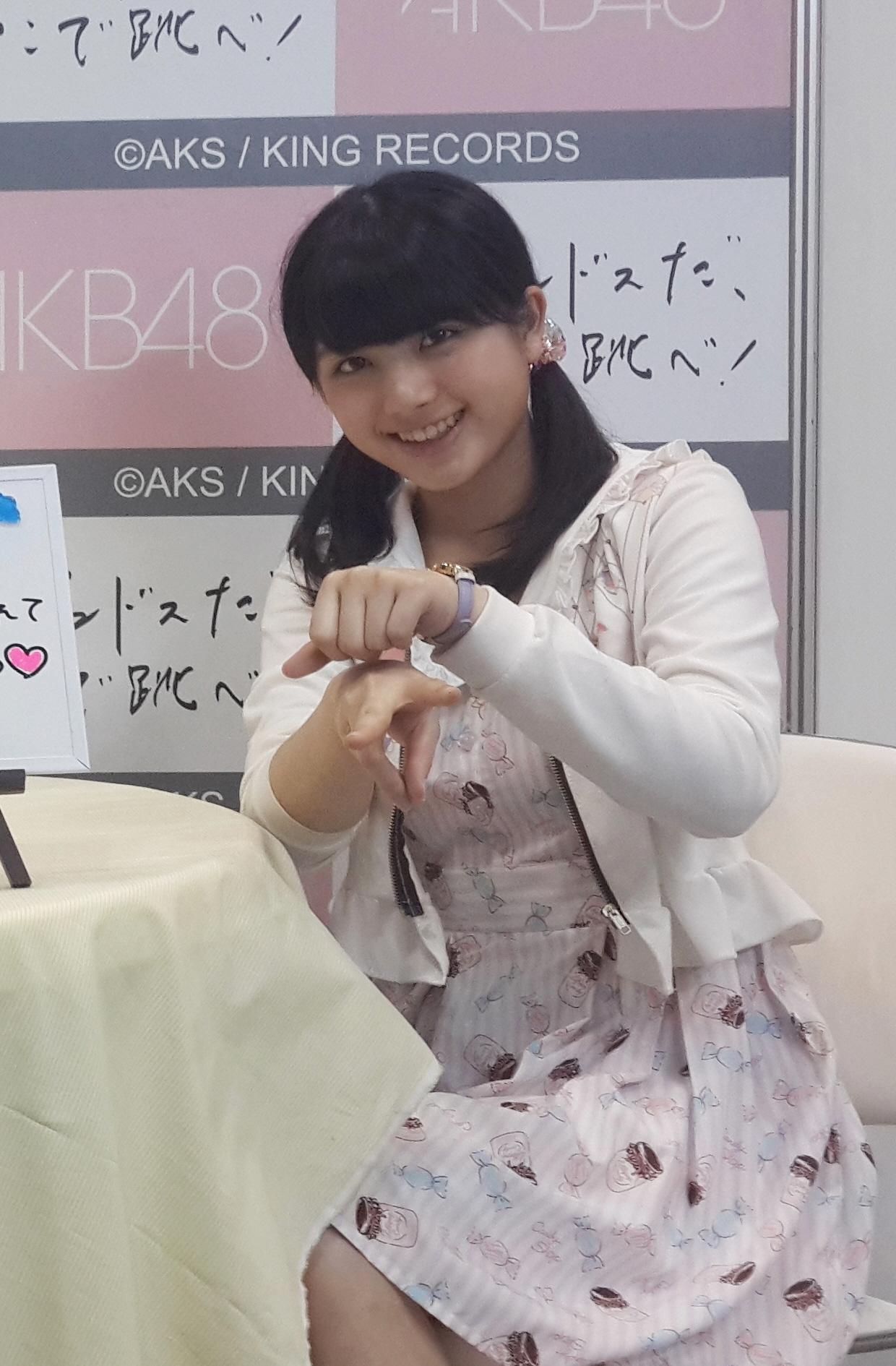

Background information
- Also known as: Nānya (なーにゃ)
- Born: 15 September 1999 (age 26); Chiba Prefecture, Japan
- Origin: Tokyo, Japan
- Genres: J-pop
- Occupations: Television personality; actress
- Instruments: Vocals
- Years active: 2013–present
- Label: Asia Promotion
- Spouse: "Ki-chan" (m. 2024)
- Past members: AKB48 (2013–2017)

Nana Owada (大和田 南那, Ōwada Nana; born 15 September 1999 in Chiba Prefecture) is a Japanese television personality, actress, and former member of the Japanese idol girl group AKB48. She is a former member of AKB48's Team A.

== Career ==
Owada passed AKB48's 15th generation auditions on 19 January 2013. She debuted as a back dancer for Team K's stage performance on 30 April 2013. Her theater debut was on 9 June 2013. On 24 February 2014, it was announced that Owada would be promoted to Team B.

In April 2014, she debuted as an actress in Sailor Zombie, a drama about high school students.

On 26 March 2015, it was announced that Owada Nana would be transferred to AKB48 Team A.

On 29 November 2016, Owada announced her graduation.

On 18 March 2017, Owada graduated from the group's Team A.

Owada Nana released her first solo photobook titled "Risutaato" in September, 2019.

== Private life ==
In June 2024, Owada revealed through her official social media account that she had registered her marriage with her non-celebrity partner, whom she's been dating for some time.

== Discography ==
=== AKB48 singles ===
Year	No.	Title	Role	Notes
2013	33	"Heart Electric"	B-side	Sang 'Kimi no Hitomi wa Planetarium' together with the trainee members.
2013	34	"Suzukake no Ki no Michi de "Kimi no Hohoemi o Yume ni Miru" to Itte Shimattara Bokutachi no Kankei wa Dō Kawatte Shimau no ka, Bokunari ni Nan-nichi ka Kangaeta Ue de no Yaya Kihazukashii Ketsuron no Yō na Mono"	B-side, Center	Sang 'Party is over'
2014	35	"Mae Shika Mukanee"	B-side	Sang 'Kinou Yori Motto Suki' as part of one-shot unit 'Smiling Lions'.
2014	36	"Labrador Retriever"	A-side	First A-side. Also sang 'B Garden' as part of Team B.
2014	37	"Kokoro no Placard"	B-side	Sang 'Oshiete Mommy'
2014	38	"Kibouteki Refrain"	A-side	Also sang 'Loneliness Club' as part of Team B.
2015	39	"Green Flash"	B-side	Sang "Haru no Hikari Chikadzuita Natsu" and "Yankee Rock"
2015	40	"Bokutachi wa Tatakawanai"	A-side, Dendenmu Chu!	Sang on "Bokutachi wa Tatakawanai" without participating in the music video. Also sang on "Summer Side" as Selection 16 and "Kafka to Dendenmu Chu!" as Dendenmu Chu! sub-unit.
2015	41	"Halloween Night"	Under Girls	Ranked 75th in 2015 General Election. Sang on "Kimi Dake ga Akimeiteita" and "Ippome Ondo".
2015	42	"Kuchibiru ni Be My Baby"	B-Side	Also sang on "Kimi wo Kimi wo Kimi wo...", "Yasashii place" as Team A and "Senaka Kotoba".
2016	43	"Kimi wa Melody"	B-side	Marked as the 10th Anniversary Single. Also sang "LALALA Message", "Mazariau Mono" as NogizakaAKB and "M.T ni Sasagu" as Team A.
2016	44	"Tsubasa wa Iranai"	B-side	Sang "Set me free" as Team A.
2016	45	"Love Trip / Shiawase wo Wakenasai"	B-side	Sang "Kishi ga Mieru Umi Kara" as Future Girls.

== Appearances ==
=== Stage units ===
AKB48 Kenkyusei Stage "Pajama Drive" (パジャマドライブ)

1. "Temodemo no Namida" (てもでもの涙)

Team B 3rd Stage "Pajama Drive" (パジャマドライブ) (Revival)

1. "Tenshi no Shippo" (天使のしっぽ)
2. "Temodemo no Namida" (てもでもの涙)

=== TV variety ===
- AKBingo! (2013–2016 )
- AKB48 no Anta Dare? (AKB48のあんた、誰?) (2013–2016 )
- Ariyoshi AKB Kyowakoku (有吉AKB共和国) (2014–2016 )
- AKB Nemousu TV (AKBネ申テレビ) (2014–2016 )
- AKB48 Show! (2013–2016 )

=== TV dramas ===
- Sailor Zombie (セーラーゾンビ) (TV Tokyo, 2014), Maiko
- Majisuka Gakuen 4 (マジすか学園4) (NTV, 2015), Zombie
- Majisuka Gakuen 5 (マジすか学園5) (NTV, 2015), Zombie
- Mashin Sentai Kiramager (TV Asahi, 2020), Yodomehime (episode 10)

=== Musicals ===
- AKB49 Stage Play (2014)
