= Densen Uta =

- Theatrical release poster
- Directed by: Masato Harada
- Screenplay by: Daisuke Habara; Masato Harada
- Story by: Yasushi Akimoto
- Produced by: Masato Harada
- Starring: Ryuhei Matsuda; Yūsuke Iseya; Atsuko Maeda; Yuko Oshima; Sayaka Akimoto; Haruna Kojima
- Cinematography: Jun'ichi Fujisawa; Mitsunori Kōgo
- Edited by: Sōichi Ueno
- Music by: Kuniaki Haishima
- Production companies: Dentsu; TV Asahi; Geneon Entertainment; Sony Music Entertainment
- Distributed by: Shochiku
- Release date: August 25, 2007 (Japan)
- Running time: 128 minutes
- Country: Japan
- Language: Japanese

Densen Uta (Japanese: 伝染歌; lit. Contagious Song), also known as The Suicide Song, is a 2007 Japanese satiric Japanese horror film produced by Shochiku Corporation and directed by Masato Harada. Many of the cast are members of the AKB48 idol girl group.

== Synopsis ==
Anzu Natsuno (Yuko Oshima), a student at an all-girl high school, hears a mysterious melody coming from the auditorium. There, she finds her classmate Kana (Atsuko Maeda) singing. Anzu's soon shocked when she sees Kana committing suicide after the song ends.

A few days later, Anzu is approached by magazine columnist Riku Nagase (Ryuhei Matsuda), who explains that he's investigating an urban legend of densen uta, or the infectious song, that turns whoever sings the song suicidal. Riku convinces Anzu and her friends to sing the song to see if there's any truth to the urban legend. They reluctantly agree and sing the song.

Over next few days the girls, one by one, kill themselves, leaving Anzu to fight for her life. Coming closer to the source of the song, Anzu finds out about an unimaginable secret relating to her past and the song.

== Marketing ==
The film deployed viral marketing ads where faux bathroom graffiti clues led to a haunted ghost selfie and a printed QR code that led to the movie's website.

== Cast ==
- Ryuhei Matsuda as Riku Nagase
- Yūsuke Iseya as Taichi
- Atsuko Maeda as Kana Takahashi
- Yuko Oshima as Apricot (Anzu) Natsuno
- Sayaka Akimoto as Shuri Matsuda
- Haruna Kojima as Kiriko
- Yoshino Kimura as Ranko Kaburagi
- Hiroshi Abe as Jake
- Minami Takahashi as Ai
- Minami Minegishi as Rumi Inoue
- Erena Ono as Sae Miyaguchi
- Tomomi Kasai as Asuka Kumoi
- Kayo Noro as Miki Oribe
- Sae Miyazawa as C-chan
- Michiru Hoshino as Michiko Goi
- Shoko Ikezu as Riki Nagase / Enma
- Satoru Matsuo as Otaku Soldier
- Yasunari Takeshima as Bazooka
- Toshihiro Yashiba as Shin'ya Kudô
- Yasuto Kosuda as Anzu's Father

== See also ==
- AKB48
- Gloomy Sunday
- Cinema of Japan
