= Minami Takahashi =

Japanese television personality and singer (born 1991)

- 高橋 みなみ
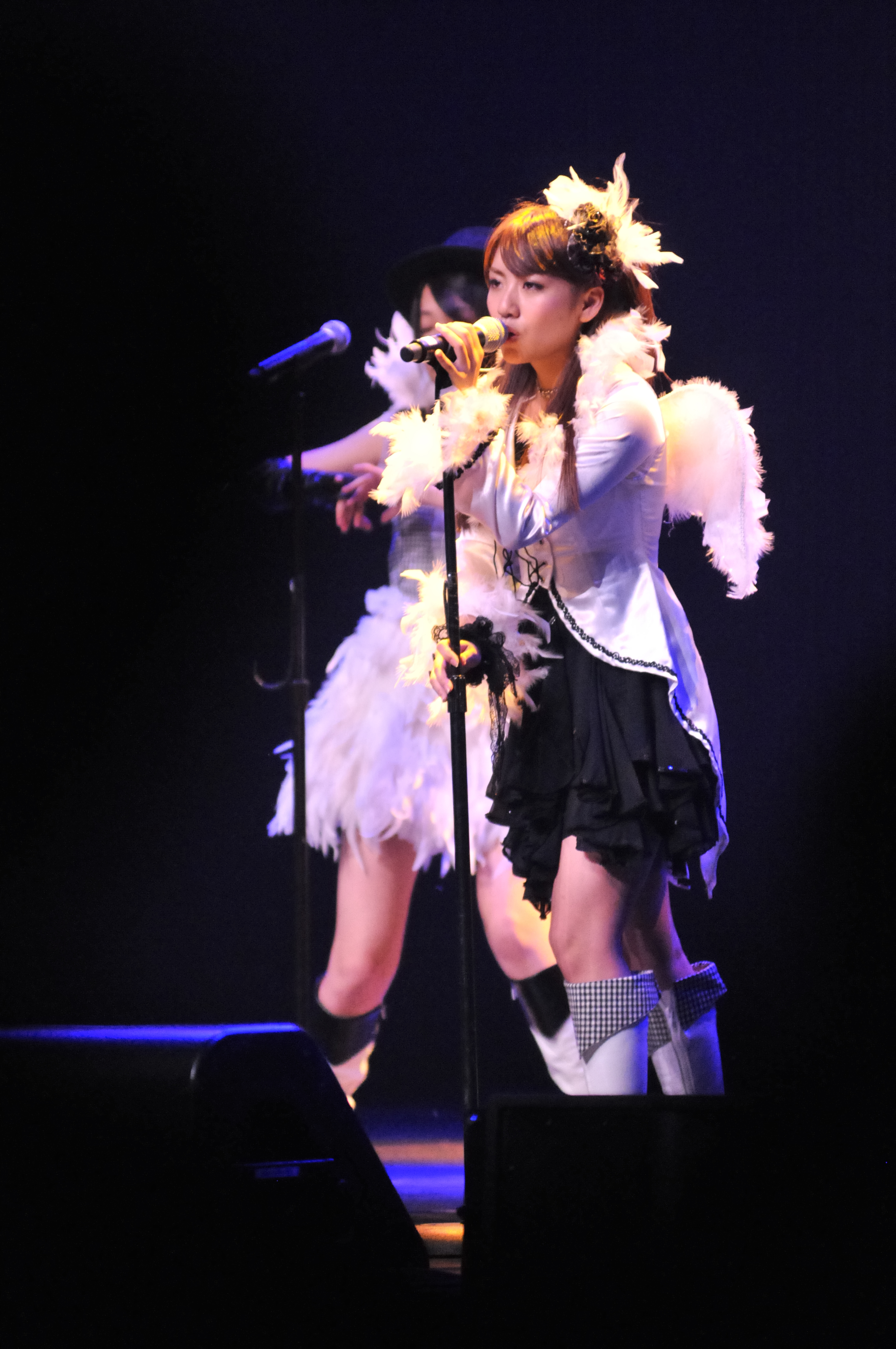
- Takahashi performing at the Anime Expo AKB48 live in 2010
- Born: 8 April 1991 (age 35); Hachiōji, Tokyo, Japan
- Other name: Takamina
- Occupations: Singer; idol (formerly); tarento
- Years active: 2005–present
- Agent(s): Production Ogi, Mama&Son
- Height: 148 cm (4 ft 10 in)
- Spouse: Unknown (m. 2019)
- Musical career
- Genre: J-pop
- Instrument: Vocals
- Labels: King/You, Be Cool! (AKB48); Epic (no3b); Nayutawave (solo)
- Member of: no3b
- Formerly of: AKB48

Minami Takahashi (高橋 みなみ, Takahashi Minami; born 8 April 1991) is a Japanese television personality and singer, best known as the first General Director (総監督, sōkantoku) of idol girl group AKB48 and its network of sister groups. Nicknamed Takamina (たかみな), she is also a member of the subgroup no3b alongside fellow AKB48 graduates Minami Minegishi and Haruna Kojima – all three are currently affiliated with Mama&Son Inc.

== Career ==
Takahashi was born in Hachiōji, Tokyo. In August 2005, she became one of the 30th HoriPro Talent Contest's 15 final candidates, but she did not win the competition's Grand-Prix prize. In October 2005, she participated in the first AKB48 audition and beat 7,924 other applicants to be chosen as one of the 24 founding members of the group. According to Tomonobu Togasaki, the manager of the AKB48 Theater, she had two unofficial advantages going for her, in that both her birthday (8 April; 1991-04-08) and her height (148 cm) contain the number "48". She debuted with Team A on 8 December 2005.

In 2008, no3b members, including Takahashi, appeared in the TV Tokyo drama Men Dol. She starred as Nami/Kai in this television series.

On 23 August 2009, Takahashi was officially announced as the captain of AKB48's Team A.

Three years later, on 24 August 2012, with Mariko Shinoda replacing her as the captain of Team A, Minami Takahashi was promoted to be the General Director of the entire AKB48 enterprise, including all sister groups.

Takahashi appears regularly in the AKB48 singles as one of the group's key singers. In addition, Minami frequently represents AKB48 on TV programs such as Music Station, and in other of the group's publicity events. She was also scheduled to take part in the AKB48's 3-day live concert event titled "Takamina ni tsuite ikimasu" (たかみなについて行きます; lit. "We will follow Takamina"), which was to have been held on 25–27 March 2011 at the Yokohama Arena but was cancelled due to the 2011 Tōhoku earthquake and tsunami.

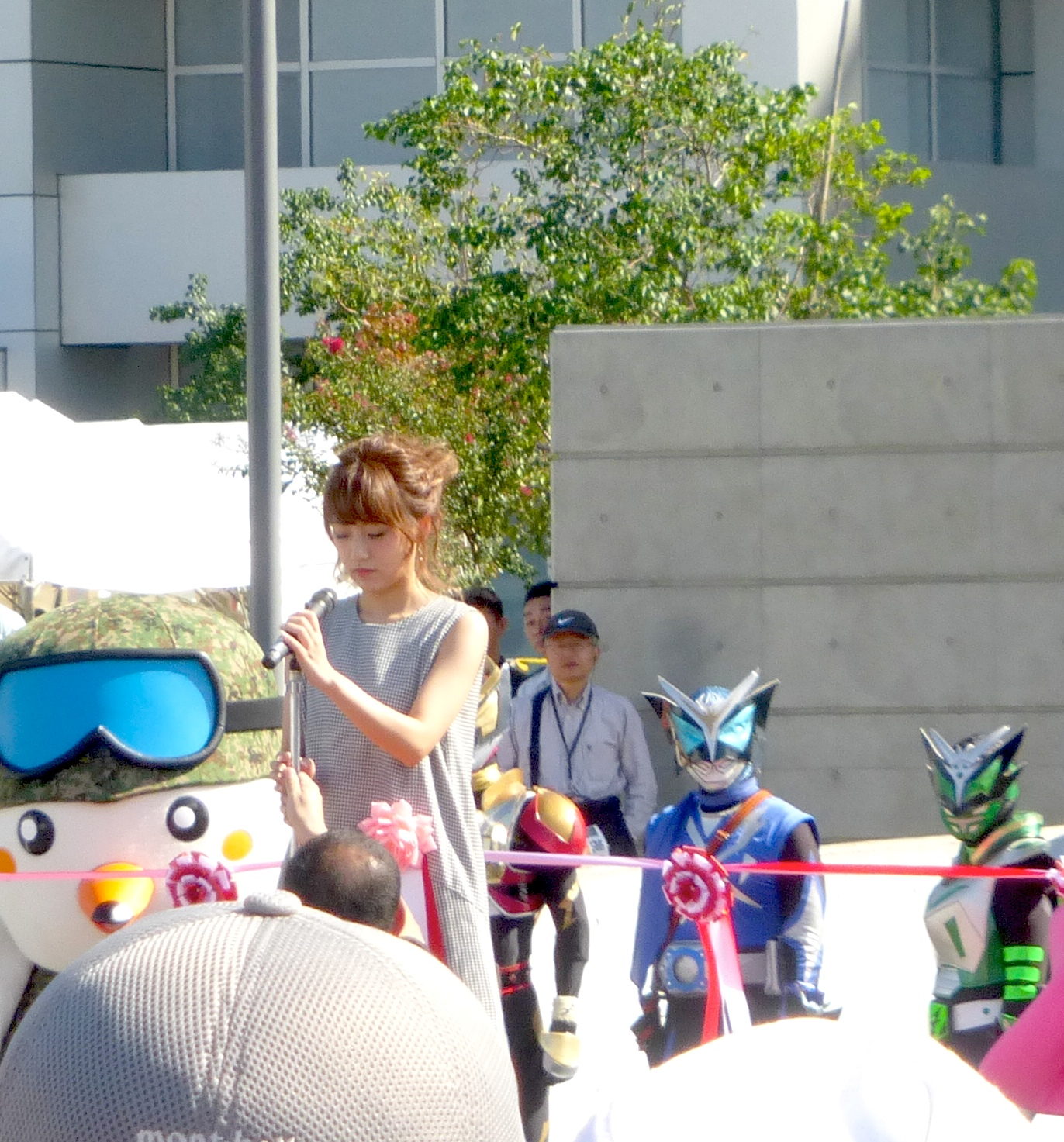
Minami Takahashi at the opening ceremony for the 4th annual Tokyo Detention House Exhibition, October 2015.

On 25 August 2012, the second day of AKB48 Tokyo Dome Concert, it was announced by Max Hole that Takahashi would make her solo debut with the company, through its Nayutawave Records label. The single, titled "Jane Doe", was released on 3 April 2013. It is the opening theme song for the Fuji Television TV drama Saki, which stars Yukie Nakama. She also released the single "Hito no Tobira" for the 2013 film The Smurfs 2 in which she provides the Japanese voice of Smurfette.

On 8 December 2014, the 9th Anniversary of AKB48 Theater, it was confirmed by Takahashi herself that she would officially leave AKB48 exactly one year later, or 8 December 2015, the 10th Anniversary of the AKB48 Theater. Yui Yokoyama will then succeed her job as the General Director of AKB48.

On 25 October 2015, during the handshake and autograph event at Pacific Yokohama had announced the details of AKB48's 42nd Single and Request Hour 2016. The 42nd Single will be released on 9 December 2015. She will be the Center which will be her final appearance on an AKB48 single.

On 26 to 27 March 2016, her graduation concert titled "Congratulation Takahashi Minami Graduation "148.5 cm Have Seen a Dream" in Yokohama Stadium" was held at Yokohama Stadium, with her last theater performance on 8 April 2016.

On 8 April 2017, Takahshi held her own birthday party titled "Minami Takahashi 26th Birthday Live 2017❤︎199104080127❤︎26❤︎" with the members of no3b reunited.

Since her graduation, Takahashi has been hosting her own radio show "Takahashi Minami no [Korekara Nanisuru?]" (Takahashi Minami's "What are you going to do now?") on Tokyo FM airing every Monday-Thursday at 1:00 p.m. to 2:55 pm, as well as having a solo singer career.

== Image ==
In an interview with Nippon Television in June 2010, AKB48 producer Yasushi Akimoto named Takahashi the "eldest daughter of the 48 sisters". She is also regarded as "soul of AKB", and her motto, "hard work will definitely be rewarded" (努力は必ず報われる, dōryoku wa kanarazu mukuwareru), has inspired many members of AKB48.

== Personal life ==
On 1 May 2019, Takahashi announced her marriage to a non-celebrity man 15 years her senior.

== AKB48 general elections ==
- Ranked 5th in the 2009 general election
- Ranked 6th in the 2010 general election
- Ranked 7th in the 2011 general election
- Ranked 6th in the 2012 general election
- Ranked 8th in the 2013 general election
- Ranked 9th in the 2014 general election
- Ranked 4th in the 2015 general election

== Discography ==
=== Solo singles ===
Year	Title	Chart position		Oricon sales	
Year	Title	Oricon Weekly Singles Chart	Billboard Japan Hot 100	First week	Total*
2013	"Jane Doe"	2	1	85,493	103,066
2017	"Kodoku wa Kizutsukanai"				

* Unofficial figure obtained by adding together Oricon sales numbers for different periods of time when the single charted on Oricon.

=== Solo albums ===
Year	Title	Chart position	
Year	Title	Oricon Weekly Singles Chart	Billboard Japan Hot 100
2016	"Aishi Te mo Ii Desu ka?" (愛してもいいですか?)	9	

=== Singles with AKB48 ===
Year	No.	Title	Role	Notes
2006	Ind-1	"Sakura no Hanabiratachi"	A-side, Center	
2006	Ind-2	"Skirt, Hirari"	A-side, Center	
2006	1	"Aitakatta"	A-side, Center	
2007	2	"Seifuku ga Jama o Suru"	A-side, Center	
2007	3	"Keibetsu Shiteita Aijō"	A-side, Center	
2007	4	"Bingo!"	A-side, Center	
2007	5	"Boku no Taiyō"	A-side	
2007	6	"Yūhi o Miteiru ka?"	A-side	
2008	7	"Romance, Irane"	A-side	
2008	8	"Sakura no Hanabiratachi 2008"	A-side, Center	
2008	9	"Baby! Baby! Baby!"	A-side	
2008	10	"Ōgoe Diamond"	A-side	
2009	11	"10nen Sakura"	A-side	Also sang on "Sakurairo no Sora no Shita de".
2009	12	"Namida Surprise!"	A-side	
2009	13	"Iiwake Maybe"	A-side	Ranked 5th in 2009 General Election
2009	14	"River"	A-side, Center	
2010	15	"Sakura no Shiori"	A-side	Also sang on "Majisuka Rock 'n' Roll".
2010	16	"Ponytail to Shushu"	A-side, Center	Also sang on "Majijo Teppen Blues"
2010	17	"Heavy Rotation"	A-side	Ranked 6th in 2010 General Election. Also sang on "Yasai Sisters" and "Lucky Seven".
2010	18	"Beginner"	A-side	
2010	19	"Chance no Junban"	B-side	Did not sing on title track; lineup was determined by rock-paper-scissors tournament. Sang on "Yoyakushita Christmas"; and "Kurumi to Dialogue" as Team A.
2011	20	"Sakura no Ki ni Narō"	A-side	
2011	–	"Dareka no Tame ni – What can I do for someone?"	–	charity single
2011	21	"Everyday, Katyusha"	A-side	Also sang on "Korekara Wonderland" and "Yankee Soul".
2011	22	"Flying Get"	A-side	Ranked 7th in 2011 General Election. Also sang on "Ice no Kuchizuke".
2011	23	"Kaze wa Fuiteiru"	A-side	
2011	24	"Ue kara Mariko"	B-side	Did not sing on title track; lineup was determined by rock-paper-scissors tournament; She sang on "Noël no Yoru"; and on "Rinjin wa Kizutsukanai" as Team A.
2012	25	"Give Me Five!"	A-side (Baby Blossom), Selection 6	Played lead guitar in Baby Blossom; She also sang "Sweet & Bitter" as part of Selection 6.
2012	26	"Manatsu no Sounds Good!"	A-side	Also sang on "Chōdai, Darling!".
2012	27	"Gingham Check"	A-side	Ranked 6th in 2012 General Election. Also sang on "Yume no Kawa".
2012	28	"Uza"	A-side	Also sang on "Kodoku na Hoshizora" as New Team A.
2012	29	"Eien Pressure"	B-side	Did not sing on title track; lineup was determined by rock-paper-scissors tournament. Sang on "Totteoki Christmas".
2013	30	"So Long!"	A-side	Sang on "Ruby" as Team A.
2013	–	"Tenohira ga Kataru Koto"	–	charity single
2013	31	"Sayonara Crawl"	A-side	
2013	32	"Koi Suru Fortune Cookie"	A-side	Ranked 8th in 2013 General Election.
2013	33	"Heart Electric"	A-side	Nicknamed Linda. She also sang "Kiss made Countdown" as Team A.
2013	34	"Suzukake no Ki no Michi de "Kimi no Hohoemi o Yume ni Miru" to Itte Shimattara Bokutachi no Kankei wa Dō Kawatte Shimau no ka, Bokunari ni Nan-nichi ka Kangaeta Ue de no Yaya Kihazukashii Ketsuron no Yō na Mono"	B-side	Did not sing on title track; lineup was determined by rock-paper-scissors tournament. Sang on "Mosh & Dive" and "Party is over".
2014	35	"Mae Shika Mukanee"	A-side	
2014	36	"Labrador Retriever"	A-side	
2014	37	Kokoro no Placard	A-side	Ranked 9th in 2014 General Election.
2014	38	"Kibouteki Refrain"	A-side	
2015	39	"Green Flash"	A-side	Raps in this song with Sayaka Yamamoto. Also sang "Majisuka Fight", "Haru no Hikari Chikadzuita Natsu" and "Hakimono to Kasa no Monogatari".
2015	40	"Bokutachi wa Tatakawanai"	A-side	Also sang "Deai no Hi, Wakare no Hi" & "Kimi no Dai Ni Shō" & "Barebare Bushi"
2015	41	"Halloween Night"	A-side	Ranked 4th in 2015 General Election. Also sang "Ippome Ondo" "Yankee Machine Gun" & "Gunzou"
2015	42	"Kuchibiru ni Be My Baby"	A-side, Center	Also sang "365 Nichi no Kamihikōki", "Yasashii Place" and "Senaka Kotoba" which is her graduation song.
2016	43	"Kimi wa Melody"	A-side	Marked as a 10th Anniversary single.

=== Albums with AKB48 ===
- Set List: Greatest Songs 2006–2007
- Kamikyokutachi
- Set List: Greatest Songs Kanzenban
- Koko ni Ita Koto
- 1830m
- Tsugi no Ashiato
- Koko ga Rhodes da, Koko de Tobe!
- 0 to 1 no Aida

== Stage units ==
Team A 1st Stage: Party ga Hajimaru yo

4. Skirt, Hirari
8. Hoshi no Ondo (2nd Unit)

Team A 2nd Stage: Aitakatta

1. Nageki no Figure
5. Glass no I Love You
7. Senaka Kara Dakishimete
8. Rio no Kakumei

Team A 3rd Stage: Dareka no Tame ni

4. Bird
8. Seifuku ga Jama o Suru

Team A 4th Stage: Tadaima Renaichuu

6. Junai no Crescendo

Team A 5th Stage: Renai Kinshi Jōrei

7. Renai Kinshi Jourei (Takahashi Team A 1 version)
8. Tsundere! (Takahashi Team A 2 version)

Team A 6th Stage: Mokugekisha

7. Itoshisa no Accel

Team A Waiting Stage

9. Ame no Pianist (original unit)
4. Kioku no Dilemma (new unit)

Himawari-gumi 1st Stage: Boku no Taiyō

7. Higurashi no Koi

Himawari-gumi 2nd Stage: Yume o Shinaseru Wake ni Ikanai

5. Bye Bye Bye

Team Surprise 1st Stage:

6. 1994-nen no Raimei
8. Oteage Lullaby
14. Dessan

Team Surprise 2nd Stage:

3. Yume wo miru nara
7. Hell or Heaven

== Filmography ==
=== Movies ===
Year	Title	Role
2007	Densen Uta	Ai-chan (愛ちゃん)
2011	Documentary of AKB48: To Be Continued	Herself
2012	Documentary of AKB48: Show Must Go On	Herself
2013	Documentary of AKB48: No Flower Without Rain	Herself
2014	Documentary of AKB48: The Time Has Come	Herself
2015	Attack on Titan	Scout Soldier

=== Dramas ===
Year	Title	Role
2006	Densha Otoko Deluxe	Herself
2008	Saito-san (斉藤さん)	Kei Niimi
2008	Men☆Dol: Ikemen Idol (メン☆ドル 〜イケメンアイドル〜)	Nami/Kai
2010	Majisuka Gakuen	Minami Ono
2010	Honto ni Atta Kowai Hanashi (ほんとにあった怖い話 夏の特別編2010 AKB48まるごと浄霊スペシャル2)	Herself
2010	Sakura Kara no Tegami (桜からの手紙 〜AKB48 それぞれの卒業物語〜)	Minami Takahashi
2011	Majisuka Gakuen 2	Female Investigator
2015	Majisuka Gakuen 4	Minami
2015	Majisuka Gakuen 5	Minami
2016	AKB Horror Night: Adrenaline's Night (AKBホラーナイト アドレナリンの夜)	Hitomi (Ep.25 – 8)

=== Video games ===
Year	Title	Role
2019	Grimms Notes	Hahn

=== Animation ===
Year	Title	Role
2019	Beyblade Burst GT	Ichika Kindō

=== Musicals ===
Year	Title	Role
2009	AKB48 Kagekidan "Infinity" (AKB歌劇団「∞・Infinity」)	MC

=== Solo Concerts ===
Year	Title !
2015	Takahashi Minami Mirai he Kekki Shuukai~ Subete no Koto no Zenya~
2016	Takahashi Minami 独立宣言 (Dokuritsu Sengen/ Declaration of Independence)
2016	Takahashi Minami PREMIUM SHOWCASE LIVE＠COTTON CLUB
2016	Takahashi Minami "Aishi Te mo Ii Desu ka?" (愛してもいいですか?)
2016	Takahashi Minami 2016 New Year Eve Countdown Concert in Hachioji City, Tokyo
2017	Takahashi Minami 26th Birthday Live 2017 ❤ 199104080127❤ 26❤
2017	Takahashi Minami 2017 National Live House Tour – We will follow Takamina reborn

=== Solo Events ===
Year	Title	Role
2016/04	Girls Award 2016 Spring/ Summer	MC
2016/04	NHK Kayo Charity Project	MC
2016/06	Huis Ten Bosch Music Fes	Artist
2016/06	Cheeky eyes Travel vol.1 in Okinawa	
2015/06	Leader DIVE! ~Supporting the people meeting the challenges of a new career	Guest
2016/08	Ultra Teen Fes	MC – Kore nani
2016/09	Rock Corps supported by JT	Ambassador
2016/10	Girls Award 2016 Autumn/ Winter	MC
2016/10	OTONOKO	Artist
2016/12	Act Against AIDS (The Variety 24)	Artist
2017/01	Governor Koike's 1st Tokyo Future Vision Roundtable Meeting	Guest
2017/03	Laguana Music Fes. 2017	Artist
2017/04	Governor Koike's 2nd Tokyo Future Vision Roundtable Meeting	Guest
2017/05	Governor Koike's 3rd Tokyo Future Vision Roundtable Meeting	Guest
2017/06	Cheeky eyes Travel vol.2 in Kyoto Amanohashidate	
2017/07	Shitte, Hepatitis Project (Save the Life 2017)	Special Supporter
2017/08	Governor Koike's 4th Tokyo Future Vision Roundtable Meeting	Guest
2017/09	Governor Koike's 5th Tokyo Future Vision Roundtable Meeting	Guest
2017/09	Rock Corps supported by JT	Ambassador & Artist
2017/10	Toyama College of University Festival LIVE	Artist
2017/11	2017 LIVE FOR LIFE「音楽彩	Artist
2017/11	11th Asian International Children's Film Festival	
2017/12	Griffin's 4th Junon produce Girl Contest	MC

=== Radio ===
Year	Title	Role
2009–2016	No Sleeves no Shukan No Sleeves (ノースリーブスの週刊ノースリー部)	MC
2016 –	Takahashi Minami no Kore Kara Nani Suru? (高橋みなみの『これから、何する？』)	MC
2017 –	Takahashi Minami and Asai Ryo Yobunnokoto (高橋みなみと朝井リョウ ヨブンのこと)	MC

=== Television programs ===
Year	Title	Role
2008	AKB 1ji 59fun! (AKB1じ59ふん!)	Herself
2008	AKB 0ji 59fun! (AKB0じ59ふん!)	Herself
2008–2016	AKBingo!	Herself
2008–2010, 2014–2015	AKB48 Nemousu TV (AKB48ネ申テレビ)	Herself
2009	Omoikkiri Don! 1155 (おもいッきりDON! 1155)	Herself
2009–2010	Omoikkiri Pon! (おもいッきりPON!)	Herself
2009–2012	Shūkan AKB (週刊AKB)	Herself
2010–2011	Pon!	no3b
2010	AKB600sec.	Herself
2010–	Mujack!	Herself (MC)
2010–2016	AKB to ××! (AKBと××!)	Herself
2011	Documentary of AKB48 – The future 1mm ahead	Self (concurrently as a narrator)
2011–2014	Shin Dōmoto Kyōdai (新堂本兄弟)	Herself
2012–2014	AKB Kousagi Dojo (AKB子兎道場)	Herself
2012–2013	Snack Kissa Eden (スナック喫茶エデン)	Herself (MC)
2013–	Ijime wo Knock Out (いじめをノックアウト)	Herself (MC)
2014–2018	Mirai Monster (ミライ☆モンスター)	Herself (MC)
2016–2017	DAM Channel (DAMチャンネル)	Herself (MC)
2016–	Sekai no mura de hakken! Konna tokoro ni nihonjin (世界の村で発見!こんなところに日本人)	Herself
2017–2018	Ichikara (金曜イチから)	Herself (MC)

== Other media ==
=== Essays ===
- リーダー論 (22 December 2015, Kobunsha)

=== Photobooks ===
- B.L.T. U-17 summer (7 August 2008, Tokyo News Tsushinsha)
- たかみな (22 September 2010, Kodansha)
- 写りな、写りな (24 February 2016, Kobunsha)

=== Calendar ===
- たかみな日めくり 努力は必ず報われる (1 November 2016, PHP)
