= Kibōteki Refrain =

- Type A Limited Edition Cover

Single by AKB48

from the album Koko ga Rhodes da, Koko de Tobe!
- B-side: "Ima, Happy"; "Ambulance"; "Utaitai"; "Seifuku no Hane"; "Kaze no Rasen"
- Released: November 26, 2014
- Genre: J-pop
- Length: 4:52
- Label: You, Be Cool! / King
- Songwriter: Yasushi Akimoto (lyrics)

AKB48 singles chronology
| "Kokoro no Placard" (2014) | "Kibōteki Refrain" (2014) | "Green Flash" (2015) |

Music video
- AKB48 "Kibōteki Refrain" Original version Edited version

"Kibōteki Refrain" (希望的リフレイン, Kibōteki Rifurein; also "Kibouteki Refrain", lit. Hopeful Refrain) is the 38th single by the Japanese idol girl group AKB48. The personnel that were chosen to sing in the song was revealed during the group's fifth rock-paper-scissors tournament. The song premiered during All Star Kanshasai 2014 on TV channel TBS. It was released in Japan on November 26, 2014. It was the second best-selling single of the year in Japan, with 1,156,706 copies.

In 2022, an edited version of this song performed by Yumi Chung, Chantel Yiu, Aska Cheung and Archie Sin from Hong Kong, used for saying no to drugs.

On 29 October 2023 Thai version of "Kibōteki Refrain" has been sung by the combination members of BNK48 and CGM48.

== Production ==
Mayu Watanabe and Sakura Miyawaki are the center performers for this song. This is Watanabe's third consecutive single in which she served as a center performer. This is also the first time where HKT48 Member was chosen as the center for AKB48 Single (in this case, Sakura Miyawaki, who is also a concurrent member of AKB48 Team A) The title track uses 32 members, including A-side debuts for Ryoka Oshima, Saya Kawamoto, NMB48's Miru Shiroma, Ikumi Nakano, Mion Mukaichi, Tomu Muto and Madoka Moriyasu. The music video includes guest appearances by AKB48 alumni Tomomi Itano, Yuko Oshima, Mariko Shinoda and Atsuko Maeda.

Several of the single's supporting tracks were originally promoted as music videos on the group's album Koko ga Rhodes da, Koko de Tobe!. They include "Juujun na Slave" (従順なSlave), "Hajimete no Drive" (初めてのドライブ), "Loneliness Club" (ロンリネスクラブ), "Me wo Aketa Mama no First Kiss" (目を開けたままのファーストキス), and "Reborn".

== Track list ==
=== Type A ===
All lyrics are written by Yasushi Akimoto.

CD: KIZM-311, KIZM-90311
| No. | Title | Music | Performing units | Length |
|---|---|---|---|---|
| 1. | "Kiboteki Refrain" (希望的リフレイン) | Yoshimasa Inoue | | 4:53 |
| 2. | "Ima, Happy" (今、Happy, "Happy Now") | Ayrton Sena (composer); Yuichi "Masa" Nonaka (arranger) | Baragumi (Rose Group) | 3:20 |
| 3. | "Juujun na Slave" (君従順なSlave, "Obedient Slave") | REO | Team A | 3:56 |
| 4. | "Kiboteki Refrain" (off vocal ver.) |
| 5. | "Ima, Happy" (off vocal ver.) |
| 6. | "Juujun na Slave" (off vocal ver.) |

DVD: KIZM-312, KIZM-90312
| No. | Title | Director | Length |
|---|---|---|---|
| 1. | "Kiboteki Refrain Music Video" (希望的リフレイン Music Video) | Hideyuki Tanaka |
| 2. | "Kiboteki Refrain Music Video -Live Ver.-" (希望的リフレイン Music Video -Live Ver.-) |
| 3. | "Ima, Happy Music Video" (今、Happy Music Video) |
| 4. | "AKB48 Group Backstage Janken Tournament 2014 Weakest Queen Match Part 1" (AKB48グループ 裏じゃんけん大会2014 最弱女王決定戦 Part1) |

=== Type B ===
All lyrics are written by Yasushi Akimoto.

CD: KIZM-313, KIZM-90313
| No. | Title | Music | Performing units | Length |
|---|---|---|---|---|
| 1. | "Kiboteki Refrain" (希望的リフレイン) | Yoshimasa Inoue | | 4:53 |
| 2. | "Ambulance" | Kohshun Maemura | Yurigumi (Lily Group) | 4:08 |
| 3. | "Hajimete no Drive" (初めてのドライブ) | | Team K | 4:36 |
| 4. | "Kiboteki Refrain" (off vocal ver.) |
| 5. | "Ambulance" (off vocal ver.) |
| 6. | "Hajimete no Drive" (off vocal ver.) |

DVD: KIZM-314, KIZM-90314
| No. | Title | Director | Length |
|---|---|---|---|
| 1. | "Kiboteki Refrain Music Video" (希望的リフレイン Music Video) | Hideyuki Tanaka |
| 2. | "Kiboteki Refrain Music Video -Live Ver.-" (希望的リフレイン Music Video -Live Ver.-) |
| 3. | "Ambulance Music Video" |
| 4. | "AKB48 Group Backstage Janken Tournament 2014 Weakest Queen Match Part 2" (AKB48グループ 裏じゃんけん大会2014 最弱女王決定戦Part2) |

=== Type C ===
All lyrics are written by Yasushi Akimoto.

CD: KIZM-315, KIZM-90315
| No. | Title | Music | Performing units | Length |
|---|---|---|---|---|
| 1. | "Kiboteki Refrain" (希望的リフレイン) | Yoshimasa Inoue | | 4:53 |
| 2. | "Utaitai" (歌いたい, "Wanna Sing") | ANDW_EYE (composer); Hiroshi Sasaki (arranger) | Katareagumi (Cattleya Group) | 5:43 |
| 3. | "Loneliness Club" (ロンリネスクラブ) | | Team B | 5:01 |
| 4. | "Kiboteki Refrain" (off vocal ver.) |
| 5. | "Utaitai" (off vocal ver.) |
| 6. | "Loneliness Club" (off vocal ver.) |

DVD: KIZM-316, KIZM-90316
| No. | Title | Director | Length |
|---|---|---|---|
| 1. | "Kiboteki Refrain Music Video" (希望的リフレイン Music Video) | Hideyuki Tanaka |
| 2. | "Kiboteki Refrain Music Video -Live Ver.-" (希望的リフレイン Music Video -Live Ver.-) |
| 3. | "Utaitai Music Video" (歌いたい Music Video) |
| 4. | "Team 8 first heart throbbing one-shot close up" (Team 8は・じ・め・て・のドキドキワンショットリップ集！) |

=== Type D ===
All lyrics are written by Yasushi Akimoto.

CD: KIZM-317, KIZM-90317
| No. | Title | Music | Performing units | Length |
|---|---|---|---|---|
| 1. | "Kiboteki Refrain" (希望的リフレイン) | Yoshimasa Inoue | | 4:53 |
| 2. | "Seifuku no Hane" (制服の羽根, "Wings on Your Uniform") | Makoto Wakatabe | Team 8 | 4:09 |
| 3. | "Me wo Akete Mama no First Kiss" (目を開けたままのファーストキス) | | Team 4 | 3:46 |
| 4. | "Kaze no Rasen" (風の螺旋, "Spiral of the Wind") | Shutaro Katagiri (composer); Makoto Wakatabe (arranger) | Kojizaka46 | 4:36 |
| 5. | "Kiboteki Refrain" (off vocal ver.) |
| 6. | "Seifuku no Hane" (off vocal ver.) |
| 7. | "Me wo Akete Mama no First Kiss" (off vocal ver.) |
| 8. | "Kaze no Rasen" (off vocal ver.) |

DVD: KIZM-318, KIZM-90318
| No. | Title | Director | Length |
|---|---|---|---|
| 1. | "Kiboteki Refrain Music Video" (希望的リフレイン Music Video) | Hideyuki Tanaka |
| 2. | "Kiboteki Refrain Music Video -Live Ver.-" (希望的リフレイン Music Video -Live Ver.-) |
| 3. | "Seifuku no Hane Music Video" (制服の羽根 Music Video) |
| 4. | "Kaze no Rasen Music Video" (風の螺旋 Music Video) |

=== Theater edition ===
All lyrics are written by Yasushi Akimoto.

CD: NMAX-1181
| No. | Title | Music | Performing units | Length |
|---|---|---|---|---|
| 1. | "Kiboteki Refrain" (希望的リフレイン) | Yoshimasa Inoue | | 4:53 |
| 2. | "Ima, Happy" (今、Happy) | | Baragumi | 3:20 |
| 3. | "Reborn" | Shunryu | Team Surprise |
| 4. | "Kiboteki Refrain" (off vocal ver.) |
| 5. | "Ima, Happy" (off vocal ver.) |
| 6. | "Reborn" (off vocal ver.) |

== Personnel ==
One-shot units "Baragumi", "Yurigumi" and "Katareagumi" were created for some of the tracks on the different single types.

=== "Kiboteki Refrain" ===
The center performers are Mayu Watanabe and Sakura Miyawaki. There are 32 performers for this single:

- AKB48 Team A：Anna Iriyama, Rina Kawaei, Haruna Kojima, Haruka Shimazaki, Minami Takahashi, Tomu Muto
- AKB48 Team K：Mako Kojima, Yui Yokoyama, Yūka Tano
- AKB48 Team B：Nana Owada, Ryoka Oshima, Saya Kawamoto, Juri Takahashi, Mayu Watanabe
- AKB48 Team B / NMB48 Team N：Yuki Kashiwagi
- AKB48 Team 4：Rena Kato, Yuria Kizaki, Minami Minegishi, Mion Mukaichi
- AKB48 Team 8 (Tottori prefecture)：Ikumi Nakano
- SKE48 Team S / AKB48 Team K：Jurina Matsui
- SKE48 Team S / SNH48 Team SII：Sae Miyazawa
- SKE48 Team E：Akari Suda
- SKE48 Team E / Nogizaka 46：Rena Matsui
- NMB48 Team N / AKB48 Team K：Sayaka Yamamoto
- NMB48 Team M：Miru Shiroma
- NMB48 Team BII / SKE48 Team S：Miyuki Watanabe
- HKT48 Team H：Rino Sashihara
- HKT48 Team H / AKB48 Team K：Haruka Kodama
- HKT48 Team KIV：Madoka Moriyasu
- HKT48 Team KIV/ AKB48 Team A：Sakura Miyawaki
- Nogizaka 46 / AKB48 Team B：Rina Ikoma

=== "Ima, Happy" ===
Performed by Baragumi (Rose Group). The single has double center performers Nana Okada and Nagisa Sakaguchi.

The performers are: Yuna Ego, Yuuri Ota, Nana Okada, Ryoha Kitagawa, Moe Goto, Nagisa Sakaguchi, Nagisa Shibuya, Meru Tashima, Makiho Tatsuya, Miku Tanaka, Mio Tomonaga, Miki Nishino, Seina Fukuoka, Yuiri Murayama, Nako Yabuki, Shu Yabushita.

=== "Ambulance" ===
Performed by Yurigumi (Lily Group). The single's center performer is Sumire Sato.

The performers are: Rion Azuma, Chihiro Anai, Saho Iwatate, Natsuki Uchiyama, Haruna Kinoshita, Yui Kojina, Yukari Sasaki, Sumire Sato, Ayana Shinozaki, Mizuki Tsuchiyasu, Mariya Nagao, Reina Fujie, Nao Furuhata, Natsumi Matsuoka, Fuuko Yagura, and Akari Yoshida.

=== "Utaitai" ===
Performed by Katareagumi (Cattleya Group). The single's center performer is Aya Shibata.

The performers are: Haruka Ishida, Miori Ichikawa, Misaki Iwasa, Karen Iwata, Ayaka Umeda, Aika Ota, Mina Oba, Shizuka Ōya, Mayu Ogasawara, Rie Kitahara, Kanon Kimoto, Asuka Kuramochi, Riho Kotani, Aya Shibata, Kei Jonishi, Aki Takajo, Akane Takayanagi, Miku Tanabe, Marika Tani, Chiyori Nakanishi, Airi Furukawa, Kaori Matsumura, Miho Miyazaki, Aoi Motomura, Suzuran Yamauchi, Nana Yamada.

=== "Kaze no Rasen" ===
Performed by Kojizaka46, which consisted of Haruna Kojima of AKB48 and members of Nogizaka46: Rina Ikoma (also AKB48 Team B), Junna Ito, Hina Kawago, Mahiro Kawamura, Yuuri Saito, Iori Sagara, Kotoko Sasaki, Ayane Suzuki, Ranze Terada, Kana Nakada, Seira Nagashima, Ami Noujo, Rena Yamazaki, Miria Watanabe, and Maaya Wada.

== Chart performance ==
According to Oricon, the CD single sold 1,130,312 copies in the first week. It debuted at the first position on the Oricon Singles Album Chart. In the Billboard Japan Hot 100, the title song also placed first. On Oricon's year-end chart, it finished second overall, with 1,156,706 copies.

| Chart (2014) | Peak position |
|---|---|
| Billboard Japan Hot 100 | 1 |
| Oricon Daily Singles Chart | 1 |
| Oricon Weekly Singles Chart | 1 |

== Notes ==
Release references

Other references
