= Mako Kojima =

Japanese singer

- 小嶋 真子
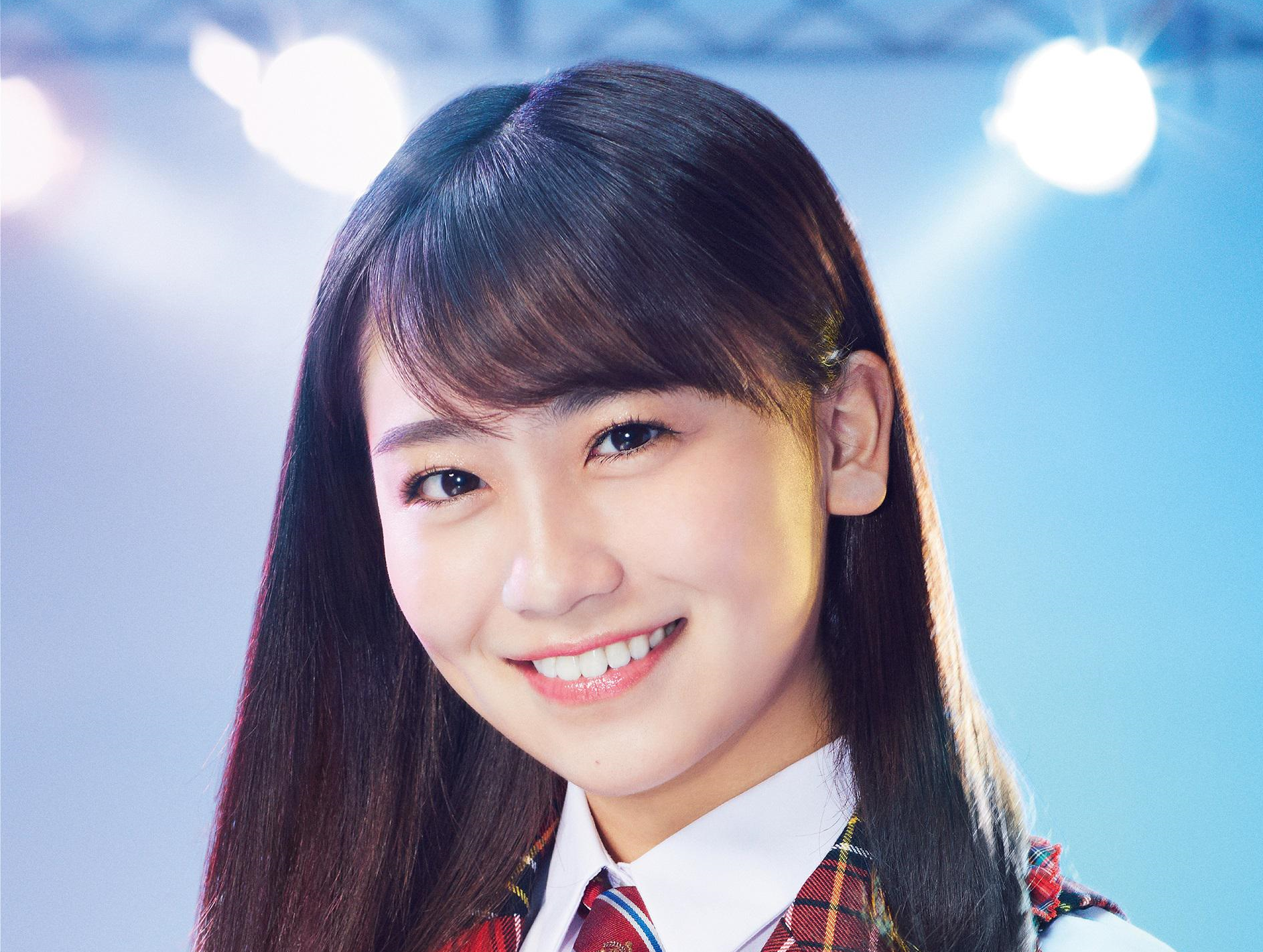
- Born: 30 May 1997 (age 29); Tokyo Prefecture, Japan
- Occupations: Fashion producer; tarento; YouTuber
- Years active: 2012–present
- Agent: Sun Music Production
- Spouse: Yūya Kido (m. 2024)
- Musical career
- Genres: J-pop
- Instrument: Vocals
- Years active: 2012–2019

YouTube information
- Channel: makochannel
- Years active: 2019–present
- Genres: vlog; fashion; music
- Subscribers: 130 thousand
- Views: 7.27 million
- Last updated: August 3rd, 2026
- Website: Mako Kojima Official Fanclub

Mako Kojima (小嶋 真子, Kojima Mako; born 30 May 1997 in Tokyo Prefecture) is a Japanese fashion producer and tarento, represented by Sun Music Production. She is a former member of the Japanese idol girl group AKB48 and the founder of the fashion label Haluhiroine, which is distributed through Earth Music & Ecology.

== Career ==
Kojima passed AKB48's 14th generation auditions in 2012. On July 20, Kojima was announced to be in a new sub-unit, Tentoumu Chu!, consisting of trainee members from AKB48 and its sister groups, together with Nana Okada, Miki Nishino, Ryoha Kitagawa, Nagisa Shibuya, Meru Tashima and Mio Tomonaga. The sub-unit debuted on July 31. Kojima, Okada, and Nishino, also known as the Three Musketeers (三銃士, Sanjūshi), were promoted to AKB48's Team 4 on August 24. She was selected to perform in a single title song for the first time for the song "Mae Shika Mukanee" (2014). She was shuffled to Team K during AKB48's Daisosaku Matsuri.

On April 6, 2017, Kojima transferred talent agencies from AKS, which managed AKB48 and most of its members, to Sun Music Production. She participated in the reality show Produce 48 in 2018, but was eliminated in episode 8, finishing in 34th place.

On January 12, 2019, Kojima announced her graduation from AKB48 during a Team K concert at Tokyo Dome City Hall. On April 27, her graduation ceremony was held during the AKB48 Group Spring LIVE Festival in Yokohama Stadium. On May 12, her final performance was held at the AKB48 Theater. Her YouTube channel, the makochannel (まこちゃんねる), was launched shortly after. She also announced the launch of her own clothing brand, haluhiroine (ハルヒロイン), which name is a combination of the Finnish word for "desire" (halu) and the English word "heroine".

== Personal life ==
On January 6, 2024, Kojima announced her marriage to actor Yūya Kido (木戸邑弥).

== Discography ==
=== AKB48 singles ===
Year	No.	Title	Role	Notes
2012	28	"UZA"	B-side	Sang 'Otona e no Michi' together with the trainee members.
2012	29	"Eien Pressure"	B-side	Sang 'Watashitachi no Reason'.
2013	30	"So long!"	B-side	Sang 'Tsuyoi Hana' together with the trainee members.
2013	31	"Sayonara Crawl"	B-side, Undergirls	Sang 'Bara no Kajitsu'.
2013	32	"Koi Suru Fortune Cookie"	B-side, Center	Sang 'Aozora Cafe'.
2013	33	"Heart Electric"	B-side, center	Sang 'Kimi dake ni Chu! Chu! Chu!' with the Tentoumu Chu! and 'Seijun Philosophy' as Team 4.
2013	34	"Suzukake no Ki no Michi de "Kimi no Hohoemi o Yume ni Miru" to Itte Shimattara Bokutachi no Kankei wa Dō Kawatte Shimau no ka, Bokunari ni Nannichi ka Kangaeta Ue de no Yaya Kihazukashii Ketsuron no Yō na Mono"	B-side	Sang 'Party is Over' as part of AKB48 and 'Erande Rainbow' as part of Tentoumu Chu!.
2014	35	"Mae Shika Mukanee"	A-side	First A-side.
2014	36	"Labrador Retriever"	A-side	Also sang 'Kyou made no Meldoy' and 'Itoshiki Rival' as part of Team K.
2014	37	"Kokoro no Placard"	B-side, Next Girls	Sang 'Hito Natsu no Hankouki' as part of Next Girls and 'Oshiete Mommy'.
2014	38	"Kibouteki Refrain"	A-side	Also sang 'Hajimete no Drive' as part of Team K.
2015	39	"Green Flash"	A-side	Also sang 'Haru no Hikari Chikadzuita Natsu'. Sang on 'Yankee Rock'.

=== AKB48 Albums ===
- Tsugi no Ashiato
  - Team Zaka
  - Smile Kamikakushi
- Koko ga Rhodes da, Koko de Tobe!
  - Conveyor
  - Bokutachi no Ideology

== Appearances ==
=== Stage units ===
AKB48 Kenkyusei Stage "Boku no Taiyou" (僕の太陽)

1. "Idol Nante Yobanaide" (アイドルなんて呼ばないで)
2. "Boku to Juliet to Jet Coaster" (僕とジュリエットとジェットコースター)
3. "Himawari" (向日葵)

AKB48 Kenkyusei Stage "Pajama Drive" (パジャマドライブ)

1. "Tenshi no Shippo" (天使のしっぽ)
2. "Kagami no Naka no Jean Da Arc" (鏡の中のジャンヌ・ダルク)

Team 4 2nd Stage "Te wo Tsunaginagara" (手をつなぎながら)

1. "Wimbledon e tsureteitte" (ウィンブルドンへ連れて行って)

Team K "RESET" (Revival)

1. "Kokoro no Hashi no Sofa" (心の端のソフャー)

=== TV variety ===
- AKBingo! (2013–2018)
- Tentoumu Chu! no Sekai o Muchuu ni Sasemasu Sengen (てんとうむChu!の世界をムチューにさせます宣言！) (2014)

=== TV dramas ===
- Joshikou Keisatsu (女子高警察) (2013)
- Majisuka Gakuen 4 (マジすか学園4) (2015), Kamisori
