= Saya Kawamoto =

Japanese tarento and actress (born 1998)

- 川本 紗矢
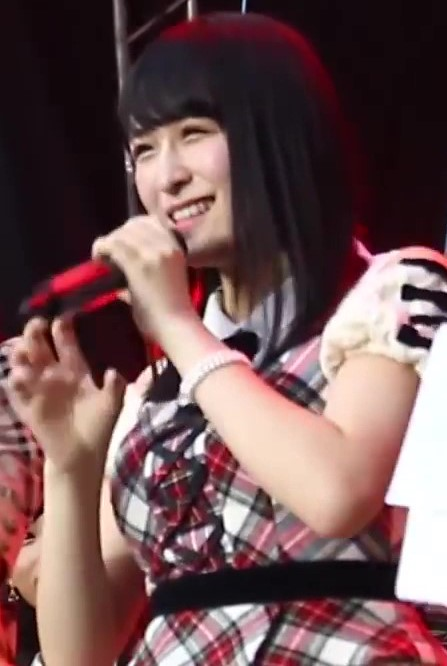
- Kawamoto in 2018
- Born: August 31, 1998 (age 27); Betsukai, Nemuro Subprefecture, Hokkaido, Japan
- Other name: Sayaya
- Occupations: Tarento, actress
- Years active: 2013–present
- Agent: Sophie Promotion
- Height: 1.57 m (5 ft 2 in)
- Musical career
- Genres: J-pop; Indo pop
- Instrument: Vocals
- Years active: 2013–2020
- Formerly of: AKB48 (2013-2020); JKT48 (2018)

Saya Kawamoto (川本 紗矢, Kawamoto Saya; born 31 August 1998) is a Japanese tarento and actress. She is a former member of the Japanese idol girl group AKB48. She was a member of AKB48's Team 4 and was in JKT48's Team T due to a member exchange program that happened between 15 September and 19 October 2018.

== Biography ==
=== Pre-AKB48 ===
Kawamoto was born in Betsukai, Hokkaido on 31 August 1998. She is a big fan of Haruka Shimazaki. Before Shimazaki, Kawamoto admired Atsuko Maeda. When Kawamoto applied for the AKB48 Group Draft Kaigi, she admired Mako Kojima.

=== AKB48 career ===
Kawamoto debuted on 22 September 2013 at the first AKB48 Group Draft Kaigi. During the Draft on 10 November, Kawamoto was picked to join AKB48's Team B. SKE48's Team S, SKE48's Team KII, SKE48's Team E and HKT48's Team H. Through lottery, it was decided that Kawamoto would join AKB48's Team B. She later admitted it was the team she wanted to join the most.

Kawamoto debuted in AKB48 Team B's stage on 7 March 2014, performing "Avocado Janeshi".

On 26 March 2015, it was announced that she would be transferred to AKB48's Team 4.

In September 2018, Kawamoto participated in a month-long member exchange program with JKT48, during which she transferred to JKT48 Team T and lived in Jakarta, while JKT48 member Stephanie Pricilla Indarto Putri and Pimrapat "Mobile" Phadungwatanachok of BNK48 became members of AKB48.

On 6 July 2020, during an episode of AKB48 / OUC48 YouTube program Project 48, Kawamoto announced her graduation from AKB48 by the end of August. Her graduation concert, "Saya Kawamoto's Graduation Performance ~2486 Days of Treasure~", was held at the AKB48 Theater on 30 August 2020. She officially graduated from the group on her 22nd birthday, 31 August 2020.

=== Post-AKB48 ===
On 2 December 2020, Kawamoto announced her affiliation with the talent agency Incubation.

On 20 February 2021, she made her acting debut in the net drama Net Kaidan × Hyakumonogatari Season 6.

On 31 December 2023, she announced that she has left Incubation. On April 1, 2024, she announced her transfer to A-music.

On 14 April, 2026, it was announced that Kawamoto would transfer to Sophie Promotion.

== Discography ==
=== AKB48 singles ===
Year	No.	Title	Role	Notes
2014	36	"Labrador Retriever"	B-side	Sang "B Garden" as part of Team B.
2014	38	"Kibouteki Refrain"	A-side	Kawamoto's first A-side. Also sang "Loneliness Club" as part of Team B.
2015	39	"Green Flash"	B-side	Sang on "Haru no Hikari Chikadzuita Natsu" as AKB48.
2015	40	"Bokutachi wa Tatakawanai"	A-side	Sang on "Bokutachi wa Tatakawanai" without participating in the music video. Also sang on "Summer Side" as Selection 16
2015	42	"Kuchibiru ni Be My Baby"	B-Side	Sang on "Kimi wo Kimi wo Kimi wo..." as Jisedai Senbatsu, and "Nanka, Chotto, Kyuu ni..." as Team 4.
2016	43	"Kimi wa Melody"	B-side	Marked as the 10th Anniversary Single. Also sang on "LALALA Message".

=== AKB48 albums ===
- Koko ga Rhodes da, Koko de Tobe!
  - "Birth"
  - "To Go de"

=== Others ===
- Miyuki Watanabe's solo single, "Yasashiku Suru yori Kiss o Shite"
  - "Harukaze Pianissimo"

== Appearances ==
=== Stage units ===
Team B Waiting Stage

1. "Avocado Janeshi" (アボガドじゃね～し)

Team B "Pajama Drive" Revival

1. "Tenshi no Shippo" (天使のしっぽ)

=== TV variety ===
- AKBingo! (2013–2019)
