= No3b =

Japanese vocal trio

no3b (No Sleeves) ノースリーブス
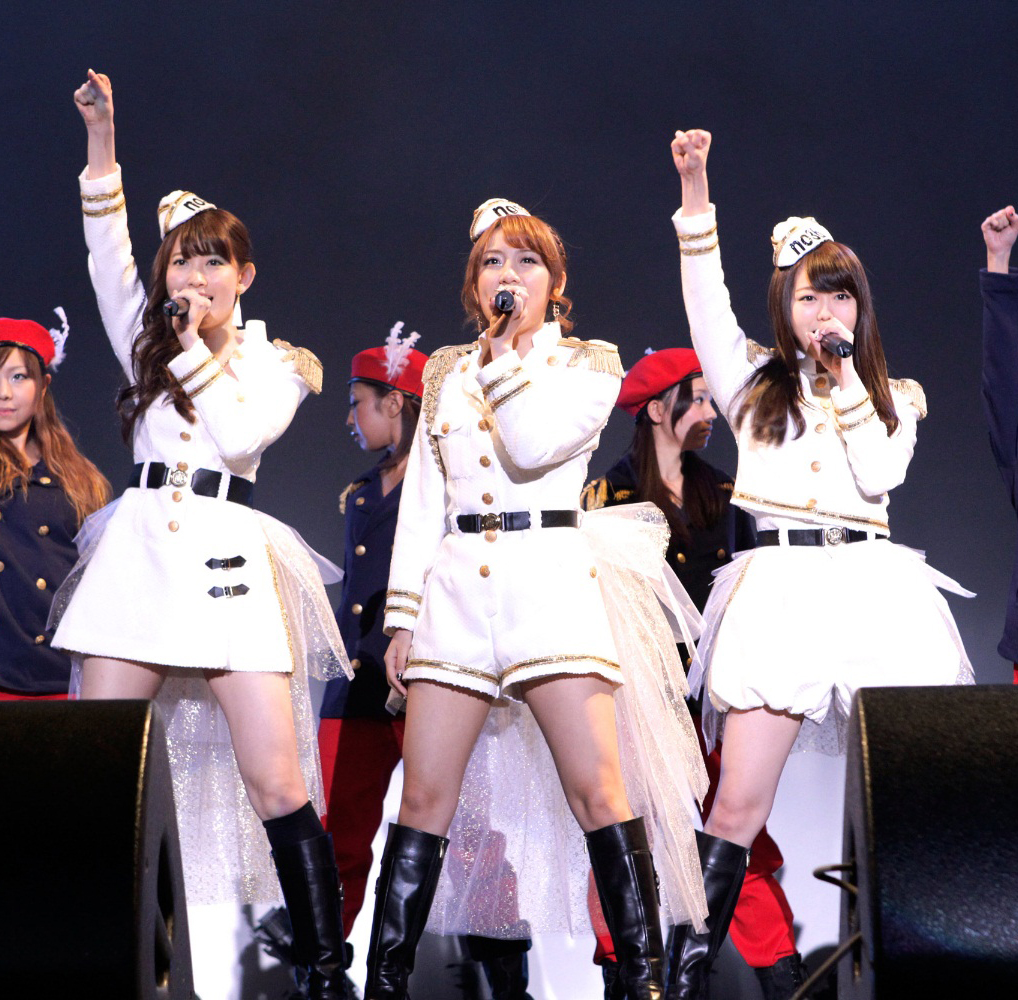
- no3b performing "Kirigirisu Jin" at Differ Ariake Arena, 2013. Left to right: Kojima, Takahashi, Minegishi.

Background information
- Also known as: no3b, Persona
- Origin: Akihabara, Tokyo, Japan
- Genres: J-pop
- Years active: 2008–present (de facto since 2013)
- Label: Epic
- Spinoff of: AKB48
- Members: Haruna Kojima; Minami Minegishi; Minami Takahashi
- Website: www.no3b.net

no3b, read as No Sleeves (ノースリーブス, Nō Surībusu), is a Japanese idol girl group spun off from AKB48, featuring Haruna Kojima, Minami Minegishi and Minami Takahashi. Despite being inactive since 2013, the group has not officially disbanded and its three members continue to perform in select events.

== History ==
The trio debuted officially under the name No Sleeves in November 2008, but were previously grouped together and performed the songs "Junai no Crescendo" and "Bye Bye Bye" at AKB48 concerts and stage DVDs. As of 2014, they have had eight Oricon top 10 singles. The group has released two digital singles under the name Persona (ペルソナ, Perusona) for the TV Tokyo drama Men Dol: Ikemen Idol in which they starred.

After a year of inactivity following the release of their eighth single, "Pedicure Day" in December 2011, no3b joined as MC in Fuji TV's midnight ad lib music variety show Snack Kissa Eden (スナック喫茶エデン; Café and Snack Eden) together with Tetsuya Komuro, Kosuke Suzuki, and Lily Franky, where they held their first recorded performance of the next single, "Kirigirisu Jin".

No Sleeves' songs featured in different media: "3seconds" and "Christmas Present" in the drama Men Dol: Ikemen Idol as insert songs, with "Relax!" as the theme song. "Tane" was used as the ending theme for the anime Birdy the Mighty Decode:02. "Kiss no Ryūsei" was used as the opening theme for the TBS ranking show Rank Ōkoku (ランク王国; Rank Kingdom) from December 2009 to January 2010. "Lie" was used as the ending theme for the TBS TV show Ariyoshi AKB Kyōwakoku (有吉AKB共和国; Republic of Ariyoshi and AKB). "Kimi Shika" as the mobile drama Kotodama no Onna-tachi (言霊の女たち。; Women of Kotodama) theme song, Shiodome Expo 2010 (汐博|汐留博覧会2010) theme song and the variety show Jack 10 (ジャック10) theme song (August 2010). "Answer" was used as the ending theme to the anime Beelzebub. "Asatte, Jamaica" as the mobile drama Zoku: Kotodama no Onna-tachi (続・言霊の女たち。; Sequel: Women of Kotodama) theme song. "Kirigirisu Jin" as Fuji TV variety show Snack Kissa Eden insert song and ending theme. "Iin Ja Ne?" as the TV drama Megu-tan tte Mahō Tsukaeru no? (メグたんって魔法つかえるの?; Could Megu-tan Use Magic?) theme song.

The group reunited for their 10th Anniversary Live Performance on November 26, 2018.

== Members ==
- Haruna Kojima
- Minami Minegishi
- Minami Takahashi

== Discography ==
=== Albums ===
Year	Title	Oricon Album Chart	Total* sales
2011	No Sleeves (ノースリーブス)	1	103,042

=== Singles ===
Year	Title	Total Sales* Notes	Chart positions			Album
Year	Title	Total Sales* Notes	Oricon Singles Weekly Charts	Billboard Japan Hot 100	RIAJ digital tracks	Album
2008	"3seconds"	Digital single as Persona.	–	–	–	No Sleeves
2008	"Relax!"	–	13	24	–	No Sleeves
2008	"Christmas Present" (クリスマスプレゼント)	Digital single as Persona.	–	–	–	No Sleeves
2009	"Tane" (タネ; "Seed")	–	9	46	–	No Sleeves
2009	"Kiss no Ryūsei" (キスの流星; "Shooting Star of Kisses")	29,434	8	17	72	No Sleeves
2010	"Lie"	32,668	5	10	41	No Sleeves
2010	"Kimi Shika" (君しか; "No One But You")	41,168	6	12	94	TBA
2011	"Answer"	108,831	2	3	7	TBA
2011	"Kuchibiru Furezu..." (唇 触れず・・・; "Without Touching Your Lips...")	120,593	3	4	18	TBA
2011	"Perori to Pepero" (ペロリとペペロ)	Digital single.	–	–	–	TBA
2011	"Pedicure Day" (ペディキュアday)	115,763	2	7	20	TBA
2013	"Kirigirisu Jin" (キリギリス人; "Grasshopper People")	100,108	2	3	**	TBA

* Unofficial figure obtained by adding together Oricon sales numbers for different periods of time when the single or album charted on Oricon.
** RIAJ Digital Track Chart was shut down in July 2012.

== Media appearances ==
=== TV programs ===
Year	Title
2010–	PON!
2012–2013	Snack Kissa Eden (スナック喫茶エデン)

=== Dramas ===
Year	Title	Media
2008	Men Dol: Ikemen Idol (メン☆ドル 〜イケメンアイドル〜)	TV
2010	Kotodama no Onna-tachi (言霊の女たち。)	Mobile
2011	Zoku: Kotodama no Onna-tachi (続・言霊の女たち。)	Mobile

=== Radio ===
Year	Title
2009–	No Sleeves no "Shūkan No Slee-bu" (ノースリーブスの「週刊ノースリー部」)
2009–2010	No Sleeves no "All Night Nippon" (ノースリーブスのオールナイトニッポン)
