= Haruna Kojima =

Japanese actress, former member of AKB48, member of no3b (1988-)

- 小嶋 陽菜
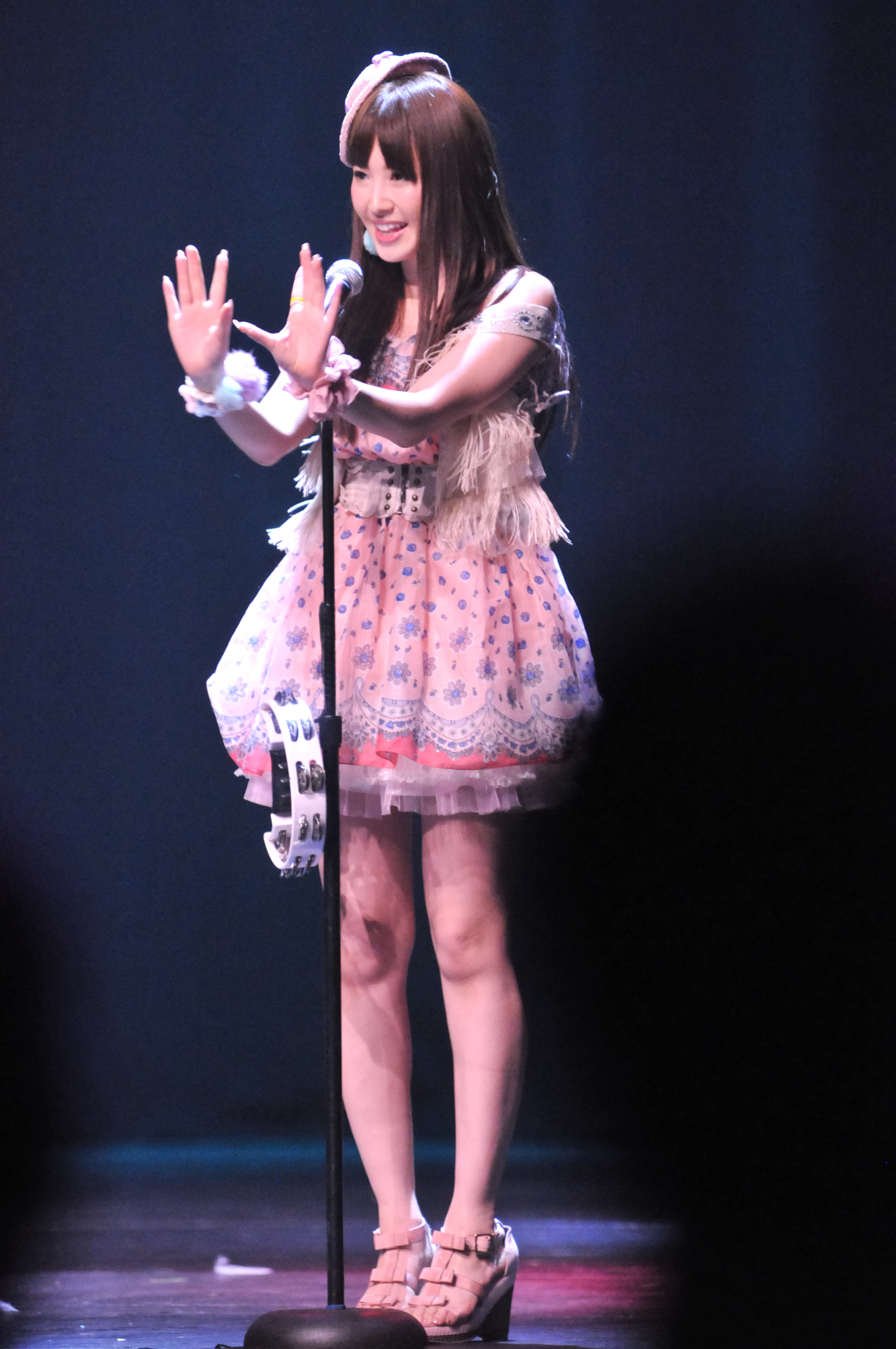
- Kojima in 2010
- Born: April 19, 1988 (age 38); Urawa-ku, Saitama, Saitama Prefecture, Japan
- Occupations: Actress; singer; model; entrepreneur
- Years active: 1998–2001, 2005–present
- Height: 164 cm (5 ft 5 in)
- Spouse: Unknown (m. 2026)
- Children: 1
- Musical career
- Genre: J-pop
- Instrument: Vocals
- Labels: King (AKB48); Epic (no3b)
- Member of: no3b
- Formerly of: Angel Eyes; AKB48

YouTube information
- Channel: Haruna Kojima's Cat Nap
- Years active: 2019–present
- Genres: Beauty; vlog
- Subscribers: 693 thousand
- Views: 138 million
- Last updated: 4 August, 2026

Haruna Kojima (小嶋 陽菜, Kojima Haruna; born April 19, 1988) is a Japanese entrepreneur, actress, model, and former singer. She is a member of no3b and was a member of idol group AKB48 from 2005 to 2017. In 2018, she founded her own brand, "Her lip to".

== Career ==
Kojima was born in Urawa-ku, Saitama, Saitama Prefecture. She started her career as a member of Angel Eyes, an idol group. After Angel Eyes disbanded in 2001, she remained in contract with Stardust, but later switched to Ogi Production.

Kojima participated in the first AKB48 audition in July 2005, which she passed along with 23 other participants, because the application was just taking a self-image by a mobile phone and e-mail it, and assuming that she "could take 10-time prettier one, and just sent". Although she voluntarily applied for the audition and passed, she was still looking at then-AKB48 project in a suspicious way, and tried to skip the very first dancing lesson because of her then-part-time job, but eventually participated it in response to the persuasion by Tomonobu Togasaki, Manager of AKB48 Theater.

The group made their debut in December of the same year, and Kojima was assigned as one of the 20 members of Team A; the number later dropped down to 16 but Kojima remained as a member.

In the past few years, she had made several appearances on television with the group, and is the only member to participate on all A-sides of the group's singles (except Eien Pressure) since the beginning of AKB48, making her one of the most visible figures in the group.

Kojima made her first appearance on Kohaku Uta Gassen, an annual music show where the most successful artists of the year are invited, with AKB48 on December 31, 2007.

Since 2007, Kojima has been actively exploring a possible acting career, and has made several appearances in a number of dramas and movies. Her first lead role came in the drama Coin Locker Monogatari (コインロッカー物語; literally Coin Locker Story), which was filmed and aired in early 2008. Additionally, Kojima made her first appearance on the silver screen in the horror movie Densen Uta (伝染歌), along with several fellow AKB48 members. The group has also made brief appearance at the beginning of the movie in a live performance.

She was transferred from Team A to become a member of Team B during reshuffling of teams at the Tokyo Dome Concert held on August 24, 2012.

On September 18, 2013, AKB48 announced Kojima to be the center of the group's 33rd single, "Heart Electric".

In 2015, she and Yuki Kashiwagi were the center performers for the AKB48 single "Green Flash".

In AKB48's general election for 2016, under the name Nyan Nyan Kamen (にゃんにゃん仮面; literally Meow Meow Masked), Kojima finished 16th with 40,071 votes. During the results event on June 18, 2016, she announced that she would be leaving from the group. She said that she had thought about doing it two years ago, but the timing wasn't right especially given the handshake incident in 2014. She said that she was 28 and wanted to take the next step to become an adult woman. In 2017, she was announced as the center performer for AKB48's 47th single "Shoot Sign", released in March 2017. It marked her first center performance since "Green Flash" two years ago, and her third center performance on an AKB48 single overall. After her graduation concert "Kojimatsuri ~ Kojima Haruna Kanshasai ~" (こじまつり～小嶋陽菜感謝祭～; literally Kojima Festival ~ Kojima Haruna Thanksgiving ~) on February 21–22, 2017, she performed at the AKB48 theatre for the last time, on her birthday, on April 19, 2017.

In 2018, she founded her own brand, "Her lip to". She expanded her brand by launching "Her lip to Beauty", "House of Herme", and "Rosier by HLT" in 2022.

== Personal life ==
On November 7, 2026, Kojima announced her marriage and the birth of her first child.

== Filmography ==
=== Movies ===
| Year | English Title | Japanese Title | Role |
|---|---|---|---|
| 2007 | Densen Uta | 伝染歌 | Kiriko (キリコ) |

=== Dramas ===
| Year | English Title | Japanese Title | Role |
|---|---|---|---|
| 2006 | Densha Otoko Deluxe | 電車男デラックス | Herself |
| 2007 | Joshi Deka! | ジョシデカ！ | Arcade girl |
| 2007 | Yamada Tarō Monogatari | 山田太郎ものがたり | Kotone Usui (臼井琴音) |
| 2007 | Mou Hitotsu no Zou no Senaka | もうひとつの象の背中 | Nami (奈美) |
| 2008 | Coin Locker Monogatari | コインロッカー物語 | Miki Hayama (葉山未来) |
| 2008 | Muri na Renai | 無理な恋愛 | Asako Ogawa (小川朝子) |
| 2008 | Gokusen 3 | ごくせん3 | Saki Fujimura (藤村早希) |
| 2008 | Yasuko to Kenji | ヤスコとケンジ | Shingyoji Hiyoko |
| 2008 | Mendol | メン☆ドル | Wakamatsu Asahi |
| 2009 | Mei-chan no Shitsuji | メイちゃんの執事 | Takenomiya Nao |
| 2010 | Majisuka Gakuen | マジすか学園 | Torigoya (トリゴヤ) |
| 2011 | Ikemen desu ne | 美男ですね | Nana |
| 2011 | Majisuka Gakuen 2 | マジすか学園2 | Torigoya (トリゴヤ) |
| 2012 | Megutan tte Mahou Tsukaeru no? | メグたんって魔法つかえるの? | Megutan (メグたん) |
| 2012 | PRICELE$S | PRICELE$S〜あるわけねぇだろ、んなもん!〜 | Moe Tomizawa (富沢 萌) |
| 2015 | Majisuka Gakuen 4 | マジすか学園4 | Kojiharu (こじはる) |
| 2015 | Majisuka Gakuen 5 | マジすか学園5 | Torigoya (トリゴヤ) |
| 2015 | AKB Horror Night: Adrenaline's Night | AKBホラーナイト アドレナリンの夜 | Ms. Kaede (楓先生) Ep.22 – Teacher, Hate |
| 2016 | Cabasuka Gakuen | キャバすか学園 | Kojiharu (Konbu) (こじはる (こんぶ)) Ep.4 |
| 2017 | Tofu Pro-Wrestling | 豆腐プロレス | Haruna Kojima (Legend Kojima) (小嶋 陽菜 (レジェンド小嶋)) Ep.8 |

== Discography ==
=== Singles with AKB48 ===
| Year | No. | Title | Role | Notes |
|---|---|---|---|---|
| 2006 | Ind-1 | "Sakura no Hanabiratachi" | A-Side | Debut with Team A. |
| 2006 | Ind-2 | "Skirt, Hirari" | A-Side | One of seven main singers. |
| 2006 | 1 | "Aitakatta" | A-Side | |
| 2007 | 2 | "Seifuku ga Jama o Suru" | A-Side | |
| 2007 | 3 | "Keibetsu Shiteita Aijō" | A-Side | |
| 2007 | 4 | "Bingo!" | A-Side | |
| 2007 | 5 | "Boku no Taiyō" | A-Side | |
| 2007 | 6 | "Yūhi o Miteiru ka?" | A-Side, Center | |
| 2008 | 7 | "Romance, Irane" | A-Side, Center | |
| 2008 | 8 | "Sakura no Hanabiratachi 2008" | A-Side | Also sang on "Saigo no Seifuku" |
| 2008 | 9 | "Baby! Baby! Baby!" | A-Side | |
| 2008 | 10 | "Ōgoe Diamond" | A-Side | |
| 2009 | 11 | "10nen Sakura" | A-Side | Also sang on "Sakurairo no Sora no Shita de" |
| 2009 | 12 | "Namida Surprise!" | A-Side | |
| 2009 | 13 | "Iiwake Maybe" | A-Side | Placed 6th in 2009 General Election |
| 2009 | 14 | "River" | A-Side | |
| 2010 | 15 | "Sakura no Shiori" | A-Side | Also sang on "Majisuka Rock 'n' Roll". |
| 2010 | 16 | "Ponytail to Shushu" | A-Side | Also sang on "Majijo Teppen Blues" |
| 2010 | 17 | "Heavy Rotation" | A-Side | Placed 7th in 2010 General Election. Also sang on "Yasai Sisters" and "Lucky Seven". |
| 2010 | 18 | "Beginner" | A-Side | |
| 2010 | 19 | "Chance no Junban" | A-side | Placed 3rd in rock-paper-scissors tournament. Sang on "Yoyakushita Christmas"; and "Kurumi to Dialogue" as Team A. |
| 2011 | 20 | "Sakura no Ki ni Narō" | A-Side | |
| 2011 | – | "Dareka no Tame ni – What can I do for someone?" | – | charity single |
| 2011 | 21 | "Everyday, Katyusha" | A-Side | Also sang on "Korekara Wonderland" and "Yankee Soul". |
| 2011 | 22 | "Flying Get" | A-Side | Placed 6th in 2011 General Election. Also sang on "Seishun to Kizukanai Mama" and "Yasai Uranai" |
| 2011 | 23 | "Kaze wa Fuiteiru" | A-Side | |
| 2011 | 24 | "Ue kara Mariko" | A-Side | Finished in round of 16; lineup was determined by rock-paper-scissors tournament; She sang on "Noël no Yoru"; and on "Rinjin wa Kizutsukanai" as Team A. |
| 2012 | 25 | "Give Me Five!" | A-Side (Baby Blossom), Special Girls B | Played synthesizer in Baby Blossom; She also sang on "Hitsujikai no Tabi" as part of Special Girls B. |
| 2012 | 26 | "Manatsu no Sounds Good!" | A-Side | |
| 2012 | 27 | "Gingham Check" | A-Side | Placed 7th in 2012 General Election. Also sang on "Yume no Kawa". |
| 2012 | 28 | "Uza" | A-Side, New Team B | Also sang on "Seigi no Mikata ja Nai Hero" as New Team B. She is now part of Team B. |
| 2012 | 29 | "Eien Pressure" | B-side, OKL48 | Did not sing on title track; lineup was determined by rock-paper-scissors tournament. Sang on "Totteoki Christmas"; and sang on "Eien Yori Tsuzuku Yō ni" as part of OKL48. |
| 2013 | 30 | "So Long!" | A-Side | Sang on "Sokode inu no unchi fun jau ka ne?" as Team B. |
| 2013 | 31 | "Sayonara Crawl" | A-Side | Also sang on "Romance Kenjuu" and "Haste to Waste" |
| 2013 | 32 | "Koi Suru Fortune Cookie" | A-Side | Placed 9th in 2013 General Election. Also sang on "Namida no Sei Janai" and "Saigo no Door". |
| 2013 | 33 | "Heart Electric" | A-Side, Center | First solo center. Given nickname "Michelle". |
| 2013 | 34 | "Suzukake no Ki no Michi de "Kimi no Hohoemi o Yume ni Miru" to Itte Shimattara Bokutachi no Kankei wa Dō Kawatte Shimau no ka, Bokunari ni Nan-nichi ka Kangaeta Ue de no Yaya Kihazukashii Ketsuron no Yō na Mono" | B-side | Did not sing on title track; lineup was determined by rock-paper-scissors tournament. Sang on "Mosh & Dive". Sang on "Party is Over". |
| 2014 | 35 | "Mae shika Mukanee" | A-side | |
| 2014 | 36 | "Labrador Retriever" | A-side | Also sang on "Kyou Made no Melody" and "Kimi wa Kimagure". |
| 2014 | 37 | "Kokoro no Placard" | A-side | Placed 8th in 2014 General Election. |
| 2014 | 38 | "Kibouteki Refrain" | A-side | |
| 2015 | 39 | "Green Flash" | A-side, center | Center position with Yuki Kashiwagi. Also sang "Haru no Hikari Chikadzuita Natsu" and "Hakimono to Kasa no Monogatari". |
| 2015 | 40 | "Bokutachi wa Tatakawanai" | A-side | Also sang "Kimi no Dai Ni Shō". |
| 2015 | 41 | Halloween Night | B-side | Did not sing on title track and did not participate in 2015 General Election. Sang on "Ippome Ondo". |
| 2015 | 42 | Kuchibiru ni Be My Baby | A-side | Also sang "365 Nichi no Kamihikōki", Senaka Kotoba", and "Yasashii place". |
| 2016 | 43 | "Kimi wa Melody" | A-side | Marked as the 10th Anniversary Single. Also sang "Mazariau Mono" as NogizakaAKB and "M.T ni Sasagu" as Team A. |
| 2016 | 44 | "Tsubasa wa Iranai" | A-side | Also sang "Set me free" as Team A. |
| 2016 | 45 | "Love Trip / Shiawase wo Wakenasai" | A-side | Placed 16th in 2016 General Election |
| 2016 | 46 | "High Tension" | A-side | |
| 2017 | 47 | "Shoot Sign" | A-side, Center | Last Single to participate. Also sang on "Kizuka Renai you ni..." which is her graduation song. |

=== Awards ===
- 15th Nikkan Sports Drama Grand Prix (Jul–Sept 2011): Best Supporting Actress for Ikemen desu ne
