= Miki Nishino =

Japanese tarento and idol (born 1999)

- 西野 未姫
- Born: April 4, 1999 (age 27); Shizuoka Prefecture, Japan
- Occupation: Television personality
- Years active: 2012–present
- Spouse: Keiichi Yamamoto (m. 2022)
- Children: 1
- Musical career
- Genres: J-pop
- Years active: 2012–2017
- Label: King/You, Be Cool! (AKB48)

Miki Nishino (西野 未姫, Nishino Miki; born April 4, 1999 in Shizuoka Prefecture) is a Japanese television personality and former idol. She is a former member of the girl group AKB48 under Team 4 and of AKB48's subgroup Tentoumu Chu!.

She is now a solo tarento and idol represented by Twin Planet, and formerly worked part-time at a yakiniku restaurant owned by fellow former AKB48 member Mayumi Uchida for a short period of time after graduation from AKB48.

She is currently active as a tarento, appearing on several variety programs. Her persona on-screen is associated with exaggerated movements and reactions, a style that is similar to Nana Suzuki, who is a senior at her agency Twin Planet Entertainment.

== Personal life ==
On November 22, 2022, Nishino announced her marriage to Gokuraku Tombo and Yoshimotozaka46 member Keiichi Yamamoto, who is thirty-one years her senior. On October 17, 2024, she gave birth to a daughter.

== Discography ==
=== AKB48 singles ===
| Year | No. | Title | Role | Notes |
|---|---|---|---|---|
| 2012 | 28 | "Uza" | B-side | Sang on "Otona e no Michi" as Kenkyūsei. |
| 2012 | 29 | "Eien Pressure" | B-side | Sang on "Watashitachi no Reason". |
| 2013 | 30 | "So Long!" | B-side | Sang on "Tsuyoi Hana" as Kenkyūsei. |
| 2013 | 31 | "Sayonara Crawl" | B-side | Sang on "Love Shugyō" as Kenkyūsei. |
| 2013 | 32 | "Koi Suru Fortune Cookie" | B-side | Sang on "Aozora Cafe". |
| 2013 | 33 | "Heart Electric" | B-side | Sang on "Seijun Philosophy" as Team 4, and on "Kimi Dake ni Chu! Chu! Chu!" as Tentoumu Chu!. |
| 2013 | 34 | "Suzukake no Ki no Michi de "Kimi no Hohoemi o Yume ni Miru" to Itte Shimattara Bokutachi no Kankei wa Dō Kawatte Shimau no ka, Bokunari ni Nan-nichi ka Kangaeta Ue de no Yaya Kihazukashii Ketsuron no Yō na Mono" | B-side | Sang on "Party is over" as AKB48, and on "Erande Rainbow" as Tentoumu Chu!. |
| 2014 | 35 | "Mae shika Mukanee" | B-side | Sang on "Kinō yori Motto Suki" as Smiling Lions. |
| 2014 | 36 | "Labrador Retriever (song)" | A-side | Sang on "Labrador Retriever", and "Heart no Dasshutsu Game" as Team 4. |
| 2014 | 37 | "Kokoro no Placard" | Future Girls | Ranked 62nd in 2014 Election. Sang on "Seikaku ga Warui Onna no Ko" |
| 2014 | 38 | "Kiboteki Refrain" | B-side | Sang "Ima, Happy" & "Me no Akete Mama no First Kiss" as Team 4. |
| 2015 | 39 | "Green Flash (song)" | Tentoumu Chu ! | Sang "Hatsukoi no Oshibe" |
| 2015 | 40 | "Bokutachi wa Tatakawanai" | Tentoumu Chu ! | Sang "'Danshi' wa Kenkyū Taishō" |

== Appearances ==
=== Dramas ===
- Joshikou Keisatsu (October 27, 2013 – March 17, 2014, Fuji TV)
- Sailor Zombie (June 7, 2014, episode 7, TV Tokyo) as Zombie girl
- Majisuka Gakuen 4 as Over (February 17, 2015, episode 6, Nippon TV)
- Majisuka Gakuen 5 as Chicken (October 6, 2015, episode 9, Hulu)

=== Television programs ===
- Ariyoshi AKB Kyōwakoku (November 19, 2012 – present, TBS)
- AKBingo! (June 25, 2013 – present, NTV)
- AKB48 Nemousu TV (September 15, 2013 – present, Family Gekijo)
- AKB48 Show! (October 5, 2013 – present, NHK)

=== Radio ===
- AKB48 no All Night Nippon (October 18, 2013, Nippon Broadcasting System)
