= Ayaka Umeda =

Japanese idol

- Born: January 3, 1989 (age 37); Fukuoka Prefecture, Japan
- Genres: J-pop, pop music
- Occupations: Japanese idol, singer
- Instrument: Vocals
- Years active: 2006, 2008–present
- Formerly of: AKB48, NMB48, Diva
- Website: office48.jp/pages/talent/umeda_ayaka/index

Ayaka Umeda (梅田 彩佳, Umeda Ayaka; born January 3, 1989) is a Japanese former idol and singer from the girl group NMB48, in which she is the co-captain of Team BII. She was also a member of the AKB48 and its subunit DiVA.

== Biography ==
=== 2004–2007: Early career, debut, injury ===
In 2004–2005, Umeda took part in the Morning Musume Lucky 7 Audition for the idol group Morning Musume, but only advanced to the second round.

On February 26, 2006, Umeda passed the second generation auditions for AKB48, and became one of 19 founding members for the group's Team K. Her on-stage debut was on April 1. She performed on the title track for AKB48's first single on a major label, "Aitakatta", released on October 26, 2006. As part of Team K 1st Stage, she was a front member for the song "Skirt, Hirari", along with Sayaka Akimoto, Yuko Oshima, Sae Miyazawa, and Kana Kobayashi.

Later in the year, Umeda developed a stress fracture in her foot, and was recommended by her manager to take a break from her performances to rehabilitate, starting December 23. Her rehabilitation took about a year, during which she was active on TV in Fukuoka Prefecture.

=== 2008–2011: Return to AKB48 ===
On May 31, 2008, Umeda returned to public performances with the premiere of a new seasonal Team K's show at the AKB48 Theater, titled Team K 4th Stage "Saishū Bell ga Naru". Prior to her injuries, she was one of the faces of Team K, but after her return, she was placed at the very end of the stage, extremely far from the center position where she used to stand.

In February 2009, Umeda was chosen as the D1 Grand Prix image girl.

In April, she was named the Tokyo Tower image girl for the year 2009, succeeding fellow AKB48 member Ayumi Orii.

In the AKB48 general election for 2010, Umeda placed 32nd, with 2,499 votes.

=== 2011: Diva, rise in AKB48 ===
On February 27, 2011, it was announced to the public that a new pop group named DiVA, consisting of Sayaka Akimoto, Yuka Masuda, Sae Miyazawa, and Ayaka Umeda had been formed. The group's debut single "Tsuki no Uragawa", whose release was originally scheduled for April 27, and postponed until May 18 due to the 2011 Tōhoku earthquake and tsunami, reached number 3 on the Oricon Weekly Singles Chart.

In the annual election, she placed 22nd, and headlined the Under Girls on the single's coupling track. In the AKB48 rock-paper-scissors tournament, which took place on September 20, she finished in the top 16, which earned her a spot on the title track. The song "Ue kara Mariko" became her first A-side of an AKB48's single in three and a half years, since "Baby! Baby! Baby!".

=== 2012: Team B captain ===
On June 6, in the AKB48 general election, she placed 16th and landed a spot on the title track for "Gingham Check".

On August 24, AKB48 announced a major reorganization, where Umeda moved to Team B and became the team's captain.

In the third AKB48 rock-paper-scissors tournament, which took place in September 2012, Umeda advanced to the top 16, and secured a title track spot on the group's 29th single, "Eien Pressure".

=== 2013: Senbatsu Election ===
Umeda ranked 19th in AKB48's general election, placing her in Undergirls and subsequently giving her a spot on the main B-side track of the election single, Koi Suru Fortune Cookie.

=== 2014: Transfer to NMB48 ===
On February 24, 2014, in the AKB48 Dai Sokaku Matsuri Shuffle, Umeda was completely transferred to NMB48 and became co-captain of Team BII.

=== 2016: Departing NMB48 ===
On January 23, 2016, at AKB48 Request Hour Setlist Best 100 2016, Umeda announced of leaving NMB48. On March 20, she graduated from the group and her graduation ceremony was hold on March 31, 2016, at Zepp Namba.

=== Singles with AKB48 ===
Year	No.	Title	Role	Notes
2006	1	"Aitakatta"	A-side	Debut with Team K.
2007	5	"Boku no Taiyō"	B-side	Did not sing on title track. Sang on "Mirai no Kajitsu".
2008	9	"Baby! Baby! Baby!"	A-side	
2009	14	"River"	Theater Girls	Did not sing on title track. Sang on "Hikōkigumo"
2010	16	"Ponytail to Shushu"	B-side	Did not sing on title track. Sang on "Boku no Yell"
2010	17	"Heavy Rotation"	B-side	Ranked 32nd in 2010 General Election. Did not sing on title track. Sang on "Namida no Sea-Saw Game"
2010	18	"Beginner"	Diva	Did not sing on title track. Sang on "Nakeru Basho" as Diva (not to be confused with Diva
2010	19	"Chance no Junban"	B-side	Did not sing on title track; lineup was determined by rock-paper-scissors tournament. Sang on "Alive" as Team K.
2011	20	"Sakura no Ki ni Narō"	B-side	Did not sing on title track. Sang on "Area K" as Diva.
2011	–	"Dareka no Tame ni – What can I do for someone?"	–	charity single
2011	21	"Everyday, Katyusha"	Under Girls	Did not sing on title track. Sang on "Hito to Chikara" as Under Girls.
2011	22	"Flying Get"	Under Girls	Ranked 22nd in 2011 General Election. Did not sing on title track. Sang on "Dakishimecha Ikenai".
2011	23	"Kaze wa Fuiteiru"	Under Girls Yurigumi	Did not sing on title track. Sang on "Gondola Lift" as Under Girls Yurigumi
2011	24	"Ue kara Mariko"	A-side	Placed in top 16 in rock-paper-scissors tournament; She sang on "Zero-sum Taiyo" with Team K.
2012	25	"Give Me Five!"	Special Girls B	Did not sing on title track. Sang "Hitsujikai no Tabi" with Special Girls B.
2012	26	"Manatsu no Sounds Good!"	Special Girls	Did not sing on title track. Sang on "Mitsu no Namida" as Special Girls.
2012	27	"Gingham Check"	A-side	Ranked 16th in 2012 General Election.
2012	28	"Uza"	B-side	Did not sing on title track. Sang on "Seigi no Mikata ja Nai Hero". Moved to Team B.
2012	29	"Eien Pressure"	A-side	Placed 15th in rock-paper-scissors tournament. Sang on "Totteoki Christmas".
2013	30	"So Long!"	B-side	Did not sing on title track. Sang on "Sokode inu no unchi fun jau ka ne?" with Team B.
2013	31	"Sayonara Crawl"	B-side	Did not sing on title track. Sang on "Romance Kenjuu" with Team B.
2013	32	"Koi Suru Fortune Cookie"	Under Girls	Ranked 19th in 2013 General Election. Did not sing on title track. Sang on "Ai no Imi wo Kangaete Mita".
2013	33	"Heart Electric"	Under Girls	Sang on :Kaisoku to Doutai Shiryoku"
2013	34	"Suzukake no Ki no Michi de "Kimi no Hohoemi o Yume ni Miru" to Itte Shimattara Bokutachi no Kankei wa Dō Kawatte Shimau no ka, Bokunari ni Nan-nichi ka Kangaeta Ue de no Yaya Kihazukashii Ketsuron no Yō na Mono"	B-side	Did not sing on title track; lineup was determined by rock-paper-scissors tournament. Sang on "Mosh & Dive".
2014	37	"Kokoro no Placard"	Next Girls	Ranked 35th in 2014 General Election. Did not sing on main track. Sang "Hito Natsu no Hankouki" instead.
2014	38	"Kibōteki Refrain"	B-Side	Sang "Utaitai".
2015	39	"Green Flash"	B-side	Sang "Punkish"

=== Singles with NMB48 ===
Year	No.	Title	Role	Notes
2014	10	"Rashikunai"	A-Side	
2015	11	"Don't Look Back!"	A-Side	Also sang "Romantic Snow"
2015	12	"Durian Shōnen"	A-Side	
2015	13	"Must Be Now"	A-Side	Last single to participate as NMB48 member.

=== Singles with SKE48 ===
Year	No.	Title	Role	Notes
2016	19	"Chicken Line"	B-side	Sang on "Tabi no Tochū". Participated as graduated member.

== AKB48 stage units ==
Team K 1st Stage "Party ga Hajimaru yo"

- "Skirt, Hirari"

Team K 2nd Stage "Seishun Girls"

- "Ame no Dōbutsuen"
- "Fushidara na Natsu"

Team K 3rd Stage "Nōnai Paradise"

- "Maria"

Team K 4th Stage "Saishu Bell ga Naru"

- "Return Match"

Team K 5th Stage "Sakaagari"

- "End Roll"

Team K 6th Stage "Reset"

- "Kokoro no Sofa"
- "Kiseki wa Maniawanai"

== Filmography ==
=== TV series ===
- Arirenai! (ありえない!) (Ep. 1, January 13. 2010, MBS)
- Majisuka Gakuen (Last ep., March 26, 2010, TV Tokyo)
- Kankyō Chōjin Ecogainder (June 26 – November 1, 2010, Kids Station)
- Majisuka Gakuen 2 (Last ep., July 1, 2011, TV Tokyo) — Ayaka

=== Musicals ===
- In the Heights (as Nina Rosario) (2014)
- The Wiz (as Dorothy Gale) (2015)
- Endless SHOCK (as Rika) (2019-2021)
- EDGES the musical (Red Team) (2020)
- Galaxy Express 999 THE MUSICAL (as Claire) (2022)
- Sister Act (as Sister Mary Robert) (2023-2026)
- Tick, Tick... Boom! (as Susan) (2024)
