= Yuki Kashiwagi =

Japanese gravure idol, model, and actress (born 1991)

Yuki Kashiwagi 柏木 由紀
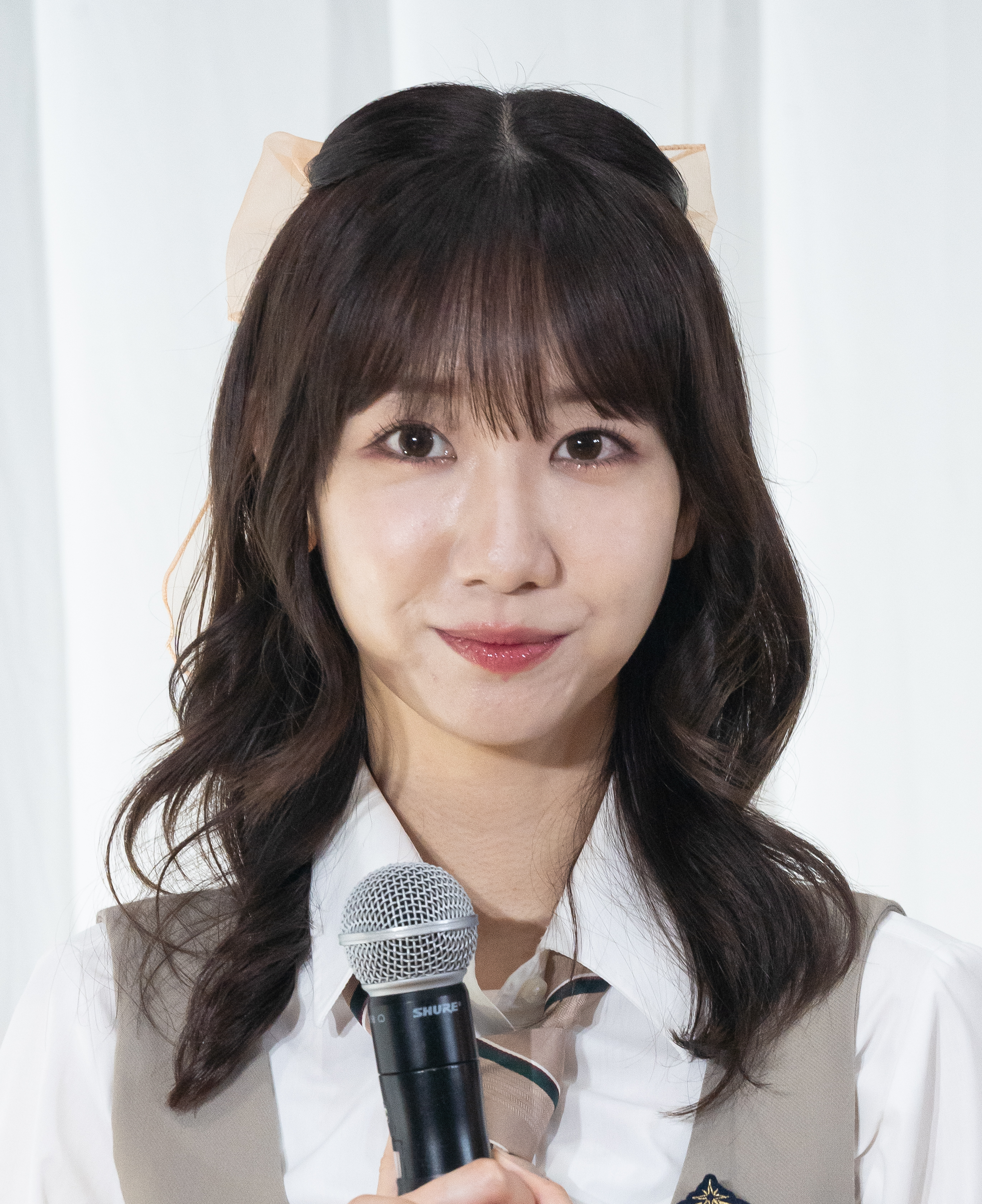
- Kashiwagi in 2023

Background information
- Born: 15 July 1991 (age 35); Kagoshima, Japan
- Genre: J-pop
- Occupations: gravure idol; model; actress
- Instrument: Vocals
- Years active: 2006-present
- Labels: Avex / YukiRing; King
- Formerly of: AKB48; French Kiss; NMB48; NGT48
- Website: yukikashiwagi.jp

Yuki Kashiwagi (柏木 由紀, Kashiwagi Yuki; born July 15, 1991) is a Japanese gravure idol, model, actress, and former singer. Kashiwagi began her career as a member of the girl group AKB48 and, later, their sister groups NMB48 and NGT48. Notable for spending 17 years with the group, she is recognized as the longest-serving member of AKB48 with the moniker "Eternal Idol". She is represented by Watanabe Productions.

Kashiwagi joined AKB48 on December 3, 2006, and was a member and captain of the group's Team B. She was also a member of AKB48 subgroup French Kiss, which released singles as a separate unit, and has released solo singles of her own.

In the annual AKB48 Group General Elections, Kashiwagi has consistently ranked among the group's top members. She placed ninth in 2009, eighth in 2010, third in 2011 and 2012, fourth in 2013, third in 2014, second in 2015 and fifth in 2016.

== Career ==
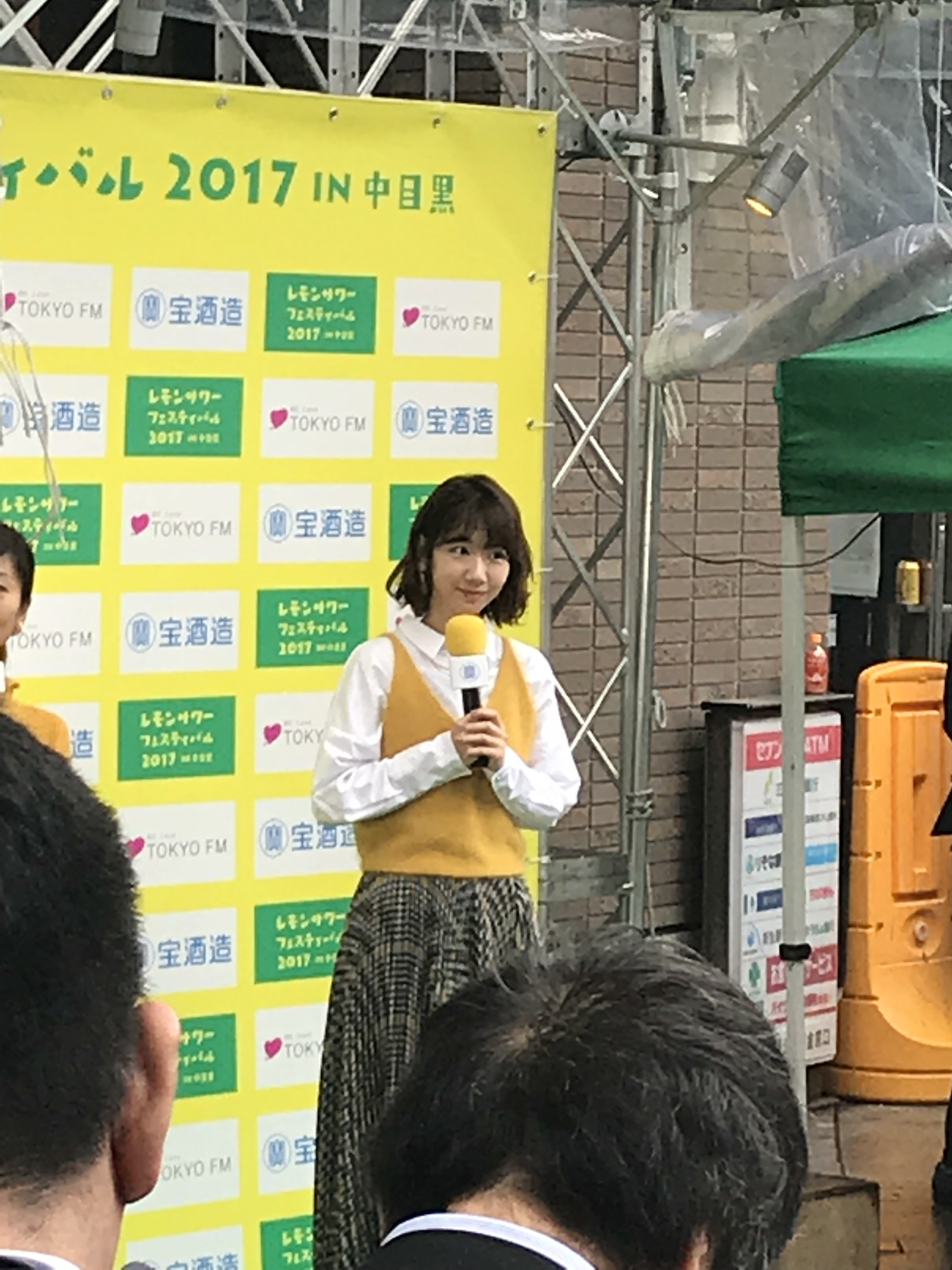
Kashiwagi at the opening ceremony of the Lemon Sour Festival, October 2017

Kashiwagi was born in Kagoshima, Japan. In October 2005, she auditioned for AKB48 and made it to the final judging but had to resign because her father objected and could not go to Tokyo. She later auditioned for idol group Morning Musume but was not selected. She joined AKB48 after an audition again on December 3, 2006, and made her debut as a member of Team B at the "AKB48 1st Anniversary Live – Seizoroi da ze! AKB!" concert. Before her theater debut, as part of the "AKB48 Haru no Chotto Dake Zenkoku Tour – Madamada da ze 48" tour, she appeared in Yuko Oshima's position on March 17 at the Aichi Welfare Pension Hall and on March 18 at the Fukuoka International Conference Hall. Her first AKB48 theater performance as a Team B member was on April 4, 2007. On March 25, 2009, she joined Watanabe Productions. On April 25, 2009, she became a weathergirl on Tokyo Broadcasting System's "Hiruobi". She came 9th place in the member elections for the single "Iiwake Maybe" and was made captain of Team B on August 23, 2009. Her first solo photobook was released on September 20, 2009. In 2010, she was made a member of three-piece AKB48 sub-group French Kiss. During the AKB48 third general election in 2011, she was ranked third place by popular votes, after Yuko Oshima and Atsuko Maeda.

Umeda Ayaka replaced Kashiwagi as the Captain of Team B, during the reformation of teams at the Tokyo Dome Concert held on August 24, 2012.

On February 6, 2013, Kashiwagi made a solo debut on her personal label "YukiRing", with the single "Shortcake".

In the annual general elections held in 2013, Kashiwagi came in fourth place with a total of 96,905 votes.

She then released her second solo single, "Birthday Wedding" on October 16, 2013.

In AKB48 Group Daisokaku Matsuri, held on February 24, 2014, she became a member of NMB48's Team N while remaining in AKB48's Team B. She made her first appearance as a member of NMB48 during the group's solo concert in Saitama Super Arena on April 5, 2014. She made her debut at the NMB48 theater on April 30, 2014.

In the group's annual general elections in 2014, Kashiwagi came in third place with a total of 104,364 votes.

Kashiwagi received her first center position for the group's 39th single, Green Flash since her debut in 2006. This single has two centers, the other center being Haruna Kojima.

On March 26, 2015, it was announced that she would be released from her concurrent position in NMB48, and hold a concurrent position in NGT48 which is planned to be formed in 2015. She placed No.2 in the AKB48 general election in 2015, and was selected for the 41st single senbatsu members. On April 17, she announced that she was withdrawing from NGT48, with a final performance at Team NIII's concert on April 21, 2019.

On April 9, 2021, it was announced that Kashiwagi would temporarily join all seven current WACK groups as a member, with the stage name Yuki Reysole. On August 31, all seven WACK groups released a single each, all of which featured Kashiwagi. The release of the singles was later delayed indefinitely following Kashiwagi's diagnosis of Syringomyelia. All seven of the singles were released on November 30.

On June 9, 2021, it was announced that Kashiwagi would be undergoing spinal cord surgery. As a result, her solo concerts for July 7-8 had been postponed.

On September 15, 2023, it was announced that she would celebrate her solo debut 10th anniversary with her third concert tour titled Kashiwagi Yuki 3rd Tour Netemo Samete mo Yukirin World ~ Solo Debut 10th Anniversary Mo Muchuu Ni Sasechauzou ~. On October 20, she announced her graduation from AKB48 at a concert in Tokyo. Her graduation concert was held on March 16, 2024 at the Pia Arena and her final performance at the AKB48 theater was held on April of the same year, ending her 17-year tenure with the group.

== Discography ==
=== Singles ===
==== As solo artist ====
Title	Year	Peak chart positions		Sales	Album
Title	Year	Oricon	Billboard	Sales	Album
"Shortcake" (ショートケーキ)	2013	2	2	—N/a	Non-album singles
"Birthday Wedding"	2013	2	2	—N/a	Non-album singles
"Can You Walk With Me??"	2021	4	—	JPN: 8,765	Non-album singles
"Shiawase Kinenbi" (シアワセ記念日)	2026	6	74	—N/a	Non-album singles

==== Collaborations ====
Title	Year	Peak chart positions	Sales	Album
Title	Year	Oricon	Sales	Album
"Against the World" with ASP	2021	16	JPN: 7,257	Non-album singles
"Anytime Anything" with Bis	2021	12	JPN: 7,828	Non-album singles
"Bad Temper" with Bish	2021	9	JPN: 9,225	Non-album singles
"Jikan ga Tarinai" (時間が足りない) with Empire	2021	14	JPN: 7,609	Non-album singles
"True Song" with Go to the Beds	2021	10	JPN: 8,021	Non-album singles
"Zutto ki ni Naru Zucchini" (ずっと気になるズッキーニ) with Mameshiba no Taigun	2021	11	JPN: 7,849	Non-album singles
"Natsu no Bakayarō" (夏のバカヤロー) with Paradises	2021	15	JPN: 7,401	Non-album singles

== Appearances ==
=== Dramas ===
- Majisuka Gakuen (マジすか学園) (2010) – Black
- Sakura kara no Tegami (桜からの手紙 〜AKB48 それぞれの卒業物語〜) (2011) – Kashiwagi Yuki
- Majisuka Gakuen 2 (マジすか学園2) (2011) – Black
- Hanazakari no Kimitachi e (花ざかりの君たちへ〜イケメン☆パラダイス〜2011) (2011) – Kishinosato Juri
- Mielino Kashiwagi (ミエリーノ柏木) (2013) – Kashiwagi Yuki
- So long! (2013) – Goto Midori
- Fukuoka Renai Hakusho 8 – Megu to Ai-kun (福岡恋愛白書8 メグとアイくん) (2013) – Inoue Sae
- Galileo (タガーリン) (2013) – Ejima Chihiro
- Fortune Cookies (WONDA×AKB48 ショートストーリー「フォーチュンクッキー」) (2013)
- Yorozu Uranaidokoro Onmyoya e Yokoso (よろず占い処 陰陽屋へようこそ) (2013) – Ayukawa Tamaki
- Kurofuku Monogatari (黒服物語) (2014) – Miki
- Majisuka Gakuen 5 (マジすか学園5) (2015) – Black (ep.2)
- AKB Horror Night: Adrenline's Night (AKBホラーナイト アドレナリンの夜) Ep.13 - Rapidly (2015) – Sana
- AKB Love Night: Love Factory (AKBラブナイト 恋工場) Ep.1 - First Time in the Morning (2016) – Miki Kirimoto
- Cabasuka Gakuen (キャバすか学園) (2016) – Kashiwagi (Anago) (ep.4 - 5)
- Segodon (2018) – Saigō Sono

=== Variety ===
- AKB 1ji59fun! (AKB1じ59ふん!) (2008)
- AKB 0ji59fun! (AKB0じ59ふん!) (2008)
- AKBingo! (2008-2019) (Irregular appearances)
- Hiruobi! (ひるおび!) (2009- )
- AKB48 Nemousu TV (AKB48ネ申テレビ) (2009- ) (Irregular appearances)
- Ariyoshi AKB Kyowakoku (有吉AKB共和国) (Irregular appearances)
- AKB48 SHOW! (2013-2019)
- AKB Shirabe (※AKB調べ) (2014-2015)

=== Anime ===
- Tales of the Abyss (October 2008 – March 2009, MBS)
- Sket Dance (April 2011 – March 2012, TV Tokyo)

=== Musicals ===
- ∞・Infinity (2009) – Takashima Maria (Double cast with Minami Takahashi)

=== Radio ===
- AKB48 Ashita Made Mou Chotto (April 28, 2008 –, Nippon Cultural Broadcasting)
- ON8 (April 20, 2009 –, bayfm)
- Holiday Special bayfm meets AKB48 3rd Stage ~Real~ (September 15, 2008, bayfm)
- AKB48 Konya wa Kaeranai (November 29, 2008 – Chubu-Nippon Broadcasting)
- Kashiwagi Yuki no YUKIRIN TIME (2012- )
- AKB48 no All Night Nippon (Irregular appearances)
- Listen? ~Live 4 Life~ (Irregular appearances)
- ON8+1 (Irregular appearances)

=== Concerts ===
==== with AKB48 ====
- AKB48 Request Hour Set List Best 100 (January 21–24, 2008)
- Live DVD wa Derudarou kedo, Yappari Name ni Kagiruze (August 23, 2008)
- AKB48 Masaka, Kono Concert no Ongen wa Ryuushutsu shinai yo ne? (November 23, 2008)
- End of the Year Thanksgiving: We're going to shuffle AKB! Give your regards to SKE as well (20 December 2008)
- AKB48 Request Hour Set List Best 100 2009 (January 18, 2009)
- AKB48 Bunshin no Jutsu Tour (August 15, 2009)
- AKB48 Natsu no Saruobasan Matsuri (September 13, 2009)

==== Solo ====
- Kashiwagi Yuki 3rd Solo Live Nete no Samete mo Yukirin World ~Motto Muchuu ni Sasechauzo♡~ (2013 concert, 2014 DVD/BD)

== Bibliography ==
=== Magazines ===
- Weekly Young Jump, Shueisha 1979-, since 2010

=== Photobooks ===
- Kashiwagi Yuki First Photobook Ijō, Kashiwagi Yuki Deshita (September 28, 2009, Tokyo News Service) ISBN 9784863360662
- ミニマムAKB48柏木由紀 Minimum AKB48 Yuki Kashiwagi (20 october 2011, rokusaisha) ISBN 9784846308339
- Kashiwagi Yuki Second Photobook Yu, Yu, Yukirin... (April 19, 2012, Shueisha) ISBN 9784087806441

== Advertising ==
- AKB48 X RAVIJOUR (Yuiri Murayama, Yuki Kashiwagi and Miu Shitao as its new brand ambassadors)
