= Kana Kobayashi =

Japanese idol (born 1991)

Kana Kobayashi 小林 香菜
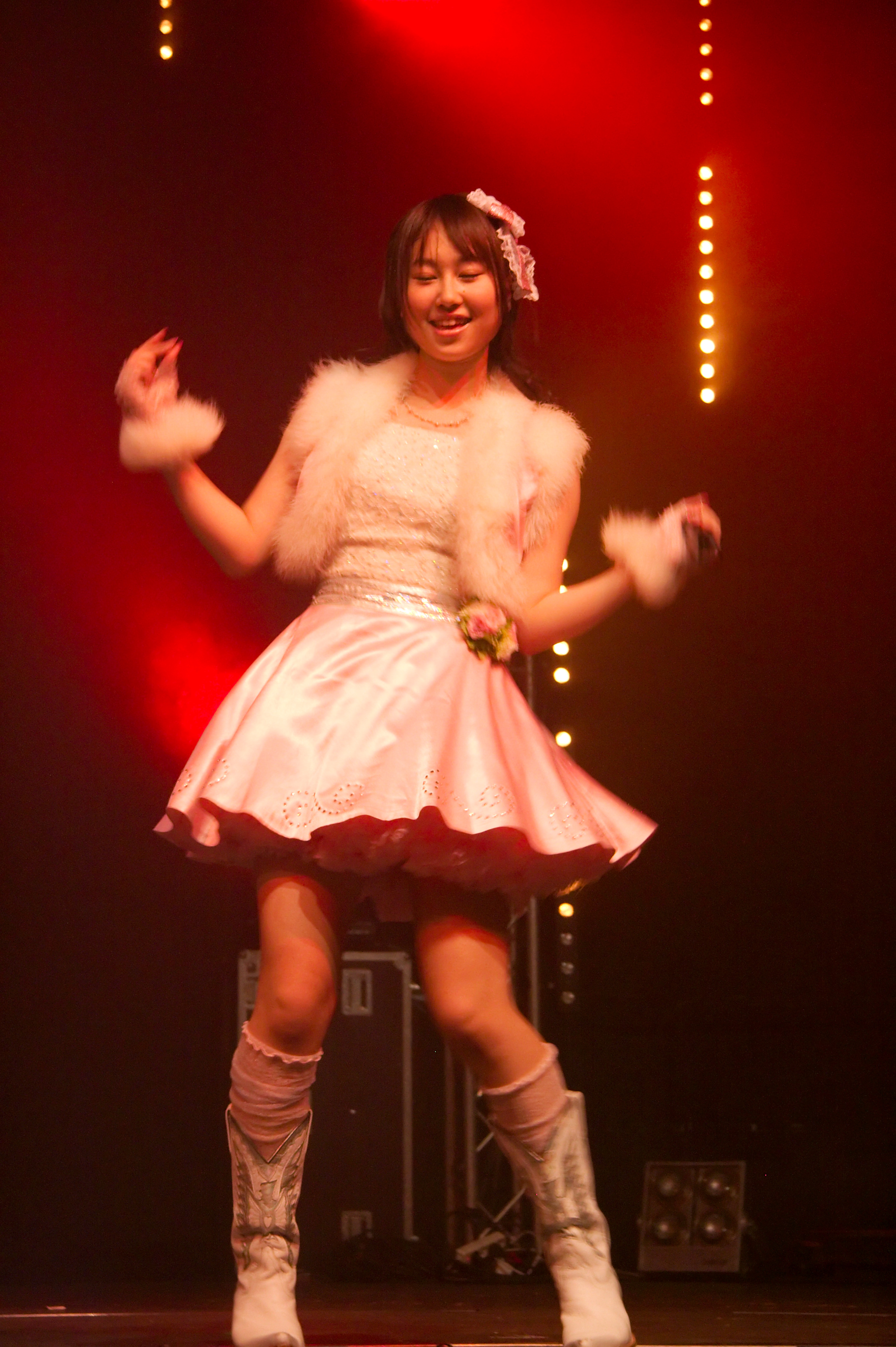
- Kana Kobayashi in Japan Expo 2009 (3 July 2009).

Background information
- Also known as: Kana-chan (かなちゃん); KK; Kāchi (かぁち); Kacchan (かっちゃん)
- Born: May 17, 1991 (age 35); Koshigaya, Saitama, Japan
- Genres: Idol music
- Occupation: Idol
- Years active: 2006–present
- Label: King Records (AKB48)
- Website: Official website

Kana Kobayashi (小林 香菜, Kobayashi Kana; born 17 May 1991, in Koshigaya, Saitama, Japan) is a Japanese idol who is a former member of AKB48 who was part of Team B and later Team K. She has appeared in a number of television shows, feature films and stage productions. Kobayashi is represented with Promage.

On July 8, 2021, Kobayashi announced her marriage to a non-celebrity boyfriend who works as an investor. She gave birth to a son on March 16, 2022.

On January 17, 2023, she announced on her social media that her divorce was finalized and will focus on her efforts of raising her child as a single mother.

== AKB48 discography ==
=== Singles ===
Title	Notes
"Aitakatta"	
"Seifuku ga Jama o Suru"	"Virgin love"; as part of Team K
"Keibetsu Shiteita Aijō"	
"Yūhi o Miteiru ka?"	"Yūhi o Miteiru ka?" (Himawari 2.0 Mix)
"Romance, Irane"	"Romance, Irane" (Himawari 2.0 Mix)
"Ōgoe Diamond"	"Ōgoe Diamond" (Team K ver.); as part of Team K
"River"	"Hikōkigumo"; as part Theater Girls
"Ponytail to Shushu"	"Boku no Yell"; as part of Theater Girls
"Beginner"	"Nakeru Basho"; as part of Diva
"Chance no Junban"	"Love Jump"; as part of Team B
"Sakura no Ki ni Narō"	"Area K"; as part of Diva
"Everyday, Katyusha"	"Hito no Chikara"; as part of Under Girls
"Kaze wa Fuiteiru"	"Vamos"; as part of Under Girls Bara-gumi
"Ue kara Mariko"	"Yobisute Fantasy"; as part of Team B
"Give Me Five!"	"Yungu ya Furoito no Baai"; as part of Special Girls C
"Manatsu no Sounds Good!"	"3ttsu no namida"; as part of Special Girls
"Gingham Check"	"DoReMiFa Onchi"; as part of Next Girls
"Uza"	"Scrap & Build"; as part of Team K
"Eien Pressure"	"Watashitachi no Reason"
"So Long!"	"Yūhi Marie"; as part of Oshima Team K
"Sayonara Crawl"	"How come?"; as part of Team K
"Heart Electric"	"Sasameyuki Regret"; as part of Team K
"Mae shika Mukanee"	"Koi toka..."
"Labrador Retriever"	"Kyō made no Melody"; "Aishiki Rival"; as part of Team K
"Kibōteki Refrain"	"Hajimete no Drive"; as part of Team K
"Kuchibiru ni Be My Baby"	"Kin no Hane o Motsu Hito yo"; as part of Team B

=== Albums ===
Title	Song	Notes
Kamikyokutachi	"Kimi to Niji to Taiyō to"	
Koko ni Ita Koto	"Renai Circus"	As part of Team B
Koko ni Ita Koto	"Koko ni Ita Koto"	As part of AKB48+SKE48+NMB48+HKT48
1830m	"Nōkan"	As part of Team B
1830m	"Aozora yo Sabishikunai ka?"	As part of AKB48+SKE48+NMB48+HKT48
Tsugi no Ashiato	"Tsuyo-sa to Yowa-sa no Ma de"	
Tsugi no Ashiato	"Kyōhan-sha"	As part of Team K
Koko ga Rhodes da, Koko de Tobe!	"Conveyor"	As part of Yokoyama Team K
0 to 1 no Aida	"Music Junkie"	As part of Team B

=== Theatre performances ===
Title	Song	Notes	Ref.
Team K 1st Stage: Party ga Hajimaru yo	"Skirt, Hirari"	Atsuko Maeda took her place at the time	
Team K 2nd Stage: Seishun Girls	"Ame no Dōbutsuen"		
Team K 3rd Stage: Nōnai Paradise	"Kurukurupā"		
Himawari-gumi 1st Stage: Boku no Taiyō	"Idol nante Yobanaide"	Tomomi Kasai's standby	
Himawari-gumi 2nd Stage: Yume o Shina seru wake ni ikanai	"Tonari no Banana"	Tomomi Kasai's standby	
Himawari-gumi 2nd Stage: Yume o Shina seru wake ni ikanai	"Hajimete no Jellybeans"	Understudy at the time when the main members were absent	
Team K 4th Stage: Saishū Bell ga Naru	"16-ri Shimai no Uta"		
Team K 5th Stage: Gyaku Agari	"Wagamamana Nagareboshi"		
Theatre G-Rosso: Yume o Shina seru wake ni ikanai	"Bye Bye Bye"	Haruna Kojima, Moeno Nito, and Ami Maeda's standby	
Team B 5th Stage: Theater no Megami	"Locker Room Boy"		
Team B 5th Stage: Theater no Megami	"Arashi no Yoru ni wa"	Mika Komori's unit-understudy	
Team B 5th Stage: Theater no Megami	"Arashi no Yoru ni wa"	Miho Miyazaki's position and Tomu Muto's understudy	
Team B 5th Stage: Theater no Megami	"Candy"	Tomomi Kasai's position and Jurina Matsui's understudy	
SDN48 1st Stage: Yūwaku no Garter	"Yūwaku no Garter"	Sayaka Akimoto, later Mami Kato's position	
Team K Waiting Kōen II: Saishū Bell ga Naru	"19-ri Shimai no Uta"	Yuko Oshima's understudy	
Team K 7th Stage: Reset	"Ashita no tame ni Kiss o"	Haruka Shimada's understudy	
Team Surprise: Jūryoku Sympathy	"1994-nen no Raimei"	Tomomi Itano's position and Aki Takajō, later Ayaka Okada	

== Publications ==
=== Videos ===
Year	Title
2009	Kurukuru Densetsu

== Filmography ==
=== TV drama ===
Year	Title	Role	Network	Notes
2010	Majisuka Gakuen	Majusuka Gakuen student	TV Tokyo	Final episode
2011	Sakura kara no Tegami: AKB48 sorezore no Sotsugyō Monogatari	Kana Kobayashi	NTV	
2011	Majisuka Gakuen 2	Kana	TV Tokyo	Final episode
2013	So Long!		NTV	Episode 2

=== TV variety ===
Year	Title	Network	Notes	Ref.
	AKB0-ji 59-fun!	NTV	Irregular appearances	
	AKBingo!	NTV	Irregular appearances	
2008	AKB48 Neshin TV	Family Gekijo	Seasons 1 to 5, 7, and 14 and Special 2009	
	Shūkan AKB	TV Tokyo	Irregular appearances	
	Nekketsu Bo-So TV	CTC		
2011	Naruhodo! High School	NTV		
2011	AKB48 Comte: Bimyo	Hikari TV Channel		
2012	AKB48 no anta, Dare?	NotTV	Irregular appearances	
2012	Udo-chan-Kana-chan: Onayami Sōdan Honpo	Tokyo MX		
2012	Bimyona Tobira: AKB48 no Gachichare	Hikari TV Channel		
2014	Ariyoshi AKB Kyōwakoku	TBS	Irregular appearances	
2016	Tokyo Crasso!	Tokyo MX		

=== Other TV programmes ===
Year	Title	Network	Notes
	Suiensaa	NHK-E	Irregular appearances
2011	School Live Show	NHK-E	
2013	Bebop! High Heel	ABC	
2016	Koshigaya o Energetic ni o Todoke: Negisshu!!	J:Com Channel Saitama Higashi	(Note: Broadcast in J:Com Kasakube, J:Com Koshigaya, J:Com Saitama Keno, and J:Com Soka.)

=== Films ===
Year	Title	Role	Notes	Ref.
2007	Ashita no Watashi no Tsukurikata	Hinako's classmate		
2010	Re:Play-Girls	Mami		
2011	Hai! Moshimoshi, Ōtsuka Yakkyoku desu ga	Emi Nagasaku	Lead role	
2012	Ultraman Saga	Maomi Osumi		

=== Stage ===
Year	Title
2009	Shinka Episode 2
2010	Momoiro Shoten e yōkoso

=== Radio ===
Year	Title	Role	Network	Notes	Ref.
2006	Countdown Japan		Tokyo FM		
2007	AKB48: Ashita made mō chotto.		NCB	Irregular appearances	
2008	On 8		Bay FM		
2010	AKB48 no All Night Nippon		NBS		
2010	AKB48 Sayaka Akimoto-Sae Miyazawa no ukkari Channel		NCB		
2010	Radio Drama: Double Heroine	Sumiko	NCB	Episode 4	
2011	Tokyo Tower presents Diamond Veil		Tokyo FM	Saturday DJ	
2011	333 Fri. from Tokyo Tower		InterFM	Friday DJ	
2012	Kakedase!		NHK Radio 1, NHK World Radio Japan		
2012	AKB48 Amina Sato no "Konoyo ni Komoji wa irimasen!"		Radio Nippon		
2012	AKB Radio Drama Gekijō		NBS		
2012	All Night Nippon Gold		NBS		
2013	wktk Radio Gakuen		NHK Radio 1		
2013	clipclip no Onagokai		NCB		

=== Internet ===
Title	Website
Image-TV	Kodansha Moura

=== Music videos ===
Year	Title
2016	SKE48 Sae Miyazawa to Nakama-tachi "Tabi no Tochū"

=== Events ===
Year	Title
2009	A Witch's Tale
2011	Odawara Film Festival
2011	Kokusai Shinrin-toshi Symposium
2012	Kana Kobayashi no "Konya dake no o yome-san"

=== Dubbing ===
- The Lost City (Allison (Patti Harrison))

== Bibliography ==
=== Photobooks ===
Year	Title	Ref.
2009	Kana Kobayashi: Dokidoki Gravure Nyūmon!	

=== Magazine serialisations ===
Year	Title	Notes
2008	Up to boy	"Kana Kobayashi no yo no naka Nyūmon"

=== Calendars ===
Year	Title
2011	Kana Kobayashi: 2012-nen Calendar
2012	Takujō Kana Kobayashi: 2013-nen Calendar
2013	Takujō Kana Kobayashi: 2014-nen Calendar
2014	Clear File-tsuki Takujō Kana Kobayashi: 2015-nen Calendar

=== Others ===
Year	Title	Notes
2011	Tokyo Headline	Irregular
2013	Nihon Nōgyō Shinbun "Fle Marche 9-gō"	
2014	Yomiuri Kodomo Shinbun	
2014	Public Relations Koshigaya	
