= Shizuka Ōya =

Japanese idol (born 1991)

- 大家 志津香
- Born: 28 December 1991 (age 34); Fukuoka Prefecture, Japan
- Other names: Shīchan (しいちゃん, しーちゃん)
- Years active: 2008–
- Agent: Watanabe Entertainment
- Height: 1.67 m (5 ft 6 in) (2014)

Shizuka Ōya (大家 志津香, Ōya Shizuka; born 28 December 1991, in Tsuyazaki (now Fukutsu, Fukuoka), Munakata District, Fukuoka) is a Japanese idol and talent who is a former member of AKB48's Team B.

Ōya is represented with Watanabe Entertainment.

== AKB48 participation ==
=== Singles ===
Single	Song	Member of	Ref.
"Ōgoe Diamond"	"Ōgoe Diamond (Kenkyūsei ver.)"	Team Kenkyūsei	
"River"	"Hikōki Gumo"	Theater Girls	
"Ponytail to Shushu"	"Boku no Yell"	Theater Girls	
"Beginner"	"Nakeru Basho"	Diva	
"Chance no Junban"	"Kurumi to Dialogue"	Team A	
"Sakura no Ki ni Narō"	"Area K"	Diva	
"Everyday, Katyusha"	"Hito no Chikara"	Under Girls	
"Flying Get"	"Dakishimecha ikenai"	Under Girls	
"Kaze wa Fuiteiru"	"Vamos"	Under Girls Bara-gumi	
"Ue kara Mariko"	"Rinjin wa Kizutsukanai"	Team A	
"Give Me Five!"	"Jung ya Freud no Baai"	Special Girls C	
"Manatsu no Sounds Good!"	"3ttsu no Namida"	Special Girls	
"Gingham Check"	"Show fight!"	Future Girls	
"Uza"	"Seigi no Mikata janai Hero"	Team B	
"Eien Pressure"	"Eien yori Tsuzuku yō ni"	OKL48	
"So Long!"	"Sokode Inu no unchi Fun jau ka ne?"	Umeda Team B	
"Sayonara Crawl"	"Romance Kenjū"	Team B	
"Heart Electric"	"Tiny T-shirt"	Team B	
"Suzukake no Ki no Michi de "Kimi no Hohoemi o Yume ni Miru" to Itte Shimattara Bokutachi no Kankei wa Dō Kawatte Shimau no ka, Bokunari ni Nannichi ka Kangaeta Ue de no Yaya Kihazukashii Ketsuron no Yō na Mono"			
"Mae shika Mukanee"	"Konjo"	Talking Chimpanzees	
"Labrador Retriever"	"B Garden"	Team B	
"Kibōteki Refrain"	"Utaitai"	Katorea-gumi	
"Kibōteki Refrain"	"Loneliness Club"	Team B	
"Kibōteki Refrain"	"Reborn"	Team Surprise	
"Kuchibiru ni Be My Baby"	"Yasashī place"	Team A	
"Kimi wa Melody"	"M.T. ni Sasagu"	Yokoyama Team A	
"Tsubasa wa Iranai"	"Set me free"	Team A	

=== Albums ===
Title	Song	Member of
Kamikyokutachi	"Kimi to Niji to Taiyō to"	
Koko ni Ita Koto	"Overtake"	Team A
Koko ni Ita Koto	"Koko ni Ita Koto"	AKB48+SKE48+SDN48+NMB48
1830m	"Hate"	Team A
1830m	"Aozora yo: Sabishikunai ka?"	AKB48+SKE48+NMB48+HKT48
Tsugi no Ashiato	"Kanashiki Kinkyori Renai"	Team B
Koko ga Rhodes da, Koko de Tobe!	"To go de"	Kuramochi Team B
0 to 1 no Aida	"Clap"	Team A

=== Stage units ===
Title	Song	Notes
Team B 3rd Stage: Pajama Drive	"Junjō Shugi"	Back dancer; Under Rumi Yonezawa
Team A 4th Stage: Tadaima Renai-chū	"Kikyō"	Under Rina Nakanishi
Team K 4th Stage: Saishū Bell ga Naru	"Gomen ne Jewel"	Back dancer; Under Natsuki Sato
Kenkyūsei: Tadaima Renai-chū	"Kikyō"	
Team A 5th Stage: Renai Kinshi Jōrei	"Squall no Ma ni"	Back dancer
Team A 5th Stage: Renai Kinshi Jōrei	"Manatsu no Christmas Rose"	Back dancer
Team B 4th Stage: Idol no Yoake	"Kataomoi no Taikakusen"	Under Kazumi Urano
Team B 4th Stage: Idol no Yoake	"Tengoku Yarō"	Under Kazumi Urano
Kenkyūsei: Idol no Yoake	"Tengoku Yarō"	
Team K 5th Stage: Gyaku Agari	"Ai no Iro"	Under Yuka Masuda
Team K 5th Stage: Gyaku Agari	"Dakishime raretara"	Under Haruna Kojima
Theatre G-Rosso: Yume o Shina seru wake ni ikanai	"Confession"	Sayaka Akimoto and Chisato Nakata's standby
Kenkyūsei: Renai Kinshi Jōrei	"Heart Kata Virus"	
Team K 6th Stage: Reset		Under Sayaka Akimoto
Team A 6th Stage: Mokugeki-sha	"Saboten to Gold Rush"	
Team A 6th Stage: Mokugeki-sha	"Enjō Rosen"	Unit under Aki Takajo and Rino Sashihara
Team S 3rd Stage: Seifuku no Me	"Omoide Ijō"	
Team B 6th Stage: Pajama Drive	"Kagami no Naka no Jeanne d'Arc"	
Koasa Shunputei: Eve wa Adam no Rokkotsu		Despite there were no unit songs, she was in charge on centre of songs "Heavy Rotation" and "Halloween Night"
Team A 7th Stage: M.T. ni Sasagu	"Make Otoko"	
Revival Kōen: Boku no Taiyō	"Himawari"	Ayano Umeda's standby

== Filmography ==
=== Variety ===
Year	Title	Network	Notes
2009	AKBingo!	NTV	Irregular appearances
2009	Shūkan AKB	TV Tokyo	Occasional appearances
2010	Ariyoshi AKB Kyōwakoku	TBS	Irregular appearances
2010	Naruhodo! High School	NTV	
2010	AKB48 Neshin TV	Family Gekijo	
2010	AKB to ××!	YTV	Regular appearances in ×× Senbatsu from April 2011 to March 2012 (She sometimes didn't appear due to circumstances)
2011	AKB48 Conte: Bimyō	Hikari TV Channel	Occasional appearances
2011	Cream Quiz Miracle 9	TV Asahi	Regular
2012	AKB48 no anta, dare?	NotTV	Irregular appearances
2012	Gachigase	NTV	Irregular appearances
2012	AKB-ko Usagi Dōjō	TV Tokyo	Irregular appearances
2013	Saturday Night Child Machine	NTV	
2013	AKB48 Conte: Nani mo soko made...	Hikari TV Channel	Irregular appearances
2013	AKB48 Show!	NHK BS Premium	Irregular appearances
2013	Girigiri Cream Kikaku Kōjō	TV Asahi	
2014	AKB de Arbeit	Fuji TV	

=== Other TV programmes ===
Year	Title	Network	Notes
2009	Suiensaa	NHK-E	
2012	Hiruobi!	TBS	Appeared in "Hiruobi! Tenki"
2012	Mentai Waido	FBS	"Kita-kyū Isan" reporter, Natsuki Sato's standin
2016	Umi no Hunter: Same Genkai Tanken –Saikyō! Hohojiro-Tiger-Ōmejiro o Ou	BS Japan	MC with Takushi Tanaka of Ungirls

=== TV dramas ===
Year	Title	Role	Network	Notes
2010	Majisuka Gakuen	Miki	TV Tokyo	Episode 4 and Final Episode
2011	Majisuka Gakuen 2	Shizuka	TV Tokyo	Final Episode
2013	So long!		NTV	Episode 3

=== Radio ===
Year	Title	Network	Notes
2009	On 8	Bay FM	
2010	AKB48 no All Night Nippon	NBS	Irregular appearances
2010	AKB48 Ashita made mō chotto.	NCB	
2010	AKB48 no Zenryoku de Kikanakya Damejan!!	Star Digio	
2012	High Touch!	RKB	
2014	Listen? Live 4 Life	NCB	
2014	Shizuka Ōya no En Katsu	Tokyo FM	First solo personality programme (Note: The programme was called Event 80 Navi until December 2014.)

=== Stage ===
Year	Title	Role
2011	Dump Show!	Akane
2016	Tokyo	

=== Events ===
Year	Title
2012	Shizuka Ōya no Shumi no Hanashimasho

== Bibliography ==
=== Calendars ===
Year	Title
2011	Shizuka Ōya 2012-nen Calendar
2012	Takujō: Shizuka Ōya 2013-nen Calendar
2013	Takujō: Shizuka Ōya 2014-nen Calendar
2014	Clear File-tsuki Takujō: Shizuka Ōya 2015-nen Calendar
