= Koko ga Rhodes da, Koko de Tobe! =

- Type A limited edition cover

Studio album by AKB48
- Released: January 21, 2015
- Recorded: 2013–2014
- Genre: J-pop
- Length: 65:50 (Theater); 114:37 (Type A); 114:49 (Type B)
- Label: You, Be Cool! / King
- Producer: Yasushi Akimoto

AKB48 chronology
Tsugi no Ashiato (2014)	Koko ga Rhodes da, Koko de Tobe! (2015)	0 to 1 no Aida (2015)

Singles from Koko ga Rhodes da, Koko de Tobe!
- 1. "Heart Electric" Released: October 30, 2013; 2. "Suzukake no Ki no Michi de "Kimi no Hohoemi o Yume ni Miru" to Itte Shimattara Bokutachi no Kankei wa Dō Kawatte Shimau no ka, Bokunari ni Nannichi ka Kangaeta Ue de no Yaya Kihazukashii Ketsuron no Yō na Mono" Released: December 11, 2013; 3. "Mae shika Mukanee" Released: February 26, 2014; 4. "Labrador Retriever" Released: May 21, 2014; 5. "Kokoro no Placard" Released: August 27, 2014; 6. "Kibōteki Refrain" Released: November 26, 2014

Koko ga Rhodes da, Koko de Tobe! (ここがロドスだ、ここで跳べ!, Koko ga Rodosu da, Koko de Tobe!; "Here is Rhodes, jump here!") is the fourth studio album by Japanese idol girl group AKB48.

== Promotion and release ==
The album was released on January 21, 2015 under King Records in Japan, in several editions: Theater, Type A, and Type B. The Theater edition is only sold at the AKB48 theater. The Type A and Type B editions include 2 CDs, and a limited edition of Type A includes a bonus DVD.

== Track listing ==
All songs performed by AKB48 except as noted.

No.	Title	Performance	Length
1.	"Kibōteki Refrain" (希望的リフレイン)		4:53
2.	"Labrador Retriever" (ラブラドール・レトリバー)		4:55
3.	"Reborn"	Team Surprise	4:33
4.	"Suzukake no Ki no Michi de "Kimi no Hohoemi o Yume ni Miru" to Itte Shimattara Bokutachi no Kankei wa Dō Kawatte Shimau no ka, Bokunari ni Nannichi ka Kangaeta Ue de no Yaya Kihazukashii Ketsuron no Yō na Mono" (鈴懸の木の道で「君の微笑みを夢に見る」と言ってしまったら僕たちの関係はどう変わってしまうのか、僕なりに何日か考えた上でのやや気恥ずかしい結論のようなもの)		5:25
5.	"Mae shika Mukanee" (前しか向かねえ)		4:20
6.	"Kimi no Hitomi wa Planetarium" (君の瞳はプラネタリウム)	AKB48 Kenkyuusei	5:08
7.	"Futari wa Dekiteru" (2人はデキテル)	Haruna Kojima, Kenji Kitagawa	4:40
8.	"Heart Electric" (ハート・エレキ)		4:58
9.	"Kokoro no Placard" (心のプラカード)		4:06
10.	"47 no Suteki na Machi e" (47の素敵な街へ)	Team 8	4:18
11.	"Erande Rainbow" (選んでレインボー)	Tentoumu Chu!	4:18
12.	"Koi to ka..." (恋とか…)		4:39
13.	"Ai no Sonzai" (愛の存在)		3:47

Theater Edition
No.	Title	Length
14.	"Saisho no Ai no Monogatari" (最初の愛の物語)

Type A – Disc 2
No.	Title	Performance	Length
1.	"Conveyor"	Yokoyama Team K	4:10
2.	"Seijun Philosophy" (清純フィロソフィー)	Minegishi Team 4	3:45
3.	"Henachoko Support" (へなちょこサポート)	Team 8	4:16
4.	"Kanojo" (彼女)	Sakura Miyawaki	4:06
5.	"Downtown Hotel 100 Gōshitsu" (ダウンタウンホテル100号室)		3:15
6.	"Sailor Zombie" (セーラーゾンビ)	Milk Planet	4:26
7.	"Junjō Soda-sui" (純情ソーダ水)	Mayu Watanabe	4:48
8.	"Ai to Kanashimi no Jisa" (愛と悲しみの時差)	Sayaka Yamamoto	3:48
9.	"Birth"		4:42
10.	"7kai-me no "Les Mis"" (7回目の「レミゼ」)	Haruna Kojima	6:01
11.	"Oh! Baby!"	Takahashi Team A	4:15
12.	"Koko ga Rhodes da, Koko de Tobe!" (ここがロドスだ、ここで跳べ!)		4:50

Type A Limited Edition – DVD
No.	Title	Performance	Length
1.	"Jūjun na Slave" (従順なSlave)	Team A
2.	"Hajimete no Drive" (初めてのドライブ)	Team K
3.	"Loneliness Club" (ロンリネスクラブ)	Team B
4.	"Me o Aketa Mama no First Kiss" (目を開けたままのファーストキス)	Team 4
5.	"47 no Suteki na Machi e" (47の素敵な街へ)	Team 8
6.	"Reborn"	Team Surprise

Type B – Disc 2
No.	Title	Performance	Length
1.	"Bokutachi no Ideology" (僕たちのイデオロギー)		3:31
2.	"To go de" (To goで)	Kuramochi Team B	4:26
3.	"Oshiete Mommy" (教えてMommy)		4:24
4.	"Setsunai Reply" (切ないリプライ)	Rino Sashihara	4:18
5.	"Panama Unga" (パナマ運河)		4:59
6.	"Akai Pin Heel to Professor" (赤いピンヒールとプロフェッサー)	Jurina Matsui	4:09
7.	"Yowamushi Kemushi" (よわむしけむし)	Yuki Kashiwagi	4:30
8.	"Namida wa Atomawashi" (涙は後回し)	Minegishi Team 4	4:50
9.	"All of you"	Minami Takahashi	3:28
10.	"Tomodachi de Irareru Nara" (友達でいられるなら)	Haruka Shimazaki, Yui Yokoyama	4:35
11.	"Kyō Made no Melody" (今日までのメロディー)		4:50
12.	"Ikitsuzukeru" (生き続ける)		4:49

== Personnel ==
Note: This album included the couplings from Kibouteki Refrain.

=== Juujun na Slave ===
Team A: Miyabi Ino, Manami Ichikawa, Anna Iriyama, Karen Iwata, Rina Kawaei, Natsuki Kojima, Haruna Kojima, Haruka Shimazaki, Minami Takahashi, Kayoko Takita, Makiho Tatsuya, Megu Taniguchi, Chisato Nakata, Chiyori Nakanishi, Mariko Nakamura, Rena Nishiyama, Nana Fujita, Nao Furuhata, Ami Maeda, Sakiko Matsui, Sakura Miyawaki, Tomu Muto, Ayaka Morikawa, Fuuko Yagura

=== Hajimete no Drive ===
Team K: Moe Aigasa, Maria Abe, Haruka Ishida, Misaki Iwasa, Mayumi Uchida, Rie Kitahara, Mako Kojima, Haruka Kodama, Kana Kobayashi, Moe Goto, Haruka Shimada, Hinana Shimoguchi, Shihori Suzuki, Mariya Suzuki, Yuka Tano, Mariya Nagao, Jurina Matsui, Miho Miyazaki, Sayaka Yamamoto, Ami Yumoto, Yui Yokoyama

=== Loneliness Club ===
Team B: Rina Ikoma, Rina Izuta, Natsuki Uchiyama, Ayano Umeta, Ryoka Oshima, Shizuka Ōya, Nana Owada, Mayu Ogasawara, Yuki Kashiwagi, Saya Kawamoto, Asuka Kuramochi, Aki Takajo, Juri Takahashi, Miyu Takeuchi, Miku Tanabe, Mio Tomonaga, Wakana Natori, Rena Nozawa, Hikari Hashimoto, Rina Hirata, Seina Fukuoka, Aeri Yokoshima, Mayu Watanabe

=== Me wo Akete Mama no First Kiss ===
Team 4: Saho Iwatate, Rio Okawa, Miyu Omori, Ayaka Okada, Nana Okada, Rena Kato, Yuria Kizaki, Saki Kitazawa, Riho Kotani, Marina Kobayashi, Haruka Komiyama, Yukari Sasaki, Kiara Sato, Ayana Shinozaki, Nagisa Shibuya, Yurina Takashima, Mizuki Tsuchiyasu, Miki Nishino, Mitsuki Maeda, Minami Minegishi, Mion Mukaichi, Yuiri Murayama, Shinobu Mogi

=== Reborn ===
AKB48 Team Surprise

- Team A: Natsuki Kojima, Chisato Nakata, Mariko Nakamura, Ami Maeda, Sakiko Matsui, Ayaka Morikawa
- Team K: Haruka Ishida, Misaki Iwasa, Mayumi Uchida, Mariya Suzuki, Shihori Suzuki
- Team B: Rina Izuta (center), Shizuka Ōya, Miku Tanabe, Wakana Natori
- Team 4: Saho Iwatate, Marina Kobayashi, Yukari Sasaki, Ayana Shinozaki

== Release history ==
Region	Date	Format	Label
Japan	January 21, 2015	CD; digital download; streaming	King Records (YOU BE COOL division)
Hong Kong, Taiwan	January 21, 2015	CD; digital download; streaming	King Records
South Korea	July 20, 2018	digital download; streaming	Stone Music Entertainment; Genie Music; King

== Chart ==
Chart	Peak position
Oricon	1
