= 0 to 1 no Aida =

- Single Complete version cover

Compilation album by AKB48
- Released: November 18, 2015
- Recorded: 2005–2015
- Genre: J-pop
- Label: You, Be Cool! / King
- Producer: Yasushi Akimoto

AKB48 chronology
Koko ga Rhodes da, Koko de Tobe! (2015)	0 to 1 no Aida (2015)	Thumbnail (2017)

Singles from 0 to 1 no Aida
- 1. "Green Flash" Released: March 4, 2015; 2. "Bokutachi wa Tatakawanai" Released: May 20, 2015; 3. "Halloween Night" Released: August 26, 2015

0 to 1 no Aida (0と1の間; Hepburn: Zero to Ichi no Aida, Between 0 and 1) is the third compilation album from Japanese idol girl group AKB48, released on November 18, 2015. This album marks the tenth anniversary of the group, and contains a compilation of their top singles as well as an assortment of bonus tracks. This is the last album to feature long-time member and former AKB48 general director Minami Takahashi.

== Overview ==
The seventh AKB48 album was announced in September 2015, during an event, and will be a special compilation to celebrate the tenth anniversary of the Japanese idol group and the departure, or "graduation" of long-time member and former AKB48 general director Minami Takahashi.

The album was released in three versions:

- No. 1 Singles and Million Singles are two-CD editions which compile all of the groups' singles that have reached the #1 position on the Oricon charts plus three new tracks and all singles which have sold more than a million copies plus six new tracks respectively.
- Complete Singles is a three-CD bundle which includes every single released up to date (both indie singles "Sakura no Hanabiratachi" and "Skirt, Hirari" are presented in newly remixed versions) plus three new tracks and a bonus DVD.
- The Theater Edition features the same track list as Million Singles with the exception of the last three tracks, which are replaced by two new songs by sub-units Tentoumu Chu! and Dendenmu Chu!.

== Track listing ==
All tracks written by Yasushi Akimoto.

=== No. 1 Singles ===
Disc one
No.	Title	Music	Arrangement	Length
1.	"River"	Yoshimasa Inoue	Yoshimasa Inoue	4:43
2.	"Sakura no Shiori"	Hiroshi Uesugi	Kenichi Mitsuda	4:01
3.	"Ponytail to Shushu"	Shinya Tada	Mashin Ikuta	4:31
4.	"Heavy Rotation"	Yō Yamazaki	Yūsuke Yamada	4:42
5.	"Beginner"	Yoshimasa Inoue	Yoshimasa Inoue	4:00
6.	"Chance no Junban"	Yūko Konishi	Mashin Ikuta	4:16
7.	"Sakura no Ki ni Narō"	Kensuke Yoko	Yūichi "Masa" Nonaka	5:29
8.	"Everyday, Katyusha"	Yoshimasa Inoue	Yoshimasa Inoue	5:12
9.	"Flying Get"	Shinya Sumida	Mashin Ikuta	4:13
10.	"Kaze wa Fuiteiru"	Mineaki Kawahara	Mineaki Kawahara; Yūichi "Masa" Nonaka	3:39
11.	"Ue kara Mariko"	Masahiro Kawaura	Mashin Ikuta	4:37
12.	"Give Me Five!"	Daisuke Sasabuchi	Yūichi "Masa" Nonaka	4:37
13.	"Manatsu no Sounds good!"	Yoshimasa Inoue	Yoshimasa Inoue	4:35
14.	"Gingham Check"	Yūsuke Itagaki	Yūsuke Itagaki	5:27
15.	"Uza"	Yoshimasa Inoue	Yoshimasa Inoue	4:40
16.	"Eien Pressure"	Manabu Marutani	Makoto Wakatabe	4:53

Disc two
No.	Title	Music	Arrangement	Length
1.	"So long!"	Shingo Kujime	Yūichi "Masa" Nonaka	6:04
2.	"Sayonara Crawl"	Kazunori Watanabe	Seiji Mutō	4:56
3.	"Koisuru Fortune Cookie"	Shintarō Itō	Seiji Mutō	4:46
4.	"Heart Electric"	Manabu Marutani	Takeshi Masuda	4:58
5.	"Suzukake no Ki no Michi de "Kimi no Hohoemi o Yume ni Miru" to Itte Shimattara Bokutachi no Kankei wa Dō Kawatte Shimau no ka, Bokunari ni Nannichi ka Kangaeta Ue de no Yaya Kihazukashii Ketsuron no Yō na Mono"	Tetsurō Oda	Yūichi "Masa" Nonaka	5:25
6.	"Mae shika Mukanee"	Yasuyuki Kojō	Yūsuke Itagaki	4:20
7.	"Labrador Retriever"	Manabu Marutani	Hiroshi Sasaki	4:55
8.	"Kokoro no Placard"	Yūsuke Itagaki	Seiji Mutō	4:06
9.	"Kibouteki Refrain"	Yoshimasa Inoue	Yoshimasa Inoue	4:53
10.	"Green Flash"	Carlos K.	Hiroshi Sasaki	4:31
11.	"Bokutachi wa Tatakawanai"	Yo-Hey	Hiroshi Sasaki	5:26
12.	"Halloween Night"	Yoshimasa Inoue	Yoshimasa Inoue	5:06
13.	"Yasashiku Aritai" (やさしくありたい^{?}) (Yuki Kashiwagi, Rino Sashihara)	Shintarō Itō	Shintarō Itō	3:50
14.	"Toy Poodle to Kimi no Monogatari" (トイプードルと君の物語^{?}) (Haruka Shimazaki, Jurina Matsui)	Amber	Hiroshi Sasaki	4:54
15.	"Ano Koro, Suki datta Hito" (あの頃、好きだった人^{?}) (Haruna Kojima, Yui Yokoyama)	say-ta; Mizuki Kamada	Makoto Wakatabe	4:24

=== Million Singles ===
Disc one
No.	Title	Music	Arrangement	Length
1.	"Beginner"	Yoshimasa Inoue	Yoshimasa Inoue	4:00
2.	"Sakura no Ki ni Narō"	Kensuke Yoko	Yūichi "Masa" Nonaka	5:29
3.	"Everyday, Katyusha"	Yoshimasa Inoue	Yoshimasa Inoue	5:12
4.	"Flying Get"	Shinya Sumida	Mashin Ikuta	4:13
5.	"Kaze wa Fuiteiru"	Mineaki Kawahara	Mineaki Kawahara; Yūichi "Masa" Nonaka	3:39
6.	"Ue kara Mariko"	Masahiro Kawaura	Mashin Ikuta	4:37
7.	"Give Me Five!"	Daisuke Sasabuchi	Yūichi "Masa" Nonaka	4:37
8.	"Manatsu no Sounds good!"	Yoshimasa Inoue	Yoshimasa Inoue	4:35
9.	"Gingham Check"	Yūsuke Itagaki	Yūsuke Itagaki	5:27
10.	"Uza"	Yoshimasa Inoue	Yoshimasa Inoue	4:40
11.	"Eien Pressure"	Manabu Marutani	Makoto Wakatabe	4:53
12.	"So long!"	Shingo Kujime	Yūichi "Masa" Nonaka	6:04
13.	"Sayonara Crawl"	Kazunori Watanabe	Seiji Mutō	4:56
14.	"Koisuru Fortune Cookie"	Shintarō Itō	Seiji Mutō	4:46
15.	"Heart Electric"	Manabu Marutani	Takeshi Masuda	4:58

Disc two
No.	Title	Music	Arrangement	Length
1.	"Suzukake no Ki no Michi de "Kimi no Hohoemi o Yume ni Miru" to Itte Shimattara Bokutachi no Kankei wa Dō Kawatte Shimau no ka, Bokunari ni Nannichi ka Kangaeta Ue de no Yaya Kihazukashii Ketsuron no Yō na Mono"	Tetsurō Oda	Yūichi "Masa" Nonaka	5:25
2.	"Mae shika Mukanee"	Yasuyuki Kojō	Yūsuke Itagaki	4:20
3.	"Labrador Retriever"	Manabu Marutani	Hiroshi Sasaki	4:55
4.	"Kokoro no Placard"	Yūsuke Itagaki	Seiji Mutō	4:06
5.	"Kibouteki Refrain"	Yoshimasa Inoue	Yoshimasa Inoue	4:53
6.	"Green Flash"	Carlos K.	Hiroshi Sasaki	4:31
7.	"Bokutachi wa Tatakawanai"	Yo-Hey	Hiroshi Sasaki	5:26
8.	"Halloween Night"	Yoshimasa Inoue	Yoshimasa Inoue	5:06
9.	"Clap" (Team A)	YUMA	YUMA	4:19
10.	"Ai no Shisha" (愛の使者^{?}; Team K)	HiBiKi	HiBiKi	4:29
11.	"Music Junkie" (ミュージックジャンキー^{?}; Team B)	Yukitaka Kanetsuki	Yukitaka Kanetsuki	3:49
12.	"Nakigoto Time" (泣き言タイム^{?}; Team 4)	Daisuke Toyama	Daisuke Toyama; NINO	4:44
13.	"Isshō no Aida ni Nannin to Deaeru no darou" (一生の間に何人と出逢えるのだろう^{?}; Team 8)	Keiichi Kondō	Yūichi "Masa" Nonaka	4:44
14.	"Love Ash" (Minami Takahashi, Sayaka Yamamoto)	Carlos K.; Keyz	Carlos K.	4:35

=== Complete Singles ===
Disc one
No.	Title	Music	Arrangement	Length
1.	"Sakura no Hanabiratachi" (2015 best ver.)	Hiroshi Uesugi	Nobuhiko Kashiwara	5:18
2.	"Skirt, Hirari" (2015 best ver.)	Mio Okada	Atsushi Umebori	4:04
3.	"Aitakatta"	Bounceback	Tomonori Taguchi; Haruo Inatome	3:49
4.	"Seifuku ga Jama wo Suru"	Yoshimasa Inoue	Yoshimasa Inoue	4:45
5.	"Keibetsu Shiteita Aijou"	Yoshimasa Inoue	Yoshimasa Inoue	4:17
6.	"Bingo!"	Hideki Naruse	Tetsuya Ōuchi	4:11
7.	"Boku no Taiyou"	Yoshimasa Inoue	Yoshimasa Inoue	4:54
8.	"Yūhi wo Miteiru ka?"	Mio Okada	Tomoaki Takashima	4:54
9.	"Romance, Irane"	Rie	CHOKKAKU	4:42
10.	"Sakura no Hanabiratachi 2008"	Hiroshi Uesugi	Nobuhiko Kashiwara	5:20
11.	"Baby! Baby! Baby!"	Hiroshi Uesugi	Chokkaku	4:02
12.	"Ōgoe Diamond"	Yoshimasa Inoue	Yoshimasa Inoue	4:08
13.	"Jūnen Zakura"	Yoshimasa Inoue	Yoshimasa Inoue	4:15
14.	"Namida Surprise!"	Yoshimasa Inoue	Yoshimasa Inoue	4:42
15.	"Iiwake Maybe"	Shunryū	Yūichi "Masa" Nonaka	4:10

Disc two
No.	Title	Music	Arrangement	Length
1.	"River"	Yoshimasa Inoue	Yoshimasa Inoue	4:43
2.	"Sakura no Shiori"	Hiroshi Uesugi	Kenichi Mitsuda	4:01
3.	"Ponytail to Chouchou"	Shinya Tada	Mashin Ikuta	4:31
4.	"Heavy Rotation"	Yō Yamazaki	Yūsuke Yamada	4:42
5.	"Beginner"	Yoshimasa Inoue	Yoshimasa Inoue	4:00
6.	"Chance no Junban"	Yūko Konishi	Mashin Ikuta	4:16
7.	"Sakura no Ki ni Narō"	Kensuke Yoko	Yūichi "Masa" Nonaka	5:29
8.	"Everyday, Katyusha"	Yoshimasa Inoue	Yoshimasa Inoue	5:12
9.	"Flying Get"	Shinya Sumida	Mashin Ikuta	4:13
10.	"Kaze wa Fuiteiru"	Mineaki Kawahara	Mineaki Kawahara; Yūichi "Masa" Nonaka	3:39
11.	"Ue kara Mariko"	Masahiro Kawaura	Mashin Ikuta	4:37
12.	"Give Me Five!"	Daisuke Sasabuchi	Yūichi "Masa" Nonaka	4:37
13.	"Manatsu no Sounds good!"	Yoshimasa Inoue	Yoshimasa Inoue	4:35
14.	"Gingham Check"	Yūsuke Itagaki	Yūsuke Itagaki	5:27
15.	"Uza"	Yoshimasa Inoue	Yoshimasa Inoue	4:40
16.	"Eien Pressure"	Manabu Marutani	Makoto Wakatabe	4:53

Disc three
No.	Title	Music	Arrangement	Length
1.	"So long!"	Shingo Kujime	Yūichi "Masa" Nonaka	6:04
2.	"Sayonara Crawl"	Kazunori Watanabe	Seiji Mutō	4:56
3.	"Koisuru Fortune Cookie"	Shintarō Itō	Seiji Mutō	4:46
4.	"Heart Electric"	Manabu Marutani	Takeshi Masuda	4:58
5.	"Suzukake no Ki no Michi de "Kimi no Hohoemi o Yume ni Miru" to Itte Shimattara Bokutachi no Kankei wa Dō Kawatte Shimau no ka, Bokunari ni Nannichi ka Kangaeta Ue de no Yaya Kihazukashii Ketsuron no Yō na Mono"	Tetsurō Oda	Yūichi "Masa" Nonaka	5:25
6.	"Mae shika Mukanee"	Yasuyuki Kojō	Yūsuke Itagaki	4:20
7.	"Labrador Retriever"	Manabu Marutani	Hiroshi Sasaki	4:55
8.	"Kokoro no Placard"	Yūsuke Itagaki	Seiji Mutō	4:06
9.	"Kibouteki Refrain"	Yoshimasa Inoue	Yoshimasa Inoue	4:53
10.	"Green Flash"	Carlos K.	Hiroshi Sasaki	4:31
11.	"Bokutachi wa Tatakawanai"	Yo-Hey	Hiroshi Sasaki	5:26
12.	"Halloween Night"	Yoshimasa Inoue	Yoshimasa Inoue	5:06
13.	"Christmas Eve ni Nakanai You ni" (クリスマスイブに泣かないように^{?}; Sakura Miyawaki, Mayu Watanabe)	Yūichi Ichikawa	Yūichi Ichikawa	5:05
14.	"Hajimari no Yuki" (始まりの雪^{?}; Yūka Tano, Tomu Mutō, Ryoka Oshima, Juri Takahashi)	Dr. Lilcom	Dr. Lilcom	4:25
15.	"Rosario" (ロザリオ^{?}; Anna Iriyama, Haruka Kodama, Rena Katō, Yuria Kizaki)	Shin Hasegawa	Mashin Ikuta	4:21

DVD
No.	Title	Length
1.	"AKB48 Group Members Air Handshake Event 2015" (AKB48グループメンバー エア握手会2015^{?})
2.	"DECADE ~AKB48: Path of 10 Years~" (DECADE ～AKB48 10年の軌跡～^{?})

=== Theater Edition ===
Disc one
No.	Title	Music	Arrangement	Length
1.	"Beginner"	Yoshimasa Inoue	Yoshimasa Inoue	4:00
2.	"Sakura no Ki ni Narō"	Kensuke Yoko	Yūichi "Masa" Nonaka	5:29
3.	"Everyday, Katyusha"	Yoshimasa Inoue	Yoshimasa Inoue	5:12
4.	"Flying Get"	Shinya Sumida	Mashin Ikuta	4:13
5.	"Kaze wa Fuiteiru"	Mineaki Kawahara	Mineaki Kawahara; Yūichi "Masa" Nonaka	3:39
6.	"Ue kara Mariko"	Masahiro Kawaura	Mashin Ikuta	4:37
7.	"Give Me Five!"	Daisuke Sasabuchi	Yūichi "Masa" Nonaka	4:37
8.	"Manatsu no Sounds good!"	Yoshimasa Inoue	Yoshimasa Inoue	4:35
9.	"Gingham Check"	Yūsuke Itagaki	Yūsuke Itagaki	5:27
10.	"Uza"	Yoshimasa Inoue	Yoshimasa Inoue	4:40
11.	"Eien Pressure"	Manabu Marutani	Makoto Wakatabe	4:53
12.	"So long!"	Shingo Kujime	Yūichi "Masa" Nonaka	6:04
13.	"Sayonara Crawl"	Kazunori Watanabe	Seiji Mutō	4:56
14.	"Koisuru Fortune Cookie"	Shintarō Itō	Seiji Mutō]	4:46
15.	"Heart Electric"	Manabu Marutani	Takeshi Masuda	4:58

Disc two
No.	Title	Music	Arrangement	Length
1.	"Suzukake no Ki no Michi de "Kimi no Hohoemi o Yume ni Miru" to Itte Shimattara Bokutachi no Kankei wa Dō Kawatte Shimau no ka, Bokunari ni Nannichi ka Kangaeta Ue de no Yaya Kihazukashii Ketsuron no Yō na Mono"	Tetsurō Oda	Yūichi "Masa" Nonaka	5:25
2.	"Mae shika Mukanee"	Yasuyuki Kojō	Yūsuke Itagaki	4:20
3.	"Labrador Retriever"	Manabu Marutani	Hiroshi Sasaki	4:55
4.	"Kokoro no Placard"	Yūsuke Itagaki	Seiji Mutō	4:06
5.	"Kibouteki Refrain"	Yoshimasa Inoue	Yoshimasa Inoue	4:53
6.	"Green Flash"	Carlos K.	Hiroshi Sasaki	4:31
7.	"Bokutachi wa Tatakawanai"	Yo-Hey	Hiroshi Sasaki	5:26
8.	"Halloween Night"	Yoshimasa Inoue	Yoshimasa Inoue	5:06
9.	"TentoumuChu! o Sagase!" (てんとうむChu!を探せ!) (Tentoumu Chu!)	Hizashi	Makoto Wakatabe	4:19
10.	"Are kara Boku wa Benkyou ga Te ni Tsukanai" (あれから僕は勉強が手につかない^{?}) (Dendenmu Chu!)	Daisuke Toyama	Mashin Ikuta	4:29

== Release history ==
Region	Date	Format	Label
Japan	November 18, 2015	CD; digital download; streaming	King Records (YOU BE COOL division)
Hong Kong, Taiwan	November 18, 2015	CD; digital download; streaming	King Records

== Chart ==
Chart	Peak position
Japan (Oricon)	1
