= 1830m =

- Regular Edition Front Cover

Studio album by AKB48
- Released: August 15, 2012
- Genre: J-pop
- Label: You, Be Cool! / King
- Producer: Yasushi Akimoto

AKB48 chronology
Koko ni Ita Koto (2011)	1830m (2012)	Tsugi no Ashiato (2014)

Singles from 1830m
- 1. "Sakura no Ki ni Narō" Released: February 16, 2011; 2. "Everyday, Katyusha" Released: May 25, 2011; 3. "Flying Get" Released: August 24, 2011; 4. "Kaze wa Fuiteiru" Released: October 26, 2011; 5. "Ue kara Mariko" Released: December 7, 2011; 6. "Give Me Five!" Released: February 15, 2012

Professional ratings
Review scores
Source	Rating
Rolling Stone Japan	3.5/5 stars

1830m (Sen Happyaku Sanjū Mētoru; "One Thousand Eight Hundred Thirty Meters") is the second studio album (fourth overall) by the Japanese female idol group AKB48. It is a double-album release and was released in Japan on August 15, 2012 by King Records. It sold 1,051,000 copies.

== Album information ==
The title 1830m reflects the distance from AKB48 Theater in Akihabara to Tokyo Dome, an indoor baseball stadium with over-50,000 capacity where AKB48 had performed for the first time, from August 24 to 26, 2012. It was released in two editions, a regular edition in a special box with a 48-page photobook, a bonus DVD, and a random photo, and a theater edition with 14 alternate covers, a handshake event ticket, and a photo of an AKB48/SKE48/NMB48/HKT48 member chosen at random.

This is the last album to feature Team A member and the group's ace Atsuko Maeda.

== Reception ==
The album debuted at number one in the Oricon weekly album charts. In August 2012, the album was certified Million by the Recording Industry Association of Japan.

== Senbatsu ==
Promotional picture (21 members):

- Team A: Haruna Kojima, Mariko Shinoda, Aki Takajo, Minami Takahashi, Atsuko Maeda
- Team K: Tomomi Itano, Ayaka Umeda, Yuko Oshima, Minami Minegishi, Sae Miyazawa, Yui Yokoyama
- Team B: Tomomi Kasai, Yuki Kashiwagi, Rie Kitahara, Mayu Watanabe
- Team 4: Haruka Shimazaki
- Team S: Jurina Matsui, Rena Matsui
- Team N: Sayaka Yamamoto, Miyuki Watanabe
- Team H: Rino Sashihara

== Track listing ==
CD1 contains the following first-time studio recordings, which have all been performed on team stages: "First Rabbit", "Miniskirt no Yōsei", "Lemon no Toshigoro", "Ren'ai Sōsenkyo", "Romance Kakurenbo" and B-sides which only appeared on theater editions of their singles which are "Jung ya Freud no Baai" (from "Give Me Five!"), "Hashire! Penguin" (from "Ue kara Mariko"), "Yasai Uranai" (from "Flying Get"), Anti (from "Everyday, Katyusha"), "Ōgon Center" (from "Sakura no Ki ni Narō") and "Tsubomitachi" (from "Kaze wa Fuiteiru").

CD2 contains sixteen new songs, plus Atsuko Maeda's solo version of "Sakura no Hanabiratachi"

=== Regular Edition ===
CD disc 1
No.	Title	Artist(s) (Senbatsu)	Length
1.	"First Rabbit" (ファースト・ラビット Fāsto Rabitto)	Haruna Kojima, Mariko Shinoda, Aki Takajō, Minami Takahashi, Atsuko Maeda, Tomomi Itano, Yūko Ōshima, Minami Minegishi, Yui Yokoyama, Yuki Kashiwagi, Rie Kitahara, Mayu Watanabe, Mina Ōba, Haruka Shimazaki, Suzuran Yamauchi, Rino Sashihara	4:49
2.	"Ōgon Center" (黄金センター "Golden Center")	Team Kenkyūsei	3:50
3.	"Miniskirt no Yōsei" (ミニスカートの妖精 "Miniskirted Fairy")	Rina Izuta, Erena Saeed Yokota, Rina Hirata	3:59
4.	"Ue kara Mariko" (上からマリコ "Mariko from Above")		4:39
5.	"Anti" (アンチ)	Team Kenkyūsei	4:11
6.	"Lemon no Toshigoro" (檸檬の年頃 "Lemon Puberty")	Marina Kobayashi, Wakana Natori, Yukari Sasaki, Tomu Mutō	4:00
7.	"Ren'ai Sōsenkyo" (恋愛総選挙 "General Election of Love")	YM7 (Aki Takajō, Tomomi Kasai, Mika Komori, Sumire Satō, Miho Miyazaki, Miyu Takeuchi, Rino Sashihara)	3:32
8.	"Yasai Uranai" (野菜占い "Vegetable Fortune-telling")	Yasai Sisters	3:51
9.	"Everyday, Katyusha" (Everyday、カチューシャ "Everyday, Alice Band')		5:14
10.	"Hashire! Penguin" (走れ!ペンギン "Run! Penguin")		4:04
11.	"Romance Kakurenbo" (ロマンスかくれんぼ "Romance Hide-and-seek")	Miyū Ōmori	3:25
12.	"Tsubomitachi" (蕾たち "Flower Buds")	Team 4 + Kenkyūsei	3:43
13.	"Jung ya Freud no Baai" (ユングやフロイトの場合 "Jung or Freud's Case")	Special Girls C	4:29
14.	"Flying Get" (フライングゲット "Flying Target")		4:16
15.	"Kaze wa Fuiteiru" (風は吹いている "Wind Is Blowing")		3:42
16.	"Sakura no Ki ni Narō" (桜の木になろう "Let's Become Cherry Blossom Trees")		5:31
17.	"Give Me Five!" (GIVE ME FIVE!)		5:00

CD disc 2
No.	Title	Artist(s) (Senbatsu)	Length
1.	"Hate"	Shinoda Team A	3:06
2.	"Plastic no Kuchibiru" (プラスティックの唇 "Plastic Lips")	Mariko Shinoda	4:10
3.	"Omoide no Hotondo" (思い出のほとんど "Most Memories")	Minami Takahashi, Atsuko Maeda	6:43
4.	"Iede no Yoru" (家出の夜 "Night of Running Away from Home")	Oshima Team K	4:51
5.	"Scandalous ni Ikō" (スキャンダラスに行こう "Go Scandalous")	Haruna Kojima, Yūko Ōshima	3:24
6.	"Nō Kan" (ノーカン "No Count")	Umeda Team B	4:20
7.	"Abogado Ja nē Shi..." (アボガドじゃね〜し･･･ "Not Abogado, Though")	Mayu Watanabe, Rino Sashihara	4:00
8.	"Chokkaku Sunshine" (直角Sunshine "Right Angle Sunshine")	Ōba Team 4	3:59
9.	"Bokutachi wa Ima Hanashiau Beki Nan Da" (僕たちは 今 話し合うべきなんだ "We Should Discuss Now")	Tomomi Itano, Yuki Kashiwagi	4:24
10.	"Sakuranbo to Kodoku" (さくらんぼと孤独 "Cherry Fruit and Solitude")	Kenkyūsei	4:40
11.	"Daiji na Jikan" (大事な時間 "Precious Time")	Haruna Kojima, Mariko Shinoda, Minami Takahashi, Atsuko Maeda, Tomomi Itano, Yūko Ōshima, Yuki Kashiwagi, Mayu Watanabe	3:57
12.	"Itsuka Mita Umi no Soko" (いつか見た海の底 "Sea Bottom Seen Once")	Up-and-coming Girls (Mayu Watanabe, Anna Iriyama, Rena Katō, Rina Kawaei, Haruka Shimazaki, Ryōka Ōshima, Yuria Kizaki, Jurina Matsui, Kumi Yagami, Kanon Kimoto, Nana Yamada, Miyuki Watanabe, Eriko Jō, Haruka Kodama, Yūko Sugamoto, Sakura Miyawaki)
13.	"Gū Gū Onaka" (ぐ〜ぐ〜おなか "My Rumbling Stomach")	Misaki Iwasa, Atsuko Maeda, Ami Maeda, Moeno Nito, Reina Fujie, Haruka Ishida, Mika Komori, Amina Sato, Sumire Satō	4:03
14.	"Yasashisa no Chizu" (やさしさの地図 "Map of Kindness")	Mariko Shinoda, Minami Takahashi, Yui Yokoyama, Yuki Kashiwagi, Anna Iriyama, Rena Katō, Haruka Shimazaki, Yuria Kizaki, Eriko Jō, Haruka Kodama	4:28
15.	"Itterasshai" (行ってらっしゃい "Have a Nice Day")	Haruna Kojima, Mariko Shinoda, Aki Takajo, Minami Takahashi, Atsuko Maeda, Tomomi Itano, Yūko Ōshima, Minami Minegishi, Yui Yokoyama, Yuki Kashiwagi, Mayu Watanabe	5:29
16.	"Aozora yo Sabishikunai Ka?" (青空よ 寂しくないか? "Aren't You Lonely, Blue Sky?")	AKB48 + SKE48 + NMB48 + HKT48
17.	"Sakura no Hanabira (Atsuko Maeda Solo Ver.)" (桜の花びら〜前田敦子 solo ver.〜 "Cherry Blossom Petals")	Atsuko Maeda	5:24

DVD
No.	Title	Length
1.	"Everyday, Katyusha"
2.	"Flying Get"	2:35
3.	"Kaze wa Fuiteiru"
4.	"Ue kara Mariko"

The DVD contains a set of 2:30 choreography videos (different angles, etc.) for each of the 4 songs.

=== Theater Edition ===
CD disc 1

Same as on the Regular Edition

CD disc 2

13 tracks, same as on the Regular Edition minus 4 commercial tie-up tracks: "Daiji na Jikan", "Gū Gū Onaka", "Yasashisa no Chizu", and "Itterasshai".

== Charts ==
=== Weekly charts ===
Chart (2012)	Peak position
Japanese Albums (Oricon)	1

=== Monthly charts ===
Chart (2012)	Peak position
Japanese Albums (Oricon)	1

=== Year-end charts ===
Chart (2012)	Position
Japanese Albums (Oricon)	3

== Sales and certifications ==
Region	Certification	Certified units/sales
Japan (RIAJ)	Million	1,042,879

== Release history ==
Region	Date	Format	Label
Japan	August 15, 2012	CD; digital download; streaming	King Records (YOU BE COOL division)
Hong Kong, Taiwan	August 15, 2012	CD; digital download; streaming	King Records
South Korea	August 3, 2018	digital download; streaming	Stone Music Entertainment; Genie Music; King
