= Koko ni Ita Koto =

- Regular Edition cover

Studio album by AKB48
- Released: June 8, 2011
- Recorded: 2010–2011
- Genre: J-pop; dance; electronica; hip hop
- Length: 69:27
- Label: You, Be Cool! / King
- Producer: Yasushi Akimoto

AKB48 chronology
Set List: Greatest Songs Kanzenban (2010)	Koko ni Ita Koto (2011)	1830m (2012)

Singles from Koko ni Ita Koto
- 1. "Ponytail to Chouchou" Released: May 26, 2010; 2. "Heavy Rotation" Released: August 18, 2010; 3. "Beginner" Released: October 27, 2010; 4. "Chance no Junban" Released: December 8, 2010

Music videos
- "Ponytail to Chouchou" on YouTube
- "Heavy Rotation" on YouTube
- "Beginner" on YouTube
- "Chance no Junban" on YouTube

Alternative cover
- Limited Edition cover

Alternative cover
- Theater Edition cover

Koko ni Ita Koto (ここにいたこと; "We Were Here") is the debut studio album (third overall) by the Japanese idol girl group AKB48. "Koko ni Ita Koto" was released in Japan on June 8, 2011, by King Records. There are three versions available: Limited Edition (catalog number KIZC-90117/8), Regular Edition (KIZC-117/8), and Theater Edition (NKCD-6546).

While all the group's albums had been almost entirely collections of previously released material, "Koko ni Ita Koto" took a different approach. Although it featured four 2010 hits, one theatre stage song, and a theme from an early 2011 movie, the rest were new songs.

It met with great commercial success, topping the Oricon Weekly Albums Chart and, with just one week of sales, placed second in the list of best selling albums of the first half of 2011 in Japan. In the same month, it was already certified Million by the Recording Industry Association of Japan for shipments of over one million copies. The IFPI ranked it as the 42nd best-selling album worldwide in 2011.

== Background ==
The upcoming release of the first AKB48's original album was announced on February 21, 2011. The then-unnamed album would be released on April 6, 2011, and contain the hits "Ponytail to Chouchou", "Heavy Rotation", "Beginner", and "Chance no Junban", the rest being new songs. In addition to a regular edition, there would be a limited edition of the album and a theater edition. The limited edition would contain a 100-page photobook shot by photographer Mika Ninagawa, who was the director of their Heavy Rotation music video, a DVD, lottery entry card to win a special present from the band and also comes with a photo in 14 types, while the regular came with 14 alternate changeable covers featuring them in circus costumes and also the DVD which was featured in limited edition and the theater edition would be a CD-only version coming with 14 alternate changeable covers featuring them in school uniforms, a handshake event ticket and a photo of an AKB48 member chosen at random.

More details were announced at a group's handshake event on March 5, 2011. 11 of 16 songs on the album would be completely new. "Shōjotachi yo", the theme song for AKB48's movie Documentary of AKB48 to be continued, would also be on the album. On the title track AKB48 would be joined by the sister groups SKE48, SDN48, and NMB48.

Due to the 2011 Tohoku earthquake and tsunami, the album's release date was pushed back to June 8, 2011. Part of the revenues from it goes to the victims of the disaster. Also, handshakes and photos with the group members, that were planned to be a theater edition bonus, were replaced by the right to choose 5 member photos.

== Reception ==
=== Critical reception ===
James Hadfield of the Tokyo edition of Time Out gave the album zero out of five stars, calling it "wrenchingly awful", and compared it "perhaps to hearing Alvin and the Chipmunks play Stevie Wonder's 'Happy Birthday' on repeat for an equivalent length of time while being force-fed candy floss until your stomach splits open. ... It's J-pop that's been infantilised, reduced to the level of kindergarten songs. That half of the tracks are wedded to the same pachinko four-four beat serves merely to make it all the more deadening."

Another review expressed that it's hard to experience the full album since half of the songs are bland to him. However, some of the songs are still highly praised. "Beginner" was described as "freaking cool" and gave ten out of ten stars. "Heavy Rotation" is "perfect pop goodness" and "really awesome", etc. An editor from Selective Hearing wrote that "the music is also fun to listen to and for me that's what counts the most."

=== Commercial performance ===
Koko ni Ita Koto was sold in 601,985 copies in its debut week, topping the Oricon Weekly Albums Chart. In June 2011, the album was certified Million by the Recording Industry Association of Japan for shipments of over one million copies.

== Track listing ==
=== CD ===
All lyrics are written by Yasushi Akimoto.

CD
No.	Title	Music	Artist(s)	Length
1.	"Shōjotachi yo" (少女たちよ "Girls")	Jun Koami		4:33
2.	"Overtake"	Sho Shibata	Takahashi Team A	4:44
3.	"Boku ni Dekiru Koto" (僕にできること "What I Can Do")	SOHO	Akimoto Team K	4:09
4.	"Ren'ai Circus" (恋愛サーカス "Love Circus")	Osamu Masaki	Kashiwagi Team B	3:37
5.	"Kaze no Yukue" (風の行方 "Direction of the Wind")	Takamitsu Shimazaki	Asuka Kuramochi; Rino Sashihara; Minami Takahashi; Yūko Ōshima; Minami Minegishi; Yuki Kashiwagi	5:07
6.	"Wagamama Collection" (わがままコレクション "Selfish Collection")	Takamitsu Shimazaki	Aika Ōta; Ami Maeda; Mika Komori; Sumire Satō; Mayu Watanabe; Jurina Matsui	4:53
7.	"Ningyo no Vacances" (人魚のバカンス "Mermaid's Vacances")	Okishishi Ueda	Aki Takajō; Moeno Nitō; Yui Yokoyama; Tomomi Kasai; Rie Kitahara; Amina Satō; Yuka Masuda	4:00
8.	"Kimi to Boku no Kankei" (君と僕の関係 "My Relationship with You")	DR. OWL, RAY. M	Atsuko Maeda; Tomomi Itano	3:02
9.	"Iikagen no Susume" (イイカゲンのススメ "Encouragement to Be Irresponsible")	Sho Watanabe	Haruka Katayama; Haruna Kojima; Mariko Shinoda; Sayaka Akimoto; Sae Miyazawa; Rena Matsui	4:30
10.	"High School Days" (High school days)	Takeshi Toriumi	Team Kenkyūsei	4:36
11.	"Team B Oshi" (チームB推し "Team B Fan")	Takao Yoshino	Team B	4:28
12.	"Chance no Junban"	Hiroko Konishi		4:19
13.	"Beginner"	Yoshimasa Inoue		3:58
14.	"Ponytail to Shushu"	Shinya Tada		4:29
15.	"Heavy Rotation"	Yamazaki		4:43
16.	"Koko ni Ita Koto" (ここにいたこと "We Were Here")	KIS	AKB48; SKE48; SDN48; NMB48	4:11

=== Limited Edition DVD ===
DVD
No.	Title	Length
1.	"Ponytail to Chouchou" (choreography videos)	4:29
2.	"Heavy Rotation" (choreography videos)	4:40
3.	"Beginner" (choreography videos)	3:57
4.	"Chance no Junban" (choreography videos)	4:17

== Bonuses ==
=== Limited Edition ===
- 100-page photobook by Mika Ninagawa
- Photo of a member (randomly chosen from a set of 14)
- AKB48 special present lottery ticket

=== Regular Edition ===
- Set of 14 circus clothes alternate covers (7 double-sided pictures)

=== Theater Edition ===
- Set of 14 school uniform alternate covers (7 double-sided pictures)
- 5 solo member photos (customer selectable from a set of 2100)

== Charts ==
=== Weekly charts ===
Chart (2011)	Peak position
Japanese Albums (Oricon)	1

=== Monthly charts ===
Chart (2011)	Peak position
Japanese Albums (Oricon)	1

=== Year-end charts ===
Chart (2011)	Position
Japanese Albums (Oricon)	2

== Sales and certifications ==
Region	Certification	Certified units/sales
Japan (RIAJ)	Million	883,267

== Release history ==
Region	Date	Format	Label
Japan	June 8, 2011	CD; digital download; streaming	King Records (You Be Cool division)
Hong Kong	June 8, 2011	CD; digital download; streaming	King Records
Taiwan	June 8, 2011	CD; digital download; streaming	King Records
South Korea	August 3, 2018	digital download; streaming	Stone Music Entertainment; Genie Music; King
