= Meshibana Deka Tachibana =

Japanese manga and television series

めしばな刑事タチバナ (meshibana deka tachibana)
- Manga
- Written by: Sabei Sakado
- Illustrated by: Tori Tabii
- Published by: Tokuma Shoten
- Magazine: Weekly Asahi Geinō
- Original run: December 30, 2010 – present
- Volumes: 58
- Television drama
- Original network: TV Tokyo
- Original run: April 10, 2013 – July 3, 2013
- Episodes: 12

Meshibana Deka Tachibana (めしばな刑事(デカ)タチバナ; "Food Talk Detective Tachibana") is a manga series written by Sabei Sakado and illustrated by Tori Tabii. It was adapted into a Japanese television drama series in 2013.

== Characters ==
- Tachibana (Jiro Sato)
- Muranaka (Tomomi Kasai)
- Nirasawa (Hitoshi Ozawa)
- Gotō (Mirai Suzuki)
- Konno (Yōichi Nukumizu)
- Takehara (Yoshiaki Umegaki)
