= Ponytail to Shushu =

- Type A cover, featuring Atsuko Maeda, Jurina Matsui (SKE48), Yuko Oshima, Minami Takahashi and Mayu Watanabe.

Single by AKB48

from the album Koko ni Ita Koto
- B-side: "Nusumareta Kuchibiru"; "Boku no Yell"; "Majijo Teppen Blues"
- Released: May 26, 2010
- Genre: J-pop
- Length: 4:29:00
- Label: You, Be Cool! / King
- Songwriter(s): Yasushi Akimoto, Shin'ya Tada
- Producer(s): Mashin Ikuta

AKB48 singles chronology
| "Sakura no Shiori" (2010) | "Ponytail to Shushu" (2010) | "Heavy Rotation" (2010) |

Music videos
- Ponytail to Shushu on YouTube
- Nusumareta Kuchibiru on YouTube
- Boku no YELL on YouTube
- Majijo Teppen Blues on YouTube

Alternative cover
- Type B cover, featuring Tomomi Itano, Yuki Kashiwagi, Rie Kitahara, Haruna Kojima and Mariko Shinoda.

Alternative cover
- Theatre edition cover, featuring Tomomi Itano, Tomomi Kasai, Yuki Kashiwagi, Rie Kitahara, Haruna Kojima, Atsuko Maeda, Jurina Matsui (SKE48), Minami Minegishi, Miho Miyazaki, Sae Miyazawa, Erena Ono, Yuko Oshima, Mariko Shinoda, Minami Takahashi, Aki Takajō and Mayu Watanabe.

"Ponytail to Shushu" (ポニーテールとシュシュ, Ponītēru to Shushu, "Ponytail and Scrunchie") (Note: Shushu is Japanese for scrunchie.) is the 16th single by Japanese idol group AKB48, released on May 26, 2010.

== Promotion ==
The covers and music videos of the single were shot in Guam.

The first editions of the single came with a ticket to vote for the featuring members of AKB48's 17th single, "Heavy Rotation", released in August 2010. The b-side, "Majijo Teppen Blues", is the theme song of Majisuka Gakuen 2

== Chart performance ==
The single sold 354,000 copies on its first day of release. It sold 513,000 copies on its first week of sale, making it the biggest first week for a female idol group since Morning Musume's "Ren'ai Revolution 21" in 2000, and the biggest first week sales for a female artist since Hikaru Utada's "Can You Keep a Secret?" in 2001. It also became the biggest selling AKB48 single on the week it was released, beating the group's previous single "Sakura no Shiori"'s first week sales of 318,000 copies (and its total sales of 404,000).

== Track listing ==
Type A track list
| No. | Title | Writer(s) | Arranger | Length |
|---|---|---|---|---|
| 1. | "Ponytail to Shushu" | Yasushi Akimoto, Shinya Tada | Mashin Ikuta | 4:29 |
| 2. | "Nusumareta Kuchibiru" (盗まれた唇 "Stolen Kiss" performed by Under Girls) | Akimoto, Yoshimasa Inoue | Inoue | 4:00 |
| 3. | "Boku no Yell" (僕のＹＥＬＬ "My Yell" performed by Theater Girls) | Akimoto, Takafumi Fujino | Ikuta | 5:03 |
| 4. | "Ponytail to Shushu (Off Vocal Ver.)" | Akimoto, Tada | Ikuta | 4:29 |
| 5. | "Nusumareta Kuchibiru (Off Vocal Ver.)" | Akimoto, Inoue | Inoue | 4:00 |
| 6. | "Boku no Yell (Off Vocal Ver.)" | Akimoto, Fujino | Ikuta | 5:05 |
| Total length: | | | | 27:17 |

Type B track list
| No. | Title | Writer(s) | Arranger | Length |
|---|---|---|---|---|
| 1. | "Ponytail to Shushu" | Akimoto, Tada | Ikuta | 4:29 |
| 2. | "Nusumareta Kuchibiru" (Under Girls) | Akimoto, Inoue | Inoue | 4:00 |
| 3. | "Majijo Teppen Blues" (マジジョテッペンブルース) | Akimoto, Yūichi Ichikawa | Ichikawa | 3:46 |
| 4. | "Ponytail to Shushu (Off Vocal Ver.)" | Akimoto, Tada | Ikuta | 4:29 |
| 5. | "Nusumareta Kuchibiru (Off Vocal Ver.)" | Akimoto, Inoue | Inoue | 4:00 |
| 6. | "Majijo Teppen Blues (Off Vocal Ver.)" | Akimoto, Ichikawa | Ichikawa | 3:46 |
| Total length: | | | | 24:38 |

Theatre version track list
| No. | Title | Writer(s) | Arranger | Length |
|---|---|---|---|---|
| 1. | "Ponytail to Shushu" | Akimoto, Tada | Ikuta | 4:29 |
| 2. | "Nusumareta Kuchibiru" (Under Girls) | Akimoto, Inoue | Inoue | 4:00 |
| 3. | "Boku no Yell" (Theater Girls) | Akimoto, Fujino | Ikuta | 5:03 |
| 4. | "Majijo Teppen Blues" | Akimoto, Ichikawa | Ichikawa | 3:46 |

== Personnel ==
=== Ponytail to Shushu ===
Centers: Atsuko Maeda and Minami Takahashi

- Team A: Haruna Kojima, Atsuko Maeda, Mariko Shinoda, Aki Takajō, Minami Takahashi
- Team K: Tomomi Itano, Minami Minegishi, Sae Miyazawa, Erena Ono, Yuko Oshima
- Team B: Tomomi Kasai, Yuki Kashiwagi, Rie Kitahara, Miho Miyazaki, Mayu Watanabe.
- SKE48 Team S: Jurina Matsui

=== Nusumareta Kuchibiru ===
Performed by Under Girls.

Centers: Ami Maeda and Rena Matsui

- Team A: Haruka Katayama, Asuka Kuramochi, Misaki Iwasa, Ami Maeda, Aika Ōta, Rino Sashihara
- Team K: Sayaka Akimoto, Reina Fujie, Ayaka Kikuchi, Moeno Nitō
- Team B: Mika Komori, Manami Oku, Amina Satō, Sumire Satō
- SKE48 team S: Rena Matsui, Kumi Yagami

=== Boku no Yell ===
- Team A: Natsumi Matsubara, Haruka Nakagawa, Chisato Nakata, Sayaka Nakaya, Shizuka Ōya
- Team K: Sakiko Matsui, Tomomi Nakatsuka, Misato Nonaka, Miku Tanabe, Mayumi Uchida, Ayaka Umeda, Rumi Yonezawa
- Team B: Rina Chikano, Natsumi Hirajima, Haruka Ishida, Kana Kobayashi, Yuka Masuda, Natsuki Sato, Mariya Suzuki
- Team Research Students: Sara Fujimoto, Atsuki Ishiguro, Momoko Kinumoto, Anna Mori, Mariya Nagao, Mariko Nakamura, Mina Ōba, Yuriko Sano, Haruka Shimazaki, Haruka Shimada, Eri Takamatsu, Miyu Takeuchi, Asaka Ueki, Suzuran Yamauchi, Yui Yokoyama

=== Majijo Teppen Blues ===
- Team A: Haruna Kojima, Asuka Kuramochi, Atsuko Maeda, Ami Maeda, Aika Ōta, Rino Sashihara, Mariko Shinoda, Aki Takajō, Minami Takahashi
- Team K: Sayaka Akimoto, Tomomi Itano, Sae Miyazawa, Moeno Nitō, Yūko Ōshima, Erena Ono
- Team B: Tomomi Kasai, Yuki Kashiwagi, Rie Kitahara, Komori, Miho Miyazaki, Manami Oku, Mayu Watanabe.
- SKE48 team S: Jurina Matsui, Rena Matsui
- SDN48: Nachu

== Charts ==
| Chart | Peak position |
|---|---|
| Billboard Adult Contemporary Airplay | 24 |
| Billboard Japan Hot 100 | 1 |
| Billboard yearly Japan Hot 100 | 13 |
| Oricon Daily Singles | 1 |
| Oricon Weekly Singles | 1 |
| Oricon Monthly Singles | 2 |
| Oricon Yearly singles | 5 |
| RIAJ Digital Track Chart weekly top 100 | 11 |
| RIAJ Digital Track Chart yearly top 100 | 16 |

=== Sales and certifications ===
| Chart | Amount |
|---|---|
| Oricon physical sales | 720,000 |
| RIAJ physical shipping certification | Triple platinum (750,000+) |
| RIAJ full-length cellphone/PC downloads | Million (1,000,000+) |
