= Beginner (AKB48 song) =

- Type A regular edition cover, featuring Tomomi Itano, Minami Takahashi, Atsuko Maeda, and Yuko Oshima.

Single by AKB48

from the album Koko ni Ita Koto
- B-side: "Boku Dake no Value"; "Kimi ni Tsuite"; "Nakeru Basho"
- Released: October 27, 2010
- Recorded: 2010
- Genre: J-pop; funk; electropop
- Length: 3:57
- Label: You, Be Cool! / King
- Songwriter(s): Yoshimasa Inoue, Yasushi Akimoto
- Producer(s): Yasushi Akimoto

AKB48 singles chronology
"Heavy Rotation" (2010)	"Beginner" (2010)	"Chance no Junban" (2010)

Music video
- "Beginner" on YouTube

"Beginner" is Japanese idol girl group AKB48's eighteenth single, released on October 27, 2010.

== Release Information ==
Much like AKB48's previous singles such as "Heavy Rotation", "Beginner" was released in three different versions with five cover variations, with the theater version being exclusively sold in the AKB48 theater in Akihabara, Tokyo. Each version contained a different set list aside from the title track and "Boku Dake no Value". The third track on type A, "Kimi ni Tsuite" performed by Mint, was selected via a fan vote held on Ameba Pigg. In addition, the DVDs attached to all versions except for the theater version each contains three out of the possible six different music videos made for the single: Type A contained formations led by Yuko Oshima, Mariko Shinoda, and the duo of Mayu Watanabe and Jurina Matsui (SKE48), while type B featured formations led by Atsuko Maeda, Tomomi Itano, and Minami Takahashi. The original music video, directed by Tetsuya Nakashima, was found to be too violent to be included with the actual single; and that version was later decided to be released exclusively as a digital download from the day of the single's release.

All non-theater versions of "Beginner" also contain a ballot code that can be used to vote for one's favorite AKB48/SKE48/SDN48 song from all previous singles and theater shows, and the top 100 of that list will become the set list of the four-day marathon concert, AKB48 Request Hour Best 100 2011, which was later held in Shibuya-AX from January 20 to 23, 2011. In addition, all first press limited editions of "Beginner" contain a national handshaking event ticket, and can be used during the later handshaking tour to meet AKB48 members up close and in person. The theater version, on the other hand, contains a ticket to a special handshaking event commemorating the release of the theater version, as well as one photo card of a random member of AKB48.

"Beginner" managed to have 1.03 million copies shipped to retailers before its release, and sold 568,095 copies on its first day. By the end of its first week of release, "Beginner" has sold 826,989 copies and reach top spot on the Oricon weekly singles chart. This meant that Beginner became AKB48's 5th consecutive number 1 single, and has surpassed Speed's 1998 single, "All My True Love", as the best selling girl group single in its opening week on the Oricon. The sale figures also placed "Beginner" as the third best selling single in its debut week by a female artist of all time on the Oricon, behind Hikaru Utada's "Addicted to You", and Namie Amuro's "Can You Celebrate?", which sold 1.06 million and 828,000 copies in their opening week respectively. By selling almost 1 million copies by the end of the year, "Beginner" was the best-selling single of 2010 in Japan.

== Track listing ==
All lyrics are written by Yasushi Akimoto.

Type A
No.	Title	Music	Length
1.	"Beginner"	Yoshimasa Inoue	3:57
2.	"Boku Dake no Value" (僕だけのvalue "Our Unique Value", performed by Undergirls)	Jun Koami	4:32
3.	"Kimi ni Tsuite" (君について "About You", performed by Mint)	Yukari Aono	5:39
4.	"Beginner" (Off Vocal Ver.)	Y. Inoue	3:54
5.	"Boku Dake no Value" (Off Vocal Ver.)	J. Koami	4:32
6.	"Kimi ni Tsuite" (Off Vocal Ver.)	Y. Aono	5:41

Type B
No.	Title	Music	Length
1.	"Beginner"	Yoshimasa Inoue	3:57
2.	"Boku Dake no Value"	Jun Koami	4:32
3.	"Nakeru Basho" (泣ける場所 "A Place to Cry", performed by Diva)	Kiichi Tsurusaki	5:01
4.	"Beginner" (Off Vocal Ver.)	Y. Inoue	3:54
5.	"Boku Dake no Value" (Off Vocal Ver.)	J. Koami	4:32
6.	"Nakeru Basho" (Off Vocal Ver.)	K. Tsurusaki	5:03

Theater version
No.	Title	Music	Length
1.	"Beginner"	Yoshimasa Inoue	3:57
2.	"Boku Dake no Value"	Jun Koami	4:32
3.	"Kimi ni Tsuite"	Yukari Aono	5:39
4.	"Nakeru Basho"	Kiichi Tsurusaki	5:01

== Contributing members ==
=== Beginner ===
(Bold indicates front members who appears on regular and limited covers of the single)

Center: Atsuko Maeda

- Team A: **Haruna Kojima**, Rino Sashihara, **Mariko Shinoda**, Aki Takajō, **Minami Takahashi**, **Atsuko Maeda**
- Team K: **Tomomi Itano**, **Yuko Oshima**, Minami Minegishi, Sae Miyazawa
- Team B: Tomomi Kasai, **Yuki Kashiwagi**, Rie Kitahara, **Mayu Watanabe**
- SKE48 team S: Jurina Matsui, Rena Matsui

All senbatsu members who appear in this single have appeared in the last single, Heavy Rotation. Notable omissions from the last single include Erena Ono, who has graduated from AKB48 in September and Sayaka Akimoto, captain of Team K. Other senbatsu members from Heavy Rotation who did not make it are Amina Satō, Haruka Nakagawa, and Miho Miyazaki, who placed 18th, 20th, and 21st respectively at the general election.

=== Boku Dake no Value ===
Credited as Undergirls

- Team A: Misaki Iwasa, Aika Ōta, Haruka Katayama, Haruka Nakagawa, Ami Maeda
- Team K: Ayaka Kikuchi, Moeno Nitō, Reina Fujie, Sakiko Matsui, Rumi Yonezawa
- Team B: Haruka Ishida, Manami Oku, Mika Komori, Sumire Satō, Natsumi Hirajima, Miho Miyazaki
- SKE48 team S: Yuria Kizaki, Kumi Yagami
- SKE48 team KII: Anna Ishida, Akane Takayanagi, Manatsu Mukaida

=== Kimi ni Tsuite ===
Credited as Mint

- Team A: Haruka Katayama, Atsuko Maeda
- Team K: Moeno Nitō, Sakiko Matsui
- Team B: Tomomi Kasai

=== Nakeru Basho ===
Credited as Diva

(Bold indicates front members)

- Team A: Shizuka Ōya, **Asuka Kuramochi**, Chisato Nakata, Sayaka Nakaya, Natsumi Matsubara,
- Team K: **Sayaka Akimoto**, Mayumi Uchida, Ayaka Umeda, Miku Tanabe, Tomomi Nakatsuka, Misato Nonaka
- Team B: Kana Kobayashi, Amina Satō, Natsuki Sato, Mariya Suzuki, Rina Chikano, **Yuka Masuda**
- SKE48 team S: Masana Ōya

== Charts and certifications ==
=== Charts ===
Chart	Peak position
Billboard Adult Contemporary Airplay	19
Billboard Japan Hot 100	1
Billboard yearly Japan Hot 100	11
Oricon daily singles	1
Oricon weekly singles	1
Oricon monthly singles	2
Oricon yearly singles	1
RIAJ Digital Track Chart weekly top 100	2
RIAJ Digital Track Chart yearly top 100	29

=== Sales and certifications ===
Chart	Amount
Oricon physical sales	1,010,000
RIAJ physical shipping certification	Million (1,000,000+)
RIAJ full-length cellphone/PC downloads	Million (1,000,000+)
