= Chance no Junban =

- Type A cover, featuring Sumire Sato, Haruka Nakagawa, Haruka Ishida, Mayumi Uchida, Haruna Kojima, and Ami Maeda.

Single by AKB48

from the album Koko ni Ita Koto
- B-side: "Yoyaku shita Christmas"; "Kurumi to Dialogue"; "Alive"; "Love Jump"; "Fruit Snow"
- Released: December 8, 2010
- Recorded: 2010
- Genre: J-pop
- Length: 4:19
- Label: You, Be Cool! / King
- Composer(s): Yuko Konishi
- Lyricist(s): Yasushi Akimoto
- Producer(s): Yasushi Akimoto

AKB48 singles chronology
"Beginner" (2010)	"Chance no Junban" (2010)	"Sakura no Ki ni Narō" (2011)

Music video
- "Chance no Junban" on YouTube

"Chance no Junban" (チャンスの順番, Chansu no Junban, "The Order of Chance") is Japanese idol girl group AKB48's 19th single, released on December 8, 2010.

== Member selection ==
Following AKB48's July concerts at Yoyogi National Gymnasium in Tokyo, it was announced that the headlining "senbatsu" members for the 19th single would be decided in a janken (rock paper scissors) tournament among AKB48 members and four representatives of AKB48 trainees (also known as research students or kenkyuusei) also decided by janken. The tournament was a bracketed, single knockout format with 51 members. (Note: The tournament originally consisted of 52 members, but Team K member Erena Ono had graduated.) The top 16 were given senbatsu status and participated in the single, 12 of which would be given media senbatsu members (which means that these 12 would appear on TV shows and other media promoting the single). The tournament was held at Nippon Budokan on September 21, and was won by Team K's Mayumi Uchida, who was given the center headlining position.

== Release ==
"Chance no Junban" was released in four different versions and cover variations, with the theater version being exclusively sold in the AKB48 theater in Akihabara, Tokyo. Versions A, K, and B contained a different third track aside from the title track and "Yoyaku shita Christmas", which was performed by one of the respective teams of AKB48. The theater version included a third track that was performed by Team Research Students. In addition to including their respective music videos, versions A, K, and B also included footages of the janken tournament that took place in Budokan in September. All first press releases was enclosed with a handshaking event ticket, to be redeemed later in national handshaking tours held across Japan in promotion of the single release.

== Reception ==
"Chance no Junban" only sold 471,242 copies in its first day, placing it on top of the Oricon daily chart, and sold 54,780 more on the second day. The single has been certified triple platinum by the RIAJ for physical sales.

All succeeding singles after Chance no Junban sold 1 million copies in their first week of release, starting the AKB48 Million Streak, which lasted until the 42nd single, Kuchibiru ni Be My Baby.

== Track listing ==
All lyrics are written by Yasushi Akimoto.

Type A
No.	Title	Music	Length
1.	"Chance no Junban" (チャンスの順番 Chansu no Junban, "The Order of Chance")	Yuko Konishi	4:19
2.	"Yoyakushita Christmas" (予約したクリスマス Yoyakushita Kurisumasu, "Promised Christmas")	Tsukasa Nakagawa	4:13
3.	"Kurumi to Dialogue" (胡桃とダイアローグ Kurumi to Daiarōgu, "Walnut and Dialogue", performed by Team A)	PJ	3:20
4.	"Chance no Junban" (Off Vocal Ver.)	Y. Konishi	4:19
5.	"Yoyakushita Christmas" (Off Vocal Ver.)	T. Nakagawa	4:13
6.	"Kurumi to Dialogue" (Off Vocal Ver.)	PJ	3:20

Type K
No.	Title	Music	Length
1.	"Chance no Junban"	Yuko Konishi	4:19
2.	"Yoyakushita Christmas"	Tsukasa Nakagawa	4:13
3.	"Alive" ("ALIVE", Performed by Team K)	Yō Yamazaki	3:53
4.	"Chance no Junban" (Off Vocal Ver.)	Y. Konishi	4:19
5.	"Yoyakushita Christmas" (Off Vocal Ver.)	T. Nakagawa	4:13
6.	"Alive" (Off Vocal Ver.)	Y. Yamazaki	3:53

Type B
No.	Title	Music	Length
1.	"Chance no Junban"	Yuko Konishi	4:19
2.	"Yoyakushita Christmas"	Tsukasa Nakagawa	4:13
3.	"Love Jump" (ラブ・ジャンプ Rabu Janpu, performed by Team B)	Fumiki Ikema	3:20
4.	"Chance no Junban" (Off Vocal Ver.)	Y. Konishi	4:19
5.	"Yoyakushita Christmas" (Off Vocal Ver.)	T. Nakagawa	4:13
6.	"Love Jump" (Off Vocal Ver.)	F. Ikema	3:20

Theater version
No.	Title	Music	Length
1.	"Chance no Junban"	Yuko Konishi	4:19
2.	"Yoyakushita Christmas"	Tsukasa Nakagawa	4:13
3.	"Fruit Snow" (フルーツ・スノウ, performed by Team Research Students)	Ryosuke Shigenaga	3:48
4.	"Chance no Junban" (Off Vocal Ver.)	Y. Konishi	4:19
5.	"Yoyakushita Christmas" (Off Vocal Ver.)	T. Nakagawa	4:13
6.	"Fruit Snow" (Off Vocal Ver.)	R. Shigenaga	3:48

== Contributing members ==
=== Chance no Junban ===
(Bold indicates front members who appears on the cover of theater version of the single, number in brackets denotes final placements in the Janken Tournament)

- Team A: Asuka Kuramochi (10th), **Haruna Kojima** (3rd), **Aki Takajō** (8th), **Haruka Nakagawa** (4th), Atsuko Maeda (15th), **Ami Maeda** (5th)
- Team K: **Mayumi Uchida** (1st), Miku Tanabe (12th), Tomomi Nakatsuka (9th), Sakiko Matsui (14th)
- Team B: **Haruka Ishida** (2nd), Tomomi Kasai (13th), Kana Kobayashi (11th), **Sumire Sato** (6th), **Natsuki Sato** (7th), Rina Chikano (16th)

Only 4 senbatsu members who appear in this single have appeared in the senbatsu lineup for the last single, Beginner (Haruna Kojima, Takajo, Atsuko Maeda, Kasai). Nakagawa made her return to senbatsu since last making it in Heavy Rotation. Kuramochi has not appeared in senbatsu since Iiwake Maybe, the 13th single. Kana Kobayashi and Natsuki Sato both reappeared in senbatsu after an absence of 3 years and 8 months (since the 3rd single, Keibetsu Shiteita Aijō). Finally, other members such as Uchida, Ami Maeda, Tanabe, Nakatsuka, Sakiko Matsui, Ishida, Sumire Sato, and Chikano are making their first senbatsu appearance in an AKB48 single.

=== Yoyaku shita Christmas ===
- Team A: Haruna Kojima, Rino Sashihara, Mariko Shinoda, Aki Takajo, Minami Takahashi, Atsuko Maeda, Ami Maeda
- Team K: Tomomi Itano, Yuko Oshima, Minami Minegishi, Sae Miyazawa
- Team B: Tomomi Kasai, Yuki Kashiwagi, Rie Kitahara, Mika Komori, Mayu Watanabe

=== Kurumi to Dialogue ===
Performed by Team A

(Bold indicates center member)

- Team A: Misaki Iwasa, Aika Ota, Shizuka Oya, Haruka Katayama, Kuramochi Asuka, Haruna Kojima, Rino Sashihara, Mariko Shinoda, Aki Takajo, Takahashi, Nakagawa, Chisato Nakata, Sayaka Nakaya, **Atsuko Maeda**, Ami Maeda, Natsumi Matsubara

=== Alive ===
Performed by Team K

(Bold indicates center members)

- Team K: Sayaka Akimoto, **Tomomi Itano**, Uchida, Ayaka Umeda, **Yuko Oshima**, Ayaka Kikuchi, Miku Tanabe, Tomomi Nakatsuka, Moeno Nito, Misato Nonaka, Reina Fujie, Sakiko Matsui, Minami Minegishi, Sae Miyazawa, Yui Yokoyama, Rumi Yonezawa

=== Love Jump ===
Performed by Team B

(Bold indicates center members)

- Team B: Haruka Ishida, Manami Oku, Tomomi Kasai, **Yuki Kashiwagi**, Rie Kitahara, Kana Kobayashi, Mika Komori, Amina Sato, Sumire Sato, Natsuki Sato, Mariya Suzuki, Rina Chikano, Natsumi Hirajima, Yuka Masuda, Miho Miyazaki, **Mayu Watanabe**

=== Fruit Snow ===
Performed by Kenkyusei

- Team Research Students: Miori Ichikawa, Anna Iriyama, Mina Oba, Rena Kato, Yuki Kanazawa, Haruka Shimazaki, Haruka Shimada, Shihori Suzuki, Miyu Takeuchi, Mariya Nagao, Shiori Nakamata, Mariko Nakamura, Wakana Natori, Anna Mori, Suzuran Yamauchi, Nau Yamaguchi

== Charts ==
Chart	Peak position
Oricon Daily singles	1
Oricon weekly singles	1
Oricon monthly singles	3
Oricon yearly singles	8
RIAJ Digital Track Chart weekly top 100	12
