= Sakura no Ki ni Narō =

Single by AKB48

from the album 1830m
- B-side: "Gūzen no Jūjiro"; "Kiss Made 100 Mile"; "Area K"; "Ōgon no Center"
- Released: February 16, 2011
- Recorded: 2011
- Genre: J-pop; ballad
- Length: 5:30
- Label: You, Be Cool! / King
- Songwriter: Yasushi Akimoto
- Producer: Akimoto

AKB48 singles chronology
"Chance no Junban" (2010)	"Sakura no Ki ni Narō" (2011)	"Everyday, Katyusha" (2011)

Music video
- "Sakura no Ki ni Narō" on YouTube

"Sakura no Ki ni Narō" (桜の木になろう, "Let's Become Cherry Blossom Trees") is a 20th single by Japanese idol girl group AKB48, released on February 16, 2011.

Main song from this single was redone in Thai as B-track by BNK48 and released in 2022.

== Release information ==
It is the 20th major-label single (22nd overall) released by AKB48. It was released in five versions: a limited type-A CD+DVD edition, a regular type-A CD+DVD edition, a limited type-B CD+DVD edition, a regular type-B CD+DVD edition, and a limited CD-only theater edition. The limited type-A and type-B editions came with a national handshaking event ticket, while the theater edition came with a "Sakura no Ki ni Narō" handshaking event ticket and one member picture at random. The title track was used as the theme song for the drama Sakura Kara no Tegami: AKB48 Sorezore no Sotsugyō Monogatari, which starred all AKB48 members. The single sold 655,344 copies on its first day of release, which is at the time, the most that any artist has sold in a single day since Oricon started reporting daily sales in March 2009.

When the music video published in YouTube, official discretion states that "The most heart-warming song in all of AKB48 history is born."

== Track listing ==
=== Type-A CD track list ===
1. Sakura no Ki ni Narō (桜の木になろう)
2. Gūzen no Jūjiro (偶然の十字路) (Undergirls)
3. Kiss Made 100 Mile (キスまで100マイル) (MINT)
4. Sakura no Ki ni Narō off vocal ver.
5. Gūzen no Jūjiro off vocal ver.
6. Kiss Made 100 Mile off vocal ver.

=== Type-A DVD track list ===
1. Sakura no Ki ni Narō Music Clip
2. Gūzen no Jūjiro Music Clip
3. Kiss Made 100 Mile Music Clip
4. Members' Personal Clothes Fashion Show (Type-A) (ガチ私服ファッションショー（Type-A）)

=== Type-B CD track list ===
1. Sakura no Ki ni Narō (桜の木になろう)
2. Gūzen no Jūjiro (偶然の十字路) (Undergirls)
3. Area K (エリアK) (DIVA)
4. Sakura no Ki ni Narō off vocal ver.
5. Gūzen no Jūjiro off vocal ver.
6. Area K off vocal ver.

=== Type-B DVD track list ===
1. Sakura no Ki ni Narō Music Clip <Complete Version> (桜の木になろう Music Clip＜完全版＞)
2. Gūzen no Jūjiro Music Clip
3. Area K Music Clip
4. Members' Personal Clothes Fashion Show (Type-B) (ガチ私服ファッションショー（Type-B）)

=== Theatre CD track list ===
1. Sakura no Ki ni Narō (桜の木になろう)
2. Gūzen no Jūjiro (偶然の十字路) (Undergirls)
3. Ōgon Center (黄金センター) (team Kenkyuusei)
4. Sakura no Ki ni Narō off vocal ver.
5. Gūzen no Jūjiro off vocal ver.
6. Ōgon Center off vocal ver.

== Contributing members ==
=== "Sakura no Ki ni Narō" ===
Center: Atsuko Maeda

- Team A: Haruna Kojima, Rino Sashihara, Mariko Shinoda, Aki Takajō, Minami Takahashi, Atsuko Maeda
- Team K: Tomomi Itano, Yuko Oshima, Minami Minegishi, Sae Miyazawa
- Team B: Tomomi Kasai, Yuki Kashiwagi, Rie Kitahara, Mayu Watanabe
- Team S (SKE48): Jurina Matsui, Rena Matsui

=== "Gūzen no Jūjiro" ===
Credited as "Undergirls"

Center: Yui Yokoyama, Kanon Kimoto.

- Team A: Aika Ota, Haruka Nakagawa, Ami Maeda
- Team K: Mayumi Uchida, Ayaka Kikuchi, Moeno Nito, Reina Fujie, Yui Yokoyama
- Team B: Haruka Ishida, Manami Oku (last single), Mika Komori, Sumire Sato, Miho Miyazaki
- Team S (SKE48): Masana Oya, Kumi Yagami
- Team KII (SKE48): Akane Takayanagi, Manatsu Mukaida
- Team E (SKE48): Kanon Kimoto

=== "Kiss Made 100 Mile" ===
Credited as "Mint"

- Team A: Haruka Katayama, Atsuko Maeda
- Team K: Moeno Nito, Sakiko Matsui
- Team B: Tomomi Kasai

=== "Area K" ===
Credited as "Diva"

- Team A: Misaki Iwasa, Shizuka Ōya, Asuka Kuramochi, Chisato Nakata, Sayaka Nakaya, Natsumi Matsubara
- Team K: Sayaka Akimoto, Ayaka Umeda, Miku Tanabe, Tomomi Nakatsuka, Misato Nonaka, Rumi Yonezawa
- Team B: Kana Kobayashi, Amina Sato, Natsuki Sato, Mariya Suzuki, Rina Chikano, Natsumi Hirajima, Yuka Masuda

=== "Ōgon Center" ===
Credited as "Team Kenkyūsei"

- 9th Generation: Mina Oba, Haruka Shimazaki, Haruka Shimada, Miyu Takeuchi, Mariya Nagao, Mariko Nakamura, Anna Mori, Suzuran Yamauchi
- 10th Generation: Maria Abe, Rina Izuta, Miori Ichikawa, Anna Iriyama, Rena Kato, Yuki Kanazawa, Marina Kobayashi, Shiori Nakamata, Nana Fujita
- 11th Generation: Sara Ushikuba, Rina Kawaei, Natsuki Kojima, Shihori Suzuki, Wakana Natori, Ayaka Morikawa, Nau Yamaguchi

== Oricon Charts (Japan) ==
Release	Oricon Singles Chart	Peak position	Debut sales (copies)	Sales total (copies)
16 February 2011	Daily Chart	1	655,344	
16 February 2011	Weekly Chart	1	942,479	1,079,460
16 February 2011	Monthly Chart	1	997,963	
