= Kaze wa Fuite Iru =

2011 single by AKB48

Single by AKB48

from the album 1830m
- B-side: "Kimi no Senaka"; "Vamos" (Type A); "Gondola Lift" (Type B); "Tsubomitachi" (Theater Edition)
- Released: October 26, 2011 (Japan)
- Recorded: 2011
- Genre: J-pop; folk rock
- Label: You, Be Cool! / King
- Songwriter(s): Yasushi Akimoto (lyrics)
- Producer(s): Yasushi Akimoto

AKB48 singles chronology
"Flying Get" (2011)	"Kaze wa Fuite Iru" (2011)	"Ue kara Mariko" (2011)

Music videos
- Kaze wa Fuite Iru (Dance! Dance! Dance! Ver.) on YouTube
- Kimi no Senaka (preview) on YouTube

"Kaze wa Fuite Iru" or "Kaze wa Fuiteiru" (風は吹いている; "The Wind Is Blowing"), is the 23rd single by the Japanese girl idol group AKB48, released on October 26, 2011.

== Release history and information ==
The title of the upcoming October single by AKB48 was first announced to 20,000 fans present at the handshake event held to celebrate the launch of the group's 22nd single, "Flying Get", at the Nagoya Dome on September 4.

The single was released in 5 versions: Type A Regular and Limited editions, Type B Regular and Limited editions, and a Theater Edition.

It was written with lyric meant to ease the pain of the tsunami victims from the 2011 Tōhoku earthquake and tsunami, as well as part of the large relief process to help out with restoration as the group has donated over 1.25 billion yen, and continue to hold monthly trip visit to tsunami areas to perform free concerts for the children and elderly in those areas.

== Track listing ==
=== Type A ===
CD
No.	Title	Artist(s)	Length
1.	"Kaze wa Fuite Iru" (風は吹いている)
2.	"Kimi no Senaka" (君の背中)	Under Girls (アンダーガールズ)
3.	"Vamos" (Vamos)	Under Girls Baragumi (アンダーガールズ ばら組)
4.	"Kaze wa Fuite Iru off vocal ver." (風は吹いている off vocal ver.)
5.	"Kimi no Senaka off vocal ver." (君の背中 off vocal ver.)
6.	"Vamos off vocal ver." (Vamos off vocal ver.)

DVD
No.	Title	Length
1.	"Kaze wa Fuite Iru Music Video" (風は吹いている Music Video)
2.	"Kimi no Senaka Music Video" (君の背中 Music Video)
3.	"Vamos Music Video" (Vamos Music Video)
4.	"Kaze wa Fuite Iru Music Video (DANCE! DANCE! DANCE! ver.)" (風は吹いている Music Video（DANCE! DANCE! DANCE! ver.）)
5.	"Tokuten eizō AKB48 conte 'Feromon Keiji'-hen" (特典映像 AKB48コント 「フェロモン刑事」編)

=== Type B ===
CD
No.	Title	Artist(s)	Length
1.	"Kaze wa Fuite Iru" (風は吹いている)
2.	"Kimi no Senaka" (君の背中)	Under Girls (アンダーガールズ)
3.	"Gondola Lift" (ゴンドラリフト)	Under Girls Yurigumi (アンダーガールズ ゆり組)
4.	"Kaze wa Fuite Iru off vocal ver." (風は吹いている off vocal ver.)
5.	"Kimi no Senaka off vocal ver." (君の背中 off vocal ver.)
6.	"Gondola Lift off vocal ver." (ゴンドラリフト off vocal ver.)

DVD
No.	Title	Length
1.	"Kaze wa Fuite Iru Music Video" (風は吹いている Music Video)
2.	"Kimi no Senaka Music Video" (君の背中 Music Video)
3.	"Gondola Lift Music Video" (ゴンドラリフト Music Video)
4.	"Kaze wa Fuite Iru music video (DANCE! DANCE! DANCE! ver.)" (風は吹いている Music Video（DANCE! DANCE! DANCE! ver.）)
5.	"Tokuten eizō AKB 48 conte `Taxi'-hen" (特典映像 AKB48コント「タクシー」編)

=== Theater Edition ===
CD
No.	Title	Artist(s)	Length
1.	"Kaze wa Fuite Iru" (風は吹いている)
2.	"Kimi no Senaka" (君の背中)	Under Girls (アンダーガールズ)
3.	"Tsubomitachi" (蕾たち)	Team 4+Kenkyusei (Team 4＋研究生)
4.	"Kaze wa Fuite Iru off vocal ver." (風は吹いている off vocal ver.)
5.	"Kimi no Senaka off vocal ver." (君の背中 off vocal ver.)
6.	"Tsubomitachi off vocal ver." (蕾たち off vocal ver.)

== Members ==
=== "Kaze wa Fuite Iru" ===
Centers: Atsuko Maeda and Yuko Oshima

- Team A: Haruna Kojima, Rino Sashihara, Mariko Shinoda, Aki Takajō, Minami Takahashi, Atsuko Maeda
- Team K: Tomomi Itano, Yūko Ōshima, Minami Minegishi, Sae Miyazawa, Yui Yokoyama
- Team B: Tomomi Kasai, Yuki Kashiwagi, Rie Kitahara, Mayu Watanabe
- SKE48 Team S: Jurina Matsui, Rena Matsui
- NMB48 Team N: Sayaka Yamamoto

=== "Kimi no Senaka" ===
Under Girls

Center: Aika Ōta

- Team A: Misaki Iwasa, Aika Ōta, Haruka Nakagawa, Ami Maeda
- Team K: Ayaka Kikuchi, Reina Fujie
- Team B: Haruka Ishida, Mika Komori, Sumire Satō, Miho Miyazaki
- Team 4: Maria Abe, Miori Ichikawa, Anna Iriyama, Haruka Shimazaki, Suzuran Yamauchi
- Kenkyūsei: Rena Katō
- SKE48 Team KII: Akane Takayanagi
- SKE48 Team E: Kanon Kimoto
- NMB48 Kenkyūsei: Eriko Jō

=== "Vamos" ===
Under Girls Baragumi

- Team A: Shizuka Ōya, Chisato Nakata, Sayaka Nakaya, Natsumi Matsubara
- Team K: Mayumi Uchida, Miku Tanabe, Tomomi Nakatsuka, Misato Nonaka, Rumi Yonezawa
- Team B: Kana Kobayashi, Shihori Suzuki, Mariya Suzuki, Rina Chikano, Natsumi Hirajima
- Team 4: Haruka Shimada, Miyu Takeuchi, Shiori Nakamata, Mariya Nagao

=== "Gondola Lift" ===
Under Girls Yurigumi

Center: Ayaka Umeda

- Team A: Haruka Katayama, Asuka Kuramochi
- Team K: Sayaka Akimoto, Ayaka Umeda, Moeno Nitō, Sakiko Matsui
- Team B: Amina Satō, Natsuki Satō, Yuka Masuda
- Team 4: Mariko Nakamura

=== "Tsubomitachi" ===
Team4+Kenkyūsei

- Team 4: Maria Abe, Miori Ichikawa, Anna Iriyama, Haruka Shimazaki, Haruka Shimada, Miyu Takeuchi, Shiori Nakamata, Mariko Nakamura, Mariya Nagao, Suzuran Yamauchi
- Kenkyūsei: Rina Izuta, Karen Iwata, Miyu Ōmori, Rena Katō, Rina Kawaei, Natsuki Kojima, Marina Kobayashi, Erena Saeed Yokota, Yukari Sasaki, Rika Suzuki, Juri Takahashi, Yūka Tano, Wakana Natori, Rina Hirata, Nana Fujita, Tomu Muto, Ayaka Morikawa

== Chart performance ==
=== Oricon Charts ===
Release	Oricon Singles Chart	Peak position	Debut sales (copies)	Sales total (copies)
October 26, 2011	Daily Chart	1	1,045,937	1,457,113
October 26, 2011	Weekly Chart	1	1,300,482	1,457,113
October 26, 2011	Monthly Chart	1	1,300,482	1,457,113

=== Billboard Japan ===
Chart	Position
Hot100	1
Hot Top Airplay	1

=== RIAJ Digital Track Chart ===
Date	Position
October 25, 2011	1
November 1, 2011	1

=== Other major charts outside Japan ===
Region	Chart	Peak position
Taiwan	G-music Combo Chart	15
Spain	Los 40 Principales España (Spanish Top 40)	Unknown (November 12, 2011)

== JKT48 version ==
A version of the song was released by the Indonesian idol group JKT48 as their 8th single. It was released on 24 December 2014.
