= Sakiko Matsui =

Japanese singer and pianist (born 1990)

Sakiko Matsui 松井 咲子
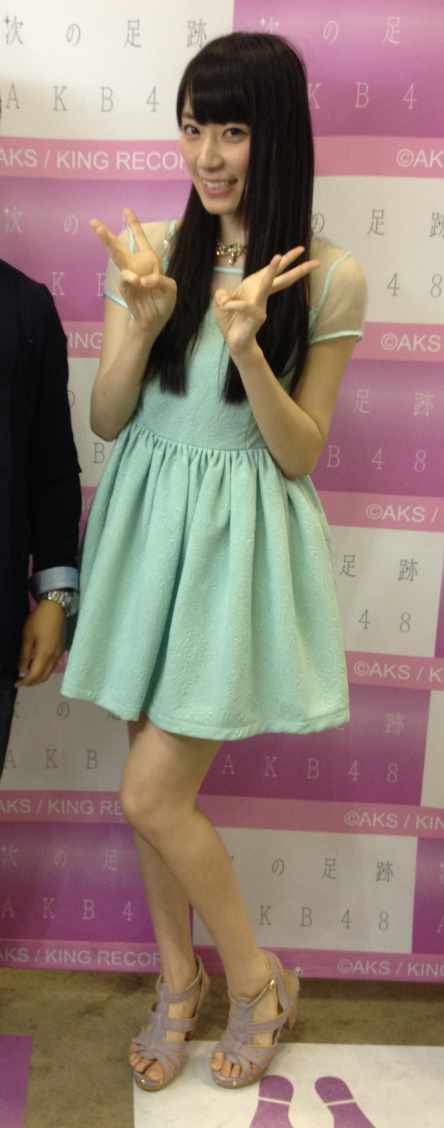
- Matsui in May 2014

Background information
- Born: December 10, 1990 (age 35)
- Origin: Warabi, Saitama Prefecture, Japan
- Genres: J-pop; pop; classical
- Occupations: Japanese idol; pianist; actress
- Instruments: Vocals; Piano
- Years active: 2009–present
- Labels: King (AKB48); Pony Canyon (Solo)
- Spouse: Kohei Ueda (m. 2023)

Sakiko Matsui (松井咲子, Matsui Sakiko; born December 10, 1990 in Warabi, Saitama Prefecture) is a Japanese singer and pianist. She was a member of AKB48. Concurrently as a student specializing in piano at Tokyo College of Music, she has released a piano instrumental album Kokyū Suru Piano on October 3, 2012, which reached number 10 on Oricon's albums chart.

== Discography ==
=== AKB48 ===
Year	No.	Title	Role	Notes and additional tracks performed
2009
2009	14	"River"	B-side	"Hikōkigumo"
2010	16	"Ponytail to Shushu"	B-side	"Boku no Yell"
2010	18	"Beginner"	B-sides	"Boku Dake no Value" and "Kimi ni Tsuite"
2010	19	"Chance no Junban"	A-side	
2011	20	"Sakura no Ki ni Narō"	B-sides	"Kiss Made 100 Mile"
2011	21	"Everyday, Katyusha"	B-side	"Hito no Chikara" (as Under Girls)
2011	22	"Flying Get"	Under Girls	"Dakishimecha Ikenai"
2011	23	"Kaze wa Fuiteiru"	Under Girls Yurigumi	"Gondola Lift"
2011	24	"Ue kara Mariko"	B-side	"Zero-sum Taiyō"
2012	25	"Give Me Five!"	Special Girls B	"Hitsujikai no Tabi"
2012	26	"Manatsu no Sounds Good!"	B-side	"Gugutasu no Sora"
2012	27	"Gingham Check"	Future Girls	"Show Fight!"
2012	28	"Uza"	B-side	"Kodoku na Hoshizora"
2012	29	"Eien Pressure"	B-side	"Watashitachi no Reason"
2013	30	"So Long!"	B-side	"Ruby" (as Team A)
2013	31	"Sayonara Crawl"	Team A	"Ikiru Koto"
2013	32	"Koisuru Fortune Cookie"	Future Girls	"Suitei Marmalade"
2013	33	"Heart Electric"	Team A	"Kisu made Countdown"
2014	35	"Mae shika Mukanee"	Team A	"Koi to ka"
2014	36	"Labrador Retriever (song)"	B-side	"Kimi wa Kimagure" (as Team A)
2014	38	"Kibouteki Refrain"	B-sides	"Juujun na Slave" (as Team A) & "Reborn" (as Team Surprise)

=== Solo albums ===
- ja:Kokyū Suru Piano (2012) - Reached number 10 on Oricon. Sales: 10,263

== Filmography ==
- Bingo (2012)

== Personal life ==
On December 5, 2023, Matsui and comedian Kohei Ueda jointly announced through their respective social media accounts that they had registered their marriage on December 3.
