= Miho Miyazaki =

Japanese singer

Miho Miyazaki 宮崎 美穂
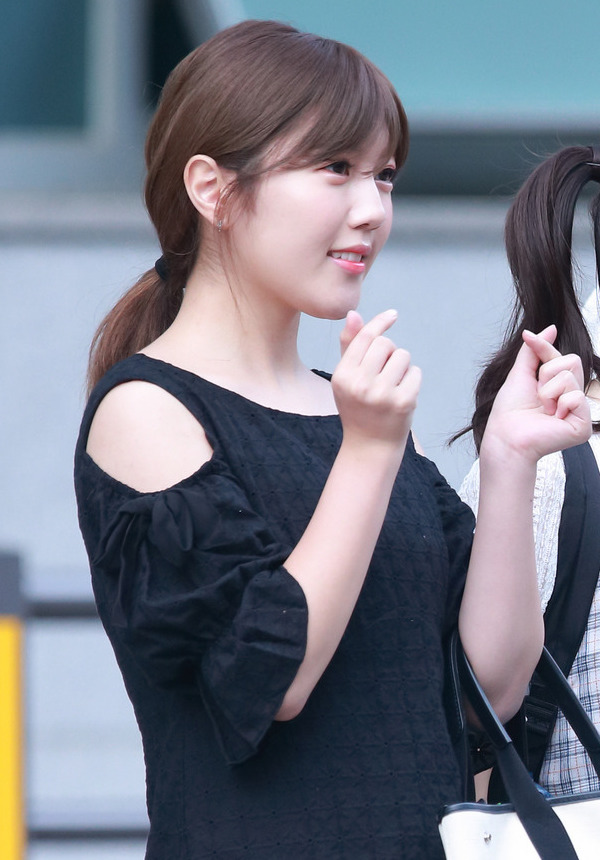
- Miho in Produce 48

Background information
- Also known as: Myao
- Born: July 30, 1993 (age 33)
- Origin: Tokyo, Japan
- Genres: Pop (J-pop, K-pop)
- Occupations: Singer, actress, idol
- Years active: 2007–present

Miho Miyazaki (宮崎 美穂, Miyazaki Miho; born July 30, 1993) is a Japanese singer, actress and former member of the idol girl group AKB48 where she was active in Team A. She also participated in the Korean-Japanese show Produce 48.

== Biography ==
In 2007, Miyazaki passed an audition for AKB48 and became a kenkyūsei (trainee) for the group's 5th generation. On July 13, 2008, she was promoted to Team A along with four other girls. On October 22, 2008, when AKB48 released the 10th single "Ōgoe Diamond", Miyazaki was listed among the performers on the A-side track for the first time.

In February 2009, Miyazaki changed her talent agency to Horipro. She also became a member of the agency's futsal team, Xanadu loves NHC. In the AKB48 general election for that year, she ranked 18th and was put on the A-side team for the group's 13th single. On July 10, 2009, for an event dedicated to the Nattō Day, Miyazaki with Tomomi Itano and Tomomi Kasai formed a subunit called Nattō Angel. At the event, they sang the self-titled track.

On January 22, 2010, in the TV series Majisuka Gakuen, Miyazaki debuted as an actress. On May 21, Miho Miyazaki was transferred from Team A to Team B. The transfer was announced on August 23 of the previous year. In the AKB48's 17th single selection Miyazaki placed 21st with 6,231 votes. This result was enough to pass the selection for the title track, but left her out of the media senbatsu*, that she was part of for the previous, 16th, single "Ponytail to Shushu". In July, she again participated in the Nattō Day celebration. That time, her group was called Nattō Angel Z, and the other girls in the unit were Sumire Satō and Haruka Ishida, both from Team B. On November 20, Miyazaki performed in AKB48's concert at the J-pop Culture Festival in Moscow, Russia.

On May 14, 2011, Miyazaki joined AKB48 members Misaki Iwasa and Mika Komori to launch the first AKB48 concept store in Singapore. The event gathered hundreds of fans. In the general election, Miyazaki placed 27th.

In the 2012 general election, held on June 6 at Nippon Budokan, Miho Miyazaki placed 38th. Miyazaki was transferred from Team B to Team K as part of the teams' reshuffle announced during the Tokyo Dome concert on August 24, 2012.

On April 6, 2016, Miyazaki acted on the radio "ON8+1" as a radio host for the first time and has worked on this radio show every Wednesday.

In 2018, she participated in the South Korean television competition Produce 48 where she was eliminated in the final episode in 15th place.

On December 12, 2021, Miyazaki announced her graduation from AKB48. She officially graduated from the group on April 15, 2022.

She plans to start a career in South Korea after graduation.

== Discography ==
=== Singles with AKB48 ===
Year	No.	Title	Role	Notes
2008	10	"Ōgoe Diamond"	A-side	Also sang "109 (Marukyū)"
2009	11	"10nen Sakura"	A-side	
2009	12	"Namida Surprise!"	A-side	
2009	13	"Iiwake Maybe"	A-side	Ranked 18th in 2009 General Election
2009	14	"River"	A-side	
2010	15	"Sakura no Shiori"	A-side	Also sang on "Enkyori Poster".
2010	16	"Ponytail to Shushu"	A-side	Also sang on "Majijo Teppen Blues"
2010	17	"Heavy Rotation"	A-side	Ranked 21st in 2010 General Election. Also sang on "Yasai Sisters" and "Lucky Seven".
2010	18	"Beginner"	Under Girls	Sang "Boku Dake no Value"
2010	19	"Chance no Junban"	B-side	Sang "Love Jump"
2011	20	"Sakura no Ki ni Narō"	Under Girls	Sang "Gūzen no Jūjiro"
2011	21	"Everyday, Katyusha"	A-side	Also sang "Yankee Soul".
2011	22	"Flying Get"	B-side	Ranked 27th in 2011 General Election. Sang "Dakishimecha Ikenai", "Seishun to Kizukanai Mama", "Yasai Uranai".
2011	23	"Kaze wa Fuiteiru"	B-side	Sang "Kimi no Senaka"
2011	24	"Ue kara Mariko"	B-side	Sang "Yobisute Fantasy"
2012	25	"Give Me Five!"	B-side	Sang "Yungu ya Furoito no Baai" as Special Girls C.
2012	26	"Manatsu no Sounds Good!"	B-side	Sang "Mitsu no Namida".
2012	27	"Gingham Check"	Next Girls	Ranked 38th in 2012 General Election. Sang on "Doremifa Onchi".
2012	28	"Uza"	B-side	Sang "Scrap & Build" as New Team k.
2012	29	"Eien Pressure"	B-side	Sang on "Watashitachi no Reason".
2013	30	"So Long!"	B-side	Sang "Yūhi Marie" as Team K.
2013	31	"Sayonara Crawl"	B-side	Sang "How Come?" as Team K.
2013	33	"Heart Electric"	B-side	Sang "Sasameyuki Regret" as Team K.
2014	35	"Mae Shika Mukanee"	B-side	Sang "Koi to ka...".
2014	36	"Labrador Retriever"	B-side	Sang "Itoshiki Rival" as Team K.
2014	37	Kokoro no Placard	Upcoming Girls	Ranked 78th in 2014 General Election. Sang "Chewing Gum no Aji ga Naku Naru Made"
2014	38	"Kibouteki Refrain"	B-side	Sang "Utaitai" as Katareagumi (Cattleya Group), "Hajimete no Drive" as Team K
2015	42	"Kuchibiru ni Be My Baby"	B-side	Sang on "Yasashī Place" and "M.T. ni Sasagu" as Team A.
2016	44	"Tsubasa wa Iranai"	A-side	Also sang "Set me free" as Team A.
2018	54	"No Way Man"	A-side	
2021	58	"Nemohamo Rumor"	B-side	Sang on "Black Jaguar".

== AKB48 stage units ==
AKB48 Himawarigumi 2nd Stage "Yume o Shinaseru Wake ni Ikanai"

- "Bye Bye Bye"
  Hitomi Komatani's and Minami Takahashi's stand-by

Team A 4th Stage "Tadaima Ren'aichū"

- "Junai no Creshendo" (純愛のクレッシェンド)
  Minami Takahashi's stand-by

AKB48 Team A 5th Stage "Ren'ai Kinshi Jōrei"

- "Ren'ai Kinshi Jōrei" (恋愛禁止条例)
  Minami Takahashi, Minami Minegishi, Miho Miyazaki

THEATER G-ROSSO "Yume wo Shinaseru Wake ni Ikanai"

- "Tonari no Banana" (となりのバナナ)
  Erena Ono, Miho Miyazaki, Aika Ōta

AKB48 Team B 5th Stage "Theater no Megami"

- "Arashi no Yoru ni wa" (嵐の夜には)

== Filmography ==
=== TV series ===
- Majisuka Gakuen (マジすか学園) (January 22 - February 5, March 26, 2010, TV Tokyo), as Myao
- Tōfu Shimai (豆腐姉妹) (July 31, 2010 - August 27, 2010, WOWOW)
- Majisuka Gakuen 2 (マジすか学園2) (May 6 - July 1, 2011, TV Tokyo), Myao
- AKB Horror Night: Adrenline's Night (AKBホラーナイト アドレナリンの夜) Ep.30 - Class Reunion (January 21, 2016, TV Asahi), Minori Shinozaki
- AKB Love Night: Love Factory (AKBラブナイト 恋工場) Ep. 18 - Marriage Meeting (June 15, 2016, TV Asahi), Miki
