= Manami Oku =

Japanese singer (born 1995)

Manami Oku 奥 真奈美
- Born: 22 November 1995 (age 30)
- Origin: Tokyo, Japan
- Occupation: Singer
- Years active: 2006–2011, 2018–present
- Labels: King Records, Flave Entertainment
- Formerly of: AKB48

Manami Oku (奥 真奈美, Oku Manami; born November 22, 1995 in Tokyo) is a Japanese singer. She is a former member of the Japanese girl band AKB48. She debuted in AKB48 in February 2006 as a member of the "Team K".

She graduated from AKB48 in April, 2011 when she was 15 years old, and left the entertainment industry to focus on her studies. On March 5, 2018, it was announced Oku's belonging to the talent company Flave Entertainment.

As of January 31, 2020, she no longer belongs to Flave Entertainment as the announcement has been exclusive on her social network.

== Early life ==
Oku was born on November 22, 1995, in Tokyo, Japan. Her mother is Japanese and her father is Italian.

== Career ==
In 2006, she auditioned for AKB48 and was cast to Team K. She was also a member of AKB48's subgroup Honegumi (the group was formed for a kids' TV show in 2007). She was transferred to Team B on August 23, 2009. Oku released a solo single named "Katatsumuri" in 2011. The song was used as the end theme to a NHK Educational TV's anime called Ojarumaru.

She played minor roles in the AKB48 dramas Majisuka Gakuen (2010) and Sakura Kara no Tegami (2011). Oku graduated from AKB48 in April 2011.

== Discography ==
=== Solo singles ===
Title	Release date	Chart positions			Sales (Oricon)	
Title	Release date	Oricon Weekly Singles Chart	Billboard Japan Hot 100	RIAJ Digital Track Chart^{*}	First week	Total
"Katatsumuri"	January 26, 2011	2	4	2	145,871	188,781
