= Aki Takajō =

Japanese singer and actress

- 高城 亜樹
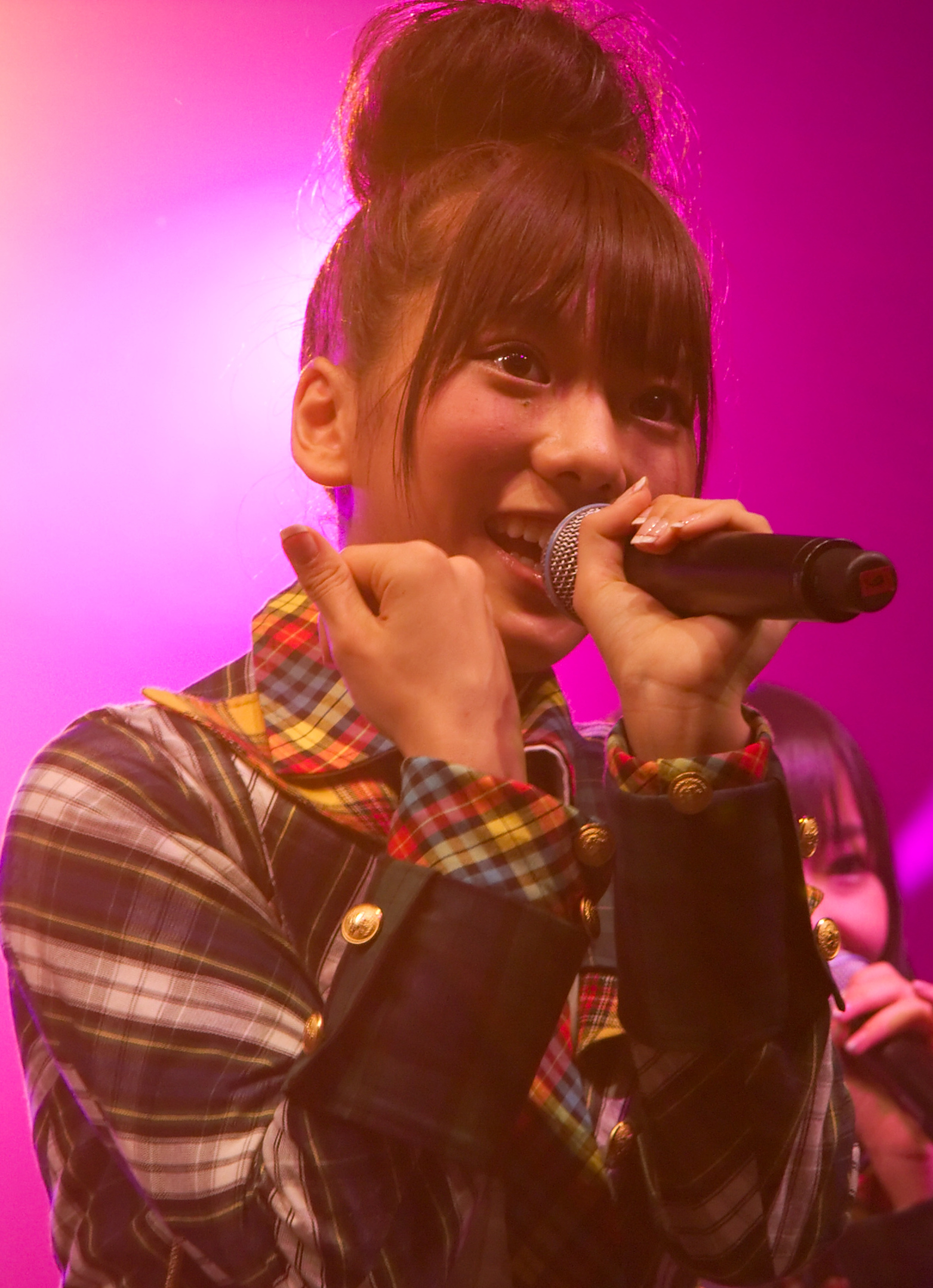
- Aki Takajō at Japan Expo 2009, Paris
- Born: October 3, 1991 (age 35); Kitakyushu, Fukuoka, Japan
- Occupations: Actress; singer
- Years active: 2008–present
- Spouse: Yuji Takahashi (m. 2019)
- Children: 2
- Relatives: Jui Takajō (sister); Yu Takahashi (sister-in-law); Maryjun Takahashi (sister-in-law); Hirotaka Urabe (brother-in-law); Koya Urabe (brother-in-law)
- Musical career
- Genre: J-pop
- Instrument: Vocals
- Years active: 2008–2016
- Formerly of: AKB48; French Kiss; JKT48

YouTube information
- Channel: Aki-cha no Mama Channel
- Years active: 2020–present
- Genre: Vlog
- Subscribers: 10,100
- Views: 782,113
- Last updated: 2021-05-07

Aki Takajō (高城 亜樹, Takajō Aki; born October 3, 1991), is a Japanese tarento who is a former member of the idol groups AKB48 and JKT48. She auditioned for AKB48's sixth generation and was promoted to member of Team A. Her talent agency is Horipro (she was previously affiliated with Watanabe Entertainment and Is.Field) and was one of the charter members to support JKT48. She is also a former member of the sub-unit French Kiss.

== Career ==
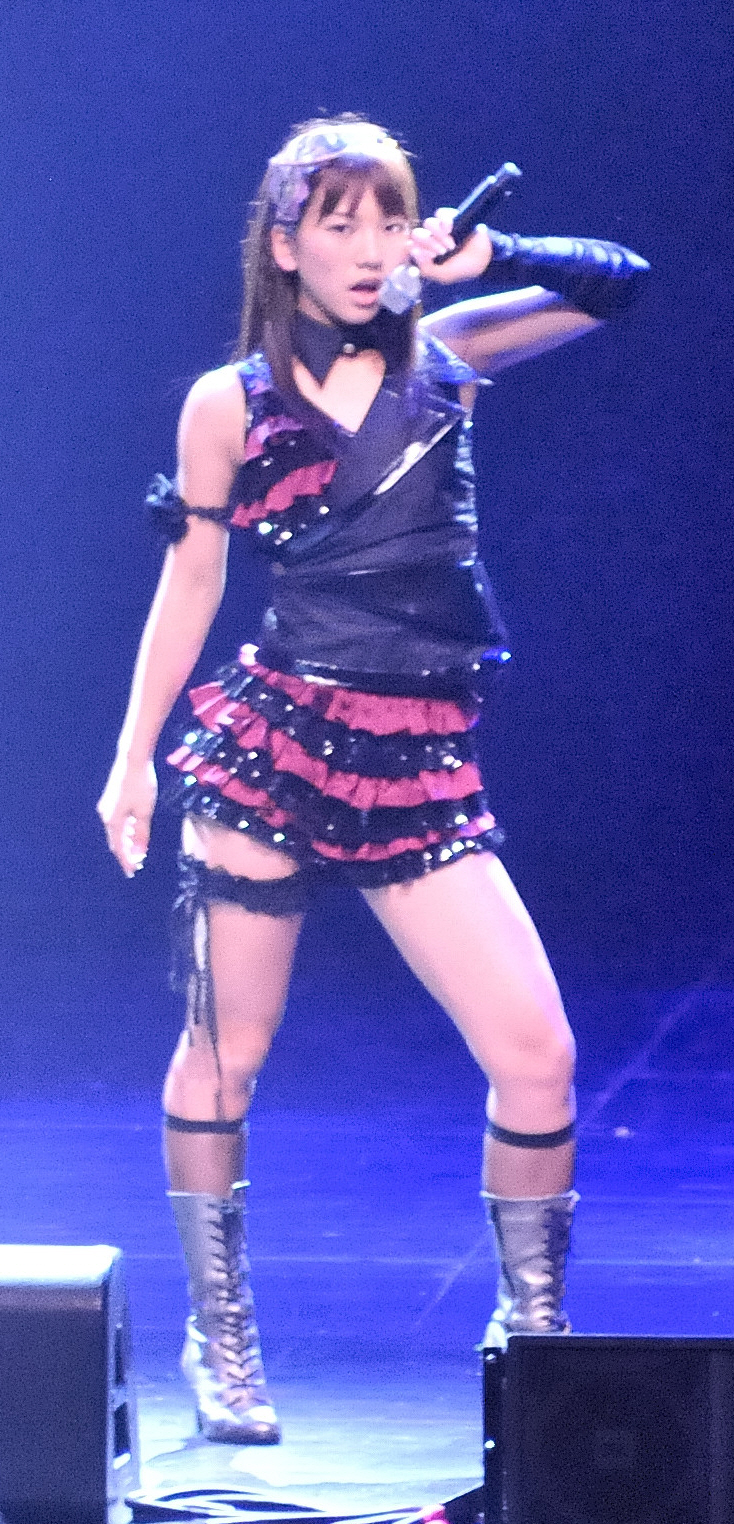
Takajō at J!-ENT Live, Los Angeles, in 2011

Takajō auditioned for AKB48 and was chosen in the group's sixth generation, also known as the third generation of Kenkyusei (trainees). She debuted on August 23, 2008, in the concert "Live DVD wa Derudarou kedo, Yappari Nama ni Kagiruze". On October 19, she substituted for Haruna Kojima on the Team A Fifth Stage, "Renai Kinshi Jorei". On December 29, Takajō was promoted to AKB48's Team A; she only spent 71 days from theater debut to full member, and it was the fastest promotion in AKB48 history at the time, until Rion Azuma from SKE48 was promoted in 2013.

Takajō's first A-side with AKB48 was in 2010 for the single "Ponytail to Shushu". In the 2010 AKB48 general elections, she placed 13th and landed a spot on the title track for "Heavy Rotation". She and AKB48 members Yuki Kashiwagi and Asuka Kuramochi formed a sub-unit, "French Kiss" and the group released the single "Zutto Mae Kara" which peaked at number five on the Oricon charts.

On August 24, 2012, the first day of its Tokyo Dome concert series, AKB48 announced a reorganization of its teams. Takajō and Haruka Nakagawa were sent to Jakarta to help AKB48's sister group JKT48. On April 28, 2013, it was announced that she would hold a concurrent position in AKB48 Team B. On February 24, 2014, during the Grand Reformation Festival, it was announced that she was released from her concurrent positions in JKT48. In 2015, she was transferred to AKB48 Team K. On December 15, 2015, at the group's AKB48 Kōhaku Uta Gassen event, she announced that she would be leaving the group. On February 23, 2016, AKB48 gave her a graduation ceremony. She officially graduated from AKB48 on May 1, 2016. She left Watanabe Productions and became a freelancer the next day, May 2.

On November 20, 2017, she announced her affiliation with the film production company and talent agency Is.Field.

On October 3, 2025, Takajo announced that she is now affiliated with Horipro.

== Personal life ==
On February 28, 2019, Takajō announced her marriage to Filipino-Japanese footballer Yuji Takahashi. She gave birth to a baby boy on November 7, 2019. She gave birth to a second baby boy on September 2, 2022.

== Discography ==
=== Singles with AKB48 ===
Year	No.	Title	Role	Notes
2009	13	"Iiwake Maybe"	Under Girls	Ranked 23rd in 2009 general election. Did not sing on title track. Sang on "Tobenai Agehacho". Debut single with Team A.
2009	14	"River"	Under Girls	Did not sing on title track. Sang on "Kimi no Koto ga Suki Dakara".
2010	15	"Sakura no Shiori"	Team PB	Did not sing on title track. Sang on "Enkyori Poster" as Team PB.
2010	16	"Ponytail to Shushu"	A-side	First A-side. Also sang on "Majijo Teppen Blues"
2010	17	"Heavy Rotation"	A-side	Ranked 13th in 2010 General Election. Also sang on "Yasai Sisters" and "Lucky Seven".
2010	18	"Beginner"	A-side	
2010	19	"Chance no Junban"	A-side	Placed 8th in rock-paper-scissors tournament. Also sang on "Yoyakushita Christmas"; and "Kurumi to Dialogue" as Team A.
2011	20	"Sakura no Ki ni Narō"	A-side	
2011	–	"Dareka no Tame ni – What can I do for someone?"	??	charity single
2011	21	"Everyday, Katyusha"	A-side	Also sang on "Korekara Wonderland" and "Yankee Soul".
2011	22	"Flying Get"	A-side	Ranked 12th in 2011 General Election.
2011	23	"Kaze wa Fuiteiru"	A-side	
2011	24	"Ue kara Mariko"	B-side	Did not sing on title track; lineup was determined by rock-paper-scissors tournament; She sang on "Noël no Yoru"; and on "Rinjin wa Kizutsukanai" as Team A.
2012	25	"Give Me Five!"	A-side (Baby Blossom), Special Girls B	Sang in chorus with Baby Blossom; She also sang on "Hitsujikai no Tabi" as part of Special Girls B.
2012	26	"Manatsu no Sounds Good!"	A-side	She also sang on "Gugutasu no Sora".
2012	27	"Gingham Check"	Under Girls	Ranked 17th in 2012 General Election. Did not sing on title track. She sang on "Nante Bohemian".
2012	29	"Eien Pressure"	B-side	Did not sing on title track; lineup was determined by rock-paper-scissors tournament. Sang on "Totteoki Christmas" and "Watashitachi no Reason". She is now part of JKT48.
2013	31	"Sayonara Crawl"	A-side	She is credited as JKT48 Team J and AKB48 Team B for this single.
2013	32	"Koi Suru Fortune Cookie"	Under Girls	Did not sing on title track. Ranked 20th in 2013 General Election. Sang on "Ai no Imi wo Kangaete Mita".
2013	33	"Heart Electric"	Under Girls	Did not sing on title track. Sang on "Kaisoku to Doutai Shiryoku" and on "Tiny T-shirt" as Team B.
2013	34	"Suzukake no Ki no Michi de "Kimi no Hohoemi o Yume ni Miru" to Itte Shimattara Bokutachi no Kankei wa Dō Kawatte Shimau no ka, Bokunari ni Nannichi ka Kangaeta Ue de no Yaya Kihazukashii Ketsuron no Yō na Mono"	B-side	Did not sing on title track; lineup was determined by rock-paper-scissors tournament. Sang on "Mosh & Dive".
2014	35	"Mae Shika Mukanee"	Beauty Giraffes	Did not sing on title track. Sang on "Kimi no Uso wo Shitteita "
2014	36	"Labrador Retriever"	Team B	Did not sing on title track. Sang on "B Garden". She is now a full-time member of AKB48.
2014	37	"Kokoro no Placard"	Under Girls	Ranked 26th in 2014 General Election. Sang on "Dareka ga Nageta Ball"
2014	38	"Kibōteki Refrain"	Katareagumi (Cattleya Group)	Did not sing on title track. Sang on "Utaitai"
2015	41	"Halloween Night"	Under Girls	Ranked 30th in 2015 General Election. Sang on "Sayonara Surfboard"
2015	42	"Kuchibiru ni Be My Baby"	Team K	Did not sing on title track. Sang on "Oneesan no Hitorigoto"

=== Singles with JKT48 ===
Year	No.	Title	Role	Notes
2013	1	"River"	A-side	Debut with Team J.
2013	2	"Yuuhi wo miteiru ka?-Apakah Kau Melihat Mentari Senja?-"	B-side	Did not sing on title track. Sang on " Nagai Hikari- Cahaya Panjang -"
2013	3	"Fortune Cookie in Love -Fortune Cookie Yang Mencinta-"	A-side	Also sang on "First Rabbit"
2013	4	"Manatsu no Sounds Good! – Musim Panas Sounds Good!"		

=== Stage units ===
Team A 5th Stage (Renai Kinshi Jorei)

1. Kuroi Tenshi
2. Heart Gata Virus (backup for Haruna Kojima)

Team K 4th Stage (Saishuu Bell ga Naru) (backup for Sae Miyazawa)

Team K 5th Stage (Sakaagari)

1. Ai no Iro (backup for Sae Miyazawa)

Himawari Gumi 2nd Stage (Yume o Shinaseru wake ni wa Ikanai) in Theater G-Rosso

1. Tonari no Banana (Standby for Tomomi Kasai, Reina Fujie, Haruka Nakagawa, Misaki Iwasa)
2. Hajimete no Jelly Beans

(Standby for Sae Miyazawa, Reina Fujie, Haruka Nakagawa, Mariya Suzuki)

Team A 6th Stage (Mokugekisha)

1. Enjo Rosen

Team J 1st Stage (Renai Kinshi Jourei/Aturan Anti Cinta)

1. Renai Kinshi Jourei (Aturan Arti Cinta)

== Appearances ==
=== Movie ===
- Majisuka Gakuen (2010)
- Majisuka Gakuen 2 (2011)

=== Television ===
- AKB0ji59fun (July 28 – August 18, 2008, Nippon Television)
- AKBINGO (August 2008 – December 2015, Nippon Television)
- Shukan AKB (July 2009 –, TV Tokyo)
- Suiensaa (April 28, 5 May, May 12, 2009, January 5, 2010, NHK)
- Majisuka Gakuen (January 8 – March 26, 2010, TV Tokyo)
- Majisuka Gakuen 2(April 15–29, May 27, June 3, 17, 2011 TV Tokyo)
- SAVEPOINT (June 2014 -, TV Tokyo)
- Kasane (May 2015, TV Tokyo), Kayoi Tatarami

=== Radio ===
- AKB48 Ashita Made Mou Chotto (Nippon Cultural Broadcasting)
- AKB48 All Night Nippon (Nippon Broadcasting System)

== Publications ==
=== Photobooks ===
- B.L.T.U-17 Vol.9 Sizzleful Girl 2009 Winter (February 5, 2009, Tokyo News Service) ISBN 4863360401
- B.L.T.U-17 Vol.11 Sizzleful Girl 2009 Summer (August 5, 2009, Tokyo News Service) ISBN 4863360606

=== DVDs ===
- Takajō Aki Akicha to Kaerō (2010)
- Takajō Aki 2nd DVD Wonderland (2011)
