= Tomomi Kasai =

- 河西 智美
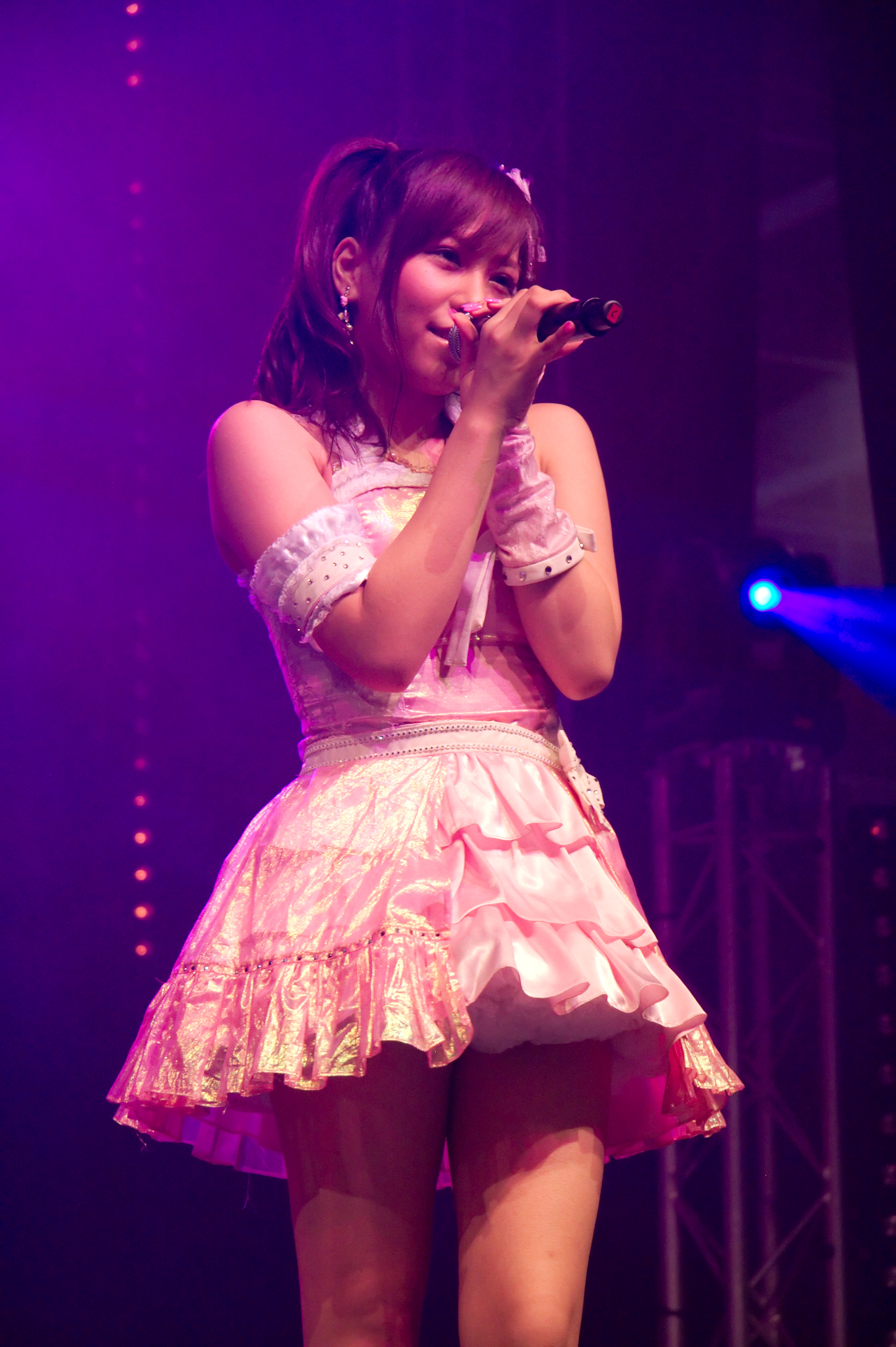
- Tomomi Kasai at Japan Expo 2009, Paris
- Born: November 16, 1991 (age 34); Tokyo, Japan
- Occupations: Japanese idol; singer; actress; voice actress
- Years active: 2006 – present
- Spouse: Keita Koyama (m. 2021)
- Children: 1
- Family: Rion Kasai (older sister)
- Musical career
- Genres: J-pop
- Instrument: Vocals
- Labels: DefStar, King, Nippon Crown
- Website: kasaitomomi.jp

Tomomi Kasai (河西 智美, Kasai Tomomi; born November 16, 1991 in Tokyo) is a Japanese singer, actress and a former member of the idol group AKB48, belonging to Team A. She had a recurring role on Kamen Rider W as Elizabeth, alongside group member Tomomi Itano. Together, they make up the sub-unit Queen & Elizabeth.

On November 10, 2012, it was announced she would be making her solo debut. On November 25, Kasai performed her solo song for the first time, the title announced as "Masaka" (まさか). It was released on December 26. On December 17, Kasai announced that she would leave the group. Her farewell ceremony was on May 3, 2013.

== Personal life ==
She is the younger sister of former singer Rion Kasai.

On May 15, 2021, Kasai announced her marriage to acrobat gymnast and actor Keita Koyama. She gave birth to their first child, a daughter in 2022.

== Discography ==
=== Solo singles ===
- "Masaka" (まさか) (2012) - Sales: 44,982
- "Mine" (2013) - Sales: 22,417
- "Kietaikurai" (キエタイクライ) (2014) - Sales: 13,697
- "Ima Sara Sara" (今さらさら) (2014) - Sales: 7,152

=== Albums ===
- "STAR-T!" (2017) - Sales: 3,000

=== With AKB48 ===
Year	No.	Title	Role	Notes
2006	1	"Aitakatta"	A-side	Debut with Team K.
2007	2	"Seifuku ga Jama o Suru"	A-side	
2007	3	"Keibetsu Shiteita Aijō"	A-side	
2007	4	"Bingo!"	A-side	
2007	5	"Boku no Taiyō"	A-side	
2007	6	"Yūhi o Miteiru ka?"	A-side	
2008	7	"Romance, Irane"	A-side	
2008	8	"Sakura no Hanabiratachi 2008"	A-side	
2008	9	"Baby! Baby! Baby!"	A-side	
2008	10	"Ōgoe Diamond"	A-side	
2009	11	"10nen Sakura"	A-side	Also sang on "Sakurairo no Sora no Shita de"
2009	12	"Namida Surprise!"	A-side	
2009	13	"Iiwake Maybe"	A-side	Ranked 10th in 2009 General Election
2009	14	"River"	A-side	
2010	15	"Sakura no Shiori"	A-side	First single as member of Team B. Also sang on "Choose Me!"
2010	16	"Ponytail to Shushu"	A-side	Also sang on "Majijo Teppen Blues"
2010	17	"Heavy Rotation"	A-side	Ranked 12th in 2010 General Election. Also sang on "Yasai Sisters".
2010	18	"Beginner"	A-side, Mint	Also sang on "Kimi ni Tsuite" as subgroup Mint.
2010	19	"Chance no Junban"	A-side	Placed 13th in rock-paper-scissors tournament. Also sang on "Yoyakushita Christmas" and "Love Jump".
2011	20	"Sakura no Ki ni Narō"	A-side, Mint	Also sang on "Kiss Made 100 Mile" as Mint.
2011	--	"Dareka no Tame ni - What can I do for someone?"	--	charity single
2011	21	"Everyday, Katyusha"	A-side	Also sang on "Korekara Wonderland" and "Yankee Soul".
2011	22	"Flying Get"	A-side	Ranked 16th in 2011 General Election.
2011	23	"Kaze wa Fuiteiru"	A-side	
2011	24	"Ue kara Mariko"	A-side	Placed in main group from rock-paper-scissors tournament; She sang on "Noël no Yoru", and on "Yobisute Fantasy" as Team B.
2012	25	"Give Me Five!"	A-side (Baby Blossom), Special Girls B	Sang in chorus in Baby Blossom; she also sang on "Hitsujikai no Tabi" as Special Girls B.
2012	26	"Manatsu no Sounds Good!"	A-side	
2012	27	"Gingham Check"	A-side	Ranked 12th in 2012 General Election. Her last participation in A-Side
2012	28	"Uza"	B-side	Sang on "Kodoku na Hoshizora" as New Team A.
2012	29	"Eien Pressure"	B-side	Did not place in rock-paper-scissors tournament. Sang on "Eien Yori Tsuzuku Yō ni" as OKL48.
2013	30	"So Long!"	B-side	Sang on "Ruby" as Team A. Last single to participate
2014	36	"Labrador Retriever"	B-side	Did not participate in title song. Participated in "Kyō made no Melody" as graduated member.

=== With SKE48 ===
Year	No.	Title	Role	Notes
2016	19	"Chicken Line"	B-side	Sang on "Tabi no Tochū". Participated as graduated member.

=== as Queen & Elizabeth ===
- "Love Wars" (Kamen Rider W soundtrack)

=== Theatre ===
- Peter Pan (2018–2019) Wendy Darling
- Annie (2020–2021) Lily St. Regis

== Stage units ==
- Team K 1st Stage: Hoshi no Ondo (星の温度)
- Team K 2nd Stage: Kinjirareta Futari (禁じられた2人)
- Team K 2nd Stage: Fushidara na Natsu (ふしだらな夏)
- Team K 3rd Stage: Maria
- Himawari Gumi 1st Stage: Idol Nante Yobanaide (アイドルなんて呼ばないで)
- Himawari Gumi 2nd Stage: Tonari no Banana (となりのバナナ)
- Team K 4th Stage: Oshibe to Meshibe to Yoru no Chouchou (おしべとめしべと夜の蝶々)
- Team K 5th Stage: Dakishimeraretara (抱きしめられたら)
- Team B 5th Stage: Candy (キャンディー)
- Team A 2nd Stage: Nageki no Figure (嘆きのフィギュア) (May 28, 2005, replacing Atsuko Maeda)

== Filmography ==
=== Television ===
- ICE: Aoi
- Kamen Rider W: Elizabeth
- Digimon Xros Wars: Bastemon (Voice)
- Meshibana Keiji Tachibana (2013): Muranaka

=== Movies ===
- Kamen Rider × Kamen Rider W & Decade: Movie War 2010 (2009) as Elizabeth
- Kamen Rider W Forever: A to Z/The Gaia Memories of Fate (2010) as Elizabeth
- Neck (2010) as Mao
- Kamen Rider × Kamen Rider OOO & W Featuring Skull: Movie War Core (2010) as Elizabeth
