= Tsugi no Ashiato =

Studio album by AKB48
- Released: January 22, 2014
- Genre: J-pop
- Label: You, Be Cool! / King
- Producer: Yasushi Akimoto

AKB48 chronology
1830m (2012)	Tsugi no Ashiato (2014)	Koko ga Rhodes da, Koko de Tobe! (2015)

Singles from Tsugi no Ashiato
- 1. "Manatsu no Sounds Good!" Released: May 23, 2012; 2. "Gingham Check" Released: August 29, 2012; 3. "UZA" Released: October 31, 2012; 4. "Eien Pressure" Released: December 5, 2012; 5. "So Long!" Released: February 20, 2013; 6. "Sayonara Crawl" Released: May 22, 2013; 7. "Koi Suru Fortune Cookie" Released: August 21, 2013

Tsugi no Ashiato (次の足跡; "The Next Footsteps") is the third studio album by Japanese idol girl group AKB48. It is the second AKB48 double-album, and was released in Japan on January 22, 2014, by King Records. It debuted at number one in the weekly Oricon Albums Chart, selling over 960,000 copies. On February 6, the album became AKB48's second successive album to sell over one million copies.

== Promotion and release ==
On 24 November 2013, it was announced that AKB48 would release their 5th studio album, their first in over a year. It was revealed that the album would have 25 songs, including songs such as Manatsu no Sounds Good! and Koisuru Fortune Cookie from their previous singles. The album title, cover and tracks were subsequently reviewed on 21 December 2013. It was also announced that 15 of the tracks were written for this album, and that many of the songs were sung by different units within AKB48. This album is marketed under the catchphrase Our footprints are ahead of us.

The album was released in Japan on January 22, 2014, under King Records in Japan, in several editions: Type A limited, Type A regular, Type B, and Theater. The albums consist of 2 CDs. The Type A limited contains a bonus DVD. The Theater edition is only sold at the AKB48 theater and only contains the first CD.

The first CD (CD1) includes seven of AKB48's singles that were released in 2012–2013, from "Manatsu no Sounds Good!" to "Koi Suru Fortune Cookie". It includes original songs performed by Team Kenkyusei, as well as songs that were B-sides of singles. The second CD (CD2) has different track lists for Type A and Type B. It contains more B-side singles as well as original songs by AKB48 members. The limited edition has a DVD which shows a short documentary of the group members at a concert.

The seven singles and their B-sides were also sung by and with famous members, currently graduated from AKB48 Tomomi Itano, Mariko Shinoda, Sayaka Akimoto, Tomomi Kasai or Atsuko Maeda. Therefore, these members are not credited in the album.

== Track listing ==
All songs performed by the AKB48 title track singers except as listed below.

No.	Title	Performance	Length
1.	"Koi Suru Fortune Cookie" (恋するフォーチュンクッキー)		4:46
2.	"Love Shugyō" (Love修行)	Kenkyuusei	4:41
3.	"Sayonara Crawl" (さよならクロール)		4:56
4.	"Tsuyoi Hana" (強い花)	Kenkyuusei
5.	"Ano Hi no Fūrin" (あの日の風鈴)	Waiting Girls
6.	"Eien Pressure" (永遠プレッシャー)		4:57
7.	"Aozora Café" (青空カフェ)
8.	"Uza" (UZA)
9.	"Kimi no Tame ni Boku wa…" (君のために僕は・・・)	Stage Fighter
10.	"Watashitachi no Reason" (私たちのReason)
11.	"So Long!"
12.	"Gingham Check" (ギンガムチェック)
13.	"Manatsu no Sounds Good!" (真夏のSounds Good !)		4:35
14.	"Otona e no Michi" (大人への道 "The Road to Adulthood")	Kenkyuusei

Theater Edition
No.	Title	Length
15.	"Chireba ii no ni..." (散ればいいのに・・・)

Type A – Disc 2
No.	Title	Performance	Length
1.	"After Rain"
2.	"Gugutasu no Sora" (ぐぐたすの空)
3.	"Boy Hunt no Hōhō Oshiemasu" (ボーイハントの方法 教えます)	Yuria Kizaki, Rino Sashihara, Haruka Shimazaki, Fuuko Yagura
4.	"JJ ni Karitamono" (JJに借りたもの)	Ayaka Umeda, Rie Kitahara, Asuka Kuramochi, Minami Takahashi, Akane Takayanagi, Nana Yamada
5.	"Shower no Ato Dakara" (シャワーの後だから)	Yuki Kashiwagi, Haruna Kojima, Rena Matsui
6.	"10 Krone to Pan" (10クローネとパン)	Haruka Kodama, Reina Fujie, Nao Furuhata, Sayaka Yamamoto, Yui Yokoyama
7.	"Kakushin ga Moterumono" (確信がもてるもの)	Team A
8.	"Team Zaka" (チーム坂)	Team 4
9.	"Tsuyosa to Yowasa no Aida de" (強さと弱さの間で)
10.	"Boku wa Ganbaru" (僕は頑張る)	Anna Iriyama, Rina Kawaei, Minami Takahashi, Yui Yokoyama, Mayu Watanabe, Yuko Oshima, Yuki Kashiwagi, Haruna Kojima, Haruka Shimazaki
11.	"Eien yori Tsuzuku Yō ni" (永遠より続くように)	OKL48

Type A limited edition DVD
No.	Title	Length
1.	"AKB48 Group Members Air Handshake Event" (AKB48グループメンバー エア握手会)

Type B – Disc 2
No.	Title	Performance	Length
1.	"Smile Kamikakushi" (スマイル神隠し)	Tentoumu Chu!
2.	"Taningyōgi na Sunset Beach" (他人行儀なSunset Beach)	Aika Ota, Akari Suda, Suzuran Yamauchi, Miyuki Watanabe
3.	"Haste to Waste" (ハステとワステ)	BKA48
4.	"Watashi Leaf" (わたしリーフ)	Anna Iriyama, Rena Kato, Rina Kawaei, Jurina Matsui
5.	"Stoic na Bigaku" (Stoicな美学)	Miori Ichikawa, Mina Oba, Kanon Kimoto, Fuuko Yagura, Nako Yabuki, Shu Yabushita, Mayu Watanabe
6.	"Ponkotsu Blues" (ぽんこつブルース)
7.	"Ichi Ni no San" (イチニノサン)	Yuko Oshima, Aki Takajo, Mariya Nagao, Airi Furukawa, Minami Minegishi
8.	"Kyōhansha" (共犯者)	Team K
9.	"Dōki" (動機)	Haruka Shimazaki
10.	"Kanashiki Kinkyori Ren'ai" (悲しき近距離恋愛)	Team B
11.	"Yume no Kawa" (夢の河)

== Personnel ==
After rain

- Team A : Minami Takahashi, Yui Yokoyama, Mayu Watanabe
- Team K : Yuko Oshima, Rie Kitahara
- Team B : Yuki Kashiwagi, Haruna Kojima, Haruka Shimazaki
- Team 4 : Minami Minegishi
- SKE48 Team S / AKB48 Team K : Jurina Matsui
- SKE48 Team S : Anna Ishida
- NMB48 Team N / AKB48 Team B : Miyuki Watanabe
- NMB48 Team N : Riho Kotani
- HKT48 Team H : Aika Ota, Rino Sashihara
- JKT48 Team J / AKB48 Team B : Aki Takajo
- JKT48 Team J : Haruka Nakagawa
- SNH48 Team SII / AKB48 Team A : Mariya Suzuki
- SNH48 Team SII : Sae Miyazawa
- Graduated Members (not credited) : Tomomi Itano, Mariko Shinoda

Boy Hunt no Houhou Oshiemasu (Centers: Haruka Shimazaki and Rino Sashihara)

- Team B: Haruka Shimazaki
- SKE48 Team S: Yuria Kizaki
- NMB48 Team: M: Fuuko Yagura
- HKT48 Team H: Rino Sashihara

JJ ni Kitaramono (Centers: Minami Takahashi and Asuka Kuramochi)

- Team A: Minami Takahashi
- Team K: Rie Kitahara, Asuka Kuramochi
- SKE48 Team KII: Akane Takayanagi
- NMB48 Team M / SKE48 Team KII: Nana Yamada

Shower no Ato Dakara (Center: Haruna Kojima

- Team B: Yuki Kashiwagi, Haruna Kojima
- SKE48 Team E: Rena Matsui

10 Krone to Pan (Center: Sayaka Yamamoto)

- Team A: Yui Yokoyama
- Team B: Reina Fujie
- HKT48 Team H / AKB48 Team K: Haruka Kodama
- SKE48 Team E: Nao Furuhata
- NMB48 Team N / AKB48 Team K: Sayaka Yamamoto

Kakushin ga Moterumono (Center: Mayu Watanabe)

- Team A: Rina Izuta, Anna Iriyama, Karen Iwata, Ryoka Oshima, Rina Kawaei, Ayaka Kikuchi, Haruka Kodama, Marina Kobayashi, Yukari Sasaki, Sumire Sato, Mariya Suzuki, Juri Takahashi, Minami Takahashi, Yūka Tano, Sakiko Matsui, Ayaka Morikawa, Fuuko Yagura, Yui Yokoyama, Mayu Watanabe

Tsuyosa to Yowasa no Aida de (Center: Sayaka Akimoto)

- Team K : Yuko Oshima, Kana Kobayashi
- Team B : Ayaka Umeda
- SNH48 Team SII: Sae Miyazawa
- Graduated Members (not credited) : Sayaka Akimoto, Megumi Ohori, Tomomi Kasai, Kayo Noro, Yuka Masuda, Natsumi Matsubara

Note = This song commemorated Sayaka Akimoto's graduation from AKB48 in August 2013

Smile Kamikakushi

- Artist: Tentoumu Chu! (てんとうむChu！)
- Team 4: Nana Okada, Mako Kojima, Miki Nishino
- SKE48 Kenkyuusei : Ryoha Kitagawa
- NMB48 Kenkyuusei : Nagisa Shibuya
- HKT48 Kenkyuusei : Meru Tashima, Mio Tomonaga

Ponkotsu Blues

- Team A : Anna Iriyama, Rina Kawaei, Juri Takahashi
- Team K : Maria Abe, Haruka Shimada, Mariya Nagao
- Team B : Rena Kato, Haruka Shimazaki, Miyu Takeuchi, Suzuran Yamauchi
- AKB48 Team B / SKE48 Team KII: Mina Oba
- AKB48 Team B / NMB48 Team N: Miori Ichikawa
- SKE48 Team S / AKB48 Team K : Jurina Matsui
- SKE48 Team S : Yuria Kizaki
- SKE48 Team E : Kanon Kimoto
- HKT48 Team H : Anna Murashige

Ichi Ni No San

- Team K: Yuko Oshima, Mariya Nagao
- Team 4: Minami Minegishi
- SKE48 Team KII: Airi Furukawa
- JKT48 Team J: Aki Takajo

Kyōhansha

- Team K: Maria Abe, Mayumi Uchida, Yuko Oshima, Rie Kitahara, Asuka Kuramochi, Kana Kobayashi, Amina Sato, Haruka Shimada, Shihori Suzuki, Rina Chikano, Chisato Nakata, Mariya Nagao, Rena Nozawa, Rina Hirata, Nana Fujita, Nao Furuhata, Ami Maeda, Miho Miyazaki, Tomu Muto
- SKE48 Team S / AKB48 Team K: Jurina Matsui

Dōki'

- Team B: Haruka Shimazaki

Kanashiki Kinkyori Renai

- Team B: Haruka Ishida, Miori Ichikawa, Misaki Iwasa, Ayaka Umeda, Mina Oba, Miyuu Omori, Shizuka Ōya, Yuki Kashiwagi, Haruka Katayama, Rena Kato, Natsuki Kojima, Haruna Kojima, Haruka Shimazaki, Aki Takajo, Miyu Takeuchi, Miku Tanabe, Mariko Nakamura, Wakana Natori, Misato Nonaka, Reina Fujie, Suzuran Yamauchi, Miyuki Watanabe

Chireba Ii no ni...

- Kenkyuusei: Manami Ichikawa, Rio Ōkawa, Nana Owada, Haruka Komiyama, Kiara Sato, Makiho Tatsuya, Seina Fukuoka, Mion Mukaichi, Ami Yumoto

== Release history ==
Date	Version	Catalog	Format	Label
January 22, 2014	Type-A	First Press Limited Edition (KIZC-90240~2)	2CD+DVD	King Records
January 22, 2014	Type-A	Regular Edition (KICS-3014～5)	2CD	King Records
January 22, 2014	Type-B	(KICS-3016～7)	2CD	King Records
January 22, 2014	Theater	(NKCD-6655)	CD	King Records

== Charts ==
Chart	Peak position	Sales (copies)
Oricon Weekly Chart	1	961,531
Oricon Year-end Chart	1	1,041,355
Taiwan(G-Music)	13	

=== Certifications ===
Certification	Sales (copies)
RIAJ physical shipping certification	Million

== Release history ==
Region	Date	Format	Label
Japan	January 22, 2014	CD; digital download; streaming	King Records (YOU BE COOL division)
Hong Kong, Taiwan	January 22, 2014	CD; digital download; streaming	King Records
Philippines	November 6, 2015	CD (limited release); digital download; streaming	PolyEast Records (Galaxy division); King
South Korea	July 27, 2018	digital download; streaming	Stone Music Entertainment; Genie Music; King
