= Miorin =

Miorin is a surname. Notable people with the surname include:

- Devis Miorin (born 1976), Italian cyclist
- Hugues Miorin (born 1968), French rugby union player

== See also ==
- Miori
