= Eien Pressure =

Single by AKB48

from the album Tsugi no Ashiato
- B-side: "Totteoki Christmas"; "Tsuyogari Tokei" (Type-A); "Ha!" (Type-B); "Hatsukoi Butterfly" (Type-C); "Eien Yori Tsuzuku Yō ni" (Type-D); "Watashitachi no Reason" (Theater Edition)
- Released: December 5, 2012 (Japan)
- Genre: J-pop
- Label: You, Be Cool! / King
- Songwriter(s): Yasushi Akimoto (lyrics)
- Producer(s): Yasushi Akimoto

AKB48 singles chronology
"Uza" (2012)	"Eien Pressure" (2012)	"So Long!" (2013)

Music videos
- AKB48 "Eien Pressure" on YouTube
- NMB48 - "Ha!" (preview) on YouTube
- HKT48 - "Hatsukoi Butterfly" on YouTube

"Eien Pressure" (永遠プレッシャー, Eien Puresshā; "Eternal Pressure") is the 29th major single by the Japanese female idol group AKB48, released in Japan on December 5, 2012.

== Background ==
The sixteen members that were featured in the title track were decided in the AKB48 rock-paper-scissors tournament held in September along with their position at Nippon Budokan. The overall winner of the tournament was Haruka Shimazaki, who sang the lead vocals for the song and took up the center position during its performances, and it is also her first solo center.

The single was released in five versions: Type-A, Type-B, Type-C, Type-D, and Theater Edition.

The third tracks of the DVDs that come with Types A, B, and C are music videos for the songs that placed, respectively, first, second, and third in the recently held Music Video Request, in which fans could vote for a song to get a music video.

Its music video was directed by Eiki Takahashi (also director of Keibetsu Shiteita Aijō). It premiered on MTV Japan.

This is also the first single where Kojima Haruna does not participate in the single's A-side track.

== Track listing ==
All lyrics written by Yasushi Akimoto, except "Eien Yori Tsuzuku Yō ni". "Eien Yori Tsuzuku Yō ni" is written by Hisaya Okada (Mecha-Mecha Iketeru!'s staff).

=== Type-A ===
CD
No.	Title	Artist(s)	Length
1.	"Eien Pressure" (永遠プレッシャー Eien Puresshā)
2.	"Totteoki Christmas" (とっておきクリスマス Totteoki Kurisumasu)
3.	"Tsuyogari Tokei" (強がり時計)	SKE48
4.	"Eien Pressure off vocal ver." (永遠プレッシャー off vocal ver.)
5.	"Totteoki Christmas off vocal ver." (とっておきクリスマス off vocal ver.)
6.	"Tsuyogari Tokei off vocal ver." (強がり時計 off vocal ver.)

DVD
No.	Title	Length
1.	"Eien Pressure Music Video" (永遠プレッシャー Music Video)
2.	"Totteoki Christmas Music Video" (とっておきクリスマス Music Video)
3.	"Tsuyogari Tokei Music Video" (強がり時計 Music Video)
4.	"Team B Oshi" (チームB推し Music Video Chīmu Bī Oshi)
5.	"29th Single Senbatsu Janken Taikai Document (Zenpen)" (29thシングル選抜じゃんけん大会ドキュメント（前編）)

=== Type-B ===
CD
No.	Title	Artist(s)	Length
1.	"Eien Pressure" (永遠プレッシャー Eien Puresshā)
2.	"Totteoki Christmas" (とっておきクリスマス Totteoki Kurisumasu)
3.	"Ha!" (HA!)	NMB48
4.	"Eien Pressure off vocal ver." (永遠プレッシャー off vocal ver.)
5.	"Totteoki Christmas off vocal ver." (とっておきクリスマス off vocal ver.)
6.	"Ha! off vocal ver." (HA! off vocal ver.)

DVD
No.	Title	Length
1.	"Eien Pressure Music Video" (永遠プレッシャー Music Video)
2.	"Totteoki Christmas Music Video" (とっておきクリスマス Music Video)
3.	"Ha! Music Video" (HA! Music Video)
4.	"First Rabbit Music Video" (ファースト・ラビット Music Video)
5.	"29th Single Senbatsu Janken Taikai Document (Chūhen)" (29thシングル選抜じゃんけん大会ドキュメント（中編）)

=== Type-C ===
CD
No.	Title	Artist(s)	Length
1.	"Eien Pressure" (永遠プレッシャー Eien Puresshā)
2.	"Totteoki Christmas" (とっておきクリスマス Totteoki Kurisumasu)
3.	"Hatsukoi Butterfly" (初恋バタフライ Hatsukoi Batefurai)	HKT48
4.	"Eien Pressure off vocal ver." (永遠プレッシャー off vocal ver.)
5.	"Totteoki Christmas off vocal ver." (とっておきクリスマス off vocal ver.)
6.	"Hatsukoi Butterfly off vocal ver." (初恋バタフライ off vocal ver.)

DVD
No.	Title	Length
1.	"Eien Pressure Music Video" (永遠プレッシャー Music Video)
2.	"Totteoki Christmas Music Video" (とっておきクリスマス Music Video)
3.	"Hatsukoi Butterfly Music Video" (初恋バタフライ Music Video)
4.	"Sakura no Hanabiratachi (Maeda Atsuko solo ver.) Music Video" (桜の花びら〜前田敦子solo ver.〜 Music Video)
5.	"29th Single Senbatsu Janken Taikai Document (Kōhen)" (29thシングル選抜じゃんけん大会ドキュメント（後編）)

=== Type-D ===
CD
No.	Title	Artist(s)	Length
1.	"Eien Pressure" (永遠プレッシャー Eien Puresshā)
2.	"Totteoki Christmas" (とっておきクリスマス Totteoki Kurisumasu)
3.	"Eien Yori Tsuzuku Yō ni" (永遠より続くように)	OKL48
4.	"Eien Pressure off vocal ver." (永遠プレッシャー off vocal ver.)
5.	"Totteoki Christmas off vocal ver." (とっておきクリスマス off vocal ver.)
6.	"Eien Yori Tsuzuku Yō ni off vocal ver." (永遠より続くように off vocal ver.)

DVD
No.	Title	Length
1.	"Eien Pressure Music Video" (永遠プレッシャー Music Video)
2.	"Totteoki Christmas Music Video" (とっておきクリスマス Music Video)
3.	"Eien Yori Tsuzuku Yō ni Music Video" (永遠より続くように Music Video)

=== Theater Version ===
CD
No.	Title	Length
1.	"Eien Pressure" (永遠プレッシャー Eien Puresshā)
2.	"Totteoki Christmas" (とっておきクリスマス Totteoki Kurisumasu)
3.	"Watashitachi no Reason" (私たちのReason Watashitachi no Rīzon)
4.	"Eien Pressure off vocal ver." (永遠プレッシャー off vocal ver.)
5.	"Totteoki Christmas off vocal ver." (とっておきクリスマス off vocal ver.)
6.	"Watashitachi no Reason off vocal ver." (私たちのReason off vocal ver.)

== Members ==
=== "Eien Pressure" ===
Center: Haruka Shimazaki The rank of each member in the AKB48 29th single selection rock-paper-scissors tournament is in parentheses.

- Team A: Mariko Shinoda (5), Moeno Nito (2)
- Team K: Maria Abe (6), Tomomi Itano (13), Mayumi Uchida (4), Chisato Nakata (16), Ami Maeda (10), Natsumi Matsubara (14)
- Team B: Ayaka Umeda (15), Yuki Kashiwagi (11), Haruka Shimazaki (1), Miyu Takeuchi (7), Mariko Nakamura (8)
- AKB48 Team A / NMB48: Yui Yokoyama (3)
- SKE48 Team E: Kasumi Ueno (9), Kanon Kimoto (12)

=== "Totteoki Christmas" ===
- Team A：Rina Kawaei, Minami Takahashi, Mayu Watanabe, Yui Yokoyama (NMB48)
- Team K：Tomomi Itano, Yūko Ōshima, Rie Kitahara (SKE48)
- Team B：Yuki Kashiwagi, Haruna Kojima, Haruka Shimazaki, Minami Minegishi
- JKT48: Aki Takajo

=== "Tsuyogari Tokei" ===
The song is performed by SKE48.

- AKB48 Team K / SKE48：Rie Kitahara
- SKE48 Team S / AKB48 Team K：Jurina Matsui
- SKE48 Team S：Masana Ōya, Yuria Kizaki, Akari Suda, Yūka Nakanishi, Rena Matsui, Kumi Yagami
- SKE48 Team KII / AKB48 Team B：Anna Ishida
- SKE48 Team KII：Shiori Ogiso, Akane Takayanagi, Sawako Hata, Airi Furukawa, Manatsu Mukaida, Miki Yakata
- SKE48 Team E：Kanon Kimoto

=== "Ha!" ===
The song is performed by NMB48.

- NMB48 Team N：Yui Yokoyama (AKB48 Team A), Riho Kotani (AKB48 Team A), Miyuki Watanabe (AKB48 Team B), Mayu Ogasawara, Rina Kondō, Megumi Uenishi, Miru Shiroma, Aina Fukumoto, Nana Yamada, Sayaka Yamamoto, Akari Yoshida
- NMB48 Team M：Rena Shimada, Airi Tanigawa, Fuuko Yagura
- NMB48 Team BII：Yūka Kato, Shu Yabushita

=== "Hatsukoi Butterfly" ===
The song is performed by HKT48.

- HKT48 Team H：Chihiro Anai, Nao Ueki, Aika Ota, Haruka Kodama, Rino Sashihara, Yuki Shimono, Chiyori Nakanishi, Natsumi Matsuoka, Sakura Miyawaki, Anna Murashige, Aoi Motomura, Madoka Moriyasu, Haruka Wakatabe
- HKT48 Kenkyūsei：Meru Tashima, Mio Tomonaga, Mai Fuchigami

=== "Eien Yori Tsuzuku Yō ni" ===
The song is performed by OKL48 which is the member is selected from "AKB48" who lose at Janken tournament for single "Eien Pressure" .
(Center: Takashi Okamura as "Oka Lemon", which "OKL" is named after)

- Team A: Anna Iriyama, Rina Kawaei, Tomomi Kasai, Mayu Watanabe
- Team K: Yūko Ōshima, Asuka Kuramochi, Mariya Nagao, Rie Kitahara (SKE48)
- Team B: Miori Ichikawa, Shizuka Ōya, Rena Katō, Haruna Kojima, Mika Komori, Reina Fujie, Minami Minegishi
- Ninety-nine: Takashi Okamura

=== "Watashitachi no Reason" ===
- Team A: Rina Izuta, Karen Iwata, Ryōka Ōshima, Ayaka Kikuchi, Marina Kobayashi, Sumire Satō, Natsuki Satō (Last Single), Juri Takahashi, Yūka Tano, Tomomi Nakatsuka, Shiori Nakamata, Sakiko Matsui, Ayaka Morikawa
- Team K: Sayaka Akimoto, Kana Kobayashi, Amina Satō, Haruka Shimada, Shihori Suzuki, Rina Chikano, Sayaka Nakaya, Nana Fujita, Yuka Masuda (Last Single), Miho Miyazaki, Tomu Muto, Jurina Matsui (SKE48 Team S)
- Team B: Haruka Ishida, Misaki Iwasa, Mina Ōba, Haruka Katayama, Natsuki Kojima, Miku Tanabe, Wakana Natori, Misato Nonaka, Suzuran Yamauchi, Miyuki Watanabe (NMB48 Team N)
- Team Kaigai: Aki Takajo (JKT48), Haruka Nakagawa (JKT48), Mariya Suzuki (SNH48), Sae Miyazawa (SNH48)
- Team Kenkyūsei: Moe Aigasa, Saho Iwatate, Natsuki Uchiyama, Ayano Umeta, Miyū Ōmori, Ayaka Okada, Nana Okada, Saki Kitazawa, Mako Kojima, Yukari Sasaki, Ayana Shinozaki, Yurina Takashima, Miki Nishino, Hikari Hashimoto, Rina Hirata, Mitsuki Maeda, Yuiri Murayama, Shinobu Mogi

== Charts ==
=== Oricon charts ===
Release	Oricon Singles Chart	Peak position	Debut sales (copies)	Sales total (copies)
December 5, 2012	Daily Chart	1	840,043	1,197,373
December 5, 2012	Weekly Chart	1	1,073,499	1,197,373
December 5, 2012	Monthly Chart	1	1,165,527	1,197,373
December 5, 2012	Yearly Chart	5	1,073,499	1,197,373

=== Year-end charts ===
"Eien Pressure" was grouped with the 2013 year for Billboard Japan.

Chart (2013)	Position
Billboard Japan Hot 100	5
Billboard Japan Hot Singles Sales	6
