= Rashikunai =

- Rashikunai Type A Limited Edition Cover

Single by NMB48
- Released: November 5, 2014 (Japan)
- Genre: J-pop
- Label: laugh out loud records

NMB48 singles chronology
"Takane no Ringo" (2014)	"Rashikunai" (2014)	"Don't look back!" (2015)

"Rashikunai" (らしくない) is the 10th single by Japanese idol girl group NMB48. It was released on November 5, 2014. It debuted in number one on the weekly Oricon Singles Chart. As of December 15, 2014 (issue date), it has sold a total of 449,983 copies. It reached the second place on the Billboard Japan Hot 100. It was the 16th best-selling single of the year in Japan, with 449,983 copies.

== Background ==
This single will be released in 4 versions: Type A, Type B, Type C and Theater edition. The title song was first performed during NMB48's 4th Anniversary Live on October 14, 2014.

== Track list ==
=== Type-A ===
CD
No.	Title	Artist(s)	Length
1.	"Rashikunai" (らしくない)		4:07
2.	"Tomodachi" (友達)	Yamada Nana, Yamamoto Sayaka
3.	"Kyusen Kyotei" (休戦協定)	Team N
4.	"Rashikunai (Off vocal)"
5.	"Tomodachi (Off vocal)"
6.	"Kyusen Kyotei (Off vocal)"

DVD
No.	Title	Length
1.	"Rashikunai (Music Video)"
2.	"Rashikunai (Music Video Dance Version)"
3.	"Kyusen Kyotei (Music Video)"
4.	"Bonus Video: Kotani Riho's Solo Performance <summary>"

=== Type-B ===
CD
No.	Title	Artist(s)	Length
1.	"Rashikunai" (らしくない)		4:07
2.	"Tomodachi" (友達)	Yamada Nana, Yamamoto Sayaka
3.	"Migi ni Shiteru Ring" (右にしてるリング)	Team M
4.	"Rashikunai (Off vocal)"
5.	"Tomodachi (Off vocal)"
6.	"Migi ni Shiteru Ring (Off vocal)"

DVD
No.	Title	Length
1.	"Rashikunai (Music Video)"
2.	"Rashikunai (Music Video Dance Version)"
3.	"Migi ni Shiteru Ring (Music Video)"
4.	"Bonus Video: Hajimete no Burari Futari Tabi <Akashi Natsuko/Yamao Rina>"
5.	"Bonus Video: Hajimete no Burari Hitori Tabi <Sutou Ririka>"

=== Type-C ===
CD
No.	Title	Artist(s)	Length
1.	"Rashikunai" (らしくない)		4:07
2.	"Tomodachi" (友達)	Yamada Nana, Yamamoto Sayaka
3.	"Star ni Nante Naritakunai" (スターになんてなりたくない)	Team BII
4.	"Rashikunai (Off vocal)"
5.	"Tomodachi (Off vocal)"
6.	"Star ni Nante Naritakunai (Off vocal)"

DVD
No.	Title	Length
1.	"Rashikunai (Music Video)"
2.	"Rashikunai (Music Video Dance Version)"
3.	"Star ni Nante Naritakunai (Music Video)"
4.	"Bonus Video: NMB48 feat. Yoshimoto Shin Kigeki Vol.10"

=== Theater edition ===
CD
No.	Title	Artist(s)	Length
1.	"Rashikunai" (らしくない)		4:07
2.	"Tomodachi" (友達)	Yamada Nana, Yamamoto Sayaka
3.	"Asphalt no Namida" (アスファルトの涙)	Kenkyuusei
4.	"Rashikunai (Off vocal)"
5.	"Tomodachi (Off vocal)"
6.	"Asphalt no Namida (Off vocal)"

== Members ==
=== Rashikunai ===
Team N: Yuki Kashiwagi, Yuuka Kato, Riho Kotani, Kei Jonishi, Aika Nishimura, Sayaka Yamamoto, Akari Yoshida
Team M: Miru Shiroma, Momoka Kinoshita, Airi Tanigawa, Reina Fujie, Sae Murase, Fuuko Yagura, Nana Yamada, Rina Kushiro
Team BII: Miori Ichikawa, Ayaka Umeda, Kanako Kadowaki, Nagisa Shibuya, Akane Takayanagi, Shu Yabushita, Miyuki Watanabe

=== Tomodachi ===
Team N: Sayaka Yamamoto
Team M: Nana Yamada

=== Kyusen Kyotei ===
Team N: Yuuri Ota, Yuki Kashiwagi, Yuuka Kato, Rika Kishino, Saki Kono, Narumi Koga, Riho Kotani, Kei Jonishi, Ririka Sutou, Aika Nishimura, Anna Murashige, Kanako Muro, Tsubasa Yamauchi, Natsumi Yamagishi, Yuki Yamaguchi, Sayaka Yamamoto, Akari Yoshida

=== Migi ni Shiteru Ring ===
Team M: Yuki Azuma, Akari Ishizuka, Ayaka Okita, Rena Kawakami, Momoka Kinoshita, Rina Kushiro, Rina Kondo, Miru Shiroma, Yui Takano, Sara Takei, Airi Tanigawa, Reina Fujie, Arisa Miura, Mao Mita, Ayaka Murakami, Sae Murase, Fuuko Yagura, Nana Yamada

=== Star ni Nante Naritakunai ===
Team BII: Anna Ijiri, Kanae Iso, Miori Ichikawa, Mirei Ueda, Ayaka Umeda, Kanako Kadowaki, Emika Kamieda, Chihiro Kawakami, Haruna Kinoshita, Konomi Kusaka, Hazuki Kurokawa, Nagisa Shibuya, Akane Takayanagi, Kokoro Naiki, Momoka Hayashi, Shu Yabushita, Miyuki Watanabe

=== Asphalt no Namida ===
Kenkyuusei: Natsuko Akashi, Yuumi Ishida, Mizuki Uno, Mai Odan, Eriko Jo, Honoka Terui, Reina Nakano, Rurina Nishizawa, Chiho Matsuoka, Megumi Matsumura, Ayaka Morita, Rina Yamao
