= Sayaka Yamamoto =

Japanese musician (born 1993)

Sayaka Yamamoto 山本 彩
- Born: July 14, 1993 (age 33)
- Origin: Ibaraki, Osaka, Japan
- Genres: J-pop; Rock
- Occupations: Singer; songwriter
- Instruments: Vocals; guitar
- Years active: 2010 – present
- Labels: laugh out loud! records (2016–2018); Universal Sigma (2019–present)
- Formerly of: MAD CATZ, NMB48, AKB48
- Website: http://yamamotosayaka.jp/

Sayaka Yamamoto (山本 彩, Yamamoto Sayaka; born July 14, 1993) is a Japanese singer-songwriter signed to Universal Sigma. She is a former member of the girl group NMB48, where she served as captain, and a former concurrent member of AKB48. She made her debut as a solo artist in October 2016 with her first studio album "Rainbow" while she was still in NMB48, with her releases regularly placing in the top ten of the Oricon weekly charts since.

== Career ==
=== Pre-2010: Early life and initial debut ===
The youngest of four and influenced by her family's love for music, Sayaka Yamamoto started taking dance and singing classes in 2nd grade. In 5th grade, inspired by Avril Lavigne, she started learning guitar. Yamamoto initially debuted in the band MAD CATZ in 2008 as their lead guitarist. The bassist of the band left in 2009, and the band disbanded altogether by the end of the year.

=== 2010–2012: Debut with NMB48 ===
In September 2010, Sayaka Yamamoto passed auditions for the first generation of NMB48 and was selected to debut in the group along with 25 other girls. They were announced as a group on October 9, 2010, and officially began performing at the NMB48 Theater on January 1, 2011. Yamamoto was also officially announced as captain of NMB48 on this day.

On March 10, 2011, Yamamoto was selected as one of 16 members who would form Team N, of which she was selected to serve as captain alongside her captaincy of the entire group. Team N made their debut at the NMB48 Theater on March 21. In May, Yamamoto and Miyuki Watanabe were the first NMB48 members to be selected as recording and performing members (hereafter referred to as “senbatsu”) for an A-side with the release of AKB48's 21st single "Everyday, Katyusha." Over the next 7 years, she participated in AKB48 A-sides as a senbatsu member for almost her whole tenure as an idol, through their 52nd single "Teacher Teacher."

Also in May, NMB48 revealed their first original song "Seishun no Lap Time" during a theater performance. It was centered by Yamamoto, and was released later as a B-side on the group's first single. On June 9, Yamamoto was the only member of NMB48 to rank in AKB48's 3rd general election, placing 28th with 8,697 votes. On July 20, NMB48 made their major CD debut with their first single "Zetsumetsu Kurokami Shoujo," for which Yamamoto was selected as a senbatsu member. She would go on to be a senbatsu member in all 19 NMB48 A-sides released during her time in the group, and the center for 13 of those singles. On October 19, NMB48 released their second single titled "Oh My God!", for which Yamamoto served as center for the first time with fellow Team N member Nana Yamada.

Yamamoto was given her first solo A-side center on NMB48's third single "Junjou U-19," which was released on February 8, 2012. This was also the first NMB48 single to include a solo song, "Jungle Gym," sung by Yamamoto. On May 9, NMB48 released their fourth single "Nagiichi," centered by Yamamoto and Miyuki Watanabe. On June 6, Yamamoto ranked 18th in AKB48's 4th general election with a total of 23,020 votes and as a result, sang on B-side "Nante Bohemian" as a member of "Undergirls" on AKB48's 27th single "Gingham Check." On August 8, NMB48 released their fifth single "Virginity," featuring Yamamoto as the sole center. On November 7, NMB48 released their 6th single "Kitagawa Kenji," for which Yamamoto served as center with Miyuki Watanabe. On November 21, Yamamoto released her first photobook entitled "Sayagami," which sold over 55,000 units.

=== 2013–2015: Rise in popularity and concurrency with AKB48 ===
On June 8, Yamamoto ranked 14th in AKB48's 5th general election with 51,793 votes. The release of AKB48's 32nd single "Koisuru Fortune Cookie" on August 21 marked the first time Yamamoto entered an AKB48 senbatsu through the election. On June 19, NMB48 released their 7th single "Bokura no Eureka," and on October 2, their 8th single ""Kamonegix." Yamamoto was the sole center for both singles.

On February 24, 2014, it was announced that Yamamoto would hold a concurrent position in AKB48's Team K, coming into effect in May. On March 26, NMB48 released their 8th single "Takane no Ringo," for which Yamamoto again served as a solo center. On June 7, Yamamoto ranked 6th in AKB48's 6th general election with 67,916 votes, marking her first entry into the "Kami 7". As a result, Yamamoto participated as a senbatsu member on AKB48's 37th single "Kokoro no Placard." Yamamoto was also the only NMB48 member to rank in senbatsu that year.

On July 4, a JT-sponsored commercial of Sayaka Yamamoto singing "Hitoiki Tsukinagara" a cappella began airing. Several different arrangements of the song featuring Yamamoto have been made since for subsequent commercials, and it was also later recorded on her first solo album in 2016. In 2014, she also began collaborating with other artists as both a guitarist and a singer on music programs like "FNS Music Festival" and "UTAGE!". In October, her radio program "NMB48 Yamamoto Sayaka no Regular Toretemouta!" started airing.

On February 10, 2015, Yamamoto released her second photobook titled "SY," which sold 42,779 in its first week of sales according to Oricon and topped the Oricon sales charts. The high sales volume prompted a second printing of the photobook. On June 6, Yamamoto ranked 6th in AKB48's 7th general election with 97,866 votes, and participated as a senbatsu member on AKB48's 41st single "Halloween Night," as a result.

On August 18, it was announced that Sayaka Yamamoto would be the center of AKB48's "365nichi no Kamihikouki," which was the theme song for the NHK drama “Asa ga Kita” and was later released as a B-side on AKB48's 42nd single "Kuchibiru ni Be My Baby." This marked the first time she served as a solo center on a full-senbatsu AKB48 track, not including those recorded as NMB48. On October 7, NMB48 released their 13th single "Must be now," with Yamamoto returning as center for a NMB48 A-side.

=== 2016–2017: Solo debut ===
On January 8, 2016, Yamamoto released her third photobook "Minna no Yamamoto Sayaka." On April 18, she began co-hosting the radio show “Appare Yattemasu” on Mondays, a position she would hold for four years. On April 27, NMB48 released their 14th single "Amagami Hime," centered by Yamamoto. This single also included a solo version of the aforementioned "365nichi no Kamihikouki" by Yamamoto. On May 26, she graduated from her concurrent position in AKB48's Team K and returned to solely being a member of NMB48. On June 18, Yamamoto ranked 4th, her highest rank, in AKB48's 8th general election with 110,411 votes, and participated as a senbatsu member on AKB48's 45th's single “LOVE TRIP / Shiawase o Wakenasai" as a result. Prior to the election, she stated that 2016 would be the last year she participated in the event. On August 3, NMB48 released their 15th single "Boku wa Inai," which included a B-side track Yamamoto composed, "Ima Naraba."

On August 24, Sayaka Yamamoto announced she would be releasing her first solo album. It would be produced by Seiji Kameda and include tracks written and composed by her. On October 26, she released her album "Rainbow" and it debuted at 3rd place on the weekly Oricon albums chart. She also embarked on her first solo tour, eponymously named "Rainbow," with five performances in four venues. On December 28, NMB48 released their 16th single "Boku Igai no Dareka," featuring Yamamoto as center. It also included another B-side composed by her, "Kodoku Guitar." On December 31, she ranked 1st place at AKB48's special election during the 67th NHK Kouhaku Uta Gassen with 41,990 votes.

On March 29, 2017, Yamamoto released her essay book, "Subete no Riyuu." In May, she was one of two artists to record and have their version of the Hanshin Tigers' song "Rokko Oroshi" air at the team's home stadium before matches as well as after winning games. On July 7, she was one of the featured artists on "The best covers of DREAMS COME TRUE DoriUta Vol. 1" with her cover of "Nando Demo," which was also later re-released as a B-side on her second solo album. The following day on July 8, she also appeared in her first music festival as a solo artist at DoriUta Fes, hosted by DREAMS COME TRUE.

On October 4, Sayaka Yamamoto released her second solo album "identity," which debuted at 2nd place on the weekly Oricon album charts. It was again produced by Seiji Kameda and seven of the tracks included were written and composed by her. She also held her second tour with 8 performances in 7 venues.

=== 2018–2021: Graduation from NMB48 and continued solo success ===
On April 4, 2018, NMB48 released their 18th single "Yokubomono," for which Yamamoto served as center. In May, Yamamoto appeared in her first official rock festival, METROCK. On July 30, Sayaka Yamamoto announced during NMB48 LIVE TOUR 2018 in Summer that she would be graduating from NMB48. On October 17, NMB48 released their 19th single "Boku Datte Naichau yo," Yamamoto's final single with the group. In addition to her graduation solo song and the two tracks centered by her, the single also includes her composition "Yume wa Nigenai" as another B-side. On October 27, 2018, her graduation concert titled "SAYAKA SONIC~Sayaka, Sasayaka, Sayonara, Sayaka~" was held at Expo '70 Commemorative Park, marking NMB48's first outdoor concert and their largest concert to date with over 30,000 people in attendance. She officially graduated from NMB48 on November 4, 2018, with graduation performances on November 3 and 4 at the NMB48 Theater.

On January 1, 2019, Sayaka Yamamoto announced her third tour “I’m ready,” consisting of 27 performances in 24 venues, and the opening of her fan clubs SYC and SYC Mobile on January 7. On February 17, she announced her transfer to Universal Music Japan as her record company, with Universal Sigma as her label. In 2019, she appeared in more rock festivals, including METROCK, ROCK IN JAPAN, and MONSTER BaSH.

On April 17, Sayaka Yamamoto released her first solo single "Ichirinsou." In August, her radio show "Yamamoto Sayaka Kakeru" began airing. On September 4, Yamamoto released her second single "Toge." On September 17, Yamamoto announced via her YouTube channel that her third single "Tsuioku no Hikari" would be released on November 20, with her third album α (Alpha) following on December 25.

In February 2020, she embarked on her fourth tour and held 3 performances before ultimately canceling the rest of the tour due to the COVID-19 pandemic. She held a final no-audience performance via livestream on August 28. On September 17, Yamamoto pre-released “Ai Nante Iranai,” which served as a CM song for a MOS Burger commercial, in which she also starred. On October 28, Yamamoto released her fourth solo single "Zero Universe," the ending song for TV Tokyo's Anoko no Yume o Mitan desu. Also in October, she started hosting the radio show "SPARK" on Mondays. In December, her song "Boku wa Omocha" for NHK's Minna no Uta began airing on the program.

On February 24, 2021, Sayaka Yamamoto released her fifth single "Dramatic ni Kanpai," which was the theme song for Tokai TV/Fuji TV's "Sono Onna, Jiruba." In May, her radio show "HEART STUDIO" began airing. On July 14, Sayaka Yamamoto released her first digital single "yonder," which was the CM song for Yamagata Nissan Group's 60th Anniversary commercial. On August 25, Yamamoto surprise released her second digital single "Don't hold me back." In September, she embarked on her fifth nationwide tour, titled "re," with 12 performances scheduled in 11 venues. On October 27, Yamamoto released her third digital single "Aimatte." On November 26, it was announced she would be going on hiatus, retroactively since November 19, due to issues with her thyroid and underwent treatment. On December 1, she was a featured artist on Night Tempo's "I Don't Wanna" from his major debut album “Ladies in the City.”

=== 2022–present: Return from hiatus and expansion of activities ===
On April 1, 2022, Sayaka Yamamoto was announced as one of the singers featured on the soundtrack for the 2022-released AFKRPG “Memento Mori." A full version of her song “Lament” was released on the mobile game's associated YouTube channel on April 18.

On July 14, Yamamoto announced her return from hiatus, with her condition in remission. On August 15, she held a special livestreamed performance to mark her return, and on October 16, she performed at the music festival Chillin' Vibes, her first in-person live event since ending her hiatus.

On November 11, the digital album ELLEGARDEN TRIBUTE was released, with Yamamoto as one of the featuring artists with her rendition of "Kaze no Hi." She wrapped up 2022 with solo concerts in Tokyo and Osaka on December 27 and 29 respectively.

On February 13, 2023, Yamamoto announced the establishment of her own private office, SYCompany, following the end of her management contract with her previous agency Showtitle at the end of 2022. Also in February, she held a fan club-exclusive Billboard Live tour, and participated in tribute concerts for Miyuki Nakajima. From the three songs she covered, her rendition of "Takaga Ai" was later released as a part of the live album "Utaenishi -Nakajima Miyuki RESPECT LIVE 2023-."

Yamamoto released her fourth studio album “&” on May 17 and embarked on another eponymous nationwide tour in June and July 2023. A well-known avid Hanshin Tigers fan, the singer notably performed the Japanese national anthem before Game 3 of the 2023 Japan Series on October 31 at Koshien Stadium.

2024 kicked off with another fan club-exclusive Billboard live tour, 3 months of consecutive releases—beginning with electro-swing track “Nocturnal” on February 28—, and her hall tour "RGB."

On March 27, Yamamoto notably released "Tweedia (Blue Star)," the ending song for the anime "An Archdemon's Dilemma: How to Love Your Elf Bride." On April 24, the singer released her third digital single of the year, “Lingering Traces,” a second track for AFKRPG “Memento Mori." She held her first tour outside Japan in May and June. On August 23, Yamamoto launched her own jewelry brand, "flair et mot." Beginning September 4, the singer embarked on her first nationwide acoustic tour “Organic.”

On October 30, Yamamoto digitally released “Seagull,” the third ending song for the anime "Shinkalion: Change the World." In November, she held her first "Battle of the Bands"-style tour, with each stop featuring a different co-headling artist: Abe Mao, ACIDMAN, and Scandal. On December 25, Yamamoto released her first EP "U TA CARTE."

Beginning January 2025, the singer will hold two more tours back to back, one nationwide and another her now annual Billboard live tour.

== Musicality and influences ==
Since going solo, Sayaka Yamamoto composes and writes all her releases. The majority of her first two albums, released whilst she was still active in NMB48, consist of self-compositions as well. In addition to her own music, she also has composed for her former group, and provided background vocals for songs she participated in while in NMB48 and AKB48. While her roots are in rock music, Yamamoto's own work encompasses a wide spectrum and is not limited to a specific genre nor defined by a particular label, as noted by columnists. In her own words, she wants her music “to go beyond genres…so [she doesn’t] think about making a particular type of music” and creates what she wants to at the time. Yamamoto often credits Takeshi Hosomi, Avril Lavigne, and yui as her biggest musical inspirations and people she admires, among others. Yamamoto also frequently collaborates with Takahiro Konagawa, who serves as bandleader of her backing band Team SY in addition to producing and arranging many of her songs. Other main collaborators and backing band members include Koji Kusakari, Shota Okuno, SATOKO, asami, and Ayasa. As a guitarist, Yamamoto currently uses a Gibson Custom True Historic '59 Les Paul and a Fender American Professional II Stratocaster as her main electric guitars, and a Martin D-28, a Gibson Custom Shop 1957 SJ-200, and a Martin D-15 Streetmaster as her main acoustic guitars.

== Discography ==
=== Albums ===
List of solo albums, with selected details and chart positions
Title	Details	JPN	JPN Hot	Notes
Rainbow	Released: October 26, 2016; Label: laugh out loud!; Formats: CD, CD+DVD	3	—	
Identity	Released: October 4, 2017; Label: laugh out loud!; Formats: CD, CD+DVD	2	—	"Let's go crazy" was theme song for AbemaTV's "Futari Monologue"
α	Released: December 25, 2019; Label: Universal Sigma; Formats: CD, CD+DVD	5	5	"True Blue" was theme song for the 37th All-Japan Collegiate Women's Ekiden Championship and the 5th Saitama International Marathon
&	Released: May 17, 2023; Label: Universal Sigma; Formats: CD, CD+DVD	10	9	
Narrative	Released: October 28, 2026; Label: Universal Sigma; Formats: CD	18	—	

=== Extended plays ===
List of solo extended plays, with selected details and chart positions
Title	Details	JPN
U Ta Carte	Released: December 25, 2024; Label: Universal Sigma; Formats: CD	14

=== Singles ===
==== As lead artist ====
List of solo single albums, with selected details and chart positions
Title	Details	JPN	JPN Hot	Notes
"Ichirinsou" (イチリンソウ)	Released: April 17, 2019; Label: Universal Sigma; Formats: CD, CD+DVD	3	—	
"Toge" (棘, Thorn)	Released: September 4, 2019; Label: Universal Sigma; Formats: CD, CD+DVD	6	18	"feel the night" was ending song for J-WAVE's "GYAO! CLUB INTIMATE"
"Tsuioku no Hikari" (追憶の光, Light of Recollection)	Released: November 20, 2019; Label: Universal Sigma; Formats: CD, CD+DVD	8	10	"stay free" was CM song for Sports Depo Alpen's "adidas Black collection" commercial
"Zero Universe" (ゼロ ユニバース)	Released: October 28, 2020; Label: Universal Sigma; Formats: CD, CD+DVD	3	36	"Zero Universe" was ending song for TV Tokyo's "Anoko no Yume o Mitan desu" "Ai Nante Iranai" was CM song for MOS Burger commercial "against" was theme song for Nippon Life's "Nissay Youth Cheering Project"
"Dramatic ni Kanpai" (ドラマチックに乾杯, Dramatically Cheers)	Released: February 24, 2021; Label: Universal Sigma; Formats: CD, CD+DVD	10	67	"Dramatic ni Kanpai" was theme song for Tokai TV/Fuji TV's "Sono Onna, Jiruba" "Boku wa Omocha" was Dec 2020-Jan 2021 song for NHK's "Minna no Uta"

==== Digital singles ====
- "yonder" (2021)
- "Don't hold me back" (2021)
- "Aimatte." (あいまって。) (2021)
- "Nocturnal" (2024)
- "Tweedia (Blue Star)" (ブルースター) (2024)
- "Seagull" (2024)
- "Setsuna" (刹夏) (2025)

==== As featured artist ====
- "Nando Demo," Various Artists (2017, The best covers of DREAMS COME TRUE DoriUta Vol. 1)
- "Ayamachi," Junichi Inagaki (2017, HARVEST)
- "I Don't Wanna," Night Tempo (2021, Ladies in the City)
- "Kaze no Hi," Various Artists (2022, ELLEGARDEN TRIBUTE)
- "Takaga Ai," Various Artists (2024, Utaenishi -Nakajima Miyuki RESPECT LIVE 2023-)

=== Releases with 48 Group ===
Singles with NMB48

Year	No.	Title	Role	Participating B-sides	Notes
2011	1	"Zetsumetsu Kurokami Shōjo"	A-side, Shirogumi, 1st Generation	"Seishun no Lap Time" (Center), "Boku ga Maketa Natsu" with Shirogumi (Center), and "Mikazuki no Senaka."	Debut with NMB48.
2011	2	"Oh My God!"	A-side (Center), Shirogumi, NMB Seven	"Boku wa Matteru," "Kesshou" with Shirogumi, and "Uso no Tenbin" with NMB Seven.	Centered all tracks she participated in.
2012	3	"Junjō U-19"	A-side (Center), Shirogumi, NMB Seven, Solo	"Doryoku no Shizuku" with Shirogumi, "Renai no Speed" with NMB Seven, and solo track "Jungle Gym."	Centered all tracks she participated in.
2012	4	"Nagiichi"	A-side (Center), Shirogumi, NMB Seven	"Saigo no Catharsis" with Shirogumi and "Hatsukoi no Yukue to Play Ball" with NMB Seven.	Centered all tracks she participated in.
2012	5	"Virginity"	A-side (Center), Shirogumi	"Mōsō Girlfriend," as well as "Bokura no Regatta" with Shirogumi (Center).	
2012	6	"Kitagawa Kenji"	A-side (Center), Shirogumi	"In-Goal," as well as "Hoshizora no Caravan" with Shirogumi.	Centered all tracks she participated in.
2013	7	"Bokura no Eureka"	A-side (Center), Shirogumi	"Todokekana Soude Todoku Mono," as well as "Okuba" as Shirogumi.	She is the subject of the song "Sayanee" on the single. Centered all tracks she participated in.
2013	8	"Kamonegix"	A-side (Center), Shirogumi	"Doshaburi no Seishun no Naka de" as Shirogumi.	Centered all tracks she participated in.
2014	9	"Takane no Ringo"	A-side (Center), Shirogumi	"Prom no Koibito" as Shirogumi.	Centered all tracks she participated in.
2014	10	"Rashikunai"	A-side, Team N	"Tomodachi" with Nana Yamada and "Kyusen Kyotei" as Team N (Center).	
2015	11	"Don't look back!"	A-side, 1st Generation, Team N	"Sotsugyō Ryokō" as NMB48's 1st generation and "Renai Petenshi" as Team N (Center).	
2015	12	"Durian Shōnen"	A-side, Team N	"Inochi no Heso" as Team N (Center).	
2015	13	"Must be now"	A-side (Center), Team N, Orera	"Yume ni Iro ga nai riyū" as Team N (Center) and "Orera to wa" with Orera.	
2016	14	"Amagami Hime"	A-side (Center), Team N	Solo track "365 Nichi no Kamihikōki," "Hakanai Monogatari" as Team N, and "Dōtonbori yo, Naka Sete Kure!" (Center).	
2016	15	"Boku wa Inai"	A-side, Team N	"Ima Naraba" as SayaMilky and "Sora Kara Ai ga Futte Kuru" as Team N.	Composed "Ima Naraba."
2016	16	"Boku Igai no Dareka"	A-side (Center), Team N	"Kodoku Guitar" as Team N.	Composed "Kodoku Guitar."
2017	17	"Warota People"	A-side, Team N	"Doko ka de Kiss wo" as Team N (Center).	
2018	18	"Yokubomono"	A-side (Center), Team N	"Hankyū Densha" as Team N.	Centered all tracks she participated in.
2018	19	"Boku Datte naichau yo"	A-side (Center), Team N	"Usotsuki Machine" as Team N and solo track "Wasurete Hoshii" (her graduation song).	Last single to participate. Centered all tracks she participated in. Composed "Yume wa Nigenai."

Albums with NMB48

Teppen Tottande!

- "Teppen Tottande!" (Center)
- "12/31" (Center)
- "Lily" / Team N (Center)
- "Dazai Osamu wo Yonda Ka?" (Center)

Sekai no Chuushin wa Osaka ya ~Namba Jichiku~

- "Ibiza Girl" (Center)
- ""Seito Techo no Shashin wa Ki ni Haittenai" no Hoshoku" (Center)
- "Densha wo Oriru" / Team N (Center)
- "Dakishimetai Kedo" / Solo

Namba Ai ~Ima Omou Koto~

- "Masaka Singapore"
- "Namba Ai"

Singles with AKB48

Year	No.	Title	Role	Notes
2011	21	"Everyday, Katyusha"	A-side	First AKB48 single, representing NMB48.
2011	22	"Flying Get"	Undergirls, Yasai Sisters	Ranked 28th in 2011 General Election. Did not sing on title track; sang on "Dakishimecha Ikenai." Also sang on "Yasai Uranai."
2011	23	"Kaze wa Fuiteiru"	A-side	
2011	24	"Ue kara Mariko"	B-side	Did not sing on title track; lineup was determined by rock-paper-scissors tournament; Sang on "Noël no Yoru."
2012	25	"Give Me Five!"	A-side ("Baby Blossom")	Sang as chorus in Baby Blossom.
2012	26	"Manatsu no Sounds Good!"	A-side	Also sang on "Gugutasu no Sora"; lineup was determined by popularity of AKB48 group members on Google+.
2012	27	"Gingham Check"	Undergirls	Ranked 18th in 2012 General Election. Did not sing on title track; sang on "Nante Bohemian".
2012	28	"UZA"	A-side	
2012	29	"Eien Pressure"	B-side (NMB48)	Did not sing on title track; lineup was determined by rock-paper-scissors tournament. Sang on and centered "HA!" as part of NMB48.
2013	30	"So Long!"	A-side	
2013	31	"Sayonara Crawl"	A-side	
2013	32	"Koi Suru Fortune Cookie"	A-side	Ranked 14th in 2013 General Election. Sang on title track.
2013	33	"Heart Electric"	A-side	Sang on title track with English name "Rosanna"
2013	34	"Suzukake no Ki no Michi de "Kimi no Hohoemi o Yume ni Miru" to Itte Shimattara Bokutachi no Kankei wa Dō Kawatte Shimau no ka, Bokunari ni Nan-nichi ka Kangaeta Ue de no Yaya Kihazukashii Ketsuron no Yō na Mono"	B-side, NMB48	Did not sing on title track; lineup was determined by rock-paper-scissors tournament. Sang on "Kimi to Deatte Boku wa Kawatta" as part of NMB48 and "Mosh & Dive."
2014	35	"Mae Shika Mukanee"	A-side	
2014	36	"Labrador Retriever"	A-side, Team K	Also sang on and centered "Itoshiki Rival" as part of Team K
2014	37	"Kokoro no Placard"	A-side	Ranked 6th in 2014 General Election. Sang on title track.
2014	38	"Kibouteki Refrain"	A-side, Team K	Also sang on and centered "Hajimete no Drive" as Team K.
2015	39	"Green Flash"	A-side, NMB48	Also raps in this song with Minami Takahashi. Also sang on and centered "Punkish" as part of NMB48, and "Majisuka Fight"
2015	40	"Bokutachi wa Tatakawanai"	A-side	Also sang on "Kimi no Dai Ni Sho"
2015	41	"Halloween Night"	A-side	Ranked 6th in 2015 General Election. Sang on title track. Also sang on "Ippome Ondo," "Yankee Machine Gun," and "Gunzou."
2015	42	"Kuchibiru ni Be My Baby"	A-side, Team K, Renacchi Senbatsu	Also sang on and centered "365 Nichi no Kamihikōki," and sang on "Oneesan no Hitorigoto as Team K, "Madonna no Sentaku," and "Senaka Kotoba."
2016	43	"Kimi wa Melody"	A-side, NMB48	Marked as the 10th Anniversary Single. Also sang on and centered "Shigamitsuita Seishun" as part of NMB48.
2016	44	"Tsubasa wa Iranai"	A-side, Team K	Last single as AKB48 concurrent member. Also sang on "Aishū no Trumpeter."
2016	45	"LOVE TRIP / Shiawase o Wakenasai"	A-side	Ranked 4th in 2016 General Election. Sang on title track. Also sang on and centered "Hikari to Kage no Hibi" with Yui Yokoyama.
2016	46	"High Tension"	A-side	
2017	47	"Shoot Sign"	A-side, NMB48	Also sang on "Mayonaka no Tsuyogari" as part of NMB48.
2017	48	"Negaigoto no Mochigusare"	A-side	Also sang on and centered "Anogoro no Gohyaku Yen Dama."
2017	50	"11gatsu no Anklet"	A-side, Dance Senbatsu, Vocal Senbatsu	Also sang on and centered "Yaban na Kyūai," and sang on "Yosōgai no Story."
2018	51	"Jabaja"	A-side, NMB48	Also sang on "Hetawōtsu" as part of NMB48.
2018	52	"Teacher Teacher"	A-side	Last AKB48 single to participate.
2021	58	"Nemohamo Rumor"	B-side (as graduated member)	Sang on “Hanarete Ite mo” as a graduated member; it was originally released as a digital charity single on June 22, 2020, in light of the COVID-19 pandemic.

Albums with AKB48

Koko ni Ita Koto

- "Koko ni Ita Koto"

1830m

- "Aozora yo Sabishikunai Ka?"

Tsugi no Ashiato

- "10 Krone to Pan" (Center)

Koko ga Rhodes da, Koko de Tobe!

- "Ai no Sonzai"
- "Conveyor" / Team K
- "Ai to Kanashimi no Jisa" / Solo

0 to 1 no Aida

- "Ai no Shisha" / Team K
- "LOVE ASH" / Duet with Minami Takahashi

Thumbnail

- "Ayamachi" / Duet with Junichi Inagaki

Bokutachi wa, Ano Hi no Yoake o Shitteiru

- "Kutsuhimo no Musubikata"
- "Kusaimono Darake" (Center)

Stage Units with NMB48 and AKB48

NMB48 Team N 1st Stage "Dareka no Tame ni" (誰かのために)

- "Bird"
- "Seifuku ga Jama o Suru" (制服が邪魔をする)

NMB48 Team N 2nd Stage "Seishun Girls" (青春ガールズ)

- "Blue rose"
- "Fushidara na Natsu" (ふしだらな夏)

NMB48 Team N 3rd Stage "Koko ni Datte Tenshi wa Iru" (ここにだって天使はいる)

- "Yume no Dead Body" (夢のdead body) / Solo
- "Hajimete no Hoshi" (初めての星)
- "100nen Saki Demo" (100年先でも)

NMB48 Team N 3rd Stage Revival "Koko ni Datte Tenshi wa Iru" (ここにだって天使はいる)

- "Yume no Dead Body" (夢のdead body) / Solo
- "Hajimete no Hoshi" (初めての星)
- "100nen Saki Demo" (100年先でも)

AKB48 Team K 6th Stage Revival "RESET"

- "Seifuku Resistance" (制服レジスタンス)

AKB48 Team K 4th Stage Revival "Saishū Bell ga Naru" (最終ベルが鳴る)

- "Return Match" (リターンマッチ)

NMB48 Team N 4th Stage "Mokugekisha" (目撃者)

- 10 Krone to Pan (10クローネとパン)

== Live performances ==
=== Concert tours ===
- Yamamoto Sayaka LIVE TOUR 2016 ~Rainbow~
- Yamamoto Sayaka LIVE TOUR 2017 ~identity~
- Yamamoto Sayaka LIVE TOUR 2019 ~I'm ready~
- Yamamoto Sayaka LIVE TOUR 2020 ~α~
- SAYAKA YAMAMOTO LIVE TOUR 2021 ~re~
- SAYAKA YAMAMOTO LIVE TOUR 2023 -&-
- Sayaka Yamamoto Hall Tour 2024 -RGB-
- Sayaka Yamamoto Acoustic Tour 2024 "Organic"
- Yamamoto Sayaka x Live Natalie Zepp TOUR "SYnergy"
- SAYAKA YAMAMOTO NO MAKE TOUR 2025
- Sayaka Yamamoto Hall Tour 2025-26 "home away from home"

=== Other concerts ===
- AbemaTV 1st ANNIVERSARY LIVE (2017)
- MTV LIVE PREMIUM: SAYAKA YAMAMOTO (2019)
- SAYAKA YAMAMOTO LIVE 2022 "now" (2 performances)
- Nakajima Miyuki RESPECT LIVE 2023 Utaenishi (2 performances)
- Live Natalie " Yamamoto Sayaka × Polkadot Stingray" (2025)
- Kazemachi Poetic 2025
- Memento Mori 1st Live ~The Singing of Laments~ (2025)

=== Fan club-exclusive concerts ===
- Sayaka Yamamoto Celebration 2019
- Congregation 2019
- Sayaka Yamamoto Celebration 2020 (livestream only)
- CUE 2021
- Sayaka Yamamoto Celebration 2021 in Tokyo and Osaka
- Sayaka Yamamoto Cure 2023 -Billboard Live Tour-
- Sayaka Yamamoto Cure 2024 -Billboard Live Tour-
- Sayaka Yamamoto Cure 2025 -Billboard Live Tour-
- SY Cafe POP-UP (2025)

=== Overseas concerts ===
- Sayaka Yamamoto Asia Tour 2024 - 彩 -

== Filmography ==
=== Radio ===
- NMB48 Gakuen (April 9, 2011 – September 28, 2013, ABC Radio)
- NMB48 Yamamoto Sayaka no Regular Toretemouta! (October 2, 2014 – March 27, 2016, Nippon Cultural Broadcasting)
- Appare Yattemasu!, Monday (April 18, 2016 – April 6, 2020, MBS Radio)
- Yamamoto Sayaka Kakeru (August 10, 2019 – March 27, 2021, CROSS FM)
- SPARK (October 6, 2020 – December 27, 2021, J-WAVE)
- HEART STUDIO (May 2, 2021 – December 26, 2021, FM802)

=== Television ===
==== Variety shows ====
- Wakeari! Red Zone (October 4, 2013 – 2017, Yomiuri TV)
- NMB48 Yamamoto Sayaka's M-Nee ~Music Onee-San~ (November 30, 2013 – 2015, Space Shower TV Plus)
- Viking (April 4, 2014 – March 31, 2017, Fuji TV)
- UTAGE! (May 19, 2014 – August 22, 2019, TBS)
- Chichin Puipui (June 7, 2018 – February 14, 2019, MBS TV)
- Toraban (March 2016 – 2018, Asahi Broadcasting)
- Mint! (April 2019 – March 2020, MBS TV)
- AK Variety (January 2024 – present)
- APOLLO AMATEUR NIGHT JAPAN 24-25 (October 2024 – March 2025, Fuji TV)

==== Dramas ====
- Majisuka Gakuen 4 (2015, Nippon TV) as Antonio
- Majisuka Gakuen 5 (2015, Nippon TV) as Antonio
- AKB Horror Night: Adrenaline's Night Ep.3 - Product Storage (2015, TV Asahi) as Anna
- Rekishi Hiwa Historia Ep. 250 - An Inner Palace Tale of Love and Sadness (2016, NHK) as Hiroko Konoe
- AKB Love Night: Love Factory Ep.11 - Love Letters of the Past (2016, TV Asahi) as Mizuki Kyōno
- Hibana (2016, Netflix)
- Cabasuka Gakuen (2016, Nippon TV) as Antonio
- Ueki Hitoshi to Nobosemon Ep. 5 (2017, NHK) as Mari Sono

=== Film ===
- NMB48 Geinin! The Movie Owarai Seishun Girls! (2013)
- NMB48 Geinin! The Movie Returns Sotsugyō! Owarai Seishun Girls!! Aratanaru Tabidachi (2014)

=== Documentary ===
- To Everest for the 5th Time ~Kuriki Nobukazu's Challenge From Rock Bottom~ (2016, NHK), Narrator
- Ikimonogakari Yoshiki Mizuno's Dialogue on Aku Yū (2017, NHK BS Premium)
- Yamamoto Sayaka Graduation Special ~8 Years with NMB48~ (2018, BS SKY PerfecTV!)
- ZARD Forever: How Sakai Izumi's Songs Came to Life (2019, NHK BS Premium), Narrator
- Yamamoto Sayaka Time Triangle (2019, Fuji TV TWO)

== Bibliography ==
=== Magazines ===
- Smart, Takarajimasha 1995-, (October 2012 – June 2025)
- Tarzan, MAGAZINE HOUSE 1986-, (August 20, 2015 – July 6, 2017)
- Skream!, GEKI-ROCK ENTERTAINMENT, (September 2018 – November 2019)

=== Essay Books ===
- Subete no Riyuu (March 29, 2017, Gentosha) ISBN 9784344030879

=== Photobooks ===
- Saya Gami (November 21, 2012, Shueisha) ISBN 9784087806656
- SY (February 10, 2015, Yoshimoto Books) ISBN 9784847047275
- Minna no Yamamoto Sayaka (January 8, 2016, Yoshimoto Books) ISBN 9784847048159
