= Takane no Ringo =

Single by NMB48
- Released: March 26, 2014 (Japan)
- Genre: J-pop

NMB48 singles chronology
"Kamonegikkusu" (2013)	"Takane no Ringo" (2014)	"Rashikunai" (2014)

"Takane no Ringo" (高嶺の林檎) is the 9th single by NMB48. It was released on March 26, 2014. It debuted in number one on the weekly Oricon Singles Chart. It was the third best-selling single in March and it was the 9th best-selling single of the year, as of June 18. It has sold a total of 451,335 copies. It reached number one on the Billboard Japan Hot 100. It was the 15th best-selling single of the year in Japan, with 451,335 copies.

== Background ==
This single will be released in 4 versions: Type A, Type B, Type C and Theater Edition. The title song was first performed during NMB48 Team N's stage on March 7, 2014. This single includes all members except Rena Shimada, who was graduating, and Tsubasa Yamauchi who was on a hiatus due to her injury. This is Mayu Ogasawara's last single.

== Track list ==
=== TYPE-A ===
CD
No.	Title	Artist(s)	Length
1.	"Takane no Ringo" (高嶺の林檎)
2.	"Isshukan, Zenbu ga Getsuyoubi Naraiinoni..." (一週間、全部が月曜日ならいいのに…)	Kenkyuusei
3.	"Prom no Koibito" (プロムの恋人)	Shirogumi
4.	"Takane no Ringo (Off vocal)"
5.	"Isshukan, Zenbu ga Getsuyoubi Naraiinoni... (Off vocal)"
6.	"Prom no Koibito (Off vocal)"

DVD
No.	Title	Length
1.	"Takane no Ringo (Music Video)"
2.	"Takane no Ringo (Music Video Dance Version)"
3.	"Prom no Koibito (Music Video)"
4.	"Bonus footage "Oshaberigumi" <First part>"

=== TYPE-B ===
CD
No.	Title	Artist(s)	Length
1.	"Takane no Ringo" (高嶺の林檎)
2.	"Isshukan, Zenbu ga Getsuyoubi Naraiinoni..." (一週間、全部が月曜日ならいいのに…)
3.	"Mizukiri" (水切り)	Akagumi
4.	"Takane no Ringo (Off vocal)"
5.	"Isshukan, Zenbu ga Getsuyoubi Naraiinoni... (Off vocal)"
6.	"Mizukiri (Off vocal)"

DVD
No.	Title	Length
1.	"Takane no Ringo (Music Video)"
2.	"Takane no Ringo (Music Video Dance Version)"
3.	"Mizukiri (Music Video)"
4.	"Bonus footage "Oshaberigumi" <Last part>"

=== TYPE-C ===
CD
No.	Title	Artist(s)	Length
1.	"Takane no Ringo" (高嶺の林檎)
2.	"Isshukan, Zenbu ga Getsuyoubi Naraiinoni..." (山へ行こう)
3.	"Yama e Ikou" (プロムの恋人)	Namba Teppoudai Sono Go
4.	"Takane no Ringo (Off vocal)"
5.	"Isshukan, Zenbu ga Getsuyoubi Naraiinoni... (Off vocal)"
6.	"Yama e Ikou (Off vocal)"

DVD
No.	Title	Length
1.	"Takane no Ringo (Music Video)"
2.	"Takane no Ringo (Music Video Dance Version)"
3.	"Yama e Ikou (Music Video)"
4.	"NMB48 feat. Yoshimoto Shin Kigeki Vol.8"

=== Theater Edition ===
CD
No.	Title	Artist(s)	Length
1.	"Takane no Ringo" (高嶺の林檎)
2.	"Prom no Koibito" (プロムの恋人)	Shirogumi
3.	"Mizukiri" (水切り)	Akagumi
4.	"Kasa wa Iranai" (傘はいらない)	Undergirls
5.	"Takane no Ringo (Off vocal)"
6.	"Prom no Koibito (Off vocal)"
7.	"Mizukiri (Off vocal)"
8.	"Kasa wa Iranai (Off vocal)"

== Members ==
=== Takane no Ringo ===
Team N: Mayu Ogasawara, Riho Kotani, Kei Jonishi, Miori Ichikawa, Miru Shiroma, Sayaka Yamamoto, Akari Yoshida, Miyuki Watanabe
Team M: Sae Murase, Yui Takano, Airi Tanigawa, Fuuko Yagura, Nana Yamada
Team BII: Yūka Kato, Shu Yabushita
Kenkyuusei: Nagisa Shibuya

=== Isshukan, Zenbu ga Getsuyoubi nara ii no ni... ===
Kenkyuusei: Natsuko Akashi, Yuumi Ishida, Mizuki Uno, Mai Odan, Chihiro Kawakami, Nagisa Shibuya, Momoka Shimazaki, Eriko Jo, Riko Takayama, Honoka Terui, Hiromi Nakagawa, Reina Nakano, Rurina Nishizawa, Chiho Matsuoka, Megumi Matsumura, Arisa Miura, Ayaka Morita, Rina Yamao

=== Prom no Koibito ===
Team N: Kanako Kadowaki, Rika Kishino, Haruna Kinoshita, Sayaka Yamamoto
Team M: Ayaka Okita, Ayaka Murakami, Fuuko Yagura, Natsumi Yamagishi
Team BII: Akari Ishizuka, Anna Ijiri, Emika Kamieda
Kenkyuusei: Mai Odan

=== Mizukiri ===
Team N: Rina Kondo, Yuuki Yamaguchi, Miyuki Watanabe
Team M: Rena Kawakami, Momoka Kinoshita, Mao Mita, Nana Yamada, Keira Yogi
Team BII: Konomi Kusaka, Rina Kushiro
Kenkyuusei: Arisa Miura, Rina Yamao

=== Yama e Ikou ===
Team N: Miru Shiroma, Aika Nishimura, Momoka Hayashi
Team BII: Hono Akazawa, Yuuri Ota, Kanako Muro
Kenkyuusei: Chihiro Kawakami, Reina Nakano

=== Kasa wa Iranai ===
Team N: Narumi Koga
Team M: Yuki Azuma, Rena Shimada
Team BII: Mirei Ueda, Hazuki Kurokawa, Saki Kono, Rikako Kobayashi, Tsubasa Yamauchi
Kenkyuusei: Natsuko Akashi, Yuumi Ishida, Mizuki Uno, Momoka Shimazaki, Eriko Jo, Riko Takayama, Honoka Terui, Hiromi Nakagawa, Rurina Nishizawa, Chiho Matsuoka, Megumi Matsumura, Ayaka Morita
