= Yūka Kato =

Japanese actress

Yūka Kato 加藤 夕夏
- Also known as: Uka
- Born: 1 August 1997 (age 29)
- Origin: Osaka Prefecture, Japan
- Occupations: artist , actor
- Years active: 2012 - present
- Label: KYORAKU Yoshimoto Holdings
- Formerly of: NMB48 3rd generation trainee → Team BII → Team N → Team M → Team BII → Team N, Dansable

Yūka Katō (加藤 夕夏, Kato Yūka; born 1 August 1997 in Osaka Prefecture) is a Japanese actress and former idol. She is a former member of the Japanese idol girl group NMB48 as part of Team N.

== Biography ==
Kato passed NMB48's 3rd generation auditions in December 2011. Her debut was on February 18, 2012. In October 2012, she was selected to Team BII.

In February 2014, during AKB48's Group Shuffle, Kato was transferred to Team N.

In June 2015, at the AKB48 41st Senbatsu Sousenkyo, Kato ranked for the first time at #59, putting her into Future Girls.

In October 2016, during NMB48’s 6th Anniversary Live, Kato was transferred to Team M, becoming the first NMB48 member to have been into three teams.

In AKB48’s 49th Single Senbatsu Sousenkyo held in June 18th 2017, Kato ranked 33rd Place and became center of Next Girls.

In AKB48’s 53rd Sekai Senbatsu Sousenkyo held in June 2018, Kato ranked 86th, placing her into The 10th AKB48 World Senbatsu Sousenkyo Kinen Waku. In the same year, she joined the South Korean girl group idol survival show Produce 48.

In NMB48 Daisokaku 2019, Kato was transferred back to Team BII.

In 2021, Kato was transferred from Team BII to Promoted Members when teams were disbanded.

One year later (2022), NMB48 reformed teams and Kato was appointed member of Team N.

On May 2, 2023, Kato announced her graduation from NMB48, as well as her intent to pursue an acting career.

== Discography ==
=== NMB48 singles ===
Year	No.	Title	Role	Notes
2012	4	"Nagiichi"	B-side	Sang on "Rifujin Ball"
2012	5	"Virginity (song)"	A-side	First A-side. Also sang on "Mōsō Girlfriend" and "Sunahama de Pistol"
2012	6	"Kitagawa Kenji"	A-side	Also sang on "Fuyushougun no Regret"
2013	7	"Bokura no Eureka"	A-side	
2013	8	"Kamonegix"	A-side	
2014	9	"Takane no Ringo"	A-side	
2014	10	"Rashikunai"	A-side	Also sang on "Kyusen Kyotei" as Team N.
2015	11	"Don't look back!"	A-side	

=== AKB48 singles ===
Year	No.	Title	Role	Notes	
2012	27	"Gingham Check"	B-side	Sang on "Ano Hi no Fuurin"	
2012	29	"Eien Pressure"	B-side	Sang on "HA!"	
2012	2013	34	"Suzukake no Ki no Michi de "Kimi no Hohoemi o Yume ni Miru" to Itte Shimattara Bokutachi no Kankei wa Dō Kawatte Shimau no ka, Bokunari ni Nan-nichi ka Kangaeta Ue de no Yaya Kihazukashii Ketsuron no Yō na Mono"	B-side	Sang on "Kimi to Deatte Boku wa Kawatta"
2015	39	"Green Flash"	B-side	Sang on "Punkish"	

== Appearances ==
=== Stage Units ===
NMB48 Kenkyuusei Stage "Aitakatta"

1. "Nageki no Figure"
2. "Nagisa no CHERRY"
3. "Senaka Kara Dakishimete"
4. "Rio no Kakumei"

Team BII 1st Stage "Aitakatta"

1. "Nageki no Figure"
2. "Koi no PLAN"
3. "Senaka Kara Dakishimete"
4. "Rio no Kakumei"

Team BII 2nd Stage "Tadaima Renaichuu"

1. "Faint"

Team N 3rd Stage "Koko ni Datte Tenshi wa Iru" (Revival)

1. "Nando mo Nerae!"
2. "Hajimete no Hoshi"
3. "100nen Saki Demo"
