= Miori =

- Gender: Female

Origin
- Origin: Japanese
- Meaning: Different meanings depending on the kanji used

Miori (written: 美織) is a feminine Japanese given name. Notable people with the name include:

- Miori Ichikawa (市川 美織; born 1994), Japanese idol and singer
- Miori Takimoto (瀧本 美織; born 1991), Japanese actress and singer
