= Mae shika Mukanee =

2014 single by AKB48

- Type-A Limited Edition Cover

Single by AKB48

from the album Koko ga Rhodes da, Koko de Tobe!
- Released: February 26, 2014
- Genre: J-pop
- Length: 4:17
- Label: You, Be Cool! / King
- Songwriter: Yasushi Akimoto (lyrics)
- Producer: Yasushi Akimoto

AKB48 singles chronology
"Suzukake no Ki no Michi de...Yaya Kihazukashii Ketsuron no Yō na Mono" (2013)	"Mae shika Mukanee" (2014)	"Labrador Retriever" (2014)

Music video
- AKB48 "Mae shika Mukanee" on YouTube

"Mae shika Mukanee" (前しか向かねえ; "I Only Look Forward") is the 35th single by the Japanese idol girl group AKB48. It was released in Japan on February 26, 2014, by King Records. This single was first performed at AKB48's "AKB48 Request Hour Setlist Best 200 2014" concert. This is Yuko Oshima's last senbatsu participation in AKB48. The single reached number one on Oricon and Billboard's weekly charts, and placed third overall in Oricon's year-end chart with 1,153,906 copies.

== Promotion and release ==
"Mae shika Mukanee", was first revealed to the public on January 24, 2014 at AKB48's "AKB48 Request Hour Setlist Best 200 2014 (Part 1)" concert at the Tokyo Dome City Hall. The title track's center performer is Yuko Oshima, and it is also her final senbatsu participation with AKB48. This also served as Ayaka Kikuchi (singer) and Misato Nonaka’s final single with the group. The members who participated in this song have participated in the group's previous song "Heart Electric". New participants include Mako Kojima and Akari Suda, and it is Kojima's first participation on an AKB48 title track. and Suda's first Senbatsu participation since Koisuru Fortune Cookie a year ago.

The lyrics were written by Yasushi Akimoto.

The single was released in four types; Type A (Normal / Limited Edition), Type B (Normal / Limited Edition), Type C (Normal / Limited Edition), and Theater Edition. The supporting tracks on the single are done by various subgroups: "Smiling Lions", "Beauty Giraffes", "Baby Elephants", and "Talking Chimpanzees".

The full version of the music video lasts more than 20 minutes, and it wasn't released on YouTube; instead, an edited version of MV only with the performance of the entire song has been published.

This song is performed in the last episode of variety show AKBingo! on September 24, 2019.

== Track list ==
=== Type A ===
All lyrics are written by Yasushi Akimoto.

CD
No.	Title	Music	Sub-unit	Length
1.	"Mae shika Mukanee" (前しか向かねえ, "I Only Look Forward")	Yasuyuki Kojo, Yusuke Itagaki		4:17
2.	"Kinō yori Motto Suki" (昨日よりもっと好き, "I Love You More Than I Did Yesterday")	Makoto Wakatabe	Smiling Lions
3.	"Kimi no Uso o Shitteita" (君の嘘を知っていた, "I Know You Lied")		Beauty Giraffes
4.	"Mae shika Mukanee" (off vocal ver.)			4:17
5.	"Kinō yori Motto Suki" (off vocal ver.)
6.	"Kimi no Uso o Shitteita" (off vocal ver.)

DVD
No.	Title	Director	Length
1.	"Mae shika Mukanee"	Naoto Kumazawa
2.	"Mae shika Mukanee" (Dance ver.)
3.	"Kinō yori Motto Suki"
4.	"Kimi no Uso o Shitteita"
5.	"Nakamari-Channel" (Video about Mariko Nakamura)

=== Type B ===
All lyrics are written by Yasushi Akimoto.

CD
No.	Title	Music	Sub-unit	Length
1.	"Mae shika Mukanee"	Kojo, Itagaki		4:17
2.	"Kinō yori Motto Suki"	Wakatabe	Smiling Lions
3.	"Himitsu no Diary" (秘密のダイアリー "The Secret Diary")	Hiroki Sasaki	Baby Elephants
4.	"Mae shika Mukanee" (off vocal ver.)			4:17
5.	"Kinō yori Motto Suki" (off vocal ver.)
6.	"Himitsu no Diary" (off vocal ver.)

DVD
No.	Title	Director	Length
1.	"Mae shika Mukanee"	Naoto Kumazawa
2.	"Mae shika Mukanee" (Dance ver.)	Kumazawa
3.	"Kinō yori Motto Suki"	Wataru Saito
4.	"Himitsu no Diary"	Takatoshi Tsuchiya
5.	"Rina Hirata London Report"	Taizo Hayashi

=== Type C ===
All lyrics are written by Yasushi Akimoto.

CD
No.	Title	Music	Sub-unit	Length
1.	"Mae shika Mukanee"	Kojo, Itagaki		4:17
2.	"Kinō yori Motto Suki"		Smiling Lions
3.	"Konjo" (KONJO)		Talking Chimpanzees
4.	"Mae shika Mukanee" (off vocal ver.)			4:17
5.	"Kinō yori Motto Suki" (off vocal ver.)
6.	"Konjo" (off vocal ver.)

DVD
No.	Title	Director	Length
1.	"Mae shika Mukanee"	Naoto Kumazawa
2.	"Mae shika Mukanee" (Dance ver.)
3.	"Kinō yori Motto Suki"
4.	"Kimi no Uso o Shitteita"
5.	"Konjo"
6.	"Tentōmu Chu! in Hawaii"

=== Theater edition ===
All lyrics are written by Yasushi Akimoto.

CD
No.	Title	Music	Sub-unit	Length
1.	"Mae shika Mukanee"	Kojo, Itagaki		4:17
2.	"Kinō yori Motto Suki"		Smiling Lions
3.	"Koi to ka..." (恋とか…, "Love Is...")
4.	"Mae shika Mukanee" (off vocal ver.)			4:17
5.	"Kinō yori Motto Suki" (off vocal ver.)
6.	"Koi to ka..." (off vocal ver.)

== Personnel ==
=== "Mae Shika Mukanee" All Stars ===
source: Center : Yuko Oshima

- AKB48 Team A: Rina Kawaei, Minami Takahashi, Yui Yokoyama, Mayu Watanabe
- AKB48 Team K: Yuko Oshima
- AKB48 Team B: Yuki Kashiwagi, Haruna Kojima, Haruka Shimazaki
- AKB48 Team 4: Mako Kojima, Minami Minegishi
- SKE48 Team S / AKB48 Team K: Jurina Matsui
- SKE48 Team KII: Akari Suda
- SKE48 Team E: Rena Matsui
- NMB48 Team N: Sayaka Yamamoto
- NMB48 Team N / AKB48 Team B: Miyuki Watanabe
- HKT48 Team H: Rino Sashihara

=== "Kinou Yori Motto Suki" Smiling Lions ===
- AKB48 Team A: Anna Iriyama
- AKB48 Team B: Rena Kato
- AKB48 Team 4: Nana Okada, Miki Nishino
- AKB48 Kenkyuusei: Nana Owada (Center)
- SKE48 Team S: Yuria Kizaki
- SKE48 Team E: Kanon Kimoto
- SKE48 Kenkyuusei: Ryoha Kitagawa
- NMB48 Team N: Miru Shiroma
- NMB48 Team M / AKB48 Team A: Fuuko Yagura
- NMB48 Team BII: Shu Yabushita
- NMB48 Kenkyuusei: Nagisa Shibuya
- HKT48 Team H: Sakura Miyawaki
- HKT48 Team H / AKB48 Team A: Haruka Kodama
- HKT48 Kenkyuusei: Meru Tashima, Mio Tomonaga

=== “Kimi no Uso wo Shitteita” Beauty Giraffes ===
- Team A: Ayaka Kikuchi, Sumire Sato
- Team K: Maria Abe, Rie Kitahara, Asuka Kuramochi, Shihori Suzuki, Nana Fujita, Tomu Muto, Ami Maeda, Mariya Nagao (Center)
- Team B: Reina Fujie
- Team 4: Mitsuki Maeda, Shinobu Mogi
- SKE48 Team E / AKB48 Team K: Nao Furuhata
- NMB48 Team N: Kei Jonishi, Akari Yoshida
- HKT48 Team H: Natsumi Matsuoka, Madoka Moriyasu
- JKT48 Team J / AKB48 Team B: Aki Takajo

=== "Himitsu no Diary" Baby Elephants ===
- AKB48 Team A: Ryoka Oshima, Marina Kobayashi, Yukari Sasaki, Juri Takahashi (center), Yūka Tano
- AKB48 Team B: Miyuu Omori, Miyu Takeuchi
- AKB48 Team B / NMB48 Team N: Miori Ichikawa
- AKB48 Team 4: Moe Aigasa, Ayana Shinozaki, Yuiri Murayama
- AKB48 Kenkyuusei: Mion Mukaichi
- SKE48 Team KII: Mizuho Yamada
- SKE48 Team E: Rion Azuma
- NMB48 Team N: Rina Kondo
- NMB48 Team BII: Yuuri Ota
- HKT48 Team H: Chihiro Anai, Aika Ota, Aoi Motomura
- HKT48 Kenkyuusei: Yuka Akiyoshi, Nako Yabuki

=== “KONJO” Talking Chimpanzees ===
- Team A: Karen Iwata
- Team K: Haruka Shimada
- Team B: Ayaka Umeda, Suzuran Yamauchi, Misaki Iwasa, Mina Oba, Mariko Nakamura (Center), Shizuka Oya
- Team 4: Saho Iwatate, Yurina Takashima,
- SKE48 Team KII: Aya Shibata, Akane Takayanagi, Airi Furukawa
- SKE48 Kenkyuusei: Kaori Matsumura
- NMB48 Team N: Mayu Ogasawara, Riho Miaki
- NMB48 Team M: Nana Yamada
- HKT48 Team H: Chiyori Nakanishi, Anna Murashige
- HKT48 Kenkyuusei: Marika Tani

=== "Koi to ka..." ===
(28 Members)

- Team A: Rina Izuta, Matsui Sakiko, Ayaka Morikawa
- Team K: Mayumi Uchida, Kana Kobayashi, Rina Chikano, Chisato Nakata, Miyazaki Miho
- Team B: Haruka Ishida, Haruka Katayama, Natsuki Kojima, Miku Tanabe, Wakana Natori, Misato Nonaka
- Team 4: Natsuki Uchiyama, Ayano Umeta, Ayaka Okada, Saki Kitazawa, Hashimoto Hikari
- Kenkyuusei: Ichikawa Manami, Okawa Rio, Haruka Komiyama, Kiara Sato, Tatsuya Makiho, Mizuki Tsuchiyasu, Seina Fukuoka, Ami Yumoto
- SNH48 Team SII / AKB48 Team A: Mariya Suzuki

== Charts ==
Chart (2014)	Peak position
Oricon Daily Singles Chart	1
Oricon Weekly Singles Chart	1
Billboard Japan Hot 100	1

== JKT48 version ==
"Mae Shika Mukanee -Always Looking Straight Ahead/Hanya Lihat Ke Depan-"

Single by JKT48
- B-side: Dakishimechaikenai; Kataomoi Finally; Migi e Magare!; Hashire! Penguin (Regular Edition)
- Released: June 1, 2016
- Genre: Pop Punk, Pop rock
- Label: Hits

JKT48 singles chronology
"Beginner" (2016)	"Mae Shika Mukanee -Always Looking Straight Ahead/Hanya Lihat Ke Depan-" (2016)	"Love Trip" (2016)

An Indonesian version of the song, "Mae Shika Mukanee -Hanya Lihat Ke Depan-", was released on June 1, 2016 by AKB48's sister group JKT48.

=== Release ===
The single has two versions: Regular Edition (CD+DVD) and Music Download Card. First Senbatsu of Dwi Putri Bonita, Dena Siti Rohyati and Shania Senbatsu and Undergirls decided from JKT48 13th Single Senbatsu Sousenkyo Ravenska Mamesah's last single.

=== Track listing ===
==== Regular Edition ====
CD
No.	Title	Writer(s)	Length
1.	"Mae Shika Mukanee -Always Looking Straight Ahead-"	Yasushi Akimoto
2.	"Dakishimechaikenai"
3.	"Kataomoi Finally"
4.	"Migi e Magare!"
5.	"Hashire! Penguin"
6.	"Always Looking Straight Ahead"

DVD
No.	Title	Length
1.	"Mae Shika Mukanee -Always Looking Straight Ahead- Music Video"
2.	"Dakishimechaikenai Music Video"

==== Music Card ====
Download
No.	Title	Writer(s)	Length
1.	"Mae Shika Mukanee -Always Looking Straight Ahead-"	Yasushi Akimoto
2.	"Dakishimechaikenai"
3.	"Always Looking Straight Ahead"

=== Mae Shika Mukanee ===
Center: Jessica Veranda

- Team J: Dena Siti Rohyati, Gabriela Margareth Warouw, Ghaida Farisya, Jessica Veranda, Melody Nurramdhani Laksani, Nabilah Ratna Ayu Azalia, Shania Junianatha, Thalia Ivanka Elizabeth
- Team KIII: Chikano Rina, Cindy Yuvia, Devi Kinal Putri, Dwi Putri Bonita, Priscillia Sari Dewi
- Team T: Michelle Christo Kusnadi, Nakagawa Haruka, Shania Gracia

=== Dakishimechaikenai ===
Center: Sinka Juliani

- Team J: Ayana Shahab, Beby Chaesara Anadila, Jessica Vania, Shinta Naomi, Sendy Ariani
- Team KIII: Della Delila, Nadila Cindi Wantari, Natalia, Ratu Vienny Fitrilya, Riskha Fairunissa, Saktia Oktapyani, Sinka Juliani, Viviyona Apriani
- Team T: Nadhifa Salsabila, Ni Made Ayu Vania Aurellia, Shani Indira Natio

=== Kataomoi Finally ===
Center: Melody Nurramdhani Laksani

- Team J: Ayana Shahab, Beby Chaesara Anadila, Dena Siti Rohyati, Frieska Anastasia Laksani, Gabriela Margareth Warouw, Ghaida Farisya, Jennifer Rachel Natasya, Jessica Vania, Jessica Veranda, Melody Nurramdhani Laksani, Nabilah Ratna Ayu Azalia, Rezky Wiranti Dhike, Sendy Ariani, Shania Junianatha, Shinta Naomi, Sonia Natalia, Thalia Ivanka Elizabeth

=== Migi e Magare! ===
Center: Cindy Yuvia

- Team KIII: Alicia Chanzia, Cindy Yuvia, Della Delila, Devi Kinal Putri, Dwi Putri Bonita, Fakhriyani Shafariyanti, Jennifer Hanna, Lidya Maulida Djuhandar, Nadila Cindi Wantari, Natalia, Priscillia Sari Dewi, Ratu Vienny Fitrilya, Chikano Rina, Riskha Fairunissa, Rona Anggreani, Saktia Oktapyani, Sinka Juliani, Viviyona Apriani

=== Hashire! Penguin ===
Center: Michelle Christo Kusnadi

- Team T: Amanda Dwi Arista, Aninditha Rahma Cahyadi, Ayu Safira Oktaviani, Chikita Ravenska Mamesah, Feni Fitriyanti, Fransisca Saraswati Puspa Dewi, Nakagawa Haruka, Maria Genoveva Natalia Desy Purnamasari Gunawan, Michelle Christo Kusnadi, Nadhifa Salsabila, Ni Made Ayu Vania Aurellia, Shani Indira Natio, Shania Gracia, Stephanie Pricilla Indarto Putri, Syahfira Angela Nurhaliza, Yansen Indiani
