= Rainbow (Sayaka Yamamoto album) =

- Regular edition

Studio album by Sayaka Yamamoto
- Released: October 26, 2016
- Recorded: 2016
- Genre: J-pop
- Length: 59:05
- Label: laugh out loud! records
- Producer: Yasushi Akimoto and Seiji Kameda

Sayaka Yamamoto chronology
Rainbow (2016)	Identity (2017)

Rainbow is the first album by Sayaka Yamamoto, a member of Japanese idol girl group NMB48. She made her solo debut with this album. It was released on 26 October 2016 under the label laugh out loud records. There are two editions. The limited edition includes a DVD with music video and the regular edition has only audio CD.

A musician Shikao Suga and Takuro, a guitarist of the rock band Glay provided a song but most of the songs and lyrics were written by herself. The sound producer is Seiji Kameda. He is best known as the former member of Tokyo Jihen.

It was number three on the weekly Oricon Albums Chart with 50,375 copies sold. It was number two on the Billboard Japan Album Sales Chart.

== Track listing ==
CD
No.	Title	Lyrics	Music	Arranger(s)	Length
1.	"Rainbow Rose" (レインボーローズ)	Sayaka Yamamoto	Sayaka Yamamoto	Seiji Kameda	4:34
2.	"Yukikoi" (雪恋)	Sayaka Yamamoto	Sayaka Yamamoto	Seiji Kameda	3:56
3.	"Hitokoto" (ヒトコト)	Junji Ishiwatari	Rui Momota	Seiji Kameda	4:04
4.	"Kanojo ni Naritai" (彼女になりたい)	Sayaka Yamamoto	Sayaka Yamamoto	Seiji Kameda	4:00
5.	"Ai no Baton" (愛のバトン)	Junji Ishiwatari	Kōichi Tsutaya	Seiji Kameda	4:47
6.	"Bad Days"	Takuro	Takuro	Seiji Kameda & Takuro	5:41
7.	"Tsukikage" (月影)	Sayaka Yamamoto	Sayaka Yamamoto	Seiji Kameda	3:50
8.	"Smile" (スマイル)	Seiji Kameda	Seiji Kameda	Seiji Kameda	4:11
9.	"Kokoro no Tate" (心の盾)	Sayaka Yamamoto	Sayaka Yamamoto	Seiji Kameda	4:37
10.	"Hitoiki Tsukinagara" (ひといきつきながら)	Junpei Iwata	Yūichi Ikuzawa	Seiji Kameda	5:05
11.	"Gimonfu" (疑問符)	Yasushi Akimoto	Sayaka Yamamoto	Seiji Kameda	4:58
12.	"Shiawase no Kakera" (幸せの欠片)	Sayaka Yamamoto	Sayaka Yamamoto	Seiji Kameda	4:18
13.	"Melody" (メロディ)	Shikao Suga	Shikao Suga	Seiji Kameda	4:55

DVD
No.	Title	Length
1.	"Yukikoi Music Video"
2.	"Special Footage 1 Rainbow Rose"
3.	"Special Footage 2 Album "Rainbow" Making"

== Charts ==
Chart (2016)	Peak position
Japanese Albums (Billboard)	2
Japanese Albums (Oricon)	3
