= Airi Tanigawa =

Airi Tanigawa 谷川 愛梨
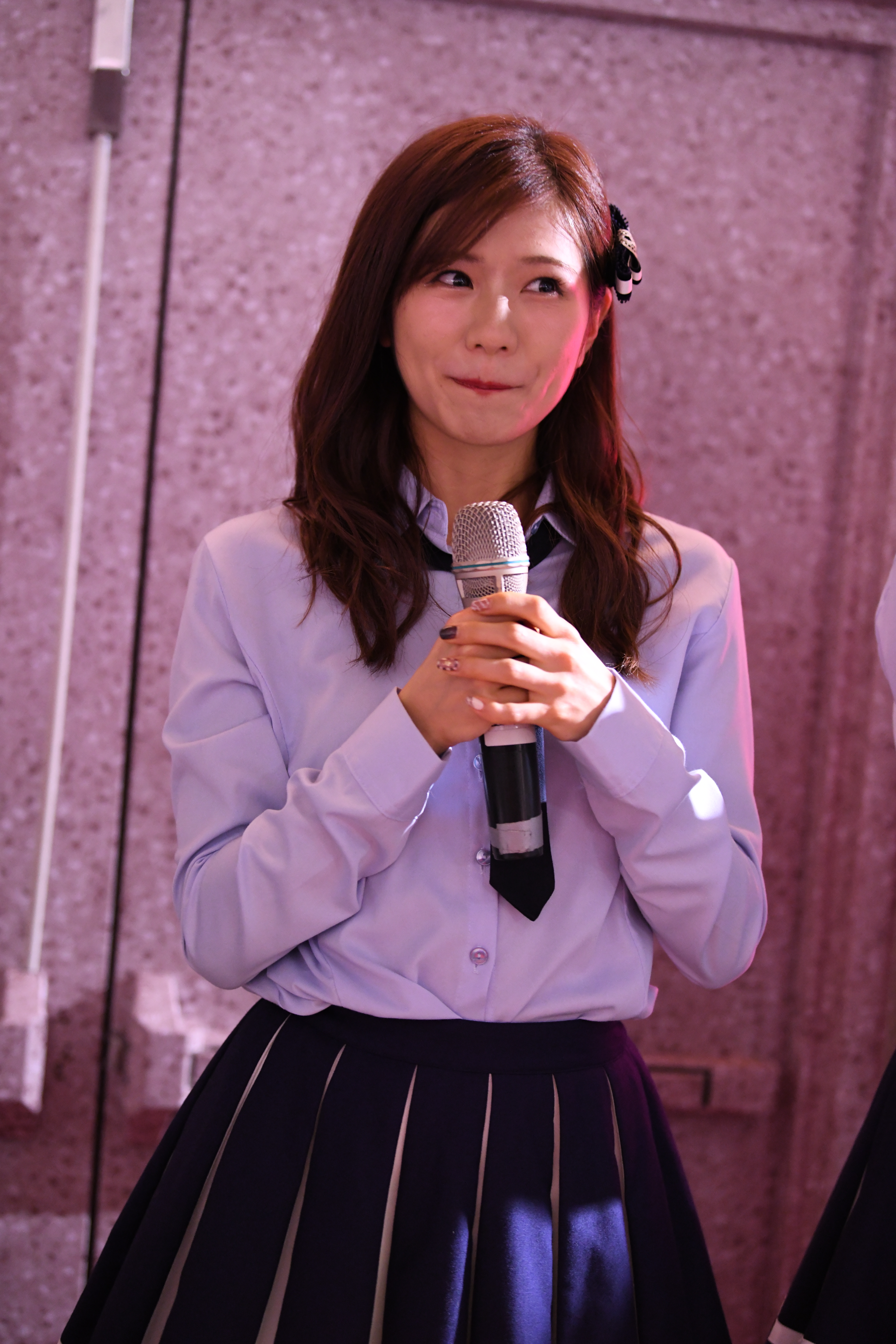
- Tanigawa in 2018

Background information
- Also known as: Airi
- Born: 5 December 1995 (age 30)
- Origin: Osaka Prefecture, Japan
- Genre: J-pop
- Occupations: Idol; singer
- Years active: 2011 – present
- Label: KYORAKU Yoshimoto Holdings
- Formerly of: NMB48

Airi Tanigawa (谷川 愛梨, Tanigawa Airi; born 5 December 1995) is a Japanese singer who is a former member of the idol girl group NMB48. She was a member of NMB48's Team N.

== Biography ==
Tanigawa was born in Osaka Prefecture. She passed NMB48's 2nd generation auditions in May 2011. Her audition song was "Kiseki" by GReeeeN. Her debut was on June 5, 2011. Her stage debut was on August 13, 2011. In January 2012, she was selected to join Team M.

Tanigawa's first NMB48 senbatsu was for the single Nagiichi.

Tanigawa did jazz dance for 7 years. Her dream is to be a multi-talent.

On November 2, 2019, Tanigawa announced that she will graduate from the group during NMB48's performance. she graduated from the group on December 25, 2019.

== Discography ==
=== NMB48 singles ===
Year	No.	Title	Role	Notes
2011	2	"Oh My God!"	B-side	Sang on "Boku wa Matteru" and "Nandeyanen, Idol"
2012	3	"Junjō U-19"	B-side	Sang on "Baatari GO!" and "Migi e Magare!"
2012	4	"Nagiichi"	A-side	First A-side. Also sang on "Boku ga Mou Sukoshi Daitan Nara" with Akagumi and "Hatsukoi no Yukue to Play Ball" with NMB Seven.
2012	5	"Virginity (song)"	A-side	Also sang on "Mōsō Girlfriend"
2012	6	"Kitagawa Kenji"	A-side	Also sang on "In-Goal"
2013	7	"Bokura no Eureka"	A-side	
2013	8	"Kamonegix"	A-side	
2014	9	"Takane no Ringo"	A-side	
2014	10	"Rashikunai"	A-side	Also sang on "Migi ni Shiteru Ring" as Team M
2015	11	"Don't look back!"	A-side	

=== AKB48 singles ===
Year	No.	Title	Role	Notes
2012	27	"Gingham Check"	B-side	Sang on "Ano Hi no Fuurin"
2013	34	"Suzukake no Ki no Michi de "Kimi no Hohoemi o Yume ni Miru" to Itte Shimattara Bokutachi no Kankei wa Dō Kawatte Shimau no ka, Bokunari ni Nan-nichi ka Kangaeta Ue de no Yaya Kihazukashii Ketsuron no Yō na Mono"	B-side	Sang on "Kimi to Deatte Boku wa Kawatta"
2015	39	"Green Flash"	B-side	Sang on "Punkish"

== Appearances ==
=== Stage Units ===
NMB48 Kenkyuusei Stage "Party ga Hajimaru yo"

1. "Skirt, Hirari"

Team M 1st Stage "Idol no Yoake"

1. "Itoshiki Natasha"

Team M 2nd Stage "RESET"

1. "Kiseki wa ma ni Awanai"

=== Variety Shows ===
- NMB48 Geinin! (2012)
