= Reina Fujie =

Musical artist (born 1994)

Reina Fujie 藤江 れいな
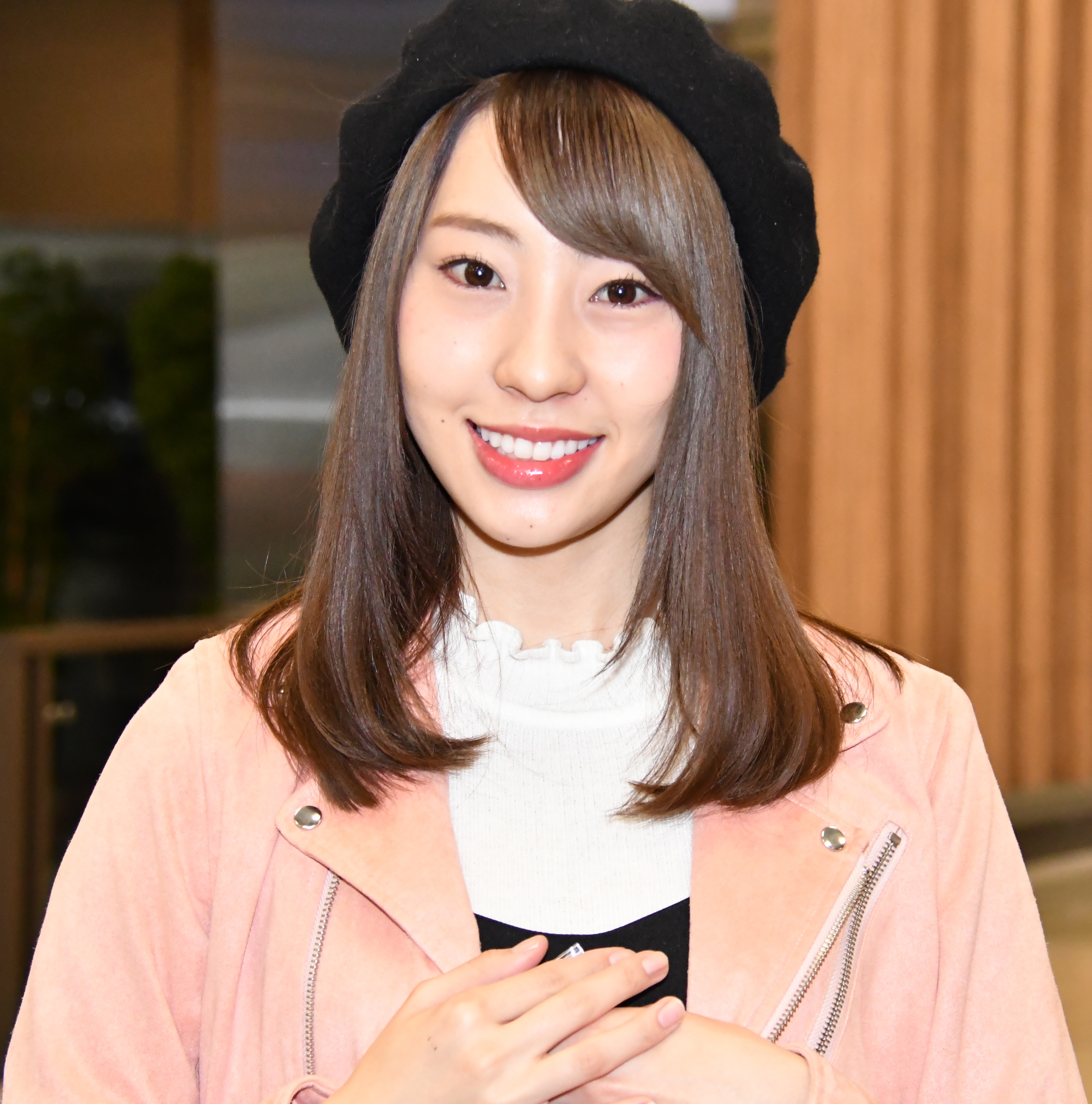

Background information
- Born: 1 February 1994 (age 31); Kamagaya, Chiba Prefecture, Japan
- Genres: J-pop
- Occupations: Actress
- Years active: 2007–Present
- Labels: King Records

Reina Fujie (藤江 れいな, Fujie Reina; born 1 February 1994, in Kamagaya, Chiba Prefecture), is a Japanese actress and former singer. She is a former member NMB48's Team BII and former member of AKB48. She is a cousin of Berryz Kobo sub- captain Miyabi Natsuyaki.

Fujie is represented with Itoh Company.

== NMB48/AKB48 discography ==
=== Singles ===
NMB48

Single	Song	Under	Ref.
"Rashikunai"	"Migi ni shi teru Ring"	Team M	
"Don't Look Back!"	"Heart, Sakebu"	Team M	
"Dorian Shōnen"	"Boku dake no Secret time"	Team M	
"Must Be Now"	"Kataomoi yori mo Omoide o"		
"Must Be Now"	"Good-bye, Guitar"	Team M	
"Amagami Hime"	"Koi o Isoge"	Team M	
"Boku wa Inai"	"Saigo no Go-Shakutama"	Team M	
"Boku Igai no Dareka"	"Let it snow!"	Team BII	

AKB48

Single	Song	Under	Ref.
"10nen Sakura"	"Sakurairo no Sora no Shita de"		
"Namida Surprise!"			
"River"	"Kimi no koto ga Sukidakara"	Under Girls	
"Ponytail to Shushu"	"Nusuma reta Kuchibiru"	Under Girls	
"Heavy Rotation"	"Namida no Seesaw Game"	Under Girls	
"Beginner"	"Boku dake no value"	Under Girls	
"Chance no Junban"	"Alive"	Team K	
"Sakura no Ki ni Narō"	"Gūzen no Jūjiro"	Under Girls	
"Everyday, Katyusha"	"Hito no Chikara"	Under Girls	
"Flying Get"	"Dakishimecha ikenai"	Under Girls	
"Kaze wa Fuiteiru"	"Kimi no Senaka"	Under Girls	
"Ue kara Mariko"	"Zero Sam Taiyō"	Team K	
"Give Me Five!"	"Hitsujikai no Tabi"	Special Girls B	
"Manatsu no Sounds Good!"	"Gugutasu no Sora"		
"Gingham Check"	"Do-Re-Mi-Fa Onchi"	Next Girls	
"Uza"	"Seigi no Mikata janai Hero"	Team B	
"Eien Pressure"	"Eien yori Tsuzuku yō ni"	OKL48	
"So Long!"	"Waiting room"	Under Girls	
"So Long!"	"Sokode Inu no unchi Fun jau ka ne?"	Umeda Team B	
"Sayonara Crawl"	"Romance Kenjū"	Team B	
"Koi Suru Fortune Cookie"	"Ai no Imi o Kangaete mita"	Under Girls	
"Heart Electric"	"Tiny T-shirt"	Team B	
"Suzukake no Ki no Michi de "Kimi no Hohoemi o Yume ni Miru" to Itte Shimattara Bokutachi no Kankei wa Dō Kawatte Shimau no ka, Bokunari ni Nannichi ka Kangaeta Ue de no Yaya Kihazukashii Ketsuron no Yō na Mono"			
"Mae shika Mukanee"	"Kimi no Uso o Shitteita"	Beauty Giraffes	
"Kokoro no Placard"	"Hito Natsu no Hankō-ki"	Next Girls	
"Green Flash"	"Punkish"	NMB48	
"Halloween Night"	"Mizu no Naka no Dendō-ritsu"	Next Girls	
"Kimi wa Melody"	"Shigamitsuita Seishun"	NMB48	
"Love Trip / Shiawase wo Wakenasai"	"Shinka shi tenējan"	Next Girls	

=== Albums ===
NMB48

Title	Song	Under
Sekai no Chuushin wa Osaka ya ~Namba Jichiku~	"Ibiza Girl"	
Sekai no Chuushin wa Osaka ya ~Namba Jichiku~	"Natsu no Saimin-jutsu"	Team M
Sekai no Chuushin wa Osaka ya ~Namba Jichiku~	"Peak"	

AKB48

Year	Title	Under
Kamikyokutachi	"Kimi to Niji to Taiyō to"	
Koko ni Ita Koto	"Boku ni dekiru koto"	Team K
Koko ni Ita Koto	"Koko ni Ita Koto"	AKB48+SKE48+SDN48+NMB48
1830m	"Iede no Yoru"	Team K
1830m	"Gū gū onaka"	
1830m	"Aozora yo: Sabishikunai ka?"	AKB48+SKE48+NMB48+HKT48
Tsugi no Ashiato	"10 Krone to Pan"	
Tsugi no Ashiato	"Kanashiki Kinkyori Renai"	Team B
Koko ga Rhodes da, Koko de Tobe!	"Iki Tsuzukeru"	

=== Stage units ===
AKB48

Title	Song	Notes
Himawari-gumi 1st Stage: Boku no Taiyō	"Idol nante Yobanaide"	Debut; under Erena Ono and Manami Oku
Team B 2nd Stage: Aitakatta	"Nageki no Figure"	
Team B 2nd Stage: Aitakatta	"Nagisa no Cherry"	Centre
Team B 2nd Stage: Aitakatta	"Senaka kara Dakishimete"	
Team B 2nd Stage: Aitakatta	"Rio no Kakumei"	Under Mayu Watanabe
Himawari-gumi 2nd Stage: Yume o Shina seru wake ni ikanai	"Hajimete no Jellybeans"	Sae Miyazawa's standby. However, in some programmes she was double cast with Miyazawa.
Team A 4th Stage: Tadaima Renai-chū	"7-Ji 12-bu no Hatsukoi"	Under Atsuko Maeda
Kenkyūsei: Tadaima Renai-chū	"7-Ji 12-bu no Hatsukoi"	
Team A 5th Stage: Renai Kinshi Jōrei	"Kuroi Tenshi"	Under Maeda
Team A 5th Stage: Renai Kinshi Jōrei	"Tsundere!"	Unit under Tomomi Itano
Theatre G-Rosso: Yume o Shina seru wake ni ikanai	"Tonari no Banana"	Tomomi Kasai, Aki Takajo, Haruka Nakagawa and Misaki Iwasa's standby
Theatre G-Rosso: Yume o Shina seru wake ni ikanai	"Hajimete no Jellybeans"	Miyazawa, Takajo, Sayaka Nakaya and Mariya Suzuki's standby
Team K 6th Stage: Reset	"Kokoro no Hashi no Sofa"	
Team K 6th Stage: Reset	"Seifuku Resistance"	Unit under Itano and Yui Yokoyama
Team K 5th Stage: Gyaku Agari	"Dakishime raretara"	

NMB48

Title	Song
Team K 6th Stage: Reset	"Ashita no tame ni Kiss o"

== Works ==
=== Videos ===
Year	Title	Role
2009	Tokonatsu Girl	
2010	Megane no Tenkōsei	Arisa Kinoshita
2010	Kamen Rider W Hyper Battle DVD: Donburi's α/Farewell Beloved Recipe	Eriko Aida
2011	shining girl	

== Filmography ==
=== TV dramas ===
Year	Title	Role	Network	Notes
2010	Majisuka Gakuen	Majisuka Gakuen student	TV Tokyo	Final episode
2010	GeGeGe no Nyōbō	Female TV advert tarento	NHK	Episode 93
2011	Hanchō –Jinnan-sho Asaka Han– Series 4 –Seigi no Daishō–	Yuruna Hattori	TBS	Episode 4
2011	Karakuri Samurai Sesshaawan 1	Rena Tsuwa	SUT	
2011	Majisuka Gakuen 2	Reina	TV Tokyo	Final episode
2013	So long!	Misato Ando	NTV	Episode 3
2013	Amachan	Aki Amano's classmate	NHK	Episode 6
2013	Tenma-san ga yuku	Herself	TBS	Episodes 2 and 3

=== Other TV programmes ===
Current appearances

Year	Title	Network	Notes	Ref.
2008	AKBingo!	NTV	Irregular appearances	
2009	AKB48 Neshin TV	Family Gekijo		
2010	Ariyoshi AKB Kyōwakoku	TBS	Irregular appearances	
2012	AKB48 no anta, Dare?	NotTV	Irregular appearances	
2012	The Best	Nihon Eiga Senmon Channel	Secretary	
2013	Reina Fujie presents Girls Pop Live!!	Programme MC		

Former appearances

Year	Title	Network	Notes
2008	AKB 0-ji 59 fun!	NTV	
2009	Suiensaa	NHK-E	Occasional appearances; appeared more than seven times
2009	Shūkan AKB	TV Tokyo	Occasional appearances
2010	Shōri no Megami 5	CTC	
2010	Nekketsu Bo-So TV	CTC	
2011	Reina Fujie-Rina Konno no madamada korekara	Pigoo HD, Enta! 371	
2011	AKB48 Conte: Bimyō	Hikari TV Channel	
2012	Kaiun Ongakudō	TBS	Assistant; "self-proclaimed" programme producer
2012	Girls News Girls Pop	Pigoo HD, Enta! 371	Main programme MC
2013	AKB48 Conte: Nani mo soko made...	Hikari TV Channel	
2014	NMB48 Geinin!!! 3	NTV	

=== Films ===
Year	Title	Role	Notes	Ref.
2011	Naked Boyz Short Movie Vol. 1: Jibun-sei Chūkei	Nanako		
2011	Enkiri Village: Dead End Survival	Enkiri-sama	Lead role	
2011	Itoh Tube Short Movie Collection: Mannequin Shōjo	Mannequin		
2012	Shi ga Futari Wowakatsumade... Dai 2-shō: Nankaka	Leila	Dual leading role alongside Toshiyuki Toyonaga	
2013	Hōkago-tachi: Do you think about me?	Aya Kominato	Lead role	
2014	Reina Fujie Movie Festival			
2014	Nemuri Hime Dream On Dreamer	Ayame Jinguuji	Lead role	
2014	Itsuka no, Genkan-tachi to,	Ayame Otsuka	Lead role	
2015	Vietnam no Kaze ni Fukarete	Maki Sakaguchi		
2017	Kyōfu-teki Shinsō	Yao	Lead role	

=== Radio ===
Year	Title	Network	Notes	Ref.
2008	AKB48 Ashita made mō chotto.	NCB	Occasional appearances	
2010	AKB48 no All Night Nippon	NBS		
2012	Good Day G.W. Edition: Idol Monday	FM Fuji	Special DJ	
2012	Listen? Live 4 Life	NCB	(Note: She was originally to appear on 7 August 2012, but the programme was suspended due to live coverage of the 2012 Summer Olympics, in which it was postponed for one week.) (Note: Asuka Kuramochi originally planned to appear on its 18 December broadcast, but was replaced due to a poor physical condition.)	
2013	Gocha maze'! Suiyōbi	MBS Radio		
2015	NMB48 Rika to Dareka no Girls Talk	Radio Kansai	Irregular appearances	

=== Radio dramas ===
Year	Title	Role	Network
2010	Seishun Adventure: Go Go! Chickens 2	Fan	NHK FM
2010	Seishun Adventure: Jinnan no Haha no Bibōroku 1 "Itoshino Jessica"		NHK FM
2011	AKB48 no "Watashitachi no Monogatari": Rock de ikou ze!	Narrator	NHK FM
2011	AKB48 no "Watashitachi no Monogatari": Dareka	Herself	NHK FM
2011	AKB48 no "Watashitachi no Monogatari": Christmas Special "Ue kara Orite kita Mariko"	Reina's Reindeer	NHK FM
2012	AKB Radio Drama Gekijō: Victory e Zenshin		NBS
2012	AKB Radio Drama Gekijō: Mensetsu no Ukekata		NBS
2012	AKB Radio Drama Gekijō: Nigatena Free Throw		NBS
2012	AKB Radio Drama Gekijō: Sensō to Heiwa		NBS
2012	AKB Radio Drama Gekijō: Never Give Up, Watashi		NBS

=== Stage ===
Year	Title	Role	Notes
2010	Asakusa acharaka	Hinako Fukutomi	
2014	Algorithm, Tora yo!		First lead role in stage
2014	Danganronpa The Stage: Trigger Happy Havoc	Aoi Asahina	Dual lead role with Nagisa Oshima

=== Musicals ===
Year	Title
2010	Hyper Crazy Fashion Musical

=== Events ===
Year	Title	Ref.
2009	Dai 21-kai Toyohira Gawa Marathon: Half Marathon no Bu	
2012	Club 333 Night View DJ	
2012	Reina Fujie no Real 22-Ji no Yome	
2012	Machikado Bijin Presents Color-i Pet Collection Vol. 1	
2013	Reina Fujie (AKB48) Konni-Chiba Meeting	
2014	Tottori Marathon 2014	

=== Music videos ===
Year	Title	Ref.
2016	Yuki Tokunaga "Koi wa Nandoku Ekimei"	

=== Others ===
Year	Title	Notes
2010	Mother Bokujō LaLaport Tokyo-Bay	Manager for a day

== Bibliography ==
=== Photobooks ===
Year	Title	ISBN
2008	B.L.T. U-17 summer	ISBN 978-4863360174
2009	B.L.T. U-17 Vol.11 sizzleful girl 2009 summer	ISBN 978-4863360600
2011	Reina	ISBN 4575303348

=== Magazine serials ===
Year	Title	Ref.
2013	Digi Capa! "Idol Shashin-ka Ikusei Keikaku!!"	

=== Calendars ===
Year	Title
2009	Reina Fujie-Rina Konno 2010-nen Calendar
2010	Reina Fujie 2011-nen Calendar
2011	Reina Fujie 2012-nen Calendar
2012	Takujō Reina Fujie 2013-nen Calendar
2013	Kabekake Reina Fujie 2014-nen Calendar
2013	Takujō Reina Fujie 2014-nen Calendar

=== E-book ===
Year	Title
2011	Yado Vice
