= Suzukake Nanchara =

"Suzukake no Ki no Michi de 'Kimi no Hohoemi o Yume ni Miru' to Itte Shimattara Bokutachi no Kankei wa Dō Kawatte Shimau no ka, Bokunari ni Nannichi ka Kangaeta Ue de no Yaya Kihazukashii Ketsuron no Yō na Mono"
- "Type A" release. Rina Hirata, Jurina Matsui & Emika Kamieda (l. to r.)

Single by AKB48

from the album Koko ga Rhodes da, Koko de Tobe!
- Released: December 11, 2013
- Genre: J-pop
- Length: 5:29
- Label: You, Be Cool! / King
- Songwriter: Tetsurō Oda (music)
- Producer: Yasushi Akimoto

AKB48 singles chronology
"Heart Electric" (2013)	"Suzukake no Ki no Michi de 'Kimi no Hohoemi o Yume ni Miru' to Itte Shimattara Bokutachi no Kankei wa Dō Kawatte Shimau no ka, Bokunari ni Nannichi ka Kangaeta Ue de no Yaya Kihazukashii Ketsuron no Yō na Mono" (2013)	"Mae shika Mukanee" (2014)

Music videos
- "Suzukake no Ki no Michi de... Yaya Kihazukashii Ketsuron no Yō na Mono" on YouTube

"Suzukake no Ki no Michi de 'Kimi no Hohoemi o Yume ni Miru' to Itte Shimattara Bokutachi no Kankei wa Dō Kawatte Shimau no ka, Bokunari ni Nannichi ka Kangaeta Ue de no Yaya Kihazukashii Ketsuron no Yō na Mono" (鈴懸の木の道で「君の微笑みを夢に見る」と言ってしまったら僕たちの関係はどう変わってしまうのか、僕なりに何日か考えた上でのやや気恥ずかしい結論のようなもの; or literally "Sort of a little bit embarrassing conclusion I came to after thinking for days about how our relationship would change if while walking along a road of plane trees I said to you, 'I dream of your smile'") – also commonly abridged/known as "Kimi no Hohoemi wo Yume ni Miru" (君の微笑みを夢に見る; "I See Your Smile in My Dream") or "Suzukake Nanchara" (鈴懸なんちゃら; "Plane Tree Something...") – is the 34th single by the Japanese idol girl group AKB48. It was released in Japan on December 11, 2013.

The single placed fourth on the Japanese Oricon year-end chart for 2014, with 1,086,491 copies sold in Japan as of December 20, 2014.

== Title ==
The Japanese title of the single is 76 characters long. Due to the length of the title, its name was orally shortened to "Suzukake Nanchara" (鈴懸なんちゃら; "Plane Tree Something...") at the group's performance at the NHK Hall, aired on their weekly show on NHK and in other instances to "Suzukake no Ki no Michi de ... Yaya Kihazukashii Ketsuron no Yō na Mono" (鈴懸の木の道で...（略）やや気恥ずかしい結論のようなもの; where "Ryaku" (略) is a Japanese marker for an abbreviation or omission).

== Composition and recording ==
The track was composed by Tetsurō Oda. The 16 members to participate in the recording of the title track were selected in a rock–paper–scissors tournament, held among the members of AKB48 and its sister groups on September 18, 2013, at Nippon Budokan.

== Release and reception ==
The song was premiered live at the Best Hit Song Festival 2013 on November 21, 2013. The single was released on 11 December 2013 in five versions: Type A, Type S, Type N, Type H, and a "theater edition".

According to Oricon, in the first week of release the single sold 1,033,336 copies in Japan, which placed it first on the Oricon Weekly CD Singles chart. The single placed fourth on the Oricon year-end chart for 2014, with 1,086,491 copies sold in the country as of December 20. In 2015, the song placed 1st at the Request Hour Setlist 1035, a series of concerts held in Tokyo Dome City Hall between January 21 and 25 of that year.

== Track listings ==
The CD tracks 1–2, 4–5 and the DVD tracks 1–3 are the same for all editions. The Theater Edition does not include a DVD.

=== Type A ===
CD
No.	Title	Music	Artist	Length
1.	"Suzukake no Ki no Michi de 'Kimi no Hohoemi o Yume ni Miru' to Itte Shimattara Bokutachi no Kankei wa Dō Kawatte Shimau no ka, Bokunari ni Nannichi ka Kangaeta Ue de no Yaya Kihazukashii Ketsuron no Yō na Mono" (鈴懸の木の道で「君の微笑みを夢に見る」と言ってしまったら僕たちの関係はどう変わってしまうのか、僕なりに何日か考えた上でのやや気恥ずかしい結論のようなもの)	Tetsurō Oda	AKB48	5:28
2.	"Mosh & Dive" (Mosh&Dive)		AKB48	3:36
3.	"Party Is Over" (Party is over)		AKB48	5:53
4.	"Suzukake no Ki no Michi de 'Kimi no Hohoemi o Yume ni Miru' to Itte Shimattara Bokutachi no Kankei wa Dō Kawatte Shimau no ka, Bokunari ni Nannichi ka Kangaeta Ue de no Yaya Kihazukashii Ketsuron no Yō na Mono (Instrumental)" (鈴懸の木の道で「君の微笑みを夢に見る」と言ってしまったら僕たちの関係はどう変わってしまうのか、僕なりに何日か考えた上でのやや気恥ずかしい結論のようなもの off vocal ver.)	Tetsuro Oda	AKB48	5:28
5.	"Mosh & Dive (Instrumental)" (Mosh&Dive off vocal ver.)		AKB48	3:36
6.	"Party Is Over (Instrumental)" (Party is over off vocal ver.)		AKB48	5:50
Total length:				29:53

DVD
No.	Title	Length
1.	"Suzukake no Ki no Michi de 'Kimi no Hohoemi o Yume ni Miru' to Itte Shimattara Bokutachi no Kankei wa Dō Kawatte Shimau no ka, Bokunari ni Nannichi ka Kangaeta Ue de no Yaya Kihazukashii Ketsuron no Yō na Mono (Music Video – Short Film Ver.)" (鈴懸の木の道で「君の微笑みを夢に見る」と言ってしまったら僕たちの関係はどう変わってしまうのか、僕なりに何日か考えた上でのやや気恥ずかしい結論のようなもの Music Video -Short Film ver.-)
2.	"Suzukake no Ki no Michi de 'Kimi no Hohoemi o Yume ni Miru' to Itte Shimattara Bokutachi no Kankei wa Dō Kawatte Shimau no ka, Bokunari ni Nannichi ka Kangaeta Ue de no Yaya Kihazukashii Ketsuron no Yō na Mono (Music Video)" (鈴懸の木の道で「君の微笑みを夢に見る」と言ってしまったら僕たちの関係はどう変わってしまうのか、僕なりに何日か考えた上でのやや気恥ずかしい結論のようなもの Music Video)
3.	"Mosh & Dive (Music Video)" (Mosh&Dive Music Video)
4.	"Party Is Over (Music Video)" (Party is over Music Video)

=== Type S ===
CD
No.	Title	Artist	Length
3.	"Escape" (Esukēpu)	SKE48	4:11
6.	"Escape (Instrumental)" (Escape off vocal ver.)		4:09
Total length:			26:30

DVD
No.	Title	Length
4.	"Escape (Music Video)" (Escape Music Video)
5.	"AKB48 34th Single Senbatsu Janken Taikai Documentary (subject to change)" (AKB48 34thシングル 選抜じゃんけん大会ドキュメント（仮）)

=== Type N ===
CD
No.	Title	Artist	Length
3.	"Kimi to Deatte Boku wa Kawatta!" (君と出会って僕は変わった)	NMB48	4:18
6.	"Kimi to Deatte Boku wa Kawatta! (Instrumental)" (君と出会って僕は変わった off vocal ver.)		4:19

DVD
No.	Title	Length
4.	"Kimi to Deatte Boku wa Kawatta! (Music Video)" (Escape Music Video)
5.	"Saijaku Joō Kettei-sen – Ura Janken Taikai (subject to change)" (最弱女王決定戦 裏じゃんけん大会（仮）)

=== Type H ===
CD
No.	Title	Artist	Length
3.	"Wink wa 3-kai" (ウインクは3回 Uinku wa San-kai)	HKT48	4:17
6.	"Wink wa 3-kai (Instrumental)" (ウインクは3回 off vocal ver.)		4:17

DVD
No.	Title	Length
4.	"Wink wa 3-kai (Music Video)" (ウインクは3回 Music Video)
5.	"Love Shugyō (Music Video)" (LOVE修行 Music Video)

=== Theater Edition ===
CD
No.	Title	Artist	Length
3.	"Erande Rainbow"	Tentōmu Chu!	4:20
6.	"Erande Rainbow (Instrumental)"		4:20

== Personnel ==
=== Suzukake no Ki no Michi de ... Yaya Kihazukashii Ketsuron no Yō na Mono ===
The members who are participated in the recording were determined by the 2013 AKB48 Rock-paper-scissors Tournament. Each participant is listed with her placement result.

Center: Jurina Matsui

- Team A: Ayaka Kikuchi (8), Yukari Sasaki (14), Yūka Tano (7)
- Team K: Maria Abe (5), Rie Kitahara (10), Rina Hirata (3)
- Team B: Shizuka Oya (9), Wakana Natori (6), Reina Fujie (11)
- Kenkyūsei: Mizuki Tsuchiyasu (13), Ami Yumoto (16)
- Team B / SKE48 Team KII: Mina Ōba (4)
- SKE48 Team S / AKB48 Team K: Jurina Matsui (1)
- SKE48 Team E / AKB48 Team K: Nao Furuhata (15)
- NMB48 Team BII: Emika Kamieda (2)
- NMB48 Kenkyūsei: Mizuki Uno (12)

=== Mosh & Dive ===
Source: King Records

- Team A: Anna Iriyama, Rina Kawaei, Minami Takahashi, Yui Yokoyama, Mayu Watanabe
- Team K: Yūko Ōshima, Asuka Kuramochi, Mariya Nagao, Tomu Mutō
- Team B: Ayaka Umeda, Yuki Kashiwagi, Rena Katō, Haruna Kojima, Haruka Shimazaki
- Team 4: Saho Iwatate, Minami Minegishi, Yuiri Murayama
- Team B / NMB48 Team N: Miori Ichikawa, Miyuki Watanabe
- SKE48 Team KII: Akari Suda
- SKE48 Team E: Rena Matsui
- NMB48 Team N: Sayaka Yamamoto
- HKT48 Team H / AKB48 Team A: Haruka Kodama
- HKT48 Team H: Rino Sashihara
- JKT48 Team J / AKB48 Team B: Aki Takajō

=== Party is over ===
Sung by AKB48.

Center: Nana Owada

- Team A: Anna Iriyama, Rina Kawaei, Minami Takahashi, Yui Yokoyama, Mayu Watanabe
- Team K: Yūko Ōshima, Mariya Nagao
- Team B: Yuki Kashiwagi, Rena Katō, Haruna Kojima, Haruka Shimazaki
- Team 4: Nana Okada, Mako Kojima, Miki Nishino, Minami Minegishi
- AKB48 Kenkyūsei: Nana Owada

=== Escape ===
Sung by SKE48.

Center: Mizuho Yamada

- SKE48 Team S: Anna Ishida, Masana Ōya, Yuria Kizaki, Yūka Nakanishi, Manatsu Mukaida
- SKE48 Team S / AKB48 Team K: Jurina Matsui
- SKE48 Team KII: Aya Shibata, Akari Suda, Akane Takayanagi, Airi Furukawa, Mizuho Yamada
- SKE48 Team KII / AKB48 Team B: Mina Ōba
- SKE48 Team E: Rion Azuma, Kanon Kimoto, Nanako Suga, Rena Matsui
- SKE48 Team E / AKB48 Team K: Nao Furuhata
- SKE48 Kenkyūsei: Ryōha Kitagawa

=== Kimi to Deatte Boku wa Kawatta ===
Sung by NMB48.

The center for this song was Nagisa Shibuya.

- Team B / NMB48 Team N: Miori Ichikawa, Miyuki Watanabe
- NMB48 Team N: Mayu Ogasawara, Riho Kotani, Kei Jonishi, Miru Shiroma, Sayaka Yamamoto, Akari Yoshida
- NMB48 Team M: Yui Takano, Sae Murase, Nana Yamada
- NMB48 Team M / AKB48 Team A: Fūko Yagura
- NMB48 Team BII: Yūka Kato, Emika Kamieda, Shu Yabushita
- NMB48 Kenkyūsei: Nagisa Shibuya

=== Wink wa Sankai ===
Sung by HKT48

Center: Nako Yabuki

- Team A / HKT48 Team H: Haruka Kodama
- HKT48 Team H: Chihiro Anai, Aika Ōta, Serina Kumazawa, Rino Sashihara, Natsumi Tanaka, Natsumi Matsuoka, Sakura Miyawaki, Anna Murashige, Aoi Motomura, Madoka Moriyasu
- HKT48 Kenkyūsei: Kanna Okada, Meru Tashima, Mio Tomonaga, Mai Fuchigami, Nako Yabuki

== Charts ==
=== Billboard charts ===
Chart (2013)	Peak position
Billboard Japan Hot 100	1

=== Oricon charts ===
Singles Chart	Peak position	Sales
Daily Chart	1	1,066,665
Weekly Chart	1	1,066,665
Monthly Chart	1	1,066,665

== Release history ==
Date	Version	Catalog	Format	Label
December 11, 2013	Type-A	Regular Edition (KIZM-253~4)	CD+DVD	King Records
December 11, 2013	Type-S	Regular Edition (KIZM-255~6)	CD+DVD	King Records
December 11, 2013	Type-N	Regular Edition (KIZM-257~8)	CD+DVD	King Records
December 11, 2013	Type-H	Regular Edition (KIZM-259~60)	CD+DVD	King Records
December 11, 2013	Theater	Regular Edition (NMAX-1159)	CD	King Records
