= Miori Ichikawa =

Japanese actress and singer (born 1994)

Miori Ichikawa 市川 美織
- Also known as: Miorin (みおりん)
- Born: February 12, 1994 (age 32)
- Origin: Saitama, Japan
- Genres: J-pop
- Occupations: Japanese idol; singer; actress
- Years active: 2005—present
- Label: Project Ogi

Miori Ichikawa (市川 美織, Ichikawa Miori; born February 12, 1994) is a Japanese actress and former member of Japanese idol groups AKB48 and NMB48. She is known for her "Fresh Lemon" character and is the Hiroshima Lemon Ambassador since 2014.

== Biography ==
Ichikawa debuted in the entertainment industry under Stardust Promotion in 2005, as a member of the idol group "Power Age". After parting from the group during April 2006, she transferred over to Box Corporation, and in 2008, she became one of Office Fukuta's models.

In March 2010, Ichikawa passed AKB48's tenth generation audition, consequently becoming one of several research student candidates—and later, on June 12, a full research student—under AKS. On June 19, she made her debut in the theatre as Yuka Masuda's understudy during AKB48 Team B's "Theatre no Megami". Alongside nine other research students, Ichikawa was appointed for the “Kaspersky Lab Internet Security 2011“‘s promotion in “AKB48 Kaspersky Laboratory” on September 7, which would then be led by fellow group member Atsuko Maeda. On March 10, 2011, she became part of a collaborated unit funded by the magazine Young Jump, "YJ7".

Ichikawa was promoted to a full member of AKB48 on May 29, 2011, during a handshake event at Yokohama Stadium for "Everyday, Kachuusha!". Only days later, in the midst of “‘Minogashita Kimitachi e’ 〜AKB48 Group Performances〜” in Tokyo Dome City Hall on June 6th, the formation of Team 4 was announced alongside their first performance, a revival of Himawarigumi’s first stage, “Boku no Taiyou”—with Ichikawa being amongst the ten founding members. She ranked number 39 with 4,928 votes in AKB48’s 22nd Single General Election, thereby becoming a part of the Under Girls.

Ichikawa is known for her "Fresh Lemon" character, which includes her preference for clothing with lemon motifs and her signature catchphrase, "I want to be a fresh lemon".

On March 25, 2012, during the third day of “Tanomuzo, Katayama Buchou! in Saitama Super Arena”, it was announced that Ichikawa would switch agencies from AKS to Production Ogi. On May 23, she debuted in senbatsu with AKB48's 26th single, "Manatsu no Sounds Good!", and in the following month, she ranked number 58 in the 27th Single's General Election, landing a position in Future Girls with 5,963 votes. After four months, her transition from AKS to Production Ogi was finally completed by July.

During the opening night of “AKB48 in TOKYO DOME 〜1830m no Kawa〜” on August 24, it was revealed that Team 4 would be disbanded; Ichikawa would, instead, transfer to Team B. She began her activities under the newly reformed Team B on November 1, and performed as part of the starting lineup for their waiting stage on the 3rd. On March 13, 2013, Ichikawa was cast as the Vocaloid Kagamine Rin in "Senbonzakura: The Musical", a play based on the song composed by Kurousa-P.

Alongside her position in Team B, she gained a concurrency with NMB48's Team N on November 3, leading to her first original unit song entitled "Onew no Uwabaki" during Team N's first original stage, N3 "Koko ni Datte Tenshi wa Iru"—which began on November 19. During that same year, she ranked 57th in AKB48's 32nd Single General Election with 12,616 votes.

On February 24, 2014, Ichikawa was transferred permanently to NMB48's Team BII. On March, she was appointed the Lemon Ambassador for Hiroshima Prefecture.

On January 19, 2018, Ichikawa announced her graduation. Her graduation ceremony was held on April 3, 2018, had her final handshake on April 30, 2018, and graduated on May 1, 2018.

== Discography ==
=== AKB48 ===
Year	No.	Title	Role	Notes
2010
2010	19	"Chance no Junban"	B-side	"Fruits Snow" (as Team Kenkyuusei)
2011	20	"Sakura no Ki ni Narō"	B-side	"Ougon Center" (as Team Kenkyuusei)
2011	21	"Everyday, Katyusha"	B-sides	"Yankee Soul" and "Anti" (the latter as Team Kenkyuusei)
2011	22	"Flying Get"	B-sides	"Dakishimecha Ikenai" (as Under Girls) and "Seishun to Kizukanai Mama"
2011	23	"Kaze wa Fuiteiru"	B-sides	"Kimi no Senaka" (as Under Girls) and "Tsubomitachi" (as Team 4 + Research Students)
2011	24	"Ue kara Mariko"	B-side	"Hashire! Penguin" (as Team 4)
2012	25	"Give Me Five!"	B-side	"NEW SHIP" (as Special Girls A)
2012	26	"Manatsu no Sounds Good!"	A-side	
2012	27	"Gingham Check"	B-side	"Show Fight!" (as Future Girls)
2012	28	"Uza"	B-sides	"Tsugi no Season" (as Under Girls) and "Seigi no Mikata Janai Hero" (as Team B)
2012	29	"Eien Pressure"	B-side	"Eien Yori Tsuzuku You ni" (as OKL48)
2013	30	"So Long!"	B-side	"Soko de Inu no Unchi Funjau ka ne?" (as Team B)
2013	31	"Sayonara Crawl"	B-side	"Romance Kenjuu" (as Team B)
2013	32	"Koi Suru Fortune Cookie"	B-side	"Suitei Marmalade" (as Future Girls)
2013	33	"Heart Electric"	B-sides	"Kaisoku to Doutai Shiryoku" (as Under Girls) and "Tiny T-shirt" (as Team B)
2013	34	"Suzukake no Ki no Michi de "Kimi no Hohoemi o Yume ni Miru" to Itte Shimattara Bokutachi no Kankei wa Dō Kawatte Shimau no ka, Bokunari ni Nan-nichi ka Kangaeta Ue de no Yaya Kihazukashii Ketsuron no Yō na Mono"	B-sides	"Mosh&Drive" and "Kimi to Deatte Boku wa Kawatta" (as NMB48)
2014	35	"Mae Shika Mukanee"	B-sides	"Himitsu no Diary" (as NMB48)
2014	36	"Labrador Retriever"	A-sides	
2014	37	"Kokoro no Placard"	Future Girls	Sang "Seikaku ga Warui Onna no Ko" instead.
2014	38	"Kibōteki Refrain"	B-Side	Sang "Utaitai".
2015	39	"Green Flash"	B-side	Sang "Punkish"

=== NMB48 ===
Year	No.	Title	Role	Notes
2013	7	"Bokura no Eureka"	A-side, Akagumi	"Bokura no Eureka" (as Senbatsu) and "Yaban na Soft Cream" (as Akagumi)
2013	8	"Kamonegix"	A-side	
2014	9	"Takane no Ringo"	A-side	
2014	10	"Rashikunai"	A-side	Also sang "Star ni Nante Naritakunai"
2015	11	"Don't Look Back! (NMB48 song)"	A-side	Also sang "Romantic Snow"

== Appearances ==
=== Stage units ===
Team Kenkyuusei Stage "Theatre no Megami" (シアターの女神)

1. "Candy" (キャンディー)
2. "Hatsukoi yo Konnichiwa" (初恋よ こんにちは)

Team B 5th Stage "Theatre no Megami" (シアターの女神)

1. "Romance Kakurenbo" (ロマンスかくれんぼ)
2. "Candy" (キャンディー) (Yuka Masuda's Understudy)

Team K 6th Stage "RESET"

1. "Lemon no Toshigoro" (檸檬の年頃)
2. "Gyakuten Oujisama" (逆転王子様) (Minami Minegishi's Understudy)

Team A 6th Stage "Mokugekisha" (目撃者)

1. "Miniskirt no Yousei" (ミニスカートの妖精)
2. "Hoshi no Mukougawa" (☆の向こう側) (Aika Oota's Understudy)

Team 4 1st Stage "Boku no Taiyou" (僕の太陽)

1. "Idol Nante Yobanaide" (アイドルなんて呼ばないで)

Team B Waiting Stage "Waiting Stage" (ウェイティング公演)

1. "Kimi no C/W" (君のC／W)

Team N 1st Stage "Dareka no Tame ni Revival" (誰かのために リバイバル)

1. "Rider" (ライダー)

Team N 3rd Stage "Koko ni Datte Tenshi wa Iru" (ここにだって天使はいる)

1. "ONEW no Uwabaki" (おNEWの上履き)
2. "Hajimete no Hoshi" (初めての星)
3. "100nen Saki Demo" (100年先でも)

=== Movie ===
- Tears of Kitty (子猫の涙) (2008)
- Gekijōban Shiritsu Bakaleya Kōkō (劇場版 私立バカレア高校) (2012) - Tachibana Nanami

=== Drama ===
- Majisuka Gakuen 2 (マジすか学園2) (2011) - Lemon
- Hanazakari no Kimitachi e: Ikemen Paradise 2011 (花ざかりの君たちへ〜イケメン☆パラダイス〜2011) (2011) - Amagasaki Kanna
- Saba Doll (さばドル) (2012) - Herself
- Majiuska Gakuen 3 (マジすか学園3) (2012) - Sudachi
- Majisuka Gakuen 4 (マジすか学園4) (2015) - Lemon

=== Variety ===
- Ariyoshi AKB Republic (有吉AKB共和国) (2010–2011)
- AKBingo! (2011- )
- AKB Nemōsu TV Special 〜Mogitate Kenkyuusei in Guam〜 (AKBネ申テレビスペシャル〜もぎたて研究生 in グアム〜) (2011)
- AKB Nemōsu TV Season7 (AKBネ申テレビシーズン7) (2011)
- AKB Nemōsu TV Season8 (AKBネ申テレビシーズン8) (2011)
- AKB48 Konto 'Bimyo~ (AKB48コント「びみょ〜」) (2011)
- Shūkan AKB (週刊AKB) (2011–2012)
- Naruhodo! High School (なるほど!ハイスクール) (2011–2012)
- WaiWai Gachi GOLF (わいわいガチGOLF) (2012)
- AKB Kousagi Doujo (AKB子兎道場) (2012- )
- HaKaTa Hyakkaten Season 2 (HaKaTa百貨店 2号館) (2013)
- AKB Tourism Ambassador (AKB観光大使) (2014)
- NMB to Manabukun (NMBとまなぶくん) (2014– )

=== Radio ===
- AKB48 Konya wa Kaeranai (AKB48 今夜は帰らない…) (2011–present, CBC Radio)
- Listen? 〜Live 4 Life〜 (リッスン? 〜Live 4 Life〜) (2013–present, JOQR-AM)

=== Musical ===
- Senbonzakura (千本桜) (2013, Ginza Hakuhinkan Theatre) - Kagamine Rin
