= Momoka Kinoshita =

Japanese footballer

Personal information
- Date of birth: 2 March 2003 (age 23)
- Place of birth: Hokkaido, Japan
- Height: 1.63 m (5 ft 4 in)
- Position: Midfielder

Team information
- Current team: NTV Tokyo Verdy Beleza
- Number: 24

Youth career
- Omiya Nisshin SS
- Yonoue Ochiai SSS

Senior career*
Years	Team	Apps	(Gls)
2016–2023	NTV Tokyo Verdy Beleza	18	(2)
2024-	FC Olympia		(0)

International career
2017	Japan U16	8	(2)
2018	Japan U17	7	(1)
2021	Japan	4	(1)
- * Club domestic league appearances and goals as of 8 April 2021

Momoka Kinoshita (木下 桃香, Kinoshita Momoka; born 2 March 2003) is a Japanese footballer currently playing as a midfielder, for FC Olympia

== Career statistics ==
=== Club ===
Club	Season	League			National Cup		League Cup		Other		Total	
Club	Season	Division	Apps	Goals	Apps	Goals	Apps	Goals	Apps	Goals	Apps	Goals
NTV Tokyo Verdy Beleza	2016	Nadeshiko League	0	0	0	0	1 (Note: Appearances in the Nadeshiko League Cup)	0	0	0	1	0
NTV Tokyo Verdy Beleza	2017	Nadeshiko League	0	0	0	0	3	0	0	0	3	0
NTV Tokyo Verdy Beleza	2018	Nadeshiko League	0	0	0	0	4	0	0	0	4	0
NTV Tokyo Verdy Beleza	2019	Nadeshiko League	0	0	0	0	0	0	0	0	0	0
NTV Tokyo Verdy Beleza	2020	Nadeshiko League	18	2	5 (Note: Appearances in the Empress's Cup)	1	0	0	0	0	23	3
NTV Tokyo Verdy Beleza	2021–22	WE League	0	0	0	0	0	0	0	0	0	0
Career total			18	2	5	1	8	0	0	0	31	3

=== International ===
As of matches played 27 March 2023.

== Career statistics ==
=== International ===
National Team	Year	Apps	Goals
Japan
Japan	2021	4	1
Total		4	1

=== International goals ===
Scores and results list Japan's goal tally first.

No	Date	Venue	Opponent	Score	Result	Competition
1.	13 June 2021	Kanseki Stadium Tochigi, Utsunomiya, Tochigi, Japan	Mexico	4–1	5–1	Friendly
