= Nana Yamada =

Japanese singer

Nana Yamada 山田 菜々
- Also known as: Nana
- Born: Nana Nakayama (中山 菜々); 3 April 1992 (age 33)
- Origin: Osaka Prefecture, Japan
- Genres: J-pop
- Occupation(s): Idol, singer
- Years active: 2006–2021
- Labels: Showtitle
- Formerly of: NMB48, SKE48, Hello! Project

Nana Nakayama (中山 菜々, Nakayama Nana), known professionally as Nana Yamada (山田 菜々, Yamada Nana; born 3 April 1992 in Osaka Prefecture) is a former member of the Japanese idol girl group NMB48. She was a member of NMB48's Team M. She graduated from the group on April 3, 2015. Her younger sister, Suzu Yamada (born Suzu Nakayama), is also a former member of NMB48, and her younger brother, Yuma Nakayama, is an actor formerly represented by Starto Entertainment, now currently a freelancer.

== Biography ==
In 2005, Yamada passed Hello Project's Kansai auditions. She graduated from being a trainee member in April 2008 and debuted under the group "SI☆NA" with 3 other ex-trainees from Hello Project. In July 2009, she graduated from "SI☆NA".

Yamada later passed NMB48's 1st generation auditions in September 2010. Her audition song was "Shoujo A" by Akina Nakamori. Her debut was on October 9, 2010. Her stage debut was on January 1, 2011. In March 2011, she was selected to Team N. Her first NMB48 Senbatsu was for Zetsumetsu Kurokami Shōjo.

In the 2012 AKB48 general elections, Yamada ranked for the first time, placing 46th with 6,683 votes.

In April 2013, during NMB48's Request Hour Setlist Best 30, Yamada was transferred to Team M. She started activities as a Team M member in May 2013. In the 2013 general elections, her rank improved and she placed 28th with 23,950 votes.

In February 2014, during AKB48's Group Shuffle, Yamada was appointed the captain of Team M and also started holding a concurrent position in SKE48's Team KII. In the 2014 general elections, she placed 29th with 23,299 votes.

In October 2014, Yamada announced her graduation during NMB48's 4th Anniversary Live. She graduated on her birthday, April 3, 2015.

On March 31, 2021, Yamada retired from entertainment industry.

== Discography ==
=== NMB48 singles ===
Year	No.	Title	Role	Notes
2011	1	"Zetsumetsu Kurokami Shōjo"	A-side	Debut with NMB48 Team N. Sang on "Seishun no Lap Time", "Mikazuki no Senaka" and "Boku ga Maketa Natsu" with Shirogumi
2011	2	"Oh My God!"	A-side, center	Sang on "Boku wa Matteru", "Kesshou" with Shirogumi and "Uso no Tenbin" with NMB Seven.
2012	3	"Junjō U-19"	A-side	Sang on "Doryoku no Shizuku" with Shirogumi and "Renai no Speed" with NMB Seven
2012	4	"Nagiichi"	A-side	Sang on "Boku ga Mou Sukoshi Daitan Nara" with Akagumi and "Hatsukoi no Yukue to Play Ball" with NMB Seven.
2012	5	"Virginity (song)"	A-side	Sang on "Mōsō Girlfriend" and "Bokura no Regatta" with Shirogumi.
2012	6	"Kitagawa Kenji"	A-side	Sang on "Renai Higaitodoke"
2013	7	"Bokura no Eureka"	A-side	Sang on "Todokekana Soude Todoku Mono" and "Okuba" as Shirogumi
2013	8	"Kamonegix"	A-side	Sang on "Doshaburi no Seishun no Naka de" as Shirogumi.
2014	9	"Takane no Ringo"	A-side	Sang on "Mizukiri"
2014	10	"Rashikunai"	A-side	Sang on "Tomodachi" and "Migi ni Shiteru Ring" as Team M
2015	11	"Don't look back!"	A-side, center	Yamada's last single with NMB48. Also sang "Minna, Daisuki" which was also her graduation song.

=== SKE48 singles ===
Year	No.	Title	Role	Notes
2014	15	"Bukiyō Taiyō"	A-side	Also sang on "Sayonara Kinou no Jibun" as Team KII
2014	16	"12 Gatsu no Kangaroo"	A-side	Also sang on "DA DA Machine Gun" as Team KII

=== AKB48 singles ===
Year	No.	Title	Role	Notes
2011	21	"Everyday, Katyusha"	B-side	Sang on "Hito no Chikara"
2012	27	"Gingham Check"	B-side	Ranked 46th in 2012 General Election. Sang on "Doremifa Onchi"
2012	28	"Uza"	B-side	Sang on "Tsugi no Season"
2012	29	"Eien Pressure"	B-side	Sang on "HA!"
2013	30	"So Long!"	B-side	Sang on "Waiting Room"
2013	31	"Sayonara Crawl"	A-side	First AKB48 A-side
2013	32	"Koi Suru Fortune Cookie"	B-side	Ranked 28th in 2013 General Election. Sang on "Ai no Imi wo Kangaetemita"
2013	34	"Suzukake no Ki no Michi de "Kimi no Hohoemi o Yume ni Miru" to Itte Shimattara Bokutachi no Kankei wa Dō Kawatte Shimau no ka, Bokunari ni Nan-nichi ka Kangaeta Ue de no Yaya Kihazukashii Ketsuron no Yō na Mono"	B-side	Sang on "Kimi to Deatte Boku wa Kawatta"
2014	35	"Mae Shika Mukanee"	B-side	Sang on "KONJO"
2014	37	"Kokoro no Placard"	B-side	Ranked 29th in 2014 General Election. Sang on "Dareka ga Nageta Ball"
2014	38	"Kibouteki Refrain"	B-side	Sang on "Utaitai"
2015	39	"Green Flash"	B-side	Sang on "Punkish"

== Appearances ==
=== Stage Units ===
NMB48 Kenkyuusei Stage "Dareka no Tame ni"

1. "Shinkirou"
2. "Seifuku ga Jama wo Suru"

Team N 1st Stage "Dareka no Tame ni"

1. "Shinkirou"
2. "Seifuku ga Jama wo Suru"

Team N 2nd Stage "Seishun Girls"

1. "Kinjirareta Futari"
2. "Fushidara na Natsu"

Team M 1st Stage "Idol no Yoake"

1. "Kuchi Utsushi no Chocolate"

Team KII 3rd Stage "Ramune no Nomikata" (Revival)

1. "Manazashi, Sayonara"

Team M 2nd Stage "RESET"

1. "Kokoro no Hashi no Sofa"

=== Movies ===
- NMB48 Geinin! THE MOVIE Owarai Seishun Girls! (2013)
- Mustard Chocolate (2017)

=== Variety Shows ===
- AKBINGO!
- Shukan AKB
- AKB MOTOR CLUB

=== TV dramas ===
- Isharyō Bengoshi: Anata no Namida, Okane ni Kaemashō (NTV, 2014) as Sara Mizutani

=== Stages ===
- Taylor Burton: Ubawareta Hihō (Sōgetsu Hall, 2015)
- Super Danganronpa 2 The Stage: Sayonara Zetsubō Gakuen (Zepp Blue Theater Roppongi, 2015)
- Tokyo Ivonnu the 11th performance Antonín Dvorak Symphony No.9 From the New World (Square Ebara Hiratsuka Hall, 2016)

== Bibliography ==
=== Photobooks ===
- Yamada Nana 4+3=7: NMB48 Sotugyō Memorial Photobook (24 April 2015), Kobunsha, ISBN 9784334902025
