= Sae Murase =

Japanese singer

Sae Murase 村瀬 紗英
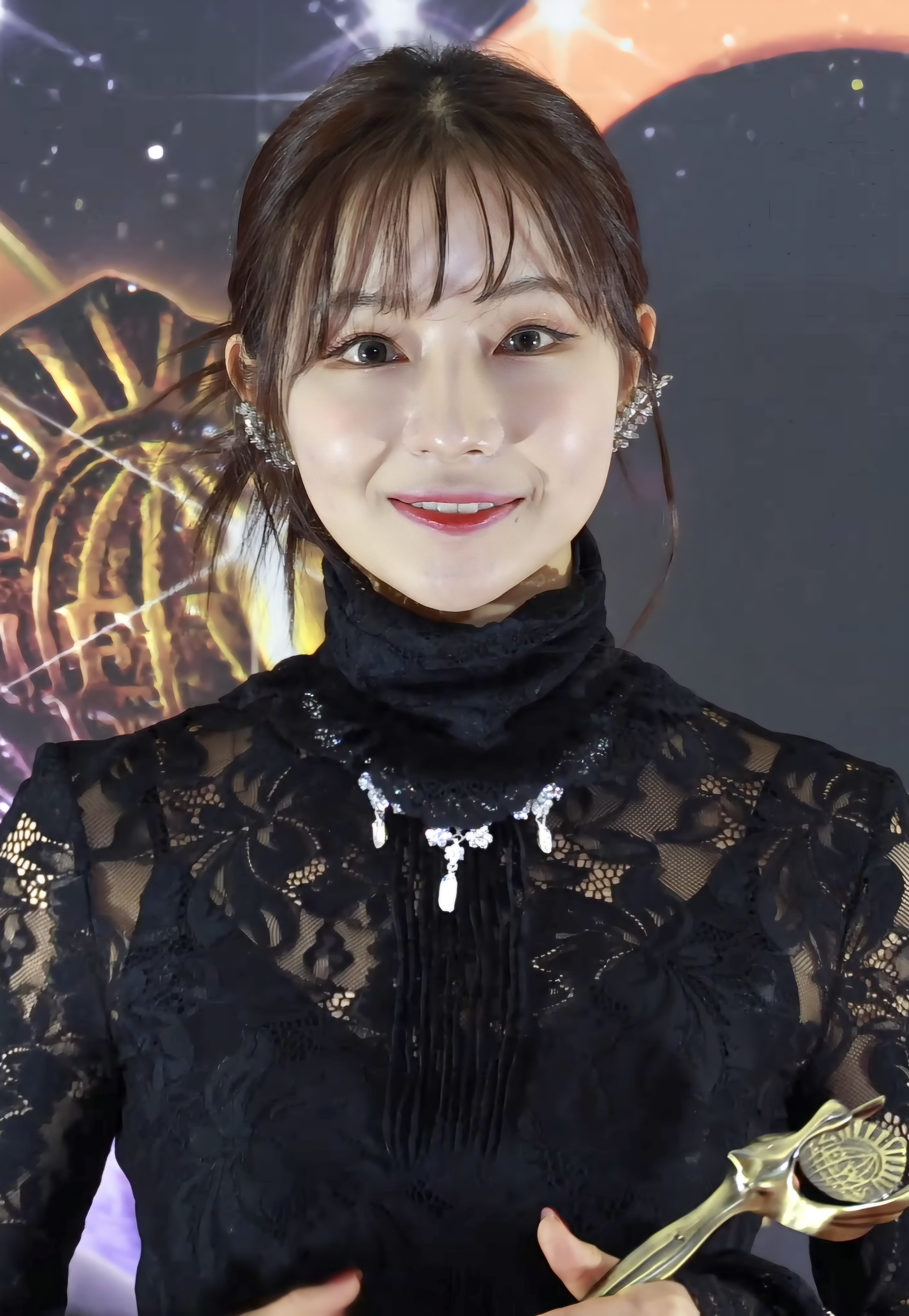
- Sae Murase in December 2024

Background information
- Also known as: Saepii
- Born: 30 March 1997 (age 29)
- Origin: Osaka Prefecture, Japan
- Genres: J-pop
- Occupations: Idol; singer
- Instruments: Vocals; guitar
- Years active: 2011–present
- Label: KYORAKU Yoshimoto Holdings

Sae Murase (村瀬 紗英, Murase Sae; born 30 March 1997 in Osaka Prefecture) is a Japanese idol. She is a former member of NMB48 and Team N.

== Biography ==
Murase passed NMB48's 2nd generation auditions in May 2011. Her debut was on June 5, 2011. Her stage debut was on August 13, 2011. In January 2012, she was selected to join Team M. Prior to joining NMB48, she had no experience in dancing, and remembering various things was tough but fun.

In September 2013, Murase was selected to be the center for the unit Namba Teppoutai Sono Shi (難波鉄砲隊其之四) in the single Kamonegix. In November 2013, she was selected to be in NMB48's Senbatsu for the coupling track in AKB48's single Suzukake Nanchara. In March 2014, she was first selected to join senbatsu for the single Takane no Ringo.

In June 2018, she and current members of AKB48 and their sister groups participated in the survival-reality show Produce 48. On Episode 11, she was eliminated in the third elimination round finishing at 22nd place.

On March 1, 2019, she was transferred to Team N.

On October 10, 2020, she announced her graduation from NMB48 at a concert at the NMB48 Theater.

== Discography ==
=== NMB48 singles ===
Year	No.	Title	Role	Notes
2011	2	"Oh My God!"	B-side	Sang on "Boku wa Matteru" and "Nandeyanen, Idol"
2012	3	"Junjō U-19"	B-side	Sang on "Baatari GO!"
2012	4	"Nagiichi"	B-side	Sang on "Rifujin Ball"
2012	5	"Virginity"	B-side	Sang on "Bokura no Regatta"
2012	6	"Kitagawa Kenji"	B-side	Sang on "In-Goal"
2013	7	"Bokura no Eureka"	B-side	Sang on "Hinadande wa Boku no Miryoku wa Ikinainda"
2013	8	"Kamonegix"	B-side	Sang on "Mou Hadashi ni Hanarenai"
2014	9	"Takane no Ringo"	A-side	First A-side.
2014	10	"Rashikunai"	A-side	Also sang on "Migi ni Shiteru Ring" as Team M
2015	11	"Don't look back!"	A-side	Also sang on "Heart Sakebu" as Team M
2015	12	"Dorian Shōnen"	A-side	Also sang on "Boku dake no Secret time" as Team M
2015	13	"Must be now"	B-side	Sang on "Kataomoi Yori mo Omoide wo..." and "Good-bye, Guitar" as Team M
2016	14	"Amagami Hime"	A-side	Also sang on "Koi wo Isoge" as Team M
2016	15	"Boku wa Inai"	A-side	Also sang on "Saigo no go Shakudama" as Team M
2016	16	"Boku Igai no Dareka"	A-side	Also sang on "Let it snow!" as Team BII
2017	17	"Warota People"	A-side	Also sang on "Futsuu no Mizu" as Team BII and "Which one"
2018	18	"Yokubomono"	A-side	Also sang on "Saji wo Nageru na!" as Team BII
2018	19	"Boku Datte naichau yo"	A-side	Also sang on "Shokumu Shitsumon"
2019	20	"Tokonoma Seiza Musume"	A-side	Also sang on "Amai Mousou", "Yake Bokkui", "Pink Iro no Sekai" and "2 ban-me no Door"
2019	21	"Bokō e Kaere!"	A-side	Also sang on "Boku Dake no Kimi de Ite Hoshii" and "Gattsuki Girls"
2019	22	"Hatsukoi Shijo Shugi"	A-side	Also sang on "Gomen Aisenai Nda"
2020	23	"Datte Datte Datte"	A-side	Also sang on "Ya" and "Imifu"

=== AKB48 singles ===
Year	No.	Title	Role	Notes
2012	27	"Gingham Check"	B-side	Sang on "Ano Hi no Fuurin"
2013	34	"Suzukake Nanchara"	B-side	Sang on "Kimi to Deatte Boku wa Kawatta"
2015	39	"Green Flash"	B-side	Sang on "Punkish"
2016	43	"Kimi wa Melody"	B-side	Sang on "Shigamitsuita Seishun"
2017	47	"Shoot Sign"	B-side	Sang on "Mayonaka no Tsuyogari"

== Appearances ==
=== Stage Units ===
NMB48 Kenkyuusei Stage "Party ga Hajimaru yo"

1. "Kiss wa Dame yo"

Team M 1st Stage "Idol no Yoake"

1. "Zannen Shoujo"

Team M 2nd Stage "RESET"

1. "Kokoro no Hashi no Sofa"

Team BII 4th Stage "Renai Kinshi Jourei"

1. "Heart Gata Virus"
