= Akari Yoshida =

Japanese tarento and model

- 吉田 朱里
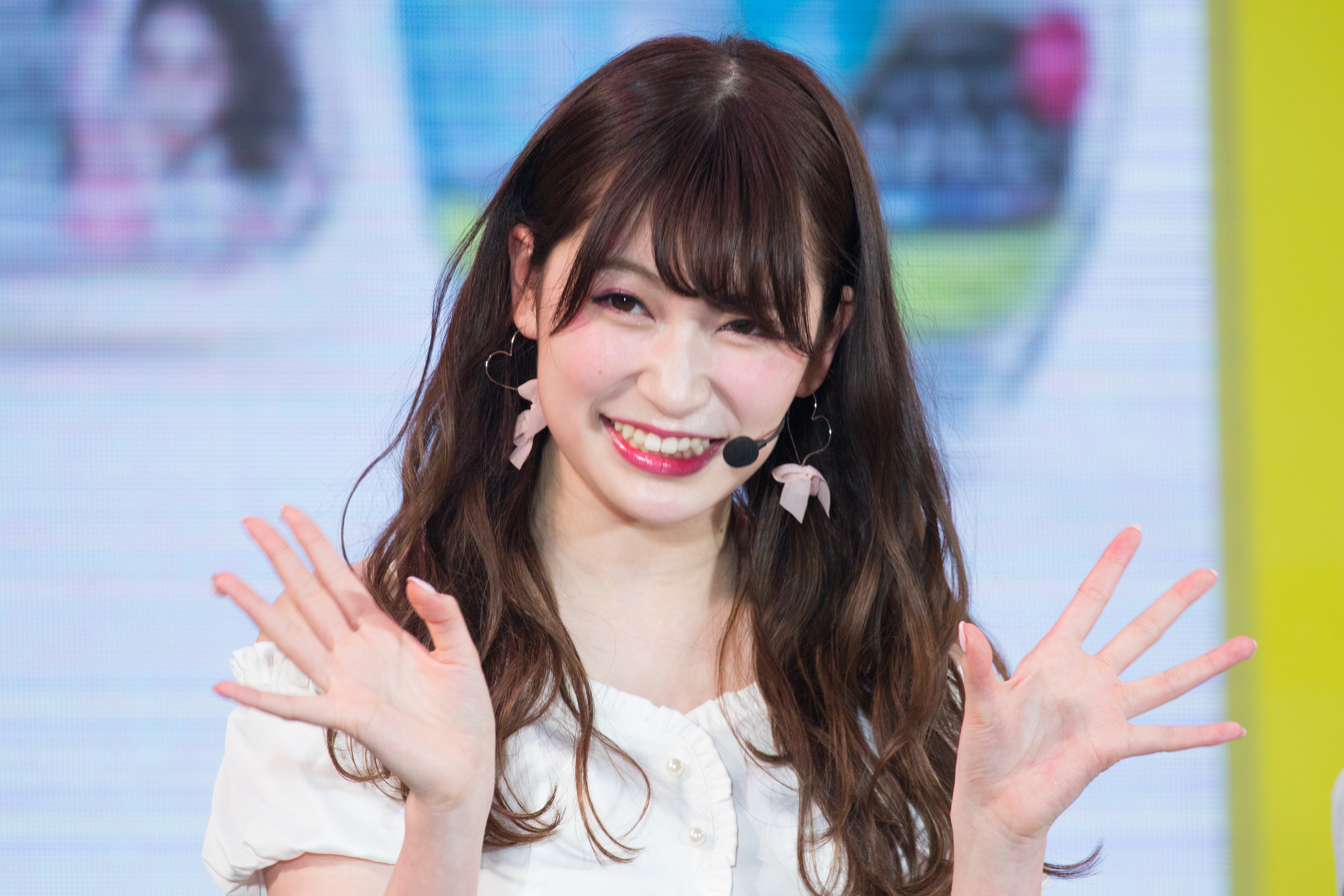
- Born: August 16, 1996 (age 30); Osaka Prefecture, Japan
- Other name: Akarin (アカリン)
- Occupations: Television personality; model; youtuber
- Years active: 2020–present
- Agent: Yoshimoto Kogyo
- Height: 165.5 cm (5 ft 5 in)
- Spouse: Unknown (m. 2024)
- Children: 1
- Musical career
- Genre: J-pop
- Instrument: Vocals
- Years active: 2010–2020
- Label: KYORAKU Yoshimoto Holdings
- Formerly of: NMB48

YouTube information
- Channel: YoshidaAkari
- Years active: 2016–present
- Genre: Vlog
- Subscribers: 990k
- Views: 387 million
- Last updated: 4 Sept, 2024

Akari Yoshida (吉田 朱里, Yoshida Akari; born 16 August 1996 in Osaka Prefecture) is a Japanese YouTuber, television personality, fashion model, and former member of the Japanese idol girl group NMB48.

She is affiliated with Yoshimoto Kogyo. During her time at NMB48, she was affiliated with Showtitle.

== Career ==
Yoshida passed NMB48's 1st generation auditions in September 2010. Her audition song was Tomorrow by Okamoto Mayo. Her debut was on October 9, 2010. Her stage debut was on January 1, 2011. In March 2011, she was selected to Team N. Her first NMB48 Senbatsu was the single Zetsumetsu Kurokami Shōjo.

In September 2011, Yoshida was suspended from activities due to a scandal. Her activities resumed in February 2012.

In the 2013 general elections, Yoshida ranked for the first time, placing 50th with 14,684 votes. In 2014, her ranked dropped and she placed 72nd with 10,982 votes.

On February 2, 2016, she opened her YouTube channel and became active as a YouTuber.

In the 2017 general elections, Yoshida placed 16th with 35,540 votes and entered the Senbatsu in AKB48 49th single.

In 2018, she became the model for women's fashion magazine Ray issued by Shufonotomo.

On August 16, 2020, her 24th birthday, she announced that she will be graduating from NMB48 during an event at the NMB48 theater. Her graduation concert, "Sayonara Pink, Sayonara Idol", was held at the Osaka-jō Hall on October 24. During that event, Yoshida announced that she is writing a memoir about her 10 years in NMB48. She was supposed to graduate from NMB48 on November 30, but that event was suspended due to her poor health, though she tested negative for COVID-19. The graduation performance was eventually rescheduled to December 21.

On January 16, 2021, Yoshida opened her official fan club, "Akarin Room Share" (アカリンルームシェア).

== Personal life ==
On April 6, 2024, she announced her marriage to a non-celebrity man.

== Discography ==
=== NMB48 singles ===
Year	No.	Title	Role	Notes
2011	1	"Zetsumetsu Kurokami Shōjo"	A-side	Debut with NMB48 Team N. Also sang on "Seishun no Lap Time", "Mikazuki no Senaka" and "Mattemashita, Shingakki" with Akagumi
2012	4	"Nagiichi"	A-side	Also sang on "Boku ga Mou Sukoshi Daitan Nara" with Akagumi
2012	5	"Virginity"	A-side	Also sang on "Mōsō Girlfriend" and "Sonzai Shitenai Mono" with Akagumi
2012	6	"Kitagawa Kenji"	A-side	Also sang on "In-Goal" and "Hoshizora no Caravan" with Shirogumi
2013	7	"Bokura no Eureka"	A-side	Also sang on "Todokekana Soude Todoku Mono"
2013	8	"Kamonegix"	A-side	
2014	9	"Takane no Ringo"	A-side	
2014	10	"Rashikunai"	A-side	Also sang on "Kyusen Kyotei" as Team N.
2015	11	"Don't look back!"	A-side	Also sang on "Renai Petenshi" as Team N. Sang on "Sotsugyō Ryokō" as NMB48's 1st generation.
2015	12	"Dorian Shōnen"	A-side	Also sang on "Inochi no Heso" as Team N.
2015	13	"Must be now"	B-side	Did not sing on title track; Sang on "Yume ni Iro ga nai riyū" as Team N and "Kataomoi Yori mo Omoide wo...".
2016	14	"Amagami Hime"	A-side	Also sang on "Hakanai Monogatari" as Team N.
2016	15	"Boku wa Inai"	A-side	Also sang on "Sora Kara Ai ga Futte Kuru" as Team N.
2016	16	"Boku Igai no Dareka"	A-side	Also sang on "Tochuu Gesha" and "Koi wa Sainan" as Team M.
2017	17	"Warota People"	A-side	Also sang on "Hontou no Jibun no Kyokaisen" as Team M and "Which one" as Queentet.
2018	18	"Yokubomono"	A-side	Also sang on "Yojijukugo Girls" as Team M and "Thinking time" as Solo Track.
2018	19	"Boku Datte naichau yo"	A-side	Also sang on "True Purpose" as Team M.
2019	20	"Tokonoma Seiza Musume"	A-side	Also sang on "Amai Mousou" as Queentet, "Pink Iro no Sekai", "2 ban-me no Door" and "Yake Bokkui" as Team N.
2019	21	"Bokou e Kaere!"	A-side	Also sang on "Boku Dake no Kimi de Ite Hoshii" as Queentet and "Gattsuki Girls" as Team N.
2019	22	"Hatsukoi Shijo Shugi"	A-side	Also sang on "Gomen Aisenainda" as Team N.
2020	23	"Datte Datte Datte"	A-side	Also sang on "Hate" as Team N.
2020	24	"Koi Nanka No thank you!"	A-side (Center)	Last single to participate. Also sang on "Dancing High" as Team N and "Ichiban Suki na Hana" which is her graduation song.

=== NMB48 Albums ===
Teppen Tottande!

- "Teppen Tottande!"
- "12/31"
- "Lily" / Team N

Sekai no Chuushin wa Osaka ya ~Namba Jichiku~

- "Ibiza girl"
- ""Seito Techo no Shashin wa Ki ni Haittenai" no Hoshoku"
- "Densha wo Oriru" / Team N

Namba Ai (Ima, Omou Koto)

- "Masaka Singapore"
- "Namba Ai"

=== AKB48 singles ===
Year	No.	Title	Role	Notes
2012	27	"Gingham Check"	B-side	Sang on "Ano Hi no Fuurin"
2012	29	"Eien Pressure"	B-side	Sang on "HA!" as NMB48.
2013	31	"Sayonara Crawl"	B-side	Sang on "Bara no Kajitsu"
2013	32	"Koi Suru Fortune Cookie"	B-side, Future Girls	Ranked 50th in 2013 General Election. Sang on "Suitei Marmalade"
2013	34	"Suzukake no Ki no Michi de "Kimi no Hohoemi o Yume ni Miru" to Itte Shimattara Bokutachi no Kankei wa Dō Kawatte Shimau no ka, Bokunari ni Nan-nichi ka Kangaeta Ue de no Yaya Kihazukashii Ketsuron no Yō na Mono"	B-side	Sang on "Kimi to Deatte Boku wa Kawatta" as NMB48.
2014	35	"Mae Shika Mukanee"	B-side	Sang on "Kimi no Uso wo Shitteita"
2014	37	"Kokoro no Placard"	B-side, Upcoming Girls	Ranked 72nd in 2014 General Election. Sang on "Chewing Gum no Aji ga Nakunaru made"
2014	38	"Kibouteki Refrain"	B-side	Sang on "Ambulance"
2015	39	"Green Flash"	B-side	Sang on "Punkish" as NMB48.
2015	41	"Halloween Night"	B-side, Future Girls	Ranked 64th in 2015 General Election. Sang on "Kimi ni Wedding Dress wo..."
2016	43	"Kimi wa Melody"	B-side	Sang on "Shigamitsuita Seishun" as NMB48.
2016	45	"LOVE TRIP / Shiawase wo Wakenasai"	B-side, Upcoming Girls	Ranked 77th in 2016 General Election. Sang on "2016nen no Invitation"
2017	47	"Shoot Sign"	A-side	First AKB48 A-side. Also sang on "Mayonaka no Tsuyogari" as NMB48.
2017	48	"Negaigoto no Mochigusare"	A-side	Also sang on "Anogoro no Gohyaku Yen Dama"
2017	49	"#SukiNanda"	A-side	Ranked 16th in 2017 General Election.
2017	50	"11gatsu no Anklet"	A-side	
2018	51	"Jabaja"	B-side	Sang on "Hetawōtsu" as NMB48.
2018	52	"Teacher Teacher"	A-side	
2018	53	"Sentimental Train"	A-side	Ranked 14th in 2018 General Election.
2018	54	"No Way Man"	B-side	Sang on "Soredemo Kanojo wa"
2019	55	"Jiwaru Days"	A-side	
2019	56	"Sustainable"	A-side	
2020	57	"Shitsuren, Arigatō"	A-side	Last single to participate. Also Sang on "Aisuru Hito"

=== AKB48 Albums ===
Koko ni Ita Koto

- "Koko ni Ita Koto"

1830m

- "Aozora yo Sabishikunai Ka?"

Koko ga Rhodes da, Koko de Tobe!

- "Bokutachi no Ideology"

Bokutachi wa, Ano Hi no Yoake wo Shitteiru

- "Tengoku no Kakurega"
