= Rika Kishino =

Japanese singer and actress

Rika Kishino 岸野 里香
- Born: 4 June 1994 (age 32); Hyōgo Prefecture, Japan
- Genres: J-pop; pop rock
- Occupations: Singer; idol
- Years active: 2010–16 (NMB48); 2017–18 (Over The Top)
- Labels: laugh out loud! records (NMB48); Dreamusic (Over The Top)

Rika Kishino (岸野 里香, Kishino Rika; born 4 June 1994) is a Japanese singer, actress, model and tarento who was the vocalist of the now-disbanded rock band Over The Top and former member of the idol group NMB48. She was born in Hyōgo Prefecture.

== Biography ==
On 20 September 2010, she passed the NMB48 Opening Member Audition (total number of entries: 7,256, final successful candidates: 26). On 9 October, at the Visit Zoo Campaign Support Project AKB 48 Tokyo Fall Festival supported by NTT Plala, the 26 people who became the NMB48 first-year Kenkyūsei were shown and started activities.

On 1 January 2011, in the NMB48 1-Kisei: Dareka no tame ni performance started at Namba's NMB48 Theater in Osaka, she made her debut in a theatrical performance as one of the sixteen selected members. On 10 March 2011, she and the other NMB48 first-year Kenkyūsei were elected as members of Team N as one out of the 16 among 25 names.

On 13 January 2012, she participated in the name "Rika Kishino" at the R-1 Grand Prix 2012 and passed to the second round of 12 February, but was later eliminated (another member of NMB48, Mayu Ogasawara (then) was withdrawn from third round).

For the AKB48 32nd Single Senbatsu Sō Senkyo voting that was carried out from May to June 2013, she informed her intention not to run on her own blog.

In the AKB48 45th Single Senbatsu Sō Senkyo held from May to June 2016, she was ranked 66th and was selected as the Upcoming Girls. On 27 August, at the NMB48 Request Hour Set List Best 235 2016 held at the World Memorial Hall, she announced that she would graduate from NMB48 and hold a graduation performance at the NMB48 Theater on 15 October.

On 20 February 2017, it was announced that Kishino formed the vocal rock band "Over The Top" and made a major debut in the summer.

On 5 January 2018, she announced that she was married to Taito Nakahigashi of B.League Nagoya Diamond Dolphins and was pregnant and later announced that her band would be dissolved.

== Personal life ==
- She is nicknamed Rikanyan (りかにゃん), in which it was not decided easily, and Aina Fukumoto (currently: Yoshimoto Shinkigeki) as a synchronised student decided "Rikanyan" as "together with the Nyannyan Combination." She call that to Fukumoto as "Aikata." In sync, there are two more members with graduates Ayaka Mori as "Anyan" and Ayame Hikawa "Ayanyan" and "Nyan", and the four of them were called "Nyannyan's."
- Her catchphrase is "sideways when riding an elevator, sideways looking at group pictures, sideways feeling~, everyone likes shoulder width~", and once was "Good subjects are physical education, music, mathematics, society, but after all, Rika (science)~~!"
- She is left handed, however, her ball type events are right handed.
- Her favourite words are "luck is out of competence."
- As an episode expressing personality, she is chosen as "Hyōkin-ō" or "Otona Ō" by voting within the NMB48 members, not only is her behaviour interesting, but also calm.
- Her merits are positive.
- When she was in elementary school, she learned jazz dance for two years.
- Her favourite foods are red caviar, eel, mozuku, okra, yam, yakiniku, and ice cream. Her future dreams are becoming a singer and actress.
- Her hobbies are visiting drugstores, sports, rock bathing, shopping, and karaoke.
- Her special skills are snowboarding and basketball. By the way, she started snowboarding at the age of five, and when she was four years, she was going to ski at the skiing place instead of snowboarding, but as soon as she started skiing she was disliked and thrown out, and changed to sledding but after watching that her father was doing snowboarding, she stood on a sled and imitated her father's snowboarding, and after a year she challenged snowboarding in earnest.
- She was unveiled a single player at the 'R-1 Grand Prix 2012.' She showed her neta by placing sunglasses on her perming wigs and playing an aunt who shoplifts at a supermarket.
- Her registration qualification is a driver's license.

=== NMB48 ===
- She entered NMB48 because of her mother's recommendation. The song that she sang at the time of her audition was Ayumi Hamasaki's "Blue Bird."
- Her closest members are Aina Fukumoto, Kei Jonishi, Riho Kotani, Haruna Kinoshita, and Rina Kondo.
- In the AKB48 group department activities on Google+, she belonged to the cuisine division.

== Participating songs with NMB48 ==
=== Single-selected songs ===
- Zetsumetsu Kurokami Shōjo
  - Seishun no Lap Time
  - Boku ga Maketa Natsu – part of Shiro-gumi
  - Mikazuki no Senaka
- Oh My God!
  - Boku wa Matteru
  - Kesshō – part of Shiro-gumi
- Junjō U-19
  - Doryoku no Shizuku – part of Shiro-gumi
- Included in "Nagiichi"
  - Rifujin Ball – part of Under Girls
  - Saigo no Catharsis – part of Shiro-gumi
- Virginity
  - Mōsō Girlfriend
- Kitagawa Kenji
  - In Goal
- Included in "Bokura no Eureka"
  - Okuba – part of Shiro-gumi
- Included in "Kamonegikkusu"
  - Doshaburi no Seishun no Naka de – part of Shiro-gumi
- Included in "Takane no Ringo"
  - Prom no Koibito – part of Shiro-gumi
- Included in "Rashikunai"
  - Kyūsen Kyōtei – part of Team N
- Included in "Don't Look Back!"
  - Sotsugyō Ryokō
  - Renai Petenshi – part of Team N
- Included in "Dorian Shōnen"
  - Inochi no heso – part of Team N
- Must be now
  - Yume ni Iro ga nai Riyū – part of Team N
  - Orera to wa
- Included in "Amagami Hime"
  - Hakanai Monogatari – part of Team N
- Boku wa Inai
  - Sora kara Ai ga Futte Kuru – part of Team N

Part of AKB48

- Included in "Gingham Check"
  - Ano Hi no Fūrin – part of Waiting Girls
- Included in "Love Trip / Shiawase o Wakenasai"
  - 2016-Nen no Invitation – part of Upcoming Girls

=== Album-selected songs ===
Part of NMB48

- Included in Teppen Tottande!
  - Teppen Tottande!
  - Lily – part of Team N
- Included in Sekai no Chuushin wa Osaka ya ~Namba Jichiku~
  - Densha o Oriru – part of Team N

Part of AKB48

- Included in Koko ni Ita Koto
  - Koko ni Ita Koto
- Included in 1830m
  - Aozora yo Sabishikunai ka?

=== Theatre performance unit songs ===
Team N 1st Stage: Dareka no tame ni performance

- Bird
- Seifuku ga Jama o suru

Team N 2nd Stage: Seishun Girls performance

- Blue rose

Team N 3rd Stage: Koko ni datte Tenshi wa iru performance

- Kono Sekai ga Yuki no Naka ni Umoreru Mae ni (centre)

Team N 4th Stage: Koko ni datte Tenshi wa iru performance

- Kono Sekai ga Yuki no Naka ni Umoreru Mae ni (centre)

== Appearances ==
=== Television ===
- Star Hime Sagashi Tarō "NMB48 Project" (11 Sep 2010 – 24 Sep 2011, TX)
- Docking48 (19 Apr 2011 – 17 Apr 2012, 7 Aug 2012 – 26 Mar 2013, KTV)
- Naniwa Nadeshiko (12 Jul – 28 Dec 2011, NTV)
- Hayarin Monroe (23 Apr – 17 Sep 2012, KTV)
- Aruaru YY TV (3 Jul, 17 Sep 2012, TVQ)
- Fumie no Rakugo Sōsei-ki (14 Jul 2012, 5 Jan, 9 Feb, 10 Aug 2013, 1 Jan 2014, NHK Osaka)
- NMB Geinin! (14 Aug, 11 Sep 2012, NTV)
  - NMB Geinin!!!3 (5 Jul – 20 Sep 2014, NTV)
- Tenshin Ranman Sekirara-ko –Renpai Joshi no tame no Shiawase Ōen Variety– (12 Jan – 30 Mar 2013, ABC)
- Black Million (6 Apr 2013 – 29 Mar 2014, TX)
- NMB48 to Manabu-kun (11 Apr 2013 –, KTV)
- NMB48 no Naisho de Genkai Toppa! (23 Apr 2014 –, BS SkyPerfecTV!)
- Wakeari! Red Zone (12 Jun 2014 –, YTV) assistant
- NMB48 works part-time so "Meccha" (12 Aug, 14 Oct 2014, KTV)
- Jinnai Kenkoba Nakagawa-ya! Arafō Dōki Singapore e Iku (27 Dec 2014, KTV)
- AKB Nemōsu TV (Family Gekijo)
  - Season20 (22 Nov 2015)

=== Radio ===
- NMB48 Rika to Dareka no Girls Talk (6 Apr 2013 – 9 Oct 2016, Radio Kansai) (Note: The programme was called NMB48 Rika to Ayaka no Girls Talk until December 2014.)
- Rika Kishino to Kimiya Mikami no Totte Oki no Kobe (9 Oct – 25 Dec 2016, Radio Kansai)
- 60Try-bu (6 Oct 2017 – 5 Jan 2018, Radio Nippon; Friday in charge)

=== Films ===
- NMB48 Geinin! The Movie: Owarai Seishun Girls (1 Aug 2013, Yoshimoto Creative Agency)

=== Stage ===
- Ai no Uta o Utaou (10 Jan – 2 Feb 2014, Tokyu Theater Orb—Orix Theater)

=== Advertisements ===
- Ezaki Glico Breo (Mar 2011)

== Books ==
=== Magazine serialisations ===
- Gekkan Entame (30 Mar 2012 – 30 Mar 2013, Tokuma Shoten) – "Naniwa Onna no Owarai Shugyō-dō," jointly serialised with Mayu Ogasawara.
