= Shu Yabushita =

Shu Yabushita 薮下 柊
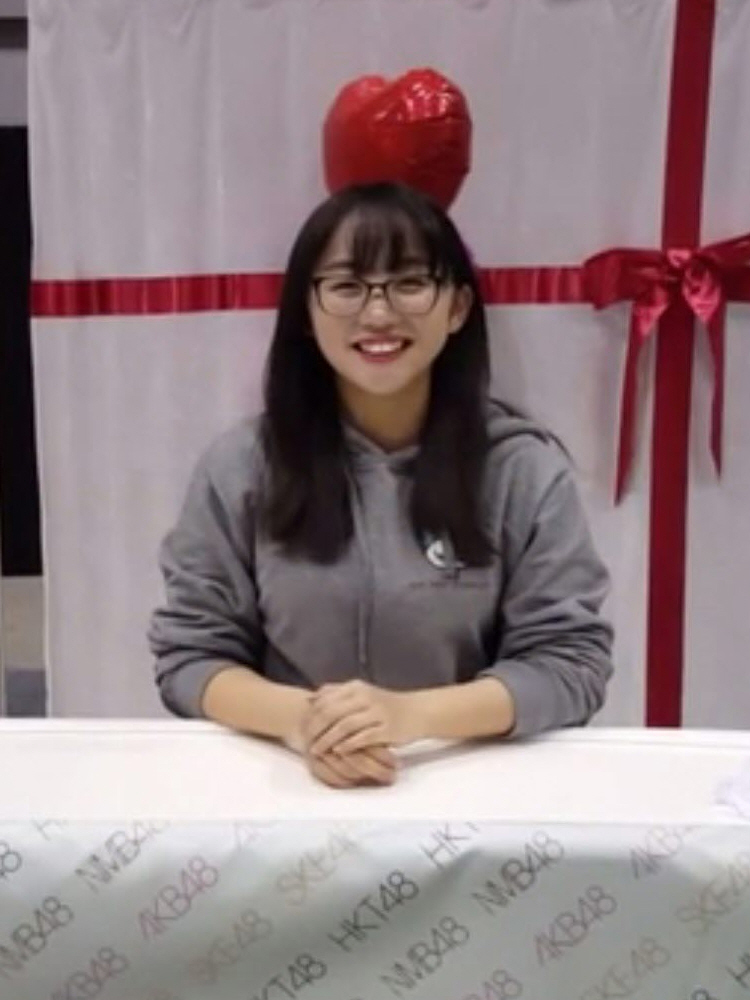

Background information
- Also known as: Shuu
- Born: 2 December 1998 (age 27)
- Origin: Osaka Prefecture, Japan
- Genre: J-pop
- Occupations: Idol; singer
- Instruments: Vocals; Keyboards
- Years active: 2011 – 2017
- Label: KYORAKU Yoshimoto Holdings
- Formerly of: NMB48

Shu Yabushita (薮下 柊, Yabushita Shu; born 2 December 1998) is a former Team BII member of the Japanese idol girl group NMB48. She was born in Osaka Prefecture and is currently based in New York.

== Biography ==
Yabushita passed NMB48's 3rd generation auditions in December 2011 when she had just turned 13. Her debut was on February 29, 2012. Her stage debut was on April 29, 2012. On October 10, 2012, she was selected for Team BII.

Yabushita's first NMB48 Senbatsu (selection to sing the A-side) was for the single Virginity.

In the 2013 idol elections, Yabushita ranked for the first time, placing 49th with 14,745 votes. In 2014, she placed 59th with 14,119 votes.

On December 9, 2016, after turning 18, Yabushita announced her graduation.

On April 19, 2017, Yabushita graduated from the group's Team N. A month earlier, her sister Fū joined the idol group STU48.

On June 29, 2018, Yabushita announced that she had moved to New York City.

== Discography ==
=== NMB48 singles ===
Year	No.	Title	Role	Notes
2012	4	"Nagiichi"	B-side	Sang on "Rifujin Ball"
2012	5	"Virginity"	A-side	First A-side. Also sang on "Mōsō Girlfriend" and "Sunahama no Pistol"
2012	6	"Kitagawa Kenji"	A-side	Also sang on "Fuyushougun no Regret"
2013	7	"Bokura no Eureka"	A-side	Also sang on "Todokekana Soude Todoku Mono"
2013	8	"Kamonegix"	A-side	
2014	9	"Takane no Ringo"	A-side	
2014	10	"Rashikunai"	A-side	Also sang on "Star ni Nante Naritakunai" as Team BII
2015	11	"Don't look back!"	A-side	Also sang on "Romantic Snow" as Team BII
2015	12	"Durain Shōnen"	A-side	Also sang on "Kokoro no Myoji wo Kake!" as Team BII
2015	13	"Must Be Now"	B-side	Also sang on "Kataomoi Yori mo Omoide wo..."
2016	14	"Amagami Hime"	A-side	Also sang on "Ferry", "Niji no Tsukurikata" and "Dotonbori yo, Naka Sete Kure!".
2016	15	"Boku wa Inai"	A-side	Also sang on "Mōsō Machine 3-gōki" as Team BII
2016	16	"Boku Igai no Dareka"	A-side	Last single to participate as NMB48 member. Also sang on "Kodoku Guitar" which she is double Center with Ririka Sutō.

=== AKB48 singles ===
Year	No.	Title	Role	Notes
2012	27	"Gingham Check"	B-side	Sang on "Ano Hi no Fuurin"
2012	29	"Eien Pressure"	B-side	Sang on "HA!"
2013	30	"So Long!"	B-side	Sang on "Waiting Room".
2013	32	"Koi Suru Fortune Cookie"	B-side	Ranked 49th in 2013 General Election. Sang on "Suitei Marmalade"
2013	34	"Suzukake no Ki no Michi de "Kimi no Hohoemi o Yume ni Miru" to Itte Shimattara Bokutachi no Kankei wa Dō Kawatte Shimau no ka, Bokunari ni Nan-nichi ka Kangaeta Ue de no Yaya Kihazukashii Ketsuron no Yō na Mono"	B-side	Sang on "Kimi to Deatte Boku wa Kawatta"
2014	35	"Mae Shika Mukanee"	B-side	Sang on "Kinou Yori Motto Suki"
2014	36	"Labrador Retriever"	A-side	First AKB48 A-side
2014	37	"Kokoro no Placard"	B-side	Ranked 59th in 2014 General Election. Sang on "Seikaku ga Warui Onna no Ko"
2014	38	"Kibouteki Refrain"	B-side	Sang on "Ima, Happy"
2015	39	"Green Flash"	B-side	Sang on "Punkish"
2015	41	"Halloween Night"	B-side	Ranked 60th in 2015 General Election. Sang on "Kimi ni Wedding Dress wo..."
2015	42	"Kuchibiru ni Be My Baby"	B-side	Sang on "Sakki Made wa Ice Tea" as Mushi Kago
2016	43	"Kimi wa Melody"	B-side	Marked as the 10th Anniversary Single. Sang on "Shigamitsuita Seishun" (NMB48)
2016	45	"Love Trip / Shiawase wo Wakenasai"	B-side	Sang on "Shinka Shitenee Jan" as Next Girls.
2017	47	"Shoot Sign"	B-side	Sang on "Mayonaka no Tsuyogari" as NMB48. Last single to participate as NMB48 member.

== Appearances ==
=== Stage Units ===
NMB48 Kenkyuusei Stage "Aitakatta"

1. "Nageki no Figure"
2. "Glass no I LOVE YOU"
3. "Senaka Kara Dakishimete"
4. "Rio no Kakumei"

NMB48 BII 1st Stage "Aitakatta"

1. "Nageki no Figure"
2. "Nagisa no CHERRY"
3. "Senaka Kara Dakishimete"
4. "Rio no Kakumei"

Team BII 2nd Stage "Tadaima Renaichuu"

1. "7ji 12fun no Hatsukoi"

Team BII 3rd Stage "Tadaima Renaichuu"

1. "Wagamama na Nagareboshi"

=== Variety Shows ===
- NMB48 Geinin! (2012)
- NMB48 Geinin!! 2 (2013)

=== TV Dramas ===
- AKB Horror Night: Adrenaline's Night Ep.32 - Face Authentication, as Risa (2016)
