= Nagisa Shibuya =

Japanese singer

Nagisa Shibuya 渋谷 凪咲
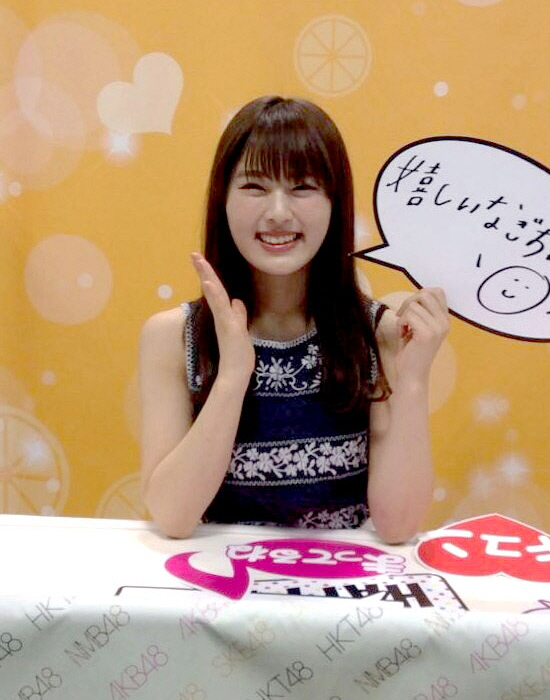

Background information
- Also known as: Nagisa
- Born: 25 August 1996 (age 30)
- Origin: Osaka Prefecture, Japan
- Genre: J-pop
- Occupations: Idol; singer
- Years active: 2012 – present
- Label: Kyoraku Yoshimoto Holdings

Nagisa Shibuya (渋谷 凪咲, Shibuya Nagisa; born 25 August 1996 in Osaka Prefecture) is a talent, actress and a former member of the Japanese idol girl group NMB48. She was the captain of NMB48's Team M. She is also a member of the AKB48 sub-unit Tentoumu Chu!, of NMB48 sub-unit Queentet, and formerly held a concurrent position in AKB48's Team 4.

== Biography ==
Shibuya passed NMB48's 4th generation auditions. Her debut was in December 2012. Her stage debut was in February 2013.

In October 2013, together with Tentoumu Chu!, she was cast for the drama Joshikou Keisatsu (女子高警察). In November 2013, she was selected to be the center of NMB48's coupling track on AKB48's single Suzukake Nanchara.

In February 2014, during AKB48's Group Shuffle, she was promoted to Team BII and also started holding a concurrent position in AKB48's Team 4. Her first NMB48 Senbatsu was for the single Takane no Ringo.

On October 18, 2016, during NMB48 Team Shuffle, she was transferred to Team M, taking effect on January 1, 2017.

On May 18, 2018, Shibuya's concurrent position in AKB48's Team 4 was terminated.

On January 1, 2019, during NMB48's new year event, Shibuya was promoted as captain of Team M, starting on March 1.

On August 7, 2023, she announced her graduation from the group.

== Discography ==
=== NMB48 singles ===
Year	No.	Title	Role	Notes
2013	7	"Bokura no Eureka"	B-side	Sang on "Hinadande wa Boku no Miryoku wa Ikinainda"
2013	8	"Kamonegix"	B-side	Sang on "Sunglasses to Uchiakebanashi" and "Mou Hadashi ni Hanarenai"
2014	9	"Takane no Ringo"	A-side	First A-side. Also sang on "Isshukan, Zenbu ga Getsuyoubi nara ii no ni"
2014	10	"Rashikunai"	A-side	Also sang on "Star ni Nante Naritakunai" as Team BII
2015	11	"Don't look back!"	A-side	Also sang on "Romantic Snow"
2015	12	"Durian Shōnen"	A-side	Sang on "Kokoro no moji o kake!".
2015	13	"Must be now"	B-side	Sang on "Kūfuku de Renai o suru na".
2016	14	"Amagami Hime"	A-side	Also sang on "Ferry", "Niji no Tsukurikata" and "Dotonbori yo, Naka Sete Kure!".
2016	15	"Boku wa Inai"	A-side	Also sang on "Mōsō Machine 3-gōki".

=== AKB48 singles ===
Year	No.	Title	Role	Notes
2013	32	"Koi Suru Fortune Cookie"	B-side	Sang on "Aozora Cafe"
2013	33	"Heart Electric"	B-side, Tentoumu Chu!	Sang on "Kimi Dake ni Chu! Chu! Chu!"
2013	34	"Suzukake no Ki no Michi de "Kimi no Hohoemi o Yume ni Miru" to Itte Shimattara Bokutachi no Kankei wa Dō Kawatte Shimau no ka, Bokunari ni Nan-nichi ka Kangaeta Ue de no Yaya Kihazukashii Ketsuron no Yō na Mono"	B-side, Tentoumu Chu!	Sang on "Kimi to Deatte Boku wa Kawatta" and "Erande Rainbow"
2014	35	"Mae Shika Mukanee"	B-side	Sang on "Kinou Yori Motto Suki"
2014	36	"Labrador Retriever"	A-side	First AKB48 A-side. Also sang on "Kyou Made no Melody" and "Heart no Dasshutsu Game"
2014	38	"Kibouteki Refrain"	B-side	Sang on "Ima, Happy" and "Me wo Aketa Mama no First Kiss"
2015	39	"Green Flash"	B-side, Tentoumu Chu!	Sang on "Punkish" and "Hatsukoi no Oshibe"
2015	40	"Bokutachi wa Tatakawanai"	B-side, Tentoumu Chu!	Also sang ""Danshi" wa Kenkyū Taishō".
2015	41	"Halloween Night"	B-side, Future Girls	Ranked 58th in 2015 General Election. Also sang on "Kimi ni Wedding Dress wo...".
2015	42	"Kuchibiru ni Be My Baby"	B-side	Also sang on "Nanka, Chotto, Kyū ni..." as Team 4.
2016	43	"Kimi wa Melody"	B-side	Marked as the 10th Anniversary Single. Sang on "Shigamitsuita Seishun" (NMB48)
2016	44	"Tsubasa wa Iranai"	B-side	Sang on "Kangaeru Hito" as Team 4.

== Appearances ==
=== Stage Units ===
NMB48 Kenkyuusei Stage "Seishun Girls"

1. "Kinjirareta Futari"
2. "Fushidara na Natsu"

Team BII 3rd Stage "Saka Agari"

1. "Mushi no Ballad"

Team 4 3rd Stage "Idol no Yoake"

1. "Kataomoi no Taikakusen"

=== Variety Shows ===
- AKBINGO!
- Tentoumu Chu! no Sekai o Muchuu ni Sasemasu Sengen
- AKB48 Show!

=== Dramas ===
- Chosen Home (2025), Madoka Momose
- Did Someone Happen to Mention Me? (2026)

=== Film ===
- Sana: Let Me Hear (2024), Honoka
- Part-time Death Angel (2026), Shizuka

== Awards and nominations ==
Year	Award	Category	Work(s)	Result	Ref.
2025	48th Japan Academy Film Prize	Newcomer of the Year	Sana: Let Me Hear	Won	
