= Kei Jonishi =

Kei Jonishi 上西 恵
- Also known as: Keicchi
- Born: 18 March 1995 (age 30)
- Origin: Shiga Prefecture, Japan
- Genres: J-pop
- Occupations: Idol; singer
- Instruments: Vocals; Drums
- Years active: 2010 – present
- Labels: KYORAKU Yoshimoto Holdings

Kei Jonishi (上西 恵, Jōnishi Kei, born 18 March 1995 in Shiga Prefecture) is a former member of the Japanese idol girl group NMB48. She was a member of NMB48's Team N.

== Biography ==
Jonishi passed NMB48's 1st generation auditions in September 2010. Her audition song was SCANDAL's Shunkan Sentimental. Her debut was on October 9, 2010. In March 2011, she was selected to Team N. Her first NMB48 Senbatsu was the single Zetsumetsu Kurokami Shōjo. Prior to joining NMB48, she has no experience in singing or dancing.

On the 2013 general elections, Jonishi ranked for the first time, placing 40th with 17,381 votes.

In February 2014, during AKB48's Group Shuffle, Jonishi was appointed the vice-captain of Team N. In 2014, she ranked at 58th with 14,194 votes in the group's general elections. In 2015, she ranked at 36th with 21,135 votes in that.

On April 18, 2017, Jonishi graduated from the group's Team N.

== Discography ==
=== NMB48 singles ===
Year	No.	Title	Role	Notes
2011	1	"Zetsumetsu Kurokami Shōjo"	A-side	Debut with NMB48 Team N. Sang on "Seishun no Lap Time", "Mikazuki no Senaka" and "Boku ga Maketa Natsu" with Shirogumi
2011	2	"Oh My God!"	A-side	Sang on "Boku wa Matteru", "Hoshokusha tachi yo" with Akagumi and "Uso no Tenbin"
2012	3	"Junjō U-19"	A-side	Sang on "Migi e Magare!" and "Renai no Speed"
2012	4	"Nagiichi"	A-side	Sang on "Saigo no Catharsis" with Shirogumi
2012	5	"Virginity (song)"	A-side	Sang on "Mōsō Girlfriend" and "Bokura no Regatta"
2012	6	"Kitagawa Kenji"	A-side	Sang on "In-Goal"
2013	7	"Bokura no Eureka"	A-side	Sang on "Todokekana Soude Todoku Mono"
2013	8	"Kamonegix"	A-side	
2014	9	"Takane no Ringo"	A-side	
2014	10	"Rashikunai"	A-side	Sang on "Kyusen Kyotei" as Team N.
2015	11	"Don't look back!"	A-side	Sang on "Sotsugyou Ryokō" and "Renai Petenshi" as Team N.
2015	12	"Durian Shōnen"	A-side	Sang on "Inochi no Heso" as Team N.
2015	13	"Must Be Now"	A-side	Sang on "Kataomoi Yori mo Omoide wo..." and "Yume ni Iro ga Nai Riyū" as Team N.
2016	14	"Amagami Hime"	A-side	Sang on "Hakanai Monogatari" as Team N.
2016	15	"Boku wa Inai"	A-side	Sang on "Sora Kara Ai ga Futte Kuru" as Team N.
2016	16	"Boku Igai no Dareka"	A-side	Last single to participate Also sang "Tochū Gesha" which is her graduation song and "Kodoku Guitar" as Team N.

=== AKB48 singles ===
Year	No.	Title	Role	Notes
2012	27	"Gingham Check"	B-side	Sang on "Ano Hi no Fuurin"
2012	29	"Eien Pressure"	B-side	Sang on "HA!"
2013	32	"Koi Suru Fortune Cookie"	B-side	Ranked 40th in 2013 General Election. Sang "Kondo Koso Ecstasy"
2013	34	"Suzukake no Ki no Michi de "Kimi no Hohoemi o Yume ni Miru" to Itte Shimattara Bokutachi no Kankei wa Dō Kawatte Shimau no ka, Bokunari ni Nan-nichi ka Kangaeta Ue de no Yaya Kihazukashii Ketsuron no Yō na Mono"	B-side	Sang on "Kimi to Deatte Boku wa Kawatta"
2014	35	"Mae Shika Mukanee"	B-side	Sang on "Kimi no Uso wo Shitteita"
2014	37	"Kokoro no Placard"	B-side	Ranked 58th in 2014 General Election. Sang on "Seikaku ga Warui Onna no Ko"
2014	38	"Kibouteki Refrain"	B-side	Sang on "Utaitai"
2015	39	"Green Flash"	B-side	Sang on "Punkish" as NMB48.
2015	41	"Halloween Night"	B-side	Sang on "Mizu no Naka no Dendouritsu"
2016	43	"Kimi wa Melody"	B-side	Sang on "Shigamitsuita Seishun" as NMB48.
2017	47	"Shoot Sign"	B-side	Sang on "Mayonaka no Tsuyogari" as NMB48. Last single to participate as NMB48 member.
