= Miyuki Watanabe =

Miyuki Watanabe 渡辺 美優紀
- Also known as: Milky (みるきー, Mirukī)
- Born: 19 September 1993 (age 32)
- Origin: Nara Prefecture, Japan
- Genres: J-pop
- Occupations: Idol; singer; model
- Years active: 2010–present
- Labels: Kyoryaku Yoshimoto Holdings etichetta/WM Japan
- Formerly of: NMB48; AKB48; SKE48

Miyuki Watanabe (渡辺 美優紀, Watanabe Miyuki; born 19 September 1993 in Nara Prefecture) is a former member of multiple Japanese idol girl groups. She is a former member of NMB48's Team BII, and a former member of SKE48's Team S. She was also on AKB48 Team B.

== Career ==
Watanabe passed NMB48's first-generation auditions on 20 September 2010, and debuted on 9 October the same year. Her theater debut was on 1 January 2011.

On 10 March 2011, she was selected to form NMB48's Team N. Watanabe and Sayaka Yamamoto were chosen as a senbatsu member for AKB48's 21st single "Everyday, Katyusha". Watanabe held an AKB48 Team B concurrent position from March 2012 to April 2014. Following that, she has a concurrent position in SKE48's Team S since April 2014.

In AKB48's 2013 general elections, Watanabe placed 15th. In AKB48's Janken Tournament in 2014, she won first place, and had a solo debut. Her first solo single, "Yasashiku Suru Yori Kiss o Shite", was released on 24 December 2014.

On March 26, 2015, it was announced that her concurrent position in SKE48 would be canceled. On April 13, 2016, she announced her graduation. On July 3 to 4, 2016, Watanabe's graduation concert titled "Until The End Warukī, I'm Sorry" was held at Kobe World Memorial Hall. Watanabe graduated from the group and had her last stage performance on August 9, 2016.

== Discography ==
=== Solo albums ===
Year	Title	Chart positions	Notes
Year	Title	JPN	Notes
2019	17%	11	1st solo album

=== Solo singles ===
Year	Title	Chart positions	Notes
Year	Title	JPN	Notes
2014	"Yasashiku Suru Yori Kiss o Shite"	4	Solo debut after winning AKB48's Janken Tournament 2014
2018	"Milky Land"	—	Second solo debut after her graduation from NMB48

=== NMB48 singles ===
Year	No.	Title	Role	Notes
2011	1	"Zetsumetsu Kurokami Shōjo"	A-side, Center	Also sang on "Seishun no Lap Time", "Mattemashita, Shingakki" and "Mikazuki no Senaka"
2011	2	"Oh My God!"	B-side	Sang on "Boku wa Matteru" and "Hoshokusha tachi yo"
2012	3	"Junjō U-19"	A-side	Also sang on "Migi e Magare!" and "Renai no Speed"
2012	4	"Nagiichi"	A-side, Center	Also sang on "Boku ga Mo Sukoshi Daitan Nara", "Hatsukoi no Yukue to Play Ball" and "Warukii"
2012	5	"Virginity"	A-side	Also sang on "Mousou Girlfriend" and "Sonzai Shitenai Mono"
2012	6	"Kitagawa Kenji"	A-side	Also sang on "In-Goal" and "Renai Higaitodoke"
2013	7	"Bokura no Eureka"	A-side	Also sang on "Todokanasou de Todoku Mono" and "Yabanna Softcream"
2013	8	"Kamonegikkusu"	A-side	Also sang on "Omowase Kousen"
2014	9	"Takane no Ringo"	A-side	Also sang on "Mizukiri"
2014	10	"Rashikunai"	A-side	Also sang on "Star ni Nante Naritakunai"
2015	11	"Don't Look Back!"	A-side	Also sang on "Romantic Snow"
2015	12	"Durian Shōnen"	A-side	Sang on "Kokoro no moji o kake!".
2015	13	"Must be now"	A-side	Sang on "Kūfuku de Renai o suru na".
2016	14	"Amagami Hime"	A-side	Also sang on "Ferry" and "Dotonbori yo, Naka Sete Kure!".
2016	15	"Boku wa Inai"	A-side, Center	First solo Center and last single to participate. Also sang on "Ima Naraba", "Mōsō Machine 3-gōki" and "Yume no Nagori" which is her graduation song.

=== SKE48 singles ===
Year	No.	Title	Role	Notes
2014	15	"Bukiyō Taiyō"	A-side	Also sang on "Houkago Race"
2014	16	"12 Gatsu no Kangaroo"	A-side	Also sang on "Kesenai Honoo"

=== AKB48 singles ===
Year	No.	Title	Role	Notes
2011	21	"Everyday, Katyusha"	A-side	First AKB48 senbatsu
2011	22	"Flying Get"	B-side	Sang on "Yasai Uranai"
2012	25	"Give Me Five!"	B-side	Sang on "New Ship"
2012	26	"Manatsu no Sounds Good!"	A-side	
2012	27	"Gingham Check"	B-side	Sang on "Nante Bohemian"
2012	28	"Uza"	A-side	Also sang on "Seigi no Mikata Janai Hero"
2012	29	"Eien Pressure"	B-side	Sang on "Ha!" (NMB48)
2013	30	"So Long!"	A-side	Also sang on "Sokode inu no Unchi Fun jau ka ne?"
2013	31	"Sayonara Crawl"	A-side	Also sang on "Romance Kenjuu"
2013	32	"Koi Suru Fortune Cookie"	A-side	
2013	33	"Heart Electric"	A-side	Also sang on "Tiny T-Shirt"
2013	34	"Suzukake no Ki no Michi de "Kimi no Hohoemi o Yume ni Miru" to Itte Shimattara Bokutachi no Kankei wa Dō Kawatte Shimau no ka, Bokunari ni Nan-nichi ka Kangaeta Ue de no Yaya Kihazukashii Ketsuron no Yō na Mono"	B-side	Sang on "Mosh & Dive" and "Kimi to Deatte Boku wa Kawatta" (NMB48)
2014	35	"Mae shika Mukanee"	A-side	
2014	36	"Labrador Retriever"	A-side	
2014	37	"Kokoro no Placard"	B-side	Sang on "Dareka ga Nageta Ball"
2014	38	"Kibōteki Refrain"	A-side	
2015	39	"Green Flash"	B-side	Sang on "Majisuka Fight" and "Punkish" (NMB48)
2015	40	"Bokutachi wa Tatakawanai"	A-side	Sang on "Bokutachi wa Tatakawanai" without participating in the music video. Also sang "Summer side".
2015	41	"Halloween Night"	A-side	Ranked 12th in 2015 General Election. Also sang on "Yankee Machine Gun".
2015	42	"Kuchibiru ni Be My Baby"	B-side	Also sang on "365 Nichi no Kamihikōki", "Kimi wo Kimi wo Kimi wo..." and "Kin no Hane wo Motsu Hito yo".
2016	43	"Kimi wa Melody"	B-side	Marked as the 10th Anniversary Single. Sang on "Shigamitsuita Seishun" (NMB48)
2016	44	"Tsubasa wa Iranai"	B-side	Sang on "Koi o Suru to Baka o Miru". Last single to participate as Team B member.

== Appearances ==
=== Stage units ===
NMB48 Kenkyusei Stage "Dareka no Tame ni" (誰かのために)

1. "Nage Kiss de Uchi Otose!" (投げキッスで撃ち落せ!)
2. "Seifuku ga Jama wo Suru" (制服が邪魔をする)

NMB48 Team N 1st Stage "Dareka no Tame ni" (誰かのために)

1. "Nage Kiss de Uchi Otose!" (投げキッスで撃ち落せ!)
2. "Seifuku ga Jama wo Suru" (制服が邪魔をする)

NMB48 Team N 2nd Stage "Seishun Girls" (青春ガールズ)

1. "Ame no Doubutsuen" (雨の動物園)
2. "Fushidara na Natsu" (ふしだらな夏)

AKB48 Waiting Stage

1. "Gomen ne Jewel" (ごめんね ジュエル)

NMB48 Team N 3rd Stage "Koko ni Datte Tenshi wa Iru" (ここにだって天使はいる)

1. "Zipper"
2. "Hajimete no Hoshi" (初めての星)
3. "100nen Saki Demo" (100年先でも)

NMB48 Team BII 3rd Stage "Saka Agari" (逆上がり)

1. "Dakishimeraretara" (抱きしめられたら)

SKE48 Team S 3rd Stage "Seifuku no Me" (制服の芽)

1. "Kareha no Station" (枯葉のステーション)

Team Surprise 2nd Stage "Bara no Gishiki" (バラの儀式)

1. "Youchien no Sensei" (幼稚園の先生)
2. "Tokimeki Antique" (ときめきアンティーク)

=== TV variety ===
- AKBingo! (2011–2016 )
- AKB48 to XX (2011-2016)
- NMB48 Geinin! (2012)
- NMB48 Geinin!! 2 (2013)
- NMB48 Geinin!!! 3 (2014)
- Ariyoshi AKB Kyowakoku (有吉AKB共和国) (2013)
- NMB48 to Manabukun (2013-2016 )
- SKE48 Ebisho (2014)
- SKE48 Ebicalcio (2014-2015)

=== TV dramas ===
- So Long! 3rd Night (2013)
- Majisuka Gakuen 4 (マジすか学園4) (2015), Coby
- Majisuka Gakuen 5 (マジすか学園5) (2015), Coby
- AKB Horror Night: Adrenline's Night (AKBホラーナイト アドレナリンの夜) Ep.9 - Live Broadcast (2015), Miyu
- AKB Love Night: Love Factory (AKBラブナイト 恋工場) Ep. 17 - Comical Love (2016), Ayaka

=== Movies ===
- NMB48 Geinin! The Movie Owarai Seishun Girls! (2013)
- NMB48 Geinin! The Movie Returns Sotsugyou! Owarai Seishun Girls!! Aratanaru Tabidachi (2014)
