= Fūko Yagura =

- 矢倉 楓子
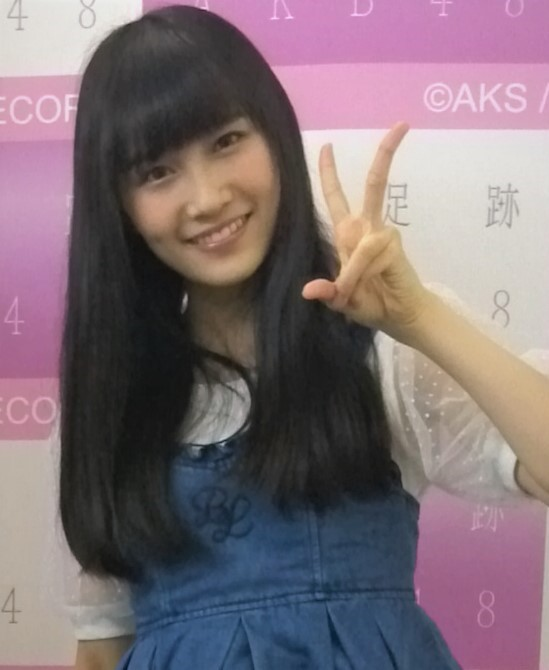
- Born: 24 February 1997 (age 29)
- Other name: Fuuchan
- Occupations: YouTuber; Idol (formerly)
- Years active: 2019 – present

YouTube information
- Channel: Fūko Yagura
- Years active: 2020–present
- Subscribers: 11.4k
- Views: 262k
- Musical career
- Genres: J-pop
- Instrument: Vocals
- Years active: 2011 – 2018
- Formerly of: AKB48, NMB48
- Last updated: 4 September 2022

Fūko Yagura (矢倉 楓子, Yagura Fūko; born 24 February 1997 in Osaka Prefecture) is a former member of the Japanese idol girl group NMB48. She was a member of NMB48's Team M.

== Career ==
Yagura passed NMB48's second-generation auditions in May 2011, and debuted on 5 June 2011. Her stage debut was on 13 August 2011. She was first selected for NMB48's Senbatsu for the single "Oh My God!". In January 2012, Yagura was selected to form Team M. In April 2013, she started holding an AKB48 concurrent position in Team A.

In the 2013 general elections, Yagura ranked for the first time, placing 44th with 16,281 votes. In the 2014 general elections, she placed 41st with 18,596 votes.

In September 2014, it was announced she and Miru Shiroma would be the centers for NMB48's 10th single Rashikunai.

On October 11, 2017, Yagura announced her graduation during the NMB48 Arena Tour 2017. She graduated from the group on April 10, 2018, by the last performance at the NMB48 theatre, and retired from the entertainment industry.

In 2019, it was announced that Yagura would return to the entertainment industry. She appeared in episode 5 of the drama Hakui no Senshi, which was aired on May 15.

In 2020, she launched her YouTube channel.

== Discography ==
=== NMB48 singles ===
Year	No.	Title	Role	Notes
2011	2	"Oh My God!"	A-side	Sang on "Boku wa Matteru" and "Kessho"
2012	3	"Junjō U-19"	A-side	Sang on "Migi e Magare!"
2012	4	"Nagiichi"	A-side	Sang on "Saigo no Catharsis"
2012	5	"Virginity (song)"	B-side	Sang on Sunahama de Pistol"
2012	6	"Kitagawa Kenji"	A-side	Sang on "In-Goal", "Renai Higaitodoke" and "Fuyushogun no Regret"
2013	7	"Bokura no Eureka"	A-side	Sang on "Todokekana Sode Todoku Mono" and "Yabanna Softcream"
2013	8	"Kamonegix"	A-side	Sang on "Omowase Kousen"
2014	9	"Takane no Ringo"	A-side	Sang on "Prom no Koibito"
2014	10	"Rashikunai"	A-side, center	Sang on "Migi ni Shiteru Ring"
2015	11	"Don't look back!"	A-side	Sang on "Sotsugyō Ryokō" as NMB48's 1st generation and "Heart Sakebu" as Team M.
2015	12	"Durian Shōnen"	A-side	Sang on "Boku dake no Secret time" as Team M.
2015	13	"Must be now"	A-side	Sang on "Kataomoi Yori mo Omoide wo..." and "Good-bye, Guitar" as Team M
2016	14	"Amagami Hime"	A-side,	Sang on "Koi wo Isoge" as Team M and "Dōtonbori yo, Naka Sete Kure!".

=== AKB48 singles ===
Year	No.	Title	Role	Notes
2012	27	"Gingham Check"	B-side	Sang on "Ano Hi no Fuurin"
2012	29	"Eien Pressure"	B-side	Sang on "HA!"
2013	30	"So Long!"	B-side	Sang on "Waiting Room"
2013	31	"Sayonara Crawl"	A-side	First AKB48 A-side
2013	32	"Koi Suru Fortune Cookie"	B-side	Ranked 44th in 2013 general elections. Sang on "Kondo Koso Ecstasy"
2013	33	"Heart Electric"	B-side	Sang on "Kaisoku to Dotai Shiryoku" and "Kiss Made Countdown"
2013	34	"Suzukake no Ki no Michi de "Kimi no Hohoemi o Yume ni Miru" to Itte Shimattara Bokutachi no Kankei wa Dō Kawatte Shimau no ka, Bokunari ni Nan-nichi ka Kangaeta Ue de no Yaya Kihazukashii Ketsuron no Yō na Mono"	B-side	Sang on "Kimi to Deatte Boku wa Kawatta"
2014	35	"Mae Shika Mukanee"	B-side	Sang on "Kino yori Motto Suki"
2014	36	"Labrador Retriever"	A-side	Also sang on "Kimi wa Kimagure"
2014	37	"Kokoro no Placard"	B-side	Ranked 41st in 2014 General Elections. Sang on "Hito Natsu no Hankoki"
2014	38	"Kibōteki Refrain"	B-side	Sang on "Jujun na Slave" and "Ambulance"
2015	39	"Green Flash"	B-side	Sang on "Yankee Rock" and "Punkish"
2016	43	"Kimi wa Melody"	B-side	Sang on "Shigamitsuita Seishun"

== Appearances ==
=== Stage units ===
NMB48 Kenkyuusei Stage "Party ga Hajimaru yo" (PARTYが始まるよ)

1. "Hoshi no Ondo" (星の温度)

NMB48 Team M 1st Stage "Idol no Yoake" (アイドルの夜明け)

1. "Zannen Shoujo" (残念少女)

AKB48 Team A Waiting Stage

1. "Candy" (キャンディー)

AKB48 Team A 5th Stage "Renai Kinshi Jourei" (恋愛禁止条例) (Revival)

1. "Heart Gata Virus" (ハート型ウイルス)

NMB48 Team M 2nd Stage "Reset"

1. "Seifuku Resistance" (制服レジスタンス)

=== TV variety ===
- NMB48 Geinin! (NMB48 げいにん!) (2012)
- NMB48 Geinin!! 2 (NMB48 げいにん!! 2) (2013)
- NMB48 Geinin!!! 3 (NMB48 げいにん!!! 3) (2014)
- NMB to Manabukun (NMBとまなぶくん) (2013–2017)
- AKBingo! (2014–2017)
- AKB48 Nemosu Terebi (AKB48ネ申テレビ) (2014)

=== TV dramas ===
- Danran (だんらん) (2013)
- Majisuka Gakuen 4 (マジすか学園4) (2015) as Kurobara
- Majisuka Gakuen 5 (マジすか学園5) (2015) as Kurobara
- AKB Horror Night: Adrenaline's Night (AKBホラーナイト アドレナリンの夜) Ep.37 - SNS (2016) as Yuri
- AKB Love Night: Love Factory (AKBラブナイト 恋工場) Ep.12 - Blue Photo Club (2016) as Chihiro
- Cabasuka Gakuen (キャバすか学園) (2016) as Kurobara

=== Movies ===
- NMB48 Geinin! The Movie Owarai Seishun Girls! (NMB48 げいにん!THE MOVIE お笑い青春ガールズ!) (2013)
- NMB48 Geinin! The Movie Returns Sotsugyou! Owarai Seishun Girls! Aratanaru Tabidachi (NMB48 げいにん!THE MOVIE リターンズ 卒業!お笑い青春ガールズ!!新たなる旅立ち) (2014)
- Jojoen (2018)
