= Don't Look Back! (NMB48 song) =

- Don't look back! Type A Limited Edition Cover

Single by NMB48
- Released: March 31, 2015 (Japan)
- Genre: J-pop
- Label: laugh out loud records

NMB48 singles chronology
"Rashikunai" (2014)	"Don't Look Back!" (2015)	"Dorian Shōnen" (2015)

"Don't Look Back!" is the 11th single by Japanese idol girl group NMB48. It was released on March 31, 2015. This single and SKE48's Coquettish Jūtai Chū were released on the same day, and SKE48 placed 1st in Oricon's Daily Charts on its first day with 573,074 copies sold. NMB48 thus placed 2nd with 381,650 copies sold.

== Background ==
This single was released in 7 versions: Type A (limited/regular), Type B (limited/regular), Type C (limited/regular) and Theater Edition. The title song was first performed on Music Station on February 13, 2015.

== Track list ==
=== Type-A regular ===
CD
No.	Title	Artist(s)	Length
1.	"Don't look back!"
2.	"Sotsugyou Ryokou" (卒業旅行)	NMB48 1st Generation
3.	"Renai Petenshi" (恋愛ペテン師)	Team N
4.	"Don't look back! (off vocal)"
5.	"Sotsugyou Ryokou (off vocal)"
6.	"Renai Petenshi (off vocal)"

DVD
No.	Title	Length
1.	"Don't look back! (music video)"
2.	"Don't look back! (music video dance version)"
3.	"Renai Petenshi (music video)"
4.	"Seishun no Lap Time (music video)"

=== Type-A limited ===
CD
No.	Title	Artist(s)	Length
1.	"Don't look back!"
2.	"Nietzsche Senpai" (ニーチェ先輩)	Namba Teppoudai Sono Roku
3.	"Renai Petenshi" (恋愛ペテン師)	Team N
4.	"Don't look back! (off vocal)"
5.	"Nietzsche Senpai(off vocal)"
6.	"Renai Petenshi (off vocal)"

DVD
No.	Title	Length
1.	"NMB48 4th Anniversary Live @ Grand Cube Osaka Main Hall (2014.10.14)"

=== Type-B regular ===
CD
No.	Title	Artist(s)	Length
1.	"Don't look back!"
2.	"Sotsugyou Ryokou" (卒業旅行)	NMB48 1st Generation
3.	"Heart Sakebu" (ハート、叫ぶ。)	Team M
4.	"Minna, Daisuki" (みんな、大好き)	Yamada Nana
5.	"Don't look back! (off vocal)"
6.	"Sotsugyou Ryokou (off vocal)"
7.	"Heart Sakebu (off vocal)"
8.	"Minna, Daisuki (off vocal)"

DVD
No.	Title	Length
1.	"Don't look back! (music video)"
2.	"Don't look back! (music video dance version)"
3.	"Heart Sakebu (music video)"
4.	"Tomodachi (music video)"

=== Type-C limited ===
CD
No.	Title	Artist(s)	Length
1.	"Don't look back!"
2.	"Nietzsche Senpai" (ニーチェ先輩)	Namba Teppoudai Sono Roku
3.	"Heart Sakebu" (ハート、叫ぶ。)	Team M
4.	"Minna, Daisuki" (みんな、大好き)	Yamada Nana
5.	"Don't look back! (off vocal)"
6.	"Nietzsche Senpai (off vocal)"
7.	"Heart Sakebu (off vocal)"
8.	"Minna, Daisuki (off vocal)"

DVD
No.	Title	Length
1.	"NMB48 4th Anniversary Live @ Grand Cube Osaka Main Hall (2014.10.15)"

=== Type-C regular ===
CD
No.	Title	Artist(s)	Length
1.	"Don't look back!"
2.	"Sotsugyou Ryokou" (卒業旅行)	NMB48 1st Generation
3.	"Romantic Snow" (ロマンティックスノ)	Team BII
4.	"Don't look back! (off vocal)"
5.	"Sotsugyou Ryokou (off vocal)"
6.	"Romantic Snow (off vocal)"

DVD
No.	Title	Length
1.	"Don't look back! (music video)"
2.	"Don't look back! (music video dance version)"
3.	"Romantic Snow (music video)"
4.	"Bonus Video NMB48 feat. Yoshimoto Shin Kigeki Vol.11"

=== Type-C limited ===
CD
No.	Title	Artist(s)	Length
1.	"Don't look back!"
2.	"Nietzsche Senpai" (ニーチェ先輩)	Namba Teppoudai Sono Roku
3.	"Romantic Snow" (ロマンティックスノ)	Team BII
4.	"Don't look back! (off vocal)"
5.	"Nietzsche Senpai (off vocal)"
6.	"Romantic Snow (off vocal)"

DVD
No.	Title	Length
1.	"NMB48 4th Anniversary Live @ Grand Cube Osaka Main Hall (2014.10.16)"

=== Theater Edition ===
CD
No.	Title	Artist(s)	Length
1.	"Don't look back!"
2.	"Sotsugyou Ryokou" (卒業旅行)	NMB48 1st Generation
3.	"Nietzsche Senpai" (ニーチェ先輩)	Namba Teppoudai Sono Roku
4.	"Don't look back! (off vocal)"
5.	"Sotsugyou Ryokou (off vocal)"
6.	"Nietzsche Senpai (off vocal)"

== Members ==
=== Don't look back! ===
Team N: Yuki Kashiwagi, Yuuka Kato, Riho Kotani, Kei Jonishi, Aika Nishimura, Sayaka Yamamoto, Akari Yoshida, Ririka Sutou, Yuuri Ota
Team M: Miru Shiroma, Airi Tanigawa, Reina Fujie, Sae Murase, Fuuko Yagura, Nana Yamada, Rina Kushiro
Team BII: Miori Ichikawa, Ayaka Umeda, Kanako Kadowaki, Konomi Kusaka, Nagisa Shibuya, Shu Yabushita, Miyuki Watanabe

=== Renai Petenshi ===
Team N: Yuuri Ota, Yuki Kashiwagi, Yuuka Kato, Rika Kishino, Saki Kono, Narumi Koga, Riho Kotani, Kei Jonishi, Ririka Sutou, Aika Nishimura, Anna Murashige, Kanako Muro, Natsumi Yamagishi, Yuki Yamaguchi, Sayaka Yamamoto, Akari Yoshida, Natsuko Akashi, Yuumi Ishida, Eriko Jo, Rurina Nishizawa, Rina Yamao

=== Heart Sakebu ===
Team M: Yuki Azuma, Akari Ishizuka, Ayaka Okita, Rena Kawakami, Momoka Kinoshita, Rina Kushiro, Rina Kondo, Miru Shiroma, Yui Takano, Sara Takei, Airi Tanigawa, Reina Fujie, Arisa Miura, Mao Mita, Ayaka Murakami, Sae Murase, Fuuko Yagura, Nana Yamada, Azusa Uemura, Megumi Matsumura, Reina Nakano, Ayaka Morita, Mizuki Uno

=== Minna, Daisuki ===
Team M: Nana Yamada

=== Romantic Snow ===
Team BII: Anna Ijiri, Kanae Iso, Miori Ichikawa, Mirei Ueda, Ayaka Umeda, Kanako Kadowaki, Emika Kamieda, Chihiro Kawakami, Haruna Kinoshita, Konomi Kusaka, Hazuki Kurokawa, Nagisa Shibuya, Akane Takayanagi, Kokoro Naiki, Momoka Hayashi, Shu Yabushita, Miyuki Watanabe, Mai Odan, Honoka Terui, Chiho Matsuoka

=== Nietzsche Senpai ===
(Namba Teppoudai Sono 6)
Team N: Ririka Sutou, Natsuko Akashi, Eriko Jo, Rina Yamao
Team M: Reina Nakano
Team BII: Mirei Ueda, Chihiro Kawakami, Haruna Kinoshita

=== Sotsugyou Ryokou ===
Team N: Kishino Rika, Kotani Riho, Jonishi Kei, Yamagishi Natsumi, Yamaguchi Yuki, Yamamoto Sayaka, Yoshida Akari
Team M: Yamada Nana, Kawakami Rena, Kinoshita Momoka, Kondo Rina, Shiroma Miru, Okita Ayaka
Team BII: Kadowaki Kanako, Kinoshita Haruna, Watanabe Miyuki
