= Yokubomono =

Single by NMB48
- A-side: "Yokubomono"
- Released: 4 April 2018
- Genre: J-pop
- Length: 5:15
- Label: laugh out loud records

NMB48 singles chronology
"Warota People" (2017)	"Yokubomono" (2018)	"Boku Datte Naichau yo" (2018)

Music video
- Yokubomono (full version)

"Yokubomono" (欲望者, Desirer) is the 18th single by Japanese idol girl group NMB48. It was released on 4 April 2018. It reached number-one on the weekly Oricon Singles Chart with 193,740 copies sold. It also reached the first place on the Billboard Japan Hot 100. This is the first NMB48 single to sell less than their debut single in the first week.

== Track listing ==
=== Type A ===
CD+DVD: YRCS-90146
No.	Title	Length
1.	"Yokubomono"
2.	"Thinking time (Yoshida Akari)"
3.	"Hankyuu Densha (Team N)"
4.	"Yokubomono (off vocal)"
5.	"Thinking time (off vocal)"
6.	"Hankyuu Densha (off vocal)"

=== Type B ===
CD+DVD: YRCS-90147
No.	Title	Length
1.	"Yokubomono"
2.	"Thinking time (Yoshida Akari)"
3.	"Yojijukugo Girls (Team M)"
4.	"Yokubomono (off vocal)"
5.	"Thinking time (off vocal)"
6.	"Yojijukugo Girls (off vocal)"

=== Type C ===
CD+DVD: YRCS-90148
No.	Title	Length
1.	"Yokubomono"
2.	"Thinking time (Yoshida Akari)"
3.	"Saji wo Nageru na! (Team BII)"
4.	"Yokubomono (off vocal)"
5.	"Thinking time (off vocal)"
6.	"Saji wo Nageru na! (off vocal)"

=== Type D ===
CD+DVD: YRCS-90149
No.	Title	Length
1.	"Yokubomono"
2.	"Thinking time (Yoshida Akari)"
3.	"Good Timing"
4.	"Yokubomono (off vocal)"
5.	"Thinking time (off vocal)"
6.	"Good Timing (off vocal)"

=== Theater version ===
CD: YRCS-90150
No.	Title	Length
1.	"Yokubomono"
2.	"Thinking time (Akari Yoshida)"
3.	"Gokai (Miru Shiroma & Fuuko Yagura)"
4.	"Yokubomono (off vocal)"
5.	"Thinking time (off vocal)"
6.	"Gokai (off vocal)"

NOTE: Theater version doesn't include a Bonus DVD

== Personnel ==
=== "Yokubomono (Senbatsu)" ===
The performers of the main single are:

- Team N: Miori Ichikawa, Cocona Umeyama, Airi Tanigawa, Ayaka Yamamoto, Sayaka Yamamoto
- Team M: Momoka Iwata, Yuuka Kato, Nagisa Shibuya, Miru Shiroma, Akari Yoshida
- Team BII: Azusa Uemura, Yuuri Ota, Eriko Jo, Rei Jonishi, Sae Murase, Fuuko Yagura

The member marked in RED is the song center

=== "Thinking time" ===
"Thinking time" was performed by Akari Yoshida:

- Team M: Akari Yoshida

=== "Hankyuu Densha" ===
"Hankyuu Densha" was performed by Team N members, consisting of:

- Team N: Yuki Azuma, Miori Ichikawa, Cocona Umeyama, Konomi Kusaka, Narumi Koga, Karin Kojima, Airi Tanigawa, Kokoro Naiki, Momoka Hayashi, Shion Mori, Yuzuha Hongou, Mao Mita, Rina Yamao, Ayaka Yamamoto, Sayaka Yamamoto

=== "Yojijukugo Girls" ===
"Yojijukugo Girls" was performed by Team M members, consisting of:

- Team M: Ishida Yuumi, Iso Kanae, Iwata Momoka, Uno Mizuki, Odan Mai, Kato Yuuka, Kawakami Chihiro, Kawakami Rena, Shibuya Nagisa, Shiroma Miru, Nakano Reina, Nishizawa Rurina, Yasuda Momone, Yamada Suzu, Yoshida Akari

=== "Saji wo Nageru na!' ===
"Saji wo Nageru na!" was performed by Team BII members, consisting of:

- Team BII: Akashi Natsuko, Ishizuka Akari, Ijiri Anna, Uemura Azusa, Ota Yuuri, Okita Ayaka, Kushiro Rina, Shimizu Rika, Jo Eriko, Jonishi Rei, Takei Sara, Nakagawa Mion, Mizuta Shiori, Murase Sae, Morita Ayaka, Yagura Fuuko

=== "Good Timing" ===
"Good Timing" was performed by 5 members:

- Team N: Umeyama Cocona, Yamamoto Ayaka
- Team M: Iwata Momoka, Yamada Suzu
- Team BII: Jonishi Rei

=== "Gokai" ===
"Gokai" was performed by Shiroma Miru & Yagura Fuuko:

- Team M: Shiroma Miru
- Team BII: Yagura Fuuko
