= NMB48 =

Japanese idol group

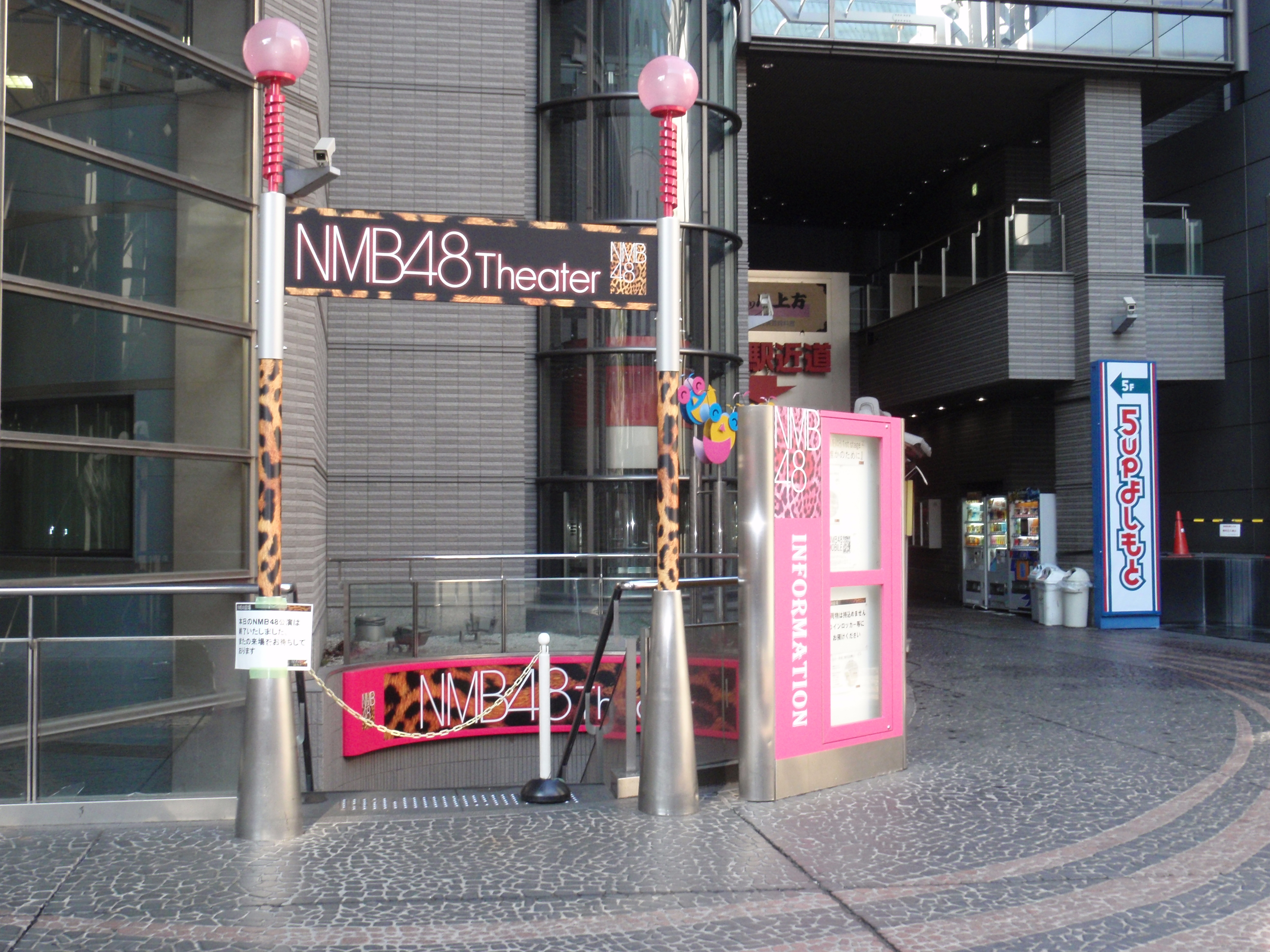
- NMB48劇場 (NMB48 Theater)

Background information
- Origin: Osaka, Japan
- Genres: J-pop; pop; Teen pop; Bubblegum pop
- Years active: 2011–present
- Labels: Laugh Out Loud Records (2011-2022); Universal Sigma (2022-present)
- Member of: AKB48 Group
- Members: Team N details Team M details Team BII details
- Website: www.nmb48.com

NMB48 (read "N.M.B. Forty-eight") is a Japanese idol group that debuted in 2011 as the second sister group to AKB48, produced by Yasushi Akimoto. NMB48 is named after the Namba district in Osaka city of Osaka Prefecture, where the group is based. The group performs at the NMB48 Theater, which is located in the basement of the Yes-Namba Building in Namba, Osaka. The group has sold over 9 million CDs in Japan.

== History ==
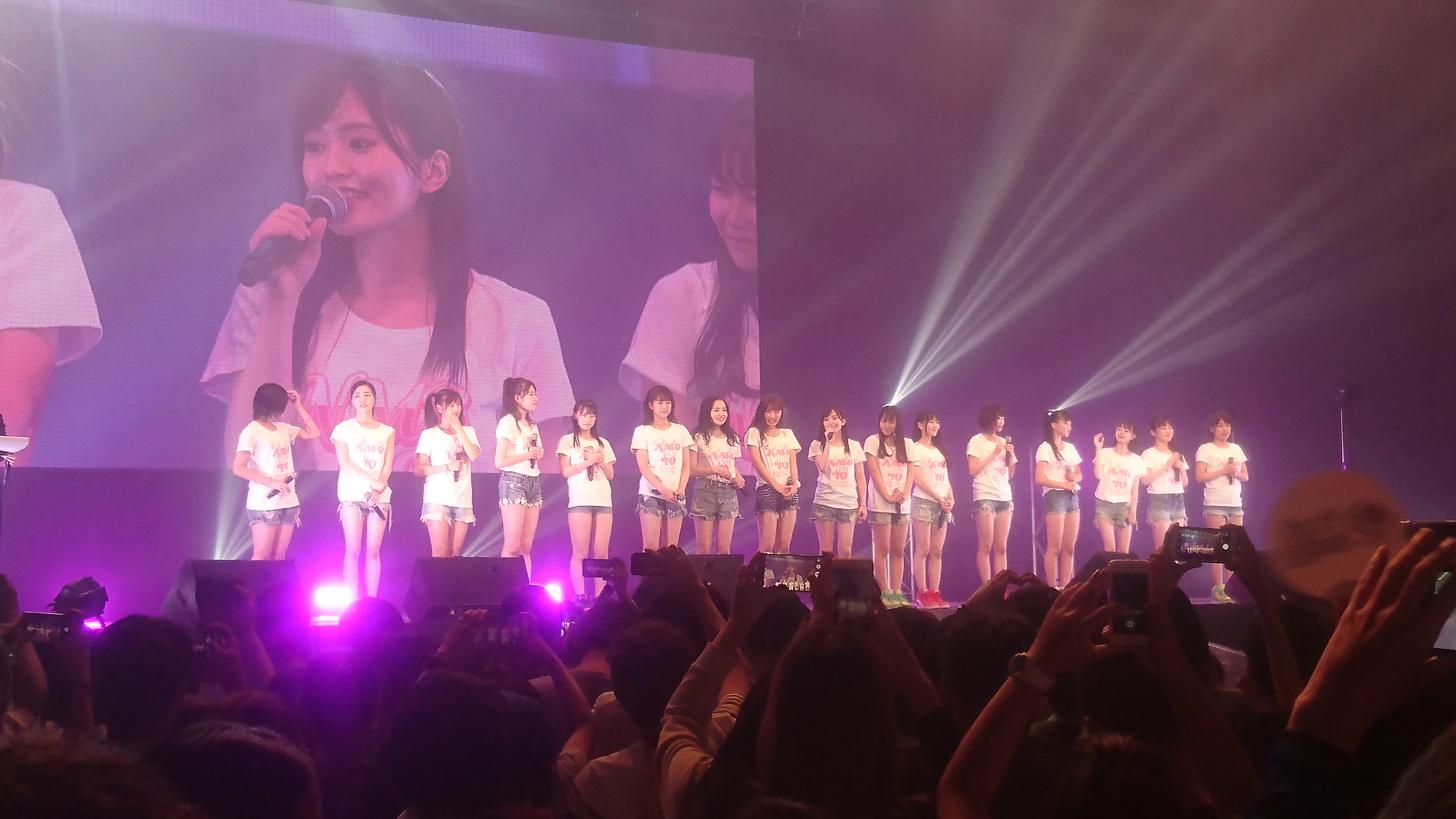
NMB48 during Asian tour in Bangkok 2017

2010

On July 10, 2010, AKB48 first announced that they would be forming a second sister national group, based in Namba. NMB48 officially became active on October 9, 2010. Yasushi Akimoto announced that the group would have 26 trainees for the first generation. These members made their first appearance at the AKB48 Tokyo Autumn Festival.

2011

NMB48 made their debut performance at their theater on New Year's Day 2011. They released their debut single, "Zetsumetsu Kurokami Shōjo", on July 20, 2011. In its debut week, the single sold a total of about 218,000 copies, making it the bestselling single on the Oricon weekly charts for the week of July 20–27, 2011. This makes NMB48 the second girl group after Passpo to reach number 1 with a debut single.

2012

On August 24, 2012, the first day of AKB48's Tokyo Dome Concert, it was revealed that Team A member Yui Yokoyama would also hold a position in NMB48. Miyuki Watanabe of Team N would hold a concurrent position in AKB48 Team B. Also, Riho Kotani of Team N will hold a concurrent position in AKB48, Team A.

On September 3, Eriko Jo, a member of Team M, announced that she would be leaving the group during the performance at the theater. Her "graduation" performance was on September 28 at the NMB48 Theater. Following Jo's graduation, two members from Team M announced their resignation in early October. On October 9, three trainees were promoted to Team M to replace the members who had left. Fuuko Yagura became the new "center" member of Team M.

On October 10, sixteen third-generation trainees formed Team BII. On December 19, Yui Yokoyama was promoted to Team N.

2013

On April 18, 2013, first-generation member Nana Yamada was transferred from Team N to Team M, and trainee members Naruma Koga and Aika Nishimura were promoted to Team N. At the AKB48 Group Concert in the Nippon Budokan on April 28, 2013, it was announced that Yui Yokoyama's concurrent position in the group would end, and that AKB48 Member Miori Ichikawa would have a concurrent position in Team N.

2014

In the AKB48 Group Daisokaku Matsuri held on February 24, 2014, major changes occurred to NMB48. Sayaka Yamamoto became a concurrent member of Team K. Miyuki Watanabe became a concurrent member of Team S, and was transferred from Team N to Team BII. Mayu Ogasawara was transferred completely to Team B, Nana Yamada became a concurrent member of Team KII.

On October 15, 2014, Nana Yamada announced her graduation on the group's 4th anniversary live and will graduate on April 3, 2015.

2015

On March 31, 2015, the group released their 11th single Don't look back!. This was Nana Yamada's first solo center, as well as her last time in a NMB48 single and senbatsu.

On July 15, 2015, the group released their 12th single Dorian Shōnen. This was Ririka Sutou's first center in senbatsu.

On October 7, 2015, the group released their 13th single Must be now.

2016

On April 13, 2016, Miyuki Watanabe announced her graduation from the group. On the same day Sayaka Yamamoto announced her resignation from AKB48's Team K.

On April 27, 2016, the group released their 14th single Amagami Hime.

On August 3, 2016, they released their 15th single Boku wa Inai. This was Miyuki Watanabe's last center in senbatsu as well as her last single with NMB48. The music video for the A-side was shot in Thailand.

On December 28, 2016, the group released their 16th single Boku Igai no Dareka.

2017

On December 27, 2017, the group released their 17th single Warota People. This was the first and only single to be released in that year.

2018

On April 4, 2018, the group released their 18th single Yokubomono.

On June 15, 2018, 6 members of NMB48 (Cocona Umeyama, Kokoro Naiki, Yuuka Kato, Miru Shiroma, Azusa Uemura and Sae Murase) joined Produce 48. Both Cocona Umeyama and Azusa Uemura withdrew from the show. Kokoro Naiki, Yuuka Kato, Sae Murase and Miru Shiroma ranked 87, 74, 22 and 20 respectively. None of them made it to the final line-up of Iz*One.

On July 30, 2018, Sayaka Yamamoto, captain of Team N announced in NMB48 LIVE TOUR 2018 in Summer that she would be graduating from NMB48.

On September 25, 2018, the group released the music video for their 19th single Boku Datte naichau yo, which was released on October 17, 2018.

2019

On February 20, 2019, the group released their 20th single Tokonoma Seiza Musume. Miru Shiroma is the center for this single. On August 14, 2019, the group released their 21st single Bokou e Kaere! which was their first single to release in the Reiwa period. On September 4, 2019, Yuuri Ota announced her graduation. On November 6, 2019, the group released their 22nd single Hatsukoi Shijo Shugi.

2020

On August 19, 2020, the group released their 23rd single Datte Datte Datte. The single originally scheduled to release on May 13, 2020, but was withdrawn at the height of COVID-19 pandemic.

2021

On January 1, 2021, a new project NAMBATTLE was announced as part of an effort to revitalize the group's image, which included the disbandment of Team N, Team M and Team BII. All members were assigned to one of 6 groups, decided by lottery drawings. The winner of the project would earn the opportunity to get a new song and music video as part of NMB48's next release, as well as a new theatre stage and adjusted media appearances.

2022

On January 1, 2022, the reformation of Team N, Team M and Team BII was announced to take effect from February. As the new Team BII is composed entirely of kenkyuusei members, they will start to be officially referred to as Team BII Kenkyuusei.

On the same date, the project NAMBATTLE 2 was also announced, which, alongside other programmes, also include a general election for NMB48 members that will be held on March 27, 2022. The winner of the event was Chihiro Kawakami with 21,462 votes, and she will subsequently be the center for NMB48's 27th single.

== Members ==
=== Team N ===
Team N is associated with the color Ochre Orange. The current captain is Haruka Sadano and the current vice-captain is Mai Hirayama.

Name	Birth date (age)	Election rank								
Name	Birth date (age)	AKB48 elections								NMB48 elections
Name	Birth date (age)	3	4	5	6	7	8	9	10	1
Yuumi Ishida (石田 優美, Ishida Yuumi)	October 12, 1998 (age 27)		N/A	N/A	N/A	N/A	N/A	N/A		15
Ayano Izumi (泉 綾乃, Izumi Ayano)	November 22, 2004 (age 21)								N/A	9
Rena Okamoto (岡本 怜奈, Okamoto Rena)	December 22, 2005 (age 20)									N/A
Yuuka Kato (加藤 夕夏, Kato Yuuka)	August 1, 1997 (age 29)		N/A	N/A	N/A	59	84	33	86	11
Karin Kojima (小嶋 花梨, Kojima Karin)	July 16, 1999 (age 27)							N/A	N/A	2
Haruka Sadano (貞野 遥香, Sadano Haruka)	June 30, 2002 (age 24)									7
Nagisa Shibuya (渋谷 凪咲, Shibuya Nagisa)	August 25, 1996 (age 29)			N/A	N/A	58	56	60	57	5
Nao Shinzawa (新澤 菜央, Shinzawa Nao)	August 2, 1998 (age 28)									14
Mion Nakagawa (中川 美音, Nakagawa Mion)	November 16, 2002 (age 23)							N/A	N/A	N/A
Mai Hirayama (平山 真衣, Hirayama Mai)	November 16, 2002 (age 23)									20
Haasa Minami (南 羽諒, Minami Haasa)	April 2, 2001 (age 25)								N/A	N/A
Mikana Yamamoto (山本 望叶, Yamamoto Mikana)	March 11, 2002 (age 24)								N/A	6
Miyu Wada (和田 海佑, Wada Miyu)	March 29, 1997 (age 29)									18

=== Team M ===
Team M is associated with the color Fuchsia Purple. The current captain is Karen Hara and the current co-captain is Wakana Abe.

Name	Birth date (age)	Election rank								
Name	Birth date (age)	AKB48 elections								NMB48 elections
Name	Birth date (age)	3	4	5	6	7	8	9	10	1
Wakana Abe (安部 若菜, Abe Wakana)	July 18, 2001 (age 25)								N/A	4
Mizuki Uno (鵜野 みずき, Uno Mizuki)	October 23, 1996 (age 29)		N/A	N/A	N/A	N/A	N/A	N/A		N/A
Chihiro Kawakami (川上 千尋, Kawakami Chihiro)	December 17, 1998 (age 27)			N/A	N/A	N/A	N/A	N/A	113	1
Keito Shiotsuki (塩月 希依音, Shiotsuki Keito)	December 15, 2005 (age 20)								N/A	12
Rei Jonishi (上西怜, Jonishi Rei)	May 28, 2001 (age 25)							N/A	98	3
Yuina Deguchi (出口結菜, Deguchi Yuina)	June 22, 2001 (age 25)									16
Mirai Nakano (中野 美来, Nakano Mirai)	December 10, 2002 (age 23)								N/A	N/A
Karen Hara (原 かれん, Hara Karen)	March 15, 2001 (age 25)									17
Shion Hori (堀 詩音, Hori Shion)	May 29, 1996 (age 30)						N/A	N/A	N/A	22
Yuzuha Hongo (本郷 柚巴, Hongo Yuzuha)	January 12, 2003 (age 23)						N/A	N/A	N/A	19
Reiko Maeda (前田 令子, Maeda Reiko)	September 26, 2000 (age 25)								N/A	8
Anju Manabe (眞鍋 杏樹, Manabe Anju)	June 10, 2002 (age 24)									N/A
Shiori Mizuta (水田 詩織, Mizuta Shiori)	December 21, 1998 (age 27)							N/A	N/A	N/A

=== Team BII Kenkyuusei ===
Team BII, officially referred to as Team BII Kenkyuusei as of January 1, 2022, is associated with the color Navy Blue. The current captain is Aika Satsuki and the current co-captain is Wakana Sumino. All of its current members are kenkyuusei.

Name	Birth date (age)	Election rank
Name	Birth date (age)	NMB48 elections
Name	Birth date (age)	1
Momoka Asao (浅尾 桃香, Asao Momoka)	February 6, 2004 (age 22)	21
Lee Siyeon (イ シヨン, I Shiyon)	May 16, 2000 (age 26)	N/A
Honoka Ike (池 帆乃香, Ike Honoka)	December 16, 2003 (age 22)	N/A
Zion Kameno (瓶野 神音, Kameno Zion)	September 2, 2007 (age 18)	13
Sakura Kuroshima (黒島 咲花, Kuroshima Sakura)	April 7, 2009 (age 17)	N/A
Fuuwa Kuroda (黒田 楓和, Kuroda Fuuwa)	September 19, 2004 (age 21)	24
Mako Sakashita (坂下 真心, Sakashita Mako)	August 2, 2005 (age 21)	N/A
Misaki Sakata (坂田 心咲, Sakata Misaki)	November 8, 2005 (age 20)	N/A
Risa Sakamoto (坂本 理紗, Sakamoto Risa)	December 24, 2008 (age 17)	N/A
Ayaka Sakurada (桜田 彩叶, Sakurada Ayaka)	March 25, 2002 (age 24)	N/A
Aika Satsuki (佐月 愛果, Satsuki Aika)	April 30, 2002 (age 24)	N/A
Wakana Sumino (隅野 和奏, Sumino Wakana)	July 16, 2003 (age 23)	10
Yayoi Tatsumoto (龍本 弥生, Tatsumoto Yayoi)	March 2, 2005 (age 21)	N/A
Yukino Tanaka (田中 雪乃, Tanaka Yukino)	November 16, 2007 (age 18)	N/A
Yuna Hayakawa (早川 夢菜, Hayakawa Yuna)	September 19, 2002 (age 23)	23
Ami Fukuno (福野 杏実, Fukuno Ami)	May 24, 2005 (age 21)	N/A
Sakura Matsuoka (松岡 さくら, Matsuoka Sakura)	June 24, 2003 (age 23)	N/A
Mio Matsuno (松野 美桜, Matsuno Mio)	April 4, 2001 (age 25)	N/A
Mihina Matsumoto (松本 海日菜, Matsumoto Mihina)	May 22, 2008 (age 18)	N/A
Hikaru Yamamoto (山本 光, Yamamoto Hikaru)	May 23, 2006 (age 20)	N/A
Misaki Yoshino (芳野 心咲, Yoshino Misaki)	January 13, 2008 (age 18)	N/A

== Graduated members ==
=== Team N ===
Name _{(Birthdate)}	Election										Notes
Name _{(Birthdate)}	1	2	3	4	5	6	7	8	9	10	Notes
Ayaka Mori (森 彩華) (May 23, 1996)			N/A								Graduated on June 25, 2011.
Shiori Matsuda (松田 栞) (June 18, 1995)			N/A	N/A							Graduated on October 24, 2012.
Kanna Shinohara (篠原 栞那) (September 22, 1997)			N/A	N/A							Graduated on April 12, 2013.
Yui Yokoyama (横山 由依) (December 8, 1992)		N/A	19	15	13	13	10	11	7	6	Canceled concurrent position with NMB48 on May 20, 2013.
Aina Fukumoto (福本 愛菜) (March 25, 1993)			N/A	43							Graduated on July 1, 2013.
Keira Yogi (與儀 ケイラ) (October 18, 1999)				N/A	N/A	N/A					Graduated on July 2, 2014.
Tsubasa Yamauchi (山内 つばさ) (June 6, 2000)				N/A	N/A	N/A					Graduated on January 26, 2015.
Natsumi Yamagishi (山岸 奈津美) (September 16, 1994)			N/A	N/A	N/A	N/A					Graduated on March 12, 2015.
Saki Kono (河野 早紀) (June 18, 1994)				N/A	N/A	N/A					Graduated on April 30, 2015.
Yuki Kashiwagi (柏木 由紀) (July 15, 1991)	9	8	3	3	4	3	2	5			Canceled concurrent position with NMB48 on March 26, 2015.
Anna Murashige (村重 杏奈) (July 29, 1998)				N/A	N/A	67	N/A	80	100		Canceled concurrent position with NMB48 on March 26, 2015.
Kanako Muro (室 加奈子) (November 20, 1996)				N/A	N/A	N/A					Graduated on June 16, 2015.
Riho Kotani (小谷 里歩) (August 24, 1994)			N/A	N/A	N/A	61	54				Graduated on February 4, 2016.
Aika Nishimura (西村 愛華) (January 12, 1998)						N/A	N/A				Graduated on April 11, 2016.
Rika Kishino (岸野 里香) (June 4, 1994)			N/A	N/A		N/A	N/A	66			Graduated on October 15, 2016.
Kei Jonishi (上西 恵) (March 18, 1995)			N/A	N/A	40	58	36				Graduated on April 18, 2017.
Shu Yabushita (薮下 柊) (December 2, 1998)				N/A	49	59	60	39			Graduated on April 19, 2017.
Ririka Sutou (須藤 凜々花) (November 23, 1996)						N/A	N/A	44	20		Graduated on August 30, 2017.
Megumi Matsumura (松村 芽久未) (June 26, 1995)					N/A	N/A	N/A	N/A	N/A		Graduated on December 24, 2017.
Mirai Mizokawa (溝川 実来) (May 13, 2004)									N/A		Graduated on March 28, 2018.
Miori Ichikawa (市川 美織) (February 12, 1994)			39	58	57	53	79	81	61		Graduated on May 1, 2018.
Sayaka Yamamoto (山本 彩) (July 14, 1993)			28	18	14	6	6	4			Graduated on November 4, 2018.
Konomi Kusaka (日下 このみ) (January 12, 1996)				N/A	N/A	N/A	N/A	N/A	N/A		Graduated on January 28, 2019.
Momoka Hayashi (林 萌々香) (September 11, 1998)				N/A	N/A	N/A	N/A	N/A	N/A		Graduated on February 13, 2019.
Mao Mita (三田 麻央) (September 9, 1995)				N/A	N/A	N/A	N/A	N/A	N/A		Graduated on February 24, 2019.
Kanae Iso (磯 佳奈江) (August 9, 1993)						N/A	N/A	N/A	N/A	N/A	Graduated on September 13, 2019.
Mai Odan (大段 舞依) (October 4, 1994)					N/A	N/A	N/A	N/A	N/A		Graduated on October 13, 2019.
Sara Takei (武井紗良) (October 6, 1998)						N/A	N/A	N/A	N/A	N/A	Graduated on October 16, 2019.
Yuuri Ota (太田 夢莉) (December 1, 1999)				N/A	N/A	N/A	N/A	52	27	23	Graduated on November 30, 2019.
Airi Tanigawa (谷川 愛梨) (December 5, 1995)				N/A	N/A	N/A	74		57	102	Graduated on December 25, 2019.
Riona Ota (大田 莉央奈) (March 12, 2003)										N/A	Graduated on February 2, 2020.
Rina Kobayashi (小林 莉奈) (April 20, 2001)											Graduated on June 29, 2020.
Ayaka Morita (森田 彩花) (May 29, 1995)					N/A	N/A	N/A	N/A	N/A	N/A	Graduated on October 6, 2020.
Rurina Nishizawa (西澤 瑠莉奈) (July 27, 1999)				N/A	N/A	N/A	N/A	N/A	N/A	N/A	Graduated on October 15, 2020.
Akari Yoshida (吉田 朱里) (August 16, 1996)			N/A	N/A	50	72	64	77	16	14	Graduated on December 21, 2020.
Sae Murase (村瀬 紗英) (March 30, 1997)				N/A	N/A	N/A	N/A	88	39	90	Graduated on December 23, 2020.
Nami Sakamoto (坂本 夏海) (July 21, 1999)										N/A	Graduated on January 11, 2021.
Kotone Sugiura (杉浦 琴音) (December 18, 2000)										N/A	Graduated on February 6, 2021.

=== Team M ===
Name _{(Birthdate)}	Election								Notes
Name _{(Birthdate)}	3	4	5	6	7	8	9	10	Notes
Yuka Kodakari (小鷹 狩佑香) (August 5, 1997)									Graduated on May 6, 2012.
Eriko Jo (城 恵理子) (November 27, 1998)		N/A		N/A	N/A	N/A	89	79	Graduated on September 28, 2012, later returned to NMB48 as a Kenkyuusei on October 13, 2013.
Runa Fujita (藤田 留奈) (November 25, 1997)		N/A							Graduated on October 3, 2012.
Riona Ota (太田 里織菜) (December 31, 1996)	N/A	N/A							Graduated on October 25, 2012.
Ayame Hikawa (肥川 彩愛) (November 8, 1994)	N/A	N/A							Graduated on December 22, 2012.
Hitomi Yamamoto (山本 ひとみ) (November 8, 1998)		N/A							Graduated on May 30, 2013.
Arisa Koyanagi (小柳 有沙) (April 28, 1995)	N/A	N/A							Graduated on February 7, 2014.
Rena Shimada (島田 玲奈) (August 5, 1993)		N/A	N/A						Graduated on April 7, 2014.
Ayaka Murakami (村上 文香) (June 2, 1993)		N/A	N/A	N/A					Graduated on March 13, 2015.
Arisa Miura (三浦 亜莉沙) (July 20, 1996)		N/A	N/A	N/A					Graduated on March 16, 2015.
Nana Yamada (山田 菜々) (April 3, 1992)	N/A	46	28	29					Graduated on April 3, 2015.
Yui Takano (高野 祐衣) (December 6, 1993)		N/A	N/A	N/A					Graduated on July 13, 2015.
Rina Kondo (近藤 里奈) (February 23, 1997)	N/A	N/A	N/A	N/A	N/A				Graduated on January 27, 2016.
Emika Kamieda (上枝 恵美加) (July 13, 1994)		N/A	N/A	N/A		N/A			Graduated on July 31, 2017.
Momoka Kinoshita (木下 百花) (February 6, 1997)	N/A	N/A	N/A						Graduated on September 27, 2017.
Reina Nakano (中野 麗来) (August 24, 1999)			N/A	N/A	N/A	N/A	N/A		Graduated on May 2, 2018.
Erina Ando (安藤 愛璃菜) (November 21, 2003)						N/A	N/A		Graduated on August 20, 2018.
Momoka Iwata (岩田 桃夏) (July 2, 2001)							N/A	N/A	Graduated on April 14, 2019.
Rena Kawakami (川上 礼奈) (September 16, 1995)	N/A	N/A	N/A	N/A	N/A	N/A	N/A	116	Graduated on October 30, 2019.
Rina Kushiro (久代 梨奈) (January 29, 1999)		N/A	N/A	N/A	N/A	N/A	N/A	N/A	Graduated on October 31, 2019.
Narumi Koga (古賀 成美) (March 30, 1998)	N/A	N/A	N/A	N/A	N/A	N/A	N/A		Graduated on December 2, 2019.
Rina Yamao (山尾 梨奈) (December 10, 1995)			N/A	N/A	N/A	N/A		N/A	Graduated on January 29, 2020.
Ami Sato (佐藤 亜海) (March 15, 2000)								N/A	Graduated on January 30, 2020.
Natsuko Akashi (明石 奈津子) (August 17, 1999)			N/A	N/A	N/A	N/A	N/A		Graduated on June 28, 2020.
Momoka Horinouchi (堀ノ内 百香) (February 10, 2003)									Graduated on June 28, 2020.
Maria Mizobuchi (溝渕 麻莉亜) (May 12, 1999)								N/A	Graduated on September 14, 2020.
Anna Ijiri (井尻晏菜) (January 20, 1995)	N/A	N/A	N/A	N/A	N/A	N/A	N/A	N/A	Graduated on December 27, 2020.
Cocona Umeyama (梅山 恋和) (August 7, 2003)							N/A	N/A	Graduated on April 4, 2022.
Amiru Yamasaki (山崎 亜美瑠) (July 21, 2001)								N/A	Graduated on April 13, 2022.

=== Team BII ===
Name _{(Birthdate)}	Election											Notes
Name _{(Birthdate)}	AKB48 elections										NMB48 elections	Notes
Name _{(Birthdate)}	1	2	3	4	5	6	7	8	9	10	1	Notes
Mako Umehara (梅原 真子) (January 11, 1999)				N/A	N/A							Graduated on February 21, 2014.
Rikako Kobayashi (小林 莉加子) (May 24, 1996)				N/A	N/A							Graduated on April 10, 2014.
Hono Akazawa (赤澤 萌乃) (January 29, 1997)				N/A	N/A							Graduated on April 16, 2014.
Akane Takayanagi (高柳 明音) (November 29, 1991)	N/A	35	23	24	23	31	14	20	15	18		Canceled concurrent position with NMB48 on March 26, 2015.
Honoka Terui (照井 穂乃佳) (October 18, 1998)					N/A	N/A						Graduated on June 30, 2015.
Kanako Kadowaki (門脇 佳奈子) (October 24, 1996)			N/A	N/A	N/A	N/A	N/A					Graduated on February 29, 2016.
Ayaka Umeda (梅田 彩佳) (January 3, 1989)	N/A	32	22	16	19	35	56					Graduated on March 31, 2016.
Miyuki Watanabe (渡辺 美優紀) (September 19, 1993)			N/A	19	15	18	12					Graduated on August 9, 2016.
Mirei Ueda (植田 碧麗) (February 2, 1999)				N/A	N/A	N/A	N/A	N/A				Graduated on September 30, 2016.
Chiho Matsuoka (松岡 知穂) (April 21, 1998)					N/A	N/A	N/A	N/A				Graduated on October 23, 2016.
Haruna Kinoshita (木下 春奈) (June 9, 1998)			N/A	N/A	N/A	N/A	N/A					Graduated on October 21, 2016.
Yuki Yamaguchi (山口 夕輝) (October 17, 1993)			N/A	N/A	N/A	N/A	N/A					Graduated on April 28, 2017.
Reina Fujie (藤江 れいな) (February 1, 1994)	N/A	33	40	40	32	33	35	41				Graduated on May 27, 2017.
Yuki Muranaka (村中 有基) (March 4, 1997)								N/A				Graduated on July 7, 2017.
Fuuko Yagura (矢倉 楓子) (February 24, 1997)				N/A	44	41	40	33				Graduated on April 10, 2018.
Ayaka Okita (沖田 彩華) (October 11, 1995)			N/A	N/A	N/A	N/A	N/A	25	48			Graduated on September 6, 2018.
Azusa Uemura (植村 梓) (February 4, 1999)						N/A	N/A	N/A	N/A	N/A		Graduated on December 3, 2018.
Eriko Jo (城 恵理子) (November 27, 1998)				N/A		N/A	N/A	N/A	89	79		Graduated as a member of Team M on September 28, 2012, later returned to NMB48 as a Kenkyuusei on October 13, 2013. Graduated as a member of Team BII on May 11, 2019
Kokoro Naiki (内木 志) (April 6, 1997)						N/A	N/A	N/A	N/A	54		Graduated on August 11, 2019.
Suzu Yamada (山田 寿々) (December 11, 2001)									N/A	N/A		Graduated on December 22, 2020.
Koharu Orisaka (折坂 心春) (March 6, 2002)												Graduated on January 31, 2022.
Sae Takahashi (高橋 紗恵) (October 31, 2003)											N/A	Resigned on May 12, 2022.

=== NMB48 Promoted Members ===
Name _{(Birthdate)}	Election								Notes
Name _{(Birthdate)}	3	4	5	6	7	8	9	10	Notes
Yuki Azuma (東 由樹) (February 17, 1996)		N/A	N/A	N/A	N/A	N/A	N/A	N/A	Graduated on February 22, 2021.
Ayaka Yamamoto (山本 彩加) (August 6, 2002)							N/A	111	Graduated on March 19, 2021.
Sumire Yokono (横野 すみれ) (December 12, 2000)									Graduated on May 23, 2021.
Yuuka Ogawa (小川 結夏) (June 24, 1998)									Graduated on May 31, 2021.
Mana Kitamura (北村 真菜) (July 4, 2005)									Graduated on June 11, 2021.
Rika Shimizu (清水 里香) (September 15, 1998)							N/A	N/A	Graduated on June 15, 2021.
Yuria Miyake (三宅 ゆりあ) (May 16, 2005)									Graduated on February 22, 2021.
Miru Shiroma (白間 美瑠) (October 14, 1997)	N/A	N/A	N/A	43	34	24	12	20	Graduated on August 31, 2021.
Akari Ishizuka (石塚 朱莉) (July 11, 1997)		N/A	N/A	N/A	N/A		N/A	N/A	Graduated on September 17, 2021.
Hinata Namba (南波 陽向) (April 12, 2001)									Graduated on February 22, 2021.
Nanaho Kawano (河野 奈々帆) (May 18, 2002)								N/A	Graduated on November 30, 2021.
Marin Shōbu (菖蒲 まりん) (December 29, 1999)									Resigned on December 12, 2021.
Momone Yasuda (安田 桃寧) (June 8, 2001)						N/A	N/A	N/A	Graduated on December 29, 2021.

== Discography ==
=== Studio albums ===
List of studio albums, with selected chart positions, sales and certifications
Title	Details	Peak chart positions	Sales			Certifications
Title	Details	JPN	Oricon		Billboard Japan	Certifications
Title	Details	JPN	First week	Total	Billboard Japan	Certifications
Teppen Tottande! (てっぺんとったんで!)	Released: February 27, 2013; Label: Laugh Out Loud! Records; Formats: CD, CD+DVD, digital download	1	328,436	421,129	—N/a	RIAJ: ×2 Platinum
Sekai no Chūshin wa Osaka ya: Namba Jichiku (世界の中心は大阪や～なんば自治区～)	Released: August 13, 2014; Label: Laugh Out Loud! Records; Formats: CD, CD+DVD, digital download	2	325,249	399,721	—N/a	RIAJ: Platinum
Namba Ai: Ima, Omou Koto (難波愛～今、思うこと～)	Released: August 2, 2017; Label: Laugh Out Loud! Records; Formats: CD, CD+DVD, digital download	2	159,387	203,303	214,316	RIAJ: Gold
NMB13	Released: March 8, 2023; Label: Universal Music; Formats: CD, CD+DVD, digital download	1	138,869		174,814	RIAJ: Gold

=== Stage albums ===
List of stage albums, with selected chart positions
Title	Details	Peak chart positions
Title	Details	JPN
Team N 1st Stage "Dareka no Tame ni" (Team N 1st Stage「誰かのために」)	Released: January 1, 2014; Label: Laugh Out Loud!; Formats: CD, digital download	18
Team N 2nd Stage "Seishun Girls" (Team N 2nd Stage「青春ガールズ」)	Released: January 1, 2014; Label: Laugh Out Loud!; Formats: CD, digital download	24
Team M 1st Stage "Idol no Yoake" (Team M 1st Stage「アイドルの夜明け」)	Released: January 1, 2014; Label: Laugh Out Loud!; Formats: CD, digital download	27
Team BII 1st Stage "Aitakatta" (Team BII 1st Stage「会いたかった」)	Released: January 1, 2014; Label: Laugh Out Loud!; Formats: CD, digital download	33
Team BII 2nd Stage "Tadaima Ren'ai Chū" (Team BII 2nd Stage「ただいま恋愛中」)	Released: January 1, 2014; Label: Laugh Out Loud!; Formats: CD, digital download	32
Team N 3rd Stage "Koko ni Datte Tenshi wa Iru" (Team N 3rd Stage「ここにだって天使はいる」)	Released: March 31, 2014; Label: Laugh Out Loud!; Formats: CD, digital download	21
Theater Performance CD "Angel's Utopia" (劇場公演CD『天使のユートピア』)	Released: August 2, 2024; Label: Laugh Out Loud!; Formats: CD, digital download	10

=== Singles ===
List of singles, with selected chart positions, showing year released, sales, certifications and album name
No.	Title	Year	Peak chart positions		Sales			Certifications	Albums
No.	Title	Year	JPN	JPN Hot	Oricon		Billboard Japan	Certifications	Albums
No.	Title	Year	JPN	JPN Hot	First week	Total	Billboard Japan	Certifications	Albums
1	"Zetsumetsu Kurokami Shōjo" (絶滅黒髪少女)	2011	1	2	218,441	267,810	—N/a	RIAJ: Platinum (phy.)	Teppen Tottande!
2	"Oh My God!" (オーマイガー!)	2011	1	3	265,435	325,784	—N/a	RIAJ: Platinum (phy.); RIAJ: Gold (dig.)	Teppen Tottande!
3	"Junjō U-19" (純情U-19)	2012	1	1	329,438	376,563	—N/a	RIAJ: Platinum (phy.)	Teppen Tottande!
4	"Nagiichi" (ナギイチ)	2012	2	2	375,785	451,489	—N/a	RIAJ: Platinum (phy.)	Teppen Tottande!
5	"Virginity" (ヴァージニティー)	2012	1	1	315,205	396,543	—N/a	RIAJ: Platinum (phy.)	Teppen Tottande!
6	"Kitagawa Kenji" (北川謙二)	2012	1	1	317,051	410,269	—N/a	RIAJ: Platinum (phy.)	Teppen Tottande!
7	"Bokura no Eureka" (僕らのユリイカ)	2013	1	1	481,843	558,892	—N/a	RIAJ: 2× Platinum (phy.)	Sekai no Chūshin wa Osaka ya: Namba Jichiku
8	"Kamonegikkusu" (カモネギックス)	2013	1	1	374,644	509,210	—N/a	RIAJ: 2× Platinum (phy.)	Sekai no Chūshin wa Osaka ya: Namba Jichiku
9	"Takane no Ringo" (高嶺の林檎)	2014	1	1	406,579	451,949	—N/a	RIAJ: 2× Platinum (phy.)	Sekai no Chūshin wa Osaka ya: Namba Jichiku
10	"Rashikunai" (らしくない)	2014	1	2	420,326	499,659	—N/a	RIAJ: 2× Platinum (phy.)	Namba Ai: Ima, Omou Koto
11	"Don't Look Back!"	2015	2	1	447,282	532,379	—N/a	RIAJ: 3× Platinum (phy.)	Namba Ai: Ima, Omou Koto
12	"Durian Shōnen" (ドリアン少年)	2015	1	2	371,276	450,301	—N/a	RIAJ: 2× Platinum (phy.)	Namba Ai: Ima, Omou Koto
13	"Must Be Now"	2015	1	1	307,036	418,060	—N/a	RIAJ: 2× Platinum (phy.)	Namba Ai: Ima, Omou Koto
14	"Amagami Hime" (甘噛み姫)	2016	1	1	230,163	293,812	341,556	RIAJ: Platinum (phy.)	Namba Ai: Ima, Omou Koto
15	"Boku wa Inai" (僕はいない)	2016	1	1	304,315	363,583	450,771	RIAJ: Platinum (phy.)	Namba Ai: Ima, Omou Koto
16	"Boku Igai no Dareka" (僕以外の誰か)	2016	1	2	266,813	321,458	442,134	RIAJ: Platinum (phy.)	Namba Ai: Ima, Omou Koto
17	"Warota People" (ワロタピーポー)	2017	1	1	273,499	338,133	381,349	RIAJ: Platinum (phy.)	NMB13
18	"Yokubomono" (欲望者)	2018	1	1	193,740	271,856	308,673	RIAJ: Platinum (phy.)	NMB13
19	"Boku Datte Naichau yo" (僕だって泣いちゃうよ)	2018	1	1	238,269	347,928	410,738	RIAJ: Platinum (phy.)	NMB13
20	"Tokonoma Seiza Musume" (床の間正座娘)	2019	1	1	196,592	339,477	410,960	RIAJ: Platinum (phy.)	NMB13
21	"Bokō e Kaere!" (母校へ帰れ!)	2019	1	1	195,471	211,228	348,701	RIAJ: Platinum (phy.)	NMB13
22	"Hatsukoi Shijo Shugi" (初恋至上主義)	2019	1	1	166,684	199,840	316,716	RIAJ: Gold (phy.)	NMB13
23	"Datte Datte Datte" (だってだってだって)	2020	2	2	197,317		242,480	RIAJ: Platinum (phy.)	NMB13
24	"Koi Nanka No Thank You!" (恋なんかNo thank you!)	2020	1	2	130,416		170,474	RIAJ: Gold (phy.)	NMB13
25	"Shidare Yanagi" (シダレヤナギ)	2021	2	3	133,931		193,337	RIAJ: Gold (phy.)	NMB13
26	"Koi to Ai no Sono Aida ni wa" (恋と愛のその間には)	2022	1	2	152,131		239,446	RIAJ: Gold (phy.)	NMB13
27	"Suki da Mushi" (好きだ虫)	2022	1	3	160,972		259,215	RIAJ: Platinum (phy.)	NMB13
28	"Nagisa Saikō!" (渚サイコー!)	2023	1	5	205,228		354,087	RIAJ: Platinum (phy.)	TBA
29	"Kore ga Ai Nanoka?" (これが愛なのか?)	2024	2	6	203,488		280,540	RIAJ: Platinum (phy.)	TBA
30	"Ganbaranuwai" (がんばらぬわい)	2024	2	2	203,488		375,809	RIAJ: Platinum (phy.)	TBA
31	"Chū Strike" (チューストライク)	2025	1	4	175,442		380,812	RIAJ: Platinum (phy.)	TBA
32	"Seishun no Deadline" (青春のデッドライン)	2025	2	3	133,731			RIAJ: Platinum (phy.)	TBA
33	"Hajimete no All" (初めてのオール)	2026	2	2	118,239			RIAJ: Platinum (phy.)	TBA

== See also ==
- Yoshimoto Kogyo
