= Warota People =

Single by NMB48
- A-side: "Warota People"
- Released: 27 December 2017
- Genre: J-pop
- Length: 4:29
- Label: laugh out loud records

NMB48 singles chronology
"Boku Igai no Dareka" (2016)	"Warota People" (2017)	"Yokubomono" (2018)

Music video
- Warota People (full version)

"Warota People" (ワロタピーポー) is the 17th single by Japanese idol girl group NMB48. It was released on 27 December 2017. It reached number-one on the weekly Oricon Singles Chart with 273,499 copies sold. It also reached the first place on the Billboard Japan Hot 100.

== Track listing ==
=== Type A ===
CD+DVD: YRCS-90136 / YRBS-80166
No.	Title	Length
1.	"Warota People"
2.	"Jibun no Iro (2nd Generation)"
3.	"Doko ka de Kiss wo (Team N)"
4.	"Warota People (off vocal)"
5.	"Jibun no Iro (off vocal)"
6.	"Doko ka de Kiss wo (off vocal)"

=== Type B ===
CD+DVD: YRCS-90137 / YRBS-80167
No.	Title	Length
1.	"Warota People"
2.	"Jibun no Iro (2nd Generation)"
3.	"Hontou no Jibun no Kyokaisen (Team M)"
4.	"Warota People (off vocal)"
5.	"Jibun no Iro (off vocal)"
6.	"Hontou no Jibun no Kyokaisen (off vocal)"

=== Type C ===
CD+DVD: YRCS-90138 / YRBS-80168
No.	Title	Length
1.	"Warota People"
2.	"Jibun no Iro (2nd Generation)"
3.	"Futsuu no Mizu (Team BII)"
4.	"Warota People (off vocal)"
5.	"Jibun no Iro (off vocal)"
6.	"Futsuu no Mizu (off vocal)"

=== Type D ===
CD+DVD: YRCS-90139 / YRBS-80169
No.	Title	Length
1.	"Warota People"
2.	"Jibun no Iro (2nd Generation)"
3.	"Which one"
4.	"Warota People (off vocal)"
5.	"Jibun no Iro (off vocal)"
6.	"Which one (off vocal)"

=== Theater version ===
CD: YRCS-90140
No.	Title	Length
1.	"Warota People"
2.	"Jibun no Iro (2nd Generation)"
3.	"Mou Ichido, Hashiridashite Miyou ka? (Jo Eriko)"
4.	"Warota People (off vocal)"
5.	"Jibun no Iro (off vocal)"
6.	"Mou Ichido, Hashiridashite Miyou ka? (off vocal)"

NOTE: Theater version doesn't include a Bonus DVD

== Personnel ==
=== "Warota People (Senbatsu)" ===
The performers of the main single are:

- Team N: Ichikawa Miori, Tanigawa Airi, Yamamoto Ayaka, Yamamoto Sayaka
- Team M: Iwata Momoka, Kato Yuuka, Shibuya Nagisa, Shiroma Miru, Yoshida Akari
- Team BII: Uemura Azusa, Ota Yuuri, Okita Ayaka, Jo Eriko, Jonishi Rei, Murase Sae, Yagura Fuuko

The member marked in RED is the song center

=== "Jibun no Iro" ===
"Jibun no Iro" was performed by NMB48 2nd Generation members, consisting of:

- Team N: Azuma Yuki, Koga Narumi, Tanigawa Airi, Hayashi Momoka, Mita Mao
- Team M: Ishida Yuumi, Uno Mizuki, Nishizawa Rurina
- Team BII: Jo Eriko, Murase Sae, Yagura Fuuko

=== "Doko ka de Kiss wo" ===
"Doko ka de Kiss wo" was performed by Team N members, consisting of:

- Team N: Azuma Yuki, Ichikawa Miori, Umeyama Cocona, Kusaka Konomi, Koga Narumi, Kojima Karin, Tanigawa Airi, Naiki Kokoro, Hayashi Momoka, Hori Shion, Hongou Yuzuha, Matsumura Megumi, Mizokawa Mirai, Mita Mao, Yamao Rina, Yamamoto Ayaka, Yamamoto Sayaka

=== "Hontou no Jibun no Kyokaisen" ===
"Hontou no Jibun no Kyokaisen" was performed by Team M members, consisting of:

- Team M: Ishida Yuumi, Iso Kanae, Iwata Momoka, Uno Mizuki, Odan Mai, Kato Yuuka, Kawakami Chihiro, Kawakami Rena, Shibuya Nagisa, Shiroma Miru, Nakano Reina, Nishizawa Rurina, Yasuda Momone, Yamada Suzu, Yoshida Akari

=== "Futsuu no Mizu" ===
"Futsuu no Mizu" was performed by Team BII members, consisting of:

- Team BII: Akashi Natsuko, Ishizuka Akari, Ijiri Anna, Uemura Azusa, Ota Yuuri, Okita Ayaka, Kushiro Rina, Shimizu Rika, Jo Eriko, Jonishi Rei, Takei Sara, Nakagawa Mion, Mizuta Shiori, Murase Sae, Morita Ayaka, Yagura Fuuko

=== "Which one" ===
"Which one" was performed by 5 members:

- Team M: Shibuya Nagisa, Yoshida Akari
- Team BII: Uemura Azusa, Ota Yuuri, Murase Sae

=== "Mou Ichido, Hashiridashite Miyou ka?" ===
"Mou Ichido, Hashiridashite Miyou ka?" was performed by Jo Eriko:

- Team BII: Jo Eriko
