= Miru Shiroma =

Japanese gravure idol and YouTuber

Miru Shiroma 白間 美瑠
- Also known as: Mirurun
- Born: 14 October 1997 (age 28)
- Origin: Osaka Prefecture, Japan
- Genre: J-pop
- Occupations: Gravure idol; YouTuber
- Instrument: Vocals
- Years active: 2010–present
- Label: Universal Music Japan
- Formerly of: NMB48 (2010–2021)
- Website: https://shiromamiru.jp/

YouTube information
- Channel: Mirurun Channel
- Years active: 2020–present
- Genres: vlog; comedy; music
- Subscribers: 136 thousand
- Views: 16.4 million
- Last updated: 22 September 2026

Miru Shiroma (白間 美瑠, Shiroma Miru; born 14 October 1997 in Osaka Prefecture) is a Japanese gravure idol and YouTuber. She is a former member of Team M of the Japanese idol girl group NMB48.

== Career ==
Shiroma passed NMB48's first-generation auditions in September 2010, debuting on 9 October 2010 at Tokyo Aki Matsuri. Her stage debut was on 1 January 2011. In March 2011, Shiroma was selected to form Team N. In February 2014, during the AKB48 Group Shuffle, it was announced she would be transferred to Team M. In the 2014 general elections, Shiroma ranked for the first time, placing 43rd with 17,745 votes. In September 2014, during AKB48's 2014 Janken Tournament, it was announced she would be selected for AKB48's 38th single Kibōteki Refrain. In the same month, it was also announced she and Fuuko Yagura would be the centers for NMB48's 10th single Rashikunai.

In May 2018, she participated in the reality television series Produce 48 and ranked 20th, unable to debut with the show's project group Iz*One. In 2019, her first photobook, "LOVE RUSH", was released. In November 2019, Shiroma acted in Battles Withoshut Honor and Humanity: On'na-tachi no Shitō-hen, a stage adaptation of the Battles Without Honor and Humanity yakuza film series. She played the role of Tetsuya Sakai, based on Hiroki Matsukata's original portrayal.

On 2 March 2021, during the finale of the NAMBATTLE project at the Orix Theater, Shiroma announced her graduation from NMB48 – the last first-generation member to do so. Her graduation concert took place at the Osaka Castle Hall on 15 August. She officially graduated from the group on 31 August, with one last performance at the NMB48 Theater.

On 14 January 2022, it was announced that Shiroma would make her solo artist debut under Universal Music Japan. Her debut single, "Shine Bright", was released on 6 July and ranked 13th on the weekly Oricon Singles Chart.

On 25 May 2023, Shiroma was revealed to be a contestant on Mnet reality program Queendom Puzzle. On 8 August 2023, she was eliminated and ranked 17th in the show with 290,370 points.

== Discography ==
=== Singles ===
Title	Year	Peak chart positions	Sales	Notes
Title	Year	JPN	Sales	Notes
"Shine Bright"	2022	13	JPN: 2,666	Solo debut single
"Melty"	2022	28	JPN: 2,081	

== Appearances ==
=== Stage units ===
NMB48 Team N 1st Stage "Dareka no Tame ni" (誰かのために)

1. "Nage Kiss de Uchi Otose!" (投げキッスで撃ち落せ!)

NMB48 Team N 2nd Stage "Seishun Girls" (青春ガールズ)

1. "Ame no Dobutsuen" (雨の動物園)

NMB48 Team N 3rd Stage "Koko ni Datte Tenshi wa Iru" (ここにだって天使はいる)

1. "Onew no Uwabaki" (おNEWの上履き)
2. "Hajimete no Hoshi" (初めての星)
3. "100nen Saki Demo" (100年先でも)

NMB48 Team M 2nd Stage "Reset"

1. "Gyakuten Oujisama" (逆転王子様)

=== TV variety ===
- NMB48 Geinin! (NMB48 げいにん!) (2012)
- NMB to Manabukun (NMBとまなぶくん) (2013– )
- AKBingo! (2015–2018)
- Produce 48 (2018)
- Queendom Puzzle (2023)

=== TV dramas ===
- Majisuka Gakuen 4 (マジすか学園4) (2015) as Shirogiku
- Majisuka Gakuen 5 (マジすか学園5) (2015) as Shirogiku
- AKB Horror Night: Adrenline's Night (AKBホラーナイト アドレナリンの夜) Ep.15 – Hole (2015)
- AKB Love Night: Love Factory (AKBラブナイト 恋工場) Ep.2 – Forbidden Mischief (2016) as Fumika
- Cabasuka Gakuen (キャバすか学園) (2016), Shirogiku

=== Movies ===
- NMB48 Geinin! The Movie Owarai Seishun Girls! (NMB48 げいにん!THE MOVIE お笑い青春ガールズ!) (2013)
