= Boku Igai no Dareka =

- Cover of Type A edition.

Single by NMB48
- A-side: "Boku Igai no Dareka"
- Released: 28 December 2016
- Genre: J-pop
- Length: 3:52
- Label: laugh out loud records

NMB48 singles chronology
"Boku wa Inai" (2016)	"Boku Igai no Dareka" (2016)	"Warota People" (2017)

Music video
- Boku Igai no Dareka (short version)

"Boku Igai no Dareka" (僕以外の誰か) is the 16th single by Japanese idol girl group NMB48. It was released on 28 December 2016. It reached number-one on the weekly Oricon Singles Chart with 266,813 copies sold. It also reached the second place on the Billboard Japan Hot 100.

== Track listing ==
Type A
No.	Title	Length
1.	"Boku Igai no Dareka" (僕以外の誰か)	3:52
2.	"Tochū Gesha" (途中下車)	5:24
3.	"Kodoku Guitar" (孤独ギター)	4:31
4.	"Boku Igai no Dareka -off vocal version-" (僕以外の誰か -off vocal version-)	3:52
5.	"Tochū Gesha" (途中下車 -off vocal version-)	5:24
6.	"Kodoku Guitar" (孤独ギター -off vocal version-)	4:31

Type B
No.	Title	Length
1.	"Boku Igai no Dareka" (僕以外の誰か)	3:52
2.	"Tochū Gesha" (途中下車)	5:24
3.	"Koi wa Sainan" (恋は災難)	4:13
4.	"Boku Igai no Dareka -off vocal version-" (僕以外の誰か -off vocal version-)	3:52
5.	"Tochū Gesha -off vocal version-" (途中下車 -off vocal version-)	5:24
6.	"Koi wa Sainan -off vocal version-" (恋は災難 -off vocal version-)	4:13

Type C
No.	Title	Length
1.	"Boku Igai no Dareka" (僕以外の誰か)	3:52
2.	"Tochū Gesha" (途中下車)	5:24
3.	"Let it snow!"	3:45
4.	"Boku Igai no Dareka -off vocal version-" (僕以外の誰か -off vocal version-)	3:52
5.	"Tochū Gesha -off vocal version-" (途中下車 -off vocal version-)	5:24
6.	"Let it snow! -off vocal version-"	3:45

Type D
No.	Title	Length
1.	"Boku Igai no Dareka" (僕以外の誰か)	3:52
2.	"Tochū Gesha" (途中下車)	5:24
3.	"Priority" (プライオリティー)	4:24
4.	"Boku Igai no Dareka -off vocal version-" (僕以外の誰か -off vocal version-)	3:52
5.	"Tochū Gesha -off vocal version-" (途中下車 -off vocal version-)	5:24
6.	"Priority -off vocal version-" (プライオリティー -off vocal version-)	4:24

Theater Edition
No.	Title	Length
1.	"Boku Igai no Dareka" (僕以外の誰か)	3:52
2.	"Tochū Gesha" (途中下車)	5:24
3.	"Taiyō ga Sakamichi o Noboru Koro" (太陽が坂道を昇る頃)	4:26
4.	"Boku Igai no Dareka -off vocal version-" (僕以外の誰か -off vocal version-)	3:52
5.	"Tochū Gesha -off vocal version-" (途中下車 -off vocal version-)	5:24
6.	"Taiyō ga Sakamichi o Noboru Koro -off vocal version-" (太陽が坂道を昇る頃 -off vocal version-)	4:26

== Chart performance ==
=== Oricon ===
Chart	Peak	Debut Sales	Sales Total
Weekly Singles Chart	1	266,813	

=== Billboard Japan ===
Chart	Peak
Japan Hot 100	2
Radio Songs	83
Top Singles Sales	1
