= Boku wa Inai =

- Cover of Type-A edition.

Single by NMB48
- A-side: "Boku wa Inai"
- B-side: "Ima Naraba"; "Sora Kara Ai ga Futte Kuru" (Type-A); "Saigo no Goshaku Dama" (Type-B); "Mōsō Machine 3 Gouki" (Type-C); "Shortcut no Natsu" (Type-D); "Yume no Nagori" (Theater Edition)
- Released: August 3, 2016 (Japan)
- Genre: J-pop
- Label: Laugh out loud! records / Yoshimoto Kogyo
- Songwriters: Yasushi Akimoto (lyrics) aokado (music)
- Producer: Yasushi Akimoto

NMB48 singles chronology
| "Amagami Hime" (2016) | "Boku wa Inai" (2016) | "Boku Igai no Dareka" (2016) |

Music video
- Boku wa Inai(Dance Short ver.)

"Boku wa Inai" (僕はいない; I'm Not Here) is the 15th single by Japanese idol girl group NMB48. It was released on August 3, 2016. It was number-one on the Oricon Weekly Singles Chart with 304,315 copies sold. It was also number-one on the Billboard Japan Hot 100.

The center position in the choreography for the title song is held by Miyuki Watanabe. The music video was shot in Thailand.

== Track listings ==
=== Type-A ===
CD
| No. | Title | Performed by | Length |
|---|---|---|---|
| 1. | "Boku wa Inai" (僕はいない) | | 3:34 |
| 2. | "Ima Naraba" (今ならば) | Saya Milky | 4:01 |
| 3. | "Sora Kara Ai ga Futte Kuru" (空から愛が降って来る) | Team N | 4:35 |
| 4. | "Boku wa Inai (off vocal ver.)" | | 3:33 |
| 5. | "Ima Naraba (off vocal ver.)" | | 4:01 |
| 6. | "Sora Kara Ai ga Futte Kuru (off vocal ver.)" | | 4:37 |

DVD
| No. | Title | Length |
|---|---|---|
| 1. | "Boku wa Inai Music Video" |
| 2. | "Boku wa Inai Music Video Dancing Version" |
| 3. | "Sora Kara Ai ga Futte Kuru Music Video" |
| 4. | "Bonus Footage: NMB48 Live House Tour 2016 Zepp Namba" |

=== Type-B ===
CD
| No. | Title | Performed by | Length |
|---|---|---|---|
| 1. | "Boku wa Inai" (僕はいない) | | 3:34 |
| 2. | "Ima Naraba" (今ならば) | Saya Milky | 4:01 |
| 3. | "Saigo no Goshaku Dama" (最後の五尺玉) | Team M | 4:07 |
| 4. | "Boku wa Inai (off vocal ver.)" | | 3:33 |
| 5. | "Ima Naraba (off vocal ver.)" | | 4:01 |
| 6. | "Saigo no Goshaku Dama (off vocal ver.)" | | 4:09 |

DVD
| No. | Title | Length |
|---|---|---|
| 1. | "Boku wa Inai Music Video" |
| 2. | "Boku wa Inai Music Video Dancing Version" |
| 3. | "Saigo no Goshaku Dama Music Video" |
| 4. | "Bonus Footage: NMB48 Live House Tour 2016 Zepp Namba (March 31 Day Stage)" |

=== Type-C ===
CD
| No. | Title | Performed by | Length |
|---|---|---|---|
| 1. | "Boku wa Inai" (僕はいない) | | 3:34 |
| 2. | "Ima Naraba" (今ならば) | Saya Milky | 4:01 |
| 3. | "Mōsō Machine 3 Gouki" (妄想マシーン3号機) | Team BII | 4:01 |
| 4. | "Boku wa Inai (off vocal ver.)" | | 3:33 |
| 5. | "Ima Naraba (off vocal ver.)" | | 4:01 |
| 6. | "Mōsō Machine 3 Gouki (off vocal ver.)" | | 4:03 |

DVD
| No. | Title | Length |
|---|---|---|
| 1. | "Boku wa Inai Music Video" |
| 2. | "Boku wa Inai Music Video Dancing Version" |
| 3. | "Mōsō Machine 3 Gouki Music Video" |
| 4. | "Bonus Footage: NMB48 Live House Tour 2016 Zepp Namba (March 31 Night Stage)" |

=== Type-D ===
CD
| No. | Title | Performed by | Length |
|---|---|---|---|
| 1. | "Boku wa Inai" (僕はいない) | | 3:34 |
| 2. | "Ima Naraba" (今ならば) | Saya Milky | 4:01 |
| 3. | "Shortcut no Natsu" (ショートカットの夏) | Ririka Sutō | 3:54 |
| 4. | "Boku wa Inai (off vocal ver.)" | | 3:33 |
| 5. | "Ima Naraba (off vocal ver.)" | | 4:01 |
| 6. | "Shortcut no Natsu (off vocal ver.)" | | 3:56 |

DVD
| No. | Title | Length |
|---|---|---|
| 1. | "Boku wa Inai Music Video" |
| 2. | "Boku wa Inai Music Video Dancing Version" |
| 3. | "Ima Naraba Music Video" |
| 4. | "Bonus Footage: NMB48 feat. Yoshimoto Shin Kigeki Vol.15" |
| 5. | "Bonus Footage: Boku wa Inai (Making)" |

=== Theater Edition ===
CD
| No. | Title | Performed by | Length |
|---|---|---|---|
| 1. | "Boku wa Inai" (僕はいない) | | 3:34 |
| 2. | "Ima Naraba" (今ならば) | Saya Milky | 4:01 |
| 3. | "Yume no Nagori" (夢の名残り) | Miyuki Watanabe | 4:28 |
| 4. | "Boku wa Inai (off vocal ver.)" | | 3:33 |
| 5. | "Ima Naraba (off vocal ver.)" | | 4:01 |
| 6. | "Yume no Nagori (off vocal ver.)" | | 4:30 |

== Charts ==
| Chart (2016) | Peak position |
|---|---|
| Japan (Oricon Weekly Singles Chart) | 1 |
| Japan (Billboard Japan Hot 100) | 1 |
