= Amagami Hime =

- Cover of Type-A edition

Single by NMB48
- A-side: "Amagami Hime"
- B-side: "365 Nichi no Kamihikōki"; "Hakanai Monogatari" (Type-A); "Koi o Isoge" (Type-B); "Ferry" (Type-C); "Niji no Tsukurikata" (Type-D); "Dōtonbori yo, Nakasete Kure!" (Theater Edition)
- Released: April 27, 2016 (Japan)
- Genre: J-pop
- Label: laugh out loud! records
- Songwriters: Yasushi Akimoto (lyrics); Satoshi Watanabe (music)
- Producer: Yasushi Akimoto

NMB48 singles chronology
"Must Be Now" (2015)	"Amagami Hime" (2016)	"Boku wa Inai" (2016)

Music video
- Amagami Hime

"Amagami Hime" (甘噛み姫; Play Biting Princess) is the 14th single by Japanese idol girl group NMB48. It was released on April 27, 2016. It was number-one on the Oricon Weekly Singles Chart and ranked 9th with 281,513 copies sold in the first half year of 2016. It was also number-one on the Billboard Japan Hot 100.

The center position in the choreography for the title song is held by Sayaka Yamamoto.

== Track listings ==
=== Type-A ===
CD
No.	Title	Performed by	Length
1.	"Amagami Hime" (甘噛み姫)		4:12
2.	"365 Nichi no Kamihikōki" (365日の紙飛行機)	Sayaka Yamamoto	4:39
3.	"Hakanai Monogatari" (儚い物語)	Team N	4:43
4.	"Amagami Hime (off vocal ver.)"		4:12
5.	"365 Nichi no Kamihikōki (off vocal ver.)"		4:39
6.	"Hakanai Monogatari (off vocal ver.)"		4:42

DVD
No.	Title	Length
1.	"Amagami Hime Music Video"
2.	"Amagami Hime Music Video Dancing Version"
3.	"Hakanai Monogatari Music Video"
4.	"Bonus Footage: NMB48 Aki no Dai Undōkai First Part"

=== Type-B ===
CD
No.	Title	Performed by	Length
1.	"Amagami Hime" (甘噛み姫)		4:12
2.	"365 Nichi no Kamihikōki" (365日の紙飛行機)	Sayaka Yamamoto	4:38
3.	"Koi o Isoge" (恋を急げ)	Team M	3:41
4.	"Amagami Hime (off vocal ver.)"		4:12
5.	"365 Nichi no Kamihikōki (off vocal ver.)"		4:38
6.	"Koi o Isoge (off vocal ver.)"		3:41

DVD
No.	Title	Length
1.	"Amagami Hime Music Video"
2.	"Amagami Hime Music Video Dancing Version"
3.	"Koi o Isoge Music Video"
4.	"Bonus Footage: NMB48 Aki no Dai Undōkai Second Part"

=== Type-C ===
CD
No.	Title	Performed by	Length
1.	"Amagami Hime" (甘噛み姫)		4:12
2.	"365 Nichi no Kamihikōki" (365日の紙飛行機)	Sayaka Yamamoto	4:38
3.	"Ferry" (フェリー)	Team BII	4:38
4.	"Amagami Hime (off vocal ver.)"		4:12
5.	"365 Nichi no Kamihikōki (off vocal ver.)"		4:38
6.	"Ferry (off vocal ver.)"		4:38

DVD
No.	Title	Length
1.	"Amagami Hime Music Video"
2.	"Amagami Hime Music Video Dancing Version"
3.	"Ferry Music Video"
4.	"Bonus Footage: NMB48 Aki no Dai Undōkai Third Part"

=== Type-D ===
CD
No.	Title	Performed by	Length
1.	"Amagami Hime" (甘噛み姫)		4:12
2.	"365 Nichi no Kamihikōki" (365日の紙飛行機)	Sayaka Yamamoto	4:39
3.	"Niji no Tsukurikata" (虹の作り方)	Yūri Ōta, Nagisa Shibuya, Ririka Sutō, Kokoro Naiki, Shū Yabushita	4:18
4.	"Amagami Hime (off vocal ver.)"		4:12
5.	"365 Nichi no Kamihikōki (off vocal ver.)"		4:38
6.	"Niji no Tsukurikata (off vocal ver.)"		4:18

DVD
No.	Title	Length
1.	"Amagami Hime Music Video"
2.	"Amagami Hime Music Video Dancing Version"
3.	"Niji no Tsukurikata Music Video"
4.	"Bonus Footage: NMB48 feat. Yoshimoto Shin Kigeki Vol.14"

=== Theater Edition ===
CD
No.	Title	Performed by	Length
1.	"Amagami Hime" (甘噛み姫)		4:12
2.	"365 Nichi no Kamihikōki" (365日の紙飛行機)	Sayaka Yamamoto	4:38
3.	"Dōtonbori yo, Nakasete Kure!" (道頓堀よ、泣かせてくれ!)		4:47
4.	"Amagami Hime (off vocal ver.)"		4:12
5.	"365 Nichi no Kamihikōki (off vocal ver.)"		4:39
6.	"Dōtonbori yo, Nakasete Kure! (off vocal ver.)"		4:47

== Charts ==
Chart (2016)	Peak position
Japan (Oricon Weekly Singles Chart)	1
Japan (Billboard Japan Hot 100)	1

=== Year-end charts ===
Chart (2016)	Peak position
Japan (Oricon Yearly Singles Chart)	TBA
