= Must Be Now =

"Must be now"
- Cover of Type-A regular edition.

Single by NMB48
- Released: October 7, 2015 (Japan)
- Label: laugh out loud records
- Songwriters: K Carlos, Y Akimoto

NMB48 singles chronology
"Dorian Shōnen" (2015)	"Must be now" (2015)	"Amagami Hime" (2016)

Music video
- Must Be Now (Dance version) on YouTube

"Must be now" is the 13th single by Japanese idol girl group NMB48. It was released on October 7, 2015. It was number-one on the Oricon Weekly Singles Chart with 307,036 copies sold. It was the second best-selling single in Japan in October 2015, with 326,308 copies. It was also the eighteenth best-selling single of 2015 in Japan according to the Oricon Yearly Singles Chart, with 386,320 copies sold. As of February 22, 2016 it had sold 414,015 copies. It was also number-one on the Billboard Japan Hot 100.

An alternative dance shot version with full-size song was published on YouTube.

== Track listing ==
=== Type-A ===
CD
No.	Title	Length
1.	"Must be now"
2.	"片想いよりも思い出を…"
3.	"夢に色がない理由/Team N"
4.	"Must be now (off vocal ver.)"
5.	"片想いよりも思い出を… (off vocal ver.)"
6.	"夢に色がない理由/Team N (off vocal ver.)"

=== Type-B ===
CD
No.	Title	Length
1.	"Must be now"
2.	"片想いよりも思い出を…"
3.	"Good-bye, Guitar/Team M"
4.	"Must be now (off vocal ver.)"
5.	"片想いよりも思い出を… (off vocal ver.)"
6.	"Good-bye, Guitar/Team M (off vocal ver.)"

=== Type-C ===
CD
No.	Title	Length
1.	"Must be now"
2.	"片想いよりも思い出を…"
3.	"空腹で恋愛をするな/Team BII"
4.	"Must be now (off vocal ver.)"
5.	"片想いよりも思い出を… (off vocal ver.)"
6.	"腹で恋愛をするな/Team BII (off vocal ver.)"

== Charts ==
Chart (2015)	Peak position
Japan (Oricon Weekly Singles Chart)	1
Japan (Billboard Japan Hot 100)	1

=== Year-end charts ===
Chart (2015)	Peak position
Japan (Oricon Yearly Singles Chart)	18
