= Dorian Shōnen =

- Cover of Type-A edition.

Single by NMB48
- Released: July 15, 2015 (Japan)
- Label: laugh out loud records

NMB48 singles chronology
| "Don't Look Back!" (2015) | "Dorian Shōnen" (2015) | "Must be now" (2015) |

"Dorian Shōnen" (ドリアン少年; Durian Boy) is the 12th single by Japanese idol girl group NMB48. The main track is centered by Ririka Sutou. It was released on July 15, 2015. It was number-one on the Oricon Weekly Singles Chart with 371,276 copies sold. It was the seventeenth best-selling single of 2015 in Japan according to the Oricon Yearly Singles Chart, with 449,148 copies sold. As of December 7, 2015 it had sold 449,148 copies. It also reached the second place on the Billboard Japan Hot 100.

== Track listing ==
=== Type-A ===
CD
| No. | Title | Length |
|---|---|---|
| 1. | "Dorian Shōnen" |
| 2. | "どうでもいい人仮面" |
| 3. | "命のへそ/Team N" |
| 4. | "Dorian Shōnen (off vocal ver.)" |
| 5. | "どうでもいい人仮面 (off vocal ver.)" |
| 6. | "命のへそ/Team N (off vocal ver.)" |

=== Type-B ===
CD
| No. | Title | Length |
|---|---|---|
| 1. | "Dorian Shōnen" |
| 2. | "どうでもいい人仮面" |
| 3. | "僕だけのSecret time/Team M" |
| 4. | "Dorian Shōnen (off vocal ver.)" |
| 5. | "どうでもいい人仮面 (off vocal ver.)" |
| 6. | "僕だけのSecret time/Team M (off vocal ver.)" |

=== Type-C ===
CD
| No. | Title | Length |
|---|---|---|
| 1. | "Dorian Shōnen" |
| 2. | "どうでもいい人仮面" |
| 3. | "心の文字を書け!/Team BII" |
| 4. | "Dorian Shōnen (off vocal ver.)" |
| 5. | "どうでもいい人仮面 (off vocal ver.)" |
| 6. | "心の文字を書け!/Team BII (off vocal ver.)" |

== Charts ==
| Chart (2015) | Peak position |
|---|---|
| Japan (Oricon Weekly Singles Chart) | 1 |
| Japan (Billboard Japan Hot 100) | 2 |

=== Year-end charts ===
| Chart (2015) | Peak position |
|---|---|
| Japan (Oricon Yearly Singles Chart) | 17 |
