= Saikō Kayo =

- Cover of Type-A edition.

Single by HKT48
- A-side: "Saikō Kayo"
- B-side: Soramimi Rock; Yume Hitotsu (Type A); Yozora no Tsuki o Nomikomou (Type B); Go Bananas! (Type C); Onna no Ko Damon, Hashiranakya! (Theater Edition)
- Released: September 7, 2016
- Genre: J-pop
- Label: Universal Music
- Songwriter: Yasushi Akimoto (lyrics)
- Producer: Yasushi Akimoto

HKT48 singles chronology
"74 Okubun no 1 no Kimi e" (2016)	"Saikō Kayo" (2016)	"Bagutte Iijan" (2017)

Music videos
- "Saikō Kayo" (最高かよ)(Short version) on YouTube
- "Go Bananas!"(Short version) on YouTube
- "夜空の月を飲み込もう"(Short version) on YouTube
- "空耳ロック"(Short version) on YouTube

"Saikō Kayo" (最高かよ) is the 8th single by the Japanese idol girl group HKT48. It was released on September 7, 2016. It was number-one on the Oricon Weekly Singles Chart on its release, selling 269,907 copies. As of September 26, 2016 (chart issue date), it had sold 283,726 copies. It was also number-one on the Billboard Japan Hot 100.

Full version music video, included only in limited editions, was released on YouTube on February 15, 2017 (except in countries which apply the YouTube Red).

== Track listing ==
=== Type-A ===
CD
No.	Title	Length
1.	"Saikō Kayo (最高かよ)"	4:33
2.	"Soramimi Rock (空耳ロック)"	4:58
3.	"Yume Hitotsu (夢ひとつ)"	4:41
4.	"Saikō Kayo (最高かよ)" (Instrumental)	4:32
5.	"Soramimi Rock (空耳ロック)" (Instrumental)	4:58
6.	"Yume Hitotsu (夢ひとつ)" (Instrumental)	4:42

DVD
No.	Title	Length
1.	"Saikō Kayo (最高かよ) Music Video"
2.	"Soramimi Rock (空耳ロック) Music Video"
3.	"Yume Hitotsu (夢ひとつ) Music Video"
4.	"HKT48 no Danketsu Shūgaku Ryokō (HKT48の団結修学旅行) Vol.1"

=== Type-B ===
CD
No.	Title	Length
1.	"Saikō Kayo (最高かよ)"	4:33
2.	"Soramimi Rock (空耳ロック)"	4:58
3.	"Yozora no Tsuki o Nomikomou (夜空の月を飲み込もう)"	3:53
4.	"Saikō Kayo (最高かよ)" (Instrumental)	4:32
5.	"Soramimi Rock (空耳ロック)" (Instrumental)	4:58
6.	"Yozora no Tsuki o Nomikomou (夜空の月を飲み込もう)" (Instrumental)	3:55

DVD
No.	Title	Length
1.	"Saikō Kayo (最高かよ) Music Video"
2.	"Soramimi Rock (空耳ロック) Music Video"
3.	"Yozora no Tsuki o Nomikomou (夜空の月を飲み込もう) Music Video"
4.	"HKT48 no Danketsu Shūgaku Ryokō (HKT48の団結修学旅行) Vol.2"

=== Type-C ===
CD
No.	Title	Length
1.	"Saikō Kayo (最高かよ)"	4:33
2.	"Soramimi Rock (空耳ロック)"	4:58
3.	"Go Bananas!"	4:05
4.	""Saikō Kayo" (最高かよ)" (Instrumental)	4:32
5.	"Soramimi Rock (空耳ロック)" (Instrumental)	4:58
6.	"Go Bananas!" (Instrumental)	4:07

DVD
No.	Title	Length
1.	"Saikō Kayo (最高かよ) Music Video"
2.	"Soramimi Rock (空耳ロック) Music Video"
3.	"Go Bananas! Music Video"
4.	"HKT48 no Danketsu Shūgaku Ryokō (HKT48の団結修学旅行) Vol.3"

=== Theater Edition ===
CD
No.	Title	Length
1.	"Saikō Kayo (最高かよ)"	4:33
2.	"Soramimi Rock (空耳ロック)"	4:58
3.	"Onna no Ko Damon, Hashiranakya! (女の子だもん、走らなきゃ!)"	3:37
4.	""Saikō Kayo" (最高かよ)" (Instrumental)	4:32
5.	"Soramimi Rock (空耳ロック)" (Instrumental)	4:58
6.	"Onna no Ko Damon, Hashiranakya! (女の子だもん、走らなきゃ!)" (Instrumental)	3:39

== Weekly charts ==
Chart (2016)	Peak position
Japan Singles Chart (Oricon)	1
Japan Hot 100 (Billboard)	1
Japan Radio Songs (Billboard)	78
Japan Top Singles Sales (Billboard)	1

== Personnel ==
=== Saikō Kayo ===
16 members were selected for this song. The choreographic center is Hana Matsuoka.

Yuriya Inoue, Aika Ōta, Yui Kōjina, Haruka Kodama, Rino Sashihara, Meru Tashima, Miku Tanaka, Yūka Tanaka, Mio Tomonaga, Mai Fuchigami, Natsumi Matsuoka, Hana Matsuoka, Sakura Miyawaki, Aoi Motomura, Madoka Moriyasu, Nako Yabuki

=== Soramimi Rock ===
Sung by Team TII members.

=== Yume Hitotsu ===
Sung by Chihiro Anai and her companies.

=== Yozora no Tsuki o Nomikomou ===
Sung by Team H members.

=== Go Bananas! ===
Sung by Team KIV members.

=== Onna no Ko Damon, Hashiranakya! ===
Hana Matsuoka's solo song.
