= Chihiro Anai =

Chihiro Anai 穴井 千尋
- Also known as: Chiichan, Chihiron
- Born: 27 January 1996 (age 30)
- Origin: Fukuoka Prefecture, Japan
- Genres: J-pop
- Occupations: Idol, singer
- Instrument: Vocals
- Years active: 2011 – 2016
- Label: AKS
- Formerly of: HKT48

Chihiro Anai (穴井 千尋, Anai Chihiro; born 27 January 1996 in Fukuoka Prefecture) is a former member of the Japanese idol girl group HKT48. She was a member of HKT48's Team H.

== Biography ==
=== Career ===
Anai passed HKT48's 1st generation auditions in July 2011. Her audition song was "Haru ni Nattara" by Miwa. Her stage debut was in November 2011. In March 2012, she was selected to form Team H and was also appointed captain. In the 2014 AKB48 general elections, Anai ranked for the first time, placing 39th with 18,825 votes. On June 8, 2016, during an HKT48 stage greeting, Anai announced she was leaving the group.

=== Character ===
Anai's nickname at the point of debut was "Chiichan", but was later changed to "Chihiron". However, she is still called "Chiichan" by members. She is also often referred to as "Kyappu", which is derived from captain, since she was appointed the captain of Team H when it was formed.

Anai likes pumpkins and tomatoes, but dislikes avocados. She studied classical ballet throughout elementary and middle school. Anai admires Yuko Oshima, and respects Minami Takahashi and Rino Sashihara.

== Discography ==
=== HKT48 singles ===
Year	No.	Title	Role	Notes
2013	1	"Suki! Suki! Skip!"	A-side	Also sang on "Onegai Valentine" and "Ima ga Ichiban"
2013	2	"Melon Juice (HKT48 song)"	A-side	Also sang on "Soko de Nani o Kangaeru ka?" and "Doro no Metronome"
2014	3	"Sakura, Minnade Tabeta"	A-side	Also sang on "Kimi wa Doushite?", "Kidoku Through" and "Kimi no Koto ga Suki Yaken"
2014	4	"Hikaeme I Love You!"	A-side	Also sang on "Idol no Ouja"
2015	5	"12 Byō"	A-side	Also sang on "Rock Da yo, Jinsei wa..." and "Chameleon Joshikōsei"
2015	6	"Shekarashika!"	A-side	Also sang on "Tasogare no Tandem" and "Buddy"
2016	7	"74 Okubun no 1 no Kimi e"	A-side	Also sang on "Chain of Love"

=== AKB48 singles ===
Year	No.	Title	Role	Notes
2012	27	"Gingham Check"	B-side	Sang on "Ano Hi no Fuurin"
2012	29	"Eien Pressure"	B-side	Sang HKT48's first original song, 'Hatsukoi Butterfly'.
2013	34	"Suzukake no Ki no Michi de..."	B-side	Sang 'Wink wa Sankai' with HKT48.
2014	35	"Mae Shika Mukanee"	B-side	Sang on "Himitsu no Diary"
2014	37	"Kokoro no Placard"	B-side	Ranked 39th in 2014 General Election. Sang on "Hito Natsu no Hankouki"
2014	38	"Kibōteki Refrain"	B-side	Sang on "Ambulance"
2015	39	"Green Flash"	B-side	Sang on "Otona Ressha"
2015	41	"Halloween Night"	B-side	Sang on "Mizu no Naka no Dendōritsu"
2016	43	"Kimi wa Melody"	B-side	Sang on "Make Noise"

== Appearances ==
=== Stage Units ===
HKT48 Kenkyuusei Stage "Te wo Tsunaginagara"

1. "Ame no Pianist"

HKT48 Team H 1st Stage "Te wo Tsunaginagara"

1. "Kono Mune no Barcode"

Team H Waiting Stage "Hakata Legend"

1. "Heart Gata Virus"
2. "Enkyori Poster"

HKT48 Himawarigumi 1st Stage "Pajama Drive"

1. "Junjou Shugi"

Team H 2nd Stage "Seishun Girls"

1. "Blue rose"
2. "Fushidara na Natsu"
3. "Cinderella wa Damasarenai"
4. "Kinjirareta Futari"

Team H 3rd Stage "Saishuu Bell ga Naru"

1. "Return Match"
2. "Oshibe to Meshibe to Yoru no Chouchou"

=== Variety ===
- HKT48 no Odekake!
- Hakata Hyakkaten
- Nogizaka46 x HKT48 Crown Program Battle

=== Movies ===
- Himitsu
