= Halloween Night (song) =

- Promotional image

Single by AKB48

from the album 0 to 1 no Aida
- A-side: "Halloween Night"
- B-side: "Sayonara Surfboard" (Types A, B, and the Theater Edition); "Kimi ni Wedding Dress o..." (Type A); "Kimi dake ga Akimeiteita" (Type B); "Kegarete Iru Shinjitsu" (Type C); "Mizu no Naka no Dendōritsu" (Types C and D); "Ippome Ondo" (Type C); "Yankee Machinegun" (Type D); Gunzō (Theater Edition)
- Released: August 26, 2015 (AKB48/JKT48); October 12, 2015 (SNH48)
- Genre: J-pop
- Length: 5:05
- Label: You, Be Cool! / King; Genie Music; Stone Music Entertainment
- Songwriters: Title song: Yasushi Akimoto (lyrics) / Yoshimasa Inoue (music)
- Producer: Yasushi Akimoto

AKB48 singles chronology
"Bokutachi wa Tatakawanai" (2015)	"Halloween Night" (2015)	"Kuchibiru ni Be My Baby" (2015)

Music videos
- Halloween Night (AKB48 Version) on YouTube
- Halloween Night (SNH48 Version) on YouTube

"Halloween Night" (ハロウィン・ナイト, Harowin Naito) is the 41st single by the Japanese idol girl group AKB48. It was released in Japan on August 26, 2015. It was number one on the weekly Oricon Singles Chart, with 1,277,761 copies also becoming the best-selling single in Japan in August. It was also number one on the Billboard Japan Hot 100. A JKT48 version of this song was released on the same day, while a SNH48 version was released in October 12.

== Background ==
The member lineup for the title track and several supporting B-sides was determined by the results from the annual election held by AKB48 and its several sister groups (in 2015 it was called "AKB48 41st Single Senbatsu General Election"). Rino Sashihara, having won the election, serves as the center (choreography center) in the title song.

== Musical style ==
The title track is done in a dark disco style, as opposed to the brightness of "Koi Suru Fortune Cookie" (the girl group's election single from two years ago). JKT48, the Jakarta-based sister group to AKB, released a dangdut version of the song.

The full version music video (included only in limited editions) was released on YouTube in December 9, along with the 42nd single "Kuchibiru ni Be My Baby".

== Release ==
The single was released in several versions: Type A (two editions: limited and regular), Type B (limited and regular), Type C (limited and regular), Type D (limited and regular), and a version called the "Theater Edition". All versions, except the Theater Edition, include a DVD with several music videos.

The title song was for the first time performed in public on July 4, 2015, on the NTV TV show The Music Day: Ongaku wa Taiyō Da (THE MUSIC DAY 音楽は太陽だ。) (an 11-hour long music special).

On AKB48 Fes 2016 this song is played as main set closer, with live band accompaniment.

The song "Ippome Ondo" in Type C is a traditional music of Bon festival.

== Music video ==
The music video for the title track was directed by Kazuaki Seki, who had previously directed music videos for a number of other Japanese artists.

== Track listings ==
All lyrics were written by Yasushi Akimoto.

=== Type A ===
CD
No.	Title	Music	{{{extra_column}}}	Length
1.	"Halloween Night" (ハロウィン・ナイト)	Yoshimasa Inoue	Yoshimasa Inoue
2.	"Sayonara Surfboard" (さよならサーフボード) (performed by Under Girls)	Yoshimasa Inoue	Yoshimasa Inoue
3.	"Kimi ni Wedding Dress o..." (君にウェディングドレスを…) (performed by Future Girls)	福田貴訓	野中“まさ”雄一
4.	"Halloween Night" (off-vocal ver.)
5.	"Sayonara Surfboard" (off-vocal ver.)
6.	"Kimi ni Wedding Dress o..." (off-vocal ver.)

DVD
No.	Title	Director	Length
1.	"Halloween Night" (music video)	Kazuaki Seki
2.	"Sayonara Surfboard" (music video)
3.	"Kimi ni Wedding Dress o..." (music video)

=== Type B ===
CD
No.	Title	Music	{{{extra_column}}}	Length
1.	"Halloween Night"
2.	"Sayonara Surfboard" (performed by Under Girls)
3.	"Kimi dake ga Akimeiteita" (君だけが秋めいていた) (performed by Upcoming Girls)	奥田もとい	Main Kushita (a.k.a. Kushita Mine)
4.	"Halloween Night" (off-vocal ver.)
5.	"Sayonara Surfboard" (off-vocal ver.)
6.	"Kimi dake ga Akimeiteita" (off-vocal ver.)

DVD
No.	Title	{{{extra_column}}}	Length
1.	"Halloween Night" (music video)	Kazuaki Seki
2.	"Sayonara Surfboard" (music video)
3.	"Kimi dake ga Akimeiteita" (music video)

=== Type C ===
CD
No.	Title	Music	{{{extra_column}}}	Length
1.	"Halloween Night"
2.	"Mizu no Naka no Dendōritsu" (水の中の伝導率) (performed by Next Girls))	田中俊亮	佐々木裕
3.	"Ippome Ondo" (一歩目音頭)	福田貴史	福田貴史, 福田大輔
4.	"Halloween Night" (off-vocal ver.)
5.	"Mizu no Naka no Dendōritsu" (off-vocal ver.)
6.	"Ippome Ondo" (off-vocal ver.)

DVD
No.	Title	{{{extra_column}}}	Length
1.	"Halloween Night" (music video)	Kazuaki Seki
2.	"Mizu no Naka no Dendōritsu" (music video)
3.	"Ippome Ondo" (music video)

=== Type D ===
CD
No.	Title	Length
1.	"Halloween Night"	5:07
2.	"Mizu no Naka no Dendōritsu" (performed by Next Girls)	4:33
3.	"Yankee Machinegun" (ヤンキーマシンガン)	4:01
4.	"Halloween Night" (off-vocal ver.)	5:07
5.	"Mizu no Naka no Dendōritsu" (off-vocal ver.)	4:33
6.	"Yankee Machinegun" (off-vocal ver.)	3:58

DVD
No.	Title	{{{extra_column}}}	Length
1.	"Halloween Night" (music video)	Kazuaki Seki	5:07
2.	"Mizu no Naka no Dendōritsu" (music video)		4:33
3.	"Yankee Machinegun" (music video)		4:01

=== Theater Edition ===
CD
No.	Title	Length
1.	"Halloween Night"
2.	"Sayonara Surfboard" (performed by Under Girls)
3.	"Gunzō" (群像)
4.	"Halloween Night" (off-vocal ver.)
5.	"Sayonara Surfboard" (off-vocal ver.)
6.	"Gunzō" (off-vocal ver.)

== Personnel ==
=== "Halloween Night" ===
The senbatsu (member selection/lineup) for the song consists of 16 members. The center is Rino Sashihara.

- AKB48 Team A: Haruka Shimazaki, Minami Takahashi, Yui Yokoyama
- AKB48 Team K: Tomu Muto, Jurina Matsui, Sayaka Yamamoto, Sae Miyazawa, Rie Kitahara
- AKB48 Team B: Yuki Kashiwagi, Mayu Watanabe, Miyuki Watanabe
- SKE48 Team KII: Akane Takayanagi, Kaori Matsumura
- SKE48 Team E: Aya Shibata
- HKT48 Team H: Rino Sashihara
- HKT48 Team KIV: Sakura Miyawaki

=== "Sayonara Surfboard" ===
The undergirls selection consists of 16 members. The center is Haruka Kodama.

- AKB48 Team K: Aki Takajo, Minami Minegishi
- AKB48 Team B: Rena Kato, Yuria Kizaki
- AKB48 Team 4: Nana Okada, Mako Kojima, Juri Takahashi
- SKE48 Team S: Masana Oya
- SKE48 Team KII: Mina Oba, Nao Furuhata
- SKE48 Team E: Akari Suda, Marika Tani
- HKT48 Team H: Haruka Kodama, Meru Tashima
- HKT48 Team KIV: Mio Tomonaga, Mai Fuchigami

=== "Mizu no Naka no Dendōritsu" ===
The Next Girls selection consists of 16 members. The center is Chihiro Anai.

- AKB48 Team K: Yūka Tano, Mion Mukaichi
- AKB48 Team B: Natsuki Uchiyama
- SKE48 Team S: Haruka Futamura, Ami Miyamae
- SKE48 Team E: Kanon Kimoto
- NMB48 Team N: Kei Jonishi
- NMB48 Team M: Miru Shiroma, Reina Fujie, Fuuko Yagura
- HKT48 Team H: Chihiro Anai, Yui Kojina, Rino Sakaguchi
- HKT48 Team KIV: Aika Ota, Kanna Okada, Madoka Moriyasu

=== "Kimi ni Wedding Dress o..." ===
The Future Girls selection consists of 16 members. The center is Sumire Satō.

- AKB48 Team A: Yukari Sasaki
- AKB48 Team K: Shinobu Mogi
- SKE48 Team S: Rion Azuma, Risako Goto, Suzuran Yamauchi
- SKE48 Team KII: Sarina Souda
- SKE48 Team E: Kyoka Isohara, Rumi Kato, Sumire Satō
- NMB48 Team N: Ayaka Umeda, Nagisa Shibuya, Shu Yabushita
- HKT48 Team H: Natsumi Matsuoka

=== "Kimi Dake ga Akimeiteita" ===
The Upcoming Girls selection consists of 16 members. The center is Makiko Saito.

- AKB48 Team A: Nana Owada
- AKB48 Team K: Haruka Ishida, Ayana Shinozaki, Mariya Nagao
- AKB48 Team 4: Miyuu Omori
- SKE48 Team S: Ryoha Kitagawa, Mai Takeuchi
- SKE48 Team KII: Anna Ishida
- SKE48 Team E: Madoka Umemoto, Natsuki Kamata, Haruka Kumazaki, Makiko Saito
- NMB48 Team M: Airi Tanigawa
- NMB48 Team BII: Miori Ichikawa
- HKT48 Team KIV: Nao Ueki, Aoi Motomura

=== "Ippome Ondo" ===
Consists of 16 members. The center is Mayu Watanabe.

- AKB48 Team A: Nana Owada, Haruna Kojima, Haruka Shimazaki, Minami Takahashi, Yui Yokoyama
- AKB48 Team K: Mion Mukaichi
- AKB48 Team B: Ryoka Oshima, Natsuki Uchiyama, Rena Kato, Yuria Kizaki
- AKB48 Team 4: Mako Kojima, Juri Takahashi
- SKE48 Team S: Jurina Matsui
- NMB48 Team N: Sayaka Yamamoto
- NMB48 Team BII: Miyuki Watanabe
- HKT48 Team H: Haruka Kodama
- HKT48 Team KIV: Sakura Miyawaki

=== "Yankee Machine Gun" ===
The opening theme of Majisuka Gakuen 5, consists of 18 members. The centers are Haruka Shimazaki and Sakura Miyawaki.

- AKB48 Team A: Nana Owada, Anna Iriyama, Haruka Shimazaki, Minami Takahashi, Yui Yokoyama
- AKB48 Team K: Mion Mukaichi
- AKB48 Team B: Ryoka Oshima, Natsuki Uchiyama, Rena Kato, Yuria Kizaki
- AKB48 Team 4: Mako Kojima, Juri Takahashi
- SKE48 Team S: Jurina Matsui
- NMB48 Team N: Sayaka Yamamoto
- NMB48 Team BII: Miyuki Watanabe
- HKT48 Team H: Haruka Kodama
- HKT48 Team KIV: Sakura Miyawaki
- AKB48 Graduates: Rina Kawaei

=== "Gunzō" ===
The ending theme of Majisuka Gakuen 5, consists of 7 members.

- AKB48 Team A: Haruka Shimazaki, Minami Takahashi, Yui Yokoyama
- SKE48 Team S: Jurina Matsui
- NMB48 Team N: Sayaka Yamamoto
- HKT48 Team H: Haruka Kodama
- HKT48 Team KIV: Sakura Miyawaki

== Release history ==
Region	Date	Format	Label
Japan	August 26, 2015 September 16, 2015 (LP)	CD; digital download; streaming; LP	King Records (YOU BE COOL division)
Hong Kong, Taiwan	August 26, 2015	CD; digital download; streaming	King Records
South Korea	November 13, 2018	digital download; streaming	Stone Music Entertainment; Genie Music; King
