= Kuchibiru ni Be My Baby =

- Type A cover

Single by AKB48

from the album Thumbnail
- A-side: "Kuchibiru ni Be My Baby"
- Released: December 9, 2015
- Recorded: 2015
- Genre: J-pop
- Length: 4:38 (Title track)
- Label: You, Be Cool! / King; Genie Music; Stone Music Entertainment
- Songwriter(s): Title song: Yasushi Akimoto (lyrics) / Yoshifumi Kōchi (music)
- Producer(s): Yasushi Akimoto

AKB48 singles chronology
"Halloween Night" (2015)	"Kuchibiru ni Be My Baby" (2015)	"Kimi wa Melody" (2016)

Music video
- Kuchibiru ni Be My Baby Full Version

"Kuchibiru ni Be My Baby" (唇にBe My Baby; On-the-Lips Be My Baby) is the 42nd single by the Japanese idol girl group AKB48. It was released in Japan on December 9, 2015. As of February 22, 2016 (issue date), it has sold 1,041,763 copies. It was number-one on the weekly Oricon Singles Chart and was also number-one on the Billboard Japan Hot 100.

== Background ==
The title track of this single marks Minami Takahashi's first time to hold an unshared choreography center position since 2006's "Sakura no Hanabiratachi". The B-side track "365 Nichi no Kamihikōki" is a gentle, medium-tempo song. It won Excellent Work Award in the 58th Japan Record Awards, Best Theme Song in 88th The Television Drama Academy Award and 11th Taisho Ryou Music Award.

== Release ==
The single will be released in nine versions: Type A (two editions: limited and regular), Type B (limited and regular), Type C (limited and regular), Type D (limited and regular), and a version called a "Theater Edition". All versions, except the Theater Edition, include a DVD with four music videos (there's a music video for every song included in the particular version) and a video related to Minami Takahashi.

For the first time since "Chance no Junban", AKB48 did not sell a million copies of a single within the first week after the release, breaking the so-called Million Streak that had started since "Everyday, Kachuusha". Kuchibiru ni Be My Baby still managed to sell a million copies after several weeks. "Kuchibiru ni Be My Baby" sold 905.490 copies in 2015, making it the 4th best selling single of the year, according to the Oricon.

== Music video ==
The music video for the title track was directed by Eiki Takahashi, who had already directed several music videos for the group. The full version (included only in limited editions) lasts for 13 minutes and was published along with the release of Kimi wa Melody (43rd single). On March 8, 2016, A Full version was released on official AKB48 YouTube channel.

== Track listings ==
All lyrics were written by Yasushi Akimoto.

The first two tracks are the same for all versions.

=== Type A ===
CD
No.	Title	Music	Arrangement	Length
1.	"Kuchibiru ni Be My Baby" (唇にBe My Baby)	Yoshifumi Kōchi	Hiroshi Sasaki	4:38
2.	"365 Nichi no Kamihikōki" (365日の紙飛行機)	Toshikazu Kadono, Hiroki Aoba	Teppei Shimizu	4:42
3.	"Kimi o Kimi o Kimi o..." (君を君を君を…) (performed by 次世代選抜)
4.	"Yasashii Place" (やさしい Place) (performed by Team A)			4:28
5.	"Kuchibiru ni Be My Baby off-vocal ver."			4:38
6.	"365 Nichi no Kamihikōki off-vocal ver."			4:42
7.	"Kimi o Kimi o Kimi o... off-vocal ver."
8.	"Yasashii Place off-vocal ver."			4:28

DVD
No.	Title	Director	Length
1.	"Kuchibiru ni Be My Baby" (music video)	Eiki Takahashi	13:08
2.	"365 Nichi no Kamihikōki" (music video)		5:06
3.	"Kimi o Kimi o Kimi o..." (music video)
4.	"Yasashii Place" (music video)
5.	"Words: Minami Takahashi Speaks Words of Wisdom" (WORDS ～minami takahashi speaks words of wisdom～)

=== Type B ===
CD
No.	Title	Length
3.	"Madonna no Sentaku" (マドンナの選択) (performed by れなっち総選挙選抜)
4.	"Onēsan no Hitorigoto" (お姉さんの独り言) (performed by Team K)
7.	"Madonna no Sentaku off-vocal ver."
8.	"Onēsan no Hitorigoto off-vocal ver."

DVD
No.	Title	Length
3.	"Madonna no Sentaku" (music video)
4.	"Onēsan no Hitorigoto" (music video)
5.	"Party no Sono Saki e: Takahashi Minami Sotsugyō Chokuzen Interview" (PARTYのその先へ ～高橋みなみ 卒業直前インタビュー～)

=== Type C ===
CD
No.	Title	Length
3.	"Amanojaku Batta" (あまのじゃくバッタ) (performed by Team 8)
4.	"Kin no Hane o Motsu Hito yo" (金の羽根を持つ人よ) (performed by Team B)
7.	"Amanojaku Batta off-vocal ver."
8.	"Kin no Hane o Motsu Hito yo off-vocal ver."

DVD
No.	Title	Length
3.	"Amanojaku Batta" (music video)
4.	"Kin no Hane o Motsu Hito yo" (music video)
5.	"Teramina: 812 Terabyte kara Gensen-shita Takahashi Minami Kessaku-shū" (テラみな ～812テラバイトから厳選した高橋みなみ傑作集～)

=== Type D ===
CD
No.	Title	Length
3.	"Senaka Kotoba" (背中言葉)	4:53
4.	"Nanka, Chotto, Kyū ni" (なんか、ちょっと、急に…) (performed by Team 4)	4:44
7.	"Senaka Kotoba off-vocal ver."	4:53
8.	"Nanka, Chotto, Kyū ni off-vocal ver."	4:44
Total length:		39:58

DVD
No.	Title	Length
3.	"Senaka Kotoba" (music video)	6:45
4.	"Nanka, Chotto, Kyū ni yo" (music video)
5.	"Tabidatsu Kimi e: Takahashi Minami e no AKB48 Group Member Oiwai Comment-shū" (旅立つ君へ。 ～高橋みなみへのAKB48グループメンバーお祝いコメント集～)

=== Theater Edition ===
CD
No.	Title	Music	{{{extra_column}}}	Length
1.	"Kuchibiru ni Be My Baby" (唇にBe My Baby)	Yoshifumi Kōchi	Hiroshi Sasaki
2.	"365 Nichi no Kamihikōki" (365日の紙飛行機)	Toshikazu Kadono, Hiroki Aoba	Teppei Shimizu
3.	"Sakki made wa Ice Tea" (さっきまではアイスティー) (performed by 虫かご)
4.	"Kuchibiru ni Be My Baby off-vocal ver."
5.	"365 Nichi no Kamihikōki off-vocal ver."
6.	"Sakki made wa Ice Tea off-vocal ver."

== Personnel ==
=== "Kuchibiru ni Be My Baby" ===
The senbatsu (member selection/lineup) for the song consists of 16 members. The center (choreography center) is Minami Takahashi.

- AKB48 Team A: Anna Iriyama, Haruna Kojima, Haruka Shimazaki, Minami Takahashi, Yui Yokoyama
- AKB48 Team K: Minami Minegishi
- AKB48 Team B: Yuki Kashiwagi, Rena Kato, Yuria Kizaki, Mayu Watanabe
- SKE48 Team S: Jurina Matsui
- NMB48 Team N: Sayaka Yamamoto
- HKT48 Team H: Rino Sashihara
- HKT48 Team KIV: Sakura Miyawaki
- NGT48: Rie Kitahara
- SNH48 Team SII: Sae Miyazawa

=== "365 Nichi no Kamihikōki" ===
The "Asa ga Kita senbatsu" (member selection/lineup) for the song consists of 16 members. The "center" is Sayaka Yamamoto.

- AKB48 Team A: Anna Iriyama, Haruna Kojima, Haruka Shimazaki, Minami Takahashi, Yui Yokoyama
- AKB48 Team B: Yuki Kashiwagi, Rena Kato, Yuria Kizaki, Mayu Watanabe
- SKE48 Team S: Jurina Matsui
- NMB48 Team N: Sayaka Yamamoto
- NMB48 Team BII: Miyuki Watanabe
- HKT48 Team H: Haruka Kodama, Rino Sashihara
- HKT48 Team KIV: Sakura Miyawaki
- NGT48: Rie Kitahara

=== "Kimi o Kimi o Kimi o" ===
The "Next Generation Senbatsu" (member selection/lineup) for the song consists of 16 members. The "center" is Haruka Kodama.

- Team A: Nana Owada, Megu Taniguchi
- Team K: Yuka Tano, Mion Mukaichi, Tomu Muto
- Team B: Ryoka Oshima
- Team 4: Nana Okada, Saya Kawamoto, Mako Kojima, Haruka Komiyama, Juri Takahashi, Miki Nishino, Yuiri Murayama
- Team 8: Nagisa Sakaguchi
- Team BII: Miyuki Watanabe
- Team H: Haruka Kodama

=== "Madonna no Sentaku" ===
The "Renacchi Sōsenkyo Senbatsu" (member selection/lineup) for the song consists of 16 members. The "center" is Natsumi Tanaka.

- Team A: Anna Iriyama, Shimazaki Haruka, Ami Maeda
- Team K: Yuka Tano, Mion Mukaichi, Shinobu Mogi
- Team B: Ryoka Oshima, Kato Rena
- Team 8: Nanami Sato
- Team E: Sato Sumire
- Team N: Yamamoto Sayaka
- Team M: Miru Shiroma
- Team H: Yui Kojina, Natsumi Tanaka, Natsumi Matsuoka
- Team KIV: Murashige Anna

=== "Ama Nojaku Batta" ===
Team 8's song. The "center" is Ikumi Nakano.

- Team 8: Mei Abe, Moeka Iwasaki, Rin Okabe, Yui Oguri, Nao Ota, Erina Oda, Momoka Onishi, Reina Kita, Yurina Gyoten, Narumi Kuranoo, Moeri Kondo, Nagisa Sakaguchi, Akari Sato, Shiori Sato, Nanami Sato, Miu Shitao, Maria Shimizu, Karin Shimoaoki, Kaoru Takaoka, Ayane Takahashi, Yuri Tani, Hijiri Tanikawa, Kurena Cho, Ikumi Nakano, Serika Nagano, Haruna Hashimoto, Yuna Hattori, Sayuna Hama, Riona Hamamatsu, Tsumugi Hayasaka, Kotone Hitomi, Ayaka Hidaritomo, Natsuki Hirose, Rena Fukuchi, Natsuki Fujimura, Hitomi Honda, Rira Miyazato, Kasumi Mogi, Karen Yoshida, Moka Yaguchi, Nanami Yamada, Ai Yamamoto, Ruka Yamamoto, Yuri Yokomichi, Yui Yokoyama, Nanase Yoshikawa, Miyu Yoshino

=== "Senaka Kotoba" ===
Minami Takahashi's graduation song.

- AKB48 Team A: Anna Iriyama, Haruna Kojima, Haruka Shimazaki, Minami Takahashi, Yui Yokoyama, Nana Owada
- AKB48 Team K: Minami Minegishi, Mion Mukaichi
- AKB48 Team B: Yuki Kashiwagi, Rena Kato, Yuria Kizaki, Mayu Watanabe
- AKB48 Team 4: Haruka Komiyama, Juri Takahashi
- SKE48 Team S: Jurina Matsui
- NMB48 Team N: Sayaka Yamamoto
- HKT48 Team H: Rino Sashihara
- HKT48 Team KIV: Sakura Miyawaki
- NGT48: Rie Kitahara
- SNH48 Team SII: Sae Miyazawa

=== "Yasashii Place" ===
Team A's song. The "center" is Haruka Shimazaki & Sakura Miyawaki.

- Team A: Anna Iriyama, Karen Iwata, Shizuka Oya, Nana Owada, Mayu Ogasawara, Natsuki Kojima, Haruna Kojima, Yukari Sasaki, Haruka Shimazaki, Miru Shiroma, Minami Takahashi, Kayoko Takita, Megu Taniguchi, Chiyori Nakanishi, Mariko Nakamura, Rena Nishiyama, Rina Hirata, Ami Maeda, Miho Miyazaki, Sakura Miyawaki, Nanami Yamada, Yui Yokoyama

=== "Onēsan no Hitorigoto" ===
Team K's song. The "center" is Mion Mukaichi.

- Team K: Moe Aigasa, Maria Abe, Haruka Ishida, Manami Ichikawa, Haruka Kodama, Ayana Shinozaki, Haruka Shimada, Hinana Shimoguchi, Mariya Suzuki, Aki Takajo, Yuka Tano, Chisato Nakata, Ikumi Nakano, Mariya Nagao, Nana Fujita, Jurina Matsui, Minami Minegishi, Mion Mukaichi, Tomu Muto, Shinobu Mogi, Ami Yumoto, Sayaka Yamamoto

=== "Kin no Hane o Motsu Hito yo" ===
Team B's song. The "center" is Rena Kato & Yuria Kizaki.

- Team B: Misaki Iwasa, Natsuki Uchiyama, Ayano Umeta, Ryoka Oshima, Yuki Kashiwagi, Rena Kato, Yuria Kizaki, Kana Kobayashi, Moe Goto, Nagisa Sakaguchi, Miyu Takeuchi, Makiho Tatsuya, Miku Tanabe, Seina Fukuoka, Nako Yabuki, Aeri Yokoshima, Mayu Watanabe, Miyuki Watanabe

=== "Nanka, Chotto, Kyū ni" ===
Team 4's song.

- Team 4: Miyabi Iino, Rina Izuta, Saho Iwatate, Rio Okawa, Miyuu Omori, Ayaka Okada, Nana Okada, Saya Kawamoto, Ryoha Kitagawa, Saki Kitazawa, Mako Kojima, Haruka Komiyama, Kiara Sato, Nagisa Shibuya, Juri Takahashi, Mio Tomonaga, Miki Nishino, Rena Nozawa, Yuiri Murayama

=== "Sakki Made wa Ice Tea" ===
The "Mushi Kago" (member selection/lineup) for the song consists of 12 members. The "center" is Haruka Komiyama & Shu Yabushita.

- Team B: Moe Goto, Seina Fukuoka
- Team 4: Haruka Komiyama
- Team 8: Nagisa Sakaguchi
- SKE48 Kenkyūsei: Obata Yuna, Goto Rara
- Team M: Uemura Azusa
- Team BII: Shu Yabushita
- HKT48 Kenkyūsei: Aramaki Misaki, Maria Imamura
- NGT48 Kenkyūsei: Oguma Tsugumi, Moeka Takakura

== Other versions ==
- The Thai idol group BNK48, a sister group of AKB48, covered the song "365 Nichi no Kamihikōki" and named it "Sam Roi Hoksip Ha Wan Kap Khrueangbin Kradat" (Thai: สามร้อยหกสิบห้าวันกับเครื่องบินกระดาษ; IPA: [sǎ:m rɔ́:j hòk.sìp hâ: wan kàp krɯ̂aŋ.bin krà.dà:t]; "365 Days with Paper Airplanes"). First performed on June 2, 2017, at the group's debut event in Bangkok, the song was included on the group's debut single, "Aitakatta – Yak Cha Dai Phop Thoe", officially released on August 8, 2017.
- MNL48, AKB48's sister group in the Philippines, made a Filipino version of the song "365 Nichi no Kamihikōki" titled "365 Araw ng Eroplanong Papel" ("365 Days of Paper Airplane"). This was the idol group's third single, released on April 11, 2019.
- Indonesian idol group JKT48, a sister group of AKB48, covered the song "365 Nichi no Kamihikōki" in Indonesian called "Pesawat Kertas 365 Hari" ("365 Days of Paper Airlane"). The song was included on the group's album Mahagita.

== Release history ==
Region	Date	Format	Label
Japan	December 9, 2015	CD; digital download; streaming	King Records (YOU BE COOL division)
Hong Kong, Taiwan	December 9, 2015	CD; digital download; streaming	King Records
South Korea	November 2, 2018	digital download; streaming	Stone Music Entertainment; Genie Music; King
