= Sakura, Minnade Tabeta =

- Type A cover

Single by HKT48
- Released: March 12, 2014
- Recorded: 2014
- Genre: J-pop

HKT48 singles chronology
"Melon Juice" (2013)	"Sakura, Minnade Tabeta" (2014)	"Hikaeme I Love You!" (2014)

"Sakura, Minnade Tabeta" (桜、みんなで食べた), literally "Cherry Blossoms, Let's eat together", is the third single by the Japanese idol group HKT48, released on March 12, 2014. It reached number one on the Oricon and Billboard Japan weekly singles chart. It was the 19th best-selling single of the year in Japan, with 327,815 copies.

== Promotion and release ==
"Sakura, Minnade Tabeta" was released in Japan on March 12, 2014 in four different versions: Type A, Type B, Type C and the Theater.

The centers for the title track were announced to be Meru Tashima and Mio Tomonaga, both same as the previous single "Melon Juice". The title track would also feature a new member whose promotion have been announced in January: Miku Tanaka, and Nako Yabuki, who was featured as the center in "Wink wa 3kai", an HKT48 song recorded on AKB48's CD, as well as Chiyori Nakanishi, who was one of Senbatsu members in the 1st single but not chosen for the 2nd.

The B-side songs recorded on Type A and B versions are sung by Team H members and KIV members, both members were based on the announcement made at the HKT48's concert in Oita on January 11, 2014.

== Track listing ==
=== Type-A ===
CD
No.	Title	Length
1.	"Sakura, Minnade Tabeta" (桜、みんなで食べた)
2.	"Kimiwa Doushite?" (君はどうして?)
3.	"Kidoku Through (Team H)" (既読スルー (Team H))
4.	"Sakura, Minnade Tabeta[Instrumental]"
5.	"Kimiwa Doushite? [Instrumental]"
6.	"Kidoku Through (Team H) [Instrumental]"

DVD
No.	Title	Length
1.	"Sakura, Minnade Tabeta Music Video"
2.	"Kidoku Through Music Video"
3.	"Special Footage "HKT48 Melon Juice release commemoration Big Bowling Event - First Part"" (特典映像「HKT48 メロンジュース発売記念 大ボウリング大会 前編」)

=== Type-B ===
CD
No.	Title	Length
1.	"Sakura, Minnade Tabeta" (桜、みんなで食べた)
2.	"Kimiwa Doushite?" (君はどうして?)
3.	"Mukashino Kareshino Onīchanto Tsukiauto Iukoto (Team KIV)" (昔の彼氏のお兄ちゃんとつき合うということ (Team KIV))
4.	"Sakura, Minnade Tabeta[Instrumental]"
5.	"Kimiwa Doushite? [Instrumental]"
6.	"Mukashino Kareshino Onīchanto Tsukiauto Iukoto (Team KIV) [Instrumental]"

DVD
No.	Title	Length
1.	"Sakura, Minnade Tabeta Music Video"
2.	"Mukashino Kareshino Onīchanto Tsukiauto Iukoto Music Video"
3.	"Special Footage "HKT48 Melon Juice release commemoration Big Bowling Event - Second Part"" (特典映像「HKT48 メロンジュース発売記念 大ボウリング大会 後編」)

=== Type-C ===
CD
No.	Title	Length
1.	"Sakura, Minnade Tabeta" (桜、みんなで食べた)
2.	"Kimiwa Doushite?" (君はどうして?)
3.	"Oboete Kudasai (Trainees)" (覚えてください (研究生))
4.	"Sakura, Minnade Tabeta[Instrumental]"
5.	"Kimiwa Doushite? [Instrumental]"
6.	"Oboete Kudasai (Trainees) [Instrumental]"

DVD
No.	Title	Length
1.	"Sakura, Minnade Tabeta Music Video"
2.	"Sakura, Minnade Tabeta Making Video"
3.	"Special Footage "First Nationwide Shake-hands Event for HKT48 3rd-generation and Draft members"" (特典映像「HKT48 3期生&ドラフト生 はじめての全国握手会」)

=== Theater Edition ===
CD
No.	Title	Length
1.	"Sakura, Minnade Tabeta" (桜、みんなで食べた)
2.	"Kimiwa Doushite?" (君はどうして?)
3.	"Kimino Kotoga Sukiyaken" (君のことが好きやけん)
4.	"Sakura, Minnade Tabeta[Instrumental]"
5.	"Kimiwa Doushite? [Instrumental]"
6.	"Kimino Kotoga Sukiyaken [Instrumental]"

== Personnel ==
=== "Sakura, Minnade Tabeta" ===
The centers for the title track are Meru Tashima and Mio Tomonaga.

- Team H : Yuka Akiyoshi, Chihiro Anai, Haruka Kodama, Natsumi Matsuoka, Chiyori Nakanishi, Rino Sashihara, Meru Tashima
- Team KIV : Mai Fuchigami, Sakura Miyawaki, Madoka Moriyasu, Aoi Motomura, Anna Murashige, Aika Ota, Mio Tomonaga
- Kenkyuusei : Miku Tanaka, Nako Yabuki

=== "Kimiwa Doushite?" ===
- Team H : Yuka Akiyoshi, Chihiro Anai, Haruka Kodama, Natsumi Matsuoka, Chiyori Nakanishi, Rino Sashihara, Meru Tashima
- Team KIV : Mai Fuchigami, Sakura Miyawaki, Madoka Moriyasu, Aoi Motomura, Anna Murashige, Aika Ota, Mio Tomonaga
- Kenkyuusei : Miku Tanaka, Nako Yabuki

=== "Kidoku Through" ===
Center : Meru Tashima

- Team H: Yuka Akiyoshi, Chihiro Anai, Yuriya Inoue, Haruka Kodama, Yui Kōjina, Hiroka Kodama, Natsumi Matsuoka, Chiyori Nakanishi, Naoko Okamoto, Riko Sakaguchi, Rino Sashihara, Natsumi Tanaka, Meru Tashima, Izumi Umemoto, Haruka Wakatabe, Marina Yamada

=== "Mukashino Kareshino Onīchanto Tsukiauto Iukoto" ===
Center : Mio Tomonaga

- Team KIV : Mai Fuchigami, Izumi Gotō, Mina Imada, Serina Kumazawa, Sakura Miyawaki, Madoka Moriyasu, Aoi Motomura, Anna Murashige, Kanna Okada, Aika Ota, Yuki Shimono, Yūka Tanaka, Marika Tani, Asuka Tomiyoshi, Mio Tomonaga, Nao Ueki

=== "Oboete Kudasai" ===
- Trainees: Maiko Fukagawa, Shino Iwahana, Manami Kusaba, Haruka Ueno, Mashiro Ui
- 3rd-generation trainees: Misaki Aramaki, Hazuki Hokazono, Sae Kurihara, Erena Sakamoto, Miku Tanaka, Riko Tsutsui, Nako Yabuki, Emiri Yamashita, Yuuna Yamauchi

=== "Kimino Kotoga Sukiyaken ===
- Team H : Yuka Akiyoshi, Chihiro Anai, Haruka Kodama, Natsumi Matsuoka, Chiyori Nakanishi, Rino Sashihara, Meru Tashima
- Team KIV : Mai Fuchigami, Sakura Miyawaki, Madoka Moriyasu, Aoi Motomura, Anna Murashige, Aika Ota, Mio Tomonaga
- Kenkyuusei : Miku Tanaka, Nako Yabuki

== Oricon Charts ==
Release	Oricon Singles Chart	Peak position	Debut sales (copies)	Sales total (copies)
March 12, 2014	Daily Chart	1	227,322	
March 12, 2014	Weekly Chart	1	272,818	
March 12, 2014	Monthly Chart	4	276,799	
