= Shekarashika! =

Single by HKT48 feat. Kishidan
- A-side: "Shekarashika!"
- B-side: "Tasogare no Tandem"; "Buddy" (Type A); "Yumemiru Team KIV" (Type B); "Ijiwaru Chū" (Type C); "Koi no Yubisaki" (Theater Ed.)
- Released: November 25, 2015 (Japan)
- Genre: J-pop
- Label: Universal Sigma
- Songwriter: Yasushi Akimoto (lyrics)
- Producer: Yasushi Akimoto

HKT48 singles chronology
"12 Byō" (2015)	"Shekarashika!" (2015)	"74 Okubun no 1 no Kimi e" (2016)

Music video
- "Shekarashika!" (Short Ver.)

Music video
- "Shekarashika!" (Full ver.) (Available April 13)

"Shekarashika!" (しぇからしか！), literally "Too Noisy!", is the sixth single by the Japanese girl idol group HKT48. It features the Japanese rock band Kishidan. The single was released in Japan on November 25, 2015, on the label Universal Sigma.

The CD single sold roughly 281,000 copies in its first week and debuted at number one on the Oricon weekly singles chart.

In order to prevent leaks and piracy, the label decided not to premiere the full version of their music video in M-On until release date, due to being released in a same date of "Cup no Naka no Komorebi", debut single from SKE48 sub-unit Love Crescendo. The full version of this music video was not published along with the release of 74 Okubun no 1 no Kimi e, and its release on YouTube may be delayed a few days due to Kishidan belong to Avex Trax.

"Shekarashika!" was the last single released while HKT48 Theater was located in Hawks Town Mall, as it was closed on 31 March 2016. A new theater will open in Nishitetsu Hall.

== Composition ==
Mainichi Shimbun described the title song as an impressive groovy rock tune whose lyrics express the feeling of true love.

== Details ==
The title track is the theme song of the Nippon TV dorama Majisuka Gakuen 0 Kisarazu Rantōhen (マジすか学園0 木更津乱闘編).

The center position in (the choreography for the) title song is held by Haruka Kodama It was her first solo center position since HKT48's fourth single "Hikaeme I Love You!", because in the fifth single "12 Byō" she shared the center position with Sakura Miyawaki.

== Track listing ==
=== Type A ===
CD
No.	Title	Artist(s)	Length
1.	"Shekarashika!" (しぇからしか！)
2.	"Tasogare no Tandem" (黄昏のタンデム)
3.	"Buddy"	Team H
4.	"Shekarashika! (Instrumental)"
5.	"Tasogare no Tandem (Instrumental)"
6.	"Buddy (Instrumental)"

DVD
No.	Title	Length
1.	"Shekarashika! (Music Video)"
2.	"Buddy (Music Video)"
3.	"Majisuka Gakuen 0 Kisarazu Rantouhen SP"
4.	"Making of "Shekarashika!" MV"

=== Type B ===
CD
No.	Title	Artist(s)	Length
1.	"Shekarashika!" (しぇからしか！)
2.	"Tasogare no Tandem" (黄昏のタンデム)
3.	"Yumemiru Team KIV"	Team KIV
4.	"Shekarashika! (Instrumental)"
5.	"Tasogare no Tandem (Instrumental)"
6.	"Yumemiru Team KIV (Instrumental)"

DVD
No.	Title	Length
1.	"Shekarashika! (Music Video)"
2.	"Yumemiru Team KIV (Music Video)"
3.	"HKT Joint BBQ Tournament Part 1"

=== Type C ===
CD
No.	Title	Artist(s)	Length
1.	"Shekarashika!" (しぇからしか！)
2.	"Tasogare no Tandem" (黄昏のタンデム)
3.	"Ijiwaru Chū"	Nako Yabuki
4.	"Shekarashika! (Instrumental)"
5.	"Tasogare no Tandem (Instrumental)"
6.	"Ijiwaru Chū (Instrumental)"

DVD
No.	Title	Length
1.	"Shekarashika! (Music Video)"
2.	"Ijiwaru Chū (Music Video)"
3.	"HKT Joint BBQ Tournament Part 2"

=== Theater Edition ===
CD
No.	Title	Length
1.	"Shekarashika!" (しぇからしか！)
2.	"Tasogare no Tandem" (黄昏のタンデム)
3.	"Koi no Yubisaki" (恋の指先)
4.	"Shekarashika! (Instrumental)"
5.	"Tasogare no Tandem (Instrumental)"
6.	"Koi no Yubisaki (Instrumental)"

== Personnel ==
=== "Shekarashika!" ===
HKT48 members who participate on the title track are: Chihiro Anai, Manaka Tada, Yui Kojina, Haruka Kodama, Riko Sakaguchi (her first appearance in a senbatsu), Rino Sashihara, Meru Tashima, Miku Tanaka, Mio Tomonaga, Mai Fuchigami, Natsumi Matsuoka, Sakura Miyawaki, Aoi Motomura, Madoka Moriyasu, Nako Yabuki, and Emily Yamashita (her first appearance in a senbatsu).

== Charts ==
Chart (2015)	Peak position
Japan (Oricon Daily Singles Chart)	1
Japan (Oricon Weekly Singles Chart)	1
Japan (Oricon Monthly Singles Chart)	1
Japan (Billboard Japan Top Singles Sales)	1

=== Year-end charts ===
Chart (2015)	Peak position
Japan (Oricon Year-end Singles Chart)	22
