= 3-2 (song) =

2020 single by HKT48

- Type-A cover

Single by HKT48
- B-side: "Oshaberi Jukebox"; "Kiss no Hanabira" (Type A); "How about you?" (Type B); "Seishun no Deguchi" (Theater Edition)
- Released: April 22, 2020
- Genre: J-pop
- Label: Mercury (Universal Music)
- Songwriter(s): Yasushi Akimoto
- Producer(s): Yasushi Akimoto

HKT48 singles chronology
"Ishi" (2019)	"3-2" (2020)	"Kimi to Doko ka e Ikitai" (2021)

Alternative cover
- Cover for Special Edition issue for digital distribution

Music videos
- "3-2" on YouTube
- "おしゃべりジュークボックス (Oshaberi Jukebox) (short version)" on YouTube
- "キスの花びら (Kiss no Hanabira) (Chou)" on YouTube
- "How about you?" on YouTube

"3-2" (さんひくに) is the 13th single by the Japanese idol girl group HKT48. It was released on April 22, 2020. The choreographic center is performed by Hirona Unjo.

This single was released in three different version, Type A, Type B and Theater Edition version. Every version contain a physical CD and DVD except the version of Theater Edition.

The single was ranked first regarding the first week sales based on Oricon and Billboard Japan Hot 100.

== Release ==
This single is released a year after the group last single Ishi in 2019 and also the first single after the graduate member Rino Sashihara. The announcement of single releases was streamed through the group official SHOWROOM channel on March 7, 2020. Meanwhile, the track list of the single was announced a week later.

== Track listing ==
3-2 – Digital Special Edition
No.	Title	Lyrics	Music	Length
1.	"3-2"	Yasushi Akimoto	Katsuhito Sugiyama	3:34
2.	"おしゃべりジュークボックス (Oshaberi Jukebox)"	Yasushi Akimoto	HRK	5:02
3.	"キスの花びら (Kiss no Hanabira)"	Yasushi Akimoto	Ayumu Nakamura, Hiroto Kikuchi	4:37
4.	"How about you?"	Yasushi Akimoto	OICHAN	4:46
5.	"青春の出口 (Seishun no Deguchi)"	Yasushi Akimoto	Kento Yamada	4:46
Total length:				22:45

3-2 – CD Type A (UPCH-80539)
No.	Title	Lyrics	Music	Length
1.	"3-2"	Yasushi Akimoto	Katsuhito Sugiyama	3:34
2.	"おしゃべりジュークボックス (Oshaberi Jukebox)"	Yasushi Akimoto	HRK	5:02
3.	"キスの花びら (Kiss no Hanabira)"	Yasushi Akimoto	Ayumu Nakamura, Hiroto Kikuchi	4:37
4.	"3-2 (Instrumental)"			3:34
5.	"おしゃべりジュークボックス (Oshaberi Jukebox) (Instrumental)"			5:02
6.	"キスの花びら (Kiss no Hanabira) (Instrumental)"			4:39
Total length:				26:28

3-2 – DVD Type A
No.	Title	Director(s)	Length
1.	"3-2" (Music video)	KASICO	3:43
2.	"おしゃべりジュークボックス (Oshaberi Jukebox)" (Music video)		5:07
3.	"キスの花びら (Kiss no Hanabira)" (Music video)		4:39
4.	"HKT48 TikTok ショートビデオ ノンテロップver. Part 1 (HKT48 TikTok Short Video Nonteroppu ver. Part 1)"		13:50

3-2 – CD Type B (UPCH-80540)
No.	Title	Lyrics	Music	Length
1.	"3-2"	Yasushi Akimoto	Katsuhito Sugiyama	3:34
2.	"おしゃべりジュークボックス (Oshaberi Jukebox)"	Yasushi Akimoto	HRK	5:02
3.	"How about you?"	Yasushi Akimoto	OICHAN	4:46
4.	"3-2 (Instrumental)"			3:34
5.	"おしゃべりジュークボックス (Oshaberi Jukebox) (Instrumental)"			5:02
6.	"How about you?"			4:48
Total length:				26:46

3-2 – DVD Type B
No.	Title	Director(s)	Length
1.	"3-2" (Music video)	KASICO	3:43
2.	"おしゃべりジュークボックス (Oshaberi Jukebox)" (Music video)		5:07
3.	"How about you?" (Music video)		4:57
4.	"HKT48 TikTok ショートビデオ ノンテロップver. Part 2 (HKT48 TikTok Short Video Nonteroppu ver. Part 2)"		13:29

3-2 – CD Theater Edition (PRON-5085)
No.	Title	Lyrics	Music	Length
1.	"3-2"	Yasushi Akimoto	Katsuhito Sugiyama	3:34
2.	"おしゃべりジュークボックス (Oshaberi Jukebox)"	Yasushi Akimoto	HRK	5:02
3.	"青春の出口 (Seishun no Deguchi)"	Yasushi Akimoto	Kento Yamada	4:46
4.	"3-2 (Instrumental)"
5.	"おしゃべりジュークボックス (Oshaberi Jukebox) (Instrumental)"
6.	"青春の出口 (Seishun no Deguchi) (Instrumental)"

== Personnel ==
=== "3-2" ===
"3-2" was performed by selection senbatsu performer, consisting of:

- Team H: Yui Kojina, Meru Tashima, Miku Tanaka, Aki Toyonaga, Natsumi Matsuoka, Akari Watanabe
- Team KIV: Hirona Unjo, Nene Jitoe, Anna Murashige, Aoi Motomura, Madoka Moriyasu
- Team TII: Hana Matsuoka, Hinata Matsumoto, Emiri Yamashita
- Kenkyuusei: Kaede Kamijima, Rimika Mizukami

=== "おしゃべりジュークボックス" (Oshaberi Jukebox) ===
"おしゃべりジュークボックス" (Oshaberi Jukebox) was performed by HKT48 栄光のラビリンス CM選抜2020 (HKT48 Eikou no Labyrinth CM Senbatsu 2020), consisting of:

- Team H: Yuka Akiyoshi, Haruka Ueno, Riko Sakaguchi, Meru Tashima, Aki Toyonaga, Akari Watanabe
- Team KIV: Nene Jitoe, Mai Fuchigami
- Team TII: Misaki Aramaki, Ayaka Oda, Sae Kurihara, Moeka Sakai, Erena Sakamoto, Rio Shimizu, Tomoka Takeda
- Kenkyuusei: Kaede Kamijima

=== "キスの花びら" (Kiss no Hanabira) ===
"キスの花びら" (Kiss no Hanabira) was performed by Chou, consisting of:

- Team H: Yui Kojina, Natsumi Matsuoka
- Team KIV: Madoka Moriyasu
- Team TII: Sae Kurihara, Hinata Matsumoto, Sono Miyazaki, Emiri Yamashita

=== "How about you?" ===
"How about you?" was performed by Lit Charm, consisting of:

- Team H: Haruka Ueno, Riko Sakaguchi
- Team KIV: Mina Imada, Serina Kumazawa, Yuki Shimono, Aoi Motomura
- Team TII: Maria Imamura, Hana Matsuoka
- Kenkyuusei: Kurumi Takemoto

=== "青春の出口" (Seishun no Deguchi) ===
"青春の出口" (Seishun no Deguchi) was performed by all active members of HKT48
