= Suki! Suki! Skip! =

- Type A cover

Single by HKT48
- Released: March 20, 2013 (Japan)
- Genre: J-pop
- Label: Universal Sigma
- Songwriter: Yasushi Akimoto
- Producer: Yasushi Akimoto

HKT48 singles chronology
"Suki! Suki! Skip!" (2013)	"Melon Juice" (2013)

Professional ratings
Review scores
Source	Rating
Rolling Stone Japan	2.5/5 stars

"Suki! Suki! Skip!" (スキ!スキ!スキップ!, Suki! Suki! Sukippu!) is the first single by Japanese girl group HKT48. It was released in Japan on March 20, 2013, and "Onegai Valentine" (お願いヴァレンティヌ, Onegai Varentinu) was released through iTunes on February 6, 2013.

== Release ==
Suki! Suki! Skip! was released in Japan on March 20, 2013 in four different versions: Type A, Type B, Type C and the Theater versions.

This is the first time since the formation of all Project 48 groups (AKB48, SKE48, NMB48, HKT48), the center position belongs to a research student, Meru Tashima.

Also, this single is the first time a CD cover has featured only one girl (Meru Tashima) for AKB48's sister groups.

== Track listing ==
=== Type-A ===
CD
No.	Title	Length
1.	"Suki! Suki! Skip!" (スキ!スキ!スキップ!)
2.	"Onegai Valentine" (お願いヴァレンティヌ)
3.	"Kataomoi no Karaage" (片思いの唐揚げ)
4.	"Suki! Suki! Skip! [Instrumental]"
5.	"Onegai Valentine [Instrumental]"
6.	"Kataomoi no Karaage [Instrumental]"

DVD
No.	Title	Length
1.	"Suki! Suki! Skip! Music Video"
2.	"Kataomoi no Karaage Music Video"
3.	"Tokyo Shūgakuryokō" (東京修学旅行)

Kataomoi no Karaage was the ending theme to Japanese dub of My Little Pony: Friendship is Magic during its first season.

=== Type-B ===
CD
No.	Title	Length
1.	"Suki! Suki! Skip!" (スキ!スキ!スキップ!)
2.	"Onegai Valentine" (お願いヴァレンティヌ)
3.	"Ima ga Ichiban" (今がイチバン)
4.	"Suki! Suki! Skip! [Instrumental]"
5.	"Onegai Valentine [Instrumental]"
6.	"Ima ga Ichiban [Instrumental]"

DVD
No.	Title	Length
1.	"Suki! Suki! Skip! Music Video"
2.	"Ima ga Ichiban Music Video"
3.	"Hakata Kankou Annai" (博多観光案内)

=== Type-C ===
CD
No.	Title	Length
1.	"Suki! Suki! Skip!" (スキ!スキ!スキップ!)
2.	"Onegai Valentine" (お願いヴァレンティヌ)
3.	"Seifuku no Banbi" (制服のバンビ)
4.	"Suki! Suki! Skip! [Instrumental]"
5.	"Onegai Valentine [Instrumental]"
6.	"Seifuku no Banbi [Instrumental]"

DVD
No.	Title	Length
1.	"Suki! Suki! Skip! Music Video"
2.	"Collection from one gag all members"

=== Theater Edition ===
CD
No.	Title	Length
1.	"Suki! Suki! Skip!" (スキ!スキ!スキップ!)
2.	"Onegai Valentine" (お願いヴァレンティヌ)
3.	"Kireigoto Demo Iijanaika?" (キレイゴトでもいいじゃないか？)
4.	"Suki! Suki! Skip! [Instrumental]"
5.	"Onegai Valentine [Instrumental]"
6.	"Kireigoto Demo Iijanaika? [Instrumental]"

== Members ==
=== "Suki! Suki! Skip!" ===
- Team H : Chihiro Anai, Nao Ueki, Aika Ota, Haruka Kodama, Rino Sashihara, Yuki Shimono, Chiyori Nakanishi, Natsumi Matsuoka, Sakura Miyawaki, Anna Murashige, Aoi Motomura, Madoka Moriyasu, Haruka Wakatabe
- Kenkyuusei : Meru Tashima, Mio Tomonaga, Mai Fuchigami

=== "Onegai Valentine" ===
- Team H : Chihiro Anai, Nao Ueki, Aika Ota, Haruka Kodama, Rino Sashihara, Yuki Shimono, Chiyori Nakanishi, Natsumi Matsuoka, Sakura Miyawaki, Anna Murashige, Aoi Motomura, Madoka Moriyasu, Haruka Wakatabe
- Kenkyuusei : Meru Tashima, Mio Tomonaga, Mai Fuchigami

=== "Kataomoi no Karage" ===
- Team H: Sakura Miyawaki, Aika Ota, Aoi Motomura, Anna Murashige, Haruka Wakatabe
- Kenkyuusei: Meru Tashima, Mio Tomonaga, Marina Yamada, Izumi Umemoto, Yuka Akiyoshi, Maiko Fukagawa, Yuka Tanaka

=== "Ima ga Ichiban" ===
- Team H : Chihiro Anai, Serina Kumazawa, Haruka Kodama, Rino Sashihara, Natsumi Tanaka, Chiyori Nakanishi, Natsumi Matsuoka, Madoka Moriyasu
- Kenkyuusei : Kyouka Abe, Mina Imada, Marika Tani, Riko Sakaguchi

== Oricon Charts ==
Release	Oricon Singles Chart	Peak position	Debut sales (copies)	Sales total (copies)
March 20, 2013	Daily Chart	1	205,278	284,467
March 20, 2013	Weekly Chart	1	250,147	284,467
March 20, 2013	Monthly Chart	4	264,550	284,467
