= Melon Juice (song) =

Single by HKT48

- Type A cover

Single by HKT48
- Released: September 4, 2013
- Recorded: 2013
- Genre: J-pop

HKT48 singles chronology
"Suki! Suki! Skip!" (2013)	"Melon Juice" (2013)	"Sakura, Minnade Tabeta" (2014)

"Melon Juice" (メロンジュース) is the second single by the Japanese idol group HKT48, released on September 4, 2013. It reached number one on the Oricon and Billboard Japan weekly singles chart.

== Promotion and release ==
"Melon Juice" was released in Japan on September 4, 2013, in four different versions: Type A, Type B, Type C, and the Theater edition.

The centers for the title track were announced to be Meru Tashima and Mio Tomonaga, both of whom are trainees. The title track would also feature five other trainees: Yuka Akiyoshi, Mai Fuchigami, Kanna Okada, Naoko Okamoto, and Marika Tani, the most trainees on a title track for any AKB48 or sister group.

The theater version of the CD features both Tashima and Tomonaga on the cover.

== Track listing ==
=== Type-A ===
CD
No.	Title	Length
1.	"Melon Juice" (メロンジュース)
2.	"Soko de Nani o Kangaeru ka?" (そこで何を考えるか?)
3.	"Kibo no Kairyu (Amakuchi Hime)" (希望の海流 (あまくち姫))
4.	"Melon Juice [Instrumental]"
5.	"Soko de Nani o Kangaeru ka? [Instrumental]"
6.	"Kibo no Kairyu (Amakuchi Hime) [Instrumental]"

DVD
No.	Title	Length
1.	"Melon Juice Music Video"
2.	"Kibo no Kairyu (Amakuchi Hime) Music Video"
3.	"Special Footage "Summer break research project presentation"" (夏休み自由研究発表)

=== Type-B ===
CD
No.	Title	Length
1.	"Melon Juice" (メロンジュース)
2.	"Soko de Nani o Kangaeru ka?" (そこで何を考えるか?)
3.	"Doro no Metronome (Umakuchi Hime)" (泥のメトロノーム (うまくち姫))
4.	"Melon Juice [Instrumental]"
5.	"Soko de Nani o Kangaeru ka? [Instrumental]"
6.	"Doro no Metronome (Umakuchi Hime) [Instrumental]"

DVD
No.	Title	Length
1.	"Melon Juice Music Video"
2.	"Doro no Metronome Music Video"
3.	"Special Footage "Summer break research project presentation"" (夏休み自由研究発表)

=== Type-C ===
CD
No.	Title	Length
1.	"Melon Juice" (メロンジュース)
2.	"Soko de Nani o Kangaeru ka?" (そこで何を考えるか?)
3.	"Nami Oto no Orgel" (波音のオルゴール)
4.	"Melon Juice [Instrumental]"
5.	"Soko de Nani o Kangaeru ka? [Instrumental]"
6.	"Nami Oto no Orgel [Instrumental]"

DVD
No.	Title	Length
1.	"Melon Juice Music Video"
2.	"Melon Juice Making Video"
3.	"Special Footage "Summer break research project presentation"" (夏休み自由研究発表)

=== Theater Edition ===
CD
No.	Title	Length
1.	"Melon Juice" (メロンジュース)
2.	"Soko de Nani o Kangaeru ka?" (そこで何を考えるか?)
3.	"Tenmonbu no Jijo" (天文部の事情)
4.	"Melon Juice [Instrumental]"
5.	"Soko de Nani o Kangaeru ka? [Instrumental]"
6.	"Tenmonbu no Jijo [Instrumental]"

== Personnel ==
=== "Melon Juice" ===
The centers for the title track are Meru Tashima and Mio Tomonaga.

- Team H : Chihiro Anai, Haruka Kodama, Natsumi Matsuoka, Sakura Miyawaki, Madoka Moriyasu, Aoi Motomura, Anna Murashige, Aika Ota, Rino Sashihara
- Kenkyuusei : Yuka Akiyoshi, Mai Fuchigami, Kanna Okada, Naoko Okamoto, Marika Tani, Meru Tashima, Mio Tomonaga

=== "Kibo no Kairyu" ===
Center : Sakura Miyawaki

- Team H : Sakura Miyawaki, Anna Murashige, Aoi Motomura, Aika Ota, Yuki Shimono, Nao Ueki, Haruka Wakatabe
- Kenkyuusei : Yūka Tanaka, Meru Tashima, Mio Tomonaga, Marina Yamada

=== "Doro no Metronome" ===
Center : Haruka Kodama

- Team H: Chihiro Anai, Haruka Kodama, Serina Kumazawa, Natsumi Matsuoka, Madoka Moriyasu, Chiyori Nakanishi, Natsumi Tanaka
- Kenkyuusei: Izumi Goto, Mina Imada, Hiroka Komada, Riko Sakaguchi

=== "Nami Oto no Orgel" ===
- Team H : Haruka Kodama, Sakura Miyawaki, Rino Sashihara
- Kenkyuusei : Meru Tashima, Mio Tomonaga

== Oricon charts ==
Release	Oricon Singles Chart	Peak position	Debut sales (copies)	Sales total (copies)
September 4, 2013	Weekly Chart	1	268,897	
September 4, 2013	Monthly Chart	1	287,245	
