= Twin Planet =

Japanese talent agency

Twin Planet Co., Ltd
- Native name: 株式会社TWIN PLANET
- Type: Kabushiki gaisha (Joint-stock company)
- Traded as: Unlisted
- Industry: Service industry (entertainment)
- Genre: Tarento management, marketing, media production
- Founded: November 1, 2006
- Headquarters: TWIN PLANET South BLDG, 5-46-1, Jingūmae, Shibuya, Tokyo, Japan; ZIP 150-0001
- Area served: Japan
- Key people: Kenji Yajima (Representative)
- Number of employees: 55 (January 2018)
- Subsidiaries: Twin Planet Entertainment; White Base
- Website: www.tp-e.jp

Twin Planet (株式会社TWIN PLANET) is a Japanese marketing firm and talent agency headquartered in Shibuya, Tokyo. It was found in 2006 and focuses on various marketing related businesses in the entertainment industry, including talent management.

The company was established initially as a marketing firm specializing in "Culture Branding", providing services and content production for various media, events and talents. Currently, they continue these services while maintaining themselves as a talent agency mainly for female fashion models and television personalities.

== Current notable talents ==
- Nana Suzuki
- Akari Suda (former SKE48)
- Anna Murashige (former HKT48)
- Miki Nishino (former AKB48)
- Misako Aoki
- Akishibu Project
- Ayane Konuma (former Seishun Koukou 3-nen C-gumi)
- Nako Yabuki (former HKT48)
- Haruka Kodama (former HKT48)
- Mio Tomonaga (former HKT48)
- Misa Etō (former Nogizaka46)
- Ami Noujo (former Nogizaka46)
- Mei Higashimura (former Hinatazaka46)
- Takane no Nadeshiko
- Karen na Ivory
- Atarashii Gakko!
- Taiyo Sugiura
- Ha Yeon-soo
- Ruka (R U Next? contestant)

== Past notable talents ==
- Sifow
- Ayana Tsubaki
- Tenka Hashimoto
- Kazue Akita (former SDN48)
- Chiho Ishida (former STU48)
