= Koki Yamaguchi =

Japanese baseball player (born 2000)

Chiba Lotte Marines – No. 51
- Outfielder, First Baseman
- Born: August 18, 2000 (age 26); Hirano-ku, Osaka, Japan
- Bats: Right Throws: Right

Career statistics (through 2022 season)
- Batting average: .225
- Hits: 118
- Home runs: 25
- Runs batted in: 77
- Stolen base: 1
- Stats at Baseball Reference

Teams
- Chiba Lotte Marines (2019–present)

Koki Yamaguchi (山口 航輝, Yamaguchi Kōki; born August 8, 2000) is a professional Japanese baseball player. Selected in the fourth round of the 2018 NPB Draft from Meioh High School in Akita Prefecture, he plays outfield and first base for the Chiba Lotte Marines.

== Early career ==
Yamaguchi started for Meioh High School from his second year as a two-way player, batting cleanup as well as pitching. In 2017, Meioh advanced to the Summer Koshien tournament, losing in their first game. However, Yamaguchi was unable to pitch due to injury. Yamaguchi served as Meioh's captain in his 3rd year, but Meioh was unable to return to Koshien after losing to Kosei Yoshida's Kanaashi Nogyo High School in the Akita final.

On October 25, 2018, Yamaguchi was drafted in the 4th round of the 2018 NPB draft by the Chiba Lotte Marines, signing for an annual salary of 5.6 million Japanese yen with a 40 million yen bonus. At the time he was drafted, Yamaguchi expressed interest in remaining a two-way player as a professional.

After two years spent exclusively on the second squad, Yamaguchi made his career first squad debut on opening day, March 26, 2021, vs the Fukuoka SoftBank Hawks. He started as the designated hitter for the game and batted 5th, recording his first career hit in the 5th inning vs Hawks starter Shuta Ishikawa. Yamaguchi appeared in 78 games in total his rookie season, posting a slash line of .207/.365/.294 with 9 home runs.

== Pacific League Record ==
In the 6th inning of Game 2 of the 2021 Pacific League Climax Series First Stage, Yamaguchi hit a solo homer off Rakuten Golden Eagles's Tomohiro Anraku, becoming the youngest player to hit a home run in a Pacific League Climax Series game at the age of 21 years and 2 months. The previous record holder was his teammate Hisanori Yasuda, who homered in the previous season's Pacific League Climax Series at the age of 21 years and 6 months.

== Personal life ==
Yamaguchi is married to former AKB48 & HKT48 member and entertainer Aika Ota on November 20, 2023. On October 5, 2024, the couple welcomed their first child, a baby girl.
