= 74 Okubun no 1 no Kimi e =

- Type A cover

Single by HKT48
- A-side: "74 Okubun no 1 no Kimi e"
- B-side: "Chain of Love"; "Taboo no Iro"; "HKT-jou, Ima, Ugoku"; "Einstein Yori Dianna Agron"; "ZuuZuushisa wo Kashite Choudai"
- Released: April 13, 2016 (Japan)
- Genre: J-pop
- Length: 4:05
- Label: Universal Sigma
- Songwriter: Yasushi Akimoto (lyrics)
- Producer: Yasushi Akimoto

HKT48 singles chronology
"Shekarashika!" (2015)	"74 Okubun no 1 no Kimi e" (2016)	"Saikō Kayo" (2016)

Music video
- "74 Okubun no 1 no Kimi e" Not available for YouTube Red regions

74 Okubun no 1 no Kimi e (74億分の1の君へ; To you, the 1 out of 7.4 billion) is the 7th single from the Japanese idol girl group HKT48, released on April 13, 2016 by Universal Music Japan. It was debuted live during a live concert held on March 30, at Marine Messe Fukuoka.

This single was released in five different versions, and in addition, this release occurred in a delicate moment for the group: the HKT closed its old theater, located in the Hawks Town Mall on March 31 and will be opening a new one, located in Nishitetsu Hall on April 28, two weeks after 7th single release.

The single was number-one on the Oricon Weekly Singles Chart, with 238,828 copies sold. It was also number-one on the Billboard Japan Hot 100.

Only full versions from "74 Okubun no 1 no Kimi e" and "HKT-jou, Ima Ugoku" music videos are available on JPopAsia and JPopSuki. Other MVs (in full version) are not available on these sites to date. As the official channel HKT48 does not release full versions from music videos of coupling songs, only "74 Okubun no 1 no Kimi e" (MV Full) will be available along the release of "Saikō Kayo", on September 7, 2016. Instead of M-On, the full-size music video premiered on Space Shower TV.

This is the last single to feature Chihiro Anai, who announced her graduation on June 8, 2016.

== Music ==
The intro from "74 Okubun no 1 no Kimi e" is notable for having similarities with "Octavarium", from American progressive metal band Dream Theater. The chorus of this song has some similarities with "Around the World", from Aqua, as well of choruses of "Start:DASH!!" and "Bokutachi wa Hitotsu no Hikari", from μ's.

== Release ==
When the full version from "74 Okubun no 1 no Kimi e" music video releases (September 6, on Eastern Time), Chihiro Anai was graduated from the group after participating from her last activity as idol, on July 30, 2016. Unfortunately, the Full MV is not available for regions who apply YouTube Red.

== Controversy ==
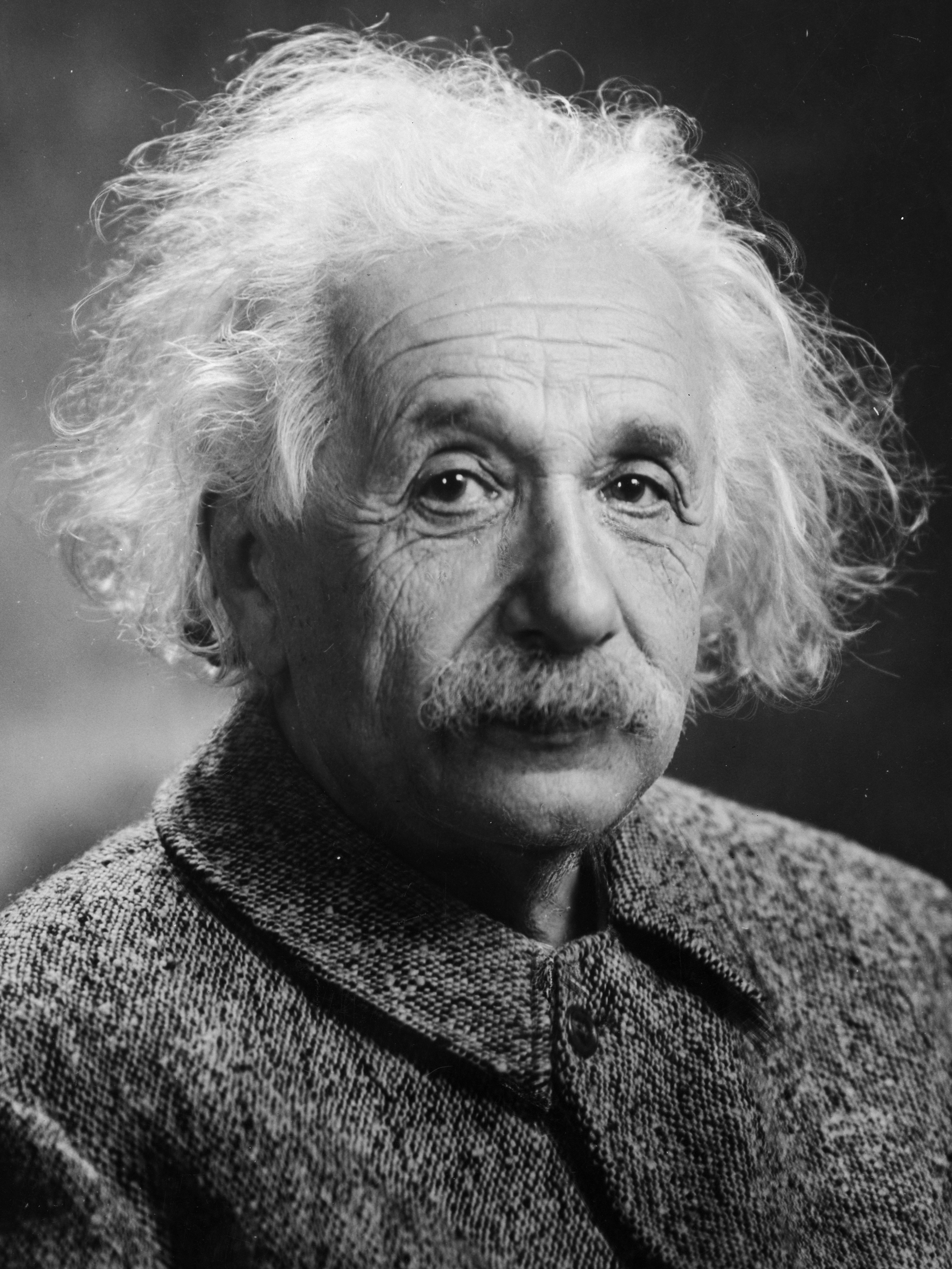
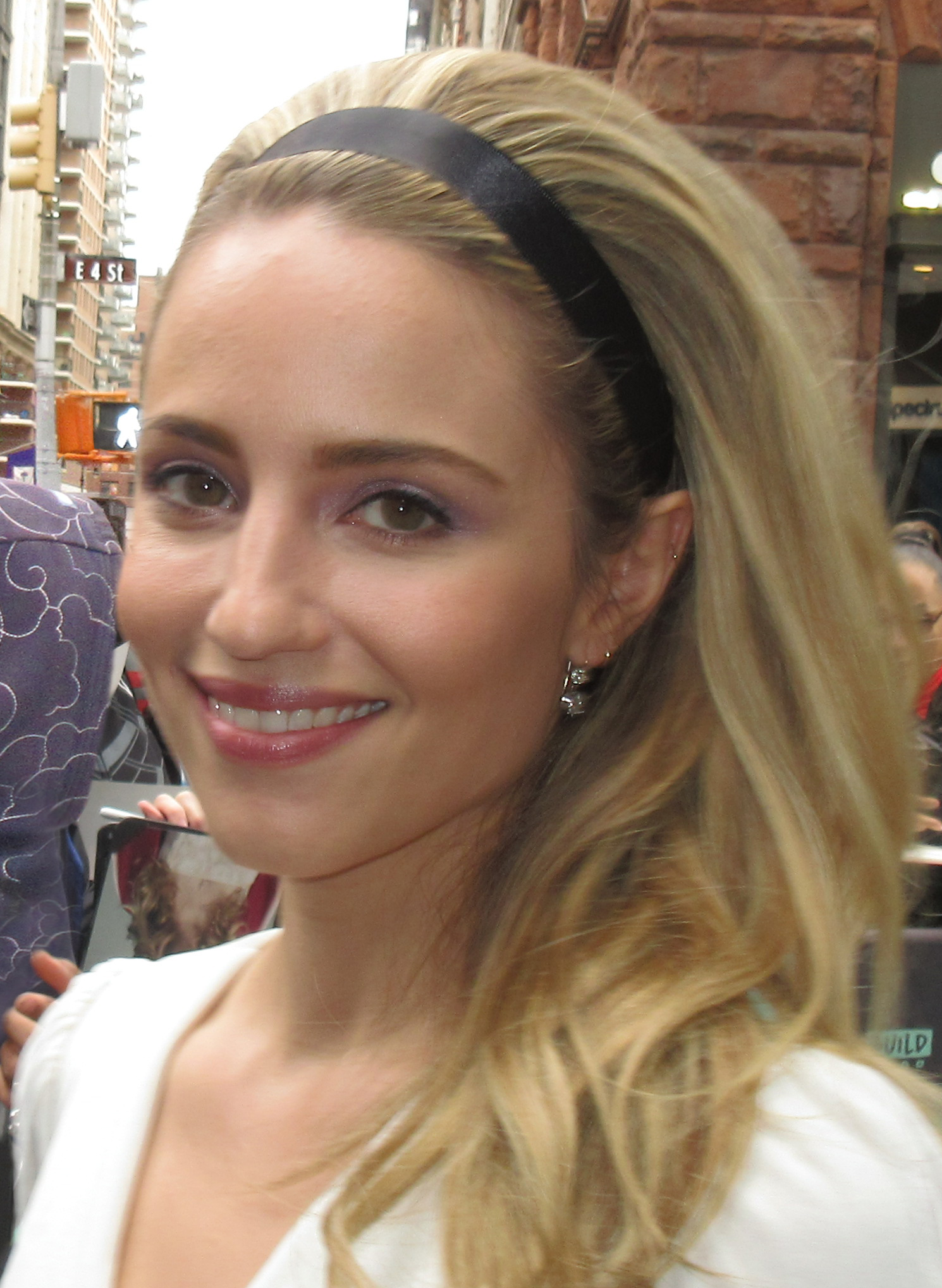
Albert Einstein and Dianna Agron mentioned in the lyrics.

The B-side "Einstein yori Dianna Agron" (NakoMiku & MeroMio), written by group creator Yasushi Akimoto, was a subject of much controversy and received several negative reviews in social media for its themes and messages about the role of young women in society. Comparing scientist Albert Einstein's intelligence and actress Dianna Agron's charm, the song was criticized as misogynistic in tone and message and as insulting to Agron. Some commentators, including The Japan Times, were particularly critical that Akimoto, who at the time was involved in organising the 2020 Tokyo Olympics, would be allowed to represent the nation to the world. Akimoto said that he did not intend to spread discrimination and/or sexual harassment in the lyrics. The full version music video from this song was not released on YouTube by force of contract with the label. The song also received criticism for referring to actress Dianna Agron as empty-headed.

Korean group BTS severed ties with Akimoto in 2018 because of the song, not releasing the song "Bird" from their Japanese EP "Fake Love / Airplane Pt.2" (originally "Bird / Fake Love / Airplane Pt. 2") after "Einstein yori Dianna Agron" resurfaced; Akimoto reportedly wrote the lyrics of "Bird".

In their paper "Manufacturing Identity: Femininity, Discourse and Representation in Japanese Popular Music" (as published as chapter ten of Music in the Making of Modern Japan: Essays on Reception, Transformation and Cultural Flows), Ayako Ōtomo and Aya Satō noted that while Japanese idol groups had originated as a form of modernization, the HKT48 group was an example of persistent social conservatism, which they said "Einstein yori Dianna Agron" exemplified; they wrote that the song "functions as an externally imposed deformation of female identity, even as Japanese society is, in many ways, attempting to move past such hidebound conservatism." They also wrote that Agron and her Glee character, mentioned and depicted as kawaii in the song, are not representative of each other, and that Agron, in fact, represents a Western modernity that in the song "[has] been sidestepped and turned into a justification for sexism". The essay notes that the target audience for such songs is young men who are attracted to a conservative view of family and so prefer to see young women depicted both as youthfully innocent and as the ideal wife, something about which the Western girl group format allowed them to become fanatics.

== Selected Members (Senbatsu) ==
74 Okubun no 1 no Kimi e
Haruka Kodama	Chihiro Anai	Aika Ota	Yui Kojina
Riko Sakaguchi	Rino Sashihara	Meru Tashima	Natsumi Tanaka
Miku Tanaka	Mio Tomonaga	Mai Fuchigami	Natsumi Matsuoka
Hana Matsuoka	Sakura Miyawaki	Madoka Moriyasu	Nako Yabuki
NOTE: The member marked in GREEN is the center for the song. Chihiro Anai graduated in July.

== Track list ==
#	TYPE A	TYPE B	TYPE C	THEATER
01	74 Okubun no 1 no Kimi e			
02	Chain of Love			
03	Taboo no Iro (Sakura Haruka)	HKT-jou, Ima, Ugoku (Platinum Girls)	Einstein Yori Dianna Agron (NakoMiku & MeruMio)	ZuuZuushisa wo Kashite Choudai (Diamond Girls)
04	74 Okubun no 1 no Kimi e (off vocal)			
05	Chain of Love (off vocal)			
06	Taboo no Iro (off vocal)	HKT-jou, Ima, Ugoku (off vocal)	Einstein Yori Dianna Agron (off vocal)	ZuuZuushisa wo Kashite Choudai (off vocal)
