= Nana Suzuki =

Japanese tarento and fashion model (born 1988)

- 鈴木 奈々
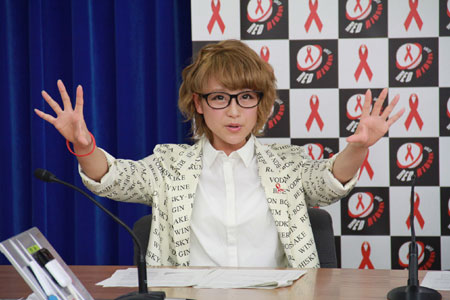
- Born: July 9, 1988 (age 38); Ryūgasaki, Ibaraki, Japan
- Other names: Na-chan (なぁちゃん, Nā-chan)
- Occupation: Model
- Years active: 2007–
- Agent: Twin Planet
- Height: 1.54 m (5 ft 1 in) (2011)

Nana Suzuki (鈴木 奈々, Suzuki Nana; born July 9, 1988, in Ryūgasaki, Ibaraki Prefecture, Japan) is a Japanese tarento and fashion model who is represented by the talent agency Twin Planet. She was a model for the fashion magazine Popteen.

In 2018, she was a contestant on Season 1 of Amazon Prime's Hitoshi Matsumoto presents Freeze, where eight entertainers are competing for 1 million yen, where they sit in a small room where they must endure and not react to various mechanisms by Downtown's Hitoshi Matsumoto.

== Filmography ==
=== TV series ===
Year	Title	Network	Notes
2011	Twin Planet Channel	Ustream	
2011	Imojo Kaizō Keikaku	BeeTV	
2011	Sunday Japon	TBS	Irregular appearances
2012	Cream Quiz Miracle 9	TV Asahi	Irregular appearances
2012	Otona e no Tobira TV	NHK E TV	
2012	Run for Money Tōsō-chū	Fuji TV	
2012	London Hearts	TV Asahi	
	Akashiya TV	MBS	
2014	Jun to Takashi no Shūkan Literacy	Tokyo MX	Commentator
2014	High Noon TV Viking!	Fuji TV	
2018	Hitoshi Matsumoto presents Freeze	Amazon Prime	Season 1 Contestant

=== Magazines ===
Year	Title	Notes
2007	Popteen	
2012	Edge Style	Exclusive

=== Radio series ===
Year	Title	Network	Notes
2010	Gal Raji: Aidesu! Shakai Kōken	Tokyo FM	
2015	Nana Suzuki no Nana Korobi Yaoki	STV Radio, BSN, IBS, YBS, KRY, JRT, RKC	

=== Advertisements ===
Year	Title	Notes
2012	Suberuti "Nonde Chōkirei-hen" "Nonde Chōofukaro-hen"	
2013	Miku Sawai "Sentimental"	
	Rakukon	Image character
	Baitoru.com	
2014	Suntory "Boss Zeitaku Bitō (Bowling-hen)"	
2014	Osaka Ōshō (Eat &) "Kokuhō Buta Gyōza"	
2014	Point Income	
2014	Tokiwa Pharmaceutical "Keana Putty Shokunin"	

=== Music videos ===
Year	Title	Notes
2011	Shingo Fujimori and Ayaman Japan "Natsu Age Motion (Party ver.)"	

== Enterprise collaborations ==
- Nana Suzuki × Prisila Collaboration Wig
- Moonstar × Nana Suzuki Collaboration Shoes
- Nana Suzuki Collaboration Nail Wrap

== Awards ==
Year	Ceremony	Award	Nominated work	Result	References
2011	GRP Award	Best Blogger Award	Nana Suzuki	Nominated	
