= 12 Byō =

Single by HKT48
- A-side: "12 Byō"
- B-side: "Rock Da yo, Jinsei wa..."; "Hohoemi Popcorn" (Type A); "Chameleon Joshikōsei" (Type B); "Hawaii e Ikō" (Type C); "Daite Twintails" (Theater)
- Released: April 22, 2015 (Japan)
- Genre: J-pop
- Label: Universal Music Japan
- Songwriter: Yasushi Akimoto (lyrics)
- Producer: Yasushi Akimoto

HKT48 singles chronology
"Hikaeme I Love You!" (2014)	"12 Byō" (2015)	"Shekarashika!" (2015)

Music video
- "12 Byō" on YouTube

"12 Byō" (12秒, Jūni-byō; lit. "12 Seconds") is the fifth single by the Japanese girl idol group HKT48, released in Japan on April 22, 2015. It reached number one on the Oricon weekly singles chart. As of June 1, 2015, it had sold 296,698 copies.

== Details ==
The centers in the title song are Haruka Kodama and Sakura Miyawaki. Haruka Kodama had previously had the center position in a HKT48 single (in the 4th single "Hikaeme I Love You!"), while for Sakura Miyawaki (who had already been a center in AKB48's 38th single "Kibōteki Refrain", together with Mayu Watanabe), it was the first center position in a single by HKT48.

== Track listing ==
=== Type A ===
CD
No.	Title	Artist(s)	Length
1.	"12 Byō" (12秒)		3:45
2.	"Rock Da yo, Jinsei wa..." (ロックだよ、人生は...)		4:03
3.	"Hohoemi Popcorn" (微笑みポップコーン)	Popcorn Children	3:28
4.	"12 Byō (Instrumental)"		3:44
5.	"Rock Da yo, Jinsei wa... (Instrumental)"		4:03
6.	"Hohoemi Popcorn (Instrumental)"		3:30

DVD
No.	Title	Length
1.	"12 Byō (Music Video)"
2.	"Rock Da yo, Jinsei wa... (Music Video)"
3.	"Hohoemi Popcorn (Music Video)"
4.	"HKT's Kitchen - Bonus Type A"

=== Type B ===
CD
No.	Title	Artist(s)	Length
1.	"12 Byō" (12秒)		3:45
2.	"Rock Da yo, Jinsei wa..." (ロックだよ、人生は...)		4:03
3.	"Chameleon Joshikōsei" (カメレオン女子高生)	Team H	3:19
4.	"12 Byō (Instrumental)"		3:44
5.	"Rock Da yo, Jinsei wa... (Instrumental)"		4:03
6.	"Chameleon Joshikōsei (Instrumental)"		3:21

DVD
No.	Title	Length
1.	"12 Byō (Music Video)"
2.	"Rock Da yo, Jinsei wa... (Music Video)"
3.	"Chameleon Joshikōsei (Music Video)"
4.	"HKT's Kitchen - Bonus Type B"

=== Type C ===
CD
No.	Title	Artist(s)	Length
1.	"12 Byō" (12秒)		3:45
2.	"Rock Da yo, Jinsei wa..." (ロックだよ、人生は...)		4:03
3.	"Hawaii e Ikō" (ハワイヘ行こう)	Team KIV	4:29
4.	"12 Byō (Instrumental)"		3:44
5.	"Rock Da yo, Jinsei wa... (Instrumental)"		4:03
6.	"Hawaii e Ikō (Instrumental)"		4:31

DVD
No.	Title	Length
1.	"12 Byō (Music Video)"
2.	"Rock Da yo, Jinsei wa... (Music Video)"
3.	"Hawaii e Ikō (Music Video)"
4.	"HKT's Kitchen - Bonus Type C"

=== Theater Edition ===
CD
No.	Title	Artist(s)	Length
1.	"12 Byō" (12秒)		3:45
2.	"Rock Da yo, Jinsei wa..." (ロックだよ、人生は...)		4:03
3.	"Daite Twintails" (抱いてツインテール)	Blueberry Pie	4:45
4.	"12 Byō (Instrumental)"		3:44
5.	"Rock Da yo, Jinsei wa... (Instrumental)"		4:03
6.	"Daite Twintails (Instrumental)"		4:47

== Members ==
"Hohoemi Popcorn"

Performed by Popcorn Children (ポップコーンチルドレン).

- Team H: Miku Tanaka, Nako Yabuki
- Team Kenkyūsei: Misaki Aramaki, Sae Kurihara, Erena Sakamoto, Riko Tsutsui, Hazuki Hokazono, Yūna Yamauchi, Emili Yamashita

"Daite Twintails"

Performed by Blueberry Pie (ブルーベリーパイ).

- Team H : Yui Kojina, Hiroka Komada, Riko Sakaguchi
- Team Kenkyūsei : Misaki Aramaki, Sae Kurihara

== Charts ==
Chart (2015)	Peak position	Debut sales
Japan (Oricon Daily Singles Chart)	1	
Japan (Oricon Weekly Singles Chart)	1	277,916
Japan (Oricon Monthly Singles Chart)	2	

=== Year-end charts ===
Chart (2015)	Peak position
Japan (Oricon Year-end Singles Chart)	20
