= Hikaeme I Love You! =

- Type A cover

Single by HKT48

from the album Hikaeme I Love You!
- B-side: "Ima Kimi o Omou"; "Idol no Ōja"; "Natsu no Mae"; "Namaiki Lips"; "Watashi wa Blueberry Pie"
- Released: September 24, 2014 (Japan)
- Genre: J-pop
- Label: Universal Music Japan
- Songwriter: Yasushi Akimoto (lyrics)
- Producer: Yasushi Akimoto

HKT48 singles chronology
| "Sakura, Minnade Tabeta" (2014) | "Hikaeme I Love You!" (2014) | "12 Byō" (2015) |

"Hikaeme I Love You!" (控えめI love you !) , literally "Carefully I Love You!", is the 4th single by Japanese idol girl group HKT48. It was released on September 24, 2014. It debuted in number one on the weekly Oricon Singles Chart and reached number one on the Billboard Japan Hot 100. As of October 20, 2014 (issue date), it has sold a total of 290,044 copies. It was the best-selling single in Japan in September 2014. It was the 21st best-selling single of the year in Japan, with 308,251 copies.

== Track listing ==
=== Type A ===
CD
| No. | Title | Length |
|---|---|---|
| 1. | "Hikaeme I love you!" (控えめI love you!) |
| 2. | "Ima Kimi o Omou" (今 君を想う) |
| 3. | "Idol no Ōja" (アイドルの王者) |
| 4. | "Hikaeme I love you! (Instrumental)" |
| 5. | "Ima Kimi o Omou (Instrumental)" |
| 6. | "Idol no Ōja (Instrumental)" |

DVD
| No. | Title | Length |
|---|---|---|
| 1. | "Hikaeme I love you! (Music Video)" |
| 2. | "Idol no Ōja (Music Video)" |
| 3. | "Special Movie: HKT48 Tour Report from Ōita, Miyazaki, Kumamoto" (特典映像「HKT48 九州7県ツアー ご当地レポ（大分・宮崎・熊本）」) |

=== Type B ===
CD
| No. | Title | Length |
|---|---|---|
| 1. | "Hikaeme I love you!" (控えめI love you!) |
| 2. | "Ima Kimi o Omou" (今 君を想う) |
| 3. | "Natsu no Mae" (夏の前) |
| 4. | "Hikaeme I love you! (Instrumental)" |
| 5. | "Ima Kimi o Omou (Instrumental)" |
| 6. | "Natsu no Mae (Instrumental)" |

DVD
| No. | Title | Length |
|---|---|---|
| 1. | "Hikaeme I love you! (Music Video)" |
| 2. | "Natsu no Mae (Music Video)" |
| 3. | "Special Movie: HKT48 Tour Report from Kagoshima, Saga, Nagasaki" (特典映像「HKT48 九州7県ツアー ご当地レポ（鹿児島・佐賀・長崎）」) |

=== Type C ===
CD
| No. | Title | Length |
|---|---|---|
| 1. | "Hikaeme I love you!" (控えめI love you!) |
| 2. | "Ima Kimi o Omou" (今 君を想う) |
| 3. | "Namaiki Lips" (生意気リップス) |
| 4. | "Hikaeme I love you! (Instrumental)" |
| 5. | "Ima Kimi o Omou (Instrumental)" |
| 6. | "Namaiki Lips (Instrumental)" |

DVD
| No. | Title | Length |
|---|---|---|
| 1. | "Hikaeme I love you! (Music Video)" |
| 2. | "Namaiki Lips (Music Video)" |
| 3. | "Special Movie: HKT48 Party on luxury liner" (特典映像「HKT48『進め!めんたい号!ちょっと豪華客船 貸切り船上パーティー』」) |

=== Theater Edition ===
CD
| No. | Title | Length |
|---|---|---|
| 1. | "Hikaeme I love you!" (控えめI love you!) |
| 2. | "Ima Kimi o Omou" (今 君を想う) |
| 3. | "Watashi wa Blueberry Pie" (私はブルーベリーパイ) |
| 4. | "Hikaeme I love you! (Instrumental)" |
| 5. | "Ima Kimi o Omou (Instrumental)" |
| 6. | "Watashi wa Blueberry Pie (Instrumental)" |
