= Haruka Kodama =

Japanese actress (born 1996)

- 兒玉 遥
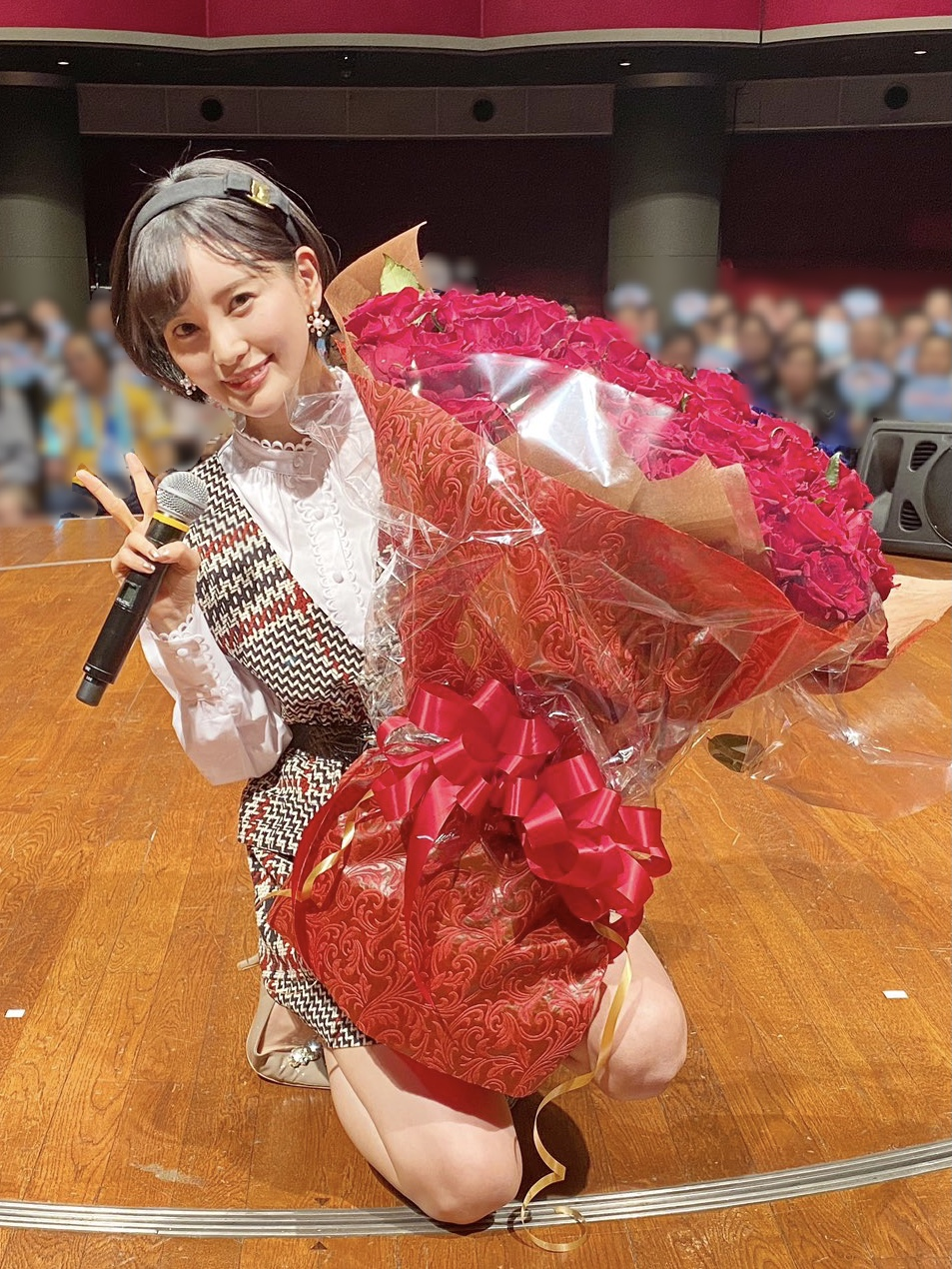
- Kodama at a fan club meeting December 2019
- Born: 19 September 1996 (age 29); Miyazaki Prefecture, Japan
- Occupations: Actress; singer
- Years active: 2011–2017; 2019–present
- Musical career
- Also known as: Haruppi (はるっぴ)
- Origin: Hakata-ku, Fukuoka, Japan
- Instrument: Vocals
- Years active: 2011–2017
- Formerly of: HKT48; AKB48

YouTube information
- Channel: Kodama Channel
- Years active: 2022–present
- Genres: Vlog; fashion
- Subscribers: 114,000
- Views: 16,835,141
- Last updated: 14 July 2026

Haruka Kodama (兒玉 遥, Kodama Haruka; born 19 September 1996) is a Japanese actress and former member of the idol girl groups HKT48 and AKB48. Nicknamed Haruppi (はるっぴ), she has been the lead performer of three HKT48 singles: "Hikaeme I Love You!" (2014), "12 Byō" (2015, with Sakura Miyawaki), and "Shekarashika!" (2015).

== Career ==
=== 2011–12: Pre-debut activities ===
On 10 July 2011, Kodama passed the first generation audition for HKT48. She made her first appearance as an HKT48 trainee member on 23 October, together with other first generation trainees at the "Flying Get National Handshake Event" in Seibu Dome. One month later, she debuted on stage at HKT48's newly built theater. The group performed a revival of SKE48 Team S's stage "Te o Tsunaginagara" (手をつなぎながら, While Holding Hands), with Kodama serving as the center.

In January 2012, Kodama was announced on the lineup for AKB48's 25th single "Give Me Five!". She provided vocals for the B-side "New Ship". This was the first time an HKT48 member participated in an AKB48 single. On 26 February, she visited Shiogama, Miyagi Prefecture with six other AKB48 members as part of AKB48's 2011 Miyagi earthquake charity project "Dareka no Tame ni Project" (「誰かのために」プロジェクト, For Someone Project). On 4 March, she was promoted to a full member of HKT48's Team H, along with 15 other girls. Later that month, she was chosen to feature on AKB48's 26th single "Manatsu no Sounds Good!". This was the first time an HKT48 member featured on an AKB48 A-side single.

=== 2013–16: Debut and rising popularity ===
HKT48 released its first single "Suki! Suki! Skip!" on 20 March 2013. On 28 April, the final day of AKB48's spring concert at the Nippon Budokan, Kodama was chosen to be a concurrent member of AKB48's Team A. From May to 8 June, AKB48 held their annual Senbatsu Sōsenkyo (選抜総選挙, Selection General Election), an event that allows fans to vote their favourite members from AKB48 Group into the promotional line-up of AKB48's next single. Kodama received 18,145 votes and ranked 37th out of 283 members. She later sang on the "Koi Suru Fortune Cookie" B-side "Kondo Koso Ecstasy" (今度こそエクスタシー, Ecstasy This Time). On 19 June, she made her first appearance as a member of AKB48's Team A and performed at the AKB48 theater in Akihabara, Tokyo for the first time.

At AKB48's reshuffling event held on 24 February 2014, Kodama was moved from AKB48's Team A to Team K. In June, she ranked 21st at the annual AKB48 Senbatsu Sōsenkyo, and sang on the "Kokoro no Placard" B-side "Dareka ga Nageta Ball" (誰かが投げたボール, The Ball that Someone Threw). On 31 August, she was chosen to center HKT48's fourth single "Hikaeme I Love You!". The single sold over 300,000 copies and was the 21st best-selling single of the year in Japan.

On 22 March 2015, she was chosen to center HKT48's fifth single "12 Byō", along with fellow member Sakura Miyawaki. Kodama ranked 17th at the annual AKB48 Senbatsu Sōsenkyo in June, making her the center of Undergirls (ranks 17 to 32). She later sang on "Halloween Night"'s main B-side "Sayonara Surfboard" (さよならサーフボード, Goodbye Surfboard). In October, HKT48 announced that its next single, "Shekarashika!", would be a collaboration with rock band Kishidan. Kodama was chosen to be the center of the single. "12 Byō" and "Shekarashika!" both sold around 300,000 copies and were the 20th and 22nd best-selling singles, respectively, of the year in Japan.

At the annual AKB48 Senbatsu Sōsenkyo in June 2016, Kodama received 60,591 votes and ranked 9th, making her a member of the main line-up of AKB48's 45th single, "Love Trip / Shiawase o Wakenasai". The single sold over 1,200,000 copies and was the third best-selling single of the year in Japan. On 27 July 27, Kodama released her first photobook, titled Rock On. With approximately 7,000 copies sold in the first week according to Oricon, it debuted at number-two on Oricon Photobook Chart.

=== 2017–present: Hiatus and acting career ===
In mid-February 2017, Kodama ceased activities citing poor physical health. She returned on 14 April for the final performance of HKT48's Kantō concert tour at NHK Hall. At AKB48's 12 Anniversary concert on 8 December, it was announced that Kodama's concurrent position in AKB48's Team B would be ending. On 27 December, HKT48's management announced that Kodama was going on hiatus due to poor health condition. Her concurrent position in AKB48 was cancelled on 1 April 2018.

On June 9, 2019, Kodama left HKT48 and switched agencies to Avex Asunaro to pursue an acting career. In March 2021, she revealed that her hiatus was due to bipolar disorder.

== Filmography ==
=== Film ===
Year	Title	Role	Notes	Ref.
2016	9 Windows: Dark Lake	Makoto Mizumoto	Lead role	
2022	Haiiro no Kabe	Hostess		
2022	Break in the Clouds	Maika	Lead role	
2022	Nagisa ni Saku Hana	Nagisa	Lead role	
2025	The Deepest Space In Us			
2026	Manta Okamoto	Sato		

=== Television ===
Year	Title	Role	Notes	Ref.
2012	Fukuoka Renai Hakusho Part 7	Haruka Horiuchi	Episode: "Hatsukoi no Uta"	
2013	Tsunagāru!: Ashita ni Yell	Nozomi	1 episode	
2015	Majisuka Gakuen 5	Katsuzetsu	5 episodes	
2015	Majisuka Gakuen 0: Kisarazu Rantōhen	Katsuzetsu	1 episode	
2015	AKB Horror Night: Adrenaline no Yoru	Saori	Episode: "Room Share"	
2016	AKB Love Night: Koi Kōjō	Natsuki	Episode: "Shinjū"	
2016	Kyabasuka Gakuen	Katsuzetsu (Tai)	10 episodes	
2017	Tōfu Pro Wrestling	Haruka Kodama / Emerald Haruka	13 episodes	
2020	Oblique	Sawako Akebono	12 episodes	
2024	Omusubi	Sayaka Kawai	Asadora	

=== Commercials ===
Year	Title	Product	Company	Notes	Ref.
2014–present	Crazy Gum Station "Delusional Gum Date"	Chewing gum	Lotte	Compilation	
2016–present	NHK Net Radio Distribution Area Expansion	Live streaming	NHK	Fukuoka area	

== Bibliography ==
=== Books ===
- "10% Immortal Butterfly": 730 Days of a Former Idol Overcoming Depression (September 19, 2025, KADOKAWA) ASIN : B0FH6QLJHN

=== Photobooks ===
- Kodama Haruka First Photobook "Rock On" (兒玉遥 ファースト写真集 『 ロックオン 』) (July 2016, Wani Books) ISBN 978-4847048548
- Stay 25 (November 2022, Wani Books) ISBN 978-4847084577
