= Mio Tomonaga =

Japanese media personality and sushi chef, former idol singer

- 朝長 美桜
- Born: 17 May 1998 (age 28); Fukuoka Prefecture, Japan
- Occupations: Media personality; sushi chef
- Spouse: Sōto Yamauchi (m. 2025)
- Musical career
- Genres: J-pop
- Years active: 2012–2019
- Formerly of: HKT48; AKB48

Mio Tomonaga (朝長 美桜, Tomonaga Mio; May 17, 1998) is a Japanese media personality, sushi chef, and former idol. She was a member of the girl groups HKT48 and AKB48. She graduated from sushi chef school in 2025 and has operated her own monthly pop-up sushi restaurant since 2026.

In HKT48, Tomonaga was in Team KIV, and in AKB48 in Team B. She announced her departure from HKT48 and AKB48 in late 2019.

== Career ==
Tomonaga began her journey with HKT48 in 2012, passing the final round of auditions for the second-generation members on June 23. Introduced as a trainee in September 23, she made her theater debut in "The Party is Starting" by the end of the month. Despite being a trainee, she was chosen in December as part of the selection committee for HKT48's first original song, "Hatsukoi Butterfly", a coupling track for AKB48’s 29th single, "Eien Pressure".

Her rise continued in 2013 when she was selected for AKB48's 31st single, "Sayonara Crawl", and ranked 59th in the AKB48 32nd Single General Election, earning her a spot in the Future Girls lineup. That summer, she co-founded the spin-off unit Tentoumu Chu! with several other trainees from AKB48, SKE48, NMB48, and HKT48. She reached a milestone in September, securing a double-center position for HKT48’s second single, "Melon Juice", alongside Meru Tashima.

2014 marked a significant transition, as Tomonaga was promoted from trainee to Team KIV in January, and in February, she was announced as a concurrent member of AKB48 Team B. That same year, she continued her streak of double-center appointments with "Sakura, Minnade Tabeta". In the AKB48 37th Single General Election, she ranked 27th, earning an Under Girls position. Her journey took another turn in 2015 when she transferred from Team B to Team 4. She maintained her Under Girls status in the AKB48 41st Single General Election, ranking 21st. By 2016, she continued to secure a position in the Under Girls lineup, ranking 23rd in the AKB48 45th Single General Election.

On March 30, 2016, Tomonaga released her first photobook, titled Hinata. With approximately 10,000 copies sold in the first week according to Oricon, it debuted in the second place of the Oricon Photobook Chart and in the 20th place of the general Oricon Book Chart.

In December 2017, during the AKB48 Theater 12th Anniversary Performance, an internal reshuffle ended her concurrent position in AKB48 Team 4. The following year, she announced that she had been struggling with knee pain and was diagnosed with meniscus tear, leading her to take a break from performances.

By 2019, she participated in the Kobe Collection after winning first place in a Showroom streaming platform event. However, in December, she announced her graduation from HKT48, citing ongoing difficulties due to her knee injury. She expressed her desire to "bring smiles to people" in a new way.

Her post-idol career started in 2020 with the launch of her official fan club, mioroom, and her original brand, Amy. In 2024, she signed with the talent agency Twin Planet, joining fellow former AKB48 Group idols such as Akari Suda and Anna Murashige.

In 2025, Tomonaga revealed that she had completed her training at a sushi chef school. Since April 2026, while continuing to hone her skills, she has rented a space once a month at the Sushi Satoru in Ebisu, Shibuya, to run her own restaurant exclusively for her fan club members, as a place where fans can "watch her grow" as a sushi chef.

== Personal life ==
In 2025, Tomonaga announced her marriage to engineer and businessman Sōto Yamauchi (山内奏人). She shared, "After meeting him, I've learned what it means to love someone, the warmth of love, and the happiness of being together with someone I love. Everyday is filled with gentle moments."

== Discography ==
Singles
Year	Title	Role	References
April 10, 2019	Will		

== Filmography ==
TV dramas
Year	Title	Role	References
2013-2014	Joshikō Keisatsu	Herself	

== Bibliography ==
=== Photobooks ===
- Tomonaga Mio First Photobook "Hinata" (朝長美桜ファースト写真集「日向」) (30 March 2016, Kodansha) ISBN 978-4063649864
