= HKT48 =

Japanese idol group

- Official logo

Background information
- Origin: Fukuoka, Japan
- Genres: Pop, J-pop, Teen pop, Bubblegum pop
- Years active: 2011–present
- Label: EMI (UMG)
- Member of: AKB48 Group
- Members: Team H details Team KIV details Team TII details
- Website: www.hkt48.jp

HKT48 (read "H.K.T. Forty-eight") is a Japanese idol group produced by Yasushi Akimoto. HKT48 is named after the Hakata-ku ward of Fukuoka, where Akimoto originally intended to base the group. The group performs at City Bank HKT48 Theater in Fukuoka and has sold nearly 4 million copies of CDs in Japan.

== History ==
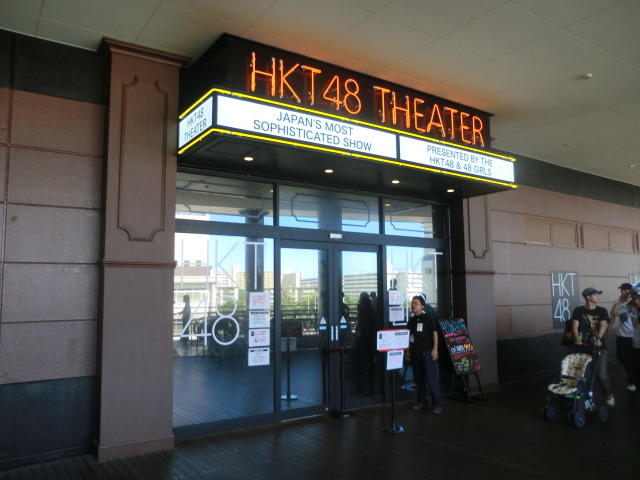
Old HKT48 theater, at Hawks Town Mall

Plans for a group entitled HKT48 were first revealed by AKB48 producer Yasushi Akimoto on November 19, 2008. HKT48 was officially announced on May 1, 2011, at an AKB48 handshake event. The group was the fourth AKB48 sister group to be launched, after the groups SKE48, SDN48 and NMB48. While the group took its name from its proposed base location of Hakata-ku, Fukuoka, HKT48 was eventually based at a theater in the Hawks Town Mall in neighboring Chūō-ku, Fukuoka. This location is next to the Fukuoka Yahoo! Japan Dome. In addition, it was announced that the group would be accepting applications from girls aged between 11 and 22. The first round of the first HKT48 audition took place from May 31, 2011, and successful applicants took part in the second round of auditions, consisting of a singing and dancing test, in the first half of July 2011. The final auditions were held at Hilton Fukuoka Sea Hawk Hotel on July 10 and 24 candidates successfully passed the final.

After undergoing dance and vocal lessons, HKT48's 21 first-generation members were first revealed at an AKB48 handshake event on October 23, 2011, at Seibu Dome. Of these 21 members, 17 were junior high school students or below, and two were elementary-school students. The youngest member of the group, Natsumi Tanaka, was born in 2000, and was 11 years old at the time of the announcement. She said that "joining AKB48 is my ambition since I was 5 years old, so it feels like a dream to be in this group." The oldest member was Yūko Sugamoto, who was 17 years old at the time of the announcement.

They debuted at HKT48 Theater on November 26, 2011, and have been performing sets of songs entitled "Te o Tsunaginagara", which had been originally performed by SKE48 Team S and KII. On December 31, 2011, 16 members appeared on the stage of the 62nd edition of "NHK Kōhaku Uta Gassen", as one of the sister groups of AKB48. On March 4, 2012, the first 16 members were selected to form Team H, and appeared on the stage. On June 20, 2012, Rino Sashihara from AKB48 transferred to HKT48 and as of 2012 was HKT48's oldest member.

On June 23, 2012, the final auditions for the second generation were held, and 34 candidates out of 48 finalists has passed the final. On August 18, 2012, the management announced that five members, three from Team H, Komori, Sugamoto and Taniguchi, and two Kenkyusei – Eto and A. Nakanishi, would be resigning from HKT48 "due to personal reasons". On August 24, 2012, it was announced on the first day of the AKB48 concert at Tokyo Dome that Aika Ota, one of AKB48 Team A members, would be transferred to HKT48. On September 23, 2012, HKT48's second generation research students were announced.

HKT48 released their debut single, "Suki Suki Skip!" on March 20, 2013, under the Universal Sigma record label.

On March 31, 2016, the existing theater located at Hawks Town Mall was closed, with a special farewell performance. A new temporary theater opened in Nishitetsu Hall, also in Chūō-ku, Fukuoka, on April 28, 2016.

In mid-2018, 10 members of HKT48 joined Produce 48, a South Korean competition television show on Mnet to form a girl group. Members Sakura Miyawaki and Nako Yabuki finished in 2nd and 6th placed respectively, both earning themselves a spot to debut in IZ*ONE.

On November 2, 2020, the new and permanent theatre was opened in BOSS E・ZO FUKUOKA. The theatre was named "Nishi-Nippon City Bank HKT48 Theater".

On May 15, 2021, both Sakura Miyawaki and Nako Yabuki returned to HKT48. Sakura Miyawaki also announced her graduation, which took place on June 27, 2021.

On October 16, 2022, during HKT48 11th anniversary concert, Nako Yabuki announced her graduation from the group with graduation concert would be held in Spring 2023.

== Members ==
Team H's formation was announced at HKT48 theater on March 4, 2012. At the conference, it was also announced that 16 members were selected and 5 members remained as a trainee. On January 11, 2014, during their first exclusive concert tour in Ōita, a theater manager Rino Sashihara announced a new Team KIV and promotion of 17 members from the trainees. On March 30, 2016, the group announced that Team TII was formed and 10 trainees were promoted from 3rd generation and 2nd Generation draft members.

On November 26, 2017, the group announced that all 10 trainees from 4th generation were promoted and assigned to the existing 3 teams, one to Team H, two to Team KIV, and seven to Team TII.

On April 9, 2021, the group announced that 4 trainees from the 5th generation were promoted and assigned to two teams, two to Team H and two to Team KIV.

On October 16, 2022, the group will end its current three-team system with Team TII ceased and start its two-team activities with Team H and Team KIV in February 2023. It is also announced a new captain for both Teams H and Team KIV respectively.

=== Team H ===
Team H is associated with the color Sulu Green, the current captain is Toyonaga Aki.

Name	Birth date (age)	Election rank									
Name	Birth date (age)	1	2	3	4	5	6	7	8	9	10
Yuka Akiyoshi (秋吉 優花)	October 24, 2000 (age 25)					N/A	N/A	N/A	72	83	73
Yueru Ito (伊藤 優絵瑠)	October 24, 2003 (age 22)										N/A
Rina Kuriyama (栗山 梨奈)	December 30, 2000 (age 25)										
Riko Sakaguchi (坂口 理子)	July 26, 1994 (age 31)					N/A	60	37	59	49	114
Rino Sakamoto (坂本 りの)	June 10, 2002 (age 24)										
Miku Tanaka (田中 美久)	September 12, 2001 (age 24)						N/A	N/A	45	28	10
Aki Toyonaga (豊永 阿紀)	October 25, 1999 (age 26)									79	83
Wakana Murakami (村上 和叶)	March 30, 2003 (age 23)										
Akari Watanabe (渡部愛加里)	October 18, 2004 (age 21)										N/A

=== Team KIV ===
Team KIV is associated with the color Charlotte Blue, the current captain is Aoi Motomura.

Name	Birth date (age)	Election rank									
Name	Birth date (age)	1	2	3	4	5	6	7	8	9	10
Ibuki Ishibashi (石橋颯)	July 22, 2005 (age 20)										
Airi Ichimura (市村愛里)	February 13, 2001 (age 25)										
Hirona Unjō (運上 弘菜)	August 9, 1998 (age 27)									N/A	84
Hijiri Kawahira (川平聖)	June 27, 2004 (age 22)										
Yuki Shimono (下野 由貴)	April 2, 1998 (age 28)				N/A	N/A	N/A	N/A	98	87	85
Kurumi Takemoto (竹本くるみ)	February 22, 2004 (age 22)										
Iori Tanaka (田中伊桜莉)	August 31, 2002 (age 23)										
Nene Jitoe (地頭江 音々)	September 27, 2000 (age 25)									N/A	117
Miyabi Nagano (長野雅)	October 3, 1999 (age 26)										
Sayaka Baba (馬場彩華)	October 3, 1999 (age 26)										N/A
Mai Fuchigami (渕上 舞)	September 21, 1996 (age 29)					N/A	N/A	31	40	34	40
Aoi Motomura (本村 碧唯)	May 31, 1997 (age 29)				N/A	N/A	48	80	36	62	71

=== Team TII ===
Team TII is associated with the color Golden Yellow, the current captain is Emiri Yamashita and the current co-captain is Hazuki Hokazono.

Name	Birth date (age)	Election rank				
Name	Birth date (age)	6	7	8	9	10
Misaki Aramaki (荒巻 美咲)	January 28, 2001 (age 25)	N/A	N/A	N/A	N/A	N/A
Maria Imamura (今村 麻莉愛)	September 14, 2003 (age 22)			N/A	N/A	N/A
Ayaka Oda (小田 彩加)	February 9, 1999 (age 27)				N/A	50
Sae Kurihara (栗原 紗英)	June 20, 1996 (age 30)	N/A	N/A	N/A	N/A	96
Hinano Goto (後藤 陽菜乃)	March 8, 2005 (age 21)					
Moeka Sakai (堺 萌香)	August 25, 1998 (age 27)				N/A	N/A
Erena Sakamoto (坂本 愛玲菜)	September 12, 2000 (age 25)	N/A	N/A	N/A	N/A	87
Ai Seki (石 安伊)	March 8, 2005 (age 21)					N/A
Tomoka Takeda (武田 智加)	February 25, 2003 (age 23)				N/A	N/A
Hazuki Hokazono (外薗 葉月)	January 17, 1999 (age 27)	N/A	N/A	N/A	N/A	120
Hana Matsuoka (松岡 はな)	January 19, 2000 (age 26)			N/A	80	66
Hinata Matsumoto (松本 日向)	December 21, 2000 (age 25)				N/A	N/A
Sono Miyazaki (宮崎想乃)	October 30, 2000 (age 25)				N/A	N/A
Bibian Murakawa (村川 緋杏)	December 3, 1999 (age 26)			N/A	N/A	N/A
Yūna Yamauchi (山内 祐奈)	July 6, 1999 (age 26)	N/A	N/A	N/A	N/A	N/A
Emiri Yamashita (山下 エミリー)	December 19, 1998 (age 27)	N/A	N/A	N/A	N/A	

=== Kenkyuusei members ===
Name	Birth date (age)
Rina Ikuno (生野 莉奈)	August 3, 2010 (age 15)
Miyu Izawa (井澤 美優)	August 14, 2006 (age 19)
Yuina Ishimatsu (石松 結菜)	January 28, 2012 (age 14)
Hanna Ihara (猪原 絆愛)	February 27, 2011 (age 15)
Kokoha Eguchi (江口 心々華)	April 23, 2007 (age 19)
Ouchi Rinka (大内 梨果)	July 28, 2007 (age 18)
Oba Risaki (大庭 凛咲)	April 23, 2005 (age 21)
Yuna Kawashima (川島夕奈)	July 28, 2008 (age 17)
Hiiro Kitagawa (北川 陽彩)	January 23, 2004 (age 22)
Mina Shibui (渋井 美奈)	March 23, 2009 (age 17)
Kokoro Tachibana (立花 心良)	June 24, 2009 (age 17)
Karen Fukui (福井 可憐)	December 4, 2006 (age 19)
Kokoha Fujino (藤野 心葉)	May 25, 2008 (age 18)
Urara Matsumoto (松本 羽麗)	May 12, 2004 (age 22)
Nanaka Mogami (最上 奈那華)	January 28, 2001 (age 25)
Morisaki Saaya (森崎冴彩)	January 16, 2005 (age 21)
Hina Yasui (安井 妃奈)	February 9, 2011 (age 15)
Reia Yanase (梁瀬 鈴雅)	June 29, 2006 (age 19)

=== Graduated members ===
==== Team H ====
Name _{(Birthdate)}	Election										Notes
Name _{(Birthdate)}	1	2	3	4	5	6	7	8	9	10	Notes
Yui Komori (古森 結衣) (December 2, 1997)				N/A							Resigned on August 18, 2012.
Yuko Sugamoto (菅本 裕子) (May 20, 1994)				N/A							Resigned on August 18, 2012.
Airi Taniguchi (谷口 愛理) (March 14, 1999)				N/A							Resigned on August 18, 2012.
Izumi Umemoto (梅本 泉) (May 15, 1997)					N/A	N/A	N/A				Graduated on December 27, 2015.
Chihiro Anai (穴井 千尋) (January 27, 1996)				N/A	N/A	39	33				Graduated on July 31, 2016.
Haruka Wakatabe (若田部 遥) (September 26, 1998)				N/A	N/A	N/A	N/A	82			Graduated on January 12, 2017.
Naoko Okamoto (岡本 尚子) (April 4, 1996)					N/A	N/A	N/A	N/A			Graduated on May 8, 2017.
Yuriya Inoue (井上 由莉耶) (June 15, 1999)					N/A	N/A	N/A	48			Graduated on June 12, 2017.
Mashiro Ui (宇井 真白) (January 31, 2000)					N/A	N/A	N/A	N/A	N/A		Graduated on March 21, 2018.
Marina Yamada (山田 麻莉奈) (March 24, 1995)					N/A	N/A	N/A	N/A	N/A		Graduated on April 20, 2018.
Mao Yamamoto (山本 茉央) (September 18, 1996)						N/A	N/A	N/A	N/A		Graduated on May 21, 2018.
Rino Sashihara (指原 莉乃) (November 21, 1992)	27	19	9	4	1	2	1	1	1		Graduated on April 28, 2019.
Haruka Kodama (兒玉 遥) (September 19, 1996)				N/A	37	21	17	9			Graduated on June 9, 2019.
Hiroka Komada (駒田 京伽) (November 21, 1996)					N/A	79	N/A	60		61	Graduated on June 17, 2019.
Natsumi Tanaka (田中 菜津美) (August 10, 2000)				N/A	N/A	N/A	N/A	89	50	63	Graduated on January 11, 2020.
Kaede Kamijima (上島 楓) (August 22, 2001)											Graduated on January 9, 2022.
Haruka Ueno (上野 遥) (September 20, 1999)					N/A	N/A	N/A	N/A	N/A	N/A	Graduated on February 26, 2022.
Meru Tashima (田島 芽瑠) (January 7, 2000)					55	38	32	43	40	26	Graduated on April 3, 2022.
Rimika Mizukami (水上 凜巳花) (July 10, 2003)											Graduated on April 3, 2022.
Nako Yabuki (矢吹 奈子) (June 18, 2001)						N/A	N/A	28	37	9	Graduated on April 1, 2023.

==== Team KIV ====
Name _{(Birthdate)}	Election										Notes
Name _{(Birthdate)}	1	2	3	4	5	6	7	8	9	10	Notes
Kanon Kimoto (木本 花音) (August 11, 1997)			N/A	56	31	50	48	68	88		Concurrent position canceled with HKT48 on March 26, 2015.
Manami Kusaba (草場 愛) (October 17, 1995)					N/A	N/A					Graduated on April 30, 2015.
Izumi Goto (後藤 泉) (September 27, 1997)					N/A	N/A	N/A				Graduated on October 30, 2015.
Raira Ito (伊藤 来笑) (October 31, 1998)					N/A	N/A	N/A				Graduated on February 29, 2016.
Kanna Okada (岡田 栞奈) (June 26, 1997)					N/A	N/A	42				Graduated on March 22, 2016.
Aika Ōta (多田 愛佳) (December 8, 1994)	20	22	25	52	43	42	41				Graduated on April 10, 2017.
Yuka Tanaka (田中 優香) (June 7, 2000)					N/A	N/A	N/A	N/A	N/A		Graduated on February 28, 2018.
Asuka Tomiyoshi (冨吉 明日香) (September 20, 1997)					N/A	N/A	N/A	42	38		Graduated on March 30, 2019.
Shino Iwahana (岩花 詩乃) (April 1, 2000)					N/A	N/A	N/A	N/A	N/A	N/A	Graduated on June 21, 2019.
Nao Ueki (植木 南央) (August 12, 1997)				N/A	N/A	N/A	72	58	54	81	Graduated on July 31, 2019.
Maiko Fukagawa (深川 舞子) (July 5, 1999)				N/A	N/A	N/A	N/A	N/A	91	N/A	Graduated on July 21, 2019.
Mio Tomonaga (朝長 美桜) (May 17, 1998)					59	27	21	23	35	48	Graduated on January 15, 2020.
Madoka Moriyasu (森保 まどか) (July 26, 1997)				N/A	N/A	25	43	50	31		Graduated on May 29, 2021.
Sakura Miyawaki (宮脇 咲良) (March 19, 1998)				47	26	11	7	6	4	3	Graduated on June 19, 2021.
Anna Murashige (村重 杏奈) (July 29, 1998)				N/A	N/A	67	N/A	80	100		Graduated on December 27, 2021.
Serina Kumazawa (熊沢 世莉奈) (April 17, 1997)				N/A	N/A	N/A	N/A	N/A	N/A	N/A	Graduated on April 3, 2022.
Mina Imada (今田 美奈) (March 5, 1997)				N/A	N/A	N/A	N/A	90	95	N/A	Graduated on April 4, 2022.

==== Team TII ====
Name _{(Birthdate)}	Election					Notes
Name _{(Birthdate)}	6	7	8	9	10	Notes
Riko Tsutsui (筒井 莉子) (February 22, 2000)	N/A	N/A	N/A			Graduated on May 29, 2017.
Yumi Matsuda (松田 祐実) (May 13, 2002)	N/A	N/A	N/A	N/A		Graduated on December 27, 2018.
Amane Tsukiashi (月足 天音) (October 26, 1999)				N/A	119	Graduated on March 30, 2020.
Rio Shimizu (清水 梨央) (October 11, 2003)				N/A	N/A	Graduated on December 20, 2021.

==== Kenkyuusei members ====
Name _{(Birthdate)}	Election	Notes
Name _{(Birthdate)}	10	Notes
Haruka Kudo (工藤 陽香) (April 21, 2006)	N/A	Graduated on October 12, 2020.
Sana Ogawa (小川 紗奈) (June 20, 2002)	N/A	Graduated on March 23, 2021.

=== Transferred members ===
These members were transferred from HKT48 to a different group.

=== Transferred to AKB48 ===
Name	Birth date (age)	Transferred from	Election rank						
Name	Birth date (age)	Transferred from	4	5	6	7	8	9	10
Chiyori Nakanishi (中西智代梨, Nakanishi Chiyori)	May 12, 1995 (age 31)	HKT48 Team H	N/A	N/A	N/A	N/A	91	N/A	N/A

=== Transferred to SKE48 ===
Name	Birth date (age)	Transferred from	Election rank					
Name	Birth date (age)	Transferred from	5	6	7	8	9	10
Marika Tani (谷真理佳, Tani Marika)	January 5, 1996 (age 30)	HKT48 Team KIV	N/A	N/A	23	55	66	89

== Discography ==
=== Studio albums ===
Release date	Title	Chart position		Sales (Oricon)		Billboard Japan sales
Release date	Title	Oricon Weekly Albums Chart	Billboard Japan Japan Albums	First week	Total	Billboard Japan sales
December 27, 2017	092	1	1	122,262	167,037	163,131
December 1, 2021	Outstanding (アウトスタンディング)	1	2	94,548	133,484 (Note: This figure is based Oricon monthly album ranking from December, 2021. Figure is still updating as March, 2022.)	143,311 (Note: Billboard Japan sales figures are from the top 50 only. Exact sales figures are not available as Billboard Japan does not count sales below the top 50; this figure is still updating as April 20, 2022.)

=== Singles ===
Release date	Title	Chart position		Sales (Oricon)		Billboard Japan sales	Album
Release date	Title	Oricon Weekly Singles Chart	Billboard Japan Hot 100	First week	Total	Billboard Japan sales	Album
March 20, 2013	"Suki! Suki! Skip!" (スキ！スキ！スキップ！; "Liked! Liked! Skip!")	1	2	250,147	291,876		092
September 4, 2013	"Melon Juice" (メロンジュース)	1	1	268,897	306,014		092
March 12, 2014	"Sakura, Minnade Tabeta" (桜、みんなで食べた; "We Ate Sakura Together")	1	1	276,799	331,015		092
September 24, 2014	"Hikaeme I Love You!" (控えめI love you!; "Quietly I Love You")	1	1	277,534	318,533		092
April 22, 2015	"12 Byō" (12秒; "12 Seconds")	1	3	277,916	337,237		092
November 25, 2015	"Shekarashika!" (しぇからしか!; "Too Noisy!")	1	3	280,567	345,413		092
April 13, 2016	"74 Okubun no 1 no Kimi e" (74億分の1の君へ; "7.4 Billion Parts to You")	1	1	238,828	305,137	379,439	092
September 7, 2016	"Saikō Kayo" (最高かよ; "It's great")	1	1	269,907	345,267	427,908	092
February 15, 2017	"Bagutte Iijan" (バグっていいじゃん)	1	1	210,070	274,545	404,163	092
August 2, 2017	"Kiss wa Matsushikanai no Deshōka?" (キスを待つしかないのでしょうか？)	1	1	199,504	260,757	376,374	092
May 2, 2018	"Hayaokuri Calendar" (早送りカレンダー)	1	1	165,176	272,811	296,470	Outstanding
April 10, 2019	"Ishi" (意志)	1	1	197,846	298,427	367,963	Outstanding
April 22, 2020	"3-2"	1	1	161,785	196,146	196,610	Outstanding
May 12, 2021	"Kimi to Doko ka e Ikitai" (君とどこかへ行きたい)	2		141,792	162,527	233,264	Outstanding
June 22, 2022	"Biisan wa Naze Naku Naru no ka?" (ビーサンはなぜなくなるのか?)	1	3	127,375		280,736	
February 8, 2023	"Kimi wa Motto Dekiru" (君はもっとできる)	2	4	128,591	TBA	289,456	
December 20, 2023	"Baketsu wo Kabure!" (バケツを被れ！)	2	5	121,607	TBA	242,622	
September 11, 2024	"Boku wa Yatto Kimi o Shinpai Dekiru" (僕はやっと君を心配できる)	3	5	95,053	TBA	314,523	
July 23, 2025	"Hansode Tenshi" (半袖天使)	3	6	81,691	TBA		

=== Songs recorded on AKB48 singles ===
Release date	Title of HKT48 song	Title of AKB48 single which HKT48 song is recorded on
December 5, 2012	"Hatsukoi Butterfly" (初恋バタフライ; "First-love Butterfly")	Eien Pressure
December 11, 2013	"Wink wa 3-kai" (ウインクは3回; "Winks 3 times")	"Suzukake no Ki no Michi de ..."
March 4, 2015	"Otona Ressha" (大人列車; "Train to Adulthood")	"Green Flash"
March 9, 2016	"Make Noise" (メイクノイズ)	"Kimi wa Melody"
March 15, 2017	"Tomaranai Kanransha" (止まらない観覧車)	"Shoot Sign"

== Filmography ==
=== Television shows ===
- HKT48 no Odekake! (TBS, 2013–2017)
- Majisuka Gakuen 0 Kisarazu Rantō Hen (NTV and Hulu Japan, November 28, 2015)
- HKT48 vs NGT48 Sashikita Gassen (NTV and Hulu Japan, January 12 – March 29, 2016)
- HKT Variety 48 (2012-2019)

=== Films ===
- Ozaki Shihainin ga Naita Yoru Documentary of HKT48 (2015)
