= Meru Tashima =

Japanese singer (born 2000)

Meru Tashima 田島 芽瑠
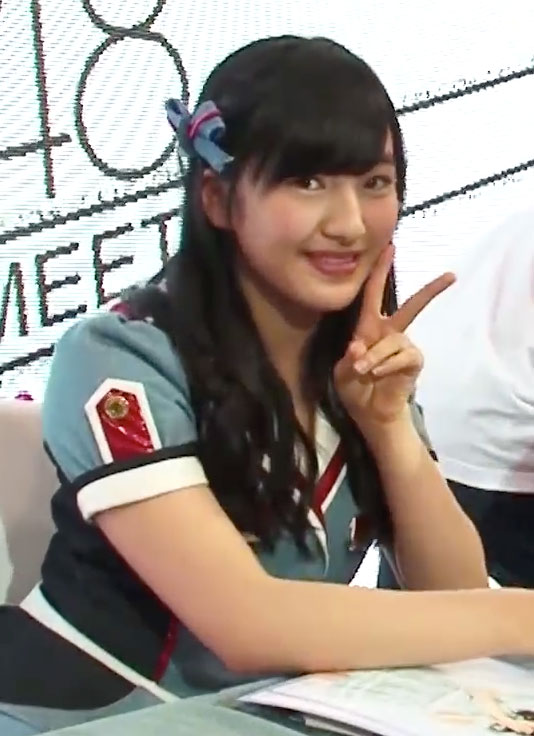

Background information
- Born: 7 January 2000 (age 25)
- Origin: Fukuoka Prefecture, Japan
- Genres: J-pop
- Occupation: Singer
- Years active: 2012–present
- Labels: Universal Music Japan

Meru Tashima (田島 芽瑠, Tashima Meru, born January 7, 2000 in Fukuoka Prefecture) is a Japanese singer and idol. She is a former member of the idol group HKT48.

== Biography ==
In 2011, Tashima took part in the 10th generation auditions for the idol group Morning Musume. She passed 3 rounds and advanced to the final, but was not chosen to join the group.

In 2012, the idol group HKT48 held its 2nd generation audition. Tashima participated and passed. She was added to the group as trainee member along with 33 other winners of the audition. She became soon a hot topic throughout Japan, after it was reported that AKB48 and HKT48 producer Yasushi Akimoto commented on her as being "the new Jurina Matsui", a member who joined AKB48's sister group SKE48 at the age of 11 and was immediately appointed one of the front positions in the next AKB48 single and featured on its cover art. Thus she became one of the most prominent members of the project in a matter of months.

Another surprise came when Tashima, in spite of officially being a trainee member, was appointed the central position in her band's first original song "Hatsukoi Butterfly", to be released as a B-side on the 29th single by AKB48.

In February 2013 it was announced that HKT48 will release its debut single, titled "Suki! Suki! Skip!", and that Tashima, again, was going to hold the central position in the title song.

In HKT48's second single "Melon Juice", Meru Tashima was again featured in a central position. This time there were two "centers", her and Mio Tomonaga.

In November 2019, Tashima acted in Battles Without Honor and Humanity: On'na-tachi no Shitō-hen, a stage adaptation of the Battles Without Honor and Humanity yakuza film series. She played the role of Yoshio Yamamori, based on Nobuo Kaneko's original portrayal.

On January 15, 2022, Tashima announced her graduation from HKT48. Her graduation performance is scheduled for March 14, then she will officially graduate from the group on April 3.

== Filmography ==
=== Television ===
- Joshikō Keisatsu (女子高警察) (drama, Fuji TV, October 27, 2013 – March 16, 2014)
- Fukuoka Ren'ai Hakusho — 9 Tsuki to Taiyō o Miagete (福岡恋愛白書9 月と太陽を見上げて) (drama, Kyushu Asahi Broadcasting, March 21, 2014)
- Majisuka Gakuen 0: Kisarazu Rantōhen (マジすか学園0 木更津乱闘編) as Megaphone (drama, Nippon Television, November 28, 2015)
- AKB Love Night: Love Factory (AKBラブナイト 恋工場) Ep.4 – First Boyfriend, as Ema Hoshina (drama, TV Asahi, April 27, 2016)

=== Stage ===
- Battles Without Honor and Humanity: On'na-tachi no Shitō-hen (2019)

=== Film ===
- Sengoku Girl and Kendō Boy (2020)
- Teppen no Ken (2024)

=== Anime ===
- Armor Shop for Ladies & Gentlemen (2021)
