= Aika Ota =

Japanese entertainer (born 1994)

Aika Yamaguchi
- 山口 愛佳
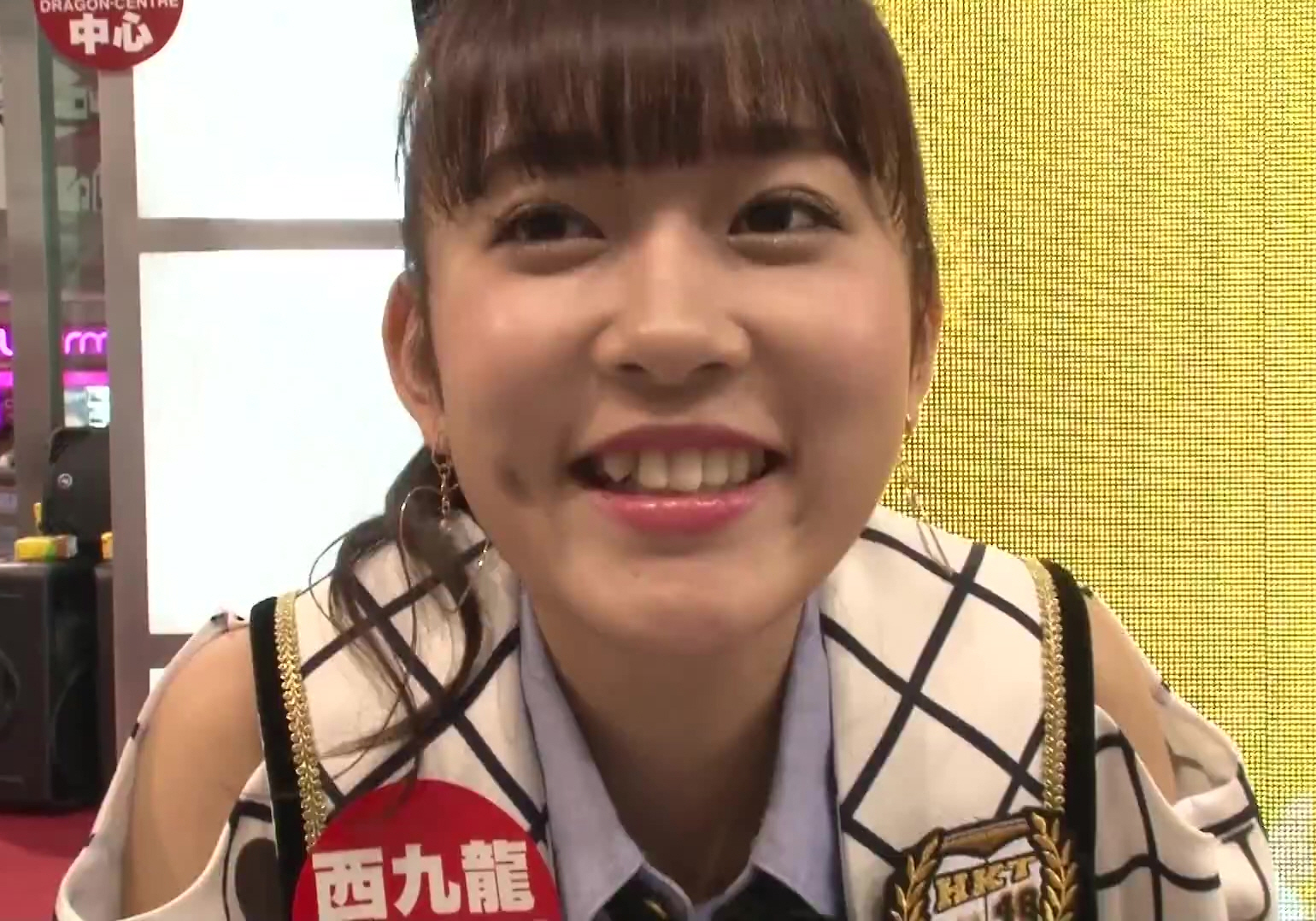
- Born: Aika Ota (多田 愛佳); 8 December 1994 (age 31); Saitama Prefecture, Japan
- Spouse: Koki Yamaguchi (m. 2023)
- Children: 1
- Musical career
- Genres: J-pop
- Years active: 2007–present
- Label: DefSTAR Records

Aika Ota (多田 愛佳, Ōta Aika; born December 8, 1994 in Saitama Prefecture), is a former member of the Japanese idol group HKT48, the captain of its Team KIV. She has also been a member of AKB48 and Watarirouka Hashiritai, and portrayed Kazue Kae in Tomie Unlimited (2011).

== Career ==
=== 2006ー2012: AKB48 and Watarirouka Hashiritai ===
Ota joined AKB48 as part of Original Team B, also known as 3rd Generation, along with her teammates Kashiwagi Yuki and Watanabe Mayu. Team B made its debut in April 2007 and Ota was one of the other Team B members to debuted in AKB48 Theater. Later, she became senbatsu for the first time in Sakura no Hanabiratachi 2008. In October 2008, Akimoto Yasushi announced the creation of Watarirouka Hashiritai. Before Watarirouka Hashiritai debuted and Natsumi Hirajima was added, It was known as "Okashina Sisters" (お菓子なシスターズ) which consisting her, Nakagawa Haruka and Mayuyu, According to Akimoto Yasushi, The name Okashina Sisters is a pun on okashi (お菓子), meaning "sweets", and okashii na (可笑しいな), meaning "amusing" or "strange" and Watarirouka Hashiritai officially debuted in January 2009, releasing their 1st Single and double single "Hatsukoi Dash/Aoi Mirai". In AKB48 13th Single Senbatsu Sousenkyo, Ota ranked 20th in final results and joined senbatsu for Iiwake Maybe, released on 26 August. On 23 August 2009, during AKB48 Bunshin no Jutsu Tour / AKB104 Senbatsu Members Sokaku Matsuri (AKB48 分身の術ツアー/AKB104選抜メンバー組閣祭り), It was announced that she was transferred from Team B to Team A though it did not take effect officially until May 2010. In AKB48 17th Single Senbatsu Election, Ota ranked 22nd Place and became center of Undergirls. In AKB48 22nd Single Senbatsu Sousenkyo ～Kotoshi mo Gachi desu～ (AKB48 22ndシングル選抜総選挙 ～今年もガチです～), She ranked 25th Place and remained Undergirls. In AKB48 27th Single Senbatsu Sousenkyo, She Came into 52nd place with 6,140 votes and became Future Girls.

=== 2012-2017: Moved to HKT48 ===
When AKB48 held a concert in Tokyo Dome, on the 1st Day of concert, Tomonobu Togasaki announced its second shuffle and Ota was permanently transferred to HKT48. She had her last activity with AKB48 in 29 October before moving to HKT48. She officially debuted with HKT48 in November 2012 and was promoted to Team H. In AKB48 32nd Single Senbatsu Sousenkyo, Ota ranked 43rd place with 16,401 votes and became Next Girls, On 11 January 2014, when HKT48 held their concert "HKT48 Kyushu 7 Prefecture Tour ~Kawaii Ko ni wa Tabi wo Saseyo~", Ota was transferred to newly formed Team KIV and appointed captain. Meanwhile, Watarirouka Hashiritai held their final concert on 9 February 2014. In AKB48 37th Single Senbatsu Sousenkyo, she remained her position in Next Girls, ranking 42nd with 18,143 votes. In AKB48 41st Single Senbatsu Sousenkyo, in her last participation as a candidate, Ota ranked 41st place with 19,921 votes. She has not participate in 45th Single Senbatsu Sousenkyo in 2016 and 49th Single Senbatsu Sousenkyo in 2017 (since she graduated from HKT48 in April 2017).

=== 2017: Graduating from HKT48 ===
On 17 January 2017, Ota announced her graduation from HKT48 and HKT48 held a concert entitled "HKT48 Spring Kanto Tour 2017 ~We will show you true idols~ (HKT48 春の関東ツアー2017 ～本気のアイドルを見せてやる～)". the Saitama concert in noontime served as her graduation concert from the group and officially graduated on 10 April 2017.

== Personal life ==
On November 20, 2023, Ota announced her marriage to Chiba Lotte Marines baseball player Koki Yamaguchi. On October 5, 2024, she gave birth to her first child, a baby girl.

== Appearances ==
=== Stage units ===
- "Ame no Dobutsuen" (「雨の動物園」) (Team B 1st Stage)
- "Nageki no Figure" (「嘆きのフィギュア」) (Team B 2nd Stage)
- "Garasu no I Love You" (「ガラスのI LOVE YOU」) (Team B 2nd Stage)
- "Senaka Kara Dakishimete" (「背中から抱きしめて」) (Team B 2nd Stage)
- "Rio no Kakumei" (「リオの革命」) (Team B 2nd Stage)
