= Anna Murashige =

Japanese-Russian media personality and idol

- 村重 杏奈
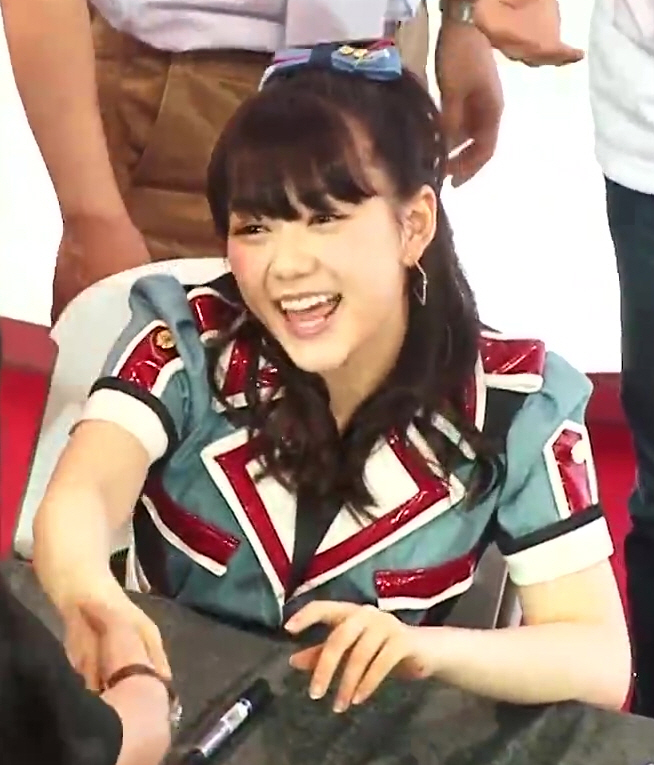
- Murashige in May 2015
- Born: 29 July 1998 (age 28); Yamaguchi Prefecture, Japan
- Other name: あーにゃ (A'nya)
- Occupations: Media personality; actress; singer
- Years active: 2011–present
- Agent: Twin Planet
- Musical career
- Genres: J-pop
- Instrument: Vocals
- Years active: 2011–present
- Formerly of: HKT48; NMB48

Anna Murashige (Note: Russian: Анна Мурашиге; Japanese: あーにゃ) (村重 杏奈, Murashige An'na; born July 29, 1998) is a Japanese-Russian media personality, actress, and former singer. She is represented by Twin Planet and came to prominence as a member of the idol groups HKT48 and NMB48.

== Early life ==
Anna Murashige was born in Yamaguchi Prefecture on July 29, 1998, the daughter of a Russian mother and Japanese father. Her mother arrived in Japan to look for work after the dissolution of the Soviet Union. Murashige has two younger sisters and a younger brother; her sisters, Maria and Erika, are both actresses represented by Watanabe Entertainment.

== Career ==
Before becoming an idol, Murashige attended Actor's School Hiroshima. On July 10, 2011, she passed the first generation audition for HKT48. She was unveiled along with other HKT48 members on October 23. On November 26, she debuted at the HKT48 Theater. Her catchphrase is in Russian: Всем привет. Я вас очень-очень люблю., romanized: Vsem privyet. Ya vas ochen' ochen' lyublyu. ("Hello to everyone. I love all of you very, very much.")

On March 4, 2012, when HKT48's Team H was formed, she was selected as one of its 16 members. On August 17, 2012, she appeared in the television drama Majisuka Gakuen 3, the only HKT48 member to do so. In June 2014, she placed 67th in the AKB48 auditions. On September 19, 2021, she announced her graduation from HKT48, which took place on December 27.

== Personal life ==
Murashige, who has relatives in Russia and friends in Ukraine, spoke out publicly against the 2022 Russian invasion of Ukraine.

== Filmography ==
Year	Title	Role	Notes	Ref.
2025	Demon Virus			
