= Dessert (disambiguation) =

Dessert is a course that concludes a meal.

Dessert may also refer to:

== Arts, entertainment, and media ==
- Dessert (album), a 2007 album by Chocolove
- Dessert (magazine), a Japanese manga magazine published by Kodansha
- "Dessert" (song), a 2015 song by Dawin
- "Dessert" a 2022 song by Kim Yo-han
- Desserts (film), a 1998 short film

== Foods and beverages ==
- Dessert wine, a sweet wine typically served with dessert

== See also ==
- Just deserts (disambiguation)
- Just desserts (disambiguation)
