= Anna Iriyama =

Japanese model, actress, YouTuber and businessperson (born 1995)

- 入山 杏奈
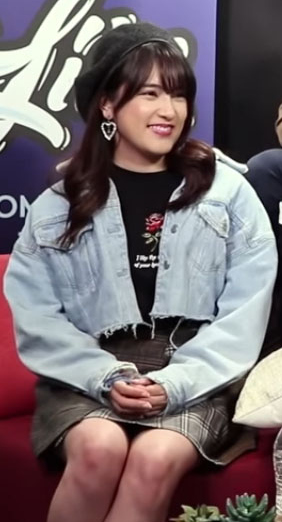
- Iriyama in October 2018
- Born: December 3, 1995 (age 30); Chiba Prefecture, Japan
- Occupations: model; YouTuber; businessperson
- Years active: 2010–present
- Agent: Ohta Production

YouTube information
- Channels: Anna Iriyama; Official Annin Channel
- Years active: 2019–present (Anna Iriyama); 2022–present (Official)
- Genre: Tourism
- Subscribers: 234,000; 6,810
- Views: 11,231,943; 196,368
- Musical career
- Genres: J-pop
- Instrument: Vocals
- Years active: 2010–2022
- Label: Avex Trax (AnRiRe)
- Formerly of: AKB48, AnRiRe
- Last updated: 21 March 2023
- Website: Official website

Anna Iriyama (入山 杏奈, Iriyama Anna; born December 3, 1995) is a Japanese model, actress, YouTuber and businessperson. She is a former member of the Japanese idol group AKB48, in which she was a member of Team A. She is represented by the talent agency Ohta Production. She was part of the cast for the telenovela Like and lived in Mexico from 2018 to 2019.

== Career ==
=== AKB48 ===
Iriyama started her career in the entertainment industry when in March 2010 she passed the 10th generation audition for the trainee section of the girl group AKB48. She debuted with AKB48 in June of the same year when she started performing in the AKB48 Theater.

She participated in that year's AKB48 general elections, but did not rank. In July 2011, she was promoted to AKB48's Team 4, thus becoming a full member of AKB48.

On December 17, 2011, Iriyama and two other AKB48 members, Ami Maeda and Rena Katō, held a large autograph-signing event in Hong Kong. The venue was packed with 6,000 people.

In 2012, on the AKB48 single "Manatsu no Sounds Good!", Iriyama made her first senbatsu appearance (meaning that she was selected to participate on the A-side of an AKB48 single for the first time). Despite that, she again did not rank in the AKB48 general elections for the year.

In September, together with Rina Kawaei and Rena Kato, she became a member of an AKB48 subgroup named Anrire. On October 17, 2012, the subgroup released a single titled "Ikujinashi Masquerade" together with Rino Sashihara, which charted at number one in the Japanese Oricon weekly singles chart.

In April 2013, Iriyama scored the highest in a general knowledge test called Mechaike AKB Kimatsu Test, held by the television show Mecha-Mecha Iketeru!. In the AKB48 election held in the same year, she ranked in the 30th place.

In AKB48's general elections for 2014, she placed 77th place on the first day, and eventually finished 20th overall, with 34,002 votes.

In AKB48's general elections for 2016, she placed 18th with 36,894 votes. It is the highest position for her at the time. Iriyama released her first solo photobook, Utsukushii Tsumi (美しい罪; The Beautiful Sin), on March 22, 2017.

On January 4, 2022, during a New Year's livestream on her YouTube channel, Iriyama announced her graduation from AKB48. Her last theater performance took place on March 16 and final activity with them was on the following day, March 17.

==== Attack ====
On May 25, 2014, during an event held at the Iwate Industry Culture & Convention Center in Takizawa, Iwate, she, along with AKB48 member Rina Kawaei and a staff member were attacked by a 24-year-old man wielding a handsaw. She and Kawaei suffered bone fractures and lacerations to their hands (Iriyama's right little finger and Kawaei's right thumb were fractured and cut, Iriyama also suffered cuts to her head) and were taken to the hospital for surgery. The event, as well as all other group activities on that day, were halted.

=== Acting career ===
In 2014, Iriyama played her first starring (main cast) TV drama role, in the series Kekkon Sasete Kudasai!! Episode 3 "Ai no Tomato" scheduled to broadcast from May 26 to 30.

In April, it was reported that Iriyama would soon make her debut in cinema, with the film Ao Oni. The movie is based on the horror game of the same name and will be released nationwide in Japan on July 5.

In March 2018, it was announced that Iriyama would join the cast of a Mexican telenovela titled Like La Leyenda. Her character, Keiko Kobayashi, is a Japanese girl with a mysterious past who came to Mexico to attend the titular school and does not speak English or Spanish. Her last appearance before leaving for Mexico was on April 1 at Saitama Super Arena, and she would be living there for about a year.

After graduating from AKB48, Iriyama continues to work in the entertainment industry as an actress in her home country Japan, with sporadic visits to Mexico.

=== YouTube ===
On April 11, 2019, Iriyama launched her YouTube channel, focusing her initial videos on travel throughout Mexico, speaking Spanish in them with Japanese subtitles. Her first video, "¿QUIÉN ES ANNA?" (杏奈って誰?; "Who is Anna?"), is her introduction, as seen from the point of view of fans as well as Like, La Leyenda actors, staff and director.

On July 30, 2022, Iriyama launched her Japanese-language YouTube channel, "Anna Iriyama Official Annin Channel" (入山杏奈official あんにんチャンネル), with her first video there being of her talking about her career from her time in AKB48 to today.

== Private life ==
On February 5, Iriyama announced that she passed the B1 level of the DELE Spanish proficiency test.

== Discography ==
=== Singles with AKB48 ===
Year	No.	Title	Role	Notes
2010	19	"Chance no Junban"	B-side	First appearance on an AKB48 single. Did not sing on title track; lineup was determined by rock-paper-scissors tournament. Sang on "Fruits Snow" as Team Kenkyūsei.
2011	20	"Sakura no Ki ni Narō"	B-side	Sang on "Ōgon Center" as Team Kenkyūsei
2011	21	"Everyday, Katyusha"	B-side	Sang on "Anti" as Team Kenkyūsei
2011	23	"Kaze wa Fuiteiru"	Under Girls	Sang on "Kimi no Senaka" as Under Girls and "Tsubomitachi" as Team 4+Kenkyūsei
2011	24	"Ue kara Mariko"	B-side	Did not sing on title track; lineup was determined by rock-paper-scissors tournament; Sang on "Hashire! Penguin" as part of Team 4
2012	25	"Give Me Five!"	B-side (Special Girls A)	Sang on "New Ship" as part of Special Girls A.
2012	26	"Manatsu no Sounds Good!"	A-side	First A-side of an AKB48 single.
2012	27	"Gingham Check"	Waiting Girls	Did not place in top 64 in 2012 General Election. Sang "Ano Hi no Fūrin" as part of Waiting Girls.
2012	28	"Uza"	Under Girls	Sang on "Tsugi no Season" as Under Girls, and on "Kodoku na Hoshizora" as New Team A
2012	29	"Eien Pressure"	B-side	Did not sing on title track; lineup was determined by rock-paper-scissors tournament. Sang on "Eien Yori Tsuzuku Yō ni" as part of OKL48
2013	30	"So Long!"	Under Girls	Sang on "Ruby" as Team A. Sang on "Waiting Room" as Under Girls.
2013	31	"Sayonara Crawl"	A-side	Also sang on "Ikiru Koto"
2013	32	"Koi Suru Fortune Cookie"	Under Girls	Ranked 30th in 2013 General Election. Sang on "Ai no Imi wo Kanagaete Mita" as Under Girls.
2013	33	"Heart Electric"	A-side	Sang on title track with English name Veronica.
2013	34	"Suzukake no Ki no Michi de "Kimi no Hohoemi o Yume ni Miru" to Itte Shimattara Bokutachi no Kankei wa Dō Kawatte Shimau no ka, Bokunari ni Nan-nichi ka Kangaeta Ue de no Yaya Kihazukashii Ketsuron no Yō na Mono"	B-side	Did not sing on title track; lineup was determined by rock-paper-scissors tournament. Sang on "Mosh & Dive".
2014	36	"Labrador Retriever"	A-side	Also sang on "Kimi wa Kimagure"
2014	37	"Kokoro no Placard"	B-side	Sang on "Dareka ga Nageta Ball". Ranked #20 in AKB48 6th General Elections.
2014	38	"Kibouteki Refrain"	A-side	Also sang on "Juujun na Slave"
2015	39	"Green Flash"	A-side	Also sang "Haru no Hikari Chikadzuita Natsu"
2015	40	"Bokutachi wa Tatakawanai"	B-side	Did not sing on title track; Sang "Kimi ni Dai-Ni Shō".
2015	41	"Halloween Night"	B-side	Did not sing on title track; Did not participate in 2015 General Election. Sang "Yankee Machine Gun".
2015	42	"Kuchibiru ni Be My Baby"	A-side	Also sang "365 Nichi no Kamihikōki", "Yasashii Place", "Madonna no Sentaku" and "Senaka Kotoba".
2016	43	"Kimi wa Melody"	A-side	Marked as the 10th Anniversary Single. Also sang "LALALA Message", "Mazariau Mono" as NogizakaAKB and "M.T ni Sasagu" as Team A.
2016	44	"Tsubasa wa Iranai"	A-side	Also sang "Set me free" as Team A.
2016	45	"LOVE TRIP / Shiawase wo Wakenasai"	A-side	Also sang on "Hikari to Kage no Hibi", "Densetsu no Sakana" as Under Girls and "Black Flower".
2016	46	"High Tension"	A-side	
2017	47	"Shoot Sign"	A-side	
2017	48	"Negaigoto no Mochigusare"	A-side	
2017	51	"Jabaja"	A-side	
2018	52	"Teacher Teacher"	B-side	Did not sing on title track; sang on "Kimi wa Boku no Kaze" as Center Exam Senbatsu and "Romantic Junbichuu" as Team A.
2020	58	"Nemohamo Rumor"	B-side	Last appearance on an AKB48 single. Did not sing on title track; sang on "Black Jaguar" as First Generation.

=== Singles with Anrire ===
- "Ikujinashi Masquerade" (2012) – Rino Sashihara feat. Anrire

== Filmography ==
=== Music videos ===
Year	Title	Director	Notes
2012	"Ikujinashi Masquerade" (Kawaei Rina Center ver.)		

=== TV dramas ===
- Majisuka Gakuen 2 (2011) as Anna
- Majisuka Gakuen 3 (2012) as Annin
- Majisuka Gakuen 4 (2015) as Yoga
- Majisuka Gakuen 5 (2015) as Yoga
- AKB Horror Night: Adrenaline's Night Ep.11 - Fax (2015) as Tomomi
- AKB Love Night: Love Factory Ep.3 - Love of Rain Sound (2016) as Takane
- Crow's Blood (2016) as Aoi Nojiri
- Cabasuka Gakuen (2016) Ep.8 as Yoga/Iruka
- Like (2018) Televisa as Keiko Kobayashi (Mexican TV Series)
- Iine! Hikaru Genji-kun (2020)
- Sennyu Kyodai: Tokushu Sagi Tokumei Sosakan (2024) as Minami Takatsu
- Captured Broadcasting Station (2025) as Minami Takatsu
- Super Space Sheriff Gavan Infinity (2026) as Rui Amo, Seoritsu
- Kakusei Hunter Omegahorn (2026) Ep.2 as Rui Amo

=== Movies ===
- Ao Oni (2014)
- Under One Umbrella (2018)

== Bibliography ==
=== Solo photobooks ===
#	title	Release date	Chart position	Publisher
#	title	Release date	JP Oricon PB	Publisher
1	Iriyama Anna Fāsuto shashin-shū Utsukushii Tsumi (入山杏奈ファースト写真集 美しい罪; Anna Iriyama's First Photobook: The Beautiful Sin)	March 22, 2017	1	Gentosha
