= Dessert (album) =

Studio album by Chocolove from AKB48
- Released: November 21, 2007 (JP)
- Recorded: 2007
- Genres: J-pop, dance, electronica
- Label: Universal Music Japan

Singles from Dessert
- 1. "Ashita wa Ashita no Kimi ga Umareru" Released: June 6, 2007; 2. "Mail no Namida" Released: August 29, 2007

Dessert (pronounced in English) is the first and only studio album of the Japanese idol girl group Chocolove from AKB48. The album was released on November 21, 2007, available in two editions: a limited edition containing a 24-page photobook and a regular edition.

== Information ==
The album peaked at the 99th place in the Oricon rankings, where it remained for one week. The album sold 2 383 copies, which included two singles (and their B-sides): Ashita wa Ashita no Kimi ga Umareru and Mail no Namida. The B-side singles are versions performed by solo singers, like Chocolate (Ashita wa Ashita no Kimi ga Umareru B-side) and Kare no Kitchen (B-side Mail no Namida).

== Track listing ==
All tracks were written by Yasushi Akimoto.

No.	Title	Music	Arrangement	Length
1.	"Ashita wa Ashita no Kimi ga Umareru" (明日は明日の君が生まれる)	Miki Fujisue	Shinya Saitō	4:23
2.	"Chocolate (rina-solo)"	Manabu Tsuchiya	Gary Newby	3:26
3.	"Chocolate (sae-solo)"	Tsuchiya	Newby	3:26
4.	"Chocolate (sayaka-solo)"	Tsuchiya	Newby	3:26
5.	"Mail no Namida" (メールの涙)	Ichirō Fujiya	IPPEI	4:59
6.	"Kare no Kitchen (rina-solo)" (彼のキッチン (rina-solo))	Hiroyuki Suzuki	Suzuki	4:23
7.	"Kare no Kitchen (sae-solo)" (彼のキッチン (sae-solo))	Suzuki	Suzuki	4:22
8.	"Kare no Kitchen (sayaka-solo)" (彼のキッチン (sayaka-solo))	Suzuki	Suzuki	4:22
9.	"Waves"	Tomotaka Ōsumi	IPPEI	4:27
10.	"Waves (rina-solo)"	Ōsumi	IPPEI	4:27
11.	"Waves (sae-solo)"	Ōsumi	IPPEI	4:27
12.	"Waves (sayaka-solo)"	Ōsumi	IPPEI	4:27
