= Furuhata =

Furuhata (written: 古畑 or 降旗) is a Japanese surname. Notable people with the surname include:

- Koji Furuhata (born 1933), Japanese actor
- Nao Furuhata (古畑 奈和; born 1996), Japanese idol and singer
- Seika Furuhata (古畑 星夏; born 1996), Japanese model and actress
- Yasuo Furuhata (降旗 康男; 1934–2019), Japanese film director
