= Ultraman Decker Finale: Journey to Beyond =

- Promotional English poster

Japanese name
- Kanji: ウルトラマンデッカー最終章 旅立ちの彼方へ…
Transcriptions
- Revised Hepburn: Urutoraman Dekkā Saishūshō Tabidachi no Kanata e...
- Directed by: Masayoshi Takesue
- Screenplay by: Toshizo Nemoto
- Based on: Ultraman Decker by Masayoshi Takesue
- Produced by: Tsugumi Kitaura
- Starring: Hiroki Matsumoto; Yuka Murayama; Nobunaga Daichi; Sae Miyazawa; Masaya Kikawada; Kayano Nakamura
- Cinematography: Satoshi Murakawa
- Edited by: Yosuke Yafune
- Music by: Kenichiro Suehiro; Masahiro Tokuda
- Production company: Tsuburaya Productions
- Distributed by: Tsuburaya Productions
- Release date: February 23, 2023
- Running time: 75 mins
- Country: Japan
- Language: Japanese

Ultraman Decker Finale: Journey to Beyond (ウルトラマンデッカー最終章 旅立ちの彼方へ…, Urutoraman Dekkā Saishūshō Tabidachi no Kanata e...) is 2023 Japanese superhero kaiju tokusatsu film, serving as the conclusion to the 2022-23 Ultra Series television series Ultraman Decker. The fourth theatrical Ultraman film in the Reiwa era, it tells the story of the struggling fight of GUTS-Select with evil Professor Gibellus, while a mysterious woman, who can transform into Ultraman Dinas, appears to help them.

The film was released both theatrically and on the streaming services on February 23, 2023.

== Plot ==
When a mysterious sound causes several disappearances, GUTS-Select decide to investigate the unexplained incidents. However, they soon learn it is the work of evil Professor Gibellus, who intends to invade the Earth with his alien army. Fortunately, a mysterious woman with a power of Ultraman appears just in time to help worried members of GUTS-Select.

The movie then ends with a post-credit scene that teases the new Ultraman, Blazar.

== Production ==
The movie is directed by Masayoshi Takesue, who also was the director of Ultraman Decker, Ultraman Trigger: Episode Z and several episodes of Ultraman Trigger: New Generation Tiga, while Toshizo Nemoto who also participated in the mentioned works was the movie's writer. The film's theme song, "Sora no Kanata e", was performed by Hironobu Kageyama.

=== Release ===
In Japan, the film was released in theaters and on Tsuburaya Imagination simultaneously on February 23, 2023. The exclusive message from HANE2 and the show's 10 minutes long recap was shown in theaters before the movie's screening.

Worldwide, except for Japan and China, it was available to stream on Ultraman Connection the same day.

=== Marketing ===
Ultraman Decker Finale: Journey to Beyond was first announced on November 26, 2022, with the first trailer releasing the same day. The same day, Japanese and English promotional posters were show. The second trailer was released on January 21, 2023, while name of the mysterious new Ultraman who is set to appear in the film was revealed to be Ultraman Dinas.

== Cast ==
- Kanata Asumi (アスミ カナタ, Asumi Kanata)/Ultraman Decker (ウルトラマンデッカー, Urutoraman Dekkā; Voice): Hiroki Matsumoto (松本 大輝, Matsumoto Hiroki)
- Ichika Kirino (キリノ イチカ, Kirino Ichika): Yuka Murayama (村山 優香, Murayama Yūka)
- Soma Ryumon (リュウモン ソウマ, Ryūmon Sōma): Nobunaga Daichi (大地 伸永, Daichi Nobunaga)
- Sawa Kaizaki (カイザキ サワ, Kaizaki Sawa): Sae Miyazawa (宮澤 佐江, Miyazawa Sae)
- Taiji Murahoshi (ムラホシ タイジ, Murahoshi Taiji): Masaya Kikawada (黄川田 雅哉, Kikawada Masaya)
- Dinas (ディナス, Dinasu)/Ultraman Dinas (ウルトラマンディナス, Urutoraman Dinasu; Voice): Kayano Nakamura (中村 加弥乃, Nakamura Kayano)
- Sato (サトウ, Satō): Koichiro Nagayoshi (永吉 幸一郎, Nagayoshi Kōichirō)
- Nojima (ノジマ): Kaoru Nishiuchi (西内 薫, Nishiuchi Kaoru)
- Isozaki (イソザキ): Mikitaka (樹隆)
- HANE2 (Voice): Hiroshi Tsuchida (土田 大, Tsuchida Hiroshi)
- Alien Icarus (イカルス星人, Ikarusu Seijin; Voice): Tomokazu Seki (関 智一, Seki Tomokazu)
- Professor Gibellus (プロフェッサー・ギベルス, Purofessā Giberusu; Voice): Ryūsei Nakao (中尾 隆聖, Nakao Ryūsei)
- Alien Pedan (ペダン星人, Pedan Seijin; Voice): Danchō Yasuda (団長安田)
- Alien Ckalutch (クカラッチ星人, Kukaratchi Seijin; Voice): HIRO
- Alien Zelan (ゼラン星人, Zeran Seijin; Voice): Kuro-chan (クロちゃん)
- Galmess (ガルメス人, Garumesu-jin; Voice): Yoshihisa Arai (荒井 義久, Arai Yoshihisa)
- Alien Shaplay (シャプレー星人, Shapurē Seijin; Voice): Akira Hongo (本郷 章, Hongō Akira)
- Alien Bado (バド星人, Bado Seijin; Voice): Iori Yonahara (よなはら 伊織, Yonahara Iori)
- Grace (グレース, Gurēsu; Voice): Koji Nakamura (中村 浩二, Nakamura Kōji)
- Nigel (ナイゲル, Naigeru; Voice): Yūko Kaida (甲斐田 裕子, Kaida Yūko)

== Theme song ==
- "Sora no Kanata e" (ソラノカナタヘ; "Beyond the Sky")
  - Arrangement: NANA KAGEYAMA
  - Lyrics, Composition, & Artist: Hironobu Kageyama (影山 ヒロノブ, Kageyama Hironobu)
