= Rena Kato =

Japanese tarento, former AKB48 member (born 1997)

- 加藤 玲奈
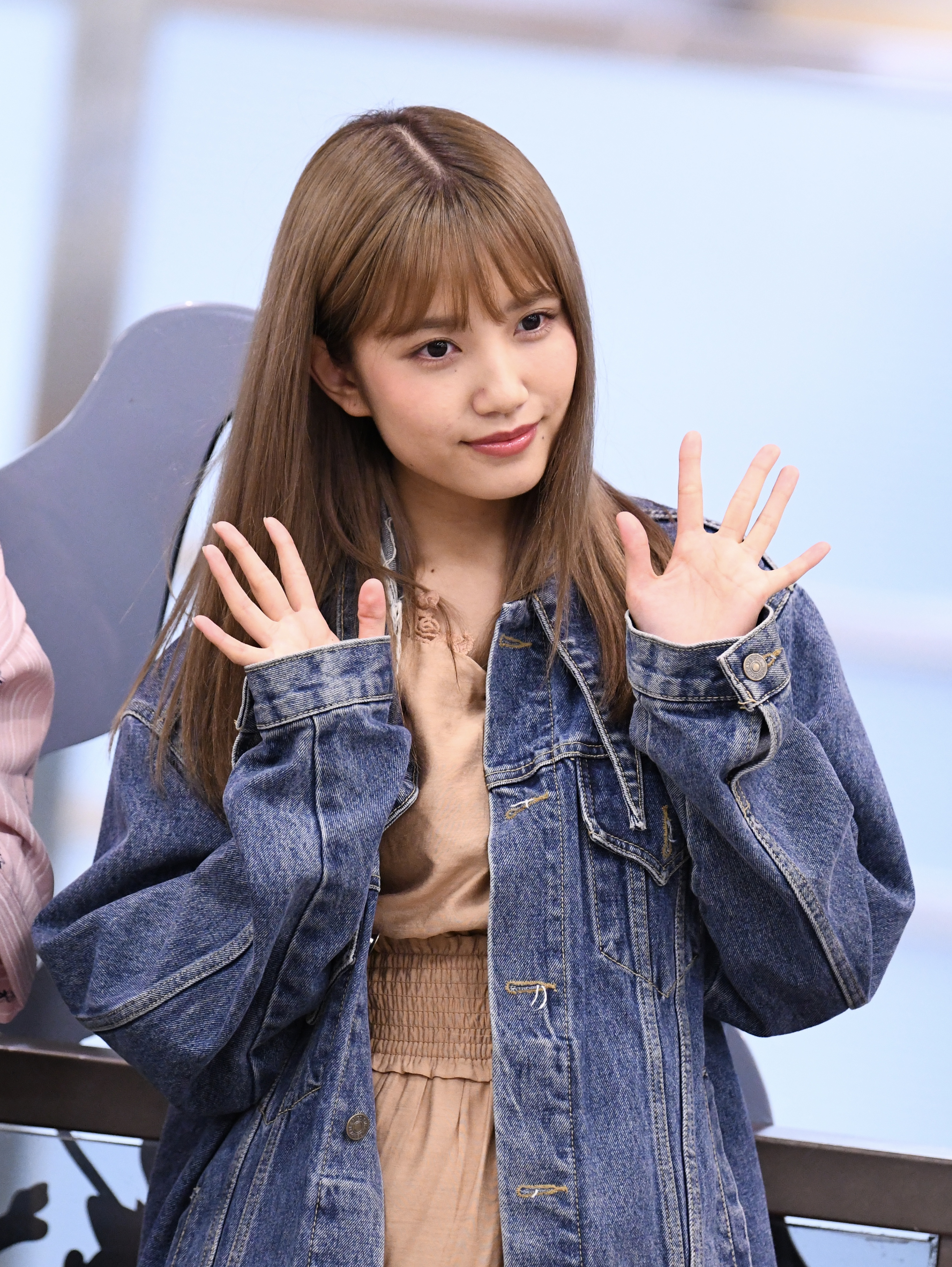
- Kato Rena in 2019
- Born: July 10, 1997 (age 29); Chiba Prefecture, Japan
- Other name: Renacchi (れなっち)
- Occupations: Hairdresser, makeup artist Idol, tarento, actress (formerly)
- Years active: 2010–present
- Height: 161 cm (5 ft 3 in)
- Spouse: unknown (m. 2025)
- Musical career
- Genres: J-pop
- Instrument: Vocals
- Years active: 2010–2022
- Labels: King Records (AKB48); Avex Trax (Anrire)
- Formerly of: AKB48, AnRiRe

Rena Kato (加藤 玲奈, Katō Rena; born July 10, 1997) is a Japanese hairdresser, makeup artist and former idol, tarento, model, & actress. She is a former member of the Japanese female idol group AKB48 and was in Team A.

She was also a member, along with her good friends Anna Iriyama and Rina Kawaei, of a one-shot AKB48 subunit named AnRiRe. Formed in 2012, the trio released their first and only single "Ikujinashi Masquerade" with Rino Sashihara from HKT48, charting at number one in Japan.

== Biography ==
Kato was born on July 10, 1997, in Chiba Prefecture, Japan. As a child, she appeared in many magazines as a model, and subsequently joined AKB48, aspiring to become a famous model someday. She joined AKB48 to pursue that dream, with the encouragement of her friends.

Kato participated in the 10th-generation auditions held by AKB48, and joined as a kenkyuusei trainee in March 2010. She officially participated on AKB48 singles on Chance no Junban's coupling song, titled "Fruits Snow", as part of Team Kenkyusei. On December 17, 2011, Rena Katō, together with two other members of AKB48, Ami Maeda and Anna Iriyama, held a large autograph-signing event in Hong Kong.

At the end of 2011, while still an AKB48 trainee, she appeared on the cover of the Japanese magazine Weekly Playboy with seven other top members of AKB48 and SKE48. It was the last issue of 2011. In 2012, she participated in the AKB48 drama Majisuka Gakuen 3, which was a sequel to the series, but with a different storyline completely unrelated to the previous adaptations. She was also promoted to Team 4 on March 23, 2012. Soon after the TV series Shiritsu Bakaleya Kōkō ended on June 30, 2012, it was announced that Rena Katō would participate in its film adaptation. The series and movie starred several Johnny's Jr. and AKB48 members. She participated on her first A-side in AKB48 on the summer single titled "Manatsu No Sounds Good!".

She was transferred to Team B after the AKB48 Tokyo Dome Shuffle on August 24, 2012, where her then-team, the first version of Team 4, was disbanded. In 2013, she participated in her second A-side in AKB48 on the summer single "Sayonara Crawl", which included 38 members. She got her first center song in "Heart Electric", the 33rd single's B-side, "Kaisoku To Dotai Shiryoku", as the center of Undergirls, a duo center with SKE48 member Suda Akari. In 2014, she got a knee injury and had to temporarily postpone her AKB48 activities, as a result, she was not able to participate in the Unit Matsuri 2014, as well as the AKB48 Request Hour Set List Best 200, except on the final day. Even with an injury, she and Yuki Kashiwagi held a large autograph-signing and handshake event in Hong Kong with thousands of fans. She resumed her activities on February 16, 2014. She was transferred back to Team 4 during the AKB48 Group Daisokaku Matsuri. She joined the Senbatsu for the third time in the 37th single's A-side, titled "Labrador Retriever", released on May 21, 2014. On March 26, 2015, she was transferred back to team B in the AKB48 Spring Shuffle 2015 event.

From 2015 to 2017, Kato held annual contests called Renacchi Sōsenkyo (れなっち総選挙; "Renacchi Elections"), inspired by the AKB48 Group's Senbatsu Sōsenkyo. It started when Kato made a list of her favorite members on social media at her fans' request, but received the approval of Yasushi Akimoto shortly after and eventually became an official event. Every year, AKB48 Group members can apply for the opportunity to take part in singles, photoshoots, and theatrical productions organized by her. Despite the name, the winners are decided by Kato and her team instead of by election.

On December 16, 2021, during a YouTube livestream, Kato announced her graduation from AKB48 to pursue a career as a beautician. Her last theater performance was on February 14, 2022, and her final group activity was on February 20. She states that she will continue performing arts activities while pursuing cosmetology.

Her official fanclub, "Rena's dresser", was launched on March 1, 2022, 9 days after graduating from AKB48.

On September 30, 2023, Kato announced via Instagram that she had obtained a beautician's license.

On April 14, 2024, Kato opened a second Instagram account that focuses on her hair and makeup career.

On July 31, 2026, Kato's fanclub was closed. The following day, August 1, she announced her departure from Mama&Son.

== Personal life ==
On August 8, 2025, Kato announced her marriage to her non-celebrity boyfriend.

== Discography ==
=== Singles ===
==== With AKB48 ====
Year	No.	Title	Role	Notes
2010	19	"Chance no Junban"	B-side	Her first single appearance in AKB48. Did not participate in title track. Sang on the track "Fruits Snow" as Team Kenkyuusei.
2011	20	"Sakura no Ki ni Narō"	B-side	Did not participate in title track. Sang on the track "Ougon Center" as Team Kenkyuusei.
2011	21	"Everyday, Katyusha"	B-side	Did not participate in title track. Sang on the track "Anti" as Team Kenkyuusei.
2011	23	"Kaze wa Fuiteiru"	B-side	Did not participate in title track. Sang on the track "Kimi No Senaka" as Undergirls, and on "Tsubomitachi" as Team 4 + Kenkyuusei.
2012	25	"Give Me Five!"	Special Girls A	Did not participate in title track. Sang on the track "New Ship" as part of Special Girls A.
2012	26	"Manatsu no Sounds Good!"	A-side, Selection 10	Her first participation on an A-side. Also sang on the track "Choudai, Darling!" as part of Selection 10.
2012	27	"Gingham Check"	B-side	Did not rank on the election. Sang on the track "Ano Hi No Fuurin" as Waiting Girls.
2012	28	"Uza"	B-side, New Team B	Did not participate on title track. Sang on the track "Tsugi No Season" as Undergirls, and on "Seigi No Mikata Janai Hero" as New Team B. She is now part of Team B.
2012	29	"Eien Pressure"	B-side, OKL48	Did not participate on title track; lineup was determined by rock-paper-scissors tournament. Sang on "Watashitachi No Reason"; and on "Eien Yori Tsuzuku Yōu Ni" as part of OKL48.
2013	30	"So Long!"	B-side	Did not participate on title track. Sang on the track "Waiting Room" as Undergirls, and on "Sokode Inu no Unchi Funjau Kane?" as Team B.
2013	31	"Sayonara Crawl"	A-side	Also sang on "Romance Kenjuu" as Team B.
2013	33	"Heart Electric"	B-side, Center	Did not participate on title track. Sang on the track "Kaisoku To Doutai Shiryoku" as the center of Undergirls, a duo center with Suda Akari.
2013	34	"Suzukake no Ki no Michi de "Kimi no Hohoemi o Yume ni Miru" to Itte Shimattara Bokutachi no Kankei wa Dō Kawatte Shimau no ka, Bokunari ni Nan-nichi ka Kangaeta Ue de no Yaya Kihazukashii Ketsuron no Yō na Mono"	B-side	Did not participate on title track; lineup was determined by rock-paper-scissors tournament. Sang on the track "Mosh & Dive" as Undergirls, and "Party Is Over" as AKB48 Senbatsu.
2014	35	"Mae Shika Mukanee"	B-side	Did not participate on title track. Sang on the track "Kino Yori Motto Suki" as Undergirls.
2014	36	"Labrador Retriever"	A-side	Also sang on "Heart no Dasshutsu Game" as New Team 4. She is now part of Team 4.
2014	37	"Kokoro no Placard"	B-side	Ranked 32nd in 2014 General Election. Sang on "Dareka ga Nageta Ball" as Undergirls.
2014	38	"Kiboteki Refrain"	A-Side	Also sang on "Me o Akete Mama no First Kiss" as part of Team 4.
2015	39	"Green Flash"	B-side	Sang "Haru no Hikari Chikadzuita Natsu"
2015	40	"Bokutachi wa Tatakawanai"	A-side	
2015	41	"Halloween Night"	B-side	Did not participate on title track. Ranked 28th in 2015 General Election. Also sang on "Sayonara Surfboard", "Ippome Ondo", "Yankee Machine Gun" and "Gunzou".
2015	42	"Kuchibiru ni Be My Baby"	A-Side	Also sang on "Madona's Choice" as a part of Renacchi's Senbatsu Sousenkyo and "Kin no Hane wo Motsu Hito yo" as part of Team B.
2016	43	"Kimi wa Melody"	A-side	Marked as the 10th Anniversary Single. Also sang on "LALALA Message" as Next Generation Senbatsu and "Mazariau Mono" as NogizakaAKB.
2016	44	"Tsubasa wa Iranai"	A-side	Sang on "Koi o Suru to Baka o Miru" as Team B.
2016	45	"Love Trip / Shiawase wo Wakenasai"	B-side	Also sang "Densetsu no Sakana" as Under Girls and "Black Flower".
2016	46	"High Tension"	A-side	Sang on "Happy End" as Team B.
2017	47	"Shoot Sign"	A-side	Sang on "Accident Chū"
2017	48	"Negaigoto no Mochigusare"	A-side	
2017	49	"#sukinanda"	B-side	Did not participate on title track. Sang on the track "Darashinai Aishikata" as Undergirls, and on "Give Up wa Shinai" as Tofu Pro Wrestling.
2017	50	"11gatsu no Anklet"	A-side	
2018	51	"Jabaja"	A-side	
2018	52	"Teacher Teacher"	A-side	Sang on "Romantic Junbichuu" as Team A.
2018	53	"Sentimental Train"	B-side	Did not participate on title track. Ranked 36th in 2018 General Election. Sang on "Tomodachi ja nai ka?" as Next Girls.
2018	54	"No Way Man"	B-side	Did not participate on title track. Sang on "Ike no Mizu wo Nukitai" as Ike no Mizu Senbatsu.
2019	55	"Jiwaru Days"	B-side	Did not participate on title track. Sang on "Generation Change" as AKB48 Coupling Senbatsu.
2019	56	"Sustainable"	B-side	Did not participate on title track. Sang on "Seishun Da Capo".
2020	—	"Hanarete Ite mo"	—	Charity song during the COVID-19 pandemic
2021	58	"Nemohamo Rumor"	B-side	Her very last single appearance in AKB48. Did not participate in title track. Sang on "Black Jaguar" as First Generation.

=== Albums ===
==== With AKB48 ====
Year	Title	Album	Notes
2011	High School Days	Koko ni Ita Koto	Her first album appearance in AKB48. She participated as an AKB48 trainee.
2011	Koko ni Ita Koto	Koko ni Ita Koto	Sang with AKB48, SKE48, NMB48, and SDN48 members.
2012	Itsuka Mita Umi no Soko	1830m	Sang as Up-And-Coming Girls.
2012	Chokkaku Sunshine	1830m	Sang by Team 4 members.
2012	Yasashisa no Chizu	1830m	Sang by Selection 10. The song was used for a campaign with AKB48 and the Japanese Red Cross.
2012	Aozora yo Sabishikunai ka?	1830m	Sang with AKB48, SKE48, NMB48, and the HKT48 members.
2014	Watashi Leaf	Tsugi no Ashiato	Sang with Rina Kawaei, Anna Iriyama, and Jurina Matsui.
2014	Ponkotsu Blues	Tsugi no Ashiato	Sang by Majisuka Gakuen 3 main cast.
2014	Kanashiki Kinkyori Renai	Tsugi no Ashiato	Sang with Team B.
2015	Koko ga Rhodes da, Koko de Tobe!	Koko ga Rhodes da, Koko de Tobe!	Sang with AKB48, SKE48, NMB48, HKT48 members and Rina Ikoma from Nogizaka46.
2015	Namida wa ato Mawashi	Koko ga Rhodes da, Koko de Tobe!	Sang with Team 4.
2015	Music Junkie	0 to 1 no Aida	Sang with Team B.
2015	Rosario	0 to 1 no Aida	Sang with Anna Iriyama, Yuria Kizaki and Haruka Kodama.
2017	Ano Hi no Jibun	Thumbnail	Sang with AKB48.
2017	Tanjobi TANGO	Thumbnail	Sang with Anna Iriyama and Haruna Kojima.
2018	Kutsuhimo no Musubikata	Bokutachi wa, Ano Hi no Yoake o Shitteiru	Sang with Album Senbatsu.
2018	Kiss Campaign	Bokutachi wa, Ano Hi no Yoake o Shitteiru	Sang with Anna Iriyama and Sakura Miyawaki.

==== With Sashihara Rino with Anrire ====
- Ikujinashi Masquerade (October 17, 2012)

===== Chart performance =====
Title	Release date	Chart position		Oricon sales		Notes
Title	Release date	Oricon Weekly Singles Chart	Billboard Japan Hot 100	First week	Total	Notes
"Ikujinashi Masquerade" (意気地なしマスカレード; "Sissy Masquerade")	October 17, 2012	1	4	68,403	81,769	Single by Sashihara Rino with Anrire

== Stage units ==
Team Kenkyūusei 4th Stage "Theater no Megami"

1. "Hatsukoi yo, Konnichiwa" (初恋よ こんにちは)

Team B 5th Stage "Theater no Megami"

1. "Romance Kakurenbo (Zenza Girls)" (ロマンスかくれんぼ)

Team K 6th Stage "Reset"

1. "Lemon No Toshigoro (Zenza Girls)" (檸檬の年頃)

Team A 5th Stage "Mokugekisha"

1. "Miniskirt No Yosei (Zenza Girls)" (ミニスカートの妖精)

Team 4 1st Stage "Boku No Taiyo"

1. "Idol Nante Yobanaide" (アイドルなんて呼ばないで)

Team B Waiting Stage

1. "Dakishimeraretara" (抱きしめられたら)

Team 4 3rd Stage "Idol No Yoake"

1. "Kataomoi No Taikakusen (Center)" (片思いの対角線)

== Appearances ==
=== Movies ===
- Gekijōban Shiritsu Bakaleya Kōkō (October 13, 2012)
- Nidome no Natsu, Nidoto Aenai Kimi (September 1, 2017)
- Tsujiura Renbo (May 21, 2022)

=== TV dramas ===
- Majisuka Gakuen 2 (Final episode, July 1, 2011, TV Tokyo) - Rena
- Majisuka Gakuen 3 (Episode 2 — final episode, July 20 — October 5, 2012, TV Tokyo) - Shokkaku
- So Long! (Team B episode - February 13, 2013, TV Tokyo) - Yuka
- Majisuka Gakuen 4 (Episode 1 — final episode, January 19 — March 30, 2015, Nippon Television) - Dodobusu
- Majisuka Gakuen 5 (Episode 1 — final episode, August 24 — October 27, 2015, Nippon Television, Hulu) - Dodobusu
- AKB Horror Night: Adrenaline's Night Ep.23 - There's, Another One (2015) - Shōko
- Kyabasuka Gakuen (Episode 5 — final episode, December 4, 2015 — January 4, 2016, Nippon Television) - Dodobusu
- Tofu Pro Wrestling (January 22 — July 2, 2016, TV Asahi) - Cutie Renacchi

=== Variety shows ===
- AKBingo! (April 2, 2011 - 2021, TV Tokyo)
- Shukan AKB (June 1, 2011 - May 25, 2012, TV Tokyo)
- Ariyoshi AKB Kyowakoku (January 20, 2011 - March 29, 2016, TBS)
- AKB Nemousu TV (Season 8 - 9, Family Gekijo)

|- | 27

- AKB Konto, Bimyo (October 20, 2011 - November 3, 2011, Hikari TV Channel)
- AKB48 to Chome Chome! (Yomiuri TV)
- AKB48 no Anta, Dare? (NotTV)
- AKB Kousagi Dojo (December 7, 2012 - March 28, 2014, TV Tokyo)
- Saturday Night Child Machine (April 13, 2013 - June 29, 2013, TV Tokyo)
- AKB Kanko Taishi (April 10, 2014, FujiTV)
