= Ikujinashi Masquerade =

Single by Rino Sashihara with Anrire
- B-side: "Soft Cream Kiss"; "If no Mōsō" (Type-A); "Maji de Koi Suru 5byō Mae" (Type-B); "Ikujinashi Masquerade (Hakata-ben ver.) (Type-C); "Tōi Machi e" (Type-D)
- Released: October 17, 2012 (Japan)
- Genre: J-pop
- Label: Avex Trax
- Composer: Shunsuke Tanaka
- Lyricist: Yasushi Akimoto
- Producer: Yasushi Akimoto

Rino Sashihara with Anrire singles chronology
"Soredemo Suki Da yo" (2012)	"Ikujinashi Masquerade" (2012)

Music videos
- Rino Sashihara with Anrire "Ikujinashi Masquerade" (Kawaei Rina Center ver.) (preview) on YouTube
- Rino Sashihara with Anrire "Ikujinashi Masquerade"; Gekijōban Muse no Kagami ver. (preview) on YouTube

"Ikujinashi Masquerade" (意気地なしマスカレード, Ikujinashi Masukarēdo; "Sissy Masquerade") is the second solo single by Rino Sashihara, a Japanese idol singer who is part of the AKB48 sister group HKT48. It was released in Japan on October 17, 2012. It features the unit Anrire, whose name is a portmanteau of AKB48 members Anna Iriyama, Rina Kawaei and Rena Katō.

The single charted at number one in the Japanese Oricon weekly singles chart, which made it only the third solo single by an AKB48 member ever to do so.

== Background ==
The single was released in four versions: Type-A, Type-B, Type-C, and Type-D.

== Personnel ==
- Rino Sashihara
- Anrire
  - Anna Iriyama
  - Rina Kawaei
  - Rena Katō

== Track listing ==
=== Type-A ===
CD
No.	Title	Length
1.	"Ikujinashi Masquerade" (意気地なしマスカレード Ikujinashi Masukarēdo)
2.	"Soft Cream Kiss" (ソフトクリーム・キス Sofutokurīmu Kisu)
3.	"If no Mōsō" (ifの妄想)
4.	"Ikujinashi Masquerade (Instrumental)" (意気地なしマスカレード（off vocal ver.）)
5.	"Soft Cream Kiss (Instrumental)" (ソフトクリーム・キス（off vocal ver.）)
6.	"If no Mōsō (Instrumental)" (ifの妄想（off vocal ver.）)

DVD
No.	Title	Length
1.	""Ikujinashi Masquerade" Music Video (Kawaei Rina Center ver.)" (「意気地なしマスカレード」Music Video 〜川栄李奈センターver.)
2.	"Sashihara Rino no Omotenashi (Anrire to Atta ka Nabe Party)" (指原莉乃のおもてなし 〜アンリレとあったか鍋パーティー Sashihara Rino no Omotenashi (Anrire to Atta ka Nabe Pātī)

=== Type-B ===
CD
No.	Title	Length
1.	"Ikujinashi Masquerade" (意気地なしマスカレード Ikujinashi Masukarēdo)
2.	"Soft Cream Kiss" (ソフトクリーム・キス Sofutokurīmu Kisu)
3.	"Maji de Koi Suru 5byō Mae" (MajiでKoiする5秒前)
4.	"Ikujinashi Masquerade (Instrumental)" (意気地なしマスカレード（off vocal ver.）)
5.	"Soft Cream Kiss (Instrumental)" (ソフトクリーム・キス（off vocal ver.）)
6.	"Maji de Koi Suru 5byō Mae (Instrumental)" (MajiでKoiする5秒前（off vocal ver.）)

DVD
No.	Title	Length
1.	""Ikujinashi Masquerade" Music Video (Sashihara Rino Center ver.)" (1.「意気地なしマスカレード」Music Video 〜指原莉乃センターver.)
2.	"Sashihara Rino vs Anrire Sashiko no Quiz Taikai" (指原莉乃 vs アンリレ さしこのクイズ大会)

=== Type-C ===
CD
No.	Title	Length
1.	"Ikujinashi Masquerade" (意気地なしマスカレード Ikujinashi Masukarēdo)
2.	"Soft Cream Kiss" (ソフトクリーム・キス Sofutokurīmu Kisu)
3.	"Ikujinashi Masquerade (Hakata-ben ver.)" (意気地なしマスカレード（博多弁ver.） "Sissy Masquerade" (Hakata dialect version))
4.	"Ikujinashi Masquerade (Instrumental)" (意気地なしマスカレード（off vocal ver.）)
5.	"Soft Cream Kiss (Instrumental)" (ソフトクリーム・キス（off vocal ver.）)

DVD
No.	Title	Length
1.	""Ikujinashi Masquerade" Music Video (Kawaei Rina Center ver.)" (「意気地なしマスカレード」Music Video 〜川栄李奈センターver.)
2.	""Ikujinashi Masquerade" Music Video "Gekijōban Muse no Kagami: My Pretty Doll" Tokubetsu Henshūban" (「意気地なしマスカレード」Music Video 〜映画『劇場版ミューズの鏡〜マイプリティドール〜』特別編集版)

=== Type-D ===
Mu-mo shop limited edition.

CD
No.	Title	Length
1.	"Ikujinashi Masquerade" (意気地なしマスカレード Ikujinashi Masukarēdo)
2.	"Soft Cream Kiss" (ソフトクリーム・キス Sofutokurīmu Kisu)
3.	"Tōi Machi e" (遠い街へ)
4.	"Ikujinashi Masquerade (Instrumental)" (意気地なしマスカレード（off vocal ver.）)
5.	"Soft Cream Kiss (Instrumental)" (ソフトクリーム・キス（off vocal ver.）)
6.	"Tōi Machi e (Instrumental)" (遠い街へ（off vocal ver.）)

== Charts ==
Chart (2012)	Peak position
Oricon Daily Singles Chart	1
Oricon Weekly Singles Chart	1
Oricon Monthly Singles Chart	6
Oricon Yearly Singles Chart	93
Billboard Japan Hot 100	4
Billboard Japan Hot Top Airplay	53
Billboard Japan Hot Singles Sales	2
Billboard Japan Adult Contemporary Airplay	39
