= Sae Miyazawa =

Japanese actress, former idol

Sae Miyazawa 宮澤 佐江
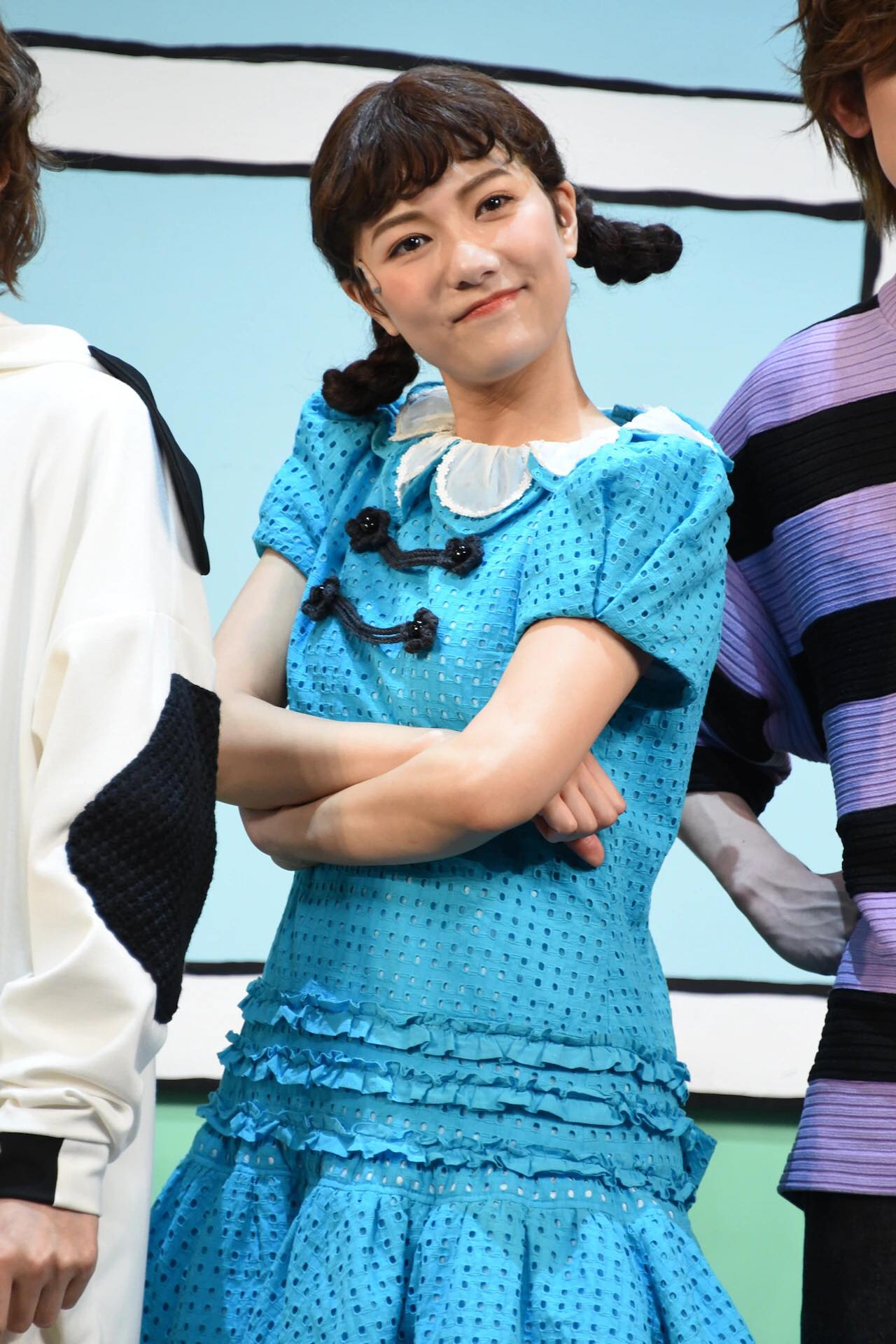

Background information
- Also known as: Sae-chan (さえちゃん), Genking (ゲンキング)
- Born: 13 August 1990 (age 36)
- Origin: Tokyo, Japan
- Genre: J-pop
- Occupations: Singer; actress
- Years active: 2006-present
- Labels: You, Be Cool! / King, avex
- Formerly of: AKB48; SNH48; SKE48; Chocolove from AKB48; Diva

Sae Miyazawa (宮澤 佐江, Miyazawa Sae; born August 13, 1990 in Tokyo) is a Japanese actress, television personality and former singer, signed under the entertainment agency Horipro. She is best known for her affiliations with AKB48 and its various sister- and subgroups. Between 2006 and 2016, she was a part of the promoting line up of 33 AKB48 and 4 SKE48 single releases.

== Music career ==
=== 2006–2012: AKB48 ===
After being rejected during the first audition for AKB48, Miyazawa auditioned again in February 2006 in an applicant pool of about twelve thousand aspiring idols. This time, she was selected as one of the 19 girls for AKB48's newly created Team K, which made its stage debut on April 1, 2006. She stayed with Team K and AKB48 until August 2012.

During this period, Miyazawa participated in the title tracks of 25 of the 27 AKB48 single releases, missing only the A-sides of "Chance no Junban" and "Ue kara Mariko", for which the featured members were determined by a rock-paper-scissors-tournament. In October 2011, she was named the AKB48 member with the most appearances in the popular music show Music Japan on NHK, with 34 performances. Although this underlines her role as one of the promotional fixtures of the group at that time, she did not reach the popularity level of fellow members like Atsuko Maeda or Oshima Yuko. Within her time in the group, she became a member of two AKB48 side projects: Chocolove from AKB48 was established in 2007 as a trio with fellow AKB48 members Sayaka Akimoto and Rina Nakanishi. The group released two singles and an album, but disbanded in 2008 following Nakanishi's departure from AKB48. In 2011, AKB48 announced that she and Akimoto would be part of another spin-off called Diva, along with Ayaka Umeda and Yuka Masuda. Following the departure of Akimoto and Masuda, Diva was disbanded in late 2014, after releasing a farewell single and album.

In January 2011, an exhibition of her self-portraits was held at the AKB48 Official Shop in Hong Kong, She then visited Hong Kong on January 28, and attended a series of events, including an AKB48 Cosplay Event held in Dragon Centre in Kowloon. In March 2012, during AKB48's trip to the National Cherry Blossom Festival, Miyazawa visited the Strong John Thomson Elementary School in Washington, D.C., to explain Japanese pop culture to the pupils.

=== 2012–2015: SNH48 and SKE48 ===
In August 2012, it was announced that Miyazawa and fellow AKB48 member Mariya Suzuki would be transferred overseas to help lead Shanghai-based sister group SNH48. This transfer was initially scheduled to last six to twelve months, while the affected members were still affiliated with AKB48, as "Team Abroad" (海外, kaigai). Because she and Suzuki did not have working visas for China, they rarely appeared with SNH48; for instance, they only appeared as audience members for the group's first public performance. They however did appear together as group representatives at the Japanese Night at the Summer Davos in Tianjin, China, and were mentioned in the official diary of the Japanese prime minister. During the opening ceremony of SNH48's theater in Shanghai in September 2013, group officials announced that Miyazawa would begin to perform with the group on October 11, 2013. Indeed, both Miyazawa and Suzuki debuted with SNH48 on that date, triggering media coverage in both Japan and China. Her endeavors as a Japanese idol in a Chinese environment made the Japanese Ministry of Education, Culture, Sports, Science and Technology name Miyazawa a representative for the "Tobitate! Ryugaku Japan"-campaign ("Take off! Study abroad!").

In January 2013, during the annual "Request Hour" concerts held by all Japanese AKB48 acts, the Miyazawa-led song "Kiseki wa Mani Awanai" ranked second in fan voting. Following this, Miyazawa promoted AKB48's 30th single "So Long!" in TV broadcasts, even though she did not participate in the actual single recording. In March 2013, Miyazawa started a Twitter account, but this was suspended when it gathered too many followers on the first day; her Twitter was reopened two days later. Meanwhile, Miyazawa took part in AKB48's 31st single "Sayonara Crawl".

During the AKB48 Group Rinji Sokai concert in Nippon Budokan in April 2013, AKB48 announced her return to Team K and concurrent membership with SNH48. In the 2013 AKB48 general election, she finished tenth overall. During the election results event, she declared her plans to focus on SNH48, and after confirmation with AKB48 management, became the first AKB48 member to voluntarily drop concurrency. As a result, she did not participate in the rock-paper-scissors tournament in 2013 and rarely appeared with the group until February 2014, when AKB48 announced Miyazawa's transfer to Nagoya-based SKE48 at the Grand Reformation Festival, while staying a concurrent member of SNH48. She was appointed the 'leader' of SKE48's Team S. This time, she accepted the new position after learning of the transfer via a live phone call from that event. However, she suffered a significant decrease in popularity in the process, as she lost over 21000 votes compared to 2013 in the 2014 AKB48 general election, but still managed to maintain the 12th position overall. In SKE48, Miyazawa appeared frequently as one of the leading members in commercial campaigns, TV and stage performances, and had since then been selected to appear in AKB48's 38th single, her first regular single appearance since Sayonara Crawl, and her 29th title track performance overall. In the general election for the 41st single in 2015, she recovered from the heavy loss in 2014, by adding 31,000 votes to her result and ranking in at the 8th position, her personal best. Before the event, she stated that she would not be participating in future fan elections. By the end of 2015, she had appeared in 32 single A-sides of AKB48, trailing only five other members. Kuchibiru ni Be My Baby, AKB48's 10th anniversary single, marked her return to the main selection of promoting members of AKB48 releases. It was her first appearance in a management selected conventional line up of 16 members since Give Me Five! in 2012, before her transfer to SNH48.

=== 2016: Departure from 48 Group ===
During the nationwide broadcast of the music show "FNS", Miyazawa announced her departure from SKE48 and SNH48 at an undefined date in 2016. She is the second member to announce her so-called "graduation" from the group on national TV, after Oshima Yuko on Kōhaku Uta Gassen in 2014. Following this, the Miyazawa-centered song "Kiseki wa Mani Awanai" was voted into the first place in the 2016 edition of the Request Hour concert series. During this event, a two-day concert at Nippon Gaishi Hall dedicated to her farewell was announced. She eventually left the group in March 2016, after farewell performances in the theaters of all three groups she was affiliated with (SNH48, SKE48, AKB48).

== Solo activities and acting career ==
As a member of the AKB48 group, Miyazawa has been promoted in many of AKB48's own shows, but also frequently appeared in Japanese radio and TV. She has published two photobooks; one in 2009 titled "Kanojo" and one in 2015 titled "Namida no Yukue". Occasionally, she was cast as an actress for feature films, stage plays and Japanese TV dramas. In January 2014, Miyazawa was selected to play a major role in the stage play Wings of Kuzariana (クザリアーナの翼), the 13th volume of the Gorgeous Earth series, which was performed in Tokyo, Osaka, Nagoya, and Fukuoka. In July 2014, it was announced that she would play the male lead role in the stage adaption of the manga "AKB49: Ren'ai Kinshi Jōrei". 2014 ended with her being cast in ntv's special primetime drama "Dr. Nurse Aid" (Dr.ナースエイド) in November. In March 2015, she performed in the gala concert celebrating the 20th anniversary of the stage play series Gorgeous Earth, she appeared in 2013/2014. Some months later, it was announced that Miyazawa would perform in the stage adaptation of the popular shōjo manga "Crest of the Royal Family" by Chieko Hosokawa, scheduled for 2016. She was cast for the role of the main protagonist, sharing the role with Seiko Niizuma. After finishing the play, Miyazawa collaborated with the cosplay boy group ARSMAGNA on their single Kibun Joujou, and concluded the year by scoring a main role in the TV Asahi drama Ossan's Love. She also appeared in a number of TV variety programs, for example Hirunandesu! and Rôkaru rosen basu noritsugi no tabi. In July 2018, Miyazawa terminated her contract with Flave Entertainment, and signed to media agency Horipro Entertainment a year later. In between she was on a hiatus from entertainment. As of 2019, Miyazawa has become a regular musical actress, having appeared nationwide in a number of successful stage plays, with her most recent signing as a double cast with accomplished Japanese singer May J. in the Japanese run of West Side Story. In 2022, she was cast as Sawa Kaizaki in Ultraman Decker on TV Tokyo, the 34th installment of the Ultraman Series. She reprised her role in the sequel movie Ultraman Decker Finale: Journey to Beyond.

== Reception ==
Miyazawa, who is often called "Sae-chan" (さえちゃん) by fans and media, belonged to the most popular members of the 48 group family with consistent high finishes in audience polls. In the AKB48 general elections, in which the lineup (called "senbatsu") for a given single is decided by fan voting, she placed 14th (2009), 9th (2010), 11th (2011), 11th (2012), 10th (2013), 12th(2014), and 8th (2015), respectively, which gave her a spot on the related title tracks. She is one of five members to make it to the senbatsu ranks in the first seven elections. Miyazawa and Sayaka Akimoto were frequently referred to as the "Twin Towers" of Team K, because of their comparably tall height and their key roles in that team. Another nickname she bears is "Genking" (from Japanese "genki" = energetic, cheerful), as she is often portrayed as loud, impulsive and energetic. She is also known as AKB48's "handsome idol" (Japanese: "ikemen idol") due to her tomboyish mannerisms and image. Accordingly, she was named as the idol best suited to act male roles and stereotypes in a 2017 survey among college students. Among members of the AKB48 groups, a disproportionately high fraction of her fan following is female.

In the animated series AKB0048, the character Miyazawa Sae The 10th / Asamiya Youko is modeled after her, voiced by Mai Nakahara.

== Discography ==
=== AKB48 ===
==== Main singles ====
Year	No.	Title	Role	Notes
2006	1	"Aitakatta"	A-side	Debut with Team K.
2007	2	"Seifuku ga Jama o Suru"	A-side	
2007	3	"Keibetsu Shiteita Aijō"	A-side	
2007	4	"Bingo!"	A-side	
2007	5	"Boku no Taiyō"	A-side	
2007	6	"Yūhi o Miteiru ka?"	A-side	
2008	7	"Romance, Irane"	A-side	
2008	8	"Sakura no Hanabiratachi 2008"	A-side	
2008	9	"Baby! Baby! Baby!"	A-side	
2008	10	"Ōgoe Diamond"	A-side	
2009	11	"10nen Sakura"	A-side	Also featured in "Sakurairo no Sora no Shita de"
2009	12	"Namida Surprise!"	A-side	
2009	13	"Iiwake Maybe"	A-side	Ranked 14th in 2009 General Election
2009	14	"River"	A-side	
2010	15	"Sakura no Shiori"	A-side, Team PB	Also appeared in "Enkyori Poster" as Team PB.
2010	16	"Ponytail to Shushu"	A-side	Also featured in "Majijo Teppen Blues"
2010	17	"Heavy Rotation"	A-side	Ranked 9th in 2010 General Election. Also featured in "Yasai Sisters" and "Lucky Seven".
2010	18	"Beginner"	A-side	
2010	19	"Chance no Junban"	B-side	Was not featured in the title track; lineup was determined by rock-paper-scissors tournament. Sang on "Yoyakushita Christmas", and "Alive" (as Team K).
2011	20	"Sakura no Ki ni Narō"	A-side	
2011	21	"Everyday, Katyusha"	A-side	Also appeared in "Korekara Wonderland" and "Yankee Soul".
2011	22	"Flying Get"	A-side	Ranked 11th in 2011 General Election. Also featured in "Seishun to Kizukanai Mama" and "Yasai Uranai"
2011	23	"Kaze wa Fuiteiru"	A-side	
2011	24	"Ue kara Mariko"	B-side	Was not featured in the title track; lineup was determined by rock-paper-scissors tournament; She was featured in "Noël no Yoru"; and on "Zero Sum Taiyou" as Team K.
2012	25	"Give Me Five!"	A-side (Baby Blossom), Special Girls B	Appeared in the chorus with Baby Blossom; featured in "Hitsujikai no Tabi" as part of Special Girls B.
2012	26	"Manatsu no Sounds Good!"	A-side	She also was featured in "Kimi no Tame ni Boku wa".
2012	27	"Gingham Check"	A-side	Ranked 11th in 2012 General Election.
2012	29	"Eien Pressure"	B-side	Did not appear in the title track; lineup was determined by rock-paper-scissors tournament. Featured in "Watashitachi no Reason". First single after her transfer to SNH48.
2013	31	"Sayonara Crawl"	A-side	She is credited as SNH48 / AKB48 Team K for this single.
2013	32	"Koi Suru Fortune Cookie"	A-side	Ranked 10th in 2013 General Election. She is credited as SNH48 on this single. Also appeared in "Namida no Sei Janai" and "Saigo no Door".
2014	37	"Kokoro no Placard"	A-side	Ranked 12th in 2014 General Election.
2014	38	"Kibōteki Refrain"	A-side	Senbatsu – Group B
2015	39	"Green Flash"	B-side	Featured in 'Sekai ga Naiteru Nara' instead.
2015	40	"Bokutachi wa Tatakawanai"	A-side	Also featured in 'Summer Side'.
2015	41	"Halloween Night"	A-side	Ranked 8th in 2015 General Election.
2015	42	"Kuchibiru ni Be My Baby"	A-side	Also featured in "Senaka Kotoba".
2016	43	"Kimi wa Melody"	A-side	Marked as the 10th Anniversary Single. Last single to participate. Also featured in "Gonna Jump".

==== Albums ====
Song participiations aside from single title track recordings:

- Koko ni Ita Koto (2011), 4 songs
- 1830m (2012), 2 songs
- Tsugi no Ashiato (2014), 4 songs
- Koko ga Rhodes da, Koko de Tobe! (2015), 2 songs

==== Team Surprise ====
She participated in the first two incarnations of Team Surprise, a subunit formed for a Pachinko machine campaign, but was not selected for the third:

- Suteki na Sankaku Kankei (素敵な三角関係)
- Namida ni Shizumu Taiyou (涙に沈む太陽)
- Kimi ga Omotteru yori (キミが思ってるより)
- Megami wa Doko de Hohoemu? (女神はどこで微笑む？)

==== Other singles participation ====
- "Dareka no Tame Ni (誰かのために) - What can I do for someone?" (2011)
- "Koi no Onawa (恋のお縄)" (2011)
- "Tenohira ga Kataru Koto (掌が語ること)" (2013)
- "Enjoy your life!" (2013), on Tomomi Kasai's second single release, "Mine"
- "Datte, Ame Janai? (だって、雨じゃない)", on Love Crescendo first single release "Koppu no Naka no Komorebi (コップの中の木漏れ日)"

=== SKE48 ===
==== Main singles ====
Year	No.	Title	Role	Notes
2014	15	"Bukiyō Taiyō"	A-side	Also appeared in "Houkago Race" with Team S
2015	16	"12 Gatsu no Kangaroo"	A-side	Also appeared in "Kesenai Honoo" with Team S
2015	17	"Coquettish Jūtai Chū"	A-side	Also appeared in "DIRTY" with Team S
2015	18	"Maenomeri"	A-side	Also appeared in "Sutekina Zaiakukan" with Team S
2016	19	"Chicken Line"	Graduation song	Featured in "Tabi no Tochū".

=== ARSMAGNA ===
- Kibun Joujou as SAE TOKIMIYA

== Filmography ==
=== Movies ===
Year	Title	Role	Notes	Reference
2007	Densen Uta	C-chan		
2009	Three-day Boys (スリーデイボーイズ)	Younger sister of leading actor		
2011	Kōkō Debut (高校デビュー)	Mami Takahashi		
2012	Ultraman Saga (ウルトラマンサーガ)	Sawa		
2016	9tsu no Mado / Kaiso Densha (9つの窓 / 回想電車)	Passenger	AKB Shortshorts project	
2023	Ultraman Decker Finale: Journey to Beyond	Sawa Kaizaki		
2027	10 Things I Want to Do Before I Turn 40: The Movie			

=== TV dramas ===
Year	Title	Role	Reference
2008	Tadashii Ouji no Tsukuri Kata (正しい王子のつくり方)	Koharu Kido (城戸小春)	
2008	Koizora (恋空)	Manami (マナミ)	
2008	Tetsudō Musume (episode 5 & 6) (鉄道むすめ 第5・6話)	Mīna Ōtsuki (大月みーな)	
2008–2009	Ai no Gekijō Love Letter (愛の劇場 ラブレター)	Chie Nonomura(in high-school age) (野々村知恵（中高生時代）)	
2010	Majisuka Gakuen (マジすか学園)	Gakuran (学ラン)	
2010	Arienai (episode 5) (あり得ない)	Aya Takano (高野アヤ)	
2011	Sakura kara no tegami (桜からの手紙 〜AKB48 それぞれの卒業物語〜)	Sae Miyazawa (宮澤佐江)	
2011	Majisuka Gakuen 2 (マジすか学園2)	Yōran(Gakuran) (洋ラン（学ラン）)	
2012	Counter no Futari season 2(episode 11) (カウンターのふたり シーズン2)	Young mother	
2013	Detarame Hero (episode 6) (でたらめヒーロー)	Moe Hoshino	
2014	Dr. Nurse Aid (Dr.ナースエイド)	Nurse	
2016	Ossan's Love (おっさんずラブ)	Minato Asuka	
2022	Candy Color Paradox	Kaori	
2022-2023	Ultraman Decker (ウルトラマンデッカー)	Sawa Kaizaki (カイザキ サワ)	

=== Television (Excerpts) ===
Aside of numerous appearances in most of the group's house shows (most notably AKBingo!, AKB48 Nemousu TV (AKB48ネ申テレビ), Shukan AKB48 (週刊AKB), AKB to ××!, SKE48 Ebisho!, or SKE48 EbiCalcio), Miyazawa is also frequently appearing in Japanese variety shows. The following non-exhaustive list includes shows she recurrently appeared in and otherwise notable shows, both as a Tarento or representing the group.

Year	Title	Station
2010	G.I. Goro (G．I．ゴロー)	TBS
2010	Quiz! Hexagon II	Fuji TV
2010	DERO!	Nippon TV
2011, 2015	Mecha-Mecha Iketeru!	Fuji TV
2011	SMAPxSMAP	Fuji TV
2011-2012	Waratte Iitomo!	Fuji TV
2011-2012	Bakushō! Dai-Nippon Akan Keisatsu (爆笑！大日本アカン警察)	Fuji TV
2012	Namauma	Fuji TV
2012	Tosochu - Run for money!	Fuji TV
2013	NEP league	Fuji TV
2013	Sekai no Mura de Hakken! Konna Tokoro ni Nihonjin	TV Asahi
2013 - 2014	Umazuki! (うまズキッ)	Fuji TV
2014	Shumi no engei ya sai no jikan	NHK Educational TV
2015	Wagamama! Kimama! Tabi kibun	Fuji TV
2013, 2016	Shibuya Deep A!	NHK
2016	Hirunandesu!	Nippon TV
2016	Rôkaru rosen basu noritsugi no tabi.	TV Tokyo

== Radio ==
Year	Title	Role
2007-	ON8 "Hashira Night! with AKB48! (ON8「柱NIGHT! with AKB48」)	Self
2007-	AKB48 Asu made mou chotto. (AKB48 明日までもうちょっと。)	Self
2010-	AKB48 no Allnight Nippon	Self
2010–2013	Listen (Live 4 Life)	Self (Solo MC in June & November 2010, double MC in April 2013)
2010–	AKB48 Akimoto Sayaka·Miyazawa Sae no Ukkari Channel	Self (co-hostess)
2011	AKB48 no "Watashi tachi no Monogatari"	Self
2012–2013	ViVADiVA	Self (co-hostess)

== Other stage performances ==
Year	Title	Role
2009	AKB48 Kagekidan "Infinity" (AKB歌劇団「∞・Infinity」)	Ruka Murasame (村雨ルカ) (Leading actress, double cast with Sayaka Akimoto)
2010	Space Wars Replay (スペース・ウォーズ再演)	
2011	Double Heroine (スーパーLIVEショー「ダブルヒロイン」)	Asuka Mizutani
2013	Wings of Kuzariana (クザリアーナの翼)	Koruri
2014	AKB49 Ren'ai kinshi jōrei (AKB49〜恋愛禁止条例)	Minoru Urayama (Leading male role)
2016	Crest of the Royal Family (王家の紋章, Ōke no Monshō)	Carol (Leading female role)
2017 (8 April to 31 May)	Crest of the Royal Family Replay (王家の紋章再演, Ōke no Monshō)	Carol (Leading female role)
2017 (24 July to 3 August)	Peter Pan (ピーター・パン)	Tiger Lily
2017 (29 September to 8 October)	TOKYO TRIBE (TOKYO TRIBE)	Sunmi
2017 (27 November to 20 December)	YUMING x Imperial Threater Vol. 3 Asahi no Naka de Hohoende (ユーミン×帝劇 vol.3 朝陽の中で微笑んで)	Sara Kitaoka 北岡紗良 (Leading female role) / Emi（恵美）
2018 (March to May)	ZEROTOPIA	Sandy
2019 (22 July to August)	Peter Pan (ピーター・パン)	Tiger Lily
2020	West Side Story	Anita
2021 (March to April)	You're a Good Man Charlie Brown (きみはいい人、チャーリー・ブラウン)	Lucy Van Pelt
2021 (22 July to 1 August)	Peter Pan (ピーター・パン)	Tiger Lily
2023	She Loves Me	Ilona Ritter

== Bibliography ==
=== Magazines ===
- Samurai ELO, Inforest (January 2011-December 2013)

=== Photobooks ===
- Kanojo (Kodansha, 21 August 2009) ISBN 9784062156967
- Namida no Yukue (Wani Books, 16 February 2015) ISBN 9784847046889
