= Chocolove from AKB48 =

Japanese idol group

- Origin: Akihabara, Tokyo, Japan
- Genres: J-pop
- Years active: 2007
- Labels: DefSTAR, Universal Music Japan
- Spinoff of: AKB48
- Members: Rina Nakanishi; Sayaka Akimoto; Sae Miyazawa
- Website: www.universal-music.co.jp/chocolove/

Chocolove from AKB48 was a sub-unit consisting of three members from the idol group AKB48. It is the fourth unit under AKB48, and the first to release more than one single.

The group's debut single "Ashita wa Ashita no Kimi ga Umareru", which served as the ending theme for the anime adaptation of Skull Man, reached number 18 on the Oricon's Weekly Single Charts, and charted for three weeks in 2007. Their second single "Mail no Namida" reached number 29 and charted for two weeks.

== Members ==
- Rina Nakanishi (Team A)
- Sayaka Akimoto (Team K)
- Sae Miyazawa (Team K)

== Singles ==
#	Title	Release date	First week sales	Total sales
1	"Ashita wa Ashita no Kimi ga Umareru" (明日は明日の君が生まれる)	June 6, 2007	8,133	9,444
2	"Mail no Namida" (メールの涙, Mēru no Namida)	August 29, 2007	5,182	5,182

== Albums ==
#	Title	Release date	First week sales	Total sales
1	Dessert	November 21, 2007	-	-

== Sources ==
- About Chocolove from AKB48
