= Ao Oni (film) =

- Theatrical release poster
- Directed by: Daisuke Nibayashi
- Screenplay by: Noriko Kozuru
- Story by: noprops
- Based on: Ao Oni by noprops
- Produced by: Tasuke Iizuka; Kit Matsumura; Yasuhiro Ebinauma; Abe Masaki
- Starring: Anna Iriyama; Kenta Suga; Sho Jinnai; Seiya; Seika Furuhata; Riku Ozeki
- Cinematography: Akihisa Minami
- Edited by: Shinichi Suzuki
- Music by: Shunsuke Kida
- Production company: Digital Frontier
- Distributed by: AMG Entertainment
- Release date: 5 July 2014 (Japan)
- Running time: 70 minutes
- Country: Japan
- Language: Japanese

Ao Oni (青鬼; lit. 'Blue Demon') is a 2014 Japanese horror film based on the 2008 video game of the same name. The film was released on July 5, 2014, in Japan.

== Plot ==
A boy named Naoki is killed in a traffic accident. Anna, his sister, sees a boy named Shun being bullied by Takuro and his friends when she goes to place flowers at his grave.

Takuro, Shun, Mika, Takeshi, and Hiroshi decide to investigate an empty house. Takuro enters the house with his stuff, and the rest follow. Anna enters behind them. As they all enter, the door is locked and cannot be reopened.

The group receive frightening phone calls. Takeshi becomes paranoid and starts running around the house to hide. Shun and Anna try to find a way out. Frightening things happen to the group and they begin to panic. Takeshi seems fearful of Takuro. Hiroshi and Mika go together to check around the house. Meanwhile, Takeshi gets grabbed by a giant blue hand. The group hears Takeshi's scream and rush back to see him dragged backwards into the room. When the group enters, they find Takeshi's dismembered body. Mika tries to escape but is killed by the Ao Oni.

The others solve puzzles to try and escape as they are pursued by the Ao Oni. Anna tells the others how she believes her brother's death was not suicide but murder.

As they reach the basement, they find that Takuro has already opened it. As they go down, Takuro knocks Hiroshi, out. Anna confronts Takuro about killing her brother, which he denies doing. When Anna mentions Shun's name, he gets annoyed. Shun reaches for the box Takuro carried and opens it, revealing Shun's own lifeless body inside.

Shun then realizes that he has been dead the whole time and only Anna can see him. Takuro hit Shun in the head, killing him. Takuro went to the empty house to hide Shun's body. Shun is stunned by the truth and finally disappears as Anna apologizes to him.

Takuro plans on killing Anna since she knows too much, but is suddenly caught by the Ao Oni. Anna wakes Hiroshi up, and they both flee. The Ao Oni chases after them. Hiroshi asks Anna to leave him behind and he’s killed as she runs ahead. Anna hears Shun's voice and follows him through a lighted doorway. The movie ends with Shun and Anna at the riverbank.

== Cast ==
- Anna Iriyama as Anna
- Kenta Suga as Shun
- Seika Furuhata as Mika
- Sho Jinnai as Takuro
- Seiya as Hiroshi
- Riku Ozeki as Takeshi

== Release ==
=== Marketing ===
The film's distributor, AMG Entertainment, revealed the film's poster and official images of its titular monster on 11 June 2014.

=== Theatrical run ===
Ao Oni was released theatrically in Japan on 5 July 2014. During its run that month, a limited number of commemorative Ao Oni-themed greeting cards were given to cinemagoers.

== Sequel ==
In 2015, another live-action Ao Oni film, titled Ao Oni ver2.0, was released, although it was not a sequel. It starred the same six students characters, but played by different actors. As well as Ao Oni, this time the film also utilized the character "Blockman" (in the Japanese original, "Fuwatty") from the video game.

== See also ==
- List of films based on video games
