= Rina Kawaei =

Japanese actress (born 1995)

- 川栄 李奈
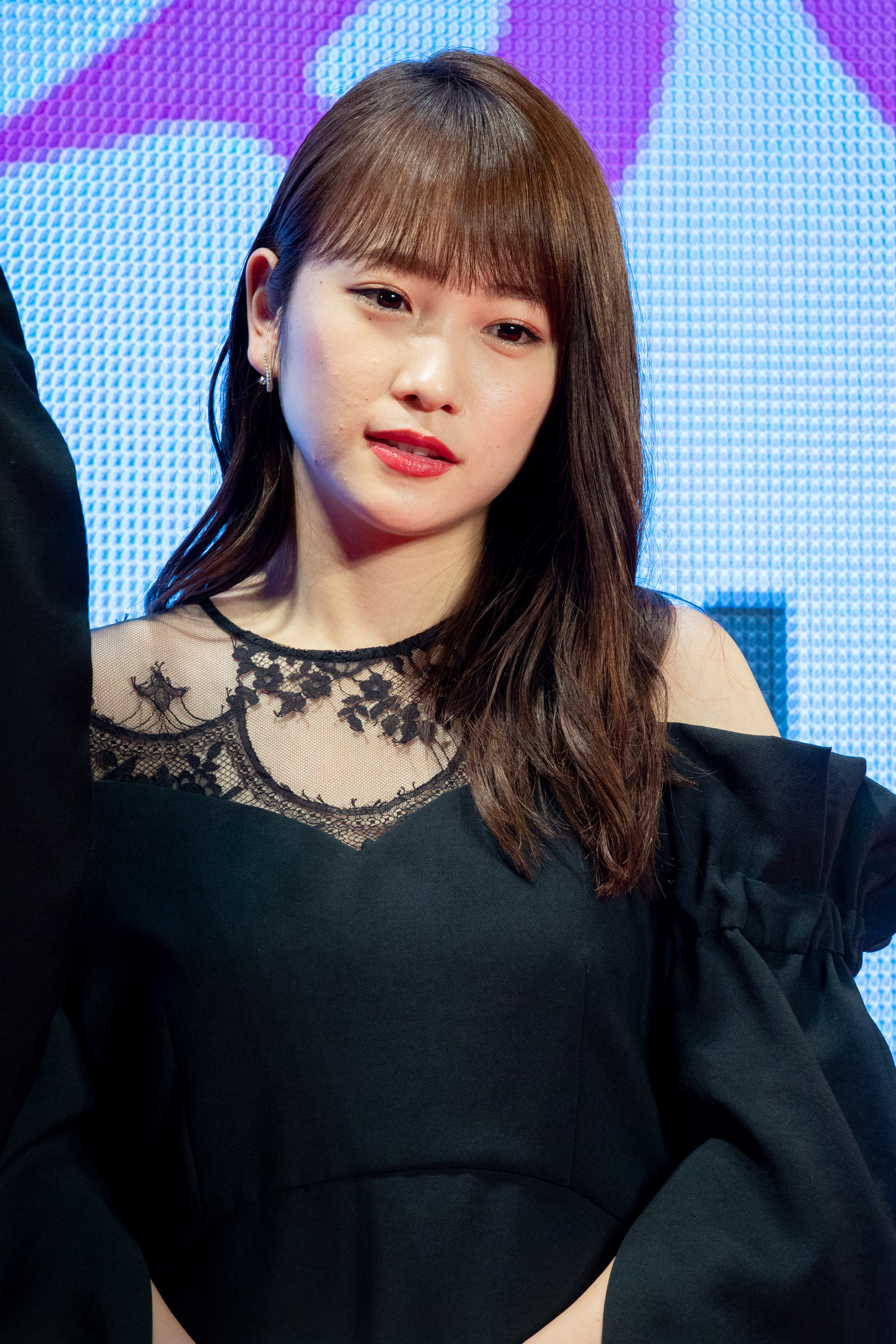
- Kawaei in October 2018
- Born: Rina Kawaei (川栄 李奈); February 12, 1995 (age 31); Kanagawa Prefecture, Japan
- Occupation: Actress
- Years active: 2010–present
- Spouse: Tomoki Hirose (m. 2019; div. 2026)
- Children: 2
- Musical career
- Genre: J-pop
- Instrument: Vocals
- Years active: 2010–2015
- Formerly of: AKB48; Anrire
- Website: Official website

Rina Kawaei (川栄 李奈, Kawaei Rina; born February 12, 1995) is a Japanese actress and former singer, represented by Avex. She is a former member of the girl group AKB48. As an actress, she has starred in television series such as Come Come Everybody (2021) and was nominated for Best Supporting Actress at the 61st Blue Ribbon Awards in 2019.

== Career ==
=== 2012–2014 ===
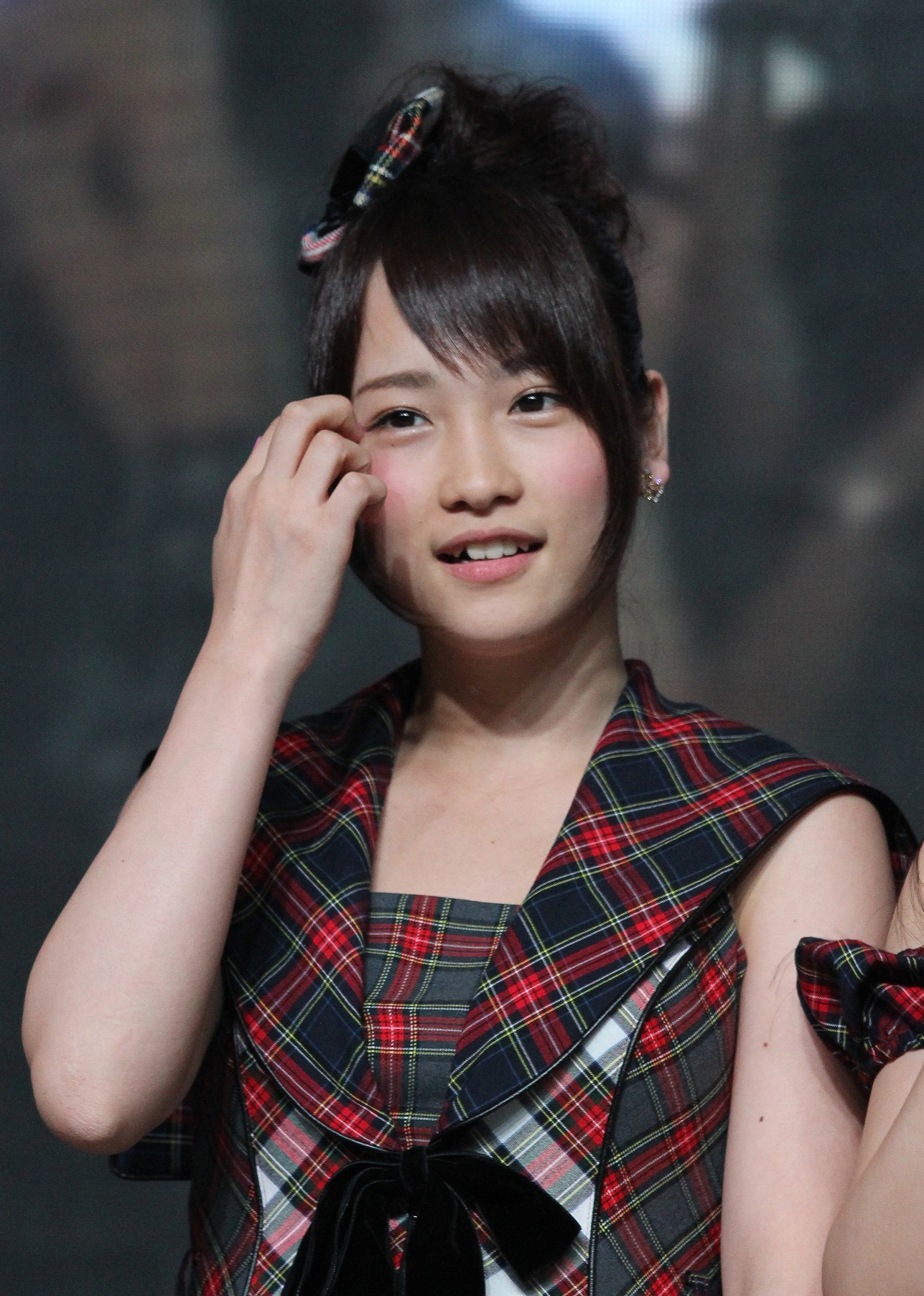
Kawaei at the Singapore Meet & Greet 2 Performance in April 2013

Kawaei auditioned for AKB48 and was selected to join the 11th generation as a kenkyūsei (trainee) in July 2010.

In March 2012, she was promoted to Team 4, and was transferred to Team A in August. Soon after the TV series Shiritsu Bakaleya Kōkō ended on June 30, it was announced that Kawaei would participate in its film adaptation. It would star several members from the groups Johnny's Jr. and AKB48.

Kawaei was a member of the AKB48 subunit Anrire with Anna Iriyama and Rena Katō. They appeared in Rino Sashihara's 2012 single "Ikujinashi Masquerade", which charted at number one in the Japanese Oricon weekly singles chart.

In 2013, during a broadcast of a special episode of the comedy show Mecha-Mecha Iketeru!, it was announced that Kawaei would perform as center in a song of the special unit BKA48 that will be included on AKB48's single "Sayonara Crawl" to be released in May. At the 2013 AKB48 general election, she placed 25th with 26,764 votes, and thus gained a place as an Under Girl for the next single "Koi Suru Fortune Cookie".

==== Attack ====
On May 25, 2014, during an event held at the Iwate Industry Culture & Convention Center in Takizawa, Iwate, she, along with Anna Iriyama and a staff member were attacked by a 24-year-old man wielding a handsaw, who was arrested at the scene on suspicion of attempted murder. All three victims suffered wounds including bone fractures on their fingers (reportedly, Kawaei's right thumb and Iriyama's right little finger were both fractured and cut, and the girls suffered wounds on their heads), and were taken to a hospital for surgery. The event, as well as all other group activities on that day, were halted.

=== 2014–present ===
At AKB48's 2014 general election she placed 16th with 39,120 votes and thus gained a place in the promotional line-up for the next single "Kokoro no Placard".

On March 26, 2015, Kawaei announced that she would leave AKB48 and transition to acting, citing her inability to participate in handshake events after the handsaw assault as the reason. She had her graduation ceremony during AKB48's Summer Concert in Saitama Super Arena on August 2 and had her last stage performance on August 4, 2015. In November 2015, it was announced that she would star with Mitsuki Takahata in the NHK morning drama Toto Neechan.

She made her debut voice role in the anime film PriPara Minna no Akogare Let's Go PriPari (プリパラ み～んなのあこがれ♪レッツゴー☆プリパリ), voicing Minifalulu, the younger sister of Falulu.

== Personal life ==
Kawaei married actor Tomoki Hirose in 2019. The couple have two children, born in November 2019 and June 2023. On April 10, 2026, Kawaei announced through an Instagram post that she had finalized her divorce from Hirose, which confirmed media reports speculating their separation earlier that month. Hirose also made a similar statement and that the two promised to co-parent their two children.

== Discography ==
=== Singles with AKB48 ===
Year	No.	Title	Role	Notes
2011	20	"Sakura no Ki ni Narō"	Team Kenkyūsei	Did not sing on title track. Sang on "Ōgon Center" with Team Kenkyūsei. First appearance on an AKB48 single.
2011	21	"Everyday, Katyusha"	Team Kenkyūsei	Did not sing on title track. Sang on "Anti" with Team Kenkyūsei.
2011	23	"Kaze wa Fuiteiru"	Team 4+Kenkyūsei	Did not sing on title track. Sang on "Tsubomitachi" as Team4+Kenkyūsei
2012	25	"Give Me Five!"	Special Girls A	Did not sing on title track. Sang "New Ship" with Special Girls A. Sang in chorus with Baby Blossom.
2012	26	"Manatsu no Sounds Good!"	A-side	First appearance on title track. She is now part of Team 4.
2012	27	"Gingham Check"	Waiting Girls	Did not place in 2012 General Election. Did not sing on title track. She sang on "Ano Hi no Furin" with the Waiting Girls.
2012	28	"Uza"	Under Girls	Sang on "Tsugi no Season" and "Kodoku na Hoshizora". Moved to New Team A.
2012	29	"Eien Pressure"	B-side, OKL48	Did not sing on title track; lineup was determined by rock-paper-scissors tournament. Sang on "Totteoki Christmas". Sang on "Eien Yori Tsuzuku Yō ni" as part of OKL48.
2013	30	"So Long!"	Under Girls	Sang on "Waiting Room". Also sang on "Ruby" as Team A.
2013	31	"Sayonara Crawl"	A-side	Also sang on "Ikiru Koto" as Team A, and "Hasute to Wasute" as BKA48.
2013	32	"Koi Suru Fortune Cookie"	Under Girls	Ranked 25th in 2013 General Election. Sang on "Ai no Imi wo Kangaete Mita".
2013	33	"Heart Electric"	A-side	Sang on title track with English name "Kawaey"
2013	34	"Suzukake no Ki no Michi de "Kimi no Hohoemi o Yume ni Miru" to Itte Shimattara Bokutachi no Kankei wa Dō Kawatte Shimau no ka, Bokunari ni Nan-nichi ka Kangaeta Ue de no Yaya Kihazukashii Ketsuron no Yō na Mono"	B-side	Did not sing on title track; lineup was determined by rock-paper-scissors tournament. Sang on "Mosh & Dive". Sang on "Party is Over".
2014	35	"Mae shika Mukanee"	A-side	
2014	36	"Labrador Retriever"	A-side	
2014	37	"Kokoro no Placard"	A-side	Ranked 16th in 2014 General Election. Also sang on "Oshiete Mommy".
2014	38	"Kibouteki Refrain"	A-side	
2015	39	"Green Flash"	A-side	Also sang "Majisuka Fight" and "Haru no Hikari Chikadzuita Natsu"
2015	40	"Bokutachi wa Tatakawanai"	A-side	Last Single in AKB48. Also sang "Kimi no Dai-ni shou" which was also her graduation song.
2015	41	"Halloween Night"	B-side	Did not sing on title track. Sang on "Yankee Machine Gun" as a graduated member.

==== With Anrire ====
- "Ikujinashi Masquerade" (2012) – Rino Sashihara and Anrire

=== Other AKB48 songs ===
- Sugar Rush (2012)

== Stage units ==
Team Kenkyūsei "Theater no Megami"

1. "Hatsukoi yo, Konnichiwa" (初恋よ こんにちは)

Team 4 1st Stage "Boku no Taiyou"

1. "Higurashi no Koi" (ヒグラシノコイ)

Team A Waiting Stage

1. "Skirt, Hirari" (スカート、ひらり)
2. "Tenshi no Shippo" (天使のしっぽ)

== Filmography ==
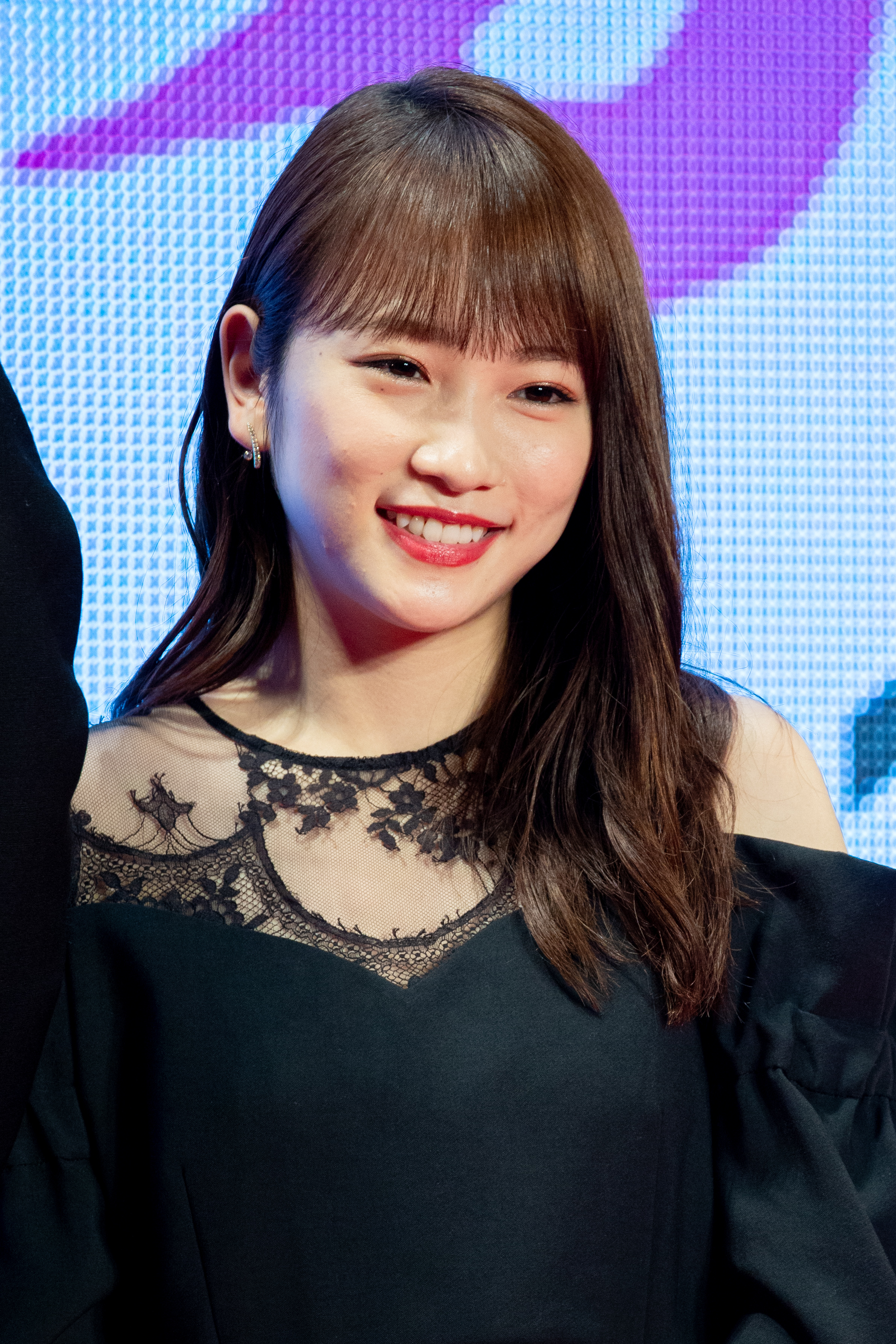
Kawaei at the 31st Tokyo International Film Festival in October 2018

=== Anime ===
- Kaijū Sekai Seifuku (2025) as Kaijū's owner

=== Films ===
- Gekijōban Shiritsu Bakaleya Kōkō (October 13, 2012)
- PriPara Mi~nna no Akogare Let's Go PriPari (2016) as Mini-Falulu
- Death Note: Light Up the New World (2016) as Sakura Aoi
- Ajin: Demi-Human (2017) as Izumi Shimomura
- The Lies She Loved (2018) as Kokoha
- Koi no Shizuku (2018) as Shiori Tachibana
- Principal (2018) as Haruka Kunishige
- My Teacher, My Love (2018) as Aoi Nakamura
- Pokémon the Movie: The Power of Us (2018) as Risa (voice)
- The House Where the Mermaid Sleeps (2018)
- Don't Cry, Mr. Ogre (2019) as Yukino
- Until I Meet September's Love (2019)
- Diner (2019)
- Ride Your Wave (2019) as Hinako Mukaimizu (voice)
- Step (2020)
- Jigoku no Hanazono: Office Royale (2021)
- Summer Ghost (2021) as Ayane Satō (voice)
- The Floor Plan (2024) as Yuzuki
- Dear Family (2024) as Nami Tsuboi
- Angry Squad: The Civil Servant and the Seven Swindler (2024) as Sakura Mochizuki
- Ryuji (2026) as Mariko

=== TV dramas ===
- Majisuka Gakuen 2 (2011) as Rina
- Majisuka Gakuen 3 (2012) as Nanashi
- Shark (2014) as Kaede Konno
- Sailor Zombie (2014) as Momoka Takizawa
- Gomen ne Seishun as Ai Jinbo
- Majisuka Gakuen 4 (2015) as Bakamono
- Majisuka Gakuen 5 (2015) as Bakamono
- Tokyo Sentimental (2016) (ep.3, guest appearance)
- Toto Neechan (2016) as Tomie Morita
- Death Cash (2016) as Shi Hei
- Hayako Sensei, Kekkon Surutte Honto Desu Ka? (2016) as Fuko Moriyama
- Koe Koi (2016) as Kaori Takashima (guest appearance)
- Death Note: New Generation (2016) as Sakura Aoi
- Frankenstein's Love (2017) as Mikoto
- Fugitive Boys (2017) as Koyoi Niizato
- Idaten (2019) as Chie
- Mr. Hiiragi's Homeroom (2019)
- Reach Beyond the Blue Sky (2021) as Ichijō Mikako
- Shitteru Waifu (2021) as Kenzaki Nagisa
- Come Come Everybody (2021) as Hinata
- Grass for My Pillow (2026), Yoko Hamada

=== Japanese dub ===
- Kubo and the Two Strings (2017) as The Sisters
- Soul (2020) as 22

=== TV variety shows ===
- Ariyoshi AKB Kyōwakoku (有吉AKB共和国) (TBS)
- Shūkan AKB (週刊AKB) (TV Tokyo)
- AKB48 Nemōsu TV (AKB48ネ申テレビ) (Family Gekijō)
- AKB48 to Chome Chome! (AKBと××!) (April 19, 2012, Yomiuri TV)
- AKBingo! (June 27, 2012, TV Tokyo)
- Bimyō na Tobira AKB 48 no Gachichare (びみょ〜な扉 AKB48のガチチャレ) (October 12, 2012, Hikari TV Channel)

== Awards and nominations ==
Year	Award	Category	Work(s)	Result	Refs
2019	61st Blue Ribbon Awards	Best Supporting Actress	The House Where the Mermaid Sleeps	Nominated	
