= Sayonara Crawl =

- Type-A single cover

Single by AKB48

from the album Tsugi no Ashiato
- B-side: "Bara no Kajitsu"; "Ikiru Koto" (Type A); "How Come?" (Type K); "Romance Kenjū" (Type B); "Hasute to Wasute" (Type B); "Love Shugyō" (Theater Edition)
- Released: May 22, 2013 (Japan)
- Genre: J-pop
- Label: You, Be Cool! / King
- Producer: Yasushi Akimoto

AKB48 singles chronology
"So Long!" (2013)	"Sayonara Crawl" (2013)	"Koisuru Fortune Cookie" (2013)

Music videos
- "Sayonara Crawl" (watch) on YouTube
- "Bara no Kajitsu" (watch) on YouTube
- "Ikiru Koto" (watch) on YouTube
- "How Come?" (watch) on YouTube
- "Romance Kenjū" (watch) on YouTube
- "Hasute to Wasute" (watch) on YouTube
- "Love Shugyō" (watch) on YouTube

"Sayonara Crawl" (さよならクロール, Sayonara Kurōru; "Goodbye Crawl") is the 31st single by the Japanese idol girl group AKB48; it was released in Japan on May 22, 2013.

As of the release day, the CD single "Sayonara Crawl" had been shipped in 2.3 million copies, besting the group's previous record of 2.0 million from "Manatsu no Sounds Good!". As of June 16, 2013, over 1.9 million copies have been sold.

On 21 March 2022, Thai version of "Sayonara Crawl" has been sung by the combination members of BNK48 and CGM48.

== Release ==
The single was released in the form of several different editions: 3 generally distributed editions titled Type A, Type K, and Type B and Theater Edition to be sold at the AKB48 Theater.

There are also limited editions of Types A, K, and B. All editions contained a voting card for the AKB48 2013 General Election to determine the lineup for the group's 32nd single.

The release marks the first time the group has presented a “quadruple center” lineup for the title track. The centers are: Tomomi Itano, Yuko Oshima, Haruka Shimazaki and Mayu Watanabe.

This is also the first time where Tomomi Itano performed as the center in AKB48 Single, but this time, in a Quadruple Center Format. This is the last single to feature members Sayaka Akimoto, Natsumi Matsubara, Tomomi Nakatsuka, Mika Komori, and Shiori Nakamata.

== Track listing ==
The first 2 songs on the CD and the first 3 music videos on the DVD are the same for all versions.

=== Type A ===
CD
No.	Title	Artist(s)	Length
1.	"Sayonara Crawl" (さよならクロール)		4:57
2.	"Bara no Kajitsu" (バラの果実)	Under Girls (アンダーガールズ)	4:29
3.	"Ikiru Koto" (イキルコト)	Team A	3:59
4.	"Sayonara Crawl (instrumental)" (さよならクロール off vocal ver.)		4:56
5.	"Bara no Kajitsu (instrumental)" (バラの果実 off vocal ver.)		4:28
6.	"Ikiru Koto (instrumental)" (イキルコト off vocal ver.)		3:58

DVD
No.	Title	Length
1.	"Sayonara Crawl (music video)" (さよならクロール Music Video)
2.	"Sayonara Crawl (music video "swimsuit ver.")" (さよならクロール Music Video 〜水着ver.〜)
3.	"Bara no Kajitsu (music video)" (バラの果実 Music Video)
4.	"Ikiru Koto (music video)" (イキルコト Music Video)
5.	"Making of "Sayonara Crawl" music video (part I)" (Making of さよならクロール Music Video（前編）)
6.	"Bonus Type A Tekken Para Para Manga "So Long!" (特典映像 Type A『鉄拳パラパラ漫画 〜So long !〜』)

=== Type K ===
CD
No.	Title	Artist(s)	Length
3.	"How Come?" (How come ?)	Team K	4:10
6.	"How Come? (instrumental)" (How come ? off vocal ver.)		4:08

DVD
No.	Title	Length
4.	"How Come? (music video)" (How come ? Music Video)
5.	"Making of "Sayonara Crawl" music video (part II)" (Making of さよならクロール Music Video（前編）)
6.	"Bonus Type K Tekken Para Para Manga "Yume no Kawa"" (特典映像 Type K『鉄拳パラパラ漫画 〜夢の河〜』)

=== Type B ===
CD
No.	Title	Artist(s)	Length
3.	"Romance Kenjū" (ロマンス拳銃 Romansu Kenjū)	Team B	3:50
4.	"Hasute to Wasute" (ハステとワステ "Haste and Waste")	BKA48	4:07
7.	"Romance Kenjū (instrumental)" (ロマンス拳銃 off vocal ver.)		3:50
8.	"Hasute to Wasute (instrumental)" (ハステとワステ off vocal ver.)		4:04

DVD
No.	Title	Length
4.	"Romance Kenjū (music video)" (ロマンス拳銃 Music Video)
5.	"Bonus Type B Tekken Para Para Manga "First Rabbit"" (特典映像 Type B『鉄拳パラパラ漫画 〜ファースト・ラビット〜』)

=== Theater Edition ===
CD
No.	Title	Artist(s)	Length
3.	"Love Shugyō" (LOVE修行 Rabu Shugyō)	Kenkyūsei	4:43
6.	"Love Shugyō (instrumental)" (LOVE修行 off vocal ver.)		4:41

== Members ==
=== "Sayonara Crawl" ===
Center: Mayu Watanabe, Tomomi Itano, Yuko Oshima, Haruka Shimazaki

- Team A: Anna Iriyama, Rina Kawaei, Ayaka Kikuchi, Mariko Shinoda, Minami Takahashi, Yui Yokoyama, Mayu Watanabe
- Team K: Maria Abe, Tomomi Itano, Yūko Ōshima, Rie Kitahara, Mariya Nagao
- Team B: Yuki Kashiwagi, Rena Katō, Haruna Kojima, Haruka Shimazaki, Reina Fujie
- SKE48 Team S / Team K: Jurina Matsui
- SKE48 Team S: Yuria Kizaki, Rena Matsui
- SKE48 Team E: Kanon Kimoto
- NMB48 Team N / AKB48 Team B: Miyuki Watanabe
- NMB48 Team M / AKB48 Team A: Fūko Yagura
- NMB48 Team N: Nana Yamada, Sayaka Yamamoto
- HKT48 Team H / AKB48 Team A: Haruka Kodama
- HKT48 Team H: Rino Sashihara, Sakura Miyawaki
- HKT48 Kenkyuusei: Meru Tashima, Mio Tomonaga
- JKT48 Team J / AKB48 Team B: Aki Takajō
- SNH48 / AKB48 Team K: Sae Miyazawa

=== "Bara no Kajitsu" ===
Center: Natsuki Kojima, Nana Okada, Mako Kojima

- Team A: Karen Iwata, Ryoka Oshima, Juri Takahashi, Yuka Tano
- Team K: Tomu Muto
- Team B: Natsuki Kojima
- Kenkyuusei: Nana Okada, Mako Kojima
- SKE48 Team KII: Manatsu Mukaida
- SKE48 Team E: Nao Furuhata
- NMB48 Team N: Akari Yoshida
- NMB48 Team M: Keira Yogi
- HKT48 Team H: Natsumi Matsuoka, Madoka Moriyasu
- HKT48 Kenkyuusei: Marika Tani

=== "Ikiru Koto" ===
Center: Minami Takahashi, Mayu Watanabe

- Team A: Anna Iriyama, Karen Iwata, Rina Izuta, Ryoka Oshima, Rina Kawaei, Ayaka Kikuchi, Marina Kobayashi, Riho Kotani, Sumire Sato, Mariko Shinoda, Juri Takahashi, Minami Takahashi, Yūka Tano, Shiori Nakamata (Last Single), Tomomi Nakatsuka (Last Single), Sakiko Matsui, Ayaka Morikawa, Yui Yokoyama, Mayu Watanabe

=== "How Come?" ===
Center: Tomomi Itano, Yuko Oshima, Jurina Matsui

- Team K: Maria Abe, Sayaka Akimoto (Last Single), Tomomi Itano, Mayumi Uchida, Yuko Oshima, Rie Kitahara, Asuka Kuramochi, Kana Kobayashi, Amina Sato, Shihori Suzuki, Haruka Shimada, Rina Chikano, Chisato Nakata, Mariya Nagao, Nana Fujita, Ami Maeda, Jurina Matsui, Natsumi Matsubara (Last Single), Miho Miyazaki, Tomu Muto

=== "Romance Kenjū" ===
Center: Yuki Kashiwagi, Haruka Shimazaki

- Team B: Anna Ishida, Haruka Ishida, Miori Ichikawa, Misaki Iwasa, Ayaka Umeda, Mina Ōba, Shizuka Ōya, Yuki Kashiwagi, Haruka Katayama, Rena Kato, Natsuki Kojima, Haruna Kojima, Mika Komori (Last Single), Haruka Shimazaki, Miyu Takeuchi, Miku Tanabe, Mariko Nakamura, Wakana Natori, Misato Nonaka, Reina Fujie, Suzuran Yamauchi, Miyuki Watanabe

=== "Hasute to Wasute" ===
Center: Rina Kawaei

- Team A: Rina Kawaei, Minami Takahashi
- Team B: Yuki Kashiwagi, Haruna Kojima, Haruka Shimazaki
- AKB48 Kenkyuusei: Minami Minegishi
- HKT48 Team H: Rino Sashihara

Note: This song is the result of a special episode of Mecha-Mecha Iketeru!, in which fifteen members of AKB48 participated in a surprise end-of-term exam to determine the "Center Baka" (センターバカ; Idiot Center). The seven members who ranked in the lower half of the class were named the "Baka 7" (バカ7; Seven Idiots), with Kawaei Rina becoming the "Center Baka" for placing last and performs with a harness on, with 'Hasute' and 'Wasute'. The title of the song comes from "Hasute to wasute ga nakayoku tsukutta" (ハステとワステが仲良く作った; "Haste and Waste made friends"), which was Kawaei's answer for translating "Haste makes waste" into Japanese. The title of the song is based on one of the answers Kawaei Rina gave in her test. The question was to translate the English phrase "Haste makes waste" into Japanese. Kawaei gave the answer ハステとワステが仲良く作った (Hasute and Wasute made friendly together), believing Haste and waste to be names. Listed in parentheses are each member's test rankings.

The performing members consist of the "Baka 7", the members with the lowest scores on a test on Japanese, maths, general knowledge, science and English, taken on the 'Mechaike Bakajo Test' dokkiri special. The ranking from lowest to highest was: Baka 7: Kawaei Rina (239), Takahashi Minami (259), Kojima Haruna (261), Shimazaki Haruka (278), Minegishi Minami (288), Sashihara Rino (293), Kashiwagi Yuki (323)

=== "Love Shugyō" ===
Center: Mako Kojima

- AKB48 Kenkyuusei: Moe Aigasa, Saho Iwatate, Natsuki Uchiyama, Ayano Umeta, Miyū Ōmori, Ayaka Okada, Nana Okada, Saki Kitazawa, Mako Kojima, Yukari Sasaki, Ayana Shinozaki, Yurina Takashima, Miki Nishino, Hikari Hashimoto, Rina Hirata, Mitsuki Maeda, Minami Minegishi, Yuiri Murayama, Shinobu Mogi

== Charts ==
=== Billboard charts ===
Billboard weekly chart
Chart (2013)	Peak position
Japan (Billboard Japan Hot 100)	1

=== Oricon charts ===
Release	Oricon Singles Chart	Peak position	Debut sales (copies)	Sales total (copies)
May 22, 2013	Daily Chart	1	1,450,881	1,933,500 (Note: Oricon sales figures are from the first four weeks on Chart as logged from http://stage48.net/wiki/index.php/Sayonara_Crawl. Exact sales figures are not available as Oricon does not count sales below the top 200; this figure is rounded to the nearest hundred.)
May 22, 2013	Weekly Chart	1	1,762,873	1,933,500
May 22, 2013	Monthly Chart	1	1,871,779	1,933,500

=== G-music (Taiwan) ===
Chart	Peak position
Combo	17

=== Year-end charts ===
Chart (2013)	Position
Billboard Japan Hot 100	2
Billboard Japan Hot Singles Sales	1
Oricon yearly singles	1

== Release history ==
Date	Version	Catalog	Format	Label
May 12, 2013	Type-A	First Press Limited Edition (KIZM-90213~4) Regular Edition (KIZM-213~4)	CD+DVD	King Records
May 12, 2013	Type-K	First Press Limited Edition (KIZM-90215~6) Regular Edition (KIZM-215~6)	CD+DVD	King Records
May 12, 2013	Type-B	First Press Limited Edition (KIZM-90217~8) Regular Edition (KIZM-217~8)	CD+DVD	King Records
May 12, 2013	Theater	Regular Version (NMAX-1150)	CD	King Records
