= Seiya Motoki =

Japanese actor

Seiya Motoki (元木 聖也, Motoki Seiya; born October 6, 1993) is a Japanese actor and tarento represented by LesPros Entertainment. His former stage name was just Seiya (聖也) until December 11, 2015.

== Career ==
Motoki has been active in the entertainment industry since 2009, taking on roles in film, television, and stage productions.

== Personal life ==
Motoki's hobbies are watching DVDs and listening to indie bands. His skills are acrobatics such as parkour and XMA, and swimming. Motoki can also perform the "double corkscrew". His motto is "Kokorozashi Takaku" (High Aspirations). Motoki has a good relationship with The Prince of Tennis Musicals co-star Ryosuke Ikeoka as classmates from high school.

Seiya Motoki
- 元木 聖也
- Born: October 6, 1993 (age 32); Tokyo, Japan
- Other name: Seiya (former stage name)
- Occupations: Actor, tarento
- Years active: 2009–present
- Agent: LesPros Entertainment
- Height: 172 cm (5 ft 8 in)
- Website: Official profile

== Filmography ==
=== Films ===
Year	Title	Role	Notes
2012	The Wings of the Kirin	Shota Kurosawa	
2014	Ao Oni	Hiroshi	

=== Dramas ===
Year	Title	Role	Network	Notes
2012	Kō Kō! Kyonshī Girl: Tokyo Denshidai Senki	Ogasawara	TV Tokyo	Episode 4
2013	Sansuu Deka Zero	Ken Hayami	NHK E	Episode 8
2014	Tokyo Tokkyo Kyoka-kyoku	Kazuhiko Jinnai	NHK E	Episode 4
2015	Seishun Tantei Haruya: Otona no Aku o Yurusanai!	Koji Takagi	YTV	Episode 2
2018	Kaitou Sentai Lupinranger VS Keisatsu Sentai Patranger	Noel Takao / Lupin-X / Patren X	TV Asahi	Episode 20–onwards
2022	Invisible	"MONKEES"	TBS	Episode 4
2025	Masked Ninja Akakage	Akudoji	TV Asahi	

=== Stage ===
Year	Title	Role	Notes
2011	Musical The Prince of Tennis 2nd Season	Kiyosumi Sengoku	
2012	Peacemaker Kurogane	Tetsunosuke Ichimura	Lead role
2012	Butai Basara Dai 1-shō	Hayato	
2013	Kyo Kara Maoh!: Maō Tanjō-hen	Yuri Shibuya	Lead role
2013	Tumbling Vol. 4	Kensuke Domon	
2014	Butai Basara Dai 2-shō		
2015	Kyo Kara Maoh!: Maō Sai Kōrin	Yuri Shibuya	Lead role

=== Variety ===
Regular appearances

Year	Title	Network	Notes
2013	Otōsan to Issho	NHK BS Premium	

Other appearances

Title	Network	Notes
Kyūkyoku no Otoko wa Dareda? Saikyō Sports Danshi Chōjō Kessen	TBS	
Geinō-kai Tokugi-ō Kettei-sen Teppei 2013	Fuji TV	
Cream Quiz Miracle 9	TV Asahi	

=== Advertising ===
Year	Title	Notes
2014	Mac House	

=== Photo books ===
Year	Title	Notes
2011	Seiya	
2013	Hatachi	

=== DVDs ===
Year	Title	Notes
2012	Seiya J. High	
2013	20 Journey	

=== CDs ===
Year	Title	Notes
2012	Taisetsuna Kotoba	

=== Tokusatsu ===
Year	Character	Show	Network	Notes
2018-19	Noel Takao	Kaitou Sentai Lupinranger VS Keisatsu Sentai Patranger	TV-Asahi	
