= Ao Oni =

2004 Japanese role-playing horror game

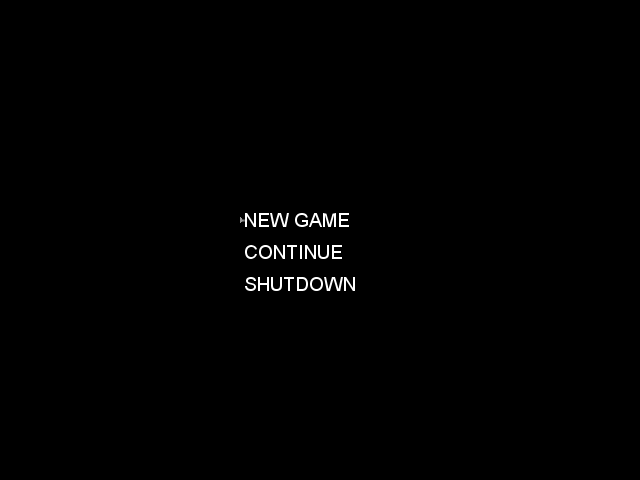
- Title screen
- Developer: noprops
- Publishers: noprops LiTMUS (2024 remaster)
- Engine: RPG Maker XP
- Platform: Microsoft Windows
- Release: 2004
- Genre: Survival Horror

Ao Oni (青鬼; lit. 'Blue Demon'), occasionally spelt as Aooni is a freeware horror game developed by noprops. It was first released in Japan in 2004. The game's plot focuses on a boy named Hiroshi and his friends investigating and becoming trapped in an old mansion said to house a monster, with him having to escape as the monster hunts him down.

Ao Oni gained a cult following in Japan and overseas due to livestreams and playthroughs. Ao Oni has received multiple sequels and spin-offs, and has been adapted into a variety of media, including three feature-length movies, a series of light novels, a manga and an anime series. A remaster was released on Steam and Nintendo Switch in 2024 and on Playstation 5 in 2026.

== Gameplay ==
The in-game sprite for the Ao Oni

The player controls Hiroshi as he explores the locked mansion, gathering items and solving puzzles in order to escape. The oni will begin to chase the player at both random and at certain scripted moments throughout the game.

== Plot ==
A teenage boy named Hiroshi, along with his classmates Takuro, Takeshi, and Mika, investigates a mansion on the outskirts of town that is rumored to house a monster. They discover the Ao Oni, described as a naked, blueberry-colored giant who pursues the group. One by one, each of Hiroshi's classmates dies in the mansion, becoming infected with a virus that transforms them into another oni. Hiroshi continues to explore the mansion, solving puzzles and evading the onis as he seeks a way to escape.

== Development ==
Ao Oni was first developed in 2004 by Japanese indie developer noprops with RPG Maker XP. noprops had developed various puzzle games during and after Ao Oni's development such as Escape from the Haunted Room and White Room. Four versions of the game were released until the game's final release in 2011; these versions differ drastically in terms of plot, map layout and puzzles. A spider-like Oni was planned to be added as an enemy in the third released version, but was scrapped due to difficulty in giving it an natural-looking walk animation.

== Reception and legacy ==
Ao Oni has received mixed-to-positive reviews. Chloi Rad of Indie Statik gave the game a positive review, praising the "solid puzzle design" and the Oni's scare factor, but she criticised the graphics and the story as simplistic, although she said the graphics "[didn't] add or remove anything from the game, really, and [were just] a mere functionality". Italian website Horrormoth gave the game a negative review, but said it would be "nice way to pass the time". Anastasia Wilds of Screen Rant included Ao Oni in her "Top 15 Best RPG Maker Horror Games" list, calling the titular demon "an extremely frightful enemy that is hard to forget and even tougher to beat". Christine Angelica Mendoza of Game Rant ranked the titular demon in second place in the list "8 Strangest Villains In Horror Games", saying "his bizarre appearance makes him a bit more laughable than scary!".

Ao Oni has been dubbed "probably the most famous horror game created with [RPG Maker]". The popularity of Ao Oni revolves around the effectiveness of its horror aspects despite its simplistic nature, with the background music cited as a key contributor to the game's chilling atmosphere used to incite fear. It gained a cult following online in Japan, gaining notoriety through websites such as Niconico and YouTube where Ao Oni-related videos had exceeded 50 million views by 2013. Ao Oni gained international popularity when western YouTubers such as PewDiePie and Markiplier posted playthroughs online. Ao Oni games have collectively culminated over 34 million downloads. Many fangames have also spawned in the wake of the game's popularity.

Ao Oni has been credited for both popularising and influencing horror games made with RPG Maker. Makoto Sanada (known online as Hoshikuzu KRNKRN), creator of Angels of Death and The Forest of Drizzling Rain was inspired to make freeware games after learning of Ao Oni and its success.

=== Adaptations ===
Ao Oni has been adapted into a variety of media, including novels, two live-action films, anime and manga.
