= Just Desserts =

Just Desserts, a pun on just deserts, may refer to:

== Film and television ==
- Just Desserts (film), a 2004 TV film by Kevin Connor
- Top Chef: Just Desserts, an American reality competition TV show 2010–2011
- Zumbo's Just Desserts, an Australian reality competition TV show since 2016

=== Television episodes ===
- "Just Desserts" (Arthur), 2000
- "Just Desserts" (Cory in the House), 2007
- "Just Desserts!" (The Fairly OddParents), 2005
- "Just Desserts" (Lovejoy), 1991
- "Just Desserts" (Orange Is the New Black), 2019
- "Just Desserts" (Perfect Strangers), 1988
- "Just Desserts" (Porridge), 1975
- "Just Desserts" (The Powerpuff Girls), 2000

== Music ==
- Just Desserts, a 2006 album by Brian Hopper and Robert Fenner
- Just Desserts, a 2013 album by the Waitresses
- "Just Desserts", a 2013 song by Charli XCX and Marina
- "Just Desserts", a 2004 song by Chumbawamba from Un

== Other uses ==
- Just Desserts Café, in Toronto, Ontario, Canada; site of the 1994 Just Desserts shooting
- "Just Desserts", a case in the 2008 video game CSI: NY

== See also ==
- Just deserts (disambiguation)
