= Seika Furuhata =

Japanese model and actress

- 古畑 星夏
- Born: July 8, 1996 (age 29); Tokyo, Japan
- Other names: Seika © (セイカ©); Seika (セイカ); Se-chan (せーちゃん)
- Occupations: Model; actress
- Years active: 2009–present
- Agent: LesPros Entertainment
- Height: 1.64 m (5 ft 5 in) (2012)
- Spouse: Unknown (m. 2023; div. 2025)

Seika Furuhata (古畑 星夏, Furuhata Seika; born July 8, 1996, in Tokyo, Japan) is a Japanese actress and model who is represented by LesPros Entertainment. She is an exclusive model for the magazines Seventeen and Nicola.

== Personal ==
Seiya Suzuki is one of her friends. On February 14, 2023, she announced her marriage through her Instagram, but they divorced on December 15, 2025.

== Discography ==
=== Singles ===
Year	Title	Notes
2011	"Niji no Mukō e"	As part of LesPros Hapichari

== Filmography ==
=== Drama ===
Year	Title	Role	Network	Notes	Ref.
2012	Papadol!	Hikaru Arai	TBS		
2013	Pin to Kona	Nanami	TBS		
2013	Hontoni Atta Kowai Hanashi Natsu no Tokubetsu-hen	Hatsumi	Fuji TV		
2014	Kyō wa Kaisha Yasumimasu.	Hirono Meizen	NTV	Episodes 2 to 6	
2015	Mischievous Kiss: Love in Tokyo 2	Rika Irie	Fuji TV	Episode 9	
2015	Ramen Daisuki Koizumi-san	Misa Nakamura	Fuji TV		
2015	Kari Kare	Saya Mochizuki	NHK BS Premium		
2016	Night Hero Naoto	Reina	TV Tokyo	Episode 2	
2016	Furenaba Ochin	Midori Wakabayashi	NHK BS Premium		
2018	Spring Has Come		WOWOW		
2018	Half Blue Sky	Saya Itō	NHK	Asadora	

=== Films ===
Year	Title	Role	Notes	Ref.
2014	1/11 Juuichi-bun no Ichi	Chiyako Kashiwagi		
2014	Ao Oni	Mika		
2014	Close Range Love	Mei Yoshida		
2015	Natsu no Hi, Kimi no Koe	Yuka Morino		
2016	L	Rino		
2017	One Week Friends	Mayu Kondo		
2017	Saki	Hisa Takei		
2017	Gin Tama	Christel Ketsuno		
2017	Tokyo Ghoul	Yoriko Kosaka		
2018	Lenses on Her Heart			
2018	Ao-Natsu	Marika Ōtori		

=== Variety ===
Year	Title	Network	Notes	Ref.
2010	Piramekino G	TV Tokyo		
2013	Mezamashi TV	Fuji TV		
2013	Test no Hanamichi	NHK E TV		
2015	Tsūkai TV Suka to Japan	Fuji TV	Irregular appearances	

== Bibliography ==
=== Magazines ===
Year	Title	Notes	Ref.
2009	Nicola	Exclusive model	
2013	Seventeen	Exclusive model	

=== Mook ===
Year	Title	Notes
2012	Repipi Armario Brand Oshare Book	
