= Yasuda Dai Circus =

Japanese comedy trio

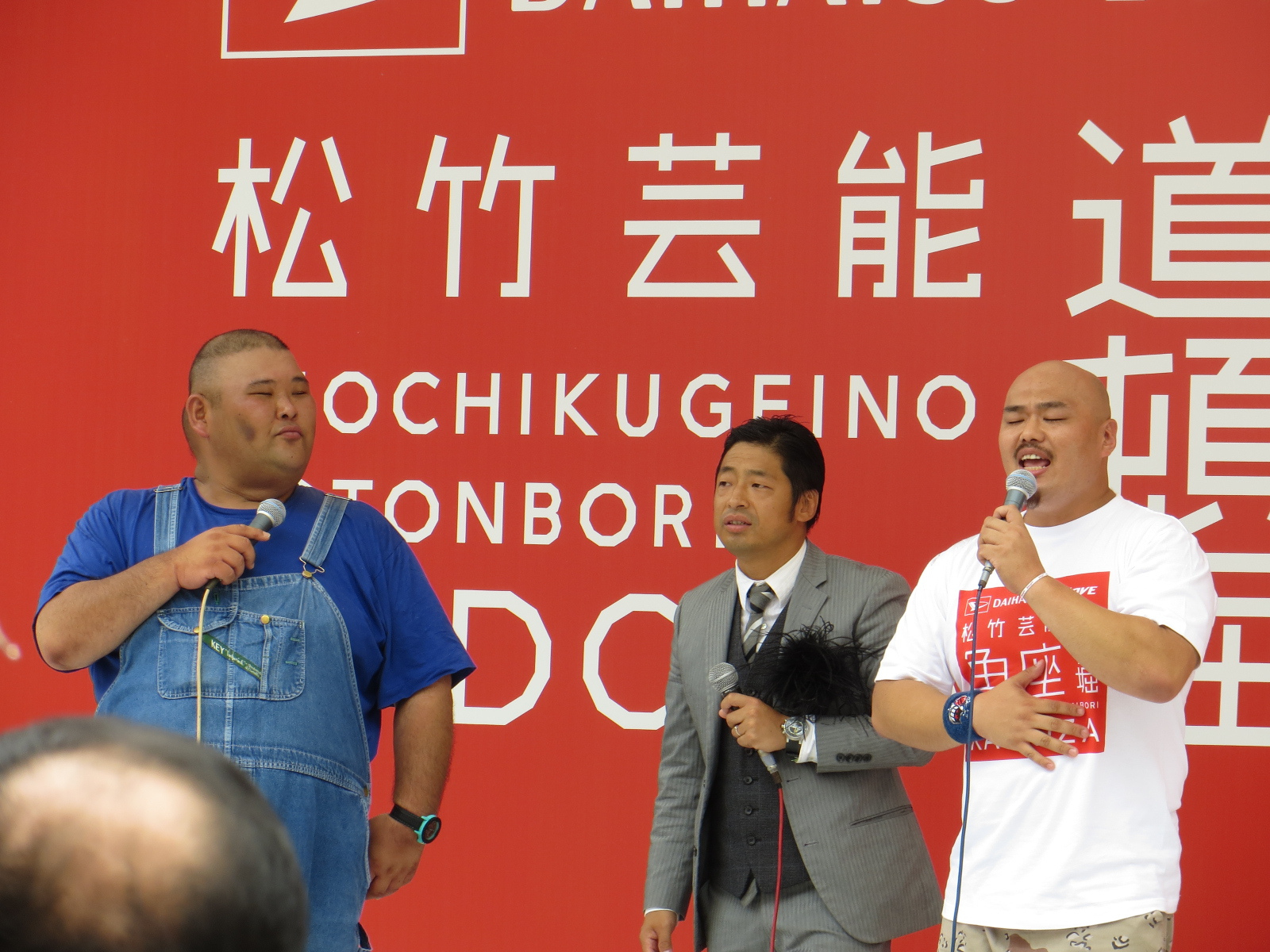
HIRO, Danchō, Kuro-chan (July 2013)

Yasuda Dai Circus (安田大サーカス, Yasuda Dai Sākasu) is a Japanese comedy trio, consisting of Danchō (団長; or sometimes Danchō Yasuda (団長安田)), HIRO, and Kuro-chan (クロちゃん). The three are much less about traditional skit or story based stand-up humor (which is common in Japanese comedy), choosing instead to focus on physical humor and a loud, boisterous style that resonates with most manzai audiences. They formed in 2001, and received their name from owarai kombi Masuda Okada's Kisuke Masuda in parody of the famous "Kinoshita Dai Circus". The group's name simply means "Great Yasuda Circus".

== The characters ==
The group's uniqueness can be attributed to Danchō, HIRO, and Kuro-chan's unconventional characters and strange manner. HIRO stands out as the huge, lumbering mass of the group, and his obesity-related difficulties are often the topic of the group's jokes. Notably, HIRO is said to look like a Japanese taiko when he smiles, and the lump of fatty skin on the back of his neck is often pointed out. As can be expected, he is also known for his large appetite, and is often called upon by variety shows to perform various feats of eating (大食い). In particular he is known for being able to drink a 2-liter bottle of orange fanta in a mere 10 seconds.

As de facto leader of the group, Danchō is probably the least notable character, though he often takes the center stage while performing the groups gags, and is prone to stripping down to his fundoshi (a traditional Japanese loincloth) at the end of every performance. Danchō, who was previously a member of the failed group "Yasuda and Takeuchi", is also generally considered to be the tsukkomi of Yasuda Dai Circus.

Kuro-chan is fairly heavy-set, and has a tough look to him, but looks only go so far as he always speaks in a piercing falsetto. To further boost his image he often adopts feminine mannerisms and acts in a way that is often considered "cute" in Japanese culture. Kuro-chan is prone to lose his temper, as he is often taunted for his voice and odd demeanor, and fits into the traditional owarai role as boke.

== The jokes ==
Though an essential part of their image, the trio's jokes are repetitive and predictable, and much more popular (though almost as predictable) is the ad libbed humour that is interjected between each of their gags. Some of the group's most well-known gags are:

- Dōn, dōn, dōn! Beta-betta! (どーん！どーん！どーん！ベタベッタ). Often chanted after a close-up on HIRO's smiling, sweaty face, this phrase could be said to be the "theme song" of the group. It basically means "Boom, boom, boom! Sweaty sweaty!"; boom being the sound a drum makes, as HIRO's face is said to look like a Japanese taiko when he smiles.
- Dōn, dōn, dōn! Nori-tsukkomi! Daiseikō! (どーん!どーん!どーん! 乗り突っ込み! 大成功!!). This chant, basically meaning "Boom, boom, boom! Self-tsukkomi! Big success!" refers to the way that the group often sets up their own jokes in a very obvious manner; a silly process called nori-tsukkomi. All gags of this type usually end with Danchō marching around with arms straight out signaling a peace sign, while HIRO pumps his fists in the air and Kuro-chan throws confetti.
- Ochi deesu! (オチでーす！). Their short konto (skits) usually end with Danchō's breakaway suit being ripped off, revealing his fundoshi, and all members of the group shout Ochi deesu!, meaning "That's the punchline!".

== Media ==
- In 2008, the Yasuda Dai Circus played Neo Terra's three Executives in Tomica Hero: Rescue Force.
- In 2014, HIRO played Crush Roidmude in Kamen Rider Drive with Danchō and Kuro-chan as his Roidmude lackeys.
- In K-tai Investigator 7. Kuro-chan made a guest appearance on the show.
- The trio appeared in the movie, Bleach: Memories of Nobody, and provided their voices for their anime counterparts. They were seen doing their orange soda and fundoshi acts, before being interrupted by Senna doing her tightrope act above the stage.
- Kuro-chan is a recurring guest in AKBingo!.

== TV Appearances ==
=== Tokusatsu ===
- Tomica Hero: Rescue Force (2008) (Maare (Kuro-chan), San (Danchō Yasuda), Sica (HIRO))
- Kamen Rider Drive (2014) (Cobra-Type Roidmude 023/Crush Roidmude (Ep. 4 - 6) (HIRO), Spider-Type Roidmude 060 (Ep. 5) (Danchō Yasuda), Cobra-Type Roidmude 074 (Ep. 5 - 6) (Kuro-chan))
