= Just deserts (disambiguation) =

Just deserts are things deserved.

Just deserts may also refer to:

- Just deserts (law)
- Just Deserts, a novel by Eric Walters

== See also ==
- Just Desserts (disambiguation)
