= Sayaka Akimoto =

Japanese actress and singer (born 1988)

- 秋元 才加
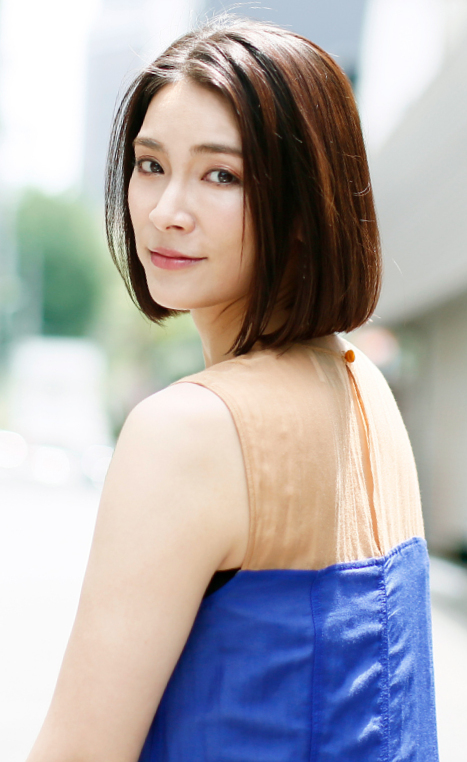
- Akimoto in July 2021
- Born: 26 July 1988 (age 38); Makati, Philippines
- Occupations: Actress; singer
- Years active: 2006–present
- Agent: Flave Entertainment (formerly)
- Spouse: PUNPEE (m. 2020)
- Children: 1
- Musical career
- Genres: J-pop
- Years active: 2006–2014
- Labels: King (AKB48); Avex Trax (Diva); UMG Japan (with Chocolove from AKB48)
- Formerly of: AKB48; Diva; Chocolove from AKB48
- Website: sayaka-akimoto.com

Sayaka Akimoto (秋元 才加, Akimoto Sayaka; born July 26, 1988) is a Japanese actress and singer. She was a member of Japanese idol girl group AKB48 and its spin-off unit Diva.

As an actress, Akimoto has appeared in both Japanese and American productions, and made her Hollywood debut in Sniper: Assassin's End (2020). She also provides the Japanese dub for Mantis in the Marvel Cinematic Universe.

== Career ==
=== Family and early career ===
Akimoto was born to a Japanese father and a Filipino mother. In 2012, she ran the Tokyo Marathon for the second year in a row and donated the money to the Philippines. Her solo book of photographs is entitled Ari no Mama. On June 26, 2014, Akimoto was appointed as the Goodwill Philippine Tourism Ambassador to promote the Philippines as a tourist destination in Japan. She was also assigned as a narrator in the collaboration drama of PTV-4 and Nippon TV entitled "Halo Halo House-Jose's Nippon Diary"

=== 2006–2013: AKB48 member ===
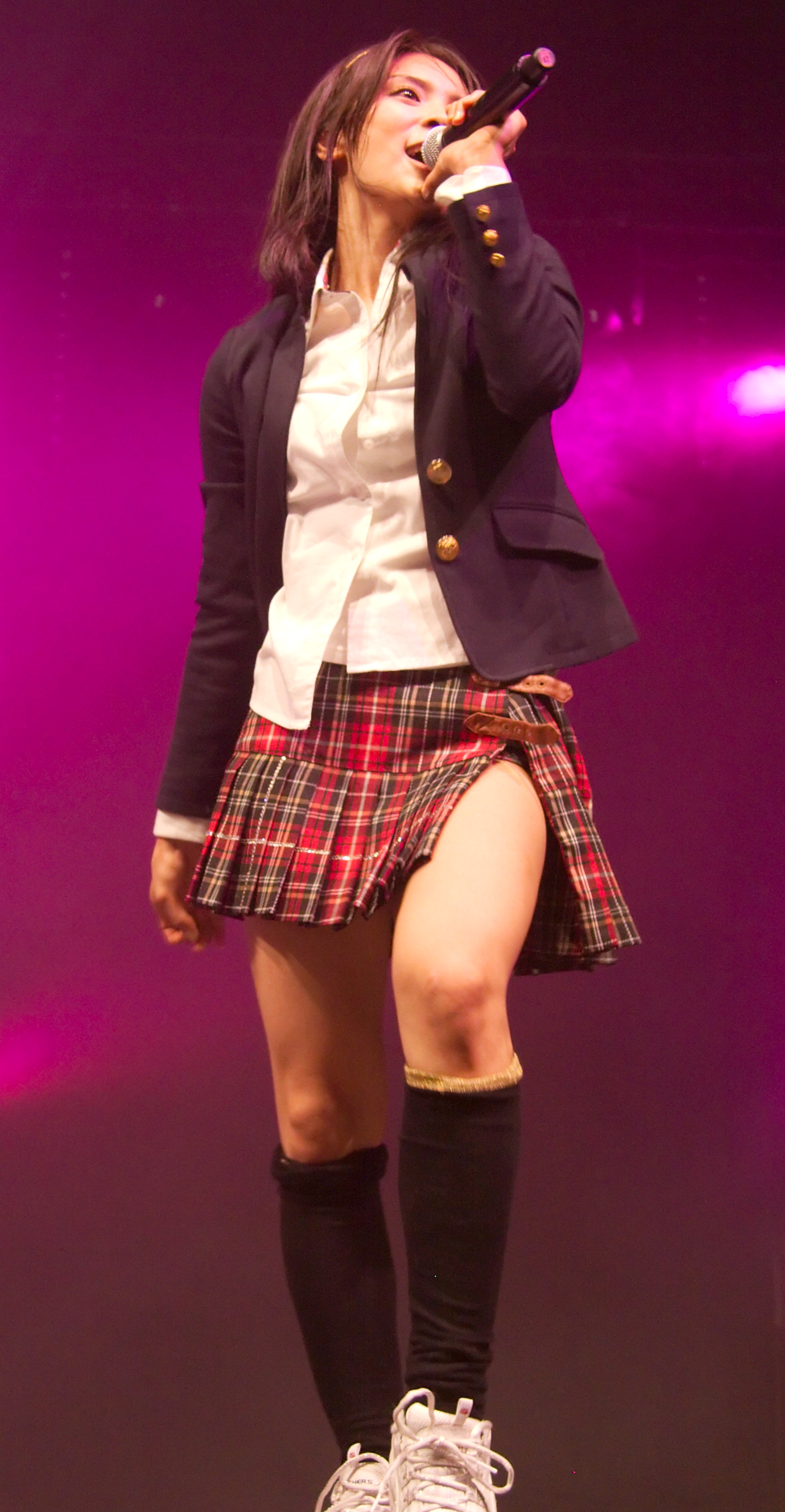
Sayaka Akimoto at the Japan Expo 2009 in Paris, France

Akimoto began her career in AKB48 as one of the members of the second generation, the Original Team K. On the last day of the Budokan concert on August 23, 2009, during the first team shuffle, Akimoto was officially made captain of Team K. She resigned after a scandal in 2010 but after completing the Tokyo Marathon in 2011, she was reappointed the position. On August 24, 2012, in the Tokyo Dome~1830m no Yume~ concert, Yuko Oshima replaced her as the captain of Team K via team shuffle.

She has since been involved with sub-unit group Diva under Avex. She became a regular on the popular noon TV show Waratte Iitomo from 2010 to 2012. She was also featured as one of the members in AKB48's own anime television show alongside other members Minami Takahashi, Yuko Oshima, Tomomi Itano, Atsuko Maeda and others.

On April 7, 2013, Akimoto announced on her official blog that she would not be participating in AKB48's 2013 general election, and would be graduating from AKB48 to focus on her acting. Her graduation ceremony was held on August 22 at the Tokyo Dome, and her final stage performance was held on August 28 at the AKB48 Theater, and has been streamed live by Nico Nico Namahousou.

=== 2014–present: Solo career ===
In 2014, she reunited with her sub-unit group DIVA to release their final single "Discovery", an album, and a tour before disbandment.

She composed and sang "Little Witch" which was the NHK 2014 Spring Campaign Theme Song.

Since leaving AKB48 she has starred in four films. She has a recurring role as Bikuu in Garo which led to a solo film spin off in 2015. She sang the theme song of the film entitled "Sengetsu ~Hikari to Yami no Soba de~".

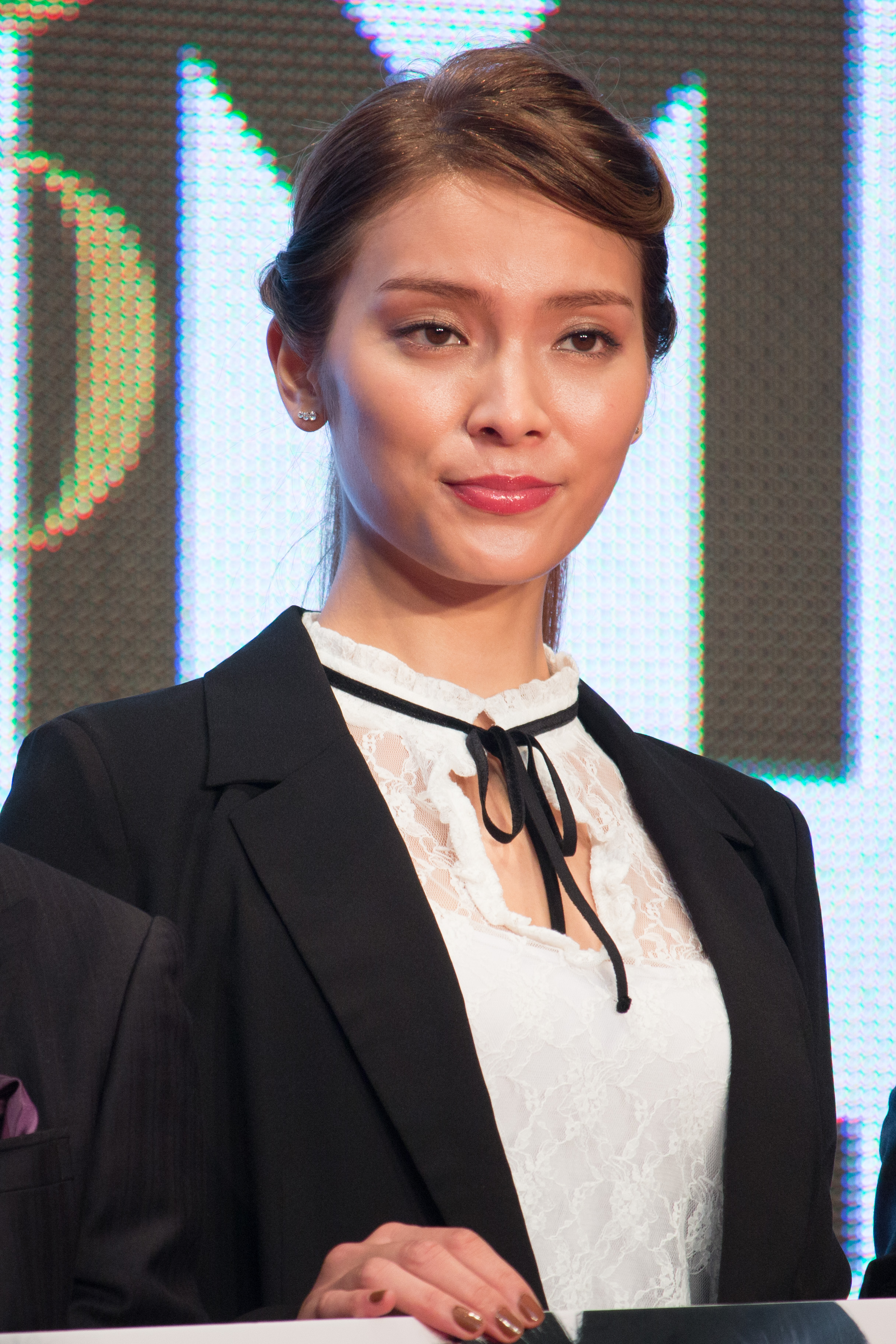
Akimoto at the 28th Tokyo International Film Festival

Akimoto was a co-host for Team Japan in the reality competition show Ultimate Beastmaster which was released on Netflix on February 24, 2017.

== Personal life ==
On July 27, 2020, Akimoto married music producer and singer PUNPEE. She gave birth to their first child on October 4, 2023.

== Discography ==
=== With AKB48 ===
==== Singles ====
Year	No.	Title	Role	Notes
2006	1	"Aitakatta"	A-side	Debut with Team K. Also sang on "Dakedo..."
2007	2	"Seifuku ga Jama o Suru"	A-side	Also sang on "Virgin Love"
2007	3	"Keibetsu Shiteita Aijō"	A-side	
2007	4	"Bingo!"	A-side	Also sang on "Only Today"
2007	5	"Boku no Taiyō"	A-side	Also sang on "Mirai no Kajitsu".
2008	7	"Romance, Irane"	A-side	Also sang on "Ai no moufu".
2008	8	"Sakura no Hanabiratachi 2008"	A-side	
2008	9	"Baby! Baby! Baby!"	A-side	
2008	10	"Ōgoe Diamond"	A-side	Also sang on "109".
2009	11	"10nen Sakura"	A-side	
2009	13	"Iiwake Maybe"	A-side	Ranked 12th in 2009 General Election.
2009	14	"River"	A-side	
2010	15	"Sakura no Shiori"	A-side	Also sang on "Majisuka Rock 'n' Roll".
2010	16	"Ponytail to Shushu"	Under Girls	Did not sing on title track. Sang on "Nusumareta Kuchibiru" as Under Girls; and "Majijo Teppen Blues"
2010	17	"Heavy Rotation"	A-side, Yasai Sisters	Ranked 17th in 2010 General Election. Also sang on "Yasai Sisters".
2010	18	"Beginner"	Diva	Did not sing on title track. Sang on "Nakeru Basho" as Diva.
2010	19	"Chance no Junban"	B-side	Did not sing on title track; lineup was determined by rock-paper-scissors tournament. Sang on "Alive" with Team K.
2011	20	"Sakura no Ki ni Narō"	Diva	Did not sing on title track. Sang on "Area K" as Diva.
2011	--	"Dareka no Tame ni - What can I do for someone?"	--	Charity single
2011	21	"Everyday, Katyusha"	B-side	Did not sing on title track. Sang on "Yankee Soul".
2011	22	"Flying Get"	A-side	Ranked 17th in 2011 General Election. Also sang on "Seishun to Kizukanai mama"; and "Yasai Uranai" as Yasai Sisters 2011.
2011	23	"Kaze wa Fuiteiru"	Under Girls Yurigumi	Did not sing on title track. Sang on "Gondola Lift" as Under Girls Yurigumi.
2011	24	"Ue kara Mariko"	A-side	Lineup was determined by rock-paper-scissors tournament; She sang on "Zero-sum Taiyō" as Team K.
2012	25	"Give Me Five!"	Special Girls B	Did not sing on title track. Sang on "Hitsujikai no Tabi" as Special Girls B.
2012	26	"Manatsu no Sounds Good!"	Special Girls	Did not sing on title track. Sang on "Mitsu no Namida" as Special Girls.
2012	27	"Gingham Check"	Under Girls	Did not sing on title track. Ranked 20th in 2012 General Election. She sang on "Nante Bohemian" as Under Girls.
2012	28	"Uza"	New Team K	Did not sing on title track. Sang on "Scrap & Build" as New Team K.
2012	29	"Eien Pressure"	B-side	Did not sing on title track; lineup was determined by rock-paper-scissors tournament. Sang on "Watashitachi no Reason".
2013	30	"So Long!"	B-side	Did not sing on title track. Sang on "Yuuhi Marie" as Team K.
2013	31	"Sayonara Crawl"	B-side	Did not sing on title track. Sang on "How Come?" as Team K.
2014	36	"Labrador Retriever"	B-side	Did not participate in title song. Participated in "Kyō made no Melody" as graduated member.

=== Singles with SKE48 ===
Year	No.	Title	Role	Notes
2016	19	"Chicken Line"	B-side	Sang on "Tabi no Tochū". Participated as graduated member.

==== Stage units ====
Team K 1st Stage "Party ga Hajimaru yo" (PARTYが始まるよ)

- Skirt, Hirari (スカート、ひらり)
- Hoshi no Ondo (星の温度)

Team K 2nd Stage "Seishun Girls" (青春ガールズ)

- Blue Rose
- Fushidara na Natsu (ふしだらな夏)

Team K 3rd Stage "Nōnai Paradise" (脳内パラダイス)

- Kimi wa Pegasus (君はペガサス)

Himawari Gumi 1st Stage "Boku no Taiyō" (僕の太陽)

- Himawari (向日葵)

Himawari Gumi 2nd Stage "Yume o Shinaseru Wakeni Ikanai" (夢を死なせるわけにいかない)

- Confession

Team K 4th Stage "Saishū Bell ga Naru" (最終ベルが鳴る)

- Return Match (リターンマッチ)

Team K 5th Stage "Sakaagari" (逆上がり)

- Mushi no Ballad (虫のバラード) (Solo Unit)

Team K 6th Stage "Reset"

- Ashita no Tame ni Kiss o (明日のためにキスを)

Team K Waiting Stage

- Anata to Christmas Eve (あなたとクリスマスイブ)
- Yuuwaku no Garter (誘惑のガーター)

=== With Diva ===
- "Tsuki no Ura gawa"
  - "Fade out"
  - "Information"
  - "Blue rose -Diva ver.-"
- "Cry"
  - "No way out"
  - "Chika Suidō"
  - "Maria -Diva ver.-"
- "Lost the Way"
  - "Kanashimi no Mirage"
  - "Kimi wa Pegasus -Diva ver.-"

== Filmography ==
=== Films ===
Year	Title	Role	Notes	Ref.
2007	Densen Uta	Shuri Matsuda		
2009	Super Gore Girl	Yukie Takashi	Lead role	
2009	High Kick Girl!	Rika		
2012	Ultraman Saga	Anna Ozaki		
2014	Tokyo Slaves	Eia Arakawa	Lead role	
2015	Bikuu the Movie	Bikuu	Lead role	
2015	Mango and the Red Wheelchair	Ayaka Miyasono	Lead role	
2015	Galaxy Turnpike	Manmo		
2020	Sniper: Assassin's End	Yuki "Lady Death" Mifune	American film	
2020	Beautiful Dreamer	Sayaka		
2023	Sniper: Rogue Mission	Yuki "Lady Death" Mifune	American film	
2025	#Iwilltellyouthetruth			

=== Television dramas ===
Year	Title	Role	Notes	Ref.
2016	Good Morning Call	Yukari		
2016	Sumika Sumire	Chiaki Yoshinogo		
2021	Aikatsu Planet!	Izumi Watanuki		
2022	The 13 Lords of the Shogun	Tomoe Gozen	Taiga drama	
2025	Pray Speak What Has Happened	Mone Kezune		

=== Stage plays ===
Year	English title	Japanese title	Role	Ref.
2008	Oishii Timing	おいしいタイミング	Unknown	
2010	Space Wars	スペース・ウォーズ	Unknown	
2010	Act Izumi Kyoka	音楽劇 「ACT泉鏡花」	Tomohime (富姫)	
2012	Roman Holiday	ローマの休日	Ann Princess (アン王女)	
2014	Kokumin no Eiga	国民の映画	Elsa Veesenmayer (エルザ・フェーゼンマイヤー)	
2018	Japan's History	日本の歴史	Unknown	

=== Musicals ===
Year	English title	Japanese title	Role
2009	AKB Kagekidan Infinity	AKB歌劇団 「∞・Infinity」	Muraama Ruka (村雨ルカ)
2010	Minky Momo: Kagami no Kuni no Princess	ミンキーモモ〜鏡の国のプリンセス〜	Nightmare (ナイトメアー)
2011	Super Live Show "Double Heroine"	スーパーLIVEショー「ダブルヒロイン」	Kinoshita Rachel (木下レイチェル)
2013	Mozart l'Opéra Rock	ロックオペラ モーツァルト	Constanze (コンスタンツェ)
2015	Shelock Holmes 2: Bloody Game	シャーロック ホームズ2 ～ブラッディ・ゲーム～	Maria Clara (マリア・クララ)
2018	Ghost the Musical	ゴースト	Molly Jensen (モリー・イェンセン)

=== Other television ===
Year	Title	Role
2008	Mujack	Self
2008	AKB 0ji 59fun	Self
2008–2013	AKBingo!	Self
2008–2010	AKB48 Nemosu TV (AKB48ネ申テレビ)	Self
2009–2010	Shukan AKB48 (週刊AKB)	Self
2009	Music Fighter	Self
2010	G.I. Goro	Self
2010–2012	Waratte Iitomo!	Self
2014	Couple Kitchen	Self
2017	Ultimate Beastmaster	Host for Team Japan

=== Japanese dub ===
Year	Title	Role	Voice dub for	Ref.
2013	Spring Breakers	Faith	Selena Gomez	
2017	Guardians of the Galaxy Vol. 2	Mantis	Pom Klementieff	
2018	Avengers: Infinity War	Mantis	Pom Klementieff	
2019	Avengers: Endgame	Mantis	Pom Klementieff	
2022	Thor: Love and Thunder	Mantis	Pom Klementieff	
2023	Guardians of the Galaxy Vol. 3	Mantis	Pom Klementieff	
