= No Way Man =

2018 single by AKB48

- Type A Regular Edition cover

Single by AKB48
- Released: November 28, 2018
- Genre: J-pop
- Label: King Records
- Composers: Maesako Junya, Ishio Yasutaka
- Lyricist: Yasushi Akimoto
- Producers: Junya Maesako, Yasutaka.Ishio

AKB48 singles chronology
"Sentimental Train" (2018)	"No Way Man" (2018)	"Jiwaru Days" (2019)

Alternative cover
- Type-A Limited Edition cover that also used for digital platform

Music video
- "NO WAY MAN" on YouTube

"No Way Man" (Japanese: ノーウェイマン, romanized: Noo Wei Man) is the 54th single (second to last in the Heisei Period) by the Japanese idol girl group, AKB48. It was released in Japan by King Records on November 28, 2018.

The single features Sakura Miyawaki as both the lead singer and choreographic center.

This is the last single to feature Sakura Miyawaki, Hitomi Honda, and Nako Yabuki, the three winning contestants of Produce 48, before they began their activities in Iz*One. This single also marked the last performance of Miyu Takeuchi before her departure from the group.

The song No Way Man has been redone by AKB48 Team SH's in China in 2019. and MNL48's in Filipino in 2022.

== Background & release ==
Announcement of the single was announced through the group's Showroom channel on September 24, 2018. It revealed the participating members from across the AKB48 Group based in Japan that will feature in the single's main song, leading to a total of 23 members. The top 20 Japanese contestants from Produce 48 were also featured in the single's main song, marking members Hitomi Honda and Miu Shitao's first time performing in an A-side single. The single also marked member Miyu Takeuchi's first appearance on an A-side single since the 2012 single Eien Pressure.

The single was released in 5 different physical versions which contain a CD, a DVD and a CD booklet. Each physical version was also issued in two different editions; regular edition, and limited-edition version which also contained an additional ballot for participating in the group's annual Request Hour event. Each released version contains a different track list and different photo cover. The single also included a theater edition version which contained a CD with additional songs and a solo cover from Sakura Miyawaki as center performer. In total, the single was released in 11 physical versions.

The digital version of this single was released in six different versions which are credited as Type-A, Type-B, Type-C, Type-D and Type-E. The album cover uses the Limited Edition version cover as the theater version's track list is the same as the physical version.

The entire single features 124 members; 62 members from AKB48, 17 members from HKT48, 15 members from NGT48, 12 members from NMB48, 10 members from SKE48, and the last 8 members from STU48.

== Promotion ==
No Way Man was first played through the group's radio show, AKB48 no All Night Nippon, on October 24. The B-side that is sung by the PRODUCE48 Senbatsu was also played on the same show on October 31. Another song that was included in this single was also played on bayfm ON8+1, a radio show that is hosted by member Miho Miyazaki.

To further promote the song, the members who participated in No Way Man appeared on several Japanese music shows around 2018, including the annual Best Hits Kayosai by Yomiuri TV, Best Artist 2018 by NTV, Count Down TV by TBS, and Music Station by TV Asahi.

Because three of the participating members in the single's main song were also active members of Iz*One, there has only been one performance of the song that features all of the original members, which took place on FNS's Music Festival. To replace the original performers, the group sometimes chooses rotational members to fill the positions. In special occasions like for Best Hits Kayosai performances, the group holds a special audition first before selecting members to perform.

== Music video ==
The "No Way Man" music video was released on October 26, 2018. A Billboard Japan review claimed the video showcases the group's most demanding choreography to date.

The official music video was published on the official AKB48 YouTube channel.

The music video features dramatic performances by the chosen members backed by an array of colors and flashing lights.

== Chart performance ==
"No Way Man" debuted at the top of the Oricon Singles Chart on its first day, with 1,173,015 physical copies sold. The single stayed at the top of the chart on its second and third day, and dropped to number three on its fourth day. The song debuted at the top of the chart in its first week, with 1,205,009 physical copies sold.

By October 28, 2018, "No Way Man" surpassed 2.5 million views on YouTube. Within the first 24 hours of being posted online, it accumulated 1.39 million views. The music video also the most viewed music video among any 2017-2020 releases from AKB48.

On November 28, Billboard Japan reported that the single sold 1,313,247 copies in joint sales on its first day, becoming the fourth single released by AKB48 in 2018 to surpass the one million mark on its first day (followed by "Jabaja" with 1.1 million copies, "Teacher Teacher" with 2.58 million copies, and "Sentimental Train" with 1.31 million copies sold.).

The song debuted at number 70 in Billboard Japan's Hot 100 for the week ending December 3, 2018, and topped the chart in the following week.

"No Way Man" is the fifth best-selling single of 2018 on Oricon.

== Track listing ==
Type A – CD+DVD (Regular Edition/Limited Edition)
No.	Title	Lyrics	Music	Arrangement	Length
1.	"No Way Man"	Yasushi Akimoto	Maesako Junya; Ishio Yasutaka	APAZZI	5:18
2.	"Ike no Mizu wo Nukitai" (池の水を抜きたい)	Yasushi Akimoto		Koji Goto	4:13
3.	"Wakariyasukute Gomen" (わかりやすくてごめん)	Yasushi Akimoto		CHOCOLATE MIX	4:24
4.	"No Way Man" (Off Vocal Ver.)				5:15
5.	"Ike no Mizu wo Nukitai" (Off Vocal Ver.)				4:13
6.	"Wakariyasukute Gomen" (Off Vocal Ver.)				4:23

Type B – CD+DVD (Regular Edition/Limited Edition)
No.	Title	Lyrics	Music	Arrangement	Length
1.	"No Way Man"	Yasushi Akimoto	Maesako Junya; Ishio Yasutaka	APAZZI	5:18
2.	"Ike no Mizu wo Nukitai" (池の水を抜きたい)	Yasushi Akimoto		Koji Goto	4:13
3.	"Soredemo Kanojo wa" (それでも彼女は)	Yasushi Akimoto		Dai Murai	4:44
4.	"No Way Man" (Off Vocal Ver.)				5:15
5.	"Ike no Mizu wo Nukitai" (Off Vocal Ver.)				4:13
6.	"Soredemo Kanojo wa" (Off Vocal Ver.)				4:44

Type C – CD+DVD (Regular Edition/Limited Edition)
No.	Title	Lyrics	Music	Arrangement	Length
1.	"No Way Man"	Yasushi Akimoto	Maesako Junya; Ishio Yasutaka	APAZZI	5:18
2.	"Ike no Mizu wo Nukitai" (池の水を抜きたい)	Yasushi Akimoto		Koji Goto	4:13
3.	"Ohayo Kara Hajimaru Sekai" (おはようから始まる世界)	Yasushi Akimoto		Shuho Mitani	4:20
4.	"No Way Man" (Off Vocal Ver.)				5:15
5.	"Ike no Mizu wo Nukitai" (Off Vocal Ver.)				4:13
6.	"Ohayo Kara Hajimaru Sekai" (Off Vocal Ver.)				4:19

Type D – CD+DVD (Regular Edition/Limited Edition)
No.	Title	Lyrics	Music	Arrangement	Length
1.	"No Way Man"	Yasushi Akimoto	Maesako Junya; Ishio Yasutaka	APAZZI	5:18
2.	"Ike no Mizu wo Nukitai" (池の水を抜きたい)	Yasushi Akimoto		Koji Goto	4:13
3.	"Saikyou Twintail" (最強ツインテール)	Yasushi Akimoto		Yusuke Itagaki	4:11
4.	"No Way Man" (Off Vocal Ver.)				5:15
5.	"Ike no Mizu wo Nukitai" (Off Vocal Ver.)				4:13
6.	"Saikyou Twintail" (Off Vocal Ver.)				4:10

Type E – CD+DVD (Regular Edition/Limited Edition)
No.	Title	Lyrics	Music	Arrangement	Length
1.	"No Way Man"	Yasushi Akimoto	Maesako Junya; Ishio Yasutaka	APAZZI	5:18
2.	"Ike no Mizu wo Nukitai" (池の水を抜きたい)	Yasushi Akimoto		Koji Goto	4:13
3.	"Yume e no Process" (夢へのプロセス)	Yasushi Akimoto		Kayuza Matsumoto	5:00
4.	"No Way Man" (Off Vocal Ver.)				5:15
5.	"Ike no Mizu wo Nukitai" (Off Vocal Ver.)				4:13
6.	"Yume e no Process" (Off Vocal Ver.)				4:59

Theater edition – CD (NMAX-1318)
No.	Title	Lyrics	Music	Arrangement	Length
1.	"No Way Man"	Yasushi Akimoto	Maesako Junya; Ishio Yasutaka	APAZZI	5:18
2.	"Ike no Mizu wo Nukitai" (池の水を抜きたい)	Yasushi Akimoto		Koji Goto	4:13
3.	"Mimi wo Fusage!" (耳を塞げ！)	Yasushi Akimoto		SaSA	4:01
4.	"No Way Man" (Off Vocal Ver.)				5:15
5.	"Ike no Mizu wo Nukitai" (Off Vocal Ver.)				4:13
6.	"Mimi wo Fusage!" (Off Vocal Ver.)				4:00

== Personnel ==
=== "No Way Man" ===
"No Way Man" was performed by selection senbatsu performer, consisting of:

- HKT48: Sakura Miyawaki (Center), Nako Yabuki, Rino Sashihara, Miku Tanaka
- AKB48: Hitomi Honda, Miho Miyazaki, Mion Mukaichi, Yui Yokoyama, Yuki Kashiwagi, Juri Takahashi, Miyu Takeuchi, Nana Okada, Mizuki Yamauchi, Rin Okabe, Yui Oguri, Narumi Kuranoo, Miu Shitao
- SKE48: Akari Suda, Maya Sugawara
- NMB48: Miru Shiroma
- NGT48: Yuka Ogino, Rika Nakai
- STU48: Yumiko Takino

=== "Ike no Mizu wo Nukitai" (池の水を抜きたい)" ===
"Ike no Mizu wo Nukitai" (池の水を抜きたい)" was performed by selection Ike no Mizu Senbatsu performer from AKB48, consisting of Shizuka Ōya (Center), Rena Kato, Haruka Komiyama, Minami Minegishi, Rei Nishikawa, Yukari Sasaki, Megu Taniguchi, Ayu Yamabe, and Nao Ota

=== "Wakariyasukute Gomen" (わかりやすくてごめん)" ===
"Wakariyasukute Gomen" (わかりやすくてごめん)" was performed by selection PRODUCE48 Senbatsu performer, consisting of:

- AKB48: Moe Goto (Center), Tomu Muto, Mako Kojima, Saho Iwatate, Erii Chiba, Chiyori Nakanishi, Nanami Asai, Minami Sato
- NMB48: Sae Murase (Center)
- HKT48: Aoi Motomura, Misaki Aramaki, Vivian Murakawa
- NGT48: Noe Yamada

=== "Soredemo Kanojo wa" (それでも彼女は)" ===
"Soredemo Kanojo wa" (それでも彼女は)" was performed by selection Otona Senbatsu 2018 performer, consisting of:

- AKB48: Yuiri Murayama (Center), Kaori Inagaki, Momoka Onishi, Erina Oda, Shiori Sato
- SKE48: Ryoha Kitagawa, Mina Ōba, Nao Furuhata, Sarina Souda
- NMB48: Nagisa Shibuya, Akari Yoshida
- HKT48: Hirona Unjo, Madoka Moriyasu
- NGT48: Maho Yamaguchi
- STU48: Kouko Tanaka

=== "Ohayo Kara Hajimaru Sekai" (おはようから始まる世界)" ===
"Ohayo Kara Hajimaru Sekai" (おはようから始まる世界)" was performed by selection U-19 Senbatsu 2018 performer, consisting of:

- AKB48: Nagisa Sakagushi (Center), Seina Fukuoka, Yurina Gyouten, Hijiri Tanikawa, Yui Yokoyama, Maho Omori
- SKE48: Ayaka Ota
- NMB48: Yuuri Ota, Rei Jōnishi
- HKT48: Aki Toyonaga, Hana Matsuoka, Hinata Matsumoto
- NGT48: Hinata Homma, Minami Kato, Moeka Takakura
- STU48: Fu Yabushita, Mai Nakamura

=== "Saikyou Twintail" (最強ツインテール)" ===
"Saikyou Twintail" (最強ツインテール)" was performed by selection U-16 Senbatsu 2018 performer, consisting of:

- AKB48: Moeka Yahagi (Center), Kurumi Suzuki, Manaka Taguchi, Satone Kubo, Kyoka Yamada
- SKE48: Yuna Obata, Oka Suenaga
- NMB48: Cocona Umeyama, Ayaka Yamamoto
- HKT48: Tomoka Takeda, Akari Watanabe
- NGT48: Tsugumi Oguma
- STU48: Chiho Ishida, Ayumi Ichioka, Hina Iwata, Miyuna Kadowaki

=== "Yume e no Process" (夢へのプロセス)" ===
"Yume e no Process" (夢へのプロセス)" was performed by selection AiKaBu Senbatsu performer, consisting of:

- AKB48: Seina Fukuoka (Center), Manaka Taguchi, Ayana Shinozaki, Nanami Asai, Mizuki Yamauchi, Erina Oda, Yui Oguri, Serika Nagano, Minami Sato
- NMB48: Karin Kojima, Mion Nakagawa
- NGT48: Yuka Ogino, Moeka Takakura, Riko Sugahara, Fuka Murakumo, Maho Yamaguchi

=== "Mimi wo Fusage!" (耳を塞げ！)" ===
"Mimi wo Fusage!" (耳を塞げ！)" was performed by selection Team Nice Fight performer, consisting of:

- AKB48: Ikumi Nakano (Center), Ayana Shinozaki, Manami Ichikawa, Shinobu Mogi, Erina Oda, Serika Nagano
- SKE48: Yuka Asai
- NMB48: Kokoro Naiki, Yuuka Kato
- HKT48: Natsumi Matsuoka, Mina Imada, Sae Kurihara
- NGT48: Rena Hasegawa

== Chart ==
=== Weekly charts ===
Chart (2018)	Peak position
Japan (Oricon)	1
Japan (Japan Hot 100)	1

=== Year-end charts ===
Chart (2018)	Peak position
Japan (Oricon)	5

Chart (2019)	Peak position
Japan (Billboard)	3
Japan (Japan Hot 100)	53

== Certifications ==
Country	Provider	Certifications
Japan	RIAJ	Million

== AKB48 Team SH version ==
"No Way Man"

Single by AKB48 Team SH

from the album 365nichi no Sustainable
- Released: March 25, 2019
- Genre: C-Pop
- Label: Shanghai Shangyue Culture Development Co., Ltd.
- Songwriters: Original Japanese lyrics: Yasushi Akimoto; Chinese lyrics: Composer: Junya Maesako; Yasutaka.Ishio
- Producer: Yasushi Akimoto

AKB48 Team SH singles chronology
"Shonichi" (2019)	"No Way Man" (2019)	"Kimi no Tsuite" (2019)

Music video
- "全新单曲No Way Man 帅气上线！" (New single, No Way Man) on YouTube

"No Way Man" was redone in Mandarin for AKB48's sister group in China, AKB48 Team SH, as the group's second digital single. It was available for digital music platform on March 25, 2019. The group showcased the song for the first time at AKB48 Team SH - The First Fanmeeting in Shanghai on March 23, 2019 as closing performances. Later, the music video was premiered through the group official YouTube channel on the same day of official release.

=== Track listing ===
No.	Title	Lyrics	Music	Arrangement	Length
1.	"No Way Man"	Yasushi Akimoto	Maesako Junya; Ishio Yasutaka	APAZZI	5:14
2.	"No Way Man" (伴奏)		Maesako Junya; Ishio Yasutaka	APAZZI	5:14
Total length:					10:28

=== Personnel ===
"No Way Man" was performed by selection senbatsu performer, consisting of: Xu YiTing (Center), Dai ZiYan, Dong FangChi, Li ShiQi, Liu Nian, Mao WeiJia, Shen Ying, Song XinRan, Wang YuDuo, Wei Xin, Wu AnQi, Ye ZhiEn, Zhai YuJia, Zhou NianQi, Zhu Ling, Zhuang XiaoTi
