= List of Oricon number-one singles of 2017 =

The following is a list of Oricon number-one singles of 2017.

== Chart history ==
Issue date	Song	Artist(s)	Ref.
January 2	"God's S.T.A.R."	QUARTET NIGHT	
January 9	"Boku Igai no Dareka"	NMB48	
January 16	"Michishirube"	Busaiku	
January 23	"Hikari no Atelier"	Mr. Children	
January 30	"EXCITE"	Daichi Miura	
February 6	"Nagurigaki BEAT"	Kanjani Eight	
February 13	"Reboot!!!"	A.B.C-Z	
February 20	"Emma"	News	
February 27	"Bagutte Iijan"	HKT48	
March 6	"OVER THE TOP"	Hey! Say! JUMP	
March 13	"INTER (Tonight/Kimi no Iru Sekai/SEVEN WISHES)"	Kis-My-Ft2	
March 20	"HAPPY"	Sandaime J Soul Brothers from Exile Tribe	
March 27	"Shoot Sign"	AKB48	
April 3	"Influencer"	Nogizaka46	
April 10	"Rock tha Town"	Sexy Zone	
April 17	"Fukyouwaon"	Keyakizaka46	
April 24	"Seishun Dokei"	NGT48	
May 1	"I'll Be There"	Arashi	
May 8	"Chou Never Give Up DANCE"	Bullet Train	
May 15	"COLORS/Taiyo to Tsuki no Kodomotachi"	V6	
May 22	"Blood Sweat & Tears"	BTS	
May 29	"Senakagoshi no Chance"	Kame to Yamapi	
June 5	"Etude wa 1 Kyoku Dake"	The Idolmaster Cinderella Girls Little Stars!	
June 12	"Negaigoto no Mochigusare"	AKB48	
June 19	"PICK IT UP"	Kis-My-Ft2	
June 26	"Seimei/Still Alive"	B'z	
July 3	"Osaka☆AI・EYE・AI/Ya! Hot! Hot!"	Johnny's West	
July 10	"Tsunagu"	Arashi	
July 17	"Precious Girl/Are You There?"	Hey! Say! JUMP	
July 24	"The Red Light"	KinKi Kids	
July 31	"Igai ni Mango"	SKE48	
August 7	"Himawari"	Mr. Children	
August 14	"Kiss wa Matsu Shika Nainodeshoka?"	HKT48	
August 21	"Nigemizu"	Nogizaka46	
August 28	"Family Song"	Gen Hoshino	
September 4	"Taiyo no Elegy"	Flower	
September 11	"#sukinanda"	AKB48	
September 18	"Kiseki no Hito"	Kanjani Eight	
September 25	"Seiiki"	Masaharu Fukuyama	
October 2	"GOLD"	Happiness	
October 9	"Shorinogaika"	Tokendanshi Formation of Mihotose	
October 16	"Gyutto"	Sexy Zone	
October 23	"Itsuka Dekiru Kara Kyou Dekiru"	Nogizaka46	
October 30	"One More Time"	Twice	
November 6	"Kaze ni Fukarete mo"	Keyakizaka46	
November 13	"Kaze ni Fukarete mo"	Keyakizaka46	
November 20	"Doors (Yūki no Kiseki)"	Arashi	
November 27	"Oto Seyo"	Kanjani Eight	
December 4	"11gatsu no Anklet"	AKB48	
December 11	"Akai Kajitsu"	Kis-My-Ft2	
December 18	"MIC Drop/DNA/Crystal Snow"	BTS	
December 25	"J.S.B. HAPPINESS"	Sandaime J Soul Brothers from Exile Tribe	

== See also ==
- List of Oricon number-one albums of 2017
