= List of Hot 100 number-one singles of 2017 (Japan) =

The following is a list of number-one singles on the Billboard Japan Hot 100 chart in 2017. Koi successfully reached Japan's Billboard Year-End Hot 100 singles of 2017, by reaching number-one for 11 non-consecutive weeks.

== Chart history ==
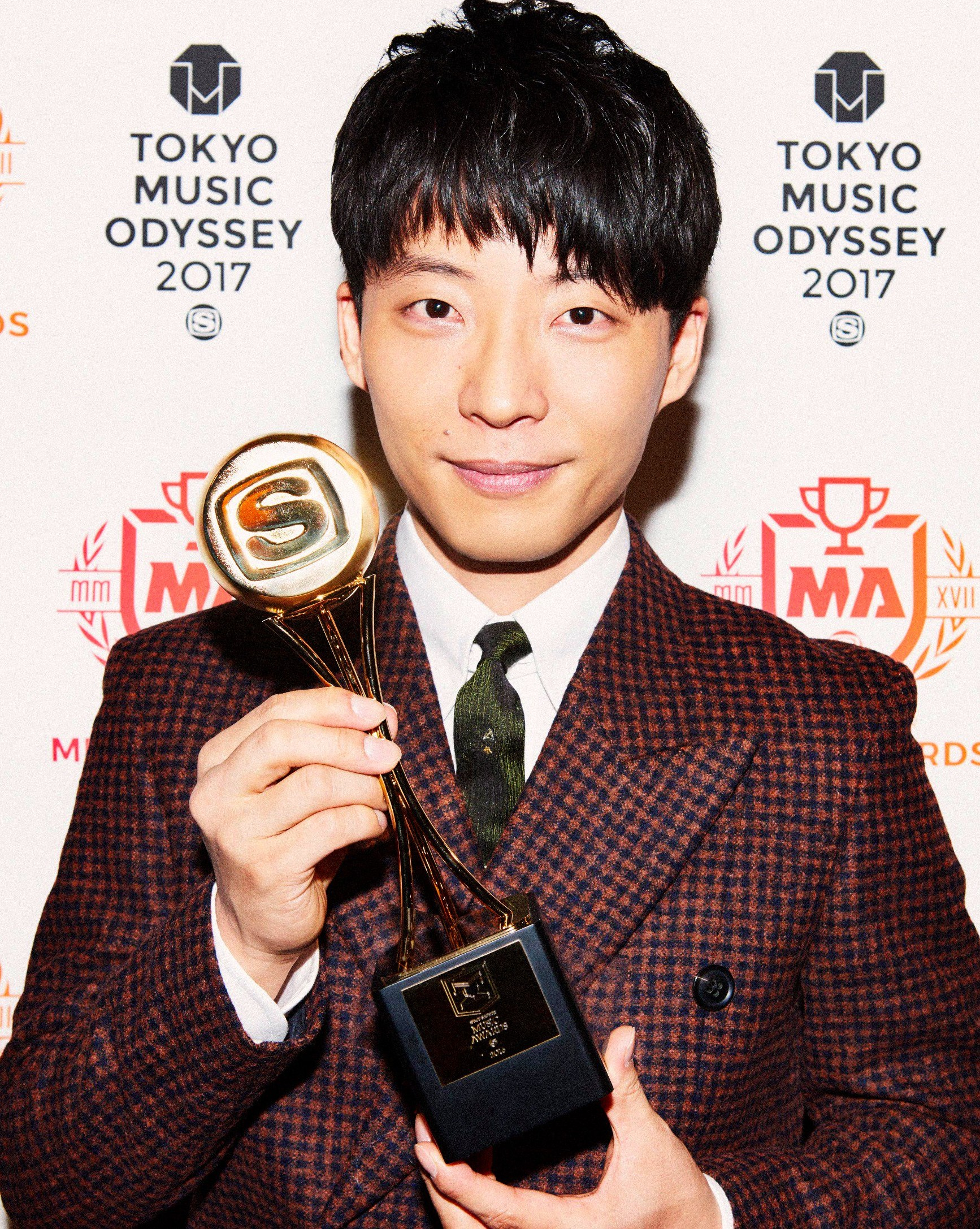
"Koi" by Gen Hoshino is the longest running number-one song of 2017, with six weeks atop the chart.The song finished as the year's top Japan Hot 100 song.

Issue date	Song	Artist(s)	Ref.
January 2	"Koi"	Gen Hoshino	
January 9	"Koi"	Gen Hoshino	
January 16	"Koi"	Gen Hoshino	
January 23	"Koi"	Gen Hoshino	
January 30	"Koi"	Gen Hoshino	
February 6	"Nagurigaki Beat"	Kanjani Eight	
February 13	"Koi"	Gen Hoshino	
February 20	"Emma"	NEWS	
February 27	"Bagutte Iijan"	HKT48	
March 13	"Tonight"	Kis-My-Ft2	
March 20	"Happy"	Sandaime J Soul Brothers from Exile Tribe	
March 27	"Shoot Sign"	AKB48	
April 3	"Influencer"	Nogizaka46	
April 10	"Rock tha Town"	Sexy Zone	
April 17	"Fukyōwaon"	Keyakizaka46	
April 24	"Seishun Dokei"	NGT48	
May 1	"I'll Be There"	Arashi	
May 8	"Chō Nebagiba Dance"	Bullet Train	
May 15	"Colors"	V6	
May 22	"Blood Sweat & Tears"	BTS	
May 29	"Senaka Goshi no Chance"	Kame to YamaP	
June 5	"My Swagger"	Got7	
June 12	"Negaigoto no Mochigusare"	AKB48	
June 19	"Pick It Up"	Kis-My-Ft2	
June 26	"Seimei"	B'z	
July 3	"Peace Sign"	Kenshi Yonezu	
July 10	"Tsunagu"	Arashi	
July 17	"Precious Girl"	Hey! Say! JUMP	
July 24	"The Red Light"	KinKi Kids	
July 31	"Igai ni Mango"	SKE48	
August 7	"Himawari"	Mr. Children	
August 14	"Kiss wa Matsu Shika Nai no Deshō ka?"	HKT48	
August 21	"Nigemizu"	Nogizaka46	
August 28	"Family Song"	Gen Hoshino	
September 4	"Uchiage Hanabi"	Daoko with Kenshi Yonezu	
September 11	"#sukinanda"	AKB48	
September 18	"Kiseki no Hito"	Kanjani Eight	
September 25	"Seiiki"	Masaharu Fukuyama	
October 2	"Uchiage Hanabi"	Daoko with Kenshi Yonezu	
October 9	"Shōri no Gaika"	Tokendanshi Formation of Mihotose	
October 16	"Jama Shinaide Here We Go!"	Morning Musume '17	
October 23	"Itsuka Dekiru Kara Kyou Dekiru"	Nogizaka46	
October 30	"One More Time"	Twice	
November 6	"Kaze ni Fukarete mo"	Keyakizaka46	
November 13	"Kaze ni Fukarete mo"	Keyakizaka46	
November 27	"Oto Seyo"	Kanjani Eight	
December 4	"11 Gatsu no Anklet"	AKB48	
December 11	"Akai Kajitsu"	Kis-My-Ft2	
December 18	"Mic Drop"	BTS	
December 25	"J.S.B. Happiness"	Sandaime J Soul Brothers from Exile Tribe	
