= Haru wa Doko kara Kuru no ka? =

Single by NGT48
- Released: April 11, 2018
- Genre: J-Pop
- Label: Ariola Japan / Sony Music Entertainment Japan

NGT48 singles chronology
"Sekai wa Doko Made Aozora na no ka?" (2017)	"Haru wa Doko kara Kuru no ka?" (2018)

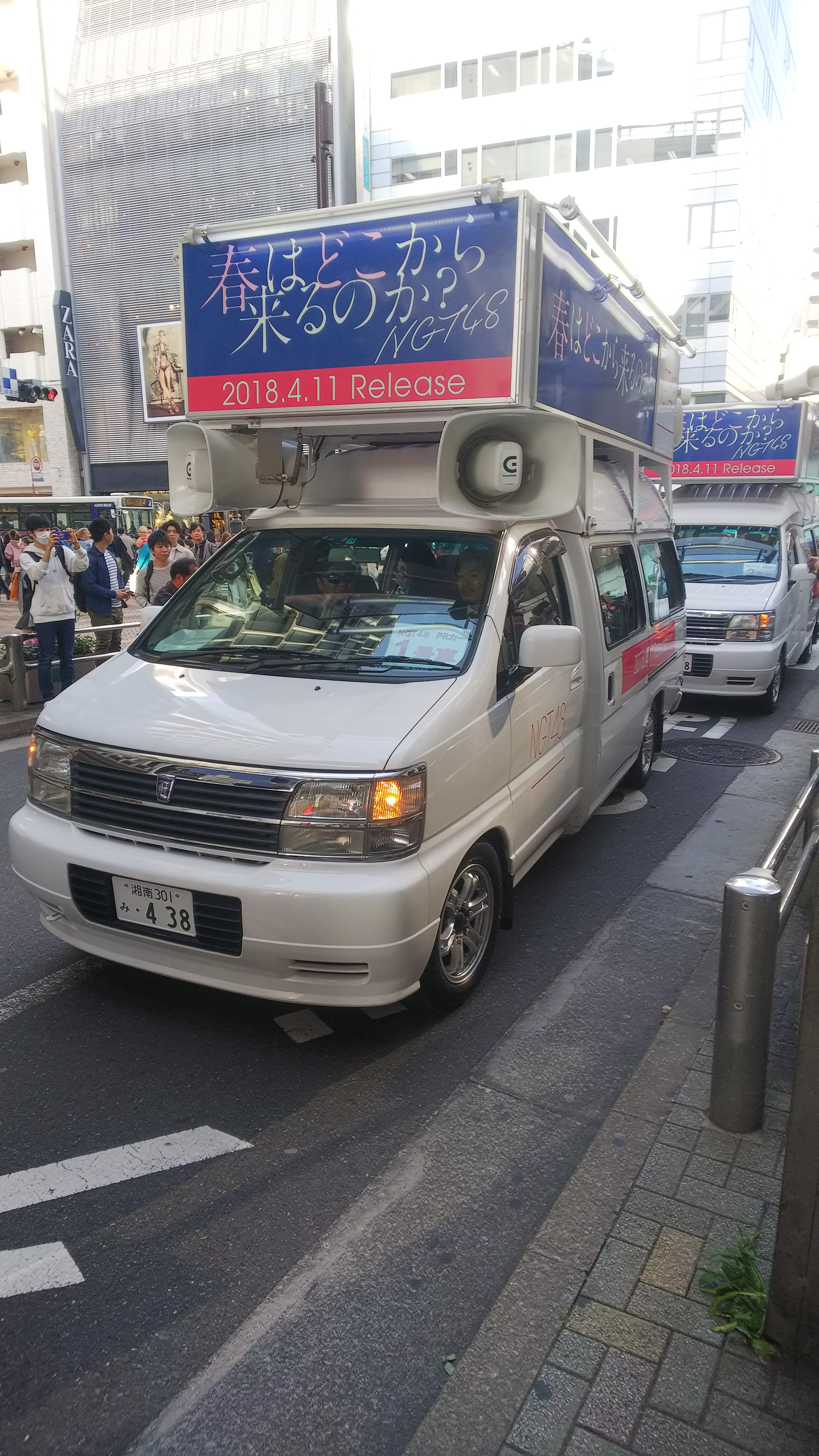
Vans in Tokyo advertising the single’s release

"Haru wa Doko kara kuru no ka?" (春はどこから来るのか？) is the third single by Japanese idol girl group NGT48. It was released on April 11, 2018. It was number-one on the Oricon Singles Chart and was also number-one on the Billboard Japan Hot 100.

== Track listing ==
=== Type A ===
CD+DVD: BVCL-875～6
No.	Title	Length
1.	"Haru wa Doko kara kuru no ka?"
2.	"Jouhatsu Shita Suibun (NGT48 Shodai Uta Senbatsu)"
3.	"Watashi no Tame ni (Kitahara Rie's graduation song)"
4.	"Haru wa Doko kara kuru no ka? (off vocal)"
5.	"Jouhatsu Shita Suibun (off vocal)"
6.	"Watashi no Tame ni (off vocal)"

== Charts ==
=== Weekly charts ===
Chart (2018)	Peak position
Japan (Oricon Singles Chart)	1
Japan (Billboard Japan Japan Hot 100)	1
Japan (Billboard Japan Top Singles Sales)	1
