= Tsubasa wa Iranai =

Single by AKB48

from the album Thumbnail
- A-side: "Tsubasa wa Iranai"
- B-side: "Set Me Free" (Type A, Type B); "Koi o Suru to Baka o Miru" (Type A); "Kangaeru Hito" (Type B); "Aishū no Trumpeter" (Type C, Theater Edition); "Yume e no Route" (Type C); "Kimi wa Doko ni Iru?" (Theater Edition)
- Released: June 1, 2016
- Genre: J-pop; Country music
- Length: 4:35
- Label: You, Be Cool! / King; Genie Music; Stone Music Entertainment
- Songwriter: Yasushi Akimoto (lyrics)
- Producer: Yasushi Akimoto

AKB48 singles chronology
"Kimi wa Melody" (2016)	"Tsubasa wa Iranai" (2016)	"LOVE TRIP / Shiawase wo Wakenasai" (2016)

Music video
- "Tsubasa wa Iranai" on YouTube

"Tsubasa wa Iranai" (翼はいらない; "Wings Aren't Needed") is the 44th single by the Japanese idol girl group AKB48. It was released in Japan on June 1, 2016. It was number-one on the Oricon Weekly Singles Chart with 1,441,000 copies sold. The song also reached number-one on the Billboard Japan Hot 100. It was the best-selling single of 2016 in Japan, with 2.507 million copies according to Billboard Japan and 1,519,387 copies according to Oricon.

== Background ==
The single marks the first time Mion Mukaichi holds the center position in the choreography for the title track of a single by AKB48. It will also be the first time for NMB48 member Ririka Sutō (須藤凜々花) to participate in the title track of a single by AKB48. Tsubasa wa Iranai is the last AKB48 single to feature NMB48 member Miyuki Watanabe, prior to her departure from the AKB48 group in August 2016. Shizuka Oya, who didn’t participate in any A-Sides since Suzukake Nanchara, made her first management-chosen senbatsu appearance in the title track.

The "Theater Edition" of the single will feature a new song by NGT48. The song is titled "Kimi wa Doko ni Iru?" and will be the main theme of the upcoming TV drama series adaptation of Higurashi When They Cry, to be premiered from May 20 on BS Sky PerfecTV!.

== Release ==
The single was released in several versions: Type A (two editions: limited and regular), Type B (limited and regular), Type C (limited and regular) and a version called the "Theater Edition". All versions, except the Theater Edition, include a DVD with several music videos.

The first presses of the single came with a ticket to vote in the AKB48 45th Single Senbatsu Election (to choose the members to be featured in the AKB48 45th Single).

The full version music video premiered on M-On daily program "Sakidori!" on May 13, 2016, and was officially released on YouTube on August 31, 2016, same day as "LOVE TRIP / Shiawase wo Wakenasai" (45th single) official release.

== Track listings ==
=== Type A ===
All lyrics by Yasushi Akimoto.

CD
No.	Title	Length
1.	"Tsubasa wa Iranai" (翼はいらない)	4:35
2.	"Set Me Free" (Set me free) (performed by Team A)	3:29
3.	"Koi o Suru to Baka o Miru" (恋をすると馬鹿を見る) (performed by Team B)	4:21
4.	"Tsubasa wa Iranai off vocal ver."	4:35
5.	"Set Me Free off vocal ver."	3:29
6.	"Koi o Suru to Baka o Miru off vocal ver."	4:20

DVD
No.	Title	Length
1.	"Tsubasa wa Iranai"
2.	"Set Me Free"
3.	"Koi o Suru to Baka o Miru"
4.	"Chiyori Nakanishi Busu Series "Busu no Omoide.""

=== Type B ===
CD
No.	Title	Length
1.	"Tsubasa wa Iranai"	4:35
2.	"Set Me Free" (performed by Team A)	3:29
3.	"Kangaeru Hito" (考える人) (performed by Team 4)	3:53
4.	"Tsubasa wa Iranai off vocal ver."	4:35
5.	"Set Me Free off vocal ver."	3:29
6.	"Kangaeru Hito off vocal ver."	3:51

DVD
No.	Title	Length
1.	"Tsubasa wa Iranai"
2.	"Set Me Free"
3.	"Kangaeru Hito"
4.	"Shuku Minami Takahashi Sotsugyō 148.5cm no Mita Yume in Yokohama Stadium Digest"

=== Type C ===
CD
No.	Title	Length
1.	"Tsubasa wa Iranai"	4:35
2.	"Aishū no Trumpeter" (哀愁のトランペッター) (performed by Team K)	4:17
3.	"Yume e no Route" (夢へのルート) (performed by Team 8)	4:00
4.	"Tsubasa wa Iranai off vocal ver."	4:35
5.	"Aishū no Trumpeter off vocal ver."	4:17
6.	"Yume e no Route off vocal ver."	3:58

DVD
No.	Title	Length
1.	"Tsubasa wa Iranai"
2.	"Aishū no Trumpeter"
3.	"Yume e no Route"
4.	"Tsubasa wa Iranai -Complete Edition-"

=== Theater Edition ===
CD
No.	Title	Length
1.	"Tsubasa wa Iranai"	4:35
2.	"Aishū no Trumpeter" (performed by Team K)	4:17
3.	"Kimi wa Doko ni Iru?" (君はどこにいる?) (performed by NGT48)	4:21
4.	"Tsubasa wa Iranai off vocal ver."	4:35
5.	"Aishū no Trumpeter off vocal ver."	4:17
6.	"Kimi wa Doko ni Iru? off vocal ver."	4:20

== Personnel ==
=== Tsubasa wa Iranai ===
The center (choreography center) is Mion Mukaichi.

- AKB48 Team A: Anna Iriyama, Shizuka Ōya, Haruna Kojima, Haruka Shimazaki, Yui Hiwatashi, Miho Miyazaki, Yui Yokoyama
- AKB48 Team A/Team 8: Nanami Yamada
- AKB48 Team A/NMB48 Team M: Miru Shiroma
- AKB48 Team A/HKT48 Team KIV: Sakura Miyawaki
- AKB48 Team K: Minami Minegishi, Mion Mukaichi, Tomu Mutō
- AKB48 Team K/NMB48 Team N: Sayaka Yamamoto
- AKB48 Team K/HKT48 Team H: Haruka Kodama
- AKB48 Team B: Ryōka Ōshima, Rena Katō, Yuria Kizaki, Mayu Watanabe
- AKB48 Team B/NGT48 Team NIII: Yuki Kashiwagi
- AKB48 Team 4: Nana Okada, Saya Kawamoto, Mako Kojima, Juri Takahashi
- AKB48 Team 4/SKE48 Team S: Ryoha Kitagawa
- SKE48 Team S: Jurina Matsui
- SKE48 Team E: Rara Gotō
- NMB48 Team N: Ririka Sutō
- HKT48 Team H: Rino Sashihara
- NGT48 Team NIII: Minami Kato, Rie Kitahara, Moeka Takakura

=== Set Me Free ===
Sung by Team A members.

- AKB48 Team A: Anna Iriyama, Shizuka Ōya, Nana Ōwada, Mayu Ogasawara, Natsuki Kojima, Haruna Kojima, Yukari Sasaki, Haruka Shimazaki, Miru Shiroma, Kayoko Takita, Megu Taniguchi, Chiyori Nakanishi, Mariko Nakamura, Rina Hirata, Yui Hiwatashi, Ami Maeda, Miho Miyazaki, Sakura Miyawaki, Nanami Yamada, Yui Yokoyama

=== Koi o Suru to Baka o Miru ===
Sung by Team B members.

- AKB48 Team B: Ayano Umeta, Ryōka Ōshima, Yuki Kashiwagi, Rena Katō, Yuria Kizaki, Moe Gotō, Nagisa Sakaguchi, Miyu Takeuchi, Makiho Tatsuya, Miku Tanabe, Seina Fukuoka, Ma Chia-ling, Nako Yabuki, Aeri Yokoshima, Mayu Watanabe, Miyuki Watanabe (Last Single)

=== Kangaeru Hito ===
Sung by Team 4 members.

- AKB48 Team 4: Miyabi Iino, Rina Izuta, Saho Iwatate, Rio ŌKawa, Miyū Ōmori, Ayaka Okada, Nana Okada, Saya Kawamoto, Ryōha Kitagawa, Saki Kitazawa, Mako Kojima, Haruka Komiyama, Kiara Satō, Nagisa Shibuya, Juri Takahashi, Mio Tomonaga, Miki Nishino, Rena Nozawa, Yuiri Murayama

=== Aishū no Trumpeter ===
Sung by Team K members.

- AKB48 Team K: Moe Aigasa, Maria Abe, Haruka Ishida, Manami Ichikawa, Haruka Kodama, Ayana Shinozaki, Haruka Shimada, Hinana Shimoguchi, Mariya Suzuki, Yūka Tano, Chisato Nakata, Ikumi Nakano, Nana Fujita, Minami Minegishi, Mion Mukaichi, Tomu Mutō, Shinobu Mogi, Sayaka Yamamoto, Ami Yumoto

=== Yume e no Route ===
Sung by Team 8 members.

- AKB48 Team 8: Nagisa Sakaguchi, Yui Yokoyama, Hijiri Tanikawa, Nanami Satō, Tsumugi Hayasaka, Akari Satō, Kasumi Mougi, Rin Okabe, Hitomi Honda, Maria Shimizu, Ayane Takahashi, Nanase Yoshikawa, Yui Oguri, Erina Oda, Shiori Satō, Ayaka Hidaritomo, Natsuki Fujimura, Yuri Yokomichi, Yūna Hattori, Ai Yamamoto, Haruna Hashimoto, Reina Kita, Kurena Chō, Moeri Kondō, Serika Nagano, Nao Ōta, Nanami Yamada, Ruka Yamamoto, Momoka Ōnishi, Sayuna Hama, Ikumi Nakano, Mei Abe, Kotone Hitomi, Yūri Tani, Miu Shitao, Riona Hamamatsu, Yurina Gyōten, Kaoru Takaoka, Natsuki Hirose, Karen Yoshida, Rena Fukuchi, Moeka Iwasaki, Narumi Kuranoo, Miyu Yoshino, Moka Yaguchi, Karin Shimoaoki, Rira Miyazato

=== Kimi wa Doko ni Iru? ===
Sung by NGT48 members.

- NGT48: Yuria Ōtaki, Yuka Ogino, Tsugumi Oguma, Yuki Kashiwagi, Minami Katō, Yuria Kado, Rie Kitahara, Aina Kusakabe, Anju Satō, Riko Sugahara, Reina Seiji, Moeka Takakura, Mau Takahashi, Ayaka Tano, Rika Nakai, Ayuka Nakamura, Miharu Nara, Marina Nishigata, Nishimura Nanako, Rena Hasegawa, Hinata Honma, Ayaka Mizusawa, Aya Miyajima, Fūka Murakumo, Maho Yamaguchi, Noe Yamada

== Charts ==
Chart (2016)	Peak position
Japan (Oricon Weekly Singles Chart)	1
Japan (Billboard Japan Hot 100)	1

== Release history ==
Region	Date	Format	Label
Japan	June 1, 2016	CD; digital download; streaming	King Records (YOU BE COOL division)
Hong Kong, Taiwan	June 1, 2016	CD; digital download; streaming	King Records
South Korea	October 19, 2018	digital download; streaming	Stone Music Entertainment; Genie Music; King
