= Minami Kato =

Japanese singer (born 1999)

- 加藤 美南
- Born: January 15, 1999 (age 27); Niigata, Niigata Prefecture, Japan
- Occupations: Singer; actress; model
- Agent: Standby3 (2021-present)
- Height: 152 cm (5 ft 0 in)
- Musical career
- Genre: J-pop
- Years active: 2015–present

Minami Kato (加藤美南, Katō Minami; born January 15, 1999 in Niigata Prefecture) is a Japanese singer and actress. She is a former member of AKB48's sister group NGT48 as a kenkyūsei and was the 2nd captain of the former Team NIII (pronounced N-Three).

== Career ==
On January 25, 2015, at the "AKB48 Request Hour Set List Best 1035 2015" concert, it was announced that AKB48 would form a new sister group under the name NGT48. Auditions to become a member would be starting in March. The auditions actually held place from April 5 until May 18 and on July 25 the first generation members were announced, one of them being Kato.

She was officially promoted from a Kenkyuusei (Research Student) to a member of NGT48 Team NIII (along with 13 other members) on January 10, 2016, which was the day of the NGT48 Theater Opening. On that day she was cast as the female lead for a television series adaptation of Higurashi When They Cry, which was premiered from May 20 on BS Sky PerfecTV!. She made her A-side participation debut for AKB48's 44th Single Tsubasa wa Iranai which was released on June 1, 2016.

Later that month, Kato was the first and only member of NGT48's first generation to rank in AKB48's annual General Election (選抜総選挙, Senbatsu Sousenkyo) ranking 76th with 13,571 votes.

In December 2016, Kato was announced as one of the cast members for the TV drama "Tofu Pro-Wrestling," which premiered on TV Asahi on January 21, 2017. Her pseudonym in the show was "Baton Katomina." On September 7, 2017, she was also announced as a participant in "Tofu Pro-Wrestling, The REAL 2017 CLIMAX", a live wrestling event based on the drama. On January 17, 2018, she was once again listed as a participant for the follow-up event, "Tofu-Pro Wrestling, The REAL 2018 QUEENDOM," to be held on February 23, 2018.

Kato was part of NGT48's 1st Single Seishun Dokei which was released on April 12, 2017. She centered the B-Side Song on the track Kurayami Motomu with Moeka Takakura and was a part of the song Akigan Punk. She was also part of the 2nd single "Sekai wa Doko Made Aozora na no ka?", which was released on December 6, 2017. Together with Ayuka Nakamura she also centered the B-side song Gikochinai Tsuugaku Densha on the Theater Edition.

On June 17, 2017, she improved her ranking in the 2017 Senbatsu Sousenkyou as she rose by a steady number to spot 71 (with 16,641 votes). During her speech, Kato thanked her fans for getting her this rank and said that she hopes she will gain many international fans.

During AKB48's annual Request Hour in 2018, her duet with Noe Yamada ranked 33rd, which made it the highest ranking song from NGT48's most recent stage show, "Hokori no Oka."

Following NGT48's 2019 scandal, on May 21, Kato was demoted to kenkyūsei after posting an Instagram story of Maho Yamaguchi's graduation with the caption, "I'm doing my nails over here. I wish someone would change the channel."

== Discography ==
=== Singles with NGT48 ===
Year	No.	Title	Role	Notes
2017	1	"Seishun Dokei"	Senbatsu and B-side	Part of Senbatsu for "Seishun Dokei". Part of the B-side song "Akigan Punk". Center of the B-side song "Kurayami Motomu" together with Moeka Takakura.
2017	2	"Sekai wa Doko Made Aozora na no ka?"	Senbatsu and B-side	Part of the Senbatsu for "Sekai wa Doko Made Aozora na no ka?". Part of the B-side song "Boku no Namida wa Nageranai". Part of the B-side song "Nani ka ga Ira". Center of the B-side song "Gikochinai Tsuugaku Densha" together with Ayuka Nakamura.
2018	3	"Haru wa Dokokara Kurunoka?"	Senbatsu and B-side	Part of the Senbatsu for "Haru wa Dokokara Kurunoka?". Center of the B-side song "Ato de" together with Moeke Takakura.
2018	4	"Sekai no Hito e"	Senbatsu and B-side	Part of the Senbatsu for "Sekai no Hito e". Center of the B-side song "Kokoro ni Taiyo".

=== Singles with AKB48 ===
Year	No.	Title	Role	Notes
2016	43	"Kimi wa Melody"	B-Side	Together with other members of NGT48, she sang on the single's D Type the song "Max Toki 315go".
2016	44	"Tsubasa wa Iranai"	Senbatsu and B-Side	She performed as a part of the AKB48 Senbatsu the main song "Tsubasa wa Iranai." Together with other members of NGT48, she sang on the single's Theater Edition the song "Kimi wa Doko ni Iru". She was the center for this song.
2016	45	"LOVE TRIP/Shiawase o Wakenasai"	B-side and Upcoming Girls	Sang with other members the song "Hikari to Kage no Hibi". Ranked 76th in the General Election and became part of the Upcoming Girls unit. They performed the song "2016nen no Invitation".
2017	47	"Shoot Sign"	B-Side	Together with other members of NGT48, she sang on the single's D Type the song "Midori to Mori no Undokuen".
2017	48	"Negaigoto no Mochigusare"	B-Side	Sang with other members on the Type C Edition the song "Tenmetsu Pheromone".
2017	49	#Sukinanda	Upcoming Girls	Ranked 71st in the General Election and became part of the Upcoming Girls unit. They Performed the song "Tsuki no Kamen".

=== Albums with AKB48 ===
Thumbnail

- Dare ga Watashi wo Nakaseta?

== Appearances ==
=== Stage Units ===
NGT48 Team NIII 1st Stage "Party ga Hajimaru Yo"

- Skirt, Hirari
- Hoshi no Ondo

NGT48 Team NIII 2nd Stage "Pajama Drive"

- Temodemo no Namida
- Pajama Drive

NGT48 Team NIII 3rd Stage "Hokori no Oka"

- Gesuna Yume

=== TV Variety ===
- AKBingo! (2016 - 2018)
- HKT48 vs. NGT48 Sashikita Gassen

=== Dramas ===
- Higurashi When They Cry (2016) as Rena Ryuugu
- Higurashi When They Cry Kai (2016) as Rena Ryuugu
- Tofu Pro-Wrestling (2017) as herself/Baton Katomina
