= Yuka Ogino =

Japanese media personality (born 1999)

- 荻野由佳
- Born: February 16, 1999 (age 27); Koshigaya, Saitama, Japan
- Occupations: Tarento; model
- Years active: 2014–present
- Agent: OOO Entertainment
- Height: 160 cm (5 ft 3 in)
- Spouse: Undisclosed (m. 2025)
- Children: 1
- Musical career
- Genres: J-pop
- Years active: 2014–2021
- Label: Ariola Japan (NGT48)
- Formerly of: NGT48
- Website: https://www.ogiyuka.com/

Yuka Ogino (荻野由佳, Ogino Yuka; born February 16, 1999 in Koshigaya, Saitama, Japan) is a Japanese tarento and model. She is former member of the Japanese idol girl group NGT48 as a first generation member.

She is affiliated with OOO Entertainment since November 2025.

== Career ==
Ogino has shared in interviews and live streams that she has auditioned for many idol groups before, including AKB48 and Idol Street but didn't pass either of them. She auditioned for AKB48's 15th Generation (2013) and as Team 8's Saitama member, but failed both of them. She was later chosen as a "Baito AKB" member, which meant temporary membership in AKB48. She later returned for the 2nd Group Draft Kaigi (2015) and was chosen by NGT48.

During the 2016 AKB48 General Election, Ogino ranked 95th. In 2017, the first-day results revealed Ogino to be in surprising first place, but after the end of the voting period, she ranked into 5th place, which still meant she was the highest-ranking member of NGT48 in the General Election. This allowed her to be part of the Senbatsu for AKB48's 49th single "#SukiNanda".

Ogino modeled for the fashion brand Heather, but following NGT48's 2019 scandal, she was dropped because of online backlash. On May 20, 2019, an unemployed Japanese man was arrested for allegedly sending death threats against Ogino to Japanese media and Niigata local government offices on May 9, 2019.

On July 27, 2021, Ogino announced her graduation from NGT48. Her graduation concert took place at Toki Messe on October 30, and she officially graduated from the group on November 8.

On May 30, 2022, Ogino terminated her contract with Horipro, her office for 4 years and 10 months. She worked as a freelancer from June of that year until 2024, when she signed a business partnership with FIRST AGENT.

On November 4, 2025, Ogino announced her affiliation with OOO Entertainment.

== Personal life ==
On February 16, 2025, in time for her 26th birthday, Ogino announced her marriage to her non-celebrity partner. On April 19 of the same year, Ogino announced that she is expecting her first child. She later gave birth on September tenth.

== Discography ==
=== Singles with NGT48 ===
Year	No.	Title	Role	Notes
2016	1	"Seishun Dokei"	Senbatsu and B-side	Part of the single song "Seishun Dokei". Center for the B-side song "Shutsujin". Part of the B-side song "Kurayami Motomu".
2017	2	"Sekai wa Doko Made Aozora na no ka?"	Senbatsu and B-side	Center of the single song "Sekai wa Doko Made Aozora na no ka?". Part of the B-side song "Boku no Namida wa Nagarenai". Part of the B-side song "Nani ka ga Iru". Part of the B-side song "Gikochinai Tsuugaku Densha".
2018	4	"Sekai no Hito e"	Senbatsu and B-side	Center of the single song "Sekai no Hito e". Part of the B-side song "Soft Serve". Part of the B-side song "Kokoro ni Taiyou".
2020	5	"Sherbet Pink"	Senbatsu and B-side	Part of the single song "Sherbet Pink". Part of the B-side song "Zetsubou no Ato de".
2021	6	"Awesome"	Senbatsu	Part of the single song "Awesome".

=== Singles with AKB48 ===
Year	No.	Title	Role	Notes
2016	43	"Kimi wa Melody"	B-side	Part of the song "Max Toki 315go" as a member of NGT48.
2016	44	"Tsubasa wa Iranai"	B-side	Part of the song "Kimi wa Doko ni Iru" as a member of NGT48.
2017	47	"Shoot Sign"	B-side	Part of the song "Midori to Mori no Undokouen" as a member of NGT48.
2017	48	"Negaigoto no Mochigusare"	B-side	Part of the song "Ima Para".
2017	49	"#SukiNanda"	Senbatsu and B-side	Ranked 5th in the 2017 General Election and became Senbatsu member for "#SukiNanda". Part of the song "Private Summer" as a member of Showroom Senbatsu.
2017	50	"11gatsu no Anklet"	Senbatsu	Part of the single song "11gatsu no Anklet".
2017	51	"Jabaja"	Senbatsu and B-side	Part of the single song "Jabaja". Part of the B-side song "Tomodachi de Imashou" as a member of NGT48.
2018	52	"Teacher Teacher"	Senbatsu	Part of the single song "Teacher Teacher" as a member of Media Senbatsu.
2018	53	"Sentimental Train"	Senbatsu and B-side	Ranked 4th in the 2018 General Election and became Sekai Senbatsu member for "Sentimental Train". Part of the B-side song "Yuri wo Sakaseru ka?".
2018	54	"No Way Man"	Senbatsu and B-side	Part of the single song "No Way Man". Part of the B-side song "Yume e no Process" as a member of AiKaBu Senbatsu.
2019	55	"Jiwaru Days"	Senbatsu	Part of the single song "Jiwaru Days".

=== Albums with AKB48 ===
Thumbnail

- Dakara Kimi ga Suki na no Ka

Bokutachi wa, Ano Hi no Yoake o Shitteiru

- Kutsuhimo no Musubikata
- Ren'ai Mugen Jigoku

== Appearances ==
=== Stage Units ===
Baito AKB Special Stage

- Glass no I LOVE YOU

NGT48 Team NIII 1st Stage "Party ga Hajimaru Yo"

- Classmate

NGT48 Team NIII 2nd Stage "Pajama Drive"

- Kagami no Naka no Jean Da Arc (Center)
- Pajama Drive

NGT48 Team NIII 3rd Stage "Hokori no Oka"

- Zankokuna Ame (Duet with Yuki Kashiwagi)

=== Media Appearances ===
- AKBingo! (2017 - )
- HKT48 vs. NGT48 Sashikita Gassen (2016)
