= Rie Kitahara =

Japanese singer and actress (born 1991)

Rie Kitahara 北原 里英
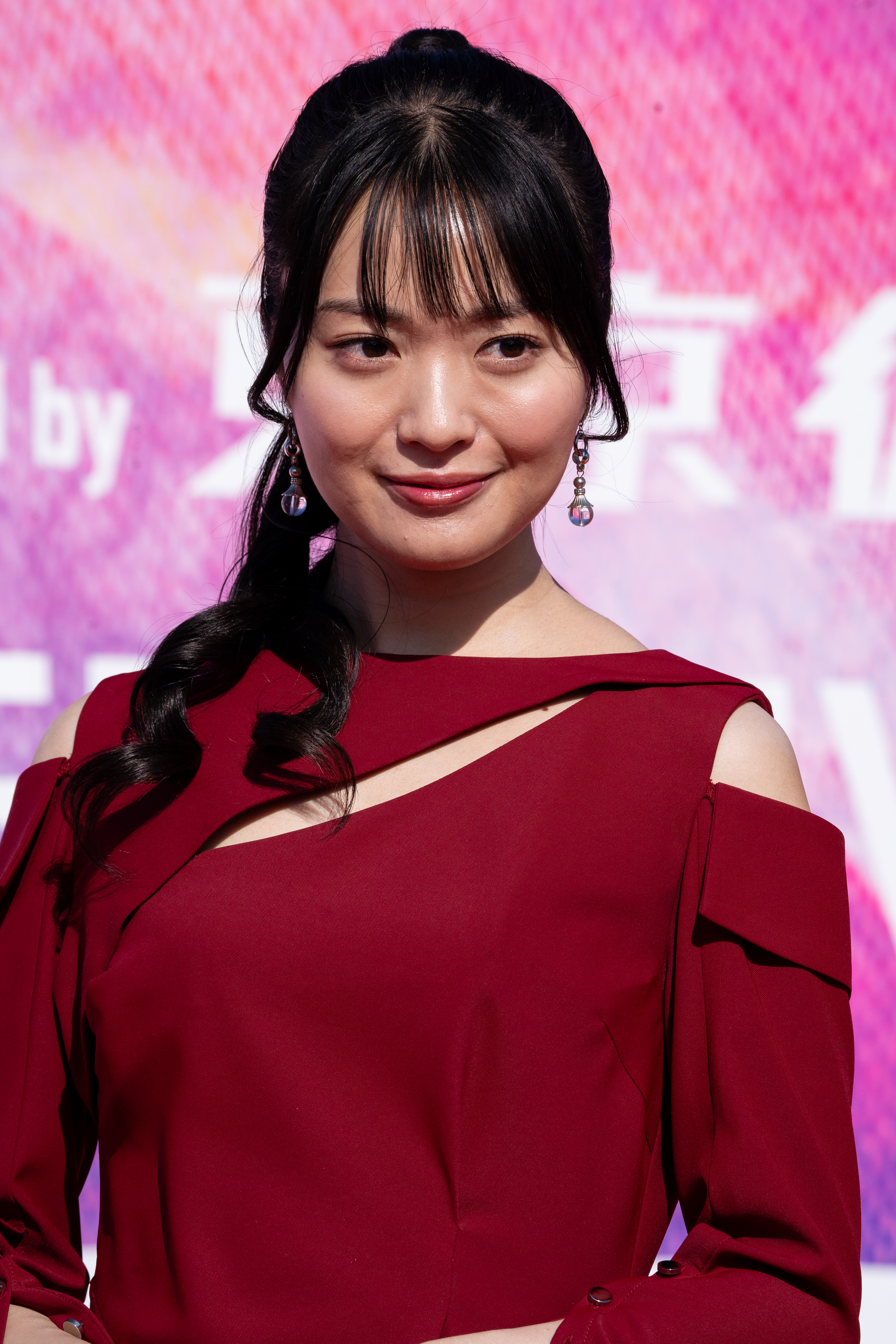
- Kitahara in 2024

Background information
- Born: June 24, 1991 (age 35)
- Origin: Ichinomiya, Aichi, Japan
- Genres: J-pop
- Occupations: Singer; actress
- Instruments: Vocals; drums; piano
- Years active: 2008–present
- Formerly of: AKB48; SKE48; Not Yet; NGT48
- Spouse: Hideyuki Kasahara (m. 2021)

Rie Kitahara (北原 里英, Kitahara Rie; born June 24, 1991) is a Japanese singer and actress formerly associated with the Japanese idol girl group NGT48 and former member of AKB48 and SKE48. She debuted in 2008 in Team A and was later co-captain of Team K (2014). In March 2015, it was announced Kitahara would be transferred to NGT48 as captain of the group. She has sung on many of the groups' main singles, having been voted number 13, 16, 13, 13, 21, 19, 11 and 12 in AKB48's General Elections. In 2017, for her final participation, she was voted number 10 which is her best rank ever. Kitahara was also a member of the AKB48 subgroup Not Yet, active from 2011 to 2015.

She is currently represented by Ohta Production.

== Early life and career ==
Kitahara was born in Ichinomiya, Aichi. In 2009, she was placed 13th overall in AKB48's general election to determine the participants in its next single.

On August 13, 2010, Kitahara debuted as a voice actress in the anime series Gakkō no Kowai Uwasa: Shin Hanako-san ga Kita!!.

In AKB48's 2012 general election, Kitahara placed 13th with 26,531 votes. She made her acting debut in the movie Graffreeter Toki, which was released on July 14, 2012 in Japan. At the end of the year, she was a cast member on the first season of the reality television show Terrace House: Boys × Girls Next Door, where she lived together with five other people.

On August 24, 2012, the first day of AKB48's 3-Tokyo-Dome-concert series, the group announced a reorganization, which placed Kitahara from Team B to Team K, and also made her a concurrent member of AKB48 and SKE48. She debuted with Team S on February 13, 2013. She was transferred from Team S to Team KII, but did not debut with the new team. In April, SKE48 announced it was ending Kitahara's concurrency with the group, which leaves her only with AKB48's Team K.

As a member of the sub-group Not Yet, she is credited for the lyrics of "Guilty Love" (part of the Suika Baby single)

Kitahara starred in the Japanese horror movie Joker Game, released on December 22, 2012. She also appeared in the drama remake, Kazoku Game, which aired on Fuji TV starting April 2013, as a girlfriend of a son of a prominent family member.

On August 21, 2017, she announced she will be leaving NGT48. She graduated on April 18, 2018.

== Personal life ==
On September 29, 2021, Kitahara announced her marriage to actor Hideyuki Kasahara. On July 11, 2024, Kitahara announced through her official social media account that she is expecting her first child, which is said to be due within this year. On November 29, she announced the birth of her first child, a baby girl.

== Discography ==
=== Singles with AKB48 ===
Year	No.	Title	Role	Notes
2008	10	"Ōgoe Diamond"	A-side	Debut with Team A.
2009	11	"10nen Sakura"	A-side	
2009	12	"Namida Surprise!"	A-side	
2009	13	"Iiwake Maybe"	A-side	Ranked 13th in 2009 General Election.
2009	14	"River"	A-side	
2010	15	"Sakura no Shiori"	A-side, Team Young Jump	Debut with Team B. Also sang on "Choose Me!" as Team Young Jump (center).
2010	16	"Ponytail to Shushu"	A-side	Also sang on "Majijo Teppen Blues".
2010	17	"Heavy Rotation"	A-side	Ranked 16th in 2010 General Election. Also sang on "Yasai Sisters" and "Lucky Seven".
2010	18	"Beginner"	A-side	
2010	19	"Chance no Junban"	B-side	Did not sing on title track; lineup was determined by rock-paper-scissors tournament. Sang on "Yoyakushita Christmas"; and "Love Jump" with Team B.
2011	20	"Sakura no Ki ni Narō"	A-side	
2011	--	"Dareka no Tame ni - What can I do for someone?"	--	charity single
2011	21	"Everyday, Katyusha"	A-side	Also sang on "Korekara Wonderland" and "Yankee Soul".
2011	22	"Flying Get"	A-side, Yasai Sisters 2011	Ranked 13th in 2011 General Election. Also sang on "Seishun to Kizukanai Mama"; and on "Yasai Uranai" as Yasai Sisters 2011
2011	23	"Kaze wa Fuiteiru"	A-side	
2011	24	"Ue kara Mariko"	A-side	Lineup was determined by rock-paper-scissors tournament; She sang on "Noël no Yoru"; and on "Yobisute Fantasy" as Team B.
2012	25	"Give Me Five!"	A-side (Baby Blossom), Special Girls B	Sang in chorus with Baby Blossom; She also sang on "Hitsujikai no Tabi" as Special Girls B.
2012	26	"Manatsu no Sounds Good!"	A-side	Also sang on "Gugutasu no Sora" and "Kimi no Tame ni Boku wa..."
2012	27	"Gingham Check"	A-side	Ranked 13th in 2012 General Election.
2012	28	"Uza"	New Team K	Did not sing on title track. Sang on "Scrap & Build" as New Team K.
2012	29	"Eien Pressure"	B-side, OKL48	Debut as concurrent member of AKB48 Team K and SKE48. Did not sing on title track; lineup was determined by rock-paper-scissors tournament. Sang on "Totteoki Christmas"; on "Tsuyogari Tokei" as SKE48; and on "Eien Yori Tsuzuku Yo Ni" as OKL48.
2013	30	"So Long!"	A-side	Concurrent member of AKB48 Team K and SKE48 team S. Also sang on "Yuuhi Marie" as Team K.
2013	31	"Sayonara Crawl"	A-side	First single as AKB48 Team K (dropped SKE48 concurrency). Also sang on "How Come?" as Team K.
2013	32	"Koi Suru Fortune Cookie"	Under Girls	Did not sing on title track. Ranked 21st in 2013 General Election. Sang on "Ai no Imi wo Kanagete Mita" as Under Girls.
2013	33	"Heart Electric"	Under Girls, Team K	Did not sing on title track. Sang on 'Kaisoku to Doutai Shiryoku' as Under Girls and 'Sasameyuki Regret' as Team K.
2013	34	"Suzukake Nanchara"	A-side	Placed 10th in rock-paper-scissors tournament.
2014	35	"Mae Shika Mukanee"	Beauty Giraffes	Did not sing on title track. Sang on 'Kimi no Uso wo Shitteita' as 'Beauty Giraffes'.
2014	36	"Labrador Retriever"	A-side	Also sang "Kyou made no Melody" and "Itoshiki Rival" as part of Team K.
2014	37	"Kokoro no Placard"	B-side	Sang "Dareka ga Nageta Ball" as part of Undergirls. Ranked #19 in general elections.
2014	38	"Kibōteki Refrain"	B-side	Sang "Hajimete no Drive" as part of Team K and "Utaitai".
2015	39	"Green Flash"	B-side	Sang "Haru no Hikari Chikadzuita Natsu"
2015	41	"Halloween Night"	A-side	Ranked 11th in 2015 General Election.
2015	42	"Kuchibiru ni Be My Baby"	A-side	Also sang "365 Nichi no Kamihikōki" and "Senaka Kotoba".
2016	43	"Kimi wa Melody"	A-side	Marked as the 10th Anniversary Single. Also sang "Max Toki 315 Gou" as part of NGT48.
2016	44	"Tsubasa wa Iranai"	A-side	Also sang "Kimi wa Doko ni Iru?" as NGT48.
2016	45	"LOVE TRIP / Shiawase wo Wakenasai"	A-side	Ranked 12th in 2016 General Election. Also sang "Hikari to Kage no Hibi".
2017	47	"Shoot Sign"	A-side	Also sang "Midori to Mori no Undokouen " as part of NGT48.
2017	48	"Negaigoto no Mochigusare"	A-side	Also sang "Ima Para".
2017	49	"#SukiNanda"	A-side	Ranked 10th in 2017 General Election.
2017	50	"11gatsu no Anklet"	A-side	
2018	51	"Jabaja"	B-side	Last Single with AKB48. Sang "Tomodachi de imashō" as NGT48.

=== Singles with SKE48 ===
Year	No.	Title	Role	Notes
2013	11	"Choco no Dorei"	A-side	Debut with Team S.
2013	12	"Utsukushii Inazuma"	Magical Band	Did not participate in title track. She sang on "Band wo Yarou yo" as Magical Band and was associated with AKB48 Team K.

=== Singles with NGT48 ===
Year	No.	Title	Role	Notes
2017	1	"Seishun Dokei"	A-side	Debut with NGT48. Also sang "Akigan Punk" (Wcenter with Kashiwagi Yuki) and "Kurayami Motomu".
2017	2	"Sekai wa Doko Made Aozora na no ka?"	A-side	Also sang "Nani ka ga Iru" and "Gikochinai Tsuugaku Densha".
2018	3	"Haru wa Dokokara Kurunoka?"	A-side	Kitahara's Last Single with NGT48. Also sang "Watashi no Tame ni", which is her graduation song.

== Filmography ==
=== Films ===
- Documentary of AKB48: To Be Continued (2011) - herself
- Documentary of AKB48: Show Must Go On (2012) - herself
- Graffreeter Toki (2012)
- The Joker Game (2012) - Chinatsu Akasawa
- Documentary of AKB48: No Flower Without Rain (2013) - herself
- Documentary of AKB48: The Time Has Come (2014) - herself
- 9tsu no Mado (2016) - segment "Odenwa Arigatou Gozaimasu"
- Ninkyo Yaro (2016)
- Sunny/32 (2018)
- Toshimaen: Haunted Park (2019)
- Kishiryu Sentai Ryusoulger The Movie: Time Slip! Dinosaur Panic!! (2019)
- Rise of the Machine Girls (2019)
- Hero 2020 (2020)
- Trap Girl (2021)
- Detective of Joshidaikoji (2023)
- Love is Outdated (2024)

=== Dramas ===
- Majisuka Gakuen (2010) - Unagi
- Majisuka Gakuen 2 (2011) - Unagi
- Rokudenashi Blues (2011) - Kazumi Mai
- Shiritsu Bakaleya Koko (2012) - Momoko
- Majisuka Gakuen 3 (2012, ep1,12) - prisoner
- Kazoku Game (2013) - Asuka Mogami
- AKB Horror Night: Adrenaline's Night Ep.29 - Prenatal care (2016) - Mizuki
- AKB Love Night: Love Factory Ep.5 - Grilled Meat Date (2016) - Moeno
- Higurashi No Naku Koro Ni (2016) - Takano Miyo
- Sherlock: Untold Stories (2019, ep. 11) - Hitomi Kasuga

=== TV movies ===
- Minna! Esupa Dayo! Bangaihen - Esupa, Miyako e Iku (2015) - Shizuka Tachibana

=== Anime ===
- Gakkō no Kowai Uwasa: Shin Hanako-san ga Kita!!. (2010)

=== Variety shows ===
- AKBingo!
- Naruhodo High School
- AKB 600sec.
- AKB-Kyuu Gourmet Stadium
- AKB48+10
- AKB 1/48
- AKB to XX!
- Bimyo-na Tobira AKB48 no GachiChallenge
- AKB48 Nemōsu TV (AKB48ネ申テレビ?)
- Terrace House: Boys × Girls Next Door
- AKB Kousagi Dojo
- AKB48 no Anta, Dare?
- HKT48 vs. NGT48 Sashikita Gassen
- NGT48 no Niigata Furendo!

=== Radio shows ===
- AKB48 no All Night Nippon
- PORT DE NGT
- NGT48 no Minna Kamitaiou!! Radio Akushukai!!
