= Minami Minegishi =

Japanese media personality, former member of AKB48

- 峯岸 みなみ
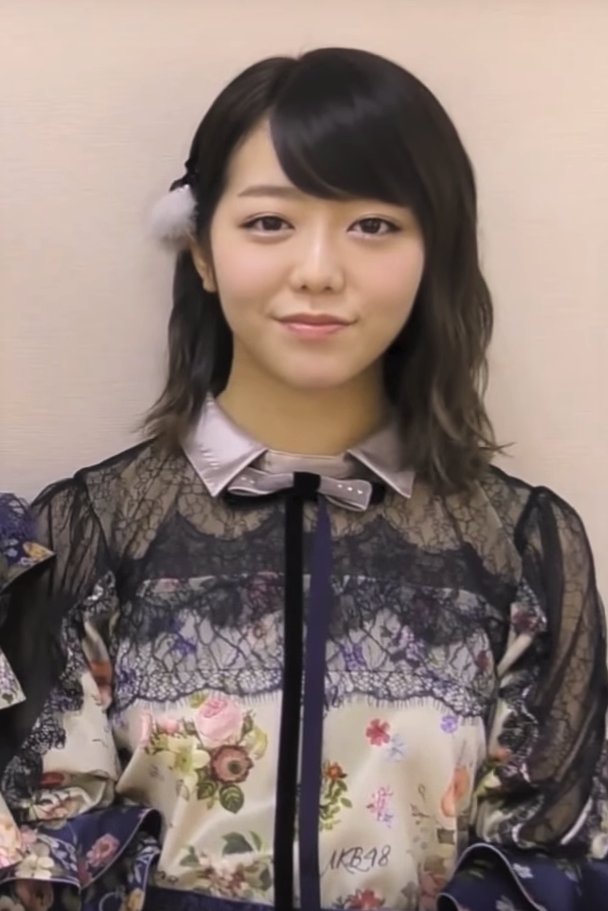
- Minegishi in 2018
- Born: November 15, 1992 (age 33); Itabashi, Tokyo, Japan
- Occupation: Media personality
- Years active: 2005–present
- Spouse: Tetsuya Oyaizu (m. 2022)
- Children: 1
- Musical career
- Genre: J-pop
- Instrument: Vocals
- Years active: 2005–2021
- Labels: King Records (AKB48); Epic (no3b)
- Member of: no3b
- Formerly of: AKB48

YouTube information
- Channel: 峯岸みなみ
- Years active: 2019-present
- Genres: Vlog; music; comedy
- Subscribers: 427,000
- Views: 74,743,832
- Last updated: 11 May 2026

Minami Minegishi (峯岸 みなみ, Minegishi Minami; born November 15, 1992) is a Japanese media personality best known for her affiliation with the idol girl group AKB48 and its subunit no3b. She has the longest tenure among AKB48's original members, lasting 16 years from 2005 to 2021.

== Career ==
=== Early days at AKB48 ===
Minegishi debuted with AKB48 Team A in 2005. She ranked 14th in the AKB48 2012 general election with 25,638 votes. She is one of the three members of AKB48 sub-group no3b, with whom she played in the drama Mendol, Ikemen Idol in 2008 and sang its theme song as the fictional band "Persona". She has also been a frequent guest on television variety shows. Beyond appearing in commercials as a member of AKB48, she has also appeared in some by herself.

=== Scandal and demotion ===
On January 31, 2013, the weekly tabloid Shukan Bunshun reported that Minegishi had spent a night at the apartment of actor Alan Shirahama with an undisclosed member of the boy band Generations from Exile Tribe. A few hours later, it was announced through the AKB48 official blog that she would be demoted from Team B to kenkyūsei (trainee) status as of February 1. She thus became the first AKB48 member to be demoted to kenkyūsei in four years since Miki Saotome in late January 2009. On the same day, the AKB48 official channel published a video of Minegishi with her head shaved (or more accurately reduced to a crew cut), apologizing to her fans for her "thoughtless behavior" and hoping that the management would let her stay in the group, with other members that she loved. In the YouTube statement, Minegishi explained that she cut her hair in a state of shock induced by reading the Shukan Bunshun scoop, when she could not calm down. In Japan, cutting one's hair is a way of showing contrition. However, the shaving of her hair was criticised by fans and commentators that it went too far, and might have even been a publicity stunt arranged by Yasushi Akimoto, the producer behind AKB48.

In an article for The Japan Times, titled: "AKB48 member’s ‘penance’ shows flaws in idol culture", Ian Martin noted: "What is happening here is that the protection of fans’ fragile fantasies automatically trumps the basic human right to a life outside that fantasy framework. Though as lawyer Hifumi Okunuki pointed out in a Japan Times article on Jan. 22, such an arrangement is probably illegal under Japanese labor laws."

=== Return ===
On August 24, 2013, AKB48 announced the reinstatement of Team 4, with Minegishi reinstated as a full member as well as the captain; the rest of the members were promoted from the 13th and 14th generation trainees, later affectionately known as the "Minegishi Children" (峯岸チルドレン).

=== Graduation ===
On December 8, 2019, Minegishi announced her graduation. Her graduation concert was initially scheduled to occur on April 2, 2020 at Yokohama Arena, but was postponed due to the COVID-19 pandemic. Her graduation song, "Mata Aeru Hi Made" (また会える日まで; "Until The Day We Meet Again"), was included in AKB48's 57th single "Shitsuren, Arigatō", released on March 18, 2020.

Her postponed concert was eventually rescheduled to May 22, 2021, and held at Pia Arena MM in Yokohama. She officially graduated from AKB48 on May 28, ending her 16-year membership with the group.

== Personal life ==
Minegishi was born and raised in Takashimadaira in Itabashi, Tokyo. Her parents own and manage a craft beer pub in the area named Kirigirisu, which closed down on 31 August 2026.

On August 16, 2022, Minegishi announced her marriage to Tokai On Air leader Tetsuya Oyaizu. In December 2022, she launched her own skincare brand, etoma (いとま).

On March 1, 2024, Minegishi announced through her social media account that she and Tetsuya are expecting their first child together. She gave birth to a daughter in July 2024.

== Discography ==
=== Singles with AKB48 ===
Year	No.	Title	Role	Notes
2006	Ind-1	"Sakura no Hanabiratachi"	A-side	Debut with Team A.
2006	Ind-2	"Skirt, Hirari"	Supporting	Backup dancer role in title track.
2006	1	"Aitakatta"	A-side	
2007	2	"Seifuku ga Jama o Suru"	A-side	
2007	3	"Keibetsu Shiteita Aijō"	A-side	
2007	4	"Bingo!"	A-side	
2007	5	"Boku no Taiyō"	A-side	
2007	6	"Yūhi o Miteiru ka?"	A-side	
2008	7	"Romance, Irane"	A-side	
2008	8	"Sakura no Hanabiratachi 2008"	A-side	
2008	9	"Baby! Baby! Baby!"	A-side	
2008	10	"Ōgoe Diamond"	A-side	
2009	11	"10nen Sakura"	A-side	
2009	12	"Namida Surprise!"	A-side	
2009	13	"Iiwake Maybe"	A-side	Ranked 16th in 2009 General Election.
2009	14	"River"	A-side	
2010	15	"Sakura no Shiori"	A-side	First single as Team K. Also sang on "Majisuka Rock 'n' Roll".
2010	16	"Ponytail to Shushu"	A-side	
2010	17	"Heavy Rotation"	A-side	Ranked 14th in 2010 General Election. Also sang on "Yasai Sisters" and "Lucky Seven".
2010	18	"Beginner"	A-side	
2010	19	"Chance no Junban"	B-side	Did not sing on title track; lineup was determined by rock-paper-scissors tournament. Sang on "Yoyakushita Christmas"; and "Alive" with Team K.
2011	20	"Sakura no Ki ni Narō"	A-side	
2011	--	"Dareka no Tame ni - What can I do for someone?"	--	charity single
2011	21	"Everyday, Katyusha"	A-side	Also sang on "Korekara Wonderland" and "Yankee Soul".
2011	22	"Flying Get"	A-side	Ranked 15th in 2011 General Election.
2011	23	"Kaze wa Fuiteiru"	A-side	
2011	24	"Ue kara Mariko"	A-side	Placed third in rock-paper-scissors tournament; She also sang on "Noël no Yoru"; and on "Zero-sum Taiyō" as Team K.
2012	25	"Give Me Five!"	A-side (Baby Blossom)	Played trombone in Baby Blossom; She also sang "Hitsujikai no Tabi" as part of Special Girls B.
2012	26	"Manatsu no Sounds Good!"	A-side	
2012	27	"Gingham Check"	A-side	Ranked 14th in 2012 General Election. Also sang on "Yume no Kawa".
2012	28	"Uza"	A-side	Also sang on "Seigi no Mikata ja Nai Hero" as New Team B.
2012	29	"Eien Pressure"	B-side	Did not sing on title track; lineup was determined by rock-paper-scissors tournament. First single as member of Team B. She sang on "Totteoki Christmas"; and "Eien Yori Tsuzuku Yō ni" as part of OKL48.
2013	30	"So Long!"	A-side	She also sang on "Sokode inu no unchi fun jau ka ne?" as Team B.
2013	31	"Sayonara Crawl"	B-side	First single after being demoted to trainee. Did not sing on title track. She sang on "Haste to Waste" and "Love Shugyou".
2013	32	"Koi Suru Fortune Cookie"	Under Girls	Ranked 18th in 2013 General Election. Did not sing on title track. Sang on "Ai no Imi wo Kangaete Mita" as part of the Under Girls. Sang on "Namida no Sei Janai" and "Saigo no Door".
2013	33	"Heart Electric"	A-side	In main lineup as "Barbara". Also sang on "Seijun Philosophy" as Team 4.
2013	34	"Suzukake no Ki no Michi de "Kimi no Hohoemi o Yume ni Miru" to Itte Shimattara Bokutachi no Kankei wa Dō Kawatte Shimau no ka, Bokunari ni Nannichi ka Kangaeta Ue de no Yaya Kihazukashii Ketsuron no Yō na Mono"	B-side	Lost in rock-paper-scissors tournament. Sang "Mosh&Dive" and "Party is over" as AKB48.
2014	35	"Mae Shika Mukanee"	A-side	
2014	36	"Labrador Retriever"	A-side	Also sang on "Heart no Dasshutsu Game" as Team 4.
2014	37	"Kokoro no Placard"	Under Girls	Ranked 22nd in 2014 General Election. Sang on "Dareka ga Nageta Ball"
2014	38	"Kibōteki Refrain"	A-Side	Also sang "Me wo Akete Mama no First Kiss" as Team 4.
2015	39	"Green Flash"	B-Side	Sang on "Haru no Hikari Chikadzuita Natsu" as AKB48.
2015	40	"Bokutachi wa Tatakawanai"	A-Side	Sang on "Bokutachi wa Tatakawanai" without participating in the music video. Also sang on "Summer Side" as Selection 16.
2015	41	"Halloween Night"	Under Girls	Ranked 19th in 2015 General Election. Sang on "Sayonara Surfboard"
2015	42	"Kuchibiru ni Be My Baby"	A-Side	Sang on "Kuchibiru ni Be My Baby" but only appeared briefly in the music video due to work commitments. Also sang on "Senaka Kotoba" and "Oneesan no Hitorigoto" as Team K.
2016	43	"Kimi wa Melody"	A-side	
2016	44	"Tsubasa wa Iranai"	A-side	Sang on "Aishū no Trumpeter" as Team K.
2016	45	"Love Trip / Shiawase wo Wakenasai"	Under Girls	Placed 17th in 2016 General Election. Sang on "Densetsu no Sakana" as Under Girls.
2016	46	"High Tension"	B-side	Sang on "Mata Anata no Koto o Kangaeteta"
2017	47	"Shoot Sign"	A-side	
2017	48	"Negaigoto no Mochigusare"	A-side	Also sang on "Ano Koro no Gohyakuendama"
2017	49	"#sukinanda"	Under Girls	Placed 19th in 2017 General Election. Sang on "Darashinai Aishikata"
2017	50	"11gatsu no Anklet"	A-side	Also sang on "Yosougai no Story"
2018	52	"Teacher Teacher"	B-side	Sang on "Shuuden no Yoru" as Team K
2018	53	"Sentimental Train"	Under Girls	Placed 32nd in 2018 General Election. Sang on "Sandal ja Dekinai Koi"
2018	54	"No Way Man"	B-side	Sang on "Ike no Mizu wo Nukitai" as Ike no Mizu Senbatsu
2020	57	"Shitsuren, Arigatō"	A-side	Also sang on "Mada Aeru Hi Made", her graduation song

=== Albums with AKB48 ===
Kamikyokutachi

- "Baby! Baby! Baby! Baby!"
- "Kimi to Niji to Taiyō to"

Koko ni Ita Koto

- "Shōjotachi yo"
- "Boku ni Dekiru Koto" (Team K)
- "Kaze no Yukue"
- "Koko ni Ita Koto"

1830m

- "First Rabbit"
- "Iede no Yoru" (Team K)
- "Itterasshai"
- "Aozora yo Sabishikunai Ka?" (AKB48 + SKE48 + NMB48 + HKT48)

Tsugi no Ashiato

- "After Rain"
- "Team Zaka" (Team 4)
- "Ichi ni no San"

Koko ga Rhodes da, Koko de Tobe!

- "Ai no Sonzai"
- "Panama Unga"
- "Namida wa Atomawashi"

0 to 1 no Aida

- "Ai no Shisha" (Team K)

== Filmography ==
=== Films ===
- Ashita no Watashi no Tsukurikata (2007)
- Densen Uta (2007)
- Moshidora (2011)
- Documentary of AKB48: Show Must Go On (2012)
- Documentary of AKB48: No Flower Without Rain (2013)
- Joshikō (2016)
- Owari ga Hajimari (2021)

=== Television ===
- Joshideka!: Joshi Keiji (TBS, 2007)
- Guren Onna (episode 5: guest appearance only) (TV Tokyo, 2008)
- Cat Street (NHK, 2008), Yukari
- Mendol: Ikemen Idol (TV Tokyo, 2008), Hinata Otowa/Kū
- Koi Shite Akuma: Vampire Boy (KTV, 2009), Saki Inaba
- Majisuka Gakuen (TV Tokyo, 2010), herself
- Sakura Kara no Tegami: AKB48 Sorezore no Sotsugyō Monogatari (Nippon TV, 2011), herself
- Majisuka Gakuen 2 (TV Tokyo, 2011), Shaku(ex-student president)
- Soup Curry (HBC and TBS, 2012), Megumi Natsukawa
- So Long! (NTV, 2013), Mitsuki Watase
- Aoyama 1-seg Kaihatsu (NHK, 2014–2015), Nana Kawahara
- AKB Horror Night: Adrenaline's Night Ep.35 - Claim (2016), Kyōko
- AKB Love Night: Love Factory Ep.9 - Way Back Home (2016), Aika
- Last One Standing (Netflix, 2022), herself
- AKB48 Sayonara Mōri-san (Nippon TV, 2022–present), regular

== Bibliography ==
=== Photobooks ===
- B.L.T. U-17 Vol.7 summer (7 August 2008, Tokyo News Service) ISBN 9784863360174
- South (23 August 2008, Wani Books) ISBN 9784847041204
- 私は私 : 峯岸みなみフォト&エッセイ (19 July 2016, Takeshobo) ISBN 9784801908116
