= Shoot Sign =

Single by AKB48

from the album Bokutachi wa, Ano Hi no Yoake wo Shitteiru
- A-side: "Shoot Sign"
- Released: March 15, 2017
- Genre: J-pop
- Length: 4:33
- Label: You, Be Cool! / King; Genie Music; Stone Music Entertainment
- Songwriter(s): Yasushi Akimoto (lyrics); Keiichi Kondo (music)
- Producer(s): Yasushi Akimoto

AKB48 singles chronology
"High Tension" (2016)	"Shoot Sign" (2017)	"Negaigoto no Mochigusare" (2017)

Music video
- "Shoot Sign" (Short Ver.) on YouTube

Shoot Sign (シュートサイン, Shūto Sain, "Finger Gun") is the 47th single by Japanese idol girl group AKB48. It was released in Japan on 15 March 2017. The title song is used as the theme song of their drama Tofu Pro-Wrestling premiered on January 21, 2017.

== History ==
The release of the single was announced at an AKB48's handshake meeting held at Pacifico Yokohama on 4 February 2017. The list of the 32 members who will participate on the title track was also announced at the same meeting. Haruna Kojima was announced as the center performer for the title track, her first time in two years, and third time overall and also her final appearance on an AKB48 Single. This is the first single to release after Shimazaki Haruka graduated from the group.

It sold 933,969 copies on its first day, less than their previous single, "High Tension".

Four days before official release of "Shoot Sign", AKB48 performed for the first time their 48th and upcoming single "Negaigoto no Mochigusare" during NCON (a school choir contest promoted by NHK).

== Music video ==
The complete version of the music video premiered on Japanese Space Shower TV on March 3, 2017. Lasting 7 minutes and 6 seconds, is directed by Yoshito Mori and is linked directly by the series. The main set for this music video is a WIP (World Idol Pro-Wrestling) ring. (Note: Brazilian cable channel PlayTV did not air the full version of "Shoot Sign" music video on Interferência Ichiban on March 6, 2017. The full version was released on June 1, but PlayTV declined to broadcast.)

== Track listings ==
All lyrics by Yasushi Akimoto.

=== Type A ===
CD
No.	Title	Music	Arrangement	Length
1.	"Shoot Sign" (シュートサイン)	Keiichi Kondo	Hiroshi Sasaki	4:33
2.	"Kidzuka Renai yō ni..." (気づかれないように...) (performed by Haruna Kojima)
3.	"Vacancy" ((performed by SKE48)
4.	"Shoot Sign off vocal ver."
5.	"Kidzuka Renai yō ni... off vocal ver."
6.	"Vacancy off vocal ver."

DVD
No.	Title	Length
1.	"Shoot Sign Music Video"
2.	"Kidzuka Renai yō ni... Music Video"
3.	"Vacancy Music Video"

=== Type B ===
CD
No.	Title	Length
1.	"Shoot Sign" (シュートサイン)
2.	"Kidzuka Renai yō ni..." (気づかれないように...) (performed by Haruna Kojima)
3.	"Mayonaka no Tsuyogari" (真夜中の強がり) (performed by NMB48)
4.	"Shoot Sign off vocal ver."
5.	"Kidzuka Renai yō ni... off vocal ver."
6.	"Mayonaka no Tsuyogari off vocal ver."

DVD
No.	Title	Length
1.	"Shoot Sign Music Video"
2.	"Kidzuka Renai yō ni... Music Video"
3.	"Mayonaka no Tsuyogari Music Video"

=== Type C ===
CD
No.	Title	Length
1.	"Shoot Sign" (シュートサイン)
2.	"Kidzuka Renai yō ni..." (気づかれないように...) (performed by Haruna Kojima)
3.	"Tomaranai Kanransha" (止まらない観覧車) (performed by HKT48)
4.	"Shoot Sign off vocal ver."
5.	"Kidzuka Renai yō ni... off vocal ver."
6.	"Tomaranai Kanransha off vocal ver."

DVD
No.	Title	Length
1.	"Shoot Sign Music Video"
2.	"Kidzuka Renai yō ni... Music Video"
3.	"Tomaranai Kanransha Music Video"

=== Type D ===
CD
No.	Title	Length
1.	"Shoot Sign" (シュートサイン)
2.	"Accident Chu" (アクシデント中) (performed by AKB48 U-19)
3.	"Midori to Mori no Undokōen" (みどりと森の運動公園) (performed by NGT48)
4.	"Shoot Sign off vocal ver."
5.	"Kidzuka Renai yō ni... off vocal ver."
6.	"Midori to Mori no Undokōen off vocal ver."

DVD
No.	Title	Length
1.	"Shoot Sign Music Video"
2.	"Kidzuka Renai yō ni... Music Video"
3.	"Midori to Mori no Undokōen Music Video"

=== Type E ===
CD
No.	Title	Length
1.	"Shoot Sign" (シュートサイン)
2.	"Accident Chu" (アクシデント中) (performed by AKB48 U-19)
3.	"Dare no Koto wo Ichiban Aishiteru?" (誰のことを一番 愛してる?)) (performed by Sakamichi AKB)
4.	"Shoot Sign off vocal ver."
5.	"Kidzuka Renai yō ni... off vocal ver."
6.	"Dare no Koto wo Ichiban Aishiteru? off vocal ver."

DVD
No.	Title	Length
1.	"Shoot Sign Music Video"
2.	"Kidzuka Renai yō ni... Music Video"
3.	"Dare no Koto wo Ichiban Aishiteru? Music Video"

=== Theater Edition ===
CD only (the theater edition doesn't include a bonus DVD)
No.	Title	Music	Arrangement	Length
1.	"Shoot Sign" (シュートサイン)	Keiichi Kondo	Hiroshi Sasaki	4:33
2.	"Kidzuka Renai yō ni..." (気づかれないように...) (performed by Haruna Kojima)
3.	"Kanashii Uta o Kikitaku Natta" (悲しい歌を聴きたくなった)) (performed by MayuYukirin)
4.	"Shoot Sign off vocal ver."
5.	"Kidzuka Renai yō ni... off vocal ver."
6.	"Kanashii Uta wo Kikitaku Natta off vocal ver."

== Senbatsu ==
=== Shoot Sign ===
- Team A: Haruna Kojima (Center), (Last Single), Anna Iriyama, Shizuka Ōya, Yui Yokoyama
- Team K: Minami Minegishi, Mion Mukaichi, Tomu Muto
- Team B: Yuki Kashiwagi, Rena Kato, Yuria Kizaki, Mayu Watanabe
- Team 4: Nana Okada, Saya Kawamoto, Mako Kojima, Haruka Komiyama, Juri Takahashi
- Team 8: Yui Oguri, Momoka Onishi
- SKE48 Team S: Jurina Matsui
- SKE48 Team E: Rara Goto, Akari Suda
- NMB48 Team N: Miori Ichikawa, Ayaka Yamamoto, Sayaka Yamamoto
- NMB48 Team M: Miru Shiroma, Akari Yoshida
- HKT48 Team H: Haruka Kodama, Rino Sashihara
- HKT48 Team KIV: Sakura Miyawaki
- NGT48 Team NIII: Rie Kitahara, Rika Nakai

=== Kidzuka Renai you ni... ===
Sung by Haruna Kojima as her graduation song from the group.

- Team A: Haruna Kojima

=== Accident Chu ===
Sung by AKB48's U-19 Senbatsu, with the members being under the age of 19 at the time of this single's release.

- Team A: Megu Taniguchi, Yui Hiwatashi
- Team K: Mion Mukaichi (Center)
- Team B: Rena Kato, Moe Goto, Seina Fukuoka
- Team 4: Nana Okada, Saya Kawamoto, Mako Kojima, Haruka Komiyama, Juri Takahashi, Yuiri Murayama
- Team 8: Yui Oguri, Narumi Kuranoo, Nagisa Sakaguchi, Nanami Sato
- Team Kenkyuusei: Satone Kubo, Erii Chiba

=== Vacancy ===
Sung by SKE48.

- Team S: Ryoha Kitagawa, Haruka Futamura, Jurina Matsui (Center)
- Team KII: Yuna Ego, Mina Oba, Yuna Obata, Sarina Souda, Akane Takayanagi, Nao Furuhata, Kaori Matsumura
- Team E: Kanon Kimoto, Haruka Kumazaki, Rara Goto, Makiko Saito, Maya Sugawara, Akari Suda, Marika Tani

=== Mayonaka no Tsuyogari ===
Sung by NMB48.

- Team N: Miori Ichikawa, Kei Jonishi, Ririka Sutou, Airi Tanigawa, Shu Yabushita, Ayaka Yamamoto, Sayaka Yamamoto
- Team M: Yuuka Kato, Momoka Kinoshita, Miru Shiroma (Center), Nagisa Shibuya, Akari Yoshida
- Team BII: Azusa Uemura, Yuuri Ota, Ayaka Okita, Reina Fujie, Sae Murase, Fuuko Yagura

=== Tomaranai Kanransha ===
Sung by HKT48.

- Team H: Yuriya Inoue, Yui Kojina, Haruka Kodama (Center), Rino Sashihara, Meru Tashima, Miku Tanaka, Natsumi Matsuoka, Nako Yabuki
- Team KIV: Yuka Tanaka, Mio Tomonaga, Mai Fuchigami, Sakura Miyawaki, Aoi Motomura, Madoka Moriyasu
- Team TII: Sae Kurihara, Hana Matsuoka, Emiri Yamashita
- Team Kenkyuusei: Tomoka Takeda

=== Midori to Mori no Undokouen ===
Sung by NGT48.

- Team NIII: Yuka Ogino, Tsugumi Oguma, Yuki Kashiwagi, Minami Kato, Rie Kitahara, Anju Sato, Riko Sugahara, Moeka Takakura (Center), Ayaka Tano, Rika Nakai, Marina Nishigata, Rena Hasegawa, Hinata Homma, Fuka Murakamo, Maho Yamaguchi, Noe Yamada
- NGT48 Kenkyuusei: Yuria Otaki, Yuria Kado, Aina Kusakabe, Reina Seiji, Mau Takahashi, Ayuka Nakamura, Miharu Nara, Nanako Nishimura, Ayaka Mizusawa, Aya Miyajima

=== Dare no Koto wo Ichiban Aishiteru? ===
Sung by SakamichiAKB, with the members consisting of AKB48 and Sakamichi Series members.

- Team K: Mion Mukaichi
- Team 4: Nana Okada, Mako Kojima
- Team 8: Yui Oguri
- Team S: Jurina Matsui
- Nogizaka46 1st Generation: Marika Itō, Asuka Saitō, Minami Hoshino
- Nogizaka46 2nd Generation: Hinako Kitano, Ranze Terada, Miona Hori
- Kanji Keyakizaka46: Yui Imaizumi, Yūka Sugai, Yurina Hirate (Center), Rika Watanabe, Risa Watanabe
- Hiragana Keyakizaka46: Neru Nagahama

=== Kanashii Uta wo Kikitaku Natta ===
Sung by MayuYukirin, who are known to have a good relationship with one another.

- Team B: Mayu Watanabe, Yuki Kashiwagi

== Release history ==
Region	Date	Format	Label
Japan	March 15, 2017	CD; digital download; streaming	King Records (YOU BE COOL division)
Hong Kong, Taiwan	March 15, 2017	CD; digital download; streaming	King Records
South Korea	August 31, 2018	digital download; streaming	Stone Music Entertainment; Genie Music; King
