= Seimei/Still Alive =

Single by B'z

from the album Dinosaur
- B-side: "Sekai wa Anata no Iro ni Naru" and "Fukiarenasa"
- Released: June 14, 2017
- Genre: Hard rock, pop rock
- Length: 17:21
- Label: Vermillion Records

B'z singles chronology
"Red" (2015)	"Seimei/Still Alive" (2017)

Music videos
- "Seimei" (partial) on YouTube
- "Still Alive" (partial) on YouTube

"声明/Still Alive (Seimei/Still Alive)" is the fifty-third single by Japanese rock duo B'z. It was released on 14 June 2017 and is the only single from their twentieth album Dinosaur.

The song "Seimei" was used in a UCC Ueshima Coffee Co. Black sugar-free coffee commercial. "Still Alive" served as the main theme to TBS's A LIFE〜Itoshi Kihito〜, "Sekai wa Anata no Iro ni Naru" as the theme song to 2016 film Detective Conan: The Darkest Nightmare and to the anime itself and "Fukiarenasai" as the theme song for the 2016 film Shippu Rondo.

It debuted at number one on the weekly Oricon Singles Chart. It also reached number one on the Billboard Japan Hot 100 and the Top Singles Sales chart. It was ranked #38 at Oricon's 2017 year-end chart. The Recording Industry Association of Japan certified the single Gold for its sales of 100,000 copies.

== Track listing ==
No.	Title	Length
1.	"声明 (Seimei)" (Declaration)	3:37
2.	"Still Alive"	4:42
3.	"世界はあなたの色になる (Sekai wa Anata no Iro ni Naru)" (The Color This World Will Take Depends on You)	5:01
4.	"フキアレナサイ (Fukiarenasai)" (Blow Violently)	4:01
Total length:		17:21

== Certifications ==
Region	Certification	Certified units/sales
Japan (RIAJ)	Gold	100,000^{^}
^{^} Shipments figures based on certification alone.
