= Sekai wa Doko Made Aozora na no ka? =

Single by NGT48
- Released: December 6, 2017
- Genre: J-Pop
- Label: Ariola Japan / Sony Music Entertainment Japan

NGT48 singles chronology
"Seishun Dokei" (2017)	"Sekai wa Doko Made Aozora na no ka?" (2017)	"Haru wa Doko Kara Kuru no ka?" (2017)

"Sekai wa Doko Made Aozora na no ka?" (世界はどこまで青空なのか？, "Where does the blue sky of the world end?") is the second single by Japanese idol girl group NGT48. It will be released on December 6, 2017.

== Release and promotion ==
The CD will be released in multiple different editions: three limited editions (Type A, Type B, Type C) and four regular editions (Type A, Type B, Type and "Regular Edition").

The center for this single is Yuka Ogino, who has previously ranked fifth in AKB48's General Election (Senbatsu Sousenkyou).

== Track listing ==
=== Type A ===
No.	Title	Length
1.	"世界はどこまで青空なのか？ (Sekai wa Doko Made Aozora na no ka?) (Senbatsu)"
2.	"僕の涙は流れない (Boku no Namida wa Nagarenai) (SNS Senbatsu)"
3.	"大人になる前に (Otona ni Naru Mae ni) (Gakusei Senbatsu)"
4.	"世界はどこまで青空なのか？ (off-vocal)"
5.	"僕の涙は流れない (off-vocal)"
6.	"大人になる前に (off-vocal)"

DVD (Limited Edition)
No.	Title	Length
1.	"世界はどこまで青空なのか？ (Music Video)"
2.	"僕の涙は流れない (Music Video)"
3.	"大人になる前に (Music Video"

=== Type B ===
No.	Title	Length
1.	"世界はどこまで青空なのか？ (Sekai wa Doko Made Aozora na no ka?) (Senbatsu)"
2.	"僕の涙は流れない (Boku no Namida wa Nagarenai) (SNS Senbatsu)"
3.	"TBA"
4.	"世界はどこまで青空なのか？ (off-vocal)"
5.	"僕の涙は流れない (off-vocal)"
6.	"TBA"

DVD (Limited Edition)
No.	Title	Length
1.	"世界はどこまで青空なのか？ (Music Video)"
2.	"僕の涙は流れない (Music Video)"
3.	"TBA"

=== Type C ===
No.	Title	Length
1.	"世界はどこまで青空なのか？ (Sekai wa Doko Made Aozora na no ka?) (Senbatsu)"
2.	"僕の涙は流れない (Boku no Namida wa Nagarenai) (SNS Senbatsu)"
3.	"ナニカガイル (Nani ka ga Iru) (NGT48)"
4.	"世界はどこまで青空なのか？ (off-vocal)"
5.	"僕の涙は流れない (off-vocal)"
6.	"ナニカガイル (off-vocal)"

DVD (Limited Edition)
No.	Title	Length
1.	"世界はどこまで青空なのか？ (Music Video)"
2.	"僕の涙は流れない (Music Video)"
3.	"ナニカガイル (Music Video)"

=== Regular Edition ===
No.	Title	Length
1.	"世界はどこまで青空なのか？ (Sekai wa Doko Made Aozora na no ka?) (Senbatsu)"
2.	"僕の涙は流れない (Boku no Namida wa Nagarenai) (SNS Senbatsu)"
3.	"ぎこちない通学電車 (Gikochinai Tsuugaku Densha) (Furusato Team)"
4.	"世界はどこまで青空なのか？ (off-vocal)"
5.	"僕の涙は流れない (off-vocal)"
6.	"ぎこちない通学電車 (off-vocal)"

== Senbatsu ==
- Team NIII: Yuka Ogino, Tsugumu Oguma, Yuki Kashiwagi, Minami Kato, Rie Kitahara, Anju Sato, Riko Sugahara, Moeka Takakura, Ayaka Tano, Rika Nakai, Marina Nishigata, Rea Hasegawa, Hinata Homma, Fuka Murakumo, Maho Yamaguchi, Noe Yamada
- NGT48 Kenkyuusei: Yuria Kado, Miyajima Aya
