= Mizuki Yamauchi =

- 山内 瑞葵
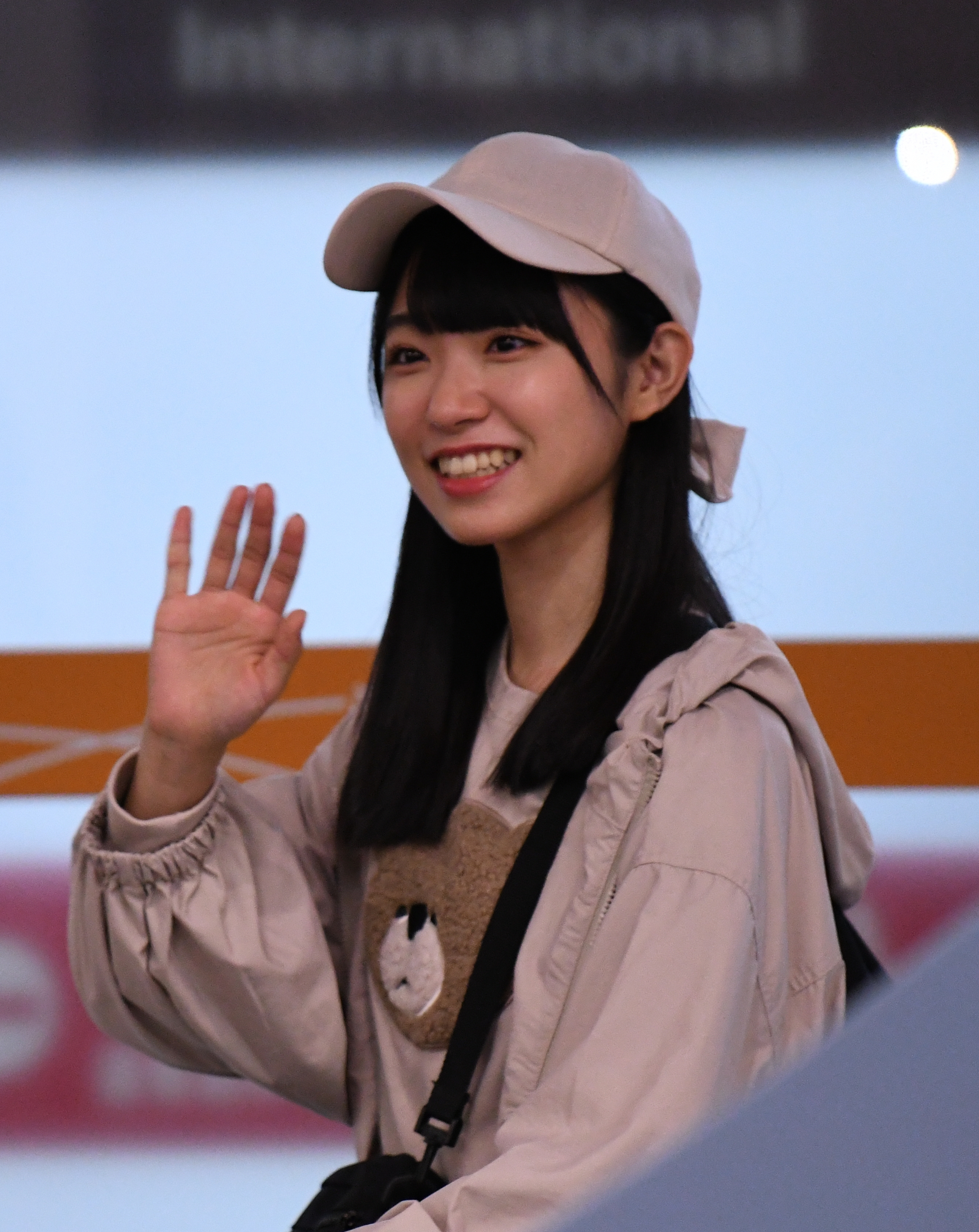
- Yamauchi in 2019
- Born: September 20, 2001 (age 25); Tokyo, Japan
- Other name: Zukky
- Occupations: Singer; Actress
- Agent: Avex AY Factory
- Musical career
- Genre: J-pop
- Instrument: Vocals
- Member of: AKB48
- Website: Official website

Mizuki Yamauchi (山内 瑞葵, Yamauchi Mizuki; born 20 September 2001), also known by her nickname Zukky (ずっきー), is a Japanese singer and actress. She is a member of the idol group AKB48.

== Early life ==
Yamauchi was born on 20 September 2001 in Tokyo. She began performing on stage in the second grade of elementary school and continued in musical productions through middle school, intending at the time to pursue a career in musical theatre. In the sixth grade she appeared as Young Nala in the Shiki Theatre Company production of The Lion King. During the production she met then-HKT48 member Sakura Miyawaki, who had previously played the same role. The encounter inspired her to pursue an idol career, and she passed the audition for AKB48’s 16th generation while in the third year of middle school.

== Career ==
=== AKB48 ===
Yamauchi was first selected for AKB48’s senbatsu lineup for the 52nd single “Teacher Teacher”, released in 2018.

In January 2020 she was selected as the center of AKB48’s 57th single “Shitsuren, Arigatou” (失恋、ありがとう), released on 18 March 2020. This was her first time as center of a title track. In a 2020 interview, Yamauchi described becoming center as the fulfillment of a long-held goal she had pursued since joining the group.

In March 2026 she joined the agency Avex AY Factory.

=== Acting career ===
In 2023, Yamauchi made her film debut in the youth road movie Girls Drive (ガールズドライブ), in which she played Yuka Fuchigami. She starred alongside fellow AKB48 members Yui Oguri, Narumi Kuranoo, and Sora Yamazaki.

In 2025 she co-starred as Nishina Nanami in the film Father and Daughter’s Seven Days War (父と娘の7日間戦争), which began screening on 19 December 2025. In 2026 she played the heroine Niimoto Yoshimi in Ondemand (オンデマンド) and starred as Yūki Sakura in Kioku (キオク), directed by Ikuto Katsumata and released on 16 October 2026. She played the younger sister who cares for her older brother after a traffic accident leaves him with memory loss. Interviews discussed how she drew on her relationship with her own older brother and the challenges of portraying emotions she had not previously experienced.

== Filmography ==
=== Films ===
Year	Title	Role	Notes	Ref.
2023	Girls Drive (ガールズドライブ)	Yuka Fuchigami (渕上由佳)	Film debut; one of four leads	
2025	Father and Daughter’s Seven Days War (父と娘の7日間戦争)	Nishina Nanami (仁科奈々実)	Co-lead	
2026	Ondemand (オンデマンド)	Niimoto Yoshimi (新本好)	Heroine	
2026	Kioku (キオク)	Yūki Sakura (優木桜)	Lead	
