= Sukinanda =

"#SukiNanda"

Single by AKB48

from the album Bokutachi wa, Ano Hi no Yoake wo Shitteiru
- Released: August 30, 2017
- Genre: J-pop
- Length: 4:30
- Label: You, Be Cool! / King; Genie Music; Stone Music Entertainment
- Producer: Yasushi Akimoto

AKB48 singles chronology
"Negaigoto no Mochigusare" (2017)	"#SukiNanda" (2017)	"11gatsu no Anklet" (2017)

Music video
- "#sukinanda" on YouTube

"#SukiNanda" (＃好きなんだ; lit. "Hashtag I Like You") is the 49th single by Japanese idol girl group AKB48. It was released in Japan on August 30, 2017.

The single sold 1,036,551 physical copies on its first day according to Oricon.

== Track listings ==
All lyrics by Yasushi Akimoto.

=== Type A ===
CD
No.	Title	Length
1.	"#sukinanda" (#好きなんだ)	4:30
2.	"Darashinai Aishikata" (だらしない愛し方) (performed by Undergirls)
3.	"Tomadotte Tameratte" (戸惑ってためらって) (performed by Next Girls)
4.	"#sukinanda off vocal ver."
5.	"Darashinai Aishikata off vocal ver."
6.	"Tomadotte Tameratte off vocal ver."

DVD
No.	Title	Length
1.	"#sukinanda Music Video"
2.	"Darashinai Aishikata Music Video"
3.	"Tomadotte Tameratte Music Video"

=== Type B ===
CD
No.	Title	Length
1.	"#sukinanda" (#好きなんだ)
2.	"Darashinai Aishikata" (だらしない愛し方) (performed by Future Girls)
3.	"Jibuntachi no Koi ni Kagitte" (自分たちの恋に限って) (performed by Next Girls)
4.	"#sukinanda off vocal ver."
5.	"Darashinai Aishikata off vocal ver."
6.	"Jibuntachi no Koi ni Kagitte off vocal ver."

DVD
No.	Title	Length
1.	"#sukinanda Music Video"
2.	"Darashinai Aishikata Music Video"
3.	"Jibuntachi no Koi ni Kagitte Music Video"

=== Type C ===
CD
No.	Title	Length
1.	"#sukinanda" (#好きなんだ)
2.	"Darashinai Aishikata" (だらしない愛し方) (performed by Future Girls)
3.	"Tsuki no Kamen" (月の仮面) (performed by Upcoming Girls)
4.	"#sukinanda off vocal ver."
5.	"Darashinai Aishikata off vocal ver."
6.	"Tsuki no Kamen off vocal ver."

DVD
No.	Title	Length
1.	"#sukinanda Music Video"
2.	"Darashinai Aishikata Music Video"
3.	"Tsuki no Kamen Music Video"

=== Type D ===
CD
No.	Title	Length
1.	"#sukinanda" (#好きなんだ)
2.	"Darashinai Aishikata" (だらしない愛し方) (performed by Future Girls)
3.	"Private Summer" (プライベートサマー) (performed by Showroom Senbatsu)
4.	"#sukinanda off vocal ver."
5.	"Darashinai Aishikata off vocal ver."
6.	"Private Summer off vocal ver."

DVD
No.	Title	Length
1.	"#sukinanda Music Video"
2.	"Darashinai Aishikata Music Video"
3.	"Private Summer Music Video"

=== Type E ===
CD
No.	Title	Length
1.	"#sukinanda" (#好きなんだ)
2.	"Darashinai Aishikata" (だらしない愛し方) (performed by Future Girls)
3.	"Give Up wa Shinai" (ギブアップはしない) (Tofu Pro Wrestling song)
4.	"#sukinanda off vocal ver."
5.	"Darashinai Aishikata off vocal ver."
6.	"Give Up wa Shinai off vocal ver."

DVD
No.	Title	Length
1.	"#sukinanda Music Video"
2.	"Darashinai Aishikata Music Video"
3.	"Give Up wa Shinai Music Video"

=== Theater edition ===
CD only (the theater edition doesn't include a bonus DVD)
No.	Title	Length
1.	"#sukinanda" (#好きなんだ)
2.	"Darashinai Aishikata" (だらしない愛し方) (performed by Future Girls)
3.	"Dakitsukō ka?" (抱きつこうか？) (performed by AKB48's 16th generation trainees)
4.	"#sukinanda off vocal ver."
5.	"Darashinai Aishikata off vocal ver."
6.	"Dakitsukō ka? off vocal ver."

== Personnel ==
=== "#Sukinanda" ===
Center: Sashihara Rino

- AKB48 Team A: Yui Yokoyama(7)
- AKB48 Team B: Mayu Watanabe(2)
- AKB48 Team 4: Nana Okada(9), Juri Takahashi(11)
- HKT48: Rino Sashihara(1), Sakura Miyawaki(4)
- SKE48: Jurina Matsui(3), Akari Suda(6), Sarina Sōda(8), Nao Furuhata(14), Akane Takayanagi(15)
- NGT48: Yuka Ogino(5), Rie Kitahara(10), Hinata Homma(13)
- NMB48: Miru Shiroma(12), Akari Yoshida(16)

=== "Darashinai Aishikata" ===
Undergirls (アンダーガールズ) (16 Members) (Mion Mukaichi Center)

- Team K: Minegishi Minami, Mion Mukaichi
- Team B: Kato Rena, Fukuoka Seina
- Team 4: Kawamoto Saya, Kojima Mako
- Team 8: Kuranoo Narumi
- Team S: Oya Masana
- Team KII: Mina Oba, Matsumura Kaori
- Team N: Suto Ririka
- Team BII: Ota Yuuri
- Team H: Tanaka Miku
- Team KIV: Moriyasu Madoka
- Team NIII: Takakura Moeka, Nakai Rika

=== "Tomadotte Tameratte" ===
Next Girls (ネクストガールズ) (16 Members) (Kato Yuuka Center)

- Team A: Sasaki Yukari, Taniguchi Megu
- Team 4: Iwatate Saho
- AKB48 Kenkyuusei: Kubo Satone
- Team KII: Yuna Ego
- Team E: Kamata Natsuki, Goto Rara
- Team M: Yuuka Kato
- Team BII: Okita Ayaka, Murase Sae
- Team H: Tashima Meru, Nako Yabuki
- Team KIV: Tomiyoshi Asuka, Tomonaga Mio, Fuchigami Mai
- Team NIII: Nishigata Marina

=== "Jibuntachi no Koi ni Kagitte" ===
Future Girls (フューチャーガールズ) (16 Members) (Sakaguchi Riko Center)

- Team 4: Komiyama Haruka
- Team 8: Oguri Yui
- AKB48 Kenkyuusei: Muto Orin
- Team S: Kitagawa Ryoha
- Team KII: Arai Yuki, Takeuchi Saki
- Team E: Kumazaki Haruka
- Team N: Ichikawa Miori, Tanigawa Airi
- Team M: Shibuya Nagisa
- Team H: Sakaguchi Riko, Tanaka Natsumi, Matsuoka Natsumi
- Team KIV: Ueki Nao, Motomura Aoi
- Team NIII: Maho Yamaguchi

=== "Tsuki no Kamen" ===
Upcoming Girls (アップカミングガールズ) (16 Members) (Ota Nao Center)

- Team A: Hiwatashi Yui
- Team K: Mogi Shinobu
- Team B: Goto Moe
- Team 4: Omori Miyuu
- Team 8: Ota Nao, Sakaguchi Nagisa, Nagano Serika
- Team KII: Obata Yuna

Team E: Sato Sumire, Takahata Yuki, Tani Marika

- Team TII: Matsuoka Hana
- HKT48 Kenkyuusei: Toyonaga Aki
- Team NIII: Kato Minami
- NGT48 Kenkyuusei: Kado Yuria, Miyajima Aya

=== "Private Summer" ===
SHOWROOM Senbatsu (SHOWROOM選抜) (16 Members) (Onishi Momoka Center)

- Team B: Ma Chia-Ling
- Team 8: Ota Nao, Onishi Momoka, Sato Shiori, Shimoaoki Karin
- AKB48 Kenkyuusei: Yamane Suzuha
- SKE48 Kenkyuusei: Nonogaki Miki
- Team N: Naiki Kokoro
- Team NIII: Ogino Yuka, Nakai Rika, Nishigata Marina
- NGT48 Kenkyuusei: Nakamura Ayuka, Nara Miharu
- STU: Sano Haruka, Fukuda Akari, Mori Kaho

=== "Give Up wa Shinai" ===
Tofu Pro Wrestling (豆腐プロレス) (9 Members) (Hollywood JURINA & Cherry Miyawaki Centers)

- Team A: Long Speech Yokoyama Yui
- Team K: Jumbo Haruka Shimada, Blackberry Mion Mukaichi
- Team B: Papparra Kizaki Yuria, Cutie Renacchi Kato Rena
- Team S: Hollywood JURINA Jurina Matsui
- Team KII: Sax Nao Furuhata
- Team M: Doutonbori Miru Shiroma
- Team KIV: Cherry Sakura Miyawaki

=== "Dakitsukouka?" ===
16th Generation (16期生) (18 Members) (Asai Nanami & Yamauchi Mizuki Center)

- Kenkyuusei: Asai Nanami, Inagaki Kaori, Umemoto Izumi, Kurosu Haruka, Sato Minami, Shoji Nagisa, Suzuki Kurumi, Taguchi Manaka, Taya Misaki, Nagatomo Ayami, Harima Nanami, Homma Mai, Maeda Ayaka, Michieda Saki, Muto Orin, Yasuda Kana, Yamauchi Mizuki, Yamane Suzuha

== Release history ==
Region	Date	Format	Label
Japan	August 30, 2017	CD; digital download; streaming	King Records (YOU BE COOL division)
Hong Kong, Taiwan	August 30, 2017	CD; digital download; streaming	King Records
South Korea	August 24, 2018	digital download; streaming	Stone Music Entertainment; Genie Music; King

== Versions by foreign sister groups ==
On November 9, 2024, a Thai version of "#sukinanda" was released by BNK48.

On February 2, 2025, an Indonesian version of "#sukinanda" was released by JKT48 under the translated title "#KuSangatSuka."

In 2026, a Mandarin Chinese version of "#sukinanda" will be released by TSH48 as part of their 12th EP, First Rabbit (最初的兔子; Zuìchū de Tùzi).
