= Rena Hasegawa =

Japanese voice actress, singer and former idol group member

- 長谷川 玲奈
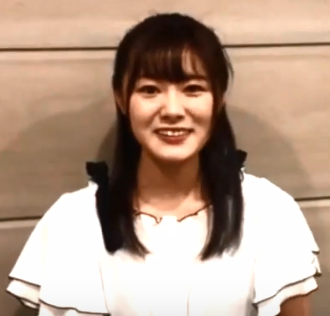
- Hasegawa in 2018
- Born: March 15, 2001 (age 25); Tainai, Niigata Prefecture, Japan
- Occupation: Voice actress
- Years active: 2016-present
- Agent: Crocodile Ltd.
- Musical career
- Genre: J-pop
- Instrument: Vocals
- Label: Ariola Japan
- Website: www.crocodile-ltd.com/talent/hasegawa-rena

Rena Hasegawa (長谷川 玲奈, Hasegawa Rena; born March 15, 2001) is a Japanese voice actress. Hasegawa started her career as a member of the idol girl group NGT48 in 2015, debuting as a regular member of the group's Team NIII. In 2018, she was transferred to Team G, which later merged with Team NIII to become a unified first generation in 2019. On May 18, 2019, she left the group to pursue voice acting.

== Early life ==
From her fourth year in elementary school to her third year in middle school, Hasegawa played baseball on a co-ed team, in which she served as second baseman. After leaving the school's baseball club, she subsequently joined into the track and field group, where she received offers from over 10 different schools as a result of her achievements.

== Career ==
=== Music career ===
Hasegawa auditioned for AKB48's then-upcoming Niigata-based sister group, NGT48, having been fascinated with idols after she watched AKB0048. After passing the audition for the group's first generation on July 25, 2015, at the opening show of NGT48's theater on January 10, 2016, she debuted as a regular member of the newly established Team NIII. As part of NGT48, she subsequently made her major label debut on April 12, 2017, with the single "Seishun Dokei." In 2018, Hasegawa appeared in the live-action film adaptation of the novel Midnight Bus. She was later transferred to the group's newly established Team G. She also participated in the South Korean reality competition series, Produce 48, representing NGT48 with Team NIII's Yamada Noe. Hasegawa was eliminated during the first round and finished at 71st place.

In 2019, after Team G co-captain Yamaguchi Maho was forced by the NGT48 management to apologize for publicly alleging that she was assaulted in December 2018, Hasegawa removed "NGT48" off her social media profiles to show support. The NGT48 management responded by merging Team NIII and Team G together into a "first generation" group, with their final performances as their original teams on April 21, 2019. During Team G's performance on April 21, Hasegawa, along with Sugahara Riko, announced her decision to graduate from NGT48 in solidarity with Yamaguchi. Hasegawa held a final performance with Yamaguchi and Sugahara on May 18, 2019.

=== Voice acting career and other post-graduation activities ===
During Hasegawa's graduation speech, she announced she was pursuing voice acting. On June 10, 2019, Hasegawa announced that she signed with Crocodile Ltd. with the help of Yasushi Akimoto. She took voice acting lessons from the sound company BloomZ. She was first assigned as the PR reporter for the second season of Dropkick on My Devil! and later made her voice acting debut as Konomi Seki on Sapporo Otome Gohan.

Since its inception in 2019, Hasegawa also participated in the cross-media project Idol Bu Show, playing the part of the character Kokoro Kakegawa in the correlated radio drama shows and events, among other things, and taking part in the productions of two CD albums as part of the in-story unit X-UC: Current Xanadu, released on January 8, 2020, and Papier Mache Idol, released on October 7, 2020.

This was later followed up in with yet another participation, announced in June 2020, in another cross-media project: Denonbu, produced by Bandai Namco. In it, Hasegawa plays the role of the character Shian Inubousaki.

As a Vtuber, ever since 2019 Hasegawa has been providing voice and movements for the official mascot of the Daiei supermarket group, Mokkun, in the children educational videos published regularly on the mascot's YouTube channel.

A native of Tainai, Hasegawa had been serving since September 2019 also as a tourism PR ambassador for the city to engage in promotional campaigns and events for it, with her appointment being renewed over the subsequent years.

== Filmography ==
=== Voice acting ===
==== Television anime ====
Year	Title	Role	Notes
2019	Dropkick on My Devil!	Herself	PR correspondent
2019	Sapporo Otome Gohan	Konomi Seki	Season 3, 12-episode series aired in the Sapporo area and promoted by the Sapporo Cultural Broadcast. Lead role; debut voice acting role
2020	Science Fell in Love, So I Tried to Prove It	Guest character	Episode 11 appearance
2020	Dropkick on My Devil!! Dash	Guest character	Season 2, episode 3 appearance
2021	WIXOSS Diva (A) Live	Rara Inumiya	
2021	Farewell, My Dear Cramer	Karina Kakogawa	
2021	Koikimo	Rio Amakusa	
2022	Science Fell in Love, So I Tried to Prove It r=1-sinθ	Haru Kagurano	
2022	Dropkick on My Devil! X	Atre	
2023	Tearmoon Empire	Guillo-chin	
2024	Rinkai!	Miko Yahiko	
2024	Plus-Sized Elf	Kuroeda	
2025	Our Last Crusade or the Rise of a New World	Yumilecia	Season 2
2025	Pass the Monster Meat, Milady!	Young Chaos	
2026	The Classroom of a Black Cat and a Witch	Pollux Gemini	

==== Anime movies ====
Year	Title	Role	Notes
2022	Idol Bu Show	Kokoro Kakegawa	

==== Video games ====
Year	Title	Role	Notes
2019	Shishi no Gotoku: Sengoku Haō Senki	Nene	Guest voice
2019	Q&Q Answers	Pipa Jing	
2021	Destiny Child	Driad	
2021	Honkai Impact 3rd	Nagamitsu	
2021	Riichi City	Saeko Igarashi	
2021	Riichi City	Shioka Amami	
2022	BLACK STELLA Iи:FernØ	Chia Kannazuki	
2022	Ni no Kuni: Cross Worlds	Sofie	
2022	WIXOSS Multiverse	VJ.WOLF	
2022	Tokyo 7th Sisters	Flana Ling	
2023	Puzzle Bobble Everybubble!	Kululun/Peb	
2023	Onigiri	Juubei Yagyuu	
2023	BLACK STELLA PTOLOMEA	Chia Kannazuki	
2023	Echocalypse	Note	
2024	Seifuku Kanojo	Kuroda	
2024	Sakurairo Tetraprism	Natsuki Nagamine	
2024	Monster Strike	Lupinus	
2025	Tree of Savior M	Ina Creek	

==== Movie dubbing ====
Year	Title	Role	Notes
2019	Dilili to Paris Jikan Ryokou	Camille Claudel	
2019	Run Away: Hong Kong Dasshutsu	Xiuping	Japanese edition of the movie "Zombiology: Enjoy Yourself Tonight" (Hong Kong, 2017)
2019	Pororo, the Snow Fairy Village Adventure	Pororo	
2020	End of Nightmare	Anton's mother	Japanese edition of the movie "Quiet Comes the Dawn" (Russia, 2019)
2020	Big Wish: Mahou ni Negai wo	Sophia	Japanese edition of the 3D animation movie "Salma's Big Wish" (Mexico, 2019)
2020	Toys & Pets: Minna de Mirai he Dai-bouken	Time Bot	Japanese edition of the 3D animation movie "Tea Pets" (People's Republic of China, 2016)
2020	Magic World: Beast to Yami no Shihaisha	Faye's mother; other	Japanese edition of the movie "The Magic Kids – Three Unlikely Heroes" (Germany, 2020)
2020	Elf to Fushigina Neko	Angela	Japanese edition of the movie "The House Elf" (Russia, 2019)
2021	Element Sisters: Yon-bun no Ichi no Mahou	Verena	Japanese edition of the movie "Four Enchanted Sisters" (Austria, 2020)
2021	Dragon Labyrinth	Shirley Yang	Japanese edition of the "Mojin: Longling Misty Cave" (People's Republic of China, 2020), movie adaptation of the novel series by the same name
2022	Ida to Doubutsutachi no Mahou Gakuen	Leonie	Japanese edition of the movie "The School of the Magical Animals" (Germany, 2021)
2022	Darlin'	Billy	Japanese edition of the movie "Darlin'" (USA, 2019)
2022	Majo no Mitsuyaku	Amy	Japanese edition of the movie "Cherry Tree" (Republic of Ireland, 2015)
2022	Royalteen: Uwasa no Princess	Lena	Japanese edition of the 2022 Netflix original movie "Royalteen"
2023	Fingernails	Alexandra	
2024	Confidential Assignment 2: International	Kang Yeon-ah	

==== Live-action series dubbing ====
Year	Title	Role	Notes
2022	Step ~Saikou no Ippou~	-	Japanese edition of the 2022 Apple TV+ original drama series "Best Foot Forward"
2022	The Flash	Tinya Wazzo	
2023	Titans	-	Season 4 appearance
2024	Avatar: The Last Airbender	Suki	
2025	Genie, Make a Wish	Bo-kyung	

==== Animated series dubbing ====
Year	Title	Role	Notes
2025	Mighty Monsterwheelies	-	Season 2 appearance

==== Cross-media productions ====
Year	Title	Role	Notes
2019	Idol Bu Show	Kokoro Kakegawa	Member of the in-story idol unit X-UC
2020	Denonbu	Shian Inubousaki	Member of the in-story electronic music club of Jingumae Sandou High School
2023	Rinkai! Project	Miko Yahiko	

=== Live-action ===
==== Radio ====
Year	Title	Network	Notes
2019	Nezucchi, Hasegawa Rena no Seiyuu-san Totonoimashita!	BSN	Airing every Thursday from 21:15 to 21:45, features tarento Nezucchi and a voice actress guest in every episode
2019	Coco-Roco Crocodile	Nishinippon Broadcasting	Aring every Friday from 11:00 to 11:15, features members from the Crocodile agency
2019	Hasegawa Rena's Ponchan-nel!	Nicovideo	Airing every Monday at 20:00. Spin-off of Nezucchi, Hasegawa Rena no Seiyuu-san Totonoimashita!
2020	Hasegawa Rena no radioclub.jp	Radio Kansai	Aring every Sunday from 19:00 to 19:30, with switching hosts. Appointed host for the quarter from October to December 2020.
2020	Hasegawa Rena no ai ni kinaseya	BSN; Tochigi Broadcasting	Airing every Sunday from 19:30 to 20:00 on the Niigata Broadcasting station, and every Saturday from 00:30 to 00:45 on the Tochigi Broadcasting station. Continuation of Nezucchi, Hasegawa Rena no Seiyuu-san Totonoimashita!
2021	Light, Present, Golf Ittō-Ryōdan	InterFM	Airing every Sunday from 05:30 to 06:00, features golf-centered talk and is co-hosted with golfer Tatsuaki Nakamura, and personality Yuusuke Kondo.

==== Television ====
Year	Title	Role	Network	Notes
2018	Produce 48	Herself	Mnet	Reality competition series; finished in 71st place
2019	Gyōretsu Tamago	Herself	Chiba TV	Variety show; regular panelist

==== Theater ====
Year	Title	Role	Notes
2020	Tatsu no Otoshigo	Mero	
2021	Lip-Sealed	Herself	On-stage reading play co-starring also Marina Yamada and Momoka Ōnishi
2022	Umibe no Machi de mou ichido, ano Hi no Kanojo ni Aeta nara	Rena	On-stage reading play co-starring also Yurie Kozakai, Ma Chia-ling and Momoka Ōnishi. Also going by the official English-styled title of "If I could see her again that day in the seaside town".
2022	Emily Diary	Emily Dyer	Theater play based on the role-playing game Identity V
2022	Kimi to Boku no Saigo no Senjou, Aruiwa Sekai ga Hajimaru Seisen	Iska	Theater adaptation of the eponymous manga and anime series.
2023	Towa Tsugai	Flamingo	Theater adaptation of the eponymous game by Square Enix.

==== Film ====
Year	Title	Role	Notes
2018	Midnight Bus	Sachiko Kimura	Supporting role
2019	Lunch Time Hajimechatta	Mei Yashiki	Direct-to-DVD short drama series
2025	Obaachan no Himitsu	Kurumi Yamano	

== Discography ==
=== Songs within Idol Bu Show ===
Title	Release date	Product code	Notes
Current Xanadu (カレント・ザナデゥ)	January 8, 2020	POCE-12138	CD release, performing as part of the in-scenario idol unit X-UC; Additionally to the titular track, also performed in the B-side tracks "Smile×Work!" and the collaborative cross-unit track "SENRAN! Idol Tenkado he" (SENRAN!アイドル天下道へ)
Papier Mache IDOL	October 7, 2020	POCE-92109	CD release, performing as part of the in-scenario idol unit X-UC; Additionally to the titular track, also performed in the B-side track "Brave Call! -& Just Now We Come!-"
YEAH SAY YEAHHH!/Mugen Nihon Rettou LOVE/Pastel Gray (YEAH SAY YEAHHH!/無限日本列島LOVE/パステルグレイ)	June 22, 2022	POCE-12183	CD release, containing the songs performed in the Idol Bu Show anime movie

=== Songs within Denonbu ===
Title	Release date	Notes
Hyper Bass (feat. Yunomi)	September 9, 2020	Unit song as the in-scenario Harajuku-based unit Jingumae Sandou High School electronic music club; digital distribution release
good night baby (feat. Moe Shop)	September 9, 2020	Solo song; digital distribution release
Future (feat. Midy) (Future (feat. ミディ))	November 25, 2020	Unit song originally included as a new song in the first physical mini-album "New Pallet" by the in-scenario Harajuku-based unit; later received a digital distribution re-release on June 12, 2021
Doki Doki Parirarura (Respect. CY8ER) (ドキドキパリラルラ (Respect. CY8ER))	January 2, 2021	Unit song as the in-scenario Harajuku-based unit; digital distribution release
Syrupse-α (feat. Ando Hiroki) (シロプスα (feat. 安藤啓希))	June 30, 2021	Unit song by the in-scenario Harajuku-based unit originally included as a new song in the physical album "Denonbu Best Album – Season .0 – "
Akuma no Lullaby (Prod. KiWi) (悪魔のララバイ (Prod. KiWi))	July 17, 2021	Unit song as the in-scenario Harajuku-based unit; digital distribution release
Eat Sleep Dance (feat. Moe Shop)	September 2, 2021	Solo song; digital distribution release
Distortion (feat. Yunomi)	November 1, 2021	Unit song as the in-scenario Harajuku-based unit; digital distribution release
Find Me (feat. Midy) (Find Me (feat.ミディ))	November 18, 2021	Unit song as the in-scenario Harajuku-based unit; digital distribution release
You Are The Light	June 29, 2022	First song featuring all of the Denonbu characters; digital distribution release and included as a new song in the physical album "Denonbu Best Album – Season .1 – The Lights"
Prayer (Prod. picco)	January 26, 2023	Solo song; digital distribution release
Tokyo Bug Night (feat. Moe Shop)	March 8, 2023	Solo song; digital distribution release
Full Moon	June 13, 2023	Unit song as the in-scenario Harajuku-based unit; digital distribution release
Change	June 21, 2023	Unit song as the in-scenario Harajuku-based unit; digital distribution release
Infinite Colour	February 29, 2024	Unit song as the in-scenario Harajuku-based unit; digital distribution release
Maboroshi no Hoshi (まぼろしのほし)	August 25, 2024	Unit song as the in-scenario Harajuku-based unit; digital distribution release
Gekka Ranbu (Prod. EmoCosine & Mitukiyo) (月下乱舞 (Prod. EmoCosine & ミツキヨ))	April 24, 2025	Solo song; digital distribution release

=== Songs within Tokyo 7th Sisters ===
Title	Release date	Notes
New Age	July 26, 2022	Debut song as part of the in-game unit Roots.
WONDEЯ GIRL	November 1, 2022	As the in-game unit Roots.
Hidden Stages	February 14, 2023	As the in-game unit Roots., included inside the release of the album "'Startrail'"
Find Me	February 14, 2023	As the in-game unit Roots., included inside the release of the album "'Startrail'"
Wildflower	August 30, 2023	As the in-game unit Roots.
Mellow Melodies	November 1, 2023	As the in-game unit Roots., included inside the release of the album "'Brightestar'"
XOXO PAiN	November 1, 2023	As the in-game unit Roots., included inside the release of the album "'Brightestar'"
Link Wink	July 9, 2024	As the in-game unit Roots.
Round-Round-Round	August 19, 2025	As the in-game unit Roots.

== Bibliography ==
=== Photobooks ===
Year	Title	Release date	Publisher	ISBN	Notes
2020	Isshunkan no Hikari	August 24, 2020	Akita Shōten	ISBN 978-4253110907	
