= Rika Nakai =

Japanese television personality (born 1997)

- 中井 りか
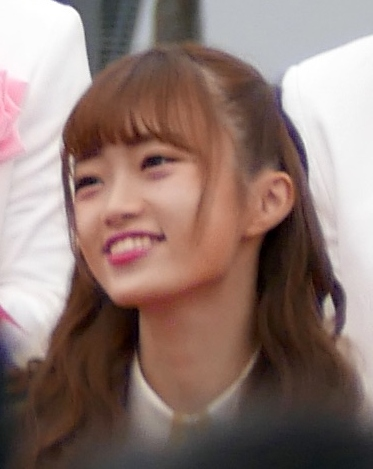
- Nakai in September 2018
- Born: August 23, 1997 (age 29); Toyama, Toyama Prefecture, Japan
- Occupation: Tarento
- Years active: 2015–present
- Agent: Ohta Production
- Spouse: Yuuki Miyake (m. 2024)
- Children: 1
- Musical career
- Genres: J-pop
- Instrument: Vocals
- Years active: 2015–2023
- Formerly of: NGT48

Rika Nakai (中井 りか, Nakai Rika; born August 23, 1997) is a Japanese actress and singer. She is a former member of AKB48's sister group NGT48. She is affiliated with Ohta Production.

== Early life and career ==
Growing up in Toyama, Nakai had aspirations to become famous since she was in elementary school. With influences from AKB48 while Nakai was young, she entered and passed the NGT48 audition for 1st generation members in 2015 during the twelfth grade of high school.

In 2016, Nakai was placed in Team NIII with 15 other members and performed at the NGT48 Theater grand opening. In 2017, she signed up to Ohta Production from her previous agency AKS, and had been appearing on various television programs afterwards, even performing in a dedicated one-day solo concert in 2018. Nakai left NGT48 on August 31, 2023.

== Personal life ==
On March 31, 2024, Nakai announced her marriage to a non-celebrity, later revealed to be TV Tokyo director Yuuki Miyake. On September 21, 2024, Nakai announced on the Fuji TV variety show All Night Fujiko, that she would give birth to the first child, who was born on January 29, 2025.

== Media ==
=== Television ===
==== Variety shows ====
- Hakuchumu (白昼夢) (Fuji TV, October 2017–March 2019)
- Smart Fondue (スマートフォンデュ, Sumāto Fondu) (TV Asahi, October 2017–December 2018) – Assistant MC
- Seishun Kōkō 3-nen C-gumi (青春高校3年C組) (TV Tokyo, April 2018–March 2020) – Assistant MC
- Tadaya (無料屋) (TV Asahi, February 2019–September 2020) – MC
- Kyō Kara Tomodachi ni Naremasuka? (今日から友達になれますか?) (Fuji TV, April 2019–March 2020) – MC alongside Kazutoyo Koyabu
