= NGT48 =

Japanese idol group

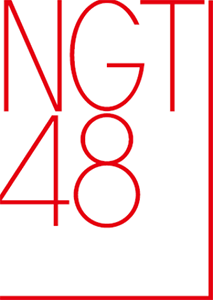
- NGT48's logo

Background information
- Origin: Niigata, Japan
- Genre: J-pop
- Years active: 2015–present
- Labels: Ariola Japan (2017–2020); EMI Records Japan (2020–present)
- Members: See members
- Website: ngt48.jp

NGT48 (pronounced "N.G.T. Forty-eight") is a Japanese girl group produced by Yasushi Akimoto. NGT48 is named after Niigata City of Niigata Prefecture, where the group is based. The group performs at the NGT48 Theater which is located in the fourth floor of the LoveLa2 shopping mall in Niigata City.

After then-member Maho Yamaguchi's assault in December 2018, after which she had claimed that the management had done nothing to address other NGT48 members allegedly involved in assisting her attackers, in April 2019, the NGT48 management dissolved the team system, with all current members unified according to generations.

== History ==
=== 2015–2018: Debut ===
The creation of the group was announced on January 25, 2015 on the final, fifth day of a traditional series of AKB48 concerts entitled AKB48 Request Hour Setlist Best 1035 2015. In October 2015, the Niigata-based company Kuriyama Beika Co., Ltd. appointed NGT48 a "bakauke PR ambassador", a PR ambassador for its product named bakauke. As of December 2015, NGT48 is collaborating with McDonald's on a 48-piece bucket of Chicken McNuggets sold in Japan. Each bucket features photos of NGT48 and comes with a collectible card with a photo of a random member of the group. NGT48's own theater opened in Niigata on January 10, 2016.

The group's members are part of the cast of an anime adaptation of Higurashi When They Cry, which was premiered from May 20 on BS Sky PerfecTV!. The group also recorded the theme song for the series titled "Kimi wa Doko ni Iru?" and is included on the Theater Edition of the 44th single by AKB48, "Tsubasa wa Iranai", which was released on June 1, 2016.

Their debut single, "Seishun Dokei", was released on April 12, 2017 under Ariola Japan. In 2018, Noe Yamada and Rena Hasegawa participated in the South Korean competition show Produce 48, representing NGT48. Hasegawa placed 71st and was eliminated during the first round; Yamada placed 41st and was eliminated during the second round.

=== 2018–2019: Group restructure ===
Following Maho Yamaguchi's alleged assault, during a press conference on March 29, 2019, the city of Niigata announced that they were cutting ties with NGT48 effective April, including ending their radio show, Port de NGT. On April 11, 2019, after apologizing to the Niigata government for mishandling Yamaguchi's assault allegations, the official NGT48 website announced that the management was dissolving the team structure and reintroducing the current members as a unified "first generation" after their final performances on April 21. On April 17, Yuki Kashiwagi announced she was withdrawing from NGT48, her last performance with them being at Team NIII's concert on April 21.

On April 21, Yamaguchi, Rena Hasegawa, and Riko Sugahara announced they were graduating from NGT48 on May 18, 2019, following the ending of Team NIII's and Team G's stages. Then, the two teams' structure of NGT48 was disbanded after their final performance of Team NIII's Hokori no Oka (誇りの丘) Stage and Team G's Saka Agari (逆上がり) Stage.

On May 21, 2019, Minami Kato was demoted to kenkyūsei after posting an Instagram story of Yamaguchi's graduation with the caption, "I'm doing my nails over here. I wish someone would change the channel." The NGT48 management also decided to halt social media posts from all members for the time being.

On July 18, 2019, Fuka Murakumo also announced her graduation from the group, which took place at the end of August. After seven months of inactivity, the group had its first concert on August 3, 2019, at the Tokyo Idol Festival, with plans to resume activity in fall. On August 13, the group started their first stage without any teams titled Yume wo Shinaseru Wake ni Ikanai (夢を死なせるわけにいかない), a revival stage from Himawarigumi 2nd Stage performed by AKB48.

On August 26, Anju Sato announced she was graduating on September 25. On February 18, 2020, Moeka Takakura announced that she would leave the group the same year on March 22.

== Members ==
As of May 2019, according to the official website.

=== First generation ===
Name	Birth date (age)	Election rank		
Name	Birth date (age)	8	9	10
Yuka Ogino (荻野由佳)	February 16, 1999 (age 27)	95	5	4
Anju Satō (佐藤杏樹)	November 5, 2001 (age 24)	N/A	N/A	N/A
Reina Seiji (清司麗菜)	April 19, 2001 (age 25)	N/A	N/A	N/A
Marina Nishigata (西潟茉莉奈)	October 16, 1995 (age 31)	N/A	41	24
Nanako Nishimura (西村菜那子)	August 11, 1997 (age 29)	N/A	N/A	43
Noe Yamada (山田野絵)	October 7, 1999 (age 27)	N/A	N/A	91
Tsugumi Oguma (小熊倫実)	December 15, 2002 (age 23)	N/A	N/A	69
Yuria Kado (角ゆりあ)	May 22, 2000 (age 26)	N/A	77	N/A
Aina Kusakabe (日下部愛菜)	February 6, 2002 (age 24)	N/A	N/A	N/A
Rika Nakai (中井りか)	August 23, 1997 (age 29)	96	23	37
Ayuka Nakamura (中村歩加)	July 28, 1998 (age 28)	N/A	N/A	64
Miharu Nara (奈良未遥)	March 20, 1998 (age 28)	N/A	N/A	21
Hinata Homma (本間日陽)	November 10, 1999 (age 26)	N/A	13	16
Fūka Murakumo (村雲颯香)	July 5, 1997 (age 29)	N/A	N/A	N/A

=== 3rd draft ===
Name	Birth date (age)	Election rank
Name	Birth date (age)	10
Chikana Andō (安藤千伽奈)	January 13, 2001 (age 25)	N/A
Kairi Satō (佐藤海里)	August 5, 2000 (age 26)	N/A
Nanami Takahashi (高橋七実)	July 7, 2001 (age 25)	N/A
Yunako Tsushima (對馬優菜子)	August 20, 2001 (age 25)	N/A
Miyu Fujisaki (藤崎未夢)	November 17, 2000 (age 25)	N/A

=== 2nd generation ===
Name	Birth date (age)		
Name	Birth date (age)	Nanami Ōtsuka (大塚七海)	November 7, 2000 (age 25)
Haruka Ogoe (小越春花)	June 26, 2004 (age 22)		
Sayaka Kawagoe (川越紗彩)	October 14, 2000 (age 26)		
Sara Komiyama (小見山沙空)	July 27, 2004 (age 22)		
Yume Sogabe (曽我部優芽)	March 16, 2002 (age 24)		
Hina Terada (寺田陽菜)	March 13, 2004 (age 22)		
Yū Tominaga (富永夢有)	July 16, 2002 (age 24)		
Ai Furusawa (古澤愛)	October 1, 2000 (age 26)		
Aoi Furutate (古舘葵)	August 10, 2004 (age 22)		
Kaho Mashimo (真下華穂)	November 8, 1999 (age 26)		
Hino Mimura (三村妃乃)	June 15, 2002 (age 24)		
Hinata Morohashi (諸橋姫向)	January 4, 2003 (age 23)		

=== 3rd generation ===
Name	Birth date (age)		
Name	Birth date (age)	Rua Isobe (磯部瑠紅)	May 7, 2007 (age 19)
Yūna Kimoto (木本優菜)	June 17, 2003 (age 23)		
Hanae Kita (喜多花恵)	September 9, 2003 (age 23)		
Yūha Kitamura (北村優羽)	September 22, 2004 (age 22)		
Moe Sugimoto (杉本萌)	July 17, 2005 (age 21)		
Natsuki Suizu (水津菜月)	April 27, 2004 (age 22)		
Ririka Suzuki (鈴木凛々花)	September 30, 2008 (age 18)		

=== Former members ===
Name _{(Birthdate)}	Election										Team	Notes
Name _{(Birthdate)}	1	2	3	4	5	6	7	8	9	10	Team	Notes
Ayaka Mizusawa (水澤彩佳) (November 5, 1994)									N/A		Kenkyūsei	Graduated on March 31, 2017.
Yuria Ōtaki (大滝友梨亜) (April 21, 1995)									N/A	N/A	Kenkyūsei	Graduated on October 31, 2017.
Rie Kitahara (北原里英) (June 24, 1991)	13	16	13	13	21	19	11	12	10		Team NIII	Graduated on April 18, 2018.
Aya Miyajima (宮島亜弥) (November 27, 1997)								N/A	70		Team NIII	Graduated on August 7, 2018.
Mau Takahashi (髙橋真生) (June 3, 2001)								N/A	N/A	N/A	Team NIII	Graduated on October 6, 2018.
Runa Hagiri (羽切瑠菜) (November 29, 1999)											Kenkyūsei	Resigned on March 10, 2019.
Yuki Kashiwagi (柏木由紀) (July 15, 1991)	9	8	3	3	4	3	2	5			Team NIII	Left on April 21, 2019.
Maho Yamaguchi (山口真帆) (September 17, 1995)								N/A	53	70	First generation	Graduated on May 18, 2019.
Riko Sugahara (菅原りこ) (November 23, 2000)								N/A	N/A	N/A	First generation	Graduated on May 18, 2019.
Rena Hasegawa (長谷川玲奈) (March 15, 2001)								N/A	N/A	77	First generation	Graduated on May 18, 2019.
Mirii Yamazaki (山崎美里衣) (November 21, 2000)											Kenkyūsei	Graduated on June 12, 2019.
Tomoka Takazawa (高沢朋花) (June 1, 2003)											Kenkyūsei	Graduated on June 30, 2019.
Ayusa Watanabe (渡邉歩咲) (March 9, 2001)											Kenkyūsei	Graduated on June 30, 2019.
Moeka Takakura (高倉萌香) (April 23, 2001)								N/A	25	67	First generation	Graduated on March 23, 2020.
Ayaka Tano (太野彩香) (July 20, 1997)								N/A	N/A	53	First generation	Graduated on October 31, 2020.
Minami Kato (加藤美南) (January 15, 1999)								76	71	30	First generation	Graduated on January 31, 2021.

== Discography ==
=== Studio albums ===
List of studio albums, with selected chart positions
Title	Album details	Peak positions		Sales
Title	Album details	JPN Oricon	JPN Billboard	Sales
Mikansei no Mirai (未完成の未来)	Released: June 29, 2022; Label: Universal Music Japan; Formats: CD	3	3	JPN: 31,943

=== Singles ===
List of singles, with selected chart positions, showing year released, sales, certifications and album name
No.	Title	Year	Peak chart positions		Sales			Certifications	Albums
No.	Title	Year	JPN	JPN Hot	Oricon		Billboard Japan	Certifications	Albums
No.	Title	Year	JPN	JPN Hot	First week	Total	Billboard Japan	Certifications	Albums
1	"Seishun Dokei" (青春時計)	2017	1	1	160,271	208,247	277,180	RIAJ: Platinum	Non-album singles
2	"Sekai wa Doko Made Aozora na no ka?" (世界はどこまで青空なのか？)	2017	2	2	148,442	201,800	266,946	RIAJ: Platinum	Non-album singles
3	"Haru wa Doko kara Kuru no ka?" (春はどこから来るのか？)	2018	1	1	109,012	165,917	189,405	RIAJ: Gold	Non-album singles
4	"Sekai no Hito e" (世界の人へ)	2018	2	2	143,303	175.607	207,269	RIAJ: Gold	Non-album singles
5	"Sherbet Pink" (シャーベットピンク, Shābetto Pinku)	2020	2	5	80,011	132,985	165,736	RIAJ: Gold	Non-album singles
6	"Awesome"	2021	3	37	76,530	135,088	197,836		Non-album singles
7	"Ponkotsu na Kimi ga Suki da" (ポンコツな君が好きだ)	2021	2	6	62,530	110,376	171,087		Non-album singles
8	"Wataridoritachi ni Sora wa Mienai" (渡り鳥たちに空は見えない)	2022	1	12	43,826	125,931	172,146		Non-album singles
9	"Ano sa, Iya Betsu ni..." (あのさ、いや別に。。。)	2023	2	5	52,241	106,302	138,884		Non-album singles
10	"Isshun no Hanabi" (一瞬の花火)	2024	5	9	55,430	104,915	132,467		Non-album singles
11	"Kibō Ressha" (希望列車)	2025	3	13	43,195	109,905	135,250		Non-album singles
12	"Kaze no Kataomoi" (風の片想い)	2026	1	5	68,528				Non-album singles

=== Other songs ===
Title	Year	Albums
"Max Toki 315-gō" (Maxとき315号)	2016	"Kimi wa Melody"
"Kimi wa Doko ni Iru?" (君はどこにいる?)	2016	"Tsubasa wa Iranai"
"Midori to Mori no Undokōen" (みどりと森の運動公園)	2017	"Shoot Sign"
"Tomodachi de Imashō" (友達でいましょう)	2018	"Jabaja"

== Filmography ==
=== Television shows ===
- HKT48 vs NGT48 Sashikita Gassen (NTV and Hulu Japan, January 12 – March 29, 2016)
- Higurashi When They Cry (SKY PerfecTV!, May 20 – June 24, 2016)
- Higurashi When They Cry Kai (Sky PerfecTV!, November 2016 – present)

== See also ==
- AKB48
- SKE48
- NMB48
- HKT48
- JKT48
- BNK48
- STU48
- MNL48
- SGO48
