= Seishun Dokei =

- Cover of the regular edition.

Single by NGT48
- A-side: "Seishun Dokei"
- Released: 12 April 2017
- Genre: J-pop
- Label: Ariola Japan

NGT48 singles chronology
"Seishun Dokei" (2017)	"Sekai wa Doko Made Aozora na no ka?" (2017)

Music video
- "Seishun Dokei" on YouTube

"Seishun Dokei" (青春時計) is the first single by Japanese idol girl group NGT48. It was released on April 12, 2017. It reached number-one on the weekly Oricon Singles Chart with 160,271 copies sold. It was also number-one on the Billboard Japan Hot 100.

== Track listing ==
Regular Edition
No.	Title	Length
1.	"Seishun Dokei" (青春時計)	3:28
2.	"Akigan Punk" (空き缶パンク)	4:29
3.	"Shita no Na de Yobeta no wa..." (下の名で呼べたのは・・・)	4:51
4.	"Seishun Dokei -off vocal version-"	3:28
5.	"Akigan Punk -off vocal version-"	4:29
6.	"Shita no Na de Yobeta no wa... -off vocal version-"	4:51

Type A
No.	Title	Length
1.	"Seishun Dokei" (青春時計)
2.	"空き缶パンク"
3.	"出陣"
4.	"Seishun Dokei -off vocal version-" (青春時計 -off vocal version-)
5.	"空き缶パンク -off vocal version-"
6.	"出陣 -off vocal version-"

Type B
No.	Title	Length
1.	"Seishun Dokei" (青春時計)
2.	"空き缶パンク"
3.	"純情よろしく"
4.	"Seishun Dokei -off vocal version-" (青春時計 -off vocal version-)
5.	"空き缶パンク -off vocal version-"
6.	"純情よろしく -off vocal version-"

Type C
No.	Title	Length
1.	"Seishun Dokei" (青春時計)
2.	"空き缶パンク"
3.	"暗闇求む"
4.	"Seishun Dokei -off vocal version-" (青春時計 -off vocal version-)
5.	"空き缶パンク -off vocal version-"
6.	"暗闇求む -off vocal version-"

== Chart performance ==
=== Oricon ===
Chart	Peak	Debut Sales	Sales Total
Weekly Singles Chart	1	160,271	207,626

=== Billboard Japan ===
Chart	Peak
Japan Hot 100	1
Radio Songs	25
Top Singles Sales	1
