= Assault of Maho Yamaguchi =

2018 assault in Japan

- Location: Niigata, Niigata Prefecture, Japan
- Date: December 8, 2018 (JST)
- Attack type: Assault
- Deaths: 0
- Injuries: 0
- Victim: Maho Yamaguchi
- Perpetrator: 2
- Litigation: Lawsuit filed against: Perpetrators

On December 8, 2018, Maho Yamaguchi, then a member of the idol girl group NGT48, was assaulted by two male fans of the group inside of her apartment building. Details of the incident were not disclosed until January 8, 2019, when Yamaguchi personally did on social media, also explaining that her personal information was leaked to the men through other members of NGT48, and denouncing the group's management for inaction on the issue. She was then allegedly pressured into apologizing in public, sparking outrage in Japan and abroad, with many celebrities including fellow NGT48 members accusing the group's management of victim blaming.

The NGT48 management assigned a female manager for the group, saying a woman would be better able to understand members' situations, and tasked a third-party committee to examine the incident, including the possible extent of other group members' involvement. The ensuing press conference led to a public clash when Yamaguchi rebutted management's claims in real time on Twitter, and led to local companies choosing not to renew yearly sponsorships. The decision by the agency to pardon those members who had been intimate with fans ultimately pushed Yamaguchi to withdraw from the group. Afterward, the management initiated a civil lawsuit against her alleged assailants, which ended in an out-of-court settlement.

== Incident ==
On January 8, 2019, Maho Yamaguchi, who was the co-captain of one of NGT48's sub-groups, alleged in her Showroom live stream and Twitter that on December 8, 2018, two men assaulted her as she was entering her apartment. She alleged that they grabbed her face and attempted to pin her on the ground, and were stopped by another resident. The men, both 25-year old university students, were arrested by the police, and released from custody 20 days later without prosecution. They denied Yamaguchi's description of events, claiming that they "just wanted to talk". A third male accomplice was later identified by management. Early reports on the incident mentioned the building was used by the NGT48 management as a surrogate for a dormitory for members who do not live in Niigata Prefecture and that the building was furnished with an automatic lock at the entrance.

Yamaguchi had brought the incident to the attention of the management of NGT48, but after a month of silence, she decided to bring the issue to the public. After her live stream was cut abruptly, Yamaguchi posted several since-deleted tweets detailing her account and claiming that other NGT48 members were responsible for leaking her personal information to her assailants, including her own address and what time she would be returning home.

During the group's third anniversary theater show on January 10, Yamaguchi publicly apologized for "causing trouble" by speaking out. A petition on Change.org calling for the resignation of NGT48 director Etsuro Imamura gained over 53,000 signatures before closing on January 13.

On January 14, AKS issued an apology and later confirmed that a member had shared information after being accosted by the men, but they also stated that "nothing illegal" had happened. On the same day, Imamura was transferred to AKS' Tokyo headquarters and was replaced by Maiko Hayakawa; AKS explained they chose Hayakawa because as a woman she would understand the members better. Alarms and counseling services were provided to NGT48 members.

== Investigation ==
On January 31, NGT48 management announced the formation of an independent third-party committee (consisting of a lawyers from Iwasaki Law, Akasaka Mori no Ki Law, and Shinwa Law) to investigate the causes of the incident and whether other NGT48 members had been involved. On March 21, 2019, their report was released on NGT48's website, which concluded that, while up to 12 members were alleged to have fraternized with fans, NGT48 members were not implicated as no criminal conspiracy was found. The incident was caused by the "excessive behavior from some fans", and aggravated by the poor civil infrastructure of Niigata which made group members relatively easy to locate.

The report also commented on the closeness between fans and group members. It noted that group members had been accosted by an accomplice of the two main assailants, and revealed details about the activities of many other members; that members had met individually with that man before; and that the assailants had been renting apartments in three other building complexes across Niigata in order to meet with other members who lived in those buildings. The report also contained quotes from an audio recording from the day of the incident; when Yamaguchi and an AKS staff member questioned the suspect, one assailant said they knew of the address of Yamaguchi's apartment from other group members.

On March 22, 2019, board members and managers from AKS, the talent agency that managed NGT48, held a press conference outlining the report's conclusions. Yamaguchi criticized the outcome live on Twitter, and categorically denied the claims made by Matsumura, AKS's board member. To his initial decision to give a pardon to all members who had had personal associations with fans, Yamaguchi said that he had told her the investigation was to identify the members fraternizing with fans and that those members would be fired, and said Matsumura had downplayed those interactions by saying it was "greetings", when in reality included intimate affairs with the assailants. Yamaguchi claimed that Matsumura had pressured her to apologize in January 2019 and she had eventually done so to ensure that the other members would not have to apologize in her stead.

After the NGT48's management dissolved the team structure, at the end of Team G's final theater show on April 21, 2019, Yamaguchi, Rena Hasegawa, and Riko Sugahara announced their withdrawal from NGT48. There, Yamaguchi spoke of how the AKS president accused her of being an "assailant against the company", and, referencing the management's decision, she stated that she could no longer stay "in a group where you will receive a pardon for anything". AKS did not comment on her claim but maintained that the decision to leave was her own. Rino Sashihara attempted to discuss Yamaguchi's situation with AKS founder Yasushi Akimoto, but she claimed that he is no longer part of the administration and is only involved as the creative producer. A farewell theater show was held on May 18: initially announced to feature solely Yamaguchi, Sugahara, and Hasegawa, seven other members made a voluntary guest appearance as a gesture of solidarity, with producer Akimoto also writing a song for the occasion.

== Lawsuit ==
On April 30, 2019, AKS filed a lawsuit against Yamaguchi's assailants asking for 30 million yen, claiming the assault had disrupted NGT48 events and caused 100 million yen in economic damages in addition to damaging the trust between members and agency; it also included a transcript of a recorded conversation between Yamaguchi, staff members, and the two men, in which they alleged that they were associating with 8 members in NGT48. At a press scrum on July 10, AKS' attorney Kazuhiro Endo claimed the point of the lawsuit was not money, but to uncover truth and use the results to prevent a reoccurrence.

Oral proceedings began on July 10, 2019, and on September 20 the two men denied having committed physical aggression, while alleging Yamaguchi willingly disclosed her personal information and address to the first defendant at a handshake event in 2017, so he could send gifts discreetly to her home. On October 28 the Niigata District Court held a hearing where the AKS attorney said that the defendants submitted evidence of their connection to Yamaguchi while denying that other NGT48 members were involved in their confrontation.

On October 30, 2019, Sports Nippon published photos they said depicted Yamaguchi and one of the assailants communicating their apartment numbers to each other with hand signals at a group's photo-op event. On Twitter, Yamaguchi rejected the news as "slander" and said the photos were the evidences presented in court days before and then leaked to the media; she said these were simply poses requested by fans, a common occurrence at such events. She also mentioned there were unreleased voice recordings containing current NGT48 members admitting to having private relationships with a group of people which included the assailants. AKS denied that their side was responsible for leaking the material to the press, as did the defendants. No other exhibits had since been presented by the defendants, as reported by the AKS attorney to the press later in January 2020.

In order to verify the claims made by the defendants at the trial, in the months of November 2019 and January 2020 AKS sent requests to the police to obtain the statement reports, cellphone inspection data, and other investigation papers related to the assailants. Likewise, requests were also sent to the prosecutor to obtain the incident's non-prosecution records, to which Yamaguchi also attached her consent. All requests were however rejected.

After the courthouse proposed an out-of-court settlement to the plaintiff and the defendants on March 3, 2020, the trial eventually ended in a settlement on April 9, 2020, without reaching a verdict from the judge and falling short of its stated goal. The two men agreed to pay ¥2.4 million in compensation within five years, and were banned from future events related to the AKB48 Groups, though AKS had said in January 2019 that they were already banned from attending NGT48's concerts and events. Endo claimed that the NGT48 members were not guilty of being accomplices to the suspects and their reactions towards Yamaguchi had been a result of miscommunication.

== Reactions ==
=== Public response ===
Yamaguchi's initial public apology sparked criticism over victim blaming and the management's negligence from domestic and international communities, including other 48 Group members such as Rino Sashihara, Akari Suda, and Yuki Kashiwagi and celebrities. Several companies withdrew sponsorships afterwards. During a press conference on March 29, 2019, the city of Niigata announced that they were cutting ties with NGT48 effective April, including ending their radio show, "Port de NGT." After Yamaguchi announced she was leaving the group, more sponsors began to pull out from NGT48, including the fashion brand Heather.

=== NGT48's response ===
On February 3, 2019, Team G members Rena Hasegawa, Riko Sugahara, and Fuka Murakumo removed "NGT48" from their social media profiles in solidarity with Yamaguchi.

On March 7, 2019, AKS announced Etsuro Imamura's dismissal from the management and Takahiro Hosoi's resignation as AKB48 theater manager for inappropriate behavior in midst of the committee's examination, after in a tweet former AKB48 manager Tomonobu Togasaki showed themselves enjoying a drink at a bar, while posting "Everyone, don't be fooled by these worthless reports".

On April 11, 2019, after apologizing to the Niigata government for mishandling Yamaguchi's assault allegations, the official NGT48 website announced that the management was dissolving the team structure and reintroducing the current members as a unified "first generation" after their final performances on April 21.

== See also ==
- 2014 AKB48 handsaw assault
- Stabbing of Mayu Tomita
- Handshake Event
