= Stabbing of Mayu Tomita =

2016 stabbing in Tokyo, Japan

- Native name: 小金井ストーカー刺傷事件
- Location: 35.6992428°N 139.5039582°E; Honchō 6-chōme−5−3 Koganei, Tokyo, Japan, 184-0004
- Date: 21 May 2016; 10 years ago c. 5:05 PM (JST)
- Attack type: Stabbing, attempted femicide
- Weapon: Pocket knife
- Victim: Mayu Tomita (survived)
- Perpetrator: Tomohiro Iwazaki
- Motive: Revenge for romantic rejection and returning and refusing Iwazaki's gifts
- Verdict: Pleaded guilty
- Convictions: Stalking; Attempted murder; Making criminal threats
- Sentence: 14 1/2 years in prison
- Litigation: Lawsuit filed by Tomita against: Tokyo Metropolitan Government; Former agent; The perpetrator

On May 21, 2016, Mayu Tomita, a 20-year-old Japanese singer and actress, was stabbed in the neck and chest area multiple times by 27-year-old fan Tomohiro Iwazaki, after she returned gifts that he had sent her. Prior to the attack, he had sent her multiple death threats over social media. As a result of the stabbing, anti-stalking laws in Japan were revised to include online threats on social media to better protect victims.

== Attack ==
Iwazaki, a fan of Tomita, had sent multiple "obsessive comments" to her blog and Twitter account. He reportedly sent her some books and a watch. The watch was sent between January and February 2016, and it was returned to the sender in April, after which he sent her around 400 hostile tweets. Tomita then blocked him on Twitter at the end of April. 12 days before the attack, Tomita had contacted the police at the station near her home in Musashino, Tokyo out of fear for her safety, but the police dismissed the case, believing his social media messages were not an immediate threat. In addition, anti-stalking laws in Japan did not include harassment on social media at the time.

On May 21, 2016, around 5:05 PM JST, Iwazaki confronted Tomita in front of a small concert venue near a train station before an event titled Solid Girls Night Vol. 11 in Koganei, Tokyo, where she would have been performing later that evening with other singers. Iwazaki had asked her why she returned the gifts he sent her, but stated that he "lost control" when Tomita did not give him a clear explanation. When Tomita turned around, he stabbed her from behind in chest and neck area 61 times with a pocket knife containing a 8.2 cm blade. Prosecutors alleged that he had yelled, "You should die, die, die!" as he stabbed her. Eyewitnesses called the police after hearing Tomita scream for help, and Iwazaki was arrested. Iwazaki told the police that he "intended to kill" Tomita and had prepared a knife beforehand. When Tomita had called the police before being stabbed, the emergency dispatcher had sent the police to her home instead of tracing the location of her cell phone.

Tomita was in critical condition but sustained no damage on her vital organs, and she regained consciousness on June 7, 2016. Tomita suffered from 34 stab wounds on her face, neck, back, and arms. She was also partially blinded in her left eye and had problems eating and singing. In addition, Tomita could not use her fingers and it is unknown when she can continue her music career. Tomita also suffered from post-traumatic stress disorder. She was released from the hospital in September 2016.

On December 17, 2016, Tomita criticized the Tokyo Metropolitan Police Department for dismissing her initial concerns. The police issued a formal apology to Tomita for not taking action.

== Victim ==
Mayu Tomita (冨田真由, Tomita Mayu; born October 12, 1995) is a Japanese singer and actress. In 2011, she starred in Fuji TV's web drama Secret Girls, featuring a group of middle school girls who lead a double life as members of an in-show Japanese idol girl group of the same name. Tomita was cast as Ai "Eye" Takano and performed as the character along with the rest of Secret Girls at music events. Their self-titled single, "Secret Girls", was released on March 21, 2012 and charted at #22 on Oricon's Weekly Singles Chart. She also made minor appearances in other films and television shows, such as Kamen Rider Fourze. At the time of the attack, Tomita was also a third-year college student at Asia University majoring in business.

== Perpetrator ==
Tomohiro Iwazaki (岩崎友宏, Iwazaki Tomohiro; born 1988 or 1989) was 27 years old at the time of stabbing. Iwazaki's older brother described him as "unskilled in expressing his emotions" but had a "gentle, child-like nature." He also mentioned that Iwazaki did not have many known friends.

At one point in time, Iwazaki was infatuated with model Ai Hashimoto, but he lost interest in her after she publicly stated she had once regularly watched romantic pornography. This led him to declare on his blog that women who appear in pornography should "commit suicide." Iwazaki had also appeared in one of Yui Hatano's pornographic films, titled Real Amateurs on a Virgin Graduation Bus Tour. Iwazaki had been a fan of Tomita after watching her shows and had expressed a desire to marry her.

== Trial ==
=== 2017 trial ===
Trials began on February 20, 2017. On the first day of trial, prosecutors read a note from Tomita to the court reading, "I want the criminal to die. If you cannot do that, I want him to be locked up for the rest of his life." Iwazaki admitted attacking Tomita, but his defense team claimed that he only did so out of frustration of her ignoring him, and that he had no intent to kill. Furthermore, they claimed that Iwazaki had tried to contact the police after the attack. Tomita's mother testified on February 21.

On February 23, Tomita made her first public appearance since the stabbing and spoke from behind a partition that shielded her from the people in the courtroom. In response to her testimony, Iwazaki shouted, "Then you should kill me", and, "I wasn't actually going to kill you", which caused him to be removed from the room.

Public prosecutors sought a prison term of 17 years. On February 28, the court instead sentenced Iwazaki to 14 years and 6 months in prison.

=== 2019 lawsuit ===
On July 11, 2019, Tomita launched a lawsuit against the Tokyo Metropolitan Government, her former agent, and Iwazaki, seeking ¥76 million in damages for failing to provide adequate protection prior to the stabbing. The case was settled in July 2025.

== Impact ==
Tomita's stabbing has led the National Diet to revise their anti-stalking laws in December 2016 to include online harassment on social media, which led to the arrest of 32-year-old Akihiro Fukushima for sending death threats to voice actress and singer Nana Mizuki over Twitter. Along with the 2014 incident where AKB48 members were attacked by a man with a saw during their handshake meeting, Tomita's stabbing has been frequently used as an example of stalker-related assaults on Japanese idols.

In 2017, animation director Yutaka Yamamoto condemned Iwazaki on his blog, but he also believed Tomita was at fault for rejecting his gifts and should have been prepared to defend herself. After receiving backlash for his comments, Yamamoto responded to the criticism by mentioning there was a double standard in the public, where they would care more about a "cute idol" than a "dirty middle-aged man."

== See also ==
- 2014 AKB48 handsaw assault – Assault on Japanese idols
- Assault of Maho Yamaguchi – 2018 assault in Japan
