= Japanese idol =

Type of entertainer

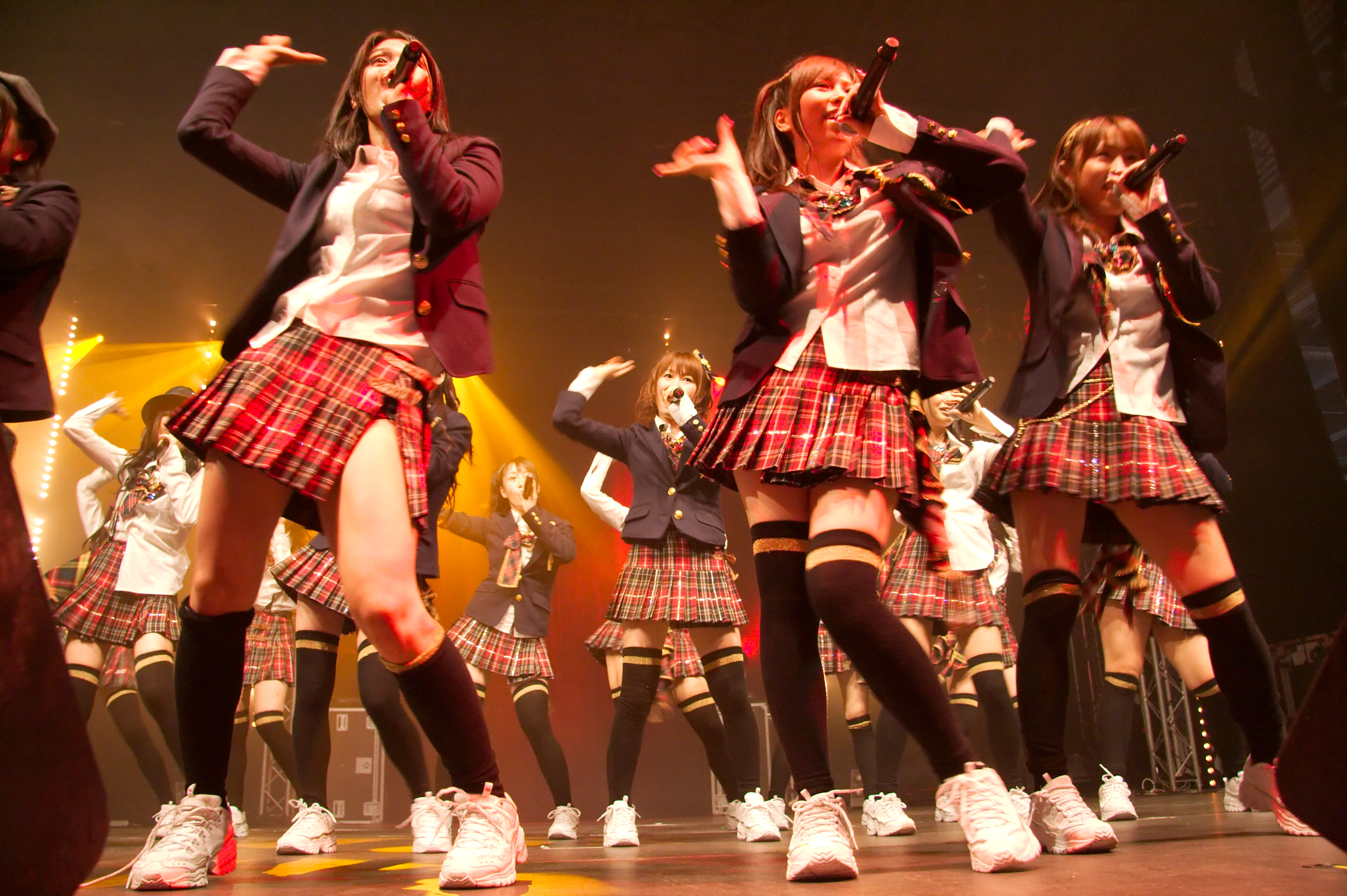
AKB48 (pictured 2009) is Japan's best-selling idol group and holds the Guinness World Record for "largest pop group", with more than 90 members divided among several teams.

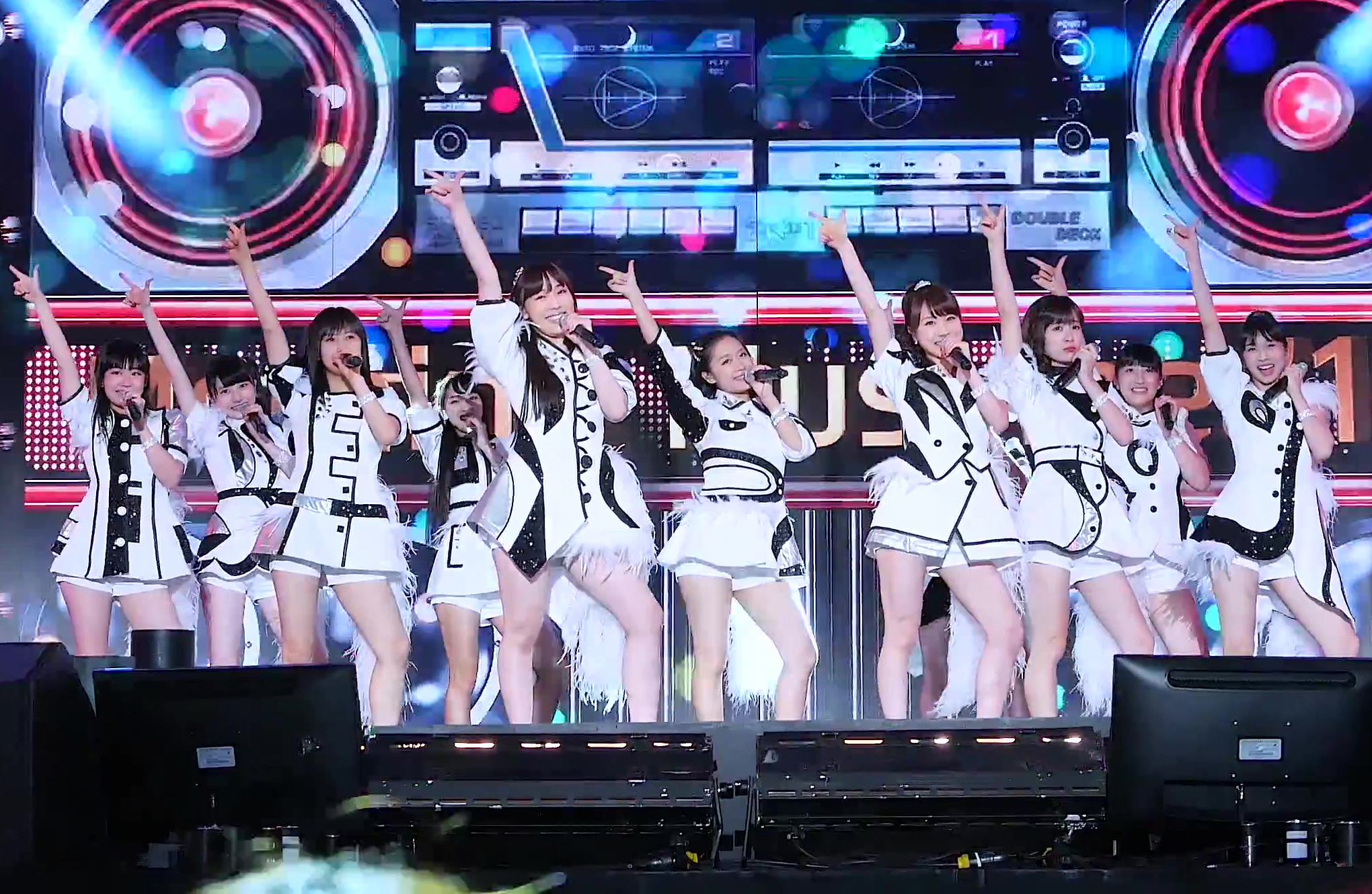
Morning Musume (pictured 2016), the longest-running female idol group, renewed interest in idols in the 1990s. They hold the record for the most consecutive top 10 singles for any Japanese artist.

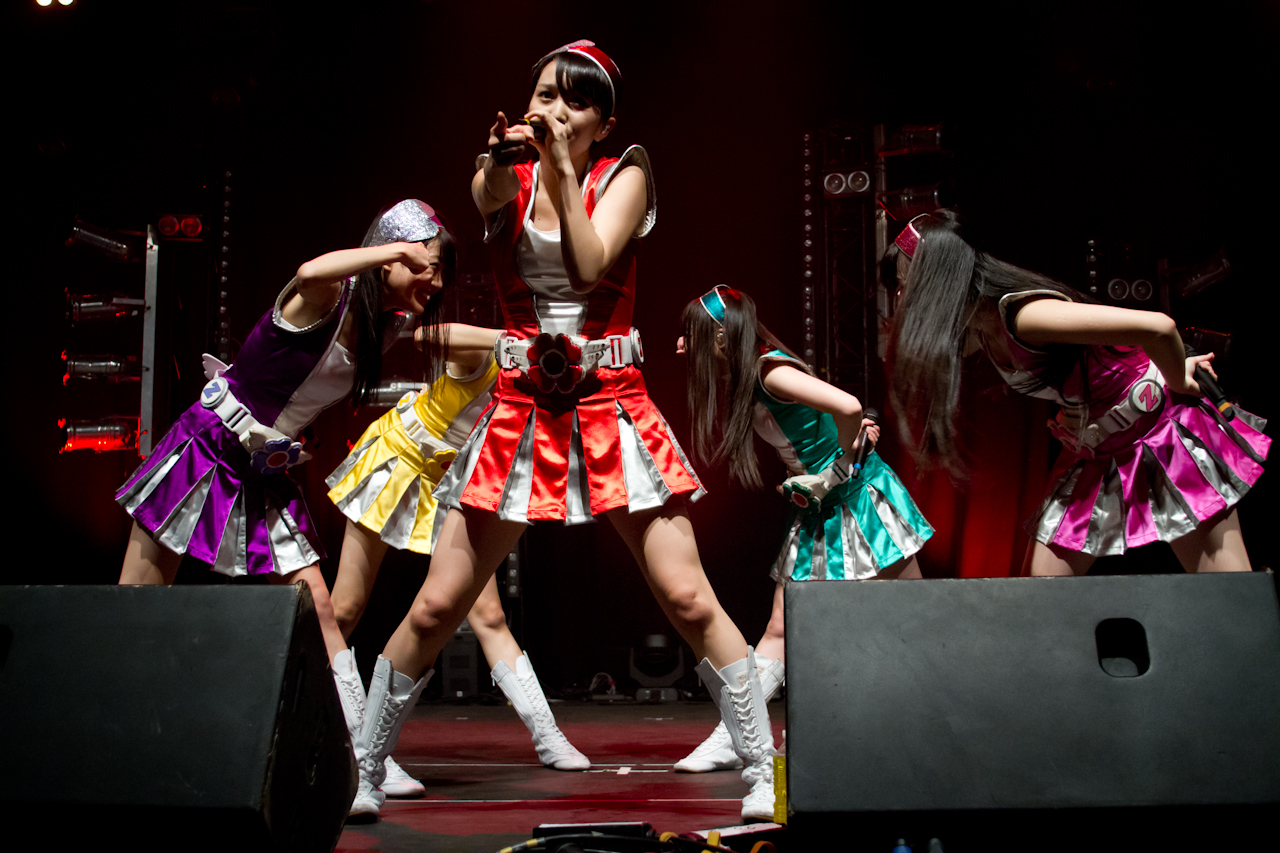
Momoiro Clover Z (pictured 2012) ranked number one among female idol groups, according to The Nikkei 2013–2018 surveys.

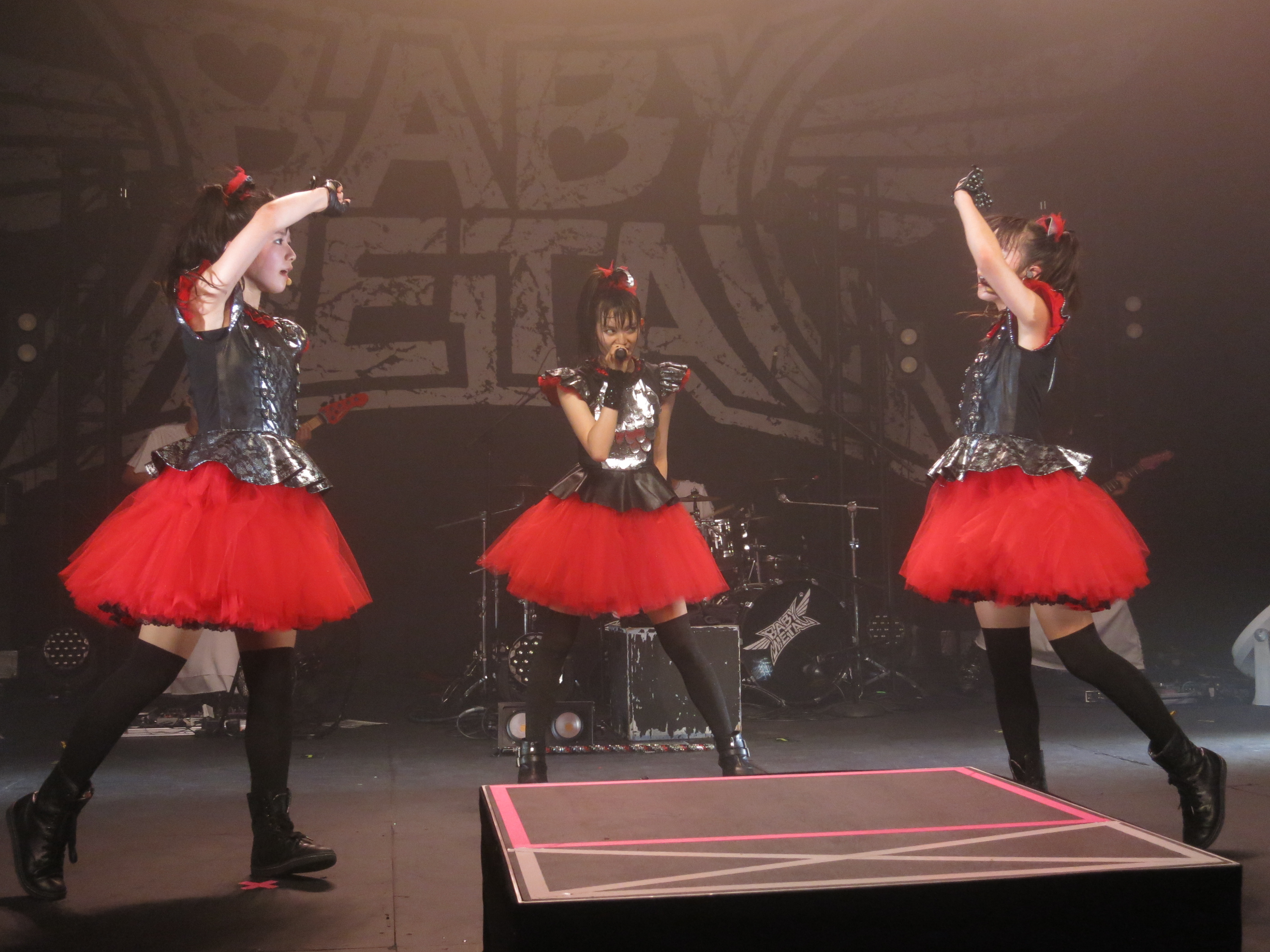
Babymetal (pictured 2014), whose third studio album, Metal Galaxy, is the highest charting Japanese-language album on the US Billboard 200 chart.

An idol (Japanese: アイドル, Hepburn: aidoru) is a type of entertainer marketed for image, attractiveness, and personality in Japanese popular culture. Idols are primarily singers with training in other performance skills such as acting, dancing, and modeling. Idols are commercialized through merchandise and endorsements by talent agencies. They dedicate significant time and resources to building relationships with fans through concerts and meetups.

Japan's idol industry first emerged in the 1960s and became prominent in the 1970s through television. During the 1980s, regarded as the "Golden Age of Idols", idols drew in commercial interest and began appearing in commercials and television dramas. As more niche markets began to appear in the late 2000s and early 2010s, it led to a significant growth in the industry known as the "Idol Warring Period." In 2017, over 10,000 teenage girls in Japan were idols, with over 3,000 groups active. Japan's idol industry has been used as a model for other popular idol industries, such as K-pop.

Sub-categories of idols include gravure idols, junior idols, net idols, idol voice actors, virtual idols, AV idols, alternative idols, underground idols, Akiba-kei idols, local idols, bandols, and Japanese-South Korean idols.

== Definition ==
=== Roles and training ===
An idol is an entertainer whose appeal centers not only on performance skills but also significantly on emotional accessibility and perceived personal growth. Idol careers in Japan typically begin at a young age, with many idols entering the industry through public auditions, local performance circuits, or training programs provided by talent agencies. Notably, fans often participate actively in the idols' development process, closely following their progress from novices to skilled performers. This style of recruiting and training was pioneered by Johnny Kitagawa, the founder of Johnny & Associates, and has since been used in other pop idol industries such as Korean idols in K-pop. The idol industry's structure actively encourages fans to support new idols as earlier favorites mature, perpetuating a cycle of emotional engagement, personal development, and collective identity formation within idol fandom communities.

Rather than solely focusing on technical proficiency, idol culture emphasizes values such as sincerity, visible effort, and emotional connection between performers and fans. Emotional reciprocity and mutual validation form the core of fan-idol relationships, significantly influencing fan behaviors like attending events, purchasing merchandise, and active online interactions. Some agencies intentionally recruit individuals with limited experience and market them as relatable or "unfinished" figures, encouraging fans to support them as they grow. Idols are often not expected to meet the same performance standards as other professionals in their respective fields of entertainment, but they are appreciated by fans for qualities such as sincerity, effort, and emotional expression rather than for perfection.

Anime News Network described the idol industry as highly demanding, with busy schedules that can limit time for personal life or family connections. Certain talent agencies have been criticized for withholding job assignments or notifying talents of work on short notice to discourage time off.

Music from idol singers is generally categorized under J-pop, though talent agencies may label them under the sub-genre "idol pop" for further distinction. Many idol singers find success as groups rather than individually. Within each idol group, the members are sometimes given distinct roles. One example of a role is the center, who occupies the center position in the group's choreography and thus receives the most focus. Another example is the leader, usually relegated to the oldest or most experienced member in the group, who acts as an intermediary for the members and the staff.

=== Public image ===
Idols are often promoted based on their personality, charm, and relatability, with a strong emphasis in Japanese culture on emotional sincerity, perseverance, and visible growth. Some talent agencies set behavioral guidelines for their performers, such as discouraging smoking or public romantic relationships, as part of sustaining an image that symbolizes hope, personal growth, and the trust-based connection idols often share with their fans. Some idol groups have colors assigned to their members to distinguish them to the public, a practice that was drawn from the Super Sentai series.

=== Outfits ===
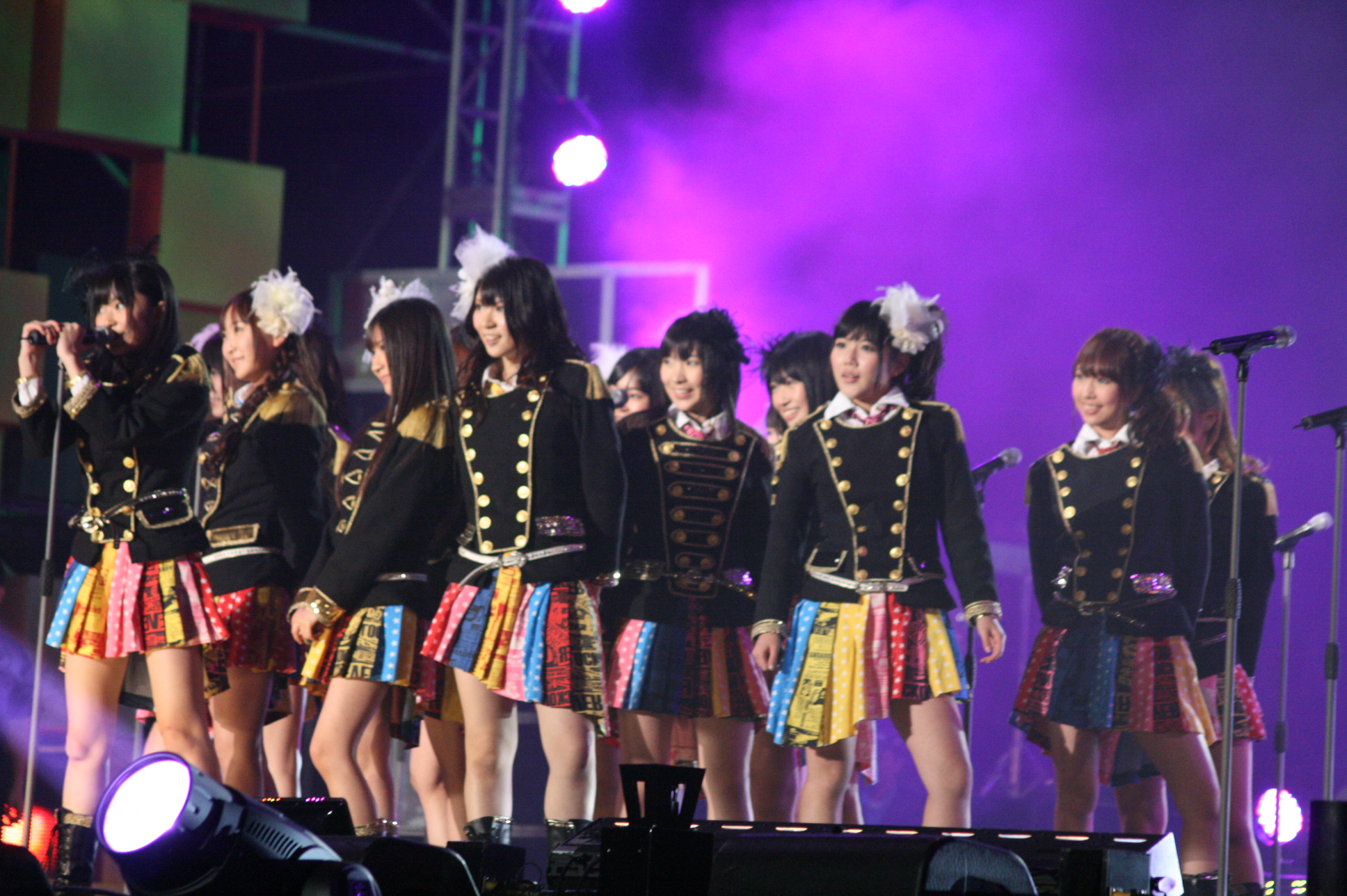
AKB48 (pictured 2010) popularized extravagant costumes based on school uniforms. The marching band costumes were worn in promotional media and activities for their 2010 single "Heavy Rotation".

Idols generally perform in elaborate costumes for specific performances. Costumes are created for each song in their promotion cycle, as well as graduation events, and some groups have their own in-house costume designer. AKB48, in particular, has had over 1,102 costumes created for the group since 2017. The outfits worn by female idols are generally described as "cute", while outfits worn by male idols are described as "cool."

Among many idol groups, school uniforms have been used as a standard costume. The integration of school uniforms in the idol industry originated from Onyanko Club, who debuted in 1985 with a concept based on school. Following their disbandment in 1987, other groups began adopting school uniforms as costumes, such as CoCo and Ribbon, two groups put together by Fuji TV's audition programs, followed by Seifuku Kōjō Iinkai in 1992 and Morning Musume in the early 2000s. When AKB48 debuted in 2006, the group used a school concept and the members have performed in various stylized costumes based on school uniforms. Since then, other groups have used stylized school uniforms as costumes, such as AKB48's sister groups, Sakura Gakuin, and Sakurazaka46, with some modifications to suit the groups' image and choreography.

In 2017, Nihon Tarento Meikan noted that stylized school uniforms being used as costumes gained popularity through AKB48 due to their unique designs, the short skirts, and the neatness of the uniform. The uniforms found popularity with men, as they represent their "eternal longing" and nostalgia for high school, while only gaining popularity with women in the 2010s through anime.

=== Graduation ===
Idols who retire to pursue other career paths are typically given a farewell event known as "graduations" (卒業式, sotsugyō-shiki). Female idols typically change careers at age 25 and male idols at ages 30–45. Prior to the 1980s, the terms "retirement" and "disbandment" were used.

The term "graduation" originated from the idol group Onyanko Club, as the group's concept drew similarities to an after-school club, and the fact that Onyanko Club member Miharu Nakajima's final solo single before retirement was released around school graduations in Japan. "Graduation" saw usage again when Tsunku, who produced the group Morning Musume, used the term as a euphemism regarding Yuko Nakazawa's departure from the group in April 2001. Nakazawa's departure had gained widespread media attention at the time, with articles using the term "graduation" equally to those using "retirement." In addition, Nakazawa's departure was celebrated at the final show of Morning Musume's spring concert tour, her final performance as a member of the group. Since then, graduations became closely associated with farewell concerts, which are announced and planned in advance.

Graduations are seen as an "amicable" ending of idol activities, as they have a positive nuance of celebrating an idol's career. An idol having a graduation ceremony is seen more favorably than terminating a contract or voluntarily withdrawing, as the latter two terms are seen as "abrupt" and "covering up a secret." Contract terminations and voluntary withdrawals are negatively connoted with scandals or health concerns. Former Denpagumi.inc member Moga Mogami described the difference between graduations and withdrawals in that idols who graduate tend to leave because they have clear future goals, while idols who withdraw did not leave entirely by their own choice.

== Sub-category markets ==
The diversity of Japan's idol industry has created several sub-category markets, each with a specific concept appealing to certain audiences.

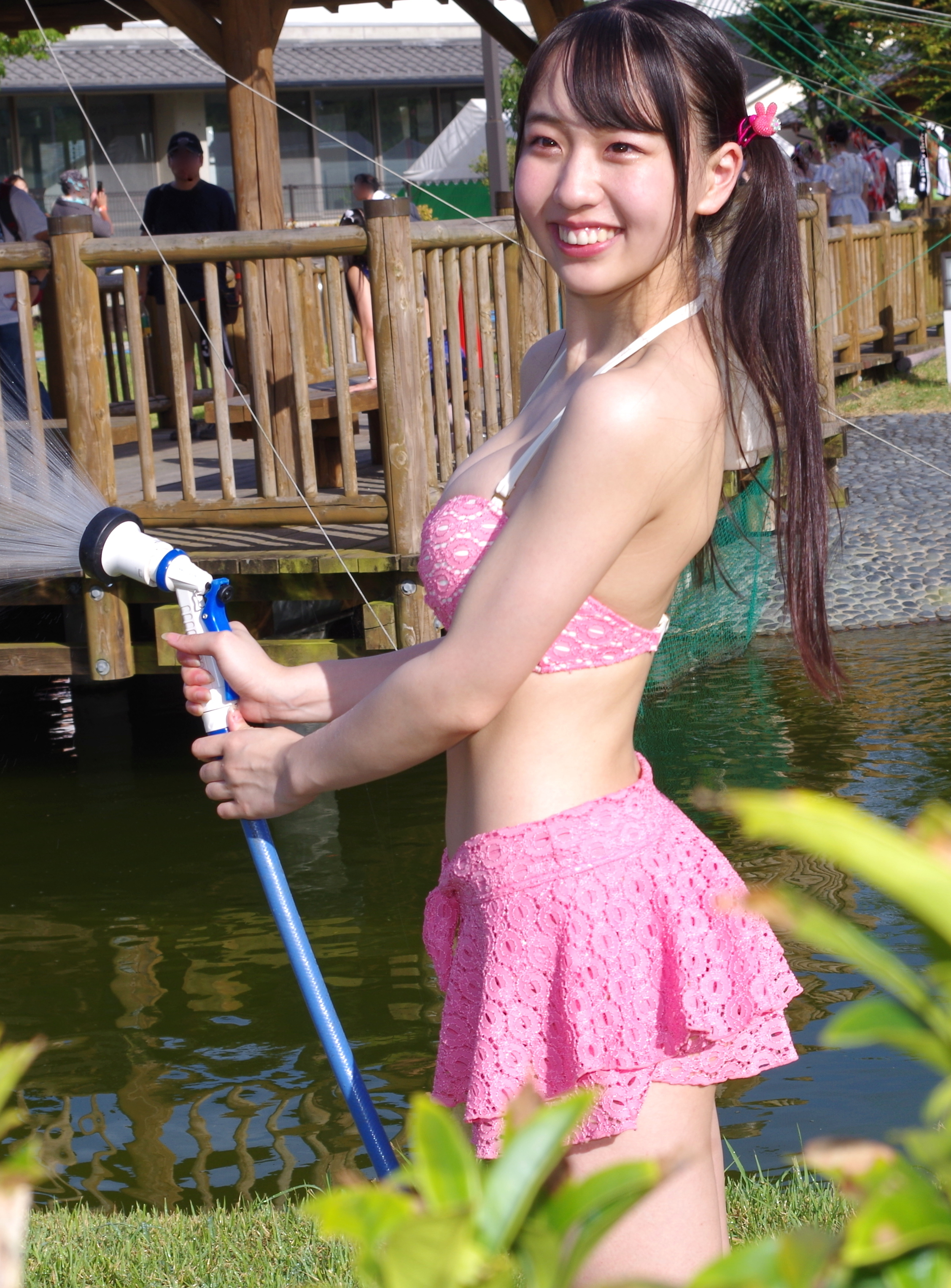
Mia Yanagawa (pictured 2019) is a gravure idol, appearing in pin-up style pictorials.

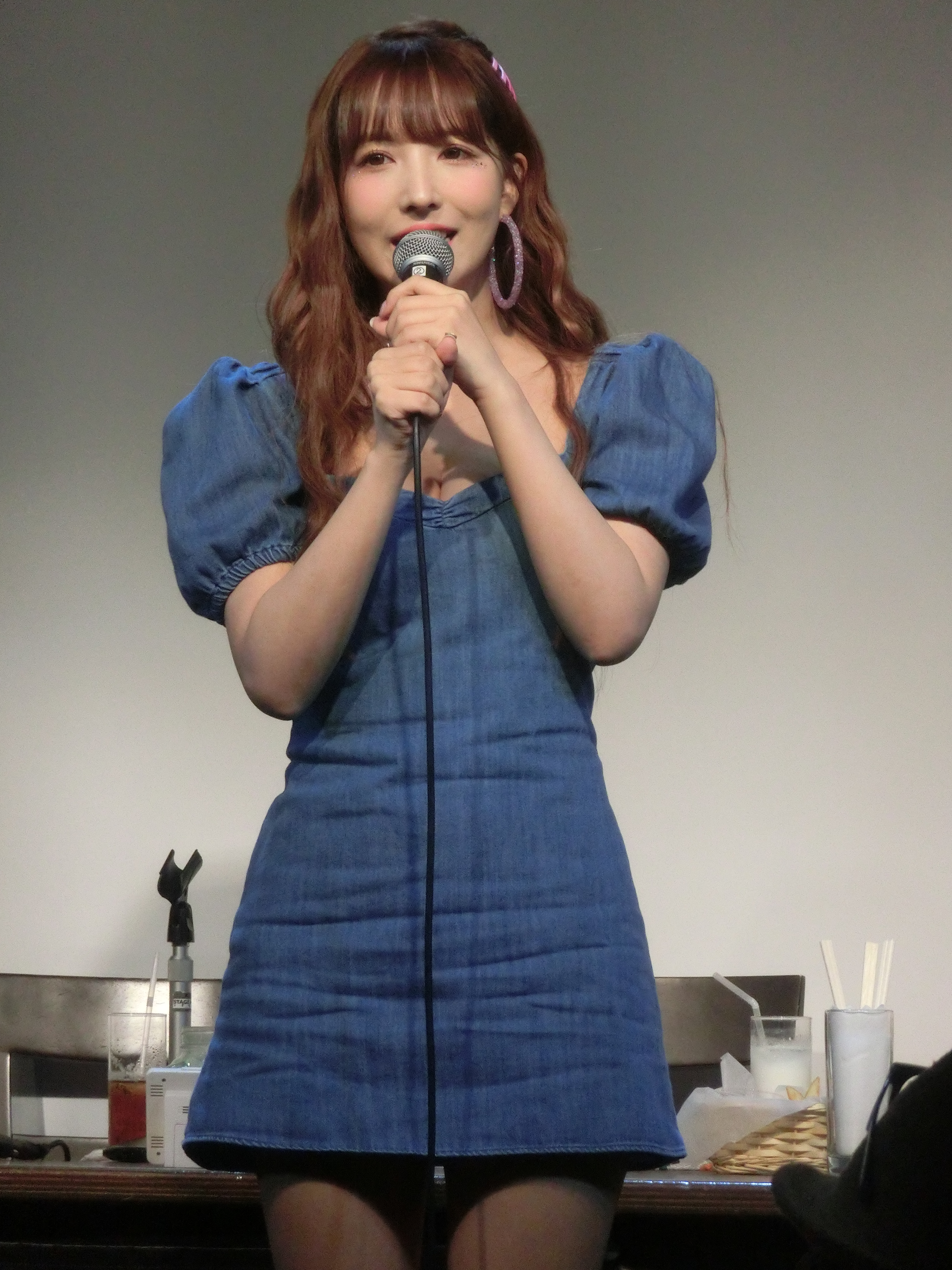
Yua Mikami (pictured 2019), an AV idol, both appears in adult videos and performs as an idol.

- AV idols (AV アイドル, AV aidoru): AV (adult video) idols generally refer to pornographic actresses and models, with the industry first emerging in the 1980s.
- Bandols (バンドル, Bandoru): Bandols are idol groups that play instruments and perform as bands. The term first emerged in the 2000s as a shortening of the phrase, "a new genre of neither bands nor idols" (バンドでもないアイドルでもない新ジャンル, Bando demo nai aidoru demo nai arata janru), which was used to describe the marketing concept of the band Zone.
- Gravure idols (グラビアアイドル, gurabia aidoru): Gravure idols are models who pose in provocative swimsuit and lingerie photographs in magazines and photo books marketed towards men, similar to pin-up models. In the 1970s, Agnes Lum, who rose to fame in Japan, is considered the first gravure idol despite the term not existing at the time. Other notable swimsuit models were Shinobu Horie, Reiko Katō, and Fumie Hosokawa. After Akiko Hinagata became a rising star in 1995, the term "gravure idol" was coined to describe her. In the 2000s, there was a significant growth in the gravure idol industry, with many women of different body types modeling. This led to sub-category markets in the gravure idol industry to describe their aesthetic and body types, which included "healing" (癒し系, iyashi-kei), "loli" (ロリ), "intelligent" (知性派, chisei-ha), "big breasts" (爆乳, bakunyū), and "sexy swimsuit" (水着エロ, mizugi-ero). The gravure idol industry faced a decline in 2010 due to the popularity of AKB48, as some of their members also did gravure modeling; as a result, the demand for newer talents was reduced.

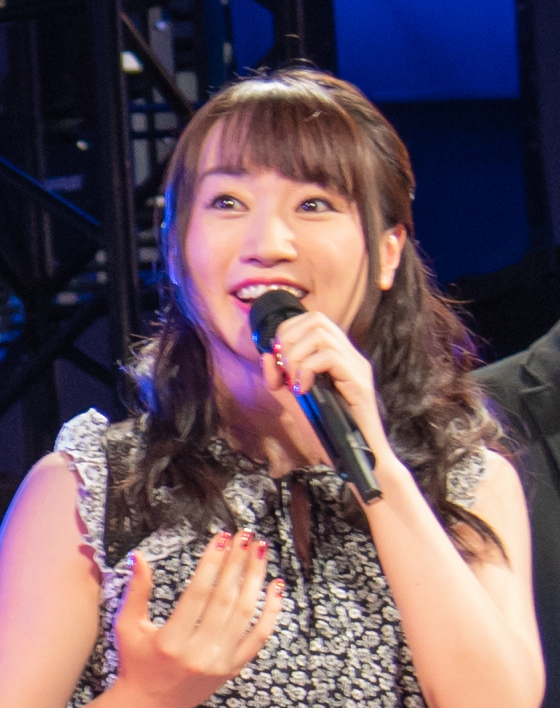
Nana Mizuki (pictured 2018) was one of the first voice actors marketed as an idol.

- Idol voice actors (アイドル声優, Aidoru seiyū): Since the 1970s, several voice actors of anime and video games also held successful singing careers in addition to voice acting. Early examples of voice actors who had an idol-like presence were Mobile Suit Gundam voice actors Toshio Furukawa and Toru Furuya in the 1970s, who gained a sizeable female following after forming their band, Slapstick. In the 1980s, idol singer Noriko Hidaka eventually became a voice actress after gaining recognition for playing lead in Touch. Beginning in the 1990s, several voice actors held successful concurrent singing careers alongside of voice acting, such as Hekiru Shiina, Mariko Kouda, and Megumi Hayashibara. As the anime industry began producing more late-night series in the 2000s, the term "idol voice actor" was popularized when more voice actors with a cultivated fan following began appearing on television. While previous examples involved voice actors who incidentally drew in fans through their singing careers or former idol singers who turned to voice acting, Yui Horie, Yukari Tamura, and Nana Mizuki were intentionally produced and marketed as idol voice actors by their record labels. Around the time when the Idol Warring Period was occurring during the mid-to-late 2000s, there was a significant boom in idols voice acting in anime, with Oricon naming Aya Hirano and Koharu Kusumi as examples, as both of them were established actresses and singers in mainstream Japanese entertainment before entering voice acting. Hirano, in particular, was strongly marketed as an idol at the height of her voice acting career, from the late 2000s to the early 2010s. While character song tie-ins were already common in the film industry by then, some voice actors also began making crossover television, stage, and concert appearances as their characters as well, leading them to be closely associated with one another.
- Japanese-Korean idols (日韓アイドル, Nikkan aidoru): While Japan and South Korea agencies have created collaborative idol groups in the past, with Route 0 in 2002, during the third Korean wave in the mid-to-late 2010s, the term saw usage again to refer to collaborative idol groups promoting primarily in Japan, but with music, styling, marketing, and presentation produced in the K-pop industry. The earliest example is Iz*One in 2018, followed by JO1 in 2019 and NiziU in 2020.

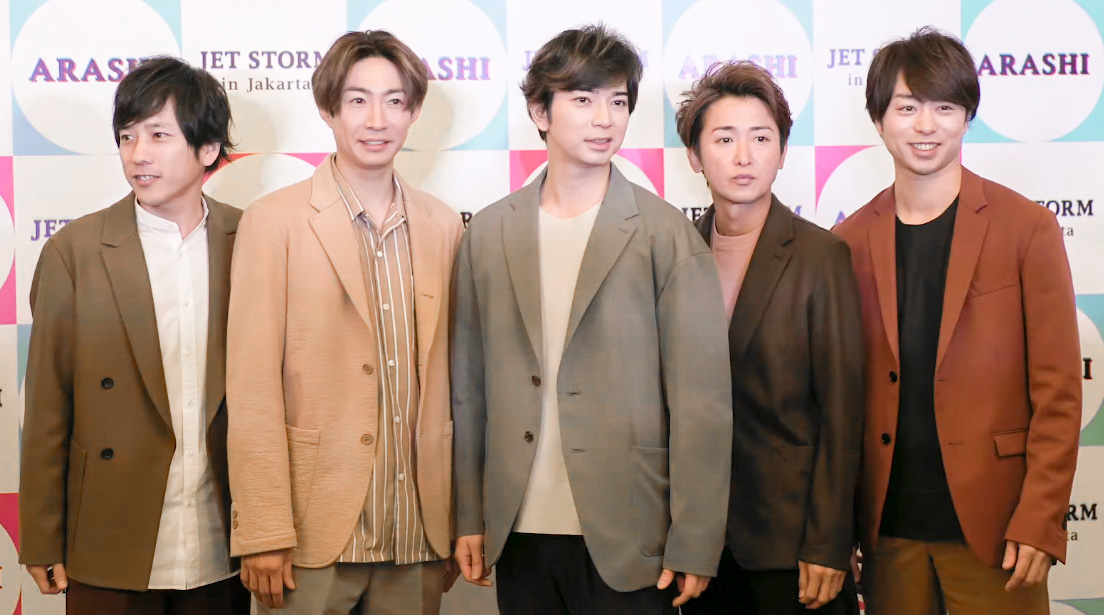
Arashi (pictured 2019) is a best-selling male idol group from Johnny & Associates.

- Johnny's (ジャニーズ, Janīzu): Male idols contracted to Johnny & Associates are nicknamed "Johnny's idols" by the media and include groups such as SMAP and Arashi, who have led strong careers both individually and as a group. Since the company was founded in 1962 by Johnny Kitagawa, who is credited for pioneering the idol trainee system and popularizing the performance aspect of modern idols, the company has held a monopoly over the male idol industry in Japan, with Kitagawa pressuring the media to reduce coverage on male idols from other companies until his death in 2019. Johnny's idols also rarely get negative press such as scandals due to Kitagawa's influence on the media.
- Junior idols (ジュニアアイドル, junia aidoru): Junior idols are singers and gravure models who generally are 15 years old and younger. Junior models first grew in popularity in 1995, when child magazine models became popular for their youthfulness and innocence, beginning with the elementary school girls featured in the covers of the magazine Panja. In addition, in 1997, the magazine Nicola was launched, featuring elementary and middle school girls as their core demographic. At the center of the phenomenon's popularity were Sayaka Yoshino and Yuka Nomura, child actresses and models who became popular in Japanese media. In the following years, it led to what the media named the "Chidol Boom" (チャイドルブーム), with the term "chidol" (a combination of the words "child" and "idol") coined by journalist Akio Nakamori in the magazine Weekly Spa! in 1999. In the 2000s, "chidol" saw fewer usage, and it was eventually replaced by the term "junior idol" to legitimize them as part of the idol industry as well as removing the focus on their age. While the industry is still considered legal in Japan, it has been criticized for sexual exploitation of minors. Many junior idol distributors closed after possession of child pornography was outlawed in Japan in 2014.

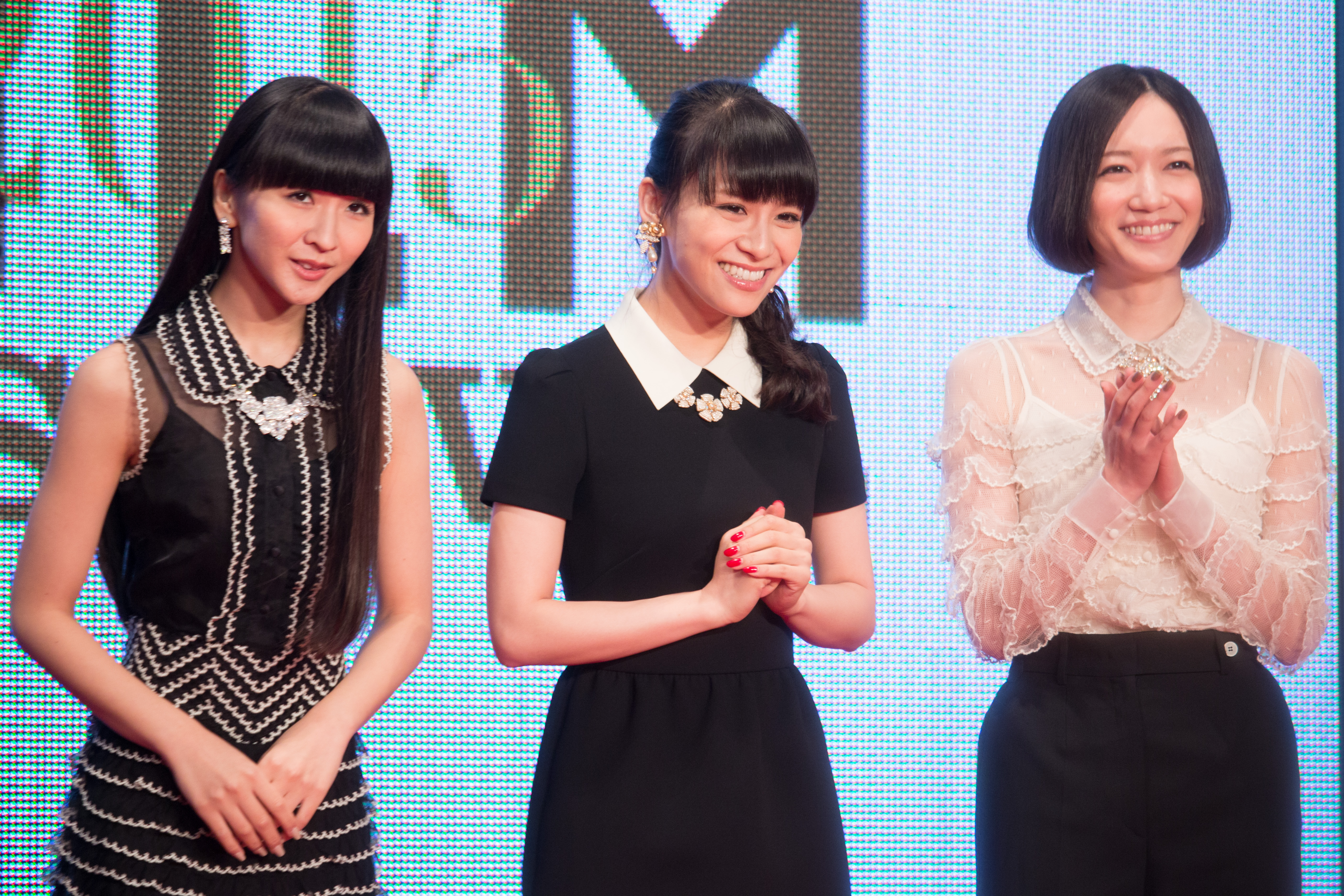
Perfume (pictured 2015) began as a local idol group performing in Hiroshima.

- Local idols (ローカルアイドル, Rōkaru aidoru): Also written as gotōji aidoru (ご当地アイドル) and chihō aidoru (地方アイドル) or shortened as "locodol" (ロコドル, rokodoru), local idols primarily promote in rural areas in their specific communities, where accessibility to celebrities is limited. The emergence of local idols was traced back to the early 2000s with Perfume and Negicco. The "Idol Warring Period" in the 2010s led to an increase in the number of local idols, with the 2013 television drama Amachan inspiring an accelerated growth. Journalist Mamoru Onoda estimates there are approximately 2,000 local idols active as of 2021. Most of the local idol groups are independently managed, relying on popularity through word-of-mouth. Several local idol groups who have crossed into mainstream media in the 2010s are Rev. from DVL and Dorothy Little Happy, the former after a photo of then-member Kanna Hashimoto went viral on the Internet.
- Net idols (ネットアイドル, Netto aidoru): Net idols are Internet celebrities who emerged with the accessibility of the Internet in the 1990s, using self-made websites and blogs to discuss their daily lives. Net idols currently conduct the majority of their activities through video streaming websites and social media beginning in the 2000s. Around March 2007, dance covers (known as odottemita (踊ってみた; lit. "I tried dancing")) became popular on video-sharing websites such as Niconico, which in turn led people into performing choreographed dances from anime series and idol groups. Notable creators of dance covers, known as odorite (踊り手), who later debuted as idols include Kozue Aikawa from Danceroid and Dempagumi.inc, Beckii Cruel, and Keekihime.
- Virtual idols (バーチャルアイドル, Bāchuaru aidoru): Virtual idols are digital avatars representing a fictional character or persona. The first fictional idol gaining mainstream crossover was Lynn Minmay from Macross in the 1980s. In 1997, Kyoko Date was created as the first virtual idol. In 2007, Crypton Future Media released Hatsune Miku as its latest addition to the Vocaloid software, who subsequently saw positive reception from amateur songwriters, with her character and music based on user-generated content. Virtual online streamer Kizuna AI, who first appeared in 2016, led to a boom of Virtual YouTubers who similarly conduct their activities through a digital avatar on YouTube and other streaming websites.

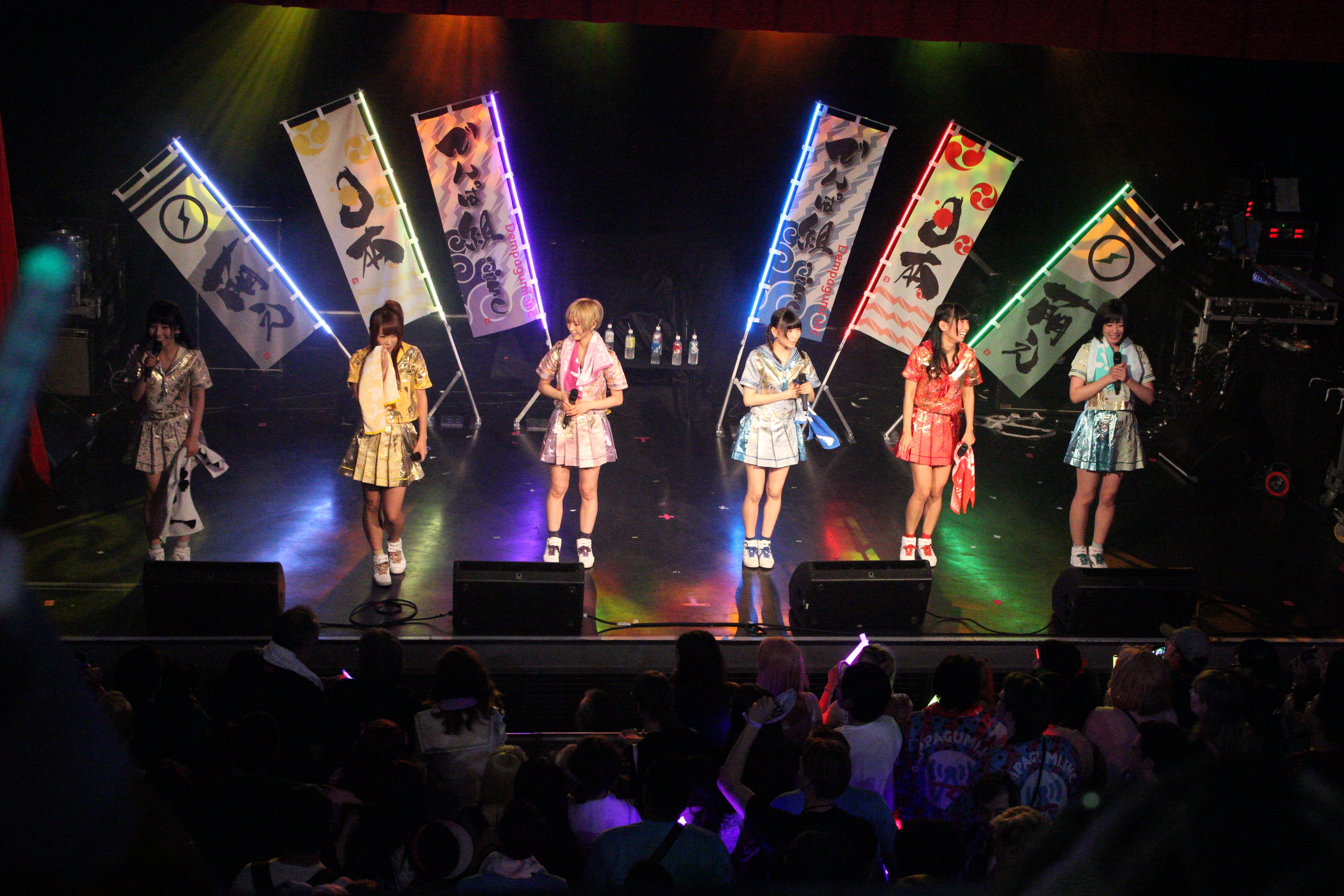
Dempagumi.inc (pictured 2015) is an Akiba-kei idol group, with music and performances influenced by the otaku culture in Akihabara.

- Underground idols (地下アイドル, Chika aidoru): Underground idols are independently managed idols who perform at small venues. They are also known as live idols (ライブアイドル, raibu aidoru) or indies idols (インディーズアイドル, indīzu aidoru). Underground idols first emerged in the 1990s when idol groups with large numbers of members began appearing after the popularity of Onyanko Club. Tama Himeno and Kamen Joshi member Tomoka Igari, both underground idols, describe them as being different from mainstream idols (nicknamed "above-ground idols" (地上アイドル, chijō aidoru)) in that underground idols are active through live performances rather than through exposure from mass media or CD releases through major record labels, thus making them more accessible to fans in comparison to mainstream idols. An example Igari used to describe close relationships that underground idols have with their fans is that underground idols will hold handshake events and take instant camera photos (known as "cheki" (チェキ)) with fans after every live performance.
  - Akiba-kei idols (アキバ系アイドル, Akiba-kei aidoru; lit. "Akihabara-style idols"): Akiba-kei idols are type of underground idol based in the Akihabara district of Tokyo, drawing influences from its otaku culture. Music from Akiba-kei idols are generally sold as self-published CDs at Comiket or promoted through Niconico. Akihabara Dear Stage is a dedicated venue where they perform. While Akiba-kei idols are niche, Haruko Momoi and Dempagumi.inc are cited as an examples of an Akiba-kei idols crossing over to mainstream media. Dempagumi.inc's music producer, Maiko Fukushima, describes the music from Akiba-kei idols as distinct from anime songs, with most composers being "amateurs" and its organic music culture facing a state of the Galapagos syndrome, as they had no direct creative input from J-pop or other music genres. However, Fukushima noted that songs from R-18 games were also key components of Akiba-kei music. In 2007, Vocaloid greatly influenced the growth of Akiba-kei music and idol culture. AKB48, one of Japan's most recognized idol groups nationwide, originated from Akihabara, but it is not considered an Akiba-kei group.
  - Alternative idols: Alternative idols, also known as alt-idols or anti-idols, is a term coined by English-speaking communities to describe idol singers who have an image concept and music different from what is considered mainstream, such as having darker images and alternative rock. The alternative idol scene was pioneered by Bis and Seiko Oomori and made popular by Bis' successor Bish.

== History ==
=== 1960–1980: Post-war era and idol beginnings ===
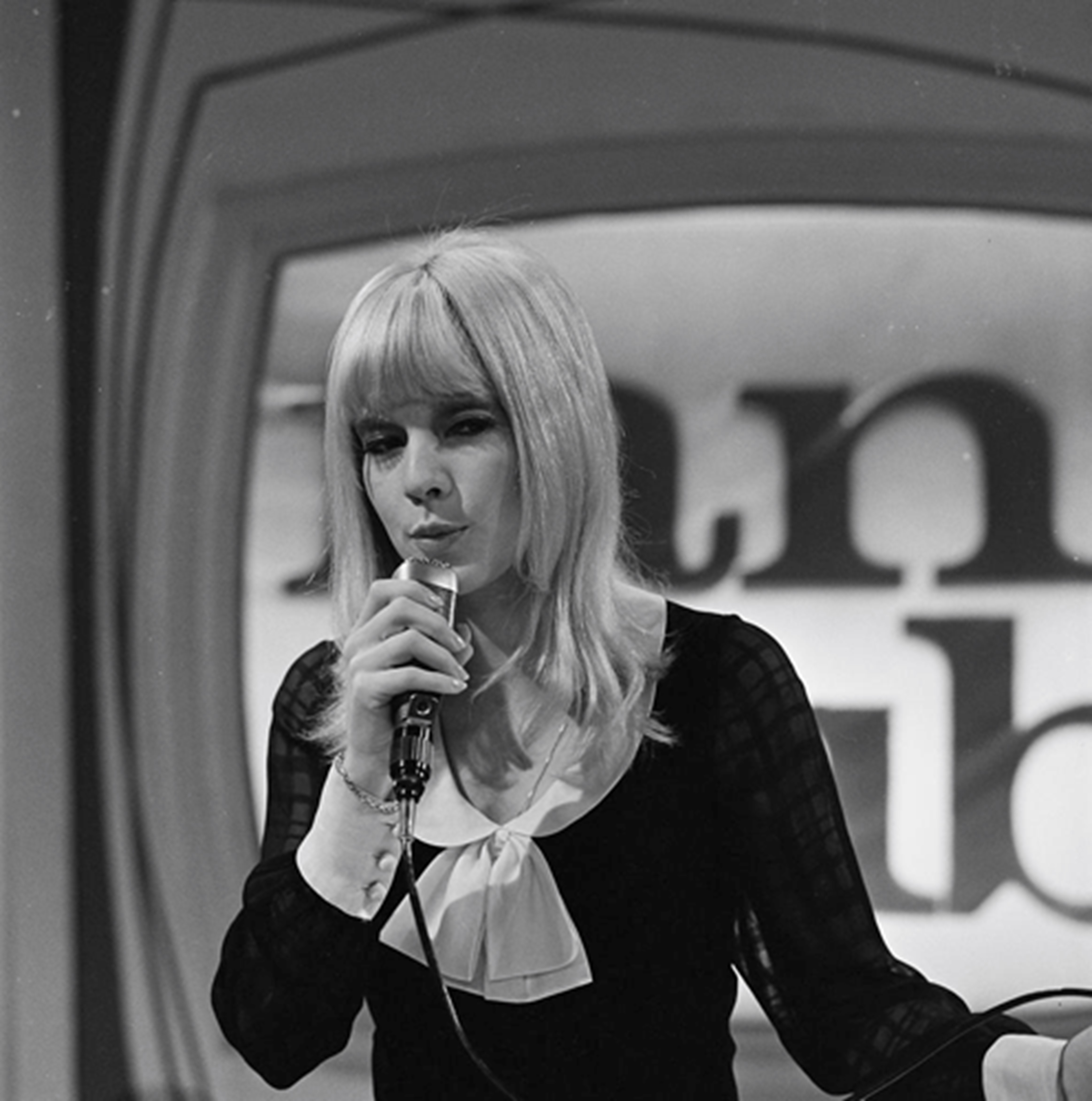
Sylvie Vartan (pictured 1966) is the codifier of the term "idol", after her appearance in the film Cherchez l'idole (1964) was well received in Japan.

The popularity of young female singers can be traced back to Sayuri Yoshinaga in the 1960s, as well as the 1913 Takarazuka Revue and theater shows from the Meiji era. In 1962, Johnny Kitagawa founded Johnny & Associates and created the group Johnnys, which is retroactively considered the first idol group in Japan. He is also credited with pioneering the idol trainee system, where talents would be accepted in the agency at a young age and train not only in singing, but also dancing and acting, until they were ready for debut. However, the concept of an idol was not defined by mainstream Japanese media until in November 1964, when the 1963 French film Cherchez l'idole was released in Japan under the title Aidoru o Sagase (アイドルを探せ). Many Japanese audiences took interest in Sylvie Vartan, whose song "La plus belle pour aller danser" from the film sold more than a million copies in Japan. Vartan was heralded for her youthful, adorable looks and musical talent, leading the Japanese entertainment industry to assign the word "idol" to singers who shared a similar aesthetic.

Television greatly impacted the popularity of the idol phenomenon, as beginning in the 1970s, many idols were recruited through audition programs. In addition, the availability of having home television sets gave audiences greater accessibility of seeing idols at any time compared to going to theaters. Momoe Yamaguchi, Junko Sakurada, Saori Minami, and Mari Amachi, some of the idols recruited through television, were some of the more popular figures of this era, along with groups such as Candies and Pink Lady. Saori Minami, who debuted in 1971, was noted by scholar Masayoshi Sakai to be the turning point of when teenage stars became popular in mainstream media. Music was produced by a shared climate of songwriters and art directors seeking a step towards a depoliticized youth culture. Idols grew in popularity over the 1970s, as they offered audiences escapism from political violence and radical student movements.

Idols at the time were seen as ephemeral because of how short-lived their careers were, and how they would disappear from the public after retirement. In public, idols took steps to play a distinct character and uphold an illusion of perfection, such as maintaining a virginal image. Other examples include being told not to use restrooms in public and answering interview questions about their favorite food with feminine-sounding answers such as "strawberries" and "shortcake."

=== 1980–1990: Golden Age of Idols ===
The influence idols had on television led the 1980s to be known as the "Golden Age of Idols", in part due to Japan's economic bubble and growing commercial interest in them. Several figures who defined the Golden Age of Idols are Seiko Matsuda, Akina Nakamori, Kyōko Koizumi, and Onyanko Club. Television programs in which idols appeared often enjoyed high viewer ratings. Dentsu also created the "CM idol" business model, where idols were able to gain fame by singing and appearing in commercials.

Onyanko Club, in particular, shifted public perception of idols from professional stars to ordinary schoolgirls who would gain experience throughout their career. They were also the first group to introduce a "graduation system", where older members would eventually leave the group while newer inexperienced members would join, with the system being named such as the group drew similarities to a school club. Onyanko Club also led to idols becoming closely associated with television due to the popularity of their variety show, as the visual component became important to the overall enjoyment of their music.

At the same time, male idols gained popularity, with acts from Johnny & Associates normalizing idols singing and dancing at the same time. However, fewer male idol acts from other companies achieved the same success as Johnny's idols due to the company's CEO, Johnny Kitagawa, controlling the media and pressuring certain programs not to invite male idols from competing agencies, as he would continue to until his death in 2019.

=== 1990–2000: Idol Winter Period and Chidol Boom ===
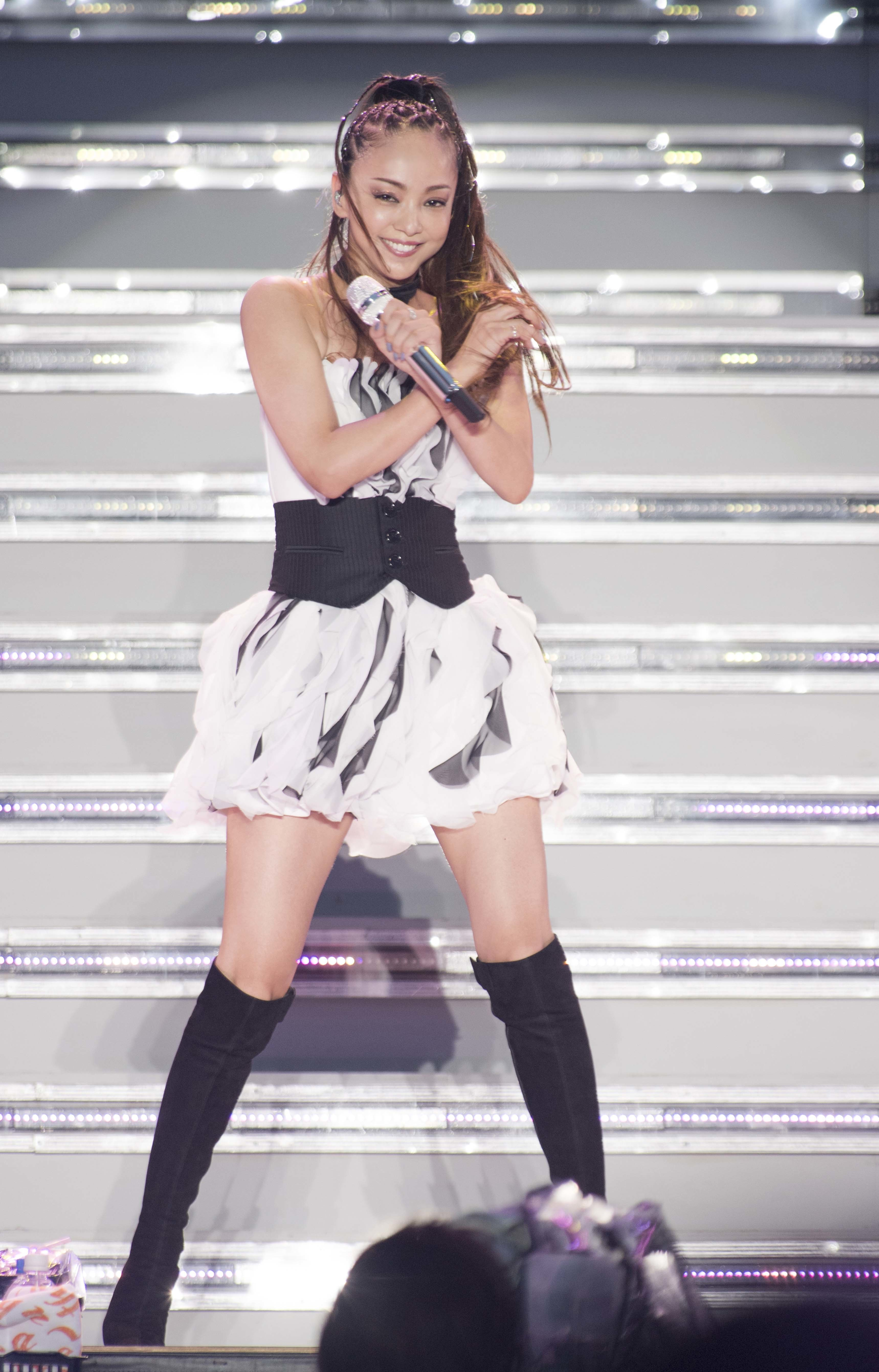
Namie Amuro (pictured 2017) saw popularity among girls in the 1990s, despite rejecting the idol label.

Around 1985, idols soon became unpopular after the public became disillusioned with the idol system. By the 1990s, public interest in idols began to wane, as audiences lost interest in singing and audition programs, particularly due to a shift in attitudes caused by Japan's economic collapse. The media coined the term "Idol Winter Period" (アイドル冬の時代, Aidoru Fuyu no Jidai) to describe the stagnation of the idol industry beginning in 1990.

More young people yielded aspirations to be defined as an artist instead of an idol. During this decline, public perception of idols again shifted from inexperienced amateurs to strong, independent women, in part due to a rehaul in Seiko Matsuda's public image. Namie Amuro, who gained fame as the lead singer of Super Monkey's, found popularity among young girls who emulated her appearance. At the same time, Speed also found a fan following. However, neither Amuro nor Speed referred to themselves under the idol label. While idols appeared less in mainstream media, the popularity of Onyanko Club from the 1980s led to an increase of idol groups with large numbers of members debuting in the 1990s, performing under independent record labels. These idols became known as underground idols. Because of the lack of publicity over idols on television, many turned to the Internet.

Johnny & Associates observed the popularity of former Shibugakitai member Hirohide Yakumaru's success as an MC on variety shows, which prompted them to develop and market their current acts with distinct public personalities. Groups from the company began gaining more attention, drawing in fans from Hong Kong and Taiwan, and their marketing success led to many other idols doing the same.

In the mid-1990s, there was an increase in young idols in the elementary school age, which the media described as the "Chidol (child idol) Boom." The term "chidol" was coined by journalist Akio Nakamori in the magazine Weekly Spa! In the 2000s, "chidol" saw fewer usage, and it was eventually replaced by the term "junior idol" to legitimize them as part of the idol industry as well as removing the focus on their age.

=== 2000–2020: Media crossovers and Idol Warring Period ===
The 2000s saw the rise in popularity of idol groups again after Morning Musume's debut in 1997 and the formation of their musical collective, Hello! Project. Around the same time, there was an increase in gravure idols, who competed in magazine and photo book sales. In addition, anime voice actors, such as Yui Horie, Nana Mizuki, and Yukari Tamura, were also marketed as idols to promote both their activities and singing careers.

While idols briefly experienced another decline after 2002, AKB48 debuted in 2005 and later became known as nation's idol group. The public image of idols had diversified, with each idol group having a specific concept appealing to different audiences. To celebrate the diversity of idols, AKB48, Shoko Nakagawa, and Leah Dizon performed a medley called "Special Medley: Latest Japan Proud Culture" at the 58th Kohaku Uta Gassen in 2007, introduced as "Akiba-kei idols" with each act described as a different sub-genre of idols.

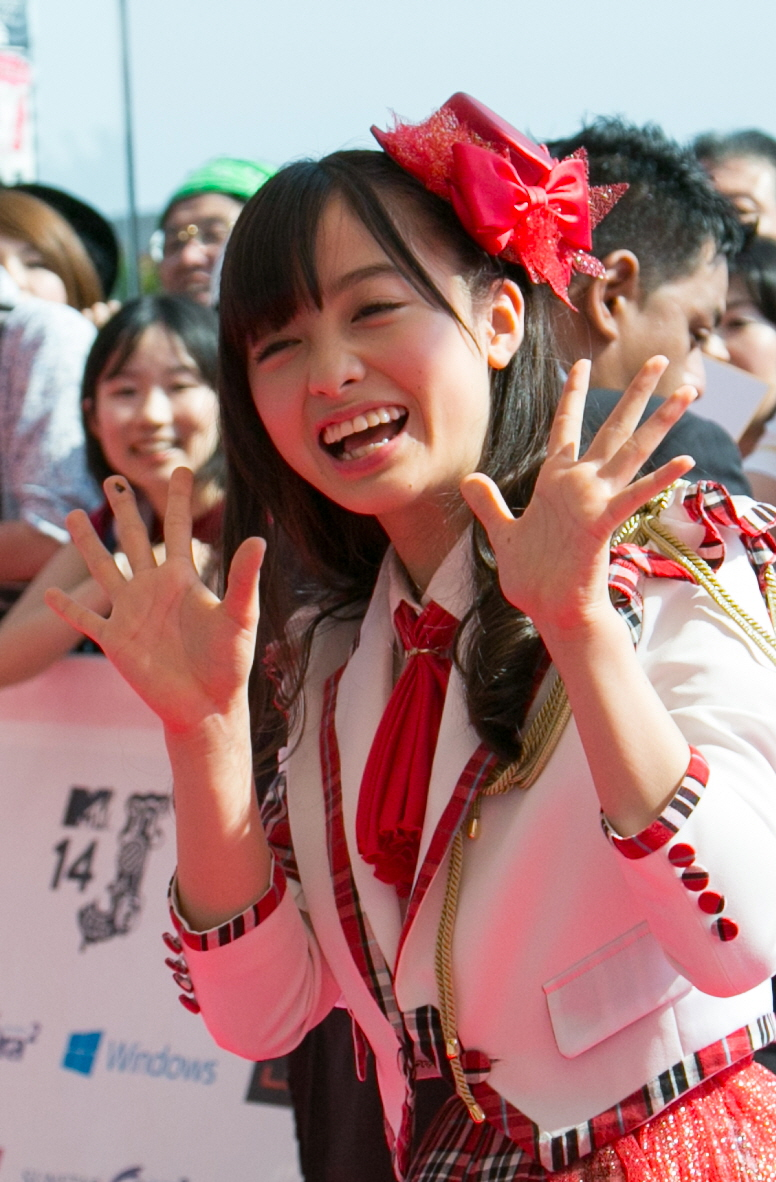
Kanna Hashimoto (pictured 2014), then a member of Rev. from DVL, performed as a local idol in Fukuoka. After a fan-taken photo went viral in 2013, Rev. from DVL crossed over to mainstream media.

The idol industry experienced a rapid growth in the beginning of the 2010s, and the media coined the nickname "Idol Warring Period" (アイドル戦国時代, Aidoru Sengoku Jidai) to describe the phenomenon. Lawyer Kunitaka Kasai cited the Internet as a reason for the rapid growth of idols, as anyone can upload videos onto websites, and AKB48's business model encouraged this even further through creating more opportunities for fan interactivity. The 2013 television drama Amachan also inspired more idol groups to appear, the majority of them being "local idols" who performed in specific rural communities. Several independent idol groups also crossed over into mainstream, such as Dempagumi.inc, Dorothy Little Happy, and Rev. from DVL, the latter of which gained mainstream popularity after a photo of then-member Kanna Hashimoto went viral.

Since 2010, the biggest idol concert festival, Tokyo Idol Festival, has taken place. More than 200 idol groups and about 1500 idols performed, attracting more than 80,000 spectators in 2017. During 2014, about 486,000 people attended AKB48 and Momoiro Clover Z's live concerts, which was the highest record of all female musicians in Japan. Momoiro Clover Z has been ranked as the most popular female idol group from 2013 to 2017 according to surveys by The Nikkei, There were more than 10,000 teenage girls who performed as idols in Japan in 2017. In 2019, there were over 3,000 female idol groups.

From 2013 to 2018, boy band Arashi was ranked as the most popular artist overall in Japan according to Oricon polls of 20,000 people. Other male idols also found success as underground idols, as well as anime media mix projects and 2.5D musicals.

In the early 2010s, the diversification of the idol industry led to several acts mixing pop music with other musical genres such as alternative rock and heavy metal; this was pioneered by Bis and Seiko Oomori and was given the sub-category "alternative idol" by English-speaking publications. They have also been known for utilising shock value to gain public and media attention and making use of a darker image than that of the idol scene norm.

Beginning in the mid-to-late 2010s, the Japanese idol industry crossed over with K-pop with the third Korean wave in Japan, which was sparked partially from positive reception of the Japanese members of the South Korean group Twice. In the years that followed, several Japanese and South Korean companies collaborated to form K-pop influenced groups for a global consumer base, such as Iz*One, JO1, and NiziU.

=== 2020–present: Globalization ===
In the early 2020s, more idol groups began releasing music on global digital platforms due in part to the disruption caused by the COVID-19 pandemic. The mid-2020s saw a renewed interest in kawaii-oriented idol music.

== Cultural significance ==
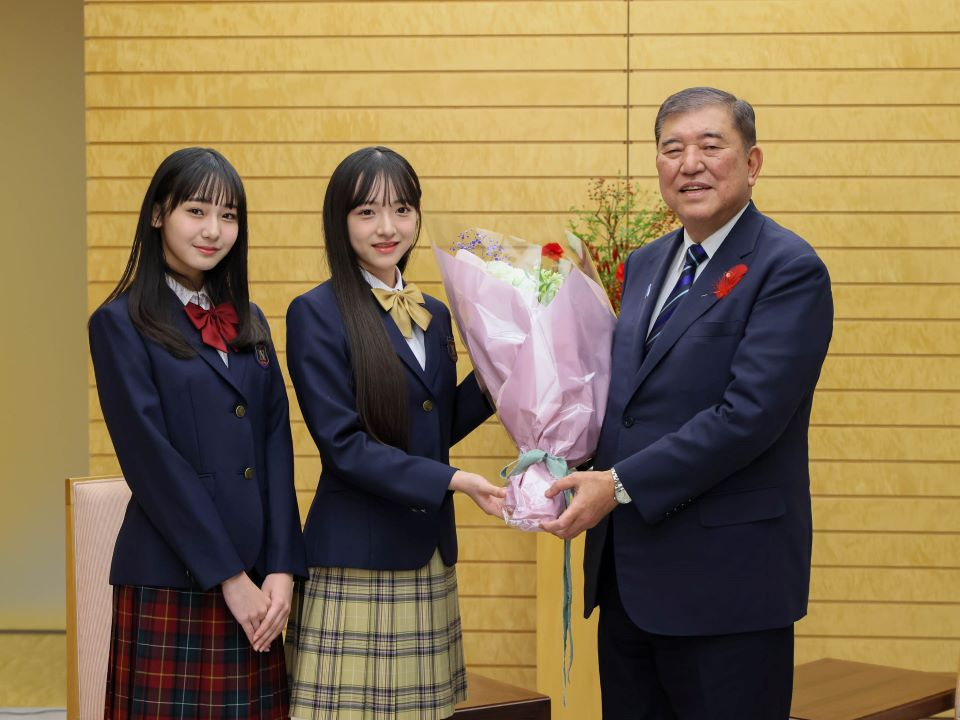
Japanese Prime Minister Shigeru Ishiba with idols from the Nicola magazine

In Japan, idol culture is deeply embedded in participatory practices and emotional investment, offering fans opportunities for identification, encouragement, and shared experience. Fans are drawn not only to the final performances but to the visible process of growth and effort. This engagement is shaped by uniquely Japanese cultural values, where imperfection and personal development are viewed positively rather than as flaws.

Supporting idols is often understood as an emotionally reciprocal act. Research shows that fans experience strong affective ties based on admiration, shared goals, and empathy. These dimensions are especially influential in promoting long-term support behaviors such as attending events or purchasing goods. Rather than passively consuming entertainment, fans actively participate in idols’ development through cheering, voting, gifting, and public expression of support. This contributes to a unique dynamic where idols’ growth is not only observed but co-experienced by their supporters.

A recurring theme in idol fandom is the aesthetic appreciation of “immaturity” (未熟さ) — a cultural pattern also observed in traditional arts, where audiences value the formative stages of a performer's journey. This “growth-as-value” principle is central to the emotional structure of idol support. Fans often speak of “polishing” or “nurturing” idols, taking pride in watching them evolve from uncertain novices into confident performers.

Idol culture also fosters a strong sense of community. Fans frequently report that their engagement includes a social dimension — interacting with others who share their admiration, exchanging information, and building shared narratives around their favorite performers. According to recent mixed-method research, such social behaviors differ across subgroups of fans, but emotional involvement and the desire for connection are common across degrees of fandom.

Idols, in turn, acknowledge this dynamic by recognizing fan support as integral to their own motivation and public image. The system is sustained by mutual validation, where idols express gratitude and fans find meaning in being part of the growth narrative. These aspects make idol culture not just a commercial or entertainment practice, but a culturally embedded form of shared aspiration and emotional co-creation.

== Fan culture ==
=== Fan activities ===
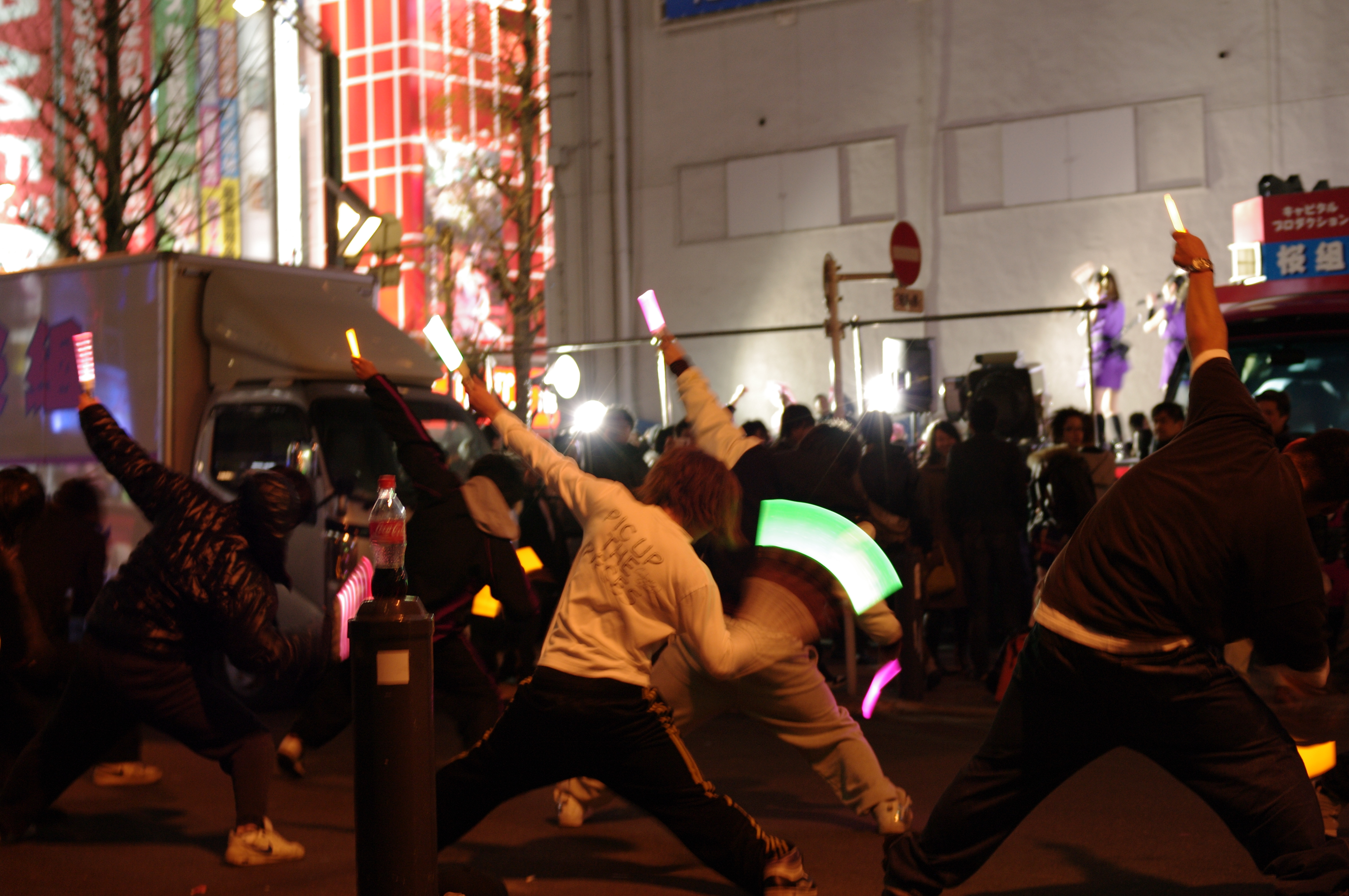
A crowd of wota perform wotagei at an idol concert in Akihabara in 2011.

External videos
- Cute - Cutie Circuit 2011; Fans are swaying glow sticks in the color of their favorite band member and cheering their idols with chants. When a Cute member sings a solo line, everyone shouts her name. (For example, from 2:11: "Maimi!", "Airi!", "Maimi!", "Airi!")
- Momoiro Clover - "Z Densetsu". The audience is filled with fans dressed in the color of their favorite Momoiro Clover Z member.

Passionate male fans of idols are colloquially referred to as wota (ヲタ), derived from the word "otaku." Beginning in the 1980s, they formed cheering groups known as bodyguards (親衛隊, shin'eitai) to support idols at concerts and public appearances. During these events, the wota perform wotagei, an organized sequence of fan chants and dancing to show appreciation for the idols. Fan chants where an idol's name is called after each bar is sung was popularized by Mari Amachi's fans in the 1970s.

Because mainstream Japanese media exercises self-censorship over taboo, controversial subjects, fans are influential in circulating under-reported news through social media.

Idol fan culture has introduced several slang terms into the Japanese public, including:

- DD, an abbreviation for daredemo daisuki (誰でも大好き; lit. "I love everyone"), applying to people who do not have a favorite member or group. The term has negative connotations. Writer Riyan suggests that while there are fans with no favorite members or groups, they are not likely to identify themselves as DD. A variation of DD is the word hako oshi (箱推し; lit. "supporter of the whole package"), which indicates support for an idol group.
- Oshimen (推しメン), also shortened to oshi (推し), is a favorite member or group

=== Fan interactions ===
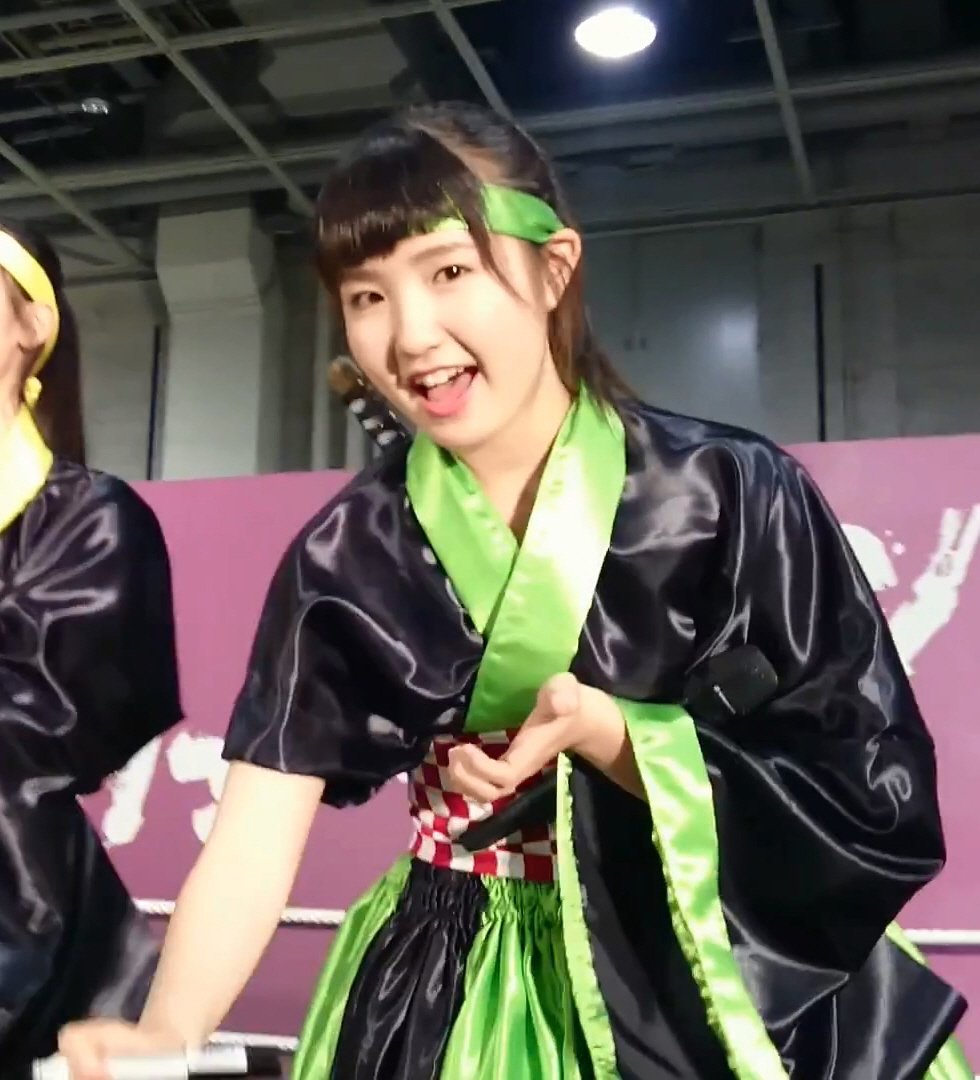
Hitomi Honda interacts with a fan at an AKB48 handshake event in 2017.

A notable trait of idols that sets them apart from typical celebrities is their relationship with fans, and they are marketed intentionally by talent agencies to have a high emotional connection with their consumer fan base. Fans are built as active supporters into the narrative of the idol's journey to become a professional entertainer, not only to appearance or performance but to the sense of shared journey and personal development that idols embody. Fans may view them as siblings, daughters/sons, or girl/boy next door types due to how easily they can relate to the public. One documented example are fans of female idols, typically consisting of men from 30 to 40 years of age, who seek interactions with them as a way of having a long-term relationship without the prospect of supporting a family or dealing with awkwardness outside of a controlled environment. The idol fan culture idealizes the idea of moe, where vulnerability is seen as an attractive trait.

Using idols from Johnny & Associates as an example, male idols appeal to female fans by representing a pseudo-romantic ideal for them. However, there are some female fans, particularly in Japan, who prefer to put themselves in the role of an external observer. For them, the absence of other women is a way of watching the male idols interact with one another and imagining their interactions to be similar to boys' love.

To foster a closeness between idols and fans, some talent agencies offer meet-and-greets in the form of handshake events, where fans have the opportunity to shake hands, take a photograph, and speak briefly with the idols. These events and activities, where there is direct communication between idols and their fans, provide emotional support and reinforce fans' sense of community and pride. AKB48's business model created more opportunities for fan interactions with their "idols you can meet" concept. An example of this are their elections, where fans can vote for their favorite member, thereby including the fans directly into the members' individual success. Idols also utilize blogs and social media to display personal and relatable aspects of their lives, fostering empathy and closeness with their audience. Fans spend money on merchandise and endorsed products to directly support their favorites, comparing it to spending money on "loved ones"; some express feeling happy that they were able to make someone they admired happy. Dedicated fans may give up their careers and devote their life savings to supporting and following their favorite members. Because idols share an intimate relationship with their fans, fans may feel "betrayed" if idols reveal unfavorable parts of their personal lives that are different from the image they present, or break the illusion that they are there exclusively for fans.

== Impact ==
=== Economic ===
Idols often appear in advertising, with 50–70% of commercials in Japan featuring an idol. The "CM idol" business model, conceptualized by advertising agency Dentsu in the 1980s, uses idols' public image as a marketing asset. As the career of idols are dependent on their image, contracting offices create their image based upon trends in the market and with the intent of generating as much revenue as possible. Along with promoting products, commercials are also a cross-platform to promote idols at the same time by keeping both brand and idol product in the forefront of the consumers' minds. Pitches for commercials are often made with a specific idol who matches the company's image in mind. Idols contracted to particular brands are expected to uphold the brand's image and may not work for competing brands or networks; the agreement extends to magazine advertisements, online videos, and appearances in dramas. Idols may also provide the music or jingle for commercials. The idol industry makes approximately $1 billion a year.

=== Media ===
Beginning in the 1980s, companies would compete to secure contracts for idols in dramas, which led to the current four-season television cour in Japan. Variety, talk, and music shows also became popular, in part for featuring idols as guests or the stars of the show.

==== Anime and video games ====
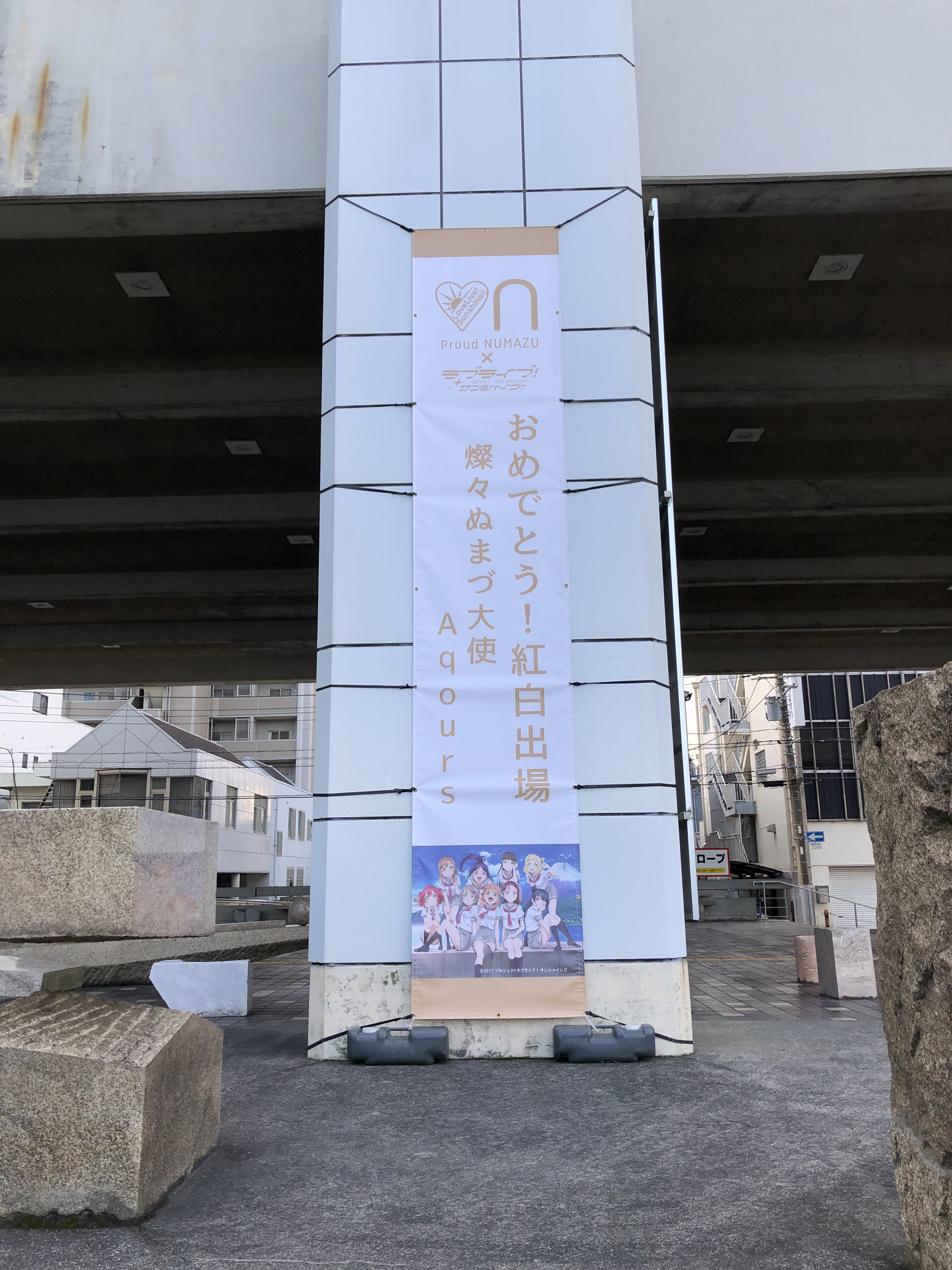
A banner posted at Numazu City Hall celebrates the fictional idol group Aqours, from the anime series Love Live! Sunshine!!, for being accepted as a participating performer in the 2018 Kōhaku Uta Gassen.

The idol industry has crossed over to anime and video games. Using a media mix strategy, various multimedia projects have used fictional idols to market Japanese pop culture and anison music. The series Creamy Mami, the Magic Angel was the first notable anime series to use a media mix marketing strategy, where Takako Ōta would provide the voice to the main character and portray her at music events; the series was used as a vehicle to launch her singing career. The first fictional idol to cross over to mainstream media is Lynn Minmay from Macross, whose 1984 single, "Ai Oboete Imasu ka", charted at #7 on the Oricon Weekly Singles Chart. In the late 2000s, Vocaloid software Hatsune Miku was received positively among amateur music producers, who used her as an avatar to perform their compositions, influencing Akiba-kei music.

In the early 2010s, idol-themed multimedia projects, such as Love Live!, The Idolmaster, and Uta no Prince-sama, became popular. Professor Marc Steinberg suggested that the popularity of idol-related media mix projects may stem from the managerial aspect found in life simulation games, with The Idolmaster being the first notable idol franchise to include this. These franchises set the fans in the active contributing role of the "producer" and regularly involved interactivity, as input made by the players were crucial to the idols' success. The growth of idol-related media mix projects in anime and video games was also seen as an attempt from the Japanese government to market Japanese pop culture overseas through the Cool Japan initiative. Music produced by voice actor idols and fictional idols have crossed over to mainstream music charts, with Billboard Japan launching the Billboard Japan Hot Animation Chart on December 1, 2010, exclusively for anime and video game music releases. Fictional idols have been treated like real-life celebrities. Idol-themed anime and video game series have been compared to the sports genre in anime due to a similar competitive nature and team-building the characters face, as well as being linked to the Odagiri effect for featuring attractive people of the same gender interacting with each other.

The idol fan culture is heavily tied to anime and manga, and most fans of anime are also fans of idols. The idea of "moe", which was popularized by anime, can be projected onto both idols and fictional characters, linking the two. Some may prefer fictional idols due to them never disbanding, leaving groups, or getting into scandals. A 2005 study by the Nomura Research Institute revealed that idol fans were the third largest group of otaku interests, following comics and anime.

In the late-2010s, the idol agency influenced the business model of VTuber agencies such as Hololive and Nijisanji—which focus on a mix of video game livestreaming, entertainment, and music.

=== Criticism ===
==== Working conditions ====
The idol system has been criticized for its strict rules, intense work schedules, and offering idols little control over their personal lives. The system has been likened to salarymen in Japan who are unable to disobey their employers. Labor rights activist Shohei Sakagura stated that idols get very little revenue and are ill-prepared for the work force after leaving their groups, as many of them spend their academic years learning poor job skills. In addition to this, Rob Schwartz from Billboard addressed that Japanese mainstream media outlets rarely bring attention to controversies and allegations of power harassment due to self-censorship on what they are allowed to write. Sasetsu Takeda of GQ Japan wrote that talent agencies dismiss idols regardless of their popularity, sometimes intentionally blocking job offers in order to pressure them to leave, all while declaring that they are "resting from illness" to the public. Independently managed idol groups offer even less protection, with idols given ambiguously worded contracts that keep them in their companies for years, while offering almost no pay and compensation for transportation and costuming fees. Lawyer Kunitaka Kasai stated management may be poor, especially among independent idol groups, because they were established by people with a lack of experience to fill a demand for idols over the industry's growth.

Work schedules for idols have been criticized for being excessive, as idols are expected to work even when sick. Miki Gonobe from Nikkan Sports noted that idols generally do not have a labor union and agencies see no need for one, as they view idol activities akin to extracurricular activities at school. She voiced concerns about young girls becoming idols at an early age, especially elementary school students. In addition, Sasetsu Takeda of GQ Japan criticized some idol managements for intentionally preventing their talents from taking time off, mentioning it "strange" that idols are only notified of their assignments the night before. He also condemned the idol industry for not providing talents access to better mental health resources, as idols are often suspended or dismissed for publicly showing they are stressed out of concern that they may cause fans to feel worried or upset.

In March 2018, Enoha Girls member Honoka Omoto died by suicide, with her family launching a lawsuit against her talent agency in October 2018. Allegedly, Omoto was working 10 hours a day at the expense of her studies and when she had asked to leave the group, a staff member threatened her with violence while Takahiro Sasaki, the head of her managing company, told her she would have to pay a penalty fee of ¥1 million. In June 2018, a former member of Niji no Conquistador filed a lawsuit against Pixiv representative director, Hiroaki Nagata, and the group's management companies for voyeurism and sexual harassment during her time with the group, and Nagata filed a counter lawsuit for libel and resigned several days later. On February 10, 2020, the Tokyo District Court dismissed his claims and ordered him to pay ¥1.1 million to the woman in damages.

==== Dating ban ====
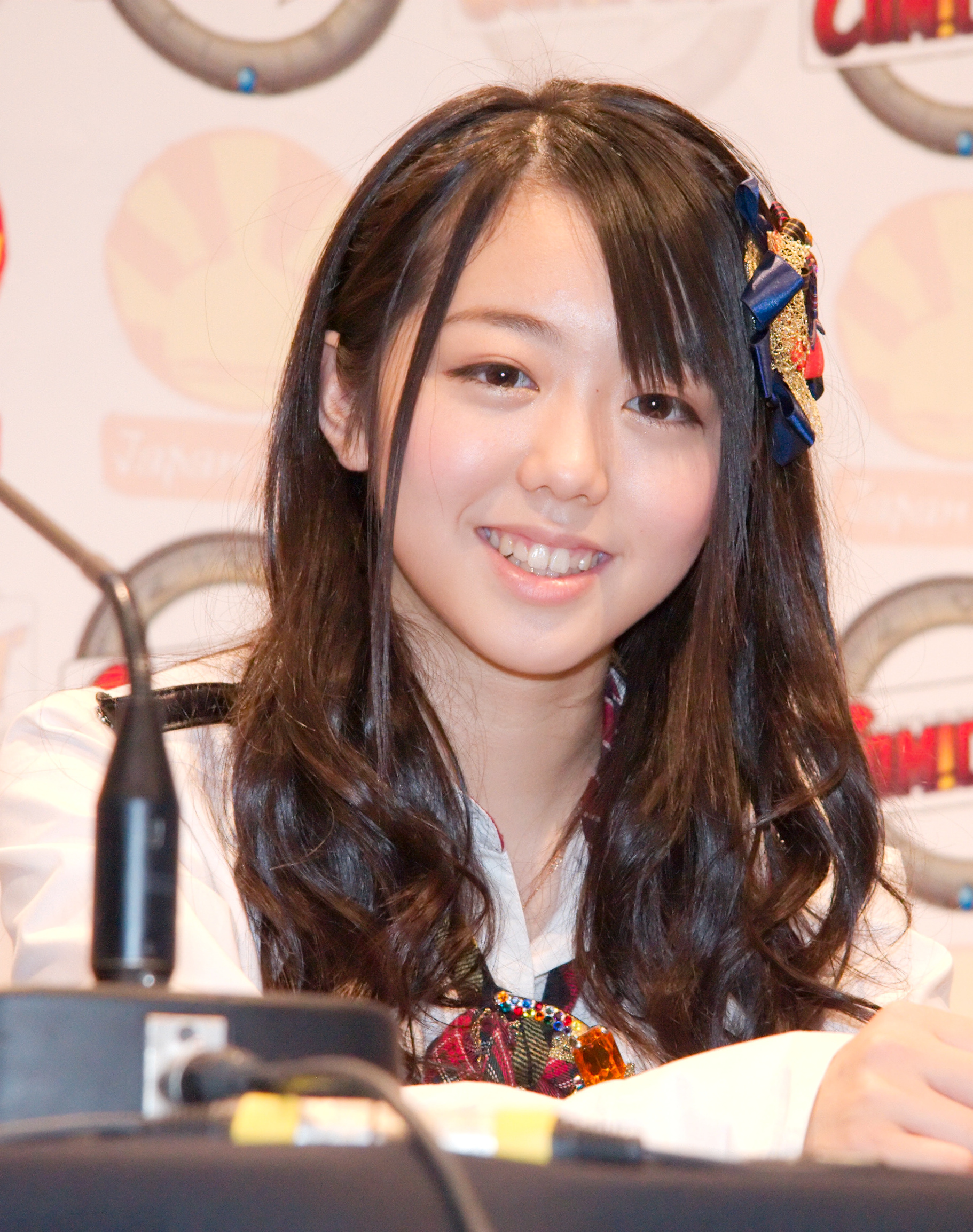
Minami Minegishi (pictured 2009) made international news in 2013 after a video of her with a shaved head as penance went viral. This followed news reports suggesting she was in a relationship, which led to her demotion in AKB48.

Most idols are not allowed to form romantic relationships or must obtain permission from their agencies to get married. Yasushi Akimoto, the producer of AKB48, likened the group's dating ban to similar dating bans for baseball teams competing at the Kōshien, where dating is seen as a distraction from preparing for tournaments. On the other hand, critics have suggested a dating ban is implemented in order to sell a fantasy of idols being accessible to their fans and disagreed with them for being inhumane. The Japan Times noted that aside from talent agencies, idol fan culture has contributed to this, especially with male fans of female idols; male fans buy into the idea of "moe", which fetishizes weakness and submissiveness while asserting "complete control" over the girls' sexual independence.

Several idols who were confirmed to have been dismissed, suspended, demoted, or forced to leave their groups following reports of them dating or having sexual relations include Mari Yaguchi, Ai Kago, Aya Hirano, Rino Sashihara, and Minami Minegishi. Minegishi, in particular, caught international media attention after her apology video went viral, causing international criticism over the management of her group, AKB48, as well as the Japanese idol industry. A talent agency filed a lawsuit against a 17-year-old former idol singer for accepting an invitation to a hotel room from two male fans, which had caused her group to disband within the first 3 months of their debut. In September 2015, Judge Akitomo Kojima, along with the Tokyo District Court, ruled in favor of the talent agency and fined the woman to pay ¥650,000, stating that the dating ban was necessary for idols to "win the support of male fans." In January 2016, a similar lawsuit filed with the Tokyo District Court ruled in favor of a 23-year-old former idol, with Judge Kazuya Hara stating that the dating ban "significantly restricts the freedom to pursue happiness."

==== Fan obsession and idol safety ====
Idol culture's focus on accessibility and direct interactions between fans and idols has led to criticism that it encourages obsession and belief in pseudo-romantic relationships between fans and idols. These criticisms received renewed attention in the 2010s following several incidents of violent attacks on female idols, including the saw attack on Anna Iriyama and Rina Kawaei, the stabbing of Mayu Tomita, and the assault of Maho Yamaguchi. CNN argued that talent agencies do not do enough to ensure idols' safety during fan interaction events, and that the nature of the industry causes some fans to become unable to distinguish between fantasy and reality in their personal interactions with idols.

==== Sexualization ====
Idols are often sexualized, especially female idols, some of whom also work as gravure idols and have suggestive swimsuit photo shoots that are published in magazines targeted towards adults. With the idol system commodifying youth, the industry is criticized for putting minors at risk, most particularly junior idols, who are aged 15 years and younger. Idol swimsuit photo books are often sold in the same sections as pornographic titles. In 1999, Japan banned production and distribution of sexually explicit depictions of minors, which outlawed photo books depicting nude junior idols. Multiple junior idol distributors closed after possession of child pornography was made illegal in Japan in 2014. However, junior idol content currently stands on legally ambiguous ground due to open interpretations of child pornography laws in Japan.

In 2017, through a survey conducted by the Japanese government, 53 out of 197 women contracted with talent agencies stated that they had been asked to take part in pornographic photo or video shoots of which were not previously disclosed nor included in their contracts. Seventeen of the women stated that they had performed the request anyway.

== See also ==
- Korean idol
- Taiwanese idol
- J-pop
- Teen idol
