= 2014 AKB48 handsaw assault =

Assault on Japanese idols

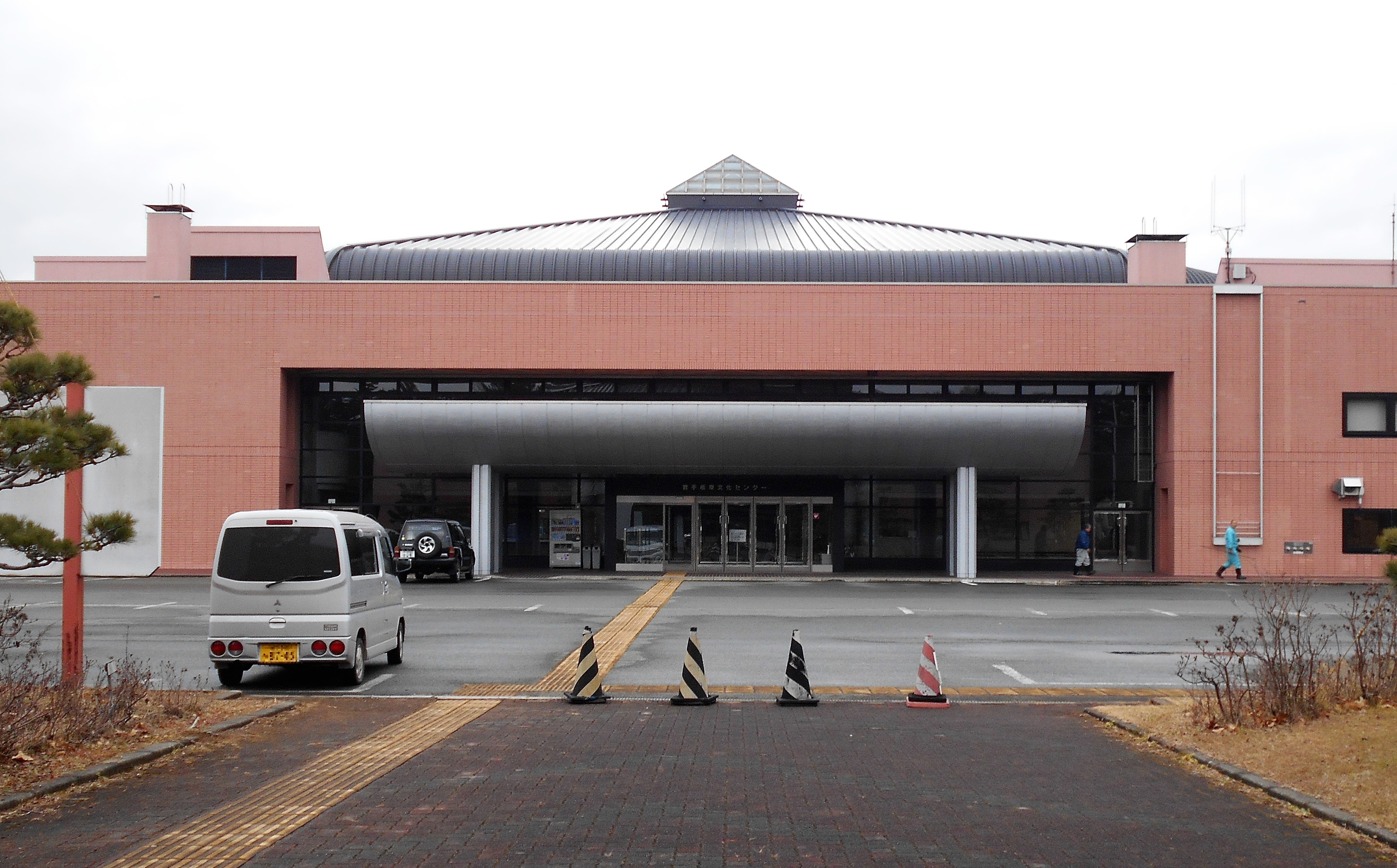
- Iwate Industry Culture and Convention Center, the site of the assault; pictured in November 2016
- Native name: AKB48握手会傷害事件
- Location: 39.8086322°N 141.1320187°E; Iwate Industry Culture and Convention Center, Takizawa, Iwate, Japan
- Date: May 25, 2014; 4:54 p.m. (UTC+09:00)
- Target: AKB48 members
- Attack type: Attempted murder, assault, stabbing
- Weapon: Handsaw
- Deaths: 0
- Injuries: 3
- Victims: Anna Iriyama, Rina Kawaei, 1 staff member
- Assailant: Satoru Umeta
- Motive: Envy

On May 25, 2014, members of the Japanese girl idol group AKB48 were attacked with a handsaw during a fan handshake event at the Iwate Industry Culture and Convention Center in Takizawa, Iwate Prefecture. Two members of AKB48 – 18-year-old Anna Iriyama and 19-year-old Rina Kawaei – along with a staff member who tried to stop the attacker, were seriously injured and taken to hospital. The assailant was arrested, tried and sentenced to six years in jail.

Both AKB48 members underwent surgery and were out of the group's activities for a lengthy period of time. Kawaei was never able to fully mentally recover and in next year's March announced her departure ("graduation") from the group giving her psychological inability to attend fan "handshake" events anymore as the reason.

== Attack ==
At a May 25, 2014, handshake event at the Iwate Industry Culture and Convention Center in Takizawa, Iwate, group members Rina Kawaei and Anna Iriyama were attacked by a 24-year-old man, Satoru Umeta.

The weapon used by Umeta was a foldable handsaw that he had found and taken from his home, modifying it by attaching boxcutter blades on its side. He kept the weapon concealed in a handbag which he carried with himself into the tent booth where the members were located, and drew it out upon entering inside.

A male staff member who tried to stop the attacker was also injured. Iriyama and Kawaei suffered bone fractures and lacerations to their hands: Iriyama's right-hand little finger and Kawaei's right thumb were fractured and cut, Iriyama also suffered cuts to her head. The staff member sustained cuts to his left hand. Umeta was subdued by other staff present at the place, with police arriving and arresting him minutes later. Kawaei, Iriyama, and the staff member were treated at a hospital for fractures and cuts.

== Attacker ==
The assailant was initially arrested for attempted murder, but the charges were later changed by the prosecutor to bodily injury and infringement of weapon regulations arguing how "it couldn't be sufficiently proven he perceived it as an attempt at murder".

He was revealed to be an unemployed man who had no previous interest or fan connection to AKB48. Umeta would later testify at the criminal trial that he was frustrated that such idols were well-paid. Reports by the prefectural police at the time of the incident says he declared that he "felt frustrated after losing his job the previous December", and that for him "anyone was good for killing", saying he eventually opted for an AKB48 handshake event because a large number of people would be gathered in one place. Two different AKB48 CD singles were found during an early house search; Umeta asserted in court he first inspected the venue using the event ticket from one, before he would go on to commit his attack, choosing what booth had the shortest queue to strike faster.

At the trial, Umeta denied injuring the male staff in the November 2014 session, but eventually pleaded guilty to charges of bodily injury and infringement of weapon regulations in December. The prosecutor requested a 7-year prison term, to which Umeta's attorney invoked extenuating circumstances such as his schizophrenia being a factor in the offence, and Umeta having explained and regretted his actions. He was sentenced to six years in prison and was released in 2020.

== Aftermath ==
AKB48 canceled its theater performances through the end of May, and handshake and photo-shoot fan events in May and June were postponed.

In response to security concerns, the Manseibashi Police Station of the Tokyo Metropolitan Police Department asked AKS to conduct security checks of audience members at the theater entrance. Although AKB48's sister groups SKE48, NMB48 and HKT48 did not suspend their theater performances, they introduced security measures: metal detectors, not using the theaters' front rows, suspending post-performance "high-five" events and increasing the number of security guards.

On May 30, AKB48 resumed its television appearances and on June 2 the group resumed theater performances with security measures similar to those of its sister groups. Security and bag checks were added at the general-election-results event and Yuko Oshima's "graduation" concert. On April 8, 2016, AKB48 Group General Manager Minami Takahashi gave her final interview as a member on Kin Sma Special on Tokyo Broadcasting System Television and revealed various insider details about the incident, which she could only disclose then since she would leave the group that very day.

On January 4, 2022, nearly 8 years after the incident, it was announced that Iriyama would be "graduating" from AKB48 after 12 years with the group. She "graduated" from the group on March 17 that year. She is now an actress and YouTuber who is active in Japan and Mexico.

== See also ==
- Stabbing of Mayu Tomita
- Assault of Maho Yamaguchi
- Handshake event
- 2008 Akihabara massacre
