= Handshake event =

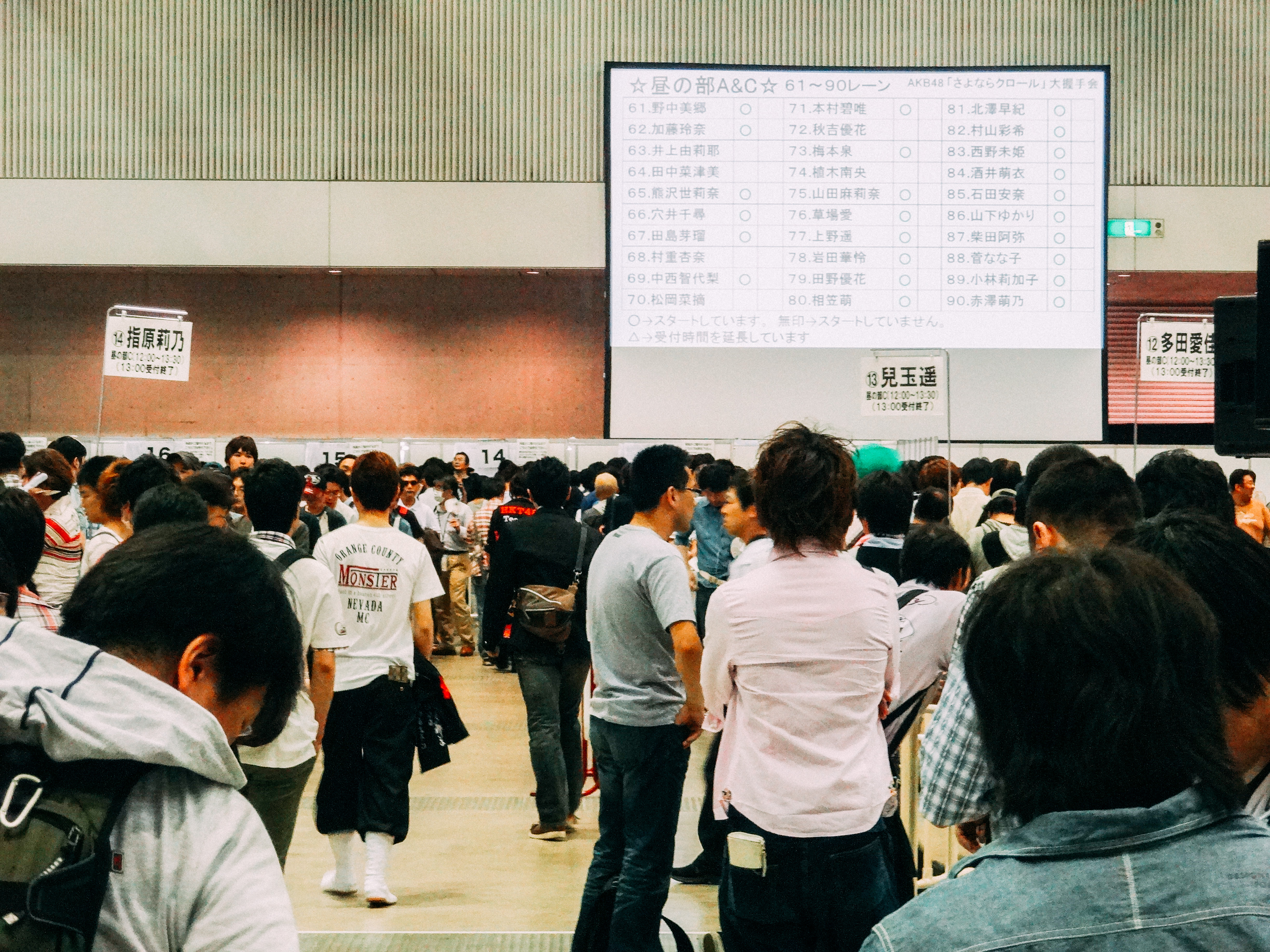
In June 2013, at the Makuhari Messe, a handshake event was held to commemorate the release of AKB48's "Sayonara Craw" where participants lined up to shake hands with each member.

A handshake event (Japanese: Akushukai (あくしゅかい)) is an event where artists or celebrities shake hands with their fans, which is particularly popular in Japan and is a common event held by Japanese idol groups. The handshake events held by the idol group AKB48 are well-known and successful in the entertainment industry and in recent years, Taiwanese and Korean artists have also started to follow this trend. In addition, Japanese bookstores also hold handshake events occasionally, between writers and gravure idols, to promote new works.

== Introduction ==
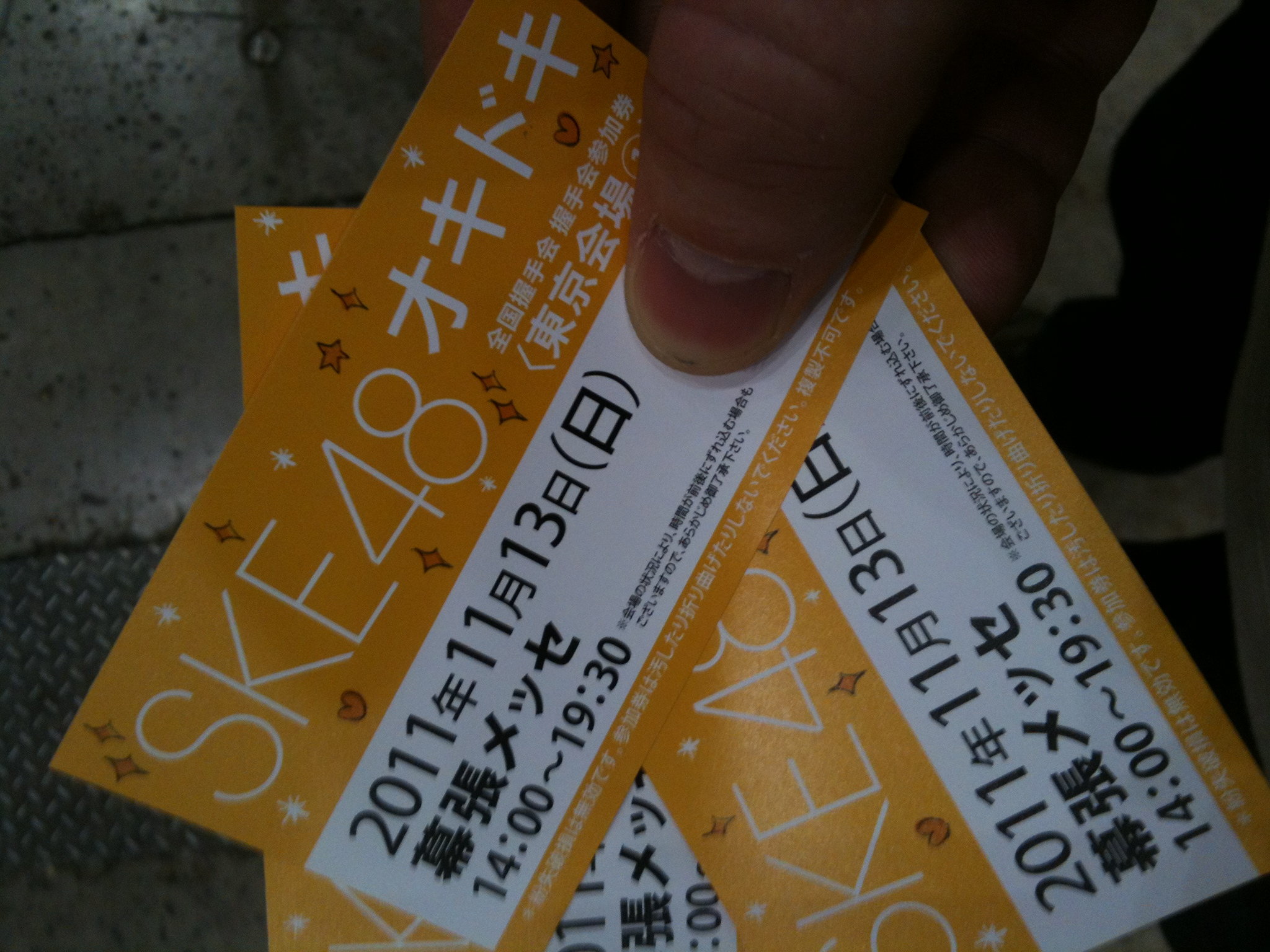
Several tickets to SKE48's National Handshake party at Makuhari Messe

A handshake event is usually seen by record companies as an activity to increase the sales and popularity of their artists' works. Fans can get "tickets" to participate in the event through various channels, such as purchasing records and photo books, attending concerts and theatrical sweepstakes, or online auctions. Participants can redeem their tickets for official admission to the handshake event at a date and time specified by the organizer. During the event, they can shake hands with the artists and also engage in short-term verbal communication with them.

Handshake events usually have a time limit. Taking AKB48's handshake events as an example, the time allocated for each admission ticket is usually a few seconds and participants must leave immediately once their time is up – or they will be removed by the staff. Although each ticket allows only one entry to the event, fans can still get a large number of tickets through repeat purchases, thereby getting more opportunities to interact with the favorite artists.

== Japanese Handshake Club ==
=== AKB48 ===
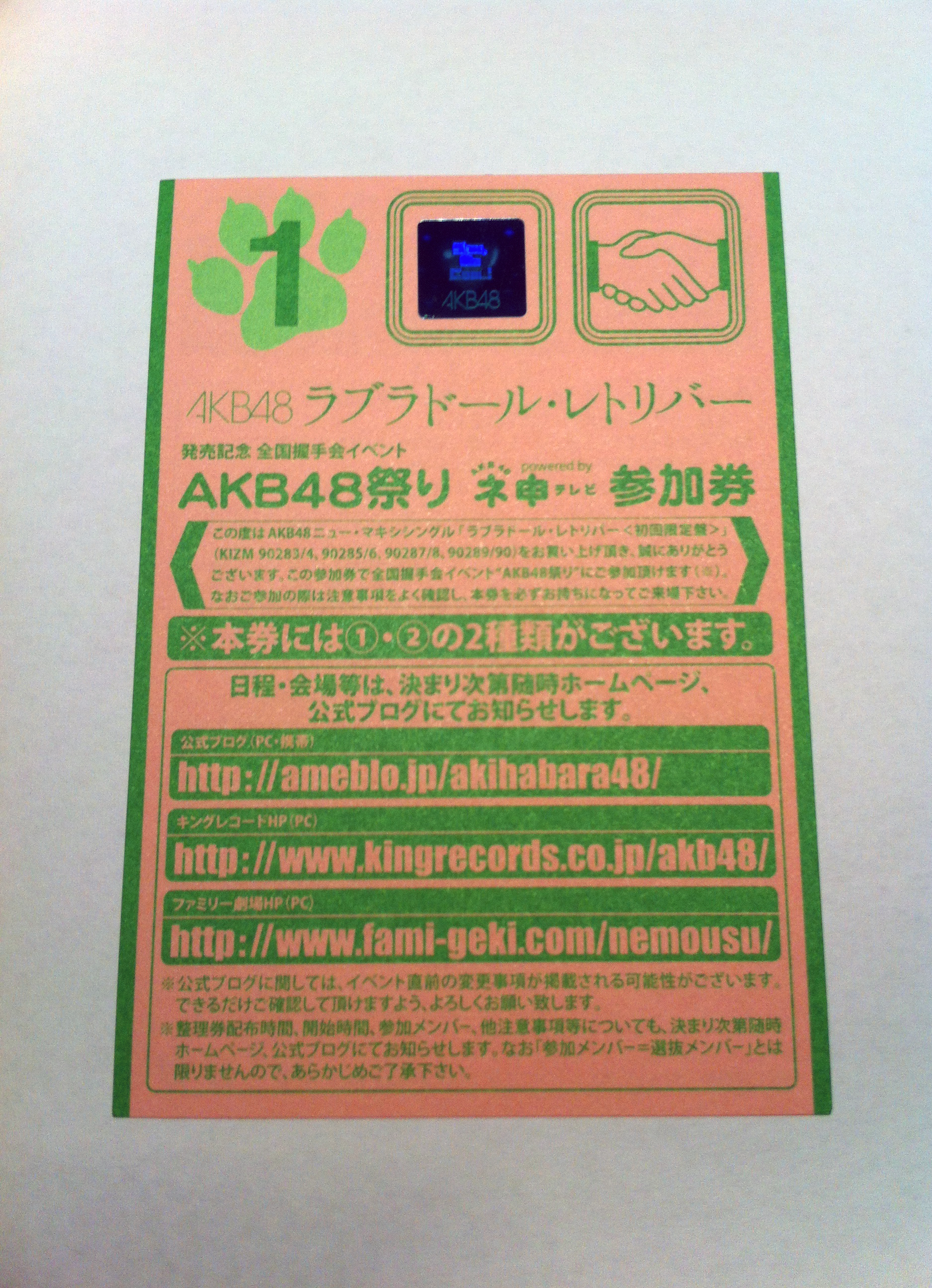
AKB48's 36th single "Labrador Retriever" National Handshake event participation ticket

When AKB48 was founded, it was based on the concept of "being able to meet idols face to face". So in addition to the usual theatrical performances, the group also held a handshake event that gave followers and fans the opportunity to meet and communicate with their in a one-to-one basis.

The first AKB48 handshake event was held on December 16, 2005. Due to problems with the theater stage's equipment, the group's performance could not proceed, so a handshake meeting was started without prior arrangements. Only about 50 spectators participated that day, and the audience was also allowed to take individual photos and group photos with their favorite members – with greater restrictions than nowadays.

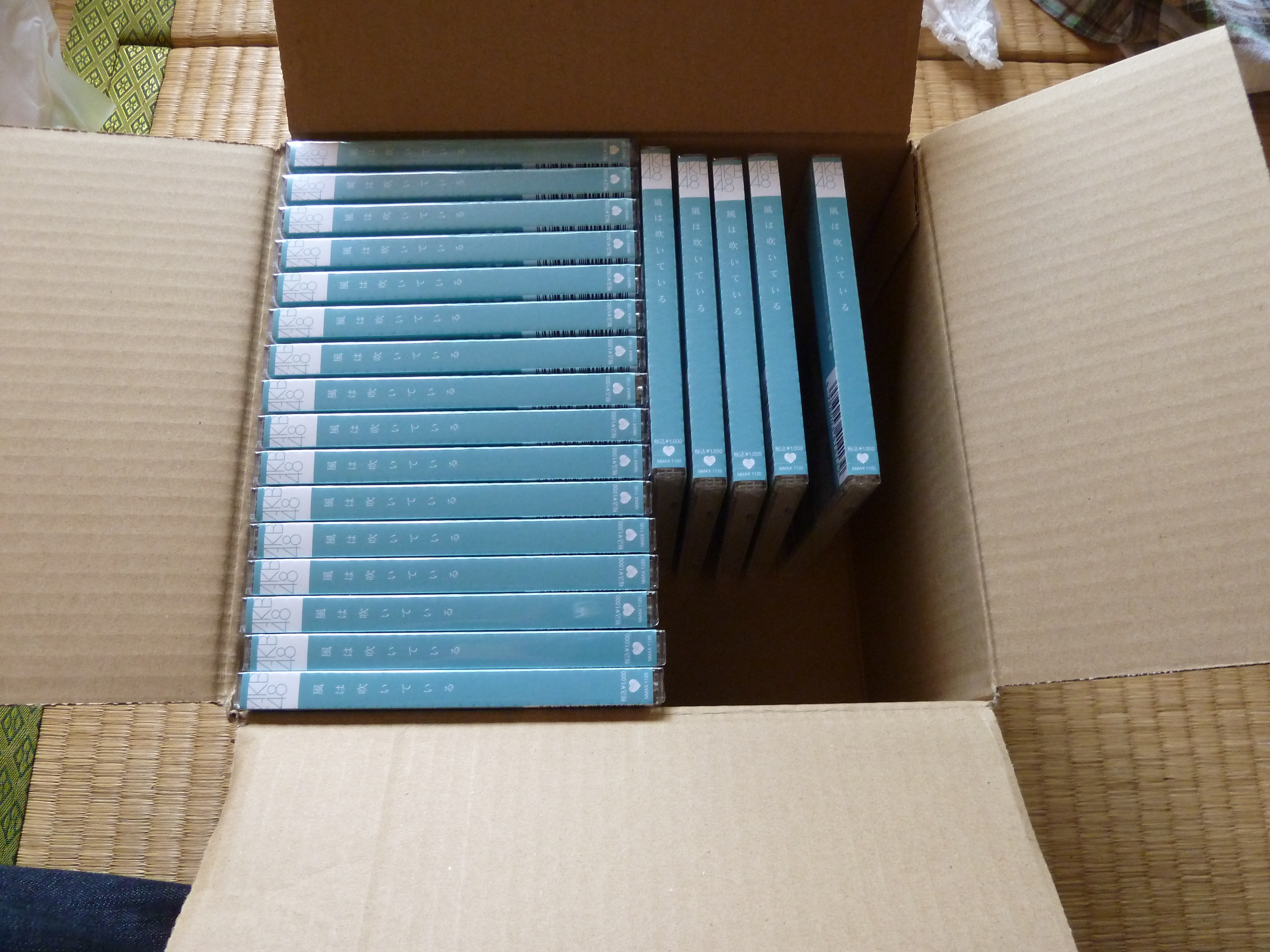
The picture shows the Theater Disk of the AKB48 single "Kaze wa Fuite Iru" and some fans bought the same disk in large quantities to get a ticket to the handshake.

AKB48's handshake events were hosted by the record company King Records after becoming famous. There were two modalities, "National Handshake" and "Individual Handshake", with a strict system in place for participation. The music released by AKB48 is usually sold in several categories, and fans can get the opportunity to enter the National Handshake event by purchasing the Limited Edition version of the record that includes a ticket.

The members participating in the National Handshake are not revealed until a few days before the event, but most of them were members of the "Selection group" that participated in the production of the record. Members will perform small-scale live performances at different venues throughout Japan for a period of time after the release of their single, followed by a handshake event. Fans can redeem tickets for official admission to the event at a date and time specified by the organizer, also getting an assigned seat and a handshake time, then wait in line at different queues during the admission time, and finally enter multiple temporary tents – about 5 meters long – to shake hands with members.

The temporary tents are arranged in different rows, with up to 20 rows when there are a large number of participants. The members shake hands with the participants in their respective tents at the same time, and the number of members in each tent also varies. The handshake time of the National Handshake modality is only 2 to 3 seconds, and the more popular members shake hands with up to thousands of people every day, with up to 10000 participants per event.

In AKB48's "Individual Handshake" (also known as "Big Handshake"), fans need to pre-order the "Theater Disk" version of the upcoming music works on the official website, and select the members to shake hands with by lottery. If they win, they will receive a CD of the Theater Disk version and a ticket for the member to participate, but each person can only buy up to three. Unlike the National Handshake, all members of AKB48 (including new members who have not yet joined the team) will participate in the Individual Handshake, and the day of the event is divided into multiple limited time periods – also known as "sections". The handshake time of Individual Handshakes lasts longer than the National Handshake – usually up to 5 to 10 seconds – and participants can use up to three admission tickets to have intermittent conversations with the members.

AKB48 and its sister groups have also held handshake events overseas. Its members, Yuki Kashiwagi and Rena Kato, once held a handshake event at the Dragon Centre in Hong Kong in February 2014, and the sister group SKE48 also had handshake events for each of its members there, on several occasions.

During an AKB48 handshake event, participants are not allowed to bring mobile phones, video cameras, or sound recording equipment into the venue, they must have their hands checked by staff before shaking hands, and then disinfect them with ethanol and disinfectant wipes. In tightly guarded venues, each person's handbag is checked to ensure the safety and hygiene of the members. Some participants will write a handshake report (握手会レポ) online after the handshake to share their experiences, and fans will also rate the performance of members. Members who are more active and enthusiastic towards fans during the handshake would be referred as having a "godly reception" (神対応), while those who lack smiles and communication will be labeled as "salty reception" (塩対応).

=== Others ===
In addition to AKB48 and its sister groups, many Japanese idol groups also hold handshake events nowadays, such as Morning Musume and Momoiro Clover Z. Both Sexy Zone and SMAP owned by Johnny & Associates held their first handshake party as early as September 8, 1991. SMAP held their debut event at Seibuen Amusement Park to promote its upcoming debut single "Can't Stop!! Loving" and held a handshake event with 10,000 fans present. The male group EXILE's new generation (EXILE TRIBE) also held handshake events in Taipei.

Some artists also hold individual handshake events, such as the idol group Rev. from DVL, Kanna Hashimoto – who once held a separate handshake event at Fukuoka PayPay Dome – and EXILE's lead singer and performer Shokichi, who also held a special public event along with a handshake event in Osaka. Some writers hold handshake and signature meetings at bookstores, while some gravure idols hold handshake meetings at bookstores to promote their photo collections. In addition, the Japan Sumo Association holds handshake events and commemorative photo shoots for sumo wrestlers from time to time. Even male clerks from bookstores have organized handshake events and launched a photo albums, taking photos and signing autographs to customers.

=== Virtual characters ===
At the Niconico Super Meeting 3 Super Volcaloid Appreciation Festival held at Makuhari Messe from April 26 to 27, 2014, a developer used VR reality glasses (Oculus Rift) and a 3D induction handshake device (Novint Falcon) to design an electronic handshake device called "Miku Miku Akushu" and transformed the device into the virtual character "Hatsune Miku" to hold a handshake event, allowing visitors to shake hands with the character in the virtual space. Previously, on April 12, the female protagonist of the animation "Creamy Mami, the Magic Angel", also used the same technology to hold a virtual handshake event at Cinema City in Tachikawa, Tokyo.

== Derivative issues ==
During the AKB48 handshake event held at Makuhari Messe from September 10 to 11, 2011, some participants insulted and made rude gestures at a few members, which led to a discussion about handshake events.

There is also the AKB48 handshake assault that occurred on May 25, 2014, shocking to the Japanese entertainment industry. Multiple artists and groups canceled their handshake events after the incident, including Momoiro Clover Z's sister group Shiritsu Ebisu Chugaku, and the safety issue has received social attention after that. AKB48 later announced that it would strengthen security and add metal detectors in theaters during events to prevent similar incidents.

Furthermore, handshakes events have been known to cause hygiene issues. Due to rumors that some crazy fans shook hands with members at an AKB48 handshake event with their hands stained with bodily fluids, the organizers subsequently forced all participants to disinfect their hands and undergo examinations beforehand.

== Sales impact ==
For AKB48 fans, the more records they purchase, the more opportunities they have to shake hands with AKB48 members. As a result, some fans purchase a large number of records to get more admission tickets. This promotional method has been criticized by some media as the "Handshake Ticket Method" that "squeezes out otaku money". This contrasts with Momoiro Clover Z.

For example, their 11th single "Naite mo Iin Da yo" released in May 2014 did not include a handshake event ticket and sold approximately 67000 copies, a low sales figure compared to singles released during the same period that did include a handshake ticket – such as E-girls' "Diamond Only" (73,000 copies) and Morning Musume's "Toki o Koe Sora o Koe / Password is 0" (119000 copies). However, in March of the same year, the concert held by Momoiro Clover Z at the Japan National Stadium attracted 110,000 fans. Analysis indicates that this phenomenon is due to the consumption habits of Momoiro Clover Z fans, most of whom only listen to the songs on YouTube and then go to the concert to enjoy the scene and atmosphere. By contrast, they are not likely to buy albums without special items, (Note: These are gift items enclosed in the record, such as a handshake ticket or a cover photo.) which shows that handshake tickets have a great impact on album sales.

== See also ==
- 2014 AKB48 handsaw assault
