= Haruka Komiyama =

Female Japanese Idol from AKB48

Haruka Komiyama 込山榛香
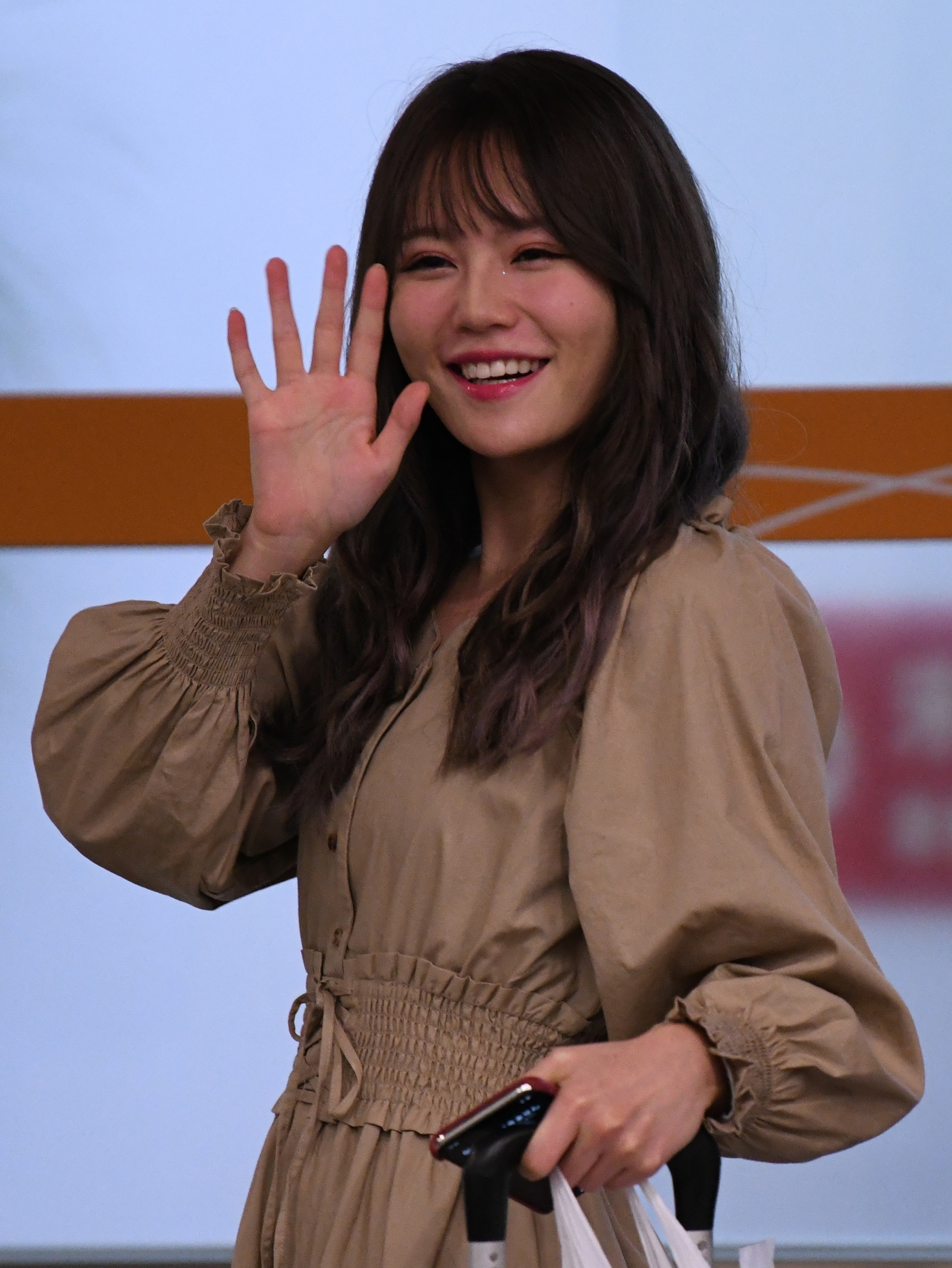
- Haruka Komiyama at Songshan Airport in 2019

Background information
- Born: September 12, 1998 (age 28); Chiba, Japan
- Occupations: Japanese idol; Singer; Model
- Musical career
- Genre: J-pop
- Years active: 2013–present
- Label: King (AKB48)

Haruka Komiyama (込山榛香 Komiyama Haruka, born September 12, 1998) is a Japanese idol, singer and model. She was a member of the Japanese girl group AKB48 and was an exclusive model for the Japanese teen-magazine LOVE Berry.

== Career ==
Komiyama passed AKB48's 15th Generation in 2013. She had her debut in May 2013 and joined the group as a Research Student (研究生 Kenkyuusei) in June 2013. In February 2014 she was promoted as an official member to Team 4 at the AKB48 Daisokaku Matsuri.

Komiyama was announced to have a documentary which first aired March 30, 2016, later airing a more complete version with footage after AKB48's General Elections. After not ranking in the group's 2014 and 2015 General Elections, she ranked at the 21st position in 2016. In October 2016, Komiyama was made an exclusive model for the Japanese teen-magazine LOVE Berry. Her first senbatsu single was High Tension released in November.

In 2017, Komiyama was announced for her second senbatsu Shoot Sign released in March. She was also announced for her third senbatsu single Negaigoto no Mochigusare as a part of the media senbatsu which was released in late May. In her 2nd General Election after ranking the prior year, Komiyama dropped 31 places to 52nd. She was also able to participate in the Kansai Collection in August.

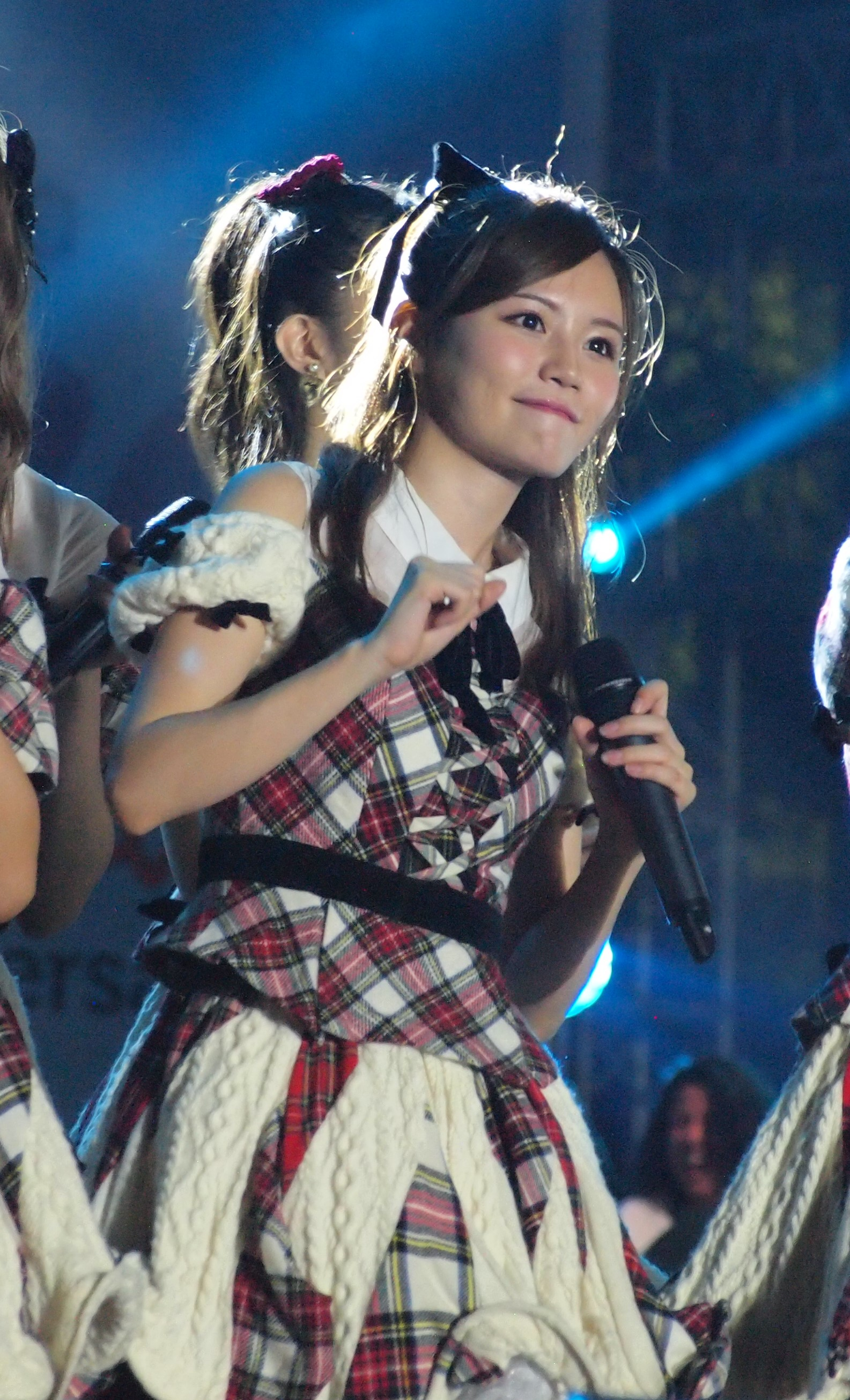
Haruka Komiyama at the JakJapan Matsuri 2018 in Jakarta

Komiyama also participated in AKB48's wrestling event WIP Climax 2017 winning in a duo match with her partner Saya Kawamoto. In November, she was announced with 6 other members to be a part of AKB's new unit "7byou-go, Suki ni naru" (7秒後、君が好きになる。Nana byou-go, Suki ni Naru, After 7 seconds, I will like you) during a Showroom live stream where it was also revealed she was the center for their first song "Hohoemi no Toki."

During AKB48's 12th anniversary performance, it was announced that new teams would be created in the Spring of 2018. She was transferred to Team K from Team 4 and appointed captain.

Participated as a Team K representative in the 3rd AKB48 Group Draft on January 21, 2018.

On January 17, 2018, it was announced on AKB48's official blog that Komiyama was to perform in another AKB48 wrestling event, titled "Tofu Pro Wrestling The REAL 2018 QUEENDOM." The even is to take place on February 23, 2018, and Komiyama will fight as "Shark Komiyama" alongside SKE48's Jurina Matsui (Hollywood Jurina) against SKE48's Akari Suda (Octopus Suda) and NMB48's Miru Shiroma (Dotonbori Shiroma).

During 2018's annual AKB48 Request Hour concert, Komiyama was announced for her fourth senbatsu in AKB48's 51st single, to be released on March 14, 2018.

On April 17, 2018, Komiyama was a Shonichi member for the Makino Anna produced stage "Yabai yo! Tsuite Koren no Ka?!". Started Komiyama Team K "RESET" stage July 6th, 2018.

Ranked 52nd in the 10th annual General Election, maintaining her position from last year.

Komiyama participated in the stage play for the AKB48 drama "Majimuri Gakuen" as a guest on October 22.

On January 14, 2019, Komiyama appeared for the annual coming of age ceremony with other AKB48 members who will, or have turned 20. She had turned 20 the previous year but was unable to participate due to the cut off date April 2nd.

Participated in the stage play "Yama Inu" as a special guest February 27th 2019.

Participated in the stage play "Jinginakitatakai ~ kanojo (on'na)-tachi no shitō-hen ~(仁義なき戦い～彼女(おんな)たちの死闘篇～)" as additional cast.

Joined the LARME auditions in 2020 to become a LARME OFFICIAL GIRL with a one-year contract for first place, she ranked 3rd place and will occasionally model for the magazine. She also modeled for LARME's new adult style magazine PECHE in their first issue. She appears in the September issue and January 2021 issue of LARME, as well as the January 2021 issue of PECHE.

On 30 August, 2024, she announced her graduation from AKB48 after over 11 years. She said that after her role as captain of Team K ended, she had more time to think about her future, and has decided to move on to her next path. Her graduation is scheduled for around February.

== Discography ==
=== Singles with AKB48 ===
Year	No.	Title	Role	Notes
2013	33	"Heart Electric"	Kenkyuusei	Sang with other Research Students on the Theater Edition of the single the song "Kimi no Hitomi wa Planetarium".
2014	35	"Mae Shika Mukanee"	B-Side	Sang with other members on the Theater Edition of the single the song "Koi to ka..."
2014	36	"Labrador Retriever"	Type 4 B-Side	Sang with other members of Team 4 on the Type 4 Edition of the single the song "Heart no Dasshutsu Game".
2014	38	"Kibouteki Refrain"	Type 4 B-Side	Sang with other members of Team 4 on the Type 4 Edition of the single the song "Me wo Aketa Mama no First Kiss".
2015	42	"Kuchibiru ni Be My Baby"	Various B-sides	Sang as a part of the unit 'Next Generation Senbatsu' the song "Kimi wo Kimi wo Kimi wo". Sang on Minami Takahashi's graduation song "Senkaka Kotoba". Sang as a part of Team 4 the song "Nanka, Chotto, kyuu ni...". Sang as a part of the uni 'Mushi Kago' the song "Sakki Made wa Ice Tea".
2016	43	"Kimi wa Melody"	B-side	Sang as a part of the unit 'Next Generation Senbatsu' the song "LALALA Message".
2016	44	"Tsubasa wa Iranai"	Type B B-side	Sang as part of Team 4 the song "Kangaeru Hito".
2016	45	"Love Trip/Shiawase o Wakenasai"	Undergirls B-side	Ranked 21st in the General Election and became a member of the Undergirls for this single. She sang as a part of the Undergirls the song "Densetsu no Sakana".
2016	46	"High Tension"	Senbatsu A-side	First senbatsu single of Komiyama.
2017	47	"Shoot Sign"	A-side and B-side	Sang as a part of the senbatsu for the single the song "Shoot Sign". Sang as a part of the unit 'AKB48 U-19 Senbatsu' the song "Accident Chuu".
2017	48	"Negaigoto no Mochigusare"	A-side and B-side	Sang as part of the senbatsu for the single the song "Negaigoto no Mochigusare". Sang along with other members the Type A Exclusive song "Maebure".
2017	49	"#Sukinanda"	Futuregirls B-side	Ranked 52nd in the General Election and became a member of the Futuregirls for this single. Song title is"Jibuntachi no Koi ni Kagitte"
2017	50	"11gatsu no Anklet"	B-side	Center for the B-side song "Hohoemi no Toki" as part of the new sub-unit "7byou-go, Kimi ga Suki ni naru" (After 7 seconds, I will like you)
2018	51	"Jabaja"	A-side	Sang as part of the senbatsu for the single the title song. Her 4th A-side participation
2018	52	"Teacher Teacher"	A-side and B-side	Sang as part of the senbatsu for the title track, her 5th A-side participation. Also sang in the B-side "Shuuden no Yoru" as a part of Team K.
2018	53	"Sentimental Train"	Futuregirls B-side	Ranked 52nd in the General Election and participated in the Futuregirls song for this single, titled "Are hi Fui ni..."
2018	54	"NO WAY MAN"	B-side	Participated in Ike no Mizu unit, formed from a television show to promote the environment, the song title is "Ike no Mizu wo Nukitai"
2019	55	"Jiwaru Days"	B-side	Participated in the AKB coupling song "Generation Change"
2019	56	"Sustainable"	Various B-side	Participated in the AKB coupling senbatsu "Seishun da Capo" and the Soukantoku & Captain song "Nagareboshi ni Nani wo Negaeba Ii no Darou".
2020	57	"Shitsuren, Arigatou"	B-side	Participated in Minegishi Minami's graduation song "Mata Aeru Hi Made"

=== Albums with AKB48 ===
Tsugi no Ashiato

- Chireba ii no ni...

Koko ga Rhodes da, Koko de Tobe!

- Bokutachi no Ideology
- Namida wa Ato Mawashi

0 to 1 no Aida

- Nakigoto Time

Thumbnail

- Ano Hi no Jibun
- Hibiwareta Kagami

Bokutachi wa, Ano Hi no Yoake wo Shitteiru

- Renai Mukenjigoku

== Appearances ==
=== Units ===
Jankenmin

- Sakasazaka

=== Stage Units ===
AKB48 Kenkyuusei Stage "Pajama Drive"

- Pajama Drive

AKB48 Team 4 Stage "Idol no Yoake"

- Zannen Shoujo

AKB48 Team 4 Stage "Yume wo Shinaseru ni Ikanai"

- Tonari no Banana

AKB48 Special Stage "Minvera yo, Kaze wo Okosen"

- Koppu no Naka no Komorebi

AKB48 Special Stage "Thumbnail"

- Baguette

=== Concert Units ===
AKB48 Group Kenkyuusei Concert ~Oshimen Hayai Mono Gachi~

- Heart Gata Virus

AKB48 8th Anniversary

- Kimi no Hitomi wa Planetarium

AKB48 2013 Kouhaku Uta Gassen

- Akagumi Diamond

AKB48 Request Hour Setlist Best 200 2014

- Candy

Unit Matsuri 2014

- Kimi Dake ni Chu! Chu! Chu!

AKB48 Zenkoku Tour

- Avocado Janeshi
- Suki! Suki! Skip!

AKB48 9th Anniversary

- Baby! Baby! Baby!

AKB48 2014 Kouhaku Uta Gassen

- Sailor Zombie

Kojimatsuri ~Kojima Haruna Kanshasa~

- Kimi no Koto ga Suki Dakara
- Yobisute Fantasy

=== TV Variety ===
- AKBingo! (2014 - )

=== Educational Shows ===
- NHK Koukou Kouza

=== TV Dramas ===
- Kyabasuka Gakuen

=== Web Dramas ===
- Crow's Blood(Brief Cameo as Unidentified Student)
