= Yui Hiwatashi =

Yui Hiwatashi 樋渡結依
- Born: April 30, 2000 (age 26); Saitama Prefecture, Japan
- Genres: J-pop
- Occupation: Japanese idol
- Years active: 2006–present

Yui Hiwatashi (樋渡結依, Hiwatashi Yui; born 30 April 2000 in Saitama Prefecture, Japan) is a Japanese idol and former member of the groups AKB48 and Karat. She is represented by the talent agency AKS.

Multiples of her singles with AKB48 have reached No. 1 on Oricon and Billboard Japan charts, and Sustainable was the number one selling single in Japan in 2019. The album Bokutachi wa, Ano Hi no Yoake o Shitteiru was certified double platinum by the RIAJ.

== Biography ==
Hiwatashi was born on 30 April 2000 in Saitama Prefecture, Japan.

== Career ==
Hiwatashi's first professional works were two "Kids' Challenge English" commercials—in November 2006 and April 2007—for the correspondence education company Benesse. She has appeared in commercials since 2006 for a variety of products from companies such as Lion, Varsan, the Bank of Kyoto, Lotte, Johnson & Johnson (for Band-Aid), Gaitame.com, McDonald's, Fujicco, Mynavi, and Akashi School Uniform Company, as well as commercials for the television anime series Smile PreCure!, DokiDoki! PreCure, and HappinessCharge PreCure!.

Hiwatashi joined the idol group Karat in December 2013, leaving the group seven months later in July 2014. She joined AKB48 in May 2015 as part of the second AKB48 Group Draft. She used the nickname "Hīwatan" (ひーわたん) while a member of AKB48. She announced on 8 November 2019 she was leaving AKB48 Team B, with her final official public appearance being at a graduation performance on 28 November 2019. At that time, she stated she wanted have a career in the television industry.

The March 2016 single, Kimi wa Melody, debuted at No. 1 on the weekly Oricon singles chart. In May 2017, Negaigoto no Mochigusare debuted at No. 1 on both the Oricon and Billboard Japan Hot 100 weekly singles charts. The September 2019, Sustainable, single debuted at No. 1 on both Oricon and Billboard Japan weekly singles charts, and was the best selling single for 2019 in Japan.

The album Bokutachi wa, Ano Hi no Yoake o Shitteiru was No. 1 on both Oricon and Billboard Japan weekly album charts. It was also certified double platinum by the RIAJ.

== Discography ==
=== Singles ===
- "M.T. ni Sasagu" on Kimi wa Melody (with AKB48, March 2016, No. 1 Oricon single)
- "Tsubasa wa Iranai" and "Set Me Free" on Tsubasa wa Iranai with AKB48 (June 2016)
- "Osae Kirenai Shoudō" on High Tension with AKB48 (November 2016)
- "Accident Chū" on Shoot Sign with AKB48 (March 2017)
- "Maebure" on Negaigoto no Mochigusare with AKB48 (May 2017, No. 1 Oricon Single, No. 1 Billboard Hot 100)
- "Tsuki no Kamen" on Sukinanda with AKB48 (August 2017)
- "Hotei Sokudo to Yūetsukan" on 11gatsu no Anklet with AKB48 (November 2017)
- "Position" and "Tomodachi ga Dekita" on Jabaja with AKB48 (March 2018)
- "Atarashii Chime" on Teacher Teacher with AKB48 (May 2018)
- "Seishun da Capo" on Sustainable with AKB48 (September 2019, No. 1 Oricon Single, No. 1 Billboard Hot 100)

=== Albums ===
- Bokutachi wa, Ano Hi no Yoake o Shitteiru with AKB48 (January 2018, No. 1 Oricon, No. 1 Billboard Hot 100, double platinum)
