= Mion Mukaichi =

Japanese singer (born 1998)

- 向井地 美音
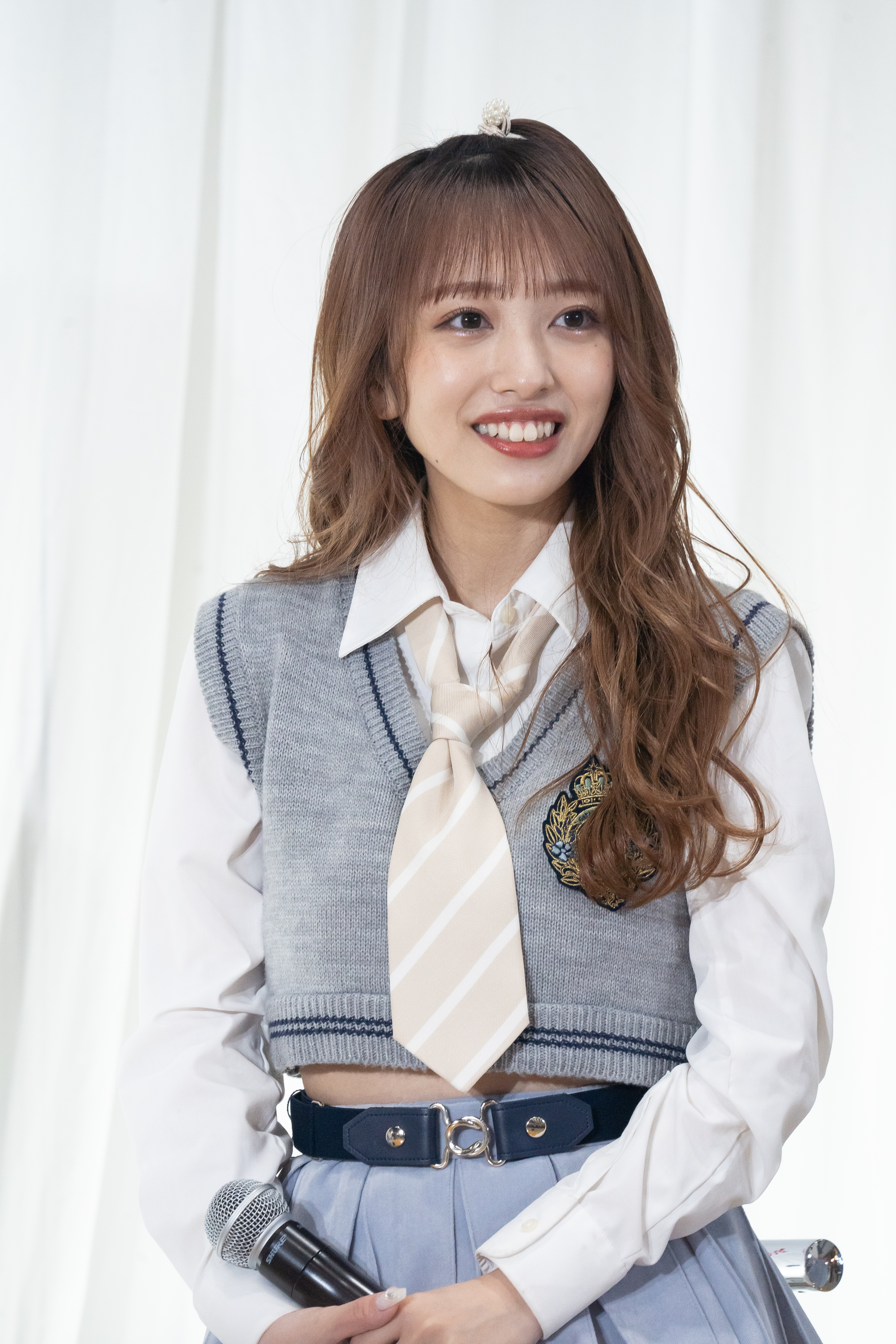
- Mukaichi in 2023
- Born: 29 January 1998 (age 28); Saitama Prefecture, Japan
- Other name: Miion (nickname)
- Occupations: Idol; singer; actress
- Years active: 2002 – present
- Agent(s): Mama&Son
- Notable work: Unfair, Unfair: The Movie, "Tsubasa wa Iranai"
- Musical career
- Genre: J-pop
- Instruments: Vocals; Guitar
- Years active: 2013–2026
- Label: King Records
- Formerly of: AKB48

YouTube information
- Channels: YuuNaaMogiOn Channel; On Channel
- Years active: 2020–present
- Genres: vlogs; comedy; music
- Subscribers: 131,000
- Views: 46,589,490
- Last updated: 13 September 2025

AKB48 Group General Manager
- In office April 1, 2019 – March 16, 2024
- Preceded by: Yui Yokoyama
- Succeeded by: Narumi Kuranoo
- Website: https://onclub.jp/

Mion Mukaichi (向井地 美音, Mukaichi Mion; born 29 January 1998) is a Japanese tarento and former child actress and best known for her affiliation with the idol group AKB48, where she served as the third AKB48 Group General Manager (総監督, sōkantoku) between 2019 and 2024.

== Biography ==
Mukaichi was born in Saitama Prefecture. She played tennis from 1st grade in elementary school right up to 3rd grade in junior high school.

== Career ==
Mukaichi was a child actress represented by talent agency Central G. She quit in fifth grade to concentrate on her studies and returned after entering junior high school, represented by talent agency Ii Concept. Her most prominent acting role was that of Mio Sato in the Unfair series (2006) and its movie adaptation, Unfair: The Movie (2007).

In January 2013, Mukaichi took part and passed the AKB48 15th generation auditions, joining the group as a trainee. She was promoted to Team 4 during the group's Daisokaku Matsuri team assignment event and concert in February 2014. In April 2014, Mukaichi was selected as the new center (lead performer) for the song "Heavy Rotation" after being nominated by original center Yuko Oshima, who was about to leave the group. She joined a title track lineup, or senbatsu, for the first time for the group's 38th single title track "Kibouteki Refrain".

Mukaichi appeared in the series Sailor Zombie, starring fellow AKB48 members Nana Owada, Rina Kawaei, and Juri Takahashi, as a guest role in episode 2. Outside the group, she starred in the movie Unfair: The End, the final part of the Unfair series, which was released in September 2015. Producer Hirotsugu Usui, who did not know Mukaichi joined AKB48, said Mukaichi's role was a very important one and that even if Mukaichi has quit the entertainment industry, he would want her to return for this role.

Mukaichi was appointed as center for the group's 44th single title track "Tsubasa wa Iranai" which was released on June 1, 2016. In AKB48 Group's general elections in the same year, she placed 13th with 47,094 votes and entered the senbatsu in AKB48 45th single.

In June 2018, she placed 13th in that year's elections and revealed that she aimed to become the next general manager of AKB48 Group. In December, during the 13th-anniversary celebration of the group at the AKB48 Theater, current general manager Yui Yokoyama nominated Mukaichi as her successor and stated that she would remain to guide her until she was ready to take over the position. Mukaichi officially assumed the general manager position on April 1, 2019.

On January 21, 2020, to commemorate AKB48's fifteenth anniversary, Mukaichi launched the AKB48 individual YouTube channels project, where members would produce their own YouTube channels to express their individual appeal to the general public, following the cancellation of long-running AKB48 television shows such as AKBingo! and AKB48 Show! Her joint channel with fellow AKB48 members Nana Okada, Yuiri Murayama, and Shinobu Mogi, the YuuNaaMogiOn Channel (ゆうなぁもぎおんチャンネル), was launched the same day.

On December 8, 2021, she was appointed the new captain of Team A during AKB48's 16th Anniversary performance, which she will serve in addition to her role as general manager.

On December 31, 2023, Mukaichi announced that she will be stepping down as general manager on March 16, 2024, and that Narumi Kuranoo will take her place.

On December 12, 2025, Mukaichi announced that she will graduate from AKB48 on 2026.

On April 30, 2026, Mukaichi graduated from AKB48. She resumed her entertainment activities on July of that year following a two-month hiatus.

Mukaichi wrote the lyrics for "Kimi no Doodle" (君のDoodle; lit. 'Your Doodle'), a B-side song on AKB48's 68th single "Suki-ish" performed by the 20th generation trainees.

On October 10, 2026, Mukaichi launched her official fan club, On Club (おんくらぶ).

== Discography ==
=== AKB48 singles ===
Year	No.	Title	Role	Notes
2013	33	"Heart Electric"	B-side	Mukaichi's first single participation. Sang 'Kimi no Hitomi wa Planetarium' together with the trainee members.
2014	35	"Mae Shika Mukanee"	B-side	Sang 'Himitsu no Diary' as part of one-shot unit 'Baby Elephants'.
2014	36	"Labrador Retriever"	B-side	Sang 'Heart no Dasshutsu Game' as part of Team 4.
2014	38	"Kibouteki Refrain"	A-side	Mukaichi's first A-side. Also sang 'Me wo Akete Mama no First Kiss' as part of Team 4.
2015	39	"Green Flash"	B-side	Sang "Haru no Hikari Chikadzuita Natsu" and "Yankee Rock".
2015	40	Bokutachi wa Tatakawanai	A-side	Also sang "Kafka to Dendenmu Chu!"
2015	41	Halloween Night	B-side	Sang "Mizu no Naka no Dendouritsu", "Ippome Ondo", and "Yankee Machine Gun".
2015	42	Kuchibiru ni Be My Baby	B-side	Sang "Kimi wo Kimi wo Kimi wo...", "Madonna no Sentaku", "Senaka Kotoba", and "Oneesan no Hitorigoto"
2016	43	"Kimi wa Melody"	A-side	Marked as the 10th Anniversary Single. Also sang "LALALA Message".
2016	44	"Tsubasa wa Iranai"	A-side, Center	First solo center. Also sang "Aishū no Trumpeter".
2016	45	"Love Trip / Shiawase wo Wakenasai"	A-side	Also sang "Black Flower".
2016	46	"High Tension"	A-side	Also sang on "Happy End".
2017	47	"Shoot Sign"	A-side	Also sang on "Accident Chū" as AKB48 U-19 and "Dare no Koto wo Ichiban Aishiteru?" as Sakamichi AKB.
2017	48	"Negaigoto no Mochigusare"	A-side	Also sang on "Tenmetsu Pheromone"
2017	49	"#sukinanda"	B-side	Sang "Darashinai Aishikata" and "Give Up wa Shinai"
2017	50	"11gatsu no Anklet"	A-side	
2018	51	"Jabaja"	A-side	Also sang on "Position" as AKB48 Wakate Senbatsu, and on "Kokkyo no Nai Jidai" as Sakamichi AKB.
2018	52	"Teacher Teacher"	A-side	Also sang "Romantic Junbichuu" as Team A.
2018	53	"Sentimental Train"	A-side	Placed 13th in the 2018 Senbatsu Sousenkyo. Also sang "Yuri wo Sakaseru ka?".
2018	54	"No Way Man"	A-side	
2019	55	"Jiwaru Days"	A-side	
2019	56	"Sustainable"	A-side	Also sang on "Nagareboshi ni Nani wo Megaeba Ii no Darou".
2020	57	"Shitsuren, Arigatō"	A-side	Also sang on "Mata Aeru Hi Made" and "Aisuru Hito"
2021	58	"Nemohamo Rumor"	A-side	Also sang on "Hanareteitemo"
2022	59	"Motokare Desu"	A-side	Also sang on "Okubyō na Namake Mono
2022	60	"Hisashiburi no Lip Gloss"	A-side	
2023	61	"Dōshitemo Kimi ga Suki da"	A-side	
2023	62	"Idol Nankaja Nakattara"	A-side	
2024	63	"Colorcon Wink"	A-side	
2024	64	"Koi Tsunjatta"	A-side	
2025	65	"Masaka no Confession"	A-side	Also sang on "Sakura no Hanabiratachi 2025"
2025	66	"Oh My Pumpkin!"	A-side	Marked as the 20th Anniversary Single.
2026	67	"Nagori Sakura"	A-side	Last single to participate. Also sang on "Mukaikaze," her graduation song.

== Appearances ==
=== Stage units ===
AKB48 Kenkyusei Stage "Pajama Drive" (パジャマドライブ)

1. "Tenshi no Shippo" (天使のしっぽ)

Team 4 3rd Stage "Idol no Yoake" (アイドルの夜明け)

1. "Zannen Shōjo" (残念少女)

=== TV variety ===
- SMAP X SMAP (2005)
- AKBingo! (2013–2019)
- AKB48 no Anta Dare? (AKB48のあんた、誰?) (2013–2016)
- Ariyoshi AKB Kyowakoku (有吉AKB共和国) (2014–2016)
- AKB Nemousu TV (AKBネ申テレビ) (2014– )
- AKB de Arubaito (AKBでアルバイト) (2014)
- AKB Shirabe (※AKB調べ) (2014–2015)

=== TV dramas ===
- Toshiie and Matsu (利家とまつ) (2002), young Hatsu
- Wedding Planner (ウエディングプランナー) (2002), Yumi's Daughter
- Unfair (2006), Sato Mio
- Iryu (医龍) (2006), Fujiyoshi Juri
- Papa no Namida de Ko wa Sodatsu (パパの涙で子は育つ) (2007), Kawamura Kaya
- Flight Panic (フライトパニック) (2007)
- Hataraki Man (働きマン) (2007)
- Sailor Zombie (セーラーゾンビ) (2014), Giant zombie (Ep 2)
- Majisuka Gakuen 4 (マジすか学園4) (2015), Jisedai (Team Hinabe)
- Majisuka Gakuen 5 (マジすか学園5) (2015), Jisedai (Team Hinabe)
- AKB Horror Night: Adrenaline's Night (AKBホラーナイト アドレナリンの夜) Ep.21 - Big Sister (2015), Ikuko
- Gekijōrei Kara no Shōtaijō (劇場霊からの招待状) Episode 8 (2015) as Mayu Izumi
- AKB Love Night: Love Factory (AKBラブナイト 恋工場) Ep.37 - Dangerous Two-seaters (2016), Mirai
- Crow's Blood (クロウズ ブラッド) (2016), Nami Katayama
- Cabasuka Gakuen (キャバすか学園) (2016), Jisedai (Fugu)
- Tofu Pro-Wrestling (豆腐プロレス) (2017), Mion Mukaichi/Strawberry Mukaichi, Blackberry Mukaichi
- Majimuri Gakuen (マジムリ学園) (2018), Bara/Ikumi Kuwabara

=== Movies ===
- Bayside Shakedown 2 (2003), Rikako
- Unfair: The Movie (2007), Sato Mio
- Gegege no Kitaro: Kitaro and the Millennium Curse (ゲゲゲの鬼太郎 千年呪い歌) (2008), Haruka
- Twilight Syndrome - Dead Go Round (トワイライトシンドローム デッドクルーズ) (2008)
- Unfair: The End (2015), Sato Mio

=== Educational ===
- NHK Koko Koza (NHK高校講座) (2014- )

=== Magazines ===
- Love Berry, Tokuma Shoten 2001-2012 and 2015-, as an exclusive model since December 2015
