= Bokutachi wa, Ano Hi no Yoake o Shitteiru =

Bokutachi wa, Ano Hi no Yoake wo Shitteiru
- Type A cover

Studio album by AKB48
- Released: January 24, 2018
- Genre: J-pop
- Labels: You, Be Cool!; King
- Producer: Yasushi Akimoto

AKB48 chronology
Thumbnail (2017)	Bokutachi wa, Ano Hi no Yoake wo Shitteiru (2018)	Nantettatte AKB48 (2024)

Bokutachi wa, Ano Hi no Yoake wo Shitteiru (Japanese: 僕たちは、あの日の夜明けを知っている) is the sixth studio album by Japanese idol group AKB48. It was released on January 24, 2018. The album features the previously released singles "Shoot Sign", "Negaigoto no Mochigusare", "#Sukinanda" and "11gatsu no Anklet". The album was released in three versions (Type A, Type B and Theater Edition) and Nana Okada was announced as the center for this album.

== Track listing ==
Theater Edition
No.	Title	Performers	Length
1.	"Shoot Sign" (シュートサイン)	Single Senbatsu	4:38
2.	"Dare no Koto o Ichiban Aishiteru?" (誰のことを一番 愛してる?)	Sakamichi AKB	4:24
3.	"Kanashii Uta o Kikitaku Natta" (悲しい歌を聴きたくなった)	Mayu Watanabe, Kashiwagi Yuki	4:32
4.	"Negaigoto no Mochigusare" (願いごとの持ち腐れ)	Single Senbatsu	2:59
5.	"#Sukinanda" (#好きなんだ)	Single Senbatsu	4:28
6.	"Give Up wa Shinai" (ギブアップはしない)	Tofu Pro Wrestling Members	4:51
7.	"Dakitsukōka?" (抱きつこうか?)	16th Generation Research Students	4:53
8.	"11gatsu no Anklet" (11月のアンクレット)	Single Senbatsu	4:23
9.	"Yosōgai no Story" (予想外のストーリー)	Yui Yokoyama, Yuuka Tano, Minami Minegishi, Yuki Kashiwagi, Nana Okada, Akane Takayanagi, Sayaka Yamamoto, Miru Shiroma	4:58
10.	"Namida no Hyōmen Chōryoku" (涙の表面張力)	Mion Mukaichi, Mako Kojima, Juri Takahashi, Nana Okada
11.	"Gomen ne, Suki ni Natchatte..." (ごめんね、好きになっちゃって…)	Satone Kubo, Rin Okabe, Yui Oguri, Narumi Kuranoo, Yuna Obata, Ayaka Samamoto, Hana Matsuoka, Minami Kato, Yumiko Takino

Type A edition
No.	Title	Performers	Length
10.	"Kutsuhimo no Musubikata" (靴紐の結び方)	Album Senbatsu	3:57
11.	"Namida no Hyōmen Chōryoku" (涙の表面張力)	Mion Mukaichi, Mako Kojima, Juri Takahashi, Nana Okada
12.	"Mystery Line"	Yuuka Tano, Jurina Matsui, Miru Shiroma	4:00
13.	"Ren'ai Mugen Jigoku" (恋愛無間地獄)	Haruka Komiyama, Rino Sashihara, Yuka Ogino
14.	"Tengoku no Kakurega" (天国の隠れ家)	Yui Hiwatashi, Saya Kawamoto, Akari Suda, Akari Yoshida, Rika Nakai

Type B edition
No.	Title	Performers	Length
10.	"Kutsuhimo no Musubikata" (靴紐の結び方)	Album Senbatsu	3:57
11.	"Namida no Hyōmen Chōryoku" (涙の表面張力)	Mion Mukaichi, Mako Kojima, Juri Takahashi, Nana Okada
12.	"Kiss Campaign" (キスキャンペーン)	Anna Iriyama, Rena Kato, Sakura Miyawaki
13.	"Kusaimono Darake" (クサイモノだらけ)	Yui Yokoyama, Yuki Kashiwagi, Sayaka Yamamoto	4:11

== Personnel ==
Graduated members

- Mayu Watanabe (on tracks 1, 3–5, 8)
- Haruna Kojima (on track 1)
- Yuria Kizaki (on tracks 1, 4)
- Haruka Shimada (on track 6)

Guests (on track 2)

- Marika Ito (Nogizaka46)
- Asuka Saito (Nogizaka46)
- Minami Hoshino (Nogizaka46)
- Hinako Kitano (Nogizaka46)
- Ranze Terade (Nogizaka46)
- Miona Hori (Nogizaka46)
- Yui Imaizumi (Keyakizaka46)
- Yūka Sugai (Keyakizaka46)
- Yurina Hirate (Keyakizaka46)
- Rika Watanabe (Keyakizaka46)
- Risa Watanabe (Keyakizaka46)
- Neru Nagahama (Keyakizaka46)

== Release history ==
Region	Date	Format	Label
Japan	January 24, 2018	CD; digital download; streaming	King Records (YOU BE COOL division)
Hong Kong, Taiwan	January 24, 2018	CD; digital download; streaming	King Records
South Korea	July 13, 2018	digital download; streaming	Stone Music Entertainment; Genie Music; King
