= Yūka Tano =

Japanese singer & actress (born 1997)

- 田野 優花
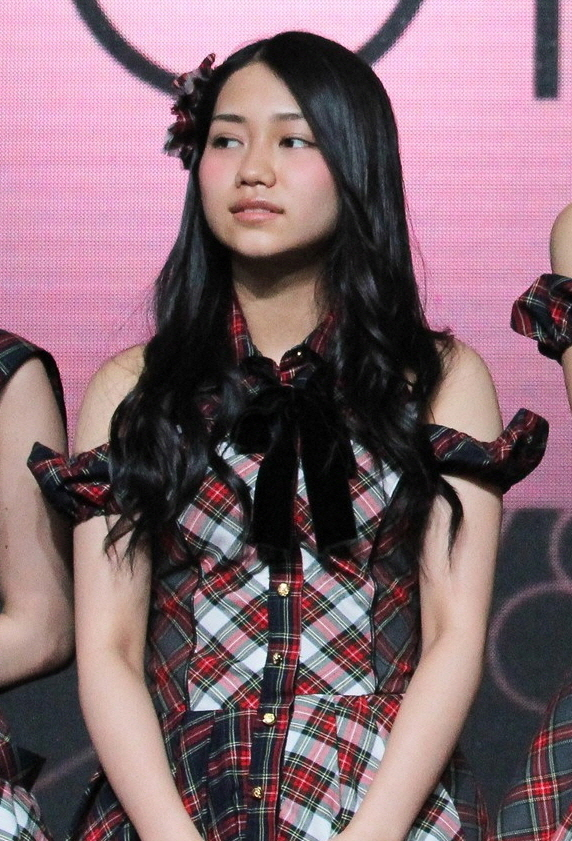
- Tano in 2013
- Born: 7 March 1997 (age 29); Tokyo, Japan
- Occupations: Actress; television personality
- Musical career
- Genre: J-pop
- Instrument: Vocals
- Years active: 2011–2018
- Formerly of: AKB48
- Website: Official profile

Yūka Tano (Japanese: 田野 優花, Hepburn: Tano Yūka; born March 7, 1997 in Tokyo) is a Japanese actress and television personality. She is a former member of the girl group AKB48, in which she served on Team K.

== Career ==
Tano passed the AKB48 12th generation audition for the trainee section in February 2011. On March 24, 2012, at AKB48's concert at Saitama Super Arena, it was announced that she was promoted to full AKB48 members in the new Team 4. She was transferred to Team A after the AKB48 Tokyo Dome Shuffle on August 24, 2012. She placed 7th in rock-paper-scissors tournament on September 18, 2013, and joined the Senbatsu member for the first time in the 34th single released on December 11, 2013.

On February 24, 2014, during the AKB48 Group Daisokaku Matsuri, it was announced that she was transferred to team K. On October 21, 2014, she and Ayaka Umeda were both chosen as Dorothy, the main character of the musical Wiz: The Wizard of Oz directed by Amon Miyamoto. In the elections for the 41st single of AKB48, she placed 47th overall with 18,048 votes and became Next Girls.

She played the supporting role in the musical DNA-SHARAKU which performed in Tokyo, Osaka, and Fukuoka from January to February, 2016. On September 15, 2016, it was revealed that Tano placed 99th overall with 8,636 votes in the 45th single election.

On March 15, 2018, she announced that she will graduate from AKB48, she graduated on May 15, 2018 at her final performance at the AKB48 theater, and her handshake event was held on August 12.

After her graduation from AKB48, she mostly performed in stage musicals, namely THE CIRCUS, a live-action version of the anime W'z and a live-action version of the video game Nobunaga's Ambition. In 2020, she appeared as a character in the Hinatazaka46 drama Dasada. In May 2020, she was supposed to be a cast member of the stage play SAMBA NIGHT 2020, but due to the COVID-19 pandemic, the stage was cancelled. Later that month, it was announced she would be starring alongside Ayana Shinozaki in the YouTube web drama Reiwa 2-nen Online Yomikai Yatte Mita.

== Discography ==
=== Singles with AKB48 ===
Year	No.	Title	Role	Notes
2011	23	"Kaze wa Fuiteiru"	Team 4 Under Girls	"Tsubomitachi"
2012	25	"Give Me Five!"	Special Girls A	"New Ship"
2012	26	"Manatsu no Sounds Good!"	Special Girls	"Mittsu no Namida"
2012	27	"Gingham Check"	Next Girls	"Do Re Mi Fa Onchi"
2012	28	"Uza"	Under Girls	"Tsugi no Season"
2012	28	"Uza"	Team A	"Kodoku na Hoshizora"
2012	29	"Eien Pressure"		"Watashitachi no Reason"
2013	30	"So Long!"	Shinoda Team A	"Ruby"
2013	31	"Sayonara Crawl"	Under Girls	"Bara no Kajitsu"
2013	31	"Sayonara Crawl"	Team A	"Ikirukoto"
2013	32	"Koisuru Fortune Cookie"	Next Girls	"Kondokoso Ecstasy"
2013	33	"Heart Electric"	Team A	"Kiss Made Countdown"
2013	34	"Suzukake no Ki no Michi de "Kimi no Hohoemi o Yume ni Miru" to Itte Shimattara Bokutachi no Kankei wa Dō Kawatte Shimau no ka, Bokunari ni Nannichi ka Kangaeta Ue de no Yaya Kihazukashii Ketsuron no Yō na Mono"	A-side	Won the 2013 rock-paper-scissors tournament.
2014	35	"Mae shika Mukanee"	Baby Elephants	"Himitsu no Diary"
2014	36	"Labrador Retriever"	Team K	"Itoshiki Rival"
2014	37	"Kokoro no Placard"	Next Girls	"Hitonatsu no Hankouki"
2014	38	"Kibouteki Refrain"	Team K	"Hajimete no Drive"
2014	40	"Bokutachi wa Tatakawanai"	Selection 16	"Summer Side"
2015	41	"Halloween Night"	Next Girls	"Mizu no Naka no Dendōritsu"
2015	42	"Kuchibiru ni Be My Baby"	Jisedai Senbatsu	"Kimi o Kimi o Kimi o..."
2015	42	"Kuchibiru ni Be My Baby"	Renacchi Sōsenkyo Senbatsu	"Madonna no Sentaku"
2015	42	"Kuchibiru ni Be My Baby"	Team K	"Onēsan no Hitorigoto"
2016	43	"Kimi wa Melody"	AKB48 Jisedai Senbatsu	"LALALA Message"
2016	44	"Tsubasa wa Iranai"	Team K	"Aishū no Trumpeter"
2016	45	"High Tension"	Renacchies	"Happy End"
2016	45	"High Tension"	Team Vocal	"Mata Anata no Koto o Kangaeteta"
2017	48	"Negaigoto no Mochigusare"		"Tenmetsu Pheromone"
2017	50	"11gatsu no Anklet"	Vocal Senbatsu	"Yosougai no Story"

=== Other singles ===
2014	"Träumerei ni Sayonara

=== Albums with AKB48 ===
1830m

- "Chokkaku Sunshine" (Team 4)
- "Aozora yo Sabishikunai Ka?" (AKB48 + SKE48 + NMB48 + HKT48)

Tsugi no Ashiato

- "Kakushin ga Moterumono" (Team A)

Koko ga Rhodes da, Koko de Tobe!

- "Conveyor" (Team K)
- "Downtown Hotel 100 Goushitsu"

0 to 1 no Aida

- "Ai no Shisha" (Team K)
- "Hajimari no Yuki"

Thumbnail

- "Dakara Kimi ga Sukina no ka"

Bokutachi wa, Ano Hi no Yoake o Shiteiru

- "Mystery Line"

== Stage units ==
Team A 6th Stage "Mokugekisha"

- "Mini Skirt no Yōsei"
- "Itoshisa no Accel"

Team K 6th Stage "Reset"

- "Lemon no Toshigoro"
- "Kokoro no Hashi no Sofa"

Team B 5th Stage "Theater no Megami"

- "Romance Kakurenbo"
- "Hatsukoi Yo Konnichiwa"
- "Arashi no Yoru ni wa"

Team 4 1st Stage "Boku no Taiyō"

- "Itoshisa no Defense"
- "Boku to Juliet to Jet Coaster"
- "Idol Nante Yobanaide"

Yokoyama Team A Waiting

- "Skirt, Hirari"
- "Garasu no I Love You"
- "Ame no Pianist"
- "Dakishimeraretara"
- "Zannen Shōjo"

Team K 7th Stage "Reset"

- "Seifuku Resistance"
- "Kokoro no Hashi no Sofa"
- "Gyakuten Ōji Sama"
- "Kiseki wa Maniawanai"

Shunpūtei Koasa "Eve wa Adam no Rokkotsu"

- "Ame no Pianist"
- "Kuroi Tenshi"

Team K 4th Stage "Saishū Bell ga Naru"

- "Gomenne Jewel"

Special Stage "Kamikyouku Shibari"

- "Escape"

== Appearances ==
=== TV dramas ===
- Majisuka Gakuen 3 (TV Tokyo, 2012)
- So long! Episode 1 (NTV, 2013)
- Majisuka Gakuen 5 (NTV and Hulu, 2015), as Amon
- AKB Horror Night: Adrenaline's Night Ep.10 - Drive (TV Asahi, 2015), as Yukari
- AKB Love Night: Love Factory Ep.28 - Jinx of Ferris Wheel (TV Asahi, 2016), as Tomomi
- Dasada (Nippon TV, 2020), as Matsuko Neruma

=== Web dramas ===
- Crow's Blood (Hulu, 2016), as an infected girl
- Chikai youde Toukutte (Twitter, 2019), as Yuna Yokoi
- Reiwa 2-nen Online Yomikai Yatte Mita (YouTube, 2020)

=== Reading dramas ===
- Hotel Plaza Suite (2019)

=== Films ===
- Linking Love (2017), as Miyu Mashio
- Ginji the Speculator (2022)

=== Documentary shows ===
- AKB48 Ura Story: Tano Yūka 17-sai, Namida no Riyū (TBS, 2014)
- AKB48 Shuen! Miyamoto Amon Musical "Wiz" Kanzen Micchaku SP (NTV, 2015)

=== Commercials ===
- Joysound (2012-)

=== Stages ===
- Traumerei ni Sayonara (2014), as Yurika Ogawa (Leading Role)
- The Wiz (2015), as Dorothy Gale (Leading Role)
- Majisuka Gakuen: Kyōto Keppū Shūgaku Ryokō (2015)
- DNA-SHARAKU (New National Theatre Tokyo, 2016), as Lemon Shirosaki (Supporting Role)
- Majisuka Gakuen: Lost In The SuperMarket (Akasaka ACT Theater, 2016), as Uvall
- You're a Good Man, Charlie Brown (Theatre Creation, 2017), as Sally (Supporting Role)
- The Circus: Episode 1 - The Core (Tokyo, Aichi, Osaka, Fukouka, 2017), as Nadia (Supporting Role)
- TENTH: 10 Year Anniversary of Toho Stage (Tokyo, 2018), as Sally (Supporting Role)
- The Circus: Episode 2 - Separation (Tokyo, Aichi, Osaka, Fukuoka, 2018), as Nadia (Supporting Role)
- Heaven's Record ~Aozora Hen~ (Tokyo, Kobe, 2018) (Supporting Role)
- Dance Cantabile 2018 (Tokyo, 2018), as herself (Supporting Role)
- Singular (Tokyo, 2019), as Heart (Leading Role)
- W'z (Tokyo, 2019), as Hana Mihara (Supporting Role)
- Hoeru (Tokyo, 2019) (Supporting Role)
- Shotou Kyouiku Royal (Osaka, 2019) (Supporting Role)
- The Circus: The Final Episode (Tokyo, Aichi, Osaka, Fukuoka, 2019), as Nadia (Supporting Role)
- Nobunaga's Ambition (Tokyo, 2019)
- LIFE RESET? (Tokyo, 2020)
- Samba Night 2020 (Tokyo, 2020)
- Everybody's Talking About Jamie (Tokyo, Horipro, 2021), as Vicki (Supporting Role)
- Peter Pan (Tokyo, Horipro, 2022), as Tiger Lily (Supporting Role)

=== Music videos ===
- Ohashi Trio S・M・I・L・E・S (2019)

== Awards ==
- The 4th Karaage Grand Prix: Best Karaagenist in Idol Category
