= Kimi wa Melody =

Single by AKB48

- Type-C Limited Cover

Single by AKB48

from the album Thumbnail
- A-side: "Kimi wa Melody"
- B-side: "LALALA Message"; "Shigamitsuita Seishun" (Type A); "Gonna Jump" (Type B); "Make Noise" (Type C); "Max Toki 315go" (Type D); "Mazariau Mono" (Type E); "M.T. ni Sasagu" (Theater)
- Released: March 9, 2016
- Recorded: 2015–16
- Genre: J-pop
- Length: 4:43
- Label: You, Be Cool! / King; Genie Music; Stone Music Entertainment
- Songwriters: Title Track; Lyrics: Yasushi Akimoto; Music: you-me Arrangement: Yuuichi Nonaka
- Producer: Yasushi Akimoto

AKB48 singles chronology
"Kuchibiru ni Be My Baby" (2015)	"Kimi wa Melody" (2016)	"Tsubasa wa Iranai" (2016)

Music videos
- "Kimi wa Melody" (君はメロディー) on YouTube
- "LALALA Message" (LALALAメッセージ) on YouTube
- "Gonna Jump" (Short ver.) on YouTube
- "Shigamitsuita Seishun" (しがみついた青春) Short ver. on YouTube
- "Make noise" (Short ver.) on YouTube
- "Max Toki 315go" (Maxとき315号) Short ver. on YouTube
- "混ざり合うもの" (Mazariau Mono) on YouTube

"Kimi wa Melody" (君はメロディー, Kimi wa Merodī; You Are a Melody) is the 43rd single by the Japanese idol girl group AKB48. It marks the 10th annual anniversary of the group, and was released in Japan on March 9, 2016. It sold 1,133,179 copies on release day, topping the weekly sales of the previous single. This makes it the 30th single to reach 1st place in the Oricon Single Charts, and the 24th single to sell over a million copies in a week.

The main song from this single, Kimi wa Melody has been redone in Bahasa Indonesia by JKT48 in 2017, and in Thai by BNK48 in 2018, and in Filipino by MNL48 in 2019.

== Background ==
The music video of the title song is directed by Mika Ninagawa, who worked previously on "Heavy Rotation", "Sayonara Crawl" and "Sugar Rush". It was first performed live on January 24, on the last day of AKB48 Group Request Hour 2016, and its first TV performance was broadcast on February 22, on NHK's Music Japan. The title track is performed by a group of 21 active members and centered (choreography center) by Sakura Miyawaki.

This single also marked the final appearance of two founding members, Minami Takahashi and Sae Miyazawa. Both of them left the AKB48 Group shortly after this release, after having appeared in the promoting line up of 41 and 33 AKB48 singles, respectively, as well as Karen Iwata.

On July 18, 2016, Brazilian channel PlayTV aired the music video from "Kimi wa Melody" on a J-Pop segmented music video program Interferência Ichiban.

== Artwork ==
Kimi wa Melody was released in five different issues (Type-A, Type-B, Type-C, Type-D, and Type-E) in which each issues have two different artwork for Regular edition and Limited edition. Only Theater version would issued only in one artwork, in total Kimi wa Melody released 11 different artworks. Type-A, Type-B, and Type-E limited version featured all 21 participating members, while Theater version featured all 16 participating members without the graduates. Type-C limited version is Sakura Miyawaki first ever solo cover.

== Track listing ==
=== Type-A ===
CD
No.	Title	Length
1.	"Kimi wa Melody (君はメロディー)"	4:45
2.	"LALALA Message (LALALAメッセージ)"	5:12
3.	"Gonna Jump (SKE48)"	4:59
4.	"Kimi wa Melody (off vocal ver.)"	4:44
5.	"LALALA Message (off vocal ver.)"	5:12
6.	"Gonna Jump (off vocal ver.)"	4:57

DVD
No.	Title	Length
1.	"Kimi wa Melody (君はメロディー)"
2.	"LALALALALALA Message (LALALAメッセージ)"
3.	"Gonna Jump"

=== Type-B ===
CD
No.	Title	Length
1.	"Kimi wa Melody (君はメロディー)"	4:45
2.	"LALALA Message (LALALAメッセージ)"	5:13
3.	"Shigamitsuita Seishun (しがみついた青春) (NMB48)"	4:19
4.	"Kimi wa Melody (off vocal ver.)"	4:44
5.	"LALALA Message (off vocal ver.)"	5:13
6.	"Shigamitsuita Seishun (off vocal ver.)"	4:17

DVD
No.	Title	Length
1.	"Kimi wa Melody (君はメロディー)"
2.	"LALALALALALA Message (LALALAメッセージ)"
3.	"Shigamitsuita Seishun"

=== Type-C ===
CD
No.	Title	Length
1.	"Kimi wa Melody (君はメロディー)"	4:45
2.	"LALALA Message (LALALAメッセージ)"	5:12
3.	"Make noise (HKT48)"	4:27
4.	"Kimi wa Melody (off vocal ver.)"	4:44
5.	"LALALA Message (off vocal ver.)"	5:12
6.	"Make noise (off vocal ver.)"	4:24

DVD
No.	Title	Length
1.	"Kimi wa Melody (君はメロディー)"
2.	"LALALALALALA Message (LALALAメッセージ)"
3.	"Make noise"

=== Type-D ===
CD
No.	Title	Length
1.	"Kimi wa Melody (君はメロディー)"	4:45
2.	"LALALA Message (LALALAメッセージ)"	5:12
3.	"Max Toki 315 Gou (Maxとき315号) (NGT48)"	4:45
4.	"Kimi wa Melody (off vocal ver.)"	4:44
5.	"LALALA Message (off vocal ver.)"	5:12
6.	"Max Toki 315 Gou (off vocal ver.)"	4:43

DVD
No.	Title	Length
1.	"Kimi wa Melody (君はメロディー)"
2.	"LALALALALALA Message (LALALAメッセージ)"
3.	"Max Toki 315 Gou"

=== Type-E ===
CD
No.	Title	Length
1.	"Kimi wa Melody (君はメロディー)"	4:45
2.	"LALALA Message (LALALAメッセージ)"	5:12
3.	"Mazariau Mono (混ざり合うもの) (NogizakaAKB)"	4:58
4.	"Kimi wa Melody (off vocal ver.)"	4:44
5.	"LALALA Message (off vocal ver.)"	5:12
6.	"Mazariau Mono (off vocal ver.)"	4:56

DVD
No.	Title	Length
1.	"Kimi wa Melody (君はメロディー)"
2.	"LALALALALALA Message (LALALAメッセージ)"
3.	"Mazariau Mono"

=== Theater Edition ===
CD
No.	Title	Length
1.	"Kimi wa Melody (君はメロディー)"
2.	"LALALA Message (LALALAメッセージ)"
3.	"M.T. ni Sasagu (M.T.に捧ぐ) (Team A)"
4.	"Kimi wa Melody (off vocal ver.)"
5.	"LALALA Message (off vocal ver.)"
6.	"M.T. ni Sasagu (off vocal ver.)"

== Personnel ==
=== "Kimi wa Melody" ===
The lineup for the A-side single performed by senbatsu of 21 members including 4 graduates, the first time since "Flying Get" back in 2011. The center for this song is Sakura Miyawaki.

- AKB48: Anna Iriyama, Haruna Kojima, Haruka Shimazaki, Minami Takahashi, Yui Yokoyama, Minami Minegishi, Mion Mukaichi, Yuki Kashiwagi, Rena Katō, Yuria Kizaki, Mayu Watanabe
- SKE48 : Jurina Matsui
- NMB48 : Sayaka Yamamoto
- HKT48 : Rino Sashihara, Sakura Miyawaki (Center)
- NGT48 : Rie Kitahara
- SNH48 : Sae Miyazawa
- Graduated members: Atsuko Maeda, Yūko Ōshima, Mariko Shinoda, Tomomi Itano

=== "LALALA Message" ===
Performed by selection "Next Generation Senbatsu", consisting of:

- AKB48 Team A: Anna Iriyama, Nana Owada, Megu Taniguchi
- AKB48 Team K: Yūka Tano, Mion Mukaichi (Center), Tomu Muto
- AKB48 Team B: Ryōka Ōshima, Rena Katō, Yuria Kizaki, Moe Goto
- AKB48 Team 4: Nana Okada, Saya Kawamoto, Mako Kojima, Haruka Komiyama, Juri Takahashi, Yuiri Murayama

=== "Gonna Jump" ===
Performed by selection senbatsu members of SKE48, consisting of:

- SKE48 Team S: Rion Azuma, Masana Ōya, Ryoha Kitagawa, Jurina Matsui
- SKE48 Team KII: Yuna Ego, Mina Ōba, Sarina Sōda, Akane Takayanagi, Nao Furuhata
- SKE48 Team E: Kanon Kimoto, Haruka Kumazaki, Rara Goto (Center), Aya Shibata, Maya Sugawara, Akari Suda, Marika Tani

=== "Shigamitsuita Seishun" ===
Performed by selection senbatsu members of NMB48, consisting of:

- NMB48 Team N: Yuuri Ōta, Yuuka Kato, Kei Jonishi, Ririka Sutō, Sayaka Yamamoto (Center), Akari Yoshida
- NMB48 Team M: Azusa Uemura, Miru Shiroma, Airi Tanigawa, Reina Fujie, Sae Murase, Fuuko Yagura
- NMB48 Team BII: Konomi Kusaka, Nagisa Shibuya, Shu Yabushita, Miyuki Watanabe

=== "Make Noise" ===
Performed by selection senbatsu members of HKT48, consisting of:

- HKT48 Team H: Chihiro Anai, Mashiro Ui, Yui Kōjina, Haruka Kodama, Riko Sakaguchi, Rino Sashihara (Center), Meru Tashima, Miku Tanaka, Natsumi Matsuoka, Nako Yabuki
- HKT48 Team KIV: Aika Ōta, Serina Kumazawa, Mio Tomonaga, Sakura Miyawaki, Aoi Motomura, Madoka Moriyasu

=== "Max Toki 315go" ===
Performed by NGT48, consisting of:

- NGT48 Team NIII: Yuka Ogino, Tsugumi Oguma, Minami Katō, Rie Kitahara, Anju Satō, Riko Sugahara, Moeka Takakura (Center), Ayaka Tano, Rika Nakai, Marina Nishigata, Rena Hasegawa, Hinata Honma, Fūka Murakumo, Maho Yamaguchi, Noe Yamada
- NGT48 Kenkyūsei: Yuria Ōtaki, Yuria Kado, Aina Kusakabe, Reina Seiji, Mau Takahashi, Ayuka Nakamura, Miharu Nara, Nanako Nishimura, Ayaka Mizusawa, Aya Miyajima

=== "Mazariau Mono" ===
Performed by selection members of AKB48 and Nogizaka46, consisting of:

- AKB48 : Anna Iriyama, Haruna Kojima (Center), Haruka Shimazaki, Nana Owada, Yui Yokoyama, Yuki Kashiwagi, Rena Kato
- SKE48 : Jurina Matsui
- HKT48 : Rino Sashihara, Sakura Miyawaki
- Nogizaka46: Erika Ikuta, Reika Sakurai, Mai Shiraishi, Nanase Nishino, Mai Fukagawa, Sayuri Matsumura

=== "M.T. ni Sasagu" ===
AKB Team A's song (excluding Minami Takahashi). Yui Yokoyama serve as center for this song. It is also a name from current stage from Team A.

- AKB48 Team A: Anna Iriyama, Karen Iwata (Last Single), Shizuka Ōya, Nana Owada, Mayu Ogasawara, Natsuki Kojima, Haruna Kojima, Yukari Sasaki, Haruka Shimazaki, Miru Shiroma, Kayoko Takita, Megu Taniguchi, Chiyori Nakanishi, Mariko Nakamura, Rena Nishiyama, Rina Hirata, Yui Hiwatashi, Ami Maeda, Miho Miyazaki, Sakura Miyawaki, Yui Yokoyama

== Charts ==
Chart (2016)	Peak position
Japan (Oricon Weekly Singles Chart)	1
Japan (Billboard Japan Hot 100)	1

== Release history ==
Region	Date	Format	Label
Japan	March 9, 2016	CD; digital download; streaming	King Records (YOU BE COOL division)
Hong Kong, Taiwan	March 9, 2016	CD; digital download; streaming	King Records
South Korea	October 26, 2018	digital download; streaming	Stone Music Entertainment; Genie Music; King

== Ikaw ang Melody (JKT48 Ver.) ==
"Ikaw ang Melody"

Single by JKT48

from the album Thumbnail
- A-side: "Ikaw ang Melody"
- B-side: "Kita Pernah Di Sini, Sebahagian Besar Kenangan"
- Released: December 16, 2017
- Genre: Indo-Pop; J-pop
- Length: 31:48
- Label: HITS Records
- Producers: Yasushi Akimoto; Yasunari Okada

JKT48 singles chronology
"365 Araw ng Eroplanong Papel" (2017)	"Ikaw ang Melody" (2017)	"Everyday, Kachuusha / UZA" (2018)

Music video
- "Dirimu Melody" on YouTube

Ikaw ang Melody is the 18th single from the idol group JKT48 which was released in Indonesia on December 16, 2017 (for Music Cards, coinciding with the day before the 6th anniversary of JKT48 and Sonia Natalia's 20th) and January 12, 2018 (for CD and DVD, also available via Spotify and iTunes) by Hits Records and JKT48 Project, also distributed by Universal Music Indonesia and Sony Music Entertainment Indonesia. Previously, this single was released on CD and DVD planned for December 23, 2017 (to coincide with Team J's 5th birthday, as well as the celebration of JKT48's 6th anniversary concert at Bigbang Jakarta 2017 at JIExpo Kemayoran, Central Jakarta, DKI Jakarta, Indonesia), but was canceled due to technical problems. This single was recycled from the 43rd single from AKB48.

This single is a keepsake single as a sign of farewell to Melody, who was declared graduated from JKT48 on March 31, 2018.

=== Tracklisting ===
- **Bold** indicates centers.

No.	Title	Performers	Length
1.	"Ikaw ang Melody ("You Are the Melody")"	Team J : Devi Kinal Putri, Gabriela Margareth Warouw, Michelle Christo Kusnadi, Shania Junianatha, Thalia Ivanka Elizabeth, Viviyona Apriani Team KIII : Ayana Shahab, Beby Chaesara Anadila, Cindy Yuvia, Frieska Anastasia Laksani, Sonia Natalia, Shani Indira Natio, Shania Gracia Team T : Adhisty Zara, Made Devi Ranita Ningtara, **Melody Nurramdhani Laksani**	4:48
2.	"Kita Pernah Di Sini (We Ever in Here)"	Team J: Della Delila, Devi Kinal Putri, Dwi Putri Bonita, Feni Fitriyanti, Gabriela Margareth Warouw, Michelle Christo Kusnadi, Priscillia Sari Dewi, Riskha Fairunissa, Saktia Oktapyani, Shania Junianatha, Sinka Juliani, Syahfira Angela Nurhaliza, Thalia Ivanka Elizabeth, Viviyona Apriani, Zahra Yuriva Dermawan Team KIII: Alicia Chanzia, Aninditha Rahma Cahyadi, Ayana Shahab, Beby Chaesara Anadila, Cindy Yuvia, Fakhriyani Shafariyanti, Fransisca Saraswati Puspa Dewi, Frieska Anastasia Laksani, Jennifer Rachel Natasya, Lidya Maulida Djuhandar, Maria Genoveva Natalia Desy Purnamasari Gunawan, Nadila Cindi Wantari, Natalia, Ni Made Ayu Vania Aurellia, Rina Chikano, Rona Anggreani, Shani Indira Natio, Shania Gracia, Shinta Naomi, Sonia Natalia, Stephanie Pricilla Indarto Putri Team T: Adhisty Zara, Adriani Elisabeth, Cindy Hapsari Maharani Pujiantoro Putri, Citra Ayu Pranajaya Wibrado, Elizabeth Gloria Setiawan, Eve Antoinette Ichwan, Fidly Immanda Azzahra, Jinan Safa Safira, Made Devi Ranita Ningtara, Melati Putri Rahel Sesilia, **Melody Nurramdhani Laksani**, Nurhayati, Puti Nadhira Azalia, Ruth Damayanti Sitanggang, Tan Zhi Hui Celine, Violeta Burhan Trainee: Amanda Dwi Arista, Ayu Safira Oktaviani, Dena Siti Rohyati, Diani Amalia Ramadhani, Gabryela Marcelina, Hasyakyla Utami Kusumawardhani, Ratu Vienny Fitrilya, Sania Julia Montolalu	4:09
3.	"Sebahagian Besar Kenangan (Most of The Memories)"	Team J: Shania Junianatha Team T: Melody Nurramdhani Laksani	6:57
4.	"Ikaw ang Melody" (Off Vocal Version)		4:48
5.	"Kita Pernah Di Sini" (Off Vocal Version)		4:09
6.	"Sebahagian Besar Kenangan" (Off Vocal Version)		6:57
Total length:			31:48

== Kimi wa Melody - เธอคือ...เมโลดี้ (BNK48 version) ==
"Kimi wa Melody (เธอคือ...เมโลดี้)"

Single by BNK48

from the album Thumbnail
- A-side: "Kimi wa Melody (เธอคือ...เมโลดี้)"
- B-side: "Tsugi no Season (ฤดูใหม่), Yume e no Route (หมื่นเส้นทาง)"
- Released: September 28, 2018
- Genre: T-Pop; J-pop
- Length: 26:16
- Producer: Yasushi Akimoto

BNK48 singles chronology
"Shonichi" (2018)	"Kimi wa Melody (เธอคือ...เมโลดี้)" (2018)	"BNK Festival" (2018)

Music video
- "Kimi wa Melody (เธอคือ...เมโลดี้)" on YouTube

The Thai idol group BNK48, a sister group of AKB48, covered the song with the same title. It is their Fourth single released on September 28, 2018, and the first single to feature 21 senbatsu members.

=== Tracklisting ===
- **Bold** indicates centers.

No.	Title	Performers	Length
1.	"Kimi wa Melody (เธอคือ...เมโลดี้)("You Are the Melody")"	Team BIII: Cherprang Areekul, Isarapa Thawatpakdee (Tarwaan), Jennis Oprasert, Jiradapa Intajak (Pupe), **Kanteera Wadcharathadsanakul (Noey)**, Kunjiranut Intarasin (Jane), Milin Dokthian (Namneung), Napaphat Worraphuttanon (Jaa), Natruja Chutiwansopon (Kaew), Panisa Srilaloeng (Mind), Patchanan Jiajirachote (Orn), Pimrapat Phadungwatanachok (Mobile), Praewa Suthamphong (Music), Punsikorn Tiyakorn (Pun), Sawitchaya Kajonrungsilp (Satchan), Warattaya Deesomlert (Kaimook); Trainee: Nawaporn Chansuk (Cake), Punyawee Jungcharoen (Aom), Rachaya Tupkunanon (Minmin), Sirikarn Shinnawatsuwan (Phukkhom), Sumitta Duangkaew (Faii)	4:45
2.	"Tsugi no Season (ฤดูใหม่) (The Next Season)"	2nd Generation Trainee: Chanyapuk Numprasop (New), Janista Tansiri (Bamboo), Jidarpha Chamchooy (Panda), Juthamas Khonta (Kheng), Kamonthida Rotthawinithi (View), Khawisara Singplod (Myyu), **Nannaphas Loetnamchoetsakun (Mewnich)**, Natticha Chantaravareelekha (Fond), Nuttakul Pimtongchaikul (Gygee), Paweethida Sakunpiphat (Fifa), Pimnipa Tungsakul (Deenee), Plearnpichaya Komalarajun (Juné), Ratah Chinkrajangkit, Tarisa Preechatangkit (Stang), Warinrat Yolprasong (Niky), Weeraya Zhang (Wee)	4:25
3.	"Yume e no Route (หมื่นเส้นทาง)(Route to your dream)"	Team BIII: Jennis Oprasert, **Jiradapa Intajak (Pupe)**, Korapat Nilprapa (Kate), Kunjiranut Intarasin (Jane), Milin Dokthian (Namneung), Miori Ohkubo, Napaphat Worraphuttanon (Jaa), Panisa Srilaloeng (Mind), Pichayapa Natha (Namsai), Rina Izuta, Sawitchaya Kajonrungsilp (Satchan), Suchaya Saenkhot (Jib), Vathusiri Phuwapunyasiri (Korn), Warattaya Deesomlert (Kaimook); Trainee: Mananya Kaoju (Nink), Rinrada Inthaisong (Piam)	3:58
4.	"Kimi wa Melody (เธอคือ...เมโลดี้)" (Off Vocal Version)		4:45
5.	"Tsugi no Season (ฤดูใหม่)" (Off Vocal Version)		4:25
6.	"Yume e no Route (หมื่นเส้นทาง)" (Off Vocal Version)		3:58
Total length:			26:16

== Dirimu Melody (MNL48 Ver.) ==
"Dirimu Melody"

Single by MNL48

from the album Thumbnail
- A-side: "Dirimu Melody"
- B-side: "Gingham Check, So Long!"
- Released: July 26, 2019
- Genre: P-Pop; J-pop
- Length: 32:53
- Label: Star Music
- Producers: Yasushi Akimoto; Yasunari Okada; Paulo Kurusawa

MNL48 singles chronology
"Indahnya Senyum Manismu dst." (2019)	"Dirimu Melody" (2019)	"River" (2020)

Music video
- "Dirimu Melody" on YouTube

Dirimu Melody (English: You Are the Melody) is the fourth single of the all-girl Filipino idol group, MNL48. It is a cover of AKB48's "Kimi wa Melody". The single was released on July 26, 2019, and the single released for the group's 4th single Election.

=== Tracklisting ===
- **Bold** indicates centers.

No.	Title	Performers	Length
1.	"Dirimu Melody ("You Are the Melody")"	Team MII: Alice Margarita De Leon, Cristine Jan Elaurza, Faith Shanrae Santiago, Francinne Rifol, Maria Jamie Beatrice Alberto, Shekinah Arzaga Team NIV: Abelaine Trinidad, Jemimah Caldejon, **Jhona Alyanah Padillo**, Loulle Angelyn Villaflores Team L: Althea Itona, Ashley Cloud Garcia, Gabrielle Skribikin, Kyla Angelica Marie De Catalina, Marsela Mari Guia, Mary Grace Buenaventura	4:45
2.	"Gingham Check"	Team MII: Erica Maria Macabutas, Princess Labay Team NIV: Alyssa Nicole Garcia, Aubrey Binuya, Aubrey Ysabelle Delos Reyes, **Coleen Trinidad**, Lara Mae Layar, Miho Hoshino, Ruther Marie Lingat, Valerie Joyce Daita Team L: Amanda Isidto, Chelsey Yssacky Bautista, Christine Ann Coloso, Dian Marie Mercado, Kaede Ishiyama, Mariz Iyog	5:27
3.	"So Long!"	same as Dirimu Melody	6:04
4.	"Dirimu Melody" (Off Vocal Version)		4:45
5.	"Gingham Check" (Off Vocal Version)		5:27
6.	"So Long!" (Off Vocal Version)		6:04
Total length:			32:53

== Notes ==
1.Concurrent position with AKB48's Team A.
2.Concurrent position with NGT48's Team N.
3.Concurrent position with AKB48's Team K.
4.Concurrent position with SKE48's Team S.
