= Yui Yokoyama =

Japanese singer, actress, and YouTuber

- 横山 由依
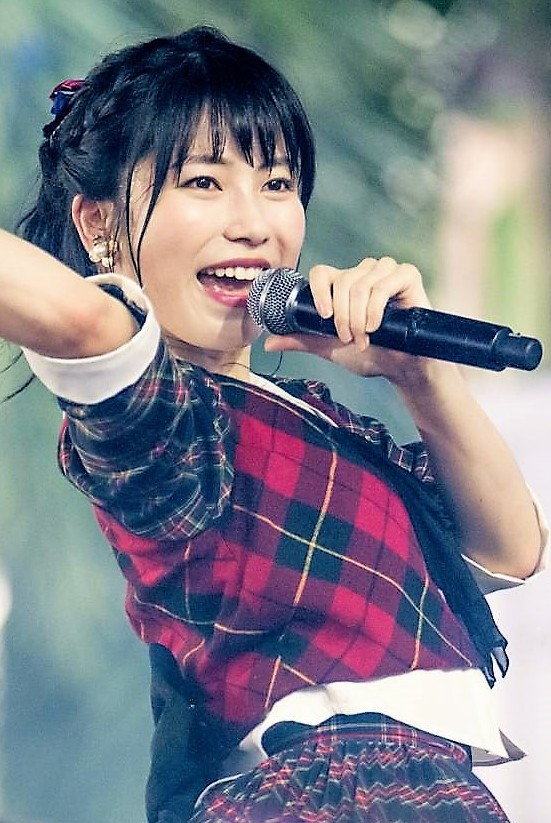
- Yokoyama in the 2018 Japan Expo.
- Born: December 8, 1992 (age 33); Kizugawa, Kyoto, Japan
- Other name: Yuihan (ゆいはん)
- Occupations: Singer; actress; YouTuber
- Agent: Ohta Production
- Spouse: Shota Gogami (m. 2024)
- Children: 1
- Musical career
- Genre: J-pop
- Instruments: Vocals; Drums
- Years active: 2010–2021
- Label: You, Be Cool! / King
- Formerly of: AKB48; NMB48; Not Yet

YouTube information
- Channel: Yuihan Life
- Years active: 2020–present
- Genre: Vlog
- Subscribers: 89,300
- Views: 5,833,998
- Last updated: 2 August 2022
- Website: yokoyama-yui.com

Yui Yokoyama (横山 由依, Yokoyama Yui; born December 8, 1992) is a Japanese actress, YouTuber and former singer. She is a former member of the idol group AKB48. She was the second General Manager of the AKB48 Group. She had served as the captain of AKB48 Team A, and was a former member of AKB48 sister group NMB48. From 2011 to 2015, Yokoyama was also a member of the group Not Yet.

== Biography ==
Yokoyama's first attempt to join AKB48 or a sister group was for SKE48's second generation, but her audition was unsuccessful. She later passed the auditions with AKB48, and became a ninth-generation kenkyusei (trainee) member on September 20, 2009. She was the first of her generation to be promoted, which took place at AKB48 Tokyo Matsuri on October 10, 2010, and where she became a member of Team K.

In 2011, she secured her first participation on an AKB48 single title track by placing 19th in the AKB48 general elections. Her first A-side single was "Everyday, Katyusha".

In 2012, she placed 15th in the AKB48 general elections.

In the AKB48 Tokyo Dome Concert in 2012, it was announced that Yokoyama would join NMB48 and therefore hold a concurrent position between AKB48's Team A and NMB48. In the same year in November, she sang on the A-side for NMB48's sixth single "Kitagawa Kenji".

In 2013, she placed 13th in the AKB48 general election and third in its rock-paper-scissors tournament. On April 28, 2013, NMB48 revoked her concurrency and she remained in AKB48.

On December 8, 2014, it was revealed that Yokoyama would succeed Minami Takahashi's job as the General Director of AKB48 after Takahashi's leaving. With the graduation of Minami Takahashi scheduled on April 8, 2016, she became the second "Soukantoku" on December 8, 2015, during the 10th anniversary stage of AKB48 Theater.

On March 31, 2019, Yokoyama stepped down from the position of General Manager and became a regular member. Mion Mukaichi officially assumed the title the next day. In November 2019, Yokoyama acted in Battles Without Honor and Humanity: On'na-tachi no Shitō-hen, a stage adaptation of the Battles Without Honor and Humanity yakuza film series. She played the role of Shozo Hirono, based on Bunta Sugawara's original portrayal.

On December 16, 2020, Yokoyama's official website, named "YuiFan's", was launched.

On September 12, 2021, Yokoyama announced her graduation from AKB48. Her graduation concert was held on November 27, 2021, at Pacifico Yokohama and her final performance at the AKB48 Theater was held on December 9, 2021.

She enjoys listening to music, she can play the drums and do cartwheels and handstands, and is 158 cm (5 ft 2 in) tall.

== Personal life ==
On December 2, 2024, Yokoyama married actor and Junretsu member Shota Gogami.

On October 26, 2026, she announced the birth of her first child, a daughter.

== Discography ==
=== Singles with AKB48 ===
Year	No.	Title	Role	Notes
2010	16	"Ponytail to Shushu"	Theatre Girls	Sang "Boku no Yell"
2010	19	"Chance no Junban"	Team K	Sang "Alive"
2011	20	"Sakura no Ki ni Narō"	Under Girls	Sang "Gūzen no Jūjiro"
2011	--	"Dareka no Tame ni - What can I do for someone?"	--	charity single
2011	21	"Everyday, Katyusha"	A-side	Sang "Korekara Wonderland" & "Yankee Soul"
2011	22	"Flying Get"	A-side	Also Sang "Yasai Uranai" & "Seishun to Kizukanai Mama"
2011	23	"Kaze wa Fuiteiru"	A-side	
2011	24	"Ue kara Mariko"	Team K	Sang "Noël no Yoru" & "Zero-sum Taiyō"
2012	25	"Give Me Five!"	A-side	Also sang "Hitsujikai no Tabi" as Special Girls B.
2012	26	"Manatsu no Sounds Good!"	A-side	Also sang on "Gugutasu no Sora" & "Kimi no Tame ni Boku wa..."
2012	27	"Gingham Check"	A-side	
2012	28	"Uza"	A-side	Also sang "Kodoku na Hoshizora"
2012	29	"Eien Pressure"	A-side	Also sang "Totteoki Christmas", " HA!" as NMB 48.
2013	30	"So Long!"	A-side	Also sang on "Ruby" as Team A .
2013	31	"Sayonara Crawl"	A-side	Also sang on "Ikiru Koto" as Team A .
2013	32	"Koi Suru Fortune Cookie"	A-side	Ranked 12th in 2013 General Election. Also sang on "Namida no Sei Janai" and "Saigo no Door".
2013	33	"Heart Electric"	A-side	Also sang on "Kisu made Countdown" as Team A.
2013	34	"Suzukake no Ki no Michi de "Kimi no Hohoemi o Yume ni Miru" to Itte Shimattara Bokutachi no Kankei wa Dō Kawatte Shimau no ka, Bokunari ni Nan-nichi ka Kangaeta Ue de no Yaya Kihazukashii Ketsuron no Yō na Mono"	B-side	Sang on "Mosh & Dive" and "Party is over".
2014
2014	35	"Mae shika Mukanee"	A-side	
2014	36	"Labrador Retriever"	A-side	Also sang "Itoshiki Rival" as Team K.
2014	37	"Kokoro no Placard"	A-side	Ranked 13th in 2014 General Election. Also sang "Sailor Zombie" .
2014	38	"Kibōteki Refrain"	A-side	Also sang "Hajimete no Drive" as Team K.
2015
2015	39	"Green Flash"	A-side	Also sang "Majisuka Fight", "Haru no Hikari Chikadzuita Natsu", Hakimono to Kasa no Monogatari.
2015	40	"Bokutachi wa Tatakawanai"	A-side	Also sang "Barebare Bushi" as Wonda Senbatsu & "Kimi no Dai Ni Shō" & "Deai no Hi, Wakare no Hi".
2015	41	Halloween Night	A-side	Ranked 10th in 2015 General Election. Also sang "Ippome Ondo", "Yankee Machine Gun", and "Gunzou".
2015	42	Kuchibiru ni Be My Baby	A-side	Also sang "365 Nichi no Kamihikōki", Senaka Kotoba", and "Yasashii place".
2016	43	"Kimi wa Melody"	A-side	Marked as the 10th Anniversary Single. Also sang "Mazariau Mono" as NogizakaAKB and "M.T ni Sasagu" as Team A.
2016	44	"Tsubasa wa Iranai"	A-side	Also sang "Set me free" as Team A.
2016	45	"LOVE TRIP / Shiawase wo Wakenasai"	A-side	Also sang on "Hikari to Kage no Hibi" which she is Double Center with Sayaka Yamamoto and "Black Flower".
2016	46	"High Tension"	A-side	Also sang on "Better" as 9th Generation.
2017	47	"Shoot Sign"	A-side	
2017	48	"Negaigoto no Mochigusare"	A-side	Also sang on "Anogoro no Gohyaku Yen Dama".
2017	49	"#Sukinanda"	A-side	Ranked 7th in 2017 General Election. Also sang on "Give Up wa Shinai" as Tofu Pro-Wrestling.
2017	50	"11gatsu no Anklet"	A-side	Also sang on "Yosōgai no Story".
2018	51	"Jabaja"	A-side	
2018	52	"Teacher Teacher"	A-side	Also sang on "Kimi wa Boku no Kaze" and "Romantic Junbichuu".
2018	53	"Sentimental Train"	A-side	Ranked 6th on the 2018 AKB48 Senbatsu Sousenkyo. Also sang on "Yuri wo Sakaseru ka?".
2018	54	"No Way Man"	A-side	
2019	55	"Jiwaru Days"	A-side	Also sang on "Hitsuzensei".
2019	56	"Sustainable"	A-side	
2020	57	"Shitsuren, Arigatō"	A-side	Also sang on "Aisuru Hito"
2021	58	"Nemohamo Rumor"	A-side	Also sang on "Hanareteitemo" and "Kimi ga Inaku Naru 12gatsu".

=== Singles with NMB48 ===
Year	No.	Title	Role	Notes
2012	6	"Kitagawa Kenji"	A-side	Also sang "Hoshizora no Caravan" with Shirogumi.
2013	7	"Bokura no Eureka"	B-side	Sang on "Todokekana Soude Todoku Mono" although concurrency as NMB member is removed.

=== Not Yet singles ===
- "Shūmatsu Not Yet"
- "Naminori Kakigōri"
- "Perapera Perao"
- "Suika Baby"
- "Hirihiri no Hana"

== Appearances ==
=== TV dramas ===
Title	Year	Role	Ref.
Majisuka Gakuen 2 (マジすか学園2)	2011	Otabe	
Sailor Zombie (セーラーゾンビ)	2014	Yui (Milk Planet idol group member)	
Majisuka Gakuen 4 (マジすか学園4)	2015	Otabe	
Majisuka Gakuen 5 (マジすか学園5)	2015	Otabe	
AKB Horror Night: Adrenaline Night (Ep.41–42, "Remake")	2016	Noriko	
AKB Love Night: Love Factory (Ep.21 – "A Farewell Time")	2016	Miyu	
Crow’s Blood (クロウズブラッド)	2016	Chisa Furugōri	
Cabasuka Gakuen (キャバすか学園)	2016	Otabe (Maguro)	
Tofu Pro-Wrestling (豆腐プロレス)	2017	Yui Yokoyama / Long-Speech Yokoyama	

=== Films ===
Title	Year	Role	Ref.
NMB48 Geinin! The Movie Owarai Seishun Girls!	2013	Herself	
Yume wa Ushi no Oishasan	2014	Narration	
NMB48 Geinin! The Movie Returns Sotsugyō! Owarai Seishun Girls!! Aratanaru Tabidachi	2014	cameo	
10 Things I Want to Do Before I Turn 40: The Movie	2027		

=== Stage plays ===
Title	Year	Role	Ref.
Utsukushiku Aoku (美しく青く)	2019		
Battles Without Honor and Humanity: On'na-tachi no Shitō-hen	2019	Shozo Hirono	
Catch Me If You Can	2022	Brenda Strong	

== Bibliography ==
=== Photobooks ===
- Yuihan (February 5, 2015, Gakken Publishing) ISBN 9784054061583
- AKB48 Yokoyama Yui - Graduation Memorial Book (Riding on Midnight Bus), (November 27, 2021, KOBUNSHA)
