= Sustainable (song) =

- Type A regular edition cover

Single by AKB48
- Released: September 18, 2019
- Genre: J-pop
- Length: 4:24
- Label: King

AKB48 singles chronology
"Jiwaru Days" (2019)	"Sustainable" (2019)	"Shitsuren, Arigatō" (2020)

"Sustainable" (サステナブル, Sasutenaburu) is the 56th single by Japanese idol group AKB48. It was released in Japan by King Records on September 18, 2019, in seven versions. It debuted at number one on the Oricon Singles Chart and Billboard Japan Hot 100, with over 1.6 million copies sold in Japan in its first week, making it the highest weekly sales of the year. It was the best-selling single of 2019 in Japan. The lead performer for the main track is Moeka Yahagi, and this is also her last single as well.

This single is released in four physical different version, Type A, Type B, Type C and Theater Edition.

== Commercial performance ==
"Sustainable" is the 43rd consecutive single by AKB48 to debut at number one. It is AKB48's first single of the Reiwa period and first release in six months.

== Personnel ==
=== "Sustainable" ===
(19 members, Moeka Yahagi center)

- Team A: Mion Mukaichi, Yui Yokoyama
- Team K: Tomu Muto, Moeka Yahagi( Center/Last Single)
- Team B: Yuki Kashiwagi
- Team 4: Nana Okada, Yuiri Murayama
- Team 8: Rin Okabe, Yui Oguri, Narumi Kuranoo, Nagisa Sakaguchi
- SKE48 Team S: Jurina Matsui
- Team E: Akari Suda
- NMB48 Team N: Akari Yoshida
- Team M: Miru Shiroma
- HKT48 Team H: Miku Tanaka
- NGT48 1st Generation: Hinata Homma
- STU48: Chiho Ishida, Yumiko Takino

=== "Sukida Sukida Sukida" ===
- Team 8's song. (16 members, Yui Oguri center)
- Team 8: Hatsuka Utada, Nao Ota, Momoka Onishi, Rin Okabe, Yui Oguri(Center), Erina Oda, Narumi Kuranoo, Yurina Gyoten, Nagisa Sakaguchi, Akari Sato, Nanami Sato, Miu Shitao, Serika Nagano, Yui Yokoyama, Nanase Yoshikawa, Airi Rissen

=== "Seishun Da Capo" ===
- AKB48 Coupling Senbatsu. (16 members, Nanami Asai center)
- Team A: Rena Kato, Kurumi Suzuki, Manaka Taguchi, Erii Chiba, Rei Nishikawa, Ayaka Maeda, Suzuha Yamane
- Team K: Haruka Komiyama
- Team B: Saho Iwatate, Satone Kubo, Yukari Sasaki, Megu Tanniguchi, Yui Hiwatashi, Seina Fukuoka
- Team 4: Nanami Asai(Center), Kaori Inagaki

=== "Monica, Yoake Da" ===
- 48 Group NEXT12. (12 members, Mizuki Yamauchi & Cocona Umeyama centers)
- Team B: Maho Omori
- Team 4; Mizuki Yamauchi(Center)
- SKE48 Team E: Kaho Sato, Oka Suenaga
- NMB48 Team BII: Cocona Umeyama(Center), Ayaka Yamamoto
- HKT48 Team KIV: Hirona Unjo
- Team TII: Hinata Matsumoto
- NGT48 1st Generation: Moeka Takakura
- Kenkyuusei: Saaya Kawagoe
- STU48: Mitsuki Imamura, Hina Iwata

=== "Nagareboshi ni Nani wo Negaeba Ii no Darou" ===
- Soukantoku to Captains. (5 members, Mion Mukaichi center)
- Team A: Mion Mukaichi (Center)
- Team K: Haruka Komiyama
- Team B: Saho Iwatate
- Team 4: Yuiri Murayama
- Team 8: Rin Okabe

== Track listing ==
Type A
No.	Title	Length
1.	"Sustainable" (サステナブル)	4:24
2.	"Sukida Sukida Sukida" (好きだ 好きだ 好きだ) (Team 8)	3:39
3.	"Sustainable" (off vocal version)	4:24
4.	"Sukida Sukida Sukida" (off vocal version)	3:38

Type B
No.	Title	Length
1.	"Sustainable" (サステナブル)	4:24
2.	"Seishun da Capo" (青春 ダ・カーポ) (AKB48 coupling selection)	3:54
3.	"Sustainable" (off vocal version)	4:24
4.	"Seishun da Capo" (off vocal version)	3:54

Type C
No.	Title	Length
1.	"Sustainable" (サステナブル)	4:24
2.	"Monica, Yoake da" (モニカ、夜明けだ) (48 Group NEXT12 unit song)	3:56
3.	"Sustainable" (off vocal version)	4:24
4.	"Monica, Yoake da" (off vocal version)	3:55

Theater edition
No.	Title	Length
1.	"Sustainable" (サステナブル)	4:24
2.	"Nagareboshi ni Nani wo Negaeba Ii no Darou" (流れ星に何を願えばいいのだろう) (Soukantoku to Captains unit song)	3:39
3.	"Sustainable" (off vocal version)	4:24
4.	"Nagareboshi ni Nani wo Negaeba Ii no Darou" (off vocal version)	3:39

== Charts ==
=== Weekly charts ===
Chart (2019)	Peak position
Japan (Japan Hot 100)	1
Japan (Oricon)	1

=== Year-end charts ===
Chart (2019)	Position
Japan (Oricon)	1
