= Shitsuren, Arigatō =

- Type A Limited Edition cover

Single by AKB48
- A-side: "Shitsuren, Arigatō"
- B-side: Mata Aeru Hi Made (Type A); Omoide My Friend (Type B); Jitabata (Type C); Aisuru Hito (Theater Edition)
- Released: March 18, 2020
- Genre: J-pop
- Label: King Records
- Songwriter: Yasushi Akimoto (lyrics)
- Producer: Yasushi Akimoto

AKB48 singles chronology
"Sustainable" (2019)	"Shitsuren, Arigatō" (2020)	"Nemohamo Rumor" (2021)

Music video
- "失恋、ありがとう (Shitsuren, Arigatō" on YouTube "また会える日まで＜峯岸みなみ卒業ソング＞ (Mata Aeru Hi Made)" on YouTube "思い出マイフレンド (Omoide My Friend)" on YouTube "ジタバタ (Jitabata)<AKB48 Team 8>" on YouTube

"Shitsuren, Arigatō" (失恋、ありがとう; "Thank you, for Heartbreak") is the 57th single by Japanese idol group AKB48. It was released in Japan by King Records on March 18, 2020, in four versions. It debuted at number one on the Oricon Singles Chart and Billboard Japan Hot 100, with over 1.4 million copies sold in its first week, making them the first girl group to surpass one million copies in its first week that year. The center for the main track is Mizuki Yamauchi. This single also serves as the last single and senbatsu for long time member Minami Minegishi.

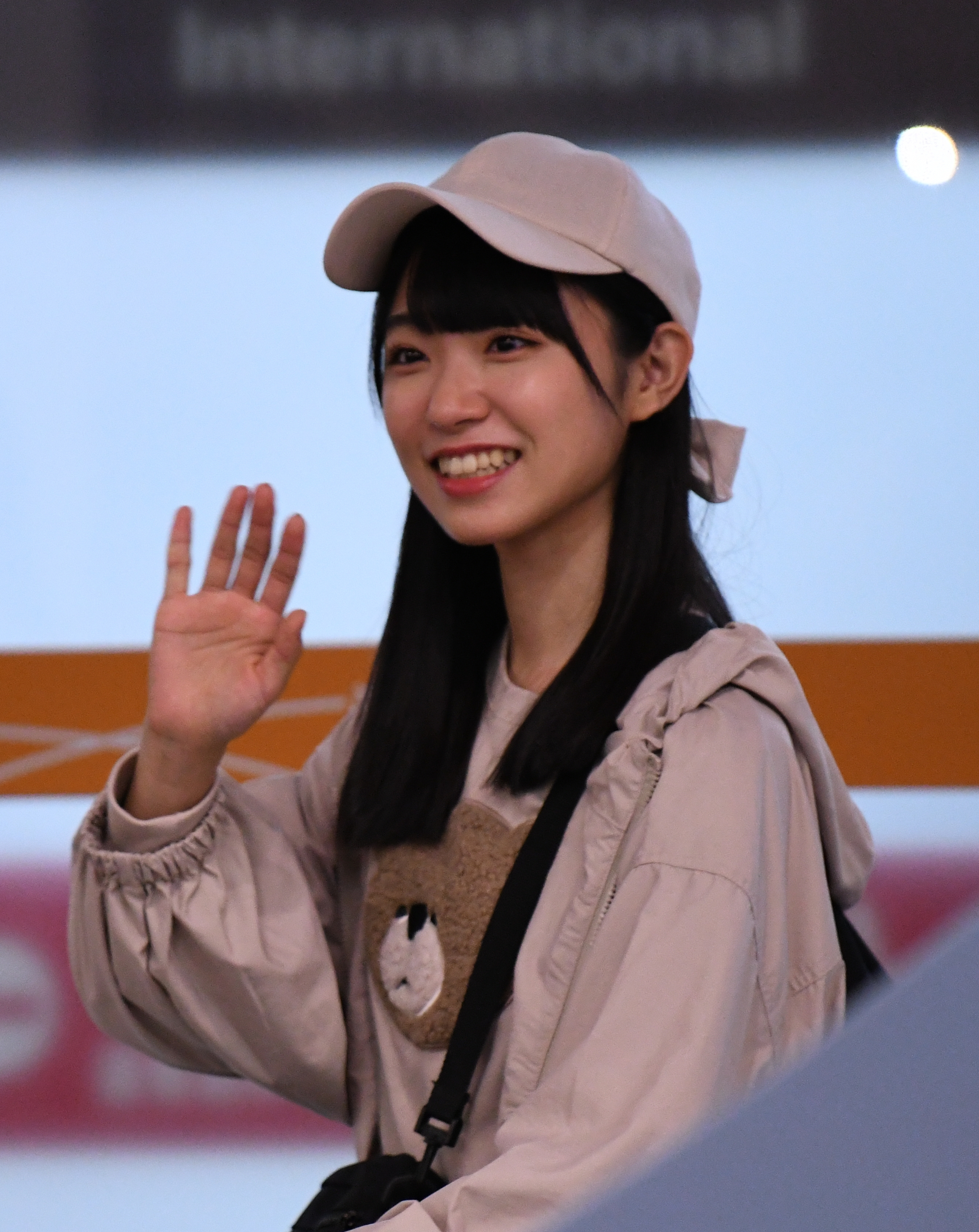
Mizuki Yamauchi, the lead singer for the main track.

== Commercial performance ==
"Shitsuren, Arigatō" is the 44th consecutive single by AKB48 to debut at number one. It is their first and only single of 2020.

== Track listing ==
Type A
No.	Title	Length
1.	"Shitsuren, Arigatō (失恋、ありがとう; Thank you for heartbreak)"	4:37
2.	"Mata Aeru Hi Made (また会える日まで; Until the day we'll be able to meet again) Minami Minegishi graduation song"	4:01
3.	"Shitsuren, Arigatō (off vocal version)"	4:37
4.	"Mata Aeru Hi Made (off vocal version)"	4:01
Total length:		17:16

Type B
No.	Title	Length
1.	"Shitsuren, Arigatō (失恋、ありがとう; Thank you for heartbreak)"	4:37
2.	"Omoide My Friend (思い出マイフレンド; Memories My Friend) (1st Campus)"	4:53
3.	"Shitsuren, Arigatō (off vocal version)"	4:37
4.	"Omoide My Friend (off vocal version)"	4:53
Total length:		19:00

Type C
No.	Title	Length
1.	"Shitsuren, Arigatō (失恋、ありがとう; Thank you for heartbreak)"	4:37
2.	"Jitabata (ジタバタ; Flapping) (Team 8)"	4:36
3.	"Shitsuren, Arigatō (off vocal version)"	4:37
4.	"Jitabata (off vocal version)"	4:36
Total length:		18:26

Theater edition
No.	Title	Length
1.	"Shitsuren, Arigatō (失恋、ありがとう; Thank you for heartbreak)"	4:37
2.	"Aisuru Hito (愛する人; The person I love)"	5:16
3.	"Shitsuren, Arigatō (off vocal version)"	4:37
4.	"Aisuru Hito (off vocal version)"	5:16
Total length:		19:46

=== Shitsuren, Arigatō ===
Performed by Senbatsu, Mizuki Yamauchi Center

- Team A: Mion Mukaichi, Yui Yokoyama
- Team K: Minami Minegishi, Tomu Muto
- Team B: Seina Fukuoka, Yuki Kashiwagi, Satone Kubo
- Team 4: Yuiri Murayama, Nana Okada, Mizuki Yamauchi
- Team 8: Rin Okabe, Yui Oguri
- SKE48 Team E: Akari Suda
- NMB48 Team N: Akari Yoshida
- NMB48 Team M: Miru Shiroma
- HKT48 Team H: Miku Tanaka
- NGT48 1st Generation: Hinata Homma
- STU48 STU: Yumiko Takino

=== Mata Aeru Hi Made ===
Minami Minegishi graduation song, Minami Minegishi center

- Team A: Ayana Shinozaki, Mion Mukaichi
- Team K: Haruka Komiyama, Minami Minegishi, Shinobu Mogi
- Team B: Saho Iwatate, Saki Kitazawa
- Team 4: Nana Okada, Yuiri Murayama

=== Omoide, My Friend ===
Credited as 1st Campus, Maho Omori center

- Team A: Manaka Taguchi, Erii Chiba, Rei Nishikawa
- Team B: Maho Omori
- Team 4: Nanami Asai
- Team 8: Yuka Suzuki
- SKE48 Team E: Haruka Kumazaki, Oka Suenaga
- NMB48 Team BII: Cocona Umeyama, Ayaka Yamamoto
- HKT48 Team KIV: Hirona Unjo
- HKT48 Team TII: Hana Matsuoka
- NGT48 1st Generation: Tsugumi Oguma
- NGT48 Kenkyuusei: Chikana Ando
- STU48 STU: Chiho Ishida, Fu Yabushita

=== Jitabata ===
Team 8 (11 Members) Yui Oguri center

- Team 8: Rin Okabe, Yui Oguri, Momoka Onishi, Erina Oda, Misaki Kawahara, Yurina Gyoten, Narumi Kuranoo, Nagisa Sakaguchi, Miu Shitao, Serika Nagano, Nanase Yoshikawa

=== Aisuru Hito ===
20 members, Nana Okada center

- Team A: Mion Mukaichi, Yui Yokoyama
- Team K: Tomu Muto
- Team B: Maho Omori, Yuki Kashiwagi, Satone Kubo
- Team 4: Nana Okada, Yuiri Murayama, Mizuki Yamauchi
- Team 8: Rin Okabe, Yui Oguri, Narumi Kuranoo, Nagisa Sakaguchi
- SKE48 Team E: Akari Suda
- NMB48 Team N: Akari Yoshida
- NMB48 Team M: Miru Shiroma
- HKT48 Team H: Miku Tanaka
- NGT48 1st Generation: Hinata Homma
- STU48 STU: Chiho Ishida, Yumiko Takino

== Charts ==
Weekly chart performance for "Shitsuren, Arigatō"
Chart (2020)	Peak position
Japan (Japan Hot 100)	1
Japan (Oricon)	1
