= Teacher Teacher (AKB48 song) =

2018 single by AKB48

Single by AKB48
- B-side: "Romantic Junbichuu"; "Shuuden no Yoru"; "Atarashii Chime"; "Neko Allergy"; "Hachinosu Dance"
- Released: May 30, 2018
- Genre: J-pop; Electropop
- Length: 4:29
- Label: You, Be Cool! / King; Genie Music; Stone Music Entertainment
- Songwriter(s): Yasushi Akimoto; Yuto Hinata; Hirotaka Hayakawa; Belex
- Producer(s): Yasushi Akimoto

AKB48 singles chronology
"Jabaja" (2018)	"Teacher Teacher" (2018)	"Sentimental Train" (2018)

"Teacher Teacher"' is the 52nd single by Japanese idol girl group AKB48. It was released in Japan by King Records on May 30, 2018. The single features Yui Oguri as the center performer.

== Background and release ==
On March 19, 2018, it was announced that the 2018 "election single" will be released on May 30 and will feature Yui Oguri in the center position. For the first time the group enlisted a non-Japanese choreographer, Park Jun Hee, who worked with Korean acts such as Shinhwa, PSY and GFriend.

The single was released on May 30, 2018. The song was certified triple million, making AKB48 the first girl group to achieve it and only the third act.

The song has been redone in Bahasa Indonesia by JKT48 in 2018 and included in Joy Kick! Tears album on 2019.

== Promotion ==
The single was first performed on April 1, 2018, for their first solo concert in two years at the Saitama Super Arena. The song was performed as part of the encore of the concert.

== Criticism ==
The song's lyrics by Yasushi Akimoto have been criticized as "justifying sexual harassment in education".

== Commercial performance ==
Teacher Teacher debuted atop the Oricon Singles Chart and atop Billboard Japan's Hot 100.

The single placed atop the Oricon Singles Chart for the month of May 2018 with 1,661,038 physical copies sold in its first day. In June the single fell to number 3 with 153,29 additional copies sold.

On July 12, the RIAJ certified Teacher Teacher as a triple million, making AKB48 the first girl group to achieve it. It's also the only third act behind Kentarō Hayami, Ayumi Shigemori, Himawari Kids and Dango Gasshōdan's "Three Dango Brothers" (1999) and SMAP's "The One and Only Flower in the World" (2003).

Teacher Teacher was the best-selling single of 2018 on Oricon. The song placed at number 10 at Billboard Japan's Hot 100 Year End chart. It also topped the Top Singles Sales Year End chart.

== Track listing ==
Type A
No.	Title	Lyrics	Music	Arrangement	Length
1.	"Teacher Teacher"	Yasushi Akimoto	Hinata Yuto; Hayakawa Hirotaka; Belex	Belex; Hayakawa Hirotaka	4:29
2.	"Kimi wa Boku no Kaze" (君は僕の風)	Akimoto	Toyama Daisuke	APAZZI	3:59
3.	"Romantic Junbichuu" (ロマンティック準備中)	Akimoto	Marutani MANABU	Marutani MANABU	4:40
4.	"Teacher Teacher" (Off Vocal Ver.)		Hinata Yuto; Hayakawa Hirotaka; Belex	Belex; Hayakawa Hirotaka	4:29
5.	"Kimi wa Boku no Kaze" (Off Vocal Ver.)		Toyama Daisuke	APAZZI	3:58
6.	"Romantic Junbichuu" (Off Vocal Ver.)		Marutani MANABU	Marutani MANABU	4:40
Total length:					26:15

Type B
No.	Title	Lyrics	Music	Arrangement	Length
1.	"Teacher Teacher"	Yasushi Akimoto	Hinata Yuto; Hayakawa Hirotaka; Belex	Belex; Hayakawa Hirotaka	4:29
2.	"Kimi wa Boku no Kaze" (君は僕の風)	Akimoto	Toyama Daisuke	APAZZI	3:59
3.	"Shuuden no Yoru" (終電の夜)	Akimoto	Marutani MANABU	Marutani MANABU	4:37
4.	"Teacher Teacher" (Off Vocal Ver.)		Hinata Yuto; Hayakawa Hirotaka; Belex	Belex; Hayakawa Hirotaka	4:29
5.	"Kimi wa Boku no Kaze" (Off Vocal Ver.)		Toyama Daisuke	APAZZI	3:58
6.	"Shuuden no Yoru" (Off Vocal Ver.)		Marutani MANABU	Marutani MANABU	4:36
Total length:					26:08

Type C
No.	Title	Lyrics	Music	Arrangement	Length
1.	"Teacher Teacher"	Yasushi Akimoto	Hinata Yuto; Hayakawa Hirotaka; Belex	Belex; Hayakawa Hirotaka	4:29
2.	"Kimi wa Boku no Kaze" (君は僕の風)	Akimoto	Toyama Daisuke	APAZZI	3:59
3.	"Atarashii Chime" (新しいチャイム)	Akimoto	Yamada Tomokazu	Wakatabe Makoto	4:25
4.	"Teacher Teacher" (Off Vocal Ver.)		Hinata Yuto; Hayakawa Hirotaka; Belex	Belex; Hayakawa Hirotaka	4:29
5.	"Kimi wa Boku no Kaze" (Off Vocal Ver.)		Toyama Daisuke	APAZZI	3:58
6.	"Atarashii Chime" (Off Vocal Ver.)		Yamada Tomokazu	Wakatabe Makoto	4:25
Total length:					25:45

Type D
No.	Title	Lyrics	Music	Arrangement	Length
1.	"Teacher Teacher"	Yasushi Akimoto	Hinata Yuto; Hayakawa Hirotaka; Belex	Belex; Hayakawa Hirotaka	4:29
2.	"Kimi wa Boku no Kaze" (君は僕の風)	Akimoto	Toyama Daisuke	APAZZI	3:59
3.	"Neko Allergy" (猫アレルギー)	Akimoto	Itagaki Yusuke	Itagaki Yusuke	4:49
4.	"Teacher Teacher" (Off Vocal Ver.)		Hinata Yuto; Hayakawa Hirotaka; Belex	Belex; Hayakawa Hirotaka	4:29
5.	"Kimi wa Boku no Kaze" (Off Vocal Ver.)		Toyama Daisuke	APAZZI	3:58
6.	"Neko Allergy" (Off Vocal Ver.)		Itagaki Yusuke	Itagaki Yusuke	4:49
Total length:					26:33

Theater Edition
No.	Title	Lyrics	Music	Arrangement	Length
1.	"Teacher Teacher"	Yasushi Akimoto	Hinata Yuto; Hayakawa Hirotaka; Belex	Belex; Hayakawa Hirotaka	4:29
2.	"Kimi wa Boku no Kaze" (君は僕の風)	Akimoto	Toyama Daisuke	APAZZI	3:59
3.	"Hachinosu Dance" (蜂の巣ダンス)	Akimoto			4:08
4.	"Teacher Teacher" (Off Vocal Ver.)		Hinata Yuto; Hayakawa Hirotaka; Belex	Belex; Hayakawa Hirotaka	4:29
5.	"Kimi wa Boku no Kaze" (Off Vocal Ver.)		Toyama Daisuke	APAZZI	3:58
6.	"Hachinosu Dance" (Off Vocal Ver.)				4:08
Total length:					25:11

Notes

- "Teacher Teacher" is performed by 28 members from Senbatsu
- "Kimi wa Boku no Kaze" is performed by Center Exam Senbatsu
- "Romantic Junbichuu" is performed by Team A
- "Shuuden no Yoru" is performed by Team K
- "Atarashi Chime" is performed by Team B
- "Neko Allergy" is performed by Team 4
- "Hachinosu Dance" is performed by Team 8

== Members ==
=== Teacher Teacher ===
- Team A: Kato Rena, Mion Mukaichi, Yokoyama Yui
- Team K: Mako Kojima, Haruka Komiyama
- Team B: Yuki Kashiwagi, Kubo Satone, Juri Takahashi, Fukuoka Seina
- Team 4: Nana Okada, Murayama Yuiri, Yamauchi Mizuki
- Team 8: Okabe Rin, Yui Oguri
- Team S: Jurina Matsui
- Team KII: Obata Yuna
- Team E: Akari Suda
- Team N: Yamamoto Ayaka, Yamamoto Sayaka
- Team M: Shiroma Miru, Yoshida Akari
- Team H: Sashihara Rino, Nako Yabuki
- Team KIV: Miyawaki Sakura
- Team TII: Matsuoka Hana
- Team NIII: Yuka Ogino, Rika Nakai
- STU48 1st Generation: Yumiko Takino

=== "Kimi wa Boku no Kaze" ===
Center Exam Senbatsu (センター試験選抜メンバー) (16 Members) (Mukaichi Mion Center)

- Team A: Anna Iriyama, Mukaichi Mion, Yokoyama Yui
- Team B: Saho Iwatate, Yuki Kashiwagi, Yukari Sasaki, Fukuoka Seina
- Team 4: Saya Kawamoto
- Team 8: Erina Oda
- Team S: Tsuzuki Rika
- Team KII: Arai Yuki
- Team H: Sakaguchi Riko, Sashihara Rino
- Team KIV: Fuchigami Mai
- Team NIII: Murakumo Fuka
- NGT48 Kenkyuusei: Aina Kusakabe

=== "Romantic Junbichuu" ===
Okabe Team A (岡部チームA) (21 Members) (Yui Oguri Center)

- Team A: Iriyama Anna, Okabe Rin, Okumoto Hinano, Oguri Yui, Kato Rena, Goto Moe, Shitao Miu, Shinozaki Ayana, Shimoaoki Karin, Suzuki Kurumi, Taguchi Manaka, Tanikawa Hijiri, Chiba Erii, Cho Kurena, Nishikawa Rei, Hitomi Kotone, Maeda Ayaka, Miyazaki Miho, Mukaichi Mion, Yokoyama Yui, Yoshida Karen

=== "Shuuden no Yoru" ===
Komiyama Team K (込山チームK) (23 Members) (Narumi Kuranoo Center)

Team K: Ichikawa Manami, Oda Erina, Kuranoo Narumi, Mako Kojima, Haruka Komiyama, Hinana Shimoguchi, Terada Misaki, Nakano Ikumi, Rena Nozawa, Hashimoto Haruna, Harumoto Yuki, Hidaritomo Ayaka, Nana Fujita, Minegishi Minami, Muto Orin, Tomu Muto, Mogi Shinobu, Yaguchi Moka, Yasuda Kana, Yamada Kyoka, Yamada Nanami, Yumoto Ami, Yokoyama Yui

=== "Atarashii Chime" ===
Takahashi Team B (高橋チームB) (24 Members) (Kubo Satone Center)

Team B: Iwatate Saho, Ota Nao, Okuhara Hinako, Oya Shizuka, Kashiwagi Yuki, Kawahara Misaki, Kitazawa Saki, Kubo Satone, Sasaki Yukari, Sato Akari, Sato Shiori, Shimizu Maria, Takahashi Juri, Takita Kayoko, Takeuchi Miyu, Taniguchi Megu, Nakanishi Chiyori, Hattori Yuna, Hiwatashi Yui, Honda Hitomi, Fukuoka Seina, Yamabe Ayu, Yamamoto Ruka, Yoshikawa Nanase

=== "Neko Allergy" ===
Murayama Team 4 (村山チーム4) (24 Members) (Yamauchi Mizuki Center)

Team 4: Asai Nanami, Inagaki Kaori, Utada Hatsuka, Okawa Rio, Onishi Momoka, Omori Miyuu, Okada Nana, Kawamoto Saya, Gyoten Yurina, Sakaguchi Nagisa, Sato Kiara, Takaoka Kaoru, Takahashi Ayane, Takahashi Sayaka, Tatsuya Makiho, Taya Misaki, Nagano Serika, Noda Hinano, Hama Sayuna, Hirano Hikaru, Ma Chia-Ling, Miyazato Rira, Murayama Yuiri, Yamauchi Mizuki

=== "Hachinosu Dance" ===
Team 8 (チーム8) (16 Members) (Yokoyama Yui Center)

Team 8: Ota Nao, Onishi Momoka, Okabe Rin, Oguri Yui, Gyoten Yurina, Kuranoo Narumi, Sakaguchi Nagisa, Sato Shiori, Tanikawa Hijiri, Hama Sayuna, Hidaritomo Ayaka, Hitomi Kotone, Miyazato Rira, Yaguchi Moka, Yamada Nanami, Yokoyama Yui

== Charts ==
=== Weekly charts ===
Chart (2018)	Peak position
Japan (Oricon)	1
Japan (Japan Hot 100)	1

=== Year-end charts ===
Chart (2018)	Peak position
Japan (Oricon)	1
Japan (Japan Hot 100)	10

== Certifications ==
Country	Provider	Certifications
Japan	RIAJ	3× Million

== Release history ==
Region	Date	Format	Label
Japan	May 30, 2018	CD; digital download; streaming	King Records (YOU BE COOL division)
Hong Kong, Taiwan	May 30, 2018	CD; digital download; streaming	King Records
South Korea	October 5, 2018	digital download; streaming	Stone Music Entertainment; Genie Music; King

== JKT48 version ==
"Teacher Teacher"

Song by JKT48

from the album JOY KICK TEARS!
- Language: Indonesian
- Released: October 19, 2019
- Genre: Indo pop
- Length: 4:28
- Label: HITS Records, Dentsu Inter Admark, Universal Music Indonesia
- Composer(s): Belex; Hirotaka Hayakawa
- Lyricist(s): Original Japanese lyrics: Yasushi Akimoto; Indonesia lyrics:
- Producer(s): Yasushi Akimoto

The song has been performed first in 2018 and released in late 2019. Teacher Teacher adopt the lyrics from Japanese and translated in Bahasa Indonesia. The song performed by JKT48's Team KIII with member Shania Gracia as center performer. Teacher Teacher included in the group fourth studio album with the name Joy Kick! Tears.

=== Personnel ===
"Teacher Teacher" was recorded and performed by JKT48's Team KIII performer, consisting of: Shania Gracia (Center), Anastasya Narwastu Tety Handuran, Angelina Christy, Aninditha Rahma Cahyadi, Beby Chaesara Anadila, Gita Sekar Andarini, Helisma Putri, Jennifer Rachel Natasya, Kandiya Rafa Maulidita, Maria Genoveva Natalia Desy Purnamasari Gunawan, Mutiara Azzahra, Nurhayati, Ratu Vienny Fitrilya, Shani Indira Natio, Viviyona Apriani, Yessica Tamara.
