= Crow's Blood =

Japanese television series

Japanese name
- Kanji: CROW'S BLOOD
Transcriptions
- Revised Hepburn: Kurōzu Buraddo
- Genre: Horror
- Created by: Yasushi Akimoto
- Written by: Clint Sears; Satoshi Oshio
- Directed by: Ryo Nishimura
- Starring: Mayu Watanabe; Sakura Miyawaki; Takahiro Miura; Yuki Kashiwagi; Anna Iriyama; Yuria Kizaki; Rena Kato; Mion Mukaichi; Yui Yokoyama; Jurina Matsui; Tetsuya Bessho
- Composer: Gary Ashiya
- Country of origin: Japan
- Original language: Japanese
- No. of seasons: 1
- No. of episodes: 6

Production
- Executive producers: Darren Lynn Bousman; Kazufumi Nagasawa; Shinobu Mouri; Kenji Ikeda
- Producers: Hiroki Iwasaki; Yushi Ito; Sean E. Demott
- Cinematography: Joseph White
- Running time: 33–38 minutes
- Production company: AX-ON

Original release
- Network: Hulu Japan; Nippon TV (Episode 1)
- Release: July 23, 2016

Crow's Blood (stylized as CROW'S BLOOD) is a Japanese six-episode horror television drama series with an original story concept written by Yasushi Akimoto and executive produced by Darren Lynn Bousman.

It stars Mayu Watanabe (at the time a member of AKB48), Sakura Miyawaki (at the time a member of HKT48), Takahiro Miura and Tetsuya Bessho, along with many other then-members of AKB48 Group in supporting roles, and the series was directed by Ryo Nishimura and written by Clint Sears and additional screenplay cooperation by Satoshi Oshio. Episodes also feature cameo appearances by performers including Lily Franky and Shota Sometani. It was marketed in Japan with the slogan "Yasushi Akimoto × Hollywood × AKB48", reflecting the collaboration between Akimoto (noted as both a writer of horror and founder of AKB48 Group), lead staff drawn from the United States of American film and television industry, and members of AKB48 Group.

The first episode premiered on Nippon TV in Japan on July 23, 2016, while all six episodes were released for streaming on Hulu Japan the same day.

In December 2016, Miramax acquired the worldwide sales rights for the series, excluding Japan. The series made its English-language debut in the United States on El Rey Network, which aired all six episodes on October 28, 2017.

In the United Kingdom, the series has been licensed by Channel Four Television Corporation. The first episode was broadcast on Film4 on Wednesday 31 October 2018 and all six episodes were released for advertising-supported streaming on All 4 the same day. Unlike in the United States, in both instances the episodes have only been made available in Japanese with English subtitles.

== Plot ==
As science is growing ever closer to the taboo field of regenerative medicine, a mysterious new student named Maki Togawa begins attending the International Dolly Girls' College (国際ドリー女学園, Kokusai Dorī Onna Gakuen). Soon after, a series of strange and horrific events occur in and around the school, seemingly in the proximity of or due to new student Maki. Another student, named Kaoru Isozaki, finds herself learning that Maki was initially killed in a hit and run and was dead until later revived by her own father, Dr. Akihito Seto, with an experimental regenerative procedure developed by an American scientist. Unfortunately, Dr. Seto learned too late of the side effects on Maki's psyche and cellular tissue, turning her into the patient zero of a new contagious virus, easily transmitted via kissing, which renders females able to regenerate indefinitely, however with some rather horrific side effects.

== Cast ==
Lead cast

- Mayu Watanabe as Kaoru Isozaki
- Sakura Miyawaki as Maki Togawa
- Yuki Kashiwagi as Mai Utsui
- Anna Iriyama as Aoi Nojiri
- Yuria Kizaki as Hikari Yanaka
- Rena Kato as Keiko Yodogawa
- Mion Mukaichi as Nami Katayama
- Yui Yokoyama as Chisa Furugōri
- Jurina Matsui as Shinobu Matsumura
- Tetsuya Bessho as Doctor Akihito Seto

Supporting cast

- Chris Glover as Doctor Gary Grossman
- Takahiro Miura as Takeshi Sawada
- Tomoharu Hasegawa as Kōji Ogasawara
- Tomohiro Kaku as Yoshio Tachibana

Guest cast

- Lily Franky as The Undertaker (cameo)
- Mitsu Dan as Eiko Yoshikawa
- Maiko as Chizuru Tamura
- Shota Sometani as Man in Wheelchair (cameo)
- Katsuya as Detective Shigeo Takuma (cameo)

English dubbing voice cast

- Xanthe Huynh as Kaoru Isozaki
- Cristina Vee as Maki Togawa
- Derek Stephen Prince as Takeshi Sawada
- Richard Epcar as Doctor Gary Grossman
- David Vincent as Kōji Ogasawara
- Todd Haberkorn as Yoshio Tachibana
- Stephanie Sheh as Chizuru Tamura
- Bryce Papenbrook as Man in Wheelchair
- Michael Sorich as Detective Shigeo Takuma
