= Jiwaru Days =

Song by AKB48

- Type A regular edition cover

Single by AKB48
- Released: March 13, 2019
- Genre: J-pop
- Label: King
- Composer(s): Yoshida Tsukasa; Tsukada Kohei
- Lyricist(s): Akimoto Yasushi

AKB48 singles chronology
"No Way Man" (2018)	"Jiwaru Days" (2019)	"Sustainable" (2019)

"Jiwaru Days" (ジワるDAYS) is the 55th single by Japanese idol group AKB48. It was released in Japan by King Records on March 13, 2019, in seven versions. The single features departing member Rino Sashihara as the center performer. It debuted at number one on the Oricon Singles Chart and Billboard Japan Hot 100, with over 1.4 million units sold in Japan in its first week.

This single has been redone in Indonesian by JKT48 and in Thai by BNK48 as commemorative single of the group's 1st generation departure. Both versions was released in 2022.

== Commercial performance ==
"Jiwaru Days" is the 48th AKB48 consecutive single to debut at number one, and the group's 36th consecutive single to sell in excess of a million copies. This made the band second to only B'z in terms of overall best-selling artists in Japan. Despite this, this was considered average in terms of AKB48's past sales, which was attributed to the cancellation of the group's General Election for 2019, which gives fans the opportunity to vote for their favourite singer from the group to front upcoming projects. This is the final single in the Heisei period.

== Track listing ==
Type A
No.	Title	Length
1.	"Jiwaru Days" (ジワるDAYS)
2.	"Watashi Datte Idol!" (私だってアイドル!; I Am Also an Idol!) (Rino Sashihara solo)
3.	"Generation Change"
4.	"Jiwaru Days" (off vocal version)
5.	"Watashi Datte Idol!" (off vocal version)
6.	"Generation Change" (off vocal version)

Type B
No.	Title	Length
1.	"Jiwaru Days" (ジワるDAYS)
2.	"Watashi Datte Idol!" (私だってアイドル!; I Am Also an Idol!) (Rino Sashihara solo)
3.	"Hatsukoi Door" (初恋ドア; First Love Door) (SakamichiAKB)
4.	"Jiwaru Days" (off vocal version)
5.	"Watashi Datte Idol!" (off vocal version)
6.	"Hatsukoi Door" (off vocal version)

Type C
No.	Title	Length
1.	"Jiwaru Days" (ジワるDAYS)
2.	"Watashi Datte Idol!" (私だってアイドル!; I Am Also an Idol!) (Rino Sashihara solo)
3.	"Hitsuzensei" (必然性; Inevitability) (IZ4648)
4.	"Jiwaru Days" (off vocal version)
5.	"Watashi Datte Idol!" (off vocal version)
6.	"Hitsuzensei" (off vocal version)

Theater edition
No.	Title	Length
1.	"Jiwaru Days" (ジワるDAYS)
2.	"Watashi Datte Idol!" (私だってアイドル!; I Am Also an Idol!) (Rino Sashihara solo)
3.	"Okujō Kara Sakebu" (屋上から叫ぶ; Shouting from the Rooftop) (Sucheese)
4.	"Jiwaru Days" (off vocal version)
5.	"Watashi Datte Idol!" (off vocal version)
6.	"Okujō Kara Sakebu" (off vocal version)

== Charts ==
=== Weekly charts ===
Chart (2019)	Peak position
Japan (Japan Hot 100)	1
Japan (Oricon)	1

=== Year-end charts ===
Chart (2019)	Position
Japan (Oricon)	2

== BNK48 version ==
"Jiwaru DAYS"

Single by BNK48
- A-side: "Jiwaru Days"
- B-side: "Pioneer"; "Sakura no Ki ni Narō"
- Released: November 20, 2022
- Label: iAM

BNK48 singles chronology
"Believers" (2022)	"Jiwaru DAYS" (2022)	"Iiwake Maybe" (2023)

The Thai idol group BNK48, a sister group of AKB48, covered the song with the same title. It is their 1st special single for 1st generation members released on November 20, 2022.

=== Track listing ===
- **Bold** indicates centers.

No.	Title	Performers	Length
1.	"Jiwaru DAYS" (A cover of AKB48's "Jiwaru DAYS")	Cherprang, Jaa, Jane, Jennis, Jib, Kaew, Kaimook, Kate, Korn, Mind, Miori, **Mobile**, **Music**, Namneung, Namsai, Noey, Orn, Piam, Pun, **Pupe**, Satchan, Tarwaan	4:51
2.	"Pioneer" (A cover of AKB48's "Pioneer")	Cherprang, Jaa, Jane, **Jennis**, Jib, Kaew, Kaimook, Kate, Korn, Mind, Miori, Mobile, Music, Namneung, Namsai, Noey, Orn, Piam, **Pun**, Pupe, Satchan, Tarwaan	3:51
3.	"Sakura no Ki ni Narō (Thai: ดั่งซากุระ ตลอดไป)" (A cover of AKB48's "Sakura no Ki ni Narō")	Cherprang, Jaa, Jane, Jennis, Jib, **Kaew**, Kaimook, Kate, Korn, Mind, Miori, Mobile, Music, Namneung, Namsai, Noey, Orn, Piam, Pun, Pupe, Satchan, Tarwaan	5:31
4.	"Jiwaru DAYS" (off vocal version)		4:51
5.	"Pioneer" (off vocal version)		3:51
6.	"Sakura no Ki ni Narō" (off vocal version)		5:31
