= Jabaja =

2018 single by AKB48

- CD+DVD Type-A (Limited Edition) cover

Single by AKB48
- Language: Japanese
- B-side: "Pedal to Sharin to Kita Michi to" "Position" "Ai no Moake" "Hetawoutsu" "Buttaoreru Made" "Tomodachi de Imashou" "Kokkyo no Nai Jidai"
- Released: March 14, 2018
- Genre: J-Pop
- Length: 4:17
- Label: King Records (Japan); Genie Music, Stone Music Entertainment (South Korea)
- Composer(s): Akira Sunset; Endo NAOKI
- Lyricist(s): Yasushi Akimoto

AKB48 singles chronology
"11gatsu no Anklet" (2017)	"Jabaja" (2018)	"Teacher Teacher" (2018)

Music video
- "Jabaja" (MV Full) on YouTube

"Jabaja" (ジャーバージャ) is the 51st single by Japanese idol girl group AKB48. It was released in Japan by King Records on March 14, 2018. The single features Nana Okada as the center performer.

== Release ==
The single was released in 11 physical editions and as a digital EP on March 14, 2018.

== Commercial performance ==
"Jabaja" debuted atop the Oricon Singles Chart for the week ending March 18, 2018, with 1,115,843 physical copies sold. The song also debuted atop the Billboard Japan Hot 100 for the week of March 26, 2018.

On March 19, 2018, Billboard Japan reported that the single sold 1,106,382 copies in its first day, then 1,126,783 copies in its first three days, with additional 70,000 copies for a total of 1,202,909 copies sold in its first week, leading the Top Singles Sales chart.

The single was the 6th best-selling single of 2018 on Oricon. The song placed at number 33 at Billboard Japan Hot 100 Year End. It also placed at number 5 on Top Singles Sales Year End chart.

== Track listing ==
Type A
No.	Title	Lyrics	Music	Arrangement	Length
1.	"Jabaja" (ジャーバージャ)	Yasushi Akimoto	Akira Sunset; Endo NAOKI	APAZZI	4:17
2.	"Pedal to Sharin to Kita Michi to" (ペダルと車輪と来た道と)	Akimoto	GRP	Nonaka "Masa" Yuichi	3:30
3.	"Ai no Moake" (愛の喪明け)	Akimoto	SHIRAISHI SaTORI	SHIRAISHI SaTORI	4:53
4.	"Jabaja" (Off Vocal Ver.)		Akira Sunset; Endo NAOKI	APAZZI	4:17
5.	"Pedal to Sharin to Kita Michi to" (Off Vocal Ver.)		GRP	Aoki Kohey	3:30
6.	"Ai no Moake" (Off Vocal Ver.)		SHIRAISHI SaTORI	SHIRAISHI SaTORI	4:50
Total length:					25:17

Type B
No.	Title	Lyrics	Music	Arrangement	Length
1.	"Jabaja" (ジャーバージャ)	Yasushi Akimoto	Akira Sunset; Endo NAOKI	APAZZI	4:17
2.	"Pedal to Sharin to Kita Michi to" (ペダルと車輪と来た道と)	Akimoto	GRP	Nonaka "Masa" Yuichi	3:30
3.	"Hetawoutsu" (下手を打つ)	Akimoto	Maesako Junya; Hayashi Musashi	Hayashi Musashi	4:22
4.	"Jabaja" (Off Vocal Ver.)		Akira Sunset; Endo NAOKI	APAZZI	4:17
5.	"Pedal to Sharin to Kita Michi to" (Off Vocal Ver.)		GRP	Nonaka "Masa" Yuichi	3:30
6.	"Hetawoutsu" (Off Vocal Ver.)		Maesako Junya; Hayashi Musashi	Hayashi Musashi	4:19
Total length:					24:17

Type C
No.	Title	Lyrics	Music	Arrangement	Length
1.	"Jabaja" (ジャーバージャ)	Yasushi Akimoto	Akira Sunset; Endo NAOKI	APAZZI	4:17
2.	"Pedal to Sharin to Kita Michi to" (ペダルと車輪と来た道と)	Akimoto	GRP	Nonaka "Masa" Yuichi	3:30
3.	"Buttaoreru Made" (ぶっ倒れるまで)	Akimoto	BUGBEAR	Nonaka "Masa" Yuichi	4:08
4.	"Jabaja" (Off Vocal Ver.)		Akira Sunset; Endo NAOKI	APAZZI	4:17
5.	"Pedal to Sharin to Kita Michi to" (Off Vocal Ver.)		GRP	Nonaka "Masa" Yuichi	3:30
6.	"Buttaoreru Made" (Off Vocal Ver.)		BUGBEAR	Nonaka "Masa" Yuichi	4:07
Total length:					23:49

Type D
No.	Title	Lyrics	Music	Arrangement	Length
1.	"Jabaja" (ジャーバージャ)	Yasushi Akimoto	Akira Sunset; Endo NAOKI	APAZZI	4:17
2.	"Position"	Akimoto	Aoki Kohey	Aoki Kohey	4:53
3.	"Tomodachi de Imashou" (友達でいましょう)	Akimoto	Izumi Kazuya; Itoh-kun	Tateyama Akiyuki	4:04
4.	"Jabaja" (Off Vocal Ver.)		Akira Sunset; Endo NAOKI	APAZZI	4:17
5.	"Position" (Off Vocal Ver.)		Aoki Kohey	Aoki Kohey	4:53
6.	"Tomodachi de Imashou" (Off Vocal Ver.)		Izumi Kazuya; Itoh-kun	Tateyama Akiyuki	4:03
Total length:					26:27

Type E
No.	Title	Lyrics	Music	Arrangement	Length
1.	"Jabaja" (ジャーバージャ)	Yasushi Akimoto	Akira Sunset; Endo NAOKI	APAZZI	4:17
2.	"Position"	Akimoto	Aoki Kohey	Aoki Kohey	4:53
3.	"Kokkyo no Nai Jidai" (国境のない時代)	Akimoto	Yo-Hey	Yo-Hey	5:09
4.	"Jabaja" (Off Vocal Ver.)		Akira Sunset; Endo NAOKI	APAZZI	4:17
5.	"Position" (Off Vocal Ver.)		Aoki Kohey	Aoki Kohey	4:53
6.	"Kokkyo no Nai Jidai" (Off Vocal Ver.)		Yo-Hey	Yo-Hey	5:07
Total length:					28:36

Theater Edition
No.	Title	Lyrics	Music	Arrangement	Length
1.	"Jabaja" (ジャーバージャ)	Yasushi Akimoto	Akira Sunset; Endo NAOKI	APAZZI	4:17
2.	"Pedal to Sharin to Kita Michi to" (ペダルと車輪と来た道と)	Akimoto	GRP	Nonaka "Masa" Yuichi	3:30
3.	"Tomodachi ga Dekita" (友達ができた)	Akimoto	Izumi Kazuya; Itoh-kun	Tateyama Akiyuki	4:43
4.	"Jabaja" (Off Vocal Ver.)		Akira Sunset; Endo NAOKI	APAZZI	4:17
5.	"Pedal to Sharin to Kita Michi to" (Off Vocal Ver.)		GRP	Nonaka "Masa" Yuichi	3:30
6.	"Tomodachi ga Dekita" (Off Vocal Ver.)		Izumi Kazuya; Itoh-kun	Tateyama Akiyuki	4:42
Total length:					24:59

Notes

- "Jabaja" is performed by 27 members from Senbatsu
- "Pedal to Sharin to Kita Michi to" is performed by STU48
- "Position" is performed by AKB48 Wakate Senbatsu
- "Ai no Moake" is performed by SKE48
- "Hetawoutsu" is performed by NMB48
- "Buttaoreru Made" is performed by HKT48
- "Tomodachi de Imashou" is performed by NGT48 in Type D Edition and by Macharin and Friends in Theater Edition
- "Kokkyo no Nai Jidai" is performed by Sakamichi AKB

== Members ==
=== Jabaja ===
- Team A: Iriyama Anna, Kato Rena, Mukaichi Mion, Yokoyama Yui
- Team K: Kojima Mako, Komiyama Haruka
- Team B: Kashiwagi Yuki, Takahashi Juri
- Team 4: Okada Nana, Ma Chia-Ling, Murayama Yuiri
- Team 8: Okabe Rin, Oguri Yui, Kuranoo Narumi
- Team S: Matsui Jurina
- Team KII: Obata Yuna
- Team E: Suda Akari
- Team N: Yamamoto Sayaka
- Team M: Shiroma Miru
- Team BII: Ota Yuuri
- Team H: Sashihara Rino, Tanaka Miku
- Team KIV: Miyawaki Sakura
- Team TII: Matsuoka Hana
- Team NIII: Ogino Yuka, Nakai Rika
- STU48 1st Generation: Takino Yumiko

=== "Pedal to Sharin to Kita Michi to" ===
STU48 (16 Members) (Takino Yumiko Center)

STU48 1st Generation: Ishida Chiho, Ishida Minami, Isogai Kanon, Ichioka Ayumi, Imamura Mitsuki, Iwata Hina, Okada Nana, Kadowaki Miyuna, Sano Haruka, Takino Yumiko, Tanaka Kouko, Torobu Yuri, Fukuda Akari, Fujiwara Azusa, Mori Kaho, Yabushita Fu

=== "Position" ===
AKB48 Wakate Senbatsu (AKB48若手選抜) (16 Members) (Mukaichi Mion Center)

- Team A: Goto Moe, Chiba Erii, Nishikawa Rei, Mukaichi Mion
- Team B: Kubo Satone, Taniguchi Megu, Hiwatashi Yui, Fukuoka Seina, Yamabe Ayu
- Team 4: Asai Nanami, Kawamoto Saya, Yamauchi Mizuki
- Team 8: Okabe Rin, Oguri Yui, Kuranoo Narumi, Sakaguchi Nagisa

=== "Ai no Moake" ===
SKE48 (16 Members) (Matsui Jurina Center)

Team S: Kitagawa Ryoha, Matsui Jurina Team KII: Ego Yuna, Oba Mina, Obata Yuna, Kitano Ruka, Soda Sarina, Takayanagi Akane, Takeuchi Saki, Hidaka Yuzuki, Furuhata Nao Team E: Kamata Natsuki, Kumazaki Haruka, Suenaga Oka, Sugawara Maya, Suda Akari

=== "Hetawoutsu" ===
NMB48 (16 Members) (Jo Eriko Center)

Team N: Kojima Karin, Tanigawa Airi, Mita Mao, Yamamoto Ayaka, Yamamoto Sayaka Team M: Iwata Momoka, Kato Yuuka, Shibuya Nagisa, Shiroma Miru, Yasuda Momone, Yoshida Akari Team BII: Uemura Azusa, Okita Ayaka, Jo Eriko, Jonishi Rei, Murase Sae

=== "Buttaoreru Made" ===
HKT48 (16 Members) (Sashihara Rino and Miyawaki Sakura Centers)

Team H: Kojina Yui, Komada Hiroka, Sashihara Rino, Tashima Meru, Tanaka Miku, Toyonaga Aki, Matsuoka Natsumi, Yabuki Nako Team KIV: Iwahana Shino, Tomiyoshi Asuka, Tomonaga Mio, Miyawaki Sakura, Motomura Aoi, Moriyasu Madoka Team TII: Matsuoka Hana, Murakawa Bibian

=== "Tomodachi de Imashou" ===
NGT48 (16 Members) (Takakura Moeka Center)

Team NIII: Ogino Yuka, Oguma Tsugumi, Kashiwagi Yuki, Kato Minami, Kitahara Rie, Sato Anju, Sugahara Riko, Takakura Moeka, Tano Ayaka, Nakai Rika, Nishigata Marina, Hasegawa Rena, Homma Hinata, Murakumo Fuka, Yamaguchi Maho, Yamada Noe

=== "Kokkyo no Nai Jidai" ===
Sakamichi AKB (坂道AKB) (18 Members) (Nagahama Neru Center)

Team A: Mukaichi Mion Team 4: Okada Nana Team 8: Okabe Rin, Oguri Yui Team S: Matsui Jurina Team KIV: Miyawaki Sakura Nogizaka46 1st Generation: Saito Asuka Nogizaka46 2nd Generation: Hori Miona Nogizaka46 3rd Generation: Ozono Momoko, Kubo Shiori, Yamashita Mizuki, Yoda Yuuki Kanji Keyakizaka46: Imaizumi Yui, Kobayashi Yui, Sugai Yuuka, Nagahama Neru, Watanabe Risa Hiragana Keyakizaka46: Kato Shiho

=== "Tomodachi ga Dekita" ===
Macharin and Friends. (まちゃりんと仲間たち。) (12 Members) (Ma Chia-Ling Center)

Team A: Chiba Erii, Nishikawa Rei Team B: Kubo Satone, Hiwatashi Yui, Yamabe Ayu Team 4: Ma Chia-Ling TPE48 Trainee: Chen Shih-ya, Chen Shih-yuan, Kuo Shin-yu, Lin Chieh, Chiu Pin-han, Chang Yu-lin

== Charts ==
=== Weekly charts ===
Chart (2018)	Peak position
Japan (Oricon)	1
Japan (Japan Hot 100)	1

=== Year-end charts ===
Chart (2018)	Peak position
Japan (Oricon)	6
Japan (Japan Hot 100)	33

== Certifications ==
Country	Provider	Certifications
Japan	RIAJ	Million

== Release history ==
Region	Date	Format	Label
Japan	March 14, 2018	CD; digital download; streaming	King Records (YOU BE COOL division)
Hong Kong, Taiwan	March 14, 2018	CD; digital download; streaming	King Records
South Korea	August 10, 2018	digital download; streaming	Stone Music Entertainment; Genie Music; King
