= 11gatsu no Anklet =

Single by AKB48

from the album Bokutachi wa, Ano Hi no Yoake wo Shitteiru
- Language: Japanese
- English title: "November's Anklet"
- Released: November 22, 2017
- Genre: J-Pop
- Length: 4:26
- Label: You, Be Cool! / King; Genie Music; Stone Music Entertainment
- Producer: Yasushi Akimoto

AKB48 singles chronology
"Sukinanda" (2017)	"11gatsu no Anklet" (2017)	"Jabaja" (2018)

Music video (Full ver.)
- "11gatsu no Anklet" on YouTube

"11gatsu no Anklet" (11月のアンクレット, Jūichi gatsu no ankuretto; "November's Anklet") is the 50th single by AKB48, released on November 22, 2017. The song was performed during CDTV's Halloween Special Festival and Mayu Watanabe's graduation concert before its release.

The coupling song "Ikiru koto ni Nekkyou wo" was performed on the group's variety show AKBingo! on October 4, 2017.

It is also Mayu Watanabe's last single appearance with the group.

== Release and Promotion ==
The CD was released in various editions: five limited editions (Type A, Type B, Type C, Type D and Type E) as well as five regular editions (Type A, B, C, D and E) and a Theater Edition. The center for this single is Mayu Watanabe and this is her last single as an AKB48 member.

A short version for the music was released on YouTube on October 29, 2017. The full version was released on YouTube on March 13, 2018, after the 51st single, "Jabaja"'s music video was released on February 27, 2018.

== Track listing ==
=== Type A ===
No.	Title	Length
1.	"11gatsu no Anklet"
2.	"Sayonara de Owaru Wake Janai (Mayu Watanabe)"
3.	"Omoidasete Yokatta (STU48)"
4.	"11gatsu no Anklet (off-vocal)"
5.	"Sayonara de Owaru Wake Janai (off-vocal)"
6.	"Omoidasete Yokatta (off-vocal)"

=== Type B ===
No.	Title	Length
1.	"11gatsu no Anklet"
2.	"Sayonara de Owaru Wake Janai (Mayu Watanabe)"
3.	"Ikiru koto ni Nekkyou wo! (Team 8)"
4.	"11gatsu no Anklet (off-vocal)"
5.	"Sayonara de Owaru Wake Janai (off-vocal)"
6.	"Ikiru koto ni Nekkyou wo! (off-vocal)"

=== Type C ===
No.	Title	Length
1.	"11gatsu no Anklet"
2.	"Sayonara de Owaru Wake Janai (Mayu Watanabe)"
3.	"Hohoemi no Toki (7byou-go, Kimi ga Suki ni naru.)"
4.	"11gatsu no Anklet (off-vocal)"
5.	"Sayonara de Owaru Wake Janai (off-vocal)"
6.	"Hohoemi no Toki (off-vocal)"

=== Type D ===
No.	Title	Length
1.	"11gatsu no Anklet"
2.	"Sayonara de Owaru Wake Janai (Mayu Watanabe)"
3.	"Yaban na Kyuuyai (Dance Senbatsu)"
4.	"11gatsu no Anklet (off-vocal)"
5.	"Sayonara de Owaru Wake Janai (off-vocal)"
6.	"Yaban na Kyuuyai (off-vocal)"

=== Type E ===
No.	Title	Length
1.	"11gatsu no Anklet"
2.	"Sayonara de Owaru Wake Janai (Mayu Watanabe)"
3.	"Hotei Sokudo to Yuuetsukan (U-17 Senbatsu)"
4.	"11gatsu no Anklet (off-vocal)"
5.	"Sayonara de Owaru Wake Janai (off-vocal)"
6.	"Hotei Sokudo to Yuuetsukan (off-vocal)"

=== Theater Edition ===
No.	Title	Length
1.	"11gatsu no Anklet"
2.	"Sayonara de Owaru Wake Janai (Mayu Watanabe)"
3.	"Yosougai no Story (Vocal Senbatsu)"
4.	"11gatsu no Anklet (off-vocal)"
5.	"Sayonara de Owaru Wake Janai (off-vocal)"
6.	"Yosougai no Story (off-vocal)"

== Senbatsu ==
- Team A: Anna Iriyama, Yui Yokoyama
- Team K: Minami Minegishi, Mion Mukaichi
- Team B: Yuki Kashiwagi, Rena Kato, Mayu Watanabe
- Team 4: Nana Okada, Mako Kojima, Juri Takahashi
- Team 8: Rin Okabe, Yui Oguri
- Team S: Jurina Matsui
- Team KII: Yuna Obata
- Team E: Akari Suda
- Team N: Ayaka Yamamoto, Sayaka Yamamoto
- Team M: Miru Shiroma, Akari Yoshida
- Team H : Haruka Kodama, Rino Sashihara, Miku Tanaka
- Team KIV: Sakura Miyawaki
- Team TII: Hana Matsuoka
- Team NIII: Yuka Ogino, Rie Kitahara, Rika Nakai
- STU48 Kenkyuusei: Yumiko Takino

=== "Sayonara de Owaru Wake Janai" ===
Mayuyu Graduation Song

- Team B: Watanabe Mayu

=== "Omoidasete Yokatta" ===
STU48 (16 Members) (Takino Yumiko Center)

- STU48 1st Generation: Ishida Chiho, Ishida Minami, Isogai Kanon, Ichioka Ayumi, Imamura Mitsuki, Iwata Hina, Okada Nana, Kadowaki Miyuna, Sano Haruka, Takino Yumiko, Tanaka Kouko, Torobu Yuri, Fukuda Akari, Fujiwara Azusa, Mori Kaho, Yabushita Fu

=== "Ikiru Koto ni Nekkyou wo!" ===
Team 8 (チーム8) (20 Members) (Oguri Yui & Kuranoo Narumi Centers)

- Team 8: Utada Hatsuka, Ota Nao, Onishi Momoka, Okabe Rin, Oguri Yui, Oda Erina, Kuranoo Narumi, Sakaguchi Nagisa, Sato Akari, Sato Shiori, Sato Nanami, Shitao Miu, Shimoaoki Karin, Tanikawa Hijiri, Nakano Ikumi, Nagano Serika, Hitomi Kotone, Honda Hitomi, Yamada Nanami, Yoshikawa Nanase

=== "Hohoemi no Toki" ===
7byou-go, Kimi ga Suki ni naru. (7秒後、君が好きになる。) (7 Members) (Komiyama Haruka Center)

- Team A: Taniguchi Megu
- Team K: Kubo Satone
- Team B: Fukuoka Seina
- Team 4: Kawamoto Saya, Komiyama Haruka
- Team 8: Kuranoo Narumi
- Team H: Yabuki Nako

=== "Yaban na Kyuuai" ===
Dance Senbatsu (ダンス選抜) (8 Members) (Yamamoto Sayaka Center)

- Team K: Fujita Nana
- Team 8: Nakano Ikumi, Yokoyama Yui
- Team S: Jurina Matsui
- Team E: Saito Makiko
- Team N: Yamamoto Sayaka
- Team M: Kato Yuuka
- Team KIV: Motomura Aoi

=== "Hotei Sokudo to Yuuetsukan" ===
AKB48 Group U-17 Senbatsu (AKB48グループ U-17選抜) (25 Members) (Oguri Yui Center)

- Team A: Hiwatashi Yui
- Team K: Kubo Satone
- Team B: Goto Moe, Nishikawa Rei, Fukuoka Seina, Yamabe Ayu
- Team 4: Chiba Erii
- Team 8: Kuranoo Narumi, Oguri Yui, Sakaguchi Nagisa
- AKB48 Kenkyuusei: Asai Nanami, Yamauchi Mizuki
- Team KII: Obata Yuna
- Team E: Goto Rara, Sugawara Maya
- Team N: Yamamoto Ayaka
- Team BII: Ota Yuuri, Jonishi Rei
- Team H: Tanaka Miku, Yabuki Nako
- Team TII: Matsuoka Hana
- Team NIII: Takakura Moeka, Homma Hinata
- STU48 1st Generation: Iwata Hina, Yabushita Fu

=== "Yosougai no Story" ===
Vocal Senbatsu (ボーカル選抜) (8 Members) (Okada Nana & Kashiwagi Yuki Center)

- Team A: Yokoyama Yui
- Team K: Tano Yuka, Minegishi Minami
- Team B: Yuki Kashiwagi
- Team 4: Okada Nana
- Team KII: Takayanagi Akane
- Team N: Yamamoto Sayaka
- Team M: Shiroma Miru

== Release history ==
Region	Date	Format	Label
Japan	November 22, 2017	CD; digital download; streaming	King Records (YOU BE COOL division)
Hong Kong, Taiwan	November 22, 2017	CD; digital download; streaming	King Records
South Korea	August 17, 2018	digital download; streaming	Stone Music Entertainment; Genie Music; King
