= List of Our Last Crusade or the Rise of a New World episodes =

Our Last Crusade or the Rise of a New World is an anime television series based on the light novel series of the same name written by Kei Sazane and illustrated by Ao Nekonabe. Announced at the "Fantasia Bunko Dai Kanshasai 2019" event on October 20, 2019, it was animated by Silver Link and directed by Shin Oonuma and Mirai Minato, with Kento Shimoyama handling series composition and Kaori Sato as character designer and chief animation director. Seima Iwahashi, Ryōta Tomura, and Ryūichirō Fujinaga of Elements Garden composed the series' music. The series aired from October 7 to December 23, 2020, on AT-X and other channels. Kaori Ishihara performed the opening theme "Against.", while Sora Amamiya performed the ending theme "Koori no Torikago" (氷の鳥籠; "Ice Bird Cage"). (Note: "Koori no Torikago" is used as an insert song in episode 21.)

Funimation licensed the series and streamed it in North America, Britain, and Ireland, and an English dub was released on October 28, 2020. On October 27, 2020, Funimation announced that the series would receive an English dub, which premiered the following day. Following Sony's acquisition of Crunchyroll, the series was moved to Crunchyroll.

A sequel was green-lit on October 1, 2021, which was later revealed to be a second season. It was animated by Silver Link and Studio Palette, and directed by Yuki Inaba, with Studio Palette credited for series composition, Kaori Yoshihara designing the characters, and Elements Garden composing the music. It was initially scheduled for 2023, but was later delayed, and eventually aired from July 10, 2024, to June 26, 2025. The opening theme song is "Senaka Awase" (セナカアワセ; "Back to Back") performed by AliA, while the ending theme song is "Para Bellum", performed by Sizuk. Crunchyroll licensed the series. Plus Media Networks Asia licensed the series in Southeast Asia, broadcasting it on Aniplus Asia.

On August 6, 2024, it was announced that the fifth episode of the second season would be delayed indefinitely, and reruns from the first season would fill the broadcast. The season resumed airing on April 10, 2025, with the first new episode airing on May 8 of the same year.

A third season was announced during the "Fantasia Bunko Grand Thanksgiving Festival 2026 Online" event on October 25, 2026. The cast and staff from previous seasons will reprise their roles.

== Series overview ==
Season	Episodes	Originally released	
Season	Episodes	First released	Last released
1	12	October 7, 2020	December 23, 2020
2	12	July 10, 2024	June 26, 2025

== Episodes ==
=== Season 1 (2020) ===
No. overall	No. in season	Title	Directed by	Written by	Original release date
1	1	"Encounter: The Two Nations' Ultimate Weapons"; Transliteration: "Kaigō ― Futatsu no Kuni no Saishū Heiki ―" (Japanese: 邂逅 ―2つの国の最終兵器―)	Mirai Minato	Kento Shimoyama	October 7, 2020
Iska, the youngest Saint Disciple of the Heavenly Empire, helps a witch escape from captivity for unknown reasons, only to be imprisoned himself for the act. One year later, the Octet grants him his release and his astral swords, on the condition that he hunts down a purebred witch. After reuniting with his comrades Jhin, Nene, and Mismis from the 907th Unit, the four of them head to a disputed territory where the Empire is defending a power plant from the astral mages of the Nebulis Sovereignty. Iska and his unit soon find themselves battling several mages and manage to subdue them non-lethally. However, the purebred "Ice Calamity Witch," Aliceliese Lou Nebulis IX, takes the field herself and shatters the Empire's power plant with her magic. Alice and Iska end up fighting to a draw, with both expressing their wish to end the ongoing war before Alice retreats. Later, Alice attends an opera with her maid Rin, when she is handed a handkerchief by a man who turns out to be Iska.
2	2	"Encounter: The Enemy You and I Met Was..."; Transliteration: "Kaigō ― Boku to Watashi ga Deatta Teki wa ―" (Japanese: 邂逅 ―僕とわたしが出会った敵は―)	Yūshi Ibe	Kento Shimoyama	October 14, 2020
Iska gets a ticket to an opera in the neutral city-state of Ein, and accidentally gets a seat next to Alice. Alice and Rin head to a nearby restaurant, only to find themselves seated at Iska's table, where Alice and Iska order the exact same dish. Later that evening, Alice's mother, Queen Nebulis, mentions that the seal on the Nebulis founder is weakening and hints that it might be linked to the swordsman Alice fought before. Alice and Iska have trouble sleeping in their respective beds. The next day, Iska and Alice accidentally meet again in Ein, as they tour an art exhibit at the same time. Afterwards, Iska falls asleep on Alice's shoulder, quietly embarrassing her. Meanwhile, the Octet agree to reinstate Iska as Saint Disciple if he captures the Ice Calamity Witch.
3	3	"Encounter: Successor of the Black Steel and the Ice Calamity Witch"; Transliteration: "Kaigō ― Kuro-kō no Kōkei to Kōri-ka no Majo ―" (Japanese: 邂逅 ―黒鋼の後継と氷禍の魔女―)	Yūta Maruyama	Kento Shimoyama	October 21, 2020
Iska arrives in the 907th Unit's office when Risya tells him the Octet wants to see him. There, he is informed that they want him to apprehend the Ice Calamity Witch. When he returns to his room, Iska asks Mismis if he can go to the neutral city. She agrees on the condition that she comes with him. Meanwhile, at the palace, Rin gives Alice a dossier on Iska. After having a conversation with her mother, Alice tells Rin that she wants them to head to the neutral city. The next day, Iska, Mismis, Alice, and Rin meet up in the neutral city. After Iska reveals why he rescued the witch the year prior, Alice asks Iska to defect from the Empire. Before he can give an answer, they are attacked by the now free Founder Nebulis. During the battle, Rin is injured. Once Mismis takes Rin to the hospital, Iska and Alice team up in order to defeat the Founder Nebulis. Afterwards, Iska turns down Alice's request. They then agree to a temporary truce for the rest of the day.
4	4	"Intersection: Battle for the Vortex"; Transliteration: "Kōsa ― Borutekkusu Kōbō ―" (Japanese: 交差 ―ボルテックス攻防―)	Chijimisuke Shichimi	Kento Shimoyama	October 28, 2020
In the city of Jurak, the 907th Unit are playing the slot machines in a casino. Meanwhile, Alice and Rin arrive at the casino. When Alice hits the jackpot, she shares her winnings with Nene. Once everyone leaves, Alice and Iska head to a fortune teller where they receive the same fortune. Sometime later, Risya informs the 907th Unit about a vortex at the Myudol valley. At the palace, Rin tells Alice that the Empire troops have been deployed towards Myudol valley. She also reveals that the Zoa family have been delaying their report to her mother. They later confront Lord Mask who reveals why the report was delayed. At the Myudol valley, the troops meet one of the members of the Saint Disciples named Nameless. During their search for the vortex, the 907 Unit is informed that one of the units has gone missing. When they head back to the base, Nameless decides against deploying a rescue squad. When Iska tries to speak to Nameless, Mismis does so in his place. Later that night, Alice decides to head to the Myudol valley herself. Meanwhile, Lord Mask approaches Kissing Zoa Nebulis IX.
5	5	"Intersection: Awakening of the Vortex"; Transliteration: "Kōsa ― Borutekkusu Kakusei ―" (Japanese: 交差 ―ボルテックス覚醒―)	Masahiro Hosoda	Kento Shimoyama	November 4, 2020
When Alice and Rin arrive at the vortex, Lord Mask shows up with Kissing. Lord Mask explains that he wants to have an all-out war with the Empire. Meanwhile, the 907th Unit is monitoring the Myudol valley when they notice an astral light. Heading towards the area of the light, they encounter Shanorotte Gregory's unit, who reveal that they are actually astral mages. Nameless suddenly arrives and he takes out Shanorotte's squad, though she manages to escape with Mismis. When Shanorotte brings Mismis to the vortex, Alice decides to use the opportunity to head to the Imperial army's base. Sometime later, Iska arrives at the vortex to rescue Mismis. Just then, Kissing demonstrates her power. At the base, Alice takes on Nameless. Back at the vortex, Iska and Kissing fight each other with Iska emerging as the victor. Afterwards, Lord Mask kicks Mismis into the vortex. When Iska jumps in to rescue her, Alice follows them. Thanks to Alice's help, all three are able to survive.
6	6	"Paradise: Rin's Big Miscalculation"; Transliteration: "Rakuen ― Rin no Dai Gosan ―" (Japanese: 楽園 ―燐の大誤算―)	Yamato Ōuchi, Mirai Minato	Kento Shimoyama	November 11, 2020
While Alice is reminiscing about her previous encounter with Iska, she is approached by Rin, who suggest that they head to the neutral city. Meanwhile, the 907th Unit are in their office when Mismis complains about her shoulder. They are then given a mission by Risya to infiltrate the Nebulis Sovereignty. Sometime later, Alice and Rin look for Iska in the neutral city. Back in the 907th Unit's office, everyone discovers that Mismis is now an astral mage. Despite this, Iska, Jhin, and Nene decide to remain loyal to her. The next day, Iska and Mismis are enjoying themselves in the neutral city. When they split up, he is eventually approached by Alice. After a while, Rin shows up and she gives them some juice. Once Iska passes out, Rin reveals that she spiked his juice with a sleep-inducing drug. She then admits that she did not expect him to actually drink it. As they are taking Iska away, Mismis returns and she tries to stop them. However, Alice freezes her foot. Later, Risya reports to Emperor Yunmelngen that Iska has been captured.
7	7	"Paradise: Alice's Longest Night"; Transliteration: "Rakuen ― Arisu no Ichiban Nagaiyo ―" (Japanese: 楽園 ―アリスの一番長い夜―)	Yūshi Ibe	Kento Shimoyama	November 18, 2020
After some convincing from Alice, Rin decides to take Iska to Alcatroz. Meanwhile, Risya reports to the Octet about the situation. She then brings up that Salinger the Transcendent is being held there as well. Afterwards, she heads to the 907th Unit's office where she uses a gadget so Nene, Mismis, and Jhin can go undercover as astral mages. In Alcatroz, Iska wakes up earlier than expected while the rest of the 907th Unit successfully cross the border. At a hotel, Rin volunteers to watch Iska. The 907th Unit meanwhile meet up with Risya. Back at the hotel, once Alice leaves the room, Rin attempts to kill Iska. However, she is stopped when Alice returns. At the Ollelugan Prison Tower, Jhin realizes that the Empire has an ulterior motive for the mission. After some brief awkwardness between Iska and Alice, Iska notices Alice's astral crest. When she asks him what he thinks about her and her astral crest, his response makes her happy. Later, Risya introduces herself to Salinger.
8	8	"Paradise: The Transcendent Demon"; Transliteration: "Rakuen ― Chōetsu no Majin ―" (Japanese: 楽園 ―超越の魔人―)	Yūsuke Sekine	Kento Shimoyama	November 25, 2020
Risya explains to Salinger that she is going to help him escape. Meanwhile, at the hotel, Rin reports to Alice that someone has infiltrated the Sovereignty. At Ollelugan, Mismis, Jhin, and Nene are surrounded by guards when they hear an explosion. They then receive a call from Risya, who lies about the situation. Rin later relays to Alice that Salinger has escaped from Ollelugan and they leave Iska behind. Back at Ollelugan, Mismis acts as bait, which allows Jhin and Nene to take out the guards. When they finally get in contact with Iska, it appears that he is stuck at the hotel until he realizes Alice secretly left behind a key so he can escape. He then heads to Ollelugan. When Alice and Rin arrive at Ollelugan, they split up. Iska meanwhile arrives at Ollelugan as well. Once Rin finds Salinger, she challenges him to a fight and ends up getting overwhelmed. Just as Salinger is about to kill Rin, Iska saves her.
9	9	"Paradise: Iska"; Transliteration: "Rakuen ― Isuka ―" (Japanese: 楽園 ―イスカ―)	Yūta Maruyama	Kento Shimoyama	December 2, 2020
During the battle with Salinger, Iska has Rin promise that if he defeats Salinger, she will not stop him and his friends until they cross the border. Meanwhile, at the palace, Schwartz reports the situation at Ollelugan to Sisbell Lou Nebulis IX. Back at Ollelugan, Rin aides Iska, while Alice is briefly confronted by Nameless. Alice then shows up at Iska and Rin's location, which allows Iska to turn the tables on Salinger. As such, Salinger decides to flee. The next morning, Rin reports to Alice that the prisoners have been accounted for and the Imperial soldiers have retreated. In the Empire, it is revealed that Risya was the one who actually confronted Alice as the real Nameless reports that the Central Province of the Sovereignty has been infiltrated. The 907th Unit meanwhile head home together. At the palace, Alice and Rin are having a conversation about Iska when it is revealed that Sisbell is spying on them. She soon realizes that Iska is the same Imperial soldier who rescued her.
10	10	"Beginning: The Girl Wishes Upon a Star"; Transliteration: "Shidō ― Hoshi ni Negau Shōjo ―" (Japanese: 始動 ―星に願う少女―)	Chijimisuke Shichimi	Kento Shimoyama	December 9, 2020
Risya meets up with Emperor Yunmelngen where she gives her report to him. At the palace, the queen orders Sisbell to head to Aksamira, an independent nation, to investigate if they have sided with the Empire. Meanwhile, the 907th Unit catch a break when Michaela, a member of the medical coordination team, puts them on forced leave for 60 days due to being overworked. Later, Elletear Lou Nebulis IX, Alice and Sisbell's older sister, has a conversation with Lord Mask. When the 907th Unit arrive in Aksamira, they spend the day having fun. After they separate, Sisbell runs into Iska and she decides to follow him. Back at the palace, the queen, Alice, and Rin go inside Sisbell's room. There, Alice and Rin discover that Sisbell knows about Iska while Sisbell asks Iska to come with her to the Sovereignty.
11	11	"Beginning: The Witch Hunt"; Transliteration: "Shidō ― Majogari ―" (Japanese: 始動 ―魔女狩り―)	Masahiro Hosoda	Kento Shimoyama	December 16, 2020
Sisbell thanks Iska for saving her the year prior. When he wonders why she wants him to accompany her to the Sovereignty, she becomes emotional. After they part ways, Sisbell vows that she will not give up. Meanwhile, at the palace, Rin convinces the queen to allow Alice to travel to Aksamira so can talk to Sisbell alone. At the Empire, the Octet decide to deploy the Object against Sisbell. The next day, Iska is too preoccupied thinking about the conversation he had with Sisbell. Elletear meanwhile tells Lord Mask that she believes her sisters might betray the Sovereignty. As such, Lord Mask agrees to look into the matter. While Alice is traveling to Aksamira, she notices giant tracks that head in the same direction. Later, Iska leaves his friends to meet up with Sisbell. After she reveals the reason why she wants his help, they are confronted by Lord Mask. When Sisbell attempts to flee, she is targeted by the Object.
12	12	"Beginning: The Two of Them Trigger the Rise of a New World"; Transliteration: "Shidō ― Aruiwa Sekai o Hajimeru Futari ―" (Japanese: 始動 ―あるいは世界を始める2人―)	Mirai Minato, Yūshi Ibe, Yamato Ōuchi	Kento Shimoyama	December 23, 2020
While Iska and Nene fight the Object, Lord Mask tries to intervene, but he gets stopped by Jhin. Jhin and Mismis distract Lord Mask, but end up getting cornered. Jhin manages to shoot at Lord Mask, but he hits the recorder which contained the proof of Sisbell communicating with Iska. Lord Mask then tries to burn them using gasoline, but Mismis uses her astral powers to extinguish the flames as Jhin takes a shot at Lord Mask, which causes him to retreat. Meanwhile, Nene attempts to attack the Object, but it shields itself. Nene then retreats with the rest of the team to evacuate civilians while Iska and Sisbell fight with the Object. During the battle, an astral spirit comes out and traps Sisbell inside. Alice suddenly arrives, leading to her and Iska once again teaming up. After the fight, Sisbell asks if Alice and Iska are acquainted, which they deny. Sisbell then says that she wants Iska to be her knight. However, Iska manages get out of the situation when his friends call for him.

=== Season 2 (2024–2025) ===
No. overall	No. in season	Title	Directed by (Note: Production staff information is taken from the ending credits of each episode.)	Written by	Original release date
13	1	"Witch: Planet's Fate"; Transliteration: "Majo ― Boshi no Unmei ―" (Japanese: 魔女 ―星の運命―)	Yuki Inaba	Shunsuke Ishikawa & Yuki Inaba	July 10, 2024
14	2	"Witch: War Between the Sisters (AKA Alice Explodes)"; Transliteration: "Majo ― Shimai Sensō (Arisu Dai Bakuhatsu) ―" (Japanese: 魔女 ―姉妹戦争(アリスだいばくはつ)―)	Yuki Inaba	Shunsuke Ishikawa & Yuki Inaba	July 17, 2024
15	3	"Witch: Dance Between the Moon, the Planet, and the Sun"; Transliteration: "Majo ― Tsuki to Hoshi to Taiyō no Dansu ―" (Japanese: 魔女 ―月と星と太陽のダンス―)	Yuki Inaba	Shunsuke Ishikawa & Yuki Inaba	July 24, 2024
16	4	"Line of Descent: My Name is Elletear"; Transliteration: "Kechimyaku ― Irītia Tomōshimasu ―" (Japanese: 血脈 ―イリーティアと申します―)	Yuki Inaba	Kei Sazane	July 31, 2024
17	5	"Line of Descent: Three-Sister War (AKA Alice Has Had Enough)"; Transliteration: "Kechimyaku ― Sanshimai Sensō (Arisu Gaman Dekinai) ―" (Japanese: 血脈 ―三姉妹戦争(アリスがまんできない)―)	Yuki Inaba	Shunsuke Ishikawa & Yuki Inaba	May 8, 2025
18	6	"Line of Descent: Beginning of the End of Paradise"; Transliteration: "Kechimyaku ― Rakuen no Hōkai no Hajimari ―" (Japanese: 血脈 ―楽園の崩壊の始まり―)	Yuki Inaba	Shunsuke Ishikawa & Yuki Inaba	May 15, 2025
19	7	"Last Crusade: Night of the Witch Hunt"; Transliteration: "Kessen ― Majokari no Yoru ―" (Japanese: 決戦 ―魔女狩りの夜―)	Yuki Inaba	Shunsuke Ishikawa & Yuki Inaba	May 22, 2025
20	8	"Last Crusade: The Unforgiven One"; Transliteration: "Kessen ― Yurusarezaru Mono ―" (Japanese: 決戦 ―許されざる者―)	Yuki Inaba	Shunsuke Ishikawa & Yuki Inaba	May 29, 2025
21	9	"Last Crusade: Our Last Crusade or the Night We Make Our Vow"; Transliteration: "Kessen ― Kimi to Boku no Saigo no Kessen, Aruiwa Futari ga Chikau Yoru ―" (Japanese: 決戦 ―キミと僕の最後の決戦、あるいは二人が誓う夜―)	Yuki Inaba	Shunsuke Ishikawa & Yuki Inaba	June 5, 2025
22	10	"Reclaim: the World Rises"; Transliteration: "Gyōsei ― Soshite Sekai wa Ugokidasu ―" (Japanese: 暁星 ―そして世界は動き出す―)	Yamato Ōuchi	Shunsuke Ishikawa & Yuki Inaba	June 12, 2025
23	11	"Morning Star: Snow the Sun"; Transliteration: "Gyōsei ― Sunō za San ―" (Japanese: 暁星 ―雪と太陽(スノウ・ザ・サン)―)	Hitoshi Motoi	Shunsuke Ishikawa & Yuki Inaba	June 19, 2025
24	12	"Morning Star: Welcome with a Round of Applause"; Transliteration: "Gyōsei ― Hakushu to Kassai de Demukae yo ―" (Japanese: 暁星 ―拍手と喝采で出迎えよ―)	Yuki Inaba	Yuki Inaba	June 26, 2025
