= Hishikawa =

Hishikawa (written: 菱川 lit. "diamond river") is a Japanese surname. Notable people with the surname include:

- Hishikawa Moronobu (菱川 師宣) (1618–1694), Japanese ukiyo-e artist
- Seiichi Hishikawa (菱川 勢一) (born 1969), Japanese art director

Fictional characters:

- Rikka Hishikawa (菱川 六花), character in the anime series Dokidoki! PreCure
