= AKB48 videography =

AKB48 (pronounced A.K.B. Forty-eight) is a Japanese idol girl group named after the Akihabara (Akiba for short) area in Tokyo, where the group's theater is located. The group has expanded since then to include over 130 members as of December 2015, aged from their early teens to their mid-20s.

- For individual member's filmography, see their articles.

== Music videos ==
All songs credited to AKB48 except when otherwise stated in the Artist field.

Single no.	Music video / Artist(s)	Director	Notes
Indy – 1	"Sakura no Hanabiratachi"	Yuichiro Hirakawa	
Indy – 2	"Skirt, Hirari"	Wataru Takeishi	
1	"Aitakatta"	Yuichiro Hirakawa	
2	"Seifuku ga Jama o Suru"	Hideaki Sunaga	
3	"Keibetsu Shiteita Aijō"	Eiki Takahashi	
4	"Bingo!"	Wataru Takeishi	
5	"Boku no Taiyō"	Masaki Takehisa	
6	"Yūhi o Miteiru ka?"	Eiki Takahashi	
7	"Romance, Irane"	Wataru Takeishi	
8	"Sakura no Hanabiratachi 2008"	Eiki Takahashi	
9	"Baby! Baby! Baby!"	Yuki Mori	
10	"Ōgoe Diamond"	Eiki Takahashi	
11	"10nen Sakura"	Eiki Takahashi	
12	"Namida Surprise!"	Eiki Takahashi	
13	"Iiwake Maybe"	Eiki Takahashi	
13	"Tobenai Agehachō" / Under Girls	Tatsuya Saito	
14	"River"	Eiki Takahashi	
14	"Kimi no Koto ga Suki Dakara" / Under Girls	Tatsuya Saito	
14	"Hikōkigumo (Theater Girls Ver.)" / Theater Girls	Hiroki Kadota	
15	"Sakura no Shiori"	Shunji Iwai	
15	"Majisuka Rock 'n' Roll"	Futoshi Sato	
15	"Enkyori Poster" / Team PB	Tatsuya saito	
15	"Choose Me!" / Team YJ	Takeshi Maruyama	
16	"Ponytail to Shushu"	Eiki Takahashi	
16	"Nusumareta Kuchibiru" / Under Girls	Tatsuya Saito	
16	"Boku no Yell" / Theater Girls	Takeshi Maruyama, Masafumi Taguchi	
16	"Majijo Teppen Blues"	Futoshi Sato	
17	"Heavy Rotation"	Mika Ninagawa	
17	"Namida no Seesaw Game" / Under Girls	Takeshi Maruyama	
17	"Yasai Sisters" / Yasai Sisters	Kazuhiro Okuma	
17	"Lucky Seven"	Takumi Shiga	
18	"Beginner"	Tetsuya Nakashima	
18	"Boku Dake no Value" / Under Girls	Takeshi Maruyama	
18	"Kimi ni Tsuite" / MINT	Eiki Takahashi	
18	"Nakeru Basho" / DIVA (Note: The subgroup Diva that sang on "Nakeru Basho" and "Area K" is not the same as the AKB48 subunit DiVA that was formed on February 27, 2011.)	Tatsuya Saito	
19	"Chance no Junban"	Takeshi Maruyama	
19	"Yoyakushita Christmas"	Masatsugu Nagasoe	
19	"Kurumi to Dialogue" / Team A	Taikou Nakamura	
19	"Alive" / Team K	Takeshi Maruyama	
19	"Love Jump" / Team B	Tatsuya Saito	
20	"Sakura no Ki ni Narō"	Hirokazu Koreeda	
20	"Gūzen no Jūjiro" / Under Girls	Yousei Ohashi	
20	"Kiss made 100 Mile" / MINT	Takeshi Maruyama	
20	"Area K" / DIVA	Taikou Nakamura	
21	"Everyday, Katyusha"	Katsuyuki Motohiro	
21	"Kore kara Wonderland"	Taikou Nakamura	
21	"Yankee Soul"	Futoshi Sato	
21	"Hito no Chikara" / Under Girls	Takeshi Maruyama	
22	"Flying Get"	Yukihiko Tsutsumi	
22	"Flying Get (Dancing Version)"	Yukihiko Tsutsumi	
22	"Dakishimecha Ikenai" / Under Girls	Taikou Nakamura	
22	"Seishun to Kizukanai Mama"	Futoshi Sato	
22	"Ice no Kuchizuke"	Takeshi Maruyama	
23	"Kaze wa Fuiteiru"	Hideki Kuroda	
23	"Kaze wa Fuiteiru (Dance! Dance! Dance! Ver.)"	Hideki Kuroda	
23	"Kimi no Senaka" / Under Girls	Eiki Takahashi	
23	"Vamos" / Under Girls Baragumi	Taikou Nakamura	
23	"Gondola Lift" / Under Girls Yurigumi	Takeshi Maruyama	
24	"Ue kara Mariko"	Eiki Takahashi	
24	"Noël no Yoru"	Hiroyuki Nakano	
24	"Rinjin wa Kizutsukanai" / Team A	Taikou Nakamura	
24	"Zero-sum Taiyō" / Team K	Takeshi Maruyama	
24	"Yobisute Fantasy" / Team B	Mika Ninagawa	
25	"Give Me Five!"	Shigemichi Sugita	
25	"Sweet & Bitter" / Selection 6	Hiroyuki Nakano	
25	"New Ship" / Special Girls A	Hideaki Fukui	
25	"Hitsujikai no Tabi" / Special Girls B	Taikou Nakamura	
26	"Manatsu no Sounds Good!"	Shinji Higuchi	
26	"Manatsu no Sounds Good! (Dance Ver.)"	Shinji higuchi	
26	"Mittsu no Namida" / Special Girls	Hideaki Fukui	
26	"Chōdai, Darling!"	Taikou Nakamura	
26	"Gugutasu no Sora"	Yu-ya HARA	
27	"Gingham Check"	Joseph Kahn	Features actors Hideo Ishiguro, Kouhei Takeda, and Dori Sakurada
27	"Yume no Kawa"	Eiki Takahashi	
27	"Nante Bohemian" / Under Girls	Taikō Nakamura	
27	"Doremifa Onchi" / Next Girls	Yu-ya Hara	
27	"Show Fight" / Future Girls	Takeshi Maruyama	
28	"Uza"	Joseph Kahn	
28	"Uza (Dance Ver.)"	Joseph Kahn	
28	"Tsugi no Season"	Hidenobu Tanabe	
28	"Kodoku no Hoshizora" / Team A	Taikō Nakamura	
28	"Scrap & Build" / Team K	Kensaku Kakimoto	
28	"Seigi no Mikata ja Nai Hero" / Team B	Yasuhiko Shimizu	
28	"Gingham Check (Director Eiki Takahashi Ver.)"	Eiki Takahashi	
29	"Eien Pressure"	Eiki Takahashi	
29	"Totteoki Christmas"	Takeshi Maruyama	
29	"Eien yori Tsuzuku Yō ni" / OKL48	Taikō Nakamura	
29	"First Rabbit"	Kensaku Kakimoto	
29	"Team B Oshi" / Team B	Taikō Nakamura	
29	"Sakura no Hanabira (Atsuko Maeda Ver.)" / Atsuko Maeda	Takeshi Maruyama	
30	"So Long!"	Nobuhiko Obayashi	The full version of the video was 64 minutes long.
30	"Waiting Room"	Toshiro Sonoda	
30	"Ruby" / Team A	Kensaku Kakimoto	
30	"Yūhi Marie" / Team K	Yasuhiko Shimizu	
30	"Soko de Inu no Unchi Fun Jau ka ne?" / Team B	Wataru Takeishi	
30	"Sugar Rush"	Mika Ninagawa	
31	"Sayonara Crawl"	Mika Ninagawa	
31	"Bara no Kajitsu"	Taikou Nakamura	
31	"Ikiru Koto" / Team A	Maruyama Takeshi	
31	"How Come?" / Team K	Yasuhiko Shimizu	
31	"Romance Kenjū" / Team B	Hideaki Fukui	
31	"Haste to Waste" / BKA48	Wataru Takeishi	
32	"Koi Suru Fortune Cookie"	Sekine Kosai	Involved 3800 extras.
32	"Ai no Imi o Kangaete Mita" / Under Girls	Teppei Nakamura	
32	"Kondo Koso Ecstasy" / Next Girls	Tetsuo Inoue	
32	"Suitei Marmalade" / Future Girls	Kazuaki Seki	
32	"Saigo no Door"	Kubo Shigeaki	
32	"Namida no Sei Janai"	Eiki Takahashi	
33	"Heart Electric"	Shusuke Kaneko	
33	"Heart Electric (Dance Ver.)"	Shusuke Kaneko	
33	"Kaisoku to Dōtai Shiryoku" / Under Girls	Taikou Nakamura	
33	"Kisu made Countdown" / Team A	Wataru Takeishi	
33	"Sasameyuki Regret" / Team K	Tetsuo Inoue	
33	"Tiny T-shirt" / Team B	Yasuyuki Yamaguchi	
33	"Kimi dake ni Chu! Chu! Chu!" / Tentoumu Chu!	Kazuaki Seki	
33	"Seijun Philosophy" / Team 4	Hideaki Fukui	
34	"Suzukake Nanchara"	Ryuhei Kitamura	
34	"Mosh & Dive"	Ryuhei Kitamura	
34	"Party is over"	Eiki Takahashi	
34	"Escape" / SKE48	Takeshi Maruyama	
34	"Kimi to Deatte Boku wa Kawatta" / NMB48	Smith	
34	"Wink wa Sankai" / HKT48	Takatoshi Tsuchiya	
35	"Maeshika Mukanee"	Kumazawa Naoto	
35	"Kinou Yori Motto Suki"	Wataru Saito	
35	"Kimi no Uso wo Shitteita"	Takeshi Maruyama	
35	"Himitsu no Diary"	Takatoshi Tsuchiya	
35	"KONJO"	Smith	
36	"Labrador Retriever"	Tatsuyuki Kobayashi	
36	"Kyou Made no Melody"	Eiki Takahashi	
36	"Kimi wa Kimagure"	Wataru Takeishi	
36	"Itoshiki Rival"	Taikou Nakamura	
36	"B Garden"	Wataru Saito	
36	"Heart no Dasshutsu Game"	Takatoshi Tsuchiya	
37	"Kokoro no Placard"	Tanigawa Eiji	
37	"Dareka ga Nageta Ball"	Wataru Saito	
37	"Hito Natsu no Hankouki"	Smith	
37	"Seikaku ga Warui Onna no Ko"	Wataru Takeishi	
37	"Chewing Gum no Aji Naku Naru Made"	Takatoshi Tsuchiya	
37	"Sailor Zombie"	Taikou Nakamura	
37	"Oshiete Mommy"	Taikou Nakamura	
38	"Kibouteki Refrain"	Hideyuki Tanaka	Graduates Atsuko Maeda, Yuko Oshima, Mariko Shinoda and Tomomi Itano made guest appearances.
38	"Ima, Happy"	Tarou Okagawa	
38	"Ambulance"	Naokazu Mitsuishi	
38	"Utaitai"	Kazuma Ikeda	
38	"Seifuku no Hane"	Eiki Takahashi	
38	"Kaze no Rasen"	Taikou Nakamura	
39	"Green Flash"	Hirokazu Koreeda	
39	"Majisuka Fight"	Musou Matsui	
39	"Haru no Hikari Chikadzuita Natsu"	Tsuyoshi Inoue	
39	"Yankee Rock"	Musou Matsui	
39	"Hakimono to Kasa no Monogatari"	Tetsuo Inoue, Toshiaki Hanzaki	
39	"Sekai ga Naiteru Kara"	Nobuaki Hongou	
39	"Punkish"	Smith	
39	"Aisatsu Kara Hajimeyou"	Takatoshi Tsuchiya	
39	"Otona Ressha"	Eiki Takahashi	
40	"Bokutachi wa Tatakawanai"	Keishi Ōtomo	
40	"Summer side"	Naokazu Mitsuishi	
40	"Bare Bare Bushi"	Tetsuo Inoue	
40	""Danshi" wa Kenkyuu Taishou"	Nobuaki Hongou	
40	"Kafka to Dendenmu Chu!"	Takatoshi Tsuchiya	
40	"Kegarete iru Shinjitsu"	Tsuyoshi Inoue	
40	"Kimi no Dai-ni shou"	Taikou Namakura	
41	"Halloween Night"	Kazuaki Seki	
41	"Sayonara Surfboard"	Takatoshi Tsuchiya	
41	"Mizu no Naka no Dendoritsu"	Naokazu Mitsuishi	
41	"Kimi ni Wedding Dress wo..."	Taikou Nakamura	
41	"Kimi Dake ga Akimeiteita"	Tsuyoshi Inoue	
41	"Ippome Ondo"	Tetsuo Inoue	
41	"Yankee Machine Gun"	Taro Otani, Setsurou Nishihori	
42	"Kuchibiru ni Be My Baby"	Eiki Takahashi	
42	"365 Nichi no Kamihikouki"	Takatoshi Tsuchiya	
42	"Kimi wo Kimi wo Kimi wo..."	Tsuyoshi Inoue	
42	"Madonna no Sentaku"	Wataru Takeishi	
42	"Ama Nojaku Batta"	Inoue Tetsuo	
42	"Senaka Kotoba"	Taikou Nakamura	
42	"Yasashii place"	Nobuaki Hongou	
42	"Oneesan no Hitorigoto"	Ryohei Shinguu	
42	"Kin no Hane wo Motsu Hito yo"	Naokazu Mitsuishi	
42	"Nanka, Chotto, Kyuu ni..."	Nobu Sueyoshi	
43	"Kimi wa Melody"	Mika Ninagawa	
43	"LALALA Message"	Shohei Goto	
43	"Gonna Jump"	Yoshiharu Seri	
43	"Shigamitsuita Seishun"	Takurou Okubo	
43	"Make noise"	Yu-ya HARA	
43	"Max Toki 315-go"	Taikou Nakamura	
43	"Mazariau Mono"	Takeshi Maruyama	
44	"Tsubasa wa Iranai"	Yasuo Baba	Features actor Dori Sakurada again, the first time in 4 years since Gingham Check.
44	"Set Me Free"	Tetsuo Inoue	
44	"Aishuu no Trumpeter"	Naokazu Mitsuishi	
44	"Koi wo Suru to Baka wo Miru"	Takatoshi Tsuchiya	
44	"Kangaeru Hito"	Taikou Nakamura	
44	"Yume e no Route"	Taikou Nakamura	
45	"LOVE TRIP"	Toshitsugu Ono	
45	"Shiawase wo Wakenasai"	Michihiko Yanai	
45	"Hikari to Kage no Hibi"	Taikou Nakamura	
45	"Densetsu no Sakana"	Atsunori Toshi	
45	"Shinka Shitenee Jan"	Yoshiharu Seri	
45	"Kishi ga Mieru Umi Kara"	ZUMI	
45	"2016-nen no Invitation"	Ryohei Shinguu	
45	"Hikari no Naka e"	Naokazu Mitsuishi	
46	"High Tension"	Matsuyama Shigeo	
46	"Osaekirenai Shoudou"	Takatoshi Tsuchiya	
46	"Happy End"	Toshitsugu Ono	
46	"Better"	Naokazu Mitsuishi	
46	"Hoshizora wo Kimi ni"	ZUMI	
46	"Shishunki no Adrenaline"	Taikou Nakamura	
46	"Seijun Tired"	Ryohei Shinguu	
47	"Shoot Sign"	Yoshihiro Mori	
47	"Kidzuka Renai you ni..."	Takahashi Eiki	
47	"Accident Chu"	Nozomi Tanaka	
47	"Vacancy"	tatsuaki	
47	"Mayonaka no Tsuyogari"	Smith	
47	"Tomaranai Kanransha"	Takatoshi Tsuchiya	
47	"Midori to Mori no Undokouen"	Taikou Nakamura	
47	"Dare no Koto wo Ichiban Itoshiteru? / 46Group"	Atsunori Toshi	
48	"Negaigoto no Mochigusare"	Okuma Ryohei	
48	"Ima Para"	ZUMI	
48	"Maebure"	Toshitsugu Ono	
48	"Tenmetsu Pheromone"	Naokazu Mitsuishi	
48	"Ano Koro no Gohyaku Yen Dama"	Shuichi Bamba	
48	"Setouchi no Koe"	Hiroyuki Nakano	
49	"#SukiNanda"	Takahashi Eiki	
49	"Darashinai Aishikata"	Tsuyoshi Taniyama	
49	"Tomadotte Tameratte"	Toshitsugu Ono	
49	"Jibuntachi no Koi ni Kagitte"	Tsuyoshi Inoue	
49	"Tsuki no Kamen"	Nobu Sueyoshi	
49	"Private Summer"	ZUMI	
49	"Give Up wa Shinai"	Yoshiharu Seri	
50	"11gatsu no Anklet"	Fumiko Hirano	
50	"Sayonara de Owaru Wake Janai"	Takahashi Eiki	
50	"Omoidasete Yokatta"	Toshitsugu Ono	
50	"Ikiru Koto ni Nekkyou wo!"	Yoshiharu Seri	
50	"Hohoemi no Toki"	Tomoo Noda	
50	"Yaban na Kyuuai"	Naokazu Mitsuishi	
50	"Hotei Sokudo to Yuuetsukan"	ZUMI	
51	"Jabaja"	YKBX	
51	"Pedal to Sharin to Kita Michi to"	Toshitsugu Ono	
51	"Position"	Nakamura Taikou	
51	"Ai no Moake"	Toshihiro Sonoda	
51	"Hetowoutsu"	Shinichi Kudo	
51	"Buttaoerru Made"	ZUMI	
51	"Tomodachi de Imashou"	Yoshiharu Seri	
51	"Kokkyo no Nai Jidai"	Atsunori Toshi	
52	"Teacher Teacher"	Kei Uehara	
52	"Kimi wa Boku no Kaze"	Yoshiharu Seri	
52	"Romantic Junbichuu"	Mitsunori Yokobori	
52	"Shuuden no Yoru"	Naokazu Mitsuishi	
52	"Atarashii Chime"	Satoshi Kuroda	
52	"Neko Allergy"	ZUMI	
53	"Sentimental Train"	Eiki Takahashi	The winner of the 2018 AKB48 Senbatsu Sousenkyo, Jurina Matsui did not take part in the MV due to ill health, and was replaced with a CGI version in the MV, marking the first time a Sousenkyo winner did not appear in the MV. Matsui eventually shot parts of the MV separately after her return, and her scenes were added to the original MV digitally.
53	"Sandal ja Dekinai Koi"	Yoshiharu Seri	
53	"Tomodachi ja nai ka?"	Nozomi Tanaka	
53	"Aru Hi Fui ni..."	Taikou Nakamura	
53	"Hitonatsu no Dekigoto"	Toshitsugu Ono	
53	"Nami ga Tsutaeru Mono"	Mitsunori Yokobori	
53	""Suki" no Tane"	ZUMI	
54	"No Way Man"	Seiichi Hishikawa	
54	"Ike no Mizu wo Nukitai"	Yoshiharu Seri	
54	"Wakariyasukute Gomen"	Taikou Nakamura	
54	"Soredemo Kanojo wa"	Naokazu Mitsuishi	
54	"Ohayo Kara Hajimaru Sekai"	Toshitsugu Ono	
54	"Saikyou Twintail"	Fujimaru Totsuka	
54	"Yume e no Process"	Shin Okawa	
55	"Jiwaru Days"	Cezan Iseda	
55	"Watashi Datte Idol!"	ZUMI	
55	"Generation Change"	Toshitsugu Ono	
55	"Hatsukoi Door"	Atsunori Toshi	
56	"Sustainable"	Eiki Takahashi	
56	"Sukida Sukida Sukida"	Toshitsugu Ono	
56	"Seishun Da Capo"	Naokazu Mitsuishi	
56	"Monica, Yoake da"	Fujimaru Totsuka	
57	"Shitsuren, Arigatō"	Cezan Iseda	
57	"Mata Aeru Hi Made"	Toshitsugu Ono	
57	"Omoide My Friend"	Fujimaru Totsuka	
57	"Jitabata"	ZUMI	
58	"Nemohamo Rumor"	Takeshi Tomohisa	
58	"Hanareteitemo"	Dai Isomi	Graduates Atsuko Maeda, Yuko Oshima, Haruna Kojima, Tomomi Itano, Minami Takahashi, Mariko Shinoda, Rino Sashihara and Sayaka Yamamoto, as well as SKE48 member Jurina Matsui, made guest appearances
58	"Kimi ga Inaku Naru 12gatsu" / Yui Yokoyama	Yui Yokoyama	
58	"Moto Kare Desu"	Minoru Fujimoto	
58	"Kowasanakya Ikenai Mono" / Nana Okada		

== Feature films ==
- Densen Uta (2007)
- Mijyoubutsu Hyaku Monogatari (2021)

== TV series ==
- Japanorama Season 2, episode 2.
- Majisuka Gakuen (マジすか学園, "Serious High School") (TV Tokyo) (2010.01.08–2010.03.26)
- Sakura Kara no Tegami: AKB48 Sorezore no Sotsugyo Monogatari (桜からの手紙 〜AKB48 それぞれの卒業物語〜, Letters from Cherry Blossoms ~AKB48 Graduation Stories~) (NTV) (2011.02.26–2011.03.06)
- Shiritsu Bakaleya Kōkō (私立バカレア高校) (NTV) (2012.04.14–2012.06.30)
- Majisuka Gakuen 2 (マジすか学園2) (TV Tokyo) (2011.04.15–2011.07.01)
- Majisuka Gakuen 3 (マジすか学園3) (TV Tokyo) (2012.07.13–2012.10.05)
- So long! (NTV) (2013.02.11–2013.02.13)
- Wanda × AKB48 Short Story: Fortune Cookie (Fuji TV) (2013.07.07)
- Majisuka Gakuen 4 (マジすか学園4) (NTV) (2015.01.19–2015.3.30)
- Majisuka Gakuen 5 (マジすか学園5) (NTV and Hulu Japan) (2015.08.25–2015.10.27) (Note: The first and second episodes premiered on NTV. The rest of the episode is streaming on Hulu Japan.)
- AKB Horror Night: Adrenaline no Yoru (Asahi TV and au Video Pass) (2015.10.08-2016.03.03)
- AKB Love Night: Koi Kōjo (Asahi TV and au Video Pass) (2016.04.21-2016.09.15)
- Kyabasuka Gakuen
- Tōfu Pro Wrestling (Asahi TV) (2017.01.22-2017.07.02)
- Majimuri Gakuen
- AKB48 no Uta

== TV shows ==
Year	Show	Network	Format	Notes
2007–2009	AKB48+10!	Sky PerfecTV!	24ep x 60m	–
2008	AKB1:59! (AKB1じ59ふん!, AKB1ji59fun!)	Nihon TV	10ep x 30m	–
2008	AKB0:59! (AKB0じ59ふん!, AKB0ji59fun!)	Nihon TV	26ep x 30m	–
2008–2019	AKBingo!	Nippon TV	30m weekly	560 episodes (last episode: September 24, 2019)
2008–present	AKB48 Nemousu TV (AKB48ネ申テレビ)	Family Gekijo	11ep x 30m	33+ seasons + specials
2009–2012	Shukan AKB (週刊AKB; Weekly AKB)	TV Tokyo	30m weekly	–
2009–2010	AKB1/48	Sky PerfecTV!	8ep x 30m	–
2010–2016	Ariyoshi AKB Kyōwakoku (有吉AKB共和国; Ariyoshi AKB Republic)	TBS	30m weekly	with Hiroiki Ariyoshi
2010–2011	AKB-Kyu Gourmet Stadium (AKB-級グルメスタジアム; AKB-Class Gourmet Stadium)	Sukachan	6ep x 45m	2 seasons
2010	AKB600sec.	Nihon TV	16ep x 15m	–
2010–2016	AKB to chome chome! (AKBと××!; AKB and xx!)	Yomiuri TV	60m	monthly + specials and extras
2011	Akemashite AKB! (あけましてAKB!)	Nihon TV	1ep	–
2011	Mou hitotsu no AKB48 – "1 Miri Saki no Mirai" (もうひとつのAKB48ドキュメンタリー「1ミリ先の未来」, Another AKB48 Documentary – "Future in 1 millimeters ahead")	NHK General TV	1ep	–
2011-2012	Hikari TV presents AKB48 Konto "Bimyo~" (『ひかりTV presents AKB48コント「びみょ〜」』)	Hikari TV Channel	20ep	–
2013–2019	AKB48 SHOW!	NHK BS Premium	30m weekly	The show ended on March 24, 2019, after 216 episodes.
2013–2017	AKB48 Kankō Taishi (AKB観光大使)	FujiTV ONE	60min, once a month	–
2018	Produce 48	Mnet	12ep	Culminated in the formation of K-pop group IZ*ONE
2021	AKBINGO! NEO	Nippon TV	3ep x 60m	One-time special revival of AKBINGO!. Participating members for each episode were chosen via the mobile phone game AKB48 no Dobbon! Hitori Jime; Originally planned for 1 episode, more episodes were subsequently added due to popular demand
2021	Nogizaka ni, Kosaremashita ~ AKB48, Iroiro Atte Teretou Kara no Daigyakushu~ (乃木坂に、越されました～AKB48、色々あってテレ東からの大逆襲)	TV Tokyo	13ep x 30m	58th single senbatsu announcement on the first episode. Suspended on September 29, 2021, due to the COVID-19 pandemic After a 3-month hiatus, the show was subsequently renamed to AKB48, Saikin Kiita?
2022–	AKB48, Saikin Kiita? ~Isshoni Nanka Yatte Mimasenka? (AKB48、最近聞いた？～一緒になんかやってみませんか？)	TV Tokyo	30m weekly	Revival of Nogizaka ni, Kosaremashita after a 3-month hiatus
2022–2023	AKB48 Sayonara Mouri San (AKB48サヨナラ毛利さん)	Nippon TV	30m weekly	Revival of AKBINGO!
2023	OUT OF 48	Nippon TV	weekly	

== Web dramas ==
- Suzuki Wagon R presents Kissa Versailles (2007.3.14–5.7)

All AKB48 old Team K members appear; former member Ayumi Orii as a star.

- AKB48 Sōsenkyo Scandal: Akiba Bunshō on Amazon Prime Video, 5 episodes (2016.6.19 onwards)
- Crow's Blood on Hulu Japan, 6 episodes (2016.7.23 onwards)

== Video games ==
- AKB 1/48 Idol to Koi Shitara… (AKB1/48 アイドルと恋したら…) (PSP), a dating simulation game.
- AKB 1/48 Idol to Guam de Koi Shitara… (AKB1/48 アイドルとグアムで恋したら…) (PSP), a sequel to the previous dating simulation game. It is set on the island of Guam.
- AKB48 Stage Fighter (Smartphone)
- AKB48 Trading Card Game & Collection (AR Card Game)
- AKB48 + Me (Nintendo 3DS)
- AKB1/149 Renai Sousenkyo (AKB1/149恋愛総選挙) (PSP, PSV and PS3), a sequel to the two previous dating sims that features all the AKB, SKE, NMB and HKT members.
- AKB48 no Yabou (AKB48の野望) (Smartphone, PC)
- Sailor Zombie AKB48 Arcade Edition (Arcade)
- AKB48 Office Music Game (Smartphone)
- AiKaBu (Smartphone)
- AKB48 Stage Fighter 2 Battle Festival (Smartphone)
- AKB48 Dice Caravan (Smartphone)
- Arcana no Himitsu (アルカナの秘密) (Smartphone)
- AKB48 Beat Carnival (Smartphone)
- AKB48 Cherry Bay Blaze (Smartphone)
- AKB48 no Dobbon! Hitori Jime! (AKB48のどっぼーん！ひとりじめ！) (Smartphone)
- AKB48 WORLD (Smartphone)
