= Horror Collector =

Japanese horror children's novel series

- First novel volume cover

恐怖コレクター (Kyōfu Korekutā)
- Genre: Horror, mystery
- Novel series
- Written by: Norio Tsuruta; Midori Sato
- Illustrated by: Yon
- Published by: Kadokawa Shoten
- English publisher: NA: Yen Press
- Imprint: Kadokawa Tsubasa Bunko
- Original run: June 15, 2015 – present
- Volumes: 28
- Manga
- Written by: Norio Tsuruta; Midori Sato
- Illustrated by: Niko Yūki
- Published by: Media Factory
- English publisher: NA: Yen Press
- Imprint: MF Comics Gene Series
- Magazine: Monthly Comic Gene
- Original run: September 15, 2021 – February 15, 2022
- Volumes: 1
- Anime television series
- Directed by: Yuki Inaba
- Written by: Yuki Inaba
- Music by: Masato Kōda
- Studio: Studio Palette
- Licensed by: Crunchyroll
- Original network: NHK General TV
- Original run: October 10, 2026 – present
- Episodes: 12
- icon

Horror Collector (Japanese: 恐怖コレクター, Hepburn: Kyōfu Korekutā) is a Japanese horror children's novel series written by Norio Tsuruta and Midori Sato and illustrated by Yon. It began publication under Kadokawa Shoten's Kadokawa Tsubasa Bunko imprint in June 2015, with 28 volumes released as of May 2026. A manga adaptation illustrated by Niko Yūki was serialized in Media Factory's Monthly Comic Gene magazine from September 2021 to February 2022. An anime television series adaptation produced by Studio Palette premiered in October 2026.

== Premise ==
Fushigi Chino, a boy with an interest in Japanese urban legends, travels around the country to investigate them. He is searching for Himitsu, his twin sister who has the ability to manifest the supernatural. Traveling with Jimmy, a photographer who was turned into a dog, Fushigi aims to find Himitsu and find out the truth behind various supernatural phenomena taking place in Japan.

== Characters ==
Fushigi Chino (千野 フシギ, Chino Fushigi)
Voiced by: Hiiro Ishibashi (Japanese); Brandon Allan Majella (English)
A boy who wears a red hood, who is interested in urban legends.
Jimmy (ジミー, Jimī)
Voiced by: Jun Fukuyama (Japanese); Larry Brantley (English)
Fushigi's partner. He was a photographer who was turned into a dog following an incident, although he retains a human face.
Himitsu Chino (千野 ヒミツ, Chino Himitsu)
Voiced by: Saori Hayami (Japanese); Rebecca Danae (English)
Fushigi's twin sister, who wears a black hood. She has the ability to manifest the supernatural.
Blue Umbrella Man (青い傘の男, Aoi Kasa no Otoko)
Voiced by: Nobuhiko Okamoto
Momo
Voiced by: Sae Hiratsuka
Raita (雷太)
Voiced by: Ryōta Ōsaka (Japanese); Jonathan Lim (English)
Sachiko Konno (紺野 沙知子, Konno Sachiko)
Voiced by: Hana Hishikawa
Shota Togawa (戸川翔太, Togawa Shōta)
Voiced by: Daiki Yamashita
Rima (リマ)
Voiced by: Yuka Iguchi
Umi Kamijo (上条海, Kamijō Umi)
Voiced by: Akari Kito

== Media ==
=== Novels ===
The series is written by Norio Tsuruta, a film director known for his work in horror and has been described as the "Father of J-Horror", and Midori Sato, who is active as a screenwriter. The novels are illustrated by Yon. The first volume was published by Kadokawa Shoten under their Kadokawa Tsubasa Bunko imprint on June 15, 2015; 28 volumes have been released as of May 13, 2026. The series has also been released in English by Yen Press and in Korean.

=== Manga ===
A manga adaptation illustrated by Niko Yūki was serialized in Media Factory's Monthly Comic Gene magazine from September 15, 2021, to February 15, 2022. The series' chapters were compiled into a single tankōbon volume released on March 26, 2022. The manga adaptation is also licensed in English by Yen Press.

=== Stage play ===
A stage play adaptation written and directed by Masafumi Hata was staged at the Sogestu Hall in Tokyo from May 13 to 21, 2023.

=== Anime ===
An anime television series adaptation was announced on December 5, 2025. The series is produced by Studio Palette and directed and written by Yuki Inaba, with Kaori Yoshikawa designing the characters and Masato Kōda composing the music. It premiered on NHK General TV on October 10, 2026, and will run for 12 episodes. The opening theme song is "Kageboshi" (カゲボウシ; 'Silhouette'), and the ending theme song is "Meiro" (迷路; 'Maze'), both performed by Shikao Suga. Crunchyroll streams the series. An English dub was released on October 24, 2026.

== Reception ==
By October 2025, the series had over 1 million copies in circulation.
