= You Were Experienced, I Was Not: Our Dating Story =

Japanese light novel series

- First light novel volume cover

経験済みなキミと、経験ゼロなオレが、お付き合いする話。 (Keikenzumi na Kimi to, Keiken Zero na Ore ga, Otsukiai Suru Hanashi)
- Genre: Romantic comedy
- Light novel
- Written by: Makiko Nagaoka
- Illustrated by: magako
- Published by: Fujimi Shobo
- English publisher: NA: J-Novel Club
- Imprint: Fujimi Fantasia Bunko
- Original run: September 19, 2020 – March 19, 2025
- Volumes: 10 (Note: + 1 short stories collection)
- Manga
- Written by: Makiko Nagaoka
- Illustrated by: Noyama Carpaccio
- Published by: Square Enix
- English publisher: NA: Square Enix
- Magazine: Gangan Online
- Original run: February 23, 2022 – present
- Volumes: 11
- Anime television series

Our Dating Story: The Experienced You and the Inexperienced Me
- Directed by: Hideaki Ōba
- Written by: Hiroko Fukuda
- Music by: Kei Haneoka
- Studio: ENGI
- Licensed by: Crunchyroll: SA/SEA: Muse Communication
- Original network: AT-X, Tokyo MX, BS11, SUN, KBS Kyoto
- Original run: October 6, 2023 – December 22, 2023
- Episodes: 12
- icon

You Were Experienced, I Was Not: Our Dating Story, (Note: Japanese: 経験済みなキミと、経験ゼロなオレが、お付き合いする話。, Hepburn: Keikenzumi na Kimi to, Keiken Zero na Ore ga, Otsukiai Suru Hanashi, lit. "Experienced You and Zero-Experience Me, Our Dating Story") also known as KimiZero (キミゼロ) for short, is a Japanese light novel series written by Makiko Nagaoka and illustrated by magako. The series published ten volumes under Fujimi Shobo's Fujimi Fantasia Bunko imprint from September 2020 to March 2025. A manga adaptation by Noyama Carpaccio began serialization in Square Enix's Gangan Online web service in February 2022. An anime television series adaptation produced by ENGI aired from October to December 2023.

== Premise ==
As a punishment for losing a game, Ryūto Kashima, a gloomy high school boy, is forced to confess his love to Runa Shirakawa, a beautiful girl who is at the top of the school pecking order and admired by everyone. The two end up going out simply because Runa happened to not be in a relationship. After Ryūto asks her out, Runa brings him to her room, where they discover that they have drastically different ideas of how they should date. The two are different in just about everything, from their friends, to personalities and hobbies. Nevertheless, they surprise each other by their differences every day, learn to accept the other for who they are, and gradually connect with each other.

== Characters ==
Ryūto Kashima (加島 龍斗, Kashima Ryūto)
Voiced by: Natsuki Hanae
A gloomy second-year high school boy. He has never had a girlfriend, does not have many friends, and his only hobby is watching live streams on the Internet. Initially, he had a crush on Maria Kurose, but following her rejection, he finds himself falling in love with Runa Shirakawa, a beautiful and popular girl admired by everyone in school. As a punishment for losing a game, he confesses his feelings to Runa in person, and to his surprise, she agrees to date him.
Runa Shirakawa (白河 月愛, Shirakawa Runa)
Voiced by: Momo Asakura (PV), Saori Ōnishi (anime)
A gyaru who is at the top of the school caste and is considered to be the most beautiful girl in her grade. She is bright, cheerful, can approach anyone without hesitation, and has dated many boys before. After Ryūto confesses to her, she accepts his confession and starts going out with him. Even though she has experience in dating, she still worries that their relationship might not last long.
Maria Kurose (黒瀬 海愛, Kurose Maria)
Voiced by: Aoi Koga
Ryūto's first crush and Runa's fraternal twin sister, but they grew up separately after their parents divorced when they were in the fifth grade. Though she initially rejected Ryūto's previous confession, she is jealous of her sister's charisma and popularity, including her relationship with him.
Nikoru Yamana (山名 笑琉, Yamana Nikoru)
Voiced by: Ayaka Fukuhara
One of Runa's friends and also a gyaru. In the anime's official English translation, her name is given as Nicole.
Akari Tanikita (谷北 朱璃, Tanikita Akari)
Voiced by: Tomori Kusunoki
A friend of Runa.
Yūsuke Ijichi (伊地知 祐輔, Ijichi Yūsuke)
Voiced by: Fukushi Ochiai
A friend of Ryūto.
Ren Nishina (仁志名 蓮, Nishina Ren)
Voiced by: Daisuke Sakaguchi
A friend of Ryūto.
Shūgo Sekiya (関家 柊吾, Sekiya Shūgo)
Voiced by: Tomoaki Maeno
A college student who reveals to be Nikoru's ex-boyfriend. He only dated Nikoru two weeks before dumping her.
Ken
Voiced by: Kun
A popular online streamer who Ryuto and his friends are fans of.

== Media ==
=== Light novels ===
Written by Makiko Nagaoka with illustrations by magako, the series began publication under Fujimi Shobo's Fujimi Fantasia Bunko imprint on September 19, 2020. A promotional video was released on Kadokawa's official YouTube channel on July 15, 2021, to promote the series, featuring Momo Asakura as Runa Shirakawa. The series ended with the release of its tenth volume in March 2025.

In September 2023, J-Novel Club announced that they licensed the novels for English publication.

No.	Original release date	Original ISBN	English release date	English ISBN
1	September 19, 2020	978-4-04-073809-3	December 8, 2023	978-1-7183-0974-6
2	March 19, 2021	978-4-04-073993-9	February 22, 2024	978-1-7183-0976-0
3	September 18, 2021	978-4-04-074213-7	May 9, 2024	978-1-7183-0978-4
4	February 19, 2022	978-4-04-074286-1	August 1, 2024	978-1-7183-0980-7
5	September 16, 2022	978-4-04-074539-8	October 24, 2024	978-1-7183-0982-1
6	March 17, 2023	978-4-04-074540-4	January 23, 2025	978-1-7183-0984-5
7	September 20, 2023	978-4-04-075011-8	May 22, 2025	978-1-7183-0986-9
SS	March 19, 2024	978-4-04-075337-9	—	—
8	June 20, 2024	978-4-04-075012-5	September 2, 2025	978-1-7183-0988-3
9	February 20, 2025	978-4-04-075724-7	October 1, 2026	978-1-7183-0990-6
10	March 19, 2025	978-4-04-075725-4	January 5, 2027	978-1-7183-0992-0

=== Manga ===
A manga adaptation illustrated by Noyama Carpaccio began serialization in Square Enix's Gangan Online web service on February 23, 2022. As of November 2026, eleven tankōbon volumes have been released. In June 2023, Square Enix began to publish the series in English on their Manga UP! Global service.

No.	Release date	ISBN
1	September 12, 2022	978-4-7575-8145-6
2	November 11, 2022	978-4-7575-8258-3
3	April 12, 2023	978-4-7575-8527-0
4	October 12, 2023	978-4-7575-8855-4
5	March 12, 2024	978-4-7575-9103-5
6	August 9, 2024	978-4-7575-9355-8
7	January 10, 2025	978-4-7575-9614-6
8	July 11, 2025	978-4-7575-9894-2
9	January 9, 2026	978-4-301-00278-9
10	June 11, 2026	978-4-301-00581-0
11	November 12, 2026	978-4-301-00882-8

=== Anime ===
On September 9, 2022, an anime television series adaptation was announced. The anime is produced by ENGI and directed by Hideaki Ōba, with Hiroko Fukuda overseeing series' scripts, Yosuke Itō designing the characters, and Kei Haneoka composing the music. It aired from October 6 to December 22, 2023, on AT-X and other networks. The opening theme song is "Love You Tender!" (ラブ・ユー・テンダー！) by Maaya Uchida, while the ending theme song is "Aikotoba" (あいことば) by rock band AliA. Crunchyroll licensed the series under the title Our Dating Story: The Experienced You and the Inexperienced Me. Muse Communication licensed the series in Southeast Asia.

No.	Title	Directed by	Written by	Storyboarded by	Original release date
1	"Our Confession Story: The Experienced You and the Inexperienced Me"; Transliteration: "Keikenzumi na Kimi ni, Keiken Zero na Ore ga, Kokuhaku Suru Hanashi" (Japanese: 経験済みなキミに、経験ゼロなオレが、告白する話。)	Hideaki Ōba	Hiroko Fukuda	Hideaki Ōba	October 6, 2023
2	"Our First Date Story: The Experienced You and the Inexperienced Me"; Transliteration: "Keikenzumi na Kimi to, Keiken Zero na Ore ga, Hatsu Dēto Suru Hanashi" (Japanese: 経験済みなキミと、経験ゼロなオレが、初デートする話。)	Shin'ichi Fukumoto	Hiroko Fukuda	Sōta Yokote	October 13, 2023
3	"My Surprise For You Story: The Experienced You and the Inexperienced Me"; Transliteration: "Keikenzumi na Kimi ni, Keiken Zero na Ore ga, Sapuraizu Suru Hanashi" (Japanese: 経験済みなキミに、経験ゼロなオレが、サプライズする話。)	Kentarō Mizuno	Hiroaki Nagashima	Shinichi Watanabe	October 20, 2023
4	"Our Jealousy Story: The Inexperienced You Gets Jealous of the Experienced You"; Transliteration: "Keikenzumi na Kimi ni, Keiken Zero na Kimi ga, Shitto Suru Hanashi" (Japanese: 経験済みなキミに、経験ゼロなキミが、嫉妬する話。)	Hideaki Ōba	Hiroko Fukuda	Hideaki Ōba	October 27, 2023
5	"Our Dating Story: The Inexperienced Me Spends the Night with the Experienced You"; Transliteration: "Keikenzumi na Kimi to, Keiken Zero na Ore ga, Otomari Suru Hanashi" (Japanese: 経験済みなキミと、経験ゼロなオレが、お泊まりする話。)	Yūtarō Hoshino	Hiroaki Nagashima	Yūtarō Hoshino	November 3, 2023
6	"Our Cheating Story: The Experienced You Cheats with an Experienced Someone Else?"; Transliteration: "Keikenzumi na Kimi ga, Keikenzumi na Dareka to, Uwaki Suru Hanashi?" (Japanese: 経験済みなキミが、経験済みな誰かと、浮気する話？)	Maki Itō	Takayo Ikami	Naoki Hishikawa	November 10, 2023
7	"Our Festival Story: The Experienced You and the Inexperienced Me Go to a Summer Festival"; Transliteration: "Keikenzumi na Kimi to, Keiken Zero na Ore ga, Natsumatsuri ni Iku Hanashi" (Japanese: 経験済みなキミと、経験ゼロなオレが、夏まつりに行く話。)	Shin'ichi Fukumoto	Hiroko Fukuda	Hideaki Ōba; Hiroyuki Kōbe	November 17, 2023
8	"Our Survival Story: The Experienced You and the Inexperienced Us Play Survival Games"; Transliteration: "Keikenzumi na Kimi to, Keiken Zero na Oretachi ga, Sabagē Suru Hanashi" (Japanese: 経験済みなキミと、経験ゼロなオレたちが、サバゲーする話。)	Takahiro Hirata	Hiroaki Nagashima	Megumi Yamamoto	November 24, 2023
9	"Our Running Story: The Experienced You and the Inexperienced Me Run Together"; Transliteration: "Keikenzumi na Kimi to, Keiken Zero na Ore ga, Issho ni Hashiru Hanashi" (Japanese: 経験済みなキミと、経験ゼロなオレが、いっしょに走る話。)	Hiroyuki Kanbe	Takayo Ikami	Shinichi Watanabe	December 1, 2023
10	"Our Different Story: The Experienced You and the Inexperienced Me Go Different Ways"; Transliteration: "Keikenzumi na Kimi to, Keiken Zero na Ore ga, Surechigau Hanashi" (Japanese: 経験済みなキミと、経験ゼロなオレが、すれちがう話。)	Shin'ichi Fukumoto	Takayo Ikami	Atsuko Tonomizu	December 8, 2023
11	"Our Breakup Story: The Experienced You and the Inexperienced Me Break Up"; Transliteration: "Keikenzumi na Kimi to, Keiken Zero na Ore ga, Owakare Suru Hanashi" (Japanese: 経験済みなキミと、経験ゼロなオレが、お別れする話。)	Hideaki Ōba	Hiroko Fukuda	Hideaki Ōba	December 15, 2023
12	"Our Experience Story: The Experienced You and the Inexperienced Me Get Experienced"; Transliteration: "Keikenzumi na Kimi to, Keiken Zero na Ore ga, Keiken Suru Hanashi" (Japanese: 経験済みなキミと、経験ゼロなオレが、経験する話。)	Akira Ishii	Hiroko Fukuda	Shinichi Watanabe	December 22, 2023

== Reception ==
The series both the anime and manga adaptation as well as the light novel received mixed reviews from various critics.

Caitlin Moore wrote that the anime is somehow both "ambitious" and "completely lacking in ambition". She noted that the concepts are "nice on paper", but the execution was "lacking", noting that both Ryuto and Runa have a "personality of wallpaper paste". She adds that the series is openly about sex. Still, the protagonists have "very little chemistry outside of a couple of scenes" and writers try to "inject some tawdry drama" by inserting a love triangle between Runa and Maria. She concluded that the anime was "fine".

Sean Gaffney of A Case Suitable for Treatment praises the first volume of the light novel for sticking to its theme of "slut-shaming is bad" but noted that the couple's progression is the "least interesting part of the series so far" noting that "Just because you're not having sex doesn't mean that hand-holding should take 60 pages."
