= Okama (artist) =

Japanese manga artist and illustrator (born 1974)

Okama is a Japanese manga artist and illustrator. He is known as the artist of Cloth Road as well as the original character designer for Himawari and Glass no Kantai. He was also involved in Gunbuster 2, most noticeably in the ending design.

Okama began his career by publishing various dōjin works (usually hentai themed), and made his debut in the professional world in 1998, with most of his early work also being hentai erotica themed. In late 1999, he began his first non-adult orientated serialization Cat's World.

Okama also means a gay, effeminate or female-presenting man. The artist's explanation for his name is that he always plays female characters in online games.

== Works ==
=== Anime ===
- Kamichu! (production design)
- Glass no Kantai (original character design)
- The Wings of Rean (visual concept)
- Le Portrait de Petite Cossette (production design)
- Genesis of Aquarion (concept design)
- Diebuster (future visual)
- Himawari! (original character design, production design)
- Getsumen to Heiki Mina (character design)
- Saint October (original character design)
- Rebuild of Evangelion (design)
- Welcome to the Space Show (production design)
- Lotte no Omocha! (world visual design)
- Senki Zesshō Symphogear (creature design)

=== Printed works ===
- Artbooks
  - Okamax
  - Getsumen Toheiki Mina Calendar
  - okamarble
  - Food Girls
- Manga
  - Cat's World
  - Cloth Road
  - Food Girls
  - Our Last Crusade or the Rise of a New World
  - Tail Star
- Hentai manga
  - Hanafuda
  - School
  - Meguri Kuru Haru
- Contributions
  - Range Murata - Robot - Volume 01
  - Range Murata - Robot - Volume 03
  - Range Murata - Robot - Volume 04
  - Range Murata - Robot - Volume 10

=== Games ===
- No More Heroes (Costume Designer)
- Busou Shinki (Designer for Zyrdarya and Juvisy)

=== Software ===
- Vocaloid Nekomura Iroha (character design and illustration)
