= The Reincarnated Elf Left on a Journey to Master His Magic =

Japanese web novel series

- Light novel volume cover

魔術を極めて旅に出た転生エルフ、持て余した寿命で生ける伝説となる (Majutsu o Kiwamete Tabi ni Deta Tensei Erufu, Moteamashita Jumyō de Ikeru Densetsu to Naru)
- Genre: Isekai
- Novel series
- Written by: Monsho Sakakibara
- Published by: Kakuyomu
- Original run: July 24, 2021 – present
- Light novel

Tensei Elf ni Yoru 900-Nen no Yūkyū Slow Life
- Written by: Monsho Sakakibara
- Illustrated by: Hatori Kyoka
- Published by: Starts Publishing
- Imprint: Grast Novels
- Published: December 22, 2022
- Volumes: 1
- Manga
- Written by: Monsho Sakakibara
- Illustrated by: Kanco
- Published by: Starts Publishing
- Imprint: Grast Comics
- Magazine: Comic Grast
- Original run: May 12, 2023 – present
- Volumes: 6
- Anime television series
- Directed by: Yuki Inaba
- Written by: Yuki Inaba
- Music by: Kenichi Takano; Jun Ichikawa
- Studio: Studio Palette
- Original network: Tokyo MX, BS Fuji, HBC, CBC, RCC, itv, RKB
- Original run: January 6, 2027 – scheduled
- icon

The Reincarnated Elf Left on a Journey to Master His Magic (Japanese: 魔術を極めて旅に出た転生エルフ、持て余した寿命で生ける伝説となる, Hepburn: Majutsu o Kiwamete Tabi ni Deta Tensei Erufu, Moteamashita Jumyō de Ikeru Densetsu to Naru) is a Japanese web novel series written by Monsho Sakakibara. It began serialization Kadokawa Corporation's Kakuyomu online service in July 2021. It was later published as a light novel under Starts Publishing's Grast Novels imprint in December 2022, featuring illustrations by Hatori Kyoka. A manga adaptation illustrated by Kanco began serialization in Starts Publishing's Comic Grast online magazine in May 2023, and has been compiled into six volumes as of June 2026. An anime television series adaptation produced by Studio Palette is set to premiere in January 2027.

== Plot ==
Minoru Kido, a 30-year-old salaryman, is killed in a traffic accident. He is reincarnated into another world as an elf named Liese Klein. In this new world, elves have a lifespan of up to a thousand years. However, he becomes bored of staying at home, still retaining memories of the time before his death. Wanting to experience a fulfilling life, in contrast to his previous short life, he decides to leave home, much to his family's hesitation. However, after the local village chief appears, challenging him to reach his full magic potential within a hundred years, he sets off on his journey.

== Characters ==
Liese Klein (リース・クライン, Rīsu Kurain)
Voiced by: Daiki Yamashita
In his previous life, he was Minoru Kido (木戸 稔, Kido Minoru), a 30-year-old salaryman who was killed while crossing the street. Being thankful for his second chance at life, he spent his days studying and improving his magic skills. He lives with his family in a village of elves, having born into a race known for its long lifespans. Upon setting off on his journey, his powers grow so strong that he impresses the village chief. After hearing rumors that the Demon Lord has been resurrected, he aims to defeat him, wanting to leave his mark on this world.
Minori (ミノリ)
Voiced by: Hana Hishikawa
A human girl that Liese encountered during his journey. As she was originally nameless, she is given the name Minori.
Jin (ジン)
An adventurer who serves as Liese's apprentice.
Rahab (ラハブ, Rahabu)
Voiced by: Haruka Terui
Grillet (グリエ, Gurie)
Voiced by: Nobuyuki Hiyama
Gallius (ガリウス, Gariusu)
Voiced by: Hiro Shimono
Slypha (シルファ, Shirufa)
Voiced by: Megumi Ogata

== Media ==
=== Light novel ===
Monsho Sakakibara originally began posting the series as a web novel on Kadokawa Corporation's Kakuyomu online service on July 24, 2021. It was later published as a light novel under the title Tensei Elf ni Yoru 900-Nen no Yūkyū Slow Life (転生エルフによる900年の悠久スローライフ～全属性魔法と古代魔術を100年で極めたので、残りの人生は気楽に謳歌します～, Tensei Erufu ni Yoru 900-nen no Yūkyū Surōraifu: Zen Zokusei Mahō to Kodai Majutsu o 100-nen de Kiwametanode, Nokori no Jinsei wa Kiraku ni Ōkashimasu); a single volume featuring illustrations by Hatori Kyoka was released under Starts Publishing's Grast Novels imprint on December 22, 2022.

No.	Japanese release date	Japanese ISBN
1	December 22, 2022	978-4-81-379195-9

=== Manga ===
A manga adaptation illustrated by Kanco began serialization in Starts Publishing's Comic Grast online magazine on May 12, 2023; the series' chapters are also released on the Novema online service. Six tankōbon volumes have been released as of June 26, 2026.

No.	Japanese release date	Japanese ISBN
1	March 22, 2024	978-4-81-376297-3
2	May 23, 2024	978-4-81-376317-8
3	November 22, 2024	978-4-81-376383-3
4	May 23, 2025	978-4-81-376450-2
5	November 28, 2025	978-4-81-376527-1
6	June 26, 2026	978-4-81-376620-9

=== Anime ===
An anime television series adaptation was announced on November 19, 2025. The series will be produced by Studio Palette and directed and written by Yuki Inaba, with Kaori Yoshikawa designing the characters and Kenichi Takano and Jun Ichikawa composing the music. It is set to premiere on January 6, 2027, on Tokyo MX and other networks. (Note: Both Abema and dAnime Store will early stream on December 30, 2026, a week before airing.) The opening theme song is "Breath", performed by ao, and the ending theme song is "Ja Mata, Raise de Mo" (じゃあまた、来世でも; lit. 'See You Later, in the Afterlife'), performed by moon drop.
