= Demon Lord 2099 =

Japanese light novel series by Daigo Murasaki and Kureta

- First light novel volume cover

魔王2099 (Maō 2099)
- Genre: Cyberpunk; Reverse isekai; Science fantasy
- Light novel
- Written by: Daigo Murasaki
- Illustrated by: Kureta
- Published by: Fujimi Shobo
- English publisher: NA: Yen Press
- Imprint: Fujimi Fantasia Bunko
- Original run: January 20, 2021 – present
- Volumes: 5
- Manga
- Written by: Daigo Murasaki
- Illustrated by: Kiiro Akashiro
- Published by: Kadokawa Shoten
- Magazine: Shōnen Ace Plus
- Original run: November 5, 2021 – June 24, 2022
- Manga
- Written by: Daigo Murasaki
- Illustrated by: Yutaka Sakurai
- Published by: Kadokawa Shoten
- English publisher: NA: Yen Press
- Magazine: Shōnen Ace Plus
- Original run: March 22, 2023 – August 7, 2024
- Volumes: 3
- Anime television series
- Directed by: Ryō Andō
- Written by: Yūichirō Momose
- Music by: Tatsuya Kato
- Studio: J.C.Staff
- Licensed by: Crunchyroll (streaming); SEA: Muse Communication
- Original network: Tokyo MX, GTV, GYT, BS11, MBS, Chukyo TV, AT-X
- Original run: October 13, 2024 – December 29, 2024
- Episodes: 12
- icon

Demon Lord 2099 (Japanese: 魔王2099, Hepburn: Maō 2099) is a Japanese light novel series written by Daigo Murasaki and illustrated by Kureta. The series began publication by Fujimi Shobo under their Fujimi Fantasia Bunko imprint in January 2021. The light novel series has been licensed in English by Yen Press. A manga adaptation by Kiiro Akashiro was serialized online on Kadokawa Shoten's Shōnen Ace Plus from November 2021 to June 2022. A second manga adaptation by Yutaka Sakurai was serialized on the same website from March 2023 to August 2024. An anime television series adaptation produced by J.C.Staff aired from October to December 2024.

The story revolves around an evil demon lord from a magical world who is defeated in battle and put to sleep for 500 years. When he wakes up, he discovers his world has merged with Earth. The plot thus takes place in Earth in the year 2099, where magic has merged with engineering and Earth has become a fantasy cyberpunk world.

== Plot ==
In the magical fantasy world of Alneath, the villainous Demon Lord Veltol Velvet Velsvalt was slain in battle by the hero Gram. 500 years later, his subordinate Machina Soleige uses magic to revive Veltol. During his time away however, Alneath underwent a catastrophe known as the "Fantasion" when it merged with the industrial world of Earth in the year 2023. This resulted in prejudice between various races, the collapse of national boundaries, and wars between newly established city states. After the wars, relative peace broke out, and Alneath's magic was combined with Earth's industry to create magical engineering known as "magineering". Veltol is revived in the year 2099 in the city state of Shinjuku (formerly Tokyo), and together with Machina and her hacker friend Takahashi, he attempts to regain his power and once again attempt world domination.

== Characters ==
Veltol Velvet Velsvalt (ベルトール=ベルベット・ベールシュバルト, Berutōru Berubetto Bērushubaruto)
Voiced by: Satoshi Hino (Japanese); Ian Sinclair (English)
Veltol is a villainous immortal demon lord originally from the fantasy world of Alneath whose ambition is to rule the world. Slain in battle by the hero Gram, he does not completely die and is reincarnated by his subordinate Machina 500 years later in 2099, by which time Alneath has merged with Earth. Veltol decides to conquer this merged world, but is now powerless due to his magic abilities coming from belief from his followers. He thus works with Machina and her friend Takahashi to rebuild his following.
Machina Soleige (マキナ=ソレージュ, Makina Sorēju)
Voiced by: Miku Itō (Japanese); Sarah Wiedenheft (English)
Machina was one of Veltol's "Six Dark Peers", his most trusted followers, who has the ability to use fire magic. She also used magic to revive Veltol to life and is his most loyal follower. With Veltol having lost his magic powers, he moves in with Machina after he is revived.
Takahashi (高橋)
Voiced by: Hana Hishikawa (Japanese); Nia Celeste (English)
Takahashi is a hacker born into the world after the Fantasion, and a friend of Machina. She works with Machina to help Veltol regain his power.
Gram (グラム, Guramu)
Voiced by: Daisuke Namikawa (Japanese); Dio Garner (English)
Gram is a hero from Alneath who 500 years ago defeated Veltol in battle, resulting in him going into his long sleep until he was revived by Machina. For achieving this, a goddess granted Gram eternal youth. However, over the centuries his achievements were forgotten by most. After the Fantasion, Gram became a mercenary, but he has since become disillusioned with the world.
Marcus (マルキュス, Marukyusu)
Voiced by: Masaya Matsukaze (Japanese); Robert McCollum (English)
Antagonist of the first novel. Marcus was one of Veltol's Six Dark Peers, who can use blood magic. After the Fantasion, he becomes the director of the corporation Ishimaru Heavy Magical Industries (IHMI). When Veltol tries to reunite the Six Dark Peers, Marcus refuses to join, revealing he has always hated Veltol.
Kinohara (木ノ原)
Voiced by: Shizuka Itō (Japanese); Lydia Mackay (English)
The secretary to Marcus who trained at IHMI's elite facilities. She often interjects words and phrases in English into her speech in the original Japanese dialogue.

== Media ==
=== Light novels ===
No.	Title	Original release date	English release date
1	Cyberpunk City Shinjuku (電子荒廃都市・新宿)	January 20, 2021; 9784040739588	March 15, 2022; 9781975338626
2	Cybermagic City Akihabara (電脳魔導都市・秋葉原)	April 20, 2021; 9784040739632	June 21, 2022; 9781975336837
3	Meta-Utopia City Yokohama (楽園監獄都市・横浜)	June 20, 2023; 9784040750101	October 15, 2024; 9798855403114
4	Endgame City Washington (終極防衛都市・ワシントン)	October 19, 2024; 9784040756684	October 21, 2025; 9798855420715
5	Demon Lord City Shibuya (魔王降誕都市・渋谷)	November 20, 2024; 9784040756691	June 9, 2026; 9798855422009

=== Manga ===
The series received two manga adaptations. The first series, illustrated by Kiiro Akashiro, was serialized online on Kadokawa Shoten's Shōnen Ace Plus from November 5, 2021, to June 24, 2022, before being removed from the website for unknown reasons. The second series, illustrated by Yutaka Sakurai, was serialized on the same website from March 22, 2023, to August 7, 2024. The second series' chapters were collected into three tankōbon volumes from October 2023 to September 2024.

During their panel at Anime Expo 2025, Yen Press announced that they had also licensed the manga adaptation for English publication, and will release it as an omnibus volume. The omnibus was released in December 2025.

No.	Original release date	Original ISBN	North American release date	North American ISBN
1	October 26, 2023	978-4-04-114247-9	December 16, 2025	979-8-8554-2579-6
2	March 26, 2024	978-4-04-114761-0	December 16, 2025	979-8-8554-2579-6
3	September 25, 2024	978-4-04-115392-5	December 16, 2025	979-8-8554-2579-6

=== Anime ===
An anime adaptation was announced by Aniplex at AnimeJapan on March 25, 2023. It was later revealed to be a television series produced by J.C.Staff and directed by Ryo Ando, with Yūichirō Momose writing overseeing series scripts, Ryousuke Tanigawa designing the characters and Tatsuya Katō composing the music. The series aired from October 13 to December 29, 2024, on Tokyo MX and other networks. (Note: Tokyo MX lists the series premiere on October 12, 2024, at 24:00, which is effectively October 13 at midnight JST.) The opening theme song is "Hollow" performed by Shiyui, while the ending theme song is "Spira" performed by sekai. Crunchyroll streamed the series. Muse Communication licensed the series in Southeast Asia.

==== Episodes ====
No.	Title	Directed by	Storyboarded by	Original release date
1	"Cyberpunk City Shinjuku"; Transliteration: "Denshi Kōhai Shitī・Shinjuku" (Japanese: 電子荒廃都市・新宿)	Ryo Ando	Ryo Ando	October 13, 2024
Long ago, Demon Lord Veltol was defeated in battle by the Hero, but thanks to his reincarnation magic, he has returned after 500 years. Veltol is keen to resume his world domination once more, but his vassal, Machina – one of the Six Dark Peers – reveals an unexpected truth.
2	"The Demon Lord and His Vassals"; Transliteration: "Maō to Shinka" (Japanese: 魔王と臣下)	Kai Hasako	Kai Hasako	October 20, 2024
Veltol learns of his former vassal Marcus's betrayal firsthand. Meanwhile, Machina shows Veltol around the city. While Veltol struggles to adapt to the completely altered world of the future, Machina introduces him to someone.
3	"[Debut Stream] The Demon Lord Veltol Has Arisen!"; Transliteration: "[Hatsu Haishin] Maō Berutōru Fukkatsu no Toki de Aru!" (Japanese: 【初配信】魔王ベルトール復活の時である！)	Asahi Yoshimura	Shinpei Nagai	October 27, 2024
Following the advice of Machina's friend, Takahashi, Veltol begins streaming games with a face reveal. He spends his days establishing his image as a streamer, using Takahashi's strategy and influence. Meanwhile, Veltol goes for a stroll through the back alleys of Shinjuku's outskirts one day, and Veltol is intrigued by the sight of a particular vagabond.
4	"The Shadows of Shinjuku"; Transliteration: "Shinjuku-shi no Kage" (Japanese: 新宿市の影)	Ayako Kono	Ayako Kono	November 3, 2024
Veltol is asked to work as Takahashi's bodyguard. Hoping to test the strength of his restored faith as well, Veltol planned to launch a surprise attack on the yakuza, but their run-of-the-mill heist leads to unexpected developments, swallowing the two of them deeper into the city's dark underbelly.
5	"The Depths of the Crucible"; Transliteration: "Rutsubo no Soko" (Japanese: 坩堝の底)	Shunpei Umemoto	Koichi Takada	November 10, 2024
Machina lets her thoughts drift to Veltol as she prepares dinner. Meanwhile, Veltol learns new facts about the Immortal Furnace, and while he tries to inform Machina using Whisper magic, he gets no response. At the same time, Machina has an unexpected visitor...
6	"The Hero's Battle"; Transliteration: "Yūsha no Tatakai" (Japanese: 勇者の戦い)	Ryo Ando	Hiroshi Kobayashi	November 17, 2024
The Immortal Furnace lies directly below the Aether Reactor of Shinjuku, and Machina flies into a rage when Marcus reveals an appalling truth about immortals. Meanwhile, Kinohara stands in the way of Veltol's group. After Gram takes an attack for him, Veltol issues his orders.
7	"The Demon Lord's Resurrection"; Transliteration: "Maō Saitan" (Japanese: 魔王再誕)	Kaiho Kozo	Ryo Ando & Koichi Takada	November 24, 2024
Trusting Gram to handle Kinohara, Veltol reaches the Immortal Furnace. He grills Marcus about his betrayal of the immortals and why he kidnapped Machina. The legendary Demon Lord faces Shinjuku's ruler. The former lord and vassal cross blades in this new world.
8	"Cybermagic City Akihabara"; Transliteration: "Saibā Majikku Shitī・Akihabara" (Japanese: 電腦魔導都市・秋葉原)	Kai Hasako	Kai Hasako	December 1, 2024
Hizuki Reynard-Yamada heaves another deep sigh in class at the Akihabara Private School of Magic "Lu Xel". Meanwhile, Veltol defeats Marcus and safely rescues Machina. What he seeks next lies somewhere in Akihabara City...
9	"The Poor Student and the Exchange Student"; Transliteration: "Rettōsei to Ryūgakusei" (Japanese: 劣等生と留学生)	Shigeki Awai	Shinpei Nagai	December 8, 2024
Veltol, Machina, and Takahashi infiltrate Lu Xel under the pretense of a short-term exchange program so they can search for the regalia. When the three sit around a table in the school cafeteria, the school's top student – Albert – begins provoking Hizuki Reynard-Yamada, the woman seated nearby.
10	"Akihabara's Three Great Houses"; Transliteration: "Akihabara Gosanke" (Japanese: 秋葉原御三家)	Ayako Kono	Ayako Kono	December 15, 2024
Veltol and the others go to Electric Town and visit the maid café Helheim, where Hizuki works. While experiencing the unique services the maid café provides, Veltol asks Hizuki about the regalia. Afterward, the four head out into Electric Town where they encounter a certain someone.
11	"The Goddess Reincarnated"; Transliteration: "Megami Oroshi" (Japanese: 女神降ろし)	Kai Hasako	Toshimasa Ishii	December 22, 2024
After heading out into Electric Town, Veltol's group visits the mansion of the Reynard family. After entertaining them, Hizuki heads for the bathroom... only to find Veltol already there! The next day, Hizuki hears people talking about the explosion in Electric Town.
12	"The Lord's Return"; Transliteration: "Kaeki no Ō" (Japanese: 還帰の王)	Ryo Ando	Ryo Ando, Koichi Takada & Kai Hasako	December 29, 2024
Thanks to Mag Rosanta's plot, the goddess Meldia has manifested by using Hizuki as a vessel. Veltol battles Meldia in an attempt to save Hizuki. Meanwhile, Machina faces a young girl wearing a visor. What will happen to Akihabara City and the conflict between Electric Town and Magic Town?

== Reception ==
Demon Lord 2099 won the 33rd Fantasia Grand Prize.

The Encyclopedia of Science Fiction described Demon Lord 2099 as an enjoyable, lighthearted science fantasy anime that combines a cyberpunk setting with traditional fantasy elements. It noted that, despite the series' plentiful action, its principal focus is Veltol's adjustment to a technologically advanced world in which his former power and status have become largely irrelevant. The encyclopedia highlighted the humor arising from his arrogance, vanity and unfamiliarity with modern society, particularly his unlikely success as a video game streamer, whose popularity restores his magical powers. It also praised his gradual character development, observing that although Veltol retains his pompous personality, his relationships with Machina, Takahashi and Gram lead him to develop greater empathy.

== See also ==
- Ishura, another light novel series illustrated by the same artist
