= Getsumento Heiki Mina =

Japanese anime television series

- Promotional poster

月面兎兵器ミーナ
- Created by: Kazuya Tsurumaki
- Anime television series
- Directed by: Keiichiro Kawaguchi
- Produced by: Atsuya Takase; Yukihiro Itō; Kōji Yamamoto; Kazuyoshi Fukuba; Jun Katō
- Written by: Junki Takegami
- Music by: Kousuke Yamashita
- Studio: Gonzo
- Licensed by: NA: Crunchyroll (streaming)
- Original network: Fuji TV
- Original run: January 13, 2007 – March 24, 2007
- Episodes: 11 + 2
- Manga
- Written by: Nylon
- Published by: MediaWorks
- Imprint: Dengeki Comics
- Magazine: Dengeki Comic Gao!
- Original run: February 2007 – April 2008
- Volumes: 2

Getsumento Heiki Mina (月面兎兵器ミーナ, Getsumento Heiki Mīna; lit. Lunar Rabbit Weapon Mina) was a fictitious anime which appeared in the television miniseries Densha Otoko. In the same manner as Kujibiki Unbalance, an anime that began as a fictitious anime/manga within the anime/manga Genshiken, it has been adapted into a television series, which itself was later adapted into a manga series. Originally conceptualized by Kazuya Tsurumaki, the 11-episode series was produced by Gonzo, Fuji TV, Pony Canyon and GDH and directed by Keiichiro Kawaguchi, with Junki Takegami handling series composition, okama and Takashi Kumazen designing the characters and Kousuke Yamashita composing the music. The anime first aired on January 13, 2007, on Fuji TV and ran until March 24, 2007.

Anime News Network has reported that the official pronunciation of the series' title is Getsumento Heiki Mina, not Getsumen Usagi Heiki Mina. In the Densha Otoko drama, it was named just Getsumen Heiki Mina. The Densha Otoko version of Getsumen Heiki Mina ran for 26 episodes, and the story is completely different from the real-world anime.

== Story ==
After establishing contact with extraterrestrial civilizations, it was found that humans were the only race to develop various sports. The number of alien sports fans grew dramatically, and the most fanatic of them regularly harass stadiums for taking part in a game, or demanding a good show, etc. Finally a treaty was settled, ruling all interferences towards other planets' cultures illegal. Rabbit Force, a group of rabbit-themed henshin (transforming) girls, became responsible for enforcing the treaty and capturing any offenders.

== Characters ==
Mina Tsukuda (佃 美奈, Tsukuda Mina)
Voiced by: Marina Inoue
Mina is the current announcer for "SpoLuna". Unlike many typical shōjo protagonists, Mina is a very intelligent and hardworking girl who often chooses her responsibilities over self-indulgence.
Suiren Kōshū (甲州 翠怜, Kōshū Suiren)
Voiced by: Shizuka Itō
One of Mina's fellow announcers. She is a very mature and well-experienced women who is often admired for her cool demeanor. It is shown that Suirin inspired Mina's determination and her dream to become an announcer. When Suirin transforms into her alter ego; Ootsuki Miina, her calm and mature personality switches entirely. Rather, she gets too indulged in her battles and causes damage to property in the process.
Daisuke Kiryū (桐生 大介, Kiryū Daisuke)
Voiced by: Hiroki Touchi
Mina's other fellow announcer. Mina has a crush on him. He and Suirin have a sibling-like friendship, as well.
Onoue P
Voiced by: Joji Nakata
SpoLuna's producer. He was the one who picked out Kōshū and grew her to become SpoLuna's popular announcer. It is revealed later that he himself was an announcer before.
Katō D (加藤D)
Voiced by: Mitsuo Iwata
The director of SpoLuna. He gets angry with Mina when she leaves work (to become Tsukishiro Miina), arrives late, or other mistakes.
AD Suzuki (AD鈴木)
Voiced by: Masato Amada
An employee at SpoLuna, his position is never discussed in the series. He's often at Kato's side, assisting him and often calming him down after Mina upsets him.
Escartin Mutsumune (六棟 エスカルティン, Mutsumune Esukarutin)
Voiced by: Eri Nakao
A pink-haired girl with a long bang that moves about on her head. As a running gag, the bang often expresses her emotion through its movements. Escartin despises Mina, and is always trying to sabotage her, as she is jealous of her being an announcer. Because of Miina's naive optimism, she never notices Escartin's schemes. Escartin sleeps in a secret room in the prop room. In the last episode, she becomes an announcer.
Nakoru Hazemi (羽蝉 ナコル, Hazemi Nakoru)
Voiced by: Kana Hanazawa
The "sister" of Kanchi (in one episode, she hints that she and Kanchi are cousins who live together). She is a cheerleader and cares very much for Kanchi but also is easily annoyed by him. She looks up to Mina, and addresses her as senpai. Her alter ego is Minazuki Miina. At first, she disliked Tsukishiro Miina; because of all the attention she inadvertently drew from Kanchi. But when she goes with Tsukishiro Miina to save him from aliens, she realizes Tsukishiro cares for Kanchi.
Kanchi Hazemi (羽蝉 寛治, Hazemi Kanji)
Voiced by: Mitsuki Saiga
The "brother" of Nakoru. He is on the baseball team. He is an Otaku of Tsukishiro Miina and also has an infatuation for her.
Jun'ichiro Yoshimi (吉見 純一郎, Yoshimi Jun'ichiro)
Voiced by: Jun Oosuka
Kanchi's hyperactive friend, he is also deeply infatuated with Tsukishiro Miina. He even created a fansite about her. But in one episode, he is shown to have created fansites about each individual Miina.
Tomo Mochimura (餅村 トモ, Mochimura Tomo)
Voiced by: Ai Tokunaga
Mina's childhood friend.
Yuu Takanashi (小鳥遊 由宇, Takanashi Yuu)
Voiced by: Kazuko Kojima
A second grade-child actress. Her alter ego is Tamamushi Miina. She lives alone with her aunt because her parents are overseas due to work. When she first meets Mina, she tricks her by pretending to be a bystander who finds out Mina is a Rabbit Warrior and blackmails her for it.
Tsutsuji Sanae (早苗 つつじ, Sanae Tsutsuji)
Voiced by: Saki Nakajima
A female paparazzi. She became the target of an alien snipers when she took a photo containing a terrorist alien. She holds an interest in military weaponry. Her alter ego is Satsuki Miina. She is a Rogue Miina. But during an alien attack, Nanashi returns her Miina powers.
Minamo Haibara (灰原 水面, Haibara Minamo)
Voiced by: Mamiko Noto
A female background character who is shown to have multiple careers and is a Miina, as well.
Sumire Nishiha (西羽 すみれ, Nishiha Sumire)
Voiced by: Ayako Kawasumi
A girl who origins from Planet Miina(she would be considered in alien, but is a human nonetheless). She is an intergalactic celebrity and is part of the Miina Legion; a court that chooses Miinas. She dislikes Ootsuki Miina, and ruins her reputation by making her appear to be a maniac who loves chaos. She was jealous of her for stealing her place as #1 Miina. However, she doesn't count on Mina revealing her true identity, the other Miinas taking a stand against her, or Nanashi revealing a video showing her plotting to discredit Ootsuki. She has an assistant named Yayoi. Her alter ego is Shiwasu Miina.
Halmina Goldberg (ハルミナ·ゴールドバーグ, Harumina Gōrudobāgu)
Voiced by: Akeno Watanabe
She is an Otaku of the Miinas from California. Her idol is Kisaragi Miina, who tells her to become a Miina she must travel to Japan and have special training. But, Tamamushi Miina tells her she has been fooled. Ironically, Nanashi appears to Halmina to reveal that she is indeed a Miina.

=== Rabbit Force ===
A Getsumen To Heiki Miina, also known as a Miina or Rabbit Warrior, is a rabbit-themed mahō shōjo whose powers pass from mother to daughter. The idea of Miinas originated in Japan (due to Japan's mythology of rabbits), but it is shown that Miinas are worldwide. The Miinas are governed by the Miina Legion. They create rules and regulations regarding a Miina's position. A Miina have her powers evicted if she uses her powers for her own personal gain, resulting in being given the label "Rogue Miina". A Miina has a thematic food (typically produce) which she uses to transform by consuming the food and evoking "Ju-Jytsu". When a Miina transforms, she will gain pink/red eyes and sometimes other physical changes. Because of this, the powers of a Miina are believed to be genetic. A Miina defends herself with a high-tech machine that takes the overall image of her given thematic food. The machine can be changed into a weapon or tool that the Miina chooses. The machine attaches at the Miina's signature "triple tail"(two large rabbit tails attached by a small rabbit tail in between.) Because the machine most likely come in pairs, they attach at the two large tails.

Mīna Tsukishiro (月城 ミーナ, Tsukishiro Mīna)
Voiced by: Marina Inoue
The alter ego of Mina Tsukuda. Tsukishiro Miina's thematic food is carrots, thus she obtains two high-tech machines that look like carrots. She typically uses them as jet packs for flight or a hammer for defense. As a running gag, she hates carrots and grimaces in disgust whenever she uses them to transform. Her Miina costume consists of a white, short-sleeved belly shirt, black mini skirt, blue heels and red gloves. In the Densha Otoko series, the pattern of her tail was reversed; having one large rabbit tail in the middle with two smaller tails at the sides.
Mīna Ohtsuki (大月 ミーナ, Ōtsuki Mīna)
Voiced by: Shizuka Itō
The alter ego of Suiren Koshu. Her thematic food is beets, thus she obtains two high-tech machines in the appearance of beets. She often uses them as clubs or a baton. It's assumed she is a Rogue Miina because of her single tail and the fact that her weapons are not shown to be launched from the moon base. So rather than being attached to a triple tail, the beet-weapons typically float above her or she carries them. But mention of her being a Rogue was unheard. Her Miina costume consists of a black full body suit with an open zipper down the middle and thick purple boots and gloves. She is the only Miina whose physical appearance changes, her feminine caramel-colored bun is changed to a dark brown boyish cut (representing her personality change in alter egos) Her face also appears more masculine as well. When she attacks an alien, she'll go to extreme lengths to stop it. Often in the process she causes destruction, prompting the theory that she's a Rogue Miina due to this behavior.
Mīna Minazuki (水無月 ミーナ, Minazuki Mīna)
Voiced by: Kana Hanazawa
The alter ego of Nakoru Hazemi. Minazuki Miina's thematic food is tomatoes, giving her two high-tech machines in the appearance of tomatoes, she also has a small tomato baton. She is shown to use the machines as a bomb launcher. Her Miina costume is a short-sleeved school uniform (which is noted to look almost identical to her typical school uniform) with red shoes and two brown belts.
Mīna Tamamushi (玉虫 ミーナ, Tamamushi Mīna)
Voiced by: Kazuko Kojima
The alter ego of Yuu Takanashi. Her thematic food is cherries, thus she gains a pair of high tech machines that look like cherries. She uses them as bomb launchers. Unlike the others, she has no rabbit tail, rather the cherry-weapons attach to her head band. Her Miina costume is a school uniform with a jacket, red jet pack, and dress shoes. She is shown to echo Minazuki Miina's overall appearance.
Mīna Satsuki (皐月 ミーナ, Satsuki Mīna)
Voiced by: Saki Nakajima
The alter ego of Tsutsuji Sanae. Her transformation is activated by blueberries. She is a Rogue Miina. It has been hinted that she used her Miina powers to obtain an antique war craft item, resulting in having her powers evicted. Nanashi later gives her Miina powers back. But because she is a Rogue Miina she doesn't get an official Miina weapon. She gets a bazooka, which she is shown to being to conjure whenever she can in her Miina form. As a result, she has only a single rabbit tail. Her Miina costume consists of a camouflage tank top, black shorts, blue boots, black fingerless gloves and two blue sleeves on her fore arms.
Mīna Shiwasu (師走 ミーナ, Shiwasu Mīna)
Voiced by: Ayako Kawasumi
The alter ego of Sumire Nishiha. Her thematic food is a potato. But her high-tech machines are in a chain-like form and do not take the form of a potato. She isn't seen using them as a weapon or tool. When she first transforms, she has a single tail. But when her machines are fired from her private jets-rather than the Moon base-a triple rabbit tail appears. The tail pattern, however, is reversed. She is the only Miina whose weapons not only attach to her tail but also her collar. It's assumed that because she's part of the Miina Legion, she differs greatly from the other Miinas. Her Miina outfit is a black, short sleeve, belly shirt with a large puffy collar, denim shorts, black boots and multi-colored scrunchies on her wrists.
Mīna Yayoi (弥生 ミーナ, Yayoi Mīna)
Voiced by: Omi Minami
Shiwasu Miina's assistant. She has a Miina form but her thematic food, weapon, and transformation not displayed. Her Miina costume consists of a pink layered fluffy poncho, and white boots.
Mīna Hazuki (葉月 ミーナ, Hazuki Mīna)
Voiced by: Chie Horikoshi
In pedestrian form, she works at a restaurant. Her Miina costume is a long white gown, red gloves and black dress shoes. Her transformation sequence is not shown.
Mīna Shiratori (白鳥 ミーナ, Shiratori Mīna)
Voiced by: Michiko Neya
In pedestrian form, she works at the restaurant. She wears a black leather jacket and a large green and white skirt. Her transformation sequence is not shown.
Mīna Shimotsuki (霜月 ミーナ, Shimotsuki Mīna)
Voiced by: Akeno Watanabe
The alter ego of Halmina Goldberg. Her thematic food is corn, so she obtains two high-tech machines in the form of ears of corn. Her Miina costume consists of an orange kimono-like shirt, black thongs, knee-high stockings, dress shoes, and orange gloves. She also has a sword to attack with.
Mīna Kisaragi (如月 ミーナ, Kisaragi Mīna)
Voiced by: Mayumi Asano
Her thematic food is supposedly cauliflower. Her Miina costume is a green sports bra, crossed shoulder bags, green parachute pants, sandals and fluffy scrunchies on her wrists. Her transformation sequence is not shown. Kisaragi's pedestrian persona is not displayed in the series. She has a ganguro appearance.
Mīna Akiyama (秋山 ミーナ, Akiyama Mīna)
Voiced by: Mamiko Noto
The alter ego of Minamo Haibara. Her thematic food is lotus fruit. She is shown to use her two lotus-weapons as missile launchers. Her Miina costume consists of an oversized, long sleeved, gray wool shirt with blue ribbons, black shoes and black pants.
Nanashi (名無し)
Voiced by: Joji Nakata
He is a robot that appears as an infant dressed in a peanut/rabbit costume. Whether or not this is his real form or simply a disguise is never discussed.

== Episodes ==
| No. | Title | Original release date |
|---|---|---|
| 1 | "First Jujitsu"; Transliteration: "Hajimete no Jūjitsu" (Japanese: はじめての汁実) | January 13, 2007 |
High school student, Miina Tsukada gets her dream job as an announcer at the all-famous, Luna-P news. After making a bad first impression, she is given a chance to redeem herself by interviewing a famous baseball player. But she finds he was attacked by an alien and soon becomes captured also. Ootsuki Miina saves her at the last minute, and leads the battle towards the baseball field, leaving Mina dumbfounded. Nanashi appears and tells Miina she can transform into a Getsumen To Heiki Miina. Miina reluctantly transforms but is still empowered to succeed in defeating the alien. Ootsuki and Tsukishiro(Mina) defeat and capture the alien together.
| 2 | "I Love Pro Wrestling"; Transliteration: "Puroresu Daisuki" (Japanese: プロレス大好き) | January 20, 2007 |
Mina is given the responsibility of hosting SpoLuna about the history of Japan's greatest professional wrestlers. After longs hours of research and typing, she presents it to Suirin, who rejects the script and tells her "this is not school work, it must be in your own words" Mina takes the new advice and restarts. On the day of her presentation, Escartin sabotages her by switching her script with a cook book. When Mina starts reading and finds out what happened, she freezes. But, remembering Suirin's words, Mina recites what she researched effortlessly. Towards the end an alien-who had taken the form of Kato-attacks. Mina, overwhelmed by her emotions, takes a stand against the alien. But when the alien continues attack, Mina has no choice but to transform and fight the alien. Afterwards, Kato scolds her for leaving, but then she is told by a co-worker that she gained fan praise for standing up against the alien.
| 3 | "Magic Ball of the Promise"; Transliteration: "Yakusoku no Makyū" (Japanese: やくそくの魔球) | January 27, 2007 |
Mina is asked to interview her high school's baseball team, whom Kanchi plays for. When Mina tries to interview him, he shuns her. After talking with Nakoru, she tells Mina that Kanchi feels neglected by her ever since she got her job as an announcer. Mina is left feeling torn between her friends and her career. Afterwards, she and the news team do an overview of the high school's next game. But an L-alien(cheerleading alien) attacks and Mina must transform. After the battle, Mina decides to encourage and cheer for Kanchi, even though as an announcer, she is not allowed to bias. Kanchi wins the game and Mina gains fan praise for her cheering.
| 4 | "Mutsumune's Big Break"; Transliteration: "Mutsumune Dai Burēku" (Japanese: 六棟大ブレーク) | February 3, 2007 |
Escartin, Suirin, and Mina are representing SpoLuna at the SummerFest volleyball tournament. During the tournament, a Nipuru alien (trophy thief alien) disguises himself as one of the players and plays alongside Escartin against Mina and Suirin. After losing a few rounds, Mina feels embarrassed and apologizes to Suirin. But Suirin reassures her that "victory is great, but its even better if you had fun earning it" Mina takes this advice and wins against Escartin but admits she was happier that she had fun rather than because she won. But afterwards, the alien reveals his true form and attacks. Mina transforms and fights alongside Ootsuki. But during battle Ootsuki reveals she enjoys battle and quotes Suirin's words about and enjoyed victory. Leaving Tsukishiro to ponder if Ootsuki is Suirin.
| 5 | "Red Card for Miina?"; Transliteration: "Mīna ni Reddo Kādo?" (Japanese: ミーナに赤札?) | February 10, 2007 |
Mina is confronted by child actress, Yuu Takanashi, who guest stars on SpoLuna. She threatens to reveal Mina's identity. Mina is then caught in the choice of erasing all of Yuu's memory. But then, after learning that Yuu's parents are never around and that the Ferris wheel is an important memory of them Mina realizes she shouldn't. Then, a Jagirian alien disrupts a soccer game, but Mina is captured. While Mina struggles to transform Yuu transforms into Tamamushi Miina and defeats the aliens herself. Afterwards, she discusses the trick she played on Mina to Nanashi on the Ferris wheel.
| 6 | "The Bottom of the Bath"; Transliteration: "Rotenburo no Soko" (Japanese: 露天風呂のソコ) | February 17, 2007 |
Mina and Kyru go over to the Hot Springs where a group of famous baseball players grew a strange stroke of violence whilst over there. The two are supposed to go there for publicity, but Mina finds herself growing reluctantly of her romantic feelings for Kyru. Meanwhile, Escartin sneaks to the Hot Spring to sabotage Mina once again. But her plans fail when she is captured by a group of personality-switching aliens that were responsible for the baseball players' violence. Escartin-now in a violent persona-attacks Mina, but Ootsuki comes in a rescues her. Once the alien emerges, Mina transforms. But the admits to Ootsuki that she wishes she wasn't a Miina because it gets in the ways of her responsibilities, and also admits that a crush on a co-worker(Kyru) gets in the way. Ootsuki admits also that a crush gets in the way of her responsibilities(hinting it may be Mina, or Kyru also). The two then battle the aliens together.
| EX–1 | "Lovely Halmina"; Transliteration: "Uruwashi no Harumina" (Japanese: 麗しのハルミナ) | June 6, 2007 |
| 7 | "Suiren's Scandal"; Transliteration: "Suiren-senpai no Furin" (Japanese: 翠怜先輩の不倫) | February 24, 2007 |
A girl named Paparazzi takes a candid false photo of Surin having an affair. Resulting in Suirin not appearing at SpoLuna. Mina confronts Paparazzi, but ends up befriending her. While Mina is at work the next day, Paparazzi fulfills her fetish for antique military weaponry by trying to buy a tank. But it was really a trap for the aliens to kill her. When Mina leaves work to transform and battle, she and Paparazzi realise the reason why they wanted to kill Paparazzi: the picture also showed an alien terrorist hiding in the background. Which also reveals that Suirin was aware of the scam and tried to stop it; not having an affair. Then, Nanashi appears and shows that Paparazzi is a Rogue Miina, but gives her back her powers. Tsukishiro and Satsuki(Paparazzi) defeat the aliens.
| 8 | "Nakoru, Displeased"; Transliteration: "Fukigen na Nakoru" (Japanese: 不機嫌なナコル) | March 3, 2007 |
Nakoru becomes more annoyed with Kanchi and has and scolds him. Nakoru talks it out with Mina, revealing that she and Kanchi aren't really sibling and that her mother left them. But and Abducto alien captures him and reveals his plan to capture famous baseball players and use their skills to create an ultimate baseball team and gain fame. Meanwhile, Tsukishiro takes Nakoru along with her to save Kanchi. During battle, Nakoru accidentally triggers her transformation, revealing that she is a Miina. She defeats the alien and Nanashi tells her that to avoid harassment from the aliens her mother moved away after giving her Miina powers to Nakoru. Tsukishiro is then left pondering the idea of her own mother as a Miina.
| 9 | "Deathmatch at 1,000 Kilometers"; Transliteration: "Kōdo Senkiromētoru no Shitō" (Japanese: 高度千粁の死闘) | March 10, 2007 |
All of the Miinas are captured by an alien. They must win a game of ping-pong against it or have their identities revealed. But the alien uses hypnotic powers on each Miina, which puts them in a sub-conscious state of mind to distract them from the game. But during the sub-conscious state of mind, the alien reveals that all of the Miinas, struggle with their own responsibilities and dreams. Tsukishiro realizes she's not the only one struggling. When Ootsuki plays, she counteracts the hypnotic spell by claiming she will never be defeated as long as she tried her best until the end. Tsukishiro recognizes the quote: a quote from Suirin years ago when she was Mina's age. Then, she realizes Ootsuki truly is Suirin. Ootsuki defeats the alien, but he reveals the Miina's identities anyway to every television in the world-or so he thinks-Nanashi deleted all video evidence of the Miinas. Unfortunately, the alien self-destructs the ship. Tamamushi, Satsuki and Minazuki were transported back to Earth by Nanashi, but Ootsuki and Tsukishiro are left in space. Ootsuki explains their situation, but Tsukishiro claims "she's not afraid as long as she's with Suirin" Ootsuki transports them back home.
| 10 | "It Came from Space!"; Transliteration: "Uchū kara Kita yo" (Japanese: 宇宙から来たヨ) | March 17, 2007 |
The episode starts with Tsukishiro and Ootsuki fighting an alien at the beach. As usual, Ootsuki unintentionally causes mass damage to property. The next day, Mina is asked to interview a celebrity, Sumire Nishiha. The two enjoy themselves in an outdoor mall, until Sumire reveals her hatred for Ootsuki Miina. At SpoLuna, the cast discusses Ootsuki's damage and the public's complaints. Later on when the cast hosts a wrestling match, an alien attacks. Ootsuki chases after the alien but, yet again, causes more damage than needed. Then, the alien captures Kyru and threatens to kill Ootsuki if she tries to rescue him. Willing to make the sacrifice, Ootsuki proceeds as the alien electrocutes her. But rather than killing her, he returns her to her pedestrian form; revealing her identity. Just then Sumire appears as Shiratori Miina and convinces the public that Ootsuki Miina is an unfit heroine-and also offers the aliens their own personal sports arena on Planet Miina.
| 11 | "Last Announcement"; Transliteration: "Rasuto Anaunsu" (Japanese: 最終アナウンス) | March 24, 2007 |
Suirin quits her job, as well as Kyru; feeling offended that she would keep a large secret from him. Leaving Mina in a great depression. While Sumire has gained utter control over seemingly everyone, Suirin comes over to her to have her powers evicted. Mina tries to continue her job at SpoLuna-which is being watched by everyone as well as Sumire-during the broadcast, Miina sends a message to Suirin that she should never give up, no matter what the costs are. She then transforms on set and goes to Sumire's jet to take Suirin. Meanwhile, Nanashi has a plot of his own: he has video evidence of Sumire plotting Ootsuki's downfall and the reason why. He manages to get the cast of SpoLuna to broadcast it, leaving the public to turn on Sumire. The other Miinas then transform and join Tsukishiro and Ootsuki to fight Sumire. Afterwards, the cast of SpoLuna celebrate at the sushi bar.
| EX–2 | "The Tale of Miina Akiyama"; Transliteration: "Akiyama Mīna Densetsu" (Japanese: 秋山ミーナ伝説) | August 1, 2007 |

Note: EX-1 and EX-2 are DVD-exclusive episodes.

== Theme songs ==
- Opening Theme

"Lights, Camera. Action!" by Halcali

- Ending Theme

"Beautiful Story" by Marina Inoue, Yasutaka Nakata

== Other appearances ==
Mina Tsukuda is seen in episodes 33 and 34 of Hayate no Gotoku! as a reporter. In the first episode, she is mostly in the background, though she is seen being chased by a mob, after which she flies overhead in her full battle-ready Mina Tsukishiro persona. In the second episode, she interviews Hayate as he is baking cakes. Director Keiichiro Kawaguchi did both series.
