= Studio Palette =

Japanese animation studio

Studio Palette Co., Ltd.
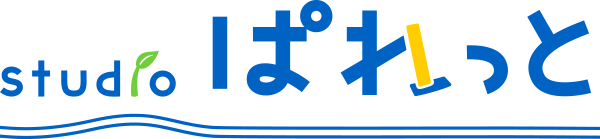
- Native name: 株式会社studioぱれっと
- Romanized name: Kabushiki-gaisha Suteyūdio Paretto
- Type: Kabushiki gaisha
- Industry: Japanese animation
- Founded: February 2018; 8 years ago
- Founder: Yuuki Saitou
- Headquarters: 5-27-8 Ogikubo, Suginami, Tokyo, Japan
- Key people: Yuuki Saitou (CEO)
- Number of employees: 46
- Divisions: Studio Palette Kobe Green (Note: Studio Palette Kobe Green (studioぱれっと KOBE green), the studio's Kobe branch founded in April 7, 2025.)
- Website: studiopalette.net

Studio Palette Co., Ltd. (Japanese: 株式会社studioぱれっと, Hepburn: Kabushiki-gaisha Sutajio Paretto) is a Japanese animation studio based in Suginami, Tokyo.

== Establishment ==
The studio was founded in Suginami, Tokyo in February 2018 by producer Yuuki Saitou. Saitou had previously acted as a representative of Husio Studio, co-founded with animator Kazuhiro Hocchi, and established Palette shortly after Hocchi's resignation as representative director in order to take over Husio Studio's business assets, which were liquidated in 2020.

== Works ==
=== TV series ===
Title	Director(s)	First run start date	First run end date	Eps	Note(s)	Ref.
Shōnen Ashibe: GO! GO! Goma-chan 3	Kondō Nobuhiro	April 3, 2018	February 26, 2019	32	Based on a manga by Hiromi Morishita. Co-produced with Bridge.	
The World's Finest Assassin Gets Reincarnated in Another World as an Aristocrat	Masafumi Tamura	October 6, 2021	December 22, 2021	12	Based on a light novel by Rui Tsukiyo. Co-produced with Silver Link.	
KamiKatsu: Working for God in a Godless World	Yuki Inaba	April 6, 2023	July 6, 2023	12	Based on a manga by Aoi Akashiro.	
Quality Assurance in Another World	Kei Umabiki	July 6, 2024	September 28, 2024	13	Based on a manga by Masamichi Sato. Co-produced with 100studio.	
Our Last Crusade or the Rise of a New World Season II	Yuki Inaba	July 10, 2024	June 26, 2025	12	Second season of the anime series; based on a light novel by Kei Sazane. Co-produced with Silver Link.	
Horror Collector	Yuki Inaba	October 10, 2026	TBA	12	Based on a children's novel by Norio Tsuruta and Midori Sato.	
The Reincarnated Elf Left on a Journey to Master His Magic	Yuki Inaba	January 6, 2027	TBA	TBA	Based on a light novel by Monsho Sakakibara.	
I Lost My Adventurer's License, but It's Fine Because I Have an Adorable Daughter Now	Yuki Inaba	January 8, 2027	TBA	TBA	Based on a light novel by Manimani Ononata.	
Our Last Crusade or the Rise of a New World Season III	Yuki Inaba	TBA	TBA	TBA	Third season of the anime series; based on a light novel by Kei Sazane. Co-produced with Silver Link.	
