= AliA =

Japanese pop rock band

- Origin: Japan
- Genres: Rock; J-pop
- Years active: 2018–present
- Labels: Slide Sunset; Republic
- Members: Ayame; Eren Okamura; TKT; Seiya; Rina
- Past members: Bob
- Website: alialive.jp

AliA is a Japanese pop rock band formed in 2018.

== History ==
AliA was formed in July of 2018 when keyboarder TKT and guitarist Eren Okamura decided to start a band. Eren found about vocalist Ayame through a friend. At that time she was active as a solo musician. After Eren attended one of her concerts in Chiba with only 2.000 Yen in his pocket, she was invited to join the band as their vocalist. Violinist Rina was invited to join the group by Eren as well. Drummer Bob and bassist Seiya were members in other bands when they were asked to join AliA. In December of 2018 the group released a demo CD under the title Limit which was sold exclusively at Tower Records Shibuya and Village Vanguard for 100 Yen.

In February of 2019 the band released their first EP containing seven songs entitled AliVe which was produced by Satori Hiraide who produced works by Uverworld in the past. Between February and May the band toured throughout Japan in promotion of AliVe. In September the same year the release of the second EP entitled Realize followed. The same named song was used as theme song for Nippon TV drama Criminologist Himura and Mystery Author Arisugawa. Between August and December the band toured excessively throughout Japan while the first two concerts took place in Hongkong and Taiwan which marked their first international concerts. Between January 4–27, 2020 the band toured throughout the United States and Europe while the Asian leg of the tour was cancelled due to the restrictions during the COVID-19 pandemic outbreak.

Taken from the 2019s' EP AliVe, the song "Limit" was used as opening theme song for the first season of web anime Inō no AICis. In April and Mai 2021 the band embarked on their third concert tour throughout Japan. AliA released their debut album entitled Me in December 2021. In addition, the band played a concert the entrance fee for which was just 100 Yen. In July of 2023, drummer Bob decided to leave the group. In October, the band released digital single "Aikotoba" which was used in the ending credits of the anime series Our Dating Story. In January 2024, AliA digitally released the song "Kokoro no Naka" was used as ending theme song in the first season of the anime production Tales of Wedding Rings. AliA produced the song "NewGame" which was used as opening theme song for the Gods' Games We Play anime series. It was announced that AliA will provide the opening theme song for the second season of the fantasy anime series Our Last Crusade or the Rise of a New World called Senaka Awase.

== Musical style ==
AliA described themselves as a "hybrid rock band" because their individual musical influences are wide spread, from classical music to modern rock. In her concert coverage for Real Sound, Rie Hata wrote that the music of the group ranges from classical to metal, from hard rock and alternative rock to anime and video game music, and J-pop.

== Discography ==
=== Albums ===
Title	Album details
Me	Released: December 22, 2021; Label: Slide Sunset; Formats: CD, digital download, streaming

=== EPs/mini albums ===
List of extended plays, with selected details and chart positions
Title	Details	Peak chart positions
Title	Details	JPN
AliVe	Released: February 20, 2019; Label: Slide Sunset; Formats: CD, digital download, streaming	94 (Note: The Oricon Chart Archive only lists the first 50 positions. Lower ranks are not displayed anymore but the chart position can be viewed in an archived version of the album entry at Oricon.)
Realize	Released: September 18, 2019; Label: Slide Sunset; Formats: CD, digital download, streaming	36

=== Singles ===
List of singles, with selected chart positions
Title	Year	Peak chart positions	Album
Title	Year	JPN	Album
"Slide Sunset"	2019	—	Me
"eye"	2020	30	Non-album singles
"Refrain Mayday"	2020	—	Non-album singles
"Promise"	2021	—	Non-album singles
"Yubisaki"	2021	—	Non-album singles
"Steroid"	2021	—	Non-album singles
"Nostalgia"	2021	—	Me
"Onigokko"	2021	—	Me
"100-Nen ni Ichido no Kono Yoru ni!"	2021	—	Me
"Cinderella Story"	2022	—	Non-album singles
"Boku ga Boku de Aru Tame ni"	2023	—	Non-album singles
"Aikotoba"	2023	—	Non-album singles
"Kokoro no Naka"	2024	—	Non-album singles
"NewGame"	2024	—	Non-album singles
