= Hana Hishikawa =

Japanese voice actress

- 菱川 花菜
- Born: May 19, 2003 (age 23); Tokyo, Japan
- Occupation: Voice actress
- Years active: 2020–present
- Agents: Pro-Fit (2020–2022); Raccoon Dog (2022–present)

Hana Hishikawa (菱川 花菜, Hishikawa Hana; born May 19, 2003) is a Japanese voice actress who is affiliated with Raccoon Dog (formerly with Pro-Fit). She played her major first voice role as Yui Nagomi/Cure Precious, the protagonist of the 2022 magical girl anime series Delicious Party Pretty Cure.

== Biography ==
Hishikawa was born on 19 May 2003 in Tokyo to her father Seiichi Hishikawa, a film director. After finishing training in 2020, she became affiliated with the voice acting agency Pro-Fit while in high school. As a result of Pro-Fit's closure, Hishikawa was transferred to Raccoon Dog on 1 April 2022. In 2022, she was selected as the main character of Delicious Party Pretty Cure, Yui Nagomi/Cure Precious.

== Filmography ==
=== TV anime ===
2020

- Moriarty the Patriot as Girl

2021

- Aikatsu Planet! as Child
- Farewell, My Dear Cramer as Kunogi No. 2
- SSSS.Dynazenon as Weather forecaster
- The Saint's Magic Power is Omnipotent as Handmaiden, Maid
- Joran: The Princess of Snow and Blood as multiple characters
- The Aquatope on White Sand as Customers
- Blue Period as Woman

2022

- Delicious Party Pretty Cure as Yui Nagomi/Cure Precious

2024

- An Archdemon's Dilemma: How to Love Your Elf Bride as Chastille Lillqvist
- Why Does Nobody Remember Me in This World? as Reiren
- Demon Lord 2099 as Takahashi
- The Stories of Girls Who Couldn't Be Magicians as Kurumi Mirai
- Let This Grieving Soul Retire! as Éclair Gladis
- Duel Masters Lost: Tsuioku no Suishō as Niika

2025

- The Shiunji Family Children as Minami Shiunji
- Turkey! Time to Strike as Mai Otonashi
- Backstabbed in a Backwater Dungeon as Nazuna

2026

- The Warrior Princess and the Barbaric King as Cersei
- Ichijyoma Mankitsu Gurashi! as Meiko Morita
- Goodbye, Lara as Lara
- Though I Am an Inept Villainess as Leelee
- A Certain Dark Item as Choubi Hanano
- Tetsuryō! Meet with Tetsudō Musume as Shiina Igusa

2027

- Magical Buffs: The Support Caster Is Stronger Than He Realized! as Heidemarie
- The Reincarnated Elf Left on a Journey to Master His Magic as Minori

=== Animated films ===
- Pompo: The Cinéphile (2021)
- Shōjo Kageki Revue Starlight (2021)

=== OVAs/ONAs ===
- Given: Uragawa no Sonzai (2019) as Schoolgirl
- Duel Masters Lost: Tsuioku no Suishō (2024) as Niika

=== Video games ===
2019

- Touhou Danmaku Kagura as Aki Shizuha

2021

- Demon Slayer: Kimetsu no Yaiba – The Hinokami Chronicles

2026

- BanG Dream! Our Notes as Chieri Umezato
- Street Fighter 6 as Yasmine
- Fire Emblem: Fortune's Weave as Esmeralda
- Nekopara: Sekai Connect as Pawpaw
- Petit Planet as Manna
- Arknights: Endfield as Mimino

=== Other ===
- A Couple of Cuckoos 100 People 100 Voices Project (2021)
