= Our Last Crusade or the Rise of a New World =

Japanese light novel series and its franchise

- First light novel volume cover, featuring Aliceliese Lou Nebulis IX

キミと僕の最後の戦場、あるいは世界が始まる聖戦 (Kimi to Boku no Saigo no Senjō, Aruiwa Sekai ga Hajimaru Seisen)
- Genre: Fantasy; Romance
- Light novel
- Written by: Kei Sazane
- Illustrated by: Ao Nekonabe
- Published by: Fujimi Shobo
- English publisher: NA: Yen Press
- Imprint: Fujimi Fantasia Bunko
- Original run: May 20, 2017 – present
- Volumes: 16
- Manga
- Written by: Kei Sazane
- Illustrated by: Okama
- Published by: Hakusensha
- English publisher: NA: Yen Press
- Magazine: Young Animal
- Original run: May 11, 2018 – March 12, 2021
- Volumes: 7
- Anime television series
- Directed by: Shin Oonuma; Mirai Minato (S1); Yuki Inaba (S2–3)
- Produced by: List: Norio Fukui (S1-2); Kazuasa Umeda (S1-2); Kouji Sawahata (S1-2); Noritomo Isogai (S1-2); Soujirou Arimizu (S1); Adam Zehner (S1); Yukari Iso (S1); Takumi Morii (S1); Kousuke Arai (S1); Sora Kimura (S2); Aya Iizuka (S2); Kanako Takahashi (S2); Ryuuta Kobayashi (S2)
- Written by: Kento Shimoyama (S1); Yuki Inaba (S2–3); Shunsuke Ishikawa (S2)
- Music by: Seima Iwahashi; Ryōta Tomura; Ryūichirō Fujinaga
- Studio: Silver Link; Studio Palette (S2–3)
- Licensed by: Crunchyroll (Note: In North America through Crunchyroll, LLC (formerly known as Funimation).); SEA: Plus Media Networks Asia
- Original network: AT-X, Tokyo MX, ABC, BS11 (S1-2); TV Aichi (S1)
- Original run: October 7, 2020 – present
- Episodes: 24
- icon

Our Last Crusade or the Rise of a New World (Japanese: キミと僕の最後の戦場、あるいは世界が始まる聖戦, Hepburn: Kimi to Boku no Saigo no Senjō, Aruiwa Sekai ga Hajimaru Seisen), abbreviated as KimiSen (キミ戦), is a Japanese light novel series written by Kei Sazane and illustrated by Ao Nekonabe. Fujimi Shobo, under Kadokawa Corporation, has published sixteen volumes and three short story collections since May 2017 under their Fujimi Fantasia Bunko label. A manga adaptation by Okama was serialized in Hakusensha's Young Animal magazine from May 2018 to March 2021. Both the light novel and manga are licensed in North America by Yen Press. An anime television series adaptation by Silver Link aired from October to December 2020. A second season by Silver Link and Studio Palette aired from July 2024 to June 2025. A third season has been announced.

== Plot ==
For years, a seemingly endless war has raged between the technologically advanced Heavenly Empire and the country of powerful magic users known as the Nebulis Sovereignty. In the present day, a master swordsman from the Empire named Iska and the "Ice Calamity Witch" from Nebulis' ruling family, Aliceliese, meet on the battlefield, determined to kill each other. However, even as enemies, both harbor a secret desire to peacefully end the war between their two nations without further bloodshed. As circumstances continuously conspire to bring them together, Iska and Alice begin to wonder if they can find peace with each other at first, and through this, create a path to bring an end to this war.

== Characters ==
=== Main characters ===
Iska (イスカ, Isuka)
Voiced by: Yūsuke Kobayashi (Japanese); Jason Liebrecht (English)
The unofficial leader of the Heavenly Empire's 907th Unit and an unparalleled swordsman who wields the black and white colored astral swords that can negate most types of magic. At the age of 16, he was recognized as the youngest Saint Disciple in the Empire's history. However, for unexplained reasons, he freed a witch who was being held in an Imperial prison, resulting in him being stripped of his title and then imprisoned for a year as punishment. Now, the leaders of the Empire have given him another chance at freedom, provided he kills a certain purebred witch. However, Iska seeks to find a way to end the ongoing war without further bloodshed.
Aliceliese Lou Nebulis IX (アリスリーゼ・ルー・ネブリス9世, Arisurīze rū Neburisu Kyūsei)
Voiced by: Sora Amamiya (Japanese); Emily Neves (English)
Aliceliese, or "Lady Alice," is the purebred "Ice Calamity Witch" with powerful ice-based magic that rivals most other astral mages in her homeland of the Nebulis Sovereignty. As a daughter of the Nebulis royal family, Alice is in line for the throne that Millavair, the current queen and her mother, holds. After running into Iska multiple times, she starts to develop feelings for him, and even makes an attempt to recruit him to her cause. Like Iska, she quietly seeks to end the war between the two countries without further bloodshed as well. However, these ideals raise tensions with her mother, who sees no path to peace with the Empire, even going as far as burning artwork in her personal room that was made within the Empire.

=== Heavenly Empire ===
==== Emperor ====
Emperor Yunmelngen (天帝ユンメルンゲン, Tentei Yunmerungen)
Voiced by: Aoi Yūki (Japanese); Katelyn Barr (English)
The emperor of the Empire.

==== 907th Unit ====
Mismis Klass (ミスミス・クラス, Misumisu Kurasu)
Voiced by: Nao Shiraki (Japanese); Lindsay Seidel (English)
Captain of the 907th Unit. Despite looking like a child, acting like a klutz, and having low physical strength, she still provides moral support to her comrades in the Unit. Later on, she gets exposed to a star vortex and is branded as an astral mage. Though her powers are currently unknown, the rest of the Unit is forced to hide her brand lest she be experimented on by the Empire.
Jhin Syulargun (ジン・シュラルガン, Jin Shurarugan)
Voiced by: Shun'ichi Toki (Japanese); Alejandro Saab (English)
A skilled sharpshooter with the 907th Unit who usually speaks in a dry tone.
Nene Alkastone (音々・アルカストーネ, Nene Arukasutōne)
Voiced by: Kaori Ishihara (Japanese); Sarah Roach (English)
A high-spirited field mechanic and weapons designer in the 907th Unit who creates and deploys anti-magic equipment during missions.

==== Saint Disciples ====
Johaim Leo Armadel (ヨハイム・レオ・アルマデル, Yohaimu Reo Arumaderu)
Voiced by: Junya Enoki (Japanese); Ryan Negrón (English)
The first seat of the Saint Disciples.
May (冥, Mei)
Voiced by: Miyu Tomita (Japanese); Nia Celeste (English)
The third seat of the Saint Disciples.
Magnacasa Gunfight (マグナカッサ・ガンファイト, Magunakasa Ganfaito)
Voiced by: Show Hayami (Japanese); Kent Williams (English)
The fourth seat of the Saint Disciples.
Risya In Empire (璃洒・イン・エンパイア, Rurisha In Enpaia)
Voiced by: Ayana Taketatsu (Japanese); Dani Chambers (English)
The fifth seat of the Saint Disciples.
Nameless (ネームレス, Nēmuresu)
Voiced by: Jun Kasama (Japanese); Patrick Seitz (English)
An assassin who is the eighth seat of the Saint Disciples.
Sir Karosos Newton (サー・カロッソス・ニュートン, Sā Karososu Nyūton)
Voiced by: Tomokazu Sugita (Japanese); Jim Foronda (English)
The tenth seat of the Saint Disciples.
Garganly (ガルガンリィ, Garuganrii)
Voiced by: Kazuyuki Okitsu (Japanese); William Ofoegbu (English)
The eleventh seat of the Saint Disciples.

==== 104th Unit ====
Shanorotte Gregory (シャノロッテ・グレゴリー, Shanorotte Guregorī)
Voiced by: Ami Koshimizu (Japanese); Tia Ballard (English)
The captain of the 104th Unit. She is a friend of Mismis.

=== Nebulis Sovereignty ===
==== Founder ====
Founder Nebulis (始祖ネビュリス世, Shiso Nebyurisu)
Voiced by: Houko Kuwashima (Japanese); Monica Rial (English)
The founder of the Nebulis Sovereignty.

==== House of Lou ====
Millavair Lou Nebulis VIII (ミラベア・ルゥ・ネビュリス8世, Mirabea Ruu Nebyurisu 8-sei)
Voiced by: Aya Hisakawa, Sumire Uesaka (young) (Japanese); Anastasia Muñoz (English)
Queen of the Nebulis Sovereignty.
Elletear Lou Nebulis IX (イリーティア・ルゥ・ネビュリス9世, Irītia Ruu Nebyurisu 9-sei)
Voiced by: Miyuki Sawashiro (Japanese); Anairis Quiñones (English)
Alice and Sisbell's older sister.
Sisbell Lou Nebulis IX (シスベル・ルゥ・ネビュリス9世, Shisuberu Ruu Nebyurisu 9-sei)
Voiced by: Azumi Waki (Japanese); Emi Lo (English)
Alice's younger sister who was held captive in the Empire until Iska freed her one year prior to the start of the story. She has a psychometric-style ability called "Lamplight," where she can see things that happened up to 200 years in the past, within 3 kilometers (about 2 miles) around her. She believes there is a threat to her family that only Iska can help her with.
Rin Vispose (燐・ヴィスポーズ, Rin Visupōzu)
Voiced by: Yumiri Hanamori (Japanese); Hayden Daviau (English)
Alice's personal maid and bodyguard who has served her from early childhood. In addition to her physical and martial prowess, Rin is a powerful astral mage who uses earth-based magic to create golems.
Schwartz (シュヴァルツ, Shuvarutsu)
Voiced by: Jin Urayama (Japanese); Ben Phillips (English)
Sisbell's elderly butler.
Yumilecia (ユミリーシャ, Yumirīsha)
Voiced by: Rena Hasegawa (Japanese); Claire Parry (English)
A servant of the Lou family.
Cystea Cuo Katz (システア, Shisutea)
Voiced by: Yurie Kozakai (Japanese); Taylor Murphy (English)
A servant of the Lou family. Her astral spirit allows her to collect and analyze sounds. It is also capable of muffling some voices and footsteps.
Noel (ノエル, Noeru)
Voiced by: Sora Tokui (Japanese); Kayla Temshiv (English)
A servant of the Lou family.
Nami Orcast (ナミ)
Voiced by: Rin Kurusu (Japanese); Lauren Massey (English)
A servant of the Lou family. Her astral spirit allows her to camouflage herself and others for a set period of time.
Ashe (アシェ)
Voiced by: Hina Tachibana (Japanese); Amanda Huerta (English)
A servant of the Lou family.

==== House of Zoa ====
Growley (グロウリィ, Gurourii)
Voiced by: Takehito Koyasu (Japanese); Tyson Rinehart (English)
The head of the Zoa family. He uses a wheelchair.
Lord Mask (仮面卿, Kamen Kyō)
Voiced by: Hikaru Midorikawa (Japanese); Kellen Goff (English)
The acting head of the Zoa family. His real name is On Zoa Nebulis (オン・ゾア・ネビュリス, On Zoa Nebyurisu).
Kissing Zoa Nebulis IX (キッシング・ゾア・ネビュリス9世, Kisshingu Zoa Nebyurisu 9-sei)
Voiced by: Konomi Kohara (Japanese); Bryn Apprill (English)
A purebred member of the Zoa family. She has the power to deconstruct and reconstruct matter.

==== House of Hydra ====
Talisman (タリスマン, Tarisuman)
Voiced by: Ryōtarō Okiayu (Japanese); Bradley Gareth (English)
The head of the Hydra family.
Vichyssoise Alek Hydra (ヴィソワーズ・アレク・ヒュドラ, Visowāzu Areku Hyudora)
Voiced by: Rie Takahashi (Japanese); Madeleine Morris (English)
A member of the Hydra family who is an inquisitor.
Mizerhyby Hydra Nebulis IX (ミゼルヒビィ・ヒュドラ・ネビュリス9世, Mizeruhibyi Hyudora Nebyurisu 9-sei)
Voiced by: Kaede Hondo (Japanese); Katie Wetch (English)
A purebred member of the Hydra family who is Talisman's niece.
Grugell (グリューゲル, Guryūgeru)
Voiced by: Yū Kobayashi (Japanese); Morgan Berry (English)
An elderly witch who is known as the "Midnight Sun Witch". She is capable of creating blizzards and golems made of snow.

=== Other characters ===
Crosswell Nes Lubigate (クロスウェル・ネス・リビュゲート, Kurosuweru Nesu Ribyugēto)
Voiced by: Kohsuke Toriumi (Japanese); Ivan Jasso (English)
The former wielder of the astral swords who is Iska and Jhin's mentor.
Salinger (サリンジャー, Sarinjā)
Voiced by: Toshihiko Seki (Japanese); Daman Mills (English)
A criminal who is imprisoned for attacking the previous queen.

== Media ==
=== Light novel ===
Our Last Crusade or the Rise of a New World is written by Kei Sazane and illustrated by Ao Nekonabe. The first light novel volume was published on May 20, 2017, by Fujimi Shobo under their Fujimi Fantasia Bunko imprint. As of October 2024, sixteen volumes and three short story collections have been published. Yen Press has acquired the license for the series in North America and published the first volume on September 24, 2019.

==== Volumes ====
No.	Original release date	Original ISBN	English release date	English ISBN
1	May 20, 2017	978-4-04-072307-5	September 24, 2019	978-1-9753-8545-3
2	July 20, 2017	978-4-04-072308-2	December 31, 2019	978-1-9753-0573-4
3	December 20, 2017	978-4-04-072518-5	April 28, 2020	978-1-9753-0575-8
4	April 20, 2018	978-4-04-072519-2	September 29, 2020	978-1-9753-0577-2
5	August 18, 2018	978-4-04-072866-7	December 29, 2020	978-1-9753-0579-6
6	December 20, 2018	978-4-04-072867-4	April 20, 2021	978-1-9753-2208-3
7	September 20, 2019	978-4-04-073179-7	October 12, 2021	978-1-9753-2210-6
8	December 20, 2019	978-4-04-073181-0	March 15, 2022	978-1-9753-2212-0
9	April 17, 2020	978-4-04-073182-7	June 28, 2022	978-1-9753-2214-4
SF	July 17, 2020	978-4-04-073730-0	July 18, 2023	978-1-9753-4429-0
10	October 17, 2020	978-4-04-073729-4	November 22, 2022	978-1-9753-4306-4
SF 2	December 19, 2020	978-4-04-073731-7	April 16, 2024	978-1-9753-4431-3
11	May 20, 2021	978-4-04-074077-5	March 21, 2023	978-1-9753-4308-8
12	October 20, 2021	978-4-04-074078-2	November 21, 2023	978-1-9753-5026-0
13	March 19, 2022	978-4-04-074443-8	July 23, 2024	978-1-9753-7005-3
SF 3	August 20, 2022	978-4-04-074617-3	December 17, 2024	978-1-9753-7251-4
14	December 20, 2022	978-4-04-074444-5	May 20, 2025	979-8-8554-0520-0
15	June 20, 2023	978-4-04-074980-8	November 25, 2025	979-8-8554-0522-4
16	October 19, 2024	978-4-04-074981-5	July 14, 2026	979-8-8554-2196-5

=== Manga ===
A manga adaptation of the series by Okama was serialized in Hakusensha's Young Animal magazine from May 11, 2018, to March 12, 2021. Seven tankōbon volumes were published from December 26, 2018, to April 28, 2021. Yen Press also licensed the manga for North American release, and released it from November 5, 2019, to October 24, 2023.

==== Volumes ====
No.	Original release date	Original ISBN	English release date	English ISBN
1	December 26, 2018	978-4-592-16301-5	November 5, 2019	978-1-9753-5870-9
2	May 29, 2019	978-4-592-16302-2	May 5, 2020	978-1-9753-0837-7
3	December 26, 2019	978-4-592-16303-9	October 27, 2020	978-1-9753-1565-8
4	July 29, 2020	978-4-592-16304-6	December 13, 2022	978-1-9753-2264-9
5	September 29, 2020	978-4-592-16305-3	March 21, 2023	978-1-9753-4553-2
6	December 25, 2020	978-4-592-16306-0	June 20, 2023	978-1-9753-4823-6
7	April 28, 2021	978-4-592-16307-7	October 24, 2023	978-1-9753-4992-9

=== Anime ===
An anime television series adaptation was announced at the "Fantasia Bunko Dai Kanshasai 2019" event on October 20, 2019. The series was animated by Silver Link and directed by Shin Oonuma and Mirai Minato, with Kento Shimoyama handling series composition and Kaori Sato as character designer and chief animation director. Seima Iwahashi, Ryōta Tomura, and Ryūichirō Fujinaga of Elements Garden composed the series' music. The series aired from October 7 to December 23, 2020, on AT-X and other channels. Kaori Ishihara performed the opening theme "Against.", while Sora Amamiya performed the ending theme "Koori no Torikago" (氷の鳥籠; "Ice Bird Cage"). (Note: "Koori no Torikago" is used as an insert song in episode 21.)

Funimation acquired the series and streamed it on its website in North America and Britain and Ireland, and on AnimeLab in Australia and New Zealand. On October 27, 2020, Funimation announced that the series would receive an English dub, which premiered the following day. Following Sony's acquisition of Crunchyroll, the series was moved to Crunchyroll.

A sequel was green-lit on October 1, 2021, which was later revealed to be a second season. It was animated by Silver Link and Studio Palette, and directed by Yuki Inaba, with Studio Palette credited for series composition, Kaori Yoshihara designing the characters, and Elements Garden composing the music. It was initially scheduled for 2023, but was later delayed, and eventually aired from July 10, 2024, to June 26, 2025. The opening theme song is "Senaka Awase" (セナカアワセ; "Back to Back") performed by AliA, while the ending theme song is "Para Bellum", performed by Sizuk. Crunchyroll is streaming the series. Plus Media Networks Asia licensed the series in Southeast Asia, broadcasting it on Aniplus Asia.

On August 6, 2024, it was announced that the fifth and future episodes of the second season would be delayed indefinitely, with the reasoning being "to maintain the quality" of the production. In its place, selected episodes from the first season occupied the remainder of its broadcast. The season restarted airing on April 10, 2025, with the first new episode airing on May 8 of the same year.

A third season was announced during the "Fantasia Bunko Grand Thanksgiving Festival 2026 Online" event on October 25, 2026. The cast and staff from previous seasons will reprise their roles.

== See also ==
- Gods' Games We Play, another light novel series by the same author
- Why Does Nobody Remember Me in This World?, another light novel series by the same author
