= Seiichi Hishikawa =

Japanese film maker

Seiichi Hishikawa (菱川 勢一, Hishikawa Seiichi; born in 1969 in Tokyo) is a Japanese film maker, art director, and photographer who began his career in the music industry. He entered CBS/Sony Group in the General Affairs section, General Affairs division, and eventually moved on to the Sony Corporation. PR/Advertising division, overseeing a great number of events at the Ginza Sony Building etc. as an assistant producer. This was also the time that he began producing exhibitions for creators of contemporary art as well as artists.

In 1991, Hishikawa moved to New York and moved from music to film, as an editing engineer as well as a cinematographer, gaining experience in media including TV and movies. After returning to Japan, he gained experience as a freelance set director, cinematographer, and theatre director before establishing Drawing and Manual, a company that does graphic design and film. That same year, he hosted a motion graphics exhibition at the Axis Gallery in Roppongi, leading the motion graphics movement and attracting a total of 45,000 visitors despite being self-hosted. Known as the founder of that movement, Hishikawa established his own design studio in 2003, Standard Series, Inc. Expanding on the cinema, web, and graphic design work he has done up until now, the company also provides brand design and design consultation services. In 2009, Hishikawa joined Drawing and Manual again, and he accepted a position to teach in the Department of Science of Design, Musashino Art University. He achieved the triple crown in 2011 after taking top honors in the Cannes Lions International Advertising Festival for directing the NTT Docomo commercial “Xylophone.”

== Awards ==
- New York ADC 2000
- London International Advertising 2001
- IBA International Broadcast 2002
- iF Design Award - Atmosphere (3 divisions in total)
- Asia Pacific Advertising Festival Bronze 2008
- One Show Interactive Merit 2009
- Cannes Lions International Advertising Festival Film Lions-Silver, Film Craft Lions-Gold, Cyber Lions-Gold 2011

== Personal life ==
Seiichi has two children. His eldest son, Taichi Hishikawa is also a filmmaker. And his youngest daughter, Hana Hishikawa who is the voice actress.
