= BNK48 =

Thai girl group

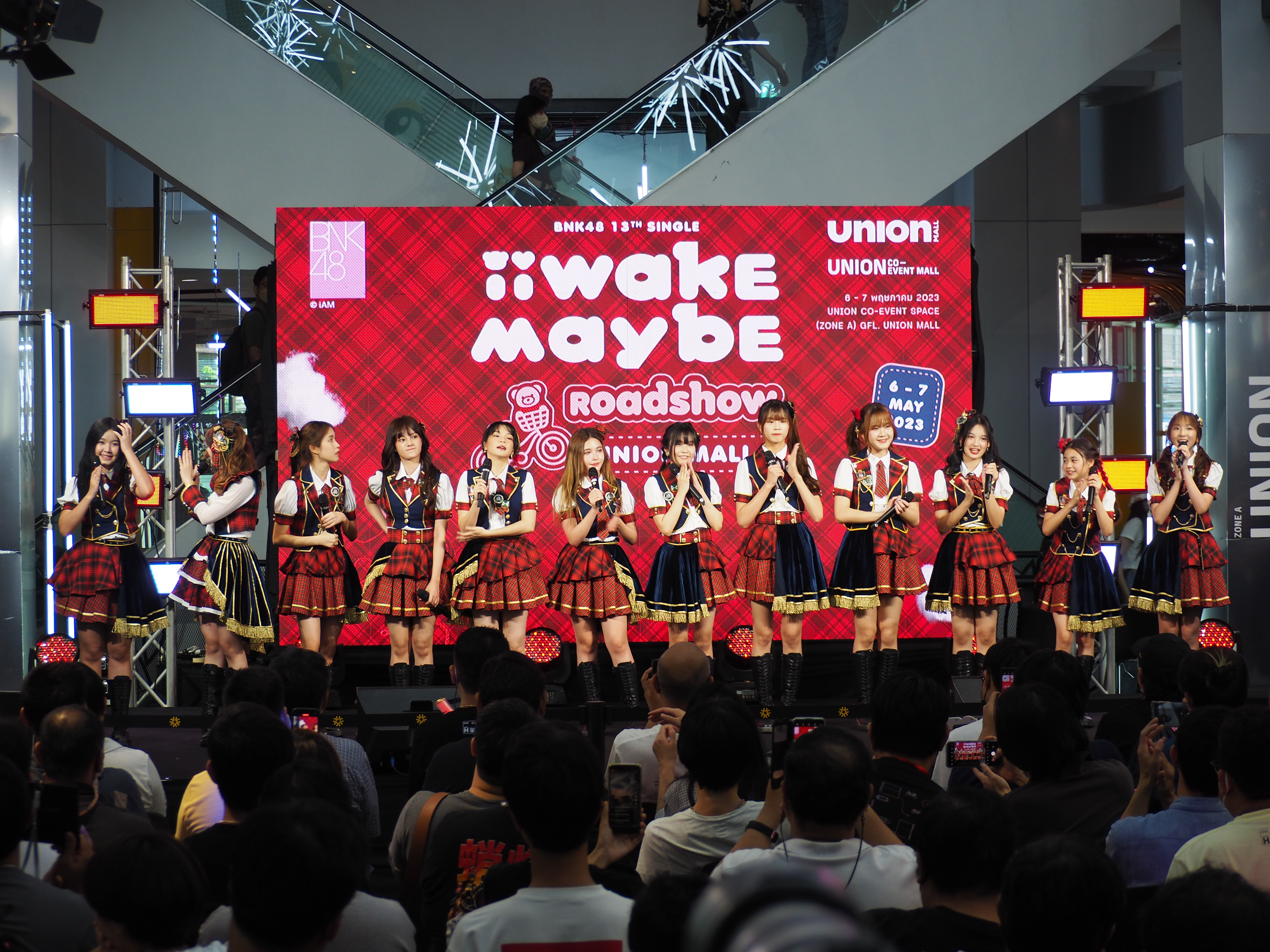
- BNK48 in 2023

Background information
- Origin: Bangkok, Thailand
- Genres: Teen-pop; J-pop; T-pop; Bubblegum Pop
- Years active: 2017–present
- Label: independent Artist Management (iAM)
- Member of: AKB48 Group
- Members: 38 (list)
- Past members: 49 (list)
- Website: bnk48.com

BNK48 (pronounced B.N.K. Forty-eight) is a Thai idol girl group and the third international sister group of Japan's AKB48, following Indonesia's JKT48 and China's SNH48 (Former).

After holding its first audition in mid-2016 and announcing its first-generation members in early 2017, the group officially debuted on 2 June 2017 and released the debut single, "Aitakatta", on 8 August 2017. Its second single, "Koisuru Fortune Cookie", released on 20 December 2017, was a great success. As of November 2026, the group has 40 members.

The group is named after Bangkok, the capital city of Thailand, where its theatre, BNK48 the Campus, is located. Orchid, a flower popular in the country, serves as both the colour and motif of the group.

BNK48 announced the formation of their first sister group, CGM48 (named after the city of Chiang Mai), on 2 June 2019. CGM48 is the first domestic sister group to be launched outside Japan and second sister group of 48 Group in Thailand.

== History ==
=== 2016 ===
BNK48 Official Logo

On 26 March 2016, the formation of BNK48, MNL48, and TPE48 was announced.

The first BNK48 audition was held from 29 July to 31 August 2016, attracting a total of 1,357 applicants, of whom 330 were selected on 5 September. The initial selection of the first-generation members was later held on 17 and 18 September 2016. On 23 September 2016, the selection result was declared, stating that 80 candidates would pass into the final selection. However, due to the death of King Bhumibol Adulyadej on 13 October 2016, the final selection was postponed until 18 December, on which a number of candidates were selected as the first generation of the group.

=== 2017 ===
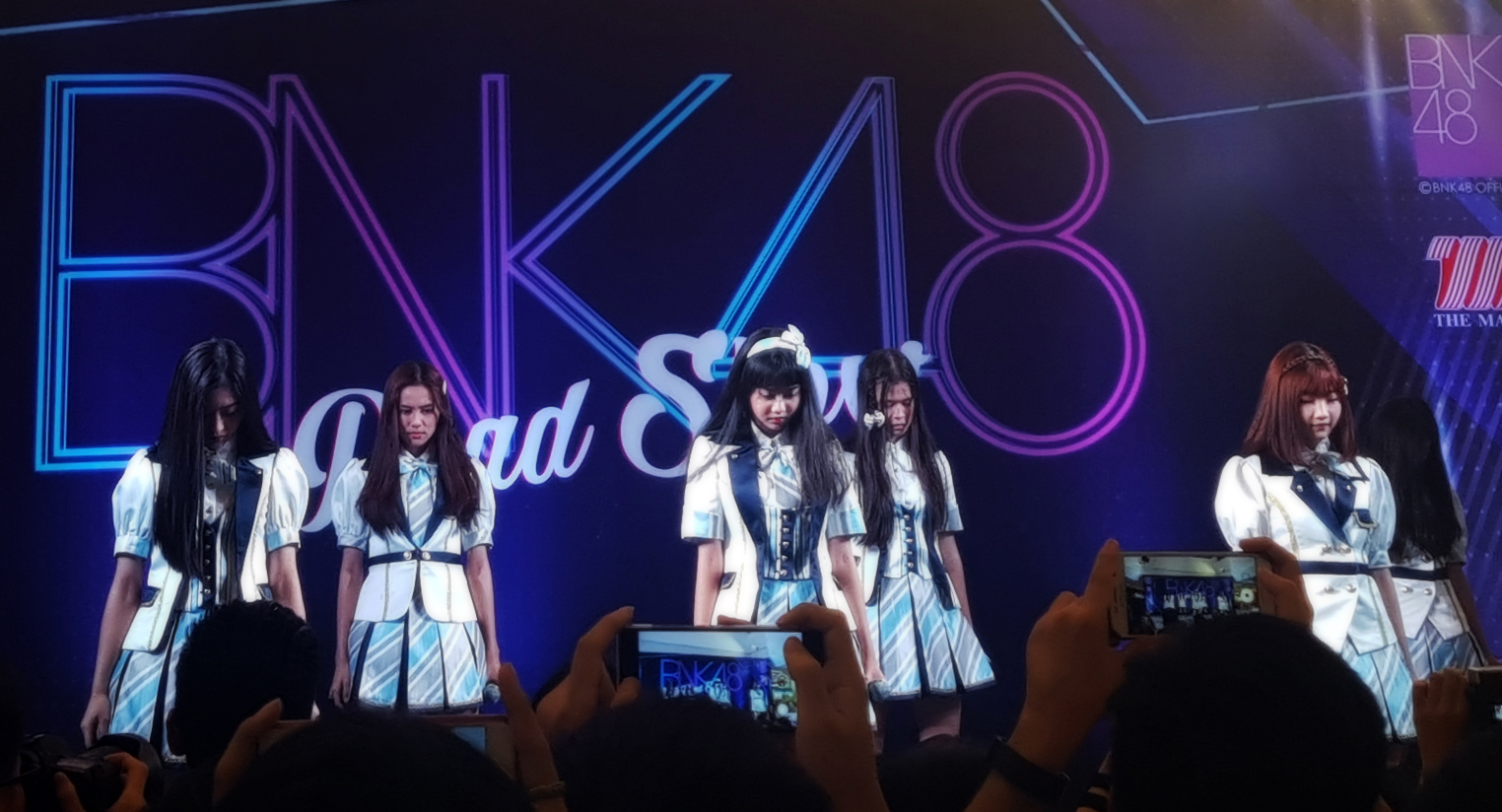
Members Jennis, Namneung, Maysa, Namhom, Kaimook, and Miori, clad in the first single outfit, perform at The Mall Bang Kapi in Bangkok on 23 July 2017.

On 12 February 2017, the first generation of the group was officially announced, consisting of 29 members. They made their first appearance at the AKB48 show during the 12th Japan Festa in Bangkok on the same day.

It was later revealed on 13 April 2017 that AKB48 Team 4 member Rina Izuta would be transferred to the group on 2 July 2017, totalling the members of the group to 35.

On 2 June 2017, the group made its official debut with the single "Aitakatta – Yak Cha Dai Phop Thoe". The single was officially released on 8 August 2017 and was available for purchase for a limited period of time only, during which it sold 13,500 copies. So far, no official music video has been released for the single.

The group, representing Japan, performed with Thai singer Palitchoke Ayanaputra and the South Korean band iKON at the concert 2017: 411 Fandom Party in Bangkok, held at Siam Paragon on the night of 30 August 2017, during which it premiered the song "Khukki Siangthai", a cover of AKB48's "Koi Suru Fortune Cookie".

On 31 August 2017, an announcement was made saying that due to their violation of undisclosed rules, Jan, Kaew, Orn, and Namneung, the oldest members of the group who were scheduled to perform at the Japan Expo in Thailand 2017 on 1 and 3 September 2017, were demoted to undergirls and replaced by Jane, Mobile, Pupe, and Rina Izuta for the said event. It was speculated that the four were punished for truancy.

At the Japan Expo, the group performed "Khukki Siangthai" with World Order during the opening ceremony and unveiled its eponymous anthem, "BNK48 (Bangkok48)", which depicts tourist spots and foods of Bangkok.

The group held its first formal concert, BNK48 We Love You, on 23 September 2017 at The EmQuartier in Bangkok to mark the graduation of Kidcat. At the event, the release of the song "Khukki Siangthai" as the group's second single was announced. The music video for the song was premiered at the concert BNK48 Mini Live and Handshake, held at J.J Mall in Bangkok on 18 November 2017.

On 24 December 2017, the first team of the group, Team BIII, was announced at a fan convention called BNK48 We Wish You, held at Siam Square One in Bangkok. At the same event, it was also revealed that the group's first theatrical performance would be held in April 2018, the group's second generation audition would be commenced as from 25 December 2017, and the song "Shonichi" will be the group's third single.

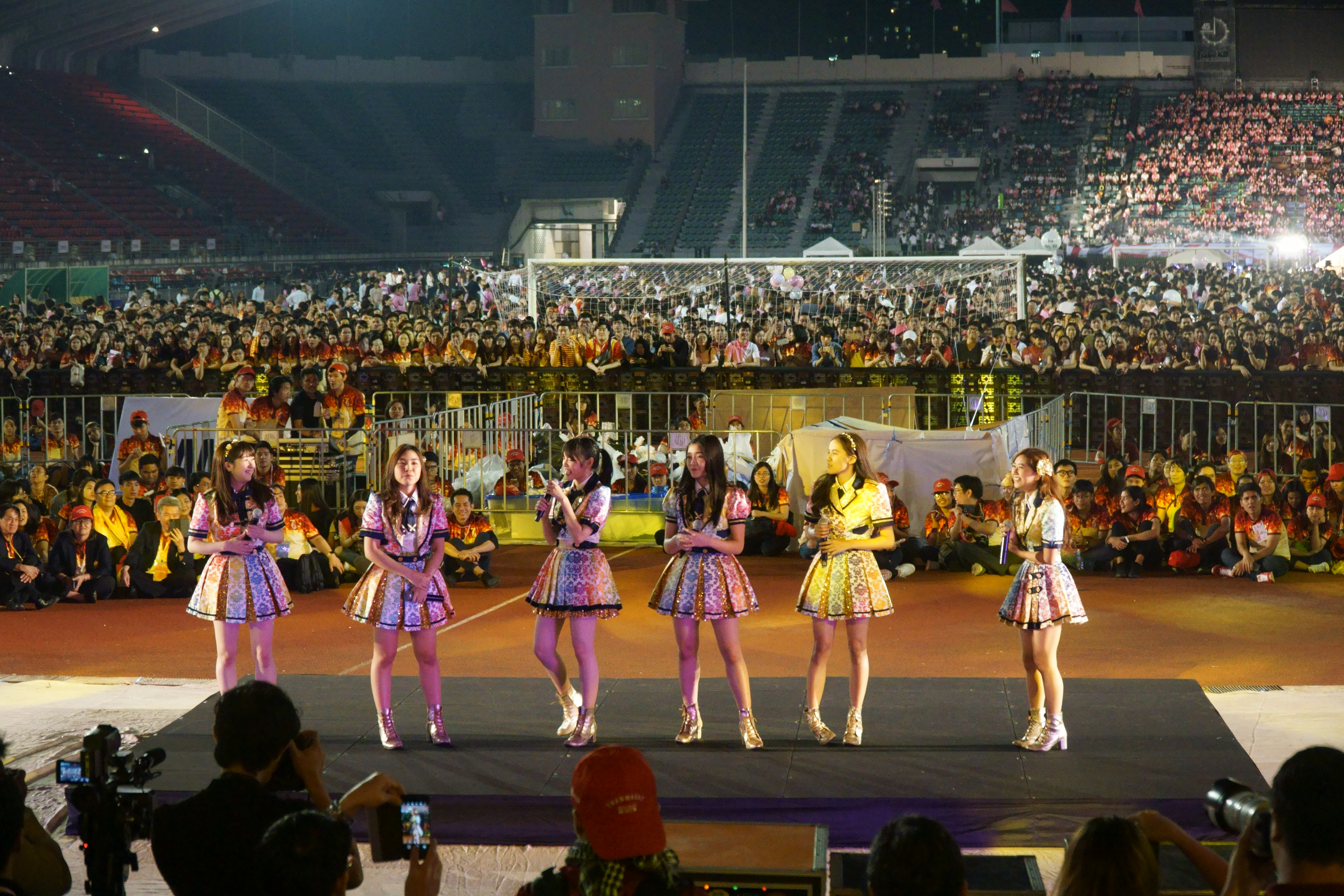
Members Izurina, Tarwaan, Cherprang, Jennis, Namneung, and Miori at the 72nd Chula–Thammasat Traditional Football Match on 3 February 2018.

=== 2018 ===
At the third handshake event of the group, held at The Mall Ngam Wongwang in Bangkok on 13 and 14 January 2018, additional songs were announced as the B-side tracks for this single, that is, "Namida Surprise!" and "Anata to Christmas Eve".

The group performed at the 72nd Chula–Thammasat Traditional Football Match on 3 February 2018. It also held a handshake and mini live event outside Bangkok for the first time from 2 to 4 February 2018 at Central Festival Chiang Mai. On 11 February 2018, the group was selected as the brand ambassador of True Corporation's Truemove H in the project TruePoint x BNK48.

The group carried out an audition for its second-generation members from February to April 2018. Ninety-four of the total candidates passed the initial round on 20 March 2018 and twenty-seven of them were finally announced as the second-generation members on 29 April 2018.

On 28 February 2018, the group was selected as the official Thailand national football team supporters.

The group held its first concert, called Starto, at BITEC on 31 March and 1 April 2018.

On 24 April 2018, the group had an audience with military junta chief Prayut Chan-o-cha at the Government House, where the group held a live-broadcast handshake event with the general. The event is seen by scholars as the junta's attempt to build popularity amongst young people for the upcoming election. But the group's company denied any political purpose behind the meeting, saying the event was just for promoting a government radio station.

The first album of the group, River, was announced on 31 May 2018.

In December 2018, BNK48 was invited to perform together with AKB48 in the 69th NHK Kōhaku Uta Gassen (第69回NHK紅白歌合戦, The 69th NHK Red & White Song Battle).

=== 2019–present ===
On 26 January 2019, BNK48 held BNK48 6th Single Senbatsu General Election, the group's first event where fans can vote for their favorite members to be selected as the sixth single's lineup. The first place (most voted candidate) was Cherprang who became the center of the sixth single. On 2 March 2019, the sixth single "Beginner" was premiered. On 7 April 2019, the group announced their second album, Jabaja will be released in July 2019. On 2 June 2019, the group announced their first domestic sister group CGM48, which is named after Chiang Mai where it will be based.

On 19 April 2020, BNK48 announced the results of their second election event BNK48 9th Single Senbatsu General Election, the first place was Jane who became the center of the ninth single. On 26 July 2020, the ninth single "Heavy Rotation" was premiered. On 9 August 2020, the group announced 19 third-generation members. On 26 September 2020, Gygee won the BNK48 JANKEN Tournament 2020 – The Senbatsu of Destiny, the group's first event that members will be selected as third album's lineup by rock paper scissors competition. On 29 November 2020, the group announced their third album, Warota People will be released in January 2021.

On 2 June 2021, the tenth single "D-AAA" which is the group's first original song was premiered. On 20 March 2022, the eleventh single "Sayonara Crawl" was premiered. On 9 April 2022, Mobile was the winner of BNK48's third election event BNK48 12th Single Senbatsu General Election, making her became the center of the twelfth single. On 28 August 2022, the twelfth single "Believers" was premiered. On 30 October 2022, the group announced 11 fourth-generation members. On 26 February 2023, the thirteenth single "Iiwake Maybe" was premiered. On 9 April 2023, Angel won the BNK48 JANKEN Tournament 2023 – The Senbatsu of Destiny, becoming the center of the fourth album. On 10 August 2023, the fourth album Gingham Check was released.

== Sub-units ==
=== Mimigumo ===
Mimigumo was BNK48's first sub-unit, debuting on September 1, 2019 and featuring Jaa, Kaimook and Music. They officially ceased to exist once all three members graduated in late 2022.

=== QRRA ===
QRRA (pronounced like "Car-ra") is BNK48's second sub-unit. The group formerly performed under the name LYRA, consisted of 6 members who were chosen to be trained by Universal Music Thailand and debuted on October 7, 2020. The group was later renamed VYRA on March 12, 2021. On September 27, 2022, the group was renamed QRRA and currently has 5 members.

== Management ==
=== Managing entities ===
The group is managed by a specifically established company called BNK48 Office. On 7 November 2019, BNK48 Office was renamed independent Artist Management (iAM) in order to be more focused on talent management.

BNK48 Office is presided over by Jirath Pavaravadhana (Thai: จิรัฐ บวรวัฒนะ). Cherprang Areekul (Thai: เฌอปราง อารีย์กุล) is currently serving as the manager (shihainin) of the group after Jirath's younger brother, Nataphol Pavaravadhana (Thai: ณัฐพล บวรวัฒนะ) and Saowani Kanjanaolarnsiri (Thai: เสาวณีย์ กาญจนโอฬารศิริ).

The proportion of shares in BNK48 Office on 18 April 2018 was as follows: Jirath's company Rose Artist Management held 69.8050%, a Chinese businesswoman held 15.1950%, AKB48's company AKS held 15%, and Jirath himself held 0.0001%. It was reported on 23 May 2018 that 35% of the shares were sold to the media conglomerate Plan B Media at the price of ฿182,280,000.

On 11 June 2018, another company was created, called BNK Production, in which Workpoint Entertainment holds 50% of the shares, BNK48 Office holds 49.99% of the shares, and BNK48 Office CEO Jirath holds 0.01% of the shares. According to an explanatory sheet, the company is intended for production of television and online shows and for organisation of events and concerts.

=== Financing ===
According to BNK48 Office CEO Jirath Pavaravadhana, the group's primary sources of revenue would be commercial products, appearances at commercial events, and sponsors. The group is also financed by the Cool Japan Fund.

Jirath also said that the company would invest ฿200,000,000 for the group during the years 2017–2018 and expects to regain the invested capital by 2019.

At the end of the fiscal year 2017, the group gained ฿40,549,323.58 income and bore ฿62,582,979.24 expense, resulting in a ฿22,298,366.99 loss.

=== Contracts ===
Each member of the group is subject to a six-year contract that can be renewed.

== Promotion ==
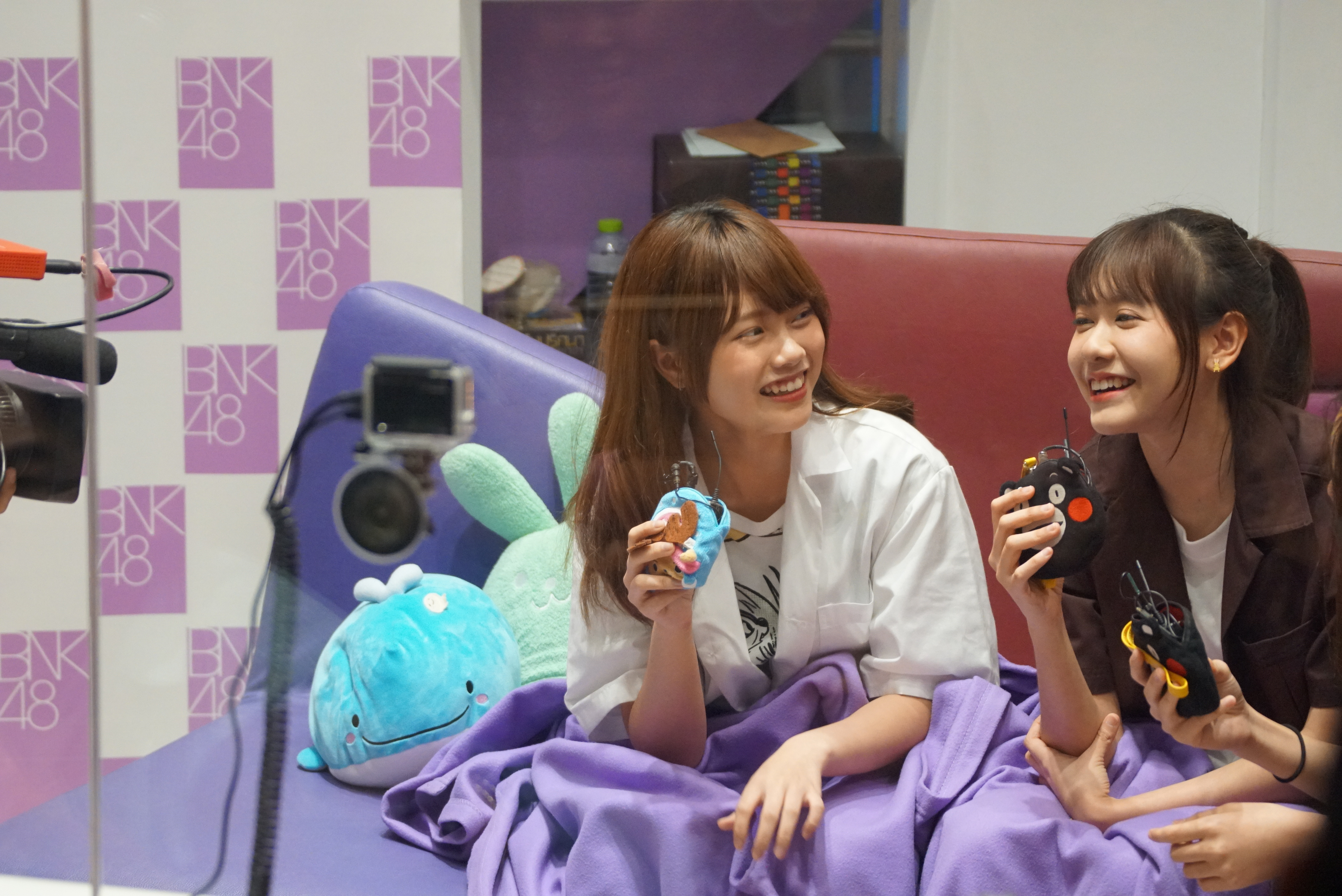
Music and Noey during a live session at The EmQuartier digital studio on 13 December 2017.

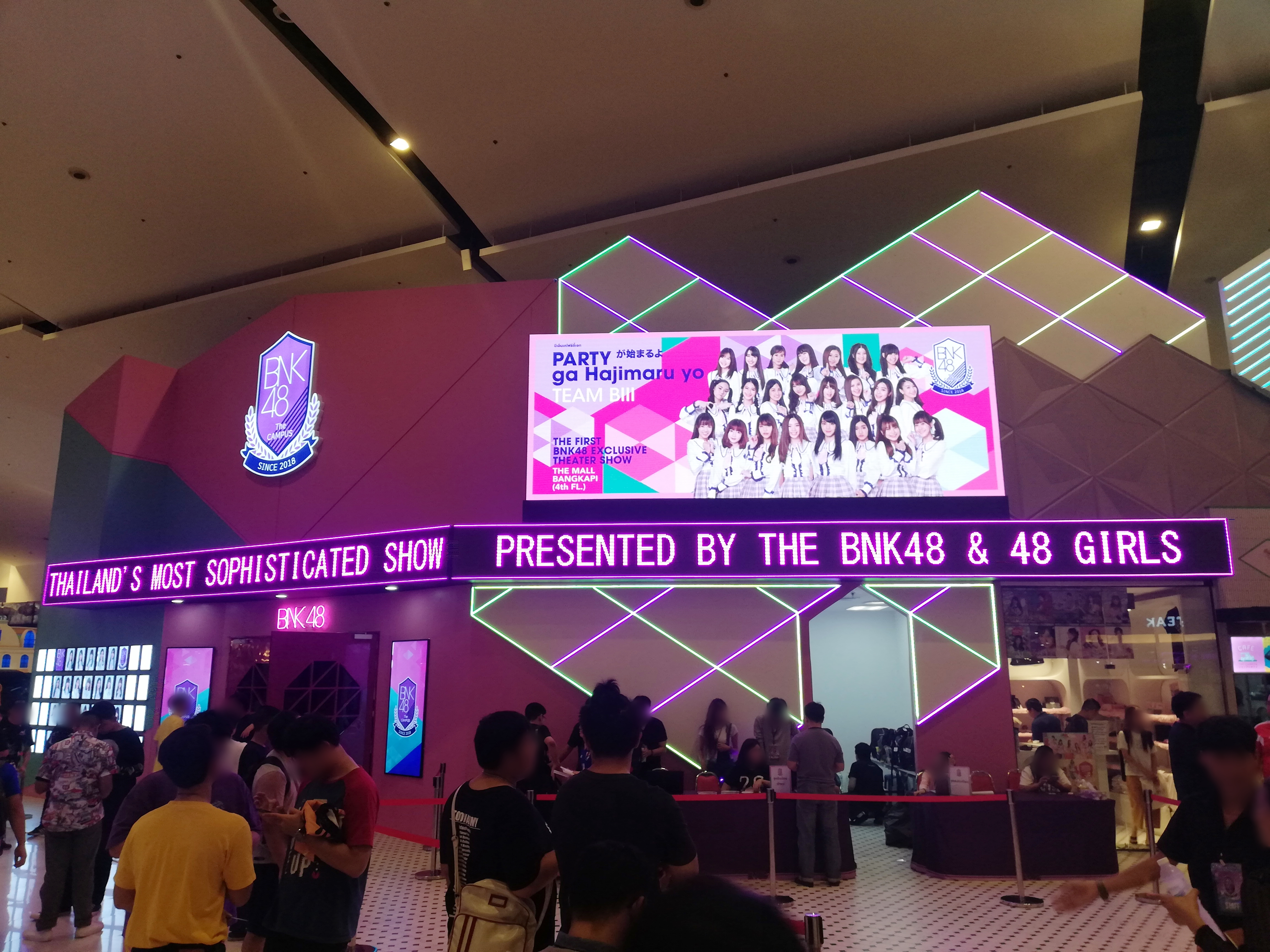
BNK48 the Campus, the official theatre, shop, and café of the group, situated on the fourth floor of The Mall Bang Kapi.

=== Shows and events ===
The group has its own digital studio, colloquially known as "Fish Tank" (Thai: ตู้ปลา), at The EmQuartier, where its members periodically make a live appearance on Facebook and YouTube holding discussions on various topics.

Each member of the group also appears live through the broadcasting application VOOV every night.

In mid 2017, the group held roadshows every weekend at The Mall Group shopping malls.

To support its debut single, the group held its first handshake event in Bangkok on 27 August 2017. The event attracted almost 4,000 fans. The second handshake event took place on 18 November 2017 in Bangkok and drew almost 5,000 fans.

Also, the group has launched its own television shows, such as BNK48 Senpai, a 13-episode-long documentary aired every Tuesday, Wednesday, and Thursday, from 1 March 2017, and BNK48 Show, a 26-episode-long variety show aired every Sunday from 9 July 2017, both broadcast by Channel 3.

=== Theatre ===
The group has its own theatre in Bangkok, where it performs three times a week: Saturday, 13:00 hrs and 17:00 hrs; and Sunday, 17:00 hrs.

The theatre, named "BNK48 the Campus", is located on the fourth floor of The Mall Bang Kapi, occupying a 1,000-m^{2} area. It accommodates 350 people and includes a shop, a café, and an office within its precincts.

The group did a theatrical performance for the press at the theatre on 26 April 2018, and the theatre was inaugurated on 11 May 2018. A Buddhist housewarming ritual, presided over by nine monks from Wat Traimit Witthayaram, was held for the theatre on 4 July 2018. Despite the ritual, the theatre is reportedly haunted.

The first theatrical performance of the group, known as the first stage, is titled Party ga Hajimaru Yo, or Party Nai Fan (Thai: ปาร์ตีในฝัน; "Party in Dream") in Thai.

=== Image ===
The members of the group are often promoted as good role models for the youth. Some believe that the most appealing aspect of the group comes from the members' personalities themselves and not from their talents. On the other hand, the fact that most of the fans are adult men, as opposed to the members who are still teenage girls, is considered an unusual image in the Thai culture.

=== Philanthropy ===
During the roadshow in the beach town Hua Hin on 6 August 2017, eight autographed photos of members were auctioned off to raise money for flood victims in Northeastern Thailand. The auction fetched over ฿200,000.

== Discography ==
- RIVER (2018)
- Jabaja (2019)
- Warota People (2021)
- Gingham Check (2023)
- #SukiNanda (2024)
- Ponytail to Shushu (2026)

== Honours ==
The group was announced as the Person of the Year by Voice TV on 20 December 2017.

== Awards and nominations ==
Year	Award(s)	Category	For	Result
2018	Thailand Zocial Awards	Best Group Artist on Social Media		Won
2018	The Guitar Mag Awards	New Wave of the Year		Nominated
2018	The Guitar Mag Awards	Single Hit of the Year	"Khukki Siangthai"	Won
2018	JOOX Thailand Music Awards	New Face Artist of the Year		Won
2018	MThai Top Talk-About	Top Talk-About Artist		Won
2018	Press Award	Best Artist		Won
2018	Kazz Awards	Song of the Year	"Khukki Siangthai"	Nominated
2018	Kazz Awards	Best New Artist		Won
2018	Kazz Awards	Popular Vote		Nominated
2018	Nine Entertain Awards	Song of the Year	"Khukki Siangthai"	Nominated
2018	Nine Entertain Awards	Popularity Award		Nominated
2018	Siamdara Star Awards	Top Group Artist		Won
2018	Siamdara Star Awards	Hit song	"Khukki Siangthai"	Won
2018	Maya Awards	Most Popular Group Artist of the Year		Won
2019	Thailand Social Awards	Artist groups with outstanding results on social media		Won
2019	Bioscope Awards	New artists to watch		Won
2019	Home Awards	People Choice (Female)		Won
2019	Kom Chad Luek Award	Popular Thai international singers		Nominated
2019	Kazz Award	Most Popular Female Artists	Kimi wa Melody	Nominated
2019	Kazz Award	Popular Vote		Nominated
2019	Kazz Award	Beloved KAZZ Magazine (Female)		Won
2019	Daily Star Award	Popular vote for women		Nominated
2019	Daily Star Award	Best TV Show of the Year	Victory BNK48	Nominated
2019	Daily Star Award	Most female singers of the year	Kimi wa Melody	Nominated
2019	Daily Star Award	Hot Girl of the Year		Nominated
2019	LINE Stickers Awards	Public heart sticker		Won
2021	Suphannahong National Film Awards			
2021	Suphannahong National Film Awards	The Best Movie	Where We Belong	Won
2021	Suphannahong National Film Awards	Best Supporting Actress	Praewa Suthamphong	Won
2021	Kom Chad Luek Award			
2021	Kom Chad Luek Award	Popular Thai Movies	Thii Ban x BNK48	Won
2021	Kom Chad Luek Award	Most Popular Actress	Praewa Suthamphong	Won

== Sister groups ==
Sisters group of BNK48

CGM48 (named after and based in Chiang Mai) is the first domestic sister group of BNK48 and the ninth international sister group of AKB48. The group was announced at a BNK48 event held in Chiang Mai on 2 June 2019.
