= Milin Watinthanakit =

Thai singer (born 1996)

Milin Watinthanakit มิลิญ วาทินธนะกิจ
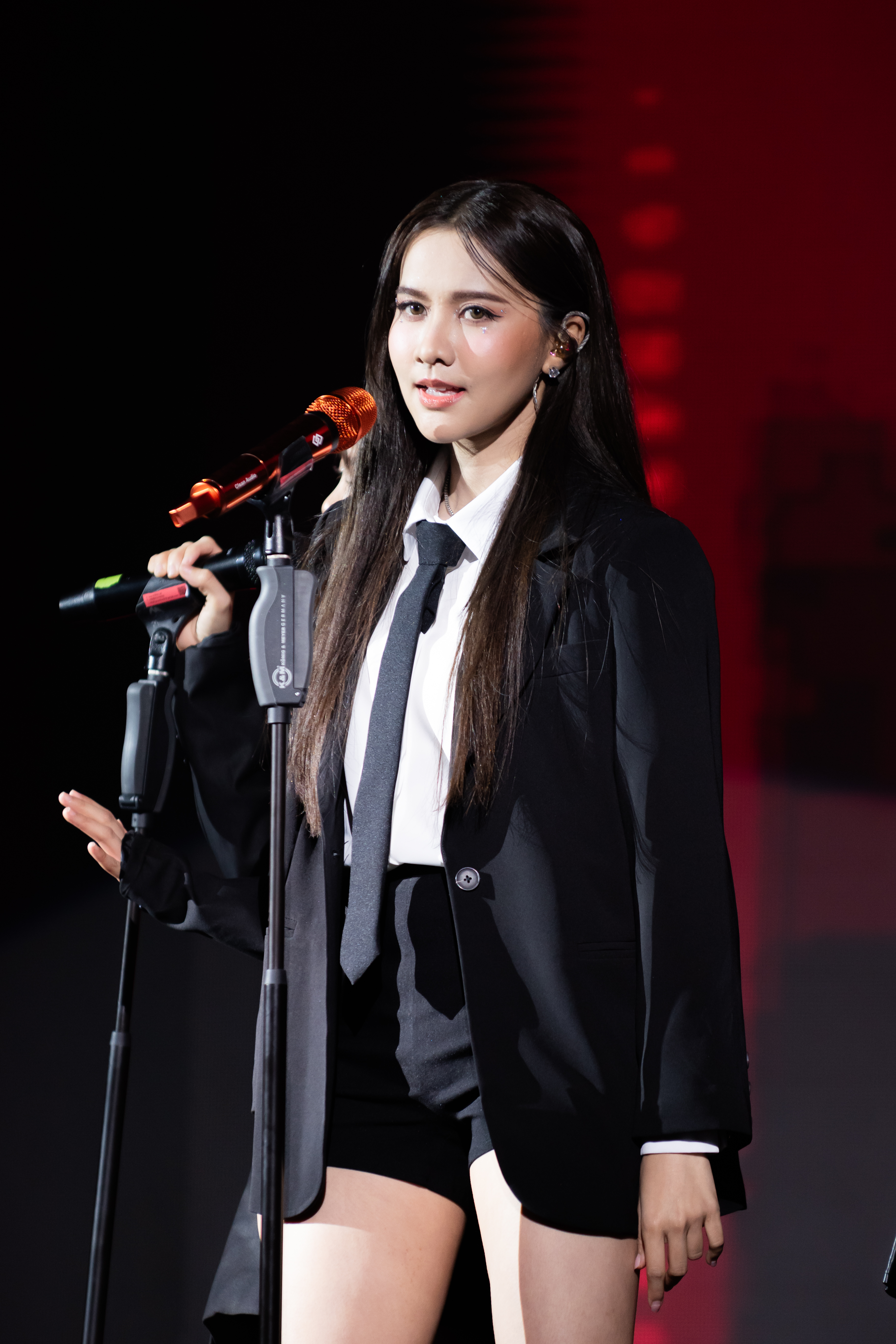
- Namneung in 2023

Background information
- Also known as: Namneung (น้ำหนึ่ง)
- Born: Milin Dokthian (มิลิน ดอกเทียน); 11 November 1996 (age 30); Sing Buri, Thailand
- Genres: Thai pop; J-pop
- Occupations: Entertainer; Idol; Singer; Actress; YouTuber
- Years active: 2017–present
- Labels: BNK48 Office (2017–2019) iAM (2019–2022); INC Entertainment (2022–Present)
- Formerly of: BNK48

Milin Watinthanakit (Thai: มิลิญ วาทินธนะกิจ, IPA: [mí.lin waː tʰintʰanakìt]; born 11 November 1996), formerly Milin Dokthian (Thai: มิลิน ดอกเทียน, IPA: [mí.lin dɔ̀ːk.tʰian]), also known as Namneung (น้ำหนึ่ง, IPA: [náːm.nɯ̀ŋ]), is a Thai actress and singer. She is a former member of the Thai idol group BNK48, an international sister group of the Japanese idol girl group AKB48. She is one of the first generation members of the group, initially promoted to BNK48 Team BIII. Then, after team shuffle in 2020, she became a member of BNK48 Team NV.

== Biography ==
Namneung has completed her undergraduate study at Thammasat University, majored in environmental science. Because of what she has studied, she appears several times in newspaper articles giving interview about her opinion on environmental issues.

After leaving BNK48 in 2022, she has since continued with a solo singing and acting career under INC Entertainment. She started her own YouTube channel, Milin D., and also co-founded a channel named SERTIST with Kaew, Mobile (Mobye), and Pupe.

== BNK48 ==
Namneung began her journey to becoming an idol by participating in various auditions. She auditioned for the group Sweat16 (appeared in the group's documentary), but was not selected. After that, in July 2016, she participated in another audition and was chosen as a member of the first generation of BNK48, where she first started as a trainee (Kenkyuusei).

During the event BNK48 The Debut, on June 2, 2017, it was announced that she had been selected as one of the Senbatsu (performing members) for the group's first single, "Aitakatta". Later that year, at the BNK48 WE WISH YOU! A Merry Christmas Fan Meet event, she was promoted to BNK48 Team BIII. In the team's first theater performance, titled Party ga Hajimaru Yo, she performed in the song "Classmate". After the team shuffle in 2020, she became a member of BNK48 Team NV and performed "Arashi no Yoru ni wa" in the team's first theater performance, Theater no Megami.

In March 2017, she participated in Fukuoka Asia Collection (FACo) along with Cherprang and Cancan.

In early 2018, she was selected as the representative for Thammasat University in the 72nd Chula-Thammasat Traditional Football Match.

On August 29, 2019, Namneung, along with three other members of the group, engaged in the press conference for the "Discover Thailand's Astronauts Scholarship Program 2019". It was later revealed that the four BNK48 members would travel to the United States to join the program. However, due to the COVID-19 pandemic, the plan was postponed.

Namneung announced her graduation on November 13, 2022, on her birthday stage performance (BNK48 Team NV 1st Stage "Theater no Megami" Namneung's Birthday Stage). Her graduation stage was on December 2, 2022. It was held as a group graduation stage together with Noey, Orn, Tarwaan, Kaew, Mobile, and Pupe.

=== BNK48 Charaline ===
Namneung is a part of the group's special unit "Charaline", together with Noey, Orn, Tarwaan, and Kaew. During a BNK48 Digital Live Studio livestream in late November 2021, the group announced that the unit will release a special project named "BNK48 Charaline Verb of Feeling", where each member of the unit performs a rearranged version of a BNK48 song. Her song is a reggae version of "High Tension", which was released on December 13, 2021. In addition to the project, they will also perform in their fan meeting event named "BNK48 Charaline 1st Fanmeet: Suphap Satri Chara Thepee Na Wang Weng Wi Wek Wi Weng Wong" on December 25–26, 2021. However, concerning the spread of the coronavirus in the country which was worsened in late 2021, the show was rescheduled to February 12–13, 2022 instead.

=== BNK48 Senbatsu General Elections ===
Namneung submitted her application form for the BNK48 6th Single Senbatsu General Election on October 19, 2018 with her own video on her Instagram account. The first preliminary results were announced on December 12, 2018. Namneung earned 6,893 votes, putting her in the 8th place. Unexpectedly, on January 12, 2019, the second preliminary results were announced in the middle of the BNK48 4th Single "Kimi wa Melody" Handshake Event and Namneung had fallen to the 13th place. On January 26, 2019, the day of the final announcement, Namneung had earned 28,134 votes, making her one of the performing members of the 6th single with the 10th place.

On December 24, 2019, Namneung submitted her application form for the BNK48 9th Single Senbatsu General Election. The first preliminary results were announced on February 14, 2020. Namneung was on the 5th place with 7,317 votes. Later, on March 10, 2020, the second preliminary results were announced and she had fallen to the 9th place. On April 19, 2020, the day of the final announcement, Namneung had earned 28,116 votes, making her one of the performing members of the 9th single with the 10th place. and she is a member whose rank remains unchanged compared to the previous general election.

Namneung submitted her application form for the BNK48 12th Single Senbatsu General Election on December 24, 2019. Her desired position is the 1st place. On March 11, 2022, the first preliminary results were announced and she was on the 2nd place with 10,544.14 tokens^{1} received. About two weeks later on March 24, 2022, her name was placed on he 4th place in the second preliminary results announcement. Finally, the final results were announced on April 9, 2022. Namneung remained in the 4th place with 89,341.03 tokens. She is now one of the performing members of the 12th single and a member of "Kami 7".

1: Instead of the usual voting system, this year the company implemented the blockchain system to give transparency to the voting procedure. Voting count is in the unit of "Token", which refers to "BNK Token" used in the poll.

=== BNK48 Janken Tournament 2020 - Senbatsu of Destiny ===
She also participated in the event, which took place on September 26, 2020. Her costume is a Likay costume with huge garlands made from banknotes with her own face printed on them. Although she has lost her first matchup against Nicha, a member of CGM48, she has been voted by other members to be one of the top three best costumes of the event (but in the end, Jennis won the award).

=== Brand ambassador ===
In 2018, Buriram United announced that Namneung will be their sole brand ambassador in 2019, along with the celebration of their 10th anniversary, thus making her the first brand ambassador of the soccer team in Thai League. Moreover, she has her own collaborated goods collection with Buriram United, named "Buriram United x Namneung BNK48" which has been on sale in the club's store since June 29, 2019. Buriram United has always been Namneung's favorite soccer team since several years ago and this is one of the reasons that the team had chosen her to be their first brand ambassador. In addition, she had once given an interview to FOX Sports Thailand in early 2018, and an official magazine from Changsuek (Thailand National Soccer Team) about her opinions on the club and the national soccer team.

=== Discography ===
==== BNK48 singles and albums ====
Year	No.	Album	Title	Notes
2017	1	River	"Aitakatta – Yak Cha Dai Phop Thoe"	Also sang "Ōgoe Diamond – Ko Chop Hai Ru Wa Chop" and "365 Nichi no Kamihikōki – Sam Roi Hoksip Ha Wan Kap Khrueangbin Kradat".
2017	2	River	"Koi Suru Fortune Cookie – Khukki Siangthai"	Also sang "BNK48 (Bangkok48)"
2018	3	River	"Shonichi – Wan Raek"	Also sang "Sakura no Hanabiratachi – Khwamsongcham Lae Kham-amla"
2018	1st Album Main Song	River	"River"	
2018	4	Jabaja	"Kimi wa Melody – Thoe Khue Melodi"	Also sang "Yume e no Route – Muen Sen Tang"
2018	5	Jabaja	"BNK Festival"	
2019	6	Jabaja	"Beginner"	Senbatsu position from the results of "BNK48 6th Single Senbatsu General Election"
2019	2nd Album Main Song	Jabaja	"Jabaja"	Also sang "Kami7 Go Green – Bye Bye Nai Plastic"
2020	8	Warota People	"High Tension"	Center position of the song, and is also the center of "Dode Di Dong" (Ost. Thibaan x BNK48), which is the group's original song.
2020	9	Warota People	"Heavy Rotation"	Senbatsu position from the results of "BNK48 9th Single Senbatsu General Election"
2021	3rd Album Coupling Song	Warota People	"Can You...?"	
2021	10	-	"D.Aaa"	Also a senbatsu member of "Sukida Sukida Sukida" (1st coupling song)
2022	11	-	"Sayonara Crawl"	
2022	12	-	"Believers"	
2022	BNK48 1st Generation Special Single	-	"Jiwaru DAYS"	Also sang "Pioneer" and "Sakura no Ki ni Narou – Dang Sakura Talod Pai"

Aside from the singles listed above, she is also one of the performing members of River, a song in the group's first album released in 2018. Furthermore, in the second album, Jabaja, she takes her part in two songs, Jabaja and Kami7 Go Green. Also, in 2020, she has participated in the song "Touch by Heart" in three different versions: Special Version (all BNK48 and CGM48 members), English Version, and Isaan Version. There is another song named "Can You...?" which is a collaboration between BNK48 and Grab, and she took a part in this song as well.

In June 2022, BNK48 also announced that Namneung, Pupe, Wee, Gygee, and Mobile will take part in the song "Mhok-Kob" (หมกกบ), which is an original soundtrack of the movie "Pha-Phee-Bok" (ผ้าผีบอก). The song and its music video was released on June 4, 2022.

==== Charaline and QUINNIES ====
A special project named "BNK48 Charaline Verb of Feeling" was announced in late November 2021. The project features 5 rearranged songs performed by each member of Charaline unit (Namneung, Noey, Kaew, Orn, and Tarwaan). Namneung's song is High Tension, which was rearranged in reggae style. It was released altogether with its promotional video (PV) on December 13, 2021. These songs were also performed by Charaline members in "BNK48 Charaline 1st Fanmeet" on February 12–13, 2022.

One of the first subunits of BNK48 and CGM48 members under the newly established "Independent Records (iR)" is "QUINNIES". It is an extended project from Charaline unit, hence five members from that unit belong to the group. During iR press conference on September 27, 2022, they also revealed that they were working on their first single which was expected to be released in early 2023.

=== Filmography ===
Year	Title	Role	Director(s)	Notes	Ref(s)
2018	BNK48: Girls Don't Cry	Herself	Nawapol Thamrongrattanarit (นวพล ธำรงรัตนฤทธิ์)	Documentary film	
2019	Where We Belong	Pahn	Kongdej Jaturanrasmee (คงเดช จาตุรันต์รัศมี)	Full-length film; In theaters June 20, 2019	
2019	Me Before We	Pahn	Kongdej Jaturanrasmee (คงเดช จาตุรันต์รัศมี)	Short film; an extension of Where We Belong	
2019	Stratosphere	Pahn	Kongdej Jaturanrasmee (คงเดช จาตุรันต์รัศมี)	Documentary; an extension of Where We Belong	
2020	Thibaan The Series X BNK48	Herself	Surasak Pongsorn (สุรศักดิ์ ป้องศร), Thiti Srinuan (ธิติ ศรีนวล)	Full-length film; In theaters January 23, 2020	
2020	BNK48: One Take	Herself	Manatanan Panlertwongsakul (มนัสนันท์ พันเลิศวงศ์สกุล)	Documentary film	
2022	Pha-Phee-Bok (The Fabric / ผ้าผีบอก)	Sarapee	Nattapong Arunnate (ณัฐพงษ์ อรุณเนตร์)	Full-length film; In theaters June 23, 2022	
2022	The Cheese Sisters	Fhon	Chookiat Sakveerakul (ชูเกียรติ ศักดิ์วีระกุล), Nattapong Arunnate (ณัฐพงษ์ อรุณเนตร์), Chantana Tiprachart (ฉันทนา ทิพย์ประชาติ), Sorawit Meungkeaw (สรวิชญ์ เมืองแก้ว), Assada Likhitboonma (อัศฎา ลิขิตบุญมา)	Full-length film; In theaters November 24, 2022 Developed from The Girlfriend Planner project?	

=== Television shows ===
Year	Title	Network	Participating member(s)	Notes	Ref(s)
2017	BNK48 Senpai	3 SD	All (1st generation)	Documentary	
2017	BNK48 Show	3 SD	All (1st generation)	Variety show	
2018	Victory BNK48	Workpoint TV	All	Variety show	
2019	ii ne Japan	MCOT HD	Noey, Namneung, Miori, Phukkhom, Aom, Cake	Travel show	
2021	คู่มันส์ Fun Day (Koo-Mun-Fun-Day)	True Inside HD	Namneung, Noey		
2021	ศึก 12 ราศี (Suek 12 Rasri)	3 HD	Namneung, Kaimook	Variety show	
2022	ศึก 12 ราศี (Suek 12 Rasri)	3 HD	Namneung	Variety show	
2022	ก็มาดิคร้าบ (Kor-Ma-Di-Krab)	Workpoint TV	Namneung	Comedy show	
2022	หกฉากครับจารย์ (Hok-Chark-Krub-Jarn)	Workpoint TV	Namneung	Comedy show; 4 episodes	
2022	Shopee 7.7 The Millionaire Game Show	7 HD	Namneung, Noey	also broadcast on Shopee application	
2022	คู่มันส์ Fun Day (Koo-Mun-Fun-Day)	True Inside HD	Namneung, Noey		

== Artist/Actress ==
She is currently affiliated with INC Entertainment after graduating from BNK48 in 2022.

=== Discography ===
Year	Title	Notes	Ref(s)
2023	"แฟนเทสดี (Fan-Taste-Dee)"	With Jane, Pupe, and Kaimook; as Amwel+ Girls	
2024	"Under the Sun"	Original soundtrack for the novel Between Sun and Moon ดั่งตะวันเคียงจันทร์ by ก่อนกรกฎ	
2025	"สายตาของผมจะมองแค่คุณคนเดียว (Sai-Taa-Khong-Pom-Ja-Mong-Khae-Khun-Khon-Deaw)"	With Kaew, Pupe, Mobye (SERTIST)	
2026	"คือเธอ (It's you)"	Original soundtrack for 4 Elements: The Fire series	
2026	"กลับมาพบกัน (Back Again)	With Noey; Original soundtrack for 4 Elements: The Fire series	

=== Fan Meeting & Concert ===
Year	Day/Month	Event name	Venue	City/Country	Notes	Ref.
2023	17 June	ZONO Fantasy Magical Fan Meeting	KBank Siam Pic-Ganesha Theatre	Bangkok, Thailand	From ZONO Fantasy Project	
2023	29 October	Depart’Cher Cherprang BNK48's Graduation Concert (Guest)	Thunder Dome, Muang Thong Thani	Bangkok, Thailand	Guest, performed the song RIVER and the last part of the concert	
2023	11 November	SHINING NAMNEUNG MILIN Birthday & Showcase	Thammasat University Hall, Tha Prachan	Bangkok, Thailand	27th birthday	
2024	10 November	Milin28 Party Camp “A Special Trip with You”	THE BAZAAR THEATER, THE BAZAAR HOTEL BANGKOK	Bangkok, Thailand	28th birthday	
2024	25 December	Satchan BNK48's Graduation Ceremony (Guest)	Major Cineplex Ratchayothin	Bangkok, Thailand	Guest, performed the song #Sukinanda	
2025	28 July	GLOW UP GLAM UP CONCERT	Thunder Dome, Muang Thong Thani	Bangkok, Thailand	With Noey, Kaew, Tarwaan, Jane, Jennis, Pupe, Mobye	
2025	10 October	Curel x NamneungNoey Exclusive Fan meet	Not publicly announced	Bangkok, Thailand	With Noey	
2026	11 January	4 Elements: The Grand Unveiling	Union Hall, Union Mall	Bangkok, Thailand	With Noey, Apple, Mim, Freen, Engfa, Charlotte	
2026	12 September	4 Elements Infinite Bonds Fan Meeting	Union Hall, Union Mall	Bangkok, Thailand	With Noey, Apple, Mim, Freen, Becky, Engfa, Charlotte	
2026	15 November	Namneung Fan Meeting THE FEELING OF US: Written With You, Chapter 30	NT AUDITORIUM, NT PCL Headquarter Chaengwattana	Bangkok, Thailand		

=== Filmography ===
==== Series ====
Year	Title	Channel/Platform	Role	Note	Ref(s)
2025	Somewhere Somehow รักปากแข็ง	Workpoint	Tar	Guest role	
2026	4Elements บ้านวาทินวณิช: The Earth (วิวาห์ปฐพี)	Ch7HD	Fai (Atchima Wathinwanit)	Supporting role	
2026	4 Elements บ้านวาทินวณิช: The Water (นทีร้อยเล่ห์)	Ch7HD	Fai (Atchima Wathinwanit)	Supporting role	
2026	4 Elements บ้านวาทินวณิช: The Air (เสน่หาวาโย)	Ch7HD	Fai (Atchima Wathinwanit)	Supporting role	
2026	4 Elements บ้านวาทินวณิช: The Fire (โซ่รักอัคนี)	Ch7HD	Fai (Atchima Wathinwanit)	Leading role; co-starred with Noey	

==== Music Videos ====
Year	Title	Artist	Note	Ref(s)
2023	ซ้อมรอ (Sorm-Roh)	HAVE A NICE DAY	With Jane, Pupe, and Kaimook	
2023	แฟนเทสดี (Fan-Taste-Dee)	Amwel+ Girls	With Jane, Pupe, and Kaimook; as Amwel+ Girls	
2023	Under The Sun	Namneung Milin D. (Self)	Original soundtrack for the novel between Sun and Moon ดั่งตะวันเคียงจันทร์ by ก่อนกรกฎ	
2024	with us, without	PUPÉ Jiradapa	Original soundtrack for the novel Draw without Eraser วาดชีวา by ก่อนกรกฎ Co-starred with Aom; two versions were released (Official MV and Drama Version)	
2026	"คือเธอ (It's you)"	Namneung Milin (Self)	Original soundtrack for 4 Elements: The Fire series	
2026	"กลับมาพบกัน (Back Again)	Namneung Milin (Self) & Noey Kanteera	Original soundtrack for 4 Elements: The Fire series	

==== Television shows ====
Year	Day/Month	Title	Channel	Notes	Ref(s)
2023	11 February	ฮัลโหลซุปตาร์ ปั๊ว ปัง อลังเวอร์	7 HD	With Jane, Jaa, Pupe, and Kaimook	
2023	16 April	ดาราล้อกันเล่น อะไรครับเนี่ย	GMM25	With Pupe	
2023	21 April	One Day With Matthew หนึ่งวันมันดี ตีซี้คนดัง	Mono 29		
2023	9 December	Miyagi Recipe วงล้อลุ้นอร่อย	Amarin TV	With Noey, Pupe, and Kaimook	
2024	16 March	The Big Kitchen	Workpoint TV		
2025	14 June	บริษัทฮาไม่จำกัดจัดเต็ม	Thairath TV		
2025	17 June	FACE OFF แฝดคนละฝา	Workpoint TV	With Cherprang	
2025	3 July	T-POP STAGE	Workpoint TV	As a special MC	
2025	22 September	GOODBYE ตายไม่รู้ตัว	Workpoint TV	With Kaew	

==== Online Shows ====
Year	Day/Month	Show Title	Channel/Platform	Notes	Ref(s)
2023	24 February	GrabFood อินลดมากกว่าอินเลิฟ	Grab Thailand - YouTube	With Noey	
2023	7 March	หมีLIVEปะ?	โคตรคูล LIVE - YouTube & Facebook	With Jane, Jaa, and Pupe	
2023	8 March	จานซ่อนแอบ	zommarie - YouTube	With SERTIST (Kaew, Mobye, Pupe)	
2023	3 August	GrabFood Self Pick-Up 1 Day Date	Grab Thailand	With Jennis	
2023	16 September	คำต้องเชื่อม	ยกกำลัง (Yokgamlang) - YouTube	With SERTIST	
2024	1 April	OKWEGO	OKWEGO CHANNEL - YouTube	With SERTIST	
2024	2 April	หมีLIVEปะ?	โคตรคูล LIVE - YouTube & Facebook	With Jane, Kaimook, and Pupe	
2024	14 April	CAMPปลิ้น	โคตรคูล (Khotkool) - YouTube	With Jane, Pupe, and Kaimook	
2024	21 April	โต๊ะหมู่ชาบู	อารีย์สัมพันธ์ (arisamphan) - YouTube	With Pupe, Mobye, Kaew, Jane, Jennis, and Noey	
2024	12 December	Thailand Music Countdown LIVE	Thailand Music Countdown - YouTube		
2025	26 March	LINE MAN LIVE	LINE MAN Thailand - YouTube & Facebook	With Noey	
2025	23 May	ShopeeFood LIVE	ShopeeFood TH - YouTube	With Noey	
2025	9 June	LINE MAN LIVE	LINE MAN Thailand - YouTube & Facebook	With Noey	
2025	20 August	LINE MAN LIVE	LINE MAN Thailand - YouTube & Facebook	With Noey	
2025	29 September	LINE MAN LIVE	LINE MAN Thailand - YouTube & Facebook	With Noey	

=== Others ===
Year	Title	Notes	Ref(s)
2023	Zono Fantasy	Presenter for a web-based dice game; with Pupe, Jane, and Jaa	
2024	Yggdra Chronicle by Bonfire Gathering	Presenter for a mobile turn-based RPG game; with Pupe, Jane, and Kaimook	

== Gallery ==
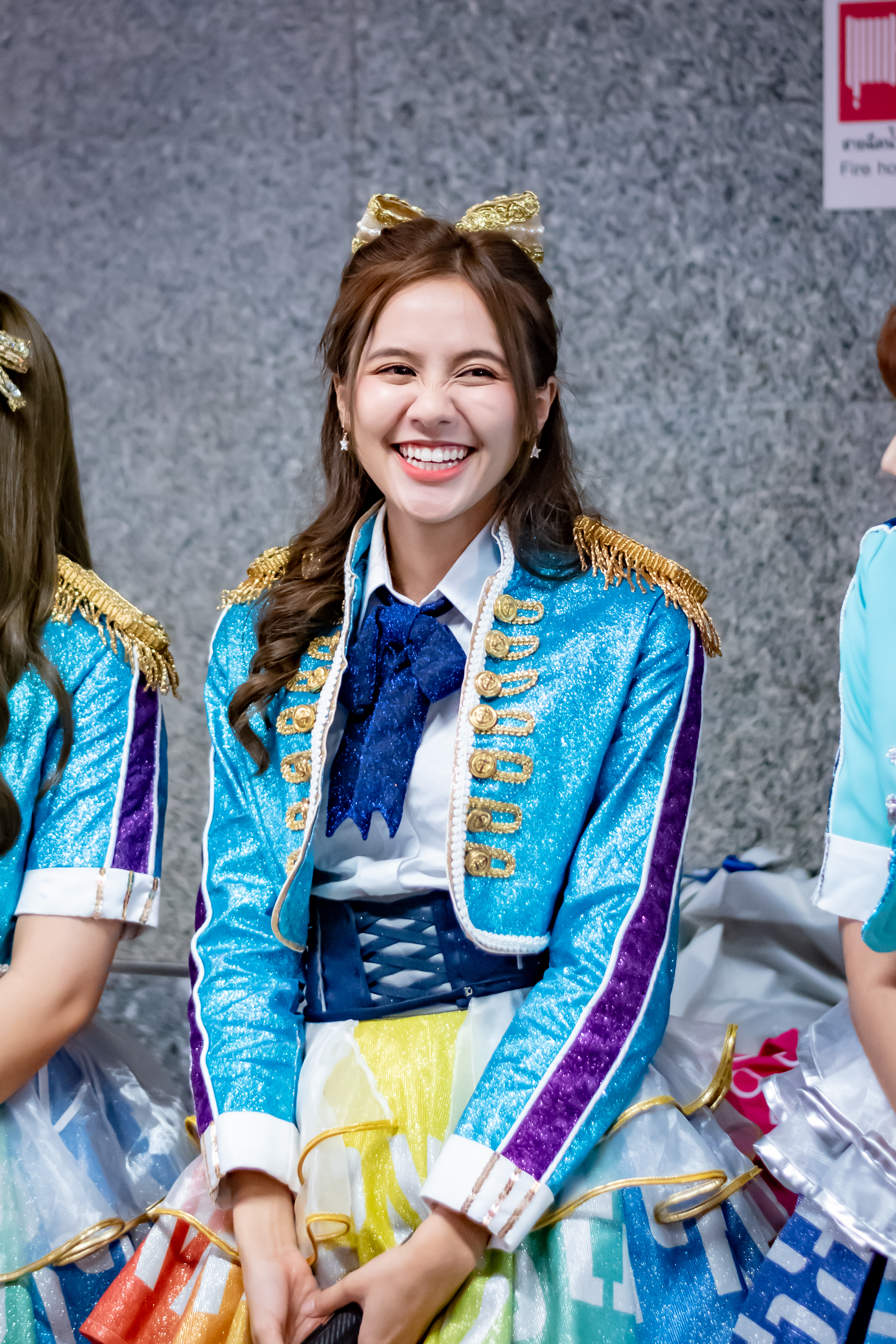
Namneung before her performance at Metro Mall Chatuchak grand opening event.

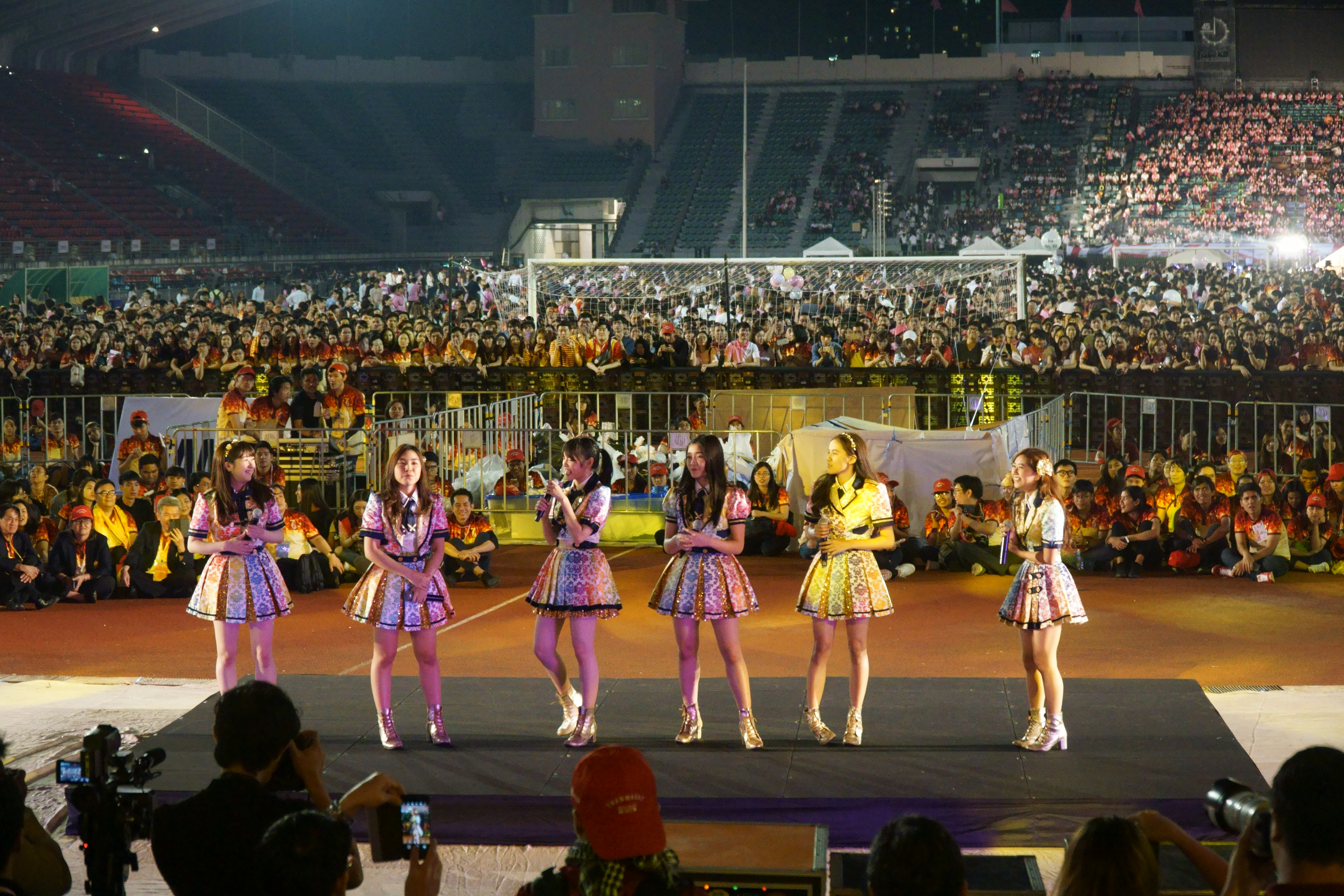
Izurina, Tarwaan, Cherprang, Jennis, Namneung, and Miori at the 72nd Chula–Thammasat Traditional Football Match on 3 February 2018.

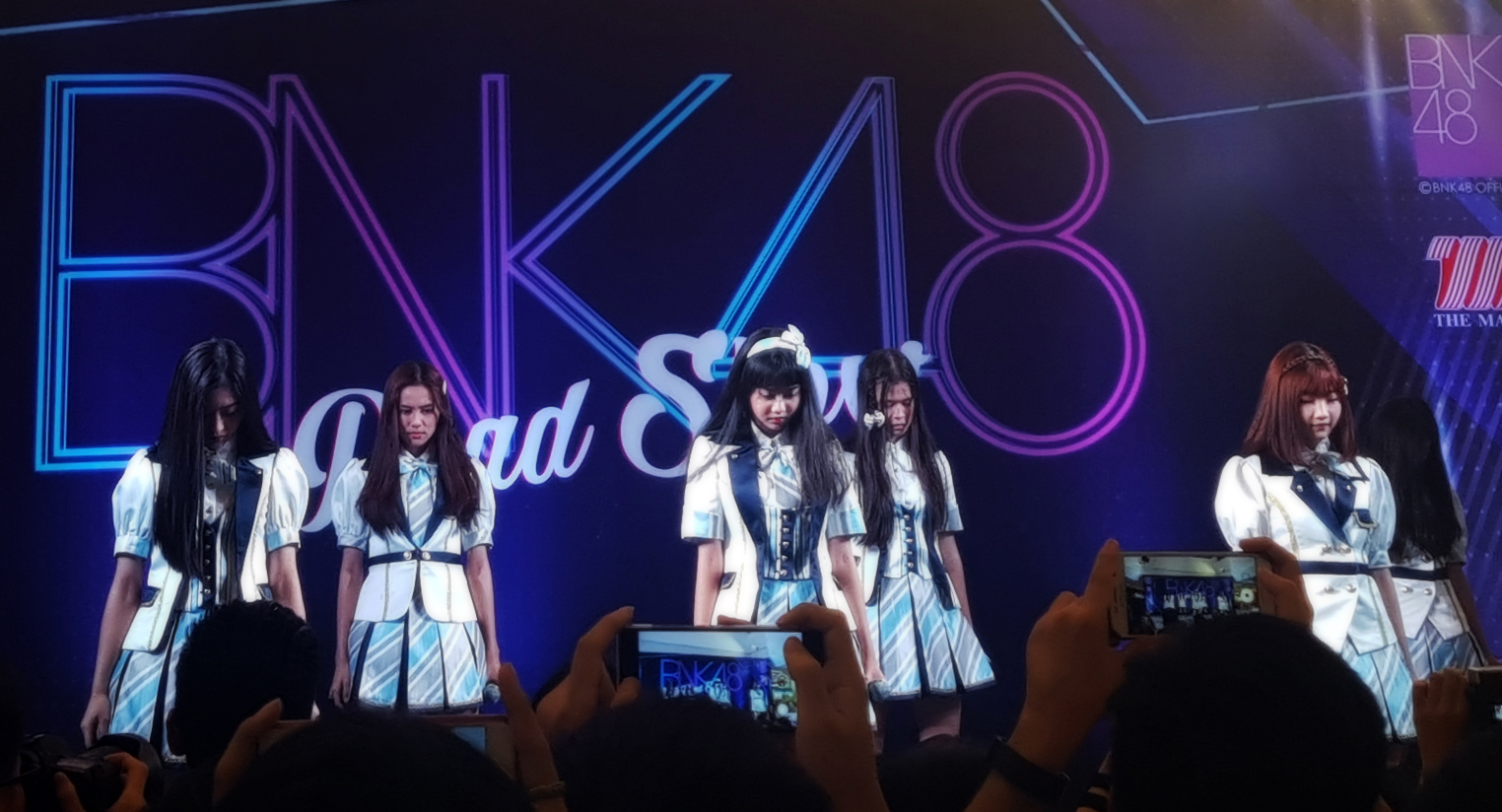
Jennis, Kaimook, Maysa, Namhom, and Namneung at a roadshow event held at The Mall Bang Kapi auditorium, Bang Kapi District, Bangkok, Thailand, on Sunday, 23 July 2017.

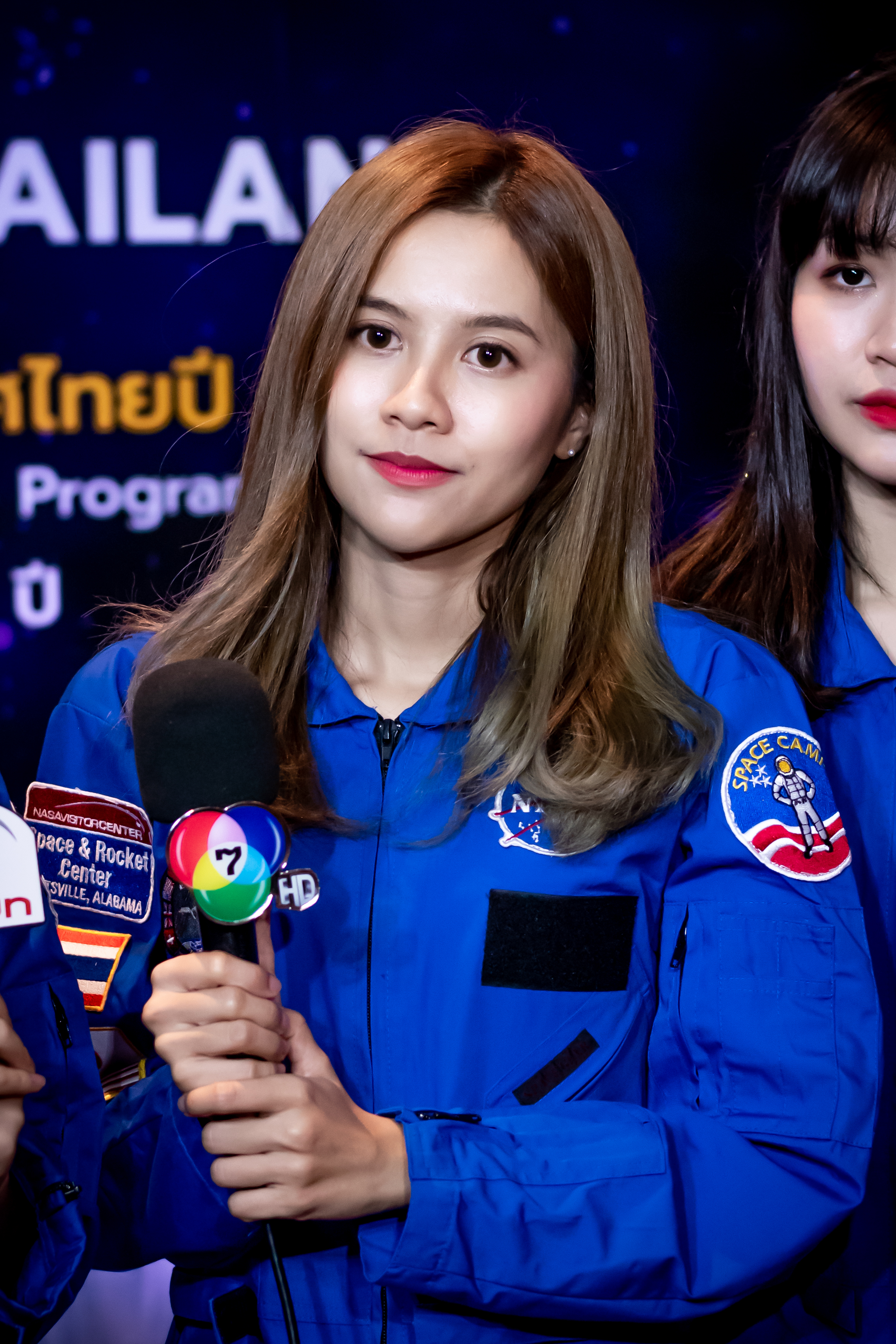
Milin Dokthian (Namneung) after Space Camp Thailand press conference event, August 2019.

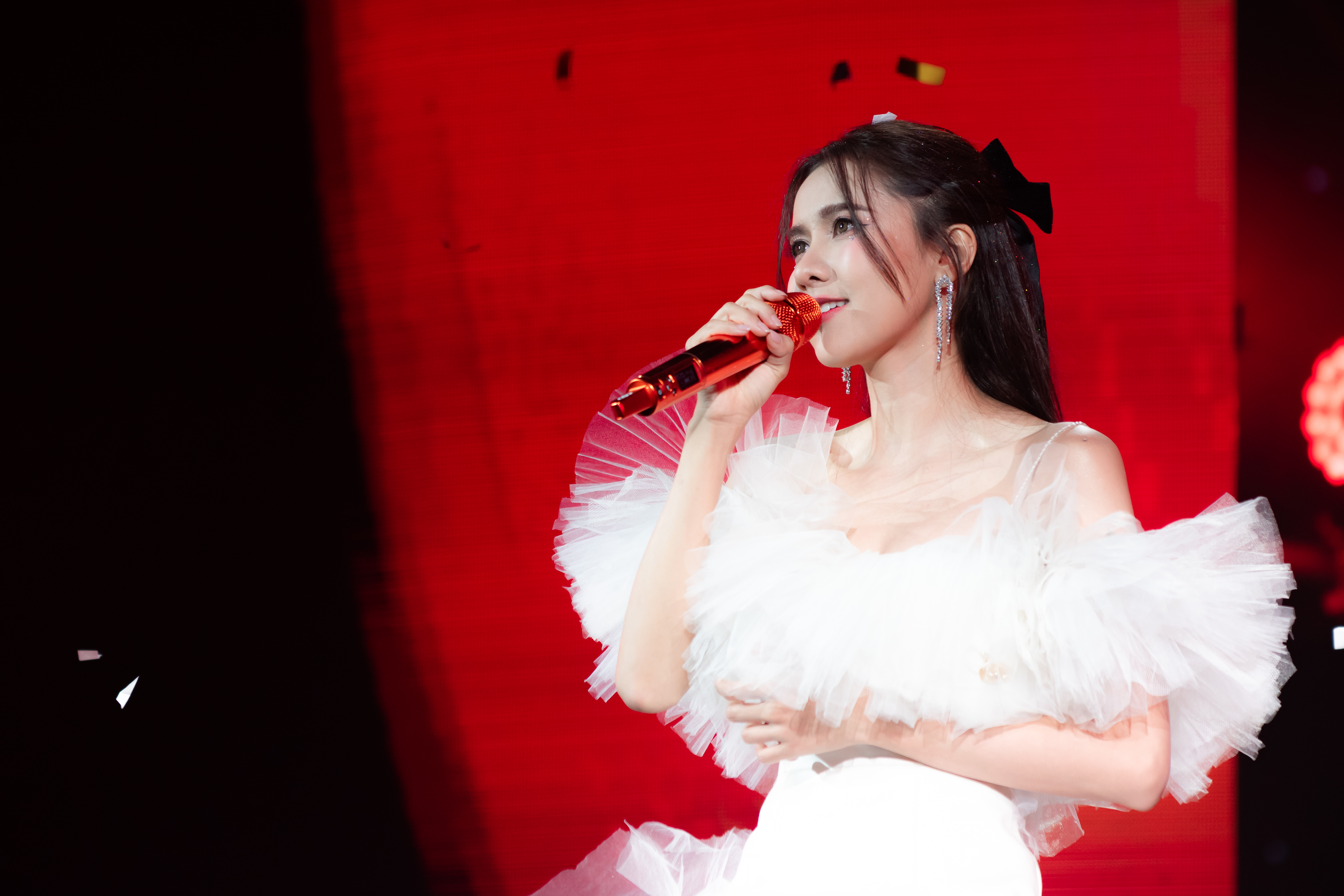
Namneung at "Shining Namneung Milin Birthday & Showcase" event on November 11, 2023.

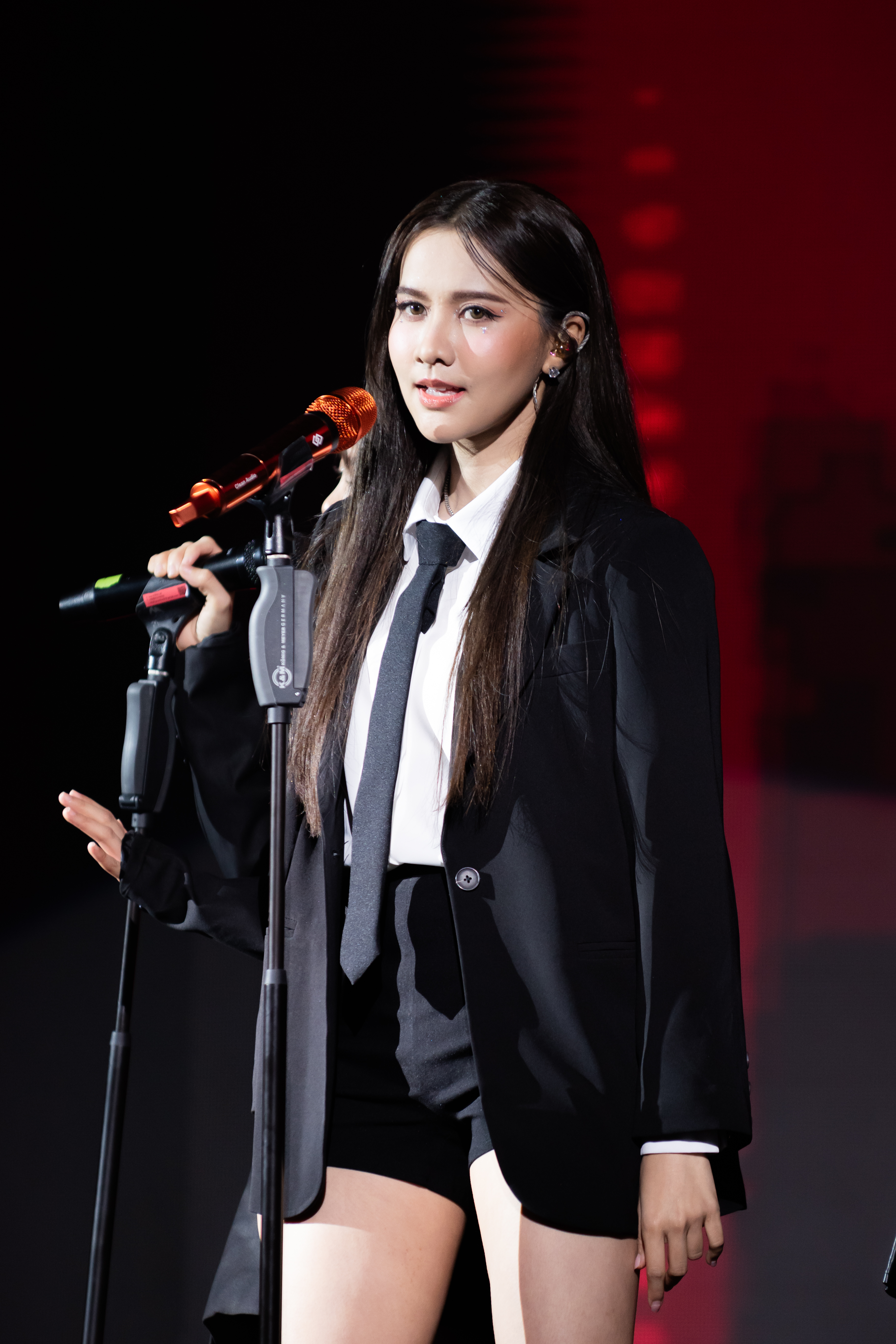
Namneung at "Shining Namneung Milin Birthday & Showcase" event on November 11, 2023.
