= List of BNK48 members =

BNK48 is a Thai idol group and the third international sister group of the Japanese idol group AKB48, based in Bangkok, Thailand.

The original members of the group were recruited in mid-2016 and announced in early 2017, comprising a total of 30 people. For the second generation, 27 additional members were announced on 29 April 2018. On 9 August 2020, 19 third-generation members were announced, and on 30 October 2022, 11 fourth-generation members were revealed. Some members have left the group in a process known as graduation. As of November 2026, the group consists of 38 members, of whom 16 constitute Team BIII, 16 constitute Team NV, and the rest categorised as trainees.

The first captain of the group is Cherprang, who also serves as first general manager (shihainin). Popper is current general manager, Hoop is the current captain of BNK48, Marine is the current captain of Team BIII, Emmy is the current captain of Team NV.

== Team BIII ==
The first formation of Team BIII (read B Three) was announced on 24 December 2017, originally consisting of 24 members, with Pun as captain and Jennis as vice captain. There was also a team shuffle announcement on 16 November 2019, through which some members were moved to Team NV and some trainees were promoted to Team BIII. After Pun, Jennis, Miori and Earn left the group, Marine is serving as the team captain and no any member is serving as the team vice captain.

After graduation of some members and team shuffling, the team now consists of 11 members as follows:

Stage name	Birth name	Birth date (age)	Gen.	Election rank			Remarks	Ref
Stage name	Birth name	Birth date (age)	Gen.	4	5	6	Remarks	Ref
Fame (Thai: เฟม)	Nunthapak Kittirattanaviwat (Thai: นันทภัค กิตติรัตนวิวัฒน์)	15 October 2004 (age 22)	3rd	24		6		
Hoop (Thai: ฮูพ)	Patalee Prasertteerachai (Thai: ปาฏลี ประเสริฐธีระชัย)	18 September 2002 (age 24)	3rd	14	4	5	BNK48 Captain	
Janry (Thai: แจนรี่)	Kalnyarat Panphiphat (Thai: กัลยารัตน์ ปั้นพิพัฒน์)	3 January 2008 (age 18)	4th	37	18	18		
Luksorn (Thai: ลูกศร)	Thasluck Kaewbourabat (Thai: ทัศน์ลักษณ์ แก้วบัวรบัติ)	27 June 2005 (age 21)	6th			20		
Mail (Thai: เมล)	Sidaporn Lintaworndee (Thai: สิดาพร หลินถาวรดี)	17 July 2010 (age 16)	6th			42		
Marine (Thai: มารีน)	Kotchapon Ponchokchai (Thai: กชพร พรโชคชัย)	29 April 2006 (age 20)	4th	35	27	10	Team BIII Captain	
Micha (Thai: มิชา)	Naththarinee Kusolphat (Thai: ณัฐรินีย์ กุศลพัฒน์)	12 June 2007 (age 19)	4th	51	23	8		
Monet (Thai: โมเน่ต์)	Parita Rirermkul (Thai: ภาริตา ริเริ่มกุล)	4 August 2008 (age 18)	3rd	13		3		
Patt (Thai: แพท)	Pattra Theeravas (Thai: ภัทรา ธีระวาส)	17 June 2008 (age 18)	4th	55	29	29		
Praew (Thai: แพรว)	Praewa Siriwattanasakdikul (Thai: แพรวา ศิริวัฒนศักดิกุล)	23 May 2008 (age 18)	6th			22		
Wawa (Thai: วาว่า)	Phimnalrat Lumyai (Thai: พิมพ์นเรศ ลำใย)	11 August 2009 (age 17)	4th	61	21	28		

== Team NV ==
Team NV (read N five) formation was announced during Pun's birthday stage on 16 November 2019. Initially, Tarwaan was the team captain while Pupe was vice captain. After Tarwaan, Pupe, Nine, Popper and Kaofrang left the group, Emmy is serving as the team captain and no any member is serving as the team vice captain.

The team now consists of 11 members as follows:

Stage name	Birth name	Birth date (age)	Gen.	Election rank			Remarks	Ref
Stage name	Birth name	Birth date (age)	Gen.	4	5	6	Remarks	Ref
Arlee (Thai: อาหลี)	Chanakarn Osatanuphap (Thai: ชนากานต์ โอสถานุภาพ)	26 March 2004 (age 22)	5th		19	15		
Berry (Thai: เบอร์รี่)	Jirapinya Chantawannakul (Thai: จิรภิญญา จันทวรรณกูร)	23 July 2005 (age 21)	4th	60	44	44		
Emmy (Thai: เอ็มมี่)	Ornnitcha Phromsupa (Thai: อรณิชชา พรหมสุภา)	13 September 2007 (age 19)	4th	44	20	19	Team NV Captain	
Jew (Thai: จิว)	Nuttayar Bavollatanasil (Thai: ณัฐญาฐ์ บวรรัตนศิลป์)	28 November 2003 (age 22)	5th		10	11		
L (Thai: แอล)	Sirikorn Nilkasap (Thai: สิริกร นิลกษาปน์)	13 February 2003 (age 23)	4th	19	9	13		
Palmmy (Thai: ปาล์มมี่)	Punyisa Kaewsawang (Thai: ปุญญิสา แก้วสว่าง)	28 October 2003 (age 23)	4th	48	31	31		
Pancake (Thai: แพนเค้ก)	Pitthayaporn Kiatthitinan (Thai: พิทยาภรณ์ เกียรติฐิตินันท์)	6 February 2007 (age 19)	3rd	5	1	1		
Proud (Thai: ภราว)	Pharawee Chirathadasakun (Thai: ภารวี จิรธาดาสกุล)	14 November 2002 (age 24)	5th		32	49		
Saonoi (Thai: สาวน้อย)	Pichsinee Itthiratanakomol (Thai: พิชญ์สินี อิทธิรัตนะโกมล)	9 November 2005 (age 21)	5th		22	26		
Sindy (Thai: ซินดี้)	Kitchaya Udomboondee (Thai: กฤตชญา อุดมบุญดี)	3 April 2009 (age 17)	4th	58	33	33		
Yoghurt (Thai: โยเกิร์ต)	Nopparada Leartviriyaporn (Thai: นพรดา เลิศวิริยะพร)	10 November 2004 (age 22)	3rd	22	8	12		

== Trainees ==
The members that are not promoted to any team are categorised as trainees (Japanese: 研究生 kenkyūsei). There are now 15 trainees as follows:

Stage name	Birth name	Birth date (age)	Gen.	Election rank			Remarks	Ref
Stage name	Birth name	Birth date (age)	Gen.	4	5	6	Remarks	Ref
Blythe (Thai: บลายธ์)	Natransa Sirilapviboon (Thai: ณัฏฐ์รัญศา ศิริลาภวิบูรณ์)	22 July 2010 (age 16)	6th			24		
Cartoon (Thai: การ์ตูน)	Natthathida Na Amphai (Thai: ณัฎฐธิดา ณ อัมภัย)	26 August 2009 (age 17)	6th			41		
Galeya (Thai: เกลญ่า)	Napapak Chokkunanuntakul (Thai: นภภัค โชคคุณานันทกุล)	24 December 2008 (age 17)	5th		34	16		
Grape (Thai: เกรพ)	Amika Yodsaeng (Thai: เอมิกา ยอดแสง)	8 April 2011 (age 15)	6th			36	Youngest member of the group	
Inkcha (Thai: อิ้งค์ชา)	Chalita Kittikoon (Thai: ชลิตา กิตติคุณ)	31 July 2007 (age 19)	6th			52		
Khaimook (Thai: ไข่มุก)	Nanthnapas Somwat (Thai: นันท์นภัส สมวัฒน์)	5 January 2004 (age 22)	5th		36	46		
Khowjow (Thai: ข้าวจ้าว)	Chanyanuch Pokrud (Thai: ชัญญานุช โผกรุด)	23 February 2007 (age 19)	6th			30		
Mayji (Thai: เมย์จิ)	Supitsara Jirivipakorn (Thai: ศุภิสรา จิริวิภากร)	5 May 2005 (age 21)	5th		48	50		
Mint (Thai: มิ้นท์)	Natthamol Warapitayut (Thai: ณัฐมณ วรพิทยุต)	4 February 2010 (age 16)	6th			39		
Mirin (Thai: มิริน)	Rinlisa Burapakon (Thai: รินณ์ลิสา บูรภากรณ์)	28 May 2010 (age 16)	6th			48		
Nall (Thai: แนล)	Nalliya Wipakkit (Thai: แนลริยา วิภาคกิจ)	25 August 2001 (age 25)	5th		28	4	Oldest member of the group	
Nammonn (Thai: น้ำมนต์)	Nattamon Songtis (Thai: ณัฐมนต์ สองทิศ)	10 August 2003 (age 23)	5th		25	27		
Neen (Thai: นีน)	Neira Bunnag (Thai: นีร บุนนาค)	14 April 2002 (age 24)	5th		12	7		
Niya (Thai: นีญ่า)	Suvibha Laithomya (Thai: สุวิภาส์ ลายถมยา)	14 February 2009 (age 17)	5th		24	21		
Rose (Thai: โรส)	Panisara Buranapha (Thai: ปาณิสรา บูรณาภา)	1 November 2007 (age 19)	6th			2		

== Former members ==
Like its sister group, the leaving of the group is known as graduation. The graduated members are as follows:

Stage name	Birth name	Birth date (age)	Gen.	Graduation date	Last Status	Ref			
Kitkat (Thai: คิตแคต)	Watsamon Phongwanit (Thai: วรรษมณฑ์ พงษ์วานิช)	1 November 2001 (age 25)	Gen.	Graduation date	Last Status	Ref	1st	23 September 2017	Trainee
Cincin (Thai: ซินซิน)	Irada Tavachphongsri ( Thai: ไอรดา ธวัชผ่องศรี)	7 November 2000 (age 26)	1st	18 November 2017	Trainee				
Jan (Thai: แจน)	Jetsupa Kruetang (Thai: เจตสุภา เครือแตง)	8 April 1994 (age 32)	1st	28 February 2018	Team BIII				
Namhom (Thai: น้ำหอม)	Christin Larsen (Thai: คริสติน ลาร์เซ่น)	17 June 2002 (age 24)	1st	12 February 2018	Trainee				
Can (Thai: แคน)	Nayika Srinian (Thai: นายิกา ศรีเนียน)	10 November 1997 (age 29)	1st	26 August 2018	Team BIII				
Maysa (Thai: เมษา)	Mesa Chinavicharana (Thai: เมษา จีนะวิจารณะ)	8 April 1999 (age 27)	1st	21 October 2018	Trainee				
Deenee (Thai: ดีนี่)	Pimnipa Tungsakul (Thai: พิมพ์นิภา ตั้งสกุล)	28 November 2001 (age 24)	2nd	11 August 2019	Trainee				
Aom (Thai: ออม)	Punyawee Jungcharoen (Thai: ปุณยวีร์ จึงเจริญ)	20 September 1995 (age 31)	2nd	27 August 2019 (moved to CGM48)	Trainee				
Izurina (Japanese: いずりな)	Rina Izuta (Japanese: 伊豆田 莉奈)	26 November 1995 (age 30)	10th (AKB48)	27 August 2019 (moved to CGM48)	Team BIII				
Cake (Thai: เค้ก)	Nawaporn Chansuk (Thai: นวพร จันทร์สุข)	18 November 1996 (age 29)	2nd	27 September 2019	Trainee				
Maira (Thai: มัยร่า)	Maira Kuyama (Thai: มะอิระ คูยามา)	24 February 1997 (age 29)	2nd	7 December 2019	Trainee				
Natherine (Thai: แนทเธอรีน)	Dusita Kitisarakulchai (Thai: ดุสิตา กิติสาระกุลชัย)	11 November 1999 (age 27)	2nd	16 February 2020 (resigned)	Team NV				
Oom (Thai: อุ้ม)	Natcha Krisdhasima (Thai: ณัชชา กฤษฎาสิมะ)	29 September 2002 (age 24)	2nd	16 February 2020 (resigned)	Trainee				
Nink (Thai: นิ้ง)	Mananya Kaoju (Thai: มนัญญา เกาะจู)	3 February 2000 (age 26)	1st	25 March 2020 (resigned)	Team NV				
Juné (Thai: จูเน่)	Plearnpichaya Komalarajun (Thai: เพลินพิชญา โกมลารชุน)	4 July 2000 (age 26)	2nd	11 June 2020 (resigned)	Team BIII				
Kheng (Thai: เข่ง)	Juthamas Khonta (Thai: จุฑามาศ คลทา)	26 March 2000 (age 26)	2nd	4 December 2020	Team BIII				
Fifa (Thai: ฟีฟ่า)	Paweethida Sakunpiphat (Thai: ปวีณ์ธิดา สกุลพิพัฒน์)	6 November 2001 (age 25)	2nd	23 December 2020	Trainee				
Faii (Thai: ฝ้าย)	Sumitta Duangkaew (Thai: สุมิตตา ดวงแก้ว)	28 June 1996 (age 30)	2nd	19 March 2021 (dismissed)	Team BIII				
Jeje (Thai: จีจี้)	Natkritta Sangdamhru (Thai: ณัฐกฤตา สังดำหรุ)	11 September 2005 (age 21)	3rd	19 March 2021 (dismissed)	Trainee				
Mewnich (Thai: มิวนิค)	Nannaphas Loetnamchoetsakun (Thai: นันท์นภัส เลิศนามเชิดสกุล)	11 March 2002 (age 24)	2nd	5 December 2021	Team NV				
Bamboo (Thai: แบมบู)	Janista Tansiri (Thai: จณิสตา ตันศิริ)	3 September 2002 (age 24)	2nd	29 May 2022	Team NV				
View (Thai: วิว)	Kamonthida Rotthawinithi (Thai: กมนธิดา โรจน์ทวีนิธิ)	28 May 2004 (age 22)	2nd	31 May 2022	Trainee				
Music (Thai: มิวสิค)	Praewa Suthamphong (Thai: แพรวา สุธรรมพงษ์)	24 February 2001 (age 25)	1st	21 December 2022	Team NV				
Mobile (Thai: โมบายล์)	Pimrapat Phadungwatanachok (Thai: พิมรภัส ผดุงวัฒนะโชค)	9 July 2002 (age 24)	1st	21 December 2022	Team NV				
Kaimook (Thai: ไข่มุก)	Warattaya Deesomlert (Thai: วรัทยา ดีสมเลิศ)	27 August 1997 (age 29)	1st	21 December 2022	Team NV				
Jennis (Thai: เจนนิษฐ์)	Jennis Oprasert (Thai: เจนนิษฐ์ โอ่ประเสริฐ)	4 July 2000 (age 26)	1st	21 December 2022	Team BIII				
Jib (Thai: จิ๊บ)	Suchaya Saenkhot (Thai: สุชญา แสนโคต)	4 July 2002 (age 24)	1st	21 December 2022	Team BIII				
Korn (Thai: ก่อน)	Vathusiri Phuwapunyasiri (Thai: วฑูศิริ ภูวปัญญาสิริ)	21 January 1999 (age 27)	1st	21 December 2022	Team BIII				
Namsai (Thai: น้ำใส)	Pichayapa Natha (Thai: พิชญาภา นาถา)	26 October 1999 (age 27)	1st	21 December 2022	Team NV				
Orn (Thai: อร)	Patchanan Jiajirachote (Thai: พัศชนันท์ เจียจิรโชติ)	3 February 1997 (age 29)	1st	21 December 2022	Team NV				
Jaa (Thai: จ๋า)	Napaphat Worraphuttanon (Thai: ณปภัช วรพฤทธานนท์)	20 January 2003 (age 23)	1st	21 December 2022	Team NV				
Jane (Thai: เจน)	Kunjiranut Intarasin (Thai: กุลจิราณัฐ อินทรศิลป์)	23 March 2000 (age 26)	1st	21 December 2022	Team BIII				
Noey (Thai: เนย)	Kanteera Wadcharathadsanakul (Thai: กานต์ธีรา วัชรทัศนกุล)	9 April 1997 (age 29)	1st	21 December 2022	Team BIII				
Tarwaan (Thai: ตาหวาน)	Isarapa Thawatpakdee (Thai: อิสราภา ธวัชภักดี)	18 December 1996 (age 29)	1st	21 December 2022	Team NV				
Pun (Thai: ปัญ)	Punsikorn Tiyakorn (Thai: ปัญสิกรณ์ ติยะกร)	9 November 2000 (age 26)	1st	21 December 2022	Team BIII				
Piam (Thai: เปี่ยม)	Rinrada Inthaisong (Thai: รินรดา อินทร์ไธสง)	4 June 2003 (age 23)	1st	21 December 2022	Team BIII				
Namneung (Thai: น้ำหนึ่ง)	Milin Watinthanakit (Thai: มิลิญ วาทินธนะกิจ)	11 November 1996 (age 30)	1st	21 December 2022	Team NV				
Pupe (Thai: ปูเป้)	Jiradapa Intajak (Thai: จิรดาภา อินทจักร)	18 January 1998 (age 28)	1st	21 December 2022	Team NV				
Kate (Thai: เคท)	Korapat Nilprapa (Thai: กรภัทร์ นิลประภา)	9 June 2001 (age 25)	1st	21 December 2022	Team BIII				
Mind (Thai: มายด์)	Panisa Srilaloeng (Thai: ปณิศา ศรีละเลิง)	6 September 2001 (age 25)	1st	21 December 2022	Trainee				
Kaew (Thai: แก้ว)	Natruja Chutiwansopon (Thai: ณัฐรุจา ชุติวรรณโสภณ)	31 March 1994 (age 32)	1st	21 December 2022	Team BIII				
Pim (Thai: พิม)	Nicharee Wachiralapphaithoon (Thai: ณิชารีย์ วชิรลาภไพฑูรย์)	26 February 2006 (age 20)	3rd	15 January 2023	Trainee				
Pampam (Thai: แพมแพม)	Sarisa Worasunthorn (Thai: สาริศา วรสุนทร)	3 July 2003 (age 23)	3rd	29 March 2023	Team NV				
Cherprang (Thai: เฌอปราง)	Cherprang Areekul (Thai: เฌอปราง อารีย์กุล)	2 May 1996 (age 30)	1st	30 October 2023	Team BIII				
Miori (Japanese: 美織)	Miori Ohkubo (Japanese: 大久保美織)	30 September 1998 (age 28)	1st	31 December 2023	Team BIII				
Fond (Thai: ฟ้อนด์)	Natticha Chantaravareelekha (Thai: ณัฐทิชา จันทรวารีเลขา)	3 December 2002 (age 23)	2nd	30 April 2024	Team NV				
Gygee (Thai: จีจี้)	Nuttakul Pimtongchaikul (Thai: ณัฐกุล พิมพ์ธงชัยกุล)	4 October 2001 (age 25)	2nd	30 April 2024	Team NV				
Khamin (Thai: ขมิ้น)	Manipa Roopanya (Thai: มณิภา รู้ปัญญา)	23 April 1999 (age 27)	2nd	30 April 2024	Team NV				
Minmin (Thai: มินมิน)	Rachaya Tupkunanon (Thai: รชยา ทัพพ์คุณานนต์)	20 March 1997 (age 29)	2nd	30 April 2024	Team BIII				
Myyu (Thai: มายยู)	Khawisara Singplod (Thai: กวิสรา สิงห์ปลอด)	28 October 1999 (age 27)	2nd	30 April 2024	Team BIII				
New (Thai: นิว)	Chanyapuk Numprasop (Thai: ชัญญาภัค นุ่มประสพ)	2 January 2003 (age 23)	2nd	30 April 2024	Team NV				
Niky (Thai: นิกี้)	Warinrat Yolprasong (Thai: วรินท์รัตน์ ยลประสงค์)	26 January 2005 (age 21)	2nd	30 April 2024	Team BIII				
Nine (Thai: นาย)	Phattharanarin Mueanrit (Thai: ภัทรนรินทร์ เหมือนฤทธิ์)	11 November 2000 (age 26)	2nd	30 April 2024	Team NV				
Pakwan (Thai: พาขวัญ)	Pakwan Noijaiboon (Thai: พาขวัญ น้อยใจบุญ)	18 February 2000 (age 26)	2nd	30 April 2024	Team NV				
Panda (Thai: แพนด้า)	Jidarpha Chamchooy (Thai: จิดาภา แช่มช้อย)	10 October 1997 (age 29)	2nd	30 April 2024	Team BIII				
Phukkhom (Thai: ผักขม)	Sirikarn Shinnawatsuwan (Thai: สิริการย์ ชินวัชร์สุวรรณ)	28 February 1998 (age 28)	2nd	30 April 2024	Team NV				
Ratah (Thai: รตา)	Ratah Chinkrajangkit (Thai: รตา ชินกระจ่างกิจ)	27 March 2002 (age 24)	2nd	30 April 2024	Team NV				
Stang (Thai: สตางค์)	Tarisa Preechatangkit (Thai: ตริษา ปรีชาตั้งกิจ)	22 October 2003 (age 23)	2nd	30 April 2024	Team NV				
Wee (Thai: วี)	Weeraya Zhang (Thai: วีรยา จาง)	23 October 2001 (age 25)	2nd	30 April 2024	Team BIII				
Paeyah (Thai: ปาเอญ่า)	Nippitcha Pipitdaecha (Thai: นิพพิชฌาน์ พิพิธเดชา)	14 May 2005 (age 21)	3rd	30 June 2024	Team NV				
Nana (Thai: นานา)	Nana Goto (Thai: นานา โกโตะ)	25 March 2007 (age 19)	5th	31 August 2024	Trainee				
Jaokhem (Thai: เจ้าเข็ม)	Chanikhan Busadee (Thai: ชนิกานต์ บุษดี)	12 October 2003 (age 23)	3rd	1 November 2024	Team NV				
Nene (Thai: เนเน่)	Thanida Akarawuthi (Thai: ธนิดา อัครวุฒิ)	14 March 2001 (age 25)	4th	8 December 2024	Trainee				
Satchan (Japanese: さっちゃん) (Thai: ซัทจัง)	Sachiya Hanami (Japanese: 花見咲知弥); Sawitchaya Kajonrungsilp (Thai: สวิชญา ขจรรุ่งศิลป์)	13 December 2003 (age 22)	1st	31 December 2024	Team NV				
Popper (Thai: ป๊อปเป้อ)	Pinyada Jungkanjana (Thai: พิณญาดา จึงกาญจนา)	13 September 1998 (age 28)	3rd	7 September 2025	Team NV				
Earn (Thai: เอิร์น)	Wachiraphon Phatthanaphanit (Thai: วชิราพร พัฒนพานิช)	3 December 1998 (age 27)	3rd	6 March 2026	Team BIII				
Earth (Thai: เอิร์ธ)	Napason Siripanee (Thai: นภสรณ์ ศิริปาณี)	22 April 2002 (age 24)	3rd	6 March 2026	Team NV				
Eve (Thai: อีฟ)	Issaree Taweegulpanit (Thai: อิสรีย์ ทวีกุลพาณิชย์)	22 January 2003 (age 23)	3rd	6 March 2026	Team BIII				
Grace (Thai: เกรซ)	Virunpat Thamrongpantavanich (Thai: วิรัลพัชร ธำรงค์พันธวนิช)	2 August 2003 (age 23)	3rd	6 March 2026	Team NV				
Kaofrang (Thai: ข้าวฟ่าง)	Yanisa Muangkam (Thai: ญาณิศา เมืองคำ)	15 November 2002 (age 24)	3rd	6 March 2026	Team NV				
Mean (Thai: มีน)	Nathanya Dulyapol (Thai: ณัฐธันยา ดุลยพล)	8 July 2007 (age 19)	3rd	6 March 2026	Team BIII				
Peak (Thai: พีค)	Phusita Watthanakronkeaw (Thai: ภูษิตา วัฒนากรแก้ว)	2 April 2004 (age 22)	3rd	6 March 2026	Team BIII				
Yayee (Thai: ยาหยี)	Natthathida Asanani (Thai: ณัฏฐธิดา อาสนานิ)	9 October 2001 (age 25)	3rd	6 March 2026	Team BIII				
