= Aitakatta =

2006 single by AKB48

Single by AKB48

from the album Set List: Greatest Songs 2006–2007
- B-side: "Dakedo..."
- Released: 25 October 2006 (19 years ago)
- Genre: Pop
- Length: 17:00
- Label: Defstar
- Songwriters: Yasushi Akimoto, BOUNCEBACK, Michihiko Ōta
- Producer: Yasushi Akimoto

AKB48 singles chronology
"Skirt, Hirari" (2006)	"Aitakatta" (2006)	"Seifuku ga Jama o Suru" (2007)

"Aitakatta" (会いたかった; "I Missed You") is Japanese idol group AKB48's third single, and the first major single released through DefSTAR Records, on 25 October 2006.

Regarded as the signature song of AKB48, the song has continued to be AKB48's most recognizable tune among the public. It was also the theme song for the AKB48 TV show AKBingo! until 2016.

== Promotion ==
With support from DefStar Records, the song has played a major role in causing the public to take notice of AKB48, as it has been frequently used as an introductory song when AKB48 appears on TV programs as guests, including the 58th NHK Kōhaku Uta Gassen. It is also the theme song of their own TV late night show, AKBingo!, which has been broadcast since 2008.

The girls took a trip down to Tateyama, Chiba to film the video clip, with the main dance scenes set at the cliff of the Sunosaki Lighthouse.

Each first pressing CD included a DVD, including Aitakatta's video clip and "AKB48 History: Major Debut e no Kiseki" (AKB48 History 〜メジャーデビューへの軌跡〜, AKB48 History ~Path to their Major Debut~), as well as following premiums.

- Original Trading Cards (one of 3 different designs)
- Limited-time online-only video ConnecteD CD edition (recorded special private video originally distributed as online-only)
- The ultimate right of application (any one of followings:Application must be received by 22 November 2006))
  - Award A: Invitation to "Special Christmas Party 2006" raging with AKB48 Members!" (AKB48メンバーと盛り上がる!「スペシャル・クリスマスパーティー2006」ご招待) 100 pairs (200 persons)
  - Award K: Invitation to AKB48 year-end routine "General clean-up of AKB48 Theater 2006" (AKB48年末恒例 「AKB48劇場大掃除大会2006」ご招待) 50 pairs (100 persons)
  - Award B: Private movies of 20 Senbatsu members of "Aitakatta" recorded on a DVD (「会いたかった」選抜メンバー20名によるプライベート映像(DVD)) 300 persons

== Reception ==
The single charted for six weeks in the top 200, with the highest rank at #12 in 2006, coming back in the top 200 in 2010 and charting since the second week of September 2010. "Aitakatta" sold 25,544 copies, during the first 6 weeks charted on Oricon.

== Personnel ==
The title track involved 20 members selected from Team A and Team K.

- Center: Atsuko Maeda
- Team A - Tomomi Itano, Haruna Kojima, Atsuko Maeda, Minami Minegishi, Rina Nakanishi, Risa Narita, Tomomi Ōe, Mai Oshima, Mariko Shinoda, Minami Takahashi, Hana Tojima
- Team K - Sayaka Akimoto, Tomomi Kasai, Kana Kobayashi, Natsumi Matsubara, Sae Miyazawa, Kayo Noro, Erena Ono, Yuko Oshima, Ayaka Umeda

== Usage in media ==
This song was featured on Season 2, Episode 1 of James May's Cars of the People, as James May was driving a 1980 Mazda 323 around Hiroshima.

The song was also supposed to earn a spot in the 2011 dance video game Just Dance Wii, but it was removed for unknown reasons.

The song was featured in the first two episodes of the Anime The Summer Hikaru Died.

== Track listing ==
No.	Title	Writer(s)	Arranger	Length
1.	"Aitakatta" (会いたかった)	Yasushi Akimoto, BOUNCEBACK	Tomonori Taguchi, Haruo Inatome	3:48
2.	"Dakedo..." (だけど…)	Akimoto, Michihiko Ōta	Tetsuya Fujita	4:37
3.	"Aitakatta (Instrumental)"	Akimoto, BOUNCEBACK	Taguchi, Inatome	3:48
4.	"Dakedo...(Instrumental)"	Akimoto, Ōta	Fujita	4:37
Total length:				17:00

== Charts ==
Chart	Peak position
Aitakatta
Oricon Weekly Chart	12

=== Sales and certifications ===
Chart	Amount
Oricon physical sales	53,934
RIAJ full-length cellphone downloads	Triple Platinum (750,000+)

== Nogizaka46 version ==
Japanese girl group Nogizaka46 covered "Aitakatta", titled "Aitakatta Kamoshirenai" (会いたかったかもしれない; lit. 'I Missed You, Perhaps') with a minor rock sound. It was included as a B-side on the type-B edition of the group's debut single "Guruguru Curtain", released on February 22, 2012. The music video was filmed at the same place as AKB48 in winter, which Rina Ikoma served as a choreographic center. AKB48's member Atsuko Maeda made a cameo appearance for the video, where Ikoma rides a bicycle pass through her.

== BNK48 version ==
"Aitakatta – Yak Cha Dai Phop Thoe"

Single by BNK48

from the album River
- Released: 8 August 2017
- Genre: Pop
- Length: 24:28
- Label: BNK48 Office
- Songwriters: Natapol Srijomkwan; Pongchuk Pissathanporn; Tanupop Notayanont
- Producer: Pongchuk Pissathanporn

BNK48 singles chronology
"Aitakatta – Yak Cha Dai Phop Thoe" (2017)	"Koi Suru Fortune Cookie – Khukki Siangthai" (2017)

Music video
- "Yak Cha Dai Phop Thoe" ("Shoot! I Love You" OST) on YouTube

The Thai idol group BNK48, a sister group of AKB48, covered the song and named it "Yak Cha Dai Phop Thoe" (Thai: อยากจะได้พบเธอ; IPA: [jà:k t͡ɕàʔ dâ:j pʰóp tʰɤː]; "Wanted to Meet You").

=== Production ===
The single was produced by a team led by Pongchuk Pissathanporn (Thai: พงศ์จักร พิษฐานพร) from La-Ong-Fong band.

The Thai lyrics were written by Natapol Srijomkwan (Thai: ณฐพล ศรีจอมขวัญ) from Groove Riders band together with Pongchuk Pissathanporn and Tanupop Notayanont (Thai: ตนุภพ โนทยานนท์) from La-Ong-Fong band.

The cover art of the single, produced by The Uni_form Design Studio, was revealed on 17 July 2017, depicting the sixteen senbatsu members with folded paper representing elements from the songs, as buses from "Ōgoe Diamond" and paper planes from "365 Nichi no Kamihikōki", including elements from the Thai culture, as barb mobiles, and those from the Japanese culture, as paper cranes.

The music video for "Yak Cha Dai Phop Thoe" was directed by Wanweaw Hongvivatana (Thai: วรรณแวว หงษ์วิวัฒน์) and Weawwan Hongvivatana (Thai: แวววรรณ หงษ์วิวัฒน์), twin directors from GDH 559. The video was notably not marketed as the official music video.

=== Promotion ===
The three songs in the single were first performed at the group's debut event on 2 June 2017.

Sixteen members of the group were then selected as senbatsu to promote the single, consisting of Can, Cherprang, Jaa, Jan, Jennis, Kaew, Kaimook, Miori, Music, Namhom, Namneung, Noey, Orn, Pun, Satchan, and Tarwaan. Music serves as the centre for "Aitakatta" and "Ōgoe Diamond", whereas Jennis is the centre for "365 Nichi no Kamihikōki".

A change was made to this set of senbatsu for the event Japan Expo in Thailand 2017, held in Bangkok on 1 and 3 September 2017, after Jan, Kaew, Orn, and Namneung were demoted to undergirls after being found in violation of undisclosed rules (reportedly truancy), and were replaced by Jane, Mobile, Pupe, and Rina Izuta.

To support the single, the group held its first handshake event in Bangkok on 27 August 2017, attracting almost 4,000 fans.

The music video for the song "Yak Cha Dai Phop Thoe" was released on 29 November 2017 after announcing that the song would be used for the soundtrack of the television series, Project S the Series ("Shoot! I Love You" Part).

=== Release and sales ===
The single was officially released on 8 August 2017. Physical CDs were available for purchase from 7 to 19 July 2017 only, during which it sold a total of 13,500 copies.

Critic Nutthapong Chaiwanitphon (Thai: ณัฐพงศ์ ไชยวานิชย์ผล) observed that the total sales for the BNK48 single has been low.

=== Track listing ===
- **Bold** indicates centres.

No.	Title	Lyrics	Performers	Length
1.	"Yak Cha Dai Phop Thoe (Thai: อยากจะได้พบเธอ; "Wanted to Meet You")" (cover of AKB48's "Aitakatta")	Natapol Srijomkwan; Pongchuk Pissathanporn	Can, Cherprang, Jaa, Jan, Jennis, Kaew, Kaimook, Miori, **Music**, Namhom, Namneung, Noey, Orn, Pun, Satchan, Tarwaan	3:48
2.	"Ko Chop Hai Ru Wa Chop (Thai: ก็ชอบให้รู้ว่าชอบ; "I Like You, So I Let You Know That I Like You")" (cover of AKB48's "Ōgoe Diamond")	Tanupop Notayanont	same as the previous song	4:08
3.	"Sam Roi Hoksip Ha Wan Kap Khrueangbin Kradat (Thai: สามร้อยหกสิบห้าวันกับเครื่องบินกระดาษ; "365 Days with Paper Planes")" (cover of AKB48's "365 Nichi no Kamihikōki")	Tanupop	Can, Cherprang, Jaa, Jan, **Jennis**, Kaew, Kaimook, Miori, Music, Namhom, Namneung, Noey, Orn, Pun, Satchan, Tarwaan	4:38
4.	"Yak Cha Dai Phop Thoe" (Off Vocal Version)			3:48
5.	"Ko Chop Hai Ru Wa Chop" (Off Vocal Version)			4:08
6.	"Sam Roi Hoksip Ha Wan Kap Khrueangbin Kradat" (Off Vocal Version)			4:38
Total length:				24:28

== MNL48 version ==
"Aitakatta – Gustong Makita"

Single by MNL48
- Released: 28 September 2018
- Genre: P-Pop; J-pop
- Length: 26:22
- Label: Star Music
- Producers: Yasushi Akimoto; Yasunari Okada; Paulo Kurusawa

MNL48 singles chronology
"Aitakatta – Gustong Makita" (2018)	"Pag-Ibig Fortune Cookie" (2018)

Music video
- "Aitakatta - Gustong Makita" on YouTube

The Filipino idol group MNL48, a sister group of AKB48, covered the song and named it "Gustong Makita" (Want to meet you). It is their first single released on September 28, 2018.

=== Tracklisting ===
- **Bold** indicates centers.

No.	Title	Performers	Length
1.	"Aitakatta - Gustong Makita ("Wanted to Meet You")"	Alice, Faith, Erica, Dani, **Sheki**, Abby, Alyssa, Ella, Jem, Lara, Ash, Tin, Gabb, Sela, Grace, Quincy	3:49
2.	"Talulot ng Sakura ("Petals of Cherry Blossom")"	same as the previous song	5:18
3.	"Umiindak na Saya"	Thea, Ash, Tin, Dian, Gabb, Gia, Kay, Ella, Kyla, **Lei**, Mari, Sela, Grace, Princess, Quincy, Shaina	4:04
4.	"Aitakattta - Gustong Makita" (Off Vocal Version)		3:49
5.	"Talulot ng Sakura" (Off Vocal Version)		5:18
6.	"Umiindak na Saya" (Off Vocal Version)		4:04
Total length:			26:22
