= Chula–Thammasat Traditional Football Match =

Annual football match in Thailand

- Chulalongkorn University Thammasat University
- Native name: งานฟุตบอลประเพณีจุฬาฯ–ธรรมศาสตร์
- Other names: Thammasat–Chula Traditional Football Match
- Sport: Association football
- First meeting: 4 December 1934; Draw, 1–1
- Latest meeting: 15 February 2025; Thammasat, 2–1
- Next meeting: TBD
- Broadcasters: Television Pool of Thailand (1st‍–‍71st match); Thairath TV (72nd–74th match); MCOT HD (75th match)
- Stadiums: Suphachalasai Stadium

Statistics
- Total meetings: 75
- All-time series: Thammasat leads, 25–18–32
- Largest victory: Thammasat, 5–1 (2016)
- Longest win streak: Thammasat, 4 (1964‍–‍1966, 1972‍–‍1978)
- Current win streak: Thammasat, 1

The Chula–Thammasat or Thammasat–Chula Traditional Football Match (the name alternating, with the host's appearing first) is a football match between Chulalongkorn University and Thammasat University. It is held annually, usually in January, at the Suphachalasai Stadium in Bangkok, Thailand. Apart from the match itself (which is not played by strictly varsity teams, but include alumni), the event also focuses on card stunts performed by both sides' audiences, cheerleading, and the opening ceremony parades, of which Thammasat's politics-mocking sequence is an anticipated highlight. The event is regularly broadcast on national television.

== History ==
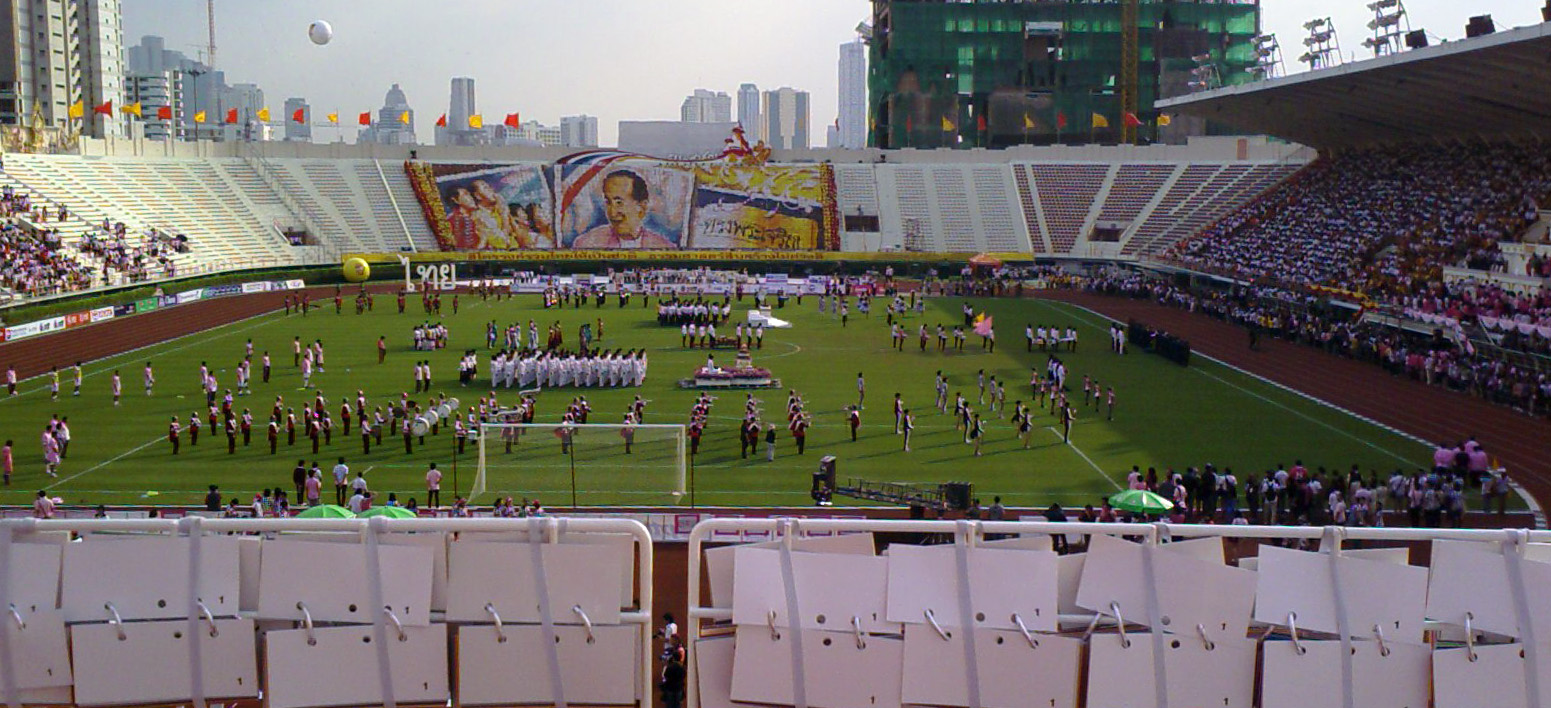
Members of the opening ceremony parade assembled in the field stand at attention as the royal anthem is played during the opening ceremony of the 66th Match. To the far side of the field, Thammasat University's performing audience display a detailed card stunt featuring King Bhumibol Adulyadej. Coloured card booklet "plates" used in such displays are visible in the foreground.

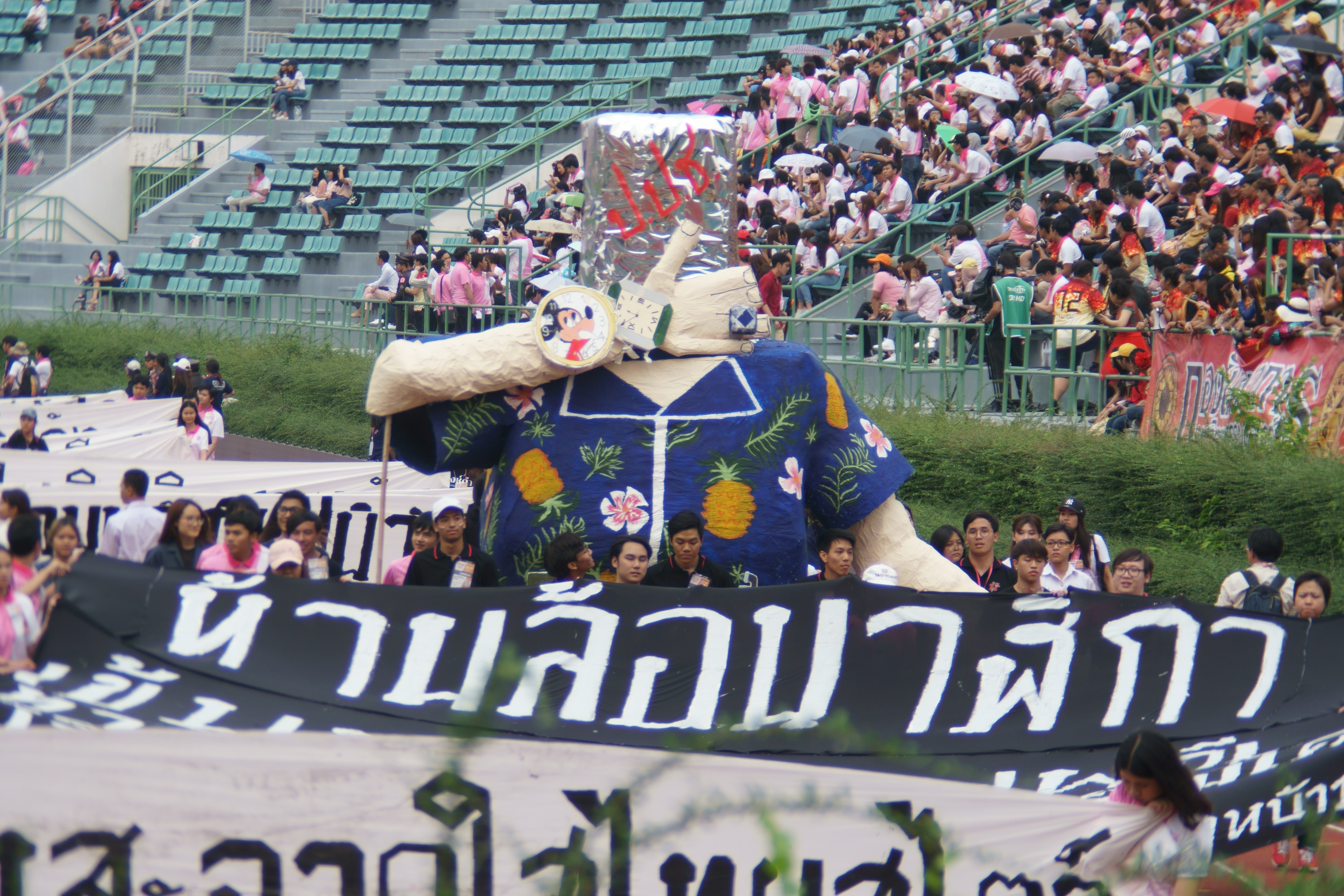
Politics-mocking parade in Chula–Thammasat traditional football match 2018

The match was started in 1934 by alumni of Suankularb Wittayalai School who were studying at both universities, intending it to be a varsity match in the likes of the British Oxford–Cambridge Boat Race. The first match was held on 4 December 1934 at the Sanam Luang field, with Thammasat University as the host. There was a ticket fee of 1 baht, the proceedings of which went to the Anti-tuberculosis Society of Thailand; after-expense earnings from the match have since traditionally been donated to charity.

The two universities alternate roles as hosts. From 1935 to 1937 the match was held at the Suankularb Wittayalai School football field, and since 1938 has been held at Suphachalasai Stadium (also known as the National Stadium), except in 1985, 1986, 1988 and 2008 when the match was held at the Chulalongkorn University Stadium. Starting in 1949, the Royal Cup has been awarded for the match.

The match has been cancelled several times, due to the flooding of Bangkok in 1942, World War II and its aftermath from 1944–1948, the Manhattan Rebellion in 1951, the aftermath of the 14 October 1973 uprising and the 6 October 1976 massacre in 1973–1975 and 1977, political crisis in 2014, and the death of King Bhumibol Adulyadej in 2017. The latest match, the 74th, was hosted by Chulalongkorn University and took place on 8 February 2020.

== Results ==
- Thammasat: 25 wins
- Chulalongkorn: 18 wins
- Draws: 32

Reason

Chulalongkorn win Thammasat win Draw

№	Date	Host	Winner	Score
1	4 December 1934	Thammasat	Draw	1–1
2	1935	Chulalongkorn	Draw	3–3
3	1936	Thammasat	Thammasat	4–1
4	1937	Chulalongkorn	Thammasat	2–1
5	1938	Thammasat	Thammasat	2–1
6	1939	Chulalongkorn	Draw	0–0
7	1940	Thammasat	Draw	2–2
8	1941	Chulalongkorn	Chulalongkorn	2–0
9	1942	Thammasat	Chulalongkorn	3–1
10	30 December 1949	Chulalongkorn	Thammasat	3–2
11	30 December 1950	Thammasat	Chulalongkorn	5–3
12	27 December 1952	Chulalongkorn	Draw	0–0
13	19 December 1953	Thammasat	Thammasat	3–1
14	25 December 1954	Chulalongkorn	Chulalongkorn	1–0
15	24 December 1955	Thammasat	Draw	2–2
16	25 December 1956	Chulalongkorn	Draw	0–0
17	21 December 1957	Thammasat	Thammasat	3–1
18	20 December 1958	Chulalongkorn	Chulalongkorn	3–2
19	26 December 1959	Thammasat	Thammasat	2–1
20	27 December 1960	Chulalongkorn	Draw	1–1
21	23 December 1961	Thammasat	Draw	1–1
22	22 December 1962	Chulalongkorn	Draw	0–0
23	8 January 1964	Thammasat	Thammasat	3–1
24	26 December 1964	Chulalongkorn	Thammasat	3–0
25	25 December 1965	Thammasat	Thammasat	2–1
26	24 December 1966	Chulalongkorn	Thammasat	2–0
27	30 December 1967	Thammasat	Draw	1–1
28	21 December 1968	Chulalongkorn	Chulalongkorn	2–0
29	27 December 1969	Thammasat	Thammasat	1–0
30	30 January 1971	Chulalongkorn	Draw	0–0
31	29 January 1972	Thammasat	Thammasat	4–0
32	23 December 1972	Chulalongkorn	Thammasat	2–1
33	31 January 1976	Thammasat	Thammasat	2–0
34	21 January 1978	Chulalongkorn	hammasat	1–0
35	20 January 1979	Thammasat	Chulalongkorn	2–0
36	19 January 1980	Chulalongkorn	Draw	0–0
37	31 January 1981	Thammasat	Draw	1–1
38	27 January 1982	Chulalongkorn	Draw	2–2
39	29 January 1983	Thammasat	Draw	1–1
40	21 January 1984	Chulalongkorn	Thammasat	1–0
41	27 January 1985	Thammasat	Draw	1–1
42	26 January 1986	Chulalongkorn	Draw	1–1
43	25 January 1987	Thammasat	Thammasat	1–0
44	30 January 1988	Chulalongkorn	Chulalongkorn	2–1
45	21 January 1989	Thammasat	Chulalongkorn	2–1
46	20 January 1990	Chulalongkorn	Draw	1–1
47	19 January 1991	Thammasat	Draw	0–0
48	18 January 1992	Chulalongkorn	Draw	1–1
49	23 January 1993	Thammasat	Thammasat	2–1
50	22 January 1994	Chulalongkorn	Draw	2–2
51	21 January 1995	Thammasat	Chulalongkorn	2–1
52	20 January 1996	Chulalongkorn	Thammasat	1–0
53	18 January 1997	Thammasat	Draw	1–1
54	7 February 1998	Chulalongkorn	Draw	0–0
55	23 January 1999	Thammasat	Chulalongkorn	2–1
56	15 January 2000	Chulalongkorn	Draw	0–0
57	20 January 2001	Thammasat	Chulalongkorn	2–0
58	19 January 2002	Chulalongkorn	Draw	2–2
59	25 January 2003	Thammasat	Draw	0–0
60	24 January 2004	Chulalongkorn	Draw	0–0
61	22 January 2005	Thammasat	Thammasat	1–0
62	21 January 2006	Chulalongkorn	Chulalongkorn	2–0
63	20 January 2007	Thammasat	Draw	1–1
64	17 May 2008	Chulalongkorn	Draw	0–0
65	31 January 2009	Thammasat	Thammasat	2–0
66	16 January 2010	Chulalongkorn	Draw	0–0
67	5 February 2011	Thammasat	Chulalongkorn	3–1
68	25 February 2012	Chulalongkorn	Chulalongkorn	1–0
69	2 February 2013	Thammasat	Chulalongkorn	1–0
70	7 February 2015	Chulalongkorn	Thammasat	2–0
71	13 February 2016	Thammasat	Thammasat	5–1
72	3 February 2018	Chulalongkorn	Draw	1–1
73	9 February 2019	Thammasat	Chulalongkorn	2–1
74	8 February 2020	Chulalongkorn	Chulalongkorn	2–1
75	15 February 2025	Thammasat	Thammasat	2–1

== See also ==
- Football in Thailand
- College rivalry
