= Shihainin =

A shihainin (支配人, lit. "manager") is an authorized representative of a company or unincorporated business under Japanese commercial law.

A shihainin has full legal authority to represent the company/business at the place of business to which the shihainin is assigned. This authority may be restricted, but any restriction is unassertable against a third party acting in good faith.

The status is often granted to the managers of regional or local offices of the company, as well as to managers at the head office. Directors and corporate officers (but not statutory auditors) may be granted shihainin status in addition to any other titles they hold within the company. The term can lead to confusion in translation, as the literal translation of "manager" may be confused with internal "manager" titles that do not necessarily denote shihainin status.

In most businesses, the term is mainly used in corporate legal documents. However, it is popular in certain industries, such as hotels and restaurants, as the sole designation for the manager of a particular property.

Company shihainin are generally appointed by the board of directors. Their name, date of birth, residential address and place of business is recorded in the commercial register at the Legal Affairs Bureau and kept as public record.
