= BNK48 discography =

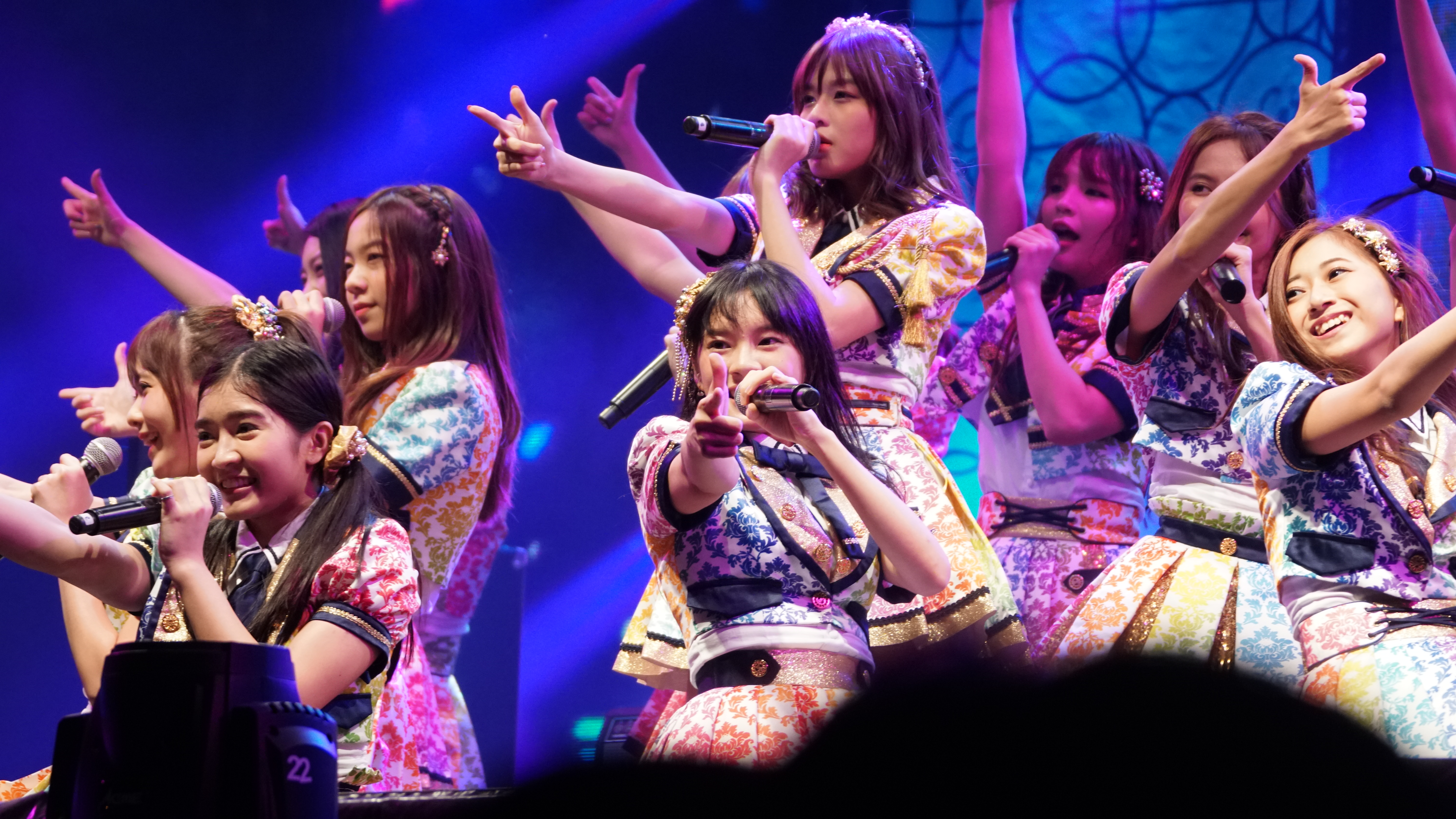
- Studio albums: 6
- Singles: 21
- Music videos: 50

The discography of BNK48 consists of sixteen singles and four studio albums. The major singles have title tracks that are sung by a selection of the BNK48 members, called senbatsu (Japanese: 選抜; "selection"). The songs are covers of the Japanese songs originally recorded by AKB48, the sister group of BNK48, with the Japanese lyrics translated into Thai. And it's the original song with permission from Superball.

== Studio albums ==
Year	No.	Title	Sales	Streaming
2018
2018	1	RIVER	80,000	575,000
2019
2019	2	Jabaja	20,500	350,000
2021
2021	3	Warota People	40,000	162,000
2023	4	Gingham Check		
2024	5	#SukiNanda		
2026	6	Ponytail to Shushu		

== Singles ==
Year	No.	Title	Sales	Streaming	Source	Album
2017	1	"Aitakatta"	13,500	728,000		RIVER
2017	2	"Koisuru Fortune Cookie"	30,000	3,696,000		RIVER
2018	3	"Shonichi"	170,000	1,156,000		RIVER
2018	4	"Kimi wa Melody"	340,000	1,244,000		Jabaja
2018	5	"BNK Festival"	775,000: Limited version (CD) 300,000; Music card (download) 475,000	345,000		Jabaja
2019	6	"Beginner"	166,000	327,000		Jabaja
2019	7	"77 no Suteki na Machi e"	156,000	358,000		Warota People
2020	8	"High Tension"	330,000	234,000		Warota People
2020	9	"Heavy Rotation"	83,800	932,000		Warota People
2021	10	"D.AAA"	68,104	1,193,000		Gingham Check
2022	11	"Sayonara Crawl"	20,000	169,000		Gingham Check
2022	12	"Believers"				Gingham Check
2023	13	"Iiwake Maybe"				Gingham Check
2023	14	"Promise"				Gingham Check
2023	15	"Kibouteki Refrain"				#SukiNanda
2024	16	"Kiss Me!"				#SukiNanda
2024	17	"BORDERLESS"				#SukiNanda
2025	18	"Green Flash"				Ponytail to Shushu
2025	19	"Colorcon Wink"				Ponytail to Shushu
2025	20	"Masaka no Confession"				Ponytail to Shushu
2027	21	"Nagori Zakura"				

== Special Singles ==
Year	Event	Title	Sales	Streaming	Source
2022	1st Generation Special Single	"Jiwaru DAYS"			'
2025	BNK48 & CGM48 Request Hour 2024 Special Song Vote	"RUMOR"			'
2025	Celebrate AKB48 20th Anniversary	"Oh my pumpkin!"			'
2025	BNK48 & CGM48 Concert "CHAPTER: NEXT" Special Song Vote	"12-gatsu no Kangaroo"			
2026	BNK48 & TSH48 Collaboration Single	"Sky Lantern Wish - คำอธิษฐานใต้แสงโคม"			
2026	3rd Generation Special Single	"Celebration"			
2026	Thai-Japanese Special Collaboration Project with Tatuya Ishii & Lamyai Haithongkham	"Kimi ga Iru Dake de - แค่เพียงมีเธอ (2026 Thai- Japanese ver.)"			
2026	Thai-Japanese Special Collaboration Project with Tatuya Ishii	"รำวง Matsuri"			
2026	BNK48 & CGM48 Collaboration Single	"Kimi to Doko ka e Ikitai - อยากจะไปกับเธอ" Kimi to Doko ka e Ikitai - อยากจะไปกับเธอ; Kegareteiru Shinjitsu - ความจริงสีเทา; Aisuru Hito - เธอ; Yobisute Fantasy - เรียกชื่อที ใจไม่ดีแล้ว!			

== Theaters Song ==
Year	Team	Show	Date of Show	Setlist	Ref.
2018	BNK48 Team BIII 1st Stage	"ปาร์ตี้ในฝัน" (PARTY ga Hajimaru yo)	11 May 2018 - 14 December 2019	1. PARTY ga Hajimaru yo (ปาร์ตี้ในฝัน); 2. Dear my Teacher (คุณครูที่รักของฉัน); 3. Doku Ringo wo Tabesasete (แอปเปิลอาบยาพิษ); 4. Skirt, Hirari (พลิ้ว) (Jaa-Kaimook-Noey-Mind-Music); 5. Classmate (เพื่อนคนพิเศษ) (Jane-Namnueng-Mobile-Pun-Pupe); 6. Anata to Christmas Eve (คำสัญญาแห่งคริสต์มาสอีฟ) (Kaew-Taewaan); 7. Kiss wa Dame yo (จูบ...ไม่ได้นะ) (Jennis-Noey-Music); 8. Hoshi no Ondo (อุณหภูมิของดวงดาว) (Cherprang-Kaimook-Korn-Orn); 9. Sakura no Hanabiratachi (ความทรงจำและคำอำลา); 10. Aozora no Soba ni Ite (ฟ้าสีคราม); Encore: 1. BNK48; 2. Skirt, Hirari (พลิ้ว); 3. 365 Nichi no Kamihikouki (365 วันกับเครื่องบินกระดาษ); 4. Sakura no Hanabiratachi (ความทรงจำและคำอำลา)	
2019	-	BNK48 Team BIII Waiting Stage	15 December 2019 - 21 February 2020	1. PARTY ga Hajimaru yo (ปาร์ตี้ในฝัน); 2. Dear my Teacher (คุณครูที่รักของฉัน); 3. Doku Ringo wo Tabesasete (แอปเปิลอาบยาพิษ); 4. Heart Gata Virus (หัวใจไวรัส) (จ๋า, ไข่มุก, มิวสิค); 5. Temodemo no Namida (ถึงแม้จะมีน้ำตา) (ปูเป้, เนย); 6. Mata Anata no Koto wo Kangaeteta (คิดถึง...) (ก่อน, เฌอปราง, ตาหวาน, เจน, มายด์); 7. Yume e no Route (หมื่นเส้นทาง) (มิโอริ, เจนนิษฐ์, โมบายล์, น้ำหนึ่ง, ปัญ, แก้ว); 8. Tsugi no Season (ฤดูใหม่); 9. Kimi no Koto ga Suki Dakara (ก็เพราะว่าชอบเธอ); 10. Sakura no Hanabiratachi (ความทรงจำและคำอำลา); Encore: 1. Aitakatta (อยากจะได้พบเธอ); 2. Oogoe Diamond (ก็ชอบให้รู้ว่าชอบ) (เวอร์ชันพิเศษ); 3. BNK48 (เวอร์ชันพิเศษ); 4. Namida Surprise! (ประกายน้ำตาและรอยยิ้ม) (เวอร์ชันพิเศษ); 5. 365 Nichi no Kamihikouki (365 วันกับเครื่องบินกระดาษ); 6. 77 no Suteki na Machi e (77 ดินแดนแสนวิเศษ)	
2020	BNK48 Team BIII 2nd Stage	"เสียงระฆังแห่งความฝัน"; Saishuu Bell ga Naru	9 August 2020 – Present	1. Mammoth; 2. Saishuu Bell ga Naru; 3. Boyfriend no Tsukurikata; 4. Erai Hito ni Naritakunai; 5. Return Match; 6. Hatsukoi Dorobou; 7. Gomen ne Jewel; 8. Oshibe to Meshibe to Yoru no Chouchou; 9. 18nin Shimai no Uta; 10. Stand up 11. Coolgirl; 12. Kaiyuugyo no Capacity; 13. Ai ni Ikou; Encore: 1. Shamu Neko; 2. Melos no Michi; 3. Sasae	
2020	BNK48 Team NV 1st Stage	"เทพธิดาเธียเตอร์"; Theater no Megami	9 August 2020 – Present	1. Yuuki no Hammer; 2. Inseki no Kakuritsu; 3. Ai no Stripper; 4. Theater no Megami; 5. Hatsukoi yo, Konnichiwa; 6. Arashi no Yoru ni wa 7. Candy; 8. Locker Room Boy; 9. Yokaze no Shiwaza; 10. 100 Meter Conbini; 11. Suki Suki Suki; 12. Sayonara no Kanashibari; 13. Shiokaze no Shoudaijou; Encore: 1. Bokutachi no Kamihikouki; 2. Team NV Oshi; 3. Bokutachi no Kamihikouki	
2024	BNK48 1st Stage	WHISPER ROAR	20 December 2024 – Present	1. For Your Dream; 2. Promise; 3. New Better Day; 4. Bloom; 5. Bualoy Khaiwaan; 6. First Love; 7. Siang Khong Baimai; 8. Cry; 9. Believers; 10. It's Life; 11. WHISPER ROAR; 12. Mai Yaak Non; Encore: 1. Melody Nee; 2. Dek Due; 3. Song of the Day; 4. Klai Mai Klai	

== Unit ==
- Mimigumo: Kaimook, Music, Jaa
- QRRA: Fond, New, Niky, Popper, Paeyah
- Indy Camp: Kaofrang, Myyu, Nine, Panda, Satchan, Stang, Wee (BNK48). Fortune, Marmink, Milk, Nenie (CGM48). Pepo Mellfias.
- eRAA: Earth, Eve, Gygee, Pakwan, Pancake (BNK48). Aom (CGM48).

== Videography ==
=== Own music videos ===
Year	Single No.	Album	Title	Director(s)	Ref(s)
2017	2	RIVER	"Khukki Siangthai"	Chainarong Tampong (Thai: ไชยณรงค์ แต้มพงษ์)	
2017	1	RIVER	"Yak Cha Dai Phop Thoe" (GDH 559's Project S the Series: Shoot! I Love You OST)	Wanweaw Hongvivatana (Thai: วรรณแวว หงษ์วิวัฒน์); Weawwan Hongvivatana (Thai: แวววรรณ หงษ์วิวัฒน์)	
2018	3	RIVER	"Khamsanya Haeng Christmas Eve"	Hiro Inoue	
2018	3	RIVER	"Wan Raek"	Pairat Kumwan (Thai: ไพรัช คุ้มวัน)	
2018	1st Album	RIVER	"RIVER"	Eakarpon Settasuk (Thai: เอกภณ เศรษฐสุข)	
2018	4	Jabaja	"Ruedu Mai"	Pisinee Khaosamai (Thai: พิสิณี ขาวสมัย)	
2018	4	Jabaja	"Thoe Khue Melodi"	Bin Buamuenchol (Thai: บิณฑ์ บัวหมื่นชล)	
2018	5	Jabaja	"BNK Festival"	Nat Yoswatananont; Nattaporn Yiamchawee (Thai: ณัฐพร เยี่ยมฉวี)	
2019	6	Jabaja	"Beginner"	Pisinee Khaosamai (Thai: พิสิณี ขาวสมัย)	
2019	6	Jabaja	"Kimi no Koto ga Suki Dakara"	Atta Hemwadee (Thai: อัตตา เหมวดี)	
2019	2nd Album	Jabaja	"Bye Bye ... MR.Plastic (Kami7 Go Green)" (7-Eleven Thailand Reduce Plastic Campaign)	Roj Jayaphorn (Thai: เสรีโรจน์ ไชยพร)	
2019	6	Jabaja	‘LET U GO’ OST. Where We Belong (Official MV)	Pisinee Khaosamai (Thai: พิสิณี ขาวสมัย)	
2019	2nd Album	Jabaja	"Jabaja"	Autthapol Phoharnrattanakul (Thai: อรรถพล โพธิ์หาญรัตนกุล)	
2019	2nd Album	Jabaja	"Reborn"	Vathusiri Phuwapunyasiri (Thai: วฑูศิริ ภูวปัญญาสิริ) (Korn BNK48); Miori Ohkubo (Miori BNK48)	
2019	Unit Mimigumo	-	"Candy"	Skanbombomb Studio	
2019	7	Warota People	"77 no Suteki na Machi e"	Pattara Lertanan (Thai: ภัทร เลิศอนันต์)	
2019	Unit Mimigumo	-	"Myujikkii"	Skanbombomb Studio	
2019	7	Warota People	"Supporter" (Sai Sub - สายซับ)	Kriangkrai Wachirathamporn (Thai: เกรียงไกร วชิรธรรมพร); Jirassaya Wongsutin (Thai: จิรัศยา วงษ์สุทิน)	
2019	Unit Mimigumo	-	"Heart Gata Virus"	Skanbombomb Studio	
2020	8	Warota People	"Dode di dong" (โดดดิด่ง)	Sukosin Akkrapat (Thai: สุโกสินทร์ อัครพัฒน์)	
2020	8	Warota People	"Jaak Jai Poo Sao Kon Nee" (จากใจผู้สาวคนนี้)	Sukosin Akkrapat (Thai: สุโกสินทร์ อัครพัฒน์)	
2020	8	Warota People	"High Tension"	Krit Boonyarang (Thai: กฤษณ์ บุญญะรัง); Kittipot Thongjam (Thai: กิตติพศ ทองแจ่ม)	
2020	7	Warota People	"It's Me" (Ost.BNK48 Documentary : One Take)	Wiroth Suwannarukgoon (Thai: วิโรจน์ สุวรรณรักษ์กูล)	
2020	7	Warota People	"It's Life" (Ost.BNK48 Documentary : One Take)	Wiroth Suwannarukgoon (Thai: วิโรจน์ สุวรรณรักษ์กูล)	
2020	9	Warota People	"Heavy Rotation"	Eakarpon Settasuk (Thai: เอกภณ เศรษฐสุข)	
2020	9	Warota People	"Hashire! Penguin" (วิ่งไปสิ...เพนกวิน)	Boyzuke (Thai: สุรชาญ มั่นคงวงศ์ศิริ)	
2020	9	Warota People	"Wink Wa 3 Kai" (วิ้งค์ 3 ครั้ง)	Natthaphong Aroonnet (Thai: ณัฐพงษ์ อรุณเนตร์)	
2020	3rd Album	Warota People	"Can you…?" (เธอนั่นแหละ) (Grab Advertising)	Athip Vichuchaianan (Thai: อธิป วิชชุชัยอนันต์)	
2020	Unit LYRA	-	"LYRA"	Thanid PhinThong (Thai: ธนิษฐ์ พิณทอง); Nitta Kaewpiyasawad (Thai: นิษฐกานต์ แก้วปิยสวัสดิ์)	
2020	Unit LYRA	-	"Vanilla"	Paphawee Jinnasith (Thai: ปภาวี จิณสิทธิ์)	
2020	3rd Album	Warota People	"Ma Ma Milk" (Milk Land by Thai-Denmark Advertising)	Skan Ayurapong (Thai: สกัณห์ อายุรพงศ์)	
2021	3rd Album	Warota People	"Warota People"	Boyzuke (Thai: สุรชาญ มั่นคงวงศ์ศิริ); Natthaphong Aroonnet (Thai: ณัฐพงษ์ อรุณเนตร์)	
2021	Unit VYRA	-	"ต๊ะต่อนยอน…Hurry Up!"	Earth; Tim Jirawangso; Yisheng Shi; Mincong Ni	
2021	10	Gingham Check	"D.AAA" (ดีอะ)	Boyzuke (Thai: สุรชาญ มั่นคงวงศ์ศิริ)	
2022	11	Gingham Check	"First Rabbit"	Boyzuke (Thai: สุรชาญ มั่นคงวงศ์ศิริ)	
2022	11	Gingham Check	"Sayonara Crawl"	Putiroj Devakul (Thai: พุฒิโรจน์ เทวกุล ณ อยุธยา)	
2022	-	-	"Mok Kob" (หมกกบ) (Ost.Pha Phee Bauk)	-	
2022	-	-	"Mon Ruk Jing Reed" (มนต์รักจิ้งหรีด) (Ost.Pha Phee Bauk)	-	
2022	12	Gingham Check	"Kinou Yori Motto Suki" (ชอบเธอมากกว่าเมื่อวาน)	SKBB	
2022	12	Gingham Check	"Make Noise"	Bin Buamuenchol (Thai: บิณฑ์ บัวหมื่นชล)	
2022	12	Gingham Check	"Believers"	Putiroj Devakul (Thai: พุฒิโรจน์ เทวกุล ณ อยุธยา)	
2022	1st Generation; Special Single.	-	"Jiwaru DAYS"	Putiroj Devakul (Thai: พุฒิโรจน์ เทวกุล ณ อยุธยา)	
2023	13	Gingham Check	"Shoujotachi yo – วันใหม่"	Wiroth Suwannarukgoon (Thai: วิโรจน์ สุวรรณรักษ์กูล)	
2023	13	Gingham Check	"Iiwake Maybe"	Putiroj Devakul (Thai: พุฒิโรจน์ เทวกุล ณ อยุธยา)	
2023	Unit eRAA	-	"Dek Due" (เด็กดื้อย์)	THICHA T.	
2023	14	Gingham Check	"Promise" (สัญญานะ)	Putiroj Devakul (Thai: พุฒิโรจน์ เทวกุล ณ อยุธยา)	
2023	Unit eRAA	-	"Kang Mor Yai" (แกงหม้อใหญ่)	Chainarong Tampong (Thai: ไชยณรงค์ แต้มพงษ์)	
2023	4th Album	Gingham Check	"Gingham Check"	THICHA T. (Thai: ชลธิชา ทองสุข)	
2023	Unit QRRA	-	"Miracle"	Putiroj Devakul (Thai: พุฒิโรจน์ เทวกุล ณ อยุธยา)	
2023	15	#Sukinanda	"Kibouteki Refrain – แค่นี้ก็พอใจแล้ว"	Too Aussada (Thai: อัศฎา ลิขิตบุญมา); Nutsorr (Thai: สรวิชญ์ เมืองแก้ว)	
2024	16	#Sukinanda	"Kiss Me! (ให้ฉันได้รู้)"	Putiroj Devakul (Thai: พุฒิโรจน์ เทวกุล ณ อยุธยา)	
2024	16	#Sukinanda	"Dare no Koto wo Ichiban Aishiteru? – ที่หนึ่งตรงนั้น เป็นฉันได้ไหม?"	Putiroj Devakul (Thai: พุฒิโรจน์ เทวกุล ณ อยุธยา)	
2024	16	#Sukinanda	"Kurumi to Dialogue – แล้ว…ต้องทำยังไงล่ะ?"	Putiroj Devakul (Thai: พุฒิโรจน์ เทวกุล ณ อยุธยา)	
2024	17	#Sukinanda	"BORDERLESS"	Putiroj Devakul (Thai: พุฒิโรจน์ เทวกุล ณ อยุธยา)	
2024	17	#Sukinanda	"Mirai to wa?"	Putiroj Devakul (Thai: พุฒิโรจน์ เทวกุล ณ อยุธยา)	
2024	17	#Sukinanda	"365-Nichi no Kamihikouki – 365 วันกับเครื่องบินกระดาษ (2024 ver.)"	Putiroj Devakul (Thai: พุฒิโรจน์ เทวกุล ณ อยุธยา)	
2024	5th Album	#Sukinanda	"#Sukinanda"	kenngades.	
2025	18	TBA	"Green Flash"	kenngades.	
2025	BNK48 and CGM48; Requesthour 2024; Special Song Vote	-	"RUMOR"	kenngades.	
2025	19	TBA	"Colorcon Wink"	kenngades.	

=== With others ===
Year	Artist	Single No.	Album	Title	Member	Ref(s)
2018	AKB48, SKE48, HKT48, NGT48, BNK48	53		"Tomodachi ja nai ka?" (Japanese: 友達じゃないか？)"	Cherprang (39th Next Girl)	
2018	AKB48, SKE48, HKT48, NGT48, BNK48	53		"Hitonatsu no Dekigoto" (Japanese: ひと夏の出来事)	Music (72th Upcoming Girl)	
2020	BNK48, CGM48	9	Warota People	"Hashire! Penguin"	Kaimook (center), Bamboo, Gygee, Jib, Korn, Mewnich, Mind, Miori, New, Phukkhom, Ratah, Satchan, Stang (Undergirls)	
2020	BNK48, CGM48	9	Warota People	"Wink wa Sankai"	Jaa (center), Faii, Khamin, Kheng, Myyu, Namsai, Nine, Niky, Pakwan, Panda, View (Next Girls)	
2020	BNK48, CGM48		Warota People	"Warota People"	Gygee (Center), Wee, Orn, Cherprang, Myyu, Pun, Korn, Minmin, Pakwan, New, Jennis	
2022	BNK48, CGM48	11	Gingham Check	"Sayonara Crawl"	Music (Center), Fond (Center), Paeyah (Center), Cherprang, Jane, Jennis, Kaew, Miori, Mobile, Namneung, Noey, Orn, Pun, Pupe, Tarwaan, Gygee, Minmin, New, Phukkhom, Stang, Wee, Fame, Hoop, Mean, Pampam, Peak	
2022	BNK48, CGM48	12	Gingham Check	"Believers"	Mobile (Center), Music, Noey, Namneung, Tarwaan, Pupe, Fond, Minmin, Wee, Gygee, Kaimook, Miori	
2022	BNK48, CGM48	12	Gingham Check	"Make Noise"	Hoop (Center), Phukkhom, Stang, New, Paeyah, Pampam, Mind, Earn, Popper, Jaa, Fame	
2022	BNK48, CGM48	12	Gingham Check	"Kinou Yori Motto Suki"	Jib, Grace, Niky, Yoghurt, Nine, Ratah, Myyu, Pancake, Mean, Earth	
2023	BNK48, CGM48		Gingham Check	"Gingham Check"	Patt, Phukkhom, Gygee, Fond, Wee, Yayee, Pakwan, Miori	
2023	BNK48, CGM48	15	#SukiNanda	"Kibouteki Refrain"	Hoop (Center), Earn, Fond, Gygee, Janry, L, Marine, Minmin, Nene, Paeyah, Pancake, Popper, Stang, Wee, Yoghurt	
2024	BNK48, CGM48	16	#SukiNanda	"Kiss Me!"	Paeyah, Minmin, Pancake, Wee, Stang, Monet, Hoop, Grace	
2024	BNK48, CGM48	16	#SukiNanda	"Dare no Koto wo Ichiban Aishiteru?"	Popper, L, Jaokhem, Yoghurt, Fame, Kaofrang, Khamin, New, Peak	
2024	BNK48, CGM48	16	#SukiNanda	"Kurumi to Dialogue"	Panda (Center), Marine, Janry, Earn, Nine, Emmy, Mean, Satchan, Palmmy	
2025	BNK48, CGM48	19	TBA	"Colorcon Wink"	Pancake (Center), Hoop, Popper, Yoghurt, L, Jew, Grace, Neen	
2025	BNK48, CGM48	19	TBA	"Chouhatsu no Aozora"	Earn (Center), Kaofrang, Janry, Mean, Arlee, Emmy, Wawa, Saonoi, Micha, Niya	
2025	BNK48, CGM48	19	TBA	"11-gatsu no Anklet"	Nammonn (Center), Marine, Nall, Patt, Palmmy, Proud, Sindy, Galeya, Khaimook	
2025	AKB48, JKT48, BNK48, MNL48, AKB48 Team SH, AKB48 Team TP, CGM48, KLP48	66		"Oh My Pumpkin!"	Hoop	

=== Music video appearances ===
Year	Title	Artist	Participating member(s)	Director(s)	Ref(s)
2018	"Chukachu" (Thai: ชู้กะชู้)	Pongchuk Pissathanporn (Thai: พงศ์จักร พิษฐานพร)	All (1st generation)		
2018	"Keep Going" (App War OST)	Boom Boom Cash	Orn		
2018	"Tit Talok" (Thai: ติดตลก)	Pramote Pathan (Thai: ปราโมทย์ ปาทาน)	Jane		
2019	"Yak Mee Fan Laew" (Thai: อยากมีแฟนแล้ว)	Lipta (Thai: ลิปตา)	Juné		
2019	"The Lucky One" (Thai: ผู้โชคดี) (Ost.Great Men Academy)	9x9	New		
2019	"Rak Thoe Thao Thi Thoe Mai Rak (0%) " (Thai: รักเธอเท่าที่เธอไม่รัก (0%))	DoubleBam	Kaew		
2019	"Siang Khorong Khong Khon Siachai" (Thai: เสียงขอร้องของคนเสียใจ)	Dome Pakorn Lam (Thai: โดม ปกรณ์ ลัม)	Noey		
2019	"Khet Ham Huang" (Thai: เขตห้ามหวง)	Tor Saksit (Thai: โต๋ ศักดิ์สิทธิ์)	Phukkhom	Pitchaya Jarusboonpracha	
2019	"Present" (Thai: แค่นี้...พอ)	The Parkinson	Mobile		
2019	"Black Heart" (Thai: หัวใจที่มืดมิด)	Zeal	Cherprang	Parkpoom Wongpoom	
2020	"Another You" (Thai: ไม่ควรมีคนเดียว)	Palitchoke Ayanaputra (Thai: ผลิตโชค อายนบุตร)	Cherprang	Eakarpon Settasuk	

== Filmography ==
=== Films ===
Year	Title	Participating member(s)	Director(s)	Notes	Ref(s)
2018	App War	Orn	Yanyong Kuruaungkoul (Thai: ยรรยง คุรุอังกูร)		
2018	BNK48: Girls Don't Cry	All (1st Generation)	Nawapol Thamrongrattanarit (Thai: นวพล ธำรงรัตนฤทธิ์)	Documentary film	
2018	Homestay	Cherprang	Parkpoom Wongpoom (Thai: ภาคภูมิ วงศ์ภูมิ)		
2019	Sister	Mewnich	Prachya Pinkaew (Thai: ปรัชญา ปิ่นแก้ว)		
2019	Where We Belong	Faii, Jennis, Music, Namneung, Orn, Panda, Pupe, Tarwaan	Kongdej Jaturanrasamee (Thai: คงเดช จาตุรันต์รัศมี)		
2019	Me Before We (Official Short Film : Where We Belong)	Faii, Jennis, Music, Namneung, Panda, Tarwaan	Kongdej Jaturanrasamee (Thai: คงเดช จาตุรันต์รัศมี)		
2020	Thibaan X BNK48 Jaak Jai Poo Sao Kon Nee	Kaew, Kaimook, Mobile, Namneung, Namsai, Noey, Pupe, Tarwaan	Surasak Pongson (Thai: สุรศักดิ์ ป้องศร); Thiti Srinual (Thai: ธิติ ศรีนวล		
2020	BNK48: One Take	All (1st Generation, 2nd Generation)	Manatanan Panlertwongsakul (Thai: มนัสนันท์ พันเลิศวงศ์สกุล)	Documentary film	
2020	Mother Gamer	Wee	Yanyong Kuruaungkoul (Thai: ยรรยง คุรุอังกูร)		
2022	Term 2 Sayong-Kwan	Music	Pattaraporn Werasakwong (Thai: ภัทรภร วีระศักดิ์วงศ์)		
2022	SLR	Cherprang	(Thai: เลิศศิริ บุญมี) (Thai: วุฒิชัย วงศ์นภดล}		
2022	Pha Phee Bauk	Gygee, Mobile, Namneung, Pupe, Wee	Natthaphong Aroonnet (Thai: ณัฐพงษ์ อรุณเนตร์)		
2022	The Cheese Sisters	Namneung, Noey, Pun, Jennis, Wee, Fond, Kaning (CGM48), Marmink (CGM48)			
2022	Face of Anne	Music, Jennis	Kongdej Jaturanrasamee (Thai: คงเดช จาตุรันต์รัศมี)		

=== Television shows ===
Year	Title	Network	Participating member(s)	Notes	Ref(s)
2017	BNK48 Senpai	3 SD	All (1st generation)	Documentary	
2017	BNK48 Show	3 SD	All (1st generation)	Variety show	
2017	SNAP Project (Season 2)	Nation TV	Maysa, Orn	Travel show, episodes 5–10	
2018	Phuean Ruam Thang the Journey (Thai: เพื่อนร่วมทางเดอะเจอร์นีย์)	MCOT HD	Jan, Kaew, Pun, Tarwaan	Travel show	
2018	Aitakatta! Nippon	Amarin TV	Jane, Jennis, Kate, Mobile, Nink, Pupe	Travel show	
2018	Aniparade	One 31	Fond, Juné, Jib, Mewnich, Music, Panda, Piam, Pupe	Variety show	
2018	Victory BNK48	Workpoint TV	All	Variety show	
2018	BNK48 Senpai: 2nd Generation	Workpoint TV	All (2nd generation)	Documentary	
2019	Catch Your Dream - Study in Japan	3 SD	Mobile, Stefi (JKT48)	Travel Show	
2019	Beartai BNK48 it unit	YouTube	Jane, Orn, Natherine	Variety show	
2019	ii ne Japan	MCOT HD	Noey, Namneung, Miori, Phukkhom, Aom, Cake	Travel Show	
2019	The Ska X BNK48	YouTube	Bamboo, Maira, Gygee, Kaimook, Mobile, Pupe	Variety show	
2019	Fun X Fun Japan!	GMM25	Music, Jane, Kumachan (SKE48), Egochan (SKE48), Churi (SKE48)	Travel Show	
2020	BNK48 Senpai 3rd Generation	AIS Play	All (3rd generation)	Documentary	

=== Drama ===
Year	Title	Network	Participating member(s)	Notes	Ref(s)
2018	Be My Boy the Series	Channel 5	Jennis	Drama	
2018	Notification	3 HD	Jan, Jennis, Music, Namneung, Noey, Orn	Series	
2018	Social Death Vote	3 SD	Fond	Series	
2019	Great Men Academy	LINE TV, One 31	New	Series	
2019	One Year	LINE TV, One 31	Cherprang, Jane, Namsai, Pun, Fond, Juné, Mewnich, Wee	Series	
2019	Khao Wan Hai Nu Pen Sailap	3 HD	Jaa	Drama	
2019	BNK48 Story	TV5 Cambodia	All (1st Generation, 2nd Generation)	Present BNK48 in Cambodia	
2019	Clean and Jerk (Luk Lek Dek Chop Yok)	ThaiPBS	Orn, Khamin, Minmin	Series	
2020	Cat Radio TV	3 HD, Line TV	Cherprang	Series	
2020	The Underclass	GMM25, Netflix	Music, Mewnich, Faii, Fond, Pakwan, Jaa, Stang, Piam, Korn, Miori, Jib	Series	
2020	Bad Genius The Series	One 31, We TV	Juné	Series	
2021	Dao Kon La Duang	3 HD	Minmin	Drama	
2021	Love Pharmacy	Bugaboo TV	Orn	Series	
2021	Let's Fight Ghost	True Asian Series, Netflix; True ID, True4U	Orn, Korn	Series	
2022	Cat Radio TV Season 2	3 HD	Cherprang, Pun	Series	
2022	The Rhythm of Life	ThaiPBS	Mobile	Drama	
2022	Budsaba Lui Fire	ThaiPBS	Cherprang	Drama	
2022	The Broken Us	ThaiPBS	Jennis	Drama	
2022	Thank You Teacher	True4U	Cherprang, Hoop	Series	
2022	School Tales Series	3 HD, Netflix	Jennis, Orn	Series	

== Concerts ==
48 Groups

Year(s)	Title	Date(s)	Place	Notes	Ref(s)
2017	BNK48 We Love You	23 September	Quartier Water Garden, The EmQuartier, Bangkok	Marking the graduation of Kidcat	
2017	BNK48 Mini Live and Handshake	18 November	Kamphaeng Phet Auditorium, J.J Mall, Bangkok	Marking the graduation of Cincin	
2017	BNK48 We Wish You	24 December	KBank Siam Pic-Ganesha Theatre, Bangkok	Celebrating Christmas	
2018	BNK48 1st Concert Starto	31 March & 1 April	BITEC, Hall 106, Bangkok	First full concert	
2018	AKB48 53rd Single Sekai Senbatsu Sousenkyo Concert "Sekai no Center wa dare ha?"	16 June	Nagoya Dome, Nagoya, Japan	Concert Before AKB48 53rd Single Sekai Senbatsu Sousenkyo	
2018	Thailand for Attapeu	31 July	KBank Siam Pic-Ganesha Theatre, Bangkok	Charity concert in support of Attapeu dam collapse victims	
2018	BNK48 1st 2gether Concert	15 September	CentralWorld Square, Bangkok	Free concert joined by all the 1st and 2nd generation members	
2018	BNK48 D-DAY Jiradapa Produced Concert	23 October	KBank Siam Pic-Ganesha Theatre, Bangkok	Produced by Pupe	
2019	BNK48 Space Mission Concert	26 January	Impact Arena Muang Thong Thani, Nonthaburi	BNK48 6th Single Senbatsu General Election Concert	
2019	AKB48 Group Asia Festival 2019 in Bangkok	27 January	Impact Arena Muang Thong Thani, Nonthaburi	AKB48 Groups Concert with Overseas Sister Group (AKB48 / JKT48 / BNK48 / MNL48 / Team SH / Team TP / SGO48)	
2019	BNK48 Thank you and The Beginner	2 March	Hard Rock Café Front Space @ Siam Square, Bangkok	Thank you Concert 6th Single General Election and Opening Beginner Single	
2019	BNK48 Thank you and The Beginner	23-24 March	Central Hatyai, Songkhla	Thank you Concert 6th Single General Election and Group Hi-Touch	
2019	BNK48 Thank you and The Beginner	27-28 April	Central Khonkaen, Khonkaen	Thank you Concert 6th Single General Election and Group Hi-Touch	
2019	BNK48 Thank you and The Beginner	10-12 May	Central Rayong, Rayong	Thank you Concert 6th Single General Election and Group Hi-Touch	
2019	BNK48 Thank you and The Beginner	31 May & 1–2 June	Central Chiangmai (CentralFestival Chiangmai), Chiangmai	Thank you Concert 6th Single General Election and Group Hi-Touch	
2019	A Passage To Fly	7-8 May	KBank Siam Pic-Ganesha Theatre, Bangkok	Kaew first solo concert	
2019	Everybody says Jabaja! at Icon Siam	5 July	Icon Siam, Bangkok	Opening BNK48 2nd Album "Jabaja"	
2019	BNK48 say Jabaja Roadshow in Chiangmai	13-14 July	Central Chiangmai Airport, Chiangmai	Mini Concert and Group Handshake	
2019	AKB48 Group Asia Festival 2019 in Shanghai	24 August	National Exhibition and Convention Center Shanghai, Shanghai, China	AKB48 Groups Concert with Overseas Sister Group (AKB48 / JKT48 / BNK48 / MNL48 / Team SH / Team TP / SGO48)	
2019	BNK48 The Journey to 7th Single "77 no sutekina machi e"	30 October	The Street Ratchada, Bangkok	Opening BNK48 7th Single "77 no suteki na machi e"	
2019	BNK48 2nd Generation Blooming Season Concert	2 November	BITEC, Hall 106, Bangkok	BNK48 2nd Generation Concert	
2020	BNK48 Welcome to High Tension Company	23 February	River Park @ Icon Siam, Bangkok	Opening BNK48 8th Single "High Tension"	
2020	BNK48 Wonderland	26 July	Ultra Arena Hall, ShowDC, Bangkok	9th Single Senbatsu General Election Ceremony. Opening BNK48 9th Single "Heavy Rotation"	
2021	AKB48 Group Asia Festival 2021 Online	27 June	Tokyo Dome City Hall, Tokyo, Japan	AKB48 Groups Concert with Overseas Sister Group (AKB48 / JKT48 / BNK48 / MNL48 / Team SH / Team TP / SGO48 / CGM48)	
2022	BNK48 3rd GENERATION: THE DE3UT	7 February	Event Area @ CentralWorld	BNK48 3rd Generation Concert	
2022	BNK48 11th Single “Sayonara Crawl” First Performance	20 March	Asiatique Park, Asiatique The Riverfront, Bangkok	Opening BNK48 11th Single "Sayonara Crawl"	
2022	Indy Camp Concert	21 August	ChangChui: Creative Park		
2022	BNK48 & CGM48 Request Hour 2022	30 October	Union Hall, Union Mall, Bangkok		
2022	BNK48 1st Gen Special Single “Jiwaru DAYS” First Performance	20 November	Riversquare, Terminal 21 Rama 3, Bangkok	Opening BNK48 1st Gen Special Single "Jiwaru DAYS"	
2022	BNK48 1st Generation Concert "Dan D'1ion"	18 December	BITEC, Hall 98, Bangkok	BNK48 1st Generation Special graduation Concert.	
2023	AKB48 Group CIRCLE JAM 2023	4 February	centralwOrld LIVE CentralWorld	AKB48 Groups Concert with Overseas Sister Group (AKB48 / BNK48 / CGM48)	
2023	BNK48 3rd Generation Concert "Rabbit In Wonderland"	5 August	Union Hall, Union Mall, Bangkok	BNK48 3rd Generation Concert.	
2023	BNK48 vs CGM48 Concert "The Battle of idols"	6 August	Union Hall, Union Mall, Bangkok	BNK48 & CGM48 Battle Concert.	
2023	DEPART'CHER – Cherprang BNK48’s Graduation Concert	29 October	Thunder Dome Muang Thong Thani, Nonthaburi	Cherprang BNK48 graduation Concert.	
2024	Last Season - BNK48 2nd Generation Graduation Concert	28 April	Centerpoint Studio, Bangkok	BNK48 2nd Generation graduation Concert.	
2024	Paeyah’s Graduation Ceremony	23 June	Ultra Arena Hall, Bravo BKK, Bangkok	Paeyah BNK48 graduation Concert.	
2024	BNK48 Music Box - First Live Concert "Journey of กล่องเสียงของฉัน""	31 August	Mr.FOX Live House		
2025	Last Flight - Popper's Graduation Ceremony"	9 August	Ultra Arena Hall, Bravo BKK, Bangkok	Popper BNK48 graduation Concert.	
2025	BNK48 & CGM48 CONCERT CHAPTER: NEXT"	23 August	MCC Hall, The Mall Lifestyle Bangkapil, Bangkok	BNK48 4th, 5th, and 6th Generation and CGM48 2nd, 3rd and 4th Generation Concert.	
2026	“Once upon a time...the Rabbits were born”	1 March	Island Hall, Fashion Island, Bangkok	BNK48 3rd Generation Graduation Concert	

== Bibliography ==
=== Senbatsu General Election Books ===
Year	Title	Author(s)	Ref(s)
2019	BNK48 6th Single Senbatsu General Election Official Book	BNK48 Office, Mango Zero	
2020	BNK48 9th Single Senbatsu General Election Book	iAM	

=== Photo books ===
Year	Title	Ref(s)
2018	The Sisters	
2019	Kami VII	
2019	The Frozer	

=== Other books ===
Year	Title	Author(s)	Ref(s)
2018	B Side.	Peerapit Chuasomboon (Thai: พีรพิชญ์ ฉั่วสมบูรณ์); Thanyawat Ippoodom (Thai: ธัญวัฒน์ อิพภูดม)	
2019	Orn The Way	Patchanan Jiajirachote (Thai: พัศชนันท์ เจียจิรโชติ)	
2019	BNK48 2nd Year Anniversary	BNK48 Office, Mango Zero	

== Commercials and endorsements ==
Year	Product/project	Producer	Ref(s)
2018	A.P Honda Racing Thailand	A.P Honda	
2018	Yayoi Japanese Restaurant	MK Restaurant Group	
2018	TruePoint × BNK48	True Corporation	
2018	Fujifilm X-A5	Fujifilm Thailand	
2018	BNK48 × Changsuek	Football Association of Thailand	
2018	Jele Beautie x BNK48	S.N.N.P. Intertrade	
2018	Lactasoy x BNK48	Lactasoy Company Limited	
2018	Samsung Galaxy J8 x BNK48	Samsung Thailand	
2018	Toyota Yaris ATIV x BNK48	Toyota Motor Thailand	
