= River (AKB48 song) =

2009 single by AKB48

- Regular Edition cover

Single by AKB48

from the album Kamikyokutachi
- B-side: Kimi no Koto ga Suki Dakara" "Hikōkigumo (Theater Girls Ver.)
- Released: October 21, 2009 (Japan); October 26, 2024 (India)
- Genre: J-pop
- Label: You, Be Cool! / King
- Songwriters: Yasushi Akimoto (lyrics); Yoshimasa Inoue(music)
- Producer: Yasushi Akimoto

AKB48 singles chronology
"Iiwake Maybe" (2009)	"River" (2009)	"Sakura no Shiori" (2010)

Music videos
- River on YouTube
- Kimi no Koto Suki Dakara on YouTube
- Hikōkigumo (Theater Girls Ver.) on YouTube

Alternative cover

"River" is the 14th major single by the Japanese idol group AKB48, released on 21 October 2009. It was the first AKB48 single to top the Oricon weekly singles chart, having sold 179,000 copies in its first week. Thus it became the group's best selling single, beating "Namida Surprise!", which by then had sold 144,000 copies in 18 weeks.

== Music video ==
The music video was filmed at Iruma Air Base.

== Release ==
The single was released in two versions: Regular Edition (通常盤) (CD+DVD, catalog number KIZM-43/4); and Theater Edition (劇場盤) (CD only, catalog number NMAX-1087). The bonuses for the first-press limited edition included a handshake event ticket for various locations (Sendai, Nagoya, Osaka, Hiroshima, Fukuoka, Sapporo, Tokyo), as well as a voting card for the AKB48 Request Hour Set List Best 100 2010. On the theater edition, the bonuses included a handshake event ticket (Tokyo Big Sight, SKE48 Theater), a special performance ticket lottery (live stage performances, karaoke competition, AKB meeting), and a random member photo.

== Track listing ==
All lyrics are written by Yasushi Akimoto.

CD
No.	Title	Music	Arranger	Length
1.	"River"	Yoshimasa Inoue	Yoshimasa Inoue
2.	"Kimi no Koto ga Suki Dakara / Under Girls" (君のことが好きだから / アンダーガールズ "Because I love you")	Tetsurō Oda	Yūichi "Masa" Nonaka
3.	"Hikōkigumo (Theater Girls Ver.) / Theater Girls" (ひこうき雲（シアターガールズver.） / シアターガールズ)	Hideki Naruse	Nonaka
4.	"River (off vocal ver.)"	Inoue
5.	"Kimi no Koto ga Suki Dakara (off vocal ver.)"	Oda
Total length:				21:43

DVD
No.	Title	Length
1.	"River (music video)"
2.	"Kimi no Koto ga Suki Dakara (music video)"
3.	"Hikōkigumo (Theater Girls ver.) (music video)"
4.	"Shifuku no Toki Special ~Date no Toki ni Iwaretai Hitokoto~" (私服のときスペシャル ～デートの時に言われたい一言～ "Informal clothes special ~A word I want to say on a date~")

== Members ==
(Team affiliation at the time of the release.)

=== "River" ===
(Front members are in bold, Centers: Atsuko Maeda and Minami Takahashi)

- Team A: **Haruna Kojima**, **Mariko Shinoda**, **Minami Takahashi**, **Atsuko Maeda**
- Team A > Team K: **Tomomi Itano**, Minami Minegishi
- Team A > Team B: Rie Kitahara, Miho Miyazaki
- Team K: Sayaka Akimoto, **Yūko Ōshima**, Erena Ono, Sae Miyazawa
- Team K > Team B: Tomomi Kasai
- Team B: Yuki Kashiwagi, **Mayu Watanabe**
- SKE48 Team S: **Jurina Matsui**

=== "Kimi no Koto ga Suki Dakara" ===
Performed by Under Girls: (Front members are in bold, Center: Aki Takajō)

- Team A: **Aki Takajō**
- Team A > Team K: **Reina Fujie**
- Team A > Team B: **Amina Satō**
- Team K > Team A: **Asuka Kuramochi**
- Team K > Team B: Manami Oku
- Team B > Team A: **Aika Ōta**, Haruka Katayama, **Rino Sashihara**, Haruka Nakagawa
- Team B > Team K: **Moeno Nitō**
- AKB48 Kenkyūsei > Team A: Ami Maeda
- AKB48 Kenkyūsei > Team K: Ayaka Kikuchi
- AKB48 Kenkyūsei > Team B: Haruka Ishida, Mika Komori, Sumire Sato
- SKE48 Team S: **Rena Matsui**

=== "Hikōkigumo" ===
Theater Girls:

- Team A: Chisato Nakata
- Team K: Ayaka Umeda
- Team K > Team A: Natsumi Matsubara
- Team K > Team B: Kana Kobayashi, Natsuki Sato, Yuka Masuda
- Team B: Natsumi Hirajima
- Team B > Team A: Sakaya Nakaya
- Team B > Team K: Miku Tanabe, Rumi Yonezawa
- AKB48 Kenkyūsei > Team A: Misaki Iwasa, Shizuka Ōya, Mariya Suzuki
- AKB48 Kenkyūsei > Team K: Mayumi Uchida, Tomomi Nakatsuka, Misato Nonaka, Sakiko Matsui
- AKB48 Kenkyūsei > Team B: Rina Chikano

== Charts ==
Chart (2009)	Peak position
Japan (Oricon Weekly Singles Chart)	1
Japan Hot 100 (Billboard)	2
Japan (RIAJ Digital Track Chart)	17

== JKT48 version ==
"River"
- Regular Edition

Single by JKT48

from the album Mahagita
- B-side: "Sakura no Shiori" "Mirai no Kajitsu" "Kimi ni Au Tabi Koi wo Suru" (Regular Edition)
- Released: May 11, 2013 (Theater Edition); May 17, 2013 (Regular Edition)
- Genre: Pop
- Label: Hits

JKT48 singles chronology
"River" (2013)	"Yuuhi wo miteiru ka? -Apakah Kau Melihat Mentari Senja?-" (2013)

Alternative cover

"River" was the first single of the Indonesian idol group JKT48, released on 11 May 2013 under the label Hits Records. It has been performed by selected members from JKT48's Team J and JKT48 trainees. The single is JKT48's version of AKB48's song.

=== Track listing ===
The single has two versions: Regular Edition (CD+DVD); and Theater Edition (CD only).

==== Regular edition ====
CD
No.	Title	Writer(s)	Length
1.	"River"	Yasushi Akimoto, Yoshimasa Inoue
2.	"Mirai no Kajitsu" (Buah Masa Depan)
3.	"Sakura no Shiori" (Pembatas Buku Sakura)
4.	"Kimi ni Au Tabi Koi wo Suru" (Jatuh Cinta Setiap Bertemu Denganmu)

DVD
No.	Title	Length
1.	"River Music Video"
2.	"River Behind the Scenes"
3.	"Mirai no Kajitsu Behind the Scenes"

Bonus

- Special Photo
- JKT48 Card Battle Game Digital Card

==== Theater edition ====
CD
No.	Title	Writer(s)	Length
1.	"River"	Yasushi Akimoto, Yoshimasa Inoue
2.	"Mirai no Kajitsu" (Buah Masa Depan)
3.	"Sakura no Shiori" (Pembatas Buku Sakura)

Bonus

- JKT48 Trump Card
- Handshake ticket

=== Personnel ===
==== "River" ====
Center: Melody Nurramdhani Laksani, Devi Kinal Putri

- Team J: Aki Takajo, Ayana Shahab, Beby Chaesara Anadila, Delima Rizky, Devi Kinal Putri, Gabriela Margareth Warouw, Haruka Nakagawa, Jessica Vania, Jessica Veranda, Melody Nurramdhani Laksani, Nabilah Ratna Ayu Azalia, Rena Nozawa, Rezky Wiranti Dhike, Rica Leyona, Shania Junianatha, Stella Cornelia

==== "Mirai no Kajitsu -Buah Masa Depan-" ====
- Trainee: Alicia Chanzia, Annisa Athia, Cindy Yuvia, Della Della, Jennifer Hanna, Lidya Maulida Djuhandar, Natalia, Noella Sisterina, Octi Sevpin, Ratu Vienny Fitrilya, Riskha Fairunissa, Rona Anggreani, Shinta Naomi, Sinka Juliani, Thalia, Viviyona Apriani

==== "Sakura no Shiori -Pembatas Buku Sakura-" ====
- Team J: Aki Takajo, Ayana Shahab, Beby Chaesara Anadila, Cindy Gulla, Delima Rizky, Devi Kinal Putri, Diasta Priswarini, Frieska Anastasia Laksani, Gabriela Margareth Warouw, Ghaida Farisya, Haruka Nakagawa, Jessica Vania, Jessica Veranda, Melody Nurramdhani Laksani, Nabilah Ratna Ayu Azalia, Rena Nozawa, Rezky Wiranti Dhike, Rica Leyona, Sendy Ariani, Shania Junianatha, Sonia Natalia, Sonya Pandawarman, Stella Cornelia
- Trainee: Alicia Chanzia, Annisa Athia, Cindy Yuvia, Della Delila, Dellia Erdita, Dena Siti Rohayati, Dwi Putri Bonita, Fakhiryani Shafariyanti, Intar Putri Kariina, Jennifer Hanna, Jennifer Rachel Natasya, Lidya Maulida Djuhandar, Nadhifa Karimah, Nadila Cindy Wantari, Natalia, Noella Sisterina, Novinta Dhini, Octi Sevpin, Priscilla Sari Dewi, Ratu Vienny Fitrilya, Riskha Fairunissa, Rona Anggreani, Saktia Oktapyani, Shinta Naomi, Sinka Juliani, Thalia, Thalia Ivanka Elizabeth, Viviyona Apriani

==== "Kimi ni Autabi Koi wo Suru -Jatuh Cinta Setiap Bertemu Denganmu-" ====
- Team J: Aki Takajo, Ayana Shahab, Beby Chaesara Anadila, Cindy Gulla, Devi Kinal Putri, Gabriela Margareth Warouw, Ghaida Farisya, Haruka Nakagawa, Jessica Vania, Jessica Veranda, Melody Nurramdhani Laksani, Nabilah Ratna Ayu Azalia, Rena Nozawa, Rezky Wiranti Dhike, Sendy Ariani, Shania Junianatha

== BNK48 version ==
River

Studio album by BNK48
- Released: 4 August 2018
- Genres: Thai pop; Pop rock
- Length: 53:32
- Label: iAM
- Producer: Yasushi Akimoto

BNK48 chronology
River (2018)	Jabaja (2019)

Singles from River
- 1. "Aitakatta (อยากจะได้พบเธอ)" Released: August 8, 2017; 2. "Koi Suru Fortune Cookie (คุกกี้เสี่ยงทาย)" Released: December 20, 2017; 3. "Shonichi (วันแรก)" Released: May 7, 2018

Alternative cover

Music video
- "River" on YouTube

The Thai idol group BNK48, a sister group of AKB48 in Thailand, covered the song with the same name. It is their first studio album including songs from previous singles, Aitakatta (อยากจะได้พบเธอ), Koi Suru Fortune Cookie (คุกกี้เสี่ยงทาย), and Shonichi(วันแรก) released on August 4, 2018.

=== Track listing ===
No.	Title	Length
1.	"River" (cover of AKB48's "River")	4:44
2.	"Aitakatta (อยากจะได้พบเธอ)"	3:49
3.	"Oogoe Diamond (ก็ชอบให้รู้ว่าชอบ)"	4:07
4.	"365nichi no Kamihikouki (365 วันกับเครื่องบินกระดาษ)"	4:40
5.	"Koi Suru Fortune Cookie (คุกกี้เสี่ยงทาย)"	4:47
6.	"BNK48 (Bangkok 48)"	4:00
7.	"Skirt, Hirari (พลิ้ว)"	4:03
8.	"Shonichi (วันแรก)"	3:49
9.	"Sakura no Hanabiratachi (ความทรงจำและคำอำลา)"	5:18
10.	"Namida Surprise! (ประกายน้ำตาและรอยยิ้ม)"	4:41
11.	"Anata to Christmas Eve (คำสัญญาแห่งคริสต์มาสอีฟ)"	4:50
12.	"River" (Off Vocal Version)	4:44
Total length:		53:32

=== Personnel ===
- **Bold** indicates centres.

==== River ====
- Team BIII: Cherprang Areekul, Isarapa Thawatpakdee (Tarwaan), Jennis Oprasert, Jiradapa Intajak (Pupe), Kanteera Wadcharathadsanakul (Noey), Kunjiranut Intarasin (Jane), Milin Dokthian (Namneung), Natruja Chutiwansopon (Kaew), Nayika Srinian (Can), **Patchanan Jiajirachote (Orn)**, Pichayapa Natha (Namsai), Pimrapat Phadungwatanachok (Mobile), Praewa Suthamphong (Music), Punsikorn Tiyakorn (Pun), Vathusiri Phuwapunyasiri (Korn)
- Trainee: Rinrada Inthaisong (Piam)

==== Aitakatta (อยากจะได้พบเธอ) and Oogoe Diamond(ก็ชอบให้รู้ว่าชอบ) ====
- Trainee: Cherprang Areekul, Christin Larsen (Namhom), Isarapa Thawatpakdee (Tarwaan), Jennis Oprasert, Jetsupa Kruetang (Jan), Kanteera Wadcharathadsanakul (Noey), Milin Dokthian (Namneung), Miori Ohkubo, Napaphat Worraphuttanon (Jaa), Natruja Chutiwansopon (Kaew), Nayika Srinian (Can), Patchanan Jiajirachote (Orn), **Praewa Suthamphong (Music)**, Punsikorn Tiyakorn (Pun), Sawitchaya Kajonrungsilp (Satchan), Warattaya Deesomlert (Kaimook)

==== 365nichi no Kamihikouki (365วันกับเครื่องบินกระดาษ) ====
- Trainee: Cherprang Areekul, Christin Larsen (Namhom), Isarapa Thawatpakdee (Tarwaan), **Jennis Oprasert**, Jetsupa Kruetang (Jan), Kanteera Wadcharathadsanakul (Noey), Milin Dokthian (Namneung), Miori Ohkubo, Napaphat Worraphuttanon (Jaa), Natruja Chutiwansopon (Kaew), Nayika Srinian (Can), Patchanan Jiajirachote (Orn), Praewa Suthamphong (Music), Punsikorn Tiyakorn (Pun), Sawitchaya Kajonrungsilp (Satchan), Warattaya Deesomlert (Kaimook)

==== Koi Suru Fortune Cookie (คุกกี้เสี่ยงทาย) ====
- Trainee: Cherprang Areekul, Isarapa Thawatpakdee (Tarwaan), Jennis Oprasert, Jetsupa Kruetang (Jan), Jiradapa Intajak (Pupe), Kanteera Wadcharathadsanakul (Noey), Milin Dokthian (Namneung), Miori Ohkubo, Natruja Chutiwansopon (Kaew), Patchanan Jiajirachote (Orn), **Pimrapat Phadungwatanachok (Mobile)**, Praewa Suthamphong (Music), Punsikorn Tiyakorn (Pun), Sawitchaya Kajonrungsilp (Satchan), Warattaya Deesomlert (Kaimook)
- Team Kaigai: Izuta Rina

==== BNK48 (Bangkok 48) ====
- Trainee: **Cherprang Areekul**, Isarapa Thawatpakdee (Tarwaan), Jennis Oprasert, Jetsupa Kruetang (Jan), Jiradapa Intajak (Pupe), Kanteera Wadcharathadsanakul (Noey), Milin Dokthian (Namneung), Miori Ohkubo, Natruja Chutiwansopon (Kaew), Patchanan Jiajirachote (Orn), Pimrapat Phadungwatanachok (Mobile), Praewa Suthamphong (Music), Punsikorn Tiyakorn (Pun), Sawitchaya Kajonrungsilp (Satchan), Warattaya Deesomlert (Kaimook)
- Team Kaigai: Izuta Rina

==== Skirt, Hirari (พลิ้ว) ====
- Trainee: Korapat Nilprapa (Kate), Kunjiranut Intarasin (Jane), Mananya Kaoju (Nink), **Napaphat Worraphuttanon (Jaa), Panisa Srilaloeng (Mind)**, Pichayapa Natha (Namsai), Suchaya Saenkhot (Jib)

==== Shonichi (วันแรก) ====
- Team BIII: Cherprang Areekul, Isarapa Thawatpakdee (Tarwaan), Jennis Oprasert, Jiradapa Intajak (Pupe), **Kanteera Wadcharathadsanakul (Noey)**, Kunjiranut Intarasin (Jane), Milin Dokthian (Namneung), Napaphat Worraphuttanon (Jaa), Natruja Chutiwansopon (Kaew), Patchanan Jiajirachote (Orn), Pimrapat Phadungwatanachok (Mobile), **Praewa Suthamphong (Music)**, Punsikorn Tiyakorn (Pun), Sawitchaya Kajonrungsilp (Satchan), Vathusiri Phuwapunyasiri (Korn), Warattaya Deesomlert (Kaimook)

==== Sakura no Hanabiratachi (ความทรงจำและคำอำลา) ====
- Team BIII: Cherprang Areekul, Isarapa Thawatpakdee (Tarwaan), Jennis Oprasert, Jiradapa Intajak (Pupe), Kanteera Wadcharathadsanakul (Noey), Kunjiranut Intarasin (Jane), Milin Dokthian (Namneung), Napaphat Worraphuttanon (Jaa), Natruja Chutiwansopon (Kaew), Patchanan Jiajirachote (Orn), Pimrapat Phadungwatanachok (Mobile), Praewa Suthamphong (Music), Punsikorn Tiyakorn (Pun), Sawitchaya Kajonrungsilp (Satchan), Vathusiri Phuwapunyasiri (Korn), Warattaya Deesomlert (Kaimook)

==== Namida Surprise! (ประกายน้ำตาและรอยยิ้ม) ====
- Team BIII: Cherprang Areekul, **Isarapa Thawatpakdee (Tarwaan)**, Jennis Oprasert, Kanteera Wadcharathadsanakul (Noey), Korapat Nilprapa (Kate), Miori Ohkubo, Nayika Srinian (Can), Patchanan Jiajirachote (Orn), Pichayapa Natha (Namsai), Pimrapat Phadungwatanachok (Mobile), Praewa Suthamphong (Music), Punsikorn Tiyakorn (Pun), Rina Izuta, Vathusiri Phuwapunyasiri (Korn)
- Trainee: Mananya Kaoju (Nink), Rinrada Inthaisong (Piam)

==== Anata to Christmas Eve (คำสัญญาแห่งคริสต์มาสอีฟ) ====
- Team BIII: Jetsupa Kruetang (Jan), Natruja Chutiwansopon (Kaew)

== MNL48 version ==
"River"

Single by MNL48
- Released: 27 November 2020
- Genre: P-Pop; J-pop
- Length: 28:06
- Label: Star Music
- Producers: Yasushi Akimoto; Yasunari Okada; Paulo Kurusawa

MNL48 singles chronology
"High Tension" (2019)	"River" (2020)	"No Way Man" (2022)

Music video
- "River" on YouTube

The Filipino idol group MNL48, a sister group of AKB48, covered the song with the same title. It is their sixth single released on November 27, 2020. This single includes the voting ballots for MNL48 3rd General Election.

=== Tracklisting ===
- **Bold** indicates centers.

No.	Title	Performers	Length
1.	"River"	Team MII: Alice Margarita De Leon, Cristine Jan Elaurza, Guinevere Faith Muse, Lorelaine Sañosa, Maria Jamie Beatrice Alberto, Shekinah Arzaga; Team NIV: **Abelaine Trinidad**, Aubrey Binuya, Aubrey Ysabelle Delos Reyes, Coleen Trinidad, Jennifer Nandy Villaruel; Team L: Amanda Isidto, Ella Mae Amat, Francese Therese Pinlac, **Gabrielle Skribikin**, Marsela Mari Guia	4:43
2.	"Sampung Taon ng Sakura ("Tean Years of Sakura")"	Team MII: Ashley Nicole Somera, Dana Leanne Brual, Dana Yzabel Divinagracia, Klaire Presno, Princess Rius Briquillo, Sandee Garcia; Team NIV: Alyssa Nicole Garcia, **Jemimah Caldejon**, Lara Mae Layar, Miho Hoshino, Ruther Marie Lingat; Team L: Althea Itona, Christine Ann Coloso, Dian Marie Mercado, Kaede Ishiyama, Mary Grace Buenaventura	4:15
3.	"Labrador Retriever"	Team MII: Alice Margarita De Leon, Ashley Nicole Somera, Cristine Jan Elaurza, Dana Leanne Brual, Dana Yzabel Divinagracia, Erica Maria Macabutas, Faith Shanrae Santiago, Francinne Rifol, Guinevere Faith Muse, Klaire Presno, Lorelaine Sañosa, Maria Jamie Beatrice Alberto, Princess Rius Briquillo, Sandee Garcia, Shaira Duran, **Shekinah Arzaga**	4:52
4.	"River" (Off Vocal Version)		4:43
5.	"Sampung Taon ng Sakura" (Off Vocal Version)		4:15
6.	"Labrador Retriever" (Off Vocal Version)		4:52
Total length:			28:06

== Other versions ==
- The song was redone in Mandarin by the Chinese idol group SNH48 and was included on their first single, "Heavy Rotation".
- The Vietnamese idol group SGO48 will release it this year 2020 as 3rd single, the Senbatsu members are chosen from "Senbatsu Battle"
