= Heavy Rotation (song) =

2010 single by AKB48

- Type A cover, featuring Yuko Oshima, Atsuko Maeda and Mariko Shinoda.

Single by AKB48

from the album Koko ni Ita Koto
- B-side: "Namida no Sea-Saw Game"; "Yasai Sisters"; "Lucky Seven"
- Released: August 18, 2010
- Genre: J-pop; pop rock
- Length: 4:43
- Label: You, Be Cool! / King
- Songwriters: Yasushi Akimoto, Yō Yamazaki
- Producer: Yūsuke Tanaka

AKB48 singles chronology
"Ponytail to Shushu" (2010)	"Heavy Rotation" (2010)	"Beginner" (2010)

Music videos
- "Heavy Rotation" on YouTube
- "Namida no Seesaw Game" on YouTube
- "Yasai Sisters" on YouTube
- "Lucky Seven" on YouTube

"Heavy Rotation" (ヘビーローテーション, Hebī Rōtēshon) is Japanese idol group AKB48's 17th single, released on August 18, 2010. The video was directed by photographer and movie producer Mika Ninagawa. The title song of this single, widely known as HR, was a huge karaoke hit and led the respective JOYSOUND charts for 43 weeks.

As of August 2024, the song has been covered in Indonesian by JKT48, in Mandarin by three different groups SNH48, AKB48 Team SH and AKB48 Team TP, in Tagalog by MNL48, in Vietnamese by SGO48, in Thai by BNK48, and in Malay by KLP48.

== 2010 general election ==
The group's previous single, "Ponytail to Shushu", contained tickets in which buyers would vote for a member that would participate in the title track for "Heavy Rotation". The winner of AKB48's 2010 general election was member Yuko Oshima, who became the center for the single. She was followed by Atsuko Maeda, Mariko Shinoda, Tomomi Itano and Mayu Watanabe. Oshima was the cover girl for the Type B single, while the next three ranking members in the poll were featured on the Type A cover. Before the track was recorded and the PV was filmed, the annual Kenkyuusei selection process was announced with Atsuki Ishiguro failing it because of her scandal. Hence, she is not featured in this single, nor the 40th spot was filled.

== Tie-in ==
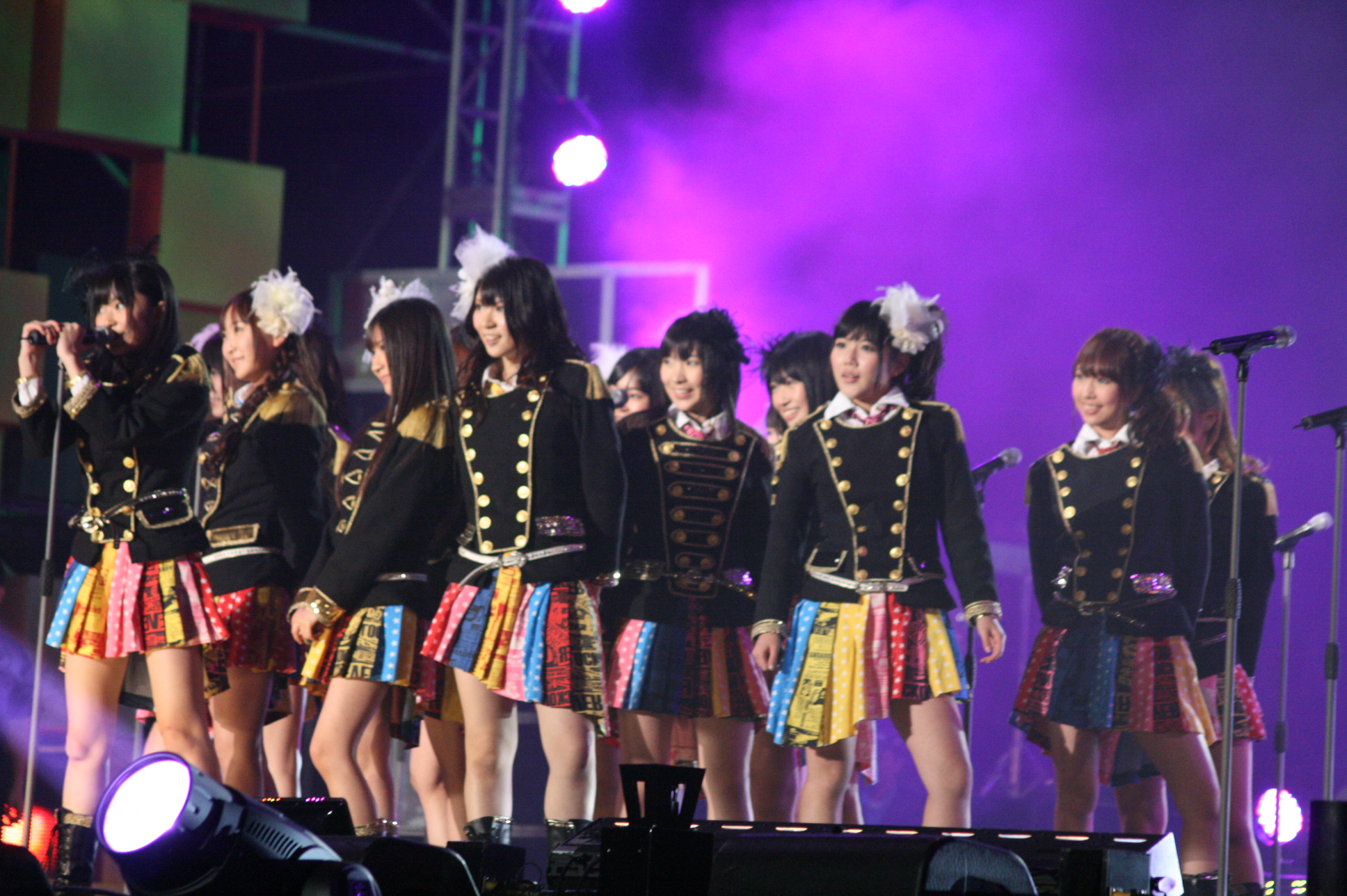
Performance at the 2010 Asia Song Festival

Three of the four songs found on the single were used in television commercial campaigns: "Heavy Rotation" in commercials for confectionist UHA Kakuto's Puccho candies, "Lucky Seven" for 7-Eleven and "Yasai Sisters" for a campaign by vegetable juice producers Kagome. "Namida no See-Saw Game" was used as the ending theme song for AKB48's variety show, AKB600sec.

== Track listing ==
Type A track list
No.	Title	Writer(s)	Arranger	Length
1.	"Heavy Rotation"	Yasushi Akimoto, Yō Yamazaki	Yūsuke Tanaka	4:41
2.	"Namida no Sea-Saw Game" (涙のシーソーゲーム "Sea-Saw Game of Tears," performed by Under Girls)	Akimoto, Toshiaki Matsumoto	Ryosuke Nakanishi	4:43
3.	"Yasai Sisters" (野菜シスターズ "Vegetable Sisters," performed by Yasai Sisters)	Akimoto, Takao Yoshino	Seiji Mutō	3:34
4.	"Heavy Rotation (Karaoke Ver.)"	Akimoto, Yamazaki	Tanaka	4:40
5.	"Namida no Sea-Saw Game (Karaoke Ver.)"	Akimoto, Matsumoto	Nakanishi	4:43
6.	"Yasai Sisters (Karaoke Ver.)"	Akimoto, Yoshino	Mutō	3:35
Total length:				26:05

Type B track list
No.	Title	Writer(s)	Arranger	Length
1.	"Heavy Rotation"	Akimoto, Yamazaki	Tanaka	4:41
2.	"Namida no Sea-Saw Game"	Akimoto, Matsumoto	Nakanishi	4:43
3.	"Lucky Seven" (ラッキーセブン Rakkī Sebun)	Akimoto, Keiji Tanabe	Yūichi "Masa" Nonaka	3:41
4.	"Heavy Rotation (Karaoke Ver.)"	Akimoto, Yamazaki	Tanaka	4:40
5.	"Namida no Sea-Saw Game (Karaoke Ver.)"	Akimoto, Matsumoto	Nakanishi	4:43
6.	"Lucky Seven (Karaoke Ver.)"	Akimoto, Tanabe	Nonaka	3:43
Total length:				26:19

Theatre version track list
No.	Title	Writer(s)	Arranger	Length
1.	"Heavy Rotation"	Akimoto, Yamazaki	Tanaka	4:41
2.	"Namida no Sea-Saw Game"	Akimoto, Matsumoto	Nakanishi	4:43
3.	"Yasai Sisters"	Akimoto, Yoshino	Mutō	3:34
4.	"Lucky Seven"	Akimoto, Tanabe	Nonaka	3:40
Total length:				16:39

== Senbatsu ==
=== Heavy Rotation ===
Center : Yuko Oshima

- Team A: Haruna Kojima #7, Atsuko Maeda #2, Haruka Nakagawa #20, Rino Sashihara #19, Mariko Shinoda #3, Minami Takahashi #6, Aki Takajō #13
- Team K: Sayaka Akimoto #17, Tomomi Itano #4, Minami Minegishi #14, Sae Miyazawa #9, Erena Ono (last single) #15, Yuko Oshima #1 (Center)
- Team B: Tomomi Kasai #12, Yuki Kashiwagi #8, Rie Kitahara #16, Miho Miyazaki #21, Amina Satō #18, Mayu Watanabe #5
- SKE48 Team S: Jurina Matsui #10, Rena Matsui #11

=== Namida no Sea-Saw Game ===
Sang by the Undergirls. The center for this song is Aika Ōta.

- Team A: Haruka Katayama, Asuka Kuramochi, Natsumi Matsubara, Aika Ōta (Center)
- Team K: Reina Fujie, Moeno Nitō, Ayaka Umeda, Rumi Yonezawa
- Team B: Natsumi Hirajima, Haruka Ishida, Mika Komori, Sumire Satō, Yuka Masuda
- Team Kenkyūsei: Haruka Shimazaki, Suzuran Yamauchi
- SKE48 team S: Masana Ōya, Kumi Yagami
- SKE48 team KII: Akane Takayanagi

=== Yasai Sisters ===
- Team A: Haruna Kojima, Asuka Kuramochi, Atsuko Maeda, Ami Maeda, Aika Ōta, Rino Sashihara, Mariko Shinoda, Minami Takahashi, Aki Takajo
- Team K: Sayaka Akimoto, Tomomi Itano, Minami Minegishi, Sae Miyazawa, Moeno Nitō, Erena Ono, Yuko Oshima
- Team B: Haruka Ishida, Tomomi Kasai, Yuki Kashiwagi, Rie Kitahara, Mika Komori, Miho Miyazaki, Sumire Satō, Mayu Watanabe
- SKE48 team S: Jurina Matsui, Rena Matsui

Ishida has only appeared on behalf of Ono in the PV.

=== Lucky Seven ===
- Team A: Misaki Iwasa, Haruna Kojima, Atsuko Maeda, Rino Sashihara, Mariko Shinoda, Minami Takahashi, Aki Takajo
- Team K: Sayaka Akimoto, Tomomi Itano, Minami Minegishi, Sae Miyazawa, Yuko Ōshima
- Team B: Tomomi Kasai, Yuki Kashiwagi, Rie Kitahara, Mika Komori, Miho Miyazaki, Mayu Watanabe

Iwasa has only appeared on behalf of Miyazaki in the PV.

== Charts and certifications ==
=== Chart performance ===
Chart	Peak position
Billboard Adult Contemporary Airplay	5
Billboard Japan Hot 100	1
Billboard yearly Japan Hot 100	3
Oricon daily singles	1
Oricon weekly singles	1
Oricon monthly singles	4
Oricon yearly singles	2
RIAJ Digital Track Chart weekly top 100	1
RIAJ Digital Track Chart yearly top 100	12

=== Sales and certifications ===
Chart	Amount
Oricon physical sales	880,761
RIAJ physical shipping certification	Triple platinum
RIAJ ringtone downloads	Triple platinum
RIAJ full-length cellphone downloads	Million
RIAJ PC downloads	Double platinum

== JKT48 version ==
"Heavy Rotation"

Song by JKT48

from the album Heavy Rotation
- Language: Indonesia
- Released: February 13, 2013
- Recorded: 2011
- Genre: Indo pop
- Length: 4:42
- Label: HITS Record, Sony Music Indonesia
- Composer: Yō Yamazaki
- Lyricists: Original Japanese lyrics: Yasushi Akimoto; Indonesia lyrics:
- Producer: Yasushi Akimoto

Music video
- "[MV] Heavy Rotation - JKT48" on YouTube

"Heavy Rotation" is a song from Indonesian-Japanese female idol group JKT48. It was a cover from the original in Japanese that sung by AKB48 in 2010. The song was performed first in commercial television performance on 2011 ahead of the group main debut. Heavy Rotation originally performed by 16 members. Later, the song was released as studio album in 2013 which also the group first-ever discographies and released in two physical version.

The song features member Melody Nuramdhani Laksani as choreographic performances center. "Heavy Rotation" is also included in the group's fifth main single, "Flying Get" in 2014. Music video from the song released in 2020 or eight years after its debut performance.

=== Personnel ===
"Heavy Rotation" was sung by selection senbatsu performer, consist of: Melody Nurramdhani Laksani, Ayana Shahab, Beby Chaesara Anadila, Cindy Gulla, Devi Kinal Putri, Frieska Anastasia Laksani, Ghaida Farisya, Jessica Vania, Jessica Veranda, Nabilah Ratna Ayu Azalia, Rena Nozawa, Rezky Wiranti Dhike, Sendy Ariani, Shania Junianatha, Sonya Pandarmawan, Stella Cornelia.

== SNH48 version ==
"Heavy Rotation"
- Blue Version cover

Single by SNH48
- B-side: "River"; "Let's Become Cherry Blossom Trees"
- Released: June 13, 2013
- Genre: Pop rock
- Length: 4:47
- Label: Ocean Butterflies Music
- Songwriters: Original Japanese lyrics: Yasushi Akimoto; Chinese lyrics: Gu Rui; Gou Qing; Composer: Yō Yamazaki; Yoshimasa Inoue; Yoko Kensuke
- Producer: Yasushi Akimoto

SNH48 singles chronology
"Heavy Rotation" (2013)	"Flying Get" (2013)

Red version

Music videos
- "Heavy Rotation"

Music video
- "River"

Music video
- "Let's Become Cherry Blossom Trees"

"Heavy Rotation" (Chinese: 无尽旋转; pinyin: Wújìn Xuánzhuǎn) was redone in Mandarin for AKB48's sister group in China, SNH48, as the group's debut single; it was released on June 13, 2013. This EP also contains Mandarin tracks for River and Sakura no Ki ni Narō.

=== Release ===
The single was released in two versions: Type Red and Type Blue. The contents in Type Red and Type Blue were the same except their different cover photo. Each CD includes a handshake event ticket, a member photo, a group photo, and a DVD with the music videos of the three songs.

A Collector's Edition was released after the initial two versions were sold out, and was also released in Type Red and Type Blue. Each CD included a River theme photo with 16 members, but did not include a DVD.

=== Track listing ===
Track list
No.	Title	Writer(s)	Arranger	Length
1.	"Heavy Rotation" (Chinese: 无尽旋转, Pinyin: Wújìn Xuánzhuǎn)	Gu Rui, Gou Qing (Chinese lyrics); Yō Yamazaki (Composer)	Yūsuke Tanaka	4:47
2.	"River" (Chinese: 激流之战, Pinyin: Jīliú Zhī Zhàn)	Gu Rui, Gou Qing (Chinese lyrics); Yoshimasa Inoue (Composer)	Yoshimasa Inoue	4:48
3.	"Let's Become Cherry Blossom Trees" (Chinese: 化作樱花树, Pinyin: Huà Zuò Yīnghuā Shù)	Gu Rui, Gou Qing (Chinese lyrics); Yoko Kensuke (Composer)	Yūichi "Masa" Nonaka	5:34
4.	"Heavy Rotation (off vocal ver.)"	Yō Yamazaki (Composer)	Yūsuke Tanaka	4:47
5.	"River (off vocal ver.)"	Yoshimasa Inoue (Composer)	Yoshimasa Inoue	4:48
6.	"Let's Become Cherry Blossom Trees (off vocal ver.)"	Yoko Kensuke (Composer)	Yūichi "Masa" Nonaka	5:34
Total length:				30:15

=== Personnel ===
The track was sung by the first generation members of SNH48:

- Wu Zhehan, Gu Xiangjun, Kong Xiaoyin, Jiang Yuxi, Xu Jiaqi, Xu Chenchen, Dai Meng, Tang Min, Qiu Xinyi, Chen Guanhui, Chen Si, Qian Beiting, Zhao Jiamin, Zhang Yuge, Ding Ziyan, Dong Zhiyi, Mo Han, Li Yuqi

== AKB48 Team SH version ==
"Heavy Rotation"
- Type A CD version cover

Song by AKB48 Team SH

from the album 365nichi no Sustainable
- Language: Mandarin
- Released: January 18, 2019
- Recorded: 2018
- Genre: C-pop
- Length: 4:41
- Label: Shanghai Shangyue Culture Development Co., Ltd.
- Composer: Yō Yamazaki
- Lyricists: Original Japanese lyrics: Yasushi Akimoto; Chinese lyrics:
- Producer: Yasushi Akimoto

"Heavy Rotation" originally was a song by Japanese idol group AKB48 then later covered by its sister group into respective languages. The Mandarin version of "Heavy Rotation" was done by SNH48 on 2013, then later covered by AKB48 Team SH with different lyrics. Lyric that used by AKB48 Team SH also used by AKB48 Team TP. This song is included in AKB48 Team SH debut EP "Shonichi".

The song features member Liu Nian and Zhai Yujia as choreographic performances center.

=== Personnel ===
"Heavy Rotation" was sung by selection senbatsu performer, consist of: Dong FangChi, Li ShiQi, Liu Nian, Mao WeiJia, Shen Ying, Shi KeYan, Wan FangZhou, Wang YuDuo, Wei Xin, Wu AnQi, Xu YiTing, Ye ZhiEn, Zhai YuJia, Zhou NianQi, Zhu Ling, Zhuang XiaoTi.

== SGO48 version ==
"Heavy Rotation"

Single by SGO48
- Language: Vietnamese
- B-side: "Shonichi"; "Aitakatta"; "SGO48"
- Released: August 25, 2019
- Recorded: 2019
- Genre: Pop rock
- Length: 4:45
- Label: YAG Entertainment
- Songwriters: Original Japanese lyrics: Yasushi Akimoto; Vietnamese lyrics: Huy Tuan
- Producer: Yasushi Akimoto

SGO48 singles chronology
"Heavy Rotation" (2019)	"Koisure Fortune Cookie" (2020)

Music video
- "【OFFICIAL MV】HEAVY ROTATION / SGO48" on YouTube

Following the group's debut on December 22, 2018, "Heavy Rotation" was adapted in Vietnamese by SGO48, later released as the group's first single in the country on August 25, 2019. The release also contains Vietnamese version of "Shonichi", "Aitakatta," and "SGO48", having previously performed all three songs during their debut concert in December 2018. It was released in three different physical versions, containing a collectible digital card, a random bonus photo, a lyric book, and a handshake ticket. The accompanying music video was later premiered through their official YouTube channel on August 1, 2019, three weeks prior to the physical release.

To promote the single, SGO48 released a special documentary series on practicing for their first single, titled Light Up Your Dream from July 26, 2019. The group went on to appear on several native television programs and events to perform all the songs live, and later as part of their setlist during the group's participation at the AKB48 Group Asia Festival in Shanghai on August 24, 2019.

=== Track listing ===
No.	Title	Lyrics	Music	Arrangement	Length
1.	"Heavy Rotation"	Yasushi Akimoto, Huy Tuấn (adaptation)	Yō Yamazaki	Yūsuke Tanaka	4:45
2.	"Shonichi" (Ngày đầu tiên)	Akimoto, Nguyễn Văn Chung (adaptation)	Mio Okada	Yuichi Ichikawa	3:51
3.	"Aitakatta" (Lời từ lòng tôi)	Akimoto, Huy Tuấn (adaptation)	BOUNCEBACK	Tomonori Taguchi; Haruo Inatome	3:53
4.	"SGO48" (Saigon 48)	Akimoto, Huy Tuấn (adaptation)	Miki Watanabe	Yasuharu Takanashi	4:03
Total length:					16:32

=== Personnel ===
"Heavy Rotation"

Performed by sixteen pre-selected senbatsu performers, with member Trần Cát Tường (Anna) serving as the center for "Heavy Rotation". Other senbatsu members include: Châu Ngọc Đoan Thảo (Hikari), Đặng Thị Huỳnh Như (Minxy), Huỳnh Ngô Kim Châu (Mon), Lê Phạm Thuỷ Tiên (Tiên Linh), Lê Sunny, Lê Thị Thu Nga, Nguyễn Hồ Trùng Dương, Nguyễn Lê Ngọc Ánh Sáng, Nguyễn Quế Minh Hân (Sachi), Nguyễn Thị Lệ (Lệ Trang), Nguyễn Thanh Hoàng My (Mochi), Nguyễn Trương Tường Vy (Janie), Phạm Lâm Ánh Trúc (Trúc Phạm), Võ Phan Kim Khánh (Kaycee), and Vương Mai Linh (Linh Mai).

"Shonichi"

Performed by fourteen senbatsu members from above, with the exception of Thu Nga and Minxy. Two other Under Girls members, namely Nguyễn Thị Nhi (Dona), and Lê Mẫn Nghi, participated in recording the song.

"Aitakatta"

Performed by fifteen senbatsu members from above, with the exception of Mon and the appearance of Dona instead.

"SGO48"

Performed by all twenty-eight members of SGO48.

== BNK48 version ==
"Heavy Rotation"

Single by BNK48

from the album Warota People
- B-side: "Hashire! Penguin"; "Wink wa Sankai"
- Released: July 29, 2020
- Genre: Thai Pop
- Label: iAM
- Songwriters: Original Japanese lyrics: Yasushi Akimoto; Thai lyrics: Pongchuk Pissathanporn; Tanupop Notayanont; Prapop Chomthaworn; Krittikorn Pornsatit; Composer: Yō Yamazaki
- Producer: Yasushi Akimoto

BNK48 singles chronology
"High Tension" (2020)	"Heavy Rotation" (2020)	"D.AAA" (2021)

Music videos
- "【MV Full】Heavy Rotation / BNK48" on YouTube
- "【MV Full】Hashire! Penguin - วิ่งไปสิ...เพนกวิน / BNK48" on YouTube

"Heavy Rotation" has been redone in Thai by sister group BNK48 in July 2020 as their ninth single. This single personnel were chosen by their second edition of Senbatsu General Election. The first performance from main song also the announcement about this single B-Side was announced at BNK48 Wonderland event on July, 26.

On January 27, 2019, during the performance of "AKB48 Group Asia Festival in Bangkok" a snippet of Thai version from this song has been performed for the very first time by WRD48 unit that consist of members from AKB48, JKT48, MNL48, AKB48 Team SH, AKB48 Team TP, and SGO48. The song has been sung in medley by the group's local respective languages. Members who sing the medley in Thai were Cherprang Areekul, Praewa Suthamphong (Music), and Punsikorn Tiyakorn (Pun).

=== Track listing ===
No.	Title	Lyrics	Music	Arrangement	Length
1.	"Heavy Rotation" (A cover of AKB48's "Heavy Rotation")	Yasushi Akimoto; Pongchuk Pissathanporn; Tanupop Notayanont	Yō Yamazaki	Yūsuke Tanaka	4:42
2.	"วิ่งไปสิ...เพนกวิน (Hashire! Penguin)" (A cover of AKB48's "Hashire! Penguin")	Yasushi Akimoto; Prapop Chomthaworn	Tetsuro Oda	Nonaka "Masa" Yūichi	3:59
3.	"วิ้งค์ 3 ครั้ง (Wink wa Sankai)" (A cover of HKT48's "Wink wa Sankai")	Yasushi Akimoto; Krittikorn Pornsatit	truly truth	Nonaka "Masa" Yūichi	4:13
4.	"Heavy Rotation" (Off Vocal Ver.)		Yō Yamazaki	Yūsuke Tanaka	4:42
5.	"Hashire! Penguin" (Off Vocal Ver.)		Tetsuro Oda	Nonaka "Masa" Yūichi	3:59
6.	"Wink wa Sankai" (Off Vocal ver.)		truly truth	Nonaka "Masa" Yūichi	4:13
Total length:					25:48

=== Personnel ===
"Heavy Rotation"

"Heavy Rotation" was performed by 16 chosen senbatsu performer that determined by ranking from their Senbatsu General Election placement, which consist of: Kunjiranut Intarasin (Jane) (center), Cherprang Areekul, Jennis Oprasert, Kanteera Wadcharathadsanakul (Noey), Natruja Chutiwansopon (Kaew), Plearnpichaya Komalarajun (Juné), Punsikorn Tiyakorn (Pun), Rachaya Tupkunanon (Minmin), Weeraya Zhang (Wee), Isarapa Thawatpakdee (Tarwaan), Jiradapa Intajak (Pupe), Milin Dokthian (Namneung), Natticha Chantaravareelekha (Fond), Patchanan Jiajirachote (Orn), Pimrapat Phadungwatanachok (Mobile), Praewa Suthamphong (Music).

"Hashire! Penguin - วิ่งไปสิ...เพนกวิน"

"Hashire! Penguin" (lit. Run! Penguin) was performed by 16 chosen Undergirls performer that determined by ranking from their Senbatsu General Election placement, which consist of:

- BNK48: Warattaya Deesomlert (Kaimook) (center), Miori Ohkubo, Suchaya Saenkhot (Jib), Vathusiri Phuwapunyasiri (Korn), Chanyapuk Numprasop (New), Janista Tansiri (Bamboo), Nannaphas Loetnamchoetsakun (Mewnich), Nuttakul Pimtongchaikul (Gygee), Sawitchaya Kajonrungsilp (Satchan), Sirikarn Shinnawatsuwan (Phukkhom), Tarisa Preechatangkit (Stang).
- CGM48: Rina Izuta, Punyawee Jungcharoen (Aom), Pronwarin Wongtrakulkit (Pim).

"Wink wa Sankai - วิ้งค์ 3 ครั้ง"

"Wink wa Sankai" (lit. Wink 3 times) originally by HKT48 and covered in Thai by 16 chosen Next Girls performer that determined by ranking from their Senbatsu General Election placement, which consist of:

- BNK48: Napaphat Worraphuttanon (Jaa) (center), Jidarpha Chamchooy (Panda), Juthamas Khonta (Kheng), Khawisara Singplod (Myyu), Sumitra Duangkaew (Faii), Warinrat Yolprasong (Niky), Phattharanarin Mueanarit (Nine), Pichayapa Natha (Namsai), Kamonthida Rotthawinithi (View), Manipa Roopanya (Khamin), Pakwan Noijaiboon.
- CGM48: Manichar Aimdilokwong (Marmink), Manita Chanchai (Kaiwan), Pundita Koontawee (Fortune), Sita Teeradechsakul, Vithita Srasreesom (Kaning).

== See also ==
- List of best-selling singles in Japan
