= Punyawee Jungcharoen =

Thai singer (born 1995)

Punyawee Jungcharoen ปุณยวีร์ จึงเจริญ
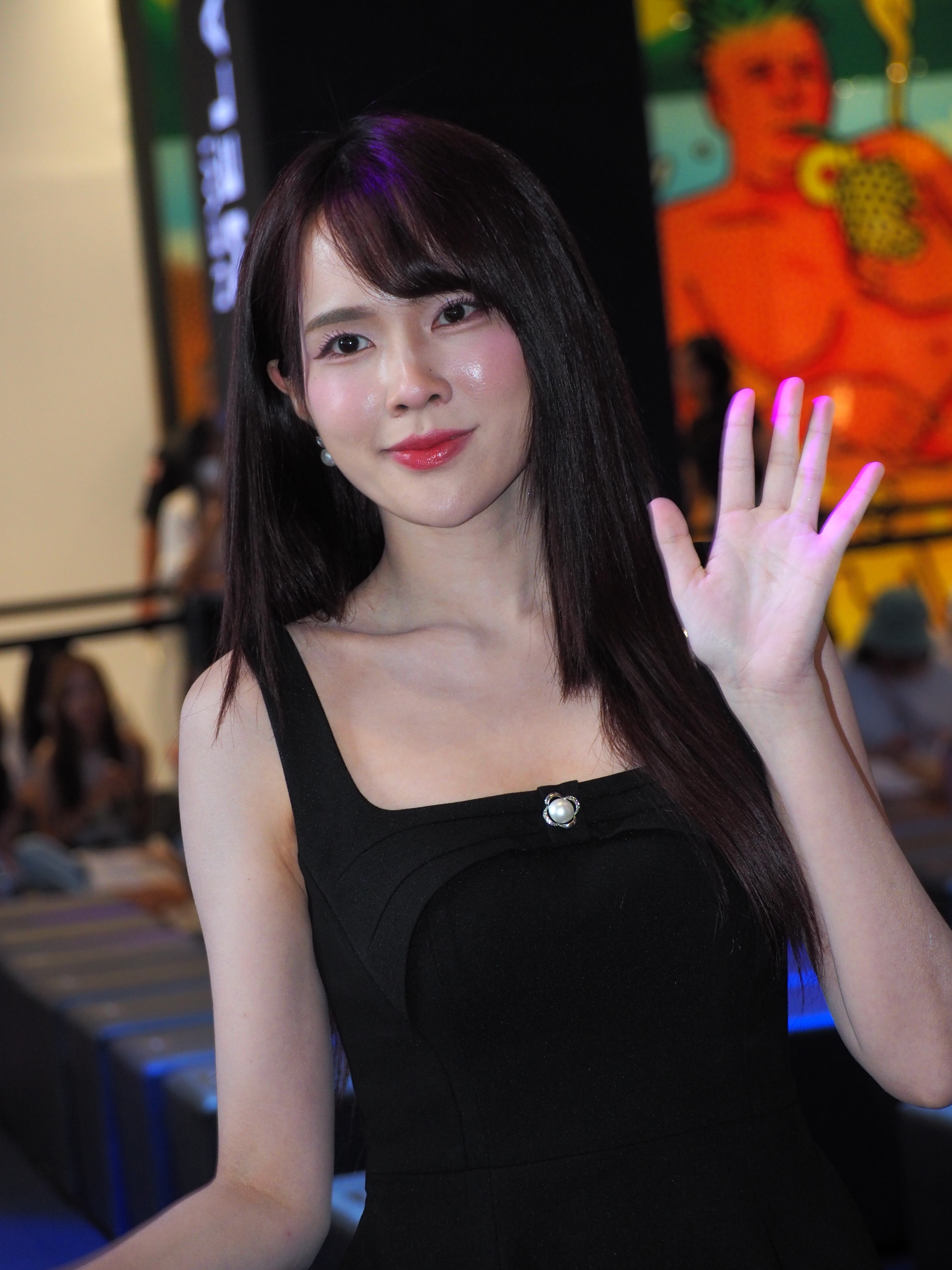
- Aom in 2024

Background information
- Also known as: Aom (ออม)
- Born: 20 September 1995 (age 31); Chiang Mai, Thailand
- Genres: Thai pop; J-pop
- Occupation: Singer
- Years active: 2018–present
- Label: iAM
- Member of: CGM48
- Formerly of: BNK48

Punyawee Jungcharoen (Thai: ปุณยวีร์ จึงเจริญ, IPA: [pun.já.wiː t͡ɕɯŋ.t͡ɕà.rɤːn]; born 20 September 1995), or nickname Aom (ออม, IPA: [ʔɔːm]), is a former member of the Thai idol girl group CGM48, an international sister group of the Japanese idol girl group AKB48, where she was the captain of the group and concurrently a member of CGM48's Team C. Previously, she was one of the second generation members of BNK48.

== Early life ==
Aom was born in Chiang Mai Province. She graduated from the Faculty of Science (Insurance Actuarial Science and Risk Management : ACT) of Thammasat University.

== Career ==
On April 29, 2018, Aom passed BNK48's second-generation auditions. Her debut stage performance was on May 11, 2018, at BNK48's Trainee Stage. Thoe Khue Melodi was the single where Aom was selected to sing the title track for the first time.

On June 10, 2019, it was announced Aom would transfer to CGM48 with Rina Izuta and she will be the group's captain. Her last BNK48's stage was on August 28, 2019. She started activities as a CGM48 member in October 2019.

On February 9, 2020, Aom got promoted to an official member belonging to Team C and she was part of CGM48's debut single "Chiang Mai 106".

In BNK48 9th Single Senbatsu General Election, Aom placed 25th with 4,942 votes. It was her first ever ranking.

On February 13, 2024, Aom announced her graduation from the group.

== Discography ==
=== CGM48 singles ===
Year	No.	Title	Role	Notes
2020	1	"Chiang Mai 106"	A-side	Also Sang on "Valentine Chok Dee" and "CGM48 (Chiang Mai 48)"
2020	2	"Melon Juice"	A-side	Also Sang on "Phuea Khai Sak Khon"
2021	3	"Mali"	A-side	Also Sang on "Chain of love" and "Baan Haeng Hua Jai"
2022	4	"Sud Senthang"	A-side	Also Sang on "Rot Fai Sai Rung"
2022	5	"2565"	A-side	Also Sang on "Only Today" and "Kimi wa Boku da" (Solo Song)

=== CGM48 Albums ===
Year	No.	Title	Participated song
2022	1	Phuk Phan Ni Ran	"Phuk Phan Ni Ran"; "Mali" (Special Version)

=== BNK48 singles ===
Year	No.	Title	Role	Notes
2018	4	"Thoe Khue Melodi"	A-side	First BNK48 A-side
2020	9	"Heavy Rotation"	B-side	Ranked 25th in 2020 BNK48's General Election. Participated from CGM48 Team C, Sang on "Wing Pai Si...Penguin"
2022	11	"Sayonara Crawl"	A-side	
2022	12	"Believers"	A-side	Ranked 16th in 2022 BNK48's General Election

=== Other singles ===
Year	Title	Notes
2020	"Touch by Heart"	The song was released in order to support people suffering from COVID-19.
2020	"Touch by Heart (Lanna version)"	The song was released in order to support people suffering from COVID-19.
2020	"Touch by Heart (Special version)"	The song was released in order to support people suffering from COVID-19.
2021	"Let's go all the way" (Pai Tor)	The title song for the movie Hao Peng Jah Yah Gang Nong.
2021	"Swasdi Pi Mai"	The song for celebrating the 2022's New Year.

=== Series ===
- XYZ - Mind (2021)
- Triage - Mai (2022)

=== Movie ===
- BNK48: One Take - Herself (2020)
- Hao Peng Jah Yah Gang Nong - Herself (2021)
- My Boo (2024) - Soda

=== Television ===
- Victory BNK48 (2018)
