= SGO48 =

Vietnamese girl group

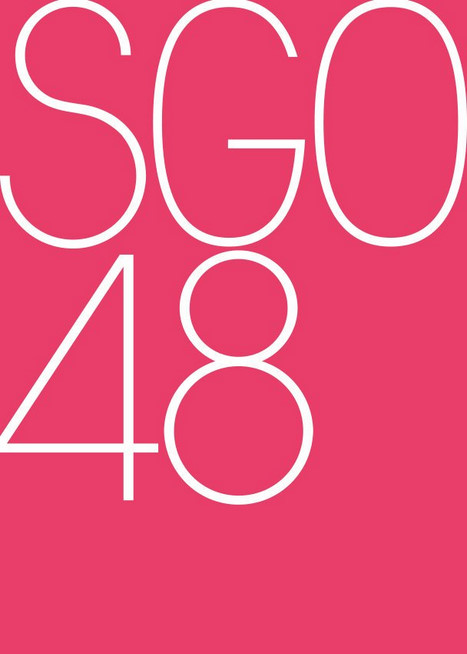

Background information
- Also known as: Saigon 48
- Origin: Ho Chi Minh City, Vietnam
- Genres: V-pop
- Years active: 2018–2021
- Label: YAG Entertainment
- Spinoff of: AKB48 Group
- Members: 1st generation
- Past members: See more...
- Website: SGO48.com

SGO48 (short for Saigon 48, read S.G.O. Forty-Eight) was a Vietnamese idol girl group based in Ho Chi Minh City, Vietnam, the seventh international sister group of AKB48 (after Indonesia's JKT48, China's SNH48 (former), Thailand's BNK48, the Philippines' MNL48, China's TSH48, and Taiwan's TPE48). The group debuted on December 22, 2018 and disbanded on their third anniversary, December 22, 2021.

Originally consisting of 29 first-generation members, SGO48 had 20 as of April 2021, thus becoming the Vietnamese girl group with the most members.

== History ==
=== 2018–2019: formation, recruitment and debut ===
On June 21, 2018, AKS Co. announced the formation of SGO48 through a joint venture between CTCP Tập đoàn Yeah1 (Yeah1 Group) (YEG) and Geo Brain Corporation, and formed the YAG Entertainment company. After the recruitment announcement on August 3 by both the AKB48 and YAG Entertainment team, audition process for the group's first generation on August 10, 2018, consisted of three separate rounds: online registration, interview, and lastly, final round. A concept for a SGO48 theater was brought up to conversation during the first livestream meeting with Japanese investors. Within the first round, candidates had to apply online on the company's website by filling out personal information, with more than 8,000 applications sent and of whom 350 candidates were selected to advance to the interview round. The candidates then performed and answered questions from the judges on the interview round, where 120 candidates were chosen to proceed to the final round. They then had their own talent performance for the training and selection round, where the judges would proceed to select the final members to officially join the group. The label then announced the 29 official members for the first generation of SGO48 on November 17, 2018, followed by their first live performance with AKB48's Team 8 a day after in Vietnam's capital Hanoi as part of the "Kizuna Ekiden 2018" event.

Following the withdrawal of BunnyV on December 13, SGO48 officially debuted on December 22, 2018, through their Dream Performance concert at Crescent Mall, where the group performed a total of four Vietnamese-adapted AKB48 songs, including “Shonichi”, “Aitakatta”, “Shoujotachi Yo”, and “SGO48”. Over 1,500 fans attended the concert, exceeding expectations for the newly formed idol group. Shortly after, the group then had their first international performance at the 2019 Asia Festival, presented by SHANDA GAMES, in Bangkok, Thailand, on January 27, 2019.

=== 2019–2020: line-up changes, first releases and Senbatsu Battle ===
With member Yuumi graduating May 31, 2019, YAG Entertainment announced that SGO48 would release their first single on July 17, 2019, revealing the title to be “Heavy Rotation”. The accompanying music video was later premiered through their official YouTube channel on August 1, 2019, followed by several appearances on their native television programs and events to perform the song live, as well as the group's first reality program Pinker School. On August 19, member Kaycee was announced as the group's first captain at their Hanoi meeting. The group then joined their sister groups at the AKB48 Group Asia Festival in Shanghai on August 24, 2019, where they co-performed “Heavy Rotation”, “Namida Surprise!”, “Kokoro No Placard” in Japanese, “Ponytail to Shushu”, and “365 Nichi no Kamihikouki”. SGO48 then announced their second single to be "Koisuru Fortune Cookie" on December 7, 2019, at the group's Koisuru Xmas Party mini show, where their native label announced the upcoming plan to recruit the second generation for the group. An accompanying music video for the song was premiered during the event, and later released on December 12, 2019. Member Anna then attended the 70th Kōhaku Uta Gassen on December 31, 2019, becoming the first Vietnamese idol member to join the other 48 sister groups for performance.

Following the dismissal of member Sachi on May 24, 2020, as well as the graduation of member Elena and Celia two days later, YAG Ent. announced the premiere of Senbatsu Battle, the group's second reality program on June 8, 2020, focusing on the members' practice process to select the final sixteen members - known as the regular senbatsu line-up for their upcoming third single.

On 22 August 2020, Captain Kaycee told on Kenh14 that there would be an MV featuring 23 members. This is the first time for the first generation to appear fully as a way to thank fans for supporting them since debut. YAG later teased a poster for their MV, Shonichi (Ngày Đầu Tiên - The first day), which is a B-side from the first single, "Heavy Rotation". On 18 September 2020, the MV is released on SGO48's YouTube Channel.

=== 2021: original song and disbandment ===
On April 4, 2021, YAG Entertainment, at the handshake event of single RIVER , announced the 7 members with the highest number of tickets: Anh Sang (750 tickets), Hikari (648 tickets), Mochi (641 tickets), Le Trang (536 tickets), Janie (507 tickets), Ashley (486 tickets) and Trung Duong (468 tickets), and these members will join the group's first original song, which will be released in May. YAG Entertainment also announced their next single to be released in August. The Senbatsu will comprise 7 members who have the largest number of pre-order singles, including first and second generation members. On December 5, 2021, it was announced they will disband after their 3rd anniversary on December 22, 2021, due to the COVID-19 pandemic.

== Members ==
=== Final roster ===
Originally debuting with 29 first-generation members on December 22, 2018, the group had a 20-member roster as of April 11, 2021, captained by Kaycee since August 19, 2019.

Stage name	Birth name	Date of birth (age)	Place of birth
Ánh Sáng	Nguyễn Lê Ngọc Ánh Sáng	January 13, 2006 (age 20)	Ho Chi Minh City
Anna	Trần Cát Tường	September 24, 2000 (age 25)	Bình Dương
Ashley	Trần Lý Minh Thư	May 23, 2000 (age 25)	Ho Chi Minh City
DONA	Nguyễn Thị Nhi	August 10, 2000 (age 25)	Đắk Lắk
Hikari	Châu Ngọc Đoan Thảo	July 11, 1998 (age 27)	Ho Chi Minh City
Janie	Nguyễn Trương Tường Vy	January 3, 2002 (age 24)	Ho Chi Minh City
Kaycee	Võ Phan Kim Khánh	October 18, 1997 (age 28)	Vĩnh Long
Lệ Trang	Nguyễn Thị Lệ	October 13, 2001 (age 24)	Bắc Ninh
Linh Mai	Vương Mai Linh	May 1, 1997 (age 28)	Nghệ An
Mẫn Nghi	Lê Mẫn Nghi	November 25, 2005 (age 20)	An Giang
Mochi	Nguyễn Thanh Hoàng My	May 9, 2004 (age 21)	Lâm Đồng
Mon	Huỳnh Ngô Kim Châu	February 2, 2001 (age 25)	Ho Chi Minh City
Nini	Ngô Thị Cẩm Nhi	August 12, 2000 (age 25)	Hậu Giang
Sunny	Lê Sunny	October 30, 2003 (age 22)	Ho Chi Minh City
Tammy	Nguyễn Thị Minh Thư	November 12, 2003 (age 22)	Đồng Nai
Thu Nga	Lê Thị Thu Nga	December 25, 2003 (age 22)	Ho Chi Minh City
Tiên Linh	Lê Phạm Thủy Tiên	April 24, 1998 (age 27)	Bình Thuận
Trúc Phạm	Phạm Lâm Ánh Trúc	September 4, 1997 (age 28)	Ho Chi Minh City
Trùng Dương	Nguyễn Hồ Trùng Dương	December 3, 1999 (age 26)	Bình Dương
Xuân Ca	Võ Ngọc Xuân Ca	September 20, 2001 (age 24)	Bình Thuận

=== Former members ===
Stage name	Birth name	Date of birth (age)	Place of birth	Graduation date	Note
BunnyV	Trần Nguyễn Phương Vy	June 28, 1997 (age 28)	Ho Chi Minh City	Dec 18, 2018	Withdrew for personal reasons.
Yuumi	Yuumi Koseki (小関優実)	August 30, 2004 (age 21)	Japan	May 31, 2019	Graduated to continue her studies in Japan.
Gia Nghi	Thái Gia Nghi	December 6, 2004 (age 21)	Ho Chi Minh City	Dec 7, 2019	Graduated to focus on studies.
Sachi	Nguyễn Quế Minh Hân	June 25, 2003 (age 22)	Ho Chi Minh City	May 26, 2020	Removed from the group due to secret dating.
Elena	Nguyễn Lê Thùy Ngọc	February 22, 1999 (age 27)	Đồng Nai	May 28, 2020	Graduated due to health reasons.
Celia	Nguyễn Thị Thúy Nga	August 25, 2002 (age 23)	Ho Chi Minh City	May 28, 2020	Graduated to focus on studies.
Như Thảo	Lê Nguyễn Như Thảo	May 15, 2000 (age 25)	Cần Thơ	April 11, 2021	Graduated for personal reasons.
Minxy	Đặng Thị Huỳnh Như	September 16, 1999 (age 26)	Tây Ninh	April 11, 2021	Graduated for personal reasons.
Phụng Nhi	Lê Nguyễn Phụng Nhi	October 23, 2004 (age 21)	Long An	April 11, 2021	Graduated for personal reasons.

== Discography ==
=== Singles ===
Year	Name	Date of release
2019	Heavy Rotation	August 25, 2019
2019	Koisuru Fortune Cookie - Thất Tình Tích Cực	December 12, 2019
2020	RIVER	December 20, 2020

=== Music videos ===
Year	Title	Director	Ref.
2019	Heavy Rotation	Kim Sin Wook	
2019	Koisuru Fortune Cookie (Thất Tình Tích Cực)	Vo Thanh Hoa, Do Vu	
2020	Shonichi (Ngày Đầu Tiên)	To Buu Phat	
2020	RIVER	Khuong Vu	

== Filmography ==
=== TV shows ===
Year	Name	Channel	No. of episodes	Members	Date	Note
2018	Giọng ải giọng ai (Hidden Singer Vietnam)	HTV7	1 (E14)	Tiên Linh	February 3	Contestant
2019	Bí mật chuyện sao (Star Secret)	HTV9	1	Ánh Sáng, Kaycee, Linh Mai, Lệ Trang, Sachi, Tiên Linh	January 21	–
2019	2IDOL	Yeah1TV	2	All	March 26–27	–
2019	Siêu bất ngờ	HTV7	1	All	April 21	S4 E24
2019	Bữa trưa vui vẻ (Happy Lunch)	VTV6	1	Lệ Trang, Minxy, Sachi, Thu Nga, Trùng Dương	August 10	–
2019	Đại tiệc FA	VTV6	1	Anna, Dona, Hikari, Janie, Kaycee, Lệ Trang, Linh Mai, Mon, Minxy, Sachi, Sunny, Thu Nga, Tiên Linh, Trúc Phạm, Trùng Dương, Xuân Ca	August 11	Guest
2019	Một trăm triệu một phút (Million Dollar Minute Vietnam)	VTV3	1	Ánh Sáng, Kaycee, Thu Nga	December 22	Contestants

=== Films ===
Year	Name	Channel	Platform	Members	Note
2018	Tình đầu đại ca	DIEN QUAN Film	YouTube	Tiên Linh	Before joining SGO48
2019	LaLa School S4: Trại hè âm nhạc (Music Summer Camp)	LA LA School	YouTube	Linh Mai, Trùng Dương, Thu Nga, Anna, Ánh Sáng, Mochi, Lệ Trang	-

=== Reality shows ===
Year	Name	Channel	No. of episodes	Members	Note
2019	Pinker School	Yeah1 TV – VTVCab 17; UM Channel – VTVCab 15	8	E1: Ánh Sáng, Anna, Ashley, Celia, Hikari, Janie, Kaycee, Lệ Trang, Linh Mai, Mochi, Mon, Như Thảo, Sachi, Sunny, Thu Nga, Tiên Linh, Trúc Phạm, Trùng Dương, Xuân Ca E2: Ánh Sáng, Anna, Dona, Gia Nghi, Hikari, Janie, Kaycee, Lệ Trang, Linh Mai, Mochi, Sachi, Sunny, Tammy, Thu Nga, Tiên Linh, Trùng Dương: E3: Team A: Gia Nghi, Janie, Linh Mai, Tien Linh Team B: Anh Sang, Anna, Hikari, Sunny Team C: Dona, Le Trang, Thu Nga and Trung Duong Team D: Kaycee, Mochi, Sachi, Tammy: E4: Team 1: Man Nghi, Tammy, Tien Linh and Trung Duong Team 2: Ashley, Hikari, Le Trang and Sunny Team 3: Linh Mai, Mochi, Sachi, Thu Nga Team 4: Anh Sang, Anna, Janie, Truc Pham Team 5: Dona, Gia Nghi, Ni Ni Team 6: Elena, Minxy, Phung Nhi: E5: Anh Sang, Anna, Ashley, Celia, Dona, Gia Nghi, Hikari, Janie, Kaycee, Le Trang, Linh Mai, Mochi, Mon, Minxy, Nhu Thao, Sachi, Sunny, Tammy, Thu Nga, Tien Linh, Trúc Phạm, Trùng Dương, Xuân Ca; E6: Ashley, Celia, Dona, Elena, Gia Nghi, Hikari, Le Trang, Minxy, Mon, Nhu Thao, Ni Ni, Phung Nhi, Sunny, Truc Pham, Trung Duong, Xuan Ca; E7: Team 1: Kaycee (Team Leader), Hikari, Minxy, Tien Linh Team 2: Sachi (Team Leader), Ashley, Mochi, Thu Nga Team 3: Anna (Team Leader), Tien Linh, Trung Duong, Truc Pham, Sunny Team 4: Anh Sang (Team Leader), Janie, Le Trang, Linh Mai, Xuan Ca: E8: Team 1: Anh Sang, Janie, Sachi, Xuan Ca Team 2: Anna, Ashley, Mochi, Trung Duong Team 3: Hikari, Minxy, Thu Nga, Truc Pham, Sunny Team 4: Kaycee, Le Trang, Linh Mai and Tien Linh	–
2020	Senbatsu Battle	Yeah1 TV – VTVCab 17; SGO48 YouTube	9	E1: Ánh Sáng, Anna, Ashley, Dona, Hikari, Janie, Kaycee, Lệ Trang, Linh Mai, Mẫn Nghi, Minxy, Mochi, Mon, Như Thảo, Nini, Phụng Nhi E2: Sachi, Sunny, Tammy, Thu Nga, Trúc Phạm, Trùng Dương, Tiên Linh, Xuân Ca E3: Team A: Xuân Ca(Leader), DONA, Linh Mai, Mẫn Nghi, Như Thảo, Sunny; Team Baby Queen: Sachi (Leader), Ánh Sáng, Hikari, Mon, Thu Nga, Trùng Dương; Team Eyeliner: Minxy(Leader), Ashley, Janie, Kaycee, Tammy, Trúc Phạm; Team Mỡ: Anna(Leader), Lệ Trang, Mochi, Ni Ni, Phụng Nhi, Tiên Linh; E4: Team A: Xuân Ca(Leader), DONA, Linh Mai, Mẫn Nghi, Như Thảo, Sunny; Team Baby Queen: Trùng Dương(Leader), Ánh Sáng, Hikari, Mon, Thu Nga; Team Eyeliner: Minxy(Leader), Ashley, Janie, Kaycee, Tammy, Trúc Phạm; Team Mỡ: Anna(Leader), Lệ Trang, Mochi, Ni Ni, Phụng Nhi, Tiên Linh; E5: Team A: Xuân Ca(Leader), Dona, Linh Mai, Mẫn Nghi, Như Thảo, Sunny; Team Baby Queen: Trùng Dương(Leader), Ánh Sáng, Hikari, Mon, Thu Nga; Team Eyeliner: Minxy(Leader), Ashley, Janie, Kaycee, Tammy, Trúc Phạm; Team Mỡ: Anna(Leader), Lệ Trang, Mochi, Ni Ni, Tiên Linh; Guest: Phụng Nhi; E6: Team A: Xuân Ca(Leader), Dona, Linh Mai, Mẫn Nghi, Như Thảo, Sunny; Team Baby Queen: Trùng Dương(Leader), Ánh Sáng, Hikari, Mon, Thu Nga; Team Eyeliner: Minxy(Leader), Ashley, Janie, Kaycee, Tammy, Trúc Phạm; Team Mỡ: Anna(Leader), Lệ Trang, Mochi, Ni Ni, Phụng Nhi, Tiên Linh; E7: All members; E8: Team A: Xuân Ca(Leader), DONA, Linh Mai, Mẫn Nghi, Sunny; Team Baby Queen: Trùng Dương(Leader), Ánh Sáng, Hikari, Mon, Thu Nga; Team Eyeliner: Minxy(Leader), Ashley, Janie, Kaycee, Tammy, Trúc Phạm; Team Mỡ: Anna(Leader), Lệ Trang, Mochi, Ni Ni, Tiên Linh; Guest: Như Thảo; E9+E10: Contestants: Anna, Ánh Sáng, Ashley, Hikari, Janie, Kaycee, Linh Mai, Mẫn Nghi, Mochi, Ni Ni, Tammy, Thu Nga, Tiên Linh, Trúc Phạm, Trùng Dương, Xuân Ca; Guest: Dona, Lệ Trang, Minxy, Mon, Như Thảo, Sunny	

=== Radio broadcast ===
Year	Name	Members	Note
2019	SGO48 Radio Show	Mochi, Sachi, Sunny, Thu Nga	Ep 1
2019	SGO48 Radio Show	Gia Nghi, Linh Mai, Mon, Xuân Ca	Ep 2
2019	SGO48 Radio Show	Ánh Sáng, Kaycee, Lệ Trang, Mochi, Minxy, Tiên Linh	Ep 3
2019	VOH Radio Online	Ánh Sáng, Anna, Kaycee, Linh Mai	–

=== Documentaries ===
Year	Name	Channel	No. of episodes	Members	Note
2018	Road To The Dream / Hành Trình Vươn Tới Ước Mơ	SGO48	4	Senbatsu	–
2019	SGO48: Light Up Your Dream	SGO48	3	Senbatsu	–
2019	SGO48 2nd Single Documentary	SGO48	7	Senbatsu	–
