= MK Restaurant Group =

Thai restaurant company

MK Restaurant Group Public Company Limited
- Type: Public company
- Traded as: SET: M
- ISIN: ISIN: TH4577010002
- Industry: Food
- Founded: March 2, 1986 (first MK restaurant); July 10, 1989 (company registration)
- Founder: Makong King Yee
- Headquarters: 1200 Debaratna Road, Bang Na Tai, Bang Na district, Bangkok
- Key people: Rit Thirakomen (Chairman and CEO)
- Products: Restaurants
- Revenue: 17,233.76 million baht (2018)
- Total assets: 16,981.55 million baht (June 30, 2019)
- Total equity: 14,376.80 million baht (June 30, 2019)
- Website: www.mkrestaurant.com

MK Restaurant Group Public Company Limited is a Thai restaurant operator headquartered in Bangkok, Thailand. The business originated in 1962 as a small Thai eatery in Siam Square founded by Thongkam Mekto, before expanding into sukiyaki restaurants in 1986 under the management of Rit Thirakomen.

Listed on the Stock Exchange of Thailand since August 2013 under the ticker symbol M, the company operates multiple restaurant chains across Thailand and overseas. Alongside its flagship brand MK Suki, its portfolio includes the Japanese restaurant chain Yayoi and Laem Charoen Seafood.

As of December 31, 2024, the company operated 441 MK Suki restaurants (including 5 MK Gold and 4 MK Live outlets), 193 Yayoi Japanese restaurants, 31 Laem Charoen Seafood restaurants, 15 Miyazaki restaurants, 3 Le Siam Thai restaurants, 3 Bizzy Box outlets, 3 Le Petit outlets, 2 Hakata Japanese restaurants, and 1 Na Siam Thai restaurant. Internationally, it has granted restaurant franchises in Japan, Vietnam, and Laos, and established a joint venture to operate restaurants in Singapore.

== History ==
MK Restaurant originated as a single-unit Thai eatery located in Siam Square. On August 17, 1962, Thongkam Mekto acquired the business from its previous owner, Makong King Yee, a Hong Kong businessman from whose initials the name "MK" was derived. The early menu featured dishes such as Hainanese chicken rice, pad thai, pad kee mao, braised beef, steamed snakehead fish with pickled plum (pla chon pae sa), and Korean-style charcoal-grilled beef. The eatery later expanded into two units. In 1984, Samrit Chirathivat, former chairman of Central Department Store Co., Ltd., invited Thongkam to open a Thai restaurant inside the Central Ladprao shopping center under the new name "Green MK".

On March 2, 1986, Green MK was converted into the first MK Suki restaurant. Around the same period, Thongkam's children and son-in-law joined the business to introduce modern marketing practices and expand the branch network. On January 11, 1996, the company began replacing liquefied petroleum gas (LPG) cooking stoves with electric sukiyaki pots to improve safety for customers and staff, alongside renovating its restaurant interiors and in-store products.
