= D.AAA =

Single by BNK48

from the album -
- Language: Thai
- A-side: "ดีอะ (D.AAA)"
- B-side: "Sukida Sukida Sukida"; "Only today – Band Version"; "Only today – Acapella Version"
- Released: March 13, 2021 (debut); March 29, 2021 (CD)
- Genre: Pop, T-Pop
- Label: iAM
- Producer: Yasushi Akimoto

BNK48 singles chronology
"Heavy Rotation" (2020)	"D.AAA" (2021)	"Sayonara Crawl" (2022)

Music video
- "ดีอะ" on YouTube

"D.AAA" (Thai: ดีอะ ; English: That's Great) is the 10th single of the all-girl Thai idol group BNK48. It was released in Thailand on March 13, 2021. This is the group's first original composed main single that consists of "D.AAA" and two b-side songs, "Sukida Sukida Sukida - ชอบเธอนะ" and "Only today" which has 2 versions: Band Version and Acapella Version.

== Track listings ==
=== Type A ===
No.	Title	Music	Thai lyrics	Length
1.	"ดีอะ (D.AAA)"	Pongjak Pitthanporn; Paosarit Lekchom; Auttakorn Deachmak	Pongjak Phithanporn; Tanupop Notthananon; Paosarit Lekchom	3:27
2.	"Sukida Sukida Sukida - ชอบเธอนะ" (A cover of AKB48's "Sukida Sukida Sukida")	Itagaki Yusuke	Prapop Chomthaworn	3:37
3.	"Only today – Band Version" (A cover of AKB48's "Only today")	Ouchi Tetsuya	Tanupop Notthananon	3:54
4.	"ดีอะ (D.AAA) (off vocal ver.)"			3:27
5.	"Sukida Sukida Sukida – ชอบเธอนะ (off vocal ver.)"			3:37
6.	"Only today – Band Version (off vocal ver.)"			3:54
Total length:				21:56

=== Type B ===
No.	Title	Music	Thai lyrics	Length
1.	"ดีอะ (D.AAA)"	Pongjak Pitthanporn; Paosarit Lekchom; Auttakorn Deachmak	Pongjak Phithanporn; Tanupop Notthananon; Paosarit Lekchom	3:27
2.	"Sukida Sukida Sukida – ชอบเธอนะ" (A cover of AKB48's "Sukida Sukida Sukida")	Itagaki Yusuke	Prapop Chomthaworn	3:37
3.	"Only today – Acapella Version" (A cover of AKB48's "Only today")	Ouchi Tetsuya	Tanupop Notthananon	4:22
4.	"ดีอะ (D.AAA) (off vocal ver.)"			3:27
5.	"Sukida Sukida Sukida – ชอบเธอนะ (off vocal ver.)"			3:37
6.	"Only today – Acapella Version (off vocal ver.)"			4:22
Total length:				22:52

== Participating members ==
Note: The following is the list of members performing in each song. Members in bold refers to the center of the song (team status at the time of the single's release).

=== "ดีอะ (D.AAA)" ===
Performed by 16 members consisting of:

- Team BIII: Cherprang, Jane, Jennis, Kaew, Minmin, Noey, Pun, Wee
- Team NV: Gygee, Kaimook, **Mobile**, Music, Namneung, Orn, Pupe, Tarwaan

=== "Sukida Sukida Sukida – ชอบเธอนะ" ===
Performed by 16 members consisting of:

- Team BIII: Cherprang, Jane, Jennis, Kaew, Minmin, Noey, Pun, Wee
- Team NV: Gygee, Kaimook, Mobile, **Music**, Namneung, Orn, Pupe, Tarwaan

=== "Only today – Band Version (Type A)" ===
Performed by 7 members consisting of:

- Team BIII: Korn (Keyboard), Panda (Bass & Vocal)
- Team NV: Bamboo (Drums), Namsai (Drum Pad), Nine (Electric Guitar & Vocal), Phukkhom (Keyboard), Satchan (Acoustic Guitar)

=== "Only today – Acapella Version (Type B)" ===
Performed by 7 members consisting of:

- Team BIII: Miori, Myyu, Niky
- Team NV: Fond, Jaa, New, Stang

== Awards and nominations ==
Year	Award	Category	Nominated work	Result
2565	TOTY Music Awards 2021	Popular female artist songs	ดีอะ (D.AAA)	Nominated
