= Shonichi =

2008 song by AKB48

"Shonichi" (初日; "First Day") is a song by the Japanese idol girl group AKB48, featured on the group's ninth single "Baby! Baby! Baby!" released in 2008, 12th single "Namida Surprise!" released in 2009, and second album Kamikyokutachi released in 2010.

The song has been covered by AKB48's international sister groups in their respective local languages, including the Indonesian version by JKT48, featured on the group's first album Heavy Rotation released in 2013, the Thai version by BNK48, released as the group's third single in 2018, the Mandarin version by AKB48 Team SH in 2019.

== BNK48 version ==
"Shonichi – Wan Raek"
- Type A cover

Single by BNK48

from the album River
- Released: 7 May 2018
- Genre: Pop
- Label: BNK48 Office
- Songwriters: Prapop Chomthaworn; Trai Bhumiratna

BNK48 singles chronology
"Koi Suru Fortune Cookie – Khukki Siangthai" (2017)	"Shonichi – Wan Raek" (2018)	"Kimi wa Melody" (2018)

Alternative cover
- Type B cover

Music video
- "Wan Raek" on YouTube

The Thai idol group BNK48, a sister group of AKB48, covered the song, naming it "Wan Raek" (Thai: วันแรก; IPA: [wan.rɛ̂ːk]; "First Day").

=== Production and release ===
The release of the song "Wan Raek" as the group's third single was announced at the group's fan meeting, called BNK48 We Wish You, held at Siam Square One in Bangkok on 24 December 2017. At the same event, the names of the sixteen members forming the senbatsu for the song was announced, including Cherprang, Jaa, Jan, Jane, Jennis, Kaew, Kaimook, Mobile, Music, Namneung, Noey, Orn, Pun, Pupe, Satchan, and Tarwaan, with Music and Noey as the centres.

The single will be released on 7 May 2018 in two types with different track lists: Type A containing covers of AKB48's "Sakura no Hanabiratachi" and "Namida Surprise!" as the B-side tracks, and Type B containing the Sakura no Hanabiratachi cover and a cover of AKB48's "Anata to Christmas Eve" as the B-side tracks.

Like the two previous singles, the cover art of this single was produced by The Uni_form Design Studio. The front cover of each type contains the Japanese word shonichi written with 16 strokes representing the 16 senbatsu members, topped with the Thai word wan raek written by Music (for Type A) and Noey (for Type B).

The lyrics of the song "Wan Raek" are the penwork of Prapop Chomthaworn (Thai: ประภพ ชมถาวร), a member of the band Superbaker.

Lyricised by Trai Bhumiratna (Thai: ตรัย ภูมิรัตน), "Khamsanya Haeng Christmas Eve", the cover of "Anata to Christmas Eve", was recorded by Jan and Kaew as a duet.

At the handshake event held at The Mall Ngam Wongwang in Bangkok on 13 and 14 January 2018, the members responsible for the song "Namida Surprise!" were announced, consisting of Can, Cherprang, Izurina, Jennis, Kate, Korn, Miori, Mobile, Music, Namsai, Nink, Noey, Piam, Pun, Orn, and Tarwaan, with Tarwaan serving as the centre.

Following Jan's sudden graduation on 29 January 2018, Korn replaces her in performing the song "Wan Raek" and Tarwaan replaces her in performing the song "Khamsanya Haeng Christmas Eve".

=== Promotion ===
The senbatsu performed the song "Wan Raek" for the first time at the National Stadium in Bangkok on 22 March 2018.

The music video for "Khamsanya Haeng Christmas Eve" was released on 26 February 2018 and was directed by Hiro Inoue.

Directed by Pairat Kumwan (Thai: ไพรัช คุ้มวัน), the music video for the title song, "Wan Raek", was released on 10 April 2018.

=== Track listing ===
- Boldness indicates centres.

==== Type A ====
No.	Title	Lyrics	Performers	Length
1.	"Wan Raek (Thai: วันแรก; "First Day")" (cover of AKB48's "Shonichi")	Prapop Chomthaworn	Cherprang, Jaa, Jan, Jane, Jennis, Kaew, Kaimook, Mobile, Music, Namneung, Noey, Orn, Pun, Pupe, Satchan, Tarwaan (Korn replacing Jan after the latter's graduation)
2.	"Khwamsongcham Lae Kham-amla (Thai: ความทรงจำและคำอำลา; "Memories and Farewell")" (cover of AKB48's "Sakura no Hanabiratachi")	Tanupop Notayanont
3.	"Prakai Namta Lae Roiyim (Thai: ประกายน้ำตาและรอยยิ้ม; "Sparkle of Tears and Smiles")" (cover of AKB48's "Namida Surprise!")	Trai Bhumiratna	Can, Cherprang, Izurina, Jennis, Kate, Korn, Miori, Mobile, Music, Namsai, Nink, Noey, Piam, Pun, Orn, Tarwaan
4.	"Wan Raek" (Off Vocal Version)
5.	"Khwamsongcham Lae Kham-amla" (Off Vocal Version)
6.	"Prakai Namta Lae Roiyim" (Off Vocal Version)

==== Type B ====
No.	Title	Lyrics	Performers	Length
1.	"Wan Raek"	Prapop	as above
2.	"Khwamsongcham Lae Kham-amla"	Tanupop	as above
3.	"Khamsanya Haeng Christmas Eve (Thai: คำสัญญาแห่งคริสต์มาสอีฟ; "Promise of Christmas Eve")" (cover of AKB48's "Anata to Christmas Eve")	Trai Bhumiratna	Jan, Kaew (Tarwaan replacing Jan after the latter's graduation)
4.	"Wan Raek" (Off Vocal Version)
5.	"Khwamsongcham Lae Kham-amla" (Off Vocal Version)
6.	"Khamsanya Haeng Christmas Eve" (Off Vocal Version)
