= La-Ong-Fong =

Thai pop band

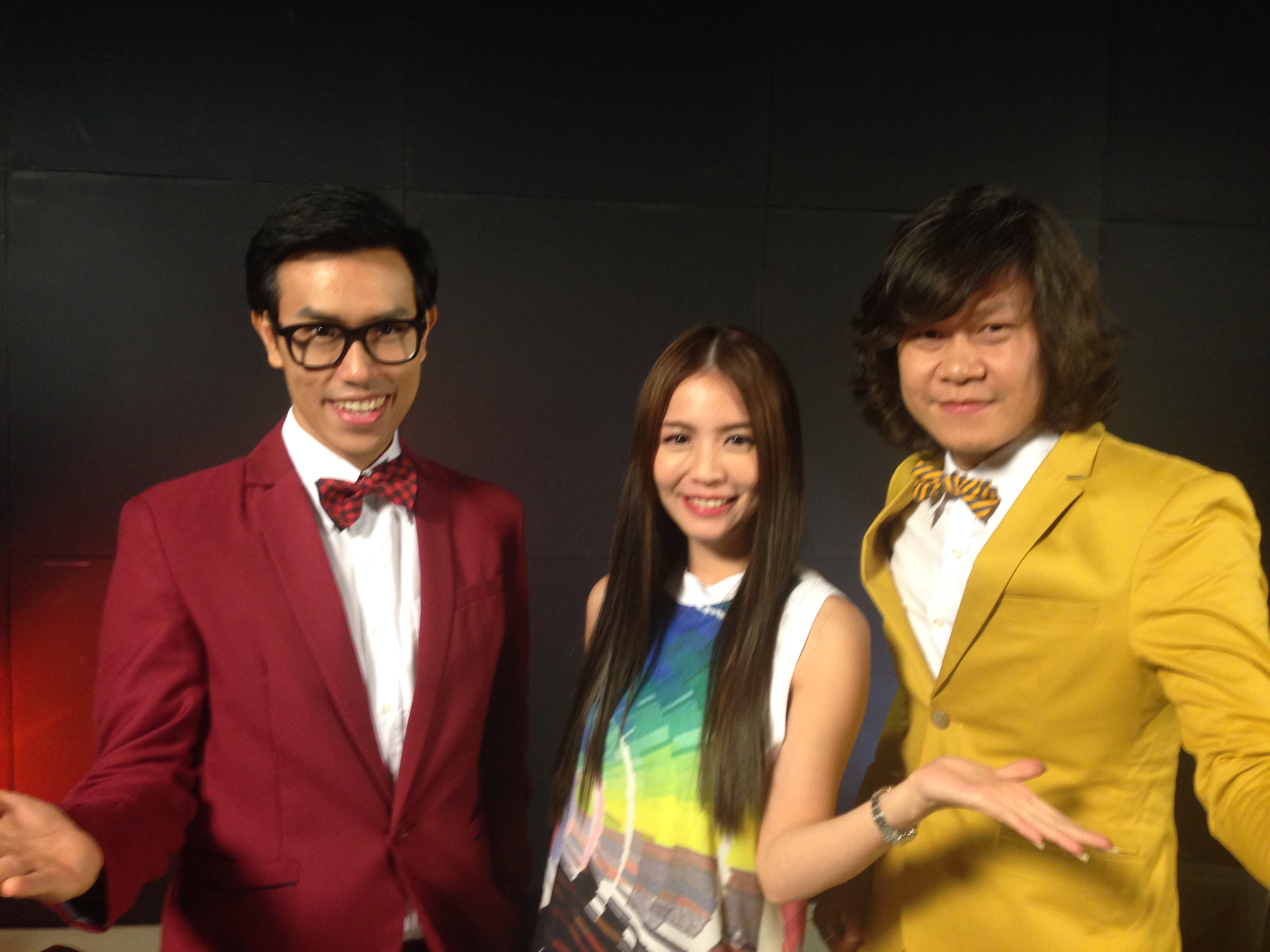
- La Ong Fong in 2014

Background information
- Origin: Bangkok, Thailand
- Genres: Pop; Swedish Pop
- Years active: 1994–present
- Labels: ร่องเสียงลำใย (Thailand; 1994–1996); Spicy Disc Records (Thailand; 2004–present)
- Members: Kornkamol Chaiwattanamethin; Tanupop Notayanont; Pongchuk Pissathanporn
- Past members: Visa Atthaseri; Danop Srikao; Vichaya Vatanasapt
- Website: Official website

La-Ong-Fong (Thai: ละอองฟอง) is a Thai pop band. It was formed in 1996. The name of the band comes from enfant (French for "child"), transliterated as "อองฟอง" (pronounced Ong-Fong). Then they put the word "ละ" (La) in front of it, to make it sound more Thai – "ละอองฟอง" (La-Ong-Fong) – as "ละออง" (La-Ong) in Thai has its own meaning as "drizzle", and "ฟอง" (Fong) as "bubble".

The band's music style is influenced by Swedish pop. The notabilities of this band are a vibrant music that mixes jazz, pop and rock together, and the singer's vocals are crystal clear.

== History of the band ==
La-Ong-Fong started from the meeting between Ae and Chomphoo in the Coke Duet Singing Contest in 1988. Then, Chomphoo signed as an artist at Grammy Records and invited Ae to join the band. Ae invited Fluke, a senior at his old school to be the drummer, Nhong, his colleague, to be the keyboardist and Man, Nhong's junior at university, to be the guitarist.

The first album of the band, Volume 1, was not quite successful in terms of sales and responses from the audiences generally. After that, the band was dispersed.

In November 2004, three members of La-Ong-Fong came back and released a new EP album, Volume 2. This album was well received by both new audiences and fans. On 5 September 2005, they released the full album, Cozy Collection.

In 2011, La-Ong-Fong, with a new look, released a new album, Wind-up City. Ab Chob (แอบชอบ ; "like") is the most popular song on the album.

== Band members ==
=== Original members ===
- Visa Attaseri (Chomphoo) – lead vocals
- Vichaya Vatanasapt (Nhong) – keyboards
- Danop Srikao (Fluke) – drums
- Tanupop Notayanont (Man) – guitar
- Pongchuk Pissathanporn (Ae) – bass guitar

=== Current members ===
- Kornkamol Chaiwattanamethin (On) – lead vocals
- Tanupop Notayanont (Man) – guitar
- Pongchuk Pissathanporn (Ae) – bass guitar / backing vocals

== Discography ==
=== Volume 1 ===
Rong Seang Lam Yai records (2539)

1. "Wan" (วัน ; "Day")
2. "La" (ลา ; "Bye")
3. "Korb Fah" (ขอบฟ้า ; "Horizon")
4. "Rao" (เรา ; "Us")
5. "Rak" (รัก ; "Love")
6. "Kuen" (คืน ; "Night")
7. "Lom" (ลม ; "Wind")
8. "Mont" (มนต์ ; "Magic")
9. "Pak" (พัก ; "Break")

=== EP Volume 2 ===
(No record label)

1. "Long" (ลอง ; "Try")
2. "Fak Fha" (ฝากฟ้า ; "Leave with sky")
3. "Message Rak" (เมสเสจรัก ; "Love Message")
4. "Lunla...Meua Dai Pob Ter" (ลัลลา..เมื่อได้พบเธอ ; "Happy when I meet her")

=== Cozy Collection ===
Spicy Disc Records (Sep 2005)

1. "Tang Jai Deaw" (ต่างใจเดียว ; "Each heart")
2. "Ter Ja Cheua Mai" (เธอจะเชื่อไหม ; "Will you believe?")
3. "Kit Tueng" (คิดถึง ; "Miss")
4. "Lunla...Meua Dai Pob Ter" (ลัลลา..เมื่อได้พบเธอ ; "Happy when I meet her")
5. "Message Rak" (เมสเสจรัก ; "Love Message")
6. "Kon Bon Fha" (คนบนฟ้า ; "Person on sky")
7. "Ter Kub Chan" (เธอกับฉัน ; "You and me")
8. "Reang Rah" (เริงร่า ; "Joyful")
9. "Dok Mai Khang Khang Ter" (ดอกไม้ข้างๆเธอ ; "Flower beside her")
10. "Tang Jai Deaw" (ต่างใจเดียว ; "Each heart") (Minus)
11. "Long" (ลอง ; "Try")

=== EP Ngao Jon Chin (เหงาจนชิน; "Lonely, be accustomed") ===
Spicy Disc Records (2007)

1. "Ngao Jon Chin" (เหงาจนชิน ; "Lonely, be accustomed")
2. "Ter Ja Cheua Mai" (เธอจะเชื่อไหม ; "Will you believe?")
3. "Ter Kub Chan" (เธอกับฉัน ; "You and me")

=== Love Story ===
Spicy Disc Records (2009)

1. "Sing Tee Mai Roo" (สิ่งที่ไม่รู้ ; "Unknown things")

=== Tales ===
Spicy Disc Records (2009)

1. "Korb Fah Phan Nam Ra Ya Tang Ra Wang Song Rao" (ขอบฟ้า แผ่นน้ำ ระยะทางระหว่างสองเรา ; "Horizon, water plate and distance between us")

=== Past Forward ===
Spicy Disc Records (2010)

1. "Fhun Lam Aieng" (ฝันลำเอียง ; "Unfair dream")

=== Wind-up City ===
1. "So in Love"
2. "Ab Chob" (แอบชอบ ; "Like")
3. "Kod" (กอด ; "Hug")
4. "A Rai" (อะไร ; "What")
5. "Ngao Jon Chin" (เหงาจนชิน ; "Lonely, be accustomed")
6. "Meua Rhai Ja Chao" (เมื่อไหร่จะเช้า ; "When the morning")
7. "Kae Fhun Kor Por" (แค่ฝันก็พอ ; "It is just a dream")
8. "Rak Pued Peay" (รักเปิดเผย ; "Open Love")
9. "Ror" (รอ ; "Wait")
10. "Krai Nhor" (ใครหนอ ; "Who")
11. "Ter Tung nun" (เธอทั้งนั้น ; "Only you")
12. "Khob Khun na" (ขอบคุณนะ ; "Thank you")

== Concert ==
Year	Name of concert	Date	Place	Number of Performing	Note
2011	Love for the blind	10 September 2011	Auditorium Thammasat University	1	
2011	Basket Band Phuen Kun Mun Tong Free (เพื่อนกันมัน(ส์)ต้องฟรี)	1 October 2011	Centerpoint playhouse at Central World	2	Guest
2011	Big Mountain Music Festival 3	10–11 December 2011	Bonanza, Khao Yai	2	12 Big Mountain Music Festival
2011	+1 Ukulele Concert	18 December 2011	Scala theater	1	
2012	Season of love song 2	21–22 January 2012	Suan Pheung resort, Ratchaburi	1	
2012	Fat Fest Bangkok	12 February 2012	Muang Thong Thani Lakeside	1	
2012	Fat Fest Chiang Mai	18 February 2012	Centralplaza Chiangmai Airport	1	
2012	Fat Fest Khonkaen	10 March 2012	Auditorium Khonkaen University	1	
2012	Overlove Music Festival	30 June 2012	Silverlake Vineyard, Pattaya	1	

== Popularity ==
=== 2005 ===
- Tang Jai Deaw song (ต่างใจเดียว ; "Each heart") reached number 77 on the Fat 100 chart annual 2005 and the greatest rank was 17th on weekly rankings. Moreover, it was also in the Fat Radio chart for 29 weeks that is the third longest.

=== 2011 ===
- A Rai song (อะไร ; "What") reached number 25 on the Fat 100 annual 2011 and the greatest rank was third on weekly rankings.
