= Asuka Kuramochi =

Asuka Kuramochi 倉持 明日香
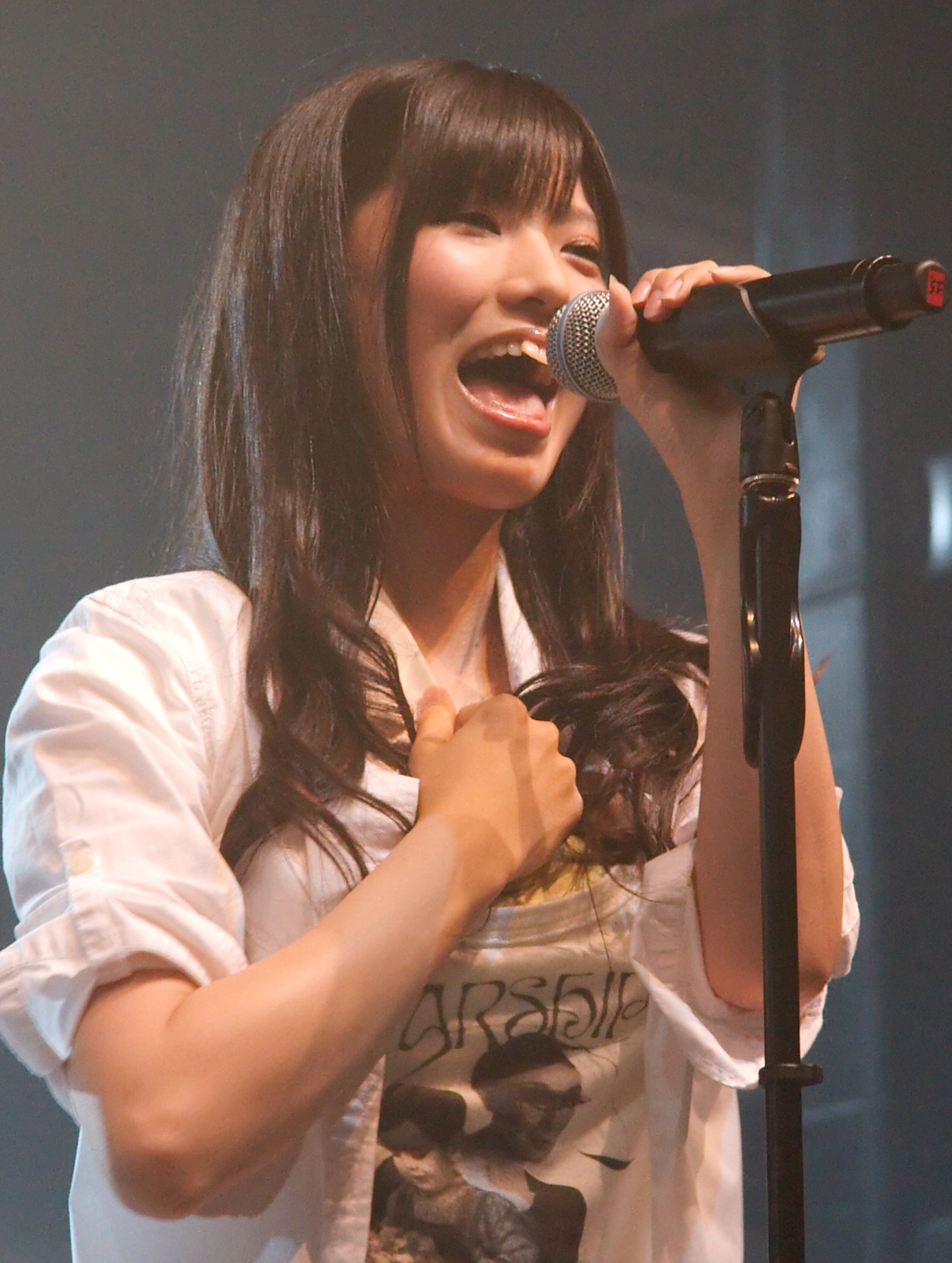
- Asuka Kuramochi at Japan Expo 2009, Paris

Background information
- Also known as: Mocchii(もっちぃ); Mochiko(もちこ)
- Born: September 11, 1989 (age 37); Kanagawa Prefecture, Japan
- Genres: J-pop
- Years active: July 2007 - present
- Label: Zest Inc.
- Website: KuramochiAsuka.jp

Asuka Kuramochi (倉持 明日香, Kuramochi Asuka; born September 11, 1989, in Kanagawa Prefecture, Japan) is a singer, actress, and a former member of the idol group AKB48 under Team B.

== Career ==
Asuka Kuramochi initiated her career in 2007 by passing the AKB48 first trainee audition. In March 2008, she was promoted to Team K. Her first appearance in the AKB48 Senbatsu Election in 2009 resulted in a 21st rank. On August 23, 2009, during the AKB48 Bunshin no Jutsu Tour, it was announced that she would be transferred to Team A.

In the 2010 Senbatsu Election, Kuramochi ranked 23rd and officially became a member of Team A on May 21, 2010. September 8 of the same year marked her debut as part of the sub-unit French Kiss, alongside Yuki Kashiwagi and Aki Takajō. She consistently ranked in the subsequent Senbatsu Elections, securing 21st place in 2011 and 22nd place in 2012.

A team shuffle in 2012 resulted in Kuramochi's return to Team K, with new team activities commencing on November 1, 2012. In April 2013, the release of her first solo single, "Itsumo Soba ni" under Avex was announced, with the single debuting on May 29, 2013. That year, in the AKB48 32nd Single Senbatsu General Election, she ranked 36th, placing her in Next Girls.

In 2014, during an AKB48 Group Grand Team Reshuffling Festival, Kuramochi was transferred to Team B and appointed captain. On July 18, 2015, she announced her graduation from AKB48 to pursue a career in sportscasting, with her final performance on August 17, 2015. Post-graduation, in 2016, she appeared in the MBS/TBS drama "OL Desu ga, Kyabajou Hajimemashita" (OLですが、キャバ嬢はじめました) as Nanako Koizumi(小泉菜々子個、Koizumi Nanako), It was her first appearance in the drama since graduating from AKB48.

On September 28, 2025, Asuka Kuramochi announced that she had parted ways with her agency, Watanabe Entertainment, after 15 years together. Kuramochi is currently under the management of a Japanese agency, Zest Inc.

== Personal life ==
On June 27, 2026, Asuka Kuramochi announced her marriage during a special announcement in a pro-wrestling ring. Her agency confirmed that her husband is a member of the general public, and that she intends to continue her entertainment career.

== Solo Single Sales ==
- Kuramochi's solo single, "Itsumo Soba ni", was released on May 29, 2013, selling over 31,424 copies.
