= One Take (film) =

2020 documentary film

- Official poster with original release date
- Directed by: Manatsanun Panlertwongskul
- Starring: BNK48
- Production companies: iAM Films; Independent Artist Management Co., Ltd.
- Distributed by: Netflix
- Release date: June 18, 2020
- Running time: 85 minutes
- Country: Thailand

One Take (also known as BNK48: One Take) is a 2020 documentary film directed by Manatsanun Panlertwongskul. The premise revolves around the Thai girl group BNK48, and their preparations for the 6th Single Senbatsu General Election.

== Release ==
One Take is the second documentary that features BNK48, after BNK48: Girls Don't Cry in 2018. Originally, the working title was Real Me: BNK48 Documentary Season 2. One Take was originally going to be released on April 1, 2020, but was postponed due to the COVID-19 pandemic.

== Synopsis ==
One Take follow the members preparation before the group first General Election event, where the fans able to vote their members into the next line-up for the group 6th single. The film focusing on atmosphere of the members competition between the first and second members.

== Cast ==
- BNK48
- Nataphol Pavaravadhana, BNK48's general manager
- Nariaki Terada, Corporate officer of AKS
- Junji Yuasa, Representative Director of Sizuk Entertainment
- Triumphs Kingdom, singer
- Marie Eugenie Le Lay, Singer

== Music ==
The documentary includes the song "It's Life" sung by member Cherprang and "It's Me" by Suchaya Saenkhot. Both of the song was released on February 14 and included in group 7th single "77 no Suteki na Machi e - (77ดินแดนแสนวิเศษ)" Type-A version.
