= 2020 in Philippine music =

The following is a list of notable events that are related to Philippine music in 2020.

== Debuts and disbanding in 2020 ==
=== Debuting groups ===
- 1st.One
- Baby Blue
- Bandang Lapis
- Clover
- The Knobs
- Wonder Hiraya

=== Solo debut ===
- Aldrich Ang
- Alexa Ilacad
- Charles Dela Cruz
- Emman
- Gabba
- Ivana Alawi
- J-Nine
- Kemrie
- King Promdi
- Maine Mendoza
- Mikee Sibayan
- Mimiyuuuh
- Minzy
- SAB
- Tanikala Morobeats
- Zild

=== Reunion/comebacks ===
- BBS (Big Band Syndicate)
- Eevee
- Us-2 Evil-0

=== Disbandments ===
- CLOVER
- Music Hero
- Slapshock

=== On hiatus ===
- IV of Spades
- Munimuni

== Releases in 2020 ==
The following albums were released in 2020, with all of them released in the Philippines. Note: All soundtracks (Note: Coming from movies or shows.) are not included in this list.

=== First-quarter ===
==== January ====
Date	Album	Artist(s)	Genre(s)	Label (s)	Ref
24	Harana Coma (EP)	One Click Straight	Indie pop, alternative	Offshore Music	
31	Wala Ka Na	Michael Dutchi Libranda	Pop	Independent	

==== February ====
Date	Album	Artist(s)	Genre(s)	Label (s)	Ref
7	Unplugged (EP)	Imago	P-pop Rock	Universal Records	
7	Better Weather	Leila Alcasid	OPM Pop	Tarsier Records	
14	Heaven Knows (Single)	Morissette, Rick Price	Pop	Sony Music Entertainment	
14	lovesound	Jason Dhakal	R&B	Warner Music Philippines	
19	High Tension (Single)	MNL48	P-pop J-pop Pop	Star Music	
19	Hindi Nag-Iba	Ivy of PPop Generation	Ballad OPM	VIVA Records	
20	ena mori (EP)	Ena Mori	Indie Pop	Offshore Music	
21	Umaga (Live)	The Juans	Pop OPM	Viva Records	
28	100% Human (EP)	Acapellago	OPM Pop	Viva Records	
28	Ianna	Ianna	P-pop Pop	Star Music	
28	Panimula	Mark Oblea	Pop	Universal Records	
29	Small World	Gracenote	Pop P-pop	Universal Records	
29	Baliktanaw	Ebe Dancel	Pop OPM	PolyEast Records	
29	Pangarap Ko ang Ibigin Ka	Sarah Geronimo	Pop OPM	Star Pop	

==== March ====
Date	Album	Artist(s)	Genre(s)	Label (s)	Ref
6	It's Getting Dark (EP)	Route 83	Pop	Warner Music Philippines	
17	Wonderland	Wonderland Hiraya	P-pop R&B Pop	Wonderland Ent.	
20	Diwa	Juan Karlos	Rock Pop	MCA Music	
20	Kumakabog Kabog (Pounding Heart)	CLOVER	P-pop Bubblegum Pop Pop	Viva Records	
20	Parang Kailan Lang	Maine Mendoza, Gracenote	OPM	Universal Records	
27	Patawad	Moira Dela Torre	Ballad Pop OPM	Star Music	
27	Pangalan	Unique Salonga	Pop	O/C Records	

=== Second-quarter ===
==== April ====
Date	Album	Artist(s)	Genre(s)	Label (s)	Ref
17	Corner	Kiana V	Pop, R&B	Tarsier Records	
24	Volumes (EP)	Oh, Flamingo!	Indie Rock, alternative	Sony Music Philippines	
3	Eliza Maturan	Eliza Maturan	Pop	Independent	
15	Collected Fiction	Pamphleteer	Indie Folk	Offshore Music	
15	Doors	Ben&Ben	R&B Pop OPM	Sony Music Philippines	

==== May ====
Date	Album	Artist(s)	Genre(s)	Label (s)	Ref
1	This Too Shall Pass	Rico Blanco	Pop	Sony Music Philippines	
8	Ligtas	Bawal Clan	Rap, Underground Hip Hop	Independent	
19	Bawal Lumabas (The Classroom Song)	Kim Chiu	Pop	Star Music	
21	Marikit	Juan Caoile, Kyle	Pop EDM P-pop	Viva Records	
23	This Is Us	Allmo$t	Hip hop	Viva Records	
29	Unang Salita	Jo.e	Pop	Viva Records	
29	EP2 The After Party	The Cokeheads	Pop	Enterphil Entertainment Corporation	

==== June ====
Date	Album	Artist(s)	Genre(s)	Label (s)	Ref
3	Ay, Pusikit! (EP)	Eleazar Galope	R&B/Soul	Himig Agila Records	
4	Lifetime	Ben&Ben	Folk	Sony Music Philippines	
11	Makatha	Makatha	Pop	PolyEast Records	
12	With A Smile	Bea Lorenzo	R&B, Soul	Sony Music Philippines	
26	Akin Ka Na Lang – Latin Version (Single)	Morissette	Latin	Star Music	
28	Ulap	Rob Deniel	Pop, OPM	Viva Records	
29	Sana All	Ivana Alawi	Pop	Star Pop	

=== Third-quarter ===
==== July ====
Date	Album	Artist(s)	Genre(s)	Label (s)	Ref
1	Nakikinig Ka Ba Sa Akin	Ben&Ben	Pop rock	Sony Music Philippines	
10	Short Story	Soulstice	OPM	Viva Records	
10	Collab Sessions (EP)	Garth Garcia	Pop	Ivory Music and Video	
17	Ang Unang Ikot (EP)	The Vowels They Orbit	Pop	Sony Music Philippines	
17	I'm All About You	Mikee Sibayan	Pop	MandaRhyme Productions	
17	Multo	Magnus Haven	Indie, alternative	Warner Music Philippines	
23	Tayo Hanggang Dulo	JaMill	Pop OPM	Star Pop	
24	OPM Akustico	Angela	Pop	PolyEast Records	
27	Marikit (Acoustic Ver)	Juan Caoile, Kyle, Gab	Pop Rap Acoustic P-pop	Viva Entertainment	
29	Lumipas ang Tag-Araw	Sponge Cola	Pop R&B	Sony Music Philippines	
30	Kahit Na Anong Sabihin ng Iba (Hello Stranger OST.)	Seth Fedelin	OPM R&B	Star Music	
30	semilucent 1 (EP)	Paradise Rising	Pop R&B P-pop	88Rising, Paradise Rising,12Tone Music	
30	Uuwian	Emman Nimedez	OPM	Independent	
31	Get in the Zone (Album)	SB19	P-pop EDM Ballad Pop	Sony Music Philippines	
31	You Are The One (Single)	1ST.ONE	P-pop Hip Hop EDM	1ST.ONE Entertainment	
31	Sana Tayo Na	Darren Espanto, Jayda	OPM Pop	Star Music	
31	Mahal Pa Rin Kita	LTNM	Pop OPM	Warner Music Philippines	
31	Kaimerah (EP)	Kaimerah	Indie Rock	Enterphil Entertainment Corporation	
31	Miss You in the Moonlight	Jake Zyrus	OPM Pop	Star Music	
31	With A Smile (Still2gether PH)	Bright Vachirawit	Pop R&B	GMMTV GMMTV Records Star Music	
31	semilucent	Paradise Rising	Pop R&B	88Rising, Paradise Rising, 12Tone Music	
31	Paalam	The Knobs	OPM Rock	Universal Records	

==== August ====
Date	Album	Artist(s)	Genre(s)	Label (s)	Ref
1	Paano Kung (Single)	Kyle Raphael	OPM Ballad	Viva Entertainment	
6	Homework Machine	Zild	Pop	Warner Music Philippines	
8	Dale Dale	SB NewGen	P-pop	Viva Entertainment	
14	Beautiful	Ogie Alcasid, Moira Dela Torre	OPM	Star Music	
14	Tahanan	Victory Worship	Contemporary Christian Music	Victory	
18	Waiting for the End to Start	Itchyworms	Rock	Sony Music Philippines	
21	Ang Sa Iyo Ay Akin	Aegis	Rock	Star Music	
28	Halo Halo	SB NewGen	P-pop, Pop	Viva Entertainment	

==== September ====
Date	Album	Artist(s)	Genre(s)	Label (s)	Ref
1	Sweet Talking Sugar	Baby Blue	Pop, R&B	HHE, Japan Tower Records	
1	Love Story	PHP J.O Sarmiento	P-pop, Pop, R&B	PHP Music Entertainment	
1	Tanikala	Tanikala Morobeats	Hip hop, Pinoy hip hop	Morobeats	
10	XOXO	XOXO	Pop, P-pop, R&B	GMA Music	
18	Maduming Kwarto Playlist	Maduming Kwarto, Pino G and Just Hush	R&B	DRP Records	
18	Mango Showers Vol. 1	Chris Sta. Romana	Indie pop	Enterphil Entertainment Corporation	
19	Rise Single	Iñigo Pascual, Eric Bellinger, Vince Nantes, Zee Avi, & Sam Concepcion	Pop, R&B, Soul, OPM	Tarsier Records	
22	Not For Me	Maris Racal	Pop, R&B, OPM	Sony Music Philippines	
25	Ready, Let Go	Keiko Necesario	Indie pop	Warner Music Philippines	
28	Umaaraw Umuulan Single	December Avenue	OPM	Viva Records	
30	S.S.H. (EP)	One Click Straight	Indie, alternative pop	Island Records Philippines (MCA Music)	
30	Queen of the Night	Versus	Indie, alternative pop	Viva Records	

=== Fourth-quarter ===
==== October ====
Date	Album	Artist(s)	Genre(s)	Label (s)	Ref
8	Can't Wait to Say I Do	KZ Tandingan, TJ Monterde	Pop	Star Music	
8	DYWB (Drink Your Water Bitch)	mimiyuuuh	EDM, P-pop, Hip Hop, Rap, Pop	O/C Records	
9	Mixtape Vol. 1 (EP)	Brisom and Joey Santos	Pop	Viva Records	
9	Distanced (EP)	Timmy Albert	Pop	Mustard Music	
9	Kapalaran	Bea Lorenzo	R&B, Soul	Sony Music Philippines	
15	Hindi Susuko	Lorraine Galvez	Pop	GMA Playlist	
16	Huwag Matakot	This Band	Pop	Viva Records	
16	Wildest Dreams	Nadine Lustre	Pop, R&B	Careless Manila	
16	Impressions	Kemrie	Pop	Universal Records	
23	Migration	BBS, Moonstar88	OPM Pop	Soupstar Music	
28	Paubaya (Single)	Moira Dela Torre	OPM, Ballad & Pop	Star Music	
30	Diyan Ba Sa Langit – Midnite Remix (Single)	Morissette, Jason Dy, KIKX	Pop	One Music	
30	Crashing	Angelina Cruz	Pop	Universal Records	
30	Playing Pretend in the Interim (EP)	Reese Lansangan	Indie, Folk	Soon The Moon	
30	Suyo	Reon	Pop	Philpop, Warner Music Philippines	
31	Hold On (Single)	1stOne	R&B, Pop, Rap, & P-pop	1stOne Entertainment Philippines	
31	Patawad (Deluxe)	Moira Dela Torre	OPM, Ballad & Pop	Star Music	

==== November ====
Date	Album	Artist(s)	Genre(s)	Label (s)	Ref
5	Your Universe (Single)	Sarah Geronimo, Rico Blanco	Pop, Soul & R&B	Viva Records	
6	Di Ka Sayang	Ben&Ben	Folk	Sony Music Entertainment	
6	Kailan Ka Huling Nalungkot?	Eleazar Galope	Contemporary R&B	Himig Agila Records	
6	Galakbay	PHP Yukito X Rhadz	Pop, P-pop & R&B	PHP Music Entertainment	
6	Da Coconut Nut	BINI	Pop, P-pop	ABS-CBN Star Hunt Academy	
6	Sunny Side Tapes (EP)	Good Kid$	Pop R&B	Mustard Music	
6	Bago	Autotelic	Indie, alternative Rock	MCA Music	
9	Oops (Single)	Ex Battalion	Hip Hop, Pop & R&B	Ex Battalion Music Entertainment	
9	Crush	ALLMO$T	Pop & P-pop	Viva Records	
12	Kahit Na Anong Sablay	Maris Racal	OPM, R&B & Pop	Sony Music Philippines	
12	Don't Look Back (Revisited) (EP)	Lola Amour	Rock	Warner Music Philippines	
13	Heartbreak SZN 2	Because	R&B	Viva Records	
13	Vivid (EP)	August Wahh	Indie R&B/soul	Redbox Asia	
13	HIMIG	Various Artist	Pop, P-pop, R&B & OPM	Star Music	
13	Believe in Christmas	Darren Espanto	R&B	MCA Music	
13	Teknik	Shanti Dope, DJ Buddah	Pop, Rap	Universal Records	
15	Marilag	PHP ZIO & Charles	P-pop, EDM, Rap	PHP Music Entertainment	
16	Halika Na	Elisse Joson	OPM	Star Music	
16	Isang Puso Ngayong Pasko	Various Artist	OPM & Pop	GMA Music	
20	Morissette at 14, Vol. 1 (Album)	Morissette	Pop	Flasher Factory	
20	Lovely (Tagalog Version)	Minzy	Pop, R&B, K-pop & OPM	Viva Records	
20	Istorya (Alter Me OST)	Edsel of P-pop Generation	OPM & Ballad	Viva Records	
20	Purple Afternoon (EP)	Paolo Sandejas	Pop	Universal Records	
20	Into The Light	Over October	Alternative	Island Records Philippines	
20	For The Love Of Omelets (Live Version)	The Cokeheads (feat. Cyber Band)	Indie Rock	Enterphil Entertainment Corporation	
20	Kargo	Eevee	Indie Rock, Alternative	Ivory Music	
20	Di Malamang Dahilan	Room for Cielo	Indie Rock, Alternative	Ivory Music	
20	Wala Na Ba?	Iktus	Indie Rock, Alternative	Ivory Music	
20	Language	Mix Fenix	Indie pop	Ivory Music	
20	Magandang Dilag	JM Bales (feat. KVN)	Pop	—N/a	
20	Dumaloy	Sud	Indie Rock, Alternative	Warner Music Philippines	
20	Dance With You (Single)	Skusta Clee (feat. Yuri Dope)	Pop	Panty Droppaz League	
21	Songbook (Album)	Various Artist, Rico Blanco	TBA	Viva Records	
25	Negastar	Baby Blue	Pop, Hip Hop, EDM & P-pop	HHE, Japan Tower Records	
27	Love You Still (Single)	Morissette	Pop, Ballad & OPM	Underdog Music Philippines	
27	River	MNL48	Pop, Hip Hop, P-pop & J-pop	HalloHallo Entertainment	
27	GG	King Promdi feat. J-Nine	Rap, Pinoy hip hop	Def Jam Philippines	
27	Peter Pan	PHP J.O (feat. Jom of ALLMO$T)	Pop, Alternative pop & P-pop	PHP Music Entertainment	
27	holding on to tonight	Chris Sta. Romana	Pop	Enterphil Entertainment Corporation	
27	Fragments (EP)	Clara Benin	Indie Pop	Sony Music Philippines	
27	Daybreak	Leanne and Naara	Indie Pop	Warner Music Philippines	
27	The Other Side (EP)	She's Only Sixteen	Indie Rock, Alternative	Independent	
27	Yakapin Ang Pasko	Bernadette Sembrano	Indie Pop	Star Music	
27	Ikaw ang Liwanag at Ligaya	Various Artist	Pop & R&B	ABS-CBN	
30	Filthy Finishers (EP)	Us-2 Evil-0	Indie pop	Island Records Philippines	

==== December ====
Date	Album	Artist(s)	Genre(s)	Label (s)	Ref
1	Tuloy Pa Rin ang Pasko	Various Artists	Pop, R&B	TV5 Philippines	
1	Kapag Nakita Mo Na Siya	Mai Cantillano	Spoken word	Independent	
1	Puzzle	Gabba	Indie Rock, Alternative, Post Rock	Independent	
2	Friends & Family	Mayonnaise	Acoustic, Pop & R&B	Yellow Room Philippines	
4	Tuloy ang Pasko!	Various Artists	Pop, Ballad	People's Television Network (PCOO)	
4	SAAD	PHP Yuuki	Pop & R&B	PHP Music Entertainment	
4	Ayoko Na	Better Days	Indie pop	Universal Records	
4	PhilPop 2020: Music Breaking Borders	Various artists	Pop, Various genres, Bilingual	Philpop Musicfest Foundation, Warner Music Philippines	
6	Goin' Crazy	Alden Richards	Dance	GMA Music	
11	Conflicted (EP)	Claudia Barretto	Pop	Universal Records	
11	Catching Feeling – The Remixes	Iñigo Pascual, Moophs, Bimwala & J Boog	Dance, R&B & Pop	Tarsier Records	
11	Yuno	PHP JP	Rock, Hip Hop & Dance	PHP Music Entertainment	
11	Once I'm There	Carlyn Ocampo	Ballad	VIVA Records	
15	Pasko ay Magniningning	Kingdom Singers	Christmas	KJC Music, Sonshine Media Network International	
18	my love	Chris Sta. Romana	Pop	Enterphil Entertainment Corporation	
18	Self Induced Trance	Ignatius Coloma	New Wave	Enterphil Entertainment Corporation	
18	Manila Chill	Laura Sophia	Jazz	Star Music	
18	KundiRock	RJ Jacinto	Rock and roll, Kundiman, Rock, Easy Listening	Star Music	
18	Love Local OPM	Various artists	Pop, Various	UMG Recordings (MCA Music)	
22	Rainbow 2020 (Single)	South Border	R&B	VIVA Records	
23	Hashlove	MNL48	Pop & R&B	HalloHallo Entertainment	
24	You And Me	1stOne	Pop	FirstOne Entertainment	
28	Bahala Ka (Single)	MC Einstein (ft. Yuridope, Jekkpot, Flow G)	Hip Hop, Rap	Ex Battalion Music Entertainment	
30	Adlaw	PHP Chrls	Pop & R&B	PHP Music Entertainment	

== Concerts and music festivals ==
NOTE: Because of the coronavirus pandemic's start of local transmission in March 2020, all shows from March 2020 onwards were postponed or cancelled.

=== Local artists ===
Date(s)	Artist(s)	Venue	City	Event / Tour	Ref(s)
January 14	Music & Magic	Newport Performing Arts Theater	Pasay	Celebrating 40 Years: Music & Magic 2020	
January 17–18	Odette Quesada	Globe Auditorium	Taguig	Hopeless Romantic	
January 23	Hagibis; Sampaguita; Boyfriends; VST & Co.	Ayala North Vertis Tent	Quezon City	Disco Fever Manila Legends	
January 24	Sam Mangubat; JMKO; Jeremy Glinoga; Miguel Odron	Music Museum	San Juan City	Song Feels	
January 31 – February 1	Jett Pangan; Dong Abay; Basti Artadi; Wency Cornejo	Music Museum	San Juan City	90's Frontmen Acousticized	
February 1	Christian Bautista; Aicelle Santos; Mark Bautista	The Theatre at Solaire	Parañaque City	1 For 3	
February 7	Chad Borja; Rannie Raymundo; Richard Reynoso; Renz Verano; Pilita Corrales; Eva Eugenio	Music Museum	San Juan City	Sing, Love, Laugh with The OPM HITMEN	
February 9	Martin Nievera; Bituin Escalante; Arman Ferrer; Lian Kyla; Ateneo Chamber Singers; Bukas Palad Music Ministry; Hangad; Tinig Barangka Choir; ABS-CBN Philharmonic Orchestra	Meralco Theater	Pasig	All About Love	
February 14	Rachelle Ann Go	Marriot Grand Ballroom	Pasay	The Homecoming	
February 14–15	Regine Velasquez; Sarah Geronimo	Smart Araneta Coliseum	Quezon City	Unified	
February 14–15	Tetay Ocampo; Tuesday Vargas; Pekto; John Lapus; Kim Idol	Music Museum	San Juan City	Tinder Love	
February 14–21	Martin Nievera; Pops Fernandez	The Theatre at Solaire	Parañaque City	TWO-gether Again	
February 15	Juris Fernandez; Nina Girado; Ella May Saison; Luke Mejares; Ito Rapadas	PICC Plenary Hall	Pasay	Timeless Hits: All Star OPM #LOVETHROWBACK3	
February 15	Jennylyn Mercado; Dennis Trillo	New Frontier Theater	Quezon City	Co Love	
February 16	Arnel Pineda	New Frontier Theater	Quezon City	Let It Love, Let It Rock	
February 20	Ely Buendia	Newport Performing Arts Theater	Pasay	A Night at the Theater: The Repeat	
February 21	Mike Hanopol; Isko Salvador	Music Museum	San Juan City	Rock & LOL	
February 28	Sheryn Regis	Music Museum	San Juan City	Back to Love	
February 28–29	Basil Valdez; Lani Misalucha; Ryan Cayabyab	Newport Performing Arts Theater	Pasay	And the Story Begins	
February 29	Ebe Dancel; The Manila String Machine	Metrotent Convention Center	Pasig	Ebe Dancel with The Manila String Machine	

=== International artists ===
Date(s)	Artist(s)	Venue	City	Event / Tour	Ref(s)
January 10, 11	Planetshakers planetboom	Smart Araneta Coliseum	Quezon City	Planetshakers Praise Party Featuring planetboom & Planetshakers Conference Manila/Quezon City	It's The Final Conference before COVID19 Pandemic.
January 10	Eric Nam	New Frontier Theater	Quezon City	Before We Begin	
January 12	Silverstein	SM City North EDSA – SkyDome	Quezon City	20 Year Anniversary	With Special Guest Defying Decay.
January 14–15	Dave Chappelle	The Theatre at Solaire	Parañaque City	Live at Solaire	
January 15	Jo Koy	Mall of Asia Arena	Pasay	Just Kidding World Tour	
January 20	As I Lay Dying	SM City North EDSA – SkyDome	Quezon City	Shape By Fire Asia Tour 2020	With Special Guest Massacre Conspiracy.
January 25	Winner	Mall of Asia Arena	Pasay	Cross Tour	
January 25	Kim Hyun-joong	SM City North EDSA – SkyDome	Quezon City	Bio-Rhythm	
January 25	Tiffany Young	New Frontier Theater	Quezon City	Open Hearts Eve Part Two	
February 8	SEVENTEEN	Mall of Asia Arena	Pasay	Ode to You World Tour	
February 8	Pentatonix	Smart Araneta Coliseum	Quezon City	Pentatonix: The World Tour	
February 14	Boyce Avenue (Note: with December Avenue and I Belong to the Zoo.)	Waterfront Hotel and Casino	Cebu City	Live in Manila	
February 15	Boyce Avenue	SMX Convention Center – SM Lanang Premier	Davao City	Live in Manila	
February 16	Boyce Avenue	Smart Araneta Coliseum	Quezon City	Live in Manila	
February 29	NCT Dream	New Frontier Theater	Quezon City	The Dream Show	

=== Music festivals ===
Date(s)	Artist(s)	Venue	City	Festival	Ref(s)
February 2	LANY; Mandaue Nights; Three Legged Men; Sepia Times	SM Seaside City Grounds	Cebu City	Plus63 Music and Arts Festival	
February 7–8	Various hip-hop artists	Aseana City Event Grounds	Parañaque	FlipTop Festival	
February 8	Rend Collective; Citipointe Live; Gary Valenciano; IV of Spades; The Ransom Collective; Leanne and Naara; Victory Worship	Filinvest City Events Grounds	Muntinlupa	Found Music Festival 2020	
February 29 – March 1	Various Artists	La Mesa Ecopark	Quezon City	Malasimbo Music and Arts Festival: 10th Anniversary	
December 31	Various artists	Various remote locations		BYE 2020 (Note: Aired on Sky Cable freeview channel 955, and streamed via YouTube and Facebook (BYE2020))	

=== Virtual concerts ===
Date(s)	Artist(s)	Venue	City	Event / Tour	Note(s)	Ref(s)
November 28	Dua Lipa	Remote location		Studio 2054	Aired via live streaming through Smart.	

=== Canceled/postponed dates ===
Date(s)	Artist(s)	Venue	City	Event / Tour	Reasons	Ref(s)
February 19	Tony Hadley	New Frontier Theater	Quezon City	Ex Spandau Ballet	Unknown circumstances	
February 22	Gloc-9; Moonstar88; Bayang Barrios; Gary Granada; Frenchie Dy	Smart Araneta Coliseum	Quezon City	Alab ng Puso: High On Love		
March 7	Scorpions	Mall of Asia Arena	Pasay	Crazy World Tour	Travel advisories regarding the ongoing COVID-19 pandemic	
March 7–8	Various artists, including: Foals; Nick Murphy; Ben&Ben; The Paper Kites; Omar Apollo; Urbandub; Ali Gatie; Cosmo's Midnight; CRWN and August Wahh; Ysanygo; Morobe; Joji; Niki; No Rome; Phum Viphurit; IV of Spades; Stephen Day; George; ((( O ))); Flu; Banna Harbera; The Sundown	Filinvest City Event Grounds	Muntinlupa	Wanderland Music and Arts Festival (Note: Novo Amor, Sabrina Claudio, Ari Lennox and Raveena were originally slated to be part of the festival's first batch of lineup, but cancelled their performance due to travel/tour scheduling conflicts amid the ongoing of the COVID-19 virus outbreak.)	Travel advisories regarding the ongoing COVID-19 pandemic	
March 12	Jimmy Eat World	New Frontier Theater	Quezon City	Surviving: The Asia Tour	Travel advisories regarding the ongoing COVID-19 pandemic	
March 12	Ruel	Music Museum	San Juan	Free Time World Tour	Travel advisories regarding the ongoing COVID-19 pandemic	
March 13–14	Various artists	Clark Global City	Angeles, Pampanga	Aurora 2020: Clark Air Balloon Festival	Travel advisories regarding the ongoing COVID-19 pandemic	
March 14	Green Day	Mall of Asia Arena	Pasay	Live in Manila	Travel advisories regarding the ongoing COVID-19 pandemic	
March 19	SB19	Smart Araneta Coliseum	Quezon City	Give in to SB19	Travel advisories regarding the ongoing COVID-19 pandemic	
March 20–21	Ogie Alcasid; Ian Veneracion	New Frontier Theater	Quezon City	KilaboTitos	Travel advisories regarding the ongoing COVID-19 pandemic	
March 20	Yungblud	SM City North EDSA – SkyDome	Quezon City	Quezon City	Travel advisories regarding the ongoing COVID-19 pandemic	
March 20	Candy Pangilinan; Giselle Sanchez; Kim Molina	Music Museum	San Juan City	Titas of Manila	Travel advisories regarding the ongoing COVID-19 pandemic	
March 29	Slipknot	Amoranto Stadium	Quezon City	Live in Manila	Travel advisories regarding the ongoing COVID-19 pandemic	
April 2	Khalid	Mall of Asia Arena	Pasay	Free Spirit World Tour	Travel advisories regarding the ongoing COVID-19 pandemic	
April 3	Joey Generoso; Nina; Jinky Vidal; Jay Durias; Wency Cornejo; Meds Marfil; This Band; Janine Tenoso	Smart Araneta Coliseum	Quezon City	Playlist 2: The Best of OPM	Travel advisories regarding the ongoing COVID-19 pandemic	
April 4	Hyukoh	New Frontier Theater	Quezon City	2020 World Tour	Travel advisories regarding the ongoing COVID-19 pandemic	
April 6	Alanis Morissette	Mall of Asia Arena	Pasay	World Tour 2020: 25 Years of Jagged Little Pill (Note: Tentatively rescheduled on November 18–19, 2022)	Travel advisories regarding the ongoing COVID-19 pandemic	
April 14	Boys Like Girls	Sky Hall – SM Seaside City Cebu	Cebu City	Asia Tour (Note: Tentatively rescheduled on September 13–14, 2022 in Manila, and on September 15, 2022, in Cebu.)	Travel advisories regarding the ongoing COVID-19 pandemic	
April 16	Swing Out Sister	Smart Araneta Coliseum	Quezon City		Travel advisories regarding the ongoing COVID-19 pandemic	
April 16	Boys Like Girls	New Frontier Theater	Quezon City	Asia Tour	Travel advisories regarding the ongoing COVID-19 pandemic	
April 17	Various artists	Filinvest City Event Grounds	Muntinlupa	Festival of Possibilities 2020	Travel advisories regarding the ongoing COVID-19 pandemic	
April 18	Various Artists	Globe Circuit Events Ground	Makati	Chroma Music Festival: 5th Anniversary	Travel advisories regarding the ongoing COVID-19 pandemic	
April 20	Tori Kelly	New Frontier Theater	Quezon City	Inspired by True Events Tour	Travel advisories regarding the ongoing COVID-19 pandemic	
April 25	Various Artists	CCP Open Grounds	Pasay	Rakrakan Festival 2020: Peace, Love & Music	Travel advisories regarding the ongoing COVID-19 pandemic	
April 30	Dream Theater	New Frontier Theater	Quezon City	Distance Over Time Tour 2020	Travel advisories regarding the ongoing COVID-19 pandemic	
May 2	ONE OK ROCK	Smart Araneta Coliseum	Quezon City	Eye of the Storm Tour	Travel advisories regarding the ongoing COVID-19 pandemic	
May 9	Pussycat Dolls	Mall of Asia Arena	Pasay	Live in Manila	Travel advisories regarding the ongoing COVID-19 pandemic	
May 16	98 Degrees	SMX Convention Center – SM Lanang Premier	Davao City	The Philippine Tour	Travel advisories regarding the ongoing COVID-19 pandemic	
May 16	Various Artists including Iron Maiden as headliner	Mall of Asia Arena	Pasay	Pulp Summer Slam XX: Judgement Day	Travel advisories regarding the ongoing COVID-19 pandemic	
May 16	Rex Orange County	New Frontier Theater	Quezon City	The Pony Tour	Travel advisories regarding the ongoing COVID-19 pandemic	
May 20	Avril Lavigne	Smart Araneta Coliseum	Quezon City	Head Above Water World Tour (Note: Tentatively rescheduled on May 2, 2022)	Travel advisories regarding the ongoing COVID-19 pandemic	
May 21	98 Degrees	Mall of Asia Arena	Pasay	The Philippine Tour	Travel advisories regarding the ongoing COVID-19 pandemic	
May 23	98 Degrees	Waterfront Hotel and Casino	Cebu City	The Philippine Tour	Travel advisories regarding the ongoing COVID-19 pandemic	
May 27	PREP	Samsung Hall, SM Aura Premier	Taguig	Live in Manila	Travel advisories regarding the ongoing COVID-19 pandemic	
June 6	Scandal	New Frontier Theater	Quezon City	Kiss from the Darkness	Travel advisories regarding the ongoing COVID-19 pandemic	
June 10	Sarah Brightman	Smart Araneta Coliseum	Quezon City	HYMN World Tour	Travel advisories regarding the ongoing COVID-19 pandemic	
June 20	Stray Kids	Mall of Asia Arena	Pasay	District 9: Unlock	Travel advisories regarding the ongoing COVID-19 pandemic	
September 5	Billie Eilish	Mall of Asia Arena	Pasay	Where Do We Go? World Tour	Travel advisories regarding the ongoing COVID-19 pandemic	
September 6	Oh Wonder	—N/a			Travel advisories regarding the ongoing COVID-19 pandemic	
December 6	Running Man cast members	Mall of Asia Arena	Pasay	Running Man: A Decade of Laughter	Travel advisories regarding the ongoing COVID-19 pandemic	
