= List of MNL48 members =

Official Logo

MNL48 is a Filipino girl group formed in 2018 as a sister group of the Japanese idol group AKB48. The first-generation members were chosen through live auditions on the noontime show It's Showtime. On May 2, 2018, they established the current three teams: Team MII, Team NIV, and Team L. As of May 2021, the group has 45 members. Among these members are the Kenkyuusei (Japanese: 研究生), also known as Research Students.

Members who leave the group are considered "graduates" and may be given a special graduation show or concert. There are also instances where a member resigns, is dismissed, or is terminated.

Jamie Alberto and Dana Brual are the current overall captains of MNL48, with Jamie taking over from Jem Caldejón on April 26, 2025, and Dana being announced as co-captain on October 11, 2025.

== Overview ==
MNL48 has no official members. On December 15, 2022, during their MNL48 Christmas Concert, they announced the dissolution of teams and decided to group members by generations instead. Previously, they were divided into three teams. The teams were:

- Team MII (read as Team M Two) – associated with the color Golden Yellow and is the 2nd Team M in AKB48 Group after NMB48's Team M.
- Team NIV (read as Team N Four) – associated with the color Fruit Salad Green and is the 4th Team N in AKB48 Group after NMB48's Team N, SNH48's Team NII, and NGT48's Team NIII.
- Team L – associated with the color Pale Pink and is the 1st Team L in AKB48 Group's history.

The Tokyo Girls Collection Senbatsu (widely known as Trainees or Kenkyuusei) was established and existed until November 4, 2021.

== Current Lineup ==
General Election Rankings
Rank	Description
1	Center, Kami 7, and Senbatsu
2–7	Kami 7 and Senbatsu
8–16	Senbatsu
17–32	Undergirls
33–48	Next Girls
below 48	Kenkyuusei
nr	Not Ranked
dnp	Did not participate

Stage Name	Full Name	Birth date	Gen.	Election Rank			Ref.
Stage Name	Full Name	Birth date	Gen.	1 (Note: The First General Election rankings are based on overall ranks of official candidates including trainees.)	2	3 (Note: The MNL48 Third General Election are temporarily reducing to 36 members in which classifies into following ranks: Senbatsu (Ranks 1–16), Undergirls (Ranks 17–32), Reserved Undergirls (Ranks 33–36) and Kenkyuusei (Ranks 37–48).)	Ref.
Andi	Sandee Sugay Garcia	November 8, 2001 (age 25)	1st	59	48	7	
Angel	Angel Nicole Santillan	July 31, 2006 (age 20)	5th				
Charm	Charmaine Tosoc	September 7, 2001 (age 25)	3rd			39	
Chelle	Mechelle Abrio	January 9, 2005 (age 21)	4th				
CJ	Christine Joyce dela Cruz	April 24, 2001 (age 25)	3rd			48	
Cole	Ashley Nicole Tanael Somera	August 27, 2003 (age 23)	2nd (Note: Cole classified as 1.5th Generation as trainee, elevated as second generation member during the second general election.)		43	17	
Dana (cc)	Dana Leanne Evangelista Brual	September 30, 1999 (age 27)	1st	25	37	18	
Elys	María Gabrielle Elys Sabio Saluñga	February 1, 2004 (age 22)	5th				
Ira	Joey Ira Panganiban	August 17, 2005 (age 21)	4th				
Jamie (c)	Maria Jamie Beatrice Gallardo Alberto	November 12, 2001 (age 25)	2nd		6	3	
Kath	Kathlene Claire Lumbre Apduhan	August 7, 2001 (age 25)	3rd			26	
Klaryle	Klaryle Asuncion Mercado	June 20, 2002 (age 24)	3rd			28	
Line	Caroline Balendo Antero	April 22, 2004 (age 22)	4th				
Maj	Jewel Maj Magat	May 18, 2007 (age 19)	5th				
Max	Maxinne Concepcion	January 17, 2004 (age 22)	5th				
Mirai	Mirai Wanaka	September 20, 1999 (age 27)	5th				
Miyaka	Miyaka Montoro	January 21, 2003 (age 23)	5th			41	
Rachel	Rachel Frances Song Suazo	December 22, 2004 (age 21)	3rd			45	
Renee	Ma. Elise Renee Azaña	November 17, 2002 (age 23)	5th				
Rhea	Aubrey Lopez	February 16, 2002 (age 24)	3rd			44	
Rhed	Lady Jade Ambata	January 3, 2002 (age 24)	5th				
Rianna	Bhrianna Chriszell Chua	July 1, 2004 (age 22)	3rd			33	
Riri	Merc Criane Lou Capute	June 5, 2006 (age 20)	5th				
Sakura	Sakura Shion	September 2, 1999 (age 27)	5th				
Sarina	Sarina San Miguel	December 28, 2002 (age 23)	5th				
Wida	Widalyn Laurente Pateña	March 8, 2002 (age 24)	5th				
Yana	Leana Mariz Bince	March 29 (Birth year undisclosed) (Note: Yana's exact birth year is still unknown, but she revealed that she is older than Sheki, hinting that it is not later than the year 2000.)	4th				

== Former Members ==
=== 2018 Graduates ===
A total of 5 official members, all from the 1st Generation. 4 were officially graduated, and 1 resigned.

Stage Name	Full Name	Birth date	Election Rank	Status	Membership history
Stage Name	Full Name	Birth date	1	Status	Membership history
Van	Vanessa Laguisma Yap	July 21, 1997 (age 29)	30	Resigned on June 8, 2018	Team MII (May 2, 2018 – June 8, 2018)
Mae	Angelica Mae Barrientos Batocael	May 22, 2002 (age 24)	43	Resigned on June 8, 2018	Team MII (May 2, 2018 – June 8, 2018)
Trixie	Sharlene Trixie Caceres Tano	March 18, 1998 (age 28)	7	Resigned on June 8, 2018	Team MII (May 2, 2018 – June 8, 2018)
Zen	Zennae Aballe Inot	October 12, 2001 (age 25)	5	Resigned on June 8, 2018	Team NIV (May 2, 2018 – June 8, 2018)
Nina	Niña Editha Morales Guirnalda	July 27, 2002 (age 24)	70	Resigned on July 6, 2018	Kenkyuusei (April 28, 2018 – June 8, 2018); Team MII (June 8, 2018 – July 6, 2018)

=== 2019 Graduates ===
A total of 13 official members, all from the 1st Generation, left the group in 2019. 8 were outranked in the 2nd General Election, 2 resigned, 2 graduated, and 1 was dismissed.

Stage Name	Full Name	Birth date	Election Rank		Status	Membership history
Stage Name	Full Name	Birth date	1	2	Status	Membership history
Erica	Princess Erica Uyanguren Sanico	October 19, 2002 (age 24)	18	nr	Graduated on May 1, 2019	Team MII (May 2, 2018 – May 1, 2019)
Necca	Necca Lagumbay Adelan	December 15, 2001 (age 24)	42	nr	Graduated on May 1, 2019	Team MII (May 2, 2018 – May 1, 2019)
Nice	Eunys Mantes Abad	September 21, 2002 (age 24)	19	nr	Graduated on May 1, 2019	Team MII (May 2, 2018 – May 1, 2019)
Cassey	Cassandra Mae Bajolo Pestillos	January 9, 2003 (age 23)	66	nr	Graduated on May 1, 2019	Kenkyuusei (April 28, 2018 – July 9, 2018); Team MII (July 9, 2018 – May 1, 2019)
Sha	Sharei Siao Engbino	July 22, 2002 (age 24)	36	nr	Graduated on May 1, 2019	Team MII (May 2, 2018 – May 1, 2019)
Hazel	Hazel Joy Anub Marzonia	September 6, 1999 (age 27)	41	nr	Graduated on May 1, 2019	Team NIV (May 2, 2018 – May 1, 2019)
Madie	Madelaine Oidem Epilogo	April 16, 2002 (age 24)	47	nr	Graduated on May 1, 2019	Team NIV (May 2, 2018 – May 1, 2019)
Jewel	Khyan Jewel Cacapit	July 16, 2000 (age 26)	40	nr	Graduated on May 1, 2019	Team L (May 2, 2018 – May 1, 2019)
Quincy	Quincy Josiah Binalla Santillan	February 11, 2000 (age 26)	16	42	Resigned on May 23, 2019	Team L (May 2, 2018 – May 23, 2019)
Sayaka	Sayaka Anonuevo Awane	September 6, 1999 (age 27)	12	5	Graduated on June 9, 2019	Team MII (May 2, 2018 – June 9, 2019)
Ash	Ashley Cloud Santos Garcia	August 31, 1998 (age 28)	9	8	Graduated on September 15, 2019	Team L (May 2, 2018 – September 15, 2019)
Essel	Jessel Gregorio Montaos	December 17, 2000 (age 25)	31	nr	Resigned on October 7, 2019	Team MII (May 2, 2018 – May 1, 2019); Kenkyuusei (May 23, 2019 – October 7, 2019)
Cess	Princess Rabago Labay	March 30, 2002 (age 24)	48	17	Terminated on November 5, 2019	Team MII (May 2, 2018 – November 5, 2019)

=== 2020 Graduates ===
A total of 5 official members (including 9 graduating members) left the group in 2020. Most of its members applied for the Third General Election, but retired for their application.

Stage Name	Full Name	Birth date	Election Rank			Status	Membership history
Stage Name	Full Name	Birth date	1	2	3	Status	Membership history
Dani	Daniella Mae Ramos Palmero	September 20, 1999 (age 27)	69	36		Dismissed on January 13, 2020	Kenkyuusei (April 28, 2018 – April 27, 2019); Team NIV (May 2, 2019 – January 13, 2020)
Faith	Faith Shanrae Alvarez Santiago	December 7, 1999 (age 26)	13	10		Graduated on January 26, 2020 Currently as a correspondent on Congress TV since 2025.	Team MII (May 2, 2018 – January 26, 2020)
Rans	Francinne Roy Rifol	October 18, 2001 (age 25)	65	9	dnp	Graduated on October 30, 2020 (Note: Formally graduated without her graduation event.)	Kenkyuusei (April 28, 2018 – June 8, 2018); Team MII (June 8, 2018 – March 16, 2020)
Rowee	Loulle Angelyn Maagad Villaflores	May 26, 2001 (age 25)	52	16	dnp	Graduated on October 30, 2020	Kenkyuusei (April 28, 2018 – April 27, 2019); Team NIV (May 2, 2019 – March 16, 2020)
Lei	Lorraine Leigh Lacumba	August 9, 1997 (age 29)	39	45	dnp	Graduated on October 30, 2020	Team L (May 2, 2018 – March 16, 2020)
Yssa	Chelsey Yssacky Miranda Bautista	August 30, 2002 (age 24)		29	dnp	Graduated on October 30, 2020	Team L (May 2, 2019 – March 16, 2020)
Joyce	Valerie Joyce Daita	February 13, 2002 (age 24)	20	26	dnp	Graduated on October 30, 2020	Team NIV (May 2, 2018 – May 18, 2020)
Daryll	Daryll Caritativo Matalino	June 2, 2000 (age 26)	29	44	dnp	Graduated on October 30, 2020	Team NIV (May 2, 2018 – June 20, 2020)
Ecka	Ericka Joyce Madriaga Sibug	May 5, 2000 (age 26)	44	35	dnp	Graduated on October 30, 2020	Team NIV (May 2, 2018 – September 30, 2020)
Belle	Aubrey Ysabelle Badong Delos Reyes	April 17, 2001 (age 25)	23	24	dnp	Graduated on November 28, 2020	Team NIV (May 2, 2018 – November 28, 2020)
Sela	Marsela Mari Dela Cruz Guia	April 28, 2000 (age 26)	3	2	dnp	Graduated on November 29, 2020	Team L (May 2, 2018 – November 29, 2020)
Emz	Erica Maria Bacus Macabutas	March 31, 2002 (age 24)	49	33	dnp	Terminated on December 31, 2020	Kenkyuusei (April 28, 2018 – April 27, 2019); Team MII (May 2, 2019 – December 31, 2020)
Shaira	Shaira Asebias Duran	August 12, 2001 (age 25)	37	46	dnp	Terminated on December 31, 2020	Team MII (May 2, 2018 – December 31, 2020)
Shaina	Shaina Asebias Duran	August 12, 2001 (age 25)	33	47	dnp	Terminated on December 31, 2020	Team L (May 2, 2018 – December 31, 2020)

=== 2021 Graduates ===
A total of 14 official members have left the group in 2021

Stage Name	Full Name	Birth date	Election Rank			Status	Membership history
Stage Name	Full Name	Birth date	1	2	3	Status	Membership history
Aly	Jhona Alyanah Montefalcon Padillo	January 11, 2001 (age 25)	26	1	dnp	Graduated on February 6, 2021	Team NIV (May 2, 2018 – February 6, 2021); 2nd General Election's Center
Ice	Nicelle Joy Coronel Bozon	October 1, 2002 (age 24)		38	dnp	Graduated on February 6, 2021	Team L (May 2, 2019 – February 6, 2021)
Karla	Ruth Carla Mariano Dela Paz	November 25, 2002 (age 23)	67	nr	43	Graduated on February 25, 2021	Kenkyuusei (April 28, 2018 – May 1, 2019; May 7, 2019 – January 18, 2020; February 13, 2021 – February 25, 2021); Team NIV (January 18, 2020 – February 13, 2021)
Laney	Lorelaine Delos Reyes Sañosa	November 17, 2002 (age 23)	68	39	37	Graduated on February 25, 2021	Kenkyuusei (April 28, 2018 – April 27, 2019; February 13, 2021 – February 25, 2021); Team MII (May 2, 2019 – February 13, 2021)
Sam	Christina Samantha Cortan Tagana	October 15, 2003 (age 23)		nr	42	Graduated on April 20, 2021 (Note: Kenkyuusei's Kyla, Sam and Trish announced their graduation thru their social networking site. However, HHE has no official statement yet regarding their announcement.)	Kenkyuusei (May 7, 2019 – January 26, 2020; February 13, 2021 –April 20, 2021); Team MII (January 26, 2020 – February 13, 2021)
Alice	Alice Margarita Reyes De Leon	March 29, 1997 (age 29)	6	7	11	Graduated on May 21, 2021	Team MII (May 2, 2018 – May 21, 2021)
Trish	Trisha Branggan Labrador	July 16, 2001 (age 25)		nr	38	Graduated on May 21, 2021	Kenkyuusei (May 7, 2019 – August 4, 2020; February 13, 2021 – May 21, 2021); Team NIV (August 4, 2020 – February 13, 2021)
Brei	Aubrey Salvatierra Binuya	December 7, 1999 (age 26)	38	20	21	Graduated on June 29, 2021	Team NIV (May 2, 2018 – June 29, 2021)
Gabb	Gabrielle Ruedas Skribikin	August 31, 2002 (age 24)	10	12	10	Graduated on June 29, 2021	Team L (May 2, 2018 – June 29, 2021)
Nile	Anne Nicole Cortado Casitas	July 8, 1999 (age 27)		nr	36	Graduated on July 20, 2021	Kenkyuusei (May 7, 2019 – August 4, 2020); Team NIV (August 4, 2020 – July 20, 2021)
Kyla	Kyla Angelica Marie Tarong De Catalina	February 18, 2000 (age 26)	21	14	40	Graduated on August 8, 2021	Team L (May 2, 2018 – February 13, 2021); Kenkyuusei (February 13, 2021 – August 8, 2021)
Grace	Mary Grace Velasco Buenaventura	January 13, 1997 (age 29)	15	15	30	Graduated on September 25, 2021	Team L (May 2, 2018 – September 25, 2021)
Tin	Christine Ann Coralde Coloso	December 11, 2001 (age 24)	4	27	16	Graduated on September 25, 2021	Team L (May 2, 2018 – September 25, 2021)
Alyssa	Alyssa Nicole Magsino Garcia	June 30, 2000 (age 26)	17	28	20	Graduated on September 26, 2021	Team NIV (May 2, 2018 – September 26, 2021)
Thea	Althea Degillo Itona	May 8, 1998 (age 28)	45	17	15	Graduated on September 26, 2021	Team L (May 2, 2018 – September 26, 2021)
Kay	Kaede Rivera Ishiyama	November 10, 1999 (age 27)	34	23	32	Graduated on September 27, 2021	Team L (May 2, 2018 – September 27, 2021)
Jana	Jana Ross Angeles	January 7, 2000 (age 26)			29	Graduated on December 15, 2021 (Note: Removed on the roster based on their official website.)	Kenkyuusei (March 15, 2020 – February 13, 2021); Team Unknown (February 13, 2021 – December 15, 2021)

=== 2022 Graduates ===
Stage Name	Full Name	Birth date	Election Rank			Status	Membership history
Stage Name	Full Name	Birth date	1	2	3	Status	Membership history
Jan	Cristine Jan Roque Elaurza	January 5, 2001 (age 25)	24	11	6	Graduated on June 30, 2022	Team MII (May 2, 2018 – June 30, 2022); Baby Blue (September 1, 2020 – June 30, 2022)
Jaydee	Jennifer Nandy Garcia Villaruel	October 10, 2002 (age 24)	32	40	24	Graduated on July 31, 2022	Team NIV (May 2, 2018 – July 31, 2022)
Ruth	Ruther Marie Alterado Lingat	October 10, 1998 (age 28)	35	21	4	Graduated on October 1, 2022	Team NIV (May 2, 2018 – October 1, 2022)

=== 2023 Graduates ===
Stage Name	Full Name	Birth date	Election Rank			Status	Membership history
Stage Name	Full Name	Birth date	1	2	3	Status	Membership history
Abby	Abelaine Saunar Trinidad	July 31, 1997 (age 29)	2	3	1	Graduated on March 31, 2023; General Manager of MNL48	Team NIV (May 2, 2018 – March 31, 2023); 3rd General Election Center
Dian	Dian Marie Rele Mercado	June 30, 2002 (age 24)	22	32	19	Graduated on August 31, 2023	Team L (April 28, 2023 – August 31, 2023)
Gia	Guinevere Pahilanga Muse	November 13, 2000 (age 26)	28	nr	22	Graduated on August 31, 2023	Team L (April 28, 2023 – May 1, 2019); Kenkyuusei (May 7, 2019 – November 5, 2019); Team MII (November 5, 2019 – May 31, 2023)
Yzabel	Dana Yzabel Divinagracia	September 2, 2001 (age 25)		34	9	Graduated on September 17, 2023	Team MII (May 2, 2019 – September 17, 2023)

=== 2024 Graduates ===
Stage Name	Full Name	Birth date	Election Rank			Status	Membership history
Stage Name	Full Name	Birth date	1	2	3	Status	Membership history
Miho	Miho de Jesus Hoshino	October 15, 2000 (age 26)		31	25	Graduated on January 10, 2024	Team NIV (May 2, 2019 – January 10, 2024)
Princess	Princess Rius Briquillo	June 1, 1999 (age 27)	46	nr	12	Graduated on January 13, 2024	Team L (April 28, 2023 – May 1, 2019); Kenkyuusei (May 7, 2019 – June 3, 2019); Team MII (June 3, 2019 – January 13, 2024)
Coleen	Coleen Apura Trinidad	November 26, 2002 (age 23)	51	18	14	Graduated on June 8, 2024	Kenkyuusei (April 28, 2018 – June 8, 2018); Team NIV (May 2, 2019 – February 18, 2024); Baby Blue (September 1, 2020 – February 18, 2024)

=== 2025 Graduates ===
Stage Name	Full Name	Birth date	Election Rank			Status	Membership history
Stage Name	Full Name	Birth date	1	2	3	Status	Membership history
Sheki	Shekinah Igarta Arzaga	July 20, 2001 (age 25)	1	4	2	Graduated on April 26, 2025	Team MII (May 2, 2018 – February 18, 2025)
Amy	Amanda Manabat Isidto	December 18, 2002 (age 23)		25	27	Graduated on April 26, 2025	Team L (May 2, 2019 – February 18, 2025); Baby Blue (September 1, 2020 – April 26, 2025)
Ella	Ella Mae Rada Amat	October 30, 2000 (age 26)	8	nr	5	Graduated on April 26, 2025	Team NIV (May 2, 2018 – May 1, 2019); Team L (May 23, 2019 – February 18, 2025)
Frances	Francese Therese Andale Pinlac	December 31, 2003 (age 22)		nr	23	Graduated on April 26, 2025	Team L (September 6, 2019 – February 18, 2025); Baby Blue (June 30, 2022 – April 26, 2025)
Jem	Jemimah Sapuriada Caldejon	June 19, 1999 (age 27)	11	13	8	Graduated on April 26, 2025	Team NIV (May 2, 2018 – April 26, 2025)
Jie	Mheijie Calis Dela Cruz	July 16, 2001 (age 25)			46	Graduated on April 26, 2025	(May 1, 2021 – April 26, 2025)
Lyza	Allyza Mae Tinio Roxas	June 26, 2000 (age 26)			35	Graduated on April 26, 2025	(May 1, 2021 – April 26, 2025)
Mari	Mariz Mapesos Iyog	October 14, 2002 (age 24)	27	30	34	Graduated on April 26, 2025	Team L (May 2, 2018 –July 20, 2021) (August 26, 2022 – April 26, 2025)
Lara	Lara Mae Agan Layar	December 20, 1999 (age 26)	14	22	13	Graduated on July 22, 2025	Team NIV (May 2, 2018 – July 22, 2025)
Klaire	Klaire Hugh Presno	January 24, 2002 (age 24)		41	31	Graduated on October 24, 2025	Team MII (May 2, 2019 – October 24, 2025)

== Former Understudies ==
Former Kenkyuusei or Trainees who never been promoted. 15 from 1st Generation (12 of them resigned in 2018 and 3 in 2019) and 1 from 2nd Generation.

Stage Name	Full Name	Birth date	Election Rank			Notes
Stage Name	Full Name	Birth date	1	2	3	Notes
Celine	Celinedion Dionisio	January 13, 1999 (age 27)	56			Resigned on April 30, 2018
Reiko	Kleif Guillian Almeda	October 27, 2000 (age 26)	57			Resigned on April 30, 2018
Reina	Kyle Gullian Almeda	October 27, 2000 (age 26)	58			Resigned on April 30, 2018
Nix	Nica Mae Onde Fortuno	January 2, 2002 (age 24)	61			Resigned on April 30, 2018
Ann	Sherry Ann Bueza Rebadulla	June 18, 2001 (age 25)	54			Resigned on April 30, 2018
Kana	Karina Dannah Delos Santos Vital	May 14, 2002 (age 24)	55			Resigned on May 2, 2018
Arol	Carol Semillia Reyes	August 24, 2000 (age 26)	50			Resigned on May 2, 2018
Ikee	Micaella Joy Salas Yabut	April 13, 2000 (age 26)	64			Resigned on May 16, 2018
Vern	Vemberneth Daray Villanueva	June 16, 2002 (age 24)	63			Resigned on July 2, 2018
Niah	Sheccaniah Faith Saludares Baler	May 3, 2000 (age 26)	53			Resigned on November 7, 2018
Eda	Edralyn Lozada Tocop	April 10, 1997 (age 29)	71			Resigned on December 12, 2018
Vira	Edelvira Jallorina Bandong	November 25, 2000 (age 25)	60	nr		Graduated on May 1, 2019
Yna	Polaris Yna Casipong Salazar	February 14, 2002 (age 24)	72	nr		Graduated on May 1, 2019
Mela	Jamela Magracia Magbanlac	May 16, 2001 (age 25)	62	nr		Resigned on October 7, 2019
Jean	Je-ann Benette Lazatin Guinto	June 2, 2003 (age 23)		nr		Resigned on October 7, 2019
Rain	Lorraine Pingol	October 19, 2004 (age 22)			47	Resigned on November 4, 2021

== Former Candidates/Aspirants ==
Former MNL48 Candidates and Aspirants (Withdrew candidacy/didn't rank)

=== First Generation ===
Stage Name	Full Name	Birth date	Notes
Kris	Alliah Kristel Anne Torrejos	December 10, 2002 (age 23)	Withdrew as a challenger on April 27, 2018
Aria	Aria Gilead Carino	November 23, 1997 (age 28)	Withdrew as a candidate on April 27, 2018
Eunice	Eunice Diane Santiago	September 4, 1997 (age 29)	Withdrew as a candidate on April 27, 2018

=== Second Generation ===
Stage Name	Full Name	Birth date	Notes
Gail	Abbigail Shaine de Guzman Reyes	January 4, 2003 (age 23)	2nd Generation candidate
Alex	Alexie Iris Bulanhagui Dimaayo	July 1, 2003 (age 23)	2nd Generation candidate
Sandra	Alyssandra Corpuz Corteza	April 12, 2002 (age 24)	2nd Generation candidate
Isylle	Chrisylle Joy Gelvero Mondejar	February 7, 2003 (age 23)	2nd Generation candidate
Ara	Karla Jane delos Reyes Tolentino	June 21, 2001 (age 25)	2nd Generation candidate
Ish	Missy Perez Ainza	February 28, 2002 (age 24)	2nd Generation candidate
Naomi	Naomi Roniele Pile De Guzman	July 8, 1998 (age 28)	2nd Generation candidate
Sun	Shay Anne Co Enciso	September 21, 2001 (age 25)	2nd Generation candidate

=== Third Generation ===
Stage Name	Full Name	Birth date	Notes
Ruby	Querubin Gonzalez	January 23, 2003 (age 23)	Withdrew as a candidate on March 24, 2020
Yiesha	Yiesha Amera Ungad	January 20, 2003 (age 23)	Withdrew as a candidate on May 29, 2020
Jelay	Jillian Shane Pilones	February 13, 2001 (age 25)	Removed as a candidate on October 31, 2020
Glaze	Glaciana Marie Reyes Pelagio	May 12, 2002 (age 24)	3rd Generation candidate
Jash	Jashmin Iballo	July 10, 2003 (age 23)	3rd Generation candidate

== Captaincy history ==
=== Overall captain ===
MNL48 Overall Captain
No.	Stage Name	Full Name	Birth date	Team/ Gen.	Date of Tenure	Length (days)
1	Alice	Alice Margarita Reyes de Leon	March 29, 1998 (age 28)	MII	May 5, 2018 – March 17, 2021	1,047
2	Sheki	Shekinah Igarta Arzaga	July 20, 2000 (age 26)	MII	March 17, 2021 – December 15, 2022	1,179
2	Sheki	Shekinah Igarta Arzaga	July 20, 2000 (age 26)	1st	December 15, 2022 – June 8, 2024	1,179
3	Jem	Jemimah Sapuriada Caldejon	June 19, 1999 (age 27)	1st	June 8, 2024 – April 26, 2025	322
4	Jamie	Maria Jamie Beatrice Gallardo Alberto	November 12, 2001 (age 25)	2nd	April 26, 2025 – May 20, 2026	566
5	Dana (cc)	Dana Leanne Evangelista Brual	September 30, 1999 (age 27)	1st	October 11, 2025 – May 20, 2026	398

=== Defunct captain ===
MNL48 Generation Captains
First Generation Captain
No.	Stage Name	Full Name	Birth date	Date of Tenure	Length (days)
1	Jem	Jemimah Sapuriada Caldejon	June 19, 1999 (age 27)	December 15, 2022 – present	1,429
Second Generation Captain
No.	Stage Name	Full Name	Birth date	Date of Tenure	Length (days)
1	Yzabel	Dana Yzabel Divinagracia	September 2, 2001 (age 25)	December 15, 2022 – September 17, 2023	276
–	Vacant			September 17, 2023 – present	1,153
Third Generation Captain
No.	Stage Name	Full Name	Birth date	Date of Tenure	Length (days)
1	Lyza	Allyza Mae Roxas	June 26, 2000 (age 26)	December 15, 2022 – present	1,429

MNL48 Team Captains
Team MII Captain
No.	Stage Name	Full Name	Birth date	Date of Tenure	Length (days)
1	Alice	Alice Margarita Reyes de Leon	March 29, 1998 (age 28)	May 3, 2018 – May 21, 2021	1,114
–	Vacant			May 21, 2021 – December 15, 2022	573
Team disbanded since December 15, 2022 (1,429 days)
Team NIV Captain
No.	Stage Name	Full Name	Birth date	Date of Tenure	Length (days)
1	Ecka	Ericka Joyce Madriaga Sibug	May 5, 2000 (age 26)	May 4, 2018 – September 30, 2020	880
–	Vacant			September 30, 2020 – December 15, 2022	806
Team disbanded since December 15, 2022 (1,429 days)
Team L Captain
No.	Stage Name	Full Name	Birth date	Date of Tenure	Length (days)
1	Kay	Kaede Rivera Ishiyama	November 10, 1999 (age 27)	May 5, 2018 – September 23, 2021	1,241
–	Vacant			September 27, 2021 – December 15, 2022	448
Team disbanded since December 15, 2022 (1,429 days)
Kenkyuusei Captain
No.	Stage Name	Full Name	Birth date	Date of Tenure	Length (days)
1	Arol	Carol Semillia Reyes	August 24, 2000 (age 26)	May 2, 2018 – May 16, 2018	14
2	Andi	Sandee Sugay Garcia	November 8, 2001 (age 25)	May 16, 2018 – June 8, 2018	23
3	Emz	Erica Maria Bacus Macabutas	March 31, 2002 (age 24)	June 8, 2018 – May 1, 2019	327
–	Vacated			May 1, 2019 – May 7, 2019	6
4	Karla	Ruth Carla Mariano Dela Paz	November 25, 2002 (age 23)	May 7, 2019 – January 17, 2020	255
Team disbanded since January 17, 2020 (2,492 days)
