= Sela Guia =

Filipino singer and actress (born 2000)

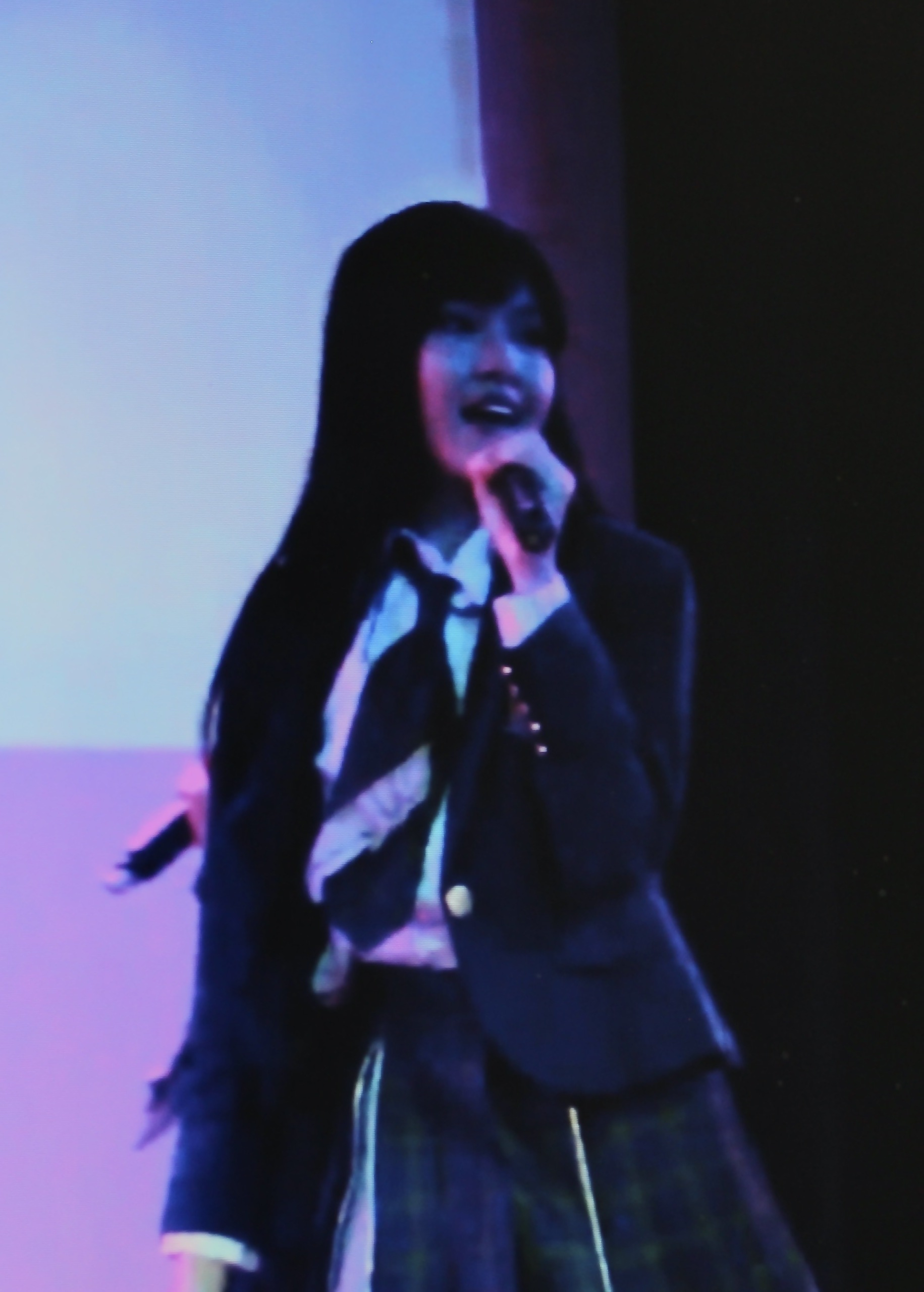
- Sela at Idol Matsuri 2018
- Born: Marsela Mari Dela Cruz Guia; April 28, 2000 (age 26); Biñan, Laguna, Philippines
- Education: St. Paul University Manila
- Occupations: Host; singer; actress
- Family: Miguel Mari Guia (Mister International Philippines 2016)
- Musical career
- Genre: Pop
- Instrument: Vocals
- Years active: 2018–present
- Label: ABS-CBN (Star); Star Magic
- Formerly of: MNL48 (2018–2020)

Marsela Mari "Sela" Dela Cruz Guia (born April 28, 2000) is a Filipino actress, host and singer who is under ABS-CBN's Star Magic. She is a former member of the all-girl Filipino idol group MNL48. After leaving the group, she signed an exclusive contract with Star Magic in their historic "Black Pen Day" on June 19, 2021. Sela has since then continued with her solo singing and acting career. Starting May 2022, Guia became a regular host on PIE Channel's segment PIEsilog and was later on moved to PIEnalo: Pinoy Games.

== Career ==
=== As a member of MNL48 ===
Sela was born in Biñan, Laguna, Philippines. At the age of 17, she became a member of MNL48's first generation, which was composed of 48 members and debuted in April 2018.

In 2017, Sela submitted an audition clip online in the nationwide search for the members of AKB48's Filipino sister group MNL48. From a total of 4,134 active applicants, she was one of the 200 girls that passed the initial auditions, which was announced on It's Showtime last January 2018. In April 2018, She ranked third in the first edition of MNL48's general election. As a result, she was a front line performer for the group's debut single,"Aitakatta – Gustong Makita". A month later, she was selected as one of the members of Team L. The following year, she was selected to perform in AKB48 Group Asia Festival in Bangkok, Thailand on January 27, 2019. In April 2019, Sela placed second during the second edition of MNL48's general election, for the group's 4th single, "Ikaw ang Melody". The following month, the Music Video for Igai ni Mango was released in where Sela was center. Later that year, she was selected to perform in AKB48 Group Asia Festival in Shanghai, China on August 24, 2019.

In November 2020, during her Instagram live, Sela formally announced that she will withdraw her candidacy from the third edition of MNL48's General Election and later leave the group. After her duties and responsibilities she formally left February the next year, making River her last single as a member of the group.

=== Solo career ===
On June 19, 2021, a few months after leaving MNL48, Sela signed an exclusive contract with Star Magic on their historic "Black Pen Day". Since then, she has been participating in a lot of Star Magic's gigs and started doing workshops with them. In January 2020, Sela appeared on ASAP Natin ‘To stage for a Star Magic Presents performance, marking the start of her solo career. She also appeared in the "Star Magic 30 All-Star Games" as part of the Star Hunt Volleyball Team last May 23, 2022. On the same month, Sela started her hosting career after the announcement that she will be part of PIE Channel's segment PIEsilog as a PIE jock (host), together with Frances Cabatuando, Tristan Ramirez, Raco Ruiz, Jae Miranda, and Eryka Lucas. In October 2022, Sela was moved to a new segment PIEnalo:Pinoy Games together with Eian Rances, Negi, Kevin Montillano, Nicki Morena, Ruth Paga, and Nonong Ballinan. On November 27, 2022, Sela became a guest host on the Dream Maker Online Hub with Sheena Belarmino.

Starting January 9, 2023, Sela, together with Jhai Ho and Gabb Skribikin will be the Dream Maker Pie Jocks on Dream Maker's weekdays variety show Pause & Play on PIE Channel.

=== Acting career ===
On June 14, 2020, Sela made her television debut when she starred in Ipaglaban Mo!: Yes Sir as Tiffany.

In February 2022, it was announced that Sela will play the role of Nica in the TVDG digital movie PILIkula: "Her Story" with Ella Cayabyab, and Sky Quizon. They've won the role via the KUMU campaign spearheaded by Star Hunt. This is her second TVDG digital movie after "2020 Vision" where she played Erika back in 2020, co-starring Ecka Sibug as Sandy. Earlier that year she also played the role of Marnie in the iWant Series "Goodbye Girl", which served as her web series debut. In July 2022, Sela made a quick appearance in the film "The Entitled" starring Alex Gonzaga and JC de Vera. It is her first appearance on Netflix and her third appearance in the big screen after her cameo scene in "Kun Maupay Man It Panahon" last 2021 and the documentary film about MNL48, ICYMI: I See Me last 2019.

In 2023, Sela starred in her first major film casting as Jenny Mendoza, a supporting role in Melai Cantiveros' Ma'am Chief: Shakedown in Seoul.

== Early life and education ==
Guia was born in Laguna, Philippines. Ever since young, Guia has always been keen into becoming a dancer, singer, and an actress. She graduated from St. Paul University Manila, with a bachelor's degree in tourism management with high honors.

== Works ==
=== Discography ===
==== Collaboration ====
Year	Title	Role	With	Notes	Ref(s)
2021	"Iba Ang Pinoy"	Featured Artist	Julia Serad, Jeremy Glinoga, Fatima Louise, Jason Dy, Zendee Tenerefe, JMKO, Vanya Aguirre, Zion Castor	A song about COVID-19, produced by Condura Philippines.	

==== MNL48 ====
Year	No.	Album title	Role	Notes	Ref(s)
2018	1	"Aitakatta – Gustong Makita"	A-side	Ranked 3rd in 2018 General Election, also sang "Talulot ng Sakura" and "Umiindak na Saya"	
2018	2	"Pag-ibig Fortune Cookie"	A-side	Also sang "First Rabbit"	
2019	3	"365 Araw ng Eroplanong Papel"	A-side	Centered "Igai ni Mango " and sang "Bingo"	
2019	4	"Ikaw ang Melody"	A-side	Ranked 2nd in 2019 General Election, also sang "So Long"	
2020	5	"High Tension"	A-side	Also sang "Green Flash"	
2020	6	"River"	A-side	Didn't participate in the 2021 General Election, and her last single as a member of MNL48	

=== Filmography ===
==== Films and Series ====
Year	Title	Role	Director(s)	Type	Notes	Ref(s)
2019	ICYMI: I See Me	Herself	Carlo Francisco Manatad	Documentary film	Documentary film about MNL48	
2020	MNL48 Presents: 2020 Vision	Erika	Karl Justin Martin	Short film	Lead role	
2020	Ipaglaban Mo!: Yes Sir	Tiffany	Jaime Habac Jr.	Legal anthology show	TV debut	
2021	Kun Maupay Man It Panahon	Fighting woman	Carlo Francisco Manatad	Film	Cameo	
2022	The Goodbye Girl	Marnie	Derick Cabrido	iWant TFC mini web series	Web series debut	
2022	PILIKula: Her Story	Nica	Sonny Calvento	Film	Lead role	
2022	The Entitled	Caitlyn's Friend	Theodore Boborol	Film	Cameo	
2023	Ma'am Chief: Shakedown in Seoul	Jenny Mendoza	Kring Kim	Film	Supporting role	

==== Television shows ====
===== As a member of MNL48 =====
Year	Title	Role	Notes	Ref(s)
2018	It's Showtime	Guest		
2018	ASAP Natin 'To	Guest		
2018	Umagang Kay Ganda	Guest		
2018	Letters And Music	Guest		
2019	Myx Live!	Guest		
2019	iWant ASAP	Guest		
2020	Magandang Buhay	Guest		
2020	Pinoy Big Brother: Connect	Guest		

===== As a solo artist =====
Year	Title	Role	Notes	Ref(s)
2022	ASAP Natin To	Guest	First appearance as Star Magic artist	
2022	PIEsilog	PIE Jock	Host	
2022–2023	PIEnalo:Pinoy Games	PIE Jock	Host	
2023	Dream Maker: Pause & Play	Dream Maker PIE Jock	Host	

==== Web shows ====
===== As a member of MNL48 =====
Year	Title	Role	Note	Ref(s)
2018	MNLife	Guest		
2018	MNLaugh	Guest		
2018	MNL48 I-School	Guest		
2019	MNL48 Interactive Live	Host		
2019	MNL48 KUMU Live Interaction	Host		
2019	iWant ASAP	Guest		
2020	Kapamilya Chat	Guest	For 2020 Vision, with Ecka Sibug	
2020	It's showtime Online	Guest	For 2020 Vision, with Ecka Sibug	

===== As a solo artist =====
Year	Title	Role	Note	Ref(s)
2021	News ‘To Ko Yan	Guest	also on KUMU	
2021	The Star Magic Christmas Special 2021	Host and performer		
2022	Starkada Prom Night	Guest	For Her Story	
2022	It's showtime Online	Guest	For Her Story	
2022	Kapamilya Chat	Guest	For Her Story	
2022	Kapamilya Chat	Guest	For PIEchannel	
2022	Dude-It-Yourself	Resident DIYer	Let's Build A Box	
2022	Dude-It-Yourself	Resident DIYer	Love Yourshelf by Building a Shelf	
2022	Dude-It-Yourself	Resident DIYer	Metalworking 101	
2022	Dude-It-Yourself	Resident DIYer	Basic Wood Finishing	
2022	Dude-It-Yourself	Resident DIYer	Desktop Monitor Riser	
2022	PIEsilog	PIE jock	Host	
2022	PIEnalo:Pinoy Games	PIE jock	Host	
2022	Dream Maker Online Hub	Guest Host	With Sheena Belarmino	
2023	Dream Maker: Pause & Play	Dream Maker PIE Jock	Host	
