= Koi Suru Fortune Cookie =

2013 single by AKB48

"Koisuru Fortune Cookie"
- Type-A single cover

Single by AKB48

from the album Tsugi no Ashiato
- B-side: Ai no Imi o Kangaete Mita; Kondo Koso Ecstasy; Suitei Marmalade; Namida no Sei Janai; Saigo no Door
- Released: August 21, 2013 (Single); October 1, 2016 (HMV Vinyl)
- Genre: J-pop, disco
- Length: 4:47
- Label: You, Be Cool! / King
- Composer: Shintarō Itō
- Lyricist: Yasushi Akimoto
- Producer: Yasushi Akimoto

AKB48 singles chronology
"Sayonara Crawl" (2013)	"Koisuru Fortune Cookie" (2013)	"Heart Electric" (2013)

Music video
- "Koi Suru Fortune Cookie" on YouTube

"Koi Suru Fortune Cookie" (恋するフォーチュンクッキー, Koisuru Fōchunkukkī; "The Fall-in-Love Fortune Cookie") is the 32nd single by the Japanese idol girl group AKB48. It was released in Japan on August 21, 2013. The single contains graduation songs for Mariko Shinoda and Tomomi Itano.

The song has been recorded by AKB48's international sister groups in their respective local languages, including the Indonesian version by JKT48, released on the same date as the original Japanese version; the Chinese Mandarin version by SNH48, released in 2013; the Thai version by BNK48, released in 2017; and the Filipino version by MNL48, released in 2018; and the Vietnamese version by SGO48, released in December 2019.

== 2013 general election ==
The lineup for the title track and supporting B-sides was determined by the results from the AKB48's 2013 general election. Rino Sashihara of HKT48 received the most votes and became the center, or headlining position, for the single. This is Sashihara's first time as a center for an AKB48 single.

The participants in the single included members who had graduated or announced graduation plans. AKB48 member Mariko Shinoda, who placed fifth overall in the election, announced on the election results day that she would be graduating; her ceremony was held on July 21. Tomomi Itano, who placed 11th overall, had announced her intent to graduate back in February 2013. Natsumi Hirajima, a candidate who had already graduated prior to the election voting period, placed 62nd overall.

== Promotion and release ==
On June 23, AKB48 member Rino Sashihara announced on Fuji TV's late-night show, AKB Eizou Center, that the title of the 32nd single would be "Koi Suru Fortune Cookie" and a release date of August 21.

The single was released in four versions: Type A, Type K, Type B and Theater Edition. The non-theater versions have limited editions for their first pressings. While each regular edition has one of 50 different kinds of photos, each limited edition has one of two types of tickets for a handshake event.

The title song was first performed in the TBS show "Ongaku no hi" (Japanese: 音楽の日) on June 29.

== Music video ==
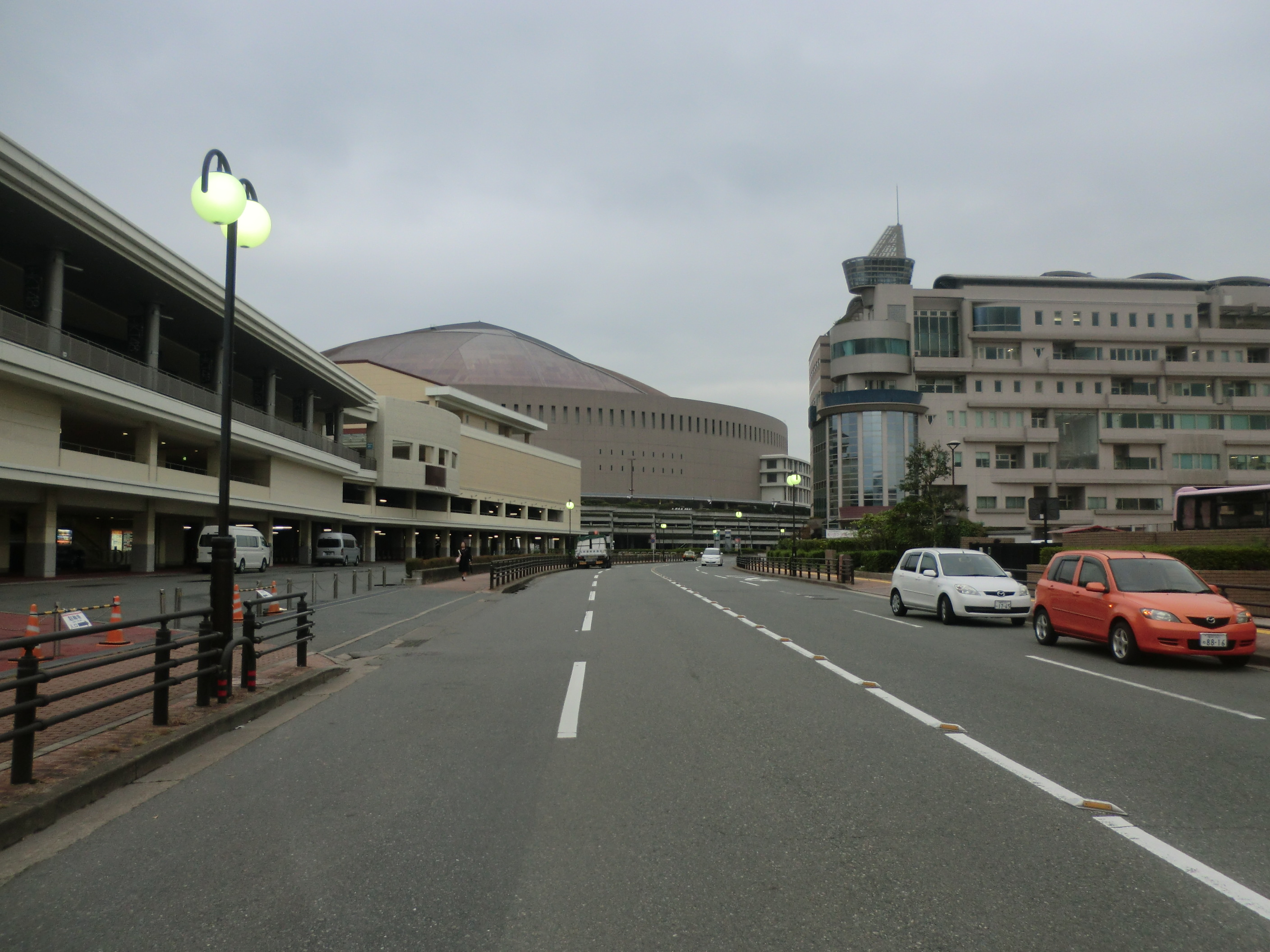
Street in front of HKT48 theatre, one of filming points of the music video

The "Koi Suru Fortune Cookie" music video was filmed on June 22, in Fukuoka, HKT48's home and where AKB48 member Mariko Shinoda is from. It involved 3,800 extras, the most for any AKB48 and sister group-related video since "Banzai Venus" which had about 1,000 people.

The choreography was done by Papaya Suzuki. Some of the AKB48 members commented on the music video. Mayu Watanabe said "It makes you feel like telling your fortunes". Tomomi Itano said "It's a song you can liven up with everyone, and is also an enjoyable song, as you can copy the choreography with others." Minami Takahashi said "It's somehow nostalgic. It's like a large-scale disco."

On July 19, AKB48 released the Staff Version of the music video, which shows 365 members of the AKB48 staff and its sister groups performing some of the dance moves. The video was shot in seven days. The staff video was listed as the most watched YouTube video in Japan for the 2013 year with over 8 million views.

On August 12, 2016 the music video reached 100 million views on YouTube, the second AKB48 music video to achieve this milestone (along with "Heavy Rotation"). This made AKB48 the first Japanese artist to have two music videos with over 100 million views on YouTube.

== Live performances and other use ==
In March 2014, "Koi Suru Fortune Cookie" was listed as one of the songs on the Japanese game Just Dance Wii U

In 2013 the YouTuber Ayako Suzukawa recorded herself performing to "Koi Suru Fortune Cookie" at every one of the Keikyu railway stations. "Koi Suru Fortune Cookie" has been used as the departure melody on the Tokyo Metro Hibiya Line platforms of Akihabara Station from spring 2016.

In Weathering With You, Hina, Hodaka and Nagisa sing this song via the karaoke machine in their hotel room.

- 64th NHK Kōhaku Uta Gassen, performed as a song of Kōhaku 2013 special: AKB48 Festival.
- 66th NHK Kōhaku Uta Gassen, performed as a song of AKB Kouhaku 2015 SP ~10th Anniversary~, with the Graduated members, include Atsuko Maeda and Yuko Oshima.
- 69th NHK Kōhaku Uta Gassen, performed with Thai group BNK48.
- 70th NHK Kōhaku Uta Gassen, performed as ~Kōhaku World Selection SP~ with AKB48 Group.

In 2017, "Koi Suru Fortune Cookie" was performed along with "Heavy Rotation" at 2017 Mnet Asian Music Awards in Japan.

== Track listing ==
=== Type A ===
CD
No.	Title	Performance	Length
1.	"Koi Suru Fortune Cookie" (恋するフォーチュンクッキー)		4:47
2.	"Ai no Imi o Kangaete Mita" (愛の意味を考えてみた)	Under Girls (アンダーガールズ)	3:06
3.	"Kondo Koso Ecstasy" (今度こそエクスタシー)	Next Girls (ネクストガールズ)	3:21
4.	"Koi Suru Fortune Cookie off vocal ver." (恋するフォーチュンクッキー off vocal ver.)		4:47
5.	"Ai no Imi o Kangaete Mita off vocal ver." (愛の意味を考えてみた off vocal ver.)		3:06
6.	"Kondo Koso Ecstasy off vocal ver." (今度こそエクスタシー off vocal ver.)		3:19

DVD
No.	Title	Length
1.	"Koi Suru Fortune Cookie Music Video" (恋するフォーチュンクッキー Music Video)
2.	"Koi Suru Fortune Cookie Choreography Type A" (恋するフォーチュンクッキー 振り付け映像 Type A)
3.	"Ai no Imi o Kangaete Mita Music Video" (愛の意味を考えてみた Music Video)
4.	"Kondo Koso Ecstasy Music Video" (今度こそエクスタシー Music Video)
5.	"SF shojo drama series ADS77 part 1" (SF 少女ドラマシリーズ「ADS77」：第一幕 ナナという姉)

=== Type K ===
CD
No.	Title	Performance	Length
1.	"Koi Suru Fortune Cookie" (恋するフォーチュンクッキー)		4:47
2.	"Ai no Imi o Kangaete Mita" (愛の意味を考えてみた)	Under Girls (アンダーガールズ)	3:06
3.	"Suitei Marmalade" (推定マーマレード)	Future Girls (フューチャーガールズ)	4:41
4.	"Koi Suru Fortune Cookie off vocal ver." (恋するフォーチュンクッキー off vocal ver.)		4:47
5.	"Ai no Imi o Kangaete Mita off vocal ver." (愛の意味を考えてみた off vocal ver.)		3:06
6.	"Suitei Marmalade off vocal ver." (推定マーマレード off vocal ver.)		4:40

DVD
No.	Title	Length
1.	"Koi Suru Fortune Cookie Music Video" (恋するフォーチュンクッキー Music Video)
2.	"Koi Suru Fortune Cookie Choreography Type K" (恋するフォーチュンクッキー 振り付け映像 Type K)
3.	"Ai no Imi o Kangaete Mita Music Video" (愛の意味を考えてみた Music Video)
4.	"Suitei Marmalade Music Video" (推定マーマレード Music Video)
5.	"SF shojo drama series ADS77 part 2" (SF少女ドラマシリーズ「ADS77」：第二幕 廃棄)

=== Type B ===
CD (Note: The Type-B version numbering is from the AKB48 official website discography. The King Records website has different sequence numbering as of August 4, 2013.)
No.	Title	Length
1.	"Koi Suru Fortune Cookie" (恋するフォーチュンクッキー)	4:47
2.	"Saigo no Door (Tomomi Itano's graduation song)" (最後のドア(板野友美卒業ソング))	4:22
3.	"Namida no Sei Janai (Mariko Shinoda's graduation song)" (涙のせいじゃない（篠田麻里子卒業ソング）)	5:27
4.	"Koi Suru Fortune Cookie off vocal ver." (恋するフォーチュンクッキー off vocal ver.)	4:47
5.	"Saigo no Door off vocal ver." (最後のドア off vocal ver.)	4:22
6.	"Namida no Sei Janai off vocal ver." (涙のせいじゃない off vocal ver.)	5:25

DVD
No.	Title	Length
1.	"Koi Suru Fortune Cookie Music Video" (恋するフォーチュンクッキー Music Video)
2.	"Koi Suru Fortune Cookie Choreography Type B" (恋するフォーチュンクッキー 振り付け映像 Type B)
3.	"Saigo no Door Music Video" (最後のドア Music Video)
4.	"Namida no Sei Janai Music Video" (涙のせいじゃない Music Video)
5.	"SF shojo drama series ADS77 part 3" (SF少女ドラマシリーズ「ADS77」：第三幕 降霊)

=== Theater ===
CD
No.	Title	Performance	Length
1.	"Koi Suru Fortune Cookie" (恋するフォーチュンクッキー)
2.	"Ai no Imi o Kangaete Mita" (愛の意味を考えてみた)	Under Girls (アンダーガールズ)
3.	"Aozora Cafe" (青空カフェ)
4.	"Koi Suru Fortune Cookie off vocal ver." (恋するフォーチュンクッキー off vocal ver.)
5.	"Ai no Imi o Kangaete Mita off vocal ver." (愛の意味を考えてみた off vocal ver.)
6.	"Aozora Cafe" (青空カフェ off vocal ver.)

== Personnel ==
=== "Koisuru Fortune Cookie" ===
The lineup for the title track consists of the top 16 members from AKB48's 2013 general election.

The number in brackets indicates the member's ranking.
Center: Rino Sashihara (1)

- Team A: Mariko Shinoda (5), Minami Takahashi (8), Yui Yokoyama (13), Mayu Watanabe (3)
- Team K: Tomomi Itano (11), Yuko Oshima (2)
- Team B: Yuki Kashiwagi (4), Haruna Kojima (9), Haruka Shimazaki (12)
- Team S (SKE48) / Team K: Jurina Matsui (6)
- Team KII (SKE48): Akari Suda (16)
- Team E (SKE48): Rena Matsui (7)
- Team N (NMB48) / Team B: Miyuki Watanabe (15)
- Team N (NMB48): Sayaka Yamamoto (14)
- Team H (HKT48): Rino Sashihara (1)
- SNH48: Sae Miyazawa (10)

=== "Ai no Imi o Kangaete Mita" ===
Performed by Undergirls, which consist of members who ranked 17 to 32 in AKB48's 2013 general election.
The number in brackets indicates the member's ranking.
Center: Aya Shibata (17)

- Team A: Anna Iriyama (30), Rina Kawaei (25)
- Team K: Rie Kitahara (21)
- Team B: Ayaka Umeda (19), Reina Fujie (32)
- Kenkyuusei: Minami Minegishi (18)
- Team S (SKE48): Masana Oya (29), Yuria Kizaki (22)
- Team KII (SKE48): Aya Shibata (17), Akane Takayanagi (23), Airi Furukawa (27)
- Team E (SKE48): Kanon Kimoto (31)
- Kenkyuusei (SKE48): Kaori Matsumura (24)
- Team M (NMB48): Nana Yamada (28)
- Team H (HKT48): Sakura Miyawaki (26)
- Team J (JKT48) / Team B: Aki Takajo (20)

=== "Kondo Koso Ecstasy" ===
Performed by Next Girls, which consist of members who ranked 33 to 48 in AKB48's 2013 general election.
The number in brackets indicates the member's ranking.
Center: Amina Sato (33)

- Team A: Yuka Tano (38)
- Team K: Asuka Kuramochi (36), Amina Sato (33), Mariya Nagao (35), Tomu Muto (45)
- Team B: Haruka Ishida (46), Haruka Katayama (34)
- Team B / Team KII (SKE48): Mina Ōba (48)
- Team S (SKE48): Makiko Saito (42)
- Team KII (SKE48): Ami Kobayashi (47), Rina Matsumoto (41)
- Team E (SKE48): Madoka Umemoto (39)
- Team M (NMB48) / Team A: Fuuko Yagura (44)
- Team N (NMB48): Kei Jonishi (40)
- Team H (HKT48): Aika Oota (43), Haruka Kodama (37)

=== "Suitei Marmalade" ===
Performed by Future Girls, which consist of members who ranked 49 to 64 in AKB48's 2013 general election.
The number in brackets indicates the member's ranking.
Center: Shu Yabushita (49)

- Team A: Ayaka Kikuchi (singer) (51), Sumire Sato (52), Sakiko Matsui (60)
- Team K: Ami Maeda (53)
- Team B: Misaki Iwasa (56), Suzuran Yamauchi (61)
- Team B / Team N (NMB48): Miori Ichikawa (57)
- Team S (SKE48): Kyoka Isohara (58), Yuka Nakanishi (64)
- Team E (SKE48): Shiori Kaneko (63)
- Team N (NMB48): Mayu Ogasawara (54), Akari Yoshida (50)
- Team BII (NMB48): Shu Yabushita (49)
- Kenkyuusei (HKT48): Meru Tashima (55), Mio Tomonaga (59)
- Graduated member: Natsumi Hirajima (62)

=== "Namida no Sei Janai" ===
Graduation Song of Mariko Shinoda.

- Team A: Mariko Shinoda, Minami Takahashi, Yui Yokoyama, Mayu Watanabe
- Team K: Tomomi Itano, Yuko Oshima
- Team B: Yuki Kashiwagi, Haruna Kojima, Haruka Shimazaki
- Kenkyuusei: Minami Minegishi
- Team S (SKE48) / Team K: Jurina Matsui
- Team H (HKT48): Rino Sashihara
- SNH48: Sae Miyazawa

=== "Saigo no Door" ===
Graduation Song for Tomomi Itano.

- Team A: Mariko Shinoda, Minami Takahashi, Yui Yokoyama, Mayu Watanabe
- Team K: Tomomi Itano, Yuko Oshima
- Team B: Yuki Kashiwagi, Haruna Kojima, Haruka Shimazaki
- Kenkyuusei: Minami Minegishi
- Team S (SKE48) / Team K: Jurina Matsui
- Team H (HKT48): Rino Sashihara
- SNH48: Sae Miyazawa

== Charts ==
"Koi Suru Fortune Cookie" sold 1,095,894 copies on its first day of release, and reached number one on the Oricon weekly charts with over 1.33 million copies. This makes the group's 13th consecutive single to sell over a million copies, which ties a record with B'z. It is the group's 19th consecutive number-one single.

=== Weekly charts ===
Chart (2013)	Peak position
Japan Hot 100 (Billboard)	1
Japan (Oricon)	1
Taiwan (G-Music)	12

=== Monthly chart ===
Chart (2013)	Peak position
Oricon Monthly Chart	1

=== Year-end charts ===
Chart (2013)	Position
Billboard Japan Hot 100	1
Billboard Japan Hot Singles Sales	2
Oricon Singles Chart	2

== Certifications ==
Region	Certification	Certified units/sales
Japan (RIAJ) Physical single	Million	1,000,000^{^}
Japan (RIAJ) Digital single	Million	1,000,000^{*}
^{*} Sales figures based on certification alone.^{^} Shipments figures based on certification alone.

== Release history ==
Date	Version	Catalog	Format	Label
August 21, 2013	Type-A	First Press Limited Edition (KIZM-90225~6); Regular Edition (KIZM-225~6)	CD+DVD	King Records
August 21, 2013	Type-K	First Press Limited Edition (KIZM-90227~8); Regular Edition (KIZM-227~8)	CD+DVD	King Records
August 21, 2013	Type-B	First Press Limited Edition (KIZM-90229~30); Regular Edition (KIZM-229~30)	CD+DVD	King Records
August 21, 2013	Theater	Regular Version (NMAX-1153)	CD	King Records

== Accolades ==
Japanese Version

Year	Ceremony	Award	Result
2013	55th Japan Record Awards	Excellent Work Award	Won
2013	55th Japan Record Awards	Grand Prix	Nominated
2013	Billboard Japan Music Awards	Hot 100 of the Year	Won
2014	MTV VMAJ	Best Choreography	Nominated
2015	JASRAC Awards	Gold Award	Won
2016	JASRAC Awards	Silver Award	Won

Thai Version

Year	Ceremony	Award	Result
2018	The Guitar Mag Awards	Single Hit of the Year	Won
2018	Kazz Awards	Song of the Year	Nominated
2018	Nine Entertain Awards	Song of the Year	Nominated
2018	Siamdara Star Awards	Hit song	Won

Indonesian version

Year	Ceremony	Award	Result
2013	Hai Reader's Poll Music Awards	Best Single	Won
2014	Global Seru Awards	Most Exciting Song	Won
2014	World Music Awards	World's Best Video	Nominated
2014	World Music Awards	World's Best Indonesian Video	Won

== JKT48 version ==
"Fortune Cookie in Love -Fortune Cookie Yang Mencinta-"
- Regular Version

Single by JKT48

from the album Mahagita
- B-side: First Rabbit; Baby! Baby! Baby! -Passionate Prayer Version-; Fortune Cookie in Love -English Version-
- Released: August 21, 2013
- Genre: J-Pop; Indo pop
- Label: Hits Records

JKT48 singles chronology
"Yuuhi o miteiru ka?-Apakah Kau Melihat Mentari Senja?-" (2013)	"Fortune Cookie in Love -Fortune Cookie Yang Mencinta-" (2013)	"Manatsu no Sounds Good! - Musim Panas Sounds Good!" (2013)

Alternative cover

"Fortune Cookie in Love -Fortune Cookie Yang Mencinta-" is the third released single from the Indonesian idol girl group JKT48. On August 21, 2013, it was simultaneously released with AKB48's release of "Koi Suru Fortune Cookie", under the label Hits Records.

=== Promotion and release ===
The AKB48 sister group JKT48 announced the release of "Fortune Cookie Yang Mencinta" ("Fortune Cookie in Love"), an Indonesian version of "Koi Suru Fortune Cookie", as its third single for August 21, 2013, the same day as the AKB48 release. A teaser for the music video was released on August 3.

=== Track listing ===
The single has two editions: Regular Version (CD+DVD) and Theater Version (CD only)

==== Regular version ====
CD
No.	Title	Artist(s)	Length
1.	"Fortune Cookie Yang Mencinta"
2.	"First Rabbit"
3.	"Baby! Baby! Baby!" (Passionate Prayer Ver.)	Team KIII
4.	"Fortune Cookie in Love -Fortune Cookie Yang Mencinta-" (English Ver.)

DVD
No.	Title	Length
1.	"Fortune Cookie In Love -Fortune Cookie Yang Mencinta- Music Video"
2.	"Fortune Cookie In Love -Fortune Cookie Yang Mencinta- Music Video Behind the Scenes"

Bonus

- Team J Special Photo
- Team J & Team KIII Photo Group [Member Random]

==== Theater version ====
CD
No.	Title	Writer(s)	Artist(s)	Length
1.	"Fortune Cookie Yang Mencinta"	Yasushi Akimoto
2.	"First Rabbit"
3.	"Baby! Baby! Baby!" (Passionate Prayer Ver.)		Team KIII

Bonus

- Trump Card
- Handshake Event Ticket

=== Personnel ===
==== "Fortune Cookie Yang Mencinta" ====
Both the title track and the English version were performed by the following members.

Center: Haruka Nakagawa

- Team J / AKB48 Team B: Aki Takajo
- Team J: Haruka Nakagawa, Melody Nurramdhani Laksani, Shania Junianatha, Nabilah Ratna Ayu Azalia, Jessica Veranda, Ayana Shahab, Rena Nozawa, Beby Chaesara Anadila, Devi Kinal Putri, Sonia Natalia
- Team KIII: Shinta Naomi, Rona Anggreani, Cindy Yuvia, Della Delila, Riskha Fairunissa

==== "First Rabbit" ====
Center: Melody Nurramdhani

- Team J / AKB48 Team B:Aki Takajo
- Team J: Melody Nurramdhani Laksani, Shania Junianatha, Nabilah Ratna Ayu Azalia, Haruka Nakagawa, Jessica Veranda, Ayana Shahab, Sonia Natalia, Rezky Wiranti Dhike, Cindy Gulla, Rica Leyona, Gabriela Margareth Warouw, Ghaida Farisya, Frieska Anastasia Laksani, Sendy Ariani, Delima Rizky

==== "Baby! Baby! Baby! ====
"Baby! Baby! Baby!" (Passionate Prayer Version) was performed by Team KIII:

- Team KIII: Alicia Chanzia, Cindy Yuvia, Della Delila, Intar Putri Kariina, Jennifer Hanna, Lidya Maulida Djuhandar, Nadila Cindi Wantari, Natalia, Noella Sisterina, Octi Sevpin, Ratu Vienny Fitrilya, Riskha Fairunissa, Rona Anggreani, Shinta Naomi, Thalia, Viviyona Apriani

== SNH48 version ==
爱的幸运曲奇 (Fortune Cookie of Love)

EP by SNH48
- Released: 25 November 2013
- Genres: C-pop; Bubblegum Pop; Pop rock
- Length: 41:44
- Label: Ocean Butterflies Music
- Producer: Yasushi Akimoto

SNH48 chronology
Flying Get (2013)	爱的幸运曲奇 (Fortune Cookie of Love) (2013)	Heart Electric (2014)

Music video
- "恋爱幸运曲奇圣诞版" on YouTube

"Fortune Cookie of Love" (Chinese: 爱的幸运曲奇; pinyin: Ài de Xìngyùn Qūqí) was redone in Mandarin for AKB48's sister group in China, SNH48, as the group's third EP. It was available for ordering on November 25, 2013, in Beijing, and November 29, 2013, in Shanghai.

Original Japanese lyrics:

- Yasushi Akimoto

Chinese lyrics:

- Gu Rui
- Gou Qing

Composer:

- Shintaro Ito
- Yō Yamazaki
- Yoshimasa Inoue
- Yoko Kensuke

=== Track listing ===
- **Bold** indicates centres.

No.	Title	Performers	Length
1.	"爱的幸运曲奇" (cover of AKB48's "Koi Suru Fortune Cookie")	Team SII: Chen GuanHui, Chen Si, Dai Meng, Jiang Yun, Kong XiaoYin, Li YuQi, Mo Han, Qian BeiTing, Qiu XinYi, Sun Rui, Wen JingJie, Wu ZheHan, Xu ChenChen, **Xu JiaQi**, Zhao JiaMin, Zhang YuGe	4:46
2.	"浪漫圣诞夜" (cover of AKB48's "Noel no Yoru")	Team NII: Chen JiaYing, Feng XinDuo, Gong ShiQi, Hu SiYi, Huang TingTing, Ju JingYi, Lin SiYi, Lu Ting, Luo Lan, Meng Yue, **Wan LiNa**, Wang YiJun, Xu YanYu, Yi JiaAi, Zhao Yue, Zeng YanFen	4:13
3.	"借口" (cover of AKB48's "Iiwake Maybe")	Team SII: Chen GuanHui, Chen Si, Dai Meng, Jiang Yun, Kong XiaoYin, Li YuQi, Mo Han, Qian BeiTing, Qiu XinYi, Sun Rui, Wen JingJie, Wu ZheHan, Xu ChenChen, Xu JiaQi, **Zhao JiaMin**, Zhang YuGe	4:10
4.	"开拓者" (cover of AKB48's "Beginner")	Team SII: Chen GuanHui, Chen Si, Dai Meng, Jiang Yun, Kong XiaoYin, **Li YuQi**, Mo Han, Qian BeiTing, Qiu XinYi, Sun Rui, Wen JingJie, Wu ZheHan, Xu ChenChen, Xu JiaQi, Zhao JiaMin, Zhang YuGe	4:00
5.	"生命之风" (cover of AKB48's "Kaze wa Fuiteiru")	Team SII: Chen GuanHui, Chen Si, Dai Meng, Jiang Yun, Kong XiaoYin, Li YuQi, **Mo Han**, Qian BeiTing, Qiu XinYi, Sun Rui, Wen JingJie, Wu ZheHan, Xu ChenChen, Xu JiaQi, Zhao JiaMin, **Zhang YuGe**	3:43
6.	"爱的幸运曲奇" (Off Vocal Version)		4:46
7.	"浪漫圣诞夜" (Off Vocal Version)		4:13
8.	"借口" (Off Vocal Version)		4:10
9.	"开拓者" (Off Vocal Version)		4:00
10.	"生命之风" (Off Vocal Version)		3:43
Total length:			41:44

== BNK48 version ==
"Koi Suru Fortune Cookie – Cookie Siangthai"

Single by BNK48

from the album River
- Released: 20 December 2017
- Genre: J-Pop; T-pop
- Length: 25:38
- Label: BNK48 Office
- Songwriters: Pongchuk Pissathanporn; Tanupop Notayanont; Trai Bhumiratna
- Producers: Pongchuk; Tanupop

BNK48 singles chronology
"Aitakatta – Yak Cha Dai Phop Thoe" (2017)	"Koi Suru Fortune Cookie – Cookie Siangthai" (2017)	"Shonichi – Wan Raek" (2018)

Music video
- "Cookie Siangthai" on YouTube

The Thai idol group BNK48, a sister group of AKB48, covered the song, naming it "Cookie Siangthai" (Thai: คุกกี้เสี่ยงทาย; IPA: [kʰúk.kî: sìang.tʰa:j]; "Fortune Cookie").

=== Promotion and release ===
The group performed the song for the first time at the concert 2017: 411 Fandom Party in Bangkok, held at Siam Paragon in Bangkok on the night of 30 August 2017. Sixteen of the thirty members of the group formed a provisional senbatsu to perform the song at the event, including Can, Cherprang, Izurina, Jan, Jennis, Kaew, Kaimook, Miori, Mobile, Music, Namneung, Noey, Orn, Pun, Pupe, and Tarwaan.

The group also performed the song with World Order to open the Japan Expo in Thailand 2017 at Siam Paragon on 1 September 2017.

At the concert marking the graduation of Kidcat on 23 September 2017 in Bangkok, it was announced that the song would be released as the second single of the group, containing the song as the title track and two other songs as the B-side tracks, that is, "BNK48 (Bangkok48)", the eponymous anthem of the group which is a cover of "AKB48 (Akihabara48)", and "Phlio", a cover of "Skirt, Hirari".

It was also announced at the same event that sixteen members of the group who are the regular senbatsu for the songs "Cookie Siangthai" and "BNK48 (Bangkok48)" consist of Cherprang, Izurina, Jan, Jennis, Kaew, Kaimook, Miori, Mobile, Music, Namneung, Noey, Orn, Pun, Pupe, Satchan, and Tarwaan, with Mobile as the centre for the former song and Cherprang as the centre for the latter song, whilst seven of the undergirls in charge of the song "Phlio" are Jaa, Jane, Jib, Kate, Mind, Namsai, and Nink, with Jaa and Mind as the centres.

Officially released on 20 December 2017, the single was available for purchase from 29 September 2017 to 6 November 2017 only. It sold a total of 30,000 copies. and was streamed 1,000,000 times until 12 February 2018

The music video for "Cookie Siangthai" was premiered at a mini concert held at J.J Mall in Bangkok on 18 November 2017 and was published on YouTube later that day. By April 2018, the YouTube video has surpassed 100 million views which is considered as a breakthrough point of the band's career.

=== Production ===
The single was produced by Pongchuk Pissathanporn (Thai: พงศ์จักร พิษฐานพร) and Tanupop Notayanont (Thai: ตนุภพ โนทยานนท์) from La-Ong-Fong band. The Thai lyrics were written by Pongchuk, Tanupop, and Trai Bhumiratna (Thai: ตรัย ภูมิรัตน).

The cover art of the single, produced by The Uni_form Design Studio, was revealed on 1 November 2017, depicting the sixteen senbatsu members with elements representing their favourite sweet foods, such as thong yip and biscuit, as well as Bangkok landmarks mentioned in the group's anthem, including the Giant Swing and the Temple of Dawn.

Directed by Chainarong Tampong (Thai: ไชยณรงค์ แต้มพงษ์), the music video for the title song was shot on 4 November 2017 at the Siam Park City in Bangkok, featuring a number of fans who passed a competition in which they covered the choreography of the song.

=== Criticism ===
The group's company, BNK48 Office, went under fire for neglecting the names of some senbatsu members on the single booklets.

=== Track listing ===
- **Bold** indicates centres.

No.	Title	Lyrics	Performers	Length
1.	"Cookie Siangthai (Thai: คุกกี้เสี่ยงทาย; "Fortune Cookie")" (cover of AKB48's "Koi Suru Fortune Cookie")	Tanupop Notayanont	Cherprang, Izurina, Jan, Jennis, Kaew, Kaimook, Miori, **Mobile**, Music, Namneung, Noey, Orn, Pun, Pupe, Satchan, Tarwaan	4:47
2.	"BNK48 (Bangkok48)" (cover of AKB48's "AKB48 (Akihabara48)")	Pongchuk Pissathanporn; Tanupop	**Cherprang**, Izurina, Jan, Jennis, Kaew, Kaimook, Miori, Mobile, Music, Namneung, Noey, Orn, Pun, Pupe, Satchan, Tarwaan	4:00
3.	"Phlio (Thai: พลิ้ว; "Wavering")" (cover of AKB48's "Skirt, Hirari")	Trai Bhumiratna	**Jaa**, Jane, Jib, Kate, **Mind**, Namsai, Nink	4:02
4.	"Cookie Siangthai" (Off Vocal Version)			4:47
5.	"BNK48 (Bangkok48)" (Off Vocal Version)			4:00
6.	"Phlio" (Off Vocal Version)			4:02
Total length:				25:38

== MNL48 version ==
"Pag-Ibig Fortune Cookie"

Single by MNL48
- B-side: First Rabbit; Palusot ko’y Maybe
- Released: 25 November 2018
- Genre: P-Pop; J-pop
- Length: 26:35
- Label: Star Music
- Producers: Yasushi Akimoto; Yasunari Okada; Paulo Kurusawa

MNL48 singles chronology
"Aittakata - Gustong Makita" (2018)	"Pag-Ibig Fortune Cookie" (2018)	"365 Araw ng Eroplanong Papel" (2019)

Music video
- "Pag-Ibig Fortune Cookie" on YouTube

AKB48's Filipino sister group MNL48 released their rendition of the song as their second single titled "Pag-Ibig Fortune Cookie".

=== Release ===
The single was announced during the Aitakatta – Gustong Makita Handshake event at Movie Stars Cafe on November 25, 2018. Brei, Belle, Coleen, Rans, Lei, Mari, Jan and Kay were formally introduced as the new Senbatsu members for the single, together with Faith, Alyssa, Jem, Gabb, Sela, Abby and Sheki, who is still Center. An exclusive viewing of the music video was also held followed by a live performance of the song. The music video was subsequently uploaded to YouTube on the same date.

=== Track listing ===
- **Bold** indicates centres.

No.	Title	Performers	Length
1.	"Pag-Ibig Fortune Cookie" (cover of AKB48's "Koi Suru Fortune Cookie")	**Sheki**, Abby, Sela, Brei, Belle, Gabb, Colleen, Rans, Jem, Lei, Mari, Jan, Kay, Alyssa, Faith, and Ella	4:45
2.	"First Rabbit" (cover of AKB48's "First Rabbit")	**Sheki**, Abby, Sela, Brei, Belle, Gabb, Colleen, Rans, Jem, Lei, Mari, Jan, Kay, Alyssa, Faith, and Ella	4:46
3.	"Palusot Ko’y Maybe" (cover of AKB48's "Iiwake Maybe")	**Colleen**, Abby, Brei, Belle, Daryll, Ella, Ecka, Hazel, Andy, Jem, Aly, Lara, Madie, Ruth, and Joyce	4:08
4.	"Pag-Ibig Fortune Cookie" (Off Vocal Version)		4:47
5.	"First Rabbit" (Off Vocal Version)		4:46
6.	"Palusot Ko’y Maybe" (Off Vocal Version)		4:08
Total length:			26:35

=== Sales and certification ===
Region	Certification	Certified units/sales
Philippines (PARI) Filipino version, Pag-Ibig Fortune Cookie / First Rabbit / Palusot Ko’y Maybe	Platinum	150,000^{*}
Philippines (PARI) Filipino version, Pag-Ibig Fortune Cookie / First Rabbit / Palusot Ko’y Maybe	Gold	75,000^{*}
^{*} Sales figures based on certification alone.^{^} Shipments figures based on certification alone.

== SGO48 version ==
"Koisuru Fortune Cookie - Thất Tình Tích Cực"
- SGO48’s 2nd Single "Thất Tình Tích Cực" Type A

Single by SGO48
- Language: Vietnamese
- B-side: "Namida Surprise!"; "Shoujotachi yo"; "365 nichi no Kamihikouki"
- Released: December 29, 2019
- Recorded: 2019
- Genre: J-pop; disco
- Length: 4:47
- Label: YAG Entertainment
- Songwriters: Yashushi Akimoto; Huy Tuấn (adaptation)
- Producer: Yasushi Akimoto

SGO48 singles chronology
"Heavy Rotation" (2019)	"Koisuru Fortune Cookie - Thất Tình Tích Cực" (2019)	"River" (2020)

Music video
- "Thất Tình Tích Cực" on YouTube

Similar to its other sister 48 groups, a Vietnamese-adapted version of the song was released as the second single of SGO48 by YAG Entertainment on December 29, 2019, titled "Koisuru Fortune Cookie - Thất tình tích cực." The release also contains Vietnamese version of three other AKB48 songs, namely "Namida Surprise!", "Shoujotachi yo" and "365 nichi no Kamihikouki", with the former having previously performed during the group's participation at the AKB48 Group Asia Festival 2019 in Shanghai. Similar to the group's previous single, all senbatsu performers for the song were pre-selected. It was the first single appearance of member Xuân Ca, and subsequently the last single appearance of Sachi, as well as three other Under Girls: Gia Nghi, Elena, and Celia, with the former having graduated shortly before the single announcement.

To promote the single, an accompanying music video was premiered on their YouTube channel on December 12, 2019, along with another documentary series focusing on the senbatsu announcement and practicing process for the song.

=== Background and release ===
Following the group's announcement to host their first Christmas mini show in December 2019, titled Koisuru Xmas Party on November 22, 2019, YAG Entertainment confirmed that Under Girls member Gia Nghi would graduate to focus on studying a week later, with her final activities being on the mini show's date. On the same day, the label also revealed the teaser for SGO48's next single to be "Koisuru Fortune Cookie - Thất tình tích cực", with the song being performed live and its accompanying music video being premiered for the first time during the group's Koisuru Xmas Party on December 7, 2019.

=== Single type ===
Similar to the group's first single release, the physical version comes in four different types with the same contents, including a collectible digital card, a random bonus photo, a lyric book, and a handshake ticket.

Pre-order date	Release date	Type	Format	Label
Thursday, December 11, 2019	Sunday, December 29, 2019	A	Boxset, digital card	YAG Entertainment
Thursday, December 11, 2019	Sunday, December 29, 2019	B	Boxset, digital card	YAG Entertainment
Thursday, December 11, 2019	Sunday, December 29, 2019	C	Boxset, digital card	YAG Entertainment
Thursday, December 11, 2019	Sunday, December 29, 2019	D	Boxset, digital card	YAG Entertainment

=== Track listing ===
All tracks are written by or co-written by producer Yasushi Akimoto, except where noted.

No.	Title	Lyrics	Music	Performers	Length
1.	"Koisuru Fortune Cookie - Thất Tình Tích Cực"	Huy Tuấn (adoptation)	Yasushi Akimoto	Ánh Sáng, Anna, Trùng Dương, Kaycee, Janie, Sachi, Hikari, Lệ Trang, Linh Mai, Thu Nga, Trúc Phạm, Mochi, Xuân Ca, Mon, Tiên Linh, Sunny	4:47
2.	"Namida Surprise!"	Yoshimasa Inoue, Lê Phương (adoptation)	Yasushi Akimoto	Ánh Sáng, Anna, Trùng Dương, Kaycee, Janie, Sachi, Hikari, Lệ Trang, Linh Mai, Thu Nga, Trúc Phạm, Mochi, Dona, Mon, Tiên Linh, Gia Nghi	4:44
3.	"365 nichi no Kamihikouki (365 Ngày Máy Bay Giấy)"	Lê Phương (adoptation)	Toshikazu Kadono, Hiroki Aoba	Ánh Sáng, Anna, Trùng Dương, Kaycee, Janie, Sachi, Hikari, Lệ Trang, Linh Mai, Thu Nga, Trúc Phạm, Mochi, Xuân Ca, Mon, Tiên Linh, Sunny	4:48
4.	"Shoujotachi yo"	Huy Tuấn (adoptation)	Jun Koami	Ánh Sáng, Anna, Trùng Dương, Kaycee, Janie, Sachi, Hikari, Lệ Trang, Linh Mai, Thu Nga, Trúc Phạm, Mochi, Dona, Mon, Tiên Linh, Sunny	4:35
Total length:					18:57

=== Notes ===
- "Namida Surprise!" was recorded with two other Under Girls members, namely Dona and Gia Nghi, with the latter being her last recording appearance.
