= Baby Blue (group) =

Filipino girl group

BABY BLUE
- Origin: Manila, Philippines
- Genres: P-pop; R&B; hip hop
- Years active: 2020–present
- Labels: Hallo Hallo Entertainment (Philippines; 2020–present); Dreamusic Overseas (Japan; 2021–present)
- Member of: MNL48
- Members: Coleen Trinidad; Amy Isidto; Frances Pinlac
- Past members: Jan Elaurza
- Website: www.babyblueofficial.com

Baby Blue (Japanese: ベイビーブルー, romanized: Beibīburū; stylized in all caps) is a Filipino girl group and a sub-unit of the all-female Filipino idol group MNL48. They debuted with their lead single "Sweet Talking Sugar" in September 2020, which topped in Egg Music charts in Japan and made them one of the few Filipino artists to make it to Japanese music charts.

== History ==
=== 2020: formation ===
On September 1, together with a major Japanese music label Tower Records Japan, Hallo-hallo Entertainment announced the formation of the successful P-Pop girl group, MNL48's first-ever sub-unit BABY BLUE. The said sub-unit is composed of Jan Elaurza, Amy Isidto, and Coleen Trinidad. Following the announcement, Baby Blue officially released its debut single titled "Sweet Talking Sugar", and was made available through EGGS, a Japanese digital music subscription service. The single, according to HHE, is an homage to the famous city pop genre, with a modern take via "the R&B and hip-hop genre". On September 16, The official music video was released on GYAO!, and on MNL48's official YouTube channel, the next day. The MV was directed and produced by Carlo Francisco Manatad of Plan C Productions.

A second track, "NEGASTAR" was released by the sub-unit officially after they uploaded a sixty-second teaser uploaded on the music subscription service EGGS on November 16. The full track was then uploaded on November 25 and was also made available on mainstream music streaming platforms like iTunes and Spotify.

=== 2021–2022: "Stuck On You" ===
Baby Blue released teasers such as pre-saved posters and audio snippets for their third single in March 29, 2021. In April 21 of the same year Baby Blue released their third digital single "Stuck On You". This song is a straight love song with a pop beat and a light sound. The pre-order of the song started on April 7. In May 28, 2021, the group launched their official fans club site where live videos, blogs, and other info can only be seen there. Subsequently, on the same day, they also opened their official YouTube channel and showed content that can only be seen there, such as cover videos, songs, and dance covers of Japanese songs.

In December 15, 2021, the group released their first major single, "Head Up". The track release marks the fourth single released by the group and their first ballad. It is also the group's major debut in Japan. "HEAD UP" was released in advance on December 15 and will be re-released on February 19, 2022.

On June 30, 2022, after her 4 years in the group, Baby Blue's leader Jan Elaurza announced her graduation from MNL48, she also announced departure from the unit. On the same day, it was announced on the official website of Baby Blue that Frances Pinlac of MNL48 Team L will be replacing Jan.

== Influences ==
Baby Blue was influenced by Japanese popular music genres, such as City pop and J-pop. They are also inspired by AKB48.

== Other ventures ==
On December 20, 2020, the group performed on ABS-CBN's "Ikaw ang Liwanag at Ligaya: The ABS-CBN Christmas Special" pre-show entitled "KTnX ang Babait Ninyo: ABS-CBN Christmas Special Fundraising Show" for the segment "P-pop RISE" with MNL48, BGYO, PHP and Bini, a benefit show for the survivors and evacuees in areas hit by typhoons such as Rolly and Ulysses.

== Members ==
=== Current ===
- Coleen Trinidad (MNL48 Team NIV)
- Amy Isidto (MNL48 Team L)
- Frances Pinlac (MNL48 Team L)

=== Former ===
- Jan Elaurza (Left the group in June 2022)

== Discography ==
=== Singles ===
Title	Details	Year	Peak chart positions				
Title	Details	Year	Philippines				
Title	Details	Year	Myx Hit Chart	Pinoy Myx Countdown	Myx Daily Top 10	Myx Most Viewed	iTunesPH Top 100 Albums
"Sweet Talking Sugar"	Released: September 1, 2020; Format: Digital download, streaming; Label: Tower Records Japan	2020	2	1	2	—	—
"Negastar"	Released: November 25, 2020; Format: Digital download, streaming; Label: Tower Records Japan	2020	7	4	7	—	23
"Stuck on You"	Released: April 21, 2021; Format: Digital download, streaming; Label: Tower Records Japan	2021	—	—	—	—	4
"Head Up"	Released: December 15, 2021; Format: Digital download, streaming; Label: Tower Records Japan	2021	2	2	1	—	—

=== Music videos ===
Year	Title	Director(s)	Notes	Ref.
2020	Sweet Talking Sugar	Carlo Francisco Manatad	First Single	
2020	Negastar	Carlo Francisco Manatad	Second Single	
2021	Head Up	Carl Ramos	First ballad song	
