= Degs and Gabba =

Philippine indie instrumental rock band

Tom's Story
- Also known as: Degs and Gabba
- Origin: Manila, Philippines
- Genres: Indie rock; post-rock; math rock; instrumental rock
- Years active: 2010–present
- Labels: A Spur of the Moment Project, Continent Records
- Members: Gabba Santiago; Christer de Guia
- Past members: Tom Naval

Degs and Gabba, formerly known as Tom's Story, is an indie instrumental rock trio based in Manila, Philippines. The band is composed of original members: Tom Naval on bass, Gabba Santiago on guitars, and Christer "Degs" de Guia on drums.

The band independently released its self-titled album in 2016, and is currently managed by A Spur of the Moment Project, an independent record label.

== History ==
The band started in 2010 during their senior years in high school (and at that time, the trio were friends since 2007), due to their musical influences such as Taking Back Sunday and Circa Survive. Although they were never played until in 2011, the trio started their first gig by playing Taking Back Sunday covers at a bar in Parañaque. Originally intended to be punk rock, the band switched to post-rock and math rock but keeping their instrumental rock genre as the main focus.

In 2015, they played their first overseas gig in San Francisco, California.

In 2016, their self-titled debut album was independently released, with "Anchors" as their first original single, followed by two-part sequels "Dream" and "Catcher". On March 4, 2017, the band performed at Wanderland Music and Arts Festival in Filinvest Alabang.

In January 2019, Naval announced his departure from Tom's Story. Santiago and De Guia, as well as their record label, released their own statement on the former member's exit with an added statement involving a serious incident.

== Discography ==
=== Studio albums ===
- Tom's Story (2016)

=== Singles ===
Year	Song	Album
2016	"Anchors"	Tom's Story
2016	"Dream"	Tom's Story
2016	"Catcher"	Tom's Story
2017	"VL Raza"	Tom's Story
