= MNL48 =

Filipino girl group

- MNL48 Logo

Background information
- Origin: Manila, Philippines
- Genres: P-pop; teen pop; bubblegum pop
- Years active: 2018–2026
- Labels: Hallo Hallo Entertainment Inc. (2018–2025); P.O.S Inc. (2025–2026); Vernalossom
- Member of: AKB48 Group
- Members: See List of MNL48 members
- Past members: See List of former MNL48 members
- Website: mnl48.ph (archived)

MNL48 (read as M.N.L. Forty-eight) was a Filipino idol girl group based in Manila, Philippines, and formed in 2018, they are the fourth international sister group of AKB48, after Indonesia's JKT48, China's SNH48 (former), and Thailand's BNK48. The group is named after Manila, the capital of the Philippines. MNL48 is AKB48's only sister group to debut with exactly 48 members.

Dubbed as "P-Pop (idol) Pioneers", MNL48 paved the way to the new era of Philippine pop idol industry and is known within the 48 Group as "Vocal Queens" for their singing ability.

On May 20, 2026, its management announced the group's disbandment.

== History ==
=== 2016–2018: Formation ===
On March 26, 2016, the formations of MNL48, BNK48, and TPE48 were announced at Minami Takahashi's concert.

On October 13, 2017, Hallo Hallo Entertainment announced registration and audition tour dates for the group's first generation. The following month on November 10, Hallo Hallo Entertainment held the first audition for MNL48.

In early 2018, a segment was hosted on It's Showtime by Anne Curtis, Billy Crawford, Karylle and Jhong Hilario which determined the members of the group's first generation. It was a segment in search of the ultimate all-female Filipino idol group whose name would be derived from its base city of Manila. It conducted nationwide auditions for women aged 15–20 years old to become sought-after "idols you can meet". Thousands of women took part in the audition, with only 200 qualifying to start the 13-week challenge rounds that tested their singing and dancing skills. From the Top 200, the aspirants were reduced to a Top 75 that faced public voting until the General Election using the MNL48-Plus App developed by Hallohallo Entertainment Inc. in partnership with ABS-CBN and one of the world's top multimedia, entertainment and IT agencies, AKS. From Top 75, only 48 women became the official members of the group.

From the Top 48, there was a ranking system that followed AKB48's Senbatsu Sousenkyo concept. Top 33-48 were hailed as the Next Girls, the Top 17-32 as the Under Girls, and the Top 16 as the Senbatsu members. From the Top 16, 7 women secured the Kami 7 slots, performing as opening acts, joining AKB48 and all of its sister groups worldwide in concerts; the Kami 7 were also given international endorsement deals and an exclusive training program in AKS. From the Kami 7, the winner (as the Center Girl) of the general election became the face of MNL48 worldwide.

=== 2018: First Generation, Aitakatta – Gustong Makita and Pag-ibig Fortune Cookie ===
On April 22, the "Meet Your Oshimen" event was held at TriNoMa, where three hundred lucky ticket-holding fans met and greeted their favorite MNL48 aspirants. Six days after the event, the first general election took place at Studio 4 and Center Road in ABS-CBN. Before the election on April 28, challenger Kris Torrejos, along with two other eligible contenders Aria Cariño and Eunice Santiago, announced their departure from the group and consequently also withdrew from the upcoming election. A few days after the election, eight trainees, Reiko, Reina, Nix, Ann, Celine, Arol, Kana, and Ikee, also left the group. The newly recruited trainee Cole came in as a replacement member.

On June 3, MNL48's fan-meeting event was held at the Eton Centris Elements. The group performed the Tagalog versions of "Aitakatta", "Heavy Rotation", "Skirt, Hirari", and "Sakura no Hanabiratachi" for the first time. On June 8, members Trixie, Zen, Van, and Mae announced their departures from the group. To fill in the spots, the kenkyuusei members Rans, Nina, and Andi were promoted as members of Team MII. Meanwhile, kenkyuusei Coleen was then promoted to Team NIV. For the rankings, Ella and Ash entered the Kami 7, while Alyssa and Erica joined the Senbatsu. On July 9, Nina and Vern both announced their departures from MNL48, with Cassey filling Nina's position in Team MII.

On August 17, the group premiered the music video of their debut single "Aittakata – Gustong Makita". While their debut extended play Aitakatta was released on September 14, the single was released on September 28. On October 5, MNL48 were announced as one of the participants of Himig Handog 2018. The group interpreted the song "Dalawang Pag-ibig Niya" alongside Your Face Sounds Familiar Kids alumni Krystal Brimner and Sheena Belarmino. On October 26, MNL48 premiered their second music video "Talulot ng Sakura". On November 7, 18 days before the official release of the second single, trainee Niah left the group. On November 25, the group premiered the music video of their second single "Pag-ibig Fortune Cookie" the same day they performed the said single on another "Handshake Event" held on Movie Stars Cafe. On December 12, 2018, trainee Eda left, leaving nine trainees remaining.

On December 11, AKS announced that the group will join the "AKB48 Group Asia Festival 2019" event on January 27, 2019, at Impact Arena, Muang Thong Thani, Bangkok, Thailand after BNK48's sixth Single Senbatsu General Election. At the event, MNL48 performed with their sister groups AKB48, JKT48, BNK48, AKB48 Team SH, AKB48 Team TP and SGO48, with members Abby, Brei, Coleen, Faith, Gabb, Jem, Mari, Rans, Sela and Sheki in attendance. On December 14, it was announced that MNL48 will be having their first mini-concert at Movie Stars Cafe, Centris Station, Quezon Ave on December 23, 2018.

On December 21, MNL48 released "Amazing Grace" music video with MNL48 Gospel unit members Sheki, Belle, Brei, Rans, Faith and Aly. The single was digitally released on December 24, 2018.

=== 2019: Second Generation, 365 Araw ng Eroplanong Papel, Ikaw ang Melody, High Tension & Kapamilya Management ===
On January 26, the group performs for the first time outside the country at the "AKB48 Group Asia Festival 2019" event on January 27, 2019, at Impact Arena, Muang Thong Thani, Bangkok, Thailand after BNK48's sixth Single Senbatsu General Election. MNL48 performed with their sister groups AKB48, JKT48, BNK48, AKB48 Team SH, AKB48 Team TP and SGO48. On February 10, they unveil the music video of the second coupling song from Pag-ibig Fortune Cookie, Palusot Ko'y Maybe as a tagalized version of AKB48's Iiwake Maybe which was performed by Team NIV and Coleen selected as the center girl of the said team's song. On February 22, MNL48 conducts a casting for second generation to take part in the upcoming General Election. On March 1, 2019, they released a third single, 365 Araw ng Eroplanong Papel. On March 25, the 20 members from the second Generation were selected. On April 6, they held their concert at the New Frontier Theater (formerly Kia Theater) near Araneta Coliseum where its tickets were confirmed sold out through their bookings or reservations.

==== Second general election ====
On April 27, the group celebrated its first anniversary back-to-back with the second General Election where all 77 members over two generations competed for spots in the Top 48. On the said event, 29 members who did not make it to the Top 48 immediately graduated from the group. 12 First Generation members (namely Cassey, Ella, Erica, Essel, Gia, Hazel, Jewel, Madie, Necca, Nice, Princess, Sha), 4 First Generation trainees (Karla, Mela, Vira, and Yna) and 13 Second Generation members (namely Alex, Ara, Frances, Gail, Ish, Isylle, Jean, Naomi, Nile, Sam, Sandra, Sun, and Trisha) were eliminated from the Second General Election, with the 12 remaining trainees (5 from the first generation & 7 from the second generation) replacing the 12 promoted members of the first generation who did not rank in the said event. Team NIV's Aly was hailed as Sheki's successor as the "Center Girl" of the group. On May 1, MNL48 held the graduation event for the 29 unranked members in the Second General Election at Movie Stars Cafe at Quezon City to showcase their talents for one last time.

To fill-in the 12 empty spots from Top 48, 6 trainees were promoted to Team MII, 3 to Team NIV and 3 to Team L. Cole, Yzabel, Emz, Jamie, Klaire & Laney were promoted to Team MII, Dani, Rowee and Miho were promoted to Team NIV and Amy, Yssa & Ice were promoted to Team L.

On May 23, 2019, Quincy, a member of Team L, confirmed her resignation from the group. She was replaced by Ella, a returning member from the first generation. The following month, Sayaka of Team MII announced her graduation in their Interaction Live on June 3. Sayaka formally left the group after her final performance on June 9 at the Movie Stars Cafe. She was then replaced by Princess, also a returning member from the first generation.

==== Ikaw Ang Melody ====
On July 29, MNL48 released a new song, "Ikaw ang Melody", a translated version of AKB48's "Kimi wa Melody". On August 24, eight members of MNL48 participated in the AKB48 Group Asia Festival 2019, held at the National Exhibition and Convention Center in Shanghai, China. They joined AKB48 themselves, AKB48's Team SH and Team TP, and their other international sister groups based in Thailand, Indonesia, and Vietnam. This is the second time MNL48 performed abroad, with the first time being the AKB48 Asia Festival in Bangkok last January. Their acapella rendition of their single, "365 Araw ng Eroplanong Papel." went viral on twitter.

On September 4, 2019, Ash, a member of Team L, announced her graduation from MNL48, making "Ikaw ang Melody" her last single from the group. After two days, the promotion of Kenkyuusei member Frances was announced on MNL48's official website. She became part of the Next Girls and also consequently joined Team L.

On October 4, the group, together with K-pop girl group Momoland, signed an exclusive contract with ABS-CBN.

==== High Tension ====
On September 21, the senbatsu members for the group's fifth single was announced on the group's official YouTube channel, with Gabb of Team L as the center. The following month on October 19, the main title of the single was announced. The fifth single track is called High Tension, a cover of AKB48's 46th single of the same name. On November 5, due to committing several house rule violations, Cess of Team MII was officially dismissed from the group. Gia was then promoted to Team MII replacing Cess. This is Gia's comeback to the group after not ranking in the previous election.

On December 31, the annual "NHK Kouhaku Uta Gassen" featured yet again AKB48 with MNL48 included as well as several members from its official local and international sister groups from Thailand, Vietnam, Indonesia, and India, for a performance of their hit song, "Koisuru Fortune Cookie." Abby represented the group as she sang a line of the song in Tagalog. She became only the third performer from the Philippines to grace the prestigious "Kohaku Uta Gassen" stage, following Gary Valenciano in 1990 and the band Smokey Mountain in 1991. Some of those included in that years lineup were iconic rockers Kiss, Japan's pop legends Arashi, and K-pop stars Twice.

=== 2020: Third Generation, High Tension, and River ===
After committing a major violation, Hallo Hallo Entertainment fired Dani of Team NIV from the group on January 13. She was then replaced by kenkyusei member Karla who was promoted to Team NIV on January 18. On January 25, MNL48 announced the third generation audition to determine who would be promoted to Training and Development Team as candidates for third year members. Its third general election's protocol was followed through AKB48's General Election, and JKT48's Promotion-Demotion system. For those members who will be included in Top 48, they will be promoted to Teams MII, NIV & L, while for those who are outranked, they will be demoted to Training and Development Team. Unlike on the previous General Election, no force graduations occurred.

On January 26, Team MII's Faith had her graduation concert at Movie Stars' Cafe, she had previously announced her graduation from the group on December 22, 2019 in their Christmas Mini Concert. Kenkyuusei member Sam was promoted to Team MII on the same day as Faith's replacement . On February 19, the official music video for the group's fifth single "High Tension" was released on MNL48's official YouTube channel. Leaving behind the signature high-school uniforms, the group showed a more grown-up, but still fun-loving image in their fifth single's music video. Since its release, the MV has made its way to YouTube's trending videos list. Due to Faith's graduation, she was replaced by Coleen on the music video.

In lieu with the ongoing COVID-19 crisis, MNL48 members Coleen, Sheki, and Abby, together with other international members of the AKB48 Group, joined well-known Asian performers in the ‘One Love Asia’ benefit show on May 27. One Love Asia is a charity event presented by YouTube and WebTVAsia that sought to raise funds in support of UNICEF.

==== River ====
On February 16, during the group's Valentine Mini Concert at Movie Stars Cafe, the group's sixth single title and senbatsu was announced. For the first time in MNL48's history, Gabb and Abby co-centered River, a cover of AKB48's 14th single of the same name. On June 10, in one of MNL48's Kumu livestreams, overall captain Alice announced that she would join the Senbatsu for River as replacement for Rans who graduated from the group on October 20 of the same year.

On November 11, MNL48 released a teaser video for their single, River. But due to Typhoon Vamco, Hallo Hallo Entertainment released a statement that the release of the music video will be postponed. On November 27, MNL48 premiered the official music video of River. The coupling tracks "Sampung Taon ng Sakura" and "Labrador Retriever" were also released on iTunes, Apple Music and as auto-generated tracks in YouTube Music the same day.

==== Third general election (2020) ====
On March 12, MNL48's Team NIV performed 1! 2! 3! 4! Yoroshiku at audience-free It's Showtime, and they announced that the third general election would be aired at the said program on April 25. Due to the COVID-19 pandemic in the Philippines, the voting lines for General Election were extended until October 31. On March 15, the candidates for the third general election were announced, consisting of 62 candidates (44 from the first and second generations, 2 from Kenkyuusei, and 16 from the third generation). Eligible candidates Rans, Yssa, Lei, and Rowee did not join the Third General Election for personal reasons. On March 24, third generation aspirant Ruby withdrew from the group and consequently the election. Two days later, former Pinoy Big Brother: Otso housemate Jelay joined the candidacy for the third general election.

On May 18, in the midst of the voting process, Team NIV's Joyce announced her withdrawal from the third general election for personal reasons. Eleven days after, Yiesha Amera Ungad also withdrew from the election due to her religion. On June 22, Daryll also withdrew her candidacy following her graduation announcement and also to finish her project as an actress on MNL48 Presents: Chain. On August 4, the remaining second Generation Kenkyuusei members Nile and Trisha was promoted as official members of MNL48. Both were promoted as part of Team NIV.

On September 30, Team NIV Captain Ecka announced her withdrawal from the Third General Elections and the MNL48 group itself due to her marriage. The same day, MNL48 posted on their official Facebook page that HalloHallo Entertainment (HHE) has decided that after the Third General Elections, the group would become a 36-member girl group, in order to focus more on individual projects and sub-units HHE has slated for the next months.

On October 28, three days before the voting deadline, HHE released a statement that the Third General Election would take place very soon. On the other hand, the voting period was extended until November 30. On November 28, Team NIV's Belle withdrew from the election to complete the music video of River, leaving the 56 official candidates of the Third General Election.

On November 29, the first preliminary results of the Third General Election (as of November 28, 6 p.m. PST) were released. First Generation center Sheki led for the center position, followed by Andi, Ruth, Coleen, Ella, Jem, and Jamie for the Kami 7. The first preliminary Top 36 consisted of 11 members from Team MII, 10 from Team NIV, 10 from Team L, and 5 from Third Generation aspirant. A few hours after the preliminary result, during her Instagram live, top member Sela Guia formally announced that she would withdraw from the General Election and leave the group. She formally left the group the following February, thereby making River her last single as a member of the group. On November 30, few hours before the voting cutoff, the second preliminary results (as of November 29, 10:30 p.m. PST) were released. Abby overtook Sheki for the center spot, followed by Andi, Ruth, Jem, Coleen, and Ella for the Kami 7. The second preliminary top 36 consisted of 11 members each from Team MII and Team NIV, 10 from Team L, and 4 from the Third Generation aspirants.

==== BABY BLUE sub-unit formation ====
On September 1, MNL48 announced the formation of BABY BLUE, the group's first-ever sub-unit, in partnership with Tower Records Japan, a major Japanese music retailer. Said sub-unit is formed by MNL48 members Jan, Coleen and Amy. Following the announcement, BABY BLUE officially released its debut single titled "Sweet Talking Sugar", and was made available through EGGS, a Japanese digital music subscription service. The single, according to HHE, is an homage to the famed city pop genre, with a modern take via "the R&B and hip-hop genre". An official music video, produced by Carlo Manatad of Plan C, was released on GYAO!, Yahoo Japan's free online streaming site on September 16 and on MNL48's official YouTube channel on the next day.

A second track, "NEGASTAR" was released by the sub-unit officially after they uploaded a sixty-second teaser uploaded on the music subscription service EGGS on November 16. The full track was then uploaded on November 25 and was also made available on mainstream music streaming platforms like iTunes and Spotify.

==== Release of first-ever original track "HASHLOVE" ====
On December 23, MNL48 premiered its first-ever original song called "HASHLOVE", a pop/R&B song centered around the theme of Christmas celebrations. The track was performed by select members, namely Sheki, Frances, Cole, Jamie, Yzabel, Ruth, and Brei. "HASHLOVE" is composed by Filipino music producer Jungee Marcelo.

=== 2021: Third General Election Conclusion ===
On February 1, 2021, MNL48 simultaneously announced the new schedules of the announcement of the Third General Election results through their social media channels. Set across three Saturday episodes of the noontime show It's Showtime, the announcement of the top 48 candidates would be on February 6, the announcement of the members ranking from Rank 48 to Rank 17 would be announced on February 13. Finally, the "senbatsu" lineup, which is Rank 16 to Rank 1, would be announced on February 20. On February 6, members Aly and Ice both announced their departure from MNL48.

The Third General Election concluded with Team NIV's Abby hailed as the new center of the Third Generation, which was announced live on the noontime show It's Showtime on February 20, 2021. The "senbatsu" lineup was completed by the following in rank order: Sheki, Jamie, Ruth, Ella, Jan, Andi, Jem, Yzabel, Gabb, Alice, Princess, Lara, Coleen, Thea, and Tin.

Following the election, the 'senbatsu' lineup, as well as other select new members from the Third Generation aspirants, were given the chance to express their thoughts during the election period in a media conference hosted by entertainment reporter MJ Felipe on February 22. Throughout the interview, members discussed potential hints for the group's upcoming single, as well as interest in collaborating with fellow P-pop artists, where they dismissed statements of 'competition within the P-pop scene.

On February 25, members Laney and Karla announced their graduations from MNL48.

On February 27, Philippine Pro Gaming League announced that it is giving fans a chance to virtually meet and play along with select members of the group, namely Cole, Abby, Sheki, Gabb, and Coleen. While the match took place on March 8, PPGL announced that the event premiere would take place on March 27.

On March 17, Team MII's Sheki was promoted as MNL48's new overall captain, taking over fellow Team MII's Alice. The same day, an announcement was also made that MNL48 would be joining fellow P-pop groups Bini and BGYO, as well as artists from Star Magic and Star Hunt in an upcoming live stream on March 19. This is after ABS-CBN and Filipino live streaming platform Kumu entered into a partnership for greater exposure of ABS-CBN talents and artists.

On December 18, MNL48 held its first on-site event with live audiences since the onset of the COVID-19 pandemic in the country, with Novotel Manila Araneta City as their venue. On the same day, MNL48 announced their upcoming seventh single, No Way Man.

=== 2022–2023: No Way Man and P-Pop Rise ===
MNL48's Team Padayon consisting of Jem, Kath, Klaire, Miho, and Yzabel won the Pokémon UNITE AKB48 Group Invitational at the Pokémon Battle Festival Asia 2021 by ESL Asia. They claimed the title after defeating BNK48's Yummy Remote 3-1 in the Grand Finals last January 16, 2022. With this win, MNL48's Team Padayon became the first Filipino music idol group to win in an international esports competition.

On April 1, a year after their third General Election, MNL48 released the music video of their seventh single titled “No Way Man”. It is the Philippine version of AKB48's 54th single of the same name. The almost seven-minute music video has garnered more than 43,000 views 12 hours after its release. It also occupied spots in Top 5 trending topics in the Philippines on Twitter. Meanwhile, MNL48 graced the first-ever Pinoy Pop Convention (PPOPCON) in the country, the P-Pop Con 2022. The concert kicked off at the New Frontier Theater on April 9, while the much-anticipated concert took place in the Big Dome the next day, April 10. Aside from MNL48, BGYO, BINI, SB19, Alamat, Press Hit Play, and 4th Impact also attended the event.

On May 22, MNL48 performed with their Japanese sister group AKB48 and other Japanese groups, at the City Football Station inside the Tochigi City General Sports Park, Japan. They took part in the Manny Pacquiao Charity Marathon Suzuki 2022, that was organized by the Manny Pacquiao Foundation, led by the Filipino boxing champion himself. MNL48 members Amy and Coleen represented the group in the said event.

On July 15, a total of 18 P-POP acts including MNL48 joined forces for the first-ever Tugatog: Filipino Music Festival, at the SM Mall of Asia Arena in Pasay City. This music festival was produced by Ant Savvy Creatives, Inc. and co-presented by KUMU, realme, and powered by Ulam Mama. The line-up also included other P-Pop groups like BGYO, BINI, Alamat, PPOP Generation, VXON, LITZ, 1st.One, Press Hit Play, Dione, Calista, R Rules, G22, DAYDREAM, and YARA. Fifteen members of MNL48 participated in the music festival opened the show with their sixth single "River." The group also performed the songs "Pag-ibig Fortune Cookie" and "Ikaw Ang Melody" onstage, and during the group's performance of their song "365 Araw ng Eroplanong Papel", the concert hall was filled with paper planes as fans started flying them in the air. MNL48 also collaborated with BGYO and performed a mash-up of their songs "High Tension" and "Sabay."

On August 3, Hallo Hallo Entertainment announced that MNL48 would embark on a nationwide tour, dubbed as “The Breakthrough: MNL48 No Way Man Nationwide Tour 2022”. The touring show featured MNL48's seventh single, “No Way Man”, in partnership with Robinsons Malls. “The Breakthrough” follows MNL48's mall shows, and the group's consecutive live performances at the music festivals P-Pop Con in April and Tugatog in July.

On October 29, MNL48 went to Jakarta, Indonesia to team up with its sibling group, JKT48. While in Indonesia, the group went as guest performers for TikTok Indonesia's For You Stage. They performed back-to-back, then together, three of their hits. JKT48 first took the stage with “Heavy Rotation,” followed by MNL48's seventh single “No Way Man.” The two groups then joined forces for the Indonesian and Filipino versions of “Koi Suru Fortune Cookie.” They performed alongside Indonesian boyband UN1TY and South Korean icon PSY. The bonding did not stop there, as JKT48 toured the MNL48 members around their theater.

On December 21, MNL48 captain Sheki released her first solo single Tell Me under Vernalossom.

=== 2024: New leadership and original composition ===
On March 1, MNL48 went to Bandung, Indonesia for Playlist Live Festival alongside AKB48 and JKT48.

On June 8, Jem succeeded Sheki as the new MNL48 overall captain at the sixth-anniversary event held at Atmosfera in Poblacion, Makati. On the same day, MNL48 introduced their fourth Generation members.

On June 12, to coincide with Philippine Independence Day, MNL48 released an 8th single called "Summertime" as the group's first original composition after over two years.

=== 2025: MNL48 Inc. ===
On March 25, MNL48 announced the establishment of a new company, MNL48 Inc., which would be based in Japan and operate in cooperation with LiveBuzz Productions in the Philippines. This ended their previous management under HalloHallo Entertainment after six years.

On April 27, MNL48 held a live event titled "Reboot and Rise" at SM City North EDSA, featuring both current and graduating members. At the same event, Jamie replaced Jem as the group's new captain.

On October 11, MNL48 held its "Dream Beyond" concert at the Teatrino Promenade in San Juan. During the event, Dana was given the new role of group co-captain. The event also revealed their 5th Generation members, which notably includes two Japanese members.

In early November 2025, the group announced a special election to determine the senbatsu for the song "Pag-ibig Fortune Cookie 2025", riding on the reinvigorated hype of the 2018 version. The special campaign lasted from November 8 to November 21. On November 28, the results of the special election were announced. The song was initially set to be released within the year 2025, however, due to production concerns and to ensure satisfactory output quality, it was postponed to early 2026.

=== 2026: Planned group name change and disbandment ===
On December 29, 2025, Superball announced that MNL48, as well as their sister groups AKB48 Team SH and AKB48 Team TP were going to be renamed in January 2026. Their company would also be renamed. On January 2, 2026, they announced that their operating company would be renamed to P.O.S Inc., with the name derived from “Pearl of the Orient Seas”. The name change for the group itself was initially scheduled for January 2026, but never came to fruition.

On May 20, 2026, MNL48 announced that it will disband by the end of May after eight years due to unsustainability, with "Pag-ibig Fortune Cookie 2026" as the group's final release.

== Awards and nominations ==
Year	Award(s)	Category	Nominated work	Result	Refs.
2018	RAWR Awards	Favorite Group	MNL48	Nominated	
2018	Popcharts Music Awards	New Artist of the Year	MNL48	Won	
2018	PPOP Awards For Young Artists	Rising Pop Group of the Year	MNL48	Nominated	
2018	PPOP Awards For Young Artists	PPOP Youth Model of the Year	MNL48	Won	
2019	PPOP Awards For Young Artists	Most Favorite Pop Girl Group of the Year	MNL48	Won	
2020	MYX Music Awards	Mellow Video of the Year	"365 Araw ng Eroplanong Papel"	Nominated	
2020	RAWR Awards	Favorite Group	MNL48	Nominated	
2020	Star FM Baguio	P-Pop Group Of The Year	MNL48	Nominated	
2020	Village Pipol Choice Awards	Group Performer Of The Year	MNL48	Nominated	
2021	NYLON Manila Big, Bold, Brave Awards	Favorite P-Pop Group	MNL48	Nominated	
2021	PMPC Star Awards for Music	Pop Album of the Year	"Ikaw ang Melody"	Nominated	
2021	MYX Music Awards	Artist of the Year	MNL48	Nominated	
2021	MYX Music Awards	Music Video of the Year	"River"	Nominated	
2021	Most Played Songs Online Awards	Favorite OPM Artist	MNL48	Won	
2021	Most Played Songs Online Awards	Favorite OPM Music Video	"High Tension"	Won	
2021	RAWR Awards	Favorite Group	MNL48	Nominated	
2021	PPOP Awards	PPOP Girl Group of the Year	MNL48	Won	
2022	NYLON Manila Big, Bold, Brave Awards	Favorite P-Pop Group	MNL48	Nominated	
2022	TikTok Awards Philippines	PPOP Group of the Year	MNL48	Won	
2022	PPOP Awards	PPOP Girl Group of the Year	MNL48	Nominated	
2022	PPOP Awards	PPOP Crowd Favorite of the Year	MNL48	Won	
2022	PPOP Awards	Main Vocalist of the Year (Girl Group Category)	Sheki Arzaga	Nominated	
2022	PPOP Awards	Main Visual of the Year (Girl Group Category)	Abby Trinidad	Won	
2023	RAWR Awards	Favorite Group	MNL48	Nominated	
2023	PPOP Awards	Pop Top Favorite Group of the Year	MNL48	Won	
2023	PPOP Awards	Top Favorite Female Vocalist of the Year	Sheki Arzaga	Won	
2024	PMPC Star Awards for Music	Duo/Group Concert Performer of the Year	Magical Night of Love	Nominated	
2024	Village Pipol Choice Awards	Group Performer of the Year	MNL48	Nominated	
2025	PPOP Awards	P-pop Spotlight Award	MNL48	Won	

== MNL48 Theater ==
=== Theater ===
The MNL48 Theater (MNL48劇場), is where MNL48 holds their exclusive performances.

The MNL48 Theater was initially situated at the Eton Centris Mall along Quezon Avenue in Quezon City, with the theater on its ground floor. The site was nearing completion by April 2019 and was expected to be finished later in the year.

=== Theater Stage ===
On December 10, 2019, MNL48 announced their first theater show, Party ga Hajimaru yo (Tara na Party) which was then held on January 18, 2020.
