= Silpakorn University Art Gallery =

Art gallery and museum in Bangkok, Thailand

Coordinates: 13.7527°N 100.491°E

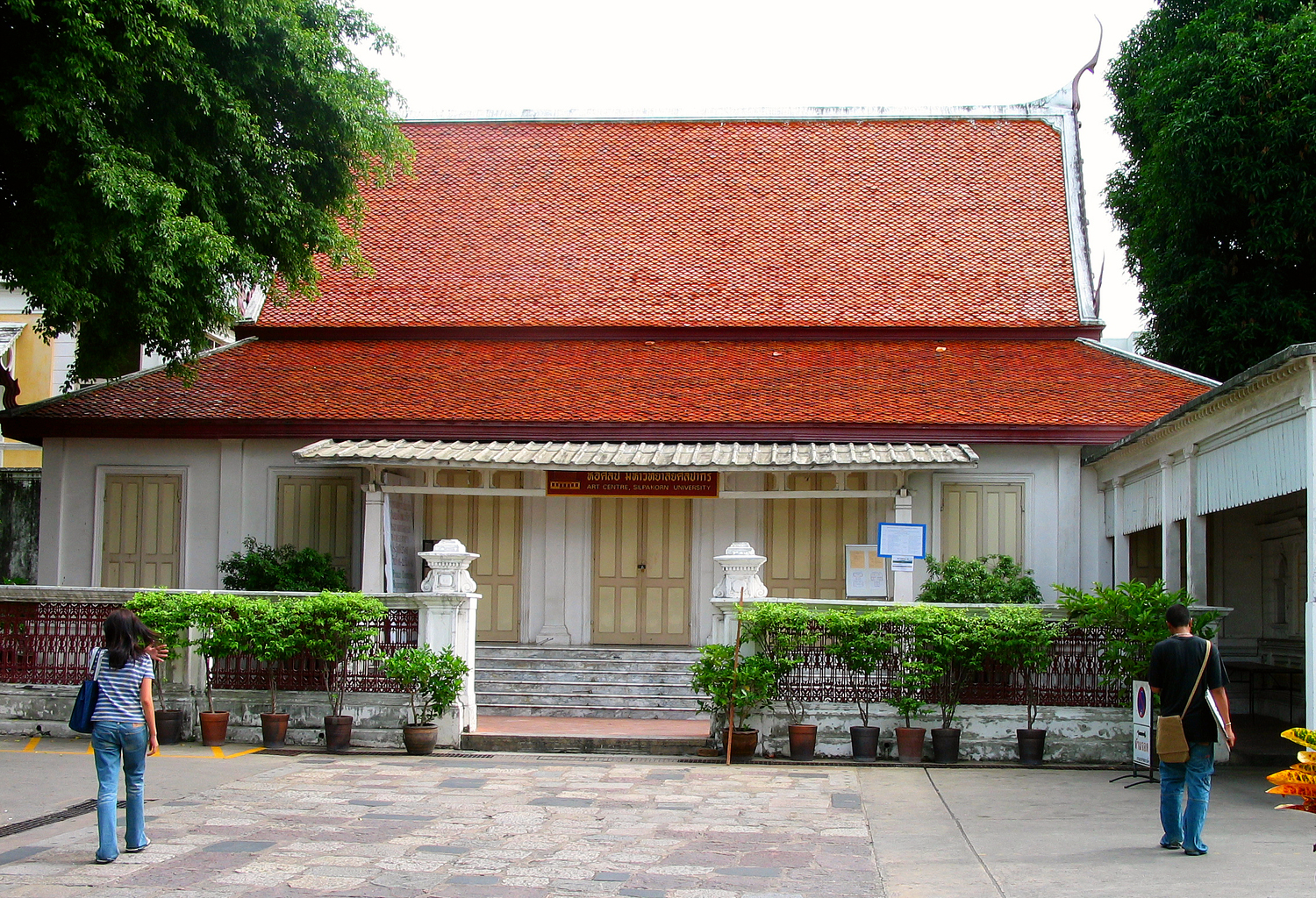

Silapakorn University Art Gallery (Thai: หอศิลป์ มหาวิทยาลัยศิลปากร; RTGS: Hosin Mahawitthayalai Sinlapakon) is an art gallery and museum in Bangkok, Thailand. It is a building in Silpakorn University Wang Tha Phra Campus on Na Pralarn Road, directly north of the Grand Palace and south of Wat Mahathat Yuwaratrangsarit. It was created in 1994.

Silpakorn University (also known as the University of Fine Arts) is a National university in Thailand. The university was founded in Bangkok in 1943 by Italian-born art professor Corrado Feroci, who took the Thai name Silpa Bhirasri when he became a Thai citizen. It began as a fine arts university and now includes many other faculties as well.

== See also ==
- Silpakorn University
