= Jennis Oprasert =

Thai idol group member (born 2000)

- เจนนิษฐ์ โอ่ประเสริฐ
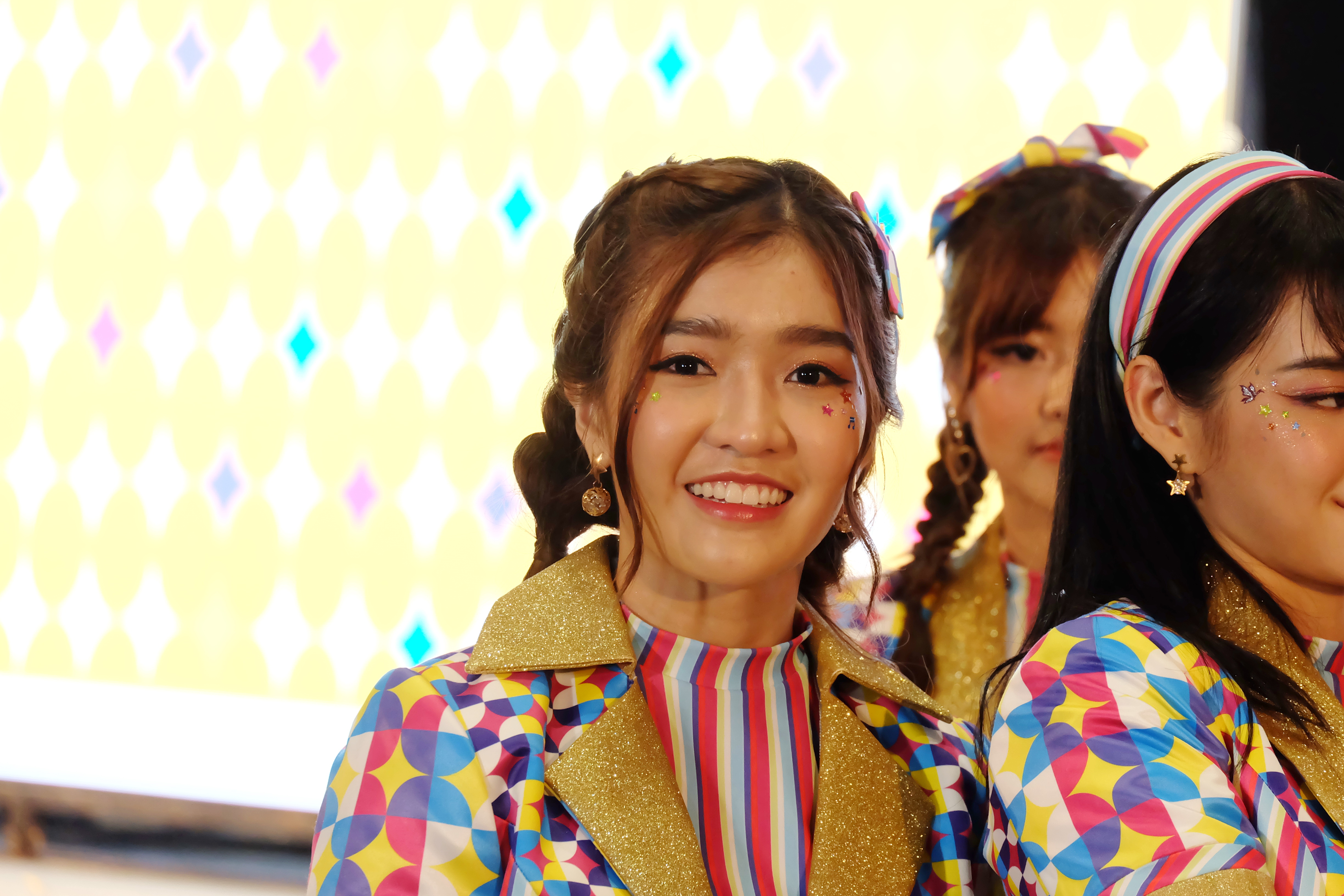
- Jennis in Jabaja uniform, taken on 5 July 2019 at IconSiam.
- Born: 4 July 2000 (age 26); Phetchaburi Province, Thailand
- Occupations: Singer; actress
- Height: 161 cm (5 ft 3 in)
- Musical career
- Genres: Thai pop; J-pop
- Years active: 2017–present
- Label: iAM
- Formerly of: BNK48

Jennis Oprasert (Thai: เจนนิษฐ์ โอ่ประเสริฐ, RTGS: Chennit O-prasoet, IPA: [t͡ɕen.nít ʔòː.prà.sɤ̀ːt], born on 4 July 2000) is a former member of the Thai idol group, BNK48, an international sister group of the Japanese idol girl group AKB48. She is one of the first generation members of the group. Jennis also served as the vice-captain of Team BIII, with Punsikorn Tiyakorn (Pun) as the captain.

== Career ==
=== As member of BNK48 ===
In 2016, when BNK48 held the event BNK48 We Need You, Jennis attended the said event. and later on joined the audition for the group. She passed the audition to become one of the first generation of BNK48. A year later, she was chosen to be the centre of the Thai version of the song "365 nichi no kamihikouki", a track in BNK48's first single "Aitakatta". After joining BNK48, she was nicknamed by her fans as "ลูกพี่" (IPA luːkpʰîː, meaning 'gang leader' in Thai), probably due to her (then) big biceps, no-nonsense attitude and rather direct style of communication.

When the formation of Team BIII was announced at the concert "BNK48 We Wish You! A Merry Christmas", on 24 December 2017, it was also announced that Jennis would be the vice-captain of the team, with Punsikorn Tiyakorn (Pun), as the captain. In June 2018, Jennis decided to participate in the AKB48 53rd Single World Senbatsu General Election. This was the first time international groups were included in an AKB48 Senbatsu Sousenkyo, in order to celebrate the 10th anniversary of the event.

Jennis also took part in BNK48's First General Election. The final result was announced on 26 January 2019, in which she ranked as no. 2, with the total voting points of 58,362. The outcome was regarded as a surprise for many people, for in the first preliminary result, her rank was 6 and it remained so in the second round. In her election speech, Jennis thanked her supporters, saying "her miracle was actually her supporters".

As a result of the election, she was one of the three front-row members in BNK48's 6th single "Beginner". A day later, she, along with other BNK48 members, joined the concert AKB48 Group Asia Festival 2019 in Bangkok. She was part of a special unit, the so-called World Senbatsu (WRD48) unit, and performed in the song "End Roll", along with Mao WeiJia (AKB48 Team SH), Shani Indira Natio (JKT48) and Abelaine Trinidad (MNL48).

In the BNK48's 9th single "Heavy Rotation", Jennis remained part of the 'Kami 7' as she ranked no. 7.

In July 2020, Lyra, a new BNK48 unit, was announced, in which Jennis was a member, along with some other members of BNK48, i.e. Pun, Noey, Fond, New and Niky. The band is the collaboration between BNK48 and Universal Music and will focus on T-Pop genre. Initially it was planned that the unit was to be trained in Los Angeles for 30 days but was postponed until further notice, due to the COVID-19 pandemic.

On 8 October 2022, Jennis announced her graduation from BNK48. Her graduation stage was held on 9 December 2022 with her final performance at the BNK48 Theater was held on 21 December 2022.

=== As actress ===
In 2008, at the age of 8, Jennis played Phrae, an abused child, in a Thai suspense/thriller film, The 8th Day. She was nominated for Best Supporting Actress at the 18th Suphannahong National Film Awards from the said role.

In 2018, she passed the audition for a Thai TV Series Be My Boy and performed in the series in the leading role as Pony.

In 2019, she performed in a drama film Where We Belong as Sue, the leading character, together with Praewa Suthamphong (Music). The film is directed by Kongdej Jaturanrasmee and released in Thailand on 20 June 2019. Jennis and Music also sang "Let U Go", a soundtrack song of the said film. Her performance was highly acclaimed by Thai critics. The film's international premiere was at 24th Busan International Film Festival (BIFF)', where Jennis received Marie Claire Asia Award's 'the Rising Star Award.' She was also among 8 Asian actors/actresses who received 'Asian Stars: Up Next' awards 2019. issued by the International Film Festival & Awards Macao and Variety. She also won 'Best Actress Award' from the 28th Bangkok Critics.

== Personal life ==
Jennis was born in Phetchaburi on 4 July 2000. Being a Thai-Chinese-Lao descendant, Jennis spent her childhood in Phetchaburi, before moving to Bangkok when she was at Grade 4. Her primary school in Phetchaburi was Arunpradit School (Grade 1–4) and Sangsom School in Bangkok (Grade 4- 6). At Grade 6 (year 2011), Jennis won the National Academic Competition Award (Phet Yot Mongkut) in Thai Language. She studied for Grade 7–11 at Samsen Wittayalai School in a special class for those who were classified as 'gifted in science-mathematics', before moving to Singapore International School of Bangkok - SISB. There, she decided to dub her first name 'Jennis' as her nickname as well, viewing that it would be easier for foreigners to call her as such, rather than her real Thai nickname, 'Kraten' (meaning Kingfisher in Thai).

Jennis was studying for Bachelor of Science in Applied Chemistry (International Programme) at Chulalongkorn University. Currently, she is studying for Management and Idol and Influencers Development, Faculty of Music at Silpakorn University.

== Honours ==
Jennis was appointed as a Buddhist ambassador, together with Praewa Suthamphong (Music), for the Māgha Pūjā Day in February 2019 by Thailand's National Office of Buddhism.

On 9 June 2019, Jennis received an Ananda Mahidol Day memorial pin from the One Drop Save Lives Charity Project, together with other 3 members of BNK48 who are students and a graduate of Chulalongkorn University, and the BNK48 executive

== Discography ==
BNK48 singles

Year	No.	Title	Role	Notes
2017	1	"Aitakatta – Yak Cha Dai Phop Thoe"	A-side	Also sang: "Ko Chop Hai Ru Wa Chop" (cover of AKB48's "Ōgoe Diamond") and; "Sam Roi Hoksip Ha Wan Kap Khrueangbin Kradat " (cover of AKB48's "365 Nichi no Kamihikōki") as the centre.
2017	2	"Koi Suru Fortune Cookie – Khukki Siangthai"	A-side	Also sang "BNK48 (Bangkok48)" (cover of AKB48's "AKB48 (Akihabara48)")
2018	3	"Shonichi – Wan Raek"	A-side	Also sang: "Khwamsongcham Lae Kham-amla" (cover of AKB48's "Sakura no Hanabiratachi"); "Prakai Namta Lae Roiyim" (cover of AKB48's "Namida Surprise!")
2018	4	"Kimi wa Melody – Thoe Khue Melodi"	A-side	Also sang "Meun Sen Tang" (cover of AKB48's "Yume E no Route")
2018	5	"BNK Festival"	A-side	
2019	6	"Beginner"	A-side	Also sang "Let U Go"
2019	7	"77 no Suteki na Machi e – 77 Din Daen Saen Wi Set"	A-side	
2020	8	"High Tension"	A-side	
2020	9	"Heavy Rotation"	A-side	
2021	10	"D.AAA"	A-side	Also sang "Sukida Sukida Sukida"
2022	11	"Sayonara Crawl"	A-side	
2022	Special	"Jiwaru DAYS"	A-side	Also sang: "Dung Sakura Ta Lord Pai" (cover of AKB48's "Sakura no Ki ni Narou") and; "Pioneer" as the Double Centre with Pun.

BNK48 Album

Year	No.	Title	Role	Notes
2018	1	"River"	A-side	
2019	2	"Jabaja"	A-side	Also sang "Bye Bye Plastic"
2021	3	"Warota People"	A-side	Also sang "Can you...?"

== Filmography ==
=== Film ===
Year	Title	Role	Notes	Ref(s)
2008	The 8th Day	Phrae	nominated for Best Supporting Actress at the 18th Suphannahong National Film Awards	
2018	BNK48: Girls Don't Cry	Herself	a documentary film about BNK48; as part of the film promotional material, Jennis interviewed, Nawapol Thamrongrattanarit, the Director about the making of the film.	
2019	Where We Belong	Sue	received Marie Claire Asia Award 2019 : 'the Rising Star Award' at 24th Busan International Film Festival received 'Asian Stars: Up Next' awarded by the International Film Festival & Awards Macao and Variety	
2020	One Take	Herself		
2022	Faces of Anne	Anne		
2022	Cheese Sisters	Irene	The movie has 4 parts	
2023	Lonely Castle in the Mirror	Wolf Queen (voice)	Thai version	
2024	The Cursed Land	May	The horror movie	

=== Television ===
Year	Title	Role	Notes	Ref(s)
2018	Be My Boy	Pony	Television Series by TV Channel 5	
2021	Folklore	Jern	Television Series on HBO Asia, Season 2 Episode Broker of Death	
2022	School Tales The Series	Pleng	Series on Netflix, Episode Vengeful Spell	
2022	The Broken Us	Yai-Mai	Television Series on Thai PBS	
2024	Eightraordinary	Joy	Television Series on Thai PBS, Episode Uncle Boonsang The Taxi Driver 1–2 & Joy The Program Producer 1–2	
2024	The Sweetest Taboo	Aim	Television Drama on Channel 3	
2025	Reverse with Me	Bell		
2025	Homeroom	Nithan	Series on TrueID, adapted from Mr.Hiiragi's Homeroom	
2025	Khemjira	Jane		
2026	Plerng Phra Nang	Rim Bueng	Series on Netflix, remake from series of the same name on Channel 7	

== Theater ==
Year	Title	Role
2023	Test Taste of Love	Ai
