= Chamras Kietkong =

Thai portrait painter

Chamras Kietkong (Thai: จำรัส เกียรติก้อง; 10 November 1916 – 8 August 1966) was a Thai painter, particularly of portraits. He produced many oil paintings of important Thai figures such as His Majesty King Bhumibol Adulyadej, Queen Sirikit, and Sawang Sommungmee.

== Early life and education ==
Chamras Kietkong was born on 10 November 1916 at Patil district, Meen Buri in Bangkok. His German father named Gerzen Esgerzen died when he was young. Consequently, he lived with his mother Chai Kietkong. When he was young, the wall of his house was full of his drawings. He started his education at Wat Bharomniwat and then changed to Wat Sommanat School and Wat Amarin. His inspiration and passion in art came from his uncle, Lamyai Kietkong, who encouraged him to study art at Poh Chang art and craft school.

== Occupation ==
His career path began at the Ministry of Education. As a government officer, he was assigned as an Instructor at Bann Somdej Teachers' College. After that, he moved to Sartiwithaya School and then Suansunandha School. During World War II every school in Thailand was shut down including Suansunandha School where Chamras worked. Subsequently, he spent time in that period painting with his friend at the Fine Arts Department. Criticized by Silpa Bhirasri (Corrado Feroci), his work gradually improved in both skill and style. He moved to the Fine Arts Department at the suggestion of its former Deputy Director-General, Thanit Yupho.

== Technique ==
He mostly used oil-based paint and chalk color. His focus of interest lay in human portraiture and figures.

== Fame and reputation ==
Chamras received numerous awards and exhibitions during his lifetime. Silpa Bhirasri once said of him: "It goes without saying that Chamras Kietkong was the best realistic painter we had".

=== Selected exhibitions ===
- 1949 – 1st National Exhibition of Art, Fine Arts Department, Bangkok – Silver Medal Award (Painting)
- 1950 – 2nd National Exhibition of Art, Fine Arts Department, Bangkok – Gold Medal Award (Painting)
- 1951 – 3rd National Exhibition of Art, Fine Arts Department, Bangkok
- 1953 – 4th National Exhibition of Art, Fine Arts Department, Bangkok – Silver Medal Award (Painting)

== Film ==
- สยามศิลปิน – จำรัส เกียรติก้อง ช่างเขียนภาพเหมือนผู้ยิ่งใหญ่ ("Chamras Kietkong: A Great Artist"). Produced / directed by มูลนิธิศิลปินแห่งชาติ ("National Artists Foundation") 2015 (in Thai)

== Bibliography ==
- ชีวิตและผลงานของอาจารย์จำรัส เกียรติก้อง ศิลปินเอกของชาติ ๒๔๕๙-๒๕๐๙ (Life and Work of Ajarn Chamrat Kiat Kong, the National Artist of 1949 to 1959). (library catalogue entry, in English translated from Korean); National Museum Art Gallery exhibition catalogue 2006 (in Thai)
