= Architects' Council of Europe =

European International Architectural Organization

- Abbreviation: ACE
- Formation: May 11, 1990; 35 years ago
- Founded at: Treviso, Italy
- Type: Professional organisation
- Location(s): Rue Paul Emile Janson 29 B-1050 Brussels
- Coordinates: 50°49′38″N 4°21′36″E
- Region served: Europe
- Members: 42 (2017)
- President: Daniel Fügenschuh
- Main organ: General Assembly

The Architects' Council of Europe (French: Conseil des Architectes d'Europe) is a professional organisation of architects from Europe that aims to help advance architecture and maintain its quality. It was founded on 11 May 1990 in Treviso, Italy by the merger of two organisations: the Liaison Committee of the Architects of the United Europe and the Council of European Architects.

== Members ==
The ACE functions as a federation that is composed of 44 Member Organisations, such as:

- The Association of German Architects
- The Royal Institute of the Architects of Ireland
- The Slovak Chamber of Architects
- The Royal Institute of British Architects
- The Danish Association of Architects
- The Conseil National de l'Ordre des Architectes CNOA

The Member Organisations meet in a yearly General Assembly. In 2021, the ACE General Assembly was held in Brussels.

== Policies ==
On 4 May 2019, in Innsbruck (Austria), the Architects’ Council of Europe presented a "Statement on Achieving Quality in the Built Environment", on the occasion of its Conference on the theme “How to Achieve Quality in the Built Environment: Quality assurance tools and systems”.

== Presidents ==
Tenure	President	Country
1990	Romano Viviani	Italy
1991	Georges Reuter	Luxembourg
1992	Francisco da Silva Dias	Portugal
1993	Diethart Weber	Germany
1994	Frank Duffy	United Kingdom
1995	Jean-Marie Fauconnier	Belgium
1996	Hans Haagensen	Denmark
1997	Ioannis Tsouderos	Greece
1998	Jaime Duro Pifarré	Spain
1999	Hervé Nourissat	France
2000	Eoin O'Cofaigh	Ireland
2001	Utz Purr	Austria
2002	Juhani Katainen	Finland
2003	Katarina Nilsson	Sweden
2004	Leopoldo Freyrie	Italy
2005	Marie-Helene Lucas	Luxembourg
2006–2007	Jean-François Susini	France
2008–2009	Juhani Katainen	Finland
2010–2013	Selma Harrington	Ireland
2014–2017	Luciano Lazzari	Italy
2018–2021	Georg Pendl	Austria
2022–2025	Ruth Schagemann	Germany
2025–2026	Carl Bäckstrand	Sweden
2026–present	Daniel Fügenschuh	Austria
