= Chirapat Prapandvidya =

Thai archaeologist

Chirapat Prapandvidya (Thai: จิรพัฒน์ ประพันธ์วิทยา, RTGS: Chiraphat Praphanwitthaya; born 15 March 1941) is a Thai archaeologist, Sanskrit scholar and an Indologist. He was the founder and the first Director of Sanskrit Studies Centre at Silpakorn University in Bangkok. He has also published over a hundred articles on Sanskrit and Indology. In the year 2022, Govt of India honoured Chirapat Prapandvidya by conferring the Padma Shri award for his contributions to literature and education.

== Life and work ==
Chirapat Prapandvidya is the founder and the first director of the Sanskrit Studies Centre in Silpakorn University in Thailand. The centre, established in 1996 to promote Sanskrit study and research, is under the patronage of HRH Princess Maha Chakri Sirindhorn who is herself an Indologist and a Sanskrit scholar. She is the recipient of the first World Sanskrit Award and the Padma Bhushan Award from the Government of India. The construction of the building of the centre was partially funded by Government of India. Chirapat Prapandvidya has played an crucial role in popularizing the teaching and research of Sanskrit in Thailand. He has constantly striven to motivate and encourage students and teachers of Sanskrit in Thailand to understand and appreciate Indian culture and heritage.

== Padma Shri award ==
- In the year 2022, Govt of India conferred the Padma Shri award, the third highest award in the Padma series of awards, on Chirapat Prapandvidya for his distinguished service in the field of literature and education. The award is in recognition of his service "for contributing towards Indo-Thai connections and friendship for decades".

== Other recognitions ==
The awards and recognitions conferred on Chirapat Prapandvidya include:

- Honorary Doctorate Degree from Mahachulalong-kornrajavidyalaya University, Bangkok (2010)
- Vidya Vacaspati (DLitt) degree from Rashtiya Sanskrit Sansthan, New Delhi (2012)
- Presidential Award of the Certificate of Honour in Sanskrit (International), New Delhi (2017)
- Certificate of Honour from Govt of Uttar Pradesh for his literary contributions related to Ramayana (2019)

== See also ==
- Padma Shri Award recipients in the year 2022

== Additional reading ==
- Faculty of Archaeology. Department of Oriental Languages (2016). Felicitation to Sanskrit Icon of Thailand: Asst. Prof. Dr. Chirapat Prapandvidya on the Auspicious Occasion of His 72nd Birth Anniversary. Bangkok: Department of Oriental Languages, Faculty of Archaeology, Silpakorn University, 2016. ISBN 9789746415941.
