= The Broken Us =

Thai television series

- Thai: ณ ขณะเหงา
- Genre: Drama
- Screenplay by: Minta Bhanaparin; Jarunun Phantachat, Neelacha Fuangfookiat; Kamolsuang Aksharanugraha
- Directed by: Wirada Khuhavanta
- Starring: Bhumibhat Thavornsiri; Jennis Oprasert; Nattapat Nimjirawat; Ratklao Amaradit
- Theme music composer: Pharadee Timsungnoen
- Ending theme: The Broken Us performed by Max Jenmana
- Country of origin: Thailand
- Original language: Thai
- No. of episodes: 12

Production
- Executive producers: Thiti Sutthikulphanich; Ratiwan Thanadhamaroj
- Producer: Jeerapa Rawangkarn
- Cinematography: Jintaphap Sakkaew; Tanai Nimcharoenpong
- Editor: Wisarut Janpensri
- Running time: 50 minutes
- Production companies: Juvenile Co, LTD

Original release
- Network: Thai PBS 3
- Release: October 30 – December 10, 2022

The Broken Us (Thai: ณ ขณะเหงา; lit: "A Moment of Loneliness") is a 2022 Thai television series for 12 episodes, starring Bhumibhat Thavornsiri, Jennis Oprasert, Ratklao Amaradit.

It tells about a single event brings four strangers into each other's lives. They're all very different and struggling with their own concerns, which leads to friction as well as understanding.

== Plot summary ==
Sun, a man with Asperger’s syndrome, plans to take his own life without success as the death of the old man named Mok, a café and humble library owner called Tiny Butterfly leads him to meet Yai-Mai, a confident finance planner girl who loves one-night-stand relationship. Tor, a 16-year-old boy runs away from home and Miang, a widow who owns the building that Mok is renting. From a lonely soul living in solitude, they become connected.

== Cast ==
=== Main ===
- Bhumibhat Thavornsiri as Sun, a lonely polite unemployed autistic chemist
- Jennis Oprasert as Yai-Mai (the silk), 27, red-haired financial planner who likes one-night stands
- Nattapat Nimjirawat as Tor, 16, a boy who ran away from home in the countryside
- Ratklao Amaradit as Miang, a middle-aged widow who owns a building that houses Tiny Butterfly

=== Supporting ===
- Mollywon Pantarak as Reiko, Miang's fortune teller junior friend
- Akiko Ozeki as Atom, Yai-Mai's chitchat colleague friend
- Krissana Setthatumrong as Yen (the cool), the old homeless garbage collector
- Suprawat Pattamasoot as Mok (the mist), the late Tiny Butterfly owner
- Latthgarmon Pinrojnkeerathi as Moon, Sun's pregnant younger sister who lives abroad with her foreign husband

== Production and broadcast ==
The building is assumed to be Tiny Butterfly is actually a coffee shop in a 100-year-old European-style building that has been renovated into a chic three-story café called Pömpano Café. Its location is on the corner of Maitri Chit Junction, the five-way intersection where Maitri Chit Road meets Krung Kasem Road, Mittaphap Thai-China Road, Rama IV Road, and Soi Porisapha, on the border of Pom Prap Sattru Phai and Samphanthawong Districts in the southeast fringe of Bangkok's Chinatown. Also, it is located catty-corner from the Hua Lamphong Railway Station.

Actress and singer, member of teen idol girl group BNK48, Jennis Oprasert, has to play the role of Yai-Mai, 27 hot office girl, a character that is several years older than herself. The scene where she dances seductively in a pub is the one she choreographed herself, taking 3 hrs.

The Broken Us airs on Thai PBS every Saturday and Sunday at 8:15 p.m. starting October 30, 2022.
