= Silpakorn University =

Public university in Bangkok, Thailand

- มหาวิทยาลัยศิลปากร
- Ganesha Silpakorn University's Emblem
- Former name: University of Fine Arts
- Motto: Ars longa, vita brevis
- Motto in English: Art is long, life is short.
- Type: Autonomous public university
- Established: 12 October 1943
- Affiliations: ASAIHL
- President: Asst. Prof. Wanchai Sutananta
- Royal conferrer: Maha Chakri Sirindhorn, Princess Royal of Thailand on behalf of the King
- Students: 25,210 (2016)
- Undergraduates: 21,942 (2016)
- Postgraduates: 2,483 (2016)
- Doctoral students: 785 (2016)
- Location: Bangkok, Thailand; 13°45′10.93″N 100°29′27.98″E
- Campus: Urban and Rural (varied by campus)
- Anthem: Santa Lucia
- Colors: Viridian
- Website: www.su.ac.th

Silpakorn University (SU.) (Thai: มหาวิทยาลัยศิลปากร; RTGS: Mahawitthayalai Sinlapakon; also known as The University of Fine Arts of Thailand) is the first arts university and one of the oldest universities in Thailand. Originally renowned for its excellence in fine arts, design, architecture, archaeology, and music, the university has since expanded its academic offerings to encompass all major disciplines. The university was founded in Bangkok in 1943 by Tuscan–born art professor Corrado Feroci, who took the Thai name Silpa Bhirasri when he became a Thai citizen. It began as a fine arts university and now includes many other faculties as well. In 2016, it has 25,210 students.

== History ==
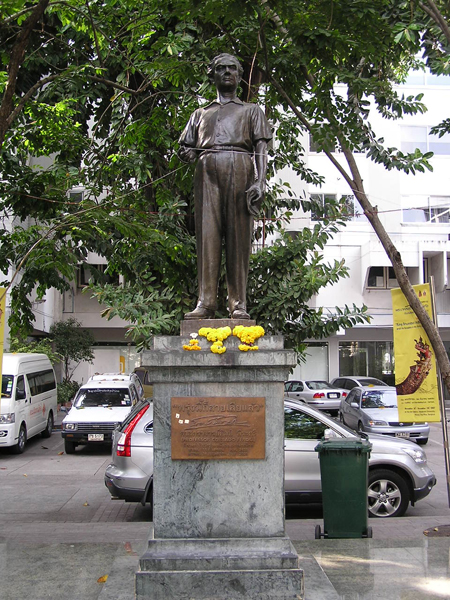
Silpa Bhirasri statue, Silpakorn University

Silpakorn University was originally established as the School of Fine Arts under Thailand's Fine Arts Department in 1933. The school offered the only painting and sculpture programs and waived tuition fees for government officials and students. Its creation owes much to the almost lifetime devotion of Silpa Bhirasri, an Italian sculptor (formerly Corrado Feroci) who was commissioned during the reign of King Rama VI to work in the Fine Arts Department. He subsequently enlarged his classes to include greater members of the interested public before setting up the School of Fine Arts. The school gradually developed and was officially accorded a new status and named Silpakorn University on 12 October 1943. Its inaugural faculty was the Faculty of Painting and Sculpture. In 1955, the Faculty of Thai Architecture was established, later named the Faculty of Architecture) and two more faculties were created, the Faculty of Archaeology and the Faculty of Decorative Arts.

In 1966, Silpakorn University diversified the four faculties into sub–specializations to broaden its offerings, but the university's Wang Tha Phra campus proved inadequate. A new campus, Sanam Chandra Palace, was established in Nakhon Pathom Province in the former residential compound of King Rama VI. The first two faculties based on this campus were the Faculty of Arts in 1968 and the Faculty of Education in 1970. Later, three more faculties were created: the Faculty of Science in 1972, the Faculty of Pharmacy in 1986, and the Faculty of Engineering and Industrial Technology in 1992. In 1999, the Faculty of Music was created.

In 1997, Silpakorn extended its reach by establishing a new campus in Phetchaburi Province. The new campus was named "Phetchaburi Information Technology Campus". In 2001 and 2002, the Faculty of Animal Sciences and Agricultural Technology and the Faculty of Management Science were established on the Phetchaburi Campus. In 2003, the Faculty of Information and Communication Technology (ICT) was established, as well as Silpakorn University International College (SUIC).

Ganesha, one of the Hindu deities symbolizing arts and crafts, is Silpakorn University's emblem. The "university tree" is the chan tree.

== Campuses ==
=== Tha Phra Palace ===
Tha Phra Palace was Silpakorn's first campus. It occupies a small part of the inner city of Bangkok known as Rattanakosin Island. Opposite the Grand Palace and covering an area of 8 rai, the campus was once the palace of Prince Narisara Nuwattiwong. On its west side is the Chao Phraya River. The office of the university president is in Taling Chan District, Bangkok.

=== Sanam Chandra Palace Campus ===
Sanam Chandra Palace Campus is on the grounds of Sanam Chandra Palace in Nakhon Pathom which was once the royal pavilion of King Vajiravudh (Rama VI) of Chakri dynasty. It occupies 440 rai.

=== Phetchaburi Information Technology Campus ===
The 820 rai Phetchaburi Information Technology Campus is in Phetchaburi Province.

== Faculties ==
- Faculty of Painting, Sculpture and Graphic Arts
- Faculty of Architecture
- Faculty of Archaeology
- Faculty of Decorative Arts
- Faculty of Arts
- Faculty of Education
- Faculty of Science
- Faculty of Pharmacy
- Faculty of Engineering and Industrial Technology
- Faculty of Music
- Faculty of Animal Sciences and Agricultural Technology
- Faculty of Management Science
- Faculty of Information and Communication Technology
- Faculty of Allied Health Sciences
- Silpakorn University International College (SUIC)
- Graduate School

== Notable alumni ==
- Princess Maha Chakri Sirindhorn – Princess of Thailand
- Princess Chulabhorn – Princess of Thailand
- Princess Siribhachudabhorn – Princess of Thailand
- Angkarn Kalayanapong – National Artist of Thailand (Literature), poet
- Chalermchai Kositpipat – National Artist of Thailand (Fine art and visual art), Founder of the White Temple (Wat Rong Khun)
- Thawan Duchanee – National Artist of Thailand (Fine art and visual art)
- Mathar Bunnag – Thai architect
- Chirapat Prapandvidya – Thai archaeologist, Sanskrit scholar and Indologist
- Santi Leksukhum – Thai art historian and archaeologist
- Sujit Wongthes – Thai journalist, historian, and author
- Chavalit Soemprungsuk – National Artist of Thailand (visual art), painter
- Chanyawee Sompreeda – Thai novelist with the pen name "Rompaeng", whose novel is the basis for the TV series Love Destiny
- Jumpol Adulkittiporn – Thai actor, model and host
- Jennie Panhan – Thai actress and host
- Jennis Oprasert – former member of the Thai idol group, BNK48
- Wichayanee Pearklin – Thai singer, actress, and television host
- Wirot Nutaphand – Thai herpetology and scientific illustrator
- Wannarot Sonthichai – Thai film and television actress
- Jennis Oprasert – Thai pop singer
- Bhasidi Petchsutee – Thai actress and model
- Thanaphum Sestasittikul - Thai actor, model, and member of the Thai boy band DEXX
- Thasorn Klinnium – Thai actress, singer and model
- Oom Eisaya Hosuwan - Thai actress and model

== Gallery ==
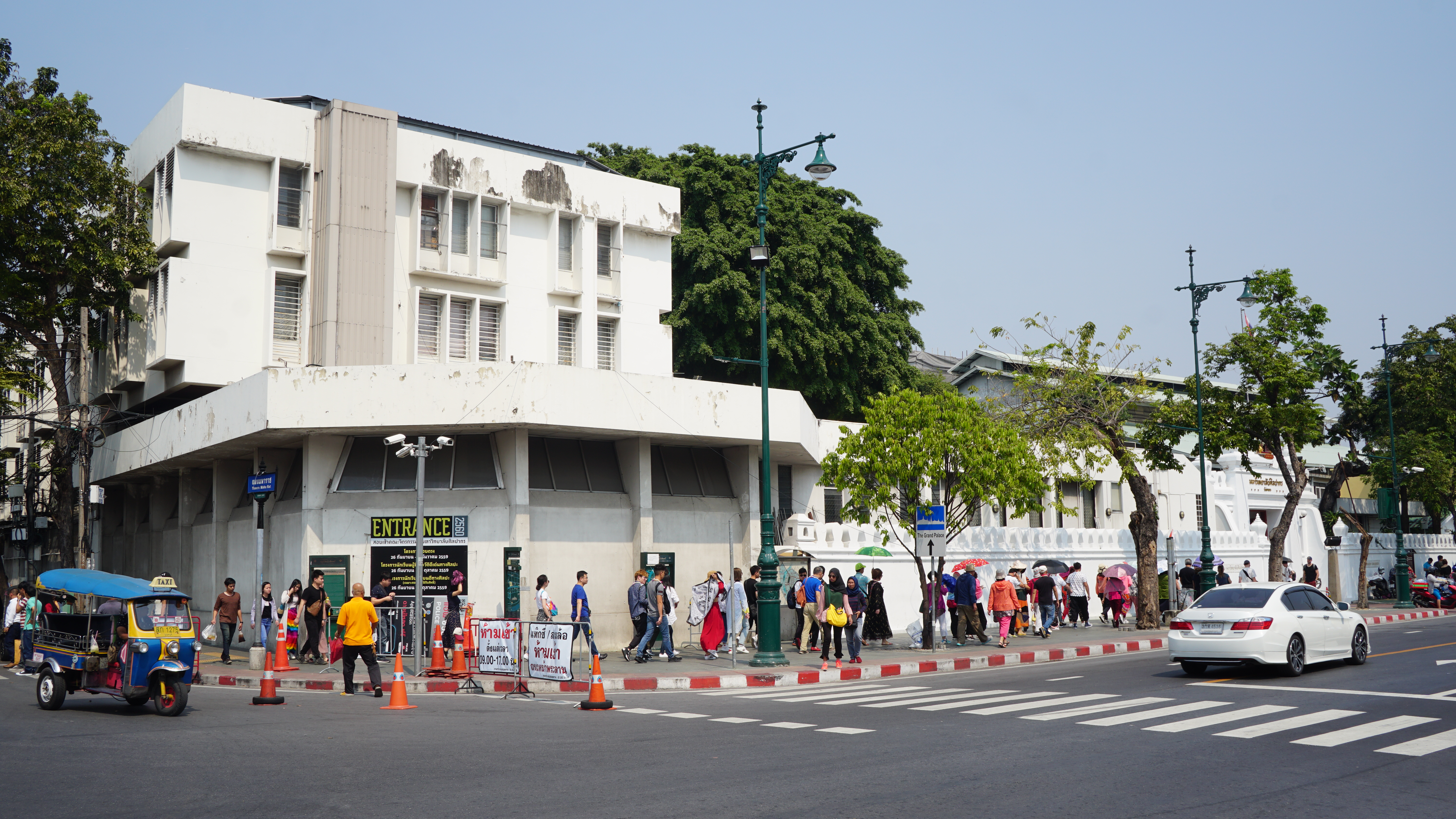
Wang Tha Phra campus

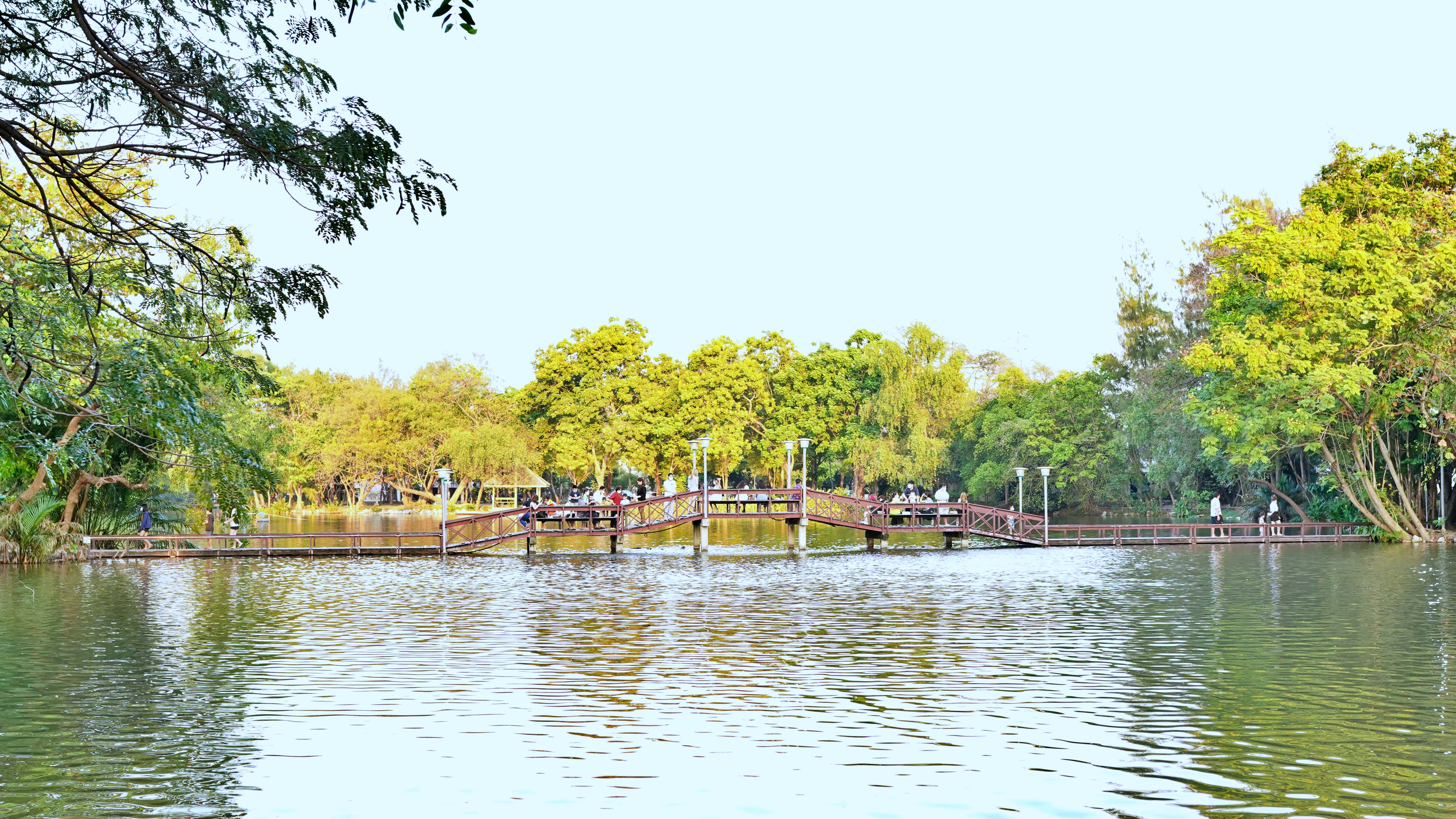
Sapan Sa Kaeo Bridge, Sanam Chandra Palace Campus

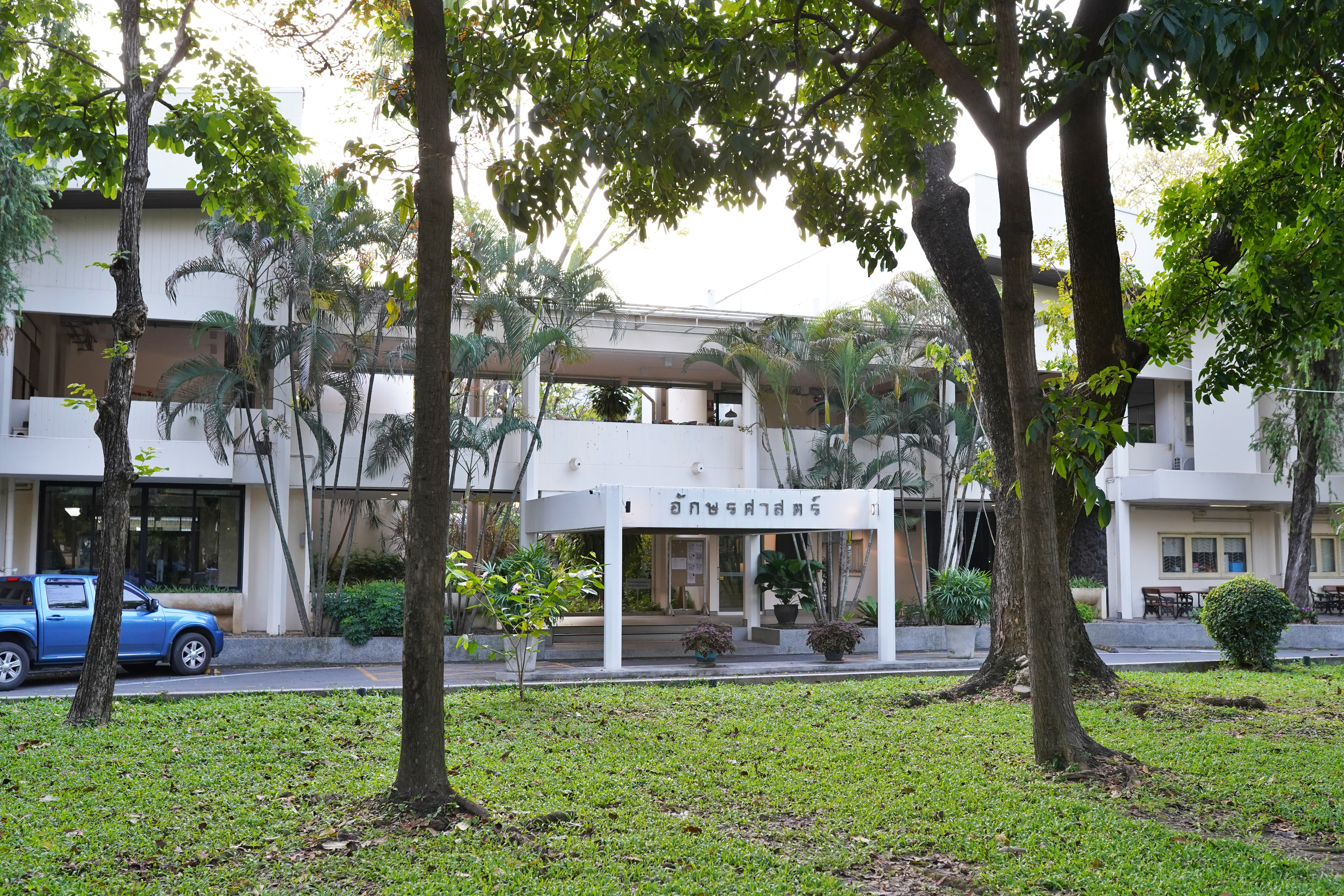
Faculty of Arts

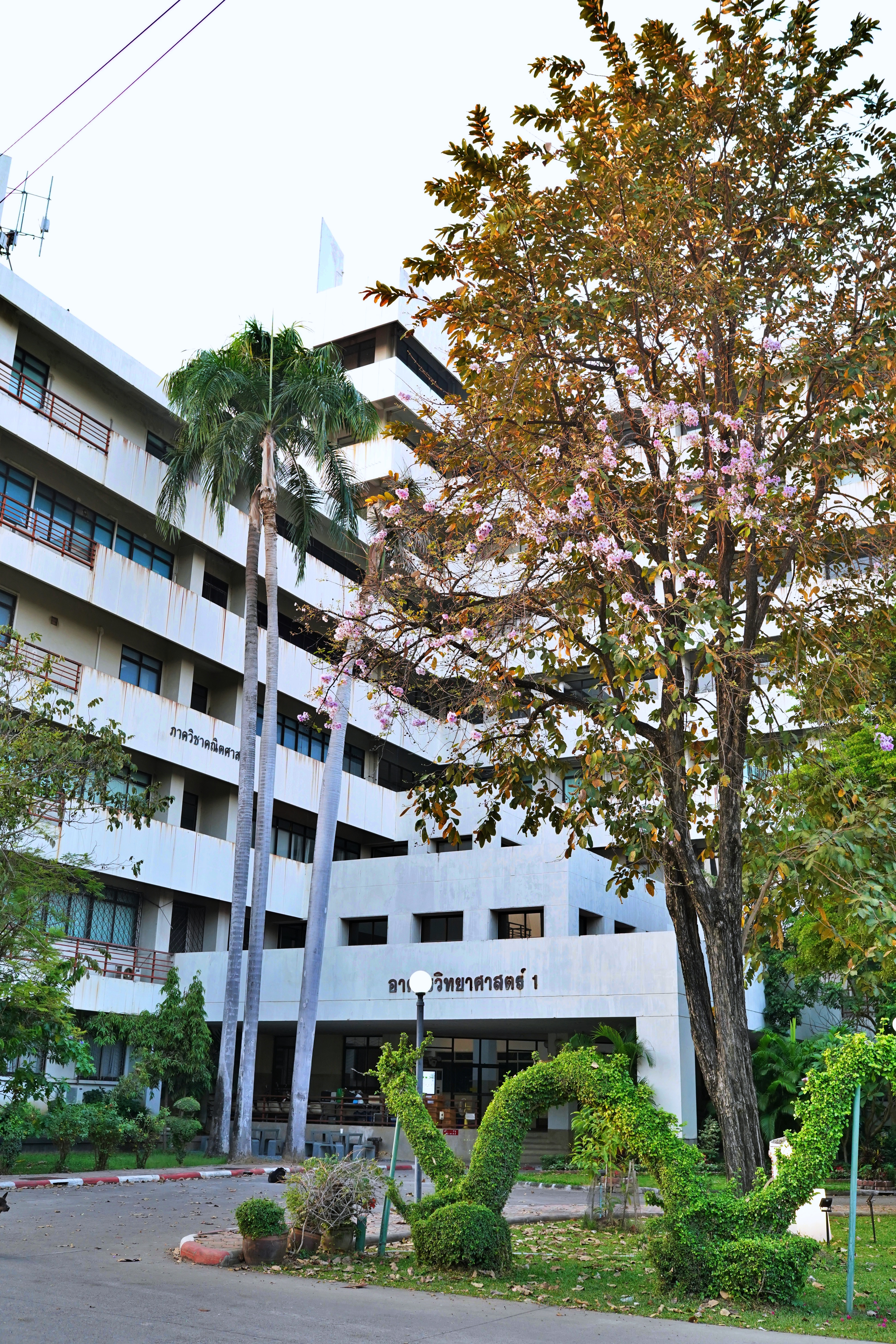
Faculty of Science

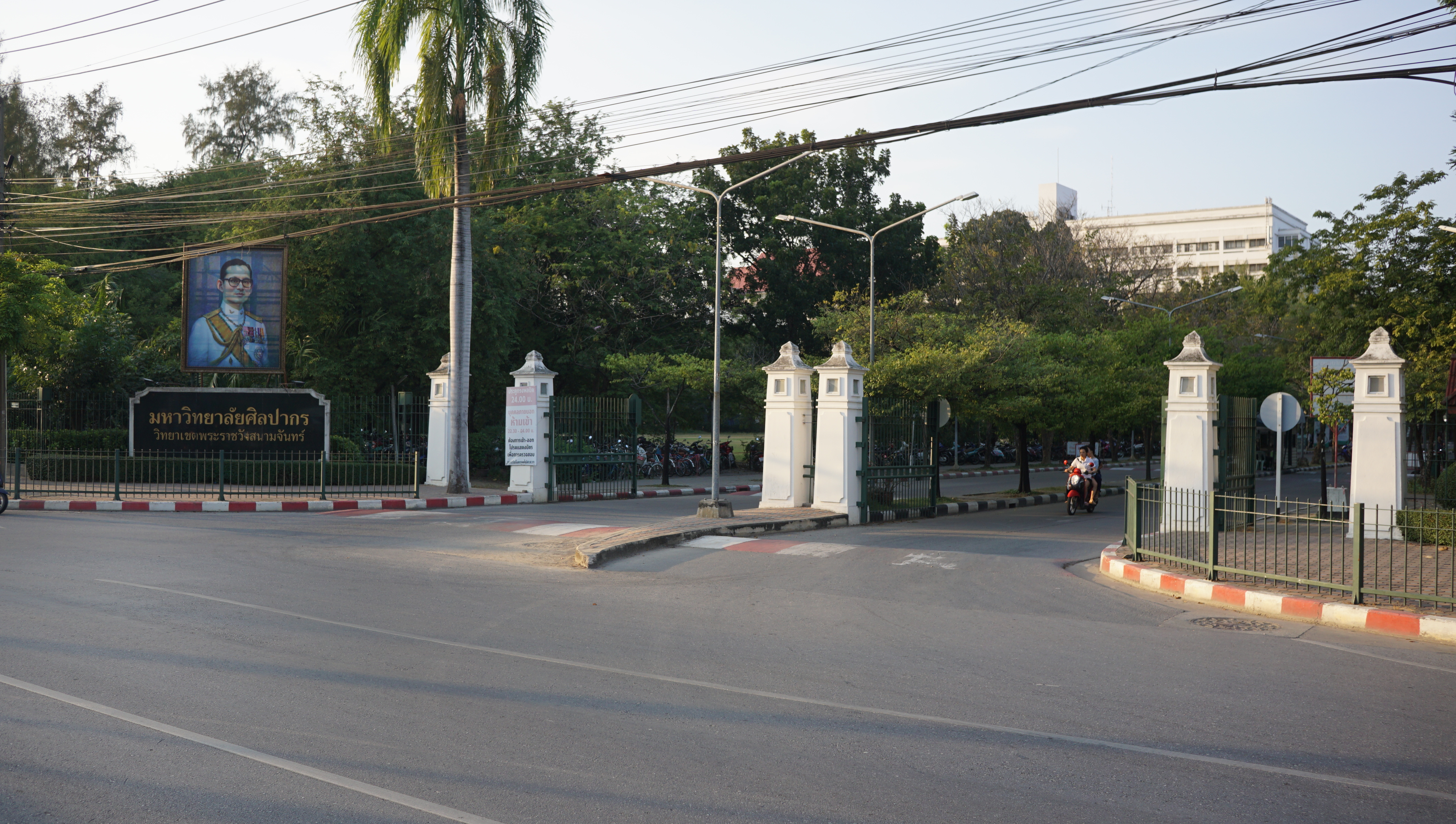
Main gate, Sanam Chandra Palace Campus

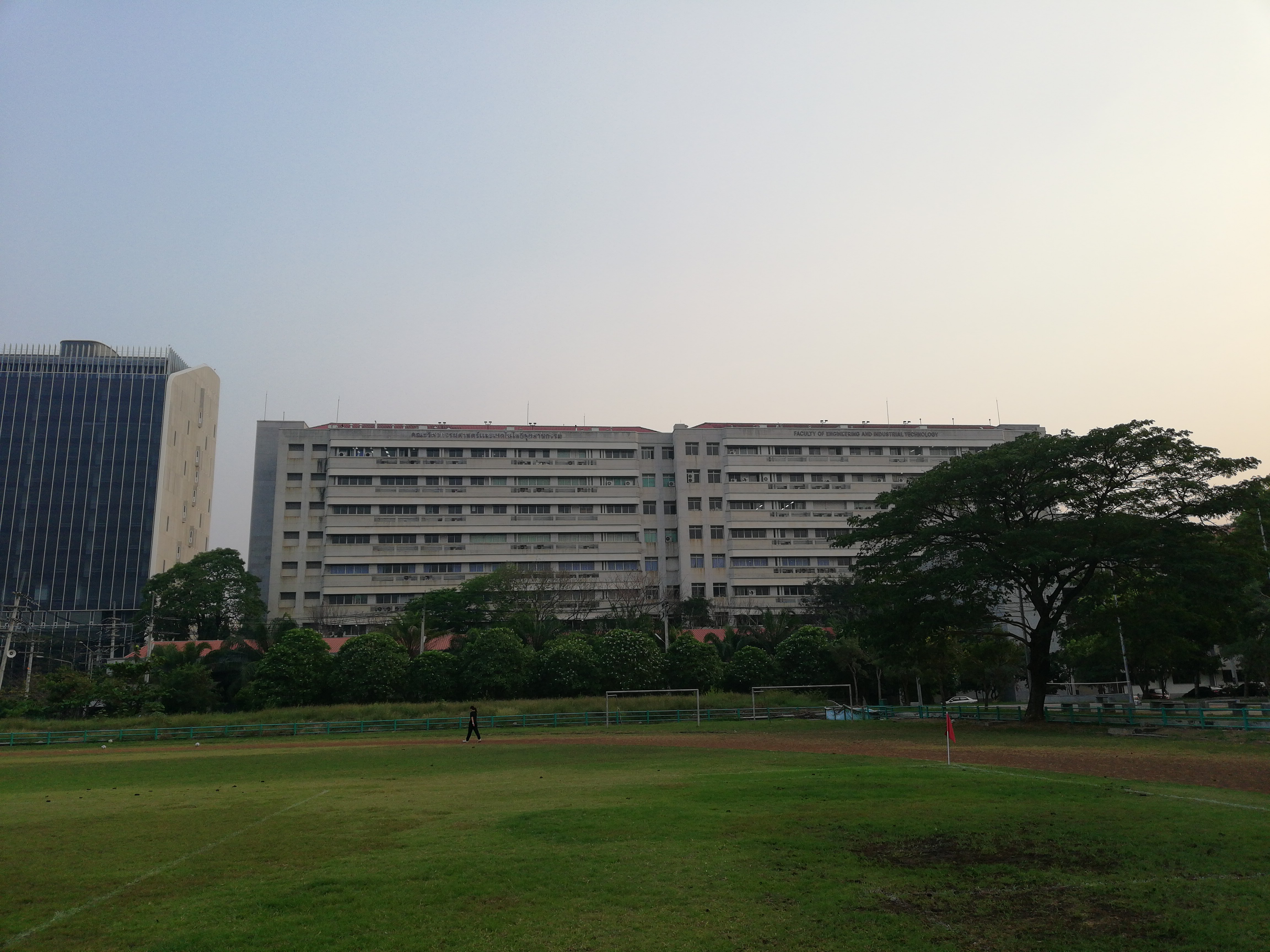
Faculty of Engineering and Industrial Technology

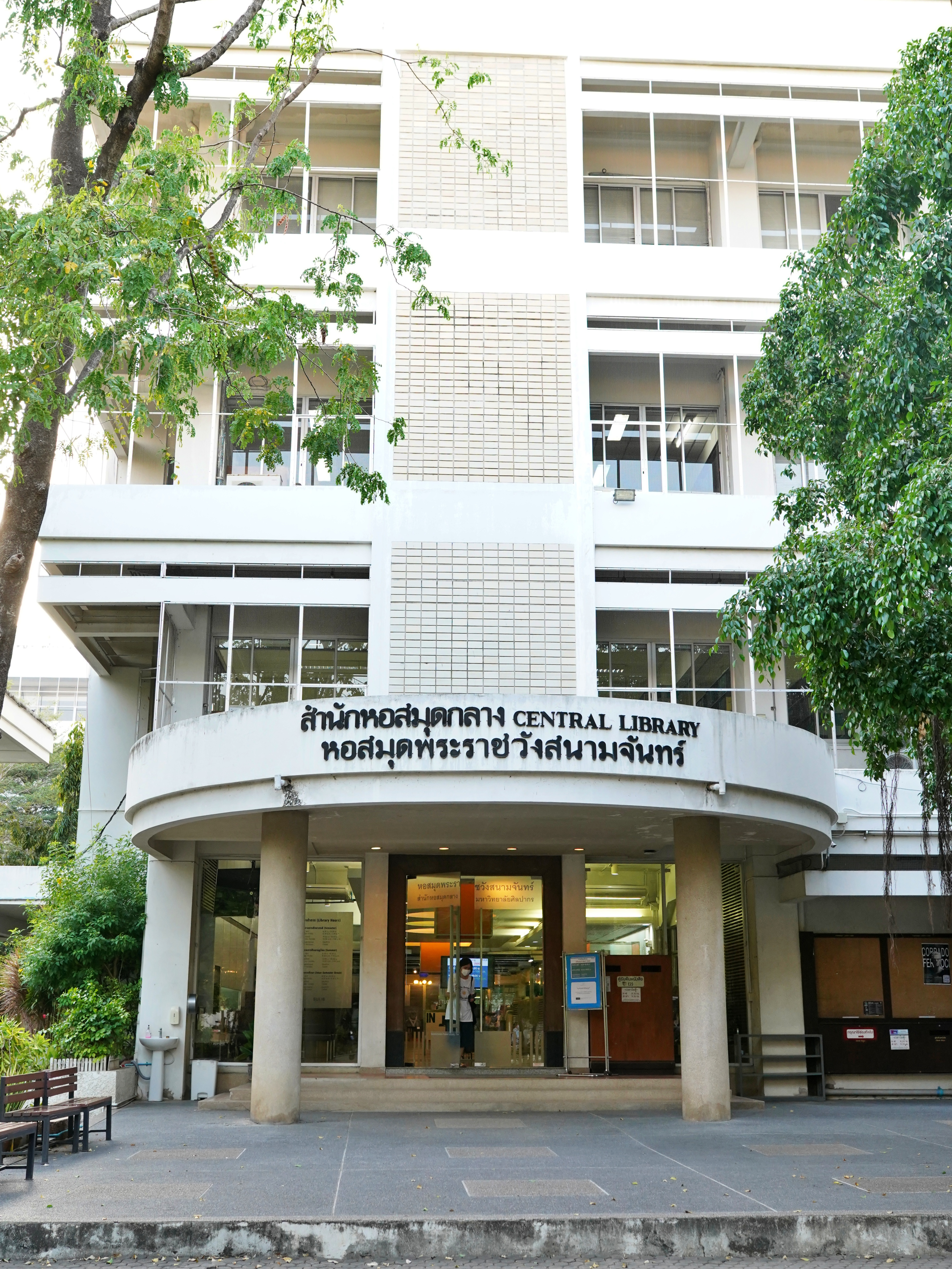
Silpakorn university central library

== See also ==
- Silpakorn University Art Gallery
- Education in Thailand
- List of universities and colleges in Thailand
- Lists of universities and colleges
