= Slovak Chamber of Architects =

The Slovak Chamber of Architects (Slovak: Slovenská komora architektov, pronounced [ˈslɔʋenskaː ˈkɔmɔra ˈarxitektɔw]) is a self-governing, state-owned legal entity of non-business nature based in Bratislava. It was established on 1 June 1992 by the Act of the Slovak National Council no. 138/1992 Coll (č. 138/1992 Zb.), about authorized architects and authorized building engineers. It is financed from own revenues without state subsidies. It is a member of the Architectural Council of Europe (ACE) and part of the network of competent authorities in architecture – the European Network of Architects Competent Authorities (ENACA). The organization brings together the architects and landscape architects in Slovakia.

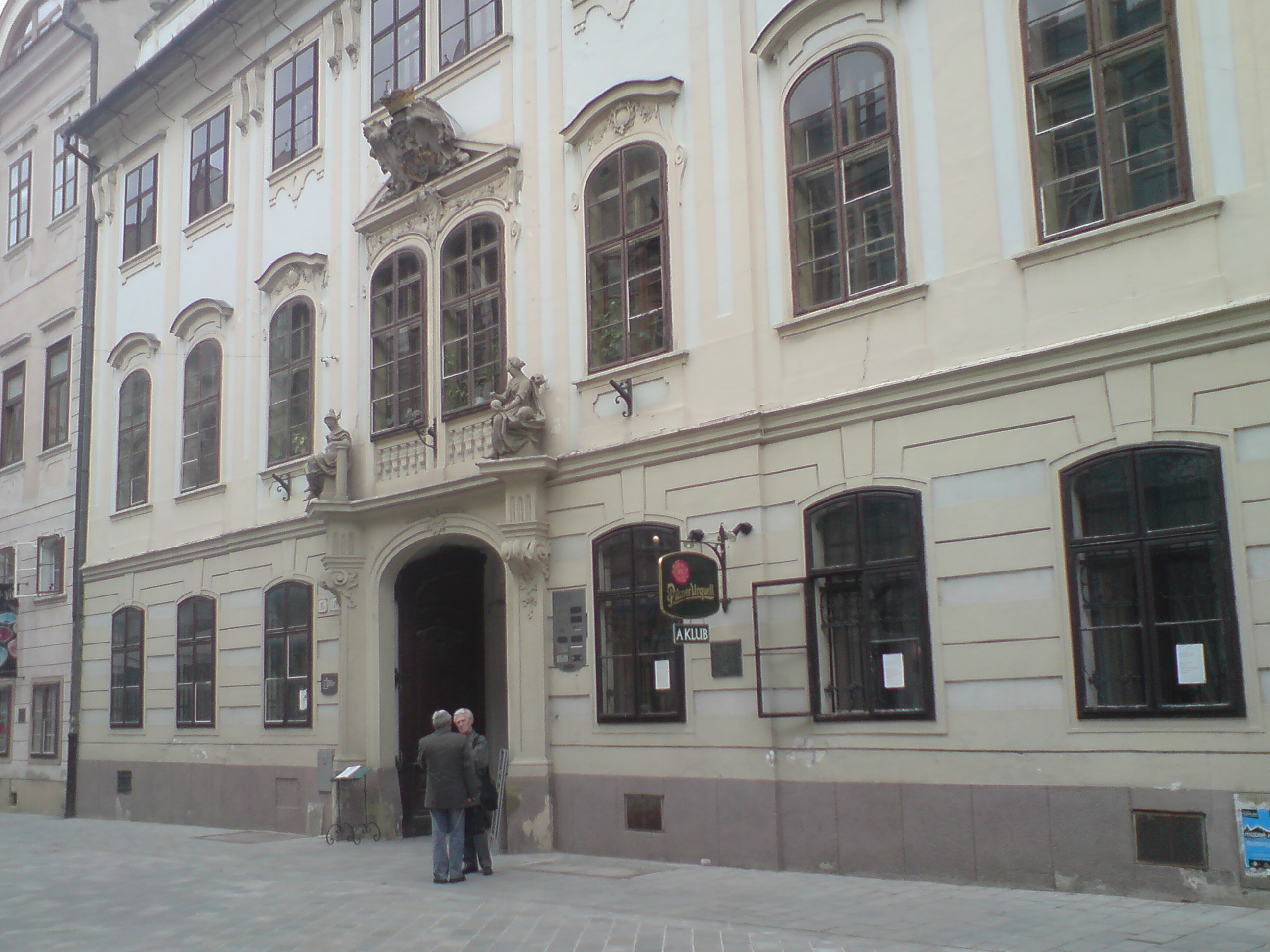
Seat in Bratislava

== Publication ==
Authorized landscape architects are a minority group in the chamber. In 2015 the publication Záhradná krajinná architektúra na Slovensku, 33 záhradných a krajinných architektov Slovenska (Landscape Architecture in Slovakia, with the subtitle 33 garden and landscape architects of Slovakia), ISBN 978-80-89228-42-3. was published. It represents 33 encyclopaedically processed profiles of the most important contemporary Slovak garden architects and their creations. The aim of the publication is to highlight quality examples of implemented gardens and park modifications in Slovakia.
