= Romano Viviani =

Italian architect (1927–2006)

- Born: 15 December 1927; Bangkok, Kingdom of Siam
- Died: 21 November 2006 (aged 78); Florence, Italy
- Education: University of Florence
- Occupations: Architect, urban planner, academic
- Parents: Silpa Bhirasri (father); Fanny Viviani (mother)

Romano Viviani (15 December 1927 – 21 November 2006) was an Italian architect, urban planner and academic.

== Life and career ==
The son of the sculptor Corrado Feroci (Silpa Bhirasri), he adopted his mother's surname, Viviani. After completing classical studies in Rome in 1945, he studied architecture first in Rome and then at the University of Florence, where he graduated in 1952. He began his academic career as an assistant to Raffaello Fagnoni at the Faculty of Architecture of Florence, later becoming professor and director of the Institute of Architectural Research (1978–1980) and holding the chair of urban planning until 1996.

His professional activity focused on the social and urban aspects of architecture, with numerous projects for educational, healthcare, and social housing buildings throughout Tuscany. Viviani contributed to the drafting of urban and structural plans for several municipalities, including Empoli, Certaldo, Castelfiorentino, Montelupo Fiorentino, and Poggibonsi, and coordinated planning instruments for the Val di Cornia and Val di Cecina areas.

Viviani held several prominent institutional roles at both national and international levels. He served as delegate for international relations at the Faculty of Architecture of Florence (from 1994), was a member for over twenty years of the Technical-Administrative Commission of the Tuscany Region, and sat on the Board of Directors of the Milan Triennial (1991–1996). He was also president of the Order of Architects of Tuscany (1981–1983), vice president of the National Council of Architects (1983–1986), and founder and first president of the Architects' Council of Europe (1990–1991).

== Books (selection) ==
- Viviani, Romano (1964). L'insegnamento di caratteri distributivi degli edifici a Firenze: metodi, ricerche, contributi. Florence: Libreria Editrice Fiorentina.
- Viviani, Romano (1998). Governare la città o governare i cittadini? Le regole dell'ordine. Florence: Alinea.
- Viviani, Romano (2001). Piano pubblico progetti privati. I limiti alla tolleranza. Florence: Alinea.

== Sources ==
- Andrea Aleardi; Corrado Marcetti, eds. (2011). L'architettura in Toscana dal 1945 ad oggi. Una guida alla selezione delle opere di rilevante interesse storico-artistico. Florence: Alinea.
- Elisabetta Insabato; Cecilia Ghelli, eds. (2007). Guida agli archivi di architetti e ingegneri del Novecento in Toscana. Florence: Edifir.
- Leonardo Rignanese, ed. (2013). Romano Viviani (PDF). Florence: Aida.
