= Silpa Bhirasri National Museum =

Modern art museum in Bangkok, Thailand

Coordinates: 13°45′10″N 100°29′27″E

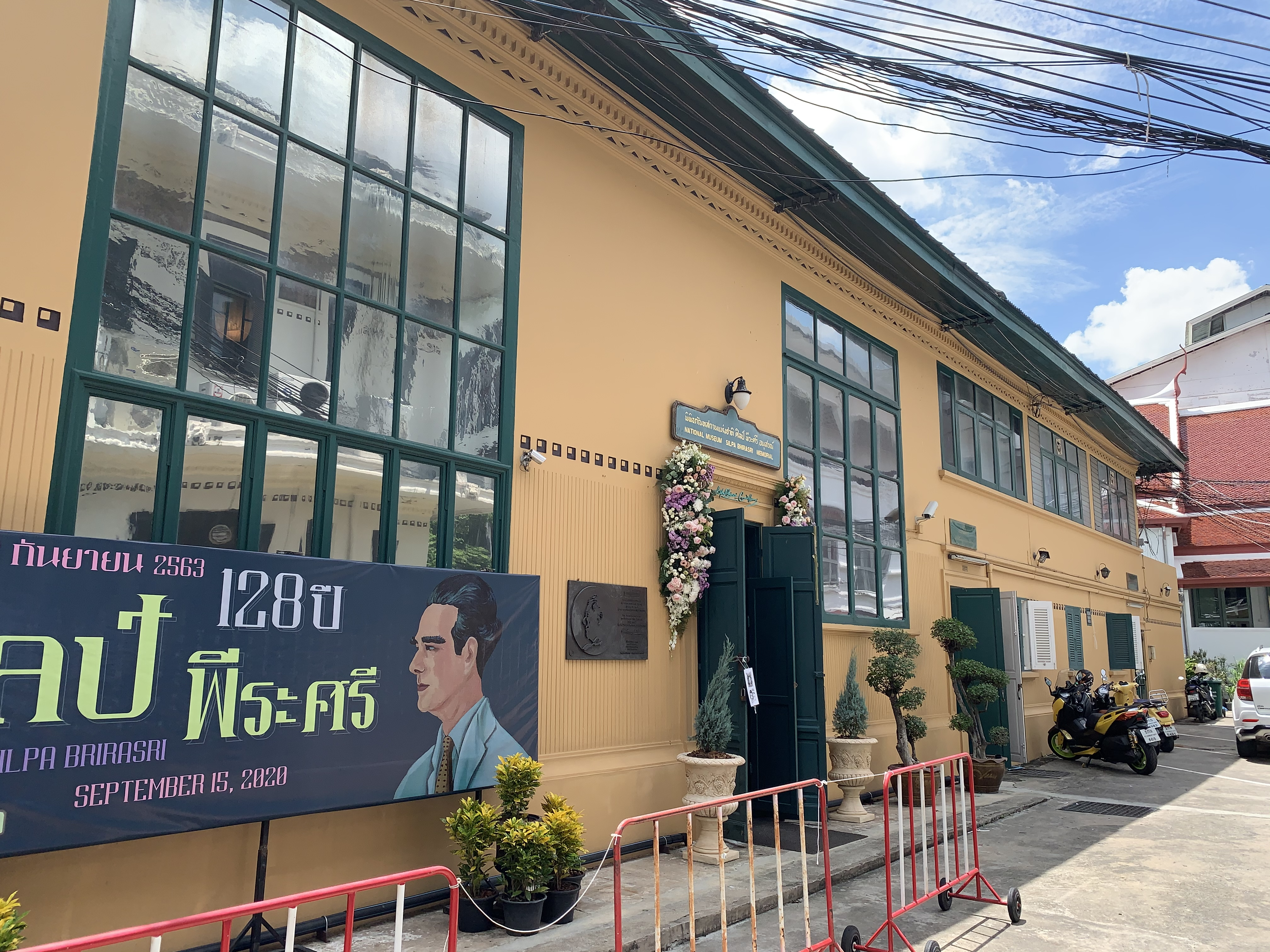
Silpa Bhirasri National Museum

Silpa Bhirasri National Museum (Thai: พิพิธภัณฑสถานแห่งชาติ ศิลป์ พีระศรี) is a modern art museum in Bangkok, Thailand. It is on the grounds of the Fine Arts Department in Phra Nakhon District. The museum consists of two parts, one displaying contemporary arts, and the other belongings of Silpa Bhirasri, the father of modern Thai art.
