= Samsenwittayalai School =

- โรงเรียนสามเสนวิทยาลัย
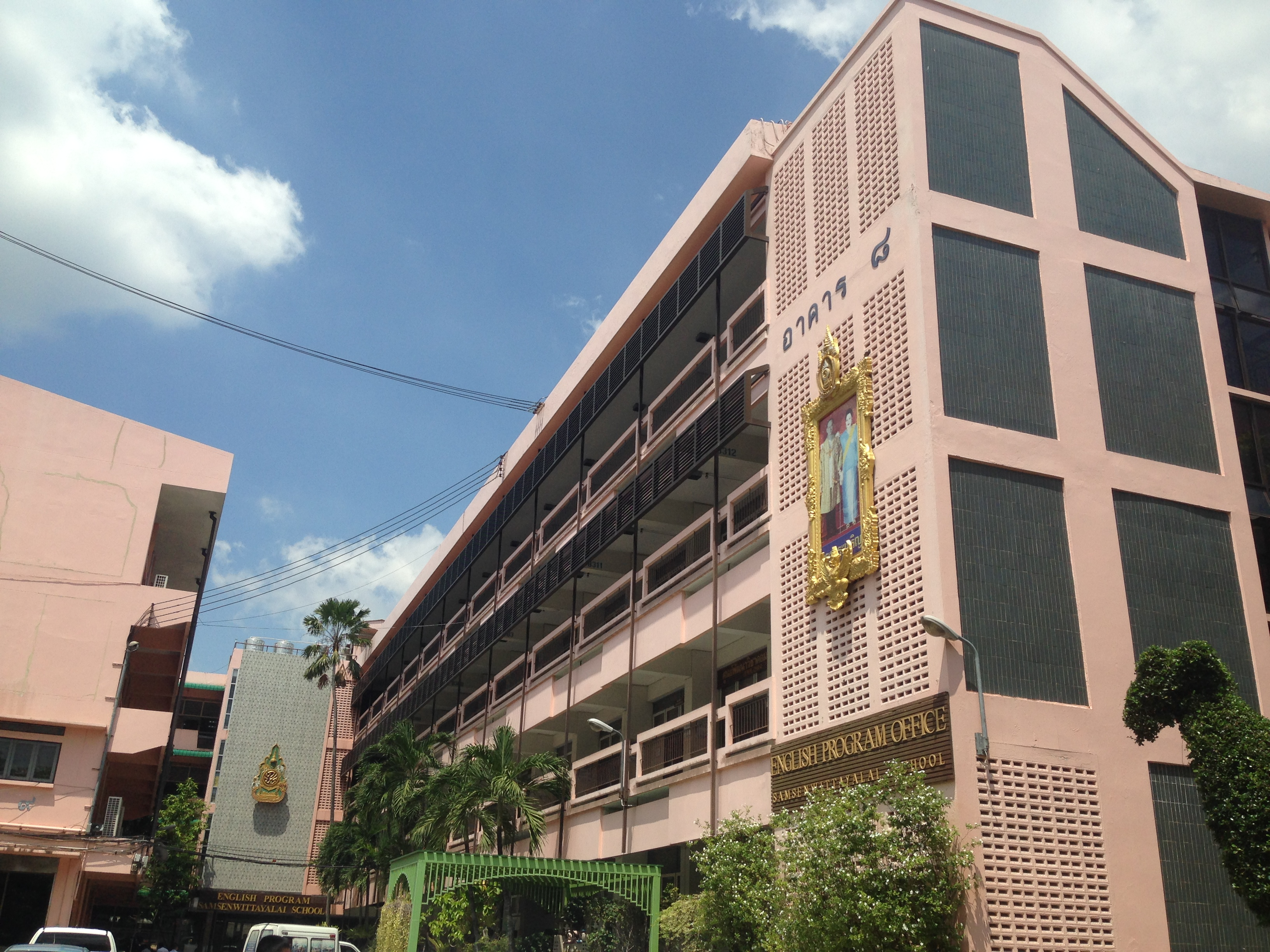
- Building 8, Samsenwittayalai School
- 132/11 Rama VI Rd; Phaya Thai, Phaya Thai, Bangkok, 10400

Information
- Motto: สทฺธา สาธุ ปติฏฺฐิตา (We will succeed if we believe.)
- Established: 15 April 1955
- Color: Pink - Green
- Song: มาร์ชสามเสนวิทยาลัย
- Website: www.samsenwit.ac.th

Samsenwittayalai School (Thai: โรงเรียนสามเสนวิทยาลัย) (abbreviation: "SS" (Thai abbreviation: ส.ส.)) is a high school located at Bangkok's Phaya Thai District. The number of students in this school approximately 3,600 students from Matthayom 1 to Matthayom 6.

Samsenwittayalai school is one of 283 very selective schools in Thailand. It admits about 240 Matthayom 1 students yearly, but has more than three applicants for each place. The is led to some dubious practices. In 2017, the school director was removed from his position when he was accused of demanding a 4,000,000 Dollars payment for admitting a student. He was subsequently found guilty and fired from his position. He was found to be involved in other bribery cases worth a total of about eight million dollars. "His guilt was obvious as he took the money but failed to put it in the school's coffers", said an official of the Office of Basic Education Commission (OBEC).

== School symbol ==
The symbol consists of a beacon above an abbreviation of the school inside a circle. The mark also consists of a philosophy with the meaning of that philosophy written around the circle. The name of the school is on a green ribbon under the circle.

== School flag ==
The symbol of the school is placed at the corner of a flag which is half pink and half green, the school colors.

== History ==
In 1951, the Ministry of Education (Thailand) built a school in Bangkok (previously called: พระนคร) named Rang Nam school (โรงเรียนรางน้ำ). On 20 December 1951, the Ministry of Education renamed it Sriayudhya school (โรงเรียนศรีอยุธยา). Then on 1 July 1953, the Department of General Education moved the male students who have no school in, but the place was too crowded. The ministry of Education then established a new school and the construction started on 16 April 1954 and the male students moved here on 15 April 1955. The official name was given: Samsenwittayalai school (โรงเรียนสามเสนวิทยาลัย).

The students, parents and teachers than had a decision to hold an event to honour the school on 15 April, but it was found to be inconvenient because of the summer break. In 1983, the first ever "Samsenwittayalai Day" event was hold on 28 January, which is the establishment day of Samsenwittayalai Alumni Association, and it is repeated every year since then. The activity is offering alms to 99 monks by all the students and teachers and giving awards to the teachers who have made a remarkable progress.

In 1962, Mattayom 7 was started and the school is excellent in sports, especially football. The words have spread and there are fans of the school's football team since then.

In 1967, the school changed from all-boy to co-education.

In 1995, the school has a new branch named Ratchananthachan Samsenwittayalai 2 School.

In 2004, the school established "Math-Science Enrichment Program (MSEP)" and "English Program (EP) in the following year.

In 2011, the school established "English Integrated Studies" and "Enrichment Science Classroom (ESC)" in the next 2 years.

== Buildings ==
- The first building (Building 1) was constructed in 1954. This building consists of an agriculture classroom, greeting room, meeting room, old Samsenwittayalai student association room, infirmatory, office of finance and asset management and office of student affairs.
- The Science and Mathematics Building (Building 2) was all wooden, but it was rebuilt in 1969 into a 4-story concrete building. This building consists of science and math classrooms, science and math teachers' office, academics office and student record office. The flag pole is also located here, which the length was lengthen in June 2017.
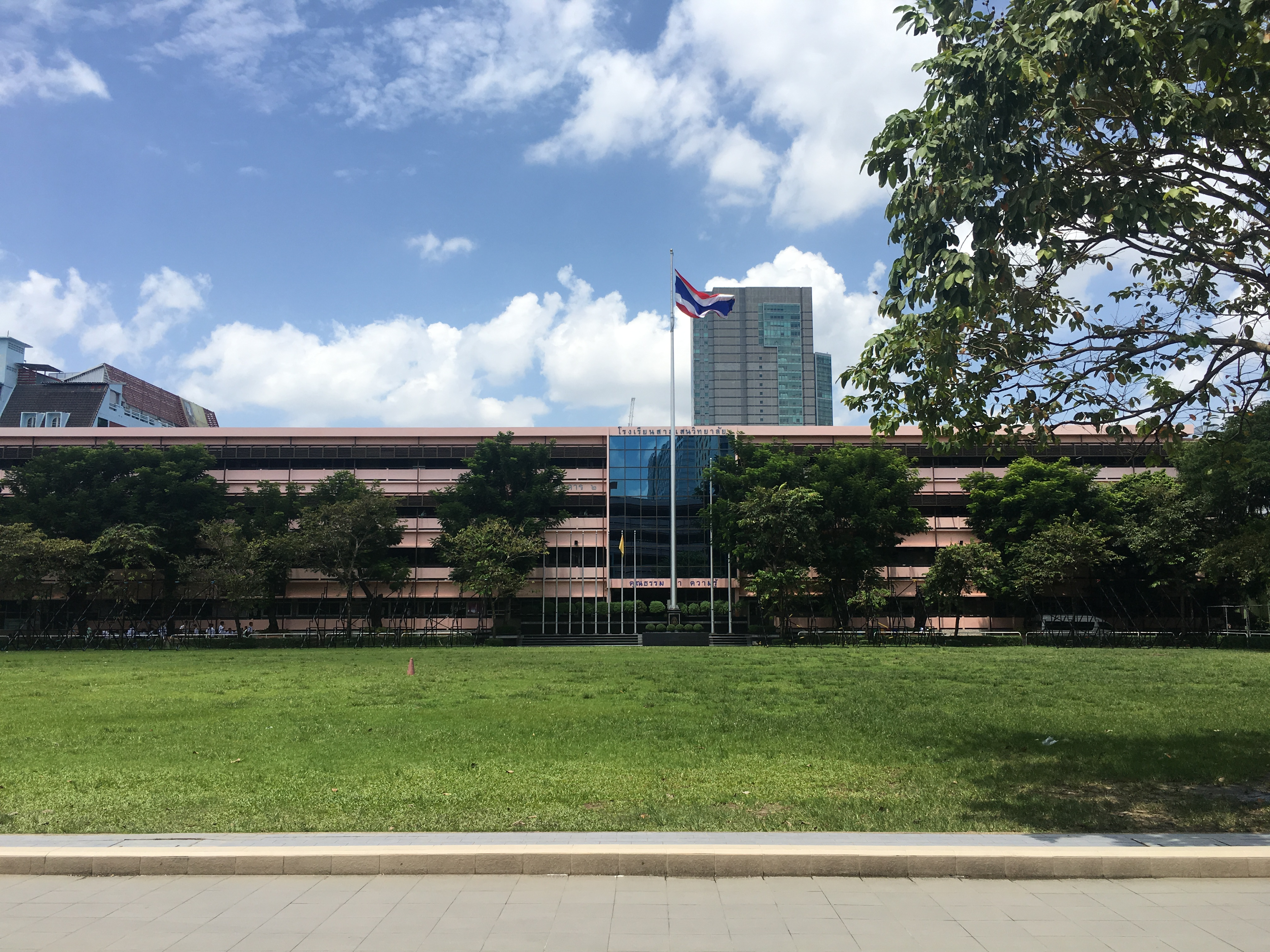
  Building 2 exterior (taken September 2018)
- The third building (Building 3) was first built in 1954 and rebuilt in 1974 into a 5-story building. This building consists of an audiovisual room, ICT room, language classrooms, social studies classroom, teachers' office and learners' development activities office. Minimart, parents and teachers association's office and student council office. The extension of this building (meeting rooms, administration office and more classrooms) was done in 2001 and a school bank was established (sponsored by Government Savings Bank (GSB)) in 2011.
- The Art Building (Building 4) was first built in 1963 and rebuilt in 1989 into a 5-story building. It has a library on the first floor and consists of an art and music classrooms. In 2017, 2 classrooms (room 4201 and 4202) was renovated and changed to be arts exhibition hall. The library is also renovated in the same year.
- The Home Economics Department (Building 5) is a 2-story building. It has a cooking class and a lounge on the first floor and The home economics class on the second.
- The Gym (Building 6) is used for physical education class. The building itself is a badminton court and a P.E. teachers' office. Next to the building there is a tennis court, which was built in 2002. It functions as tennis court, basketball court, volleyball court, indoor futsal field and other ball games. Now this building is demolished and will be rebuilt with building 7 to be a 6-story multipurpose building.
- Industrial Arts (Building 7) was built in 1964 for home economics classes. The first floor is industrial work study. The second floor has both the architecture class, handcrafting class and business classroom. Now this building is demolished and will be rebuilt with building 6 to be a 6-story multipurpose building.
- The English Program Building (Building 8) was built in 1964 as an asset of Ministry of Education and handed over to Samsenwittayalai School in 2002. The exterior was renovated and now it is the building of all English Program Students. It has its own computer lab, science labs, dance classroom, music classroom, English Program Office and management office.
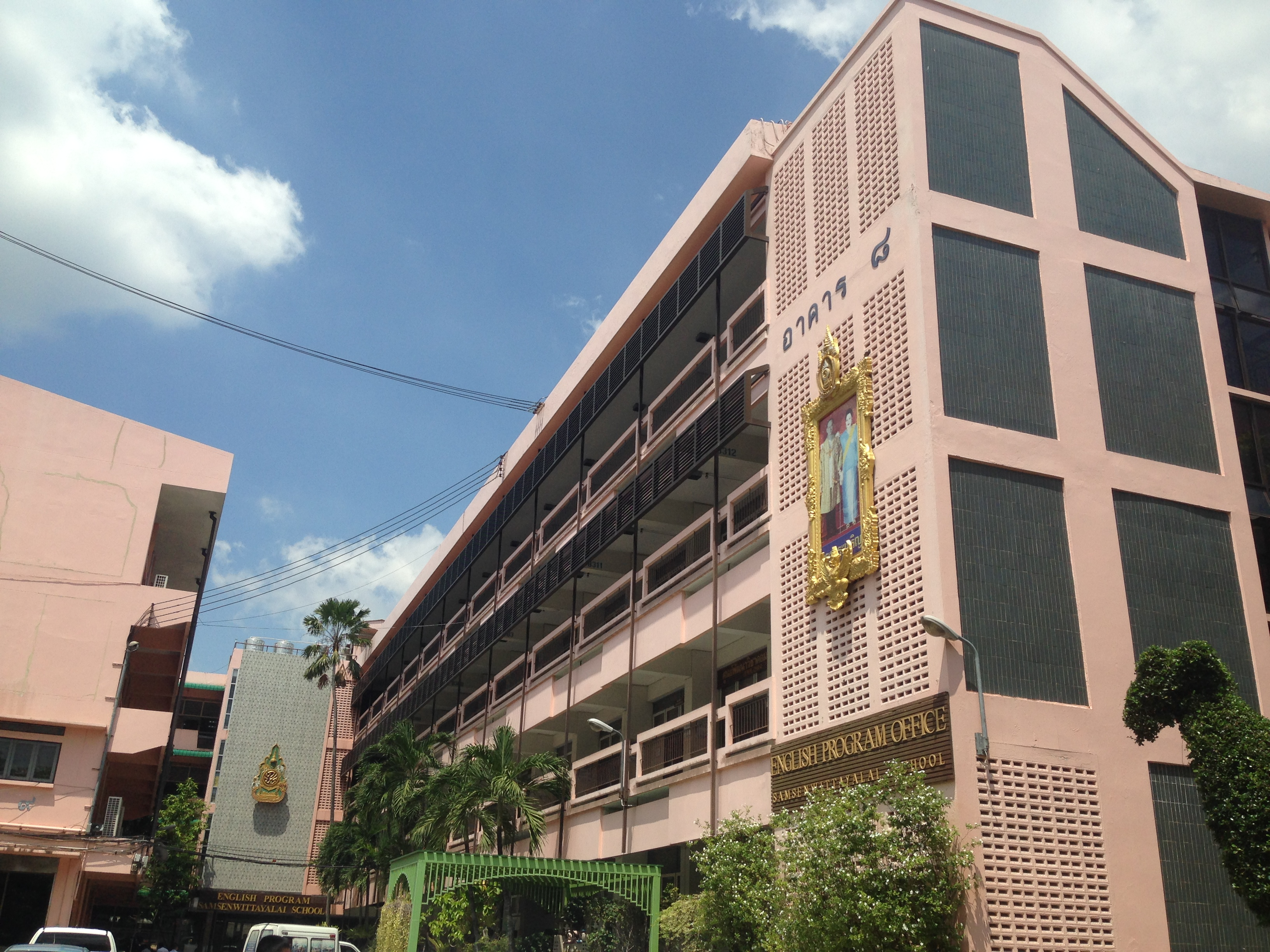
  Building 8 (taken May 2015)
- Building 9 is an extension of building 4 for art-language students and the library. The first and second floor is an extension of the library, and the third and fourth is the language classrooms for higher secondary students.
- Multipurpose building was built in 1977. The cafeteria is located here on the first level and the grand multipurpose room on the second.
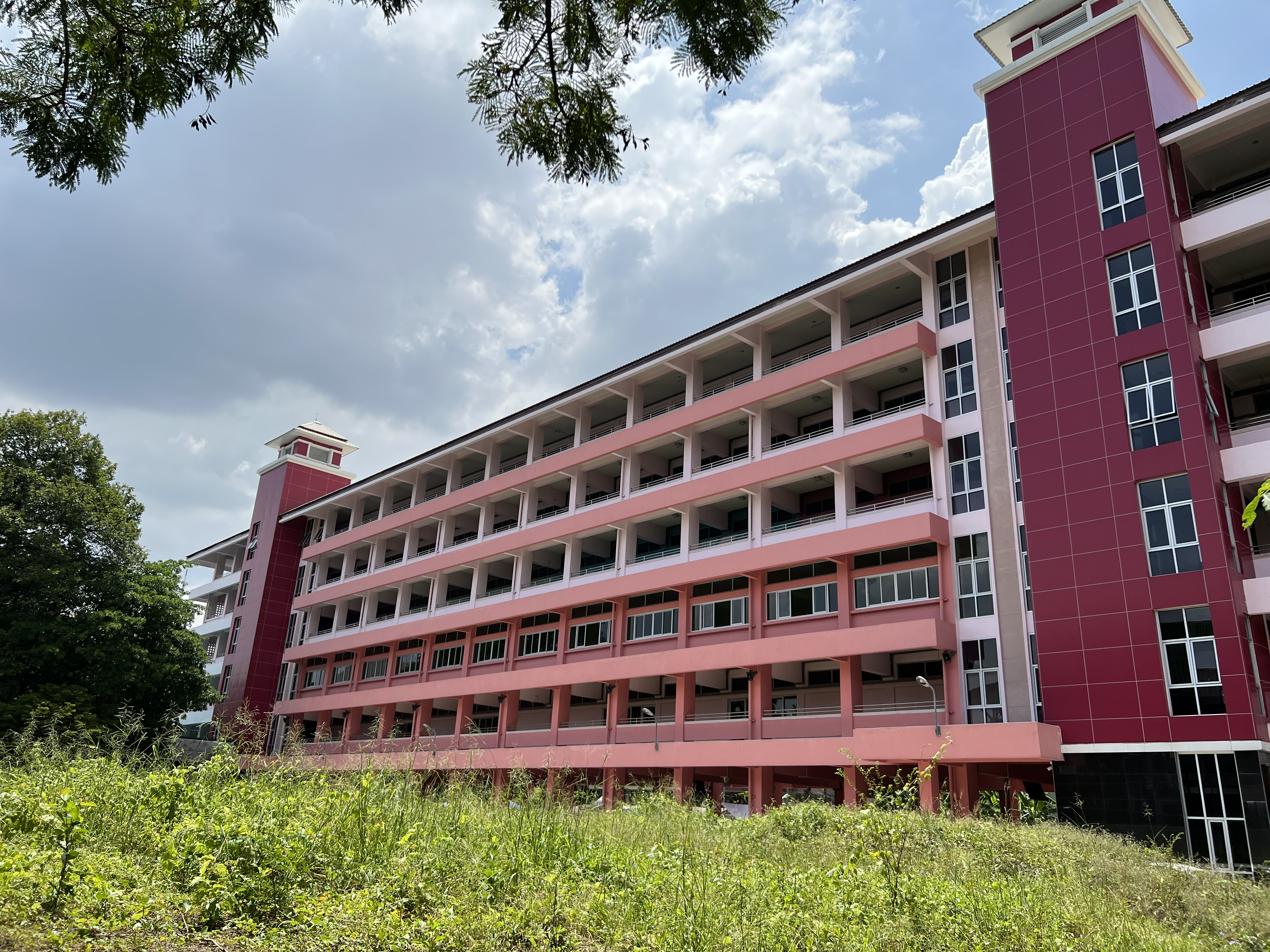
- The New Building (taken May 2022)
  The new building (or the 6-story multipurpose building) is currently finished. This building is connected to building 2 (the science and mathematics building).

== Curriculum ==
Lower Secondary (M.1-M.3)

- Enrichment Science Classroom (ESC)
- Math-Science Enrichment Program (MSEP)
- Standard Curriculum Program
- English Integrated Studies (EIS)
- English Program (EP)

Higher Secondary (M.4-M.6)

- Science-Math Program - 4 classrooms
- Enrichment Science-Math-Technology-Environment (ESMTE)
- Intensive Math Program (IMP)
- Math-Science Enrichment Program (MSEP)
- English Integrated Studies (EIS)
- Arts-Math Program
- Arts-Language
- Arts-Math and Arts-Language English Program (EP)
- Science-Math English Program (EP)
- IPST Program
