= Silpa Bhirasri =

Italian sculptor

Professor Silpa Bhirasri
- ศิลป พีระศรี
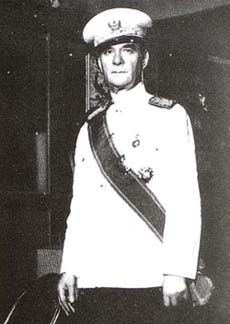
- Born: Corrado Feroci; 15 September 1892; Florence, Tuscany, Kingdom of Italy
- Died: 14 May 1962 (aged 69); Bangkok, Thailand

Silpa Bhirasri or Birasri (Thai: ศาสตราจารย์ ศิลป พีระศรี; RTGS: Sin Phirasi; Thai pronunciation: [sǐn pʰīː.rá.sǐː]), born Corrado Feroci (15 September 1892 – 14 May 1962), was an Italian-born Thai sculptor. He is considered the father of modern art in Thailand and was instrumental in the founding of today's Silpakorn University.

== Life ==
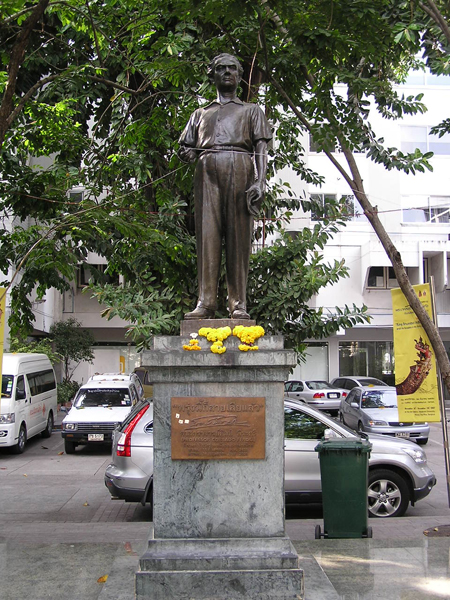
The statue of Silpa Bhirasri at Silpakorn University

Born in Florence, Tuscany, he studied at the Royal Art Academy of Florence and taught there from 1914 to 1923. Feroci was invited to Thailand in 1923 to teach Western sculpture at the Fine Arts Department of the Ministry of Palace Affairs. He was appointed as a sculptor in 1924 on a three-year contract for 800 baht per month.

In 1943, he founded what later became Silpakorn University, the University of Fine Arts.

When Italy surrendered to the Allies during World War II, Feroci changed his name and became a Thai national in 1944 to avoid arrest by the occupying Japanese army. Previously estranged from his wife in Italy, in his later years he married one of his Thai students.

Feroci / Silpa was the designer and sculptor of many of Bangkok's best known monuments, including Democracy Monument, Victory Monument, and the statue of King Rama I at Memorial Bridge.

He wrote numerous textbooks on art, including Theory of Colour (1943), Theory of Composition (1944), and An Aid to Arts and English-Siamese Glossary (1942–1944).

== Personal life ==
In 1918, Bhirasri (then still Feroci) married Paola Angelini. However, in 1921, he began living with Fanny Viviani, with whom he later had two children – Isabella and Romano. In 1949, after his fourth trip to Italy, he separated from Viviani, who stayed in Florence, and started living with Malini Kenny, who was 37 years younger than him. In 1959, he married Malini Hitasak in a civil ceremony and lived with her until his death.

== Death ==
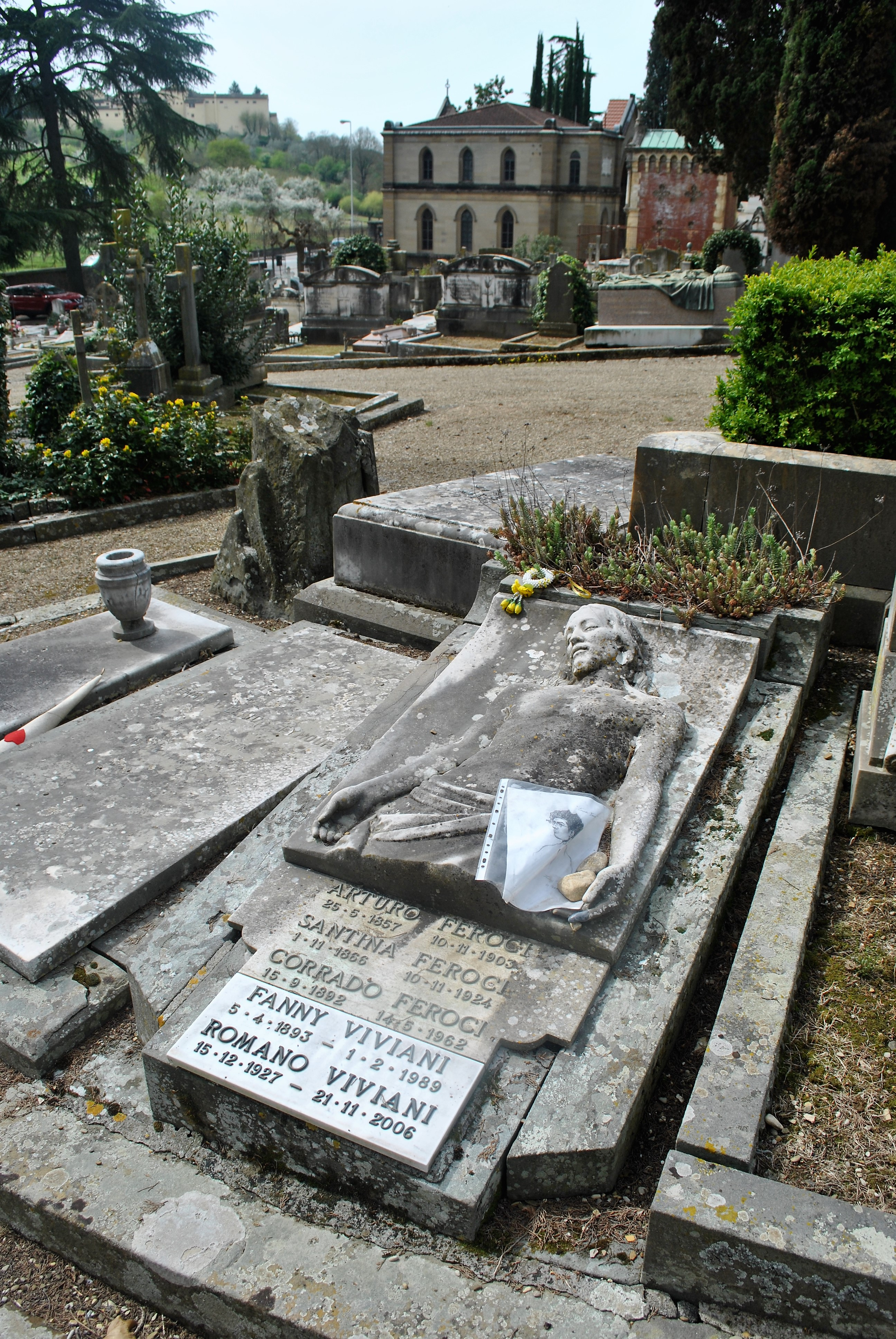
Cimitero degli Allori

Silpa Bhirasri died in Bangkok on 14 May 1962 from a heart attack following surgery at Siriraj Hospital. He is buried in the Cimitero Evangelico degli Allori in the southern suburb of Florence, Galluzzo (Italy).

== Tribute ==
Bhirasri's birthday, 15 September, is observed each year in Thailand as Silpa Bhirasri Day. In the courtyard of Silpakorn University, students kneel and leave offerings at his statue, including flower wreaths and plates of spaghetti, in tribute to Silpa Bhirasri's Italian heritage.

The Bhirasri Institute of Modern Art (BIMA) was established in 1974 following years of advocacy by art patrons and artists committed to fulfilling Bhirasri's vision after his passing.

In 1992, Thailand Post issued a commemorative stamp to mark the 100th anniversary of Silpa Bhirasri.

In 2016, he was featured as a Google Doodle on what would have been his 124th birthday.

The historic mansion where the sculptor lived has been open to visitors since 2017, offering guided tours, and is where some of Thailand's most famous sculptures and monuments were created.

A modern art museum in Bangkok is named after Silpa Bhirasri.

== Partial list of works ==
- Democracy Monument at Phra Nakhon district, Bangkok 1939.
- Victory Monument at Ratchathewi district, Bangkok 1942.
- Prathom Rajanusorn King Rama I statue at Phra Phutta Yodfa Bridge, Bangkok 1929.
- Monument Thao Suranari in Nakhon Ratchasima 1934.
- Royal Memorial King Rama VI at Lumphini Park, Bangkok 1942.
- Don Chedi Monument, Don Chedi, Suphanburi Province 1959. Sitthidet Saenghiran, Pakorn Lekson and Sanan Silakorn assisted in creation of the 1 1/2 life size statue.
- The Royal Monument of King Taksin Wongwian Yai, Bangkok 1950.
- Phutthamonthon, Nakhon Pathom (west of Bangkok), 1976, considered to be the tallest free-standing Buddha statue in the world.
